= Brzustewicz =

Brzustewicz is a surname. Notable people with the surname include:

- Henry Brzustewicz (born 2007), American ice hockey player
- Hunter Brzustewicz (born 2004), American ice hockey player
