= Liam Greentree =

Canadian ice hockey player (born 2006)

- Born: January 1, 2006 (age 20) Oshawa, Ontario, Canada
- Height: 6 ft 2 in (188 cm)
- Weight: 207 lb (94 kg; 14 st 11 lb)
- Position: Right wing
- Shoots: Left
- NHL team (P) Cur. team: New York Rangers; Hartford Wolf Pack (AHL)
- NHL draft: 26th overall, 2024; Los Angeles Kings
- Playing career: 2026–present

Liam Greentree (born January 1, 2006) is a Canadian professional ice hockey right winger who plays for the Hartford Wolf Pack of the American Hockey League (AHL) as a prospect of the New York Rangers of the National Hockey League (NHL). He was drafted 26th overall by the Los Angeles Kings in the 2024 NHL entry draft.

== Playing career ==
Greentree recorded 25 goals and 20 assists in 61 games for the Windsor Spitfires during the 2022–23 season. His 25 goals were the most amongst rookies, and that earned him an OHL First All-Rookie Team selection. During the 2023–24 season, he served as team captain and led his team in scoring with 36 goals and 54 assists in 64 games for the Spitfires. Following the season he was named to the OHL Third All-Star team.

Greentree was drafted 26th overall by the Los Angeles Kings in the 2024 NHL entry draft. On July 20, 2024, the Kings signed Greentree to a three-year, entry-level contract. In the 2024–25 season, he had 49 goals and 70 assists in 64 games, helping the Spitfires to win the West Division title in the regular season. In recognition of his play, Greentree received the Mickey Renaud Captain's Trophy for "leadership on and off the ice," and was named to the OHL First All-Star Team. The Canadian Hockey League later named him to its Third All-Star Team for the year.

On February 4, 2026, Greentree was traded to the New York Rangers, as part of the deal for Artemi Panarin. At the end of the 2025-26 season, Greentree was named one of the four finalists for the Mickey Renaud Captain's Trophy, along with fellow Rangers' prospect Nathan Aspinall.

He began the 2026-27 season with the Rangers' American Hockey League affiliate, the Hartford Wolf Pack. He scored his first professional goal for the Wolf Pack in a game against the Wilkes-Barre/Scranton Penguins on 10 October 2026.

== International play ==
Medal record

Men's ice hockey

Representing Canada

World Junior Championships
Bronze medal – third place	2026 United States	

World U18 Championships
Gold medal – first place	2024 Finland	

On April 16, 2024, Greentree was selected to represent Canada's under-18 team at the 2024 World U18 Championships. He contributed two goals and two assists over seven games, helping the team secure the gold medal.

In December 2025, he was selected to represent Canada at the 2026 World Junior Championships. During the tournament he recorded one assist in three games and won a bronze medal.

== Career statistics ==
=== Regular season and playoffs ===
			Regular season					Playoffs
Season	Team	League	GP	G	A	Pts	PIM	GP	G	A	Pts	PIM
2022–23	Windsor Spitfires	OHL	61	25	20	45	26	4	0	1	1	0
2023–24	Windsor Spitfires	OHL	64	36	54	90	33	—	—	—	—	—
2024–25	Windsor Spitfires	OHL	64	49	70	119	59	11	14	10	24	6
2025–26	Windsor Spitfires	OHL	52	38	36	74	63	13	6	8	14	9
OHL totals			241	148	180	328	181	28	20	19	39	15

=== International ===
Year	Team	Event	Result	GP	G	A	Pts	PIM
2023	Canada	HG18	1st place, gold medalist(s)	3	0	1	1	0
2024	Canada	U18	1st place, gold medalist(s)	7	2	2	4	0
2026	Canada	WJC	3rd place, bronze medalist(s)	3	0	1	1	0
Junior totals				13	2	4	6	0

== Awards and honours ==
Award	Year	Ref
CHL
Third All-Star Team	2025	
OHL
First All-Rookie Team	2023	
Third All-Star Team	2024	
Mickey Renaud Captain's Trophy	2025	
First All-Star Team	2025	

Awards and achievements
Preceded by Brandt Clarke	Los Angeles Kings first-round draft pick 2024	Succeeded by Henry Brzustewicz
