= Igor Chernyshov (ice hockey) =

Russian ice hockey player (born 2005)

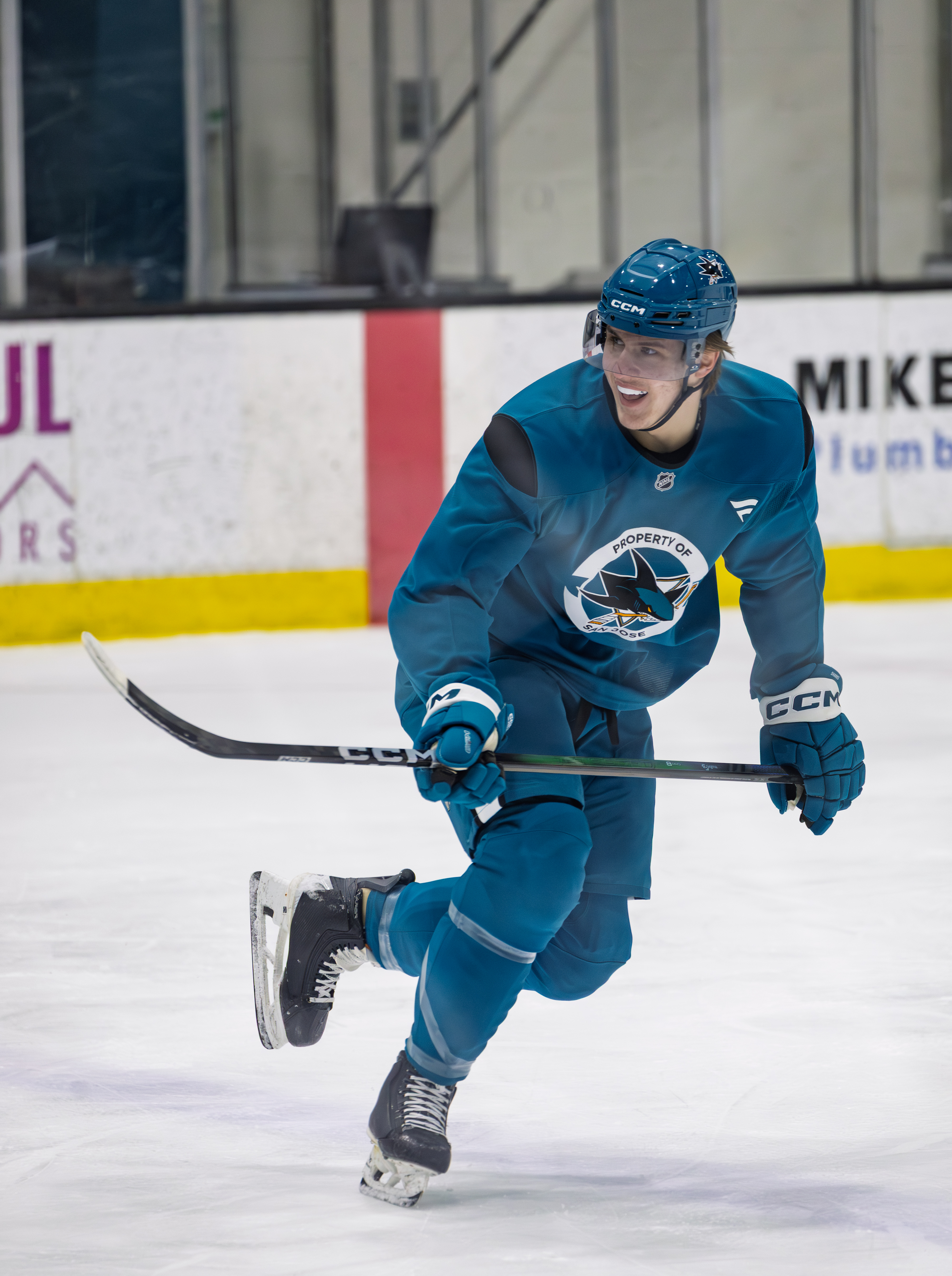
- Chernyshov in 2026
- Born: 30 November 2005 (age 20) Penza, Russia
- Height: 6 ft 3 in (191 cm)
- Weight: 195 lb (88 kg; 13 st 13 lb)
- Position: Left wing
- Shoots: Right
- NHL team Former teams: San Jose Sharks; Dynamo Moscow
- NHL draft: 33rd overall, 2024; San Jose Sharks
- Playing career: 2022–present

Igor Igorevich Chernyshov (born 30 November 2005) is a Russian ice hockey player who is a left-winger for the San Jose Sharks of the National Hockey League (NHL). He was selected 33rd overall by the Sharks in the 2024 NHL entry draft.

== Playing career ==
As a youth, Chernyshov developed within Dynamo Moscow of the Kontinental Hockey League (KHL).

In the 2022–23 season, Chernyshov led MHC Dynamo Moscow in scoring with 38 points in 38 games. He is one of a small number of Junior Hockey League (MHL) players to record a point-per-game pace in the year before their draft-eligible season. The following year, he split time between the MHL and the Kontinental Hockey League (KHL), recording 13 goals and 28 points in 23 MHL games and four points in 34 KHL games.

In the 2024 NHL entry draft, he was selected with the first pick of the second round, 33rd overall by the San Jose Sharks. After his release from the final season of his contract with Dynamo Moscow, Chernyshov was signed by the Sharks to a three-year, entry-level contract on 1 August 2024. He was then drafted 56th overall in the 2024 CHL import draft by the Saginaw Spirit of the Ontario Hockey League (OHL), with whom he signed a development agreement on 5 August. On 20 August, Chernyshov's agent announced he had undergone a surgical procedure to repair his shoulder.

Chernyshov started the 2025–26 season in the AHL with the San Jose Barracuda. He was recalled from the AHL on 14 December 2025 after injuries to both Will Smith and Philipp Kurashev. He was sent back down to the Barracuda after 15 games, but was recalled again on 12 March 2026.

== Career statistics ==
			Regular season					Playoffs
Season	Team	League	GP	G	A	Pts	PIM	GP	G	A	Pts	PIM
2021–22	MHC Dynamo Moscow	MHL	18	7	4	11	6	6	5	0	5	2
2022–23	Dynamo Moscow	KHL	5	1	0	1	0	—	—	—	—	—
2022–23	MHC Dynamo Moscow	MHL	38	18	20	38	20	—	—	—	—	—
2023–24	Dynamo Moscow	KHL	34	3	1	4	2	10	0	0	0	0
2023–24	MHC Dynamo Moscow	MHL	22	13	15	28	18	—	—	—	—	—
2024–25	Saginaw Spirit	OHL	23	19	36	55	6	5	2	4	6	6
2024–25	San Jose Barracuda	AHL	2	0	1	1	0	1	1	0	1	0
2025–26	San Jose Barracuda	AHL	41	13	20	33	36	2	1	0	1	0
2025–26	San Jose Sharks	NHL	28	9	10	19	6	—	—	—	—	—
KHL totals			39	4	1	5	2	10	0	0	0	0
NHL totals			28	9	10	19	6	—	—	—	—	—
