= Carson Rehkopf =

Canadian ice hockey player (born 2005)

- Born: January 7, 2005 (age 21) Barrie, Ontario, Canada
- Height: 6 ft 2 in (188 cm)
- Weight: 206 lb (93 kg; 14 st 10 lb)
- Position: Forward
- Shoots: Left
- NHL team (P) Cur. team: Seattle Kraken; Coachella Valley Firebirds (AHL)
- NHL draft: 50th overall, 2023; Seattle Kraken
- Playing career: 2025–present

Carson Rehkopf (born January 7, 2005) is a Canadian professional ice hockey forward for the Coachella Valley Firebirds of the American Hockey League (AHL) and is under contract to the Seattle Kraken of the National Hockey League (NHL). Rehkopf was selected by the Kraken in the second round, 50th overall, of the 2023 NHL entry draft.

== Playing career ==
Rehkopf played minor hockey with the Toronto Jr. Canadiens of the Greater Toronto Hockey League (GTHL). He was selected in the first round, 17th overall, in the 2021 OHL Priority Selection by the Kitchener Rangers.

As a 16-year-old rookie during the 2021–22 season, Rehkopf scored 22 goals for the Rangers in 77 games. He jumped to hitting the 30-goal mark and tallying 59 points in the 2022–23 regular season, which was an important milestone given it was his NHL draft year. Rehkopf was then drafted 50th overall by the Seattle Kraken in the 2023 NHL entry draft.

On April 21, 2024, Rehkopf was signed to an entry-level contract by the Kraken.

== International play ==
Rehkopf represented Team Canada at the 2024 World Junior Ice Hockey Championships where he recorded two goals and two assists in five games.

== Career statistics ==
=== Regular season and playoffs ===
			Regular season					Playoffs
Season	Team	League	GP	G	A	Pts	PIM	GP	G	A	Pts	PIM
2021–22	Kitchener Rangers	OHL	65	18	15	33	42	12	4	2	6	4
2022–23	Kitchener Rangers	OHL	68	30	29	59	40	9	2	4	6	8
2023–24	Kitchener Rangers	OHL	60	52	43	95	45	10	6	5	11	2
2024–25	Brampton Steelheads	OHL	57	42	44	86	22	6	7	1	8	10
2024–25	Coachella Valley Firebirds	AHL	2	0	0	0	0	1	0	0	0	0
2025–26	Coachella Valley Firebirds	AHL	69	13	6	19	24	12	0	1	1	2
AHL totals			71	13	6	19	24	13	0	1	1	2

=== International ===
Year	Team	Event	Result	GP	G	A	Pts	PIM
2022	Canada	HG18	1st place, gold medalist(s)	5	1	4	5	2
2024	Canada	WJC	5th	5	2	2	4	0
2025	Canada	WJC	5th	2	0	0	0	4
Junior totals				12	3	6	9	6
