= Nick Lardis =

Canadian ice hockey player (born 2005)

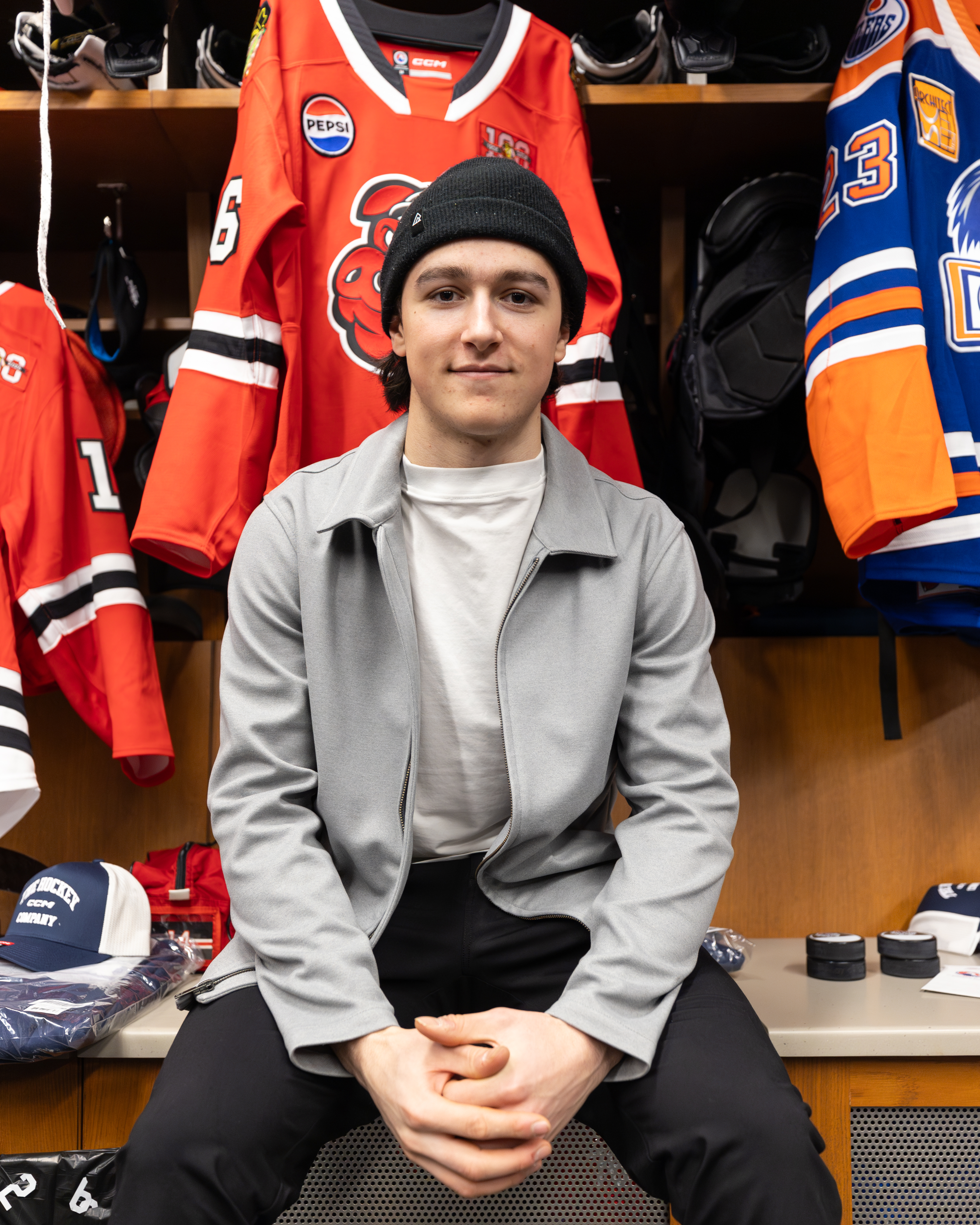
- Lardis in 2026
- Born: July 8, 2005 (age 21) Oakville, Ontario, Canada
- Height: 5 ft 11 in (180 cm)
- Weight: 165 lb (75 kg; 11 st 11 lb)
- Position: Winger
- Shoots: Left
- NHL team (P) Cur. team: Chicago Blackhawks; Rockford IceHogs (AHL)
- NHL draft: 67th overall, 2023; Chicago Blackhawks
- Playing career: 2024–present

Nick Lardis (born July 8, 2005) is a Canadian professional ice hockey player who is a winger for the Rockford IceHogs of the American Hockey League (AHL) while under contract to the Chicago Blackhawks of the National Hockey League (NHL). He was selected in the third round, 67th overall, by the Blackhawks in the 2023 NHL entry draft.

== Playing career ==
Lardis, a winger, played ice hockey for the local Oakville Rangers AAA program, scoring 57 points in 32 games with the under-15 team in 2019–20 before appearing in no games in 2020–21 due to the COVID-19 pandemic. In June 2021, he was selected by the Peterborough Petes with the sixth overall selection in the Ontario Hockey League (OHL) priority draft. In 2021–22, his first season with Peterborough, he appeared in 63 games and scored 18 goals and 37 points. He played in 36 games for the Petes in 2022–23, posting 12 goals and seven assists, before being sent to the Hamilton Bulldogs, scoring 25 goals and 21 assists in 33 games there.

Lardis was selected by the Chicago Blackhawks in the third round, with the 67th pick, of the 2023 NHL entry draft. He played mainly for the Brantford Bulldogs in the OHL during the 2023–24 season, posting 29 goals and 21 assists in 37 games, while also appearing in one game for the Rockford IceHogs of the American Hockey League (AHL). On April 3, 2024, Lardis signed a three-year, entry-level contract with the Blackhawks. In his last season in the OHL, 2024–25, he scored 71 goals and 46 assists for a total of 117 points in 65 regular season games, additionally posting 11 goals and four assists in seven playoff games. His 71 goals were a team record and the highest number by a forward in the OHL since John Tavares in 2006–07. Lardis was the recipient of the Jim Mahon Memorial Trophy as the OHL's leading goalscorer.

Lardis entered the 2025–26 season with the Rockford IceHogs in the AHL, being named the AHL Rookie of the Month for October 2025. He was recalled by the Blackhawks on December 13, and made his NHL debut that day in a 4–0 loss to the Detroit Red Wings, leading the team with eight shot attempts while playing for 15:32 minutes.

== International play ==
Medal record

Men's ice hockey

Representing Canada

U18 World Championships
| Bronze medal – third place | 2023 Switzerland | |

Lardis played for the Canada under-18 team at the 2023 World U18 Championships, scoring four goals through seven games and helping his team win the bronze medal.

== Personal life ==
Lardis was born on July 8, 2005, in Oakville, Ontario. In addition to playing hockey, he has also participated in track and field, golf, basketball, volleyball, and lacrosse.

== Career statistics ==
=== Regular season and playoffs ===
| | | | Regular season | | | | | Playoffs |
| Season | Team | League | GP | G | A | Pts | PIM | GP | G | A | Pts | PIM |
|---|---|---|---|---|---|---|---|---|---|---|---|---|
| 2021–22 | Peterborough Petes | OHL | 63 | 18 | 19 | 37 | 12 | 4 | 0 | 0 | 0 | 2 |
| 2022–23 | Peterborough Petes | OHL | 36 | 12 | 7 | 19 | 2 | — | — | — | — | — |
| 2022–23 | Hamilton Bulldogs | OHL | 33 | 25 | 21 | 46 | 4 | 6 | 5 | 5 | 10 | 2 |
| 2023–24 | Brantford Bulldogs | OHL | 37 | 29 | 21 | 50 | 12 | 6 | 4 | 4 | 8 | 0 |
| 2023–24 | Rockford IceHogs | AHL | 1 | 0 | 0 | 0 | 0 | — | — | — | — | — |
| 2024–25 | Brantford Bulldogs | OHL | 65 | 71 | 46 | 117 | 16 | 7 | 11 | 4 | 15 | 0 |
| 2025–26 | Rockford IceHogs | AHL | 35 | 18 | 14 | 32 | 12 | — | — | — | — | — |
| 2025–26 | Chicago Blackhawks | NHL | 41 | 10 | 5 | 15 | 10 | — | — | — | — | — |
| NHL totals | | | 41 | 10 | 5 | 15 | 10 | — | — | — | — | — |

=== International ===
| Year | Team | Event | Result | GP | G | A | Pts | PIM |
|---|---|---|---|---|---|---|---|---|
| 2023 | Canada | U18 | 3rd place, bronze medalist(s) | 7 | 4 | 0 | 4 | 2 |
| Junior totals | | | | 7 | 4 | 0 | 4 | 2 |

== Awards and honours ==
| Award | Year | Ref |
OHL
| First All-Star Team | 2025 | |
| Jim Mahon Memorial Trophy | 2025 | |
| CHL Second All-Star Team | 2025 | |
