= Colby Barlow =

Canadian ice hockey player (born 2005)

- Born: February 14, 2005 (age 21) Orillia, Ontario, Canada
- Height: 6 ft 0 in (183 cm)
- Weight: 190 lb (86 kg; 13 st 8 lb)
- Position: Left wing
- Shoots: Left
- NHL team (P) Cur. team: Winnipeg Jets; Manitoba Moose (AHL)
- NHL draft: 18th overall, 2023; Winnipeg Jets
- Playing career: 2024–present

Colby Barlow (born February 14, 2005) is a Canadian professional ice hockey left winger who plays for the Manitoba Moose in the American Hockey League (AHL) as a prospect under contract to the Winnipeg Jets of the National Hockey League (NHL), who selected him 18th overall in the 2023 NHL entry draft.

== Playing career ==
In the 2021–22 season season, his rookie year with the Owen Sound Attack, Barlow set a new franchise record for most goals by a first-year underage player, tallying 30 goals and totaling 47 points. The following season, 2022–23, he captained the team and posted 46 goals and 33 assists across 59 games. At the end of that campaign, he was honored with the Bobby Smith Trophy and named the CHL Scholastic Player of the Year.

After being chosen 18th overall in the first round of the 2023 NHL entry draft by the Winnipeg Jets, Barlow signed a three-year entry-level contract with the team on September 22, 2023.

On October 3, 2024, he was dealt to the Oshawa Generals by the Owen Sound Attack in a trade that involved two players and six draft picks going the other way.

== International play ==
Medal record

Representing Canada

Ice hockey

World U18 Championships
Bronze medal – third place	2023 Switzerland	

Hlinka Gretzky Cup
Gold medal – first place	2022 Canada	

Barlow represented Team Canada at the 2022 Hlinka Gretzky Cup, an international under-18 tournament showcasing some of the top young hockey talent in the world. Throughout five games, he made a significant offensive impact by registering four goals and four assists, finishing among the team’s leading scorers. His strong performance contributed to Canada’s dominant run through the tournament, culminating in a gold medal victory.

He played for Team Canada at the 2023 IIHF World U18 Championships, scoring three goals and adding one assist over six games, and helped the team secure a bronze medal.

== Career statistics ==
=== Regular season and playoffs ===
			Regular season					Playoffs
Season	Team	League	GP	G	A	Pts	PIM	GP	G	A	Pts	PIM
2021–22	Owen Sound Attack	OHL	59	30	17	47	18	7	5	1	6	8
2022–23	Owen Sound Attack	OHL	59	46	33	79	29	4	3	0	3	12
2023–24	Owen Sound Attack	OHL	50	40	18	58	27	4	1	2	3	2
2023–24	Manitoba Moose	AHL	3	1	2	3	0	—	—	—	—	—
2024–25	Owen Sound Attack	OHL	62	32	29	61	45	21	14	19	33	6
2025–26	Manitoba Moose	AHL	65	8	8	16	18	7	0	2	2	0
AHL totals			68	9	10	19	18	7	0	2	2	0

=== International ===
Year	Team	Event	Result	GP	G	A	Pts	PIM
2022	Canada	HG18	1st place, gold medalist(s)	5	2	3	5	2
2023	Canada	U18	3rd place, bronze medalist(s)	6	3	1	4	4
Junior totals				11	5	4	9	6

== Awards and honours ==
Award	Year
CHL
CHL Scholastic Player of the Year	2023
OHL
First All-Rookie Team	2022
First All-Star Team	2023
Bobby Smith Trophy	2023

Awards and achievements
Preceded by Brad Lambert	Winnipeg Jets first-round draft pick 2023	Succeeded by Sascha Boumedienne
