= Beckett Sennecke =

Canadian ice hockey player (born 2006)

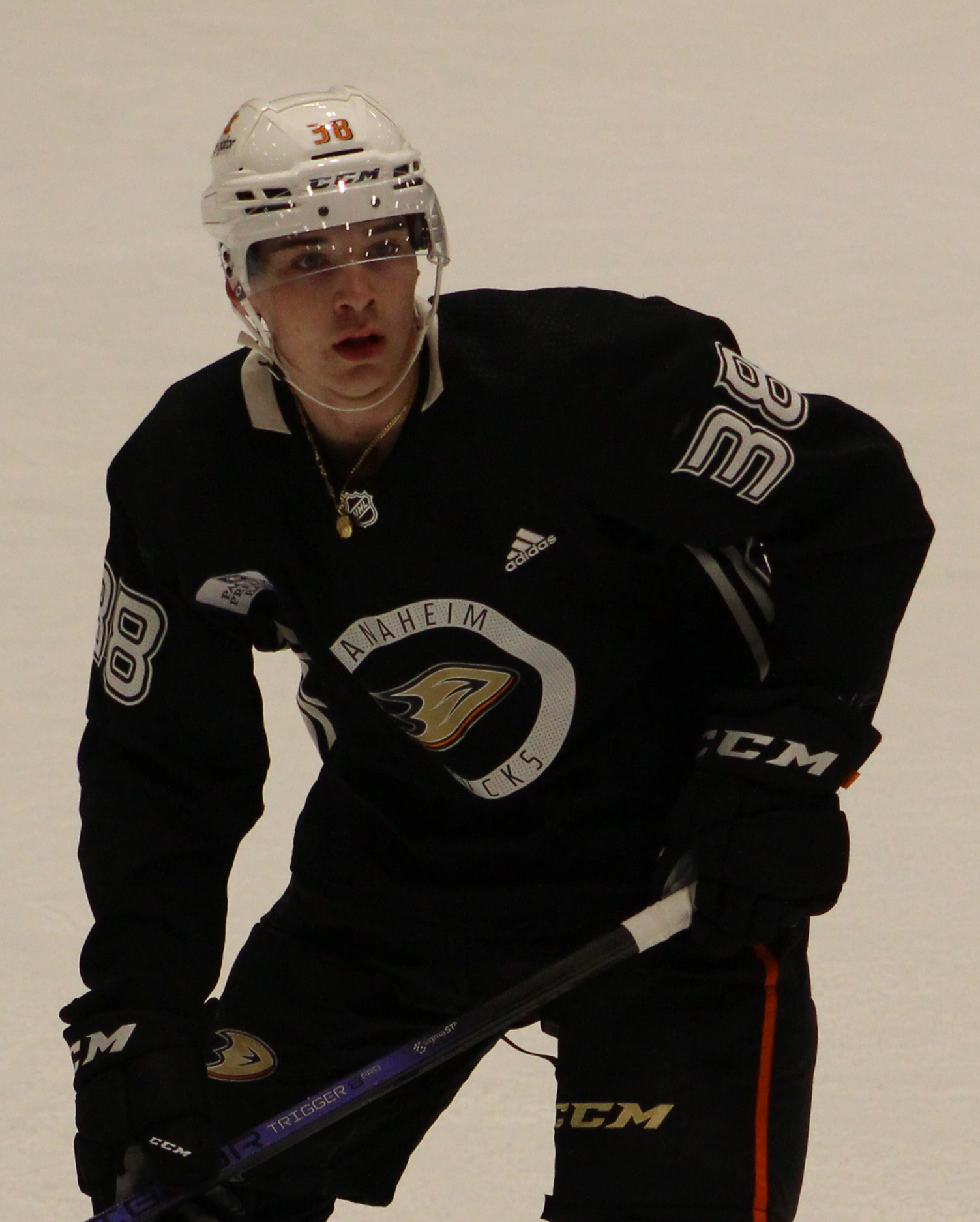
- Sennecke in 2024
- Born: January 28, 2006 (age 20) Toronto, Ontario, Canada
- Height: 6 ft 3 in (191 cm)
- Weight: 206 lb (93 kg; 14 st 10 lb)
- Position: Right wing
- Shoots: Right
- NHL team: Anaheim Ducks
- NHL draft: 3rd overall, 2024; Anaheim Ducks
- Playing career: 2025–present

Beckett Flynn Sennecke (born January 28, 2006) is a Canadian professional ice hockey player who is a right winger for the Anaheim Ducks of the National Hockey League (NHL). He was drafted third overall by the Ducks in the 2024 NHL entry draft.

== Playing career ==
=== Junior ===
Sennecke played for the Toronto Marlboros of the Greater Toronto Hockey League (GTHL) at the U14 and U16 levels. He played as a Center for the Marlboros (fellow NHL player Sam Dickinson was his winger) before transitioning to winger at the OHL level. He played at the U14 level during the 2019–20 season and at the U16 level during the 2021–22 season, where he scored 35 goals for 80 points in 45 games.

At the 2022 Ontario Hockey League (OHL) draft, Sennecke was selected eighth overall by the Oshawa Generals. He scored his first OHL goal in the first game of the 2022–23 season, a 2–1 victory over the Barrie Colts on September 29, 2022.

In the 2023–24 season, Sennecke ranked third on the Generals with 27 goals and 68 points in 63 games, and led the team with 207 shots and seven game-winning goals. In the playoffs, he added 10 goals and 22 points as the Generals made a run to the OHL finals. He did not play in the finals, however, due to an injury sustained in game six of the conference finals against the North Bay Battalion.

Over the course of the season, Sennecke was one of the biggest risers in rankings for the 2024 NHL entry draft. Initially seen as a late first-round pick, the consensus by fans, scouts, and analysts was that he would be taken in the top 20, with some viewing him among the top 10 eligible players. His rise was partly due to a growth spurt that saw him grow five inches (13 cm) in two years from 5 ft 10 in (1.78 m) as an OHL rookie to nearly 6 ft 3 in (1.91 m) in June 2024. He would ultimately be taken third overall by the Anaheim Ducks. Aware that he was not viewed as a top-tier prospect in the draft class and not having talked with the Ducks organization since the draft combine three weeks earlier, Sennecke was visibly shocked at the pick. He signed an entry-level contract with the Ducks on July 5.

On September 5, 2024, Sennecke suffered a fractured foot during off-season training and was expected to miss six to eight weeks. Soon after his return to the Generals, he was named the OHL player of the month for December, having recorded 9 goals and 13 assists in eight games in that span. He ultimately finished the 2024–25 season with 36 goals and 50 assists in 56 games, and was named an OHL Third Team All-Star. Sennecke then led the Generals on a deep run to the OHL finals. They were ultimately defeated by the London Knights, ending their postseason. Sennecke had 14 goals and 18 assists in 18 playoff games.

=== Professional ===
Sennecke played his first NHL game on October 9, 2025, scoring the lone goal in a 3–1 loss to the Seattle Kraken. On January 25, 2026, Sennecke recorded his first NHL hat-trick with the overtime game-winning goal in a 4–3 win against the Calgary Flames. He appeared in all 82 games for Anaheim in the 2025–26 season, tying defender Matthew Schaefer of the New York Islanders for the rookie goal-scoring lead (23), and finishing second in both assists (37) and points (60) behind Montreal Canadiens forward Ivan Demidov. Sennecke was credited with a major role in the Ducks' successful season, which saw them qualifying for the 2026 Stanley Cup playoffs, their first postseason appearance since 2018. In recognition of his achievements, the Professional Hockey Writers' Association voted him a finalist for the Calder Memorial Trophy, awarded to the NHL's rookie of the year. He was later named to the NHL All-Rookie Team. During the Ducks' first round playoff series against the Edmonton Oilers, he scored his first playoff goal during game three on April 24.

== International play ==
Sennecke represented Team Canada White at the 2022 World U-17 Hockey Challenge, recording three assists in five games and finishing in sixth of seven teams. He was invited to the Team Canada junior team tryouts ahead of the 2025 World Junior Championship before eventually being cut from the roster.

== Personal life ==
Sennecke is the son of interior designer, television personality, and former Canada women's national volleyball team member Candice Olson and her husband Jurij. He has an older sister, with whom he attended figure skating practices from a young age.

== Career statistics ==
=== Regular season and playoffs ===
			Regular season					Playoffs
Season	Team	League	GP	G	A	Pts	PIM	GP	G	A	Pts	PIM
2022–23	Oshawa Generals	OHL	61	20	35	55	44	5	1	0	1	4
2023–24	Oshawa Generals	OHL	63	27	41	68	67	16	10	12	22	21
2024–25	Oshawa Generals	OHL	56	36	50	86	66	18	14	18	32	32
2025–26	Anaheim Ducks	NHL	82	23	37	60	62	12	5	1	6	4
NHL totals			82	23	37	60	62	12	5	1	6	4

=== International ===
Year	Team	Event	Result	GP	G	A	Pts	PIM
2022	Canada White	U17	6th	5	0	3	3	2
Junior totals				5	0	3	3	2

== Awards and honours ==
Award	Year	Ref
OHL
Second All-Rookie Team	2024	
Third All-Star Team	2025	
League
NHL All-Rookie Team	2026	

Awards and achievements
Preceded by Leo Carlsson	Anaheim Ducks first-round draft pick 2024	Succeeded by Stian Solberg
