= Sam Dickinson (ice hockey) =

Canadian ice hockey player (born 2006)

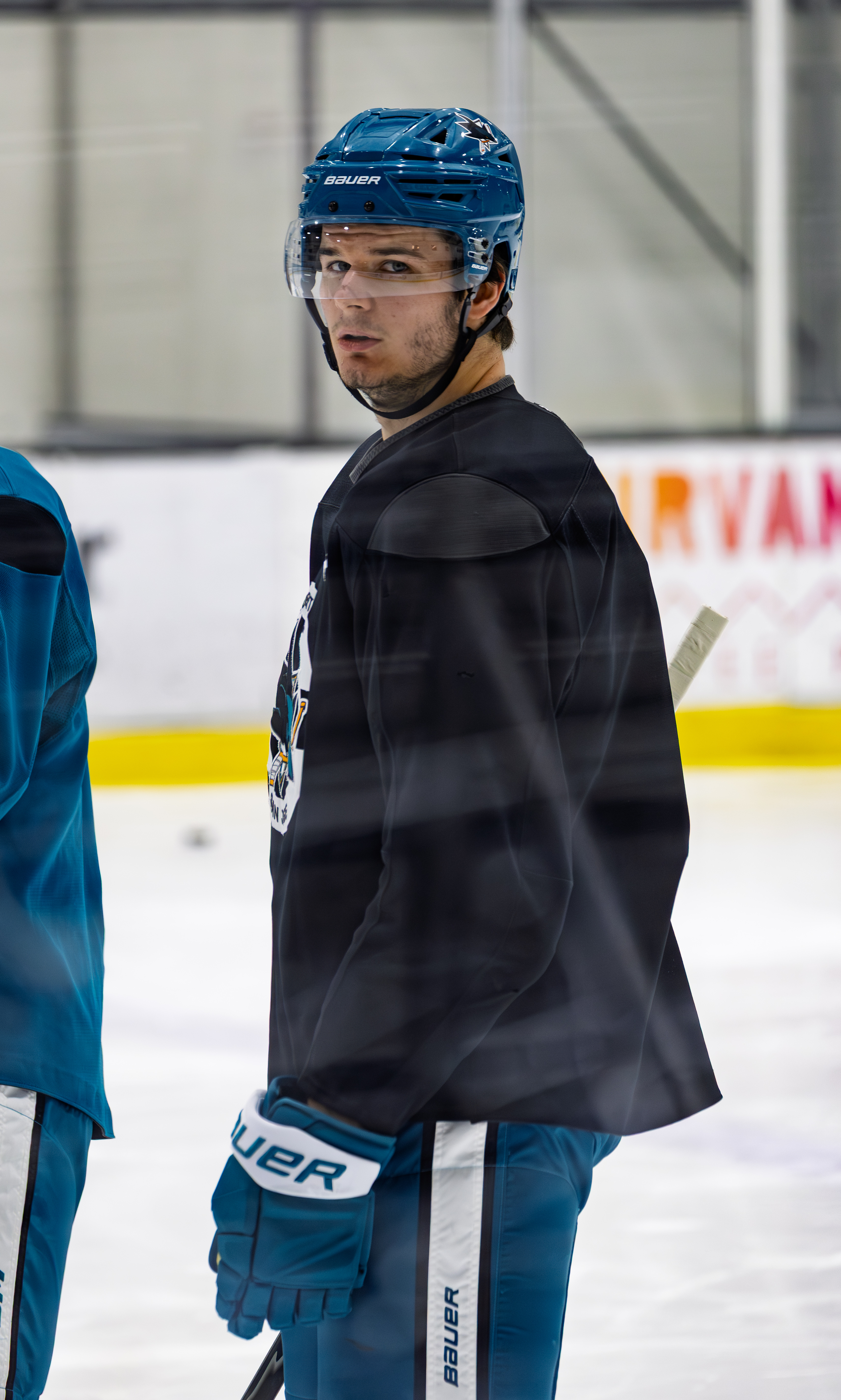
- Dickinson with the San Jose Sharks in April 2026
- Born: June 7, 2006 (age 20) Toronto, Ontario, Canada
- Height: 6 ft 3 in (191 cm)
- Weight: 200 lb (91 kg; 14 st 4 lb)
- Position: Defence
- Shoots: Left
- NHL team: San Jose Sharks
- NHL draft: 11th overall, 2024; San Jose Sharks
- Playing career: 2025–present

Sam Dickinson (born June 7, 2006) is a Canadian professional ice hockey player who is a defenceman for the San Jose Sharks of the National Hockey League (NHL). He was drafted 11th overall by the Sharks in the 2024 NHL entry draft.

== Playing career ==
=== Minor League ===
Dickinson played for the Toronto Marlboros of the Greater Toronto Hockey League (GTHL) at the U14, U15, and U16 levels. He was a winger for fellow GTHL player and future NHL player Beckett Sennecke before eventually transitioning to play as a defenseman around age fourteen. Dickinson also played high school hockey at St. Michael's College School in Toronto.

=== OHL ===
After being selected fourth overall in the 2022 Ontario Hockey League (OHL) draft by the Niagara IceDogs, the team was unable to secure a meeting with Dickinson's representation or family, and his OHL rights were traded to the London Knights in exchange for seven draft picks. Although he was also selected in the United States Hockey League draft by the Chicago Steel, he ultimately chose to sign with London.

In his first year of major junior play, the 2022–23 season, Dickinson recorded nine goals and 23 points in 62 regular season games. In 21 playoff games, he added four goals and eight points as the Knights reached the OHL Finals, after which he returned to Toronto to train with St. Michael's. He was named to the OHL First All-Rookie Team following the season.

With the departure of Logan Mailloux, Dickinson assumed a leading role on the Knights' blue line during the 2023–24 season. He further distinguished himself during a fourteen-game stretch from December 14 to January 20, when the Knights were without top players Easton Cowan and Oliver Bonk due to their participation in the 2024 World Junior Ice Hockey Championships. Despite these absences, the Knights won all fourteen games, rising to the top of the OHL standings. Dickinson was named OHL player of the week for the week ending January 1, 2024. At the 2024 CHL/NHL Top Prospects Game, he served as captain of Team Red. He finished with 70 points in 68 regular season games, fourth in defenceman scoring in the league, while the Knights received the Hamilton Spectator Trophy as the top team in the regular season. He was subsequently named to the OHL's Second All-Star Team. The Knights reached the OHL Finals for the second consecutive year, this time winning the J. Ross Robertson Cup as league champions. Dickinson thereafter played in the 2024 Memorial Cup, where the Knights lost the championship game to the Saginaw Spirit.

At the 2024 NHL entry draft, Dickinson was drafted 11th overall by the San Jose Sharks. He signed his entry-level contract with the Sharks on July 10, 2024. In 55 games with the Knights during the 2024–25 season, he had 29 goals and 62 assists, setting a new franchise record for points by a defenceman. Dickinson led the OHL in plus minus rating (+64), and received the Max Kaminsky Trophy as OHL defenceman of the year, as well as being named a First Team All-Star. In the playoffs, the Knights made another run to the championship final, defeating the Oshawa Generals to claim their second consecutive Robertson Cup. At the 2025 Memorial Cup, the Knights reached the final for a second consecutive year, this time defeating the Medicine Hat Tigers for the title. Dickinson was named to the Memorial Cup All-Star Team, and called the outcome "what we've been working for for three years." Following the end of the postseason, he received the CHL Defenceman of the Year honour, and was named a First Team All-Star.

=== NHL ===
Dickinson made his National Hockey League (NHL) debut with the San Jose Sharks on October 11, 2025, against the Anaheim Ducks. He recorded his first NHL point during the early part of his rookie season. On November 2, 2025, Dickinson scored his first NHL goal, tying a game late in the third period against the Detroit Red Wings.

After appearing in his tenth game of the season, Dickinson remained with the Sharks for the duration of the campaign, surpassing the threshold for his entry-level contract to take effect.

== International play ==
Medal record

Representing Canada

Ice hockey

Hlinka Gretzky Cup
| Gold medal – first place | 2023 Czechia/Slovakia | |

Dickinson captained Team Canada Black at the World U-17 Hockey Challenge, registering a goal and an assist in seven games and received tournament all-star honours.

Dickinson won a gold medal at the 2023 Hlinka Gretzky Cup, where he was the alternate captain of Team Canada.

== Career statistics ==
=== Regular season and playoffs ===
| | | | Regular season | | | | | Playoffs |
| Season | Team | League | GP | G | A | Pts | PIM | GP | G | A | Pts | PIM |
|---|---|---|---|---|---|---|---|---|---|---|---|---|
| 2021–22 | Aurora Tigers | OJHL | 1 | 0 | 0 | 0 | 0 | 2 | 0 | 1 | 1 | 0 |
| 2022–23 | London Knights | OHL | 62 | 9 | 14 | 23 | 12 | 21 | 4 | 4 | 8 | 0 |
| 2023–24 | London Knights | OHL | 68 | 18 | 52 | 70 | 30 | 18 | 4 | 9 | 13 | 12 |
| 2024–25 | London Knights | OHL | 55 | 29 | 62 | 91 | 39 | 17 | 9 | 22 | 31 | 2 |
| 2025–26 | San Jose Sharks | NHL | 72 | 1 | 13 | 14 | 22 | — | — | — | — | — |
| NHL totals | | | 72 | 1 | 13 | 14 | 22 | — | — | — | — | — |

=== International ===
| Year | Team | Event | Result | GP | G | A | Pts | PIM |
|---|---|---|---|---|---|---|---|---|
| 2022 | Canada Black | U17 | 4th | 7 | 1 | 1 | 2 | 2 |
| 2023 | Canada | HG18 | 1st place, gold medalist(s) | 5 | 0 | 3 | 3 | 10 |
| 2025 | Canada | WJC | 5th | 5 | 0 | 2 | 2 | 8 |
| 2026 | Canada | WC | 4th | 2 | 0 | 0 | 0 | 0 |
| Junior totals | | | | 17 | 1 | 6 | 7 | 20 |
| Senior totals | | | | 2 | 0 | 0 | 0 | 0 |

== Awards and honours ==
| Award | Year | Ref |
CHL
| Memorial Cup All-Star Team | 2025 | |
| Memorial Cup champion | 2025 | |
| CHL Defenceman of the Year | 2025 | |
| First All-Star Team | 2025 | |
OHL
| First All-Rookie Team | 2023 | |
| J. Ross Robertson Cup champion | 2024, 2025 | |
| Second All-Star Team | 2024 | |
| Max Kaminsky Trophy | 2025 | |
| First All-Star Team | 2025 | |

Awards and achievements
| Preceded by Macklin Celebrini | San Jose Sharks first-round draft pick 2024 | Succeeded by Michael Misa |
