= Ilya Protas =

Belarusian hockey player (born 2006)

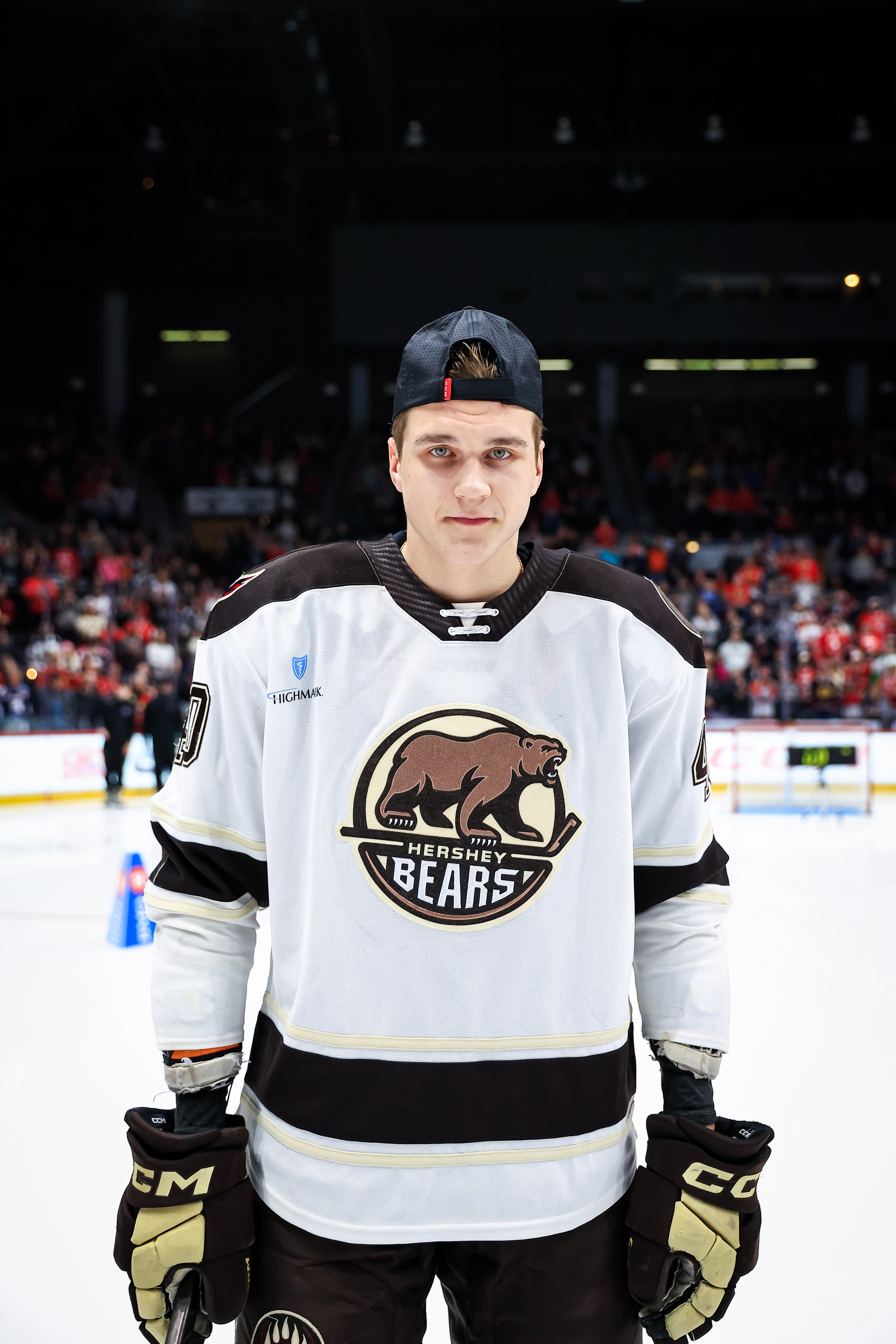
- Protas with the Hershey Bears in 2026
- Born: July 18, 2006 (age 20) Vitebsk, Belarus
- Height: 6 ft 6 in (198 cm)
- Weight: 225 lb (102 kg; 16 st 1 lb)
- Position: Forward
- Shoots: Left
- NHL team: Washington Capitals
- NHL draft: 75th overall, 2024; Washington Capitals
- Playing career: 2025–present

Ilya Protas (Belarusian: Илья Уладзіміравіч Протас, Russian: Илья Владимирович Протас; born July 18, 2006) is a Belarusian professional ice hockey player who is a forward for the Washington Capitals of the National Hockey League (NHL). He made his professional debut in 2024 with the Hershey Bears of the American Hockey League (AHL).

== Playing career ==
Protas began his junior career in 2023 playing for the Des Moines Buccaneers of the United States Hockey League (USHL). While playing for Des Moines, he was drafted 75th overall in the 2024 NHL entry draft by the Washington Capitals. He played in 61 games for the Buccaneers, scoring 14 goals and assisting on 37, for a total of 51 points.

For the 2024–25 season, Protas joined the Windsor Spitfires of the Ontario Hockey League (OHL). Playing in 61 games, Protas scored 50 goals and assisted on 74, for a total of 124 points. In twelve playoff games, he scored 5 goals and had 20 assists, for a total of 25 points.

Protas began the 2025–26 season playing for the Hershey Bears of the American Hockey League. In 66 games, Protas scored 28 goals and 34 assists, for a total 62 points. Protas was called up to the Capitals on April 6, 2026. Protas scored his first NHL point during a 4–0 victory against the Toronto Maple Leafs on April 8, 2026, his debut game. He then scored his first career NHL goal in a 6–3 win over the Pittsburgh Penguins on April 11, 2026. He finished the NHL season with one goal and three assists in four games. On April 15, 2026, Protas was loaned back to Hershey. On April 23, 2026, Protas was awarded the Dudley "Red" Garrett Memorial Award, given to the rookie of the year in the AHL.

== Personal life ==
Protas' older brother, Aliaksei, was drafted by the Capitals in the third round of the 2019 NHL entry draft.

== Career statistics ==
			Regular season					Playoffs
Season	Team	League	GP	G	A	Pts	PIM	GP	G	A	Pts	PIM
2022–23	Team Belarus U17	BEL-2	29	19	15	34	37	2	1	0	1	0
2022–23	Team Belarus U18	BEL-2	10	5	4	9	0	11	4	2	6	2
2023–24	Des Moines Buccaneers	USHL	61	14	37	61	14	—	—	—	—	—
2024–25	Windsor Spitfires	OHL	61	50	74	124	34	12	5	20	25	6
2025–26	Hershey Bears	AHL	69	29	37	66	40	6	2	4	6	6
2025–26	Washington Capitals	NHL	4	1	3	4	2	—	—	—	—	—
NHL totals			4	1	3	4	2	—	—	—	—	—

== Awards and honours ==
Award	Year	Ref
USHL
USHL All-Rookie Team	2024	
OHL
OHL All-Star Second team	2025	
William Hanley Trophy	2025	
AHL
AHL All-Star Game	2026	
Dudley "Red" Garrett Memorial Award	2026	
