= Michael Misa =

Canadian ice hockey player (born 2007)

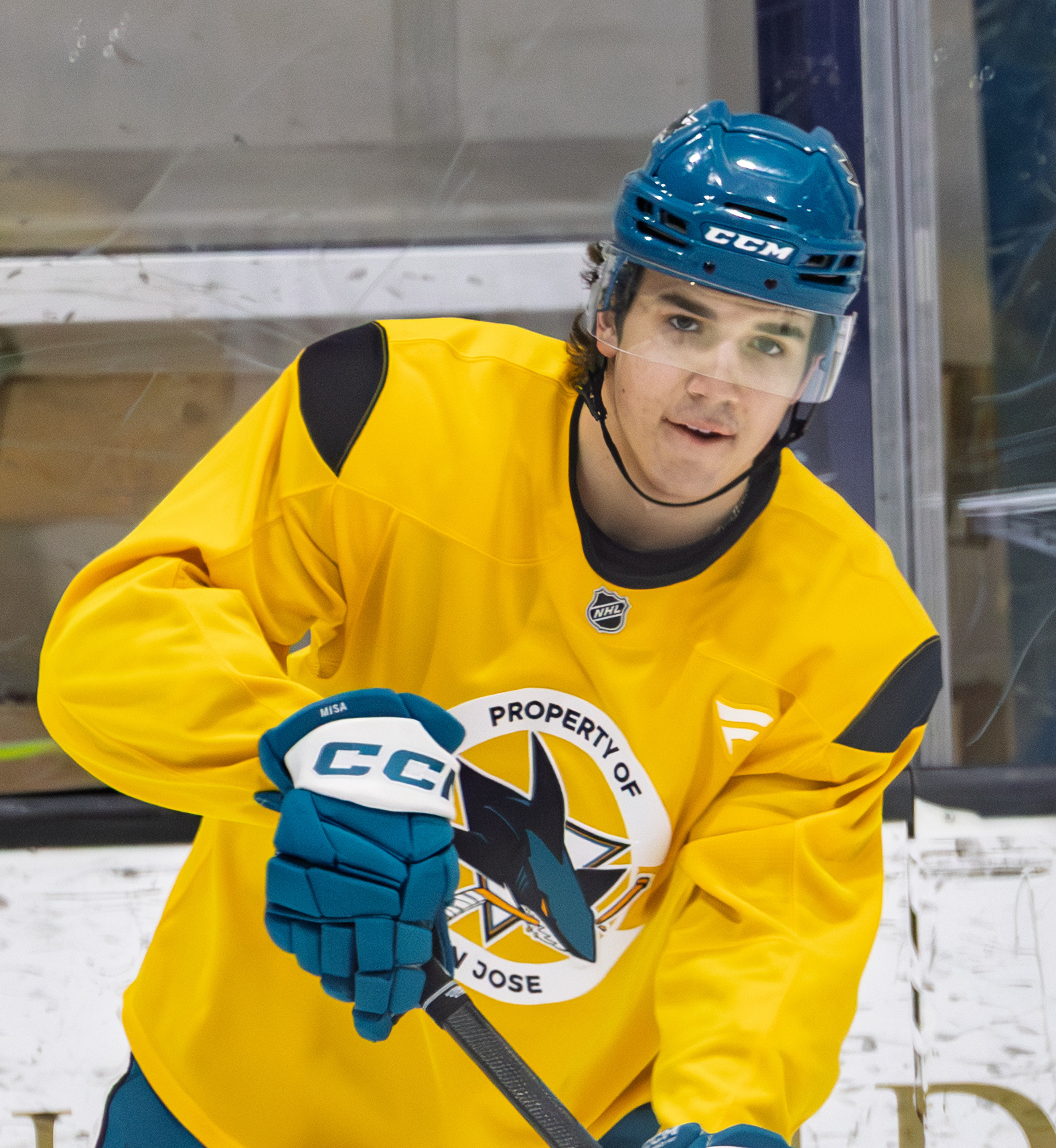
- Misa with the San Jose Sharks in April 2026
- Born: February 16, 2007 (age 19) Oakville, Ontario, Canada
- Height: 6 ft 1 in (185 cm)
- Weight: 185 lb (84 kg; 13 st 3 lb)
- Position: Centre
- Shoots: Left
- NHL team: San Jose Sharks
- NHL draft: 2nd overall, 2025; San Jose Sharks
- Playing career: 2025–present

Michael Misa (born February 16, 2007) is a Canadian professional ice hockey player who is a centre for the San Jose Sharks of the National Hockey League (NHL). He was selected by the Sharks second overall in the 2025 NHL entry draft.

== Early life ==
Misa was born to Frank and Sandra Misa in Oakville, Ontario in February 2007, his older brother Luke was born two years prior in 2005.

== Playing career ==
At the 2022 OHL Cup, Misa had 20 points in seven games to beat Connor McDavid's record for tournament scoring.

In April 2022, Misa was granted exceptional player status to enter the Ontario Hockey League (OHL) for the 2022–23 season, becoming the eighth player to be granted exceptional status, the previous being Shane Wright. A few weeks later, he was selected first overall at the 2022 OHL draft by the Saginaw Spirit. In his OHL debut on October 1, 2022, a 10–6 victory over the Guelph Storm, he recorded two goals. Despite missing six weeks with a fractured tibia, he had the most productive season for an exceptional-status player in OHL history, achieving 1.24 points per game, ahead of John Tavares' 1.18, Wright's 1.14, and McDavid's 1.05. Misa would go on to win the Emms Family Award as OHL rookie of the year.

Appearing in 67 games during the 2023–24 season, Misa had 29 goals and 46 assists. His point-per-game rate was lower than the prior season, which Saginaw's general manager attributed to his playing fewer minutes as a result of the team acquiring veteran junior players like Owen Beck. The Spirit made a deep run in the OHL playoffs to the Western Conference Final, but were defeated by the London Knights in six games. However, as the hosts, the team still participated in the 2024 Memorial Cup against the champions of the CHL's three leagues. Misa distinguished himself during the team's round robin game against the Drummondville Voltigeurs, registering three assists in a 4–3 comeback victory and being named player of the game. The Spirit reached the championship game, a rematch with the London Knights, and defeated them to claim the franchise's first Memorial Cup.

In January 2025, Misa was named the 26th captain in Saginaw history. He finished the 2024–25 OHL season first in league scoring with 134 points, tying with Patrick Kane for most goals in a draft-eligible season with 62. In addition to receiving the Eddie Powers Memorial Trophy in recognition of his leading the league in scoring, Misa was awarded the Red Tilson Trophy as the most valuable player of the OHL regular season. As well, he was named scholastic player of the year, and a First Team All-Star. The Spirit were eliminated in the first round of the OHL playoffs by the Erie Otters, with Misa missing the final game of the series. He was named a CHL First Team All-Star, and received the CHL Top Scorer Award for having led all three major junior leagues in points.

In advance of the 2025 NHL entry draft, Misa was given the E. J. McGuire Award of Excellence by the NHL Central Scouting Bureau as their choice for the player who best exemplifies "commitment to excellence through strength of character, competitiveness and athleticism." He was drafted second overall by the San Jose Sharks. On September 10, 2025, Misa signed a three-year entry-level contract with the Sharks. He scored his first career NHL goal on October 26, 2025, his fifth game, during a 6–5 victory over the Minnesota Wild.

== International play ==
Medal record

Men's ice hockey

Representing Canada

World Junior Championships
Bronze medal – third place	2026 United States	

Hlinka Gretzky Cup
Gold medal – first place	2023 Czech Republic/Slovakia	

Misa won a gold medal representing Canada in the 2023 Hlinka Gretzky Cup, finishing the tournament with eight points in five games.

In December 2025, he was selected to represent Canada at the 2026 World Junior Ice Hockey Championships. During the tournament he recorded two goals and five assists in seven games and won a bronze medal.

== Personal life ==
His older brother, Luke Misa, was drafted in the fifth round of the 2024 NHL entry draft by the Calgary Flames.

As of 2026, he lives with fellow San Jose Sharks teammate, Sam Dickinson.

== Career statistics ==
=== Regular season and playoffs ===
Bold indicates led league

			Regular season					Playoffs
Season	Team	League	GP	G	A	Pts	PIM	GP	G	A	Pts	PIM
2022–23	Saginaw Spirit	OHL	45	22	34	56	10	11	3	5	8	6
2023–24	Saginaw Spirit	OHL	67	29	46	75	26	17	4	7	11	2
2024–25	Saginaw Spirit	OHL	65	62	72	**134**	45	4	2	1	3	0
2025–26	San Jose Sharks	NHL	45	9	12	21	10	—	—	—	—	—
2025–26	San Jose Barracuda	AHL	2	0	1	1	0	—	—	—	—	—
NHL totals			45	9	12	21	10	—	—	—	—	—

=== International ===
Year	Team	Event	Result	GP	G	A	Pts	PIM
2022	Canada Red	U17	2nd place, silver medalist(s)	7	3	3	6	0
2023	Canada	HG18	1st place, gold medalist(s)	5	2	6	8	0
2026	Canada	WJC	3rd place, bronze medalist(s)	7	2	5	7	4
Junior totals				19	7	14	21	4

== Awards and honours ==
Award	Year	Ref
CHL
All-Rookie Team	2023	
Memorial Cup champion	2024	
CHL Top Scorer Award	2025	
First All-Star Team	2025	
OHL
First All-Rookie Team	2023	
Emms Family Award	2023	
Eddie Powers Memorial Trophy	2025	
Bobby Smith Trophy	2025	
Red Tilson Trophy	2025	
First All-Star Team	2025	
NHL
E.J. McGuire Award of Excellence	2025	

Awards and achievements
Preceded by Sam Dickinson	San Jose Sharks first-round draft pick 2025	Succeeded by Joshua Ravensbergen
