= 2024–25 OHL season =

- League: Ontario Hockey League
- Sport: Hockey
- Duration: Preseason; August 30, 2024 – September 22, 2024; Regular season September 25, 2024 – March 23, 2025; Playoffs; March 27, 2025 – May 15, 2025
- Teams: 20
- TV partner(s): Rogers TV; YourTV; TSN

Draft
- Top draft pick: Ethan Belchetz
- Picked by: Windsor Spitfires

Regular season
- Hamilton Spectator Trophy: London Knights (7)
- Season MVP: Michael Misa (Saginaw Spirit)
- Top scorer: Michael Misa (Saginaw Spirit)

Playoffs
- Playoffs MVP: Kasper Halttunen (Knights)
- Finals champions: London Knights (6)
- Runners-up: Oshawa Generals

OHL seasons
- 2023–24 2025–26

2024–25 CHL season
- League: Canadian Hockey League
- Sport: Hockey
- Duration: OHL; September 2024 – May 2025; QMJHL; September 2024 – May 2025; WHL; September 2024 – May 2025
- Teams: 60
- TV partner(s): CBC Television/Gem, TSN, RDS, Rogers TV, Shaw TV
- Season MVP: Gavin McKenna (Medicine Hat Tigers) (WHL)
- Top scorer: Michael Misa (Saginaw Spirit) (OHL)

Memorial Cup
- Finals champions: London Knights (OHL) (3rd title)
- Runners-up: Medicine Hat Tigers (WHL)

The 2024–25 OHL season was the 45th season of operation (44th season of play) of the Ontario Hockey League. The league played a 68-game regular season which began on September 25, 2024 and concluded on March 23, 2025. The post-season began on March 27, 2025 and concluded on May 15, 2025.

The London Knights won the J. Ross Robertson Cup and represented the Ontario Hockey League at the 2025 Memorial Cup, which was hosted by the Rimouski Océanic of the Quebec Maritimes Junior Hockey League. The tournament was held at Colisée Financière Sun Life in Rimouski, Quebec. The Knights won the Memorial Cup, defeating the Medicine Hat Tigers of the Western Hockey League in the final game of the tournament.

== Off-season ==
=== Commissioner ===
On June 12, 2024, the OHL appointed Bryan Crawford as Incoming Commissioner of the league. He began his tenure on August 6, 2024. Crawford took over for David Branch, who held the position since 1979.

=== Relocation ===
On June 13, 2024, the OHL Board of Governors approved the relocation of the Mississauga Steelheads to Brampton. The team was rebranded as the Brampton Steelheads and play out of the CAA Centre.

Brampton previously hosted an OHL team, as the Brampton Battalion played in the league from 1998 to 2013. The Battalion relocated to North Bay and are currently the North Bay Battalion.

The Steelheads played their first ever regular season game in Brampton on September 27, 2024 against the Brantford Bulldogs. Porter Martone scored the first goal for the Steelheads and was named the first star of the game, as he scored a goal and added three assists. Jack Ivankovic stopped all 21 shots he saw, as the Steelheads shutout the Bulldogs 7-0 in front of 2,277 fans.

=== Affiliation ===
On July 17, 2024, the Erie Otters announced an affiliation agreement with the GOJHL's Port Colborne Sailors.

== Pre-season ==
On June 27, 2024, the OHL announced the preseason schedule for the 2024–25 season. In total, there was 45 preseason games which began on August 30th and concluded on September 22nd.

This year's schedule had a pre-season showcase at the Kitchener Memorial Auditorium over Labour Day weekend that included the host team, the Kitchener Rangers, as well as the Brantford Bulldogs, Erie Otters and Saginaw Spirit.

Neutral site games include:

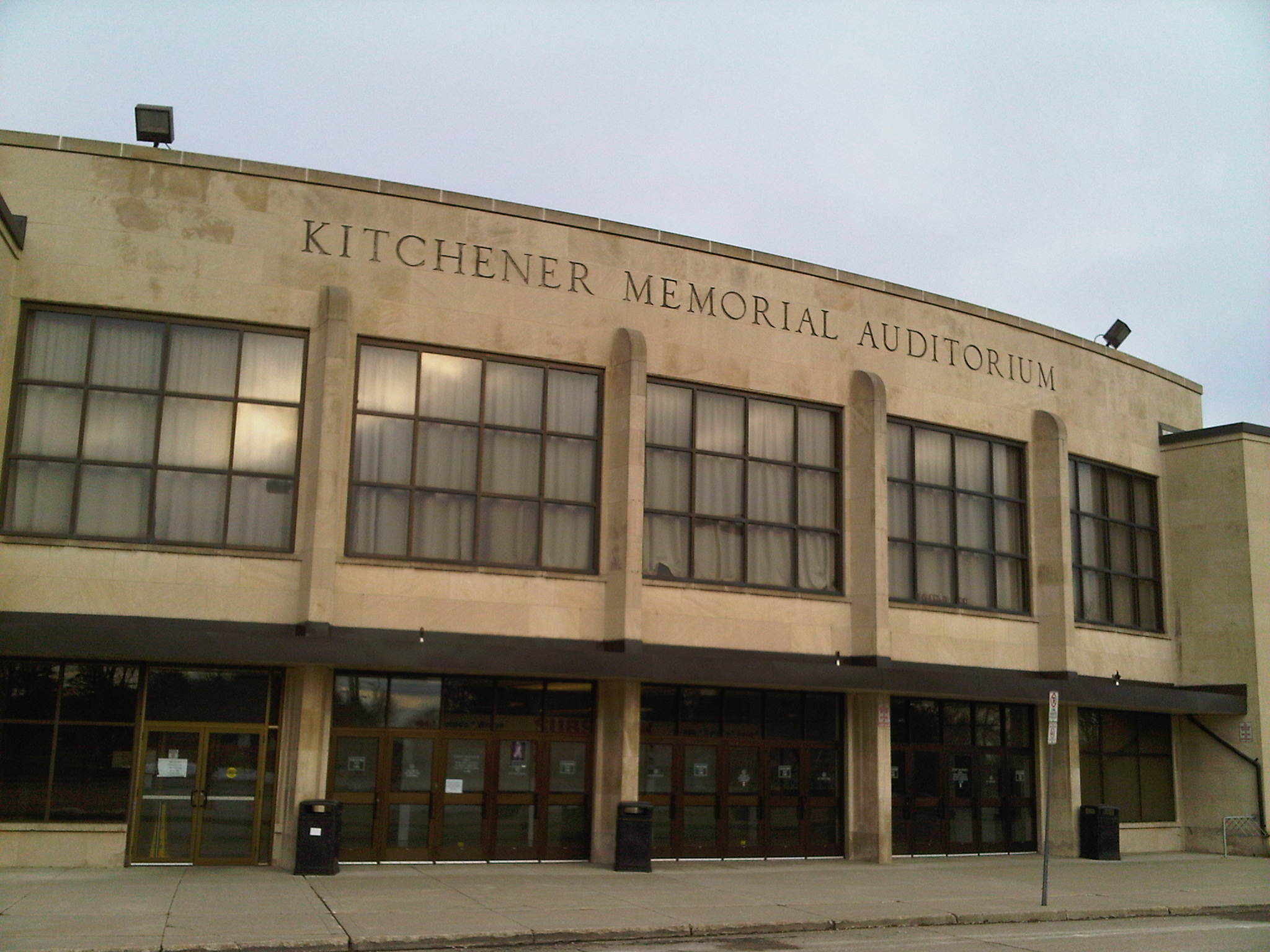
The Kitchener Memorial Auditorium hosted the pre-season showcase over Labour Day weekend.

- Brantford Bulldogs at Saginaw Spirit at the Kitchener Memorial Auditorium in Kitchener, Ontario on August 30th.
- Erie Otters at Brantford Bulldogs at the Kitchener Memorial Auditorium in Kitchener, Ontario on August 31st.
- Erie Otters at Saginaw Spirit at the Kitchener Memorial Auditorium in Kitchener, Ontario at September 1st.
- Niagara IceDogs at Peterborough Petes at the Jack Burger Sports Complex in Port Hope, Ontario on September 1st.
- London Knights at Erie Otters at the Joe Thornton Community Centre in St. Thomas, Ontario on September 7th.
- Sudbury Wolves at Peterborough Petes at the Asphodel-Norwood Community Centre in Asphodel-Norwood, Ontario on September 8th.
- Windsor Spitfires at Flint Firebirds at Flint Iceland Arena in Flint, Michigan on September 8th.
- Flint Firebirds at Windsor Spitfires at Vollmer Recreation Centre in LaSalle, Ontario on September 19th.
- Oshawa Generals at Erie Otters at Dunnville Memorial Arena in Dunnville, Ontario on September 20th.
- Kingston Frontenacs at Ottawa 67's at the Cornwall Civic Complex in Cornwall, Ontario on September 21st.
- Guelph Storm at Peterborough Petes at the Cavan Monaghan Community Centre in Millbrook, Ontario on September 21st.
- Niagara IceDogs at Windsor Spitfires at the Atlas Tube Recreation Centre in Belle River, Ontario.

OHL training camps began in late August in preparation of the 2024-25 season, which began on September 25, 2024.

== Regular season ==
=== Final standings ===
Note: DIV = Division; GP = Games played; W = Wins; L = Losses; OTL = Overtime losses; SL = Shootout losses; GF = Goals for; GA = Goals against;
PTS = Points; x = clinched playoff berth; y = clinched division title; z = clinched conference title

==== Eastern conference ====
Rank	Team	DIV	GP	W	L	OTL	SOL	Pts	ROW	GF	GA
1	z-Brantford Bulldogs	East	68	44	19	5	0	93	41	281	221
2	y-Barrie Colts	Central	68	42	22	2	2	88	40	250	219
3	x-Kingston Frontenacs	East	68	40	20	5	3	88	38	281	232
4	x-Oshawa Generals	East	68	41	21	4	2	88	37	261	218
5	x-Brampton Steelheads	Central	68	36	22	10	0	82	34	298	240
6	x-Sudbury Wolves	Central	68	32	31	5	0	69	32	245	269
7	x-Niagara IceDogs	Central	68	29	31	4	4	66	28	247	303
8	x-North Bay Battalion	Central	68	28	34	6	0	62	25	194	252
9	Ottawa 67's	East	68	24	34	4	6	58	22	203	270
10	Peterborough Petes	East	68	18	41	4	5	45	13	172	277

==== Western conference ====
Rank	Team	DIV	GP	W	L	OTL	SOL	Pts	ROW	GF	GA
1	z-London Knights	Midwest	68	55	11	2	0	112	52	325	180
2	y-Windsor Spitfires	West	68	45	17	4	2	96	45	309	223
3	x-Kitchener Rangers	Midwest	68	47	15	4	2	100	42	254	183
4	x-Saginaw Spirit	West	68	38	27	2	1	79	35	324	274
5	x-Erie Otters	Midwest	68	34	28	4	2	74	31	248	261
6	x-Flint Firebirds	West	68	29	34	2	3	63	26	229	249
7	x-Sault Ste. Marie Greyhounds	West	68	29	35	2	2	62	27	226	268
8	x-Owen Sound Attack	Midwest	68	26	35	4	3	59	24	211	253
9	Sarnia Sting	West	68	22	33	6	7	57	20	197	286
10	Guelph Storm	Midwest	68	21	38	5	4	51	20	226	301

=== Scoring leaders ===
Note: GP = Games played; G = Goals; A = Assists; Pts = Points; PIM = Penalty minutes

Player	Team	GP	G	A	Pts	PIM
Michael Misa	Saginaw Spirit	65	62	72	134	45
Ilya Protas	Windsor Spitfires	61	50	74	124	34
Liam Greentree	Windsor Spitfires	64	49	70	119	59
Nick Lardis	Brantford Bulldogs	65	71	46	117	16
Zayne Parekh	Saginaw Spirit	61	33	74	107	96
Patrick Thomas	Brantford Bulldogs	66	27	77	104	10
Porter Martone	Brampton Steelheads	57	37	61	98	74
Jake O'Brien	Brantford Bulldogs	66	32	66	98	18
Kieron Walton	Sudbury Wolves	66	38	54	92	43
Sam Dickinson	London Knights	55	29	62	91	39

=== Leading goaltenders ===
Note: GP = Games played; Mins = Minutes played; W = Wins; L = Losses: OTL = Overtime losses;
SL = Shootout losses; GA = Goals Allowed; SO = Shutouts; GAA = Goals against average

Player	Team	GP	MINS	W	L	OTL	SOL	GA	SO	Sv%	GAA
Austin Elliott	London Knights	33	1997	32	1	0	0	70	3	0.924	2.10
Jackson Parsons	Kitchener Rangers	52	3082	37	12	3	0	115	5	0.920	2.24
Aleksei Medvedev	London Knights	34	1954	22	8	2	0	91	3	0.915	2.79
Jacob Oster	Oshawa Generals	53	3181	32	17	3	1	149	3	0.904	2.81
Mike McIvor	North Bay Battalion	45	2557	22	17	3	0	122	3	0.910	2.86

=== Connor McDavid OHL Top Prospects Game ===
On October 30, the OHL announced a brand new one-game event, the Connor McDavid OHL Top Prospects Game. The top NHL entry draft eligible prospects participated in the game on January 15 at the Brantford Civic Centre in Brantford, Ontario in a matchup of the Eastern Conference against the Western Conference.

Jake O'Brien of the Brantford Bulldogs and Michael Misa of the Saginaw Spirit were named captains for their respective conferences.

Porter Martone of the Brampton Steelheads scored the overtime winning goal, as the Eastern Conference defeated the Western Conference 5-4 in front of a sold out crowd of 3,195 fans.

==== Top Prospects East vs. Top Prospects West ====
January 15	Top Prospects West	4 – 5	OT	Top Prospects East	Brantford Civic Centre	Recap
Luca Romano (1) - 4:44; Brady Martin (1) - pp - 10:12; Jack Nesbitt (1) - pp - 17:50		First period		7:28 - Shamar Moses (1); 13:19 - Lirim Amidovski (1)
Adrian Misaljevic (1) - 8:32		Second period		1:56 - Owen Griffin (1)
No scoring		Third period		4:07 - Xavier Vellaris (1)
No scoring		First overtime period		3:19 - Porter Martone (1)
Aleksei Medvedev (13 saves / 16 shots); Matthew Koprowski (0-1) (17 saves / 19 shots)		Goalie stats		David Egorov (14 saves / 18 shots); Jack Ivankovic (1-0) (19 saves / 19 shots)

=== Attendance ===
Team	Arena	Home Games	Avg. Attendance	Capacity	Cap. Percentage
London Knights	Canada Life Place	34	9,060	9,061	100.0%
Kitchener Rangers	Kitchener Memorial Auditorium	34	6,619	7,131	92.8%
Oshawa Generals	Tribute Communities Centre	34	5,591	5,180	107.9%
Windsor Spitfires	WFCU Centre	34	4,944	6,450	76.7%
Guelph Storm	Sleeman Centre	34	4,637	4,715	98.3%
Erie Otters	Erie Insurance Arena	34	4,258	6,716	63.4%
Saginaw Spirit	Dow Event Center	34	3,977	5,527	72.0%
Sault Ste. Marie Greyhounds	GFL Memorial Gardens	34	3,976	4,928	80.7%
Sarnia Sting	Progressive Auto Sales Arena	34	3,957	4,118	96.1%
Ottawa 67's	TD Place Arena	34	3,885	9,500	40.9%
Sudbury Wolves	Sudbury Community Arena	34	3,796	4,640	81.8%
Barrie Colts	Sadlon Arena	34	3,706	4,195	88.3%
Niagara IceDogs	Meridian Centre	34	3,603	5,300	68.0%
Kingston Frontenacs	Slush Puppie Place	34	3,497	5,614	62.3%
Peterborough Petes	Peterborough Memorial Centre	34	3,490	3,729	93.6%
Flint Firebirds	Dort Financial Center	34	3,185	4,365	73.0%
Brantford Bulldogs	Brantford Civic Centre	34	3,125	2,952	105.9%
North Bay Battalion	Boart Longyear Memorial Gardens	34	2,777	4,262	65.2%
Owen Sound Attack	Bayshore Community Centre	34	2,717	3,500	77.6%
Brampton Steelheads	CAA Centre	34	2,408	5,000	48.2%

== Playoffs ==
Conference quarterfinals	Conference semifinals
1	Brantford	4
8	North Bay	1
1	Brantford	2
4	Oshawa	4
2	Barrie	4
7	Niagara	1
Eastern Conference
3	Kingston	4
6	Sudbury	0
2	Barrie	4
3	Kingston	3
4	Oshawa	4
5	Brampton	2
1	London	4
8	Owen Sound	0
1	London	4
5	Erie	0
2	Windsor	4
7	S.S. Marie	1
Western Conference
3	Kitchener	4
6	Flint	1
2	Windsor	3
3	Kitchener	4
4	Saginaw	1
5	Erie	4

Conference finals
2	Barrie	0
4	Oshawa	4
1	London	4
3	Kitchener	0

Finals
E4	Oshawa	1
W1	London	4

=== Conference quarterfinals ===
==== Eastern conference quarterfinals ====
===== (1) Brantford Bulldogs vs. (8) North Bay Battalion =====
March 28	North Bay Battalion	3 – 6	Brantford Bulldogs	Brantford Civic Centre	Recap
No scoring		First period	2:34 - Nikolas Rossetto (1); 8:11 - pp - Lucas Moore (1); 10:58 - Calvin Crombie (1)
Lirim Amidovski (1) - 10:28; Nick Wellenreiter (1) - 17:25		Second period	12:34 - Patrick Thomas (1); 15:03 - pp - Jake O'Brien (1)
Jacob Therrien (1) - pp - 17:24		Third period	18:25 - en - Nick Lardis (1)
Mike McIvor (0-1, 29 saves / 34 shots)		Goalie stats	Ryerson Leenders (1-0, 30 saves / 33 shots)

March 30	North Bay Battalion	0 – 3	Brantford Bulldogs	Brantford Civic Centre	Recap
No scoring		First period	No scoring
No scoring		Second period	No scoring
No scoring		Third period	1:28 - pp - Jake O'Brien (2); 14:45 - Nick Lardis (2); 16:56 - en - Nick Lardis (3)
Mike McIvor (0-2, 25 saves / 27 shots)		Goalie stats	Ryerson Leenders (2-0, 21 saves / 21 shots)

April 1	Brantford Bulldogs	4 – 3	OT	North Bay Battalion	Boart Longyear Memorial Gardens	Recap
Noah Nelson (1) - 7:35		First period		No scoring
Marek Vanacker (1) - 18:34		Second period		4:37 - Jacob Therrien (2)
Luca Testa (1) - 3:17		Third period		4:34 - pp - Ethan Procyszyn (1); 9:45 - Lirim Amidovski (2)
Marek Vanacker (2) - 5:29		First overtime period		No scoring
Ryerson Leenders (3-0, 31 saves / 34 shots)		Goalie stats		Mike McIvor (0-3, 34 saves / 38 shots)

April 3	Brantford Bulldogs	3 – 6	North Bay Battalion	Boart Longyear Memorial Gardens	Recap
No scoring		First period	7:22 - Nolan Laird (1); 14:02 - Nick Wellenreiter (2)
Nick Lardis (4) - 0:15; Calvin Crombie (2) - 19:42		Second period	6:19 - pp - Jacob Therrien (3)
Luca Diplacido (1) - 7:31		Third period	2:17 - pp - Ethan Procyszyn (2); 9:21 - Ihnat Pazii (1); 17:39 - en - Jacob Therrien (4)
Ryerson Leenders (3-1, 27 saves / 32 shots)		Goalie stats	Mike McIvor (1-3, 44 saves / 47 shots)

April 5	North Bay Battalion	1 – 5	Brantford Bulldogs	Brantford Civic Centre	Recap
No scoring		First period	2:10 - pp - Nick Lardis (5)
Lirim Amidovski (3) - 7:18		Second period	4:30 - Nick Lardis (6); 11:06 - Owen Protz (1); 11:28 - Nick Lardis (7)
No scoring		Third period	5:07 - Calvin Crombie (3)
Mike McIvor (1-4, 29 saves / 34 shots)		Goalie stats	Ryerson Leenders (4-1, 23 saves / 24 shots)

Brantford wins series 4 – 1

===== (2) Barrie Colts vs. (7) Niagara IceDogs =====
March 27	Niagara IceDogs	2 – 4	Barrie Colts	Sadlon Arena	Recap
Kevin He (1) - pp - 19:23		First period	13:52 - Anthony Romani (1)
Alex Assadourian (1) - 8:16		Second period	4:27 - Cole Beaudoin (1); 16:53 - Anthony Romani (2)
No scoring		Third period	18:13 - Owen Van Steensel (1)
Owen Flores (0-1, 34 saves / 38 shots)		Goalie stats	Sam Hillebrandt (1-0, 27 saves / 29 shots)

March 31	Niagara IceDogs	5 – 7	Barrie Colts	Sadlon Arena	Recap
Matthew Virgilio (1) - 0:24		First period	7:12 - Grayson Tiller (1); 13:37 - Anthony Romani (3); 16:40 - pp - Anthony Romani (4)
No scoring		Second period	8:57 Beau Jelsma (1); 19:48 - pp - Emil Hemming (1)
Ivan Galiyanov (1) - pp - 1:50; Ivan Galiyanov (2) - 4:11; Mathieu Paris (1) - pp - 8:00; Andrei Loshko (1) - 13:06		Third period	18:50 - Anthony Romani (5); 19:54 - en - Beau Jelsma (2)
Finn Moffett (13 saves / 16 shots); Owen Flores (0-2, 32 saves / 35 shots)		Goalie stats	Sam Hillebrandt (2-0, 23 saves / 28 shots)

April 1	Barrie Colts	4 – 6	Niagara IceDogs	Meridian Centre	Recap
No scoring		First period	7:07 - Ryan Roobroeck (1)
Riley Patterson (1) - 1:04; Owen Van Steensel (2) - pp - 12:08; Emil Hemming (2) - 14:15		Second period	11:29 - Blake Arrowsmith (1); 14:46 - Alex Assadourian (2)
Anthony Romani (6) - 4:20		Third period	9:05 - pp - Kevin He (2); 12:25 - pp - Alex Assadourian (3); 19:32 - en - Kevin He (3)
Ben Hrebik (0-1, 27 saves / 32 shots)		Goalie stats	Owen Flores (1-2, 35 saves / 39 shots)

April 3	Barrie Colts	6 – 3	Niagara IceDogs	Meridian Centre	Recap
No scoring		First period	11:20 - pp - Andrei Loshko (2)
Carter Lowe (1) - 5:48; Owen Van Steensel (3) - pp - 11:23; Tristan Bertucci (1) - pp - 19:40		Second period	9:48 - Mathieu Paris (2); 16:23 - Alex Assadourian (4)
Anthony Romani (7) - 0:49; Beau Jelsma (3) - 2:00; Dalyn Wakely (1) - en - 18:49		Third period	No scoring
Sam Hillebrandt (3-0, 28 saves / 31 shots)		Goalie stats	Owen Flores (1-3, 40 saves / 45 shots)

April 5	Niagara IceDogs	3 – 6	Barrie Colts	Sadlon Arena	Recap
No scoring		First period	3:54 - Dalyn Wakely (2); 14:24 - Kashawn Aitcheson (1)
No scoring		Second period	8:42 - pp - Beau Jelsma (4); 14:18 - Cole Beaudoin (2); 17:38 - pp - Tristan Bertucci (2)
Ryan Roobroeck (2) - pp - 3:53; Ryan Roobroeck (3) - 7:23; Braidy Wassilyn (1) - 13:03		Third period	18:02 - en - Anthony Romani (8)
Owen Flores (1-4, 46 saves / 51 shots)		Goalie stats	Ben Hrebik (1-1, 31 saves / 34 shots)

Barrie wins series 4 – 1

===== (3) Kingston Frontenacs vs. (6) Sudbury Wolves =====
March 28	Sudbury Wolves	1 – 4	Kingston Frontenacs	Slush Puppie Place	Recap
No scoring		First period	5:48 - Cedrick Guindon (1); 9:28 - Vann Williamson (1)
No scoring		Second period	13:26 - Ethan Miedema (1)
Chase Coughlan (1) - pp - 10:34		Third period	18:40 - en - Cedrick Guindon (2)
Nate Krawchuk (0-1, 36 saves / 39 shots)		Goalie stats	Charlie Schenkel (1-0, 20 saves / 21 shots)

March 30	Sudbury Wolves	3 – 4	2OT	Kingston Frontenacs	Slush Puppie Place	Recap
Kieron Walton (1) - 8:58		First period		4:31 - Cedrick Guindon (3); 8:18 - Ben Pickell (1); 10:54 - pp - Cedrick Guindon (4)
No scoring		Second period		No scoring
Nathan Villeneuve (1) - 7:24; Nathan Villeneuve (2) - pp - 14:24		Third period		No scoring
No scoring		Second overtime period		2:50 - Gage Heyes (1)
Nate Krawchuk (0-2, 45 saves / 49 shots)		Goalie stats		Charlie Schenkel (2-0, 32 saves / 35 shots)

April 1	Kingston Frontenacs	4 – 2	Sudbury Wolves	Sudbury Community Arena	Recap
No scoring		First period	No scoring
Matthew Soto (1) - pp - 5:21; Cedrick Guindon (5) - 7:47; Maleek McGowan (1) - 12:18; Ben Pickell (2) - 15:14		Second period	11:21 - Donovan McCoy (1)
No scoring		Third period	18:06 - Quentin Musty (1)
Charlie Schenkel (3-0, 25 saves / 27 shots)		Goalie stats	Nate Krawchuk (0-3, 32 saves / 36 shots)

April 3	Kingston Frontenacs	3 – 2	Sudbury Wolves	Sudbury Community Arena	Recap
No scoring		First period	12:51 - Nathan Villeneuve (3)
Ben Pickell (3) - 1:30; Cal Uens (1) - 7:51		Second period	10:55 - pp - Nathan Villeneuve (4)
Jacob Battaglia (1) - 11:52		Third period	No scoring
Charlie Schenkel (4-0, 37 saves / 39 shots)		Goalie stats	Nate Krawchuk (0-4, 26 saves / 29 shots)

Kingston wins series 4 – 0

===== (4) Oshawa Generals vs. (5) Brampton Steelheads =====
March 28	Brampton Steelheads	4 – 7	Oshawa Generals	Tribute Communities Centre	Recap
Angus MacDonell (1) - 3:13		First period	1:14 - Colby Barlow (1); 7:14 - Colby Barlow (2); 10:27 - Ben Danford (1); 11:40 - Brooks Rogowski (1)
Angus MacDonell (2) - 16:09; Carson Rehkopf (1) - pp - 18:10		Second period	0:52 - pp - Colby Barlow (3); 4:02 - Beckett Sennecke (1)
Angus MacDonell (3) - pp - 18:54		Third period	2:16 - pp - Beckett Sennecke (2)
Jack Ivankovic (0-1, 10 saves / 16 shots); Brayden Gillespie (21 saves / 22 shots)		Goalie stats	Jacob Oster (1-0, 26 saves / 30 shots)

March 30	Brampton Steelheads	3 – 1	Oshawa Generals	Tribute Communities Centre	Recap
Luke Misa (1) - 19:11		First period	No scoring
Carson Rehkopf (2) - 16:15		Second period	No scoring
Porter Martone (1) - en - 19:32		Third period	17:33 - Colby Barlow (4)
Jack Ivankovic (1-1, 46 saves / 47 shots)		Goalie stats	Jacob Oster (1-1, 21 saves / 23 shots)

April 1	Oshawa Generals	7 – 5	Brampton Steelheads	CAA Centre	Recap
Luca Marrelli (1) - 18:52		First period	5:35 - Mason Zebeski (1); 7:17 - Gabriel Chiarot (1)
Owen Griffin (1) - 10:52; Brooks Rogowski (2) - 15:23		Second period	7:31 - pp - Carson Rehkopf (3)
Owen Griffin (2) - 2:05; Calum Ritchie (1) - 7:28; Owen Griffin (3) - 8:41; Matthew Buckley (1) - 12:54		Third period	11:19 - Mason Zebeski (2); 18:47 - Carson Rehkopf (4)
Jacob Oster (2-1, 23 saves / 28 shots)		Goalie stats	Jack Ivankovic (1-2, 35 saves / 42 shots)

April 3	Oshawa Generals	4 – 1	Brampton Steelheads	CAA Centre	Recap
Beckett Sennecke (3) - 17:31		First period	No scoring
Beckett Sennecke (4) - 1:39; Luke Torrance (1) - 19:23		Second period	12:57 - pp - Porter Martone (3)
Owen Griffin (4) - en - 17:06		Third period	No scoring
Jacob Oster (3-1, 32 saves / 33 shots)		Goalie stats	Jack Ivankovic (1-3, 27 saves / 30 shots)

April 4	Brampton Steelheads	6 – 3	Oshawa Generals	Tribute Communities Centre	Recap
Porter Martone (4) - pp - 5:56		First period	10:39 - pp - Andrew Gibson (1)
Luke Misa (2) - 14:35; Carson Rehkopf (5) - 18:41; Carson Rehkopf (6) - pp - 19:51		Second period	No scoring
Mason Zebeski (2) - en - 18:29; Konnor Smith (1) - en - 19:39		Third period
Jack Ivankovic (3 saves / 3 shots); Brayden Gillespie (1-0, 27 saves / 30 shots)		Goalie stats	Jacob Oster (3-2, 20 saves / 24 shots)

April 6	Oshawa Generals	4 – 1	Brampton Steelheads	CAA Centre	Recap
Colby Barlow (6) - 18:51		First period	No scoring
Luke Torrance (2) - 1:12; Owen Griffin (3) - pp - 17:18		Second period	No scoring
Owen Griffin (4) - en - 19:37		Third period	6:11 - Carson Rehkopf (7)
Jacob Oster (4-2, 23 saves / 24 shots)		Goalie stats	Brayden Gillespie (1-1, 30 saves / 33 shots)

Oshawa wins series 4 – 2

==== Western conference quarterfinals ====
===== (1) London Knights vs. (8) Owen Sound Attack =====
March 28	Owen Sound Attack	1 – 6	London Knights	Canada Life Place	Recap
No scoring		First period	7:02 - pp - Sam O'Reilly (1); 15:41 - Sam Dickinson (1); 19:33 - pp - Sam Dickinson (2)
Alec Leonard (1) - 9:20		Second period	19:58 - Denver Barkey (1)
No scoring		Third period	2:45 - Landon Sim (1); 3:58 - Kasper Halttunen (1)
Carter George (0-1, 36 saves / 42 shots)		Goalie stats	Austin Elliott (1-0, 24 saves / 25 shots)

March 30	Owen Sound Attack	3 – 6	London Knights	Canada Life Place	Recap
No scoring		First period	5:38 - Denver Barkey (2); 9:37 - Easton Cowan (1); 11:40 - pp - Landon Sim (2); 15:21 - Jared Woolley (1)
Pierce Mbuyi (1) - pp - 3:01; Bruce McDonald (1) - sh - 5:52; Tristan Delisle (1) - 12:21		Second period	No scoring
No scoring		Third period	16:47 - pp - Kasper Halttunen (2); 18:53 - en - Denver Barkey (3)
Carter George (0-2, 35 saves / 40 shots)		Goalie stats	Austin Elliott (2-0, 22 saves / 25 shots)

April 1	London Knights	7 – 4	Owen Sound Attack	Bayshore Community Centre	Recap
Sam Dickinson (3) - 19:17; Sam O'Reilly (2) - sh - 19:42		First period	3:21 - Ben Cormier (1)
Denver Barkey (4) - 4:06; Easton Cowan (2) - sh - 8:07		Second period	1:23 - pp - Landon Hookey (1); 13:48 - Tristan Delisle (2); 14:39 - Declan Waddick (1)
Sam O'Reilly (3) - 7:21; Jared Woolley (2) - 15:52; Easton Cowan (3) - en - 18:37		Third period	No scoring
Austin Elliott (3-0, 18 saves / 22 shots)		Goalie stats	Carter George (0-3, 32 saves / 38 shots)

April 3	London Knights	8 – 3	Owen Sound Attack	Bayshore Community Centre	Recap
Denver Barkey (5) - 6:36; Cam Allen (1) - 12:36		First period	12:22 - Masen Wray (1)
Kasper Halttunen (3) - 2:39; Noah Read (1) - 10:02; Easton Cowan (4) - 10:17; Sam Dickinson (3) - 12:52; Noah Read (2) - 19:08		Second period	18:13 - pp - Masen Wray (2)
Noah Read (3) - 14:26		Third period	1:38 - David Bedkowski (1); 17:42 - Masen Wray (3)
Austin Elliott (4-0, 15 saves / 19 shots)		Goalie stats	Carter George (0-4, 45 saves / 53 shots)

London wins series 4 – 0

===== (2) Windsor Spitfires vs. (7) Sault Ste. Marie Greyhounds =====
March 27	Sault Ste. Marie Greyhounds	2 – 7	Windsor Spitfires	WFCU Centre	Recap
No scoring		First period	2:08 - Carson Woodall (1); 3:34 - Cole Davis (1)
Travis Hayes (1) - 0:53; Owen Allard (1) - pp - 13:54		Second period	0:37 - Liam Greentree (1); 18:54 - pp - Noah Morneau (1)
No scoring		Third period	9:50 - Noah Morneau (2); 14:12 - en - Liam Greentree (2); 14:28 - Luke McNamara (1)
Nolan Lalonde (0-1, 30 saves / 36 shots)		Goalie stats	Joey Costanzo (1-0, 14 saves / 16 shots)

March 29	Sault Ste. Marie Greyhounds	1 – 7	Windsor Spitfires	WFCU Centre	Recap
Owen Allard (2) - pp - 10:16		First period	2:04 - pp - Noah Morneau (3); 2:44 - Carter Hicks (1)
No scoring		Second period	3:46 - Ethan Garden (1); 4:33 - Liam Greentree (3)
No scoring		Third period	5:28 - Noah Morneau (4); 9:37 - pp - Noah Morneau (5); 14:09 - sh - AJ Spellacy (1)
Nolan Lalonde (0-2, 22 saves / 28 shots); Landon Miller (5 saves / 6 shots)		Goalie stats	Joey Costanzo (2-0, 24 saves / 25 shots)

March 31	Windsor Spitfires	2 – 3	OT	Sault Ste. Marie Greyhounds	GFL Memorial Gardens	Recap
Carson Woodall (2) - 8:28		First period		No scoring
No scoring		Second period		4:22 - Justin Cloutier (1)
Liam Greentree (4) - 19:39		Third period		5:00 - pp - Travis Hayes (2)
No scoring		First overtime period		7:31 - Caeden Carlisle (1)
Joey Costanzo (2-1, 30 saves / 33 shots)		Goalie stats		Nolan Lalonde (1-2, 31 saves / 33 shots)

April 2	Windsor Spitfires	4 – 1	Sault Ste. Marie Greyhounds	GFL Memorial Gardens	Recap
Noah Morneau (6) - 15:25		First period	15:01 - Travis Hayes (3)
Ilya Protas (1) - 16:07; Noah Morneau (7) - pp - 18:40		Second period	No scoring
Ilya Protas (2) - en - 19:39		Third period	No scoring
Joey Costanzo (3-1, 23 saves / 24 shots)		Goalie stats	Nolan Lalonde (9 saves / 10 shots); Landon Miller (0-1, 12 saves / 14 shots)

April 4	Sault Ste. Marie Greyhounds	4 – 8	Windsor Spitfires	WFCU Centre	Recap
Carson Andrew (1) - sh - 11:54; Brady Martin (1) - pp - 19:59		First period	9:23 - Jack Nesbitt (1); 10:36 - pp - Liam Greentree (5); 11:35 - pp - Ryan Abraham (1); 13:14 - pp - Ilya Protas (3); 14:29 - pp - Noah Morneau (8); 18:23 - Liam Greentree (6)
Brady R. Smith (1) - 16:56		Second period	No scoring
Brady Martin (2) - pp - 7:46		Third period	15:51 - pp - Ryan Abraham (2); 19:26 - en - pp - Liam Greentree (7)
Landon Miller (0-2, 22 saves / 29 shots)		Goalie stats	Joey Costanzo (4-1, 28 saves / 32 shots)

Windsor wins series 4 – 1

===== (3) Kitchener Rangers vs. (6) Flint Firebirds =====
March 28	Flint Firebirds	3 – 4	OT	Kitchener Rangers	Kitchener Memorial Auditorium	Recap
Matthew Wang (1) - 14:47		First period		No scoring
Matthew Mania (1) - 13:24		Second period		9:40 - pp - Trent Swick (1); 10:57 - Andrew Vermeulen (1)
Nathan Aspinall (1) - 14:50		Third period		13:49 - Trent Swick (2)
No scoring		First overtime period		5:07 - Luca Romano (1)
Nathaniel Day (0-1, 29 saves / 33 shots)		Goalie stats		Jackson Parsons (1-0, 26 saves / 29 shots)

March 30	Flint Firebirds	1 – 6	Kitchener Rangers	Kitchener Memorial Auditorium	Recap
Nathan Aspinall (2) - 14:15		First period	11:19 - Jack Pridham (1); 11:58 - pp - Jack Pridham (2); 16:45 - Andrew Vermeulen (2)
No scoring		Second period	15:21 - Carson Campbell (1); 16:12 - Jakub Chromiak (1)
No scoring		Third period	16:41 - pp - Trent Swick (3)
Nathaniel Day (0-2, 37 saves / 43 shots)		Goalie stats	Jackson Parsons (2-0, 21 saves / 22 shots)

April 1	Kitchener Rangers	0 – 2	Flint Firebirds	Dort Financial Center	Recap
No scoring		First period	No scoring
No scoring		Second period	No scoring
No scoring		Third period	6:25 - Kaden Pitre (1); 7:43 - sh - Matthew Wang (2)
Jackson Parsons (2-1, 30 saves / 32 shots)		Goalie stats	Nathaniel Day (1-2, 38 saves / 38 shots)

April 3	Kitchener Rangers	5 – 1	Flint Firebirds	Dort Financial Center	Recap
No scoring		First period	No scoring
Jack Pridham (3) - 6:17; Tanner Lam (1) - 12:41		Second period	16:32 - Connor Clattenburg (1)
Trent Swick (4) - 3:54; Christian Humphreys (1) - pp - 12:55; Matthew Hlacar (1) - pp - 19:20		Third period	No scoring
Jackson Parsons (3-1, 23 saves / 24 shots)		Goalie stats	Nathaniel Day (1-3, 31 saves / 36 shots)

April 4	Flint Firebirds	1 – 2	Kitchener Rangers	Kitchener Memorial Auditorium	Recap
Alex Kostov (1) - 17:39		First period	6:09 - Tanner Lam (2)
No scoring		Second period	1:18 - Christian Humphreys (2)
No scoring		Third period	No scoring
Nathaniel Day (1-4, 21 saves / 23 shots)		Goalie stats	Jackson Parsons (4-1, 24 saves / 25 shots)

Kitchener wins series 4 – 1

===== (4) Saginaw Spirit vs. (5) Erie Otters =====
March 27	Erie Otters	8 – 5	Saginaw Spirit	Dow Event Center	Recap
No scoring		First period	No scoring
Pano Fimis (1) - 4:45; Dylan Edwards (1); Sam Alfano (1) - sh - 7:50; Callum Hughes (1) - 9:03; Malcolm Spence (1) - 9:45; Malcolm Spence (2) - 12:25; Martin Misiak (1) - 14:18; Pano Fimis (2) - sh - 18:22		Second period	16:33 - pp - Kristian Epperson (1); 19:06 - Liam Storch (1)
No scoring		Third period	2:49 - Calem Mangone (1); 18:28 - Hayden Barch (1); 19:24 - Ethan Weir (1)
Noah Erliden (1-0, 32 saves / 37 shots)		Goalie stats	Kaleb Papineau (0-1, 17 saves / 25 shots)

March 29	Erie Otters	9 – 5	Saginaw Spirit	Dow Event Center	Recap
Martin Misiak (2) - 13:21; Sam Alfano (2) - sh - 14:08		First period	2:49 - Igor Chernyshov (1); 16:23 - pp - Michael Misa (1)
Martin Misiak (3) - pp - 3:03; Dylan Edwards (2) - pp - 15:37		Second period	14:31 - Liam Storch (2)
Pano Fimis (3) - 0:30; Martin Misiak (4) - pp - 4:05; Pano Fimis (4) - 12:38; Dylan Edwards (3) - 15:20; Pano Fimis (5) - en - 16:37		Third period	3:37 - sh - Liam Storch (3); 7:17 - pp - Michael Misa (2)
Noah Erliden (2-0, 28 saves / 33 shots)		Goalie stats	Kaleb Papineau (0-2, 34 saves / 42 shots)

April 1	Saginaw Spirit	3 – 2	OT	Erie Otters	Erie Insurance Arena	Recap
No scoring		First period		9:58 - pp - Sam Alfano (3)
Zayne Parekh (1) - 13:22; Calem Mangone (2) - 15:28		Second period		No scoring
No scoring		Third period		19:47 - Malcolm Spence (3)
Zayne Parekh (2) - 14:07		First overtime period		No scoring
Kaleb Papineau (1-2, 39 saves / 41 shots)		Goalie stats		Noah Erliden (2-1, 25 saves / 28 shots)

April 3	Saginaw Spirit	3 – 7	Erie Otters	Erie Insurance Arena	Recap
Kristian Epperson (2) - 6:18		First period	14:58 - Gabriel Frasca (1)
Kristian Epperson (3) - 6:08; Carson Harmer (1) - 18:43		Second period	0:27 - Alexis Daviault (1); 8:48 - Sam Alfano (4)
No scoring		Third period	0:59 - Pano Fimis (6); 1:14 - Pano Fimis (7); 3:59 - pp - Dylan Edwards (4); 6:16 - Gabriel Frasca (2)
Kaleb Papineau (1-3, 29 saves / 36 shots)		Goalie stats	Noah Erliden (3-1, 31 saves / 34 shots)

April 5	Erie Otters	6 – 3	Saginaw Spirit	Dow Event Center	Recap
No scoring		First period	10:55 - pp - Igor Chernyshov (2); 12:00 - Carson Harmer (2)
Martin Misiak (5) - pp - 2:29; Dylan Edwards (5) - 5:20		Second period	12:19 - pp - Jacob Cloutier (1)
Martin Misiak (6) - pp - 7:20; Martin Misiak (7) - 12:53; Alex Messier (1) - 14:05; Sam Alfano (5) - en - 16:13		Third period	No scoring
Noah Erliden (4-1, 33 saves / 36 shots)		Goalie stats	Kaleb Papineau (1-4, 28 saves / 33 shots)

Erie wins series 4 – 1

=== Conference semifinals ===
==== Eastern conference semifinals ====
===== (1) Brantford Bulldogs vs. (4) Oshawa Generals =====
April 10	Oshawa Generals	2 – 5	Brantford Bulldogs	Brantford Civic Centre	Recap
Luca Marrelli (3) - 4:24; Owen Griffin (7) - 11:31		First period	No scoring
No scoring		Second period	5:39 - Thomas Budnick (1); 13:42 - Cole Brown (1); 15:31 - Luca Testa (2)
No scoring		Third period	7:47 - pp - Marek Vanacker (3); 19:56 - en - Nick Lardis (8)
Jacob Oster (4-3, 17 saves / 21 shots)		Goalie stats	Ryerson Leenders (19 saves / 21 shots); David Egorov (1-0, 22 saves / 22 shots)

April 13	Oshawa Generals	5 – 8	Brantford Bulldogs	Brantford Civic Centre	Recap
Calum Ritchie (2) - pp - 19:20		First period	6:06 - Marek Vanacker (4); 6:26 - Nick Lardis (9)
Owen Griffin (8) - 1:38; Matthew Buckley (2) - 9:36		Second period	3:04 - Adam Jiříček (1); 8:22 - Nick Lardis (10); 12:51 - pp - Nick Lardis (11)
Noah Powell (1) - 4:46; Owen Griffin (9) - 7:23		Third period	2:19 - Dylan Tsherna (1); 18:56 - en - Noah Nelson (2); 19:28 - en - Patrick Thomas (2)
Jacob Oster (4-4, 19 saves / 25 shots)		Goalie stats	David Egorov (2-0, 30 saves / 35 shots)

April 15	Brantford Bulldogs	2 – 7	Oshawa Generals	Tribute Communities Centre	Recap
Dylan Tsherna (2) - 14:26		First period	6:25 - pp - Calum Ritchie (3); 10:33 - Noah Powell (2); 10:49 - Ben Danford (2)
Patrick Thomas (3) - 3:57		Second period	14:23 - pp - Colby Barlow (7); 15:53 - Luca D'Amato (1)
No scoring		Third period	0:15 - sh - Calum Ritchie (4); 13:05 - Zackary Sandhu (1)
David Egorov (2-1, 34 saves / 41 shots)		Goalie stats	Jacob Oster (5-4, 19 saves / 21 shots)

April 17	Brantford Bulldogs	2 – 4	Oshawa Generals	Tribute Communities Centre	Recap
Marek Vanacker (5) - pp - 13:21		First period	No scoring
No scoring		Second period	6:35 - pp - Beckett Sennecke (5)
No scoring		Third period	14:43 - Matthew Buckley (3); 19:59 - en - Beckett Sennecke (6)
David Egorov (2-2, 25 saves / 28 shots)		Goalie stats	Jacob Oster (6-4, 24 saves / 26 shots)

April 19	Oshawa Generals	3 – 2	Brantford Bulldogs	Brantford Civic Centre	Recap
No scoring		First period	18:54 - Jake O'Brien (3)
Beckett Sennecke (7) - pp - 0:24; Beckett Sennecke (8) - pp - 8:37		Second period	11:54 - pp - Cole Brown (2)
Andrew Gibson (2) - 4:08		Third period	No scoring
Jacob Oster (7-4, 32 saves / 34 shots)		Goalie stats	Ryerson Leenders (4-2, 28 saves / 31 shots)

April 20	Brantford Bulldogs	1 – 4	Oshawa Generals	Tribute Communities Centre	Recap
No scoring		First period	4:35 - pp - Luca Marrelli (4); 15:45 - Colby Barlow (9)
Marek Vanacker (6) - 2:02		Second period	1:30 - Owen Griffin (10)
No scoring		Third period	19:51 - en - Owen Griffin (11)
Ryerson Leenders (4-3, 25 saves / 28 shots)		Goalie stats	Jacob Oster (8-4, 21 saves / 22 shots)

Oshawa wins series 4 – 2

===== (2) Barrie Colts vs. (3) Kingston Frontenacs =====
April 10	Kingston Frontenacs	2 – 6	Barrie Colts	Sadlon Arena	Recap
Maleek McGowan (2) - 5:01; Tuomas Uronen (1) - 7:09		First period	12:13 - Riley Patterson (2); 14:26 - pp - Emil Hemming (3)
No scoring		Second period	9:09 - Carter Lowe (2)
No scoring		Third period	1:30 - Dalyn Wakely (3); 14:11 - Beau Jelsma (5); 16:17 - pp - Kashawn Aitcheson (2)
Charlie Schenkel (4-1, 25 saves / 31 shots)		Goalie stats	Sam Hillebrandt (4-0, 38 saves / 40 shots)

April 12	Kingston Frontenacs	4 – 7	Barrie Colts	Sadlon Arena	Recap
Cal Uens (2) - 6:08; Emil Pieniniemi (1) - 13:43		First period	9:45 - Emil Hemming (4); 11:35 - Anthony Romani (9)
Cedrick Guindon (6) - 1:57; Tuomas Uronen (2) - 5:24		Second period	1:05 - pp - Riley Patterson (3); 3:06 - Riley Patterson (4); 9:52 - Grayson Tiller (2); 11:20 - Brad Gardiner (1)
No scoring		Third period	18:57 - en - Cole Beaudoin (3)
Charlie Schenkel (10 saves / 14 shots); Mason Vaccari (0-1, 14 saves / 16 shots)		Goalie stats	Sam Hillebrandt (5-0, 39 saves / 43 shots)

April 15	Barrie Colts	3 – 5	Kingston Frontenacs	Slush Puppie Place	Recap
Owen Van Steensel (4) - 8:18; Owen Van Steensel (5) - 16:09		First period	1:30 - Cedrick Guindon (7)
No scoring		Second period	17:50 - pp - Cedrick Guindon (8)
Carter Lowe (3) - 19:00		Third period	6:36 - Emil Pieniniemi (2); 10:51 - Gage Heyes (2); 19:35 - en - Ben Pickell (4)
Ben Hrebik (1-2, 38 saves / 42 shots)		Goalie stats	Charlie Schenkel (5-1, 22 saves / 25 shots)

April 17	Barrie Colts	4 – 9	Kingston Frontenacs	Slush Puppie Place	Recap
Emil Hemming (6) - 9:44		First period	17:11 - Tuomas Uronen (3)
Dalyn Wakely (4) - 16:05		Second period	1:08 - Quinton Burns (1); 1:40 - Tuomas Uronen (4); 3:38 - Joey Willis (1); 13:42 - Tuomas Uronen (5); 18:05 - pp - Cedrick Guindon (9)
Beau Jelsma (6) - pp - 8:30; Dalyn Wakely (5) - pp - 16:01		Third period	15:09 - Gage Heyes (3); 16:26 - Cal Uens (3); 17:38 - Matthew Soto (2)
Sam Hillebrandt (15 saves / 19 shots); Ben Hrebik (1-3, 23 saves / 28 shots)		Goalie stats	Charlie Schenkel (6-1, 16 saves / 20 shots)

April 19	Kingston Frontenacs	1 – 2	OT	Barrie Colts	Sadlon Arena	Recap
Cedrick Guindon (10) - 16:32		First period		No scoring
No scoring		Second period		8:20 - Dalyn Wakely (6)
No scoring		Third period		No scoring
No scoring		First overtime period		9:57 - Kashawn Aitcheson (3)
Charlie Schenkel (6-2, 42 saves / 44 shots)		Goalie stats		Sam Hillebrandt (6-0, 27 saves / 28 shots)

April 20	Barrie Colts	2 – 3	OT	Kingston Frontenacs	Slush Puppie Place	Recap
Emil Hemming (7) - 17:56		First period		13:45 - pp - Jacob Battaglia (2)
Tristan Bertucci (3) - pp - 11:16		Second period		No scoring
No scoring		Third period		3:46 - pp - Jacob Battaglia (3)
No scoring		First overtime period		2:53 - Gage Heyes (4)
Sam Hillebrandt (8 saves / 9 shots); Ben Hrebik (1-4, 26 saves / 28 shots)		Goalie stats		Charlie Schenkel (7-2, 27 saves / 29 shots)

April 22	Kingston Frontenacs	4 – 6	Barrie Colts	Sadlon Arena	Recap
Emil Pieniniemi (3) - 1:51; Cal Uens (4) - 15:21; Emil Pieniniemi (4) - pp - 15:46		First period	3:44 - Kashawn Aitcheson (4); 10:47 - pp - Emil Hemming (8)
No scoring		Second period	2:19 - pp - Owen Van Steensel (6); 6:55 - Tristan Bertucci (4)
Kieren Dervin (1) - 16:09		Third period	1:58 - pp - Kashawn Aitcheson (5); 19:47 - en - Beau Jelsma (7)
Charlie Schenkel (7-3, 40 saves / 45 shots)		Goalie stats	Sam Hillebrandt (7-0, 24 saves / 28 shots)

Barrie wins series 4 – 3

==== Western conference semifinals ====
===== (1) London Knights vs. (5) Erie Otters =====
April 10	Erie Otters	3 – 6	London Knights	Canada Life Place	Recap
Pano Fimis (8) - pp - 18:03		First period	18:37 - Cam Allen (2)
Dylan Edwards (6) - 16:47; Wesley Royston (1) - 16:59		Second period	7:09 - Denver Barkey (6); 9:21 - Oliver Bonk (1); 16:30 - pp - Landon Sim (4)
No scoring		Third period	0:53 - pp - Denver Barkey (7); 19:01 - en - Denver Barkey (8)
Noah Erliden (4-2, 30 saves / 35 shots)		Goalie stats	Austin Elliott (5-0, 24 saves / 27 shots)

April 12	Erie Otters	2 – 7	London Knights	Canada Life Place	Recap
Sam Alfano (6) - pp - 5:57		First period	9:27 - William Nicholl (1); 14:32 - Denver Barkey (9); 17:34 - Blake Montgomery (1)
Gabriel Frasca (3) - pp - 17:02		Second period	13:15 - Landon Sim (5); 19:50 - Easton Cowan (5)
No scoring		Third period	1:08 - Easton Cowan (6); 12:12 - Henry Brzustewicz (1)
Noah Erliden (4-3, 22 saves / 26 shots); Charlie Burns (13 saves / 16 shots)		Goalie stats	Austin Elliott (6-0, 22 saves / 24 shots)

April 15	London Knights	4 – 0	Erie Otters	Erie Insurance Arena	Recap
Easton Cowan (7) - 19:13; Landon Sim (6) - 19:27; Jacob Julien (1) - 19:44		First period	No scoring
Kasper Halttunen (4) - pp - 11:29		Second period	No scoring
No scoring		Third period	No scoring
Austin Elliott (7-0, 23 saves / 23 shots)		Goalie stats	Charlie Burns (0-1, 35 saves / 39 shots)

April 17	London Knights	4 – 3	OT	Erie Otters	Erie Insurance Arena	Recap
Easton Cowan (8) - 6:58		First period		18:47 - Pano Fimis (9)
Sam Dickinson (4) - pp - 13:30; Sam O'Reilly (4) - pp - 17:28		Second period		3:35 - Ty Henry (1)
No scoring		Third period		2:56 - Malcolm Spence (4)
Sam O'Reilly (5) - 6:49		First overtime period		No scoring
Austin Elliott (8-0, 25 saves / 28 shots)		Goalie stats		Charlie Burns (0-2, 46 saves / 50 shots)

London wins series 4 – 0

===== (2) Windsor Spitfires vs. (3) Kitchener Rangers =====
April 10	Kitchener Rangers	1 – 5	Windsor Spitfires	WFCU Centre	Recap
No scoring		First period	No scoring
No scoring		Second period	2:31 - Andrew Robinson (1); 7:13 - Anthony Cristoforo (1); 16:28 - pp - Liam Greentree (8)
Tanner Lam (3) - pp - 17:47		Third period	3:09 - Noah Morneau (9); 14:36 - pp - Noah Morneau (10)
Jackson Parsons (4-2, 17 saves / 22 shots)		Goalie stats	Joey Costanzo (5-1, 18 saves / 19 shots)

April 12	Kitchener Rangers	1 – 5	Windsor Spitfires	WFCU Centre	Recap
No scoring		First period	5:06 - Ryan Abraham (3); 14:53 - Conor Walton (1); 16:44 - pp - Noah Morneau (11)
Luca Romano (2) - sh - 18:32		Second period	9:29 - Ryan Abraham (4)
No scoring		Third period	1:17 - pp - Liam Greentree (9)
Jackson Parsons (4-3, 22 saves / 27 shots)		Goalie stats	Joey Costanzo (6-1, 18 saves / 19 shots)

April 14	Windsor Spitfires	6 – 3	Kitchener Rangers	Kitchener Memorial Auditorium	Recap
Liam Greentree (10) - pp - 13:37; Liam Greentree (11) - 16:59		First period	No scoring
Liam Greentree (12) - 4:57; Ilya Protas (4) - 13:51		Second period	3:24 - Luke Ellinas (1); 5:52 - Cameron Mercer (1)
Liam Greentree (13) - pp - 1:32; Liam Greentree (14) - en - 18:42		Third period	5:03 - Tanner Lam (4)
Joey Costanzo (7-1, 28 saves / 31 shots)		Goalie stats	Jackson Parsons (4-4, 19 saves / 24 shots)

April 16	Windsor Spitfires	0 – 3	Kitchener Rangers	Kitchener Memorial Auditorium	Recap
No scoring		First period	No scoring
No scoring		Second period	1:54 - Luke Ellinas (2); 13:31 - Luke Ellinas (3)
No scoring		Third period	16:46 - en - Luke Ellinas (4)
Joey Costanzo (7-2, 32 saves / 34 shots)		Goalie stats	Jackson Parsons (5-4, 24 saves / 24 shots)

April 18	Kitchener Rangers	5 – 2	Windsor Spitfires	WFCU Centre	Recap
Jack Pridham (4) - 5:28		First period	No scoring
Trent Swick (5) - 8:14; Christian Humphreys (3) - 13:02; Luca Romano (3) - 18:26		Second period	16:47 - Ilya Protas (5)
Trent Swick (6) - en - 19:02		Third period	5:14 - Josef Eichler (1)
Jackson Parsons (6-4, 21 saves / 23 shots)		Goalie stats	Joey Costanzo (7-3, 16 saves / 20 shots)

April 20	Windsor Spitfires	0 – 4	Kitchener Rangers	Kitchener Memorial Auditorium	Recap
No scoring		First period	No scoring
No scoring		Second period	7:22 - Cameron Mercer (2); 13:23 - ps - Jack Pridham (5)
No scoring		Third period	13:02 - Jack Pridham (6); 17:36 - Andrew Vermeulen (3)
Joey Costanzo (7-4, 27 saves / 31 shots)		Goalie stats	Jackson Parsons (7-4, 29 saves / 29 shots)

April 22	Kitchener Rangers	2 – 1	OT	Windsor Spitfires	WFCU Centre	Recap
Luke Ellinas (5) - 12:20		First period		No scoring
No scoring		Second period		11:20 - Carter Hicks (2)
No scoring		Third period		No scoring
Luke Ellinas (6) - 14:28		First overtime period		No scoring
Jackson Parsons (8-4, 39 saves / 40 shots)		Goalie stats		Joey Costanzo (7-5, 30 saves / 32 shots)

Kitchener wins series 4 – 3

=== Conference finals ===
==== Eastern conference finals ====
===== (2) Barrie Colts vs. (4) Oshawa Generals =====
April 25	Oshawa Generals	3 – 1	Barrie Colts	Sadlon Arena	Recap
No scoring		First period	No scoring
Owen Griffin (12) - 15:22; Matthew Buckley (4) - pp - 18:43		Second period	No scoring
Calum Ritchie (5) - en - 18:52		Third period	10:12 - Anthony Romani (10)
Jacob Oster (9-4, 27 saves / 28 shots)		Goalie stats	Sam Hillebrandt (7-1, 36 saves / 38 shots)

April 27	Oshawa Generals	7 – 1	Barrie Colts	Sadlon Arena	Recap
Beckett Sennecke (9) - 0:24; Andrew Gibson (3) - 16:19		First period	No scoring
Beckett Sennecke (10) - pp - 6:40; Colby Barlow (10) - pp - 9:05; Beckett Sennecke (11) - 17:40		Second period	No scoring
Luca Marrelli (5) - pp - 0:47; Andrew Gibson (4) - pp - 15:10		Third period	18:11 - pp - Owen Van Steensel (7)
Jacob Oster (10-4, 31 saves / 32 shots)		Goalie stats	Sam Hillebrandt (7-2, 25 saves / 30 shots); Ben Hrebik (9 saves / 11 shots)

April 29	Barrie Colts	6 – 7	2OT	Oshawa Generals	Tribute Communities Centre	Recap
Riley Paterson (5) - 2:20; Anthony Romani (11) - 7:03		First period		4:35 - Colby Barlow (11); 12:14 - pp - Colby Barlow (12); 18:19 - Brooks Rogowski (3)
Cole Beaudoin (3) - 6:00; Owen Van Steensel (8) - 19:43		Second period		18:29 - Beckett Sennecke (12); 19:24 - Noah Powell (3)
Kashawn Aitcheson (6) - 9:15; Riley Paterson (6) - 13:27		Third period		18:53 - Owen Griffin (13)
No scoring		Second overtime period		8:44 - Luke Torrance (3)
Sam Hillebrandt (7-3, 43 saves / 50 shots)		Goalie stats		Jacob Oster (11-4, 34 saves / 40 shots)

May 1	Barrie Colts	4 – 8	Oshawa Generals	Tribute Communities Centre	Recap
Cole Beaudoin (4) - 13:35		First period	No scoring
Anthony Romani (12) - 12:20; Brad Gardiner (2) - 12:53		Second period	4:00 - Luca D'Amato (2); 10:42 - Noah Powell (4); 15:33 - Owen Griffin (14)
Dalyn Wakely (7) - 13:54		Third period	3:40 - Matthew Buckley (5); 4:48 - pp - Colby Barlow (13); 5:13 - Luca Marrelli (6); 14:41 - Owen Griffin (15); 17:45 - Calum Ritchie (6)
Ben Hrebik (1-5, 22 saves / 30 shots)		Goalie stats	Jacob Oster (12-4, 27 saves / 31 shots)

Oshawa wins series 4 – 0

==== Western conference finals ====
===== (1) London Knights vs. (3) Kitchener Rangers =====
April 25	Kitchener Rangers	2 – 5	London Knights	Canada Life Place	Recap
No scoring		First period	2:08 - Landon Sim (7); 3:15 - Sam Dickinson (5); 6:23 - pp - Kasper Halttunen (5); 19:49 - Sam Dickinson (6)
Luca Romano (4) - 18:20		Second period	16:51 - Blake Montgomery (2)
Luca Romano (5) - 10:24		Third period	No scoring
Jackson Parsons (8-5, 36 saves / 41 shots)		Goalie stats	Austin Elliott (9-0, 22 saves / 24 shots)

April 27	Kitchener Rangers	2 – 6	London Knights	Canada Life Place	Recap
No scoring		First period	4:11 - Jesse Nurmi (1); 16:15 - Cam Allen (3)
Trent Swick (7) - 1:10; Luca Romano (6) - pp - 6:08		Second period	15:49 - Oliver Bonk (2); 17:26 - Jacob Julien (2)
No scoring		Third period	4:53 - Blake Montgomery (3); 10:22 - pp - Jacob Julien (3)
Jackson Parsons (8-6, 35 saves / 41 shots)		Goalie stats	Austin Elliott (10-0, 23 saves / 25 shots)

April 28	London Knights	3 – 2	Kitchener Rangers	Kitchener Memorial Auditorium	Recap
Landon Sim (8) - 7:33; Jacob Julien (4) - pp - 16:20		First period	9:39 - Luke Ellinas (7)
Landon Sim (9) - 10:47		Second period	1:58 - pp - Cameron Arquette (1)
No scoring		Third period	No scoring
Austin Elliott (11-0, 21 saves / 23 shots)		Goalie stats	Jackson Parsons (8-7, 34 saves / 37 shots)

April 30	London Knights	4 – 2	Kitchener Rangers	Kitchener Memorial Auditorium	Recap
Noah Read (4) - 3:12; Sam Dickinson (7) - pp - 11:38		First period	2:16 - pp - Luke Ellinas (8)
Kasper Halttunen (6) - pp - 13:21		Second period	No scoring
Jesse Nurmi (2) - 11:58		Third period	17:02 - Jack Pridham (7)
Austin Elliott (12-0, 25 saves / 27 shots)		Goalie stats	Jackson Parsons (8-8, 32 saves / 36 shots)

London wins series 4 – 0

=== J. Ross Robertson Cup finals ===
==== (W1) London Knights vs. (E4) Oshawa Generals ====
May 8	Oshawa Generals	4 – 2	London Knights	Canada Life Place	Recap
No scoring		First period	No scoring
Andrew Gibson (5) - pp - 10:08		Second period	4:05 - Rene Van Bommel (1); 18:57 - pp - Kasper Halttunen (7)
Andrew Gibson (6) - pp - 8:18; Calum Ritchie (7) - pp - 16:35; Matthew Buckley (6) - en - 19:13		Third period	No scoring
Jacob Oster (13-4, 30 saves / 32 shots)		Goalie stats	Austin Elliott (12-1, 22 saves / 25 shots)

May 10	Oshawa Generals	2 – 5	London Knights	Canada Life Place	Recap
Calum Ritchie (8) - pp - 9:16		First period	16:37 - Easton Cowan (9)
Luke Torrance (4) - 10:21		Second period	5:28 - Sam O'Reilly (6); 8:36 - Oliver Bonk (2); 18:11 - Jacob Julien (5)
No scoring		Third period	18:21 - en - Easton Cowan (10)
Jacob Oster (13-5, 25 saves / 29 shots)		Goalie stats	Austin Elliott (13-1, 31 saves / 33 shots)

May 12	London Knights	7 – 5	Oshawa Generals	Tribute Communities Centre	Recap
Easton Cowan (11) - 7:59; Kasper Halttunen (8) - 11:14		First period	No scoring
Kasper Halttunen (9) - 0:56; Jacob Julien (6) - sh - 10:23; Kasper Halttunen (10) - 16:09		Second period	3:21 - pp - Owen Griffin (16)
Jesse Nurmi (3) - 17:49; 19:04 - en - Easton Cowan (12)		Third period	8:09 - Luca D'Amato (3); 11:10 - Colby Barlow (14); 13:42 - Luke Torrance (5); 18:31 - Beckett Sennecke (13)
Austin Elliott (14-1, 31 saves / 36 shots)		Goalie stats	Jacob Oster (13-6, 20 saves / 26 shots); Isaac Gravelle (0 saves / 0 shots)

May 13	London Knights	6 – 2	Oshawa Generals	Tribute Communities Centre	Recap
No scoring		First period	No scoring
Sam Dickinson (8) - 6:27; Kasper Halttunen (11) - 10:18; Sam Dickinson (9) - 13:11; Landon Sim (11) - 13:53; Kasper Halttunen (12) - pp - 19:02		Second period	13:22 - Andrew Gibson (7)
Kasper Halttunen (13) - pp - 9:37		Third period	0:41 - Calum Ritchie (9)
Austin Elliott (15-1, 23 saves / 25 shots)		Goalie stats	Jacob Oster (13-7, 24 saves / 29 shots); Isaac Gravelle (9 saves / 10 shots)

May 15	Oshawa Generals	2 – 5	London Knights	Canada Life Place	Recap
Andrew Gibson (8) - 6:57		First period	19:39 - Kasper Halttunen (14)
Beckett Sennecke (14) - 19:35		Second period	5:43 - Sam O'Reilly (7); 13:05 - Kasper Halttunen (15)
No scoring		Third period	15:18 - Landon Sim (12); 16:18 - en - Easton Cowan (13)
Jacob Oster (13-8, 20 saves / 24 shots)		Goalie stats	Austin Elliott (16-1, 32 saves / 34 shots)

London wins series 4 – 1

=== J. Ross Robertson Cup Champions Roster ===
2024-25 London Knights
Goaltenders: (Canada) 31 – Austin Elliott; (Russia) 78 – Aleksei Medvedev	Defencemen: (United States) 2 – Henry Brzustewicz; (Canada) 3 – Sam Dickinson; (Canada) 4 – Andoni Fimis; (Canada) 17 – Cam Allen; (Canada) 49 – Liam Spencer; (Canada) 51 – Jared Woolley; (Canada) 59 – Oliver Bonk; (Canada) 67 – P.J. Fagan II	Wingers: (Canada) 7 – Easton Cowan; (United States) 11 – Ryder Boulton; (Finland) 12 – Kasper Halttunen; (Canada) 14 – Evan Van Gorp; (Finland) 44 – Jesse Nurmi; (United States) 47 – Blake Montgomery; (Canada) 74 – Noah Aboflan; (Canada) 86 – Denver Barkey; (Canada) 90 – Landon Sim; (Canada) 92 – Noah Read	Centres: (Canada) 13 – Jacob Julien; (Canada) 23 – Sam O'Reilly; (Canada) 26 – Logan Hawery; (Canada) 55 – Rene Van Bommel; (Canada) 73 – William Nicholl; Coach: (Canada) Dale Hunter; General Manager: (Canada) Mark Hunter

=== Playoff scoring leaders ===
Note: GP = Games played; G = Goals; A = Assists; Pts = Points; PIM = Penalty minutes

Player	Team	GP	G	A	Pts	PIM
Easton Cowan	London Knights	17	13	26	39	16
Luca Marrelli	Oshawa Generals	21	6	30	36	9
Colby Barlow	Oshawa Generals	21	14	19	33	6
Beckett Sennecke	Oshawa Generals	18	14	18	32	32
Sam Dickinson	London Knights	17	9	22	31	2
Owen Griffin	Oshawa Generals	21	16	13	29	9
Calum Ritchie	Oshawa Generals	21	9	16	25	22
Ilya Protas	Windsor Spitfires	12	5	20	25	6
Liam Greentree	Windsor Spitfires	11	14	10	24	6
Anthony Romani	Barrie Colts	16	12	12	24	2
Dalyn Wakely	Barrie Colts	16	7	17	24	20

=== Playoff leading goaltenders ===
Note: GP = Games played; Mins = Minutes played; W = Wins; L = Losses; GA = Goals Allowed; SO = Shutouts; GAA = Goals against average

Player	Team	GP	MINS	W	L	GA	SO	Sv%	GAA
Joey Costanzo	Windsor Spitfires	12	735	7	5	28	0	0.911	2.29
Austin Elliott	London Knights	17	1025	16	1	42	1	0.906	2.46
Ryerson Leenders	Brantford Bulldogs	8	442	4	3	20	1	0.911	2.71
Jackson Parsons	Kitchener Rangers	16	969	8	8	44	2	0.908	2.72
Charlie Schenkel	Kingston Frontenacs	11	658	7	3	34	0	0.897	3.10

== Awards ==
Playoffs trophies
Trophy name	Recipient	Ref
J. Ross Robertson Cup; OHL Finals champion	London Knights	
Bobby Orr Trophy; Eastern Conference playoff champion	Oshawa Generals	
Wayne Gretzky Trophy; Western Conference playoff champion	London Knights	
Wayne Gretzky 99 Award; Playoffs MVP	Kasper Halttunen (London Knights)	
Regular season — Team trophies
Trophy name	Recipient	Ref
Hamilton Spectator Trophy; Team with best record	London Knights	
Leyden Trophy; East division champion	Brantford Bulldogs	
Emms Trophy; Central division champion	Barrie Colts	
Bumbacco Trophy; West division champion	Windsor Spitfires	
Holody Trophy; Midwest division champion	London Knights	
Regular season — Executive awards
Trophy name	Recipient	Ref
Matt Leyden Trophy; Coach of the year	Jussi Ahokas (Kitchener Rangers)	
Jim Gregory Award; General manager of the year	Kory Cooper (Kingston Frontenacs)	
OHL Executive of the Year; Executive of the Year	–	
Regular season — Player awards
Trophy name	Recipient	Ref
Red Tilson Trophy; Most outstanding player	Michael Misa (Saginaw Spirit)	
Eddie Powers Memorial Trophy; Top scorer	Michael Misa (Saginaw Spirit)	
Dave Pinkney Trophy; Lowest team goals against	Austin Elliott & Aleksei Medvedev (London Knights)	
Max Kaminsky Trophy; Most outstanding defenceman	Sam Dickinson (London Knights)	
Jim Mahon Memorial Trophy; Top scoring right winger	Nick Lardis (Brantford Bulldogs)	
Emms Family Award; Rookie of the year	Pierce Mbuyi (Owen Sound Attack)	
William Hanley Trophy; Most sportsmanlike player	Ilya Protas (Windsor Spitfires)	
F. W. "Dinty" Moore Trophy; Best rookie GAA	Aleksei Medvedev (London Knights)	
Bobby Smith Trophy; Scholastic player of the year	Michael Misa (Saginaw Spirit)	
Leo Lalonde Memorial Trophy; Overage player of the year	Jackson Parsons (Kitchener Rangers)	
Jim Rutherford Trophy; Goaltender of the year	Jackson Parsons (Kitchener Rangers)	
Dan Snyder Memorial Trophy; Humanitarian of the year	Denver Barkey (London Knights)	
Roger Neilson Memorial Award; Top academic college/university player	Thomas Budnick (Brantford Bulldogs)	
Ivan Tennant Memorial Award; Top academic high school player	Kaden Sienko (Saginaw Spirit)	
Mickey Renaud Captain's Trophy; Team captain that best exemplifies character and commitment	Liam Greentree (Windsor Spitfires)	
Prospect player awards
Trophy name	Recipient	Ref
Jack Ferguson Award; First overall pick in priority selection	Kaden McGregor (Peterborough Petes)	
Tim Adams Memorial Trophy; OHL Cup MVP	Camryn Warren (Toronto Jr. Canadiens)	

== All-Star teams ==
The OHL All-Star and All-Rookie Teams were selected by the OHL's general managers.

=== First team ===
- Michael Misa, Centre, Saginaw Spirit
- Liam Greentree, Left Wing, Windsor Spitfires
- Nick Lardis, Right Wing, Brantford Bulldogs
- Sam Dickinson, Defence, London Knights
- Zayne Parekh, Defence, Saginaw Spirit
- Jackson Parsons, Goaltender, Kitchener Rangers
- Jussi Ahokas, Coach, Kitchener Rangers

=== Second team ===
- Ilya Protas, Centre, Windsor Spitfires
- Denver Barkey, Left Wing, London Knights
- Easton Cowan, Right Wing, London Knights
- Kashawn Aitcheson, Defence, Barrie Colts
- Oliver Bonk, Defence, London Knights
- Carter George, Goaltender, Owen Sound Attack
- Dale Hunter, Coach, London Knights

=== Third team ===
- Calum Ritchie, Centre, Oshawa Generals
- Jacob Battaglia, Left Wing, Kingston Frontenacs
- Beckett Sennecke, Right Wing, Oshawa Generals
- Luca Marelli, Defence, Oshawa Generals
- Ben Danford, Defence, Oshawa Generals
- Austin Elliott, Goaltender, London Knights
- Jay McKee, Coach, Brantford Bulldogs

=== First All-Rookie team ===
- Lev Katzin, Centre, Guelph Storm
- Pierce Mbuyi, Left Wing, Owen Sound Attack
- Dimian Zhilkin, Right Wing, Saginaw Spirit
- Chase Reid, Defence, Sault Ste. Marie Greyhounds
- Kohyn Eshkawkogan, Defence, Ottawa 67's
- Aleksei Medvedev, Goaltender, London Knights

=== Second All-Rookie team ===
- Beckham Edwards, Centre, Sarnia Sting
- Ethan Belchetz, Left Wing, Windsor Spitfires
- Jacob Cloutier, Right Wing, Saginaw Spirit
- Carter Hicks, Defence, Windsor Spitfires
- Simon Wang, Defence, Oshawa Generals
- Colin Ellsworth, Goaltender, Guelph Storm

== 2025 OHL Priority Selection ==
On March 26, 2025, the league announced the results of the Ontario Hockey League Priory Selection Lottery. Each of the four non-playoff participated in the lottery, as the 20th place Peterborough Petes had a 40% chance of winning, the 19th place Guelph Storm had a 30% chance of winning, the 18th place Sarnia Sting had a 20% chance of winning, and the 17th place Ottawa 67's had a 10% chance of winning. The Peterborough Petes won the lottery and selected Kaden McGregor from the Ottawa Valley Titans with the first overall selection.

The entirety of the OHL Priority Selection Draft will take place over two days, as rounds 1-3 take place on April 11, while rounds 4-15 will be on April 12.

#	Player	Nationality	OHL Team	Hometown	Minor Team
1	Kaden McGregor	Canada	Peterborough Petes	Renfrew, Ontario	Ottawa Valley Titans
2	Jaakko Wycisk	Canada	Guelph Storm	Tecumseh, Ontario	Sun County Panthers
3	Brock Chitaroni	Canada	Ottawa 67's	Marathon, Ontario	Barrie Jr. Colts
4	Brenner Lammens	Canada	Sarnia Sting	Langton, Ontario	Toronto Jr. Red Wings
5	Max Delisle	Canada	Owen Sound Attack	St. Andrews West, Ontario	Toronto Titans
6	Camryn Warren	Canada	North Bay Battalion	Maple, Ontario	Toronto Jr. Canadiens
7	Noah Laus	Canada	Sault Ste. Marie Greyhounds	Woodbridge, Ontario	Toronto Jr. Canadiens
8	Charlie Murata	Canada	Flint Firebirds	Scarborough, Ontario	Don Mills Flyers
9	Aleks Kulemin	Canada	Kingston Frontenacs	Toronto, Ontario	Don Mills Flyers
10	Ryerson Edgar	Canada	Niagara IceDogs	Holland Landing, Ontario	York-Simcoe Express
11	Brayden Bennett	Canada	Sudbury Wolves	Ottawa, Ontario	Toronto Titans
12	Jake Murray	Canada	Erie Otters	Meaford, Ontario	Huron-Perth Lakers
13	Ryan Hanrahan	Canada	Saginaw Spirit	Concord, Ontario	Mississauga Reps
14	Peter Green	Canada	Brampton Steelheads	Toronto, Ontario	Don Mills Flyers
15	Keaton Ardagh	Canada	Brampton Steelheads	Clarington, Ontario	Toronto Jr. Canadiens
16	Sam Roberts	Canada	Oshawa Generals	Aurora, Ontario	Toronto Jr. Canadiens
17	Matthew Henderson	Canada	Kingston Frontenacs	Sarnia, Ontario	Huron-Perth Lakers
18	Alexander Sementsov	Russia	Barrie Colts	St. Petersburg, Russia	Halton Hurricanes
19	Ryan Kaczynski	United States	Sault Ste. Marie Greyhounds	Syosset, New York	Mid Fairfield Jr. Rangers
20	David Buchman	Canada	Brantford Bulldogs	Stittsville, Ontario	Ottawa Valley Titans
21	John McLaughlin	Canada	Windsor Spitfires	Corunna, Ontario	Lambton Jr. Sting
22	Kane Barch	United States	Kitchener Rangers	Plano, Texas	Huron-Perth Lakers
23	Alex Campeau	Canada	London Knights	Cornwall, Ontario	Eastern Ontario Wild

== 2025 CHL Import Draft ==
On July 2, 2025, the Canadian Hockey League conducted the 2025 CHL Import Draft, in which teams in all three CHL leagues participate in. The Brantford Bulldogs held the first pick in the draft by a team in the OHL. The Bulldogs selected Adam Benák from Czech Republic with the OHL's first selection in the draft.

Below are the players who were selected in the first round by Ontario Hockey League teams in the 2025 CHL Import Draft.

#	Player	Nationality	OHL team	Hometown	Last team
2	Adam Benák (C)	Czech Republic	Brantford Bulldogs	Plzeň, Czech Republic	Youngstown Phantoms (USHL)
5	Darels Uļjanskis (LD)	Latvia	Flint Firebirds	Riga, Latvia	AIK IF (J20 Nationell)
8	Ondřej Ruml (LD)	Czech Republic	Ottawa 67's	Boskovice, Czech Republic	HC Dynamo Pardubice (Czech U20 Extraliga)
11	Šimon Katolický (LW)	Czech Republic	Sarnia Sting	Havlíčkův Brod, Czech Republic	Tappara Tampere (U18 SM-sarja)
14	Matouš Kucharčík (C)	Czech Republic	Owen Sound Attack	Prague, Czech Republic	HC Slavia Praha (Czech U20 Extraliga)
17	Evgeny Dubrovtsev (C)	Russia	North Bay Battalion	Saint Petersburg, Russia	SKA-1946 (MHL)
20	Domán Kristóf Szongoth (C)	Hungary	Sault Ste. Marie Greyhounds	Budapest, Hungary	KooKoo (U20 SM-sarja)
23	Yevgeni Prokhorov (G)	Belarus	Flint Firebirds	Lida, Belarus	Dinamo-Shinnik Bobruysk (MHL)
26	Ben Stefan Reisnecker (RD)	Czech Republic	Niagara IceDogs	Plzeň, Czech Republic	HC Slavia Praha (Czech U20 Extraliga)
29	Artyom Gonchar (LD)	Russia	Sudbury Wolves	Chelyabinsk, Russia	Stalnye Lisy (MHL)
32	Alex Misiak (RW)	Slovakia	Ottawa 67's	Malinovo, Slovakia	Waterloo Black Hawks (USHL)
35	Nikita Klepov (LW)	Russia	Sudbury Wolves	Deerfield Beach, Florida	Sioux City Musketeers (USHL)
38	Matej Stankoven (LW)	Slovakia	Brampton Steelheads	Bratislava, Slovakia	HC Slovan Bratislava (Czech U20 Extraliga)
41	Onni Kalto (RW)	Finland	Oshawa Generals	Helsinki, Finland	HC TPS (U20 SM-sarja)
44	Christian Kirsch (G)	Switzerland	Kitchener Rangers	Basel, Switzerland	Janesville Jets (NAHL)
47	Andrei Gudin (LW)	Russia	Barrie Colts	Yekaterinburg, Russia	Ohio AAA Blue Jackets (Tier 1 Elite Hockey League)
50	Vladimír Dravecký (RD)	Czech Republic	Brantford Bulldogs	Manchester, New Hampshire	Rögle BK (J20 Nationell)
53	Michal Svrcek (LW)	Slovakia	Windsor Spitfires	Žilina, Slovakia	Brynäs IF (J20 Nationell)
56	Oscar Hemming (LW)	Finland	Kitchener Rangers	Vaasa, Finland	Kiekko-Espoo (U18 SM-sarja)
58	Linus Funck (RD)	Sweden	London Knights	Luleå, Sweden	Luleå HF (J20 Nationell)

== 2025 NHL entry draft ==
On June 27–28, 2025, the National Hockey League conducted the 2025 NHL entry draft at the Peacock Theatre in Los Angeles, California. Matthew Schaefer of the Erie Otters was the highest player from the OHL to be selected, as he was taken with the 1st overall pick by the New York Islanders. A total of 41 OHL players were selected in the draft.

Below are the players selected from OHL teams at the NHL Entry Draft.

Round	#	Player	Nationality	NHL team	Hometown	OHL team
1	1	Matthew Schaefer (LD)	Canada	New York Islanders	Stoney Creek, Ontario	Erie Otters
1	2	Michael Misa (C)	Canada	San Jose Sharks	Oakville, Ontario	Saginaw Spirit
1	5	Brady Martin (C)	Canada	Nashville Predators	Elmira, Ontario	Sault Ste. Marie Greyhounds
1	6	Porter Martone (RW)	Canada	Philadelphia Flyers	Peterborough, Ontario	Brampton Steelheads
1	8	Jake O'Brien (C)	Canada	Seattle Kraken	Toronto, Ontario	Brantford Bulldogs
1	12	Jack Nesbitt (C)	Canada	Philadelphia Flyers	Sarnia, Ontario	Windsor Spitfires
1	17	Kashawn Aitcheson (LD)	Canada	New York Islanders	Toronto, Ontario	Barrie Colts
1	21	Cameron Reid (LD)	Canada	Nashville Predators	Aylmer, Ontario	Kitchener Rangers
1	31	Henry Brzustewicz (RD)	United States	Los Angeles Kings	Washington, Michigan	London Knights
2	33	Haoxi Wang (LD)	China	San Jose Sharks	Beijing, China	Oshawa Generals
2	43	Malcolm Spence (LW)	Canada	New York Rangers	Mississauga, Ontario	Erie Otters
2	47	Alexei Medvedev (G)	Russia	Vancouver Canucks	St. Petersburg, Russia	London Knights
2	56	Ethan Czata (C)	Canada	New York Rangers	Brampton, Ontario	Niagara IceDogs
2	58	Jack Ivankovic (G)	Canada	Nashville Predators	Mississauga, Ontario	Brampton Steelheads
3	65	Kieren Dervin (C)	Canada	Vancouver Canucks	Gloucester, Ontario	Kingston Frontenacs
3	71	David Bedkowski (RD)	Canada	Buffalo Sabres	Toronto, Ontario	Owen Sound Attack
3	72	Noah Read (C)	Canada	Anaheim Ducks	St. Catharines, Ontario	London Knights
3	74	Luca Romano (C)	Canada	New York Islanders	Toronto, Ontario	Kitchener Rangers
3	86	Tyler Hopkins (C)	Canada	Toronto Maple Leafs	Campbellville, Ontario	Kingston Frontenacs
3	88	Kristian Epperson (LW)	United States	Los Angeles Kings	Mequon, Wisconsin	Saginaw Spirit
4	99	Trenten Bennett (G)	Canada	New Jersey Devils	Kitchener, Ontario	Owen Sound Attack
4	105	Travis Hayes (RW)	United States	Pittsburgh Penguins	Westland, Michigan	Sault Ste. Marie Greyhounds
4	107	Parker Holmes (LW)	Canada	Chicago Blackhawks	South Mountain, Ontario	Brantford Bulldogs
4	121	Lirim Amidovski (RW)	Canada	Minnesota Wild	Alliston, Ontario	North Bay Battalion
4	125	Jimmy Lombardi (C)	Canada	Los Angeles Kings	Toronto, Ontario	Flint Firebirds
5	129	Shamar Moses (RW)	Canada	Florida Panthers	Toronto, Ontario	North Bay Battalion
5	148	Quinn Beauchesne (RD)	Canada	Pittsburgh Penguins	Ottawa, Ontario	Guelph Storm
5	153	Harry Nansi (RW)	Canada	Toronto Maple Leafs	Nepean, Ontario	Owen Sound Attack
5	154	Jordan Charron (RW)	Canada	Pittsburgh Penguins	Ayr, Ontario	Sault Ste. Marie Greyhounds
5	160	Owen Griffin (RW)	Canada	Columbus Blue Jackets	Markham, Ontario	Oshawa Generals
6	171	Evan Passmore (RD)	Canada	New York Rangers	Elmira, Ontario	Barrie Colts
6	175	Gabriel Chiarot (RW)	Canada	Vancouver Canucks	Hamilton, Ontario	Brampton Steelheads
6	176	Aidan Lane (RW)	Canada	Calgary Flames	Mississauga, Ontario	Brampton Steelheads
6	185	Ryan Fellinger (RD)	Canada	Toronto Maple Leafs	Wawa, Ontario	Flint Firebirds
6	189	Andrew MacNiel (RD)	Canada	Montreal Canadiens	Cobourg, Ontario	Kitchener Rangers
7	212	Grant Spada (LD)	Canada	Tampa Bay Lightning	Fort Erie, Ontario	Guelph Storm
7	215	Marco Mignosa (RW)	Canada	Tampa Bay Lightning	Vaughan, Ontario	Sault Ste. Marie Greyhounds
7	217	Matthew Hlacar (LW)	Canada	Toronto Maple Leafs	Binbrook, Ontario	Kitchener Rangers
7	220	Jacob Cloutier (RW)	Canada	Winnipeg Jets	Ottawa, Ontario	Saginaw Spirit
7	221	Filip Ekberg (LW)	Sweden	Carolina Hurricanes	Uppsala, Sweden	Ottawa 67's
7	222	Charlie Paquette (RW)	Canada	Dallas Stars	Essex, Ontario	Guelph Storm

== Sources ==
- "EDITORIAL: Changes to NCAA, junior hockey will have lasting impact". Rocky Mountain Outlook. Great West Media. December 2, 2024.

Preceded by 2023–24 OHL season	OHL seasons	Succeeded by 2025–26 OHL season
