= Hunter Brzustewicz =

American ice hockey player (born 2004)

- Born: November 29, 2004 (age 21) Washington, Michigan, U.S.
- Height: 6 ft 0 in (183 cm)
- Weight: 190 lb (86 kg; 13 st 8 lb)
- Position: Defense
- Shoots: Right
- NHL team (P) Cur. team: Calgary Flames; Calgary Wranglers (AHL)
- NHL draft: 75th overall, 2023; Vancouver Canucks
- Playing career: 2024–present

Hunter Brzustewicz (born November 29, 2004) is an American professional ice hockey player who is a defenseman for the Calgary Wranglers in the American Hockey League (AHL) as a prospect to the Calgary Flames of the National Hockey League (NHL). He was selected in the third round by the Vancouver Canucks in the 2023 NHL entry draft.

== Playing career ==
As a 15-year-old, Brzustewicz achieved 111 points in 66 games for the Oakland Jr. Grizzlies, capturing the record for most points by a defenceman in that league. Brzustewicz saw his ice time limited playing two seasons for the US National Team Development Program. He was drafted in the fourth round by the Barrie Colts in 2020 but was traded to the Kitchener Rangers in exchange for Declan McDonnell. Brzustewicz committed to play for the University of Michigan at the age of 13, but de-committed when the Rangers showed interest. In the first month of the 2023 OHL season, Brzustewicz lead the league with 16 points in 7 games, which saw him playing on the Rangers’ top pairing and running the first unit power play. His 46 points in 28 games and plus-20 differential had some speculating he was a "draft steal", comparing his season to that of Ryan Ellis and Brandt Clarke. Brzustewicz became the first OHL defenceman to lead the league in scoring at the halfway point of a season since Bryan Fogarty in 1988.

On January 31, 2024, Brzustewicz was traded to the Calgary Flames, along with Andrei Kuzmenko, the Canucks’ 1st round pick in 2024, a conditional fourth round pick and Joni Jurmo in exchange for Elias Lindholm. He was later signed to a three-year, entry-level contract with the Flames on March 14, 2024.

== Personal life ==
Brzustewicz has two older sisters, Hannah and Hailey, and a younger brother, Henry. Henry is an ice hockey player for the London Knights and was drafted by 31st overall by the Los Angeles Kings in the 2025 NHL entry draft.

== Career statistics ==
=== Regular season and playoffs ===
			Regular season					Playoffs
Season	Team	League	GP	G	A	Pts	PIM	GP	G	A	Pts	PIM
2021–22	U.S. National Development Team	USHL	25	0	9	9	0	—	—	—	—	—
2022–23	Kitchener Rangers	OHL	68	6	51	57	12	9	0	4	4	0
2023–24	Kitchener Rangers	OHL	67	13	79	92	24	10	1	8	9	12
2024–25	Calgary Wranglers	AHL	70	5	27	32	14	1	0	0	0	0
2024–25	Calgary Flames	NHL	1	0	0	0	2	—	—	—	—	—
2025–26	Calgary Wranglers	AHL	34	4	9	13	8	—	—	—	—	—
2025–26	Calgary Flames	NHL	34	2	5	7	4	—	—	—	—	—
NHL totals			35	2	5	7	6	—	—	—	—	—

=== International ===
Year	Team	Event	Result	GP	G	A	Pts	PIM
2021	United States	HG18	5th	4	0	3	3	0
2022	United States	U18	2nd place, silver medalist(s)	5	0	2	2	2
Junior totals				9	0	5	5	2

== Awards and honors ==
Award	Year
OHL
Second All-Star Team	2024
