= Henry Brzustewicz =

American ice hockey player (born 2007)

- Born: February 9, 2007 (age 19) Washington, Michigan, U.S.
- Height: 6 ft 2 in (188 cm)
- Weight: 205 lb (93 kg; 14 st 9 lb)
- Position: Defense
- Shoots: Right
- NHL team (P) Cur. team: Los Angeles Kings; Ontario Reign (AHL)
- NHL draft: 31st overall, 2025; Los Angeles Kings
- Playing career: 2026–present

Henry Brzustewicz (born February 9, 2007) is an American professional ice hockey defenceman for the Ontario Reign of the American Hockey League (AHL) while under contract as a prospect to the Los Angeles Kings of the National Hockey League (NHL). He was drafted 31st overall by the Kings in the 2025 NHL entry draft.

== Playing career ==
During the 2023–24 season, Brzustewicz recorded two goals and four assists in 52 regular season games. During the playoffs he recorded two goals and one assist in 16 games to help the Knights win the J. Ross Robertson Cup. During the 2024–25 season, he recorded ten goals and 32 assists in 67 regular season games. During the playoffs he recorded one goal and four assists in 17 games to help the Knights win their second consecutive J. Ross Robertson Cup.

On June 27, 2025, Brzustewicz was drafted 31st overall by the Los Angeles Kings in the 2025 NHL entry draft. At the completion of his third season with the London Knights in 2025–26, having recorded 19 goals and 35 assists for a team-best 54 points in 59 games, Brzustewicz was then signed by the Kings to a three-year, entry-level contract on April 5, 2026.

== Personal life ==
Brzustewicz's older brother, Hunter, is a professional ice hockey player for the Calgary Flames of the National Hockey League (NHL).

== Career statistics ==
			Regular season					Playoffs
Season	Team	League	GP	G	A	Pts	PIM	GP	G	A	Pts	PIM
2023–24	London Knights	OHL	52	2	4	6	20	16	2	1	3	0
2024–25	London Knights	OHL	67	10	32	42	77	17	1	4	5	17
2025–26	London Knights	OHL	59	19	35	54	57	5	0	2	2	20
2025–26	Ontario Reign	AHL	5	0	0	0	8	5	0	0	0	0
AHL totals			5	0	0	0	8	5	0	0	0	0

Awards and achievements
Preceded by Liam Greentree	Los Angeles Kings first-round draft pick 2025	Succeeded by Elton Hermansson
