= Haoxi Wang =

Chinese ice hockey player (born 2007)

- Born: July 27, 2007 (age 19) Beijing, China
- Height: 6 ft 6 in (198 cm)
- Weight: 215 lb (98 kg; 15 st 5 lb)
- Position: Defence
- Shoots: Left
- OHL team: Niagara IceDogs
- National team: China
- NHL draft: 33rd overall, 2025; San Jose Sharks

Haoxi Wang (Chinese: 王浩西; pinyin: Wáng Hàoxī; born July 27, 2007), also known as Simon Wang, is a Chinese ice hockey player who is a defenceman for the Niagara IceDogs of the Ontario Hockey League (OHL). He was drafted 33rd overall by the San Jose Sharks in the 2025 NHL entry draft, making him the highest-ever drafted Chinese-born player.

== Early life ==
Wang was born in Beijing, China. He attended an international kindergarten, where he learned basic English and was given the name "Simon" by his teacher.

Wang started playing hockey when he was four years old, being introduced to the sport, itself minor in China by a friend who played. In the summer of 2015, when he was eight years old, China increased its investment in winter sports in preparation for the 2022 Winter Olympics in Beijing. With support from the Chinese government, Wang's mother rented a facility, built an ice rink, and hired a hockey coach and a figure skating coach. She also opened two youth sports clubs—the Beijing Capitals Minor Hockey Club and the Beijing Miracle Figure Skating Club—also with governmental support. Through these opportunities, Wang began skating 3–4 times per week. Speaking in 2024 about his youth training, Wang said, "Looking back on it I feel like I wasn't playing hockey, I was just there on the rink skating around."

When he was 12 years old, Wang moved to Canada to further his hockey development. He lived with the family of Zev Zekun Zhang, a fellow young Chinese hockey player. He attended Everest Academy and played for the AAA Toronto Titans of the Greater Toronto Hockey League (GTHL). With the cancellation of the GTHL season due to the COVID-19 pandemic, Wang returned to Beijing where he continued to play hockey. He returned to Canada at age 14, attending St. Andrew's College and joining the AAA North York Rangers of the GTHL.

== Playing career ==
He played in the Ontario Junior Hockey League (OJHL) for multiple teams, including the King Rebellion – a club owned by his mother Willa Wang.

In February 2024, Wang played for the Chinese U-18 national team. In a 2024 interview, he stated that he takes pride in his background and would like to play for the national junior team and the men's national team.

In December 2024, he transitioned to major junior hockey, joining the Oshawa Generals of the Ontario Hockey League (OHL). He recorded two assists in 32 games during the regular season and added three more assists during a 21-game playoff run that saw Oshawa reach the OHL finals.

Although he had previously committed to Boston University, Wang opted to remain in major junior hockey and returned to Oshawa for the 2025–26 season. In the 2025 NHL entry draft, he was selected 33rd overall by the San Jose Sharks. Wang was the third Chinese-born player selected in an NHL entry draft, following Andong Song (selected in 2015) and Kevin He (selected in 2024).

== International play ==
On April 29, 2026, Wang was selected to the China national team for the 2026 IIHF Division I B Championship. He was named the Best Defender of the tournament, finishing with two goals, two assists and a +4 in five games as China finished as the tournament runners-up.

== Career statistics ==
=== Regular season and playoffs ===
			Regular season					Playoffs
Season	Team	League	GP	G	A	Pts	PIM	GP	G	A	Pts	PIM
2022–23	North York Rangers	OJHL	4	0	0	0	0	—	—	—	—	—
2023–24	Brantford 99ers	OJHL	28	0	7	7	22	4	1	0	1	0
2024–25	King Rebellion	OJHL	38	4	18	22	73	—	—	—	—	—
2024–25	Oshawa Generals	OHL	32	0	2	2	19	21	0	3	3	8
2025–26	Oshawa Generals	OHL	28	2	11	13	22	—	—	—	—	—
2025–26	Niagara IceDogs	OHL	29	4	9	13	34	5	0	3	3	4
OHL totals			89	6	22	28	75	26	0	6	6	12

== Awards and honours ==
Award	Year
OHL
OHL Second All-Rookie Team	2024–25
