= 2025–26 OHL season =

- League: Ontario Hockey League
- Sport: Hockey
- Duration: Preseason; August 29, 2025 – September 14, 2025; Regular season September 18, 2025 – March 22, 2026; Playoffs; March 26, 2026 – May 12, 2026
- Teams: 20
- TV partner(s): Rogers TV; YourTV; TSN; FloHockey

Draft
- Top draft pick: Kaden McGregor
- Picked by: Peterborough Petes

Regular season
- Hamilton Spectator Trophy: Brantford Bulldogs (2)
- Season MVP: Sam O'Reilly (London/Kitchener)
- Top scorer: Nikita Klepov (Saginaw Spirit)

Playoffs
- Playoffs MVP: Sam O'Reilly (Rangers)
- Finals champions: Kitchener Rangers (5)
- Runners-up: Barrie Colts

OHL seasons
- 2024–25 2026–27

2025–26 CHL season
- League: Canadian Hockey League
- Sport: Hockey
- Duration: OHL; September 2025 – May 2026; QMJHL; September 2025 – May 2026; WHL; September 2025 – May 2026
- Teams: 61
- TV partner(s): RDS; TSN; Rogers TV
- Season MVP: Maxim Massé (Chicoutimi Saguenéens) (QMJHL)
- Top scorer: Markus Ruck (Medicine Hat Tigers) (WHL)

Memorial Cup
- Finals champions: Kitchener Rangers (3rd title)
- Runners-up: Everett Silvertips

The 2025–26 OHL season was the 46th season of operation (45th season of play) of the Ontario Hockey League. The league played a 68-game regular season which began on September 18, 2025, and concluded on March 22, 2026. The post-season began on March 26, 2026, and concluded on May 12, 2026.

The Kitchener Rangers won the J. Ross Robertson Cup and represented the Ontario Hockey League at the 2026 Memorial Cup, which was hosted by the Kelowna Rockets of the Western Hockey League. The tournament was held at Prospera Place in Kelowna, British Columbia. The Rangers won the Memorial Cup, as they defeated the Everett Silvertips in the final game of the tournament.

== Off-season ==
=== Interleague schedule ===
On June 3, the OHL and the Quebec Maritimes Junior Hockey League announced four interleague games between the two leagues.

The Ottawa 67's hosted the Gatineau Olympiques on January 16 at TD Place Arena before making the trip to Gatineau, Quebec to face the Olympiques at Centre Slush Puppie on January 17. The 67's won both games, winning the first game 2–1 in Ottawa, followed by a 5–3 win in Gatineau.

The Sudbury Wolves hosted the Rouyn-Noranda Huskies at the Sudbury Community Arena on January 18. The two clubs played again in Rouyn-Noranda, Quebec a week later at Aréna Glencore on January 25. The Wolves won both games, winning the first game 5–3 in Sudbury, followed by a 4-3 overtime victory in Rouyn-Noranda.

=== Rivalry week ===
On June 13, the OHL announced its first ever OHL Rivalry Week, as it highlighted intense matchups in a four-day window from October 16 until October 19. The matchups featured a home-and-home between two familiar opponents.

The matchups included:

- Barrie Colts vs. North Bay Battalion
- Brampton Steelheads vs. Brantford Bulldogs
- Erie Otters vs. Niagara IceDogs
- Flint Firebirds vs. Saginaw Spirit
- Guelph Storm vs. Owen Sound Attack
- Kingston Frontenacs vs. Ottawa 67's
- Kitchener Rangers vs. London Knights
- Oshawa Generals vs. Peterborough Petes
- Sarnia Sting vs. Windsor Spitfires
- Sault Ste. Marie Greyhounds vs. Sudbury Wolves

=== Broadcasting rights ===
On August 26, the OHL and FloSports entered into a seven-year media partnership that establishes FloHockey as the global home for live and on-demand streaming coverage of the OHL. All regular season games, playoff rounds and other marquee events are included in the deal.

== Pre-season ==
On July 7, 2025, the OHL announced the preseason schedule for the 2025–26 season. In total, there was 50 preseason games which began on August 29 and concluded on September 14.

This years schedule had a pre-season showcase at the Kitchener Memorial Auditorium over Labour Day weekend that included the host team, the Kitchener Rangers, as well as the Brantford Bulldogs, Oshawa Generals and Saginaw Spirit.

Neutral site games include:

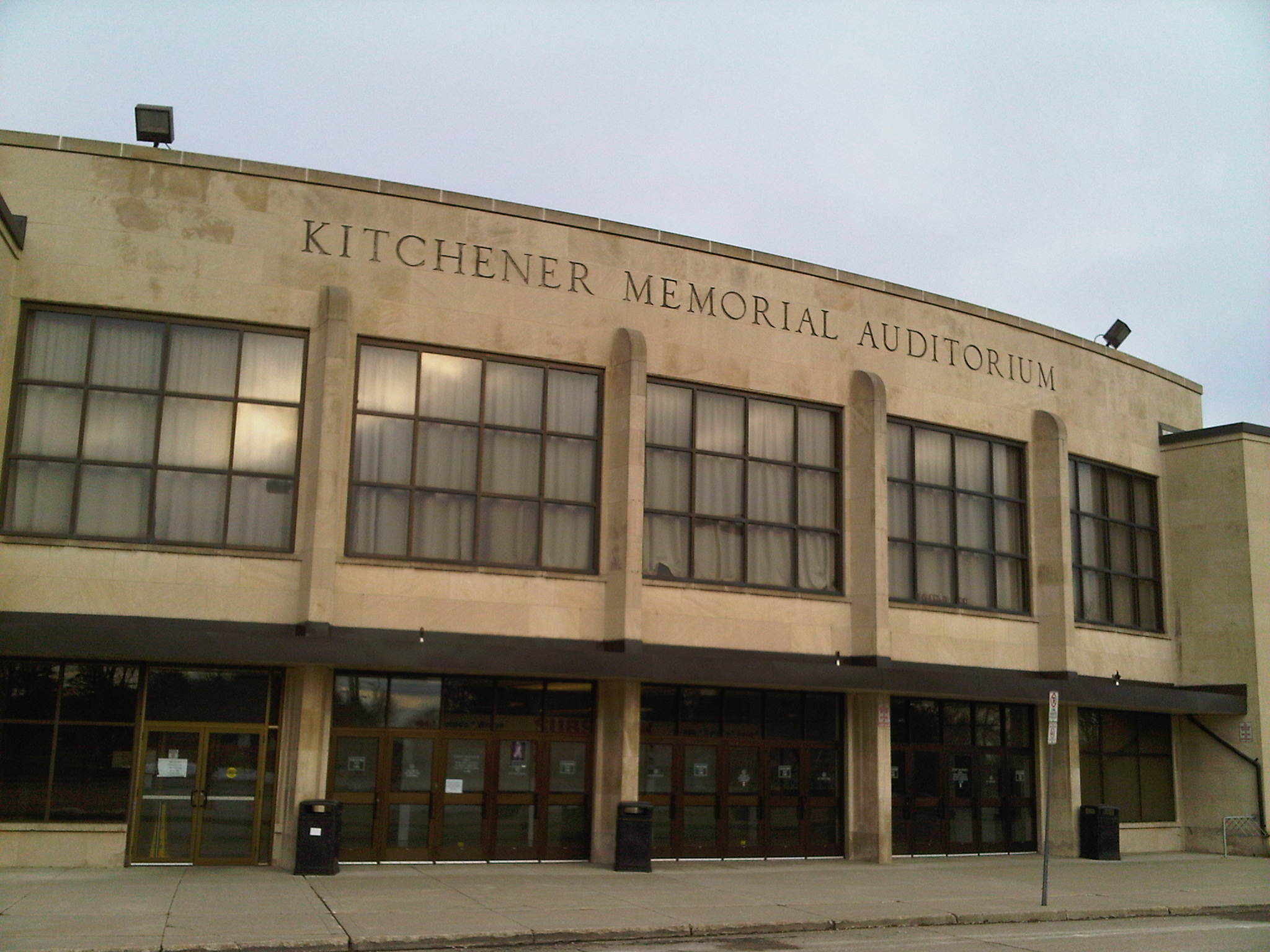
The Kitchener Memorial Auditorium hosted the pre-season showcase over Labour Day weekend.

- Oshawa Generals vs. Saginaw Spirit at the Kitchener Memorial Auditorium in Kitchener, Ontario on August 29.
- Saginaw Spirit vs. Brantford Bulldogs at the Kitchener Memorial Auditorium in Kitchener, Ontario on August 30.
- Erie Otters vs. Peterborough Petes at the Lindsay Recreation Complex in Lindsay, Ontario on August 30.
- North Bay Battalion vs. Owen Sound Attack at Eddie Bush Memorial Arena in Collingwood, Ontario on August 31.
- Erie Otters vs. Peterborough Petes at the Cavan Monaghan Community Centre in Millbrook, Ontario on August 31.
- Brantford Bulldogs vs. Guelph Storm at the North Dumfries Community Complex in Ayr, Ontario on September 1.
- Rouyn-Noranda Huskies vs. Sudbury Wolves at McIntyre Arena in Timmins, Ontario on September 3.
- Windsor Spitfires vs. Flint Firebirds at Flint Iceland Arena in Flint, Michigan on September 5.
- Kingston Frontenacs vs. Ottawa 67's at the North Grenville Municipal Centre in Kemptville, Ontario on September 5.
- North Bay Battalion vs. Sarnia Sting at the North Simcoe Sports & Recreation Centre in Midland, Ontario on September 5.
- London Knights vs. Erie Otters at the Western Fair Sports Centre in London, Ontario on September 6.
- Barrie Colts vs. Sarnia Sting at the North Simcoe Sports & Recreation Centre in Midland, Ontario on September 6.
- Barrie Colts vs. Owen Sound Attack at The Plex in Port Elgin, Ontario on September 7.
- Kingston Frontenacs vs. Peterborough Petes at the Asphodel-Norwood Community Centre in Norwood, Ontario on September 7.
- Windsor Spitfires vs. Saginaw Spirit at Chatham Memorial Arena in Chatham, Ontario on September 7.
- Sault Ste. Marie Greyhounds vs. Saginaw Spirit at Midland Civic Arena in Midland, Michigan on September 12.
- Flint Firebirds vs. Erie Otters at William Allman Memorial Arena in Stratford, Ontario on September 12.
- Kitchener Rangers vs. Windsor Spitfires at the Atlas Tube Recreation Centre in Lakeshore, Ontario on September 13.
- Flint Firebirds vs. Windsor Spitfires at Vollmer Arena in La Salle, Ontario on September 14.
- Kingston Frontenacs vs. Sudbury Wolves at Stouffville Arena in Stouffville, Ontario on September 14.

OHL training camps began in late August in preparation of the 2025–26 season, which started on September 18, 2025.

== Regular season ==
=== Final standings ===
Note: DIV = Division; GP = Games played; W = Wins; L = Losses; OTL = Overtime losses; SL = Shootout losses; GF = Goals for; GA = Goals against;
PTS = Points; x = clinched playoff berth; y = clinched division title; z = clinched conference title

==== Eastern conference ====
Rank	Team	DIV	GP	W	L	OTL	SOL	Pts	ROW	GF	GA
1	z-Brantford Bulldogs	East	68	48	10	8	2	106	46	296	190
2	y-Barrie Colts	Central	68	45	14	5	4	99	39	246	194
3	x-Ottawa 67's	East	68	47	15	3	3	100	44	265	160
4	x-Peterborough Petes	East	68	40	24	1	3	84	38	235	231
5	x-North Bay Battalion	Central	68	38	26	3	1	80	33	237	215
6	x-Kingston Frontenacs	East	68	33	30	3	2	71	31	212	209
7	x-Niagara IceDogs	Central	68	32	30	4	2	70	29	211	253
8	x-Sudbury Wolves	Central	68	27	39	2	0	56	25	211	262
9	Brampton Steelheads	Central	68	19	38	6	4	48	18	164	246
10	Oshawa Generals	East	68	19	45	3	1	42	19	177	273

==== Western conference ====
Rank	Team	DIV	GP	W	L	OTL	SOL	Pts	ROW	GF	GA
1	z-Kitchener Rangers	Midwest	68	47	14	5	2	101	46	261	179
2	y-Windsor Spitfires	West	68	44	15	6	3	97	41	264	173
3	x-Flint Firebirds	West	68	44	17	4	3	95	41	261	199
4	x-London Knights	Midwest	68	40	23	4	1	85	36	242	207
5	x-Sault Ste. Marie Greyhounds	West	68	39	23	1	5	84	34	251	204
6	x-Owen Sound Attack	Midwest	68	27	32	4	5	63	26	243	279
7	x-Guelph Storm	Midwest	68	28	35	2	3	61	26	225	263
8	x-Saginaw Spirit	West	68	26	34	4	4	60	24	228	292
9	Sarnia Sting	West	68	21	38	8	1	51	18	205	289
10	Erie Otters	Midwest	68	18	41	5	4	45	16	179	289

=== Scoring leaders ===
Note: GP = Games played; G = Goals; A = Assists; Pts = Points; PIM = Penalty minutes

Player	Team	GP	G	A	Pts	PIM
Nikita Klepov	Saginaw Spirit	67	37	60	97	43
Nathan Aspinall	Flint Firebirds	65	33	61	94	42
Jake O'Brien	Brantford Bulldogs	53	28	65	93	28
Egor Barabanov	Saginaw Spirit	68	28	63	91	79
Jack Pridham	Kitchener Rangers	65	46	44	90	54
Marco Mignosa	Sault Ste. Marie Greyhounds	65	35	54	89	33
Kieron Walton	Sudbury / Peterborough	62	40	48	88	26
Cole Beaudoin	Barrie Colts	54	33	55	88	29
Dylan Edwards	Erie / Kitchener	67	40	47	87	39
Christian Humphreys	Kitchener Rangers	63	27	58	85	33

=== Leading goaltenders ===
Note: GP = Games played; Mins = Minutes played; W = Wins; L = Losses: OTL = Overtime losses;
SL = Shootout losses; GA = Goals Allowed; SO = Shutouts; GAA = Goals against average

Player	Team	GP	MINS	W	L	OTL	SOL	GA	SO	Sv%	GAA
Ryder Fetterolf	Ottawa 67's	41	2,436	29	9	2	1	84	6	0.923	2.07
Joey Costanzo	Windsor Spitfires	50	2,829	32	11	4	1	102	4	0.908	2.16
Jaeden Nelson	Ottawa 67's	29	1,671	18	6	1	2	65	1	0.915	2.33
Sebastian Gatto	London Knights	38	2,075	24	8	2	0	82	3	0.916	2.37
Christian Kirsch	Kitchener Rangers	41	2,382	27	10	2	1	96	4	0.899	2.42

=== Connor McDavid OHL Top Prospects Game ===
On January 14, the top NHL entry draft eligible prospects participated in the Connor McDavid OHL Top Prospects Game at the Peterborough Memorial Centre in Peterborough, Ontario in a matchup of the Eastern Conference against the Western Conference.

Alessandro Di Iorio of the Sarnia Sting and Adam Novotný of the Peterborough Petes were named captains for their respective conferences.

Nikita Klepov of the Saginaw Spirit scored a goal and added two assists, leading the Western Conference to a 4-3 win in front of 3,697 fans.

==== Top Prospects East vs. Top Prospects West ====
January 14	Top Prospects West	4 – 3	Top Prospects East	Peterborough Memorial Centre	Recap
Egor Barabanov (1) - 8:50		First period	15:57 - pp - Ryder Cali (1)
Nikita Klepov (1) - 16:23		Second period	7:54 - Adam Novotný (1)
Rylan Singh (1) - 2:12; Layne Gallacher (1) - 14:42		Third period	17:25 - pp - Adam Novotný (2)
Zachary Jovanovski (19 saves / 21 shots); Stepan Shurygin (15 saves / 16 shots)		Goalie stats	Matthew Minchak (12 saves / 13 shots); Ryder Fetterolf (12 saves / 15 shots)

=== Attendance ===
Team	Arena	Home Games	Avg. Attendance	Capacity	Cap. Percentage
London Knights	Canada Life Place	34	9,051	9,061	99.9%
Kitchener Rangers	Kitchener Memorial Auditorium	34	6,762	7,131	94.8%
Oshawa Generals	Tribute Communities Centre	34	5,382	6,152	87.5%
Windsor Spitfires	WFCU Centre	34	5,178	6,450	80.3%
Guelph Storm	Sleeman Centre	34	4,555	4,715	96.6%
Erie Otters	Erie Insurance Arena	34	4,064	6,716	60.5%
Ottawa 67's	TD Place Arena	34	4,033	9,500	42.5%
Saginaw Spirit	Dow Event Center	34	3,881	5,527	70.2%
Sault Ste. Marie Greyhounds	GFL Memorial Gardens	34	3,848	4,928	78.1%
Barrie Colts	Sadlon Arena	34	3,581	4,195	85.4%
Peterborough Petes	Peterborough Memorial Centre	34	3,490	3,729	93.6%
Sarnia Sting	Progressive Auto Sales Arena	34	3,463	4,118	84.1%
Sudbury Wolves	Sudbury Community Arena	34	3,273	4,640	70.5%
Flint Firebirds	Dort Financial Center	34	3,223	4,365	73.8%
Kingston Frontenacs	Slush Puppie Place	34	3,222	5,614	57.4%
Niagara IceDogs	Meridian Centre	34	3,156	5,300	59.5%
Brantford Bulldogs	TD Civic Centre	34	3,151	2,952	106.8%
Owen Sound Attack	Bayshore Community Centre	34	2,719	3,500	77.7%
North Bay Battalion	Boart Longyear Memorial Gardens	34	2,645	4,262	62.1%
Brampton Steelheads	CAA Centre	34	2,238	5,000	44.8%

== Playoffs ==
Conference quarterfinals	Conference semifinals
1	Brantford	4
8	Sudbury	0
1	Brantford	4
5	North Bay	0
2	Barrie	4
7	Niagara	1
Eastern Conference
3	Ottawa	4
6	Kingston	0
2	Barrie	4
3	Ottawa	1
4	Peterborough	2
5	North Bay	4
1	Kitchener	4
8	Saginaw	0
1	Kitchener	4
5	Sault Ste. Marie	1
2	Windsor	4
7	Guelph	0
Western Conference
3	Flint	4
6	Owen Sound	0
2	Windsor	4
3	Flint	0
4	London	1
5	Sault Ste. Marie	4

Conference finals
1	Brantford	3
2	Barrie	4
1	Kitchener	4
2	Windsor	1

OHL Finals
E2	Barrie	0
W1	Kitchener	4

=== Conference quarterfinals ===
==== Eastern conference quarterfinals ====
===== (1) Brantford Bulldogs vs. (8) Sudbury Wolves =====
March 27	Sudbury Wolves	2 – 6	Brantford Bulldogs	TD Civic Centre	Recap
No scoring		First period	15:01 - pp - Cooper Dennis (1); 18:44 - Luca Testa (1)
Daniel Berehowsky (1) - pp - 10:39		Second period	3:58 - pp - Caleb Malhotra (1)
No scoring		Third period	11:18 - ps - Adam Benák (1); 16:12 - Caleb Malhotra (2); 17:36 - Luca Testa (2)
Paolo Frasca (0-1) (36 saves / 42 shots)		Goalie stats	Ryerson Leenders (1-0) (22 saves / 24 shots)

March 29	Sudbury Wolves	2 – 4	Brantford Bulldogs	TD Civic Centre	Recap
Jean-Cristoph Lemieux (1) - pp - 18:54		First period	4:46 - pp - Caleb Malhotra (3); 7:30 - Gabriel Frasca (1)
Jan Chovan (1) - pp - 13:37		Second period	15:08 - Philip Govedaris (1)
No scoring		Third period	19:41 - en - pp - Marek Vanacker (1)
Paolo Frasca (0-2) (23 saves / 26 shots)		Goalie stats	Ryerson Leenders (2-0) (26 saves / 28 shots)

March 31	Brantford Bulldogs	6 – 5	OT	Sudbury Wolves	Sudbury Community Arena	Recap
Adam Jiříček (1) - 4:31; Caleb Malhotra (4) - pp - 19:29		First period		No scoring
No scoring		Second period		3:08 - Blake Clayton (1); 10:31 - Chase Coughlan (1); 13:39 - Chase Coughlan (2)
Adam Jiříček (2) - pp - 7:04; Caleb Malhotra (5) - pp - 15:15; Marek Vanacker (2) - pp - 16:38		Third period		4:41 - Jean-Cristoph Lemieux (2); 19:10 - Jan Chovan (2)
Marek Vanacker (3) - pp - 3:40		First overtime period		No scoring
Ryerson Leenders (3-0) (24 saves / 29 shots)		Goalie stats		Paolo Frasca (0-3) (28 saves / 34 shots)

April 2	Brantford Bulldogs	2 – 1	Sudbury Wolves	Sudbury Community Arena	Recap
No scoring		First period	10:28 - Rowan Henderson (1)
Luca Testa (3) - 12:47		Second period	No scoring
Edison Engle (1) - 6:54		Third period	No scoring
Ryerson Leenders (4-0) (20 saves / 21 shots)		Goalie stats	Bjorn Bronas (0-1) (34 saves / 36 shots)

Brantford wins series 4 – 0

===== (2) Barrie Colts vs. (7) Niagara IceDogs =====
March 26	Niagara IceDogs	1 – 4	Barrie Colts	Sadlon Arena	Recap
No scoring		First period	No scoring
Sean Doherty (1) - 12:28		Second period	2:56 - pp - Cole Beaudoin (1); 7:00 - Parker Von Richter (1)
No scoring		Third period	10:59 - Teague Vader (1); 18:27 - en - Ben Wilmott (1)
Vladislav Yermolenko (0-1) (35 saves / 38 shots)		Goalie stats	Ben Hrebik (1-0) (23 saves / 24 shots)

March 28	Niagara IceDogs	4 – 3	OT	Barrie Colts	Sadlon Arena	Recap
No scoring		First period		3:05 - Cole Beaudoin (2)
Ethan Czata (1) - pp - 5:42		Second period		18:49 - pp - Calvin Crombie (1)
Ryerson Edgar (1) - pp - 1:30; Riley Patterson (1) - 7:46		Third period		14:55 - pp - Brad Gardiner (1)
Hayden Reid (1) - 13:19		First overtime period		No scoring
Vladislav Yermolenko (1-1) (42 saves / 45 shots)		Goalie stats		Arvin Jaswal (0-1) (31 saves / 35 shots)

March 31	Barrie Colts	5 – 2	Niagara IceDogs	Meridian Centre	Recap
Brad Gardiner (2) - 13:50; Emil Hemming (1) - 15:51		First period	14:18 - Noah Read (1)
Kashawn Aitcheson (1) - pp - 17:26		Second period	9:37 - Riley Patterson (1)
Joe Salandra (1) - pp - 1:16; Ben Wilmott (2) - en - 17:49		Third period	No scoring
Ben Hrebik (2-0) (16 saves / 18 shots)		Goalie stats	Vladislav Yermolenko (1-2) (30 saves / 34 shots)

April 2	Barrie Colts	9 – 6	Niagara IceDogs	Meridian Centre	Recap
Ben Wilmott (3) - 0:43; Nicholas Desiderio (1) - 1:11; Cole Beaudoin (3) - 2:39; Emil Hemming (2) - 5:19; Cole Beaudoin (4) - 11:32		First period	16:58 - Ivan Galiyanov (1)
Brad Gardiner (3) - pp - 2:59; Mason Zebeski (1) - 9:27; Emil Hemming (3) - 10:29		Second period	12:41 - pp - Riley Patterson (3); 13:29 - pp - Riley Patterson (4)
Ben Wilmott (4) - pp - 6:30		Third period	1:39 - pp - Blake Barnes (1); 5:20 - Reyth Smith (1); 19:25 - pp - Hayden Reid (2)
Ben Hrebik (3-0) (21 saves / 27 shots)		Goalie stats	Vladislav Yermolenko (3 saves / 6 shots); Charlie Robertson (0-1) (21 saves / 27 shots)

April 4	Niagara IceDogs	0 – 5	Barrie Colts	Sadlon Arena	Recap
No scoring		First period	10:49 - pp - Brad Gardiner (4)
No scoring		Second period	4:42 - Carter Lowe (1); 9:54 - Ben Wilmott (5)
		Third period	6:57 - William Schneid (1); 7:53 - pp - Emil Hemming (4)
Vladislav Yermolenko (1-3) (38 saves / 43 shots)		Goalie stats	Ben Hrebik (4-0) (29 saves / 29 shots)

Barrie wins series 4 – 1

===== (3) Ottawa 67's vs. (6) Kingston Frontenacs =====
March 27	Kingston Frontenacs	4 – 7	Ottawa 67's	TD Place Arena	Recap
Nolan Snyder (1) - 16:33		First period	5:58 - Filip Ekberg (1); 7:36 - Spencer Bowes (1)
Tomas Pobezal (1) - 4:42; Will Bishop (1) - 12:15; Riley Clark (1) - 12:26		Second period	1:29 - Filip Ekberg (2); 7:09 - pp - Nic Sima (1); 19:30 - David Bedkowski (1)
No scoring		Third period	13:08 - pp - Cooper Foster (1); 19:22 - en - sh - Connor Bewick (1)
Gavin Betts (0-1) (24 saves / 30 shots)		Goalie stats	Ryder Fetterolf (1-0) (27 saves / 31 shots)

March 29	Kingston Frontenacs	3 – 4	Ottawa 67's	TD Place Arena	Recap
Alex McLean (1) - 7:00		First period	15:44 - pp - Thomas Vandenberg (1); 17:31 - Jasper Kuhta (1)
No scoring		Second period	6:35 - Shaan Kingwell (1); 7:41 - pp - Thomas Vandenberg (2)
Aleks Kulemin (1) - pp - 1:26; Alex Misiak (1) - 3:59		Third period	No scoring
Gavin Betts (0-2) (21 saves / 25 shots); Matthew Minchak (17 shots / 17 saves)		Goalie stats	Ryder Fetterolf (2-0) (22 saves / 25 shots)

March 31	Ottawa 67's	4 – 1	Kingston Frontenacs	Slush Puppie Place	Recap
Spencer Bowes (2) - 15:49		First period	No scoring
No scoring		Second period	No scoring
Jasper Kuhta (2) - pp - 13:12; Sam McCue (1) - 14:10; Nic Sima (2) - en - 19:09		Third period	16:26 - pp - Matthew Henderson (1)
Ryder Fetterolf (3-0) (17 saves / 18 shots)		Goalie stats	Matthew Minchak (0-1) (33 saves / 36 shots)

April 2	Ottawa 67's	3 – 2	Kingston Frontenacs	Slush Puppie Place	Recap
Sam McCue (2) - 0:41; Nic Sima (3) - 2:40		First period	10:19 - Matthew Frost (1)
No scoring		Second period	1:07 - Robin Kuzma (1)
Filip Ekberg (3) - 19:29		Third period	No scoring
Ryder Fetterolf (4-0) (20 saves / 22 shots)		Goalie stats	Matthew Minchak (1 save / 3 shots); Gavin Betts (0-3) (20 saves / 21 shots)

Ottawa wins series 4 – 0

===== (4) Peterborough Petes vs. (5) North Bay Battalion =====
March 26	North Bay Battalion	1 – 0	Peterborough Petes	Peterborough Memorial Centre	Recap
No scoring		First period	No scoring
Lirim Amidovski (1) - 15:43		Second period	No scoring
No scoring		Third period	No scoring
Jack Lisson (1-0) (26 saves / 26 shots)		Goalie stats	Easton Rye (0-1) (29 saves / 30 shots)

March 27	North Bay Battalion	3 – 4	OT	Peterborough Petes	Peterborough Memorial Centre	Recap
Cam Warren (1) - 5:48; Ryder Carey (1) - 17:00		First period		2:24 - Francis Parish (1); 11:39 - Brennan Faulkner (1); 16:26 - Braydon McCallum (1)
Kent Greer (1) - 18:55		Second period		No scoring
No scoring		Third period		No scoring
No scoring		First overtime period		13:54 - Kieron Walton (1)
Jack Lisson (1-1) (36 saves / 40 shots)		Goalie stats		Easton Rye (1-1) (40 saves / 43 shots)

March 29	Peterborough Petes	2 – 1	OT	North Bay Battalion	Boart Longyear Memorial Gardens	Recap
Adam Levac (1) - 0:12		First period		No scoring
No scoring		Second period		18:55 - sh - Sebastian Gervais (1)
No scoring		Third period		No scoring
Kieron Walton (2) - pp - 17:41		First overtime period		No scoring
Easton Rye (2-1) (47 saves / 48 shots)		Goalie stats		Mike McIvor (41 saves / 42 shots); Jack Lisson (1-2) (1 save / 2 shots)

March 31	Peterborough Petes	0 – 4	North Bay Battalion	Boart Longyear Memorial Gardens	Recap
No scoring		First period	9:36 - Cam Warren (2); 11:21 - Ryder Cali (1)
No scoring		Second period	2:37 - Parker Vaughan (1)
No scoring		Third period	7:55 - Nick Wellenreiter (1)
Easton Rye (2-2) (35 saves / 39 shots)		Goalie stats	Jack Lisson (2-2) (33 saves / 33 shots)

April 2	North Bay Battalion	3 – 1	Peterborough Petes	Peterborough Memorial Centre	Recap
Lirim Amidovski (2) - 14:52		First period	No scoring
Parker Vaughan (2) - 3:38		Second period	No scoring
Ethan Procyszyn (1) - en - 19:46		Third period	15:16 - Braydon McCallum (2)
Jack Lisson (3-2) (44 saves / 45 shots)		Goalie stats	Easton Rye (2-3) (21 saves / 23 shots)

April 4	Peterborough Petes	4 – 5	2OT	North Bay Battalion	Boart Longyear Memorial Gardens	Recap
Leon Kolarik (1) - 8:38		First period		No scoring
No scoring		Second period		6:25 - pp - Cam Warren (3); 10:05 - pp - Parker Vaughan (3); 12:51 - Ethan Procyszyn (2)
Yanis Lutz (1) - 5:22; Adam Levac (2) - 6:13; Kieron Walton (3) - 15:18		Third period		19:54 - pp - Ethan Procyszyn (3)
No scoring		Second overtime period		17:09 - Evgeny Dubrovtsev (1)
Easton Rye (2-4) (39 saves / 44 shots)		Goalie stats		Jack Lisson (4-2) (52 saves / 56 shots)

North Bay wins series 4 – 2

==== Western conference quarterfinals ====
===== (1) Kitchener Rangers vs. (8) Saginaw Spirit =====
March 27	Saginaw Spirit	4 – 6	Kitchener Rangers	Kitchener Memorial Auditorium	Recap
No scoring		First period	10:13 - pp - Sam O'Reilly (1)
Egor Barabanov (1) - 0:59; Dimian Zhilkin (1) - 8:56; Levi Harper (1) - 19:14		Second period	18:14 - pp - Sam O'Reilly (2)
Dimian Zhilkin (2) - 10:12		Third period	4:30 - Christian Humphreys (1); 12:37 - pp - Christian Humphreys (2); 13:16 - Cameron Reid (1); 19:55 - en - Matthew Andonovski (1)
Stepan Shurygin (0-1) (34 saves / 39 shots)		Goalie stats	Christian Kirsch (1-0) (21 saves / 25 shots)

March 29	Saginaw Spirit	0 – 4	Kitchener Rangers	Kitchener Memorial Auditorium	Recap
No scoring		First period	No scoring
No scoring		Second period	No scoring
No scoring		Third period	0:43 - Sam O'Reilly (3); 3:04 - Gabriel Chiarot (1); 7:09 - Tanner Lam (1); 16:11 - Cameron Reid (2)
Stepan Shurygin (0-2) (23 saves / 27 shots)		Goalie stats	Christian Kirsch (2-0) (14 saves / 14 shots)

March 31	Kitchener Rangers	4 – 3	OT	Saginaw Spirit	Dow Event Center	Recap
Matthew Andonovski (2) - 1:28		First period		14:54 - James Guo (1)
Alexander Bilecki (1) - 8:23		Second period		18:25 - Bode Stewart (1)
Gabriel Chiarot (2) - 14:21		Third period		3:31 - pp - Nikita Klepov (1)
Luca Romano (1) - 6:39		First overtime period		No scoring
Christian Kirsch (3-0) (17 saves / 20 shots)		Goalie stats		Stepan Shurygin (0-3) (50 saves / 54 shots)

April 2	Kitchener Rangers	5 – 1	Saginaw Spirit	Dow Event Center	Recap
Sam O'Reilly (4) - 6:39; Dylan Edwards (1) - 13:25; Dylan Edwards (2) - pp - 19:45		First period	No scoring
Christian Humphreys (3) - 17:42		Second period	18:29 - pp - Dimian Zhilkin (3)
Christian Humphreys (4) - en - 14:33		Third period	No scoring
Christian Kirsch (4-0) (13 saves / 14 shots)		Goalie stats	Stepan Shurygin (0-4) (37 saves / 41 shots)

Kitchener wins series 4 – 0

===== (2) Windsor Spitfires vs. (7) Guelph Storm =====
March 26	Guelph Storm	0 – 4	Windsor Spitfires	WFCU Centre	Recap
No scoring		First period	1:59 - Nathan Gaymes (1)
No scoring		Second period	4:08 - Nathan Villeneuve (1)
No scoring		Third period	4:42 - pp - Jakub Fibgir (1); 14:34 - Liam Greentree (1)
Zach Jovanovski (0-1) (22 saves / 26 shots)		Goalie stats	Joey Costanzo (1-0) (20 saves / 20 shots)

March 28	Guelph Storm	1 – 4	Windsor Spitfires	WFCU Centre	Recap
Carter Stevens (1) - 19:00		First period	12:27 - sh - A.J. Spellacy (1)
No scoring		Second period	7:51 - pp - Liam Greentree (2); 16:05 - pp - Jack Nesbitt (1)
No scoring		Third period	19:03 - sh - en - Liam Greentree (3)
Zach Jovanovski (0-2) (38 saves / 41 shots)		Goalie stats	Joey Costanzo (2-0) (28 saves / 29 shots)

March 31	Windsor Spitfires	2 – 1	Guelph Storm	Sleeman Centre	Recap
John McLaughlin (1) - 3:41		First period	No scoring
No scoring		Second period	No scoring
John McLaughlin (2) - en - 18:35		Third period	19:25 - Rylan Singh (1)
Joey Costanzo (3-0) (27 saves / 28 shots)		Goalie stats	Zach Jovanovski (0-3) (35 saves / 36 shots)

April 2	Windsor Spitfires	11 – 3	Guelph Storm	Sleeman Centre	Recap
Liam Greentree (4) - 14:09; Jack Nesbitt (2) - 19:25		First period	12:51 - ps - Ethan Miedema (1); 16:58 - Tyler Hopkins (1)
John McLaughlin (3) - 1:00; Ethan Garden (1) - 2:25; Alex Pharand (1) - 2:36; Carson Woodall (1) - pp - 5:34; Cole Davis (1) - sh - 14:06		Second period	No scoring
Ethan Garden (2) - 1:06; Andrew Robinson (1) - 1:18; Cole Davis (2) - 6:15; Max Brocklehurst (1) - 18:52		Third period	18:13 - Tyler Hopkins (2)
Joey Costanzo (4-0) (24 saves / 27 shots)		Goalie stats	Zach Jovanovski (0-4) (13 saves / 18 shots); Colin Ellsworth (12 saves / 18 shots)

Windsor wins series 4 – 0

===== (3) Flint Firebirds vs. (6) Owen Sound Attack =====
March 26	Owen Sound Attack	1 – 8	Flint Firebirds	Dort Financial Center	Recap
No scoring		First period	8:04 - pp - Jacob Battaglia (1); 13:13 - pp - Nathan Aspinall (1); 15:17 - pp - Jimmy Lombardi (1); 19:24 - Christopher Thibodeau (1)
No scoring		Second period	16:05 - Jacob Battaglia (2)
Masen Wray (1) - pp - 16:36		Third period	0:28 - Darian Anderson (1); 13:27 - pp - Dryden Allen (1); 18:36 - Xavier Tessier (1)
Matthew Koprowski (0-1) (32 saves / 40 shots)		Goalie stats	Mason Vaccari (1-0) (24 saves / 25 shots)

March 28	Owen Sound Attack	1 – 11	Flint Firebirds	Dort Financial Center	Recap
No scoring		First period	9:04 - sh - Kevin He (1); 10:29 - Kevin He (2); 16:29 - pp - Darian Anderson (2); 18:49 - Christopher Thibodeau (2)
No scoring		Second period	5:57 - Jacob Battaglia (3); 10:11 - pp - Jimmy Lombardi (2); 16:03 - pp - Alex Kostov (1); 19:08 - Nathan Aspinall (2)
Cole Zurawski (1) - 19:56		Third period	0:18 - pp - Brady Smith (1); 13:12 - sh - Ryland Cunningham (1); 17:17 - Xavier Tessier (2)
Trenten Bennett (0-1) (11 saves / 17 shots); Matthew Koprowski (16 saves / 21 shots)		Goalie stats	Mason Vaccari (2-0) (25 saves / 26 shots)

March 30	Flint Firebirds	10 – 0	Owen Sound Attack	Bayshore Community Centre	Recap
Darian Anderson (3) - 3:49; Ihnat Pazii (1) - 6:16; Nathan Aspinall (3) - 7:09		First period	No scoring
Jimmy Lombardi (3) - 4:26; Ryland Cunningham (2) - 6:16; Alex Kostov (2) - 6:51; Darian Anderson (4) - 7:37		Second period	No scoring
Nathan Aspinall (4) - 0:43; Christopher Thibodeau (3) - 5:45; Brady Smith (2) - 10:45		Third period	No scoring
Mason Vaccari (3-0) (32 saves / 32 shots)		Goalie stats	Trenten Bennett (0-2) (10 saves / 17 shots); Dylan Durno (10 saves / 13 shots)

April 1	Flint Firebirds	6 – 1	Owen Sound Attack	Bayshore Community Centre	Recap
Nathan Aspinall (5) - pp - 7:49; Jacob Battaglia (4) - pp - 16:29		First period	No scoring
Jimmy Lombardi (4) - pp - 11:19; Ihnat Pazii (2) - 12:28		Second period	3:05 - pp - Pierce Mbyui (1)
Jacob Battaglia (5) - pp - 7:42; Nathan Aspinall (6) - 9:32		Third period	No scoring
Mason Vaccari (4-0) (30 saves / 31 shots)		Goalie stats	Matthew Koropowski (0-2) (29 saves / 35 shots)

Flint wins series 4 – 0

===== (4) London Knights vs. (5) Sault Ste. Marie Greyhounds =====
March 27	Sault Ste. Marie Greyhounds	4 – 1	London Knights	Canada Life Place	Recap
Jeremy Martin (1) - 15:32; Lukas Fischer (1) - 16:38		First period	0:34 - Jaxon Cover (1)
Marco Mignosa (1) - pp - 15:26		Second period	No scoring
Jeremy Martin (2) - pp - 13:18		Third period	No scoring
Carter George (1-0) (23 saves / 24 shots)		Goalie stats	Sebastian Gatto (0-1) (21 saves / 25 shots)

March 29	Sault Ste. Marie Greyhounds	3 – 2	OT	London Knights	Canada Life Place	Recap
Marco Mignosa (2) - pp - 7:59		First period		No scoring
Chase Reid (1) - 11:44		Second period		16:41 - pp - Braiden Clark (1)
No scoring		Third period		1:23 - Linus Funck (1)
Brady Martin (1) - 19:34		First overtime period		No scoring
Carter George (2-0) (32 saves / 34 shots)		Goalie stats		Sebastian Gatto (0-2) (40 saves / 43 shots)

March 31	London Knights	2 – 3	2OT	Sault Ste. Marie Greyhounds	GFL Memorial Gardens	Recap
Jaxon Cover (2) - pp - 13:24		First period		19:01 - Callum Croskery (1)
Evan Van Gorp (1) - ps - 5:22		Second period		No scoring
No scoring		Third period		16:01 - Jordan Charron (1)
No scoring		Second overtime period		2:13 - Carson Andrew (1)
Sebastian Gatto (0-3) (42 saves / 45 shots)		Goalie stats		Carter George (3-0) (28 saves / 30 shots)

April 1	London Knights	4 – 1	Sault Ste. Marie Greyhounds	GFL Memorial Gardens	Recap
No scoring		First period	6:55 - Quinn McKenzie (1)
Jacob Vandeven (1) - 6:51; Ryan Brown (1) - pp - 13:41		Second period	No scoring
Ryan Brown (2) - 14:58; Ryan Brown (3) - en - 16:57		Third period	No scoring
Alexei Medvedev (1-0) (25 saves / 26 shots)		Goalie stats	Carter George (3-1) (22 saves / 25 shots)

April 3	Sault Ste. Marie Greyhounds	4 – 0	London Knights	Canada Life Place	Recap
Marco Mignosa (3) - 2:14; Chase Reid (2) - 7:52		First period	No scoring
Marco Mignosa (4) - 16:44		Second period	No scoring
Brady Martin (2) - pp - 13:47		Third period	No scoring
Carter George (4-1) (25 saves / 25 shots)		Goalie stats	Alexei Medvedev (1-1) (23 saves / 27 shots)

Sault Ste. Marie wins series 4 – 1

=== Conference semifinals ===
==== Eastern conference semifinals ====
===== (1) Brantford Bulldogs vs. (5) North Bay Battalion =====
April 8	North Bay Battalion	1 – 8	Brantford Bulldogs	TD Civic Centre	Recap
No scoring		First period	2:25 - pp - Caleb Malhotra (6); 9:08 - Jett Luchanko (1); 12:51 - Cooper Dennis (2); 16:51 - Caleb Malhotra (7); 18:37 - Jake O'Brien (1)
No scoring		Second period	4:35 - Adam Jiříček (3); 14:00 - Luca Testa (4)
Brandt Harper (1) - 5:28		Third period	1:46 - Jake O'Brien (2)
Jack Lisson (4-3) (14 saves / 19 shots); Mike McIvor (19 saves / 22 shots)		Goalie stats	Ryerson Leenders (5-0) (31 saves / 32 shots)

April 10	North Bay Battalion	1 – 4	Brantford Bulldogs	TD Civic Centre	Recap
No scoring		First period	19:54 - Caleb Malhotra (8)
Adrian Manzo (1) - 16:51		Second period	1:16 - Marek Vanacker (4); 9:45 - Marek Vanacker (5); 12:43 - Adam Jiříček (4)
No scoring		Third period	No scoring
Jack Lisson (4-4) (25 saves / 29 shots)		Goalie stats	Ryerson Leenders (6-0) (20 saves / 21 shots)

April 12	Brantford Bulldogs	3 – 2	2OT	North Bay Battalion	Boart Longyear Memorial Gardens	Recap
No scoring		First period		0:34 - Cam Warren (4)
Charlie Paquette (1) - pp - 2:28		Second period		No scoring
Adam Benák (2) - 18:18		Third period		9:26 - Ethan Procyszyn (4)
Ben Danford (1) - 14:33		Second overtime period		No scoring
Ryerson Leenders (7-0) (24 saves / 26 shots)		Goalie stats		Mike McIvor (0-1) (55 saves / 58 shots)

April 15	Brantford Bulldogs	5 – 3	North Bay Battalion	Boart Longyear Memorial Gardens	Recap
Gabriel Frasca (2) - 7:11; Adam Jiříček (5) - 7:31; Parker Holmes (1) - 13:44		First period	17:08 - Ryder Carey (2)
No scoring		Second period	1:17 - Shamar Moses (1); 9:39 - sh - Parker Vaughan (5)
Jake O'Brien (3) - 8:14; Marek Vanacker (6) - en - 19:43		Third period	No scoring
David Egorov (1-0) (24 saves / 27 shots)		Goalie stats	Mike McIvor (0-2) (34 saves / 38 shots)

Brantford wins series 4 – 0

===== (2) Barrie Colts vs. (3) Ottawa 67's =====
April 9	Ottawa 67's	2 – 4	Barrie Colts	Sadlon Arena	Recap
No scoring		First period	0:33 - Mason Zebeski (2); 5:13 - pp - Kashawn Aitcheson (2)
Nic Whitehead (1) - pp - 12:15		Second period	14:43 - Ben Wilmott (6)
Thomas Vandenberg (3) - 12:24		Third period	1:15 - pp - Emil Hemming (5)
Ryder Fetterolf (4-1) (30 saves / 34 shots)		Goalie stats	Ben Hrebik (5-0) (32 saves / 34 shots)

April 11	Ottawa 67's	3 – 5	Barrie Colts	Sadlon Arena	Recap
Spencer Bowes (3) - 8:34		First period	7:29 - Cole Beaudoin (5)
Cooper Foster (2) - 4:40		Second period	6:16 - Calvin Crombie (2); 16:15 - pp - Carter Lowe (2)
Frankie Marrelli (1) - 14:41		Third period	1:39 - Emil Hemming (6); 7:07 - Ben Wilmott (7)
Ryder Fetterolf (4-2) (30 saves / 35 shots)		Goalie stats	Ben Hrebik (6-0) (32 saves / 35 shots)

April 14	Barrie Colts	2 – 5	Ottawa 67's	TD Place Arena	Recap
Calvin Crombie (3) - 12:03		First period	No scoring
No scoring		Second period	9:11 - pp - Frankie Marrelli (2); 16:05 - Thomas Vandenberg (4); 19:38 - pp - Cooper Foster (3)
Ben Wilmott (8) - 6:43		Third period	4:17 - Spencer Bowes (4); 19:08 - en - sh - Nic Sima (4)
Ben Hrebik (6-1) (32 saves / 36 shots)		Goalie stats	Ryder Fetterolf (5-2) (36 saves / 38 shots)

April 16	Barrie Colts	3 – 2	Ottawa 67's	TD Place Arena	Recap
Carter Lowe (3) - pp - 14:53		First period	No scoring
Emil Hemming (7) - 12:23		Second period	No scoring
Joe Salandra (2) - pp - 7:37		Third period	16:50 - pp - Nic Sima (5); 18:02 - pp - Frankie Marrelli (3)
Ben Hrebik (7-1) (33 saves / 35 shots)		Goalie stats	Ryder Fetterolf (5-3) (40 saves / 43 shots)

April 18	Ottawa 67's	1 – 4	Barrie Colts	Sadlon Arena	Recap
No scoring		First period	13:25 - Cole Beaudoin (6)
Nic Whitehead (2) - 17:47		Second period	13:36 - Cole Beaudoin (7)
No scoring		Third period	12:59 - pp - Kashawn Aitcheson (3); 17:54 - en - Emil Hemming (8)
Ryder Fetterolf (5-4) (21 saves / 25 shots)		Goalie stats	Ben Hrebik (8-1) (33 saves / 34 shots)

Barrie wins series 4 – 1

==== Western conference semifinals ====
===== (1) Kitchener Rangers vs. (5) Sault Ste. Marie Greyhounds =====
April 10	Sault Ste. Marie Greyhounds	1 – 3	Kitchener Rangers	Kitchener Memorial Auditorium	Recap
No scoring		First period	No scoring
No scoring		Second period	2:15 - Haeden Ellis (1); 8:05 - Haeden Ellis (2)
Quinn McKenzie (2) - 6:25		Third period	19:59 - en - Sam O'Reilly (5)
Carter George (4-2) (23 saves / 25 shots)		Goalie stats	Christian Kirsch (5-0) (27 saves / 28 shots)

April 12	Sault Ste. Marie Greyhounds	5 – 8	Kitchener Rangers	Kitchener Memorial Auditorium	Recap
No scoring		First period	16:31 - Sam O'Reilly (6)
Marco Mignosa (5) - 5:56; Marco Mignosa (6) - 12:46; Jeremy Martin (3) - 14:25		Second period	4:39 - Avry Anstis (1); 10:28 - pp - Christian Humphreys (5)
Quinn McKenzie (3) - pp - 0:53; Jeremy Martin (4) - 5:13		Third period	3:20 - pp - Dylan Edwards (3); 8:16 - Tanner Lam (2); 13:40 - Dylan Edwards (4); 18:17 - en - Sam O'Reilly (7); 19:26 - en - Sam O'Reilly (8)
Carter George (4-3) (30 saves / 36 shots)		Goalie stats	Christian Kirsch (6-0) (25 saves / 30 shots)

April 14	Kitchener Rangers	4 – 3	Sault Ste. Marie Greyhounds	GFL Memorial Gardens	Recap
Haeden Ellis (3) - 11:42		First period	14:02 - Quinn McKenzie (4)
Dylan Edwards (5) - 17:50		Second period	No scoring
Dylan Edwards (6) - pp - 5:39; Dylan Edwards (7) - 14:43		Third period	1:41 - Brady Martin (3); 13:50 - pp - Chase Reid (3)
Christian Kirsch (7-0) (18 saves / 21 shots)		Goalie stats	Carter George (4-4) (20 saves / 24 shots)

April 16	Kitchener Rangers	2 – 4	Sault Ste. Marie Greyhounds	GFL Memorial Gardens	Recap
Cameron Arquette (1) - 4:50; Matthew Hlacar (1) - 11:28		First period	No scoring
No scoring		Second period	No scoring
No scoring		Third period	5:56 - Jordan Charron (2); 8:13 - Jordan Charron (3); 9:58 - Travis Hayes (1); 18:38 - en - Marco Mignosa (7)
Christian Kirsch (7-1) (29 saves / 32 shots)		Goalie stats	Carter George (5-4) (20 saves / 22 shots)

April 17	Sault Ste. Marie Greyhounds	1 – 5	Kitchener Rangers	Kitchener Memorial Auditorium	Recap
Quinn McKenzie (5) - 0:54		First period	4:55 - Cameron Arquette (2)
No scoring		Second period	7:41 - Jared Woolley (1); 13:38 - pp - Dylan Edwards (8)
No scoring		Third period	17:05 - en - Sam O'Reilly (9); 19:39 - en - Sam O'Reilly (10)
Carter George (5-5) (32 saves / 36 shots)		Goalie stats	Christian Kirsch (8-1) (15 saves / 16 shots)

Kitchener wins series 4 – 1

===== (2) Windsor Spitfires vs. (3) Flint Firebirds =====
April 10	Flint Firebirds	2 – 4	Windsor Spitfires	WFCU Centre	Recap
Darian Anderson (5) - pp - 16:52		First period	2:59 - pp - Ethan Garden (2); 6:19 - Max Brocklehurst (2)
No scoring		Second period	No scoring
Brady Smith (3) - 12:39		Third period	15:03 - pp - Jack Nesbitt (3); 19:13 - en - Jack Nesbitt (4)
Mason Vaccari (4-1) (21 saves / 24 shots)		Goalie stats	Joey Costanzo (5-0) (22 saves / 24 shots)

April 12	Flint Firebirds	5 – 6	Windsor Spitfires	WFCU Centre	Recap
Kevin He (3) - 11:51; Christopher Thibodeau (4) - 17:08		First period	4:09 - Caden Harvey (1); 9:34 - Liam Greentree (5); 13:47 - Cole Davis (3)
Darian Anderson (6) - pp - 3:02; Nathan Aspinall (7) - 15:36; Nathan Aspinall (8) - 18:58		Second period	No scoring
No scoring		Third period	2:48 - Caden Harvey (2); 12:57 - Jack Nesbitt (5); 19:00 - Connor Walton (1)
Mason Vaccari (4-2) (25 saves / 31 shots)		Goalie stats	Joey Costanzo (6-0) (22 saves / 27 shots)

April 14	Windsor Spitfires	2 – 1	Flint Firebirds	Dort Financial Center	Recap
Anthony Cristoforo (1) - 3:32		First period	No scoring
AJ Spellacy (2) - 4:27		Second period	No scoring
No scoring		Third period	1:56 - Alex Kostov (3)
Joey Costanzo (7-0) (18 saves / 19 shots)		Goalie stats	Mason Vaccari (4-3) (25 saves / 27 shots)

April 16	Windsor Spitfires	5 – 3	Flint Firebirds	Dort Financial Center	Recap
No scoring		First period	9:22 - James Paul (1)
Anthony Cristoforo (2) - pp - 2:03; Cole Davis (4) - 17:28		Second period	No scoring
Carson Woodall (2) - 3:59; Jakub Fibigr (2) - 12:25; Jack Nesbitt (6) - en - 19:27		Third period	10:06 - Nathan Aspinall (9); 14:38 - pp - Nathan Aspinall (10)
Joey Costanzo (8-0) (20 saves / 23 shots)		Goalie stats	Mason Vaccari (4-4) (32 saves / 36 shots)

Windsor wins series 4 – 0

=== Conference finals ===
==== Eastern conference finals ====
===== (1) Brantford Bulldogs vs. (2) Barrie Colts =====
April 22	Barrie Colts	3 – 4	Brantford Bulldogs	TD Civic Centre	Recap
No scoring		First period	No scoring
Carter Lowe (4) - 3:32		Second period	1:35 - pp - Jake O'Brien (4); 3:59 - Caleb Malhotra (9)
Cole Beaudoin (8) - pp - 12:59; Kashawn Aitcheson (4) - 15:18		Third period	1:15 - pp - Caleb Malhotra (10); 18:25 - Jake O'Brien (5)
Ben Hrebik (8-2) (31 saves / 35 shots)		Goalie stats	Ryerson Leenders (8-0) (34 saves / 37 shots)

April 24	Barrie Colts	5 – 3	Brantford Bulldogs	TD Civic Centre	Recap
Ben Wilmott (9) - pp - 14:46		First period	11:17 - pp - Marek Vanacker (7)
Brad Gardiner (5) - 5:22; Kashawn Aitcheson (5) - pp - 18:30		Second period	18:53 - Adam Jiříček (6)
Cole Beaudoin (9) - 3:52; Cole Beaudoin (10) - sh - 6:06		Third period	17:17 - Adam Jiříček (7)
Ben Hrebik (9-2) (25 saves / 28 shots)		Goalie stats	Ryerson Leenders (8-1) (22 saves / 27 shots)

April 26	Brantford Bulldogs	2 – 0	Barrie Colts	Sadlon Arena	Recap
No scoring		First period	No scoring
Jett Luchanko (2) - 12:00		Second period	No scoring
Gariel Frasca (3) - en - 19:28		Third period	No scoring
Ryerson Leenders (9-1) (22 saves / 22 shots)		Goalie stats	Ben Hrebik (9-3) (37 saves / 38 shots)

April 28	Brantford Bulldogs	6 – 1	Barrie Colts	Sadlon Arena	Recap
Cooper Dennis (3) - 4:41; Adam Benák (3) - pp - 10:25; Charlie Paquette (2) - 11:17		First period	No scoring
Cooper Dennis (4) - 15:17; Charlie Paquette (3) - 19:39		Second period	5:43 - pp - Emil Hemming (9)
Caleb Malhotra (11) - pp - 7:07		Third period	No scoring
Ryerson Leenders (10-1) (25 saves / 26 shots)		Goalie stats	Ben Hrebik (9-4) (20 saves / 25 shots); Arvin Jaswal (14 saves / 15 shots)

April 30	Barrie Colts	4 – 3	OT	Brantford Bulldogs	TD Civic Centre	Recap
No scoring		First period		8:02 - Caleb Malhotra (12)
Emil Hemming (10) - pp - 5:44		Second period		11:41 - pp - Marek Vanacker (8)
William Schneid (2) - 8:42; Jaiden Newton (1) - 10:43		Third period		11:19 - Caleb Malhotra (13)
Brad Gardiner (6) - 13:40		First overtime period		No scoring
Ben Hrebik (10-4) (34 saves / 37 shots)		Goalie stats		Ryerson Leenders (10-2) (27 saves / 31 shots)

May 2	Brantford Bulldogs	3 – 4	OT	Barrie Colts	Sadlon Arena	Recap
Cooper Dennis (5) - 6:25		First period		No scoring
Ryder Boulton (1) - 4:21; Jake O'Brien (6) - 13:10		Second period		2:41 - Jaiden Newton (2); 18:19 - Carter Lowe (5)
No scoring		Third period		9:54 - Jaiden Newton (3)
No scoring		First overtime period		9:38 - Mason Zebeski (3)
Ryerson Leenders (10-3) (24 saves / 28 shots)		Goalie stats		Ben Hrebik (11-4) (54 saves / 57 shots)

May 4	Barrie Colts	5 – 0	Brantford Bulldogs	TD Civic Centre	Recap
Kashawn Aitcheson (6) - 18:39		First period	No scoring
No scoring		Second period	No scoring
Emil Hemming (11) - pp - 0:38; Carter Lowe (6) - 5:18; Parker von Richter (2) - en - 15:10; Emil Hemming (12) - en - 16:42		Third period	No scoring
Ben Hrebik (12-4) (40 saves / 40 shots)		Goalie stats	Ryerson Leenders (10-4) (25 saves / 28 shots)

Barrie wins series 4 – 3

==== Western conference finals ====
===== (1) Kitchener Rangers vs. (2) Windsor Spitfires =====
April 24	Windsor Spitfires	3 – 4	OT	Kitchener Rangers	Kitchener Memorial Auditorium	Recap
Anthony Cristoforo (3) - 0:47; Nathan Villeneuve (2) - 17:13		First period		4:07 - Alexander Bilecki (2); 7:18 - Dylan Edwards (9)
Jack Nesbitt (7) - 15:58		Second period		19:49 - pp - Jack Pridham (1)
No scoring		Third period		No scoring
No scoring		First overtime period		18:08 - pp - Sam O'Reilly (11)
Joey Costanzo (8-1) (26 saves / 30 shots)		Goalie stats		Christian Kirsch (9-1) (20 saves / 23 shots)

April 26	Windsor Spitfires	1 – 2	Kitchener Rangers	Kitchener Memorial Auditorium	Recap
Liam Greentree (6) - 6:51		First period	No scoring
No scoring		Second period	7:03 - pp - Sam O'Reilly (12); 9:00 - sh - Jack Pridham (2)
No scoring		Third period	No scoring
Joey Costanzo (8-2) (20 saves / 22 shots)		Goalie stats	Christian Kirsch (10-1) (27 saves / 28 shots)

April 27	Kitchener Rangers	2 – 4	Windsor Spitfires	WFCU Centre	Recap
Christian Humphreys (6) - 16:08		First period	1:55 - pp - Jakub Fibigr (3); 14:07 - Alex Pharand (2)
No scoring		Second period	No scoring
Cameron Arquette (3) - 15:01		Third period	0:24 - Andrew Robinson (2); 19:31 - en - Ethan Garden (4)
Christian Kirsch (10-2) (13 saves / 16 shots)		Goalie stats	Joey Costanzo (9-2) (21 saves / 23 shots)

April 29	Kitchener Rangers	6 – 3	Windsor Spitfires	WFCU Centre	Recap
Dylan Edwards (10) - pp - 12:34; Sam O'Reilly (13) - pp - 13:47		First period	No scoring
Cameron Arquette (4) - 3:48; Carson Campbell (1) - 8:50		Second period	No scoring
Luca Romano (2) - sh - 12:59; 17:04 - en - sh - Gabriel Chiarot (3)		Third period	1:45 - Nathan Villeneuve (3); 5:23 - Anthony Cristoforo (4); 18:33 - Caden Harvey (3)
Christian Kirsch (11-2) (25 saves / 28 shots)		Goalie stats	Joey Costanzo (9-3) (22 saves / 27 shots)

May 1	Windsor Spitfires	4 – 5	OT	Kitchener Rangers	Kitchener Memorial Auditorium	Recap
Anthony Cristoforo (5) - 10:08; Cole Davis (5) - 10:22; Wyatt Kennedy (1) - 12:10		First period		15:11 - Luke Ellinas (1)
AJ Spellacy (3) - 17:31		Second period		7:54 - pp - Christian Humphreys (7)
No scoring		Third period		3:51 - Sam O'Reilly (14); 7:58 - Carson Campbell (2)
No scoring		First overtime period		17:33 - Dylan Edwards (11)
Joey Costanzo (9-4) (43 saves / 48 shots)		Goalie stats		Christian Kirsch (12-2) (29 saves / 33 shots)

Kitchener wins series 4 – 1

=== J. Ross Robertson Cup finals ===
==== (W1) Kitchener Rangers vs. (E2) Barrie Colts ====
May 6	Barrie Colts	2 – 5	Kitchener Rangers	Kitchener Memorial Auditorium	Recap
No scoring		First period	10:45 - Andrew MacNiel (1)
Ben Wilmott (10) - 3:21; Ben Wilmott (11) - 15:44		Second period	11:33 - Dylan Edwards (12)
		Third period	4:19 - Andrew MacNiel (2); 7:50 - Cameron Arquette (5); 18:41 - en - Sam O'Reilly (15)
Ben Hrebik (12-5) (27 saves / 31 shots)		Goalie stats	Christian Kirsch (13-2) (25 saves / 27 shots)

May 8	Barrie Colts	3 – 4	OT	Kitchener Rangers	Kitchener Memorial Auditorium	Recap
Brad Gardiner (7) - 18:37		First period		No scoring
Emil Hemming (13) - 11:19		Second period		10:10 - Gabriel Chiarot (4)
Kashawn Aitcheson (7) - pp - 19:57		Third period		0:28 - sh - Carson Campbell (3); 17:34 - pp - Christian Humphreys (8)
No scoring		First overtime period		18:03 - Matthew Andonovski (3)
Ben Hrebik (12-6) (55 saves / 59 shots)		Goalie stats		Christian Kirsch (14-2) (30 saves / 33 shots)

May 10	Kitchener Rangers	4 – 3	2OT	Barrie Colts	Sadlon Arena	Recap
Sam O'Reilly (16) - 18:46		First period		No scoring
No scoring		Second period		No scoring
Carson Campbell (4) - 11:01; Dylan Edwards (13) - 18:48		Third period		10:15 - Emil Hemming (14); 11:37 - William Schneid (3); 19:47 - Kashawn Aitcheson (8)
Dylan Edwards (14) - 5:24		Second overtime period		No scoring
Christian Kirsch (15-2) (36 saves / 39 shots)		Goalie stats		Ben Hrebik (12-7) (46 saves / 50 shots)

May 12	Kitchener Rangers	4 – 2	Barrie Colts	Sadlon Arena	Recap
Luca Romano (3) - 13:38		First period	No scoring
Gabriel Chiarot (5) - sh - 15:59		Second period	16:13 - pp - Emil Hemming (15)
Christian Humphreys (9) - 10:12; Sam O'Reilly (17) - en - 19:44		Third period	8:08 - Eamon Edgar (1)
Christian Kirsch (16-2) (18 saves / 20 shots)		Goalie stats	Ben Hrebik (12-8) (30 saves / 33 shots)

Kitchener wins series 4 – 0

=== J. Ross Robertson Cup Champions Roster ===
2025-26 Kitchener Rangers
Goaltenders: (Canada) 39 – Jason Schaubel; (Switzerland) 65 – Christian Kirsch	Defencemen: (Canada) 5 – Matthew Andonovski; (Canada) 8 – Carson Campbell; (Canada) 18 – Cameron Reid; (Canada) 21 – Kaden Schneider; (Canada) 25 – Max Dirracolo; (Canada) 43 – Andrew MacNiel; (Canada) 51 – Jared Woolley; (Canada) 89 – Alexander Bilecki	Wingers: (United States) 9 – Avry Anstis; (Canada) 11 – Cameron Arquette; (United States) 13 – Haeden Ellis; (Canada) 16 – Dylan Edwards; (Canada) 17 – Weston Cameron; (Canada) 19 – Luke Ellinas; (Canada) 20 – Gabriel Chiarot; (Canada) 24 – Jack Pridham; (Canada) 37 – Tanner Lam; (United States) 48 – Christian Humphreys; (Canada) 61 – Matthew Hlacar; (Canada) 93 – Jack LaBrash	Centres: (Canada) 23 – Sam O'Reilly; (Canada) 27 – Andrew Vermeulen; (Canada) 86 – Luca Romano; Coach: (Finland) Jussi Ahokas; General Manager: (Canada) Mike McKenzie

=== Playoff scoring leaders ===
Note: GP = Games played; G = Goals; A = Assists; Pts = Points; PIM = Penalty minutes

Player	Team	GP	G	A	Pts	PIM
Cole Beaudoin	Barrie Colts	15	10	19	29	17
Sam O'Reilly	Kitchener Rangers	18	17	11	28	12
Emil Hemming	Barrie Colts	21	15	13	28	6
Kashawn Aitcheson	Barrie Colts	19	8	19	27	25
Caleb Malhotra	Brantford Bulldogs	15	13	13	26	4
Dylan Edwards	Kitchener Rangers	18	14	11	25	8
Jake O'Brien	Brantford Bulldogs	15	6	17	23	4
Ben Wilmott	Barrie Colts	20	11	11	22	6
Christian Humphreys	Kitchener Rangers	18	9	13	22	6
Adam Jiříček	Brantford Bulldogs	15	7	15	22	6

=== Playoff leading goaltenders ===
Note: GP = Games played; Mins = Minutes played; W = Wins; L = Losses; GA = Goals Allowed; SO = Shutouts; GAA = Goals against average

Player	Team	GP	MINS	W	L	GA	SO	Sv%	GAA
Easton Rye	Peterborough Petes	6	427	2	4	16	0	0.930	2.25
Mason Vaccari	Flint Firebirds	8	476	4	4	18	1	0.921	2.27
Christian Kirsch	Kitchener Rangers	18	1,163	16	2	45	1	0.900	2.32
Carter George	Sault Ste. Marie Greyhounds	10	635	5	5	25	1	0.910	2.36
Ryerson Leenders	Brantford Bulldogs	14	895	10	4	36	1	0.906	2.41

== Awards ==
Playoffs trophies
Trophy name	Recipient	Ref
J. Ross Robertson Cup; OHL Finals champion	Kitchener Rangers	
Bobby Orr Trophy; Eastern Conference playoff champion	Barrie Colts	
Wayne Gretzky Trophy; Western Conference playoff champion	Kitchener Rangers	
Wayne Gretzky 99 Award; Playoffs MVP	Sam O'Reilly (Kitchener Rangers)	
Regular season — Team trophies
Trophy name	Recipient	Ref
Hamilton Spectator Trophy; Team with best record	Brantford Bulldogs	
Leyden Trophy; East division champion	Brantford Bulldogs	
Emms Trophy; Central division champion	Barrie Colts	
Bumbacco Trophy; West division champion	Windsor Spitfires	
Holody Trophy; Midwest division champion	Kitchener Rangers	
Regular season — Executive awards
Trophy name	Recipient	Ref
Matt Leyden Trophy; Coach of the year	Dave Cameron (Ottawa 67's)	
Jim Gregory Award; General manager of the year	Dave McParlan (Flint Firebirds)	
OHL Executive of the Year; Executive of the Year	–	
Regular season — Player awards
Trophy name	Recipient	Ref
Red Tilson Trophy; Most outstanding player	Sam O'Reilly (London/Kitchener)	
Eddie Powers Memorial Trophy; Top scorer	Nikita Klepov (Saginaw Spirit)	
Dave Pinkney Trophy; Lowest team goals against	Ryder Fetterolf & Jaeden Nelson (Ottawa 67's)	
Max Kaminsky Trophy; Most outstanding defenceman	Kashawn Aitcheson (Barrie Colts)	
Jim Mahon Memorial Trophy; Top scoring right winger	Nikita Klepov (Saginaw Spirit)	
Emms Family Award; Rookie of the year	Nikita Klepov (Saginaw Spirit)	
William Hanley Trophy; Most sportsmanlike player	Cole Beaudoin (Barrie Colts)	
F. W. "Dinty" Moore Trophy; Best rookie GAA	Ryder Fetterolf (Ottawa 67's)	
Bobby Smith Trophy; Scholastic player of the year	Levi Harper (Saginaw Spirit)	
Leo Lalonde Memorial Trophy; Overage player of the year	Jack Pridham (Kitchener Rangers)	
Jim Rutherford Trophy; Goaltender of the year	Ryder Fetterolf (Ottawa 67's)	
Dan Snyder Memorial Trophy; Humanitarian of the year	Carson Woodall (Windsor Spitfires)	
Roger Neilson Memorial Award; Top academic college/university player	Brad Gardiner (Barrie Colts)	
Ivan Tennant Memorial Award; Top academic high school player	Mark Pape (Guelph Storm)	
Mickey Renaud Captain's Trophy; Team captain that best exemplifies character and commitment	Brady Martin (Sault Ste. Marie Greyhounds)	
Prospect player awards
Trophy name	Recipient	Ref
Jack Ferguson Award; First overall pick in priority selection	Kane Cloutier; Oshawa Generals	
Tim Adams Memorial Trophy; OHL Cup MVP	Austin Hall (Detroit HoneyBaked)	

== All-Star teams ==
The OHL All-Star and All-Rookie Teams were selected by the OHL's general managers.

=== First team ===
- Sam O'Reilly, Centre, London/Kitchener
- Nathan Aspinall, Left Wing, Flint Firebirds
- Nikita Klepov, Right Wing, Saginaw Spirit
- Kashawn Aitcheson, Defence, Barrie Colts
- Chase Reid, Defence, Sault Ste. Marie Greyhounds
- Ryder Fetterolf, Goaltender, Ottawa 67's
- Dave Cameron, Coach, Ottawa 67's

=== Second team ===
- Cole Beaudoin, Centre, Barrie Colts
- Liam Greentree, Left Wing, Windsor Spitfires
- Marco Mignosa, Right Wing, Sault Ste. Marie Greyhounds
- Adam Jiříček, Defence, Brantford Bulldogs
- Cameron Reid, Defence, Kitchener Rangers
- Ben Hrebik, Goaltender, Barrie Colts
- Jussi Ahokas, Coach, Kitchener Rangers

=== Third team ===
- Jake O'Brien, Centre, Brantford Bulldogs
- Dylan Edwards, Left Wing, Erie/Kitchener
- Jack Pridham, Right Wing, Kitchener Rangers
- Carson Woodall, Defence, Windsor Spitfires
- Ben Danford, Defence, Oshawa/Brantford
- Carter George, Goaltender, Owen Sound/Sault Ste. Marie
- Jay McKee, Coach, Brantford Bulldogs

=== First All-Rookie team ===
- Caleb Malhotra, Centre, Brantford Bulldogs
- Jaxon Cover, Left Wing, London Knights
- Nikita Klepov, Right Wing, Saginaw Spirit
- Levi Harper, Defence, Sault Ste. Marie Greyhounds
- Cole Emerton, Defence, Ottawa 67's
- Ryder Fetterolf, Goaltender, Ottawa 67's

=== Second All-Rookie team ===
- Ryerson Edgar, Centre, Sarnia Sting
- Noah Laus, Left Wing, Sault Ste. Marie Greyhounds
- Joe Salandra, Right Wing, Saginaw Spirit
- Matthew Perreault, Defence, Peterborough Petes
- Andrew Robinson, Defence, Windsor Spitfires
- Gavin Betts, Goaltender, Kingston Frontenacs

== 2026 OHL Priority Selection ==
On November 13, 2025, the league announced the 2026 OHL Priority Selection would return to an in-person draft event for the first time since 2000 and that it would be hosted by the Kingston Frontenacs at Slush Puppie Place in Kingston, Ontario.

On April 1, 2026, the league announced the results of the Ontario Hockey League Priory Selection Lottery. Each of the four non-playoff participated in the lottery, as the 20th place Oshawa Generals had a 40% chance of winning, the 19th place Erie Otters had a 30% chance of winning, the 18th place Brampton Steelheads had a 20% chance of winning, and the 17th place Sarnia Sting had a 10% chance of winning. The Oshawa Generals won the lottery and selected Kane Cloutier from the Vaughan Kings with the first overall selection.

The entirety of the OHL Priority Selection Draft will take place over two days, as the first round took place on June 12, while rounds 2-15 took place on June 13.

#	Player	Nationality	OHL Team	Hometown	Minor Team
1	Kane Cloutier (C)	Canada	Oshawa Generals	Oakville, Ontario	Vaughan Kings
2	Colin Kennedy (C)	Canada	Erie Otters	Sault Ste. Marie, Ontario	Detroit Little Ceasars
3	Tanner Adams (C)	Canada	Brampton Steelheads	Porcupine, Ontario	Hill Academy
4	Adrian Sgro (LD)	Canada	Sarnia Sting	Tecumseh, Ontario	Vaughan Kings
5	Kash Kwajah (C)	Canada	Sudbury Wolves	Etobicoke, Ontario	Toronto Jr. Canadiens
6	Drew Bate (C)	Canada	Saginaw Spirit	Union, Ontario	London Jr. Knights
7	Declan McNally (LD)	Canada	Guelph Storm	La Salle, Ontario	Don Mills Flyers
8	Max Fransen (RD)	Canada	Owen Sound Attack	Toronto, Ontario	Upper Canada College Blues
9	Max Lappan (RD)	United States	Niagara IceDogs	Livonia, Michigan	Detroit HoneyBaked
10	Logan Prud'homme (C)	Canada	Kingston Frontenacs	Nepean, Ontario	Upper Canada College Blues
11	Owen Loftus (G)	Canada	North Bay Battalion	Toronto, Ontario	Don Mills Flyers
12	Jaden Licastro (LD)	Canada	Sault Ste. Marie Greyhounds	Vaughan, Ontario	Toronto Marlboros
13	Landon Roulston (C)	Canada	Peterborough Petes	Oakville, Ontario	Vaughan Kings
14	Ryan Beaulieu (LD)	Canada	London Knights	London, Ontario	London Jr. Knights
15	Chase Schulberger (RD)	United States	Flint Firebirds	Quakertown, Pennsylvania	Woodbridge Wolfpack
16	Lauchlan Whelan (C)	Canada	Windsor Spitfires	Cobourg, Ontario	Quinte Red Devils
17	Lucas Matheson (LD)	Canada	Barrie Colts	Barrie, Ontario	Barrie Jr. Colts
18	Andrew Laurin (RW)	Canada	Ottawa 67's	Belleville, Ontario	Quinte Red Devils
19	Braden Reilly (RW)	Canada	Kitchener Rangers	Milton, Ontario	Toronto Marlboros
20	Aiden Kelly (C)	United States	Brantford Bulldogs	Oakland Township, Michigan	Detroit Little Ceasars

== 2026 CHL Import Draft ==
On June 30, 2026, the Canadian Hockey League conducted the 2026 CHL Import Draft, in which teams in all three CHL leagues participate in. The Oshawa Generals held the first pick in the draft by a team in the OHL. The Generals selected Matyas Michalek from Czech Republic with the OHL's first selection in the draft.

Below are the players who were selected in the first round by Ontario Hockey League teams in the 2026 CHL Import Draft.

#	Player	Nationality	OHL team	Hometown	Last team
1	Matyas Michalek (LD)	Czech Republic	Oshawa Generals	Prague, Czech Republic	Sparta Praha Jr. B
4	Timothy Kazda (RW)	Slovakia	Guelph Storm	Ilava, Slovakia	Chicago Steel
7	Oskari Ahmajarvi (G)	Finland	Brampton Steelheads	Nurmijärvi, Finland	Kiekko-Espoo U20
10	Ivan Tkach-Tkachenko (G)	Russia	Sarnia Sting	Chernolesovsky, Russia	Ufa Tolpar
13	Adam Nemec (LW)	Czech Republic	Brantford Bulldogs	Vsetín, Czech Republic	Liberec Bili Tygri Jr.
16	Gordei Khotkov (LD)	Russia	Saginaw Spirit	Yaroslavl, Russia	CSKA Moscow 06
19	Paul Schuster (C)	Austria	Erie Otters	Wien, Austria	Red Bull Akademie Juniors
22	Roderick Cernak (RD)	Slovakia	Owen Sound Attack	Bratislava, Slovakia	Slovan Bratislava Jr.
25	Stepan Stejskal (LW)	Czech Republic	Niagara IceDogs	Plzeň, Czech Republic	Davos HC Jr.
28	Martins Klaucans (C)	Latvia	Flint Firebirds	Riga, Latvia	Sherbrooke Phoenix
31	Dmitri Savin (LW)	Russia	Saginaw Spirit	Novosibirsk, Russia	CSKA U18 Moscow
34	David Vermirovsky (G)	Czech Republic	Sault Ste. Marie Greyhounds	Pardubice, Czech Republic	Dynamo Pardubice Jr.
37	Patrik Polacek (LW)	Czech Republic	Peterborough Petes	Praha, Czech Republic	Sparta Praha Jr. B
40	Luca Santala (RW)	Finland	London Knights	Espoo, Finland	Kiekko-Espoo U20
43	Tomas Selic (RW)	Czech Republic	Flint Firebirds	Bratislava, Czech Republic	Brno Kometa Jr. B
46	Bogdan Yakushevsky (RW)	Russia	Windsor Spitfires	Chita, Russia	CSKA U18 Moscow
49	Matvei Nikonovich (G)	Belarus	Barrie Colts	Minsk, Belarus	Togliatti Ladia
52	Vilho Vanhatalo (RW)	Finland	Ottawa 67's	Tampere, Finland	Tappara Tampere U20
55	Roman Andreyev (RW)	Russia	Kitchener Rangers	Moscow, Russia	Dynamo Moscow U18
57	Max Calce (C)	Germany	Brantford Bulldogs	Mannheim, Germany	Adler Mannheim

== 2026 NHL entry draft ==
On June 26–27, 2026, the National Hockey League conducted the 2026 NHL entry draft at KeyBank Center in Buffalo, New York. Caleb Malhotra of the Brantford Bulldogs was the highest player from the OHL to be selected, as he was taken with the 3rd overall pick by the Vancouver Canucks. A total of 47 OHL players were selected in the draft.

Below are the players selected from OHL teams at the NHL Entry Draft.

Round	#	Player	Nationality	NHL team	Hometown	OHL team
1	3	Caleb Malhotra (C)	Canada	Vancouver Canucks	Toronto, Ontario	Brantford Bulldogs
1	7	Chase Reid (RD)	United States	Seattle Kraken	Chesterfield, Michigan	Sault Ste. Marie Greyhounds
1	15	Nikita Klepov (RW)	United States; Russia	Anaheim Ducks	Deerfield Beach, Florida	Saginaw Spirit
1	17	Ethan Belchetz (LW)	Canada	Utah Mammoth	Oakville, Ontario	Windsor Spitfires
1	24	Adam Novotný (LW)	Czech Republic	Vancouver Canucks	Hradec Králové, Czech Republic	Peterborough Petes
1	27	Maksim Sokolovskii (LD)	Russia; Kazakhstan	Philadelphia Flyers	Petropavl, Kazakhstan	London Knights
1	32	Jaxon Cover (RW)	United States; Cayman Islands	Ottawa Senators	Miami, Florida	London Knights
2	33	Brooks Rogowski (C)	United States	Vancouver Canucks	Brighton, Michigan	Oshawa Generals
2	35	Ryan Roobroeck (LW)	Canada	Chicago Blackhawks	London, Ontario	Niagara IceDogs
2	48	Ryder Cali (C)	Canada	Florida Panthers	Penetanguishene, Ontario	North Bay Battalion
2	60	Alexander Bilecki (LD)	Canada	Toronto Maple Leafs	Mississauga, Ontario	Kitchener Rangers
3	72	Adam Nemec (LW)	Slovakia	Ottawa Senators	Liptovský Mikuláš, Slovakia	Sudbury Wolves
3	86	Pierce Mbuyi (LW)	Canada	Pittsburgh Penguins	Mississauga, Ontario	Owen Sound Attack
3	92	Ben Wilmott (C)	United States	Vegas Golden Knights	Long Valley, New Jersey	Barrie Colts
3	94	Alessandro Di Iorio (C)	Canada	Columbus Blue Jackets	Vaughan, Ontario	Sarnia Sting
4	100	Egor Barabanov (C)	Russia	Calgary Flames	Saint Petersburg, Russia	Saginaw Spirit
4	102	Spencer Bowes (LW)	Canada	New York Rangers	Carleton Place, Ontario	Ottawa 67's
4	103	Thomas Vandenberg (C)	Canada	Los Angeles Kings	Nepean, Ontario	Ottawa 67's
4	108	Adam Levac (C)	Canada	Detroit Red Wings	Embrum, Ontario	Peterborough Petes
4	111	Parker von Richter (RD)	Canada	Pittsburgh Penguins	Mississauga, Ontario	Barrie Colts
4	125	Ryder Fetterolf (G)	United States	Carolina Hurricanes	Sewickley, Pennsylvania	Ottawa 67's
5	131	Finn Kearns (LD)	Canada	Seattle Kraken	Aurora, Ontario	Sudbury Wolves
5	133	Andrew Robinson (LD)	Canada	Edmonton Oilers	Oakville, Ontario	Windsor Spitfires
5	141	Vladimír Dravecký (RD)	Czech Republic	New York Islanders	Třinec, Czech Republic	Brantford Bulldogs
5	143	Beckham Edwards (C)	Canada	Detroit Red Wings	Komoka, Ontario	Sarnia Sting
5	146	Eric Frossard (LD)	Canada	Anaheim Ducks	London, Ontario	Guelph Storm
5	150	Carter Stevens (RW)	Canada	St. Louis Blues	Almonte, Ontario	Guelph Storm
5	151	Harris Pangretitsch (RD)	Canada	Ottawa Senators	Toronto, Ontario	Sault Ste. Marie Greyhounds
5	155	Ryan Brown (LW)	Canada	Dallas Stars	Newmarket, Ontario	London Knights
5	157	Jacob Vandeven (LD)	Canada	Boston Bruins	Komoka, Ontario	London Knights
6	162	Andre Mondoux (LD)	Canada	New York Rangers	North Bay, Ontario	Kingston Frontenacs
6	163	Darian Anderson (RW)	United States	New York Rangers	Brighton, Michigan	Flint Firebirds
6	165	Zach Jovanovski (G)	Canada	Carolina Hurricanes	Tecumseh, Ontario	Guelph Storm
6	169	Brody Pepoy (RW)	United States	Toronto Maple Leafs	Clarkston, Michigan	Saginaw Spirit
6	177	Alex Kostov (RW)	Canada	Los Angeles Kings	Mississauga, Ontario	Flint Firebirds
6	180	Caden Harvey (C)	United States	Edmonton Oilers	Beaver, Pennsylvania	Windsor Spitfires
6	181	Cole Zurawski (RW)	Canada	Florida Panthers	Barrie, Ontario	Owen Sound Attack
6	186	Stepan Shurygin (G)	Russia	Tampa Bay Lightning	Samara, Russia	Saginaw Spirit
6	190	Wesley Royston (RW)	Canada	Montreal Canadiens	Oro-Medonte, Ontario	Owen Sound Attack
6	191	Matthew Minchak (G)	United States	Vegas Golden Knights	Cranford, New Jersey	Kingston Frontenacs
7	197	Jasper Kuhta (C)	Finland	Dallas Stars	Helsinki, Finland	Ottawa 67's
7	198	Rylan Singh (RD)	Canada	Seattle Kraken	Pickering, Ontario	Guelph Storm
7	201	Alexander Karmanov (LD)	Moldova	San Jose Sharks	Chișinău, Moldova	North Bay Battalion
7	203	Colin Fitzgerald (C)	Canada	St. Louis Blues	Otonabee–South Monaghan, Ontario	Sault Ste. Marie Greyhounds
7	214	Ondrej Ruml (LD)	Czech Republic	Colorado Avalanche	Boskovice, Czech Republic	Ottawa 67's
7	222	Quinn McKenzie (C)	United States	New Jersey Devils	Cranberry Township, Pennsylvania	Sault Ste. Marie Greyhounds
7	223	Lucas Ambrosio (LD)	Canada	Los Angeles Kings	Oakville, Ontario	Erie Otters

== See also ==
- List of OHL seasons
- 2025–26 QMJHL season
- 2025–26 WHL season

Preceded by 2024–25 OHL season	OHL seasons	Succeeded by 2026–27 OHL season
