= Brantford Bulldogs =

Ontario Hockey League team in Brantford

- City: Brantford, Ontario
- League: Ontario Hockey League
- Conference: Eastern Conference
- Division: East
- Founded: 1981
- Operated: 2023–present
- Home arena: TD Civic Centre
- Colours: Black, gold, white
- General manager: Spencer Hyman
- Head coach: Michael Babcock
- Affiliates: Markham Royals

Franchise history
- 1981–2015: Belleville Bulls
- 2015–2023: Hamilton Bulldogs
- 2023–present: Brantford Bulldogs

Championships
- Division titles: (2018, 2022, 2025, 2026)
- Robertson Cups: (2018, 2022)

Current uniform

The Brantford Bulldogs are a major junior ice hockey team in the Ontario Hockey League (OHL) that began to play in the 2023–24 season. Based in Brantford, Ontario, Canada, the Bulldogs play their home games at TD Civic Centre.

The franchise was founded in 1981 as the Belleville Bulls, playing in Belleville, Ontario for 34 years before being purchased by owner Michael Andlauer in March 2015 and relocated to Hamilton. After playing for eight seasons in Hamilton, Ontario as the Hamilton Bulldogs, the team relocated to Brantford for the 2023–24 OHL season; though the move was initially temporary because of ongoing renovations at FirstOntario Centre, Zach Hyman and family purchased the Bulldogs in January 2025, with the team signing a long-term lease with Brantford and making the relocation permanent.

== History ==
In February 2023, due to upcoming renovations to the FirstOntario Centre, the Hamilton Bulldogs announced they would be temporarily relocating to the Brantford Civic Centre and renaming as the Brantford Bulldogs for at least three seasons, beginning in the 2023–24 season. The Civic Centre will also be undergoing over $9 million in renovations, funded by both the Bulldogs and the City of Brantford.

In January 2025, National Hockey League player Zach Hyman and his family purchased the Bulldogs from Michael Andlauer, and signed a memorandum of understanding with the City of Brantford for the Bulldogs to play at a proposed sports complex in Brantford for 15 years, making the relocation to Brantford permanent.

On May 29, 2026, it was announced that head coach Jay McKee would be leaving the Bulldogs to be the inaugural head coach of the Hamilton Hammers in the American Hockey League. Shortly thereafter, Michael Babcock was introduced as the Bulldogs' new head coach.

== Coaches ==
- 2023–2026, Jay McKee
- 2026–present, Michael Babcock

== General managers ==
- 2023–2025, Matt Turek
- 2025–present, Spencer Hyman

== Players ==
=== Team captains ===
- Lawson Sherk (2023–24)
- Patrick Thomas (2024–25)
- Jake O'Brien (2025–26)

=== Notable players ===
- Adam Benák
- Nick Lardis
- Ryerson Leenders
- Jett Luchanko
- Jake O'Brien
- Marek Vanacker
- Florian Xhekaj

=== NHL first-round draft picks ===
- 2024: Adam Jiříček, 16th overall, St. Louis Blues
- 2024: Marek Vanacker, 27th overall, Chicago Blackhawks
- 2025: Jake O'Brien, 8th overall, Seattle Kraken
- 2026: Caleb Malhotra, 3rd overall, Vancouver Canucks

== Season-by-season results ==
Regular season and playoffs results:

Legend: GP = Games played, W = Wins, L = Losses, T = Ties, OTL = Overtime losses, SL = Shoot-out losses, Pts = Points, GF = Goals for, GA = Goals against

Memorial Cup champions	OHL champions	OHL finalists

Season	Regular season										Playoffs
Season	GP	W	L	OTL	SOL	Pts	Pct	GF	GA	Finish	Playoffs
2023–24	68	37	20	9	2	85	.625	267	243	2nd East	Lost conference quarterfinals (Ottawa 67's) 4–2
2024–25	68	44	19	5	0	93	.684	281	221	1st East	Won conference quarterfinals (North Bay Battalion) 4–1 in Lost conference semifinals (Oshawa Generals) 4–2
2025–26	68	48	10	8	2	106	.779	296	190	1st East	Won conference quarterfinals (Sudbury Wolves) 4–0; Won conference semifinals (North Bay Battalion) 4–0; Lost conference finals (Barrie Colts) 4–3

== See also ==
- List of ice hockey teams in Ontario
