= Nathan Aspinall (ice hockey) =

Canadian ice hockey forward (born 2006)

- Born: March 30, 2006 (age 20) Markham, Ontario, Canada
- Height: 6 ft 7 in (201 cm)
- Weight: 207 lb (94 kg; 14 st 11 lb)
- Position: Right wing
- Shoots: Left
- NHL team (P) Cur. team: New York Rangers; Hartford Wolf Pack (AHL)
- NHL draft: 159th overall, 2024; New York Rangers
- Playing career: 2025–present

Nathan Aspinall (born 30 March 2006) is a Canadian professional ice hockey forward who plays for the Hartford Wolf Pack of the American Hockey League (AHL) as a prospect of the New York Rangers of the National Hockey League (NHL). Aspinall served as the captain of the Flint Firebirds of the Ontario Hockey League for the 2025-26 season. He was drafted by the Rangers in the 5th round of the 2024 NHL entry draft.

== Playing career ==
Aspinall was drafted by the Flint Firebirds in the 2nd round with the 33rd pick of the 2022 Ontario Hockey League Priority Draft. During the 2022-23 season he scored 1 goal and 3 assists in 29 games for Flint. In 2023-24 he improved to 18 goals and 16 assists in 65 games. After the season he was drafted by the Rangers in the 5th round of the NHL entry draft with the 159th overall selection. He scored 17 goals and 30 assists in 62 games for Flint in 2024-24. At the end of the season, he was signed to an amateur try-out contract by the Rangers' AHL affiliate Hartford Wolf Pack, where he went scoreless in 5 games.

For the 2025-26 season, Aspinall was named the Flint captain and dramatically increased his offensive production. This is in part due to improvements in his ability to shoot accurately and powerfully while skating. He finished the season second in the OHL in scoring with 33 goals and 61 assists in 65 games. The 61 assists were a single-season Flint franchise record. He was named the OHL player of the week for the week of 10–16 November after scoring 4 goals and 3 assists in 3 games. In the OHL playoffs, he added another 10 goals and 7 assists in 8 games. Following the first round of the playoffs Aspinall ranked 2nd in the OHL with 13 playoff points, trailing only his teammate and fellow New York Ranger prospect Jacob Battaglia. At the end of the season, Aspinall was a finalist for 2 major OHL awards. He was one of 5 finalists for the Red Tilson Trophy, awarded to the OHL's the most outstanding player (MVP). He was also named as one of 4 finalists for the Mickey Renaud Captain's Trophy, awarded to the "OHL team captain that best exemplifies leadership on and off the ice, with a passion and dedication to the game of hockey and his community." Although he did not win either award, he was named the OHL first all-star team left wing for the season.

Aspinall was signed to a 3 year entry-level contract by the Rangers in October 2025 During Rangers summer development camp in July 2026, Aspinall was joined by his Flint linemates Battaglia and Darian Anderson, who the Rangers drafted in the 2026 NHL entry draft.

He began the 2026-27 season with the Hartford Wolf Pack. He scored his first professional goal for the Wolf Pack in a game against the Wilkes-Barre/Scranton Penguins on 4 October 2026.

== Playing style ==
Aspinall stands at 6 feet, 7 inches tall. He does not rely on finesse playmaking but rather on applying relentless pressure and aggressive puck pursuit. According to Marty Williamson, general manager of the OHL Barrie Colts, "He was kind of gangly early and not as coordinated, (but) he just kept getting better and better." His coach at Flint, Paul Flache, said after the 2025-26 season that "His skill set was always there. He’s a big man, rangy, very good puck skills, very, very good vision — and so you knew over time, he was going to grow into his body...Those summers, you see them go from a boy to a man sometimes. That’s what we noticed, was just when he came to camp, he had grown up and matured, and the confidence grew from year to year."

In March 2026 Scott Wheeler of The Athletic rated Aspinall as the Rangers' 8th best prospect. Wheeler said that he has "great hands and poise for a player his size" and an NHL shot, but "he’s not the big, mean player you’d expect out of a winger that size, and he’s a below-average skater."

Prior to the 2026-27 season, New York Times sportswriters Vincent Z. Mercogliano and Peter Baugh rated Aspinall as the Rangers' 6th best prospect, stating that he "blossomed into a towering, 207-pound force who would often overwhelm OHL defensemen."

== Personal life ==
Aspinall's father is named Paul and his mother is named Valerie. Growing up, Aspinall was a fan of the Toronto Maple Leafs. Growing up, Aspinall also played baseball.

== Career statistics ==
			Regular season					Playoffs
Season	Team	League	GP	G	A	Pts	PIM	GP	G	A	Pts	PIM
2019–20	Markham Waxers U14 AAA	ETAHL U14	36	15	15	30	22	6	3	1	4	0
2021–22	Markham Waxers U16 AAA	ETAHL U16	27	17	22	39	10	8	5	11	16	2
2022–23	Flint Firebirds	OHL	29	1	3	4	2	1	0	0	0	0
2023–24	Flint Firebirds	OHL	65	18	16	34	23	4	1	0	1	0
2024–25	Flint Firebirds	OHL	62	17	30	47	39	5	2	1	3	4
2024–25	Hartford Wolf Pack	AHL	5	0	0	0	0	—	—	—	—	—
2025–26	Flint Firebirds	OHL	65	33	61	94	42	8	10	7	17	2
OHL totals			221	69	110	179	106	18	13	8	21	6

== Awards and honours ==
Award	Year	Ref
OHL
OHL All-Star	2026	
