= Jake O'Brien (ice hockey) =

Canadian ice hockey player (born 2007)

- Born: June 16, 2007 (age 19) Toronto, Ontario, Canada
- Height: 6 ft 2 in (188 cm)
- Weight: 174 lb (79 kg; 12 st 6 lb)
- Position: Centre
- Shoots: Right
- OHL team: Brantford Bulldogs
- NHL draft: 8th overall, 2025; Seattle Kraken

Jake O'Brien (born June 16, 2007) is a Canadian ice hockey player who is a centre and captain of the Brantford Bulldogs in the Ontario Hockey League (OHL). He was selected eighth overall by the Seattle Kraken in the 2025 NHL entry draft.

== Personal life ==
O'Brien was born on June 16, 2007, in Toronto, Ontario, Canada, to Dan O'Brien and Amy Turek. He was born into a hockey playing family as his mother played for the Toronto Aeros while his father played collegiate hockey at Clarkson University.

== Playing career ==
O'Brien started his junior ice hockey journey with the Toronto Jr. Canadiens in the Ontario Junior Hockey League (OJHL). In the 2022–23 season, he captained the team and posted 16 goals and 17 assists over 34 games. At the 2023 OHL Cup, he led the team in scoring with seven goals and ten assists in seven games, setting a new franchise record for points in the tournament. His standout performance earned him the Tim Adams Memorial Trophy as the tournament's Most Valuable Player.

O'Brien was selected eighth overall by the Brantford Bulldogs in the 2023 OHL Draft and officially signed with the team on May 4, 2023. In his rookie campaign during the 2023–24 season, he tallied 13 goals and 51 assists over 61 games, setting new franchise records for assists and total points by a rookie. He led all first-year players in the OHL in points, assists, power-play goals, power-play assists, and points per game. His outstanding performance earned him the Emms Family Award for OHL Rookie of the Year, along with selections to both the CHL All-Rookie Team and the OHL First All-Rookie Team.

On January 9, 2025, O'Brien was appointed as the captain of the Eastern Conference team for the first-ever Connor McDavid OHL Top Prospects Game. He tallied three assists during the game and earned MVP honors for Team East.

== Career statistics ==
Bold indicates led league

| | | | Regular season | | | | | Playoffs |
| Season | Team | League | GP | G | A | Pts | PIM | GP | G | A | Pts | PIM |
|---|---|---|---|---|---|---|---|---|---|---|---|---|
| 2022–23 | Toronto Jr. Canadiens | OJHL | 34 | 16 | 17 | 33 | 6 | — | — | — | — | — |
| 2023–24 | Brantford Bulldogs | OHL | 61 | 13 | 51 | 64 | 10 | 6 | 1 | 4 | 5 | 4 |
| 2024–25 | Brantford Bulldogs | OHL | 66 | 32 | 66 | 98 | 18 | 11 | 3 | 8 | 11 | 6 |
| 2025–26 | Brantford Bulldogs | OHL | 53 | 28 | **65** | 93 | 28 | 15 | 6 | 17 | 23 | 4 |
| OHL totals | | | 180 | 73 | 182 | 255 | 56 | 32 | 10 | 29 | 39 | 14 |

== Awards and honours ==
| Honours | Year | Ref |
CHL
| All-Rookie Team | 2024 | |
OHL
| First All-Rookie Team | 2024 | |
| Emms Family Award | 2024 | |

Awards and achievements
| Preceded by Berkly Catton | Seattle Kraken first-round draft pick 2025 | Succeeded by Chase Reid |
