= List of Seattle Kraken draft picks =

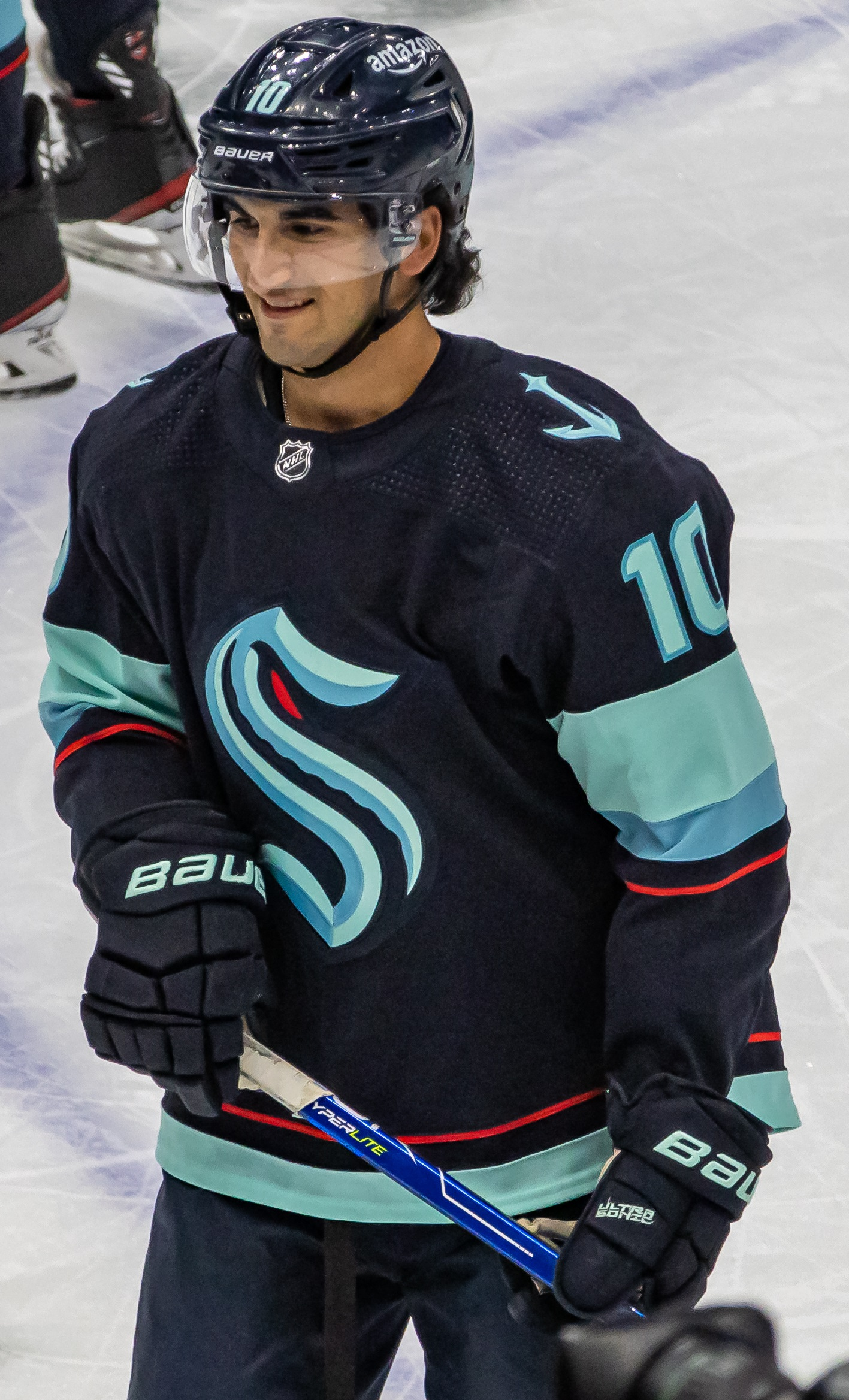
Matty Beniers was the first ever draft selection for the Kraken, taken second overall in 2021.

The Seattle Kraken are a professional ice hockey team based in Seattle. The Kraken compete in the National Hockey League (NHL) as a member of the Pacific Division and began play during the league's 2021–22 season. Since their creation, the Kraken have participated in six drafts and selected 50 players.

The NHL entry draft is held each off-season, allowing teams to select players who have turned 18 years old by September 15 in the year the draft is held. The draft order is determined by the previous season's order of finish, with non-playoff teams drafting first, followed by the teams that made the playoffs, the draft order itself determined by the regular season standings. The NHL holds a weighted lottery for the 16 non-playoff teams, allowing any of the top 11 teams to win the first overall pick. The team with the fewest points has the best chance of winning the lottery, with each successive team given a lower chance of moving up in the draft.

The Kraken's first-ever draft pick was Matty Beniers, taken second overall in the 2021 NHL entry draft. After the 2022–23 season, Beniers won the Calder Memorial Trophy as the league's best rookie after accumulating 24 goals and 33 assists in 80 games. The Kraken's second overall pick in 2021 was the highest they have ever drafted. Nine of the Kraken's draft picks have gone on to play with the Kraken: Beniers, Ryker Evans, Ryan Winterton, Shane Wright, Jani Nyman, Nikke Kokko, Ville Ottavainen, Jacob Melanson, Berkly Catton, and Oscar Fisker Mølgaard.

== Key ==
Key of colors and symbols
Played at least one game with the Kraken.
Spent entire NHL career with the Kraken.

General terms and abbreviations
Term or abbreviation	Definition
Draft	The year that the player was selected
Round	The round of the draft in which the player was selected
Pick	The overall position in the draft at which the player was selected

Position abbreviations
Abbreviation	Definition
G	Goaltender
D	Defense
LW	Left wing
C	Center
RW	Right wing
F	Forward

Abbreviations for statistical columns
Abbreviation	Definition
Pos	Position
GP	Games played
G	Goals
A	Assists
Pts	Points
PIM	Penalties in minutes
W	Wins
L	Losses
OT	Overtime/shootout losses
GAA	Goals against average
—	Does not apply

== Draft picks ==
Statistics are complete as of the 2025–26 NHL season and show each player's career regular season totals in the NHL.

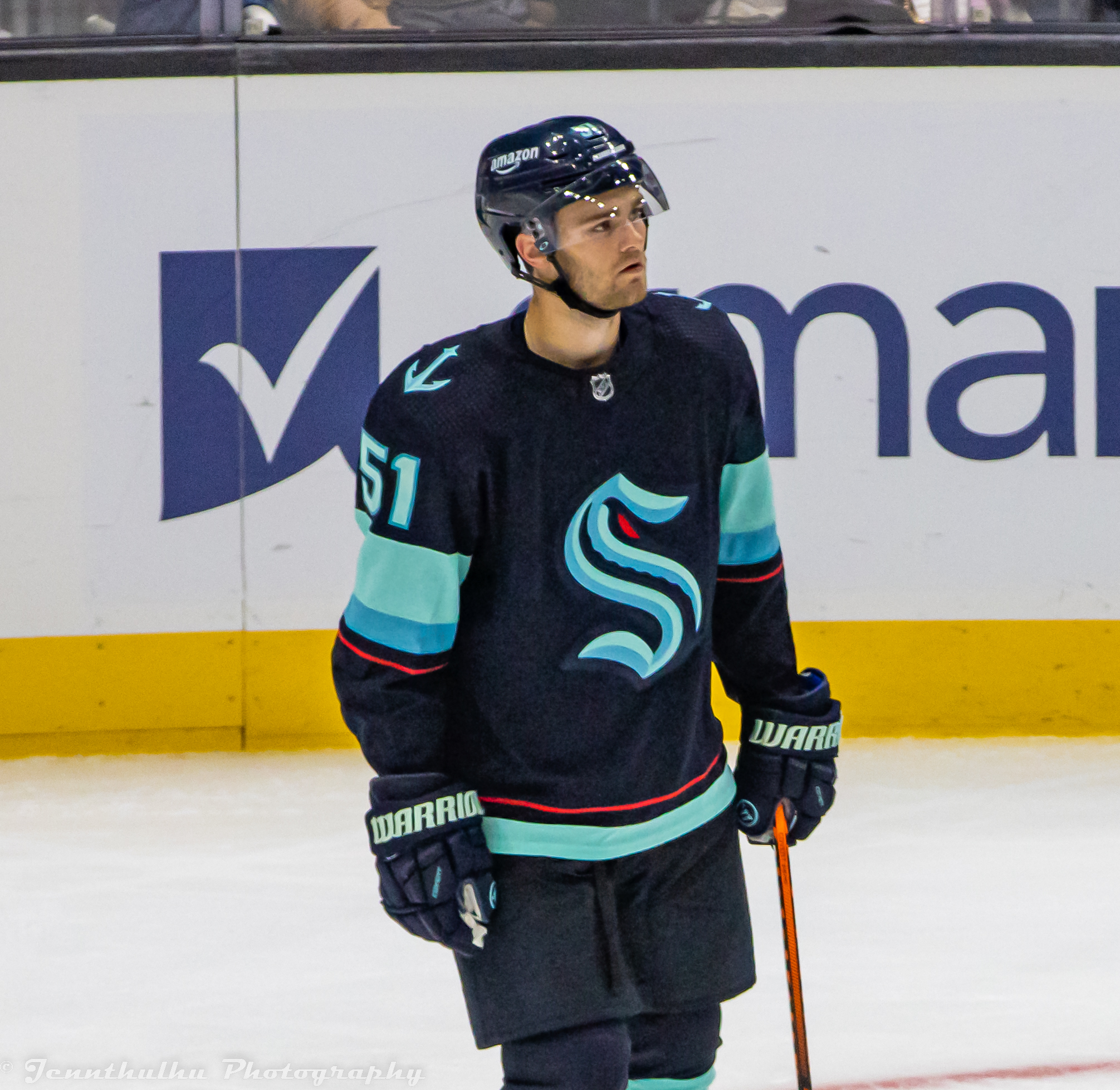
Shane Wright was the Kraken's first selection in 2022, selected fourth overall.

Full list of Seattle Kraken draft picks
Draft	Round	Pick	Player	Nationality	Pos	GP	G	A	Pts	PIM	W	L	OT	GAA
2021	1	2	Matty Beniers	United States	C	331	82	114	196	59	—	—	—	—
2021	2	35	Ryker Evans	Canada	D	176	14	37	51	90	—	—	—	—
2021	3	67	Ryan Winterton	Canada	C	89	4	15	19	17	—	—	—	—
2021	4	99	Ville Ottavainen	Finland	D	1	0	1	1	0	—	—	—	—
2021	5	131	Jacob Melanson	Canada	RW	37	2	3	5	32	—	—	—	—
2021	6	163	Semyon Vyazovoy	Russia	G	—	—	—	—	—	—	—	—	—
2021	7	195	Justin Janicke	United States	LW	—	—	—	—	—	—	—	—	—
2022	1	4	Shane Wright	Canada	C	169	36	42	78	30	—	—	—	—
2022	2	35	Jagger Firkus	Canada	RW	—	—	—	—	—	—	—	—	—
2022	2	49	Jani Nyman	Finland	RW	40	7	6	13	10	—	—	—	—
2022	2	58	Nikke Kokko	Finland	G	4	0	0	0	0	1	2	0	3.17
2022	2	61	David Goyette	Canada	C	—	—	—	—	—	—	—	—	—
2022	3	68	Ty Nelson	Canada	D	—	—	—	—	—	—	—	—	—
2022	3	91	Ben MacDonald	United States	C	—	—	—	—	—	—	—	—	—
2022	4	100	Tyson Jugnauth	Canada	D	—	—	—	—	—	—	—	—	—
2022	4	123	Tucker Robertson	Canada	C	—	—	—	—	—	—	—	—	—
2022	6	164	Barrett Hall	United States	C	—	—	—	—	—	—	—	—	—
2022	7	196	Kyle Jackson	Canada	C	—	—	—	—	—	—	—	—	—
2023	1	20	Eduard Šalé	Czech Republic	LW	—	—	—	—	—	—	—	—	—
2023	2	50	Carson Rehkopf	Canada	LW	—	—	—	—	—	—	—	—	—
2023	2	52	Oscar Fisker Mølgaard	Denmark	C	13	0	2	2	2	—	—	—	—
2023	2	57	Lukas Dragicevic	Canada	D	—	—	—	—	—	—	—	—	—
2023	3	84	Caden Price	Canada	D	—	—	—	—	—	—	—	—	—
2023	4	116	Andrei Loshko	Belarus	C	—	—	—	—	—	—	—	—	—
2023	5	148	Kaden Hammell	Canada	D	—	—	—	—	—	—	—	—	—
2023	6	168	Visa Vedenpää	Finland	G	—	—	—	—	—	—	—	—	—
2023	6	180	Zeb Forsfjäll	Sweden	C	—	—	—	—	—	—	—	—	—
2023	7	212	Zaccharya Wisdom	Canada	RW	—	—	—	—	—	—	—	—	—
2024	1	8	Berkly Catton	Canada	C	66	7	10	17	31	—	—	—	—
2024	2	40	Julius Miettinen	Finland	C	—	—	—	—	—	—	—	—	—
2024	2	63	Nathan Villeneuve	Canada	C	—	—	—	—	—	—	—	—	—
2024	3	73	Alexis Bernier	Canada	D	—	—	—	—	—	—	—	—	—
2024	3	88	Kim Saarinen	Finland	G	—	—	—	—	—	—	—	—	—
2024	4	105	Ollie Josephson	Canada	C	—	—	—	—	—	—	—	—	—
2024	5	141	Clarke Caswell	Canada	LW	—	—	—	—	—	—	—	—	—
2024	7	202	Jakub Fibigr	Czechia	D	—	—	—	—	—	—	—	—	—
2025	1	8	Jake O'Brien	Canada	C	—	—	—	—	—	—	—	—	—
2025	2	36	Blake Fiddler	United States	D	—	—	—	—	—	—	—	—	—
2025	3	68	Will Reynolds	Canada	D	—	—	—	—	—	—	—	—	—
2025	5	134	Maxim Agafanov	Russia	D	—	—	—	—	—	—	—	—	—
2025	7	205	Karl Annborn	Sweden	D	—	—	—	—	—	—	—	—	—
2025	7	218	Loke Krantz	Sweden	RW	—	—	—	—	—	—	—	—	—
2026	1	7	Chase Reid	United States	D	—	—	—	—	—	—	—	—	—
2026	2	38	Casey Mutryn	United States	RW	—	—	—	—	—	—	—	—	—
2026	4	99	Viktor Fyodorov	Russia	C	—	—	—	—	—	—	—	—	—
2026	5	131	Finn Kearns	Canada	D	—	—	—	—	—	—	—	—	—
2026	5	148	Hawke Huff	United States	D	—	—	—	—	—	—	—	—	—
2026	6	166	Ola Palme	Sweden	D	—	—	—	—	—	—	—	—	—
2026	7	198	Rylan Singh	Canada	D	—	—	—	—	—	—	—	—	—
2026	7	204	William Tomko	United States	C	—	—	—	—	—	—	—	—	—

== See also ==
- 2021 NHL expansion draft
