= Kashawn Aitcheson =

Canadian ice hockey player (born 2006)

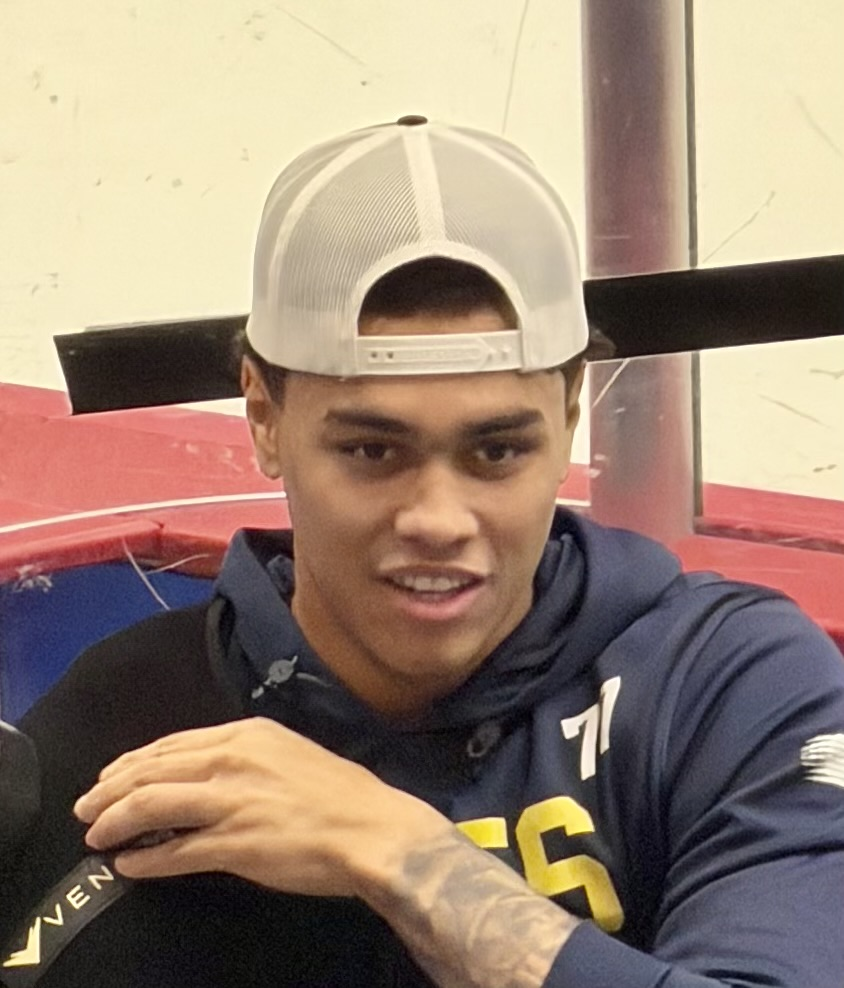
- Aitcheson with the Barrie Colts in 2025
- Born: September 21, 2006 (age 20) Toronto, Ontario, Canada
- Height: 6 ft 2 in (188 cm)
- Weight: 200 lb (91 kg; 14 st 4 lb)
- Position: Defence
- Shoots: Left
- NHL team (P) Cur. team: New York Islanders; Hamilton Hammers (AHL)
- NHL draft: 17th overall, 2025; New York Islanders
- Playing career: 2026–present

Kashawn Aitcheson (born September 21, 2006) is a Canadian professional ice hockey player who is a defenceman for the Hamilton Hammers of the American Hockey League (AHL) while under contract to the New York Islanders of the National Hockey League (NHL). He was drafted 17th overall by the Islanders in the 2025 NHL entry draft.

== Early life ==
Aitcheson was raised on the east side of Scarborough, Ontario, spending much of his childhood living near Ted Reeve Community Arena where he played minor hockey. His parents divorced when he was eight years old, and he helped raise his younger brother. Aitcheson credits his family, especially his grandparents and his uncle who played Junior A and NCAA Division III hockey, for supporting his hockey career. His father is from Jamaica; Aitcheson has said he looks up to players who have "paved the path for our generation, to push Black hockey and change the culture in hockey as well".

== Playing career ==
On August 31, 2022, Aitcheson signed with the Barrie Colts of the OHL. During the 2022–23 season, he recorded one goal and two assists in 23 games. During the 2023–24 season, he recorded eight goals and 31 assists in 64 regular season games. During the playoffs he recorded one goal and three assists in six games. On January 18, 2024, after he legally body-checked a Sudbury Wolves player, Aitcheson fought with another Wolves player. Following the game, members of the Wolves' team group chat wrote about rewarding a bounty to the player who injured Aitcheson in the next Barrie–Sudbury match. An OHL investigation resulted in the suspensions of two Wolves players for 10 and 15 games, and the Colts chose not to play Aitcheson against the Wolves for the remainder of the season.

During the 2024–25 season, Aitcheson recorded 26 goals and 33 assists in 64 regular season games. On October 22, 2024, he was selected to the CHL/USA Prospects Challenge. On March 15, 2025, he scored his 24th goal of the season, setting a single-season franchise record for goals by a defenceman, and surpassing the previous record held jointly by Andrew Marshall, Aaron Ekblad and Brandt Clarke. In recognition of his play, Aitcheson was named to the OHL's Second All-Star Team.

On March 17, 2026, Aitcheson signed a three-year, entry-level contract with the New York Islanders.

== International play ==
Medal record

Men's ice hockey

Representing Canada

World Junior Championships
Bronze medal – third place	2026 United States	

World U18 Championships
Gold medal – first place	2024 Finland	

On April 16, 2024, Aitcheson was selected to represent the Canada under-18 team at the 2024 World U18 Championships. During the tournament he recorded one goal and two assists in seven games and won a gold medal.

In December 2025, he was selected to represent the junior team at the 2026 World Junior Championships. During the tournament he recorded one goal and three assists in seven games and won a bronze medal.

== Career statistics ==
=== Regular season and playoffs ===
Bold indicates led league

			Regular season					Playoffs
Season	Team	League	GP	G	A	Pts	PIM	GP	G	A	Pts	PIM
2022–23	Barrie Colts	OHL	23	1	2	3	35	4	0	0	0	7
2023–24	Barrie Colts	OHL	64	8	31	39	126	6	1	3	4	17
2024–25	Barrie Colts	OHL	64	26	33	59	88	16	6	6	12	28
2025–26	Barrie Colts	OHL	56	28	42	70	97	19	8	**19**	27	25
OHL totals			207	63	108	171	346	45	15	28	43	77

=== International ===
Year	Team	Event	Result	GP	G	A	Pts	PIM
2024	Canada	U18	1st place, gold medalist(s)	7	1	2	3	2
2026	Canada	WJC	3rd place, bronze medalist(s)	7	1	3	4	0
Junior totals				20	9	11	20	41

== Awards and honours ==
Award	Year	Ref
OHL
Second All-Star Team	2025	

Awards and achievements
Preceded by Victor Eklund	New York Islanders first round pick 2025	Succeeded by Malte Gustafsson
