= Marek Vanacker =

Canadian ice hockey player (born 2006)

- Born: April 12, 2006 (age 20) Langton, Ontario, Canada
- Height: 6 ft 1 in (185 cm)
- Weight: 174 lb (79 kg; 12 st 6 lb)
- Position: Left wing
- Shoots: Left
- NHL team (P) Cur. team: Chicago Blackhawks; Rockford IceHogs (AHL)
- NHL draft: 27th overall, 2024; Chicago Blackhawks
- Playing career: 2026–present

Marek Vanacker (born April 12, 2006) is a Canadian professional ice hockey player who is a left winger for the Rockford IceHogs of the American Hockey League (AHL) as a prospect to the Chicago Blackhawks of the National Hockey League (NHL). He was selected 27th overall by the Blackhawks in the 2024 NHL entry draft.

== Playing career ==
On April 20, 2022, Vanacker was selected 23rd overall by the Hamilton Bulldogs in the 2022 OHL Draft and signed with the team on May 21, 2022. In his rookie 2022–23 season, he tallied four goals and 12 assists over 55 games with the Brantford Bulldogs. The following year, 2023–24, he enjoyed a breakout season, posting 36 goals, 46 assists, 22 power‑play points, and five shorthanded goals in 68 regular‑season games. He finished as the team's leader in both goals and total points and ranked second in assists. In the playoffs, he added three goals and four assists across six games.

On June 28, 2024, Vanacker's strong junior performance and offensive upside led to him being selected 27th overall by the Chicago Blackhawks in the first round of the 2024 NHL entry draft. After several weeks of evaluation and negotiations, the Blackhawks officially signed him on August 5, 2024, to a standard three‑year entry‑level contract.

== International play ==
Medal record

Representing Canada

Men's ice hockey

World U18 Championships
| Gold medal – first place | 2024 Finland | |

On April 16, 2024, Vanacker earned the honour of being selected to join Canada's under-18 national team for the prestigious 2024 IIHF World U18 Championships. Throughout the tournament, he contributed one goal in six games, demonstrating his skill and versatility as a forward. More importantly, Vanacker's consistent play helped Canada navigate through tough competition, culminating in the team winning the gold medal.

== Career statistics ==
Bold indicates led league

=== Regular season and playoffs ===
| | | | Regular season | | | | | Playoffs |
| Season | Team | League | GP | G | A | Pts | PIM | GP | G | A | Pts | PIM |
|---|---|---|---|---|---|---|---|---|---|---|---|---|
| 2021–22 | Brantford 99ers | OJHL | 2 | 0 | 1 | 1 | 0 | — | — | — | — | — |
| 2022–23 | Hamilton Bulldogs | OHL | 55 | 4 | 12 | 16 | 20 | 6 | 0 | 0 | 0 | 0 |
| 2023–24 | Brantford Bulldogs | OHL | 68 | 36 | 46 | 82 | 55 | 6 | 3 | 4 | 7 | 2 |
| 2024–25 | Brantford Bulldogs | OHL | 45 | 24 | 18 | 42 | 36 | 11 | 6 | 5 | 11 | 8 |
| 2025–26 | Brantford Bulldogs | OHL | 60 | **47** | 35 | 82 | 33 | 15 | 8 | 10 | 18 | 12 |
| OHL totals | | | 228 | 111 | 111 | 222 | 144 | 38 | 17 | 19 | 36 | 22 |

=== International ===
| Year | Team | Event | Result | GP | G | A | Pts | PIM |
|---|---|---|---|---|---|---|---|---|
| 2022 | Canada Black | U17 | 4th | 7 | 0 | 3 | 3 | 2 |
| 2024 | Canada | U18 | 1st place, gold medalist(s) | 6 | 1 | 0 | 1 | 2 |
| Junior totals | | | | 13 | 1 | 3 | 4 | 4 |

Awards and achievements
| Preceded by Sacha Boisvert | Chicago Blawkhawks first-round draft pick 2024 | Succeeded by Anton Frondell |
