= Jim Gregory Award =

Annual hocky award in Ontario, US

- Sport: Ice hockey
- Awarded for: OHL General Manager of the Year

History
- First award: 2020
- Most recent: Dave McParlan

The Jim Gregory Award is awarded annually to the Ontario Hockey League General Manager of the Year. The award is selected by a combination of the league's general managers and a five-member panel of OHL writers, broadcasters and NHL central scouting. The award is named for Jim Gregory, who served as the director of the NHL central scouting service.

== Winners ==
List of winners of the Jim Gregory Award.

Season	Coach	Team
2019–20	James Boyd	Ottawa 67's
2020–21	Not awarded, season cancelled due to COVID-19 pandemic	
2021–22	Steve Staios	Hamilton Bulldogs
2022–23	Mark Hunter	London Knights
2023–24	Adam Dennis	North Bay Battalion
2024–25	Kory Cooper	Kingston Frontenacs
2025–26	Dave McParlan	Flint Firebirds

== See also ==
- List of Canadian Hockey League awards
