= Ryerson Leenders =

Canadian ice hockey player (born 2006)

- Born: June 1, 2006 (age 20) Nanticoke, Ontario, Canada
- Height: 6 ft 2 in (188 cm)
- Weight: 179 lb (81 kg; 12 st 11 lb)
- Position: Goaltender
- Catches: Left
- OHL team: Owen Sound Attack
- NHL draft: 219th overall, 2024; Buffalo Sabres

Ryerson Leenders (born June 1, 2006) is a Canadian junior ice hockey player who is a goaltender for the Owen Sound Attack of the Ontario Hockey League (OHL). He was selected 219th overall by the Buffalo Sabres in the 2024 NHL entry draft.

== Playing career ==
Leenders was selected in the second round, 32nd overall, in the 2022 Ontario Hockey League (OHL) priority draft by the Mississauga Steelheads. He made his OHL debut in the 2022–23 season, posting his first win on October 16, 2022, against the Sarnia Sting. In that year's playoffs, he established himself as their starting goalie, but he and the Steelheads were eliminated in game 6 of the first round against the North Bay Battalion.

In the 2023–24 season, Leenders recorded his first career shutout, against the Erie Otters on September 29, 2023. He was later chosen as a top draft-eligible prospect to attend the 2024 CHL/NHL Top Prospects Game, where he made 19 saves on 20 shots. After finishing the season with 24 wins, a .909 save percentage, and three shutouts, Leenders was injured early the playoffs, playing only two games in a first round exit at the hands of the Sudbury Wolves. Entering the 2024 NHL entry draft, his positioning, reflexes, and movement, as well as his success on a team with a struggling defence group, were among the qualities that led some scouts to project him as a first-round pick. He would be selected in the seventh round, 219th overall by the Buffalo Sabres, their final pick of the draft.

On August 29, 2024, Leenders was traded from the Steelheads to the Brantford Bulldogs in exchange for eight draft picks, including three in the second round.

On June 2, 2026, Leenders was traded from the Bulldogs, along with a draft pick, to the Owen Sound Attack in exchange for defenseman Jet Kwajah, a 2026 fifth-round pick and two conditional 2027 draft picks: one in the second round and one in the fourth round.

== International play ==
Medal record

Representing Canada

Men's ice hockey

World U18 Championships
Gold medal – first place	2024 Finland	

Hlinka Gretzky Cup
Gold medal – first place	2023 Czechia/Slovakia	

Leenders played for Team Canada Black at the 2022 World U-17 Hockey Challenge.

At the 2023 Hlinka Gretzky Cup, Leenders won gold with Team Canada, but as their third string goaltender he did not see any ice time.

Leenders represented Canada at the 2024 IIHF World U18 Championships. In his lone start at the event, a 7–1 victory over Switzerland, he made 25 saves on 26 shots.

== Career statistics ==
=== Regular season and playoffs ===
			Regular season									Playoffs
Season	Team	League	GP	W	L	OTL	MIN	GA	SO	GAA	SV%	GP	W	L	MIN	GA	SO	GAA	SV%
2022–23	Mississauga Steelheads	OHL	35	12	15	3	1,877	109	0	3.48	.879	6	2	4	337	22	0	3.92	.861
2023–24	Mississauga Steelheads	OHL	46	24	17	4	2,672	139	3	3.12	.909	2	0	1	88	3	0	2.07	.933
2024–25	Brantford Bulldogs	OHL	48	31	14	3	2,819	146	1	3.11	.910	8	4	3	442	20	1	2.71	.911
2025–26	Brantford Bulldogs	OHL	39	27	5	6	2,249	101	2	2.69	.910	14	10	4	895	36	1	2.41	.906
OHL totals			168	94	51	16	9,617	495	6	3.09	.904	30	16	12	1,761	81	2	2.76	.900

=== International ===
Year	Team	Event	Result	GP	W	L	T	MIN	GA	SO	GAA	SV%
2022	Canada Black	U17	4th	3	0	3	0	172	15	0	5.23	.847
2024	Canada	U18	1st place, gold medalist(s)	1	1	0	0	60	1	0	1.00	.963
Junior totals				4	1	3	0	232	16	0
