= Chase Reid =

American ice hockey player (born 2007)

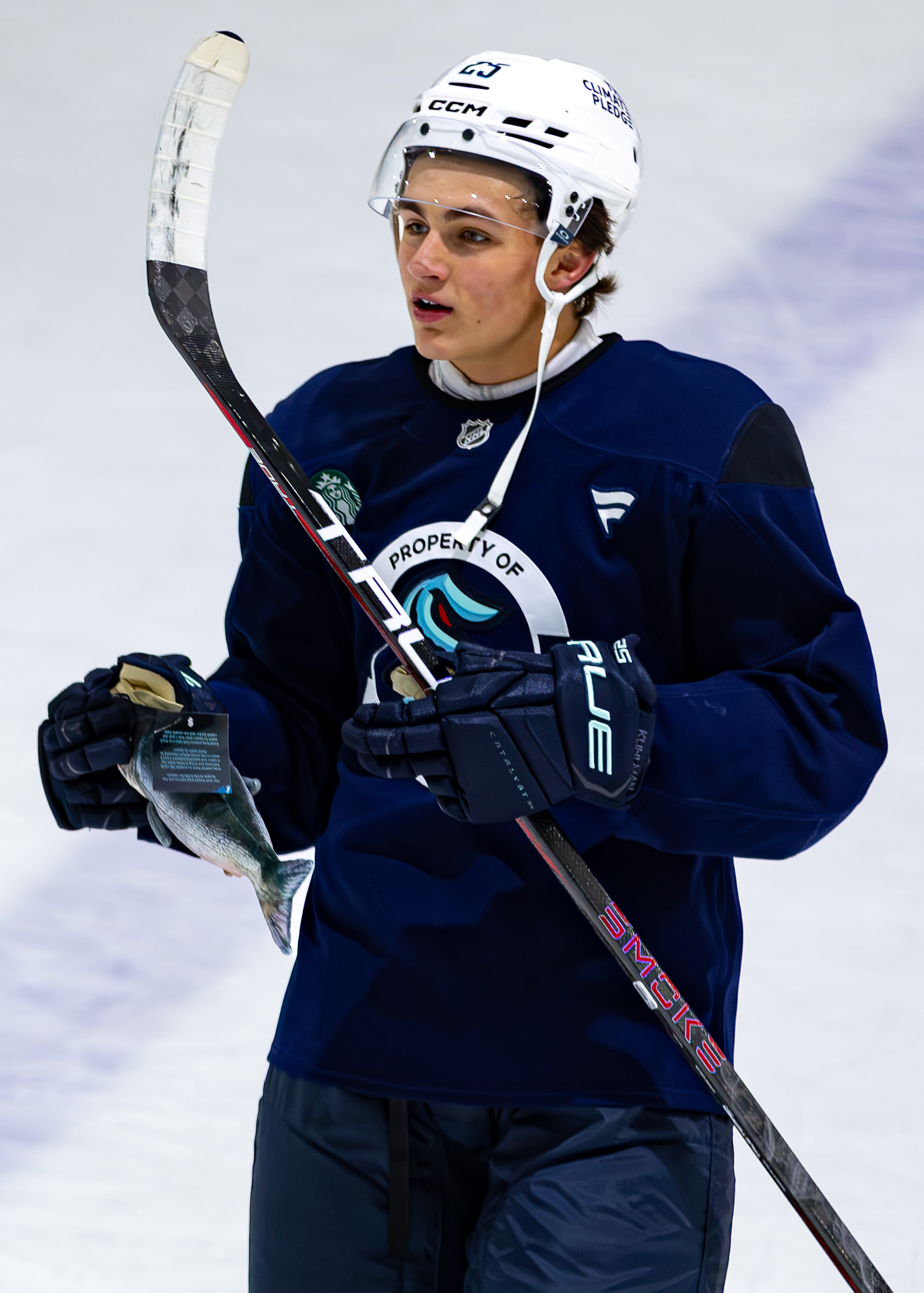
- Chase Reid with the Seattle Kraken on July 2, 2026
- Born: December 30, 2007 (age 18) Chesterfield, Michigan, U.S.
- Height: 6 ft 2 in (188 cm)
- Weight: 195 lb (88 kg; 13 st 13 lb)
- Position: Defense
- Shoots: Right
- NCAA team: Michigan State University
- NHL draft: 7th overall, 2026; Seattle Kraken

Chase Reid (born December 30, 2007) is an American college ice hockey player who is a defenseman for Michigan State University of the National Collegiate Athletic Association (NCAA) as a prospect to the Seattle Kraken of the National Hockey League (NHL). He was drafted seventh overall by the Seattle Kraken in the 2026 NHL entry draft.

== Playing career ==
Reid initially played ice hockey as a forward before being convinced by his father to switch to defenseman when he joined the Honeybaked U13 AAA team. He played for the Victory Honda AAA program from 2021 to 2024, starting with the U14 squad before rising to the U16 team by the 2023–24 season. He scored four points in eight games with the U14 team in 2021–22 and 34 points in 63 games for the U15 team in 2022–23. In 2023–24, he tallied 14 goals and 48 assists in 68 games with the Victory Honda U16 team.

Reid was selected by the Sault Ste. Marie Greyhounds in the seventh round (125th overall) of the 2023 Ontario Hockey League (OHL) draft. At the end of the 2023–24 season, he appeared in 10 games for the Waterloo Black Hawks of the United States Hockey League (USHL). In August 2024, he committed to play college ice hockey for the Michigan State Spartans. Reid planned to play for the Black Hawks in the 2024–25 season, but was inactive for the first few games. He later joined the Bismarck Bobcats of the North American Hockey League (NAHL). He appeared in 18 games there and scored six goals and 12 points.

In December 2024, Reid obtained a release from USA Hockey and joined the Sault Ste. Marie Greyhounds, making his debut shortly afterwards. He was named the OHL Rookie of the Month and to the Canadian Hockey League (CHL) Team of the Month in January 2025, when he posted 19 points in 12 games. He finished the 2024–25 season having scored seven goals and 33 assists in 39 games with the Greyhounds.

Reid committed to playing for Michigan State University on August 1st, 2024. Reid is set to join the team for the 2026-27 season.

Reid was regarded as a top prospect eligible for the 2026 NHL entry draft, and was ultimately selected seventh overall by the Seattle Kraken.

== International play ==
Reid participated at the 2025 CHL USA Prospects Challenge. In December 2025, he was named to the preliminary roster of the United States junior national team for the 2026 World Junior Ice Hockey Championships.

On December 24 2025, Reid was named to the United States men's national junior ice hockey team to compete at the 2026 World Junior Ice Hockey Championships. During the tournament he recorded two goals and two assists in five games, and was eliminated in the quarterfinals by Finland.

== Personal life ==
Reid was born on December 30, 2007, in Chesterfield, Michigan. His father, RJ, and brother, Blake, also each played hockey.

== Career statistics ==
			Regular season					Playoffs
Season	Team	League	GP	G	A	Pts	PIM	GP	G	A	Pts	PIM
2023–24	Waterloo Black Hawks	USHL	10	0	0	0	0	—	—	—	—	—
2024–25	Bismarck Bobcats	NAHL	18	6	6	12	12	—	—	—	—	—
2024–25	Sault Ste. Marie Greyhounds	OHL	39	7	33	40	32	5	0	3	3	2
2025–26	Sault Ste. Marie Greyhounds	OHL	45	18	30	48	30	10	3	3	6	10
OHL totals			84	25	63	88	62	15	3	6	9	12

=== International ===
Year	Team	Event	Result	GP	G	A	Pts	PIM
2026	United States	WJC	5th	5	2	2	4	4
Junior totals				5	2	2	4	4

Awards and achievements
Preceded by Jake O'Brien	Seattle Kraken first-round draft pick 2026	Succeeded by Incumbent
