= Caleb Malhotra =

Canadian ice hockey player (born 2008)

- Born: June 2, 2008 (age 18) Victoria, British Columbia, Canada
- Height: 6 ft 2 in (188 cm)
- Weight: 182 lb (83 kg; 13 st 0 lb)
- Position: Centre
- Shoots: Left
- NCAA team: Boston University
- NHL draft: 3rd overall, 2026; Vancouver Canucks

Caleb Malhotra (born June 2, 2008) is a Canadian junior ice hockey player who is a centre for the Boston University Terriers of the NCAA as a prospect to the Vancouver Canucks of the National Hockey League (NHL). He was drafted third overall by the Canucks in the 2026 NHL entry draft.

== Playing career ==
On April 11, 2024, Malhotra was drafted eighth overall by the Kingston Frontenacs in the 2024 OHL Priority Selection. He elected to skip Frontenacs' training camp and report to the Chilliwack Chiefs of the British Columbia Hockey League (BCHL). On September 12, he was traded to the Brantford Bulldogs. During the 2024–25 season he recorded eight goals and 18 assists in 44 regular season games, and five goals and 12 assists in 21 playoff games for the Chiefs.

He then joined the Brantford Bulldogs of the Ontario Hockey League (OHL) for the 2025–26 season. On November 12, 2025, he was named captain for team CHL in the CHL USA Prospects Challenge. During his rookie season, he recorded 29 goals and 55 assists in 67 regular season games and 13 goals and 13 assists in 15 playoff games. His 84 points ranked second on the team, while his 26 playoff points led all Brantford players. Additionally, he ranked second among all OHL rookies in goals, assists and points during the regular season.

On June 26, 2026, Malhotra was drafted third overall by the Vancouver Canucks in the 2026 NHL entry draft.

Malhotra is committed to play college ice hockey at Boston University during the 2026–27 season.

== Personal life ==
Malhotra is the son of former ice hockey player Manny Malhotra who played 991 career NHL games in 16 seasons. His mother Joann was a soccer star at the University of Victoria, his uncle Martin Nash was a professional footballer who won a CONCACAF championship with Canada, while his other uncle Steve Nash was a National Basketball Association (NBA) player and represented Canada at the 2000 Summer Olympics.

== Career statistics ==
			Regular season					Playoffs
Season	Team	League	GP	G	A	Pts	PIM	GP	G	A	Pts	PIM
2024–25	Chilliwack Chiefs	BCHL	44	8	18	26	23	21	5	12	17	13
2025–26	Brantford Bulldogs	OHL	67	29	55	84	51	15	13	13	26	4
OHL totals			67	29	55	84	51	15	13	13	26	4

Awards and achievements
Preceded by Braeden Cootes	Vancouver Canucks first-round draft pick 2026	Succeeded by Adam Novotný
