= Andong Song =

Chinese collegiate ice hockey player (born 1997)

- Born: January 31, 1997 (age 29) Beijing, China
- Height: 6 ft 1 in (185 cm)
- Weight: 177 lb (80 kg; 12 st 9 lb)
- Position: Defence
- Shot: Left
- NHL draft: 172nd overall, 2015; New York Islanders
- Playing career: 2018–2021

Andong Song
- Traditional Chinese: 宋安東
- Simplified Chinese: 宋安东
Transcriptions
Standard Mandarin
- Hanyu Pinyin: Sòng Āndōng

Andong Song (Chinese: 宋安東; born January 31, 1997), also known as Misha Song, is a Chinese former ice hockey player. Song is notable for being the first mainland Chinese-born hockey player to be drafted in the National Hockey League (NHL). Song was drafted in the sixth round, 172nd overall in the 2015 NHL entry draft by the New York Islanders. Further Chinese-born players selected in the NHL Draft include Kevin He in 2024 and Haoxi Wang in 2025.

== Early and personal life ==
Song was born in Beijing, the son of Yu Song and Bei Gao, before moving to Oakville, Ontario at age 10, and he became a fan of the Ottawa Senators.

== Playing career ==
As a child, Song played in the Beijing International Ice Hockey League (BIIHL) minor league. When selected by the Islanders in the 2015 NHL entry draft, Song played for the Lawrenceville School in New Jersey followed by a postgraduate year at Phillips Academy, Andover in Massachusetts.

He played two seasons in the United States Hockey League (USHL) with the Madison Capitols after he was selected 160th overall in the 2016 USHL Entry Draft by the club before committing to play collegiate hockey at Cornell University of the ECAC from the 2018–19 season.

== International play ==
Song has represented China internationally for the Chinese national team at the 2014 IIHF World U18 Championships, Division II-B, and as a captain for the 2015 competition. In July 2020, Song participated in a training camp for the Chinese Olympic team, but was ultimately not included in the final roster for the 2022 Winter Olympics.

== Career statistics ==
=== Regular season and playoffs ===
			Regular season					Playoffs
Season	Team	League	GP	G	A	Pts	PIM	GP	G	A	Pts	PIM
2012–13	Lawrenceville School	USHS	24	3	5	8	14	—	—	—	—	—
2013–14	Lawrenceville School	USHS	17	0	7	7	4	—	—	—	—	—
2014–15	Lawrenceville School	USHS	26	3	7	10	8	—	—	—	—	—
2015–16	Phillips Andover	USHS	27	1	7	8	4	—	—	—	—	—
2016–17	Madison Capitols	USHL	52	0	2	2	8	—	—	—	—	—
2017–18	Madison Capitols	USHL	48	1	0	1	6	—	—	—	—	—
USHL totals			100	1	2	3	14	—	—	—	—	—

=== International ===
Year	Team	Event	Result	GP	G	A	Pts	PIM
2014	China	WJC18-D2	33rd	5	0	0	0	2
2015	China	WJC18-D2	33rd	5	0	2	2	16
Junior totals				10	0	2	2	18

== See also ==
- Larry Kwong, Canadian-born Cantonese ethnicity NHL player for one season with the late-1940s New York Rangers.
