= Ryerson Edgar =

Canadian ice hockey player (born 2009)

- Born: July 30, 2009 (age 17) Holland Landing, Ontario, Canada
- Height: 5 ft 11 in (180 cm)
- Weight: 170 lb (77 kg; 12 st 2 lb)
- Position: Forward
- Shoots: Right
- OHL team: Niagara IceDogs
- NHL draft: Eligible 2027

Ryerson Edgar (born July 30, 2009) is a Canadian junior ice hockey player for the Niagara IceDogs of the Ontario Hockey League (OHL) He is considered a top prospect eligible for the 2027 NHL entry draft.

== Playing career ==
Edgar was drafted 10th overall by the Niagara IceDogs in the 2025 OHL Priority Selection Draft. On July 16, 2025, he signed with the IccDogs. During the 2025–26 season, he recorded 23 goals and 26 assists in 62 regular season games, and finished as the highest-scoring 2009-born player in the league. He recorded his first career hat-trick in his second career OHL game. Following the season he was named to the OHL Second All-Rookie Team.

On February 10, 2026, he committed to play college ice hockey at Michigan.

== International play ==
On October 15, 2025, he was selected to represent Canada Red at the 2025 World U-17 Hockey Challenge where he recorded one goal and two assists in five games and won a gold medal.

On July 31, 2026, he was selected to represent Canada at the 2026 Hlinka Gretzky Cup. During the tournament he recorded three goals and two assists in five games and won a gold medal.

== Career statistics ==
=== Regular season and playoffs ===
			Regular season					Playoffs
Season	Team	League	GP	G	A	Pts	PIM	GP	G	A	Pts	PIM
2024–25	Collingwood Blues	OJHL	3	1	1	2	0	—	—	—	—	—
2025–26	Niagara IceDogs	OHL	64	23	26	49	18	5	1	1	2	0
OHL totals			64	23	26	49	18	5	1	1	2	0

=== International ===
Year	Team	Event	Result	GP	G	A	Pts	PIM
2026	Canada	HG18	1st place, gold medalist(s)	5	3	2	5	0
Junior totals				5	3	2	5	0
