= Kevin He =

Chinese ice hockey player (born 2006)

- Born: April 30, 2006 (age 20) Beijing, China
- Height: 5 ft 11 in (180 cm)
- Weight: 182 lb (83 kg; 13 st 0 lb)
- Position: Left wing
- Shoots: Left
- NHL team (P) Cur. team: Winnipeg Jets; Manitoba Moose (AHL)
- NHL draft: 109th overall, 2024; Winnipeg Jets
- Playing career: 2026–present

Kevin Hongtian He (born April 30, 2006) is a Chinese-born Canadian ice hockey left wing of the Manitoba Moose of the American Hockey League (AHL) while under contract as a prospect to The Winnipeg Jets of the National Hockey League (NHL). The Jets selected He with the 109th overall pick in the 2024 NHL entry draft. In 2024, He became the first Chinese-born ice hockey player to sign an NHL contract.

== Early life ==
He was born in Beijing, China. His father Jason had become interested in ice hockey while attending Université de Moncton and took him rollerblading and ice skating as a child. He began playing organized ice hockey at the age of six, when his family moved to Montreal. He played minor ice hockey for a variety of teams across Montreal and Toronto before joining the North York Rangers of the Greater Toronto Hockey League. During the 2021–22 season with North York's Under-16 AAA team, He had 13 goals and 25 points in 16 games.

== Playing career ==
The Niagara IceDogs of the Ontario Hockey League (OHL) selected He in the second round, with the 25th overall pick, of the 2022 OHL Priority Selection, and he signed with the team that May. He's first junior ice hockey goal came on October 1, during the IceDogs' 3–2 victory over the Flint Firebirds. In his rookie OHL season, He had 34 points in 66 games, and his 21 goals tied Akil Thomas for the most by an IceDog in their 16-year-old season. During the 2023–24 season, He served as one of six alternate captains for the IceDogs. In 64 games that season, He recorded 53 points, including a team-leading 31 goals, and was the IceDogs' nominee for the Red Tilson Trophy.

The Winnipeg Jets of the National Hockey League (NHL) selected He in the fourth round, 109th overall, of the 2024 NHL entry draft. He was only the second Chinese-born player drafted in the NHL, behind Andong Song, who the New York Islanders took in the sixth round of the 2015 NHL entry draft. Kevin He's draft position was surpassed a year later by Haoxi Wang, who was selected 33rd overall by the San Jose Sharks in the 2025 NHL entry draft.

On December 17, 2024, the Jets signed He to a three-year, entry-level contract, making him the first Chinese-born player to sign in the NHL.

On December 28, 2025, the IceDogs traded He, two draft picks, and the rights to Darcy Dewatcher to the Flint Firebirds in exchange for Chase Hull and seven draft picks. At the time of the trade, He had 14 goals and 31 points in 28 games.

On April 23, 2026, He was transferred from the Flint Firebirds of the Ontario Hockey League (OHL) to the Manitoba Moose.

== Career statistics ==
			Regular season					Playoffs
Season	Team	League	GP	G	A	Pts	PIM	GP	G	A	Pts	PIM
2022–23	Niagara IceDogs	OHL	66	21	13	34	31	—	—	—	—	—
2023–24	Niagara IceDogs	OHL	64	31	22	53	66	—	—	—	—	—
2024–25	Niagara IceDogs	OHL	62	36	39	75	34	5	2	3	5	4
2025–26	Niagara IceDogs	OHL	28	14	17	31	10	—	—	—	—	—
2025–26	Flint Firebirds	OHL	32	25	21	46	16	6	3	6	9	7
OHL totals			252	127	112	239	157	11	5	9	14	11
