= Levi Harper =

American ice hockey player (born 2008)

- Born: October 3, 2008 (age 18) Tampa, Florida, U.S.
- Height: 6 ft 0 in (183 cm)
- Weight: 185 lb (84 kg; 13 st 3 lb)
- Position: Defense
- Shoots: Right
- OHL team: Saginaw Spirit
- NHL draft: Eligible 2027

Levi Harper (born October 3, 2008) is an American ice hockey defenseman for the Saginaw Spirit of the Ontario Hockey League (OHL).

== Playing career ==
Harper was drafted in third-round, 52nd overall, by the Saginaw Spirit in the 2025 OHL Priority Selection. During the 2025–26 season, in his first season with the Spirit, he recorded 12 goals and 45 assists in 68 games. His 57 points set a new franchise record for points by a rookie defenseman. He led all rookie defenseman in scoring and ranked third among all rookie players. Following the season he was named to the First All-Rookie team and awarded the Bobby Smith Trophy.

On September 17, 2025, he committed to play college ice hockey at Minnesota. However, on July 10, 2026, he switched his commitment to play college ice hockey at Michigan during the 2027–28 season.

== International play ==
On August 4, 2025, he was selected to represent the United States at the 2025 Hlinka Gretzky Cup. During the tournament he recorded four goals and one assist in five games and won a gold medal. This was Team USA's first gold medal at the Hlinka Gretzky Cup since 2003.

On April 20, 2026, he was selected to represent the United States at the 2026 IIHF World U18 Championships and was scoreless in three games.

== Career statistics ==
=== Regular season and playoffs ===
			Regular season					Playoffs
Season	Team	League	GP	G	A	Pts	PIM	GP	G	A	Pts	PIM
2025–26	Saginaw Spirit	OHL	68	12	45	57	79	4	1	2	3	0
OHL totals			68	12	45	57	79	4	1	2	3	0

=== International ===
Year	Team	Event	Result	GP	G	A	Pts	PIM
2025	United States	HG18	1st place, gold medalist(s)	5	4	1	5	4
2026	United States	U18	5th	3	0	0	0	0
Junior totals				8	4	1	5	4

== Awards and honors ==
Award	Year	Ref
OHL
First All-Rookie Team	2026	
Bobby Smith Trophy	2026	
