= Alexei Medvedev (ice hockey, born 2007) =

Russian ice hockey player (born 2007)

- Born: 10 September 2007 (age 19) Saint Petersburg, Russia
- Height: 6 ft 3 in (191 cm)
- Weight: 181 lb (82 kg; 12 st 13 lb)
- Position: Goaltender
- Catches: Left
- OHL team: London Knights
- NHL draft: 47th overall, 2025; Vancouver Canucks

Alexei Medvedev (born 10 September 2007) is a Russian ice hockey goaltender for the Peterborough Petes of the Ontario Hockey League (OHL). He was drafted 47th overall by the Vancouver Canucks in the 2025 NHL entry draft.

== Playing career ==
Medvedev was a second-round pick by the London Knights in the 2023 OHL Draft, and one of the youngest players available in the draft. In his rookie season with the Knights, Medvedev won the Dave Pinkney Trophy with Austin Elliott for lowest goals against average.

Leading up to the 2025 draft, Medvedev's .922 save percentage was among the best for draft eligible goalies in the CHL.

He signed a three-year, entry-level contract with the Canucks on July 10, 2025.
