= Chernolesovsky =

Chernolesovsky Чернолесовский
- Selo
- Location within Bashkortostan Location within Russia
- Coordinates: 54°51′N 55°48′E
- Country: Russia
- Region: Bashkortostan
- District: Ufimsky District
- Time zone: UTC+5:00

Chernolesovsky (Russian: Чернолесовский) is a rural locality (a selo) in Krasnoyarsky Selsoviet, Ufimsky District, Bashkortostan, Russia. The population was 1,118 as of 2010. There are 20 streets.

== Geography ==
Chernolesovsky is located 23 km northwest of Ufa (the district's administrative centre) by road. Mudarisovo is the nearest rural locality.
