= 2024 NHL entry draft =

Meeting of National Hockey League franchises to select newly eligible players

General information
- Date: June 28–29, 2024
- Location: Sphere; Paradise, Nevada, U.S.
- Networks: Sportsnet, TVA Sports (Canada); ESPN, NHL Network (United States)

Overview
- 225 total selections in 7 rounds
- First selection: (Canada) Macklin Celebrini (San Jose Sharks)

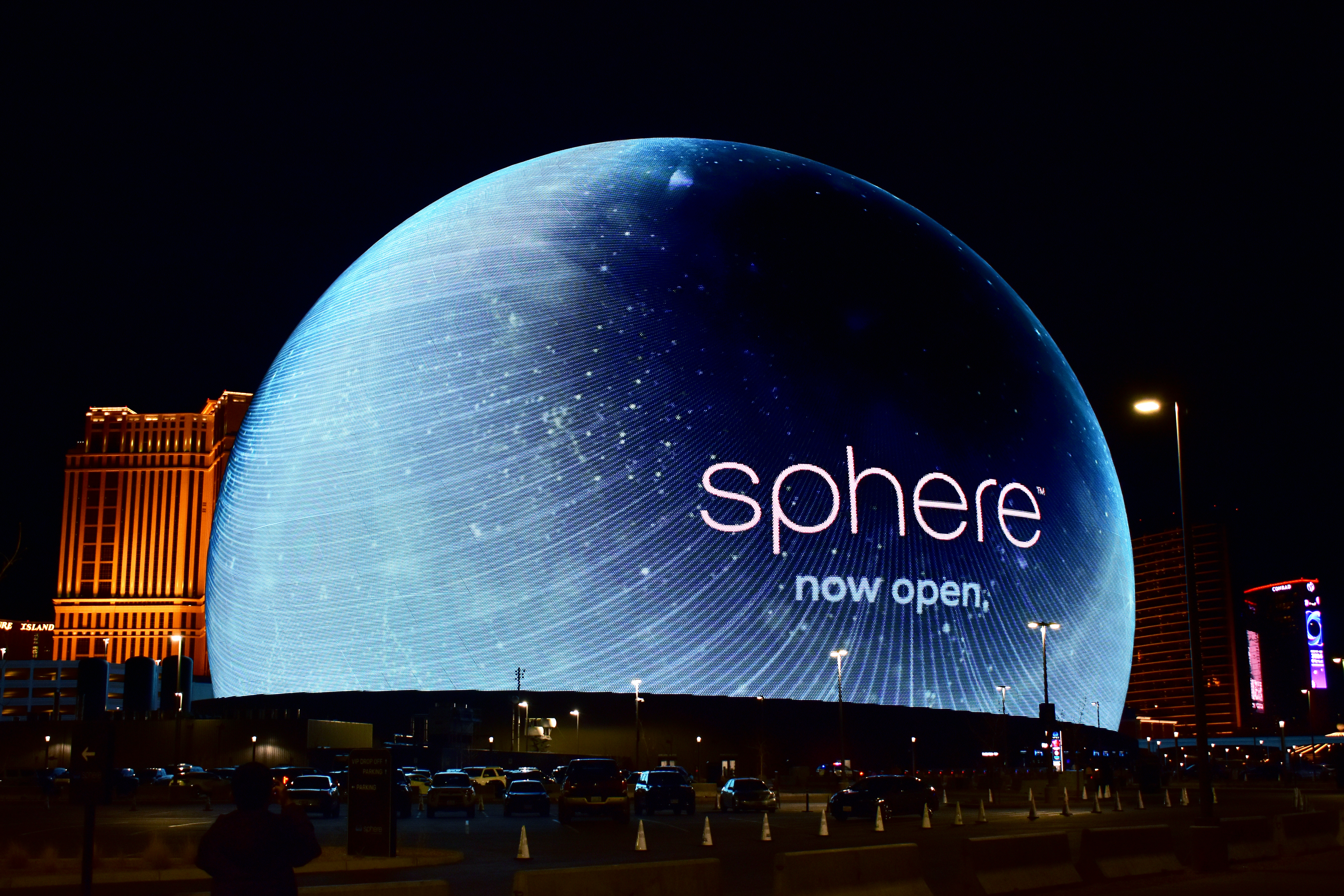
The event was held at Sphere in Paradise, Nevada.

The 2024 NHL entry draft was the 62nd draft for the National Hockey League. It was held on June 28–29, 2024, at Sphere in Paradise, Nevada. As per their April 2024 agreement, all draft rights held by the deactivated Arizona Coyotes franchise were transferred to the new Utah Hockey Club. The San Jose Sharks held the first overall pick for the first time in franchise history. The first three selections were Macklin Celebrini by the San Jose Sharks, Artyom Levshunov by the Chicago Blackhawks, and Beckett Sennecke by the Anaheim Ducks.

== Eligibility ==
Ice hockey players born between January 1, 2004, and September 15, 2006, were eligible for selection in the 2024 NHL entry draft. Additionally, un-drafted, non-North American players born in 2003 were eligible for the draft; and those players who were drafted in the 2022 NHL entry draft, but not signed by an NHL team and who were born after June 30, 2004, were also eligible to re-enter the draft.

== Draft lottery ==
External videos
- Gary Bettman conducts the 2024 NHL Draft Lottery, NHL's official YouTube channel. May 7, 2024.

Since the 2012–13 NHL season, all teams not qualifying for the Stanley Cup playoffs have a "weighted" chance at winning the first overall selection. Beginning with the 2014–15 NHL season, the NHL changed the weighting system that was used in previous years. Under the new system, the odds of winning the draft lottery for the four lowest finishing teams in the league decreased, while the odds for the other non-playoff teams increased. As the league reduced the number of lottery drawings before the 2021–22 season, this resulted in two lotteries being held instead of three, and since the 2022 draft lottery, the teams winning one of the two drawings are allowed to move up a maximum of ten spots in the draft order and a team is only allowed to move up by winning the lottery twice in a five-year period.

The San Jose Sharks and Chicago Blackhawks won the two draft lotteries that were held on May 7, 2024. No change in the draft order occurred after the results of the lottery for the first time since 2010. Although the Chicago Blackhawks won the first overall selection in 2023 and the second overall selection in 2024, the latter did not improve on their 2024 pre-draft position, so the team remains eligible to win the draft lottery again in 2025.

Indicates team won first overall
Indicates team won second overall
Indicates teams that did not win a lottery

Complete draft position odds
Team	1st	2nd	3rd	4th	5th	6th	7th	8th	9th	10th	11th	12th	13th	14th	15th	16th
San Jose	25.5%	18.8%	55.7%													
Chicago	13.5%	14.1%	30.7%	41.7%												
Anaheim	11.5%	11.2%	7.8%	39.7%	29.8%											
Columbus	9.5%	9.5%	0.3%	15.4%	44.6%	20.8%										
Montreal	8.5%	8.6%	0.3%		24.5%	44.0%	14.2%									
Utah	7.5%	7.7%	0.2%			34.1%	41.4%	9.1%								
Ottawa	6.5%	6.7%	0.2%				44.4%	36.5%	5.6%							
Seattle	6.0%	6.2%	0.2%					54.4%	30.0%	3.2%						
Calgary	5.0%	5.2%	0.2%						64.4%	23.5%	1.7%					
New Jersey	3.5%	3.7%	0.1%							73.3%	18.4%	0.9%				
Buffalo	3.0%	3.2%	0.1%								79.9%	13.4%	0.5%			
Philadelphia		5.3%										85.7%	8.9%	0.2%		
Minnesota			4.3%										90.7%	5.1%	>0.0%	
Pittsburgh				3.1%										94.7%	2.1%	>0.0%
Detroit					1.1%										97.9%	1.1%
St. Louis						1.0%										98.9%

== Top prospects ==
Source: NHL Central Scouting (April 16, 2024) ranking.

Ranking	North American skaters	European skaters
1	(Canada) Macklin Celebrini (C)	(Russia) Anton Silayev (D)
2	(Belarus) Artyom Levshunov (D)	(Russia) Ivan Demidov (RW)
3	(Canada) Cayden Lindstrom (C)	(Finland) Konsta Helenius (C)
4	(United States) Zeev Buium (D)	(Czech Republic) Adam Jiricek (D)
5	(Canada) Zayne Parekh (D)	(Norway) Michael Brandsegg-Nygard (RW)
6	(United States) Trevor Connelly (LW)	(Finland) Emil Hemming (RW)
7	(Canada) Sam Dickinson (D)	(Sweden) Leo Sahlin Wallenius (D)
8	(Canada) Berkly Catton (C)	(Finland) Aron Kiviharju (D)
9	(Canada) Tij Iginla (C)	(Russia) Igor Chernyshov (LW)
10	(Canada) Michael Hage (C)	(Sweden) Linus Eriksson (C)

Ranking	North American goalies	European goalies
1	(Russia) Mikhail Yegorov	(Finland) Eemil Vinni
2	(Canada) Carter George	(Russia) Ilya Nabokov
3	(Czech Republic) Lukas Matecha	(Finland) Kim Saarinen

== Selections by round ==
The order of the 2024 entry draft is listed below.

=== Round one ===
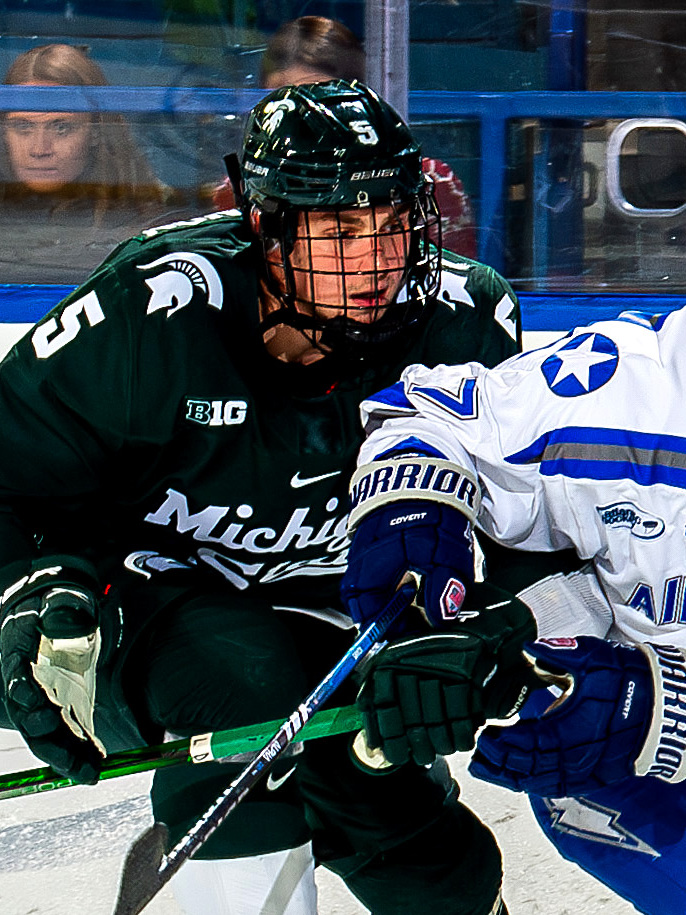
Artyom Levshunov was selected second overall by the Chicago Blackhawks.

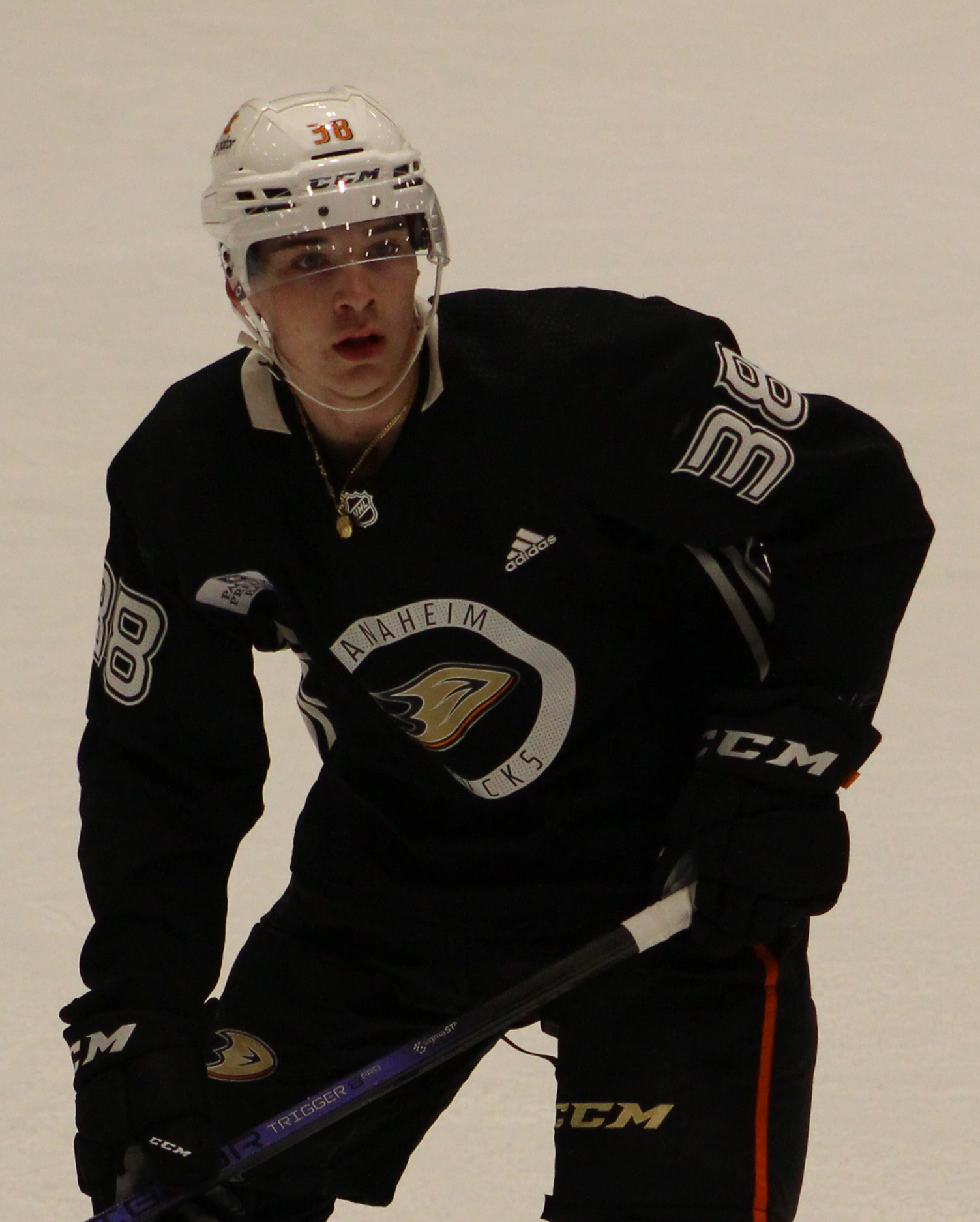
Beckett Sennecke was selected third overall by the Anaheim Ducks.

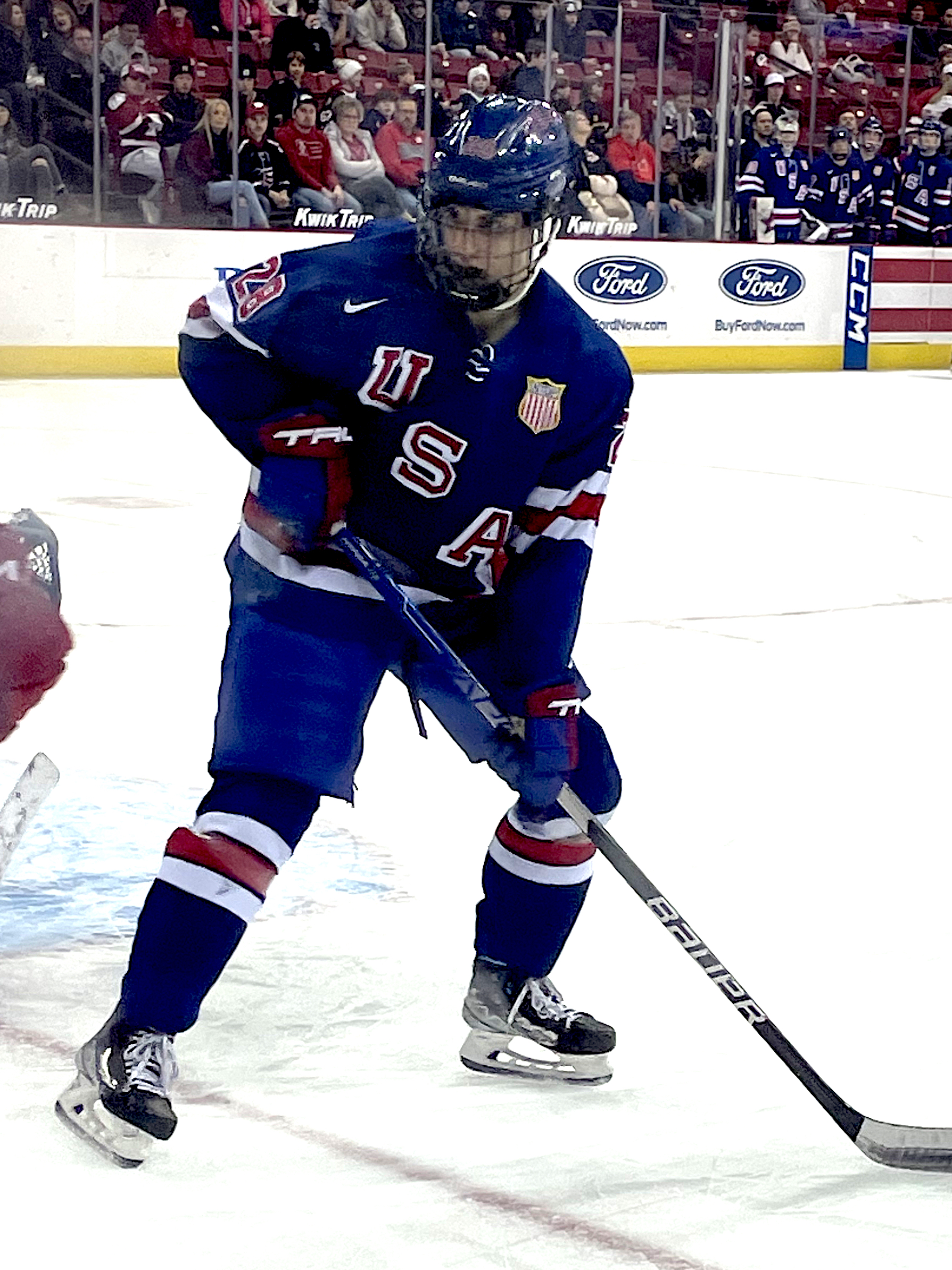
Zeev Buium was selected 12th overall by the Minnesota Wild.

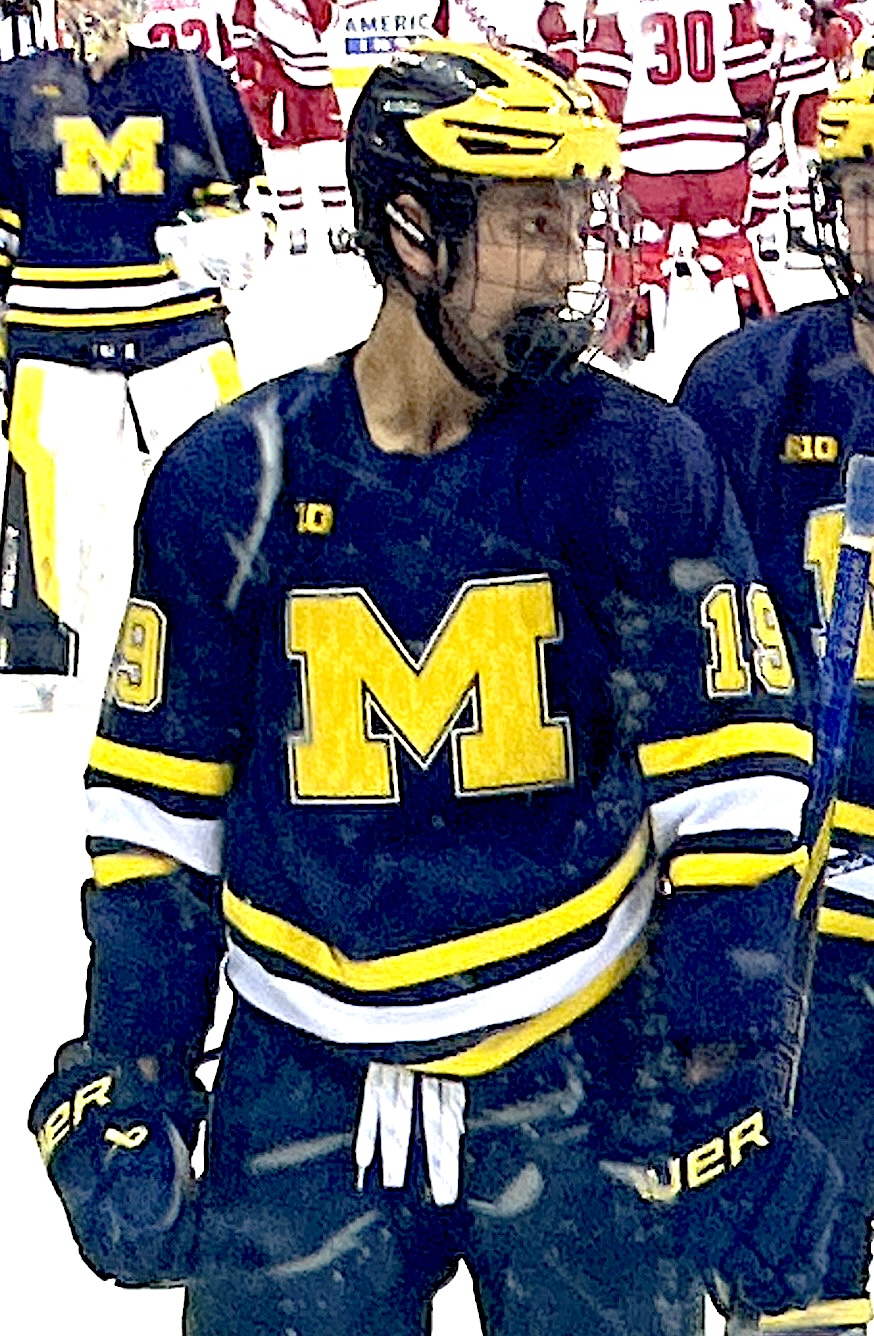
Michael Hage was selected 21st overall by the Montreal Canadiens.

#	Player	Nationality	NHL team	College/junior/club team
1	Macklin Celebrini (C)	Canada	San Jose Sharks	Boston University Terriers (Hockey East)
2	Artyom Levshunov (D)	Belarus	Chicago Blackhawks	Michigan State Spartans (Big Ten)
3	Beckett Sennecke (RW)	Canada	Anaheim Ducks	Oshawa Generals (OHL)
4	Cayden Lindstrom (C)	Canada	Columbus Blue Jackets	Medicine Hat Tigers (WHL)
5	Ivan Demidov (RW)	Russia	Montreal Canadiens	SKA-1946 (MHL)
6	Tij Iginla (C)	Canada	Utah Hockey Club	Kelowna Rockets (WHL)
7	Carter Yakemchuk (D)	Canada	Ottawa Senators	Calgary Hitmen (WHL)
8	Berkly Catton (C)	Canada	Seattle Kraken	Spokane Chiefs (WHL)
9	Zayne Parekh (D)	Canada	Calgary Flames	Saginaw Spirit (OHL)
10	Anton Silayev (D)	Russia	New Jersey Devils	Torpedo Nizhny Novgorod (KHL)
11	Sam Dickinson (D)	Canada	San Jose Sharks (from Buffalo)^{1}	London Knights (OHL)
12	Zeev Buium (D)	United States	Minnesota Wild (from Philadelphia)^{2}	Denver Pioneers (NCHC)
13	Jett Luchanko (C)	Canada	Philadelphia Flyers (from Minnesota)^{3}	Guelph Storm (OHL)
14	Konsta Helenius (C)	Finland	Buffalo Sabres (from Pittsburgh via San Jose)^{4}	Mikkelin Jukurit (Liiga)
15	Michael Brandsegg-Nygard (RW)	Norway	Detroit Red Wings	Mora IK (HockeyAllsvenskan)
16	Adam Jiricek (D)	Czech Republic	St. Louis Blues	HC Skoda Plzen (Czech Extraliga)
17	Terik Parascak (RW)	Canada	Washington Capitals	Prince George Cougars (WHL)
18	Sacha Boisvert (C)	Canada	Chicago Blackhawks (from NY Islanders)^{5}	Muskegon Lumberjacks (USHL)
19	Trevor Connelly (LW)	United States	Vegas Golden Knights	Tri-City Storm (USHL)
20	Cole Eiserman (LW)	United States	New York Islanders (from Tampa Bay via Chicago)^{6}	U.S. NTDP (USHL)
21	Michael Hage (C)	Canada	Montreal Canadiens (from Los Angeles)^{7}	Chicago Steel (USHL)
22	Yegor Surin (C)	Russia	Nashville Predators	Loko Yaroslavl (MHL)
23	Stian Solberg (D)	Norway	Anaheim Ducks (from Toronto)^{8}	Vålerenga Ishockey (EliteHockey Ligaen)
24	Cole Beaudoin (C)	Canada	Utah Hockey Club (from Colorado)^{9}	Barrie Colts (OHL)
25	Dean Letourneau (C)	Canada	Boston Bruins (from Boston via Detroit and Ottawa)^{10}	St. Andrew's College Saints (CISAA)
26	Liam Greentree (RW)	Canada	Los Angeles Kings (from Winnipeg via Montreal)^{11}	Windsor Spitfires (OHL)
27	Marek Vanacker (LW)	Canada	Chicago Blackhawks (from Carolina)^{12}	Brantford Bulldogs (OHL)
28	Matvei Gridin (RW)	Russia	Calgary Flames (from Vancouver)^{13}	Muskegon Lumberjacks (USHL)
29	Emil Hemming (RW)	Finland	Dallas Stars	HC TPS (Liiga)
30	E. J. Emery (D)	United States	New York Rangers	U.S. NTDP (USHL)
31	Ben Danford (D)	Canada	Toronto Maple Leafs (from Edmonton via Anaheim)^{14}	Oshawa Generals (OHL)
32	Sam O'Reilly (RW)	Canada	Edmonton Oilers (from Florida via Philadelphia)^{15}	London Knights (OHL)

Notes

1. The Buffalo Sabres' first-round pick went to the San Jose Sharks as the result of a trade on June 27, 2024, that sent Pittsburgh's first-round pick and New Jersey's second-round pick in 2024 to Buffalo in exchange for this pick.
2. The Philadelphia Flyers' first-round pick went to the Minnesota Wild as the result of a trade on June 28, 2024, that sent a first-round pick 2024 (13th overall) and a third-round pick in 2025 to Philadelphia in exchange for this pick.
3. The Minnesota Wild's first-round pick went to the Philadelphia Flyers as the result of a trade on June 28, 2024, that sent a first-round pick 2024 (12th overall) to Minnesota in exchange for a third-round pick in 2025 and this pick.
4. The Pittsburgh Penguins' first-round pick went to the Buffalo Sabres as the result of a trade on June 27, 2024, that sent a first-round pick in 2024 to San Jose in exchange for New Jersey's second-round pick in 2024 and this pick.
  San Jose previously acquired this pick as the result of a trade on August 6, 2023, that sent Dillon Hamaliuk, Erik Karlsson and a third-round pick in 2026 to Pittsburgh in exchange for Mikael Granlund, Mike Hoffman, Jan Rutta and this pick (being conditional at the time of the trade). The condition – San Jose will receive a first-round pick in 2024 if Pittsburgh's first-round pick in 2024 is outside of the top ten selections – was converted when the Penguins did not win either draft lottery draw on May 7, 2024.
5. The New York Islanders' first-round pick went to the Chicago Blackhawks as the result of a trade on May 24, 2024, that sent Tampa Bay's first-round pick and Los Angeles and Vancouver's second-round picks all in 2024 to New York in exchange for a second-round pick in 2024 and this pick.
6. The Tampa Bay Lightning's first-round pick went to the New York Islanders as the result of a trade on May 24, 2024, that sent a first and second-round pick in 2024 to Chicago in exchange for Los Angeles and Vancouver's second-round picks both in 2024 and this pick.
  Chicago previously acquired this pick as the result of a trade on March 18, 2022, that sent Brandon Hagel and a fourth-round pick in both 2022 and 2024 to Tampa Bay in exchange for Boris Katchouk, Taylor Raddysh, a conditional first-round pick in 2023 and this pick (being conditional at the time of the trade). The condition – Chicago will receive a first-round pick in 2024 if Tampa Bay's first-round pick in 2024 is outside of the top ten selections – was converted when the Lightning qualified for the 2024 Stanley Cup playoffs on April 5, 2024.
7. The Los Angeles Kings' first-round pick went to the Montreal Canadiens as the result of a trade on June 28, 2024, that sent Winnipeg's first-round pick, Colorado's second-round pick and a seventh-round pick all in 2024 (26th, 57th and 198th overall) to Los Angeles in exchange for this pick.
8. The Toronto Maple Leafs' first-round pick went to the Anaheim Ducks as the result of a trade on June 28, 2024, that sent Edmonton's first-round pick 2024 (31st overall) and Boston's second-round pick in 2024 (58th overall) to Toronto in exchange for this pick.
9. The Colorado Avalanche's first-round pick went to the Utah Hockey Club as the result of a trade on June 28, 2024, that sent a second and third-round pick both in 2024 (38th and 71st overall) and the Ranger's second-round pick in 2025 to Colorado in exchange for this pick.
10. The Boston Bruins' first-round pick was re-acquired as the result of a trade on June 24, 2024, that sent Linus Ullmark to Ottawa in exchange for Mark Kastelic, Joonas Korpisalo and this pick.
  Ottawa previously acquired this pick as the result of a trade on July 9, 2023, that sent Alex DeBrincat to Detroit in exchange for Dominik Kubalik, Donovan Sebrango, a fourth-round pick in 2024 and this pick (being conditional at the time of the trade). The condition – Ottawa will receive either Boston or Detroit's first-round pick in 2024, at Detroit's choice – the Red Wings sent Ottawa Boston's first-round pick and the date of conversion is unknown.
  Detroit previously acquired this pick as the result of a trade on March 2, 2023, that sent Tyler Bertuzzi to Boston in exchange for a fourth-round pick in 2025 and this pick (being conditional at the time of the trade). The condition – Detroit will receive a first-round pick in 2024 if Boston's first-round pick in 2024 is outside the top ten selections – was converted when the Bruins qualified for the 2024 Stanley Cup playoffs on March 28, 2024.
11. The Winnipeg Jets' first-round pick went to the Los Angeles Kings as the result of a trade on June 28, 2024, that sent a first-round pick in 2024 (21st overall) to Montreal in exchange for Colorado's second-round pick in 2024 (57th overall), a seventh-round pick both in 2024 (198th overall) and this pick.
  Montreal previously acquired this pick as the result of a trade on February 2, 2024, that sent Sean Monahan to Winnipeg in exchange for a conditional third-round pick in 2027 and this pick.
12. The Carolina Hurricanes' first-round pick went to the Chicago Blackhawks as the result of a trade on June 28, 2024, that sent a second-round pick 2024 (34th overall) and the Islanders' second-round pick in 2024 (50th overall) to Carolina in exchange for this pick.
13. The Vancouver Canucks' first-round pick went to the Calgary Flames as the result of a trade on January 31, 2024, that sent Elias Lindholm to Vancouver in exchange for Hunter Brzustewicz, Joni Jurmo, Andrei Kuzmenko, a conditional fourth-round pick in 2024 and this pick.
14. The Edmonton Oilers' first-round pick went to the Toronto Maple Leafs as the result of a trade on June 28, 2024, that sent a first-round pick in 2024 (23rd overall) to Anaheim in exchange for Boston's second-round pick in 2024 (58th overall) and this pick.
  Anaheim previously acquired this pick as the result of a trade on March 6, 2024, that sent Sam Carrick, Adam Henrique, Ty Taylor, and a seventh-round pick in 2024 to Edmonton in exchange for a conditional fifth-round pick in 2025 and this pick.
15. The Florida Panthers' first-round pick went to the Edmonton Oilers as the result of a trade on June 28, 2024, that sent a conditional first-round pick in 2025 to Philadelphia in exchange for this pick.
  Philadelphia previously acquired this pick as the result of a trade on March 19, 2022, that sent Connor Bunnaman, Claude Giroux, German Rubtsov and a fifth-round pick in 2024 to Florida in exchange for Owen Tippett, a third-round pick in 2023 and this pick (being conditional at the time of the trade). The condition – Philadelphia will acquire a first-round pick in 2024 if Florida's first-round pick in 2024 is outside the top ten selections – was converted when the Panthers qualified for the 2024 Stanley Cup playoffs on March 28, 2024.

=== Round two ===
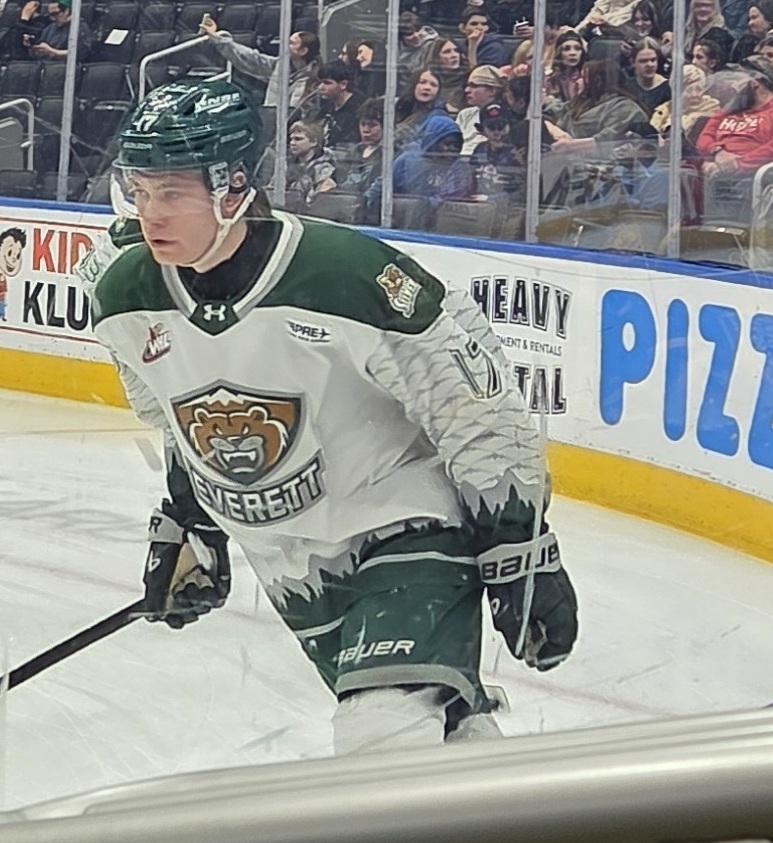
Julius Miettinen was selected 40th overall by the Seattle Kraken.

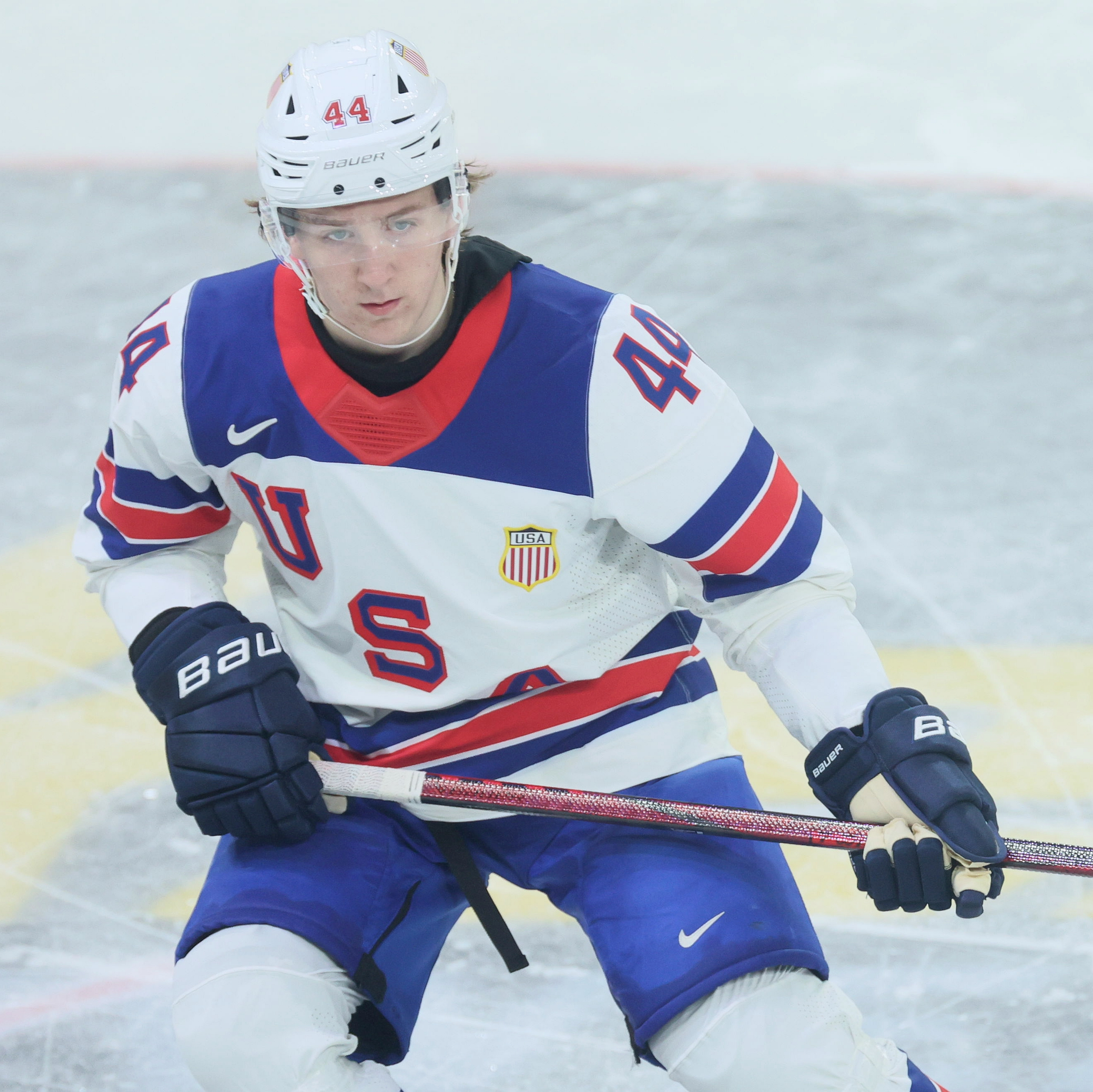
Cole Hutson was selected 43rd overall by the Washington Capitals

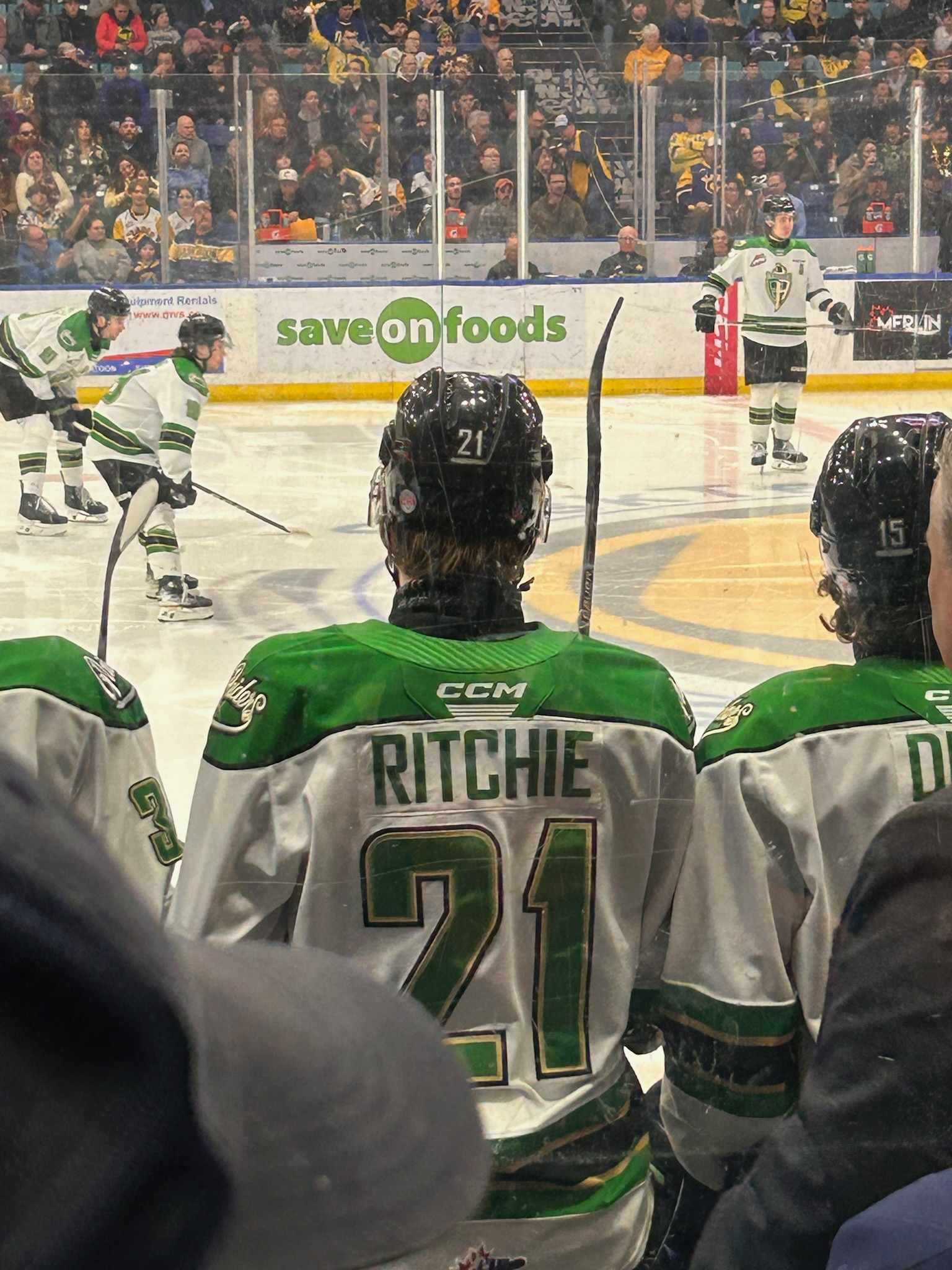
Ryder Ritchie was selected 45th overall by the Minnesota Wild

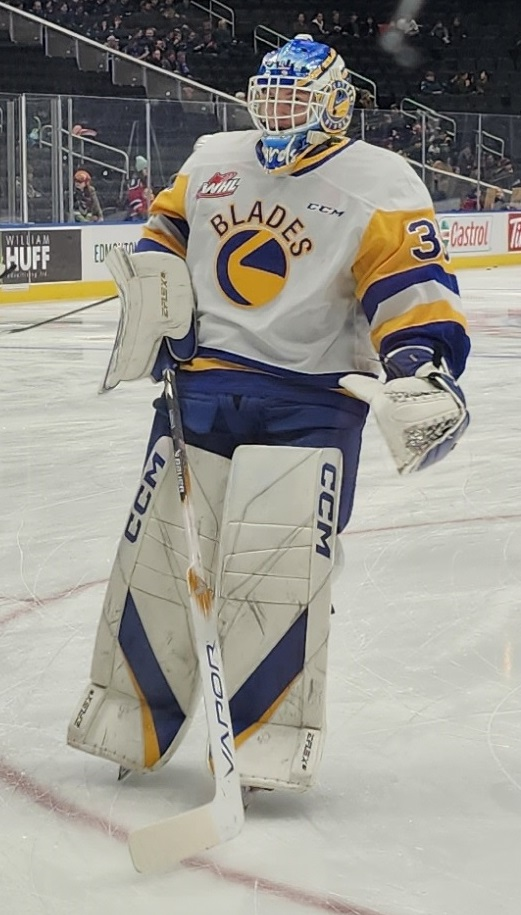
Evan Gardner was selected 60th overall by the Columbus Blue Jackets.

#	Player	Nationality	NHL team	College/junior/club team
33	Igor Chernyshov (LW)	Russia	San Jose Sharks	Dynamo Moscow (KHL)
34	Dominik Badinka (D)	Czech Republic	Carolina Hurricanes (from Chicago)^{1}	Malmo Redhawks (SHL)
35	Lucas Pettersson (C)	Sweden	Anaheim Ducks	Modo Hockey (J20 Nationell)
36	Charlie Elick (D)	Canada	Columbus Blue Jackets	Brandon Wheat Kings (WHL)
37	Alfons Freij (D)	Sweden	Winnipeg Jets (from Montreal via Utah and Los Angeles)^{2}	Vaxjo Lakers (J20 Nationell)
38	Ilya Nabokov (G)	Russia	Colorado Avalanche (from Utah)^{3}	Metallurg Magnitogorsk (KHL)
39	Gabriel Eliasson (D)	Sweden	Ottawa Senators	HV71 (J20 Nationell)
40	Julius Miettinen (C)	Finland	Seattle Kraken	Everett Silvertips (WHL)
41	Andrew Basha (LW)	Canada	Calgary Flames	Medicine Hat Tigers (WHL)
42	Adam Kleber (D)	United States	Buffalo Sabres (from New Jersey via San Jose)^{4}	Lincoln Stars (USHL)
43	Cole Hutson (D)	United States	Washington Capitals (from Buffalo)^{5}	U.S. NTDP (USHL)
44	Harrison Brunicke (D)	Canada	Pittsburgh Penguins (from Philadelphia via Carolina)^{6}	Kamloops Blazers (WHL)
45	Ryder Ritchie (RW)	Canada	Minnesota Wild	Prince Albert Raiders (WHL)
46	Tanner Howe (LW)	Canada	Pittsburgh Penguins	Regina Pats (WHL)
47	Max Plante (LW)	United States	Detroit Red Wings	U.S. NTDP (USHL)
48	Colin Ralph (D)	United States	St. Louis Blues	Shattuck-Saint Mary's Sabres (USHS)
49	Mikhail Yegorov (G)	Russia	New Jersey Devils (from Washington via Ottawa and Utah)^{7}	Omaha Lancers (USHL)
50	Nikita Artamonov (LW)	Russia	Carolina Hurricanes (from NY Islanders via Chicago)^{8}	Torpedo Nizhny Novgorod (KHL)
51	Jack Berglund (C/LW)	Sweden	Philadelphia Flyers (compensatory)^{9}	Farjestad BK (J20 Nationell)
52	Leon Muggli (D)	Switzerland	Washington Capitals (from Vegas)^{10}	EV Zug (National League)
53	Leo Sahlin Wallenius (D)	Sweden	San Jose Sharks (from Tampa Bay via Nashville and Detroit)^{11}	Vaxjo Lakers (J20 Nationell)
54	Jesse Pulkkinen (D)	Finland	New York Islanders (from Los Angeles via Philadelphia and Chicago)^{12}	JYP (Liiga)
55	Teddy Stiga (C)	United States	Nashville Predators	U.S. NTDP (USHL)
56	Lukas Fischer (D)	United States	St. Louis Blues (from Toronto)^{13}	Sarnia Sting (OHL)
57	Carter George (G)	Canada	Los Angeles Kings (from Colorado via Montreal)^{14}	Owen Sound Attack (OHL)
58	Linus Eriksson (C)	Sweden	Florida Panthers (from Boston via Anaheim and Toronto)^{15}	Djurgardens IF (HockeyAllsvenskan)
59	Spencer Gill (D)	Canada	Philadelphia Flyers (from Winnipeg via Nashville)^{16}	Rimouski Oceanic (QMJHL)
60	Evan Gardner (G)	Canada	Columbus Blue Jackets (from Carolina)^{17}	Saskatoon Blades (WHL)
61	Kamil Bednarik (C)	United States	New York Islanders (from Vancouver via Chicago)^{18}	U.S. NTDP (USHL)
62	Jacob Battaglia (RW)	Canada	Calgary Flames (from Dallas)^{19}	Kingston Frontenacs (OHL)
63	Nathan Villeneuve (C)	Canada	Seattle Kraken (from NY Rangers)^{20}	Sudbury Wolves (OHL)
64	Eemil Vinni (G)	Finland	Edmonton Oilers	Kiekko-Pojat (Mestis)
65	Will Skahan (D)	United States	Utah Hockey Club (from Florida)^{21}	U.S. NTDP (USHL)

Notes

1. The Chicago Blackhawks' second-round pick went to the Carolina Hurricanes as the result of a trade on June 28, 2024, that sent a first-round pick in 2024 (27th overall) to Chicago in exchange for the Islanders' second-round pick in 2024 (50th overall) and this pick.
2. The Montreal Canadiens' second-round pick went to the Winnipeg Jets as the result of a trade on June 27, 2023, that sent Pierre-Luc Dubois to Los Angeles in exchange for Alex Iafallo, Rasmus Kupari, Gabriel Vilardi and this pick.
  Los Angeles previously acquired this pick as the result of a trade on June 24, 2023, that sent Sean Durzi to the Arizona Coyotes in exchange for this pick.
  The Arizona Coyotes previously acquired this pick as a result of a trade on September 4, 2021, that sent Christian Dvorak to Montreal in exchange for a conditional first-round pick in 2022 and this pick.
3. The Utah Hockey Club's second-round pick went to the Colorado Avalanche as the result of a trade on June 28, 2024, that sent a first-round pick in 2024 (24th overall) to Utah in exchange for a third-round pick in 2024 (71st overall), the Rangers' second-round pick in 2025 and this pick.
4. The New Jersey Devils' second-round pick went to the Buffalo Sabres as the result of a trade on June 27, 2024, that sent a first-round pick in 2024 to San Jose in exchange for Pittsburgh's first-round pick in 2024 and this pick.
  San Jose Sharks previously acquired this pick as a result of the trade on February 26, 2023, that sent Zachary Emond, Scott Harrington, Santeri Hatakka, Timur Ibragimov, Timo Meier, and Colorado's fifth-round pick in 2024 to New Jersey in exchange for Andreas Johnsson, Shakir Mukhamadullin, Nikita Okhotiuk, Fabian Zetterlund, a conditional first-round pick in 2023, a seventh-round pick in 2024 and this pick (being conditional at the time of the trade). The condition – San Jose will receive a second-round pick in 2024 if the Devils do not advance the 2024 Eastern Conference Final – was converted when the Devils were eliminated from the 2024 Stanley Cup playoffs on April 9, 2024.
5. The Buffalo Sabres' second-round pick went to the Washington Capitals as the result of a trade on June 29, 2024, that sent Beck Malenstyn to Buffalo in exchange for this pick.
6. The Philadelphia Flyers' second-round pick went to the Pittsburgh Penguins as the result of a trade on March 7, 2024, that sent Jake Guentzel and Ty Smith to Carolina in exchange for Michael Bunting, Ville Koivunen, Cruz Lucius, Vasili Ponomaryov, a conditional fifth-round pick in 2024 and this pick (being conditional at the time of the trade). The condition – Pittsburgh will receive Philadelphia's second-round pick in 2024 if the Hurricanes do not advance to the 2024 Stanley Cup Final – was converted when Carolina was eliminated from the 2024 Stanley Cup playoffs on May 16, 2024.
  Carolina previously acquired this pick as the result of a trade on July 8, 2022, that sent Tony DeAngelo and a seventh-round pick in 2022 to Philadelphia in exchange for a fourth-round pick in 2022, a conditional third-round pick in 2023 and this pick.
7. The Washington Capitals' second-round pick went to New Jersey Devils as the result of a trade on June 29, 2024, that sent John Marino and Colorado's fifth-round pick in 2024 (153rd overall) to Utah in exchange for Edmonton's second-round pick in 2025 and this pick.
  Utah previously acquired this pick as the result of a trade on March 1, 2023, that sent Jakob Chychrun to Ottawa in exchange for a first-round pick in 2023, a second-round pick in 2026 and this pick (being conditional at the time of the trade). The condition – Arizona will receive Washington's second-round pick in 2024 if Ottawa does not advance to the 2023 Eastern Conference Final – was converted when the Senators did not qualify for the 2023 Stanley Cup playoffs on April 6, 2023.
  Ottawa previously acquired this pick as the result of a trade on July 13, 2022, that sent Connor Brown to Washington in exchange for this pick.
8. The New York Islanders' second-round pick went to the Carolina Hurricanes as the result of a trade June 28, 2024, that sent a first-round pick in 2024 (27th overall) to Chicago in exchange for a second-round pick in 2024 (34th overall) and this pick.
  Chicago previously acquired this pick as the result of a trade on May 24, 2024, that sent Tampa Bay's first-round pick and Los Angeles and Vancouver's second-round picks all in 2024 to New York in exchange for a first-round pick in 2024 and this pick.
9. The Philadelphia Flyers will receive the 19th pick of this round (51st overall) as compensation for not signing 2018 first-round selection Jay O'Brien.
10. The Vegas Golden Knights' second-round pick went to the Washington Capitals as the result of a trade on March 5, 2024, that sent Anthony Mantha to Vegas in exchange for a fourth-round pick in 2026 and this pick.
11. The Tampa Bay Lightning's second-round pick went to the San Jose Sharks as the result of a trade on June 25, 2024, that sent future considerations to Detroit in exchange for Jake Walman and this pick.
  Detroit previously acquired this pick as the result of a trade on June 25, 2024, that sent Andrew Gibson to Nashville in exchange for Jesse Kiiskinen and this pick.
  Nashville previously acquired this pick as the result of a trade on February 26, 2023, that sent Tanner Jeannot to Tampa Bay in exchange for Cal Foote, a conditional first-round pick in 2025, a third, fourth and fifth-round pick all in 2023 and this pick.
12. The Los Angeles Kings' second-round pick went to the New York Islanders as the result of a trade on May 24, 2024, that sent a first and second-round pick both in 2024 to Chicago in exchange for Tampa Bay's first-round pick and Vancouver's second-round pick both in 2024 and this pick.
  Chicago previously acquired this pick as the result of a trade on June 29, 2023, that sent Tampa Bay's second-round pick in 2023 to Philadelphia in exchange for a sixth-round pick in 2023 and this pick.
  Philadelphia previously acquired this pick as the result of a trade on June 6, 2023, that sent Hayden Hodgson and Ivan Provorov to Los Angeles in exchange for Helge Grans, Cal Petersen, Sean Walker and this pick.
13. The Toronto Maple Leafs' second-round pick went to the St. Louis Blues as the result of a trade on February 17, 2023, that sent Noel Acciari and Josh Pillar to Toronto in exchange for Mikhail Abramov, Adam Gaudette, a first-round pick in 2023, Ottawa's third-round pick in 2023 and this pick.
14. The Colorado Avalanche's second-round pick went to the Los Angeles Kings as the result of a trade on June 28, 2024, that sent a first-round pick in 2024 (21st overall) to Montreal in exchange for Winnipeg's first-round pick 2024 (26th overall), a seventh-round pick in 2024 (198th overall) and this pick.
  Montreal previously acquired this pick as the result of a trade on March 21, 2022, that sent Artturi Lehkonen to Colorado in exchange for Justin Barron and this pick.
15. The Boston Bruins' second-round pick went to the Florida Panthers as the result of a trade on June 29, 2024, that sent a second-round pick in 2025 and a seventh-round pick in 2024 (225th overall) to Toronto in exchange for this pick.
  Toronto previously acquired this pick as the result of a trade on June 28, 2024, that sent a first-round pick in 2024 (23rd overall) to Anaheim in exchange for Edmonton's first-round pick in 2024 (31st overall) this pick.
  Anaheim previously acquired this pick as the result of a trade on March 19, 2022, that sent Kodie Curran and Hampus Lindholm to Boston in exchange for John Moore, Urho Vaakanainen, a first-round pick in 2022, a second-round pick in 2023 and this pick.
16. The Winnipeg Jets' second-round pick went to the Philadelphia Flyers as the result of a trade on June 29, 2024, that sent a third-round pick in 2024 (77th overall) and Minnesota's third-round pick in 2025 to Nashville in exchange for this pick.
  Nashville previously acquired this pick as the result of a trade on February 25, 2023, that sent Nino Niederreiter to Winnipeg in exchange for this pick.
17. The Carolina Hurricanes' second-round pick went to the Columbus Blue Jackets as the result of a trade on June 29, 2024, that sent a third and fifth-round pick both in 2024 (69th and 133rd overall) to Carolina exchange for this pick.
18. The Vancouver Canucks' second-round pick went to the New York Islanders as the result of a trade on May 24, 2024, that sent a first and second-round pick both in 2024 to Chicago in exchange for Tampa Bay's first-round pick and Los Angeles' second-round pick both in 2024 and this pick.
  Chicago previously acquired this pick as the result of a trade on October 7, 2022, that sent Riley Stillman to Vancouver in exchange for Jason Dickinson and this pick.
19. The Dallas Stars' second-round pick went to the Calgary Flames as the result of a trade on February 28, 2024, that sent Christopher Tanev to Dallas in exchange for Artem Grushnikov, a conditional third-round pick in 2026 and this pick.
20. The New York Rangers' second-round pick went to the Seattle Kraken as the result of a trade on March 6, 2024, that sent Alexander Wennberg to New York in exchange for a conditional fourth-round pick in 2025 and this pick.
21. The Florida Panthers' second-round pick went to Utah Hockey Club as a result of a trade on July 26, 2021, that sent a seventh-round pick in 2023 to Florida in exchange for Vladislav Kolyachonok, Anton Stralman and this pick.

=== Round three ===
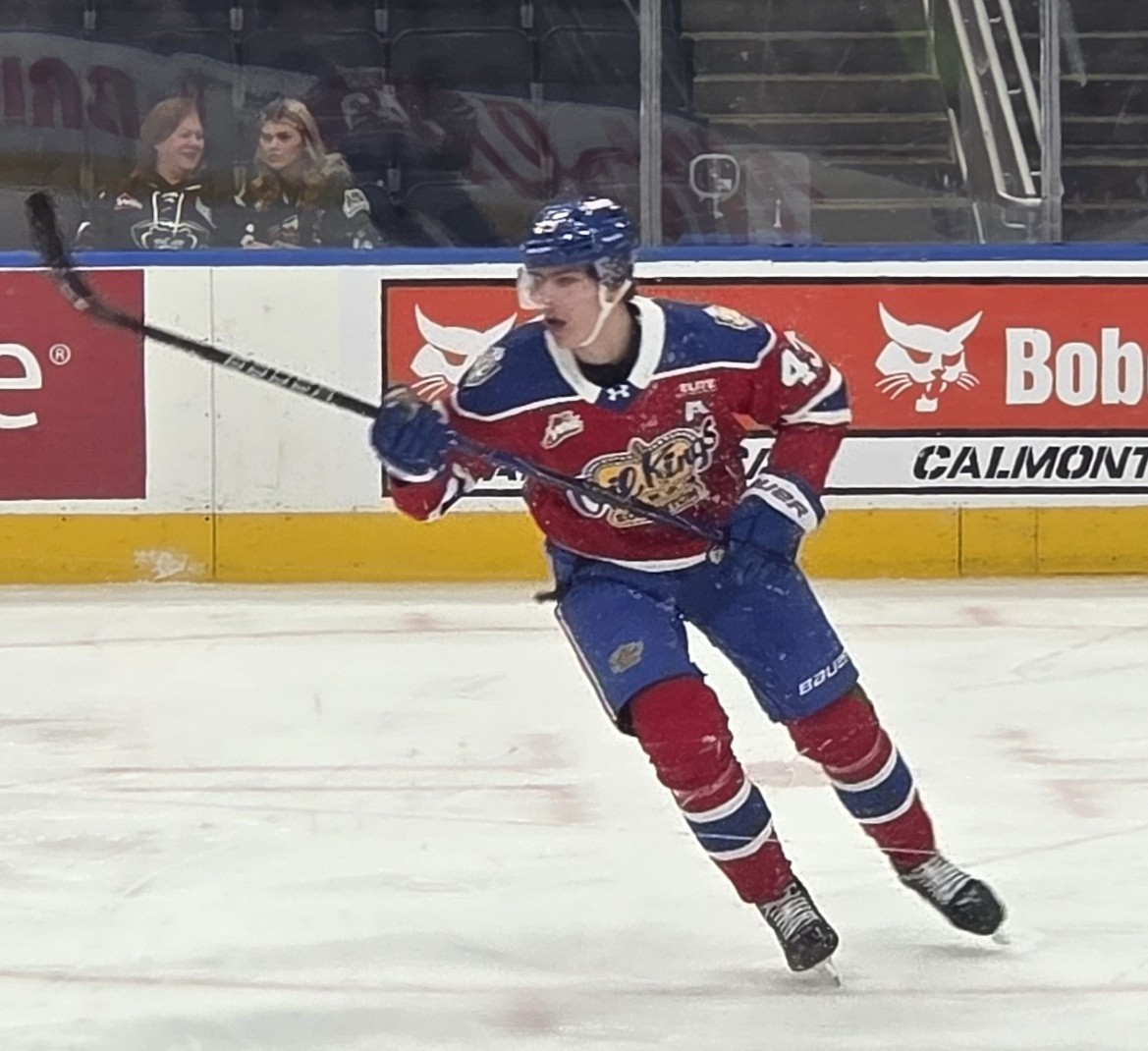
Adam Jecho was selected 95th overall by the St. Louis Blues.

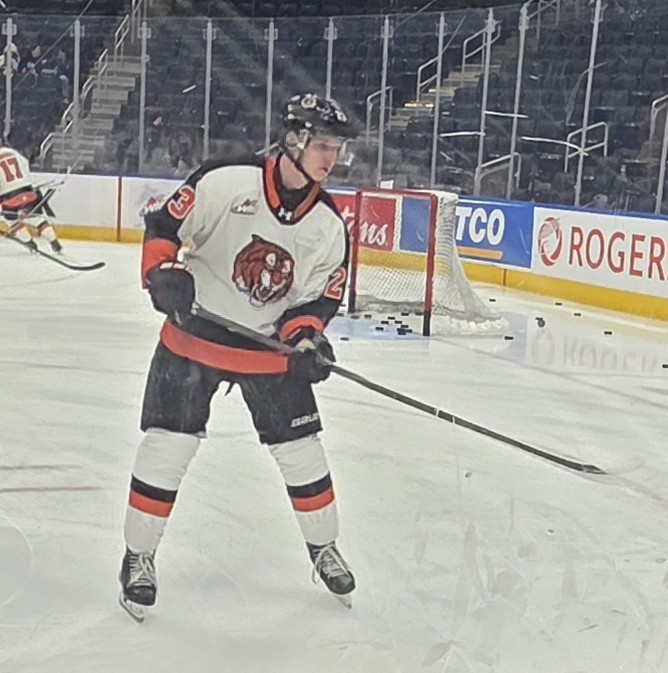
Veeti Väisänen was selected 96th overall by the Utah Hockey Club.

#	Player	Nationality	NHL team	College/junior/club team
66	Maxim Masse (RW)	Canada	Anaheim Ducks (from San Jose)^{1}	Chicoutimi Sagueneens (QMJHL)
67	John Mustard (LW)	Canada	Chicago Blackhawks	Waterloo Black Hawks (USHL)
68	Ethan Procyszyn (C)	Canada	Anaheim Ducks	North Bay Battalion (OHL)
69	Noel Fransen (D)	Sweden	Carolina Hurricanes (from Columbus)^{2}	Farjestad BK (J20 Nationell)
70	Aatos Koivu (C)	Finland	Montreal Canadiens	HC TPS (U20 SM-sarja)
71	Brodie Ziemer (RW)	United States	Buffalo Sabres (from Utah via Colorado)^{3}	U.S. NTDP (USHL)
72	A. J. Spellacy (RW)	United States	Chicago Blackhawks (from Ottawa)^{4}	Windsor Spitfires (OHL)
73	Alexis Bernier (D)	Canada	Seattle Kraken	Baie-Comeau Drakkar (QMJHL)
74	Henry Mews (D)	Canada	Calgary Flames	Ottawa 67's (OHL)
75	Ilya Protas (LW)	Belarus	Washington Capitals (from New Jersey)^{5}	Des Moines Buccaneers (USHL)
76	Will Zellers (C)	United States	Colorado Avalanche (from Buffalo)^{6}	Shattuck-Saint Mary's Sabres (USHS)
77	Viggo Gustafsson (D)	Sweden	Nashville Predators (from Philadelphia)^{7}	HV71 (J20 Nationell)
78	Logan Sawyer (LW)	Canada	Montreal Canadiens (from Minnesota via Washington)^{8}	Brooks Bandits (AJHL)
79	Tarin Smith (D)	Canada	Anaheim Ducks (from Pittsburgh)^{9}	Everett Silvertips (WHL)
80	Ondrej Becher (C)	Czech Republic	Detroit Red Wings	Prince George Cougars (WHL)
81	Ondrej Kos (RW)	Czech Republic	St. Louis Blues	Ilves (U20 SM-sarja)
82	Carson Wetsch (RW)	Canada	San Jose Sharks (from Washington via New Jersey)^{10}	Calgary Hitmen (WHL)
83	Pavel Moysevich (G)	Belarus	Vegas Golden Knights (from NY Islanders via Toronto and Washington)^{11}	SKA Saint Petersburg (KHL)
84	Kirll Zarubin (G)	Russia	Calgary Flames (from Vegas via Pittsburgh and Vegas)^{12}	HC AKM (MHL)
85	Kasper Pikkarainen (RW)	Finland	New Jersey Devils (from Tampa Bay via San Jose)^{13}	HC TPS (U20 SM-sarja)
86	Luca Marrelli (D)	Canada	Columbus Blue Jackets (from Los Angeles)^{14}	Oshawa Generals (OHL)
87	Miguel Marques (RW)	Canada	Nashville Predators	Lethbridge Hurricanes (WHL)
88	Kim Saarinen (G)	Finland	Seattle Kraken (from Toronto)^{15}	HPK (U20 SM-sarja)
89	Tomas Lavoie (D)	Canada	Utah Hockey Club (from Colorado)^{16}	Cape Breton Screaming Eagles (QMJHL)
90	Eriks Mateiko (W)	Latvia	Washington Capitals (from Boston)^{17}	Saint John Sea Dogs (QMJHL)
91	Herman Traff (LW)	Sweden	New Jersey Devils (from Winnipeg)^{18}	HV71 (J20 Nationell)
92	Jack Pridham (RW)	Canada	Chicago Blackhawks (from Carolina)^{19}	West Kelowna Warriors (BCHL)
93	Melvin Fernstrom (RW)	Sweden	Vancouver Canucks	Orebro HK (J20 Nationell)
94	Hiroki Gojsic (RW)	Canada	Nashville Predators (from Dallas)^{20}	Kelowna Rockets (WHL)
95	Adam Jecho (C)	Czech Republic	St. Louis Blues (from NY Rangers)^{21}	Edmonton Oil Kings (WHL)
96	Veeti Väisänen (D)	Finland	Utah Hockey Club (from Edmonton Oilers)^{22}	KooKoo (Liiga)
97	Matvei Shuravin (D)	Russia	Florida Panthers	Krasnaya Armiya (MHL)

Notes

1. The San Jose Sharks' third-round pick went to the Anaheim Ducks as the result of a trade on February 28, 2023, that sent Henry Thrun to San Jose in exchange for this pick.
2. The Columbus Blue Jackets' third-round pick went to the Carolina Hurricanes as the result of a trade on June 29, 2024, that sent a second-round pick in 2024 (60th overall) to Columbus in exchange for a fifth-round pick in 2024 (133rd overall) and this pick.
3. The Utah Hockey Club's third-round pick went to the Buffalo Sabres as the result of a trade on June 29, 2024, that sent a third-round pick in 2024 (76th overall) and Florida's fifth-round pick in 2024 (161st overall) to Colorado in exchange for this pick.
  Colorado previously acquired this pick as the result of a trade on June 28, 2024, that sent a first-round pick in 2024 (24th overall) to Utah in exchange for a second-round pick in 2024 (38th overall), the Rangers' second-round pick in 2025 and this pick.
4. The Ottawa Senators' third-round pick went to the Chicago Blackhawks as the result of a trade on July 7, 2022, that sent Alex DeBrincat to Ottawa in exchange for a first and second-round pick in 2022 and this pick.
5. The New Jersey Devils' third-round pick went to the Washington Capitals as the result of a trade on June 29, 2024, that sent a third and fifth-round pick both in 2024 (82nd and 146th overall) to New Jersey in exchange for this pick.
6. The Buffalo Sabres' third-round pick went to the Colorado Avalanche as the result of a trade on June 29, 2024, that sent Utah's third-round pick in 2024 (71st overall) to Buffalo in exchange for Florida's fifth-round pick 2024 (161st overall) and this pick.
7. The Philadelphia Flyers' third-round pick went to the Nashville Predators as the result of a trade on June 29, 2024, that sent Winnipeg's third-round pick in 2024 (59th overall) to Philadelphia in exchange for Minnesota's fifth-round pick 2025 and this pick.
8. The Minnesota Wild's third-round pick went to the Montreal Canadiens as the result of a trade July 1, 2023, that sent Joel Edmundson to Washington in exchange for a seventh-round pick in 2024 and this pick.
  Washington previously acquired this pick as the result of a trade on February 28, 2023, that sent Marcus Johansson to Minnesota in exchange for this pick.
9. The Pittsburgh Penguins' third-round pick went to the Anaheim Ducks as the result of a trade on March 3, 2023, that sent Dmitry Kulikov to Pittsburgh in exchange for Brock McGinn and this pick.
10. The Washington Capitals' third-round pick went to the San Jose Sharks as the result of a trade on June 29, 2024, that sent Tampa Bay's third-round pick in 2024 (85th overall) and a sixth-round pick in 2025 to New Jersey in exchange for this pick.
  New Jersey previously acquired this pick as the result of a trade on June 29, 2024, that sent a third-round pick in 2024 (75th overall) to Washington in exchange for the a fifth-round pick in 2024 (146th overall) and this pick.
11. The New York Islanders' third-round pick went to the Vegas Golden Knights as the result of a trade on June 29, 2024, that sent Logan Thompson to Washington in exchange for a third-round pick in 2025 and this pick.
  Washington previously acquired this pick as the result of a trade on March 7, 2024, that sent Joel Edmundson to Toronto in exchange for a fifth-round pick in 2025 and this pick.
  Toronto previously acquired this pick as the result of a trade on February 28, 2023, that sent Pierre Engvall to New York in exchange for this pick.
12. The Vegas Golden Knights' third-round pick went to the Calgary Flames as the result of a trade on March 6, 2024, that sent Mikhail Vorobyev to Vegas in exchange for Daniil Miromanov, a conditional first-round pick in 2025 and this pick (being conditional at the time of the trade). The condition – Calgary will receive a third-round pick in 2024 if the Golden Knights do not advance to the 2024 Western Conference second round – was converted when Vegas was eliminated in the first round of the 2024 Stanley Cup playoffs on May 5, 2024.
  Vegas previously re-acquired this pick as the result of a trade on June 28, 2023, that sent Reilly Smith to Pittsburgh in exchange for this pick.
  Pittsburgh previously acquired this pick as the result of a trade on March 1, 2023, that sent Teddy Blueger to Vegas in exchange for Peter Diliberatore and this pick.
13. The Tampa Bay Lightning's third-round pick went to the New Jersey Devils as the result of a trade on June 29, 2024, that sent Washington's third-round pick in 2024 (82nd overall) to San Jose in exchange for a sixth-round pick in 2025 and this pick.
  San Jose previously acquired this pick as the result of a trade on March 7, 2024, that sent Anthony Duclair and a seventh-round pick in 2025 to Tampa Bay in exchange for Jack Thompson and this pick.
14. The Los Angeles Kings' third-round pick went to the Columbus Blue Jackets as the result of a trade on March 1, 2023, that sent Vladislav Gavrikov and Joonas Korpisalo to Los Angeles in exchange for Jonathan Quick, a conditional first-round pick in 2023 and this pick.
15. The Toronto Maple Leafs' third-round pick went to the Seattle Kraken as the result of a trade on March 20, 2022, that sent Colin Blackwell and Mark Giordano to Toronto in exchange for a second-round pick in both 2022 and 2023 and this pick.
16. The Colorado Avalanche's third-round pick went to Utah Hockey Club as the result of a trade on July 28, 2021, that sent Darcy Kuemper to Colorado in exchange for Conor Timmins, a conditional first-round pick in 2022 and this pick (being conditional at the time of the trade). The condition – Arizona will receive a third-round pick in 2024 if Colorado wins the 2022 Stanley Cup and Kuemper plays in 50% or more of their playoff games – was converted on June 26, 2022.
17. The Boston Bruins' third-round pick went to the Washington Capitals as the result of a trade on February 23, 2023, that sent Garnet Hathaway and Andrei Svetlakov to Boston in exchange for Craig Smith, a first-round pick in 2023, a second-round pick in 2025 and this pick.
18. The Winnipeg Jets' third-round pick went to the New Jersey Devils as the result of a trade on March 8, 2024, that sent Tyler Toffoli to Winnipeg in exchange for a second-round pick in 2025 and this pick.
19. The Carolina Hurricanes' third-round pick went to the Chicago Blackhawks as the result of a trade on June 29, 2024, that sent a third-round pick in 2025 to Carolina in exchange for this pick.
20. The Dallas Stars' third-round pick went to the Nashville Predators as the result of a trade on June 29, 2023, that sent a third-round pick in 2023 to Dallas in exchange for a sixth-round pick in 2024 and this pick.
21. The New York Rangers' third-round pick went to the St. Louis Blues as the result of a trade on February 9, 2023, that sent Niko Mikkola and Vladimir Tarasenko to New York in exchange for Sammy Blais, Hunter Skinner, a conditional first-round pick in 2023 and this pick (being conditional at the time of the trade). The condition – St. Louis will receive a third-round pick in 2024 if the Rangers qualify for the 2023 Stanley Cup playoffs – was converted on March 27, 2023.
22. The Edmonton Oilers' third-round pick went to Utah Hockey Club as the result of a trade on July 7, 2022, that sent Colorado's first-round pick in 2022 to Edmonton in exchange for Zack Kassian, a first-round pick in 2022, a second-round pick in 2025 and this pick.

=== Round four ===
Luke Osburn was selected 108th overall by the Buffalo Sabres.

Blake Montgomery was selected 117th overall by the Ottawa Senators.

#	Player	Nationality	NHL team	College/junior/club team
98	Gregor Biber (D)	Austria	Utah Hockey Club (from San Jose)^{1}	Rogle BK (J20 Nationell)
99	Jakub Milota (G)	Czech Republic	Nashville Predators (from Chicago via Tampa Bay)^{2}	Cape Breton Eagles (QMJHL)
100	Alexandre Blais (LW)	Canada	Anaheim Ducks	Rimouski Oceanic (QMJHL)
101	Tanner Henricks (D)	United States	Columbus Blue Jackets	Lincoln Stars (USHL)
102	Owen Protz (D)	Canada	Montreal Canadiens	Brantford Bulldogs (OHL)
103	Gabe Smith (C)	Canada	Utah Hockey Club	Moncton Wildcats (QMJHL)
104	Luke Ellinas (C)	Canada	Ottawa Senators	Kitchener Rangers (OHL)
105	Ollie Josephson (C)	Canada	Seattle Kraken	Red Deer Rebels (WHL)
106	Trevor Hoskin (C)	Canada	Calgary Flames	Cobourg Cougars (OJHL)
107	Heikki Ruohonen (C)	Finland	Philadelphia Flyers (from New Jersey via Vancouver and Calgary)^{3}	Kiekko-Espoo (U20 SM-sarja)
108	Luke Osburn (D)	United States	Buffalo Sabres	Youngstown Phantoms (USHL)
109	Kevin He (LW)	China	Winnipeg Jets (from Philadelphia via Buffalo)^{4}	Niagara IceDogs (OHL)
110	Elliott Groenewold (D)	United States	Boston Bruins (from Minnesota)^{5}	Cedar Rapids RoughRiders (USHL)
111	Chase Pietila (D)	United States	Pittsburgh Penguins	Michigan Tech Huskies (CCHA)
112	Javon Moore (LW)	United States	Ottawa Senators (from Detroit)^{6}	Minnetonka Skippers (USHS)
113	Tomas Mrsic (C)	Canada	St. Louis Blues	Medicine Hat Tigers (WHL)
114	Nicholas Kempf (G)	United States	Washington Capitals	U.S. NTDP (USHL)
115	Dmitry Gamzin (G)	Russia	New York Islanders	HC Zvezda Moscow (VHL)
116	Christian Kirsch (G)	Switzerland	San Jose Sharks (from Vegas)^{7}	EV Zug (U20-Elit)
117	Blake Montgomery (LW)	United States	Ottawa Senators (from Tampa Bay)^{8}	Lincoln Stars (USHL)
118	Jan Golicic (D)	Slovenia	Tampa Bay Lightning (from Los Angeles)^{9}	Gatineau Olympiques (QMJHL)
119	Raoul Boilard (C)	Canada	New York Rangers (from Nashville)^{10}	Baie-Comeau Drakkar (QMJHL)
120	Victor Johansson (D)	Sweden	Toronto Maple Leafs	Leksands IF (J20 Nationell)
121	Jake Fisher (C)	United States	Colorado Avalanche	Fargo Force (USHL)
122	Aron Kiviharju (D)	Finland	Minnesota Wild (from Boston)^{11}	HIFK (Liiga)
123	Simon-Pier Brunet (D)	Canada	Buffalo Sabres (from Winnipeg)^{12}	Drummondville Voltigeurs (QMJHL)
124	Alexander Siryatsky (D)	Russia	Carolina Hurricanes	Stalnye Lisy (MHL)
125	Riley Patterson (C)	Canada	Vancouver Canucks	Barrie Colts (OHL)
126	Landon Miller (G)	Canada	Detroit Red Wings (from Dallas)^{13}	Sault Ste. Marie Greyhounds (OHL)
127	Victor Norringer (LW)	Sweden	Nashville Predators (from NY Rangers)^{14}	Frolunda HC (J20 Nationell)
128	Hagen Burrows (C)	United States	Tampa Bay Lightning (from Edmonton via Nashville)^{15}	Minnetonka Skippers (USHS)
129	Simon Zether (C)	Sweden	Florida Panthers	Rogle BK (SHL)

Notes

1. The San Jose Sharks' fourth-round pick went to Utah Hockey Club as the result of a trade on July 28, 2021, that sent Lane Pederson to San Jose in exchange for this pick.
2. The Chicago Blackhawks' fourth-round pick went to the Nashville Predators as the result of a trade on June 29, 2023, that sent Tampa Bay's fourth-round pick in 2023 to Tampa Bay in exchange for this pick.
  Tampa Bay previously acquired this pick as the result of a trade on March 18, 2022, that sent Boris Katchouk, Taylor Raddysh, a conditional first-round pick in 2023 and 2024 to Chicago in exchange for Brandon Hagel, a fourth-round pick in 2022 and this pick.
3. The New Jersey Devils' fourth-round pick went to the Philadelphia Flyers as the result of a trade on June 29, 2024, that sent Los Angeles' fifth-round pick and St. Louis' sixth-round pick both in 2024 (150th and 177th overall) to Calgary in exchange for this pick.
  Calgary previously acquired this pick as the result of a trade on January 31, 2024, that sent Elias Lindholm to Vancouver in exchange for Hunter Brzustewicz, Joni Jurmo, Andrei Kuzmenko, a first-round pick in 2024 and this pick (being conditional at the time of the trade). The condition – Calgary will receive the higher of the fourth-round picks that Vancouver has in 2024 if the Canucks do not advance to the 2024 Western Conference final – was converted when Vancouver was eliminated from the 2024 Stanley Cup playoffs on May 20, 2024.
  Vancouver previously acquired this pick as the result of a trade on March 3, 2023, that sent Curtis Lazar to New Jersey in exchange for this pick.
4. The Philadelphia Flyers' fourth-round pick went to the Winnipeg Jets as the result of a trade on June 29, 2024, that sent a fourth and seventh-round pick both in 2024 (123rd and 219th overall) to Buffalo in exchange for this pick.
  Buffalo previously acquired this pick as the result of a trade on March 8, 2024, that sent Erik Johnson to Philadelphia in exchange for this pick.
5. The Minnesota Wild's fourth-round pick went to the Boston Bruins as the result of a trade on June 29, 2024, that sent Jakub Lauko and a fourth-round pick in 2024 (122nd overall) to Minnesota in exchange for Vinni Lettieri and this pick.
6. The Detroit Red Wings' fourth-round pick went to the Ottawa Senators as the result of a trade on July 9, 2023, that sent Alex DeBrincat to Detroit in exchange for Dominik Kubalik, Donovan Sebrango, a conditional first-round pick in 2024 and this pick.
7. The Vegas Golden Knights' fourth-round pick went to the San Jose Sharks as the result of a trade on August 29, 2022, that sent Adin Hill to Vegas in exchange for this pick.
8. The Tampa Bay Lightning's fourth-round pick went to the Ottawa Senators as the result of a trade on March 20, 2022, that sent Nick Paul to Tampa Bay in exchange for Mathieu Joseph and this pick.
9. The Los Angeles Kings' fourth-round pick went to the Tampa Bay Lightning as the result of a trade on June 29, 2024, that sent Tanner Jeannot to Los Angeles in exchange for a second-round pick in 2025 and this pick.
10. The Nashville Predators' fourth-round pick went to the New York Rangers as the result of a trade on June 29, 2024, that sent a fourth-round pick in 2024 (127th overall) and a seventh-round pick in 2026 to Nashville in exchange for this pick.
11. The Boston Bruins' fourth-round pick went to the Minnesota Wild as the result of a trade on June 29, 2024, that sent Vinni Lettieri and a fourth-round pick in 2024 (110th overall) to Boston in exchange for Jakub Lauko and this pick.
12. The Winnipeg Jets' fourth-round pick went to the Buffalo Sabres as the result of a trade on June 29, 2024, that sent Philadelphia's fourth-round pick (109th overall) to Winnipeg in exchange for a seventh-round pick in 2024 (219th overall) and this pick.
13. The Dallas Stars' fourth-round pick went to the Detroit Red Wings as the result of a trade on March 21, 2022, that sent Vladislav Namestnikov to Dallas in exchange for this pick.
14. The New York Rangers' fourth-round pick went to the Nashville Predators as the result of a trade on June 29, 2024, that sent a fourth-round pick in 2024 (119th overall) to New York in exchange for a seventh-round pick in 2026 and this pick.
15. The Edmonton Oilers' fourth-round pick went to the Tampa Bay Lightning as the result of a trade on May 21, 2024, that sent a seventh-round pick in 2024 and a second-round pick in 2025 to Nashville in exchange for Ryan McDonagh and this pick.
  Nashville previously acquired this pick as the result of a trade on February 28, 2023, that sent Mattias Ekholm and a sixth-round pick in 2024 to Edmonton in exchange for Tyson Barrie, Reid Schaefer, a first-round pick in 2023 and this pick.

=== Round five ===
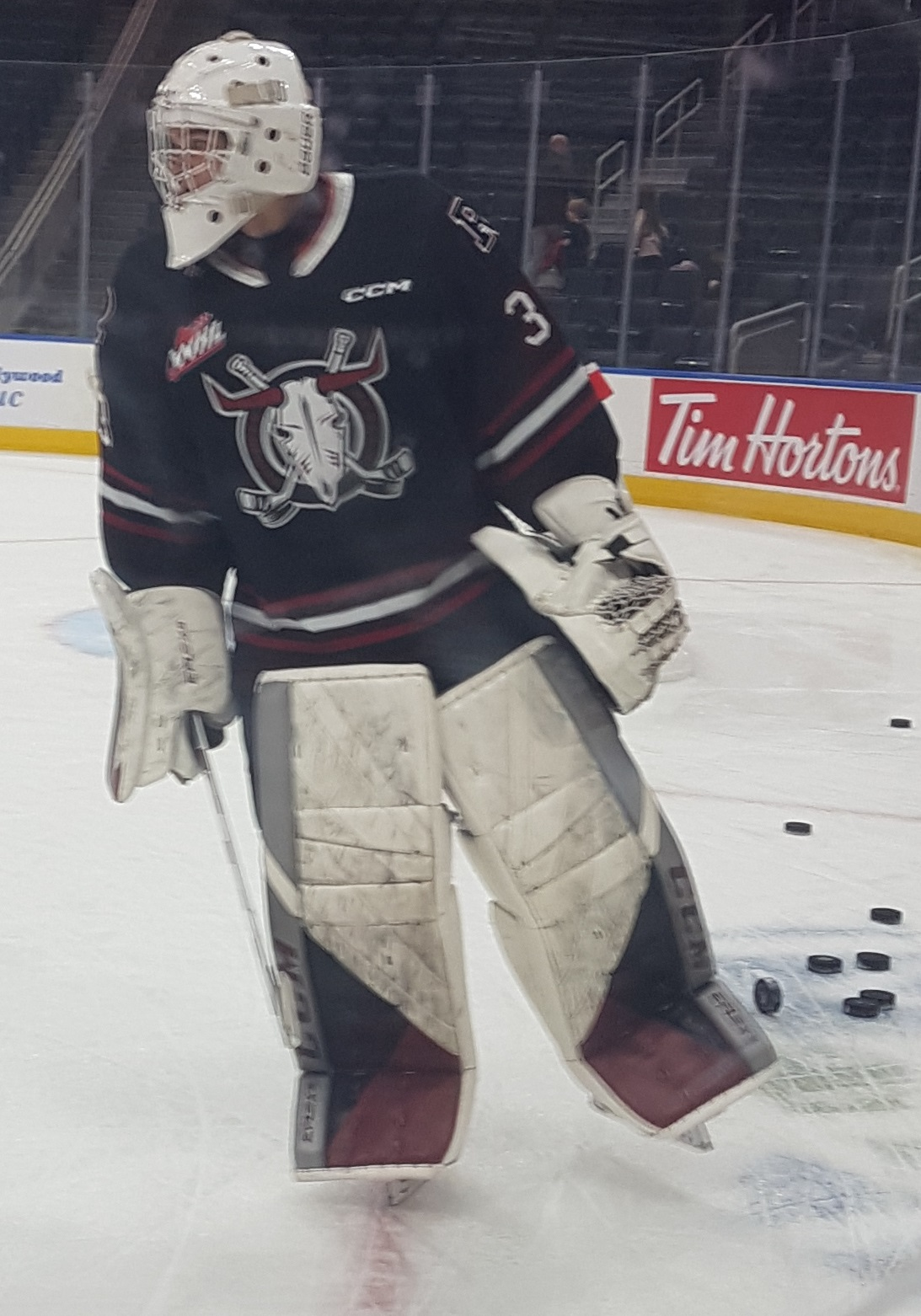
Chase Wutzke was selected 142nd overall by the Minnesota Wild.

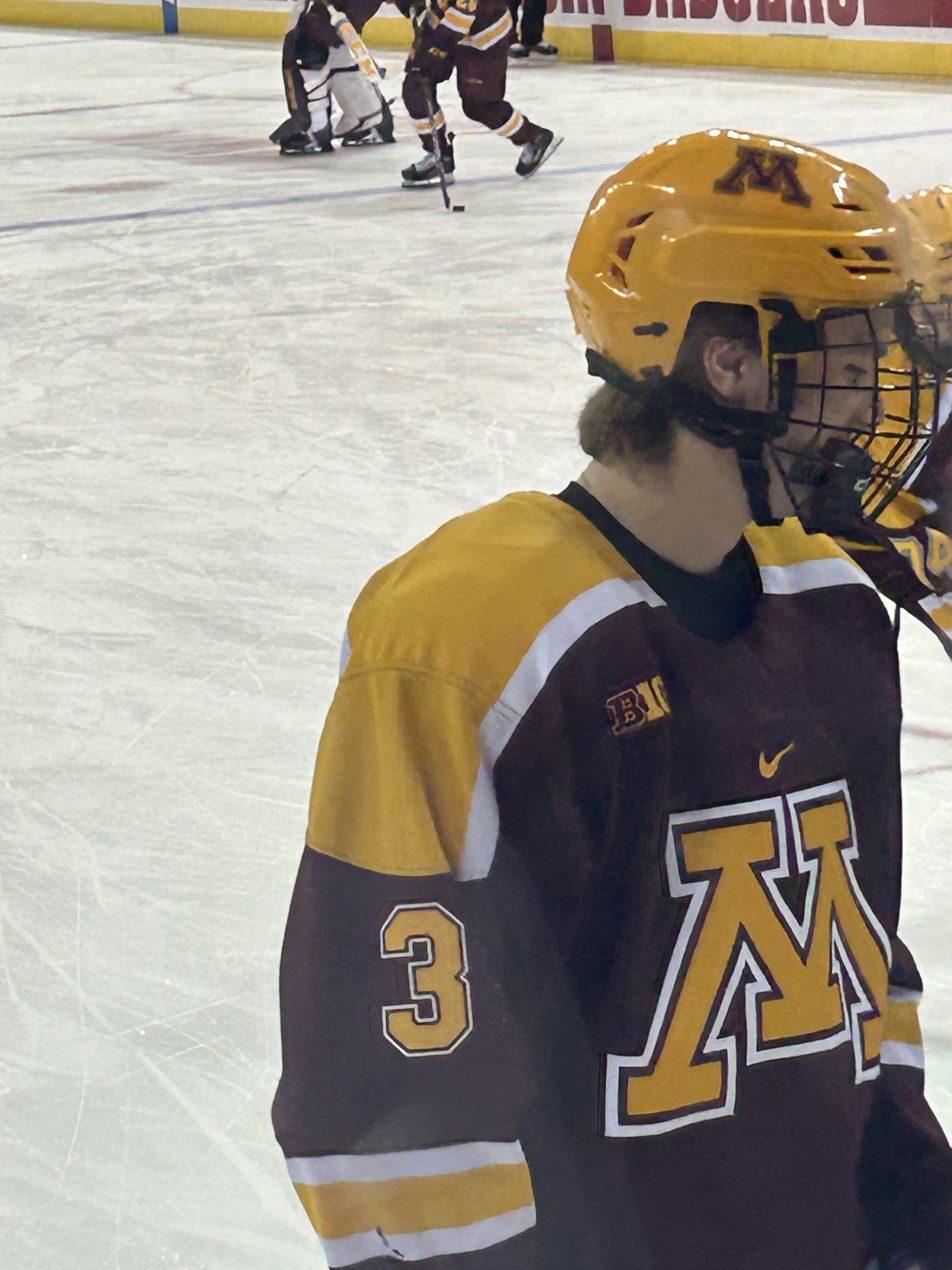
John Whipple was selected 144th overall by the Detroit Red Wings.

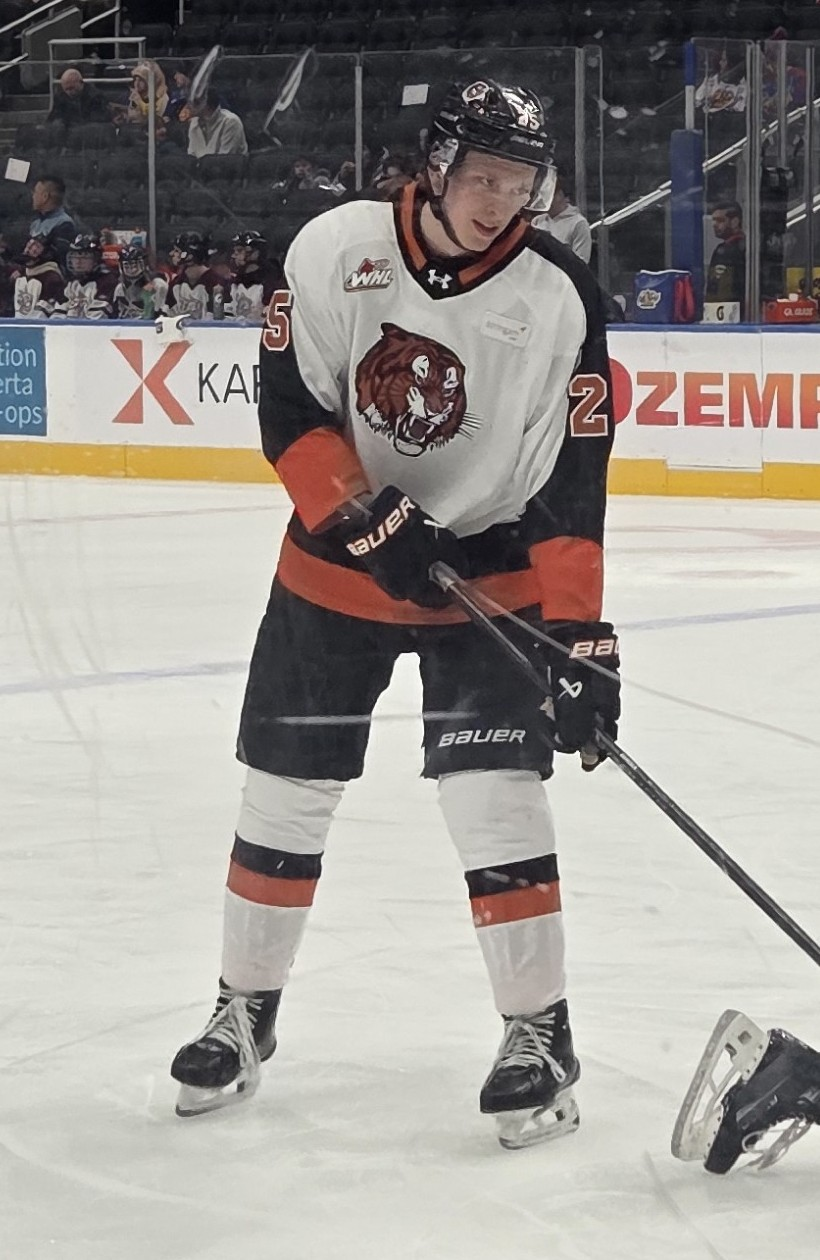
Niilopekka Muhonen was selected 158th overall by the Dallas Stars.

#	Player	Nationality	NHL team	College/junior/club team
130	Tyler Thorpe (RW)	Canada	Montreal Canadiens (from San Jose)^{1}	Vancouver Giants (WHL)
131	Colton Roberts (D)	Canada	San Jose Sharks (from Chicago via Vancouver and Calgary)^{2}	Vancouver Giants (WHL)
132	Louka Cloutier (G)	Canada	Colorado Avalanche (from Anaheim)^{3}	Chicago Steel (USHL)
133	Oskar Vuollet (C)	Sweden	Carolina Hurricanes (from Columbus)^{4}	Skelleftea AIK (J20 Nationell)
134	Mikus Vecvanags (G)	Latvia	Montreal Canadiens	HS Riga (OHL (Latvia))
135	Owen Allard (C)	Canada	Utah Hockey Club	Sault Ste. Marie Greyhounds (OHL)
136	Eerik Wallenius (D)	Finland	Ottawa Senators	HPK (Liiga)
137	Ivan Yunin (G)	Russia	Colorado Avalanche (from Seattle)^{5}	Omskie Yastreby (MHL)
138	Joel Svensson (LW)	Sweden	Chicago Blackhawks (from Calgary)^{6}	Vaxjo Lakers (J20 Nationell)
139	Max Graham (C)	Canada	New Jersey Devils	Kelowna Rockets (WHL)
140	Sebastian Soini (D)	Finland	Minnesota Wild (from Buffalo)^{7}	Ilves (U20 SM-sarja)
141	Clarke Caswell (LW)	Canada	Seattle Kraken (from Philadelphia via Florida)^{8}	Swift Current Broncos (WHL)
142	Chase Wutzke (G)	Canada	Minnesota Wild	Red Deer Rebels (WHL)
143	Nate Misskey (D)	Canada	San Jose Sharks (from Pittsburgh)^{9}	Victoria Royals (WHL)
144	John Whipple (D)	United States	Detroit Red Wings	U.S. NDTP (USHL)
145	William McIsaac (D)	Canada	St. Louis Blues	Spokane Chiefs (WHL)
146	Veeti Louhivaara (G)	Finland	New Jersey Devils (from Washington)^{10}	JYP (U20 SM-sarja)
147	Marcus Gidlof (G)	Sweden	New York Islanders	Leksands IF (J20 Nationell)
148	Noah Powell (LW)	United States	Philadelphia Flyers (from Vegas)^{11}	Dubuque Fighting Saints (USHL)
149	Joona Saarelainen (C)	Finland	Tampa Bay Lightning	KalPa (U20 SM-sarja)
150	Luke Misa (C)	Canada	Calgary Flames (from Los Angeles via Philadelphia)^{12}	Mississauga Steelheads (OHL)
151	Miroslav Holinka (C)	Czech Republic	Toronto Maple Leafs (from Nashville via Chicago)^{13}	HC Ocelari Trinec (Czech U20)
152	Alexander Plesovskikh (LW)	Russia	Toronto Maple Leafs	Mamonty Yugry (MHL)
153	Ales Cech (D)	Czech Republic	Utah Hockey Club (from Colorado via San Jose and New Jersey)^{14}	BK Mlada Boleslav (Czech Extraliga)
154	Jonathan Morello (C)	Canada	Boston Bruins	St. Michael's Buzzers (OJHL)
155	Markus Loponen (C)	Finland	Winnipeg Jets	Karpat (U20 SM-sarja)
156	Justin Poirier (RW)	Canada	Carolina Hurricanes	Baie-Comeau Drakkar (QMJHL)
157	Timofei Obvintsev (G)	Russia	Toronto Maple Leafs (from Vancouver)^{15}	Krasnaya Armiya (MHL)
158	Niilopekka Muhonen (D)	Finland	Dallas Stars	KalPa (U20 SM-sarja)
159	Nathan Aspinall (LW)	Canada	New York Rangers	Flint Firebirds (OHL)
160	Connor Clattenburg (LW)	Canada	Edmonton Oilers	Flint Firebirds (OHL)
161	Maxmilian Curran (C)	Czech Republic	Colorado Avalanche (from Florida via Buffalo)^{16}	Tri-City Americans (WHL)

==== Notes ====
1. The San Jose Sharks' fifth-round pick went to the Montreal Canadiens as the result of a trade on March 3, 2023, that sent Arvid Henrikson to San Jose in exchange for Nick Bonino and this pick.
2. The Chicago Blackhawks' fifth-round pick went to the San Jose Sharks as the result of a trade on March 8, 2024, that sent Nikita Okhotiuk to Calgary in exchange for this pick (being conditional at the time of the trade). The condition – San Jose will receive the highest of any fifth-round picks in 2024 that Chicago possess. – the date of conversion is unknown.
  Calgary previously acquired this pick as the result of a trade on November 30, 2023, that sent Nikita Zadorov to Vancouver in exchange for a third-round pick in 2026 and this conditional pick.
  Vancouver previously acquired this pick as the result of a trade on November 28, 2023, that sent Anthony Beauvillier to Chicago in exchange for this conditional pick.
3. The Anaheim Ducksꞌ fifth-round pick went to the Colorado Avalanche as the result of a trade on March 8, 2024, that sent Ben Meyers to Anaheim in exchange for this pick.
4. The Columbus Blue Jackets' fifth-round pick went to the Carolina Hurricanes as the result of a trade on June 29, 2024, that sent a second-round pick in 2024 (60th overall) to Columbus in exchange for a third-round pick in 2024 (69th overall) and this pick.
5. The Seattle Kraken's fifth-round pick went to the Colorado Avalanche as the result of a trade on December 16, 2023, that sent Tomas Tatar to Seattle in exchange for this pick.
6. The Calgary Flames' fifth-round pick went to the Chicago Blackhawks as the result of a trade on March 21, 2022, that sent Ryan Carpenter to Calgary in exchange for this pick.
7. The Buffalo Sabres' fifth-round pick went to the Minnesota Wild as the result of a trade on March 3, 2023, that sent Jordan Greenway to Buffalo in exchange for Vegas' second-round pick in 2023 and this pick.
8. The Philadelphia Flyers' fifth-round pick went to the Seattle Kraken as the result of a trade on June 29, 2024, that sent a sixth and seventh-round pick both in 2024 (169th and 201st overall) to Florida in exchange for this pick.
  Florida previously acquired this pick as the result of a trade on March 19, 2022, that sent Owen Tippett, a third-round pick in 2023 and a conditional first-round pick in 2024 to Philadelphia in exchange for Connor Bunnaman, Claude Giroux, German Rubtsov and this pick.
9. The Pittsburgh Penguins' fifth-round pick went to the San Jose Sharks as the result of a trade on March 3, 2023, that sent Tony Sund to Pittsburgh in exchange for a seventh-round pick in 2023 and this pick (being conditional at the time of the trade). The condition – San Jose will receive a fifth-round pick in 2024 if the Penguins do not qualify for the 2023 Eastern Conference Final – was converted on April 12, 2023.
10. The Washington Capitals' fifth-round pick went to the New Jersey Devils as the result of a trade on June 29, 2024, that sent a third-round pick in 2024 (75th overall) to Washington in exchange for a third-round pick in 2024 (82nd overall) and this pick.
11. The Vegas Golden Knightsꞌ fifth-round pick went to the Philadelphia Flyers as the result of a trade on March 6, 2024, that sent Noah Hanifin to Vegas in exchange for this pick.
12. The Los Angeles Kings' fifth-round pick went to the Calgary Flames as the result of a trade on June 29, 2024, that sent New Jersey's fourth-round pick in 2024 (107th overall) to Philadelphia in exchange for St. Louis' sixth-round pick in 2024 (177th overall) and this pick.
  Philadelphia previously acquired this pick as the result of a trade on March 3, 2023, that sent Zack MacEwen to Los Angeles in exchange for Brendan Lemieux and this pick.
13. The Nashville Predators' fifth-round pick went to the Toronto Maple Leafs as the result of a trade on February 27, 2023, that sent Joey Anderson, Pavel Gogolev, a conditional first-round pick in 2025 and a second-round pick in 2026 to Chicago in exchange for Sam Lafferty, Jake McCabe, a conditional fifth-round pick in 2025 and this pick (being conditional at the time of the trade). The condition – Toronto will receive the lowest of any fifth-round picks in 2024 that Chicago possess. – the date of conversion is unknown.
  Chicago previously acquired this pick as the result of a trade on March 7, 2024, that sent Anthony Beauvillier to Nashville in exchange for this pick.
14. The Colorado Avalanche's fifth-round pick went to the Utah Hockey Club as the result of a trade on June 29, 2024, that sent Washington's second-round pick in 2024 (49th overall) and Edmonton's second-round pick in 2025 to New Jersey in exchange for John Marino and this pick.
  New Jersey previously acquired this pick as the result of a trade on February 26, 2023, that sent Andreas Johnsson, Shakir Mukhamadullin, Nikita Okhotiuk, Fabian Zetterlund, a conditional first-round pick in 2023, a conditional second-round pick in 2024 and a seventh-round pick in 2024 to San Jose in exchange for Zachary Emond, Scott Harrington, Santeri Hatakka, Timur Ibragimov, Timo Meier and this pick.
  San Jose previously acquired this pick as the result of a trade on March 21, 2022, that sent Andrew Cogliano to Colorado in exchange for this pick.
15. The Vancouver Canucks' fifth-round pick went to the Toronto Maple Leafs as the result of a trade on October 8, 2023, that sent Sam Lafferty to Vancouver in exchange for this pick.
16. The Florida Panthers' fifth-round pick went to the Colorado Avalanche as the result of a trade on June 29, 2024, that sent Utah's third-round pick in 2024 (71st overall) to Buffalo in exchange for a third-round pick 2024 (76th overall) and this pick.
  Buffalo previously acquired this pick as the result of a trade on March 8, 2024, that sent Kyle Okposo to Florida in exchange for Calle Sjalin and this pick (being conditional at the time of the trade). The condition – Buffalo will receive a fifth-round pick if the Panthers win the Stanley Cup in 2024 – was converted on June 24, 2024.

=== Round six ===
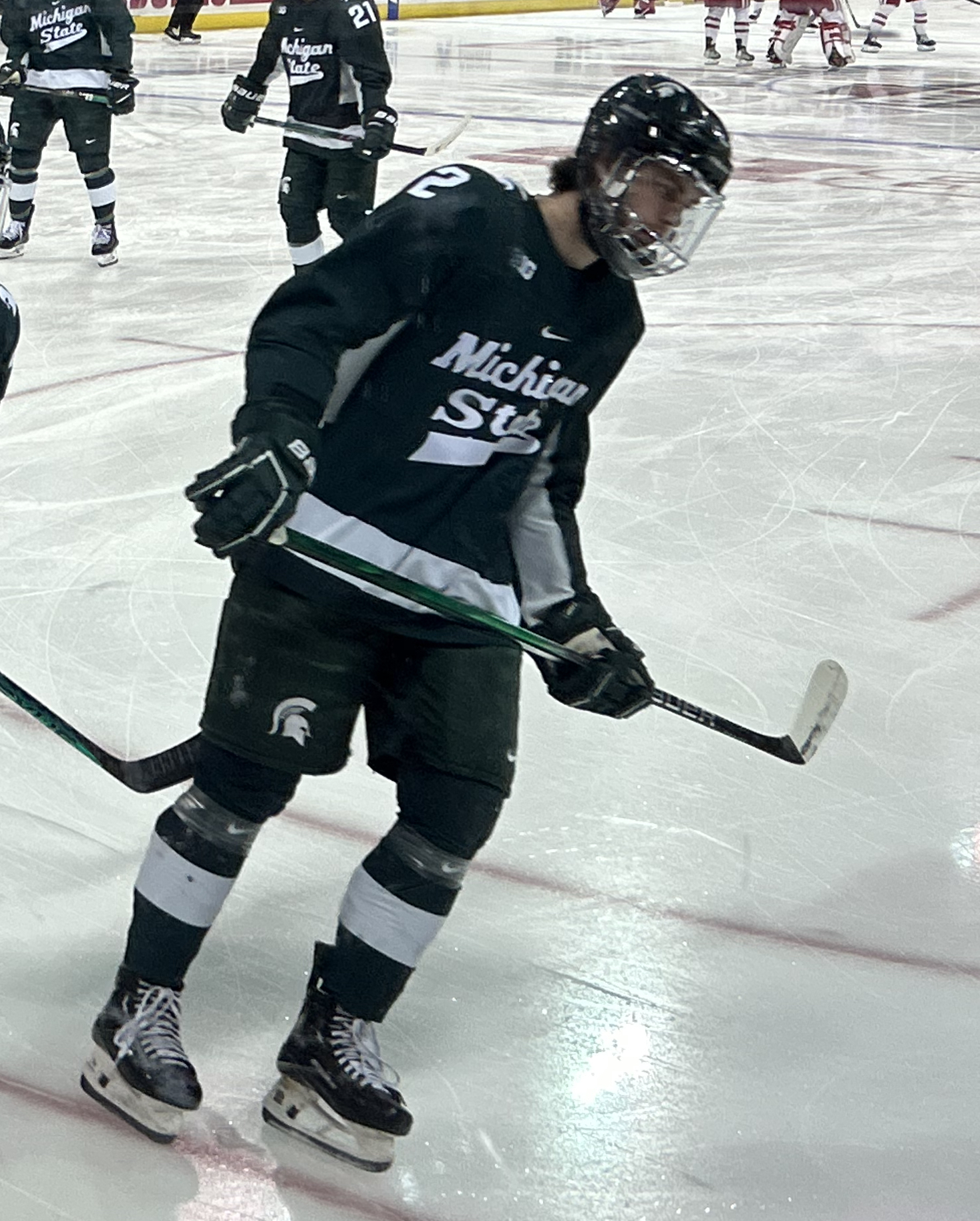
Patrick Geary was selected 172th overall by the Buffalo Sabres.

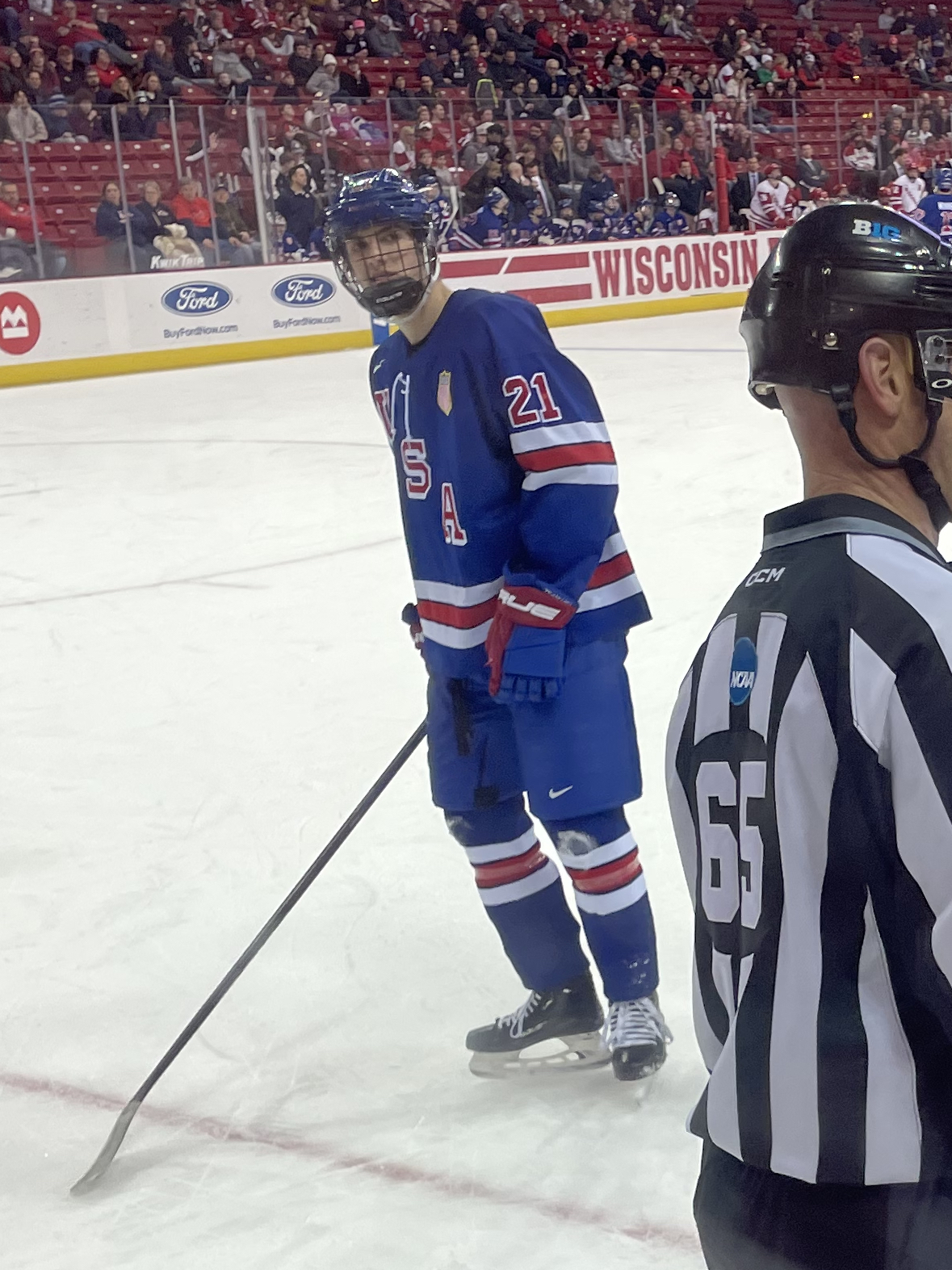
Austin Burnevik was selected 182nd overall by the Anaheim Ducks

#	Player	Nationality	NHL team	College/junior/club team
162	Anthony Romani (RW)	Canada	Vancouver Canucks (from San Jose)^{1}	North Bay Battalion (OHL)
163	Ty Henry (D)	Canada	Chicago Blackhawks	Erie Otters (OHL)
164	Jared Woolley (D)	Canada	Los Angeles Kings (from Anaheim)^{2}	London Knights (OHL)
165	Luke Ashton (D)	Canada	Columbus Blue Jackets	Langley Rivermen (BCHL)
166	Ben Merrill (C)	United States	Montreal Canadiens	Saint Sebastian's Arrows (USHS)
167	Vojtech Hradec (C)	Czech Republic	Utah Hockey Club	BK Mlada Boleslav (Czech Extraliga)
168	Timur Kol (D)	Russia	Carolina Hurricanes (from Ottawa)^{3}	Omskie Yastreby (MHL)
169	Stepan Gorbunov (C)	Russia	Florida Panthers (from Seattle)^{4}	Belye Medvedi Chelyabinsk (MHL)
170	Hunter Laing (C)	Canada	Calgary Flames	Prince George Cougars (WHL)
171	Matyas Melovsky (C)	Czech Republic	New Jersey Devils	Baie-Comeau Drakkar (QMJHL)
172	Patrick Geary (D)	United States	Buffalo Sabres	Michigan State Spartans (Big Ten)
173	Ilya Pautov (RW)	Russia	Philadelphia Flyers	Krasnaya Armiya (MHL)
174	Stevie Leskovar (D)	Canada	Minnesota Wild	Mississauga Steelheads (OHL)
175	Joona Vaisanen (D)	Finland	Pittsburgh Penguins	Dubuque Fighting Saints (USHL)
176	Charlie Forslund (LW)	Sweden	Detroit Red Wings	Falu IF (Hockeyettan)
177	Eric Jamieson (D)	Canada	Calgary Flames (from St. Louis via Philadelphia)^{5}	Everett Silvertips (WHL)
178	Petr Sikora (C)	Czech Republic	Washington Capitals	HC Ocelari Trinec (Czech U20)
179	Xavier Veilleux (D)	Canada	New York Islanders	Muskegon Lumberjacks (USHL)
180	Trent Swick (LW)	Canada	Vegas Golden Knights	Kitchener Rangers (OHL)
181	Kaden Pitre (C)	Canada	Tampa Bay Lightning	Flint Firebirds (OHL)
182	Austin Burnevik (RW)	United States	Anaheim Ducks (from Los Angeles)^{6}	Madison Capitols (USHL)
183	Albin Sundin (D)	Sweden	Edmonton Oilers (from Nashville)^{7}	Frolunda HC (J20 Nationell)
184	Roman Shokhrin (D)	Russia	Carolina Hurricanes (from Toronto)^{8}	Loko Yaroslavl (MHL)
185	Tory Pitner (D)	United States	Colorado Avalanche	Youngstown Phantoms (USHL)
186	Loke Johansson (D)	Sweden	Boston Bruins	AIK IF (J20 Nationell)
187	Kieron Walton (C)	Canada	Winnipeg Jets	Sudbury Wolves (OHL)
188	Fyodor Avramov (LW)	Russia	Carolina Hurricanes	Kapitan Stupino (MHL)
189	Parker Alcos (D)	Canada	Vancouver Canucks	Edmonton Oil Kings (WHL)
190	Ludvig Lafton (D)	Norway	Utah Hockey Club (from Dallas via Nashville)^{9}	Farjestad BK (J20 Nationell)
191	Rico Gredig (LW)	Switzerland	New York Rangers	HC Davos (National League)
192	Dalyn Wakely (C)	Canada	Edmonton Oilers	North Bay Battalion (OHL)
193	Hunter St. Martin (LW)	Canada	Florida Panthers	Medicine Hat Tigers (WHL)

==== Notes ====
1. The San Jose Sharks' sixth-round pick went to the Vancouver Canucks as the result of a trade on December 15, 2023, that sent Jack Studnicka to San Jose in exchange for Nick Cicek and this pick.
2. The Anaheim Ducks' sixth-round pick went to the Los Angeles Kings as the result of a trade on June 29, 2024, that sent a sixth and seventh-round pick both in 2024 (182nd and 214th overall) to Anaheim in exchange for this pick.
3. The Ottawa Senators' sixth-round pick went to the Carolina Hurricanes as the result of a trade on March 15, 2024, that sent Jamieson Rees to Ottawa in exchange for this pick.
4. The Seattle Kraken's sixth-round pick went to the Florida Panthers as the result of a trade on June 29, 2024, that sent Philadelphia's fifth-round pick in 2024 (141st overall) to Seattle in exchange for a seventh-round pick both in 2024 (201st overall) and this pick.
5. The St. Louis Blues' sixth-round pick went to the Calgary Flames as the result of a trade on June 29, 2024, that sent New Jersey's fourth-round pick in 2024 (107th overall) to Philadelphia in exchange for Los Angeles' fifth-round pick in 2024 (150th overall) this pick.
  Philadelphia previously acquired this pick as the result of a trade on June 27, 2023, that sent Kevin Hayes to St. Louis in exchange for this pick.
6. The Los Angeles Kings' sixth-round pick went to the Anaheim Ducks as the result of a trade on June 29, 2024, that sent a sixth-round pick in 2024 (164th overall) to Los Angeles in exchange for a seventh-round pick in 2024 (214th overall) and this pick.
7. The Nashville Predators' sixth-round pick went to the Edmonton Oilers as the result of a trade on February 28, 2023, that sent Tyson Barrie, Reid Schaefer, a first-round pick in 2023 and a fourth-round pick in 2024 to Nashville in exchange for Mattias Ekholm and this pick.
8. The Toronto Maple Leafs' sixth-round pick went to the Carolina Hurricanes as the result of a trade on February 29, 2024, that sent Ilya Lyubushkin to Toronto in exchange for this pick.
9. The Dallas Stars' sixth-round pick went to Utah Hockey Club as the result of a trade on March 8, 2024, that sent Jason Zucker to Nashville in exchange for this pick.
  Nashville previously acquired this pick as the result of a trade on June 29, 2023, that sent a third-round pick in 2023 to Dallas in exchange for a third-round pick in 2024 and this pick.

=== Round seven ===
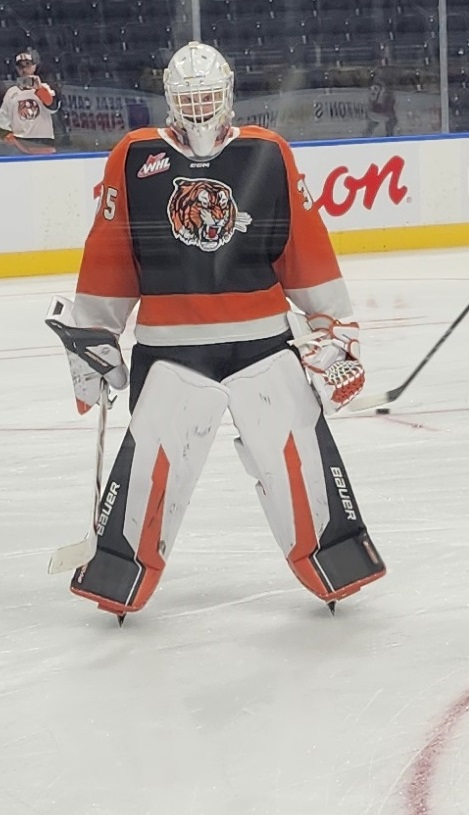
Harrison Meneghin was selected 206th overall by the Tampa Bay Lightning.

Erik Pahlsson was selected 213 overall by the Nashville Predators

#	Player	Nationality	NHL team	College/junior/club team
194	Yaroslav Korostelyov (G)	Russia	San Jose Sharks	SKA-1946 (MHL)
195	Joe Connor (LW)	United States	Tampa Bay Lightning (from Chicago)^{1}	Muskegon Lumberjacks (USHL)
196	William Nicholl (C)	Canada	Edmonton Oilers (from Anaheim)^{2}	London Knights (OHL)
197	Lucas Van Vliet (C)	United States	Vegas Golden Knights (from Columbus)^{3}	U.S. NTDP (USHL)
198	James Reeder (RW)	United States	Los Angeles Kings (from Montreal)^{4}	Dubuque Fighting Saints (USHL)
199	Noah Steen (LW)	Norway	Tampa Bay Lightning (from Utah)^{5}	Mora IK (HockeyAllsvenskan)
200	Matt Lahey (D)	Canada	Toronto Maple Leafs (from Ottawa)^{6}	Nanaimo Clippers (BCHL)
201	Denis Gabdrakhmanov (G)	Russia	Florida Panthers (from Seattle)^{7}	Tyumensky Legion (MHL)
202	Jakub Fibigr (D)	Czech Republic	Seattle Kraken (from Calgary)^{8}	Mississauga Steelheads (OHL)
203	Austin Baker (LW)	United States	Detroit Red Wings (from New Jersey via San Jose)^{9}	U.S. NTDP (USHL)
204	Vasili Zelenov (RW)	Russia	Buffalo Sabres	Red Bull Hockey Juniors (AlpsHL)
205	Austin Moline (D)	United States	Philadelphia Flyers	Shattuck-Saint Mary's Sabres (USHS)
206	Harrison Meneghin (G)	Canada	Tampa Bay Lightning (from Minnesota)^{10}	Lethbridge Hurricanes (WHL)
207	Mac Swanson (LW)	United States	Pittsburgh Penguins	Fargo Force (USHL)
208	Fisher Scott (D)	United States	Detroit Red Wings	Dubuque Fighting Saints (USHL)
209	Antoine Dorion (C)	Canada	St. Louis Blues	Quebec Remparts (QMJHL)
210	Makar Khanin (RW)	Russia	Montreal Canadiens (from Washington)^{11}	HC Dinamo Saint Petersburg (MHL)
211	Matvei Korotky (C)	Russia	St. Louis Blues (from NY Islanders)^{12}	SKA-1946 (MHL)
212	Miroslav Satan Jr. (C)	Slovakia	Washington Capitals (from Vegas)^{13}	HC Slovan Bratislava (Slovakia U20)
213	Erik Pahlsson (C)	Sweden	Nashville Predators (from Tampa Bay)^{14}	Dubuque Fighting Saints (USHL)
214	Darels Uljanskis (D)	Latvia	Anaheim Ducks (from Los Angeles)^{15}	AIK IF (J20 Nationell)
215	Christian Humphreys (C)	United States	Colorado Avalanche (from Nashville via New Jersey)^{16}	U.S. NTDP (USHL)
216	Sam McCue (LW)	Canada	Toronto Maple Leafs	Owen Sound Attack (OHL)
217	Nikita Prishchepov (C)	Russia	Colorado Avalanche	Victoriaville Tigres (QMJHL)
218	Bauer Berry (D)	United States	Edmonton Oilers (from Boston via Utah)^{17}	Muskegon Lumberjacks (USHL)
219	Ryerson Leenders (G)	Canada	Buffalo Sabres (from Winnipeg)^{18}	Mississauga Steelheads (OHL)
220	Andrey Krutov (LW)	Russia	Carolina Hurricanes	Chaika Nizhny Novgorod (MHL)
221	Basile Sansonnens (D)	Switzerland	Vancouver Canucks	HC Fribourg-Gottéron (U20-Elit)
222	William Samuelsson (C)	Sweden	Dallas Stars	Sodertalje SK (J20 Nationell)
223	Finn Harding (D)	Canada	Pittsburgh Penguins (from NY Rangers)^{19}	Mississauga Steelheads (OHL)
224	Rasmus Bergqvist (D)	Sweden	Montreal Canadiens (from Edmonton)^{20}	Skelleftea AIK (J20 Nationell)
225	Nathan Mayes (D)	Canada	Toronto Maple Leafs (from Florida)^{21}	Spokane Chiefs (WHL)

==== Notes ====
1. The Chicago Blackhawks' seventh-round pick went to the Tampa Bay Lightning as the result of a trade on June 29, 2023, that sent Corey Perry to Chicago in exchange for this pick.
2. The Anaheim Ducks' seventh-round pick went to the Edmonton Oilers as the result of a trade on March 6, 2024, that sent a first-round pick in 2024 and a conditional fifth-round pick in 2025 to Anaheim in exchange for Sam Carrick, Ty Taylor and this pick.
3. The Columbus Blue Jackets' seventh-round pick went to the Vegas Golden Knights as the result of a trade on June 29, 2023, that sent a seventh-round pick in 2023 to Columbus in exchange for this pick.
4. The Montreal Canadiens' seventh-round pick went to the Los Angeles Kings as the result of a trade on June 28, 2024, that sent a first-round pick in 2024 (21st overall) to Montreal in exchange for Winnipeg's first-round pick in 2024 (26th overall), Colorado's second-round pick in 2024 (57th overall) and this pick.
5. The Utah Hockey Club's seventh-round pick went to the Tampa Bay Lightning as the result of a trade on June 29, 2024, that sent Mikhail Sergachev to Utah in exchange for Conor Geekie, J.J. Moser, Toronto's second-round pick in 2025 and this pick.
6. The Ottawa Senators' seventh-round pick went to the Toronto Maple Leafs as the result of a trade on July 11, 2022, that sent future considerations to Ottawa in exchange for Matt Murray, a third-round pick in 2023 and this pick.
7. The Seattle Kraken's seventh-round pick went to the Florida Panthers as the result of a trade on June 29, 2024, that sent Philadelphia's fifth-round pick in 2024 (141st overall) to Seattle in exchange for a sixth-round pick both in 2024 (169th overall) this pick.
8. The Calgary Flames' seventh-round pick went to the Seattle Kraken as the result of a trade on March 16, 2022, that sent Calle Jarnkrok to Calgary in exchange for Florida's second-round pick in 2022, a third-round pick in 2023 and this pick.
9. The New Jersey Devils' seventh-round pick went to the Detroit Red Wings as the result of a trade on March 8, 2024, that sent Klim Kostin to San Jose in exchange for Radim Simek and this pick.
  San Jose previously acquired this pick as the result of a trade on February 26, 2023, that sent Zachary Emond, Scott Harrington, Santeri Hatakka, Timur Ibragimov, Timo Meier and Colorado's fifth-round pick in 2024 to New Jersey in exchange for Andreas Johnsson, Shakir Mukhamadullin, Nikita Okhotiuk, Fabian Zetterlund, a conditional first-round pick in 2023, a conditional second-round pick in 2024 and this pick.
10. The Minnesota Wild's seventh-round pick went to the Tampa Bay Lightning as the result of a trade on July 2, 2023, that sent Patrick Maroon and Maxim Čajkovič to Minnesota in exchange for this pick.
11. The Washington Capitals' seventh-round pick went to the Montreal Canadiens as the result of a trade on July 1, 2023, that sent Joel Edmundson to Washington in exchange for Minnesota's third-round pick in 2024 and this pick.
12. The New York Islanders' seventh-round pick went to the St. Louis Blues as the result of a trade December 8, 2023, that sent Robert Bortuzzo to New York in exchange for this pick.
13. The Vegas Golden Knights' seventh-round pick went to the Washington Capitals as the result of a trade on June 29, 2024, that sent a sixth-round pick in 2025 to Vegas in exchange for this pick.
14. The Tampa Bay Lightning's seventh-round pick went to the Nashville Predators as the result of a trade on May 21, 2024, that sent Ryan McDonagh and Edmonton's fourth-round pick in 2024 to Tampa Bay in exchange for a second-round pick in 2025 and this pick.
15. The Los Angeles Kings' seventh-round pick went to the Anaheim Ducks as the result of a trade on June 29, 2024, that sent a sixth-round pick in 2024 (164th overall) to Los Angeles in exchange for a sixth-round pick in 2024 (182nd overall) and this pick.
16. The Nashville Predators' seventh-round pick went to the Colorado Avalanche as the result of a trade on March 1, 2024, that sent Kurtis MacDermid to New Jersey in exchange for Zakhar Bardakov and this pick.
  New Jersey previously acquired this pick as the result of a trade on June 29, 2023, that sent a seventh-round pick in 2023 to Nashville in exchange for this pick.
17. The Boston Bruins' seventh-round pick went to the Edmonton Oilers as the result of a trade on March 7, 2024, that sent a fourth-round pick in 2027 to the Utah Hockey Club in exchange for Troy Stecher and this pick.
  The Arizona Coyotes previously acquired this pick as the result of a trade on February 22, 2022, that sent Michael Callahan to Boston in exchange for this pick.
18. The Winnipeg Jets' seventh-round pick went to the Buffalo Sabres as the result of a trade on June 29, 2024, that sent Philadelphia's fourth-round pick (109th overall) to Winnipeg in exchange for a fourth-round pick both in 2024 (123rd overall) and this pick.
19. The New York Rangers' seventh-round pick went to the Pittsburgh Penguins as the result of a trade on June 29, 2023, that sent New Jersey's third-round pick in 2023 to New York in exchange for Colorado's third-round pick in 2023 and this pick.
20. The Edmonton Oilers' seventh-round pick went to the Montreal Canadiens as the result of a trade on March 21, 2022, that sent Brett Kulak to Edmonton in exchange for William Lagesson, a conditional second-round pick in 2022 and this pick.
21. The Florida Panthers' seventh-round pick went to the Toronto Maple Leafs as the result of a trade on June 29, 2024, that sent Boston's second-round pick in 2024 (58th overall) to Florida in exchange for a second-round pick in 2025 and this pick.

== Draftees based on nationality ==
Rank	Country	Selections	Percent	Top selection
	North America	127	56.4%	
1	Canada	89	39.6%	Macklin Celebrini, 1st
2	United States	38	16.9%	Zeev Buium, 12th
	Eurasia	98	43.6%	
3	Russia	27	12%	Ivan Demidov, 5th
4	Sweden	22	9.8%	Lucas Pettersson, 35th
5	Finland	18	8%	Konsta Helenius, 14th
6	Czech Republic	13	5.8%	Adam Jiricek, 16th
7	Norway	4	1.8%	Michael Brandsegg-Nygard, 15th
7	Switzerland	4	1.8%	Leon Muggli, 52nd
9	Belarus	3	1.3%	Artyom Levshunov, 2nd
9	Latvia	3	1.3%	Eriks Mateiko, 90th
11	Austria	1	0.4%	Gregor Biber, 98th
11	China	1	0.4%	Kevin He, 109th
11	Slovenia	1	0.4%	Jan Golicic, 118th
11	Slovakia	1	0.4%	Miroslav Satan Jr., 212th

=== North American draftees by state/province ===
Rank	State/province	Selections	Percent	Top selection
1	Ontario	43	19.1%	Beckett Sennecke, 3rd
2	British Columbia	19	8.4%	Macklin Celebrini, 1st
3	Quebec	11	4.9%	Sacha Boisvert, 18th
4	Alberta	7	3.6%	Carter Yakemchuk, 7th
4	Minnesota	8	3.6%	Adam Kleber, 42nd
6	Saskatchewan	5	2.2%	Berkly Catton, 8th
6	Michigan	5	2.2%	Lukas Fischer, 56th
8	California	4	1.8%	Zeev Buium, 12th
8	Illinois	4	1.8%	Kamil Bednarik, 61st
10	Massachusetts	3	1.3%	Cole Eiserman, 20th
11	New Brunswick	2	0.9%	Spencer Gill, 59th
11	New York	2	0.9%	Patrick Geary, 172nd
13	Missouri	1	0.4%	Cole Hutson, 43rd
13	Ohio	1	0.4%	AJ Spellacy, 72nd
13	Vermont	1	0.4%	Elliott Groenewold, 110th
13	Maryland	1	0.4%	Blake Montgomery, 117th
13	Yukon	1	0.4%	Max Graham, 139th
13	Manitoba	1	0.4%	Clarke Caswell, 141st
13	New Jersey	1	0.4%	John Whipple, 144th
13	Connecticut	1	0.4%	Tory Pitner, 185th
13	New Hampshire	1	0.4%	Joe Connor, 195th
13	Nevada	1	0.4%	Austin Moline, 205th
13	Alaska	1	0.4%	Mac Swanson, 207th
13	Colorado	1	0.4%	Fisher Scott, 208th
13	Pennsylvania	1	0.4%	Christian Humphreys, 215th
13	North Dakota	1	0.4%	Bauer Berry, 218th

== Broadcasting ==
In Canada, coverage of the draft was televised on Sportsnet and TVA Sports.

In the United States, coverage of the opening day of the draft was televised on ESPN and ESPN+. Coverage of the second day of the draft was televised on NHLN and ESPN+.

== See also ==
- 2021–22 NHL transactions
- 2022–23 NHL transactions
- 2023–24 NHL transactions
- 2024–25 NHL transactions
- 2024–25 NHL season
- List of first overall NHL draft picks
- List of NHL players
