= Stian Solberg =

Norwegian ice hockey player (born 2005)

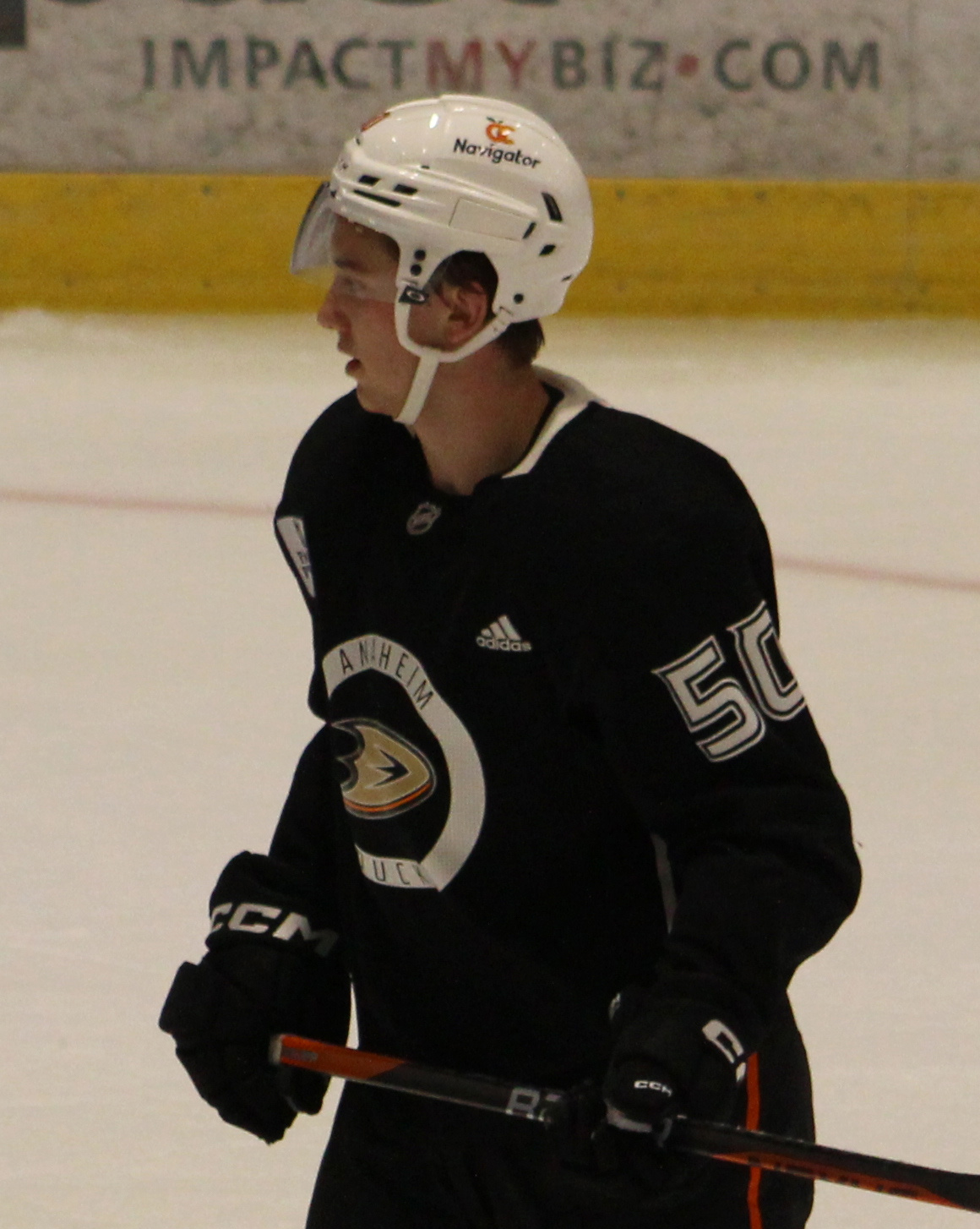
- Solberg in 2024
- Born: December 29, 2005 (age 20) Oslo, Norway
- Height: 6 ft 2 in (188 cm)
- Weight: 207 lb (94 kg; 14 st 11 lb)
- Position: Defence
- Shoots: Left
- NHL team Former teams: Anaheim Ducks; Vålerenga Ishockey; Färjestad BK
- National team: Norway
- NHL draft: 23rd overall, 2024; Anaheim Ducks
- Playing career: 2021–present

Stian Solberg (born December 29, 2005) is a Norwegian professional ice hockey player who is a defenceman for the Anaheim Ducks of the National Hockey League (NHL). He was drafted 23rd overall by the Ducks in the 2024 NHL entry draft, becoming the second Norwegian ever selected in the first round, following Michael Brandsegg-Nygård eight picks earlier in the same draft.

== Playing career ==
Solberg grew up playing soccer, and began playing hockey at a rink adjacent to the soccer field. He began playing defence at 14, when a teammate urinated in the shower and the coach gave Solberg his roster spot as punishment. Playing his junior career with Vålerenga Ishockey, he made his debut with their senior club in the EliteHockey Ligaen (EHL) as a fifteen-year-old.

In the 2022–23 season, Solberg recorded a goal and three assists in 18 EHL games. He was selected 96th overall by the Regina Pats in the 2023 Canadian Hockey League (CHL) import draft. Despite being drafted into the CHL and receiving offers from multiple Swedish clubs, Solberg chose to remain in Norway for the 2023–24 season, signing a one-year contract with Vålerenga.

In the regular season, he recorded 15 points in 42 games, adding nine points in 17 playoff games on a run to the league finals. In April 2024, he signed a two-year contract with Färjestad BK of the Swedish Hockey League (SHL). Entering the 2024 NHL entry draft, Solberg stood out for his elite physicality, fluid skating, and aggressive yet patient play. Initially seen as a fringe choice to be picked in the first round, his projection improved dramatically in the months leading up to the draft, and by the month of the draft he was seen as a potential top-15 pick. He would ultimately be selected 23rd overall by the Anaheim Ducks, becoming the second Norwegian ever selected in the first round, after former Vålerenga teammate Michael Brandsegg-Nygård was taken 15th overall that same day. He signed an entry-level contract with the Ducks on July 5.

== International play ==
Medal record

Men's ice hockey

Representing Norway

World Championships
| Bronze medal – third place | 2026 Switzerland | |

Making his World Championship debut at the Norway at the 2024 World Championship, Solberg was the youngest player at the tournament. In a lopsided 4–1 preliminary round loss to Canada that saw the Norwegians held without a shot for nearly 42 minutes, Solberg scored the team's lone goal. He would finish the tournament with two goals and an assist and be named one of Norway's top three players at the event.

== Career statistics ==
=== Regular season and playoffs ===
| | | | Regular season | | | | | Playoffs |
| Season | Team | League | GP | G | A | Pts | PIM | GP | G | A | Pts | PIM |
|---|---|---|---|---|---|---|---|---|---|---|---|---|
| 2021–22 | Vålerenga | NOR U20 | 11 | 2 | 6 | 8 | 4 | — | — | — | — | — |
| 2021–22 | Vålerenga | NOR | 11 | 0 | 1 | 1 | 2 | — | — | — | — | — |
| 2022–23 | Vålerenga | NOR U20 | 2 | 2 | 3 | 5 | 0 | 3 | 1 | 1 | 2 | 0 |
| 2022–23 | Vålerenga | NOR | 18 | 1 | 3 | 4 | 10 | — | — | — | — | — |
| 2023–24 | Vålerenga | NOR | 42 | 5 | 10 | 15 | 47 | 17 | 2 | 7 | 9 | 35 |
| 2024–25 | Färjestad BK | SHL | 47 | 3 | 9 | 12 | 16 | — | — | — | — | — |
| 2024–25 | San Diego Gulls | AHL | 10 | 2 | 3 | 5 | 2 | — | — | — | — | — |
| 2025–26 | San Diego Gulls | AHL | 71 | 12 | 12 | 24 | 102 | 2 | 0 | 0 | 0 | 0 |
| NOR totals | | | 71 | 6 | 14 | 20 | 59 | 17 | 2 | 7 | 9 | 35 |
| SHL totals | | | 47 | 3 | 9 | 12 | 16 | — | — | — | — | — |

=== International ===
| Year | Team | Event | Result | GP | G | A | Pts | PIM |
|---|---|---|---|---|---|---|---|---|
| 2022 | Norway | WJC (Div IA) | 13th | 5 | 0 | 0 | 0 | 6 |
| 2023 | Norway | U18 | 9th | 6 | 0 | 1 | 1 | 4 |
| 2024 | Norway | WJC | 10th | 5 | 1 | 1 | 2 | 4 |
| 2024 | Norway | WC | 11th | 7 | 2 | 1 | 3 | 8 |
| 2024 | Norway | OGQ | DNQ | 3 | 0 | 2 | 2 | 4 |
| 2025 | Norway | WJC (Div IA) | 13th | 5 | 1 | 0 | 1 | 4 |
| 2025 | Norway | WC | 12th | 7 | 4 | 2 | 6 | 14 |
| 2026 | Norway | WC | 3rd place, bronze medalist(s) | 10 | 1 | 1 | 2 | 12 |
| Junior totals | | | | 21 | 2 | 2 | 4 | 18 |
| Senior totals | | | | 27 | 7 | 6 | 13 | 38 |

Awards and achievements
| Preceded by Beckett Sennecke | Anaheim Ducks first-round draft pick 2024 | Succeeded by Roger McQueen |
