= Michael Brandsegg-Nygård =

Norwegian ice hockey player (born 2005)

- Born: 5 October 2005 (age 21) Oslo, Norway
- Height: 185 cm (6 ft 1 in)
- Weight: 92.5 kg (204 lb; 14 st 8 lb)
- Position: Forward
- Shoots: Right
- NHL team Former teams: Detroit Red Wings; Vålerenga Ishockey; Skellefteå AIK
- National team: Norway
- NHL draft: 15th overall, 2024; Detroit Red Wings
- Playing career: 2021–present

Michael Brandsegg-Nygård (born 5 October 2005) is a Norwegian professional ice hockey player who is a forward for the Detroit Red Wings of the National Hockey League (NHL). He was drafted 15th overall by the Red Wings in the 2024 NHL entry draft, becoming the first Norwegian ever selected in the first round.

== Early life ==
Michael Brandsegg-Nygård was born and raised in Oslo, Norway, where his father Kjell Richard Nygård played for Vålerenga of EliteHockey Ligaen. His father also played for Norway's national team. Brandsegg-Nygård is close friends with Stian Solberg, with whom he played as a youth in Vålerenga's system. After Brandsegg-Nygård, Solberg was selected by the Anaheim Ducks to become the second-ever Norwegian first-round draft choice.

== Playing career ==
Brandsegg-Nygård made his senior professional debut for Vålerenga Ishockey of Norway's EliteHockey Ligaen (EHL) as a 16 year old, appearing in eight EHL games in addition to playing at the under-20 level. He was offered a spot in the system of Swedish club Mora IK midway through the year, but chose to remain in Norway until the season ended.

Turning down an offer of a full time EHL role with Vålerenga, Brandsegg-Nygård joined Mora for the 2022–23 season, appearing in 11 games in the second-tier HockeyAllsvenskan and 35 in the J20 Nationell. He made his Allsvenskan debut a week after turning 17, on 12 October 2022, and scored his first goal in the league against Tingsryds AIF on 7 November 2022.

In his draft-eligible season, Brandsegg-Nygård once again split time between the professional and junior levels, recording eight goals and ten assists in 41 Allsvenskan games. His shot, hockey IQ, and mature game were among the features lauded by scouts, who projected him as a first round pick and possibly "the best prospect Norway has ever produced."

On 17 May 2024, Swedish Hockey League (SHL) club Skellefteå AIK announced that they had signed Brandsegg-Nygård to a one-year contract. On 28 June 2024, at the 2024 NHL entry draft, he was selected 15th overall by the Detroit Red Wings, becoming the first Norwegian player selected in the first round. Two weeks later, on 11 July, he signed a three-year, entry-level contract with the Red Wings. For the 2024–25 season, he was on loan to Skellefteå. In hopes of winning the Le Mat Trophy, Brandsegg-Nygård chose to return to Sweden instead of playing for the Grand Rapids Griffins, the Red Wings' American Hockey League (AHL) affiliate. After Skellefteå was eliminated in the semifinals of the SHL playoffs, Brandsegg-Nygård went to the United States to play for the Griffins.

== International play ==
Medal record

Representing Norway

Men's ice hockey

World Championships
Bronze medal – third place	2026 Switzerland	

Brandsegg-Nygård made his senior international debut at the 2022 MECA Hockey Games, appearing against Latvia and Denmark as a 17 year old.

At Division I A of the 2023 World Junior Championships, Brandsegg-Nygård and the Norway junior team finished in first, earning promotion to the top division for the first time in nearly 10 years.

Returning to Norway's team for the 2024 World Junior Championships, he had three goals and five points in five games, with an average of 17:22 of time on ice. In the relegation match against Germany junior team, Norway lost 5–4 in overtime to be sent back to Division I A.

In his senior-level team debut at the 2024 World Championship, Brandsegg-Nygård was the third youngest player, behind teammate Stian Solberg and Finnish forward Konsta Helenius. He finished the tournament with three goals and five points in seven games, with each of his goals coming off assists from Mats Zuccarello.

== Career statistics ==
=== Regular season and playoffs ===
			Regular season					Playoffs
Season	Team	League	GP	G	A	Pts	PIM	GP	G	A	Pts	PIM
2020–21	Vålerenga	NOR U21	2	0	2	2	0	—	—	—	—	—
2021–22	Vålerenga	NOR	8	0	0	0	0	1	0	0	0	0
2021–22	Vålerenga	NOR U20	25	24	18	42	20	4	2	4	6	4
2022–23	Mora IK	Allsv	11	1	2	3	6	—	—	—	—	—
2022–23	Mora IK	J20	35	17	21	38	28	—	—	—	—	—
2023–24	Mora IK	Allsv	41	8	10	18	19	12	4	6	10	8
2023–24	Mora IK	J20	7	5	7	12	10	—	—	—	—	—
2024–25	Skellefteå AIK	SHL	42	5	6	11	51	11	4	2	6	12
2024–25	Grand Rapids Griffins	AHL	2	0	0	0	2	3	2	1	3	4
2025–26	Detroit Red Wings	NHL	14	0	1	1	2	—	—	—	—	—
2025–26	Grand Rapids Griffins	AHL	60	20	24	44	42	8	4	4	8	10
SHL totals			42	5	6	11	51	11	4	2	6	12
NHL totals			14	0	1	1	2	—	—	—	—	—

=== International ===
Year	Team	Event	Result	GP	G	A	Pts	PIM
2022	Norway	U18 (Div IA)	2nd place, silver medalist(s)	5	2	2	4	4
2023	Norway	WJC (Div IA)	1st place, gold medalist(s)	5	2	3	5	10
2024	Norway	WJC	10th	5	3	2	5	0
2024	Norway	WC	11th	7	3	2	5	2
2024	Norway	OGQ	DNQ	3	2	0	2	6
2025	Norway	WJC (Div IA)	3rd place, bronze medalist(s)	5	1	0	1	6
2025	Norway	WC	12th	5	0	4	4	29
2026	Norway	WC	3rd place, bronze medalist(s)	5	3	3	6	4
Junior totals				20	8	7	15	20
Senior totals				20	8	9	17	41

== Awards and honours ==
Award	Year	Ref
AHL
Top Prospects Team	2026	

Awards and achievements
Preceded by Axel Sandin-Pellikka	Detroit Red Wings first-round draft pick 2024	Succeeded by Carter Bear
