= Zachary Emond =

Canadian ice hockey goaltender

Zachary Émond
- Born: 20 June 2000 (age 26) St-Cyprien, Quebec, Canada
- Height: 6 ft 3 in (191 cm)
- Weight: 181 lb (82 kg; 12 st 13 lb)
- Position: Goaltender
- Catches: Left
- EHL team Former teams: Stavanger Oilers; San Jose Barracuda; HC '05 Banská Bystrica; Pelicans
- NHL draft: 176th overall, 2018; San Jose Sharks
- Playing career: 2021–present

Zachary Émond (born June 20, 2000) is a Canadian professional ice hockey goaltender currently playing for the Stavanger Oilers of the Norwegian Elitehockey Ligaen. He was drafted in the sixth round, 176th overall, by the San Jose Sharks in the 2018 NHL Entry Draft.

== Playing career ==
=== Junior ===
Émond played major junior hockey in the Quebec Maritimes Junior Hockey League (QMJHL), primarily for the Rouyn-Noranda Huskies. During the 2018–19 season, serving as the primary backup to Samuel Harvey, Émond posted historically dominant depth statistics. He recorded a 24–0–1 record in 30 appearances, capturing the Jacques Plante Memorial Trophy for the league's lowest goals-against average (GAA) at 1.73, alongside an elite .932 save percentage. He was a member of the dominant Huskies squad that won both the QMJHL President's Cup and the 2019 Memorial Cup national championship.

He took over starting duties for the Huskies during the 2019–23 cycles before being traded to the Saint John Sea Dogs mid-way through his final overage junior season in 2020–21.

=== Professional ===
Having already signed a three-year, entry-level contract with the San Jose Sharks following his draft selection, Émond turned professional ahead of the 2021–22 season. He spent his initial pro years transitioning within the Sharks' farm system, appearing in 12 games for their American Hockey League (AHL) affiliate, the San Jose Barracuda, and logging minutes in the ECHL with the Orlando Solar Bears.

In November 2022, the Sharks reassigned Émond to the ECHL's Wichita Thunder, where he posted a 3–1–0 record with a 2.22 GAA in 4 games before later spending a portion of the season under contract with the Utica Comets organization.

For the 2023–24 and 2024–25 seasons, Émond found stability with the ECHL's Trois-Rivières Lions in his home province of Quebec. During the 2024–25 campaign, he recorded an impressive 10–3–0 record with a 2.21 GAA and a .927 save percentage in 13 games with the Lions. On February 12, 2025, Émond chose to take his career overseas, leaving the ECHL to sign with Slovak Extraliga club HC Banska Bystrica. He made a brief, spectacular impression in Slovakia, winning both of his starts while stopping 52 of 53 shots for a microscopic 0.50 GAA and .981 save percentage.

On June 24, 2025, Émond signed a one-year contract with the Pelicans of the Finnish Liiga for the 2025–26 season. He appeared in 17 games for the Lahti-based club, registering a 4–9–2 record, a 2.83 GAA, and one shutout. Following the conclusion of his season in Finland, on May 7, 2026, Émond signed a contract to join the Stavanger Oilers in Norway for the 2026–27 European calendar year.

== Career statistics ==
Season	Team	League	Regular season									Playoffs							
Season	Team	League	GP	W	L	T/OT	MIN	GA	SO	GAA	SV%	GP	W	L	MIN	GA	SO	GAA	SV%
2016–17	Rouyn-Noranda Huskies	QMJHL	1	0	0	0	32	2	0	3.77	.867	—	—	—	—	—	—	—	—
2017–18	Rouyn-Noranda Huskies	QMJHL	24	9	10	1	1285	70	1	3.27	.897	—	—	—	—	—	—	—	—
2018–19	Rouyn-Noranda Huskies	QMJHL	30	24	0	1	1633	47	7	1.73	.932	—	—	—	—	—	—	—	—
2019–20	Rouyn-Noranda Huskies	QMJHL	53	25	23	4	2983	161	3	3.24	.908	—	—	—	—	—	—	—	—
2020–21	Rouyn-Noranda Huskies	QMJHL	14	3	9	1	765	47	0	3.69	.881	—	—	—	—	—	—	—	—
2020–21	Saint John Sea Dogs	QMJHL	14	8	4	1	761	44	0	3.47	.888	6	3	3	364	21	0	3.46	.888
2021–22	San Jose Barracuda	AHL	12	3	4	2	536	40	0	4.48	.867	—	—	—	—	—	—	—	—
2021–22	Orlando Solar Bears	ECHL	13	6	4	1	646	39	0	3.62	.879	—	—	—	—	—	—	—	—
2022–23	Wichita Thunder	ECHL	4	3	1	0	243	9	0	2.22	.936	—	—	—	—	—	—	—	—
2023–24	Trois-Rivières Lions	ECHL	17	9	7	1	940	44	3	2.81	.907	4	2	2	250	12	0	2.88	.896
2024–25	Trois-Rivières Lions	ECHL	13	10	3	0	788	29	1	2.21	.927	—	—	—	—	—	—	—	—
2024–25	HC Banska Bystrica	SloEL	2	2	0	0	120	1	0	0.50	.981	—	—	—	—	—	—	—	—
2025–26	Pelicans	Liiga	17	4	9	2	933	44	1	2.83	.894	—	—	—	—	—	—	—	—

Stat lines verified via Elite Prospects, Liiga official tracking, and AHL league profiles.
