= Xhekaj =

Xhekaj is a surname. Notable people with the surname include:

- Arber Xhekaj (born 2001), Canadian ice hockey player
- Florian Xhekaj (born 2004), Canadian ice hockey player
