= David Goyette =

Canadian ice hockey player (born 2004)

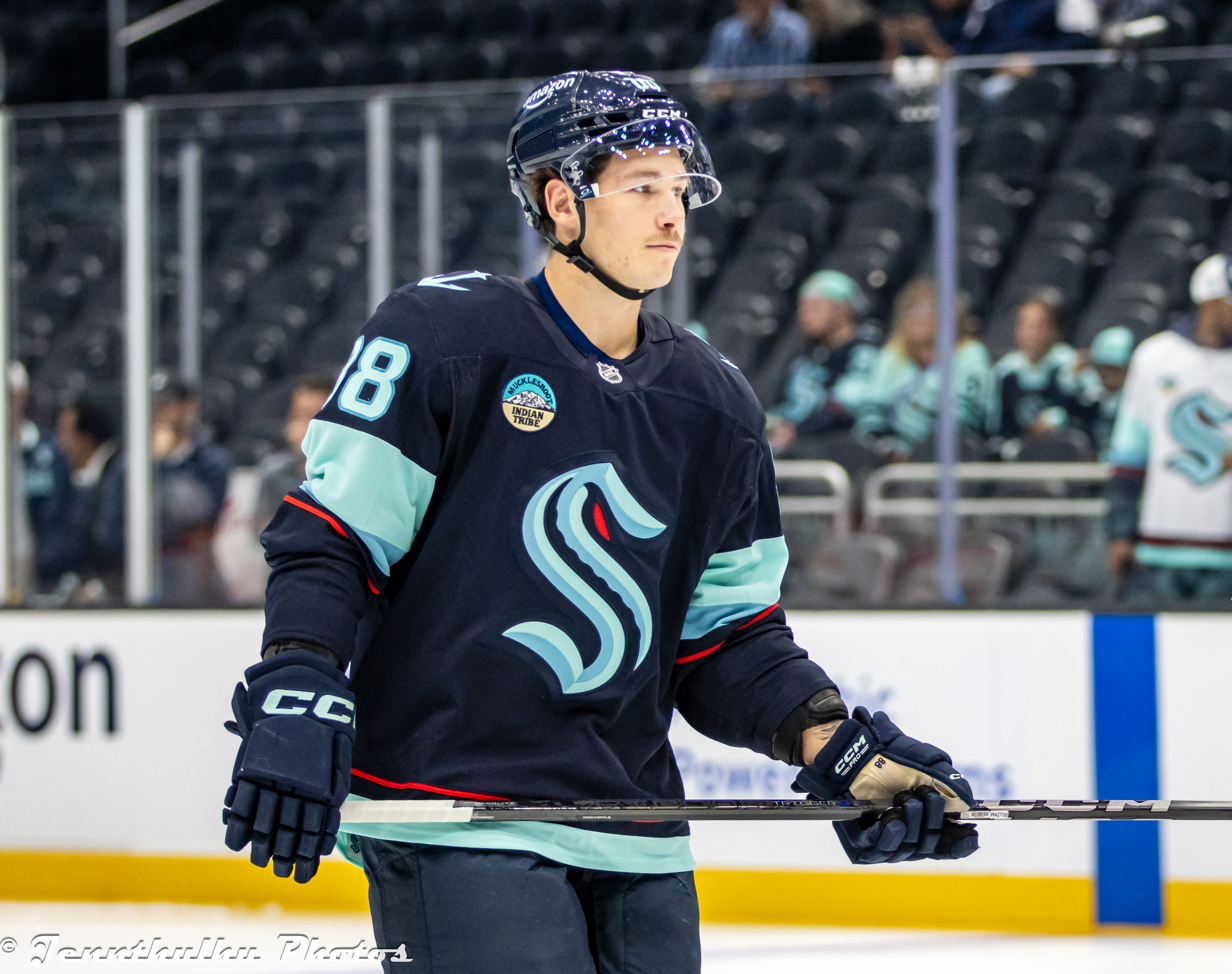
- Goyette with the Seattle Kraken in 2024
- Born: March 27, 2004 (age 22) Saint-Jérôme, Quebec, Canada
- Height: 5 ft 10 in (178 cm)
- Weight: 172 lb (78 kg; 12 st 4 lb)
- Position: Centre
- Shoots: Left
- NHL team (P) Cur. team: Philadelphia Flyers; Lehigh Valley Phantoms (AHL)
- NHL draft: 61st overall, 2022; Seattle Kraken
- Playing career: 2023–present

David Goyette (born March 27, 2004) is a Canadian professional ice hockey player for the Lehigh Valley Phantoms of the American Hockey League (AHL) as a prospect to the Philadelphia Flyers of the National Hockey League (NHL).

== Playing career ==
Goyette was taken 11th overall in the 2020 Ontario Hockey League (OHL) priority selection draft by the Sudbury Wolves, and made his debut in the 2021–22 season. He appeared in 66 games, recording 33 goals and 40 assists. Goyette was then drafted by the Seattle Kraken at 61st overall in the second round of the 2022 NHL entry draft.

In the 2022–23 season, Goyette was named an alternate captain for the Sudbury Wolves and improved his scoring by averaging 1.46 points per game, with 41 goals and 51 assists. He also agreed to a three-year, entry-level contract with the Kraken on April 10, 2023.

Goyette enjoyed great success in the 2023–24 season, aided by teammate Quentin Musty and the addition of St. Louis Blues prospect Dalibor Dvorský from the Swedish Hockey League. With the help of Musty and Dvorský, he hit the 100-point threshold for the first time. He finished the regular season with 117 points in 68 games played. Goyette was named to the OHL's Third All-Star Team, before the Wolves were swept in the second round by the North Bay Battalion.

For the 2024–25 season, the Kraken decided not to return Goyette to the Sudbury Wolves, instead opting to send him to the AHL affiliate the Coachella Valley Firebirds. In his first AHL season, he put up 6 goals and 12 assists in 54 games.

On February 17, 2026, the AHL announced that they had suspended Goyette 20 games for violating the league's performance enhancing substance program.

On October 1, 2026, Goyette was traded to the Philadelphia Flyers for Devin Kaplan.

== Career statistics ==
=== Regular season and playoffs ===
			Regular season					Playoffs
Season	Team	League	GP	G	A	Pts	PIM	GP	G	A	Pts	PIM
2021–22	Sudbury Wolves	OHL	66	33	40	73	33	—	—	—	—	—
2022–23	Sudbury Wolves	OHL	63	41	51	92	43	4	1	3	4	6
2022–23	Coachella Valley Firebirds	AHL	2	0	0	0	0	7	0	2	2	2
2023–24	Sudbury Wolves	OHL	68	40	77	117	29	9	5	5	10	9
2023–24	Coachella Valley Firebirds	AHL	1	0	0	0	2	—	—	—	—	—
2024–25	Coachella Valley Firebirds	AHL	54	6	12	18	20	4	0	1	1	0
2025–26	Coachella Valley Firebirds	AHL	51	3	7	10	73	—	—	—	—	—
AHL totals			108	9	19	28	95	11	0	3	3	2

=== International ===
Year	Team	Event	Result	GP	G	A	Pts	PIM
2022	Canada	U18	5th	4	1	2	3	0
Junior totals				4	1	2	3	0

== Awards and honours ==
Award	Year	Ref
CHL
Second All-Star Team	2024	
OHL
Eddie Powers Memorial Trophy	2024	
Jim Mahon Memorial Trophy	2024	
Third All-Star Team	2024	
