= 2023–24 OHL season =

- League: Ontario Hockey League
- Sport: Hockey
- Duration: Preseason; August 2023 – September 2023; Regular season September 28, 2023 – March 24, 2024; Playoffs; March 28, 2024 – May 15, 2024
- Teams: 20
- TV partner(s): Rogers TV; YourTV; TSN

Draft
- Top draft pick: Matthew Schaefer
- Picked by: Erie Otters

Regular season
- Hamilton Spectator Trophy: London Knights (6)
- Season MVP: Easton Cowan (London Knights)
- Top scorer: David Goyette (Sudbury Wolves)

Playoffs
- Playoffs MVP: Easton Cowan (Knights)
- Finals champions: London Knights (5)
- Runners-up: Oshawa Generals

OHL seasons
- 2022–23 2024–25

2023–24 CHL season
- League: Canadian Hockey League
- Sport: Hockey
- Duration: OHL; September 2023 – May 2024; QMJHL; September 2023 – May 2024; WHL; September 2023 – May 2024
- Teams: 60
- TV partner(s): RDS; TSN; CBC; Rogers TV; Shaw TV
- Season MVP: Jagger Firkus (Moose Jaw Warriors) (WHL)
- Top scorer: Jagger Firkus (Moose Jaw Warriors) (WHL)

Memorial Cup
- Finals champions: Saginaw Spirit (OHL) (1st title)
- Runners-up: London Knights (OHL)

The 2023–24 OHL season was the 44th season of operation (43rd season of play) of the Ontario Hockey League. The league played a 68-game regular season which began on September 28, 2023 and concluded on March 24, 2024. The post-season began on March 28, 2024 and concluded on May 15, 2024.

The London Knights won the J. Ross Robertson Cup and represented the Ontario Hockey League at the 2024 Memorial Cup. The Saginaw Spirit hosted 2024 Memorial Cup, which was held at the Dow Event Center in Saginaw, Michigan. Saginaw and London faced each other in the Memorial Cup Final, with Saginaw winning 4–3 to win their first Memorial Cup in franchise history, as well as becoming only the third American team to win the Memorial Cup.

== Off-season ==
=== Relocation ===
On February 7, 2023, the Hamilton Bulldogs announced that the club would be moving to Brantford, Ontario, for three seasons due to renovations and the long-term closure of First Ontario Centre beginning this season. The team also announced that the team would be known as the Brantford Bulldogs and play at the Brantford Civic Centre.

== Pre-season ==
On July 7, 2023, the OHL announced the preseason schedule for the 2023–24 season. In total, there were 48 preseason games which began on September 1 and concluded on September 23.

Neutral site games were played in Ayr, Beamsville, Cornwall, Hanover, Millbrook, Norwood, Ohsweken, Port Hope and St. Thomas.

OHL training camps began in late August in preparation of the 2023-24 season, which began on September 28, 2023.

== Regular season ==
=== Relocation ===
On January 31, 2024, the Mississauga Steelheads announced plans for the club to relocate to Brampton, Ontario for the 2024-25 OHL season. The relocated team will play at the CAA Centre and is now known as the Brampton Steelheads. Previously, Brampton hosted the Brampton Battalion in the OHL from 1998-2013 until the franchise relocated to North Bay, Ontario.

On June 13, 2024, the OHL Board of Governors approved the relocation and officially announced the team will be known as the Brampton Steelheads.

=== Final standings ===
Note: DIV = Division; GP = Games played; W = Wins; L = Losses; OTL = Overtime losses; SL = Shootout losses; GF = Goals for; GA = Goals against;
PTS = Points; x = clinched playoff berth; y = clinched division title; z = clinched conference title
Standings as of March 24, 2024

==== Eastern conference ====
Rank	Team	DIV	GP	W	L	OTL	SOL	Pts	ROW	GF	GA
1	z-Oshawa Generals	East	68	40	19	7	2	89	39	273	204
2	y-North Bay Battalion	Central	68	39	20	7	2	87	39	300	240
3	x-Brantford Bulldogs	East	68	37	20	9	2	85	36	267	243
4	x-Mississauga Steelheads	Central	68	38	22	8	0	84	37	248	212
5	x-Sudbury Wolves	Central	68	38	23	4	3	83	37	328	272
6	x-Ottawa 67's	East	68	36	24	6	2	80	35	253	228
7	x-Kingston Frontenacs	East	68	33	31	4	0	70	32	247	272
8	x-Barrie Colts	Central	68	28	36	4	0	60	23	234	283
9	Peterborough Petes	East	68	20	40	7	1	48	19	183	296
10	Niagara IceDogs	Central	68	17	43	6	2	42	17	193	323

==== Western conference ====
Rank	Team	DIV	GP	W	L	OTL	SOL	Pts	ROW	GF	GA
1	z-London Knights	Midwest	68	50	14	1	3	104	48	322	197
2	y-Saginaw Spirit	West	68	50	16	1	1	102	50	303	215
3	x-Sault Ste. Marie Greyhounds	West	68	45	18	3	2	95	42	286	215
4	x-Kitchener Rangers	Midwest	68	41	23	4	0	86	41	290	225
5	x-Erie Otters	Midwest	68	33	28	5	2	73	30	254	270
6	x-Guelph Storm	Midwest	68	33	28	6	1	73	30	210	225
7	x-Owen Sound Attack	Midwest	68	29	30	6	3	67	28	246	274
8	x-Flint Firebirds	West	68	30	33	4	1	65	28	232	274
9	Sarnia Sting	West	68	25	39	3	1	54	21	204	292
10	Windsor Spitfires	West	68	18	42	5	3	44	17	247	360

=== Scoring leaders ===
Note: GP = Games played; G = Goals; A = Assists; Pts = Points; PIM = Penalty minutes

Player	Team	GP	G	A	Pts	PIM
David Goyette	Sudbury Wolves	68	40	77	117	29
Anthony Romani	North Bay Battalion	68	58	53	111	20
Dalyn Wakely	North Bay Battalion	66	39	65	104	71
Quentin Musty	Sudbury Wolves	53	43	59	102	66
Denver Barkey	London Knights	64	35	67	102	28
Deni Goure	Owen Sound Attack	68	36	60	96	30
Easton Cowan	London Knights	54	34	62	96	64
Zayne Parekh	Saginaw Spirit	66	33	63	96	64
Carson Rehkopf	Kitchener Rangers	60	52	43	95	45
Hunter Brzustewicz	Kitchener Rangers	67	13	79	92	24

=== Leading goaltenders ===
Note: GP = Games played; Mins = Minutes played; W = Wins; L = Losses: OTL = Overtime losses;
SL = Shootout losses; GA = Goals Allowed; SO = Shutouts; GAA = Goals against average

Player	Team	GP	MINS	W	L	OTL	SOL	GA	SO	Sv%	GAA
Michael Simpson	London Knights	48	2776	34	10	1	1	121	4	0.905	2.61
Jacob Oster	Oshawa Generals	60	3569	35	16	7	1	168	3	0.905	2.82
Andrew Oke	Saginaw Spirit	41	2282	29	10	1	0	110	2	0.890	2.89
Jackson Parsons	Kitchener Rangers	51	2906	27	18	2	0	145	4	0.897	2.99
Collin MacKenzie	Ottawa 67's	31	1690	14	11	2	1	86	1	0.901	3.05

== Attendance ==
Team	Arena	Home Games	Avg. Attendance	Capacity	Cap. Percentage
London Knights	Budweiser Gardens	34	9,035	9,036	100.0%
Kitchener Rangers	Kitchener Memorial Auditorium	34	6,492	7,131	91.0%
Oshawa Generals	Tribute Communities Centre	34	5,109	5,180	98.6%
Guelph Storm	Sleeman Centre	34	4,704	4,715	99.8%
Windsor Spitfires	WFCU Centre	34	4,610	6,450	71.5%
Ottawa 67's	TD Place Arena	34	4,213	9,500	44.3%
Sarnia Sting	Progressive Auto Sales Arena	34	4,039	4,118	98.1%
Erie Otters	Erie Insurance Arena	34	3,987	6,716	59.3%
Niagara IceDogs	Meridian Centre	34	3,878	5,300	73.2%
Sault Ste. Marie Greyhounds	GFL Memorial Gardens	34	3,855	4,928	78.2%
Sudbury Wolves	Sudbury Community Arena	34	3,824	4,640	82.4%
Saginaw Spirit	Dow Event Center	34	3,688	5,527	66.7%
Barrie Colts	Sadlon Arena	34	3,673	4,195	87.6%
Peterborough Petes	Peterborough Memorial Centre	34	3,522	3,729	94.4%
Kingston Frontenacs	Slush Puppie Place	34	3,319	5,614	59.1%
Flint Firebirds	Dort Financial Center	34	3,124	4,365	71.6%
Brantford Bulldogs	Brantford Civic Centre	34	3,109	2,952	105.3%
North Bay Battalion	North Bay Memorial Gardens	34	2,870	4,262	67.3%
Owen Sound Attack	Bayshore Community Centre	34	2,722	3,500	77.8%
Mississauga Steelheads	Paramount Fine Foods Centre	34	2,431	5,612	43.3%

== Playoffs ==
Conference quarterfinals	Conference semifinals
1	Oshawa	4
8	Barrie	2
1	Oshawa	4
6	Ottawa	0
3	Brantford	2
6	Ottawa	4
Eastern Conference
2	North Bay	4
7	Kingston	1
2	North Bay	4
5	Sudbury	0
4	Mississauga	1
5	Sudbury	4
1	London	4
8	Flint	0
1	London	4
4	Kitchener	0
4	Kitchener	4
5	Erie	2
Western Conference
2	Saginaw	4
7	Owen Sound	0
2	Saginaw	4
3	S.S. Marie	3
3	S.S. Marie	4
6	Guelph	0

Conference finals
1	Oshawa	4
2	North Bay	3
1	London	4
2	Saginaw	2

Finals
E1	Oshawa	0
W1	London	4

=== Conference quarterfinals ===
==== Eastern conference quarterfinals ====
===== (1) Oshawa Generals vs. (8) Barrie Colts =====
March 29	Barrie Colts	4 – 2	Oshawa Generals	Tribute Communities Centre	Recap
No scoring		First period	No scoring
Shamar Moses (1) - 16:12; Cole Beaudoin (1) - 19:03		Second period	No scoring
Zach Wigle (1) - 0:46; Beau Jelsma (1) - en - 19:52		Third period	9:27 - pp - Beckett Sennecke (1); 17:59 - Dylan Roobroeck (1)
Sam Hillebrandt (1-0) (31 saves / 33 shots)		Goalie stats	Jacob Oster (0-1) (22 saves / 25 shots)

March 31	Barrie Colts	4 – 5	Oshawa Generals	Tribute Communities Centre	Recap
Riley Patterson (1) - pp - 1:25; Beau Jelsma (2) - 15:14		First period	11:59 - Beckett Sennecke (2); 14:51 - Dylan Roobroeck (2)
Bode Stewart (1) - 17:29		Second period	15:27 - pp - Matthew Buckey (1); 16:14 - pp - Matthew Buckley (2)
Luke Torrance (1) - 8:16		Third period	6:24 - Riley Patterson (2)
Sam Hillebrandt (1-1) (32 saves / 37 shots)		Goalie stats	Jacob Oster (1-1) (24 saves / 28 shots)

April 2	Oshawa Generals	5 – 1	Barrie Colts	Sadlon Arena	Recap
Matthew Buckley (3) - pp - 9:04; Rasmus Kumpulainen (1) - 14:12		First period	12:35 - Blair Scott (1)
Calum Ritchie (1) - pp - 0:33; Connor Punnett (1) - pp - 8:20		Second period	No scoring
Dylan Roobroeck (3) - en - 18:40		Third period	No scoring
Jacob Oster (2-1) (15 saves / 16 shots)		Goalie stats	Ben West (0-1) (42 saves / 46 shots)

April 4	Oshawa Generals	4 – 3	OT	Barrie Colts	Sadlon Arena	Recap
No scoring		First period		6:43 - Kyle Morey (1); 13:28 - Beau Jelsma (3)
Zackary Sandhu (1) - 6:05		Second period		18:08 - pp - Beau Jelsma (4)
Luca D'Amato (1) - 8:31; Connor Lockhart (1) - pp - 19:43		Third period		No scoring
Beckett Sennecke (3) - 17:11		First overtime period		No scoring
Jacob Oster (3-1) (34 saves / 37 shots)		Goalie stats		Sam Hillebrandt (1-2) (52 saves / 56 shots)

April 5	Barrie Colts	3 – 0	Oshawa Generals	Tribute Communities Centre	Recap
No scoring		First period	No scoring
No scoring		Second period	No scoring
Kashawn Aitcheson (1) - pp - 15:28; Zach Wigle (2) - en - 19:14; Cole Beaudoin (2) - en - 19:52		Third period	No scoring
Sam Hillebrandt (2-2) (47 saves / 47 shots)		Goalie stats	Jacob Oster (3-2) (23 saves / 24 shots)

April 7	Oshawa Generals	3 – 0	Barrie Colts	Sadlon Arena	Recap
Luca D'Amato (2) - 5:11		First period	No scoring
Luke Torrance (2) - 7:51		Second period	No scoring
Connor Punnett (2) - sh - en - 19:01		Third period	No scoring
Jacob Oster (4-2) (32 saves / 32 shots)		Goalie stats	Sam Hillebrandt (2-4) (34 saves / 36 shots)

Oshawa wins series 4 – 2

===== (2) North Bay Battalion vs. (7) Kingston Frontenacs =====
March 28	Kingston Frontenacs	2 – 4	North Bay Battalion	North Bay Memorial Gardens	Recap
No scoring		First period	10:18 - Anthony Romani (1)
Jacob Battaglia (1) - 0:21		Second period	5:47 - Ty Nelson (1); 15:19 - Dalyn Wakely (1)
Quinton Burns (1) - 0:40		Third period	18:53 - en - Justin Ertel (1)
Mason Vaccari (0-1) (23 saves / 26 shots)		Goalie stats	Dom DiVincentiis (1-0) (25 saves / 27 shots)

March 30	Kingston Frontenacs	3 – 7	North Bay Battalion	North Bay Memorial Gardens	Recap
Jacob Battaglia (2) - pp - 11:45		First period	2:25 - pp - Ty Nelson (2); 4:54 - Ihnat Pazii (1); 12:31 - sh - Dalyn Wakely (2); 14:01 - sh - Sandis Vilmanis (1); 19:40 - Dalyn Wakely (3)
Gage Hayes (1) - 12:28		Second period	3:04 - pp - Brice Cooke (1); 17:10 - pp - Owen Van Steensel (1)
Jacob Holmes (1) - 16:34		Third period	No scoring
Mason Vaccari (0-2) (6 saves / 11 shots); JJ Salajko (10 saves / 12 shots)		Goalie stats	Dom DiVincentiis (2 saves / 3 shots); Mike McIvor (1-0) (17 saves / 19 shots)

April 1	North Bay Battalion	1 – 4	Kingston Frontenacs	Slush Puppie Place	Recap
No scoring		First period	12:19 - Ethan Miedema (1); 17:47 - Roman Schmidt (1); 18:33 - pp - Matthew Soto (1)
Jacob Therrien (1) - 3:34		Second period	No scoring
No scoring		Third period	18:57 - en - Paul Ludwinski (1)
Mike McIvor (1-1) (23 saves / 26 shots)		Goalie stats	Mason Vaccari (1-2) (20 saves / 21 shots)

April 3	North Bay Battalion	5 – 4	Kingston Frontenacs	Slush Puppie Place	Recap
Dalyn Wakely (4) - 5:27; Dalyn Wakely (5) - 14:42; Lirim Amidovski (1) - 15:07		First period	No scoring
Dalyn Wakely (6) - 1:07; Brice Cooke (2) - pp - 15:59		Second period	11:26 - pp - Jacob Battaglia (3); 15:30 - sh - Nathan Poole (1)
No scoring		Third period	13:50 - pp - Paul Ludwinski (2); 18:03 - Jax Dubois (1)
Mike McIvor (2-1) (17 saves / 21 shots)		Goalie stats	Mason Vaccari (1-3) (26 saves / 31 shots)

April 5	Kingston Frontenacs	1 – 5	North Bay Battalion	North Bay Memorial Gardens	Recap
No scoring		First period	No scoring
No scoring		Second period	0:48 - pp - Justin Ertel (2); 11:00 - Justin Ertel (3); 18:10 - Paul Christopoulos (1)
Jacob Holmes (2) - 15:02		Third period	9:38 - pp - Ty Nelson (3); 10:24 - Owen Van Steensel (2)
Mason Vaccari (1-4) (18 saves / 23 shots)		Goalie stats	Mike McIvor (3-1) (22 saves / 23 shots)

North Bay wins series 4 – 1

===== (3) Brantford Bulldogs vs. (6) Ottawa 67's =====
March 29	Ottawa 67's	2 – 5	Brantford Bulldogs	Brantford Civic Centre	Recap
No scoring		First period	2:18 - pp - Nick Lardis (1); 14:35 - pp - Nick Lardis (2)
Luca Pinelli (1) - 6:56		Second period	9:59 - Marek Vanacker (1)
Caden Kelly (1) - 15:04		Third period	6:46 - Calvin Crombie (1); 10:15 - pp - Lawson Sherk (1)
Collin MacKenzie (0-1) (34 saves / 39 shots)		Goalie stats	Matteo Drobac (1-0) (26 saves / 28 shots)

March 31	Ottawa 67's	6 – 3	Brantford Bulldogs	Brantford Civic Centre	Recap
Cooper Foster (1) - 17:31; Frankie Marrelli (1) - 18:07		First period	1:01 - Florian Xhekaj (1)
Luca Pinelli (2) - sh - 6:29; Samuel Mayer (1) - pp - 16:53		Second period	3:27 - Calvin Crombie (2)
Cooper Foster (2) - en - 18:33; Braden Kressler (1) - en - 19:46		Third period	15:56 - Patrick Thomas (1)
Collin MacKenzie (1-1) (27 saves / 30 shots)		Goalie stats	Matteo Drobac (1-1) (26 saves / 30 shots)

April 2	Brantford Bulldogs	2 – 5	Ottawa 67's	TD Place Arena	Recap
Marek Vanacker (2) - 1:47		First period	12:58 - Luca Pinelli (3)
Jake O'Brien (1) - 5:12		Second period	0:30 - Braeden Kressler (2); 7:00 - Luca Pinelli (4); 12:02 - Caden Kelly (2)
No scoring		Third period	18:39 - en - Braden Kressler (3)
Matteo Drobac (1-2) (26 saves / 30 shots)		Goalie stats	Collin MacKenzie (2-1) (23 saves / 25 shots)

April 4	Brantford Bulldogs	5 – 6	OT	Ottawa 67's	TD Place Arena	Recap
Marek Vanacker (3) - 3:51		First period		No scoring
Adrian Rebelo (1) - 0:47; Zakary Lavoie (1) - pp - 14:46		Second period		4:57 - pp - Samuel Mayer (2); 19:20 - Samuel Mayer (3)
Zakary Lavoie (2) - pp - 17:08; Nick Lardis (3) - 19:04		Third period		6:20 - pp - Henry Mews (1); 7:29 - Bradley Horner (1); 14:36 - Will Gerrior (1)
No scoring		First overtime period		10:23 - Samuel Mayer (4)
Matteo Drobac (1-3) (23 saves / 29 shots)		Goalie stats		Collin MacKenzie (3-1) (37 saves / 42 shots)

April 6	Ottawa 67's	2 – 4	Brantford Bulldogs	Brantford Civic Centre	Recap
No scoring		First period	9:21 - pp - Nick Lardis (4); 19:26 - Zakary Lavoie (3)
Jack Dever (1) - 19:37		Second period	No scoring
Brady Stonehouse (1) - 12:03		Third period	10:38 - Florian Xhekaj (2); 19:09 - Florian Xhekaj (3)
Collin MacKenzie (3-2) (22 saves / 25 shots)		Goalie stats	Matteo Drobac (2-3) (26 saves / 28 shots)

April 7	Brantford Bulldogs	1 – 6	Ottawa 67's	TD Place Arena	Recap
No scoring		First period	4:47 - pp - Will Gerrior (2); 13:22 - Jack Dever (2)
No scoring		Second period	15:50 - Bradley Horner (2)
Zakary Lavoie (4) - pp - 1:04		Third period	6:26 - Will Gerrior (3); 15:23 - en - Bradley Horner (3); 19:19 - Chris Barlas (1)
Matteo Drobac (2-4) (32 saves / 37 shots)		Goalie stats	Collin MacKenzie (4-2) (31 saves / 32 shots)

Ottawa wins series 4 – 2

===== (4) Mississauga Steelheads vs. (5) Sudbury Wolves =====
March 28	Sudbury Wolves	3 – 0	Mississauga Steelheads	Paramount Fine Foods Centre	Recap
Landon McCallum (1) - 1:56; Dalibor Dvorský (1) - pp - 16:43		First period	No scoring
No scoring		Second period	No scoring
Dalibor Dvorský (2) - en - 18:08		Third period	No scoring
Jakub Vondras (1-0) (32 saves / 32 shots)		Goalie stats	Ryerson Leenders (0-1) (29 saves / 31 shots)

March 30	Sudbury Wolves	6 – 5	OT	Mississauga Steelheads	Paramount Fine Foods Centre	Recap
Kocha Delic (1) - pp - 7:04		First period		2:22 - Angus MacDonell (1); 9:21 - Marc Boudreau (1); 13:14 - pp - Chas Sharpe (1)
Evan Konyen (1) - 8:57; David Goyette (1) - 14:06		Second period		9:17 - Luke Misa (1)
Kocha Delic (2) - 10:42; Evan Konyen (2) - 18:53		Third period		17:22 - Lucas Karmiris (1)
Kocha Delic (3) - 2:33		First overtime period		No scoring
Jakub Vondras (2-0) (28 saves / 33 shots)		Goalie stats		Ryerson Leenders (14 saves / 15 shots); Jack Ivankovic (0-1) (24 saves / 29 shots)

April 1	Mississauga Steelheads	4 – 2	Sudbury Wolves	Sudbury Community Arena	Recap
Chas Sharpe (2) - pp - 3:36		First period	No scoring
Lucas Karmiris (2) - 4:59; Lucas Karmiris (3) - sh - 16:00		Second period	7:13 - pp - David Goyette (2); 13:19 - Landon McCallum (2)
Porter Martone (1) - en - 19:28		Third period	No scoring
Jack Ivankovic (1-1) (38 saves / 40 shots)		Goalie stats	Jakub Vondras (2-1) (21 saves / 24 shots)

April 3	Mississauga Steelheads	3 – 5	Sudbury Wolves	Sudbury Community Arena	Recap
Angus MacDonnell (2) - pp - 4:07		First period	18:24 - pp - Evan Konyen (3)
Finn Harding (1) - 1:13; Adam Zidlicky (1) - 15:00		Second period	8:40 - pp - David Goyette (3); 10:25 - pp - Landon McCallum (3); 13:15 - pp - Matthew Mania (1); 17:43 - Nick Yearwood (1)
No scoring		Third period	No scoring
Jack Ivankovic (1-2) (40 saves / 45 shots)		Goalie stats	Jakub Vondras (3-1) (25 saves / 28 shots)

April 5	Sudbury Wolves	6 – 2	Mississauga Steelheads	Paramount Fine Foods Centre	Recap
Alex Pharand (1) - 2:22; Evan Konyen (4) - pp - 10:03		First period	15:39 - pp - Angus MacDonnell (3)
Nick DeAngelis (1) - pp - 14:49		Second period	2:15 - Jack Van Volsen (1)
Quentin Musty (1) - pp - 1:56; Nick DeAngelis (2) - pp - 13:29; David Goyette (4) - en - 18:44		Third period	No scoring
Marcus Vandenberg (1-0) (26 saves / 28 shots)		Goalie stats	Jack Ivankovic (1-3) (26 saves / 31 shots)

Sudbury wins series 4 – 1

==== Western conference quarterfinals ====
===== (1) London Knights vs. (8) Flint Firebirds =====
March 29	Flint Firebirds	0 – 3	London Knights	Budweiser Gardens	Recap
No scoring		First period	3:29 - Kaleb Lawrence (1)
No scoring		Second period	7:47 - Kaleb Lawrence (2)
No scoring		Third period	19:10 - en - Easton Cowan (1)
Nathaniel Day (0-1) (17 saves / 19 shots)		Goalie stats	Michael Simpson (1-0) (23 saves / 23 shots)

March 31	Flint Firebirds	4 – 6	London Knights	Budweiser Gardens	Recap
Coulson Pitre (1) - pp - 9:40; Oliver Peer (1) - pp - 11:03; Oliver Peer (2) - 12:10		First period	2:42 - Kasper Halttunen (1); 12:39 - Isaiah George (1)
No scoring		Second period	3:37 - pp - Kasper Halttunen (2); 13:58 - pp - Max McCue (1)
Nathan Aspinall (1) - pp - 10:07		Third period	17:42 - pp - Oliver Bonk (1); 19:47 - en - Denver Barkey (1)
Nathaniel Day (0-2) (33 saves / 38 shots)		Goalie stats	Michael Simpson (2-0) (18 saves / 22 shots)

April 2	London Knights	4 – 3	OT	Flint Firebirds	Dort Financial Center	Recap
Kaleb Lawrence (3) - 12:15; Easton Cowan (2) - 13:06		First period		11:50 - Connor Clattenburg (1)
No scoring		Second period		No scoring
Kasper Halttunen (3) - 2:19		Third period		4:47 - Coulson Pitre (2); 7:07 - Blake Smith (1)
Oliver Bonk (2) - 11:59		First overtime period		No scoring
Michael Simpson (3-0) (25 saves / 28 shots)		Goalie stats		Nathaniel Day (0-3) (32 saves / 36 shots)

April 4	London Knights	3 – 2	Flint Firebirds	Dort Financial Center	Recap
Landon Sim (2) - 8:54		First period	No scoring
No scoring		Second period	13:35 - Simon Slavicek (1)
Sam O'Reilly (1) - 4:46; Denver Barkey (2) - en - 18:43		Third period	18:52 - Matthew Wang (1)
Michael Simpson (4-0) (34 saves / 36 shots)		Goalie stats	Nathaniel Day (0-4) (28 saves / 30 shots)

London wins series 4 – 0

===== (2) Saginaw Spirit vs. (7) Owen Sound Attack =====
March 28	Owen Sound Attack	4 – 6	Saginaw Spirit	Dow Event Center	Recap
Cedrick Guindon (1) - 4:08		First period	0:52 - Josh Bloom (1); 16:16 - Josh Bloom (2)
Declan Waddick (1) - 0:45; Deni Goure (1) - 6:38		Second period	7:12 - Rodwin Dionicio (1); 18:32 - Michael Misa (1)
Konnor Smith (1) - 19:56		Third period	17:28 - Hunter Haight (1); 18:01 - Hunter Haight (2)
Carter George (0-1) (40 saves / 45 shots)		Goalie stats	Andrew Oke (1-0) (24 saves / 28 shots)

March 30	Owen Sound Attack	2 – 5	Saginaw Spirit	Dow Event Center	Recap
No scoring		First period	12:05 - pp - Joey Willis (1); 17:07 - sh - Josh Bloom (3)
James Petrovski (1) - 5:52		Second period	4:00 - pp - Owen Beck (1); 8:26 - James Guo (1)
Ethan Burroughs (1) - 17:22		Third period	19:17 - en - Michael Misa (2)
Carter George (0-2) (32 saves / 36 shots)		Goalie stats	Andrew Oke (2-0) (35 saves / 37 shots)

April 1	Saginaw Spirit	2 – 1	Owen Sound Attack	Bayshore Community Centre	Recap
Nic Sima (1) - 19:46		First period	No scoring
Joey Willis (1) - 19:49		Second period	17:18 - pp - Colby Barlow (1)
No scoring		Third period	No scoring
Andrew Oke (3-0) (24 saves / 25 shots)		Goalie stats	Carter George (0-3) (40 saves / 42 shots)

April 3	Saginaw Spirit	5 – 1	Owen Sound Attack	Bayshore Community Centre	Recap
Zayne Parekh (1) - 3:56; Michael Misa (3) - 19:21		First period	11:39 - sh - Servac Petrovsky (1)
Nic Sima (2) - 11:54; Rodwin Dionicio (2) - 17:29		Second period	No scoring
Owen Beck (2) - pp - 6:05		Third period	No scoring
Andrew Oke (4-0) (20 saves / 21 shots)		Goalie stats	Carter George (0-4) (39 saves / 44 shots)

Saginaw wins series 4 – 0

===== (3) Sault Ste. Marie Greyhounds vs. (6) Guelph Storm =====
March 28	Guelph Storm	3 – 4	Sault Ste. Marie Greyhounds	GFL Memorial Gardens	Recap
Jake Karabela (1) - pp - 14:09		First period	No scoring
Michael Buchinger (1) - pp - 8:31; Brody Crane (1) - 12:14		Second period	7:31 - Arttu Karki (1); 9:46 - Bryce McConnell-Barker (1); 10:11 - Owen Allard (1); 14:49 - pp - Gavin Hayes (1)
No scoring		Third period	No scoring
Damian Slavik (0-1) (18 saves / 22 shots)		Goalie stats	Charlie Schenkel (1-0) (14 saves / 17 shots)

March 30	Guelph Storm	1 – 4	Sault Ste. Marie Greyhounds	GFL Memorial Gardens	Recap
No scoring		First period	1:02 - Caeden Carlisle (1)
Rylan Singh (1) - pp - 16:42		Second period	5:39 - pp - Marco Mignosa (1); 6:24 - pp - Jacob Frasca (1); 16:33 - sh - Arttu Karki (2)
No scoring		Third period	No scoring
Damian Slavik (0-2) (23 saves / 27 shots)		Goalie stats	Charlie Schenkel (2-0) (19 saves / 20 shots)

April 1	Sault Ste. Marie Greyhounds	5 – 4	OT	Guelph Storm	Sleeman Centre	Recap
No scoring		First period		No scoring
Jacob Frasca (2) - 5:28; Bryce McConnell-Barker (2) - pp - 17:35; Gavin Hayes (2) - 18:03		Second period		1:20 - Vilmer Alriksson (1); 3:52 - Parker Snelgrove (1); 8:38 - pp - Charlie Paquette (1); 10:52 - Brody Crane (1)
Kirill Kudryavtsev (1) - 14:55		Third period		No scoring
Owen Allard (2) - pp - 0:57		First overtime period		No scoring
Charlie Schenkel (9 saves / 13 shots); Landon Miller (1-0) (8 saves / 8 shots)		Goalie stats		Brayden Gillespie (0-1) (33 saves / 38 shots)

April 3	Sault Ste. Marie Greyhounds	5 – 1	Guelph Storm	Sleeman Centre	Recap
Brady Martin (1) - 14:49		First period	No scoring
Gavin Hayes (3) - 8:56; Jordan D'Intino (1) - 16:18		Second period	0:23 - pp - Michael Buchinger (2)
Jordan D'Intino (2) - 8:30; Owen Allard (3) - en - 16:32		Third period	No scoring
Charlie Schenkel (3-0) (26 saves / 27 shots)		Goalie stats	Brayden Gillespie (0-2) (17 saves / 21 shots)

Sault Ste. Marie wins series 4 – 0

===== (4) Kitchener Rangers vs. (5) Erie Otters =====
March 29	Erie Otters	3 – 6	Kitchener Rangers	Kitchener Memorial Auditorium	Recap
Dylan Edwards (1) - 13:54		First period	6:46 - Luke Ellinas (1); 10:16 - pp - Matthew Sop (1)
No scoring		Second period	16:07 - Luke Ellinas (2)
Dylan Edwards (2) - 0:35; Sam Alfano (1) - 8:34		Third period	4:09 - Eduard Šalé (1); 13:14 - Max Dirracolo (1); 19:35 - en - pp - Carson Rehkopf (1)
Ethan Fraser (0-1) (27 saves / 32 shots)		Goalie stats	Jackson Parsons (1-0) (26 saves / 29 shots)

March 31	Erie Otters	7 – 4	Kitchener Rangers	Kitchener Memorial Auditorium	Recap
Pano Fimis (1) - 5:14		First period	1:44 - pp - Carson Rehkopf (2); 2:27 - Matheas Stark (1)
Malcolm Spence (1) - 2:11; Sam Alfano (2) - 6:22		Second period	18:10 - Carson Rehkopf (3)
Casey Terrance (1) - 1:26; Sam Alfano (3) - 10:37; Kaleb Smith (1) - 16:24; Dylan Edwards (3) - en - 18:05		Third period	4:17 - pp - Matthew Sop (2)
Ethan Fraser (1-1) (24 saves / 28 shots)		Goalie stats	Jackson Parsons (1-1) (18 saves / 24 shots)

April 2	Kitchener Rangers	4 – 3	OT	Erie Otters	Erie Insurance Arena	Recap
No scoring		First period		3:57 - pp - Sam Alfano (4); 15:31 - Kaleb Smith (2)
Adrian Misaljevic (1) - 2:45; Antonio Pugliese (1) - 14:59		Second period		1:12 - Dylan Edwards (4)
Justin Bottineau (1) - 8:56		Third period		No scoring
Justin Bottineau (2) - 7:57		First overtime period		No scoring
Jackson Parsons (2-1) (40 saves / 43 shots)		Goalie stats		Ben Gaudreau (0-1) (23 saves / 27 shots)

April 4	Kitchener Rangers	3 – 5	Erie Otters	Erie Insurance Arena	Recap
Carson Rehkopf (4) - pp - 11:15; Filip Mešár (1) - 12:24		First period	5:52 - Sam Alfano (5)
Luke Ellinas (3) - pp - 12:58		Second period	11:54 - sh - Pano Fimis (2)
No scoring		Third period	6:58 - Brett Bressette (1); 8:19 - Alexis Daviault (1); 19:34 - en - Martin Misiak (1)
Jackson Parsons (2-2) (35 saves / 39 shots)		Goalie stats	Ben Gaudreau (1-1) (30 saves / 33 shots)

April 5	Erie Otters	2 – 3	OT	Kitchener Rangers	Kitchener Memorial Auditorium	Recap
No scoring		First period		No scoring
Pano Fimis (3) - 3:52		Second period		3:30 - Tanner Lam (1)
Dylan Edwards (5) - 9:56		Third period		7:12 - Matthew Sop (3)
No scoring		First overtime period		12:02 - Trent Swick (1)
Ben Gaudreau (1-2) (47 saves / 50 shots)		Goalie stats		Jackson Parsons (3-2) (31 saves / 33 shots)

April 9	Kitchener Rangers	4 – 3	OT	Erie Otters	Erie Insurance Arena	Recap
Eduard Šalé (2) - pp - 2:51; Eduard Šalé (3) - 16:02		First period		15:31 - Dylan Edwards (6)
Trent Swick (2) - 6:27		Second period		13:28 - Carey Terrance (2)
No scoring		Third period		17:06 - pp - Pano Fimis (4)
Luke Ellinas (4) - 5:38		First overtime period		No scoring
Jackson Parsons (4-2) (29 saves / 32 shots)		Goalie stats		Ben Gaudreau (1-3) (25 saves / 29 shots)

Kitchener wins series 4 – 2

=== Conference semifinals ===
==== Eastern conference semifinals ====
===== (1) Oshawa Generals vs. (6) Ottawa 67's =====
April 12	Ottawa 67's	3 – 4	Oshawa Generals	Tribute Communities Centre	Recap
Thomas Sirman (1) - pp - 16:26		First period	No scoring
No scoring		Second period	6:50 - Dylan Roobroeck (4)
Luca Pinelli (5) - 6:34; Braeden Kressler (4) - 14:53		Third period	2:52 - Beckett Sennecke (4); 10:39 - Calum Ritchie (2); 11:57 - Calum Ritchie (3)
Collin MacKenzie (4-3) (33 saves / 37 shots)		Goalie stats	Jacob Oster (5-2) (27 saves / 30 shots)

April 14	Ottawa 67's	1 – 6	Oshawa Generals	Tribute Communities Centre	Recap
Chris Barlas (2) - 8:38		First period	9:12 - Stuart Rolofs (1); 18:58 - Ben Danford (1)
No scoring		Second period	15:13 - Matthew Buckley (4); 16:36 - Beckett Sennecke (5)
No scoring		Third period	2:30 - Dylan Roobroeck (5); 3:34 - pp - Beckett Sennecke (6)
Collin MacKenzie (4-4) (35 saves / 41 shots)		Goalie stats	Jacob Oster (6-2) (30 saves / 31 shots)

April 16	Oshawa Generals	4 – 3	OT	Ottawa 67's	TD Place Arena	Recap
Dylan Roobroeck (6) - pp - 15:25		First period		10:00 - pp - Braden Kressler (5)
No scoring		Second period		13:40 - Henry Mews (2)
Ben Danford (2) - 10:40; Connor Punnett (3) - 13:25		Third period		17:50 - Braeden Kressler (6)
Connor Lockhart (2) - 17:07		First overtime period		No scoring
Jacob Oster (7-2) (39 saves / 42 shots)		Goalie stats		Collin MacKenzie (4-5) (38 saves / 42 shots)

April 18	Oshawa Generals	4 – 1	Ottawa 67's	TD Place Arena	Recap
Calum Ritchie (4) - pp - 8:29		First period	13:01 - pp - Thomas Sirman (2)
Owen Griffin (1) - 5:34; Dylan Roobroeck (7) - 12:30; Luke Torrance (3) - 19:12		Second period	No scoring
No scoring		Third period	No scoring
Jacob Oster (8-2) (31 saves / 32 shots)		Goalie stats	Collin MacKenzie (4-6) (20 saves / 24 shots)

Oshawa wins series 4 – 0

===== (2) North Bay Battalion vs. (5) Sudbury Wolves =====
April 11	Sudbury Wolves	2 – 5	North Bay Battalion	North Bay Memorial Gardens	Recap
No scoring		First period	6:33 - Andrew LeBlanc (1)
David Goyette (5) - 1:14; Quentin Musty (2) - 9:48		Second period	1:51 - Justin Ertel (4); 16:05 - Andrew LeBlanc (2)
No scoring		Third period	6:49 - Ethan Procyszyn (1); 19:09 - en - Dalyn Wakely (7)
Marcus Vandenberg (1-1) (22 saves / 26 shots)		Goalie stats	Mike McIvor (4-1) (27 saves / 29 shots)

April 13	Sudbury Wolves	1 – 5	North Bay Battalion	North Bay Memorial Gardens	Recap
No scoring		First period	0:24 - Sandis Vilmanis (2); 14:14 - Jacob Therrien (2)
No scoring		Second period	No scoring
Kocha Delic (4) - pp - 15:57		Third period	4:53 - Justin Ertel (5); 6:12 - Ihnat Pazii (2); 13:51 - en - sh - Owen Van Steensel (3)
Marcus Vandenberg (1-2) (25 saves / 29 shots)		Goalie stats	Mike McIvor (5-1) (35 saves / 36 shots)

April 16	North Bay Battalion	6 – 5	OT	Sudbury Wolves	Sudbury Community Arena	Recap
Ihnat Pazii (3) - 1:53; Dalyn Wakely (8) - 4:04		First period		5:07 - Nathan Villeneuve (1); 5:54 - Dalibor Dvorský (3); 17:10 - Nathan Villeneuve (2)
No scoring		Second period		14:43 - Chase Coughlan (1); 19:00 - pp - Zacharie Giroux (1)
Justin Ertel (6) - sh - 5:56; Owen Van Steensel (4) - pp - 16:40; Ethan Procyszyn (2) - pp - 17:08		Third period		No scoring
Dalyn Wakely (9) - 12:19		First overtime period		No scoring
Mike McIvor (6-1) (41 saves / 46 shots)		Goalie stats		Jakub Vondras (3-2) (28 saves / 34 shots)

April 18	North Bay Battalion	5 – 0	Sudbury Wolves	Sudbury Community Arena	Recap
Sandis Vilmanis (3) - 0:28; Dalyn Wakely (10) - pp - 2:23; Sandis Vilmanis (4) - 17:52		First period	No scoring
No scoring		Second period	No scoring
Dalyn Wakely (11) - en - 15:23; Sandis Vilmanis (5) - 17:10		Third period	No scoring
Mike McIvor (7-1) (36 saves / 36 shots)		Goalie stats	Jakub Vondras (3-3) (3 saves / 6 shots); Marcus Vandenberg (14 saves / 15 shots)

North Bay wins series 4 – 0

==== Western conference semifinals ====
===== (1) London Knights vs. (4) Kitchener Rangers =====
April 11	Kitchener Rangers	3 – 5	London Knights	Budweiser Gardens	Recap
Luke Ellinas (5) - 14:41		First period	17:10 - Kaleb Lawrence (4)
Eduard Šalé (4) - 16:08		Second period	18:19 - Isaiah George (2)
Hunter Brzustewicz (1) - 1:58		Third period	1:29 - Denver Barkey (3); 3:29 - pp - Oliver Bonk (2); 19:25 - en - Max McCue (2)
Jackson Parsons (4-3) (26 saves / 30 shots)		Goalie stats	Michael Simpson (5-0) (22 saves / 25 shots)

April 13	Kitchener Rangers	1 – 5	London Knights	Budweiser Gardens	Recap
Carson Rehkopf (5) - 6:57		First period	0:40 - Kaleb Lawrence (5); 11:31 - Kasper Halttunen (4)
No scoring		Second period	2:36 - Henry Brzustewicz (1); 6:16 - pp - Jacob Julien (1)
No scoring		Third period	7:43 - Jackson Edward (1)
Jackson Parsons (4-4) (20 saves / 25 shots)		Goalie stats	Michael Simpson (6-0) (23 saves / 24 shots)

April 16	London Knights	6 – 4	Kitchener Rangers	Kitchener Memorial Auditorium	Recap
Sam Dickinson (1) - 0:15; Kasper Halttunen (5) - 3:50		First period	No scoring
Jacob Julien (2) - pp - 1:04; Jacob Julien (3) - pp - 7:20		Second period	5:11 - pp - Adrian Misaljevic (2); 13:33 - pp - Trent Swick (3); 15:52 - pp - Eduard Šalé (5)
Jacob Julien (4) - 9:26; Isaiah George (3) - en - 19:44		Third period	3:13 - Cameron Mercer (1)
Michael Simpson (7-0) (25 saves / 29 shots)		Goalie stats	Jackson Parsons (4-5) (28 saves / 33 shots)

April 18	London Knights	4 – 3	Kitchener Rangers	Kitchener Memorial Auditorium	Recap
Jacob Julien (5) - 0:39		First period	11:15 - Carson Rehkopf (6)
Jacob Julien (6) - pp - 13:54; Jacob Julien (7) - 16:52; Kasper Halttunen (6) - 17:46		Second period	19:42 - Trent Swick (4)
No scoring		Third period	17:13 - Trent Swick (5)
Michael Simpson (8-0) (26 saves / 29 shots)		Goalie stats	Jackson Parsons (4-6) (25 saves / 29 shots)

London wins series 4 – 0

===== (2) Saginaw Spirit vs. (3) Sault Ste. Marie Greyhounds =====
April 11	Sault Ste. Marie Greyhounds	0 – 4	Saginaw Spirit	Dow Event Center	Recap
No scoring		First period	No scoring
No scoring		Second period	4:40 - Hunter Haight (3); 14:05 - Calem Mangone (1)
No scoring		Third period	0:55 - Alex Christopoulos (1); 15:25 - en - Matyas Sapovaliv (1)
Charlie Schenkel (3-1) (31 saves / 34 shots)		Goalie stats	Andrew Oke (5-0) (39 saves / 39 shots)

April 13	Sault Ste. Marie Greyhounds	5 – 2	Saginaw Spirit	Dow Event Center	Recap
Julian Fantino (1) - 4:45; Jordan D'Intino (3) - 18:12		First period	16:23 - pp - Zayne Parekh (2)
Owen Allard (4) - pp - 15:15		Second period	No scoring
Jordan D'Intino (4) - 10:03; Jordan D'Intino (5) - 16:38		Third period	6:58 - Nic Sima (3)
Charlie Schenkel (4-1) (25 saves / 27 shots)		Goalie stats	Andrew Oke (9 saves / 11 shots); Nolan Lalonde (0-1) (7 saves / 10 shots)

April 15	Saginaw Spirit	7 – 2	Sault Ste. Marie Greyhounds	GFL Memorial Gardens	Recap
Jorian Donovan (1) - 13:47		First period	No scoring
Alex Christopoulos (2) - 0:13; Calem Mangone (2) - 9:49		Second period	7:34 - Gavin Hayes (4); 9:24 - Jordan D'Intino (6)
Rodwin Dionicio (3) - 4:21; Calem Mangone (3) - 14:26; Braden Haché (1) - en - 16:57; Sebastian Gervais (1) - pp - 18:46		Third period	No scoring
Nolan Lalonde (1-1) (21 saves / 23 shots)		Goalie stats	Charlie Schenkel (4-2) (18 saves / 24 shots)

April 17	Saginaw Spirit	0 – 4	Sault Ste. Marie Greyhounds	GFL Memorial Gardens	Recap
No scoring		First period	15:17 - pp - Bryce McConnell-Barker (3)
No scoring		Second period	11:19 - Bryce McConnell-Barker (4)
No scoring		Third period	2:59 - pp - Jordan D'Intino (7); 17:13 - en - Marco Mignosa (2)
Nolan Lalonde (1-2) (24 saves / 27 shots)		Goalie stats	Charlie Schenkel (5-2) (27 saves/ 27 shots)

April 19	Sault Ste. Marie Greyhounds	2 – 3	OT	Saginaw Spirit	Dow Event Center	Recap
Bryce McConnell-Barker (5) - pp - 11:47		First period		No scoring
Jack Beck (1) - 17:49		Second period		2:00 - Matyas Sapovaliv (2)
No scoring		Third period		7:54 - pp - Hunter Haight (4)
No scoring		First overtime period		7:53 - Calem Mangone (4)
Charlie Schenkel (5-3) (37 saves / 40 shots)		Goalie stats		Nolan Lalonde (2-2) (32 saves / 34 shots)

April 21	Saginaw Spirit	0 – 5	Sault Ste. Marie Greyhounds	GFL Memorial Gardens	Recap
No scoring		First period	19:54 - Jacob Frasca (3)
No scoring		Second period	4:02 - Jack Beck (2); 6:02 - pp - Gavin Hayes (5); 16:04 - pp - Gavin Hayes (6); 19:41 - Marco Mignosa (3)
No scoring		Third period	No scoring
Nolan Lalonde (2-3) (29 saves / 34 shots)		Goalie stats	Charlie Schenkel (6-3) (24 saves / 24 shots)

April 23	Sault Ste. Marie Greyhounds	1 – 3	Saginaw Spirit	Dow Event Center	Recap
No scoring		First period	10:17 - Joey Willis (3)
Gavin Hayes (7) - 15:10		Second period	No scoring
No scoring		Third period	9:24 - Calem Mangone (5); 19:00 - en - Matyas Sapovaliv (3)
Charlie Schenkel (6-4) (31 saves / 33 shots)		Goalie stats	Nolan Lalonde (3-3) (16 saves / 17 shots)

Saginaw wins series 4 – 3

=== Conference finals ===
==== Eastern conference finals ====
===== (1) Oshawa Generals vs. (2) North Bay Battalion =====
April 26	North Bay Battalion	2 – 4	Oshawa Generals	Tribute Communities Centre	Recap
Sandis Vilmanis (6) - 3:04; Dalyn Wakely (12) - 4:30		First period	16:58 - pp - Stuart Rolofs (2)
No scoring		Second period	6:05 - Stuart Rolofs (3)
No scoring		Third period	1:54 - Luca Marrelli (1); 19:18 - Connor Lockhart (3)
Mike McIvor (7-2) (29 saves / 32 shots)		Goalie stats	Jacob Oster (9-2) (24 saves / 26 shots)

April 28	North Bay Battalion	0 – 3	Oshawa Generals	Tribute Communities Centre	Recap
No scoring		First period	18:29 - Rasmus Kumpulainen (2)
No scoring		Second period	17:25 - pp - Stuart Rolofs (4)
No scoring		Third period	19:49 - en - Beckett Sennecke (7)
Mike McIvor (7-3) (35 saves / 37 shots)		Goalie stats	Jacob Oster (10-2) (22 saves / 22 shots)

April 29	Oshawa Generals	5 – 2	North Bay Battalion	North Bay Memorial Gardens	Recap
Calum Ritchie (5) - 18:36		First period	2:33 - pp - Owen Van Steensel (5)
Stuart Rolofs (5) - 3:01; Connor Lockhart (4) - pp - 7:49; Beckett Sennecke (8) - 9:39		Second period	No scoring
Calum Ritchie (6) - 3:49		Third period	2:12 - Sandis Vilmanis (7)
Jacob Oster (11-2) (39 saves / 41 shots)		Goalie stats	Mike McIvor (7-4) (26 saves / 31 shots)

May 1	Oshawa Generals	4 – 5	OT	North Bay Battalion	North Bay Memorial Gardens	Recap
Connor Lockhart (5) - 17:00		First period		0:38 - Liam Arnsby (1); 7:35 - Sandis Vilmanis (8)
Beckett Sennecke (9) - 3:50; Dylan Roobroeck (8) - sh - 6:35		Second period		No scoring
Beckett Sennecke (10) - 10:51		Third period		9:55 - Tnais Mathurin (1); 18:51 - Paul Christopoulos (2)
No scoring		First overtime period		6:02 - Sandis Vilmarnis (9)
Jacob Oster (11-3) (38 saves / 43 shots)		Goalie stats		Mike McIvor (8-4) (27 saves / 31 shots)

May 3	North Bay Battalion	5 – 4	2OT	Oshawa Generals	Tribute Communities Centre	Recap
No scoring		First period		No scoring
Anthony Romani (2) - 13:15; Anthony Romani (3) - 18:53		Second period		2:44 - Lucas Rodriguez (1)
Justin Ertel (7) - 7:26; Ty Nelson (4) - 11:19		Third period		3:35 - pp - Luca Marrelli (2); 6:02 - Luca D'Amato (3); 11:00 - Luke Torrance (4)
Ty Nelson (5) - 4:53		Second overtime period		No scoring
Mike McIvor (9-4) (41 saves / 45 shots)		Goalie stats		Jacob Oster (11-4) (42 saves / 47 shots)

May 5	Oshawa Generals	1 – 8	North Bay Battalion	North Bay Memorial Gardens	Recap
No scoring		First period	0:43 - Dalyn Wakely (13); 12:00 - pp - Sandis Vilmanis (10); 13:30 - Brice Cooke (3); 18:22 - Owen Van Steensel (6)
Ben Danford (3) - 19:18		Second period	7:50 - Liam Arnsby (2); 16:40 - pp - Owen Van Steensel (7)
No scoring		Third period	11:19 - Justin Ertel (8); 16:12 - Jacob Therrien (3)
Jacob Oster (11-5) (12 saves / 17 shots); Noah Bender (14 saves / 17 shots)		Goalie stats	Mike McIvor (10-4) (35 saves / 36 shots)

May 6	North Bay Battalion	1 – 6	Oshawa Generals	Tribute Communities Centre	Recap
No scoring		First period	14:07 - David Bedkowski (1)
No scoring		Second period	10:53 - Rasmus Kumpulainen (3); 14:42 - Connor Lockhart (6)
Jacob LeBlanc (1) - 5:51		Third period	2:08 - Dylan Roobroeck (9); 16:51 - en - Dylan Roobroeck (10); 19:39 - en - Ethan Toms (1)
Mike McIvor (10-5) (27 saves / 31 shots)		Goalie stats	Jacob Oster (12-5) (24 saves / 25 shots)

Oshawa wins series 4 – 3

==== Western conference finals ====
===== (1) London Knights vs. (2) Saginaw Spirit =====
April 26	Saginaw Spirit	1 – 3	London Knights	Budweiser Gardens	Recap
Rodwin Dionicio (4) - 16:01		First period	No scoring
No scoring		Second period	No scoring
No scoring		Third period	11:45 - pp - Kasper Halttunen (7); 13:39 - Kasper Halttunen (8); 19:40 - en - Easton Cowan (3)
Nolan Lalonde (3-4) (27 saves / 29 shots)		Goalie stats	Michael Simpson (9-0) (30 saves / 31 shots)

April 28	Saginaw Spirit	1 – 3	London Knights	Budweiser Gardens	Recap
No scoring		First period	5:01 - Ruslan Gazizov (1); 13:50 - pp - Kasper Halttunen (9)
Rodwin Dionicio (5) - pp - 0:32		Second period	No scoring
No scoring		Third period	18:54 - en - Ruslan Gazizov (2)
Nolan Lalonde (3-5) (26 saves / 28 shots)		Goalie stats	Michael Simpson (10-0) (17 saves / 18 shots)

April 29	London Knights	2 – 6	Saginaw Spirit	Dow Event Center	Recap
Ruslan Gazizov (3) - 7:55; Landon Sim (3) - 15:16		First period	2:55 - pp - Hunter Haight (5)
No scoring		Second period	4:59 - Owen Beck (3); 10:54 - Michael Misa (4); 18:33 - Hunter Haight (6)
No scoring		Third period	3:35 - Calem Mangone (6); 14:19 - Alex Christopoulos (3)
Michael Simpson (10-1) (26 saves / 31 shots); Owen Willmore (6 saves / 7 shots)		Goalie stats	Nolan Lalonde (4-5) (18 saves / 20 shots)

May 1	London Knights	7 – 3	Saginaw Spirit	Dow Event Center	Recap
Sam Dickinson (2) - 0:28; Sam O'Reilly (2) - 2:29		First period	5:13 - pp - Calem Mangone (7)
Landom Sim (4) - 4:04; Oliver Bonk (3) - pp - 10:17		Second period	5:44 - Jorian Donovan (2); 13:26 - Owen Beck (4)
Easton Cowan (4) - 15:55; Sam O'Reilly (3) - en - 17:09; Isaiah George (4) - en - 18:43		Third period	No scoring
Michael Simpson (11-1) (34 saves / 37 shots)		Goalie stats	Nolan Lalonde (4-6) (21 saves / 26 shots)

May 3	Saginaw Spirit	4 – 2	London Knights	Budweiser Gardens	Recap
Hunter Haight (7) - 14:56		First period	No scoring
Josh Bloom (4) - pp - 1:54; Hunter Haight (8) - 17:29		Second period	14:15 - Oliver Bonk (4); 17:55 - Easton Cowan (5)
Hunter Haight (9) - pp - 5:44		Third period	No scoring
Nolan Lalonde (5-6) (26 saves / 28 shots)		Goalie stats	Michael Simpson (11-2) (31 saves / 35 shots)

May 5	London Knights	4 – 2	Saginaw Spirit	Dow Event Center	Recap
Easton Cowan (6) - 19:10		First period	No scoring
No scoring		Second period	16:43 - Joey Willis (4)
Sam O'Reilly (4) - 1:25; Jackson Edward (2); Easton Cowan (7) - en - 19:22		Third period	7:35 - Jorian Donovan (3)
Michael Simpson (12-2) (33 saves / 35 shots)		Goalie stats	Nolan Lalonde (5-7) (22 saves / 25 shots)

London wins series 4 – 2

=== J. Ross Robertson Cup finals ===
==== (W1) London Knights vs. (E1) Oshawa Generals ====
May 9	Oshawa Generals	1 – 8	London Knights	Budweiser Gardens	Recap
No scoring		First period	8:50 - pp - Oliver Bonk (5); 16:58 - Jared Woolley (1)
Connor Lockhart (7) - 19:42		Second period	0:28 - Oliver Bonk (6); 10:23 - Easton Cowan (8); 18:10 - pp - Denver Barkey (4)
No scoring		Third period	0:11 - Jacob Julien (8); 1:20 - Ruslan Gazizov (4); 5:48 - Ruslan Gazizov (5)
Jacob Oster (12-6) (25 saves / 32 shots); Noah Bender (8 saves / 9 shots)		Goalie stats	Michael Simpson (13-2) (24 saves / 25 shots)

May 11	Oshawa Generals	1 – 9	London Knights	Budweiser Gardens	Recap
No scoring		First period	9:27 - Ruslan Gazizov (6); 11:48 - pp - Kasper Halttunen (10); 17:09 - pp - Easton Cowan (9); 17:29 - Evan Van Gorp (1)
Ben Danford (4) - 18:36		Second period	3:26 - Kasper Halttunen (11); 5:32 - Denver Barkey (5); 14:52 - pp - Kasper Halttunen (12); 16:48 - Max McCue (3)
No scoring		Third period	3:20 - pp - Jacob Julien (9)
Jacob Oster (12-7) (25 saves / 33 shots); Noah Bender (5 saves / 6 shots)		Goalie stats	Michael Simpson (14-2) (16 saves / 17 shots); Owen Willmore (5 shots / 5 saves)

May 13	London Knights	7 – 6	2OT	Oshawa Generals	Tribute Communities Centre	Recap
Sam Dickinson (3) - 17:07		First period		12:12 - Calum Ritchie (7); 12:36 - Luca D'Amato (4); 13:19 - Connor Lockhart (8)
Kasper Halttunen (13) - pp - 13:35		Second period		10:47 - pp - Dylan Roobroeck (11); 13:58 - Connor Lockhart (9); 14:33 - Luca D'Amato (5)
Oliver Bonk (7) - pp - 1:04; Kasper Halttunen (14) - pp - 11:09; Kasper Halttunen (15) - 13:00; Sam O'Reilly (5) - 17:03		Third period		No scoring
Henry Brzustewicz (2) - 2:00		Second overtime period		No scoring
Michael Simpson (13 saves / 19 shots); Owen Willmore (1-0) (17 saves / 17 shots)		Goalie stats		Jacob Oster (12-8) (37 saves / 44 shots)

May 15	London Knights	7 – 1	Oshawa Generals	Tribute Communities Centre	Recap
Sam Dickinson (4) - 3:00; Ruslan Gazizov (7) - 7:31; Kasper Halttunen (16) - pp - 12:31		First period	19:13 - Calum Ritchie (8)
Denver Barkey (6) - 7:01; Kasper Halttunen (17) - 12:13; Easton Cowan (10) - pp - 16:30		Second period	No scoring
William Nicholl (1) - pp - 16:08		Third period	No scoring
Michael Simpson (15-2) (25 saves / 26 shots)		Goalie stats	Jacob Oster (12-9) (23 saves / 30 shots)

London wins series 4 – 0

=== J. Ross Robertson Cup Champions Roster ===
2023-24 London Knights
Goaltenders: (Canada) 31 – Michael Simpson; (Canada) 80 – Owen Willmore	Defencemen: (United States) 2 – Henry Brzustewicz; (Canada) 3 – Sam Dickinson; (Canada) 4 – Isaiah George; (Canada) 17 – Ethan MacKinnon; (Canada) 24 – Noah Jenken; (Canada) 27 – Alec Leonard; (Canada) 51 – Jared Woolley; (Canada) 59 – Oliver Bonk; (Canada) 92 – Jackson Edward	Wingers: (Canada) 7 – Easton Cowan; (United States) 11 – Ryder Boulton; (Finland) 12 – Kasper Halttunen; (Canada) 14 – Evan Van Gorp; (United States) 36 – Sawyer Boulton; (Canada) 37 – Kaeden Johnston; (Canada) 39 – Max McCue; (Russia) 70 – Ruslan Gazizov; (Canada) 86 – Denver Barkey; (Canada) 90 – Landon Sim	Centres: (Canada) 13 – Jacob Julien; (Canada) 23 – Sam O'Reilly; (Canada) 25 – Kaleb Lawrence; (Canada) 73 – William Nicholl; Coach: (Canada) Dale Hunter; General Manager: (Canada) Mark Hunter

=== Playoff scoring leaders ===
Note: GP = Games played; G = Goals; A = Assists; Pts = Points; PIM = Penalty minutes

Player	Team	GP	G	A	Pts	PIM
Easton Cowan	London Knights	18	10	24	34	18
Calum Ritchie	Oshawa Generals	21	8	22	30	16
Sandis Vilmanis	North Bay Battalion	16	10	17	27	4
Denver Barkey	London Knights	18	6	21	27	16
Kasper Halttunen	London Knights	18	17	9	26	14
Dylan Roobroeck	Oshawa Generals	21	11	15	26	28
Dalyn Wakely	North Bay Battalion	16	13	10	23	18
Beckett Sennecke	Oshawa Generals	16	10	12	22	21
Max McCue	London Knights	18	3	19	22	20
Owen Van Steensel	North Bay Battalion	16	7	13	20	21

=== Playoff leading goaltenders ===
Note: GP = Games played; Mins = Minutes played; W = Wins; L = Losses; GA = Goals Allowed; SO = Shutouts; GAA = Goals against average

Player	Team	GP	MINS	W	L	GA	SO	Sv%	GAA
Andrew Oke	Saginaw Spirit	6	329	5	0	10	1	0.938	1.83
Charlie Schenkel	Sault Ste. Marie Greyhounds	11	634	6	4	25	2	0.913	2.36
Sam Hillebrandt	Barrie Colts	5	315	2	3	13	1	0.938	2.48
Michael Simpson	London Knights	18	1043	15	2	45	1	0.908	2.59
Mike McIvor	North Bay Battalion	15	919	10	5	41	1	0.914	2.68

== Awards ==
Playoffs trophies
Trophy name	Recipient	Ref
J. Ross Robertson Cup; OHL Finals champion	London Knights	
Bobby Orr Trophy; Eastern Conference playoff champion	Oshawa Generals	
Wayne Gretzky Trophy; Western Conference playoff champion	London Knights	
Wayne Gretzky 99 Award; Playoffs MVP	Easton Cowan (London Knights)	
Regular season — Team trophies
Trophy name	Recipient	Ref
Hamilton Spectator Trophy; Team with best record	London Knights	
Leyden Trophy; East division champion	Oshawa Generals	
Emms Trophy; Central division champion	North Bay Battalion	
Bumbacco Trophy; West division champion	Saginaw Spirit	
Holody Trophy; Midwest division champion	London Knights	
Regular season — Executive awards
Trophy name	Recipient	Ref
Matt Leyden Trophy; Coach of the year	Derek Laxdal (Oshawa Generals)	
Jim Gregory Award; General manager of the year	Adam Dennis (North Bay Battalion)	
OHL Executive of the Year; Executive of the Year	–	
Regular season — Player awards
Trophy name	Recipient	Ref
Red Tilson Trophy; Most outstanding player	Easton Cowan (London Knights)	
Eddie Powers Memorial Trophy; Top scorer	David Goyette (Sudbury Wolves)	
Dave Pinkney Trophy; Lowest team goals against	Michael Simpson & Owen Willmore (London Knights)	
Max Kaminsky Trophy; Most outstanding defenceman	Zayne Parekh (Saginaw Spirit)	
Jim Mahon Memorial Trophy; Top scoring right winger	David Goyette (Sudbury Wolves)	
Emms Family Award; Rookie of the year	Jake O'Brien (Brantford Bulldogs)	
William Hanley Trophy; Most sportsmanlike player	Jett Luchanko (Guelph Storm)	
F. W. "Dinty" Moore Trophy; Best rookie GAA	Jack Ivankovic (Mississauga Steelheads)	
Bobby Smith Trophy; Scholastic player of the year	Carter George (Owen Sound Attack)	
Leo Lalonde Memorial Trophy; Overage player of the year	Matthew Sop (Kitchener Rangers)	
Jim Rutherford Trophy; Goaltender of the year	Jacob Oster (Oshawa Generals)	
Dan Snyder Memorial Trophy; Humanitarian of the year	Mason Vaccari (Kingston Frontenacs)	
Roger Neilson Memorial Award; Top academic college/university player	Thomas Sirman (Ottawa 67's)	
Ivan Tennant Memorial Award; Top academic high school player	Carter George (Owen Sound Attack)	
Mickey Renaud Captain's Trophy; Team captain that best exemplifies character and commitment	Braden Haché (Saginaw Spirit)	
Prospect player awards
Trophy name	Recipient	Ref
Jack Ferguson Award; First overall pick in priority selection	Ethan Belchetz (Windsor Spitfires)	
Tim Adams Memorial Trophy; OHL Cup MVP	Ethan Belchetz (Oakville Rangers)	

== All-Star teams ==
The OHL All-Star and All-Rookie Teams were selected by the OHL's general managers.

=== First team ===
- Dalibor Dvorský, Centre, Sudbury Wolves
- Quentin Musty, Left Wing, Sudbury Wolves
- Easton Cowan, Right Wing, London Knights
- Zayne Parekh, Defence, Saginaw Spirit
- Oliver Bonk, Defence, London Knights
- Jacob Oster, Goaltender, Oshawa Generals
- Derek Laxdal, Coach, Oshawa Generals

=== Second team ===
- Calum Ritchie, Centre, Oshawa Generals
- Denver Barkey, Left Wing, London Knights
- Anthony Romani, Right Wing, North Bay Battalion
- Hunter Brzustewicz, Defence, Kitchener Rangers
- Sam Dickinson, Defence, London Knights
- Michael Simpson, Goaltender, London Knights
- Dale Hunter, Coach, London Knights

=== Third team ===
- Owen Beck, Centre, Peterborough Petes/Saginaw Spirit
- Liam Greentree, Left Wing, Windsor Spitfires
- David Goyette, Right Wing, Sudbury Wolves
- Ty Nelson, Defence, North Bay Battalion
- Michael Buchinger, Defence, Guelph Storm
- Carter George, Goaltender, Owen Sound Attack
- Ryan Oulahen, Coach, North Bay Battalion

=== First All-Rookie team ===
- Jake O'Brien, Centre, Brantford Bulldogs
- Ryan Roobroeck, Left Wing, Niagara IceDogs
- Travis Hayes, Right Wing, Sault Ste. Marie Greyhounds
- Matthew Schaefer, Defence, Erie Otters
- Cameron Reid, Defence, Kitchener Rangers
- Carter George, Goaltender, Owen Sound Attack

=== Second All-Rookie team ===
- Sam O'Reilly, Centre, London Knights
- Cole Davis, Left Wing, Windsor Spitfires
- Tanner Lam, Right Wing, Kitchener Rangers
- Jakub Fibigr, Defence, Mississauga Steelheads
- Carson Cameron, Defence, Peterborough Petes
- Jack Ivankovic, Goaltender, Mississauga Steelheads

== 2024 OHL Priority Selection ==
On March 27, 2024, the league announced the results of the Ontario Hockey League Priory Selection Lottery. Each of the four non-playoff participated in the lottery, as the 20th place Niagara IceDogs had a 40% chance of winning, the 19th place Windsor Spitfires had a 30% chance of winning, the 18th place Peterborough Petes had a 20% chance of winning, and the 17th place Sarnia Sting had a 10% chance of winning. The Windsor Spitfires won the lottery and selected first overall and selected Ethan Belchetz from the Oakville Rangers with their selection. The entirety of the OHL Priority Selection Draft took place over two days, as rounds 1-3 took on April 12, while rounds 4-15 was on April 13.

These are the results for the first round of the draft:

#	Player	Nationality	OHL Team	Hometown	Minor Team
1	Ethan Belchetz (LW)	Canada	Windsor Spitfires	Oakville, Ontario	Oakville Rangers U16 (OMHA-SCTA)
2	Alessandro Di Iorio (C)	Canada	Sarnia Sting	Vaughan, Ontario	Vaughan Kings U16 (GTHL)
3	Colin Fitzgerald (C)	Canada	Peterborough Petes	Peterborough, Ontario	Peterborough Petes U16 (OMHA-ETA)
4	Braidy Wassilyn (C)	Canada	Niagara IceDogs	Campbellville, Ontario	Markham Majors U16 (GTHL)
5	Parker Vaughan (RW)	Canada	Barrie Colts	St. Thomas, Ontario	Elgin-Middlesex Canucks U16 (MHAO-ALI)
6	Cole Zurawski (RW)	Canada	Flint Firebirds	Etobicoke, Ontario	Mississauga Rebels U16 (GTHL)
7	Pierce Mbuyi (LW)	Canada	Owen Sound Attack	Mississauga, Ontario	Toronto Marlboros U16 (GTHL)
8	Caleb Malhotra (C)	Canada	Kingston Frontenacs	Toronto, Ontario	Vaughan Kings U16 (GTHL)
9	Alex McLean (C)	Canada	Guelph Storm	Perth, Ontario	Barrie Jr. Colts U16 (OMHA-ETA)
10	Tyler Challenger (LW)	Canada	Erie Otters	Mississauga, Ontario	North York Rangers U16 (GTHL)
11	Nathan Amidovski (C)	Canada	Ottawa 67's	Alliston, Ontario	Barrie Jr. Colts U16 (OMHA-ETA)
12	Luca Blonda (RD)	Canada	Sudbury Wolves	Sault Ste. Marie, Ontario	Pittsburgh Penguins Elite 15's (NPHL-15)
13	Adam Valentini (C)	Canada	Mississauga Steelheads	Toronto, Ontario	Toronto Marlboros U16 (GTHL)
14	Aiden O'Donnell (C)	Canada	Brantford Bulldogs	Cole Harbour, Nova Scotia	Steele Subaru U18 (NSU18MHL)
15	Evan Headrick (C)	Canada	Kitchener Rangers	Garden River, Ontario	Oakville Rangers U16 (OMHA-SCTA)
16	Ryder Carey (C)	Canada	North Bay Battalion	Hamilton, Ontario	Oakville Rangers U16 (OMHA-SCTA)
17	Brady Smith (RW)	Canada	Oshawa Generals	Mississauga, Ontario	North York Rangers U16 (GTHL)
18	Ryder Cali (C)	Canada	Sault Ste. Marie Greyhounds	Penetanguishene, Ontario	Markham Majors U16 (GTHL)
19	Dimian Zhilkin (RW)	Canada	Saginaw Spirit	Oakville, Ontario	Toronto Jr. Canadiens U16 (GTHL)
20	Logan Hawery (C)	Canada	London Knights	Barrie, Ontario	Barrie Jr. Colts U16 (OMHA-ETA)
21	Kohyn Eshkawkogan (RD)	Canada	Ottawa 67's	Manitoulin Island, Ontario	North York Rangers U16 (GTHL)

== 2024 CHL Import Draft ==
On July 3, 2024, the Canadian Hockey League conducted the 2024 CHL Import Draft, in which teams in all three CHL leagues participate in. The Windsor Spitfires held the first pick in the draft by a team in the OHL. The Spitfires selected Ilya Protas from Belarus with the OHL's first selection in the draft.

Below are the players who were selected in the first round by Ontario Hockey League teams in the 2024 CHL Import Draft.

#	Player	Nationality	OHL team	Hometown	Last team
3	Ilya Protas (LW)	Belarus	Windsor Spitfires	Vitebsk, Belarus	Des Moines Buccaneers (USHL)
6	Ruslan Karimov (LW)	Russia	Sarnia Sting	Almetyevsk, Russia	JHC Irbis (MHL)
9	Adam Novotný (C)	Czech Republic	Peterborough Petes	Hradec Králové, Czech Republic	Mountfield HK (CZE)
12	Gabriel Eliasson (LD)	Sweden	Niagara IceDogs	Kungsbacka, Sweden	HV 71 (SWE Jr.)
15	Emil Hemming (RW)	Finland	Barrie Colts	Vaasa, Finland	HC TPS (SM-Liiga)
18	Mitja Jokinen (LD)	Finland	Flint Firebirds	Raisio, Finland	TPS U-20 (FIN U-20)
21	Max Bleicher (LD)	Germany	Owen Sound Attack	Füssen, Germany	EV Füssen (OBERL)
24	PASS		Kingston Frontenacs		
27	Daniil Skvortsovl (LD)	Russia	Guelph Storm	Saint Petersburg, Russia	Krasnaya Armiya (MHL)
30	Noah Erliden (G)	Sweden	Erie Otters	Jönköping, Sweden	HV 71 (SWE-Jr.)
33	Filip Ekberg (C)	Sweden	Ottawa 67's	Uppsala, Sweden	Almtuna IS (SWE-2)
36	Jan Chovan (RW)	Slovakia	Sudbury Wolves	Bratislava, Slovakia	Tappara U-20 (FIN U-20)
39	Martin Vaculík (RW)	Czech Republic	Brampton Steelheads	Zlín, Czech Republic	PSG Berani Zlin Jr. (CZE Jr.)
42	Adrien Bartovic (C)	Czech Republic	Brantford Bulldogs	Pardubice, Czech Republic	Malmö Redhawks (SWE-Jr.)
45	Tomas Chrenko (LW)	Slovakia	Kitchener Rangers	Nitra, Slovakia	HK Nitra (SLO)
48	Natan Teshome (RW)	Finland	North Bay Battalion	Lappeenranta, Finland	Jokerit U-20 (FIN U-20)
51	Lauri Sinivuori (LW)	Finland	Oshawa Generals	Mikkeli, Finland	HIFK U-20) (FIN U-20)
54	Lukas David Holub (RD)	Czech Republic	Sault Ste. Marie Greyhounds	Atlanta, Georgia	HC Oceláři Třinec Jr. (CZE Jr.)
56	Igor Chernyshov (LW)	Russia	Saginaw Spirit	Penza, Russia	HC Dynamo Moscow (KHL)
58	Jesse Nurmi (LW)	Finland	London Knights	Valkeala, Finland	KooKoo (SM-Liiga)

== 2024 NHL entry draft ==
On June 28–29, 2024, the National Hockey League conducted the 2024 NHL entry draft at the Sphere in Las Vegas, Nevada. Beckett Sennecke of the Oshawa Generals was the highest player from the OHL to be selected, as he was taken with the 3rd overall pick by the Anaheim Ducks. A total of 39 OHL players were selected in the draft.

Below are the players selected from OHL teams at the NHL Entry Draft.

Round	#	Player	Nationality	NHL team	Hometown	OHL team
1	3	Beckett Sennecke (RW)	Canada	Anaheim Ducks	Toronto, Ontario	Oshawa Generals
1	9	Zayne Parekh (RD)	Canada	Calgary Flames	Nobleton, Ontario	Saginaw Spirit
1	11	Sam Dickinson (LD)	Canada	San Jose Sharks	Toronto, Ontario	London Knights
1	13	Jett Luchanko (C)	Canada	Philadelphia Flyers	London, Ontario	Guelph Storm
1	24	Cole Beaudoin (C)	Canada	Utah Hockey Club	Kanata, Ontario	Barrie Colts
1	26	Liam Greentree (LW)	Canada	Los Angeles Kings	Oshawa, Ontario	Windsor Spitfires
1	27	Marek Vanacker (LW)	Canada	Chicago Blackhawks	Delhi, Ontario	Brantford Bulldogs
1	31	Ben Danford (RD)	Canada	Toronto Maple Leafs	Madoc, Ontario	Oshawa Generals
1	32	Sam O'Reilly (RW)	Canada	Edmonton Oilers	Toronto, Ontario	London Knights
2	56	Lukas Fischer (LD)	United States	St. Louis Blues	Brighton, Michigan	Sarnia Sting
2	57	Carter George (G)	Canada	Los Angeles Kings	Thunder Bay, Ontario	Owen Sound Attack
2	62	Jacob Battaglia (LW)	Canada	Calgary Flames	Mississauga, Ontario	Kingston Frontenacs
2	63	Nathan Villeneuve (C)	Canada	Seattle Kraken	Ottawa, Ontario	Sudbury Wolves
3	68	Ethan Procyszyn (C)	Canada	Anaheim Ducks	Wasaga Beach, Ontario	North Bay Battalion
3	72	A.J. Spellacy (C)	United States	Chicago Blackhawks	Westlake, Ohio	Windsor Spitfires
3	74	Henry Mews (RD)	Canada	Calgary Flames	Ottawa, Ontario	Ottawa 67's
3	86	Luca Marrelli (RD)	Canada	Columbus Blue Jackets	Toronto, Ontario	Oshawa Generals
4	102	Owen Protz (LD)	Canada	Montreal Canadiens	Ottawa, Ontario	Brantford Bulldogs
4	104	Luke Ellinas (LW)	Canada	Ottawa Senators	Toronto, Ontario	Kitchener Rangers
4	109	Kevin He (LW)	Canada	Winnipeg Jets	Nobleton, Ontario	Niagara IceDogs
4	125	Riley Patterson (C)	Canada	Vancouver Canucks	Burlington, Ontario	Barrie Colts
4	126	Landon Miller (G)	Canada	Detroit Red Wings	Barrie, Ontario	Sault Ste. Marie Greyhounds
5	135	Owen Allard (C)	Canada	Utah Hockey Club	Ottawa, Ontario	Sault Ste. Marie Greyhounds
5	150	Luke Misa (C)	Canada	Calgary Flames	Oakville, Ontario	Mississauga Steelheads
5	159	Nathan Aspinall (LW)	Canada	New York Rangers	Markham, Ontario	Flint Firebirds
5	160	Connor Clattenburg (LW)	Canada	Edmonton Oilers	Arnprior, Ontario	Flint Firebirds
6	162	Anthony Romani (RW)	Canada	Vancouver Canucks	Pickering, Ontario	North Bay Battalion
6	163	Ty Henry (LD)	Canada	Chicago Blackhawks	Toronto, Ontario	Erie Otters
6	164	Jared Woolley (LD)	Canada	Los Angeles Kings	Port Hope, Ontario	London Knights
6	174	Stevie Leskovar (LD)	Canada	Minnesota Wild	Cambridge, Ontario	Mississauga Steelheads
6	180	Trent Swick (LW)	Canada	Vegas Golden Knights	Thorold, Ontario	Kitchener Rangers
6	181	Kaden Pitre (C)	Canada	Tampa Bay Lightning	Stouffville, Ontario	Flint Firebirds
6	187	Kieron Walton (LW)	Canada	Winnipeg Jets	Toronto, Ontario	Sudbury Wolves
6	192	Dalyn Wakely (C)	Canada	Edmonton Oilers	Port Hope, Ontario	North Bay Battalion
7	196	William Nicholl (C)	Canada	Edmonton Oilers	Manotick, Ontario	London Knights
7	202	Jakub Fibigr (LD)	Czech Republic	Seattle Kraken	Uničov, Czech Republic	Mississauga Steelheads
7	216	Sam McCue (RW)	Canada	Toronto Maple Leafs	Sudbury, Ontario	Owen Sound Attack
7	219	Ryerson Leenders (G)	Canada	Buffalo Sabres	Nanticoke, Ontario	Mississauga Steelheads
7	223	Finn Harding (RD)	Canada	Pittsburgh Penguins	Toronto, Ontario	Mississauga Steelheads

Preceded by 2022–23 OHL season	OHL seasons	Succeeded by 2024–25 OHL season
