= Ethan Belchetz =

Canadian ice hockey player (born 2008)

- Born: March 30, 2008 (age 18) Oakville, Ontario, Canada
- Height: 6 ft 5 in (196 cm)
- Weight: 228 lb (103 kg; 16 st 4 lb)
- Position: Left wing
- Shoots: Left
- OHL team: Windsor Spitfires
- NHL draft: 17th overall, 2026; Utah Mammoth

Ethan Belchetz (born March 30, 2008) is a Canadian junior ice hockey player who is a left winger for the Windsor Spitfires of the Ontario Hockey League (OHL). He was drafted 17th overall by the Utah Mammoth in the 2026 NHL entry draft.

== Playing career ==
Belchetz played youth hockey at the AAA level for the Oakville Rangers. During the 2022–23 season, he led the league in scoring and recorded 46 goals and 38 assists in 34 games. Following the season he was named the Ontario Minor Hockey Association West U16 AAA Player of the Year. During the 2024 OHL Cup he led the team in scoring with five goals and six assists in seven games, and was subsequently awarded the Tim Adams Memorial Trophy as MVP.

On April 11, 2024, Belchetz was drafted first overall by the Windsor Spitfires in the 2024 OHL Priority Selection and received the Jack Ferguson Award. He explored his options, including the United States Hockey League, and the NCAA Division I, with visits to the University of Michigan and Michigan State University. On May 4, 2024, he signed with the Spitfires. During the 2024–25 season, in his debut weekend for the Spitfires, he recorded four goals and four assists in three games. During his first game he recorded two assists in a game against the Saginaw Spirit. He then recorded four goals and two assists in a 12–2 victory against the Kitchener Rangers. His four goals were the most by a Spitfires 16-year old rookie since Taylor Hall on March 6, 2008, while his six points were the most in a single game by an OHL 16-year-old rookie since Matt Puempel on March 13, 2010. He was subsequently named the OHL Rookie of the Week for the week ending September 30, 2024. At season's end, Belchetz was named to the OHL Second All-Rookie Team.

On June 26, 2026, he was drafted in the first round, 17th overall, by the Utah Mammoth in the 2026 NHL entry draft.

== International play ==
In July 2024, Belchetz was invited to Hockey Canada's U-17 development camp.

== Career statistics ==
			Regular season					Playoffs
Season	Team	League	GP	G	A	Pts	PIM	GP	G	A	Pts	PIM
2023–24	Hamilton Kilty B's	GOJHL	1	1	0	1	0	—	—	—	—	—
2024–25	Windsor Spitfires	OHL	56	17	21	38	48	—	—	—	—	—
2025–26	Windsor Spitfires	OHL	57	34	25	59	45	—	—	—	—	—
OHL totals			113	51	46	97	93	—	—	—	—	—

== Awards and honours ==
Award	Year	Ref
OHL
Tim Adams Memorial Trophy	2024	
Jack Ferguson Award	2024	
Second All-Rookie Team	2025	

Awards and achievements
Preceded by Caleb Desnoyers	Utah Mammoth first-round draft pick 2026	Succeeded by Incumbent
