= Isaiah George =

Canadian ice hockey player (born 2004)

- George with the New York Islanders in 2024
- Born: February 15, 2004 (age 22) Oakville, Ontario, Canada
- Height: 6 ft 1 in (185 cm)
- Weight: 203 lb (92 kg; 14 st 7 lb)
- Position: Defence
- Shoots: Left
- NHL team (P) Cur. team: New York Islanders; Hamilton Hammers (AHL)
- NHL draft: 98th overall, 2022; New York Islanders
- Playing career: 2024–present

Isaiah George (born February 15, 2004) is a Canadian professional ice hockey player who is a defenceman for the Hamilton Hammers of the American Hockey League (AHL) while under contract to the New York Islanders of the National Hockey League (NHL). He was drafted 98th overall by the Islanders in the 2022 NHL entry draft.

== Playing career ==
=== Junior ===
During the 2021–22 season, George recorded six goals and 17 assists in 67 regular-season games for the London Knights. During the 2022–23 season, he recorded seven goals and 15 assists in 54 regular season games for the London Knights.

During the 2023–24 season, he recorded six goals and 24 assists in 68 regular-season games for the London Knights. The Knights won the Hamilton Spectator Trophy as the top team in the regular season. During the playoffs, he recorded four goals and eight assists in 18 games to help the Knights win the J. Ross Robertson Cup.

He finished his career with the Knights with 19 goals and 56 assists in 189 regular-season games.

=== Professional ===
On September 13, 2023, the New York Islanders signed George to a three-year, entry-level contract.

George began the 2024–25 season with the Islanders' American Hockey League (AHL) affiliate, the Bridgeport Islanders (now the Hamilton Hammers). On November 5, 2024, he was recalled by the New York Islanders. Prior to being recalled, he recorded one goal and one assist in four games for the Bridgeport Islanders. Due to injuries to Islanders' defencemen Mike Reilly, Adam Pelech and Alexander Romanov, he made his NHL debut later that night in a game against the Pittsburgh Penguins. He played 15:41 in his debut, with four shifts in the first period, and 17 shifts between the second and third periods. He was elevated to the top pair with defensive partner Noah Dobson for his second NHL game. George scored his first NHL goal on December 21, in New York's 6–3 win against the Toronto Maple Leafs.

== Career statistics ==
			Regular season					Playoffs
Season	Team	League	GP	G	A	Pts	PIM	GP	G	A	Pts	PIM
2019–20	Oakville Blades	OJHL	1	0	0	0	0	1	0	0	0	0
2021–22	London Knights	OHL	67	6	17	23	32	—	—	—	—	—
2022–23	London Knights	OHL	54	7	15	22	14	20	0	3	3	10
2023–24	London Knights	OHL	68	6	24	30	54	18	4	8	12	4
2024–25	Bridgeport Islanders	AHL	33	4	10	14	6	—	—	—	—	—
2024–25	New York Islanders	NHL	33	1	4	5	6	—	—	—	—	—
2025–26	Bridgeport Islanders	AHL	47	2	16	18	20	2	0	0	0	0
2025–26	New York Islanders	NHL	4	0	1	1	0	—	—	—	—	—
NHL totals			37	1	5	6	6	—	—	—	—	—

== Awards and honours ==
Award	Year	Ref
OHL
J. Ross Robertson Cup champion	2024	
