= Sandis Vilmanis =

Latvian ice hockey player (born 2004)

- Born: 23 January 2004 (age 22) Riga, Latvia
- Height: 6 ft 1 in (185 cm)
- Weight: 192 lb (87 kg; 13 st 10 lb)
- Position: Winger
- Shoots: Left
- NHL team: Florida Panthers
- National team: Latvia
- NHL draft: 157th overall, 2022; Florida Panthers
- Playing career: 2024–present

Sandis Vilmanis (born 23 January 2004) is a Latvian professional ice hockey player who is a winger for the Florida Panthers of the National Hockey League (NHL).

== Playing career ==
On 2 March 2024, Vilmanis signed a three-year, entry-level contract with the Florida Panthers.

Vilmanis made his NHL debut on 10 January 2026, in Florida's 3–2 win against the Ottawa Senators. On 27 January, Vilmanis scored his first NHL goal in a 4–3 loss to the Utah Mammoth.

== International play ==
Vilmanis represented the Latvia national team at the 2026 Winter Olympics.

== Career statistics ==
=== Regular season and playoffs ===
			Regular season					Playoffs
Season	Team	League	GP	G	A	Pts	PIM	GP	G	A	Pts	PIM
2019–20	Luleå HF	U16 Elit	23	30	34	64	40	6	5	6	11	2
2019–20	Luleå HF	J18	3	1	0	1	0	—	—	—	—	—
2020–21	HK Riga	MHL	22	2	2	4	6	—	—	—	—	—
2021–22	Luleå HF	J20	40	18	14	32	8	5	0	0	0	2
2022–23	Sarnia Sting	OHL	62	20	25	45	14	14	4	3	7	0
2023–24	Sarnia Sting	OHL	30	10	18	28	6	—	—	—	—	—
2023–24	North Bay Battalion	OHL	30	28	11	39	4	16	10	17	27	4
2024–25	Charlotte Checkers	AHL	61	9	18	27	12	11	3	4	7	10
2025–26	Charlotte Checkers	AHL	48	17	21	38	26	3	1	0	1	0
2025–26	Florida Panthers	NHL	19	3	2	5	4	—	—	—	—	—
NHL totals			19	3	2	5	4	—	—	—	—	—

=== International ===
Year	Team	Event	GP	G	A	Pts	PIM
2021	Latvia U18	WJC-18	3	1	1	2	0
2022	Latvia U18	WJC-18	4	1	2	3	0
2022	Latvia U20	WJC-20 (D1A)	5	2	1	3	0
2022	Latvia U20	WJC-20	5	0	1	1	2
2023	Latvia U20	WJC-20	6	1	1	2	4
2024	Latvia U20	WJC-20	5	2	2	4	0
2026	Latvia	OG	4	0	0	0	2
2026	Latvia	WC	8	4	7	11	4
Junior totals			28	7	8	15	6
Senior totals			12	4	7	11	6
