= Oliver Bonk =

Canadian ice hockey player (born 2005)

- Born: January 9, 2005 (age 21) Ottawa, Ontario, Canada
- Height: 6 ft 2 in (188 cm)
- Weight: 180 lb (82 kg; 12 st 12 lb)
- Position: Defence
- Shoots: Right
- NHL team: Philadelphia Flyers
- NHL draft: 22nd overall, 2023; Philadelphia Flyers
- Playing career: 2025–present

Oliver Bonk (born January 9, 2005) is a Canadian professional ice hockey defenceman for the Philadelphia Flyers of the National Hockey League (NHL).

== Playing career ==
During the 2022–23 season, in his first full season with the London Knights, Bonk recorded ten goals and 30 assists in 67 games. He ranked second among rookie defencemen in the OHL with 40 points, and ranked first with 17 power-play points and four short-handed points. Bonk was named to the league's Second All-Rookie Team.

Following the conclusion of the season, Bonk was drafted 22nd overall by the Philadelphia Flyers. Bonk was one of two of Philadelphia's first-round selections, the other being Matvei Michkov. The Flyers had acquired the 22nd pick from the Columbus Blue Jackets via trade, who in turn had acquired the pick from the Los Angeles Kings at the 2022–23 trade deadline.

Bonk missed several weeks of the 2023–24 season while participating in the 2024 World Junior Ice Hockey Championships with the Canadian junior team. After a lengthy goalscoring drought that had begun in the final months of the 2022–23 season, coach Dale Hunter shifted Bonk's power play position, resulting in a significant increase in goalscoring for the remainder of the season. He finished the regular season with 24 goals and 43 assists in 60 games, and was named to the OHL First All-Star Team. The Knights received the Hamilton Spectator Trophy as the top team in the regular season, and in the playoffs reached the OHL Finals for the second consecutive season, where they defeated the Oshawa Generals to hoist the J. Ross Robertson Cup. Bonk had 7 goals and 9 assists in the championship run, and was cited as a key part of the "core" of the team. He thereafter played in the 2024 Memorial Cup, where the Knights lost the championship game to the Saginaw Spirit.

Bonk returned to London during the 2024–25 season, before being named an alternate captain on October 16, 2024. The Knights won a second consecutive Robertson Cup. He recorded 11 goals and 29 assists in 52 regular season games and was named a Second Team All-Star. During the playoffs he recorded two goals and 12 assists in 17 games and helped the Knights defeat the Medicine Hat Tigers during the 2025 Memorial Cup.

Bonk was called up by the Flyers on April 14, 2026, and scored his first NHL goal that evening against the Montreal Canadiens.

== International play ==
Bonk made his debut with the Canada junior team at the 2024 World Junior Championships. With the quarterfinals game against the Czech Republic junior team tied 11 seconds from going to overtime, a puck redirected into the Canadian net off Bonk's stick, and as a result Canada was eliminated. He remarked that it was a "bad bounce," and vowed to use the overall experience as motivation, saying "we're not going to mope about it and feel bad about ourselves. It was a world-class atmosphere."

== Personal life ==
Bonk is the son of Czech former player Radek Bonk. Oliver was born in Ottawa, Ontario while Radek was playing for the Ottawa Senators.

He is fairly fluent in Czech due to his father's ancestry.

== Career statistics ==
=== Regular season and playoffs ===
			Regular season					Playoffs
Season	Team	League	GP	G	A	Pts	PIM	GP	G	A	Pts	PIM
2021–22	St. Thomas Stars	GOJHL	32	5	27	32	14	6	0	1	1	6
2021–22	London Knights	OHL	10	0	3	3	6	7	1	0	1	2
2022–23	London Knights	OHL	67	10	30	40	38	21	0	11	11	6
2023–24	London Knights	OHL	60	24	43	67	32	18	7	9	16	8
2024–25	London Knights	OHL	52	11	29	40	36	17	2	12	14	14
2025–26	Lehigh Valley Phantoms	AHL	46	6	13	19	22	—	—	—	—	—
2025–26	Philadelphia Flyers	NHL	1	1	1	2	0	1	0	0	0	0
NHL totals			1	1	1	2	0	1	0	0	0	0

=== International ===
Year	Team	Event	Result	GP	G	A	Pts	PIM
2024	Canada	WJC	5th	5	0	3	3	2
2025	Canada	WJC	5th	5	1	1	2	2
Junior totals				10	1	4	5	4

== Awards and honours ==
Award	Year	Ref
CHL
Memorial Cup champion	2025	
OHL
Second All-Rookie Team	2023	
J. Ross Robertson Cup champion	2024, 2025	
First All-Star Team	2024	
Second All-Star Team	2025	

Awards and achievements
Preceded by Matvei Michkov	Philadelphia Flyers' first-round draft pick 2023	Succeeded by Jett Luchanko
