= Devin Kaplan =

American ice hockey player (born 2004)

- Born: January 10, 2004 (age 22) Bridgewater, New Jersey, U.S.
- Height: 6 ft 2 in (188 cm)
- Weight: 199 lb (90 kg; 14 st 3 lb)
- Position: Right wing
- Shoots: Right
- NHL team (P) Cur. team Former teams: Seattle Kraken; Coachella Valley Firebirds (AHL); Philadelphia Flyers
- NHL draft: 69th overall, 2022; Philadelphia Flyers
- Playing career: 2025–present

Devin Kaplan (born January 10, 2004) is an American professional ice hockey forward for the Coachella Valley Firebirds in the American Hockey League (AHL) while under contract to the Seattle Kraken of the National Hockey League (NHL). He was selected in the third round, 69th overall, of the 2022 NHL entry draft by the Philadelphia Flyers.

== Playing career ==
Kaplan signed a three-year entry level contract with the Flyers on April 15, 2025. He made his NHL debut two days later in a 5–4 loss to the Buffalo Sabres.

On October 1, 2026, Kaplan was traded to the Seattle Kraken for David Goyette.

== Career statistics ==
			Regular season					Playoffs
Season	Team	League	GP	G	A	Pts	PIM	GP	G	A	Pts	PIM
2020–21	U.S. NTDP	USHL	30	6	18	24	32	—	—	—	—	—
2021–22	U.S. NTDP	USHL	22	8	10	18	36	—	—	—	—	—
2022–23	Boston University	HE	40	10	13	23	49	—	—	—	—	—
2023–24	Boston University	HE	37	5	18	23	34	—	—	—	—	—
2024–25	Boston University	HE	38	10	8	18	65	—	—	—	—	—
2024–25	Philadelphia Flyers	NHL	1	0	0	0	0	—	—	—	—	—
2025–26	Lehigh Valley Phantoms	AHL	49	5	8	13	62	—	—	—	—	—
NHL totals			1	0	0	0	0	—	—	—	—	—
