= Ben Danford =

Canadian ice hockey player (born 2006)

- Danford in October 2026
- Born: February 6, 2006 (age 20) Madoc, Ontario, Canada
- Height: 6 ft 2 in (188 cm)
- Weight: 200 lb (91 kg; 14 st 4 lb)
- Position: Defence
- Shoots: Right
- NHL team (P) Cur. team: Toronto Maple Leafs; Toronto Marlies (AHL)
- NHL draft: 31st overall, 2024; Toronto Maple Leafs
- Playing career: 2026–present

Ben Danford (born February 6, 2006) is a Canadian professional ice hockey defenceman for the Toronto Marlies of the American Hockey League (AHL) as a prospect to the Toronto Maple Leafs of the National Hockey League (NHL). He was drafted 31st overall by the Maple Leafs in the 2024 NHL entry draft.

== Playing career ==
On April 20, 2022, Danford was drafted 14th overall by the Oshawa Generals in the 2022 OHL Draft. On May 13, 2022, he signed with the Generals. During the 2022–23 season, in his first season with the Generals, he recorded four goals and 17 assists in 63 regular season games. During the 2023–24 season, he recorded one goal and 32 assists in 64 regular season games. During the playoffs, he recorded four goals and six assists in 21 games.

On June 28, 2024, Danford was drafted 31st overall by the Toronto Maple Leafs in the 2024 NHL entry draft. He was later signed to a three-year, entry-level contract with the Maple Leafs on August 2, 2024. During a Maple Leafs' rookie camp scrimmage, Danford suffered a concussion after receiving a hit to the head by invitee Marshall Finnie. The concussion caused him to miss the Prospect Showdown against the Montreal Canadiens and the Maple Leafs training camp. On September 30, Danford was loaned back to the Oshawa Generals. Upon his return, the Generals named him the team captain for the 2024–25 season, which he called “surreal.” He had 5 goals and 20 assists in 61 games in the regular season, and was named a Third Team All-Star. In the postseason, Danford led the Generals on another deep run to the OHL Finals, where they faced the London Knights for the second consecutive year, and were again defeated. Danford had 2 goals and 3 assists in 21 playoff games.

On October 30, 2025, the Generals traded Danford along with Zackary Sandhu to the Brantford Bulldogs in exchange for Aiden O'Donnell, Lucas Moore, Luca DiPlacido, and nine OHL draft picks.

== International play ==
Medal record

Representing Canada

Ice hockey

World Junior Championships
Bronze medal – third place	2026 United States	

Danford represented Canada at the 2026 World Junior Ice Hockey Championships and won a bronze medal.

== Personal life ==
Danford's father, Allan, was drafted in the 15th round of the 1987 OHL Draft by the Toronto Marlboros. His family owns a construction company, Danford Construction.

== Career statistics ==
=== Regular season and playoffs ===
			Regular season					Playoffs
Season	Team	League	GP	G	A	Pts	PIM	GP	G	A	Pts	PIM
2022–23	Oshawa Generals	OHL	63	4	17	21	42	5	0	1	1	0
2023–24	Oshawa Generals	OHL	64	1	32	33	25	21	4	6	10	22
2024–25	Oshawa Generals	OHL	61	5	20	25	68	21	2	3	5	4
2025–26	Oshawa Generals	OHL	8	1	3	4	5	—	—	—	—	—
2025–26	Brantford Bulldogs	OHL	37	2	14	16	8	13	1	2	3	9
2025–26	Toronto Marlies	AHL	—	—	—	—	—	16	1	2	3	6
OHL totals			233	13	86	99	148	60	7	12	19	35

=== International ===
Year	Team	Event	Result	GP	G	A	Pts	PIM
2022	Canada Red	U17	2nd place, silver medalist(s)	7	1	1	2	10
2023	Canada	HG18	1st place, gold medalist(s)	5	0	0	0	4
Junior totals				12	1	1	2	14

== Awards and honours ==
Award	Year	Ref
OHL
Third All-Star Team	2025	
AHL
Calder Cup champion	2026	

Awards and achievements
Preceded by Easton Cowan	Toronto Maple Leafs first-round draft pick 2024	Succeeded by Gavin McKenna
