= Hunter Haight =

Canadian ice hockey player (born 2004)

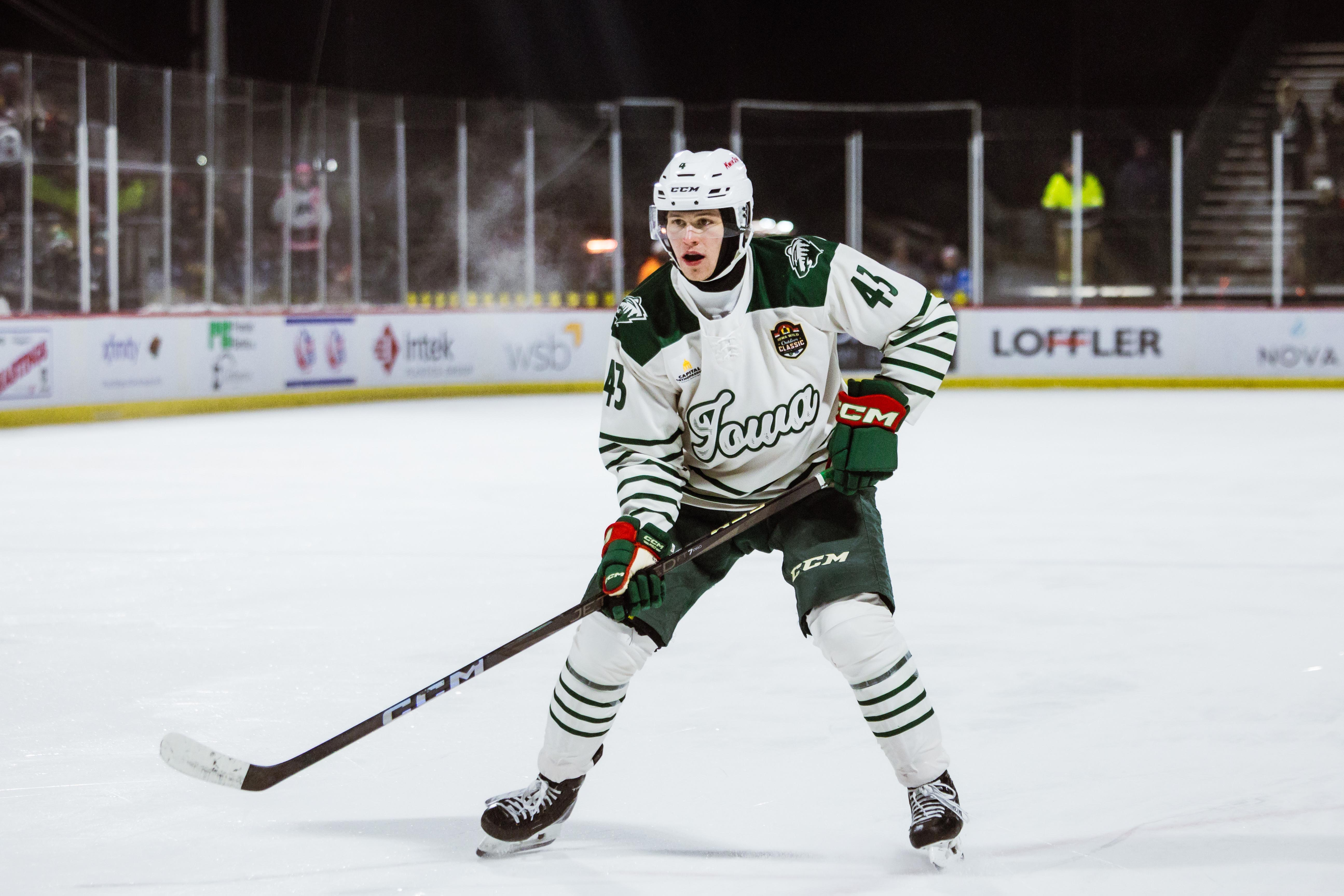
- Haight with the Iowa Wild in January 2026
- Born: April 4, 2004 (age 22) Strathroy-Caradoc, Ontario, Canada
- Height: 5 ft 10 in (178 cm)
- Weight: 173 lb (78 kg; 12 st 5 lb)
- Position: Centre
- Shoots: Right
- NHL team (P) Cur. team: Minnesota Wild; Iowa Wild (AHL)
- NHL draft: 47th overall, 2022; Minnesota Wild
- Playing career: 2024–present

Hunter Haight (born April 4, 2004) is a Canadian professional ice hockey centre for the Iowa Wild of the American Hockey League (AHL) as a prospect to the Minnesota Wild of the National Hockey League (NHL). He was selected by the Wild in the second round, 47th overall, in the 2022 NHL entry draft.

== Playing career ==
Haight grew up playing ice hockey and was a top player for the Elgin Middlesex Chiefs. During the 2019–20 season, he led the league in scoring, recording 84 points in 49 games while helping the Chiefs to the league championship. He also appeared in four games for the London Nationals of the Greater Ontario Hockey League (GOHL) during the season. After the season, he was selected by the Barrie Colts with the ninth overall pick of the Ontario Hockey League (OHL) draft. Appearing in 69 games in 2021–22 after the 2020–21 season was canceled, he posted 23 goals and 46 points.

Haight was selected by the Minnesota Wild in the second round (47th overall) of the 2022 NHL entry draft. After posting nine points in 20 games for the Colts in 2022–23, he was traded midseason to the Saginaw Spirit and scored 51 points in 42 games. The following season for the Spirit, he helped them win the Memorial Cup and recorded 25 goals and 67 points in 68 games. Haight played for the Iowa Wild of the American Hockey League (AHL) during the 2024–25 season, scoring 54 points in 67 games. He was initially among the last cuts by the Minnesota Wild prior to the 2025–26 NHL season, but was recalled to begin the season and made his NHL debut on October 9 against the St. Louis Blues.

== Personal life ==
Haight was born on April 4, 2004, in Strathroy-Caradoc, Ontario. His father is a police officer and served as the leader of the London, Ontario, tactical rescue team.

== Career statistics ==
			Regular season					Playoffs
Season	Team	League	GP	G	A	Pts	PIM	GP	G	A	Pts	PIM
2019–20	London Nationals	GOJHL	4	1	1	2	0	—	—	—	—	—
2021–22	Barrie Colts	OHL	63	22	19	41	13	6	1	4	5	0
2022–23	Barrie Colts	OHL	20	3	6	9	4	—	—	—	—	—
2022–23	Saginaw Spirit	OHL	42	18	33	51	10	11	3	5	8	18
2023–24	Saginaw Spirit	OHL	68	25	42	67	28	17	9	4	13	10
2024–25	Iowa Wild	AHL	67	20	14	34	30	—	—	—	—	—
2025–26	Minnesota Wild	NHL	9	1	1	2	4	—	—	—	—	—
2025–26	Iowa Wild	AHL	54	18	14	32	22	—	—	—	—	—
NHL totals			9	1	1	2	4	—	—	—	—	—
