= Kasper Halttunen =

Finnish ice hockey player (born 2005)

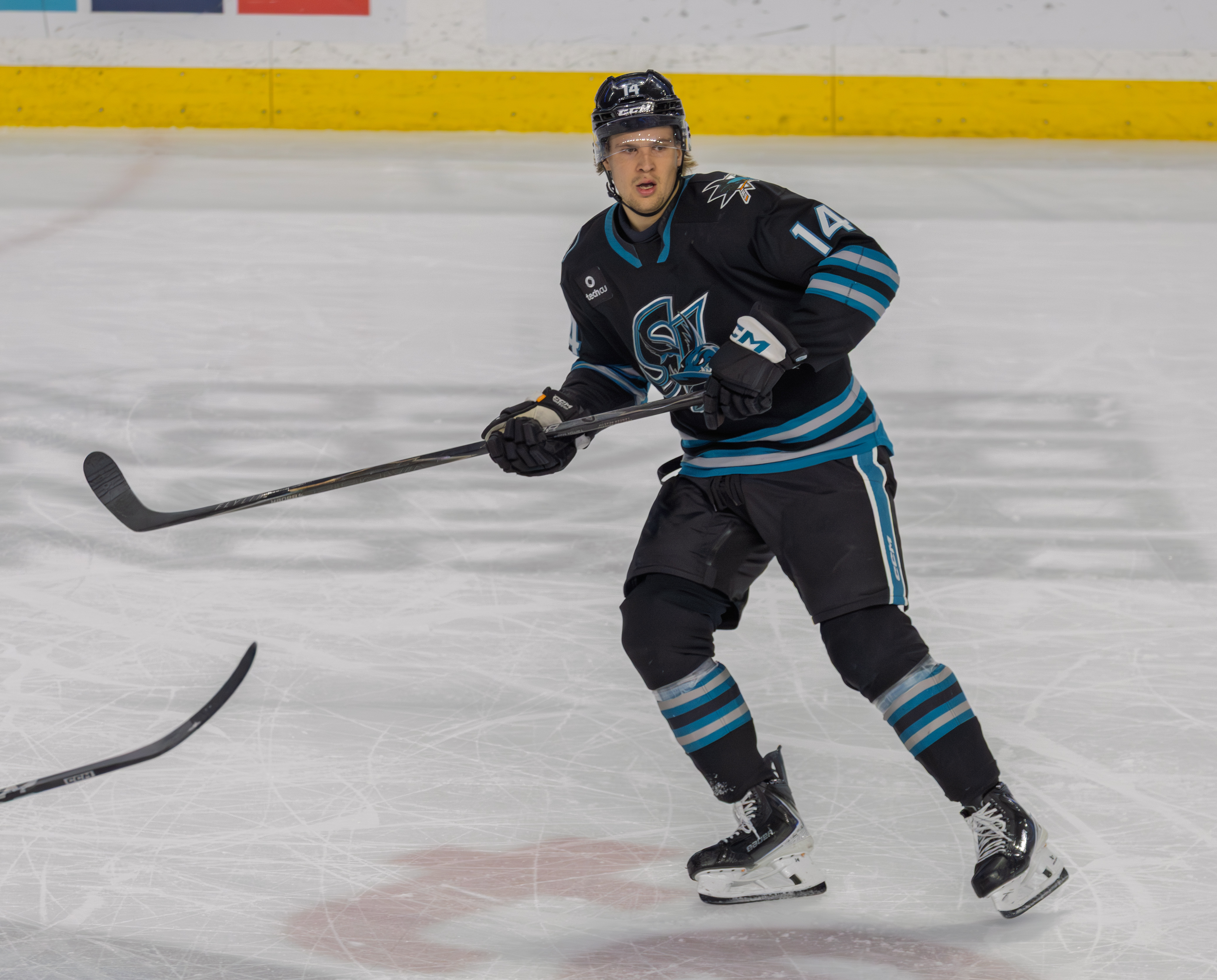
- Halttunen with the San Jose Barracuda in 2026
- Born: 7 June 2005 (age 21) Helsinki, Finland
- Height: 6 ft 3 in (191 cm)
- Weight: 215 lb (98 kg; 15 st 5 lb)
- Position: Winger
- Shoots: Right
- NHL team (P) Cur. team Former teams: Ottawa Senators; Belleville Senators (AHL); HIFK
- NHL draft: 36th overall, 2023; San Jose Sharks
- Playing career: 2022–present

Kasper Halttunen (born 7 June 2005) is a Finnish professional ice hockey player who is a winger for the Belleville Senators of the American Hockey League (AHL) while under contract to the Ottawa Senators of the National Hockey League (NHL). Halttunen was drafted 36th overall by the San Jose Sharks in the second round of the 2023 NHL entry draft.

== Playing career ==
Halttunen first joined Jokerit's development program but signed with IFK Helsingfors on a 2+1 contract in October 2022 after being named the Finnish U20 league's rookie of the year for the preceding 2021–22 season. He made his professional debut for Helsingfors on 24 September 2022, in a game against KooKoo Kouvola. He recorded one assist for one point in 27 games played with Helsingfors in the 2022–23 season. On 14 March 2023, he and teammate Otto Salin were loaned to Kiekko-Vantaa of the second-tier league Mestis. In three appearances in Mestis, he scored one goal and three points. Kiekko-Vanta made the playoffs and Halttunen added one goal and two points in three playoff games. He also made one playoff appearance for Helsingfors, going scorless.

The London Knights of the Ontario Hockey League (OHL) selected Haltunnen with the 41st overall selection in the 2022 Canadian Hockey League (CHL) Import Draft. In August 2023, he signed for the Knights. In 57 games he recorded 32 goals and 61 points. In the 2024 playoffs Halttunen led the OHL in playoff goals as the Knights won the J. Ross Robertson Cup, finishing with 17 goals and 26 points in 18 playoff games. As OHL champions, the Knights played in the 2024 Memorial Cup in Saginaw, where they reached the championship game but were defeated 4–3 by the host Saginaw Spirit, in a rematch of the teams' semi-final series during the OHL playoffs. Halttunen was named to the Memorial Cup All-Star Team.

Halttunen was selected 36th overall by the San Jose Sharks of the National Hockey League (NHL) in the second round of the 2023 NHL entry draft. He was the first Finnish player selected in the draft. Halttunen was signed to a three-year, entry-level contract with San Jose on 12 July 2023. After participating in the San Jose Sharks' training camp, Halttunen was assigned to play with San Jose's American Hockey League (AHL) affiliate, the San Jose Barracuda, to begin the 2024–25 season. He had four points in six games before being loaned back to the Knights for the remainder of the season. On 26 November 2024, he was suspended for four games by the OHL after hitting a Saginaw Spirit player from behind. In 38 games with the Knights he tallied 21 goals and 41 points. The London Knights won their second consecutive Robertson Cup, with Halttunen recording 21 points. He scored nine goals in the championship series against the Oshawa Generals, the most for an OHL player in the playoff finals since Jonathan Cheechoo in 1999. In recognition of this, Halttunen received the Wayne Gretzky 99 Award as the most valuable player of the postseason. The Knights went on to compete at the 2025 Memorial Cup, ultimately defeating the Medicine Hat Tigers for the title.

The Sharks assigned Halttunen to the Barracuda for the 2025–26 season. In 69 games with the Barracuda, he marked 16 goals and 35 points. The Barracuda qualified for the 2026 Calder Cup playoffs and faced the Henderson Silver Knights in the first round best-of-three series. Ultimately, the Silver Knights swept the Barracuda and Halttunen added one goal in the series.

On 23 June 2026, Halttunen was traded to the Ottawa Senators alongside forwards William Eklund and Brandon Svoboda for a 2026 first-round pick. He was assigned to Ottawa's AHL affiliate, the Belleville Senators, to start the 2026–27 season.

== International play ==
Medal record

Men's ice hockey

Representing Finland

World Junior Championships
Silver medal – second place	2025 Canada	

IIHF World U18 Championships
Bronze medal – third place	2022 Germany	

Halttunen represented Finland under-18 team at the 2022 World U18 Championships where he recorded three goals and two assists in six games and won a bronze medal. At the 2022 Hlinka Gretzky Cup, he won a bronze medal as the Finnish team beat Czechia. He returned to the U18 team for the 2023 World U18 Championships where he was named captain and led the team in scoring with ten points in five games. He was selected for Finland's junior team for the 2024 World Junior Championships. In nine games at the tournament, he recorded three goals and six points in seven games as Finland came fourth. He won a silver medal at the 2025 World Junior Championships while representing the Finland junior team. He recorded one goal and three assists in the tournament.

== Career statistics ==
Bold indicates led league

=== Regular season and playoffs ===
			Regular season					Playoffs
Season	Team	League	GP	G	A	Pts	PIM	GP	G	A	Pts	PIM
2021–22	Jokerit	U20	41	24	14	38	75	1	1	0	1	25
2022–23	HIFK	U20	18	18	6	24	14	3	0	0	0	0
2022–23	HIFK	Liiga	27	0	1	1	8	1	0	0	0	0
2022–23	Kiekko-Vantaa	Mestis	3	1	2	3	2	3	1	1	2	4
2023–24	London Knights	OHL	57	32	29	61	61	18	**17**	9	26	14
2024–25	London Knights	OHL	38	21	20	41	38	17	15	6	21	18
2024–25	San Jose Barracuda	AHL	6	2	2	4	2	—	—	—	—	—
2025–26	San Jose Barracuda	AHL	69	16	19	35	45	2	1	0	1	0
Liiga totals			27	0	1	1	8	1	0	0	0	0

=== International ===
Year	Team	Event	Result	GP	G	A	Pts	PIM
2021	Finland	HG18	4th	5	0	0	0	6
2022	Finland	U18	3rd place, bronze medalist(s)	6	3	2	5	0
2022	Finland	HG18	3rd place, bronze medalist(s)	5	1	2	3	4
2023	Finland	U18	5th	5	6	4	10	6
2024	Finland	WJC	4th	7	3	3	6	4
2025	Finland	WJC	2nd place, silver medalist(s)	7	1	3	4	6
Junior totals				35	14	14	28	26

== Awards and honours ==
Award	Year	Ref
CHL
Memorial Cup All-Star Team	2024	
Memorial Cup champion	2025	
OHL
J. Ross Robertson Cup champion	2024, 2025	
Wayne Gretzky 99 Award	2025	
