= Easton Cowan =

Canadian ice hockey player (born 2005)

- Born: May 20, 2005 (age 21) Strathroy, Ontario, Canada
- Height: 5 ft 11 in (180 cm)
- Weight: 190 lb (86 kg; 13 st 8 lb)
- Position: Forward
- Shoots: Left
- NHL team: Toronto Maple Leafs
- NHL draft: 28th overall, 2023; Toronto Maple Leafs
- Playing career: 2025–present

Easton Christopher Cowan (born May 20, 2005) is a Canadian professional ice hockey player who is a forward for the Toronto Maple Leafs of the National Hockey League (NHL). He was drafted by the Maple Leafs in the first round, 28th overall, of the 2023 NHL entry draft.

== Early life ==
Cowan was born in Strathroy, Ontario but moved to his grandparents' farm in the nearby town of Mount Brydges at age 13. His father, Chris, claims that he was named partially after the hockey equipment brand, Easton. Former NHL player Darren McCarty is his cousin.

== Playing career ==
In his first full season in the OHL in 2022–23, for the London Knights, Cowan showed offensive potential by posting 20 goals and 33 assists for 53 points through 68 regular-season games. He increased his scoring pace in the postseason, notching 21 points in 20 appearances to help the Knights reach the J. Ross Robertson Cup finals against the Peterborough Petes. Following defeat by the Petes, Cowan earned recognition for his debut season in earning selection to the Second All-Rookie Team.

In his first season of eligibility, Cowan was selected in the first round, 28th overall, by the Toronto Maple Leafs in the 2023 NHL entry draft. He was signed in the off-season to a three-year, entry-level contract by the Maple Leafs on August 10, 2023.

In the 2023–24 OHL season, Cowan scored a total 96 points in 54 games, including 68 points in 36 straight games to end the season, setting a Knights franchise record for the longest active point streak. This was also the longest point streak in the OHL since 1995. In recognition of his achievements, Cowan received the Red Tilson Trophy as the most valuable player (MVP) of the regular season and was named to the OHL First All-Star Team, and was subsequently voted onto the CHL First All-Star Team. He later led the league in playoff scoring with 34 points over 18 games, leading the Knights to a championship following a four-game sweep of the Oshawa Generals. He was additionally given the Wayne Gretzky 99 Award as playoff MVP. As OHL champions, the Knights played in the 2024 Memorial Cup, where they reached the championship game but were defeated 4–3 by the host Saginaw Spirit, in a rematch of the teams' semifinal series during the OHL playoffs. Cowan led the tournament in scoring with eight points, as a result winning the Ed Chynoweth Trophy.

On December 4th, 2024, Cowan tied the OHL point-streak with Doug Gilmour, by getting an assist on a goal by Sam O'Reilly in a 3–0 win against Owen Sound Attack. On December 6th, 2024, Cowan set the OHL point-streak record for 56 straight games by getting a goal in a 5–3 loss against the Oshawa Generals, where he was also injured. He was named an OHL Second Team All-Star. In the 2024–25 OHL playoffs, the Knights won a second consecutive Robertson Cup. Cowan led the postseason in points with 39 points (13 goals and 26 assists) in 17 games. Following their victory, the Knights competed at the 2025 Memorial Cup, where they reached the final again, and this time prevailed over the Medicine Hat Tigers to claim the title. Cowan tied teammate Denver Barkey for the tournament points lead, becoming the first player to lead the Memorial Cup in scoring in consecutive years since 1971/72. He was named to the Memorial Cup All-Star Team, and received the Stafford Smythe Memorial Trophy as the most valuable player of the Memorial Cup. Reflecting on his tenure in London, Cowan said: "Sucks it's my last game as a Knight, but I'm so glad I got to do it with these guys and win a championship."

== Personal life ==
Cowan grew up cheering for the Toronto Maple Leafs and was particularly fond of star winger Mitch Marner, while Nazem Kadri was his favourite player.

== Career statistics ==
Bold indicates led league

=== Regular season and playoffs ===
			Regular season					Playoffs
Season	Team	League	GP	G	A	Pts	PIM	GP	G	A	Pts	PIM
2021–22	Komoka Kings	GOJHL	24	11	23	34	30	—	—	—	—	—
2021–22	London Knights	OHL	7	1	1	2	2	5	0	2	2	0
2022–23	London Knights	OHL	68	20	33	53	47	20	9	12	21	16
2023–24	London Knights	OHL	54	34	62	96	64	18	10	**24**	**34**	18
2024–25	London Knights	OHL	46	29	40	69	41	17	13	26	**39**	16
2025–26	Toronto Maple Leafs	NHL	66	11	18	29	45	—	—	—	—	—
2025–26	Toronto Marlies	AHL	4	1	2	3	2	22	8	10	18	18
NHL totals			66	11	18	29	45	—	—	—	—	—

=== International ===
Year	Team	Event	Result	GP	G	A	Pts	PIM
2024	Canada	WJC	5th	5	1	1	2	2
2025	Canada	WJC	5th	5	1	2	3	4
Junior totals				10	2	3	5	6

== Awards and honours ==
Award	Year	Ref
CHL
First All-Star Team	2024	
Ed Chynoweth Trophy	2024, 2025	
Memorial Cup All-Star Team	2024, 2025	
Memorial Cup champion	2025	
Stafford Smythe Memorial Trophy	2025	
Third All-Star Team	2025	
OHL
Second All-Rookie Team	2023	
J. Ross Robertson Cup champion	2024, 2025	
Red Tilson Trophy	2024	
Wayne Gretzky 99 Award	2024	
First All-Star Team	2024	
Second All-Star Team	2025	
AHL
Calder Cup champion	2026	

Awards and achievements
Preceded by Rodion Amirov	Toronto Maple Leafs first-round draft pick 2023	Succeeded by Ben Danford
