= Wayne Gretzky 99 Award =

Most valuable player in the Ontario Hockey League playoffs

- Sport: Ice hockey
- Awarded for: MVP of OHL playoffs

History
- First award: 1999
- Most recent: Sam O'Reilly

The Wayne Gretzky 99 Award is awarded annually to the most valuable player in the Ontario Hockey League playoffs. It was first awarded in 1999, and is named for Wayne Gretzky. The recipient is selected by the news/sports media. The award was introduced shortly after Gretzky announced his retirement from the NHL in 1999. He played for the Sault Ste. Marie Greyhounds in the 1977–78 OHL season, scoring 70 goals as a rookie, establishing an OHL record for most goals by a 16-year-old that stood until 2007.

== Winners ==
List of winners of the Wayne Gretzky 99 Award.

Season	Winner	Team
1998–99	Justin Papineau	Belleville Bulls
1999–2000	Brian Finley	Barrie Colts
2000–01	Seamus Kotyk	Ottawa 67's
2001–02	Brad Boyes	Erie Otters
2002–03	Derek Roy	Kitchener Rangers
2003–04	Martin St. Pierre	Guelph Storm
2004–05	Corey Perry	London Knights
2005–06	Daniel Ryder	Peterborough Petes
2006–07	Marc Staal	Sudbury Wolves
2007–08	Justin Azevedo	Kitchener Rangers
2008–09	Taylor Hall	Windsor Spitfires
2009–10	Adam Henrique	Windsor Spitfires
2010–11	Rob Mignardi	Owen Sound Attack
2011–12	Austin Watson	London Knights
2012–13	Bo Horvat	London Knights
2013–14	Robby Fabbri	Guelph Storm
2014–15	Connor McDavid	Erie Otters
2015–16	Mitch Marner	London Knights
2016–17	Warren Foegele	Erie Otters
2017–18	Robert Thomas	Hamilton Bulldogs
2018–19	Nick Suzuki	Guelph Storm
2019–20	Playoffs cancelled due to the coronavirus pandemic – trophy not awarded	
2020–21	Season cancelled due to the coronavirus pandemic - trophy not awarded	
2021–22	Logan Morrison	Hamilton Bulldogs
2022–23	Michael Simpson	Peterborough Petes
2023–24	Easton Cowan	London Knights
2024–25	Kasper Halttunen	London Knights
2025–26	Sam O'Reilly	Kitchener Rangers

== See also ==
- List of Canadian Hockey League awards
