= Florian Xhekaj =

Canadian ice hockey player (born 2004)

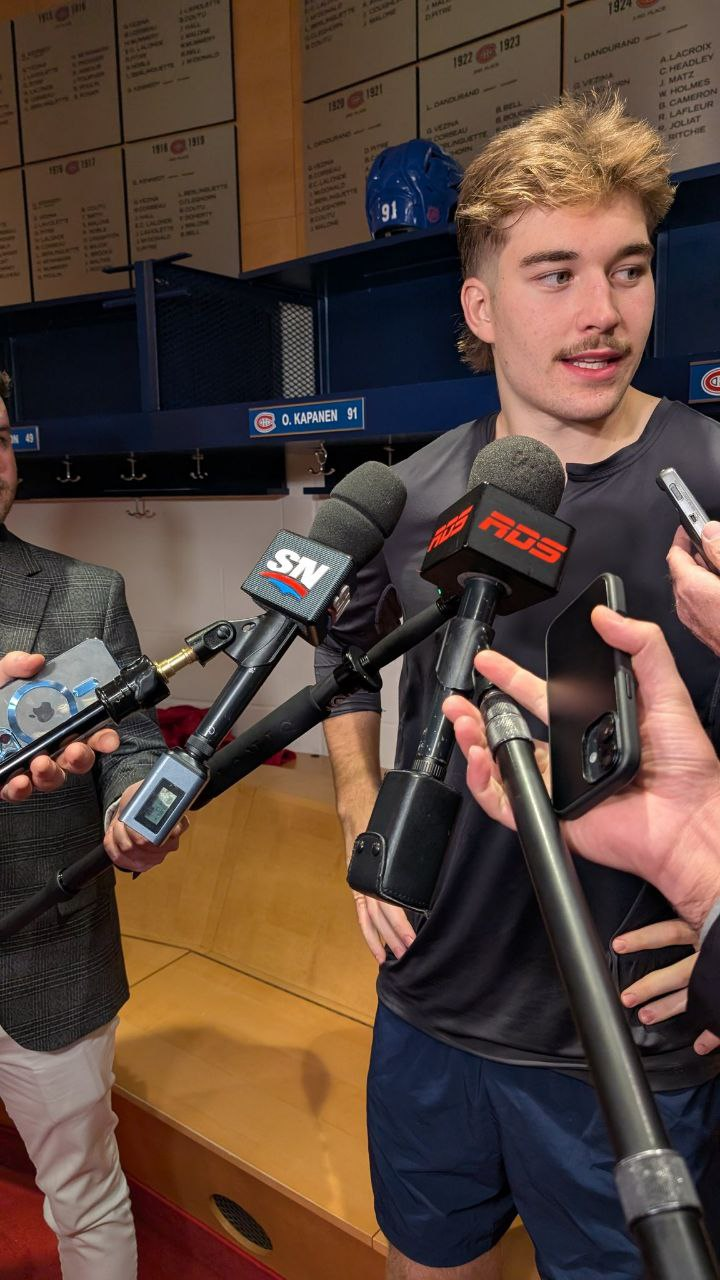
- Xhekaj in an interview in 2025
- Born: June 27, 2004 (age 22) Hamilton, Ontario, Canada
- Height: 6 ft 4 in (193 cm)
- Weight: 205 lb (93 kg; 14 st 9 lb)
- Position: Forward
- Shoots: Left
- NHL team: Montreal Canadiens
- NHL draft: 101st overall, 2023; Montreal Canadiens
- Playing career: 2024–present

Florian Xhekaj (pronounced /dʒækaɪ/, jak-EYE, born June 27, 2004) is a Canadian professional ice hockey player who is a forward for the Montreal Canadiens of the National Hockey League (NHL). He was selected in the fourth round, 101st overall, by the Canadiens in the 2023 NHL entry draft.

== Playing career ==
=== Junior ===
Initially being passed over in the annual Ontario Hockey League (OHL) Priority Selection draft, Xhekaj began his junior hockey career with the Pelham Panthers of the Greater Ontario Junior Hockey League (GOJHL). Collectively, Xhekaj appeared in 48 games with the Panthers, registering 17 goals and 23 assists and earned league All-Rookie team honours. Thereafter, he agreed to terms with the OHL's Hamilton Bulldogs as a free agent in July 2022.

Over the course of his rookie OHL campaign, Xhekaj provided both physical and scoring prowess, collecting 25 points and 76 penalty minutes in 68 games for the Bulldogs. Although eligible for NHL entry draft consideration in 2022, he would go overlooked until prior to his overage season in 2023, where he was selected in the fourth round (101st overall) by the Montreal Canadiens. In the ensuing 2023–24 season, Xhekaj experienced a breakout campaign, producing at over a point per game average and ultimately earned an entry-level contract with the Canadiens for his efforts.

=== Professional ===
After joining the team's American Hockey League (AHL) affiliate Laval Rocket under an amateur tryout (ATO) for the remainder of the 2023–24 season, Xhekaj returned to the AHL ranks the following season, where he finished first amongst Rocket rookies in scoring, including a franchise record for goals with 17.

With the Canadiens experiencing multiple personnel injuries in the early stages of the 2025–26 season, Xhekaj was recalled by Montreal on November 21, 2025. The following day, he made his NHL debut in a matchup against the Toronto Maple Leafs, recording his first career NHL point in a 5–2 win. During the early stages of the 2026–27 season, Xhekaj scored his first NHL goal on October 27, 2026, in a game versus the St. Louis Blues.

== Personal life ==
Xhekaj's father, Jack, is an Albanian from Drenas, Kosovo, who fled his country in the 1990s during the political unrest that preceded the Kosovo War. His mother, Simona, is from Hradec Králové, Czech Republic, and emigrated to Canada in 1996. The couple met two weeks after her arrival, at a hotel in Hamilton.

He is the younger brother of fellow Canadiens player Arber Xhekaj. On November 22, 2025, the siblings became the fourteenth pair in franchise history to play a regular-season NHL game together for Montreal, and the first since Andrei and Sergei Kostitsyn during the 2007–08 season.

== Career statistics ==
			Regular season					Playoffs
Season	Team	League	GP	G	A	Pts	PIM	GP	G	A	Pts	PIM
2021–22	Pelham Panthers	GOJHL	48	17	23	40	62	3	1	1	2	2
2022–23	Hamilton Bulldogs	OHL	68	13	12	25	76	6	1	2	3	18
2023–24	Brantford Bulldogs	OHL	63	34	31	65	81	6	3	2	5	9
2023–24	Laval Rocket	AHL	3	0	0	0	0	—	—	—	—	—
2024–25	Laval Rocket	AHL	69	24	11	35	175	13	1	2	3	59
2025–26	Laval Rocket	AHL	64	17	12	29	182	5	1	1	2	34
2025–26	Montreal Canadiens	NHL	5	0	1	1	7	—	—	—	—	—
NHL totals			5	0	1	1	7	—	—	—	—	—

== Awards and honours ==
Award	Year	Ref
GOJHL
All-Rookie Team	2022	
