= Quentin Musty =

American ice hockey player (born 2005)

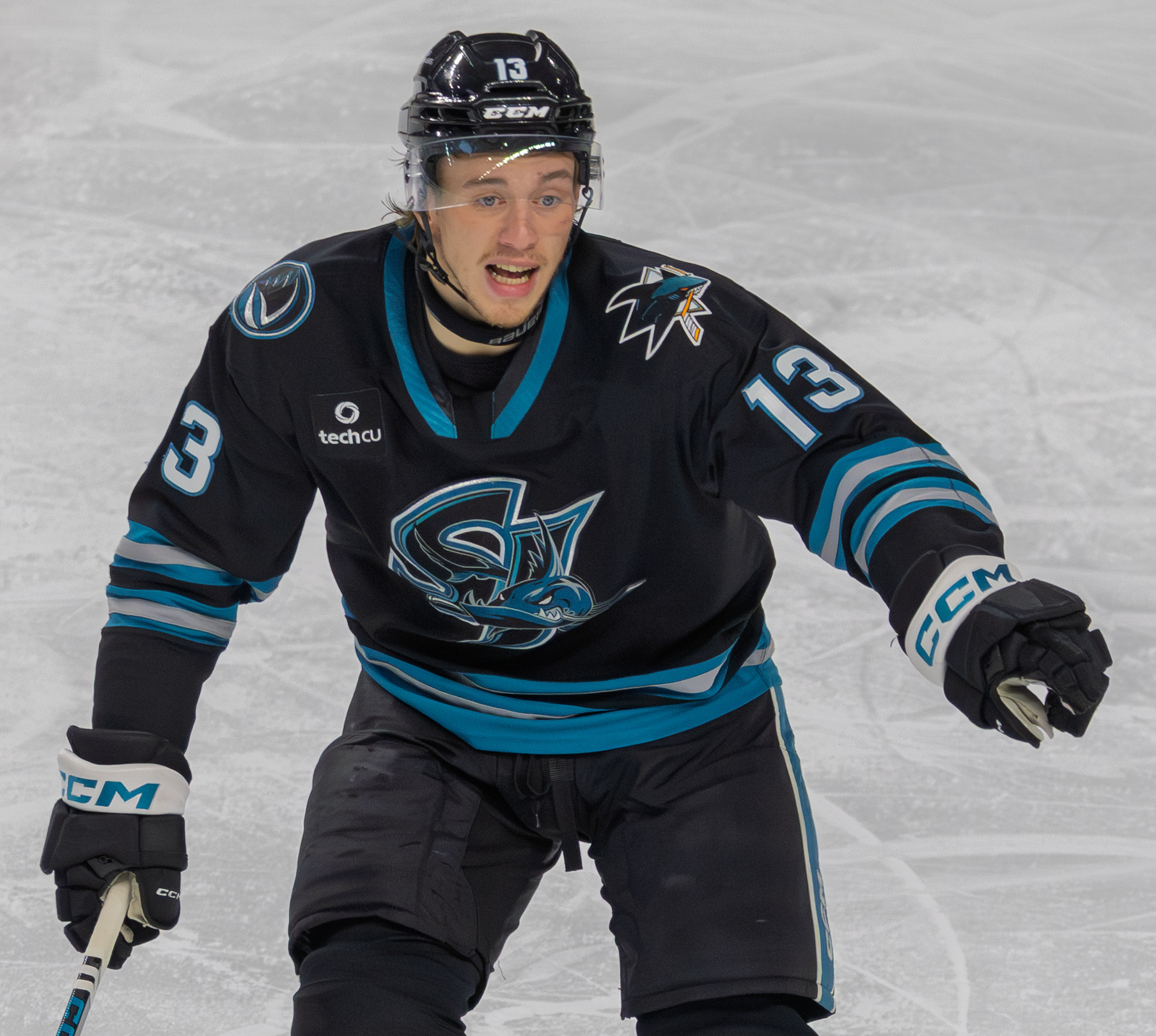
- Musty with the San Jose Barracuda in 2026
- Born: July 6, 2005 (age 21) Hamburg, New York, U.S.
- Height: 6 ft 2 in (188 cm)
- Weight: 205 lb (93 kg; 14 st 9 lb)
- Position: Left wing
- Shoots: Left
- NHL team (P) Cur. team: San Jose Sharks; San Jose Barracuda (AHL)
- NHL draft: 26th overall, 2023; San Jose Sharks
- Playing career: 2025–present

Quentin Musty (born July 6, 2005) is an American professional ice hockey player for the San Jose Barracuda of the American Hockey League (AHL) as a prospect to the San Jose Sharks of the National Hockey League (NHL).

== Playing career ==
Musty was taken first overall in the 2021 Ontario Hockey League (OHL) priority selection draft by the Sudbury Wolves, and made his debut in the 2021–22 season. He appeared in 50 games, recording 12 goals and 19 assists. He was named to the league's Second All-Rookie Team.

Injuries limited Musty to 53 games in the 2022–23 season, but he averaged 1.46 points per game, with 26 goals and 52 assists. He registered seven points in a single game against the Niagara IceDogs in December, tying a franchise record. Musty was drafted by the San Jose Sharks 26th overall in the first round of the 2023 NHL entry draft. He was signed by the Sharks to a three-year, entry-level contract on October 4, 2023.

Musty enjoyed great success in the 2023–24 season, aided by the arrival early on of St. Louis Blues prospect Dalibor Dvorský from the Swedish Hockey League. On November 24, he scored his first OHL hat trick in a 9–2 victory over the London Knights, and also had two assists in the same game. In late March he hit the 100-point threshold for the first time. He finished the regular season with 102 points in 53 games played. Musty was named to the OHL's First All-Star Team, alongside Dvorský. They became the first pair of Wolves to earn that distinction since the 1999–2000 season. The postseason ended in disappointment, as the Wolves were swept in the second round by the North Bay Battalion.

The Sharks returned Musty to the Wolves for the 2024–25 season. However, Musty did not immediately join the club as he had requested a trade from the Wolves. The team issued an official statement regarding the situation, saying that they would consider a trade if it helped the team but would also welcome Musty back if he decided to rejoin them. Musty returned to the Wolves' lineup on November 1, having missed the first 12 games of the season.

== Career statistics ==
=== Regular season and playoffs ===
			Regular season					Playoffs
Season	Team	League	GP	G	A	Pts	PIM	GP	G	A	Pts	PIM
2021–22	Sudbury Wolves	OHL	50	12	19	31	70	—	—	—	—	—
2022–23	Sudbury Wolves	OHL	53	26	52	78	71	4	1	3	4	6
2023–24	Sudbury Wolves	OHL	53	43	59	102	72	8	2	8	10	2
2024–25	Sudbury Wolves	OHL	33	30	29	59	14	3	1	3	4	0
2024–25	San Jose Barracuda	AHL	3	0	0	0	4	1	0	0	0	0
2025–26	San Jose Barracuda	AHL	61	21	24	45	46	2	0	0	0	0
AHL totals			64	21	24	45	50	3	0	0	0	0

=== International ===
Year	Team	Event	Result	GP	G	A	Pts	PIM
2022	United States	HG18	5th	4	1	4	5	4
Junior totals				4	1	4	5	4

== Awards and honours ==
Award	Year	Ref
OHL
Jack Ferguson Award	2021	
Second All-Rookie Team	2022	
First All-Star Team	2024	

Awards and achievements
Preceded by Will Smith	San Jose Sharks first-round draft pick 2023	Succeeded by Macklin Celebrini
