= Tim Adams Memorial Trophy =

- Sport: Ice hockey
- Awarded for: MVP of the OHL Cup

History
- First award: 2003
- Most recent: Austin Hall

The Tim Adams Memorial Trophy is presented annually by the Ontario Hockey League (OHL) to the minor ice hockey player selected as the most valuable player of the OHL Cup. Tim Adams was a graduate of the Greater Toronto Hockey League and a long time coach of both the Toronto Marlboros and Toronto Young Nationals. Tim Adams died at an early age from cancer.

== Winners ==
- List of winners of the Tim Adams Memorial Trophy.

Season	Winner	Team
2003	Jhase Sniderman	Toronto Young Nats
2004	Harrison Reed	York Simcoe Express
2005	Sam Gagner	Toronto Marlies
2006	Steven Stamkos	Markham Waxers
2007	Casey Cizikas	Mississauga IceDogs
2008	John McFarland	Toronto Jr. Canadiens
2009	Lucas Lessio	Toronto Marlboros
2010	Sean Monahan	Mississauga Rebels
2011	Aaron Berisha	Toronto Marlboros
2012	Connor McDavid	Toronto Marlboros
2013	Adam Craievich	Oakville Rangers
2014	Michael McLeod	Toronto Marlboros
2015	Ryan McLeod	Toronto Marlboros
2016	Andrei Berezinskiy	York-Simcoe Express
2017	Mike Petizian	Mississauga Reps
2018	Dylan Robinson	Toronto Jr. Canadiens
2019	Shane Wright	Don Mills Flyers
2020	Not awarded, OHL Cup cancelled due to COVID-19 pandemic	
2021	Not awarded, OHL Cup cancelled due to COVID-19 pandemic	
2022	Michael Misa	Mississauga Senators
2023	Jake O'Brien	Toronto Jr. Canadiens
2024	Ethan Belchetz	Oakville Rangers
2025	Camryn Warren	Toronto Jr. Canadiens
2026	Austin Hall	Detroit HoneyBaked

== See also ==
- List of Canadian Hockey League awards
