= OHL Cup =

Canadian minor hockey tournament

- Sport: Ice hockey

History
- Most wins: Toronto Young Nats (7)
- Most recent: Toronto Jr Canadiens (4)

The Ontario Hockey League Showcase Cup (more commonly known as the OHL Cup) is a tournament hosted by the Ontario Hockey League (OHL) and operated by the Greater Toronto Hockey League (GTHL) with the purpose of providing an additional scouting opportunity to minor midget players in Ontario, and other districts which fall under the Ontario Hockey League's draft region. It originally started as a Bantam tournament, however when age groups in Canada were realigned to match USA and International age classification the tournament was changed to a Minor Midget tournament.

The OHL Cup Showcase Tournament features the top minor midget teams from Ontario, along with selected teams from the U.S.A. Invitations for the tournament will be extended to the champion and finalist from each division of the Ontario Hockey Federation and branches of the OHF, ODHA and Thunder Bay. All T.B.A. teams will be selected by the Tournament Selection Committee. In the event that a league/association champion or finalist does not take advantage of their qualification, the vacancy will similarly be determined by the Tournament Selection Committee. This year (2011)the Toronto Marlboros won the tournament led by Cody Thompson who was the leader in point for forwards and Chance Macdonald who was the leader in points for defenceman.

== Registration ==
Registration to the OHL Cup is by both qualification and invitation. Each season, the number of automatic berths for each region in Ontario are set by the OHL with additional Ontario berths selected by a selection committee that monitors the progress and performance of teams during the season and publishes weekly ranking of the top ten teams. All US-based teams are also selected by committee.

== Rules ==
Although the tournament bears the Ontario Hockey League name the tournament is played using Hockey Canada rules.

== Champions ==
List of champions and finalists:

| Season | Champions | Finalists |
|---|---|---|
| 1967–68 | Toronto Young Nats | Hamilton |
| 1968–69 | Sarnia | Elliot Lake |
| 1969–70 | Toronto Young Nats | Sudbury |
| 1970–71 | Toronto Marlboros | North Bay |
| 1971–72 | Toronto Marlboros | Sault Ste Marie |
| 1972–73 | Sudbury | Toronto Marlboros |
| 1973–74 | Don Mills Flyers | Sudbury |
| 1974–75 | Toronto Young Nats | Sudbury |
| 1975–76 | Burlington | Toronto Marlboros |
| 1976–77 | Mississauga | Oakville |
| 1977–78 | Oshawa | Sault Ste. Marie |
| 1978–79 | St. Michael's | St. Catharines |
| 1979–80 | Toronto Young Nats | Brantford |
| 1980–81 | Don Mills Flyers | Brantford |
| 1981–82 | Toronto Young Nats | North Bay |
| 1982–83 | Toronto Red Wings | Toronto Young Nats |
| 1983–84 | Mississauga Reps | Kitchener Jr Rangers |
| 1984–85 | Toronto Marlboros | Sault Ste. Marie |
| 1985–86 | Sault Ste. Marie | Chinguacousy |
| 1986–87 | Toronto Red Wings | Sault Ste. Marie |
| 1987–88 | Wexford Raiders | Sault Ste. Marie |
| 1988–89 | Gloucester Rangers | Don Mills Don Mills |
| 1989–90 | Toronto Red Wings | Gloucester Rangers |
| 1990–91 | Gloucester Rangers | Ottawa Valley Titans |
| 1991–92 | Mississauga Blackhawks | Thunder Bay Kings |
| 1992–93 | Mississauga Senators | Don Mills Flyers |
| 1993–94 | Richmond Hill-Vaughan | Ottawa Valley Titans |
| 1994–95 | Thunder Bay Kings | Cumberland Barons |
| 1995–96 | Toronto Young Nats | Thunder Bay Kings |
| 1996–97 | Thunder Bay Kings | Ottawa Valley Titans |
| 1997–98 | Peterborough Petes | Mississauga |
| 1998–99 | Thunder Bay Kings | Richmond Hill Stars |
| 1999–00 | Thunder Bay Kings | Mississauga Reps |
| 2000–01 | Peterborough Petes | Hamilton Reps |
| 2001–02 | Toronto Red Wings | Oakville Rangers |
| 2002–03 | Toronto Young Nats | Sun County Panthers |
| 2003–04 | York Simcoe Express | Richmond Hill Stars |
| 2004–05 | Toronto Marlboros | London Jr. Knights |
| 2005–06 | Markham Waxers | Toronto Red Wings |
| 2006–07 | Mississauga IceDogs | Toronto Marlboros |
| 2007–08 | Toronto Jr Canadiens | Toronto Marlboros |
| 2008–09 | Toronto Marlboros | Elgin-Middlesex Chiefs |
| 2009–10 | Mississauga Rebels | Toronto Marlboros |
| 2010–11 | Toronto Marlboros | Don Mills Flyers |
| 2011–12 | Mississauga Rebels | Toronto Marlboros |
| 2012–13 | Oakville Rangers | Toronto Marlboros |
| 2013–14 | Toronto Marlboros | Toronto Jr Canadiens |
| 2014–15 | Toronto Marlboros | Don Mills Flyers |
| 2015–16 | York Simcoe Express | Toronto Marlboros |
| 2016–17 | Mississauga Reps | Toronto Young Nats |
| 2017–18 | Toronto Jr Canadiens | Vaughan Kings |
| 2018–19 | Don Mills Flyers | Toronto Red Wings |
| 2019–20 | Not awarded, OHL Cup cancelled due to COVID-19 pandemic | |
| 2020–21 | Not awarded, OHL Cup cancelled due to COVID-19 pandemic | |
| 2021–22 | Mississauga Senators | Toronto Jr Canadiens |
| 2022–23 | Toronto Jr Canadiens | Vaughan Kings |
| 2023–24 | Oakville Rangers | Vaughan Kings |
| 2024–25 | Toronto Jr Canadiens | Don Mills Flyers |
| 2025-26 | Detroit Honeybaked | Toronto Jr Canadiens |

== Awards ==
- Tim Adams Memorial Trophy - Most Valuable player
