= 2022–23 OHL season =

- League: Ontario Hockey League
- Sport: Hockey
- Duration: Preseason; September 2, 2022 - September 25, 2022; Regular season September 29, 2022 – March 26, 2023; Playoffs; March 30, 2023 – May 21, 2023
- Teams: 20
- TV partner(s): Rogers TV; Shaw TV; YourTV; TSN; CBC

Draft
- Top draft pick: Michael Misa
- Picked by: Saginaw Spirit

Regular season
- Hamilton Spectator Trophy: Ottawa 67's (6)
- Season MVP: Matthew Maggio (Windsor Spitfires)
- Top scorer: Matthew Maggio (Windsor Spitfires)

Playoffs
- Playoffs MVP: Michael Simpson (Petes)
- Finals champions: Peterborough Petes (10)
- Runners-up: London Knights

OHL seasons
- 2021–22 2023–24

2022–23 CHL season
- League: Canadian Hockey League
- Sport: Hockey
- Duration: OHL; September 2022 – May 2023; QMJHL; September 2022 – May 2023; WHL; September 2022 – May 2023
- Teams: 60
- TV partner(s): RDS; TSN; CBC; Rogers TV; Shaw TV
- Season MVP: Connor Bedard (Regina Pats) (WHL)
- Top scorer: Connor Bedard (Regina Pats) (WHL)

Memorial Cup
- Finals champions: Quebec Remparts (QMJHL) (3rd title)
- Runners-up: Seattle Thunderbirds (WHL)

The 2022–23 OHL season was the 43rd season of operation (42nd season of play) of the Ontario Hockey League. The league played a 68-game regular season which began on September 29, 2022 and concluded on March 26, 2023. The post-season began on March 30, 2023 and concluded on May 21, 2023.

The Peterborough Petes won the J. Ross Robertson Cup and represented the Ontario Hockey League at the 2023 Memorial Cup, which was hosted by the Kamloops Blazers of the Western Hockey League. Games were played at the Sandman Centre in Kamloops, British Columbia.

== Preseason ==
On July 12, 2022, the OHL announced the preseason schedule for the 2022–23 season. In total, there will be 51 preseason games beginning on September 2 and concluding on September 25. All OHL teams will play between three and six preseason games.

On September 10, the Ottawa 67's played the Gatineau Olympiques of the QMJHL at Centre Slush Puppie in Gatineau, Quebec in the only interleague preseason game. The Olympiques defeated the 67's by a score of 6-1 in front of 2,688 fans.

Neutral site games will be played in Ancaster, Ayr, Clarington, Clinton, Cobourg, Cornwall, Kanata, Midland, Millbrook, Norwood, Pembroke, Port Colborne, Virgil, and Whitby.

OHL training camps began in late August in preparation of the 2022-23 season, which began on September 29, 2022.

== Regular season ==
=== Relocation ===
On February 7, 2023, the Hamilton Bulldogs announced that the club would be moving to Brantford, Ontario for three seasons due to renovations and the long-term closure of First Ontario Centre beginning in the 2023–24 season. The team also announced that the team would be known as the Brantford Bulldogs and play at the Brantford Civic Centre.

=== Final standings ===
Note: DIV = Division; GP = Games played; W = Wins; L = Losses; OTL = Overtime losses; SL = Shootout losses; GF = Goals for; GA = Goals against;
PTS = Points; x = clinched playoff berth; y = clinched division title; z = clinched conference title
Standings as of March 26, 2023

==== Eastern conference ====
Rank	Team	DIV	GP	W	L	OTL	SOL	Pts	ROW	GF	GA
1	z-Ottawa 67's	East	68	51	12	3	2	107	47	286	171
2	y-North Bay Battalion	Central	68	48	17	2	1	99	46	285	183
3	x-Barrie Colts	Central	68	42	17	6	3	93	41	284	239
4	x-Peterborough Petes	East	68	35	29	2	2	74	33	247	207
5	x-Sudbury Wolves	Central	68	31	28	6	3	71	31	272	260
6	x-Hamilton Bulldogs	East	68	33	30	5	0	71	30	226	251
7	x-Mississauga Steelheads	Central	68	31	31	6	0	68	28	226	258
8	x-Oshawa Generals	East	68	26	36	1	5	58	24	235	290
9	Kingston Frontenacs	East	68	27	38	1	2	57	23	199	260
10	Niagara IceDogs	Central	68	12	47	8	1	33	12	199	357

==== Western conference ====
Rank	Team	DIV	GP	W	L	OTL	SOL	Pts	ROW	GF	GA
1	z-Windsor Spitfires	West	68	44	18	4	2	94	44	320	265
2	y-London Knights	Midwest	68	45	21	2	0	92	38	269	214
3	x-Sarnia Sting	West	68	41	18	5	4	91	39	298	224
4	x-Saginaw Spirit	West	68	36	27	3	2	77	36	244	244
5	x-Flint Firebirds	West	68	35	28	4	1	75	33	291	278
6	x-Guelph Storm	Midwest	68	35	28	4	1	75	29	253	280
7	x-Owen Sound Attack	Midwest	68	33	28	6	1	73	32	248	258
8	x-Kitchener Rangers	Midwest	68	33	29	6	0	72	33	257	240
9	Sault Ste. Marie Greyhounds	West	68	20	33	9	6	55	17	223	310
10	Erie Otters	Midwest	68	21	40	2	5	49	20	207	287

=== Scoring leaders ===
Note: GP = Games played; G = Goals; A = Assists; Pts = Points; PIM = Penalty minutes

Player	Team	GP	G	A	Pts	PIM
Matthew Maggio	Windsor Spitfires	66	54	57	111	32
Ty Voit	Sarnia Sting	67	24	81	105	22
Amadeus Lombardi	Flint Firebirds	67	45	57	102	18
Sasha Pastujov	Guelph/Sarnia	60	41	57	98	39
Evan Vierling	Barrie Colts	60	35	60	95	12
Matt Poitras	Guelph Storm	63	16	79	95	40
Logan Morrison	Hamilton/Ottawa	56	40	54	94	12
Matvey Petrov	North Bay Battalion	65	27	66	93	32
David Goyette	Sudbury Wolves	63	41	51	92	43
Francesco Arcuri	Kingston/Kitchener	71	48	43	91	28

=== Leading goaltenders ===
Note: GP = Games played; Mins = Minutes played; W = Wins; L = Losses: OTL = Overtime losses;
SL = Shootout losses; GA = Goals Allowed; SO = Shutouts; GAA = Goals against average

Player	Team	GP	MINS	W	L	OTL	SOL	GA	SO	Sv%	GAA
Dom Divincentiis	North Bay Battalion	48	2810	36	9	2	0	109	5	0.919	2.33
Max Donoso	Ottawa 67's	47	2541	30	10	0	2	115	2	0.898	2.72
Michael Simpson	Peterborough Petes	51	2989	24	22	2	2	136	5	0.914	2.73
Brett Brochu	London Knights	47	2725	28	17	2	0	124	2	0.902	2.82
Joey Costanzo	Windsor Spitfires	40	2158	26	6	0	2	109	1	0.901	3.03

== Attendance ==
Team	Arena	Home Games	Average Attendance	Capacity Percentage
London Knights	Budweiser Gardens	34	8,995	99.5%
Kitchener Rangers	Kitchener Memorial Auditorium	34	6,261	87.8%
Oshawa Generals	Tribute Communities Centre	34	5,037	97.2%
Windsor Spitfires	WFCU Centre	34	4,844	75.1%
Guelph Storm	Sleeman Centre	34	4,458	94.5%
Ottawa 67's	TD Place Arena	34	4,282	65.9%
Niagara IceDogs	Meridian Centre	34	4,065	77.0%
Hamilton Bulldogs	FirstOntario Centre	34	3,760	21.6%
Erie Otters	Erie Insurance Arena	34	3,616	53.8%
Saginaw Spirit	Dow Event Center	34	3,531	63.9%
Sault Ste. Marie Greyhounds	GFL Memorial Gardens	34	3,513	71.3%
Sarnia Sting	Progressive Auto Sales Arena	34	3,385	82.2%
Barrie Colts	Sadlon Arena	34	3,376	80.5%
Sudbury Wolves	Sudbury Community Arena	34	3,297	71.1%
Peterborough Petes	Peterborough Memorial Centre	34	3,222	86.4%
Kingston Frontenacs	Leon's Centre	34	3,190	56.8%
Flint Firebirds	Dort Financial Center	34	2,976	68.2%
Owen Sound Attack	Bayshore Community Centre	34	2,759	78.8%
North Bay Battalion	North Bay Memorial Gardens	34	2,588	60.7%
Mississauga Steelheads	Paramount Fine Foods Centre	34	2,038	37.6%

=== J. Ross Robertson Cup Champions Roster ===
2022-23 Peterborough Petes
Goaltenders: (Canada) 1 – Liam Sztuska; (Canada) 31 – Michael Simpson	Defencemen: (Canada) 2 – Samuel Mayer; (Canada) 3 – Cam Gauvreau; (Canada) 6 – Konnor Smith; (Canada) 7 – Shawn Spearing - C; (Canada) 8 – Gavin White; (Switzerland) 9 – Brian Zanetti; (Canada) 19 – Donovan McCoy	Wingers: (Canada) 10 – J.R. Avon; (Canada) 12 – Sam McCue; (Canada) 14 – Quinton Page; (Canada) 17 – Zack Lewis; (Canada) 18 – Connor Lockhart; (Italy) 20 – Tommy Purdeller; (Canada) 23 – Jonathan Melee; (United States) 29 – Avery Hayes; (Canada) 61 – Chase Stillman; (Canada) 78 – Brennan Othmann	Centres: (Canada) 15 – Braydon McCallum; (Canada) 16 – Owen Beck; (Canada) 22 – Tucker Robertson; (Canada) 25 – Chase Lefebvre; (Canada) 26 – Jax Dubois; Coach: (Canada) Rob Wilson; General Manager: (Canada) Mike Oke

== Playoffs ==
Conference quarterfinals	Conference semifinals
1	Ottawa	4
8	Oshawa	1
1	Ottawa	2
4	Peterborough	4
4	Peterborough	4
5	Sudbury	0
Eastern Conference
2	North Bay	4
7	Mississauga	2
2	North Bay	4
3	Barrie	3
3	Barrie	4
6	Hamilton	2
1	Windsor	0
8	Kitchener	4
8	Kitchener	1
2	London	4
2	London	4
7	Owen Sound	0
Western Conference
3	Sarnia	4
6	Guelph	2
3	Sarnia	4
4	Saginaw	0
4	Saginaw	4
5	Flint	3

Conference finals
4	Peterborough	4
2	North Bay	3
2	London	4
3	Sarnia	2

Finals
E4	Peterborough	4
W2	London	2

=== Conference quarterfinals ===
==== Eastern conference quarterfinals ====
===== (1) Ottawa 67's vs. (8) Oshawa Generals =====
Note: Ottawa played home games at Centre Slush Puppie in Gatineau, Quebec due to the 2023 World Men's Curling Championship being held at TD Place Arena.

March 30	Oshawa Generals	0 – 7	Ottawa 67's	Centre Slush Puppie	Recap
No scoring		First period	12:01 - Luca Pinelli (1); 16:19 - pp - Luca Pinelli (2)
No scoring		Second period	13:28 - Frankie Marrelli (1); 17:39 - pp - Brady Stonehouse (1)
No scoring		Third period	3:34 - Jack Matier (1); 14:56 - pp - Frankie Marrelli (2); 17:50 - pp - Jack Matier (2)
Jacob Oster (49 saves / 56 shots)		Goalie stats	Collin MacKenzie (16 saves / 16 shots)

April 2	Oshawa Generals	2 – 3	Ottawa 67's	Centre Slush Puppie	Recap
No scoring		First period	No scoring
Beckett Sennecke (1) - 14:04		Second period	4:56 - Logan Morrison (1); 7:27 - Will Gerrior (1)
Calum Ritchie (1) - pp - 10:44		Third period	5:06 - Logan Morrison (2)
Jacob Oster (30 saves / 33 shots)		Goalie stats	Collin MacKenzie (29 saves / 31 shots)

April 4	Ottawa 67's	4 – 5	OT	Oshawa Generals	Tribute Communities Centre	Recap
Cooper Foster (1) - 15:59; Jack Beck (1) - 19:24		First period		1:19 - Cameron Butler (2)
Will Gerrior (2) - pp - 9:26		Second period		No scoring
Jack Beck (2) - 19:54		Third period		9:54 - Cameron Butler (3); 15:12 - Matthew Buckley (1); 17:44 - pp - Ryan Gagnier (1)
No scoring		First overtime period		0:23 - Ryan Gagnier (2)
Collin MacKenzie (23 saves / 28 shots)		Goalie stats		Jacob Oster (31 saves / 35 shots)

April 6	Ottawa 67's	9 – 0	Oshawa Generals	Tribute Communities Centre	Recap
Luca Pinelli (3) - 5:06; Vinzenz Rohrer (1) - pp - 8:51		First period	No scoring
Will Gerrior (3) - 2:31; Logan Morrison (3) - 8:03; Luca Pinelli (4) - 9:16; Will Gerrior (4) - 9:53; Logan Morrison (4) - 12:03; Jack Beck (3) - 18:02		Second period	No scoring
Logan Morrison (5) - 17:20		Third period	No scoring
Max Donoso (29 saves / 29 shots)		Goalie stats	Jacob Oster (20 saves / 26 shots); Carter Bickle (6 saves / 9 shots)

April 8	Oshawa Generals	2 – 4	Ottawa 67's	Centre Slush Puppie	Recap
Calum Ritchie (2) - pp - 6:01		First period	10:00 - pp - Logan Morrison (6)
Ryan Gagnier (3) - 12:04		Second period	6:09 - Logan Morrison (7)
No scoring		Third period	14:11 - Luca Pinelli (5); 19:53 - en - Brady Stonehouse (2)
Jacob Oster (28 saves / 31 shots)		Goalie stats	Max Donoso (33 saves / 35 shots)

Ottawa wins series 4 – 1

===== (2) North Bay Battalion vs. (7) Mississauga Steelheads =====
March 31	Mississauga Steelheads	1 – 5	North Bay Battalion	North Bay Memorial Gardens	Recap
No scoring		First period	7:30 - Ty Nelson (1)
No scoring		Second period	2:20 - Dalyn Wakely (1); 8:03 - Anthony Romani (1); 11:25 - Anthony Romani (2); 18:36 - Josh Bloom (1)
James Hardie (1) - pp - 14:19		Third period	No scoring
Ryerson Leenders (23 saves / 28 shots)		Goalie stats	Dom DiVincentiis (36 saves / 37 shots)

April 2	Mississauga Steelheads	4 – 3	North Bay Battalion	North Bay Memorial Gardens	Recap
James Hardie (2) - pp - 15:37		First period	No scoring
Angus MacDonnell (1) - 3:42		Second period	2:07 - Nikita Tarasevich (1); 4:14 - Kyle McDonald (1); 5:57 - Pasquale Zito (1)
James Hardie (3) - 3:50; Charlie Callaghan (1) - pp - 9:50		Third period	No scoring
Ryerson Leenders (23 saves / 26 shots)		Goalie stats	Dom DiVincentiis (40 saves / 44 shots)

April 4	North Bay Battalion	5 – 2	Mississauga Steelheads	Paramount Fine Foods Centre	Recap
Dalyn Wakely (2) - 14:04		First period	17:31 - pp - Kasper Larsen (1)
Kyle McDonald (2) - pp - 3:04; Liam Arnsby (1) - 16:16		Second period	18:41 - Zander Veccia (1)
Ethan Procyszyn (1) - 12:54; Kyle McDonald (3) - en - 16:57		Third period	No scoring
Dom DiVincentiis (33 saves / 35 shots)		Goalie stats	Ryerson Leenders (21 saves / 25 shots)

April 5	North Bay Battalion	1 – 4	Mississauga Steelheads	Paramount Fine Foods Centre	Recap
No scoring		First period	No scoring
Anthony Romani (3) - pp - 15:10		Second period	13:57 - sh - Angus MacDonell (2)
No scoring		Third period	4:36 - Angus MacDonell (3); 17:06 - James Hardie (4); 19:51 - en - Zander Veccia (2)
Dom DiVincentiis (28 saves / 31 shots)		Goalie stats	Ryerson Leenders (22 saves / 23 shots)

April 7	Mississauga Steelheads	0 – 6	North Bay Battalion	North Bay Memorial Gardens	Recap
No scoring		First period	1:28 - pp - Kyle Jackson (1)
No scoring		Second period	6:06 - Kyle McDonald (4); 13:40 - Justin Ertel (1); 17:16 - Kyle Jackson (2)
No scoring		Third period	2:02 - Josh Bloom (2); 13:29 - pp - Ty Nelson (2)
Ryerson Leenders (23 saves / 27 shots); Alessio Beglieri (9 saves / 11 shots)		Goalie stats	Dom DiVincentiis (37 saves / 37 shots)

April 9	North Bay Battalion	5 – 4	Mississauga Steelheads	Paramount Fine Foods Centre	Recap
Kyle McDonald (5) - 9:10; Kyle Jackson (3) - 11:45; Dalyn Wakely (3) - 13:36; Kyle McDonald (6) - pp - 17:07		First period	15:05 - sh - Kai Schwindt (1)
Kyle McDonald (7) - 11:49		Second period	18:40 - Porter Martone (1); 19:35 - James Hardie (5)
No scoring		Third period	17:13 - Porter Martone (2)
Dom Divencentiis (36 saves / 40 shots)		Goalie stats	Ryerson Leenders (24 saves / 29 shots)

North Bay wins series 4 – 2

===== (3) Barrie Colts vs. (6) Hamilton Bulldogs =====
March 30	Hamilton Bulldogs	2 – 10	Barrie Colts	Sadlon Arena	Recap
Noah Nelson (1) - 8:13		First period	6:40 - sh - Declan McDonnell (1); 12:13 - Beau Jelsma (1); 18:42 - Tai York (1)
Lucas Moore (1) - pp - 5:34		Second period	1:09 - pp - Brandt Clarke (1); 4:54 - sh - Beau Jelsma (2); 7:22 - Tai York (2); 15:11 - Jacob Frasca (1); 18:57 - pp - Tyler Savard (1)
No scoring		Third period	5:45 - pp - Declan McDonnell (2); 14:29 - pp - Brandt Clarke (2)
Tristan Malboeuf (13 saves / 17 shots); Matteo Drobac (21 saves / 27 shots)		Goalie stats	Anson Thornton (22 saves / 24 shots)

April 1	Hamilton Bulldogs	3 – 6	Barrie Colts	Sadlon Arena	Recap
No scoring		First period	10:21 - pp - Callum Chisholm (1); 12:20 - pp - Declan McDonnell (3)
Noah Van Vliet (1) - 19:00		Second period	10:21 - Brandt Clarke (3); 11:06 - Ethan Cardwell (1)
Nick Lardis (1) - 8:28; Adrian Rebelo (1) - sh - 14:53		Third period	2:35 - Braden Haché (1); 7:40 - Ethan Cardwell (2)
Tristan Malboeuf (30 saves / 36 shots)		Goalie stats	Anson Thornton (26 saves / 29 shots)

April 2	Barrie Colts	3 – 6	Hamilton Bulldogs	FirstOntario Centre	Recap
Callum Chisholm (2) - 14:11; Jacob Frasca (2) - 15:19		First period	6:56 - Artem Grushnikov (1); 16:17 - Adrian Rebelo (2)
Callum Chisholm (3) - 13:22		Second period	10:57 - Lawson Sherk (1); 11:15 - Cole Brown (1)
No scoring		Third period	18:32 - en - Artem Grushnikov (2); 19:53 - en - Artem Grushnikov (3)
Anson Thornton (22 saves / 26 shots)		Goalie stats	Matteo Drobac (27 saves / 30 shots)

April 4	Barrie Colts	3 – 5	Hamilton Bulldogs	FirstOntario Centre	Recap
Declan McDonnell (4) - 6:22		First period	5:13 - pp - Cole Brown (2)
No scoring		Second period	1:58 - pp - Jorian Donovan (1); 8:10 - Adrian Rebelo (3)
Ethan Cardwell (3) - pp - 0:58; Braden Haché (2) - pp - 10:12		Third period	3:10 - pp - Nick Lardis (2); 15:55 - pp - Nick Lardis (3)
Ben West (29 saves / 34 shots)		Goalie stats	Matteo Drobac (28 saves / 31 shots)

April 6	Hamilton Bulldogs	1 – 4	Barrie Colts	Sadlon Arena	Recap
Nick Lardis (4) - pp - 5:07		First period	7:52 - pp - Jacob Frasca (3); 9:21 - pp - Evan Vierling (1)
No scoring		Second period	No scoring
No scoring		Third period	18:32 - en - Brandt Clarke (4); 19:29 - en - Anson Thornton (1)
Matteo Drobac (21 saves / 23 shots)		Goalie stats	Anson Thornton (23 saves / 24 shots)

April 10	Barrie Colts	5 – 4	Hamilton Bulldogs	FirstOntario Centre	Recap
No scoring		First period	3:13 - Sahil Panwar (1); 6:39 - pp - Lucas Moore (2)
Brandt Clarke (5) - pp - 13:40; Beau Akey (1) - 17:13; Ethan Cardwell (4) - 18:34		Second period	4:33 - Florian Xhekaj (1)
Ethan Cardwell (5) - 13:42; Ethan Cardwell (6) - 19:50		Third period	16:47 - Nick Lardis (5)
Anson Thornton (16 saves / 20 shots)		Goalie stats	Matteo Drobac (32 saves / 37 shots)

Barrie wins series 4 – 2

===== (4) Peterborough Petes vs. (5) Sudbury Wolves =====
March 30	Sudbury Wolves	2 – 4	Peterborough Petes	Peterborough Memorial Centre	Recap
Quentin Musty (1) - 11:24		First period	19:56 - sh - Jonathan Melee (1)
Matthew Mania (1) - 4:55		Second period	16:53 - en - Jonathan Melee (2)
No scoring		Third period	5:32 - pp - Avery Hayes (1); 17:47 - en - Avery Hayes (2)
Kevyn Brassard (34 saves / 36 shots)		Goalie stats	Michael Simpson (26 saves / 28 shots)

March 31	Sudbury Wolves	1 – 2	Peterborough Petes	Peterborough Memorial Centre	Recap
Evan Konyen (1) - pp - 9:53		First period	No scoring
No scoring		Second period	6:03 - pp - Tucker Robertson (1)
No scoring		Third period	0:14 - Brennan Othmann (1)
Kevyn Brassard (51 saves / 53 shots)		Goalie stats	Michael Simpson (40 saves / 41 shots)

April 4	Peterborough Petes	5 – 3	Sudbury Wolves	Sudbury Community Arena	Recap
Avery Hayes (3) - ps - 7:27		First period	2:44 - David Goyette (1); 16:49 - Kocha Delic (1)
J.R. Avon (1) - sh - 9:30; Connor Lockhart (1) - pp - 11:53		Second period	No scoring
Owen Beck (1) - 6:02; Avery Hayes (4) - en - 18:03		Third period	19:36 - Marc Boudreau (1)
Michael Simpson (19 saves / 22 shots)		Goalie stats	Kevyn Brassard (28 saves / 32 shots)

April 5	Peterborough Petes	4 – 2	Sudbury Wolves	Sudbury Community Arena	Recap
Owen Beck (2) - pp - 4:45		First period	5:48 - sh - Landon McCallum (1)
Tom Purdeller (1) - pp - 5:59; J.R Avon (2) - 12:03; Tucker Robertson (2) - 13:50		Second period	8:21 - pp - Landon McCallum (2)
No scoring		Third period	No scoring
Michael Simpson (27 saves / 29 shots)		Goalie stats	Kevyn Brassard (14 saves / 18 shots); Nate Krawchuk (15 saves / 15 shots)

Peterborough wins series 4 – 0

==== Western conference quarterfinals ====
===== (1) Windsor Spitfires vs. (8) Kitchener Rangers =====
March 30	Kitchener Rangers	5 – 3	Windsor Spitfires	WFCU Centre	Recap
Reid Valade (1) - 0:40; Adrian Misaljevic (1) - 9:02		First period	14:22 - Brett Harrison (1)
Francesco Pinelli (1) - sh - 8:11; Trent Swick (1) - 11:29		Second period	10:12 - Shane Wright (1)
Reid Valade (2) - en - 18:56		Third period	19:37 - Anthony Cristoforo (1)
Marco Costantini (29 saves / 32 shots)		Goalie stats	Joey Costanzo (34 saves / 38 shots)

April 1	Kitchener Rangers	4 – 0	Windsor Spitfires	WFCU Centre	Recap
Francesco Pinelli (2) - sh - 8:42; Ty Hollett (1) - 12:33		First period	No scoring
Matthew Sop (1) - sh - 0:55; Matthew Sop (2) - pp - 17:43		Second period	No scoring
No scoring		Third period	No scoring
Marco Costantini (31 saves / 31 shots)		Goalie stats	Joey Costanzo (15 saves / 19 shots); Mathias Onuska (7 saves / 7 shots)

April 4	Windsor Spitfires	3 – 6	Kitchener Rangers	Kitchener Memorial Auditorium	Recap
No scoring		First period	19:06 - Carson Rehkopf (1)
No scoring		Second period	No scoring
Alex Christopoulos (1) - 3:42; Rodwin Dionicio (1) - 10:17; Matthew Maggio (1) - pp - 17:44		Third period	8:07 - Adrian Misaljevic (2); 12:40 - Mitchell Martin (1); 13:19 - pp - Francesco Arcuri (1); 19:37 - en - Simon Motew (1); 19:47 - en - Reid Valade (3)
Mathias Onuska (24 saves / 28 shots)		Goalie stats	Marco Costantini (40 saves / 43 shots)

April 6	Windsor Spitfires	1 – 5	Kitchener Rangers	Kitchener Memorial Auditorium	Recap
No scoring		First period	No scoring
Jacob Maillet (1) - 0:55		Second period	6:21 - pp - Carson Rehkopf (2); 13:56 - Danny Zhilkin (1); 19:31 - Filip Mešár (1)
No scoring		Third period	6:53 - Mitchell Martin (2); 19:01 - en - Reid Valade (4)
Mathias Onuska (31 saves / 35 shots)		Goalie stats	Marco Costantini (30 saves / 31 shots)

Kitchener wins series 4 – 0

===== (2) London Knights vs. (7) Owen Sound Attack =====
March 31	Owen Sound Attack	0 – 7	London Knights	Budweiser Gardens	Recap
No scoring		First period	5:15 - Jacob Julien (1)
No scoring		Second period	5:34 - Max McCue (1); 9:08 - ps - Max McCue (2); 14:21 - Sean McGurn (1)
No scoring		Third period	6:51 - Sean McGurn (2); 9:46 -pp - Max McCue (3); 17:27 - Ryan Humphrey (1)
Corbin Votary (35 saves / 42 shots)		Goalie stats	Brett Brochu (25 saves / 25 shots)

April 2	Owen Sound Attack	4 – 5	OT	London Knights	Budweiser Gardens	Recap
Colby Barlow (1) - pp - 11:11		First period		16:44 - Brody Crane (1)
No scoring		Second period		7:05 - pp - Easton Cowan (1); 11:42 - pp - Ryan Winterton (1)
Sam Sedley (1) - 4:34; Colby Barlow (2) - pp - 18:35; Cedrick Guindon (1) - 19:07		Third period		9:27 - Ethan MacKinnon (1)
No scoring		First overtime period		15:47 - George Diaco (1)
Corbin Votary (48 saves / 53 shots)		Goalie stats		Brett Brochu (24 saves / 28 shots)

April 4	London Knights	3 – 2	OT	Owen Sound Attack	Bayshore Community Centre	Recap
Denver Barkey (1) - 18:23		First period		15:37 - pp - Cedrick Guindon (2)
Denver Barkey (2) - pp - 0:57		Second period		16:14 - pp - Servac Petrovsky (1)
No scoring		Third period		No scoring
Ryan Humphrey (2) - 13:18		First overtime period		No scoring
Brett Brochu (34 saves / 36 shots)		Goalie stats		Corbin Votary (32 saves / 35 shots)

April 6	London Knights	5 – 0	Owen Sound Attack	Bayshore Community Centre	Recap
Ryan Winterton (2) - pp - 13:21; Connor Federkow (1) - 19:45		First period	No scoring
No scoring		Second period	No scoring
Logan Mailloux (1) - 1:58; Ryan Winterton (3) - pp - 3:34; Logan Mailloux (2) - pp - 11:36		Third period	No scoring
Brett Brochu (23 saves / 23 shots)		Goalie stats	Corbin Votary (9 saves / 11 shots); Nick Chenard (22 saves / 25 shots)

London wins series 4 – 0

===== (3) Sarnia Sting vs. (6) Guelph Storm =====
March 31	Guelph Storm	0 – 5	Sarnia Sting	Progressive Auto Sales Arena	Recap
No scoring		First period	5:37 - Nolan Dillingham (1)
No scoring		Second period	6:31 - Nolan Burke (1); 8:08 - Marcus Limpar-Lantz (1)
No scoring		Third period	0:57 - pp - Luca Del Bel Belluz (1); 18:27 - pp - Sandis Vilmanis (1)
Patrick Leaver (32 saves / 37 shots)		Goalie stats	Benjamin Gaudreau (22 saves / 22 shots)

April 2	Guelph Storm	4 – 5	OT	Sarnia Sting	Progressive Auto Sales Arena	Recap
Max Namestnikov (1) - 11:45; Ben McFarlane (1) - 15:08		First period		4:34 - pp - Luca Del Bel Belluz (2); 14:26 - Luca Del Bel Bulluz (3)
Cooper Walker (1) - pp - 16:20		Second period		12:15 - Zach Filak (1)
Jake Karabela (1) - 2:17		Third period		18:02 - Marko Sikic (1)
No scoring		First overtime period		10:30 - Nolan Burke (2)
Brayden Gillespie (30 saves / 35 shots)		Goalie stats		Benjamin Gaudreau (31 saves / 35 shots)

April 4	Sarnia Sting	8 – 4	Guelph Storm	Sleeman Centre	Recap
Sandis Vilmanis (2) - 14:41		First period	2:43 - Isaac Enright (1); 8:44 - Ben McFarlane (2)
Sasha Pastujov (1) - 1:27; Mitch Young (1) - 2:19; Nolan Burke (3) - 9:04; Easton Wainwright (1) - 9:11; Sandis Vilmanis (3) - 11:21		Second period	No scoring
Brenden Anderson (1) - 12:44; Christian Kyrou (1) - en - 16:18		Third period	0:59 - sh - Jake Karabela (2); 5:01 - Matt Poitras (1)
Benjamin Gaudreau (27 saves / 31 shots)		Goalie stats	Brayden Gillespie (13 saves / 18 shots); Patrick Leaver (11 saves / 13 shots)

April 6	Sarnia Sting	4 – 5	Guelph Storm	Sleeman Centre	Recap
Easton Wainwright (2) - 8:10		First period	1:44 - Valentin Zhugin (1); 7:31 - Max Namestnikov (2)
No scoring		Second period	5:39 - Valentin Zhugin (2); 17:56 - Charlie Paquette (1)
Brenden Anderson (2) - 3:43; Cooper Way (1) - 6:11; Tyson Doucette (1)		Third period	18:57 - en - Cooper Walker (2)
Benjamin Gaudreau (10 saves / 14 shots); Nicholas Surzycia (3 saves / 3 shots)		Goalie stats	Patrick Leaver (24 saves / 28 shots)

April 7	Guelph Storm	3 – 1	Sarnia Sting	Progressive Auto Sales Arena	Recap
No scoring		First period	No scoring
Jake Karabela (3) - 4:29; Max Namestnikov (3) - 18:14		Second period	9:51 - Zach Filak (1)
Jake Murray (1) - en - 19:00		Third period	No scoring
Patrick Leaver (32 saves / 33 shots)		Goalie stats	Benjamin Gaudreau (14 saves / 16 shots)

April 9	Sarnia Sting	4 – 3	OT	Guelph Storm	Sleeman Centre	Recap
No scoring		First period		15:51 - Matt Poitras (2)
Sasha Pastujov (2) - 7:36; Ty Voit (1) - 14:56		Second period		9:30 - pp - Max Namestnikov (4)
Sasha Pastujov (3) - 7:19		Third period		4:48 - Charlie Paquette (2)
Nolan Burke (4) - 4:06		First overtime period		No scoring
Benjamin Gaudreau (16 saves / 19 shots)		Goalie stats		Patrick Leaver (28 saves / 32 shots)

Sarnia wins series 4 – 2

===== (4) Saginaw Spirit vs. (5) Flint Firebirds =====
March 30	Flint Firebirds	1 – 7	Saginaw Spirit	Dow Event Center	Recap
Riley Piercey (1) - 1:01		First period	3:30 - pp - Mitchell Smith (1); 9:32 - pp - Joey Willis (1)
No scoring		Second period	2:59 - Zayne Parekh (1); 5:58 - Zayne Parekh (2); 9:29 - sh - Hunter Haight (1); 12:56 - Michael Misa (1)
No scoring		Third period	13:29 - Joey Willis (2)
Nathaniel Day (6 saves / 10 shots); Will Cranley (7 saves / 10 shots)		Goalie stats	Tristan Lennox (34 saves / 35 shots)

March 31	Flint Firebirds	1 – 4	Saginaw Spirit	Dow Event Center	Recap
Nolan Dann (1) - 8:24		First period	12:15 - Matyáš Šapovaliv (1); 18:52 - pp - Matyáš Šapovaliv (2)
No scoring		Second period	No scoring
No scoring		Third period	12:41 - Hunter Haight (2); 19:37 - en - Matyáš Šapovaliv (3)
Nathaniel Day (22 saves / 25 shots)		Goalie stats	Tristan Lennox (16 saves / 17 shots)

April 3	Saginaw Spirit	4 – 5	OT	Flint Firebirds	Dort Financial Center	Recap
Zayne Parekh (3) - 16:43		First period		15:07 - Zacharie Giroux (1)
Michael Misa (2) - 10:44		Second period		18:11 - pp - Tristan Bertucci (1)
Matyáš Šapovaliv (4) - 15:41; Matyáš Šapovaliv (5) - 19:02		Third period		8:09 - Marko Stojkov (1); 14:52 - Amadeus Lombardi (1)
No scoring		First overtime period		12:41 - pp - Nolan Dann (2)
Tristan Lennox (38 saves / 43 shots)		Goalie stats		Nathaniel Day (33 saves / 37 shots)

April 5	Saginaw Spirit	2 – 1	OT	Flint Firebirds	Dort Financial Center	Recap
No scoring		First period		No scoring
Roberto Mancini (1) - 13:42		Second period		6:53 - Amadeus Lombardi (2)
No scoring		Third period		No scoring
Mitchell Smith (2) - 5:57		First overtime period		No scoring
Tristan Lennox (28 saves / 29 shots)		Goalie stats		Nathaniel Day (34 saves / 36 shots)

April 7	Flint Firebirds	5 – 2	Saginaw Spirit	Dow Event Center	Recap
Amadeus Lombardi (3) - 14:03		First period	No scoring
Zacharie Giroux (2) - pp - 1:13		Second period	16:17 - pp - Mitchell Smith (3)
Dmitry Kuzmin (1) - 3:46; Ethan Hay (1) - 8:42; Tyler Deline (1) - en - 17:17		Third period	3:46 - Dean Loukus (1)
Nathaniel Day (38 saves / 40 shots)		Goalie stats	Tristan Lennox (19 saves / 23 shots)

April 8	Saginaw Spirit	3 – 4	OT	Flint Firebirds	Dort Financial Center	Recap
No scoring		First period		No scoring
Joey Willis (3) - 3:50; Zayne Parekh (4) - 13:43; Hunter Haight (3) - 16:59		Second period		5:27 - Nolan Dann (3)
No scoring		Third period		10:19 - Nolan Dann (4); 14:10 - Zacharie Giroux (3)
No scoring		First overtime period		4:53 - Coulson Pitre (1)
Tristan Lennox (27 saves / 31 shots)		Goalie stats		Nathaniel Day (32 saves / 35 shots)

April 10	Flint Firebirds	3 – 6	Saginaw Spirit	Dow Event Center	Recap
Amadeus Lombardi (4) - 3:17		First period	10:51 - Joey Willis (4); 12:23 - Michael Misa (3)
No scoring		Second period	11:25 - Matyáš Šapovaliv (6)
Coulson Pitre (2) - 4:45; Amadeus Lombardi (5) - 6:43		Third period	16:12 - Matyáš Šapovaliv (7); 18:46 - en - Mitchell Smith (4); 19:21 - en - Dean Loukus (2)
Nathaniel Day (24 saves / 28 shots)		Goalie stats	Tristan Lennox (20 saves / 23 shots)

Saginaw wins series 4 – 3

=== Conference semifinals ===
==== Eastern conference semifinals ====
===== (1) Ottawa 67's vs. (4) Peterborough Petes =====
April 14	Peterborough Petes	2 – 4	Ottawa 67's	TD Place Arena	Recap
Tucker Robertson (3) - 19:33		First period	6:01 - Jack Beck (4)
J.R. Avon (3) - 20:00		Second period	6:00 - Henry Mews (1)
No scoring		Third period	12:28 - Jack Beck (5); 19:34 - en - Logan Morrison (8)
Michael Simpson (32 saves / 35 shots)		Goalie stats	Max Donoso (22 saves / 24 shots)

April 16	Peterborough Petes	2 – 1	Ottawa 67's	TD Place Arena	Recap
Brennan Othmann (2) - 7:23		First period	No scoring
Gavin White (1) - 0:30		Second period	No scoring
No scoring		Third period	18:33 - Jack Matier (3)
Michael Simpson (25 saves / 26 shots)		Goalie stats	Max Donoso (27 saves / 29 shots)

April 18	Ottawa 67's	2 – 3	Peterborough Petes	Peterborough Memorial Centre	Recap
Cameron Tolnai (1) - 18:11		First period	No scoring
Cooper Foster (2) - 10:34		Second period	10:24 - Avery Hayes (5); 10:58 - Jax Dubois (1)
No scoring		Third period	18:45 - Brennan Othmann (3)
Max Donoso (33 saves / 36 shots)		Goalie stats	Michael Simpson (26 saves / 28 shots)

April 20	Ottawa 67's	1 – 3	Peterborough Petes	Peterborough Memorial Centre	Recap
No scoring		First period	No scoring
Luca Pinelli (6) - pp - 19:00		Second period	1:14 - Brennan Othmann (4); 7:34 - Chase Stillman (1)
No scoring		Third period	19:32 - en - Owen Beck (3)
Max Donoso (34 saves / 36 shots)		Goalie stats	Michael Simpson (19 saves / 20 shots)

April 22	Peterborough Petes	4 – 5	Ottawa 67's	TD Place Arena	Recap
Tucker Robertson (4) - 6:36; Connor Lockhart (2) - 9:42		First period	18:37 - Logan Morrison (9)
Jonathan Melee (3) - 9:46; Brian Zanetti (1) - 13:35		Second period	No scoring
No scoring		Third period	3:33 - Frankie Marrelli (3); 6:03 - Brad Gardiner (1); 9:45 - Logan Morrison (10); 17:52 - Frankie Marrelli (4)
Michael Simpson (27 saves / 32 shots)		Goalie stats	Max Donoso (20 saves / 24 shots)

April 24	Ottawa 67's	4 – 5	Peterborough Petes	Peterborough Memorial Centre	Recap
Gavin Ewles (1) - 17:17		First period	10:11 - Connor Lockhart (3); 12:17 - Avery Hayes (6)
No scoring		Second period	4:31 - Connor Lockhart (4); 5:02 - Jonathan Melee (4)
Derek Smyth (1) - 12:59; Vinzenz Rohrer (2) - 16:09; Luca Pinelli (7) - 17:54		Third period	1:05 - Connor Lockhart (5)
Max Donoso (19 saves / 23 shots); Collin MacKenzie (18 saves / 19 shots)		Goalie stats	Michael Simpson (35 saves / 39 shots)

Peterborough wins series 4 – 2

===== (2) North Bay Battalion vs. (3) Barrie Colts =====
April 14	Barrie Colts	3 – 2	OT	North Bay Battalion	North Bay Memorial Gardens	Recap
No scoring		First period		14:02 - pp - Ty Nelson (3)
Zach Wigle (1) - 11:47		Second period		4:40 - Owen Van Steensel (1)
Brandt Clarke (6) - 2:55		Third period		No scoring
Josh Kavanagh (1) - 1:49		First overtime period		No scoring
Anson Thornton (39 saves / 41 shots)		Goalie stats		Dom DiVincentiis (27 saves / 30 shots)

April 16	Barrie Colts	2 – 5	North Bay Battalion	North Bay Memorial Gardens	Recap
Beau Jelsma (2) - pp - 0:43		First period	1:29 - Kyle McDonald (8); 8:07 - Kyle McDonald (9); 16:38 - Kyle Jackson (4)
No scoring		Second period	4:39 - Liam Arnsby (2)
Jacob Frasca (4) - pp - 9:25		Third period	19:19 - en - Pasquale Zito (2)
Anson Thornton (23 saves / 27 shots)		Goalie stats	Dom DiVincentiis (32 saves / 34 shots)

April 18	North Bay Battalion	1 – 2	OT	Barrie Colts	Sadlon Arena	Recap
No scoring		First period		No scoring
Ty Nelson (4) - 5:09		Second period		11:53 - Tai York (3)
No scoring		Third period		No scoring
No scoring		First overtime period		3:03 - Jacob Frasca (5)
Dom DiVincentiis (33 saves / 35 shots)		Goalie stats		Anson Thornton (17 saves / 18 shots)

April 20	North Bay Battalion	4 – 3	2OT	Barrie Colts	Sadlon Arena	Recap
Liam Arnsby (3) - 18:39		First period		2:45 - pp - Beau Akey (2); 10:18 - Cooper Matthews (1)
No scoring		Second period		8:54 - Tyler Savard (2)
Kyle McDonald (10) - pp - 7:07; Matvey Petrov (1) - 9:50		Third period		No scoring
Anthony Romani (4) - 2:43		Second overtime period		No scoring
Dom DiVincentiis (27 saves / 30 shots)		Goalie stats		Anson Thornton (52 saves / 56 shots)

April 22	Barrie Colts	3 – 7	North Bay Battalion	North Bay Memorial Gardens	Recap
Tai York (4) - 8:41		First period	12:34 - pp - Matvey Petrov (2)
Jacob Frasca (6) - pp - 0:37		Second period	6:49 - Luc Brzustowski (1); 7:54 - Pasquale Zito (3); 8:15 - Avery Winslow (1)
Brandt Clarke (7) - 4:55		Third period	11:24 - Pasquale Zito (4); 12:11 - Dalyn Wakely (4); 13:12 - pp - Kyle McDonald (11)
Anson Thornton (23 saves / 30 shots)		Goalie stats	Dom DiVincentiis (20 saves / 23 shots)

April 24	North Bay Battalion	2 – 4	Barrie Colts	Sadlon Arena	Recap
Dalyn Wakely (5) - pp - 7:09		First period	18:14 - Declan MacDonell (5)
No scoring		Second period	5:59 - pp - Tyler Savard (3)
Pasquale Zito (5) - pp - 1:47		Third period	17:56 - Tyler Savard (4); 19:14 - Beau Jelsma (4)
Dom DiVincentiis (27 saves / 31 shots)		Goalie stats	Anson Thornton (32 saves/ 34 shots)

April 25	Barrie Colts	1 – 3	North Bay Battalion	North Bay Memorial Gardens	Recap
Beau Jelsma (5) - 15:50		First period	No scoring
No scoring		Second period	No scoring
No scoring		Third period	4:26 - pp - Kyle Jackson (5); 6:25 - pp - Kyle McDonald (12); 19:13 - en - Owen Van Steensel (2)
Anson Thornton (21 saves / 23 shots)		Goalie stats	Dom DiVincentiis (28 saves / 29 shots)

North Bay wins series 4 – 3

==== Western conference semifinals ====
===== (2) London Knights vs. (8) Kitchener Rangers =====
April 13	Kitchener Rangers	1 – 5	London Knights	Budweiser Gardens	Recap
No scoring		First period	19:15 - pp - Denver Barkey (3)
No scoring		Second period	3:05 - pp - Sean McGurn (4); 6:38 - Ryan Humphrey (3)
Francesco Arcuri (2) - pp - 15:16		Third period	7:51 - Ryan Humphrey (4); 17:19 - pp - George Diaco (2)
Marco Costantini (27 saves / 32 shots)		Goalie stats	Brett Brochu (22 saves / 23 shots)

April 14	Kitchener Rangers	4 – 8	London Knights	Budweiser Gardens	Recap
No scoring		First period	0:49 - Logan Mailloux (3); 3:57 - pp - Sam Dickinson (1); 10:07 - pp - Ryan Winterton (4)
Reid Valade (5) - pp - 18:58		Second period	0:37 - Easton Cowan (2); 9:43 - Connor Federkow (2); 13:45 - Brody Crane (2)
Mitchell Martin (3) - 1:29; Francesco Arcuri (3) - 15:45; Francesco Arcuri (4) - pp - 17:50		Third period	11:17 - Sean McGurn (5); 19:45 - Ruslan Gazizov (1)
Marco Costantini (14 saves / 19 shots); Marcus Vandenberg (22 saves / 25 shots)		Goalie stats	Brett Brochu (25 saves / 29 shots)

April 16	London Knights	1 – 6	Kitchener Rangers	Kitchener Memorial Auditorium	Recap
No scoring		First period	19:52 - sh - Francesco Pinelli (3)
Ryan Humphrey (5) - 12:06		Second period	5:44 - pp - Roman Schmidt (1)
No scoring		Third period	4:10 - Francesco Pinelli (4); 4:39 - Francesco Arcuri (5); 13:06 - Mitchell Martin (4); 19:17 - Ty Hollett (2)
Brett Brochu (20 saves / 24 shots); Zach Bowen (11 saves / 13 shots)		Goalie stats	Marco Costantini (30 saves / 31 shots)

April 18	London Knights	5 – 0	Kitchener Rangers	Kitchener Memorial Auditorium	Recap
Denver Barkey (4) - pp - 13:28; George Diaco (3) - 19:41		First period	No scoring
Sean McGurn (6) - pp - 6:24; Ryan Humphrey (6) - 19:46		Second period	No scoring
Connor Federkow (3) - 9:22		Third period	No scoring
Brett Brochu (25 saves / 25 shots)		Goalie stats	Marco Costantini (26 saves / 31 shots)

April 20	Kitchener Rangers	0 – 4	London Knights	Budweiser Gardens	Recap
No scoring		First period	No scoring
No scoring		Second period	4:19 - Max McCue (3); 6:07 - Denver Barkey (5); 15:07 - sh - Denver Barkey (6)
No scoring		Third period	17:30 - en - Logan Mailloux (4)
Marco Costantini (23 saves / 26 shots)		Goalie stats	Brett Brochu (16 saves / 16 shots)

London wins series 4 – 1

===== (3) Sarnia Sting vs. (4) Saginaw Spirit =====
April 14	Saginaw Spirit	0 – 3	Sarnia Sting	Progressive Auto Sales Arena	Recap
No scoring		First period	17:21 - Easton Wainwright (3)
No scoring		Second period	No scoring
No scoring		Third period	1:28 - Zach Filak (3); 17:02 - en - Sasha Pastujov (4)
Tristan Lennox (21 saves /23 shots)		Goalie stats	Benjamin Gaudreau (26 saves / 26 shots)

April 16	Saginaw Spirit	1 – 2	OT	Sarnia Sting	Progressive Auto Sales Arena	Recap
No scoring		First period		8:14 - pp - Ty Voit (2)
No scoring		Second period		No scoring
Matyas Sapovaliv (8) - 19:20		Third period		No scoring
No scoring		First overtime period		8:37 - pp - Luca Del Bel Belluz (4)
Tristan Lennox (45 saves / 47 shots)		Goalie stats		Benjamin Gaudreau (33 saves / 34 shots)

April 18	Sarnia Sting	5 – 3	Saginaw Spirit	Dow Event Center	Recap
Nolan Burke (5) - 4:20		First period	9:23 - Sebastien Gervais (1)
No scoring		Second period	No scoring
Luca Del Bel Belluz (5) - 7:11; Sandis Vilmanis (4) - 13:09; Ethan Ritchie (1) - en - 17:00; Nolan Dillingham (2) - en - 18:32		Third period	11:08 - pp - Zayne Parekh (5); 18:10 - Zayne Parekh (6)
Benjamin Gaudreau (30 saves / 33 shots)		Goalie stats	Tristan Lennox (19 saves / 22 shots)

April 20	Sarnia Sting	4 – 0	Saginaw Spirit	Dow Event Center	Recap
Luca Del Bel Belluz (6) - pp - 6:30; Easton Wainwright (4) - 18:58		First period	No scoring
Marcus Limpar-Lantz (2) - sh - 4:38		Second period	No scoring
Easton Wainwright (5) - 8:57		Third period	No scoring
Benjamin Gaudreau (25 saves / 25 shots)		Goalie stats	Tristan Lennox (24 saves / 28 shots)

Sarnia wins series 4 – 0

=== Conference finals ===
==== Eastern conference finals ====
===== (2) North Bay Battalion vs. (4) Peterborough Petes =====
April 28	Peterborough Petes	3 – 2	North Bay Battalion	North Bay Memorial Gardens	Recap
Jonathan Melee (5) - 1:28; Owen Beck (4) - 5:13; Connor Lockhart (6) - 18:16		First period	No scoring
No scoring		Second period	17:16 - Anthony Romani (5)
No scoring		Third period	1:11 - Pasquale Zito (6)
Michael Simpson (37 saves / 39 shots)		Goalie stats	Dom DiVincentiis (20 saves / 23 shots)

April 30	Peterborough Petes	1 – 3	North Bay Battalion	North Bay Memorial Gardens	Recap
No scoring		First period	No scoring
Brennan Othmann (5) - 15:22		Second period	8:18 - Kyle Jackson (6)
No scoring		Third period	15:08 - Liam Arnsby (4); 19:15 - en - Owen Van Steensel (3)
Michael Simpson (31 saves / 33 shots)		Goalie stats	Dom DiVincentiis (26 saves / 27 shots)

May 2	North Bay Battalion	2 – 3	Peterborough Petes	Peterborough Memorial Centre	Recap
No scoring		First period	14:03 - pp - Brennan Othmann (6)
Pasquale Zito (7) - sh - 14:43; Matvey Petrov (3) - 18:58		Second period	No scoring
No scoring		Third period	6:55 - Avery Hayes (7); 17:55 - Samuel Mayer (1)
Dom DiVincentiis (40 saves / 43 shots)		Goalie stats	Michael Simpson (32 saves / 34 shots)

May 3	North Bay Battalion	5 – 2	Peterborough Petes	Peterborough Memorial Centre	Recap
Owen Van Steensel (4) - 1:23; Kyle Jackson (7) - 7:37		First period	10:33 - Tommy Purdeller (2)
Ty Nelson (5) - 7:44; Owen Van Steensel (5) - sh - 19:00		Second period	14:29 - J.R. Avon (4)
Liam Arnsby (5) - en - 19:14		Third period	No scoring
Dom DiVincentiis (37 saves / 39 shots)		Goalie stats	Michael Simpson (21 saves / 25 shots)

May 5	Peterborough Petes	2 – 6	North Bay Battalion	North Bay Memorial Gardens	Recap
Owen Beck (5) - pp - 12:51		First period	1:29 - Josh Bloom (3); 6:17 - Owen Van Steensel (6); 9:18 - Liam Arnsby (6)
Tucker Robertson (5) - 14:16		Second period	2:57 - Kyle McDonald (13); 6:15 - pp - Kyle McDonald (14); 10:12 - pp - Ty Nelson (6)
No scoring		Third period	No scoring
Michael Simpson (29 saves / 35 shots); Liam Sztuska (17 saves / 17 shots)		Goalie stats	Dom DiVincentiis (22 saves / 24 shots)

May 7	North Bay Battalion	3 – 4	OT	Peterborough Petes	Peterborough Memorial Centre	Recap
No scoring		First period		6:08 - J.R. Avon (5); 7:11 - Chase Stillman (2)
Josh Bloom (4) - sh - 12:16; Anthony Romani (6) - 19:13		Second period		No scoring
Matvey Petrov (4) - 9:18		Third period		10:46 - Samuel Mayer (2)
No scoring		First overtime period		2:40 - Avery Hayes (8)
Dom DiVincentiis (40 saves / 44 shots)		Goalie stats		Michael Simpson (26 saves / 29 shots)

May 8	Peterborough Petes	3 – 2	North Bay Battalion	North Bay Memorial Gardens	Recap
No scoring		First period	10:56 - Josh Bloom (5)
Owen Beck (6) - 1:24; Brennan Othmann (7) - 6:55		Second period	12:49 - Liam Arnsby (7)
J.R. Avon (6) - 5:42		Third period	No scoring
Michael Simpson (22 saves / 24 shots)		Goalie stats	Dom DiVincentiis (24 saves / 27 shots)

Peterborough wins series 4 – 3

==== Western conference finals ====
===== (2) London Knights vs. (3) Sarnia Sting =====
April 28	Sarnia Sting	1 – 4	London Knights	Budweiser Gardens	Recap
Luca Del Bel Belluz (7) - pp - 19:38		First period	No scoring
No scoring		Second period	7:25 - Sean McGurn (7); 9:45 - pp - Sam Dickinson (2)
No scoring		Third period	4:15 - Easton Cowan (3); 19:14 - en - Ryan Winterton (5)
Benjamin Gaudreau (21 saves / 24 shots)		Goalie stats	Brett Brochu (32 saves / 33 shots)

April 30	Sarnia Sting	1 – 3	London Knights	Budweiser Gardens	Recap
No scoring		First period	No scoring
No scoring		Second period	No scoring
Ethan Ritchie (2) - 12:34		Third period	2:21 - Easton Cowan (4); 16:28 - pp - Logan Mailloux (5); 19:28 - en - Ryan Winterton (6)
Benjamin Gaudreau (25 saves / 27 shots)		Goalie stats	Brett Brochu (18 saves / 18 shots); Zach Bowen (8 saves / 9 shots)

May 2	London Knights	3 – 5	Sarnia Sting	Progressive Auto Sales Arena	Recap
No scoring		First period	0:27 - Luca Del Bel Belluz (8); 14:05 - pp - Nolan Burke (6)
George Diaco (4) - pp - 9:15		Second period	4:45 - Sasha Pastujov (5)
Brody Crane (3) - 7:05; Ryan Winterton (7) - 16:07		Third period	5:39 - Marcus Limpar-Lantz (3); 12:34 - Ethan Ritchie (3)
Zach Bowen (25 saves / 30 shots)		Goalie stats	Benjamin Gaudreau (25 saves / 28 shots)

May 3	London Knights	3 – 6	Sarnia Sting	Progressive Auto Sales Arena	Recap
George Diaco (5) - 15:48; Ryan Winterton (8) - pp - 17:40		First period	3:19 - Brenden Anderson (3); 10:05 - pp - Ty Voit (3)
Denver Barkey (7) - 10:57		Second period	12:37 - pp - Nolan Burke (7); 14:39 - Marcus Limpar-Lantz (4); 18:29 - Easton Wainwright (6)
No scoring		Third period	14:55 - en - Nolan Burke (8)
Zach Bowen (22 saves / 27 shots)		Goalie stats	Benjamin Gaudreau (23 saves / 26 shots)

May 5	Sarnia Sting	2 – 5	London Knights	Budweiser Gardens	Recap
No scoring		First period	6:06 - Ruslan Gazizov (2)
No scoring		Second period	No scoring
Nolan Dillingham (3) - 0:40; Sasha Pastujov (6) - pp - 18:55		Third period	0:53 - Denver Barkey (8); 1:32 - Ryan Winterton (9); 17:30 - en - Easton Cowan (5); 19:16 - en - Ryan Winterton (10)
Benjamin Gaudreau (22 saves / 25 shots)		Goalie stats	Zach Bowen (30 saves / 32 shots)

May 7	London Knights	5 – 1	Sarnia Sting	Progressive Auto Sales Arena	Recap
Denver Barkey (9) - 19:59		First period	12:08 - Marcus Limpar-Lantz (5)
Easton Cowan (6) - 2:30; Logan Mailloux (6) - pp - 15:04		Second period	No scoring
Ryan Humphrey (7) - 15:39; Ryan Winterton (11) - en - 18:24		Third period	No scoring
Zach Bowen (23 saves / 24 shots)		Goalie stats	Benjamin Gaudreau (20 saves / 24 shots); Nicholas Surzycia (0 saves / 0 shots)

London wins series 4 – 2

=== J. Ross Robertson Cup finals ===
==== (W2) London Knights vs. (E4) Peterborough Petes ====
May 11	Peterborough Petes	0 – 3	London Knights	Budweiser Gardens	Recap
No scoring		First period	No scoring
No scoring		Second period	14:55 - Easton Cowan (7)
No scoring		Third period	13:31 - Jacob Julien (2); 17:56 - en - Ryan Winterton (12)
Michael Simpson (29 saves / 31 shots)		Goalie stats	Zach Bowen (24 saves / 24 shots)

May 13	Peterborough Petes	5 – 3	London Knights	Budweiser Gardens	Recap
Tucker Robertson (6) - 7:55		First period	No scoring
Avery Hayes (9) - pp - 10:46		Second period	6:38 - Sam Dickinson (3); 12:38 - Sean McGurn (8); 14:51 - pp - Logan Mailloux (7)
Donovan McCoy (1) - 8:14; Tucker Robertson (7) - 10:12; Avery Hayes (10) -		Third period	No scoring
Michael Simpson (51 saves / 54 shots)		Goalie stats	Zach Bowen (22 saves / 27 shots)

May 15	London Knights	5 – 6	OT	Peterborough Petes	Peterborough Memorial Centre	Recap
Sean McGurn (9) - 0:31; Ryan Winterton (13) - pp - 5:12		First period		18:46 - Owen Beck (7)
Sean McGurn (10) - 3:26; Brody Crane (4) - 12:59; Jackson Edward (1) - 14:21		Second period		8:45 - Chase Stillman (3); 11:22 - Brennan Othmann (8)
No scoring		Third period		1:13 - Chase Stillman (4)
No scoring		First overtime period		2:32 - Tucker Robertson (8)
Zach Bowen (19 saves / 25 shots)		Goalie stats		Michael Simpson (34 saves / 39 shots)

May 17	London Knights	3 – 5	Peterborough Petes	Peterborough Memorial Centre	Recap
Easton Cowan (8) - 1:19		First period	No scoring
No scoring		Second period	1:19 - J.R. Avon (8); 9:50 - Owen Beck (8); 11:01 - J.R. Avon (9)
Sam Dickinson (4) - pp - 13:59; Denver Barkey (10) - pp - 16:51		Third period	17:24 - en - Avery Hayes (11)
Zach Bowen (27 saves / 31 shots); Owen Willmore (2 saves / 2 shots)		Goalie stats	Michael Simpson (50 saves / 53 shots)

May 19	Peterborough Petes	1 – 4	London Knights	Budweiser Gardens	Recap
Connor Lockhart (7) - pp - 6:08		First period	18:32 - Easton Cowan (9)
No scoring		Second period	4:31 - Ryan Humphrey (8); 16:55 - Denver Barkey (11)
No scoring		Third period	17:47 - en - Logan Mailloux (8)
Michael Simpson (30 saves / 33 shots)		Goalie stats	Owen Willmore (32 saves / 33 shots)

May 21	London Knights	1 – 2	Peterborough Petes	Peterborough Memorial Centre	Recap
No scoring		First period	No scoring
No scoring		Second period	14:33 - Avery Hayes (12)
Max McCue (4) - 7:59		Third period	11:10 - Tucker Robertson (9)
Owen Willmore (34 saves / 36 shots)		Goalie stats	Michael Simpson (36 saves / 37 shots)

Peterborough wins series 4 – 2

=== Playoff scoring leaders ===
Note: GP = Games played; G = Goals; A = Assists; Pts = Points; PIM = Penalty minutes

Player	Team	GP	G	A	Pts	PIM
Ryan Winterton	London Knights	21	13	16	29	10
Sean McGurn	London Knights	21	10	16	26	18
Brennan Othmann	Peterborough Petes	23	8	17	25	18
Ty Nelson	North Bay Battalion	20	6	19	25	15
Denver Barkey	London Knights	20	11	13	24	18
Logan Mailloux	London Knights	21	8	16	24	45
Brandt Clarke	Barrie Colts	12	7	16	23	13
Tucker Robertson	Peterborough Petes	23	9	13	22	2
Matvey Petrov	North Bay Battalion	20	4	18	22	8
Kyle McDonald	North Bay Battalion	20	14	7	21	22
Easton Cowan	London Knights	20	9	12	21	16

=== Playoff leading goaltenders ===
Note: GP = Games played; Mins = Minutes played; W = Wins; L = Losses: OTL = Overtime losses;
SL = Shootout losses; GA = Goals Allowed; SO = Shutouts; GAA = Goals against average

Player	Team	GP	MINS	W	L	GA	SO	Sv%	GAA
Brett Brochu	London Knights	11	650	9	1	16	4	0.943	1.48
Dom Divincentiis	North Bay Battalion	20	1220	11	9	49	1	0.926	2.41
Benjamin Gaudreau	Sarnia Sting	16	953	10	5	40	3	0.902	2.52
Max Donoso	Ottawa 67's	8	441	4	3	19	1	0.919	2.59
Tristan Lennox	Saginaw Spirit	11	681	4	7	30	0	0.908	2.64

== Awards ==
Playoffs trophies
Trophy name	Recognition	Recipient
J. Ross Robertson Cup	OHL Finals champion	Peterborough Petes
Bobby Orr Trophy	Eastern Conference playoff champion	Peterborough Petes
Wayne Gretzky Trophy	Western Conference playoff champion	London Knights
Wayne Gretzky 99 Award	Playoffs MVP	Michael Simpson, Peterborough Petes
Regular season — Team trophies
Trophy name	Recognition	Recipient
Hamilton Spectator Trophy	Team with best record	Ottawa 67's
Leyden Trophy	East division champion	Ottawa 67's
Emms Trophy	Central division champion	North Bay Battalion
Bumbacco Trophy	West division champion	Windsor Spitfires
Holody Trophy	Midwest division champion	London Knights
Regular season — Executive awards
Trophy name	Recognition	Recipient
Matt Leyden Trophy	Coach of the year	Dave Cameron, Ottawa 67's
Jim Gregory Award	General manager of the year	Mark Hunter, London Knights
Regular season — Player awards
Trophy name	Recognition	Recipient
Red Tilson Trophy	Most outstanding player	Matthew Maggio, Windsor Spitfires
Eddie Powers Memorial Trophy	Top scorer	Matthew Maggio, Windsor Spitfires
Dave Pinkney Trophy	Lowest team goals against	Max Donoso & Collin MacKenzie, Ottawa 67's
Max Kaminsky Trophy	Most outstanding defenceman	Pavel Mintyukov, Saginaw Spirit & Ottawa 67's
Jim Mahon Memorial Trophy	Top scoring right winger	Matthew Maggio, Windsor Spitfires
Emms Family Award	Rookie of the year	Michael Misa, Saginaw Spirit
William Hanley Trophy	Most sportsmanlike player	Evan Vierling, Barrie Colts
F. W. "Dinty" Moore Trophy	Best rookie GAA	Zach Bowen, London Knights
Bobby Smith Trophy	Scholastic player of the year	Colby Barlow, Owen Sound Attack
Leo Lalonde Memorial Trophy	Overage player of the year	Matthew Maggio, Windsor Spitfires
Jim Rutherford Trophy	Goaltender of the year	Dom DiVincentiis, North Bay Battalion
Dan Snyder Memorial Trophy	Humanitarian of the year	Dalyn Wakely, North Bay Battalion
Roger Neilson Memorial Award	Top academic college/university player	Ryder McIntyre, Oshawa Generals
Ivan Tennant Memorial Award	Top academic high school player	George Alboim, Erie Otters & Ethan Hay, Flint Firebirds
Mickey Renaud Captain's Trophy	Team captain that best exemplifies character and commitment	Nolan Dillingham, Sarnia Sting
Prospect player awards
Trophy name	Recognition	Recipient
Jack Ferguson Award	First overall pick in priority selection	Matthew Schaefer, Erie Otters
Tim Adams Memorial Trophy	OHL Cup MVP	Jake O'Brien, Toronto Jr. Canadiens

== All-Star teams ==
The OHL All-Star Teams were selected by the OHL's General Managers.

=== First team ===
- Logan Morrison, Centre, Hamilton Bulldogs/Ottawa 67's
- Colby Barlow, Left Wing, Owen Sound Attack
- Matthew Maggio, Right Wing, Windsor Spitfires
- Pavel Mintyukov, Defence, Saginaw Spirit/Ottawa 67's
- Brandt Clarke, Defence, Barrie Colts
- Domenic DiVicentiis, Goaltender, North Bay Battalion
- Dave Cameron, Coach, Ottawa 67's

=== Second team ===
- Amadeus Lombardi, Centre, Flint Firebirds
- Sasha Pastujov, Left Wing, Guelph Storm/Sarnia Sting
- Ty Voit, Right Wing, Sarnia Sting
- Ethan Del Mastro, Defence, Mississauga Steelheads/Sarnia Sting
- Logan Mailloux, Defence, London Knights
- Brett Brochu, Goaltender, London Knights
- Dale Hunter, Coach, London Knights

=== Third team ===
- Owen Beck, Centre, Mississauga Steelheads/Peterborough Petes
- Brennan Othmann, Left Wing, Flint Firebirds/Peterborough Petes
- Avery Hayes, Right Wing, Hamilton Bulldogs/Peterborough Petes
- Ty Nelson, Defence, North Bay Battalion
- Christian Kyrou, Defence, Erie Otters/Sarnia Sting
- Michael Simpson, Goaltender, Peterborough Petes
- Ryan Oulahen, Coach, North Bay Battalion

=== First All-Rookie team ===
- Joey Willis, Centre, Saginaw Spirit
- Michael Misa, Left Wing, Saginaw Spirit
- Liam Greentree, Right Wing, Windsor Spitfires
- Zayne Parekh, Defence, Saginaw Spirit
- Sam Dickinson, Defence, London Knights
- Zach Bowen, Goaltender, London Knights

=== Second All-Rookie team ===
- Gabriel Frasca, Centre, Kingston Frontenacs
- Easton Cowan, Left Wing, London Knights
- Beckett Sennecke, Right Wing, Ottawa 67's
- Oliver Bonk, Defence, London Knights
- Anthony Cristoforo, Defence, Windsor Spitfires
- Mason Vaccari, Goaltender, Kingston Frontenacs

== 2023 OHL Priority Selection ==
On March 29, 2023, the league announced the results of the Ontario Hockey League Priory Selection Lottery. Each of the four non-playoff participated in the lottery, as the 20th place Niagara IceDogs had a 40% chance of winning, the 19th place Erie Otters had a 30% chance of winning, the 18th place Sault Ste. Marie Greyhounds had a 20% chance of winning, and the 17th place Kingston Frontenacs had a 10% chance of winning. The Erie Otters won the lottery and selected first overall. On April 20, the Otters announced that Matthew Schaefer from the Huron Hurricanes of the SCTA would be the first selection in the draft. The entirety of the OHL Priority Selection Draft will take place over two days, as rounds 1-3 take place on April 21, while rounds 4-15 will be on April 22.

These are the results for the first round of the draft:

#	Player	Nationality	OHL Team	Hometown	Minor Team
1	Matthew Schaefer (RD)	Canada	Erie Otters	Stoney Creek, Ontario	Huron Hurricanes (OMHA-SCTA)
2	Ryan Roobroeck (C)	Canada	Niagara IceDogs	London, Ontario	London Jr. Knights (MHAO-ALI)
3	Brady Martin (C)	Canada	Sault Ste. Marie Greyhounds	Elmira, Ontario	Waterloo Wolves (MHAO-ALI)
4	Tyler Hopkins (C)	Canada	Kingston Frontenacs	Campbellville, Ontario	Huron Hurricanes (OMHA-SCTA)
5	Ethan Czata (C)	Canada	Niagara IceDogs	Brampton, Ontario	Mississauga Rebels (GTHL)
6	Owen Griffin (C)	Canada	Oshawa Generals	Markham, Ontario	York-Simcoe Express (OMHA-ETA)
7	Jack Ivankovic (G)	Canada	Mississauga Steelheads	Mississauga, Ontario	Mississauga Senators (GTHL)
8	Jake O'Brien (C)	Canada	Brantford Bulldogs	Toronto, Ontario	Toronto Jr. Canadiens (GTHL)
9	Caden Taylor (C)	Canada	Sudbury Wolves	Kleinburg, Ontario	Mississauga Senators (GTHL)
10	Cameron Reid (LD)	Canada	Kitchener Rangers	Aylmer, Ontario	Bishop Kearney Selects 15's (Youth-USA)
11	Luca Romano (C)	Canada	Kitchener Rangers	Toronto, Ontario	Toronto Jr. Canadiens (GTHL)
12	Nico Addy (RW)	Canada	Owen Sound Attack	Casselman, Ontario	Toronto Jr. Canadiens (GTHL)
13	Carson Cameron (RD)	Canada	Peterborough Petes	Bobcaygeon, Ontario	Central Ontario Wolves (OMHA-ETA)
14	Quinn Beauchesne (RD)	Canada	Guelph Storm	Ottawa, Ontario	Nepean Raiders (HEO-Midget)
15	Jeremy Martin (LW)	Canada	Flint Firebirds	Ajax, Ontario	Toronto Marlboros (GTHL)
16	Aiden Young (LW)	Canada	Saginaw Spirit	London, Ontario	London Jr. Knights (MHAO-ALI)
17	Ryan Brown (LW)	Canada	Sarnia Sting	Newmarket, Ontario	York-Simcoe Express (OMHA-ETA)
18	William Moore (C)	Canada / United States	London Knights	Mississauga, Ontario	Toronto Marlboros (GTHL)
19	Shamar Moses (RW)	Canada	Barrie Colts	Scarborough, Ontario	Don Mills Flyers (GTHL)
20	Jack Nesbitt (C)	Canada	Windsor Spitfires	Sarnia, Ontario	Lambton Jr. Sting (MHAO-ALI)
21	Carter Kostuch (LW)	Canada	North Bay Battalion	Richmond Hill, Ontario	Vaughan Kings (GTHL)
22	Henry Brzustewicz (RD)	United States	Ottawa 67's	Washington Township, Michigan	North Jersey Avalanche (Youth-USA)

== 2023 CHL Import Draft ==
On July 5, 2023, the Canadian Hockey League conducted the 2023 CHL Import Draft, in which teams in all three CHL leagues participate in. The Erie Otters held the first pick in the draft by a team in the OHL. The Spirit selected Martin Mišiak from Slovakia with the OHL's first selection in the draft.

Below are the players who were selected in the first round by Ontario Hockey League teams in the 2022 CHL Import Draft.

#	Player	Nationality	OHL team	Hometown	Last team
1	Martin Mišiak (C)	Slovakia	Erie Otters	Banská Bystrica, Slovakia	Youngstown Phantoms
4	Urban Podrekar (LD)	Slovenia	Niagara IceDogs	Bled, Slovenia	HK Olimpija Ljubljana
7	Arttu Karki (LD)	Finland	Sault Ste. Marie Greyhounds	Viiala, Finland	Tappara Tampere
10	Emil Pieniniemi (LD)	Finland	Kingston Frontenacs	Kuopio, Finland	Karpat Oulu U20
13	Rasmus Kumpulainen (C)	Finland	Oshawa Generals	Lahti, Finland	Pelicans Lahti U20
16	Jakub Fibigr (LD)	Czech Republic	Mississauga Steelheads	Uničov, Czech Republic	Vitkovice Ostrave Jr.
19	Adam Jiříček (RD)	Czech Republic	Brantford Bulldogs	Plzeň, Czech Republic	Plzen Jr.
22	Jakub Vondraš (G)	Czech Republic	Sudbury Wolves	Plzeň, Czech Republic	Skoda Plzen HC
25	Tomáš Pobežal (C)	Slovakia	Kitchener Rangers	Púchov, Slovakia	Nitra U18
28	Martin Matějíček (LD)	Czech Republic	Owen Sound Attack	Jihlava, Czech Republic	Dukla Jihlava Jr.
31	Rio Kaiser (LD)	Germany	Peterborough Petes	Berlin, Germany	EC Red Bull Salzburg U20 EBYSL
34	Vilmer Alriksson (LW)	Sweden	Guelph Storm	Enebyberg, Sweden	Djurgardens IF Jr.
37	Markas Samenas (LW)	Sweden	Flint Firebirds	Vilnius, Lithuania	Acadie-Bathurst Titan
40	Valentin Zhugin (LW)	Russia	Saginaw Spirit	Magnitogorsk, Russia	Guelph Storm
43	Roman Kukumberg (LW)	Slovakia	Sarnia Sting	Bratislava, Slovakia	Slovan Bratislava
46	Daniil Ustinkov (LD)	Switzerland	London Knights	Zürich, Switzerland	GCK Lions Jr.
49	Michael Brandsegg-Nygård (C)	Norway	Barrie Colts	Oslo, Norway	Mora IK Jr.
52	Josef Eichler (RD)	Czech Republic	Windsor Spitfires	Benešov, Czech Republic	Plzen Jr.
55	Ihnat Pazii (C)	Ukraine	North Bay Battalion	Kharkiv, Ukraine	Windy City Storm 16U
57	Tuomas Uronen (RW)	Finland	Ottawa 67's	Kerava, Finland	HIFK Helsinki U20

== 2023 NHL entry draft ==
On June 28–29, 2023, the National Hockey League conducted the 2023 NHL entry draft at Bridgestone Arena in Nashville, Tennessee. Colby Barlow of the Owen Sound Attack was the highest player from the OHL to be selected, as he was taken with the 18th overall pick by the Winnipeg Jets. A total of 35 players were drafted from the OHL.

Below are the players selected from OHL teams at the NHL Entry Draft.

Round	#	Player	Nationality	NHL team	Hometown	OHL team
1	18	Colby Barlow (LW)	Canada	Winnipeg Jets	Orillia, Ontario	Owen Sound Attack
1	22	Oliver Bonk (D)	Canada	Philadelphia Flyers	Ottawa, Ontario	London Knights
1	26	Quentin Musty (LW)	United States	San Jose Sharks	Hamburg, New York	Sudbury Wolves
1	27	Calum Ritchie (C)	Canada	Colorado Avalanche	Oakville, Ontario	Oshawa Generals
1	28	Easton Cowan (RW)	Canada	Toronto Maple Leafs	Mount Brydges, Ontario	London Knights
2	42	Andrew Gibson (D)	Canada	Detroit Red Wings	LaSalle, Ontario	Sault Ste. Marie Greyhounds
2	50	Carson Rehkopf (LW)	Canada	Seattle Kraken	Vaughan, Ontario	Kitchener Rangers
2	56	Beau Akey (D)	Canada	Edmonton Oilers	Waterloo, Ontario	Barrie Colts
2	59	Carey Terrance (C)	United States	Anaheim Ducks	Akwesasne, New York	Erie Otters
2	61	Tristan Bertucci (D)	Canada	Dallas Stars	Vaughan, Ontario	Flint Firebirds
3	65	Coulson Pitre (RW)	Canada	Anaheim Ducks	Stouffville, Ontario	Flint Firebirds
3	67	Nick Lardis (LW)	Canada	Chicago Blackhawks	Oakville, Ontario	Hamilton Bulldogs
3	74	Quinton Burns (D)	Canada	St. Louis Blues	Smiths Falls, Ontario	Kingston Frontenacs
3	75	Hunter Brzustewicz (D)	United States	Vancouver Canucks	Washington, Michigan	Kitchener Rangers
3	79	Brad Gardiner (C)	Canada	Dallas Stars	Aurora, Ontario	Ottawa 67's
3	95	Denver Barkey (C)	Canada	Philadelphia Flyers	Newmarket, Ontario	London Knights
4	97	Konnor Smith (D)	Canada	Anaheim Ducks	Windsor, Ontario	Peterborough Petes
4	99	Alex Pharand (C)	Canada	Chicago Blackhawks	Sudbury, Ontario	Sudbury Wolves
4	101	Florian Xhekaj (LW)	Canada	Montreal Canadiens	Hamilton, Ontario	Hamilton Bulldogs
4	104	Patrick Thomas (C)	Canada	Washington Capitals	Hamilton, Ontario	Hamilton Bulldogs
4	109	Ethan Miedema (LW)	Canada	Buffalo Sabres	Cobourg, Ontario	Kingston Frontenacs
4	111	Joey Willis (C)	United States	Nashville Predators	Elmhurst, Illinois	Saginaw Spirit
4	114	Luca Pinelli (C)	Canada	Columbus Blue Jackets	Stoney Creek, Ontario	Ottawa 67's
5	129	Rodwin Dionicio (D)	United States	Anaheim Ducks	Newark, New Jersey	Windsor Spitfires
5	136	Cam Allen (D)	Canada	Washington Capitals	Toronto, Ontario	Guelph Storm
5	140	Matthew Andonovski (D)	Canada	Ottawa Senators	Markham, Ontario	Kitchener Rangers
5	146	Jacob Julien (C)	Canada	Winnipeg Jets	London, Ontario	London Knights
5	150	Matthew Mania (D)	United States	Los Angeles Kings	Olmsted, Ohio	Sudbury Wolves
6	164	Cole Brown (LW)	Canada	New Jersey Devils	Aurora, Ontario	Hamilton Bulldogs
6	170	Matthew Mayich (D)	Canada	St. Louis Blues	Stoney Creek, Ontario	Ottawa 67's
6	174	Cooper Foster (LW)	Canada	Pittsburgh Penguins	Sault Ste. Marie, Ontario	Ottawa 67's
6	178	Dylan Roobroeck (C)	Canada	New York Rangers	London, Ontario	Ottawa 67's
6	184	Nathan Day (G)	Canada	Edmonton Oilers	Grimsby, Ontario	Flint Firebirds
6	189	Angus MacDonell (C)	Canada	Dallas Stars	Toronto, Ontario	Mississauga Steelheads
7	211	Ethan Hay (C)	Canada	Tampa Bay Lightning	Waterloo, Ontario	Flint Firebirds

== 2023 IIHF World Junior Championship ==
The 2023 IIHF World Junior Championship was held at Scotiabank Centre in Halifax, Nova Scotia, and at Avenir Centre in Moncton, New Brunswick which began on December 26, 2022 ended on January 5, 2023.

Eighteen current and former OHL players were on eight rosters in this tournament, including six on Canada, three on Switzerland, two on Czechia, Slovakia and the United States, and one on Austria, Germany and Latvia.

=== Austria ===
Team Austria had one OHL player on their roster, as Vinzenz Rohrer of the Ottawa 67's was named to the team.

In five games, Rohrer finished in third in team scoring, as he recorded a goal and two assists for three points.

Austria finished the preliminary round of the tournament in last place in Group A with a 0-0-0-4 record. In the best-of-three relegation round, Austria lost to Latvia in two games to finish in tenth place in the tournament.

=== Canada ===
The Canadian team had six current and former OHL players on their original roster. The players on the Canadian team who currently played in the OHL are: Ethan Del Mastro, Mississauga Steelheads; Ben Gaudreau, Sarnia Sting; Jack Matier, Ottawa 67's and Brennan Othmann, Peterborough Petes. Two former OHL players were also on the team: former Barrie Colts player Brandt Clarke, who played on the Los Angeles Kings and former Kingston Frontenacs player Shane Wright of the Seattle Kraken.Wright and Clarke both where sent down to the OHL after the tournament. Wright was named captain of the team. Later in the tournament, Canada added Owen Beck from the Mississauga Steelheads as an injury replacement.

In seven games, Clarke led the Canadian defense with two goals and eight points. Wright scored four goals and seven points in seven games. Othmann scored two goals and six points in seven games, while Del Mastro earned three assists in seven games. Beck earned an assist in three games and Matier had an assist in seven games. Gaudreau earned a record of 1-1-0 in two games with a 3.38 GAA and a 0.828 save percentage.

Canada finished second in Group A during the preliminary round with a record of 3-0-0-1, earning nine points. In the quarter-finals, Canada defeated Slovakia 4-3 in overtime. In the semi-finals, the Canadians defeated the United States 6-2, advancing to the championship game. In the Gold Medal game, Canada defeated Czechia 3-2 in overtime to win the tournament.

=== Czechia ===
Team Czechia had two OHL players on their roster. The players named to the team were Tomáš Hamara of the Kitchener Rangers and Matyáš Šapovaliv of the Saginaw Spirit.

Sapovaliv earned seven assists in seven games to finish tied for fifth in team scoring. Hamara earned an assist in seven games.

Czechia finished in first place in Group A during the preliminary round, earning a record of 3-0-1-0 for ten points. In the quarter-finals, Czechia defeated Switzerland 9-1 to advance to the semi-finals. In the semi-final game, Czechia defeated Sweden 2-1 to earn a berth in the Gold Medal game. In the final game of the tournament, Czechia lost to Canada 3-2 in overtime to win the silver medal.

=== Germany ===
Team Germany had one OHL player on their roster. Ryan Del Monte of the London Knights was the lone OHL player that made the team.

Del Monte was held to no points in two games during the tournament.

Germany finished in fourth place in Group A during the preliminary round with a 1-0-0-3 record, earning three points. In the quarter-finals, Germany lost to the United States 11-1 to be eliminated from the tournament. Germany finished in eighth place in the tournament.

=== Latvia ===
Latvia had one OHL player on their roster. Sandis Vilmanis of the Sarnia Sting was named to the team.

Vilmanis scored a goal and added an assist for two points in six games.

Latvia finished the preliminary round of the tournament in last place in Group B with a record of 0-0-1-3, earning one point. In the best-of-three relegation series against Austria, Latvia swept the series in two games. Latvia finished the tournament in ninth place.

=== Slovakia ===
Team Slovakia had two OHL players on their roster, as Filip Mešár of the Kitchener Rangers and Servác Petrovský of the Owen Sound Attack were named to the team.

Mesar finished tied for the team lead in points, as he recorded two goals and four assists for six points in five games. Petrovsky scored two goals and three points in five games to finish tied for fifth in team scoring.

Slovakia finished the preliminary round of the tournament with a 2-0-1-1 record, finishing in third place with seven points. In the quarter-finals, Slovakia lost to Canada 4-3 in overtime. Slovakia finished the tournament in sixth place.

=== Switzerland ===
Team Switzerland named three OHL players to their team. Alessio Beglieri of the Mississauga Steelheads, Rodwin Dionicio of the Niagara IceDogs and Brian Zanetti of the Peterborough Petes represented their country at the tournament.

In five games, Dionico scored a goal, while Zanetti earned an assist in five games. Beglieri earned a record of 0-2-0 with a 6.07 GAA and a 0.831 save percentage in two games.

Switzerland had a record of 0-3-0-1 in four games during the preliminary round, earning six points and fourth place in Group B. In the quarter-finals, Switzerland lost to Czechia 9-1. Switzerland finished the tournament in seventh place.

=== United States ===
The United States had two players of the OHL on their roster. The players were Tyler Boucher of the Ottawa 67's and Andrew Oke of the Saginaw Spirit.

Boucher finished the tournament with three goals and four points in six games. Oke earned a record of 1-0-0 with a 3.00 GAA and a 0.875 save percentage in one game.

The United States finished in first place in Group B with a 3-0-0-1 record, earning nine points, during the preliminary round. In the quarter-finals, the United States defeated Germany 9-1 to advance to the semi-finals. In the semi-final game, the United States lost to Canada 6-2 to advance to the Bronze Medal game. The United States captured the bronze medal with a 8-7 overtime win over Sweden.

Preceded by 2021–22 OHL season	OHL seasons	Succeeded by 2023–24 OHL season
