= Luca Del Bel Belluz =

Canadian ice hockey player (born 2003)

- Born: November 10, 2003 (age 23) Vaughan, Ontario, Canada
- Height: 6 ft 1 in (185 cm)
- Weight: 185 lb (84 kg; 13 st 3 lb)
- Position: Centre
- Shoots: Left
- NHL team: Columbus Blue Jackets
- NHL draft: 44th overall, 2022; Columbus Blue Jackets
- Playing career: 2023–present

Luca Del Bel Belluz (born November 10, 2003) is a Canadian professional ice hockey centre for the Columbus Blue Jackets of the National Hockey League (NHL). He was drafted by the Columbus Blue Jackets in the second round, 44th overall in the 2022 NHL entry draft.

== Career statistics ==
| | | | Regular season | | | | | Playoffs |
| Season | Team | League | GP | G | A | Pts | PIM | GP | G | A | Pts | PIM |
|---|---|---|---|---|---|---|---|---|---|---|---|---|
| 2019–20 | Mississauga Steelheads | OHL | 58 | 1 | 5 | 6 | 8 | — | — | — | — | — |
| 2021–22 | Mississauga Steelheads | OHL | 68 | 30 | 46 | 76 | 28 | 10 | 1 | 3 | 4 | 0 |
| 2022–23 | Mississauga Steelheads | OHL | 34 | 20 | 21 | 41 | 10 | — | — | — | — | — |
| 2022–23 | Sarnia Sting | OHL | 32 | 20 | 26 | 46 | 4 | 16 | 8 | 7 | 15 | 4 |
| 2023–24 | Cleveland Monsters | AHL | 58 | 9 | 22 | 31 | 12 | 9 | 1 | 1 | 2 | 4 |
| 2023–24 | Columbus Blue Jackets | NHL | 1 | 1 | 0 | 1 | 0 | — | — | — | — | — |
| 2024–25 | Cleveland Monsters | AHL | 61 | 27 | 26 | 53 | 12 | 6 | 1 | 2 | 3 | 0 |
| 2024–25 | Columbus Blue Jackets | NHL | 15 | 2 | 6 | 8 | 0 | — | — | — | — | — |
| 2025–26 | Cleveland Monsters | AHL | 55 | 22 | 36 | 58 | 2 | 9 | 1 | 6 | 7 | 2 |
| 2025–26 | Columbus Blue Jackets | NHL | 14 | 0 | 1 | 1 | 4 | — | — | — | — | — |
| NHL totals | | | 30 | 3 | 7 | 10 | 4 | — | — | — | — | — |
