= Tristan Lennox =

Canadian ice hockey player

- Born: October 21, 2002 (age 23) Ottawa, Ontario, Canada
- Height: 6 ft 3 in (191 cm)
- Weight: 193 lb (88 kg; 13 st 11 lb)
- Position: Goaltender
- Catches: Left
- NHL team Former teams: Free agent New York Islanders
- NHL draft: 93rd overall, 2021; New York Islanders
- Playing career: 2023–present

Tristan Lennox (born October 21, 2002) is a Canadian professional ice hockey goaltender who is currently an unrestricted free agent. He most recently played for the Worcester Railers in the ECHL as a prospect to the New York Islanders of the National Hockey League (NHL).

== Career statistics ==
=== Regular season and playoffs ===
			Regular season									Playoffs
Season	Team	League	GP	W	L	OT	MIN	GA	SO	GAA	SV%	GP	W	L	MIN	GA	SO	GAA	SV%
2018–19	Brantford 99ers	OJHL	11	4	7	0	642	40	0	3.74	.918	—	—	—	—	—	—	—	—
2018–19	Saginaw Spirit	OHL	15	7	2	1	732	34	1	2.79	.907	7	2	4	328	17	0	3.11	.911
2019–20	Saginaw Spirit	OHL	33	20	8	3	1,884	114	0	3.63	.876	—	—	—	—	—	—	—	—
2021–22	Saginaw Spirit	OHL	28	7	20	0	1,554	83	0	3.20	.888	—	—	—	—	—	—	—	—
2022–23	Saginaw Spirit	OHL	45	25	15	4	2,592	136	3	3.15	.888	11	4	4	681	30	0	2.64	.908
2023–24	Worcester Railers	ECHL	13	5	6	2	755	37	0	2.94	.909	—	—	—	—	—	—	—	—
2024–25	New York Islanders	NHL	1	0	0	0	5	1	0	12.72	.500	—	—	—	—	—	—	—	—
2024–25	Bridgeport Islanders	AHL	6	0	5	0	335	23	0	4.12	.853	—	—	—	—	—	—	—	—
2025–26	Worcester Railers	ECHL	18	5	10	1	1,003	59	0	3.53	.883	—	—	—	—	—	—	—	—
NHL totals			1	0	0	0	5	1	0	12.72	.500	—	—	—	—	—	—	—	—

=== International ===
Year	Team	Event	GP	W	L	T	MIN	GA	SO	GAA	SV%
2018	Canada White U17	WHC-17	3	2	0	0	190	8	0	2.53	.915
2019	Canada U18	Hlinka Gretzky Cup	3	3	0	0	190	3	1	0.95	.951
Junior totals			6	5	0	0	380	11	1	1.74	.929
