= Ty Nelson =

Canadian ice hockey player (born 2004)

- Born: March 30, 2004 (age 22) Toronto, Ontario, Canada
- Height: 5 ft 9 in (175 cm)
- Weight: 195 lb (88 kg; 13 st 13 lb)
- Position: Defenceman
- Shoots: Right
- NHL team (P) Cur. team: Seattle Kraken; Coachella Valley Firebirds (AHL)
- NHL draft: 68th overall, 2022; Seattle Kraken
- Playing career: 2024–present

Ty Nelson (born March 30, 2004) is a Canadian professional ice hockey player who is a defenceman for the Coachella Valley Firebirds of the American Hockey League (AHL) while under contract to the Seattle Kraken of the National Hockey League (NHL). He was drafted in the third round, 68th overall, by the Kraken in the 2022 NHL entry draft.

A native of Ontario, Nelson played in the Greater Toronto Hockey League (GTHL) with the Toronto Jr. Canadiens, winning the GTHL championship in his final season with the team. He was then selected first overall in the 2020 Ontario Hockey League (OHL) priority selection by the North Bay Battalion. After establishing himself as a top defenceman on the team, he was signed by the Kraken in 2023. In 2024, after three seasons with the Battalion, he joined the Coachella Valley Firebirds. In his first season with the team, he played all 72 games.

Internationally, Nelson has represented Canada, doing so at the 2024 World Junior Ice Hockey Championships.

== Playing career ==
=== Junior ===
Nelson was born on March 30, 2004, to parents Rick and Tracy in Toronto. In his hometown, Nelson played minor hockey with the Toronto Jr. Canadiens of the Greater Toronto Hockey League (GTHL). During the 2019–20 season, through 33 games, Nelson tallied 11 goals and 21 assists for 32 points, leading the league in scoring by a defenceman. As an alternate captain of the team, Nelson's efforts helped the Jr. Canadiens win the GTHL championship that season, scoring 12 points in 11 games during the playoffs. Following his success in the GTHL, on April 4, 2020, Nelson was selected as the first overall pick in the 2020 Ontario Hockey League (OHL) priority selection by the North Bay Battalion. Nelson did not play in the OHL for the 2020–21 season, as it was cancelled by the league due to the COVID-19 pandemic.

Nelson was named an alternate captain of the Petes to start the 2021–22 season. On October 7, 2021, Nelson made his OHL debut, collecting an assist on a goal by Matvey Petrov as part of a 7–4 victory over the Peterborough Petes. A week later, on October 15, he scored his first OHL goal in a 7–1 win over the Mississauga Steelheads. Nelson finished his first OHL season with 9 goals and 42 assists for 51 points through 66 games, ranking 11th among all OHL defensemen and first among rookie defencemen in scoring. During the 2022 OHL playoffs, Nelson notched 10 assists in 13 games. On June 21, 2022, Nelson was named to the OHL's Second All-Rookie Team. On July 8, Nelson was selected in the third round, 68th overall, by the Seattle Kraken in the 2022 NHL entry draft.

Nelson participated in the Kraken's development camp in July 2022 and their rookie camp in September, before being reassigned to the Battalion on September 28. In his first six games of the 2022–23 season, put up three goals and four assists through is first six games. By November 30, Nelson led the Battalion in scoring with 27 points through 23 games. In 67 total games, Nelson tallied 24 goals and 52 assists for 76 points, a franchise record for most goals in a season by a defenceman. In three rounds of the 2023 OHL playoffs, Nelson recorded six goals and 19 assists for 25 points, leading all OHL players in scoring during that time. On May 11, 2023, Nelson signed a three-year, entry-level contract with the Kraken.

Nelson once again participated in the Kraken's development camp prior to the 2023–24 season. After participating in training camp, he was reassigned to the Battalion on September 27. With the team, he totaled 16 goals and 36 assists in 54 games. In the 2024 OHL playoffs, he notched five goals and nine assists in 16 games. On May 12, 2024, Nelson was reassigned to the Coachella Valley Firebirds, the American Hockey League (AHL) affiliate of the Kraken.

=== Professional ===
Prior to the 2024–25 season, Nelson once again participated in the Kraken's rookie camp. He played in a preseason game against the Vancouver Canucks on September 24, 2024, taking a penalty, before he was reassigned to the Firebirds on September 27. Nelson made his AHL debut on the Firebirds' season opener on October 11, collecting an assists on the only Firebirds goal in a 2–1 loss to the Bakersfield Condors. On November 2, Nelson scored his first professional goal, part of a 5–3 loss to the Condors. Nelson was one of only two Firebirds players to play all 72 games in the season, collecting six goals and 26 assists while doing so. During the 2025 Calder Cup playoffs, Nelson scored his first professional postseason goal on May 3, 2025, in a 5–4 win over the Abbotsford Canucks. That was the only goal Nelson scored in six playoff games.

Nelson featured in the Kraken's rookie camp once more before the 2025–26 season. On February 7, 2026, with the Firebirds, Nelson scored the overtime game-winning goal in a 4–3 victory over the Henderson Silver Knights. He scored another overtime goal on March 14 in a 4–3 win against the Ontario Reign. In 63 games, Nelson tallied 11 goals and 24 assists for 35 points. During the 2026 Calder Cup playoffs, he put up one goal and five assists in 12 games.

== International play ==
On December 23, 2023, due to injuries to Tristan Luneau and Tanner Molendyk, Nelson was named to Canada's roster for the 2024 World Junior Ice Hockey Championships. On December 28, Nelson recorded two assists in a 10–0 victory over Latvia. He would add one more assist during the tournament to total three assists through five games.

== Career statistics ==
=== Regular season and playoffs ===
			Regular season					Playoffs
Season	Team	League	GP	G	A	Pts	PIM	GP	G	A	Pts	PIM
2021–22	North Bay Battalion	OHL	66	9	42	51	39	13	0	10	10	6
2022–23	North Bay Battalion	OHL	67	24	52	76	60	20	6	19	25	15
2023–24	North Bay Battalion	OHL	54	16	36	52	50	16	5	9	14	10
2024–25	Coachella Valley Firebirds	AHL	72	6	26	32	48	6	1	0	1	0
2025–26	Coachella Valley Firebirds	AHL	63	11	24	35	26	12	1	5	6	2
AHL totals			135	17	50	67	74	18	2	5	7	2

=== International ===
Year	Team	Event	Result	GP	G	A	Pts	PIM
2024	Canada	WJC	5th	5	0	3	3	0
Junior totals				5	0	3	3	0
