= Riley Stillman =

Canadian ice hockey player (born 1998)

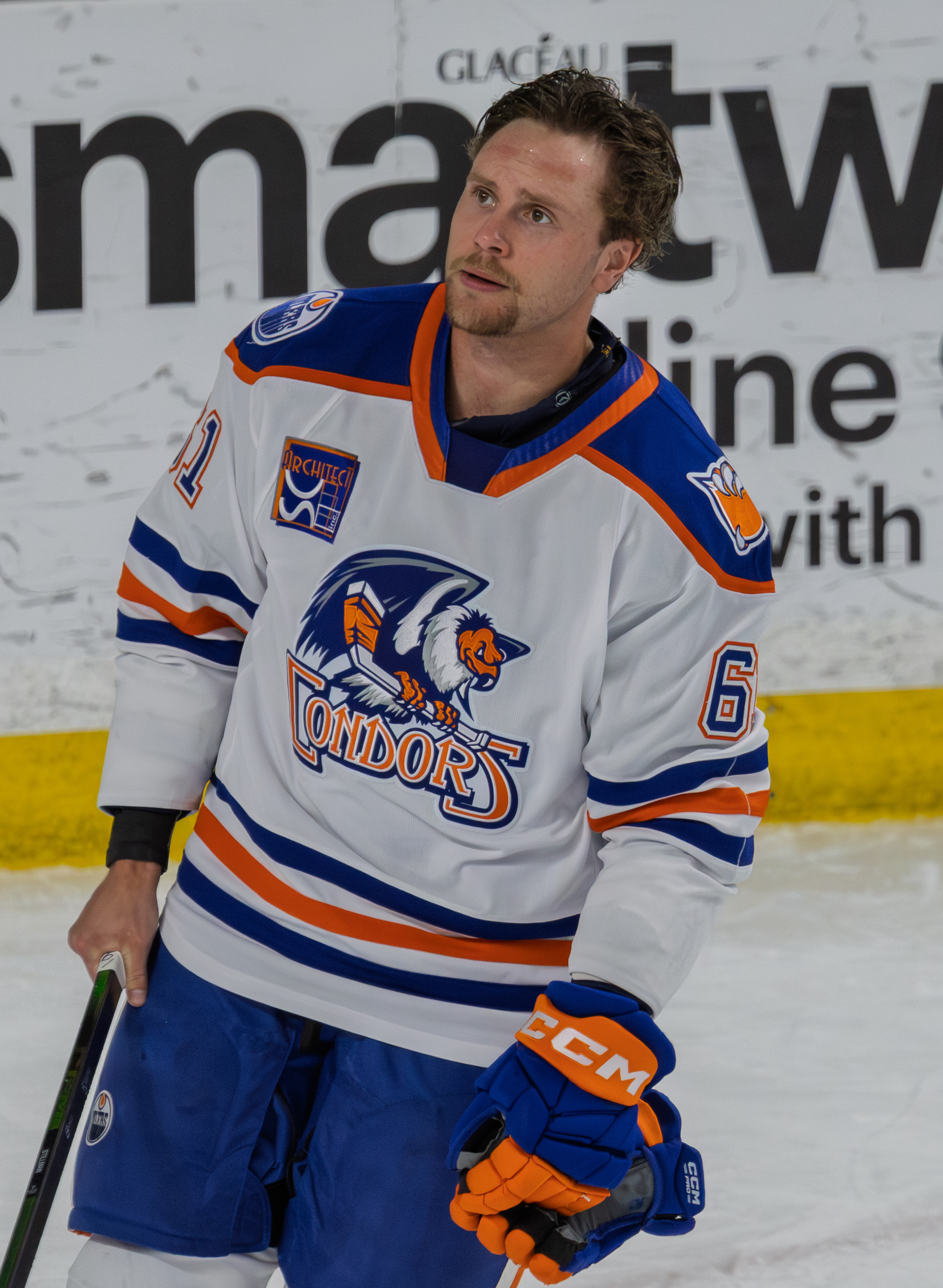
- Stillman with the Bakersfield Condors in 2026
- Born: March 9, 1998 (age 28) Calgary, Alberta, Canada
- Height: 6 ft 2 in (188 cm)
- Weight: 203 lb (92 kg; 14 st 7 lb)
- Position: Defence
- Shoots: Left
- NHL team (P) Cur. team Former teams: Edmonton Oilers; Bakersfield Condors (AHL); Florida Panthers; Chicago Blackhawks; Vancouver Canucks; Buffalo Sabres; Carolina Hurricanes
- NHL draft: 114th overall, 2016; Florida Panthers
- Playing career: 2018–present

Riley Stillman (born March 9, 1998) is a Canadian professional ice hockey player who is a defenceman for the Bakersfield Condors of the American Hockey League (AHL) while under contract to the Edmonton Oilers of the National Hockey League (NHL). He was selected by the Florida Panthers in the fourth round, 114th overall, of the 2016 NHL entry draft.

== Playing career ==
=== Junior ===
Stillman played bantam and midget hockey within the Peterborough Petes organization before playing in the Ontario Junior Hockey League with the Cobourg Cougars in the 2014–15 season. He was selected prior to the season 63rd overall in the 2013 OHL Priority Selection by the Oshawa Generals. Stillman joined the Generals through the end season from the Cougars, featuring in 9 games.

Following a promising rookie campaign on the blueline, posting 21 points in 62 games with the Generals, in the 2015–16 season, Stillman was selected in the 2016 NHL entry draft by the Florida Panthers, 114th overall.

During his final junior season in 2017–18, Stillman was traded by the Generals to contending club, the Hamilton Bulldogs in exchange for future draft picks on December 28, 2017.

On March 5, 2018, Stillman was signed to a three-year, entry-level contract with the Florida Panthers. He established new career highs with a combined 29 assists and 34 points, in helping the Bulldogs claim the J. Ross Robertson Cup.

=== Professional ===
After attending the Panthers 2018 training camp, Stillman was assigned to begin his professional career with AHL affiliate, the Springfield Thunderbirds, for the 2018–19 season. Exhibiting a responsible two-way game with the Thunderbirds, Stillman posted 11 points through 46 games before he received his first recall to the Panthers on February 26, 2019. He made his debut that night for the Panthers in a 4–3 overtime defeat to the Arizona Coyotes at Gila River Arena in Glendale, Arizona. In playing for the Panthers, Stillman joined his father in becoming the first father and son to have played with the franchise.

During the 2020–21 season, on April 8, 2021, Stillman was traded by the Panthers alongside Brett Connolly, the rights to Henrik Borgström and a 2021 seventh-round draft pick to the Chicago Blackhawks in exchange for Lucas Carlsson and Lucas Wallmark.

On April 25, 2021, Stillman signed a three-year, $4.05 million contract extension with the Blackhawks.

Approaching the 2022–23 season, Stillman was traded by the Blackhawks to the Vancouver Canucks in exchange for Jason Dickinson and a second-round pick in the 2024 NHL entry draft on October 7, 2022. Stillman limited through injury, appeared in 32 games with the Canucks and registered 5 assists. Nearing the NHL trade deadline, the Canucks dealt Stillman to the Buffalo Sabres in exchange for prospect Josh Bloom on February 27, 2023.

After parts of two seasons with the Sabres organization, Stillman left the club as a free agent and signed a one-year, two-way contract with the Carolina Hurricanes on July 3, 2024. He started the season with the AHL affiliate Chicago Wolves, before making his Hurricanes debut on January 28, 2025 in a 4–0 win at the New York Rangers. Stillman wore number 61 with Carolina, just as his father did.

A free agent after a lone season with the Hurricanes, Stillman signed a two-year, two-way contract with the Edmonton Oilers on July 1, 2025.

== Personal life ==
Stillman was born in Calgary when his father, Cory was a member of the Calgary Flames. He grew up in Peterborough, Ontario once his father's career ended. His brother, Chase, plays in the Vancouver Canucks organization. Fellow NHL player Sam Lafferty is his brother-in-law.

== Career statistics ==
			Regular season					Playoffs
Season	Team	League	GP	G	A	Pts	PIM	GP	G	A	Pts	PIM
2014–15	Cobourg Cougars	OJHL	46	5	19	24	53	9	1	1	2	16
2014–15	Oshawa Generals	OHL	9	0	0	0	5	—	—	—	—	—
2015–16	Oshawa Generals	OHL	62	6	15	21	69	5	0	0	0	2
2016–17	Oshawa Generals	OHL	62	11	22	33	76	11	1	9	10	8
2017–18	Oshawa Generals	OHL	29	1	12	13	52	—	—	—	—	—
2017–18	Hamilton Bulldogs	OHL	33	4	17	21	28	21	5	9	14	23
2018–19	Springfield Thunderbirds	AHL	59	4	13	17	52	—	—	—	—	—
2018–19	Florida Panthers	NHL	1	0	0	0	2	—	—	—	—	—
2019–20	Springfield Thunderbirds	AHL	25	3	3	6	20	—	—	—	—	—
2019–20	Florida Panthers	NHL	34	0	5	5	14	3	0	0	0	0
2020–21	Florida Panthers	NHL	8	0	0	0	14	—	—	—	—	—
2020–21	Syracuse Crunch	AHL	5	0	3	3	4	—	—	—	—	—
2020–21	Chicago Blackhawks	NHL	13	1	0	1	2	—	—	—	—	—
2021–22	Chicago Blackhawks	NHL	52	2	10	12	36	—	—	—	—	—
2022–23	Vancouver Canucks	NHL	32	0	5	5	23	—	—	—	—	—
2022–23	Buffalo Sabres	NHL	18	1	2	3	13	—	—	—	—	—
2023–24	Rochester Americans	AHL	47	2	4	6	49	—	—	—	—	—
2024–25	Chicago Wolves	AHL	35	3	6	9	58	—	—	—	—	—
2024–25	Carolina Hurricanes	NHL	5	0	0	0	7	—	—	—	—	—
2025–26	Bakersfield Condors	AHL	51	3	15	18	81	3	2	0	2	8
2025–26	Edmonton Oilers	NHL	4	0	0	0	0	—	—	—	—	—
NHL totals			167	4	22	26	111	3	0	0	0	0

== Awards and honours ==
Award	Year
OJHL
Second All-Prospect Team	2015
OHL
J. Ross Robertson Cup champion	2018
