= Brennan Othmann =

Canadian ice hockey player (born 2003)

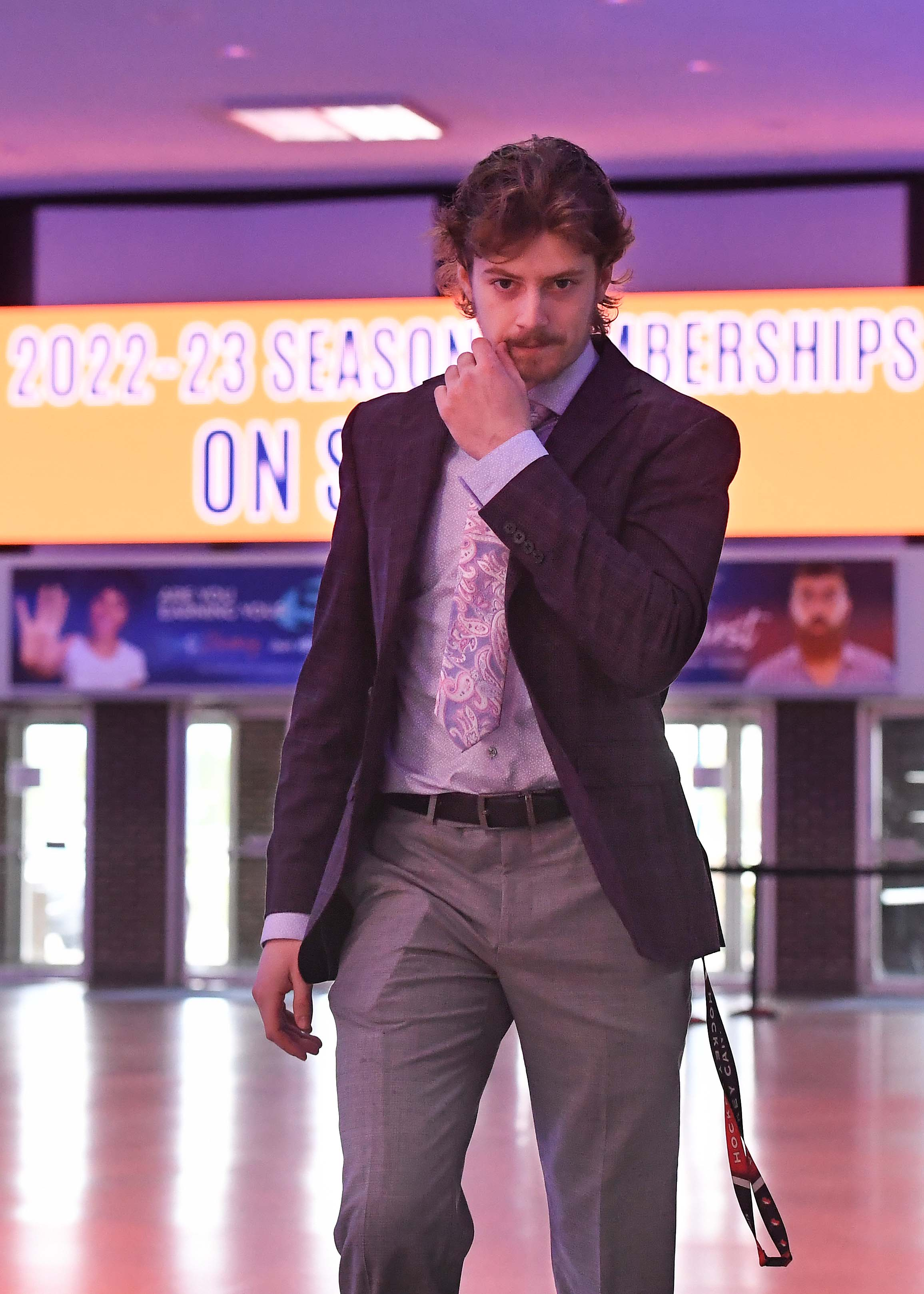
- Othmann in 2022
- Born: January 5, 2003 (age 23) Scarborough, Ontario, Canada
- Height: 6 ft 0 in (183 cm)
- Weight: 195 lb (88 kg; 13 st 13 lb)
- Position: Left wing
- Shoots: Left
- NHL team Former teams: Calgary Flames; New York Rangers
- NHL draft: 16th overall, 2021; New York Rangers
- Playing career: 2020–present

Brennan Othmann (born January 5, 2003) is a Canadian professional ice hockey player who is a left winger for the Calgary Flames of the National Hockey League (NHL). He was drafted in the first round, 16th overall, by the New York Rangers in the 2021 NHL entry draft.

== Playing career ==
Othmann played for the Flint Firebirds of the Ontario Hockey League (OHL) in the 2019–20 season, and when the OHL shut down for the 2020–21 season he played for EHC Olten of the Swiss League. In the 2021 NHL entry draft, he was selected by the New York Rangers. On August 12, 2021, Othmann signed a three-year, entry-level contract with the Rangers. He was assigned back to Flint after an impressive 2021 training camp with the Rangers.

After registering 50 goals and 47 assists for Flint in 2021–22, Othmann was named the OHL's First Team All-Star left wing. Despite playing impressively at the Rangers 2022 training camp, Othmann was sent back to Flint, and was chosen by the media as the winner of the Lars-Erik Sjoberg Award for being the Rangers' best rookie at training camp. Othmann was traded to the Peterborough Petes on November 12, 2022. Othmann had 18 goals and 25 assists for 43 points in 40 regular season games for the Petes. He then led the Petes with 17 assists and 25 points in 23 playoff games as the Petes won the OHL Championship. As OHL champions, the Petes qualified to the 2023 Memorial Cup in Kamloops, facing the host Blazers, the Quebec Remparts, and the Seattle Thunderbirds. The Petes were ultimately eliminated in the semi-final by the Thunderbirds.

Going into the 2023–24 season, Rangers' director of player personnel and amateur scouting John Lilley said of his chances of making the team out of training camp: "Well, he's an excellent player. He has offense. He's feisty. He plays a good two-way game. It is the next step." Othmann started the season with the Hartford Wolf Pack of the American Hockey League (AHL). He was called up to the Rangers on January 3, 2024, and made his NHL debut the following day in a 4–1 win against the Chicago Blackhawks. He was reassigned to Hartford after playing in three games for the Rangers. He finished the season 2nd on Hartford in goals and points, and led the team with 10 power play goals. After Hartford was eliminated from the Calder Cup playoffs, he was recalled to the Rangers roster for the Stanley Cup playoffs.

Prior to the 2024–25 season, USA Today writer Vincent Z. Mercogliano rated him as the Rangers 2nd best prospect, particularly praising his shot. The Hockey News and McKeen's Hockey also rated him as the Rangers' 2nd best prospect. He started the season at Hartford and had 2 goals and 3 assists in his first three games before a wrist injury kept him out of the lineup through December. He was recalled to the Rangers on February 24, after having scored 12 goals and 8 assists in 27 games for Hartford. Othmann recorded his first NHL point with an assist on an Adam Fox goal in a game against the Vancouver Canucks on March 22, 2025, his 16th NHL game. However, he did not score a goal in 22 games for the Rangers.

Prior to the 2025–26 season, Hockey News writer Stan Fischler rated Othmann as the Rangers' 2nd best prospect. Vincent Z. Mercogliano and Peter Baugh of The Athletic rated Othmann as the Rangers' 4th best prospect. He started the season with Hartford but was recalled to the Rangers on 24 October 2025. He was returned to Hartford after playing one game. After a few more trips between New York and Hartford, he scored his first NHL goal in his 34th NHL game on 17 January 2026 against the Philadelphia Flyers. However, he was demoted to Hartford after the February break for the Olympics, his fourth demotion of the season.

On March 6, 2026, Othmann was traded to the Calgary Flames in exchange for Jacob Battaglia.

== International play ==
Medal record

Representing Canada

Ice hockey

World Junior Championships
| Gold medal – first place | 2022 Canada | |
| Gold medal – first place | 2023 Canada | |

World U18 Championships
| Gold medal – first place | 2021 United States | |

Despite the excellent 2021–22 season, Othmann was not included on Team Canada for the originally-scheduled 2022 World Junior Ice Hockey Championships in December 2021 through January 2022. After the original tournament was cancelled due to the Omicron variant, Othmann was selected for the rescheduled tournament in August 2022. Team Canada won the gold medal. Othmann said of playing on Team Canada with fellow Rangers' prospects Will Cuylle and Dylan Garand "It was a lot of fun, for sure. I think that you get to know them a little bit more. We got to know G a little bit, he’s a different character. You have to ask Cools about him. He’s a lot of fun and Cools and I built a good friendship, bonded out there, too. It’s two great guys, two guys I’ll be growing up with for the rest of my life, hopefully. I was very fortunate to have that with them."

On December 12, 2022, Othmann was again named to Team Canada to compete at the 2023 World Junior Ice Hockey Championships. During the tournament he recorded two goals and four assists in seven games and won a gold medal.

== Career statistics ==
=== Regular season and playoffs ===
| | | | Regular season | | | | | Playoffs |
| Season | Team | League | GP | G | A | Pts | PIM | GP | G | A | Pts | PIM |
|---|---|---|---|---|---|---|---|---|---|---|---|---|
| 2018–19 | Don Mills Flyers | GTHL | 33 | 33 | 31 | 64 | 30 | — | — | — | — | — |
| 2019–20 | Flint Firebirds | OHL | 55 | 17 | 16 | 33 | 36 | — | — | — | — | — |
| 2020–21 | EHC Olten | SL | 34 | 7 | 9 | 16 | 64 | 4 | 1 | 1 | 2 | 0 |
| 2021–22 | Flint Firebirds | OHL | 66 | 50 | 47 | 97 | 65 | 19 | 9 | 15 | 24 | 18 |
| 2022–23 | Flint Firebirds | OHL | 16 | 11 | 13 | 24 | 31 | — | — | — | — | — |
| 2022–23 | Peterborough Petes | OHL | 40 | 18 | 25 | 43 | 48 | 23 | 8 | 17 | 25 | 18 |
| 2023–24 | Hartford Wolf Pack | AHL | 67 | 21 | 28 | 49 | 65 | 10 | 1 | 4 | 5 | 6 |
| 2023–24 | New York Rangers | NHL | 3 | 0 | 0 | 0 | 0 | — | — | — | — | — |
| 2024–25 | Hartford Wolf Pack | AHL | 27 | 12 | 8 | 20 | 35 | — | — | — | — | — |
| 2024–25 | New York Rangers | NHL | 22 | 0 | 2 | 2 | 2 | — | — | — | — | — |
| 2025–26 | New York Rangers | NHL | 17 | 1 | 0 | 1 | 11 | — | — | — | — | — |
| 2025–26 | Hartford Wolf Pack | AHL | 26 | 8 | 8 | 16 | 49 | — | — | — | — | — |
| 2025–26 | Calgary Wranglers | AHL | 14 | 1 | 6 | 7 | 13 | — | — | — | — | — |
| 2025–26 | Calgary Flames | NHL | 2 | 1 | 1 | 2 | 0 | — | — | — | — | — |
| NHL totals | | | 44 | 2 | 3 | 5 | 13 | — | — | — | — | — |

=== International ===
| Year | Team | Event | Result | GP | G | A | Pts | PIM |
|---|---|---|---|---|---|---|---|---|
| 2019 | Canada Black | U17 | 8th | 5 | 3 | 3 | 6 | 2 |
| 2021 | Canada | U18 | 1st place, gold medalist(s) | 7 | 3 | 3 | 6 | 6 |
| 2022 | Canada | WJC | 1st place, gold medalist(s) | 6 | 2 | 4 | 6 | 2 |
| 2023 | Canada | WJC | 1st place, gold medalist(s) | 7 | 2 | 4 | 6 | 0 |
| Junior totals | | | | 25 | 10 | 14 | 24 | 10 |

== Awards and honours ==
| Award | Year | Ref |
OHL
| First All-Rookie Team | 2020 | |
| First All-Star Team | 2022 | |
| Third All-Star Team | 2023 | |
| J. Ross Robertson Cup champion | 2023 | |

Awards and achievements
| Preceded by Braden Schneider | New York Rangers first-round draft pick 2021 | Succeeded by Gabe Perreault |
