= Chase Stillman =

American-born Canadian ice hockey player

- Born: March 19, 2003 (age 23) St. Louis, Missouri, U.S.
- Height: 6 ft 1 in (185 cm)
- Weight: 183 lb (83 kg; 13 st 1 lb)
- Position: Right wing
- Shoots: Right
- NHL team (P) Cur. team: Detroit Red Wings; Grand Rapids Griffins (AHL)
- NHL draft: 29th overall, 2021; New Jersey Devils
- Playing career: 2023–present

Chase Stillman (born March 19, 2003) is an American-born Canadian professional ice hockey right winger currently playing for the Grand Rapids Griffins of the American Hockey League (AHL) while under contract to the Detroit Red Wings of the National Hockey League (NHL).

== Early life ==
Stillman was born in St. Louis when his father, Cory was a member of the St. Louis Blues and grew up in Peterborough, Ontario after his father's career ended.

== Playing career ==
Stillman played major midget hockey within the Sudbury region before he was selected by the Sudbury Wolves, in the second round, 25th overall, of the 2019 OHL Priority Selection. In his first season of major junior hockey with the Wolves in 2019–20, Stillman showed offensive potential in recording 13 goals and 34 points through 58 games and was subsequently named to the OHL First All-Rookie Team.

With the COVID-19 pandemic suspending and later cancelling the 2020–21 season, to continue his development, Stillman joined the junior ranks of Danish club Esbjerg Energy. Producing 16 points through only 8 games at the under-20 level, Stillman was later drafted by New Jersey Devils in the first round of the 2021 NHL entry draft with the 29th overall selection. He was later signed to a three-year, entry-level contract with the Devils on August 21, 2021.

Returning to the OHL for the commencement of the 2021–22 season, Stillman, as an alternate captain, notched 20 points through 24 appearances. On January 10, 2022, Stillman was traded by the Wolves to the Peterborough Petes in exchange for Alex Pharand and five draft picks. Through the second half of the campaign, Stillman contributed with 10 goals and 29 points in 35 regular season games. After a first-round playoff defeat, Stillman was reassigned by the Devils to join their American Hockey League (AHL) affiliate, the Utica Comets for their playoff run on May 1, 2022. He ultimately did not play for Utica that year.

Stillman returned to the Petes for the 2022–23 season, and scored 48 points in 59 games, a similar per-game rate to his previous season.

Stillman turned professional full-time in 2023, joining Utica for the 2023–24 season. He scored his first professional goal on October 28, 2023, in a game against the Rochester Americans, for whom his brother was playing. Stillman would go on to add a second goal in the 5–4 Comets loss. He scored his first professional hat trick on February 25, 2024, in a 5–2 victory over the Syracuse Crunch. He finished his first AHL season with 14 goals and 24 points in 54 games.

During the 2024–25 season, Stillman was recalled by the Devils from the Comets, however he remained a healthy scratch through his tenure with the Devils. At the NHL trade deadline on March 7, 2025, Stillman was dealt by the Devils alongside the rights to prospect Max Graham and a third-round pick in 2027 to the Pittsburgh Penguins in exchange for Cody Glass and Jonathan Gruden.

On July 13, 2025, Stillman, along with a 4th-round pick in the 2027 NHL entry draft, was traded by the Penguins to the Vancouver Canucks in exchange for 2025 Calder Cup MVP goaltender Artūrs Šilovs. In the 2025–26 season, Stillman played exclusively with AHL affiliate, the Abbotsford Canucks, contributing with 3 goals and 9 points through 24 appearances.

As a pending restricted free agent, Stillman was not tendered a qualifying offer by the Canucks and was released as a free agent. He was signed to a one-year, two-way contract with the Detroit Red Wings for the 2026–27 season on July 4, 2026.

== Personal life ==
His father, Cory Stillman, and his grandfather, Bud Stefanski, were NHL forwards; his brother Riley Stillman is a professional ice hockey defenceman.

== Career statistics ==
=== Regular season and playoffs ===
			Regular season					Playoffs
Season	Team	League	GP	G	A	Pts	PIM	GP	G	A	Pts	PIM
2018–19	Rayside-Balfour Canadians	NOJHL	8	6	2	8	0	5	1	1	2	2
2019–20	Sudbury Wolves	OHL	58	13	21	34	63	—	—	—	—	—
2020–21	Esbjerg U20	DEN U20	8	9	7	16	43	—	—	—	—	—
2021–22	Sudbury Wolves	OHL	24	9	11	20	27	—	—	—	—	—
2021–22	Peterborough Petes	OHL	35	10	19	29	37	4	0	1	1	10
2022–23	Peterborough Petes	OHL	59	19	29	48	77	21	4	9	13	21
2023–24	Utica Comets	AHL	54	14	10	24	72	—	—	—	—	—
2024–25	Utica Comets	AHL	46	3	6	9	26	—	—	—	—	—
2024–25	Wilkes-Barre/Scranton Penguins	AHL	19	1	2	3	28	2	0	0	0	0
2025–26	Abbotsford Canucks	AHL	24	3	6	9	48	—	—	—	—	—
AHL totals			143	21	24	45	174	2	0	0	0	0

=== International ===
Year	Team	Event	Result	GP	G	A	Pts	PIM
2019	Canada White	U17	4th	6	1	3	4	4
2021	Canada	U18	1st place, gold medalist(s)	7	2	2	4	4
Junior totals				13	3	5	8	8

Awards and achievements
Preceded by Luke Hughes	New Jersey Devils first-round draft pick 2021	Succeeded by Šimon Nemec
