= Luca Pinelli (ice hockey) =

Canadian ice hockey player (born 2005)

- Born: April 5, 2005 (age 21) Hamilton, Ontario, Canada
- Height: 5 ft 9 in (175 cm)
- Weight: 176 lb (80 kg; 12 st 8 lb)
- Position: Centre
- Shoots: Left
- NHL team (P) Cur. team: Columbus Blue Jackets; Cleveland Monsters (AHL)
- NHL draft: 114th overall, 2023; Columbus Blue Jackets
- Playing career: 2025–present

Luca Pinelli (born April 5, 2005) is a Canadian professional ice hockey centre for the Cleveland Monsters of the American Hockey League (AHL) while under contract as a prospect to the Columbus Blue Jackets of the National Hockey League (NHL).

== Playing career ==
Pinelli played major junior hockey with the Ottawa 67's in the Ontario Hockey League (OHL) before he was selected by the Columbus Blue Jackets in the fourth round, 114th overall, of the 2023 NHL entry draft.

After completion of his third season with the 67's, in which he served as captain and recorded 48 goals and 34 assists for 82 points in 68 appearances and ranked third in the OHL in goals, Pinelli was signed by the Blue Jackets to a three-year, entry-level contract on April 24, 2024.

== Career statistics ==
=== Regular season and playoffs ===
			Regular season					Playoffs
Season	Team	League	GP	G	A	Pts	PIM	GP	G	A	Pts	PIM
2021–22	Ottawa 67's	OHL	59	14	22	36	42	4	2	2	4	2
2022–23	Ottawa 67's	OHL	67	29	34	63	60	11	7	11	18	6
2023–24	Ottawa 67's	OHL	68	48	34	82	44	10	5	2	7	13
2024–25	Ottawa 67's	OHL	52	37	34	71	63	—	—	—	—	—
2024–25	Cleveland Monsters	AHL	3	0	2	2	4	6	2	2	4	4
2025–26	Cleveland Monsters	AHL	68	14	32	46	66	9	1	2	3	12
2025–26	Columbus Blue Jackets	NHL	3	0	0	0	0	—	—	—	—	—
NHL totals			3	0	0	0	0	—	—	—	—	—

=== International ===
Year	Team	Event	Result	GP	G	A	Pts	PIM
2025	Canada	WJC	5th	5	1	1	2	8
Junior totals				5	1	1	2	8
