= Tucker Robertson =

Canadian ice hockey player (born 2003)

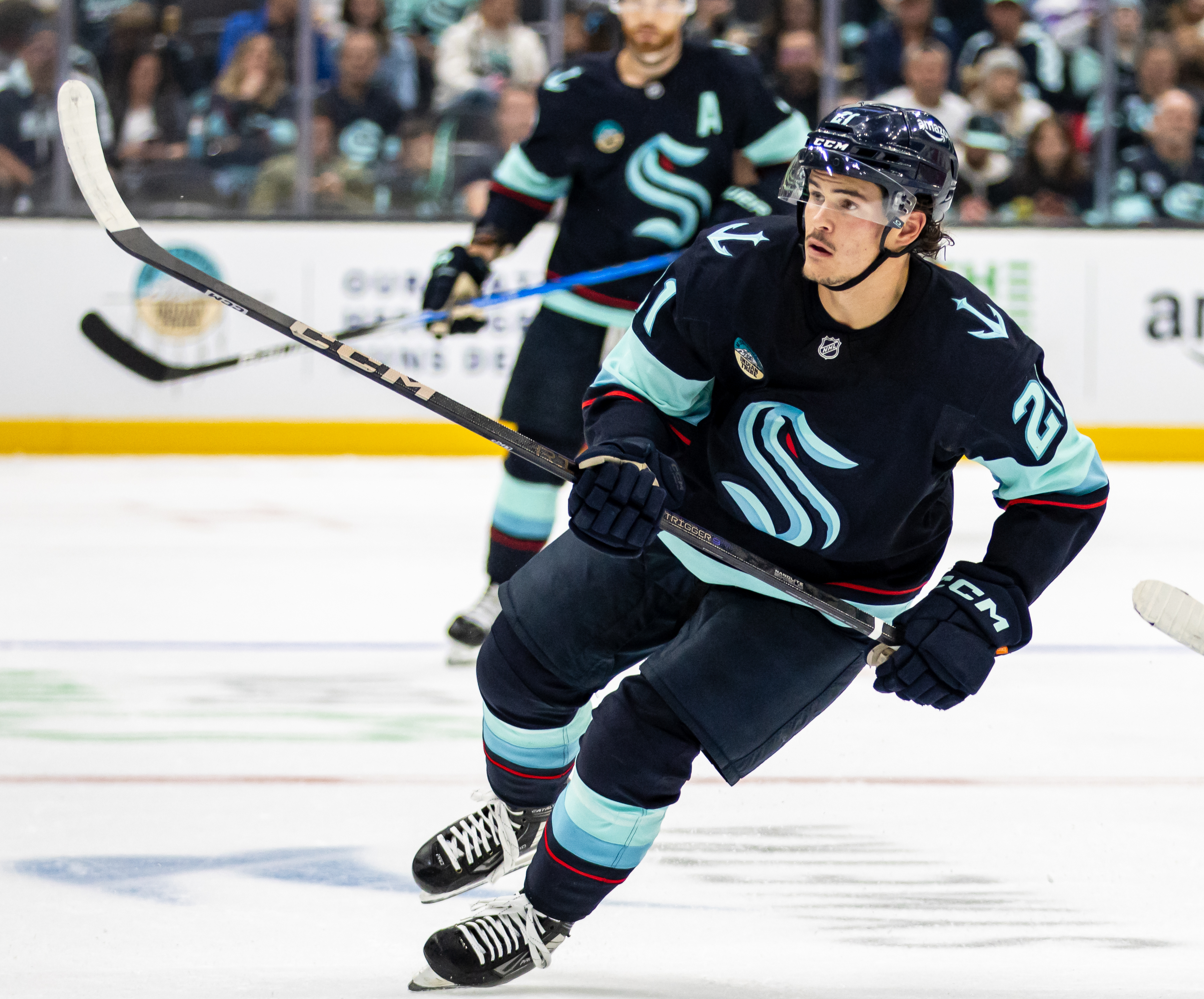
- Robertson with the Seattle Kraken in 2024
- Born: June 22, 2003 (age 23) Toronto, Ontario, Canada
- Height: 5 ft 10 in (178 cm)
- Weight: 190 lb (86 kg; 13 st 8 lb)
- Position: Forward
- Shoots: Right
- AHL team Former teams: Bakersfield Condors; Coachella Valley Firebirds; Lehigh Valley Phantoms
- NHL draft: 123rd overall, 2022; Seattle Kraken
- Playing career: 2023–present

Tucker Robertson (born June 22, 2003) is a Canadian professional ice hockey forward for the Bakersfield Condors of the American Hockey League (AHL). He was selected in the fourth round (123rd overall) by the Seattle Kraken in the 2022 NHL entry draft.

== Playing career ==
=== Junior ===
Robertson played junior hockey with the Toronto Marlboros of the Greater Toronto Hockey League (GTHL), starting in 2018. He won the OHL Gold Cup with GTHL Blue in 2019.

Robertson was drafted in the 2019 Ontario Hockey League (OHL) Priority Selection in the fourth round (72nd overall) by the Peterborough Petes. In his rookie OHL season, Robertson managed 8 goals and 10 assists for 18 points. In 2021, he was invited to play with the Carolina Hurricanes during the 2021 NHL Prospects Showcase. Robertson was then drafted 123rd overall by the Seattle Kraken in the 2022 NHL entry draft. During the 2022–23 season, Robertson scored 36 goals and notched 54 in 68 games, being the first Pete to record 90 points in a season since the 2002–03 season.

During the 2022–23 season, Robertson was named an alternate captain for the Petes.

=== Professional ===
Robertson signed a three-year, entry-level contract with the Kraken On July 6, 2023. At the start of the 2023–24 season, Robertson was sent down to the Kraken's American Hockey League (AHL) affiliate, the Coachella Valley Firebirds. On November 2, he was sent down to the Firebirds' ECHL affiliate, the Kansas City Mavericks.

On September 4, 2025, the Kraken traded Robertson to the Philadelphia Flyers in exchange for Jon-Randall Avon.

On August 6, 2026, Robertson having left the Flyers organization as a free agent was signed to a one-year AHL contract with the Bakersfield Condors, the primary affiliate to the Edmonton Oilers.

== Career statistics ==
			Regular season					Playoffs
Season	Team	League	GP	G	A	Pts	PIM	GP	G	A	Pts	PIM
2018–19	Toronto Marlboros	GTHL	31	12	20	32	12	—	—	—	—	—
2019–20	Peterborough Petes	OHL	35	17	19	36	20	—	—	—	—	—
2021–22	Peterborough Petes	OHL	68	41	40	81	48	4	3	1	4	9
2022–23	Peterborough Petes	OHL	68	36	54	90	34	23	9	13	22	2
2023–24	Kansas City Mavericks	ECHL	13	4	10	14	2	—	—	—	—	—
2023–24	Coachella Valley Firebirds	AHL	39	6	4	10	16	1	0	0	0	0
2024–25	Coachella Valley Firebirds	AHL	38	4	5	9	13	3	0	0	0	0
2025–26	Lehigh Valley Phantoms	AHL	63	13	15	28	41	—	—	—	—	—
AHL totals			140	23	24	47	70	4	0	0	0	0

== Awards and honors ==
Award	Year	Ref
GTHL
OHL Gold Cup	2018–19	
