= Logan Mailloux =

Canadian ice hockey player (born 2003)

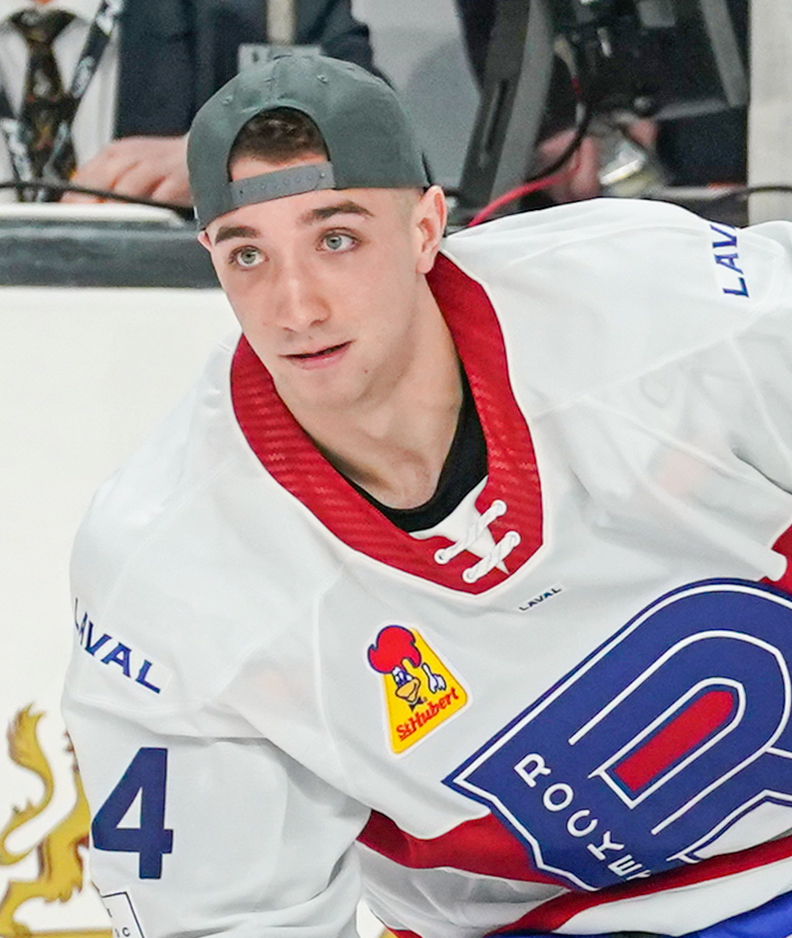
- Mailloux with the Laval Rocket in 2024
- Born: April 15, 2003 (age 23) Windsor, Ontario, Canada
- Height: 6 ft 3 in (191 cm)
- Weight: 212 lb (96 kg; 15 st 2 lb)
- Position: Defence
- Shoots: Right
- NHL team Former teams: St. Louis Blues; Montreal Canadiens
- NHL draft: 31st overall, 2021; Montreal Canadiens
- Playing career: 2023–present

Logan Mailloux (born April 15, 2003) is a Canadian professional ice hockey player who is a defenceman for the St. Louis Blues of the National Hockey League (NHL). He was selected in the first round, 31st overall, by the Montreal Canadiens in the 2021 NHL entry draft under controversial circumstances.

== Playing career ==
=== Early years ===
As a youth, Mailloux played with the Toronto Marlboros of the Greater Toronto Hockey League (GTHL) and participated in the OHL Cup during his midget year, earning selection to the tournament All-Star team.

=== Junior ===
In the 2019–20 season, Mailloux played primarily for the Ontario Hockey League (OHL) London Knights' Junior B affiliate, the London Nationals, scoring 18 goals and 50 assists in a 48-game season that was prematurely shortened by the onset of the COVID-19 pandemic in North America. For his efforts, he earned a number of Greater Ontario Junior Hockey League (GOJHL) awards, including both rookie of the year and defensive player of the year honours. Mailloux also appeared in four games with the Knights during that year's OHL season.

With the pandemic halting the entirety of the 2020–21 OHL season, Mailloux was loaned to SK Lejon in the Swedish Hockeyettan, where he registered 15 points in 19 games. While in Sweden, Mailloux received a 14,300 Swedish krona fine (approximately $1,640.00 USD or $2,000.00 CAD, at the time) for secretly taking photos of a young woman while they were engaged in a sexual act. He then shared the images, along with the identity of the woman, with members of his hockey team.

Prior to the 2021 NHL entry draft, Mailloux renounced himself from proceedings, stating that he did not want to be drafted and instead wanted to focus on his reconciliation and growth. Despite this, the Montreal Canadiens, guided by then general manager Marc Bergevin, selected him with their first-round pick (31st overall). The decision to draft Mailloux proved to be immensely controversial, attracting criticism from Canadian Prime Minister Justin Trudeau, a lifelong Canadiens fan, who announced that he was "deeply disappointed" by the team and characterized the selection as demonstrating a lack of judgment. Isabelle Charest, Quebec's Minister for the Status of Women, expressed that she was also surprised and disappointed by the pick. On July 28, the Canadiens announced that Mailloux would not be invited to participate in the team's annual rookie or main training camp, and that they would "reassess" whether or not he was ready to join the organization later in the year.

On September 2, 2021, the OHL announced that Mailloux had been suspended due to the foregoing incident in Sweden. He was subsequently reinstated by the league on January 1, 2022. Collectively, he played twelve games for London, managing three goals and six assists, before injuring his shoulder in a fight. The injury required surgery and brought his season to a premature end.

Prior to the commencement of the 2022–23 OHL season, Mailloux was signed by the Canadiens to a three-year, entry-level contract on October 5, 2022. Team owner Geoff Molson would later characterize him as "a good kid who made a big mistake and we’re going to help him along and we'll see how it all turns out." Appearing in 59 regular season games, he recorded 25 goals and 28 assists, the former output being the most for any defenceman that year. Mailloux earned praise for both his on-ice play and leadership qualities. He was subsequently named to the OHL Second All-Star Team. Qualifying for the ensuing playoffs, the Knights reached the OHL Finals, but were ultimately defeated by the Peterborough Petes in six games. For his part, Mailloux recorded 24 points across 21 playoff games, setting a team record for a defenceman in a single postseason. Reflecting on being able to play a full season in the OHL for the first time, he said "I played some games here and have wanted to do that since I was 16. Getting that chance has been pretty special."

=== Professional ===
==== Montreal Canadiens ====
Following a meeting with NHL commissioner Gary Bettman, Mailloux was declared eligible to play in the NHL. He participated in the Canadiens' training camp in September 2023. On October 3, the Canadiens assigned him to the Laval Rocket, the team's American Hockey League (AHL) affiliate. Early assessments of his performance praised his offensive acumen, while suggesting that defensive responsibility would be an area for improvement to make the NHL. In January 2024, he was named the team's representative for the 2024 AHL All-Star Classic. Mailloux finished the season with 14 goals and 33 assists in 72 games played, and was named to the league's All-Rookie Team in recognition of his achievements.

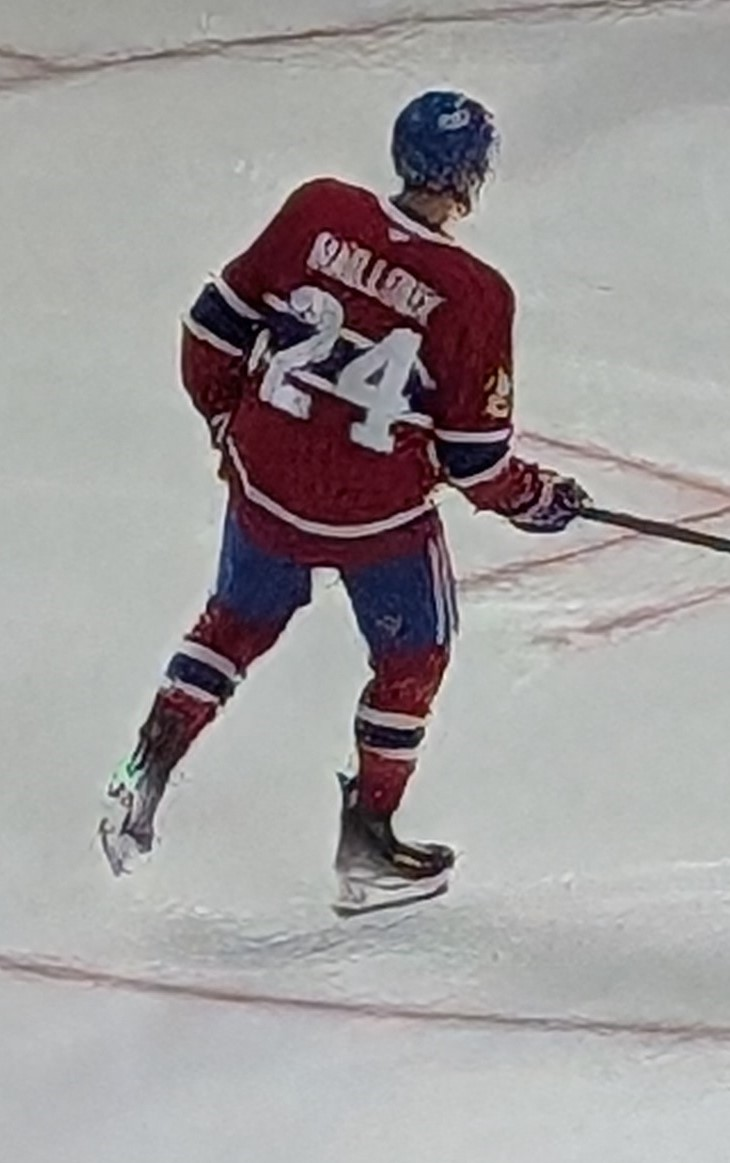
Mailloux with the Montreal Canadiens in September 2024

On April 15, 2024, Mailloux was recalled by the Canadiens prior to their final game of the 2023–24 NHL season. The following day, he made his NHL debut in a 5–4 shootout loss versus the Detroit Red Wings, registering an assist on a goal scored by Alex Newhook. After the Canadiens failed to qualify for the 2024 Stanley Cup playoffs, Mailloux was one of four players reassigned to Laval to end the season.

On October 7, 2024, Mailloux was again reassigned to the Rocket to begin the 2024–25 season. However, after fellow defenceman Kaiden Guhle suffered an injury in a game on October 17, Mailloux was subsequently recalled by the Canadiens, and drew into the lineup on October 19, where he recorded his first NHL career goal in a 4–3 shootout loss to the New York Islanders. After posting three points (1G, 2A) through five games, Mailloux was returned to the AHL ranks on October 30. In January 2025, Mailloux was named to the annual All-Star Classic for the second time in his career. Totaling 12 goals and 21 assists in 63 games for Laval, helping the team to the best regular-season record in the AHL and an appearance in the conference finals, he was selected as part of the league's Top Prospects Team.

==== St. Louis Blues ====
On July 1, 2025, Mailloux's tenure with the Canadiens organization ended as he was traded to the St. Louis Blues in exchange for Zachary Bolduc. After a difficult start to the ensuing 2025–26 season in which he was held scoreless with a plus/minus rating of -12 through nine games with St. Louis, Mailloux was reassigned to the team's AHL affiliate Springfield Thunderbirds on November 9, 2025, prior to being recalled to the NHL ranks two weeks later. In January 2026, he agreed to a one-year extension with the Blues.

After engaging in a fight with Chicago Blackhawks' forward Cole Smith during a preseason game on September 26, 2026, it was announced that Mailloux had undergone surgery on his right hand, sidelining him for a period of eight weeks as a result.

== Career statistics ==
			Regular season					Playoffs
Season	Team	League	GP	G	A	Pts	PIM	GP	G	A	Pts	PIM
2018–19	Toronto Marlboros	GTHL	32	9	11	20	24	—	—	—	—	—
2019–20	London Nationals	GOJHL	48	18	50	68	94	5	2	2	4	24
2019–20	London Knights	OHL	4	0	0	0	2	—	—	—	—	—
2020–21	SK Lejon	Div.1	19	7	8	15	32	—	—	—	—	—
2021–22	London Knights	OHL	12	3	6	9	13	—	—	—	—	—
2022–23	London Knights	OHL	59	25	28	53	77	21	8	16	24	45
2023–24	Laval Rocket	AHL	72	14	33	47	91	—	—	—	—	—
2023–24	Montreal Canadiens	NHL	1	0	1	1	0	—	—	—	—	—
2024–25	Laval Rocket	AHL	63	12	21	33	74	13	2	4	6	28
2024–25	Montreal Canadiens	NHL	7	2	2	4	6	—	—	—	—	—
2025–26	St. Louis Blues	NHL	67	5	8	13	48	—	—	—	—	—
2025–26	Springfield Thunderbirds	AHL	5	2	0	2	2	—	—	—	—	—
NHL totals			75	7	11	18	54	—	—	—	—	—

== Awards and honours ==
Award	Year	Ref
GTHL
Top Prospects Game	2018	
OHL Cup All-Star Team	2019	
GOJHL
Phibbs Incorporated Award	2020	
Roy Bruhlman Memorial Award	2020	
Southland Insurance Award	2020	
Western First All-Star Team	2020	
Western Rookie All-Star Team	2020	
OHA
Top Prospect Award	2020	
OHL
Second All-Star Team	2023	
AHL
All-Star Game	2024, 2025	
All-Rookie Team	2024	
Top Prospects Team	2025	

Awards and achievements
Preceded by Kaiden Guhle	Montreal Canadiens first-round draft pick 2021	Succeeded by Juraj Slafkovský
