= Amadeus Lombardi =

Canadian ice hockey player (born 2003)

- Born: June 5, 2003 (age 23) Newmarket, Ontario, Canada
- Height: 5 ft 11 in (180 cm)
- Weight: 183 lb (83 kg; 13 st 1 lb)
- Position: Centre
- Shoots: Left
- NHL team: New Jersey Devils
- NHL draft: 113th overall, 2022; Detroit Red Wings
- Playing career: 2023–present

Amadeus Lombardi (born June 5, 2003) is a Canadian professional ice hockey player who is a centre for the New Jersey Devils of the National Hockey League (NHL). He was selected by the Detroit Red Wings in the fourth round of the 2022 NHL entry draft.

== Playing career ==
Lombardi was born on June 5, 2003, in Newmarket, Ontario. He was a member of the Toronto Titans AAA program. He scored 48 points in 58 games for the Toronto under-16 program in 2018–19 and then had 37 points in 33 games for the under-18 team in 2019–20. Lombardi was selected by the Flint Firebirds of the Ontario Hockey League (OHL) in the 13th round of the 2020 OHL draft. After not playing in 2020–21, he recorded 59 points in 67 games for the Firebirds during the 2021–22 season.

Lombardi was selected by the Detroit Red Wings in the fourth round, 113th overall, of the 2022 NHL entry draft. He then returned to the Firebirds for a second season, where he appeared in 67 games and placed third in the league with 102 points and sixth with 45 goals. Lombardi signed a three-year, entry-level contract with the Red Wings on December 23, 2022, and made two appearances for the team's American Hockey League (AHL) affiliate, the Grand Rapids Griffins, during the 2022–23 season, posting an assist.

Lombardi then played for the Griffins in the AHL from 2023 to 2026, helping them to the playoffs in three seasons. He tallied five goals and 26 points in 2023–24, 19 goals and 40 points in 2024–25, and 16 goals and 42 points in 2025–26. For being involved in various charitable activities, Lombardi was named the Grand Rapids Griffins Man of the Year for the 2025–26 season. On June 25, 2026, he was traded to the New Jersey Devils for a fourth-round pick in the 2026 NHL entry draft. Lombardi signed a two-year contract with the Devils on July 3, 2026. He made the team's opening lineup for the 2026–27 season.

== Career statistics ==
			Regular season					Playoffs
Season	Team	League	GP	G	A	Pts	PIM	GP	G	A	Pts	PIM
2019–20	Toronto Jr. Canadiens	OJHL	6	0	1	1	0	—	—	—	—	—
2021–22	Flint Firebirds	OHL	67	18	41	59	24	19	7	8	15	6
2022–23	Flint Firebirds	OHL	67	45	57	102	18	7	5	2	7	2
2022–23	Grand Rapids Griffins	AHL	2	0	1	1	0	—	—	—	—	—
2023–24	Grand Rapids Griffins	AHL	70	5	21	26	14	8	1	0	1	2
2024–25	Grand Rapids Griffins	AHL	44	19	21	40	10	3	1	1	2	0
2025–26	Grand Rapids Griffins	AHL	47	16	26	42	22	7	0	3	3	2
AHL totals			163	40	69	109	46	18	2	4	6	4

== Awards and honours ==
Award	Year	Ref
OHL
Second All-Star Team	2023	
