= Brett Brochu =

Canadian ice hockey player

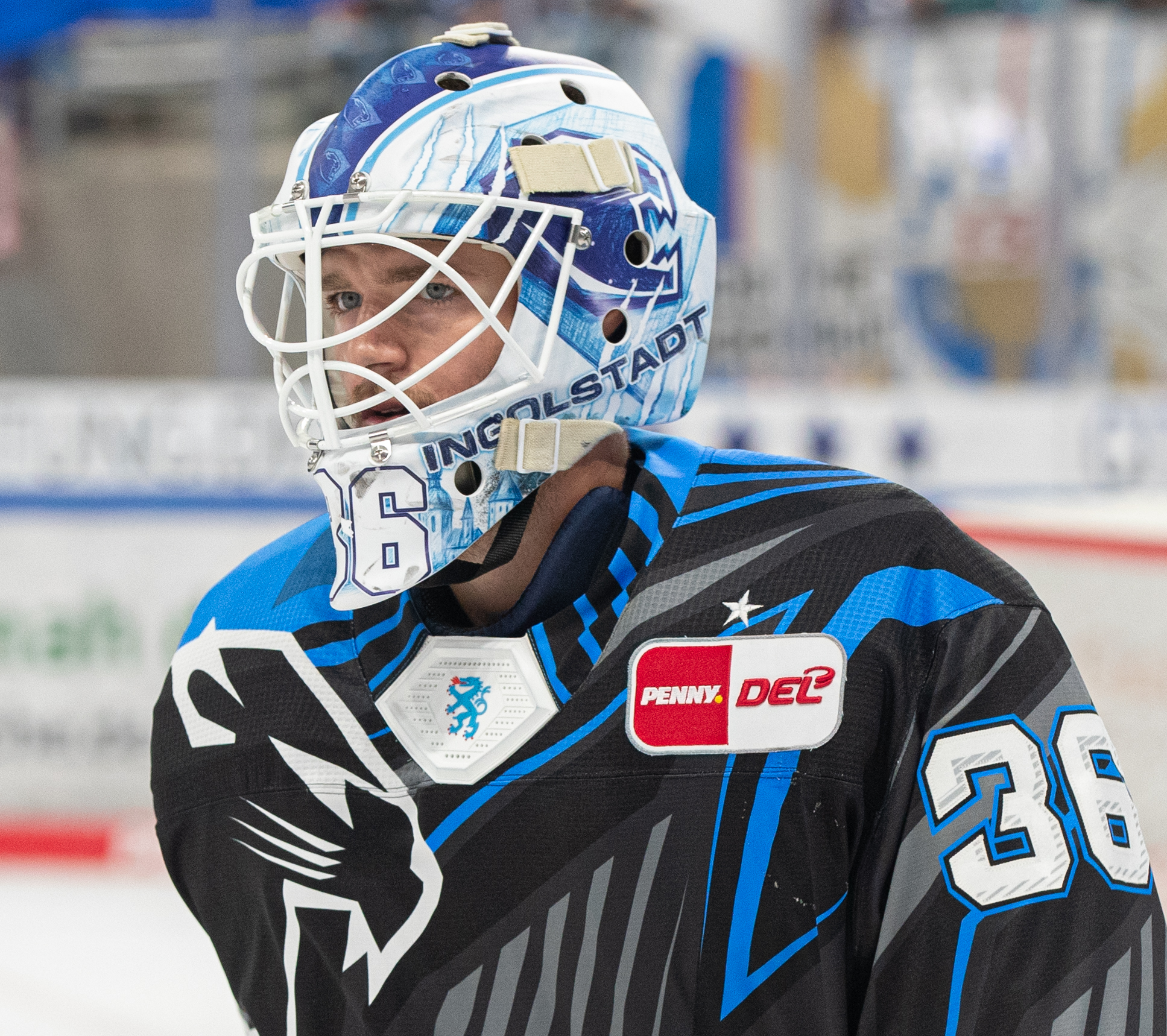
- Brochu in 2025
- Born: September 9, 2002 (age 23) Belle River, Ontario, Canada
- Height: 6 ft 0 in (183 cm)
- Weight: 176 lb (80 kg; 12 st 8 lb)
- Position: Goaltender
- Catches: Left
- DEL team Former teams: ERC Ingolstadt; WBS Penguins; Manitoba Moose; Bakersfield Condors
- NHL draft: Undrafted
- Playing career: 2021–present

Brett Brochu (born September 9, 2002) is a Canadian professional ice hockey goaltender for ERC Ingolstadt of the Deutsche Eishockey Liga (DEL).

== Early life ==
Brett Brochu was born in Belle River, Ontario on September 9, 2002, and spent his youth playing hockey. He also went to Saint-Ambroise for elementary school.

== Playing career ==
Brochu played for the London Knights of the Ontario Hockey League. In 2020 he was awarded the F. W. "Dinty" Moore Trophy.

During the 2020–21 season, when the OHL season was postponed due to the Coronavirus pandemic, Brochu played for the Wilkes-Barre Scranton Penguins of the American Hockey League.

Entering the 2023–24 season, Brochu signed with the Fort Wayne Komets of the ECHL. He made 20 appearances with the Komets, collecting 7 wins and posting a .920 save percentage, he was loaned to the AHL on two separate occasions to the Cleveland Monsters and Manitoba Moose, featuring with the Moose in relief during 1 game.

As a free agent, Brochu secured a one-year AHL contract with the Bakersfield Condors, affiliate to the Edmonton Oilers, on August 1, 2024.

== International play ==
Medal record

Representing Canada

Ice hockey

World Junior Championships
Gold medal – first place	2022 Canada	

Brochu played for Team Canada at the 2022 World Junior Ice Hockey Championships. After winning the starting job for the national team over two other netminders, he made twenty saves against twenty-two shots in his debut game, as Canada won 11–2 over Team Austria. The tournament was cancelled during the group stage on December 29, 2021, due to the Coronavirus pandemic, but Brochu returned to the Canadian team when a replacement tournament was held in August 2022.
