= McMichael (surname) =

McMichael is a Scottish surname meaning "son of Michael".

== Persons with this surname ==
- Alf McMichael (1927–2006), Northern Irish footballer
- Alford L. McMichael (born 1952), American sergeant major
- Andrew McMichael (born 1943), British professor
- Connor McMichael (born 2001), Canadian ice hockey player
- Dan McMichael (c. 1860–1919) Irish-Scottish football manager
- Edward Scott McMichael (1955–2008), American tubist
- Eric McMichael, South Australian architect, designer of the Wondergraph Semaphore in 1920, later the Odeon Star
- Gary McMichael (born 1969), Northern Irish activist and politician
- Greg McMichael (born 1966) American baseball player
- James McMichael (disambiguation), multiple people
- John McMichael (1948–1987), Northern Irish loyalist
- Sir John McMichael (1904–1993), Scottish cardiologist
- Lokelani McMichael, American triathlete
- Mike McMichael (1915–1997), American basketball player
- Molly McMichael (born 1993), American actress
- Morton McMichael (1807–1879), American newspaper publisher and politician
- Randy McMichael (born 1979), American football player
- Richard McMichael (c. 1788 – c. 1843), American politician
- Robert McMichael (1921–2003), Canadian art collector and philanthropist
- Samuel McMichael (1869–1923), Australian cricketer
- Steve McMichael (1957–2025), American football player
