= MacMichael =

MacMichael is a surname of Scottish and Irish origin, deriving from the son of Michael. Notable people with the surname include:

- David MacMichael, Central Intelligence Agency (CIA) analyst
- Harold MacMichael (1882–1969), British colonial administrator
- Kevin MacMichael (1951–2002), Canadian guitarist, songwriter and record producer
- William Macmichael (1783–1839), English physician and medical biographer

== See also ==
- McMichael (disambiguation)
