= Will Cuylle =

Canadian ice hockey player (born 2002)

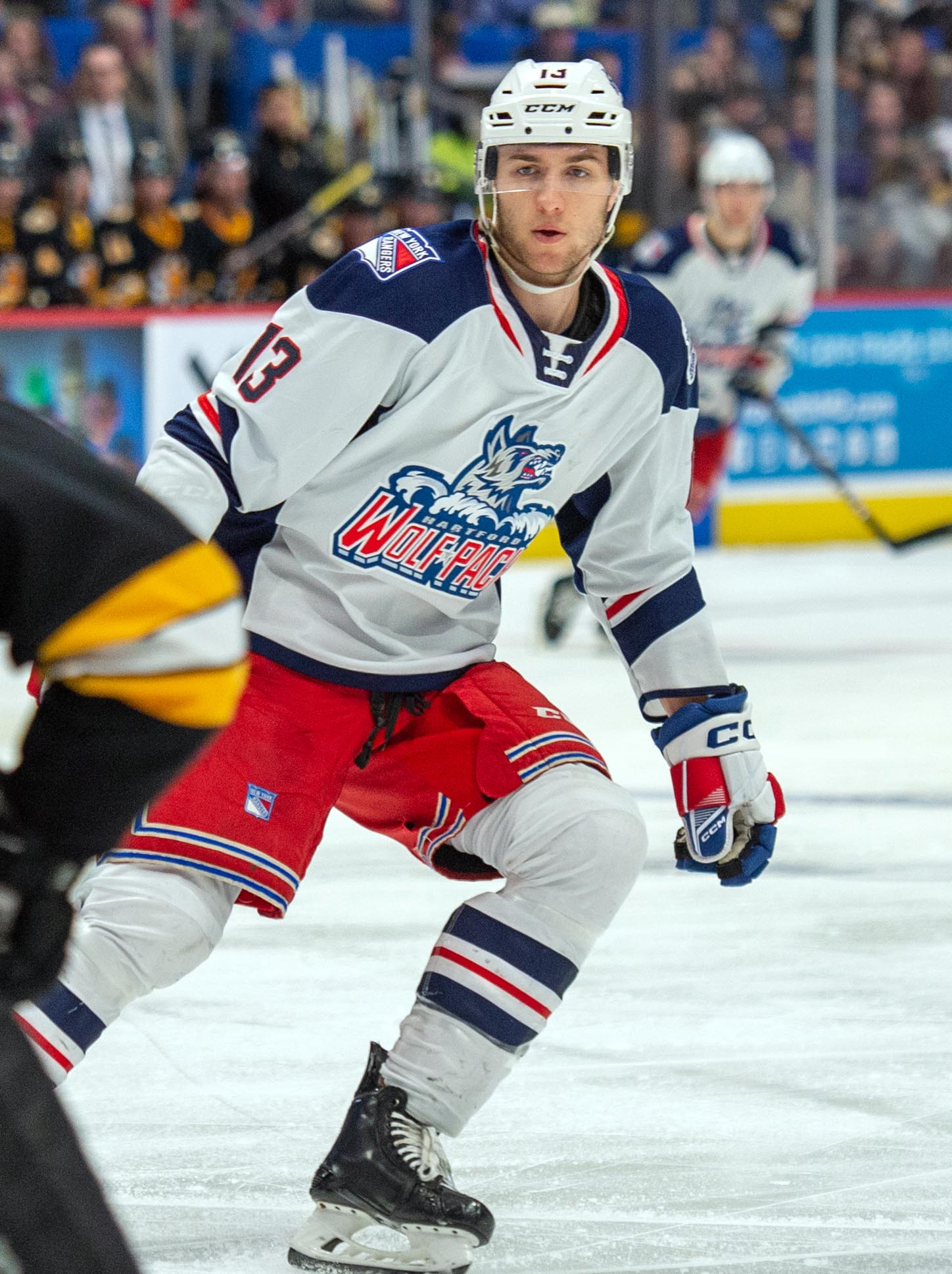
- Cuylle in 2023
- Born: February 5, 2002 (age 24) Toronto, Ontario, Canada
- Height: 6 ft 3 in (191 cm)
- Weight: 212 lb (96 kg; 15 st 2 lb)
- Position: Winger
- Shoots: Left
- NHL team: New York Rangers
- National team: Canada
- NHL draft: 60th overall, 2020; New York Rangers
- Playing career: 2021–present

William Cuylle (/ˈkuːliː/ KOO-lee; born February 5, 2002) is a Canadian professional ice hockey player who is a winger for the New York Rangers of the National Hockey League (NHL). He was drafted 60th overall by the New York Rangers in the second round of the 2020 NHL entry draft.

== Playing career ==
=== Early OHL career ===
Cuylle played junior hockey for the Windsor Spitfires in the Ontario Hockey League (OHL). He was the third overall pick in the 2018 OHL draft by the Peterborough Petes, selected behind only Quinton Byfield, who ended being the second overall selection in the 2020 NHL entry draft, and Evan Vierling, and just ahead of Jamie Drysdale, the sixth overall selection in the 2020 NHL entry draft. Cuylle did not think Peterborough was a good fit for him and he committed to play college hockey for Penn State University. When Peterborough traded his rights to Windsor in exchange for seven OHL draft picks, Cuylle decided to play for Windsor.

In his first season with Windsor, Cuylle scored 26 goals, fourth in the OHL among 16-year-old players, and 15 assists for 41 points. After the season, Cuylle was projected by many analysts to be a likely first round draft pick in the 2020 NHL entry draft. He started slowly in the 2019–20 season and had several eight game goal-scoring droughts. He finished the season with 22 goals and 20 assists, for 42 points, one more than the prior year. He ended up being ranked as the no. 34 draft-eligible North American skater by the NHL Central Scouting Bureau after being ranked no. 22 in mid-season. He was drafted by the New York Rangers in the second round of the 2020 NHL entry draft with the 60th overall pick in the draft.

=== 2020–21 ===
With the OHL shut down for the 2020–21 season due to the COVID-19 pandemic, Cuylle played in 18 games with the Rangers' American Hockey League (AHL) affiliate, the Hartford Wolf Pack, scoring two goals and three assists for a total of five points. On April 19, 2021, Cuylle signed an entry-level contract with the New York Rangers.

=== 2021–22 ===
On October 14, 2021, the Windsor Spitfires announced that Cuylle would be the team captain for the 2021–22 OHL season, his third with the team. Cuylle had a much more productive season with Windsor in 2021–22 than his prior seasons, finishing the regular season with 43 goals and 37 assists in 59 games. As a result he was named the OHL's Second Team All-Star left wing.

=== 2022–23 ===
Cuylle began the 2022–23 season with the Hartford Wolf Pack. He was named to the 2023 AHL All-Star Classic during the season. He was called up to the Rangers on January 24, 2023, after recording 13 goals and 7 assists in his first 39 games with Hartford. He made his NHL debut on January 25, in a game against the Toronto Maple Leafs in his hometown of Toronto. He returned to Hartford after a January 27 game against the Vegas Golden Knights. The Rangers recalled him after the NHL All-Star Game hiatus, but returned him to Hartford after he played two more games when the Rangers acquired forward Vladimir Tarasenko.

=== 2023–24 ===
Cuylle made the Rangers' 2023–24 roster out of training camp. He scored his first NHL goal on October 14, 2023, during a game against the Columbus Blue Jackets.

=== 2025–26 ===
On April 5, 2026, Cuylle scored three goals in an 8–1 win over the Washington Capitals, completing his first hat-trick in an NHL game.

== International play ==
Medal record

Men's ice hockey

Representing Canada

World Junior Championships
Gold medal – first place	2022 Canada	

Cuylle was selected to Canada junior team for the 2022 World Junior Championships. He recorded two assists in two games before the tournament was shut down due to COVID-19 pandemic. Cuylle made his Canada senior team debut at the 2025 World Championship and recorded two goals and two assists in eight games.

== Playing style ==
Cuylle is a power forward who models his game after Washington Capitals forward Tom Wilson, and other power forwards such as Matthew Tkachuk and Jamie Benn. His style has also been compared to former Rangers' forward Brendan Lemieux and to Milan Lucic. According to former Windsor coach Trevor Letowski. Cuylle is "a high-energy, physical guy that can get up and down the ice really well for a big guy — and he can score." He also has a hard shot. According to Letowski, "He can find pockets in the offensive zone — those little, quiet areas — and if he gets it on a stick, especially in juniors, then he can just shoot it past goalies. It doesn't even have to be a perfect shot. It's just heavy, and it's quick."

NHL director of Central Scouting Dan Marr said of Cuylle ahead of the 2020 draft "He brings more of that power-forward type of game and I thought he got away from that last year...He can own the corner, battle for position at the net and play to the strengths of his size and [use] it in a smart way. He's got all the tools."

Before the 2023–24 season, Rangers coach Peter Laviolette compared Cuylle to Wilson, who Laviolette had coached in Washington, saying "I don't know if you want to exactly make that comparison because he's a young kid that’s trying to make it to the NHL, but I do think that those are his traits. He can skate, he can hit, last year he proved that he can fight once in a while, and he has good hockey sense and good hands to be able to score goals, as well." Hockey writer Larry Brooks said of Cuylle that "He plays in straight lines. He arrives at the puck in ill humor."

== Career statistics ==
=== Regular season and playoffs ===
			Regular season					Playoffs
Season	Team	League	GP	G	A	Pts	PIM	GP	G	A	Pts	PIM
2018–19	Windsor Spitfires	OHL	63	26	15	41	50	4	2	1	3	6
2019–20	Windsor Spitfires	OHL	62	22	20	42	37	—	—	—	—	—
2020–21	Hartford Wolf Pack	AHL	18	2	3	5	35	—	—	—	—	—
2021–22	Windsor Spitfires	OHL	59	43	37	80	48	25	15	16	31	30
2022–23	Hartford Wolf Pack	AHL	69	25	20	45	59	9	1	2	3	2
2022–23	New York Rangers	NHL	4	0	0	0	10	—	—	—	—	—
2023–24	New York Rangers	NHL	81	13	8	21	56	16	1	1	2	8
2024–25	New York Rangers	NHL	82	20	25	45	42	—	—	—	—	—
2025–26	New York Rangers	NHL	82	20	18	38	65	—	—	—	—	—
NHL totals			249	53	51	104	173	16	1	1	2	8

=== International ===
Year	Team	Event	Result	GP	G	A	Pts	PIM
2019	Canada	HG18	2nd place, silver medalist(s)	5	2	1	3	0
2022	Canada	WJC	1st place, gold medalist(s)	7	2	2	4	25
2025	Canada	WC	5th	8	2	2	4	2
Junior totals				12	4	3	7	25
Senior totals				8	2	2	4	2
