= McMichael =

McMichael may refer to:

- McMichael (surname), list of people with this name
- McMichael Creek, a tributary of Pocono Creek in Pennsylvania
- McMichael Limited, a British manufacturer of radios and televisions
- McMichael, Pennsylvania, a community

== See also ==
- Mick Michael (1922–2016), Australian politician
- Mick Michael (philatelist)
