= Donovan Sebrango =

Canadian ice hockey player (born 2002)

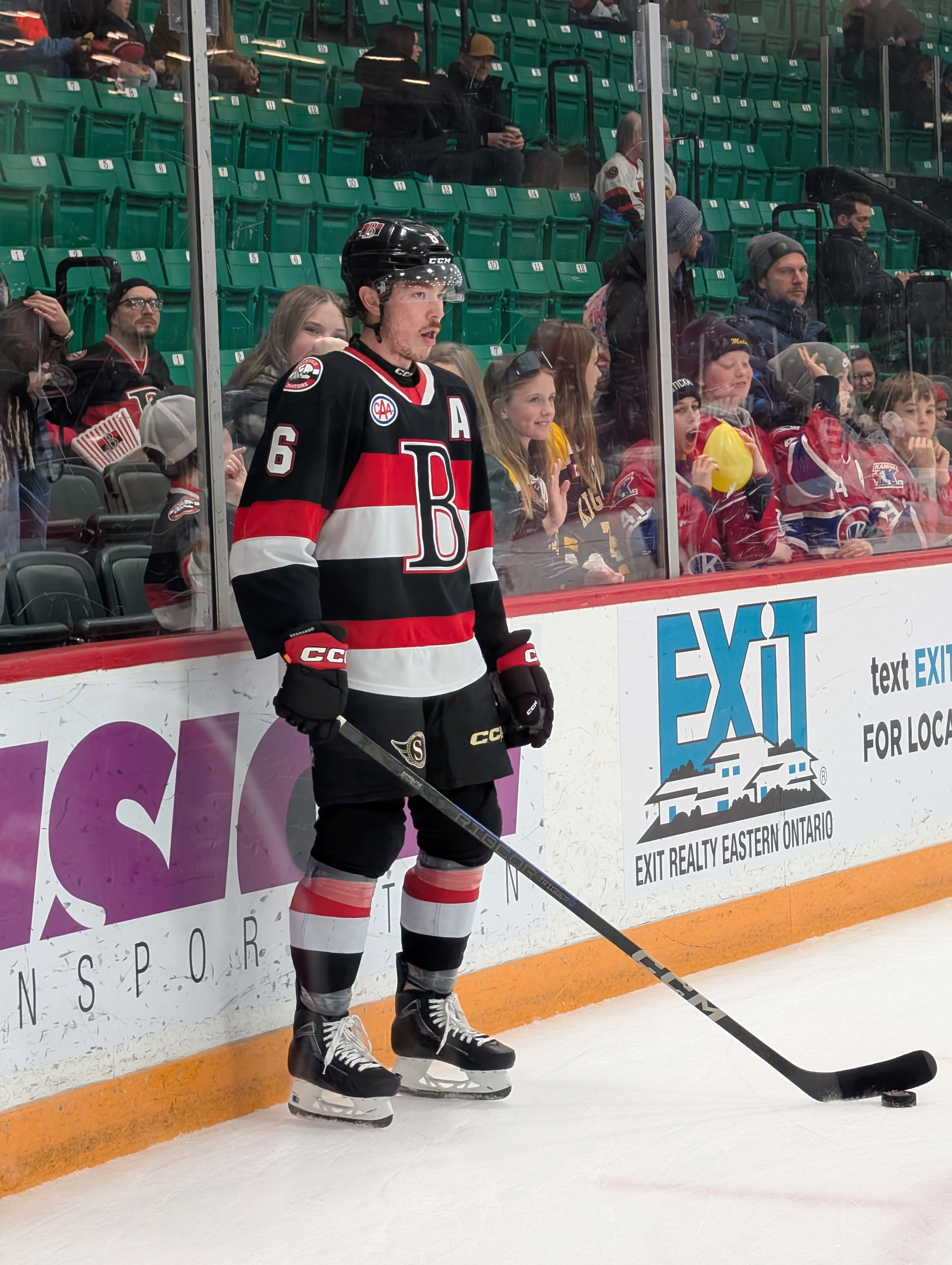
- Sebrango with the Belleville Senators in 2025
- Born: January 12, 2002 (age 24) Ottawa, Ontario, Canada
- Height: 6 ft 1 in (185 cm)
- Weight: 223 lb (101 kg; 15 st 13 lb)
- Position: Defence
- Shoots: Left
- NHL team (P) Cur. team Former teams: Florida Panthers; Charlotte Checkers (AHL): Ottawa Senators
- NHL draft: 63rd overall, 2020; Detroit Red Wings
- Playing career: 2021–present

Donovan Sebrango (born January 12, 2002) is a Canadian professional ice hockey player who is a defenceman for the Charlotte Checkers of the American Hockey League while under contract to the Florida Panthers of the National Hockey League (NHL). Sebrango was selected in the 2020 NHL entry draft by the Detroit Red Wings. He was traded to the Ottawa Senators in 2023 before ever playing for the Red Wings. He made his NHL debut with the Senators in the 2024–25 season and made appearances for them in the 2025–26 season before being claimed on waivers by the Panthers in 2025.

== Playing career ==
=== Amateur ===
While playing minor hockey, Sebrango committed to playing for Boston University of the National Collegiate Athletic Association when he turned 18. However, he was heavily scouted by teams from the Ontario Hockey League (OHL) and renounced his commitment to Boston University while being selected by the Kitchener Rangers in the second round, 40th overall in the 2018 OHL Priority Selection. Sebrango played his OHL rookie season in 2018–19 and quickly established himself in the Rangers' defence corps. His second season with the Rangers in 2019–20 was cut short when the OHL cancelled the season on March 18, 2020, due to the COVID-19 pandemic. He played 119 games with Kitchener, recording 13 goals, 43 assists for 56 points.

=== Professional ===
Sebrango was selected by the Detroit Red Wings of the National Hockey League (NHL) in the third round, 63rd overall, of the 2020 NHL entry draft. With the 2020–21 season delayed due to the pandemic, he signed with HK Levice of the Slovak 2. Liga and played in five games, scoring one goal and three points. He then returned to North America to play for the Red Wings' American Hockey League (AHL) affiliate, the Grand Rapids Griffins, on an amateur tryout contract. He made his North American professional debut with the Griffins on February 11, 2021. He signed a three-year entry-level contract with the Red Wings on March 15, 2021. Sebrango played 31 games with the Griffins that season, recording four points (all assists). He split the 2022–23 season between the Griffins of the AHL and the Toledo Walleye of the ECHL, playing in 39 games with Grand Rapids, scoring four goals and seven points and 23 games with Toledo, adding one goal and 12 points.

On July 9, 2023, as part of the trade that sent forward Alex DeBrincat to the Red Wings, Sebrango was traded to the Ottawa Senators. He was assigned to Ottawa's AHL affiliate, the Belleville Senators for the 2023–24 season, but also spent time with the team's ECHL affiliate Allen Americans. He appeared in 35 games for Belleville, registering seven points (all assists), and four games with Allen, scoring a goal and two points. He was again assigned to Belleville for the 2024–25 season, but recalled to Ottawa on November 26, 2024, to replace the injured Artem Zub. However, he never played for the Senators during his recall and was returned to Belleville on December 3. He was recalled from Belleville again on January 16, 2025, and made his NHL debut that night in a 1–0 loss to the Washington Capitals. He made one more appearance in a loss to the Boston Bruins on January 23 replacing an injured Jake Sanderson before being returned to Belleville on January 25. He finished the season in Belleville, scoring eight goals and 20 points in 50 games.

On September 3, 2025, it was announced the Sebrango had signed a new one-year, two-way contract with the Senators. He opened the 2025–26 season with Ottawa roster, replacing the injured Tyler Kleven and made two appearances. However, upon Kleven's return from injury, Sebrango was placed on waivers and subsequently claimed by the Florida Panthers on October 16. He made his Panthers debut on November 1 in a game against the Dallas Stars, and registered his first two points with the team on November 11, assisting on goals by Brad Marchand and Jesper Boqvist in a 3–2 victory over the Vegas Golden Knights. In 40 games with the Panthers he recorded eight assists.

A restricted free agent in the offseason Sebrango was not offered a qualifying offer and became an unrestricted free agent on July 1, 2026. On July 6, he signed a one-year contract to remain with the Panthers. Sebrango was placed on waivers and was assigned to the Panther's AHL affiliate, the Charlotte Checkers, to begin the 2026–27 season.

== International play ==
Medal record

Ice hockey

Representing Canada

World Junior Championships
Gold medal – first place	2022 Canada	

Sebrango was selected twice to play for the Canadian national junior team for the same tournament. He was selected for the initial team to play for the 2022 World Junior Ice Hockey Championships beginning in December 2021. However, the first tournament, which lasted four days, was cancelled due to the COVID-19 pandemic. The International Ice Hockey Federation elected to play a completely new tournament in August 2022, opting to start fresh and void the results of the games played in December. Sebrango made the team for the new tournament, as some of the players from the December tournament were not included, and was selected to be an alternate captain. Canada went on to win the gold medal in a 3–2 overtime victory over Finland in the final.

== Personal life ==
Sebrango has heritage with both Canada and Cuba. His father, Eduardo, is a former professional Cuban footballer who emigrated to Canada in 1999. He was married to Sebrango's Canadian mother, Kim (Lyttle), with whom he had two children. They divorced when the children were toddlers. Kim and her two children moved to Kingston, Ontario, where she raised them as a single mother. Sebrango began playing hockey in nearby Gananoque as a Tim Hortons Timbit.

== Career statistics ==
			Regular season					Playoffs
Season	Team	League	GP	G	A	Pts	PIM	GP	G	A	Pts	PIM
2018–19	Kitchener Rangers	OHL	62	7	19	26	54	4	0	0	0	2
2019–20	Kitchener Rangers	OHL	56	6	24	30	33	—	—	—	—	—
2020–21	HK Levice	2HL	5	1	2	3	50	—	—	—	—	—
2020–21	Grand Rapids Griffins	AHL	31	0	4	4	18	—	—	—	—	—
2021–22	Grand Rapids Griffins	AHL	65	1	6	7	23	—	—	—	—	—
2022–23	Grand Rapids Griffins	AHL	39	4	3	7	19	—	—	—	—	—
2022–23	Toledo Walleye	ECHL	23	1	11	12	6	13	1	1	2	12
2023–24	Belleville Senators	AHL	35	0	7	7	65	7	2	1	3	12
2023–24	Allen Americans	ECHL	4	1	1	2	0	—	—	—	—	—
2024–25	Belleville Senators	AHL	50	8	12	20	79	—	—	—	—	—
2024–25	Ottawa Senators	NHL	2	0	0	0	0	—	—	—	—	—
2025–26	Ottawa Senators	NHL	2	0	0	0	5	—	—	—	—	—
2025–26	Florida Panthers	NHL	40	0	8	8	63	—	—	—	—	—
NHL totals			44	0	8	8	68	—	—	—	—	—
