= Tyson Foerster =

Canadian ice hockey player (born 2002)

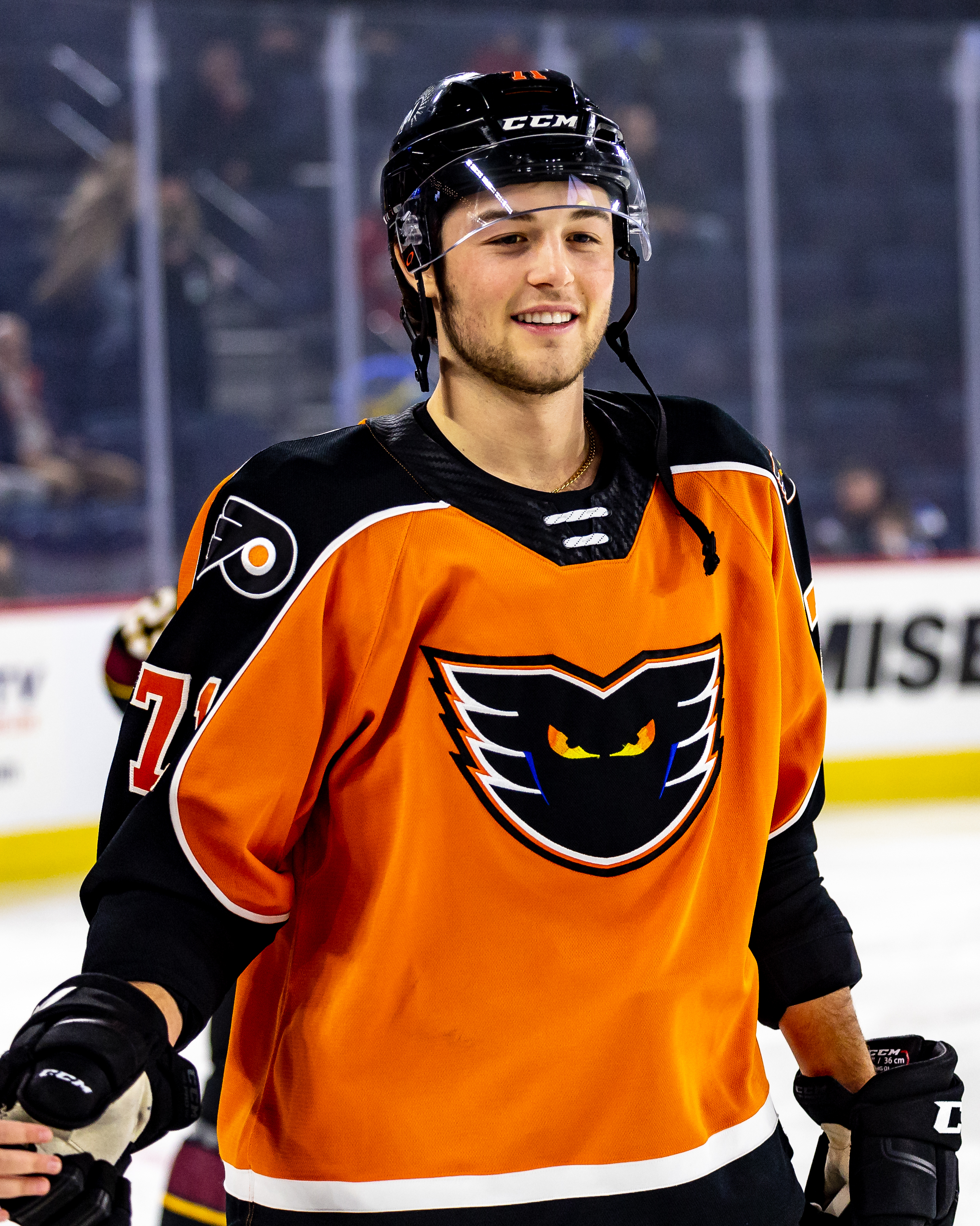
- Foerster with the Lehigh Valley Phantoms in 2023
- Born: January 18, 2002 (age 24) Alliston, Ontario, Canada
- Height: 6 ft 2 in (188 cm)
- Weight: 215 lb (98 kg; 15 st 5 lb)
- Position: Right wing
- Shoots: Right
- NHL team: Philadelphia Flyers
- National team: Canada
- NHL draft: 23rd overall, 2020; Philadelphia Flyers
- Playing career: 2021–present

Tyson Foerster (born January 18, 2002) is a Canadian professional ice hockey player who is a right winger for the Philadelphia Flyers of the National Hockey League (NHL). The Flyers selected him in the first round, 23rd overall, of the 2020 NHL entry draft.

== Early life ==
Foerster was born January 18, 2002, in Alliston, Ontario, to Glen and Sheri Foerster. He was inspired to play ice hockey by his older brother Dawson, and Glen Foerster built a basement floor hockey rink for his children. Foerster would also assist his grandparents with their sheep farm, building his strength by stacking bales of hay. In his final season of minor ice hockey with the Barrie Jr. Colts, Foerster had 20 goals and 61 points in 34 games. He also appeared in five OHL Cup games, recording five goals and nine points.

== Playing career ==
=== Junior ===
The Barrie Colts of the Ontario Hockey League (OHL) selected Foerster in the third round, 55th overall, of the 2018 OHL Priority Selection, and he signed with the team that September. He scored his first junior ice hockey goal on October 7, as part of Barrie's 4–2 win over the Kingston Frontenacs. During his second season, Foerster recorded six points against the Mississauga Steelheads setting of a point streak through 13 straight games which included six consecutive multi-point efforts. National Hockey League (NHL) scouts noted he showed stark improvement in play and goal scoring, setting career-highs in both goals and assists. Foerster described himself as a "shoot first player with a strong playmaking ability."

=== Professional ===
==== Philadelphia Flyers ====
As a result of his play, Foerster rose from the 41st ranking by the NHL Central Scouting Bureau in January to the 21st by April. He was invited to the 2020 CHL Top Prospects Game where he scored two goals and was named Player of the Game for Team White. He was eventually drafted 23rd overall by the Philadelphia Flyers in the 2020 NHL entry draft and signed an entry-level contract with the team on October 14, 2020.

With the hiatus of the OHL due to the ongoing pandemic, Foerster attended the Flyers training camp in preparation for the 2020–21 season. On January 13, 2021, he was reassigned by the Flyers to AHL affiliate, the Lehigh Valley Phantoms training camp, in order to continue his development. In his first game with the Phantoms, on February 6, 2021, Foerster had an awkward collision with a Hershey Bears player that resulted in a broken tibia for Foerster. He was expected to miss 3-4 weeks.

On March 9, 2023, Foerster made his NHL debut with the Flyers against the Carolina Hurricanes, where he played nearly fourteen minutes, blocked three shots, and had two shots. He had his first assist on March 17 against the Buffalo Sabres, and on the following day, he scored his first NHL goal against the Hurricanes' Frederik Andersen. On March 26, after scoring three goals over a total of eight games played, Foerster was loaned back to the Flyers' AHL affiliate Phantoms.

On July 1, 2026, Foerster signed an eight-year, $56.8 million extension with the Flyers.

== International play ==
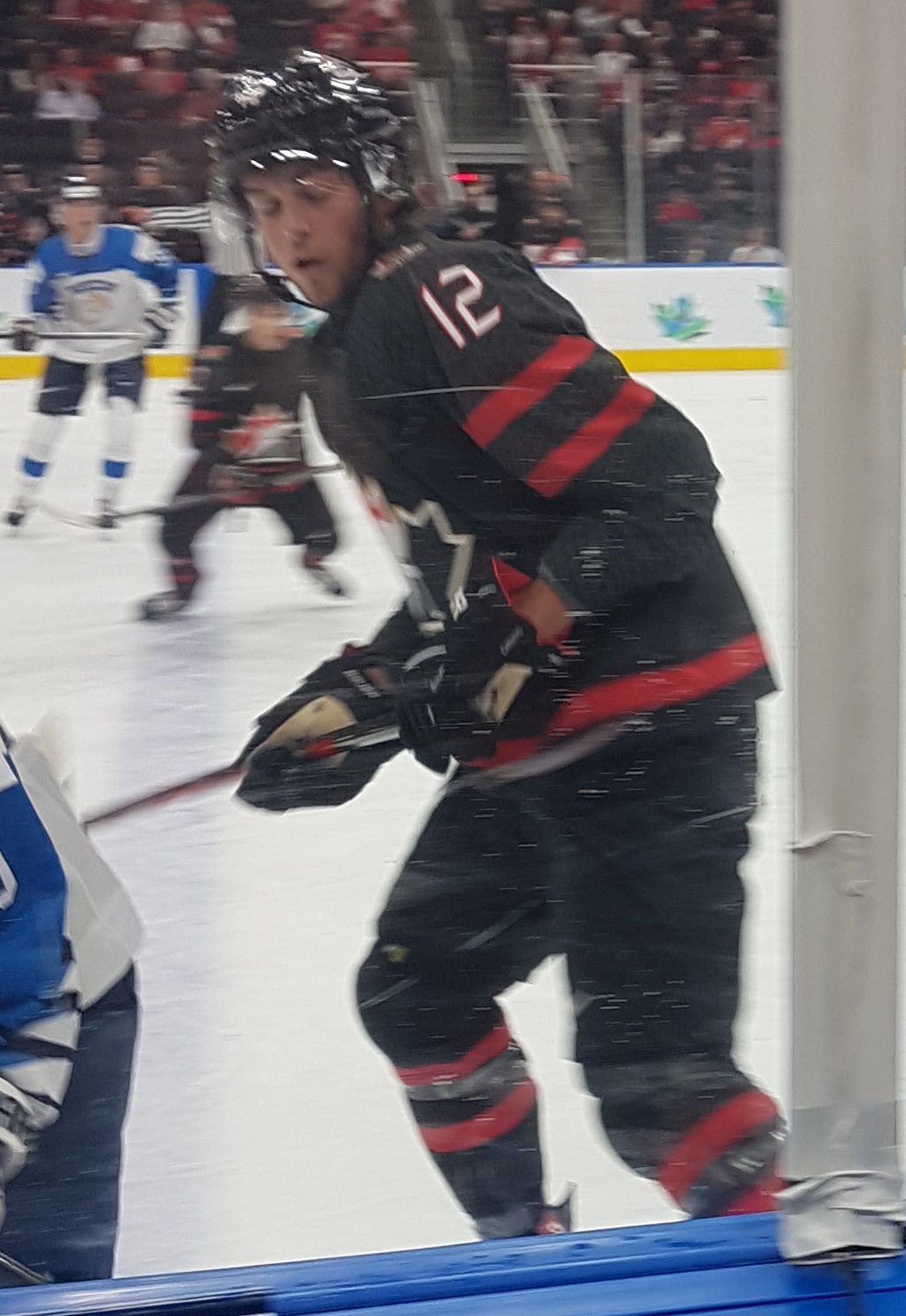
- Foerster at the 2022 World Junior Ice Hockey Championships

Medal record

Representing Canada

Ice hockey

World Junior Championships
Gold medal – first place	2022 Canada	

Foerster was named to Team Canada for the 2022 World Junior Ice Hockey Championships, winning gold.

== Career statistics ==
=== Regular season and playoffs ===
			Regular season					Playoffs
Season	Team	League	GP	G	A	Pts	PIM	GP	G	A	Pts	PIM
2017–18	Stouffville Spirit	OJHL	2	0	0	0	0	—	—	—	—	—
2018–19	Barrie Colts	OHL	64	10	13	23	24	—	—	—	—	—
2019–20	Barrie Colts	OHL	62	36	44	80	53	—	—	—	—	—
2020–21	Lehigh Valley Phantoms	AHL	24	10	7	17	16	—	—	—	—	—
2021–22	Lehigh Valley Phantoms	AHL	9	2	1	3	4	—	—	—	—	—
2021–22	Barrie Colts	OHL	13	6	5	11	6	6	1	3	4	4
2022–23	Lehigh Valley Phantoms	AHL	66	20	28	48	59	3	2	1	3	0
2022–23	Philadelphia Flyers	NHL	8	3	4	7	8	—	—	—	—	—
2023–24	Philadelphia Flyers	NHL	77	20	13	33	32	—	—	—	—	—
2024–25	Philadelphia Flyers	NHL	81	25	18	43	49	—	—	—	—	—
2025–26	Philadelphia Flyers	NHL	29	13	4	17	22	10	1	0	1	6
NHL totals			195	61	39	100	111	10	1	0	1	6

=== International ===
Year	Team	Event	Result	GP	G	A	Pts	PIM
2022	Canada	WJC	1st place, gold medalist(s)	7	3	3	6	0
2025	Canada	WC	5th	7	2	1	3	2
Junior totals				7	3	3	6	0
Senior totals				7	2	1	3	2

Awards and achievements
Preceded by Cam York	Philadelphia Flyers' first-round draft pick 2020	Succeeded by Cutter Gauthier
