= Jacob Perreault =

Canadian ice hockey player (born 2002)

- Born: April 15, 2002 (age 24) Montreal, Quebec, Canada
- Height: 5 ft 11 in (180 cm)
- Weight: 185 lb (84 kg; 13 st 3 lb)
- Position: Right wing
- Shoots: Right
- ECHL team Former teams: Indy Fuel; Anaheim Ducks
- NHL draft: 27th overall, 2020; Anaheim Ducks
- Playing career: 2021–present

Jacob Perreault (born April 15, 2002) is a Canadian professional ice hockey player who is a right winger for the Indy Fuel of the ECHL. He was selected in the first round, 27th overall, of the 2020 NHL entry draft by the Anaheim Ducks.

== Playing career ==
On November 6, 2020, Perreault was signed by the Anaheim Ducks to a three-year, entry-level contract. While playing primarily for the Ducks' AHL affiliate San Diego Gulls the next two seasons, he made his National Hockey League (NHL) debut on January 8, 2022 in a 4–1 loss versus the New York Rangers.

On March 7, 2024, Perreault was traded to the Montreal Canadiens in exchange for forward Jan Myšák. He was assigned to Montreal's AHL affiliate, the Laval Rocket, after the trade. Perreault was again assigned to Laval for the beginning of the 2024–25 AHL season. However, due to a nagging injury, he was reassigned to the Trois-Rivières Lions, the Canadiens' ECHL affiliate, on October 23 for conditioning purposes. After appearing in five games with the Lions, Perreault was recalled to Laval on November 6 and was again reassigned to Trois-Rivières one month later on December 6. The same day, he was traded to the Edmonton Oilers in exchange for defenceman Noel Hoefenmayer.

== Personal life ==
Perreault was born on April 15, 2002, in Montreal, while his father, Yanic, was playing for the Montreal Canadiens as a centre. Growing up, Perreault and his siblings Jeremy, Liliane and Gabe all played ice hockey and worked on their shot in the basement of the family home.

== Career statistics ==
=== Regular season and playoffs ===
			Regular season					Playoffs
Season	Team	League	GP	G	A	Pts	PIM	GP	G	A	Pts	PIM
2018–19	Sarnia Sting	OHL	63	30	25	55	54	4	1	1	2	2
2019–20	Sarnia Sting	OHL	57	39	31	70	40	—	—	—	—	—
2020–21	San Diego Gulls	AHL	27	3	14	17	29	—	—	—	—	—
2021–22	San Diego Gulls	AHL	55	14	23	37	62	2	0	1	1	0
2021–22	Anaheim Ducks	NHL	1	0	0	0	0	—	—	—	—	—
2022–23	San Diego Gulls	AHL	48	8	11	19	44	—	—	—	—	—
2023–24	San Diego Gulls	AHL	31	7	11	18	44	—	—	—	—	—
2023–24	Laval Rocket	AHL	13	1	1	2	19	—	—	—	—	—
2024–25	Trois-Rivières Lions	ECHL	5	1	4	5	4	—	—	—	—	—
2024–25	Laval Rocket	AHL	6	0	0	0	4	—	—	—	—	—
2024–25	Bakersfield Condors	AHL	38	3	11	14	37	—	—	—	—	—
2025–26	Maine Mariners	ECHL	39	15	24	39	63	10	1	7	8	6
2025–26	Providence Bruins	AHL	14	3	2	5	0	—	—	—	—	—
NHL totals			1	0	0	0	0	—	—	—	—	—

=== International ===
Year	Team	Event	Result	GP	G	A	Pts	PIM
2018	Canada Red	U17	4th	6	2	0	2	6
Junior totals				6	2	0	2	6

== Awards and honours ==
Award	Year	Ref
OHL
First All-Rookie Team	2019	

Awards and achievements
Preceded by Jamie Drysdale	Anaheim Ducks first-round draft pick 2020	Succeeded by Mason McTavish
