= Nick Robertson (ice hockey) =

American ice hockey player (born 2001)

- Born: September 11, 2001 (age 25) Pasadena, California, U.S.
- Height: 5 ft 9 in (175 cm)
- Weight: 180 lb (82 kg; 12 st 12 lb)
- Position: Left wing
- Shoots: Left
- NHL team Former teams: Pittsburgh Penguins; Toronto Maple Leafs
- NHL draft: 53rd overall, 2019; Toronto Maple Leafs
- Playing career: 2020–present

Nicholas Robertson (born September 11, 2001) is an American professional ice hockey player who is a left winger for the Pittsburgh Penguins of the National Hockey League (NHL). He was selected 53rd overall by the Toronto Maple Leafs in the 2019 NHL entry draft. He made his NHL debut with the Maple Leafs during the 2020 Stanley Cup playoffs, where he had one goal in four games. He is the younger brother of Jason Robertson of the Dallas Stars.

== Playing career ==
=== Major junior ===
Robertson began his hockey career in Toronto with the AAA minor hockey team Toronto Red Wings in the Greater Toronto Hockey League (GTHL). He recorded 18 goals and 18 assists over 32 games for the 2016–17 season while also playing four games with the North York Rangers of the Ontario Junior Hockey League (OJHL). He received attention from the Ontario Hockey League (OHL) and was eventually drafted 17th overall by the Peterborough Petes in the 2017 OHL Draft. He played with the Petes for three seasons, scoring 55 goals and 31 assists for 86 points in his last year before the OHL season was canceled due to the coronavirus pandemic. He became the first Petes player to score 50 goals in a season since Jason Dawe and Mike Harding did in 1992–93. As a result of his successful season, Robertson received the CHL Sportsman of the Year Award and was named to the 2019–20 OHL All-Star Team. He was also selected as the Petes' nominee for the Red Tilson Trophy as OHL MVP.

=== Professional ===
Robertson was drafted by the Toronto Maple Leafs of the National Hockey League (NHL) 53rd overall in the 2019 NHL entry draft and signed an entry-level contract with the team on September 19, 2019. Upon the cancelation of the 2019–20 OHL season, he returned to Los Angeles where he continued to work out before joining the Maple Leafs for their Return to Play initiative. He participated in the Leafs training camp before the 2020 Stanley Cup playoffs and made his NHL debut during qualifying rounds of the playoffs against the Columbus Blue Jackets. Upon making his debut, he became the youngest player on all NHL rosters for the Qualifiers and the youngest ever in the postseason since April 21, 1996, when Jarome Iginla made his professional debut. A few days later, on August 6, in Game 3 of the Qualifiers versus the Blue Jackets, Robertson beat Blue Jackets goaltender Joonas Korpisalo for his first NHL goal in a 4–3 overtime loss. In doing so, he became the third player in franchise history to record a playoff goal before their 19th birthday, the other two being Jack Hamilton in 1943 and Ted Kennedy (1944). Despite Robertson's good play, the Maple Leafs were eliminated in five games by Columbus.

In the following season Robertson was subjected to a series of long-term injuries, suffering a knee injury in his season debut. In the 2021–22 season, he suffered a broken leg, limiting his playing time with both Toronto and the team's American Hockey League (AHL) affiliate, the Toronto Marlies. Robertson began the 2022–23 season with the Marlies, but after scoring two points in two games, he was recalled. Robertson made 15 appearances with the Maple Leafs, registering two goals and five points before suffering a season-ending shoulder injury against the Los Angeles Kings on December 8, 2022, which required surgery.

Robertson attended the Maple Leafs 2023 training camp but was assigned to the Marlies to start the 2023–24 season. He was recalled by the Maple Leafs on November 6, 2023, and made his Maple Leafs season debut that night in a 6–5 win over the Tampa Bay Lightning. He made 56 appearances for the Maple Leafs, scoring 14 goals and 27 points. In the offseason, Robertson requested a trade from the Maple Leafs, but later re-signed with Toronto to a one-year, $875,000 contract on September 10, 2024. He made the Maple Leafs out of training camp, playing on third line with Max Pacioretty and Pontus Holmberg.

On August 2, 2025, Robertson signed a one-year, $1.825 million extension with the Maple Leafs to avoid arbitration.

On July 1, 2026, Robertson was traded to the Pittsburgh Penguins in exchange for a 2028 fourth round draft pick. As a restricted free agent, Robertson was later re-signed to a two-year, $6.5 million contract extension with the Penguins on July 14, 2026.

== Personal life ==
Robertson was born in Pasadena, California, to parents Hugh and Mercedes. His mother was born in Manila, Philippines, and moved to North America as a child where she would meet her Michigan-born husband. Robertson began playing minor hockey while living in Southern California before moving to Michigan at eight years old for better hockey opportunities. Before the move, his parents owned season tickets to the Los Angeles Kings and he would often go to games with his brothers Jason and Michael. His older sister Brianne is also involved in athletics and is a professional martial artist, specializing in jujitsu.

== Career statistics ==
=== Regular season and playoffs ===
| | | | Regular season | | | | | Playoffs |
| Season | Team | League | GP | G | A | Pts | PIM | GP | G | A | Pts | PIM |
|---|---|---|---|---|---|---|---|---|---|---|---|---|
| 2016–17 | North York Rangers | OJHL | 4 | 0 | 3 | 3 | 2 | — | — | — | — | — |
| 2017–18 | Peterborough Petes | OHL | 62 | 15 | 18 | 33 | 14 | — | — | — | — | — |
| 2018–19 | Peterborough Petes | OHL | 54 | 27 | 28 | 55 | 24 | 5 | 1 | 1 | 2 | 2 |
| 2019–20 | Peterborough Petes | OHL | 46 | 55 | 31 | 86 | 40 | — | — | — | — | — |
| 2019–20 | Toronto Maple Leafs | NHL | — | — | — | — | — | 4 | 1 | 0 | 1 | 2 |
| 2020–21 | Toronto Maple Leafs | NHL | 6 | 0 | 1 | 1 | 0 | — | — | — | — | — |
| 2020–21 | Toronto Marlies | AHL | 21 | 5 | 11 | 16 | 12 | — | — | — | — | — |
| 2021–22 | Toronto Marlies | AHL | 28 | 16 | 12 | 28 | 8 | — | — | — | — | — |
| 2021–22 | Toronto Maple Leafs | NHL | 10 | 1 | 0 | 1 | 4 | — | — | — | — | — |
| 2022–23 | Toronto Marlies | AHL | 2 | 1 | 1 | 2 | 2 | — | — | — | — | — |
| 2022–23 | Toronto Maple Leafs | NHL | 15 | 2 | 3 | 5 | 0 | — | — | — | — | — |
| 2023–24 | Toronto Marlies | AHL | 9 | 5 | 6 | 11 | 0 | — | — | — | — | — |
| 2023–24 | Toronto Maple Leafs | NHL | 56 | 14 | 13 | 27 | 4 | 6 | 0 | 0 | 0 | 0 |
| 2024–25 | Toronto Maple Leafs | NHL | 69 | 15 | 7 | 22 | 16 | 3 | 1 | 1 | 2 | 6 |
| 2025–26 | Toronto Maple Leafs | NHL | 78 | 16 | 16 | 32 | 10 | — | — | — | — | — |
| NHL totals | | | 234 | 48 | 40 | 84 | 34 | 13 | 2 | 1 | 3 | 8 |

=== International ===
| Year | Team | Event | Result | GP | G | A | Pts | PIM |
|---|---|---|---|---|---|---|---|---|
| 2018 | United States | HG18 | 4th | 5 | 4 | 1 | 5 | 2 |
| 2020 | United States | WJC | 6th | 5 | 2 | 3 | 5 | 2 |
| Junior totals | | | | 10 | 6 | 4 | 10 | 4 |
