= Mason McTavish =

Canadian ice hockey player (born 2003)

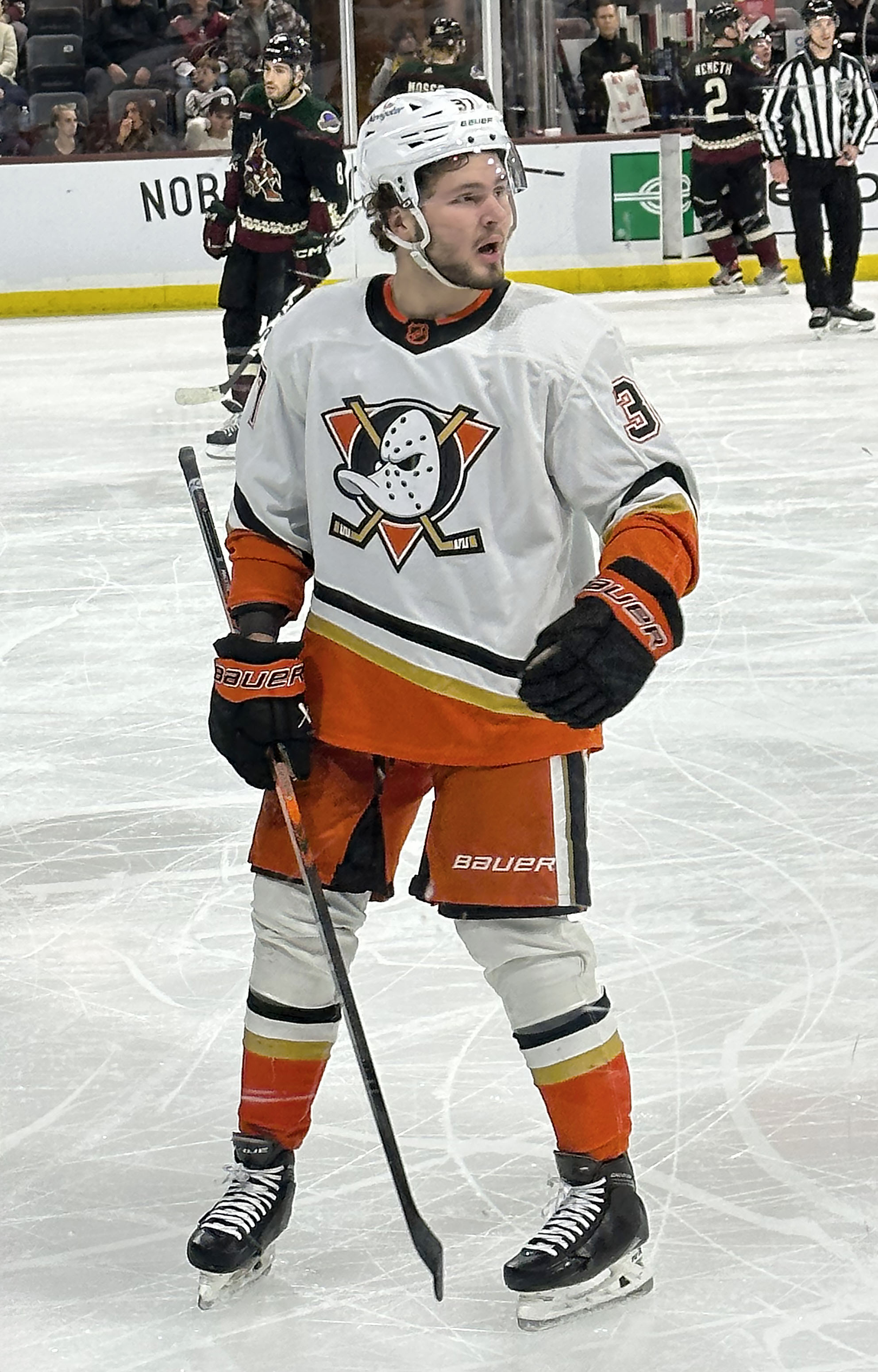
- McTavish with the Anaheim Ducks in 2023
- Born: January 30, 2003 (age 23) Zurich, Switzerland
- Height: 6 ft 1 in (185 cm)
- Weight: 219 lb (99 kg; 15 st 9 lb)
- Position: Centre
- Shoots: Left
- NHL team Former teams: St. Louis Blues; Anaheim Ducks
- National team: Canada
- NHL draft: 3rd overall, 2021; Anaheim Ducks
- Playing career: 2020–present

Mason Dale McTavish (born January 30, 2003) is a Swiss-born Canadian professional ice hockey player who is a centre for the St. Louis Blues of the National Hockey League (NHL). McTavish was selected third overall by the Anaheim Ducks in the 2021 NHL entry draft. He made his NHL debut with the Ducks in 2021. Internationally McTavish played for the Canada national team at the 2022 IIHF World Junior Championships.

== Playing career ==
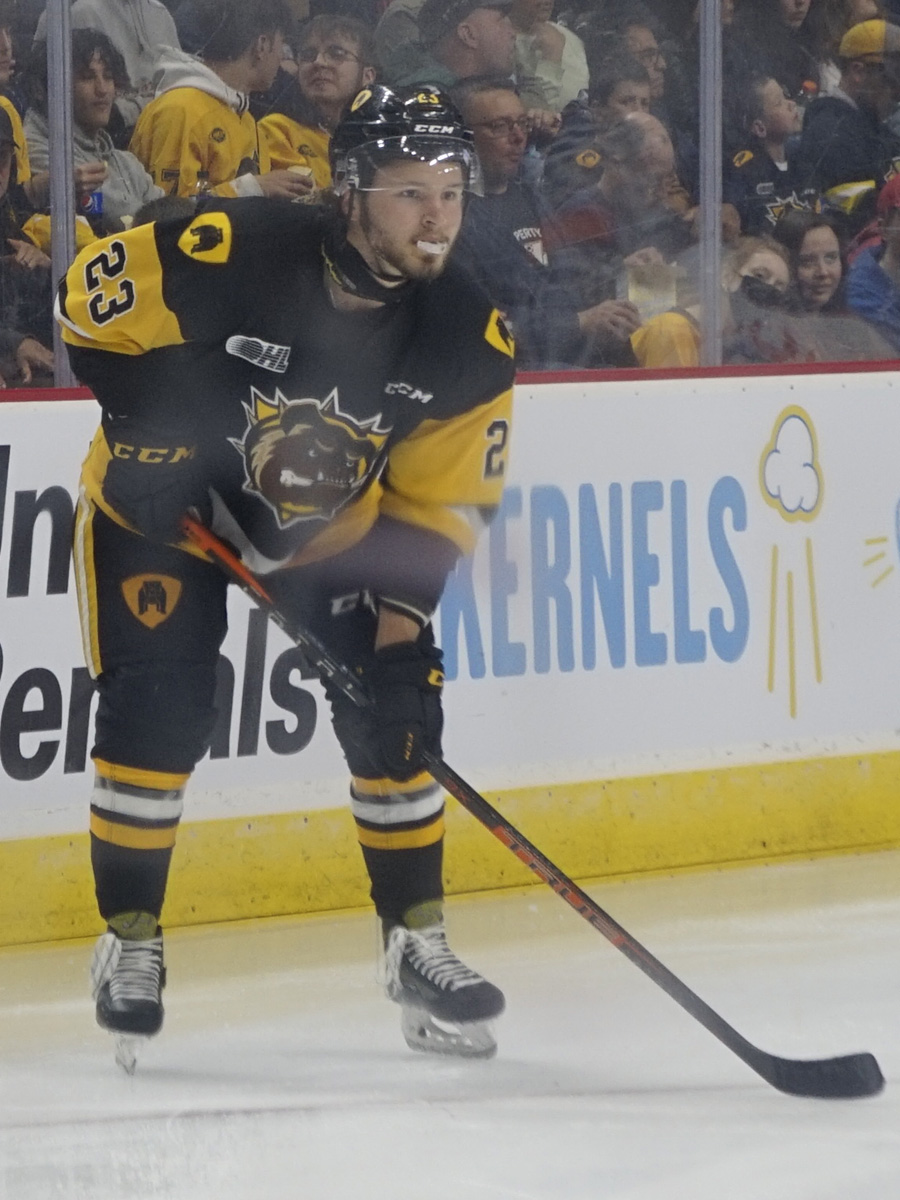
McTavish with the Hamilton Bulldogs in 2022.

McTavish played minor ice hockey for the Pembroke Lumber Kings, where he was coached by his father, Dale McTavish, who also owned the team. He was selected fifth overall in the 2019 OHL Priority Selection by the Peterborough Petes, the same junior team his father played for. In the 2019–20 season, he finished second among under-17 players in goals before the COVID-19 pandemic shut the season down. The following season, with the 2020–21 OHL season suspended due to the pandemic, McTavish returned to Switzerland, though he was unable to get a work visa until he turned 18 years old, eventually joining the Swiss League's EHC Olten on January 29, 2021, where he would play 13 games before returning home to play in the 2021 World U18 Championships, where he served as captain and scored 11 points in seven games as Canada won the gold medal.

=== Anaheim Ducks ===
McTavish was selected third overall by the Anaheim Ducks in the 2021 NHL entry draft. He signed a three-year, entry-level contract with the Ducks on August 13, 2021. He was initially scheduled to not play in the team's opening day game against the Winnipeg Jets on October 13, but was added to the lineup just hours before the contest. In his NHL debut, McTavish scored his first career goal and recorded an assist in a 4–1 win. At 18 years, 256 days old, he surpassed Oleg Tverdovsky as the youngest Ducks player to score a goal. McTavish skated in three games before a lower-body injury forced him out of the lineup. He was assigned to the Ducks' American Hockey League (AHL) affiliate, the San Diego Gulls, on a conditioning loan on October 28. He recorded two points in three games for the Gulls while with the club. McTavish finished with two goals and one assist in nine games overall for the Ducks before being reassigned to the Petes on November 20. With not having exceeded the nine-game mark, the Ducks did not burn a year off of McTavish's entry-level contract. McTavish appeared in five games with the Petes, posting six goals and seven points before he was traded to contending club, the Hamilton Bulldogs, in exchange for two prospects and six draft selections on January 9, 2022.

On September 27, 2025, McTavish, a restricted free agent, signed a six-year contract with the Ducks.

=== St. Louis Blues ===
On June 26, 2026, the first night of the 2026 NHL draft, McTavish was traded by the Ducks to the St. Louis Blues in exchange for the 15th and 29th overall picks in that draft.

== International play ==
Medal record

Men's ice hockey

Representing Canada

World Junior Championships
Gold medal – first place	2022 Canada	

World U18 Championships
Gold medal – first place	2021 United States	

McTavish made his international debut with Canada under-18 team at the 2021 World U18 Championships. He tallied five goals and six assists in seven games, while Canada won the gold medal. Later in the year he was invited to join the roster for the Canada junior team in advance of the 2022 World Junior Championships. However, the tournament was cancelled after Canada had played two games, as a result of the spread of the Omicron variant. Shortly afterward, McTavish was selected to play for Canada senior team at the 2022 Winter Olympics, but the NHL have declined to allow its players to take part. He was part of the team's first line alongside veteran Eric Staal and Josh Ho-Sang, but the Canadian team struggled in the tournament and was eliminated in quarterfinals. When the International Ice Hockey Federation (IIHF) revived the cancelled 2022 World Junior Championships in August 2022, McTavish was again on the roster, and this time was named captain of the team in the absence of Kaiden Guhle. In an August 11 group stage game against Slovakia junior team, McTavish scored four goals as part of an 11–1 victory, tying a record for most goals scored by a Canadian player in a single World Junior Championships game. Canada advanced to the gold medal game against Finland junior team, where McTavish had his most significant moment of the tournament in overtime, using his stick to knock Finnish defenceman Topi Niemelä's potential game-winning shot out of midair onto the goal line, preventing a loss. Dubbed "the McTavish Miracle," it was considered an exceptionally skilled defensive play, and facilitated Canada's victory minutes later. McTavish was named the tournament MVP and one of Canada's three best players.

== Personal life ==
McTavish was born in Switzerland while his father, Dale, was playing for SC Rapperswil-Jona. He first began playing ice hockey in Zug before the family returned to Canada when Mason was eight years old following Dale's retirement. The family settled in Carp, Ontario. He has one older brother, Darian. His father is currently a scout in the Ottawa Senators organization.

== Career statistics ==
=== Regular season and playoffs ===
			Regular season					Playoffs
Season	Team	League	GP	G	A	Pts	PIM	GP	G	A	Pts	PIM
2018–19	Pembroke Lumber Kings	CCHL	5	3	4	7	6	—	—	—	—	—
2019–20	Peterborough Petes	OHL	57	29	13	42	31	—	—	—	—	—
2020–21	EHC Olten	SL	13	9	2	11	6	—	—	—	—	—
2021–22	Anaheim Ducks	NHL	9	2	1	3	2	—	—	—	—	—
2021–22	San Diego Gulls	AHL	3	1	1	2	4	—	—	—	—	—
2021–22	Peterborough Petes	OHL	5	6	1	7	11	—	—	—	—	—
2021–22	Hamilton Bulldogs	OHL	24	14	26	40	20	19	16	13	29	26
2022–23	Anaheim Ducks	NHL	80	17	26	43	44	—	—	—	—	—
2023–24	Anaheim Ducks	NHL	64	19	23	42	86	—	—	—	—	—
2024–25	Anaheim Ducks	NHL	76	22	30	52	38	—	—	—	—	—
2025–26	Anaheim Ducks	NHL	75	17	24	41	42	10	1	5	6	2
NHL totals			304	77	104	181	212	10	1	5	6	2

=== International ===
Year	Team	Event	Result	GP	G	A	Pts	PIM
2020	Canada White	U17	N/A	6	2	1	3	8
2021	Canada	U18	1st place, gold medalist(s)	7	5	6	11	10
2022	Canada	OG	6th	5	0	1	1	2
2022	Canada	WJC	1st place, gold medalist(s)	7	8	9	17	2
Junior totals				20	15	16	31	20
Senior totals				5	0	1	1	2

== Awards and honours ==
Award	Year	Ref
OHL
OHL Second All-Rookie Team	2020	
International
World U18 Championship – top 3 player on team	2021	
World Junior Championships – tournament MVP	2022	

Awards and achievements
Preceded by Jacob Perreault	Anaheim Ducks first-round draft pick 2021	Succeeded by Pavel Mintyukov
