= Alec Regula =

American ice hockey player (born 2000)

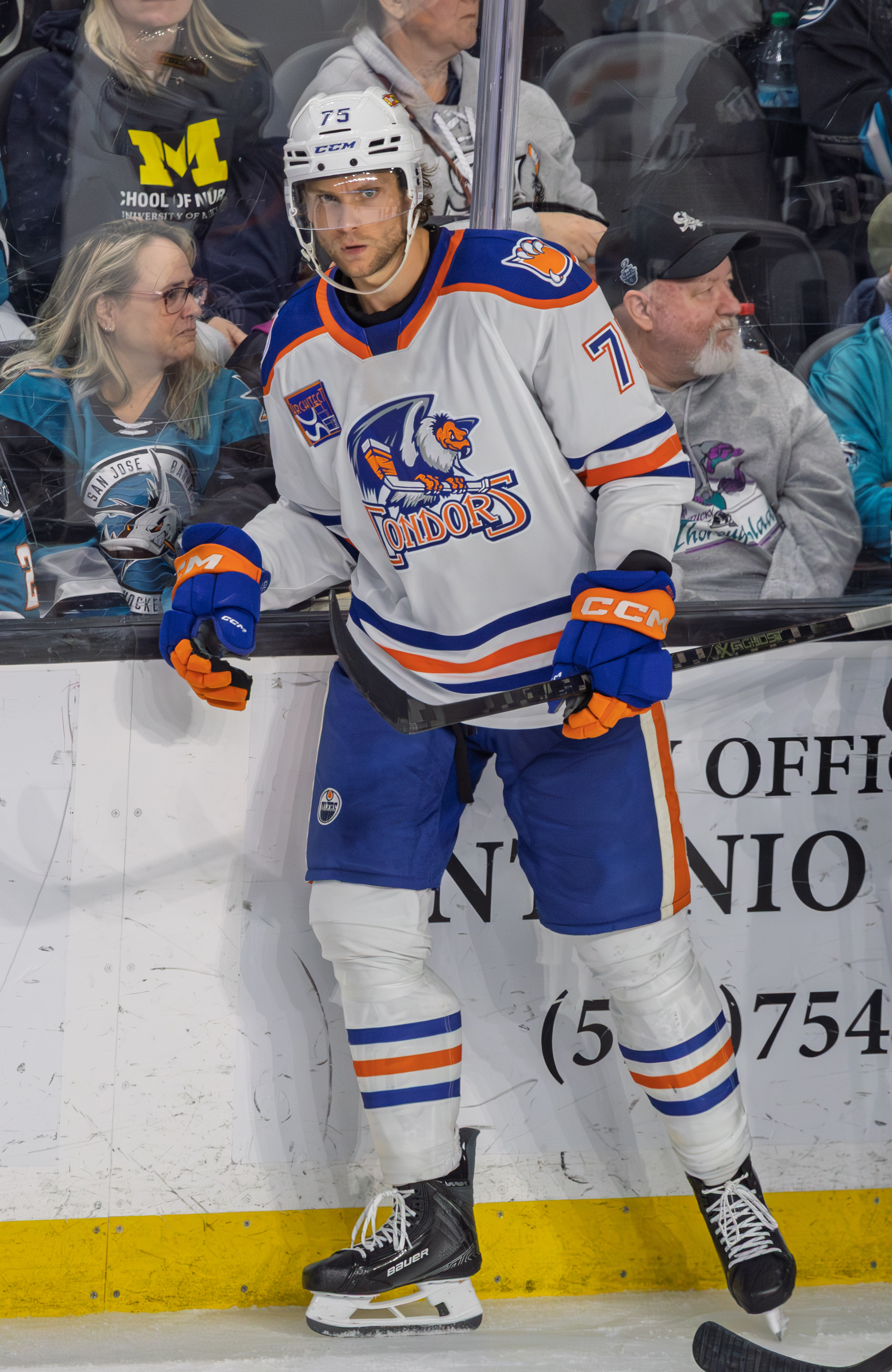
- Regula in 2026
- Born: August 6, 2000 (age 26) West Bloomfield, Michigan, U.S.
- Height: 6 ft 4 in (193 cm)
- Weight: 216 lb (98 kg; 15 st 6 lb)
- Position: Defense
- Shoots: Right
- NHL team (P) Cur. team Former teams: Edmonton Oilers; Bakersfield Condors (AHL); Chicago Blackhawks
- NHL draft: 67th overall, 2018; Detroit Red Wings
- Playing career: 2021–present

Alec Regula (born August 6, 2000) is an American professional ice hockey player who is a defenseman for the Bakersfield Condors of the American Hockey League (AHL) as a prospect to the Edmonton Oilers of the National Hockey League (NHL).

Growing up in Michigan, Regula began playing organized youth hockey with the Plymouth Stingrays of the Little Caesars Amateur Hockey League before being promoted to the Compuware program and Detroit Honeybaked U-13 team. He then chose to play two years with the Cranbrook Schools before joining the Chicago Steel of the United States Hockey League and London Knights of the Ontario Hockey League. Regula was drafted 67th overall by the Detroit Red Wings in the 2018 NHL entry draft but was traded to the Chicago Blackhawks in exchange for Brendan Perlini on October 28, 2019.

== Early life ==
Regula was born on August 6, 2000, in West Bloomfield Township, Michigan to parents C.J. and Nicole. Growing up, his father was the team dentist for the Detroit Red Wings of the National Hockey League so Regula spent time in the team dressing room at Joe Louis Arena.

== Playing career ==
=== Amateur ===
Growing up in Michigan, Regula began playing organized youth hockey with the Plymouth Stingrays of the Little Caesars Amateur Hockey League before being promoted to the Compuware program and Detroit Honeybaked U-13 team. Following this, Regula chose to play two years with the Cranbrook Schools alongside his brother C.J. under head coach Andy Weidenbach. As a freshman, he tallied three goals and nine assists to help lead the Cranbrook Cranes to the 2015 Division 3 state championship. Regula improved offensively the following season and accumulate four goals with 17 assists to be honored with second-team Division 3 all-state accolades.

Following his sophomore season, Regula was drafted in the fourth round, 74th overall, by the London Knights of the Ontario Hockey League (OHL). Despite this, Regula played 53 games at right defense with the Chicago Steel of the United States Hockey League before joining the Knights. While with the Steel, Regula tallied five points in the regular season to help the Steel win the 2016 Clark Cup. He then participated in the 2017 CCM/USA Hockey All-American Prospects Game before joining the Knights for the 2017–18 season.

During his first season with the Knights, Regula recorded seven goals and 18 assists through 67 games to be selected for the OHL First Team All-Rookie. By January 2018, Regula has tallied five goals and seven points and was ranked 43rd overall amongst draft-eligible North American skaters. At the conclusion of the season, Regula was drafted by the Detroit Red Wings in the third-round, 67th overall, of the 2018 NHL entry draft. He was then invited to attend the Red Wings Development Camp before returning to the Knights as co-captain alongside Liam Foudy.

=== Professional ===
He was acquired by the Blackhawks from the Red Wings in a trade for Brendan Perlini on October 28, 2019. He was signed to a three-year, entry-level contract with the Blackhawks on November 11, 2019.

As an impending restricted free agent following the completion of his entry-level contract with the Blackhawks, Regula and Ian Mitchell were traded to the Boston Bruins, in exchange for Nick Foligno and Taylor Hall on June 26, 2023.

Beginning the 2024–25 season on the injured reserve for the Bruins, Regula missed the opening two months of the campaign before returning to health. On December 11, 2024, Regula was claimed off waivers by the Edmonton Oilers. He missed the remainder of the season with an injury but on May 2, 2025, he signed a two-year two-way extension with the Oilers.

== Career statistics ==
| | | | Regular season | | | | | Playoffs |
| Season | Team | League | GP | G | A | Pts | PIM | GP | G | A | Pts | PIM |
|---|---|---|---|---|---|---|---|---|---|---|---|---|
| 2014–15 | Cranbrook Kingswood | USHS | 30 | 3 | 9 | 12 | 8 | — | — | — | — | — |
| 2015–16 | Cranbrook Kingswood | USHS | 24 | 3 | 16 | 19 | 6 | 12 | 5 | 7 | 12 | 12 |
| 2016–17 | Chicago Steel | USHL | 53 | 1 | 4 | 5 | 8 | 5 | 0 | 1 | 1 | 0 |
| 2017–18 | London Knights | OHL | 67 | 7 | 18 | 25 | 22 | 4 | 0 | 0 | 0 | 2 |
| 2018–19 | London Knights | OHL | 66 | 11 | 28 | 39 | 41 | 11 | 2 | 4 | 6 | 2 |
| 2019–20 | London Knights | OHL | 56 | 27 | 33 | 60 | 55 | — | — | — | — | — |
| 2020–21 | Rockford IceHogs | AHL | 16 | 3 | 1 | 4 | 12 | — | — | — | — | — |
| 2020–21 | Chicago Blackhawks | NHL | 3 | 0 | 0 | 0 | 0 | — | — | — | — | — |
| 2021–22 | Rockford IceHogs | AHL | 41 | 4 | 22 | 26 | 37 | 5 | 1 | 0 | 1 | 6 |
| 2021–22 | Chicago Blackhawks | NHL | 15 | 1 | 0 | 1 | 12 | — | — | — | — | — |
| 2022–23 | Chicago Blackhawks | NHL | 4 | 0 | 0 | 0 | 4 | — | — | — | — | — |
| 2022–23 | Rockford IceHogs | AHL | 51 | 5 | 16 | 21 | 69 | 5 | 0 | 1 | 1 | 10 |
| 2023–24 | Providence Bruins | AHL | 55 | 4 | 22 | 26 | 41 | — | — | — | — | — |
| 2025–26 | Edmonton Oilers | NHL | 29 | 0 | 3 | 3 | 35 | — | — | — | — | — |
| 2025–26 | Bakersfield Condors | AHL | 20 | 4 | 7 | 11 | 25 | 3 | 1 | 1 | 2 | 16 |
| NHL totals | | | 51 | 1 | 3 | 4 | 51 | — | — | — | — | — |

== Awards and honors ==
| Award | Year |
USHL
| Clark Cup (Chicago Steel) | 2017 |
OHL
| First All-Rookie Team | 2018 |
| Third All-Star Team | 2020 |
