= Nico Daws =

German-Canadian ice hockey player

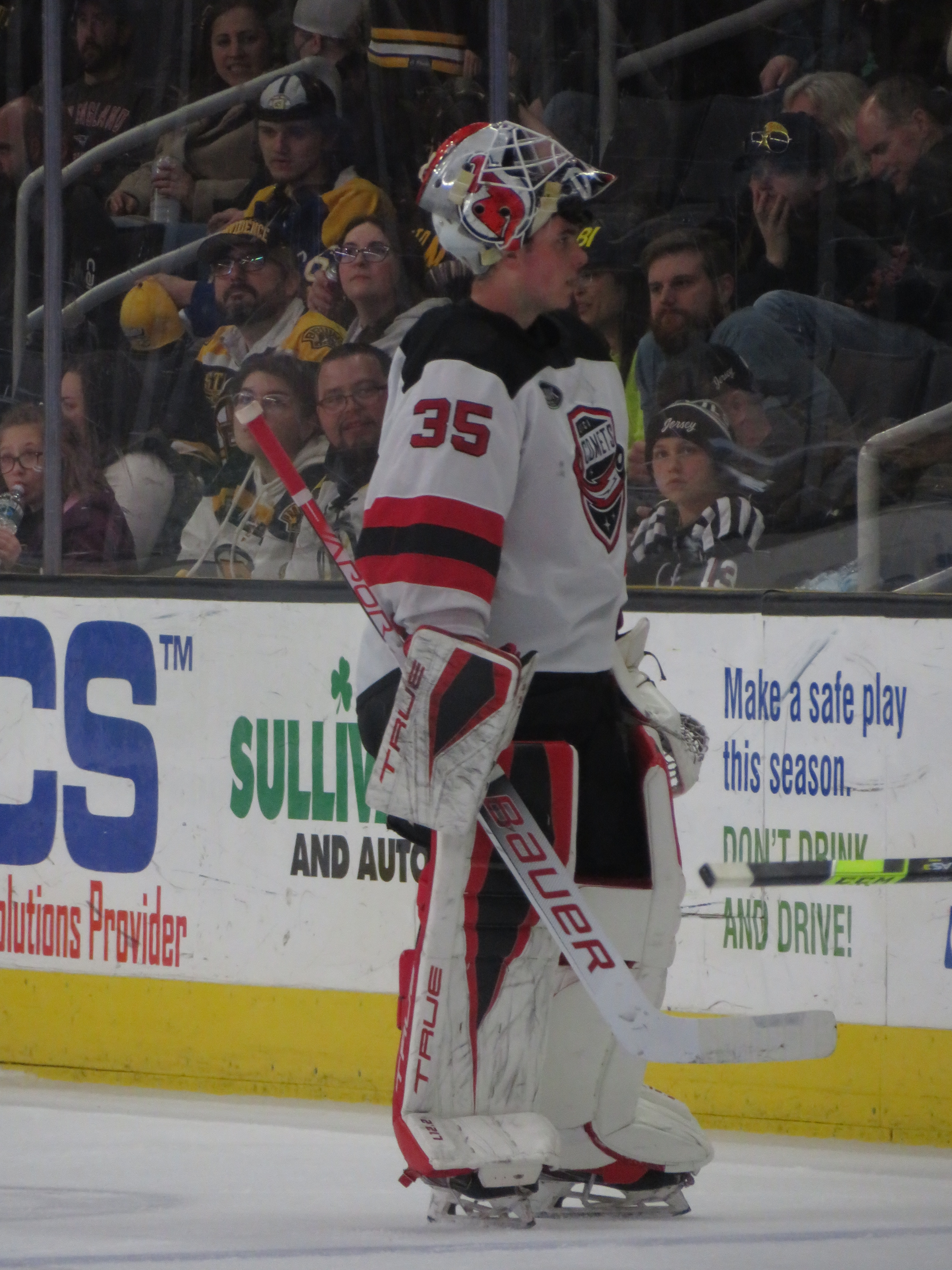
- Daws with the Utica Comets in 2022
- Born: December 22, 2000 (age 25) Munich, Germany
- Height: 6 ft 4 in (193 cm)
- Weight: 205 lb (93 kg; 14 st 9 lb)
- Position: Goaltender
- Catches: Left
- NHL team Former teams: Winnipeg Jets; ERC Ingolstadt; New Jersey Devils
- National team: Canada
- NHL draft: 84th overall, 2020; New Jersey Devils
- Playing career: 2020–present

Nicolas Daws (born December 22, 2000) is a German-Canadian professional ice hockey player who is a goaltender for the Winnipeg Jets of the National Hockey League (NHL). He was selected 84th overall by the New Jersey Devils in the 2020 NHL entry draft.

== Playing career ==
In the two seasons leading up to the 2019 NHL entry draft, Daws' first year of draft eligibility, he was the backup goaltender for the Guelph Storm of the Ontario Hockey League (OHL). Appearing in just 34 games over those two years, Daws led the OHL in goals against average and save percentage with a 2.06 and .939, respectively. Despite his impressive stat line and an OHL championship, he was not selected in the 2019 draft.

In the 2019–20 season, Daws appeared in 38 games, more than the previous two seasons combined despite the COVID-19 pandemic ending the season prematurely. Daws led the league in save percentage, and was named first team all-star and goaltender of the year. In October 2020, he was selected 84th overall in the third round of the 2020 NHL entry draft by the New Jersey Devils.

On November 13, 2020, Daws signed a one-year contract with ERC Ingolstadt of the Deutsche Eishockey Liga (DEL). In 10 games with Ingolstadt during the 2020–21 season, Daws posted four wins, one shutout, and a 2.90 goals against average.

On May 5, 2021, Daws signed a three-year, entry-level contract with the Devils. Daws started the 2021–22 season with the Utica Comets of American Hockey League (AHL), the AHL affiliate of the Devils. He was recalled by the Devils on October 21, and made his NHL debut on October 23, in a 2–1 overtime win against the Buffalo Sabres.

In the 2022–23 season, playing exclusively for Utica, Daws was named to the 2023 AHL All-Star Game.

In the off-season before the 2023–24 season, Daws underwent acetabular labrum surgery. After missing the beginning of the season, he was activated from non-roster injured reserve and assigned to Utica on December 8, 2023. In his season debut against the Bridgeport Islanders that night, Daws made 31 saves en route to a 4–1 victory. He made his NHL season debut on December 29, making 25 saves on 27 shots in a 6–2 win over the Ottawa Senators.

On July 30, 2024, the Devils re-signed Daws to a two-year, $1.625 million contract extension with an average annual value of $812,500. Over the course of the 2024–25 season, Daws made four NHL appearances, posting three wins and a .939 save percentage. With the Comets, he recorded 11 wins and a .893 save percentage in 34 games.

On October 5, 2025, Daws was placed on waivers for the first time in his career. The following day, upon clearing, he was assigned to Utica.

On October 23, 2026, Daws was traded to the Winnipeg Jets as part of a deal for Connor Hellebuyck.

== International play ==
Despite his German birth, Daws represents Canada internationally. His lone junior-level tournament appearance came at the 2020 World Junior Championships, where he played in parts of two games for the gold medal-winning Canadian team.

Following the 2023–24 NHL regular season and with the Devils failing to qualify for the 2024 Stanley Cup playoffs, Daws accepted an invitation to make his senior national team debut at the 2024 IIHF World Championship.

== Personal life ==
Born in Germany, Daws is also a citizen of Canada. His father is German and his mother is Canadian.

== Career statistics ==
=== Regular season and playoffs ===
| | | | Regular season | | | | | | | | | Playoffs |
| Season | Team | League | GP | W | L | OTL | MIN | GA | SO | GAA | SV% | GP | W | L | MIN | GA | SO | GAA | SV% |
|---|---|---|---|---|---|---|---|---|---|---|---|---|---|---|---|---|---|---|---|
| 2017–18 | Guelph Storm | OHL | 14 | 1 | 7 | 2 | 622 | 42 | 0 | 4.06 | .880 | 2 | 0 | 0 | 40 | 4 | 0 | 6.00 | .826 |
| 2018–19 | Guelph Storm | OHL | 20 | 10 | 5 | 3 | 1,126 | 61 | 1 | 3.25 | .893 | 2 | 0 | 0 | 38 | 3 | 0 | 4.81 | .800 |
| 2019–20 | Guelph Storm | OHL | 38 | 23 | 8 | 6 | 2,254 | 93 | 5 | 2.48 | .924 | — | — | — | — | — | — | — | — |
| 2020–21 | ERC Ingolstadt | DEL | 10 | 4 | 6 | 0 | 580 | 28 | 1 | 2.90 | .898 | — | — | — | — | — | — | — | — |
| 2021–22 | Utica Comets | AHL | 21 | 14 | 4 | 2 | 1,205 | 51 | 1 | 2.54 | .916 | 4 | 2 | 2 | 240 | 12 | 0 | 3.01 | .891 |
| 2021–22 | New Jersey Devils | NHL | 25 | 10 | 11 | 1 | 1,272 | 66 | 0 | 3.11 | .893 | — | — | — | — | — | — | — | — |
| 2022–23 | Utica Comets | AHL | 33 | 16 | 14 | 3 | 1,953 | 88 | 2 | 2.70 | .904 | 6 | 3 | 3 | 373 | 16 | 1 | 2.57 | .920 |
| 2023–24 | Utica Comets | AHL | 10 | 2 | 6 | 2 | 581 | 28 | 0 | 2.89 | .890 | — | — | — | — | — | — | — | — |
| 2023–24 | New Jersey Devils | NHL | 21 | 9 | 11 | 0 | 1,145 | 60 | 0 | 3.15 | .894 | — | — | — | — | — | — | — | — |
| 2024–25 | Utica Comets | AHL | 34 | 11 | 20 | 2 | 1,956 | 103 | 1 | 3.16 | .893 | — | — | — | — | — | — | — | — |
| 2024–25 | New Jersey Devils | NHL | 6 | 3 | 1 | 0 | 263 | 7 | 0 | 1.60 | .939 | — | — | — | — | — | — | — | — |
| 2025–26 | Utica Comets | AHL | 44 | 17 | 16 | 8 | 2,530 | 117 | 2 | 2.78 | .892 | — | — | — | — | — | — | — | — |
| 2025–26 | New Jersey Devils | NHL | 3 | 2 | 1 | 0 | 183 | 8 | 0 | 2.62 | .908 | — | — | — | — | — | — | — | — |
| 2026–27 | New Jersey Devils | NHL | 4 | 2 | 2 | 0 | 238 | 11 | 0 | 2.78 | .872 | — | — | — | — | — | — | — | — |
| DEL totals | | | 10 | 4 | 6 | 0 | 580 | 28 | 1 | 2.90 | .898 | — | — | — | — | — | — | — | — |
| NHL totals | | | 59 | 26 | 26 | 1 | 3,100 | 152 | 0 | 2.94 | .897 | — | — | — | — | — | — | — | — |

=== International ===
Medal record

Men's ice hockey

Representing Canada

World Junior Championships
| Gold medal – first place | 2020 Czech Republic | |

| Year | Team | Event | Result | GP | W | L | T | MIN | GA | SO | GAA | SV% |
|---|---|---|---|---|---|---|---|---|---|---|---|---|
| 2020 | Canada | WJC | 1st place, gold medalist(s) | 2 | 1 | 1 | 0 | 82 | 8 | 0 | 5.83 | .840 |
| 2024 | Canada | WC | 4th | 1 | 1 | 0 | 0 | 60 | 1 | 0 | 1.00 | .833 |
| Junior totals | | | | 2 | 1 | 1 | 0 | 82 | 8 | 0 | 5.83 | .840 |
| Senior totals | | | | 1 | 1 | 0 | 0 | 60 | 1 | 0 | 1.00 | .833 |

== Awards and honours ==
| Award | Year | Ref |
OHL
| First Team All-Star | 2020 | |
| Goaltender of the Year | 2020 | |
AHL
| AHL All-Star Game | 2023 | |
