= 2019–20 OHL season =

- League: Ontario Hockey League
- Sport: Hockey
- Duration: Preseason; August 2019 – September 2019; Regular season September 19, 2019 – March 18, 2020
- Teams: 20
- TV partner(s): Rogers TV, Shaw TV, YourTV, Sportsnet

Draft
- Top draft pick: Shane Wright
- Picked by: Kingston Frontenacs

Regular season
- Hamilton Spectator Trophy: Ottawa 67's (5)
- Season MVP: Marco Rossi (Ottawa 67's)
- Top scorer: Marco Rossi (Ottawa 67's)

Playoffs
- Finals champions: None

OHL seasons
- 2018–19 2020–21 (cancelled)

2019–20 CHL season
- League: Canadian Hockey League
- Sport: Hockey
- Duration: OHL; September 2019 – March 2020; QMJHL; September 2019 – March 2020; WHL; September 2019 – March 2020
- Teams: 60
- TV partner(s): RDS; Rogers Sportsnet; Rogers TV; Shaw TV
- Season MVP: Alexis Lafrenière (Rimouski Océanic) (QMJHL)
- Top scorer: Marco Rossi (Ottawa 67's) (OHL)

Memorial Cup
- Finals champions: None (cancelled)

The 2019–20 OHL season was the 40th season of the Ontario Hockey League, in which twenty teams were scheduled to playing 68 games each according to the regular season schedule, from September 19, 2019 to March 22, 2020. Due to the COVID-19 pandemic in North America, the regular season was suspended on March 12, 2020, and cancelled six days later.

The post-season was to commence following the regular season, in which sixteen teams would compete for the J. Ross Robertson Cup and be crowned champions of the OHL. Due to the COVID-19 pandemic in North America, the playoffs were cancelled.

== Postponed games ==
On December 12, 2019, Niagara IceDogs goaltender Tucker Tynan suffered a severe injury after being cut by a skate blade in his right thigh as he was involved in a collision with an opposing player during the first minute of play in the second period. The IceDogs game against the London Knights was postponed following the incident. The league then postponed the IceDogs next two games, against the Peterborough Petes on December 15 and the Ottawa 67's on December 16 to allow IceDogs players time to cope and access resources for support. The IceDogs home game against the London Knights was rescheduled and played on February 4, 2020. The IceDogs rescheduled game in Peterborough against the Peterborough Petes was rescheduled on played on January 19, 2020; and their road game in Ottawa against the Ottawa 67's was rescheduled and played on March 10, 2020.

== Suspension and cancellation of regular season ==
On March 12, 2020, the Ontario Hockey League announced that the season would be paused due to the COVID-19 pandemic in North America. Six days later, on March 18, the league announced that the remainder of the regular season was cancelled. The final OHL standings are based on each OHL team having played an equal number of 61 regular season games.

== Cancellation of playoffs and Memorial Cup ==
On March 23, 2020, the Ontario Hockey League announced the cancellation of the playoffs due to the COVID-19 pandemic in North America. The Canadian Hockey League announced that the 2020 Memorial Cup held in Kelowna, British Columbia was cancelled.

== Regular season ==
Final standings
Note: DIV = Division; GP = Games played; W = Wins; L = Losses; OTL = Overtime losses; SL = Shootout losses; GF = Goals for; GA = Goals against;
PTS = Points; x = clinched playoff berth; y = clinched division title; z = clinched conference title

=== Eastern conference ===
| Rank | Team | DIV | GP | W | L | OTL | SL | PTS | GF | GA |
|---|---|---|---|---|---|---|---|---|---|---|
| 1 | z-Ottawa 67's | East | 62 | 50 | 11 | 0 | 1 | 101 | 296 | 165 |
| 2 | y-Sudbury Wolves | Central | 63 | 34 | 27 | 1 | 1 | 70 | 259 | 240 |
| 3 | x-Peterborough Petes | East | 62 | 37 | 21 | 2 | 2 | 78 | 250 | 198 |
| 4 | x-Oshawa Generals | East | 62 | 31 | 20 | 6 | 5 | 73 | 229 | 227 |
| 5 | x-Barrie Colts | Central | 63 | 29 | 28 | 4 | 2 | 64 | 220 | 261 |
| 6 | x-Mississauga Steelheads | Central | 61 | 27 | 29 | 4 | 1 | 59 | 223 | 227 |
| 7 | x-Hamilton Bulldogs | East | 62 | 24 | 30 | 7 | 1 | 56 | 235 | 267 |
| 8 | x-Kingston Frontenacs | East | 62 | 19 | 39 | 2 | 2 | 42 | 198 | 285 |
| 9 | Niagara IceDogs | Central | 63 | 18 | 39 | 5 | 1 | 42 | 194 | 320 |
| 10 | North Bay Battalion | Central | 62 | 17 | 41 | 4 | 0 | 38 | 189 | 314 |

=== Western conference ===
| Rank | Team | DIV | GP | W | L | OTL | SL | PTS | GF | GA |
|---|---|---|---|---|---|---|---|---|---|---|
| 1 | z-London Knights | Midwest | 62 | 45 | 15 | 1 | 1 | 92 | 265 | 187 |
| 2 | y-Saginaw Spirit | West | 62 | 41 | 16 | 3 | 2 | 87 | 289 | 225 |
| 3 | x-Kitchener Rangers | Midwest | 63 | 40 | 16 | 5 | 2 | 87 | 264 | 213 |
| 4 | x-Flint Firebirds | West | 63 | 40 | 21 | 1 | 1 | 82 | 274 | 243 |
| 5 | x-Windsor Spitfires | West | 62 | 34 | 20 | 8 | 0 | 76 | 256 | 233 |
| 6 | x-Guelph Storm | Midwest | 63 | 32 | 23 | 3 | 5 | 72 | 218 | 209 |
| 7 | x-Owen Sound Attack | Midwest | 62 | 30 | 24 | 4 | 4 | 68 | 235 | 207 |
| 8 | x-Erie Otters | Midwest | 63 | 26 | 26 | 4 | 7 | 63 | 229 | 236 |
| 9 | Sault Ste. Marie Greyhounds | West | 64 | 29 | 31 | 3 | 1 | 62 | 253 | 257 |
| 10 | Sarnia Sting | West | 62 | 22 | 34 | 5 | 1 | 50 | 244 | 299 |

=== Scoring leaders ===
Note: GP = Games played; G = Goals; A = Assists; Pts = Points; PIM = Penalty minutes

| Player | Team | GP | G | A | Pts | PIM |
|---|---|---|---|---|---|---|
| Marco Rossi | Ottawa 67's | 56 | 39 | 81 | 120 | 40 |
| Cole Perfetti | Saginaw Spirit | 61 | 37 | 74 | 111 | 16 |
| Connor McMichael | London Knights | 52 | 47 | 55 | 102 | 26 |
| Philip Tomasino | Niagara/Oshawa | 62 | 40 | 60 | 100 | 32 |
| Arthur Kaliyev | Hamilton Bulldogs | 57 | 44 | 54 | 98 | 28 |
| Pavel Gogolev | Guelph Storm | 63 | 45 | 51 | 96 | 66 |
| Joseph Garreffa | Ottawa 67's | 52 | 36 | 54 | 90 | 2 |
| Jack Quinn | Ottawa 67's | 62 | 52 | 37 | 89 | 32 |
| Austen Keating | Ottawa 67's | 58 | 32 | 57 | 89 | 10 |
| Nick Robertson | Peterborough Petes | 46 | 55 | 31 | 86 | 40 |

=== Leading goaltenders ===
Note: GP = Games played; Mins = Minutes played; W = Wins; L = Losses: OTL = Overtime losses;
SL = Shootout losses; GA = Goals Allowed; SO = Shutouts; GAA = Goals against average

| Player | Team | GP | Mins | W | L | OTL | SL | GA | SO | Sv% | GAA |
|---|---|---|---|---|---|---|---|---|---|---|---|
| Brett Brochu | London Knights | 42 | 2271 | 32 | 6 | 0 | 0 | 91 | 2 | 0.919 | 2.40 |
| Cedrick Andree | Ottawa 67's | 43 | 2529 | 32 | 9 | 0 | 1 | 102 | 4 | 0.916 | 2.42 |
| Nico Daws | Guelph Storm | 38 | 2254 | 22 | 8 | 3 | 3 | 93 | 5 | 0.924 | 2.48 |
| Hunter Jones | Peterborough Petes | 49 | 2833 | 31 | 14 | 2 | 1 | 130 | 4 | 0.913 | 2.75 |
| Jacob Ingham | Kitchener Rangers | 46 | 2739 | 33 | 8 | 4 | 1 | 135 | 2 | 0.917 | 2.96 |

== Awards ==
Playoffs trophies
| Trophy name | Recognition | Recipient |
|---|---|---|
| J. Ross Robertson Cup | OHL Finals champion | Not Awarded |
| Bobby Orr Trophy | Eastern Conference playoff champion | Not Awarded |
| Wayne Gretzky Trophy | Western Conference playoff champion | Not Awarded |
| Wayne Gretzky 99 Award | Playoffs MVP | Not Awarded |
Regular season — Team trophies
| Trophy name | Recognition | Recipient |
| Hamilton Spectator Trophy | Team with best record | Ottawa 67's |
| Leyden Trophy | East division champion | Ottawa 67's |
| Emms Trophy | Central division champion | Sudbury Wolves |
| Bumbacco Trophy | West division champion | Saginaw Spirit |
| Holody Trophy | Midwest division champion | London Knights |
Regular season — Executive awards
| Trophy name | Recognition | Recipient |
| Matt Leyden Trophy | Coach of the year | Andre Tourigny, Ottawa 67's |
| Jim Gregory Award | General manager of the year | Jim Boyd, Ottawa 67's |
| Bill Long Award | Lifetime achievement | - |
| OHL Executive of the Year | Executive of the Year | – |
Regular season — Player awards
| Trophy name | Recognition | Recipient |
| Red Tilson Trophy | Most outstanding player | Marco Rossi, Ottawa 67's |
| Eddie Powers Memorial Trophy | Top scorer | Marco Rossi, Ottawa 67's |
| Dave Pinkney Trophy | Lowest team goals against | Cedrick Andree & Will Cranley, Ottawa 67's |
| Max Kaminsky Trophy | Most outstanding defenceman | Noel Hoefenmayer, Ottawa 67's |
| Jim Mahon Memorial Trophy | Top scoring right winger | Arthur Kaliyev, Hamilton Bulldogs |
| Emms Family Award | Rookie of the year | Shane Wright, Kingston Frontenacs |
| William Hanley Trophy | Most sportsmanlike player | Nick Robertson, Peterborough Petes |
| F. W. "Dinty" Moore Trophy | Best rookie GAA | Brett Brochu, London Knights |
| Bobby Smith Trophy | Scholastic player of the year | Cole Perfetti, Saginaw Spirit |
| Leo Lalonde Memorial Trophy | Overage player of the year | Austen Keating, Ottawa 67's |
| Jim Rutherford Trophy | Goaltender of the year | Nico Daws, Guelph Storm |
| Dan Snyder Memorial Trophy | Humanitarian of the year | Jacob Ingham, Kitchener Rangers |
| Roger Neilson Memorial Award | Top academic college/university player | Jacob Golden, Erie Otters |
| Ivan Tennant Memorial Award | Top academic high school player | Logan LeSage, Owen Sound Attack |
| Mickey Renaud Captain's Trophy | Team captain that best exemplifies character and commitment | Ty Dellandrea, Flint Firebirds |
Prospect player awards
| Trophy name | Recognition | Recipient |
| Jack Ferguson Award | First overall pick in priority selection | Ty Nelson, North Bay Battalion |
| Tim Adams Memorial Trophy | OHL Cup MVP | Not Awarded |

== All-Star teams ==
The OHL All-Star Teams were selected by the OHL's General Managers.

=== First team ===
- Marco Rossi, Centre, Ottawa 67's
- Nick Robertson, Left Wing, Peterborough Petes
- Arthur Kaliyev, Right Wing, Hamilton Bulldogs
- Noel Hoefenmayer, Defence, Ottawa 67's
- Jamie Drysdale, Defence, Erie Otters
- Nico Daws, Goaltender, Guelph Storm
- Andre Tourigny, Coach, Ottawa 67's

=== Second team ===
- Connor McMichael, Centre, London Knights
- Cole Perfetti, Left Wing, Saginaw Spirit
- Joseph Garreffa, Right Wing, Ottawa 67's
- Thomas Harley, Defence, Mississauga Steelheads
- Kevin Bahl, Defence, Ottawa 67's
- Jacob Ingham, Goaltender, Kitchener Rangers
- Dale Hunter, Coach, London Knights

=== Third team ===
- Quinton Byfield, Centre, Sudbury Wolves
- Pavel Gogolev, Left Wing, Guelph Storm
- Sean Josling, Right Wing, Sarnia Sting
- Alec Regula, Defence, London Knights
- Ryan Merkley, Defence, London Knights
- Cedrick Andree, Goaltender, Ottawa 67's
- George Burnett, Coach, Guelph Storm

== All-Rookie teams ==
The OHL All-Rookie Teams were selected by the OHL's General Managers.

=== First team ===
- Shane Wright, Centre, Kingston Frontenacs
- Brennan Othmann, Left Wing, Flint Firebirds
- Chase Stillman, Right Wing, Sudbury Wolves
- Brandt Clarke, Defence, Barrie Colts
- Ruben Rafkin, Defence, Windsor Spitfires
- Brett Brochu, Goaltender, London Knights

=== Second team ===
- Mason McTavish, Centre, Peterborough Petes
- Martin Chromiak, Left Wing, Kingston Frontenacs
- Oliver Suni, Right Wing, Oshawa Generals
- Paul Christopoulos, Defence, North Bay Battalion
- Mitchell Smith, Defence, Saginaw Spirit
- Joe Vrbetic, Goaltender, North Bay Battalion

== 2020 OHL Priority Selection ==
On April 4, 2020, the OHL conducted the 2020 Ontario Hockey League Priority Selection. The North Bay Battalion held the first overall pick in the draft, and selected Ty Nelson from the Toronto Jr. Canadiens of the GTHL. Nelson was awarded the Jack Ferguson Award, awarded to the top pick in the draft.

Below are the players who were selected in the first round of the 2020 Ontario Hockey League Priority Selection.

| # | Player | Nationality | OHL team | Hometown | Minor team |
|---|---|---|---|---|---|
| 1 | Ty Nelson (D) | Canada | North Bay Battalion | Toronto, Ontario | Toronto Jr. Canadiens (GTHL) |
| 2 | Pano Fimis (C) | Canada | Niagara IceDogs | Richmond Hill, Ontario | Toronto Jr. Canadiens (GTHL) |
| 3 | Max Namestnikov (C) | United States | Sarnia Sting | Wolverine Lake, Michigan | Detroit Honeybaked U15 (HPHL) |
| 4 | Bryce McConnell-Barker (C) | Canada | Sault Ste. Marie Greyhounds | London, Ontario | London Jr. Knights (MHAO) |
| 5 | Paul Ludwinski (C) | Canada | Kingston Frontenacs | Pickering, Ontario | Toronto Marlboros (GTHL) |
| 6 | Jorian Donovan (D) | Canada | Hamilton Bulldogs | Richmond, Ontario | Kanata Lasers (HEO Midget) |
| 7 | Zakary Lavoie (RW) | Canada | Mississauga Steelheads | Orleans, Ontario | Toronto Nationals (GTHL) |
| 8 | Spencer Sova (D) | / (United States) Canada/USA | Erie Otters | Windsor, Ontario | Detroit Honeybaked U15 (HPHL) |
| 9 | Hunter Haight (C) | Canada | Barrie Colts | Strathroy, Ontario | Elgin-Middlesex Chiefs (MHAO) |
| 10 | Cedrick Guindon (C) | Canada | Owen Sound Attack | Rockland, Ontario | Rockland Nationals (HEO Midget) |
| 11 | David Goyette (C) | Canada | Sudbury Wolves | Hawkesbury, Ontario | South Kent Selects U15 (NPHL15) |
| 12 | Matt Poitras (C) | Canada | Guelph Storm | Brooklin, Ontario | Whitby Wildcats (OMHA-EHL) |
| 13 | Aidan Castle (LW) | Canada | Oshawa Generals | Mississauga, Ontario | Toronto Jr. Canadiens (GTHL) |
| 14 | Ryan Abraham (C) | United States | Windsor Spitfires | Livonia, Michigan | Detroit Compuware U15 (HPHL) |
| 15 | Donovan McCoy (D) | Canada | Peterborough Petes | Belleville, Ontario | Quinte Red Devils (OMHA-EHL) |
| 16 | Gavin Hayes (RW) | United States | Flint Firebirds | Westland, Michigan | Detroit Compuware U15 (HPHL) |
| 17 | Andrew Leblanc (C) | Canada | Kitchener Rangers | Port Colborne, Ontario | Southern Tier Admirals (OMHA-SCTA) |
| 18 | Adam Fantilli (C) | Canada | Saginaw Spirit | Nobleton, Ontario | Kimball Union Academy Wildcats (NEPS) |
| 19 | Ben Bujold (C) | Canada | London Knights | Richmond, Ontario | Kanata Lasers (HEO Midget) |
| 20 | Nicholas Moldenhauer (RW) | Canada | Ottawa 67's | Mississauga, Ontario | Toronto Titans (GTHL) |

== 2020 CHL Import Draft ==
On June 30, 2020, the Canadian Hockey League conducted the 2020 CHL Import Draft, in which teams in all three CHL leagues participate in. The North Bay Battalion held the first pick in the draft by a team in the OHL, and selected Matvei Petrov from Russia with their selection.

Below are the players who were selected in the first round by Ontario Hockey League teams in the 2020 CHL Import Draft.

| # | Player | Nationality | OHL team | Hometown | Last team |
|---|---|---|---|---|---|
| 1 | Matvei Petrov (RW) | Russia | North Bay Battalion | Moscow, Russia | MHK Krylia Sovetov Moscow |
| 4 | Danil Gushchin (LW) | Russia | Niagara IceDogs | Yekaterinburg, Russia | Muskegon Lumberjacks |
| 7 | Alex Geci (C) | Slovakia | Sarnia Sting | Topolcany, Slovakia | Slovan Bratislava Jr. |
| 10 | No selection made | | Sault Ste. Marie Greyhounds | | |
| 13 | No selection made | | Kingston Frontenacs | | |
| 16 | Artyom Grushnikov (D) | Russia | Hamilton Bulldogs | Moscow, Russia | Moscow CSKA Krasnaya Armiya |
| 19 | Kasper Larsen (D) | Denmark | Mississauga Steelheads | Rodovre, Denmark | Rodovre Mighty Bulls |
| 22 | Alexei Kolosov (G) | Belarus | Erie Otters | Minsk, Belarus | Belarus U20 |
| 25 | Stanislav Vrhel (C) | Czech Republic | Barrie Colts | Chomutov, Czech Republic | Peliitat |
| 28 | Noah Delemont (D) | Switzerland | Owen Sound Attack | Biel, Switzerland | Acadie-Bathurst Titan |
| 31 | Samu Tuomaala (RW) | Finland | Sudbury Wolves | Oulu, Finland | Karpat Oulu Jr. |
| 34 | No selection made | | Guelph Storm | | |
| 37 | David Mudrak (D) | Slovakia | Oshawa Generals | Zvolen, Slovakia | TPS Turku Jr. |
| 40 | Daniil Sobolev (D) | Russia | Windsor Spitfires | St. Petersburg, Russia | Moscow Spartak Jr. |
| 43 | Brian Zanetti (D) | Switzerland | Peterborough Petes | Lugano, Switzerland | Lugano HC Jr. |
| 46 | Dmitry Kuzmin (D) | Belarus | Flint Firebirds | Kholstovo, Belarus | Belarus U20 |
| 49 | Pavel Cajan (G) | Czech Republic | Kitchener Rangers | Liberec, Czech Republic | Liberec Bili Tygri Jr. |
| 52 | Pavel Mintyukov (D) | Russia | Saginaw Spirit | Moscow, Russia | MHC Dynamo Moscow Jr. |
| 55 | John Jason Peterka (LW) | Germany | London Knights | Munich, Germany | Munchen Red Bull EHC |
| 57 | Vsevolod Gaidamak (C) | Russia | Ottawa 67's | Khabarovsk, Russia | Moscow Spartak U17 |

== 2020 NHL entry draft ==
On October 6–7, 2020, the National Hockey League conducted the 2020 NHL entry draft held via video conference call. In total, 31 players from the Ontario Hockey League were selected in the draft. Quinton Byfield of the Sudbury Wolves was the highest player from the OHL to be selected, as he was taken with the second overall pick by the Los Angeles Kings.

Below are the players selected from OHL teams at the NHL Entry Draft.

| Round | # | Player | Nationality | NHL team | Hometown | OHL team |
|---|---|---|---|---|---|---|
| 1 | 2 | Quinton Byfield (C) | Canada | Los Angeles Kings | Newmarket, Ontario | Sudbury Wolves |
| 1 | 6 | Jamie Drysdale (D) | Canada | Anaheim Ducks | Toronto, Ontario | Erie Otters |
| 1 | 8 | Jack Quinn (RW) | Canada | Buffalo Sabres | Cobden, Ontario | Ottawa 67's |
| 1 | 9 | Marco Rossi (C) | Austria | Minnesota Wild | Feldkirch, Austria | Ottawa 67's |
| 1 | 10 | Cole Perfetti (C) | Canada | Winnipeg Jets | Whitby, Ontario | Saginaw Spirit |
| 1 | 23 | Tyson Foerster (RW) | Canada | Philadelphia Flyers | Alliston, Ontario | Barrie Colts |
| 1 | 27 | Jacob Perreault (RW) | Canada | Anaheim Ducks | Montreal, Quebec | Sarnia Sting |
| 2 | 39 | Ryan O'Rourke (D) | Canada | Minnesota Wild | Pickering, Ontario | Sault Ste. Marie Greyhounds |
| 2 | 42 | Luke Evangelista (RW) | Canada | Nashville Predators | Oakville, Ontario | London Knights |
| 2 | 48 | Jan Mysak (C) | Czech Republic | Montreal Canadiens | Litvínov, Czech Republic | Hamilton Bulldogs |
| 2 | 60 | Will Cuylle (LW) | Canada | New York Rangers | Toronto, Ontario | Windsor Spitfires |
| 3 | 63 | Donovan Sebrango (D) | Canada | Detroit Red Wings | Kingston, Ontario | Kitchener Rangers |
| 3 | 75 | Jean-Luc Foudy (C) | Canada | Colorado Avalanche | Scarborough, Ontario | Windsor Spitfires |
| 3 | 84 | Nico Daws (G) | Canada | New Jersey Devils | Burlington, Ontario | Guelph Storm |
| 3 | 93 | Jack Thompson (D) | Canada | Tampa Bay Lightning | Courtice, Ontario | Sudbury Wolves |
| 4 | 94 | Zayde Wisdom (RW) | Canada | Philadelphia Flyers | Toronto, Ontario | Kingston Frontenacs |
| 4 | 98 | Brandon Coe (RW) | Canada | San Jose Sharks | Toronto, Ontario | North Bay Battalion |
| 4 | 99 | Jaromir Pytlik (C) | Czech Republic | New Jersey Devils | Dačice, Czech Republic | Sault Ste. Marie Greyhounds |
| 4 | 119 | Tanner Dickinson (C) | United States | St. Louis Blues | Perrysburg, Ohio | Sault Ste. Marie Greyhounds |
| 4 | 123 | Antonio Stranges (LW) | United States | Dallas Stars | Plymouth, Michigan | London Knights |
| 5 | 126 | Tyler Tullio (RW) | Canada | Edmonton Oilers | Lakeshore, Ontario | Oshawa Generals |
| 5 | 127 | Evan Vierling (C) | Canada | New York Rangers | Aurora, Ontario | Barrie Colts |
| 5 | 128 | Martin Chromiak (RW) | Slovakia | Los Angeles Kings | Ilava, Slovakia | Kingston Frontenacs |
| 5 | 141 | Isaak Phillips (D) | Canada | Chicago Blackhawks | Barrie, Ontario | Sudbury Wolves |
| 5 | 145 | Ole Julian Bjorgvik Holm (D) | Norway | Columbus Blue Jackets | Oslo, Norway | Mississauga Steelheads |
| 6 | 162 | Yevgeni Oksentyuk (LW) | Belarus | Dallas Stars | Brest, Belarus | Flint Firebirds |
| 6 | 163 | Will Cranley (G) | Canada | St. Louis Blues | Peterborough, Ontario | Ottawa 67's |
| 6 | 172 | Chad Yetman (C) | Canada | Chicago Blackhawks | Whitby, Ontario | Erie Otters |
| 6 | 174 | Rory Kerins (C) | Canada | Calgary Flames | Caledon, Ontario | Sault Ste. Marie Greyhounds |
| 7 | 205 | Ilya Solovyov (D) | Belarus | Calgary Flames | Mogilev, Belarus | Saginaw Spirit |
| 7 | 217 | Declan McDonell (RW) | United States | Tampa Bay Lightning | Lake View, New York | Kitchener Rangers |

== World U-17 Hockey Challenge ==
The World U-17 Hockey Challenge was held in Medicine Hat, Alberta and Moose Jaw, Saskatchewan from November 2–9, 2019. Russia won the tournament, defeating the United States 6–2 in the gold medal game. The Czech Republic won the bronze medal, as they defeated Canada White 3–2 in overtime to claim the medal.

Canada sent three teams to the tournament: Canada Black, Canada Red, and Canada White. Other countries participating in the tournament were Czech Republic, Finland, Russia, Sweden, and the United States. Only the three clubs representing Canada had players from the OHL on their teams.

=== Canada Black ===
The Canada Black team had ten players from the OHL on their team. They included: Brandt Clarke, (Barrie Colts); Ethan Del Mastro, (Mississauga Steelheads); Benjamin Gaudreau, (Sarnia Sting); Kaleb Lawrence, (Owen Sound Attack); Landon McCallum, (Sudbury Wolves); Max McCue, (London Knights); Brennan Othmann, (Flint Firebirds); Shane Wright, (Kingston Frontenacs); Ryan Winterton, (Hamilton Bulldogs); and Danny Zhilkin (Guelph Storm). The head coach of the team was Niagara IceDogs associate coach Jody Hull. London Knights assistant coach Drew Hunter worked as an assistant coach.

Shane Wright was named captain of the team. He tied for the team lead in points with seven, as he scored four goals and three assists in five games. Goaltender Benjamin Gaudreau earned a 1–1 record with a 5.95 GAA and a .787 save percentage in four games.

=== Canada Red ===
The Canada Red team had seven players from the OHL on their team. They included: Josh Bloom, (Saginaw Spirit); Jacob Holmes, (Sault Ste. Marie Greyhounds); Wyatt Johnston, (Windsor Spitfires); Braeden Kressler, (Flint Firebirds); Connor Lockhart, (Erie Otters); Francesco Pinelli, (Kitchener Rangers); and Connor Punnett, (Saginaw Spirit). Kingston Frontenacs head coach Kurtis Foster worked as an assistant coach on the team.

Wyatt Johnston tied for the team lead in points, as he scored two goals and three assists to earn five points in five games.

=== Canada White ===
The Canada White team had seven players from the OHL on their team. They included: Liam Arnsby, (North Bay Battalion); Jon-Randall Avon, (Peterborough Petes); Jack Beck, (Ottawa 67's); Isaac Enright, (Niagara IceDogs); Brett Harrison, (Oshawa Generals); Mason McTavish, (Peterborough Petes); and Chase Stillman, (Sudbury Wolves).

Chase Stillman was the highest scoring OHL player on the team, as he scored one goal and added three assists in six games.

== CIBC Canada/Russia Series ==
The 2019 CHL Canada/Russia Series was held from November 4 until November 14, as an all-star team from each of the three leagues in the Canadian Hockey League faced off a select team of players from Russia. Each league hosts two games, and the two games hosted by the Ontario Hockey League in 2019 were held at the Kitchener Memorial Auditorium in Kitchener, Ontario on November 7, and Budweiser Gardens in London, Ontario. Previously, two games were hosted by the QMJHL, as TD Station in Saint John, New Brunswick hosted the first game of the series on November 4, followed by the second game of the series played at Avenir Centre in Moncton, New Brunswick. After the two games hosted by the OHL, the final two games of the series were hosted by the WHL, as the fifth game of the series was held at the SaskTel Centre in Saskatoon, Saskatchewan. The sixth and final game of the series was held at the Art Hauser Centre in Prince Albert, Saskatchewan.

=== QMJHL ===
The 2019 CIBC Canada/Russia Series began on November 4, as Russia defeated the QMJHL 5–4 at TD Station in Saint John, New Brunswick. The following evening, the QMJHL defeated Russia 4–3 in overtime at the Avenir Centre in Moncton, New Brunswick. Russia held a four-point to two lead over the CHL after two games.

=== Kitchener ===
The third game of the series was played at the Kitchener Memorial Auditorium in Kitchener, Ontario on November 7. London Knights head coach Dale Hunter was the head coach of Team OHL. The assistant coaches of the team included Jay McKee, who is the head coach of the Kitchener Rangers; Andre Tourigny, who is the head coach of the Ottawa 67's; and Dylan Hunter, who is an assistant coach with the London Knights.

The OHL got off to a solid start, as Ty Dellandrea of the Flint Firebirds scored the opening goal of the game 5:12 into the first period on the power play, giving the OHL a 1–0 lead. Just over three minutes later, Cole Perfetti of the Saginaw Spirit scored for the OHL, as they took a 2–0 lead after the first period. Nico Daws of the Guelph Storm was strong in goal, stopping all nine shots he faced.

The OHL extended their lead to 3–0 on a goal by Connor McMichael of the London Knights at the 6:40 mark of the second period. Midway through the period, the OHL made a goaltender change, as Nico Daws left the game stopping all 13 shots he faced. He was replaced by Cedrick Andree of the Ottawa 67's. Andree played solid for the remainder of the period, stopping the four shots that were fired at him, as the OHL took a 3–0 lead into the second intermission.

In the third period, the OHL's Akil Thomas of the Niagara IceDogs extended the lead to 4-0 after an unassisted goal with just over three minutes remaining in the period. With only 42 seconds remaining, Russia's Vladislav Mikhailov spoiled the shutout bid, as he beat Andree with his shot. The final score of the game was 4-1 for the OHL, as the CHL took a lead of five points to four after this game in the series.

Quinton Byfield of the Sudbury Wolves was named the OHL Player of the Game, as he recorded two assists. Vasily Podkolzin was named the Player of the Game for Russia. Attendance for the game was 7,436.

| November 7 | Russia | 1 – 4 | OHL | Kitchener Memorial Auditorium | Recap |
| No scoring | | First period | 5:12 - pp - Ty Dellandrea (1); 8:35 - Cole Perfetti (1) |
| No scoring | | Second period | 6:40 - Connor McMichael (1) |
| Vladislav Mikhailov (1) - 19:18 | | Third period | 16:50 - Akil Thomas (1) |
| Daniil Isayev (30 saves / 34 shots) | | Goalie stats | (13 saves / 13 shots) Nico Daws (13 saves / 14 shots) Cedrick Andree |

=== London ===
The fourth game of the series was played at Budweiser Gardens in London, Ontario on November 11. The CHL held a five points to four lead over Russia heading into the game. Kitchener Rangers head coach Jay McKee, who was an assistant coach for the OHL for game three, was not available for this game of the series. Dale Hunter of the London Knights remained the head coach, and was assisted by Ottawa 67's head coach Andre Tourigny and by London Knights assistant coach Dylan Hunter.

The OHL took a 1–0 lead in the game, as Connor McMichael of the London Knights beat Russia goaltender Amir Miftakhov. The OHL took this lead into the first intermission, as goaltender Hunter Jones of the Peterborough Petes stopped all seven shots he saw.

The two clubs skated to a score less second period, as Jones stopped all 10 shots he faced for the OHL, while Russia's Miftakhov stopped seven. Late in the second period, Serron Noel of the Oshawa Generals took a four minute high-sticking penalty, giving Russia the extended power play.

Russia made Noel pay for his penalty, as early in the third period, Rodion Amirov tied the game with a power play goal at 2:36, making it 1-1. Less than two minutes later, Noel scored an unassisted goal for the OHL, as they regained the lead at 2–1. At 7:52, Russia's Ilya Kruglov took a delay of game penalty, sending the OHL back on the power play. Despite being shorthanded, Russia tied the game as Lev Komissarov beat Jones at 9:31, making the score 2-2. The game would remained tied and head into overtime.

In overtime, neither team scored, as Russia out shot the OHL 4-3 during the five minute extra period, sending the game into a shootout. In the first round of the shootout, McMichael missed on his shot, while Danil Savunov scored for Russia, giving them a 1–0 lead. In the second round, Cole Perfetti of the Saginaw Spirit scored for the OHL, however, Russia held on to the lead as Maxim Sorkin scored, making it 2–1. In the third round, Quinton Byfield of the Sudbury Wolves was stopped by Miftakov, while Ivan Morozov scored for Russia, extending their lead to 3–1. In the fourth round of the shootout, the OHL must score to extend it, however, Akil Thomas failed to score, as Russia took the shootout victory. This victory tied the series at six points each for the CHL and Russia.

Serron Noel of the Oshawa Generals was named the OHL Player of the Game, as he recorded a goal and five shots. Vasily Podkolzin was named the Player of the Game for Russia. Attendance for the game was 7,673.

| November 11 | Russia | 3 – 2 (SO) | OT | OHL | Budweiser Gardens | Recap |
| No scoring | | First period | | 13:42 - Connor McMichael (2) |
| No scoring | | Second period | | No scoring |
| Rodion Amirov (1) - pp - 2:34; Lev Komissarov (1) - sh - 9:21 | | Third period | | 4:23 - Serron Noel (1) |
| No scoring | | First overtime period | | No scoring |
| Amir Miftakhov (29 saves / 31 shots) | | Goalie stats | | (28 saves / 30 shots) Hunter Jones |

=== WHL ===
The 2019 CIBC Canada/Russia Series concluded with two games played against the WHL. The fifth game of the series was played at the SaskTel Centre in Saskatoon, Saskatchewan on November 13, as the WHL defeated Russia 2–1 in overtime to take an eight-point to seven lead in the series. In the final game of the series, held at the Art Hauser Centre in Prince Albert, Saskatchewan, Russia defeated the WHL 4–3 in a shootout, which tied the series at nine points each. This led to a second shootout to determine the winner of the series, as the WHL defeated Russia in the shootout, clinching the series victory for the CHL.

== 2020 IIHF World Junior Championship ==
The 2020 IIHF World Junior Championship is being held in Ostrava and Třinec, Czech Republic, starting on December 26, 2019. The tournament concluded on January 5, 2020. Seventeen OHL players were on five rosters in this tournament, including nine on Canada, three on the Czech Republic, two on Switzerland, two on the United States, and one player on Finland. Sweden had a former OHL player, as Rasmus Sandin, who played with the Sault Ste. Marie Greyhounds during the 2017-18, was on the roster.

=== Canada ===
The Canadian had nine current players on their roster that played in the OHL. The players on the Canadian team were: Kevin Bahl, (Ottawa 67's); Quinton Byfield, (Sudbury Wolves); Nico Daws, (Guelph Storm); Ty Dellandrea, (Flint Firebirds); Jamie Drysdale, (Erie Otters); Aidan Dudas, (Owen Sound Attack); Liam Foudy, (London Knights); Connor McMichael, (London Knights); and Akil Thomas, (Niagara IceDogs). Dale Hunter, the head coach of the London Knights, was the head coach of the Canadian team. Barrett Hayton, who played with the Sault Ste. Marie Greyhounds from 2016–19, currently plays with the Arizona Coyotes of the National Hockey League, was named captain of the team.

Hayton led the Canadian team in scoring, as he scored six goals and 12 points in seven games. McMichael scored five goals and seven points in seven games, ranking second on the club in goals. Dellandrea earned three goals and five points in seven games, while Foudy also scored three goals, while adding an assist for four points in seven games. Drysdale scored a goal and three points in seven games, ranking third among Canadian defensemen in the tournament in points. Thomas scored a goal and an assist in seven games. His lone goal was the gold medal winning goal for the team. Dudas earned two assists in seven games, while Byfield and Bahl each earned an assist in seven games. In goal, Daws appeared in two games, earning a 1–1 record with a 5.83 GAA and a .840 save percentage.

Canada finished the preliminary round with nine points, finishing in first place in Group B. In the playoff round, Canada defeated Slovakia 6–1 in the quarter-finals. In the semi-finals, the Canadians shutout Finland 5–0, earning a berth into the gold medal game. In the final game, Canada overcame a 3–1 deficit to defeat Russia 4–3, winning the gold medal for the eighteenth time in tournament history.

=== Czech Republic ===
The Czech Republic had three current OHL players on their roster. Jan Jeník, (Hamilton Bulldogs); Matej Pekar, (Barrie Colts); and Jaromir Pytlik, (Sault Ste. Marie Greyhounds) all made the roster of the team. Former OHL player, Petr Cajka, who played with the Erie Otters during the 2018-19 season, was also named to their roster. Cajka was a member of Genève-Servette HC of the National League in Switzerland at the time of the tournament.

Jenik suffered a season ending knee injury during the tournament. Prior to his injury, Jenik scored two goals, which ranked him second on the team, as well as earning an assist for three points in three games. Cajka scored a goal in five games for the team, while both Pytlik and Pekar each earned an assist in five games.

The Czech Republic finished the preliminary round with four points, finishing in fourth place in Group B. The Czech Republic finished the tournament in seventh place as they lost to Sweden by a score of 5–0 in the quarter-finals.

=== Finland ===
Kari Piiroinen of the Windsor Spitfires was the only member of the OHL to be on the roster of Team Finland.

Piiroinen appeared in one game for Finland, earning a 1–0 record with a 1.00 GAA and a .955 save percentage.

Finland finished the preliminary round in third place in Group A, earning seven points. In the playoff round, Finland opened the quarter-finals with a 1–0 win over the United States. In the semi-finals, Finland lost to Canada 5–0, which sent the team to the bronze medal game. Finland finished the tournament in fourth place, as they lost the bronze medal game by a score of 3–2 against Sweden

=== Switzerland ===
Team Switzerland had two members of the OHL on their team roster. The players were Nico Gross, (Oshawa Generals); and Kyen Sopa, (Niagara IceDogs). Former OHL player Stephane Patry, who played with the Erie Otters during the 2017-18 season, was also named to the roster. At the time of the tournament, Patry played with Genève-Servette HC of the National League in Switzerland.

Gross scored a goal in three games for the team, while Sopa and Patry each earned an assist in five games.

Switzerland finished the preliminary round with nine points, finishing second in Group A standings. Switzerland finished the tournament in fifth place as they lost to Russia by a score of 3–1 in the quarter-finals.

=== United States ===
The United States had two players of the OHL on their roster. The players were Arthur Kaliyev, (Hamilton Bulldogs); and Nick Robertson, (Peterborough Petes).

Kaliyev tied for the team lead in goals, as he scored four goals in five games. Kaliyev also added two assists, earning six points, ranking him third in team scoring. Robertson scored two goals and three assists for five points in five games, as his point total ranked fourth on the team.

The USA finished the preliminary round with eight points, finishing in second place in Group B. In the quarter-finals, the USA lost to Finland 1–0, eliminating the team from the tournament. The USA finished in sixth place.

== 2020 IIHF U-20 Division 1A Championship ==
The 2020 IIHF U-20 Division 1A Championship was held in Minsk, Belarus from December 9 until December 15, 2019. Five current OHL players were on two teams in this tournament.

=== Austria ===
David Maier of the Peterborough Petes was the only member of the OHL on the Austrian roster. Maier scored one goal and three assists for four points in five games, ranking him tied for fourth in team scoring.

Austria finished the tournament in first place with 12 points in five games. The team was promoted to the top division, and will compete at the 2021 IIHF World Junior Championship.

=== Belarus ===
Team Belarus had four OHL players on their roster. The players were Vladislav Kolyachonok, (Flint Firebirds); Evgeniy Oksentyuk, (Flint Firebirds); Vitali Pinchuk, (Kingston Frontenacs); and Ilya Solovyov, (Saginaw Spirit).

Among OHL players, Evgeniy Oksentyk was the scoring leader, as he scored a goal and six assists for seven points in five games. Oksentyk finished second on the team scoring list. Vitali Pinchuk scored two goals, which ranked him tied for the second highest on the club.

During the tournament, Belarus finished in third place, as they recorded 11 points in five games.

== Kubota CHL/NHL Top Prospects Game ==
The Kubota CHL/NHL Top Prospects Game is an annual event in which forty of the top NHL entry draft eligible prospects in the Canadian Hockey League play against each other in an all-star game format. The 2019-20 Kubota CHL/NHL Top Prospects Game was held at FirstOntario Centre in Hamilton, Ontario. Seventeen players from the OHL participated in the event.

=== Team Red ===
Team Red was coached by Rob Wilson of the Peterborough Petes. His assistant coach was Vince Laise, who works as an associate coach with the Hamilton Bulldogs. Ten players from the OHL were named to the roster. The players included were Quinton Byfield, Sudbury Wolves; Nico Daws, Guelph Storm; Jamie Drysdale, Erie Otters; Luke Evangelista, London Knights; Jean-Luc Foudy, Windsor Spitfires; Jacob Perreault, Sarnia Sting; Jack Quinn, Ottawa 67's; Marco Rossi, Ottawa 67's; Donovan Sebrango, Kitchener Rangers; and Antonio Stranges, London Knights.

Quinn was named the Team Red Player of the Game, as he recorded a first period goal for the team. Both Evangelista and Stranges earned assists for the team as Team Red lost the game 5–3.

=== Team White ===
Team White was coached by George Burnett of the Guelph Storm. His assistant coach was Trevor Letowski, who is the head coach of the Windsor Spitfires. Seven players from the OHL were named to the team. The players included were Brandon Coe of the North Bay Battalion; Will Cuylle, Windsor Spitfires; Tyson Foerster, Barrie Colts; Ryan O'Rourke, Sault Ste. Marie Greyhounds; Cole Perfetti, Saginaw Spirit; Jaromir Pytlik, Sault Ste. Marie Greyhounds; and Jack Thompson, Windsor Spitfires.

During the game, Foerster scored two goals for Team White, leading the club to a 5–3 victory. Foerster was named the Team White Player of the Game. Perfetti scored a goal and added an assist for two points in the game. Other OHL players who recorded a point were Coe and O'Rourke, who each earned an assist in the victory.

=== Game Summary ===
Jeremie Poirier of the Saint John Sea Dogs opened the scoring for Team Red at 3:58 of the first period. His goal was assisted by a pair of London Knights players, Luke Evangelista and Antonio Stranges. Just over two minutes later, Team White tied the game on a goal by Kaiden Guhle of the Red Deer Rebels. OHLers Cole Perfetti of the Windsor Spitfires and Brandon Coe of the North Bay Battalion earned assists. Before the end of the period, Jack Quinn of the Ottawa 67's scored with 1:53 remaining in the period, giving Team Red the 2–1 lead heading into the intermission. Jacob Perreault of the Sarnia Sting and Marco Rossi earned assists on the goal. Team Red goaltender Brock Gould of the Moose Jaw Warriors made 11 saves in the period, while Samuel Hlavaj of the Sherbrooke Phoenix made eight saves.

In the second period, Team White's Tyson Foerster of the Barrie Colts scored 2:03 into the period, tying the game 2-2, as Connor Zary of the Kamloops Blazers and Ryan O'Rourke earned assists. Just under eight minutes later, Foerster scored his second goal of the game, as Zary and Ridly Greig of the Brandon Wheat Kings earned assists, giving Team White their first lead of the game at 3–2. Fifteen seconds later, at 10:17 of the period, Team White made a goaltending change, as Hlavaj was relieved in favour of Dylan Garand of the Kamloops Blazers. Hlavaj made 11 saves on 13 shots. At 13:12 of the second period, Braden Schneider of the Brandon Wheat Kings scored for Team White, extending their lead to 4–2, as Foerster and Zary each earned assists on the goal. Team White took the 4–2 lead into the intermission. Team White also had a 26–17 lead on the shot clock after two periods.

Early in the third period, Team Red's Donovan Sebrango of the Kitchener Rangers and Team White's Will Cuylle of the Windsor Spitfires got into a fight, with each player receiving a five-minute major penalty. The score remained 4-2 late in the period, as Team Red pulled their goaltender for an extra attacker. That led to an unassisted empty net goal by Team White's Cole Perfetti, making the score 5–2. With one second left in the game, Team Red scored, as Dawson Mercer of the Chicoutimi Sagueneens scored, as Poirier and Justin Sourdif of the Vancouver Giants earned assists. The final score of the game was 5–3. Garand made 10 saves on 11 shots in relief for Team White, while Gould played the entire game for Team Red, making 27 saves on 31 shots.

Foerster was named the Team White Player of the Game, as he scored two goals and added an assist in the victory. Quinn was named the Team Red Player of the Game, as he scored a first period goal which temporarily gave Team Red a lead. Attendance for the game at FirstOntario Centre in Hamilton, Ontario was 6,436.

| January 16 | Team White | 5 – 3 | Team Red | FirstOntario Centre | Recap |
| Kaiden Guhle (1) - 6:17 | | First period | 3:58 - Jeremie Poirier (1); 18:07 - Jack Quinn (1) |
| Tyson Foerster (1) - 2:03; Tyson Foerster (2) - 10:02; Braden Schneider (1) - 13:12 | | Second period | No scoring |
| Cole Perfetti (1) - en - 17:18 | | Third period | 19:59 - Dawson Mercer (1) |
| Samuel Hlavaj (11 saves / 13 shots); Dylan Garand (10 saves / 11 shots) | | Goalie stats | (27 saves / 31 shots) Brock Gould |

| Preceded by 2018–19 OHL season | OHL seasons | Succeeded by 2020–21 OHL season |
