= Mick Michael (philatelist) =

British philatelist

Mick Michael

Albert Leonard "Mick" Michael (January 1912 – 7 November 1987) was a British philatelist who was added to the Roll of Distinguished Philatelists in 1978.

Michael's first employment in the stamp trade was with H.E. Wingfield, a firm which he eventually owned. In 1962 Wingfield joined with Stanley Gibbons and Michael became joint managing director of that firm and chairman six years later. He retired in 1987.
