= James McMichael =

James McMichael may refer to:

- James L. McMichael (born 1939), American poet
- James M. McMichael (1870–1944), American architect
