= Connor McMichael =

Canadian ice hockey player (born 2001)

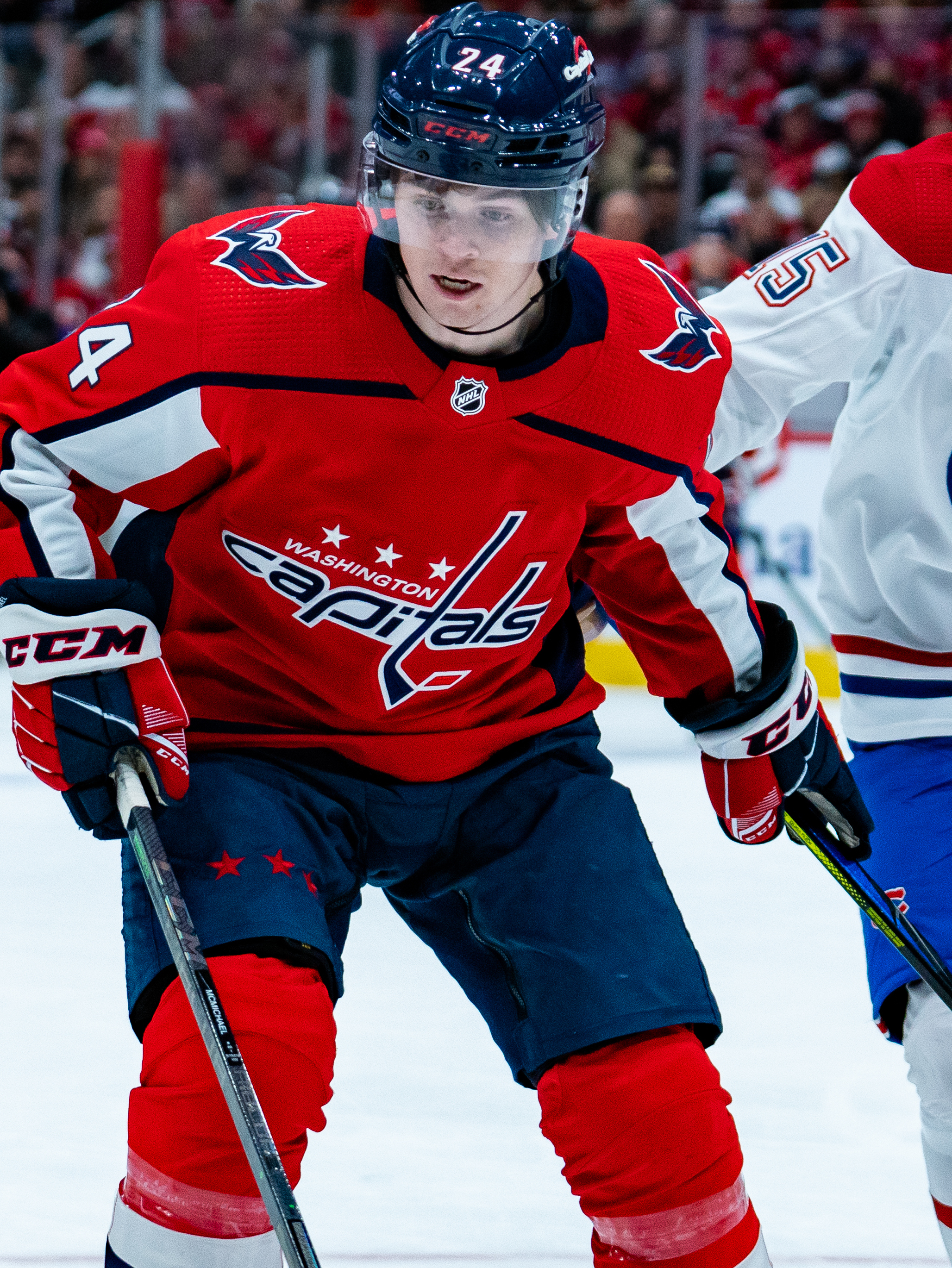
- McMichael with the Washington Capitals in 2021
- Born: January 15, 2001 (age 25) Ajax, Ontario, Canada
- Height: 6 ft 0 in (183 cm)
- Weight: 180 lb (82 kg; 12 st 12 lb)
- Position: Centre
- Shoots: Left
- NHL team Former teams: St. Louis Blues; Washington Capitals
- NHL draft: 25th overall, 2019; Washington Capitals
- Playing career: 2021–present

Connor McMichael (born January 15, 2001) is a Canadian professional ice hockey player who is a centre for the St. Louis Blues of the National Hockey League (NHL). He was selected by the Washington Capitals with the 25th overall pick in the 2019 NHL entry draft.

== Playing career ==
=== Junior ===
==== Hamilton Bulldogs (2017–18) ====
McMichael was drafted by the Hamilton Bulldogs in the first round, eleventh overall, during the 2017 OHL Priority Draft. McMichael made his debut with the Bulldogs on September 23, 2017, and he was held to no points in a 4–1 loss to the Niagara IceDogs. Two games later, on September 29, McMichael earned his first career OHL point, an assist on a goal by Isaac Nurse in a 2–0 win over the Mississauga Steelheads. McMichael would have to wait until his 24th career game to score his first goal, as he scored against Cameron Lamour of the Saginaw Spirit in a 7–1 victory on December 9. On December 17, McMichael scored a goal and an assist for his first career multi-point game in a 5–2 win over the Peterborough Petes. On January 8, 2018, the Bulldogs traded McMichael to the London Knights for Robert Thomas and five draft picks. In 32 games with the Bulldogs during the 2017–18 season, McMichael scored five goals and 10 points.

==== London Knights (2018–2020) ====
McMichael finished his rookie season in the OHL with the London Knights. He made his debut with the Knights on January 11, 2018, and he was held to no points in a 5–1 loss to the Kitchener Rangers. McMichael scored his first goal with London on January 14 against Luke Richardson in a 2–1 win over the Rangers. In 28 games with the Knights, McMichael scored three goals and six points. On March 22, McMichael played in his first career OHL playoff game, and he had no points in a 5–4 loss to the Owen Sound Attack. In four playoff games, McMichael had no points.

McMichael saw his offensive production increase dramatically during the 2018–19 season. In his first game of the season on September 21, McMichael had his first career multi-goal game in his OHL career, scoring two goals and adding an assist in a 5–2 win over the Windsor Spitfires. On November 30, McMichael scored his first career OHL hat trick, scoring three goals against Daniel Murphy in an 8–1 win over the Erie Otters. One week later, on December 7, McMichael recorded his first career four point game, scoring two goals and adding two assists in an 8–1 win over the Kingston Frontenacs. Nine days later, on December 16, McMichael had another four point game in a 5–3 win over the Otters. McMichael finished the regular season leading the Knights with 36 goals and 72 points. On March 24, McMichael scored his first career post-season goal, scoring against Colton Incze of the Windsor Spitfires in a 5–0 victory. On April 7, McMichael had his first career multi-point game in the post-season, earning two assists in a 7–0 victory against the Guelph Storm. In 11 playoff games, McMichael scored two goals and five points.

McMichael was drafted by the Washington Capitals in the first round, 25th overall at the 2019 NHL entry draft held in Vancouver, British Columbia. On July 13, 2019, McMichael was signed to a three-year, entry-level contract with the Capitals.

=== Professional ===
==== Washington Capitals (2021–2026) ====
McMichael made his NHL debut on January 24, 2021, against the Buffalo Sabres. That would be the only game he would play in during the 2020–21 NHL season as he was sent down to the Capitals' AHL affiliate, the Hershey Bears for the remainder of the season. However, McMichael would make the Capitals 2021–22 roster out of training camp. He scored his first NHL goal against the Florida Panthers on November 4, 2021.

On July 1, 2024, McMichael signed a two-year contract extension with the Capitals, carrying an average annual value of $2.1 million.

==== St. Louis Blues (2026–present) ====
On June 23, 2026, McMichael was traded to the St. Louis Blues along with Milton Gästrin and a 2026 first-round pick in exchange for Jordan Kyrou. As a restricted free agent, McMichael was signed to a six-year, $40.5 million contract extension with the Blues on July 16, 2026.

== Personal life ==
McMichael and his wife Lene have one son. They were married on August 1, 2026.

== Career statistics ==
Medal record

Men's ice hockey

Representing Canada

World Junior Championships
Gold medal – first place	2020 Czech Republic	
Silver medal – second place	2021 Canada	

=== Regular season and playoffs ===
			Regular season					Playoffs
Season	Team	League	GP	G	A	Pts	PIM	GP	G	A	Pts	PIM
2016–17	St. Michael's Buzzers	OJHL	1	0	0	0	0	—	—	—	—	—
2017–18	Hamilton Bulldogs	OHL	32	5	5	10	10	—	—	—	—	—
2017–18	London Knights	OHL	28	3	3	6	4	4	0	0	0	0
2018–19	London Knights	OHL	67	36	36	72	19	11	2	3	5	2
2019–20	London Knights	OHL	52	47	55	102	26	—	—	—	—	—
2020–21	Washington Capitals	NHL	1	0	0	0	2	—	—	—	—	—
2020–21	Hershey Bears	AHL	33	14	13	27	14	—	—	—	—	—
2021–22	Washington Capitals	NHL	68	9	9	18	10	4	0	1	1	0
2022–23	Washington Capitals	NHL	6	0	0	0	5	—	—	—	—	—
2022–23	Hershey Bears	AHL	57	16	23	39	12	20	6	4	10	6
2023–24	Washington Capitals	NHL	80	18	15	33	34	4	1	0	1	2
2024–25	Washington Capitals	NHL	82	26	31	57	49	10	4	2	6	2
2025–26	Washington Capitals	NHL	78	14	32	46	30	—	—	—	—	—
NHL totals			315	67	87	154	130	18	5	3	8	4

=== International ===
Year	Team	Event	Result	GP	G	A	Pts	PIM
2017	Canada White	U17	4th	6	1	3	4	0
2020	Canada	WJC	1st place, gold medalist(s)	7	5	2	7	0
2021	Canada	WJC	2nd place, silver medalist(s)	7	4	4	8	4
Junior totals				20	10	9	19	4

== Awards and honours ==
Award	Year	Ref
OHL
OHL Second All-Star Team	2020	
AHL
All-Rookie Team	2021	
North Division All-Star Team	2021	
Calder Cup champion	2023	

Awards and achievements
Preceded by Alexander Alexeyev	Washington Capitals first-round draft pick 2019	Succeeded by Hendrix Lapierre
