= Lokelani McMichael =

American triathlete, surfer and model

Lokelani McMichael (born in Kailua Kona, Hawaii) is an American triathlete, surfer and model. In October 1995, she became the youngest female to finish the Hawaii Ironman. McMichael has been featured in GQ, Shape, Triathlete, Runner's World, Men's Health and several other magazines. She has made television appearances on Beyond the Break and Ironman Live. She was Miss Kona Coffee in 1999.

Her parents have run a popular surf shop in Kailua-Kona (home of the Ironman) and provided water safety for the swim portion for many years.

Lokelani McMichael, whose real name is Lokelaniku'uleimakamae, entered her first Ironman triathlon in 1995. She was 18 years old, and she beat out about 48,000 people to become eligible for one of the 2,000 or so spots in the 140.6-mile triathlon. The achievement also put her into the Guinness Book of World Records as the youngest woman ever to finish the Ironman.
