= Quinton Byfield =

Canadian ice hockey player (born 2002)

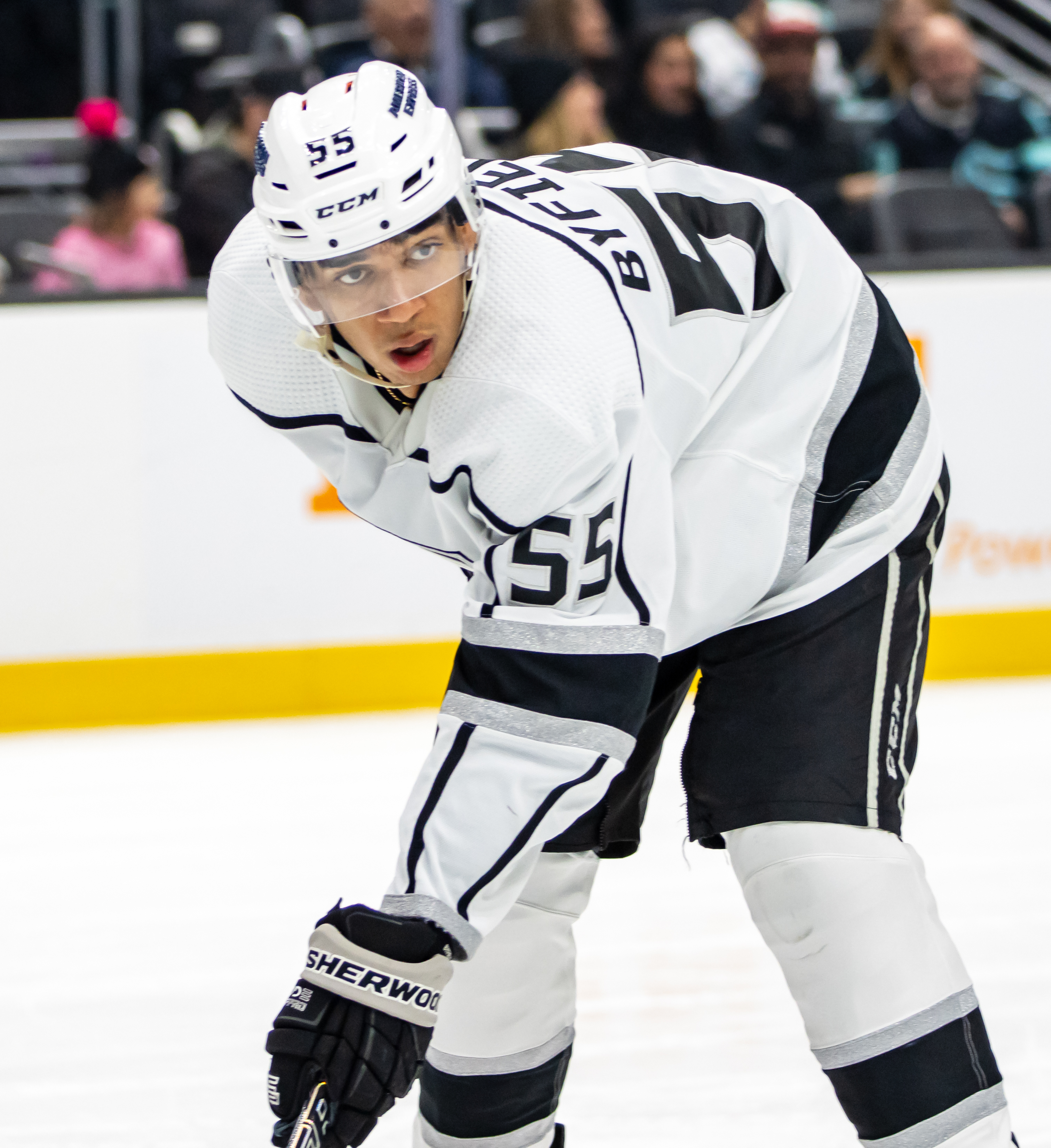
- Byfield with the Los Angeles Kings in 2023
- Born: August 19, 2002 (age 24) Newmarket, Ontario, Canada
- Height: 6 ft 5 in (196 cm)
- Weight: 230 lb (104 kg; 16 st 6 lb)
- Position: Forward
- Shoots: Left
- NHL team: Los Angeles Kings
- NHL draft: 2nd overall, 2020; Los Angeles Kings
- Playing career: 2021–present

Quinton Byfield (born August 19, 2002) is a Canadian professional ice hockey player who is a forward for the Los Angeles Kings of the National Hockey League (NHL). Byfield was selected second overall by the Kings in the 2020 NHL entry draft, the highest-drafted black player in NHL history. He made his NHL debut with the Kings in 2021.

== Early life ==
Byfield is the son of Clinton Byfield, who is Jamaican, and Nicole Kasper, who is Canadian. His parents met when his mom was a student at the University of Toronto and his dad had just moved from Jamaica to Toronto. He was raised with his oldest sister, Chloe, in a Toronto suburb, and also has an older half-sister. Although neither his mom nor dad played hockey when they were younger, his parents built an ice rink in their backyard so that his friends and he could play hockey. He attended St. Maximilian Kolbe Catholic High School and was part of the class of 2020.

As a teenager, Byfield was named the 2002 Division's All-Tournament Most Valuable Player At Pro-Am's 2015 Mini Chowder Cup. At the age of 15, he played AAA hockey in the Toronto area and first met former NHL player Gary Roberts, who encouraged him to join his training and development program.

== Career ==
Byfield was drafted first overall by the Sudbury Wolves in the 2018 OHL draft and won both OHL Rookie of the Year and CHL Rookie of the Year. In 2018–19, he put up 29 goals and 61 points in 64 games.

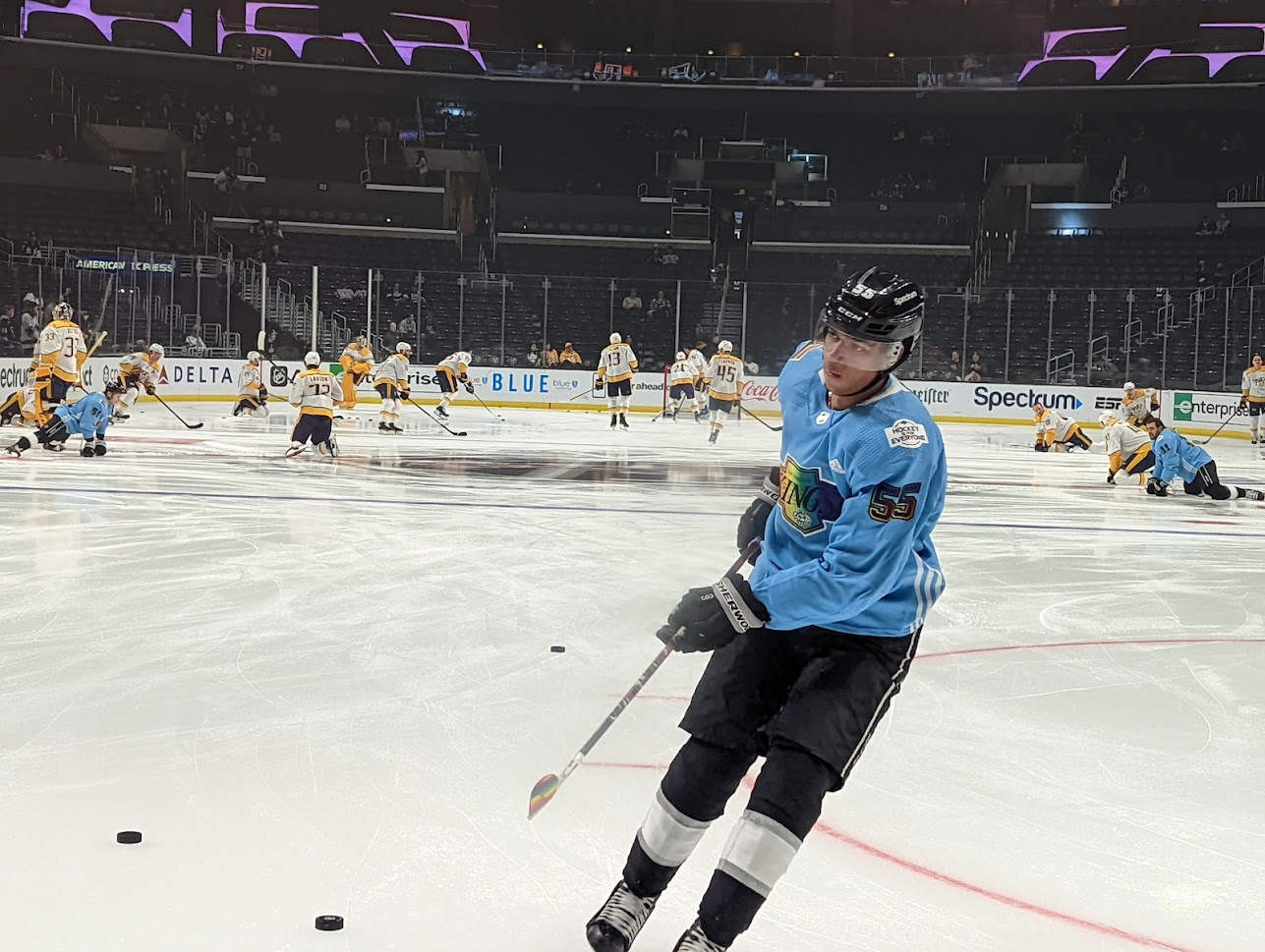
Byfield during warmups on Los Angeles Kings Pride night in 2022

After his second overall selection in the 2020 NHL entry draft, Byfield was signed by the Los Angeles Kings to a three-year, entry-level contract on October 16, 2020. He was assigned to the Kings' American Hockey League (AHL) roster to begin the 2020–21 season where he played on a line with Akil Thomas and Devante Smith-Pelly. His line became the first all-Black line in professional ice hockey since Herb Carnegie, Ossie Carnegie, and Manny McIntyre in the 1940s. During their first game together, Thomas recorded a natural hat-trick and his line combined for six points in the eventual win. On April 28, 2021, Byfield made his NHL debut in a 3–2 loss to the Anaheim Ducks. He recorded his first NHL point on May 5, 2021, in a 4–2 win over the Arizona Coyotes.

In October 2021, Byfield fractured his ankle, keeping him from joining the Kings. Byfield eventually returned to the NHL level on January 20, 2022. He scored his first NHL goal in a matchup against the New York Islanders on January 27, in a 3–2 win over the New York Islanders. On April 25, 2023, Byfield scored his first NHL playoff goal in a 6–3 loss to the Edmonton Oilers. On July 15, 2024, Byfield, a restricted free agent, signed a five-year, $31.25 million contract extension with the Kings.

== International play ==
Medal record

Men's ice hockey

Representing Canada

World Junior Championships
Gold medal – first place	2020 Czech Republic	
Silver medal – second place	2021 Canada	

Byfield won a silver medal at the 2019 Hlinka Gretzky Cup. Byfield won a Gold Medal with Canada at the 2020 World Junior Championships held in the Czech Republic, posting one assist in seven games. Byfield won a silver medal with Canada at the 2021 World Junior Championships held in Canada, posting two goals and five assists for seven points in seven games.

== Career statistics ==
=== Regular season and playoffs ===
			Regular season					Playoffs
Season	Team	League	GP	G	A	Pts	PIM	GP	G	A	Pts	PIM
2017–18	Newmarket Hurricanes	OJHL	1	1	1	2	0	—	—	—	—	—
2018–19	Sudbury Wolves	OHL	64	29	32	61	38	8	3	5	8	16
2019–20	Sudbury Wolves	OHL	45	32	50	82	44	—	—	—	—	—
2020–21	Ontario Reign	AHL	32	8	12	20	24	1	0	0	0	0
2020–21	Los Angeles Kings	NHL	6	0	1	1	2	—	—	—	—	—
2021–22	Ontario Reign	AHL	11	4	2	6	10	—	—	—	—	—
2021–22	Los Angeles Kings	NHL	40	5	5	10	20	2	0	0	0	4
2022–23	Ontario Reign	AHL	16	9	6	15	18	—	—	—	—	—
2022–23	Los Angeles Kings	NHL	53	3	19	22	30	6	1	3	4	2
2023–24	Los Angeles Kings	NHL	80	20	35	55	42	5	0	4	4	4
2024–25	Los Angeles Kings	NHL	81	23	31	54	46	6	3	1	4	2
2025–26	Los Angeles Kings	NHL	79	24	25	49	46	4	0	2	2	6
NHL totals			339	75	116	191	186	23	4	10	14	18

=== International ===
Year	Team	Event	GP	G	A	Pts	PIM
2018	Canada Black	U17	5	2	1	3	12
2019	Canada	HG18	5	3	2	5	4
2020	Canada	WJC	7	0	1	1	4
2021	Canada	WJC	7	2	5	7	4
Junior totals			24	7	9	16	24

== Awards and honours ==
Award	Year	Ref
OHL
Emms Family Award	2019	
CHL
CHL Rookie of the Year	2019	

== See also ==
- Black players in ice hockey

Awards and achievements
Preceded by Tobias Björnfot	Los Angeles Kings first-round draft pick 2020	Succeeded by Brandt Clarke
