= 2021–22 OHL season =

- League: Ontario Hockey League
- Sport: Hockey
- Duration: Preseason; September 2021 - October 2021; Regular season October 7, 2021 – April 17, 2022; Playoffs; April 21, 2022 – June 15, 2022
- Teams: 20
- TV partner(s): Rogers TV; Shaw TV; YourTV; TSN; CBC

Draft
- Top draft pick: Quentin Musty
- Picked by: Sudbury Wolves

Regular season
- Hamilton Spectator Trophy: Hamilton Bulldogs (1)
- Season MVP: Wyatt Johnston (Windsor Spitfires)
- Top scorer: Wyatt Johnston (Windsor Spitfires)

Playoffs
- Playoffs MVP: Logan Morrison (Bulldogs)
- Finals champions: Hamilton Bulldogs
- Runners-up: Windsor Spitfires

OHL seasons
- 2020–21 (cancelled) 2022–23

2021–22 CHL season
- League: Canadian Hockey League
- Sport: Hockey
- Duration: OHL; October 2021 – June 2022; QMJHL; October 2021 – June 2022; WHL; October 2021 – June 2022
- Teams: 60
- TV partner(s): RDS; TSN; CBC; Rogers TV; Shaw TV
- Season MVP: Logan Stankoven (Kamloops Blazers) (WHL)
- Top scorer: Wyatt Johnston (Windsor Spitfires) (OHL)

Memorial Cup
- Finals champions: Saint John Sea Dogs (QMJHL) (2nd title)
- Runners-up: Hamilton Bulldogs (OHL)

The 2021–22 OHL season was the 42nd season of operation (41st season of play) of the Ontario Hockey League. After the 2020–21 OHL season was cancelled due to the COVID-19 pandemic, the league played a full 68-game regular season having begun on October 7, 2021, and concluded on April 17, 2022. The post-season began on April 21, 2022 and concluded on June 15, 2022.

The Hamilton Bulldogs won the J. Ross Robertson Cup and advanced to the 2022 Memorial Cup final, to face the host team Saint John Sea Dogs of the QMJHL at TD Station in Saint John, New Brunswick.

== Broadcast rights ==
On July 21, 2021, the CHL announced a new multi-year broadcast rights partnership with TSN, RDS and the CBC beginning in the 2021-22 season. The new partnership includes approximately 30 regular season games each year delivered by TSN, approximately 20 French-language broadcast games on RDS, early season weekend games broadcast by CBC Sports, as well as digital streaming rights featuring a CHL TV broadcast each week during the regular season on TSN, RDS, and the CBC Gem streaming service.

== Hamilton Outdoor Showcase ==
On March 14, 2022, the Hamilton Bulldogs hosted the Hamilton Outdoor Showcase at Tim Hortons Field against their East Division rivals, the Oshawa Generals. The Bulldogs shutout the Generals 3-0 in front of 12,587 fans. This marked the fourth outdoor game in OHL history and was the first time since 2017 that the league hosted an outdoor game.

== Regular season ==
=== Final standings ===
Note: DIV = Division; GP = Games played; W = Wins; L = Losses; OTL = Overtime losses; SL = Shootout losses; GF = Goals for; GA = Goals against;
PTS = Points; x = clinched playoff berth; y = clinched division title; z = clinched conference title

=== Eastern conference ===
Rank	Team	DIV	GP	W	L	OTL	SOL	Pts	ROW	GF	GA
1	z-Hamilton Bulldogs	East	68	51	12	3	2	107	47	300	176
2	y-North Bay Battalion	Central	68	43	18	3	4	93	40	267	198
3	x-Kingston Frontenacs	East	68	41	22	4	1	87	37	285	242
4	x-Mississauga Steelheads	Central	68	37	23	2	6	82	36	229	189
5	x-Barrie Colts	Central	68	34	27	6	1	75	32	245	236
6	x-Oshawa Generals	East	68	30	31	2	5	67	24	215	241
7	x-Ottawa 67's	East	68	28	31	2	7	65	24	199	250
8	x-Peterborough Petes	East	68	29	33	5	1	64	28	240	281
9	Sudbury Wolves	Central	68	23	38	3	4	53	21	223	297
10	Niagara IceDogs	Central	68	22	42	3	1	48	16	218	316

=== Western conference ===
Rank	Team	DIV	GP	W	L	OTL	SOL	Pts	ROW	GF	GA
1	z-Windsor Spitfires	West	68	44	17	4	3	95	41	305	248
2	y-London Knights	Midwest	68	39	22	5	2	85	35	264	232
3	x-Flint Firebirds	West	68	42	21	1	4	89	41	286	238
4	x-Sault Ste. Marie Greyhounds	West	68	39	22	6	1	85	37	295	245
5	x-Guelph Storm	Midwest	68	36	24	5	3	80	33	251	228
6	x-Owen Sound Attack	Midwest	68	34	26	5	3	76	32	235	245
7	x-Kitchener Rangers	Midwest	68	30	31	5	2	67	29	236	271
8	x-Sarnia Sting	West	68	27	36	4	1	59	26	234	279
9	Erie Otters	Midwest	68	27	37	2	2	58	26	223	267
10	Saginaw Spirit	West	68	24	43	1	0	49	21	234	305

=== Scoring leaders ===
Note: GP = Games played; G = Goals; A = Assists; Pts = Points; PIM = Penalty minutes

Player	Team	GP	G	A	Pts	PIM
Wyatt Johnston	Windsor Spitfires	68	46	78	124	26
Rory Kerins	Sault Ste. Marie Greyhounds	67	43	75	118	49
Lucas Edmonds	Kingston Frontenacs	68	34	79	113	14
Luke Evangelista	London Knights	62	55	56	111	48
Brandon Coe	North Bay Battalion	62	34	67	101	40
Logan Morrison	Hamilton Bulldogs	60	34	66	100	8
Brennan Othmann	Flint Firebirds	66	50	47	97	65
Shane Wright	Kingston Frontenacs	63	32	62	94	22
Matvey Petrov	North Bay Battalion	63	40	50	90	28
Mitchell Russell	North Bay Battalion	64	41	47	88	26

=== Leading goaltenders ===
Note: GP = Games played; Mins = Minutes played; W = Wins; L = Losses: OTL = Overtime losses;
SL = Shootout losses; GA = Goals Allowed; SO = Shutouts; GAA = Goals against average

Player	Team	GP	MINS	W	L	OTL	SOL	GA	SO	Sv%	GAA
Marco Costantini	Hamilton Bulldogs	45	2667	31	9	2	2	103	6	0.917	2.32
Roman Basran	Mississauga Steelheads	45	2541	21	14	1	6	110	2	0.896	2.60
Mack Guzda	Owen Sound/Barrie	41	2370	25	13	2	1	106	2	0.915	2.68
Brett Brochu	London Knights	43	2510	29	11	2	0	115	2	0.911	2.75
Joe Vrbetic	North Bay Battalion	45	2631	29	10	3	3	126	2	0.906	2.87

== Attendance ==
Team	Arena	Home Games	Avg. Attendance	Capacity	Capacity Percentage
London Knights	Budweiser Gardens	34	7,109	9,036	78.7%
Kitchener Rangers	Kitchener Memorial Auditorium	34	4,106	7,131	57.6%
Oshawa Generals	Tribute Communities Centre	34	3,669	5,180	70.1%
Niagara IceDogs	Meridian Centre	34	3,547	5,300	66.7%
Saginaw Spirit	Dow Event Center	34	3,226	5,527	63.9%
Guelph Storm	Sleeman Centre	34	3,192	4,715	67.7%
Hamilton Bulldogs	FirstOntario Centre	34	3,079	17,383	17.7%
Windsor Spitfires	WFCU Centre	34	3,032	6,450	47.0%
Erie Otters	Erie Insurance Arena	34	3,005	6,716	44.7%
Kingston Frontenacs	Leon's Centre	34	2,698	5,614	48.1%
Sarnia Sting	Progressive Auto Sales Arena	34	2,627	4,118	63.8%
Ottawa 67's	TD Place Arena	34	2,619	8,585	30.5%
Sault Ste. Marie Greyhounds	GFL Memorial Gardens	34	2,619	4,928	53.1%
Flint Firebirds	Dort Financial Center	34	2,464	4,365	56.4%
Barrie Colts	Sadlon Arena	34	2,462	4,195	58.7%
Peterborough Petes	Peterborough Memorial Centre	34	2,078	3,729	55.7%
Sudbury Wolves	Sudbury Community Arena	34	2,061	4,640	44.4%
Owen Sound Attack	Bayshore Community Centre	34	2,037	3,500	58.2%
North Bay Battalion	North Bay Memorial Gardens	34	1,817	4,262	42.6%
Mississauga Steelheads	Paramount Fine Foods Centre	34	1,413	5,420	26.1%

== Playoffs ==
Conference quarterfinals	Conference semifinals
1	Hamilton	4
8	Peterborough	0
1	Hamilton	4
4	Mississauga	0
4	Mississauga	4
5	Barrie	2
Eastern Conference
2	North Bay	4
7	Ottawa	0
2	North Bay	4
3	Kingston	1
3	Kingston	4
6	Oshawa	2
1	Windsor	4
8	Sarnia	2
1	Windsor	4
7	Kitchener	1
2	London	3
7	Kitchener	4
Western Conference
3	Flint	4
6	Owen Sound	3
3	Flint	4
4	Sault Ste. Marie	1
4	Sault Ste. Marie	4
5	Guelph	1

Conference finals
1	Hamilton	4
2	North Bay	0
1	Windsor	4
3	Flint	3

Finals
E1	Hamilton	4
W1	Windsor	3

=== Conference quarterfinals ===
==== Eastern conference quarterfinals ====
===== (1) Hamilton Bulldogs vs. (8) Peterborough Petes =====
April 21	Peterborough Petes	2 – 5	Hamilton Bulldogs	FirstOntario Centre	Recap
No scoring		First period	No scoring
Brian Zanetti (1) - pp - 16:36		Second period	2:00 - pp - Arber Xhekaj (1); 4:20 - Mason MacTavish (1); 7:03 - Brenden Anderson (1); 18:47 - pp - Logan Morrison (1)
Donovan McCoy (1) - 2:50		Third period	8:03 - pp - Logan Morrison (2)
Michael Simpson (0-1) (36 saves / 41 shots)		Goalie stats	Marco Costantini (1-0) (20 saves / 22 shots)

April 25	Peterborough Petes	2 – 5	Hamilton Bulldogs	FirstOntario Centre	Recap
Joe Carroll (1) - 2:57; Tucker Robertson (1) - sh - 9:17		First period	18:12 - Giordano Biondi (1); 19:54 - pp - Logan Morrison (3)
No scoring		Second period	14:37 - Gavin White (1); 16:28 - pp - Logan Morrison (4)
No scoring		Third period	3:21 - Logan Morrison (5)
Michael Simpson (0-2) (50 saves / 55 shots)		Goalie stats	Marco Costantini (2-0) (18 saves / 20 shots)

April 27	Hamilton Bulldogs	7 – 2	Peterborough Petes	Peterborough Memorial Centre	Recap
Mason McTavish (2) - pp - 17:30		First period	No scoring
Avery Hayes (1) - pp - 1:48; Mason McTavish (3) - pp - 11:59		Second period	6:31 - Tucker Robertson (2)
Ryan Winterton (1) - pp - 3:34; Giordano Biondi (2) - 5:45; Logan Morrison (6) - 12:12; Avery Hayes (2) - pp - 12:45		Third period	7:08 - Sam Alfano (1)
Marco Constantini (3-0) (23 saves / 25 shots)		Goalie stats	Michael Simpson (0-3) (21 saves / 28 shots)

April 28	Hamilton Bulldogs	7 – 3	Peterborough Petes	Peterborough Memorial Centre	Recap
Mason McTavish (4) - 1:49; George Diaco (1) - pp - 8:43; Nathan Staios (1) - pp - 11:32; Arber Xhekaj (2) - 13:06		First period	No scoring
Jorian Donovan (1) - 17:18		Second period	8:02 - pp - Joe Carroll (2); 10:53 - sh - Emmett Sproule (1); 18:08 - Tucker Robertson (3)
Mason McTavish (5) - pp - 11:51; Lawson Sherk (1) - sh - en - 17:32		Third period	No scoring
Marco Constantini (4-0) (28 saves / 31 shots)		Goalie stats	Michael Simpson (0-4) (24 saves / 30 shots)

Hamilton wins series 4 – 0

===== (2) North Bay Battalion vs. (7) Ottawa 67's =====
April 21	Ottawa 67's	1 – 4	North Bay Battalion	North Bay Memorial Gardens	Recap
No scoring		First period	No scoring
No scoring		Second period	11:05 - pp - Mitchell Russell (1)
Jack Beck (1) - sh - 3:30		Third period	5:58 - Mitchell Russell (2); 9:33 - Owen Van Steensel (1); 18:46 - en - sh - Paul Christopoulos (1)
Max Donoso (0-1) (28 saves / 31 shots)		Goalie stats	Joe Vrbetic (1-0) (26 saves / 27 shots)

April 23	Ottawa 67's	6 – 7	North Bay Battalion	North Bay Memorial Gardens	Recap
Chris Barlas (1) - 5:29; Tyler Boucher (1) - 6:11; Brady Stonehouse (1) - 9:51		First period	1:24 - Mitchell Russell (3); 14:59 - Avery Winslow (1); 15:44 - Kyle McDonald (1)
Jack Beck (2) - 4:54; Jack Matier (1) - 12:59		Second period	3:07 - Anthony Romani (1); 14:37 - pp - Kyle Jackson (1)
Luca Pinelli (1) - 5:36		Third period	15:56 - Brandon Coe (1); 19:57 - Brandon Coe (2)
Max Donoso (3 saves / 6 shots); Will Cranley (0-1) (21 saves / 25 shots)		Goalie stats	Joe Vrbetic (23 saves / 29 shots)

April 25	North Bay Battalion	3 – 2	OT	Ottawa 67's	TD Place Arena	Recap
Kyle McDonald (2) - 0:23		First period		No scoring
No scoring		Second period		No scoring
Kyle Jackson (2) - 4:18		Third period		16:55 - Jack Beck (3); 18:22 - Cameron Tolnai (1)
Brandon Coe (3) - 4:55		First overtime period		No scoring
Joe Vrbetic (3-0) (32 saves / 34 shots)		Goalie stats		Max Donoso (0-2) (33 saves / 36 shots)

April 27	North Bay Battalion	3 – 2	Ottawa 67's	TD Place Arena	Recap
Kyle Jackson (3) - 8:35		First period	13:07 - pp - Luca Pinelli (2)
No scoring		Second period	3:49 - Vinzenz Rohrer (1)
Avery Winslow (2) - pp - 7:15; Mitchell Russell (4) - 12:19		Third period	No scoring
Joe Vrbetic (4-0) (22 saves / 24 shots)		Goalie stats	Max Donoso (0-3) (29 saves / 32 shots)

North Bay wins series 4 – 0

===== (3) Kingston Frontenacs vs. (6) Oshawa Generals =====
April 22	Oshawa Generals	1 – 6	Kingston Frontenacs	Leon's Centre	Recap
Cameron Butler (1) - 7:16		First period	16:45 - Paul Ludwinski (1)
No scoring		Second period	2:49 - Jake Murray (1); 6:13 - Lucas Edmonds (1)
No scoring		Third period	3:30 - Francesco Arcuri (1); 10:22 - sh - Paul Ludwinski (2); 19:54 - pp - Jackson Stewart (1)
Patrick Leaver (0-1) (22 saves / 28 shots)		Goalie stats	Leevi Meriläinen (1-0) (22 saves / 23 shots)

April 24	Oshawa Generals	4 – 6	Kingston Frontenacs	Leon's Centre	Recap
No scoring		First period	5:04 - Lucas Edmonds (2); 14:07 - Paul Ludwinski (3); 15:06 - Jordan Frasca (1)
No scoring		Second period	1:28 - Jordan Frasca (2)
Dawson McKinney (1) - 3:47; Ryan Gagnier (1) - pp - 6:56; Jordyn Ertel (1) - 7:19; Brett Harrison (1) - 18:30		Third period	2:35 - Gage Heyes (1); 10:59 - Jake Murray (2)
Patrick Leaver (1 save / 4 shots); Zachary Paputsakis (0-1) (13 saves / 16 shots)		Goalie stats	Leevi Meriläinen (2-0) (33 saves / 37 shots)

April 26	Kingston Frontenacs	3 – 4	Oshawa Generals	Tribute Communities Centre	Recap
No scoring		First period	17:40 - pp - Stuart Rolofs (1)
Zayde Wisdom (1) - 13:13; Zayde Wisdom (2) - 17:02; Lucas Peric (1) - 19:50		Second period	No scoring
No scoring		Third period	6:33 - pp - Brett Harrison (2); 10:47 - Calum Ritchie (1); 19:52 - Lleyton Moore (1)
Leevi Meriläinen (2-1) (29 saves / 33 shots)		Goalie stats	Patrick Leaver (1-1) (32 saves / 35 shots)

April 28	Kingston Frontenacs	6 – 2	Oshawa Generals	Tribute Communities Centre	Recap
No scoring		First period	No scoring
Paul Ludwinski (4) - sh - 1:51; Zayde Wisdom (3) - 9:45		Second period	7:11 - pp - Brett Harrison (3); 15:11 - pp - Ty Tullio (1)
Shane Wright (1) - 3:19; Zayde Wisdom (4) - pp - 5:19; Lucas Edmonds (3) - 7:05; Paul Ludwinski (5) - 7:29		Third period	No scoring
Leevi Meriläinen (3-1) (31 saves / 33 shots)		Goalie stats	Patrick Leaver (1-2) (30 saves / 36 shots)

April 30	Oshawa Generals	3 – 1	Kingston Frontenacs	Leon's Centre	Recap
Oskar Olausson (1) - 16:16		First period	2:41 - pp - Jordan Frasca (3)
Calum Ritchie (3) - pp - 6:31; Brett Harrison (4) - pp - 12:30		Second period	No scoring
No scoring		Third period	No scoring
Patrick Leaver (2-2) (44 saves / 45 shots)		Goalie stats	Leevi Meriläinen (3-2) (19 saves / 22 shots)

May 1	Kingston Frontenacs	5 – 4	OT	Oshawa Generals	Tribute Communities Centre	Recap
Martin Chromiak (1) - pp - 19:32		First period		18:00 - pp - Lleyton Moore (1)
Braden Haché (1) - 1:13; Francesco Arcuri (2) - 1:47		Second period		No scoring
Alec Belanger (1) - 11:35		Third period		13:39 - Calum Ritchie (4); 14:40 - Ryan Gagnier (1); 19:58 - Ty Tullio (2)
Shane Wright (2) - 5:12		First overtime period		No scoring
Leevi Meriläinen (4-2) (27 saves / 31 shots)		Goalie stats		Patrick Leaver (2-3) (32 saves / 37 shots)

Kingston wins series 4 – 2

===== (4) Mississauga Steelheads vs. (5) Barrie Colts =====
April 22	Barrie Colts	2 – 1	OT	Mississauga Steelheads	Paramount Fine Foods Centre	Recap
No scoring		First period		6:58 - James Hardie (1)
Ethan Cardwell (1) - 5:43		Second period		No scoring
No scoring		Third period		No scoring
Evan Vierling (1) - 16:24		First overtime period		No scoring
Mack Guzda (1-0) (38 saves / 39 shots)		Goalie stats		Roman Basran (0-1) (24 saves / 26 shots)

April 24	Barrie Colts	1 – 2	OT	Mississauga Steelheads	Paramount Fine Foods Centre	Recap
No scoring		First period		No scoring
No scoring		Second period		16:51 - pp - Ty Collins (1)
Cooper Matthews (1) - pp - 8:49		Third period		No scoring
No scoring		First overtime period		12:03 - Owen Beck (1)
Mack Guzda (1-1) (40 saves / 42 shots)		Goalie stats		Roman Basran (1-1) (31 saves / 32 shots)

April 25	Mississauga Steelheads	1 – 3	Barrie Colts	Sadlon Arena	Recap
James Hardie (2) - pp - 17:53		First period	13:10 - Connor Punnett (1); 16:19 - Ethan Cardwell (2)
No scoring		Second period	No scoring
No scoring		Third period	5:46 - Hunter Haight (1)
Roman Basran (1-2) (17 saves / 20 shots)		Goalie stats	Matteo Lalama (1-0) (28 saves / 29 shots)

April 27	Mississauga Steelheads	3 – 2	2OT	Barrie Colts	Sadlon Arena	Recap
James Hardie (3) - 0:39; Ole Bjorgvik-Holm (1) - 18:54		First period		10:45 - pp - Jacob Frasca (1)
No scoring		Second period		2:53 -pp - Tyson Foerster (1)
No scoring		Third period		No scoring
James Hardie (4) - pp - 9:10		Second overtime period		No scoring
Roman Basran (2-2) (31 saves / 33 shots)		Goalie stats		Matteo Lalama (1-1) (33 saves / 36 shots)

April 30	Barrie Colts	1 – 4	Mississauga Steelheads	Paramount Fine Foods Centre	Recap
No scoring		First period	9:22 - Jake Uberti (1)
No scoring		Second period	3:47 - pp - Chas Sharpe (1)
Declan McDonnell (1) - 10:01		Third period	14:09 - Zakary Lavoie (1); 18:32 - en - James Hardie (5)
Mack Guzda (1-2) (32 saves / 35 shots)		Goalie stats	Roman Basran (3-2) (18 saves / 19 shots)

May 2	Mississauga Steelheads	6 – 4	Barrie Colts	Sadlon Arena	Recap
Jake Uberti (2) - pp - 6:33; Zakary Lavoie (2) - 10:34		First period	No scoring
Zakary Lavoie (3) - pp - 5:21; Luca DelBelBelluz (1) - pp - 8:05; Ty Collins (2) - pp - 13:16		Second period	9:57 - Nathan Allensen (1)
James Hardie (6) - en - 18:10		Third period	6:36 - pp - Ethan Cardwell (3); 17:16 - Nathan Allensen (2); 17:41 - Ethan Cardwell (4)
Roman Basran (4-2) (33 saves / 37 shots)		Goalie stats	Mack Guzda (1-3) (33 saves / 38 shots)

Mississauga wins series 4 – 2

==== Western conference quarterfinals ====
===== (1) Windsor Spitfires vs. (8) Sarnia Sting =====
April 21	Sarnia Sting	0 – 3	Windsor Spitfires	WFCU Centre	Recap
No scoring		First period	13:20 - Alex Christopoulos (1)
No scoring		Second period	6:49 - James Jodoin (1)
No scoring		Third period	16:16 - Andrew Perrott (1)
Benjamin Gaudreau (0-1) (25 saves / 28 shots)		Goalie stats	Mathias Onuska (1-0) (11 saves / 11 shots)

April 23	Sarnia Sting	1 – 4	Windsor Spitfires	WFCU Centre	Recap
No scoring		First period	14:18 - Will Cuylle (1)
No scoring		Second period	No scoring
Nolan Dann (1) - 4:45		Third period	0:43 - Pasquale Zito (1); 11:10 - Daniel D'Amico (1); 19:42 - en - Will Cuylle (2)
Benjamin Gaudreau (0-2) (39 saves / 42 shots)		Goalie stats	Mathias Onuska (2-0) (22 saves / 23 shots)

April 26	Windsor Spitfires	2 – 5	Sarnia Sting	Progressive Auto Sales Arena	Recap
No scoring		First period	No scoring
Ethan Miedema (1) - 7:47		Second period	17:01 - pp - Ty Voit; 19:45 - pp - Max Namestnikov (1)
Ryan Abraham (1) - 2:08		Third period	4:06 - pp - Nolan DeGurse (1); 6:07 - pp - Ethan Ritchie (1); 18:30 - en - Nolan DeGurse (2)
Mathias Onuska (2-1) (18 saves / 22 shots)		Goalie stats	Benjamin Gaudreau (1-2) (31 saves / 33 shots)

April 28	Windsor Spitfires	4 – 1	Sarnia Sting	Progressive Auto Sales Arena	Recap
No scoring		First period	2:15 - Angus MacDonell (1)
Jacob Maillet (1) - 4:17; Will Cuylle (3) - 9:53; Oliver Peer (1) - 14:51		Second period	No scoring
Wyatt Johnston (1) - 6:55		Third period	No scoring
Mathias Onuska (3-1) (24 saves / 25 shots)		Goalie stats	Benjamin Gaudreau (1-3) (27 saves / 31 shots)

April 30	Sarnia Sting	3 – 2	OT	Windsor Spitfires	WFCU Centre	Recap
No scoring		First period		2:08 - pp - Andrew Perrott (2)
Nolan DeGurse (3) - pp - 13:51; Nolan DeGurse (4) - 14:33		Second period		No scoring
No scoring		Third period		6:31 - sh - Will Cuylle (4)
Ty Voit (2) - 8:21		First overtime period		No scoring
Benjamin Gaudreau (2-3) (43 saves / 45 shots)		Goalie stats		Mathias Onuska (3-2) (20 saves / 23 shots)

May 1	Windsor Spitfires	3 – 1	Sarnia Sting	Progressive Auto Sales Arena	Recap
Josh Currie (1) - 12:00; Wyatt Johnston (2) - 19:21		First period	No scoring
No scoring		Second period	No scoring
Will Cuylle (5) - en - 19:51		Third period	18:26 - pp - Nolan Dann (2)
Mathias Onuska (4-2) (25 saves / 26 shots)		Goalie stats	Benjamin Gaudreau (2-4) (29 saves / 31 shots)

Windsor wins series 4 – 2

===== (2) London Knights vs. (7) Kitchener Rangers =====
April 21	Kitchener Rangers	3 – 2	London Knights	Budweiser Gardens	Recap
Mitchell Martin (1) - 7:57		First period	No scoring
Francesco Pinelli (1) - pp - 10:50		Second period	No scoring
Francesco Pinelli (2) - 1:36		Third period	2:48 - Antonio Stranges (1); 11:14 - Antonio Stranges (2)
Pavel Cajan (1-0) (34 saves / 36 shots)		Goalie stats	Brett Brochu (0-1) (23 saves / 26 shots)

April 22	Kitchener Rangers	2 – 5	London Knights	Budweiser Gardens	Recap
No scoring		First period	16:10 - Cody Morgan (1); 17:47 - Antonio Stranges (3)
No scoring		Second period	0:21 - Gerard Keane (1)
Adrian Misaljevic (1) - 12:04; Mike Petizan (1) - 14:32		Third period	5:44 - Oliver Bonk (1); 17:27 - pp - Gerard Keane (2)
Pavel Cajan (1-1) (39 saves / 44 shots)		Goalie stats	Brett Brochu (1-1) (14 saves / 16 shots)

April 24	London Knights	4 – 3	Kitchener Rangers	Kitchener Memorial Auditorium	Recap
Tye McSorley (1) - pp - 1:13; Luke Evangelista (1) - pp - 2:43; Kirill Steklov (1) - 7:12		First period	6:16 - pp - Mike Petizan (2); 12:56 - Joseph Serpa (1)
Tye McSorley (2) - 5:13		Second period	No scoring
No scoring		Third period	7:55 - Mike Petizan (3)
Brett Brochu (2-1) (38 saves / 41 shots)		Goalie stats	Pavel Cajan (3 saves / 6 shots); Jackson Parsons (0-1) (27 saves / 28 shots)

April 26	London Knights	2 – 3	Kitchener Rangers	Kitchener Memorial Auditorium	Recap
No scoring		First period	2:56 - Antonio Pugliese (1)
Max McCue (1) - 12:55		Second period	No scoring
Cody Morgan (2) - pp - 18:05		Third period	5:10 - Francesco Pinelli (3); 8:26 - Mitchell Martin (2)
Brett Brochu (2-2) (34 saves / 37 shots)		Goalie stats	Jackson Parsons (1-1) (52 saves / 54 shots)

May 1	Kitchener Rangers	3 – 5	London Knights	Budweiser Gardens	Recap
Joseph Serpa (2) - 8:10		First period	1:33 - Max McCue (2); 5:48 - Max McCue (3); 13:43 - Antonio Stranges (4)
Mike Petizan (4) - 9:39; Mitchell Martin (3) - pp - 13:56		Second period	10:32 - Sean McGurn (1)
No scoring		Third period	18:32 - en - Max McCue (5)
Jackson Parsons (1-2) (31 saves / 35 shots)		Goalie stats	Brett Brochu (3-2) (28 saves / 31 shots)

May 3	London Knights	2 – 5	Kitchener Rangers	Kitchener Memorial Auditorium	Recap
No scoring		First period	No scoring
No scoring		Second period	2:23 - Carson Rehkopf (1); 3:12 - Trent Swick (1); 11:53 - pp - Carson Rehkopf (2); 15:40 - Reid Valade (1)
Denver Barkey (1) - 2:45; Luke Evangelista (2) - 8:53		Third period	13:13 - Adrian Misaljevic (2)
Brett Brochu (3-3) (21 saves / 25 shots); Owen Flores (3 saves / 4 shots)		Goalie stats	Pavel Cajan (2-1) (38 saves / 40 shots)

May 4	Kitchener Rangers	4 – 3	OT	London Knights	Budweiser Gardens	Recap
Mitchell Martin (4) - 11:21		First period		No scoring
Reid Valade (2) - pp - 9:02		Second period		5:28 - Camaryn Baber (1); 8:13 - pp - Gerard Keane (3)
Joseph Serpa (3) - 4:47		Third period		2:59 - Antonio Stranges (5)
Mike Petizan (5) - 11:35		First overtime period		No scoring
Pavel Cajan (3-1) (48 saves / 51 shots)		Goalie stats		Brett Brochu (3-4) (23 saves / 27 shots)

Kitchener wins series 4 – 3

===== (3) Flint Firebirds vs. (6) Owen Sound Attack =====
April 22	Owen Sound Attack	6 – 3	Flint Firebirds	Dort Financial Center	Recap
William Portokalis (1) - 2:21		First period	7:40 - pp - Brennan Othmann (1)
Colby Barlow (1) - pp - 4:34		Second period	8:15 - Amadeus Lombardi (1)
Servac Petrovsky (1) - 0:58; Nicholas Porco (1) - 16:45; Gavin Bryant (1) - sh - en - 18:24; Igor Chibrikov (1) - sh - en - 18:57		Third period	0:38 - Coulson Pitre (1)
Nick Chenard (1-0) (31 saves / 34 shots)		Goalie stats	Luke Cavallin (0-1) (24 saves / 28 shots)

April 23	Owen Sound Attack	3 – 6	Flint Firebirds	Dort Financial Center	Recap
Julian Fantino (1) - 1:47		First period	0:41 - Zacharie Giroux (1); 1:37 - Sahil Panwar (1)
No scoring		Second period	No scoring
Servac Petrovsky (2) - 15:30; Julian Fantino (2) - 17:07		Third period	10:50 - Tag Bertuzzi (1); 11:19 - Brennan Othmann (2); 11:50 - Ethan Keppen (1); 13:06 - pp - Luca D'Amato (1)
Nick Chenard (1-1) (37 saves / 42 shots); Corbin Votary (1 save / 2 shots)		Goalie stats	Luke Cavallin (1-1) (28 saves / 31 shots)

April 25	Flint Firebirds	1 – 2	Owen Sound Attack	Bayshore Community Centre	Recap
Braeden Kressler (1) - 6:14		First period	No scoring
No scoring		Second period	0:59 - pp - Cedrick Guindon (1)
No scoring		Third period	6:18 - Julian Fantino (3)
Luke Cavallin (1-2) (36 saves / 38 shots)		Goalie stats	Nick Chenard (2-1) (38 saves / 39 shots)

April 27	Flint Firebirds	3 – 2	Owen Sound Attack	Bayshore Community Centre	Recap
Amadeus Lombardi (2) - 18:17		First period	10:36 - Madden Steen (1); 15:14 - Julian Fantino (4)
No scoring		Second period	No scoring
Zacharie Giroux (2) - 2:44; Ethan Keppen (2) - 7:48		Third period	No scoring
Luke Cavallin (2-2) (28 saves / 30 shots)		Goalie stats	Nick Chenard (2-2) (41 saves / 44 shots)

May 1	Owen Sound Attack	1 – 5	Flint Firebirds	Dort Financial Center	Recap
No scoring		First period	0:16 - Coulson Pitre (2)
Colby Barlow (2) - sh - 3:20		Second period	1:08 - Brennan Othmann (3); 3:57 - Ethan Keppen (3)
No scoring		Third period	5:12 - Amadeus Lombardi (3); 6:11 - pp - Amadeau Lombardi (4)
Nick Chenard (2-3) (23 saves / 28 shots); Corbin Votary (4 saves / 4 shots)		Goalie stats	Luke Cavallin (3-2) (36 saves / 37 shots)

May 3	Flint Firebirds	0 – 4	Owen Sound Attack	Bayshore Community Centre	Recap
No scoring		First period	10:25 - Stepan Machacek (1)
No scoring		Second period	8:27 - Colby Barlow (3)
No scoring		Third period	10:03 - Ethan Burroughs (1); 17:16 - en - Ethan Burroughs (2)
Luke Cavallin (3-3) (27 saves / 30 shots)		Goalie stats	Nick Chenard (3-3) (46 saves / 46 shots)

May 4	Owen Sound Attack	2 – 4	Flint Firebirds	Dort Financial Center	Recap
Colby Barlow (4) - 5:05		First period	8:09 - sh - Sahil Panwar (2)
No scoring		Second period	13:58 - Ethan Keppen (4)
Colby Barlow (5) - 13:44		Third period	1:55 - Brennan Othmann (4); 19:02 - en - Braeden Kressler (2)
Nick Chenard (3-4) (31 saves / 34 shots)		Goalie stats	Luke Cavallin (4-3) (34 saves / 36 shots)

Flint wins series 4 – 3

===== (4) Sault Ste. Marie Greyhounds vs. (5) Guelph Storm =====
April 21	Guelph Storm	0 – 3	Sault Ste. Marie Greyhounds	GFL Memorial Gardens	Recap
No scoring		First period	No scoring
No scoring		Second period	2:15 - Tye Kartye (1); 13:19 - Tye Kartye (2); 13:58 - Ryan O'Rourke (1)
No scoring		Third period	No scoring
Owen Bennett (0-1) (21 saves / 24 shots)		Goalie stats	Tucker Tynan (1-0) (23 saves / 23 shots)

April 23	Guelph Storm	1 – 4	Sault Ste. Marie Greyhounds	GFL Memorial Gardens	Recap
Jake Karabela (1) - pp - 15:08		First period	9:45 - pp - Jack Thompson (1); 10:29 - Justin Cloutier (1); 14:36 - Tyler Savard (1)
No scoring		Second period	No scoring
No scoring		Third period	17:41 - Marco Mignosa (1)
Jacob Oster (0-1) (38 saves / 42 shots)		Goalie stats	Tucker Tynan (2-0) (30 saves / 31 shots)

April 26	Sault Ste. Marie Greyhounds	3 – 6	Guelph Storm	Sleeman Centre	Recap
Tye Kartye (3) - pp - 10:06		First period	1:46 - Ben McFarlane (1); 2:27 - Jake Karabela (2); 16:31 - Danny Zhilkin (1)
Cole MacKay (1) - 6:18		Second period	12:04 - pp - Valentin Zhugin (1)
Bryce McConnell-Barker (1) - 0:54		Third period	18:24 - en - Ben McFarlane (2); 19:54 - en - Brayden Guy (1)
Tucker Tynan (2-1) (32 saves / 36 shots)		Goalie stats	Jacob Oster (1-1) (36 saves / 39 shots)

April 28	Sault Ste. Marie Greyhounds	5 – 4	OT	Guelph Storm	Sleeman Centre	Recap
Marco Mignosa (2) - 6:36; Cole MacKay (2) - 6:52; Robert Calisti (1) - 13:33; Jack Thompson (2) - pp - 17:43		First period		No scoring
No scoring		Second period		12:22 - Charlie Paquette (1)
No scoring		Third period		3:46 - Matt Poitras (1); 4:45 - pp - Ben McFarlane (3); 19:05 - Michael Buchinger (1)
Jordan D'Intino (1) - 12:40		First overtime period		No scoring
Tucker Tynan (14 saves / 14 shots); Samuel Ivanov (1-0) (18 saves / 22 shots)		Goalie stats		Jacob Oster (17 saves / 21 shots); Owen Bennett (0-2) (25 saves / 26 shots)

April 30	Guelph Storm	0 – 6	Sault Ste. Marie Greyhounds	GFL Memorial Gardens	Recap
No scoring		First period	8:56 - Tye Kartye (4); 13:11 - Tye Kartye (5)
No scoring		Second period	5:40 - pp - Cole MacKay (3); 19:22 - Kalvyn Watson (1)
No scoring		Third period	2:04 - pp - Jack Thompson (3); 8:48 - Kalvyn Watson (2)
Jacob Oster (1-2) (28 saves / 34 shots)		Goalie stats	Samuel Ivanov (2-0) (23 saves / 23 shots)

Sault Ste. Marie wins series 4 – 1

=== Conference semifinals ===
==== Eastern conference semifinals ====
===== (1) Hamilton Bulldogs vs. (4) Mississauga Steelheads =====
May 5	Mississauga Steelheads	2 – 4	Hamilton Bulldogs	FirstOntario Centre	Recap
No scoring		First period	14:35 - Mason McTavish (6)
No scoring		Second period	16:54- Logan Morrison (7); 19:32 - Ryan Humphrey (1)
Zakary Lavoie (4) - 6:45; Aidan Prueter (1) - 19:15		Third period	9:39 - Mason McTavish (7)
Roman Basran (4-3) (29 saves / 33 shots)		Goalie stats	Marco Costantini (5-0) (30 saves / 32 shots)

May 8	Mississauga Steelheads	2 – 4	Hamilton Bulldogs	FirstOntario Centre	Recap
Aidan Prueter (2) - pp - 8:29		First period	3:52 - Ryan Humphrey (2); 17:15 - pp - Mason McTavish (8)
Luke Misa (1) - 3:42		Second period	No scoring
No scoring		Third period	0:56 - pp - Nathan Staios (2); 19:24 - en - Logan Morrison (8)
Joe Ranger (0-1) (34 saves / 37 shots)		Goalie stats	Marco Costantini (6-0) (20 saves / 22 shots)

May 10	Hamilton Bulldogs	3 – 0	Mississauga Steelheads	Paramount Fine Foods Centre	Recap
No scoring		First period	No scoring
George Diaco (2) - pp - 5:54; Ryan Winterton (2) - pp - 13:53		Second period	No scoring
Logan Morrison (9) - en - 17:54		Third period	No scoring
Marco Costantini (7-0) (35 saves / 35 shots)		Goalie stats	Joe Ranger (0-2) (29 saves / 31 shots)

May 13	Hamilton Bulldogs	3 – 2	OT	Mississauga Steelheads	Paramount Fine Foods Centre	Recap
Ryan Humphrey (3) - 1:42		First period		0:59 - Zander Veccia (1); 15:29 - pp - Aidan Prueter (3)
Mason McTavish (9) - sh - 1:03		Second period		No scoring
No scoring		Third period		No scoring
Arber Xhekaj (3) - 1:49		First overtime period		No scoring
Marco Costantini (8-0) (27 saves / 29 shots)		Goalie stats		Joe Ranger (0-3) (31 saves / 34 shots)

Hamilton wins series 4 – 0

===== (2) North Bay Battalion vs. (3) Kingston Frontenacs =====
May 6	Kingston Frontenacs	4 – 6	North Bay Battalion	North Bay Memorial Gardens	Recap
No scoring		First period	5:53 - Brandon Coe (4); 14:28 - Kyle McDonald (3)
Francesco Arcuri (3) - 15:45		Second period	0:22 - pp - Mitchell Russell (5)
Paul Ludwinski (6) - 4:37; Lucas Edmonds (4) - 6:14; Martin Chromiak (2) - 18:49		Third period	2:05 - sh - Owen Van Steensel (2); 18:15 - en - Mitchell Russell (6); 19:45 - en - Mitchell Russell (7)
Leevi Meriläinen (4-3) (34 saves / 38 shots)		Goalie stats	Joe Vrbetic (5-0) (25 saves / 29 shots)

May 8	Kingston Frontenacs	5 – 4	OT	North Bay Battalion	North Bay Memorial Gardens	Recap
Jake Murray (3) - 3:06; Matthew Soto (1) - 7:45; Martin Chromiak (3) - 8:02		First period		13:06 - Mitchell Russell (8)
No scoring		Second period		3:17 - Brandon Coe (5); 6:42 - Anthony Romani (2)
Matthew Soto (2) - 0:38		Third period		5:35 - pp - Matvey Petrov (1)
Francesco Arcuri (4) - 16:36		First overtime period		No scoring
Leevi Meriläinen (5-3) (47 saves / 51 shots)		Goalie stats		Joe Vrbetic (7 saves / 10 shots); Dom DiVincentiis (0-1) (23 saves / 25 shots)

May 10	North Bay Battalion	6 – 3	Kingston Frontenacs	Leon's Centre	Recap
Kyle Jackson (4) - 18:54		First period	5:10 - Martin Chromiak (4); 12:08 - Paul Ludwinski (7)
Kyle Jackson (5) - pp - 0:24; Kyle Jackson (6) - 15:07; Owen Outwater (1) - 15:51		Second period	11:36 - Francesco Arcuri (5)
Kyle Jackson (7) - pp - 4:08; Mitchell Russell (9) - en - 19:35		Third period	No scoring
Dom DiVincentiis (1-1) (24 saves / 27 shots)		Goalie stats	Leevi Meriläinen (5-4) (25 saves / 30 shots)

May 12	North Bay Battalion	4 – 3	Kingston Frontenacs	Leon's Centre	Recap
Kyle McDonald (4) - 15:17; Mitchell Russell (10) - pp - 17:24		First period	No scoring
Paul Christopoulos (2) - 7:39		Second period	No scoring
Mitchell Russell (11) - pp - 5:53		Third period	9:58 - Lucas Edmonds (5); 19:19 - Martin Chromiak (4); 19:54 - pp - Francesco Arcuri (6)
Dom DiVincentiis (2-1) (32 saves / 35 shots)		Goalie stats	Leevi Meriläinen (5-5) (33 saves / 37 shots)

May 14	Kingston Frontenacs	5 – 6	North Bay Battalion	North Bay Memorial Gardens	Recap
No scoring		First period	5:20 - Kyle McDonald (5); 16:53 - Kyle McDonald (6); 18:54 - Paul Christopoulos (3)
Jordan Frasca (4) - 6:30		Second period	0:55 - pp - Kyle Jackson (8); 6:17 - pp - Kyle Jackson (9)
Lucas Edmonds (6) - 0:58; Shane Wright (3) - pp - 6:02; Martin Chromiak (6) - 18:53; Martin Chromiak (7) - 19:39		Third period	9:14 - Michael Podolioukh (1)
Leevi Meriläinen (8 saves / 12 shots); Aidan Spooner (0-1) (6 saves / 8 shots)		Goalie stats	Joe Vrbetic (6-0) (30 saves / 35 shots)

North Bay wins series 4 – 1

==== Western conference semifinals ====
===== (1) Windsor Spitfires vs. (7) Kitchener Rangers =====
May 7	Kitchener Rangers	5 – 6	Windsor Spitfires	WFCU Centre	Recap
Joseph Serpa (4) - 15:43		First period	No scoring
Joseph Serpa (5) - 15:12		Second period	7:50 - Wyatt Johnston (3); 10:23 - Alex Christopoulos (2); 11:53 - Louka Henault (1)
Mitchell Martin (5) - pp - 2:35; Mitchell Martin (6) - 10:18; Mike Petizan (6) - 19:17		Third period	5:43 - Alex Christopoulos (3); 8:34 - Will Cuylle (6); 11:03 - Andrew Perrott (3)
Pavel Cajan (3-2) (33 saves / 39 shots)		Goalie stats	Mathias Onuska (5-2) (27 saves / 32 shots)

May 8	Kitchener Rangers	4 – 2	Windsor Spitfires	WFCU Centre	Recap
Trent Swick (2) - 6:46; Reid Valade (3) - sh - 18:26		First period	19:55 - Andrew Perrott (4)
No scoring		Second period	7:51 - Wyatt Johnston (4)
Jack Harper (1) - 10:31; Joseph Serpa (6) - en - 19:43		Third period	No scoring
Jackson Parsons (2-2) (37 saves / 39 shots)		Goalie stats	Mathias Onuska (5-3) (27 saves / 30 shots)

May 10	Windsor Spitfires	6 – 2	Kitchener Rangers	Kitchener Memorial Auditorium	Recap
Wyatt Johnston (5) - sh - 10:27; Daniel D'Amico (2) - pp - 16:13		First period	1:28 - pp - Mike Petizan (7)
Will Cuylle (6) - 2:06; Louka Henault (2) - 5:40; Wyatt Johnston (6) - 9:40; Matthew Maggio (1) - pp - 12:24		Second period	14:58 - pp - Simon Motew (1)
No scoring		Third period	No scoring
Mathias Onuska (6-3) (27 saves / 29 shots)		Goalie stats	Jackson Parsons (2-3) (20 saves / 24 shots); Pavel Cajan (21 saves / 23 shots)

May 12	Windsor Spitfires	6 – 3	Kitchener Rangers	Kitchener Memorial Auditorium	Recap
No scoring		First period	14:49 - Mitchell Martin (7); 18:52 - Carson Rehkopf (3)
Michael Renwick (1) - pp - 1:15; Josh Currie (2) - 6:29; Alex Christopoulos (5) - 12:17; Wyatt Johnston (7) - 14:57		Second period	No scoring
Alex Christopoulos (6) - 13:03; Wyatt Johnston (8) - en - 18:01		Third period	7:44 - Carson Rehkopf (4)
Mathias Onuska (7-3) (21 saves / 24 shots)		Goalie stats	Pavel Cajan (3-3) (38 saves / 43 shots)

May 14	Kitchener Rangers	2 – 3	Windsor Spitfires	WFCU Centre	Recap
Matthew Sop (1) - 5:13; Ty Hollett (1) - 16:41		First period	No scoring
No scoring		Second period	11:41 - Louka Henault (3); 19:14 - Michael Renwick (2)
No scoring		Third period	9:50 - pp - Andrew Perrott (5)
Pavel Cajan (3-4) (40 saves / 43 shots)		Goalie stats	Mathias Onuska (8-3) (30 saves / 32 shots)

Windsor wins series 4 – 1

===== (3) Flint Firebirds vs. (4) Sault Ste. Marie Greyhounds =====
May 6	Sault Ste. Marie Greyhounds	3 – 5	Flint Firebirds	Dort Financial Center	Recap
No scoring		First period	5:58 - pp - Ethan Keppen (5); 19:34 - pp - Brennan Othmann (5)
No scoring		Second period	No scoring
Kalvyn Watson (3) - 5:04; Jack Thompson (4) - 6:24; Jack Thompson (5) - 15:46		Third period	7:16 - Riley Piercey (1); 13:50 - Coulson Pitre (3); 19:40 - en - Coulson Pitre (4)
Samuel Ivanov (2-1) (26 saves / 30 shots)		Goalie stats	Luke Cavallin (5-3) (55 saves / 58 shots)

May 8	Sault Ste. Marie Greyhounds	3 – 5	Flint Firebirds	Dort Financial Center	Recap
Tye Kartye (6) - pp - 1:13		First period	10:43 - Gavin Hayes (1); 19:18 - Brennan Othmann (6)
Cole MacKay (4) - pp - 7:53; Tyler Savard (2) - 8:58		Second period	2:41 - Coulson Pitre (5)
No scoring		Third period	5:22 - Brennan Othmann (7); 14:28 - Tag Bertuzzi (2)
Samuel Ivanov (2-2) (30 saves / 35 shots)		Goalie stats	Luke Cavallin (6-3) (53 saves / 56 shots)

May 10	Flint Firebirds	2 – 3	Sault Ste. Marie Greyhounds	GFL Memorial Gardens	Recap
No scoring		First period	4:57 Jordan D'Intino (2); 10:10 - Rory Kerins (1); 12:26 - Tyler Savard (3)
Gavin Hayes (2) - pp - 16:39		Second period	No scoring
Gavin Hayes (3) - 12:09		Third period	No scoring
Luke Cavallin (6-4) (26 saves / 29 shots)		Goalie stats	Tucker Tynan (3-1) (29 saves / 31 shots)

May 12	Flint Firebirds	3 – 2	OT	Sault Ste. Marie Greyhounds	GFL Memorial Gardens	Recap
Braeden Kressler (3) - 16:17; Sahil Panwar (3) - 18:59		First period		5:11 - Jack Thompson (6); 8:30 - pp - Tye Kartye (7)
No scoring		Second period		No scoring
No scoring		Third period		No scoring
Brennan Othmann (8) - 8:37		First overtime period		No scoring
Luke Cavallin (7-4) (39 saves / 41 shots)		Goalie stats		Tucker Tynan (3-2) (33 saves / 36 shots)

May 14	Sault Ste. Marie Greyhounds	1 – 7	Flint Firebirds	Dort Financial Center	Recap
No scoring		First period	No scoring
No scoring		Second period	2:14 - Tyler Deline (1); 11:21 - pp - Gavin Hayes (4); 13:46 - pp - Zacharie Giroux (3); 15:24 - pp - Zacharie Giroux (4)
Cole MacKay (5) - 19:35		Third period	2:19 - Coulson Pitre (6); 11:05 - Simon Slavicek (1); 18:04 - pp - Zacharie Giroux (5)
Tucker Tynan (3-3) (48 saves / 55 shots)		Goalie stats	Luke Cavallin (8-4) (27 saves / 28 shots)

Flint wins series 4 – 1

=== Conference finals ===
==== Eastern Conference finals ====
===== (1) Hamilton Bulldogs vs. (2) North Bay Battalion =====
May 20	North Bay Battalion	2 – 5	Hamilton Bulldogs	FirstOntario Centre	Recap
Brandon Coe (6) - pp - 17:50		First period	1:15 - Ryan Humphrey (4); 19:12 - pp - Ryan Winterton (3)
Dalyn Wakely (1) - 15:51		Second period	6:54 - Logan Morrison (10); 10:03 - Avery Hayes (3)
No scoring		Third period	10:13 - Arber Xhekaj (4)
Joe Vrbetic (6-1) (25 saves / 30 shots)		Goalie stats	Marco Costantini (9-0) (20 saves / 22 shots)

May 22	North Bay Battalion	0 – 5	Hamilton Bulldogs	FirstOntario Centre	Recap
No scoring		First period	4:27 - pp - Logan Morrison (11); 19:47 - Mason McTavish (10)
No scoring		Second period	1:59 - sh - Avery Hayes (4); 6:48 - pp - Avery Hayes (5)
No scoring		Third period	9:16 - pp - Ryan Winterton (4)
Dom DiVincentiis (2-2) (36 saves / 41 shots)		Goalie stats	Marco Costantini (10-0) (28 saves / 28 shots)

May 25	Hamilton Bulldogs	6 – 4	North Bay Battalion	North Bay Memorial Gardens	Recap
Avery Hayes (6) - sh - 8:14; Avery Hayes (7) - 13:48		First period	2:42 - Matvey Petrov (2)
Mark Duarte (1) - 0:34; Logan Morrison (12) - 11:25		Second period	4:08 - Anthony Romani (3); 8:05 - Nic Sima (1)
Ryan Winterton (5) - 2:34; Logan Morrison (13) - en - 19:28		Third period	14:24 - pp - Brandon Coe (7)
Marco Costantini (11-0) (27 saves / 31 shots)		Goalie stats	Dom DiVincentiis (2-3) (23 saves/ 28 shots)

May 27	Hamilton Bulldogs	6 – 0	North Bay Battalion	North Bay Memorial Gardens	Recap
Jan Myšák (1) - 2:53; Arber Xhekaj (5) - pp - 7:40		First period	No scoring
Jan Myšák (2) - 1:41; Avery Hayes (8) - 11:40		Second period	No scoring
Jan Myšák (3) - 17:17; George Diaco (3) - 19:35		Third period	No scoring
Marco Costantini (12-0) (18 saves / 18 shots)		Goalie stats	Dom DiVincentiis (2-4) (26 saves / 32 shots)

Hamilton wins series 4 – 0

==== Western Conference finals ====
===== (1) Windsor Spitfires vs. (3) Flint Firebirds =====
May 21	Flint Firebirds	4 – 3	Windsor Spitfires	WFCU Centre	Recap
Amadeus Lombardi (5) - 12:48		First period	18:52 - pp - Ryan Abraham (2)
Tag Bertuzzi (3) - 3:50; James Mayotte (1) - 9:08; Tag Bertuzzi (4) - 15:41		Second period	0:25 - pp - Wyatt Johnston (9); 19:11 - Ryan Abraham (3)
No scoring		Third period	No scoring
Luke Cavallin (9-4) (35 saves / 38 shots)		Goalie stats	Mathias Onuska (8-4) (27 saves / 31 shots)

May 23	Flint Firebirds	2 – 7	Windsor Spitfires	WFCU Centre	Recap
No scoring		First period	16:25 - sh - Will Cuylle (7)
Amadeus Lombardi (6) - 19:18		Second period	4:07 - pp - Matthew Maggio (2); 17:18 - Matthew Maggio (3); 19:48 - Will Cuylle (8)
Riley Piercey (2) - 18:23		Third period	8:49 - Jacob Maillet (2); 13:20 - Oliver Peer (2); 17:54 - Matthew Maggio (4)
Luke Cavallin (9-5) (33 saves / 38 shots); Nathaniel Day (5 saves / 7 shots)		Goalie stats	Mathias Onuska (9-4) (37 saves / 39 shots)

May 25	Windsor Spitfires	3 – 6	Flint Firebirds	Dort Financial Center	Recap
Daniel D'Amico (3) - 6:30; Oliver Peer (3) - 9:06; Michael Renwick (3) - 15:45		First period	17:51 - sh - Ethan Hay (1)
No scoring		Second period	5:27 - Braeden Kressler (4); 13:21 - pp - Ethan Keppen (6); 17:20 - Braeden Kressler (5)
No scoring		Third period	19:19 - en Sahil Panwar (4); 19:55 - en - Tyler Deline (7)
Mathias Onuska (9-5) (39 saves / 43 shots)		Goalie stats	Luke Cavallin (10-5) (37 saves / 40 shots)

May 27	Windsor Spitfires	4 – 2	Flint Firebirds	Dort Financial Center	Recap
Wyatt Johnston (10) - 0:21; Will Cuylle (9) - 13:13; Daniel D'Amico (4) - 19:50		First period	No scoring
No scoring		Second period	1:31 - pp - Gavin Hayes (5); 8:43 - pp - Braeden Kressler (6)
Matthew Maggio (5) - en - 19:44		Third period	No scoring
Mathias Onuska (10-5) (28 saves / 30 shots)		Goalie stats	Luke Cavallin (10-6) (34 saves / 37 shots)

May 29	Flint Firebirds	4 – 3	Windsor Spitfires	WFCU Centre	Recap
Brennan Othmann (9) - sh - 18:37; Zacharie Giroux (6) - 19:57		First period	11:14 - Wyatt Johnston (11); 16:23 - Alex Christopoulos (7)
Amadeus Lombardi (7) - 3:04; Tag Bertuzzi (5) - 7:43		Second period	16:19 - pp - Will Cuylle (10)
No scoring		Third period	No scoring
Luke Cavallin (11-6) (42 saves / 45 shots)		Goalie stats	Mathias Onuska (5 saves / 8 shots); Xavier Medina (0-1) (10 saves / 11 shots)

May 31	Windsor Spitfires	3 – 2	OT	Flint Firebirds	Dort Financial Center	Recap
Daniel D'Amico (5) - 3:56		First period		3:44 - pp - Ethan Keppen (7)
No scoring		Second period		11:06 - pp - Riley Piercey (3)
Daniel D'Amico (6) - 9:22		Third period		No scoring
Andrew Perrott (6) - 18:42		First overtime period		No scoring
Xavier Medina (1-1) (31 saves / 33 shots)		Goalie stats		Luke Cavallin (11-7) (54 saves / 57 shots)

June 1	Flint Firebirds	0 – 4	Windsor Spitfires	WFCU Centre	Recap
No scoring		First period	7:46 - Daniel D'Amico (7); 13:30 - Daniel D'Amico (8)
No scoring		Second period	16:10 - Alex Christopoulos (8)
No scoring		Third period	17:06 - en - Daniel D'Amico (9)
Luke Cavallin (11-8) (32 saves / 35 shots)		Goalie stats	Xavier Medina (2-1) (38 saves / 38 shots)

Windsor wins series 4 – 3

=== J. Ross Robertson Cup finals ===
Game 7 set a league record-breaking attendance of 11,779 at the FirstOntario Centre.

==== (E1) Hamilton Bulldogs vs. (W1) Windsor Spitfires ====
June 3	Windsor Spitfires	4 – 3	OT	Hamilton Bulldogs	FirstOntario Centre	Recap
No scoring		First period		No scoring
Will Cuylle (11) - 12:39		Second period		11:50 - pp - Avery Hayes (9); 18:26 - Colton Kammerer (1)
Will Cuylle (12) - pp - 12:30; Oliver Peer (4) - 17:13		Third period		10:11 - Mark Duarte (2)
Michael Renwick (4) - pp - 9:30		First overtime period		No scoring
Xavier Medina (3-1) (43 saves / 46 shots)		Goalie stats		Marco Costantini (12-1) (31 saves / 35 shots)

June 5	Windsor Spitfires	4 – 5	Hamilton Bulldogs	FirstOntario Centre	Recap
Louka Henault (4) - pp - 4:54		First period	12:31 - pp - Mason McTavish (11); 14:21 - Avery Hayes (10); 15:51 - Lawson Sherk (2)
Matthew Maggio (6) - pp - 16:26		Second period	9:59 - pp - Avery Hayes (11); 19:41 - Arber Xhekaj (6)
Andrew Perrott (7) - 15:05; Matthew Maggio (7) - 15:41		Third period	No scoring
Xavier Medina (3-2) (22 saves / 26 shots); Mathias Onuska (1 save / 2 shots)		Goalie stats	Marco Costantini (13-1) (21 saves / 25 shots)

June 6	Hamilton Bulldogs	3 – 6	Windsor Spitfires	WFCU Centre	Recap
Logan Morrison (14) - 10:31; Ryan Winterton (6) - 19:33		First period	16:58 - Alex Christopoulos (9); 19:07 - Wyatt Johnston (12)
No scoring		Second period	2:24 - Wyatt Johnston (13); 13:46 - Jacob Maillet (3)
Mason McTavish (12) - pp - 10:57		Third period	3:21 - Alex Chrisopoulos (10); 19:36 - en - sh - Will Cuylle (13)
Marco Costantini (13-2) (26 saves / 31 shots)		Goalie stats	Mathias Onuska (11-5) (35 saves / 38 shots)

June 10	Hamilton Bulldogs	3 – 2	OT	Windsor Spitfires	WFCU Centre	Recap
Logan Morrison (15) - 2:20		First period		No scoring
No scoring		Second period		5:29 - Josh Currie (3); 12:41 - Will Cuylle (14)
Nathan Staios (3) - 18:03		Third period		No scoring
Gavin White (2) - 7:35		First overtime period		No scoring
Marco Costantini (14-2) (20 saves / 22 shots)		Goalie stats		Mathias Onuska (11-6) (41 saves / 44 shots)

June 12	Windsor Spitfires	2 – 3	Hamilton Bulldogs	FirstOntario Centre	Recap
Wyatt Johnston (14) - 8:42		First period	14:12 - pp - Ryan Winterton (7)
Ryan Abraham (4) - 3:13		Second period	12:58 - pp - Mason McTavish (13)
No scoring		Third period	1:59 - Mason McTavish (14)
Mathias Onuska (11-7) (21 saves / 24 shots)		Goalie stats	Marco Costantini (15-2) (24 saves / 26 shots)

June 13	Hamilton Bulldogs	2 – 5	Windsor Spitfires	WFCU Centre	Recap
Logan Morrison (16) - 15:54		First period	7:27 - sh - Daniel D'Amico (10)
Logan Morrison (17) - 10:46		Second period	18:44 - Daniel D'Amico (11); 19:31 - Michael Renwick (5)
No scoring		Third period	0:46 - pp - Will Cuylle (15); 16:58 - Pasquale Zito (2)
Marco Costantini (15-3) (21 saves / 26 shots)		Goalie stats	Mathias Onuska (12-7) (27 saves / 29 shots)

June 15	Windsor Spitfires	1 – 6	Hamilton Bulldogs	FirstOntario Centre	Recap
No scoring		First period	2:04 - Mason McTavish (15)
No scoring		Second period	12:57 - Avery Hayes (12)
Alex Christopoulos (11) - 13:38		Third period	6:18 - Avery Hayes (13); 13:01 - Jan Myšák (4); 15:26 - en - Mason McTavish (16); 17:11 - en - Avery Hayes (14)
Mathias Onuska (12-8)		Goalie stats	Marco Costantini (16-3)

Hamilton wins series 4 – 3

=== J. Ross Robertson Cup Champions Roster ===
2021-22 Hamilton Bulldogs
Goaltenders: (Canada) 33 – Marco Constantini; (Canada) 45 – Matteo Drobac	Defencemen: (Russia) 2 – Artem Grushnikov; (Canada) 3 – Noah Van Vliet; (Canada) 4 – Lucas Moore; (Canada) 7 – Noah Roberts; (Canada) 8 – Arber Xhekaj; (Canada) 10 – Gavin White; (Canada) 21 – Colton Kammerer – C; (Canada) 44 – Nathan Staios – A; (Canada) 75 – Jorian Donovan	Wingers: (United States) 13 – Avery Hayes; (Canada) 14 – George Diaco; (United States) 22 – Ryan Humphrey; (Canada) 25 – Brenden Anderson; (Canada) 27 – Ryan Winterton; (Canada) 88 – Mark Duarte; (Canada) 92 – Cole Brown	Centres: (Canada) 6 – Noah Nelson; (Canada) 9 – Logan Morrison – A; (Canada) 17 – Giordano Biondi; (Czech Republic) 19 – Jan Myšák – A; (Canada) 20 – Ethan Sims; (Canada) 23 – Mason McTavish; (Canada) 39 – Lawson Sherk; (Canada) 81 – Braeden O'Keefe; (Canada) 93 – Patrick Thomas; Coach: (Canada) Jay McKee; General Manager: (Canada) Steve Staios

=== Playoff scoring leaders ===
Note: GP = Games played; G = Goals; A = Assists; Pts = Points; PIM = Penalty minutes

Player	Team	GP	G	A	Pts	PIM
Wyatt Johnston	Windsor Spitfires	25	14	27	41	12
Logan Morrison	Hamilton Bulldogs	19	17	22	39	2
Avery Hayes	Hamilton Bulldogs	16	14	20	34	19
Will Cuylle	Windsor Spitfires	25	15	16	31	30
Mason McTavish	Hamilton Bulldogs	19	16	13	29	26
Brennan Othmann	Flint Firebirds	19	9	15	24	18
Mitchell Russell	North Bay Battalion	11	11	11	22	6
Daniel D'Amico	Windsor Spitfires	25	11	10	21	25
Brandon Coe	North Bay Battalion	12	7	13	20	8
Ryan Winterton	Hamilton Bulldogs	18	7	12	19	6
Francesco Arcuri	Kingston Frontenacs	11	6	13	19	8

=== Playoff leading goaltenders ===
Note: GP = Games played; Mins = Minutes played; W = Wins; L = Losses: OTL = Overtime losses;
SL = Shootout losses; GA = Goals Allowed; SO = Shutouts; GAA = Goals against average

Player	Team	GP	MINS	W	L	GA	SO	Sv%	GAA
Xavier Medina	Windsor Spitfires	5	296	3	2	10	1	0.935	2.03
Roman Basran	Mississauga Steelheads	7	475	4	3	17	0	0.915	2.15
Marco Costantini	Hamilton Bulldogs	19	1153	16	3	44	3	0.913	2.29
Mack Guzda	Barrie Colts	4	263	1	3	11	0	0.929	2.51
Tucker Tynan	Sault Ste. Marie Greyhounds	7	397	3	3	17	1	0.925	2.57

== Awards ==
Playoffs trophies
Trophy name	Recognition	Recipient
J. Ross Robertson Cup	OHL Finals champion	Hamilton Bulldogs
Bobby Orr Trophy	Eastern Conference playoff champion	Hamilton Bulldogs
Wayne Gretzky Trophy	Western Conference playoff champion	Windsor Spitfires
Wayne Gretzky 99 Award	Playoffs MVP	Logan Morrison, Hamilton Bulldogs
Regular season — Team trophies
Trophy name	Recognition	Recipient
Hamilton Spectator Trophy	Team with best record	Hamilton Bulldogs
Leyden Trophy	East division champion	Hamilton Bulldogs
Emms Trophy	Central division champion	North Bay Battalion
Bumbacco Trophy	West division champion	Windsor Spitfires
Holody Trophy	Midwest division champion	London Knights
Regular season — Executive awards
Trophy name	Recognition	Recipient
Matt Leyden Trophy	Coach of the year	James Richmond, Mississauga Steelheads
Jim Gregory Award	General manager of the year	Steve Staios, Hamilton Bulldogs
Bill Long Award	Lifetime achievement	–
OHL Executive of the Year	Executive of the Year	–
Regular season — Player awards
Trophy name	Recognition	Recipient
Red Tilson Trophy	Most outstanding player	Wyatt Johnston, Windsor Spitfires
Eddie Powers Memorial Trophy	Top scorer	Wyatt Johnston, Windsor Spitfires
Dave Pinkney Trophy	Lowest team goals against	Marco Costantini & Matteo Drobac, Hamilton Bulldogs
Max Kaminsky Trophy	Most outstanding defenceman	Nathan Staios, Hamilton Bulldogs
Jim Mahon Memorial Trophy	Top scoring right winger	Lucas Edmonds, Kingston Frontenacs
Emms Family Award	Rookie of the year	Cam Allen, Guelph Storm
William Hanley Trophy	Most sportsmanlike player	Wyatt Johnston, Windsor Spitfires
F. W. "Dinty" Moore Trophy	Best rookie GAA	Dom DiVincentiis, North Bay Battalion
Bobby Smith Trophy	Scholastic player of the year	Owen Beck, Mississauga Steelheads
Leo Lalonde Memorial Trophy	Overage player of the year	Brandon Coe, North Bay Battalion
Jim Rutherford Trophy	Goaltender of the year	Brett Brochu, London Knights
Dan Snyder Memorial Trophy	Humanitarian of the year	Mark Woolley, Owen Sound Attack
Roger Neilson Memorial Award	Top academic college/university player	Adam Varga, Ottawa 67's
Ivan Tennant Memorial Award	Top academic high school player	Cal Uens, Owen Sound Attack
Mickey Renaud Captain's Trophy	Team captain that best exemplifies character and commitment	Mark Woolley, Owen Sound Attack
Prospect player awards
Trophy name	Recognition	Recipient
Jack Ferguson Award	First overall pick in priority selection	Michael Misa, Saginaw Spirit
Tim Adams Memorial Trophy	OHL Cup MVP	Michael Misa, Mississauga Senators

== All-Star teams ==
The OHL All-Star Teams were selected by the OHL's General Managers.

=== First team ===
- Wyatt Johnston, Centre, Windsor Spitfires
- Brennan Othmann, Left Wing, Flint Firebirds
- Brandon Coe, Right Wing, North Bay Battalion
- Nathan Staios, Defence, Hamilton Bulldogs
- Ryan O'Rourke, Defence, Sault Ste. Marie Greyhounds
- Brett Brochu, Goaltender, London Knights
- James Richmond, Coach, Mississauga Steelheads

=== Second team ===
- Mason McTavish, Centre, Peterborough Petes/Hamilton Bulldogs
- Will Cuylle, Left Wing, Windsor Spitfires
- Luke Evangelista, Right Wing, London Knights
- Jack Thompson, Defence, Sudbury Wolves/Sault Ste. Marie Greyhounds
- Brandt Clarke, Defence, Barrie Colts
- Luke Cavallin, Goaltender, Flint Firebirds
- Ted Dent, Coach, Flint Firebirds

=== Third team ===
- Shane Wright, Centre, Kingston Frontenacs
- Tye Kartye, Left Wing, Sault Ste. Marie Greyhounds
- Lucas Edmonds, Right Wing, Kingston Frontenacs
- Arber Xhekaj, Defence, Kitchener Rangers/Hamilton Bulldogs
- Pavel Mintyukov, Defence, Saginaw Spirit
- Marco Costantini, Goaltender, Hamilton Bulldogs
- Jay McKee, Coach, Hamilton Bulldogs

=== First All-Rookie team ===
- Calum Ritchie, Centre, Oshawa Generals
- Colby Barlow, Left Wing, Owen Sound Attack
- Coulson Pitre, Right Wing, Flint Firebirds
- Cam Allen, Defence, Guelph Storm
- Michael Buchinger, Defence, Guelph Storm
- Nolan Lalonde, Goaltender, Erie Otters

=== Second All-Rookie team ===
- Owen Beck, Centre, Mississauga Steelheads
- Quentin Musty, Left Wing, Sudbury Wolves
- Vinzenz Rohrer, Right Wing, Ottawa 67's
- Ty Nelson, Defence, North Bay Battalion
- Beau Akey, Defence, Barrie Colts
- Dom DiVincentiis, Goaltender, North Bay Battalion

== 2022 OHL Priority Selection ==
On April 20, 2022, the league announced the results of their first-ever Ontario Hockey League Priority Selection Draft Lottery. The Saginaw Spirit won the lottery and selected Michael Misa from the Mississauga Senators of the GTHL. The entirety of the OHL Priority Selection Draft will take place over two days, as rounds 1-3 take place on April 29, while rounds 4-15 will be on April 30.

These are the results for the first round of the draft:

#	Player	Nationality	OHL team	Hometown	Minor team
1	Michael Misa (C)	Canada	Saginaw Spirit	Oakville, Ontario	Mississauga Senators (GTHL)
2	Malcolm Spence (LW)	Canada	Erie Otters	Mississauga, Ontario	Mississauga Senators (GTHL)
3	Nathan Villeneuve (C)	Canada	Sudbury Wolves	Orleans, Ontario	Navan Grads (HEO Midget)
4	Sam Dickinson (LD)	Canada	Niagara IceDogs	Toronto, Ontario	Toronto Marlboros (GTHL)
5	Porter Martone (RW)	Canada	Sarnia Sting	Peterborough, Ontario	Toronto Jr. Canadiens (GTHL)
6	Jack Van Volsen (C)	Canada	Peterborough Petes	Whitby, Ontario	Toronto Jr. Canadiens (GTHL)
7	Henry Mews (RD)	Canada	Ottawa 67's	Ottawa, Ontario	Toronto Jr. Canadiens (GTHL)
8	Beckett Sennecke (LW)	Canada	Oshawa Generals	London, Ontario	Toronto Marlboros (GTHL)
9	Michael Hage (C)	Canada	Kitchener Rangers	Mississauga, Ontario	Toronto Jr. Canadiens (GTHL)
10	Cole Beaudoin (C)	Canada	Barrie Colts	Kanata, Ontario	Nepean Raiders (HEO Midget)
11	Ben Cormier (C)	Canada	Owen Sound Attack	Ottawa, Ontario	Navan Grads (HEO Midget)
12	Jett Luchanko (RW)	Canada	Guelph Storm	London, Ontario	London Jr. Knights (MHAO-ALI)
13	Lucas Karmiris (C)	Canada	Mississauga Steelheads	Brantford, Ontario	Brantford 99ers (MHAO-ALI)
14	Ben Danford (LD)	Canada	Oshawa Generals	Madoc, Ontario	Quinte Red Devils (OMHA-ETA)
15	Luca Testa (C)	Canada	London Knights	Grimsby, Ontario	Niagara North Stars (GOJHL)
16	Christopher Brown (C)	Canada	Sault Ste. Marie Greyhounds	Toronto, Ontario	North York Rangers (GTHL)
17	Gabriel Frasca (C)	Canada	Kingston Frontenacs	Caledon, Ontario	Mississauga Senators (GTHL)
18	Kaden Pitre (C)	Canada	Flint Firebirds	Stouffville, Ontario	Vaughan Kings (GTHL)
19	Zayne Parekh (RD)	Canada	Saginaw Spirit	Nobleton, Ontario	Markham Majors (GTHL)
20	Ethan Procyszyn (RW)	Canada	North Bay Battalion	Wasaga Beach, Ontario	North Central Predators (OMHA-ETA)
21	Frank Marrelli (LD)	Canada	Ottawa 67's	Markham, Ontario	Markham Waxers (OMHA-ETA)
22	Anthony Cristoforo (RD)	Canada	Windsor Spitfires	Vaughan, Ontario	Toronto Jr. Canadiens (GTHL)
23	Marek Vanacker (LW)	Canada	Hamilton Bulldogs	Delhi, Ontario	Brantford 99ers (MHAO-ALI)

== 2022 CHL Import Draft ==
On July 1, 2022, the Canadian Hockey League conducted the 2022 CHL Import Draft, in which teams in all three CHL leagues participate in. The Saginaw Spirit held the first pick in the draft by a team in the OHL. The Spirit selected Martin Misiak from Slovakia with the OHL's first selection in the draft.

Below are the players who were selected in the first round by Ontario Hockey League teams in the 2022 CHL Import Draft.

#	Player	Nationality	OHL team	Hometown	Last team
2	Martin Misiak (C)	Slovakia	Saginaw Spirit	Banská Bystrica, Slovakia	Nove Zamky
5	Ondrej Molnar (LW)	Slovakia	Erie Otters	Nitra, Slovakia	Nitra HK
8	Jakub Chromiak (RD)	Slovakia	Sudbury Wolves	Ilava, Slovakia	Trencin Dukla HK
11	No selection made		Niagara IceDogs		
14	Sandis Vilmanis (LW)	Latvia	Sarnia Sting	Riga, Latvia	Lulea HC Jr.
17	Tommy Purdeller (LW)	Italy	Peterborough Petes	Brunico, Italy	EC Red Bull Akademie U19
20	Marco Kasper (C)	Austria	Ottawa 67's	Innsbruck, Austria	Rogle BK Jr.
23	Kimo Gruber (C)	Switzerland	Oshawa Generals	Bülach, Switzerland	Kloten Jr.
26	Tomas Hamara (LD)	Czech Republic	Kitchener Rangers	Prague, Czech Republic	Tappara Tampere U20
29	Eduard Sale (LW)	Czech Republic	Barrie Colts	Brno, Czech Republic	Brno Kometa Jr.
32	Luc Schweingruber (LD)	Switzerland	Owen Sound Attack	Bern, Switzerland	Bern Jr.
35	Niko Minkkinen (RD)	Finland	Guelph Storm	Jyväskylä, Finland	JYP Jyväskylä U20
38	Alessio Beglieri (G)	Switzerland	Mississauga Steelheads	Biel, Switzerland	Biel-Bienne Jr.
41	Kasper Halttunen (RW)	Finland	London Knights	Helsinki, Finland	Jokerit Helsinki U20
44	Noel Nordh (RW)	Sweden	Sault Ste. Marie Greyhounds	Söderhamn, Sweden	Brynas IF J18E
47	Ivan Zhigalov (G)	Belarus	Kingston Frontenacs	Minsk, Belarus	Sherbrooke Phoenix
50	Nikita Zozulia (LW)	Ukraine	Flint Firebirds	Kyiv, Ukraine	Anaheim Jr. Ice Dogs 16U
53	No selection made		North Bay Battalion		
56	Tomas Hebek (LD)	Czech Republic	Windsor Spitfires	Pardubice, Czech Republic	Dynamo Pardubice Jr.
58	Alex Sotek (LW)	Slovakia	Hamilton Bulldogs	Poprad, Slovakia	Slovan Bratislava

== 2022 NHL entry draft ==
On July 7–8, 2022, the National Hockey League conducted the 2022 NHL entry draft at the Bell Centre in Montreal, Quebec. Shane Wright of the Kingston Frontenacs was the highest player from the OHL to be selected, as he was taken with the fourth overall pick by the Seattle Kraken. A total of 35 players were drafted from the OHL.

Below are the players selected from OHL teams at the NHL Entry Draft.

Round	#	Player	Nationality	NHL team	Hometown	OHL team
1	4	Shane Wright (C)	Canada	Seattle Kraken	Burlington, Ontario	Kingston Frontenacs
1	10	Pavel Mintyukov (D)	Russia	Anaheim Ducks	Moscow, Russia	Saginaw Spirit
2	33	Owen Beck (C)	Canada	Montreal Canadiens	Port Hope, Ontario	Mississauga Steelheads
2	39	Paul Ludwinski (C)	Canada	Chicago Blackhawks	Pickering, Ontario	Kingston Frontenacs
2	44	Luca Del Bel Belluz (C)	Canada	Columbus Blue Jackets	Woodbridge, Ontario	Mississauga Steelheads
2	47	Hunter Haight (C)	Canada	Minnesota Wild	Strathroy, Ontario	Barrie Colts
2	48	Matyas Sapovaliv (C)	Czech Republic	Vegas Golden Knights	Kladno, Czech Republic	Saginaw Spirit
2	50	Christian Kyrou (D)	Canada	Dallas Stars	Komoka, Ontario	Erie Otters
2	54	Matt Poitras (C)	Canada	Boston Bruins	Brooklin, Ontario	Guelph Storm
2	61	David Goyette (C)	Canada	Seattle Kraken	Hawkesbury, Ontario	Sudbury Wolves
3	66	Gavin Hayes (RW)	United States	Chicago Blackhawks	Westland, Michigan	Flint Firebirds
3	68	Ty Nelson (D)	Canada	Seattle Kraken	Toronto, Ontario	North Bay Battalion
3	75	Vinzenz Rohrer (RW)	Austria	Montreal Canadiens	Feldkirch, Austria	Ottawa 67's
3	77	Danny Zhilkin (C)	Canada	Winnipeg Jets	Mississauga, Ontario	Guelph Storm
3	86	Lucas Edmonds (RW)	Canada	Tampa Bay Lightning	North Bay, Ontario	Kingston Frontenacs
3	88	Michael Buchinger (D)	Canada	St. Louis Blues	Markham, Ontario	Guelph Storm
3	97	Bryce McConnell-Barker (C)	Canada	New York Rangers	London, Ontario	Sault Ste. Marie Greyhounds
4	98	Isaiah George (D)	Canada	New York Islanders	Oakville, Ontario	London Knights
4	113	Amadeus Lombardi (C)	Canada	Detroit Red Wings	Aurora, Ontario	Flint Firebirds
4	115	Gavin White (D)	Canada	Dallas Stars	Brockville, Ontario	Hamilton Bulldogs
4	123	Tucker Robertson (C)	Canada	Seattle Kraken	Toronto, Ontario	Peterborough Petes
4	127	Cedrick Guindon (C)	Canada	Montreal Canadiens	Rockland, Ontario	Owen Sound Attack
5	136	Jorian Donovan (D)	Canada	Ottawa Senators	Richmond, Ontario	Hamilton Bulldogs
5	137	Tnias Mathurin (D)	Canada	Detroit Red Wings	Ajax, Ontario	North Bay Battalion
5	142	Matthew Maggio (RW)	Canada	New York Islanders	Tecumseh, Ontario	Windsor Spitfires
5	149	Jake Karabela (LW)	Canada	Washington Capitals	Guelph, Ontario	Guelph Storm
6	167	Nolan Collins (D)	Canada	Pittsburgh Penguins	Whitby, Ontario	Sudbury Wolves
6	184	Landon Sim (LW)	Canada	St. Louis Blues	New Glasgow, Nova Scotia	London Knights
6	185	Servac Petrovsky (C)	Slovakia	Minnesota Wild	Veľký Šariš, Slovakia	Owen Sound Attack
7	196	Kyle Jackson (C)	Canada	Seattle Kraken	Ottawa, Ontario	North Bay Battalion
7	200	Jackson Edward (D)	Canada	Boston Bruins	Newmarket, Ontario	London Knights
7	207	Dom DiVincentiis (G)	Canada	Winnipeg Jets	Bolton, Ontario	North Bay Battalion
7	208	Kirill Kudryavtsev (D)	Russia	Vancouver Canucks	Yaroslavl, Russia	Sault Ste. Marie Greyhounds
7	214	Liam Arnsby (C)	Canada	Florida Panthers	Ajax, Ontario	North Bay Battalion
7	215	Kaleb Lawrence (LW)	Canada	Los Angeles Kings	Orleans, Ontario	Owen Sound Attack

== Kubota CHL/NHL Top Prospects Game ==
The Kubota CHL/NHL Top Prospects Game is an annual event in which forty of the top NHL entry draft eligible prospects in the Canadian Hockey League play against each other in an all-star game format. The 2021-22 Kubota CHL/NHL Top Prospects Game was held at the Kitchener Memorial Auditorium in Kitchener, Ontario. Eighteen players from the OHL participated in the event.

=== Team Red ===
Team Red was coached by Jamie McLennan, who is a co-host of the radio show OverDrive and a former NHL goaltender. His assistant coaches were his OverDrive co-host Bryan Hayes, Kitchener Rangers head coach Mike McKenzie and Derek Roy, who was the Rangers captain when they won the 2003 Memorial Cup, before moving on to the NHL.

Ten players from the OHL were named to the Team Red roster. The players included were Luca Del Bel Belluz, Mississauga Steelheads; Michael Buchinger, Guelph Storm; Jorian Donovan, Hamilton Bulldogs; Isaiah George, London Knights; David Goyette, Sudbury Wolves; Hunter Haight, Barrie Colts; Ty Nelson, North Bay Battalion; Matt Poitras, Guelph Storm; Shane Wright, Kingston Frontenacs; and Danny Zhilkin, Guelph Storm. Wright was named captain of the team.

During the game, Wright scored the opening goal of the game 3:43 into the first period, as Zhilkin earned an assist. This would be the only goal of the game for Team Red, as they lost the game 3-1. Wright was named Team Red player of the game.

=== Team White ===
Team White was coached by former Guelph Storm and NHL player Jeff O'Neill, who is a co-host of the radio show OverDrive. His assistant coaches were Guelph Storm head coach George Burnett, former Ottawa 67's head coach Brian Kilrea, Leafs Lunch radio show host Michael Distefano, and former Ottawa 67's assistant coach Bert O'Brien.

Eight players from the OHL were named to the roster. The players included were Owen Beck, Mississauga Steelheads; Ruslan Gazizov, London Knights; Jake Karabela, Guelph Storm; Paul Ludwinski, Kingston Frontenacs; Bryce McConnell-Barker, Sault Ste. Marie Greyhounds; Pavel Mintyukov, Saginaw Spirit; Vinzenz Rohrer, Ottawa 67's; and Matyas Sapovaliv, Saginaw Spirit.

Karabela scored a goal and earned an assist for the White Team in a 3-1 victory.

=== Game Summary ===
Shane Wright of the Kingston Frontenacs opened the scoring for Team Red at 3:43 into the first period, as Danny Zhilkin of the Guelph Storm and Matthew Seminoff of the Kamloops Blazers earned assists for an early 1-0 lead. Team White tied the game midway through the period as Jagger Firkus of the Moose Jaw Warriors scored at 13:44. Jake Karabela of the Guelph Storm earned the lone assist on the goal. Team White outshot Team Red 12-4 in the period.

In the second period, Team White took a 2-1 lead, as Jake Karabela of the Guelph Storm scored, as Jagger Firkus of the Moose Jaw Warriors earned the assist, giving both players two points in the game, 5:20 into the period. Just over three minutes later, at 8:23, Nathan Gaucher of the Quebec Remparts scored to give Team White a 3-1 lead, as Antonin Verreault of the Gatineau Olympiques and Denton Mateychuk of the Moose Jaw Warriors earned assists. Midway through the period, both teams made a goaltender substitution. Ivan Zhigalov of the Sherbrooke Phoenix made 13 saves on 16 shots for Team Red, while Tyler Brennan of the Prince George Cougars faced only four shots, stopping three of them for Team White. Following the goaltending changes, there were no more goals in the period. Team White continued to dominate, as they outshot Team Red 12-5 in the period and 24-9 overall in the game through two periods.

Neither team would score in the third, as Team White held on to a 3-1 victory. In the period, Team White outshot Team Red 15-11, as they finished the game with a 39-20 advantage. Team Red goaltender Reid Dyck of the Swift Current Broncos stopped all 23 shots he faced in the game, while Team White goalie Mason Beaupit of the Spokane Chiefs stopped all 16 shots he saw after coming into the game.

Shane Wright was named Team Red Player of the Game, as he scored the lone goal for the team. Jagger Firkus was named the Team White Player of the Game, as he scored the first goal of the game for his team, while adding an assist on the game winning goal. Attendance for the game at the Kitchener Memorial Auditorium was 5,969.

March 23	Team White	3 – 1	Team Red	Kitchener Memorial Auditorium	Recap
Jagger Firkus (1) - 13:44		First period	3:43 - Shane Wright (1)
Jake Karabela (1) - 5:20; Nathan Gaucher (1) - 8:23		Second period	No scoring
No scoring		Third period	No scoring
Tyler Brennan (3 saves / 4 shots); Mason Beaupit (16 saves / 16 shots)		Goalie stats	(13 saves / 16 shots) Ivan Zhigalov (23 saves / 23 shots) Reid Dyck

== 2022 IIHF World Junior Championship ==
The 2022 IIHF World Junior Championship was originally held at Peavey Mart Centrium in Red Deer, Alberta and at Rogers Place in Edmonton, Alberta starting on December 26, 2021. The tournament was scheduled to end on January 5, 2022. On December 29, 2021, the IIHF Council cancelled the remainder of the tournament due to the ongoing COVID-19 pandemic and spread of the Omicron variant.

In February 2022, it was announced that the tournament would be replayed from scratch at a later date, with all statistics and results from the first playing being thrown out. The tournament was rescheduled to run from August 9-22, 2022 with all games played at Rogers Place in Edmonton, Alberta.

Twenty-four current and former OHL players were on nine rosters in this tournament, including nine on Canada, three on Czechia, three on Switzerland, two on Finland, Germany and the United States, and one on Latvia, Slovakia and Sweden.

=== Canada ===
The Canadian team had seven current and former OHL players on their roster. The players on the Canadian team who currently played in the OHL were: Brett Brochu, London Knights; Will Cuylle, Windsor Spitfires; Ethan Del Mastro, Mississauga Steelheads; Tyson Foerster, Barrie Colts; Mason McTavish, Hamilton Bulldogs; Ryan O'Rourke, Sault Ste. Marie Greyhounds; Brennan Othmann, Flint Firebirds; and Jack Thompson, Sault Ste. Marie Greyhounds. Former Kitchener Rangers player Donovan Sebrango, who played with the Grand Rapids Griffins of the American Hockey League in 2021-22, was also named to the team.

McTavish, who was named captain of the team, led the tournament in scoring, as he registered eight goals and 17 points in nine games. Foerster scored three goals and six points in seven games, while Othmann had two goals and six points in six games. Cuylle recorded two goals and four points in seven games and Thompson scored a goal and four points in seven games. Sebrango earned two assists in seven games, O'Rourke had one assist in seven games, and Del Mastro was held off the scoresheet in six games. In goal, Brochu did not see any game action.

Canada finished the round robin portion of the tournament with a perfect 4-0-0-0 record, earning twelve points and first place in Group A. In the quarter-finals, Canada defeated Switzerland 6-3, followed by a 5-2 win over Czechia in the semi-finals. In the gold medal game, Canada defeated Finland in overtime by a score of 3-2 to win the tournament.

=== Czechia ===
Team Czechia had three OHL players on their roster. The players named to the team were: Pavel Cajan, Kitchener Rangers; Jan Myšák, Hamilton Bulldogs; and Matyas Sapovaliv, Saginaw Spirit.

Myšák was named captain of the team and led Czechia in scoring with four goals and eight points in seven games. Sapovaliv scored two goals and seven games. Cajan appeared in one game, going 0-1-0 with a 3.00 GAA and a .889 save percentage.

Czechia finished the round robin in fourth place in group A, as the team earned a record of 1-0-1-2, earning four points. In the playoff round, Czechia upset the United States in the quarter-finals, winning 4-2. In the semi-final, the team lost to Canada by a 5-2 score. In the bronze medal game, Czechia lost to Sweden by a score of 3-1 to finish in fourth place in the tournament.

=== Finland ===
Team Finland had one current OHL player and one former player on their team. Leevi Merilainen of the Kingston Frontenacs was the lone current OHL player. Former Windsor Spitfires player Ruben Rafkin, who moved on to HC TPS of SM-liiga for the 2021-22 season, also made the team.

In seven games, Rafkin earned an assist for Finland. Merilainen posted a 3-1-0 record with a 2.70 GAA and a .893 save percentage in four goals.

Finland finished in second place in Group A during the round robin, earning a record of 2-1-0-1 for eight points. In the quarter-finals, Finland defeated Germany 5-2, followed by a 1-0 shutout win over Sweden in the semi-finals, earning a berth into the gold medal game. In the final game of the tournament, Finland lost to Canada 3-2 in overtime, winning the silver medal and finishing in second place.

=== Germany ===
Team Germany had one current OHL player and one former player on their roster. Ryan Del Monte of the Barrie Colts was the lone current player that made the team, while former Owen Sound Attack player Josh Samanski, who played the 2021-22 season with the Straubing Tigers of the DEL was named to represent his country.

Samanski finished tied for third in team scoring, as he recorded a goal and three points in four games. Del Monte recorded no points in three games.

Germany finished in third place in the Group B standings, earning a record of 2-0-0-2 for six points. In the quarter-finals, Germany lost to Finland 5-2 and was eliminated from the tournament, finishing in sixth place.

=== Latvia ===
Latvia had a future OHL player on their roster. Sandis Vilmanis, who was drafted by the Sarnia Sting with the 14th overall selection at the 2022 CHL Import Draft, was named to the team.

In five games, Vilmanis earned an assist.

Latvia finished the round robin in third place in Group A with a 1-0-1-2 record, earning six points. In the quarter-finals, Latvia lost a close game to Sweden by 2-1 score and were eliminated from the tournament. The country finished in seventh place in the tournament.

=== Slovakia ===
Team Slovakia had one OHL player on their roster, as Servac Petrovsky of the Owen Sound Attack was named to the team.

Petrovsky finished in second place on the team with two goals, and tied for third place with three points, in four games played.

Slovakia finished the tournament in fifth place in Group A with a record of 0-1-0-3, earning two points. The team did not qualify for the playoff round and finished the tournament in ninth place.

=== Sweden ===
Team Sweden had one OHL player on their roster. Oskar Olausson of the Oshawa Generals was the lone OHL player named to the team.

In seven games, Olausson recorded a goal and five points, finishing tied for third in team scoring.

Sweden finished the round robin portion of the tournament with a 3-0-0-1 record, earning nine points and second place in Group B. In the quarter-finals, Sweden defeated Latvia 2-1, earning a berth into the semi-finals. In their semi-final match against Finland, Sweden was shutout 1-0, sending them to the bronze medal game. Sweden earned the bronze medal and third place in the tournament with a 3-1 win over Czechia in their final game.

=== Switzerland ===
Team Switzerland named two current OHL players and one former player to their team. Rodwin Dionicio, Niagara IceDogs and Brian Zanetti, Peterborough Petes were the current players named to represent their country. Former IceDogs player Giancarlo Chanton, who finished the 2021-22 season with SC Langenthal of the Swiss League, was also named to the team.

Zanetti recorded two assists in four games, while Dionicio had no points in five games. Chanton also finished the tournament off the scoresheet with no points in five games.

Switzerland finished the round robin with a 1-0-0-3 record, earning three points, and fourth place in Group B. In their quarter-final match, Switzerland lost to Canada 6-3 and was eliminated from the tournament. Switzerland finished in eighth place.

=== United States ===
The United States had two players of the OHL on their roster. The players were Andrew Oke of the Saginaw Spirit and Sasha Pastujov of the Guelph Storm.

In five games, Pastujov scored a goal and earned four points. Oke appeared in one game, going 1-0-0 with a 0.00 GAA and a 1.000 save percentage in 40 minutes of play.

The United States finished in first place in Group B with a 4-0-0-0 record, earning 12 points. In the quarter-finals, the USA was upset by Czechia, losing 4-2, to eliminate the team from the tournament. The United States finished in fifth place.

== 2022 IIHF U-20 Division 1A Championship ==
The 2022 IIHF U-20 Division 1A Championship was held in Hørsholm, Denmark from December 12 until December 18, 2021. Four current and former OHL players were on three teams in this tournament.

=== Belarus ===
Team Belarus had one current and one former OHL player on their roster. The players were Dmitry Kuzmin of the Flint Firebirds and former Kingston Frontenacs player Vitali Pinchuk, who plays for Dinamo Minsk of the KHL.

Pinchuk finished second on team scoring with two goals and nine points in five games, while Kuzmin scored a goal and five points in five games.

During the tournament, Belarus finished in first place with a 5-0-0 record, earning 15 points. The team was promoted to the top division, and will compete at the 2023 IIHF World Junior Championship.

=== Denmark ===
Team Denmark had one OHL player on their roster as Kasper Larsen of the Mississauga Steelheads was named to the team.

Larsen appeared in five games in the tournament, scoring two goals and adding two assists for four points.

During the tournament, Denmark finished with a 1-4-0 record, earning three points and finishing in fifth place.

=== Norway ===
Team Norway had one OHL player on their roster as Ole Bjorgvik-Holm of the Mississauga Steelheads was named to the team.

Bjorgvik-Holm was named as the captain of the team. He earned two goals and six points in five games.

During the tournament, Norway finished in third place with a 3-2-0 record, earning nine points.

== 2022 IIHF U-20 Division 1B Championship ==
The 2022 IIHF U-20 Division 1B Championship was held in Tallinn, Estonia from December 12 until December 18, 2021. One OHL player participated in the tournament.

=== Ukraine ===
Team Ukraine had one OHL player on their roster, as Artur Cholach of the Barrie Colts was named to the team.

In five games, Cholach earned eight assists, finishing fourth in team scoring.

During the tournament, Ukraine finished in fourth place with eight points.

Preceded by 2020–21 OHL season	OHL seasons	Succeeded by 2022–23 OHL season
