= Logan Morrison (ice hockey) =

Canadian ice hockey player (born 2002)

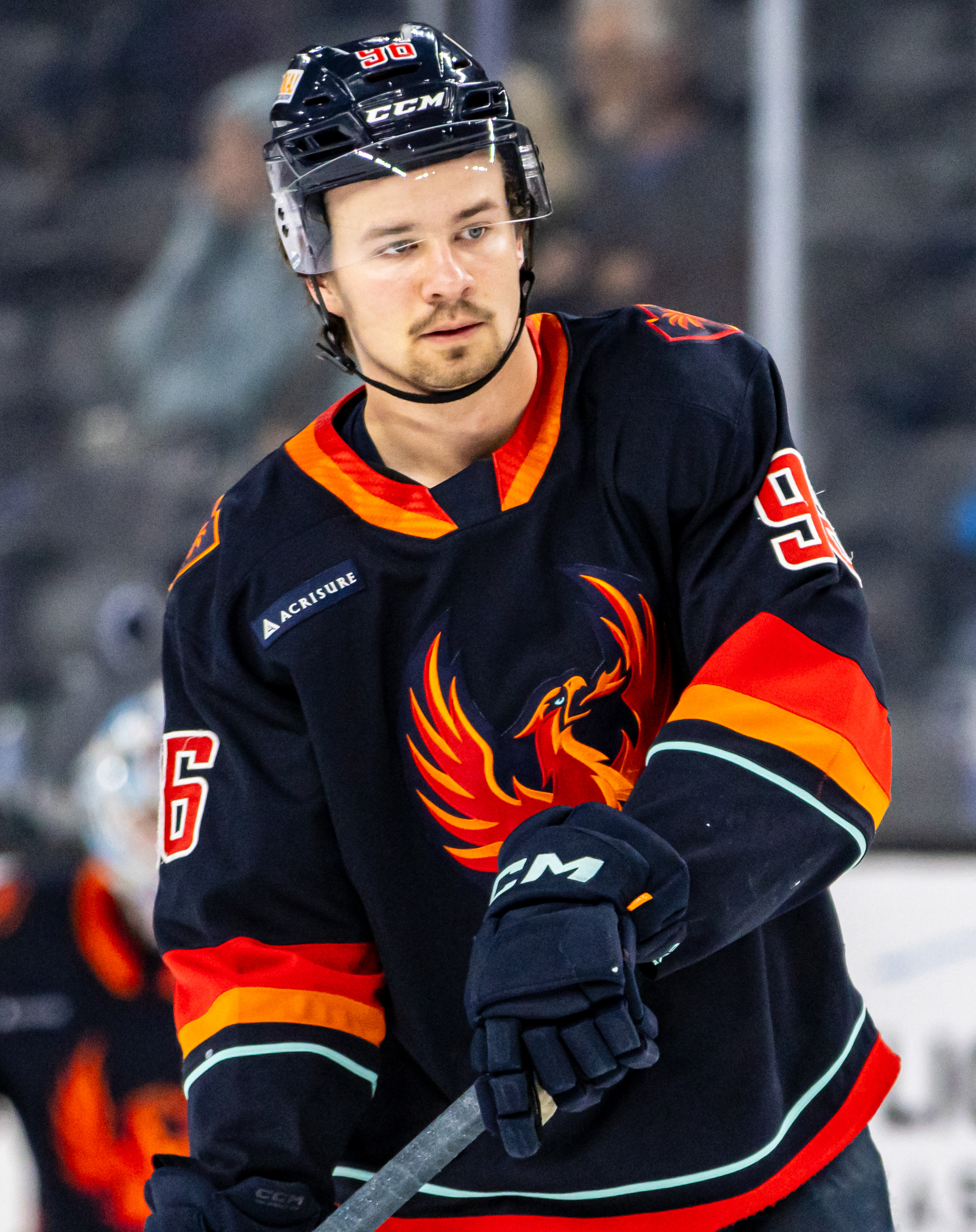
- Morrison with the Coachella Valley Firebirds in 2024
- Born: July 9, 2002 (age 24) Guelph, Ontario, Canada
- Height: 6 ft 0 in (183 cm)
- Weight: 180 lb (82 kg; 12 st 12 lb)
- Position: Forward
- Shoots: Right
- NHL team (P) Cur. team: Seattle Kraken; Coachella Valley Firebirds (AHL)
- NHL draft: Undrafted
- Playing career: 2023–present

Logan Morrison (born July 9, 2002) is a Canadian professional ice hockey forward for the Coachella Valley Firebirds of the American Hockey League (AHL) while under contract to the Seattle Kraken of the National Hockey League (NHL).

== Playing career ==
=== Junior ===
Starting in the 2015–16 season, Morrison played hockey in the South-Central Triple A Hockey League (SCTA), with the Guelph Jr. Gryphons. During the 2017–18 season, he scored 38 goals and manage 86 points in 36 games. He then had a brief stint with the Guelph Jr. Hurricanes of the Greater Ontario Junior Hockey League (GOJHL) in 2018, only playing two games.

Morrison then selected in the 2018 Ontario Hockey League (OHL) Priority Selection by the Hamilton Bulldogs in the first round (18th overall). Over the course of his rookie season, Morrison managed 14 goals and 20 assists for 34 points in 47 games with the Bulldogs. On October 5, 2018, he scored his first OHL goal against the Oshawa Generals, with 1:24 remaining in the third period of a 7–1 loss. On December 13, 2019, he recorded his first OHL hat-trick against the Kitchener Rangers, in a 9–6 loss. During the 2021–22 season, Morrison recorded 100 points in 60 games, leading the team. Morrison was also named playoff's most valuable player (MVP), winning the Wayne Gretzky 99 Award, as he had scored 19 goals and managed 39 points through 19 games.

Morrison started the 2022–23 season with the Bulldogs, but was traded at the OHL deadline in January to the Ottawa 67's for 6 draft picks. With the 67's, Morrison scored 20 goals and notched 19 assists in 22 games. In the playoffs, he scored 10 goals in 11 games, leading the team in scoring.

=== Professional ===
On April 12, 2023, Morrison signed a three-year, entry-level contract with the Seattle Kraken, set to begin in the 2023–24 season. Before the start of the 2023–24 season, Morrison was sent down to the Kraken's American Hockey League (AHL) affiliate, the Coachella Valley Firebirds.

On March 24, 2024, following the Kraken's 5–1 loss to the Montreal Canadiens, Morrison, along with Ryan Winterton, were recalled from the Firebirds. He made his NHL debut with the Kraken on March 26 against the Anaheim Ducks in a 4–0 win, when he played on the same line as Winterton and Tye Kartye.

== Personal life ==
Morrison's uncle is former NHL player John Cullen. His grandfather is former NHL player Barry Cullen. His brother, Mitch, was drafted in the OHL by the Saginaw Spirit.

== Career statistics ==
			Regular season					Playoffs
Season	Team	League	GP	G	A	Pts	PIM	GP	G	A	Pts	PIM
2015–16	Guelph Jr. Gryphons	SCTA	—	—	—	—	—	—	—	—	—	—
2016–17	Guelph Jr. Gryphons	SCTA	35	17	19	36	0	—	—	—	—	—
2017–18	Guelph Jr. Gryphons	SCTA	33	32	42	74	22	—	—	—	—	—
2017–18	Guelph Hurricanes	GOJHL	2	0	0	0	0	—	—	—	—	—
2018–19	Hamilton Bulldogs	OHL	47	14	20	34	6	4	0	1	1	0
2019–20	Hamilton Bulldogs	OHL	59	23	22	45	18	—	—	—	—	—
2021–22	Hamilton Bulldogs	OHL	60	34	66	100	8	19	17	22	39	2
2022–23	Hamilton Bulldogs	OHL	34	20	35	55	8	—	—	—	—	—
2022–23	Ottawa 67's	OHL	22	20	19	39	4	11	10	6	16	4
2023–24	Coachella Valley Firebirds	AHL	64	16	25	41	4	18	1	9	10	2
2023–24	Seattle Kraken	NHL	4	0	0	0	0	—	—	—	—	—
2024–25	Coachella Valley Firebirds	AHL	72	14	28	42	16	6	0	3	3	2
2025–26	Coachella Valley Firebirds	AHL	68	29	32	61	42	12	1	5	6	0
NHL totals			4	0	0	0	0	—	—	—	—	—

== Awards and honors ==
Award	Year	Ref
OHL
Wayne Gretzky 99 Award	2021–22	
