= Staios =

Staios is a surname. Notable people with the surname include:

- Steve Staios (born 1973), Canadian ice hockey executive and former right defenceman

- Nathan Staios (born 2001), Canadian-American ice hockey defenceman, son of Steve Staios
