= Jorian Donovan =

Canadian ice hockey player (born 2004)

- Born: April 5, 2004 (age 22) Calgary, Alberta, Canada
- Height: 6 ft 2 in (188 cm)
- Weight: 200 lb (91 kg; 14 st 4 lb)
- Position: Defence
- Shoots: Left
- NHL team (P) Cur. team: Ottawa Senators; Belleville Senators (AHL)
- NHL draft: 136th overall, 2022; Ottawa Senators
- Playing career: 2024–present

Jorian Donovan (born April 5, 2004) is a Canadian professional ice hockey player who is a defenceman for the Belleville Senators of the American Hockey League (AHL) while under contract to the Ottawa Senators of the National Hockey League (NHL). He was selected 136th overall by the Senators in the 2022 NHL entry draft.

== Early life ==
Donovan was born in Calgary, Alberta while his father, Shean Donovan, was a member of the National Hockey League's Calgary Flames.

== Playing career ==
=== Amateur ===
Donovan was selected by the Hamilton Bulldogs of the Ontario Hockey League (OHL) in the first round, sixth overall, in the 2020 OHL Priority Draft. He made his OHL debut in the 2021–21 season and scored three goals and 19 assists for 22 points in 64 games. The Bulldogs set a league record with 51 wins in the season and in the playoffs, advanced to the league final where they beat the Windsor Spitfires to win the J. Ross Robertson Cup as league champions. Donovan added one goal and three points in 13 playoff games. As league champions, the Bulldogs were among the teams invited to the 2022 Memorial Cup, a round-robin tournament in which the champions of the three leagues that comprise the Canadian Hockey League and a host team face off. The Bulldogs made the Memorial Cup final but were defeated by the Saint John Sea Dogs to finish second.

In his second season in 2022–23, Donovan recorded 12 goals and 45 points in 55 games. The Bulldogs made the playoffs again, but were eliminated in the opening round by the Barrie Colts. In six playoff games, he added one goal and three points. In the offseason the team was relocated to Brantford, Ontario, becoming the Brantford Bulldogs. In his first season in Brantford in 2023–24, he tallied nine goals and 28 points in 34 games before he was traded to the Saginaw Spirit at the OHL trade deadline on January 8, 2024, in exchange for eight draft picks. He played the rest of the season with Saginaw, posting four goals and 18 points in 32 games. The Spirit qualified for the playoffs and advanced to the Western Conference Finals where they were knocked out of contention by the eventual OHL-champion London Knights. In 17 playoffs games, Donovan added three goals and nine points. However, as host city of the 2024 Memorial Cup, Saginaw was one of the four teams to compete in the tournament. They advanced to the final where they defeated the Knights to win the championship, the first in franchise history.

=== Professional ===
Donovan was selected in the fifth round, 136th overall, by the NHL's Ottawa Senators in the 2022 NHL entry draft, and signed a three-year entry level contract with Ottawa in September 2022. Donovan joined Ottawa's American Hockey League affiliate, the Belleville Senators at the end of the 2022–23 season for a brief two-game stint in which he went scoreless. He rejoined Belleville for his first full professional season in 2024–25 in which scored three goals and 12 points in 64 games. Belleville failed to make the playoffs. He was returned to Belleville for the 2025–26 season after Ottawa's training camp. He was recalled on March 24, 2026 after injuries to Thomas Chabot and Lassi Thomson. He made his NHL debut that night against the Detroit Red Wings. This made Jorian and his father, Shean, the first father-son duo to suit up for the Senators in an NHL game. He played in a second game against the Pittsburgh Penguins, going scoreless in both before being returned to Belleville on March 29. He was recalled again on April 4 due an injury to Tyler Kleven, but did not play and was returned to Belleville. He finished the season with Belleville, recording four goals and 21 points in 61 games. He was assigned to Belleville to start the 2026–27 season but was briefly recalled on October 5. He did not appear with Ottawa before he was returned to the AHL. He was recalled again on October 11 after injuries decimated the Senators blueline. He made one appearance with Ottawa before he was returned to Belleville on October 15.

== International play ==
Donovan was invited to Canada's junior team tryout camp for the 2024 World Junior Championships, but was one of the final cuts. However, after Tanner Molendyk was injured, Donovan was added to the roster. He appeared in five games, going scoreless, as Canada was eliminated in the quarterfinals of the tournament by Czechia.

== Career statistics ==
			Regular season					Playoffs
Season	Team	League	GP	G	A	Pts	PIM	GP	G	A	Pts	PIM
2021–22	Hamilton Bulldogs	OHL	64	3	19	22	29	13	1	2	3	4
2022–23	Hamilton Bulldogs	OHL	55	12	33	45	41	6	1	3	4	4
2022–23	Belleville Senators	AHL	2	0	0	0	0	—	—	—	—	—
2023–24	Brantford Bulldogs	OHL	34	9	19	28	34	—	—	—	—	—
2023–24	Saginaw Spirit	OHL	32	4	14	18	39	17	3	6	9	8
2024–25	Belleville Senators	AHL	64	3	9	12	83	—	—	—	—	—
2025–26	Belleville Senators	AHL	61	4	17	21	89	—	—	—	—	—
2025–26	Ottawa Senators	NHL	2	0	0	0	0	—	—	—	—	—
AHL totals			2	0	0	0	0	—	—	—	—	—
