= Ethan Cardwell =

Canadian ice hockey player (born 2002)

- Born: August 30, 2002 (age 23) Oshawa, Ontario, Canada
- Height: 5 ft 11 in (180 cm)
- Weight: 180 lb (82 kg; 12 st 12 lb)
- Position: Right wing
- Shoots: Right
- NHL team (P) Cur. team: San Jose Sharks; San Jose Barracuda (AHL)
- NHL draft: 121st overall, 2021; San Jose Sharks
- Playing career: 2023–present

Ethan Cardwell (born August 30, 2002) is a Canadian professional ice hockey right wing currently playing for the San Jose Barracuda in the American Hockey League (AHL) as a prospect to the San Jose Sharks in the National Hockey League.

== Playing career ==
Cardwell was selected by the San Jose Sharks in the fourth-round, 121st overall, of the 2021 NHL entry draft. He was signed to a three-year, entry-level contract with the Sharks on April 15, 2023. He re-signed with the Sharks on a one-year contract in June 2026.

== Career statistics ==
| | | | Regular season | | | | | Playoffs |
| Season | Team | League | GP | G | A | Pts | PIM | GP | G | A | Pts | PIM |
|---|---|---|---|---|---|---|---|---|---|---|---|---|
| 2017–18 | Wellington Dukes | OJHL | 2 | 0 | 0 | 0 | 0 | 3 | 0 | 0 | 0 | 0 |
| 2018–19 | Trenton Golden Hawks | OJHL | 27 | 5 | 12 | 17 | 20 | — | — | — | — | — |
| 2018–19 | Saginaw Spirit | OHL | 15 | 5 | 0 | 5 | 2 | 5 | 1 | 0 | 1 | 0 |
| 2018–19 | Pickering Panthers | OJHL | 14 | 4 | 7 | 11 | 2 | — | — | — | — | — |
| 2019–20 | Saginaw Spirit | OHL | 37 | 12 | 9 | 21 | 21 | — | — | — | — | — |
| 2019–20 | Barrie Colts | OHL | 26 | 11 | 15 | 26 | 20 | — | — | — | — | — |
| 2020–21 | Surahammars IF | Div.1 | 18 | 9 | 18 | 27 | 22 | — | — | — | — | — |
| 2021–22 | Barrie Colts | OHL | 49 | 23 | 35 | 58 | 28 | 6 | 4 | 2 | 6 | 7 |
| 2022–23 | Barrie Colts | OHL | 62 | 43 | 47 | 90 | 21 | 12 | 6 | 5 | 11 | 12 |
| 2023–24 | San Jose Barracuda | AHL | 71 | 23 | 20 | 43 | 52 | — | — | — | — | — |
| 2024–25 | San Jose Barracuda | AHL | 63 | 11 | 37 | 48 | 40 | 5 | 0 | 2 | 2 | 2 |
| 2024–25 | San Jose Sharks | NHL | 6 | 1 | 0 | 1 | 2 | — | — | — | — | — |
| 2025–26 | San Jose Barracuda | AHL | 24 | 7 | 8 | 15 | 17 | — | — | — | — | — |
| 2025–26 | San Jose Sharks | NHL | 7 | 1 | 0 | 1 | 2 | — | — | — | — | — |
| NHL totals | | | 13 | 2 | 0 | 2 | 4 | — | — | — | — | — |
