= Avery Hayes =

American ice hockey player (born 2002)

- Born: October 10, 2002 (age 24) Westland, Michigan, U.S.
- Height: 5 ft 10 in (178 cm)
- Weight: 180 lb (82 kg; 12 st 12 lb)
- Position: Right wing
- Shoots: Right
- NHL team (P) Cur. team: Pittsburgh Penguins; WBS Penguins (AHL)
- NHL draft: Undrafted
- Playing career: 2023–present

Avery Hayes (born October 10, 2002) is an American professional ice hockey player who is a right winger for the Wilkes-Barre/Scranton Penguins in the American Hockey League (AHL) as a prospect to the Pittsburgh Penguins of the National Hockey League (NHL).

== Playing career ==
Hayes played major junior ice hockey in the Ontario Hockey League (OHL) for the Hamilton Bulldogs, and was later traded to the Peterborough Petes. Undrafted, he began his professional career with the American Hockey League (AHL)'s Wilkes-Barre/Scranton Penguins in 2023. In the midst of a productive 2024–25 AHL season, Wilkes-Barre/Scranton's National Hockey League (NHL) affiliate, the Pittsburgh Penguins, signed Hayes to a two-year entry-level contract set to begin in 2025–26.

With Blake Lizotte away from the team with his expectant wife and Noel Acciari and Rickard Rakell dealing with illness and injury, respectively, Hayes was recalled to make his NHL debut on February 5, 2026. He would score his first two NHL goals that night in a 5–2 Penguins win over the Buffalo Sabres.

== International play ==
In August 2019, Hayes represented the United States under-18 team at the 2019 Hlinka Gretzky Cup.

== Personal life ==
Hayes is the oldest of four brothers, all of which play hockey. Gavin plays for the Rockford IceHogs as a prospect of the Chicago Blackhawks, who drafted him in the third round of the 2022 draft. Travis is a forward for the Soo Greyhounds and was a teammate of Gavin's during the 2023–24 season; the Penguins drafted Travis in the fourth round of the 2025 draft. His youngest brother Elijah was later drafted 241st overall by the Soo Greyhounds in the 2025 OHL Priority Selection.

== Career statistics ==
=== Regular season and playoffs ===
			Regular season					Playoffs
Season	Team	League	GP	G	A	Pts	PIM	GP	G	A	Pts	PIM
2018–19	Hamilton Bulldogs	OHL	64	7	11	18	22	4	0	1	1	0
2019–20	Hamilton Bulldogs	OHL	42	15	14	29	8	—	—	—	—	—
2020–21	HK Levice	Slovakia2	14	3	6	9	0	2	0	0	0	0
2021–22	Hamilton Bulldogs	OHL	66	41	38	79	37	16	14	20	34	19
2022–23	Hamilton Bulldogs	OHL	33	27	14	41	40	—	—	—	—	—
2022–23	Peterborough Petes	OHL	32	16	20	36	12	22	12	7	19	14
2023–24	Wilkes-Barre/Scranton Penguins	AHL	29	6	3	9	6	2	0	0	0	0
2023–24	Wheeling Nailers	ECHL	1	0	0	0	0	—	—	—	—	—
2024–25	Wilkes-Barre/Scranton Penguins	AHL	60	23	19	42	58	2	1	0	1	2
2025–26	Wilkes-Barre/Scranton Penguins	AHL	42	24	15	39	48	15	3	3	6	40
2025–26	Pittsburgh Penguins	NHL	16	5	0	5	12	—	—	—	—	—
NHL totals			16	5	0	5	12	—	—	—	—	—

=== International ===
Year	Team	Event	Result	GP	G	A	Pts	PIM
2019	United States	HG18	6th	4	1	1	2	2
Junior totals				4	1	1	2	2
