= Luke Evangelista =

Canadian ice hockey player (born 2002)

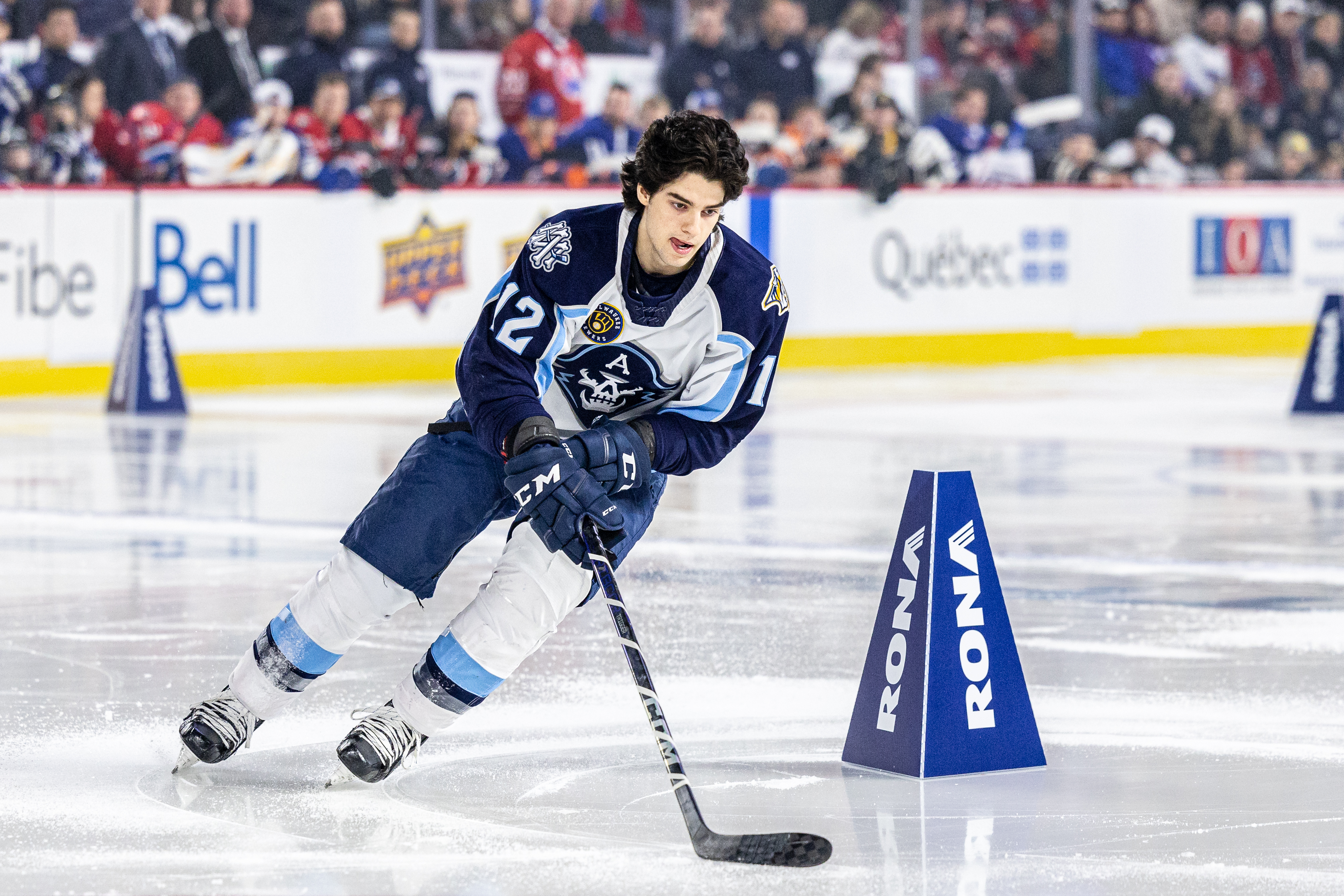
- Evangelista at the 2023 AHL All-Star Skills Competition
- Born: February 21, 2002 (age 24) Oakville, Ontario, Canada
- Height: 6 ft 0 in (183 cm)
- Weight: 183 lb (83 kg; 13 st 1 lb)
- Position: Right wing
- Shoots: Right
- NHL team Former teams: New Jersey Devils; Nashville Predators
- NHL draft: 42nd overall, 2020; Nashville Predators
- Playing career: 2021–present

Luke Evangelista (born February 21, 2002) is a Canadian professional ice hockey player who is a right winger for the New Jersey Devils of the National Hockey League (NHL). He was selected 42nd overall by the Nashville Predators in the 2020 NHL entry draft.

== Playing career ==
Evangelista played as a youth with the Oakville Rangers in the SCTA before playing major junior hockey with London Knights in the Ontario Hockey League (OHL). He was selected in the second round, 42nd overall, of the 2020 NHL entry draft by the Nashville Predators.

With the following 2020–21 OHL season firstly delayed and later cancelled due to the COVID-19 pandemic, he was signed to a three-year, entry-level contract with the Predators on November 9, 2020. With the resumption of professional hockey Evangelista joined the Predators AHL affiliate, the Milwaukee Admirals, and made his professional debut in registering 4 assists through 14 regular season games.

Evangelista returned to junior hockey for the 2021–22 season, captaining the Knights and leading the team in all offensive categories with a league leading 55 goals and 56 assists for 111 points in only 62 regular season games.

After participating in the 2022 Nashville Predators training camp, Evangelista was reassigned to begin the 2022–23 season with the Admirals. With his offensive game translating to the professional ranks, Evangelista immediately assumed a role on the Admirals top scoring line and was leading the team in scoring when selected to represent the team at the AHL All-Star Classic. On February 28, 2023, Evangelista received his first recall by the Predators and made his NHL debut against the Pittsburgh Penguins that night in a 3–1 defeat. In the following games he recorded his first point, an assist on a goal to Matt Duchene, in a 2–1 victory over the Florida Panthers on March 3, 2023. In increasing his ice-time, Evangelista notched his first two goals of his career against the Vancouver Canucks in a 4–3 shootout defeat on March 7, 2023.

On September 1, 2026, the Predators traded Evangelista to the New Jersey Devils in exchange for a conditional 2028 first-round pick and a 2028 second-round pick. On September 15, he signed a five-year contract extension with the Devils.

== Personal life ==
Luke is the son of Andrew and Margaret Evangelista and has two sisters, Maria and Sophia. He is second cousins to supermodel Linda Evangelista and Toronto Maple Leafs executive Brendan Shanahan.

== Career statistics ==
=== Regular season and playoffs ===
Bold indicates led league

			Regular season					Playoffs
Season	Team	League	GP	G	A	Pts	PIM	GP	G	A	Pts	PIM
2017–18	Oakville Rangers	SCTA	36	39	51	90	30	—	—	—	—	—
2018–19	London Knights	OHL	27	0	2	2	4	—	—	—	—	—
2019–20	London Knights	OHL	62	23	38	61	12	—	—	—	—	—
2020–21	Milwaukee Admirals	AHL	14	0	4	4	4	—	—	—	—	—
2021–22	London Knights	OHL	62	**55**	56	111	48	7	2	4	6	0
2022–23	Milwaukee Admirals	AHL	49	9	32	41	18	16	4	11	15	4
2022–23	Nashville Predators	NHL	24	7	8	15	6	—	—	—	—	—
2023–24	Nashville Predators	NHL	80	16	23	39	18	6	1	0	1	2
2024–25	Nashville Predators	NHL	68	10	22	32	22	—	—	—	—	—
2025–26	Nashville Predators	NHL	81	12	44	56	28	—	—	—	—	—
NHL totals			253	45	97	142	74	6	1	0	1	2

=== International ===
Year	Team	Event	Result	GP	G	A	Pts	PIM
2018	Canada White	U17	6th	5	0	1	1	0
Junior totals				5	0	1	1	0

== Awards and honours ==
Award	Year	Ref
OHL
Second All-Star Team	2018	
AHL
All-Star Game	2023	
