= Gavin Hayes =

American ice hockey player (born 2004)

- Born: May 14, 2004 (age 21) Ypsilanti, Michigan, U.S.
- Height: 6 ft 1 in (185 cm)
- Weight: 176 lb (80 kg; 12 st 8 lb)
- Position: Left wing
- Shoots: Right
- NHL team (P) Cur. team: Chicago Blackhawks; Rockford IceHogs (AHL)
- NHL draft: 66th overall, 2022; Chicago Blackhawks
- Playing career: 2024–present

Gavin Hayes (born May 14, 2004) is an American professional ice hockey player who is a left winger for the Rockford IceHogs of the American Hockey League (AHL) as a prospect to the Chicago Blackhawks of the National Hockey League (NHL). He was selected by the Blackhawks in the third round, 66th overall, of the 2022 NHL entry draft.

== Personal life ==
Hayes has three brothers who also play hockey. His older brother, Avery, is a forward under contract to the Pittsburgh Penguins. A younger brother, Travis, is a forward for the Soo Greyhounds and was a teammate of Gavin's during the 2023–24 season. On April 12, 2025, his youngest brother Elijah Hayes was also drafted by the Soo Greyhounds in the 12th round of the OHL Priority Selection.

== Playing career ==
=== Junior ===
Hayes played his junior hockey for the Flint Firebirds of the Ontario Hockey League beginning in the 2021-22 season, a season in which the Firebirds made it to the conference finals where they lost in seven games to the Windsor Spitfires. He achieved his junior career highs with 41 goals and 40 assists (81 points) in 66 games in the 2022-23 season. On January 7, 2024, Hayes was traded to the Sault Ste. Marie Greyhounds. Gavin's brother, Travis Hayes, is also a forward for the Soo Greyhounds.

=== Professional ===
Hayes signed his three-year entry-level contract with the Chicago Blackhawks on April 3, 2023.

In his debut season with the Rockford IceHogs in the 2024–25 AHL season he tallied 5 goals and 10 assists in 50 games in a season that was hampered by a severely sprained shoulder

== Career statistics ==
=== Regular season and playoffs ===
			Regular season					Playoffs
Season	Team	League	GP	G	A	Pts	PIM	GP	G	A	Pts	PIM
2021–22	Flint Firebirds	OHL	65	19	30	49	18	19	5	7	12	8
2022–23	Flint Firebirds	OHL	66	41	40	81	32	7	0	2	2	0
2023–24	Flint Firebirds	OHL	27	19	17	36	10	—	—	—	—	—
2023–24	Soo Greyhounds	OHL	28	18	22	40	10	11	7	9	16	6
2024–25	Rockford IceHogs	AHL	50	5	10	15	10	7	0	2	2	0
2025–26	Rockford IceHogs	AHL	57	13	13	26	14	—	—	—	—	—
AHL totals			107	18	23	41	24	7	0	2	2	0

=== International ===
Year	Team	Event	Result	GP	G	A	Pts	PIM
2021	United States	HG18	5th	4	2	1	3	2
2024	United States	WJC	1st place, gold medalist(s)	7	0	2	2	25
Junior totals				11	2	3	5	27
