= Ryan Winterton =

Canadian ice hockey player (born 2003)

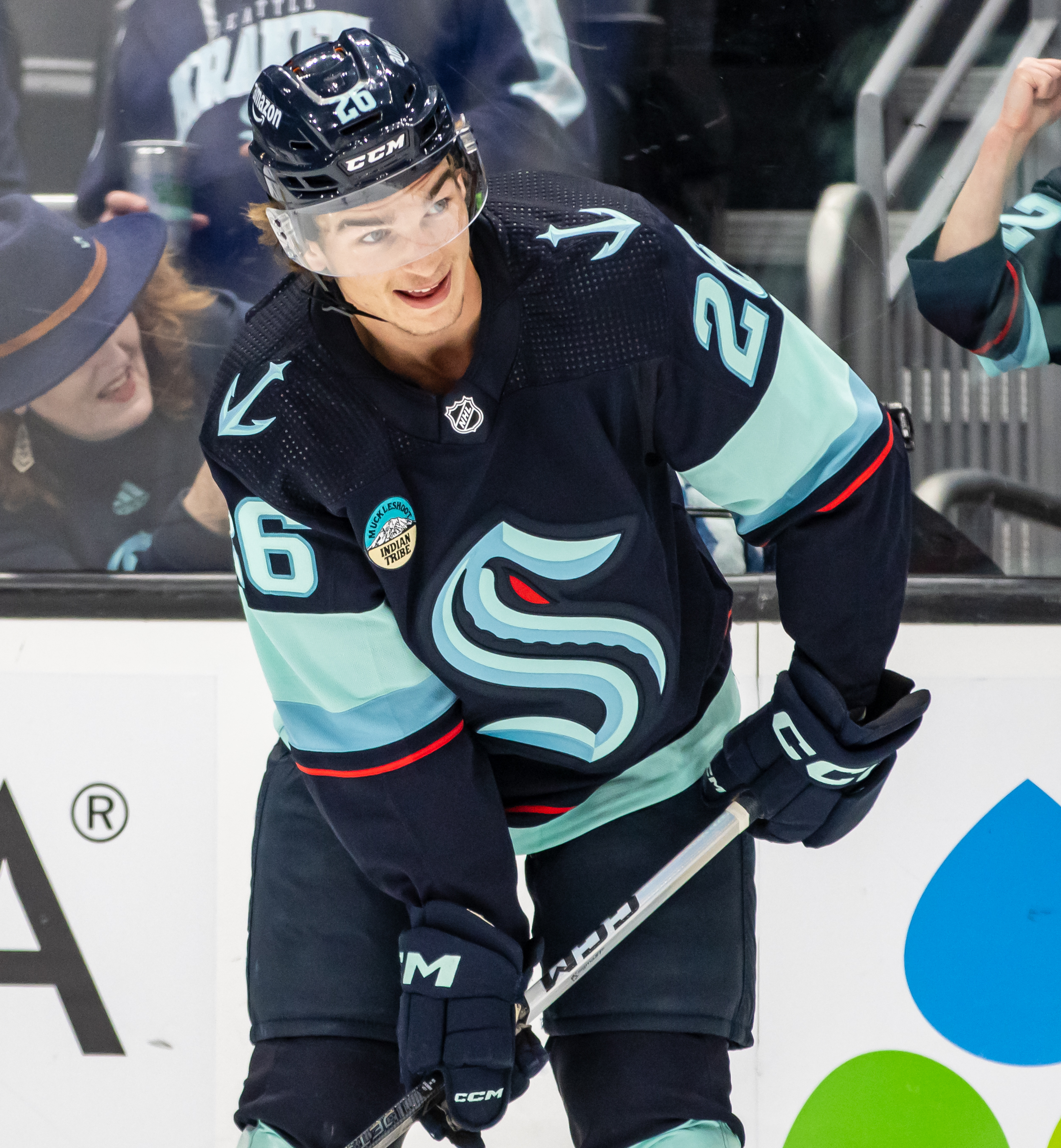
- Winterton with the Seattle Kraken in 2023.
- Born: September 4, 2003 (age 22) Markham, Ontario, Canada
- Height: 6 ft 2 in (188 cm)
- Weight: 175 lb (79 kg; 12 st 7 lb)
- Position: Centre
- Shoots: Right
- NHL team: Seattle Kraken
- NHL draft: 67th overall, 2021; Seattle Kraken
- Playing career: 2023–present

Ryan Winterton (born September 4, 2003) is a Canadian professional ice hockey player who is a centre for the Seattle Kraken of the National Hockey League (NHL). He was selected sixty-seventh overall by the Kraken in the 2021 NHL entry draft.

== Early life ==
Winterton was born on September 4, 2003, in Markham, Ontario, Canada, to parents Lesley and Garth Winterton. His older brother Jacob also played ice hockey and most recently played for the University of Guelph. Jacob died on March 25, 2026 following a battle with cancer.

== Playing career ==
Although he was born in Markham, Winterton began his ice hockey career in Whitby, Ontario with the Whitby Wildcats in the Ontario Minor Hockey Association (OMHA). In the 2018–19 season, Winterton amassed 38 goals and 34 assists through 36 games and helped the Wildcats qualify for the OMHA championship. During the tournament, Winterton and his linemates Brenden Sirizzotti and Thomas Johnston combined for 42 points en route to the championship title. Following the win, Winterton was drafted eighth overall by the Hamilton Bulldogs in the 2019 Ontario Hockey League (OHL) Priority Selection Draft.

=== Amateur ===
Winterton debuted with the Bulldogs during the shortened 2019–20 season. In his OHL debut on September 30, he scored the game-winning goal to lift the Bulldogs to a 4–3 win over the Sarnia Sting. By mid-October, he had added one goal and one assist through nine games and was added to the team's power-play and penalty kill units. As a result, Winterton was selected to represent Team Canada Black at the 2019 World U-17 Hockey Challenge. Winterton tallied three assists through five games as Canada Black finished last in the tournament. Upon returning from the tournament, Winterton found consistency playing alongside Arthur Kaliyev and Jan Myšák and finished the 2019–20 season with 12 goals and 11 assists in 53 games.

Due to COVID-19 playing restrictions, the OHL did not resume play for the 2020–21 season and Winterton missed his sophomore year with the Bulldogs. During the play pause, Winterton play in 5-on-5 and 3-on-3 scrimmages organized by his agent and various coaches. Although he did not play in the OHL, Winterton was selected to represent Team Canada at the 2021 IIHF World U18 Championships. He tallied two goals and two assists for four points as Canada won its fourth gold medal at the U18 Championships. While he was originally listed as a 'C' prospect by the NHL Central Scouting Bureau, he was boosted to a 'B' prospect in January 2021. Winterton was eventually drafted in the third round, 67th overall, by the Seattle Kraken in the 2021 NHL entry draft.

Following the draft, Winterton was expected to participate in the Kraken's training camp before returning to the Bulldogs for the 2021–22 season. However, he suffered a shoulder injury during the Bulldogs 2021 preseason camp and subsequently missed the first half of the OHL season. He was originally expected to miss a month or two but the prognosis resulted in him missing five months of OHL play. During his time off the ice, Winterton rehabilitated his shoulder with the Kraken's sports performance consultant Gary Roberts. Winterton returned to the Bulldogs lineup in February 2022 and immediately tallied seven goals and 11 points through his first 12 games. He added 46 points through 37 regular-season games as he helped lead the Bulldogs to the J. Ross Robertson Cup finals. After adding 19 points through the 2022 OHL playoffs, Winterton suffered a dislocated shoulder injury after scoring in Game 5 against the Windsor Spitfires. While he would miss Game 6, Winterton tallied an assist in Game 7 to win the series and lead the Bulldogs to the 2022 Memorial Cup. After Winterton and Bulldogs fell to the Saint John Sea Dogs in the Memorial Cup, Winterton signed a three-year entry-level contract with the Seattle Kraken.

=== Professional ===
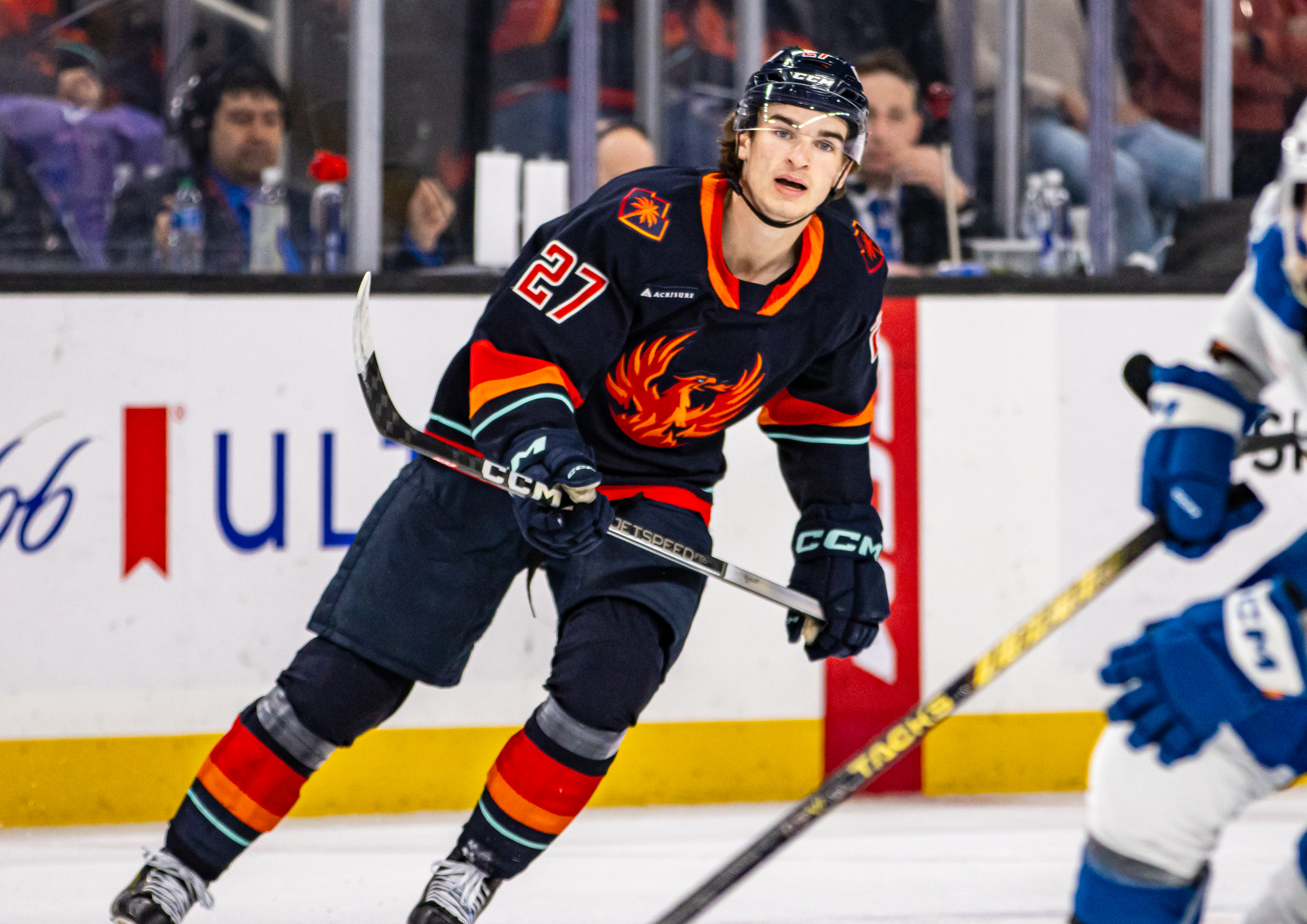
Winterton with the Coachella Valley Firebirds in 2024.

Following the signing of the contract, Winterton participated in the Kraken's training camp ahead of the 2023–24 season. He was cut from training camp on September 29 and reassigned to their American Hockey League (AHL) affiliate, the Coachella Valley Firebirds, to start the season. Winterton made his professional debut and found a steady place on the Firebirds second line with Shane Wright and Cameron Hughes. With these teammates, he quickly accumulated three goals and two assists through his first seven games. On November 9, Winterton and Wright were called up to the NHL level ahead of their game against the Colorado Avalanche. He made his debut that night and played seven minutes of ice time while also registering one shot on goal. He played two more NHL games before being returned to the AHL level. During the 2024 Calder Cup playoffs, Winterton scored seven goals and five assists through 18 games to help the Firebirds advance to the Calder Cup Finals. He scored two of those goals in Game 6 of the Finals before the Firebirds fell in overtime to the Hershey Bears.

After participating in the Kraken's 2024 training camp, Winterton was reassigned to the Coachella Valley Firebirds to start the 2024–25 season. He scored three goals and two assists through seven games before being recalled to the NHL level on November 5, 2024. Winterton played that night in a 6–3 loss to the Colorado Avalanche, where he failed to register a point through 09:28 minutes of ice time. He was subsequently returned to the AHL the following day. Winterton played nine more games in the AHL before being recalled for a second time on November 28. During his second recall, Winterton scored his first career NHL point, an assist, in a 4–2 win over the Carolina Hurricanes on December 3. This would be his only point scored through seven games before he was returned to the Firebirds on December 18.

Winterton was named to the Kraken's 2025–26 season opening roster after impressing the coaching staff during the preseason. He scored his first career NHL goal on November 5, 2025, in a 6-1 loss to the San Jose Sharks.

== Career statistics ==
=== Regular season and playoffs ===
			Regular season					Playoffs
Season	Team	League	GP	G	A	Pts	PIM	GP	G	A	Pts	PIM
2019–20	Hamilton Bulldogs	OHL	53	12	11	23	8	—	—	—	—	—
2021–22	Hamilton Bulldogs	OHL	37	20	26	46	23	18	7	12	19	6
2022–23	London Knights	OHL	34	12	24	36	22	21	13	16	29	10
2023–24	Coachella Valley Firebirds	AHL	58	22	13	35	23	18	7	5	12	12
2023–24	Seattle Kraken	NHL	9	0	0	0	0	—	—	—	—	—
2024–25	Coachella Valley Firebirds	AHL	56	18	19	37	26	4	2	0	2	0
2024–25	Seattle Kraken	NHL	12	0	1	1	2	—	—	—	—	—
2025–26	Seattle Kraken	NHL	68	4	14	18	15	—	—	—	—	—
NHL totals			89	4	15	19	17	—	—	—	—	—

=== International ===
Year	Team	Event	Result	GP	G	A	Pts	PIM
2019	Canada Black	U17	8th	5	0	3	3	0
2021	Canada	U18	1st place, gold medalist(s)	7	2	2	4	2
Junior totals				12	2	5	7	2
