= Kyle Jackson =

Kyle Jackson may refer to:

- Kyle Jackson (American football) (born 1989), American football player
- Kyle Jackson (baseball) (born 2002), American baseball player
- Mongraal (Kyle Jackson, born 2004), British gamer
