= Brett Harrison =

American technology entrepreneur and finance executive (born 1988)

- Born: Brett Alexander Harrison; May 11, 1988 (age 38); New York City, U.S.
- Education: Harvard University (BA, MS)
- Occupations: Founder and CEO of Architect Financial Technologies, finance executive, software engineer
- Years active: 2010–present
- Spouse: Hannah Clancy (m. 2017)
- Children: 2

Brett Harrison (born May 11, 1988) is an American businessman and software developer. He is the founder and CEO of multinational derivatives exchange group Architect Financial Technologies.

== Early life and education ==
Harrison was born in New York City and raised in Dix Hills, New York. He graduated from Half Hollow Hills High School West in 2006. While in high school, he attended the Research Science Institute at MIT and published mathematics research in American Mathematical Monthly.

He attended Harvard University, where he earned an M.S. and B.A. in computer science. His studies focused on artificial intelligence. He completed Math 55 during his time at Harvard.

== Career ==
Harrison joined Jane Street Capital as an American depositary receipt trader in 2010. He later went on to lead Jane Street’s algorithmic trading system development groups. While at Jane Street, he met and worked with Sam Bankman-Fried.

He was subsequently a technology executive at Citadel Securities. At Citadel he managed the company’s Options, ETF, ADR and OTC technology departments.

In May 2021, Harrison became President of FTX US. While at FTX US he established the company’s regulated business operations and opened its headquarters in Chicago. In 2022 he oversaw the launch of the company’s US retail stock brokerage and trading platform.

Harrison announced his resignation from FTX US on September 27, 2022, after protracted disagreements with Bankman-Fried over formal management structure and lack of delegation of authority at the company.

In December 2022, Bloomberg reported that Harrison was raising capital for a new trading technology venture. In January 2023, he closed a $5 million seed round and founded Architect Financial Technologies, a company to develop institutional-grade trading infrastructure, with investment from Coinbase and Circle. The company became a CFTC-regulated derivatives broker in September 2023, and an SEC-regulated broker-dealer in October 2024. In 2025 the company began operating a perpetual futures exchange in Bermuda and was valued at $187 million. In 2026 the company acquired a US futures exchange.

== Personal life ==
Harrison is Jewish. He owns numerous rescue dogs and cats.

He is married to Hannah Harrison. They have two internationally adopted children. He lives in Winnetka, Illinois.
