= Nathan Staios =

American ice hockey player

- Born: May 16, 2001 (age 25) Atlanta, Georgia, U.S.
- Height: 5 ft 10 in (178 cm)
- Weight: 179 lb (81 kg; 12 st 11 lb)
- Position: Defense
- Shoots: Left
- team Former teams: Free agent Utica Comets; Huddinge IK; Florida Everblades; Newfoundland Growlers; Savannah Ghost Pirates; Vimmerby HC
- NHL draft: Undrafted
- Playing career: 2021–present

Nathan Staios (born May 16, 2001) is a Canadian-American professional ice hockey defenseman who is currently an unrestricted free agent. He was last under contract with the Florida Panthers of the National Hockey League (NHL).

== Playing career ==
Staios was selected 17th overall in the first round of the 2017 OHL Entry Draft by the Windsor Spitfires. He was traded to the Hamilton Bulldogs in exchange for future OHL draft picks prior to the 2019–20 season.

When the OHL shut down during the 2020–21 season due to COVID-19, Staios played nine games for Huddinge IK of HockeyEttan before playing six games for the Utica Comets of the American Hockey League.

For the 2021–22 season playing for Hamilton, Staios led all OHL defencemen in scoring, with 66 points in 50 games. He was named a First Team All-Star and won the Max Kaminsky Trophy as the OHL's best defenceman. He was also named the CHL Defenceman of the Year.

As a sought-after undrafted free agent, Staios was signed to a three-year, entry-level contract with the Florida Panthers on July 13, 2022.

Staios spent the bulk of his NHL contract in the ECHL, winning the Kelly Cup with the Panthers-affiliated Florida Everblades in 2023, and was named an ECHL All-Star in Florida the next year before being reassigned to the Newfoundland Growlers of the ECHL in February 2024. He started the next year with the Panthers' new ECHL affiliate, the Savannah Ghost Pirates, before being reassigned in February 2025 to Vimmerby HC of HockeyAllsvenskan. He was not tendered a qualifying offer by the Panthers upon the end of his deal, making him an unrestricted free agent.

== Personal ==
Staios is the son of former NHL defenceman and current Ottawa Senators President of Hockey Operations Steve Staios. Staios was born in Atlanta, when his father was a member of the Atlanta Thrashers.

== Career statistics ==
=== Regular season and playoffs ===
| | | | Regular season | | | | | Playoffs |
| Season | Team | League | GP | G | A | Pts | PIM | GP | G | A | Pts | PIM |
|---|---|---|---|---|---|---|---|---|---|---|---|---|
| 2016–17 | Oakville Blades | OJHL | 1 | 0 | 0 | 0 | 10 | 2 | 0 | 0 | 0 | 2 |
| 2017–18 | Windsor Spitfires | OHL | 54 | 3 | 9 | 12 | 44 | 3 | 0 | 0 | 0 | 2 |
| 2018–19 | Windsor Spitfires | OHL | 64 | 9 | 20 | 29 | 50 | 4 | 0 | 2 | 2 | 2 |
| 2019–20 | Hamilton Bulldogs | OHL | 60 | 6 | 35 | 41 | 59 | — | — | — | — | — |
| 2020–21 | Huddinge IK | Div.1 | 9 | 0 | 5 | 5 | 6 | — | — | — | — | — |
| 2020–21 | Utica Comets | AHL | 6 | 0 | 0 | 0 | 2 | — | — | — | — | — |
| 2021–22 | Hamilton Bulldogs | OHL | 59 | 15 | 51 | 66 | 76 | 13 | 3 | 6 | 9 | 10 |
| 2022–23 | Florida Everblades | ECHL | 44 | 4 | 14 | 18 | 14 | — | — | — | — | — |
| 2023–24 | Florida Everblades | ECHL | 45 | 9 | 12 | 21 | 24 | — | — | — | — | — |
| 2023–24 | Newfoundland Growlers | ECHL | 10 | 0 | 7 | 7 | 2 | — | — | — | — | — |
| AHL totals | | | 6 | 0 | 0 | 0 | 2 | — | — | — | — | — |

=== International ===
| Year | Team | Event | Result | GP | G | A | Pts | PIM |
|---|---|---|---|---|---|---|---|---|
| 2017 | Canada White | U17 | 4th | 6 | 0 | 4 | 4 | 0 |
| Junior totals | | | | 6 | 0 | 4 | 4 | 0 |

== Awards and honors ==
| Award | Year |
OHL
| First All-Star Team | 2022 |
| Max Kaminsky Trophy | 2022 |
| J. Ross Robertson Cup | 2022 |
| CHL Defenseman of the Year | 2022 |
