= Jan Myšák =

Czech ice hockey player (born 2002)

- Born: 24 June 2002 (age 24) Litvínov, Czech Republic
- Height: 5 ft 11 in (180 cm)
- Weight: 201 lb (91 kg; 14 st 5 lb)
- Position: Centre
- Shoots: Left
- SHL team Former teams: HV71; HC Litvínov
- NHL draft: 48th overall, 2020; Montreal Canadiens
- Playing career: 2018–present

Jan Myšák (born 24 June 2002) is a Czech professional ice hockey centre for HV71 of the Swedish Hockey League (SHL). He was selected in the second round, 48th overall, by the Montreal Canadiens in the 2020 NHL entry draft.

== Playing career ==
Myšák was signed by the Hamilton Bulldogs of the Ontario Hockey League (OHL) on 13 January 2020. Before playing in OHL, Myšák played for HC Litvínov of the Czech Extraliga and its youth teams. In August 2020, with North American competitions delayed due to the COVID-19 pandemic, he was loaned to HC Litvínov. Myšák was selected by the Montreal Canadiens of the National Hockey League (NHL) with the 48th overall pick in the 2020 NHL entry draft. In January 2021, Myšák joined the training camp of affiliate Laval Rocket in the American Hockey League (AHL) after which he recorded two goals in 13 games played.

On 6 April 2021, Myšák signed a three-year, entry-level contract with the Montreal Canadiens. On 1 October 2021, Myšák was cut from Canadiens' training camp and returned to the Bulldogs. After returning to the Bulldogs, he put up 34 goals and 64 points in 61 games, and four goals and seven assists for 11 points in 17 games in the playoffs. The Bulldogs captured the J. Ross Robertson Cup as champions of the OHL playoffs and moved on to the Memorial Cup. They finished second in the tournament, losing in the final game versus host team Saint John Sea Dogs.

For the 2022–23 season, Myšák was assigned to Laval. However, Myšák's scoring touch from junior level failed to translate in his first season in the AHL, where he scored just nine points in 40 games. During the 2023–24 season, Myšák played in 48 games for Laval, scoring 13 goals and 20 points.

On 7 March 2024, Myšák was traded by the Canadiens to the Anaheim Ducks in exchange for forward Jacob Perreault. He was assigned to Anaheim's AHL affiliate, the San Diego Gulls, following the trade. He played in 14 games with the Gulls, scoring just one goal. The Ducks again assigned Myšák to San Diego to begin the 2024–25 season.

On 16 June 2026, Myšák left the Ducks organization as a restricted free agent, signing a two-year contract with Swedish club, HV71 of the SHL.

== Career statistics ==
=== Regular season and playoffs ===
| | | | Regular season | | | | | Playoffs |
| Season | Team | League | GP | G | A | Pts | PIM | GP | G | A | Pts | PIM |
|---|---|---|---|---|---|---|---|---|---|---|---|---|
| 2018–19 | HC Litvínov | ELH | 31 | 3 | 4 | 7 | 2 | — | — | — | — | — |
| 2019–20 | HC Litvínov | ELH | 26 | 5 | 4 | 9 | 2 | — | — | — | — | — |
| 2019–20 | Hamilton Bulldogs | OHL | 22 | 15 | 10 | 25 | 10 | — | — | — | — | — |
| 2020–21 | HC Litvínov | ELH | 11 | 0 | 1 | 1 | 14 | — | — | — | — | — |
| 2020–21 | Laval Rocket | AHL | 22 | 2 | 0 | 2 | 0 | — | — | — | — | — |
| 2021–22 | Hamilton Bulldogs | OHL | 61 | 34 | 30 | 64 | 6 | 17 | 4 | 7 | 11 | 4 |
| 2022–23 | Laval Rocket | AHL | 40 | 5 | 4 | 9 | 8 | — | — | — | — | — |
| 2023–24 | Laval Rocket | AHL | 48 | 13 | 7 | 20 | 20 | — | — | — | — | — |
| 2023–24 | San Diego Gulls | AHL | 14 | 1 | 0 | 1 | 4 | — | — | — | — | — |
| 2024–25 | San Diego Gulls | AHL | 68 | 18 | 24 | 42 | 19 | — | — | — | — | — |
| 2025–26 | San Diego Gulls | AHL | 56 | 10 | 13 | 23 | 31 | 1 | 0 | 0 | 0 | 0 |
| ELH totals | | | 68 | 8 | 9 | 17 | 18 | — | — | — | — | — |

=== International ===
| Year | Team | Event | GP | G | A | Pts | PIM |
|---|---|---|---|---|---|---|---|
| 2018 | Czech Republic | U17 | 5 | 1 | 1 | 2 | 0 |
| 2019 | Czech Republic | U18 | 5 | 0 | 3 | 3 | 0 |
| 2019 | Czech Republic | HG18 | 4 | 2 | 0 | 2 | 0 |
| 2020 | Czech Republic | WJC | 5 | 1 | 1 | 2 | 2 |
| 2021 | Czech Republic | WJC | 5 | 2 | 1 | 3 | 0 |
| 2022 | Czechia | WJC | 7 | 4 | 4 | 8 | 0 |
| Junior totals | | | 31 | 10 | 10 | 20 | 2 |
