= 2025–26 NHL transactions =

The following is a list of all team-to-team transactions that occurred in the National Hockey League for the 2025–26 NHL season. It lists which team each player has been traded to, signed by, or claimed by, and for which player(s) or draft pick(s), if applicable. Players who have retired or that have had their contracts terminated are also listed.

The 2025–26 NHL trade deadline was on March 6, 2026. Players traded or claimed off waivers after that date were not eligible to play in the 2026 Stanley Cup playoffs.

== Retirement ==
Date	Player	Last team	Ref
July 4, 2025	Christian Fischer	Columbus Blue Jackets	
July 7, 2025	Zac Dalpe	Florida Panthers	
July 7, 2025	Tyler Johnson	Boston Bruins	
July 8, 2025	Riley Nash	New York Rangers	
August 12, 2025	Chad Ruhwedel	New York Rangers	
August 25, 2025	Tyson Barrie	Calgary Flames	
September 5, 2025	Derek Ryan	Edmonton Oilers	
September 27, 2025	Marc-André Fleury (Note: After previously announcing that he would retire at the conclusion of the 2024–25 season, Fleury signed a professional tryout agreement with his original team, the Pittsburgh Penguins, and played a single 2025 preseason game on September 27 to end his career.)	Minnesota Wild	
September 30, 2025	Max Pacioretty	Toronto Maple Leafs	
October 1, 2025	Erik Johnson	Colorado Avalanche	
October 16, 2025	Cam Atkinson (Note: On October 8, 2025, the Columbus Blue Jackets announced that Atkinson would sign a one-day contract to retire as a member of the team on October 16, with Atkinson subsequently honored prior to the team's home game that night.)	Tampa Bay Lightning	
December 8, 2025	Craig Smith	Detroit Red Wings	
January 5, 2026	Jack Johnson	Columbus Blue Jackets	
March 19, 2026	Ryan Johansen	Philadelphia Flyers	
April 13, 2026	Jonathan Quick (Note: On April 13, 2026, Quick announced that the Rangers' game that night, their second-to-last of the season, would be the final start of his career. He was subsequently scratched for the Rangers' final game of the year.)	New York Rangers	
April 22, 2026	Trevor Lewis	Los Angeles Kings	
April 26, 2026	Anže Kopitar (Note: Kopitar announced ahead of the 2025–26 season that he would retire at end of the season. The Kings were eliminated from the 2026 Stanley Cup playoffs on April 26, 2026.)	Los Angeles Kings	
June 19, 2026	Jonathan Toews	Winnipeg Jets	

== Contract terminations ==
A team and player may mutually agree to terminate a player's contract at any time. All players must clear waivers before having a contract terminated.

Buyouts can only occur at specific times of the year. For more details on contract terminations as buyouts:

Teams may buy out player contracts (after the conclusion of a season) for a portion of the remaining value of the contract, paid over a period of twice the remaining length of the contract. This reduced number and extended period is applied to the cap hit as well.

- If the player was under the age of 26 at the time of the buyout the player's pay and cap hit will reduced by a factor of 2/3 over the extended period.
- If the player was 26 or older at the time of the buyout the player's pay and cap hit will reduced by a factor of 1/3 over the extended period.
- If the player was 35 or older at the time of signing the contract the player's pay will be reduced by a factor of 1/3, but the cap hit will not be reduced over the extended period.

Injured players cannot be bought out.

Date	Player	Previous team	Notes	Ref
June 27, 2025	Marc-Édouard Vlasic	San Jose Sharks	Buyout	
June 30, 2025	Joe Veleno	Seattle Kraken	Buyout	
June 30, 2025	Conor Sheary	Tampa Bay Lightning	Mutual termination	
July 16, 2025	Joni Jurmo	Calgary Flames	Mutual termination	
July 16, 2025	Ty Voit	Toronto Maple Leafs	Mutual termination	
September 3, 2025	Rodwin Dionicio	Anaheim Ducks	Mutual termination	
October 2, 2025	Christián Jaroš	Columbus Blue Jackets	Mutual termination	
October 24, 2025	Sheldon Rempal	Washington Capitals	Mutual termination	
November 5, 2025	Vitali Kravtsov	Vancouver Canucks	Mutual termination	
November 14, 2025	David Kämpf	Toronto Maple Leafs	Mutual termination	
November 23, 2025	Alexandre Texier	St. Louis Blues	Mutual termination	
November 24, 2025	Alexandar Georgiev	Buffalo Sabres	Mutual termination	
December 3, 2025	Niko Huuhtanen	Tampa Bay Lightning	Mutual termination	
December 6, 2025	Anton Lundmark	Florida Panthers	Mutual termination	
December 29, 2025	David Tomášek	Edmonton Oilers	Mutual termination	
January 6, 2026	Egor Zamula	Pittsburgh Penguins	Termination	
February 4, 2026	Ryan McAllister	Florida Panthers	Mutual termination	
February 4, 2026	Filip Larsson	Pittsburgh Penguins	Mutual termination	
February 4, 2026	Samuel Johannesson	St. Louis Blues	Mutual termination	
February 6, 2026	Josh Davies	Florida Panthers	Mutual termination	
February 6, 2026	Juho Lammikko	New Jersey Devils	Mutual termination	
February 17, 2026	Jeff Skinner	San Jose Sharks	Mutual termination	
March 6, 2026	Mathieu Joseph	St. Louis Blues	Mutual termination	
April 17, 2026	Matt Dumba	Pittsburgh Penguins	Mutual termination	
May 8, 2026	Alex Formenton (Note: Formenton was a restricted free agent for Ottawa at the time of the termination, and was not under contract.)	Ottawa Senators	Termination	

== Free agency ==
Note: This does not include players who have re-signed with their previous team as an unrestricted free agent or as a restricted free agent.

Date	Player	New team	Previous team	Ref
July 1, 2025	Jonathan Toews (Note: Winnipeg agreed to terms with Toews on June 20, 2025 though the contract could not be registered until July 1, per CBA 50.8(d).)	Winnipeg Jets	Chicago Blackhawks	
July 1, 2025	Noah Juulsen	Philadelphia Flyers	Vancouver Canucks	
July 1, 2025	Christian Dvorak	Philadelphia Flyers	Montreal Canadiens	
July 1, 2025	Matěj Blümel	Boston Bruins	Dallas Stars	
July 1, 2025	Corey Perry	Los Angeles Kings	Edmonton Oilers	
July 1, 2025	Daniel Vladař	Philadelphia Flyers	Calgary Flames	
July 1, 2025	Lane Pederson	Philadelphia Flyers	Edmonton Oilers	
July 1, 2025	Vladislav Gavrikov	New York Rangers	Los Angeles Kings	
July 1, 2025	Joel Armia	Los Angeles Kings	Montreal Canadiens	
July 1, 2025	Connor Brown	New Jersey Devils	Edmonton Oilers	
July 1, 2025	Michael Pezzetta	Toronto Maple Leafs	Montreal Canadiens	
July 1, 2025	Tanner Jeannot	Boston Bruins	Los Angeles Kings	
July 1, 2025	Dennis Gilbert	Philadelphia Flyers	Ottawa Senators	
July 1, 2025	Ryan Lindgren	Seattle Kraken	Colorado Avalanche	
July 1, 2025	Kaapo Kähkönen	Montreal Canadiens	Florida Panthers	
July 1, 2025	Nick Bjugstad	St. Louis Blues	Utah Mammoth	
July 1, 2025	David Rittich	New York Islanders	Los Angeles Kings	
July 1, 2025	Parker Wotherspoon	Pittsburgh Penguins	Boston Bruins	
July 1, 2025	Ethan Bear	New York Islanders	Washington Capitals	
July 1, 2025	Scott Perunovich	Utah Mammoth	New York Islanders	
July 1, 2025	Jordan Harris	Boston Bruins	Columbus Blue Jackets	
July 1, 2025	Brandon Tanev	Utah Mammoth	Winnipeg Jets	
July 1, 2025	Olle Lycksell	Ottawa Senators	Philadelphia Flyers	
July 1, 2025	Dylan Coghlan	Vegas Golden Knights	Winnipeg Jets	
July 1, 2025	Ian Mitchell	Detroit Red Wings	Boston Bruins	
July 1, 2025	Mason Geertsen	Buffalo Sabres	Vegas Golden Knights	
July 1, 2025	Jacob Bernard-Docker	Detroit Red Wings	Buffalo Sabres	
July 1, 2025	Sean Kuraly	Boston Bruins	Columbus Blue Jackets	
July 1, 2025	James van Riemsdyk	Detroit Red Wings	Columbus Blue Jackets	
July 1, 2025	Alex Belzile	Montreal Canadiens	New York Rangers	
July 1, 2025	Nathan Clurman	Montreal Canadiens	Pittsburgh Penguins	
July 1, 2025	Nate Schmidt	Utah Mammoth	Florida Panthers	
July 1, 2025	Mikey Eyssimont	Boston Bruins	Seattle Kraken	
July 1, 2025	Jeff Petry	Florida Panthers	Detroit Red Wings	
July 1, 2025	Alex Steeves	Boston Bruins	Toronto Maple Leafs	
July 1, 2025	Cody Ceci	Los Angeles Kings	Dallas Stars	
July 1, 2025	Brian Dumoulin	Los Angeles Kings	New Jersey Devils	
July 1, 2025	Anton Forsberg	Los Angeles Kings	Ottawa Senators	
July 1, 2025	Nick Perbix	Nashville Predators	Tampa Bay Lightning	
July 1, 2025	Jonathan Drouin	New York Islanders	Colorado Avalanche	
July 1, 2025	Radek Faksa	Dallas Stars	St. Louis Blues	
July 1, 2025	Jack Studnicka	Florida Panthers	Los Angeles Kings	
July 1, 2025	Ronnie Attard	Colorado Avalanche	Edmonton Oilers	
July 1, 2025	Cole Koepke	Winnipeg Jets	Boston Bruins	
July 1, 2025	Tanner Pearson	Winnipeg Jets	Vegas Golden Knights	
July 1, 2025	Nick Abruzzese	Tampa Bay Lightning	Toronto Maple Leafs	
July 1, 2025	Brandon Bussi	Florida Panthers	Boston Bruins	
July 1, 2025	Matt Murray	Seattle Kraken	Toronto Maple Leafs	
July 1, 2025	Alex Lyon	Buffalo Sabres	Detroit Red Wings	
July 1, 2025	Matthew Highmore	New York Islanders	Ottawa Senators	
July 1, 2025	Justin Dowling	New York Rangers	New Jersey Devils	
July 1, 2025	John Klingberg	San Jose Sharks	Edmonton Oilers	
July 1, 2025	Philipp Kurashev	San Jose Sharks	Chicago Blackhawks	
July 1, 2025	Nolan Foote	Florida Panthers	New Jersey Devils	
July 1, 2025	Simon Lundmark	Tampa Bay Lightning	Winnipeg Jets	
July 1, 2025	Nico Sturm	Minnesota Wild	Florida Panthers	
July 1, 2025	Justin Danforth	Buffalo Sabres	Columbus Blue Jackets	
July 1, 2025	Pontus Holmberg	Tampa Bay Lightning	Toronto Maple Leafs	
July 1, 2025	Lars Eller	Ottawa Senators	Washington Capitals	
July 1, 2025	Mikael Granlund	Anaheim Ducks	Dallas Stars	
July 1, 2025	Adam Gaudette	San Jose Sharks	Ottawa Senators	
July 1, 2025	Vítek Vaněček	Utah Mammoth	Florida Panthers	
July 1, 2025	Travis Boyd	Toronto Maple Leafs	Minnesota Wild	
July 1, 2025	Bo Groulx	Toronto Maple Leafs	New York Rangers	
July 1, 2025	Dominic Toninato	Chicago Blackhawks	Winnipeg Jets	
July 1, 2025	Angus Crookshank	New Jersey Devils	Ottawa Senators	
July 1, 2025	Isac Lundeström	Columbus Blue Jackets	Anaheim Ducks	
July 1, 2025	Jaycob Megna	Vegas Golden Knights	Florida Panthers	
July 1, 2025	Evgenii Dadonov	New Jersey Devils	Dallas Stars	
July 1, 2025	Joseph LaBate	Vancouver Canucks	Columbus Blue Jackets	
July 1, 2025	Mackenzie MacEachern	Vancouver Canucks	St. Louis Blues	
July 1, 2025	Jimmy Schuldt	Vancouver Canucks	San Jose Sharks	
July 1, 2025	Cole Reinhardt	Vegas Golden Knights	Ottawa Senators	
July 1, 2025	Mike Reilly	Carolina Hurricanes	New York Islanders	
July 1, 2025	Jonathan Aspirot	Boston Bruins	Calgary Flames	
July 1, 2025	Cole McWard	New York Islanders	Vancouver Canucks	
July 1, 2025	Justin Brazeau	Pittsburgh Penguins	Minnesota Wild	
July 1, 2025	Riley Stillman	Edmonton Oilers	Carolina Hurricanes	
July 1, 2025	Matt Tomkins	Edmonton Oilers	Tampa Bay Lightning	
July 1, 2025	Caleb Jones	Pittsburgh Penguins	Los Angeles Kings	
July 1, 2025	Derrick Pouliot	New York Rangers	Tampa Bay Lightning	
July 1, 2025	Cole Clayton	San Jose Sharks	Columbus Blue Jackets	
July 1, 2025	Jimmy Huntington	San Jose Sharks	Pittsburgh Penguins	
July 1, 2025	Samuel Laberge	San Jose Sharks	New Jersey Devils	
July 1, 2025	Taylor Raddysh	New York Rangers	Washington Capitals	
July 1, 2025	Kale Clague	Winnipeg Jets	Buffalo Sabres	
July 1, 2025	Ben Gleason	Minnesota Wild	Philadelphia Flyers	
July 1, 2025	Phillip Di Giuseppe	Winnipeg Jets	Vancouver Canucks	
July 1, 2025	Carson Meyer	Buffalo Sabres	Anaheim Ducks	
July 1, 2025	Vinni Lettieri	Toronto Maple Leafs	Boston Bruins	
July 1, 2025	Tyler Pitlick	Minnesota Wild	Boston Bruins	
July 1, 2025	Zac Jones	Buffalo Sabres	New York Rangers	
July 1, 2025	Andrew Mangiapane	Edmonton Oilers	Washington Capitals	
July 2, 2025	Jakob Pelletier	Tampa Bay Lightning	Philadelphia Flyers	
July 2, 2025	Cole Guttman	Los Angeles Kings	Chicago Blackhawks	
July 2, 2025	Anthony Mantha	Pittsburgh Penguins	Calgary Flames	
July 2, 2025	Arthur Kaliyev	Ottawa Senators	New York Rangers	
July 2, 2025	Nicolas Aubé-Kubel	Minnesota Wild	New York Rangers	
July 2, 2025	Matt Kiersted	Minnesota Wild	Florida Panthers	
July 2, 2025	Cal Petersen	Minnesota Wild	Philadelphia Flyers	
July 2, 2025	Rafaël Harvey-Pinard	Pittsburgh Penguins	Montreal Canadiens	
July 2, 2025	Philip Kemp	Pittsburgh Penguins	Edmonton Oilers	
July 2, 2025	Louie Belpedio	Washington Capitals	Philadelphia Flyers	
July 2, 2025	Graeme Clarke	Washington Capitals	Minnesota Wild	
July 2, 2025	Calle Rosén	Washington Capitals	Colorado Avalanche	
July 2, 2025	Curtis Lazar	Edmonton Oilers	New Jersey Devils	
July 2, 2025	Walker Duehr	Winnipeg Jets	San Jose Sharks	
July 2, 2025	Samuel Fagemo	Winnipeg Jets	Los Angeles Kings	
July 2, 2025	Isaac Poulter	Winnipeg Jets	New Jersey Devils	
July 2, 2025	Samuel Bolduc	Los Angeles Kings	New York Islanders	
July 2, 2025	Marc Del Gaizo	Montreal Canadiens	Nashville Predators	
July 2, 2025	Hunter Shepard	Ottawa Senators	Washington Capitals	
July 2, 2025	Logan Brown	Los Angeles Kings	Tampa Bay Lightning	
July 2, 2025	Alexander Alexeyev	Pittsburgh Penguins	Washington Capitals	
July 2, 2025	P.O Joseph	Vancouver Canucks	Pittsburgh Penguins	
July 2, 2025	Mason Appleton	Detroit Red Wings	Winnipeg Jets	
July 2, 2025	Pius Suter	St. Louis Blues	Vancouver Canucks	
July 2, 2025	Gustav Nyquist	Winnipeg Jets	Minnesota Wild	
July 2, 2025	Brent Burns	Colorado Avalanche	Carolina Hurricanes	
July 3, 2025	Trey Fix-Wolansky	New York Rangers	Columbus Blue Jackets	
July 3, 2025	Dmitry Orlov	San Jose Sharks	Carolina Hurricanes	
July 3, 2025	Nikolaj Ehlers	Carolina Hurricanes	Winnipeg Jets	
July 4, 2025	Alex Barré-Boulet	Colorado Avalanche	Montreal Canadiens	
July 10, 2025	Jakub Škarek	San Jose Sharks	New York Islanders	
July 11, 2025	Jeff Skinner	San Jose Sharks	Edmonton Oilers	
July 13, 2025	Scott Sabourin	Tampa Bay Lightning	San Jose Sharks	
July 16, 2025	Joe Veleno	Montreal Canadiens	Seattle Kraken	
July 16, 2025	Jake Leschyshyn	Buffalo Sabres	New York Rangers	
July 16, 2025	Dysin Mayo	Columbus Blue Jackets	Vegas Golden Knights	
August 9, 2025	Nathan Bastian	Dallas Stars	New Jersey Devils	
August 15, 2025	Travis Hamonic	Detroit Red Wings	Ottawa Senators	
August 18, 2025	Hudson Fasching	Columbus Blue Jackets	New York Islanders	
August 18, 2025	Alex Gagne	Colorado Avalanche	Tampa Bay Lightning	
August 20, 2025	Victor Olofsson	Colorado Avalanche	Vegas Golden Knights	
August 22, 2025	Luke Kunin	Florida Panthers	Columbus Blue Jackets	
August 25, 2025	Cameron Crotty	Ottawa Senators	Minnesota Wild	
September 11, 2025	Alexandar Georgiev	Buffalo Sabres	San Jose Sharks	
September 20, 2025	Dominic James	Tampa Bay Lightning	Chicago Blackhawks	
October 3, 2025	Givani Smith	Carolina Hurricanes	Philadelphia Flyers	
October 5, 2025	Matt Grzelcyk	Chicago Blackhawks	Pittsburgh Penguins	
October 5, 2025	Jérémy Davies (Note: Davies' contract was announced on July 2, 2025, but not formally signed until October 5 for salary cap reasons; in the interim period, Davies joined the team on an AHL contract.)	Vegas Golden Knights	Ottawa Senators	
October 6, 2025	Conor Sheary	New York Rangers	Tampa Bay Lightning	
October 6, 2025	Kevin Rooney	Utah Mammoth	Calgary Flames	
October 7, 2025	Noah Gregor	Florida Panthers	San Jose Sharks	
October 7, 2025	Adam Erne	Dallas Stars	Edmonton Oilers	
October 7, 2025	Luke Glendening	New Jersey Devils	Tampa Bay Lightning	
October 8, 2025	Georgi Romanov	St. Louis Blues	San Jose Sharks	
October 8, 2025	Jack Roslovic	Edmonton Oilers	Carolina Hurricanes	
October 25, 2025	Carter Hart	Vegas Golden Knights	Philadelphia Flyers	
October 27, 2025	Brett Leason	Washington Capitals	Anaheim Ducks	
November 16, 2025	David Kämpf	Vancouver Canucks	Toronto Maple Leafs	
November 23, 2025	Alexandre Texier	Montreal Canadiens	St. Louis Blues	
November 24, 2025	Brendan Smith	Columbus Blue Jackets	Dallas Stars	
December 10, 2025	Robby Fabbri	St. Louis Blues	Anaheim Ducks	
January 6, 2026	Egor Zamula	Columbus Blue Jackets	Pittsburgh Penguins	
January 12, 2026	James Reimer	Ottawa Senators	Buffalo Sabres	
March 6, 2026	Mathieu Joseph	Los Angeles Kings	St. Louis Blues	

=== Imports ===
This section is for players who were not previously on contract with NHL teams in the past season. Listed is the last team and league they were under contract with.

Date	Player	New team	Previous team	League	Ref
July 1, 2025	Ryan Fanti (Note: Tampa Bay agreed to terms with Fanti on June 3, 2025 though the contract could not be registered until July 1, per CBA 50.8(d).)	Tampa Bay Lightning	Syracuse Crunch	AHL	
July 1, 2025	Michal Postava (Note: Detroit agreed to terms with Postava on June 10, 2025 though the contract could not be registered until July 1, per CBA 50.8(d).)	Detroit Red Wings	HC Kometa Brno	ELH	
July 1, 2025	Juho Lammikko (Note: New Jersey agreed to terms with Lammikko on June 15, 2025 though the contract could not be registered until July 1, per CBA 50.8(d).)	New Jersey Devils	ZSC Lions	NL	
July 1, 2025	Matt Luff	St. Louis Blues	Springfield Thunderbirds	AHL	
July 1, 2025	Amir Miftakhov	Carolina Hurricanes	Ak Bars Kazan	KHL	
July 1, 2025	Tristan Allard	Tampa Bay Lightning	Syracuse Crunch	AHL	
July 1, 2025	Sammy Blais	Montreal Canadiens	Abbotsford Canucks	AHL	
July 1, 2025	Christián Jaroš	Columbus Blue Jackets	HC CSKA Moscow	KHL	
July 1, 2025	John Leonard	Detroit Red Wings	Charlotte Checkers	AHL	
July 1, 2025	Nick Cicek	Calgary Flames	Adler Mannheim	DEL	
July 1, 2025	Boris Katchouk	Tampa Bay Lightning	Wilkes-Barre/Scranton Penguins	AHL	
July 1, 2025	Calen Addison	New Jersey Devils	Springfield Thunderbirds	AHL	
July 1, 2025	Luke Cavallin	Boston Bruins	Laval Rocket	AHL	
July 1, 2025	Riley Fiddler-Schultz	Buffalo Sabres	Rochester Americans	AHL	
July 1, 2025	Zach Metsa	Buffalo Sabres	Rochester Americans	AHL	
July 1, 2025	Ivan Prosvetov	Calgary Flames	HC CSKA Moscow	KHL	
July 2, 2025	Bradley Marek	Minnesota Wild	Iowa Wild	AHL	
July 2, 2025	Jackson Parsons	Ottawa Senators	Kitchener Rangers	OHL	
July 2, 2025	Maxim Shabanov	New York Islanders	Traktor Chelyabinsk	KHL	
July 7, 2025	Sheldon Rempal	Washington Capitals	Salavat Yulaev Ufa	KHL	
July 11, 2025	Gavin Bayreuther	Carolina Hurricanes	Lausanne HC	NL	
July 16, 2025	Stanislav Berezhnoy	Chicago Blackhawks	HC Dynamo Moscow	KHL	
September 23, 2025	Jaxon Fuder	Dallas Stars	Red Deer Rebels	WHL	
October 27, 2025	Tristen Nielsen	Colorado Avalanche	Colorado Eagles	AHL	
November 12, 2025	Spencer Martin	New York Rangers	HC CSKA Moscow	KHL	
December 10, 2025	Trevor Kuntar	Buffalo Sabres	Rochester Americans	AHL	
February 17, 2026	Mitchell Gibson	Washington Capitals	Hershey Bears	AHL	
February 21, 2026	Olivier Rodrigue	Chicago Blackhawks	Barys Astana	KHL	
March 1, 2026	Ryden Evers	Seattle Kraken	Penticton Vees	WHL	
March 2, 2026	Gustav Olofsson	Seattle Kraken	Coachella Valley Firebirds	AHL	
March 4, 2026	Louis Domingue	Florida Panthers	Charlotte Checkers	AHL	
March 5, 2026	Garrett Wilson	Philadelphia Flyers	Lehigh Valley Phantoms	AHL	
March 6, 2026	Taylor Gauthier	Pittsburgh Penguins	Wilkes-Barre/Scranton Penguins	AHL	
March 12, 2026	Tyson Gross	Calgary Flames	St. Cloud State Huskies	NCHC	
March 13, 2026	Gustav Stjernberg	Colorado Avalanche	Bowling Green Falcons	CCHA	
March 14, 2026	Bronson Ride	Vegas Golden Knights	North Bay Battalion	OHL	
March 17, 2026	Vinny Borgesi	Toronto Maple Leafs	Northeastern Huskies	HE	
March 18, 2026	Jack Anderson	Dallas Stars	Michigan Tech Huskies	CCHA	
March 18, 2026	Brandon Buhr	Toronto Maple Leafs	Union Garnet Chargers	ECAC	
March 20, 2026	Dylan Hryckowian	Dallas Stars	Northeastern Huskies	HE	
March 22, 2026	Riley Thompson	Philadelphia Flyers	Ohio State Buckeyes	B1G	
March 23, 2026	Félix Trudeau	St. Louis Blues	Sacred Heart Pioneers	AHA	
March 24, 2026	Josh Kotai	New York Islanders	Augustana Vikings	CCHA	
March 25, 2026	Lucas Wahlin	Winnipeg Jets	St. Thomas Tommies	CCHA	
March 27, 2026	Hayes Hundley	Toronto Maple Leafs	St. Thomas Tommies	CCHA	
March 27, 2026	Tomáš Cibulka	Edmonton Oilers	Motor Ceske Budejovice	ELH	
March 29, 2026	Max Lundgren	Boston Bruins	Merrimack Warriors	HE	
March 30, 2026	Matthew DiMarsico	Colorado Avalanche	Penn State Nittany Lions	B1G	
April 2, 2026	Owen Michaels	Edmonton Oilers	Western Michigan Broncos	NCHC	
April 2, 2026	Grant Slukynsky	Los Angeles Kings	Western Michigan Broncos	NCHC	
April 9, 2026	Viking Gustafsson Nyberg	Minnesota Wild	UConn Huskies	HE	
April 10, 2026	Jake Livanavage	Pittsburgh Penguins	North Dakota Fighting Hawks	NCHC	
April 11, 2026	T.J. Hughes	Colorado Avalanche	Michigan Wolverines	B1G	
April 12, 2026	Josh Eernisse	Columbus Blue Jackets	Michigan Wolverines	B1G	
April 13, 2026	Christian Fitzgerald	Dallas Stars	Wisconsin Badgers	B1G	
April 13, 2026	Boston Buckberger	Columbus Blue Jackets	Denver Pioneers	NCHC	
April 14, 2026	Landon Sim	Toronto Maple Leafs	Toronto Marlies	AHL	
April 15, 2026	Ben Dexheimer	Minnesota Wild	Wisconsin Badgers	B1G	
April 27, 2026	Vitali Pinchuk	Nashville Predators	HC Dinamo Minsk	KHL	
May 7, 2026	Theodor Niederbach	Washington Capitals	Frolunda HC	SHL	
May 25, 2026	Aku Räty	Edmonton Oilers	Oulun Karpat	Liiga	
May 28, 2026	Phillip Sinn	San Jose Sharks	EHC Red Bull Munchen	DEL	
June 1, 2026	Nikita Novosyolov	Colorado Avalanche	Gornyak-UGMK	VHL	

== Trades ==
* Retained Salary Transaction—Each team is allowed up to three contracts on their payroll where they have retained salary in a trade (i.e. the player no longer plays with Team A due to a trade to Team B, but Team A still retains some salary). Only up to 50% of a player's contract can be kept, and only up to 15% of a team's salary cap can be taken up by retained salary. A contract can only be involved in one of these trades twice, and there must be a minimum of 75 days between the two trades.

=== June ===
June 27, 2025	To Colorado Avalanche Gavin Brindley; 3rd-round pick in 2025 conditional (Note: Colorado will Columbus' choice of Minnesota's second-round pick in 2027 or their own second-round pick in 2027.) CBJ 2nd-round pick in 2027 or MIN 2nd-round pick in 2027	To Columbus Blue Jackets Charlie Coyle; Miles Wood
June 27, 2025	To Montreal Canadiens Noah Dobson	To New York Islanders Emil Heineman; 1st-round pick in 2025; CGY 1st-round pick in 2025
June 28, 2025	To Los Angeles Kings NSH 3rd-round pick in 2025; COL 6th-round pick in 2026	To Ottawa Senators Jordan Spence
June 28, 2025	To Buffalo Sabres Isaac Belliveau; Conor Timmins	To Pittsburgh Penguins Connor Clifton; 2nd-round pick in 2025
June 28, 2025	To Anaheim Ducks Petr Mrázek; 4th-round pick in 2026; 2nd-round pick in 2027	To Detroit Red Wings John Gibson
June 28, 2025	To Minnesota Wild Chase Priskie; 4th-round pick in 2025	To Washington Capitals Declan Chisholm; 6th-round pick in 2025
June 28, 2025	To Chicago Blackhawks future considerations (Note: Considerations unknown.)	To Vancouver Canucks Ilya Safonov
June 30, 2025	To Nashville Predators Nicolas Hague conditional (Note: Nashville will receive Vegas' second-round pick in 2027 if Vegas wins at least two rounds of the 2026 Stanley Cup Playoffs; otherwise, Nashville will receive Vegas' third-round pick in 2027.) 2nd-round pick in 2027 or 3rd-round pick in 2027	To Vegas Golden Knights Jérémy Lauzon; Colton Sissons* (Note: Nashville retained 50% of Sissons' contract.)
June 30, 2025	To Detroit Red Wings future considerations (Note: Considerations unknown.)	To Minnesota Wild Vladimir Tarasenko
June 30, 2025	To Toronto Maple Leafs Matias Maccelli	To Utah Mammoth conditional (Note: Utah will receive Toronto's second-round pick in 2029 if Toronto makes the 2026 Stanley Cup playoffs and Maccelli records at least 51 points in the 2025–26 season; otherwise, Utah will receive Toronto's third-round pick in 2027.) 2nd-round pick in 2029 or 3rd-round pick in 2027
June 30, 2025	To Carolina Hurricanes Cayden Primeau	To Montreal Canadiens 7th-round pick in 2026

==== Pick-only trades ====
June 27, 2025	To Philadelphia Flyers NYR 1st-round pick in 2025 (#12 overall)	To Pittsburgh Penguins COL 1st-round pick in 2025 (#22 overall); EDM 1st-round pick in 2025 (#31 overall)
June 27, 2025	To Nashville Predators 1st-round pick in 2025 (#21 overall)	To Ottawa Senators TBL 1st-round pick in 2025 (#23 overall); 3rd-round pick in 2025 (#67 overall)
June 27, 2025	To Los Angeles Kings EDM 1st-round pick in 2025 (#31 overall); WSH 2nd-round pick in 2025 (#59 overall)	To Pittsburgh Penguins 1st-round pick in 2025 (#24 overall)
June 27, 2025	To Carolina Hurricanes 2nd-round pick in 2025 (#34 overall); DAL 2nd-round pick in 2025 (#62 overall); 5th-round pick in 2027	To Chicago Blackhawks 1st-round pick in 2025 (#29 overall)
June 28, 2025	To Carolina Hurricanes PIT 2nd-round pick in 2025 (#41 overall); 2nd-round pick in 2025 (#49 overall)	To Montreal Canadiens CHI 2nd-round pick in 2025 (#34 overall); 6th-round pick in 2025 (#189 overall)
June 28, 2025	To Philadelphia Flyers 2nd-round pick in 2025 (#38 overall); TOR 2nd-round pick in 2025 (#57 overall)	To Seattle Kraken 2nd-round pick in 2025 (#36 overall); 3rd-round pick in 2025 (#68 overall)
June 28, 2025	To Nashville Predators 2nd-round pick in 2025 (#58 overall); 4th-round pick in 2025 (#122 overall)	To Vegas Golden Knights TBL 2nd-round pick in 2025 (#55 overall)
June 28, 2025	To Carolina Hurricanes NSH 3rd-round pick in 2025 (#67 overall)	To Los Angeles Kings 4th-round pick in 2025 (#125 overall); DAL 3rd-round pick in 2026
June 28, 2025	To Boston Bruins VAN 3rd-round pick in 2025 (#79 overall); DET 4th-round pick in 2025 (#108 overall)	To Montreal Canadiens 3rd-round pick in 2025 (#69 overall)
June 28, 2025	To Columbus Blue Jackets 3rd-round pick in 2025 (#76 overall)	To Detroit Red Wings 4th-round pick in 2025 (#109 overall); 4th-round pick in 2026
June 28, 2025	To Pittsburgh Penguins WSH 3rd-round pick in 2025 (#91 overall); 5th-round pick in 2025 (#154 overall)	To Vegas Golden Knights OTT 3rd-round pick in 2025 (#85 overall)
June 28, 2025	To Ottawa Senators CAR 3rd-round pick in 2025 (#93 overall)	To Washington Capitals FLA 3rd-round pick in 2025 (#96 overall); 7th-round pick in 2027
June 28, 2025	To Boston Bruins 4th-round pick in 2026	To Tampa Bay Lightning DET 4th-round pick in 2025 (#108 overall)
June 28, 2025	To Edmonton Oilers 5th-round pick in 2025 (#131 overall)	To Nashville Predators 5th-round pick in 2026
June 28, 2025	To Nashville Predators 6th-round pick in 2026	To Utah Mammoth COL 6th-round pick in 2025 (#182 overall)
June 28, 2025	To Chicago Blackhawks 7th-round pick in 2026	To Florida Panthers BOS 7th-round pick in 2025 (#197 overall)
June 28, 2025	To Columbus Blue Jackets 7th-round pick in 2025 (#198 overall)	To Seattle Kraken 7th-round pick in 2025 (#205 overall); VGK 7th-round pick in 2025 (#218 overall)
June 28, 2025	To Calgary Flames STL 7th-round pick in 2025 (#211 overall)	To Detroit Red Wings 7th-round pick in 2026

=== July ===
July 1, 2025	To Toronto Maple Leafs Nicolas Roy	To Vegas Golden Knights Mitch Marner
July 1, 2025	To Boston Bruins Viktor Arvidsson	To Edmonton Oilers 5th-round pick in 2027
July 1, 2025	To Montreal Canadiens Zack Bolduc	To St. Louis Blues Logan Mailloux
July 1, 2025	To Buffalo Sabres 6th-round pick in 2026	To Chicago Blackhawks Sam Lafferty
July 1, 2025	To Pittsburgh Penguins 3rd-round pick in 2028	To San Jose Sharks Alex Nedeljkovic
July 1, 2025	To Carolina Hurricanes K'Andre Miller	To New York Rangers Scott Morrow conditional (Note: New York will receive the higher of Carolina or Dallas' first-round pick in 2026 if both picks are outside of the top 10; otherwise, New York will receive the better of Carolina or Dallas' first-round pick in 2027.) 1st-round pick in 2026 or 1st-round pick in 2027; 2nd-round pick in 2026
July 2, 2025	To New Jersey Devils Thomas Bordeleau	To San Jose Sharks Shane Bowers
July 8, 2025	To Edmonton Oilers Isaac Howard	To Tampa Bay Lightning Sam O'Reilly
July 10, 2025	To Dallas Stars Vladislav Kolyachonok	To Pittsburgh Penguins Matt Dumba; 2nd-round pick in 2028
July 10, 2025	To San Jose Sharks Ryan Reaves	To Toronto Maple Leafs Henry Thrun
July 13, 2025	To Pittsburgh Penguins Artūrs Šilovs	To Vancouver Canucks Chase Stillman; 4th-round pick in 2027
July 17, 2025	To Toronto Maple Leafs Dakota Joshua	To Vancouver Canucks 4th-round pick in 2028
July 25, 2025	To Colorado Avalanche Danil Gushchin	To San Jose Sharks Oskar Olausson

=== September ===
September 4, 2025	To Philadelphia Flyers Tucker Robertson	To Seattle Kraken J.R. Avon
September 5, 2025	To Montreal Canadiens Gannon Laroque	To San Jose Sharks Carey Price; 5th-round pick in 2026
September 14, 2025	To Columbus Blue Jackets Ivan Fedotov	To Philadelphia Flyers 6th-round pick in 2026

=== October ===
October 1, 2025	To Edmonton Oilers Connor Ingram* (Note: Utah retained 41.03% of Ingram's contract.)	To Utah Mammoth future considerations (Note: Considerations unknown.)
October 3, 2025	To New Jersey Devils Zack MacEwen	To Ottawa Senators Kurtis MacDermid
October 5, 2025	To Philadelphia Flyers Carl Grundström; Artem Guryev	To San Jose Sharks Ryan Ellis conditional (Note: San Jose will receive the earlier of Columbus or Philadelphia's sixth-round picks in 2026.) CBJ 6th-round pick in 2026 or PHI 6th-round pick in 2026
October 15, 2025	To Los Angeles Kings Pheonix Copley	To Tampa Bay Lightning future considerations (Note: Considerations unknown.)
October 17, 2025	To Minnesota Wild Oskar Olausson	To San Jose Sharks Kyle Masters
October 24, 2025	To Chicago Blackhawks CHI 4th-round pick in 2027	To Vancouver Canucks Lukas Reichel
October 30, 2025	To Dallas Stars Samu Tuomaala	To Philadelphia Flyers Christian Kyrou

=== November ===
November 3, 2025	To St. Louis Blues Calle Rosén	To Washington Capitals Corey Schueneman
November 17, 2025	To Ottawa Senators Dennis Gilbert	To Philadelphia Flyers Maxence Guénette

=== December ===
December 2, 2025	To Los Angeles Kings Nikita Alexandrov	To St. Louis Blues Akil Thomas
December 8, 2025	To Philadelphia Flyers Roman Schmidt	To Tampa Bay Lightning Ethan Samson
December 12, 2025	To Edmonton Oilers Spencer Stastney	To Nashville Predators 3rd-round pick in 2027
December 12, 2025	To Edmonton Oilers Tristan Jarry; Samuel Poulin	To Pittsburgh Penguins Brett Kulak; Stuart Skinner; 2nd-round pick in 2029
December 12, 2025	To Minnesota Wild Quinn Hughes	To Vancouver Canucks Zeev Buium; Liam Öhgren; Marco Rossi; 1st-round pick in 2026
December 19, 2025	To Los Angeles Kings CBJ 2nd-round pick in 2026	To Montreal Canadiens Phillip Danault
December 19, 2025	To Columbus Blue Jackets Mason Marchment	To Seattle Kraken NYR 4th-round pick in 2026; 2nd-round pick in 2027
December 28, 2025	To Minnesota Wild Boris Katchouk	To Tampa Bay Lightning Michael Milne
December 29, 2025	To Columbus Blue Jackets Danton Heinen; STL 2nd-round pick in 2026; WSH 3rd-round pick in 2027	To Pittsburgh Penguins Egor Chinakhov
December 31, 2025	To Philadelphia Flyers Philip Tomasino	To Pittsburgh Penguins Egor Zamula

=== January ===
January 5, 2026	To Carolina Hurricanes Juuso Välimäki	To Utah Mammoth future considerations (Note: Considerations unknown.)
January 8, 2026	To Chicago Blackhawks Ryan Ellis; Jake Furlong; 4th-round pick in 2028	To San Jose Sharks Nolan Allan; Laurent Brossoit; 7th-round pick in 2028
January 16, 2026	To Anaheim Ducks Jeffrey Viel	To Boston Bruins conditional (Note: Boston will receive the earlier of Detroit or Philadelphia's fourth-round picks in 2026.) DET 4th-round pick in 2026 or PHI 4th-round pick in 2026
January 16, 2026	To Carolina Hurricanes Kyle Masters; 4th-round pick in 2026	To San Jose Sharks CHI 5th-round pick in 2027
January 18, 2026	To Calgary Flames Zach Whitecloud; Abram Wiebe conditional (Note: Calgary will receive Vegas' first-round pick in 2027 if the pick is outside of the top 10; if the pick is in the top 10 and Vegas fails to win the 2026 Stanley Cup, Calgary will receive Vegas' first-round pick in 2028; otherwise, Calgary will receive Vegas' first-round pick in 2029.) 1st-round pick in 2027 or 1st-round pick in 2028 or 1st-round pick in 2029 conditional (Note: Calgary will receive Vegas' first-round pick in 2028 if Vegas wins the 2026 Stanley Cup; otherwise Calgary will receive Vegas' second-round pick in 2028.) 1st-round pick in 2028 or 2nd-round pick in 2028	To Vegas Golden Knights Rasmus Andersson* (Note: Calgary retained 50% of Andersson's contract.)
January 19, 2026	To San Jose Sharks Kiefer Sherwood	To Vancouver Canucks Cole Clayton; 2nd-round pick in 2026; 2nd-round pick in 2027
January 20, 2026	To Colorado Avalanche Valtteri Puustinen; 7th-round pick in 2026	To Pittsburgh Penguins Ilya Solovyov
January 24, 2026	To Buffalo Sabres Gavin Bayreuther	To Carolina Hurricanes Viktor Neuchev
January 26, 2026	To New York Islanders Carson Soucy	To New York Rangers 3rd-round pick in 2026
January 27, 2026	To New Jersey Devils Maxim Tsyplakov	To New York Islanders Ondřej Palát; 3rd-round pick in 2026; 6th-round pick in 2027

=== February ===
February 2, 2026	To Calgary Flames Gavin White	To Dallas Stars Jérémie Poirier
February 4, 2026	To New Jersey Devils Nick Bjugstad	To St. Louis Blues Thomas Bordeleau conditional (Note: St. Louis will receive the lattermost of Dallas, New Jersey, or Winnipeg's fourth-round picks in 2026.) DAL 4th-round pick in 2026 or NJD 4th-round pick in 2026 or WPG 4th-round pick in 2026
February 4, 2026	To Los Angeles Kings Artemi Panarin* (Note: New York retained 50% of Panarin's contract.)	To New York Rangers Liam Greentree conditional (Note: New York will receive the earlier of Columbus, or Los Angeles' second-round picks in 2026 if Los Angeles wins at least one round of the 2026 Stanley Cup Playoffs; otherwise New York will receive the earlier of Dallas, or Los Angeles' third-round picks in 2026.) CBJ 2nd-round pick in 2026 or LAK 2nd-round pick in 2026 or DAL 3rd-round pick in 2026 or LAK 3rd-round pick in 2026 conditional (Note: New York will receive the Los Angeles' fourth-round pick in 2028 if Los Angeles wins at least two rounds of the 2026 Stanley Cup Playoffs; otherwise no pick will be exchanged.) DAL 4th-round pick in 2028
February 24, 2026	To New York Islanders Matt Luff	To St. Louis Blues Julien Gauthier
February 24, 2026	To Colorado Avalanche Brett Kulak	To Pittsburgh Penguins Sam Girard; 2nd-round pick in 2028

=== March ===
March 1, 2026	To Minnesota Wild Roman Schmidt	To Philadelphia Flyers Boris Katchouk
March 2, 2026	To Chicago Blackhawks 2nd-round pick in 2028	To Edmonton Oilers Connor Murphy* (Note: Chicago retained 50% of Murphy's contract.)
March 3, 2026	To Minnesota Wild Michael McCarron	To Nashville Predators 2nd-round pick in 2028
March 3, 2026	To Nashville Predators Christoffer Sedoff; 3rd-round pick in 2028	To Vegas Golden Knights Cole Smith
March 4, 2026	To Dallas Stars Tyler Myers* (Note: Vancouver retained 50% of Myers' contract.)	To Vancouver Canucks 2nd-round pick in 2027; 4th-round pick in 2029
March 4, 2026	To Colorado Avalanche Nick Blankenburg	To Nashville Predators 5th-round pick in 2027
March 4, 2026	To Calgary Flames Jonathan Castagna; Olli Määttä; 2nd-round pick in 2026; NYR 2nd-round pick in 2026; OTT 2nd-round pick in 2026	To Utah Mammoth MacKenzie Weegar
March 4, 2026	To Chicago Blackhawks Andrew Mangiapane conditional (Note: Chicago will receive Edmonton's first-round pick in 2027 if the pick is outside of the top 12; otherwise, Chicago will receive Edmonton's first-round pick in 2028, unless Edmonton no longer possesses their 2028 first-round pick, in which case Chicago will receive Edmonton's unprotected first-round pick in 2027.) 1st-round pick in 2027 or 1st-round pick in 2028	To Edmonton Oilers Colton Dach; Jason Dickinson* (Note: Chicago retained 50% of Dickinson's contract.)
March 5, 2026	To Vegas Golden Knights Nic Dowd	To Washington Capitals Jesper Vikman; SJS 3rd-round pick in 2027; 2nd-round pick in 2029
March 5, 2026	To Colorado Avalanche Nicolas Roy	To Toronto Maple Leafs conditional (Note: Toronto will receive the lowest of Colorado's, Boston's, or Philadelphia's fifth-round picks in 2026.) BOS 5th-round pick in 2026 or COL 5th-round pick in 2026 or PHI 5th-round pick in 2026 conditional (Note: Toronto will receive Colorado's first-round pick in 2027 if the pick is outside of the top 10, and has not been previously conveyed to the New York Islanders per an earlier trade; otherwise, Toronto will receive Colorado's first-round pick in 2028.) 1st-round pick in 2027 or 1st-round pick in 2028
March 5, 2026	To San Jose Sharks Jett Woo	To Vancouver Canucks Jack Thompson
March 5, 2026	To Florida Panthers conditional (Note: Florida will receive Minnesota's fifth-round pick in 2026 if Minnesota reaches the 2026 Western Conference final and Petry plays in at least half of Minnesota's games in the first two rounds; otherwise, Florida will receive Minnesota's seventh-round pick in 2026.) 5th-round pick in 2026 or 7th-round pick in 2026	To Minnesota Wild Jeff Petry
March 5, 2026	To Dallas Stars Michael Bunting	To Nashville Predators SEA 3rd-round pick in 2026
March 5, 2026	To Los Angeles Kings BUF 2nd-round pick in 2026 conditional (Note: Los Angeles will receive the higher of Ottawa's or Washington's third-round picks in 2026 if one or both of the teams qualify for the 2026 playoffs; otherwise, Los Angeles will receive the lower of Ottawa’s or Washington's third-round picks in 2026.) OTT 3rd-round pick in 2026 or WSH 3rd-round pick in 2026	To Ottawa Senators Warren Foegele conditional (Note: Ottawa will receive the lower of Los Angeles' or Dallas' third-round picks in 2026.) DAL 3rd-round pick in 2026 or LAK 3rd-round pick in 2026
March 5, 2026	To Detroit Red Wings David Perron	To Ottawa Senators conditional (Note: Ottawa will receive Detroit's third-round pick in 2026 if Detroit advances to the second round of the 2026 playoffs and Perron appears in at least 50% of their first round games. Ottawa will receive Columbus' fourth-round pick in 2026 if Perron plays in at least one regular season or playoff game, but Detroit does not advance past the first round, or Perron appears in fewer than 50% of their first round games; otherwise, no pick will be exchanged.) DET 3rd-round pick in 2026 or CBJ 4th-round pick in 2026
March 6, 2026	To Columbus Blue Jackets Conor Garland	To Vancouver Canucks 3rd-round pick in 2026; 2nd-round pick in 2028
March 6, 2026	To Buffalo Sabres Luke Schenn* (Note: Winnipeg retained 50% of Schenn's contract.); Logan Stanley	To Winnipeg Jets Jacob Bryson; Isak Rosén conditional (Note: Winnipeg will receive the higher of Buffalo or Edmonton's fourth-round picks in 2026.) BUF 4th-round pick in 2026 or EDM 4th-round pick in 2026; 2nd-round pick in 2027
March 6, 2026	To Anaheim Ducks John Carlson	To Washington Capitals conditional (Note: Washington will receive a first-round pick in 2026 if Anaheim qualifies for the 2026 Stanley Cup playoffs; otherwise, Washington will receive Anaheim's choice of first-round picks in 2026 or 2027.) 1st-round pick in 2026 or 1st-round pick in 2027; 3rd-round pick in 2027
March 6, 2026	To Buffalo Sabres Sam Carrick	To New York Rangers 3rd-round pick in 2026; CHI 6th-round pick in 2026
March 6, 2026	To Minnesota Wild Bobby Brink	To Philadelphia Flyers David Jiříček
March 6, 2026	To Boston Bruins Alexis Gendron; Massimo Rizzo	To Philadelphia Flyers Jackson Edward; Brett Harrison
March 6, 2026	To Minnesota Wild Nick Foligno	To Chicago Blackhawks future considerations (Note: Considerations unknown.)
March 6, 2026	To Florida Panthers Vinnie Hinostroza	To Minnesota Wild future considerations (Note: Considerations unknown.)
March 6, 2026	To Los Angeles Kings 2nd-round pick in 2028	To Tampa Bay Lightning Corey Perry* (Note: Los Angeles retained 50% of Perry's contract.)
March 6, 2026	To Detroit Red Wings SJS 3rd-round pick in 2026	To Pittsburgh Penguins Elmer Söderblom
March 6, 2026	To Chicago Blackhawks Derrick Pouliot	To New York Rangers Aidan Thompson
March 6, 2026	To Carolina Hurricanes Nicolas Deslauriers	To Philadelphia Flyers conditional (Note: Philadelphia will receive Carolina's seventh-round pick in 2027 if Carolina reaches the 2026 Eastern Conference final and Deslauriers plays in at least half of Carolina's games in the first two rounds; otherwise, no pick will be exchanged.) 7th-round pick in 2027
March 6, 2026	To Seattle Kraken Bobby McMann	To Toronto Maple Leafs ANA 4th-round pick in 2026 conditional (Note: Toronto will receive the later of Columbus' or Winnipeg's second-round picks in 2027.) CBJ 2nd-round pick in 2027 or WPG 2nd-round pick in 2027
March 6, 2026	To Anaheim Ducks 7th-round pick in 2027	To Calgary Flames Ryan Strome
March 6, 2026	To New York Islanders Brayden Schenn	To St. Louis Blues Jonathan Drouin; Marcus Gidlöf conditional (Note: St. Louis will receive Colorado's first-round pick in 2026 if Colorado's first-round pick in 2026 is outside of the top 10; otherwise, St. Louis will receive Colorado's first-round pick in 2027.) COL 1st-round pick in 2026 or COL 1st-round pick in 2027; NJD 3rd-round pick in 2026
March 6, 2026	To Boston Bruins Lukas Reichel	To Vancouver Canucks 6th-round pick in 2026
March 6, 2026	To Vancouver Canucks 6th-round pick in 2026	To Washington Capitals David Kämpf
March 6, 2026	To Detroit Red Wings Justin Faulk	To St. Louis Blues Dmitri Buchelnikov; Justin Holl; 1st-round pick in 2026; SJS 3rd-round pick in 2026
March 6, 2026	To San Jose Sharks VGK 4th-round pick in 2026	To Washington Capitals Timothy Liljegren
March 6, 2026	To Buffalo Sabres Tanner Pearson	To Winnipeg Jets 7th-round pick in 2026
March 6, 2026	To Calgary Flames Brennan Othmann	To New York Rangers Jacob Battaglia
March 6, 2026	To Calgary Flames Max Curran; Victor Olofsson conditional (Note: Calgary will receive the higher of Colorado or Minnesota's second-round picks in 2027.) COL 2nd-round pick in 2027 or MIN 2nd-round pick in 2027 conditional (Note: Calgary will receive Colorado's first-round pick in 2028 if the pick is outside of the top ten selections and has not already been conveyed to the Toronto Maple Leafs per an earlier trade; otherwise, Calgary will receive Colorado's first-round pick in 2029.) 1st-round pick in 2028 or 1st-round pick in 2029	To Colorado Avalanche Nazem Kadri* (Note: Calgary retained 20% of Kadri's contract.); 4th-round pick in 2027
March 6, 2026	To Los Angeles Kings Scott Laughton	To Toronto Maple Leafs conditional (Note: Toronto will receive a second-round pick in 2026 if Los Angeles qualifies for the 2026 playoffs. Toronto will receive the better of Ottawa's or Washington's third-round picks in 2026 if Los Angeles fails to qualify for the 2026 playoffs, but at least one of Ottawa or Washington do; otherwise, Toronto will receive the worse of Ottawa's or Washington's third-round picks in 2026.) LAK 2nd-round pick in 2026 or OTT 3rd-round pick in 2026 or WSH 3rd-round pick in 2026
March 6, 2026	To Ottawa Senators Graeme Clarke	To Washington Capitals Wyatt Bongiovanni
March 12, 2026	To Boston Bruins Navrin Mutter	To Nashville Predators Dalton Bancroft; Massimo Rizzo
March 12, 2026	To Detroit Red Wings Michael Milne; Wojciech Stachowiak	To Tampa Bay Lightning Ian Mitchell
March 12, 2026	To Los Angeles Kings Jan Jeník	To Ottawa Senators Samuel Bolduc
March 13, 2026	To Montreal Canadiens Jake Chiasson; Hunter Shepard	To Ottawa Senators Riley Kidney
March 13, 2026	To Edmonton Oilers Josh Bloom	To Vancouver Canucks Jayden Grubbe

=== June (2026) ===
June 1, 2026	To Chicago Blackhawks 3rd-round pick in 2027	To Tampa Bay Lightning Jack Pridham
June 13, 2026	To Florida Panthers Emil Pieniniemi	To Pittsburgh Penguins Oliver Okuliar
June 16, 2026	To Philadelphia Flyers Simon Benoit; Joseph Woll	To Toronto Maple Leafs Emil Andrae; Samuel Ersson; 3rd-round pick in 2026
June 16, 2026	To Colorado Avalanche Magnus Chrona; 3rd-round pick in 2026; COL 3rd-round pick in 2027	To Nashville Predators Ross Colton; Isak Posch
June 17, 2026	To Buffalo Sabres EDM 1st-round pick in 2026	To San Jose Sharks Michael Kesselring; 1st-round pick in 2026
June 18, 2026	To Boston Bruins FLA 4th-round pick in 2026; MTL 5th-round pick in 2026	To San Jose Sharks Andre Gasseau; 4th-round pick in 2026
June 19, 2026	To Tampa Bay Lightning 5th-round pick in 2026	To Toronto Maple Leafs Darren Raddysh
June 21, 2026	To Florida Panthers TBL 1st-round pick in 2026 conditional (Note: Florida will receive the better of Columbus' or Winnipeg's second-round pick in 2027.) CBJ 2nd-round pick in 2027 or WPG 2nd-round pick in 2027	To Seattle Kraken Mackie Samoskevich
June 21, 2026	To Florida Panthers Brady Tkachuk	To Ottawa Senators 1st-round pick in 2026; TBL 1st-round pick in 2026; 2nd-round pick in 2027 conditional (Note: Ottawa will receive Florida's 1st-round pick in 2029 if it is outside of the top-10; otherwise, Ottawa will receive Florida's first-round pick in 2030.) 1st-round pick in 2029 or 1st-round pick in 2030
June 23, 2026	To Calgary Flames Šimon Nemec; Maxim Tsyplakov	To New Jersey Devils Étienne Morin conditional (Note: New Jersey will receive Vegas' first-round pick in 2027 if the pick is outside of the top ten selections. Otherwise, New Jersey will receive Vegas' first-round pick in 2028.) VGK 1st-round pick in 2027 or VGK 1st-round pick in 2028 conditional (Note: New Jersey will receive Colorado's first-round pick in 2028 if the pick is outside of the top ten selections and Colorado owns the pick at the time of the draft. Otherwise, New Jersey will receive Colorado's first-round pick in 2029.) COL 1st-round pick in 2028 or COL 1st-round pick in 2029; NYR 2nd-round pick in 2026
June 23, 2026	To Ottawa Senators William Eklund; Kasper Halttunen; Brandon Svoboda	To San Jose Sharks FLA 1st-round pick in 2026
June 23, 2026	To St. Louis Blues Milton Gästrin; Connor McMichael; 1st-round pick in 2026	To Washington Capitals Jordan Kyrou
June 23, 2026	To Buffalo Sabres Louis Crevier; 1st-round pick in 2026; NYI 2nd-round pick in 2026	To Chicago Blackhawks Bowen Byram; Jordan Greenway
June 24, 2026	To Colorado Avalanche Zachary L'Heureux; Fedor Svechkov	To Nashville Predators Chase Bradley; Jack Drury; 3rd-round pick in 2029
June 24, 2026	To Buffalo Sabres David Kämpf; SJS 3rd-round pick in 2027	To Washington Capitals Alex Tuch
June 25, 2026	To Florida Panthers Garnet Hathaway* (Note: Philadelphia retained 50% of Hathaway's contract.); 6th-round pick in 2026	To Philadelphia Flyers 5th-round pick in 2026; 4th-round pick in 2027
June 25, 2026	To Pittsburgh Penguins Hendrix Lapierre	To Washington Capitals 3rd-round pick in 2027; SJS 5th-round pick in 2028
June 25, 2026	To Colorado Avalanche STL 2nd-round pick in 2026; 3rd-round pick in 2027; 5th-round pick in 2028	To Columbus Blue Jackets Valeri Nichushkin
June 25, 2026	To Columbus Blue Jackets Luke Tuch	To Montreal Canadiens Hunter McKown
June 25, 2026	To Detroit Red Wings 4th-round pick in 2026	To New Jersey Devils Amadeus Lombardi
June 25, 2026	To New Jersey Devils Declan Chisholm	To Washington Capitals 4th-round pick in 2027
June 26, 2026	To Montreal Canadiens Brett Berard	To New York Rangers William Trudeau
June 26, 2026	To Ottawa Senators Samuel Ersson	To Toronto Maple Leafs 5th-round pick in 2027
June 26, 2026	To Anaheim Ducks Anton Wahlberg; NYI 2nd-round pick in 2026	To Buffalo Sabres Olen Zellweger
June 26, 2026	To Chicago Blackhawks 6th-round pick in 2027	To Ottawa Senators André Burakovsky
June 26, 2026	To Boston Bruins JJ Peterka	To Utah Mammoth 1st-round pick in 2026 conditional (Note: Utah will receive Florida's 1st-round pick in 2028 if it is outside of the top-10; otherwise, Utah will receive Boston's choice of Florida's 1st-round pick in 2028 or their own first-round pick in 2029.) FLA 1st-round pick in 2028 or BOS 1st-round pick in 2029
June 26, 2026	To New York Rangers Pavel Dorofeyev	To Vegas Golden Knights DAL 1st-round pick in 2026; BUF 3rd-round pick in 2026 conditional (Note: Vegas will receive New York's 1st-round pick in 2028 if it is outside of the top-10; otherwise, Vegas will receive New York's first-round pick in 2029.) 1st-round pick in 2028 or 1st-round pick in 2029
June 26, 2026	To Anaheim Ducks COL 1st-round pick in 2026; DET 1st-round pick in 2026	To St. Louis Blues Mason McTavish
June 26, 2026	To Detroit Red Wings BOS 1st-round pick in 2026	To Utah Mammoth Sebastian Cossa
June 27, 2026	To St. Louis Blues Brandon Carlo	To Toronto Maple Leafs NJD 3rd-round pick in 2026; SJS 3rd-round pick in 2026
June 27, 2026	To Nashville Predators Adam Edström	To New York Rangers Massimo Rizzo; EDM 5th-round pick in 2026
June 27, 2026	To Boston Bruins Ivan Ivan	To Colorado Avalanche Fabian Lysell
June 27, 2026	To Anaheim Ducks Kyle Masters; 6th-round pick in 2026	To Carolina Hurricanes John Carlson
June 27, 2026	To Minnesota Wild Future consideratiions (Note: Considerations unknown.)	To New York Islanders Ryan Healey
June 29, 2026	To Nashville Predators Nils Höglander	To Vancouver Canucks COL 3rd-round pick in 2029
June 29, 2026	To Montreal Canadiens Maksymilian Szuber	To Utah Mammoth Joshua Roy
June 29, 2026	To Montreal Canadiens Future considerations (Note: Considerations unknown.)	To Vancouver Canucks Brendan Gallagher* (Note: Montreal retained 50% of Gallagher's contract.)
June 29, 2026	To Anaheim Ducks AJ Greer	To Florida Panthers Radko Gudas
June 29, 2026	To Pittsburgh Penguins David Gustafsson	To Winnipeg Jets Jack St. Ivany
June 29, 2026	To Florida Panthers Akira Schmid	To Vegas Golden Knights 3rd-round pick in 2028
June 30, 2026	To Florida Panthers Angus Crookshank; Jacob Markström	To New Jersey Devils Jesper Boqvist; Evan Rodrigues; Ben Steeves
June 30, 2026	To Anaheim Ducks Noah Philp	To Carolina Hurricanes Kyle Masters
June 30, 2026	To Pittsburgh Penguins Kaedan Korczak	To Vegas Golden Knights Parker Wotherspoon* (Note: Pittsburgh retained 50% of Wotherspoon's contract.)

==== Pick-only trades (2026) ====
June 26, 2026	To Los Angeles Kings 1st-round pick in 2026 (#17 overall)	To Utah Mammoth 1st-round pick in 2026 (#19 overall); 3rd-round pick in 2026 (#83 overall)
June 26, 2026	To Philadelphia Flyers BUF 1st-round pick in 2026 (#27 overall); COL 2nd-round pick in 2026 (#62 overall); BOS 4th-round pick in 2026 (#120 overall)	To San Jose Sharks 1st-round pick in 2026 (#21 overall)
June 26, 2026	To Montreal Canadiens DAL 1st-round pick in 2026 (#26 overall)	To Vegas Golden Knights 1st-round pick in 2026 (#28 overall); 3rd-round pick in 2027
June 26, 2026	To Anaheim Ducks MTL 1st-round pick in 2026 (#28 overall)	To Vegas Golden Knights COL 1st-round pick in 2026 (#29 overall); PHI 4th-round pick in 2026 (#117 overall)
June 26, 2026	To Carolina Hurricanes 2nd-round pick in 2026 (#42 overall); MIN 2nd-round pick in 2026 (#57 overall)	To Nashville Predators 1st-round pick in 2026 (#31 overall)
June 27, 2026	To Chicago Black Hawks NYR 2nd-round pick in 2026 (#35 overall)	To New Jersey Devils TOR 2nd-round pick in 2026 (#37 overall); OTT 4th-round pick in 2026 (#119 overall)
June 27, 2026	To Calgary Flames NSH 2nd-round pick in 2026 (#42 overall)	To Carolina Hurricanes UTA 2nd-round pick in 2026 (#51 overall); 3rd-round pick in 2026 (#68 overall)
June 27, 2026	To Edmonton Oilers 2nd-round pick in 2026 (#58 overall); TOR 5th-round pick in 2026 (#133 overall)	To Tampa Bay Lightning 2nd-round pick in 2026 (#52 overall)
June 27, 2026	To Carolina Hurricanes 2nd-round pick in 2026 (#61 overall); 4th-round pick in 2026 (#125 overall)	To Montreal Canadiens MIN 2nd-round pick in 2026 (#57 overall)
June 27, 2026	To Los Angeles Kings 3rd-round pick in 2026 (#89 overall); 5th-round pick in 2026 (#153 overall)	To Minnesota Wild 3rd-round pick in 2026 (#83 overall)
June 27, 2026	To Columbus Blue Jackets 4th-round pick in 2026 (#112 overall); SJS 5th-round pick in 2028	To Washington Capitals TOR 4th-round pick in 2026 (#101 overall)
June 27, 2026	To New York Rangers 4th-round pick in 2026 (#102 overall)	To Seattle Kraken 5th-round pick in 2026 (#131 overall); EDM 5th-round pick in 2026 (#148 overall)
June 27, 2026	To Los Angeles Kings WPG 4th-round pick in 2026 (#103 overall)	To Montreal Canadiens 4th-round pick in 2026 (#113 overall); COL 6th-round pick in 2026 (#190 overall)
June 27, 2026	To Boston Bruins NSH 6th-round pick in 2026 (#170 overall); WPG 4th-round pick in 2027	To Pittsburgh Penguins DET 4th-round pick in 2026 (#111 overall)
June 27, 2026	To Columbus Blue Jackets 4th-round pick in 2026 (#121 overall); 6th-round pick in 2026 (#185 overall)	To Minnesota Wild WSH 4th-round pick in 2026 (#112 overall)
June 27, 2026	To Montreal Canadiens PHI 4th-round pick in 2026 (#117 overall); 7th-round pick in 2026 (#223 overall)	To Vegas Golden Knights LAK 4th-round pick in 2026 (#113 overall)
June 27, 2026	To Colorado Avalanche 5th-round pick in 2026 (#140 overall)	To New Jersey Devils PHI 5th-round pick in 2026 (#149 overall); 7th-round pick in 2026 (#222 overall)
June 27, 2026	To Nashville Predators 5th-round pick in 2028	To Pittsburgh Penguins CAR 5th-round pick in 2026 (#160 overall)
June 27, 2026	To Nashville Predators 6th-round pick in 2026 (#161 overall)	To Vancouver Canucks OTT 5th-round pick in 2027
June 27, 2026	To Detroit Red Wings 7th-round pick in 2027	To Vegas Golden Knights 7th-round pick in 2026 (#207 overall)
June 27, 2026	To Los Angeles Kings VGK 7th-round pick in 2026 (#223 overall)	To Montreal Canadiens 7th-round pick in 2027

== Waivers ==
Once an NHL player has played in a certain number of games or a set number of seasons has passed since the signing of his first NHL contract (see here), that player must be offered to all of the other NHL teams before he can be assigned to a minor league affiliate.

Date	Player	New team	Previous team	Ref
July 3, 2025	Nick Leddy	San Jose Sharks	St. Louis Blues	
October 1, 2025	Tyson Jost	Nashville Predators	Carolina Hurricanes	
October 2, 2025	Pheonix Copley	Tampa Bay Lightning	Los Angeles Kings	
October 3, 2025	Ilya Solovyov	Colorado Avalanche	Calgary Flames	
October 3, 2025	Cole Schwindt	Florida Panthers	Vegas Golden Knights	
October 3, 2025	Daemon Hunt	Minnesota Wild	Columbus Blue Jackets	
October 5, 2025	Brandon Bussi	Carolina Hurricanes	Florida Panthers	
October 6, 2025	Colten Ellis	Buffalo Sabres	St. Louis Blues	
October 6, 2025	Curtis Douglas	Tampa Bay Lightning	Utah Mammoth	
October 6, 2025	Sammy Blais	Toronto Maple Leafs	Montreal Canadiens	
October 6, 2025	Cayden Primeau	Toronto Maple Leafs	Carolina Hurricanes	
October 15, 2025	Donovan Sebrango	Florida Panthers	Ottawa Senators	
October 16, 2025	Vincent Iorio	San Jose Sharks	Washington Capitals	
November 8, 2025	Cayden Primeau	Carolina Hurricanes	Toronto Maple Leafs	
November 15, 2025	Troy Stecher	Toronto Maple Leafs	Edmonton Oilers	
November 18, 2025	John Beecher	Calgary Flames	Boston Bruins	
November 27, 2025	Sammy Blais	Montreal Canadiens	Toronto Maple Leafs	
December 16, 2025	Jonatan Berggren	St. Louis Blues	Detroit Red Wings	
December 16, 2025	Vladislav Kolyachonok	Boston Bruins	Dallas Stars	
December 29, 2025	Noah Philp	Carolina Hurricanes	Edmonton Oilers	
January 21, 2026	Vladislav Kolyachonok	Dallas Stars	Boston Bruins	
January 31, 2026	Vincent Iorio	New York Rangers	San Jose Sharks	
February 7, 2026	Jack Finley	St. Louis Blues	Tampa Bay Lightning	
February 27, 2026	Tye Kartye	New York Rangers	Seattle Kraken	
March 2, 2026	Robby Fabbri	Minnesota Wild	St. Louis Blues	
March 6, 2026	Curtis Douglas	Vancouver Canucks	Tampa Bay Lightning	
March 6, 2026	Luke Glendening	Philadelphia Flyers	New Jersey Devils	
March 6, 2026	Cole Reinhardt	Florida Panthers	Vegas Golden Knights	

== See also ==
- 2025 NHL entry draft
- 2026 NHL entry draft
- 2027 NHL entry draft
- 2025 in ice hockey
- 2026 in ice hockey
- 2024–25 NHL transactions
- 2026–27 NHL transactions
