= 2027 NHL entry draft =

2027 North American ice hockey draft

General information
- Date: June 25–26, 2027
- Location: TBA

Overview
- First selection: TBA

The 2027 NHL entry draft will be the 65th draft for the National Hockey League. The draft will be held on June 25–26, 2027.

== Eligibility ==
Ice hockey players born between January 1, 2007, and September 15, 2009, are eligible for selection in the 2027 NHL entry draft. Additionally, undrafted, non-North American players born in 2006 are eligible for the draft; and those players who were drafted in the 2025 NHL entry draft, but not signed by an NHL team and who were born after June 30, 2007, are also eligible to re-enter the draft.

== Traded picks ==
The order of the 2027 entry draft will be finalized upon the conclusion of the 2026–27 NHL season. However, some teams have already exchanged picks for this draft via trade. These picks are listed below.

=== Round one ===
1. The Florida Panthers' first-round pick will go to the Chicago Blackhawks as the result of a trade on March 1, 2025, that sent Seth Jones and a fourth-round pick in 2026 to Florida in exchange for Spencer Knight and this pick (being conditional at the time of the trade). The condition – Chicago will receive an unprotected first-round pick in 2027 if Florida does not possess their first-round pick in 2026 before the start of the 2025 NHL entry draft, or Florida's first-round pick in 2026 is inside the top 10 – was converted on April 16th, 2026, when Florida finished the 2025–26 season with the eighth-worst record in the NHL. (Note: By finishing eighth from last, Florida could drop no lower than 10th in the draft lottery, securing a top-10 pick and converting the condition.)

=== Round two ===
1. The Boston Bruins' second-round pick will go to the New York Rangers as the result of a trade on July 1, 2026, that sent Will Borgen to Boston in exchange for a conditional third-round pick in 2028 and this pick.
2. The Buffalo Sabres' second-round pick will go to the Winnipeg Jets as the result of a trade on March 6, 2026, that sent Logan Stanley and Luke Schenn to Buffalo in exchange for Isak Rosén, Jacob Bryson, a conditional fourth-round pick in 2026 and this pick.
3. The Columbus Blue Jackets' second-round pick will go to the Seattle Kraken as the result of a trade on December 19, 2025, that sent Mason Marchment to Columbus in exchange for a fourth-round pick in 2026 and this pick.
4. The Dallas Stars' second-round pick will go to the Vancouver Canucks as the result of a trade on March 4, 2026, that sent Tyler Myers to Dallas in exchange for a fourth-round pick in 2029 and this pick.
5. The Detroit Red Wings' second-round pick will go to the Anaheim Ducks as the result of a trade on June 28, 2025, that sent John Gibson to Detroit in exchange for Petr Mrazek, a fourth-round pick in 2026 and this pick.
6. The Florida Panthers' second-round pick will go to the Ottawa Senators as the result of a trade on June 21, 2026, that sent Brady Tkachuk to Florida in exchange for two first-round picks in 2026, a conditional first-round pick in 2029 and this pick.
7. The Minnesota Wild's second-round pick will go to the Colorado Avalanche as the result of a trade on June 27, 2025, that sent Charlie Coyle and Miles Wood to Columbus in exchange for Gavin Brindley, a third-round pick in 2025 and this pick (being conditional at the time of the trade). The condition – Colorado will receive Minnesota's second-round pick in 2027 if Columbus trades away their own second-round pick in 2027 – was converted on December 19, 2025.
  Columbus previously acquired this pick as the result of a trade on November 30, 2024, that sent David Jiricek and a fifth-round pick in 2025 to Minnesota in exchange for Daemon Hunt, a conditional first-round pick in 2025 or 2026, a third-round pick in 2026, a fourth-round pick in 2026, and this pick.
8. The Nashville Predators' second-round pick will go to the Dallas Stars as the result of a trade on July 1, 2026, that sent Mavrik Bourque and Ilya Lyubushkin to Nashville in exchange for a third-round pick in 2028 and this pick.
9. The New York Rangers' second-round pick will go to the Pittsburgh Penguins as the result of a trade on July 1, 2024, that sent Reilly Smith to New York in exchange for a conditional fifth-round pick in 2025 and this pick.
10. The St. Louis Blues' second-round pick will go to the Anaheim Ducks as the result of a trade on December 14, 2024, that sent Cam Fowler and a fourth-round pick in 2027 to St. Louis in exchange for Jeremie Biakabutuka and this pick.
11. The San Jose Sharks' second-round pick will go to the Vancouver Canucks as the result of a trade on January 19, 2026, that sent Kiefer Sherwood to San Jose in exchange for Cole Clayton, a second-round pick in 2026 and this pick.
12. The Vancouver Canucks' second-round pick will go to the Chicago Blackhawks as the result of a trade on June 26, 2024, that sent a fourth-round pick in 2027 to Vancouver in exchange for Sam Lafferty, Ilya Mikheyev, and this pick.
13. The Vegas Golden Knights' second-round pick will go to the Montreal Canadiens as the result of a trade on October 9, 2026, that sent Jayden Struble to Nashville in exchange for this pick.
  Nashville previously acquired this pick as the result of a trade on June 30, 2025, that sent Colton Sissons and Jeremy Lauzon to Vegas in exchange for Nicolas Hague and this pick (being conditional at the time of the trade). The condition – Nashville will receive Vegas' second-round pick in 2027 if Vegas wins two rounds in the 2026 Stanley Cup playoffs – was converted on May 14, 2026.
14. The Winnipeg Jets' second-round pick will go to the Seattle Kraken as the result of a trade on March 7, 2025, that sent Brandon Tanev to Winnipeg in exchange for this pick.

=== Round three ===
1. The Anaheim Ducks' third-round pick will go to the Washington Capitals as the result of a trade on March 6, 2026, that sent John Carlson to Anaheim in exchange for a conditional first-round pick in 2026 and this pick.
2. The Boston Bruins' third-round pick will go to the Columbus Blue Jackets as the result of a trade on March 8, 2024, that sent Andrew Peeke to Boston in exchange for Jakub Zboril and this pick.
3. The Colorado Avalanche's third-round pick was re-acquired as the result of a trade on June 16, 2026, that sent Ross Colton and Isak Posch to Nashville in exchange for Magnus Chrona, a third-round pick in 2026, and this pick.
  Nashville previously acquired this pick as the result of a trade on December 28, 2024, that sent Juuso Parssinen and a seventh-round pick in 2026 to Colorado in exchange for Ondrej Pavel and this pick.
4. The Columbus Blue Jackets' third-round pick will go to the Colorado Avalanche as the result of a trade on June 25, 2026, that sent Valeri Nichushkin to Columbus in exchange for a second-round pick in 2026, a fifth-round pick in 2028 and this pick.
5. The Dallas Stars' third-round pick will go to the Carolina Hurricanes as the result of a trade on March 7, 2025, that sent Mikko Rantanen to Dallas in exchange for Logan Stankoven, a conditional first-round pick in 2026, a third-round pick in 2026, a conditional first-round pick in 2028, and this pick.
6. The Edmonton Oilers' third round pick will go to the Nashville Predators as the result of a trade on December 12, 2025, that sent Spencer Stastney to Edmonton in exchange for this pick.
7. The Los Angeles Kings' third-round pick will go to the Philadelphia Flyers as the result of a trade on March 7, 2025, that sent Andrei Kuzmenko and a seventh-round pick in 2025 to Los Angeles in exchange for this pick.
8. The Minnesota Wild's third-round pick will go to the Calgary Flames as the result of a trade on July 2, 2026, that sent Blake Coleman and Olii Maatta to Minnesota in exchange for Jake Middleton, a fourth-round pick in 2028, a second-round pick in 2029 and this pick.
9. The Montreal Canadiens' third-round pick will go to the Vegas Golden Knights as the result of a trade on June 26, 2026, that sent the 26th overall selection in 2026 to Montreal in exchange for the 28th overall selection in 2026 and this pick.
10. The New Jersey Devils' third-round pick will go to the Pittsburgh Penguins as the result of a trade on March 7, 2025, that sent Cody Glass and Jonathan Gruden to New Jersey in exchange for Max Graham, Chase Stillman, and this pick.
11. The Pittsburgh Penguins' third-round pick will go to the Washington Capitals as the result of a trade on June 25, 2026, that sent Hendrix Lapierre to Pittsburgh in exchange for a fifth-round pick in 2028 and this pick.
12. The San Jose Sharks' third-round pick will go to the Buffalo Sabres as the result of a trade on June 24, 2026, that sent Alex Tuch to Washington in exchange for David Kampf, and this pick.
  Washington previously acquired this pick as the result of a trade on March 5, 2026, that sent Nic Dowd to Vegas exchange for Jesper Vikman, a second-round pick in 2029 and this pick.
  Vegas previously acquired this pick as the result of a trade on March 8, 2024, that sent David Edstrom and a first-round pick in 2025 to San Jose in exchange for Tomas Hertl, a third-round pick in 2025, and this pick.
13. The Tampa Bay Lightning's third-round pick will go to the Chicago Blackhawks as the result of a trade on June 1, 2026, that sent Jack Pridham to Tampa Bay in exchange for this pick.
14. The Toronto Maple Leafs' third-round pick will go to the Utah Mammoth as the result of a trade on June 30, 2025, that sent Matias Maccelli to Toronto in exchange for this conditional pick. The condition – Utah will receive a third-round pick in 2027 if Toronto misses the 2026 Stanley Cup playoffs or Maccelli records fewer than 51 points for Toronto in the 2025–26 NHL season – was converted when Toronto was eliminated from 2026 playoff contention on April 2, 2026.
15. The Washington Capitals' third-round pick will go to the Columbus Blue Jackets as the result of a trade on December 29, 2025, that sent Egor Chinakhov to Pittsburgh in exchange for Danton Heinen, a second-round pick in 2026 and this pick.
  Pittsburgh previously acquired this pick as the result of a trade on November 12, 2024, that sent Lars Eller to Washington in exchange for a fifth-round pick in 2025 and this pick.

=== Round four ===
1. The Anaheim Ducks' fourth-round pick will go to the St. Louis Blues as the result of a trade on December 14, 2024, that sent Jeremie Biakabutuka and a second-round pick in 2027 to Anaheim in exchange for Cam Fowler and this pick.
2. The Calgary Flames' fourth-round pick will go to the Colorado Avalanche as the result of a trade on March 6, 2026, that sent Victor Olofsson, Maxmilian Curran, a conditional first-round pick in 2028 and a conditional second-round pick in 2027 to Calgary in exchange for Nazem Kadri and this pick.
3. The Chicago Blackhawks' fourth-round pick was re-acquired as the result of a trade on October 24, 2025 that sent Lukas Reichel to Vancouver in exchange for this pick.
  The Vancouver Canucks previously acquired this pick as the result of a trade on June 26, 2024, that sent Sam Lafferty, Ilya Mikheyev, and a second-round pick in 2027 to Chicago in exchange for this pick.
4. The Edmonton Oilers' fourth-round pick will go to the Utah Mammoth as the result of a trade on March 7, 2024, that sent Troy Stecher and a seventh-round pick in 2024 to Edmonton in exchange for this pick.
5. The New Jersey Devils' fourth-round pick will go to the Washington Capitals as the result of a trade on June 25, 2026, that sent Declan Chisholm to New Jersey in exchange for this pick.
6. The New York Rangers' fourth-round pick will go to the Nashville Predators as the result of a trade on November 25, 2024, that sent Philip Tomasino to Pittsburgh in exchange for this pick.
  Pittsburgh previously acquired this pick as the result of a trade on March 8, 2024, that sent Chad Ruhwedel to New York in exchange for this pick.
7. The Pittsburgh Penguins' fourth-round pick will go to the Vancouver Canucks as the result of a trade on July 13, 2025, that sent Arturs Silovs to Pittsburgh in exchange for Chase Stillman and this pick.
8. The Toronto Maple Leafs' fourth-round pick will go to the Tampa Bay Lightning as the result of a trade on July 1, 2026, that sent Nick Paul to Toronto in exchange for Dennis Hildeby, a third-round pick in 2028 and this pick.
9. The Winnipeg Jets' fourth-round pick will go to the Boston Bruins as the result of a trade on June 27, 2026, that sent a fourth-round pick in 2026 to Pittsburgh in exchange for a sixth-round pick in 2026 and this pick.
  Pittsburgh previously acquired this pick as the result of a trade on March 7, 2025, that sent Luke Schenn to Winnipeg in exchange for a second-round pick in 2026 and this pick.

=== Round five ===
1. The Boston Bruins' fifth-round pick will go to the Edmonton Oilers as the result of a trade on July 1, 2025, that sent Viktor Arvidsson to Boston in exchange for this pick.
2. The Chicago Blackhawks' fifth-round pick will go to the San Jose Sharks as the result of a trade on January 16, 2026, that sent Kyle Masters and a fourth-round pick in 2026 to Carolina in exchange for this pick.
  Carolina previously acquired this pick as the result of a trade on June 27, 2025, that sent a first-round pick in 2025 to Chicago in exchange for a second-round pick in 2025, Dallas's second-round pick in 2025 and this pick.
3. The Colorado Avalanche's fifth-round pick will go to the Nashville Predators as the result of a trade on March 4, 2026, that sent Nick Blankenburg to Colorado in exchange for this pick.
4. The Ottawa Senators' fifth-round pick will go to the Vancouver Canucks as the result of a trade on June 27, 2026 that sent a sixth-round pick in 2026 to Toronto in exchange for this pick.
  Toronto previously acquired this pick as the result of a trade on June 26, 2026, that sent Samuel Ersson to Ottawa in exchange for this pick.
5. The San Jose Sharks' fifth-round pick will go to the Colorado Avalanche as the result of a trade on December 9, 2024, that sent Alexandar Georgiev, Nikolai Kovalenko, a conditional fourth or fifth-round pick in 2025, and a second-round pick in 2026 to San Jose in exchange for Mackenzie Blackwood, Givani Smith, and this pick.
6. The Tampa Bay Lightning's fifth-round pick will go to the Utah Mammoth as the result of a trade on March 8, 2024, that sent Matt Dumba and a seventh-round pick in 2025 to Tampa Bay in exchange for this pick.

=== Round six ===
1. The New Jersey Devils' sixth-round pick will go to the New York Islanders as the result of a trade on January 27, 2026, that sent Maxim Tsyplakov to New Jersey in exchange for Ondrej Palat, a third-round pick in 2026, and this pick.
2. The Ottawa Senators' sixth-round pick will go to the Chicago Blackhawks as the result of a trade on June 26, 2026, that sent André Burakovsky to Ottawa in exchange for this pick.
3. The Philadelphia Flyers' sixth-round pick will go to the Toronto Maple Leafs as the result of a trade on March 7, 2025, that sent Nikita Grebenkin and a conditional first-round pick in 2027 or 2028 to Philadelphia in exchange for Scott Laughton, a fourth-round pick in 2025, and this pick.
4. The Washington Capitals' sixth-round pick will go to the Florida Panthers as the result of a trade on June 26, 2025, that sent Justin Sourdif to Washington in exchange for a second-round pick in 2026 and this pick.

=== Round seven ===
1. The Calgary Flames' seventh-round pick will go to the Anaheim Ducks as the result of a trade on March 6, 2026, that sent Ryan Strome to Calgary in exchange for this pick.
2. The Detroit Red Wings' seventh-round pick will go to the Vegas Golden Knights as the result of a trade on July 1, 2026, that sent Keegan Kolesar to Detroit in exchange for a third-round pick in 2029 and this pick.
3. The Los Angeles Kings' seventh-round pick will go to the Montreal Canadiens as the result of a trade on June 27, 2026 that sent a seventh-round pick in 2026 to Los Angeles in exchange for this pick.
4. The New Jersey Devils' seventh-round pick will go to the Winnipeg Jets as the result of a trade on October 23, 2026, that sent Connor Hellebuyck to New Jersey in exchange for Dawson Mercer, Alexander Command, Nick Bjugstad, Nico Daws, a second-round pick in 2029 and this pick.
5. The Ottawa Senators' seventh-round pick will go to the Washington Capitals as the result of a trade on June 28, 2025, that sent Carolina's third-round pick in 2025 to Ottawa in exchange for Florida's third-round pick in 2025 and this pick.
6. The San Jose Sharks' seventh-round pick will go to the Florida Panthers as the result of a trade on March 6, 2025, that sent a fourth-round pick in 2026 to San Jose in exchange for Nico Sturm and this pick.
7. The Vegas Golden Knights' seventh-round pick will go to the Detroit Red Wings as the result of a trade on June 27, 2026, that sent a seventh-round pick in 2026 to Vegas in exchange for this pick.
8. The Washington Capitals' seventh-round pick will go to the New Jersey Devils as the result of a trade on November 1, 2026, that sent Remi Poirier to Washington in exchange for this pick.

=== Unresolved conditional draft picks ===
The following draft picks have been dealt with a condition attached that could not be resolved yet. They are listed below with round, teams, condition itself and further notes, e.g. the players or picks involved in the respective trade.

Round	Team receiving pick	Team granting pick	Condition	Further notes
1	Toronto Maple Leafs	Colorado Avalanche	Toronto will receive a first-round pick in 2027 if the pick is outside of the top ten selections. Otherwise, Toronto will receive Colorado's first-round pick in 2028.	Toronto acquired this pick in a trade on March 5, 2026, that sent Nicolas Roy to Colorado in exchange for a conditional fifth-round pick in 2026 and this conditional pick.
1	Chicago Blackhawks	Edmonton Oilers	Chicago will receive a first-round pick in 2027 if the pick is outside of the top twelve selections or if Edmonton has traded their first-round pick in 2028 before the 2027 NHL trade deadline. Otherwise Chicago will receive a first-round pick in 2028	Chicago acquired this pick in a trade on March 4, 2026, that sent Jason Dickinson and Colton Dach to Edmonton in exchange for Andrew Mangiapane and this conditional pick.
1	Seattle Kraken	Tampa Bay Lightning	Seattle will receive a first-round pick in 2027 if the pick is outside of the top ten selections in 2027. Otherwise, Seattle will receive Tampa Bay's first round pick in 2028.	Seattle acquired this pick in a trade on March 5, 2025, that sent Kyle Aucoin, Oliver Bjorkstrand and a fifth-round pick in 2026 to Tampa Bay in exchange for Mikey Eyssimont, Toronto's second-round pick in 2025 and this conditional pick.
1	Boston Bruins	Toronto Maple Leafs	Boston will receive Toronto's first round pick in 2027 if Toronto's first-round pick in 2027 is within the top ten selections and Toronto elects to convey the pick to Boston over Philadelphia. Otherwise, Boston will receive a first-round pick in 2028.	Boston acquired this pick in a trade on March 7, 2025, that sent Brandon Carlo to Toronto in exchange for Fraser Minten, a fourth-round pick in 2025 and this conditional pick.
1	Philadelphia Flyers	Toronto Maple Leafs	Philadelphia will receive Toronto's first-round pick in 2027 if the pick is outside of the top ten selections. If the pick is within the top ten selections, Philadelphia will receive the pick if Toronto chooses to convey the pick to Philadelphia instead of Boston. Otherwise, Philadelphia will receive a first-round pick in 2028.	Philadelphia acquired this pick in a trade on March 7, 2025, that sent Scott Laughton, a fourth-round pick in 2025 and a sixth-round pick in 2027 to Toronto in exchange for Nikita Grebenkin and this conditional pick.
1	New Jersey Devils (via Calgary Flames)	Vegas Golden Knights	New Jersey will receive Vegas' first-round pick in 2027 if the pick is outside of the top ten selections. Otherwise, New Jersey will receive a first-round pick in 2028.	New Jersey acquired this pick as the result of a trade on June 23, 2026, that sent Simon Nemec and Maxim Tsyplakov to Calgary in exchange for Etienne Morin, Colorado's conditional 2028 or 2029 first-round pick, the New York Rangers' second-round pick in 2026, and this conditional pick. Calgary previously acquired this pick in a trade on January 18, 2026, that sent Rasmus Andersson to Vegas in exchange for Zach Whitecloud, Abram Wiebe, a conditional second-round pick in 2028, and this conditional pick.
2	Calgary Flames	Colorado Avalanche	Calgary will receive the better of Colorado or Minnesota's second-round pick in 2027.	Calgary acquired this pick in a trade on March 6, 2026, that sent Nazem Kadri and a fourth-round pick in 2027 to Colorado in exchange for Victor Olofsson, Maximilian Curran, a conditional first-round pick in 2028 and this conditional pick.
2	Florida Panthers	Seattle Kraken	Florida will receive the better of Columbus or Winnipeg's second-round picks in 2027.	Florida acquired this pick in a trade on June 21, 2026, that sent Mackie Samoskevich to Seattle in exchange for a first-round pick in 2026 and this conditional pick.
2	Columbus Blue Jackets (via Toronto Maple Leafs)	Seattle Kraken	Columbus will receive the lower of Columbus or Winnipeg's second-round picks in 2027.	Columbus acquired this pick in a trade on September 28, 2026, that sent Kirill Marchenko, Miles Wood and Elvis Merzļikins to Toronto in exchange for Emil Andrae, Matthew Knies, Steven Lorentz and this conditional pick. Toronto previously acquired this pick in a trade on March 6, 2026, that sent Bobby McMann to Seattle in exchange for a fourth-round pick in 2026 and this conditional pick.
3	New York Rangers	Utah Mammoth	The Rangers will receive the earliest of Utah's owned third-round picks in 2027.	The Rangers acquired this pick in a trade on July 1, 2026, that sent Vincent Trocheck to Utah in exchange for Sean Durzi, Cole Beaudoin and this conditional pick.

== See also ==
- 2023–24 NHL transactions
- 2024–25 NHL transactions
- 2025–26 NHL transactions
- List of first overall NHL draft picks
- List of NHL players
