= Philip Tomasino =

Canadian ice hockey player (born 2001)

- Born: July 28, 2001 (age 25) Mississauga, Ontario, Canada
- Height: 6 ft 0 in (183 cm)
- Weight: 187 lb (85 kg; 13 st 5 lb)
- Position: Forward
- Shoots: Right
- NHL team Former teams: Ottawa Senators; Nashville Predators; Pittsburgh Penguins
- NHL draft: 24th overall, 2019; Nashville Predators
- Playing career: 2021–present

Philip Tomasino (born July 28, 2001) is a Canadian professional ice hockey player who is a forward for the Ottawa Senators of the National Hockey League (NHL). He was drafted 24th overall by the Nashville Predators in the first round of the 2019 NHL entry draft. He also previously played for the Pittsburgh Penguins.

== Playing career ==
=== Amateur ===
==== Niagara IceDogs ====
Tomasino was drafted by the Niagara IceDogs of the Ontario Hockey League (OHL) in the first round, fifth overall, at the 2017 OHL Priority Draft. He had previously played minor midget hockey for the Mississauga Rebels. Tomasino played in his first game with the IceDogs on September 23, 2017, earning an assist in a 4–1 victory over the Hamilton Bulldogs. On October 19, Tomasino scored his first career OHL goal, as he scored against goaltender Jacob Ingham of the Mississauga Steelheads in a 6–3 win. In 61 games during the 2017–18 season, Tomasino scored five goals and 24 points. On March 2, 2018, Tomasino was named Central Division Academic Player of the Month for February. The IceDogs finished fourth in the Eastern Conference and qualified for the playoffs. They advanced to the Eastern Conference semifinal where they were knocked out by the Bulldogs. In ten playoff games, Tomasino went scoreless.

Tomasino saw his offensive production increase in his second season with the IceDogs in 2018–19. On September 29, Tomasino earned three assists in a 6–1 win over the North Bay Battalion. He recorded the first multi-goal game of his OHL career on November 17, scoring twice in a 6–3 victory over the Erie Otters. Tomasino set a new career high for points in a game, as on December 15, he scored two goals and added three assists in a 6–2 win over the Oshawa Generals. In 67 games with the IceDogs, Tomasino scored 34 goals and 72 points. The IceDogs won the Central Division and finished third in the Eastern Conference. They faced the Battalion in the opening round of the playoffs. On March 26, 2019, Tomasino earned his first career OHL playoff goal, as he scored twice against Christian Propp of the Battalion, and added an assist in a 6–0 win. The IceDogs beat the Battalion and advanced to the Eastern Conference semifinal, but were eliminated for the second consecutive campaign, this time by the Generals. In 11 postseason games, Tomasino scored four goals and seven points.

Tomasino returned to the IceDogs for the 2019–20 season, as he was named an alternate captain. On October 4, Tomasino scored his first career OHL hat-trick, as he scored three goals, and added three assists, for his first career six-point game, in an 8–4 win over the Kingston Frontenacs. On January 2, 2020, Tomasino scored a goal and added four assists in a 9–8 overtime victory over the Battalion. On January 9, the IceDogs traded Tomasino to the Generals for defenceman David Guicciradi and nine draft picks. In 36 games with the IceDogs, Tomasino scored 22 goals and 57 points.

==== Oshawa Generals ====
Tomasino finished the 2019–20 season with the Oshawa Generals following a mid-season trade with the IceDogs. Tomasino played his first game with the Generals on January 9, as he scored two goals and added three assists for a five-point game in a 6–3 win over the Windsor Spitfires. Tomasino's first goal with the Generals was against Xavier Medina. On January 25, Tomasino recorded a four-point game with Oshawa, as he scored a goal and added three assists in a 7–4 win over the Frontenacs. In 26 games with Oshawa, Tomasino scored 18 goals and 43 points. However, the season was cancelled on March 18, 2020 due to the COVID-19 pandemic. Overall, between the IceDogs and his time with the Generals, Tomasino scored 40 goals and 100 points in 62 games, as he ranked fourth in OHL scoring during the regular season.

=== Professional ===
==== Nashville Predators ====
Tomasino was selected by the Nashville Predators of the National Hockey League (NHL) in the first round, 24th overall, at the 2019 NHL entry draft, held at Rogers Arena in Vancouver, British Columbia. Tomasino was signed by the Predators to a three-year, entry-level contract on October 21, 2019. He joined the Predators' organization for the pandemic-shortened 2020–21 season and was assigned to the American Hockey League (AHL) affiliate Chicago Wolves. In 29 games with the Wolves, he scored 13 goals and 32 points. He was named to the AHL's 2021 All-Rookie Team.

Tomasino made the Predators' opening night roster for the 2021–22 season and made his NHL debut on October 14, 2021 in a 4–3 loss to the Seattle Kraken. He scored his first NHL goal and point in his next game, a 3–1 loss to the New York Rangers on October 21. Playing on the fourth line alongside Michael McCarron and Matt Luff, he recorded his first three-point game on March 5, 2022, assisting on three goals as the line combined for ten points overall in an 8–0 victory over the San Jose Sharks. He had a second three-point game on April 5, scoring once and assisting on goals by Roman Josi and Ryan Johansen in a 6–2 win over the Minnesota Wild. The Predators finished in the second wildcard spot and faced the Colorado Avalanche in the 2022 Stanley Cup playoffs. The Predators were swept in four games in their best-of-seven series with the Avalanche. Tomasino was a healthy scratch for one game and when he was in the lineup, he slotted in alongside McCarron, Eeli Tolvanen, and Cody Glass. In three playoff games, he went scoreless.

He was assigned to the Predators' AHL affiliate, the Milwaukee Admirals, to start the 2022–23 season, having been surpassed by Kiefer Sherwood in training camp. In 38 games with the Admirals, he tallied 12 goals and 32 points. He was recalled by Nashville on February 13 after star forward Filip Forsberg was injured. He made his NHL season debut that night in a 4–2 loss to the Arizona Coyotes. In 31 games with Nashville, he scored five times and marked 18 points. The team failed to make the playoffs and Tomasino was sent back to the AHL to play for the Admirals in the 2023 Calder Cup playoffs. The Admirals advanced to face the Coachella Valley Firebirds in the Western Conference final but ultimately lost to them. In 16 playoff games, Tomasino added two goals and nine points.

Tomasino remained with Nashville to start the 2023–24 season, making his season debut in the opening night game, a 5–3 loss to the Tampa Bay Lightning. However, over the first 13 games of the campaign, he was a healthy scratch in six of them. By the All-Star break, Tomasino had turned his game around, but head coach Andrew Brunette remained unconvinced in his ability to take his game to the next level, and on February 13, 2024, he was assigned to Milwaukee. In 41 games with Nashville, he recorded seven goals and 20 points. With the Admirals, he made 22 appearances, scoring 11 goals and 18 points as the team qualified for the 2024 Calder Cup playoffs. They were eliminated by Coachella Valley for the second consecutive season in the Western Conference final. In 15 playoff games, Tomasino scored five goals and six points. In the offseason, Tomasino was a restricted free agent and signed a one-year contract to remain with the Predators. He made the Predators' opening night roster for the 2024–25 season and appeared in 11 games, registering one assist.

==== Pittsburgh Penguins ====
On November 25, 2024, Tomasino was traded by the Predators to the Pittsburgh Penguins in exchange for a fourth-round pick in the 2027 NHL entry draft. His acquisition was made on the agreement between general manager Kyle Dubas and head coach Mike Sullivan that Tomasino would get more playing time with Pittsburgh than he did in Nashville. He made his Penguins debut on November 27 in a game against the Vancouver Canucks. He scored his first goal as a Penguin in his second game against the Boston Bruins. Tomasino started off strong with the Penguins, but his play fell off as the season wore on. In 50 games with Pittsburgh, he tallied 11 goals and 23 points as the team failed to make the playoffs.

Set to be a restricted free agent in the 2025 offseason, Tomasino did not receive a qualifying offer from the Penguins and became an unrestricted free agent. However, he re-signed with the Penguins on July 1 to a one-year, $1.75 million contract. He began the 2025–26 season with Pittsburgh, but in the team's first seven games, he was a healthy scratch three times. On November 18, he was placed on waivers having been a healthy scratch in ten of 19 games. In the nine games he did play with Pittsburgh, he had one assist. Having passed through waivers unclaimed, he was assigned to Pittsburgh's AHL affiliate, the Wilkes-Barre/Scranton Penguins, on November 24. In 14 games in the AHL with Wilkes-Barre/Scranton, he marked five goals and 15 points.

==== Philadelphia Flyers ====
On December 31, 2025, the Philadelphia Flyers acquired Tomasino from the Pittsburgh Penguins in exchange for defenceman Egor Zamula. Following the trade, Tomasino was expected to report to the Flyers' AHL affiliate, the Lehigh Valley Phantoms. In 38 games with Lehigh Valley, he scored seven goals and 26 points. Following the season, he was not tendered a qualifying offer by the Flyers, making him an unrestricted free agent.

==== Ottawa Senators ====
As a free agent from the Flyers, Tomasino was signed by the Ottawa Senators to a one-year, two-way contract for the 2026–27 season on July 1, 2026. He was placed on waivers by the Senators at the end of training camp and after going unclaimed, was assigned to Ottawa's AHL affiliate, the Belleville Senators, to start the season. Tomasino was called up at the end of October and made his Ottawa debut on October 31 versus the Sharks in a 5–1 victory, recording his point for the team when he assisted on Drake Batherson's second period goal.

== International play ==
Medal record

Representing Canada

Ice hockey

World Junior Championships
Silver medal – second place	2021 Canada	

Tomasino was selected to play for Team Canada at the 2021 World Junior Ice Hockey Championships. In the second game of the tournament, he scored a goal and recorded an assist to help Canada win 3–1 over Slovakia. In the tournament, he finished with four goals and six points as Canada won the silver medal.

== Personal life ==
Tomasino grew up in the Toronto area. Tomasino is of Italian descent through his father.

== Career statistics ==
=== Regular season and playoffs ===
			Regular season					Playoffs
Season	Team	League	GP	G	A	Pts	PIM	GP	G	A	Pts	PIM
2016–17	Mississauga Rebels	GTMMHL	54	37	31	68	—	—	—	—	—	—
2017–18	Niagara IceDogs	OHL	61	5	19	24	18	10	0	0	0	2
2018–19	Niagara IceDogs	OHL	67	34	38	72	32	11	4	3	7	5
2019–20	Niagara IceDogs	OHL	36	22	35	57	20	—	—	—	—	—
2019–20	Oshawa Generals	OHL	26	18	25	43	12	—	—	—	—	—
2020–21	Chicago Wolves	AHL	29	13	19	32	43	—	—	—	—	—
2021–22	Nashville Predators	NHL	76	11	21	32	10	3	0	0	0	12
2022–23	Milwaukee Admirals	AHL	38	12	20	32	24	16	2	7	9	4
2022–23	Nashville Predators	NHL	31	5	13	18	6	—	—	—	—	—
2023–24	Nashville Predators	NHL	41	7	13	20	25	—	—	—	—	—
2023–24	Milwaukee Admirals	AHL	22	11	7	18	11	15	5	1	6	4
2024–25	Nashville Predators	NHL	11	0	1	1	0	—	—	—	—	—
2024–25	Pittsburgh Penguins	NHL	50	11	12	23	8	—	—	—	—	—
2025–26	Pittsburgh Penguins	NHL	9	0	1	1	0	—	—	—	—	—
2025–26	Wilkes-Barre/Scranton Penguins	AHL	14	5	10	15	25	—	—	—	—	—
2025–26	Lehigh Valley Phantoms	AHL	38	7	19	26	28	—	—	—	—	—
NHL totals			218	34	61	95	49	3	0	0	0	12

=== International ===
Year	Team	Event	GP	G	A	Pts	PIM
2017	Canada Black	U17	5	0	1	1	0
2019	Canada	U18	6	1	4	5	2
2021	Canada	WJC	7	4	2	6	0
Junior totals			18	5	7	12	2

Awards and achievements
Preceded by Eeli Tolvanen	Nashville Predators first-round draft pick 2019	Succeeded by Yaroslav Askarov
