= Samuel Ersson =

Swedish ice hockey player (born 1999)

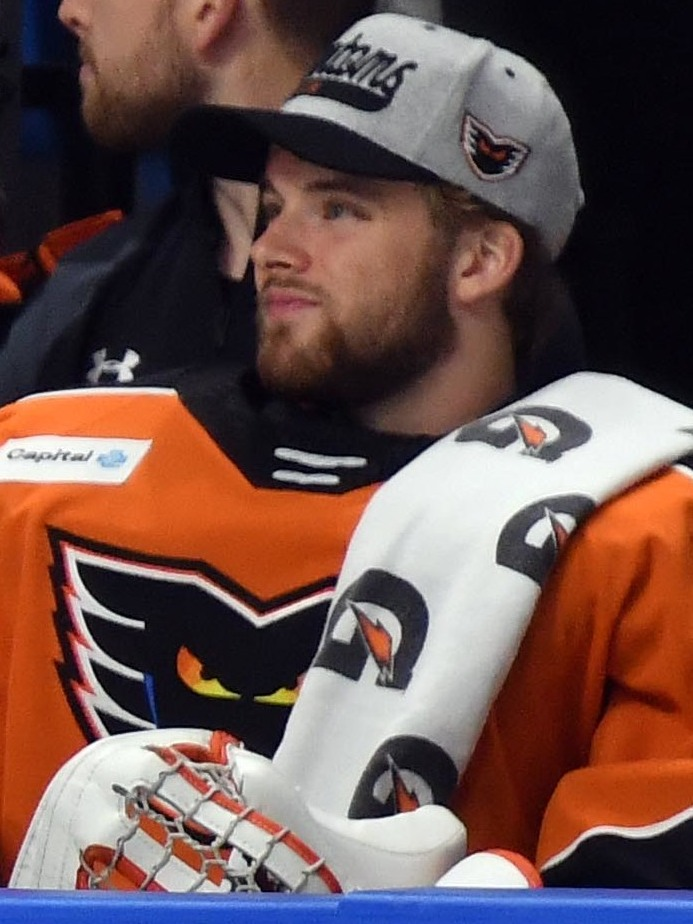
- Ersson with the Lehigh Valley Phantoms in 2021
- Born: 20 October 1999 (age 27) Falun, Sweden
- Height: 6 ft 2 in (188 cm)
- Weight: 176 lb (80 kg; 12 st 8 lb)
- Position: Goaltender
- Catches: Left
- NHL team Former teams: Ottawa Senators; Brynäs IF; Philadelphia Flyers
- National team: Sweden
- NHL draft: 143rd overall, 2018; Philadelphia Flyers
- Playing career: 2017–present

Samuel Ersson (born 20 October 1999) is a Swedish professional ice hockey player who is a goaltender for the Ottawa Senators of the National Hockey League (NHL). He was selected by the Philadelphia Flyers in the fifth round of the 2018 NHL entry draft.

== Playing career ==
=== Sweden ===
Ersson played as a youth with Falu IF before joining the Brynäs IF organization of the Swedish Hockey League (SHL) in 2015. He made his debut for the organization in the 2015–16 season. He spent three seasons with Brynäs' J18 and J20 teams, but in 2018–19, chose to transfer to Västerås IK to play in the HockeyAllsvenskan. He put up a record of 27 wins and 9 losses (27–9–0) with a goals against average (GAA) of 1.95 and a save percentage of .933 as the team finished third in the league. Ersson was awarded the Guldgallret, which recognizes the best junior player in HockeyAllsvenskan, for his play during the 2018–19 season. He signed a contract to return to the Brynäs IF organization for the 2019–20 season. In his first season with Brynäs in the SHL in 2019–20, he put up a record of 14–20–0, with a GAA of 2.90 and a save percentage of .895 and one shutout. However, on 15 March 2020, the Swedish Hockey Association cancelled the remainder of the season due to the COVID-19 pandemic. In his second season with Brynäs in 2020–21, he put up a record 16–26–0 with a GAA of 2.96, a save percentage of .910 and three shutouts. However, Brynäs faced relegation and faced HV71 in the playout. Brynäs won the series and remained in the SHL.

=== Philadelphia Flyers ===
Ersson was selected by the Philadelphia Flyers of the National Hockey League (NHL) in the fifth round. 143rd overall, of the 2018 NHL entry draft. On 3 June 2021, Ersson was signed by the Flyers to a three-year, entry-level contract. He began his professional career in North America with the Lehigh Valley Phantoms, the Flyers' American Hockey League (AHL) affiliate, but only played in five games of the 2021–22 season due to injuries, one of which required groin surgery. In the five games, he had a record of 0–3–1 with a GAA of 2.96 and a save percentage of .893. Ersson started the 2022–23 season on the Flyers bench after backup Felix Sandström began the season injured. However, after Sandström returned from injury, he was assigned to Lehigh Valley on 16 October without having appeared. He was recalled again on 21 December and made his NHL debut on 23 December, in a 6–5 loss to the Carolina Hurricanes. He would get pulled in the second period to be put back in later in the game; however, Carter Hart would be handed the loss. Ersson got his first NHL win on 29 December, in a 4–3 overtime win over the San Jose Sharks, and would get his first shutout against the Buffalo Sabres on 9 January 2023. He was returned to the AHL on 20 January after Sandström returned to the Flyers from Lehigh Valley. He was recalled twice more during the season and finished with a record of 6–3–0 with a 3.07 GAA and a .899 save percentage with the Flyers. In 42 games with Lehigh Valley, he had a 24–17–1 record, a 2.84 GAA, and a .900 save percentage with one shutout. The Phantoms made the playoffs but were eliminated by the Charlotte Checkers in the opening round. In three playoff games Ersson registered a 1–2–0 record with a GAA of 3.71 and a save percentage of .875.

On 5 August 2023, Ersson signed a two-year, $2.9 million contract extension with the Flyers. He opened the 2023–24 season as Hart's backup. However, after Hart left the team in January 2024, Ersson took on a larger role. In his first full NHL season, he had a 23–19–7 record with a 2.82 GAA and a .890 save percentage in 51 games with four shutouts. In his second season with the Flyers in 2024–25, Ersson began the season as the team's starting goaltender, backed up by Ivan Fedotov. However, Ersson was nagged by injuries throughout the season and Fedotov and Aleksei Kolosov's play forced head coach John Tortorella to return to Ersson more than the team planned on. Ersson finished the season with 47 games played and a record of 22–17–5 with a GAA of 3.14 and a save percentage of .883 with two shutouts. In the offseason, the Flyers signed free agent goaltender Daniel Vladař to help stabilize the position. Vladař won the team's starting role for the 2025–26 season with Ersson as his backup. Ersson's play continued to deteriorate as he was the poorest goaltender by statistical standards in the NHL at the Olympic break in the league schedule. Following the break his play improved and he helped the team make the 2026 Stanley Cup playoffs. He finished the regular season with a record of 14–11–5 in 33 games with a GAA of 3.12 and a save percentage of .870. He did not play in the playoffs as the team was eliminated by the Carolina Hurricanes in the second round.

=== Toronto Maple Leafs and Ottawa Senators ===
On 16 June 2026, Ersson was traded to the Toronto Maple Leafs, alongside defenceman Emil Andrae and a 2026 third-round pick, in exchange for defenceman Simon Benoit and goaltender Joseph Woll. Ten days later, the Maple Leafs traded Ersson to the Ottawa Senators, in exchange for a 2027 fifth-round pick. A restricted free agent, the Senators did not give him a qualifying offer, making him an unrestricted free agent. He later signed a two-year, $4.4 million contract with the Senators on 1 July.

== International play ==
Medal record

Men's ice hockey

Representing Sweden

World Championships
Bronze medal – third place	2024 Czechia	
Bronze medal – third place	2025 Sweden/Denmark	

At the junior level, Ersson represented Sweden at the 2019 World Junior Championships. He went 3–1–0 with a 2.23 GAA and a save percentage of .922.

He was part of the Swedish roster at the 2021 World Championship, but did not see any playing time. Ersson again represented Sweden at the 2024 World Championship, where he won a bronze medal as part of a tandem with Filip Gustavsson.

He was named to the Swedish 4 Nations Face-Off roster, replacing New Jersey Devils goaltender Jacob Markström. Ersson started in one game at the tournament, a 2–1 victory over the United States, where he made 32 saves against 33 shots.

== Career statistics ==
=== Regular season and playoffs ===
			Regular season									Playoffs
Season	Team	League	GP	W	L	OTL	MIN	GA	SO	GAA	SV%	GP	W	L	MIN	GA	SO	GAA	SV%
2016–17	Brynäs IF	J20	8	5	2	1	455	16	0	2.11	.932	—	—	—	—	—	—	—	—
2017–18	Brynäs IF	SHL	1	0	0	0	40	2	0	3.00	.882	—	—	—	—	—	—	—	—
2017–18	Brynäs IF	J20	23	16	7	0	1,380	58	1	2.52	.916	5	2	3	297	22	0	4.44	.857
2018–19	Västerås IK	Allsv	44	27	9	0	2,158	70	5	1.95	.933	—	—	—	—	—	—	—	—
2019–20	Brynäs IF	SHL	35	14	20	0	2,010	97	1	2.90	.895	—	—	—	—	—	—	—	—
2020–21	Brynäs IF	SHL	42	15	25	2	2,353	116	3	2.96	.910	—	—	—	—	—	—	—	—
2021–22	Lehigh Valley Phantoms	AHL	5	0	3	1	264	13	0	2.96	.893	—	—	—	—	—	—	—	—
2022–23	Lehigh Valley Phantoms	AHL	42	24	17	1	2,512	119	1	2.84	.900	3	1	2	194	12	0	3.71	.875
2022–23	Philadelphia Flyers	NHL	12	6	3	0	645	33	1	3.07	.899	—	—	—	—	—	—	—	—
2023–24	Philadelphia Flyers	NHL	51	23	19	7	2,809	132	4	2.82	.890	—	—	—	—	—	—	—	—
2024–25	Philadelphia Flyers	NHL	47	22	17	5	2,602	136	2	3.14	.883	—	—	—	—	—	—	—	—
2025–26	Philadelphia Flyers	NHL	33	14	11	5	1,867	97	0	3.12	.870	—	—	—	—	—	—	—	—
SHL totals			78	29	45	2	4,403	215	4	2.93	.904	—	—	—	—	—	—	—	—
NHL totals			143	65	50	17	7,923	398	7	3.01	.884	—	—	—	—	—	—	—	—

=== International ===
Year	Team	Event	Result	GP	W	L	T	MIN	GA	SO	GAA	SV%
2019	Sweden	WJC	5th	4	3	1	0	242	9	0	2.23	.922
2024	Sweden	WC	3rd place, bronze medalist(s)	4	3	1	0	208	5	0	1.44	.891
2025	Sweden	4NF	3rd	1	1	0	0	60	1	0	1.00	.970
2025	Sweden	WC	3rd place, bronze medalist(s)	5	4	0	0	259	5	2	1.16	.934
Junior totals				4	3	1	0	242	9	0	2.23	.922
Senior totals				10	8	1	0	527	11	2	1.25	.929
