= Bobby McMann =

Canadian ice hockey player (born 1996)

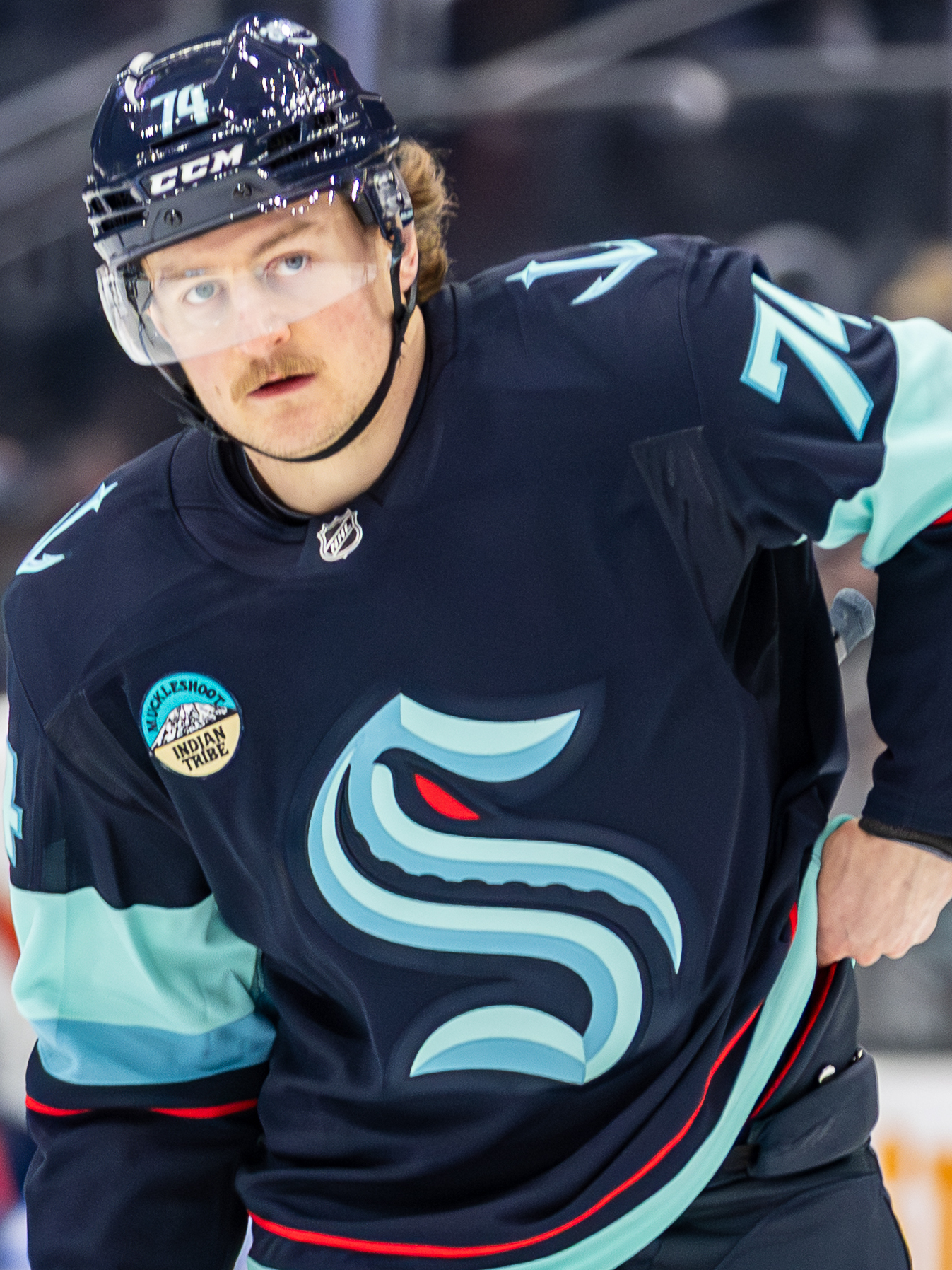
- McMann with the Seattle Kraken in 2026
- Born: June 15, 1996 (age 30) Wainwright, Alberta, Canada
- Height: 6 ft 2 in (188 cm)
- Weight: 209 lb (95 kg; 14 st 13 lb)
- Position: Winger
- Shoots: Left
- NHL team Former teams: Seattle Kraken; Toronto Maple Leafs
- NHL draft: Undrafted
- Playing career: 2020–present

Robert William Lucas McMann (born June 15, 1996) is a Canadian professional ice hockey player who is a winger for the Seattle Kraken of the National Hockey League (NHL). He previously played for the Toronto Maple Leafs.

== Playing career ==
While playing for the Bonnyville Pontiacs of the Alberta Junior Hockey League (AJHL), McMann committed to Colgate University of the National Collegiate Athletic Association (NCAA)'s ECAC Hockey division to play with the university's Raiders hockey club at the age of 20. In his final year with the Pontiacs, McMann was the recipient of the Pipeline AJHL Scholarship Award, awarded for 'leadership, sportsmanship, dedication and citizenship' to one member of each AJHL squad for use towards post-secondary education. Although first eligible to be drafted in the 2014 NHL entry draft while with the Raiders, McMann was never selected in an NHL draft.

McMann played four seasons with the Raiders, serving as alternate captain for his penultimate season and captain of the team during his final year, during which he was also nominated for the Hobey Baker Award. He was named to the NCAA's ECAC Third All-Star Team. After his college career, McMann signed a two-year contract with the Toronto Marlies of the American Hockey League (AHL).

Impacted by the COVID-19 pandemic, McMann's first professional season was split across the AHL and ECHL's Wichita Thunder, considered to be a level below the AHL. With the Thunder, McMann recorded 17 points in 18 games, while producing a modest 4 points in 21 games with the Marlies in a limited bottom-six forward role. In his sophomore season, at the age of 25, McMann established himself as a top-six forward in the Marlies lineup, appearing with the club for most of the 2021–22 season and earning a spot on the team's top power play unit. McMann would finish the season with 24 goals, establishing a new franchise record for most goals in a season by a rookie, surpassing Josh Leivo who recorded 23. (Note: Despite appearing in 21 games the previous season, McMann was still considered a rookie by AHL rules.) McMann was in a race with teammate and fellow rookie Alex Steeves for the second half of the season for the franchise rookie scoring title; Steeves would finish the campaign with 23. In reward for his play, the Toronto Maple Leafs, the Marlies' parent club and NHL affiliate, signed McMann to a two-year, entry-level contract worth slightly over league minimum.

The following season, McMann continued his strong play. After recording six points in three games to be named the AHL's Player of the Week for January 8, 2023 (for a collective season total of 15 points in 17 games played), McMann was recalled by the Maple Leafs on January 10, after placing defenceman T.J. Brodie on injury reserve. The following day, after Maple Leafs star centre Auston Matthews was held from the lineup from injury, McMann made his NHL debut in a contest against the Nashville Predators; in the process, he became the first Maple Leafs player to wear number 74. After eight games with the Maple Leafs, McMann was returned to the Marlies; he recorded one disallowed goal in his NHL stint in a depth role with the team's fourth line.

McMann missed part of the Maple Leafs' 2023–24 training camp due to a lingering lower-body injury he sustained the previous season. On October 10, 2023, he was placed on waivers, and was assigned to the Marlies after clearing. On November 11, he was recalled by the Maple Leafs, and recorded two assists in a 5–2 win over the Vancouver Canucks that same day. On December 16, McMann scored his first career NHL goal in a 7–0 win against the Pittsburgh Penguins. On February 13, 2024, McMann recorded his first career NHL hat-trick in a 4–1 win over the St. Louis Blues. On March 13, McMann was signed to a two-year contract extension by the Maple Leafs.

The Maple Leafs saw a setback during the 2025–26 season, remaining out of the post-season for most of the campaign. As the team sat largely out of playoff contention approaching the March 6, 2026 trade deadline, McMann's name was cited in several trade rumours given his admirable play and expiring contract. On the day of the deadline, McMann was traded to the Seattle Kraken in exchange for a second-round pick in the 2026 NHL Draft and a fourth-round pick in the 2027 NHL Draft. The Kraken, who were in the final playoff spot in the western conference at the time of the trade, collapsed in their final few months of the season, winning 7 of their final 23 games to miss the playoffs and finish sixth-last in the NHL. Despite this, McMann's play was complimented by media and fans with McMann scoring 10 goals and 14 points in his tenure with the Kraken.

== Personal life ==
McMann began skating at the age of two. While at Colgate University, McMann majored in economics and minored in theatre. As a student-athlete, McMann was a four-time ECAC Hockey All-Academic Team honouree.

== Career statistics ==
			Regular season					Playoffs
Season	Team	League	GP	G	A	Pts	PIM	GP	G	A	Pts	PIM
2012–13	Lloydminster Bobcats	AJHL	1	0	0	0	0	—	—	—	—	—
2013–14	Bonnyville Pontiacs	AJHL	54	11	11	22	22	3	0	0	0	0
2014–15	Bonnyville Pontiacs	AJHL	51	21	18	39	40	15	7	2	9	6
2015–16	Bonnyville Pontiacs	AJHL	47	36	32	68	40	4	0	3	3	2
2016–17	Colgate University	ECAC	35	5	14	19	12	—	—	—	—	—
2017–18	Colgate University	ECAC	40	14	16	30	20	—	—	—	—	—
2018–19	Colgate University	ECAC	36	8	15	23	32	—	—	—	—	—
2019–20	Colgate University	ECAC	34	10	10	20	58	—	—	—	—	—
2020–21	Wichita Thunder	ECHL	18	6	11	17	2	5	1	1	2	0
2020–21	Toronto Marlies	AHL	21	2	2	4	6	—	—	—	—	—
2021–22	Newfoundland Growlers	ECHL	4	2	2	4	8	—	—	—	—	—
2021–22	Toronto Marlies	AHL	61	24	11	35	16	—	—	—	—	—
2022–23	Toronto Marlies	AHL	30	21	8	29	16	—	—	—	—	—
2022–23	Toronto Maple Leafs	NHL	10	0	1	1	2	—	—	—	—	—
2023–24	Toronto Marlies	AHL	6	2	1	3	6	—	—	—	—	—
2023–24	Toronto Maple Leafs	NHL	56	15	9	24	52	—	—	—	—	—
2024–25	Toronto Maple Leafs	NHL	74	20	14	34	27	13	0	3	3	16
2025–26	Toronto Maple Leafs	NHL	60	19	13	32	40	—	—	—	—	—
2025–26	Seattle Kraken	NHL	18	10	4	14	2	—	—	—	—	—
NHL totals			218	64	41	105	123	13	0	3	3	16
