= Maxim Tsyplakov =

Russian ice hockey player (born 1998)

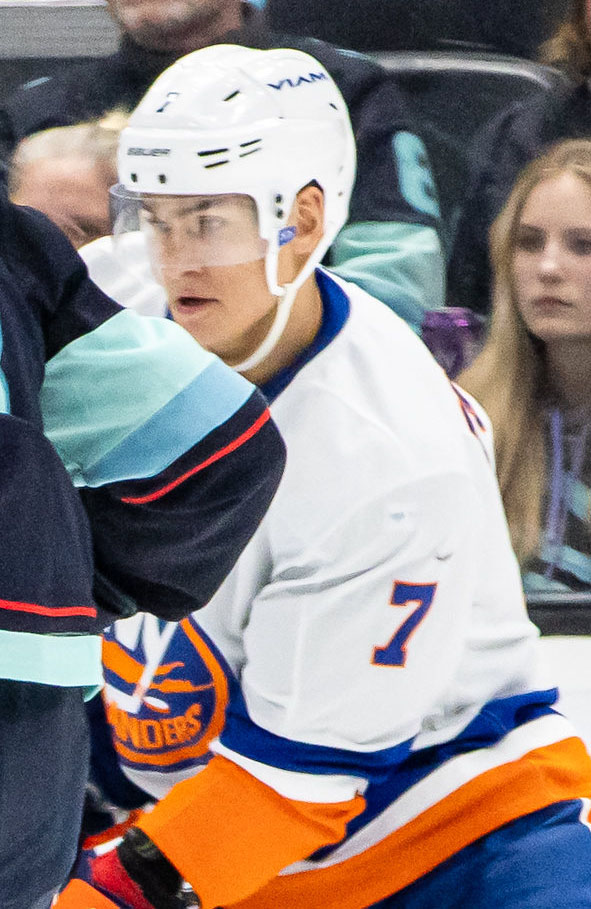
- Tsyplakov with the New York Islanders in November 2024
- Born: 19 September 1998 (age 28) Moscow, Russia
- Height: 6 ft 3 in (191 cm)
- Weight: 201 lb (91 kg; 14 st 5 lb)
- Position: Right wing
- Shoots: Left
- NHL team Former teams: Calgary Flames; Spartak Moscow; New York Islanders; New Jersey Devils
- NHL draft: Undrafted
- Playing career: 2016–present

Maxim Viktorovich Tsyplakov (Russian: Максим Викторович Цыплаков; born 19 September 1998) is a Russian professional ice hockey player who is a right winger for the Calgary Flames of the National Hockey League (NHL). He is the grandson of Victor Tsyplakov, who was inducted into the Russian and Soviet Hockey Hall of Fame in 1969.

== Playing career ==
Tsyplakov played as a junior within Spartak Moscow youth system and made his Kontinental Hockey League (KHL) debut with Spartak Moscow during the 2017–18 season.

In the 2023–24 season, his seventh in the KHL, Tsyplakov recorded career best offensive marks, finishing fourth in league goal scoring with 31 markers and 16 assists for 47 points through 65 regular season games.

As an undrafted free agent, Tsyplakov was signed to a one-year, entry-level contract with the New York Islanders of the National Hockey League (NHL) on 17 May 2024. In his rookie season with the Islanders in 2024–25, Tsyplakov was utilised in a top-nine forward role and netted 10 goals and 25 assists for 35 points in 77 regular season games. On 25 July 2025, Tsyplakov avoided arbitration in re-signing as a restricted free agent to a two-year, $4.5 million contract extension.

During the 2025–26 season, on 27 January 2026, Tsyplakov was traded to the New Jersey Devils in exchange for Ondřej Palát, a 2026 third-round pick, and a 2027 sixth-round pick. He made 22 appearances for the Devils, adding just a goal and an assist, to play out the campaign.

On 23 June 2026, Tsyplakov, along with Šimon Nemec, was traded to the Calgary Flames in exchange for two conditional first-round picks, a 2026 second-round pick and prospect Étienne Morin.

== Career statistics ==
			Regular season					Playoffs
Season	Team	League	GP	G	A	Pts	PIM	GP	G	A	Pts	PIM
2015–16	MHK Spartak	MHL	24	3	4	7	26	1	0	0	0	0
2016–17	MHK Spartak	MHL	34	7	9	16	24	3	1	1	2	2
2016–17	Khimik Voskresensk	VHL	11	1	3	4	4	—	—	—	—	—
2017–18	MHK Spartak	MHL	20	7	5	12	14	5	3	0	3	2
2017–18	Khimik Voskresensk	VHL	5	1	0	1	2	—	—	—	—	—
2017–18	Spartak Moscow	KHL	20	0	0	0	4	2	0	0	0	6
2018–19	Spartak Moscow	KHL	31	4	5	9	29	—	—	—	—	—
2018–19	Khimik Voskresensk	VHL	15	1	4	5	2	—	—	—	—	—
2018–19	MHK Spartak	MHL	5	1	0	1	2	2	0	0	0	0
2019–20	Spartak Moscow	KHL	52	5	6	11	18	5	0	2	2	4
2020–21	Spartak Moscow	KHL	58	9	8	17	32	4	0	0	0	4
2020–21	Khimik Voskresensk	VHL	1	0	0	0	0	2	0	1	1	2
2021–22	Spartak Moscow	KHL	38	4	8	12	28	5	0	1	1	4
2021–22	Khimik Voskresensk	VHL	1	0	0	0	4	4	2	2	4	2
2022–23	Spartak Moscow	KHL	63	10	15	25	26	—	—	—	—	—
2023–24	Spartak Moscow	KHL	65	31	16	47	35	11	2	2	4	14
2024–25	New York Islanders	NHL	77	10	25	35	39	—	—	—	—	—
2025–26	New York Islanders	NHL	27	1	1	2	6	—	—	—	—	—
2025–26	New Jersey Devils	NHL	22	1	1	2	0	—	—	—	—	—
KHL totals			327	63	58	121	172	27	2	5	7	32
NHL totals			126	12	27	39	45	—	—	—	—	—
