= Kiefer Sherwood =

American ice hockey player (born 1995)

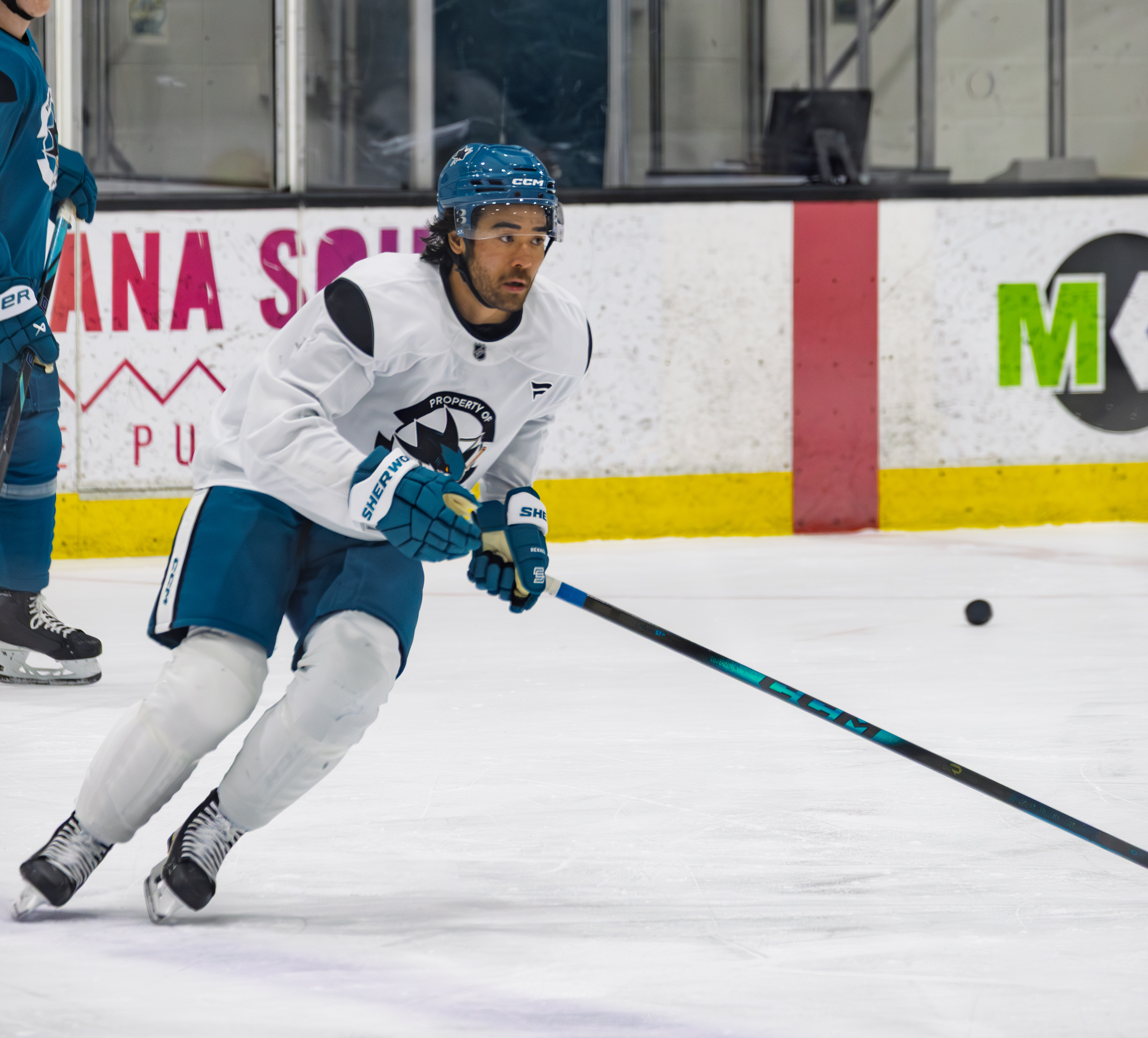
- Sherwood with the San Jose Sharks in 2026
- Born: March 31, 1995 (age 31) Columbus, Ohio, U.S.
- Height: 6 ft 0 in (183 cm)
- Weight: 195 lb (88 kg; 13 st 13 lb)
- Position: Forward
- Shoots: Right
- NHL team Former teams: San Jose Sharks; Anaheim Ducks; Colorado Avalanche; Nashville Predators; Vancouver Canucks
- NHL draft: Undrafted
- Playing career: 2018–present

Kiefer Sherwood (born March 31, 1995) is an American professional ice hockey player who is a forward for the San Jose Sharks of the National Hockey League (NHL).

== Playing career ==
Sherwood was selected in the seventh-round, 99th overall, by the Youngstown Phantoms in the 2012 USHL entry draft.

While Sherwood and his brother went undrafted to the NHL, they were both invited to the Columbus Blue Jackets 2015 development camp. Leaving without a contract, Sherwood began his freshman season at Miami University.

=== Anaheim Ducks ===
On March 20, 2018, Sherwood signed a two-year, entry-level contract with the Anaheim Ducks as an undrafted free agent after playing three years of college hockey at Miami University. Sherwood made the Ducks' 2018 opening night roster out of training camp. He made his NHL debut on October 4, where he recorded his first career NHL point to help the Ducks beat the San Jose Sharks 5–2. He recorded his first career NHL goal in a 5–3 loss to the Dallas Stars on October 13.

=== Colorado Avalanche ===
As an impending restricted free agent following the conclusion of his entry-level deal, Sherwood was not tendered a qualifying offer by the Ducks and was released to free agency on October 9, 2020. He was soon signed on the opening day of free agency to a one-year, two-way contract with the Colorado Avalanche, who then re-signed him to another one-year, two-way deal on July 22, 2021.

=== Nashville Predators ===
As a free agent again preceding the 2022–23 season, Sherwood was signed to a one-year, two-way contract with the Nashville Predators on July 14, 2022.

=== Vancouver Canucks ===
After playing in 68 games for the Predators and establishing himself as an NHL regular in the 2023–24 season, Sherwood signed a two-year, $3 million contract as a free agent with the Vancouver Canucks on July 1, 2024. He achieved his first NHL hat trick, which was a natural hat trick in a 3–1 win over the Avalanche on December 16, 2024. He scored the goals in each of the three periods, among them a shorthanded tally in the second period. By the end of the game, the Canucks' thirtieth of the season, Sherwood had already surpassed his career-high single-season goal total. On October 30, 2025, he scored a hat trick against the St. Louis Blues, scoring in each of the three periods to lead the Canucks to a 4–3 win in a shootout.

=== San Jose Sharks ===
On January 19, 2026, Sherwood was traded to the San Jose Sharks in exchange for Cole Clayton and second-round picks in 2026 and 2027. He signed a five-year contract extension on March 4, 2026.

== Personal life ==
Sherwood was born to Roger and Yuko in Columbus, Ohio, and is of half-Japanese descent. His younger brother Kole has also appeared in several NHL games.

== Career statistics ==
| | | | Regular season | | | | | Playoffs |
| Season | Team | League | GP | G | A | Pts | PIM | GP | G | A | Pts | PIM |
|---|---|---|---|---|---|---|---|---|---|---|---|---|
| 2010–11 | Ohio Blue Jackets 16U AAA | T1EHL | 37 | 13 | 11 | 24 | 18 | — | — | — | — | — |
| 2011–12 | Ohio Blue Jackets 16U AAA | T1EHL | 40 | 27 | 23 | 50 | 16 | — | — | — | — | — |
| 2012–13 | Ohio Blue Jackets 18U AAA | T1EHL | 34 | 28 | 19 | 47 | 10 | — | — | — | — | — |
| 2012–13 | U.S NTDP Juniors | USHL | 2 | 0 | 0 | 0 | 0 | — | — | — | — | — |
| 2012–13 | U.S. NTDP U18 | USDP | 4 | 0 | 0 | 0 | 0 | — | — | — | — | — |
| 2012–13 | Youngstown Phantoms | USHL | 9 | 0 | 2 | 2 | 4 | — | — | — | — | — |
| 2013–14 | Youngstown Phantoms | USHL | 55 | 13 | 19 | 32 | 31 | — | — | — | — | — |
| 2014–15 | Youngstown Phantoms | USHL | 60 | 29 | 27 | 56 | 26 | 4 | 1 | 1 | 2 | 14 |
| 2015–16 | Miami University | NCHC | 34 | 11 | 7 | 18 | 8 | — | — | — | — | — |
| 2016–17 | Miami University | NCHC | 36 | 14 | 24 | 38 | 20 | — | — | — | — | — |
| 2017–18 | Miami University | NCHC | 36 | 9 | 21 | 30 | 24 | — | — | — | — | — |
| 2017–18 | San Diego Gulls | AHL | 11 | 2 | 0 | 2 | 0 | — | — | — | — | — |
| 2018–19 | Anaheim Ducks | NHL | 50 | 6 | 6 | 12 | 8 | — | — | — | — | — |
| 2018–19 | San Diego Gulls | AHL | 29 | 6 | 12 | 18 | 12 | 16 | 4 | 4 | 8 | 20 |
| 2019–20 | San Diego Gulls | AHL | 37 | 16 | 7 | 23 | 8 | — | — | — | — | — |
| 2019–20 | Anaheim Ducks | NHL | 10 | 0 | 1 | 1 | 6 | — | — | — | — | — |
| 2020–21 | Colorado Avalanche | NHL | 16 | 0 | 3 | 3 | 0 | 2 | 0 | 1 | 1 | 0 |
| 2020–21 | Colorado Eagles | AHL | 10 | 10 | 6 | 16 | 8 | — | — | — | — | — |
| 2021–22 | Colorado Eagles | AHL | 57 | 36 | 39 | 75 | 34 | 8 | 4 | 6 | 10 | 17 |
| 2021–22 | Colorado Avalanche | NHL | 11 | 1 | 1 | 2 | 0 | — | — | — | — | — |
| 2022–23 | Nashville Predators | NHL | 32 | 7 | 6 | 13 | 30 | — | — | — | — | — |
| 2022–23 | Milwaukee Admirals | AHL | 42 | 22 | 16 | 38 | 22 | 14 | 4 | 7 | 11 | 14 |
| 2023–24 | Nashville Predators | NHL | 68 | 10 | 17 | 27 | 41 | 6 | 1 | 0 | 1 | 0 |
| 2024–25 | Vancouver Canucks | NHL | 78 | 19 | 21 | 40 | 35 | — | — | — | — | — |
| 2025–26 | Vancouver Canucks | NHL | 44 | 17 | 6 | 23 | 22 | — | — | — | — | — |
| 2025–26 | San Jose Sharks | NHL | 27 | 6 | 7 | 13 | 28 | — | — | — | — | — |
| NHL totals | | | 336 | 66 | 68 | 134 | 170 | 8 | 1 | 1 | 2 | 0 |

== Awards and honors ==
| Award | Year | Ref |
AHL
| Second All-Star Team | 2022 | |
Vancouver Canucks
| Fred J. Hume Award | 2025 | |
