= Cole Clayton =

Canadian ice hockey player (born 2000)

- Born: February 29, 2000 (age 26) Strathmore, Alberta, Canada
- Height: 6 ft 2 in (188 cm)
- Weight: 198 lb (90 kg; 14 st 2 lb)
- Position: Defence
- Shoots: Right
- NHL team (P) Cur. team: Vancouver Canucks; Abbotsford Canucks (AHL)
- NHL draft: Undrafted
- Playing career: 2021–present

Cole Clayton (born February 29, 2000) is a Canadian professional ice hockey defenceman currently playing for the Abbotsford Canucks of the American Hockey League (AHL) as a prospect for the Vancouver Canucks of the National Hockey League (NHL).

== Playing career ==
=== Junior ===
Clayton played major junior hockey in the Western Hockey League (WHL) for the Medicine Hat Tigers, appearing in 214 games from 2017 to 2021. In his final campaign during the shortened, Clayton served as an alternate captain and led all WHL defensemen in scoring, recording 9 goals and 30 points in just 23 games.

=== Professional ===
Undrafted into the NHL, Clayton turned professional ahead of the 2021–22 season. He spent the first four years of his professional career within the Columbus Blue Jackets organization, playing exclusively for their AHL affiliate, the Cleveland Monsters. During the 2024–25 season, Clayton recorded 5 goals and 18 assists for 23 points in 63 games, and was honored as Cleveland's team winner for the IOA/American Specialty AHL Man of the Year award for his community contributions.

On July 1, 2025, Clayton signed a one-year, two-way contract as a free agent with the San Jose Sharks. He began the 2025–26 season with San Jose's AHL affiliate, the San Jose Barracuda, tallying 5 points in 33 games.

On January 19, 2026, the Sharks traded Clayton, along with second-round picks in the 2026 and 2027 NHL drafts, to the Vancouver Canucks in exchange for forward Kiefer Sherwood. He was assigned to Vancouver's AHL affiliate, the Abbotsford Canucks. On March 5, 2026, the Vancouver Canucks recalled Clayton to the NHL roster on the eve of the league's trade deadline.

== Personal life ==
Growing up in Strathmore, Alberta, Clayton was a multi-sport athlete. Throughout his high school years, he regularly participated in rodeo events and played rugby during the hockey off-seasons.

== Career statistics ==
			Regular season					Playoffs
Season	Team	League	GP	G	A	Pts	PIM	GP	G	A	Pts	PIM
2015–16	Medicine Hat Tigers	WHL	4	0	1	1	4	—	—	—	—	—
2016–17	Fort McMurray Oil Barons	AJHL	2	0	0	0	0	—	—	—	—	—
2017–18	Medicine Hat Tigers	WHL	56	2	5	7	25	6	1	1	2	12
2018–19	Medicine Hat Tigers	WHL	68	4	16	20	51	6	0	0	0	0
2019–20	Medicine Hat Tigers	WHL	63	2	28	30	27	—	—	—	—	—
2020–21	Medicine Hat Tigers	WHL	23	9	21	30	22	—	—	—	—	—
2021–22	Cleveland Monsters	AHL	55	2	14	16	30	—	—	—	—	—
2022–23	Cleveland Monsters	AHL	47	4	6	10	43	—	—	—	—	—
2023–24	Cleveland Monsters	AHL	59	5	15	20	31	8	1	0	1	0
2024–25	Cleveland Monsters	AHL	63	1	14	15	37	6	0	0	0	12
2025–26	San Jose Barracuda	AHL	33	2	3	5	21	—	—	—	—	—
2025–26	Abbotsford Canucks	AHL	32	0	6	6	27	—	—	—	—	—
AHL totals			289	14	58	72	189	14	1	0	1	12
