= 2025 World Junior Ice Hockey Championships rosters =

Below are the rosters for teams competing in the 2025 World Junior Ice Hockey Championships.

== Group A ==
=== Canada ===
- Head coach: (Canada) Dave Cameron

Pos.	No.	Player	Team	League	NHL Rights
G	1	Jack Ivankovic	(Canada) Brampton Steelheads	(Canada) OHL	Nashville Predators
G	30	Carter George	(Canada) Owen Sound Attack	(Canada) OHL	Los Angeles Kings
G	31	Carson Bjarnason	(Canada) Brandon Wheat Kings	(Canada) WHL	Philadelphia Flyers
D	2	Andrew Gibson	(Canada) Sault Ste. Marie Greyhounds	(Canada) OHL	Nashville Predators
D	3	Sam Dickinson	(Canada) London Knights	(Canada) OHL	San Jose Sharks
D	4	Caden Price	(Canada) Kelowna Rockets	(Canada) WHL	Seattle Kraken
D	5	Oliver Bonk	(Canada) London Knights	(Canada) OHL	Philadelphia Flyers
D	6	Tanner Molendyk	(Canada) Saskatoon Blades	(Canada) WHL	Nashville Predators
D	7	Sawyer Mynio	(United States) Seattle Thunderbirds	(Canada) WHL	Vancouver Canucks
D	8	Beau Akey	(Canada) Barrie Colts	(Canada) OHL	Edmonton Oilers
D	25	Matthew Schaefer	(United States) Erie Otters	(Canada) OHL	New York Islanders
F	9	Gavin McKenna	(Canada) Medicine Hat Tigers	(Canada) WHL	
F	10	Bradly Nadeau	(United States) Chicago Wolves	(United States) AHL	Carolina Hurricanes
F	11	Brayden Yager	(Canada) Lethbridge Hurricanes	(Canada) WHL	Winnipeg Jets
F	12	Jett Luchanko	(Canada) Guelph Storm	(Canada) OHL	Philadelphia Flyers
F	13	Luca Pinelli	(Canada) Ottawa 67's	(Canada) OHL	Columbus Blue Jackets
F	14	Berkly Catton	(United States) Spokane Chiefs	(Canada) WHL	Seattle Kraken
F	16	Carson Rehkopf	(Canada) Brampton Steelheads	(Canada) OHL	Seattle Kraken
F	20	Ethan Gauthier	(Canada) Drummondville Voltigeurs	(Canada) QMJHL	Tampa Bay Lightning
F	21	Calum Ritchie	(Canada) Oshawa Generals	(Canada) OHL	New York Islanders
F	22	Porter Martone	(Canada) Brampton Steelheads	(Canada) OHL	Philadelphia Flyers
F	23	Tanner Howe	(Canada) Calgary Hitmen	(Canada) WHL	Pittsburgh Penguins
F	26	Cole Beaudoin	(Canada) Barrie Colts	(Canada) OHL	Utah Hockey Club
F	27	Easton Cowan	(Canada) London Knights	(Canada) OHL	Toronto Maple Leafs
F	28	Mathieu Cataford	(Canada) Rimouski Océanic	(Canada) QMJHL	Vegas Golden Knights

=== Finland ===
- Head coach: (Finland) Lauri Mikkola

Pos.	No.	Player	Club Team	League	NHL Rights
G	1	Kim Saarinen	(Finland) HPK Hämeenlinna	(Finland) Liiga	Seattle Kraken
G	30	Petteri Rimpinen	(Finland) Kiekko-Espoo	(Finland) Liiga	
G	31	Noa Vali	(Finland) TPS Turku	(Finland) Liiga	
D	2	Mitja Jokinen	(Finland) TPS Turku	(Finland) Liiga	
D	3	Kalle Kangas	(Finland) HPK Hämeenlinna	(Finland) Liiga	Pittsburgh Penguins
D	6	Sebastian Soini	(Finland) Ilves Tampere	(Finland) Liiga	Minnesota Wild
D	7	Daniel Nieminen	(Finland) Pelicans Lahti	(Finland) Liiga	
D	10	Emil Pieniniemi	(Canada) Kingston Frontenacs	(Canada) OHL	Pittsburgh Penguins
D	13	Veeti Väisänen	(Canada) Medicine Hat Tigers	(Canada) WHL	Utah Hockey Club
D	33	Aron Kiviharju	(Finland) HIFK Helsinki	(Finland) Liiga	Minnesota Wild
D	35	Arttu Tuhkala	(Sweden) Luleå HF	(Sweden) SHL	
F	12	Joona Saarelainen	(Finland) KalPa Kuopio	(Finland) Liiga	Tampa Bay Lightning
F	15	Tuomas Uronen	(Canada) Kingston Frontenacs	(Canada) OHL	Vegas Golden Knights
F	18	Rasmus Kumpulainen	(Finland) Pelicans Lahti	(Finland) Liiga	Minnesota Wild
F	19	Konsta Helenius	(United States) Rochester Americans	(United States) AHL	Buffalo Sabres
F	21	Topias Hynninen	(Finland) Mikkelin Jukurit	(Finland) Liiga	
F	22	Kasper Halttunen	(Canada) London Knights	(Canada) OHL	San Jose Sharks
F	23	Roope Vesterinen	(Finland) HPK Hämeenlinna	(Finland) Liiga	
F	24	Jesse Nurmi	(Canada) London Knights	(Canada) OHL	New York Islanders
F	27	Julius Miettinen	(United States) Everett Silvertips	(Canada) WHL	Seattle Kraken
F	28	Heikki Ruohonen	(United States) Dubuque Fighting Saints	(United States) USHL	Philadelphia Flyers
F	29	Arttu Alasiurua	(Finland) Kärpät Oulu	(Finland) Liiga	
F	32	Emil Hemming	(Canada) Barrie Colts	(Canada) OHL	Dallas Stars
F	37	Benjamin Rautiainen	(Finland) Tappara Tampere	(Finland) Liiga	
F	38	Jesse Kiiskinen	(Finland) HPK Hämeenlinna	(Finland) Liiga	Detroit Red Wings

=== Germany ===
- Head coach: (Germany) Tobias Abstreiter

Pos.	No.	Player	Club Team	League	NHL Rights
G	1	Nico Pertuch	(Germany) Ravensburg Towerstars	(Germany) DEL2	
G	29	Linus Vieillard	(Germany) Eisbären Juniors Berlin	(Germany) DNL	
G	30	Lennart Neiße	(Canada) Cambridge Redhawks	(Canada) GOJHL	
D	4	Max Hense	(Germany) Kölner Junghaie	(Germany) DNL	
D	5	Paul Mayer	(Germany) Heilbronner Falken	(Germany) DEL2	
D	6	Norwin Panocha	(United States) Green Bay Gamblers	(United States) USHL	Buffalo Sabres
D	7	Carlos Händel	(Canada) Halifax Mooseheads	(Canada) QMJHL	
D	16	Kilian Kühnhauser	(Germany) Löwen Frankfurt	(Germany) DEL	
D	17	Lua Niehus	(Germany) Kölner Haie	(Germany) DEL	
D	18	Rio Kaiser	(Germany) Eisbären Berlin	(Germany) DEL	
D	22	Edwin Tropmann	(Germany) EC Bad Nauheim	(Germany) DEL2	
F	8	Noah Samanski	(Canada) Powell River Kings	(Canada) BCHL	
F	9	Elias Pul	(Germany) Blue Devils Weiden	(Germany) DEL2	
F	10	Timo Ruckdäschel	(Germany) Grizzlys Wolfsburg	(Germany) DEL	
F	11	David Lewandowski	(Canada) Saskatoon Blades	(Canada) WHL	
F	14	Nick Maul	(Germany) ESV Kaufbeuren	(Germany) DEL2	
F	15	Lenny Boos	(Germany) Starbulls Rosenheim	(Germany) DEL2	
F	19	Marco Münzenberger	(Canada) Moncton Wildcats	(Canada) QMJHL	
F	20	Maxim Schäfer	(Austria) Red Bull Hockey Juniors	(Austria) AlpsHL	
F	21	Paul Vinzens	(Austria) Red Bull Hockey Juniors	(Austria) AlpsHL	
F	23	Linus Brandl	(Germany) EV Landshut	(Germany) DEL2	
F	24	Clemens Sager	(Germany) EC Kassel Huskies	(Germany) DEL2	
F	25	Tobias Schwarz	(Germany) EV Landshut	(Germany) DEL2	
F	26	Julius Sumpf	(Canada) Moncton Wildcats	(Canada) QMJHL	
F	27	Simon Seidl	(Germany) EV Landshut	(Germany) DEL2	

=== Latvia ===
- Head coach: (Latvia) Artis Ābols

Pos.	No.	Player	Club Team	League	NHL Rights
G	1	Aksels Ozols	(Latvia) HK Zemgale/LBTU	(Latvia) LAT	
G	29	Linards Feldbergs	(Canada) Sherbrooke Phoenix	(Canada) QMJHL	
G	30	Jānis Fecers	(Denmark) Herning Blue Fox	(Denmark) DEN	
D	2	Krišjānis Sārts	(United States) St. Cloud Norsemen	(United States) NAHL	
D	3	Viktors Kurbaka	(Czech Republic) Oceláři Třinec	(Czech Republic) ELH	
D	6	Emīls Šķeltiņš	(United States) Amarillo Wranglers	(United States) NAHL	
D	10	Harijs Cjunskis	(Canada) Rouyn-Noranda Huskies	(Canada) QMJHL	
D	15	Darels Uļjanskis	(Sweden) AIK IF	(Sweden) HA	Anaheim Ducks
D	16	Pēteris Bulāns	(Canada) Chicoutimi Sagueneens	(Canada) QMJHL	
D	25	Krists Retenais	(United States) Aberdeen Wings	(United States) NAHL	
D	26	Oskars Briedis	(Latvia) HK Zemgale/LBTU	(Latvia) LAT	
F	7	Davids Livšics	(Finland) RoKi	(Finland) Mestis	
F	9	Ēriks Mateiko	(Canada) Saint John Sea Dogs	(Canada) QMJHL	Washington Capitals
F	11	Dmitrijs Diļevka	(United States) Watertown Shamrocks	(United States) USPHL	
F	12	Toms Mots	(Latvia) HK Zemgale/LBTU	(Latvia) LAT	
F	13	Martins Klaucāns	(United States) St. Cloud Norsemen	(United States) NAHL	
F	14	Olivers Mūrnieks	(United States) Sioux City Musketeers	(United States) USHL	
F	17	Rūdolfs Bērzkalns	(United States) Muskegon Lumberjacks	(United States) USHL	
F	18	Roberts Naudiņš	(United States) Shattuck-St. Mary's	(United States) UMHSEHL	
F	19	Bruno Osmanis	(Sweden) IF Björklöven	(Sweden) HA	
F	21	Rauls Ozollapa	(Czech Republic) HC ZUBR Přerov	(Czech Republic) Maxa Liga	
F	22	Valdis Dommers	(Czech Republic) Mountfield HK	(Czech Republic) ELH	
F	23	Antons Macijevskis	(United States) Watertown Shamrocks	(United States) NAHL	
F	24	Daniels Serkins	(Switzerland) SC Bern Future	(Switzerland) SUI	
F	27	Markuss Sieradzkis	(Sweden) IF Björklöven	(Sweden) HA	

=== United States ===
- Head coach: (United States) David Carle

Pos.	No.	Player	Team	League	NHL Rights
G	1	Trey Augustine	(United States) Michigan State University	(United States) B1G	Detroit Red Wings
G	30	Hampton Slukynsky	(United States) Western Michigan University	(United States) NCHC	Los Angeles Kings
G	31	Sam Hillebrandt	(Canada) Barrie Colts	(Canada) OHL	
D	3	Logan Hensler	(United States) University of Wisconsin	(United States) B1G	
D	4	Colin Ralph	(United States) St. Cloud State University	(United States) NCHC	St. Louis Blues
D	5	Drew Fortescue	(United States) Boston College	(United States) HE	New York Rangers
D	6	Adam Kleber	(United States) University of Minnesota Duluth	(United States) NCHC	Buffalo Sabres
D	14	Aram Minnetian	(United States) Boston College	(United States) HE	Dallas Stars
D	16	Paul Fischer	(United States) University of Notre Dame	(United States) B1G	Edmonton Oilers
D	24	Cole Hutson	(United States) Boston University	(United States) HE	Washington Capitals
D	28	Zeev Buium	(United States) University of Denver	(United States) NCHC	Minnesota Wild
F	2	Teddy Stiga	(United States) Boston College	(United States) HE	Nashville Predators
F	8	Brandon Svoboda	(United States) Boston University	(United States) HE	San Jose Sharks
F	9	Ryan Leonard	(United States) Boston College	(United States) HE	Washington Capitals
F	10	Carey Terrance	(United States) Erie Otters	(United States) OHL	Anaheim Ducks
F	11	Oliver Moore	(United States) University of Minnesota	(United States) B1G	Chicago Blackhawks
F	12	James Hagens	(United States) Boston College	(United States) HE	
F	17	Danny Nelson	(United States) University of Notre Dame	(United States) B1G	New York Islanders
F	19	Trevor Connelly	(United States) Providence College	(United States) HE	Vegas Golden Knights
F	20	Joey Willis	(United States) Saginaw Spirit	(United States) OHL	Nashville Predators
F	22	Max Plante	(United States) University of Minnesota Duluth	(United States) NCHC	Detroit Red Wings
F	23	Austin Burnevik	(United States) St. Cloud State University	(United States) NCHC	Anaheim Ducks
F	34	Gabe Perreault	(United States) Boston College	(United States) HE	New York Rangers
F	74	Brodie Ziemer	(United States) University of Minnesota	(United States) B1G	Buffalo Sabres
F	91	Cole Eiserman	(United States) Boston University	(United States) HE	New York Islanders

== Group B ==
=== Czechia ===
- Head coach: (Czech Republic) Patrik Augusta

Pos.	No.	Player	Club Team	League	NHL Rights
G	1	Jan Kavan	(Czech Republic) LHK Jestřábi Prostějov	(Czech Republic) Maxa Liga	
G	2	Jakub Milota	(Canada) Cape Breton Eagles	(Canada) QMJHL	Nashville Predators
G	30	Michael Hrabal	(United States) University of Massachusetts Amherst	(United States) HE	Utah Hockey Club
D	3	Vojtěch Port	(Canada) Lethbridge Hurricanes	(Canada) WHL	Anaheim Ducks
D	4	Marek Ročák	(Canada) Kelowna Rockets	(Canada) WHL	
D	5	Adam Jiříček	(Canada) Brantford Bulldogs	(Canada) OHL	St. Louis Blues
D	6	Jakub Dvořák	(United States) Ontario Reign	(United States) AHL	Los Angeles Kings
D	7	Jakub Fibigr	(Canada) Brampton Steelheads	(Canada) OHL	Seattle Kraken
D	9	Vojtěch Husinecký	(Czech Republic) Piráti Chomutov	(Czech Republic) Maxa Liga	
D	23	Tomáš Galvas	(Czech Republic) Bílí Tygři Liberec	(Czech Republic) ELH	
D	26	Matteo Kočí	(Canada) Kamloops Blazers	(Canada) WHL	
F	10	Adam Jecho	(Canada) Edmonton Oil Kings	(Canada) WHL	St. Louis Blues
F	11	Pavel Šimek	(Canada) Rimouski Océanic	(Canada) QMJHL	
F	12	Eduard Šalé	(United States) Coachella Valley Firebirds	(United States) AHL	Seattle Kraken
F	14	Adam Židlický	(Canada) Brampton Steelheads	(Canada) OHL	
F	15	Vojtěch Čihař	(Czech Republic) HC Energie Karlovy Vary	(Czech Republic) ELH	
F	17	Petr Sikora	(Czech Republic) HC Oceláři Třinec	(Czech Republic) ELH	Washington Capitals
F	18	Matěj Maštalířský	(Czech Republic) HC Litvínov	(Czech Republic) ELH	
F	19	Ondřej Kos	(Finland) Ilves	(Finland) Liiga	St. Louis Blues
F	20	Dominik Petr	(Canada) Brandon Wheat Kings	(Canada) WHL	
F	21	Jakub Štancl	(Canada) Kelowna Rockets	(Canada) WHL	St. Louis Blues
F	22	Vojtěch Hradec	(Czech Republic) BK Mladá Boleslav	(Czech Republic) ELH	Utah Hockey Club
F	24	Adam Novotný	(Czech Republic) Mountfield HK	(Czech Republic) ELH	
F	25	Jiří Felcman	(Switzerland) SCL Tigers	(Switzerland) NL	Chicago Blackhawks
F	28	Miroslav Holinka	(Canada) Edmonton Oil Kings	(Canada) WHL	Toronto Maple Leafs

=== Kazakhstan ===
- Head coach: (Kazakhstan) Sergei Starygin

Pos.	No.	Player	Club Team	League	NHL Rights
G	20	Danil Lytkin	(Kazakhstan) Snezhnye Barsy Astana	(Kazakhstan) MHL	
G	55	Vladimir Nikitin	(Kazakhstan) Snezhnye Barsy Astana	(Kazakhstan) MHL	Ottawa Senators
G	72	Jokhar Dudarkiyev	(Kazakhstan) Snezhnye Barsy Astana	(Kazakhstan) MHL	
D	4	Roman Boľshedvorsky	(Kazakhstan) Snezhnye Barsy Astana	(Kazakhstan) MHL	
D	6	Mstislav Shipilin	(Kazakhstan) Snezhnye Barsy Astana	(Kazakhstan) MHL	
D	8	Sanzhar Ibragim	(Kazakhstan) Snezhnye Barsy Astana	(Kazakhstan) MHL	
D	9	Danial Shakshakbayev	(Kazakhstan) Snezhnye Barsy Astana	(Kazakhstan) MHL	
D	17	Aslan Zhusupbekov	(Kazakhstan) Snezhnye Barsy Astana	(Kazakhstan) MHL	
D	18	Gleb Resheťko	(Kazakhstan) Snezhnye Barsy Astana	(Kazakhstan) MHL	
D	19	Beibarys Orazov	(Kazakhstan) Barys Astana	(Kazakhstan) KHL	
D	48	Danila Belyakov	(Kazakhstan) Torpedo Ust-Kamenogorsk	(Kazakhstan) KHC	
F	10	Abzal Alibek	(United States) Philadelphia Rebels	(United States) NAHL	
F	11	Asanali Sarkenov	(United States) Spokane Chiefs	(Canada) WHL	
F	13	Vladimir Korchagin	(Kazakhstan) Snezhnye Barsy Astana	(Kazakhstan) MHL	
F	15	Artur Gross	(Kazakhstan) Snezhnye Barsy Astana	(Kazakhstan) MHL	
F	26	Alexander Kim	(United States) Bismarck Bobcats	(United States) NAHL	
F	29	Kirill Lyapunov	(Kazakhstan) Snezhnye Barsy Astana	(Kazakhstan) MHL	
F	39	Davlat Nurkenov	(Finland) HC Ässät Pori	(Finland) Liiga	
F	57	Adil Beisembayev	(Kazakhstan) Snezhnye Barsy Astana	(Kazakhstan) MHL	
F	66	Yegor Levkovets	(Kazakhstan) Nomad Astana	(Kazakhstan) KHC	
F	70	Semyon Simonov	(Kazakhstan) Snezhnye Barsy Astana	(Kazakhstan) MHL	
F	77	Asanali Ruslanuly	(Kazakhstan) Snezhnye Barsy Astana	(Kazakhstan) MHL	
F	78	Alexander Migunov	(Kazakhstan) Snezhnye Barsy Astana	(Kazakhstan) MHL	
F	88	Kirill Kankin	(Kazakhstan) Snezhnye Barsy Astana	(Kazakhstan) MHL	
F	98	Nikita Sitnikov	(Kazakhstan) Snezhnye Barsy Astana	(Kazakhstan) MHL	

=== Slovakia ===
- Head coach: (Slovakia) Ivan Fenes

Pos.	No.	Player	Club Team	League	NHL Rights
G	1	Alan Lenďák	(United States) Fargo Force	(United States) USHL	
G	2	Michal Pradel	(Slovakia) HC Banská Bystrica	(Slovakia) Slovak Extraliga	
G	30	Samuel Urban	(United States) Sioux City Musketeers	(United States) USHL	
D	3	Milan Pišoja	(Slovakia) HK Dukla Michalovce	(Slovakia) Slovak Extraliga	
D	4	Maxim Štrbák	(United States) Michigan State University	(United States) B1G	Buffalo Sabres
D	5	Richard Baran	(United States) Des Moines Buccaneers	(United States) USHL	
D	6	Jakub Chromiak	(Canada) Kitchener Rangers	(Canada) OHL	
D	20	Peter Valent	(Canada) Quebec Remparts	(Canada) QMJHL	
D	23	Samuel Barcik	(Slovakia) HK Spišská Nová Ves	(Slovakia) Slovak Extraliga	
D	26	Luka Radivojevič	(United States) Muskegon Lumberjacks	(United States) USHL	
D	28	Tomáš Královič	(Slovakia) HC Slovan Bratislava	(Slovakia) Slovak Extraliga	
F	8	Matúš Vojtech	(Slovakia) HK 32 Liptovský Mikuláš	(Slovakia) Slovak Extraliga	
F	10	Tomáš Poběžal	(Slovakia) HK Nitra	(Slovakia) Slovak Extraliga	
F	11	Lukáš Klečka	(Sweden) Södertälje SK	(Sweden) HockeyAllsvenskan	
F	12	Peter Císar	(United States) Fargo Force	(United States) USHL	
F	13	Tobias Tomík	(Slovakia) HK Dukla Trenčín	(Slovakia) Slovak Extraliga	
F	14	Miroslav Šatan Jr.	(United States) Sioux Falls Stampede	(United States) USHL	Washington Capitals
F	15	Dalibor Dvorský	(United States) Springfield Thunderbirds	(United States) AHL	St. Louis Blues
F	16	Roman Kukumberg	(Slovakia) HC Slovan Bratislava	(Slovakia) Slovak Extraliga	
F	17	Daniel Jenčko	(United States) University of Massachusetts Amherst	(United States) HE	
F	18	Juraj Pekarčík	(Canada) Moncton Wildcats	(Canada) QMJHL	St. Louis Blues
F	22	František Dej	(Slovakia) HK Dukla Trenčín	(Slovakia) Slovak Extraliga	
F	24	Adam Cedzo	(Czech Republic) HC Frýdek-Místek	(Czech Republic) Maxa Liga	
F	25	Ján Chovan	(Finland) Tappara	(Finland) Liiga	
F	27	Róbert Fedor	(Slovakia) HK Dukla Michalovce	(Slovakia) Slovak Extraliga	

=== Sweden ===
- Head coach: (Sweden) Magnus Hävelid

Pos.	No.	Player	Team	League	NHL Rights
G	1	Marcus Gidlöf	(Sweden) Leksands IF	(Sweden) SHL	New York Islanders
G	30	Melvin Strahl	(United States) Youngstown Phantoms	(United States) USHL	Columbus Blue Jackets
G	35	Melker Thelin	(Sweden) IF Björklöven	(Sweden) HA	Utah Hockey Club
D	2	Rasmus Bergqvist	(Sweden) Skellefteå AIK	(Sweden) SHL	Montreal Canadiens
D	4	Axel Sandin-Pellikka	(Sweden) Skellefteå AIK	(Sweden) SHL	Detroit Red Wings
D	5	Wilhelm Hallquisth	(Sweden) HV71	(Sweden) SHL	
D	6	Axel Hurtig	(Canada) Calgary Hitmen	(Canada) WHL	Calgary Flames
D	7	Viggo Gustafsson	(Sweden) Timrå IK	(Sweden) SHL	Nashville Predators
D	9	Theo Lindstein	(Sweden) Brynäs IF	(Sweden) SHL	St. Louis Blues
D	24	Tom Willander	(United States) Boston University	(United States) HE	Vancouver Canucks
F	11	Zeb Forsfjäll	(Sweden) Skellefteå AIK	(Sweden) SHL	Seattle Kraken
F	12	Isac Hedqvist	(Sweden) Luleå HF	(Sweden) SHL	
F	14	Linus Eriksson	(Sweden) Djurgårdens IF	(Sweden) HA	Florida Panthers
F	15	David Edstrom	(Sweden) Frölunda HC	(Sweden) SHL	Nashville Predators
F	16	Felix Unger Sörum	(United States) Chicago Wolves	(United States) AHL	Carolina Hurricanes
F	17	Felix Nilsson	(Sweden) Rögle BK	(Sweden) SHL	Nashville Predators
F	18	Victor Eklund	(Sweden) Djurgårdens IF	(Sweden) HA	New York Islanders
F	20	Dennis Altörn	(Sweden) Leksands IF	(Sweden) SHL	
F	21	Herman Träff	(Sweden) HV71	(Sweden) SHL	New Jersey Devils
F	22	Anton Wahlberg	(United States) Rochester Americans	(United States) AHL	Buffalo Sabres
F	25	Otto Stenberg	(Sweden) Malmö Redhawks	(Sweden) SHL	St. Louis Blues
F	26	Noel Nordh	(Canada) Sault Ste. Marie Greyhounds	(Canada) OHL	Utah Hockey Club
F	27	David Granberg	(Sweden) Luleå HF	(Sweden) SHL	
F	28	Oskar Vuollet	(Sweden) Skellefteå AIK	(Sweden) SHL	Carolina Hurricanes

=== Switzerland ===
- Head coach: (Switzerland) Marcel Jenni

Pos.	No.	Player	Club Team	League	NHL Rights
G	1	Christian Kirsch	(United States) Janesville Jets	(United States) NAHL	San Jose Sharks
G	29	Ewan Huet	(Canada) Regina Pats	(Canada) WHL	
G	30	Elijah Neuenschwander	(Switzerland) Fribourg-Gottéron	(Switzerland) NL	
D	7	Timo Bünzli	(Switzerland) ZSC Lions	(Switzerland) NL	
D	9	Nic Balestra	(Switzerland) EV Zug	(Switzerland) NL	
D	14	Nils Rhyn	(Switzerland) EHC Basel	(Switzerland) SL	
D	16	Aris Häfliger	(Switzerland) GDT Bellinzona Snakes	(Switzerland) SL	
D	21	Ludvig Johnson	(Switzerland) EV Zug	(Switzerland) NL	
D	23	Leon Muggli	(Switzerland) EV Zug	(Switzerland) NL	Washington Capitals
D	25	Basile Sansonnens	(Canada) Rimouski Océanic	(Canada) QMJHL	Vancouver Canucks
D	26	Eric Schneller	(Switzerland) Genève-Servette HC	(Switzerland) NL	
D	28	Daniil Ustinkov	(Switzerland) GCK Lions	(Switzerland) SL	
F	3	Jonah Neuenschwander	(Switzerland) EHC Biel-Bienne	(Switzerland) NL	
F	5	Leo Braillard	(Canada) Lethbridge Hurricanes	(Canada) WHL	
F	6	Jamiro Reber	(Sweden) HV71	(Sweden) SHL	
F	8	Rico Gredig	(Switzerland) HC Davos	(Switzerland) NL	New York Rangers
F	10	Jan Dorthe	(Switzerland) HC Fribourg-Gottéron	(Switzerland) NL	
F	11	Rafael Meier	(Switzerland) EHC Kloten	(Switzerland) NL	
F	12	Kimo Gruber	(Switzerland) GCK Lions	(Switzerland) SL	
F	15	Lars Steiner	(Canada) Rouyn-Noranda Huskies	(Canada) QMJHL	
F	17	Loris Wey	(Switzerland) EV Zug	(Switzerland) NL	
F	18	Robin Nico Antenen	(Switzerland) EV Zug	(Switzerland) NL	
F	19	Endo Meier	(Switzerland) GCK Lions	(Switzerland) SL	
F	22	Andro Kaderli	(Sweden) Leksands IF	(Sweden) SHL	
F	24	Alain Graf	(Switzerland) SC Bern	(Switzerland) NL	
F	27	Simon Meier	(Canada) Penticton Vees	(Canada) BCHL	
