= 2024 World Junior Ice Hockey Championships rosters =

Below are the rosters for teams competing in the 2024 World Junior Ice Hockey Championships. Player NHL rights are accurate as of the tournament.

== Group A ==
=== Canada ===
- Head coach: (Canada) Alan Letang

Pos.	No.	Player	Team	League	NHL Rights
G	1	Scott Ratzlaff	(United States) Seattle Thunderbirds	(Canada) WHL	Buffalo Sabres
G	30	Mathis Rousseau	(Canada) Halifax Mooseheads	(Canada) QMJHL	
G	31	Samuel St-Hilaire	(Canada) Sherbrooke Phoenix	(Canada) QMJHL	
D	3	Jake Furlong	(Canada) Halifax Mooseheads	(Canada) QMJHL	San Jose Sharks
D	4	Noah Warren	(Canada) Victoriaville Tigres	(Canada) QMJHL	Anaheim Ducks
D	5	Oliver Bonk	(Canada) London Knights	(Canada) OHL	Philadelphia Flyers
D	7	Jorian Donovan	(Canada) Brantford Bulldogs	(Canada) OHL	Ottawa Senators
D	13	Maveric Lamoureux	(Canada) Drummondville Voltigeurs	(Canada) QMJHL	Arizona Coyotes
D	23	Ty Nelson	(Canada) North Bay Battalion	(Canada) OHL	Seattle Kraken
D	24	Denton Mateychuk	(Canada) Moose Jaw Warriors	(Canada) WHL	Columbus Blue Jackets
F	8	Owen Beck	(Canada) Peterborough Petes	(Canada) OHL	Montreal Canadiens
F	9	Nate Danielson	(Canada) Brandon Wheat Kings	(Canada) WHL	Detroit Red Wings
F	12	Fraser Minten	(Canada) Saskatoon Blades	(Canada) WHL	Toronto Maple Leafs
F	15	Matthew Poitras	(United States) Boston Bruins	(Canada) NHL	Boston Bruins
F	17	Macklin Celebrini	(United States) Boston University	(United States) HE	
F	18	Matthew Wood	(United States) University of Connecticut	(United States) HE	Nashville Predators
F	20	Carson Rehkopf	(Canada) Kitchener Rangers	(Canada) OHL	Seattle Kraken
F	21	Owen Allard	(Canada) Sault Ste. Marie Greyhounds	(Canada) OHL	
F	22	Jordan Dumais	(Canada) Halifax Mooseheads	(Canada) QMJHL	Columbus Blue Jackets
F	26	Matthew Savoie	(United States) Wenatchee Wild	(Canada) WHL	Buffalo Sabres
F	27	Easton Cowan	(Canada) London Knights	(Canada) OHL	Toronto Maple Leafs
F	28	Conor Geekie	(United States) Wenatchee Wild	(Canada) WHL	Arizona Coyotes
F	29	Brayden Yager	(Canada) Moose Jaw Warriors	(Canada) WHL	Pittsburgh Penguins

=== Finland ===
- Head coach: (Finland) Lauri Mikkola

Pos.	No.	Player	Team	League	NHL Rights
G	1	Eemil Vinni	(Finland) JoKP	(Finland) Mestis	
G	30	Nikke Kokko	(Finland) Oulun Kärpät	(Finland) Liiga	Seattle Kraken
G	31	Noa Vali	(Finland) TPS	(Finland) Liiga	
D	3	Otto Salin	(Finland) HIFK	(Finland) Liiga	Los Angeles Kings
D	4	Arttu Kärki	(Canada) Sault Ste. Marie Greyhounds	(Canada) OHL	Vegas Golden Knights
D	6	Kasper Kulonummi	(Finland) Tappara	(Finland) Liiga	Nashville Predators
D	10	Emil Pieniniemi	(Finland) Oulun Kärpät	(Finland) Liiga	Pittsburgh Penguins
D	12	Joona Väisänen	(United States) Dubuque Fighting Saints	(United States) USHL	
D	13	Kalle Kangas	(Finland) Jokerit	(Finland) Mestis	Pittsburgh Penguins
D	15	Jesse Pulkkinen	(Finland) JYP Jyväskylä	(Finland) Liiga	
F	18	Rasmus Kumpulainen	(Canada) Oshawa Generals	(Canada) OHL	Minnesota Wild
F	19	Konsta Helenius	(Finland) Mikkelin Jukurit	(Finland) Liiga	
F	20	Oiva Keskinen	(Finland) Tappara	(Finland) Liiga	Columbus Blue Jackets
F	21	Samu Bau	(Finland) Ilves	(Finland) Liiga	Arizona Coyotes
F	22	Kasper Halttunen	(Canada) London Knights	(Canada) OHL	San Jose Sharks
F	24	Aleksanteri Kaskimäki	(Finland) HIFK	(Finland) Liiga	St. Louis Blues
F	25	Max Koskipirtti	(United States) Michigan Technological University	(United States) CCHA	
F	28	Jere Lassila	(Finland) JYP Jyväskylä	(Finland) Liiga	
F	29	Lenni Hämeenaho	(Finland) Porin Ässät	(Finland) Liiga	New Jersey Devils
F	32	Emil Hemming	(Finland) TPS	(Finland) Liiga	
F	33	Jani Nyman	(Finland) Ilves	(Finland) Liiga	Seattle Kraken
F	34	Tommi Männistö	(United States) Michigan State University	(United States) B1G	
F	36	Janne Naukkarinen	(Finland) SaiPa	(Finland) Liiga	

=== Germany ===
- Head coach: (Germany) Tobias Absteiter

Pos.	No.	Player	Team	League	NHL Rights
G	1	Matthias Bittner	(Germany) Krefeld Pinguine	(Germany) DEL	
G	20	Philipp Dietl	(Germany) EV Landshut	(Germany) DEL2	
G	30	Nico Pertuch	(Germany) Ravensburg Towerstars	(Germany) DEL2	
D	3	Lua Niehus (Note: Due to injury, Lua Niehus was replaced by Paul Mayer on 27 December.)	(Germany) Löwen Frankfurt	(Germany) DEL	
D	4	Phillip Sinn	(Austria) Red Bull Hockey Juniors	(Austria) AlpsHL	
D	5	Paul Mayer	(Germany) Adler Mannheim	(Germany) DEL	
D	6	Michael Reich	(Germany) EV Landshut	(Germany) DEL2	
D	7	Samuel Schindler	(Germany) Bayreuth Tigers	(Germany) Oberliga	
D	22	Jakob Weber	(Germany) EHC Red Bull München	(Germany) DEL	
D	27	Niklas Hubner	(Germany) Ravensburg Towerstars	(Germany) DEL2	
D	28	Norwin Panocha	(Canada) Chicoutimi Sagueneens	(Canada) QMJHL	Buffalo Sabres
F	8	Julian Lutz	(United States) Green Bay Gamblers	(United States) USHL	Arizona Coyotes
F	12	Vadim Schreiner	(Austria) Red Bull Hockey Juniors	(Austria) AlpsHL	
F	13	Veit Oswald	(Germany) EHC Red Bull München	(Germany) DEL	
F	14	Kevin Bicker	(Germany) Löwen Frankfurt	(Germany) DEL	Detroit Red Wings
F	16	Ralf Rollinger	(Germany) Ravensburg Towerstars	(Germany) DEL2	
F	17	Daniel Assavolyuk	(Austria) Red Bull Hockey Juniors	(Austria) AlpsHL	
F	18	Luca Hauf	(United States) Seattle Thunderbirds	(Canada) WHL	
F	19	Eric Hordler	(Germany) Eisbären Berlin	(Germany) DEL	
F	21	Julius Sumpf	(Canada) Moncton Wildcats	(Canada) QMJHL	
F	23	Linus Brandl	(Germany) EV Landshut	(Germany) DEL2	
F	24	Roman Kechter	(Germany) Nürnberg Ice Tigers	(Germany) DEL	
F	25	Lennard Nieleck	(Germany) Hammer Eisbären	(Germany) Oberliga	
F	26	Moritz Elias	(Germany) Augsburger Panther	(Germany) DEL	

=== Latvia ===
- Head coach: (Latvia) Artis Abols

Pos.	No.	Player	Team	League	NHL Rights
G	1	Deivs Rolovs	(United States) Lone Star Brahmas	(United States) NAHL	
G	29	Linards Feldbergs	(Latvia) HS Rīga	(Latvia) LAT	
G	30	Aksels Ozols	(Canada) Charlottetown Islanders	(Canada) QMJHL	
D	2	Kristers Urbanovičs	(Finland) Oulun Kärpät	(Finland) Liiga	
D	3	Viktors Kurbaka	(Czech Republic) Ocelari Trinec	(Czech Republic) CZE	
D	4	Niks Feņenko	(Canada) Baie-Comeau Drakkar	(Canada) QMJHL	
D	5	Ingus Ločmelis	(United States) Fairbanks Ice Dogs	(United States) NAHL	
D	6	Darels Uļjanskis	(Sweden) AIK IF	(Sweden) SWE-2	
D	16	Pēteris Bulāns	(Canada) Chicoutimi Sagueneens	(Canada) QMJHL	
D	18	Renarts Bērziņš	(Latvia) HK Mogo	(Latvia) LAT	
F	7	Rainers Rullers	(United States) Madison Capitols	(United States) USHL	
F	8	Rinalds Vutkevičs	(Latvia) HK Zemgale/LBTU	(Latvia) LAT	
F	9	Ēriks Mateiko	(Canada) Saint John Sea Dogs	(Canada) QMJHL	
F	10	Emīls Veckaktiņš	(Switzerland) HC Lugano	(Switzerland) NL	
F	11	Dans Ločmelis	(United States) University of Massachusetts	(United States) HE	Boston Bruins
F	12	Toms Mots	(Czech Republic) Kometa Brno	(Czech Republic) CZE	
F	14	Rainers Dārziņš	(Sweden) Skellefteå AIK	(Sweden) SHL	
F	17	Dāvis Borozinskis	(United States) Des Moines Buccaneers	(United States) USHL	
F	20	Kristofers Krūmiņš	(United States) New Jersey Titans	(United States) NAHL	
F	21	Rauls Ozollapa	(Czech Republic) HC ZUBR Přerov	(Czech Republic) CZE-2	
F	22	Sandis Vilmanis	(Canada) Sarnia Sting	(Canada) OHL	Florida Panthers
F	23	Rodžers Bukarts	(United States) Wenatchee Wild	(Canada) WHL	
F	27	Kevins Strādnieks	(Latvia) HK Zemgale/LBTU	(Latvia) LAT	

=== Sweden ===
- Head coach: (Sweden) Magnus Hävelid

Pos.	No.	Player	Team	League	NHL Rights
G	1	Kevin Reidler	(United States) Dubuque Fighting Saints	(United States) USHL	Ottawa Senators
G	30	Melker Thelin	(Sweden) IF Björklöven	(Sweden) SWE-2	Arizona Coyotes
G	35	Hugo Hävelid	(Sweden) Djurgårdens IF	(Sweden) SWE-2	
D	2	Elias Pettersson	(Sweden) Örebro HK	(Sweden) SHL	Vancouver Canucks
D	3	Elias Salomonsson	(Sweden) Skellefteå AIK	(Sweden) SHL	Winnipeg Jets
D	4	Axel Sandin Pellikka	(Sweden) Skellefteå AIK	(Sweden) SHL	Detroit Red Wings
D	5	Mattias Hävelid	(Sweden) Linköping HC	(Sweden) SHL	San Jose Sharks
D	6	Anton Johansson	(Sweden) Leksands IF	(Sweden) SHL	Detroit Red Wings
D	8	Jakob Norén	(Sweden) Mora IK	(Sweden) SWE-2	
D	9	Theo Lindstein	(Sweden) Brynäs IF	(Sweden) SWE-2	St. Louis Blues
D	24	Tom Willander	(United States) Boston University	(United States) HE	Vancouver Canucks
F	10	Fabian Wagner	(Sweden) Linköping HC	(Sweden) SHL	Winnipeg Jets
F	11	Isac Born	(Sweden) Frölunda HC	(Sweden) SHL	
F	12	Noah Östlund	(Sweden) Växjö Lakers	(Sweden) SHL	Buffalo Sabres
F	15	David Edstrom	(Sweden) Frölunda HC	(Sweden) SHL	Vegas Golden Knights
F	16	Felix Unger Sörum	(Sweden) Leksands IF	(Sweden) SHL	Carolina Hurricanes
F	18	Filip Bystedt	(Sweden) Linköping HC	(Sweden) SHL	San Jose Sharks
F	19	Rasmus Rudslätt	(Sweden) AIK IF	(Sweden) SWE-2	
F	20	Liam Öhgren	(Sweden) Färjestad BK	(Sweden) SHL	Minnesota Wild
F	21	Zeb Forsfjäll	(Sweden) Skellefteå AIK	(Sweden) SHL	Seattle Kraken
F	22	Anton Wahlberg	(Sweden) Malmö Redhawks	(Sweden) SHL	Buffalo Sabres
F	23	Jonathan Lekkerimäki	(Sweden) Örebro HK	(Sweden) SHL	Vancouver Canucks
F	25	Otto Stenberg	(Sweden) Frölunda HC	(Sweden) SHL	St. Louis Blues
F	27	Oskar Pettersson	(Sweden) Rögle BK	(Sweden) SHL	Ottawa Senators

== Group B ==
=== Czechia ===
- Head coach: (Czech Republic) Patrik Augusta

Pos.	No.	Player	Team	League	NHL Rights
G	1	Jakub Vondraš	(Canada) Sudbury Wolves	(Canada) OHL	Carolina Hurricanes
G	2	Michael Schnattinger	(Czech Republic) HC Bílí Tygři Liberec	(Czech Republic) CZE	
G	30	Michael Hrabal	(United States) University of Massachusetts	(United States) HE	Arizona Coyotes
D	5	Adam Jiřiček (Note: Due to injury, Adam Jiřiček was replaced by Adam Židlický on 27 December.)	(Czech Republic) HC Škoda Plzeň	(Czech Republic) Czech Extraliga	
D	6	Aleš Čech	(Czech Republic) BK Mladá Boleslav	(Czech Republic) Czech Extraliga	
D	7	Tomáš Cibulka	(Canada) Val-d'Or Foreurs	(Canada) QMJHL	
D	9	Tomáš Hamara	(Canada) Brantford Bulldogs	(Canada) OHL	Ottawa Senators
D	26	Matteo Kočí	(Canada) Kamloops Blazers	(Canada) WHL	
D	27	Marek Alscher	(United States) Portland Winterhawks	(Canada) WHL	Florida Panthers
F	10	Adam Bareš	(Finland) Lahti Pelicans	(Finland) Liiga	
F	11	Matěj Přibyl	(Czech Republic) HC Vítkovice Ridera	(Czech Republic) CZE	
F	12	Dominik Rymon	(United States) Everett Silvertips	(Canada) WHL	
F	14	Adam Židlický	(Canada) Mississauga Steelheads	(Canada) OHL	
F	15	Jakub Hujer	(Canada) Rimouski Océanic	(Canada) QMJHL	
F	16	Matyáš Melovský	(Canada) Baie-Comeau Drakkar	(Canada) QMJHL	
F	17	Sebastián Redlich	(Sweden) Södertälje SK J20	(Sweden) J20 Nationell	
F	18	Matěj Maštalířský (Note: Due to injury, Robin Sapoušek was replaced by Matěj Maštalířský on 31 December.)	(Czech Republic) HC Litvínov	(Czech Republic) CZE	
F	19	Ondřej Becher	(Canada) Prince George Cougars	(Canada) WHL	
F	20	Robin Sapoušek	(Canada) Victoria Royals	(Canada) WHL	
F	21	Jakub Štancl	(Sweden) Växjö Lakers	(Sweden) SHL	St. Louis Blues
F	24	Matyáš Šapovaliv	(United States) Saginaw Spirit	(Canada) OHL	Vegas Golden Knights
F	25	Jiří Kulich	(United States) Rochester Americans	(United States) AHL	Buffalo Sabres
F	28	Eduard Šalé	(Canada) Barrie Colts	(Canada) OHL	Seattle Kraken

=== Norway ===
- Head coach: (Finland) Christer Nylund

Pos.	No.	Player	Team	League	NHL Rights
G	1	Markus Stensrud	(Norway) Storhamar Hockey	(Norway) NOR	
G	30	Sebastian Aarsund	(Sweden) Linköping HC	(Sweden) SHL	
G	35	Martin Lundberg	(Sweden) Mora IK	(Sweden) SWE-2	
D	3	Ludvig Lafton	(Norway) Frisk Asker	(Norway) NOR	
D	4	Christopher Lie	(Sweden) Malmö Redhawks	(Sweden) SWE	
D	5	Gabriel Koch	(Norway) Vålerenga Ishockey	(Norway) NOR	
D	8	Tobias Larsen	(Sweden) Färjestad BK	(Sweden) SWE	
D	10	Stian Solberg	(Norway) Vålerenga Ishockey	(Norway) NOR	
D	14	Emil Wasenden	(Norway) Frisk Asker	(Norway) NOR	
D	26	Mathias Papuga	(Norway) Storhamar Hockey	(Norway) NOR	
F	9	Mats Bakke Olsen	(Sweden) Malmö Redhawks	(Sweden) SWE	
F	11	Alieu Bah	(Sweden) Brynäs IF	(Sweden) SWE-2	
F	12	Noah Steen	(Sweden) Mora IK	(Sweden) SWE-2	
F	13	Petter Vesterheim	(Sweden) Mora IK	(Sweden) SWE-2	
F	15	Patrik Dalen	(Sweden) Mora IK	(Sweden) SWE-2	
F	17	Sander Wold	(Canada) Gatineau Olympiques	(Canada) QMJHL	
F	18	Martin Johnsen	(Norway) Storhamar Hockey	(Norway) NOR	
F	20	Casper Haugen	(Canada) Victoria Royals	(Canada) WHL	
F	21	Kasper Magnussen	(United States) Bemidji State University	(United States) CCHA	
F	22	Johannes Løkkeberg	(Canada) West Kelowna Warriors	(Canada) BCHL	
F	23	Felix Granath	(Sweden) Frölunda HC	(Sweden) SHL	
F	24	Oskar Bakkevig	(Sweden) Malmö Redhawks	(Sweden) SWE	
F	28	Michael Brandsegg-Nygård	(Sweden) Mora IK	(Sweden) SWE-2	

=== Slovakia ===
- Head coach: (Slovakia) Ivan Feneš

Pos.	No.	Player	Team	League	NHL Rights
G	1	Rastislav Eliáš	(Finland) HIFK U20	(Finland) U20 SM-sarja	
G	29	Samuel Urban	(United States) Sioux City Musketeers	(United States) USHL	
G	30	Adam Gajan	(United States) Green Bay Gamblers	(United States) USHL	Chicago Blackhawks
D	3	Milan Pišoja	(Slovakia) HK Dukla Michalovce	(Slovakia) SVK	
D	4	Maxim Štrbák	(United States) Michigan State University	(United States) B1G	Buffalo Sabres
D	5	Dávid Nátny	(Slovakia) MHk 32 Liptovský Mikuláš	(Slovakia) SVK	
D	6	Jozef Kmec	(Canada) Prince George Cougars	(Canada) WHL	
D	8	Marián Moško	(United States) Cornell University	(United States) ECAC	
D	11	Luka Radivojevič	(Sweden) Örebro HK J20	(Sweden) J20 Nationell	
D	26	Boris Žabka	(Slovakia) HC '05 Banská Bystrica	(Slovakia) SVK	
F	9	Adam Žlnka	(United States) Waterloo Black Hawks	(United States) USHL	Arizona Coyotes
F	10	Filip Mešár	(Canada) Kitchener Rangers	(Canada) OHL	Montreal Canadiens
F	13	František Dej	(Canada) Sherbrooke Phoenix	(Canada) QMJHL	
F	14	Adam Sýkora	(United States) Hartford Wolf Pack	(United States) AHL	New York Rangers
F	15	Dalibor Dvorský	(Canada) Sudbury Wolves	(Canada) OHL	St. Louis Blues
F	16	Roman Kukumberg (Note: Due to injury, Alex Šotek was replaced by Roman Kukumberg on 29 December.)	(Canada) Sarnia Sting	(Canada) OHL	
F	18	Servác Petrovský	(Canada) Owen Sound Attack	(Canada) OHL	Minnesota Wild
F	19	Juraj Pekarčík	(United States) Dubuque Fighting Saints	(United States) USHL	St. Louis Blues
F	20	Martin Mišiak	(United States) Erie Otters	(Canada) OHL	Chicago Blackhawks
F	21	Peter Repčík	(Canada) Drummondville Voltigeurs	(Canada) QMJHL	
F	22	Alex Čiernik (Note: Due to injury, Alex Čiernik was replaced by Peter Císar on 1 January.)	(Sweden) Västerviks IK	(Sweden) SWE-2	Philadelphia Flyers
F	23	Peter Císar	(United States) Fargo Force	(United States) USHL	
F	25	Markus Suchý	(Slovakia) HK Poprad	(Slovakia) SVK	
F	27	Samuel Honzek	(Canada) Vancouver Giants	(Canada) WHL	Calgary Flames
F	28	Alex Šotek	(Slovakia) HK Poprad	(Slovakia) SVK	

=== Switzerland ===
- Head coach: (Switzerland) Marcel Jenni

Pos.	No.	Player	Team	League	NHL Rights
G	1	Lorin Gruter	(Switzerland) ZSC Lions	(Switzerland) NL	
G	29	Alessio Beglieri	(Switzerland) EHC Biel	(Switzerland) NL	
G	30	Ewan Huet	(Canada) Regina Pats	(Canada) WHL	
D	3	Daniil Ustinkov	(Switzerland) ZSC Lions	(Switzerland) NL	
D	4	Rodwin Dionicio	(United States) Saginaw Spirit	(Canada) OHL	Anaheim Ducks
D	7	Timo Bunzli	(Switzerland) ZSC Lions	(Switzerland) NL	
D	14	Louis Füllemann (Note: Due to injury, Louis Füllemann was replaced by Jan Hornecker on 31 December.)	(Switzerland) SC Bern	(Switzerland) NL	
D	15	Gael Christe	(Switzerland) EHC Biel	(Switzerland) NL	
D	23	Leon Muggli	(Switzerland) EV Zug	(Switzerland) NL	
D	26	Simone Terraneo	(Switzerland) HC Ambri-Piotta	(Switzerland) NL	
D	28	Nick Meile (Note: Due to injury, Matteo Wagner was replaced by Nick Meile on 31 December.)	(Switzerland) SC Bern	(Switzerland) NL	
F	5	Leo Braillard	(Canada) Lethbridge Hurricanes	(Canada) WHL	
F	6	Jamiro Reber	(Sweden) HV71	(Sweden) SHL	
F	8	Rico Gredig	(Switzerland) HC Davos	(Switzerland) NL	
F	9	Thierry Schild	(Switzerland) SC Bern	(Switzerland) NL	
F	10	Jonas Taibel	(Switzerland) SC Rapperswil-Jona	(Switzerland) NL	
F	12	Mattheo Reinhard	(Switzerland) EHC Biel	(Switzerland) NL	
F	13	Timo Jenni	(Switzerland) SCL Tigers Langnau	(Switzerland) NL	
F	16	Jan Hornecker	(Switzerland) SC Rapperswil-Jona	(Switzerland) NL	
F	17	Miles Muller	(Canada) Moncton Wildcats	(Canada) QMJHL	
F	18	Julien Rod	(Switzerland) HC Fribourg-Gottéron	(Switzerland) NL	
F	20	Matteo Wagner	(Sweden) AIK IF	(Sweden) SWE-2	
F	22	Gregory Weber	(Switzerland) SC Bern	(Switzerland) NL	
F	25	Endo Meier	(Switzerland) ZSC Lions	(Switzerland) NL	
F	27	Simon Meier	(Canada) Penticton Vees	(Canada) BCHL	

=== United States ===
- Head coach: (United States) David Carle

Pos.	No.	Player	Team	League	NHL Rights
G	1	Trey Augustine	(United States) Michigan State University	(United States) B1G	Detroit Red Wings
G	29	Jacob Fowler	(United States) Boston College	(United States) HE	Montreal Canadiens
G	30	Sam Hillebrandt	(Canada) Barrie Colts	(Canada) OHL	
D	5	Drew Fortescue	(United States) Boston College	(United States) HE	New York Rangers
D	8	Sam Rinzel	(United States) University of Minnesota	(United States) B1G	Chicago Blackhawks
D	20	Lane Hutson	(United States) Boston University	(United States) HE	Montreal Canadiens
D	23	Eric Pohlkamp	(United States) Bemidji State University	(United States) CCHA	San Jose Sharks
D	26	Seamus Casey	(United States) University of Michigan	(United States) B1G	New Jersey Devils
D	28	Zeev Buium	(United States) University of Denver	(United States) NCHC	
D	71	Ryan Chesley	(United States) University of Minnesota	(United States) B1G	Washington Capitals
F	2	Rutger McGroarty	(United States) University of Michigan	(United States) B1G	Winnipeg Jets
F	4	Gavin Brindley	(United States) University of Michigan	(United States) B1G	Columbus Blue Jackets
F	6	Will Smith	(United States) Boston College	(United States) HE	San Jose Sharks
F	9	Ryan Leonard	(United States) Boston College	(United States) HE	Washington Capitals
F	11	Oliver Moore	(United States) University of Minnesota	(United States) B1G	Chicago Blackhawks
F	16	Quinn Finley	(United States) University of Wisconsin	(United States) B1G	New York Islanders
F	17	Danny Nelson	(United States) University of Notre Dame	(United States) B1G	New York Islanders
F	19	Cutter Gauthier	(United States) Boston College	(United States) HE	Philadelphia Flyers
F	22	Isaac Howard	(United States) Michigan State University	(United States) B1G	Tampa Bay Lightning
F	27	Gavin Hayes	(United States) Flint Firebirds	(Canada) OHL	Chicago Blackhawks
F	34	Gabe Perreault	(United States) Boston College	(United States) HE	New York Rangers
F	81	Jimmy Snuggerud	(United States) University of Minnesota	(United States) B1G	St. Louis Blues
F	91	Frank Nazar	(United States) University of Michigan	(United States) B1G	Chicago Blackhawks
