= Arttu Alasiurua =

- Born: February 5, 2005 (age 21) Kiiminki, Finland
- Height: 182 cm (6 ft 0 in)
- Weight: 78 kg (172 lb; 12 st 4 lb)
- Position: Centre/left wing
- Shoots: Left
- Liiga team Former teams: HC Ässät Pori; Oulun Kärpät
- Playing career: 2024–present

Arttu Alasiurua (born February 5, 2005) is a Finnish ice hockey forward, who plays for HC Ässät of the Finnish Elite League. He plays as a centre and left winger. Alasiurua won the silver medal at the IIHF WJC in 2025 with Finland.

== Career ==
Alasiurua started playing hockey at the age of four at the Oulun Kärpät. However, he spent his early years with Kiimingin Kiekko-Pojat. Alasiurua returned to Oulun Kärpät at the D2 level in 2017. He served as the alternate captain of the club's U16 team in the 2020–2021 season. Alasiurua was his team's top scorer and goal scorer with 17 goals and 35 total points.

In December 2021, Alasiurua signed a three-year professional contract with Kärpät, lasting until spring 2025. He played for the majority of the 2022–2023 season in the club's U20 team. With 16 goals, Alasiurua shared second place in the team's goal tally with Eerik Kantola, behind Joonas Lohisalo. He also played with Kärpät U18 in the playoffs. In the second final match on April 1, 2023, away against Rauman Lukko, he received the second assist for Emil Pienieniemi's 1–2 winning goal for Kärpät, which secured the Finnish championship for the team.

Alasiurua also started the 2023–2024 season in the Kärpät U20 team, where he played most of the season. Alasiurua was the team's top scorer and passer with 62 points, which tied him for third place in the U20 SM-sarja points table with KooKoo's Simo Heinonen and Tappara's Benjamin Rautiainen, behind JYP's Santeri Huovila and KooKoo's Verneri Ahonen. Alasiurua was awarded the Jere Lehtinen Award as the gentleman player of the league and was selected to the second all-star team. In December 2023, Kärpät loaned Alasiurua to the Mestis team Kokkolan Hermes on a contract until the end of the year. There he played five games with 3 points. Alasiurua also played his first two Liiga games in Kärpät, recording one assist. He made his league debut on 13 January 2024 against HIFK, when Noel Gunler was sidelined. Alasiurua was assigned to the right wing of Kärpät's second line alongside Connor Bunnaman and Julius Junttila. The game went to a penalty shootout, where Alasiurua was given the opportunity to try to score as Kärpät's third shooter. He was the only player to score, securing Kärpät a 3–2 victory.

In the 2024–2025 season, Alasiurua scored the first goal of his professional career on 18 October 2024 against KalPa. In total, he played 45 regular season matches during his rookie season, scoring 10 points. Alasiurua also played one regular season and playoff match for the Kärpät U20 team. In November 2024, he signed a contract extension with the club until spring 2027. In January 2026, Kärpät and Alasiurua mutually terminated their contract, as Alasiurua could not find a suitable role for him at the club. On the same day, he transferred to HC Ässät Pori on a contract until the end of the 2027–28 season.

== International play ==
Alasiurua won bronze with Finland at the Hlinka Gretzky Cup in 2022. He played at the 2023 IIHF U18 World Championship and the 2025 IIHF World Junior Championship, where he won silver.
