= Viggo Gustafsson =

Swedish ice hockey player (born 2006)

- Born: 11 September 2006 (age 20) Tingsryd, Sweden
- Height: 6 ft 2 in (188 cm)
- Weight: 194 lb (88 kg; 13 st 12 lb)
- Position: Defence
- Shoots: Left
- NHL team (P) Cur. team Former teams: Nashville Predators; Milwaukee Admirals (AHL); HV71; Timrå IK
- NHL draft: 77th overall, 2024; Nashville Predators
- Playing career: 2024–present

Viggo Gustafsson (born 11 September 2006) is a Swedish professional ice hockey defenceman currently playing for the Milwaukee Admirals of the American Hockey League (AHL) as a prospect to the Nashville Predators of the National Hockey League (NHL). Johansson was drafted 77th overall by the Predators in the 2024 NHL entry draft.

== Playing career ==
Gustafsson made his Swedish Hockey League debut with HV71 during the 2024–25 SHL season, going scoreless in 8 games. During that season, he was also loaned to fellow SHL club Timrå IK, where he registered 1 goal and 1 assist in 14 games.

On 5 March 2026, Gustafsson was signed to a three-year, entry-level contract with the Nashville Predators beginning from the 2026–27 season.

== International play ==
Medal record

Representing Sweden

Ice hockey

World Junior Championships
Gold medal – first place	2026 United States	

World U18 Championships
Bronze medal – third place	2024 Finland	

In December 2025, he was selected to represent Sweden at the 2026 World Junior Ice Hockey Championships. Gustafsson went scoreless in two games and won a gold medal. This was Sweden's first gold medal at the IIHF World Junior Championship since 2012.

== Career statistics ==
=== Regular season and playoffs ===
			Regular season					Playoffs
Season	Team	League	GP	G	A	Pts	PIM	GP	G	A	Pts	PIM
2022–23	HV71	J18	16	1	8	9	14	7	1	2	3	6
2022–23	HV71	J20	6	0	0	0	4	—	—	—	—	—
2023–24	HV71	J18	3	1	4	5	0	5	1	2	3	6
2023–24	HV71	J20	41	3	16	19	44	2	0	0	0	4
2024–25	HV71	J20	16	2	14	16	12	—	—	—	—	—
2024–25	HV71	SHL	8	0	0	0	2	—	—	—	—	—
2024–25	Timrå IK	SHL	14	1	1	2	0	—	—	—	—	—
2024–25	AIK IF	Allsv	7	0	1	1	4	18	1	8	9	4
2025–26	AIK IF	Allsv	40	0	8	8	28	6	0	1	1	2
2025–26	Milwaukee Admirals	AHL	6	1	1	2	6	2	0	0	0	0
SHL totals			22	1	1	2	2	—	—	—	—	—

=== International ===
Year	Team	Event	Result	GP	G	A	Pts	PIM
2022	Sweden	U17	5th	6	0	1	1	6
2024	Sweden	U18	3rd place, bronze medalist(s)	7	0	1	1	10
2025	Sweden	WJC	4th	7	0	3	3	10
2026	Sweden	WJC	1st place, gold medalist(s)	2	0	0	0	0
Junior totals				22	0	5	5	26
