= Aron Kiviharju =

Danish-Finnish ice hockey player

- Born: 25 January 2006 (age 20) Esbjerg, Denmark
- Height: 175 cm (5 ft 9 in)
- Weight: 77.1 kg (170 lb; 12 st 2 lb)
- Position: Defence
- Shoots: Left
- Liiga team Former teams: HIFK; TPS
- NHL draft: 122nd overall, 2024; Minnesota Wild
- Playing career: 2022–present

Aron Kiviharju (born 25 January 2006) is a Danish-born Finnish ice hockey defenceman for HIFK of the Liiga. Formerly considered one of the top prospects in his draft class, a major injury which caused him to miss most of his draft year season significantly dampened his scouting consensus.

== Playing career ==
The Dubuque Fighting Saints drafted Kiviharju as the 147th pick in the 2022 United States Hockey League (USHL) Futures Draft. Despite this, he continued to play with Finnish club HC TPS for the 2022–23 season. Kiviharju made his professional debut at only 16 years old in the second round of the Champions Hockey League on 4 September 2022 against EV Zug, lining up as TPS's seventh defender. Kiviharju had 13:47 minutes of ice time in the match, ending in a 4–0 loss. He made his SM-liiga debut in the opening round of the regular season on 13 September, an away game against Tappara. He finished the SM-liiga season with three points, all assists, in 21 games.

For the 2023–24 season Kiviharju left TPS for HIFK. He would only appear in seven games in the season, due to a knee injury that required surgery. In his limited sample, he recorded a goal and an assist. Once perceived as a top prospect, the injury and concerns about his size saw his projection slide to the tail end of the first round or later. His final ranking from NHL Central Scouting was eighth among European skaters.

On 11 March 2025, Kiviharju signed a two-year contract extension with HIFK.

== International play ==
Medal record

Ice hockey

Representing Finland

World Junior Championships
Silver medal – second place	2025 Canada	

World U18 Championship
Bronze medal – third place	2022 Germany	

At the 2024 World U18 Championship, not quite healed from surgery six months earlier to repair a dislocated kneecap, Kiviharju recorded three assists in five games and led Team Finland with a 21:54 average ice time.

== Personal life ==
Aron "Arska" Kiviharju was born in Esbjerg, Denmark, while his father, Jani, was playing with EfB Ishockey. He grew up in Raisio, Finland.

== Career statistics ==
			Regular season					Playoffs
Season	Team	League	GP	G	A	Pts	PIM	GP	G	A	Pts	PIM
2021–22	HC TPS	U20 SM-sarja	35	7	23	30	8	6	1	3	4	0
2022–23	HC TPS	U20 SM-sarja	22	2	18	20	8	8	1	5	6	2
2022–23	HC TPS	Liiga	21	0	3	3	2	—	—	—	—	—
2023–24	HIFK	Liiga	7	1	1	2	0	—	—	—	—	—
2024–25	HIFK	Liiga	52	4	12	16	12	4	0	0	0	0
Liiga totals			80	5	16	21	14	4	0	0	0	0

=== International ===
Year	Team	Event	Result	GP	G	A	Pts	PIM
2022	Finland	U18	3rd place, bronze medalist(s)	6	0	6	6	0
2022	Finland	HG18	3rd place, bronze medalist(s)	5	1	5	6	0
2023	Finland	U18	5th	5	0	7	7	0
2024	Finland	U18	5th	5	0	3	3	2
2025	Finland	WJC	2nd place, silver medalist(s)	7	0	3	3	2
Junior totals				28	1	24	25	4
