= Sawyer Mynio =

- Born: April 30, 2005 (age 21) Kamloops, British Columbia, Canada
- Height: 185 cm (6 ft 1 in)
- Weight: 78.5 kg (173 lb; 12 st 5 lb)
- Position: Defenceman
- Shoots: Left
- NHL team (P) Cur. team: Vancouver Canucks; Abbotsford Canucks (AHL)
- NHL draft: 89th overall, 2023; Vancouver Canucks
- Playing career: 2024–present

Sawyer Mynio (born April 30, 2005) is a Canadian professional ice hockey defenceman currently playing for the Abbotsford Canucks in the American Hockey League (AHL) while under contract with the Vancouver Canucks of the National Hockey League (NHL). Mynio was drafted by the Vancouver Canucks in the 2023 NHL entry draft.

== Early life ==
Sawyer Mynio was born on April 30, 2005, in Kamloops, British Columbia.

== Playing career ==
=== Junior ===
Mynio played minor hockey at the Yale Hockey Academy before being drafted by the Seattle Thunderbirds in the 2020 WHL Draft. During the 2022–23 season, Mynio was a shut-down defender for a Thunderbirds team that won the Ed Chynoweth Cup as WHL champions and reached the final of the 2023 Memorial Cup. In 2023–24, he was named to the WHL U.S. Division Second All-Star Team.

On January 4, 2025, Mynio was traded to the Calgary Hitmen. In exchange for Mynio, the Thunderbirds received players Sawyer Mayes and Linden Burrett, along with four draft picks, including two first round picks.

=== Professional ===
The Vancouver Canucks signed Mynio to a three year, entry level contract on September 24, 2023. In the 2023-24 season, Mynio made his professional debut with the Abbotsford Canucks after his WHL team was eliminated from playoffs. In 2024–25, he joined the Abbotsford Canucks for their postseason run and was a member of the squad that won the Calder Cup. Mynio joined the Abbotsford Canucks full-time for the 2025–26 season.

=== International play ===
Mynio was named to Team Canada for the 2025 World Junior Ice Hockey Championships. He appeared in three games, recording one assist.

== Career statistics ==
=== Regular season and playoffs ===
			Regular season					Playoffs
Season	Team	League	GP	G	A	Pts	PIM	GP	G	A	Pts	PIM
2021–22	Seattle Thunderbirds	WHL	47	4	7	11	22	21	0	0	0	4
2022–23	Seattle Thunderbirds	WHL	68	5	26	31	40	19	1	3	4	6
2023–24	Seattle Thunderbirds	WHL	63	16	37	53	66	—	—	—	—	—
2023–24	Abbotsford Canucks	AHL	1	0	0	0	0	—	—	—	—	—
2024–25	Seattle Thunderbirds	WHL	18	5	14	19	22	—	—	—	—	—
2024–25	Calgary Hitmen	WHL	31	9	17	26	44	11	0	6	6	6
2025–26	Abbotsford Canucks	AHL	58	3	18	21	42	—	—	—	—	—
AHL totals			59	3	18	21	42	—	—	—	—	—

=== International ===
Year	Team	Event	Result	GP	G	A	Pts	PIM
2025	Canada	WJC	6th	3	0	1	1	2
Junior totals				3	0	1	1	2

== Awards and honours ==
Award	Year	Ref
WHL
Ed Chynoweth Cup champion	2023	
WHL (U.S.) Second All-Star Team	2024	
AHL
Calder Cup champion	2025	
