= Benjamin Rautiainen =

Finnish ice hockey player (born 2005)

- Born: 12 June 2005 (age 21) Tampere, Finland
- Height: 6 ft 0 in (183 cm)
- Weight: 183 lb (83 kg; 13 st 1 lb)
- Position: Left wing
- Shoots: Left
- Liiga team: Tappara
- NHL draft: 108th overall, 2025; Tampa Bay Lightning
- Playing career: 2023–present

Benjamin Rautiainen (born 12 June 2005) is a Finnish professional ice hockey winger who is currently playing for Tappara of the Finnish Liiga. He was drafted by Tampa Bay Lightning in the fourth round, 108th overall, in the 2025 NHL entry draft.

== Playing career ==
Rautiainen's youth club was Tappara, however he also played for Ilves youth teams before moving back to the youth ranks of Tappara during the 2022–23 season. He made his Liiga debut for Tappara on 20 October 2023 in a game against SaiPa and scored on his debut. Tappara won the Finnish championship in the 2023–24 Liiga season. He played his first full season at the senior level in the 2024–25 Liiga season, after which he was named as a candidate for the Jarmo Wasama Memorial Trophy for the best rookie. He made his breakthrough during the 2025–26 Liiga season, after which he won several awards: Lasse Oksanen trophy and Kultainen kypärä for the best player in the regular season and the Veli-Pekka Ketola trophy for the player who scores the most points during regular season. With 77 points, he set a new Tappara club record for the most points in a single regular season.

== International career ==
Rautiainen represented Finland men's national junior ice hockey team in the 2025 World Junior Ice Hockey Championships, where he scored the overtime winning goal in the semifinal against Sweden. Finland won the silver medal in the tournament.
