= Felix Nilsson =

Swedish ice hockey player (born 2005)

- Born: 22 June 2005 (age 21) Stockholm, Sweden
- Height: 6 ft 0 in (183 cm)
- Weight: 192 lb (87 kg; 13 st 10 lb)
- Position: Forward
- Shoots: Left
- NHL team (P) Cur. team Former teams: Nashville Predators; Milwaukee Admirals (AHL); Rögle BK
- NHL draft: 43rd overall, 2023; Nashville Predators
- Playing career: 2022–present

Felix Nilsson (born 22 June 2005) is a Swedish professional ice hockey player who is a forward for the Milwaukee Admirals of the American Hockey League (AHL) as a prospect under contract to the Nashville Predators of the National Hockey League (NHL). He was drafted 43rd overall by the Predators in the 2023 NHL entry draft.

== Playing career ==
Nilsson made his professional debut for Rögle BK in the Swedish Hockey League (SHL) during the 2022–23 season, and was scoreless in 18 games. During the playoffs he suffered a wrist injury, and missed the remainder of the season, and the 2023 IIHF World U18 Championships. He spent the majority of the season with their J20 team, where he recorded a team-high 41 points in 36 games. On 1 March 2023, he signed a rookie contract with Rögle through the 2024–25 season.

On 29 June 2023, Nilsson was drafted in the second round, 43rd overall, by the Nashville Predators in the 2023 NHL entry draft. During the 2023–24 season, he recorded one goal and two assists in 41 games. He scored his first career SHL goal on 7 December 2023, in a game against Skellefteå AIK.

Nilsson began the 2024–25 season on loan to IK Oskarshamn of the HockeyAllsvenskan, where he recorded one goal in five games. On 2 October 2024, he was recalled by Rögle. On 12 November 2024, he signed a two-year contract extension with Rögle. He finished the season with five goals and 17 assists in 40 games, and won the AIA Junior of the Year award for Rögle.

On 30 May 2026, Nilsson was signed to a three-year, entry-level contract with draft club, the Nashville Predators.

== International play ==
On 4 December 2024, Nilsson was selected to represent Sweden at the 2025 World Junior Ice Hockey Championships. During the tournament he recorded one goal and five assists in seven games, and lost to Czechia in the bronze medal game.

On 1 May 2025, he was selected to represent Sweden at the 2025 IIHF World Championship, where he will make his senior national team debut.

== Career statistics ==
=== Regular season and playoffs ===
			Regular season					Playoffs
Season	Team	League	GP	G	A	Pts	PIM	GP	G	A	Pts	PIM
2021–22	Rögle BK	J18	13	3	8	11	2	8	2	5	7	2
2021–22	Rögle BK	J20	19	3	3	6	2	1	0	0	0	0
2022–23	Rögle BK	J18	1	0	0	0	2	2	1	1	2	2
2022–23	Rögle BK	J20	36	19	22	41	26	1	0	1	1	0
2022–23	Rögle BK	SHL	18	0	0	0	2	2	0	0	0	0
2023–24	Rögle BK	J20	22	8	15	23	10	3	2	2	4	0
2023–24	Rögle BK	SHL	41	1	2	3	2	1	0	0	0	0
2024–25	IK Oskarshamn	Allsv	5	1	0	1	0	—	—	—	—	—
2024–25	Rögle BK	J20	—	—	—	—	—	6	1	1	2	4
2024–25	Rögle BK	SHL	40	5	17	22	4	2	0	0	0	2
2025–26	Rögle BK	SHL	52	14	26	40	14	17	2	4	6	0
SHL totals			151	20	45	65	22	22	2	4	6	2

=== International ===
Year	Team	Event	Result	GP	G	A	Pts	PIM
2022	Sweden	HG18	2nd place, silver medalist(s)	5	0	1	1	2
2025	Sweden	WJC	4th	7	1	5	6	2
Junior totals				12	1	6	7	4
