= 2025 World Junior Ice Hockey Championships =

2025 edition of the World Junior Ice Hockey Championships

2025 IIHF World Junior Championships

Tournament details
- Host country: Canada
- City: Ottawa
- Venue(s): Canadian Tire Centre and TD Place Arena (in 1 host city)
- Dates: December 26, 2024 – January 5, 2025
- Teams: 10

Final positions
- Champions: United States (7th title)
- Runners-up: Finland
- Third place: Czechia
- Fourth place: Sweden

Tournament statistics
- Games played: 29
- Goals scored: 196 (6.76 per game)
- Attendance: 296,894 (10,238 per game)
- Scoring leader: (United States) Cole Hutson (11 points)

Awards
- MVP: (United States) Ryan Leonard

Official website
- www.iihf.com

The 2025 World Junior Ice Hockey Championships (2025 WJHC) was the 49th edition of the Ice Hockey World Junior Championship, held from December 26, 2024 to January 5, 2025. The United States won their second consecutive championship, defeating Finland 4–3 in overtime of the gold medal game.

== Top Division ==
=== Background ===
The tournament returned to Ottawa, which last hosted the 2009 competition. This marked the 19th time that Canada hosted the WJC and fourth time in six years.

The Sports Network (TSN) broadcast more than 84 hours of coverage for the event, including analysis and games at both arenas. The event was the 35th championship broadcast by TSN and the final one produced by Paul Graham.

=== Venues ===
The tournament games were played at the Canadian Tire Centre, home of the Ottawa Senators, and Ottawa Black Bears, and TD Place Arena, home of the Ottawa 67's, Ottawa BlackJacks and Ottawa Charge.

Ottawa		Ottawa is located in Canada
Canadian Tire Centre Capacity: 18,655	TD Place Arena Capacity: 8,585	Ottawa is located in Canada

=== Match officials ===
The following officials were assigned by the International Ice Hockey Federation to officiate the 2025 World Junior Championships.

Referees

- (Latvia) Andris Ansons
- (Finland) Riku Brander
- (Canada) Michael Campbell
- (Denmark) Mads Frandsen
- (Sweden) Christoffer Holm
- (Sweden) Mikael Holm
- (Czech Republic) Jan Hribik
- (Canada) Mike Langin
- (United States) Sean Macfarlane
- (Slovakia) Peter Stano
- (Switzerland) Michael Tscherrig
- (Finland) Kristian Vikman

Linesmen

- (Denmark) Albert Ankerstjerne
- (United States) Nick Briganti
- (United States) Jake Davis
- (Slovakia) Oto Durmis
- (United States) Shane Gustafson
- (Finland) Onni Hautamäki
- (Czech Republic) Daniel Hynek
- (Finland) Tommi Niittylä
- (Sweden) Anders Nyqvist
- (Canada) Tarrington Wyonzek
- (Latvia) Dāvis Zunde

=== Preliminary round ===
==== Seeding ====
Group A
(Canadian Tire Centre)

- United States (1)
- Finland (4)
- Canada (5)
- Latvia (8)
- Germany (9)

Group B
(TD Place Arena)

- Sweden (2)
- Czechia (3)
- Slovakia (6)
- Switzerland (7)
- Kazakhstan (11-Promoted)

Tie-breaking criteria
The ranking of teams in the group stage is determined as follows:
1. points;
2. head-to-head points;
3. head-to-head goal difference;
4. head-to-head number of goals scored;
5. result against closest best-ranked team outside tied teams;
6. result against second-best-ranked team outside tied teams;
7. seeding before tournament.

All times are local, EST (UTC−5).

==== Group A ====
Pos	Team	Pld	W	OTW	OTL	L	GF	GA	GD	Pts	Qualification
1	United States	4	3	0	1	0	22	10	+12	10	Quarterfinals
2	Finland	4	2	1	0	1	10	8	+2	8	Quarterfinals
3	Canada (H)	4	2	0	1	1	10	7	+3	7	Quarterfinals
4	Latvia	4	0	2	0	2	8	13	−5	4	Quarterfinals
5	Germany	4	0	0	1	3	8	20	−12	1	Relegation round

Source: IIHF
Rules for classification: Tiebreakers
(H) Host

December 26, 2024; 14:30	United States	10–4 (2–0, 4–2, 4–2)	Germany	Canadian Tire Centre, Ottawa; Attendance: 13,017

Game reference

Trey Augustine
Goalies
Nico Pertuch
Referees:
(Sweden) Mikael Holm
(Finland) Kristian Vikman
Linesmen:
(Slovakia) Oto Durmis
(Canada) Tarrington Wyonzek

Hagens (Hutson, Leonard) – 08:07	1–0
Perreault (Hagens, Leonard) – 11:56	2–0
Connelly (Eiserman) – 21:38	3–0
	3–1	25:00 – Sumpf (Tropmann) (PP)
	3–2	29:23 – Lewandowski
Hagens (Perreault) – 34:01	4–2
Svoboda (Willis, Fischer) – 38:40	5–2
Perreault (Hutson, Hagens) – 39:39	6–2
Terrance (Svoboda) – 43:04	7–2
	7–3	45:37 – Boos (Niehus, Schwarz)
Ziemer (Plante, Hutson) – 47:16	8–3
Ziemer (Connelly, Hutson) – 49:44	9–3
	9–4	56:14 – Ruckdäschel
Eiserman (Hutson, Nelson) – 58:13	10–4

8 min
Penalties
8 min
56
Shots
22

December 26, 2024; 19:30	Finland	0–4 (0–1, 0–1, 0–2)	Canada	Canadian Tire Centre, Ottawa; Attendance: 17,997

Game reference

Petteri Rimpinen
Goalies
Carter George
Referees:
(Sweden) Christoffer Holm
(United States) Sean Macfarlane
Linesmen:
(United States) Shane Gustafson
(Czech Republic) Daniel Hynek

0–1	19:08 – McKenna (Schaefer, Bonk)
0–2	25:22 – Cowan
0–3	55:14 – Pinelli (Price, Dickinson)
0–4	59:41 – Schaefer (ENG)

8 min
Penalties
12 min
31
Shots
41

December 27, 2024; 15:30	Germany	1–3 (0–1, 1–1, 0–1)	Finland	Canadian Tire Centre, Ottawa; Attendance: 11,956

Game reference

Linus Vieillard
Goalies
Petteri Rimpinen
Referees:
(Sweden) Mikael Holm
(Canada) Mike Langin
Linesmen:
(Sweden) Anders Nyqvist
(Latvia) Dāvis Zunde

	0–1	17:30 – Pieniniemi (Helenius, Kiviharju)
	0–2	25:10 – Alasiurua (Uronen, Nurmi)
Sager (Sumpf) – 27:24	1–2
	1–3	58:43 – Kiiskinen (hynninen, Kangas) (ENG)

6 min
Penalties
6 min
32
Shots
43

December 27, 2024; 19:30	Latvia	3–2 GWS (0–0, 0–1, 2–1) (OT: 0–0) (SO: 1–0)	Canada	Canadian Tire Centre, Ottawa; Attendance: 17,490

Game reference

Linards Feldbergs
Goalies
Jack Ivankovic
Referees:
(Slovakia) Peter Stano
(Switzerland) Michael Tscherrig
Linesmen:
(United States) Nick Briganti
(United States) Jake Davis

	0–1	23:28 – Luchanko (SH)
Mateiko (Osmanis) (PP) – 53:18	1–1
	1–2	54:22 – Ritchie (Cowan, Beaudoin) (PP)
Bulāns (Livšics, Osmanis) (PP) – 57:31	2–2

Osmanis (miss)
Livšics (miss)
Sieradzkis (miss)
Mūrnieks (miss)
Mateiko (miss)
Osmanis (miss)
Osmanis (miss)
Mateiko
Shootout
(miss) Catton
(miss) McKenna
(miss) Martone
(miss) Cowan
(miss) Nadeau
(miss) Ritchie
(miss) Yager
(miss) Catton
10 min
Penalties
16 min
27
Shots
57

December 28, 2024; 15:30	Latvia	1–5 (0–1, 0–3, 1–1)	United States	Canadian Tire Centre, Ottawa; Attendance: 17,997

Game reference

Linards Feldbergs
Goalies
Hampton Slukynsky
Referees:
(Finland) Riku Brander
(Denmark) Mads Frandsen
Linesmen:
(Finland) Onni Hautamäki
(Finland) Tommi Niittylä

	0–1	01:58 – Nelson (Eiserman, Ralph)
	0–2	25:08 – Leonard (Hagens, Perreault) (PP)
	0–3	31:13 – Buium (Hagens)
	0–4	39:54 – Nelson (Ziemer, Eiserman) (PP)
Livšics (Diļevka, Naudiņš) – 48:22	1–4
	1–5	55:31 – Plante (Stiga, Moore)

12 min
Penalties
10 min
26
Shots
41

December 29, 2024; 14:30	United States	3–4 OT (1–1, 1–2, 1–0) (OT: 0–1)	Finland	Canadian Tire Centre, Ottawa; Attendance: 16,433

Game reference

Trey Augustine
Goalies
Petteri Rimpinen
Referees:
(Canada) Michael Campbell
(Switzerland) Michael Tscherrig
Linesmen:
(Sweden) Anders Nyqvist
(Canada) Tarrington Wydnzek

	0–1	09:50 – Alasiurua (Saarelainen) (SH)
Terrance (Svoboda, Willis) – 14:20	1–1
Hutson (Hensler) – 21:45	2–1
	2–2	24:09 – Kiiskinen (Pieniniemi, Helenius) (PP)
	2–3	29:19 – Miettinen (Halttunen, Kumpulainen)
Ziemer (Stiga, Moore) – 43:26	3–3
	3–4	61:46 – Uronen

12 min
Penalties
8 min
33
Shots
44

December 29, 2024; 19:30	Canada	3–0 (1–0, 0–0, 2–0)	Germany	Canadian Tire Centre, Ottawa; Attendance: 18,526

Game reference

Carter George
Goalies
Nico Pertuch
Referees:
(Denmark) Mads Frandsen
(Czech Republic) Jan Hribik
Linesmen:
(Slovakia) Oto Durmis
(Czech Republic) Daniel Hynek

Bonk (Cowan, Catton) (PP) – 09:40	1–0
Price (Mynio, Ritchie) – 55:02	2–0
Cataford (George) (ENG) – 59:57	3–0

8 min
Penalties
10 min
36
Shots
25

December 30, 2024; 15:30	Germany	3–4 OT (1–0, 1–1, 1–2) (OT: 0–1)	Latvia	Canadian Tire Centre, Ottawa; Attendance: 10,920

Game reference

Linus Vieillard
Goalies
Linards Feldbergs
Referees:
(Canada) Mike Langin
(Slovakia) Peter Stano
Linesmen:
(Denmark) Albert Ankerstjerne
(United States) Nick Briganti

Seidl (Sumpf) – 00:19	1–0
Tropmann (Schafer, Sumpf) (PP) – 28:40	2–0
	2–1	29:12 – Mateiko (Osmanis, Mūrnieks)
	2–2	46:55 – Osmanis (Bulāns, Mūrnieks)
	2–3	57:16 – Mūrnieks (SH, ENG)
Lewandowski (Panocha, Brandl) (PP, EA) – 57:36	3–3
	3–4	63:23 – Mateiko

4 min
Penalties
6 min
39
Shots
22

December 31, 2024; 14:30	Finland	3–0 (1–0, 1–0, 1–0)	Latvia	Canadian Tire Centre, Ottawa; Attendance: 12,092

Game reference

Petteri Rimpinen
Goalies
Linards Feldbergs
Referees:
(Sweden) Mikael Holm
(United States) Sean Macfarlane
Linesmen:
(United States) Shane Gustafson
(Canada) Tarrington Wydnzek

Rautiainen (Helenius, Väisänen) – 07:05	1–0
Kiiskinen (Nieminen, Ruohonen) – 27:06	2–0
Halttunen (Kiviharju, Rautiainen) (PP) – 42:05	3–0

10 min
Penalties
8 min
39
Shots
28

December 31, 2024; 20:00	Canada	1–4 (0–1, 0–0, 1–3)	United States	Canadian Tire Centre, Ottawa; Attendance: 18,935

Game reference

Carter George
Goalies
Trey Augustine
Referees:
(Latvia) Andris Ansons
(Sweden) Christoffer Holm
Linesmen:
(Finland) Onni Hautamäki
(Sweden) Anders Nyqvist

	0–1	13:02 – Hutson (Eiserman) (PP)
Nadeau (Yager, Molenkyk) (PP) – 41:58	1–1
	1–2	44:22 – Nelson (Hutson, Connelly) (PP)
	1–3	53:21 – Eiserman (Buium) (PP)
	1–4	58:08 – Leonard (ENG)

22 min
Penalties
14 min
39
Shots
28

==== Group B ====
Pos	Team	Pld	W	OTW	OTL	L	GF	GA	GD	Pts	Qualification
1	Sweden	4	4	0	0	0	24	10	+14	12	Quarterfinals
2	Czechia	4	3	0	0	1	25	9	+16	9	Quarterfinals
3	Slovakia	4	1	1	0	2	11	14	−3	5	Quarterfinals
4	Switzerland	4	1	0	0	3	10	15	−5	3	Quarterfinals
5	Kazakhstan	4	0	0	1	3	8	30	−22	1	Relegation round

Source: IIHF
Rules for classification: Tiebreakers

December 26, 2024; 12:00	Slovakia	2–5 (1–0, 0–2, 1–3)	Sweden	TD Place Arena, Ottawa; Attendance: 4,443

Game reference

Samuel Urban
Goalies
Melker Thelin
Referees:
(Canada) Michael Campbell
(Canada) Mike Langin
Linesmen:
(Denmark) Albert Ankerstjerne
(Finland) Onni Hautamäki

Dvorský (Chromiak, Štrbák) – 11:53	1–0
	1–1	23:41 – Bergqvist (Sandin Pellikka, Granberg)
	1–2	37:43 – Sandin Pellikka (Unger Sörum, Willander) (PP)
	1–3	43:58 – Sandin Pellikka (Unger Sörum, Stenberg)
	1–4	54:01 – Sandin Pellikka (Stenberg, Edstrom)
	1–5	55:29 – Eriksson (Granberg, Hedqvist)
Jenčko (Pekarčík, Štrbák) (PP) – 58:35	2–5

6 min
Penalties
8 min
17
Shots
34

December 26, 2024; 17:00	Czechia	5–1 (1–0, 2–0, 2–1)	Switzerland	TD Place Arena, Ottawa; Attendance: 3,561

Game reference

Michael Hrabal
Goalies
Elijah Neuenschwander
Referees:
(Latvia) Andris Ansons
(Denmark) Mads Frandsen
Linesmen:
(United States) Nick Briganti
(Sweden) Anders Nyqvist

Holinka (Galvas) – 04:46	1–0
Šalé (Holinka, Galvas) (PP) – 26:10	2–0
Kos (Port, Fibigr) – 27:28	3–0
Štancl (Felcman, Jecho) – 44:31	4–0
	4–1	47:08 – Braillard (E. Meier, S. Meier)
Sikora (Štancl, Hradec) (EN) – 57:31	5–1

10 min
Penalties
10 min
35
Shots
26

December 27, 2024; 13:00	Switzerland	1–2 (0–1, 1–0, 0–1)	Slovakia	TD Place Arena, Ottawa; Attendance: 3,672

Game reference

Christian Kirsch
Goalies
Samuel Urban
Referees:
(Finland) Riku Brander
(Finland) Kristian Vikman
Linesmen:
(Denmark) Albert Ankerstjerne
(Finland) Tommi Niittylä

	0–1	18:46 – Jenčko (Radivojevič, Dvorský) (EA)
Schneller (Reber) – 33:48	1–1
	1–2	56:42 – Chovan

4 min
Penalties
4 min
29
Shots
29

December 27, 2024; 17:00	Sweden	8–1 (5–0, 1–1, 2–0)	Kazakhstan	TD Place Arena, Ottawa; Attendance: 3,574

Game reference

Marcus Gidlöf
Goalies
Vladimir Nikitin
Referees:
(Canada) Michael Campbell
(Czech Republic) Jan Hribik
Linesmen:
(United States) Shane Gustafson
(Czech Republic) Daniel Hynek

Eklund (Willander, Wahlberg) – 05:53	1–0
Edstrom (Gustafsson, Hallquisth) – 09:20	2–0
Eriksson (Granberg, Hedqvist) – 11:58	3–0
Nilsson (Hurtig, Wahlberg) – 13:36	4–0
Wahlberg (Forsfjäll, Eklund) – 19:47	5–0
Wahlberg (Lindstein, Stenberg) (PP) – 32:18	6–0
	6–1	37:28 – Gross (Sitnikov, Orazov)
Vuollet (Forsfjäll, Gustafsson) – 45:24	7–1
Granberg – 48:44	8–1

4 min
Penalties
6 min
52
Shots
16

December 28, 2024; 13:00	Kazakhstan	2–14 (1–4, 0–8, 1–2)	Czechia	TD Place Arena, Ottawa; Attendance: 3,058

Game reference

Vladimir Nikitin
Jokhar Dudarkiyev
Goalies
Jan Kavan
Referees:
(Latvia) Andris Ansons
(Finland) Kristian Vikman
Linesmen:
(Slovakia) Oto Durmis
(Canada) Tarrington Wyonzek

	0–1	05:45 – Maštalířský (Fibigr, Šalé)
	0–2	05:51 – Sikora (Štancl)
	0–3	11:01 – Dvořák (Šalé, Felcman)
	0–4	14:45 – Hradec (Port, Fibigr)
Lyapunov (Simonov, Beisembayev) (PP) – 18:34	1–4
	1–5	22:54 – Jecho (Port, Čihař)
	1–6	24:10 – Maštalířský
	1–7	25:09 – Štancl (Sikora, Hradec)
	1–8	27:25 – Maštalířský (Petr, Fibigr)
	1–9	29:17 – Štancl (Hradec)
	1–10	29:32 – Novotný
	1–11	31:35 – Hradec (Sikora)
	1–12	32:05 – Čihař (Port, Fibigr)
Kim (Ruslanuly, Orazov) – 41:29	2–12
	2–13	58:18 – Štancl (Husinecký)
	2–14	58:49 – Hradec (Štancl)

8 min
Penalties
6 min
18
Shots
36

December 29, 2024; 12:00	Switzerland	5–7 (1–3, 0–3, 4–1)	Sweden	TD Place Arena, Ottawa; Attendance: 5,756

Game reference

Elijah Neuenschwander
Christian Kirsch
Goalies
Melker Thelin
Referees:
(United States) Sean Macfarlane
(Slovakia) Peter Stano
Linesmen:
(United States) Shane Gustafson
(Latvia) Dāvis Zunde

	0–1	06:52 – Willander (Sandin Pellikka, Unger Sörum) (PP)
Gruber (Antenen, Bünzli) – 12:18	1–1
	1–2	13:15 – Forsfjäll (Hedqvist, Granberg)
	1–3	18:52 – Stenberg (Lindstein, Nilsson) (PP)
	1–4	24:52 – Granberg (Hedqvist, Forsfjäll)
	1–5	28:52 – Willander (Unger Sörum, Edstrom) (PP)
	1–6	39:48 – Eklund (Sandin Pellikka, Willander)
Gruber (Muggli, Dorthe) (PP) – 44:21	2–6
	2–7	49:44 – Sandin Pelikka (Eklund, Johnson) (PP)
Braillard (Muggli, Graf) (PP) – 51:17	3–7
Kaderli (Muggli, Gruber) (PP) – 54:16	4–7
Braillard (Kaderli,) (PP) – 59:47	5–7

18 min
Penalties
18 min
35
Shots
36

December 29, 2024; 17:00	Czechia	4–2 (2–0, 1–1, 1–1)	Slovakia	TD Place Arena, Ottawa; Attendance: 5,099

Game reference

Michael Hrabel
Goalies
Alan Lendak
Referees:
(Sweden) Christoffer Holm
(Sweden) Mikael Holm
Linesmen:
(United States) Jake Davis
(Finland) Onni Hautamäki

Hradec (Maštalířský) (SH) – 11:12	1–0
Šimek (Jecho, Židlický) – 15:10	2–0
	2–1	30:48 – Císar (Kralovic, Chovan)
Šalé (Maštalířský, Jiříček) – 37:21	3–1
Šalé (Holinka, Galvas) (PP) – 48:48	4–1
	4–2	54:52 – Dvorský (Štrbák, Vojtech) (PP2, EA)

37 min
Penalties
10 min
26
Shots
27

December 30, 2024; 13:00	Slovakia	5–4 OT (3–0, 1–2, 0–2) (OT: 1–0)	Kazakhstan	TD Place Arena, Ottawa; Attendance: 2,790

Game reference

Samuel Urban
Goalies
Vladimir Nikitin
Referees:
(United States) Sean Macfarlane
(Switzerland) Michael Tscherrig
Linesmen:
(Finland) Tommi Niittylä
(Latvia) Dāvis Zunde

Dvorský (Jenčko) – 08:07	1–0
Dvorský (Pekarčík, Radivojevič) – 13:19	2–0
Pekarčík (Dvorský, Štrbák) (PP) – 19:51	3–0
	3–1	22:02 – Gross
Pekarčík (Dvorský, Jenčko) – 32:36	4–1
	4–2	36:14 – Sarkenov (Alibek, Reshetko)
	4–3	56:37 – Nurkenov (SH)
	4–4	59:31 – Lyapunov (SH)
Štrbák (Pekarčík, Pobežal) – 62:55	5–4

8 min
Penalties
33 min
42
Shots
17

December 31, 2024; 12:00	Kazakhstan	1–3 (1–1, 0–1, 0–1)	Switzerland	TD Place Arena, Ottawa; Attendance: 2,900

Game reference

Vladimir Nikitin
Goalies
Christian Kirsch
Referees:
(Canada) Michael Campbell
(Denmark) Mads Frandsen
Linesmen:
(United States) Nick Briganti
(Czech Republic) Daniel Hynek

	0–1	01:41 – S. Meier (Schneller, Johnson) (PP)
Lyapunov (Ruslanuly, Orazov) – 06:10	1–1
	1–2	37:18 – Antenen
	1–3	48:59 – Johnson (S. Meier, Schneller) (PP)

14 min
Penalties
8 min
12
Shots
35

December 31, 2024; 17:00	Sweden	4–2 (0–0, 4–1, 0–1)	Czechia	TD Place Arena, Ottawa; Attendance: 6,138

Game reference

Melker Thelin
Goalies
Michael Hrabal
Referees:
(Finland) Riku Brander
(Finland) Kristian Vikman
Linesmen:
(United States) Jake Davis
(Slovakia) Oto Durmis

Traff (Lindstein, Nilsson) (PP) – 21:52	1–0
Traff (Wahlberg, Stenberg) – 27:18	2–0
	2–1	31:57 – Sikora (Jecho, Jiříček) (PP)
Unger Sörum (Stenberg, Sandin Pellikka) – 38:17	3–1
Wahlberg (Nilsson, Eklund) – 38:47	4–1
	4–2	40:34 – Šalé (PS)

4 min
Penalties
14 min
41
Shots
30

=== Relegation round ===
January 2, 2025; 11:00	Germany	4–3 (1–2, 2–1, 1–0)	Kazakhstan	Canadian Tire Centre, Ottawa; Attendance: 6,177

Game reference

Linus Vieillard
Goalies
Vladimir Nikitin
Referees:
(Latvia) Andris Ansons
(Switzerland) Michael Tscherrig
Linesmen:
(Sweden) Anders Nyqvist
(Canada) Tarrington Wyonzek

	0–1	04:33 – Ruslanuly (Orazov)
Schafer (Maul) – 04:41	1–1
	1–2	17:46 – Sitnikov (Migunov, Gross)
	1–3	22:02 – Gross (Kankin)
Schafer (Sumpf, Samanski) (PP2) – 23:58	2–3
Tropmann (Seidl, Sumpf) (PP) – 24:19	3–3
Sumpf (Tropmann) (PP) – 44:03	4–3

6 min
Penalties
18 min
22
Shots
31

=== Playoff round ===
Winning teams were reseeded for the semifinals in accordance with the following ranking:

1. Higher position in their group
2. Higher number of points in preliminary pool play
3. Better goal differential
4. Higher number of goals scored
5. Better seeding coming into the tournament (final placement at the 2024 World Junior Ice Hockey Championships)

Rank	Team	Group	Pos	Pts	GD	GF	Seed
1	Sweden	B	1	12	+14	24	2
2	United States	A	1	10	+12	22	1
3	Czechia	B	2	9	+16	25	3
4	Finland	A	2	8	+2	10	4
5	Canada	A	3	7	+3	10	5
6	Slovakia	B	3	5	−3	11	6
7	Latvia	A	4	4	–5	8	8
8	Switzerland	B	4	3	–5	10	7

==== Bracket ====
Quarterfinals
January 2 – TD Place Arena
1B Sweden	3
4A Latvia	2
January 2 – TD Place Arena
2A Finland	5
3B Slovakia	3
January 2 – Canadian Tire Centre
1A United States	7
4B Switzerland	2
January 2 – Canadian Tire Centre
2B Czechia	4
3A Canada	3

Semifinals
January 4 – Canadian Tire Centre
1 Sweden	3
4 Finland (OT)	4
January 4 – Canadian Tire Centre
2 United States	4
3 Czechia	1

Final
January 5 – Canadian Tire Centre
2 United States (OT)	4
4 Finland	3
Third place
January 5 – Canadian Tire Centre
1 Sweden	2
3 Czechia (GWS)	3

==== Quarterfinals ====
January 2, 2025; 12:00	Sweden	3–2 (2–0, 1–2, 0–0)	Latvia	TD Place Arena, Ottawa; Attendance: 5,033

Game reference

Melker Thelin
Goalies
Linards Feldbergs
Referees:
(Canada) Mike Langin
(Finland) Kristian Vikman
Linesmen:
(United States) Shane Gustafson
(Czech Republic) Daniel Hynek

Forsfjäll (Bergqvist) – 08:30	1–0
Wahlberg (Sandin Pellikka, Nilsson) – 09:52	2–0
Edstrom (Eklund, Unger Sörum) (PP) – 23:57	3–0
	3–1	30:13 – Mateiko (Sieradzkis, Uljanskis)
	3–2	38:50 – Mateiko (Mūrnieks, Sieradzkis)

4 min
Penalties
8 min
50
Shots
13

January 2, 2025; 14:30	United States	7–2 (4–1, 3–0, 0–1)	Switzerland	Canadian Tire Centre, Ottawa; Attendance: 12,772

Game reference

Hampton Slukynsky
Goalies
Christian Kirsch
Elijah Neuenschwander
Referees:
(Czech Republic) Jan Hribik
(Slovakia) Peter Stano
Linesmen:
(Slovakia) Oto Durmis
(Latvia) Dāvis Zunde

Svoboda – 06:39	1–0
Hagens (Moore, Ziemer) – 08:23	2–0
Leonard – 11:35	3–0
	3–1	15:04 – Rhyn (Reber) (SH)
Nelson (Moore, Ziemer) – 16:44	4–1
Buium (Perreault) (PP) – 27:45	5–1
Hagens (Perreault, Kleber) – 35:03	6–1
Leonard (Perreault, Buium) (PP) – 36:23	7–1
	7–2	46:53 – Kaderli (Gruber, Braillard) (PP)

6 min
Penalties
8 min
31
Shots
19

January 2, 2025; 17:00	Finland	5–3 (3–0, 1–1, 1–2)	Slovakia	TD Place Arena, Ottawa; Attendance: 6,427

Game reference

Petteri Rimpinen
Goalies
Alan Lendak
Samuel Urban
Referees:
(Denmark) Mads Frandsen
(Sweden) Mikael Holm
Linesmen:
(Denmark) Albert Ankerstjerne
(United States) Nick Briganti

Kiiskinen (Nurmi, Ruohonen) – 01:10	1–0
Nurmi (Kiiskinen, Nieminen) – 03:54	2–0
Halttunen (Kiviharju, Rautiainen) – 13:03	3–0
	3–1	30:15 – Pekarčík (Dvorský, Štrbák) (PP)
Kumpulainen (Rautiainen, Jokinen) – 35:53	4–1
	4–2	49:13 – Fedor (Kukumberg)
	4–3	56:04 – Dvorský (Pekarčík, Kralovic)
Nurmi (Ruohonen, Miettinen) – 58:01	5–3

33 min
Penalties
6 min
18
Shots
36

January 2, 2025; 19:30	Czechia	4–3 (3–1, 0–1, 1–1)	Canada	Canadian Tire Centre, Ottawa; Attendance: 18,254

Game reference

Michael Hrabal
Goalies
Carter George
Referees:
(Finland) Riku Brander
(United States) Sean Macfarlane
Linesmen:
(United States) Jake Davis
(Finland) Tommi Niittylä

Sikora (Hradec) – 00:43	1–0
	1–1	10:17 – Howe (Yager) (SH)
Štancl (Jecho, Jiříček) (PP) – 12:45	2–1
Šalé (Maštalířský, Galvas) – 19:57	3–1
	3–2	37:40 – Martone (Molendyk, Yager) (PP)
	3–3	55:42 – Nadeau (Pinelli, Dickinson)
Jecho (Jiříček, Sikora) (PP) – 59:20	4–3

10 min
Penalties
55 min
26
Shots
32

==== Semifinals ====
January 4, 2025; 15:30	Sweden	3–4 OT (0–0, 2–3, 1–0) (OT: 0–1)	Finland	Canadian Tire Centre, Ottawa; Attendance: 13,642

Game reference

Melker Thelin
Goalies
Petteri Rimpinen
Referees:
(Canada) Michael Campbell
(United States) Sean Macfarlane
Linesmen:
(United States) Nick Briganti
(Czech Republic) Daniel Hynek

Stenberg (Bergqvist) – 21:22	1–0
	1–1	24:32 – Hemming (Helenius, Hynninen)
	1–2	33:28 – Kiiskinen (Hynninen, Helenius) (PP)
Stenberg (Lindstein, Nilsson) (PP) – 38:07	2–2
	2–3	39:39 – Alasiurua (Hemming, Helenius)
Hallquisth (Gustafsson, Unger Sörum) – 51:32	3–3
	3–4	69:22 – Rautiainen (Helenius, Halttunen) (PP)

10 min
Penalties
8 min
46
Shots
35

January 4, 2025; 19:30	United States	4–1 (1–1, 1–0, 2–0)	Czechia	Canadian Tire Centre, Ottawa; Attendance: 14,191

Game reference

Trey Augustine
Goalies
Michael Hrabal
Referees:
(Sweden) Christoffer Holm
(Canada) Mike Langin
Linesmen:
(Finland) Onni Hautamäki
(Canada) Tarrington Wyonzek

Perreault (Leonard, Minnetian) – 03:14	1–0
	1–1	09:28 – Štancl
Eiserman (Connelly, Hutson) (PP) – 33:41	2–1
Leonard (Perreault, Minnetian) – 55:33	3–1
Moore (Nelson, Svoboda) (PP, EN) – 58:53	4–1

6 min
Penalties
8 min
25
Shots
27

==== Bronze medal game ====
January 5, 2025; 15:30	Sweden	2–3 GWS (1–1, 1–1, 0–0) (OT: 0–0) (SO: 2–3)	Czechia	Canadian Tire Centre, Ottawa; Attendance: 11,393

Game reference

Marcus Gidlöf
Goalies
Michael Hrabal
Referees:
(Latvia) Andris Ansons
(Canada) Mike Langin
Linesmen:
(Finland) Tommi Niittylä
(Canada) Tarrington Wyonzek

	0–1	03:47 - Štancl (Jecho, Jiříček) (PP)
Edstrom (Unger Sörum, Sandin-Pellikka) (PP) - 12:31	1–1
	1–2	29:27 - Šalé (Holinka)
Edstrom (Unger Sörum, Wahlberg) - 35:40	2–2

Nilsson (miss)
Sandin-Pellikka
Stenberg (miss)
Edstrom (miss)
Forsfjäll (miss)
Sandin-Pellikka (miss)
Nilsson (miss)
Unger Sörum (miss)
Sandin-Pellikka (miss)
Nilsson (miss)
Eklund (miss)
Sandin-Pellikka (miss)
Stenberg
Stenberg (miss)
Shootout
(miss) Holinka
Štancl
(miss) Jecho
(miss) Šalé
(miss) Sikora
(miss) Štancl
(miss) Šalé
(miss) Štancl
(miss) Šalé
(miss) Maštalířský
(miss) Felcman
(miss) Hradec
Šalé
Šalé
2 min
Penalties
6 min
34
Shots
33

==== Gold medal game ====
January 5, 2025; 19:30	United States	4–3 OT (1–2, 2–1, 0–0) (OT: 1–0)	Finland	Canadian Tire Centre, Ottawa; Attendance: 16,822

Game reference

Trey Augustine
Goalies
Petteri Rimpinen
Referees:
(Sweden) Christoffer Holm
(Canada) Michael Campbell
Linesmen:
(United States) Jake Davis
(Finland) Onni Hautamäki

	0–1	07:13 – Kiiskinen (Hemming, Hynninen) (PP)
Hagens (Leonard, Perreault) – 12:04	1–1
	1–2	13:03 – Uronen (Alasiurua, Hemming)
	1–3	24:52 – Pieniniemi (Nurmi, Ruohonen)
Svoboda (Hutson, Plante) – 37:38	2–3
Hutson (Buium, Leonard) – 39:31	3–3
Stiga (Buium, Ziemer) – 68:04	4–3

4 min
Penalties
2 min
40
Shots
24

=== Statistics ===
==== Scoring leaders ====
Pos	Player	Country	GP	G	A	Pts	+/−	PIM
1	Cole Hutson	United States	7	3	8	11	+11	2
2	Jakub Štancl	Czechia	7	7	3	10	+6	0
3	Ryan Leonard	United States	7	5	5	10	+10	12
4	Axel Sandin Pellikka	Sweden	7	4	6	10	+8	6
5	Gabe Perreault	United States	7	3	7	10	+10	0
6	Felix Unger Sörum	Sweden	7	1	9	10	+5	0
7	Dalibor Dvorský	Slovakia	5	5	4	9	–2	0
8	James Hagens	United States	7	5	4	9	+9	2
9	Eduard Šalé	Czechia	7	6	2	8	+4	4
10	Vojtěch Hradec	Czechia	7	4	4	8	+9	4
10	Anton Wahlberg	Sweden	7	4	4	8	+7	2

GP = Games played; G = Goals; A = Assists; Pts = Points; +/− = Plus–minus; PIM = Penalties In Minutes
Source: IIHF.com

==== Goaltending leaders ====
(minimum 40% team's total ice time)

Pos	Player	Country	TOI	GA	GAA	SA	Sv%	SO
1	Carter George	Canada	239:01	7	1.76	109	93.58	2
2	Petteri Rimpinen	Finland	436:45	17	2.34	255	93.33	1
3	Linards Feldbergs	Latvia	306:46	16	3.13	226	92.92	0
4	Michael Hrabal	Czechia	366:45	15	2.45	184	91.85	0
5	Trey Augustine	United States	309:50	13	2.52	156	91.67	0

TOI = Time on ice (minutes:seconds); GA = Goals against; GAA = Goals against average; SA = Shots against; Sv% = Save percentage; SO = Shutouts
Source: IIHF.com

=== Awards ===
- Best players selected by the directorate:
  - Best Goaltender: (Finland) Petteri Rimpinen
  - Best Defenceman: (Sweden) Axel Sandin Pellikka
  - Best Forward: (United States) Ryan Leonard
- Media All-Stars:
  - MVP: (United States) Ryan Leonard
  - Goaltender: (Finland) Petteri Rimpinen
  - Defencemen: (United States) Cole Hutson / (Sweden) Axel Sandin Pellikka
  - Forwards: (United States) Ryan Leonard/ (Czech Republic) Jakub Štancl / (United States) Gabe Perreault

=== Final standings ===
Pos	Team	Pld	W	OTW	OTL	L	GF	GA	GD	Pts	Final Result
1	United States	7	5	1	1	0	37	16	+21	18	Champions
2	Finland	7	3	2	1	1	22	18	+4	14	Runners-up
3	Czechia	7	4	1	0	2	33	18	+15	14	Third place
4	Sweden	7	5	0	2	0	32	19	+13	17	Fourth place
5	Canada (H)	5	2	0	1	2	13	11	+2	7	Eliminated in Quarterfinals
6	Slovakia	5	1	1	0	3	14	19	−5	5	Eliminated in Quarterfinals
7	Latvia	5	0	2	0	3	10	16	−6	4	Eliminated in Quarterfinals
8	Switzerland	5	1	0	0	4	12	22	−10	3	Eliminated in Quarterfinals
9	Germany	5	1	0	1	3	12	23	−11	4	Avoided relegation
10	Kazakhstan	5	0	0	1	4	11	34	−23	1	Relegated to the 2026 Division I A

Source: IIHF
(H) Host

== Division I ==
=== Group A ===
The Division I A tournament was played in Bled, Slovenia, from 9 to 15 December 2024.

Pos	Team	Pld	W	OTW	OTL	L	GF	GA	GD	Pts	Promotion or relegation
1	Denmark	5	4	0	1	0	17	12	+5	13	Promotion to the 2026 Top Division
2	Austria	5	4	0	0	1	16	10	+6	12	
3	Norway	5	3	0	0	2	13	8	+5	9	
4	Slovenia (H)	5	2	0	0	3	18	16	+2	6	
5	France	5	1	1	0	3	15	20	−5	5	
6	Hungary	5	0	0	0	5	7	20	−13	0	Relegation to the 2026 Division I B

Source: IIHF
Rules for classification: 1) points; 2) head-to-head points; 3) head-to-head goal difference; 4) head-to-head number of goals scored; 5) result against closest best-ranked team outside tied teams; 6) result against second-best-ranked team outside tied teams; 7) seeding before tournament.
(H) Host

=== Group B ===
The Division I B tournament was played in Tallinn, Estonia, from 11 to 17 January 2025.

Pos	Team	Pld	W	OTW	OTL	L	GF	GA	GD	Pts	Promotion or relegation
1	Ukraine	5	5	0	0	0	29	10	+19	15	Promotion to the 2026 Division I A
2	Japan	5	2	1	1	1	26	24	+2	9 (Note: Italy 4–7 Japan)	
3	Italy	5	3	0	0	2	23	21	+2	9	
4	Estonia (H)	5	2	0	0	3	16	23	−7	6	
5	Poland	5	1	0	1	3	14	21	−7	4	
6	South Korea	5	0	1	0	4	10	19	−9	2	Relegation to the 2026 Division II A

Source: IIHF
Rules for classification: 1) points; 2) head-to-head points; 3) head-to-head goal difference; 4) head-to-head number of goals scored; 5) result against closest best-ranked team outside tied teams; 6) result against second-best-ranked team outside tied teams; 7) seeding before tournament.
(H) Host

== Division II ==
=== Group A ===
The Division II A tournament was played in Zagreb, Croatia, from 6 to 12 January 2025.

Pos	Team	Pld	W	OTW	OTL	L	GF	GA	GD	Pts	Promotion or relegation
1	Lithuania	5	5	0	0	0	39	5	+34	15	Promotion to the 2026 Division I B
2	Romania	5	3	0	0	2	16	15	+1	9 (Note: Romania 6–4 Croatia)	
3	Croatia (H)	5	3	0	0	2	22	26	−4	9	
4	Great Britain	5	2	0	0	3	11	15	−4	6 (Note: Great Britain 4–3 China)	
5	China	5	2	0	0	3	18	24	−6	6	
6	Netherlands	5	0	0	0	5	9	30	−21	0	Relegation to the 2026 Division II B

Source: IIHF
Rules for classification: 1) points; 2) head-to-head points; 3) head-to-head goal difference; 4) head-to-head number of goals scored; 5) result against closest best-ranked team outside tied teams; 6) result against second-best-ranked team outside tied teams; 7) seeding before tournament.
(H) Host

=== Group B ===
The Division II B tournament was played in Belgrade, Serbia, from 19 to 25 January 2025.

Pos	Team	Pld	W	OTW	OTL	L	GF	GA	GD	Pts	Promotion or relegation
1	Spain	5	4	0	1	0	18	9	+9	13	Promotion to the 2026 Division II A
2	Israel	5	3	0	0	2	18	19	−1	9	
3	Serbia (H)	5	2	1	0	2	18	13	+5	8	
4	Australia	5	2	0	0	3	18	19	−1	6 (Note: Iceland 4–5 Australia)	
5	Iceland	5	2	0	0	3	16	14	+2	6	
6	Belgium	5	1	0	0	4	10	24	−14	3	Relegation to the 2026 Division III A

Source: IIHF
Rules for classification: 1) points; 2) head-to-head points; 3) head-to-head goal difference; 4) head-to-head number of goals scored; 5) result against closest best-ranked team outside tied teams; 6) result against second-best-ranked team outside tied teams; 7) seeding before tournament.
(H) Host

== Division III ==
=== Group A ===
The Division III A tournament was played in Istanbul, Turkey, from 27 January to 2 February 2025.

Pos	Team	Pld	W	OTW	OTL	L	GF	GA	GD	Pts	Promotion or relegation
1	New Zealand	5	5	0	0	0	32	8	+24	15	Promotion to the 2026 Division II B
2	Chinese Taipei	5	4	0	0	1	39	11	+28	12	
3	Bulgaria	5	3	0	0	2	29	17	+12	9	
4	Turkey (H)	5	2	0	0	3	27	31	−4	6	
5	Bosnia and Herzegovina	5	1	0	0	4	12	54	−42	3	
6	Mexico	5	0	0	0	5	13	31	−18	0	Relegation to the 2026 Division III B

Source: IIHF
Rules for classification: 1) points; 2) head-to-head points; 3) head-to-head goal difference; 4) head-to-head number of goals scored; 5) result against closest best-ranked team outside tied teams; 6) result against second-best-ranked team outside tied teams; 7) seeding before tournament.
(H) Host

=== Group B ===
The Division III B tournament was played in Bangkok, Thailand, from 11 to 14 December 2024.

Pos	Team	Pld	W	OTW	OTL	L	GF	GA	GD	Pts	Promotion
1	Thailand (H)	3	3	0	0	0	19	5	+14	9	Promotion to the 2026 Division III A
2	Kyrgyzstan	3	2	0	0	1	14	9	+5	6	
3	South Africa	3	0	1	0	2	11	21	−10	2	
4	Luxembourg	3	0	0	1	2	9	18	−9	1	

Source: IIHF
Rules for classification: 1) points; 2) head-to-head points; 3) head-to-head goal difference; 4) head-to-head number of goals scored; 5) result against closest best-ranked team outside tied teams; 6) result against second-best-ranked team outside tied teams; 7) seeding before tournament.
(H) Host
