= Petr Sikora =

Czech ice hockey player (born 2006)

- Born: 2 January 2006 (age 20) Karviná, Czech Republic
- Height: 6 ft 0 in (183 cm)
- Weight: 194 lb (88 kg; 13 st 12 lb)
- Position: Centre
- Shoots: Left
- NHL team (P) Cur. team Former teams: Washington Capitals; Hershey Bears (AHL); HC Oceláři Třinec
- NHL draft: 178th overall, 2024; Washington Capitals
- Playing career: 2023–present

Petr Sikora (born 2 January 2006) is a Czech professional ice hockey player for the Hershey Bears in the American Hockey League (AHL) as a prospect to the Washington Capitals of the National Hockey League (NHL). He was drafted 178th overall by the Capitals in the 6th round of the 2024 NHL entry draft.

== Playing career ==
Sikora played for HC Oceláři Třinec at the under-17 level in 2021-22 where he scored 15 goals and 24 assists in 31 games.

During the 2022–23 season, Sikora split time between Oceláři Třinec's under-17 and under-20 teams. At the under-20 level in 2022–23, he played 18 games and scored four goals and five assists.

In 2023–24, he played the majority of the season at U20 where he scored 40 points in 30 games and was called up to the Czech Extraliga to make his senior professional debut.

He was selected 178th overall by the Washington Capitals in sixth round of the 2024 NHL entry draft. After attending camp in Washington, he informed the Capitals that he'd be returning to the Extraliga to play with Oceláři Třinec for the 2024–25 season.

He played most of 2024–25 in the Extraliga with Oceláři Třinec, finishing with seven goals and eight assists in 34 games, logging 61 penalty minutes. In the 2024–25 Extraliga playoffs, Sikora played 6 games before a leg injury ended his season. On 7 May 2026, Sikora signed a three-year, entry level contract with Washington Capitals.

== International play ==
Medal record

Representing Czech Republic

Ice hockey

World Junior Championships
Silver medal – second place	2026 United States	
Bronze medal – third place	2025 Canada	

Hlinka Gretzky Cup
Silver medal – second place	2023 Czech Republic/Slovakia	

Sikora played for the Czech Republic at the 2022 World U-17 Hockey Challenge and won a silver medal with the Czech national under-18 team at the 2023 Hlinka Gretzky Cup.

Sikora represented the Czech Republic at the 2024 IIHF World U18 Championship, where he scored two points in 5 games and logged 27 penalty minutes.

Sikora won a bronze medal with the Czech Republic men's junior team at the 2025 IIHF World Junior Championship, scoring four goals and three assists in 7 games.

Sikora also represented the Czech Republic at the 2026 IIHF World Junior Championship, where he won a silver medal. He was team captain, and logged two goals and seven assists in 7 games.

== Career statistics ==
=== Regular season and playoffs ===
			Regular season					Playoffs
Season	Team	League	GP	G	A	Pts	PIM	GP	G	A	Pts	PIM
2021–22	HC Oceláři Třinec	Czech U17	31	15	24	39	10	5	1	1	2	2
2022–23	HC Oceláři Třinec	Czech U17	14	9	12	21	12	11	6	10	16	6
2022–23	HC Oceláři Třinec	Czech U20	18	4	5	9	6	3	0	0	0	2
2023–24	HC Oceláři Třinec	Czech U20	30	13	27	40	32	4	5	2	7	0
2023-24	HC Oceláři Třinec	ELH	22	1	2	3	2	—	—	—	—	—
2024–25	HC Oceláři Třinec	Czech U20	2	2	3	5	2	—	—	—	—	—
2024–25	HC Oceláři Třinec	ELH	34	7	8	15	61	6	1	3	4	2
2025–26	HC Oceláři Třinec	ELH	24	3	6	9	8	10	1	1	2	11
2025–26	HC Frýdek-Místek	Czech.1	4	2	4	6	0	—	—	—	—	—
ELH totals			80	11	16	27	71	16	2	4	6	13

=== International ===
Year	Team	Event	Result	GP	G	A	Pts	PIM
2022	Czech Republic	U17	7th	6	1	1	2	4
2023	Czech Republic	HG18	2nd place, silver medalist(s)	5	1	3	4	4
2024	Czech Republic	U18	6th	5	1	1	2	27
2025	Czech Republic	WJC	3rd place, bronze medalist(s)	7	4	3	7	6
2026	Czech Republic	WJC	2nd place, silver medalist(s)	7	2	7	9	2
Junior totals				30	9	15	24	43
