= Cole Hutson =

American ice hockey player (born 2006)

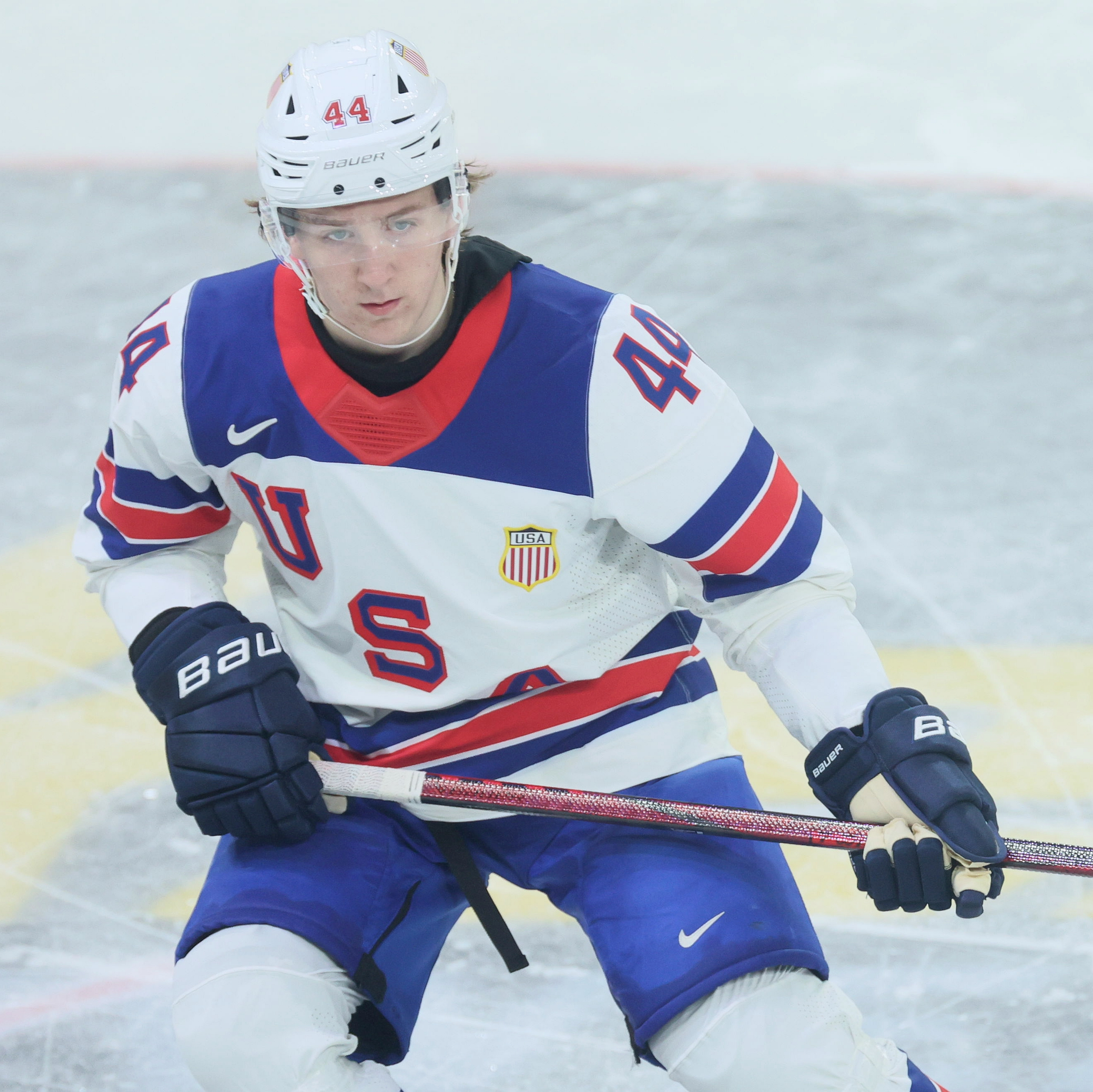
- Hutson in 2025
- Born: June 28, 2006 (age 20) St. Louis, Missouri, U.S.
- Height: 5 ft 10 in (178 cm)
- Weight: 165 lb (75 kg; 11 st 11 lb)
- Position: Defense
- Shoots: Left
- NHL team: Washington Capitals
- NHL draft: 43rd overall, 2024; Washington Capitals
- Playing career: 2026–present

Cole Hutson (born June 28, 2006) is an American-Canadian professional ice hockey defenseman for the Washington Capitals of the National Hockey League (NHL). He was selected in the second round, 43rd overall, by the Capitals in the 2024 NHL entry draft.

== Playing career ==
=== Junior ===
In the 2022–23 season, Hutson set the USA Hockey National Team Development Program (NTDP) record for single-season points by a defenseman with 68 points in 61 games. The following season, he totaled 15 goals and 51 points in 51 games, finishing his NTDP career as the all-time leader in program points by a defenseman, with his 119 points eclipsing the previous record of 111 set by J. D. Forrest over three seasons from 1997 to 2000.

=== College ===
During the 2024–25 season, in his rookie year of college ice hockey for Boston University, he recorded 14 goals and 33 assists in 38 games. He led all rookies in points (46) and assists (32), and led all NCAA rookies and defensemen in points per game (1.24). Following the season he was named to the First Team All-Hockey East and Hockey East All-Rookie teams, the Hockey East Rookie of the Year, the Tim Taylor Award winner, and an AHCA East First Team All-American.

=== Professional ===
On March 15, 2026, Hutson signed a three-year, entry-level contract with the Capitals. He made his NHL debut on March 18 in a 4–1 regulation win against the Ottawa Senators, recording his first career goal, an empty-net goal on the power play, in the game's final minute.

== International play ==
Medal record

Representing United States

Ice hockey

World Junior Championships
Gold medal – first place	2025 Canada	

World U18 Championships
Gold medal – first place	2023 Switzerland	
Silver medal – second place	2024 Finland	

Hutson represented the United States at the 2022 World U-17 Hockey Challenge where he recorded nine assists in seven games and won a gold medal.

Hutson represented the United States at the 2023 World U18 Championships, leading all defensemen with 12 points. He and the United States team dominated the event, going undefeated en route to a gold medal, with a final goal differential of +41. He again represented the United States at the 2024 World U18 Championships, where he recorded four goals and nine assists in seven games and won a silver medal. He subsequently won the IIHF directorate award for best defenseman, despite nearly missing the tournament due to a sprained ankle from which he had not fully recovered.

Hutson represented the United States at the 2025 World Junior Ice Hockey Championships, where he became the first defenseman to lead the tournament in points with 3 goals and 8 assists in 7 games, a national team record for most points by a defenseman at the World Juniors, on his way to winning the gold medal. On December 24, 2025, he was again selected to represent the United States at the 2026 World Junior Ice Hockey Championships. On December 27, 2025, during a preliminary round game against Switzerland, Hutson was struck in the back of the head by the puck. He remained on the ice for several minutes before being placed on a backboard and taken off on a stretcher. He returned during the quarterfinals and recorded one goal and one assist, but the United States was eliminated by Finland in overtime. With his four points in the tournament, he set a Team USA record for the most career World Juniors points (15) and assists (11) by a defenseman.

== Personal life ==
Hutson has three brothers, Quinn, Lane, and Lars. The former two also played college ice hockey at Boston University. Quinn is a forward under contract to the Edmonton Oilers, and Lane is a defenseman for the Montreal Canadiens.

== Career statistics ==
=== Regular season and playoffs ===
			Regular season					Playoffs
Season	Team	League	GP	G	A	Pts	PIM	GP	G	A	Pts	PIM
2022–23	U.S. National Development Team	USHL	32	4	21	25	52	—	—	—	—	—
2023–24	U.S. National Development Team	USHL	19	3	9	12	14	—	—	—	—	—
2024–25	Boston University	HE	39	14	34	48	64	—	—	—	—	—
2025–26	Boston University	HE	35	10	22	32	26	—	—	—	—	—
2025–26	Washington Capitals	NHL	14	3	7	10	8	—	—	—	—	—
NHL totals			14	3	7	10	8	—	—	—	—	—

=== International ===
Year	Team	Event	Result	GP	G	A	Pts	PIM
2022	United States	U17	1st place, gold medalist(s)	7	0	9	9	4
2023	United States	U18	1st place, gold medalist(s)	7	1	11	12	8
2024	United States	U18	2nd place, silver medalist(s)	7	4	9	13	6
2025	United States	WJC	1st place, gold medalist(s)	7	3	8	11	2
2026	United States	WJC	5th	3	1	3	4	0
Junior totals				31	9	40	49	20

== Awards and honors ==
Award	Year	Ref
College
First Team All-Hockey East	2025, 2026	
Hockey East All-Rookie Team	2025	
Hockey East Rookie of the Year	2025	
Tim Taylor Award	2025	
AHCA East First Team All-American	2025, 2026	
International
World U18 Championship – Media All-Star team	2023, 2024	
World U18 Championship – Best Defenseman	2024	

Awards and achievements
Preceded by Macklin Celebrini	Hockey East Rookie of the Year; 2024–25	Succeeded by Roger McQueen
Preceded by Macklin Celebrini	Tim Taylor Award; 2024–25	Succeeded by Ethan Wyttenbach
