= Felix Unger Sörum =

Swedish ice hockey player (born 2005)

- Born: 14 September 2005 (age 21) Trondheim, Norway
- Height: 6 ft 0 in (183 cm)
- Weight: 190 lb (86 kg; 13 st 8 lb)
- Position: Winger
- Shoots: Right
- NHL team (P) Cur. team Former teams: Carolina Hurricanes; Chicago Wolves (AHL); Leksands IF
- National team: Sweden
- NHL draft: 62nd overall, 2023; Carolina Hurricanes
- Playing career: 2023–present

Felix Unger Sörum (born 14 September 2005) is a Swedish professional ice hockey player who is a winger for the Chicago Wolves of the American Hockey League (AHL) as a prospect to the Carolina Hurricanes of the National Hockey League (NHL). He was drafted 62nd overall by the Hurricanes in the 2023 NHL entry draft.

== Playing career ==
Unger Sörum made his professional debut for Leksands IF of the Swedish Hockey League (SHL) during 2022–23 season where he appeared in seven games. He spent the majority of the season with Leksands IF's under-20 team, where he recorded ten goals and 36 assists in 42 regular season games. His 36 assists tied for the team lead. During the Anton Cup playoffs he recorded four goals and five assists in seven games, finishing second on the team in points and tied for first in goals during the postseason.

Unger Sörum was drafted in the second round, 62nd overall, by the Carolina Hurricanes in the 2023 NHL entry draft. He was the youngest member of his draft class at 17 years old. On 15 July 2023, the Hurricanes signed Unger Sörum to a three-year, entry-level contract.

During preseason training camp for the 2023–24 NHL season, he challenged for a roster spot, and was one of the final players cut. After not making the Hurricanes' roster, he was reassigned to Leksands IF for the 2023–24 SHL season. During his first full professional year, he recorded three goals and 12 assists in 35 regular season games and one goal and two assists in six playoff games.

== International play ==
Medal record

Men's ice hockey

Representing Sweden

World Championships
Bronze medal – third place	2024 Czech Republic	

World Junior Championships
Silver medal – second place	2024 Sweden	

World U18 Championships
Silver medal – second place	2023 Switzerland	

Unger Sörum represented Sweden at the 2023 World U18 Championships where he recorded two goals and eight assists in seven games and won a silver medal.

He represented Sweden junior team at the 2024 World Junior Championships where he played on the third line and power play and recorded one goal and five assists in seven games and won a silver medal.

On 10 May 2024, Unger Sörum was named to Sweden senior team's roster for the 2024 World Championship.

He then represented Sweden at the 2025 World Junior Championships where he tied for the team lead in scoring with one goal and nine assists in seven games. He was named a top-three player for team Sweden at the tournament.

== Personal life ==
Unger Sörum was born in Norway to a Norwegian father and Swedish mother, and moved to Sweden at the age of seven. While he does not hold a Norwegian passport, he speaks fluent Norwegian.

== Career statistics ==
=== Regular season and playoffs ===
			Regular season					Playoffs
Season	Team	League	GP	G	A	Pts	PIM	GP	G	A	Pts	PIM
2021–22	Leksands IF	J18	13	7	4	11	2	7	5	3	8	2
2021–22	Leksands IF	J20	18	5	2	7	0	2	0	0	0	0
2022–23	Leksands IF	J18	—	—	—	—	—	5	3	3	6	2
2022–23	Leksands IF	J20	42	10	36	46	4	7	4	5	9	2
2022–23	Leksands IF	SHL	7	0	0	0	0	—	—	—	—	—
2023–24	Leksands IF	J20	1	2	2	4	0	—	—	—	—	—
2023–24	Leksands IF	SHL	35	3	12	15	2	6	1	2	3	0
2024–25	Chicago Wolves	AHL	61	5	15	20	12	2	0	0	0	0
2025–26	Chicago Wolves	AHL	72	17	49	66	20	14	5	7	12	18
2025–26	Carolina Hurricanes	NHL	1	0	1	1	0	—	—	—	—	—
SHL totals			42	3	12	15	2	6	1	2	3	0
NHL totals			1	0	1	1	0	—	—	—	—	—

=== International ===
Year	Team	Event	Result	GP	G	A	Pts	PIM
2023	Sweden	U18	2nd place, silver medalist(s)	7	2	8	10	4
2024	Sweden	WJC	2nd place, silver medalist(s)	7	1	5	6	0
2024	Sweden	WC	3rd place, bronze medalist(s)	2	0	0	0	0
2025	Sweden	WJC	4th	7	1	9	10	0
Junior totals				21	4	22	26	4
Senior totals				2	0	0	0	0
