= Danny Nelson (ice hockey) =

American ice hockey player (born 2005)

- Nelson in 2026
- Born: August 3, 2005 (age 21) Maple Grove, Minnesota, U.S.
- Height: 6 ft 3 in (191 cm)
- Weight: 220 lb (100 kg; 15 st 10 lb)
- Position: Forward
- Shoots: Right
- NCAA team: Notre Dame
- NHL draft: 49th overall, 2023; New York Islanders

Daniel Nelson (born August 3, 2005) is an American college ice hockey forward for Notre Dame of the National Collegiate Athletic Association (NCAA). He was drafted in the second round, 49th overall, by the New York Islanders in the 2023 NHL entry draft.

== Playing career ==
On June 29, 2023, Nelson was drafted in the second round, 49th overall, by the New York Islanders in the 2023 NHL entry draft.

Nelson began his college ice hockey career at Notre Dame during the 2023–24 season. During his freshman year he recorded nine goals and 14 assists. He ranked for second on the team in shots on goal with 92, and ranked third on the team in assists and points. During the 2024–25 season, in his sophomore year, he recorded 13 goals and 13 assists. He ranked second on the team in goals and fourth in total points with 26. During the 2025–26 season, in his junior year, he recorded a career-high 13 goals and 16 assists.

On March 18, 2026, Nelson announced he would delay turning pro and return to Notre Dame for his senior year. On September 28, 2026, he was named team captain for the 2026–27 season. He became the first Fighting Irish player to be named a captain in multiple seasons since Steven Fogerty in the 2014–15 and 2015–16 seasons, and the 14th player in program history to be a captain in multiple seasons.

== International play ==
Medal record

Ice hockey

Representing the United States

World Junior Championships
Gold medal – first place	2024 Sweden	
Gold medal – first place	2025 Canada	

World U18 Championships
Gold medal – first place	2023 Switzerland	

Nelson represented the United States at the 2023 World U18 Championships where he recorded four goals and three assists in seven games and won a gold medal.

On December 16, 2023, he was named to the United States junior national team to compete at the 2024 World Junior Ice Hockey Championships. He recorded one goal and one assist in seven games and won a gold medal. He again represented the United States at the 2025 World Junior Ice Hockey Championships where he served as alternate captain and recorded four goals and two assists in seven games and helped Team USA win back-to-back gold medals for the first time in World Junior Championship history.

On October 16, 2025, he was selected to represent U.S. Collegiate Selects team at the 2025 Spengler Cup and won a silver medal.

On May 7, 2026, he was selected to represent the United States at the 2026 IIHF World Championship where he made his senior national team debut.

== Personal life ==
Nelson was born to Barb and Victor Nelson, and has two brothers, Henry and Sammy. Both of his brothers are also ice hockey players for Notre Dame.

== Career statistics ==
=== Regular season and playoffs ===
			Regular season					Playoffs
Season	Team	League	GP	G	A	Pts	PIM	GP	G	A	Pts	PIM
2021–22	Green Bay Gamblers	USHL	5	1	0	1	4	—	—	—	—	—
2021–22	U.S. National Development Team	USHL	7	4	3	7	10	—	—	—	—	—
2022–23	U.S. National Development Team	USHL	23	8	9	17	40	—	—	—	—	—
2023–24	University of Notre Dame	B1G	30	9	14	23	32	—	—	—	—	—
2024–25	University of Notre Dame	B1G	36	13	13	26	35	—	—	—	—	—
2025–26	University of Notre Dame	B1G	36	13	16	29	32	—	—	—	—	—
NCAA totals			102	35	43	78	99	—	—	—	—	—

=== International ===
Year	Team	Event	Result	GP	G	A	Pts	PIM
2023	United States	U18	1st place, gold medalist(s)	7	4	3	7	0
2024	United States	WJC	1st place, gold medalist(s)	7	1	1	2	0
2025	United States	WJC	1st place, gold medalist(s)	7	4	2	6	0
2026	United States	WC	8th	7	0	1	1	0
Junior totals				21	9	6	15	0
Senior totals				7	0	1	1	0
