= Oliver Moore =

American ice hockey player (born 2005)

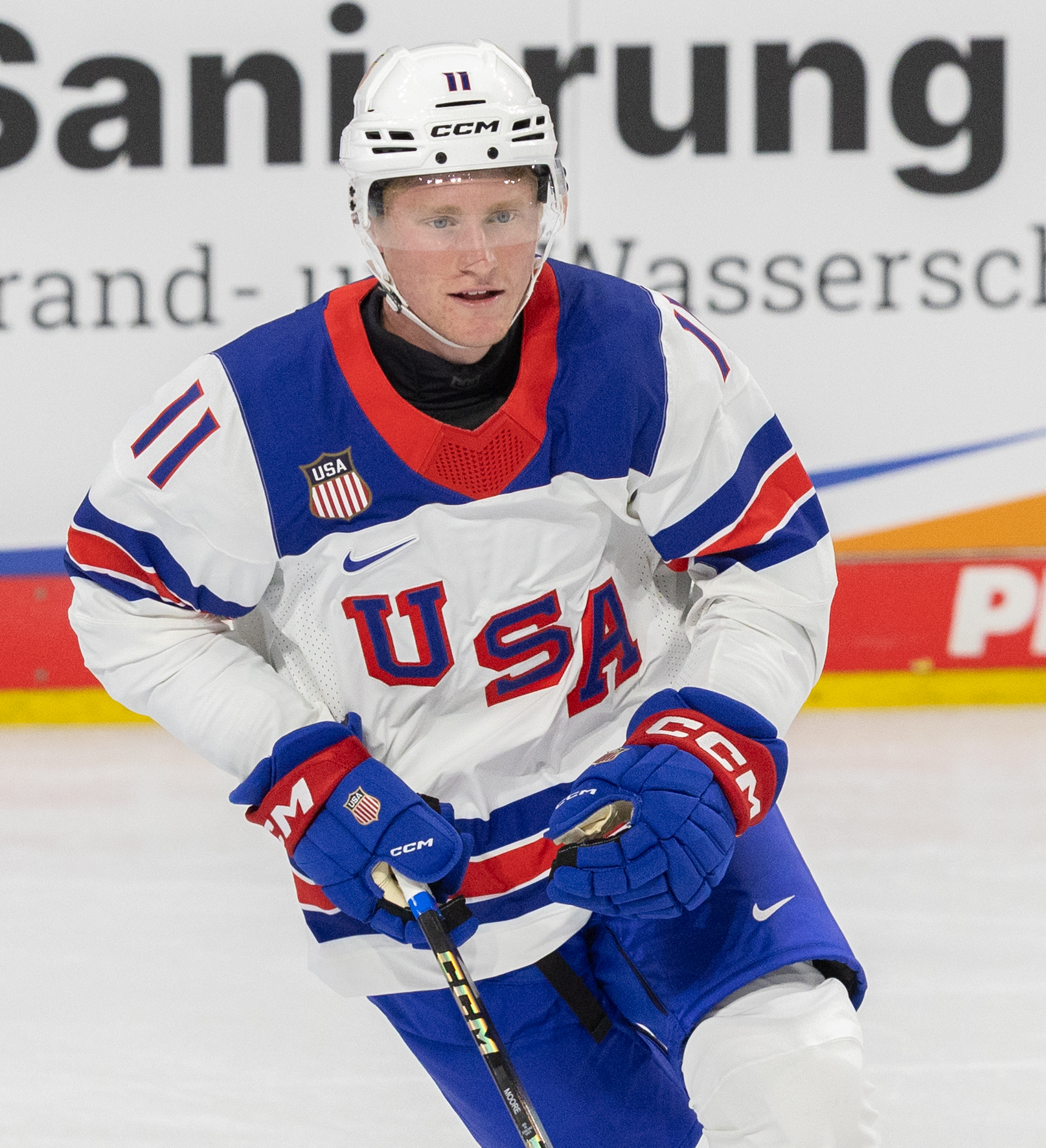
- Moore in May 2026
- Born: January 22, 2005 (age 21) Mounds View, Minnesota, U.S.
- Height: 5 ft 11 in (180 cm)
- Weight: 176 lb (80 kg; 12 st 8 lb)
- Position: Center
- Shoots: Left
- NHL team: Chicago Blackhawks
- National team: United States
- NHL draft: 19th overall, 2023; Chicago Blackhawks
- Playing career: 2025–present

Oliver Moore (born January 22, 2005) is an American professional ice hockey player who is a center for the Chicago Blackhawks of the National Hockey League (NHL). He was selected 19th overall by the Blackhawks in the 2023 NHL entry draft. Before turning pro, he played college hockey with the Minnesota Golden Gophers.

== Playing career ==
In his draft-eligible season, Moore showcased his offensive talent by scoring 31 goals and adding 44 assists, bringing his total to an impressive 75 points across 61 games.

Moore playing college hockey in November 2024 with the Minnesota Golden Gophers

Following his junior year with the Golden Gophers in the 2024–25 season, Moore ended his college career by signing a three-year entry-level contract with the Chicago Blackhawks on March 29, 2025. He appeared in 9 games in his debut season, recording 0 goals and 4 assists.

After initially being assigned to the Rockford IceHogs in the 2025–26 season, he was called up to replace an injured Jason Dickinson and made his season debut on November 3 against the Seattle Kraken. He scored his first NHL goal in a 5–1 win over the Detroit Red Wings on November 10. Moore suffered a season-ending lower-body injury on March 8, 2026. He tallied five goals and 14 assists in 51 games for the Blackhawks during the season.

== International play ==
Medal record

Men's ice hockey

Representing the United States

World Junior Championships
Gold medal – first place	2024 Sweden	
Gold medal – first place	2025 Canada	

World U18 Championships
Gold medal – first place	2023 Switzerland	

At the 2023 IIHF World U18 Championships, Moore delivered a standout performance by recording at least one point in every game of the tournament. His contributions were instrumental in Team USA’s success, culminating in a memorable moment during the gold medal game when he set up the overtime-winning goal, helping the United States capture the championship and solidifying his status as one of the tournament's top players.

On December 16, 2023, Moore was selected for the United States men's national junior ice hockey team to participate in the 2024 World Junior Ice Hockey Championships. In that tournament, he tallied one goal and two assists over seven games, contributing to a gold medal victory. He once again represented the U.S. at the 2025 World Junior Ice Hockey Championships, where he recorded one goal and four assists in seven games, helping secure another gold medal. His efforts were instrumental in Team USA achieving back-to-back gold medals at the IIHF World Junior Championship for the first time.

== Career statistics ==
=== Regular season and playoffs ===
			Regular season					Playoffs
Season	Team	League	GP	G	A	Pts	PIM	GP	G	A	Pts	PIM
2019–20	Totino-Grace High	USHS	25	7	28	35	6	2	0	1	1	0
2020–21	Totino-Grace High	USHS	17	17	21	38	6	—	—	—	—	—
2021–22	U.S. National Development Team	USHL	32	12	14	26	2	—	—	—	—	—
2022–23	U.S. National Development Team	USHL	23	8	17	25	12	—	—	—	—	—
2023–24	University of Minnesota	B1G	39	9	24	33	8	—	—	—	—	—
2024–25	University of Minnesota	B1G	38	12	21	33	6	—	—	—	—	—
2024–25	Chicago Blackhawks	NHL	9	0	4	4	4	—	—	—	—	—
2025–26	Rockford IceHogs	AHL	9	6	3	9	2	—	—	—	—	—
2025–26	Chicago Blackhawks	NHL	51	5	14	19	19	—	—	—	—	—
NHL totals			60	5	18	23	23	—	—	—	—	—

=== International ===
Year	Team	Event	Result	GP	G	A	Pts	PIM
2023	United States	U18	1st place, gold medalist(s)	7	4	5	9	0
2024	United States	WJC	1st place, gold medalist(s)	7	1	2	3	0
2025	United States	WJC	1st place, gold medalist(s)	7	1	4	5	0
2026	United States	WC	8th	8	0	3	3	0
Junior totals				21	6	11	17	0
Senior totals				8	0	3	3	0

== Awards and honors ==
Award	Year
College
All-Big Ten Freshman Team	2024

Awards and achievements
Preceded by Connor Bedard	Chicago Blackhawks first-round draft pick 2023	Succeeded by Artyom Levshunov
