= Axel Sandin-Pellikka =

Swedish ice hockey player (born 2005)

- Born: 11 March 2005 (age 21) Gällivare, Sweden
- Height: 5 ft 11 in (180 cm)
- Weight: 181 lb (82 kg; 12 st 13 lb)
- Position: Defence
- Shoots: Right
- NHL team (P) Cur. team Former teams: Detroit Red Wings; Grand Rapids Griffins (AHL); Skellefteå AIK
- NHL draft: 17th overall, 2023; Detroit Red Wings
- Playing career: 2022–present

Axel Sandin-Pellikka (born 11 March 2005) is a Swedish professional ice hockey player who is a defenceman for the Grand Rapids Griffins of the American Hockey League (AHL) while under contract to the Detroit Red Wings of the National Hockey League (NHL). He was drafted 17th overall by the Red Wings in the 2023 NHL entry draft.

== Playing career ==
Sandin-Pellikka played as a youth within Skellefteå AIK organization and made his professional debut in the Swedish Hockey League (SHL) during the 2022–23 season.

In the 2023–24 season, Sandin-Pellikka played his first full season in the SHL with Skellefteå AIK, recording 10 goals and 18 points from the blueline in 39 games. His 10 goals were the most of any under-19 skater and he was named the recipient of the Salming Trophy as the best Swedish-born defenseman in the SHL. Sandin-Pellikka helped Skellefteå AIK claim the Le Mat Trophy in winning the SHL championship, tallying 7 points in 14 playoff games.

On 6 May 2024, Sandin-Pellikka was signed to a three-year, entry-level contract with the Detroit Red Wings.

On 17 October 2025, Sandin-Pellikka scored his first NHL career goal for the Detroit Red Wings. in a game against the Tampa Bay Lighting.

== International play ==
Medal record

Representing Sweden

Ice hockey

World Junior Championships
Silver medal – second place	2024 Sweden	

World U18 Championships
Silver medal – second place	2023 Sweden	

Sandin-Pellikka represented Sweden at the 2024 World Junior Ice Hockey Championships and won a silver medal.

== Personal life ==
Sandin-Pellikka is of Finnish descent through his father. The surname Pellikka is of Karelian origin.

== Career statistics ==
=== Regular season and playoffs ===
			Regular season					Playoffs
Season	Team	League	GP	G	A	Pts	PIM	GP	G	A	Pts	PIM
2021–22	Skellefteå AIK	J18	14	2	6	8	8	—	—	—	—	—
2021–22	Skellefteå AIK	J20	14	1	2	3	6	—	—	—	—	—
2022–23	Skellefteå AIK	J18	—	—	—	—	—	5	2	1	3	2
2022–23	Skellefteå AIK	J20	31	16	20	36	64	2	0	1	1	0
2022–23	Skellefteå AIK	SHL	22	2	3	5	0	—	—	—	—	—
2023–24	Skellefteå AIK	SHL	39	10	8	18	17	14	2	5	7	2
2024–25	Skellefteå AIK	SHL	46	12	17	29	22	11	1	7	8	2
2024–25	Grand Rapids Griffins	AHL	2	0	1	1	2	3	0	0	0	0
2025–26	Detroit Red Wings	NHL	68	7	14	21	18	—	—	—	—	—
2025–26	Grand Rapids Griffins	AHL	6	2	1	3	0	8	1	3	4	2
SHL totals			107	24	28	52	39	25	3	12	15	4
NHL totals			68	7	14	21	18	—	—	—	—	—

=== International ===
Year	Team	Event	Result	GP	G	A	Pts	PIM
2022	Sweden	HG18	2nd place, silver medalist(s)	5	0	2	2	6
2023	Sweden	WJC	4th	7	0	1	1	6
2023	Sweden	U18	2nd place, silver medalist(s)	7	2	9	11	0
2024	Sweden	WJC	2nd place, silver medalist(s)	7	2	4	6	4
2025	Sweden	WJC	4th	7	4	6	10	6
Junior totals				33	8	22	30	22

== Awards and honours ==
Award	Year	Ref
SHL
Salming Trophy	2024	
Le Mat Trophy	2024	

Awards and achievements
Preceded by Nate Danielson	Detroit Red Wings first-round draft pick 2023	Succeeded by Michael Brandsegg-Nygård
