= David Edstrom =

Swedish ice hockey player (born 2005)

- Born: 18 February 2005 (age 21) Gothenburg, Sweden
- Height: 6 ft 3 in (191 cm)
- Weight: 193 lb (88 kg; 13 st 11 lb)
- Position: Centre
- Shoots: Left
- NHL team (P) Cur. team Former teams: Nashville Predators; Milwaukee Admirals (AHL); Frölunda HC
- NHL draft: 32nd overall, 2023; Vegas Golden Knights
- Playing career: 2022–present

David Edstrom (born 18 February 2005) is a Swedish professional ice hockey player who is a centre for the Milwaukee Admirals of the American Hockey League (AHL) as a prospect under contract to the Nashville Predators of the National Hockey League (NHL). He was drafted 32nd overall by the Vegas Golden Knights in the 2023 NHL entry draft.

== Playing career ==
Edstrom made his professional debut for Frölunda HC of the Swedish Hockey League (SHL) during the 2022–23 season, where he recorded two goals and two assists in 11 games.

Edstrom was drafted in the first round, 32nd overall, by the Vegas Golden Knights in the 2023 NHL entry draft. He signed a three-year, entry-level contract with the Golden Knights on 15 July 2023.

During the 2023–24 season, in his first full professional season, he recorded seven goals and 12 assists in 44 games. He tied for first among under-19 SHL players in assists (12), second in points (19), and third in goals (7).

On 8 March 2024, Edstrom was traded to the San Jose Sharks as part of a package in exchange for Tomáš Hertl. Just over five months later, Edstrom was again traded – alongside the same first-round pick involved in the Hertl trade – to the Nashville Predators as part of a package in exchange for Yaroslav Askarov.

== International play ==
Medal record

Representing Sweden

Ice hockey

World Junior Championships
Silver medal – second place	2024 Sweden	

World U18 Championships
Silver medal – second place	2023 Switzerland	

Edstrom represented Sweden at the 2023 IIHF World U18 Championships, where he recorded five goals and three assists in seven games and won a silver medal.

He represented Sweden at the 2024 World Junior Ice Hockey Championships, where he recorded three assists in seven games and won a silver medal.

== Career statistics ==
=== Regular season and playoffs ===
			Regular season					Playoffs
Season	Team	League	GP	G	A	Pts	PIM	GP	G	A	Pts	PIM
2021–22	Frölunda HC	J18	12	5	6	11	33	3	0	0	0	0
2021–22	Frölunda HC	J20	31	7	4	11	10	3	0	0	0	0
2022–23	Frölunda HC	J18	3	2	5	7	0	5	0	6	6	4
2022–23	Frölunda HC	J20	28	15	13	28	12	2	1	0	1	4
2022–23	Frölunda HC	SHL	11	2	2	4	0	—	—	—	—	—
2023–24	Frölunda HC	J20	1	0	0	0	2	—	—	—	—	—
2023–24	Frölunda HC	SHL	44	7	12	19	8	14	2	4	6	4
2024–25	Frölunda HC	SHL	39	7	12	19	10	3	0	0	0	0
2024–25	Milwaukee Admirals	AHL	—	—	—	—	—	4	0	0	0	0
2025–26	Milwaukee Admirals	AHL	53	8	14	22	28	—	—	—	—	—
SHL totals			94	16	26	42	18	17	2	4	6	4

=== International ===
Year	Team	Event	Result	GP	G	A	Pts	PIM
2023	Sweden	U18	2nd place, silver medalist(s)	7	5	3	8	6
2024	Sweden	WJC	2nd place, silver medalist(s)	7	0	3	3	0
2025	Sweden	WJC	4th	7	4	2	6	0
Junior totals				21	9	8	17	6

Awards and achievements
Preceded by Zach Dean	Vegas Golden Knights first-round draft pick 2023	Succeeded by Trevor Connelly
