= Teddy Stiga =

American ice hockey player (born 2006)

- Born: April 5, 2006 (age 20) Sudbury, Massachusetts, U.S.
- Height: 5 ft 10 in (178 cm)
- Weight: 193 lb (88 kg; 13 st 11 lb)
- Position: Left wing
- Shoots: Left
- NCAA team: Boston College
- NHL draft: 55th overall, 2024; Nashville Predators

Teddy Stiga (born April 5, 2006) is an American college ice hockey player who is a forward for Boston College of the National Collegiate Athletic Association. He was drafted 55th overall by the Nashville Predators in the 2024 NHL entry draft.

== Early life ==
Stiga attended Belmont Hill School in Belmont, Massachusetts where he played ice hockey, lacrosse, and soccer.

== Playing career ==
=== Junior ===
Stiga played for the USA Hockey National Team Development Program (NTDP) during the 2022–23 season, where he recorded 12 goals and nine assists in 49 games with the under-17 team. He also recorded eight goals and four assists in 27 games with the under-18 team. During the 2023–24 season, he recorded 36 goals and 43 assists in 61 games with the under-18 team. He ranked third on team in scoring with 79 points. He also recorded 18 goals and 20 assists in 27 games for the NTDP in the United States Hockey League (USHL). He primarily played on the top line with future Boston College teammate James Hagens.

Stiga was drafted in the second round, 55th overall, by the Nashville Predators in the 2024 NHL entry draft.

=== College ===
Stiga began his college ice hockey career for Boston College during the 2024–25 season. In his freshman year, he recorded 14 goals and 16 assists for 30 points in 36 games and was selected to the Hockey East All-Rookie team.

== International play ==
Medal record

Representing United States

Ice hockey

World Junior Championships
Gold medal – first place	2025 Canada	

World U18 Championships
Silver medal – second place	2024 Finland	

Stiga represented the United States at the 2024 IIHF World U18 Championships where he served as alternate captain and recorded six goals and five assists in seven games and won a silver medal. On April 30, 2024, in the final preliminary round game against Finland he recorded a hat-trick. He led the tournament with the best the plus-minus rating of +15.

In December 2024, Stiga was named to the United States men's national junior ice hockey team to compete at the 2025 World Junior Ice Hockey Championships. During the tournament he recorded one goal and two assists in six games and won a gold medal. He scored the game-winning overtime goal against Finland in the gold medal game.

On December 24, 2025, he was again named to the United States men's national junior ice hockey team to compete at the 2026 World Junior Ice Hockey Championships. During the tournament he recorded one goal and two assists in five games, and was eliminated in the quarterfinals by Finland.

== Career statistics ==
=== Regular season and playoffs ===
			Regular season					Playoffs
Season	Team	League	GP	G	A	Pts	PIM	GP	G	A	Pts	PIM
2022–23	U.S. National Development Team	USHL	27	8	4	12	12	3	1	0	1	2
2023–24	U.S. National Development Team	USHL	27	18	20	38	18	—	—	—	—	—
2024–25	Boston College	HE	36	14	16	30	34	—	—	—	—	—
NCAA totals			36	14	16	30	34	—	—	—	—	—

=== International ===
Year	Team	Event	Result	GP	G	A	Pts	PIM
2024	United States	U18	2nd place, silver medalist(s)	7	6	5	11	6
2025	United States	WJC	1st place, gold medalist(s)	6	1	2	3	0
2026	United States	WJC	5th	5	1	2	3	0
Junior totals				18	8	9	17	6

== Awards and honors ==
Award	Year
College
Hockey East All-Rookie Team	2025
