= 2023 Hlinka Gretzky Cup =

U18 international ice hockey tournament

Tournament details
- Host countries: Czech Republic; Slovakia
- Venues: 2 (in 2 host cities)
- Dates: 31 July–5 August 2023
- Teams: 8

Final positions
- Champions: Canada (24th title)
- Runners-up: Czech Republic
- Third place: United States
- Fourth place: Finland

Tournament statistics
- Games played: 18
- Goals scored: 151 (8.39 per game)
- Attendance: 35,933 (1,996 per game)
- Scoring leader: (Canada) Berkly Catton (10 points)

Official website
- hlinkagretzky.cz

The 2023 Hlinka Gretzky Cup was an under-18 international ice hockey tournament that was held from 31 July to 5 August 2023 at FOSFA Aréna in Břeclav, Czech Republic, and Pavol Demitra Ice Stadium in Trenčín, Slovakia.

== Preliminary round ==
All times are local (UTC+2).

=== Group A ===
Pos	Team	Pld	W	OTW	OTL	L	GF	GA	GD	Pts	Qualification
1	Czech Republic (H)	3	2	0	0	1	15	8	+7	6	Semifinals
2	United States	3	2	0	0	1	16	9	+7	6	Semifinals
3	Sweden	3	2	0	0	1	16	9	+7	6	Fifth place game
4	Germany	3	0	0	0	3	4	25	−21	0	Seventh place game

Source: hockeyslovakia.sk
(H) Host

31 July 2023; 15:30	Sweden	11–1 (2–0, 3–1, 6–0)	Germany	FOSFA Aréna, Břeclav; Attendance: 506

8 min	Penalties	12 min

31 July 2023; 19:00	Czech Republic	7–2 (1–0, 2–2, 4–0)	United States	FOSFA Aréna, Břeclav; Attendance: 2,197

8 min	Penalties	16 min
31	Shots	21

1 August 2023; 15:30	United States	6–1 (2–1, 2–0, 2–0)	Sweden	FOSFA Aréna, Břeclav; Attendance: 324

14 min	Penalties	12 min
39	Shots	23

1 August 2023; 19:00	Czech Republic	6–2 (1–0, 4–2, 1–0)	Germany	FOSFA Aréna, Břeclav; Attendance: 2,398

6 min	Penalties	8 min
41	Shots	19

2 August 2023; 15:30	Germany	1–8 (0–4, 1–2, 0–2)	United States	FOSFA Aréna, Břeclav; Attendance: 514

10 min	Penalties	4 min
15	Shots	43

2 August 2023; 19:00	Czech Republic	2–4 (0–2, 0–1, 2–1)	Sweden	FOSFA Aréna, Břeclav; Attendance: 3,126

18 min	Penalties	26 min
32	Shots	29

=== Group B ===
Pos	Team	Pld	W	OTW	OTL	L	GF	GA	GD	Pts	Qualification
1	Canada	3	2	0	0	1	25	13	+12	6	Semifinals
2	Finland	3	2	0	0	1	12	10	+2	6	Semifinals
3	Switzerland	3	2	0	0	1	9	9	0	6	Fifth place game
4	Slovakia (H)	3	0	0	0	3	8	22	−14	0	Seventh place game

Source: hockeyslovakia.sk
(H) Host

31 July 2023; 15:30	Canada	6–9 (3–2, 1–3, 2–4)	Finland	Pavol Demitra Ice Stadium, Trenčín; Attendance: 1,011

Game reference
12 min	Penalties	4 min
22	Shots	25

31 July 2023; 19:00	Slovakia	3–6 (1–2, 1–1, 1–3)	Switzerland	Pavol Demitra Ice Stadium, Trenčín; Attendance: 2,858

Game reference

Richard Rafaj
Goalies
Christian Kirsch

	0–1	04:22 – Reber (Ponzetto, Forget)
	0–2	18:06 – Ustinkov (Forget)
Kupec (Chovan, Kiss) – 19:20	1–2
	1–3	21:22 – Reber (Ponzetto, Ustinkov)
Šlank (Liščinský) – 32:21	2–3
	2–4	49:21 – Wey (Körbler)
	2–5	53:27 – Blessing (Tarchini) (PP)
Chovan (Pobežal) – 55:48	3–5
	3–6	59:59 – Antenen (Kurt, Meier) (PP)

18 min
Penalties
20 min
24
Shots
11

1 August 2023; 15:30	Finland	1–3 (0–0, 0–2, 1–1)	Switzerland	Pavol Demitra Ice Stadium, Trenčín; Attendance: 858

Game reference

Petteri Rimpinen
Goalies
Phileas Lachat

	0–1	29:23 – Ponzetto (Forget, Reber) (PP)
	0–2	36:09 – Bosson (Kurt, Tarchini)
Muhonen (Suoniemi) – 50:58	1–2
	1–3	51:14 – Wehrli (Antenen, Grossniklaus)

10 min
Penalties
8 min
10
Shots
15

1 August 2023; 19:00	Slovakia	4–14 (0–2, 3–6, 1–6)	Canada	Pavol Demitra Ice Stadium, Trenčín; Attendance: 4,149

Game reference

Richard Rafaj
Benjamín Varša
Goalies
Carter George

	0–1	00:22 – Catton (Misa, Wetsch)
	0–2	09:33 – Ritchie (Beaudoin, McQueen)
	0–3	22:05 – Misa
Zálešák (Pobežal, Chovan) – 22:58	1–3
Liška (Semančík, Feranec) – 25:40	2–3
	2–4	25:55 – Catton (Misa, Dickinson)
	2–5	30:21 – Misa (Mews, Marrelli) (PP)
	2–6	32:27 – Lindstrom (Mews, Martone)
	2–7	33:49 – Poirier (Josephson, Masse)
Beluško (Pobežal) – 35:19	3–7
	3–8	38:31 – Ritchie (Spence)
	3–9	40:10 – McQueen (Ritchie, Elick)
	3–10	40:38 – Ritchie (Beaudoin, McQueen)
	3–11	40:56 – Wetsch (Dickinson, Mews)
Pobežal (Fabuš) – 41:43	4–11
	4–12	42:23 – Masse (Poirier, Elick)
	4–13	57:03 – McQueen (Ritchie, Misa) (PP)
	4–14	59:39 – Martone (Misa)

10 min
Penalties
18 min
19
Shots
38

2 August 2023; 15:30	Switzerland	0–5 (0–2, 0–1, 0–2)	Canada	Pavol Demitra Ice Stadium, Trenčín; Attendance: 928

Game reference
8 min	Penalties	8 min
12	Shots	31

2 August 2023; 19:00	Slovakia	1–2 (0–0, 1–1, 0–1)	Finland	Pavol Demitra Ice Stadium, Trenčín; Attendance: 2,942

Game reference

Martin Haronik
Goalies
Petteri Rimpinen

Zálešák (Radivojevič, Pitka) (PP) – 20:14	1–0
	1–1	23:08 – Hemming (Suoniemi, Jokinen) (PP)
	1–2	59:57 – Suoniemi (Hemming, Saarelainen)

12 min
Penalties
12 min
18
Shots
21

== Final round ==
=== Bracket ===
Semifinals
4 August – Břeclav
A1 Czech Republic	8
B2 Finland	2
4 August – Trenčín
B1 Canada	7
A2 United States	2

Final
5 August – Břeclav
W1 Czech Republic	2
W2 Canada (OT)	3
Third place
5 August – Trenčín
L1 Finland	2
L2 United States	5

=== Seventh place game ===
4 August 2023; 15:30	Slovakia	4–6 (1–3, 1–1, 2–2)	Germany	Pavol Demitra Ice Stadium, Trenčín; Attendance: 1,948

Game reference
6 min	Penalties	20 min
41	Shots	16

=== Fifth place game ===
4 August 2023; 15:30	Sweden	3–2 OT (0–0, 2–2, 0–0); OT: (1–0)	Switzerland	FOSFA Aréna, Břeclav; Attendance: 420

Game reference
8 min	Penalties	6 min
24	Shots	19

=== Semifinals ===
4 August 2023; 19:00	Czech Republic	8–2 (2–1, 4–0, 2–1)	Finland	FOSFA Aréna, Břeclav; Attendance: 3,877

Game reference
2 min	Penalties	8 min
35	Shots	19

4 August 2023; 19:00	Canada	7–2 (1–2, 3–0, 3–0)	United States	Pavol Demitra Ice Stadium, Trenčín; Attendance: 1,845

Game reference
18 min	Penalties	20 min
34	Shots	24

=== Bronze medal game ===
5 August 2023; 17:00	United States	5–2 (3–0, 1–2, 1–0)	Finland	Pavol Demitra Ice Stadium, Trenčín; Attendance: 1,321

Game reference

Caleb Heil
Goalies
Kim Saarinen

Swanson (Pitner) – 00:13	1–0
Fellicio (Connelly, Zellers) (PP) – 01:57	2–0
Connelly – 09:31	3–0
	3–1	24:24 – Ruohonen (SH)
	3–2	27:05 – Vesterinen (Suoniemi, Hemming)
Stefanek (Monteiro) (SH) – 38:07	4–2
Park (Zellers, Bales) (PP) – 48:11	5–2

14 min
Penalties
16 min
21
Shots
23

=== Final ===
5 August 2023; 17:00	Canada	3–2 OT (0–1, 2–0, 0–1); OT: (1–0)	Czech Republic	FOSFA Aréna, Břeclav; Attendance: 4,711

Game reference

Carter George
Goalies
Jakub Milota

	0–1	08:09 – Titlbach (Benák)
Lindstrom (Martone) – 20:57	1–1
Catton (PP) – 29:17	2–1
	2–2	55:13 – Kubiesa (Benák) (PP)
Spence – 79:53	3–2

18 min
Penalties
6 min
40
Shots
31

== Final standings ==
Rank	Team
1st place, gold medalist(s)	Canada
2nd place, silver medalist(s)	Czech Republic
3rd place, bronze medalist(s)	United States
4	Finland
5	Sweden
6	Switzerland
7	Germany
8	Slovakia

== Statistics ==
=== Scoring leaders ===
Pos	Player	Country	GP	G	A	Pts	+/−	PIM

GP = Games played; G = Goals; A = Assists; Pts = Points; +/− = Plus–minus; PIM = Penalties In Minutes
Source: [hockeyslovakia.sk]

=== Goaltending leaders ===
(minimum 40% team's total ice time)

Pos	Player	Country	TOI	GA	GAA	SA	Sv%	SO

TOI = Time on ice (minutes:seconds); GA = Goals against; GAA = Goals against average; SA = Shots against; Sv% = Save percentage; SO = Shutouts
Source: [hockeyslovakia.sk]
