= Malcolm Spence (ice hockey) =

Canadian ice hockey player (born 2006)

- Born: September 22, 2006 (age 20) Mississauga, Ontario, Canada
- Height: 6 ft 1 in (185 cm)
- Weight: 191 lb (87 kg; 13 st 9 lb)
- Position: Left wing
- Shoots: Left
- NCAA team: Michigan
- NHL draft: 43rd overall, 2025; New York Rangers

Malcolm Spence (born September 22, 2006) is a Canadian college ice hockey player who is a left wing for the Michigan Wolverines of the National Collegiate Athletic Association (NCAA). He was drafted 43rd overall by the New York Rangers in the 2025 NHL entry draft.

== Playing career ==
Spence played youth hockey at the AAA level for the Mississauga Senators. During the 2021–22 season, he recorded 29 goals and 27 assists in 28 games. Following the season he was named the Greater Toronto Hockey League Player of the Year.

Spence was drafted second overall by the Erie Otters in the 2022 OHL Priority Selection Draft, after Michael Misa. On June 2, 2022, he signed with the Otters. During the 2022–23 season, in his rookie season, he recorded 16 goals and 26 assists in 64 games. On September 28, 2023, Spence was named an alternate captain for the Otters for the 2023–24 season. In his sophomore season, he recorded 19 goals and 43 assists in 66 games.

On October 22, 2024, Spence was selected to compete in the CHL/USA Prospects Challenge. During the 2024–25 season, he recorded 32 goals and 41 assists in 65 regular season games. During the playoffs he recorded four goals and five assists in nine games. Spence was drafted in the second round, 43rd overall, by the New York Rangers in the 2025 NHL entry draft.

On May 12, 2025, Spence committed to play college ice hockey at Michigan. During the 2025–26 season, in his freshman year, he recorded ten goals and 15 assists in 40 games. He recorded his first career goal and assist in the season opener against Mercyhurst on October 3, 2025.

== International play ==
Medal record

Representing Canada

Ice hockey

World U18 Championship
Gold medal – first place	2024 Finland	

Hlinka Gretzky Cup
Gold medal – first place	2023 Slovakia/Czech Republic	

On July 13, 2023, Spence was selected to represent Canada at the 2023 Hlinka Gretzky Cup. During the tournament he recorded four goals and three assists in five games and won a gold medal. During the tournament he recorded two goals and three assists in five games. During the championship game against the Czech Republic he scored the game-winning overtime goal with seven seconds remaining in the period to help Canada win the gold medal.

On April 16, 2024, Spence was selected to represent Canada at the 2024 IIHF World U18 Championships and served as alternate captain. During the tournament he recorded three goals and four assists in seven games and won a gold medal. On April 26, 2024, during a preliminary round game against Czechia, Spence scored a goal five seconds into the game, setting a record for the fastest goal to start a game in IIHF World U18 Championship history. He finished the game with two goals and one assist.

== Playing style ==
Erie assistant coach Wes Wolfe said of Spence:

He’s a highly competitive player who, in my opinion, has NHL habits already. He’s relentless on the forecheck. (He’s a) very responsible player who can play against the other team’s best players, while at the same time being able to contribute on offense.

One hockey scout said prior to the 2025-26 season "I think he’s got a little bit of grit in him and a little bit of jam, but he can skate. He can shoot it, and there’s enough touch with the puck that he’s not going to beat it up. He might not be a driver on a line, but he’ll be a really good complementary player on a line." His coach at Michigan, Brandon Naurato, said prior to the 2025-26 season:

What he does away from the puck — picks and setting up space for other guys, getting to the hard areas and disrupting — that’s why skill guys like playing with him...I feel like he’s the guy who can play with the two skill guys down the road that make space for them and has skill to make plays with them in the offensive zone.

Before the 2025-26 season, Corey Pronman of The Athletic rated him as the Rangers' top prospect and Peter Baugh of The Athletic rated him the Rangers' 2nd best prospect. Hockey News writer Stan Fischler rated him as the Rangers' 6th best prospect.

Before the 2026-27 season, Baugh and Vincent Z. Mercogliano rated him as the Rangers' 4th best prospect.

== Career statistics ==
=== Regular season and playoffs ===
			Regular season					Playoffs
Season	Team	League	GP	G	A	Pts	PIM	GP	G	A	Pts	PIM
2022–23	Erie Otters	OHL	64	16	26	42	14	—	—	—	—	—
2023–24	Erie Otters	OHL	66	19	43	62	26	6	1	3	4	2
2024–25	Erie Otters	OHL	65	32	41	73	57	9	4	5	9	6
2025–26	University of Michigan	Big Ten	40	10	15	25	44	–	–	–	–	–
OHL totals			195	67	110	177	97	15	5	8	13	8

=== International ===
Year	Team	Event	Result	GP	G	A	Pts	PIM
2022	Canada Black	U17	4th	2	0	1	1	0
2023	Canada	HG18	1st place, gold medalist(s)	5	2	3	5	6
2024	Canada	U18	1st place, gold medalist(s)	7	3	4	7	22
Junior totals				13	5	8	13	28
