= Cole Beaudoin =

Canadian ice hockey player (born 2006)

- Born: April 24, 2006 (age 20) Ottawa, Ontario, Canada
- Height: 6 ft 2 in (188 cm)
- Weight: 212 lb (96 kg; 15 st 2 lb)
- Position: Centre
- Shoots: Left
- NHL team (P) Cur. team: New York Rangers; Hartford Wolf Pack (AHL)
- NHL draft: 24th overall, 2024; Utah Hockey Club
- Playing career: 2026–present

Cole Beaudoin (born April 24, 2006) is a Canadian professional ice hockey player who is a centre for the Hartford Wolf Pack of the American Hockey League (AHL) as a prospect to the New York Rangers of the National Hockey League (NHL). He was drafted 24th overall by the Utah Hockey Club in the 2024 NHL entry draft.

== Early life ==
Beaudoin was born on April 24, 2006, in Ottawa. His family moved while he was four months old to Sweden and spent seven years split between Sweden and Switzerland while his father, Eric, continued to play professional hockey. At seven years old, they moved back to Ottawa.

== Playing career ==
On April 20, 2022, Beaudoin was drafted 10th overall by the Barrie Colts in the 2022 OHL draft. On June 3, he signed with the Colts.

Beaudoin played the 2022–23 OHL season for the Colts as a heavily used depth forward, recording 8 goals and 12 assists in 63 games. He was continuously used in the OHL playoffs, where they would lose to the North Bay Battalion in the Eastern Conference semifinals in seven games. He recorded 2 assists in 13 games throughout the playoffs.

Beaudoin entered the 2023–24 season with higher expectations in his National Hockey League (NHL) draft year. Improving his skating and fitness throughout the off-season, as evidenced by winning the run and bench-press competitions in Colts fitness training, he was expected to be a cornerstone piece for the Colts for the remainder of his OHL career. By December 2023, he was projected to be a late first-round, early second-round pick in the draft, already recording 10 goals and 8 assists in 24 games. He was described as a player who "[is] always going to dirty areas of the ice to constantly battle for the puck" and was projected as a serviceable player, similar to Zach Hyman and Matthew Knies, in a first or second line in the NHL. In January 2024, he was selected to play in the CHL/NHL Top Prospects Game. At the end of the season, he recorded 28 goals and 34 assists in 67 games. When the OHL's annual year-end coaches poll results were released, he was named the eastern conference's hardest worker, top penalty killer, and second-best defensive forward. On June 28, Beaudoin was drafted 24th overall by the Utah Hockey Club in the 2024 NHL entry draft, becoming the team's second-ever selection in franchise history. He was later signed to a three-year, entry-level contract with Utah on July 22, 2024.

Beaudoin started the 2024–25 season named as an alternate captain for the Colts. Participating in the Utah Mammoth's rookie training camp, he was named as one of the best players in the camp. He moved on to the main training camp, but was sent back to the Colts by the end of training camp. Beaudoin had a hot start to the beginning of the OHL season, recording seven goals and nine assists in 15 games. In December 2024, he and fellow Colts teammate Beau Akey were named to the Canada's junior team camp. He was named to Canada's roster on December 13. Throughout the rest of the season, he earned a spot on the power-play unit, recording seven goals and ten assists on the power-play throughout the season. By the end of the season, he had 22 goals and 29 assists in 52 games, helping the Colts clinch the top seed in the Central Division. The Colts made it to the Eastern Conference finals before being swept by the Oshawa Generals; he recorded 13 points in the playoffs.

On July 1, 2026, Beaudoin was traded to the New York Rangers alongside Sean Durzi and a 2027 third-round pick, in exchange for Vincent Trocheck. Beaudoin was assigned to the Hartford Wolf Pack, the Rangers' American Hockey League (AHL) affiliate, to begin the 2026–27 season. In his first AHL game for Hartford, he recorded a goal and two assists. He added two more assists in his second AHL game before being recalled to the Rangers on October 6. He made his NHL debut for the Rangers later that day in a 5–2 win against the New York Islanders.

== International play ==
Medal record

Men's ice hockey

Representing Canada

World Junior Championships
Bronze medal – third place	2026 United States	

World U18 Championships
Gold medal – first place	2024 Finland	

Hlinka Gretzky Cup
Gold medal – first place	2023 Czech Republic/Slovakia	

Beaudoin played for Canada under-18 team in the 2023 Hlinka Gretzky Cup, helping the team win gold.

He represented Canada at the 2024 World U18 Championships, where he recorded two goals and two assists in seven games and won a gold medal.

In December 2025, he was selected to represent Canada junior team at the 2026 World Junior Championships. During the tournament he recorded three goals and four assists in seven games and won a bronze medal.

== Playing style ==
During training camp in September 2026, Beaudoin described his playing style as follows:

A 200-foot centerman that is super reliable in the D zone. Making sure I have my guy, make sure I block shots, box out if that's on the PK. But then I also I feel like my offensive game progressed a lot, just being able to find guys, having to score goals, all that kind of stuff. I think that my 200-foot game has come around really well.

According to scouts, Beaudoin's main weakness is his skating, but as of September 2026 Beaudoin felt he had made significant improvement in that regard. Utah Mammoth's general manager Bill Armstrong praised his work ethic, saying that he could become a top 6 forward "just because he outworks people".

== Personal life ==
Cole's father Eric Beaudoin is a former NHL ice hockey forward who played in 53 games for the Florida Panthers.

== Career statistics ==
=== Regular season and playoffs ===
Bold indicates led league

			Regular season					Playoffs
Season	Team	League	GP	G	A	Pts	PIM	GP	G	A	Pts	PIM
2021–22	Nepean Raiders	CCHL	4	0	1	1	0	—	—	—	—	—
2022–23	Barrie Colts	OHL	63	8	12	20	20	13	0	2	2	6
2023–24	Barrie Colts	OHL	67	28	34	62	27	6	2	3	5	4
2024–25	Barrie Colts	OHL	52	22	29	51	4	16	4	9	13	8
2025–26	Barrie Colts	OHL	54	33	55	88	29	15	10	**19**	**29**	17
OHL totals			182	58	75	133	51	50	16	33	49	35

=== International ===
Year	Team	Event	Result	GP	G	A	Pts	PIM
2022	Canada	HG18	1st place, gold medalist(s)	5	3	3	6	4
2024	Canada	U18	1st place, gold medalist(s)	7	2	2	4	2
2025	Canada	WJC	5th	5	0	1	1	27
2026	Canada	WJC	3rd place, bronze medalist(s)	7	3	4	7	2
Junior totals				19	5	7	12	31

Awards and achievements
Preceded by Tij Iginla	Utah Hockey Club first-round draft pick 2024	Succeeded by Caleb Desnoyers
