= Carter George =

Canadian ice hockey player (born 2006)

- Born: May 20, 2006 (age 20) Thunder Bay, Ontario, Canada
- Height: 6 ft 1 in (185 cm)
- Weight: 196 lb (89 kg; 14 st 0 lb)
- Position: Goaltender
- Catches: Left
- NHL team (P) Cur. team: Los Angeles Kings; Ontario Reign (AHL)
- NHL draft: 57th overall, 2024; Los Angeles Kings
- Playing career: 2025–present

Carter George (born May 20, 2006) is a Canadian professional ice hockey goaltender for the Ontario Reign of the American Hockey League (AHL) as a prospect to the Los Angeles Kings of the National Hockey League (NHL). He was drafted with the 57th overall pick by the Kings in the 2024 NHL entry draft.

== Playing career ==
George played youth hockey for the Thunder Bay Kings of the Greater Toronto Hockey League (GTHL) for the 2020–21 and 2021–22 seasons. He was selected in the third round, 53rd overall, by the Owen Sound Attack in the 2022 Ontario Hockey League (OHL) Priority Selection. He played for the St. Marys Lincolns of the Greater Ontario Junior Hockey League (GOJHL) for the 2022–23 season before joining the Attack midway through the year.

In his first full season, George served as Owen Sound's starting goaltender. He was named OHL Midwest Division academic player of the month for December 2023, and was selected as one of 40 draft eligible prospects to play in the 2024 CHL/NHL Top Prospects Game. George finished the regular season with a 23–21–9 record and .907 save percentage. The league dubbed him "the OHL's busiest netminder," having stopped a league-high 1,744 shots. Owen Sound qualified for the playoffs, but were swept in four games by the Saginaw Spirit in the first round. The city's Sun Times noted George among the highlights of the year for the team, calling him "worth the price of admission alone." He was named to both the OHL's First All-Rookie Team and its Third All-Star Team, and subsequently to the CHL All-Rookie Team as well. In recognition of his achievements in school, George received the Bobby Smith Trophy as the OHL's scholastic player of the year and the Ivan Tennant Memorial Award as its top academic high school student; he was the first player since Adam Pelech in 2012 to earn both honours for the same season.

George was taken 57th overall in the second round of the 2024 NHL entry draft by the Los Angeles Kings. He was the third goaltender taken in the draft. On July 25, 2024, George signed a three-year entry-level contract with the Kings. George participated in pre-season camp activities with the Kings, starting at the Rookie Faceoff event for the Kings and playing in pre-season games, before returning to Owen Sound for the 2024–25 season. He made 47 appearances in net in the regular season, and faced more shots than any goaltender in the league (1,665), managing a .909 save percentage. He was widely credited as the main reason the rebuilding Attack qualified for the postseason, though they were ultimately swept in the first round by the London Knights. George was named to the OHL Second All-Star Team. Following the end of the junior season, he was recalled by the Kings and assigned to their AHL affiliate, the Ontario Reign. He made his professional debut on April 12, earning a 4–0 shutout victory against the San Jose Barracuda. Ultimately appearing in two games with the Reign during the AHL season, he had a 2–0–0 record and a .984 save percentage, and was then recalled to serve as the Kings' third goaltender during the 2025 Stanley Cup playoffs. The Kings were defeated in the first round by the Edmonton Oilers, ending his club season. George said afterward that "getting the pro experience, getting a taste of it" was "a great opportunity."

== International play ==
Medal record

Representing Canada

Ice hockey

World Junior Championships
Bronze medal – third place	2026 United States	

World U18 Championships
Gold medal – first place	2024 Finland	

Hlinka Gretzky Cup
Gold medal – first place	2023 Slovakia/Czech Republic	

In the summer of 2023, George made his international debut for Canada with the national under-18 team at the 2023 Hlinka Gretzky Cup. Appearing in all of the team's five games, he recorded a .891 save percentage, and made 31 saves in a 3–2 overtime victory against the Czech Republic in the gold medal game. George was invited to rejoin Team Canada for the 2024 IIHF World U18 Championships the following summer. Serving as the team's starting goaltender, he played a pivotal role in the team's deep run to the event final. He was named Canada's best player in three of its seven games, including the gold medal game. He was praised as "the difference" for the team in both the semi-final against Sweden and against the United States in the final, where Canada won the gold medal. In recognition of his play, George was given the Best Goaltender award by the IIHF directorate, and named to the tournament's Media All-Star Team.

George was named the starting goaltender for the national junior team at the 2025 World Junior Ice Hockey Championships, held on home ice in Ottawa. He recorded two shutouts in group stage play against Finland and Germany, and was generally credited as the strongest part of an otherwise underwhelming roster, which ultimately exited the tournament after a quarter-final loss to Czechia. Later in the year, George was invited to join the senior national team in preparations for the 2025 IIHF World Championship. He participated in the training camp and pre-tournament play, and remained as a non-rostered observer at the championship.

== Personal life ==
George's mother Tara is a curler, and was pregnant with him when she competed at the 2006 Scott Tournament of Hearts.

== Career statistics ==
=== Regular season and playoffs ===
			Regular season									Playoffs
Season	Team	League	GP	W	L	T/OT	MIN	GA	SO	GAA	SV%	GP	W	L	MIN	GA	SO	GAA	SV%
2022–23	St. Marys Lincolns	GOJHL	17	13	2	1	965	44	1	2.74	.910	—	—	—	—	—	—	—	—
2022–23	Owen Sound Attack	OHL	10	7	3	0	573	23	0	2.41	.924	—	—	—	—	—	—	—	—
2023–24	Owen Sound Attack	OHL	56	23	21	9	3,250	179	4	3.30	.907	4	0	4	235	16	0	4.08	.904
2024–25	Owen Sound Attack	OHL	47	17	22	6	2,705	151	0	3.35	.909	4	0	4	239	25	0	6.28	.855
2024–25	Ontario Reign	AHL	2	2	0	0	119	1	1	0.50	.984	—	—	—	—	—	—	—	—
2025–26	Owen Sound Attack	OHL	22	10	9	2	1,213	63	1	3.12	.899	—	—	—	—	—	—	—	—
2025–26	Sault Ste. Marie Greyhounds	OHL	24	13	8	3	1,450	58	3	2.40	.913	10	5	5	635	25	1	2.36	.910
AHL totals			2	2	0	0	119	1	1	0.50	.984	—	—	—	—	—	—	—	—

=== International ===
Year	Team	Event	Result	GP	W	L	T	MIN	GA	SO	GAA	SV%
2023	Canada	HG18	1st place, gold medalist(s)	5	4	0	0	266	10	1	2.26	.889
2024	Canada	U18	1st place, gold medalist(s)	6	6	0	0	360	14	0	2.33	.915
2025	Canada	WJC	5th	4	2	2	0	239	7	2	1.76	.936
Junior totals				15	12	2	0	865	31	3	2.11	.913

== Awards and honours ==
Award	Year	Ref
CHL
All-Rookie Team	2024	
OHL
Bobby Smith Trophy	2024	
Ivan Tennant Memorial Award	2024	
First All-Rookie Team	2024	
Third All-Star Team	2024	
Second All-Star Team	2025	
International
World U18 Championship Best Goaltender	2024	
World U18 Championship Media All-Star Team	2024	
