= Carson Wetsch =

Canadian ice hockey player (born 2006)

- Born: May 4, 2006 (age 20) North Vancouver, British Columbia, Canada
- Height: 6 ft 2 in (188 cm)
- Weight: 190 lb (86 kg; 13 st 8 lb)
- Position: Right wing
- Shoots: Right
- NHL team (P) Cur. team: San Jose Sharks; San Jose Barracuda (AHL)
- NHL draft: 82nd overall, 2024; San Jose Sharks
- Playing career: 2026–present

Carson Wetsch (born May 4, 2006) is a Canadian professional ice hockey right winger currently playing for the San Jose Barracuda of the American Hockey League (AHL) while under contract to the San Jose Sharks of the National Hockey League (NHL). He was selected 82nd overall by the Sharks in the 2024 NHL entry draft. Known for his physical, power-forward playing style, Wetsch previously served as captain of the Calgary Hitmen before joining Kelowna.

== Early life and development ==
Wetsch was born in North Vancouver, British Columbia, and grew up playing minor hockey in the Vancouver area. His early development included time in competitive programs that positioned him for progression into major junior hockey. Scouts identified him early as a physically mature skater with strong forechecking ability and presence around the net.

== Playing career ==
Wetsch began his WHL career with the Calgary Hitmen during the 2022–23 season, recording 21 points in 45 games. His breakout season came in 2023–24, when he scored 25 goals and 25 assists for 50 points. In 2024–25 he posted 33 goals and was named captain of the Hitmen, recognized for his leadership, communication skills, and involvement in community initiatives such as "Carson’s Crew," a program supporting underprivileged youth. During his time with Calgary, Wetsch was selected 82nd overall by the San Jose Sharks of the National Hockey League (NHL) in the third round of the 2024 NHL entry draft. He remains a prospect within the organization while continuing to play in the WHL.

Ahead of the 2025–26 WHL season, Wetsch was traded to the Kelowna Rockets. Shortly after joining the team, he was named the 30th captain in franchise history. In early games with Kelowna, he recorded multi-point performances and continued to be recognized for his physical style, forechecking pressure, and leadership maturity.

In May 2026, he was signed by the San Jose Sharks to a three-year entry-level contract.

== Playing style ==
Wetsch is described as a power forward with strong puck protection, net-front presence, and an aggressive forechecking approach. Standing 6 ft 2 in (1.88 m) and 201 lb, he excels along the boards and in tight offensive situations. Scouts also note his strong skating stride and ability to generate pressure in the offensive zone.

== Awards and honours ==
In June 2025, Wetsch received the Dayna Brons Honorary Award from Hockey Gives Blood for his commitment to blood donation causes.

== Career statistics ==
Medal record

Men's ice hockey

Representing Canada

World U18 Championship
Gold medal – first place	2024 Finland	

Hlinka Gretzky Cup
Gold medal – first place	2023 Slovakia/Czech Republic	

World U-17 Hockey Challenge
Silver medal – second place	2022 Canada	

=== Regular season and playoffs ===
			Regular season					Playoffs
Season	Team	League	GP	G	A	Pts	PIM	GP	G	A	Pts	PIM
2021–22	Calgary Hitmen	WHL	1	0	0	0	0	—	—	—	—	—
2022–23	Calgary Hitmen	WHL	45	10	11	21	22	5	1	0	1	0
2023–24	Calgary Hitmen	WHL	67	25	25	50	89	—	—	—	—	—
2024–25	Calgary Hitmen	WHL	68	33	19	52	68	11	5	1	6	8
2025–26	Kelowna Rockets	WHL	65	22	50	72	80	8	2	2	4	6
WHL totals			271	101	124	225	279	24	8	3	11	14

=== International ===
Year	Team	Event	Result	GP	G	A	Pts	PIM
2022	Canada Red	U17	2nd place, silver medalist(s)	7	2	2	4	12
2023	Canada	HG18	1st place, gold medalist(s)	5	1	2	3	0
2024	Canada	U18	1st place, gold medalist(s)	6	2	1	3	25
Junior totals				18	5	5	10	37
