= Tij Iginla =

Canadian ice hockey player (born 2006)

- Born: August 4, 2006 (age 20) Kelowna, British Columbia, Canada
- Height: 6 ft 0 in (183 cm)
- Weight: 182 lb (83 kg; 13 st 0 lb)
- Position: Forward
- Shoots: Left
- NHL team (P) Cur. team: Utah Mammoth; Tucson Roadrunners (AHL)
- NHL draft: 6th overall, 2024; Utah Hockey Club
- Playing career: 2026–present

Tij Iginla (born August 4, 2006) is a Canadian professional ice hockey player who is a forward for the Tucson Roadrunners of the American Hockey League (AHL) as a prospect to the Utah Mammoth of the National Hockey League (NHL). He is the son of Calgary Flames legend and Hockey Hall of Fame inductee Jarome Iginla. He was the first-ever draft pick of the Utah Mammoth, selected sixth overall in the 2024 NHL entry draft.

== Playing career ==
While attending RINK Academy in Kelowna, where as a 15-year-old playing at the under-18 level he recorded 48 points in 32 games, Iginla was drafted ninth overall by the Seattle Thunderbirds in the 2021 Western Hockey League (WHL) bantam draft.

Iginla scored his first WHL goal on October 14, 2022, against the Edmonton Oil Kings. In 48 games with the Thunderbirds in his rookie 2022–23 season, he scored 6 goals and 18 points. Seattle would win the Ed Chynoweth Cup as 2023 WHL champions, and would make it to the finals of the 2023 Memorial Cup, but Iginla would only play three games, all in the first round. In June 2023, Iginla was traded by the Thunderbirds to the Kelowna Rockets. Though not the reason for the move, it allowed him to live at home rather than with a billet family.

Entering the 2023–24 season, Iginla was not recognized as a top-level prospect for the upcoming 2024 NHL entry draft. He began the year with a "B" rating from NHL Central Scouting, indicating a projected second- or third-round pick, but after a torrid start to the season that saw him score 13 goals and 21 points in his first 12 games, he was upgraded to an "A" prospect, a likely first-round selection. In December 2023, Iginla was selected as one of 40 draft eligible prospects to compete at the 2024 CHL/NHL Top Prospects Game. He finished the year with 47 goals and 84 points in 64 games. The Rockets qualified to the WHL playoffs, facing the Wenatchee Wild in the first round. Iginla scored eight goals over the course of the series, which the Rockets won in six games, tying a franchise record for goals in a single playoff series. They were defeated by the Prince George Cougars in five games in the second round, and Iginla finished the postseason with nine goals and fifteen points in eleven playoff games.

Considered a likely selection high in the first round of the 2024 NHL entry draft, Iginla was taken sixth overall by the Utah Mammoth (the then Utah Hockey Club). As the team had been newly established with the personnel of the deactivated Arizona Coyotes, he was their first-ever draft selection, which he called "a huge honour," adding that it "would've been a surreal feeling to get picked by any team. But to be the first pick of a franchise is really cool."

On July 11, 2024, Iginla signed a three-year entry-level contract with the Utah Mammoth.

== International play ==
Medal record

Representing Canada

Men's ice hockey

World Junior Championships
Bronze medal – third place	2026 United States	

World U18 Championships
Gold medal – first place	2024 Finland	

Iginla made his international debut for Canada as a member of Team Canada Red at the 2022 World U-17 Hockey Challenge. He scored two goals and five assists in seven games and won a silver medal. He represented Canada at the 2024 IIHF World U18 Championships, scoring six goals and six assists in seven games, including a three-point performance in the gold medal game against the United States, where he scored the game-winning goal.

In December 2025, he was selected to represent Canada at the 2026 World Junior Ice Hockey Championships. During the tournament he recorded four goals and four assists in seven games and won a bronze medal.

== Personal life ==
Iginla is the son of Hockey Hall of Fame inductee Jarome Iginla and his wife Kara. His younger brother Joe plays for the WHL's Vancouver Giants and was drafted by the Calgary Flames in the 2026 NHL entry draft. His older sister Jade played for Brown University and was drafted to the Hamilton Havoc in the 2026 PWHL Draft.

== Career statistics ==
=== Regular season and playoffs ===
			Regular season					Playoffs
Season	Team	League	GP	G	A	Pts	PIM	GP	G	A	Pts	PIM
2021–22	Seattle Thunderbirds	WHL	3	0	1	1	4	—	—	—	—	—
2022–23	Seattle Thunderbirds	WHL	48	6	12	18	19	3	0	1	1	2
2023–24	Kelowna Rockets	WHL	64	47	37	84	35	11	9	6	15	0
2024–25	Kelowna Rockets	WHL	21	14	18	32	13	—	—	—	—	—
2025–26	Kelowna Rockets	WHL	48	41	49	90	29	9	7	5	12	4
WHL totals			184	108	117	225	100	23	16	12	28	6

=== International ===
Year	Team	Event	Result	GP	G	A	Pts	PIM
2022	Canada Red	U17	2nd place, silver medalist(s)	7	2	5	7	0
2024	Canada	U18	1st place, gold medalist(s)	7	6	6	12	0
2026	Canada	WJC	3rd place, bronze medalist(s)	7	4	4	8	0
Junior totals				21	12	15	27	0

== Awards and honours ==
Award	Year	Ref
WHL
Ed Chynoweth Cup champion	2023	
BC Division First Team All-Star	2024	

Awards and achievements
Preceded by None	Utah Mammoth first-round draft pick 2024	Succeeded by Cole Beaudoin
