= Henry Mews =

Canadian ice hockey player

- Born: March 9, 2006 (age 20) Ottawa, Ontario, Canada
- Height: 6 ft 1 in (185 cm)
- Weight: 190 lb (86 kg; 13 st 8 lb)
- Position: Defenceman
- Shoots: Right
- NCAA team: Michigan
- NHL draft: 74th overall, 2024; Calgary Flames

Henry Mews (born March 9, 2006) is a Canadian ice hockey player who is a defenceman for the Michigan Wolverines of the National Collegiate Athletic Association (NCAA). He was selected with the 74th pick overall in the 2024 NHL entry draft by the Calgary Flames.

== Playing career ==
Playing for the Toronto Jr. Canadians at the U16 AAA level in the 2021–22 season, Mews scored 14 goals and 64 assists for 78 points in 52 games. At the 2022 OHL Cup, he recorded one goal and five points in six games.

Mews was selected seventh overall in the 2022 Ontario Hockey League (OHL) Priority Selection Draft. During his first season in the OHL, the 2022–23 season, he scored 12 goals and 31 points in 55 games.

On January 10, 2025, Mews was traded to the Sudbury Wolves in exchange for defenceman Nolan Jackson and eight draft picks with three of the picks being conditional. Hours after the trade, he made his debut with the Wolves against the Niagara IceDogs. Mews scored a goal and had two assists for three points. After the Wolves were swept in round one of the 2025 OHL playoffs, he announced his commitment to the University of Michigan for the following season.

Mews made his debut for Michigan on October 3, 2025, against Mercyhurst, recording three assists. On November 3, it was revealed that Mews suffered a season-ending injury after taking a knee-to-knee hit. At the time of the injury, he had played in 10 games, recording nine assists.

== Personal life ==
Mews raised money for heart disease research during the 2023–24 OHL season, committing $11 for every assist he recorded, alongside matching from his family and agent.

== Career statistics ==
=== Regular season and playoffs ===
			Regular season					Playoffs
Season	Team	League	GP	G	A	Pts	PIM	GP	G	A	Pts	PIM
2022–23	Ottawa 67's	OHL	55	12	19	31	35	11	1	3	4	8
2023–24	Ottawa 67's	OHL	65	15	46	61	65	10	2	3	5	8
2024–25	Ottawa 67's	OHL	38	11	39	50	42	—	—	—	—	—
2024–25	Sudbury Wolves	OHL	30	3	29	32	46	4	0	2	2	4
2025–26	University of Michigan	B1G	10	0	9	9	6	—	—	—	—	—
NCAA totals			10	0	9	9	6	—	—	—	—	—

=== International ===
Medal record

Representing Canada

Men's ice hockey

World U18 Championships
Gold medal – first place	2024 Finland	

Hlinka Gretzky Cup
Gold medal – first place	2023 Czechia/Slovakia	

Year	Team	Event	Result	GP	G	A	Pts	PIM
2022	Canada White	U17	6th	6	2	6	8	8
2023	Canada	HG18	1st place, gold medalist(s)	5	1	6	7	2
2024	Canada	U18	1st place, gold medalist(s)	7	2	5	7	4
Junior totals				18	5	17	22	14
