= Ryder Ritchie =

Swedish-Canadian ice hockey player (born 2006)

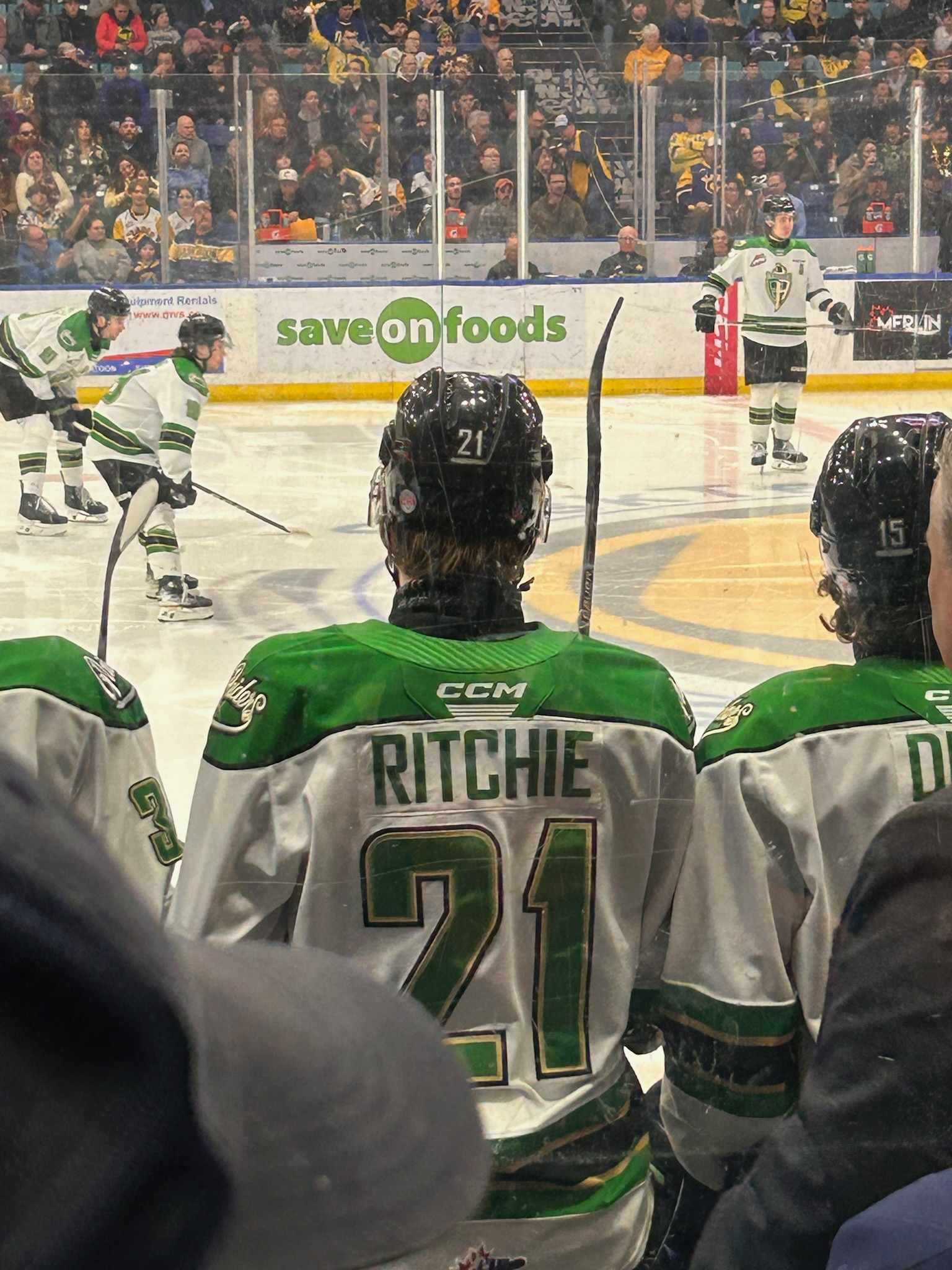
- Ritchie with the Prince Albert Raiders in 2024
- Born: August 3, 2006 (age 20) Calgary, Alberta, Canada
- Height: 6 ft 0 in (183 cm)
- Weight: 175 lb (79 kg; 12 st 7 lb)
- Position: Forward
- Shoots: Right
- NCAA team: Boston University
- NHL draft: 45th overall, 2024; Minnesota Wild

Ryder Ritchie (born August 3, 2006) is a Swedish-Canadian junior ice hockey player who is a forward for Boston University of the National Collegiate Athletic Association (NCAA). He was drafted in the second round, 45th overall by the Minnesota Wild in the 2024 NHL entry draft.

== Playing career ==
Ritchie was selected 14th overall in the 2021 Western Hockey League (WHL) prospects draft. In his rookie season in the WHL, the 2022–23 season, Ritchie scored 20 goals and 55 points in 61 games, and won the Jim Piggott Memorial Trophy as the WHL's rookie of the year. The Raiders would not qualify for the playoffs that year.

Ritchie was selected as one of 40 draft-eligible prospects to compete in the 2024 CHL/NHL Top Prospects Game. He suffered a hematoma in his quadriceps following a knee-on-knee collision in a December 15, 2023 game against the Kelowna Rockets and missed ten weeks of play, returning in February. He finished the regular season with 44 points in 47 games, a similar per-game rate to his rookie season. Prince Albert qualified to the WHL playoffs, claiming the final available berth, but lost to the Saskatoon Blades in five games in the first round.

At the 2024 NHL entry draft, Ritchie was selected in the second round, 45th overall, by the Minnesota Wild. On August 26, 2024, before the start of the 2024–25 season, his WHL rights were traded to the Medicine Hat Tigers in exchange for Tomas Mrsic and draft picks. In 53 games in the regular season, Ritchie managed 29 goals and 32 assists. In the team's first round playoff series against the Swift Current Broncos, he eclipsed his prior career playoff production with the Raiders in one fewer game. The Tigers then played his former team in the second round, and ultimately reached the WHL Finals, where they defeated the Spokane Chiefs to claim the Ed Chynoweth Cup. Ritchie had 9 goals and 9 assists in 18 postseason games. Ritchie and the Tigers then participated in the 2025 Memorial Cup, where they were defeated in the tournament final by the OHL champion London Knights.

== International play ==
Medal record

Representing Canada

Men's ice hockey

World U18 Championships
| Gold medal – first place | 2024 Finland | |

Hlinka Gretzky Cup
| Gold medal – first place | 2023 Czechia/Slovakia | |

Ritchie skated for Team Canada White at the 2022 World U-17 Hockey Challenge, recording four goals in six games. In the summer of 2023, he joined the national under-18 team for the first time at the 2023 Hlinka Gretzky Cup, where he scored three goals and nine points en route to a gold medal. The following spring, he again played with Team Canada at the 2024 IIHF World U18 Championships. Team Canada reached the championship final against the United States, where Ritchie scored the team's first goal of the game to tie it, before the United States retook the lead. Midway through the third period, American forward Trevor Connelly was assessed a five-minute major penalty for delivering an illegal hit to Ritchie's head. Team Canada scored three goals on the ensuing power play to take the lead for the first time, and would ultimately win the game 6–4. Ritchie called the tournament "definitely one of the highlights of my life and something that I'll remember forever."

== Personal life ==
Ritchie is the son of former NHL player Byron Ritchie, who played for the Carolina Hurricanes, Florida Panthers, Calgary Flames, and Vancouver Canucks in his eight season, 300+ game career. Although he was born in Canada, he is also a citizen of Sweden and spent parts of his childhood in Europe while his father played there. His uncle, Andreas Johansson, also played in the NHL.

== Career statistics ==
=== Regular season and playoffs ===
| | | | Regular season | | | | | Playoffs |
| Season | Team | League | GP | G | A | Pts | PIM | GP | G | A | Pts | PIM |
|---|---|---|---|---|---|---|---|---|---|---|---|---|
| 2022–23 | Prince Albert Raiders | WHL | 61 | 20 | 35 | 55 | 20 | — | — | — | — | — |
| 2023–24 | Prince Albert Raiders | WHL | 47 | 19 | 25 | 44 | 24 | 5 | 3 | 4 | 7 | 0 |
| 2024–25 | Medicine Hat Tigers | WHL | 53 | 29 | 32 | 61 | 23 | 18 | 9 | 9 | 18 | 22 |
| 2025–26 | Boston University | HE | 36 | 7 | 10 | 17 | 28 | — | — | — | — | — |
| WHL totals | | | 161 | 68 | 92 | 160 | 67 | 23 | 12 | 13 | 25 | 22 |

=== International ===
| Year | Team | Event | Result | GP | G | A | Pts | PIM |
|---|---|---|---|---|---|---|---|---|
| 2022 | Canada White | U17 | 6th | 6 | 4 | 0 | 4 | 4 |
| 2023 | Canada | HG18 | 1st place, gold medalist(s) | 5 | 3 | 6 | 9 | 0 |
| 2024 | Canada | U18 | 1st place, gold medalist(s) | 7 | 4 | 4 | 8 | 2 |
| Junior totals | | | | 18 | 11 | 10 | 21 | 6 |

== Awards and honours ==
| Award | Year | Ref |
WHL
| Jim Piggott Memorial Trophy | 2023 | |
| Ed Chynoweth Cup champion | 2025 | |
