= 2024 IIHF World U18 Championships =

Under-18 men's ice hockey tournament

2024 IIHF U18 World Championship

Tournament details
- Host country: Finland
- Venues: 2 (in 2 host cities)
- Dates: 25 April – 5 May 2024
- Teams: 10

Final positions
- Champions: Canada (5th title)
- Runners-up: United States
- Third place: Sweden
- Fourth place: Slovakia

Tournament statistics
- Games played: 29
- Goals scored: 215 (7.41 per game)
- Attendance: 52,958 (1,826 per game)
- Scoring leader: (United States) James Hagens (22 points)

Awards
- MVP: (United States) James Hagens

Official website
- www.iihf.com

The 2024 IIHF U18 World Championship was the 25th such event organized by the International Ice Hockey Federation. Teams participated at several levels of competition. These tournaments served as qualifications for the 2025 competition.

== Top Division ==
The Top Division tournament was played in Espoo and Vantaa, Finland, from 25 April to 5 May 2024.

=== Preliminary round ===
All times are local (UTC+3)

==== Group A ====
Pos	Team	Pld	W	OTW	OTL	L	GF	GA	GD	Pts	Qualification
1	United States	4	4	0	0	0	33	7	+26	12	Quarterfinals
2	Finland (H)	4	3	0	0	1	18	10	+8	9	Quarterfinals
3	Slovakia	4	1	0	0	3	14	19	−5	3 (Note: Slovakia 3 Pts, +8 GD; Latvia 3 Pts, 0 GD; Norway 3 Pts, –8 GD)	Quarterfinals
4	Latvia	4	1	0	0	3	10	18	−8	3	Quarterfinals
5	Norway	4	1	0	0	3	8	29	−21	3	Relegation round

Source: IIHF
(H) Host
Notes:

Schedule:

25 April 2024; 14:00	United States	9–0 (3–0, 3–0, 3–0)	Slovakia	Metro Arena, Espoo; Attendance: 789

Game reference

Nicholas Kempf
Goalies
Alan Lenďák

Hutson – 02:34	1–0
Eiserman (Ziemer, Hagens) (PP) – 10:34	2–0
Hagens – 19:19	3–0
Stiga (Hagens, Ziemer) – 20:59	4–0
Whipple (Rheaume-Mullen, Eiserman) – 34:42	5–0
Hagens (Stiga, Ziemer) – 37:07	6–0
Humphreys (Connelly, Hutson) – 47:18	7–0
Eiserman (Bednarik, Plante) – 49:58	8–0
Eiserman (Bednarik, Plante) – 58:23	9–0

2 min
Penalties
6 min
35
Shots
24

25 April 2024; 18:00	Latvia	1–3 (0–1, 0–1, 1–1)	Finland	Metro Arena, Espoo; Attendance: 4,029

Game reference

Nils Maurins
Goalies
Petteri Rimpinen

	0–1	11:18 – Hemming (Kiviharju, Helenius) (PP)
	0–2	36:06 – Ruohonen (Suoniemi, Nykyri)
	0–3	52:11 – Suoniemi
Osmanis (Serkins, Mūrnieks) (PP) (EA) – 58:31	1–3

10 min
Penalties
31 min
15
Shots
34

26 April 2024; 14:00	Slovakia	3–5 (1–3, 2–1, 0–1)	Latvia	Metro Arena, Espoo; Attendance: 583

Game reference

Martin Haronik
Goalies
Mikus Vecvanags

	0–1	08:43 – Sieradzkis (Klaucāns, Sārts)
Tomik (Radivojevič, Straka) – 09:24	1–1
	1–2	13:58 – Haritoncevs (Sieradzkis, Retenais)
	1–3	16:33 – Mūrnieks (Sieradzkis, Serkins) (PP)
Svrček (Radivojevič, Tomik) (PP2) – 28:28	2–3
Straka (Húževka) – 58:31	3–3
	3–4	36:33 – Macijevskis (Retenais, Haritoncevs) (PP)
	3–5	53:46 – Dilevka (Bērziņš, Naglis)

33 min
Penalties
10 min
34
Shots
28

26 April 2024; 18:00	Finland	7–0 (3–0, 4–0, 0–0)	Norway	Metro Arena, Espoo; Attendance: 4,618

Game reference

Kim Saarinen
Goalies
Marcus Walberg

Vesterinen (Nykyri, Jokinen) – 07:48	1–0
Hemming (Kiviharju, Helenius) (PP) – 09:24	2–0
Saarelainen (Helenius, Hemming) (PP) – 14:51	3–0
Vesterinen (Nieminen, Koivu) – 26:17	4–0
Sinivuori (Ruohonen, Vaisanen) – 31:52	5–0
Nykyri – 32:35	6–0
Hemming (Kiviharju, Helenius) (PP) – 39:46	7–0

6 min
Penalties
8 min
54
Shots
12

27 April 2024; 17:30	Norway	2–8 (0–4, 0–2, 2–2)	United States	Metro Arena, Espoo; Attendance: 1,006

Game reference

Amund Søndmør Martinsen
Goalies
Jack Parsons

	0–1	06:34 – Eiserman (Plante, Hagens) (PP)
	0–2	07:03 – Bednarik (Stiga)
	0–3	13:28 – Eiserman (Hagens, Plante) (PP)
	0–4	16:28 – Connelly (Mooney, Hutson)
	0–5	22:09 – Mooney (Hensler)
	0–6	34:12 – Humphreys (PS)
Eriksen (Vatne, Koblar) – 22:09	1–6
	1–7	46:54 – Hensler (Rheaume-Mullen)
	1–8	51:33 – Hagens (Ziemer, Stiga)
Dehli (Vatne, Engerbraten Kopperstad) (PP) – 56:52	2–8

33 min
Penalties
10 min
18
Shots
38

28 April 2024; 14:00	Slovakia	0–4 (0–4, 0–0, 0–0)	Finland	Metro Arena, Espoo; Attendance: 5,500

Game reference

Martin Haronik
Goalies
Petteri Rimpinen

0–1	06:27 – Hemming (Helenius, Saarelainen) (PP)
0–2	07:10 – Ruohonen (Suoniemi, Jokinen)
0–3	17:17 – Pikkarainen (Suoniemi, Vaisanen) (PP)
0–4	19:32 – Saarelainen (Helenius)

14 min
Penalties
31 min
8
Shots
41

28 April 2024; 18:00	United States	7–1 (3–0, 2–1, 2–0)	Latvia	Metro Arena, Espoo; Attendance: 825

Game reference

Nicholas Kempf
Caleb Heil
Goalies
Mikus Vecvanags
Dilans Birkans

Hutson (Stiga, Hagens) – 00:26	1–0
Connelly (Emery) – 05:34	2–0
Stiga (Connelly, Hutson) (PP) – 16:59	3–0
Mooney (Connelly, Emery) – 27:55	4–0
Eiserman (Stiga, Hensler) (PP) – 35:35	5–0
	5–1	38:53 – Serkins (Haritoncevs, Cjunskis)
Hagens (Plante, Eiserman) (PP) – 48:38	6–1
Connelly (Hagens, Ziemer) – 52:14	7–1

4 min
Penalties
8 min
37
Shots
25

29 April 2024; 17:30	Latvia	3–5 (0–3, 1–2, 2–0)	Norway	Metro Arena, Espoo; Attendance: 509

Game reference

Nils Maurins
Mikus Vecvanags
Goalies
Marcus Walberg

	0–1	07:44 – Finckenhagen (Olsen Brekke, Vatne) (PP)
	0–2	08:53 – Dehli (Aaram Olsen, Myhre)
	0–3	18:08 – Aaram Olsen
Serkins (Mūrnieks, Osmanis) (PP) – 22:14	1–3
	1–4	34:33 – Dehli (Sletmoe-Kjærnet)
	1–5	39:21 – Lafton (Vatne, Olsen Brekke) (PP)
Klaucāns (Dilevka, Uļjanskis) – 40:59	2–5
Uļjanskis (PP) – 49:04	3–5

4 min
Penalties
33 min
35
Shots
29

30 April 2024; 14:00	Norway	1–11 (1–5, 0–3, 0–3)	Slovakia	Metro Arena, Espoo; Attendance: 508

Game reference

Markus Walberg
Amund Martinsen
Goalies
Alan Lenďák

	0–1	01:01 – Nemec (Beluško, Chrenko)
	0–2	01:59 – Liščinský (Radivojevič)
	0–3	03:44 – Pobežal
Eriksen (Myhre) (PP) – 06:52	1–3
	1–4	11:45 – Ličko (Vrtiel)
	1–5	13:10 – Chovan (Šatan)
	1–6	27:11 – Pobežal (Straka, Radivojevič)
	1–7	33:13 – Chrenko (Fabuš)
	1–8	34:56 – Pobežal (Tomík, Kupec)
	1–9	48:32 – Vrtiel (Ličko, Kupec)
	1–10	53:47 – Pobežal (Radivojevič, Tomík) (PP)
	1–11	56:39 – Chovan (Chrenko, Šatan) (PP)

8 min
Penalties
2 min
13
Shots
59

30 April 2024; 18:00	Finland	4–9 (0–1, 3–5, 1–3)	United States	Metro Arena, Espoo; Attendance: 5,600

Game reference

Petteri Rimpinen
Kim Saarinen
Goalies
Nicholas Kempf
Jack Parsons

	0–1	15:53 – Stiga (Hagens, Ziemer)
	0–2	20:08 – Stiga (Hagens, Hutson)
	0–3	21:49 – Stiga (Hagens)
Suoniemi (Jokinen, Ruohonen) – 24:35	1–3
	1–4	27:53 – Bednarik (Mooney) (PP)
Jokinen (Helenius) – 29:00	2–4
	2–5	38:05 Hagens (Emery)
	2–6	39:26 – Hagens (Ziemer, Plante) (PP)
Saarelainen (Hemming, Jokinen) – 39:54	3–6
	3–7	40:08 – Hagens (Hutson, Emery)
	3–8	42:03 – Connelly (Hensler, Kempf) (PP)
Suoniemi – 50:45	4–8
	4–9	54:28 – Ziemer (Plante, Hutson) (PP)

8 min
Penalties
6 min
24
Shots
51

==== Group B ====
Pos	Team	Pld	W	OTW	OTL	L	GF	GA	GD	Pts	Qualification
1	Canada	4	4	0	0	0	31	7	+24	12	Quarterfinals
2	Czechia	4	1	1	1	1	9	12	−3	6 (Note: Sweden 2–3 (GWS) Czechia)	Quarterfinals
3	Sweden	4	1	1	1	1	15	12	+3	6	Quarterfinals
4	Switzerland	4	1	0	1	2	8	16	−8	4	Quarterfinals
5	Kazakhstan	4	0	1	0	3	10	26	−16	2	Relegation round

Source: IIHF
Notes:

Schedule:

25 April 2024; 15:00	Czechia	3–0 (1–0, 0–0, 2–0)	Switzerland	Trio Arena, Vantaa; Attendance: 442

Game reference

Jakub Milota
Goalies
Christian Kirsch

Curran (Daníček, Drančák) – 04:44	1–0
Poletín (Kubiesa, Jecho) (PP) – 43:32	2–0
Daníček (Curran, Drančák) – 49:03	3–0

2 min
Penalties
33 min
33
Shots
17

25 April 2024; 19:00	Sweden	3–6 (1–4, 2–1, 0–1)	Canada	Trio Arena, Vantaa; Attendance: 1,319

Game reference

Love Härenstam
Goalies
Carter George

	0–1	03:40 – Luchanko (Mews)
	0–2	09:15 – Spence
Fernström (Zetterberg, Freij) (EA) – 11:33	1–2
	1–3	15:24 – McKenna (Martone, Massé) (PP)
	1–4	17:09 – McKenna (McQueen, Elick)
Zetterberg (Fernström) – 20:48	2–4
Zetterberg (Eriksson) (PP) – 34:58	3–4
	3–5	35:42 – Schaefer (Martone, Greentree) (EA)
	3–6	58:43 – Wetsch (Iginla, Luchanko) (EN)

10 min
Penalties
51 min
29
Shots
26

26 April 2024; 15:00	Switzerland	5–2 (0–2, 2–0, 3–0)	Kazakhstan	Trio Arena, Vantaa; Attendance: 363

Game reference

Phileas Lachat
Goalies
Tanirkhan Alpysbayev

	0–1	06:11 – Kireyev
	0–2	09:36 – Alibek (Glukhikh, Britikov)
Meier (Cattin, Bosson) – 27:23	1–2
Körbler – 32:23	2–2
Tarchini (Meier, Cattin) – 43:28	3–2
Forget (Meier, Ustinkov) (PP) – 49:46	4–2
Muggli – 58:45	5–2

6 min
Penalties
10 min
43
Shots
17

26 April 2024; 19:00	Canada	6–0 (4–0, 0–0, 2–0)	Czechia	Trio Arena, Vantaa; Attendance: 954

Game reference

Carter George
Goalies
Jakub Milota

Spence – 00:05	1–0
Iginla (Elick) (SH) – 01:51	2–0
Iginla (Martone, McKenna) (PP) – 07:18	3–0
Wetsch (Beaudoin, Aitcheson) – 07:42	4–0
Spence (McKenna, Martone) – 47:19	5–0
McKenna (Martone, Spence) – 59:19	6–0

45 min
Penalties
58 min
33
Shots
26

27 April 2024; 15:00	Kazakhstan	1–7 (1–2, 0–2, 0–3)	Sweden	Trio Arena, Vantaa; Attendance: 698

Game reference

Tanirkhan Alpysbayev
Goalies
Love Härenstam

Alibek (Shipilin, Kazhibekov) (PP) – 05:32	1–0
	1–1	10:49 – Lindberg (Eklund, Annborn)
	1–2	15:21 – Eklund (Zetterberg, Eriksson) (PP)
	1–3	20:36 – Ihs Wozniak (Eklund, Eriksson) (PP)
	1–4	21:20 – Hesselvall (Nordlund, Berglund)
	1–5	44:15 – Berglund (Härenstam, Sahlin Wallenius)
	1–6	49:17 – Pettersson (Öhrqvist, Fernström)
	1–7	54:56 – Fernström (Pettersson, Eliasson)

37 min
Penalties
10 min
14
Shots
59

28 April 2024; 15:00	Sweden	2–3 GWS (0–0, 1–2, 1–0); OT: (0–0); SO: (0–1)	Czechia	Trio Arena, Vantaa; Attendance: 904

Game reference

Love Härenstam
Goalies
Jakub Milota

	0–1	25:58 – Sikora (Curran) (PP)
	0–2	32:38 – Jecho (Titlbach)
Eklund (Lindberg, Eriksson) – 39:32	1–2
Eriksson (Zetterberg, Sahlin Wallenius) (PP) – 53:47	2–2

Zetterberg (miss)
Fernström (miss)
Eklund (miss)
Shootout
Sikora
Titlbach
Benák
20 min
Penalties
8 min
28
Shots
31

28 April 2024; 19:00	Canada	8–1 (0–0, 7–1, 1–0)	Switzerland	Trio Arena, Vantaa; Attendance: 1,251

Game reference

Ryerson Leenders
Goalies
Christian Kirsch
Phileas Lachat

	0–1	22:47 – Körbler
Aitcheson (Josephson, Massé) – 22:57	1–1
McKenna (Brunicke, Desnoyers) – 25:55	2–1
Vanacker (Beaudoin) – 26:24	3–1
Martone (McKenna, Massé) (PP) – 34:02	4–1
Ritchie (Luchanko, Schaefer) (PP) – 35:29	5–1
Iginla (Luchanko, Ritchie) – 36:39	6–1
Martone (McKenna) – 39:42	7–1
Martone (Spence) – 57:23	8–1

8 min
Penalties
12 min
34
Shots
27

29 April 2024; 15:00	Czechia	3–4 OT (2–1, 1–1, 0–1); OT: (0–1)	Kazakhstan	Trio Arena, Vantaa; Attendance: 407

Game reference

Jakub Milota
Goalies
Abylaikhan Toleubai

Kos (Sikora, Kubiesa) – 13:37	1—0
Benák (Poletín) – 15:44	2–0
	2–1	19:26 – Bolshedvorsky (Sagymbayev, Simonov)
	2–2	23:15 – Korneyev (Al. Sarkenov, Bolshedvorsky) (PP)
Jecho (Titlbach) – 38:42	3–2
	3–3	52:45 – Perkin (Simonov)
	3–4	64:03 – Shipilin (Cherkassov)

8 min
Penalties
8 min
31
Shots
25

30 April 2024; 15:00	Switzerland	2–3 OT (1–1, 1–1, 0–0); OT: (0–1)	Sweden	Trio Arena, Vantaa; Attendance: 626

Game reference

Christian Kirsch
Goalies
Love Härenstam

Forget (Geisser, Johnson) – 07:47	1–0
	1–1	07:47 – Öhrqvist (Freij, Pettersson)
Meier (Bosson, Tarchini) (PP) – 28:57	2–1
	2–2	38:52 – Pettersson (Nordlund) (PP)
	2–3	61:05 – Lindberg (Pettersson, Fernström)

14 min
Penalties
16 min
25
Shots
24

30 April 2024; 19:00	Kazakhstan	3–11 (1–3, 0–5, 2–3)	Canada	Trio Arena, Vantaa; Attendance: 488

Game reference

Tanirkhan Alpysbayev
Danil Lytkin
Goalies
Carter George

	0–1	05:01 – Greentree (Josephson)
As. Sarkenov (Korneyev, Durglishvili) – 11:34	1–1
	1–2	15:42 – Iginla (Ritchie, Luchanko)
	1–3	17:12 – Massé (McKenna, Martone) (PP)
	1–4	23:02 – Beaudoin (Spence, Gill)
	1–5	24:40 – Mews (McKenna, Martone)
	1–6	27:40 – Desnoyers (Aitcheson, McKenna)
	1–7	30:26 – McKenna (Martone)
	1–8	36:18 – Martone (McKenna, Mews)
As. Sarkenov (Alibek, Shipilin) (PP) – 40:39	2–8
	2–9	43:45 – Marrelli (Greentree, Desnoyers)
	2–10	54:48 – McKenna (Elick, Martone) (PP)
As. Sarkenov (Alibek, Glukhikh) – 55:29	3–10
	3–11	56:37 – Brunicke (Spence, Wetsch)

6 min
Penalties
8 min
16
Shots
66

=== Relegation round ===
2 May 2024; 11:00	Norway	6–5 GWS (2–1, 2–2, 1–2); OT: (0–0); SO: (1–0)	Kazakhstan	Trio Arena, Vantaa; Attendance: 295

Game reference

Markus Walberg
Goalies
Abylaikhan Toleubay

Vatne (Molde, Eriksen) – 06:30	1–0
Eriksen (Vatne, Solheim) – 13:46	2–0
	2–1	17:15 – Korneyev (Cherkassov, Kireyev)
Eriksen (Vatne, Dehli) – 21:22	3–1
	3–2	28:41 – Bozhko (Korneyev, Kireyev) (PP)
	3–3	35:06 – As. Sarkenov (Durglishvili)
Aaram Olsen (Dehli, Myhre) – 36:15	4–3
Myhre (Dehli, Sletmoe-Kjærnet) – 46:37	5–3
	5–4	51:04 – Glukhikh (Simonov, Kazhibekov)
	5–5	54:10 – Shipilin (As. Sarkenov, Alibek)

Myhre
Vatne (miss)
Eriksen (miss)
Aaram Olsen (miss)
Dehli (miss)
Finckenhagen (miss)
Vatne
Vatne (miss)
Finckenhagen (miss)
Aaram Olsen (miss)
Vatne
Shootout
(miss) Alibek
Cherkassov
(miss) Kireyev
(miss) As. Sarkenov
(miss) Kazhibekov
(miss) Bozhko
Korneyev
(miss) Cherkassov
(miss) Korneyev
(miss) Al. Sarkenov
(miss) Kazhibekov
2 min
Penalties
2 min
32
Shots
28

=== Playoff round ===
Winning teams in the quarterfinals will be reseeded according to their ranking:

1. higher position in the group
2. higher number of points
3. better goal difference
4. higher number of goals scored for
5. better seeding coming into the tournament (final placement at the 2023 IIHF World U18 Championships).

Rank	Team	Group	Pos	Pts	GD	GF	Seed
1	United States	A	1	12	+26	33	1
2	Canada	B	1	12	+24	31	3
3	Finland	A	2	9	+8	18	5
4	Czechia	B	2	6	−3	9	7
5	Sweden	B	3	6	+3	15	2
6	Slovakia	A	3	3	−5	14	4
7	Switzerland	B	4	4	−8	8	6
8	Latvia	A	4	3	−8	10	8

==== Bracket ====
Quarterfinals
2 May
1A United States	4
4B Switzerland	0
2 May
2A Finland	1
3B Sweden	2
2 May
1B Canada	4
4A Latvia	0
2 May
2B Czechia	2
3A Slovakia	3

Semifinals
4 May
1 United States	7
6 Slovakia	2
4 May
2 Canada	5
5 Sweden	4

Gold Medal Game
5 May
1 United States	4
2 Canada	6
Bronze Medal Game
5 May
5 Sweden	4
6 Slovakia	0

==== Quarterfinals ====
2 May 2024; 12:00	United States	4–0 (0–0, 3–0, 1–0)	Switzerland	Metro Arena, Espoo; Attendance: 1,249

Game reference

Nicholas Kempf
Goalies
Christian Kirsch

Hagens (Ziemer) – 27:11	1–0
Humphreys – 35:22	2–0
Ziemer (Hagens) – 38:03	3–0
Hagens – 50:27	4–0

12 min
Penalties
12 min
35
Shots
17

2 May 2024; 14:45	Czechia	2–3 (1–1, 0–1, 1–1)	Slovakia	Trio Arena, Vantaa; Attendance: 380

Game reference

Jakub Milota
Goalies
Alan Lenďák

	0–1	01:36 – Tomík (Pobežal, Radivojevič) (PP)
Titlbach (Zielinski, Benák) 07:23	1–1
	1–2	34:29 – Maruna (Chovan, Šatan)
	1–3	42:38 – Maruna
Fibigr (Galvas, Benák) – 51:02	2–3

29 min
Penalties
6 min
29
Shots
31

2 May 2024; 17:00	Finland	1–2 (0–1, 1–1, 0–0)	Sweden	Metro Arena, Espoo; Attendance: 5,053

Game reference

Petteri Rimpinen
Goalies
Love Härenstam

	0–1	02:40 – Freij (Sterner, Orrsten)
Ruohonen (Suoniemi, Loponen) – 29:09	1–1
	1–2	36:34 – Berglund (Fernström, Pettersson)

8 min
Penalties
12 min
22
Shots
24

2 May 2024; 19:45	Canada	4–0 (2–0, 0–0, 2–0)	Latvia	Trio Arena, Vantaa; Attendance: 788

Game reference

Carter George
Goalies
Mikus Vecvanags

Massé (McKenna, Iginla) (PP) – 05:08	1–0
Ritchie (Iginla, Brunicke) – 12:12	2–0
Martone (Desnoyers, Brunicke) – 52:47	3–0
Luchanko (EN) – 59:00	4–0

4 min
Penalties
4 min
38
Shots
23

==== Semifinals ====
4 May 2024; 14:00	United States	7–2 (2–1, 3–0, 2–1)	Slovakia	Metro Arena, Espoo; Attendance: 2,665

Game reference

Nicholas Kempf
Jack Parsons
Goalies
Martin Haronik
Alan Lenďák

Stiga (Hensler, Hagens) – 03:08	1–0
Eiserman (Plante, Hagens) (PP) – 12:05	2–0
	2–1	12:45 – Nemec (Pitka, Chrenko)
Plante (Laurila, Bednarik) – 22:53	3–1
Hutson (Hagens, Ziemer) (PP) – 29:34	4–1
Skahan (Mooney, Humphreys) – 34:26	5–1
Eiserman (Plante, Hutson) (PP) – 40:33	6–1
Plante (Mooney, Emery) – 51:58	7–1
	7–2	59:18 – Chrenko (Maruna)

16 min
Penalties
12 min
40
Shots
22

4 May 2024; 18:00	Canada	5–4 (4–0, 1–2, 0–2)	Sweden	Metro Arena, Espoo; Attendance: 2,808

Game reference

Carter George
Goalies
Love Härenstam

Greentree (Gill, Josephson) – 02:18	1–0
McKenna (Martone, Schaefer) – 07:07	2–0
Iginla (Schaefer, Ritchie) – 08:10	3–0
Ritchie (Marrelli, Iginla) – 18:25	4–0
	4–1	23:53 – Nordlund (Eriksson)
Mews (Desnoyers, Martone) – 27:07	5–1
	5–2	28:29 – Nordlund (Freij, Eriksson)
	5–3	47:58 – Eklund (Nordlund, Sahlin Wallenius)
	5–4	54:19 – Orrsten (Gustafsson, Hesselvall)

33 min
Penalties
18 min
26
Shots
35

==== Bronze medal game ====
5 May 2024; 14:00	Sweden	4–0 (0–0, 0–0, 4–0)	Slovakia	Metro Arena, Espoo; Attendance: 2,501

Game reference

Love Härenstam
Goalies
Alan Lenďák

Pettersson (Freij, Fernström) – 49:16	1–0
Fernström (Berglund) – 56:24	2–0
Freij (Berglund, Pettersson) (PP) – 58:39	3–0
Eklund – 59:23	4–0

10 min
Penalties
8 min
29
Shots
36

==== Gold medal game ====
5 May 2024; 18:00	United States	4–6 (1–0, 2–2, 1–4)	Canada	Metro Arena, Espoo; Attendance: 5,800

Game reference

Nicholas Kempf
Goalies
Carter George

Humphreys (Hensler, Connelly) – 19:08	1–0
	1–1	25:31 – Ritchie (Schaefer, Mews)
Eiserman (Hutson) (PP) – 28:31	2–1
Hutson (Vansaghi) – 33:04	3–1
	3–2	35:40 – McKenna (Iginla, Mews) (PP)
	3–3	50:25 – McKenna (Iginla, Martone) (PP)
	3–4	53:40 – Beaudoin (Luchanko, Ritchie) (PP)
	3–5	54:19 – Iginla (McKenna, Mews) (PP)
Ziemer (Emery, Hutson) – 55:36	4–5
	4–6	58:42 – McKenna (George) (EN)

31 min
Penalties
8 min
35
Shots
25

=== Final standings ===
Pos	Grp	Team	Pld	W	OTW	OTL	L	GF	GA	GD	Pts	Final result
1	B	Canada	7	7	0	0	0	46	15	+31	21	Champions
2	A	United States	7	6	0	0	1	48	15	+33	18	Runners-up
3	B	Sweden	7	3	1	1	2	25	18	+7	12	Third place
4	A	Slovakia	7	2	0	0	5	19	32	−13	6	Fourth place
5	A	Finland (H)	5	3	0	0	2	19	12	+7	9	Eliminated in Quarterfinals
6	B	Czechia	5	1	1	1	2	11	15	−4	6	Eliminated in Quarterfinals
7	B	Switzerland	5	1	0	1	3	8	20	−12	4	Eliminated in Quarterfinals
8	A	Latvia	5	1	0	0	4	10	22	−12	3	Eliminated in Quarterfinals
9	A	Norway	5	1	1	0	3	14	34	−20	5	Avoided Relegation
10	B	Kazakhstan	5	0	1	1	3	15	32	−17	3	Relegated to the 2025 Division I A

Updated to match(es) played on unknown. Source: IIHF
(H) Host

=== Awards and statistics ===
==== Awards ====
- Best players selected by the directorate:
  - Best Goaltender: (Canada) Carter George
  - Best Defenceman: (United States) Cole Hutson
  - Best Forward: (United States) James Hagens
- Media All-Stars:
  - MVP: (United States) James Hagens
  - Goaltender: (Canada) Carter George
  - Defencemen: (Slovakia) Luka Radivojevic / (United States) Cole Hutson
  - Forwards: (United States) James Hagens / (Canada) Gavin McKenna / (Canada) Porter Martone

==== Scoring leaders ====
Pos	Player	Country	GP	G	A	Pts	+/−	PIM
1	James Hagens	United States	7	9	13	22	+14	4
2	Gavin McKenna	Canada	7	10	10	20	+9	0
3	Porter Martone	Canada	7	5	12	17	+12	6
4	Cole Hutson	United States	7	4	9	13	+14	6
5	Tij Iginla	Canada	7	6	6	12	+4	0
6	Brodie Ziemer	United States	7	3	9	12	+15	0
7	Cole Eiserman	United States	7	9	2	11	+0	2
8	Teddy Stiga	United States	7	6	5	11	+15	6
9	Max Plante	United States	7	2	9	11	+1	2
10	Trevor Connelly	United States	7	4	5	9	+7	31

GP = Games played; G = Goals; A = Assists; Pts = Points; +/− = Plus–minus; PIM = Penalties In Minutes
Source: IIHF

==== Goaltending leaders ====
(minimum 40% team's total ice time)

Pos	Player	Country	TOI	GA	GAA	SA	Sv%	SO
1	Nicholas Kempf	United States	318:09	10	1.89	123	91.87	2
2	Carter George	Canada	360:00	14	2.33	164	91.46	2
3	Love Härenstam	Sweden	424:47	16	2.26	178	91.01	1
4	Mikus Vecvanags	Latvia	187:32	12	3.84	113	89.38	0
5	Jakub Milota	Czechia	255:28	13	3.05	110	88.18	1

TOI = Time on ice (minutes:seconds); GA = Goals against; GAA = Goals against average; SA = Shots against; Sv% = Save percentage; SO = Shutouts
Source: IIHF

== Division I ==
=== Group A ===
The Division I Group A tournament was played in Frederikshavn, Denmark from 14 to 20 April 2024.

Pos	Team	Pld	W	OTW	OTL	L	GF	GA	GD	Pts	Promotion or relegation
1	Germany	5	4	1	0	0	25	11	+14	14	Promoted to the 2025 Top Division
2	Ukraine	5	4	0	1	0	18	10	+8	13	
3	Austria	5	2	1	0	2	21	14	+7	8	
4	Hungary	5	2	0	1	2	21	25	−4	7	
5	Denmark (H)	5	1	0	0	4	10	20	−10	3	
6	Japan	5	0	0	0	5	11	26	−15	0	Relegated to the 2025 Division I B

Source: IIHF
Rules for classification: 1) points; 2) head-to-head points; 3) head-to-head goal difference; 4) head-to-head number of goals scored; 5) result against closest best-ranked team outside tied teams; 6) result against second-best ranked team outside tied teams; 7) seeding before tournament.
(H) Host

=== Group B ===
The Division I Group B tournament was played in Tallinn, Estonia, from 14 to 20 April 2024.

Pos	Team	Pld	W	OTW	OTL	L	GF	GA	GD	Pts	Promotion or relegation
1	Slovenia	5	4	0	0	1	29	14	+15	12	Promoted to the 2025 Division I A
2	Lithuania	5	3	1	0	1	16	12	+4	11	
3	Estonia (H)	5	2	0	0	3	13	20	−7	6 (Note: Estonia 6 Pts, France 3 Pts, South Korea 0 Pts)	
4	France	5	2	0	0	3	15	19	−4	6	
5	South Korea	5	2	0	0	3	15	17	−2	6	
6	Italy	5	1	0	1	3	10	16	−6	4	Relegated to the 2025 Division II A

Source: IIHF
Rules for classification: 1) points; 2) head-to-head points; 3) head-to-head goal difference; 4) head-to-head number of goals scored; 5) result against closest best-ranked team outside tied teams; 6) result against second-best ranked team outside tied teams; 7) seeding before tournament.
(H) Host

== Division II ==
=== Group A ===
The Division II Group A tournament was played in Sosnowiec, Poland, from 17 to 23 April 2024.

Pos	Team	Pld	W	OTW	OTL	L	GF	GA	GD	Pts	Promotion or relegation
1	Poland (H)	5	5	0	0	0	34	5	+29	15	Promoted to the 2025 Division I B
2	Great Britain	5	4	0	0	1	30	11	+19	12	
3	Netherlands	5	3	0	0	2	18	19	−1	9	
4	Romania	5	1	0	1	3	8	25	−17	4	
5	Croatia	5	1	0	0	4	11	21	−10	3	
6	Serbia	5	0	1	0	4	6	26	−20	2	Relegated to the 2025 Division II B

Source: IIHF
Rules for classification: 1) points; 2) head-to-head points; 3) head-to-head goal difference; 4) head-to-head number of goals scored; 5) result against closest best-ranked team outside tied teams; 6) result against second-best ranked team outside tied teams; 7) seeding before tournament.
(H) Host

=== Group B ===
The Division II Group B tournament was played in Puigcerdà, Spain, from 17 to 23 March 2024.

Pos	Team	Pld	W	OTW	OTL	L	GF	GA	GD	Pts	Promotion or relegation
1	China	5	5	0	0	0	30	15	+15	15	Promoted to the 2025 Division II A
2	Spain (H)	5	3	0	1	1	33	14	+19	10	
3	Bulgaria	5	2	1	0	2	23	22	+1	8	
4	Australia	5	2	0	1	2	23	23	0	7	
5	Chinese Taipei	5	1	1	0	3	15	26	−11	5	
6	Israel	5	0	0	0	5	18	42	−24	0	Relegated to the 2025 Division III A

Source: IIHF
Rules for classification: 1) points; 2) head-to-head points; 3) head-to-head goal difference; 4) head-to-head number of goals scored; 5) result against closest best-ranked team outside tied teams; 6) result against second-best ranked team outside tied teams; 7) seeding before tournament.
(H) Host

== Division III ==
=== Group A ===
The Division III Group A tournament was played in Istanbul, Turkey, from 4 to 10 March 2024.

Pos	Team	Pld	W	OTW	OTL	L	GF	GA	GD	Pts	Promotion or relegation
1	Belgium	5	5	0	0	0	33	11	+22	15	Promoted to the 2025 Division II B
2	Mexico	5	4	0	0	1	24	15	+9	12	
3	Turkey (H)	5	3	0	0	2	38	19	+19	9	
4	Iceland	5	2	0	0	3	26	19	+7	6	
5	New Zealand	5	1	0	0	4	21	31	−10	3	
6	Bosnia and Herzegovina	5	0	0	0	5	7	54	−47	0	Relegated to the 2025 Division III B

Source: IIHF
Rules for classification: 1) points; 2) head-to-head points; 3) head-to-head goal difference; 4) head-to-head number of goals scored; 5) result against closest best-ranked team outside tied teams; 6) result against second-best ranked team outside tied teams; 7) seeding before tournament.
(H) Host

=== Group B ===
The Division III Group B tournament was played in Cape Town, South Africa, from 4 to 7 March 2024.

Pos	Team	Pld	W	OTW	OTL	L	GF	GA	GD	Pts	Promotion
1	Hong Kong	3	2	0	0	1	20	7	+13	6 (Note: Hong Kong 3 Pts, +3 GD; Turkmenistan 3 Pts, 0 GD; Thailand 3 Pts, –3 GD)	Promoted to the 2025 Division III A
2	Turkmenistan	3	2	0	0	1	16	12	+4	6	
3	Thailand	3	2	0	0	1	17	10	+7	6	
4	South Africa (H)	3	0	0	0	3	5	29	−24	0	

Source: IIHF
Rules for classification: 1) points; 2) head-to-head points; 3) head-to-head goal difference; 4) head-to-head number of goals scored; 5) result against closest best-ranked team outside tied teams; 6) result against second-best ranked team outside tied teams; 7) seeding before tournament.
(H) Host
