= Petteri Lehto =

Finnish ice hockey player

- Born: 13 March 1961 (age 64); Turku, FIN
- Height: 6 ft 0 in (183 cm)
- Weight: 185 lb (84 kg; 13 st 3 lb)
- Position: Defence
- Shot: Right
- Played for: Pittsburgh Penguins; TPS; Lukko; KalPa
- National team: Finland
- NHL draft: Undrafted
- Playing career: 1980–1990

Mika Jukka Petteri Lehto (born 13 March 1961) is a Finnish retired professional ice hockey player and agent.

== Career ==
He played 6 games in the National Hockey League with the Pittsburgh Penguins during the 1984–85 season. The rest of his career, which lasted from 1979 to 1990, was spent in the Finnish SM-liiga, where he played for TPS, and KalPa. Internationally, Lehto played for the Finnish national team at the 1984 Winter Olympics.

== Post-playing career ==
After his playing career, Lehto became an NHL agent. His clientele as an agent includes Patrik Laine, Mikko Rantanen, Kaapo Kakko, Aron Kiviharju and Emil Hemming among others.

== Personal ==
His brother Joni is a scout for the Colorado Avalanche.

== Career statistics ==
=== Regular season and playoffs ===
			Regular season					Playoffs
Season	Team	League	GP	G	A	Pts	PIM	GP	G	A	Pts	PIM
1977–78	TPS	FIN U20	24	4	5	9	36	—	—	—	—	—
1978–79	TPS	FIN U20	25	5	14	19	92	—	—	—	—	—
1978–79	TPS	SM-l	—	—	—	—	—	2	0	0	0	0
1979–80	Melville Millionaires	SJHL	53	10	44	54	188	—	—	—	—	—
1980–81	TPS	FIN U20	15	7	6	13	36	—	—	—	—	—
1980–81	TPS	SM-l	31	0	2	2	16	—	—	—	—	—
1981–82	Lukko	SM-l	34	3	8	11	24	—	—	—	—	—
1982–83	TPS	SM-l	33	3	6	9	42	3	0	0	0	2
1983–84	TPS	SM-l	36	8	10	18	32	10	2	1	3	8
1984–85	Pittsburgh Penguins	NHL	6	0	0	0	4	—	—	—	—	—
1984–85	Baltimore Skipjacks	AHL	52	3	18	21	55	—	—	—	—	—
1985–86	TPS	SM-l	33	2	8	10	60	7	0	2	2	10
1986–87	TPS	SM-l	22	1	5	6	30	—	—	—	—	—
1987–88	KalPa	SM-l	32	3	11	14	32	—	—	—	—	—
1988–89	TPS	SM-l	40	2	9	11	20	10	0	0	0	4
1989–90	TPS	SM-l	37	1	3	4	27	9	0	0	0	6
SM-l totals			298	23	62	85	283	41	2	3	5	30
NHL totals			6	0	0	0	4	—	—	—	—	—

=== International ===
Year	Team	Event	GP	G	A	Pts	PIM
1979	Finland	EJC	5	3	1	4	2
1984	Finland	OLY	6	2	2	4	10
Junior totals			5	3	1	4	2
Senior totals			6	2	2	4	10
