= Václav Benák =

Czech ice hockey player

- Born: August 30, 1978 (age 47) Sokolov, Czechoslovakia
- Height: 5 ft 10 in (178 cm)
- Weight: 192 lb (87 kg; 13 st 10 lb)
- Position: Defence
- Shot: Left
- Czech Extraliga team: HC Plzeň
- Playing career: 1995–2020

Václav Benák (born August 30, 1978) is a Czech professional ice hockey defenceman. He played with HC Plzeň in the Czech Extraliga during the 2010–11 Czech Extraliga season.

Benák previously played for HC Sparta Praha, HC České Budějovice, IHC Písek, HC Znojemští Orli and HK36 Skalica.

== Personal life ==
Benák is the father of ice hockey player Adam Benák.

== Career statistics ==
			Regular season					Playoffs
Season	Team	League	GP	G	A	Pts	PIM	GP	G	A	Pts	PIM
1994–95	HC Sparta Praha	Czech	—	—	—	—	—	—	—	—	—	—
1995–96	HC Sparta Praha U20	Czech U20	33	5	9	14	—	—	—	—	—	—
1995–96	HC Sparta Praha	Czech	—	—	—	—	—	1	0	0	0	0
1996–97	HC Sparta Praha U20	Czech U20	29	5	4	9	—	—	—	—	—	—
1996–97	HC Sparta Praha	Czech	2	0	0	0	2	5	2	0	2	0
1996–97	HC Baník Sokolov	Czech2	24	2	2	4	—	—	—	—	—	—
1997–98	HC Sparta Praha	Czech	4	0	1	1	0	—	—	—	—	—
1997–98	HC Berounští Medvědi	Czech2	7	0	0	0	0	—	—	—	—	—
1997–98	HC Ytong Brno	Czech2	33	2	5	7	—	—	—	—	—	—
1998–99	HC Sparta Praha	Czech	6	0	0	0	0	—	—	—	—	—
1998–99	IHC Písek	Czech2	25	3	3	6	—	—	—	—	—	—
1999–00	HC České Budějovice	Czech	3	0	0	0	0	3	0	1	1	0
1999–00	IHC Písek	Czech2	40	6	20	26	40	6	0	1	1	35
2000–01	HC České Budějovice	Czech	49	3	8	11	24	—	—	—	—	—
2001–02	HC Plzeň	Czech	10	0	0	0	35	—	—	—	—	—
2001–02	HC Znojemští Orli	Czech	32	1	3	4	28	3	0	0	0	27
2001–02	IHC Písek	Czech2	6	0	2	2	8	—	—	—	—	—
2002–03	HC Znojemští Orli	Czech	44	8	8	16	36	6	1	0	1	4
2003–04	HC Znojemští Orli	Czech	46	4	6	10	36	7	0	1	1	4
2004–05	HC Znojemští Orli	Czech	47	5	8	13	44	—	—	—	—	—
2005–06	HK 36 Skalica	Slovak	54	10	14	24	68	7	0	2	2	8
2006–07	HC Plzeň	Czech	47	3	8	11	82	—	—	—	—	—
2006–07	HC Davos	NLA	—	—	—	—	—	16	0	3	3	36
2007–08	HC Plzeň	Czech	50	7	17	24	88	4	0	2	2	6
2008–09	HC Plzeň	Czech	52	5	19	24	72	17	0	2	2	8
2009–10	HC Plzeň 1929	Czech	52	1	7	8	42	2	0	0	0	0
2010–11	HC Plzeň 1929	Czech	43	2	2	4	30	4	0	0	0	4
2011–12	HC Pardubice	Czech	51	0	9	9	79	15	1	3	4	12
2012–13	HC Pardubice	Czech	50	5	20	25	50	5	0	2	2	2
2013–14	HC Pardubice	Czech	48	7	14	21	36	10	1	4	5	12
2014–15	HC Pardubice	Czech	46	7	14	21	48	9	0	3	3	8
2015–16	HC Energie Karlovy Vary	Czech	40	3	5	8	18	—	—	—	—	—
2016–17	HC Energie Karlovy Vary	Czech	33	2	5	7	14	—	—	—	—	—
2017–18	HC Chotíkov	Czech4	3	0	3	3	—	—	—	—	—	—
2018–19	EV Pegnitz	Germany4	2	0	0	0	12	—	—	—	—	—
2018–19	ERSC Amberg	Germany5	17	9	16	25	0	—	—	—	—	—
2019–20	HC Tachov	Czech4	9	2	2	4	0	—	—	—	—	—
Czech totals			755	63	154	217	764	91	5	18	23	87
Czech2 totals			135	13	32	45	48	6	0	1	1	35
