= Porter Martone =

Canadian ice hockey player (born 2006)

- Born: October 26, 2006 (age 19) Peterborough, Ontario, Canada
- Height: 6 ft 3 in (191 cm)
- Weight: 214 lb (97 kg; 15 st 4 lb)
- Position: Right wing
- Shoots: Right
- NHL team: Philadelphia Flyers
- National team: Canada
- NHL draft: 6th overall, 2025; Philadelphia Flyers
- Playing career: 2026–present

Porter Joseph Martone (born October 26, 2006) is a Canadian professional ice hockey player who is a right winger for the Philadelphia Flyers of the National Hockey League (NHL). He was drafted sixth overall by the Flyers in the 2025 NHL entry draft.

== Playing career ==
Following the 2021–22 season, in which he scored 41 goals and 63 assists in 53 games for the Toronto Jr. Canadiens U16 AAA along with helping the team win the silver medal at the OHL Cup, Martone was selected fifth overall by the Sarnia Sting in the first round of the Ontario Hockey League's 2022 Priority Selection. Martone signed with the Sting on May 21, 2022, which included a no-trade clause.

Martone debuted with the Sting in the 2022–23 season, playing a supporting bottom-six forward role. He recorded six goals and seven assists in 29 games before being traded to the Mississauga Steelheads on January 7, 2023, along with Angus MacDonnell in exchange for Ethan Del Mastro and Luca Del Bel Belluz. Martone waived the no-trade clause in his contract with the Sting after being asked to. After being traded to the Steelheads and being placed on a higher line, his offensive production increased with 13 goals and nine assists in 32 games, for a total of 35 points in 61 games.

Martone continued his junior career with the Steelheads during the 2023–24 OHL season. His production increased again as he recorded 33 goals and 38 assists in 60 games, becoming one of the league's leading goal scorers. During the season, the media compared him to Matthew Knies and Corey Perry.

Following the 2023–24 OHL season, Martone was invited to Hockey Canada's Program of Excellence Summer Camps, which help decide rosters for Canada's four national ice hockey teams. After the summer camp, he participated in the Hockey Night in Brampton charity game, which included names such as Mitch Marner and Chris Pronger. On July 21, 2025, Martone left the OHL and committed to play NCAA Division I men's ice hockey with Michigan State for the 2025–26 season.

=== Philadelphia Flyers ===
On March 29, 2026, the Philadelphia Flyers signed Martone to a three-year, entry-level contract. He made his NHL debut on March 31, against the Washington Capitals. Martone scored his first goal on April 5, an overtime game winner against the Boston Bruins.

On April 18, 2026, Martone scored his first NHL playoff goal and playoff game-winning goal during game one of the Flyers' first round series against their rivals, the Pittsburgh Penguins. He scored again during game two of the series, becoming the first teenager in franchise history to score a goal in their first two games and the first in league history to score two game-winning goals in their first two playoff games.

== International play ==
Medal record

Men's ice hockey

Representing Canada

World Junior Championships
Bronze medal – third place	2026 United States	

World U18 Championship
Gold medal – first place	2024 Finland	
Bronze medal – third place	2023 Switzerland	

Hlinka Gretzky Cup
Gold medal – first place	2023 Slovakia/Czech Republic	

Martone debuted internationally with Canada Red at the 2022 World U-17 Hockey Challenge. He recorded seven goals and five assists, tying third in the tournament for most points, to help Canada Red win silver. Despite his efforts, he credited Berkly Catton and Michael Misa as the biggest helpers.

Following the U-17 Hockey Challenge, he was selected as one of the four 16-year-olds for the 2023 World U18 Championships. He recorded three goals and three assists and helped Canada win a bronze medal. Martone was also selected for the 2023 Hlinka Gretzky Cup, scoring seven goals and eight assists as Canada won a gold medal.

Martone was selected as the only returnee and the captain for Canada at the 2024 World U18 Championships. In Canada's third game in the group stage against the Czech Republic, Martone scored a hat-trick, helping secure an 8–1 victory. During the tournament, he broke an all-time Canadian points record with 22, surpassing Connor Bedard. He ended the tournament with five goals and 12 assists, and also won a gold medal. Following the tournament, Martone was named to tournament's media All-Star team.

Martone joined the Canada senior team at its pre-tournament camp for the 2025 World Championship. Though not named to the final roster, he remained with the team as they began the tournament. Ahead of Canada's final preliminary round game, Martone was added to the roster to replace injured forward Bo Horvat. He made his debut with senior team in Canada's final preliminary round game against Sweden.

In December 2025, he was selected to represent Canada junior team at the 2026 World Junior Championships. During the tournament he recorded seven goals and six assists in seven games and won a bronze medal.

Martone joined the Canadian senior team again for the 2026 IIHF World Championship where he scored five points in 10 games.

== Personal life ==
Martone is a second generation Italian immigrant, his grandfather Joe having emigrated from Italy to Canada with his family when he was nine years old. His father, Mike, played professional ice hockey, and was drafted 106th overall in the fourth round of the 1996 NHL entry draft by the Buffalo Sabres, but never played in the NHL. He has a younger sister, Audrey, who is committed to play NCAA Division I hockey at Colgate University.

== Career statistics ==
=== Regular season and playoffs ===
			Regular season					Playoffs
Season	Team	League	GP	G	A	Pts	PIM	GP	G	A	Pts	PIM
2022–23	Sarnia Sting	OHL	29	6	7	13	31	—	—	—	—	—
2022–23	Mississauga Steelheads	OHL	32	13	9	22	26	6	2	4	6	19
2023–24	Mississauga Steelheads	OHL	60	33	38	71	63	5	1	5	6	10
2024–25	Brampton Steelheads	OHL	57	37	61	98	74	6	4	5	9	10
2025–26	Michigan State University	B1G	35	25	25	50	78	—	—	—	—	—
2025–26	Philadelphia Flyers	NHL	9	4	6	10	6	10	2	3	5	6
NHL totals			9	4	6	10	6	10	2	3	5	6

=== International ===
Year	Team	Event	Result	GP	G	A	Pts	PIM
2022	Canada Red	U17	2nd place, silver medalist(s)	7	7	5	12	6
2023	Canada	U18	3rd place, bronze medalist(s)	7	3	3	6	27
2023	Canada	HG18	1st place, gold medalist(s)	5	2	3	5	6
2024	Canada	U18	1st place, gold medalist(s)	7	5	12	17	6
2025	Canada	WJC	5th	3	1	0	1	2
2025	Canada	WC	5th	2	0	0	0	0
2026	Canada	WJC	3rd place, bronze medalist(s)	7	6	3	9	6
2026	Canada	WC	4th	10	1	4	5	6
Junior totals				36	24	26	50	53
Senior totals				12	1	4	5	6

== Awards and honours ==
Award	Year	Ref
College
All-Big Ten First Team	2026	
All-Big Ten Freshman Team	2026	
AHCA West First Team All-American	2026	

Awards and achievements
Preceded by Jett Luchanko	Philadelphia Flyers' first-round draft pick 2025	Succeeded by Jack Nesbitt
