= Adam Benák =

Czech ice hockey player (born 2007)

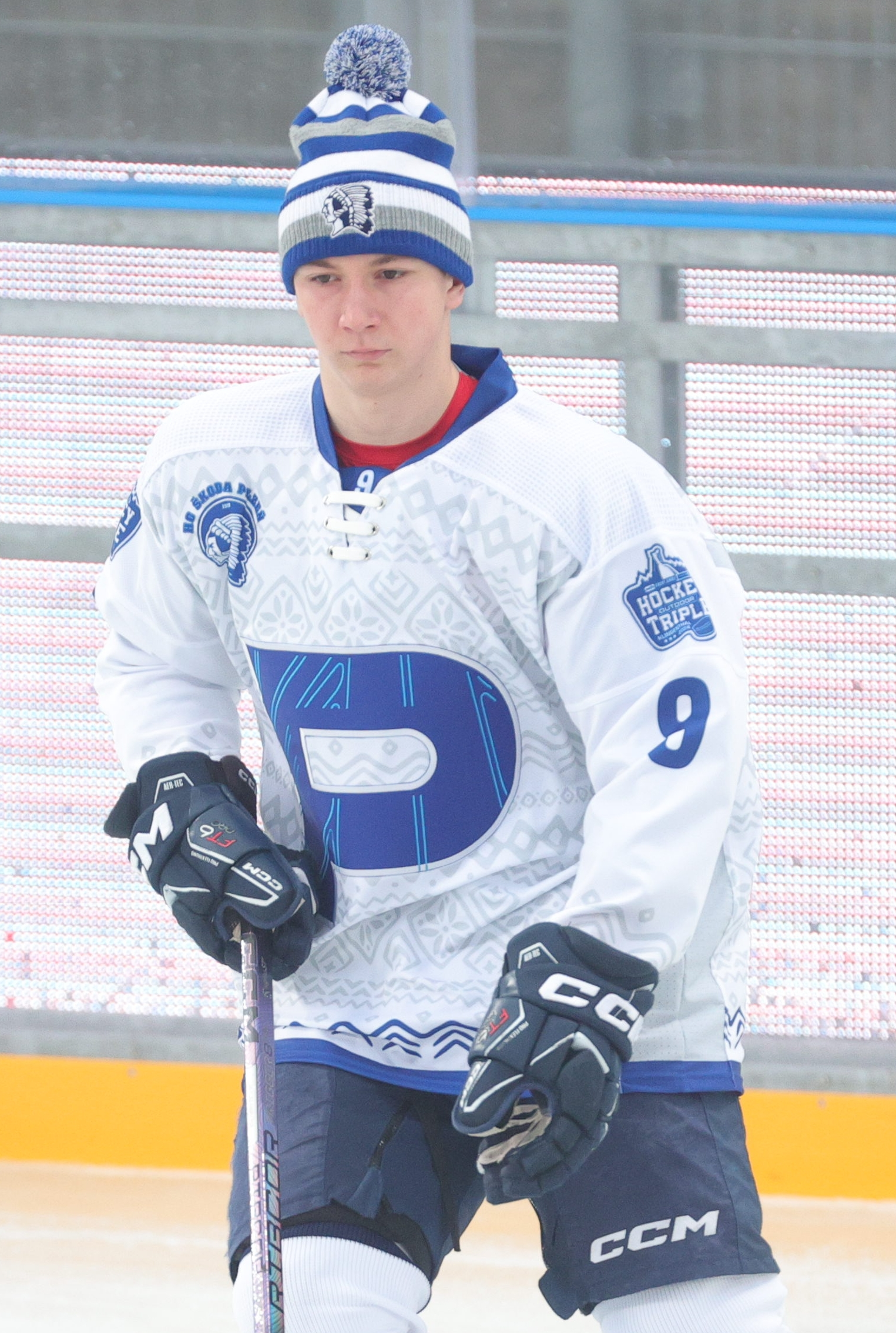
- Benák with HC Škoda Plzeň in 2024
- Born: 10 April 2007 (age 19) Plzeň, Czech Republic
- Height: 5 ft 7 in (170 cm)
- Weight: 164 lb (74 kg; 11 st 10 lb)
- Position: Centre
- Shoots: Left
- OHL team Former teams: Brantford Bulldogs; HC Škoda Plzeň
- NHL draft: 102nd overall, 2025; Minnesota Wild
- Playing career: 2023–present

Adam Benák (born 10 April 2007) is a Czech ice hockey player who is a centre for the Brantford Bulldogs of the Ontario Hockey League (OHL). He was drafted 102nd overall, in the fourth round of the 2025 NHL entry draft by the Minnesota Wild.

== Playing career ==
Benák entered the Czech under-17 league at 14 years old in the 2021–22 season, scoring 36 goals and 81 points in 48 games before notching a championship-clinching overtime goal in game six of the finals against HC Sparta Praha. The following season, he played 12 under-17 matched and averaged two points per game before earning promotion to the under-20 league. In his first match at the junior level, against BK Mladá Boleslav, he recorded two goals and an assist. After 31 games in his rookie junior season, he had amassed 10 goals and 31 points.

Benák made his professional debut at 16 years old in the 2023–24 season. He spent the preseason at the Czech Extraliga level before being sent back to juniors, where he recorded eight goals and 29 points in 29 games. By the end of the season, he had earned a full-time spot in the Extraliga.

After being drafted by the Youngstown Phantoms of the United States Hockey League (USHL) in the fourth round of the 2024 USHL phase II draft, Benák announced he would move to the United States and join the Phantoms for the 2024–25 season. In his debut with the Phantoms, a 4–3 overtime victory over the Tri-City Storm on 19 September 2024, he recorded two assists. He would go on to lead the Phantoms in scoring by a six-point margin with 59 points in 56 games, a mark that also led the league among under-18 players.

Prior to the 2024–25 season, Benák was projected to be a first-round pick in the 2025 NHL entry draft despite concerns about his diminutive height of 5 ft 7 in (1.70 m). He was ultimately taken 102nd overall, in the fourth round by the Minnesota Wild.

== International play ==
Medal record

Representing Czech Republic

Men's ice hockey

World Junior Championships
Silver medal – second place	2026 United States	

Hlinka Gretzky Cup
Silver medal – second place	2023 Slovakia/Czech Republic	
Silver medal – second place	2024 Canada	

Benák attended the 2022 World U-17 Hockey Challenge with the Czech under-17 team. In the final match before their elimination, a 7–5 loss to Canada Black, Benák scored a Michigan goal with less than three minutes left in the game. The Czechs went winless at the event, losing five games in regulation and earning their lone standings point from an overtime loss.

Representing the Czech Republic at the 2023 Hlinka Gretzky Cup as a 16-year-old, one year younger than most of the competition, Benák totaled two goals and ten points over five games, breaking the record for points by an underage player (three) and points by a Czech player (seven). The Czechs made it to the finals before dropping 3–2 in overtime to Canada.

Entering the 2024 World U18 Championship with high expectations, Benák did not live up to his hype. In five games before a quarterfinal elimination at the hands of Slovakia, he tallied one goal and three points.

The only returning Czech player the 2024 Hlinka Gretzky Cup, Benák claimed the tournament's career scoring record with a hat-trick plus two assists for a five-point performance against Germany in the second game of the event. He would finish his second Hlinka tournament second in scoring with four goals and 11 points, for a career total of six goals and 21 points. For the second straight year, the Czechs claimed silver with a loss to Canada in the finals.

Benák was among the captains of the Czech team at the 2025 World U18 Championship.

In December 2025, he was selected to represent Czechia at the 2026 World Junior Ice Hockey Championships. He recorded one goal and seven assists in seven games and won a silver medal.

== Personal life ==
Benák is the son of former Czech Extraliga defenceman Václav Benák. He first ice skated at two years old, and played youth hockey in Pardubice and Sokolov before moving to Plzeň in fifth grade.

== Career statistics ==
=== Regular season and playoffs ===
			Regular season					Playoffs
Season	Team	League	GP	G	A	Pts	PIM	GP	G	A	Pts	PIM
2022–23	HC Škoda Plzeň	CZE U20	30	10	21	31	8	1	0	0	0	0
2023–24	HC Škoda Plzeň	CZE U20	29	8	21	29	18	4	1	3	4	2
2023–24	HC Škoda Plzeň	ELH	18	0	2	2	18	—	—	—	—	—
2024–25	Youngstown Phantoms	USHL	56	17	42	59	36	3	0	3	3	2
2025–26	Brantford Bulldogs	OHL	48	28	49	77	29	15	3	8	11	2
Czech Extraliga totals			18	0	2	2	18	—	—	—	—	—

=== International ===
Year	Team	Event	Result	GP	G	A	Pts	PIM
2022	Czech Republic	U17	7th	6	3	3	6	0
2023	Czech Republic	HG18	2nd place, silver medalist(s)	5	2	8	10	4
2023	Czech Republic	U17	4th	8	3	5	8	0
2024	Czech Republic	U18	6th	5	1	2	3	0
2024	Czech Republic	HG18	2nd place, silver medalist(s)	5	4	7	11	4
2025	Czech Republic	U18	7th	4	2	5	7	4
2026	Czech Republic	WJC	2nd place, silver medalist(s)	7	1	7	8	2
Junior totals				40	16	37	53	14
