= Jett Luchanko =

Canadian ice hockey player (born 2006)

- Born: August 21, 2006 (age 20) London, Ontario, Canada
- Height: 5 ft 11 in (180 cm)
- Weight: 180 lb (82 kg; 12 st 12 lb)
- Position: Centre
- Shoots: Right
- NHL team (P) Cur. team: Philadelphia Flyers; Lehigh Valley Phantoms (AHL)
- NHL draft: 13th overall, 2024; Philadelphia Flyers
- Playing career: 2024–present

Jett Luchanko (born August 21, 2006) is a Canadian professional ice hockey centre for the Lehigh Valley Phantoms of the American Hockey League (AHL) while under contract with the Philadelphia Flyers of the National Hockey League (NHL). The Flyers selected Luchanko in the first round, 13th overall, of the 2024 NHL entry draft.

== Early life ==
Luchanko was born August 21, 2006, in London, Ontario. A childhood fan of the Toronto Maple Leafs of the National Hockey League, his favorite ice hockey player was Mitch Marner. Luchanko also idolized Nick Suzuki, who he watched play minor ice hockey. While quarantined at the height of the COVID-19 pandemic, Luchanko's father converted their basement into a personal gym, which improved Jett's strength and fitness while he could not play hockey. Luchanko spent the 2021–22 season with the London Jr. Knights of Alliance Hockey, during which he had 22 goals and 57 points in 27 regular season games, with another four goals and 16 points in eight postseason appearances. He also had a brief stint with the Strathroy Rockets of the Greater Ontario Junior Hockey League, with one goal and one assist in four games.

== Playing career ==
The Guelph Storm of the Ontario Hockey League (OHL) selected Luchanko 12th overall in the 2022 OHL Priority Selection, and he signed with the team that May. Luchanko scored his first junior ice hockey goal on October 1, during Guelph's 10–6 loss to the Saginaw Spirit. During the 2022–23 season he recorded five goals and nine assists in 46 games. During the 2023–24 season he led the Storm in scoring with 20 goals and 54 assists in 68 games. At the end of the season, Luchanko received the William Hanley Trophy as the OHL's most sportsmanlike player.

The Philadelphia Flyers selected Luchanko 13th overall in the 2024 NHL entry draft. The pick was announced by legendary ring announcer and Philadelphia native, Michael Buffer. He signed a three-year entry-level contract with the organization on July 6. After impressing head coach John Tortorella and general manager Daniel Brière in training camp, Luchanko was named to the Flyers' opening night roster for the 2024–25 NHL season. At 18 years and 51 days old when he debuted against the Vancouver Canucks on October 11, Luchanko became the youngest player to appear in a game in Flyers history. On October 26, the Flyers returned Luchanko to Guelph for the remainder of the 2024–25 OHL season. He appeared in four games for the Flyers before this return. On January 17, 2025, the Storm named Luchanko captain.

Luchanko was once again named to the Flyers' opening night roster for the 2025–26 season. He appeared in four of the first eight games that season, going pointless in that period. On October 27, the Flyers returned Luchanko to Guelph. By the time of his return, he had been replaced as Storm captain by Charlie Paquette. Luchanko was named co-captain alongside Paquette on October 30.

On November 25, 2025, Luchanko was traded to the Brantford Bulldogs in exchange for Layne Gallacher and four OHL draft picks.

== International play ==
Medal record

Representing Canada

Ice hockey

World Junior Championships
Bronze medal – third place	2026 United States	

World U18 Championships
Gold medal – first place	2024 Finland	

Luchanko made his first international competition appearance at the 2022 World U-17 Hockey Challenge, playing for Team Canada Red. He had one goal and one assist in seven tournament games, capturing a silver medal with Canada Red, who lost the championship game 11–3 to the United States. Luchanko then appeared with the Canada men's national under-18 ice hockey team at the 2024 IIHF World U18 Championships in Finland. He had two goals and seven points in seven games for the gold-medal team, including an assist in the championship game against Team USA.

Luchanko represented Canada at the 2026 World Junior Ice Hockey Championships where he recorded one assist in seven games and won a bronze medal.

== Career statistics ==
=== Regular season and playoffs ===
			Regular season					Playoffs
Season	Team	League	GP	G	A	Pts	PIM	GP	G	A	Pts	PIM
2021–22	Strathroy Rockets	GOJHL	4	1	1	2	0	—	—	—	—	—
2022–23	Guelph Storm	OHL	46	5	9	14	10	6	0	1	1	2
2023–24	Guelph Storm	OHL	68	20	54	74	36	4	0	3	3	6
2024–25	Philadelphia Flyers	NHL	4	0	0	0	2	—	—	—	—	—
2024–25	Guelph Storm	OHL	46	21	35	56	46	—	—	—	—	—
2024–25	Lehigh Valley Phantoms	AHL	9	0	3	3	8	7	0	6	6	12
2025–26	Philadelphia Flyers	NHL	4	0	0	0	2	1	0	0	0	0
2025–26	Guelph Storm	OHL	11	2	15	17	10	—	—	—	—	—
2025–26	Brantford Bulldogs	OHL	27	5	21	26	24	15	2	5	7	10
NHL totals			8	0	0	0	4	1	0	0	0	0

=== International ===
Year	Team	Event	Result	GP	G	A	Pts	PIM
2022	Canada Red	U17	2nd place, silver medalist(s)	7	1	1	2	2
2024	Canada	U18	1st place, gold medalist(s)	7	2	5	7	6
2025	Canada	WJC	5th	5	1	0	1	2
2026	Canada	WJC	3rd place, bronze medalist(s)	7	0	1	1	4
Junior totals				26	4	7	11	14

== Awards and honours ==
Award	Year	Ref.
OHL
William Hanley Trophy	2024	

Awards and achievements
Preceded by Oliver Bonk	Philadelphia Flyers' first-round draft pick 2024	Succeeded by Porter Martone
