= Emil Hemming =

Finnish ice hockey player (born 2006)

- Born: 27 June 2006 (age 20) Vaasa, Finland
- Height: 6 ft 2 in (188 cm)
- Weight: 211 lb (96 kg; 15 st 1 lb)
- Position: Right wing
- Shoots: Right
- NHL team (P) Cur. team Former teams: Dallas Stars; Texas Stars (AHL); TPS
- NHL draft: 29th overall, 2024; Dallas Stars
- Playing career: 2023–present

Emil Hemming (born 27 June 2006) is a Finnish professional ice hockey player who is a right winger for the Texas Stars of the American Hockey League (AHL) while under contract to the Dallas Stars of the National Hockey League (NHL). He was drafted 29th overall by the Stars in the 2024 NHL entry draft.

== Playing career ==
When he turned 15, his family chose Petteri Lehto as his agent.

Starting the 2023–24 season in juniors and recording 11 goals and 18 points in just 13 games, Hemming was quickly promoted to the Liiga, scoring a goal in his debut against Oulun Kärpät on 20 September 2023. Playing in a fourth line checking role, he finished the year with seven goals and 11 points in 40 games.

Following his selection in the 2024 NHL entry draft by the Dallas Stars, Hemming was later signed to a three-year, entry-level contract with the club on 16 July 2024.

In late July 2024, Hemming signed with the Barrie Colts of the Ontario Hockey League (OHL) for the 2024–25 season.

== International play ==
Medal record

Men's Ice hockey

Representing Finland

World Junior Championships
Silver medal – second place	2025 Canada	

Representing Finland at the 2024 World Junior Championships, Hemming had two assists and averaged 8:45 through seven games. Finland would finish in fourth place.

== Career statistics ==
=== Regular season and playoffs ===
			Regular season					Playoffs
Season	Team	League	GP	G	A	Pts	PIM	GP	G	A	Pts	PIM
2021–22	Kiekko-Espoo	U20	2	0	1	1	0	—	—	—	—	—
2022–23	TPS	U20	22	7	9	16	4	8	1	0	1	14
2023–24	TPS	U20	13	11	7	18	2	11	5	5	10	4
2023–24	TPS	Liiga	40	7	4	11	0	—	—	—	—	—
2024–25	Barrie Colts	OHL	60	18	30	48	20	16	8	7	15	4
2025–26	Texas Stars	AHL	5	0	0	0	0	—	—	—	—	—
2025–26	Barrie Colts	OHL	46	26	37	63	22	21	15	13	28	6
Liiga totals			40	7	4	11	0	—	—	—	—	—

=== International ===
Year	Team	Event	Result	GP	G	A	Pts	PIM
2022	Finland	U17	3rd place, bronze medalist(s)	5	3	2	5	2
2023	Finland	HG18	4th	5	4	5	9	8
2024	Finland	WJC	4th	7	0	2	2	4
2024	Finland	U18	5th	7	0	2	2	4
2025	Finland	WJC	2nd place, silver medalist(s)	7	1	3	4	4
Junior totals				31	8	14	22	22

Awards and achievements
Preceded by Lian Bichsel	Dallas Stars first-round draft pick 2024	Succeeded by Incumbent
