= Trevor Connelly =

American ice hockey player (born 2006)

- Born: February 28, 2006 (age 20) Tustin, California, United States
- Height: 6 ft 1 in (185 cm)
- Weight: 161 lb (73 kg; 11 st 7 lb)
- Position: Left wing
- Shoots: Left
- NHL team: Vegas Golden Knights
- NHL draft: 19th overall, 2024; Vegas Golden Knights
- Playing career: 2025–present

Trevor Connelly (born February 28, 2006) is an American professional ice hockey player who is a left wing for the Vegas Golden Knights of the National Hockey League (NHL). He was drafted 19th overall by the Golden Knights in the 2024 NHL entry draft.

== Playing career ==
Between 2020 and 2022, Connelly played for four different amateur teams, unusual for a player of his calibre. One of the four, Bishop Kearney High School, suspended him almost immediately before he left within two weeks.

On March 14, 2022, Connelly signed with the Tri-City Storm of the United States Hockey League (USHL). At the 2022 USHL Fall Classic, he made his debut with the team in a 4–1 win over the Madison Capitols, and scored his first goal during a 6–4 victory over the Muskegon Lumberjacks. During the season, he recorded an 18-game points streak, the longest in Storm history. He also became one of two Storm players ever to record goals in seven straight games. In total in his rookie season, he scored 24 goals and 47 points, earning second-team all-rookie honors.

In the 2023–24 season, Connelly recorded 31 goals and 78 points in 52 games, good for seventh in goals and second in points in the USHL. The only player in the league to record at least 1.5 points per game and leading the Storm in goals, assists, points, and shots, he was named a second team USHL all-star. Ending his two-year career in the league, his 125 points were the second most in franchise history and his 60 goals were the third most. Entering the 2024 NHL entry draft, he was widely recognized for his skill, particularly his speed, vision, and intelligence, but some scouts were put off by multiple controversial incidents throughout his youth and junior career. In discussions with NHL personnel, Connelly cited his volunteer work and having participated in diversity training, concluding: "I just want to kind of not hang myself on the past and keep moving forward. And that's all I can do just to be the best person I can be every day." He was ultimately taken 19th overall by the Vegas Golden Knights.

On April 1, 2025, Connelly signed a three-year, entry-level contract with the Golden Knights.

Entering his second full professional season, Connelly made the Golden Knights' roster out of training camp. He subsequently made his debut in Vegas' first game of the 2026–27 season, scoring his first NHL goal in the first period of a 5–2 Vegas victory over the Chicago Blackhawks.

== International play ==
Medal record

Men's ice hockey

Representing United States

World Junior Championships
Gold medal – first place	2025 Canada	

World U18 Championship
Silver medal – second place	2024 Finland	

Hlinka Gretzky Cup
Bronze medal – third place	2023 Czechia/Slovakia	

In five games at the 2023 Hlinka Gretzky Cup, Connelly recorded five goals and ten points to lead Team USA to a third-place finish. Three of his five goals came in the form of a hat-trick during a lopsided 8–1 win over Germany in the preliminary round. Tied with Berkly Catton for the tournament's leading scorer, he was widely considered one of the best players at the event.

At the 2023 World Junior A Challenge, Connelly scored four goals, including a Michigan goal, in an 8–5 bronze medal victory over Sweden. Including the four-goal outing, he finished the event with eleven points.

Connelly rejoined Team USA again for the 2024 IIHF World U18 Championships, where he was the only member of the team not to be part of the National Team Development Program. He distinguished himself in their 7–1 victory over Latvia, where he had four points, including another Michigan goal. Team USA reached the championship final against Canada, and led 3–2 midway through the third period when Connelly received a five-minute major and a game misconduct for an illegal check to the head of Canadian forward Ryder Ritchie. The Canadians scored three goals on the ensuing power play, taking the lead, and would ultimately win the game 6–4 and take the gold medal. The Hockey News assessed that Connelly had been "effective throughout the tournament, but one bad moment might have cast a shadow over a very solid effort," as the five-minute major had caused the game to be "flipped on its head."

== Personal life ==
Connelly was born in Tustin, California, and spent the first eight years of his life in Modesto, California.

Initially a roller hockey player, Connelly switched to ice hockey when he was eight. He has a younger brother, C.J., who is also a hockey player.

Connelly experienced harassment and bullying from both parents and other children from a young age. When he was 14, he was suspended from Bishop Kearney High School following an incident where he allegedly responded to hazing and humiliation at the hands of his teammates by urinating on another player's equipment.

In 2022, while playing for the Long Island Gulls, 16-year-old Connelly posted a picture to Snapchat of him and a teammate posing in what appears to be a library with a swastika built out of children's blocks, captioned "creations." He quickly removed the post and apologized, stating that he did not understand the extent to which his actions would be hurtful, but was removed from the team. He has since participated in diversity training and community service, and received mentoring from a rabbi.

On another occasion, Connelly was accused of and suspended for using racial slurs during a match, an allegation he denied. The suspension was overturned when the league could not find any evidence that the incident occurred.

== Career statistics ==
=== Regular season and playoffs ===
			Regular season					Playoffs
Season	Team	League	GP	G	A	Pts	PIM	GP	G	A	Pts	PIM
2022–23	Tri-City Storm	USHL	57	24	23	47	54	3	2	2	4	0
2023–24	Tri-City Storm	USHL	52	31	47	78	88	—	—	—	—	—
2024–25	Providence College	HE	23	4	9	13	29	—	—	—	—	—
2024–25	Henderson Silver Knights	AHL	6	1	3	4	6	—	—	—	—	—
2025–26	Henderson Silver Knights	AHL	46	14	35	49	18	6	1	5	6	6
AHL totals			52	15	38	53	24	6	1	5	6	6

=== International ===
Year	Team	Event	Result	GP	G	A	Pts	PIM
2023	United States	HG18	3rd place, bronze medalist(s)	3	5	5	10	0
2023	United States	WJAC	3rd place, bronze medalist(s)	6	6	5	11	6
2024	United States	U18	2nd place, silver medalist(s)	7	4	5	9	31
2025	United States	WJC	1st place, gold medalist(s)	7	1	3	4	0
Junior totals				23	16	18	34	37

== Awards and honors ==
Award	Year	Ref
USHL
Second Team All-Rookie	2023	
Second Team All-Star	2024	
International
World Junior A Challenge – All-Star Team	2023	

Awards and achievements
Preceded by David Edstrom	Vegas Golden Knights first-round draft pick 2024	Succeeded by Juho Piiparinen
