= List of Utah Mammoth draft picks =

The Utah Mammoth are a professional ice hockey team in the National Hockey League based in Salt Lake City. They are a member of the Central Division in the Western Conference and began play during the league's 2024–25 season.

The NHL entry draft is held each off-season, allowing teams to select players who have turned 18 years old by September 15 in the year the draft is held. The draft order is determined by the previous season's order of finish, with non-playoff teams drafting first, followed by the teams that made the playoffs, with the specific order determined by the number of points earned by each team. The NHL holds a weighted lottery for the 16 non-playoff teams, allowing the winner to move up to the first overall pick. The team with the fewest points has the best chance of winning the lottery, with each successive team given a lower chance of moving up in the draft.

Utah first participated in the 2024 NHL entry draft at the Sphere in Paradise, Nevada, under the Utah Hockey Club name. Their first selection in franchise history was at sixth overall when they took Tij Iginla. Later in the first round, the Mammoth traded up with the Colorado Avalanche to take Cole Beaudoin at pick No. 24.

== Key ==
Key of colors and symbols
*	Played at least one game with Utah.
†	Spent entire NHL career with Utah.

General terms and abbreviations
Term or abbreviation	Definition
Draft	The year that the player was selected
Round	The round of the draft in which the player was selected
Pick	The overall position in the draft at which the player was selected

Position abbreviations
Abbreviation	Definition
G	Goaltender
D	Defense
LW	Left wing
C	Center
RW	Right wing
F	Forward

Abbreviations for statistical columns
Abbreviation	Definition
Pos	Position
GP	Games played
G	Goals
A	Assists
Pts	Points
PIM	Penalties in minutes
W	Wins
L	Losses
OT	Overtime/shootout losses
GAA	Goals against average
—	Does not apply

== Draft picks ==
Statistics are complete as of the 2025–26 NHL season and show each player's career regular season totals in the NHL. Wins, losses, overtime losses and goals against average apply to goaltenders and are used only for players at that position. This list does not include players drafted by the Winnipeg Jets or the Arizona Coyotes.

Full list of Utah Hockey Club draft picks
Draft	Round	Pick	Player	Nationality	Pos	GP	G	A	Pts	PIM	W	L	OT	GAA
2024	1	6	Tij Iginla	Canada	C	—	—	—	—	—	—	—	—	—
2024	1	24	Cole Beaudoin	Canada	C	—	—	—	—	—	—	—	—	—
2024	2	65	Will Skahan	United States	D	—	—	—	—	—	—	—	—	—
2024	3	89	Tomas Lavoie	Canada	D	—	—	—	—	—	—	—	—	—
2024	3	96	Veeti Väisänen	Finland	D	—	—	—	—	—	—	—	—	—
2024	4	98	Gregor Biber	Austria	D	—	—	—	—	—	—	—	—	—
2024	4	103	Gabe Smith	Canada	C	—	—	—	—	—	—	—	—	—
2024	5	135	Owen Allard	Canada	C	—	—	—	—	—	—	—	—	—
2024	5	153	Aleš Čech	Czech Republic	D	—	—	—	—	—	—	—	—	—
2024	6	167	Vojtěch Hradec	Czech Republic	C	—	—	—	—	—	—	—	—	—
2024	6	190	Ludvig Lafton	Norway	D	—	—	—	—	—	—	—	—	—
2025	1	4	Caleb Desnoyers	Canada	C	—	—	—	—	—	—	—	—	—
2025	2	46	Max Pšenička	Czech Republic	D	—	—	—	—	—	—	—	—	—
2025	3	78	Štěpán Hoch	Czech Republic	LW	—	—	—	—	—	—	—	—	—
2025	4	110	Yegor Borikov	Belarus	RW	—	—	—	—	—	—	—	—	—
2025	5	142	Ivan Tkach-Tkachenko	Russia	G	—	—	—	—	—	—	—	—	—
2025	6	174	Ludvig Johnson	Switzerland	D	—	—	—	—	—	—	—	—	—
2025	6	182	Reko Alanko	Finland	D	—	—	—	—	—	—	—	—	—
2026	1	17	Ethan Belchetz	Canada	LW	—	—	—	—	—	—	—	—	—
2026	3	96	Adam Valentini	Canada	C	—	—	—	—	—	—	—	—	—
2026	4	115	Carl Axelsson	Sweden	G	—	—	—	—	—	—	—	—	—
2026	5	130	Theodor Knights	Sweden	D	—	—	—	—	—	—	—	—	—
2026	5	147	Florent Houle	Canada	RW	—	—	—	—	—	—	—	—	—
2026	7	211	Artem Prima	Russia	RW	—	—	—	—	—	—	—	—	—

== See also ==
- List of Arizona Coyotes draft picks
