= James Hagens =

American ice hockey player (born 2006)

- Hagens warming up prior to his NHL debut in 2026
- Born: November 3, 2006 (age 19) Hauppauge, New York, U.S.
- Height: 5 ft 11 in (180 cm)
- Weight: 186 lb (84 kg; 13 st 4 lb)
- Position: Center
- Shoots: Left
- NHL team: Boston Bruins
- National team: United States
- NHL draft: 7th overall, 2025; Boston Bruins
- Playing career: 2026–present

James Hagens (born November 3, 2006) is an American professional ice hockey player who is a center for the Boston Bruins of the National Hockey League (NHL). He was selected seventh overall by the Bruins in the 2025 NHL entry draft. Before going pro, he played for Boston College of the National Collegiate Athletic Association (NCAA).

== Early life ==
Hagens was born in Hauppauge, New York and grew up a fan of local Long Island team the New York Islanders.

== Playing career ==
=== Amateur ===
Hagens played for the USA Hockey National Team Development Program (NTDP) during the 2022–23 season, where he ranked second on the team in scoring with 26 goals and 40 assists in 43 games with the under-17 team. He also recorded seven goals and 12 assists in 17 games with the under-18 team. He competed at the 2024 BioSteel All-American Game where he recorded a goal and an assist and was subsequently named the game's most valuable player (MVP). During the 2023–24 season, he recorded 18 goals and 29 assists in 26 games for the NTDP in the United States Hockey League (USHL).

=== Collegiate ===
Hagens committed to play college ice hockey for Boston College during the 2024–25 season.

Heading into the season, Hagens was seen as the project first overall pick in the 2025 NHL entry draft. Hagens started the season on fire, registering a seven-game point streak to open the season, in which he scored a goal and ten assists for 11 points. Hagens was named Hockey East Rookie of the Month for November after scoring two goals and eight assists in the month. Mid-season, Hagens also played for the United States in the 2025 World Junior Ice Hockey Championships, where he led the U.S. to a gold medal. Hagens' production would help lead Boston College to a #1 ranking in the nation, as well as the #1 seed in the Hockey East tournament. After earning a bye, the Eagles were upset by the Northeastern Huskies in the first game 3-1, where Hagens would score the only goal. Fortunately, the Eagles had built a good enough reputation to earn an at-large bid in the NCAA tournament, where they were set to face Bentley in the first round, as the #1 seed in their pool. Hagens would again score against Bentley, helping the Eagles to a 3-1 win to advance to the second round against defending champion Denver. Unfortunately, the Eagles would be knocked out, losing 3-1 again, while Hagens went scoreless in the game. In total, Hagens finished his freshman season with 11 goals and 26 assists for 37 points, good for third on the team in points, and second in assists.

After the season, Hagens was set to be drafted. Although he was still expected to be a top-10 pick, he had dropped in the rankings not due to his own production, but due to the emergence of other prospects over the past season. Hagens dropped to seventh overall, being picked by the Boston Bruins, with Adam Sandler announcing the pick in his Happy Gilmore character. It was later revealed that during the draft, Hagens hometown team, the New York Islanders, who had drafted Matthew Schaefer with the first overall pick, had tried to facilitate a blockbuster where they would've traded for the Bruins' pick and taken Hagens, but the Bruins stayed pat. Although there was some speculation that Hagens would make the immediate jump to the pro level, later that summer he made the decision to return to Boston College for another season.

Hagens returned to Boston College with high expectations, hoping to build off his offensive production the previous year, as well as produce more goals. Again, Hagens started the season on a roll, with a six-game point streak that included three goals and four assists for seven points. In late November, Hagens produced his first collegiate hat-trick against Notre Dame, indicative of his goal scoring ability. He would score another hat-trick against UConn Huskies in January. Hagens also led Boston College to a Beanpot victory and won tournament MVP for his efforts, scoring 2 goals and 3 assists in the tournament. Unfortunately, despite Hagens' growth in the goal scoring department, the team success wasn't as great as last year. Boston College teetered around 11th overall in the rankings, but a four-game losing streak to close out the regular season proved detrimental to their tournament chances, as it was all but a given that they wouldn't make the NCAA tournament without an automatic bid by winning the Hockey East. They went into the Hockey East tournament as the #4 seed, and got off to a good start, routing Maine 5-0, with Hagens scored two goals and an assist in the victory. The Eagles chances came to an end the next game against UConn, where they would lose 4-3 in an overtime heartbreaker, and Hagens gaining two assists. The loss would put an end to Boston College's season, as they would fail to reach the NCAA Tournament. Hagens would finish the season leading the Eagles in goals, assists, and points, with 23, 24, and 47, respectively. He was also the Hockey East Scoring Champion, and named one of Hockey East Three-Stars, as well as to the Hockey East First All-Star Team. He was also named a top 10 finalist for the Hobey Baker Award.

=== Professional ===
On March 24, 2026, Hagens officially turned pro, as the Boston Bruins announced they had signed Hagens to an AHL amateur try-out agreement, and he would report the Bruins American Hockey League (AHL) affiliate, the Providence Bruins. Two weeks later, after scoring four points in six games with Providence, Hagens signed a three-year entry-level contract worth $975,000 per year with the Boston. Hagens opted to wear #44, as his traditional #4 that he wore in his amateur career is retired by the Bruins for Bobby Orr.

Hagens made his NHL debut on April 12, 2026, against the Columbus Blue Jackets. He earned the first NHL point of his career with an assist on a goal by Henri Jokiharju in the same game. The Bruins would make the playoffs and face the Buffalo Sabres in the first round, and Hagens made his playoff debut in Game 1 of the series. However, after going scoreless in the first three games of the series, and the Bruins needing an offensive spark, Hagens was scratched starting in Game 4, and would not make an appearance for the rest of the series, where the Bruins were eliminated by the Sabres in six games, ending his season.

== International play ==
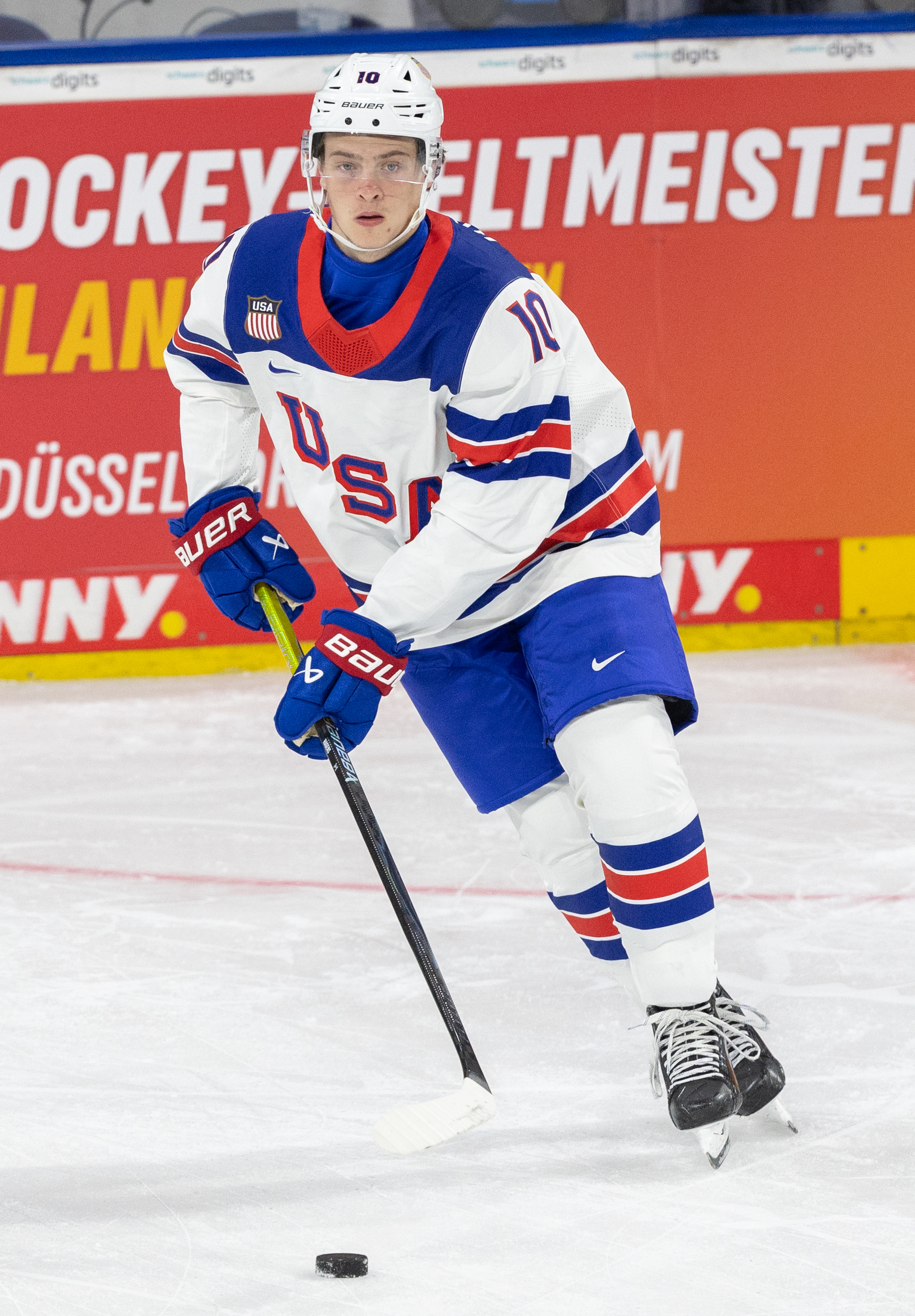
- Hagens with the United States men's national ice hockey team at the 2026 IIHF World Championship

Medal record

Representing United States

Ice hockey

World Junior Championships
Gold medal – first place	2025 Canada	

World U18 Championships
Gold medal – first place	2023 Switzerland	
Silver medal – second place	2024 Finland	

World U-17 Hockey Challenge
Gold medal – first place	2022 Canada	

Hagens represented the United States at the 2022 World U-17 Hockey Challenge where he recorded eight goals and 13 assists in seven games and won a gold medal. His 21 points set a World U-17 Hockey Challenge record, surpassing the previous record of 18 points set by Colin White in 2014.

He represented the United States at the 2023 IIHF World U18 Championships, where he recorded one goal and four assists in seven games and won a gold medal.

He was named to USA Hockey's selection camp roster for the 2024 World Junior Ice Hockey Championships, where he was the youngest of 29 players invited, and was one of the last players cut from the roster.

He again represented the United States at the 2024 IIHF World U18 Championships, where he led the tournament in scoring with nine goals and 13 assists in seven games and won a silver medal. He was subsequently named tournament MVP, and was also named to the media all-star team and was named best forward by the IIHF Directorate. His 22 points set a IIHF World U18 Championship record, surpassing the previous record of 21 points set by Nikita Kucherov in 2011.

On December 18, 2024, he was named to the United States men's national junior ice hockey team to compete at the 2025 World Junior Ice Hockey Championships. During the tournament he recorded five goals and four assists in seven games and won a gold medal. On December 24 2025, he was again named to the United States men's national junior ice hockey team to compete at the 2026 World Junior Ice Hockey Championships. During the tournament he ranked second on the team in scoring with two goals and five assists in five games, and was eliminated in the quarterfinals by Finland.

After Hagens and the Bruins were eliminated in the 2026 Stanley Cup playoffs, it was announced the Hagens would join the United States at the 2026 IIHF World Championship, his first appearance with the senior team.

== Personal life ==
Hagens' brother, Michael, is also an ice hockey player who currently plays at University of Vermont.

== Career statistics ==
=== Regular season and playoffs ===
			Regular season					Playoffs
Season	Team	League	GP	G	A	Pts	PIM	GP	G	A	Pts	PIM
2022–23	U.S. National Development Team	USHL	31	17	23	40	24	—	—	—	—	—
2023–24	U.S. National Development Team	USHL	26	18	29	47	20	—	—	—	—	—
2024–25	Boston College	HE	37	11	26	37	24	—	—	—	—	—
2025–26	Boston College	HE	34	23	24	47	24	—	—	—	—	—
2025–26	Providence Bruins	AHL	6	1	3	4	2	—	—	—	—	—
2025–26	Boston Bruins	NHL	2	0	1	1	2	3	0	0	0	2
NHL totals			2	0	1	1	2	3	0	0	0	2

=== International ===
Bold indicates led tournament

Year	Team	Event	Result	GP	G	A	Pts	PIM
2022	United States	U17	1st place, gold medalist(s)	7	8	**13**	**21**	8
2023	United States	U18	1st place, gold medalist(s)	7	1	4	5	0
2024	United States	U18	2nd place, silver medalist(s)	7	9	**13**	**22**	4
2025	United States	WJC	1st place, gold medalist(s)	7	5	4	9	2
2026	United States	WJC	5th	5	2	5	7	0
2026	United States	WC	8th	7	0	1	1	2
Junior totals				33	25	39	64	14
Senior totals				7	0	1	1	2

== Awards, honors and records ==
Award	Year	Ref
College
Hockey East All-Rookie Team	2025	
Beanpot Most Valuable Player	2026	
Hockey East Scoring Champion	2026	
Hockey East Three-Stars Award	2026	
Hockey East First All-Star Team	2026	
AHCA East First-Team All-American	2026	
International
World U-17 Hockey Challenge All-Star Team	2022	
USA Hockey All-American Game Most Valuable Player	2024	
IIHF World U18 Championship Best Forward	2024	
IIHF World U18 Championship Most Valuable Player	2024	
IIHF World U18 Championship All-Star Team	2024	
IIHF World U18 Championship Top 3 Player on Team	2024	
IIHF World Junior Championship Top 3 Player on Team	2026	

=== Records ===
- Most assists and points in one World U-17 Hockey Challenge tournament.
- World U-17 Hockey Challenge all-time most assists and points.
- Most points in one IIHF World U18 Championship tournament.

Awards and achievements
Preceded by Dean Letourneau	Boston Bruins first-round draft pick 2025	Succeeded by Incumbent
