= Petteri Rimpinen =

Finnish ice hockey player (born 2006)

- Born: 25 April 2006 (age 20) Kirkkonummi, Finland
- Height: 182 cm (6 ft 0 in)
- Weight: 80 kg (176 lb; 12 st 8 lb)
- Position: Goaltender
- Catches: Left
- Liiga team: Kiekko-Espoo
- NHL draft: 152nd overall, 2025; Los Angeles Kings
- Playing career: 2024–present

Petteri Johannes Rimpinen (born 25 April 2006) is a Finnish professional ice hockey goaltender currently playing for Kiekko-Espoo in the Liiga. Nicknamed "Showtime", Rimpinen was drafted 152nd overall by the Los Angeles Kings in the 2025 NHL entry draft.

== Playing career ==
Rimpinen is a product of HCK Salamat in Kirkkonummi. As a junior, he moved to the Espoo Blues organization. During the 2021–22 season, he played primarily for the Kiekko-Espoo U20 team but also helped the U18 team win the Finnish Championship.

For the 2022–23 season, Rimpinen moved to the TPS U20 team. He served primarily as the backup to Noa Vali, appearing in 16 regular-season games. Rimpinen's save percentage of .931 and goals-against average of 1.75 were the best in the U20 SM-sarja. He won a U20 bronze medal at the end of the season.

In June 2023, Rimpinen returned to Kiekko-Espoo on a Mestis contract. During the 2023–24 season, he rose through the depth chart to become the team's starting goaltender during the playoffs, eventually leading the team to a Mestis bronze medal. His .926 save percentage and 1.82 GAA were the best in the league that season.

Following Kiekko-Espoo's promotion to the Liiga for the 2024–25 season, Rimpinen made his top-flight debut on 10 September 2024 against HIFK. He recorded his first Liiga shutout on 1 October 2024 against SaiPa. He finished his rookie season with 40 games played and 16 wins. He made his playoff debut on 18 March 2025, recording a 31-save shutout against Tappara. At the conclusion of the season, Rimpinen was awarded the Jarmo Wasama memorial trophy as the Liiga Rookie of the Year, becoming the first goaltender to win the award since Juuse Saros in 2014. He was also a finalist for the Urpo Ylönen trophy as the league's best goaltender.

In November 2025, Rimpinen signed a one-year contract extension with Kiekko-Espoo.

== International play ==
Petteri Rimpinen
Medal record

Representing Finland

Men's ice hockey

World Junior Championships
Silver medal – second place	2025 Canada	Team

Hlinka Gretzky Cup
Bronze medal – third place	2022 Red Deer	Team

Rimpinen represented Finland at the 2024 IIHF World U18 Championships. He also played in the 2025 World Junior Ice Hockey Championships, where he won a silver medal. Rimpinen played all seven games for Finland and was named the tournament's Best Goaltender and a member of the All-Star Team. Rimpinen is currently playing at the 2026 World Junior Ice Hockey Championships, as Team Finland's starting goaltender.

== Personal life ==
Rimpinen is a student of business administration. He has cited Tuukka Rask as his role model. Rimpinen is related to the family of former Canadian goaltender Dave Stathos, who played 110 Liiga games for HIFK and Pelicans.

== Career statistics ==
=== Regular season and playoffs ===
			Regular season									Playoffs							
Season	Team	League	GP	W	L	T	MIN	GA	SO	GAA	SV%	GP	W	L	MIN	GA	SO	GAA	SV%
2021–22	Kiekko-Espoo	U20-SM	17	7	8	0	988	43	1	2.61	.917	—	—	—	—	—	—	—	—
2022–23	TPS	U20-SM	16	10	3	0	958	28	2	1.75	.931	—	—	—	—	—	—	—	—
2023–24	Kiekko-Espoo	U20-SM	18	10	7	0	1084	42	2	2.32	.905	—	—	—	—	—	—	—	—
2023–24	Kiekko-Espoo	Mestis	14	6	4	3	804	26	2	1.94	.925	11	5	5	595	18	1	1.82	.926
2024–25	Kiekko-Espoo	Liiga	40	16	9	14	2420	95	2	2.35	.912	5	2	3	287	13	1	2.71	.920

=== International ===
Year	Team	Event	GP	W	L	MIN	GA	SO	GAA	SV%
2024	Finland	U18	4	2	2	221	11	0	2.99	.876
2025	Finland	WJC	7	5	2	437	17	0	2.34	.933
