= 2023 IIHF World U18 Championships =

Under-18 men's ice hockey tournament

2023 IIHF U18 World Championship

Tournament details
- Host country: Switzerland
- Venues: 2 (in 2 host cities)
- Dates: 20–30 April
- Teams: 10

Final positions
- Champions: United States (11th title)
- Runners-up: Sweden
- Third place: Canada
- Fourth place: Slovakia

Tournament statistics
- Games played: 30
- Goals scored: 218 (7.27 per game)
- Attendance: 47,087 (1,570 per game)
- Scoring leader: (United States) Will Smith (20 points)

Awards
- MVP: (United States) Will Smith

Official website
- IIHF.com

The 2023 IIHF U18 World Championship was the 24th such event hosted by the International Ice Hockey Federation. Teams participated at several levels of competition. The competition also served as qualifications for the 2024 competition.

== Top Division ==
The tournament was held in Basel and Porrentruy, Switzerland, from 20 to 30 April 2023.

=== Preliminary round ===
==== Group A ====
The Group A matches were played in Porrentruy, Switzerland, from 20 to 25 April 2023.

Pos	Team	Pld	W	OTW	OTL	L	GF	GA	GD	Pts	Qualification
1	Sweden	4	4	0	0	0	18	3	+15	12	Advance to Quarterfinals
2	Canada	4	3	0	0	1	20	14	+6	9	Advance to Quarterfinals
3	Slovakia	4	1	1	0	2	15	15	0	5	Advance to Quarterfinals
4	Czechia	4	1	0	1	2	12	14	−2	4	Advance to Quarterfinals
5	Germany	4	0	0	0	4	5	24	−19	0	Advance to Relegation round

Source: IIHF

20 April 2023; 14:30	Canada	0–8 (0–5, 0–1, 0–2)	Sweden	Raiffeisen Arena, Porrentruy; Attendance: 1,998

Game reference

Carson Bjarnason
Gabriel D'Aigle
Goalies
Noah Erliden
Referees:
(Czech Republic) Adam Kika
(Germany) Lukas Kohlmüller
Linesmen:
(Czech Republic) Lukáš Rampír
(Switzerland) Dominik Schlegel

0–1	03:33 – Stenberg (Willander, Unger Sörum)
0–2	04:53 – Nordh (Sandin Pellikka)
0–3	10:43 – Dower Nilsson (Sandin Pellikka, Forsfjäll)
0–4	12:51 – Sandin Pellikka (Stenberg, Edstrom)
0–5	13:28 – Wahlberg (Forsfjäll) (EA)
0–6	25:32 – Forsfjäll (Lindstein, Sandin Pellikka) (PP)
0–7	41:44 – Stenberg (Wahlberg, Sandin Pellikka) (PP2)
0–8	56:08 – Unger Sörum (Stenberg, Wahlberg)

60 min
Penalties
6 min
30
Shots
24

20 April 2023; 18:30	Czechia	2–3 GWS (0–1, 2–1, 0–0); OT: (0–0); SO: (0–1)	Slovakia	Raiffeisen Arena, Porrentruy; Attendance: 1,193

Game reference

Michael Hrabal
Goalies
Samuel Urban
Referees:
(Switzerland) Micha Hebeisen
(Switzerland) Loic Ruprecht
Linesmen:
(United States) Shane Gustafson
(Austria) Simon Riecken

	0–1	10:24 – Cedzo (Štrbák, Jenčko) (PP)
	0–2	23:35 – Cedzo (Kukumberg, Pišoja) (PP)
Csabi (Jecho, Vochvest) – 37:38	1–2
Šalé (Šimek) – 39:26	2–2

Csabi
Petr (miss)
Šalé
Holinka (miss)
Štancl (miss)
Shootout
(miss) Masnica
Cedzo
(miss) Dvorský
Ridzoň
Jenčko
37 min
Penalties
2 min
23
Shots
42

21 April 2023; 14:30	Canada	8–0 (2–0, 3–0, 3–0)	Germany	Raiffeisen Arena, Porrentruy; Attendance: 968

Game reference

Carson Bjarnason
Goalies
Leon Willerscheid
Referees:
(Slovakia) Martin Jobbágy
(Austria) Christian Ofner
Linesmen:
(Denmark) Emil Dalsgaard
(Finland) Niko Jusi

Lardis (Martone, Ritchie) (PP) – 15:06	1–0
Wood (Cristall, Celebrini) (PP) – 16:45	2–0
Dragicevic (Bjarnason) (PP) – 30:39	3–0
Martone (MacDonell, Halaburda) – 31:59	4–0
Wood (Celebrini, Ritchie) – 35:00	5–0
Ritchie (Celebrini, Allen) – 46:30	6–0
Lardis (Catton, Martone) – 55:05	7–0
Lardis (Allen, Ritchie) (PP) – 58:55	8–0

6 min
Penalties
39 min
50
Shots
11

21 April 2023; 18:30	Slovakia	3–5 (1–3, 0–0, 2–2)	Sweden	Raiffeisen Arena, Porrentruy; Attendance: 1,287

Game reference

Samuel Urban
Goalies
Noah Erliden
Referees:
(France) Geoffrey Barcelo
(United States) Nolan Bloyer
Linesmen:
(Canada) Nicolas Boivin
(Germany) Markus Merk

	0–1	04:35 – Lindstein (Forsfjäll, Dower Nilsson) (PP)
	0–2	10:39 – Sandin Pellikka (Forsfjäll, Lindstein) (PP)
Pekarčík (Masnica, Štrbák) (PP) – 15:52	1–2
	1–3	16:44 – Edstrom (Stenberg, Kangas)
Masnica (Dvorský, Pekarčík) (PP) – 51:51	2–3
Kukumberg (Jenčko, Cedzo) – 53:59	3–3
	3–4	56:14 – Wahlberg
	3–5	59:54 – Unger Sörum (Lindstein) (EN)

6 min
Penalties
10 min
26
Shots
52

22 April 2023; 17:00	Germany	1–7 (0–3, 0–3, 1–1)	Czechia	Raiffeisen Arena, Porrentruy; Attendance: 787

Game reference

Valentin Ankirchner
Leon Willerscheid
Goalies
Michael Hrabal
Referees:
(Canada) Dominic Cadieux
(Sweden) Daniel Eriksson
Linesmen:
(Denmark) Emil Dalsgaard
(Slovakia) Oto Durmis

	0–1	02:15 – Židlický (Šimek, Dvořák) (PP)
	0–2	10:08 – Šalé (SH)
	0–3	13:09 – Šalé (PS)
	0–4	20:36 – Dvořák (Felcman, Fábry)
	0–5	23:19 – Hradec (Dvořák, Jiříček)
	0–6	25:41 – Hradec (Kučera, Matějíček)
Brandl (Bicker, Homann) – 56:42	1–6
	1–7	58:58 – Petr (Jecho, Eichler)

33 min
Penalties
16 min
30
Shots
35

23 April 2023; 13:00	Slovakia	3–4 (0–1, 1–2, 2–1)	Canada	Raiffeisen Arena, Porrentruy; Attendance: 1,751

Game reference

Lukáš Fürsten
Goalies
Carson Bjarnason
Referees:
(France) Geoffrey Barcelo
(Czech Republic) Luděk Pilný
Linesmen:
(Denmark) Emil Dalsgaard
(Czech Republic) Lukáš Rampír

	0–1	00:50 – Barlow (Price, Allen)
	0–2	23:28 – Ritchie (Wood, Celebrini)
	0–3	34:50 – Martone (MacDonell) (SH)
Dvorský (Eperješi) – 37:31	1–3
Císar (Kukumberg, Gron) – 42:24	2–3
	2–4	53:05 – Celebrini (Wood, Dragicevic) (PP)
Pekarčík (Štrbák, Dvorský) (EA) – 59:10	3–4

8 min
Penalties
6 min
25
Shots
42

23 April 2023; 17:00	Sweden	2–0 (0–0, 0–0, 2–0)	Czechia	Raiffeisen Arena, Porrentruy; Attendance: 1,558

Game reference
Noah Erliden	Goalies	Michael Hrabal	Referees: (Slovakia) Martin Jobbágy (Germany) Lukas Kohlmüller; Linesmen: (Germany) Markus Merk (Austria) Simon Riecken
Willander (Unger Sörum, Stenberg) (PP2) – 48:12 / 1–0; Stenberg (Edstrom) (ENG) – 59:55 / 2–0			Referees: (Slovakia) Martin Jobbágy (Germany) Lukas Kohlmüller; Linesmen: (Germany) Markus Merk (Austria) Simon Riecken
8 min	Penalties	10 min	Referees: (Slovakia) Martin Jobbágy (Germany) Lukas Kohlmüller; Linesmen: (Germany) Markus Merk (Austria) Simon Riecken
31	Shots	15	Referees: (Slovakia) Martin Jobbágy (Germany) Lukas Kohlmüller; Linesmen: (Germany) Markus Merk (Austria) Simon Riecken

24 April 2023; 18:30	Germany	4–6 (1–1, 3–2, 0–3)	Slovakia	Raiffeisen Arena, Porrentruy; Attendance: 548

Game reference

Leon Willerscheid
Goalies
Samuel Urban
Referees:
(United States) Nolan Bloyer
(Finland) Riku Brander
Linesmen:
(Canada) Nicolas Boivin
(United States) Shane Gustafson

	0–1	15:09 – Dvorský (Pekarčík) (PP)
Panocha (Vinzens, Sumpf) (PP) – 17:17	1–1
Sumpf (Tropmann, Bosecker) (PP) – 21:32	2–1
	2–2	22:31 – Jenčko (Štrbák, Pekarčík)
Schreiner (Müller, Tropmann) (EA) – 26:02	3–2
Bicker (Brandl, Panocha) – 29:16	4–2
	4–3	36:00 – Dvorský (Cedzo)
	4–4	51:37 – Dvorský (Chromiak, Cedzo)
	4–5	57:37 – Dvorský (Císar, Pekarčík) (PP)
	4–6	59:20 – Pekarčík (Dvorský, Štrbák) (PP, ENG)

31 min
Penalties
10 min
27
Shots
38

25 April 2023; 14:30	Sweden	3–0 (0–0, 0–0, 3–0)	Germany	Raiffeisen Arena, Porrentruy; Attendance: 2,653

Game reference

Melker Thelin
Goalies
Nico Pertuch
Referees:
(Austria) Christian Ofner
(Switzerland) Loic Ruprecht
Linesmen:
(Canada) Nicolas Boivin
(Czech Republic) Lukáš Rampír

Edstrom (Stenberg, Willander) – 50:42	1–0
Willander (Stenberg, Edstrom) (PP) – 56:31	2–0
Kangas (Nordh, Bergström) (ENG) – 58:14	3–0

2 min
Penalties
10 min
28
Shots
14

25 April 2023; 18:30	Czechia	3–8 (0–2, 2–3, 1–3)	Canada	Raiffeisen Arena, Porrentruy; Attendance: 1,586

Game reference

Michael Hrabal
Jan Kavan
Goalies
Carson Bjarnason
Referees:
(Sweden) Daniel Eriksson
(Switzerland) Micha Hebeisen
Linesmen:
(Germany) Markus Merk
(Switzerland) Dominik Schlegel

	0–1	17:16 – Barlow (Howe)
	0–2	17:40 – Wood (Ritchie)
	0–3	20:14 – Wood (Celebrini, Price)
Šalé (Petr, Hradec) (PP) – 30:04	1–3
	1–4	33:32 – Wood (Heidt, Barlow) (PP)
Felcman (Šalé) – 37:18	2–4
	2–5	38:24 – Halaburda (Pharand, Martone)
	2–6	42:54 – Martone (Halaburda, Price)
	2–7	44:49 – Lardis (Cristall, Catton) (PP)
	2–8	52:39 – Dragicevic (Celebrini, Ritchie)
Matějíček (Petr) – 56:25	3–8

8 min
Penalties
29 min
26
Shots
45

==== Group B ====
The Group B matches were played in Basel, Switzerland, from 20 to 25 April 2023.

Pos	Team	Pld	W	OTW	OTL	L	GF	GA	GD	Pts	Qualification
1	United States	4	4	0	0	0	37	6	+31	12	Advance to Quarterfinals
2	Finland	4	3	0	0	1	23	14	+9	9	Advance to Quarterfinals
3	Switzerland (H)	4	2	0	0	2	12	15	−3	6	Advance to Quarterfinals
4	Latvia	4	1	0	0	3	5	17	−12	3	Advance to Quarterfinals
5	Norway	4	0	0	0	4	3	28	−25	0	Advance to Relegation round

Source: IIHF
(H) Host

20 April 2023; 16:00	United States	7–1 (0–0, 3–0, 4–1)	Latvia	St. Jakob Arena, Basel; Attendance: 810

Game reference

Trey Augustine
Hampton Slukynsky
Goalies
Aksels Ozols
Nils Mauriņš
Referees:
(France) Geoffrey Barcelo
(Finland) Riku Brander
Linesmen:
(Germany) Markus Merk
(Sweden) Tobias Nordlander

Eiserman (Hagens, Hutson) (PP) – 20:59	1–0
Leonard (Perreault, Terrance) (PP) – 30:05	2–0
Smith (Leonard, Hutson) – 34:15	3–0
Moore (Hutson, Eiserman) (PP) – 40:22	4–0
	4–1	41:43 – Niedrājs (SH)
Smith (Perreault, Leonard) (PP2) – 44:05	5–1
Guzzo (Nelson, Minnetian) – 54:15	6–1
Schulz (Moore, Terrance) – 55:29	7–1

8 min
Penalties
39 min
36
Shots
24

20 April 2023; 20:00	Finland	4–2 (0–0, 2–2, 2–0)	Switzerland	St. Jakob Arena, Basel; Attendance: 1,988

Game reference

Eemil Vinni
Goalies
Ewan Huet
Referees:
(United States) Nolan Bloyer
(Czech Republic) Luděk Pilný
Linesmen:
(Canada) Nicolas Boivin
(Slovakia) Oto Durmis

Järventie (Nurmi, Kiiskinen) (PP) – 25:41	1–0
Leppä (Lind) – 26:16	2–0
	2–1	36:07 – Braillard (Schneller, Dorthe) (PP)
	2–2	38:24 – Wagner (E. Meier)
Halttunen (Alasiurua, Pieniniemi) – 51:41	3–2
Nurmi (Kiviharju, Hynninen) (ENG) – 57:59	4–2

10 min
Penalties
12 min
37
Shots
18

21 April 2023; 16:00	Latvia	2–5 (0–1, 0–3, 2–1)	Finland	St. Jakob Arena, Basel; Attendance: 342

Game reference

Aksels Ozols
Linards Feldbergs
Goalies
Visa Vedenpää
Referees:
(Canada) Dominic Cadieux
(Sweden) Daniel Eriksson
Linesmen:
(United States) Shane Gustafson
(Switzerland) Dominik Schlegel

	0–1	01:25 – Kumpulainen (Uronen)
	0–2	30:53 – Hynninen (Nurmi, Järventie) (PP)
	0–3	37:12 – Halttunen (Helenius, Alasiurua)
	0–4	38:07 – Uronen (Muhonen, Järventie)
Niedrājs (Ansons) – 44:52	1–4
	1–5	46:12 – Kumpulainen (Kiviharju, Kangas)
Streikišs (Bulāns, Livšics) (PP) – 53:59	2–5

4 min
Penalties
6 min
21
Shots
47

21 April 2023; 20:00	Norway	0–5 (0–2, 0–2, 0–1)	Switzerland	St. Jakob Arena, Basel; Attendance: 2,126

Game reference

Marius Bjørnsgaard
Martin Lundberg
Goalies
Ewan Huet
Referees:
(Finland) Riku Brander
(Czech Republic) Adam Kika
Linesmen:
(Sweden) Tobias Nordlander
(Czech Republic) Lukáš Rampír

0–1	07:58 – Kaderli (Gredig, Muggli)
0–2	12:51 – R. Meier (Braillard, S. Meier) (PP)
0–3	27:30 – Dorthe (Reber, Ustinkov)
0–4	31:04 – Schneller (Reber, Gredig)
0–5	59:14 – Wagner (E. Meier)

16 min
Penalties
14 min
20
Shots
23

22 April 2023; 19:00	Norway	1–12 (0–4, 1–5, 0–3)	United States	St. Jakob Arena, Basel; Attendance: 732

Game reference

Martin Lundberg
Marius Bjørnsgaard
Goalies
Carsen Musser
Referees:
(Switzerland) Micha Hebeisen
(Germany) Lukas Kohlmüller
Linesmen:
(Finland) Niko Jusi
(Austria) Simon Riecken

	0–1	01:45 – Eiserman (Moore, Vote) (PP)
	0–2	03:54 – Perreault (Smith)
	0–3	10:29 – Eiserman (Fine)
	0–4	13:04 – Leonard (Perreault, Hutson)
Vatne (Karlsen, Amundsen) – 25:35	1–4
	1–5	26:05 – Smith (Leonard, Perreault)
	1–6	29:15 – Perreault (Leonard, Smith)
	1–7	31:42 – Eiserman (Hagens)
	1–8	32:37 – Nelson (Hendrickson, Fischer)
	1–9	33:10 – Perreault (Vote, Smith)
	1–10	45:19 – Slaggert (Nelson) (SH)
	1–11	48:34 – Eiserman (Vote, Schulz) (PP)
	1–12	54:10 – Moore (Fine, Terrance)

6 min
Penalties
8 min
15
Shots
61

23 April 2022; 15:00	Switzerland	5–1 (2–1, 1–0, 2–0)	Latvia	St. Jakob Arena, Basel; Attendance: 3,277

Game reference

Ewan Huet
Goalies
Aksels Ozols
Referees:
(Canada) Dominic Cadieux
(Austria) Christian Ofner
Linesmen:
(Finland) Niko Jusi
(Sweden) Tobias Nordlander

Reber (Pedrazzini, Bünzli) – 02:06	1–0
	1–1	13:25 – Mateiko (Livšics, Krūmiņš) (PP)
Braillard (Bünzli) (SH) – 18:13	2–1
E. Meier (Wagner, Ustinkov) – 30:31	3–1
Ustinkov (Reber, E. Meier) (PP) – 44:23	4–1
Braillard (Graf, Schneller) (PP) – 57:37	5–1

10 min
Penalties
8 min
21
Shots
18

23 April 2023; 19:00	United States	8–4 (2–2, 3–1, 3–1)	Finland	St. Jakob Arena, Basel; Attendance: 1,442

Game reference

Trey Augustine
Goalies
Eemil Vinni
Referees:
(Sweden) Daniel Eriksson
(Switzerland) Loic Ruprecht
Linesmen:
(United States) Shane Gustafson
(Switzerland) Dominik Schlegel

Moore (Fine) – 01:04	1–0
Minnetian (Smith, Perreault)	2–0
	2–1	13:58 – Helenius (Kiviharju, Kumpulainen) (PP)
	2–2	19:22 – Alasiurua (Halttunen, Helenius)
Eiserman (Huutson, Hagens) (PP) – 23:58	3–2
Hagens (Vote) – 28:22	4–2
	4–3	33:19 – Halttunen (Kuusla, Leppä)
Smith (Buium) – 38:54	5–3
Terrance (Perreault, Smith) (PP) – 43:00	6–3
	6–4	43:10 – Kiiskinen
Perreault (Smith, Leonard) – 55:14	7–4
Leonard (Perreault, Smith) – 59:01	8–4

8 min
Penalties
6 min
33
Shots
31

24 April 2023; 20:00	Latvia	1–0 (0–0, 0–0, 1–0)	Norway	St. Jakob Arena, Basel; Attendance: 372

Game reference
Aksels Ozols	Goalies	Martin Lundberg	Referees: (Switzerland) Micha Hebeisen (Czech Republic) Adam Kika; Linesmen: (Denmark) Emil Dalsgaard (Slovakia) Oto Durmis
Mots (Mateiko, Bulāns) – 53:03 / 1–0			Referees: (Switzerland) Micha Hebeisen (Czech Republic) Adam Kika; Linesmen: (Denmark) Emil Dalsgaard (Slovakia) Oto Durmis
8 min	Penalties	4 min	Referees: (Switzerland) Micha Hebeisen (Czech Republic) Adam Kika; Linesmen: (Denmark) Emil Dalsgaard (Slovakia) Oto Durmis
19	Shots	19	Referees: (Switzerland) Micha Hebeisen (Czech Republic) Adam Kika; Linesmen: (Denmark) Emil Dalsgaard (Slovakia) Oto Durmis

25 April 2023; 16:00	Switzerland	0–10 (0–4, 0–2, 0–4)	United States	St. Jakob Arena, Basel; Attendance: 2,091

Game reference

Christian Kirsch
Goalies
Trey Augustine
Referees:
(Finland) Riku Brander
(Slovakia) Martin Jobbágy
Linesmen:
(Slovakia) Oto Durmis
(Austria) Simon Riecken

0–1	00:15 – Fortescue (Leonard, Hutson)
0–2	16:11 – Eiserman (Hagens, Vote)
0–3	16:27 – Leonard (Buium, Smith)
0–4	19:07 – Eiserman (Smith, Vote)
0–5	20:49 – Perreault (Smith, Leonard)
0–6	31:56 – Leonard (Perreault, Terrance) (PP)
0–7	41:00 – Smith (Perreault, Hutson)
0–8	46:37 – Leonard (Smith, Perreault)
0–9	47:52 – Buium (PS)
0–10	55:32 – Moore (Fine, Buium)

4 min
Penalties
6 min
17
Shots
34

25 April 2023; 20:00	Finland	10–2 (4–1, 4–0, 2–1)	Norway	St. Jakob Arena, Basel; Attendance: 831

Game reference

Noa Vali
Goalies
Marius Bjørnsgaard
Referees:
(Germany) Lukas Kohlmüller
(Czech Republic) Luděk Pilný
Linesmen:
(Finland) Niko Jusi
(Sweden) Tobias Nordlander

Kiiskinen (Nurmi, Kiviharju) – 01:09	1–0
Leppä (Eliseev) (SH) – 06:29	2–0
Väisänen (Kiviharju, Järventie) – 12:30	3–0
Kiiskinen (Kiviharju, Nurmi) – 14:45	4–0
	4–1	15:54 – Indergaard (Sætre, Myhre) (PP)
Muhonen (Hynninen, Kiiskinen) – 30:30	5–1
Järventie – 31:23	6–1
Halttunen (Väisänen) – 32:49	7–1
Kumpulainen (Halttunen, Jokinen) (PP) – 39:46	8–1
	8–2	44:35 – Granath (Bjørnsgaard) (SH)
Halttunen (Kiviharju, Kumpulainen) (PP) – 55:18	9–2
Helenius (Halttunen, Kangas) – 58:34	10–2

6 min
Penalties
10 min
38
Shots
15

=== Relegation round ===
27 April 2023; 11:00	Germany	1–6 (0–2, 0–2, 1–2)	Norway	Raiffeisen Arena, Porrentruy; Attendance: 2,236

Game reference

Leon Willerscheid
Goalies
Martin Lundberg
Referees:
(France) Geoffrey Barcelo
(Czech Republic) Luděk Pilný
Linesmen:
(Denmark) Emil Dalsgaard
(Finland) Niko Jusi

	0–1	05:23 – Indergaard (Vatne, Semmerud-Garcia)
	0–2	07:52 – Sjøthun (Karlsen)
	0–3	34:46 – Klungtveit (Vatne)
	0–4	38:37 – Vatne (Solberg, Haugen) (PP)
	0–5	40:58 – Vatne (Amundsen, Myhre)
Vinzens (Hildebrand, Focks) – 44:28	1–5
	1–6	59:58 – Støen (Boger) (PP)

26 min
Penalties
28 min
35
Shots
10

29 April 2023; 11:00	Norway	3–2 (1–1, 2–0, 0–1)	Germany	Raiffeisen Arena, Porrentruy; Attendance: 409

Game reference

Martin Lundberg
Goalies
Nico Pertuch
Referees:
(France) Geoffrey Barcelo
(United States) Nolan Bloyer
Linesmen:
(Sweden) Tobias Nordlander
(Switzerland) Dominik Schlegel

	0–1	02:00 – Panocha (Sumpf, Vinzens) (PP)
Myhre (Indergaard, Granath) (PP) – 05:02	1–1
Hagen (Granath, Indergaard) (PP) – 25:26	2–1
Klungtveit (Støen, Karlsen) – 33:08	3–1
	3–2	59:52 – Sumpf (Vinzens, Niehus) (EA)

4 min
Penalties
14 min
35
Shots
16

=== Playoff round ===
Winning teams will be reseeded in accordance with the following ranking:

1. higher position in the group
2. higher number of points
3. better goal difference
4. higher number of goals scored for
5. better seeding coming into the tournament (final placement at the 2022 IIHF World U18 Championships).

Rank	Team	Group	Pos	Pts	GD	GF	Seed
1	United States	B	1	12	+31	37	2
2	Sweden	A	1	12	+15	18	1
3	Finland	B	2	9	+9	23	3
4	Canada	A	2	9	+6	20	5
5	Switzerland	B	3	6	−3	12	6
6	Slovakia	A	3	5	0	15	9
7	Czechia	A	4	4	−2	12	4
8	Latvia	B	4	3	−12	5	7

==== Bracket ====
Quarterfinals
27 April – Porrentruy
1A Sweden	6
4B Latvia	1
27 April – Basel
2A Canada	7
3B Switzerland	3
27 April – Basel
1B United States	4
4A Czechia	1
27 April – Porrentruy
2B Finland	2
3A Slovakia	3

Semifinals
29 April – Basel
1 United States	7
6 Slovakia	1
29 April – Basel
2 Sweden	7
4 Canada	2

Gold Medal Game
30 April – Basel
1 United States (OT)	3
2 Sweden	2
Bronze Medal Game
30 April – Basel
4 Canada (OT)	4
6 Slovakia	3

==== Quarterfinals ====
27 April 2023; 12:30	United States	4–1 (1–0, 1–0, 2–1)	Czechia	St. Jakob Arena, Basel; Attendance: 654

Game reference

Trey Augustine
Goalies
Michael Hrabal
Referees:
(Canada) Dominic Cadieux
(Germany) Lukas Kohlmüller
Linesmen:
(Sweden) Tobias Nordlander
(Austria) Simon Riecken

Smith (Hutson, Perreault) – 12:54	1–0
Leonard (Schulz) – 29:07	2–0
	2–1	50:46 – Petr (Šalé, Štancl)
Nelson (Hendrickson) – 54:07	3–1
Vote (Hutson, Moore) – 55:03	4–1

2 min
Penalties
6 min
52
Shots
12

27 April 2023; 15:00	Finland	2–3 (0–1, 0–2, 2–0)	Slovakia	Raiffeisen Arena, Porrentruy; Attendance: 2,378

Game reference

Eemil Vinni
Goalies
Samuel Urban
Referees:
(Sweden) Daniel Eriksson
(Switzerland) Micha Hebeisen
Linesmen:
(Canada) Nicolas Boivin
(United States) Shane Gustafson

	0–1	00:36 – Dvorský (Eperješi, Cedzo)
	0–2	22:50 – Masnica (Dvorský, Pekarčík) (PP)
	0–3	33:47 – Cedzo (Pekarčík, Dvorský)
Halttunen (Junkkari, Helenius) – 45:53	1–3
Järventie (Halttunen, Helenius) (EA) – 59:50	2–3

4 min
Penalties
6 min
56
Shots
16

27 April 2023; 17:30	Canada	7–3 (1–1, 5–1, 1–1)	Switzerland	St. Jakob Arena, Basel; Attendance: 1,498

Game reference

Carson Bjarnason
Goalies
Ewan Huet
Christian Kirsch
Referees:
(United States) Nolan Bloyer
(Finland) Riku Brander
Linesmen:
(Slovakia) Oto Durmis
(Czech Republic) Lukáš Rampír

Celebrini (Heidt, Dragicevic) (PP) – 16:42	1–0
	1–1	17:16 – Bünzli (Reber, Ustinkov)
Ritchie (Celebrini) – 20:37	2–1
Wood (Celebrini, Ritchie) – 24:53	3–1
Cristall (Catton, MacDonell) – 26:53	4–1
Celebrini (Wood, Price) – 35:46	5–1
Catton (MacDonell, Gibson) – 37:00	6–1
	6–2	39:56 – Wagner (E. Meier, Zehnder)
Cristall – 42:04	7–2
	7–3	54:09 – Wagner (E. Meier)

2 min
Penalties
10 min
33
Shots
31

27 April 2023; 20:00	Sweden	6–1 (2–0, 2–1, 2–0)	Latvia	Raiffeisen Arena, Porrentruy; Attendance: 572

Game reference

Noah Erliden
Goalies
Aksels Ozols
Referees:
(Slovakia) Martin Jobbágy
(Czech Republic) Adam Kika
Linesmen:
(Germany) Markus Merk
(Switzerland) Dominik Schlegel

Nordh (Zether, Willander) – 04:17	1–0
Edstrom (Dower Nilsson, Bergström) – 17:42	2–0
Stenberg (Willander, Unger Sörum) (PP) – 23:11	3–0
	3–1	29:57 – Livšics (Bulāns, Ansons) (PP2)
Dower Nilsson (Forsfjäll, Sandin Pellikka) (PP) – 35:54	4–1
Stenberg (Unger Sörum, Sandin Pellikka) (EA) – 40:42	5–1
Zether (Nordh) – 58:56	6–1

8 min
Penalties
4 min
55
Shots
16

==== Semifinals ====
29 April 2023; 15:00	United States	7–1 (3–0, 2–1, 2–0)	Slovakia	St. Jakob Arena, Basel; Attendance: 2,475

Game reference

Trey Augustine
Goalies
Samuel Urban
Lukáš Fürsten
Referees:
(Canada) Dominic Cadieux
(Sweden) Daniel Eriksson
Linesmen:
(Canada) Nicolas Boivin
(Czech Republic) Lukáš Rampír

Smith (Perreault, Leonard) – 04:16	1–0
Hutson (Moore, Fortescue) – 14:18	2–0
Smith (Perreault, Buium) (PP) – 19:26	3–0
Smith (Hutson, Leonard) – 20:50	4–0
Guzzo (Nelson, Fortescue) – 23:44	5–0
	5–1	31:16 – Dvorský (Cedzo, Pekarčík)
Nelson (Minnetian) – 57:15	6–1
Eiserman (Minnetian, Guzzo) (PP) – 58:45	7–1

8 min
Penalties
33 min
50
Shots
28

29 April 2023; 19:00	Sweden	7–2 (2–2, 4–0, 1–0)	Canada	St. Jakob Arena, Basel; Attendance: 1,585

Game reference

Noah Erliden
Goalies
Carson Bjarnason
Gabriel D'Aigle
Referees:
(Finland) Riku Brander
(Switzerland) Micha Hebeisen
Linesmen:
(Slovakia) Oto Durmis
(United States) Shane Gustafson

	0–1	04:31 – Celebrini (Morin) (PP)
Willander (Unger Sörum, Stenberg) (PP) – 06:59	1–1
	1–2	14:07 – MacDonell (Allen, Cristall)
Edstrom (Hurtig, Stenberg) – 14:34	2–2
Stenberg (Bergström, Sandin Pellikka) – 23:57	3–2
Edstrom (Unger Sörum, Stenberg) – 32:47	4–2
Wahlberg (Unger Sörum, Willander) (PP) – 34:01	5–2
Stenberg (Unger Sörum, Edstrom) – 38:50	6–2
Forsfjäll (Sandin Pellikka, Dower Nilsson) (PP) – 53:54	7–2

70 min
Penalties
18 min
29
Shots
35

==== Bronze medal game ====
30 April 2023; 15:00	Canada	4–3 OT (0–0, 2–1, 1–2); OT: (1–0)	Slovakia	St. Jakob Arena, Basel; Attendance: 2,598

Game reference

Gabriel D'Aigle
Goalies
Samuel Urban
Referees:
(Finland) Riku Brander
(Sweden) Daniel Eriksson
Linesmen:
(Slovakia) Oto Durmis
(United States) Shane Gustafson

Celebrini (Price, Wood) – 30:23	1–0
	1–1	38:45 – Dvorský (Masnica, Štrbák) (PP)
Barlow (Wood, Gibson) – 39:47	2–1
	2–2	41:28 – Císar
	2–3	55:33 – Jenčko (Císar, Kukumberg)
Wood (Cristall, Celebrini) (EA) – 58:50	3–3
Celebrini (Wood, Gibson) – 67:51	4–3

14 min
Penalties
6 min
41
Shots
29

==== Gold medal game ====
30 April 2023; 19:00	United States	3–2 OT (0–1, 0–1, 2–0); OT: (1–0)	Sweden	St. Jakob Arena, Basel; Attendance: 4,342

Game reference

Trey Augustine
Goalies
Noah Erliden
Referees:
(Canada) Dominic Cadieux
(Switzerland) Micha Hebeisen
Linesmen:
(Canada) Nicolas Boivin
(Czech Republic) Lukáš Rampír

	0–1	09:33 – Ståhlberg (Wahlberg, Dower Nilsson)
	0–2	26:14 – Nordh (Sandin Pellikka, Forsfjäll) (PP)
Nelson (Buium, Guzzo) – 49:44	1–2
Terrance (Eiserman, Smith) (PP) – 56:44	2–2
Leonard (Hutson, Moore) – 62:20	3–2

10 min
Penalties
4 min
41
Shots
32

=== Final standings ===
Pos	Grp	Team	Pld	W	OTW	OTL	L	GF	GA	GD	Pts	Final result
1	B	United States	7	6	1	0	0	51	10	+41	20	Champions
2	A	Sweden	7	6	0	1	0	33	9	+24	19	Runners-up
3	A	Canada	7	4	1	0	2	33	27	+6	14	Third place
4	A	Slovakia	7	2	1	1	3	22	28	−6	9	Fourth place
5	B	Finland	5	3	0	0	2	25	17	+8	9	Eliminated in Quarterfinals
6	B	Switzerland (H)	5	2	0	0	3	15	22	−7	6	Eliminated in Quarterfinals
7	A	Czechia	5	1	0	1	3	13	18	−5	4	Eliminated in Quarterfinals
8	B	Latvia	5	1	0	0	4	6	23	−17	3	Eliminated in Quarterfinals
9	B	Norway	6	2	0	0	4	12	31	−19	6	Avoided Relegation
10	A	Germany	6	0	0	0	6	8	33	−25	0	Relegated to the 2024 Division I A

Source: IIHF
(H) Host

=== Statistics ===
==== Scoring leaders ====
Pos	Player	Country	GP	G	A	Pts	+/−	PIM
1	Will Smith	United States	7	9	11	20	+15	2
2	Gabe Perreault	United States	7	5	13	18	+15	0
3	Ryan Leonard	United States	7	8	9	17	+16	4
4	Otto Stenberg	Sweden	7	7	9	16	+13	4
5	Macklin Celebrini	Canada	7	6	9	15	+11	6
6	Dalibor Dvorský	Slovakia	7	8	5	13	−1	6
7	Matthew Wood	Canada	7	7	6	13	+12	6
8	Cole Hutson	United States	7	1	11	12	+14	8
9	Cole Eiserman	United States	7	9	2	11	+3	8
10	Axel Sandin-Pellikka	Sweden	7	2	9	11	+8	0

GP = Games played; G = Goals; A = Assists; Pts = Points; +/− = Plus–minus; PIM = Penalties In Minutes
Source: IIHF

==== Goaltending leaders ====
(minimum 40% team's total ice time)

Pos	Player	Country	TOI	GA	GAA	SA	Sv%	SO
1	Noah Erliden	Sweden	362:20	9	1.49	163	94.48	2
2	Trey Augustine	United States	335:32	9	1.61	136	93.38	0
3	Michael Hrabal	Czechia	289:09	15	3.11	188	92.02	0
4	Samuel Urban	Slovakia	336:30	21	3.74	227	90.75	0
5	Ewan Huet	Switzerland	215:37	9	2.50	90	90.00	1

TOI = Time on ice (minutes:seconds); GA = Goals against; GAA = Goals against average; SA = Shots against; Sv% = Save percentage; SO = Shutouts
Source: IIHF

=== Awards ===
- Best players selected by the directorate:
  - Best Goaltender: (Sweden) Noah Erliden
  - Best Defenceman: (Sweden) Axel Sandin Pellikka
  - Best Forward: (United States) Will Smith

Source: IIHF

- Media All-Stars:
  - MVP: (United States) Will Smith
  - Goaltender: (Sweden) Noah Erliden
  - Defencemen: (Sweden) Axel Sandin Pellikka / (United States) Cole Hutson
  - Forwards: (United States) Will Smith / (Sweden) Otto Stenberg / (Slovakia) Dalibor Dvorský

== Division I ==
=== Group A ===
The tournament was played in Angers, France, from 23 to 29 April 2023.

Pos	Team	Pld	W	OTW	OTL	L	GF	GA	GD	Pts	Promotion or relegation
1	Kazakhstan	5	4	0	0	1	22	9	+13	12	Promoted to the 2024 Top Division
2	Denmark	5	3	1	0	1	26	11	+15	11	
3	Japan	5	2	1	0	2	13	15	−2	8	
4	Hungary	5	2	0	1	2	8	15	−7	7	
5	Ukraine	5	0	2	1	2	8	16	−8	5	
6	France (H)	5	0	0	2	3	7	18	−11	2	Relegated to the 2024 Division I B

Source: IIHF
Rules for classification: 1) points; 2) head-to-head points; 3) head-to-head goal difference; 4) head-to-head number of goals scored; 5) result against closest best-ranked team outside tied teams; 6) result against second-best ranked team outside tied teams; 7) seeding before tournament.
(H) Host

=== Group B ===
The tournament was played in Bled, Slovenia, from 10 to 16 April 2023.

Pos	Team	Pld	W	OTW	OTL	L	GF	GA	GD	Pts	Promotion or relegation
1	Austria	5	4	0	0	1	21	10	+11	12	Promoted to the 2024 Division I A
2	Slovenia (H)	5	3	1	0	1	20	13	+7	11	
3	Italy	5	3	0	1	1	9	9	0	10	
4	South Korea	5	2	0	0	3	17	15	+2	6	
5	Estonia	5	1	0	0	4	8	21	−13	3 (Note: Poland 1–2 Estonia)	
6	Poland	5	1	0	0	4	9	16	−7	3	Relegated to the 2024 Division II A

Source: IIHF
Rules for classification: 1) points; 2) head-to-head points; 3) head-to-head goal difference; 4) head-to-head number of goals scored; 5) result against closest best-ranked team outside tied teams; 6) result against second-best ranked team outside tied teams; 7) seeding before tournament.
(H) Host

== Division II ==
=== Group A ===
The tournament was played in Belgrade, Serbia, from 9 to 15 April 2023.

Pos	Team	Pld	W	OTW	OTL	L	GF	GA	GD	Pts	Promotion or relegation
1	Lithuania	5	4	1	0	0	22	5	+17	14	Promoted to the 2024 Division I B
2	Croatia	5	4	0	0	1	28	9	+19	12	
3	Great Britain	5	2	1	1	1	14	16	−2	9	
4	Serbia (H)	5	1	0	1	3	15	24	−9	4 (Note: Serbia 6–3 Romania)	
5	Romania	5	1	0	1	3	11	29	−18	4	
6	Spain	5	0	1	0	4	10	17	−7	2	Relegated to the 2024 Division II B

Source: IIHF
Rules for classification: 1) points; 2) head-to-head points; 3) head-to-head goal difference; 4) head-to-head number of goals scored; 5) result against closest best-ranked team outside tied teams; 6) result against second-best ranked team outside tied teams; 7) seeding before tournament.
(H) Host

=== Group B ===
The tournament was played in Sofia, Bulgaria, from 27 March to 2 April 2023.

Pos	Team	Pld	W	OTW	OTL	L	GF	GA	GD	Pts	Promotion or relegation
1	Netherlands	5	5	0	0	0	26	7	+19	15	Promoted to the 2024 Division II A
2	China	5	4	0	0	1	26	12	+14	12	
3	Chinese Taipei	5	2	0	0	3	16	25	−9	6 (Note: Chinese Taipei 3 points, +1 GD; Bulgaria 3 points, 0 GD; Australia 3 points, –1 GD)	
4	Bulgaria (H)	5	2	0	0	3	12	16	−4	6	
5	Australia	5	2	0	0	3	12	20	−8	6	
6	Belgium	5	0	0	0	5	8	20	−12	0	Relegated to the 2024 Division III A

Source: IIHF
Rules for classification: 1) points; 2) head-to-head points; 3) head-to-head goal difference; 4) head-to-head number of goals scored; 5) result against closest best-ranked team outside tied teams; 6) result against second-best ranked team outside tied teams; 7) seeding before tournament.
(H) Host

== Division III ==
=== Group A ===
The tournament was played in Akureyri, Iceland, from 12 to 18 March 2023.

Pos	Team	Pld	W	OTW	OTL	L	GF	GA	GD	Pts	Promotion or relegation
1	Israel	5	4	0	0	1	39	5	+34	12 (Note: Iceland 1–5 Israel)	Promoted to the 2024 Division II B
2	Iceland (H)	5	4	0	0	1	36	12	+24	12	
3	Turkey	5	3	0	0	2	27	15	+12	9 (Note: Turkey 5–3 Mexico)	
4	Mexico	5	3	0	0	2	31	16	+15	9	
5	Bosnia and Herzegovina	5	1	0	0	4	8	29	−21	3	
6	Luxembourg	5	0	0	0	5	3	67	−64	0	Relegated to the 2024 Division III B

Source: IIHF
Rules for classification: 1) points; 2) head-to-head points; 3) head-to-head goal difference; 4) head-to-head number of goals scored; 5) result against closest best-ranked team outside tied teams; 6) result against second-best ranked team outside tied teams; 7) seeding before tournament.
(H) Host

=== Group B ===
The tournament was played in Cape Town, South Africa, from 13 to 16 March 2023.

Pos	Team	Pld	W	OTW	OTL	L	GF	GA	GD	Pts	Promotion
1	New Zealand	3	2	0	0	1	15	8	+7	6 (Note: New Zealand 3 points, +1 GD; Hong Kong 3 points, 0 GD; Thailand 3 points, –1 GD)	Promoted to the 2024 Division III A
2	Hong Kong	3	2	0	0	1	13	11	+2	6	
3	Thailand	3	2	0	0	1	14	9	+5	6	
4	South Africa (H)	3	0	0	0	3	4	18	−14	0	

Source: IIHF
Rules for classification: 1) points; 2) head-to-head points; 3) head-to-head goal difference; 4) head-to-head number of goals scored; 5) result against closest best-ranked team outside tied teams; 6) result against second-best ranked team outside tied teams; 7) seeding before tournament.
(H) Host
