= Gabe Perreault =

Canadian-American ice hockey player (born 2005)

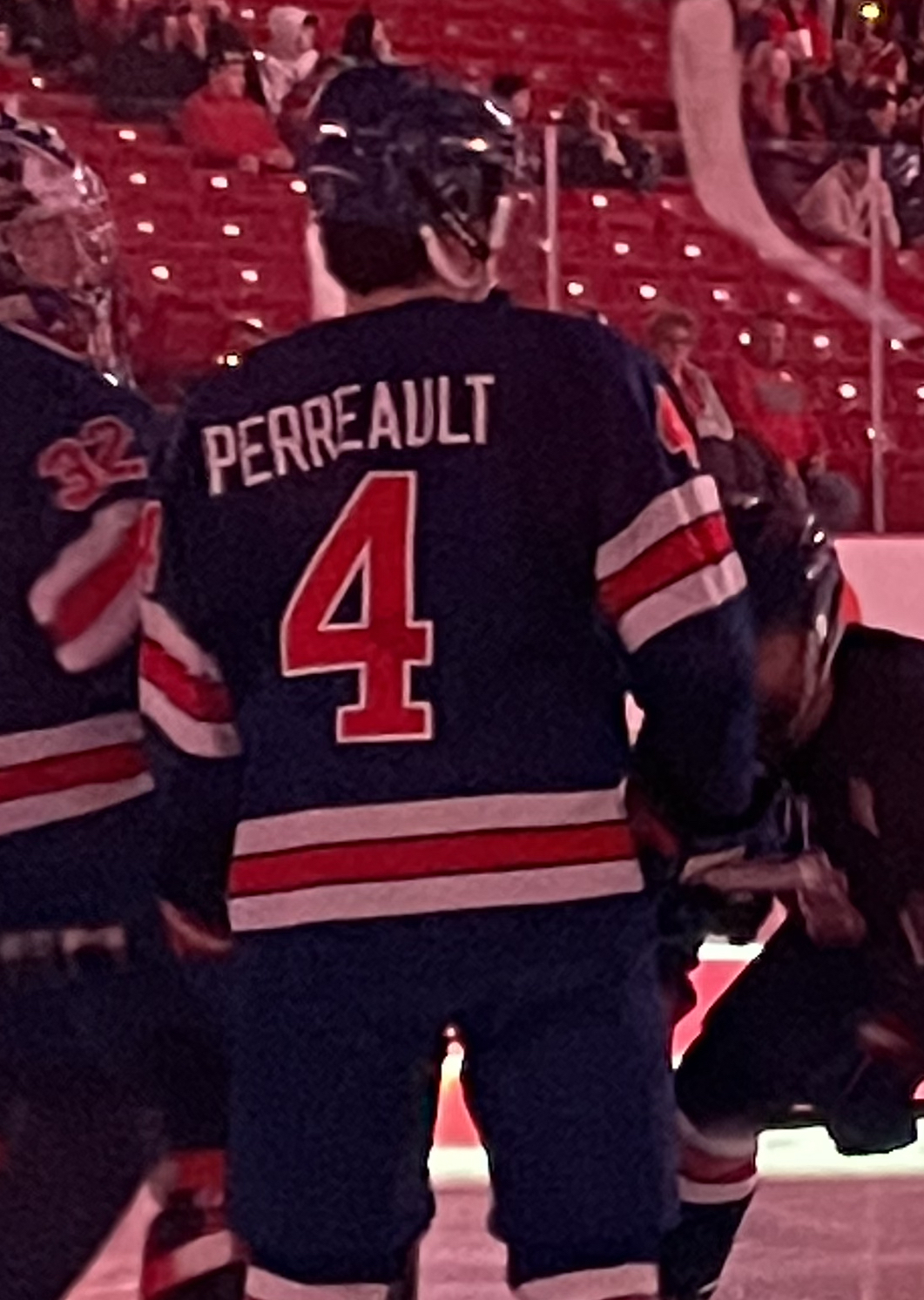
- Perreault playing with the USA Hockey National Team Development Program in 2022
- Born: May 7, 2005 (age 21) Sherbrooke, Quebec, Canada
- Height: 5 ft 11 in (180 cm)
- Weight: 180 lb (82 kg; 12 st 12 lb)
- Position: Right wing
- Shoots: Left
- NHL team: New York Rangers
- NHL draft: 23rd overall, 2023; New York Rangers
- Playing career: 2025–present

Gabriel Perreault (born May 7, 2005) is a Canadian-American professional ice hockey player who is a right winger for the New York Rangers of the National Hockey League (NHL). He was drafted 23rd overall by the Rangers in the 2023 NHL entry draft. He played college ice hockey at Boston College.

== Playing career ==
=== Junior ===
In Perreault's first year in the national program, he recorded 18 goals and 32 assists in 51 games with the under-17 team. In his draft-eligible year, he was a winger on a line with Will Smith and Ryan Leonard and recorded 53 goals and 79 assists for 132 points, the most points and assists in a single season by any player in the history of the USA Hockey National Team Development Program (USNTDP).

=== College ===
Perreault began his college ice hockey career for Boston College during the 2023–24 season. In his freshman year he recorded 19 goals and 41 assists in 36 games. He finished second among all NCAA players in assists and tied for fourth in points. Following the season he was named to the All-Hockey East Second Team, Hockey East All-Rookie Team, and an AHCA East Second Team All-American. During the 2024–25 season, in his sophomore year, he recorded 16 goals and 32 assists in 37 games. Following the season he was named to the All-Hockey East First Team. Perreault finished his collegiate career with 35 goals and 73 assists in 73 games. Over those two seasons, he ranked tied for second in assists and third in points (108) among all NCAA players.

=== Professional ===
On March 31, 2025, Perreault signed a three-year, entry-level contract with the New York Rangers. He made his NHL debut for the Rangers on April 2, against the Minnesota Wild. He ended the season playing five games for the Rangers.

Perreault was assigned to the Hartford Wolf Pack, New York's American Hockey League (AHL) affiliate, on October 3, 2025, as one of the Rangers' last cuts before the start of the 2025–26 NHL season. He was recalled to the Rangers on November 9, after recording five goals and five assists in 10 games for Hartford. Perreault earned his first NHL point with an assist against the Nashville Predators on November 10. He scored his first NHL goal against the St. Louis Blues on December 18. Perreault recorded his first NHL hat-trick on April 4, 2026, in a 4–1 win against the Detroit Red Wings.

== International play ==
Medal record

Men's ice hockey

Representing the United States

World Junior Championships
Gold medal – first place	2024 Sweden	
Gold medal – first place	2025 Canada	

World U18 Championships
Gold medal – first place	2023 Switzerland	

Perreault represented the United States at the 2023 World U18 Championships where he ranked second on the team in scoring with five goals and 13 assists in seven games and won a gold medal.

On December 16, 2023, Perreault was named to the United States junior team to compete at the 2024 World Junior Championships. He recorded three goals and seven assists in seven games and won a gold medal. He then represented the United States at the 2025 World Junior Championships, where he ranked second on the team in scoring, and would equal his performance in the proceeding World Juniors, with three goals and seven assists in seven games and won a gold medal. He was subsequently named to the media all-star team. He helped the United States win back-to-back gold medals at the World Junior Championship for the first time in history.

== Playing style ==
In 2023, analyst and former NHL player Colby Cohen praised Perreault's "remarkable offensive hockey IQ," saying that "His adept understanding of the opposing team's defensive spacing, coupled with his skill in identifying high-threat areas, has showcased his ability to be one or two steps ahead of the rest." Although Perreault is not the strongest skater, which may have contributed to his falling to the 23rd pick of the draft, Boston College coach Greg Brown said that "His anticipation and thinking are at such a high level, you don't even notice. He works very hard, his skating will pick up. He's usually taking two steps in the right direction before anyone might know. It's certainly not a problem for him."

Prior to the 2024–25 season, USA Today writer Vincent Z. Mercogliano rated him as the Rangers best prospect, praising his vision and hockey sense. The Hockey News also rated him as the Rangers' best prospect, saying "He's got oodles of hockey sense and a knack for getting pucks to sticks. He's a brilliant playmaker." McKeen's Hockey also rated him the Rangers' top prospect, noting that he "upgraded his strength and quickness" in the past year. Scout Jess Rubenstein compared him to Hart Memorial Trophy winner Martin St. Louis, who was also small but an effective scorer.

Prior to the 2025–26 season, The Hockey News writer Stan Fischler rated Perrault as the Rangers' best prospect, as did Mercogliano of The Athletic.

== Personal life ==
Perreault is the youngest son of former professional ice hockey player Yanic Perreault. He is of French Canadian origin, born in his father's hometown of Sherbrooke, Quebec, and raised in Hinsdale, Illinois. His older brother, Jacob, is also a professional ice hockey player and was drafted by the Anaheim Ducks in 2020. His oldest brother Jeremy has coached ice hockey. His sister Liliane last played for SDE Hockey of the Swedish Women's Hockey League (SDHL) in 2024–25.

== Career statistics ==
=== Regular season and playoffs ===
			Regular season					Playoffs
Season	Team	League	GP	G	A	Pts	PIM	GP	G	A	Pts	PIM
2021–22	U.S. National Development Team	USHL	58	18	35	53	12	—	—	—	—	—
2022–23	U.S. National Development Team	USHL	63	53	69	132	8	—	—	—	—	—
2023–24	Boston College	HE	36	19	41	60	29	—	—	—	—	—
2024–25	Boston College	HE	37	16	32	48	25	—	—	—	—	—
2024–25	New York Rangers	NHL	5	0	0	0	0	—	—	—	—	—
2025–26	Hartford Wolf Pack	AHL	20	10	7	17	14	—	—	—	—	—
2025–26	New York Rangers	NHL	49	12	15	27	10	—	—	—	—	—
NHL totals			54	12	15	27	10	—	—	—	—	—

=== International ===
Year	Team	Event	Result	GP	G	A	Pts	PIM
2023	United States	U18	1st place, gold medalist(s)	7	5	13	18	0
2024	United States	WJC	1st place, gold medalist(s)	7	3	7	10	2
2025	United States	WJC	1st place, gold medalist(s)	7	3	7	10	0
Junior totals				21	11	27	38	2

== Awards and honors ==
Award	Year	Ref
College
All-Hockey East Second Team	2024	
Hockey East All-Rookie Team	2024	
AHCA East Second Team All-American	2024	
All-Hockey East First Team	2025	
AHCA East Second Team All-American	2025	
International
World Junior Championship Media All-Star team	2025	

Awards and achievements
Preceded by Brennan Othmann	New York Rangers first-round draft pick 2023	Succeeded by E. J. Emery
