= Will Smith (ice hockey) =

American ice hockey player (born 2005)

- Smith with the San Jose Sharks in 2026
- Born: March 17, 2005 (age 21) Lexington, Massachusetts, U.S.
- Height: 6 ft 0 in (183 cm)
- Weight: 180 lb (82 kg; 12 st 12 lb)
- Position: Forward
- Shoots: Right
- NHL team: San Jose Sharks
- National team: United States
- NHL draft: 4th overall, 2023; San Jose Sharks
- Playing career: 2024–present

William Charles Patrick Smith (born March 17, 2005) is an American professional ice hockey player who is a forward for the San Jose Sharks of the National Hockey League (NHL). Smith was selected fourth overall by the Sharks in the 2023 NHL entry draft. He then played one season of college ice hockey at Boston College before making his NHL debut in the 2024–25 season.

== Early life ==
Smith was born on March 17, 2005, to Bill and Colleen Smith in Lexington, Massachusetts. He has one older sister, Grace, who also attended Boston College. Through his mother, Smith is the great-great-grandson of Charles Comiskey, the founding owner of the Chicago White Sox of Major League Baseball. He played in a variety of sports growing up, and according to his mother, ended his Little League career with a walk-off grand slam.

Smith was a student at Lexington Public Schools before attending the Fessenden School and then Saint Sebastian's School. He became the 14th member of his family to enroll at Boston College, where he is a communication studies major and continues to take online and summer courses toward completing his degree.

== Playing career ==
=== Early years ===
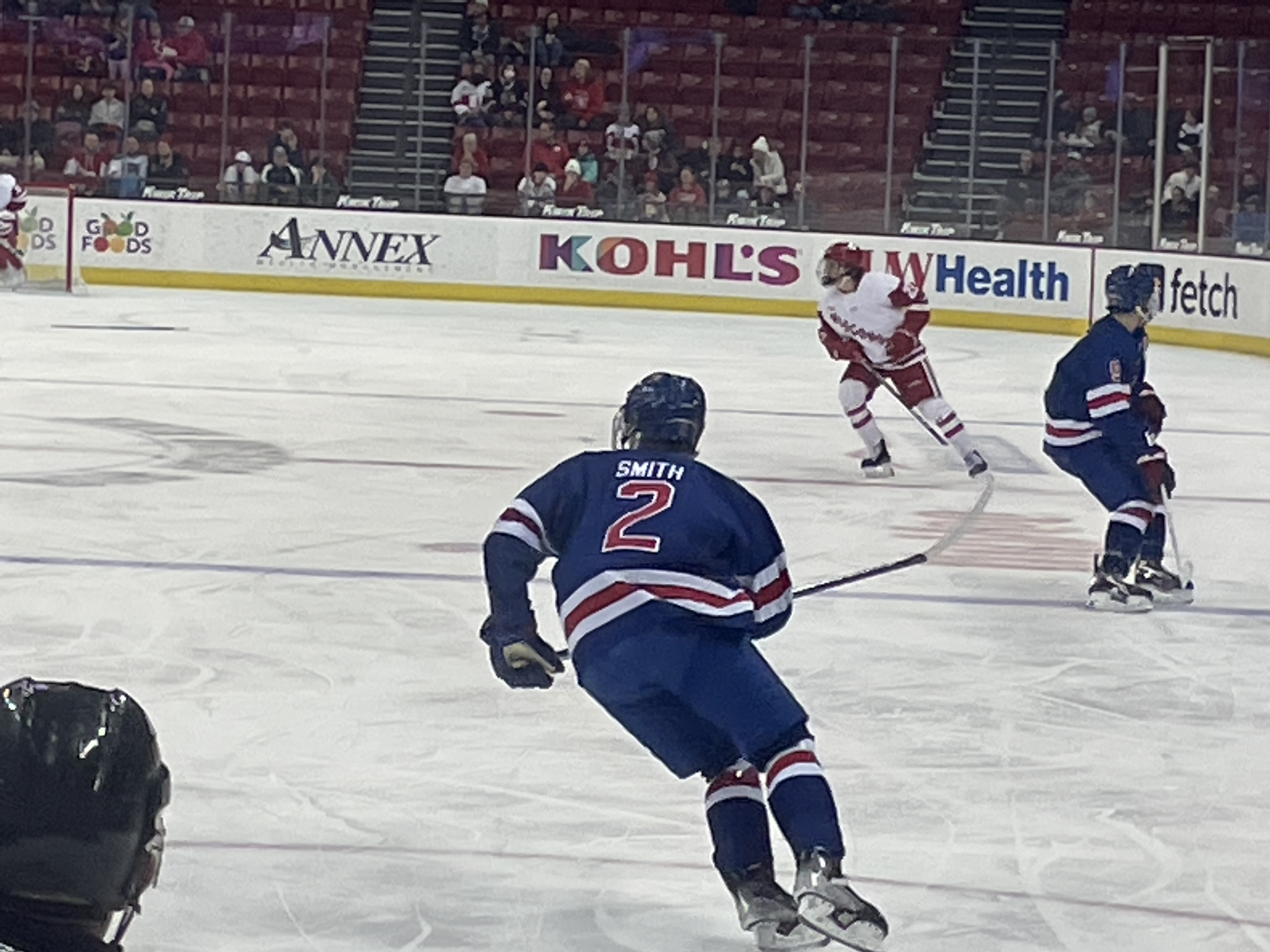
Smith playing for the USA Hockey National Team Development Program in a January 2023 exhibition game against the Wisconsin Badgers

Smith began skating at four years old. He played nine seasons of youth hockey with the Boston Jr. Eagles before joining the USA Hockey National Team Development Program (NTDP) at sixteen years old for the 2021–22 season. Rather than living with a billet family, the Smiths bought a house in Plymouth, Michigan, where Smith lived alongside childhood friends and NTDP teammates Ryan Leonard and Will Vote. Smith, Leonard, and Vote's mothers' all alternated stays at the house to look after the boys.

In Smith's first year in the program he scored 37 points in 35 games with the National U17 team, 28 points in 36 games for the USNTDP Juniors in the United States Hockey League (USHL), and 27 points in 28 games with the U18 team. In his first draft-eligible year and his second year in the program during the 2022–23 season, Smith scored 42 points in 20 games for the USNTDP Juniors in the USHL, and centered the National U18 team's first line. He finished the season ranked second, only behind linemate Gabe Perreault, scoring 127 points (51 goals, 76 assists) in 60 games. Smith completed his USNTDP career with the second-highest single-season point record and the second-highest all-time points record with 191 points over two seasons behind Jack Hughes. He was named MVP of the BioSteel All-American Game.

=== College ===
In the 2023 NHL entry draft, the San Jose Sharks selected him in the first round, fourth overall, the highest draft pick in Boston College history.

Going into the 2023–24 season, Smith committed to playing college ice hockey for the Boston College Eagles, continuing to play with NTDP linemates Ryan Leonard and Gabe Perreault. As a freshman, through the NCAA regular and post-season, Smith led the nation in both points and assists, with 71 points and 46 assists in 41 games. He set a Boston College freshman record for points and assists, and scored the most points in a season by an Eagle of any age since Johnny Gaudreau during the 2013–14 season. Smith was named a CCM/AHCA First Team All-American, to the Hockey East First All-Star Team and All-Rookie Team, and was a runner-up for Hockey East Rookie of the Year. Smith was also a top-10 finalist for the 2024 Hobey Baker Award, alongside Leonard and future San Jose Sharks teammate Macklin Celebrini, who would win the award. Smith recorded four goals and one assist to help Boston College win its 12th Hockey East tournament championship against cross-town rival Boston University, and scored two goals in a 4–0 win over the University of Michigan in the Frozen Four that sent Boston College to the national championship game, where it lost to the University of Denver. For his performance, he was named Hockey East Tournament MVP and to the NCAA Championship All-Tournament Team.

=== Professional ===
On April 13, 2024, Smith was named the Sharks Prospect of the Year for the 2023–24 season by Sharks' management and staff. On May 28, Smith announced that he would not be returning to Boston College, and instead signed his entry-level contract with the San Jose Sharks to start in the 2024–25 season.

Smith was named to the opening night roster and played his first NHL game on October 10, 2024, in a 5–4 overtime loss to the St. Louis Blues. Smith went pointless through his first eight NHL games before scoring his first NHL goal in what became a two-goal game for him, resulting in a 3–2 win against the Chicago Blackhawks on October 31. The multi-goal game made him, at the time, the youngest U.S.-born player to score multiple goals in a game since Cole Sillinger in 2022, and the youngest player in Sharks history to do so since Patrick Marleau in 1999. Smith had a rough first half of his rookie season, registering only 15 points in his first 40 games, but after a "homecoming" game in Boston against the Bruins on January 20, he had an explosive second half, registering 30 points in his final 34 games. He finished his rookie season with 45 points (18 goals, 27 assists) in 74 games, enough to rank third in goals and fourth in both points and assists on the Sharks, fourth in overall NHL rookie scoring, and earn sixth place in Calder Memorial Trophy voting. Smith also finished the season first among all rookies in 5-on-5 primary assists per 60 minutes, ranking 16th overall in the NHL. In July 2025, Smith joined his teammate, Macklin Celebrini, in Halifax for a week of training with stars Sidney Crosby and Nathan MacKinnon.

Though drafted as a center, Smith started the 2025–26 season planning to play mostly on the wing. He began the season on a scoring pace well above his rookie output, recording 12 goals and 29 points through his first 33 games. He was hit during an away game against the Pittsburgh Penguins on December 13, 2025, and sustained an upper-body injury affecting his right shoulder. Smith remained out on injured reserve for 13 games, returning to the lineup on January 16, 2026. By mid-February, he had recorded 39 points (17 goals, 22 assists) in 42 games, capping the stretch before the 2026 Winter Olympics break with six points (three goals, three assists) over a five-game road trip. Smith and Celebrini became the second-highest-scoring under-21 teammate duo in NHL history, factoring into 55 goals together before Smith turned 21 on March 17, ranking only behind Patrick Kane and Jonathan Toews, who factored into 64. On April 7, during a game against the Chicago Blackhawks, Smith earned his 100th NHL point with a third-period goal, assisted by Collin Graf and Macklin Celebrini. Smith finished his sophomore season ranked second on the Sharks in both points and goals with 59 points and 24 goals in 69 games. While still officially registered as a center on the team's depth chart, Smith's prolonged and successful employment on the wing solidified his role as a right-winger for the Sharks, and he is expected to primarily play that position for the foreseeable future.

On October 1, 2026, in the Sharks' 2026–27 season opener against the Florida Panthers, Smith registered two goals and one assist, and became the youngest Sharks player to score multiple goals in a season opener.

== International play ==
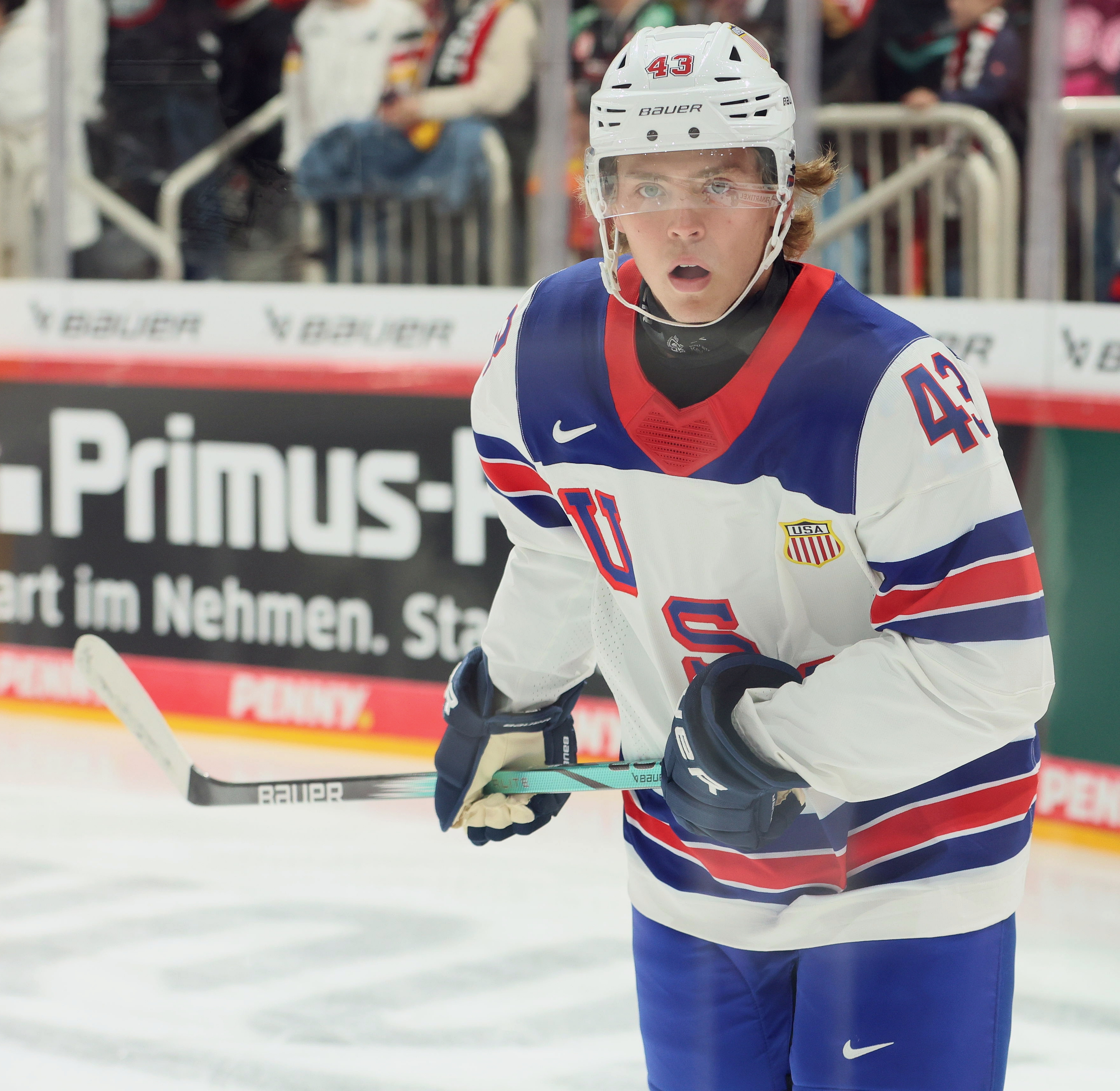
- Smith playing for the United States in an exhibition match before the 2025 World Championship

Medal record

Men's ice hockey

Representing the United States

World Championships
| Gold medal – first place | 2025 Sweden/Denmark | |

World Junior Championships
| Gold medal – first place | 2024 Sweden | |

World U18 Championships
| Gold medal – first place | 2023 Switzerland | |
| Silver medal – second place | 2022 Germany | |

Smith was named to the United States team for the 2022 World U18 Championships, recording four points in four games, and taking home a silver medal.

The following year, at the 2023 World U18 Championships, Smith was named tournament MVP, led all players in scoring with nine goals and 20 points in seven games, and won a gold medal with the United States. He was also named to the Media All-Star team, and received the IIHF Directorate Award for best forward and the Bob Johnson Award for the 2022–23 season.

During his freshman year at Boston College, in December 2023, Smith was named to the United States junior team to compete at the 2024 World Junior Championships. He recorded four points in seven games, and won a gold medal with the United States.

At the end of his freshman year, Smith made his United States senior team debut as a last-minute roster addition to compete at the 2024 World Championship. He played in five games, playing a limited depth role, and failed to record a point. The U.S. team finished fifth place overall.

The following year, after his first season in the NHL, Smith was once again named to the United States team to compete at the 2025 World Championship. He recorded seven assists in 10 games, and helped the United States win their first gold medal since 1933.

== Personal life ==
Smith lived with former San Jose Sharks captain Patrick Marleau and his family for his first two seasons in the NHL. As of August 2026 he lives with teammate and close friend Macklin Celebrini.

Smith signed as Red Bull's first-ever American NHL player as a rookie under their two-year athlete sponsorship contract, which ended in 2026. Since June 2025, he has been an exclusive brand ambassador for Bauer Hockey, serving as a featured athlete in their marketing and digital communication campaigns. In May 2026, Smith became a brand partner with Ford and featured in promotional campaigns for the Ford Bronco.

Smith has a hockey stick collection including sticks from Alexander Ovechkin, Auston Matthews, and the late Johnny Gaudreau.

Smith wears No. 2 in tribute to Hall-of-Famer, Brian Leetch, who played for a year at Boston College, and was a classmate of his father, Bill Smith. He has named fellow American Patrick Kane as his favorite hockey player.

== Career statistics ==
=== Regular season and playoffs ===
| | | | Regular season | | | | | Playoffs |
| Season | Team | League | GP | G | A | Pts | PIM | GP | G | A | Pts | PIM |
|---|---|---|---|---|---|---|---|---|---|---|---|---|
| 2021–22 | U.S. National U17 Team | NTDP | 35 | 17 | 20 | 37 | 8 | — | — | — | — | — |
| 2021–22 | USNTDP Juniors | USHL | 36 | 14 | 14 | 28 | 28 | — | — | — | — | — |
| 2021–22 | U.S. National U18 Team | NTDP | 28 | 14 | 13 | 27 | 20 | — | — | — | — | — |
| 2022–23 | U.S. National U18 Team | NTDP | 60 | 51 | 76 | 127 | 28 | — | — | — | — | — |
| 2022–23 | USNTDP Juniors | USHL | 20 | 15 | 27 | 42 | 18 | — | — | — | — | — |
| 2023–24 | Boston College | NCAA-HE | 41 | 25 | 46 | 71 | 14 | — | — | — | — | — |
| 2024–25 | San Jose Sharks | NHL | 74 | 18 | 27 | 45 | 18 | — | — | — | — | — |
| 2025–26 | San Jose Sharks | NHL | 69 | 24 | 35 | 59 | 16 | — | — | — | — | — |
| NHL totals | | | 143 | 42 | 62 | 104 | 34 | — | — | — | — | — |

=== International ===
| Year | Team | Event | Result | GP | G | A | Pts | PIM |
|---|---|---|---|---|---|---|---|---|
| 2022 | United States | U18 | 2nd place, silver medalist(s) | 4 | 2 | 2 | 4 | 0 |
| 2023 | United States | U18 | 1st place, gold medalist(s) | 7 | 9 | 11 | 20 | 2 |
| 2024 | United States | WJC | 1st place, gold medalist(s) | 7 | 4 | 5 | 9 | 0 |
| 2024 | United States | WC | 5th | 5 | 0 | 0 | 0 | 0 |
| 2025 | United States | WC | 1st place, gold medalist(s) | 10 | 0 | 7 | 7 | 0 |
| Junior totals | | | | 18 | 15 | 18 | 33 | 2 |
| Senior totals | | | | 15 | 0 | 7 | 7 | 0 |

== Awards and honors ==
| Award | Year | Ref |
College
| All-Hockey East First Team | 2024 | |
| Hockey East All-Rookie Team | 2024 | |
| William Flynn Tournament Most Valuable Player | 2024 | |
| AHCA East First Team All-American | 2024 | |
| NCAA All-Tournament Team | 2024 | |
International
| World U18 Championship Best Forward | 2023 | |
| World U18 Championship All-Star Team | 2023 | |
| World U18 Championship MVP | 2023 | |

Awards and achievements
| Preceded by Filip Bystedt | San Jose Sharks first-round draft pick 2023 | Succeeded by Quentin Musty |
| Preceded by Lane Hutson | Hockey East Tournament MVP; 2024 | Succeeded by Albin Boija |
| Preceded by Adam Fantilli | NCAA Ice Hockey Scoring Champion; 2023–24 | Succeeded by Jack Devine |
