= 2022 World U-17 Hockey Challenge =

Tournament details
- Host country: Canada
- Venue(s): 2 (in 2 host cities)
- Dates: November 3–12, 2022
- Teams: 7

Final positions
- Champions: United States
- Runners-up: Canada Red
- Third place: Finland
- Fourth place: Canada Black

Tournament statistics
- Games played: 23
- Goals scored: 193 (8.39 per game)
- Scoring leader(s): (United States) James Hagens (21 points)

The 2022 World Under-17 Hockey Challenge was an ice hockey tournament that was held in Langley and Delta, British Columbia, Canada from November 3 to 12, 2022. It was the 29th edition of the tournament and first since 2019.

== Venues ==
On May 11, 2022, Hockey Canada announced Langley and Delta, British Columbia as the tournament hosts.

Langley	2022 World U-17 Hockey Challenge is located in Canada	Delta
Langley Events Centre Capacity: 5,276	2022 World U-17 Hockey Challenge is located in Canada	Sungod Arena Capacity: 1,900

== Preliminary round ==
All listed times are local (UTC-8).

Pos	Team	Pld	W	OTW	OTL	L	GF	GA	GD	Pts	Qualification
1	United States	6	6	0	0	0	39	12	+27	18	Gold Medal Game
2	Canada Red (H)	6	3	1	0	2	26	20	+6	11	Gold Medal Game
3	Canada Black (H)	6	3	0	1	2	21	26	−5	10	Bronze Medal Game
4	Finland	6	3	0	0	3	24	26	−2	9	Bronze Medal Game
5	Sweden	6	2	1	0	3	21	29	−8	8	
6	Canada White (H)	6	1	1	1	3	24	27	−3	6	
7	Czechia	6	0	0	1	5	16	31	−15	1	

Source: Hockey Canada
(H) Host

November 3, 2022; 14:00	Finland	3–5 (0–2, 3–0, 0–3)	United States	Langley Events Centre, Langley

Game reference
Petteri Rimpinen	Goalies	Nicholas Kempf
4 min	Penalties	8 min
36	Shots	25

November 3, 2022; 19:00	Sweden	3–2 (0–1, 1–0, 2–1)	Canada White	Sungod Arena, Delta

Game reference
Hugo Laring	Goalies	David Egorov
8 min	Penalties	8 min
36	Shots	27

November 3, 2022; 19:00	Canada Red	3–4 (0–1, 3–1, 0–2)	Canada Black	Langley Events Centre, Langley

Game reference
Gabriel D’Aigle	Goalies	Louka Cloutier
4 min	Penalties	8 min
43	Shots	23

November 4, 2022; 19:00	United States	7–1 (2–0, 1–0, 4–1)	Czechia	Sungod Arena, Delta

Game reference
Jack Parsons	Goalies	Jakub Milota
8 min	Penalties	8 min
52	Shots	21

November 4, 2022; 19:00	Canada Black	1–5 (0–1, 1–2, 0–2)	Finland	Langley Events Centre, Langley

Game reference
Ryerson Leenders	Goalies	Petteri Rimpinen
6 min	Penalties	6 min
35	Shots	38

November 5, 2022; 14:00	Canada Red	3–0 (1–0, 2–0, 0–0)	Czechia	Langley Events Centre, Langley

Game reference
Chase Wutzke	Goalies	Adam Ebenstreit
10 min	Penalties	10 min
30	Shots	24

November 5, 2022; 19:00	Sweden	3–8 (2–2, 0–4, 1–2)	United States	Sungod Arena, Delta

Game reference
Axel Nyman	Goalies	Nicholas Kempf
8 min	Penalties	8 min
25	Shots	53

November 5, 2022; 19:00	Canada White	3–5 (2–3, 0–1, 1–1)	Canada Black	Langley Events Centre, Langley

Game reference
Madden Mulawka	Goalies	Louka Cloutier
4 min	Penalties	6 min
41	Shots	35

November 6, 2022; 19:00	Canada White	3–4 OT (0–1, 1–2, 2–0) (OT: 0–1)	Canada Red	Langley Events Centre, Langley

Game reference
David Egorov	Goalies	Gabriel D’Aigle
6 min	Penalties	14 min
51	Shots	28

November 7, 2022; 12:00	Canada Black	3–4 OT (0–0, 3–2, 0–1) (OT: 0–1)	Sweden	Langley Events Centre, Langley

Game reference
Louka Cloutier	Goalies	Hugo Laring
4 min	Penalties	4 min
36	Shots	41

November 7, 2022; 19:00	Czechia	1–3 (0–1, 1–2, 0–0)	Finland	Sungod Arena, Delta

Game reference
Jakub Milota	Goalies	Kim Saarinen
10 min	Penalties	14 min
31	Shots	33

November 7, 2022; 19:00	United States	5–2 (2–0, 1–0, 2–2)	Canada Red	Langley Events Centre, Langley

Game reference
Jack Parsons	Goalies	Chase Wutzke
10 min	Penalties	8 min
30	Shots	27

November 8, 2022; 12:00	Sweden	3–6 (1–3, 1–2, 1–1)	Finland	Langley Events Centre, Langley

Game reference
Hugo Laring	Goalies	Petteri Rimpinen
12 min	Penalties	8 min
29	Shots	39

November 8, 2022; 19:00	Canada Black	1–6 (0–2, 0–2, 1–2)	United States	Sungod Arena, Delta

Game reference
Ryerson Leenders	Goalies	Nicholas Kempf
14 min	Penalties	12 min
23	Shots	31

November 8, 2022; 19:00	Canada White	6–5 OT (4–2, 1–2, 0–1) (OT: 1–0)	Czechia	Langley Events Centre, Langley

Game reference
Madden Mulawka; David Egorov	Goalies	Adam Ebenstreit; Jakub Milota
10 min	Penalties	12 min
28	Shots	26

November 9, 2022; 19:00	Finland	5–8 (1–2, 2–5, 2–1)	Canada Red	Sungod Arena, Delta

Game reference
Petteri Rimpinen	Goalies	Gabriel D’Aigle
4 min	Penalties	6 min
30	Shots	36

November 9, 2022; 19:00	Czechia	4–5 (1–2, 3–1, 0–2)	Sweden	Langley Events Centre, Langley

Game reference
Jakub Milota	Goalies	Hugo Laring
8 min	Penalties	8 min
33	Shots	31

November 10, 2022; 19:00	United States	8–2 (3–0, 3–1, 2–1)	Canada White	Langley Events Centre, Langley

Game reference
Jack Parsons	Goalies	David Egorov
30 min	Penalties	26 min
44	Shots	22

November 11, 2022; 14:00	Czechia	5–7 (0–1, 2–3, 3–3)	Canada Black	Langley Events Centre, Langley

Game reference
Adam Ebenstreit	Goalies	Louka Cloutier
14 min	Penalties	6 min
22	Shots	33

November 11, 2022; 19:00	Canada Red	6–3 (2–2, 2–1, 2–0)	Sweden	Sungod Arena, Delta

Game reference
Gabriel D’Aigle	Goalies	Hugo Laring
6 min	Penalties	4 min
38	Shots	38

November 11, 2022; 19:00	Finland	2–8 (0–3, 1–4, 1–1)	Canada White	Langley Events Centre, Langley

Game reference
Petteri Rimpinen; Kim Saarinen	Goalies	David Egorov
33 min	Penalties	22 min
35	Shots	28

== Playoff round ==
=== Bronze-medal game ===
November 12, 2022; 12:00	Finland	7–1 (3–0, 3–1, 1–0)	Canada Black	Langley Events Centre, Langley

Game reference
Petteri Rimpinen	Goalies	Ryerson Leenders; Louka Cloutier
6 min	Penalties	6 min
35	Shots	17

=== Gold-medal game ===
November 12, 2022; 17:00	Canada Red	3–11 (0–3, 2–3, 1–5)	United States	Langley Events Centre, Langley

Game reference
Gabriel D’Aigle; Chase Wutzke	Goalies	Nicholas Kempf
12 min	Penalties	8 min
36	Shots	42

== Statistics ==
=== Scoring leaders ===
Pos	Player	Country	GP	G	A	Pts	PIM
1	James Hagens	United States	7	8	13	21	8
2	Cole Eiserman	United States	7	12	8	20	4
3	Porter Martone	Canada Red	7	7	5	12	6
4	Berkly Catton	Canada Red	7	3	9	12	0
5	Konsta Helenius	Finland	7	2	9	11	4
6	Roope Vesterinen	Finland	7	7	3	10	4
7	Max Plante	United States	7	0	10	10	0
8	Cole Hutson	United States	7	0	9	9	4
9	Christian Humphreys	United States	7	5	3	8	2
10	Roger McQueen	Canada White	6	4	4	8	6

GP = Games played; G = Goals; A = Assists; Pts = Points; PIM = Penalties In Minutes
Source: Hockey Canada

=== Goaltending leaders ===
(minimum 40% team's total ice time)

Pos	Player	Country	TOI	GA	GAA	SA	Sv%	SO
1	Jack Parsons	United States	180:00	5	1.67	70	.929	0
2	Nicholas Kempf	United States	240:00	10	2.50	120	.917	0
3	David Egorov	Canada White	269:00	18	4.01	156	.885	0
4	Hugo Laring	Sweden	300:00	20	4.00	172	.884	0
5	Louka Cloutier	Canada Black	250:00	18	4.32	153	.882	0

TOI = Time on ice (minutes:seconds); GA = Goals against; GAA = Goals against average; SA = Shots against; Sv% = Save percentage; SO = Shutouts
Source: Hockey Canada

=== Final standings ===
Pos	Team	Pld	W	OTW	OTL	L	GF	GA	GD	Pts	Final Result
1	United States	7	7	0	0	0	50	15	+35	21	Champions
2	Canada Red (H)	7	3	1	0	3	29	31	−2	11	Runners-up
3	Finland	7	4	0	0	3	31	27	+4	12	Third Place
4	Canada Black (H)	7	3	0	1	3	22	33	−11	10	Fourth Place
5	Sweden	6	2	1	0	3	21	29	−8	8	Eliminated in Preliminary round
6	Canada White (H)	6	1	1	1	3	24	27	−3	6	Eliminated in Preliminary round
7	Czechia	6	0	0	1	5	16	31	−15	1	Eliminated in Preliminary round

Source: Hockey Canada
(H) Host

=== Awards ===
- Tournament All-Star Team:
  - Goaltender: (Canada) -R Gabriel D’Aigle
  - Defencemen: (Canada) -B Sam Dickinson / (Canada) -W Henry Mews
  - Forwards: (Canada) -R Berkly Catton / (United States) Cole Eiserman / (United States) James Hagens

Source: Hockey Canada
