= Carson Bjarnason =

Canadian ice hockey player (born 2005)

- Born: June 30, 2005 (age 21) Brandon, Manitoba, Canada
- Height: 6 ft 3 in (191 cm)
- Weight: 186 lb (84 kg; 13 st 4 lb)
- Position: Goaltender
- Catches: Left
- NHL team (P) Cur. team: Philadelphia Flyers; Lehigh Valley Phantoms (AHL)
- NHL draft: 51st overall, 2023; Philadelphia Flyers
- Playing career: 2025–present

Carson Bjarnason (born June 30, 2005) is a Canadian professional ice hockey goaltender for the Lehigh Valley Phantoms of the American Hockey League (AHL) as a prospect to the Philadelphia Flyers of the National Hockey League (NHL). The Flyers selected him in the second round, 51st overall, of the 2023 NHL entry draft.

== Early life ==
Bjarnason was born June 30, 2005, in Brandon, Manitoba, and he was raised in nearby Carberry. He did not begin playing ice hockey until the age of nine, when he joined Carberry's minor ice hockey program. From there, he played with the Southwest Cougars of the Manitoba U-18 'AAA' Hockey League, and with the RINK Hockey Academy. He had a 10–7–2 record with a .913 save percentage (SV%) in his final season with the Cougars, as well as a .914 SV% and 2.01 goals against average (GAA) in two starts for RINK.

== Playing career ==
=== Junior ===
Although Bjarnason was not selected by any Western Hockey League (WHL) team in their bantam draft, he joined the Brandon Wheat Kings for the 2021–22 season to begin his junior ice hockey career. After a successful training camp, Bjarnason opened the season as the backup goaltender to Ethan Kruger. His first WHL win came on October 10, in a 4–2 victory over the Regina Pats. Bjarnason struggled in his first eight games, with a 4.69 GAA and .866 SV%, in large part due to injuries to Kruger and other Wheat Kings leaving him unprepared. He finished his rookie season with a 4.00 GAA and .882 SV% in 23 games. Many of those appearances came early in the season, when the Wheat Kings had so many injured players that they struggled to dress 18 skaters per game.

With Kruger out of junior hockey, Bjarnason returned to the Wheat Kings as their starting goaltender for the 2022–23 season. He recorded his first career shutout on October 21, stopping all 29 shots he faced against the Kelowna Rockets. In January, he participated in the CHL/NHL Top Prospects Game, stopping 16 of 17 shots he faced for Team Red. The jump to a full-time workload took a toll on Bjarnason's health, as he had only played 44 games the last three seasons combined. He missed a stretch of games between February 15 and March 10 with a hip flexor overuse injury. In 47 appearances, Bjarnason had a 21–19–5–1 record with a 3.08 GAA and .900 SV%, his performance diminishing due to injuries towards the end of the season. He received several end-of-season team awards, including Wheat Kings MVP.

Bjarnason once again served as Brandon's starting goaltender for the 2023–24 season. He missed a month of the season with a nagging injury, ultimately putting up a 24–17–4–1 record, 3.01 GAA, and .907 SV% in 46 appearances. At the end of the season, he was named to the WHL East Division Second All-Star Team.

In his final season of junior ice hockey play, Bjarnason shifted from the full-time starting goalie to sharing a tandem with Ethan Eskit, who had been his backup the previous year. Although he was hindered by a meniscus injury in the latter half of the season, Bjarnason put up a 22–15–3–0 record, 2.93 GAA, and .913 SV% in 40 games. He was also a nominee for the Del Wilson Trophy, awarded to the top WHL goaltender of the year.

=== Professional ===
The Philadelphia Flyers of the National Hockey League (NHL) selected Bjarnason in the second round, with the 51st overall pick, of the 2023 NHL entry draft. He signed a three-year, entry-level contract with the team that September.

Bjarnason began his professional hockey career with the Lehigh Valley Phantoms, the Flyers' American Hockey League (AHL) affiliate. When the NHL was on break in February for the 2026 Winter Olympics, Bjarnason was recalled to practice with the NHL squad. At the time, he was 11–7–3 with an .889 SV% and 3.08 GAA. In April, he played two games with the Reading Royals of the ECHL, going 1–1–0 with a .881 SV% and 3.57 GAA in that time. Serving as the youngest goaltender during the 2025–26 AHL season, Bjarnason went 11–14–4 in his rookie season, with a .877 SV% and 3.43 GAA in the process.

== International play ==
Medal record

Ice hockey

Representing Canada

World U18 Championships
Bronze medal – third place	2023 Switzerland	

Hlinka Gretzky Cup
Gold medal – first place	2022 Canada	

Bjarnason first represented the Canada men's national under-18 ice hockey team at the 2022 Hlinka Gretzky Cup in Red Deer, Alberta. He appeared in one tournament game, stopping 20 shots in a 9–1 win over Slovakia en route to a gold medal win. The next year, he returned to the under-18 national team for the 2023 IIHF World U18 Championships in Switzerland. He went 4–2–0 with a 3.51 GAA and .849 SV% in six tournament appearances, capturing a bronze medal in the process.

Bjarnason was named to the Canada men's national junior ice hockey team for the 2025 World Junior Ice Hockey Championships in Canada, although he did not appear in a game.

== Personal life ==
Bjarnason is of Red River Métis and Icelandic descent on his father's side.

== Career statistics ==
=== Regular season and playoffs ===
			Regular season									Playoffs
Season	Team	League	GP	W	L	OTL	MIN	GA	SO	GAA	SV%	GP	W	L	MIN	GA	SO	GAA	SV%
2021–22	Brandon Wheat Kings	WHL	23	8	10	1	1,139	76	0	4.00	.882	—	—	—	—	—	—	—	—
2022–23	Brandon Wheat Kings	WHL	47	21	19	6	2,725	140	3	3.08	.900	—	—	—	—	—	—	—	—
2023–24	Brandon Wheat Kings	WHL	46	24	17	5	2,670	134	2	3.01	.907	4	0	4	176	21	0	7.15	.831
2024–25	Brandon Wheat Kings	WHL	40	22	15	3	2,335	114	1	2.93	.913	3	0	3	172	12	0	4.19	.870
2025–26	Lehigh Valley Phantoms	AHL	32	14	11	4	1,801	103	0	3.43	.877	—	—	—	—	—	—	—	—
2025–26	Reading Royals	ECHL	2	1	1	0	118	7	0	3.57	.881	—	—	—	—	—	—	—	—
AHL totals			32	14	11	4	1,801	103	0	3.43	.877	—	—	—	—	—	—	—	—

=== International ===
Year	Team	Event	Result	GP	W	L	MIN	GA	SO	GAA	SV%
2022	Canada	HG18	1st place, gold medalist(s)	1	1	0	60	1	0	1.00	.950
2023	Canada	U18	3rd place, bronze medalist(s)	6	4	1	273	16	1	3.52	.849
Junior totals				7	5	1	333	17	1	2.43	.865

== Awards and honours ==
Award	Year	Ref.
WHL
CHL/NHL Top Prospects Game	2023	
East Division Second All-Star Team	2024	
