= Carey Terrance =

American-Canadian ice hockey player (born 2005)

- Born: May 10, 2005 (age 21) Akwesasne, New York, United States
- Height: 6 ft 0 in (183 cm)
- Weight: 203 lb (92 kg; 14 st 7 lb)
- Position: Center
- Shoots: Left
- NHL team (P) Cur. team: New York Rangers; Hartford Wolf Pack (AHL)
- NHL draft: 59th overall, 2023; Anaheim Ducks
- Playing career: 2025–present

Carey Terrance is an American-Canadian ice hockey center for the Hartford Wolf Pack in the American Hockey League (AHL) as a prospect to the New York Rangers of the National Hockey League (NHL). Terrance was drafted by the Anaheim Ducks in the 2nd round of the 2023 NHL entry draft with the 59th overall pick.

== Playing career ==
Terrance started his junior hockey career with the Erie Otters of the Ontario Hockey League in the 2021–22 OHL season, where scored 10 goals and had 14 assists in 62 games. The following season saw he increase his scoring to 30 goals and 17 assists in 67 games. In the 2023–24 OHL season, he scored 29 goals with 23 assists. He was named the Otters' captain for the 2024–25 season, in which he scored 20 goals with 19 assists in 45 games. He missed the last 2 months of the season after a serious injury he suffered crashing into the boards.

Terrance was drafted 59th overall by the Ducks in the 2nd round of the 2023 draft. He signed an entry-level contract with the Ducks in April 2025. In June 2025, Terrance was traded to the New York Rangers along with a 2025 third-round pick in exchange for Chris Kreider and a 2025 fourth-round pick.

He began the 2025-26 season with the Rangers' AHL affiliate the Hartford Wolf Pack and scored his first professional goal for the Wolf Pack on October 23, 2025 against the Springfield Thunderbirds. He played primarily in a defensive role for the Wolf Pack in 2025-26, including playing as one of the teams main penalty killers, but had limited success offensively through most of the season. He only had 3 goals and 3 assists through Hartford's first 50 games, but scored 5 goals and 6 assists in his final 18 games to finish the season with 8 goals and 9 assists in 68 games.

== International play ==
Medal record

Representing United States

Ice hockey

World Junior Championships
Gold medal – first place	2024 Sweden	
Gold medal – first place	2025 Canada	

World U18 Championships
Gold medal – first place	2023 Switzerland	

Terrance was selected to represent the United States in the 2023 IIHF World U18 Championships, where he won a gold medal. He also represented the United States in the 2023 Hlinka Gretzky Cup, where the team finished in 3rd place.

He was selected to the United States men's national junior ice hockey team for the 2024 World Junior Ice Hockey Championships, where he won another gold medal although he did not play in any games. He was also selected to United States team for the 2025 World Junior Ice Hockey Championships, where he won another gold medal and in which he scored 2 goals in 7 games. Terrance served primarily as a checking forward and penalty killer during the tournament. He felt that despite not playing the previous year, that experience helped him coming into the 2025 tournament. He said of the experience of winning a second gold medal:

It’s an awesome feeling. I got a chance to go home for a few days after the tournament and just kind of take it all in. It was a really special three weeks, and I’m happy that the team got it done. Obviously, it was a crazy tournament, and there’s even more hype around the tournament when it’s in North America and especially when it’s in Canada, so it’s very special to win in Canada and win two gold medals in a row for the first time.

== Playing style ==
Terrance's primary assets are his speed and skating ability. He has also been praised for his willingness to compete for loose pucks and take hits to make plays. Prior to the trade with the Rangers, Ducks' director of player development Jim Johnson praised Terrance's speed and energy and noted that his "defensive game has matured" but he needs to develop more "offensive consistency and physical strength". Johnson also praised the way Terrance uses his speed to forecheck the opposition.

Terrance said of his play during the 2024–25 season with Erie "I think my defensive game has developed and it's very consistent every game. But I just think I haven't really got things clicking consistently offensively. Had kind of a slow start, kind of picked it up, but just want to find that more offensive consistency in my game." During the 2025-26 season he acknowledged that his goal is to be a 4th line player in the NHL, recognizing that his skills are primarily defensive. He stated "I think that’s the way that I’m going to get my foot in the door. When I was at the World Juniors (with Team USA), I was kind of in the same position. Put out on the ice to be kind of a shutdown guy and play PK, and be relied on. Coming into this year, I think I understood that’s the role I was going to be put in, and I can excel in that role."

Before the 2025-26 season, Vincent Z. Mercogliano and Peter Baugh of The Athletic rated Terrance as the Rangers' 8th best prospect. In March 2026 Scott Wheeler of The Athletic rated Terrance as the Rangers' 15th best prospect. Wheeler praised his skating speed, his effotrt, his defense and his penalty killing but expressed concern about his hands and offensive skill, concluding that "the development of his playmaking into a more consistent element could be the difference between an AHL career and any chance of becoming a call-up option/fourth-liner who adds the desired speed to a line."

== Personal life ==
Terrance is a member of the Saint Regis Mohawk Tribe and was born in Akwesasne, New York. He became the 9th player of Mohawk descent to be drafted into the NHL. He received an award from the Mohawk Council of Akwesasne in recognition of his international achievements and representation of their community.

He is a 2026 inductee in the North American Indigenous Athletics Hall of Fame (NAIAHF).

== Career statistics ==
=== Regular season and playoffs ===
			Regular season					Playoffs
Season	Team	League	GP	G	A	Pts	PIM	GP	G	A	Pts	PIM
2021–22	Erie Otters	OHL	62	10	14	24	20	—	—	—	—	—
2022–23	Erie Otters	OHL	67	30	17	47	22	—	—	—	—	—
2023–24	Erie Otters	OHL	56	29	23	51	25	6	2	2	4	4
2024–25	Erie Otters	OHL	45	20	19	39	14	—	—	—	—	—
2025–26	Hartford Wolf Pack	AHL	68	8	9	17	44	—	—	—	—	—
AHL totals			68	8	9	17	44	—	—	—	—	—

=== International ===
Year	Team	Event	Result	GP	G	A	Pts	PIM
2023	United States	U18	1st place, gold medalist(s)	7	2	4	6	0
2024	United States	WJC	1st place, gold medalist(s)	0	0	0	0	0
2025	United States	WJC	1st place, gold medalist(s)	7	2	0	2	6
Junior totals				14	4	4	8	6
