= Cole Eiserman =

American ice hockey player (born 2006)

- Born: August 29, 2006 (age 20) Newburyport, Massachusetts, U.S.
- Height: 6 ft 0 in (183 cm)
- Weight: 195 lb (88 kg; 13 st 13 lb)
- Position: Left wing
- Shoots: Left
- NHL team (P) Cur. team: New York Islanders; Hamilton Hammers (AHL)
- NHL draft: 20th overall, 2024; New York Islanders
- Playing career: 2026–present

Cole Eiserman (born August 29, 2006) is an American professional ice hockey player who is a left winger for the Hamilton Hammers of the American Hockey League (AHL) while under contract as a prospect to the New York Islanders of the National Hockey League (NHL). He was selected in the first round, 20th overall, by the New York Islanders in the 2024 NHL entry draft.

== Playing career ==
Playing for Shattuck-Saint Mary's in the 2020–21 season, Eiserman scored 97 goals and 57 assists for 154 points in 50 games. Only two players, Sidney Crosby and Jonathan Toews, recorded more goals for Shattuck's under-18 team at 15 years old. Following his time with Shattuck, Eiserman joined the USA Hockey National Team Development Program (USNTDP), where in the 2022–23 season he recorded 69 goals and 104 points.

Entering the 2023–24 season, Eiserman's shooting talent, physical edge, and work ethic led him to be viewed as one of the top prospects eligible for the 2024 NHL entry draft, and a potential challenger to Macklin Celebrini as the first overall selection. Concerns about his game, described as "one dimensional" and "selfish", specifically his lack of defensive ability and reliance on teammates to generate high-danger chances, led to his draft stock slipping from a top two draft prospect to a projected mid-first round pick. Despite the doubts about his game, he had a very successful second term with the NTDP, breaking Cole Caufield's program scoring record with 127 goals in his 119-game NTDP career.

Eiserman originally committed to playing college ice hockey for the University of Minnesota, but changed his commitment in September 2023 to Boston University in order to play closer to home.

Despite being one of the top goal-scorers available in the first round, Eiserman was picked 20th overall by the New York Islanders in the 2024 NHL entry draft.

On March 18, 2026, Eiserman signed a three-year, entry-level contract with the New York Islanders. He also signed an amateur tryout (ATO) contract with New York's American Hockey League (AHL) affiliate, the Bridgeport Islanders (now the Hamilton Hammers).

== International play ==
Medal record

Men's ice hockey

Representing the United States

World Junior Championships
Gold medal – first place	2025 Canada	

World U18 Championships
Gold medal – first place	2023 Switzerland	
Silver medal – second place	2024 Finland	

Eiserman represented the United States at the 2022 World U-17 Hockey Challenge, where his 12 goals and 20 points in seven games ranked first and second, respectively, and helped the team to finish in first place.

Eiserman represented the United States under-18 team at the 2023 World U18 Championships, where he recorded nine goals and two assists in seven games and won a gold medal. He again represented the United States at the 2024 World U18 Championships, where he recorded a hat trick in the first game of the tournament, a 9–0 victory over Slovakia. He finished the event with nine goals and two assists in seven games and won a silver medal.

On December 24 2025, Eiserman was named to the junior team to compete at the 2026 World Junior Championships. During the tournament he recorded two goals and one assist in five games, while the team was eliminated in the quarterfinals by Finland.

== Personal life ==
Eiserman's father, Bill Eiserman, played for UMass Lowell from 1986 to 1987. Eiserman's uncle, Ed Hill, was drafted by the Nashville Predators in 1999. Eiserman has four brothers, including a twin, all of whom play ice hockey at various levels. One of his brothers, Shane Eiserman, was drafted by the Ottawa Senators in the fourth round of the 2014 NHL entry draft.

== Career statistics ==
=== Regular season and playoffs ===
			Regular season					Playoffs
Season	Team	League	GP	G	A	Pts	PIM	GP	G	A	Pts	PIM
2022–23	U.S. National Development Team	USHL	32	28	16	44	18	—	—	—	—	—
2023–24	U.S. National Development Team	USHL	24	25	9	34	6	—	—	—	—	—
2024–25	Boston University	HE	39	25	11	36	27	—	—	—	—	—
2025–26	Boston University	HE	32	18	10	28	14	—	—	—	—	—
2025–26	Bridgeport Islanders	AHL	12	2	7	9	2	2	0	0	0	0
USHL totals			56	53	25	78	24	—	—	—	—	—

=== International ===
Year	Team	Event	Result	GP	G	A	Pts	PIM
2022	United States	U17	1st place, gold medalist(s)	7	12	8	20	4
2023	United States	U18	1st place, gold medalist(s)	7	9	2	11	8
2024	United States	U18	2nd place, silver medalist(s)	7	9	2	11	2
2025	United States	WJC	1st place, gold medalist(s)	7	3	4	7	6
2026	United States	WJC	5th	5	2	1	3	0
Junior totals				33	35	17	52	20

== Awards and honors ==
Award	Year	Ref
College
Hockey East All-Rookie Team	2025	

Awards and achievements
Preceded by Simon Holmström	New York Islanders first round pick 2024	Succeeded by Matthew Schaefer
