= Nicholas Kempf =

American ice hockey goaltender (born 2006)

- Born: March 1, 2006 (age 20) Morton Grove, Illinois, U.S.
- Height: 6 ft 2 in (188 cm)
- Weight: 190 lb (86 kg; 13 st 8 lb)
- Position: Goaltender
- Catches: Left
- NCAA team: University of Notre Dame
- NHL draft: 114th overall, 2024; Washington Capitals

Nicholas Guenter Kempf (born March 1, 2006) is an American college ice hockey player who is a goaltender for the University of Notre Dame. He was drafted in the fourth round, 114th overall, by the Washington Capitals in the 2024 NHL entry draft.

== Playing career ==
Kempf played under-13, under-14, and under-15 Tier I AAA youth hockey with the Chicago Mission. In the 2020–21 season, he played in 21 games including 5 shutouts and a league-leading 1.61 Goals Against Average (GAA). Kempf played in five of the six games for Mission at the 2022 USA Hockey Youth Tier I 15-only National Championship and finished with an impressive .944 Save Percentage (sv%), 1.20 GAA, and one shutout.

Kempf played two seasons with the USA Hockey National Team Development Program. Appearing in 30 games with the under-17 team, he posted a 15-11-0 record, a 4.04 GAA, a .886 sv%, and two shutouts. With the under-18 team, he appeared in 30 games posting a 3.21 GAA, a .894 sv%, a 18-8-0 record, and one shutout. Kempf ranked second among draft-eligible goalies in North America in the 2024 NHL entry draft midterm ranking (January 12, 2024) and fourth in the final NHL Central Scouting ranking (April 16, 2024). As an under-18, he also played at the 2024 USA Hockey All-American Game. He is committed to play college ice hockey for the University of Notre Dame.

Kempf was drafted 114th overall by the Washington Capitals in the 2024 NHL entry draft. He was the tenth goaltender and only American goaltender selected in the draft.

== International play ==
Medal record

Representing United States

Ice hockey

World U18 Championship
| Silver medal – second place | 2024 Finland | |

World U-17 Hockey Challenge
| Gold medal – first place | 2022 Canada | |

Kempf represented the United States at the 2022 World U-17 Hockey Challenge, recording a .917 Save Percentage (sv%) over four games en route to a gold medal, and posted a .919 sv% in six games at the 2024 IIHF World U18 Championships for the silver medal.

On December 24 2025, Kempf was named to the United States men's national junior ice hockey team to compete at the 2026 World Junior Ice Hockey Championships.

== Career statistics ==
=== Regular season and playoffs ===
| | | | Regular season | | | | | | | | | Playoffs |
| Season | Team | League | GP | W | L | T/OT | MIN | GA | SO | GAA | SV% | GP | W | L | MIN | GA | SO | GAA | SV% |
|---|---|---|---|---|---|---|---|---|---|---|---|---|---|---|---|---|---|---|---|
| 2022–23 | U.S. National Development Team | USHL | 18 | 7 | 9 | 0 | 95 | 81 | 1 | 5.10 | .834 | 1 | 0 | 1 | 59 | 4 | 0 | 4.03 | .840 |
| 2023–24 | U.S. National Development Team | USHL | 18 | 10 | 4 | 1 | 943 | 61 | 0 | 3.88 | .870 | — | — | — | — | — | — | — | — |
| 2024–25 | University of Notre Dame | B1G | 13 | 2 | 10 | 1 | 722 | 45 | 0 | 3.74 | .895 | — | — | — | — | — | — | — | — |
| NCAA totals | | | 13 | 2 | 10 | 1 | 722 | 45 | 0 | 3.74 | .895 | — | — | — | — | — | — | — | — |

=== International ===
| Year | Team | Event | Result | GP | W | L | T | MIN | GA | SO | GAA | SV% |
|---|---|---|---|---|---|---|---|---|---|---|---|---|
| 2022 | United States | U17 | 1st place, gold medalist(s) | 4 | 4 | 0 | 0 | 240 | 10 | 0 | 2.50 | .917 |
| 2024 | United States | U18 | 2nd place, silver medalist(s) | 6 | 5 | 1 | 0 | 318 | 10 | 0 | 1.89 | .919 |
| Junior totals | | | | 10 | 9 | 1 | 0 | 558 | 20 | 0 | 2.15 |
