= Noah Dower Nilsson =

Swedish ice hockey player (born 2005)

- Born: 25 April 2005 (age 21) Strömstad, Sweden
- Height: 6 ft 0 in (183 cm)
- Weight: 174 lb (79 kg; 12 st 6 lb)
- Position: Left wing
- Shoots: Left
- NHL team (P) Cur. team Former teams: Detroit Red Wings; Grand Rapids Griffins (AHL); Frölunda HC
- NHL draft: 73rd overall, 2023; Detroit Red Wings
- Playing career: 2022–present

Noah Dower Nilsson (born 25 April 2005) is a Swedish professional ice hockey left wing currently playing with the Grand Rapids Griffins in the American Hockey League (AHL) while under contract as a prospect to the Detroit Red Wings of the National Hockey League (NHL). He was selected 73rd overall by the Red Wings in the 2023 NHL entry draft.

== Playing career ==
Dower Nilsson appeared in 37 games for Frölunda HC in the J20 Nationell, where he recorded 26 goals and 28 assists and led the team in points and goals. He made his professional debut for Frölunda HC during the 2022–23 season where he appeared in three games.

Dower Nilsson was drafted in the third round, 73rd overall, by the Detroit Red Wings in the 2023 NHL entry draft.

He was later signed by the Red Wings to a three-year, entry-level contract on 5 April 2026.

== International play ==
Medal record

Representing Sweden

Ice hockey

World U18 Championships
Silver medal – second place	2023 Switzerland	

Dower Nilsson represented Sweden at the 2023 IIHF World U18 Championships, where he recorded two goals and four assists in seven games, and won a silver medal.

== Personal life ==
Noah's brother, Liam, is a professional ice hockey player and was selected 134th overall by the Red Wings in the 2021 NHL entry draft.

== Career statistics ==
=== Regular season and playoffs ===
			Regular season					Playoffs
Season	Team	League	GP	G	A	Pts	PIM	GP	G	A	Pts	PIM
2021–22	Frölunda HC	J18	7	7	8	15	6	4	3	3	6	2
2021–22	Frölunda HC	J20	12	2	2	4	2	—	—	—	—	—
2022–23	Frölunda HC	J18	3	3	3	6	4	5	1	5	6	20
2022–23	Frölunda HC	J20	37	26	28	54	10	2	0	2	2	0
2022–23	Frölunda HC	SHL	3	0	0	0	0	—	—	—	—	—
2023–24	Frölunda HC	J20	3	3	1	4	2	—	—	—	—	—
2023–24	Frölunda HC	SHL	5	1	1	2	0	—	—	—	—	—
2023–24	IF Björklöven	Allsv	1	0	0	0	0	—	—	—	—	—
2024–25	Frölunda HC	SHL	35	4	6	10	10	7	0	0	0	2
2024–25	Frölunda HC	J20	—	—	—	—	—	1	0	1	1	0
2025–26	Frölunda HC	SHL	48	6	10	16	10	6	2	2	4	2
SHL totals			91	11	17	28	20	13	2	2	4	2

=== International ===
Year	Team	Event	Result	GP	G	A	Pts	PIM
2022	Sweden	HG18	2nd place, silver medalist(s)	5	1	3	4	2
2023	Sweden	U18	2nd place, silver medalist(s)	7	2	4	6	6
Junior totals				12	3	7	10	8
