= Anton Wahlberg =

Swedish ice hockey player (born 2005)

- Born: 4 July 2005 (age 21) Malmö, Sweden
- Height: 6 ft 3 in (191 cm)
- Weight: 194 lb (88 kg; 13 st 12 lb)
- Position: Centre
- Shoots: Left
- NHL team (P) Cur. team Former teams: Anaheim Ducks; San Diego Gulls (AHL); Malmö Redhawks
- NHL draft: 39th overall, 2023; Buffalo Sabres
- Playing career: 2022–present

Anton Wahlberg (born 4 July 2005) is a Swedish ice hockey centre for the San Diego Gulls in the American Hockey League (AHL) while under contract to the Anaheim Ducks of the National Hockey League (NHL). Wahlberg was selected by the Buffalo Sabres in the second round, 39th overall, of the 2023 NHL entry draft.

== Playing career ==
Wahlberg made his SHL debut with the Malmö Redhawks during the 2021–22 season, playing in a single game. In the following 2022–23 season, Wahlberg showing development as a two-way center with an offensive touch improved his totals in the J20 Nationell League by recording 14 goals and 27 points in 32 games. His play earned him a 17-game stint with Malmö and a rookie contract, posting 2 goals and 4 points. In his first year of draft eligibility, Wahlberg was selected in the second round, 39th overall, by the Buffalo Sabres of the 2023 NHL entry draft.

On 14 July 2023, he was promptly signed by the Sabres to a three-year, entry-level contract. He was returned on loan by the Sabres to continue his progression in the SHL with the Malmö Redhawks for the 2023–24 season on 15 August 2023.

Approaching the 2026 NHL entry draft, having played exclusively with the Sabres AHL affiliate, the Rochester Americans in North America, Wahlberg was traded alongside a second-round pick to the Anaheim Ducks in exchange for Olen Zellweger on 26 June 2026.

== International play ==
Medal record

Representing Sweden

Ice hockey

World Junior Championships
| Silver medal – second place | 2024 Sweden | |

World U18 Championships
| Silver medal – second place | 2023 Switzerland | |

Wahlberg represented Sweden at the 2024 World Junior Ice Hockey Championships and won a silver medal.

== Career statistics ==
=== Regular season and playoffs ===
| | | | Regular season | | | | | Playoffs |
| Season | Team | League | GP | G | A | Pts | PIM | GP | G | A | Pts | PIM |
|---|---|---|---|---|---|---|---|---|---|---|---|---|
| 2019–20 | Malmö Redhawks | J18 | 1 | 0 | 0 | 0 | 0 | — | — | — | — | — |
| 2021–22 | Malmö Redhawks | SHL | 1 | 0 | 0 | 0 | 0 | — | — | — | — | — |
| 2021–22 | Malmö Redhawks | J20 | 22 | 3 | 4 | 7 | 12 | 7 | 1 | 3 | 4 | 10 |
| 2021–22 | Malmö Redhawks | J18 | 24 | 12 | 26 | 28 | 10 | — | — | — | — | — |
| 2022–23 | Malmö Redhawks | SHL | 17 | 2 | 2 | 4 | 0 | 5 | 1 | 0 | 1 | 0 |
| 2022–23 | Malmö Redhawks | J20 | 32 | 14 | 13 | 27 | 53 | 2 | 0 | 1 | 1 | 0 |
| 2022–23 | Malmö Redhawks | J18 | 3 | 1 | 3 | 4 | 0 | — | — | — | — | — |
| 2023–24 | Malmö Redhawks | SHL | 43 | 5 | 5 | 10 | 4 | — | — | — | — | — |
| 2023–24 | Rochester Americans | AHL | 9 | 1 | 3 | 4 | 6 | 5 | 1 | 0 | 1 | 0 |
| 2024–25 | Rochester Americans | AHL | 63 | 11 | 19 | 30 | 6 | 6 | 0 | 0 | 0 | 0 |
| 2025–26 | Rochester Americans | AHL | 68 | 9 | 29 | 38 | 20 | 3 | 0 | 3 | 3 | 0 |
| SHL totals | | | 61 | 7 | 7 | 14 | 4 | 5 | 1 | 0 | 1 | 0 |

=== International ===
| Year | Team | Event | Result | GP | G | A | Pts | PIM |
|---|---|---|---|---|---|---|---|---|
| 2022 | Sweden | WJAC | 3rd place, bronze medalist(s) | 6 | 1 | 2 | 3 | 6 |
| 2023 | Sweden | U18 | 2nd place, silver medalist(s) | 7 | 3 | 3 | 4 | 16 |
| 2024 | Sweden | WJC | 2nd place, silver medalist(s) | 7 | 1 | 2 | 3 | 2 |
| 2025 | Sweden | WJC | 4th | 7 | 4 | 4 | 8 | 2 |
| Junior totals | | | | 27 | 9 | 11 | 20 | 26 |
