= Michael Hrabal =

Czech ice hockey player (born 2005)

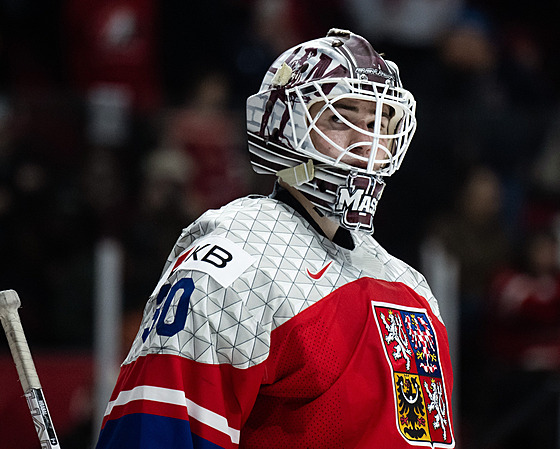
- Born: 20 January 2005 (age 21) Prague, Czech Republic
- Height: 6 ft 7 in (201 cm)
- Weight: 216 lb (98 kg; 15 st 6 lb)
- Position: Goaltender
- Catches: Left
- NHL team (P) Cur. team: Utah Mammoth; Tucson Roadrunners (AHL)
- NHL draft: 38th overall, 2023; Arizona Coyotes
- Playing career: 2026–present

Michael Hrabal (born 20 January 2005) is a Czech ice hockey goaltender for the Tucson Roadrunners of the American Hockey League (AHL) while under contract to the Utah Mammoth of the National Hockey League (NHL). He was drafted 38th overall by the Arizona Coyotes in the 2023 NHL entry draft. He played college ice hockey at UMass.

== Playing career ==
=== Junior ===
Hrabal played one season with the Omaha Lancers of the United States Hockey League (USHL). During the 2022–23 season he posted a 9–13–7 record with a 2.86 goals against average (GAA) and .908 save percentage. Following the season he was named to the USHL All-Rookie First team.

On 29 June 2023, Hrabal was drafted in the second round, 38th overall, by the Arizona Coyotes in the 2023 NHL entry draft.

=== College ===
He began his college ice hockey career during the 2023–24 season. During his rookie year he appeared in 30 games and posted a 16–12–1 record, with a 2.59 GAA, a .912 save percentage and two shutouts. Following the season he was named to the Hockey East Second All-Star Team, the first UMass goaltender to do so as a rookie. During the 2024–25 season, in his sophomore year, he appeared in 36 games, and posted a 19–12–5 record, with a 2.37 GAA, a .924 save percentage and two shutouts. His 1,028 saves ranks second all-time in single-season program history, while his 19 wins tied for third in single-season program history.

During the 2025–26 season, in his junior year, he appeared in 29 games, and posted a 19–9–1 record, with a 1.95 GAA and a .937 save percentage. Among goalies who have played in 15 games or more since January 10, he led the NCAA in wins (13), goals against (22), shutouts (4), GAA (1.37), and save percentage (.958), and ranked fifth in saves (502). In 18 Hockey East conference games, he posted a .952 save percentage, the second-best percentage in league history, and a 1.55 GAA, the fourth-best since Hockey East was founded. His .952 save percentage was .001 off the Hockey East record. He led all Hockey East goalies in both categories, as well as with four shutouts, and ranked second with 12 wins. Nationally, his four overall shutouts are the second-most of any goalie, his .935 overall save percentage is third and his 18 wins is the fifth-highest total. Following an outstanding season he was unanimously selected to the All-Hockey East First Team, the Hockey East Player of the Year and Hockey East Goaltending Champion. He became the third Minuteman to be named Hockey East Player of the Year, and the first European-born player to claim the award. He was also named a top-three finalist for the Mike Richter Award.

He finished his collegiate career with a 54–33–7 record, a 2.31 GAA, a .925 save percentage, and eight shutouts. He ranks second in program history in wins and third in goals-against average and save percentage.

=== Professional ===
On 25 March 2026, Hrabal signed a three-year, entry-level contract with the Utah Mammoth, beginning during the 2026–27 season. He will report to the Mammoth's AHL affiliate, the Tucson Roadrunners, on a professional tryout (PTO).

== Career statistics ==
			Regular season									Playoffs
Season	Team	League	GP	W	L	OTL	MIN	GA	SO	GAA	SV%	GP	W	L	MIN	GA	SO	GAA	SV%
2022–23	Omaha Lancers	USHL	31	9	13	7	1,681	80	3	2.86	.908	—	—	—	—	—	—	—	—
2023–24	UMass-Amherst	HE	30	16	12	1	1,786	77	2	2.59	.912	—	—	—	—	—	—	—	—
2024–25	UMass-Amherst	HE	36	19	12	5	2,129	84	2	2.37	.924	—	—	—	—	—	—	—	—
2025–26	UMass-Amherst	HE	29	19	9	1	1,721	56	4	1.95	.937	—	—	—	—	—	—	—	—
2025–26	Tucson Roadrunners	AHL	5	3	1	1	304	15	0	2.96	.897	—	—	—	—	—	—	—	—
NCAA totals			95	54	33	7	5,636	217	12	2.31	.925	—	—	—	—	—	—	—	—

== Awards and honours ==
Award	Year	Ref
USHL
USHL All-Rookie First Team	2023	
College
All-Hockey East Second Team	2024	
All-Hockey East Third Team	2025	
All-Hockey East First Team	2026	
Hockey East Player of the Year	2026	
Hockey East Goaltending Champion	2026	
AHCA East First Team All-American	2026	

Awards and achievements
Preceded by Ryan Leonard	Hockey East Player of the Year; 2025–26	Succeeded by Incumbent
Preceded by Jacob Fowler	Hockey East Goaltending Champion; 2025–26	Succeeded by Incumbent
