= Sungod Recreation Centre =

Recreation centre in Delta, British Columbia, Canada

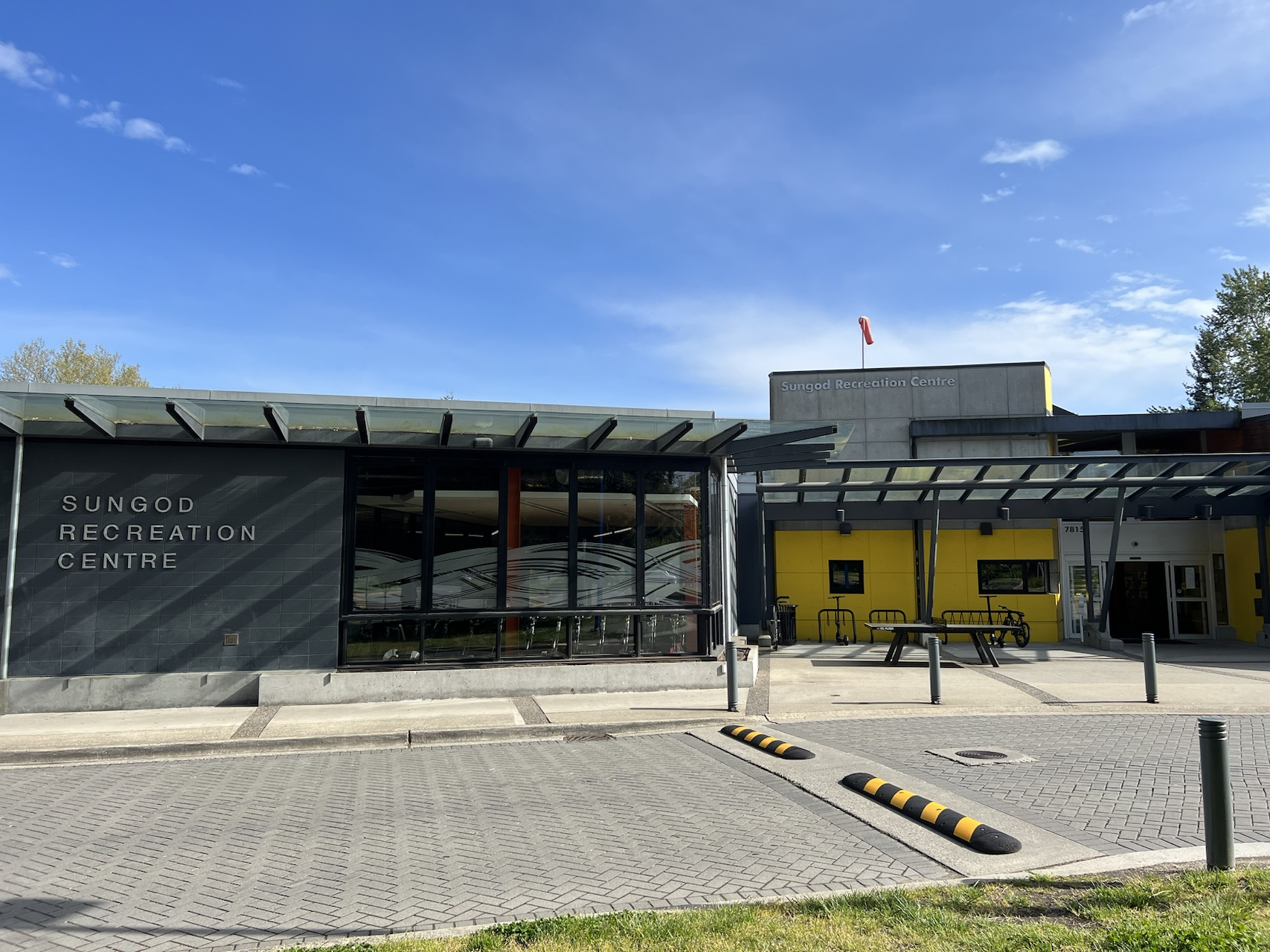
- Sungod Recreation Centre entrance in 2025.
- Interactive map of Sungod Recreation Centre
- Address: 7815 112 Street; Delta, British Columbia V4C 4V9; Canada
- Coordinates: 49.14542°N 122.91479°W
- Owner: City of Delta

Tenant
- North Delta Devils (PIJHL)

Website
- www.delta.ca/parks-recreation/parks-trails/park-and-amenity-search/sungod-recreation-centre

Sungod Recreation Centre is a recreation centre located in Delta, British Columbia. The facility contains four pools, a swirl pool, a sauna, a steam room, a weight room, an aerobic studio, and an ice rink. It also hosts swimming lessons including kids, teens, and lifeguard courses.

== Amenities & Services ==
Sungod is one of three recreation centers in North Delta, with the facility divided into a pool section, an arena section, a weight room, a cycle-fit studio, a gym, a fitness studio, meeting rooms, a customer service office and a Cravings Coffee coffee shop in the lobby, with many seating areas next to the pool.

=== Admission ===
The City of Delta announced that all Delta residents between the ages of 10-18 currently residing in Delta would have free access to all public amenities in recreation centers such as the weightroom and the pools. This also applies to infants under the age of 2, with free admission to everything except using the ice rink for skating lessons or applying for swimming lessons, which have extra costs and require booking.

All Delta residents that are seniors 60+ and children from 2–9 years old pay a smaller fee, with adults 19-59 paying full price, and Non-Delta residents paying more than Delta residents but follow the same system.

=== Pool Area ===
- Main pool - Contains two diving boards of different heights, a slide that is open when lifeguards are on duty, and some lanes used for water walking. Diving pool area is deep and diving boards are only open with permission from swim instructor or lifeguard.
- Sunshine pool - Large pool with divided lanes, often accessible to public but some lanes have designated speeds with usually only one swimmer per lane. At the far end of the pool, diving blocks have been installed, which are often used by the Delta Sungod Swim Club, a program for advanced young swimmers in Delta.
- Teach pool - swimming lessons are offered here for public and private lessons.
- Leisure pool - contains a lazy river, jacuzzi areas, and space to play, with water toys available often.
- Sauna - Public access with no children allowed.
- Steam room - Public access with no children allowed.
- Swirl pool (Hot tub) - Public access, young children not allowed in for more than 20 minutes.

==== Mechanical Systems ====
Original system with pool opening Fall 1977 Two Hi Rate Sand Filters one for each pool, main and teaching pool. Strantrol automated pool chemistry monitoring and adjustment. Gas chlorine delivery system. Natural Gas Boiler

==== Pool Design ====
T-shaped 25m x 25 m, 8 Lanes each way. 3 m and 1 m springboards.

=== Arena/Ice Rink ===
The arena is used for a variety of purposes, as the ice can be melted to be used as a stage but usually has ice year round, used for skating lessons, public and private skate days, hockey practices and games, and ice shows. The arena offers a large amount of seating, accommodating for large hockey tournament events, performances from the Sungod Skate Club such as Aladdin on Ice, and many other performances.

== Transportation ==
Sungod Recreation Center is served by TransLink bus route 312. The bus travels between Scott Road Station in the north, and Scottsdale Exchange in the south, offering connections to various other regions of Greater Vancouver via the Expo Line and other bus routes.
