= 2024 IIHF World U18 Championship Division II =

2024 IIHF U18 World Championship Division II
Tournament details
- Host countries: Poland; Spain
- Venues: 2 (in 2 host cities)
- Dates: 17–23 April 2024 (A); 17–23 March 2024 (B)
- Teams: 12

The 2024 IIHF U18 World Championship Division II consists of two international under-18 ice hockey tournaments organized by the International Ice Hockey Federation. The Divisions II A and II B represent the fourth and fifth tier of the IIHF World U18 Championship.

== Division II A ==
2024 IIHF U18 World Championship Division II A

Tournament details
- Host country: Poland
- City: Sosnowiec
- Venue: 1 (in 1 host city)
- Dates: 17–23 April 2024
- Teams: 6

Tournament statistics
- Games played: 15
- Goals scored: 107 (7.13 per game)
- Attendance: 6,193 (413 per game)
- Scoring leader: (United Kingdom) Brynley Capps (11 points)

Official website
- www.iihf.com

The Division II Group A tournament was played in Sosnowiec, Poland, from 17 to 23 April 2024.

=== Participating teams ===
Team	Qualification
Poland	Hosts; placed 6th in 2023 Division I B and were relegated
Croatia	Placed 2nd in 2023 Division II A
Great Britain	Placed 3rd in 2023 Division II A
Serbia	Placed 4th in 2023 Division II A
Romania	Placed 5th in 2023 Division II A
Netherlands	Placed 1st in 2023 Division II B and were promoted

=== Standings ===
Pos	Team	Pld	W	OTW	OTL	L	GF	GA	GD	Pts	Promotion or relegation
1	Poland (H)	5	5	0	0	0	34	5	+29	15	Promoted to the 2025 Division I B
2	Great Britain	5	4	0	0	1	30	11	+19	12	
3	Netherlands	5	3	0	0	2	18	19	−1	9	
4	Romania	5	1	0	1	3	8	25	−17	4	
5	Croatia	5	1	0	0	4	11	21	−10	3	
6	Serbia	5	0	1	0	4	6	26	−20	2	Relegated to the 2025 Division II B

Source: IIHF
Rules for classification: 1) points; 2) head-to-head points; 3) head-to-head goal difference; 4) head-to-head number of goals scored; 5) result against closest best-ranked team outside tied teams; 6) result against second-best ranked team outside tied teams; 7) seeding before tournament.
(H) Host

=== Results and schedule ===
All times are local. (Central European Summer Time – UTC+2)

17 April 2024; 13:00	Croatia	2–3 (1–0, 1–2, 0–1)	Romania	Winter Stadium, Sosnowiec; Attendance: 50

Game reference
12 min	Penalties	8 min
18	Shots	34

17 April 2024; 16:30	Great Britain	4–6 (0–3, 2–0, 2–3)	Poland	Winter Stadium, Sosnowiec; Attendance: 700

Game reference
6 min	Penalties	2 min
16	Shots	23

17 April 2024; 20:00	Netherlands	7–2 (2–0, 3–0, 2–2)	Serbia	Winter Stadium, Sosnowiec; Attendance: 100

Game reference
8 min	Penalties	12 min
31	Shots	28

18 April 2024; 13:00	Croatia	2–4 (2–1, 0–1, 0–2)	Great Britain	Winter Stadium, Sosnowiec; Attendance: 130

Game reference
10 min	Penalties	6 min
20	Shots	42

18 April 2024; 16:30	Romania	2–5 (2–1, 0–1, 0–3)	Netherlands	Winter Stadium, Sosnowiec; Attendance: 160

Game reference
33 min	Penalties	12 min
37	Shots	29

18 April 2024; 20:00	Poland	10–1 (2–1, 4–0, 4–0)	Serbia	Winter Stadium, Sosnowiec; Attendance: 1100

Game reference
6 min	Penalties	8 min
59	Shots	12

20 April 2024; 13:00	Great Britain	4–0 (2–0, 1–0, 1–0)	Serbia	Winter Stadium, Sosnowiec; Attendance: 126

Game reference
16 min	Penalties	10 min
39	Shots	9

20 April 2024; 16:30	Poland	7–0 (0–0, 5–0, 2–0)	Romania	Winter Stadium, Sosnowiec; Attendance: 1200

Game reference
2 min	Penalties	14 min
34	Shots	15

20 April 2024; 20:00	Croatia	3–5 (1–1, 0–3, 2–1)	Netherlands	Winter Stadium, Sosnowiec; Attendance: 117

Game reference
12 min	Penalties	14 min
28	Shots	30

21 April 2024; 13:00	Romania	2–9 (1–3, 0–2, 1–4)	Great Britain	Winter Stadium, Sosnowiec; Attendance: 110

Game reference
8 min	Penalties	10 min
18	Shots	36

21 April 2024; 16:30	Serbia	1–4 (1–1, 0–1, 0–2)	Croatia	Winter Stadium, Sosnowiec; Attendance: 80

Game reference
4 min	Penalties	10 min
21	Shots	31

21 April 2024; 20:00	Netherlands	0–3 (0–2, 0–0, 0–1)	Poland	Winter Stadium, Sosnowiec; Attendance: 1,050

Game reference
8 min	Penalties	6 min
14	Shots	55

23 April 2024; 13:00	Serbia	2–1 OT (0–0, 0–1, 1–0); OT: (1–0)	Romania	Winter Stadium, Sosnowiec; Attendance: 50

Game reference
4 min	Penalties	10 min
20	Shots	28

23 April 2024; 16:30	Great Britain	9–1 (3–0, 4–0, 2–1)	Netherlands	Winter Stadium, Sosnowiec; Attendance: 120

Game reference
35 min	Penalties	14 min
38	Shots	19

23 April 2024; 20:00	Poland	8–0 (5–0, 1–0, 2–0)	Croatia	Winter Stadium, Sosnowiec; Attendance: 1,100

Game reference
2 min	Penalties	4 min
47	Shots	8

== Division II B ==
2024 IIHF U18 World Championship Division II B

Tournament details
- Host country: Spain
- City: Puigcerdà
- Venue: 1 (in 1 host city)
- Dates: 17–23 March 2024
- Teams: 6

Tournament statistics
- Games played: 15
- Goals scored: 142 (9.47 per game)
- Attendance: 2,778 (185 per game)
- Scoring leader: (China) Xu Ziheng (15 points)

Official website
- www.iihf.com

The Division II Group B tournament was played in Puigcerdà, Spain, from 17 to 23 March 2024.

=== Participating teams ===
Team	Qualification
Spain	Hosts; placed 6th in 2023 Division II A and were relegated
China	Placed 2nd in 2023 Division II B
Chinese Taipei	Placed 3rd in 2023 Division II B
Bulgaria	Placed 4th in 2023 Division II B
Australia	Placed 5th in 2023 Division II B
Israel	Placed 1st in 2023 Division III A and were promoted

=== Standings ===
Pos	Team	Pld	W	OTW	OTL	L	GF	GA	GD	Pts	Promotion or relegation
1	China	5	5	0	0	0	30	15	+15	15	Promoted to the 2025 Division II A
2	Spain (H)	5	3	0	1	1	33	14	+19	10	
3	Bulgaria	5	2	1	0	2	23	22	+1	8	
4	Australia	5	2	0	1	2	23	23	0	7	
5	Chinese Taipei	5	1	1	0	3	15	26	−11	5	
6	Israel	5	0	0	0	5	18	42	−24	0	Relegated to the 2025 Division III A

Source: IIHF
Rules for classification: 1) points; 2) head-to-head points; 3) head-to-head goal difference; 4) head-to-head number of goals scored; 5) result against closest best-ranked team outside tied teams; 6) result against second-best ranked team outside tied teams; 7) seeding before tournament.
(H) Host

=== Results ===
All times are local. (Central European Time – UTC+1)

17 March 2024; 13:00	China	6–3 (3–3, 1–0, 2–0)	Australia	Poliesportiu Puigcerdà, Puigcerdà; Attendance: 67

Game reference
6 min	Penalties	10 min
27	Shots	18

17 March 2024; 16:30	Israel	6–7 (1–3, 4–3, 1–1)	Bulgaria	Poliesportiu Puigcerdà, Puigcerdà; Attendance: 87

Game reference
35 min	Penalties	41 min
35	Shots	25

17 March 2024; 20:00	Chinese Taipei	0–6 (0–1, 0–2, 0–3)	Spain	Poliesportiu Puigcerdà, Puigcerdà; Attendance: 275

Game reference
12 min	Penalties	10 min
20	Shots	55

18 March 2024; 13:00	Australia	12–4 (5–2, 3–1, 4–1)	Israel	Poliesportiu Puigcerdà, Puigcerdà; Attendance: 69

Game reference
14 min	Penalties	16 min
38	Shots	29

18 March 2024; 16:30	China	5–3 (1–1, 3–1, 1–1)	Chinese Taipei	Poliesportiu Puigcerdà, Puigcerdà; Attendance: 60

Game reference
18 min	Penalties	16 min
40	Shots	21

18 March 2024; 20:00	Spain	4–5 OT (3–1, 1–0, 0–3); OT: (0–1)	Bulgaria	Poliesportiu Puigcerdà, Puigcerdà; Attendance: 248

Game reference
16 min	Penalties	12 min
39	Shots	26

20 March 2024; 13:00	Chinese Taipei	2–8 (1–3, 0–3, 1–2)	Bulgaria	Poliesportiu Puigcerdà, Puigcerdà; Attendance: 33

Game reference
10 min	Penalties	6 min
33	Shots	33

20 March 2024; 16:30	China	7–4 (2–1, 5–2, 0–1)	Israel	Poliesportiu Puigcerdà, Puigcerdà; Attendance: 130

Game reference
12 min	Penalties	10 min
34	Shots	37

20 March 2024; 20:00	Spain	7–1 (1–1, 4–0, 2–0)	Australia	Poliesportiu Puigcerdà, Puigcerdà; Attendance: 455

Game reference
14 min	Penalties	10 min
30	Shots	26

21 March 2024; 13:00	Bulgaria	2–7 (1–4, 1–2, 0–1)	China	Poliesportiu Puigcerdà, Puigcerdà; Attendance: 25

Game reference
10 min	Penalties	31 min
16	Shots	38

21 March 2024; 16:30	Australia	4–5 OT (0–0, 0–4, 4–0); OT: (0–1)	Chinese Taipei	Poliesportiu Puigcerdà, Puigcerdà; Attendance: 67

Game reference
4 min	Penalties	4 min
44	Shots	30

21 March 2024; 20:00	Israel	1–11 (0–2, 0–6, 1–3)	Spain	Poliesportiu Puigcerdà, Puigcerdà; Attendance: 320

Game reference
68 min	Penalties	16 min
14	Shots	56

23 March 2024; 13:00	Chinese Taipei	5–3 (2–0, 0–3, 3–0)	Israel	Poliesportiu Puigcerdà, Puigcerdà; Attendance: 70

Game reference
4 min	Penalties	10 min
30	Shots	43

23 March 2024; 16:30	Bulgaria	1–3 (1–0, 0–0, 0–3)	Australia	Poliesportiu Puigcerdà, Puigcerdà; Attendance: 120

Game reference
0 min	Penalties	0 min
11	Shots	52

23 March 2024; 20:00	Spain	2–8 (2–0, 0–3, 3–0)	China	Poliesportiu Puigcerdà, Puigcerdà; Attendance: 752

Game reference
10 min	Penalties	10 min
36	Shots	28
