= Ryan Leonard (ice hockey) =

American ice hockey player (born 2005)

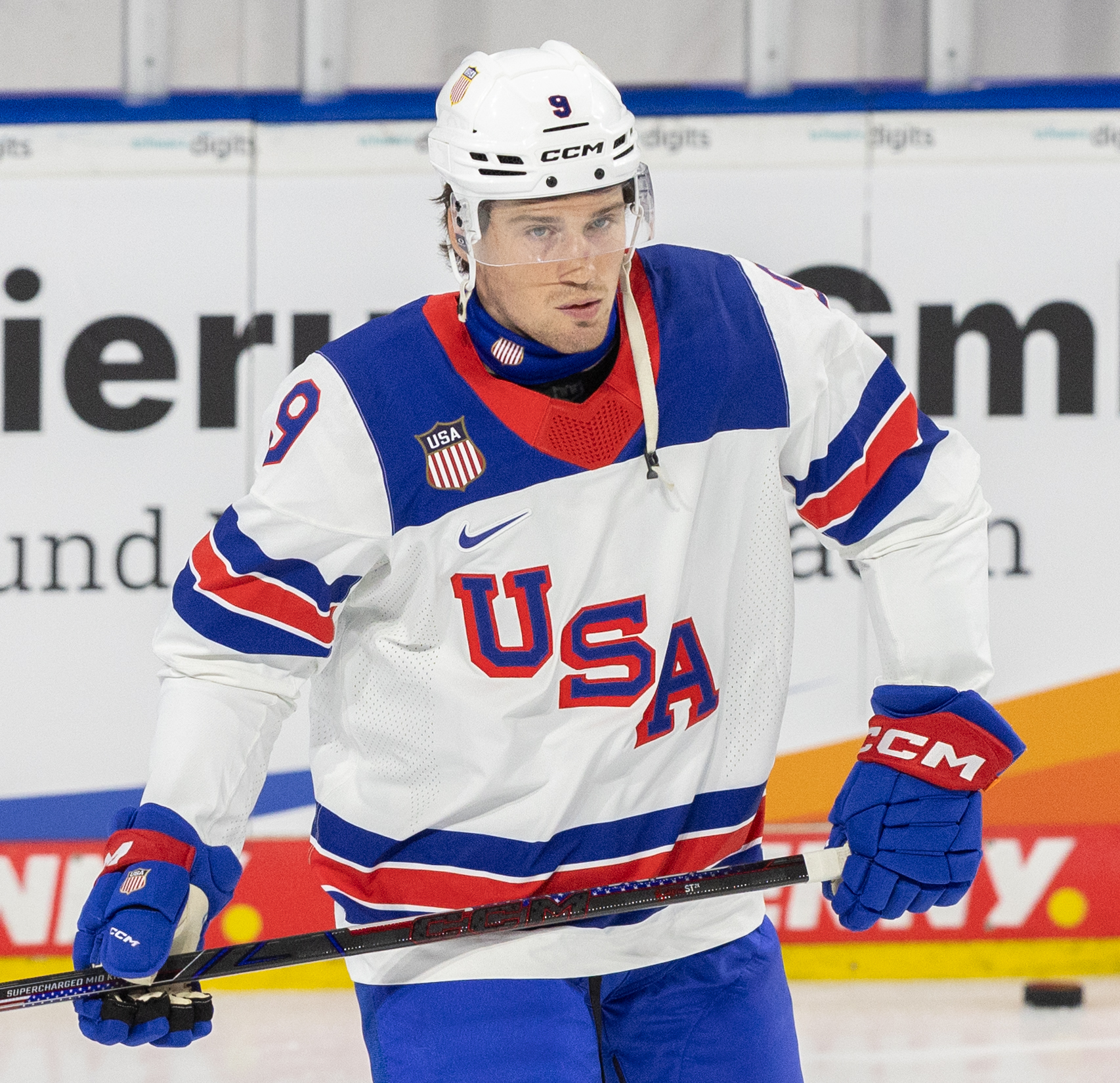
- Leonard in 2026
- Born: January 21, 2005 (age 21) Northampton, Massachusetts, U.S.
- Height: 6 ft 1 in (185 cm)
- Weight: 205 lb (93 kg; 14 st 9 lb)
- Position: Forward
- Shoots: Right
- NHL team: Washington Capitals
- National team: United States
- NHL draft: 8th overall, 2023; Washington Capitals
- Playing career: 2025–present

Ryan Leonard (born January 21, 2005) is an American professional ice hockey player who is a forward for the Washington Capitals of the National Hockey League (NHL). He was selected eighth overall by the Capitals in the 2023 NHL entry draft. He played college ice hockey at Boston College for two seasons and made his NHL debut at the end of the 2024–25 season.

== Playing career ==
=== College ===
Leonard began his college ice hockey at Boston College during the 2023–24 season. During his freshman year he recorded 31 goals and 29 assists in 41 games. Following the season he was named to the All-Hockey East Second Team, Hockey East All-Rookie Team, and an AHCA East Second Team All-American.

During the 2024–25 season, in his sophomore year, he recorded 30 goals and 19 assists in 37 games. He led the NCAA in goals, and became the first player with consecutive 30-goal seasons since Cam Atkinson in the 2009–10 and 2010–11 seasons. During conference play he led Hockey East in goals (25), points (37), points per game (1.54), shots (116), game-winning goals (8), and plus-minus (+25). Following the season he was named to the All-Hockey East First Team, the Hockey East Scoring Champion, Hockey East Player of the Year, and won the Hockey East Three-Stars Award. He was also named a Hobey Hat Trick finalist for the 2025 Hobey Baker Award, and a AHCA East First Team All-American.

=== Professional ===
On March 31, 2025, Leonard signed a three-year, entry-level contract with the Washington Capitals. He made his NHL debut the next day in a game against his hometown team, the Boston Bruins, with many of his former Boston College teammates in attendance. Leonard scored his first career goal, an empty netter, in the following game on April 4, in a 5–3 win against the Chicago Blackhawks. He finished the season playing in nine regular season games and eight playoff games, recording a total of one goal and one assist.

On December 5, 2025, Leonard was hit by defenseman, Jacob Trouba, and left after the first period in what would end up being a 4–3 shootout loss against the Anaheim Ducks. Two days later, Leonard was put on injured reserve due to an upper-body injury. He returned to the lineup on December 23 after missing seven games. Leonard finished his first full season in the NHL playing in 75 games and recording 45 points (20 goals, 25 assists), ranking third among rookies in both power play points and goals scored 5-on-5.

On September 15, 2026, the Capitals signed Leonard to an eight-year, $84 million contract extension, carrying an average annual value of $10.5 million. Leonard played his 100th career NHL game on November 10 in a 3–2 win against the Ottawa Senators; he became just the fifth Capital since 1990 to score 25-plus goals through their first 100 career games.

== International play ==
Medal record

Representing United States

Men's ice hockey

World Junior Championships
Gold medal – first place	2024 Sweden	
Gold medal – first place	2025 Canada	

World U18 Championships
Gold medal – first place	2023 Switzerland	
Silver medal – second place	2022 Germany	

Leonard represented the United States under-18 team at the 2022 World U18 Championships, where he recorded five goals and one assist in six games and won a silver medal. He again represented the United States at the 2023 World U18 Championships, where he recorded eight goals and nine assists in seven games. He scored the game-winning goal in overtime of the championship game against Sweden under-18 team to help win a gold medal.

On December 16, 2023, Leonard was named to the United States junior team to compete at the 2024 World Junior Championships. During the tournament he recorded three goals and three assists in seven games and won a gold medal. He again represented the United States at the 2025 World Junior Championships, where he served as team captain and recorded five goals and five assists in seven games and won a gold medal. He was subsequently named the inaugural Murray Costello World Junior Championship MVP award winner. He helped win back-to-back gold medals at the IIHF World Junior Championship for the first time in history.

== Personal life ==
Leonard was born to parents John and Cindy Leonard. He has three siblings. His brother, John, is a professional ice hockey player. His father, John Sr., was an assistant coach for the UMass Minutemen basketball team between 2001 and 2005.

== Career statistics ==
=== Regular season and playoffs ===
			Regular season					Playoffs
Season	Team	League	GP	G	A	Pts	PIM	GP	G	A	Pts	PIM
2021–22	U.S. National Development Team	USHL	33	10	5	15	22	—	—	—	—	—
2022–23	U.S. National Development Team	USHL	17	11	9	20	18	—	—	—	—	—
2023–24	Boston College	HE	41	31	29	60	38	—	—	—	—	—
2024–25	Boston College	HE	37	30	19	49	46	—	—	—	—	—
2024–25	Washington Capitals	NHL	9	1	0	1	11	8	0	1	1	2
2025–26	Washington Capitals	NHL	75	20	25	45	47	—	—	—	—	—
NHL totals			84	21	25	46	58	8	0	1	1	2

=== International ===
Year	Team	Event	Result	GP	G	A	Pts	PIM
2022	United States	U18	2nd place, silver medalist(s)	6	5	1	6	6
2023	United States	U18	1st place, gold medalist(s)	7	8	9	17	4
2024	United States	WJC	1st place, gold medalist(s)	7	3	3	6	4
2024	United States	WC	5th	6	0	1	1	2
2025	United States	WJC	1st place, gold medalist(s)	7	5	5	10	12
2026	United States	WC	8th	8	3	2	5	10
Junior totals				27	21	18	39	26
Senior totals				14	3	3	6	12

== Awards and honors ==
Award	Year	Ref
College
All-Hockey East Hockey East Second Team	2024	
Hockey East All-Rookie Team	2024	
AHCA East Second Team All-American	2024	
All-Hockey East First Team	2025	
Hockey East Three-Stars Award	2025	
Hockey East Scoring Champion	2025	
Hockey East Player of the Year	2025	
AHCA East First Team All-American	2025	
International
IIHF World Junior Championship best forward	2025	
IIHF World Junior Championship Most Valuable Player	2025	
IIHF World Junior Championship Media All-Star team	2025	

Awards and achievements
Preceded by Macklin Celebrini	Hockey East Player of the Year; 2024–25	Succeeded by Michael Hrabal
Preceded by Macklin Celebrini	Hockey East Three-Stars Award; 2024–25	Succeeded by James Hagens
Preceded by Macklin Celebrini	Hockey East Scoring Champion; 2024–25	Succeeded by James Hagens
Preceded by Ivan Miroshnichenko	Washington Capitals first-round draft pick 2023	Succeeded by Terik Parascak
