= Leinonen =

Leinonen is a Finnish surname. Notable people with the surname include:

- Artturi Leinonen (1888–1963), Finnish journalist, writer and politician
- Eeva Leinonen (born 1958), Finnish academic and head of Australian and Irish universities
- Jani Leinonen (born 1978), Finnish artist
- Kaarlo Leinonen (1914–1975), Finnish general and Minister of Defence
- Kimmo Leinonen (born 1949), Finnish ice hockey executive and writer
- Mikko Leinonen (born 1955), Finnish ice hockey player
- Sanni Leinonen (born 1989), Finnish alpine skier
- Tero Leinonen (born 1975), Finnish ice hockey goaltender
- Topias Leinonen (born 2004), Finnish ice hockey goaltender
- Ville Leinonen (born 1975), Finnish singer and songwriter
