= 2025–26 Rochester Americans season =

American Hockey League season

2025–26 Rochester Americans
- Division: North
- Conference: Eastern
- 2025–26 record: 2–1–0–0
- Home record: 1–0–0–0
- Road record: 0–1–0–0
- Goals for: 12
- Goals against: 11

Team information
- General manager: Jason Karmanos (Oct. 10 – Dec. 20); Vacant (Dec. 20 – pres.)
- Coach: Michael Leone
- Captain: Zach Metsa
- Alternate captains: Jack Rathbone; Josh Dunne; Brendan Warren; Carson Meyer
- Minor league affiliate: Jacksonville Icemen (ECHL)

The 2025–26 Rochester Americans season is the 70th season of play for the Amerks in the American Hockey League (AHL), the 44th as the primary affiliate of the Buffalo Sabres, and the second with head coach, Michael Leone.

== Schedule and results ==
The AHL season schedule was revealed on July 10, 2025, with the Amerks season beginning on October 10, 2025, and ending on April 19, 2026.

=== Regular season ===
2025–26 game log

October: 7–2–0–0 (Home: 3–0–0–0; Road: 4–2–0–0)
#	Date	Visitor	Score	Home	OT	Decision	Attendance	Record	Pts	Recap
1	October 10	Toronto	3–4	Rochester		Levi (1-0-0-0)		1–0–0–0	2
2	October 11	Rochester	1–4	Toronto		Leinonen (0-1-0-0)		1–1–0–0	2
3	October 17	Rochester	7–4	Utica		Levi (2-0-0-0)		2–1–0–0	4
4	October 18	Rochester	0–3	Syracuse		Georgiev (0-1-0-0)		2–2–0–0	4
5	October 22	Syracuse	2–4	Rochester		Luukkonen (1-0-0-0)		3–2–0–0	6
6	October 24	Laval	0–4	Rochester		Levi (2-0-0-0)		4–2–0–0	8
7	October 25	Rochester	4–3	Cleveland	OT	Leinonen (1-1-0-0)		5–2–0–0	10
8	October 29	Rochester	4–1	Belleville		Levi (3-0-0-0)		6–2–0–0	12
9	October 31	Rochester	2–1	Laval		Levi (4-0-0-0)		7–2–0–0	14

November: 5–7–0–0 (Home: 2–4–0–0; Road: 3–3–0–0)
#	Date	Visitor	Score	Home	OT	Decision	Attendance	Record	Pts	Recap
10	November 1	Rochester	2–5	Laval		Georgiev (0-2-0-0)		7–3–0–0	14
11	November 5	Syracuse	5–3	Rochester		Levi (4-1-0-0)		7–4–0–0	14
12	November 7	Wilkes-Barre/Scranton	2–6	Rochester		Levi (5-1-0-0)		8–4–0–0	16
13	November 9	Rochester	1–2	Hershey		Leinonen (1-2-0-0)		8–5–0–0	16
14	November 12	Belleville	6–4	Rochester		Levi (5-2-0-0)		8–6–0–0	16
15	November 14	Rochester	4–3	Hartford	OT	Leinonen (2-2-0-0)		9–6–0–0	18
16	November 15	Rochester	5–3	Bridgeport		Levi (6-2-0-0)		10–6–0–0	20
17	November 19	Rochester	2–4	Lehigh Valley		Levi (6-3-0-0)		10–7–0–0	20
18	November 21	Bridgeport	5–4	Rochester		Leinonen (2-3-0-0)		10–8–0–0	20
19	November 22	Rochester	4–3	Utica		Levi (7-3-0-0)		11–8–0–0	22
20	November 26	Cleveland	3–1	Rochester		Levi (7-4-0-0)		11–9–0–0	22
21	November 28	Syracuse	3–4	Rochester		Levi (8-4-0-0)		12–9–0–0	24

December: 0–0–0–0 (Home: 0–0–0–0; Road: 0–0–0–0)
#	Date	Visitor	Score	Home	OT	Decision	Attendance	Record	Pts	Recap
22	December 3	Utica	–	Rochester
23	December 5	Rochester	–	Charlotte
24	December 6	Rochester	–	Charlotte
25	December 10	Rochester	–	Belleville
26	December 13	Lehigh Valley	–	Rochester
27	December 19	Belleville	–	Rochester
28	December 27	Cleveland	–	Rochester
29	December 29	Rochester	–	Cleveland

January: 0–0–0–0 (Home: 0–0–0–0; Road: 0–0–0–0)
#	Date	Visitor	Score	Home	OT	Decision	Attendance	Record	Pts	Recap
30	January 3	Rochester	–	Toronto
31	January 7	Rochester	–	Syracuse
32	January 9	Laval	–	Rochester
33	January 11	Rochester	–	Belleville
34	January 14	Syracuse	–	Rochester
35	January 16	Rochester	–	Belleville
36	January 17	Rochester	–	Utica
37	January 19	Rochester	–	Syracuse
38	January 23	Utica	–	Rochester
39	January 24	Cleveland	–	Rochester
40	January 28	Hershey	–	Rochester
41	January 30	Hershey	–	Rochester

February: 0–0–0–0 (Home: 0–0–0–0; Road: 0–0–0–0)
#	Date	Visitor	Score	Home	OT	Decision	Attendance	Record	Pts	Recap
42	February 4	Belleville	–	Rochester
43	February 6	Springfield	–	Rochester
44	February 7	Rochester	–	Utica
45	February 14	Rochester	–	Utica
46	February 15	Utica	–	Rochester
47	February 18	Charlotte	–	Rochester
48	February 20	Laval	–	Rochester
49	February 25	Rochester	–	Cleveland
50	February 27	Laval	–	Rochester

March: 0–0–0–0 (Home: 0–0–0–0; Road: 0–0–0–0)
#	Date	Visitor	Score	Home	OT	Decision	Attendance	Record	Pts	Recap
51	March 1	Rochester	–	Syracuse
52	March 6	Rochester	–	Laval
53	March 7	Rochester	–	Laval
54	March 11	Utica	–	Rochester
55	March 13	Toronto	–	Rochester
56	March 14	Rochester	–	Toronto
57	March 20	Syracuse	–	Rochester
58	March 22	Hartford	–	Rochester
59	March 27	Toronto	–	Rochester
60	March 28	Rochester	–	Syracuse
61	March 29	Syracuse	–	Rochester

April: 0–0–0–0 (Home: 0–0–0–0; Road: 0–0–0–0)
#	Date	Visitor	Score	Home	OT	Decision	Attendance	Record	Pts	Recap
62	April 1	Charlotte	–	Rochester
63	April 3	Belleville	–	Rochester
64	April 4	Providence	–	Rochester
65	April 6	Rochester	–	Cleveland
66	April 8	Rochester	–	Syracuse
67	April 10	Rochester	–	Springfield
68	April 11	Rochester	–	Providence
69	April 17	Cleveland	–	Rochester
70	April 18	Rochester	–	Wilkes-Barre/Scranton
71	April 19	Rochester	–	Hershey

Legend: Win (2 points) Loss (0 points) Overtime/shootout loss (1 point)
