= 2022 Hlinka Gretzky Cup =

Tournament details
- Host country: Canada
- Venue: 1 (in 1 host city)
- Dates: 31 July 2022 – 6 August 2022
- Teams: 8

Final positions
- Champions: Canada (23rd title)
- Runners-up: Sweden
- Third place: Finland
- Fourth place: Czech Republic

Tournament statistics
- Games played: 18
- Goals scored: 121 (6.72 per game)
- Scoring leader: (Canada) Calum Ritchie (10 points)

Official website
- hlinkagretzkycup.ca

The 2022 Hlinka Gretzky Cup (branded as the 2022 Hlinka Gretzky Cup presented by Ram for sponsorship reasons) was an under-18 international ice hockey tournament held in Red Deer, Alberta, Canada from 31 July 2022 – 6 August 2022 at Peavey Mart Centrium.

== Preliminary round ==
All times are Mountain Daylight Time (UTC-6).

=== Group A ===
Pos	Team	Pld	W	OTW	OTL	L	GF	GA	GD	Pts	Qualification
1	Canada (H)	3	3	0	0	0	26	1	+25	9	Semifinals
2	Sweden	3	2	0	0	1	13	7	+6	6	Semifinals
3	Slovakia	3	0	1	0	2	5	15	−10	2	Fifth place game
4	Switzerland	3	0	0	1	2	5	26	−21	1	Seventh place game

Source: hlinkagretzkycup.ca
(H) Host

31 July; 19:00	Canada	14–0 (8–0, 4–0, 2–0)	Switzerland	Peavey Mart Centrium

Scott Ratzlaff
Goalies
Ewan Huet
Diego Simeoni

Barlow (Molendyk, Ratzlaff) – sh – 2:02	1–0
Rehkopf (Ritchie, Allen) – 7:29	2–0
Barlow (Barkey) – sh – 8:53	3–0
Gauthier (Benson) – sh – 9:58	4–0
Yager (Rehkopf, Ritchie) – 10:43	5–0
Gauthier (Heidt, Benson) – pp – 11:11	6–0
Wood (Allen, Yager) – pp – 16:44	7–0
Cristall (Wood, Tourigny) – pp – 17:50	8–0
Lind (Ritchie, Tourigny) – 21:42	9–0
Barkey (Allen, Barlow) – 24:12	10–0
Gauthier (Price) – pp – 37:52	11–0
Price (Howe, Allen) – 38:24	12–0
Ritchie (Wood) – 50:22	13–0
Heidt (Cristall) – 39:51	14–0

12 min
Penalties
8 min
52
Shots
17

1 August; 11:00	Sweden	4–1 (0–0, 1–0, 3–1)	Slovakia	Peavey Mart Centrium

Noah Erliden
Goalies
Samuel Urban

Forsfjäll (Stenberg, Erliden) – 38:35	1–0
	1–1	45:44 – Eperješi (Molnár)
Stenberg (Sagranden, Forsfjäll) – pp – 46:03	2–1
Edstrom (Nilsson, Landén) – 53:56	3–1
Stenberg (Edstrom, Kostadinski) – en – 58:47	4–1

14 min
Penalties
10 min
39
Shots
33

2 August; 11:00	Switzerland	3–9 (1–3, 1–3, 1–3)	Sweden	Peavey Mart Centrium

Diego Simeoni
Goalies
Noah Erliden

	0–1	1:46 – pp – Nordh (Stenberg, Lindstein)
	0–2	5:18 – Kling (Pettersson, Bergström)
	0–3	8:45 – Nordh (Willander, Lindstein)
Meier (Horak, Pedrazzini) – 10:06	1–3
	1–4	28:51 – pp – Stenberg (Lindstein, Forsfjäll)
Braillard (Pedrazzini, Meier) – 29:20	2–4
	2–5	35:51 – pp – Sagranden (Forsfjäll, Stenberg)
	2–6	36:57 – Johansson (F. Nilsson, Sagranden)
Braillard (Meier, Lindemann) – pp – 43:52	3–6
	3–7	50:58 – Kangas (Kling, N. Nilsson)
	3–8	52:45 – pp – Lindstein (N. Nilsson, Stenberg)
	3–9	59:05 – Pettersson (Lindstein, Sagranden)

8 min
Penalties
4 min
19
Shots
40

2 August; 19:00	Slovakia	1–9 (0–2, 0–4, 1–3)	Canada	Peavey Mart Centrium

Samuel Urban
Damian Slávik
Goalies
Carson Bjarnason

	0–1	5:15 – pp – Yager (Molendyk, Ritchie)
	0–2	15:59 – Benson (Price, Yager)
	0–3	27:40 – Yager (Price, Benson)
	0–4	29:14 – Howe (Rehkopf, Cristall)
	0–5	33:18 – Heidt (Barlow, Rehkopf)
	0–6	39:24 – Allen (Cristall, Wood)
	0–7	44:09 – Heidt (Barkey)
	0–8	44:40 – Gauthier (Benson, Molendyk)
	0–9	49:21 – pp – Molendyk (Yager, Ritchie)
Císar – 56:21	1–9

18 min
Penalties
14 min
20
Shots
65

3 August; 15:00	Slovakia	3–2 OT (1–1, 1–1, 0–0); OT: (1–0)	Switzerland	Peavey Mart Centrium

Samuel Urban
Goalies
Ewan Huet

Jenčko (Baran, Molnár) – 11:30	1–0
	1–1	15:15 – Zürcher
	1–2	33:12 – pp – R. Meier (Braillard, S. Meier)
Cedzo (Chromiak, Molnár) – pp – 34:27	2–2
Cedzo (Dej) – 61:53	3–2

14 min
Penalties
10 min
31
Shots
35

3 August; 19:00	Canada	3–0 (1–0, 2–0, 0–0)	Sweden	Peavey Mart Centrium

Scott Ratzlaff
Goalies
Eric Olsson

Ritchie (Cataford, MacKinnon) – 3:29	1–0
Benson (Gauthier, Yager) – 30:55	2–0
Yager (Ritchie, Cristall) – pp – 37:05	3–0

=== Group B ===
Pos	Team	Pld	W	OTW	OTL	L	GF	GA	GD	Pts	Qualification
1	Czech Republic	3	2	1	0	0	14	6	+8	8	Semifinals
2	Finland	3	2	0	1	0	11	6	+5	7	Semifinals
3	United States	3	1	0	0	2	10	8	+2	3	Fifth place game
4	Germany	3	0	0	0	3	4	19	−15	0	Seventh place game

Source: hlinkagretzkycup.ca

31 July; 11:00	Czech Republic	4–3 GWS (1–0, 1–1, 1–2); OT: (0–0); SO: (1–0)	Finland	Peavey Mart Centrium

Michael Hrabal
Goalies
Petteri Rimpinen

Stancl (Sprynar) – sh – 2:36	1–0
Zidlicky (Petr, Rocak) – 28:04	2–0
	2–1	36:38 – pp – Haittunen (Kiviharju, Kumpulainen)
	2–2	41:28 – Kangas (Hynninen)
	2–3	50:29 – Saarelainen (Kumpulainen, Muhonen)
Stancl (Matějíček, Koci) – 59:27	3–3

Csabi (miss)
Šalé
Petr
Sprynar
Stancl (miss)
Sale
Shootout
Saarelainen
(miss) Halttunen
Kiviharju
(miss) Kiiskinen
Jarventie
(miss) Kiviharju
8 min
Penalties
4 min
22
Shots
36

31 July; 15:00	United States	8–1 (2–0, 3–1, 3–0)	Germany	Peavey Mart Centrium

Calvin Vachon
Goalies
Nico Pertuch
Dean Doge

Whitelaw – 5:07	1–0
Terrance (Musty, Adams) – 7:25	2–0
Connor (Whitelaw, Strathmann) – pp – 20:38	3–0
Gramer (Kinsman, Erdman) – 23:57	4–0
	4–1	28:52 – sh – Schäfer (Bicker)
McDonough – 33:03	5–1
Strathmann (Lacroix) – 40:52	6–1
Erdman (Connor, Sharp) – 47:53	7–1
Whitelaw (Strathmann, Lacroix) – pp – 56:53	8–1

8 min
Penalties
12 min
49
Shots
15

1 August; 15:00	Finland	4–1 (1–1, 2–0, 1–0)	United States	Peavey Mart Centrium

Eemil Vinni
Goalies
Calvin Vachon

	0–1	2:53 – pp – Musty (St. Louis, McCarthy)
Jarventie (Alasiurua, Uronen) – 8:05	1–1
Eliseev (Leppa) – 27:57	2–1
Uronen (Jarventie, Kiviharju) – pp – 35:44	3–1
Uronen (Jarventie, Kangas) – 51:44	4–1

8 min
Penalties
14 min
23
Shots
31

1 August; 19:00	Germany	2–7 (1–3, 0–4, 1–0)	Czech Republic	Peavey Mart Centrium

Leon Willerscheid
Dean Doge
Goalies
Adam Dybal

	0–1	00:41 – Šalé (Badinka, Koci)
Samanski (Niehus, Schäfer) – 00:52	1–1
	1–2	2:53 – Petr (Eichler)
	1–3	10:05 – Koci (Kucera, Klíma)
	1–4	23:37 – Šalé (Koci)
	1–5	26:11 – Šalé (Dvorak, Matějíček)
	1–6	38:09 – pp – Fabry (Šalé, Petr)
	1–7	38:15 – Csabi
Schäfer (Bicker, Niehus) – pp – 40:15	2–7

8 min
Penalties
8 min
24
Shots
32

2 August; 15:00	Finland	4–1 (2–0, 2–0, 0–1)	Germany	Peavey Mart Centrium

Eemil Vinni
Goalies
Dean Doge

Kumpulainen (Halttunen, Kiviharju) – pp – 3:35	1–0
Jarventie (Junkkari, Kiviharju) – 8:47	2–0
Ylitalo (Lind, Leppa) – 28:10	3–0
Kliskinen (Kiviharju, Hynninen) – 32:22	4–0
	4–1	40:11 – Bicker (Schäfer)

6 min
Penalties
8 min
39
Shots
16

3 August; 11:00	United States	1–3 (0–0, 0–1, 1–2)	Czech Republic	Peavey Mart Centrium

Hampton Slukynsky
Goalies
Michael Hrabal

	0–1	21:57 – Kucera (Csabi)
	0–2	44:07 – Sprynar (Šalé)
Adams (Musty, Terrance) – 45:05	1–2
	1–3	54:40 – en/sh – Dvorak

10 min
Penalties
10 min
35
Shots
20

== Final round ==
=== Bracket ===
Semifinals
5 August
A1 Canada	4
B2 Finland	1
5 August
B1 Czech Republic	2
A2 Sweden	6

Final
6 August
W1 Canada	4
W2 Sweden	1
Third place
6 August
L1 Finland	3
L2 Czech Republic	1

=== Seventh place game ===
5 August; 10:00	Switzerland	4–1 (2–0, 1–0, 1–1)	Germany	Peavey Mart Centrium

Diego Simeoni
Goalies
Nico Pertuch
Dean Doge

Braillard (Meier, Pedrazzini) – 15:47	1–0
Braillard – 17:54	2–0
Etique (Horak, Embacher) – 36:58	3–0
	3–1	43:06 – Schäfer (Hense, Bicker)
Zurcher (Lichtensteiger) – en – 58:16	4–1

4 min
Penalties
8 min
38
Shots
23

=== Fifth place game ===
5 August; 13:30	Slovakia	2–4 (1–2, 0–1, 1–1)	United States	Peavey Mart Centrium

Samuel Urban
Goalies
Hampton Slukynsky

Baran (Maruna, Rohaľ) – 05:00	1–0
	1–1	15:56 – Connor (Gramer, Erdman)
	1–2	18:46 – pp – Strathmann (Lacroix, Whitelaw)
	1–3	23:39 – pp – Adams (St. Louis, Musty)
	1–4	42:09 – Sharp (Musty, Terrance)
Pekarčík (Urban) – 45:44	2–4

14 min
Penalties
12 min
35
Shots
36

=== Semifinals ===
5 August; 17:00	Canada	4–1 (1–0, 1–0, 2–1)	Finland	Peavey Mart Centrium

Scott Ratzlaff
Goalies
Eemil Vinni

Gauthier (Price, Allen) – 19:43	1–0
Ritchie (Rehkopf, Weinstein) – 28:54	2–0
Wood – 49:29	3–0
Barkey (Cristall, Howe) – 49:48	4–0
	4–1	59:42 – Alasiurua (Kliskinen, Hynninen)

8 min
Penalties
4 min
27
Shots
24

5 August; 20:30	Czech Republic	2–6 (0–1, 1–2, 1–3)	Sweden	Peavey Mart Centrium

Michael Hrabal
Goalies
Noah Erliden

	0–1	17:51 – Forsfjäll (Sandin Pellikka, Lindstein)
	0–2	23:26 – Nordh (Kangas, Sandin Pellikka)
Stancl (Badinka, Sprynar) – 32:56	1–2
	1–3	38:46 – Nilsson (Edstrom, Sagadin)
Felcman (Kucera) – 45:47	2–3
	2–4	56:44 – Stenberg (Bergström, Willander)
	2–5	59:05 – en – Johansson
	2–6	59:55 – Stenberg (Edstrom)

6 min
Penalties
10 min
30
Shots
39

=== Bronze medal game ===
6 August; 12:00	Finland	3–1 (1–1, 1–0, 1–0)	Czech Republic	Peavey Mart Centrium

Eemil Vinni
Goalies
Michael Hrabal

Kiviharju (Nurmi, Kliskinen) – 15:17	1–0
	1–1	19:35 – Šalé (Petr, Stancl)
Alasiurua (Halttunen, Jarventie) – 26:31	2–1
Kilskinen (Uronen) – en – 59:18	3–1

2 min
Penalties
2 min
25
Shots
22

=== Final ===
6 August; 16:00	Canada	4–1 (2–1, 1–0, 1–0)	Sweden	Peavey Mart Centrium

Scott Ratzlaff
Goalies
Noah Erliden

Howe (Barlow) – 5:49	1–0
	1–1	11:57 – Pettersson (Nilsson)
Gauthier (Heidt, Allen) – pp – 14:15	2–1
Ritchie (Heidt) – 25:54	3–1
Yager (Benson) – 55:56	4–1

8 min
Penalties
8 min
36
Shots
26

== Final standings ==
Rank	Team
1st place, gold medalist(s)	Canada
2nd place, silver medalist(s)	Sweden
3rd place, bronze medalist(s)	Finland
4	Czech Republic
5	United States
6	Slovakia
7	Switzerland
8	Germany

== Statistics ==
=== Scoring leaders ===
Pos	Player	Country	GP	G	A	Pts	PIM
1	Calum Ritchie	Canada	5	4	6	10	2
2	Otto Stenberg	Sweden	5	5	4	9	0
2	Brayden Yager	Canada	5	5	4	9	0
4	Ethan Gauthier	Canada	5	6	1	7	4
5	Zach Benson	Canada	5	2	5	7	2
6	Cameron Allen	Canada	5	1	6	7	10
7	Eduard Sale	Czech Republic	5	4	2	6	0
8	Riley Heidt	Canada	5	3	3	6	0
9	Andrew Cristall	Canada	5	1	5	6	6
9	Aron Kiviharju	Finland	5	1	5	6	0
9	Theo Lindstein	Sweden	5	1	5	6	0

GP = Games played; G = Goals; A = Assists; Pts = Points; +/− = Plus–minus; PIM = Penalties In Minutes
