= Tanner Molendyk =

Canadian ice hockey player (born 2005)

- Born: February 3, 2005 (age 21) McBride, British Columbia, Canada
- Height: 5 ft 11 in (180 cm)
- Weight: 190 lb (86 kg; 13 st 8 lb)
- Position: Defence
- Shoots: Left
- NHL team (P) Cur. team: Nashville Predators; Milwaukee Admirals (AHL)
- NHL draft: 24th overall, 2023; Nashville Predators
- Playing career: 2025–present

Tanner Molendyk (born February 3, 2005) is a Canadian professional ice hockey defenceman for the Milwaukee Admirals in the American Hockey League (AHL) while under contract as a prospect to the Nashville Predators of the National Hockey League (NHL). He was drafted in the first round, 24th overall, by the Predators in the 2023 NHL entry draft.

== Playing career ==
During the 2022–23 season, Molendyk recorded nine goals and 28 assists in 67 games for the Saskatoon Blades. During the playoffs, he recorded three goals and five assists in 18 games, and helped the Blades advance to the Eastern Conference finals. He shared the lead for goals and finished second in points and assists among WHL defencemen in the playoffs.

On July 6, 2023, Molendyk was signed to a three-year, entry-level contract with the Nashville Predators.

On January 6, 2025, Molendyk, along with Misha Volotovskii, was traded to the Medicine Hat Tigers in exchange for two players and five draft picks. He immediately assumed a major role in Medicine Hat's defence corps in the regular season, and continuing into their deep run in the playoffs. The team ultimately reached the WHL Finals, where they defeated the Spokane Chiefs to claim the Ed Chynoweth Cup as league champions. While playing with the Tigers, Molendyk had 5 goals and 21 assists in 28 regular season games and 4 goals and 16 assists in 18 postseason games.

== International play ==
Medal record

Representing Canada

Ice hockey

Hlinka Gretzky Cup
Gold medal – first place	2022 Canada	

Molendyk first represented Canada at the 2022 Hlinka Gretzky Cup, where he recorded one goal and three assists in five games and won a gold medal. In 2023, he was named to Team Canada's roster for the 2024 World Junior Championship; however, he sustained a wrist injury in a pre-tournament game that ultimately held him out of the tournament. He was later able to join Team Canada for the 2025 edition, and was named an alternate captain.

== Career statistics ==
=== Regular season and playoffs ===
			Regular season					Playoffs
Season	Team	League	GP	G	A	Pts	PIM	GP	G	A	Pts	PIM
2020–21	Saskatoon Blades	WHL	17	0	2	2	2	—	—	—	—	—
2021–22	Saskatoon Blades	WHL	55	3	15	18	16	5	0	3	3	0
2022–23	Saskatoon Blades	WHL	67	9	28	37	37	18	3	5	8	0
2023–24	Saskatoon Blades	WHL	50	10	46	56	18	16	3	7	10	10
2024–25	Saskatoon Blades	WHL	21	4	17	21	10	—	—	—	—	—
2024–25	Medicine Hat Tigers	WHL	28	5	21	26	8	18	4	16	20	4
2025–26	Milwaukee Admirals	AHL	60	4	19	23	14	3	0	1	1	0
AHL totals			60	4	19	23	14	3	0	1	1	0

=== International ===
Year	Team	Event	Result	GP	G	A	Pts	PIM
2022	Canada	HG18	1st place, gold medalist(s)	5	1	3	4	0
2025	Canada	WJC	5th	5	0	2	2	4
Junior totals				10	1	5	6	4

== Awards and honours ==
Award	Year	Ref
CHL
Memorial Cup All-Star Team	2025	
WHL
Ed Chynoweth Cup champion	2025	

Awards and achievements
Preceded by Matthew Wood	Nashville Predators first-round draft pick 2023	Succeeded by Yegor Surin
