= Charlie Stramel =

American ice hockey player (born 2004)

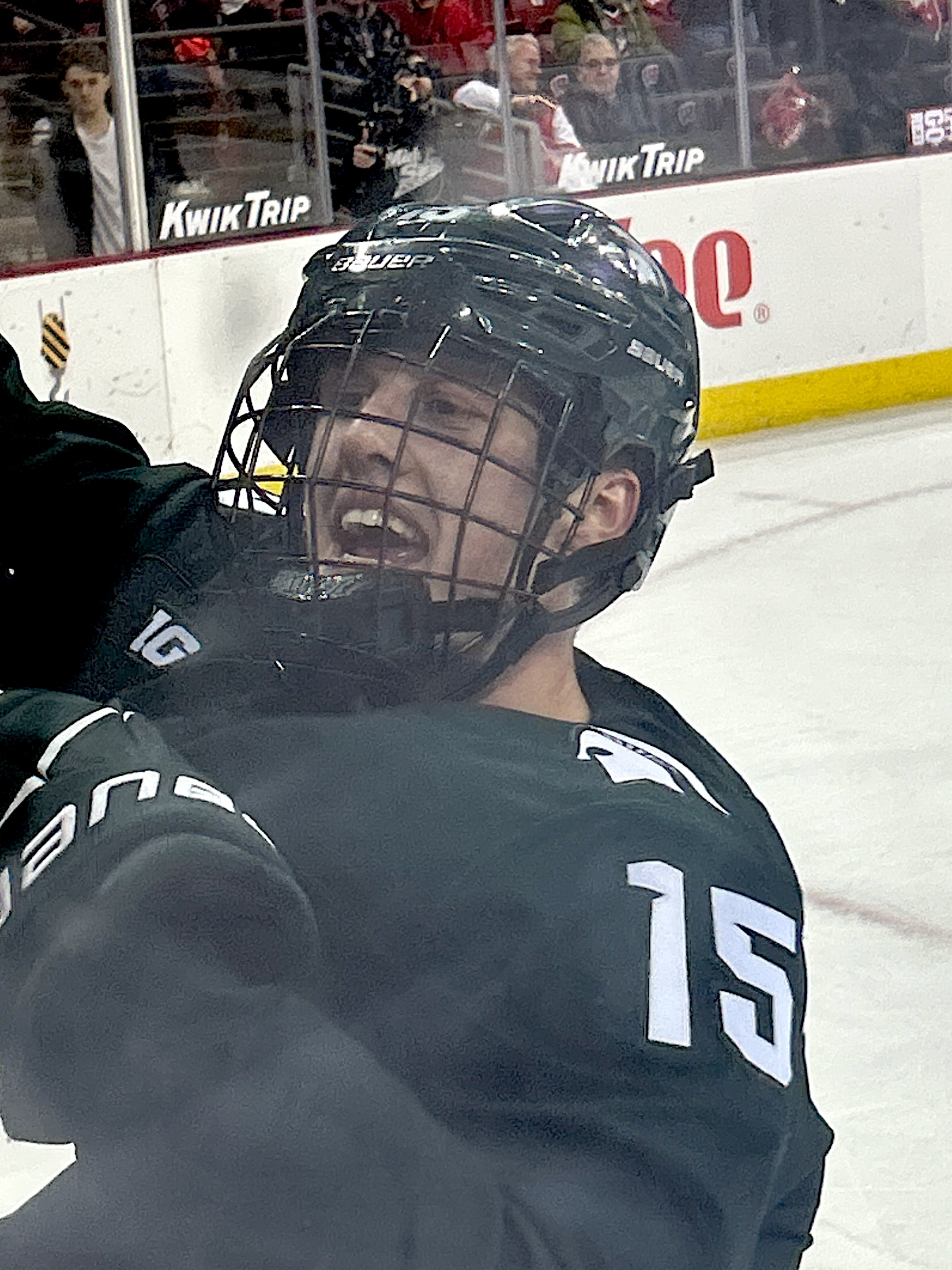
- Stramel with Michigan State in December 2024
- Born: October 15, 2004 (age 22) Rosemount, Minnesota, U.S.
- Height: 6 ft 3 in (191 cm)
- Weight: 212 lb (96 kg; 15 st 2 lb)
- Position: Center
- Shoots: Right
- NHL team (P) Cur. team: Minnesota Wild; Iowa Wild (AHL)
- NHL draft: 21st overall, 2023; Minnesota Wild
- Playing career: 2026–present

Charlie Stramel (born October 15, 2004) is an American professional ice hockey forward who plays for the Iowa Wild in the American Hockey League (AHL) while under contract as a prospect to the Minnesota Wild of the National Hockey League (NHL). He formerly played in the NCAA for the University of Wisconsin and Michigan State University. Stramel was selected 21st overall by the Wild in the 2023 NHL entry draft.

== Playing career ==
Stramel started his college ice hockey career at Wisconsin. In his freshman season (2022–23), he tallied five goals and seven assists across 33 games. The following year, his sophomore season (2023–24), he contributed three goals and five assists in 34 games.

On April 8, 2024, Stramel made the move to Michigan State. In his junior season during the 2024–25 campaign, he tallied nine goals and 18 assists over 37 games.

== International play ==
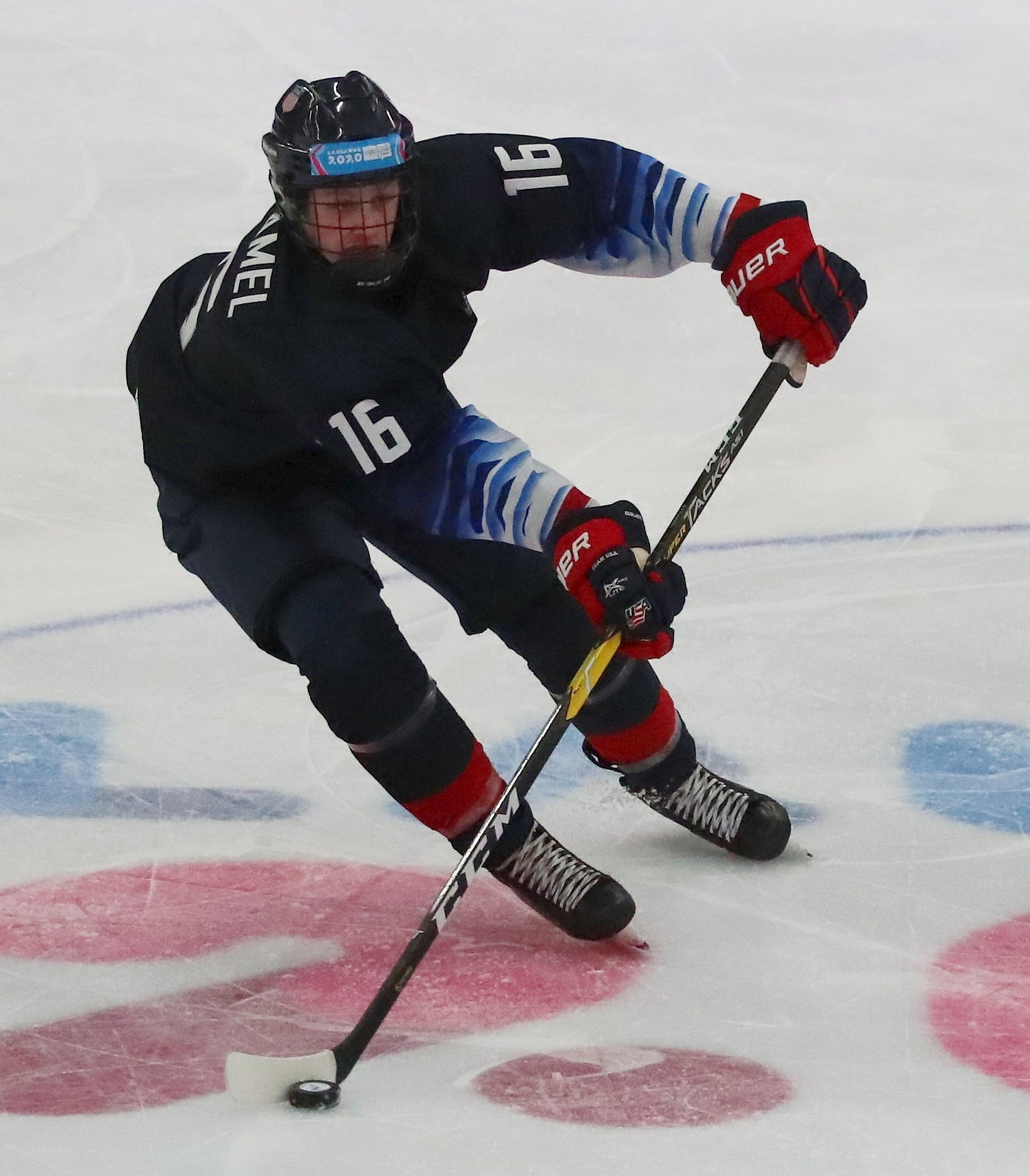
- Stramel at the 2020 Winter Youth Olympics

Medal record

Representing United States

Ice hockey

World Junior Championships
Bronze medal – third place	2023 Canada	

World U18 Championships
Silver medal – second place	2022 Germany	

At the 2020 Winter Youth Olympics, Stramel represented the United States on the international stage. Throughout the event, he made a significant impact on the ice, contributing offensively by scoring two goals throughout four games. Stramel's efforts helped propel Team USA to the championship game, where they ultimately secured the silver medal, marking a memorable achievement early in his international playing career.

Stramel played for the United States at the 2022 IIHF World U18 Championships, tallying two goals and three assists across six games and helping the team earn a silver medal.

On December 12, 2022, Stramel was selected to join the United States men's national junior ice hockey team for the 2023 World Junior Ice Hockey Championships. Throughout the tournament, he contributed three assists over seven games and helped secure a bronze medal.

== Career statistics ==
=== Regular season and playoffs ===
			Regular season					Playoffs
Season	Team	League	GP	G	A	Pts	PIM	GP	G	A	Pts	PIM
2020–21	U.S. National Development Team	USHL	AHL	1	7	8	24	—	—	—	—	—
2021–22	U.S. National Development Team	USHL	16	7	8	15	25	—	—	—	—	—
2022–23	University of Wisconsin	B1G	33	5	7	12	59	—	—	—	—	—
2023–24	University of Wisconsin	B1G	34	3	5	8	20	—	—	—	—	—
2024–25	Michigan State University	B1G	37	9	18	27	26	—	—	—	—	—
2025–26	Michigan State University	B1G	37	19	25	44	32	—	—	—	—	—
2026-27	Iowa Wild	AHL
NCAA totals			141	36	55	91	137	—	—	—	—	—

=== International ===
Year	Team	Event	Result	GP	G	A	Pts	PIM
2021	United States	U18	5th	5	2	2	4	6
2022	United States	U18	2nd place, silver medalist(s)	6	2	3	5	8
2022	United States	WJC	5th	1	0	1	1	2
2023	United States	WJC	3rd place, bronze medalist(s)	7	0	3	3	4
Junior totals				19	4	9	13	20

== Awards and honours ==
Award	Year	Ref
College
All-Big Ten First Team	2026	
AHCA West Second Team All-American	2026	

Awards and achievements
Preceded by Danila Yurov	Minnesota Wild first-round draft pick 2023	Succeeded by Zeev Buium
