= Zach Benson =

Canadian ice hockey player (born 2005)

Zachary Benson
- Born: May 12, 2005 (age 21) Chilliwack, British Columbia, Canada
- Height: 5 ft 10 in (178 cm)
- Weight: 177 lb (80 kg; 12 st 9 lb)
- Position: Winger
- Shoots: Left
- NHL team: Buffalo Sabres
- NHL draft: 13th overall, 2023; Buffalo Sabres
- Playing career: 2023–present

Zachary Ruben Benson (born May 12, 2005) is a Canadian professional ice hockey player who is a winger for the Buffalo Sabres of the National Hockey League (NHL). He was drafted 13th overall by the Sabres in the 2023 NHL entry draft.

== Early life ==
Benson was born May 12, 2005, in Chilliwack, British Columbia, to Darcy and Jaclyn Benson. His family owns a traveling carnival, and Benson spent his childhood assisting his parents at carnivals across western Canada. He played minor ice hockey in Chilliwack before transferring to Yale Hockey Academy in 2018. In his first season with the Canadian Sport School Hockey League (CSSHL), Benson recorded six goals and 19 points in 28 regular season games, with an additional four points in five postseason games. During the 2019–20 season, Benson scored 30 goals and recorded 86 points in 30 games for Yale, and he was named the CSSHL most valuable player.

== Playing career ==
=== Junior ===
The Winnipeg Ice of the Western Hockey League (WHL) selected Benson 14th overall in the 2020 WHL Bantam Draft, and he signed with the team on April 29. Due to the impacts of the COVID-19 pandemic on youth ice hockey, Benson was allowed to play in the 2020–21 WHL season as a 15-year-old. He made an immediate impact, with three goals and seven points in his first nine junior ice hockey games.

Benson finished third in WHL scoring in 2022–23 with 36 goals and 98 points in 60 games, behind fellow BC-born prospect Connor Bedard.

=== Professional ===
Drafted 13th overall by the Buffalo Sabres in the 2023 NHL entry draft, Benson signed a three-year entry-level contract on July 28, 2023. On October 12, Benson made his NHL debut against the New York Rangers, where he logged a minor penalty in a 5–1 loss. On November 22, Benson scored his first career goal in a 3–4 overtime loss to the Washington Capitals.

Benson experienced a breakout in the later part of the 2025–26 season, becoming one of the NHL's most effective pests; his teammates dubbed him "The Rat" for his aggressive play. He scored his first playoff goal on April 26 during Game 4 of the Sabres' first round series against the Boston Bruins during the 2026 Stanley Cup playoffs. On his 21st birthday, he scored a game-winning goal in Game 4 of the Sabres' second round series against the Montreal Canadiens.

Benson signed a seven-year, $52.5 million contract extension with the Sabres on June 24, 2026.

== International play ==
At the 2022 Hlinka Gretzky Cup, Benson had two goals and five assists in five games, helping Canada win gold.

== Career statistics ==
=== Regular season and playoffs ===
| | | | Regular season | | | | | Playoffs |
| Season | Team | League | GP | G | A | Pts | PIM | GP | G | A | Pts | PIM |
|---|---|---|---|---|---|---|---|---|---|---|---|---|
| 2020–21 | Winnipeg Ice | WHL | 24 | 10 | 10 | 20 | 12 | — | — | — | — | — |
| 2021–22 | Winnipeg Ice | WHL | 58 | 25 | 38 | 63 | 28 | 15 | 9 | 14 | 23 | 10 |
| 2022–23 | Winnipeg Ice | WHL | 60 | 36 | 62 | 98 | 49 | 15 | 7 | 10 | 17 | 8 |
| 2023–24 | Buffalo Sabres | NHL | 71 | 11 | 19 | 30 | 36 | — | — | — | — | — |
| 2024–25 | Buffalo Sabres | NHL | 75 | 10 | 18 | 28 | 60 | — | — | — | — | — |
| 2025–26 | Buffalo Sabres | NHL | 65 | 13 | 30 | 43 | 42 | 13 | 5 | 4 | 9 | 64 |
| NHL totals | | | 211 | 34 | 67 | 101 | 138 | 13 | 5 | 4 | 9 | 64 |

=== International ===
| Year | Team | Event | Result | GP | G | A | Pts | PIM |
|---|---|---|---|---|---|---|---|---|
| 2022 | Canada | HG18 | 1st place, gold medalist(s) | 5 | 2 | 5 | 7 | 2 |
| Junior totals | | | | 5 | 2 | 5 | 7 | 2 |

== Awards and honours ==
| Award | Year |
WHL
| East First All-Star Team | 2023 |
| CHL Third All-Star Team | 2023 |

Awards and achievements
| Preceded by Jiří Kulich | Buffalo Sabres first-round draft pick 2023 | Succeeded by Konsta Helenius |
