= Shane Wright =

Canadian ice hockey player (born 2004)

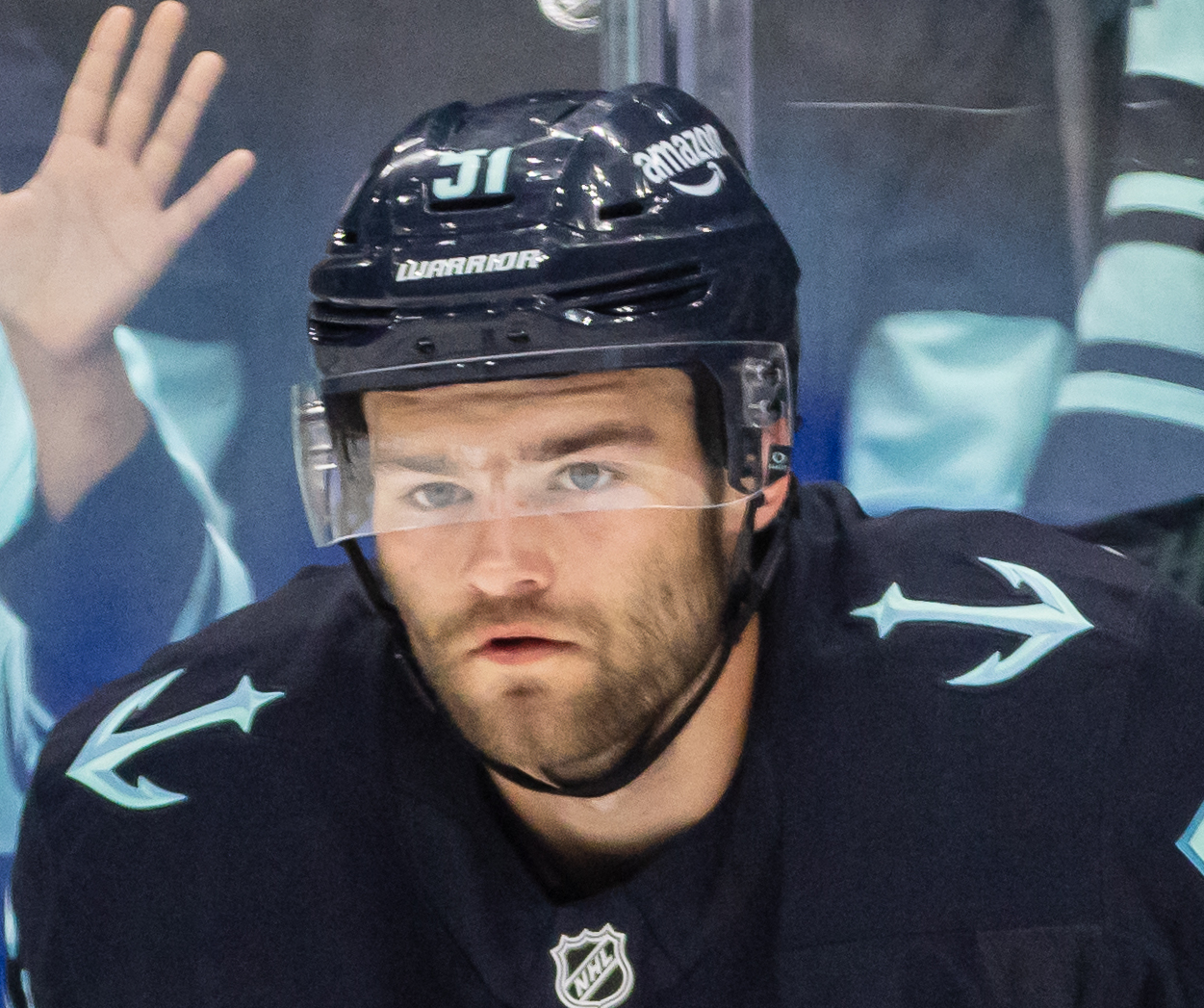
- Wright with the Seattle Kraken in 2024
- Born: January 5, 2004 (age 22) Burlington, Ontario, Canada
- Height: 6 ft 1 in (185 cm)
- Weight: 192 lb (87 kg; 13 st 10 lb)
- Position: Centre
- Shoots: Right
- NHL team Former teams: Nashville Predators; Seattle Kraken
- NHL draft: 4th overall, 2022; Seattle Kraken
- Playing career: 2022–present

Shane Wright (born January 5, 2004) is a Canadian professional ice hockey player who is a centre for the Nashville Predators of the National Hockey League (NHL). He was selected fourth overall in the 2022 NHL entry draft by the Seattle Kraken.

Internationally, Wright won gold medals as a member of Canada's under-18 team at the 2021 World U18 Championships and junior team at the 2023 World Junior Championships.

== Playing career ==
=== Amateur ===
==== Kingston Frontenacs (2019–2023) ====
Wright was granted exceptional player status for the 2019–20 OHL season, becoming the sixth player to be granted exceptional status. The preceding five players were John Tavares, Aaron Ekblad, Connor McDavid, Sean Day and Joe Veleno.

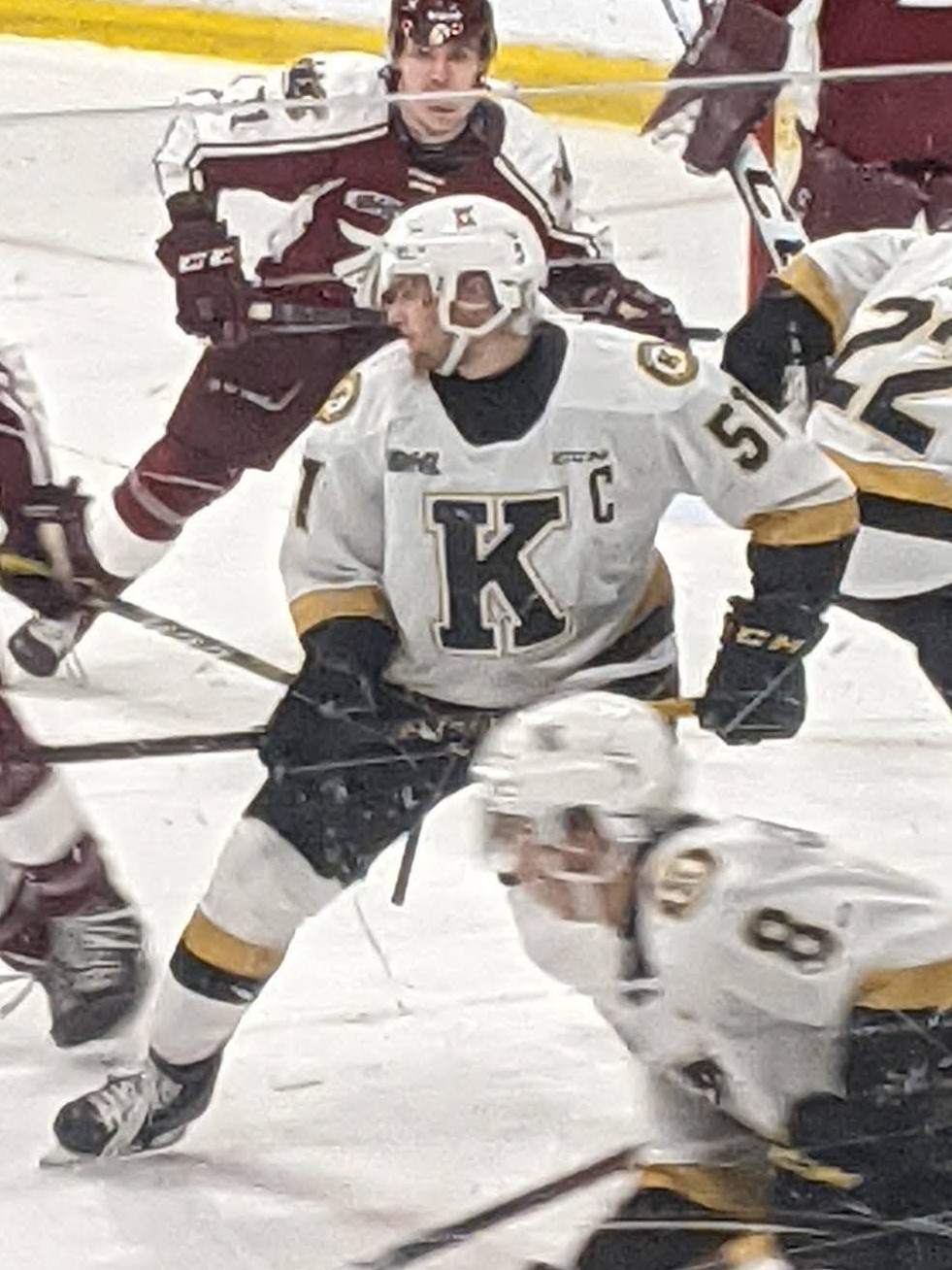
Shane Wright during his time as captain of the Kingston Frontenacs in 2021.

Wright was drafted by the Kingston Frontenacs with the first overall selection in the 2019 OHL Priority Selection. On September 20, 2019, Wright made his Ontario Hockey League (OHL) debut at the age of 15, as he was held to no points in a 4–1 loss to the Oshawa Generals. One week later, on September 27, Wright scored the first OHL goal against Andrew MacLean of the Oshawa Generals in a 4–1 loss. On October 4, Wright had his first multi-point game in his OHL career, scoring a goal and adding an assist in an 8–4 loss to the Niagara IceDogs. Wright recorded his first multi-goal game on October 11, as he scored twice, including the overtime-winning goal, in a 4–3 victory over the Niagara IceDogs. On December 30, the Frontenacs named Wright an alternate captain of the team, as he became the youngest team captain in Canadian Hockey League (CHL) history. On February 29, 2020, Wright recorded his first OHL hat trick, as he scored three goals and added an assist for a career-high four points in a 6–1 win over the Flint Firebirds. Wright finished the 2019–20 season with 39 goals and 66 points in 58 games. After the season he was named the winner of the Emms Family Award as OHL rookie of the year.

Due to the COVID-19 pandemic, the 2020–21 season was cancelled, leaving Wright without a league to play in. His only competitive ice hockey in that span was an appearance at the 2021 World U18 Championships.

Wright returned to the Frontenacs for the 2021–22 season. On October 8, 2021, he was named captain of the team, making him the youngest captain in OHL history. Expectations were high based on his rookie season, his performance internationally, and his presumptive status as the first overall pick in the NHL entry draft, but the season began with only 22 points in 19 games in his first two months. Many attributed this in part to the loss of the prior OHL season. However, he was widely credited with taking major strides in performance for the remainder. Wright finished the regular season with 32 goals and 62 assists, the former less than in his debut season, the latter a significant increase. The Frontenacs qualified for the OHL playoffs, and faced the Oshawa Generals in the first round. Wright scored the series-winning goal in overtime of game six to eliminate the Generals and advance to the second round. The Frontenacs were eliminated by the North Bay Battalion in the second round, concluding his season.

After spending the fall of 2022 playing variously in the NHL, the AHL, and the 2023 World Junior Championships, Wright was sent back to the OHL by the Kraken management for the second half of the 2022–23 season. With the Frontenacs not considered to be a competitive team, it was widely speculated that he would soon be traded to another team in advance of the OHL's trade deadline for the OHL playoffs, with teams such as the Ottawa 67's, London Knights, Barrie Colts, and Peterborough Petes rumoured to be interested.

==== Windsor Spitfires (2023) ====
Despite rumours that placed the London Knights as frontrunners to secure Wright in trade, on January 9, 2023, he was traded to the Windsor Spitfires in exchange for Ethan Miedema, Gavin McCarthy, five draft picks, and two additional conditional draft picks. This trade was the last of a series of transactions by the Spitfires, the defending OHL Western Conference champions, in advance of the 2023 playoffs. Windsor general manager Bill Bowler said that "anytime you get the captain of the gold-medal winning Team Canada junior team is a great day for the organization and the City of Windsor."

Wright played 20 games in the regular season, notching 15 goals and 22 assists, while the Spitfires finished first in the Western Conference and entered their first round playoff series against the Kitchener Rangers as the top seed. Wright managed one goal and two assists in four playoff games, before the Spitfires were upset in a sweep by the Rangers.

=== Professional ===
==== 2022 NHL entry draft ====
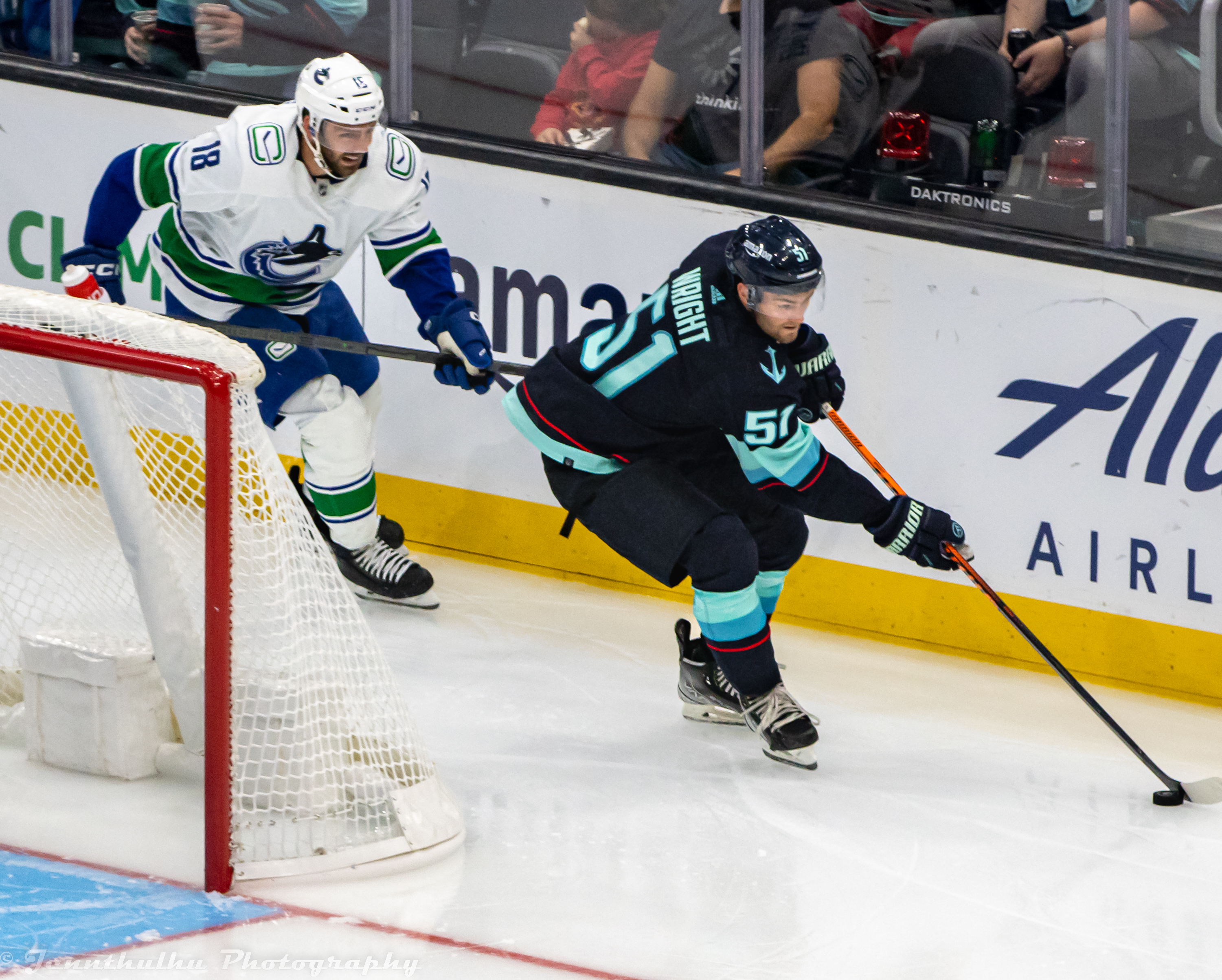
Wright during a preseason game against the Vancouver Canucks in October 2022.

Considered the presumptive first overall pick in the 2022 NHL entry draft at the start of the season, Wright's status began to be called into question by the midpoint of the 2021–22 season, with many scouts saying that he had "left the door open for someone to unseat him." As the draft approached, debate largely focused on the merits of Wright versus Slovak winger Juraj Slafkovský of Liiga's TPS. The first overall pick was won by the Montreal Canadiens, whose general manager, Kent Hughes, confirmed days before the draft that the choice was between Wright, Slafkovský, and Logan Cooley of the USA Hockey National Team Development Program (USNTDP). Ultimately the Canadiens used the first overall pick to select Slafkovský, the New Jersey Devils selected Šimon Nemec second and the Arizona Coyotes selected Cooley third, giving the Seattle Kraken an opportunity to draft Wright with the fourth overall pick. He remarked afterward that he was "definitely gonna have a chip on my shoulder" as to being passed over by the first three teams.

==== Seattle Kraken (2022–2026) ====
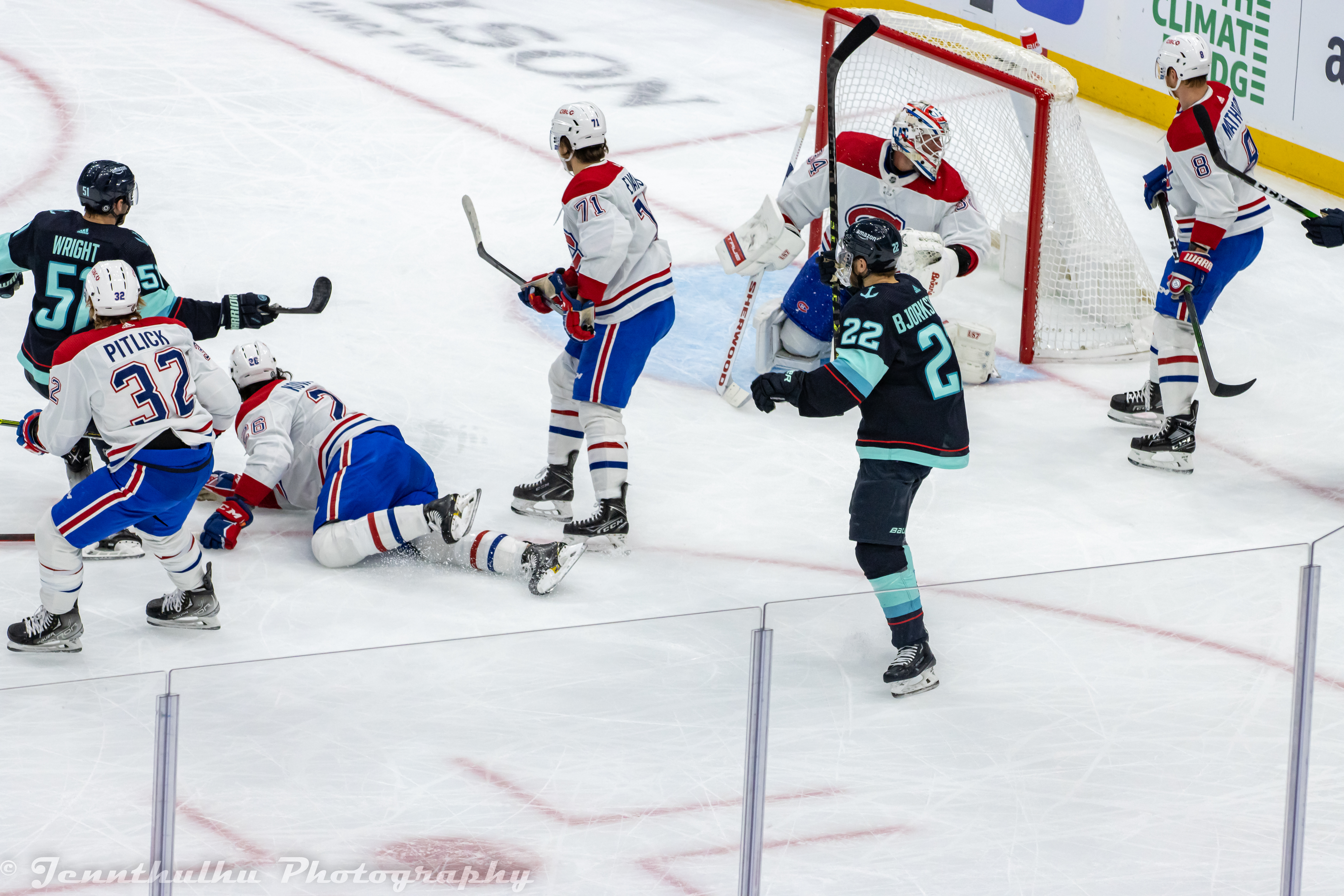
Wright (left) scoring his first NHL goal on Jake Allen of the Montreal Canadiens.

On July 13, 2022, Wright signed a three-year, entry-level contract with the Kraken worth $2.85 million over three years. Kraken's general manager Ron Francis stated that he believed Wright would likely play the season with the Kraken. He played 6:14 minutes in his NHL debut on October 12, in a 5–4 overtime loss to the Anaheim Ducks. Following his debut, Wright was a healthy scratch for the following two games before returning to the lineup on October 17. Two days later, he recorded his first NHL point, an assist, in 4–3 overtime loss to the St. Louis Blues. As October concluded, head coach Dave Hakstol's usage of Wright became a major source of debate in the media and among fans, as he was frequently scratched and being played for less than seven minutes per game on average when allowed into the lineup. Following five straight games as a healthy scratch, the Kraken exploited a loophole in league rules to send Wright to their American Hockey League (AHL) affiliate, the Coachella Valley Firebirds, on a conditioning stint. This bypassed the requirement Wright be returned to major junior level. After scoring four goals in five AHL games, he returned to the Kraken lineup on December 6, scoring his first NHL goal in a 4–2 loss against the Canadiens, a result widely called "poetic." After spending time competing with Canada junior team, the Kraken returned Wright to the OHL. In April 2023, Wright was re-assigned to the Firebirds after the Windsor Spitfires were eliminated from the OHL playoffs. He participated in the Firebirds' deep run to the finals of the 2023 Calder Cup playoffs, where they lost to the Hershey Bears in seven games. Wright recorded two goals and seven assists in 24 AHL playoff games.

His second season with the Firebirds, where the team again lost the final to the Bears, had Wright named to the 2023–24 AHL Top Prospects Team, with 22 goals and 25 assists in 59 games, even if he could only play in half of the playoffs due to an injury. During his first full season with the Kraken in 2024–25, Wright scored 19 goals and 44 points in 79 games.

==== Nashville Predators (2026–present) ====
On November 1, 2026, Wright was traded to the Nashville Predators in exchange for Matthew Wood.

== International play ==
Medal record

Men's ice hockey

Representing Canada

World Junior Championships
Gold medal – first place	2023 Canada	

World U18 Championships
Gold medal – first place	2021 United States	

Wright made his international debut with Canada under-18 team at the 2021 World U18 Championships, finishing second in the tournament scoring race and scoring two goals in the final against Russia under-18 team to help win the gold medal. Later in the year he was selected for Canada junior team for the 2022 World Junior Championships, but was only able to play two games before the tournament was cancelled due to the COVID-19 pandemic. Wright expressed "shock and disappointment". Wright did not play in the rescheduled event that was held in August 2022.

Wright was loaned by the Seattle Kraken to Canada junior team in advance of the 2023 World Junior Championships. On December 18, 2022, he was named captain of the team for the tournament, which he called a "true honour." During the tournament he recorded four goals and three assists in seven games, winning a gold medal with the team. He was widely praised for his performance in the gold medal game against Czech junior team, which occurred on his birthday.

== Career statistics ==
=== Regular season and playoffs ===
			Regular season					Playoffs
Season	Team	League	GP	G	A	Pts	PIM	GP	G	A	Pts	PIM
2019–20	Kingston Frontenacs	OHL	58	39	27	66	10	—	—	—	—	—
2021–22	Kingston Frontenacs	OHL	63	32	62	94	22	11	3	11	14	0
2022–23	Seattle Kraken	NHL	8	1	1	2	2	—	—	—	—	—
2022–23	Coachella Valley Firebirds	AHL	8	4	2	6	2	24	2	7	9	2
2022–23	Windsor Spitfires	OHL	20	15	22	37	6	4	1	2	3	4
2023–24	Coachella Valley Firebirds	AHL	59	22	25	47	18	12	4	9	13	4
2023–24	Seattle Kraken	NHL	8	4	1	5	0	—	—	—	—	—
2024–25	Seattle Kraken	NHL	79	19	25	44	18	—	—	—	—	—
2025–26	Seattle Kraken	NHL	74	12	15	27	10	—	—	—	—	—
2026–27	Seattle Kraken	NHL	14	3	1	4	4	—	—	—	—	—
NHL totals			183	39	43	82	34	—	—	—	—	—

=== International ===
Year	Team	Event	Result	GP	G	A	Pts	PIM
2019	Canada Black	U17	8th	5	4	3	7	14
2021	Canada	U18	1st place, gold medalist(s)	5	9	5	14	2
2023	Canada	WJC	1st place, gold medalist(s)	7	4	3	7	0
Junior totals				17	17	11	28	16

== Awards and honours ==
Award	Year	Ref
OHL
First All-Rookie Team	2020	
Emms Family Award	2020	
CHL Rookie of the Year	2020	
Third All-Star Team	2022	

Awards and achievements
Preceded by Matty Beniers	Seattle Kraken first-round draft pick 2022	Succeeded by Eduard Šalé
