= Eduard Šalé =

Czech ice hockey player (born 2005)

- Born: 10 March 2005 (age 21) Brno, Czech Republic
- Height: 6 ft 1 in (185 cm)
- Weight: 168 lb (76 kg; 12 st 0 lb)
- Position: Left wing
- Shoots: Left
- NHL team (P) Cur. team Former teams: Seattle Kraken; Coachella Valley Firebirds (AHL); HC Kometa Brno
- NHL draft: 20th overall, 2023; Seattle Kraken
- Playing career: 2021–present

Eduard Šalé (born 10 March 2005) is a Czech professional ice hockey forward for the Coachella Valley Firebirds of the American Hockey League (AHL) as a prospect for the Seattle Kraken of the National Hockey League (NHL). He was drafted 20th overall by the Kraken in the 2023 NHL entry draft.

== Playing career ==
Šalé played as a youth with hometown club HC Kometa Brno, first appearing as a 13-year-old at the under-16 level. During the 2020–21 season, Šalé having appeared with the under-20 team, he briefly left Brno and made seven appearances at the Finnish under-18 SM-sarja competition with Ilves.

Returning to Brno, Šalé made his senior professional debut in the Czech Extraliga during the 2021–22 season, finishing with two goals and three assists in 10 regular season games. Eligible for major junior ice hockey in North America, Šalé was selected in the first round, 29th overall, in the 2022 CHL Import Draft by the Barrie Colts.

Continuing his tenure with Brno, Šalé, in his first full professional season in 2022–23, managed seven goals and seven assists through 43 regular season games.

Touted as a potential first-round pick, he was selected 20th overall by the Seattle Kraken in the 2023 NHL entry draft. He was later signed to a three-year, entry-level contract with the Kraken on 17 July 2023. Šalé started the 2023–24 season with the Colts, although he was eventually traded to the Kitchener Rangers.

== International play ==
Medal record

Representing Czech Republic

Ice hockey

World Junior Championships
Silver medal – second place	2023 Canada	
Bronze medal – third place	2024 Sweden	
Bronze medal – third place	2025 Canada	

Šalé first represented Czech national under-18 team at the 2021 Hlinka Gretzky Cup and in the following year he was recognised as one of the top ranked stars in the 2022 Hlinka Gretzky Cup.

Šalé won a silver medal with the Czech national junior team at the 2023 World Junior Ice Hockey Championships. Šalé won a bronze medal the following year, in a comeback win that saw Team Czechia overcome a 5–2 deficit. At the 2025 World Juniors, in his final year of eligibility, Šalé was chosen as captain of team Czechia. The team went on to win a third consecutive medal and second consecutive bronze, capped off by a record setting 14-round shootout in which Šalé scored in both the 13th and 14th rounds, securing the win.

== Career statistics ==
=== Regular season and playoffs ===
			Regular season					Playoffs
Season	Team	League	GP	G	A	Pts	PIM	GP	G	A	Pts	PIM
2020–21	HC Kometa Brno	Czech U20	8	4	2	6	0	—	—	—	—	—
2021–22	HC Kometa Brno	Czech U20	39	42	47	89	56	5	5	5	10	0
2021–22	HC Kometa Brno	ELH	10	2	1	3	2	—	—	—	—	—
2022–23	HC Kometa Brno	ELH	43	7	7	14	2	6	0	0	0	0
2023–24	Barrie Colts	OHL	25	7	13	20	6	—	—	—	—	—
2023–24	Kitchener Rangers	OHL	24	8	10	18	2	10	5	7	12	8
2024–25	Coachella Valley Firebirds	AHL	51	6	15	21	14	3	0	0	0	0
2025–26	Coachella Valley Firebirds	AHL	58	13	14	27	14	12	2	2	4	4
ELH totals			53	9	8	17	4	6	0	0	0	0

=== International ===
Year	Team	Event	Result	GP	G	A	Pts	PIM
2021	Czech Republic	HG18	6th	4	1	2	3	2
2022	Czech Republic	U18	4th	6	1	8	9	0
2022	Czech Republic	HG18	4th	5	4	2	6	0
2023	Czech Republic	WJC	2nd place, silver medalist(s)	7	1	5	6	2
2024	Czech Republic	WJC	3rd place, bronze medalist(s)	7	3	4	7	0
2025	Czech Republic	WJC	3rd place, bronze medalist(s)	7	6	2	8	4
Junior totals				36	16	23	39	8

Awards and achievements
Preceded by Shane Wright	Seattle Kraken first-round draft pick 2023	Succeeded by Berkly Catton
