= Matthew Wood (ice hockey) =

Canadian ice hockey player (born 2005)

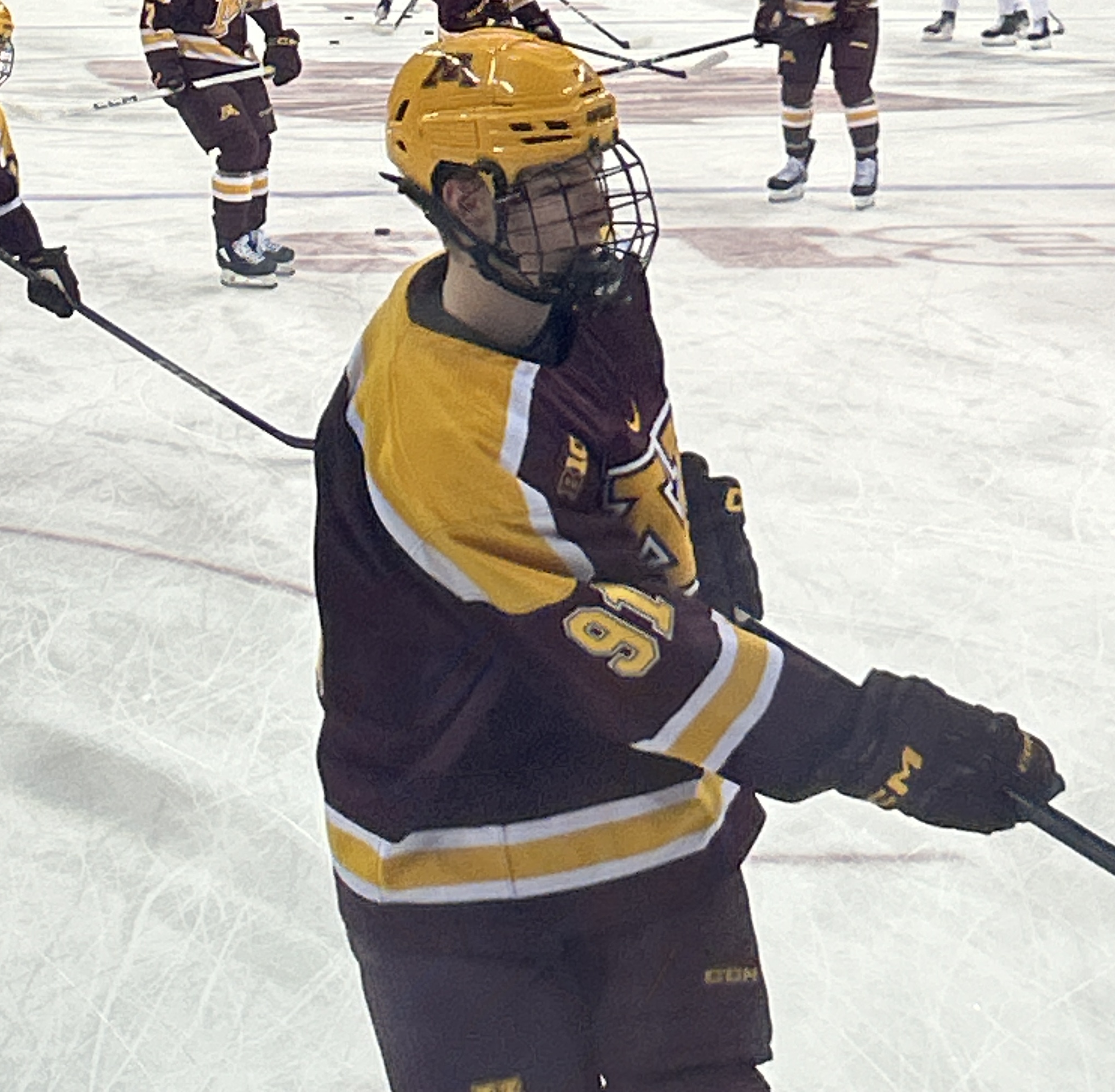
- Wood with Minnesota in November 2024
- Born: February 6, 2005 (age 21) Nanaimo, British Columbia, Canada
- Height: 6 ft 4 in (193 cm)
- Weight: 202 lb (92 kg; 14 st 6 lb)
- Position: Winger
- Shoots: Right
- NHL team Former teams: Seattle Kraken; Nashville Predators
- NHL draft: 15th overall, 2023; Nashville Predators
- Playing career: 2025–present

Matthew Wood (born February 6, 2005) is a Canadian professional ice hockey player who is a winger for the Seattle Kraken of the National Hockey League (NHL). He was selected 15th overall by the Nashville Predators in the 2023 NHL entry draft.

== Playing career ==
Wood was the youngest player in college hockey when he scored 11 goals and 34 points in 35 games playing for the University of Connecticut. He was named to Hockey East's All-Rookie team. During the 2023–24 season, in his sophomore year, he again led UConn in scoring with 16 goals and 12 assists in 35 games. On April 8, 2024, Wood announced he would transfer to the University of Minnesota for the 2024–25 season. During his junior year he recorded 17 goals and 22 assists in 39 games.

Wood made his NHL debut on April 5, 2025, against the Montreal Canadiens.

During the 2026–27 season, on November 1, 2026, Wood was traded by the Predators to the Seattle Kraken in exchange for Shane Wright.

== International play ==
Medal record

Men's ice hockey

Representing Canada

World U18 Championships
Bronze medal – third place	2023 Switzerland	

At the 2022 Hlinka Gretzky Cup, Wood put up five points in five games, winning a gold medal. At the 2023 World U18 Championships, he led Canada with 13 points in seven games, winning bronze.

== Career statistics ==
=== Regular season and playoffs ===
			Regular season					Playoffs
Season	Team	League	GP	G	A	Pts	PIM	GP	G	A	Pts	PIM
2020–21	Victoria Grizzlies	BCHL	18	5	8	13	4	—	—	—	—	—
2021–22	Victoria Grizzlies	BCHL	46	45	40	85	33	5	2	3	5	10
2022–23	University of Connecticut	HE	35	11	23	34	4	—	—	—	—	—
2023–24	University of Connecticut	HE	35	16	12	28	43	—	—	—	—	—
2024–25	University of Minnesota	B1G	39	17	22	39	16	—	—	—	—	—
2024–25	Nashville Predators	NHL	6	0	1	1	2	—	—	—	—	—
2025–26	Nashville Predators	NHL	71	17	13	30	14	—	—	—	—	—
2025–26	Milwaukee Admirals	AHL	5	1	3	4	0	—	—	—	—	—
2026–27	Nashville Predators	NHL	14	1	2	3	4	—	—	—	—	—
NHL totals			91	18	16	34	20	—	—	—	—	—

=== International ===
Year	Team	Event	Result	GP	G	A	Pts	PIM
2022	Canada	U18	5th	4	2	0	2	0
2022	Canada	HG18	1st place, gold medalist(s)	5	2	3	5	0
2023	Canada	U18	3rd place, bronze medalist(s)	7	7	6	13	6
2024	Canada	WJC	5th	5	2	2	4	0
Junior totals				21	13	11	24	6

== Awards and honours ==
Award	Year	Ref
BCHL
All-Rookie Team	2022	
First All-Star Team	2022	
Rookie of the Year	2022	
Brett Hull Trophy	2022	
College
Hockey East All-Rookie team	2023	

Awards and achievements
Preceded by Joakim Kemell	Nashville Predators first-round draft pick 2023	Succeeded by Tanner Molendyk
