= Yegor Surin =

Russian ice hockey player (born 2006)

- Born: 1 August 2006 (age 20) Voronezh, Russia
- Height: 6 ft 1 in (185 cm)
- Weight: 192 lb (87 kg; 13 st 10 lb)
- Position: Centre
- Shoots: Left
- KHL team: Lokomotiv Yaroslavl
- NHL draft: 22nd overall, 2024; Nashville Predators
- Playing career: 2024–present

Yegor Surin (born 1 August 2006) is a Russian professional ice hockey player who is a centre for Lokomotiv Yaroslavl of the Kontinental Hockey League (KHL). He was drafted 22nd overall by the Nashville Predators in the 2024 NHL entry draft.

== Playing career ==
Surin spent the majority of the 2023–24 season with Lokomotiv Yaroslavl's junior league club in the Russian Junior Hockey League (MHL), where he recorded 22 goals and 30 assists in 42 regular season games, tying for second in assists and points on the team. During the Kharlamov Cup he led his team in scoring with five goals and 18 assists in 19 playoff games. His 18 assists led all players during the playoffs. He made his professional debut with Yaroslavl's KHL team at 17 years old, and was scoreless in three games.

He was drafted 22nd overall by the Nashville Predators in the 2024 NHL entry draft.

== Career statistics ==
			Regular season					Playoffs
Season	Team	League	GP	G	A	Pts	PIM	GP	G	A	Pts	PIM
2022–23	Loko Yaroslavl	MHL	39	8	14	22	34	10	4	4	8	8
2022–23	Loko-76 Yaroslavl	MHL	9	4	5	9	6	—	—	—	—	—
2023–24	Loko Yaroslavl	MHL	42	22	30	52	108	19	5	18	23	30
2022–23	Loko-76 Yaroslavl	MHL	1	1	0	1	0	—	—	—	—	—
2023–24	Lokomotiv Yaroslavl	KHL	3	0	0	0	0	—	—	—	—	—
2024–25	Loko Yaroslavl	MHL	12	7	10	17	10	—	—	—	—	—
2024–25	Lokomotiv Yaroslavl	KHL	41	7	7	14	18	19	5	2	7	6
2025–26	Lokomotiv Yaroslavl	KHL	57	15	22	37	43	22	3	5	8	22
KHL totals			101	22	29	51	61	41	8	7	15	28

== Awards and honors ==
Award	Year
KHL
Gagarin Cup champion	2025, 2026

Awards and achievements
Preceded by Tanner Molendyk	Nashville Predators first-round draft pick 2024	Succeeded by Brady Martin
