= 2022 IIHF World U18 Championships =

2022 edition of the IIHF World U18 Championships

2022 IIHF U18 World Championship

Tournament details
- Host country: Germany
- Venues: 2 (in 2 host cities)
- Dates: 23 April – 1 May
- Teams: 8

Final positions
- Champions: Sweden (2nd title)
- Runners-up: United States
- Third place: Finland
- Fourth place: Czechia

Tournament statistics
- Games played: 20
- Goals scored: 167 (8.35 per game)
- Attendance: 25,047 (1,252 per game)
- Scoring leader: (Sweden) Jonathan Lekkerimäki (15 points)

Awards
- MVP: (Czech Republic) Jiří Kulich

Official website
- IIHF.com

The 2022 IIHF World U18 Championship was the 23rd such event hosted by the International Ice Hockey Federation. Teams participated at several levels of competition. The competition also served as qualifications for the 2023 competition. On 28 February the IIHF "suspended all Russian and Belarusian National Teams and Clubs from participation in every age category and in all IIHF competitions or events until further notice", which resulted in a reformatting of the tournament. Due to the suspensions there are two open spots in the top division, two teams can be promoted for 2023 and no team will be relegated. Additionally, all eight teams will qualify for the QF round and will be reseeded according to their tournament ranking.

Sweden won their second world championship by beating USA in the final with score 6–4. Finland won bronze by beating Czechia in the bronze medal game with score 4–1.

== Top Division ==
The tournament was held from 23 April to 1 May 2022 in Landshut and Kaufbeuren, Germany.

=== Seeding ===
Due to the suspension of Russia and Belarus, the groups were reseeded.

==== Original Seeding ====
Group A (Kaufbeuren)

- Canada (1)
- Finland (4)
- United States (5)
- Switzerland (8)
- Latvia (9)

Group B (Landshut)

- ~~Russia~~ (2)
- Sweden (3)
- ~~Belarus~~ (6)
- Czechia (7)
- Germany (10)

==== Updated Seeding ====
Group A (Landshut)

- Canada (1)
- United States (5)
- Czechia (7)
- Germany (10)

Group B (Kaufbeuren)

- Sweden (3)
- Finland (4)
- Switzerland (8)
- Latvia (9)

=== Preliminary round ===
All times are local (UTC+2).

==== Group A ====
Pos	Team	Pld	W	OTW	OTL	L	GF	GA	GD	Pts	Qualification
1	United States	3	3	0	0	0	24	7	+17	9	Advance to Quarterfinals
2	Czechia	3	1	1	0	1	12	13	−1	5	Advance to Quarterfinals
3	Canada	3	1	0	1	1	16	17	−1	4	Advance to Quarterfinals
4	Germany (H)	3	0	0	0	3	7	22	−15	0	Advance to Quarterfinals

Source: IIHF
(H) Host

23 April 2022; 15:30	Czechia	4–2 (1–1, 3–1, 0–0)	Germany	Eisstadion am Gutenbergweg, Landshut; Attendance: 2,910

Game reference

Jan Špunar
Goalies
Simon Wolf
Referees:
(Switzerland) Cedric Borga
(Denmark) Niclas Lundsgaard
Linesmen:
(Austria) Sebastian Bedynek
(Switzerland) Eric Cattaneo

	0–1	06:42 – Kechter (Lutz)
Slavíček (Rymon) – 19:25	1–1
	1–2	24:44 – Hauf (Elias, Krening)
Kulich (Prčík, Šalé) (PP) – 31:01	2–2
Bares (Sale, Petr) (PP) – 36:45	3–2
Kulich (Šalé, Petr) (PP) – 39:30	4–2

4 min
Penalties
12 min
56
Shots
21

23 April 2022; 19:30	Canada	3–8 (0–2, 3–4, 0–2)	United States	Eisstadion am Gutenbergweg, Landshut; Attendance: 2,512

Game reference

Reid Dyck
Goalies
Trey Augustine
Referees:
(Sweden) Richard Magnusson
(Finland) Sakari Suominen
Linesmen:
(Finland) Onni Hautamaki
(Sweden) Anders Nyqvist

	0–1	04:20 – Howard (Hutson)
	0–2	18:52 – Howard (Brindley, Nazar)
Wood (Bedard) – 24:42	1–2
Ward (PS) – 25:55	2–2
	2–3	29:21 – Cooley (Gauthier)
	2–4	30:10 – Lucius (Chesley, Stramel)
Bedard (Moldenhauer, Pickering) – 31:43	3–4
	3–5	34:33 – Chesley (Howard, Nazar)
	3–6	38:37 – Howard (Nazar, Brzustewicz)
	3–7	49:15 – Spicer (Kaplan, Chesley)
	3–8	50:21 – Howard (Cooley, Powell)

8 min
Penalties
8 min
30
Shots
51

24 April 2022; 15:30	United States	6–2 (0–1, 4–0, 2–1)	Czechia	Eisstadion am Gutenbergweg, Landshut; Attendance: 1,012

Game reference

Tyler Muszelik
Goalies
Michael Schnattinger
Referees:
(Sweden) Richard Magnusson
(Hungary) Zsombor Palkovi
Linesmen:
(Switzerland) Eric Cattaneo
(Sweden) Anders Nyqvist

	0–1	12:01 – Kulich (PS)
Howard (Casey, Muszelik) (PP) – 25:35	1–1
Snuggerud (Cooley, Gauthier) – 28:26	2–1
Leonard (Hutson) – 28:56	3–1
McGroarty (Kaplan) – 32:37	4–1
Cooley (Gauthier) – 48:35	5–1
	5–2	52:35 – Plos (Hamara)
McGroarty (Lucius, Stramel) – 53:29	6–2

14 min
Penalties
8 min
39
Shots
37

24 April 2022; 19:30	Germany	3–8 (0–2, 2–2, 1–4)	Canada	Eisstadion am Gutenbergweg, Landshut; Attendance: 2,075

Game reference

Philipp Dietl
Goalies
Nolan Lalonde
Referees:
(Denmark) Niclas Lundsgaard
(Finland) Sakari Suominen
Linesmen:
(Austria) Sebastian Bedynek
(Latvia) Davids Rozitis

	0–1	07:16 – Siepmann (Lorenz, Collins)
	0–2	07:40 – Goyette (Lorenz, Siepmann)
	0–3	24:36 – Bedard (Fantilli, Sova) (PP)
	0–4	25:22 – Schuurman (Goyette)
Lutz (Oswald, Bettahar) – 31:58	1–4
Kechter (Lutz, Oswald) (PP) – 34:28	2–4
Lutz (Oswald, Bettahar) (PP) – 40:25	3–4
	3–5	43:21 – Bedard (PP)
	3–6	44:34 – Bedard
	3–7	45:39 – Wood (Davies)
	3–8	57:28 – Parker (PP)

39 min
Penalties
31 min
36
Shots
49

26 April 2022; 15:30	Canada	5–6 OT (1–1, 2–3, 2–1) (OT: 0–1)	Czechia	Eisstadion am Gutenbergweg, Landshut; Attendance: 326

Game reference

Reid Dyck
Goalies
Jan Špunar
Referees:
(Hungary) Zsombor Palkovi
(Finland) Sakari Suominen
Linesmen:
(Finland) Onni Huhtamäki
(Latvia) Davids Rozitis

Moldenhauer (Dragicevic, Fantilli) – 01:55	1–0
	1–1	05:59 – Bareš (Hamara, Šalé) (PP)
	1–2	21:35 – Kulich (Hamara, Šalé) (PP)
Fantilli (PP) – 22:38	2–2
	2–3	27:29 – Gaspar (PP)
Dragicevic (Lorenz, Goyette) – 34:33	3–3
	3–4	35:15 – Kulich (Šalé, Šapovaliv) (PP)
Delic (Pickering, Hvidston	4–4
	5–4
	5–5	57:26 – Hamara (Kulich)
	5–6	61:50 – Hamara (PP)

16 min
Penalties
6 min
24
Shots
52

26 April 2022; 19:30	United States	10–2 (3–0, 5–0, 2–2)	Germany	Eisstadion am Gutenbergweg, Landshut; Attendance: 1,438

Game reference
Trey Augustine	Goalies	Simon Wolf; Philipp Dietl	Referees: (Switzerland) Cedric Borga (Sweden) Richard Magnusson; Linesmen: (Switzerland) Eric Cattaneo (Sweden) Anders Nyquist
33 min	Penalties	12 min	Referees: (Switzerland) Cedric Borga (Sweden) Richard Magnusson; Linesmen: (Switzerland) Eric Cattaneo (Sweden) Anders Nyquist
55	Shots	22	Referees: (Switzerland) Cedric Borga (Sweden) Richard Magnusson; Linesmen: (Switzerland) Eric Cattaneo (Sweden) Anders Nyquist

==== Group B ====
Pos	Team	Pld	W	OTW	OTL	L	GF	GA	GD	Pts	Qualification
1	Sweden	3	2	0	0	1	12	8	+4	6 (Note: Sweden 4–3 Finland)	Advance to Quarterfinals
2	Finland	3	2	0	0	1	13	7	+6	6	Advance to Quarterfinals
3	Switzerland	3	1	0	0	2	8	15	−7	3 (Note: Switzerland 4–3 Latvia)	Advance to Quarterfinals
4	Latvia	3	1	0	0	2	7	10	−3	3	Advance to Quarterfinals

Source: IIHF
Notes:

23 April 2022; 14:30	Finland	6–2 (1–1, 3–1, 2–0)	Switzerland	Erdgas Schwaben Arena, Kaufbeuren; Attendance: 692

Game reference
			Referees: (Germany) Marc Iwert (United States) Peter Schlittenhardt; Linesmen: (Germany) Patrick Laguzov (United States) John Waleski
33 min	Penalties	16 min	Referees: (Germany) Marc Iwert (United States) Peter Schlittenhardt; Linesmen: (Germany) Patrick Laguzov (United States) John Waleski
35	Shots	19	Referees: (Germany) Marc Iwert (United States) Peter Schlittenhardt; Linesmen: (Germany) Patrick Laguzov (United States) John Waleski

23 April 2022; 18:30	Latvia	3–2 (1–0, 2–2, 0–0)	Sweden	Erdgas Schwaben Arena, Kaufbeuren; Attendance: 854

Game reference
8 min	Penalties	8 min
21	Shots	25

24 April 2022; 14:30	Finland	4–1 (1–1, 2–0, 1–0)	Latvia	Erdgas Schwaben Arena, Kaufbeuren; Attendance: 683

Game reference
4 min	Penalties	6 min
35	Shots	16

24 April 2022; 18:30	Sweden	6–2 (0–0, 1–2, 5–0)	Switzerland	Erdgas Schwaben Arena, Kaufbeuren; Attendance: 946

Game reference
8 min	Penalties	10 min
40	Shots	27

26 April 2022; 14:30	Switzerland	4–3 (1–2, 2–1, 1–0)	Latvia	Erdgas Schwaben Arena, Kaufbeuren; Attendance: 257

Game reference
6 min	Penalties	6 min
26	Shots	23

26 April 2022; 18:30	Sweden	4–3 (2–1, 2–1, 0–1)	Finland	Erdgas Schwaben Arena, Kaufbeuren; Attendance: 684

Game reference
6 min	Penalties	8 min
31	Shots	27

=== Playoff round ===
Winning teams will be reseeded in accordance with the following ranking:

1. higher position in the group
2. higher number of points
3. better goal difference
4. higher number of goals scored for
5. better seeding coming into the tournament (final placement at the 2021 IIHF World U18 Championships).

Rank	Team	Group	Pos	Pts	GD	GF	Seed
1	United States	A	1	9	+17	24	5
2	Sweden	B	1	6	+4	12	3
3	Finland	B	2	6	+6	13	4
4	Czechia	A	2	5	-1	12	7
5	Canada	A	3	4	-1	16	1
6	Switzerland	B	3	3	-7	8	8
7	Latvia	B	4	3	-3	7	9
8	Germany	A	4	0	-15	7	10

==== Bracket ====
Quarterfinals
28 April – Landshut
1A United States	13
4B Latvia	3
28 April – Landshut
2A Czechia	8
3B Switzerland	0
28 April – Kaufbeuren
1B Sweden	7
4A Germany	1
28 April – Kaufbeuren
2B Finland (OT)	6
3A Canada	5

Semifinals
30 April – Landshut
1 United States	6
4 Czechia	1
30 April – Landshut
2 Sweden	2
3 Finland	1

Gold Medal Game
1 May – Landshut
1 United States	4
2 Sweden	6
Bronze Medal Game
1 May – Landshut
3 Finland	4
4 Czechia	1

==== Quarterfinals ====
28 April 2022; 14:30	Finland	6–5 OT (2–2, 1–2, 2–1) (OT: 1–0)	Canada	Erdgas Schwaben Arena, Kaufbeuren; Attendance: 918

Game reference
4 min	Penalties	12 min
35	Shots	29

28 April 2022; 15:30	Czechia	8–0 (4–0, 3–0, 1–0)	Switzerland	Eisstadion am Gutenbergweg, Landshut; Attendance: 505

Game reference
10 min	Penalties	10 min
36	Shots	8

28 April 2022; 18:30	Sweden	7–1 (3–0, 1–1, 3–0)	Germany	Erdgas Schwaben Arena, Kaufbeuren; Attendance: 1,703

Game reference
33 min	Penalties	18 min
46	Shots	29

28 April 2022; 19:30	United States	13–3 (6–1, 3–0, 4–2)	Latvia	Eisstadion am Gutenbergweg, Landshut; Attendance: 504

Game reference
6 min	Penalties	2 min
64	Shots	18

==== Semifinals ====
30 April 2022; 14:30	United States	6–1 (0–1, 5–0, 1–0)	Czechia	Eisstadion am Gutenbergweg, Landshut; Attendance: 1,389

Game reference
12 min	Penalties	8 min
38	Shots	27

30 April 2022; 18:30	Sweden	2–1 (0–0, 1–0, 1–1)	Finland	Eisstadion am Gutenbergweg, Landshut; Attendance: 1,430

Game reference
6 min	Penalties	8 min
23	Shots	42

==== Bronze medal game ====
1 May 2022; 14:30	Finland	4–1 (1–1, 1–0, 2–0)	Czechia	Eisstadion am Gutenbergweg, Landshut; Attendance: 1,649

Game reference
2 min	Penalties	4 min
34	Shots	27

==== Gold medal game ====
1 May 2022; 18:30	United States	4–6 (2–2, 1–2, 1–2)	Sweden	Eisstadion am Gutenbergweg, Landshut; Attendance: 2,560

Game reference
16 min	Penalties	14 min
51	Shots	15

=== Final standings ===
Pos	Grp	Team	Pld	W	OTW	OTL	L	GF	GA	GD	Pts	Final result
1	B	Sweden	6	5	0	0	1	27	14	+13	15	Champions
2	A	United States	6	5	0	0	1	47	17	+30	15	Runners-up
3	B	Finland	6	3	1	0	2	24	15	+9	11	Third place
4	A	Czechia	6	2	1	0	3	22	23	−1	8	Fourth place
5	A	Canada	4	1	0	2	1	21	23	−2	5	Eliminated in Quarter-finals
6	B	Switzerland	4	1	0	0	3	8	23	−15	3	Eliminated in Quarter-finals
7	B	Latvia	4	1	0	0	3	10	23	−13	3	Eliminated in Quarter-finals
8	A	Germany (H)	4	0	0	0	4	8	29	−21	0	Eliminated in Quarter-finals

Source: IIHF
Rules for classification: 1) position in the group; 2) number of points; 3) goal difference; 4) goals scored; 5) seeding before tournament.
(H) Host

=== Statistics ===
==== Scoring leaders ====
Pos	Player	Country	GP	G	A	Pts	+/−	PIM
1	Jonathan Lekkerimäki	Sweden	6	5	10	15	+4	4
2	Mattias Hävelid	Sweden	6	4	8	12	+4	0
3	Jiří Kulich	Czech Republic	6	9	2	11	−6	2
4	Isaac Howard	United States	6	6	5	11	+8	2
5	Noah Östlund	Sweden	6	4	6	10	+3	6
6	Logan Cooley	United States	6	3	7	10	+5	4
7	Rutger McGroarty	United States	6	8	1	9	+8	27
8	Cutter Gauthier	United States	6	3	6	9	+3	6
8	Frank Nazar	United States	6	3	6	9	+7	4
8	Liam Öhgren	Sweden	6	3	6	9	+4	2

GP = Games played; G = Goals; A = Assists; Pts = Points; +/− = Plus–minus; PIM = Penalties In Minutes
Source: IIHF

==== Goaltending leaders ====
(minimum 40% team's total ice time)

Pos	Player	Country	TOI	GA	GAA	SA	Sv%	SO
1	Hugo Hävelid	Sweden	298:28	12	2.41	170	92.94	0
2	Topias Leinonen	Finland	298:32	13	2.61	126	89.68	0
3	Trey Augustine	United States	238:36	11	2.77	93	88.17	0
4	Simon Wolf	Germany	151:35	17	6.73	137	87.59	0
5	Michael Schnattinger	Czech Republic	237:37	15	3.79	118	87.29	1

TOI = Time on ice (minutes:seconds); GA = Goals against; GAA = Goals against average; SA = Shots against; Sv% = Save percentage; SO = Shutouts
Source: IIHF

== Division I ==
=== Group A ===
The tournament was played in Piešťany, Slovakia, from 11 to 17 April 2022.

Pos	Team	Pld	W	OTW	OTL	L	GF	GA	GD	Pts	Promotion
1	Slovakia (H)	5	5	0	0	0	27	11	+16	15	Promoted to the 2023 Top Division
2	Norway	5	4	0	0	1	26	12	+14	12	Promoted to the 2023 Top Division
3	France	5	3	0	0	2	16	17	−1	9	
4	Kazakhstan	5	2	0	0	3	15	23	−8	6	
5	Denmark	5	1	0	0	4	14	16	−2	3	
6	Japan	5	0	0	0	5	8	27	−19	0	

Source: IIHF
Rules for classification: 1) points; 2) head-to-head points; 3) head-to-head goal difference; 4) head-to-head number of goals scored; 5) result against closest best-ranked team outside tied teams; 6) result against second-best ranked team outside tied teams; 7) seeding before tournament.
(H) Host

=== Group B ===
The tournament was played in Asiago, Italy, from 25 April to 1 May 2022.

Pos	Team	Pld	W	OTW	OTL	L	GF	GA	GD	Pts	Promotion
1	Hungary	5	5	0	0	0	19	3	+16	15	Promoted to the 2023 Division I A
2	Ukraine	5	4	0	0	1	30	11	+19	12	Promoted to the 2023 Division I A
3	Italy (H)	5	3	0	0	2	15	18	−3	9	
4	Slovenia	5	2	0	0	3	12	12	0	6	
5	Austria	5	1	0	0	4	11	24	−13	3	
6	Poland	5	0	0	0	5	11	30	−19	0	

Source: IIHF
Rules for classification: 1) points; 2) head-to-head points; 3) head-to-head goal difference; 4) head-to-head number of goals scored; 5) result against closest best-ranked team outside tied teams; 6) result against second-best ranked team outside tied teams; 7) seeding before tournament.
(H) Host

== Division II ==
=== Group A ===
The tournament was played in Tallinn, Estonia, from 3 to 9 April 2022.

Pos	Team	Pld	W	OTW	OTL	L	GF	GA	GD	Pts	Promotion
1	South Korea	5	4	0	0	1	33	9	+24	12 (Note: South Korea 2–1 Estonia)	Promoted to the 2023 Division I B
2	Estonia (H)	5	4	0	0	1	24	7	+17	12	Promoted to the 2023 Division I B
3	Great Britain	5	3	1	0	1	20	9	+11	11	
4	Lithuania	5	2	0	0	3	16	21	−5	6	
5	Romania	5	1	0	1	3	6	21	−15	4	
6	Serbia	5	0	0	0	5	7	39	−32	0	

Source: IIHF
Rules for classification: 1) points; 2) head-to-head points; 3) head-to-head goal difference; 4) head-to-head number of goals scored; 5) result against closest best-ranked team outside tied teams; 6) result against second-best ranked team outside tied teams; 7) seeding before tournament.
(H) Host

=== Group B ===
The tournament was played in Sofia, Bulgaria, from 21 to 24 March 2022.

Pos	Team	Pld	W	OTW	OTL	L	GF	GA	GD	Pts	Promotion
1	Croatia	3	3	0	0	0	18	2	+16	9	Promoted to the 2023 Division II A
2	Spain	3	2	0	0	1	9	7	+2	6	Promoted to the 2023 Division II A
3	Netherlands	3	1	0	0	2	10	12	−2	3	
4	Bulgaria (H)	3	0	0	0	3	3	19	−16	0	
–	China (Note: China withdrew their team because of the COVID-19 pandemic.)	0	0	0	0	0	0	0	0	0	Withdrawn
–	Australia (Note: Australia withdrew their team on 22 January 2022 because of the COVID-19 pandemic.)	0	0	0	0	0	0	0	0	0	Withdrawn

Source: IIHF
Rules for classification: 1) points; 2) head-to-head points; 3) head-to-head goal difference; 4) head-to-head number of goals scored; 5) result against closest best-ranked team outside tied teams; 6) result against second-best ranked team outside tied teams; 7) seeding before tournament.
(H) Host

== Division III ==
=== Group A ===
The tournament was played in Istanbul, Turkey, from 11 to 17 April 2022.

Pos	Team	Pld	W	OTW	OTL	L	GF	GA	GD	Pts	Promotion
1	Chinese Taipei	5	4	0	0	1	24	11	+13	12 (Note: Chinese Taipei 3 Pts, +1 GD; Belgium 3 Pts, 0 GD; Iceland 3 Pts, –1 GD)	Promoted to the 2023 Division II B
2	Belgium	5	4	0	0	1	23	8	+15	12	Promoted to the 2023 Division II B
3	Iceland	5	4	0	0	1	18	12	+6	12	
4	Israel	5	2	0	0	3	15	19	−4	6	
5	Mexico	5	0	1	0	4	8	22	−14	2	
6	Turkey (H)	5	0	0	1	4	8	24	−16	1	

Source: IIHF
Rules for classification: 1) points; 2) head-to-head points; 3) head-to-head goal difference; 4) head-to-head number of goals scored; 5) result against closest best-ranked team outside tied teams; 6) result against second-best ranked team outside tied teams; 7) seeding before tournament.
(H) Host

=== Group B ===
The tournament was played in Sarajevo, Bosnia and Herzegovina, from 17 to 22 April 2022.

Pos	Team	Pld	W	OTW	OTL	L	GF	GA	GD	Pts	Promotion
1	Bosnia and Herzegovina (H)	4	4	0	0	0	37	15	+22	12	Promoted to the 2023 Division III A
2	Luxembourg	4	1	0	0	3	20	36	−16	3	Promoted to the 2023 Division III A
3	South Africa	4	1	0	0	3	21	27	−6	3	
–	New Zealand (Note: New Zealand withdrew their team because of the COVID-19 pandemic.)	0	0	0	0	0	0	0	0	0	Withdrawn
–	Hong Kong (Note: Hong Kong withdrew their team because of the COVID-19 pandemic.)	0	0	0	0	0	0	0	0	0	Withdrawn

Source: IIHF
Rules for classification: 1) points; 2) head-to-head points; 3) head-to-head goal difference; 4) head-to-head number of goals scored; 5) result against closest best-ranked team outside tied teams; 6) result against second-best ranked team outside tied teams; 7) seeding before tournament.
(H) Host
