= Caden Price =

Canadian ice hockey player (born 2005)

- Born: August 24, 2005 (age 21) Saskatoon, Saskatchewan, Canada
- Height: 6 ft 1 in (185 cm)
- Weight: 186 lb (84 kg; 13 st 4 lb)
- Position: Defenceman
- Shoots: Right
- NHL team (P) Cur. team: Seattle Kraken; Coachella Valley Firebirds (AHL)
- NHL draft: 84th overall, 2023; Seattle Kraken
- Playing career: 2025–present

Caden Price (born August 24, 2005) is a Canadian professional ice hockey player who is a defenceman for the Coachella Valley Firebirds of the American Hockey League (AHL) while under contract to the Seattle Kraken of the National Hockey League (NHL). He was drafted in the third round, 84th overall, by the Kraken in the 2023 NHL entry draft.

Growing up in Saskatchewan, Price played junior hockey with the Saskatoon Generals of the Saskatchewan AA Hockey League U15 and the Saskatoon Contacts of the Saskatchewan Male U18 AAA Hockey League. He was selected by the Kelowna Rockets in the 2020 Western Hockey League (WHL) bantam draft, and he joined the team in 2021. Midway through his fourth season with the team, he was traded to the Lethbridge Hurricanes, with whom he finished his final junior season. In 2025, he joined the Firebirds for his first professional campaign.

Internationally, Price has represented Canada, doing so at the Hlinka Gretzky Cup in 2022 and the IIHF World U18 Championship in 2023 at the U18 level and at the World Junior Championships in 2025 at the U20 level.

== Playing career ==
=== Junior ===
A native of Saskatoon, Saskatchewan, Price played junior hockey locally with the Saskatoon Generals of the Saskatchewan AA Hockey League U15. During the 2019–20 season with the team, he tallied 31 goals and 24 assists for 55 points through 31 games, also notching five points in four playoff games. That season, he also played with the Saskatoon Contacts of the Saskatchewan Male U18 AAA Hockey League, appearing in three games. On April 22, 2020, Price was selected 30th overall by the Kelowna Rockets in the 2020 Western Hockey League (WHL) bantam draft. On July 28, he was signed by the Rockets. During the 2020–21 season, Price continued with the Contacts, recording two goals and two assists in six games with the team.

Price made his WHL debut during the 2021–22 season on October 8, 2021, also recording his first WHL point, an assist, in a 6–3 loss to the Victoria Royals. The next day, Price scored his first WHL goal in a 6–4 win against the Royals. Price finished his first WHL season with two goals and 19 assists in 47 games, also achieving a +24 rating. During the 2022 WHL playoffs, Price played in four games, recording no points. Through the first 36 games of the 2022–23 season, Price led all rockets defencemen in scoring with five goals and 17 assists for 22 points. His performance led him to be ranked 30th among North American skaters by the NHL Central Scouting Bureau in their mid-season rankings. On January 25, 2023, Price competed in the CHL/NHL Top Prospects Game for Team White, helping them to a 4–2 victory over Team Red. Through 65 games, Price finished the season with five goals and 35 assists for 40 points, leading him to be named the Rockets' top defenceman for that season. On March 31, Price scored his first WHL playoff goal in a 3–2 loss to the Seattle Thunderbirds. Price would add an assist to finish the postseason with two points in four games. Price fell to 47th place among North American skaters in the NHL Central Scouting Bureau's final rankings, and on June 29, at the 2023 NHL entry draft, he was selected in the third round, 84th overall, by the Seattle Kraken.

In July 2023, Price attended the Kraken's development camp, and in September, he attended the team's rookie camp. He was reassigned to the Rockets on September 27 to start the 2023–24 season. In the first 34 games of the season, Price recorded six goals and 26 assists. He finished the season with 13 goals and 42 assists for 55 points through 62 games. This landed him a spot on the WHL B.C. Division Second All-Star Team. In the first two games of the 2024 WHL playoffs, Price recorded a league-high five points. He finished the playoffs with 11 points in 11 games. On April 24, 2024, he signed a three-year, entry-level contract with the Kraken.

Price once again attended the Kraken's rookie camp prior to the 2024–25 season, and he was returned to the Rockets on September 23, 2024. On October 9, Price was named an alternate captain of the Rockets. In the first 36 games of the season, he notched six goals and 26 assists for 32 points. He was subsequently traded to the Lethbridge Hurricanes in exchange for Will Sharpe, the rights to Harrison Boetigger, and five draft picks on January 7, 2025. He tallied his first point as a Hurricane on January 18 in a 4–2 victory over the Wenatchee Wild. With the Hurricanes, he totaled three goals and eight assists in 30 games. In the 2025 WHL playoffs, he recorded eight points through 16 games. After the playoffs, on May 5, Price was reassigned to the Coachella Valley Firebirds, the American Hockey League (AHL) affiliate of the Kraken.

=== Professional ===
Price once more took part in the Kraken's rookie camp before being assigned to the Firebirds to start the 2025–26 season. Price made his AHL debut during the Firebirds' season opener on October 10, in a 5–0 loss to the San Diego Gulls. He secured his first AHL point, an assist, on October 19, in a 5–4 loss to the Bakersfield Condors. On January 10, he scored his first AHL goal in a 3–2 win over the Henderson Silver Knights. Price finished his first professional season with two goals and nine assists in 42 games.

== International play ==
On July 25, 2022, Price was named to Canada's roster for the 2022 Hlinka Gretzky Cup. In five games at the tournament, Price recorded one goal and four assists, helping Canada win the gold medal. On April 15, 2023, he was selected for Canada's roster for the 2023 IIHF World U18 Championships. There, he tallied five assists in seven games, and won a bronze medal. On December 13, 2024, Price was chosen to represent Canada at the 2025 World Junior Ice Hockey Championships. In five games at competition, he put up one goal and one assist.

== Career statistics ==
=== Regular season and playoffs ===
			Regular season					Playoffs
Season	Team	League	GP	G	A	Pts	PIM	GP	G	A	Pts	PIM
2021–22	Kelowna Rockets	WHL	47	2	19	21	21	4	0	0	0	0
2022–23	Kelowna Rockets	WHL	65	5	35	40	43	4	1	1	2	2
2023–24	Kelowna Rockets	WHL	62	13	42	55	48	11	1	10	11	8
2024–25	Kelowna Rockets	WHL	27	6	26	32	22	—	—	—	—	—
2024–25	Lethbridge Hurricanes	WHL	30	3	8	11	40	16	2	6	8	12
2025–26	Coachella Valley Firebirds	AHL	42	2	9	11	15	—	—	—	—	—
AHL totals			42	2	9	11	15	—	—	—	—	—

=== International ===
Year	Team	Event	Result	GP	G	A	Pts	PIM
2022	Canada	HG18	1st place, gold medalist(s)	5	1	4	5	2
2023	Canada	U18	3rd place, bronze medalist(s)	7	0	5	5	4
2025	Canada	WJC	5th	5	1	1	2	0
Junior totals				17	2	10	12	6
