= Calum Ritchie =

Canadian ice hockey player (born 2005)

- Born: January 21, 2005 (age 21) Brampton, Ontario, Canada
- Height: 6 ft 2 in (188 cm)
- Weight: 187 lb (85 kg; 13 st 5 lb)
- Position: Centre
- Shoots: Right
- NHL team Former teams: New York Islanders; Colorado Avalanche
- NHL draft: 27th overall, 2023; Colorado Avalanche
- Playing career: 2024–present

Calum Ritchie (born January 21, 2005) is a Canadian professional ice hockey player who is a centre for the New York Islanders of the National Hockey League (NHL). He was drafted 27th overall by the Colorado Avalanche in the 2023 NHL entry draft, for whom he played seven NHL games.

== Playing career ==
The onset of the COVID-19 pandemic hampered Ritchie's final pre-major junior season with the Oakville Rangers, though toward the final months of what would have been the 2020–21 season restrictions were eased sufficiently for the team to practice and eventually play showcase games. He was taken by the Oshawa Generals in the 2021 Ontario Hockey League (OHL) draft. Debuting with the Generals in the 2021–22 season, Ritchie recorded 45 points in 65 regular season games, and a further seven points in six playoff games. He was second in scoring among players under the age of 17. He was named to the league's First All-Rookie Team.

While playing with Canada under-18 team at the 2022 Hlinka Gretzky Cup, Ritchie sustained a shoulder injury that would become a recurring problem during the 2022–23 season, with his shoulder dislocating four different times. He produced 24 goals and 25 assists in 59 regular season games with the Generals. Considered a possible top 10 selection in the 2023 NHL entry draft following the Hlinka Gretzky Cup, his draft year struggles negatively impacted his standing thereafter. Ritchie was ultimately taken late in the first round, 27th overall, by the Colorado Avalanche.

Ritchie underwent shoulder surgery following the 2023 NHL scouting combine, and as a result made his 2023–24 season debut only on November 12. With his shoulder issues behind him, he enjoyed success, posting 80 points in 50 regular season games. In recognition of his achievements, he was named to the OHL Second All-Star Team. The Generals went on a deep run in the 2024 playoffs, reaching the OHL finals, where they were swept by the London Knights in four games. Ritchie managed 30 points in 21 playoff games.

After participating in his first Colorado Avalanche rookie camp in preparation for the 2024–25 season, Ritchie was signed to a three-year, entry-level contract with the club on July 9, 2024. With a number of the team's veteran players sidelined by injury, he was named to the Avalanche's opening night roster. On October 14, Ritchie scored his first career NHL goal against New York Islanders goaltender Ilya Sorokin in a 6–2 loss to the Islanders. Ritchie featured in seven games with the Avalanche, finishing with one goal, before he was returned to continue his development with junior club, the Oshawa Generals, on October 24. Ritchie resumed his top line centre role with the Generals. On March 6, 2025, having posted 67 points through 41 games in the OHL, he was traded by the Avalanche along with Oliver Kylington and conditional first-round and third-round selections to the New York Islanders in exchange for Brock Nelson and William Dufour. Ritchie finished the OHL regular season with 15 goals and 55 assists in 47 games, and was named to the league's Third All-Star Team. He then led the Generals on a deep run to the OHL finals. Oshawa was ultimately defeated in the series once again by the London Knights.

=== New York Islanders ===
Ritchie scored his first goal as an Islander during a 3–2 win against the Dallas Stars on November 18, 2025.

== International play ==
Medal record

Men's ice hockey

Representing Canada

World U18 Championships
Bronze medal – third place	2023 Switzerland	

Hlinka Gretzky Cup
Gold medal – first place	2022 Canada	

Ritchie made his international debut for Canada with the national under-18 team at the 2022 Hlinka Gretzky Cup, where he recorded four goals and six assists in five games, winning gold with the team. His 10 points led the tournament in scoring. He rejoined the team for the 2023 World U18 Championships the following spring. He had three goals and six assists in seven games, while Canada won the bronze medal.

== Career statistics ==
=== Regular season and playoffs ===
			Regular season					Playoffs
Season	Team	League	GP	G	A	Pts	PIM	GP	G	A	Pts	PIM
2021–22	Oshawa Generals	OHL	65	19	26	45	12	6	4	3	7	4
2022–23	Oshawa Generals	OHL	59	24	35	59	35	5	2	4	6	2
2023–24	Oshawa Generals	OHL	50	28	52	80	20	21	8	22	30	16
2024–25	Colorado Avalanche	NHL	7	1	0	1	0	—	—	—	—	—
2024–25	Oshawa Generals	OHL	47	15	55	70	50	21	9	16	25	22
2025–26	Bridgeport Islanders	AHL	3	1	2	3	2	2	1	0	1	0
2025–26	New York Islanders	NHL	65	13	17	30	22	—	—	—	—	—
NHL totals			72	14	17	31	22	—	—	—	—	—

=== International ===
Year	Team	Event	Result	GP	G	A	Pts	PIM
2022	Canada	HG18	1st place, gold medalist(s)	5	4	6	10	2
2023	Canada	U18	3rd place, bronze medalist(s)	7	3	6	9	4
2025	Canada	WJC	5th	5	1	1	2	14
Junior totals				17	8	13	21	20

== Awards and honours ==
Award	Year	Ref
OHL
First All-Rookie Team	2022	
Second All-Star Team	2024	
Third All-Star Team	2025	

Awards and achievements
Preceded by Oskar Olausson	Colorado Avalanche first-round draft pick 2023	Succeeded by Mikhail Gulyayev
