= Tero Leinonen =

Finnish ice hockey goaltender

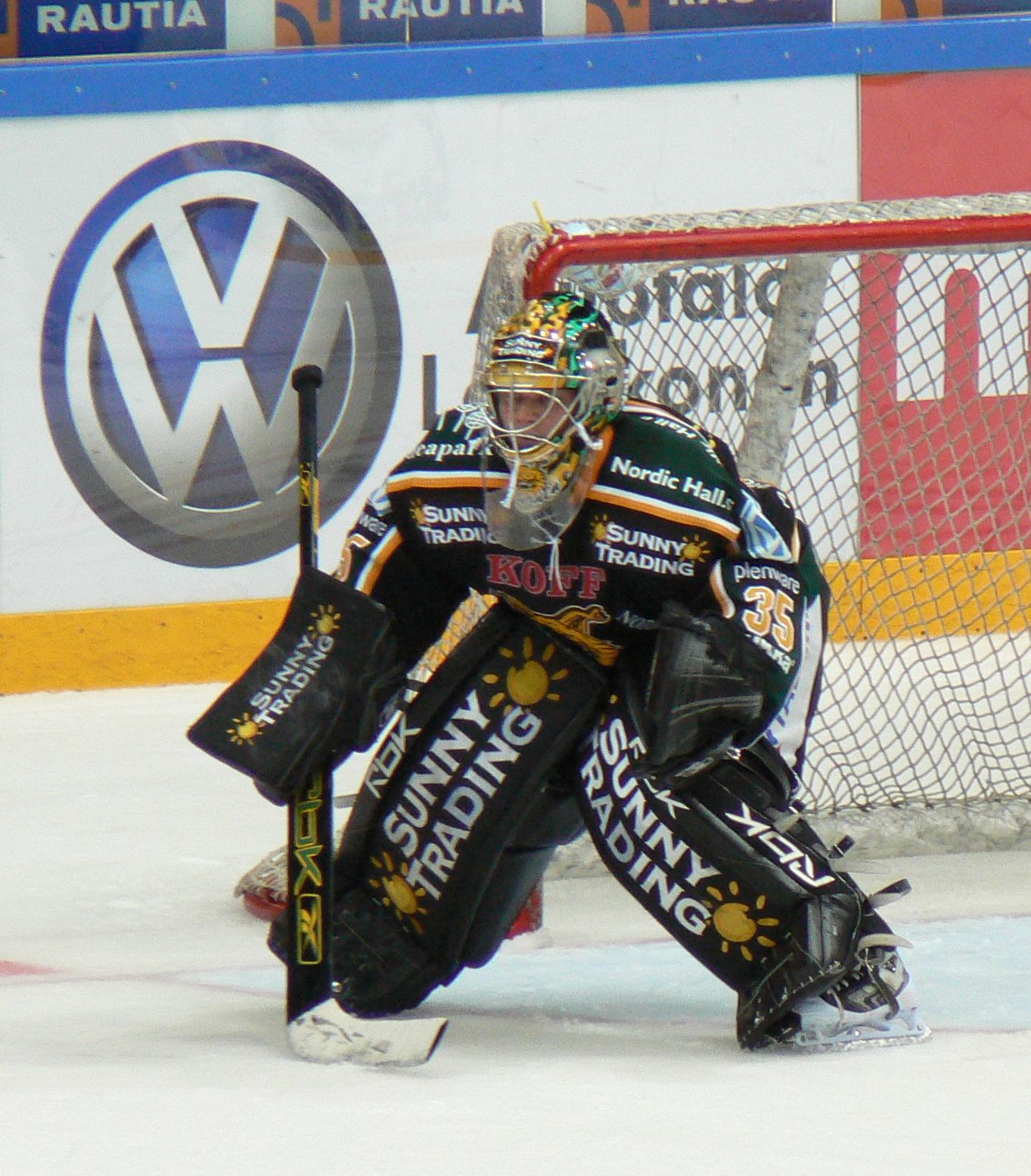
- Leinonen with Ilves in 2007
- Born: 9 March 1975 (age 50) Mikkeli, Finland
- Height: 5 ft 11 in (180 cm)
- Weight: 191 lb (87 kg; 13 st 9 lb)
- Position: Goaltender
- Caught: Left
- Playing career: 1994–2011

Tero Leinonen (born 9 March 1975 in Mikkeli, Finland) is a retired ice hockey goaltender who was last playing with the Iserlohn Roosters in the Deutsche Eishockey Liga.

== Playing career ==
Leinonen began his career playing for Mikkelin Jukurit

He played for Ilves.

== Personal life ==
Leinonen's son Topias is also a goaltender and is a prospect of the Buffalo Sabres, who selected him 41st overall in the 2022 NHL entry draft.
