= Martin Matějíček =

Czech ice hockey defencemen

Martin Matejicek
- Born: September 4, 1991 (age 34) Uherský Brod, Czechoslovakia
- Height: 6 ft 2 in (188 cm)
- Weight: 179 lb (81 kg; 12 st 11 lb)
- Position: Defence
- Shoots: Left
- Ligue Magnus team Former teams: Aigles de Nice; HC Zlín
- Playing career: 2010–present

Martin Matějíček (born September 4, 1991) is a Czech professional ice hockey defenceman. He is currently playing for Aigles de Nice of the Ligue Magnus.

Matějíček previously played with HC Zlín in the Czech Extraliga, playing 275 regular season games and 55 playoff games for the team between 2010 and 2019.

== Career statistics ==
			Regular season					Playoffs
Season	Team	League	GP	G	A	Pts	PIM	GP	G	A	Pts	PIM
2006–07	HC Zlin U18	Czech U18	26	0	0	0	8	8	0	0	0	6
2007–08	HC Zlin U18	Czech U18	28	8	6	14	20	7	0	3	3	0
2008–09	HC Zlin U20	Czech U20	33	1	3	4	18	5	0	0	0	6
2009–10	HC Zlin U20	Czech U20	44	8	11	19	66	10	1	2	3	16
2010–11	HC Zlin U20	Czech U20	32	4	10	14	26	2	0	0	0	0
2010–11	HC Zlin	Czech	7	0	1	1	6	4	0	0	0	4
2010–11	HC Prerov	Czech3	5	1	0	1	8	—	—	—	—	—
2011–12	HC Zlin U20	Czech U20	4	0	2	2	14	—	—	—	—	—
2011–12	HC Zlin	Czech	38	0	1	1	8	6	0	1	1	2
2012–13	HC Zlin	Czech	29	5	5	10	39	13	0	0	0	4
2013–14	HC Zlin	Czech	27	1	2	3	59	13	1	1	2	8
2013–14	HC Sumperk	Czech2	5	0	2	2	2	—	—	—	—	—
2013–14	SK Horacka Slavia Trebic	Czech2	2	0	0	0	0	—	—	—	—	—
2014–15	HC Zlin	Czech	30	4	8	12	28	2	0	1	1	2
2014–15	HC AZ Havířov 2010	Czech2	16	3	3	6	6	—	—	—	—	—
2015–16	HC Zlin	Czech	52	1	14	15	28	8	0	2	2	4
2016–17	HC Zlin	Czech	42	1	8	9	14	—	—	—	—	—
2017–18	Berani Zlin	Czech	45	1	7	8	42	3	0	0	0	0
2018–19	Berani Zlin	Czech	5	0	0	0	4	—	—	—	—	—
2018–19	HC Poruba	Czech2	36	2	4	6	50	—	—	—	—	—
2018–19	HC Dukla Jihlava	Czech2	15	0	2	2	8	10	1	3	4	12
2019–20	Nice hockey Côte d'Azur	Ligue Magnus	40	0	3	3	48	—	—	—	—	—
2020–21	Nice hockey Côte d'Azur	Ligue Magnus	25	3	2	5	51	—	—	—	—	—
2021–22	HC Spartak Uherský Brod	Czech4	6	1	2	3	2	1	0	0	0	0
Czech totals			275	13	46	59	228	49	1	5	6	24
