= Topias Leinonen =

Finnish ice hockey player (born 2004)

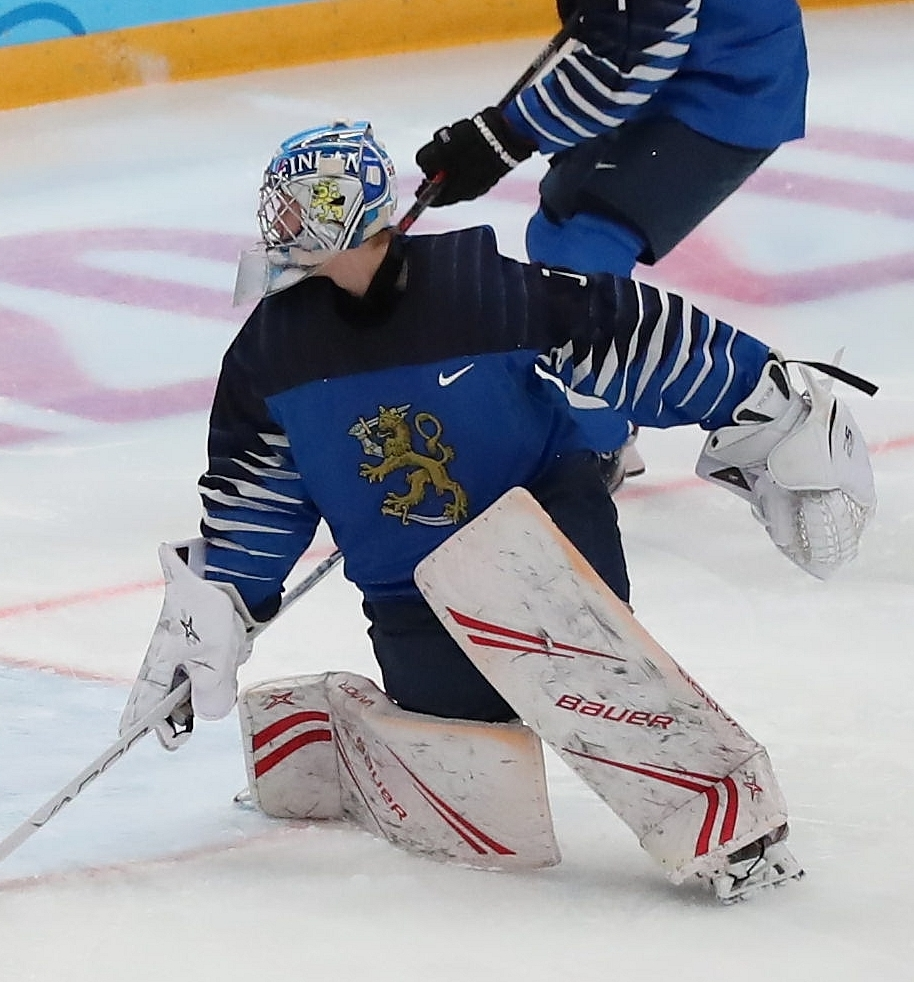
- Leinonen at the 2020 Winter Youth Olympics
- Born: 25 January 2004 (age 22) Jyväskylä, Finland
- Height: 6 ft 5 in (196 cm)
- Weight: 234 lb (106 kg; 16 st 10 lb)
- Position: Goaltender
- Catches: Left
- NHL team (P) Cur. team Former teams: Buffalo Sabres; Idaho Steelheads (ECHL); JYP Jyväskylä; Mora IK
- NHL draft: 41st overall, 2022; Buffalo Sabres
- Playing career: 2021–present

Topias Leinonen (born 25 January 2004) is a Finnish professional ice hockey goaltender for the Idaho Steelheads in the ECHL while under contract to the Buffalo Sabres of the National Hockey League (NHL). Leinonen was selected 41st overall by the Buffalo Sabres in the 2nd round of the 2022 NHL entry draft.

== Playing career ==
After playing for Ilves in his youth, Leinonen moved to JYP Jyväskylä's Under-16 program. He played for the JYP Under-16 team in 2018–19, and the Under-18 team in 2019–20. After playing 15 for the Under-20 team in 2020–21, Leinonen played 21 games for the Under-20 team in the 2021–22 season and played 4 games in Liiga for the senior team.

In 2021–22 he spent time on loan with KeuPa HT of Mestis.

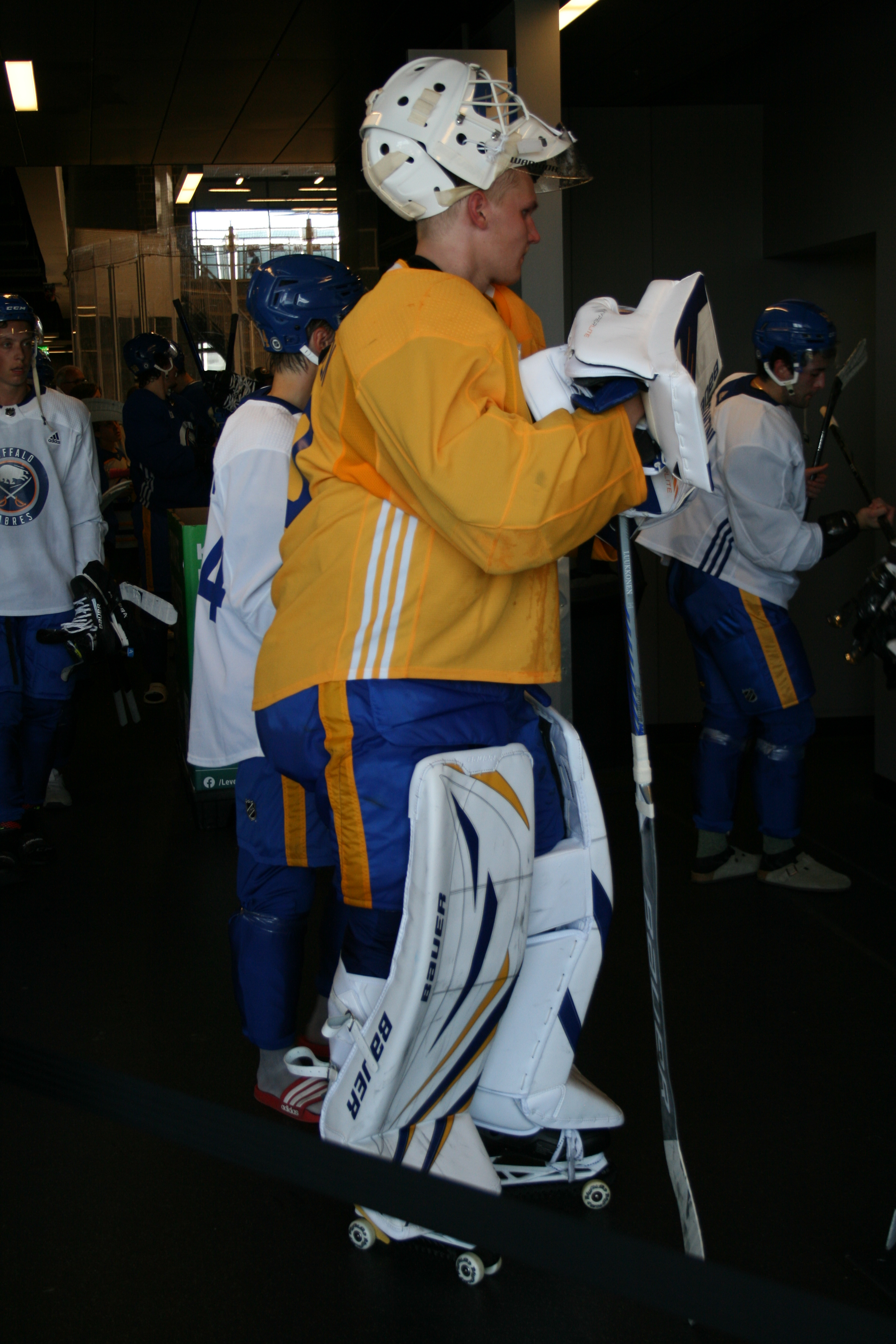
Leinonen at Buffalo Sabres Development Camp in 2024

Going into the 2022 NHL Entry Draft, Leinonen was regarded as the top goaltending prospect and was ranked as the top European goalie by NHL Central Scouting. He was drafted 41st overall by the Buffalo Sabres, as the first goaltender selected in the 2022 NHL entry draft. He attended Buffalo Sabres Development Camp in 2022, 2023, and 2024.

Leinonen joined Mora IK in the HockeyAllsvenskan in the 2024–25 season. He played 25 games for Mora where he recorded a 2.31 goals against average and a .910 save percentage. On March 28, 2025, the Buffalo Sabres signed Leinonen to a 3-year, entry-level contract to begin in the 2025–26 season. He reported to the Rochester Americans on a professional tryout agreement for the remainder of the 2024–25 season before being released from the PTO in May.

In 2025–26, Leinonen played 7 games with the Rochester Americans, where he recorded a 3.11 goals against average and a 3–3–0 record. On 4 February 2026, Leinonen was reassigned to the Jacksonville Icemen, the ECHL affiliate of the Sabres.

== International play ==
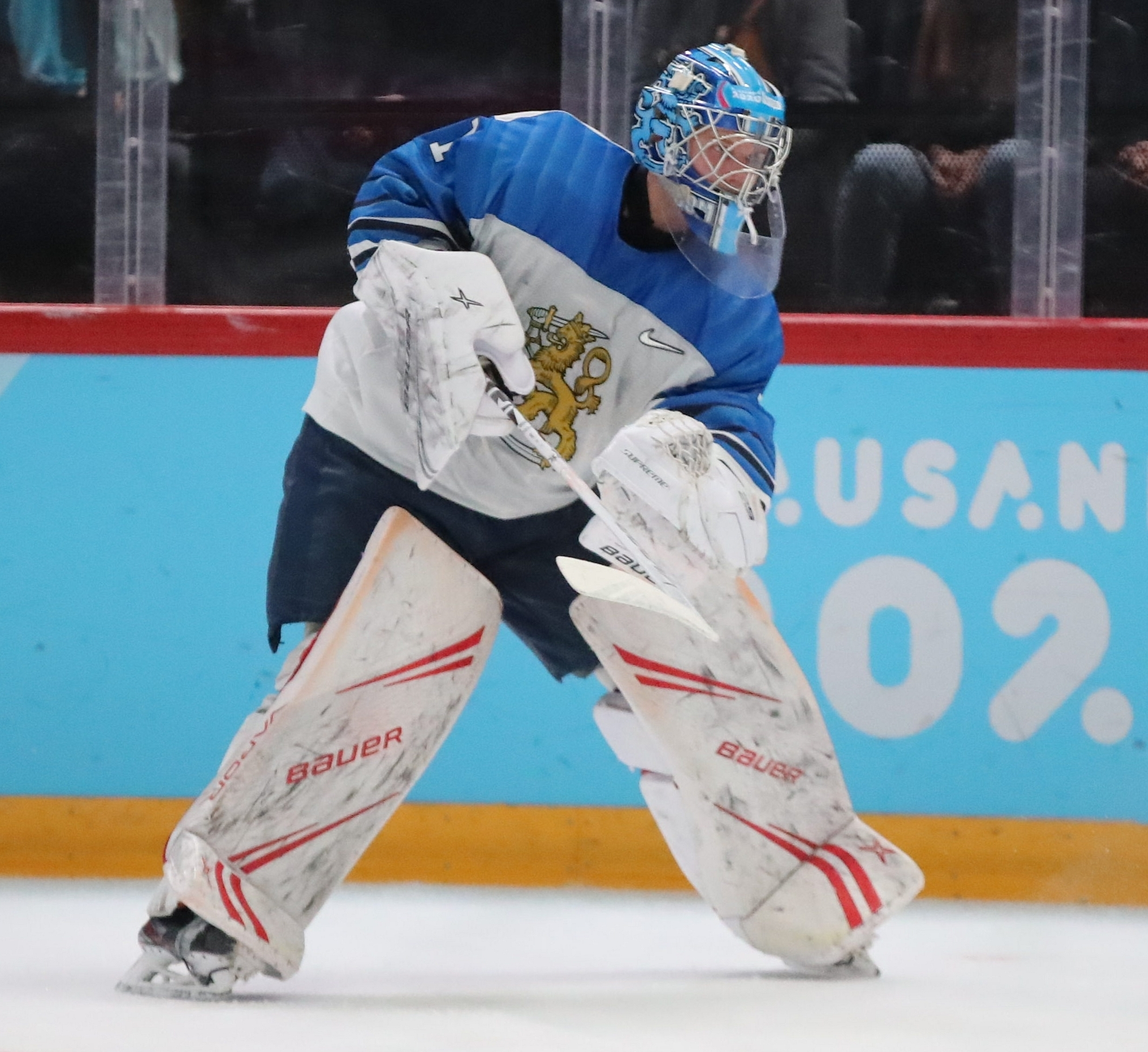
- Leinonen at the 2020 Winter Youth Olympics

Medal record

Representing Finland

Ice hockey

World U18 Championships
Bronze medal – third place	2022 Germany	

Leinonen represented Finland at the 2020 Winter Youth Olympics, where he played 4 games with a .837 save percentage.

Leinonen represented Finland at the 2022 IIHF World U18 Championships, where he recorded a 2.61 goals against average and a .897 save percentage in 5 games played en route to a bronze medal.

== Personal life ==
Leinonen is the son of former Finnish ice hockey goaltender Tero Leinonen.

== Career statistics ==
=== Regular season and playoffs ===
			Regular season									Playoffs
Season	Team	League	GP	W	L	OTL	MIN	GA	SO	GAA	SV%	GP	W	L	MIN	GA	SO	GAA	SV%
2019–20	JYP	U20	22	—	—	—	—	68	—	—	.910	—	—	—	—	—	—	—	—
2020–21	JYP	U20	15	—	—	—	—	41	—	2.59	.895	3	—	—	—	8	—	2.67	.860
2021–22	JYP	U20	21	9	10	0	1264	48	2	2.28	.916	—	—	—	—	—	—	—	—
2021–22	JYP	Liiga	4	0	1	2	215	5	0	5.02	.825	—	—	—	—	—	—	—	—
2021–22	KeuPa HT	Mestis	2	1	1	0	95	5	0	3.15	.861	—	—	—	—	—	—	—	—
2022–23	JYP	U20	23	12	10	0			1	2.72	.885	—	—	—	—	—	—	—	—
2022–23	JYP	Liiga	8	1	5	1	390	20	1	3.08	.858	—	—	—	—	—	—	—	—
2022–23	KeuPa HT	Mestis	2	1	1	0	116	7	0	3.61	.868	—	—	—	—	—	—	—	—
2023–24	JYP	U20	4	1	3	0			0	3.28	.871	7	3	4	—	—	1	2.78	.892
2023–24	JYP	Liiga	6	0	4	1	333	23	0	4.14	.844	—	—	—	—	—	—	—	—
2023–24	KeuPa HT	Mestis	2	0	2	0	119	9	0	4.53	.850	—	—	—	—	—	—	—	—
2024–25	Mora IK	Allsv	25	13	10	0	1454	56	4	2.31	.910	6	2	4	358	13	0	2.18	.929
2025–26	Rochester Americans	AHL	8	3	3	0	397	23	0	3.48	.855	—	—	—	—	—	—	—	—
2025–26	Jacksonville Icemen	ECHL	7	3	1	1	352	19	0	3.24	.880	—	—	—	—	—	—	—	—
Liiga totals			18	1	10	4	938	48	1	3.90	.844	—	—	—	—	—	—	—	—

=== International ===
Year	Team	Event	Result	GP	W	L	OT	MIN	GA	SO	GAA	SV%
2022	Finland	U18	3rd place, bronze medalist(s)	5	3	2	0	299	13	0	2.61	.897
Junior totals				5	3	2	0	299	13	0	2.61	.897
