= Jiří Kulich =

Czech ice hockey player (born 2004)

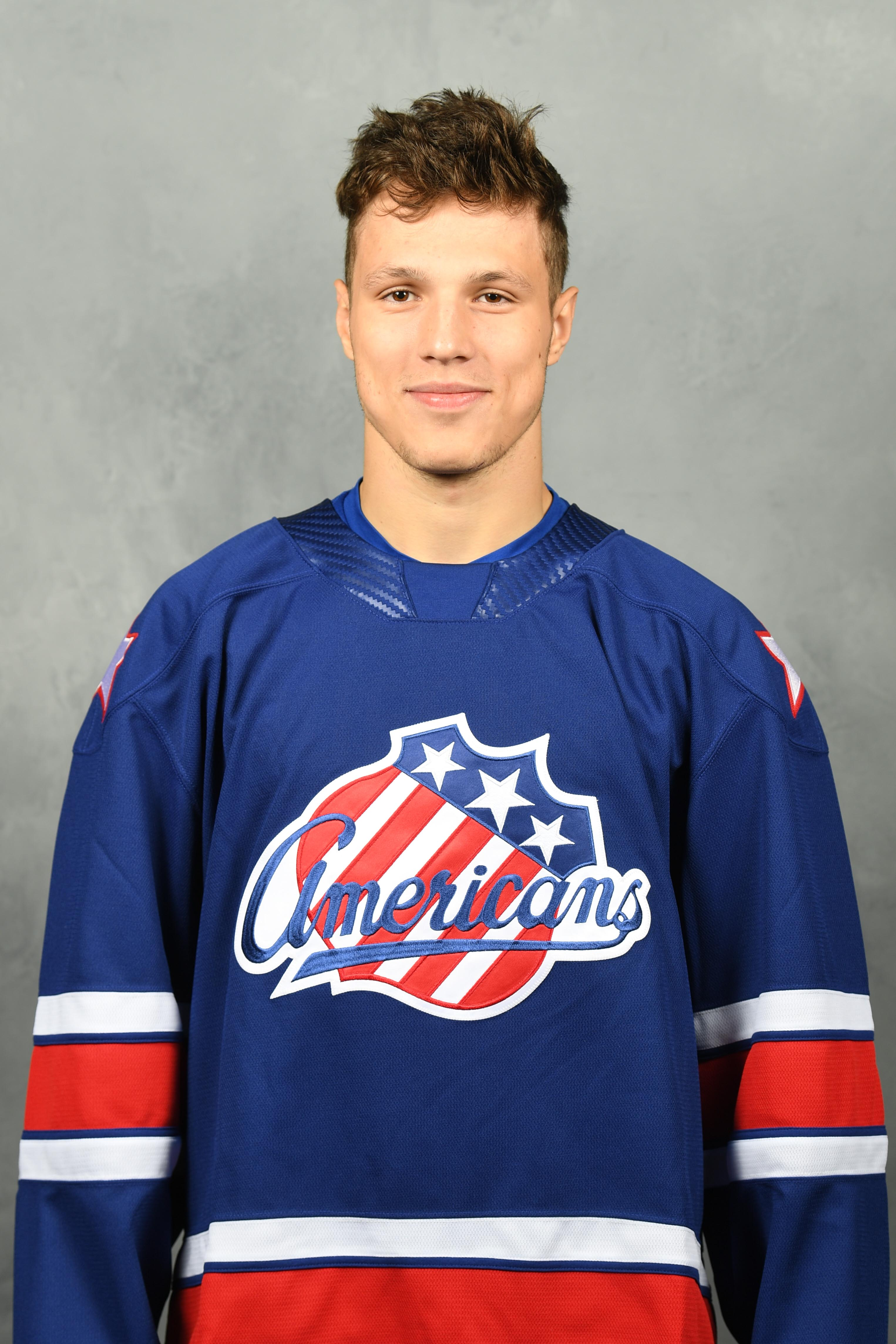
- Kulich in 2023 with the Rochester Americans
- Born: 14 April 2004 (age 22) Kadaň, Czech Republic
- Height: 6 ft 0 in (183 cm)
- Weight: 193 lb (88 kg; 13 st 11 lb)
- Position: Centre, Left wing
- Shoots: Left
- NHL team Former teams: Buffalo Sabres; HC Energie Karlovy Vary
- NHL draft: 28th overall, 2022; Buffalo Sabres
- Playing career: 2020–present

Jiří Kulich (born 14 April 2004) is a Czech professional ice hockey player who is a centre for the Buffalo Sabres of the National Hockey League (NHL). He was drafted 28th overall by the Sabres in the 2022 NHL entry draft.

== Playing career ==
Kulich made his professional debut for HC Energie Karlovy Vary in the Czech Extraliga during the 2020–21 season, where he appeared in eight games. During the 2021–22 season he recorded nine goals and five assists in 49 games. He was drafted in the first round, 28th overall, by the Buffalo Sabres in the 2022 NHL entry draft.

On 15 July 2022, Kulich embarked on his North American career after he was signed to a three-year, entry-level contract with the Sabres.

On 25 November 2023 during the 2023–24 season, Kulich made his NHL debut with the Sabres against the New Jersey Devils. In 2023–24 season, Kulich won a Czech Junior of the year.

After his 12 game of the 2025–26 season on 1 November 2025, Kulich missed the entire rest of the season due to a blood clot. He returned for training camp the next season.

== International play ==
Medal record

Men's ice hockey

Representing the Czech Republic

World Junior Championships
| Silver medal – second place | 2023 Canada | |
| Bronze medal – third place | 2024 Sweden | |

Kulich represented the Czech Republic under-18 team at the 2021 IIHF World U18 Championships where he appeared in four games. He again represented Czech Republic at the 2022 IIHF World U18 Championships where he served as captain. He led the tournament in goals with nine and was subsequently named tournament MVP.

He represented the Czech Republic national junior team at the 2022 World Junior Ice Hockey Championships. He again represented the Czech Republic at the 2023 World Junior Ice Hockey Championships where he recorded seven goals and two assists in seven games and won a silver medal. He again represented the Czech Republic at the 2024 World Junior Ice Hockey Championships where he recorded a team-leading six goals and six assists in seven games and won a bronze medal.

== Career statistics ==
=== Regular season and playoffs ===
| | | | Regular season | | | | | Playoffs |
| Season | Team | League | GP | G | A | Pts | PIM | GP | G | A | Pts | PIM |
|---|---|---|---|---|---|---|---|---|---|---|---|---|
| 2020–21 | Piráti Chomutov | CZE U20 | 5 | 3 | 2 | 5 | 0 | — | — | — | — | — |
| 2020–21 | HC Energie Karlovy Vary | ELH | 8 | 0 | 0 | 0 | 0 | — | — | — | — | — |
| 2020–21 | SK Trhači Kadaň | Czech.1 | 10 | 3 | 0 | 3 | 2 | — | — | — | — | — |
| 2021–22 | HC Energie Karlovy Vary | ELH | 49 | 9 | 5 | 14 | 4 | 3 | 0 | 1 | 1 | 2 |
| 2021–22 | HC Karlovy Vary | CZE U20 | 2 | 2 | 2 | 4 | 4 | 4 | 4 | 1 | 5 | 0 |
| 2022–23 | Rochester Americans | AHL | 62 | 24 | 22 | 46 | 18 | 12 | 7 | 4 | 11 | 2 |
| 2023–24 | Rochester Americans | AHL | 57 | 27 | 18 | 45 | 26 | 5 | 0 | 2 | 2 | 4 |
| 2023–24 | Buffalo Sabres | NHL | 1 | 0 | 0 | 0 | 0 | — | — | — | — | — |
| 2024–25 | Buffalo Sabres | NHL | 62 | 15 | 9 | 24 | 18 | — | — | — | — | — |
| 2024–25 | Rochester Americans | AHL | 4 | 2 | 1 | 3 | 0 | 8 | 2 | 6 | 8 | 4 |
| 2025–26 | Buffalo Sabres | NHL | 12 | 3 | 2 | 5 | 4 | — | — | — | — | — |
| ELH totals | | | 57 | 9 | 5 | 14 | 4 | 3 | 0 | 1 | 1 | 2 |
| NHL totals | | | 75 | 18 | 11 | 29 | 22 | — | — | — | — | — |

=== International ===
| Year | Team | Event | Result | GP | G | A | Pts | PIM |
|---|---|---|---|---|---|---|---|---|
| 2021 | Czech Republic | U18 | 7th | 4 | 0 | 0 | 0 | 0 |
| 2021 | Czech Republic | HG18 | 6th | 4 | 3 | 1 | 4 | 2 |
| 2022 | Czech Republic | U18 | 4th | 6 | 9 | 2 | 11 | 2 |
| 2022 | Czech Republic | WJC | 4th | 7 | 2 | 6 | 8 | 0 |
| 2023 | Czech Republic | WJC | 2nd place, silver medalist(s) | 7 | 7 | 2 | 9 | 2 |
| 2024 | Czech Republic | WJC | 3rd place, bronze medalist(s) | 7 | 6 | 6 | 12 | 0 |
| Junior totals | | | | 35 | 27 | 17 | 44 | 6 |

Awards and achievements
| Preceded by Noah Östlund | Buffalo Sabres first-round draft pick 2022 | Succeeded by Zach Benson |
