= Samuel Honzek =

Slovak ice hockey player (born 2004)

- Born: November 12, 2004 (age 21) Trenčín, Slovakia
- Height: 6 ft 4 in (193 cm)
- Weight: 186 lb (84 kg; 13 st 4 lb)
- Position: Left wing
- Shoots: Left
- NHL team Former teams: Calgary Flames; Dukla Trenčín
- NHL draft: 16th overall, 2023; Calgary Flames
- Playing career: 2020–present

Samuel Honzek (born November 12, 2004) is a Slovak professional ice hockey player who is a left wing for the Calgary Flames of the National Hockey League (NHL).

== Playing career ==
Honzek played parts of two seasons of professional hockey for HK Dukla Trenčín of the Slovak Extraliga before coming to North America to play for the Vancouver Giants in the WHL in order to decrease his time needed to be NHL ready. Regarded as a top prospect in the 2023 NHL entry draft, he was drafted 16th overall by the Calgary Flames.

On July 26, 2023, Honzek signed a three-year entry-level contract with the Flames. During an NHL preseason game for the Flames on October 4, 2023, Honzek sustained a lower body injury, causing him to miss the first 25 games of the 2023–24 WHL season. Upon his return, Honzek was named the captain of the Giants, and recorded 7 points in his first five games before leaving the team to participate in the 2024 World Junior Ice Hockey Championships.

On October 9, 2024, Honzek reached a major milestone in his hockey career by making his NHL debut in a game against the Vancouver Canucks.

== International play ==
Medal record

Representing Slovakia

Ice hockey

Hlinka Gretzky Cup
Silver medal – second place	2021 Czech Republic/Slovakia	

Honzek has represented Slovakia thrice at the IIHF World Junior Championship. During the 2023 IIHF World Junior Championship, Honzek was forced to leave the tournament early after being cut by a skate; an injury that sidelined him for 6 months. He was also a member of the Slovak team at the 2021 Hlinka Gretzky Cup, where his team won a silver medal.

== Career statistics ==
=== Regular season and playoffs ===
			Regular season					Playoffs
Season	Team	League	GP	G	A	Pts	PIM	GP	G	A	Pts	PIM
2020–21	HK Dukla Trenčín	SVK U20	4	1	1	2	2	—	—	—	—	—
2020–21	HK Dukla Trenčín	Slovak	5	0	0	0	0	—	—	—	—	—
2020–21	HK Spartak Dubnica	Slovak.1	8	4	1	5	4	—	—	—	—	—
2021–22	HK Dukla Trenčín	SVK U20	5	1	6	7	0	1	0	1	1	0
2021–22	HK Dukla Trenčín	Slovak	49	10	4	14	8	4	0	0	0	0
2022–23	Vancouver Giants	WHL	43	23	33	56	16	4	1	3	4	0
2023–24	Vancouver Giants	WHL	33	10	21	31	18	5	2	0	2	2
2023–24	Calgary Wranglers	AHL	2	0	0	0	0	1	0	0	0	0
2024–25	Calgary Flames	NHL	5	0	0	0	2	—	—	—	—	—
2024–25	Calgary Wranglers	AHL	52	8	13	21	18	2	0	0	0	0
2025–26	Calgary Flames	NHL	18	2	2	4	2	—	—	—	—	—
NHL totals			23	2	2	4	4	—	—	—	—	—

=== International ===
Year	Team	Event	Result	GP	G	A	Pts	PIM
2021	Slovakia	HG18	2nd place, silver medalist(s)	4	0	0	0	0
2022	Slovakia	U18 D1A	1st	5	4	2	6	0
2022	Slovakia	WJC	9th	4	0	0	0	4
2023	Slovakia	WJC	6th	2	0	0	0	2
2024	Slovakia	WJC	6th	5	3	1	4	2
2025	Slovakia	WC	11th	6	1	1	2	2
Junior totals				20	7	3	10	8
Senior totals				6	1	1	2	2

Awards and achievements
Preceded by Matt Coronato	Calgary Flames first-round draft pick 2023	Succeeded by Zayne Parekh
