= 2024 World Junior Ice Hockey Championships =

2024 edition of the World Junior Ice Hockey Championships

2024 IIHF World Junior Championships

Tournament details
- Host country: Sweden
- Venue(s): Scandinavium and Frölundaborg (in 1 host city)
- Dates: 26 December 2023 – 5 January 2024
- Teams: 10

Final positions
- Champions: United States (6th title)
- Runners-up: Sweden
- Third place: Czechia
- Fourth place: Finland

Tournament statistics
- Games played: 29
- Goals scored: 219 (7.55 per game)
- Attendance: 170,673 (5,885 per game)
- Scoring leader: (Czech Republic) Jiří Kulich (12 points)

Awards
- MVP: (Sweden) Jonathan Lekkerimäki

Official website
- www.iihf.com

The 2024 World Junior Ice Hockey Championships (2024 WJHC) was the 48th edition of the Ice Hockey World Junior Championship, held from 26 December 2023 to 5 January 2024. This was the seventh time Sweden hosted the WJHC, and the first time the competition was held in Gothenburg. The United States won their sixth championship, defeating host Sweden 6–2 in the gold medal game.

== Background ==
On 14 March 2019, it was announced that Gothenburg would be the host city for 2022. However, due to the COVID-19 pandemic, adjustments were made. The 2022 championship was given to Edmonton, the 2023 edition to Halifax and Moncton, and Gothenburg secured hosting rights for 2024.

== Top Division ==
=== Venues ===
Gothenburg		Gothenburg is located in Sweden
Scandinavium Capacity: 12,044	Frölundaborg Capacity: 6,044 (2,430 seated)	Gothenburg is located in Sweden

=== Match officials ===
The following officials were assigned by the International Ice Hockey Federation to officiate the 2024 World Junior Championships.

Referees

- (Sweden) Tobias Björk
- (Finland) Riku Brander
- (Sweden) Daniel Eriksson
- (Switzerland) Micha Hebeisen
- (Germany) Killian Hinterdobler
- (Germany) Lukas Kohlmüller
- (Finland) Joonas Kova
- (Canada) Troy Murray
- (Czech Republic) Jiří Ondráček
- (Canada) Mark Pearce
- (United States) Jack Young
- (Slovakia) Marek Zak

Linesmen

- (Slovakia) Oto Durmis
- (Canada) Jeremy Faucher
- (United States) Shane Gustafson
- (Germany) Tim Heffner
- (Slovakia) Daniel Konc
- (Sweden) Anders Nyqvist
- (Czech Republic) Lukáš Rampir
- (Austria) Simon Riecken
- (Latvia) Davids Rozitis
- (Switzerland) Dominik Schlegel
- (Finland) Jussi Thomann

=== Preliminary round ===
==== Seeding ====
Group A
(Scandinavium)

- Canada (1)
- Sweden (4)
- Finland (5)
- Germany (8)
- Latvia (9)

Group B
(Frölundaborg)

- Czechia (2)
- United States (3)
- Slovakia (6)
- Switzerland (7)
- Norway (11-Promoted)

==== Group A ====
Pos	Team	Pld	W	OTW	OTL	L	GF	GA	GD	Pts	Qualification
1	Sweden (H)	4	3	0	1	0	17	5	+12	10	Advance to quarterfinals
2	Canada	4	3	0	0	1	21	7	+14	9	Advance to quarterfinals
3	Finland	4	1	1	0	2	14	13	+1	5	Advance to quarterfinals
4	Latvia	4	1	0	0	3	6	22	−16	3 (Note: Germany 2–6 Latvia)	Advance to quarterfinals
5	Germany	4	1	0	0	3	9	20	−11	3	Advance to relegation

Source: IIHF
(H) Host
Notes:

26 December 2023; 14:30	Finland	2–5 (0–1, 1–1, 1–3)	Canada	Scandinavium, Gothenburg; Attendance: 9,837

Game reference

Niklas Kokko
Goalies
Mathis Rousseau
Referees:
(Sweden) Tobias Björk
(Sweden) Daniel Eriksson
Linesmen:
(Sweden) Anders Nyqvist
(Czech Republic) Lukáš Rampir

	0–1	16:24 – Danielson (Lamoureux, Mateychuk)
	0–2	33:41 – Allard (Danielson)
Kaskimäki (Kärki, Nyman) (PP) – 35:56	1–2
	1–3	46:38 – Celebrini
	1–4	57:34 – Poitras (Geekie) (ENG)
Lassila (Kärki, Pulkkinen) – 58:56	2–4
	2–5	59:54 – Lamoureux (PP, ENG)

4 min
Penalties
12 min
26
Shots
31

26 December 2023; 19:30	Sweden	6–0 (2–0, 2–0, 2–0)	Latvia	Scandinavium, Gothenburg; Attendance: 11,512

Game reference

Hugo Hävelid
Goalies
Deivs Rolovs
Referees:
(Germany) Lukas Kohlmüller
(Canada) Troy Murray
Linesmen:
(Slovakia) Oto Durmis
(United States) Shane Gustafson

Wahlberg (Sandin Pellikka, Östlund) (PP) – 10:02	1–0
Bystedt (Hävelid, Unger Sörum) (PP) – 17:21	2–0
Lekkerimäki (Öhgren, Östlund) (PP) – 32:45	3–0
Bystedt (O. Pettersson, Forsfjäll) (EA) – 34:30	4–0
Unger Sörum (Lindstein, Stenberg) – 48:39	5–0
Lekkerimäki (Lindstein) – 54:17	6–0

29 min
Penalties
10 min
35
Shots
20

27 December 2023; 14:30	Finland	3–4 (1–1, 2–3, 0–0)	Germany	Scandinavium, Gothenburg; Attendance: 5,077

Game reference

Niklas Kokko
Goalies
Philipp Dietl
Referees:
(Switzerland) Micha Hebeisen
(United States) Jack Young
Linesmen:
(Slovakia) Oto Durmis
(Latvia) Davids Rozitis

	0–1	05:58 – Oswald (Hördler)
Männistö (Bau) – 08:11	1–1
Halttunen – 21:27	2–1
	2–2	22:12 – Hübner (Bicker)
Bau (Hemming) – 23:05	3–2
	3–3	33:07 – Kechter (Elias)
	3–4	34:38 – Oswald (Hauf, Hördler)

8 min
Penalties
8 min
43
Shots
28

27 December 2023; 19:30	Latvia	0–10 (0–2, 0–3, 0–5)	Canada	Scandinavium, Gothenburg; Attendance: 6,321

Game reference

Linards Feldbergs
Aksels Ozols
Goalies
Mathis Rousseau
Referees:
(Finland) Riku Brander
(Czech Republic) Jiří Ondráček
Linesmen:
(Slovakia) Daniel Konc
(Switzerland) Dominik Schlegel

0–1	05:19 – Geekie (Mateychuk, Celebrini) (PP)
0–2	07:11 – Yager (Celebrini, Lamoureux)
0–3	21:17 – Allard (Wood, Bonk) (PP)
0–4	24:46 – Rehkopf (Celebrini)
0–5	30:56 – Celebrini (Wood, Mateychuk)
0–6	42:14 – Minten (Nelson)
0–7	43:51 – Wood
0–8	45:43 – Geekie (Minten, Savoie)
0–9	46:18 – Rehkopf (Celebrini, Dumais)
0–10	50:57 – Poitras (Yager, Nelson)

10 min
Penalties
6 min
22
Shots
41

28 December 2023; 19:30	Germany	0–5 (0–1, 0–1, 0–3)	Sweden	Scandinavium, Gothenburg; Attendance: 11,512

Game reference

Matthias Bittner
Goalies
Melker Thelin
Referees:
(Finland) Riku Brander
(Slovakia) Marek Zak
Linesmen:
(Canada) Jeremy Faucher
(Austria) Simon Riecken

0–1	15:48 – Stenberg (Edstrom)
0–2	38:36 – M. Hävelid (Bystedt, Lindstein)
0–3	46:16 – Stenberg (Unger Sörum, M. Hävelid) (PP)
0–4	49:02 – Stenberg (Edstrom, Unger Sörum)
0–5	54:33 – Östlund (Lekkerimäki)

6 min
Penalties
4 min
15
Shots
41

29 December 2023; 14:30	Latvia	0–4 (0–2, 0–1, 0–1)	Finland	Scandinavium, Gothenburg; Attendance: 6,433

Game reference

Deivs Rolovs
Goalies
Noa Vali
Referees:
(Germany) Killian Hinterdobler
(Germany) Lukas Kohlmüller
Linesmen:
(Canada) Jeremy Faucher
(Czech Republic) Lukáš Rampir

0–1	14:15 – Lassila (Halttunen, Kulonummi) (PP)
0–2	15:13 – Pulkkinen (Hämeenaho, Lassila)
0–3	28:59 – Haltunen (Lassila, Nyman) (PP)
0–4	40:47 – Keskinen (Lassila, Henning) (PP)

12 min
Penalties
12 min
23
Shots
43

29 December 2023; 19:30	Canada	0–2 (0–0, 0–2, 0–0)	Sweden	Scandinavium, Gothenburg; Attendance: 11,512

Game reference
Mathis Rousseau	Goalies	Hugo Hävelid	Referees: (Sweden) Tobias Björk (Canada) Mark Pearce; Linesmen: (Germany) Tim Heffner (Finland) Jussi Thomann
0–1 / 21:53 – Willander (Lindstein, Stenberg); 0–2 / 30:39 – Östlund (Lekkerimäki, Lindstein)			Referees: (Sweden) Tobias Björk (Canada) Mark Pearce; Linesmen: (Germany) Tim Heffner (Finland) Jussi Thomann
8 min	Penalties	4 min	Referees: (Sweden) Tobias Björk (Canada) Mark Pearce; Linesmen: (Germany) Tim Heffner (Finland) Jussi Thomann
21	Shots	24	Referees: (Sweden) Tobias Björk (Canada) Mark Pearce; Linesmen: (Germany) Tim Heffner (Finland) Jussi Thomann

30 December 2023; 19:30	Germany	2–6 (0–3, 1–2, 1–1)	Latvia	Scandinavium, Gothenburg; Attendance: 2,652

Game reference

Philipp Dietl
Matthias Bittner
Goalies
Deivs Rolovs
Referees:
(Finland) Riku Brander
(United States) Jack Young
Linesmen:
(Sweden) Anders Nyqvist
(Austria) Simon Riecken

	0–1	02:45 – Mateiko (Uljanskis, Mots)
	0–2	09:06 – Bukarts (Bulāns, Rullers) (PP)
	0–3	13:23 – Bulāns
Schindler (Nieleck) – 26:30	1–3
	1–4	30:46 – Dārziņš (Ločmelis, Vilmanis)
	1–5	37:44 – Vilmanis (Ločmelis, Bukarts) (PP)
	1–6	46:34 – Vilmanis (Ločmelis)
Panocha (Sumpf, Bicker) – 53:04	2–6

35 min
Penalties
8 min
23
Shots
28

31 December 2023; 14:30	Sweden	4–5 GWS (0–2, 4–1, 0–1) (OT: 0–0) (SO: 1–2)	Finland	Scandinavium, Gothenburg; Attendance: 11,512

Game reference

Melker Thelin
Goalies
Noa Vali
Referees:
(Switzerland) Micha Hebeisen
(Canada) Troy Murray
Linesmen:
(Slovakia) Daniel Konc
(Switzerland) Dominik Schlegel

	0–1	12:25 – Männistö (Halttunen, Keskinen)
	0–2	18:21 – Hämeenaho (Naukkarinen)
Born (Östlund, Willander) – 23:24	1–2
Lekkerimäki (Östlund, Sandin Pellikka) (PP) – 26:38	2–2
	2–3	27:15 – Halttunen (Keskinen, Kulonummi) (PP)
Lindstein (Unger Sörum, Stenberg) – 28:59	3–3
Bystedt (Unger Sörum, M. Hävelid) (PP) – 34:53	4–3
	4–4	58:28 – Nyman (Hämeenaho, Halttunen) (EA)

Lekkerimäki
Edstrom (miss)
Sandin Pellikka (miss)
Östlund (miss)
Öhgren (miss)
Shootout
(miss) Halttunen
(miss) Hämeenaho
(miss) Lassila
Helenius
Nyman
6 min
Penalties
8 min
33
Shots
30

31 December 2023; 19:30	Canada	6–3 (2–1, 0–1, 4–1)	Germany	Scandinavium, Gothenburg; Attendance: 7,327

Game reference

Mathis Rousseau
Goalies
Matthias Bittner
Referees:
(Finland) Joonas Kova
(Slovakia) Marek Zak
Linesmen:
(United States) Shane Gustafson
(Finland) Jussi Thomann

	0–1	02:57 – Lutz (Sinn) (PP)
Celebrini (Nelson, Bonk) – 06:20	1–1
Yager (Danielson, Minten) (PP) – 14:37	2–1
	2–2	21:49 – Kechter (Weber, Lutz) (PP)
Beck (Rehkopf) – 41:40	3–2
	3–3	47:32 – Sumpf (Rollinger, Weber) (PP)
Dumais (Poitras, Rehkopf) (PP) – 48:32	4–3
Celebrini (Yager, Bonk) – 56:02	5–3
Cowan (Allard, Mateychuk) (ENG) – 57:16	6–3

33 min
Penalties
10 min
35
Shots
20

==== Group B ====
Pos	Team	Pld	W	OTW	OTL	L	GF	GA	GD	Pts	Qualification
1	United States	4	3	1	0	0	29	9	+20	11	Advance to quarterfinals
2	Slovakia	4	3	0	0	1	19	16	+3	9	Advance to quarterfinals
3	Czechia	4	2	0	1	1	17	13	+4	7	Advance to quarterfinals
4	Switzerland	4	1	0	0	3	11	20	−9	3	Advance to quarterfinals
5	Norway	4	0	0	0	4	8	26	−18	0	Advance to relegation

Source: IIHF

26 December 2023; 12:00	Slovakia	6–2 (0–1, 2–0, 4–1)	Czechia	Frölundaborg, Gothenburg; Attendance: 984

Game reference

Adam Gajan
Goalies
Michael Hrabal
Referees:
(Finland) Joonas Kova
(Canada) Mark Pearce
Linesmen:
(Switzerland) Dominik Schlegel
(Finland) Jussi Thomann

	0–1	01:01 – Rymon (Becher, Melovský)
Petrovský (Mešár, Kmec) (PP) – 22:00	1–1
Repčík (Kmec) – 38:34	2–1
Honzek (Mišiak, Petrovský) – 41:22	3–1
Žabka (Štrbák) (SH) – 44:15	4–1
Petrovský (Mešár) – 45:22	5–1
	5–2	51:25 – Šapovaliv (Šalé, Kulich)
Štrbák (Pekarčík, Honzek) – 51:55	6–2

10 min
Penalties
16 min
34
Shots
29

26 December 2023; 17:00	United States	4–1 (0–0, 3–0, 1–1)	Norway	Frölundaborg, Gothenburg; Attendance: 1,377

Game reference

Trey Augustine
Goalies
Markus Stensrud
Referees:
(Switzerland) Micha Hebeisen
(Czech Republic) Jiří Ondráček
Linesmen:
(Canada) Jeremy Faucher
(Slovakia) Daniel Konc

Snuggerud (Casey, Fortescue) – 29:59	1–0
Brindley (Perreault, Leonard) (PP) – 34:00	2–0
Brindley (Nazar) – 36:33	3–0
	3–1	44:18 – Vesterheim (SH)
Howard (Gauthier, Hutson) (PP) – 44:43	4–1

10 min
Penalties
12 min
44
Shots
23

27 December 2023; 12:00	Slovakia	3–0 (1–0, 0–0, 2–0)	Switzerland	Frölundaborg, Gothenburg; Attendance: 986

Game reference

Adam Gajan
Goalies
Alessio Beglieri
Referees:
(Sweden) Daniel Eriksson
(Germany) Killian Hinterdobler
Linesmen:
(Germany) Tim Heffner
(Austria) Simon Riecken

Honzek (Repčik) – 08:33	1–0
Repčik (Mešár, Štrbák) (ENG) – 58:19	2–0
Petrovský (SH, ENG) – 59:12	3–0

10 min
Penalties
2 min
20
Shots
36

27 December 2023; 17:00	Norway	1–8 (0–2, 1–3, 0–3)	Czechia	Frölundaborg, Gothenburg; Attendance: 1,258

Game reference

Markus Stensrud
Goalies
Michael Hrabal
Referees:
(Germany) Lukas Kohlmüller
(Slovakia) Mark Zak
Linesmen:
(United States) Shane Gustafson
(Sweden) Anders Nyqvist

	0–1	10:30 – Kulich (Prčík, Šapovaliv)
	0–2	17:46 – Kulich (Melovský, Hamara) (PP)
Haugen (Løkkeberg) – 21:15	1–2
	1–3	32:15 – Čech (Becher)
	1–4	32:52 – Šalé
	1–5	38:46 – Šalé (Melovský, Sapoušek)
	1–6	48:49 – Šapovaliv (Melovský, Kulich) (PP)
	1–7	53:16 – Šalé (Bareš, Rymon) (PP)
	1–8	55:15 – Kulich (Hamara, Štancl)

12 min
Penalties
8 min
21
Shots
40

28 December 2023; 17:00	Switzerland	3–11 (1–5, 0–4, 2–2)	United States	Frölundaborg, Gothenburg; Attendance: 1,458

Game reference

Lorin Grüter
Ewan Huet
Goalies
Jacob Fowler
Referees:
(Finland) Joonas Kova
(Canada) Mark Pearce
Linesmen:
(Czech Republic) Lukáš Rampir
(Finland) Jussi Thomann

	0–1	01:20 – Smith (Buium, Perreault)
	0–2	03:21 – Snuggerud (Gauthier, McGroarty)
	0–3	08:11 – Snuggerud (Gauthier)
Weber (Füllemann, Reinhard) – 09:17	1–3
	1–4	12:36 – Snuggerud (Gauthier, McGroarty)
	1–5	18:29 – Buium (Gauthier, Snuggerud)
	1–6	25:06 – Brindley (Nazar)
	1–7	29:33 – Leonard (Brindley, Casey) (PP)
	1–8	30:04 – Brindley (Nazar, Howard)
	1–9	34:55 – Howard (Hayes)
Christe (Füllemann, Weber) – 41:18	2–9
	2–10	47:09 – Finley (Nazar)
Schild (Muggli, Taibel) – 49:30	3–10
	3–11	54:28 – Pohlkamp (Nazar, Finley) (PP)

8 min
Penalties
4 min
24
Shots
40

29 December 2023; 12:00	Norway	4–8 (1–2, 0–5, 3–1)	Slovakia	Frölundaborg, Gothenburg; Attendance: 1,985

Game reference

Sebastian Aarsund
Martin Lundberg
Goalies
Adam Gajan
Referees:
(Czech Republic) Jiří Ondráček
(United States) Jack Young
Linesmen:
(United States) Shane Gustafson
(Switzerland) Dominik Schliegel

Brandsegg-Nygård – 03:08	1–0
	1–1	13:35 – Honzek (Petrovský, Mišiak) (PP)
	1–2	14:02 – Pekarčík (Dvorský, Čiernik)
	1–3	23:43 – Dvorský (Repčík, Mešár) (PP)
	1–4	26:03 – Petrovský (Štrbák, Mešár)
	1–5	27:10 – Petrovský (Sýkora, Štrbák)
	1–6	32:30 – Repčík (Dvorský, Štrbák) (PP)
	1–7	34:08 – Radivojevič (Mišiak, Petrovský) (PP)
Solberg (Johnsen, Wold) – 48:34	2–7
	2–8	53:40 – Dvorský (Mešár, Kmec)
Vesterheim (Brandsegg-Nygård, Steen) (EA) – 54:22	3–8
Brandsegg-Nygård (Vesterheim, Koch) (PP) – 54:57	4–8

24 min
Penalties
14 min
26
Shots
35

29 December 2023; 17:00	Czechia	3–4 GWS (1–1, 2–2, 0–0) (OT: 0–0) (SO: 1–2)	United States	Frölundaborg, Gothenburg; Attendance: 2,544

Game reference

Michael Hrabal
Goalies
Jacob Fowler
Referees:
(Finland) Joonas Kova
(Canada) Troy Murray
Linesmen:
(Slovakia) Daniel Konc
(Latvia) Davids Rozitis

	0–1	01:12 – Howard (Nazar, Pohlkamp)
Štancl (Rymon) – 15:40	1–1
Bareš (Prčík) – 26:23	2–1
	2–2	28:04 – Smith (Leonard, Perreault)
Sapousek (Šalé, Melovský) – 31:47	3–2
	3–3	34:11 – Chesley (Hutson)

Šalé (miss)
Melovský (miss)
Kulich
Becher (miss)
Šapovaliv (miss)
Kulich (miss)
Šalé (miss)
Shootout
(miss) Gauthier
(miss) Snuggerud
(miss) Leonard
(miss) Hutson
Perreault
(miss) Perreault
Howard
6 min
Penalties
4 min
23
Shots
34

30 December 2023; 17:00	Switzerland	6–2 (1–2, 4–0, 1–0)	Norway	Frölundaborg, Gothenburg; Attendance: 1,009

Game reference

Alessio Beglieri
Goalies
Markus Stensrud
Referees:
(Germany) Killian Hinterdobler
(Czech Republic) Jiří Ondráček
Linesmen:
(Slovakia) Oto Durmis
(Germany) Tim Heffner

S. Meier (Gredig, Ustinkov) – 06:05	1–0
	1–1	17:16 – Johnsen (Magnussen) (PP)
	1–2	18:10 – Dalen (Bakkevig)
Braillard (Ustinkov, Reinhard) (PP) – 25:49	2–2
Taibel (Müller, Terraneo) – 30:16	3–2
Dionicio (Taibel, Weber) (PP) – 31:53	4–2
Schild (Taibel, Müller) – 38:52	5–2
Dionicio (Terraneo, Taibel) – 45:12	6–2

31 min
Penalties
35 min
34
Shots
21

31 December 2023; 12:00	United States	10–2 (2–1, 3–1, 5–0)	Slovakia	Frölundaborg, Gothenburg; Attendance: 1,458

Game reference

Trey Augustine
Goalies
Samuel Urban
Rastislav Eliaš
Referees:
(Sweden) Daniel Eriksson
(Canada) Mark Pearce
Linesmen:
(Sweden) Anders Nyqvist
(Czech Republic) Lukáš Rampir

McGroarty (Moore, Chesley) – 06:21	1–0
	1–1	08:57 – Moško (Repčík)
Buium (Hayes, Rinzel) – 10:13	2–1
Brindley (Hutson, Chesley) (SH) – 20:29	3–1
	3–2	37:50 – Mešár (Petrovský, Kmec) (PP)
Leonard (Smith, Buium) – 38:20	4–2
McGroarty (Fortescue, Gauthier) – 38:54	5–2
McGroarty (Gauthier) – 44:06	6–2
Howard (Nelson, Brindley) – 45:49	7–2
Brindley (Pohlkamp) – 49:15	8–2
Gauthier (Nazar, Hutson) (PP) – 51:00	9–2
Howard (Nazar, Hutson) – 52:42	10–2

29 min
Penalties
6 min
44
Shots
40

31 December 2023; 17:00	Czechia	4–2 (1–0, 1–2, 2–0)	Switzerland	Frölundaborg, Gothenburg; Attendance: 1,592

Game reference

Michael Hrabal
Goalies
Alessio Beglieri
Referees:
(Sweden) Tobias Björk
(Germany) Lukas Kohlmüller
Linesmen:
(Canada) Jeremy Faucher
(Latvia) Davids Rozitis

Šapovaliv (Melovský, Hamara) (PP) – 12:04	1–0
Sapoušek (Becher, Kulich) (EA) – 30:05	2–0
	2–1	34:26 – S. Meier (Dionicio, Terraneo)
	2–2	39:03 – Rod (Weber, Dionicio)
Kulich (Galvas, Melovský) – 52:47	3–2
Hamara (Becher) – 55:18	4–2

4 min
Penalties
2 min
35
Shots
19

=== Relegation ===
4 January 2024; 11:00	Germany	5–4 OT (1–1, 1–1, 2–2) (OT: 1–0)	Norway	Scandinavium, Gothenburg; Attendance: 2,237

Game reference

Matthias Bittner
Goalies
Markus Stensrud
Referees:
(Canada) Troy Murray
(Slovakia) Marek Zak
Linesmen:
(Sweden) Anders Nyqvist
(Czech Republic) Lukáš Rampir

Bicker (Sumpf, Weber) – 09:40	1–0
	1–1	16:10 – Steen (Brandsegg-Nygård, Vesteheim)
Oswald (Hördler, Sinn) –– 28:59	2–1
	2–2	34:43 – Bakke Olsen (Johnsen, Wold)
Sinn (Rollinger, Bicker) – 49:58	3–2
Hübner (Oswald) – 50:46	4–2
	4–3	54:19 – Brandsegg-Nygård (Steen, Vesterheim) (PP)
	4–4	56:06 – Bakke Olsen (Johnsen, Koch)
Elias (Sinn, Oswald) – 60:58	5–4

4 min
Penalties
4 min
27
Shots
28

=== Playoff round ===
Winning teams will be reseeded for the semi-finals in accordance with the following ranking:

1. Higher position in their group
2. Higher number of points in preliminary pool play
3. Better goal differential
4. Higher number of goals scored
5. Better seeding coming into the tournament (final placement at the 2023 World Junior Ice Hockey Championships).

Rank	Team	Group	Pos	Pts	GD	GF	Seed
1	United States	B	1	11	+20	29	3
2	Sweden	A	1	10	+12	17	4
3	Canada	A	2	9	+14	21	1
4	Slovakia	B	2	9	+3	19	6
5	Czechia	B	3	7	+4	17	2
6	Finland	A	3	5	+1	14	5
7	Switzerland	B	4	3	–9	11	7
8	Latvia	A	4	3	–16	6	9

==== Bracket ====
Quarterfinals
2 January – Scandinavium
1A Sweden (OT)	3
4B Switzerland	2
2 January – Frölundaborg
2B Slovakia	3
3A Finland (OT)	4
2 January – Frölundaborg
1B United States	7
4A Latvia	2
2 January – Scandinavium
2A Canada	2
3B Czechia	3

Semifinals
4 January – Scandinavium
1 United States	3
6 Finland	2
4 January – Scandinavium
2 Sweden	5
5 Czechia	2

Final
5 January – Scandinavium
1 United States	6
2 Sweden	2
Third place
5 January – Scandinavium
5 Czechia	8
6 Finland	5

==== Quarterfinals ====
2 January 2024; 12:00	Slovakia	3–4 OT (1–0, 0–1, 2–2) (OT: 0–1)	Finland	Frölundaborg, Gothenburg; Attendance: 2,480

Game reference

Adam Gajan
Goalies
Niklas Kokko
Referees:
(Sweden) Daniel Eriksson
(Canada) Mark Pearce
Linesmen:
(Canada) Jeremy Faucher
(Germany) Tim Heffner

Sýkora (Mešár) – 19:59	1–0
	1–1	22:36 – Männistö
	1–2	40:36 – Hämeenaho (Lassila, Naukkarinen)
Dvorský (Pekarčík, Radivojevič) – 47:09	2–2
	2–3	58:26 – Kaskimäki (Helenius)
Mešár (Štrbák, Dvorský) (EA) – 59:16	3–3
	3–4	60:24 – Lassila (Salin, Nyman)

2 min
Penalties
4 min
30
Shots
28

2 January 2024; 14:30	Canada	2–3 (0–2, 2–0, 0–1)	Czechia	Scandinavium, Gothenburg; Attendance: 10,117

Game reference

Mathis Rousseau
Goalies
Michael Hrabal
Referees:
(Sweden) Tobias Björk
(Switzerland) Micha Hebeisen
Linesmen:
(Slovakia) Oto Durmis
(Sweden) Anders Nyqvist

	0–1	07:51 – Štancl (Rymon)
	0–2	18:01 – Cibulka (Kulich)
Wood (Cowan, Yager) – 23:43	1–2
Furlong (Poitras) – 36:40	2–2
	2–3	59:49 – Štancl (Becher, Rymon)

0 min
Penalties
2 min
30
Shots
22

2 January 2024; 17:00	United States	7–2 (3–1, 3–0, 1–1)	Latvia	Frölundaborg, Gothenburg; Attendance: 2,749

Game reference

Jacob Fowler
Goalies
Deivs Rolovs
Referees:
(Germany) Killian Hinterdobler
(Canada) Troy Murray
Linesmen:
(Slovakia) Daniel Konc
(Switzerland) Dominik Schlegel

Fortescue (Moore, Gauthier) - 1:31	1–0
Perreault (Casey) - 11:42	2–0
	2–1	Ločmelis - 13:50
Nelson (Casey, Snuggerud) - 14:03	3–1
McGroarty (Howard, Hutson) - (PP) - 25:22	4–1
Smith (Perreault, Leonard) - 36:00	5–1
Perreault (Smith, Casey) - 39:39	6–1
Moore (Gauthier) - 46:34	7–1
	7–2	Ločmelis (Fenenko, Vilmanis) - 52:48

4 min
Penalties
8 min
41
Shots
25

2 January 2024; 19:30	Sweden	3–2 OT (2–0, 0–1, 0–1) (OT: 1–0)	Switzerland	Scandinavium, Gothenburg; Attendance: 11,512

Game reference

Hugo Hävelid
Goalies
Alessio Beglieri
Referees:
(Finland) Riku Brander
(Germany) Lukas Kohlmüller
Linesmen:
(United States) Shane Gustafson
(Czech Republic) Lukáš Rampir

Stenberg (M. Hävelid, E. Pettersson) – 01:34	1–0
Lekkerimäki (Öhgren, Wahlberg) (PP) – 18:00	2–0
	2–1	37:26 – Hornecker (Reber)
	2–2	49:10 – Meile (Weber, Christe)
Sandin Pellikka (Lekkerimäki, Östlund) (PP) – 65:22	3–2

2 min
Penalties
10 min
33
Shots
18

==== Semifinals ====
4 January 2024; 15:00	Sweden	5–2 (1–1, 1–1, 3–0)	Czechia	Scandinavium, Gothenburg; Attendance: 11,512

Game reference

Hugo Hävelid
Goalies
Michael Hrabal
Referees:
(Switzerland) Micha Hebeisen
(Canada) Mark Pearce
Linesmen:
(Slovakia) Oto Durmis
(United States) Shane Gustafson

	0–1	06:55 – Melovský (Redlich, Šalé)
Lindstein (Edstrom) – 11:52	1–1
Sandin Pellikka (Salomonsson) – 22:35	2–1
	2–2	27:36 – Cibulka (Bareš, Rymon) (PP)
Lekkerimäki (Sandin Pellikka, Wahlberg) (PP) – 45:14	3–2
Östlund (Lindstein, Willander) – 52:00	4–2
Lekkerimäki (Östlund, Stenberg) – 53:02	5–2

2 min
Penalties
2 min
31
Shots
25

4 January 2024; 19:30	United States	3–2 (0–2, 2–0, 1–0)	Finland	Scandinavium, Gothenburg; Attendance: 10,561

Game reference

Trey Augustine
Goalies
Niklas Kokko
Referees:
(Sweden) Tobias Björk
(Sweden) Daniel Eriksson
Linesmen:
(Canada) Jeremy Faucher
(Germany) Tim Heffner

	0–1	01:51 – Keskinen (Männistö)
	0–2	12:45 – Kumpulainen (Kärki, Bau)
Snuggerud (Casey, Smith) (PP) – 32:10	1–2
Smith (Perreault, Chesley) – 36:16	2–2
Gauthier (Hutson, Brindley) (PP) – 56:47	3–2

4 min
Penalties
4 min
30
Shots
21

==== Bronze medal game ====
5 January 2024; 15:00	Czechia	8–5 (1–2, 2–3, 5–0)	Finland	Scandinavium, Gothenburg; Attendance: 9,647

Game reference

Michael Hrabal
Jakub Vondraš
Goalies
Niklas Kokko
Referees:
(Sweden) Tobias Björk
(Canada) Troy Murray
Linesmen:
(Sweden) Anders Nyqvist
(Czech Republic) Lukáš Rampir

	0–1	06:13 – Kumpulainen
	0–2	07:43 – Nyman (Kaskimäki, Jess Pulkikinen)
Kulich (Melovský, Hamara) (PP) – 16:16	1–2
Štancl (Melovský, Becher) (PP) – 28:37	2–2
	2–3	28:52 – Helenius (Nyman, Kaskimäki)
	2–4	29:11 – Hämeenaho (Kulonummi, Lassila)
	2–5	34:32 – Hämeenaho (Kulonummi, Keskinen) (PP)
Becher (Štancl, Čech) (SH) – 39:05	3–5
Kulich (Melovský, Hamara) (PP) – 44:41	4–5
Becher (Kulich, Šalé) (EA) – 58:04	5–5
Hamara (Kulich, Becher) – 58:19	6–5
Rymon (ENG) – 58:52	7–5
Becher (ENG) – 58:54	8–5

10 min
Penalties
8 min
31
Shots
23

==== Gold medal game ====
5 January 2024; 19:30	United States	6–2 (1–0, 2–2, 3–0)	Sweden	Scandinavium, Gothenburg; Attendance: 11,512

Game reference

Trey Augustine
Goalies
Hugo Hävelid
Referees:
(Switzerland) Micha Hebeisen
(Canada) Mark Pearce
Linesmen:
(Slovakia) Oto Durmis
(United States) Shane Gustafson

Perreault (Smith, McGroarty) (EA) – 16:56	1–0
	1–1	22:13 – Stenberg (M. Hävelid, E. Pettersson)
Howard (Fortescue) – 29:24	2–1
Howard (Brindley) – 34:19	3–1
	3–2	39:55 – Lekkerimäki (Sandin Pellikka, Östlund) (PP)
Buium (Smith, Perreault) – 41:19	4–2
Leonard (Perreault) – 56:12	5–2
McGroarty (Snuggerud) (ENG) – 56:50	6–2

28 min
Penalties
28 min
26
Shots
26

=== Statistics ===
==== Scoring leaders ====
Pos	Player	Country	GP	G	A	Pts	+/−	PIM
1	Jiří Kulich	Czechia	7	6	6	12	+3	0
2	Cutter Gauthier	United States	7	2	10	12	+9	4
3	Matyáš Melovský	Czechia	7	1	10	11	+3	4
4	Jonathan Lekkerimäki	Sweden	7	7	3	10	+2	0
5	Gavin Brindley	United States	7	6	4	10	+7	0
6	Ondřej Becher	Czechia	7	3	7	10	+6	4
6	Noah Östlund	Sweden	7	3	7	10	+3	16
6	Gabe Perreault	United States	7	3	7	10	+4	2
9	Isaac Howard	United States	7	7	2	9	+10	0
10	Servác Petrovský	Slovakia	5	5	4	9	0	0

GP = Games played; G = Goals; A = Assists; Pts = Points; +/− = Plus–minus; PIM = Penalties In Minutes
Source: IIHF.com

==== Goaltending leaders ====
(minimum 40% team's total ice time)

Pos	Player	Country	TOI	GA	GAA	SA	Sv%	SO
1	Trey Augustine	United States	240:00	7	1.75	110	93.64	0
2	Hugo Hävelid	Sweden	305:05	9	1.77	109	91.74	2
3	Adam Gajan	Slovakia	239:52	10	2.50	119	91.60	1
4	Mathis Rousseau	Canada	299:39	10	2.00	114	91.23	1
5	Alessio Beglieri	Switzerland	243:16	10	2.47	107	90.65	0

TOI = Time on ice (minutes:seconds); GA = Goals against; GAA = Goals against average; SA = Shots against; Sv% = Save percentage; SO = Shutouts
Source: IIHF.com

=== Awards ===
- Best players selected by the directorate:
  - Best Goaltender: (Sweden) Hugo Hävelid
  - Best Defenceman: (Sweden) Axel Sandin Pellikka
  - Best Forward: (United States) Cutter Gauthier

- Media All-Stars:
  - MVP: (Sweden) Jonathan Lekkerimäki
  - Goaltender: (Sweden) Hugo Hävelid
  - Defencemen: (United States) Lane Hutson / (Sweden) Theo Lindstein
  - Forwards: (United States) Cutter Gauthier / (Czech Republic) Jiří Kulich / (Sweden) Jonathan Lekkerimäki

=== Final standings ===
Pos	Team	Pld	W	OTW	OTL	L	GF	GA	GD	Pts	Final Result
1	United States	7	6	1	0	0	45	15	+30	20	Champions
2	Sweden	7	4	1	1	1	27	15	+12	15	Runners-up
3	Czechia	7	4	0	1	2	30	25	+5	13	Third Place
4	Finland	7	1	2	0	4	25	27	−2	7	Fourth Place
5	Canada	5	3	0	0	2	23	10	+13	9	Eliminated in quarter-finals
6	Slovakia	5	3	0	1	1	22	20	+2	10	Eliminated in quarter-finals
7	Switzerland	5	1	0	1	3	13	23	−10	4	Eliminated in quarter-finals
8	Latvia	5	1	0	0	4	8	29	−21	3	Eliminated in quarter-finals
9	Germany	5	1	1	0	3	14	24	−10	5	Avoided relegation
10	Norway	5	0	0	1	4	12	31	−19	1	Relegated to the 2025 Division I A

Source: IIHF

== Division I ==
=== Group A ===
The Division I Group A tournament was held in Budapest, Hungary, from 10 to 16 December 2023. Kazakhstan won promotion to the top division for the 2025 World Junior Championships, their first appearance since the 2020 edition of the tournament. Japan was relegated to Division I B for 2025.

Pos	Team	Pld	W	OTW	OTL	L	GF	GA	GD	Pts	Promotion or relegation
1	Kazakhstan	5	4	0	1	0	21	12	+9	13	Promoted to the 2025 Top Division
2	France	5	3	0	0	2	18	19	−1	9 (Note: Denmark 4–6 France)	
3	Denmark	5	3	0	0	2	18	14	+4	9	
4	Austria	5	2	1	0	2	22	21	+1	8	
5	Hungary (H)	5	1	0	1	3	13	16	−3	4	
6	Japan	5	0	1	0	4	12	22	−10	2	Relegated to the 2025 Division I B

Source: IIHF
Rules for classification: 1) points; 2) head-to-head points; 3) head-to-head goal difference; 4) head-to-head number of goals scored; 5) result against closest best-ranked team outside tied teams; 6) result against second-best-ranked team outside tied teams; 7) seeding before tournament.
(H) Host

=== Group B ===
The Division I Group B tournament was held in Bled, Slovenia, from 11 to 17 December 2023. Host nation Slovenia won promotion to Division I A, while Croatia was relegated to Division II A.

Pos	Team	Pld	W	OTW	OTL	L	GF	GA	GD	Pts	Promotion or relegation
1	Slovenia (H)	5	5	0	0	0	25	6	+19	15	Promoted to the 2025 Division I A
2	Ukraine	5	3	1	0	1	23	13	+10	11	
3	Italy	5	2	0	1	2	24	17	+7	7	
4	Estonia	5	2	0	0	3	15	18	−3	6	
5	Poland	5	1	0	1	3	9	19	−10	4	
6	Croatia	5	0	1	0	4	12	35	−23	2	Relegated to the 2025 Division II A

Source: IIHF
Rules for classification: 1) points; 2) head-to-head points; 3) head-to-head goal difference; 4) head-to-head number of goals scored; 5) result against closest best-ranked team outside tied teams; 6) result against second-best-ranked team outside tied teams; 7) seeding before tournament.
(H) Host

== Division II ==
=== Group A ===
The Division II Group A tournament was held in Dumfries, Great Britain, from 11 to 17 December 2023. South Korea was promoted to Division I B, while Spain was relegated to Division II B.

Pos	Team	Pld	W	OTW	OTL	L	GF	GA	GD	Pts	Promotion or relegation
1	South Korea	5	5	0	0	0	29	10	+19	15	Promoted to the 2025 Division I B
2	Lithuania	5	3	1	0	1	27	13	+14	11	
3	Great Britain (H)	5	3	0	1	1	21	12	+9	10	
4	China	5	1	0	0	4	13	20	−7	3 (Note: China 3 Pts +2 GD, Netherlands 3 Pts +1 GD, Spain 3 Pts –3 GD)	
5	Netherlands	5	1	0	0	4	10	25	−15	3	
6	Spain	5	1	0	0	4	8	28	−20	3	Relegated to the 2025 Division II B

Source: IIHF
Rules for classification: 1) points; 2) head-to-head points; 3) head-to-head goal difference; 4) head-to-head number of goals scored; 5) result against closest best-ranked team outside tied teams; 6) result against second-best-ranked team outside tied teams; 7) seeding before tournament.
(H) Host

=== Group B ===
The Division II Group B tournament was held in Belgrade, Serbia, from 14 to 20 January 2024.

Pos	Team	Pld	W	OTW	OTL	L	GF	GA	GD	Pts	Promotion or relegation
1	Romania	5	4	1	0	0	25	5	+20	14	Promoted to the 2025 Division II A
2	Serbia (H)	5	4	0	1	0	21	5	+16	13	
3	Iceland	5	3	0	0	2	21	14	+7	9	
4	Australia	5	2	0	0	3	9	16	−7	6	
5	Belgium	5	1	0	0	4	7	17	−10	3	
6	Chinese Taipei	5	0	0	0	5	8	34	−26	0	Relegated to the 2025 Division III A

Source: IIHF.com
Rules for classification: 1) points; 2) head-to-head points; 3) head-to-head goal difference; 4) head-to-head number of goals scored; 5) result against closest best-ranked team outside tied teams; 6) result against second-best-ranked team outside tied teams; 7) seeding before tournament.
(H) Host

== Division III ==
=== Group A ===
The Division III Group A tournament was held in Sofia, Bulgaria, from 22 to 28 January 2024.

Pos	Team	Pld	W	OTW	OTL	L	GF	GA	GD	Pts	Promotion or relegation
1	Israel	5	5	0	0	0	41	14	+27	15	Promoted to the 2025 Division II B
2	New Zealand	5	3	1	0	1	31	17	+14	11	
3	Bulgaria (H)	5	3	0	1	1	22	19	+3	10	
4	Turkey	5	2	0	0	3	15	19	−4	6	
5	Mexico	5	1	0	0	4	17	20	−3	3	
6	Kyrgyzstan	5	0	0	0	5	9	46	−37	0	Relegated to the 2025 Division III B

Source: IIHF
Rules for classification: 1) points; 2) head-to-head points; 3) head-to-head goal difference; 4) head-to-head number of goals scored; 5) result against closest best-ranked team outside tied teams; 6) result against second-best-ranked team outside tied teams; 7) seeding before tournament.
(H) Host

=== Group B ===
The Division III Group B tournament was held in Sarajevo, Bosnia and Herzegovina, from 25 to 30 January 2024.

Pos	Team	Pld	W	OTW	OTL	L	GF	GA	GD	Pts	Promotion
1	Bosnia and Herzegovina (H)	4	3	1	0	0	30	17	+13	11	Promoted to the 2025 Division III A
2	Luxembourg	4	2	0	1	1	33	13	+20	7	
3	South Africa	4	0	0	0	4	10	43	−33	0	

Source: IIHF
Rules for classification: 1) points; 2) head-to-head points; 3) head-to-head goal difference; 4) head-to-head number of goals scored; 5) result against closest best-ranked team outside tied teams; 6) result against second-best-ranked team outside tied teams; 7) seeding before tournament.
(H) Host
