= Otto Stenberg =

Swedish ice hockey player (born 2005)

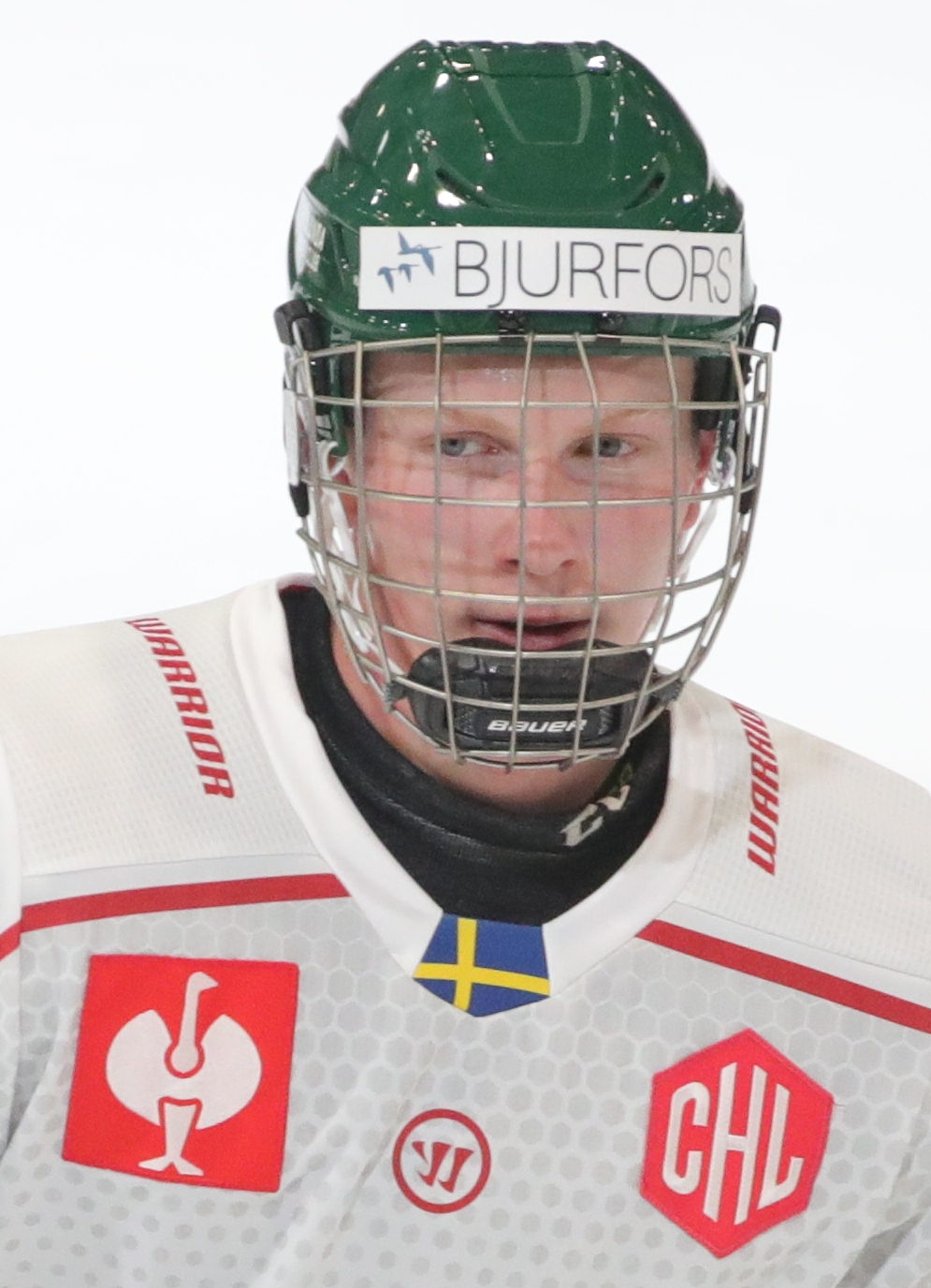
- Born: 29 May 2005 (age 21) Stenungsund, Sweden
- Height: 5 ft 11 in (180 cm)
- Weight: 181 lb (82 kg; 12 st 13 lb)
- Position: Centre
- Shoots: Left
- NHL team (P) Cur. team Former teams: St. Louis Blues; Springfield Thunderbirds (AHL); Frölunda HC; Malmö Redhawks
- NHL draft: 25th overall, 2023; St. Louis Blues
- Playing career: 2022–present

Otto Stenberg (born 29 May 2005) is a Swedish professional ice hockey player who is a centre for the Springfield Thunderbirds of the American Hockey League (AHL) as a prospect to the St. Louis Blues of the National Hockey League (NHL). He was drafted 25th overall by the Blues in the 2023 NHL entry draft.

== Playing career ==
Stenberg played as youth within hometown club, Stenungsund HF, before moving to join Frölunda HC junior system. In the 2021–22 season, Stenberg had 35 points in 38 games for Frölunda's U20 team.

He made his professional debut with Frölunda HC in the Swedish Hockey League (SHL) during the following 2022–23 season.

In the 2023–24 season, Stenberg appeared in 31 regular season games for Frölunda HC, collecting three goals and six points. At the conclusion of the season, on 2 May 2024, Stenberg was signed by the St. Louis Blues to a three-year, entry-level contract.

== International play ==
Medal record

Men's ice hockey

Representing Sweden

World Junior Championships
Silver medal – second place	2024 Sweden	

World U18 Championships
Gold medal – first place	2022 Germany	
Silver medal – second place	2023 Switzerland	

Stenberg represented Sweden as captain at the 2022 Hlinka Gretzky Cup, winning a silver medal.

== Personal life ==
Stenberg's younger brothers, Ivar and Knut are both ice hockey players.

== Career statistics ==
=== Regular season and playoffs ===
			Regular season					Playoffs
Season	Team	League	GP	G	A	Pts	PIM	GP	G	A	Pts	PIM
2021–22	Frölunda HC	J18	12	8	16	24	4	3	3	2	5	0
2021–22	Frölunda HC	J20	38	16	19	35	2	3	2	0	2	0
2022–23	Frölunda HC	J18	6	3	5	8	5	5	5	3	8	6
2022–23	Frölunda HC	J20	29	11	15	26	2	2	0	2	2	2
2022–23	Frölunda HC	SHL	23	1	2	3	0	2	0	0	0	0
2023–24	Frölunda HC	J20	1	0	0	0	0	—	—	—	—	—
2023–24	Frölunda HC	SHL	31	3	3	6	8	1	0	0	0	0
2023–24	BIK Karlskoga	Allsv	9	4	5	9	0	12	5	2	7	9
2024–25	Malmö Redhawks	SHL	25	3	3	6	4	—	—	—	—	—
2024–25	Springfield Thunderbirds	AHL	38	5	12	17	4	3	0	0	0	0
2025–26	St. Louis Blues	NHL	32	3	7	10	5	—	—	—	—	—
2025–26	Springfield Thunderbirds	AHL	36	4	13	17	6	12	0	4	4	8
NHL totals			32	3	7	10	5	—	—	—	—	—
SHL totals			79	7	8	15	12	3	0	0	0	0

=== International ===
Year	Team	Event	Result	GP	G	A	Pts	PIM
2022	Sweden	U18	1st place, gold medalist(s)	6	2	0	2	0
2022	Sweden	HG18	2nd place, silver medalist(s)	6	5	4	9	0
2023	Sweden	U18	2nd place, silver medalist(s)	7	7	9	16	4
2024	Sweden	WJC	2nd place, silver medalist(s)	7	5	4	9	0
2025	Sweden	WJC	4th	7	3	5	8	2
Junior totals				33	22	22	44	6

Awards and achievements
Preceded by Dalibor Dvorský	St. Louis Blues first-round draft pick 2023	Succeeded by Theo Lindstein
