= Mattias Hävelid =

Swedish ice hockey player (born 2004)

- Born: January 1, 2004 (age 22) Täby, Sweden
- Height: 5 ft 11 in (180 cm)
- Weight: 70 lb (32 kg; 5 st 0 lb)
- Position: Defence
- Shoots: Right
- NHL team (P) Cur. team Former teams: San Jose Sharks; San Jose Barracuda (AHL); Linköping HC
- NHL draft: 45th overall, 2022; San Jose Sharks
- Playing career: 2021–present

Mattias Hävelid (born January 1, 2004) is a Swedish professional ice hockey defenceman playing with the San Jose Barracuda in the American Hockey League (AHL) as a prospect with the San Jose Sharks of the National Hockey League (NHL). Hävelid was selected in the second round, 45th overall, by the Sharks in the 2022 NHL entry draft.

== Playing career ==
Hävelid played his entirety as a youth and made his professional debut in his native Sweden, with Linköping HC of the Swedish Hockey League (SHL).

After being selected 45th overall, by the San Jose Sharks in the 2022 NHL entry draft, he signed a three-year deal with the Sharks on 9 May 2025.

== International play ==
Medal record

Representing Sweden

Ice hockey

World Junior Championships
Silver medal – second place	2024 Sweden	

World U18 Championships
Gold medal – first place	2022 Germany	

Hävelid represented Sweden at the 2024 World Junior Ice Hockey Championships and won a silver medal.

== Personal life ==
Mattias is the son of former ice hockey player Niclas Hävelid.

== Career statistics ==
=== Regular season and playoffs ===
			Regular season					Playoffs
Season	Team	League	GP	G	A	Pts	PIM	GP	G	A	Pts	PIM
2019–20	Linköping HC	J18	13	3	4	7	4	—	—	—	—	—
2020–21	Linköping HC	J20	12	0	6	6	6	—	—	—	—	—
2021–22	Linköping HC	J18	2	2	1	3	0	—	—	—	—	—
2021–22	Linköping HC	J20	29	10	9	19	2	8	5	5	10	0
2021–22	Linköping HC	SHL	23	0	0	0	0	—	—	—	—	—
2022–23	Linköping HC	SHL	25	4	2	6	2	—	—	—	—	—
2023–24	Linköping HC	SHL	43	2	10	12	8	—	—	—	—	—
2023–24	Linköping HC	J20	2	1	1	2	0	—	—	—	—	—
2024–25	Linköping HC	SHL	19	0	1	1	4	—	—	—	—	—
2024–25	Djurgårdens IF	Allsv	18	2	12	14	4	14	1	2	3	0
2025–26	San Jose Barracuda	AHL	44	5	10	15	16	—	—	—	—	—
SHL totals			110	6	13	19	14	—	—	—	—	—

=== International ===
Year	Team	Event	Result	GP	G	A	Pts	PIM
2021	Sweden	U18	3rd place, bronze medalist(s)	7	1	3	4	2
2021	Sweden	HG18	3rd place, bronze medalist(s)	5	2	7	9	4
2022	Sweden	U18	1st place, gold medalist(s)	6	4	8	12	0
2024	Sweden	WJC	2nd place, silver medalist(s)	7	1	5	6	2
Junior totals				25	8	23	31	8
