= Dalibor Dvorský =

Slovak ice hockey player (born 2005)

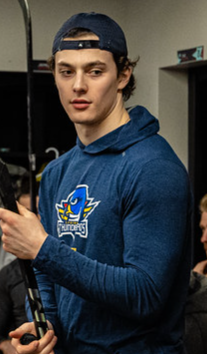
- Dvorský in 2025
- Born: 15 June 2005 (age 21) Zvolen, Slovakia
- Height: 6 ft 1 in (185 cm)
- Weight: 207 lb (94 kg; 14 st 11 lb)
- Position: Centre
- Shoots: Left
- NHL team Former teams: St. Louis Blues; HC '05 Banská Bystrica; IK Oskarshamn
- National team: Slovakia
- NHL draft: 10th overall, 2023; St. Louis Blues
- Playing career: 2021–present

Dalibor Dvorský (born 15 June 2005) is a Slovak professional ice hockey player who is a centre for the St. Louis Blues of the National Hockey League (NHL). He was drafted tenth overall by the Blues in the 2023 NHL entry draft.

== Playing career ==
Playing as a youth within the Swedish and Slovak junior leagues, Dvorský as a part of AIK, opted to join HC '05 Banská Bystrica of the Slovak Extraliga for the remainder of the 2020–21 on 6 January 2021, making his professional debut as a 15 year-old. Dvorský holds the record for the youngest player to score a goal in the men's Slovak league.

Dvorský returned to AIK for the 2021–22 season and was later signed to his first senior team contract, agreeing to a two-year deal, on 7 February 2022.

On 28 June 2023, Dvorský was selected tenth overall by the St. Louis Blues in the 2023 NHL entry draft. He signed a three-year entry-level contract with the Blues on 14 July 2023.

Dvorský began the 2023–24 season in the Swedish Hockey League (SHL) with IK Oskarshamn. However, he struggled to earn ice time, and after ten games had not registered any points. He opted to move to North American to play with Sudbury Wolves in the Ontario Hockey League (OHL). Dvorský made his debut with the Wolves on October 20, 2023, scoring his first OHL goal in a 4–3 loss to the Flint Firebirds. Despite appearing in only 52 regular season games, he managed a team-leading 45 goals. His shooting percentage of 26.8% was the highest in the OHL. In recognition of his achievements, he was named to the league's First All-Star Team for the 2023–24 season. Dvorský had three goals and seven assists in nine playoff games. The postseason ended in disappointment after the Wolves were swept in the second round by the North Bay Battalion, but he nonetheless called his time in Sudbury "amazing".

Dvorský was recalled to St. Louis on March 22, 2025, after putting up 20 goals and 23 assists in 57 games for the Springfield Thunderbirds, and made his NHL debut against the Nashville Predators the next day on March 23. He scored his first NHL goal on 4 November 2025 against the Edmonton Oilers.

== International play ==
Dvorský won a gold medal with Slovakia at the 2022 World U18 Division IA Championships, scoring 11 points in five games.

== Personal life ==
As he played in Sweden in junior leagues, Dvorský is fluent in the Swedish language.

== Career statistics ==
=== Regular season and playoffs ===
			Regular season					Playoffs
Season	Team	League	GP	G	A	Pts	PIM	GP	G	A	Pts	PIM
2020–21	AIK	J18	6	4	10	14	0	—	—	—	—	–
2020–21	HC '05 Banská Bystrica	Slovak	20	2	2	4	8	—	—	—	—	—
2021–22	AIK	J20	33	20	20	40	43	6	1	5	6	2
2021–22	AIK	Allsv	17	2	1	3	0	—	—	—	—	—
2021–22	AIK	J18	—	—	—	—	–	1	0	1	1	0
2022–23	AIK	J20	10	10	11	21	2	—	—	—	—	—
2022–23	AIK	Allsv	38	6	8	14	16	7	0	0	0	0
2023–24	IK Oskarshamn	SHL	10	0	0	0	0	—	—	—	—	—
2023–24	Sudbury Wolves	OHL	52	45	43	88	17	9	3	7	10	2
2024–25	Springfield Thunderbirds	AHL	61	21	24	45	22	3	0	2	2	0
2024–25	St. Louis Blues	NHL	2	0	0	0	0	—	—	—	—	—
2025–26	Springfield Thunderbirds	AHL	6	3	2	5	4	—	—	—	—	—
2025–26	St. Louis Blues	NHL	71	12	9	21	26	—	—	—	—	—
Slovak totals			20	2	2	4	8	—	—	—	—	—
NHL totals			73	12	9	21	26	—	—	—	—	—

=== International ===
Year	Team	Event	Result	GP	G	A	Pts	PIM
2021	Slovakia	HG18	2nd place, silver medalist(s)	5	8	4	12	2
2022	Slovakia	U18 D1A	1st place, gold medalist(s)	5	5	6	11	4
2022	Slovakia	WJC	9th	4	1	1	2	0
2023	Slovakia	WJC	6th	5	1	2	3	0
2023	Slovakia	U18	4th	7	8	5	13	6
2024	Slovakia	WJC	6th	5	3	3	6	0
2025	Slovakia	WJC	6th	5	5	4	9	0
2025	Slovakia	WC	11th	6	0	1	1	0
2026	Slovakia	OG	4th	6	3	3	6	0
Junior totals				36	31	25	56	12
Senior totals				12	3	4	7	0

== Awards and honours ==
Award	Year	Ref
OHL
First All-Star Team	2024	

Awards and achievements
Preceded by Jimmy Snuggerud	St. Louis Blues first-round draft pick 2023	Succeeded by Otto Stenberg
