= Jesse Pulkkinen =

Finnish ice hockey player (born 2004)

- Born: 27 December 2004 (age 21) Laukaa, Finland
- Height: 6 ft 7 in (201 cm)
- Weight: 220 lb (100 kg; 15 st 10 lb)
- Position: Defence
- Shoots: Left
- NHL team Former teams: New York Islanders; JYP Jyväskylä
- NHL draft: 54th overall, 2024; New York Islanders
- Playing career: 2023–present

Jesse Pulkkinen (born 27 December 2004) is a Finnish professional ice hockey player who is a defenceman as a prospect to the New York Islanders of the National Hockey League (NHL). Pulkkinen was selected by the Islanders with the 54th overall pick in the 2024 NHL entry draft.

== Playing career ==
Pulkkinen played in his native Finland as a youth within JYP Jyväskylä, and made his professional debut in the Liiga with JYP during the 2023–24 season.

On 15 July 2024, Pulkkinen signed a three-year, entry-level contract with the New York Islanders.

== International play ==
Pulkkinen represented Finland at the 2024 World Junior Championships where he recorded one goal and two assists in seven games.

== Career statistics ==
=== Regular season and playoffs ===
			Regular season					Playoffs
Season	Team	League	GP	G	A	Pts	PIM	GP	G	A	Pts	PIM
2021–22	JYP	U20	2	0	0	0	0	—	—	—	—	—
2022–23	JYP	U20	43	0	4	4	18	—	—	—	—	—
2023–24	JYP	U20	18	11	17	28	47	7	4	6	10	22
2023–24	JYP	Liiga	29	2	6	8	24	—	—	—	—	—
2023–24	KeuPa	Mestis	6	2	2	4	2	—	—	—	—	—
2024–25	JYP	U20	2	1	4	5	2	—	—	—	—	—
2024–25	JYP	Liiga	38	3	5	8	26	—	—	—	—	—
2024–25	Bridgeport Islanders	AHL	10	0	1	1	2	—	—	—	—	—
2025–26	Bridgeport Islanders	AHL	20	0	2	2	6	—	—	—	—	—
2025–26	Worcester Railers	ECHL	36	9	9	18	14	—	—	—	—	—
Liiga totals			67	5	11	16	50	—	—	—	—	—

=== International ===
Year	Team	Event	Result	GP	G	A	Pts	PIM
2024	Finland	WJC	4th	7	1	2	2	8
Junior totals				7	1	2	3	8
