= Drew Fortescue =

American ice hockey player (born 2005)

- Born: April 28, 2005 (age 21) Pearl River, New York, U.S.
- Height: 6 ft 2 in (188 cm)
- Weight: 195 lb (88 kg; 13 st 13 lb)
- Position: Defense
- Shoots: Left
- NHL team (P) Cur. team: New York Rangers; Hartford Wolf Pack (AHL)
- NHL draft: 90th overall, 2023; New York Rangers
- Playing career: 2026–present

Drew Fortescue (born April 28, 2005) is an American professional ice hockey player who is a defenseman for the Hartford Wolf Pack of the American Hockey League (AHL) as a prospect to the New York Rangers of the National Hockey League (NHL). Fortescue was drafted in the third round, 90th overall, by the Rangers in the 2023 NHL entry draft.

== Playing career ==
Before playing for Boston College, he was in the USA Hockey National Team Development Program (USNTDP). He also played youth hockey for the Mid-Fairfield Rangers of Connecticut's Mid-Fairfield Youth Hockey Association, where he was coached by former NHL star Martin St. Louis, who he credits for helping his development. On the Mid-Fairfield Rangers, Fortescue was a teammate of Luke Drury, the nephew of Rangers general manager Chris Drury who later drafted him. He also played for Don Bosco Preparatory High School.

Fortescue was drafted by the New York Rangers in the third round of the 2023 NHL entry draft with the 90th overall pick. The Rangers traded a 7th round draft pick to move up one spot in the draft to make sure they could draft Fortescue.

In 2023–24, his freshman season at Boston College, Fortescue recorded four goals and four assists with a +13 plus/minus rating. As a sophomore in 2024–25, he had 11 assists and a +28 rating. Despite his improvement, he chose not to sign a professional contract with the Rangers in order to return to college for his junior year. Fortescue said of the decision:

Obviously, your goal is to [go pro]. But I think what’s best for me, and talking to those guys in the player development staff, and being on the same page as all of them, my goal is to focus on the year coming up and we’ll see what happens going forward. Talking to everyone here, and on my end, too, it's when I'm ready. It's what they want as well. But I think putting on that weight, being a little bit more physically ready, is [important].

His offensive numbers improved to four goals and 10 assists for 14 points in the 2025–26 season at Boston College, while still playing on the team's top defensive pairing. He signed a three-year, entry-level contract with the Rangers on March 21, 2026, at the end of the Boston College season. He made his NHL debut for the Rangers on March 27, against the Chicago Blackhawks and picked up an assist on a goal by Jonny Brodzinski. In 9 games for the Rangers he was on ice for 8 Ranger goals and 4 opponent goals for a 66.7% goals-for percentage, best of any Ranger albeit in very a small sample size.

Fortescue was sent to the Rangers' American Hockey League affiliate, the Hartford Wolf Pack, to begin the 2026-27 season. He scored his first professional goal for Hartford on November 7, 2026 against the Syracuse Crunch, which was the game winning goal in overtime.

== International play ==
Medal record

Men's ice hockey

Representing the United States

World Junior Championships
| Gold medal – first place | 2024 Sweden | |
| Gold medal – first place | 2025 Canada | |

World U18 Championships
| Gold medal – first place | 2023 Switzerland | |

He won a gold medal for the United States at the 2023 World U18 Championships. He had a goal and two assists, as well as a +9 rating, in the tournament.

He was selected to the United States junior team at the 2024 World Junior Championships and won a gold medal. He had a goal and three assists during the tournament, including an assist in the final against Sweden.

He was later included on the roster of the United States team for the 2025 World Junior Championships and won a second gold medal. Fortescue had no points in the tournament but played on United States' top defense pairing and wound up with a +6 rating, tied for third-best among tournament defensemen.

During the semifinal game of the 2025 World Junior Championships, the The Sports Network announcers said that "Sometimes you don't notice him in a game and it's because he's doing everything right. He's always in position and plays it simple. He's a Rangers draft pick — a good, solid, reliable defender coming your way pretty soon."

== Playing style ==
Prior to the 2024–25 season, USA Today writer Vincent Z. Mercogliano rated Fortescue as the Rangers' sixth-best prospect, The Hockey News rated him as the Rangers' fifth-best prospect, and McKeen's Hockey rated him as the Rangers' ninth-best prospect. He is a reliable stay-at-home defenseman who has not produced much offense. He is also a strong penalty killer. The Hockey News said "He makes life hard for the opposition and uses his stick well." Scout Jess Rubenstein rated him as the Rangers' best defenseman prospect entering the 2024–25 season and said "I like his size and on-ice vision. He plays a clean, physical game but needs more offense." One NHL executive compared him to Rangers' defenseman Ryan Lindgren. Boston College associate head coach Brendan Buckley particularly praised Fortescue's breakout passes and said "He is exceptional at going back and getting pucks and making a good first touch with pucks and I think that is so valuable in today's hockey, being able to have a reliable defenseman back there that can get pucks and move them quickly up to his forwards." According to Eagles' head coach Greg Brown:

He was relied on in key situations. Right away as a freshman, he showed that he could handle playing against the other team's top players...He's very good at breaking pucks out. He can see his options quickly and find the open guy. I think that was probably his one of his top strengths...He had no fear in finding the middle if that was the right play, and he could execute on a high level."

Before the 2025–26 season, Mercogliano and Peter Baugh of The Athletic rated Fortescue as the Rangers' seventh-best prospect. The Hockey News writer Stan Fischler also rated him as the Rangers' seventh-best prospect. Brown said of Fortescue before the season that "He eats a ton of minutes against the top forwards in all of college hockey. He's very effective and efficient, and has the mental game to read very well and understand what he needs to do to defend."

== Personal life ==
Fortescue's cousin C.J. McGee is a professional ice hockey defenseman with the Savannah Ghost Pirates of the ECHL. Another cousin, Liam McLinskey, plays for the Charlotte Checkers of the American Hockey League (AHL) and was a top 10 finalist for the Hobey Baker Award while playing in college for the Holy Cross Crusaders.

== Career statistics ==
=== Regular season and playoffs ===
| | | | Regular season | | | | | Playoffs |
| Season | Team | League | GP | G | A | Pts | PIM | GP | G | A | Pts | PIM |
|---|---|---|---|---|---|---|---|---|---|---|---|---|
| 2021–22 | U.S. National Development Team | USHL | 34 | 2 | 6 | 8 | 16 | — | — | — | — | — |
| 2022–23 | U.S. National Development Team | USHL | 22 | 0 | 5 | 5 | 6 | — | — | — | — | — |
| 2023–24 | Boston College | HE | 40 | 4 | 4 | 8 | 36 | — | — | — | — | — |
| 2024–25 | Boston College | HE | 36 | 0 | 11 | 11 | 42 | — | — | — | — | — |
| 2025–26 | Boston College | HE | 36 | 4 | 10 | 14 | 47 | — | — | — | — |
| 2025–26 | New York Rangers | NHL | 9 | 0 | 2 | 2 | 4 | — | — | — | — | — |
| NHL totals | | | 9 | 0 | 2 | 2 | 4 | — | — | — | — | — |

=== International ===
| Year | Team | Event | Result | GP | G | A | Pts | PIM |
|---|---|---|---|---|---|---|---|---|
| 2023 | United States | U18 | 1st place, gold medalist(s) | 7 | 1 | 2 | 3 | 6 |
| 2024 | United States | WJC | 1st place, gold medalist(s) | 7 | 1 | 3 | 4 | 6 |
| 2025 | United States | WJC | 1st place, gold medalist(s) | 7 | 0 | 0 | 0 | 4 |
| Junior totals | | | | 21 | 2 | 5 | 7 | 16 |
