= Gleb Trikozov =

Russian ice hockey player (born 2004)

- Born: August 12, 2004 (age 21) Omsk, Russia
- Height: 6 ft 2 in (188 cm)
- Weight: 201 lb (91 kg; 14 st 5 lb)
- Position: Winger
- Shoots: Right
- NHL team (P) Cur. team Former teams: Carolina Hurricanes; Chicago Wolves (AHL); Avangard Omsk
- NHL draft: 60th overall, 2022; Carolina Hurricanes
- Playing career: 2021–present

Gleb Trikozov (Russian: Глеб Трикозов, born August 12, 2004) is a Russian professional ice hockey player who is a winger for the Chicago Wolves of the American Hockey League (AHL) while under contract to the Carolina Hurricanes of the National Hockey League (NHL). He was drafted in the second round, 60th overall, by the Hurricanes in the 2022 NHL entry draft.

== Playing career ==
Trikozov played in Russia's Junior Hockey League (MHL) in the 2020–21 season, recording 15 goals and 31 points with Omskie Yastreby. In April 2021, Trikozov signed a three-year contract with Avangard Omsk of the Kontinental Hockey League (KHL), his junior club's senior-level affiliate.

Trikozov split the 2021–22 season between the MHL and the Supreme Hockey League (VHL), the second tier of Russian professional hockey. He appeared in 35 MHL games, recording 23 goals and 45 points. In the VHL, he appeared in 11 games for Omskie Krylia, Avangard's farm club. In the 2022 Kharlamov Cup playoffs, Trikozov and Omskie Yastreby made it to the semifinals.

Entering the 2022 NHL entry draft, Trikozov's skating, shot, and high upside led him to be projected as a selection in the late first or early second round. He fell slightly compared to these projections, being selected in the second round, 60th overall, by the Carolina Hurricanes, Carolina's first selection of the draft.

In the 2022–23 season, Trikozov played mostly at the MHL level, although he also appeared in the VHL and in one KHL game. He split his time between the three leagues in the 2023–24 season as well, appearing in two KHL games. On April 5, 2024, Trikozov and Avangard mutually terminated his contract. The following day, he signed a three-year, entry-level contract with the Hurricanes.

== International play ==
Medal record

Representing Russia

Men's ice hockey

Hlinka Gretzky Cup
Gold medal – first place	2021 Slovakia/Czech Republic	

Trikozov represented Russia at the 2021 Hlinka Gretzky Cup, scoring a goal and five points in five games as Russia won the tournament.

== Career statistics ==
=== Regular season and playoffs ===
			Regular season					Playoffs
Season	Team	League	GP	G	A	Pts	PIM	GP	G	A	Pts	PIM
2020–21	Omskie Yastreby	MHL	49	15	15	30	39	—	—	—	—	—
2021–22	Omskie Krylia	VHL	11	1	1	2	0	—	—	—	—	—
2021–22	Omskie Yastreby	MHL	35	23	22	45	22	13	10	8	18	6
2022–23	Avangard Omsk	KHL	1	0	0	0	0	—	—	—	—	—
2022–23	Omskie Krylia	VHL	25	5	5	10	4	—	—	—	—	—
2022–23	Omskie Yastreby	MHL	25	14	15	29	2	17	7	9	16	10
2023–24	Avangard Omsk	KHL	2	0	0	0	0	—	—	—	—	—
2023–24	Omskie Krylia	VHL	39	11	10	21	18	—	—	—	—	—
2023–24	Omskie Yastreby	MHL	10	12	6	18	4	7	4	5	9	4
2024–25	Chicago Wolves	AHL	20	2	1	3	4	—	—	—	—	—
2025–26	Chicago Wolves	AHL	46	7	4	11	33	—	—	—	—	—
KHL totals			3	0	0	0	0	—	—	—	—	—

=== International ===
Year	Team	Event	Result	GP	G	A	Pts	PIM
2021	Russia	HG18	1st place, gold medalist(s)	5	1	4	5	6
Junior totals				5	1	4	5	6
