= Jonathan Lekkerimäki =

Swedish ice hockey player (born 2004)

- Born: 24 July 2004 (age 22) Huddinge, Sweden
- Height: 5 ft 11 in (180 cm)
- Weight: 172 lb (78 kg; 12 st 4 lb)
- Position: Right wing
- Shoots: Right
- NHL team Former teams: Vancouver Canucks; Djurgårdens IF; Örebro HK
- NHL draft: 15th overall, 2022; Vancouver Canucks
- Playing career: 2021–present

Jonathan Lekkerimäki (born 24 July 2004) is a Swedish professional ice hockey right winger for the Vancouver Canucks of the National Hockey League (NHL). He was drafted 15th overall by the Canucks in the 2022 NHL entry draft.

== Playing career ==
Lekkerimäki made his professional debut for Djurgårdens IF during the 2021–22 season, where he recorded seven goals and two assists in 26 games. This made Lekkerimäki the second most-productive 17-year-old goal-scorer in SHL history after Peter Forsberg, who had seven goals in 23 games. He also appeared in 26 games for Djurgården's J20 team where he recorded 20 goals and 15 assists. He missed the last month of the season due to mononucleosis.

On 1 July 2022, Lekkerimäki was drafted in the second round, 70th overall, by the Vancouver Giants in the CHL Import Draft. Opting to remain in Sweden and continue his development with Djurgården's first season in the Allsvenskan in the 2022–23 season, Lekkerimäki recorded three goals and six assists in 29 games before missing the remainder of the regular season due to a foot injury. Returning for the playoffs, he recorded at a point-per-game pace through 15 games, before falling short of promotion to the SHL in a game 7 finals defeat to Modo Hockey.

On 6 May 2023, Lekkerimäki signed a three-year, entry-level contract with the Vancouver Canucks. In order to continue his progress in development, Lekkerimäki left Djurgården and signed a two-year contract with SHL club, Örebro HK, on loan from the Canucks on 16 May 2023.

During the 2023–24 season, he recorded 19 goals and 12 assists in 46 games. Following the season he was named SHL Rookie of the Year, won the Elite Prospects Award as top SHL junior-aged player, and at the European Hockey Awards he won the Young Player of the Year Award. Lekkerimäki was also named MVP of the Season by the fans of Örebro HK, 14-3 Örebro.

On 25 March 2024, he was assigned to the Abbotsford Canucks of the AHL.

Lekkerimäki made his NHL debut on 12 November 2024, against the Calgary Flames. He had his first NHL goal in his second NHL game on 14 November 2024, against the New York Islanders.

After a playoff run marred by injury and healthy scratches, Lekkerimäki scored the game-winning goal in Game 4 of the 2025 Calder Cup Final, en route to the Abbotsford Canucks' first Calder Cup.

== International play ==
Medal record

Representing Sweden

Ice hockey

World Junior Championships
Silver medal – second place	2024 Sweden	
Bronze medal – third place	2022 Canada	

World U18 Championships
Gold medal – first place	2022 Germany	

Lekkerimäki represented Sweden at the 2022 IIHF World U18 Championships where he led the tournament in scoring with five goals and ten assists in six games and won a gold medal.

Lekkerimäki represented Sweden at the 2024 World Junior Ice Hockey Championships where he led the team in scoring and recorded seven goals and three assists in seven games and won a silver medal. He scored the game-winning-goal against Team Czechia to send Team Sweden to the gold medal game. He was subsequently named tournament MVP.

== Personal life ==
Lekkerimäki is of Finnish descent through his Finnish grandmother, who had moved to Sweden from Kuusamo, Finland, in the 1960s; accordingly, his surname is of Finnish origin.

== Career statistics ==
=== Regular season and playoffs ===
			Regular season					Playoffs
Season	Team	League	GP	G	A	Pts	PIM	GP	G	A	Pts	PIM
2019–20	Djurgårdens IF	J18	58	30	15	45	20	—	—	—	—	—
2020–21	Djurgårdens IF	J18	8	12	4	16	0	—	—	—	—	—
2020–21	Djurgårdens IF	J20	1	0	1	1	0	—	—	—	—	—
2021–22	Djurgårdens IF	J20	26	20	15	35	8	—	—	—	—	—
2021–22	Djurgårdens IF	SHL	26	7	2	9	0	—	—	—	—	—
2022–23	Djurgårdens IF	J20	2	2	3	5	0	—	—	—	—	—
2022–23	Djurgårdens IF	Allsv	29	3	6	9	4	15	5	10	15	2
2023–24	Örebro HK	SHL	46	19	12	31	10	3	0	1	1	0
2023–24	Abbotsford Canucks	AHL	6	1	1	2	0	—	—	—	—	—
2024–25	Abbotsford Canucks	AHL	36	19	9	28	0	16	3	4	7	4
2024–25	Vancouver Canucks	NHL	24	3	3	6	2	—	—	—	—	—
2025–26	Vancouver Canucks	NHL	13	2	1	3	0	—	—	—	—	—
2025–26	Abbotsford Canucks	AHL	21	13	7	20	8	—	—	—	—	—
SHL totals			72	26	14	40	10	3	0	1	1	0
NHL totals			37	5	4	9	2	—	—	—	—	—

=== International ===
Year	Team	Event	Result	GP	G	A	Pts	PIM
2021	Sweden	HG18	3rd place, bronze medalist(s)	5	5	0	5	4
2022	Sweden	U18	1st place, gold medalist(s)	6	5	10	15	4
2022	Sweden	WJC	3rd place, bronze medalist(s)	7	0	3	3	0
2023	Sweden	WJC	4th	7	1	3	4	4
2024	Sweden	WJC	2nd place, silver medalist(s)	7	7	3	10	0
Junior totals				32	18	19	37	12

== Awards and honours ==
Award	Year	Ref
SHL
Rookie of the Year	2024	
AHL
Calder Cup champion	2025	
International
World Junior Championship MVP	2024	
World Junior Championship Media All-Star Team	2024	

Awards and achievements
Preceded by Vasily Podkolzin	Vancouver Canucks first-round draft pick 2022	Succeeded by Tom Willander
Preceded by Filip Bystedt	Winner of the SHL Rookie of the Year award 2024	Succeeded by Incumbent
