= Theo Lindstein =

Swedish ice hockey player (born 2005)

- Born: 5 January 2005 (age 21) Gävle, Sweden
- Height: 185 cm (6 ft 1 in)
- Weight: 82 kg (181 lb; 12 st 13 lb)
- Position: Defence
- Shoots: Left
- NHL team Former teams: St. Louis Blues; Brynäs IF
- NHL draft: 29th overall, 2023; St. Louis Blues
- Playing career: 2022–present

Theo Lindstein (born 5 January 2005) is a Swedish professional ice hockey player who is a defenceman for the St. Louis Blues of the National Hockey League (NHL). Lindstein was drafted 29th overall by the Blues in the 2023 NHL entry draft.

== Playing career ==
Lindstein's professional career began in the 2021–22 season with Brynäs IF in the Swedish Hockey League (SHL). Lindstein appeared in 12 games, in which he scored one point, which was an assist. In the 2022–23 season, He appeared in 32 games and doubled his points, scoring one goal and an assist for two points. He was signed to a one-year extension with Brynäs on 14 April 2023, opted to remain with the relegated club to the HockeyAllsvenskan for the following season.

The following season Lindstein appeared in 49 regular season HockeyAllsvenskan games, scoring 15 points, and then all 13 playoff games, scoring four points as Brynäs earned promotion back to the SHL. He was signed to a three-year, entry-level contract with draft club, the St. Louis Blues, on 21 March 2024. On 9 March 2026, Lindstein was recalled from the Springfield Thunderbirds of the American Hockey League (AHL), and he made his NHL debut the next day. On 30 March 2026, in his 10th NHL game, Lindstein scored his first career NHL goal in a 5–4 loss against the San Jose Sharks. Lindstein finished the 25-26 season with 2 goals and 2 assists in 17 games played. After beginning the 2026–27 season with the Blues, Lindstein was assigned to the Springfield Thunderbirds on October 22. He was recalled on October 30 and replaced Colton Parayko in the lineup after Parayko sustained an upper-body injury against the Boston Bruins.

== International play ==
Medal record

Men's ice hockey

Representing Sweden

World Junior Championships
Silver medal – second place	2024 Sweden	

Lindstein represented Sweden at the 2024 World Junior Championships and won a silver medal.

== Career statistics ==
=== Regular season and playoffs ===
			Regular season					Playoffs
Season	Team	League	GP	G	A	Pts	PIM	GP	G	A	Pts	PIM
2021–22	Brynäs IF	J20	34	1	3	4	4	—	—	—	—	—
2021–22	Brynäs IF	SHL	12	0	1	1	0	—	—	—	—	—
2022–23	Brynäs IF	J20	14	2	5	7	4	—	—	—	—	—
2022–23	Brynäs IF	SHL	32	1	1	2	0	—	—	—	—	—
2023–24	Brynäs IF	J20	2	0	2	2	0	—	—	—	—	—
2023–24	Brynäs IF	Allsv	49	4	11	15	4	13	1	3	4	0
2024–25	Brynäs IF	SHL	44	4	5	9	6	17	2	3	5	0
2025–26	Springfield Thunderbirds	AHL	59	6	8	14	18	9	0	3	3	2
2025–26	St. Louis Blues	NHL	17	2	2	4	6	—	—	—	—	—
NHL totals			17	2	2	4	6	—	—	—	—	—
SHL totals			88	5	7	12	10	17	2	3	5	0

=== International ===
Year	Team	Event	Result	GP	G	A	Pts	PIM
2022	Sweden	U18	1st place, gold medalist(s)	5	0	0	0	2
2022	Sweden	HG18	2nd place, silver medalist(s)	5	1	5	6	0
2023	Sweden	U18	2nd place, silver medalist(s)	7	1	4	5	0
2024	Sweden	WJC	2nd place, silver medalist(s)	7	2	6	8	0
2025	Sweden	WJC	4th	7	0	4	4	2
Junior totals				31	4	19	23	4

Awards and achievements
Preceded by Otto Stenberg	St. Louis Blues first-round draft pick 2023	Succeeded by Adam Jiříček
