= Noah Östlund =

Swedish ice hockey player (born 2004)

- Born: 11 March 2004 (age 22) Nykvarn, Sweden
- Height: 5 ft 11 in (180 cm)
- Weight: 180 lb (82 kg; 12 st 12 lb)
- Position: Centre
- Shoots: Left
- NHL team Former teams: Buffalo Sabres; Djurgårdens IF; Växjö Lakers
- NHL draft: 16th overall, 2022; Buffalo Sabres
- Playing career: 2021–present

Noah Östlund (born 11 March 2004) is a Swedish professional ice hockey player who is a centre for the Buffalo Sabres of the National Hockey League (NHL). He was drafted 16th overall by the Sabres in the 2022 NHL entry draft.

== Playing career ==
Östlund made his professional debut for Djurgårdens IF during the 2021–22 season, where he appeared in 11 games. He also appeared in 32 games for Djurgårdens' J20 team, where he recorded nine goals and 33 assists.

Following his selection in the 2022 NHL entry draft, Östlund was signed by the Buffalo Sabres to a three-year, entry-level contract on 16 July 2022. He was returned on loan to continue his development in Sweden with Djurgårdens IF in the HockeyAllsvenskan.

Unable to help Djurgårdens IF gain promotion, after losing the Allsvenskan finals to Modo Hockey, Östlund left the club and was loaned by the Sabres to continue his development in the top-level Swedish Hockey League with reigning champions, Växjö Lakers, for the 2023–24 season on 4 June 2023.

After spending most of the 2024–25 season in the American Hockey League (AHL) with the Rochester Americans, Östlund was called up to the Sabres on 4 April 2025. Östlund would later make his NHL debut on 5 April against the Tampa Bay Lightning.

While Östlund opened the 2025–26 season with Rochester, he received two call-ups early on as multiple Buffalo forwards picked up injuries. Östlund nabbed his first multi-goal game with two against the Edmonton Oilers on 17 November 2025. The centre received praise during the season's opening months for his offensive playmaking ability, skating, passing vision and stickhandling.

On 14 September 2026, Östlund signed an eight-year, $52.8 million extension with the Sabres, two days before the new NHL collective bargaining agreement came into effect which limited maximum contract length to seven years.

== International play ==
Medal record

Men's ice hockey

Representing Sweden

World Junior Championships
Silver medal – second place	2024 Sweden	

World U18 Championships
Gold medal – first place	2022 Germany	

Östlund represented Sweden at the 2022 IIHF World U18 Championships where he recorded four goals and six assists in six games and won a gold medal.

Östlund represented Sweden at the 2024 World Junior Ice Hockey Championships where he recorded three goals and seven assists in seven games and won a silver medal.

== Career statistics ==
=== Regular season and playoffs ===
			Regular season					Playoffs
Season	Team	League	GP	G	A	Pts	PIM	GP	G	A	Pts	PIM
2019–20	Djurgårdens IF	J18	15	2	7	9	10	—	—	—	—	—
2020–21	Djurgårdens IF	J20	10	7	8	15	0	—	—	—	—	—
2021–22	Djurgårdens IF	J18	1	0	2	2	0	4	2	5	7	0
2021–22	Djurgårdens IF	J20	32	9	33	42	6	5	5	2	7	4
2021–22	Djurgårdens IF	SHL	11	0	0	0	0	—	—	—	—	—
2022–23	Djurgårdens IF	Allsv	37	8	18	26	12	12	2	3	5	4
2022–23	Djurgårdens IF	J20	—	—	—	—	—	1	0	1	1	2
2023–24	Växjö Lakers	SHL	38	12	11	23	4	7	1	1	2	2
2023–24	Rochester Americans	AHL	2	0	1	1	2	3	1	0	1	0
2024–25	Rochester Americans	AHL	45	19	17	36	14	8	0	2	2	10
2024–25	Buffalo Sabres	NHL	8	0	0	0	2	—	—	—	—	—
2025–26	Rochester Americans	AHL	7	3	7	10	2	—	—	—	—	—
2025–26	Buffalo Sabres	NHL	60	11	16	27	14	3	1	1	2	2
SHL totals			49	12	11	23	4	7	1	1	2	2
NHL totals			68	11	16	27	16	3	1	1	2	2

=== International ===
Year	Team	Event	Result	GP	G	A	Pts	PIM
2021	Sweden	U18	3rd place, bronze medalist(s)	5	1	1	2	0
2021	Sweden	HG18	3rd place, bronze medalist(s)	5	0	2	2	2
2022	Sweden	U18	1st place, gold medalist(s)	6	4	6	10	6
2023	Sweden	WJC	4th	7	1	3	4	2
2024	Sweden	WJC	2nd place, silver medalist(s)	7	3	7	10	16
Junior totals				30	9	19	28	26

Awards and achievements
Preceded by Matthew Savoie	Buffalo Sabres first-round draft pick 2022	Succeeded by Jiří Kulich
