= Frölundaborg =

Arena in Gothenburg, Sweden

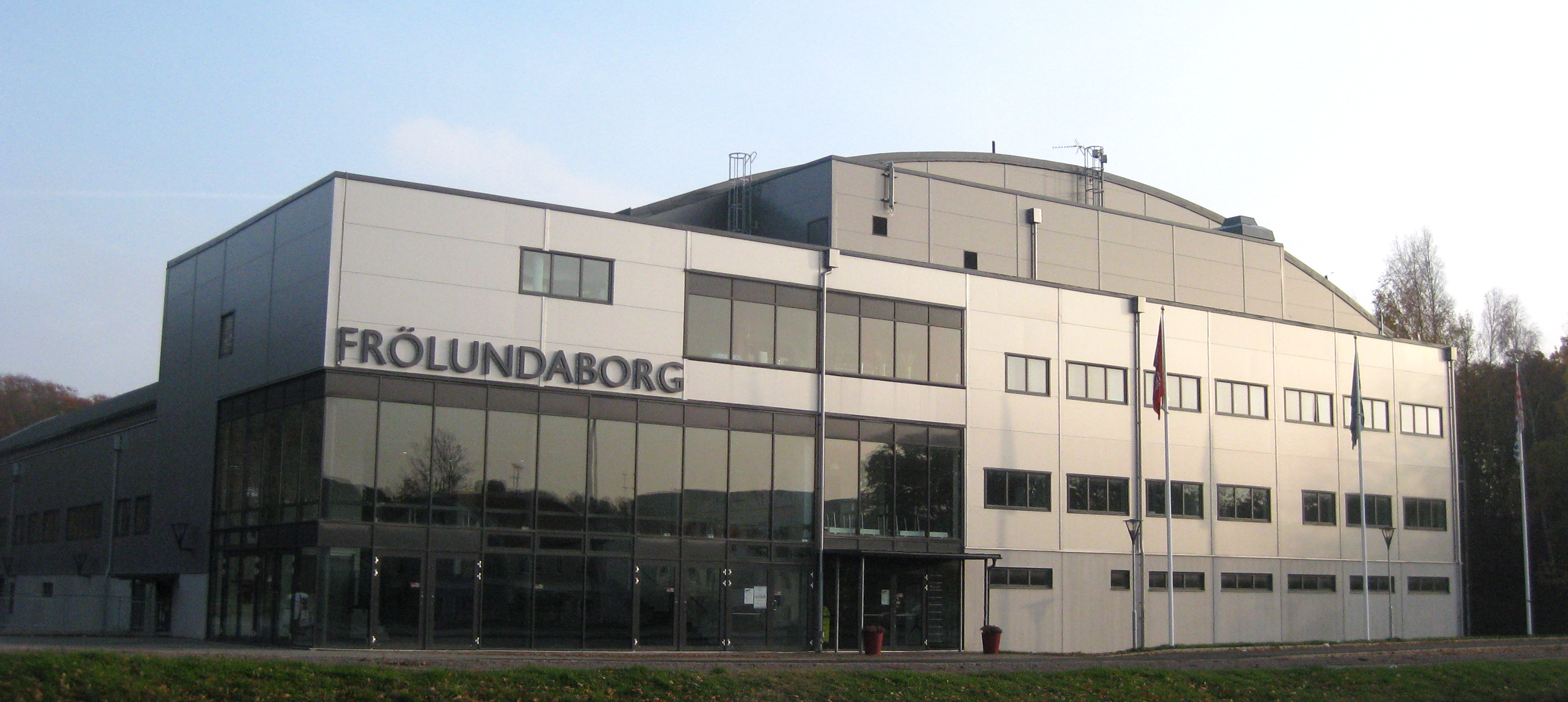
- Interactive map of Frölundaborg
- Full name: Frölundaborgs Isstadion
- Location: Mikael Ljungbergs väg 11; 414 76 Gothenburg
- Coordinates: 57°40′40.0″N 11°56′10.55″E
- Owner: Municipality of Gothenburg
- Capacity: 7,600

Construction
- Opened: 12 September 1967
- Renovated: 2007–2009

Frölundaborg is an indoor arena located in the Frölunda borough of Gothenburg, Sweden. Frölundaborg is primarily used as an indoor venue for ice hockey games. It has a capacity of 7,600 people.

The attendance record is 10,244, set in 1970. It also has been used when the main arena, Scandinavium, has been scheduled for other activities. This has been the case several times for unplanned matches, such as when Frölunda HC played in the Swedish Championship finals. It also serves as a venue for handball events.

The Frölundaborg, along with the Scandinavium, were the venues hosting the 2024 IIHF World Junior Hockey Championships in Gothenburg. It hosted games in Pool B.

== History ==
Frölundaborg cost 6.3 million SEK (Swedish Krona) to build in 1967. Since then, 4.9 million SEK has been invested in the facility, which was valued to 3.7 million SEK in the beginning of 2006. The arena changed owners in February 2006 and underwent renovations for 100 million SEK in 2007 to make it a modern arena.

In the late 1980s Frölundaborg was also used as a live music venue as a smaller and less expensive alternative to 12,000 seat arena Scandinavium hosting concerts by bands including Metallica, Kiss and Judas Priest.

== See also ==
- Assyriska BK
- Utsiktens BK
- Frölunda HC
- Västra Frölunda IF
- Näsets SK
- Älvsborgs FF
- IF Väster
- List of indoor arenas in Sweden
- List of indoor arenas in Nordic countries
