= Oiva Keskinen =

Finnish ice hockey player

- Born: 28 February 2004 (age 22) Ylöjärvi, Finland
- Height: 6 ft 0 in (183 cm)
- Weight: 181 lb (82 kg; 12 st 13 lb)
- Position: Center
- Shoots: Left
- NHL team (P) Cur. team Former teams: Columbus Blue Jackets; Cleveland Monsters (AHL); Tappara
- NHL draft: 194th overall, 2023; Columbus Blue Jackets
- Playing career: 2023–present

Oiva Keskinen (born 28 February 2004) is a Finnish professional ice hockey center who is currently playing for the Cleveland Monsters in the American Hockey League (AHL) as a prospect under contract to the Columbus Blue Jackets of the National Hockey League (NHL).

== Playing career ==
As a youth player, Keskinen played in local teams Uplakers and HC Nokia before moving to the youth team of Tappara for the 2019–2020 season. He was selected by Columbus Blue Jackets in the seventh-round, 194th overall, at the 2023 NHL entry draft. He made his Liiga debut in Tappara on 13 September 2023 in a game against Pelicans and scored on his debut. He went on to win the Finnish championship with Tappara in the 2023–24 Liiga season.

On 17 May 2025, Keskinen was signed by the Columbus Blue Jackets to a three-year, entry-level contract.

== International play ==
Keskinen represented Finland men's national junior ice hockey team in the 2024 World Junior Ice Hockey Championships. He made his debut in the Finland men's national ice hockey team and gained his first senior national team goal on 8 February 2025 in a match against Czech Republic.

== Career statistics ==
=== Regular season and playoffs ===
			Regular season					Playoffs
Season	Team	League	GP	G	A	Pts	PIM	GP	G	A	Pts	PIM
2021–22	Tappara	U20	7	1	0	1	2	—	—	—	—	—
2022–23	Tappara	U20	38	20	21	41	8	11	3	7	10	6
2023–24	Tappara	Liiga	54	7	20	27	6	16	2	7	9	4
2024–25	Tappara	Liiga	59	15	20	35	26	9	0	1	1	0
2025–26	Tappara	Liiga	49	20	17	37	14	17	3	5	8	2
Liiga totals			162	42	57	99	46	42	5	13	18	6

=== International ===
Year	Team	Event	Result	GP	G	A	Pts	PIM
2024	Finland	WJC	4th	7	2	3	5	0
Junior totals				7	2	3	5	0
