= Jani Nyman =

Finnish Ice hockey player (born 2004)

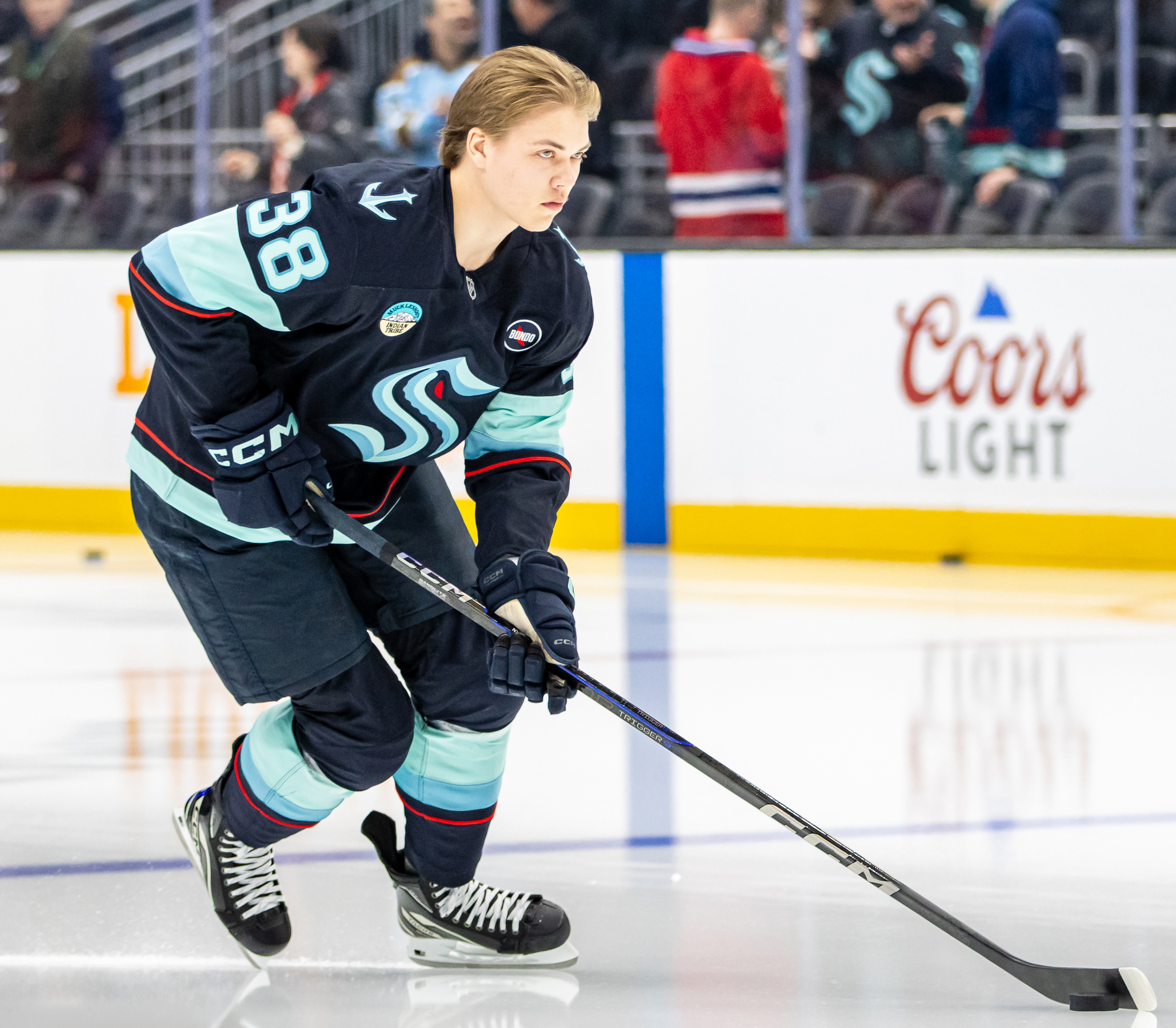
- Nyman with the Seattle Kraken in 2025
- Born: 30 July 2004 (age 22) Valkeakoski, Finland
- Height: 6 ft 2 in (188 cm)
- Weight: 212 lb (96 kg; 15 st 2 lb)
- Position: Right wing
- Shoots: Left
- NHL team Former teams: Seattle Kraken; Ilves
- NHL draft: 49th overall, 2022; Seattle Kraken
- Playing career: 2021–present

Jani Nyman (Finnish pronunciation: [ˈjɑni ˈnymɑn]; born 30 July 2004) is a Finnish professional ice hockey player who is a right winger for the Seattle Kraken of the National Hockey League (NHL). He was selected 49th overall, by the Kraken in the 2022 NHL entry draft.

== Playing career ==
Nyman played junior hockey with Tampere Ilves's SM-sarja team. In the 2018–19 season, Nyman won the C-youth Championship qualifiers with 22 goals and 46 points. In the playoffs, he was Ilves's best scorer with four goals and five points, tied with Julius Ikonen. In the 2020–21 season, with 10 goals and 23 points, he tied for second place in Ilves's goal scoring rankings with Nikolai Hakala.

On 3 May 2021, Nyman signed a 3-year SM-Liiga contract with Ilves. He played most of the 2021–22 season on loan with the team Koovee in Mestis, where Nyman played 34 regular season games with 18 goals and 35 points, which made him the team's best scorer. Nyman was chosen as Mestis's rookie of the month for the months of November and March. Nyman would make his Liiga debut with Ilves when he was only 17 years old on 16 October 2021, away against Helsinki IFK. A place in Ilves's lineup opened up for Nyman due to an injury to Balázs Sebők. He would get placed on the fourth line, with Joni Ikonen and Joonas Oden. In the game, any man would get an assist for on a goal by Matias Mäntykivi. Nyman would play ten games in the Liiga during the season.

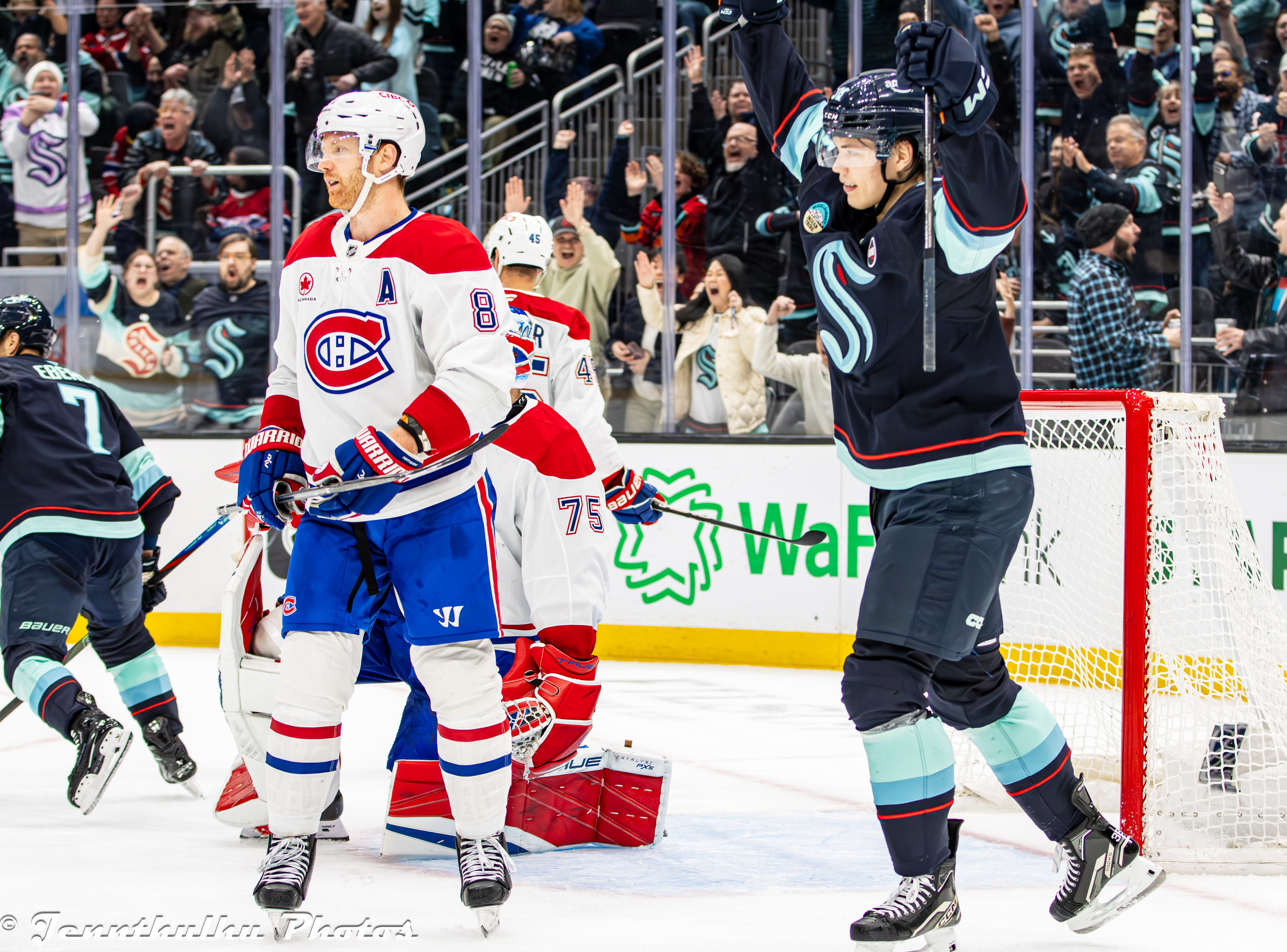
Nyman celebrating after scoring his first career NHL goal.

The Seattle Kraken would draft Nyman in the second round (49th overall) in the 2022 NHL entry draft. However, Nyman would stay with Ilves. Nyman would score the first goal of his Liiga career with Ilves during the 2022–23 season in his second game of the season on 21 September 2022, away against Porin Ässät. In total, during his rookie season, Nyman scored ten goals for 14 points in 29 regular season games and one assist in six playoff games. At the end of January 2023, he was sidelined for more than a month due to an injury. Nyman returned to the ice in March. On 25 November 2022, Ilves would sign Nyman to a one-year contract extension.

On 12 June 2023, Nyman signed a three-year, entry-level contract with the Seattle Kraken of the National Hockey League (NHL). In July, the Kraken announced that they would loan him to Ilves for the 2023–24 season. Nyman scored the first hat trick of his league career on 18 November 2023, against SaiPa.

On 9 April 2024, the Kraken would assign Nyman to their American Hockey League (AHL) affiliate, the Coachella Valley Firebirds. He would make his debut with the Firebirds on 12 April. His first AHL goal would come on 14 April, the game-winning-goal of a 2–1 victory over the San Diego Gulls.

The Kraken called Nyman up from the AHL on 10 March 2025. Nyman made his NHL debut on 12 March 2025, scoring his first NHL goal against Jakub Dobeš of the Montreal Canadiens, as the Kraken won, 5–4, in overtime. Nyman was named the first star of the game.

== International play ==
Medal record

Representing Finland

Ice hockey

World U18 Championship
Bronze medal – third place	2022 Germany	

Nyman played in the 2023 World Junior Ice Hockey Championships, representing Finland. He also played in the 2022 IIHF World U18 Championships, where Nyman would win bronze.

== Playing style ==
Nyman has stated that he followed Dallas Stars player Mikko Rantanen, to whom he has been compared. Nyman has also been compared to Montreal Canadiens player Patrik Laine, especially with his shot.

== Personal life ==
Nyman's older brothers, Niko and Toni, were also ice hockey players.

Nyman also played football with FC Haka as a child.

== Career statistics ==
=== Regular season and playoffs ===
			Regular season					Playoffs
Season	Team	League	GP	G	A	Pts	PIM	GP	G	A	Pts	PIM
2019–20	Ilves	Jr. A	1	0	0	0	0	—	—	—	—	—
2020–21	Ilves	Jr. A	36	10	13	23	8	—	—	—	—	—
2021–22	Ilves	Jr. A	3	2	2	4	0	—	—	—	—	—
2021–22	Ilves	Liiga	10	0	1	1	0	—	—	—	—	—
2021–22	Koovee	Mestis	34	18	17	35	20	—	—	—	—	—
2022–23	Ilves	Jr. A	2	5	1	6	2	—	—	—	—	—
2022–23	Ilves	Liiga	29	10	4	14	6	6	0	1	1	4
2023–24	Ilves	Liiga	48	26	17	43	2	5	1	1	2	0
2023–24	Coachella Valley Firebirds	AHL	5	2	0	2	2	9	1	0	1	4
2024–25	Coachella Valley Firebirds	AHL	58	28	16	44	31	6	0	1	1	8
2024–25	Seattle Kraken	NHL	12	3	3	6	4	—	—	—	—	—
2025–26	Coachella Valley Firebirds	AHL	39	21	12	33	33	12	3	6	9	14
2025–26	Seattle Kraken	NHL	28	4	3	7	6	—	—	—	—	—
Liiga totals			87	36	22	58	8	11	1	2	3	4
NHL totals			40	7	6	13	10	—	—	—	—	—

=== International ===
Year	Team	Event	Result	GP	G	A	Pts	PIM
2021	Finland	HG18	4th	5	3	4	7	2
2022	Finland	U18	3rd place, bronze medalist(s)	6	2	2	4	2
2023	Finland	WJC	5th	5	2	1	3	0
2024	Finland	WJC	4th	7	2	4	6	2
Junior totals				23	9	11	20	6
