= Matt Poitras =

Canadian ice hockey player (born 2004)

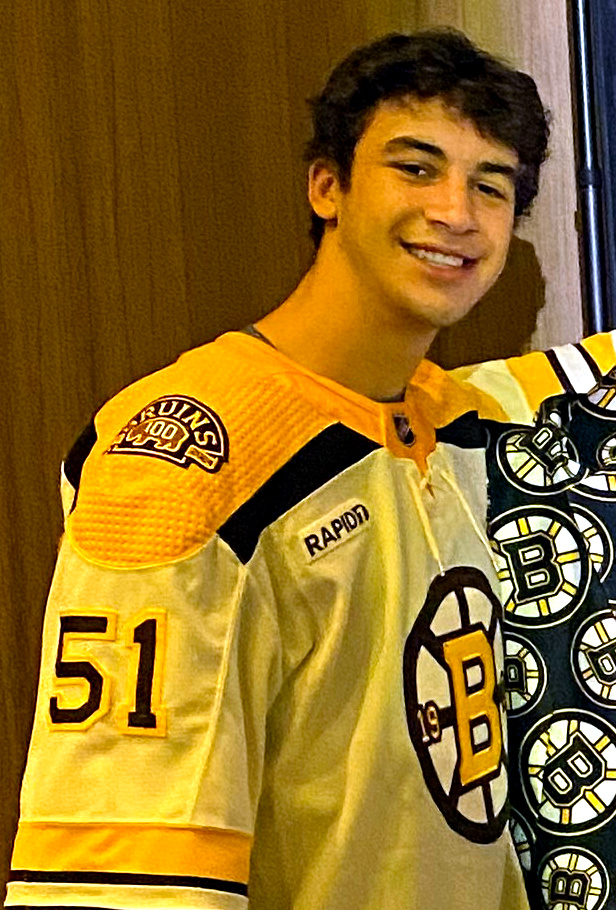
- Poitras with the Boston Bruins in 2023
- Born: March 10, 2004 (age 22) Ajax, Ontario, Canada
- Height: 6 ft 0 in (183 cm)
- Weight: 189 lb (86 kg; 13 st 7 lb)
- Position: Centre
- Shoots: Right
- NHL team: Boston Bruins
- NHL draft: 54th overall, 2022; Boston Bruins
- Playing career: 2023–present

Matthew Poitras (/ˈpɒtjrɑː/; born March 10, 2004) is a Canadian professional ice hockey centre for the Boston Bruins of the National Hockey League (NHL).

== Early life ==
Poitras was born March 10, 2004, in Whitby, Ontario. The middle child of financial adviser Phil and project manager Tricia, he began ice skating at the age of two, and started playing ice hockey when he was four. During the 2019–20 season, Poitras served as captain of the Whitby Wildcats minor ice hockey team. He recorded 26 goals and 68 points in 36 games that season for the Wildcats.

== Playing career ==
=== Amateur ===
Poitras was drafted by the Guelph Storm 12th overall in the 2020 OHL Priority Selection. However, his first season with the team was cancelled due to the COVID-19 pandemic.

In the 2022–23 season, Poitras ended the regular season tied for 5th most total points in the league, with 95. He was named OHL Player of the Week on November 21, 2022.

Poitras was drafted 54th overall in the second round of the 2022 NHL entry draft by the Boston Bruins.

=== Professional ===
==== Boston Bruins ====
On April 14, 2023, the Providence Bruins announced that they had signed Poitras to an amateur tryout contract for the remainder of the 2022–23 season. However, Poitras did not appear in any games with the club for the remainder of the season, regular season or playoffs. On May 5, 2023, the Boston Bruins announced that they had signed Poitras to a three-year, entry-level contract.

Poitras impressed in his first preseason with the Bruins, and as a result, earned a spot on the NHL roster as a 19-year old. Poitras earned his first NHL point in his first NHL game, an assist on a goal by Trent Frederic. Poitras scored his first and second NHL goals on October 22, 2023, in a 3–1 win against the Anaheim Ducks. On October 31, the Bruins announced that Poitras was staying on the NHL roster rather than sending him back to the OHL, therefore burning a year of his entry-level contract. On December 18, 2023, the Bruins announced that they had loaned Poitras to Team Canada for the 2024 World Junior Ice Hockey Championships. Poitras registered two goals and two assists in five games in the tournament, as Canada finished 5th in the standings. Poitras returned to the NHL club on January 6, 2024. On January 9, 2024, just three games after returning to the NHL lineup, Poitras exited a game late against the Arizona Coyotes with a shoulder injury. Poitras would return to game action on January 20, but would only play three more games before the Bruins announced on February 7 that Poitras had undergone shoulder surgery and would miss the rest of the season. Poitras ended his rookie season with five goals and 15 total points in 33 games.

Coming off of injury, Poitras once again made the NHL opening night roster to start the 2024–25 season, however, a lingering injury caused him to be scratched for the Bruins opening night game. After playing in 14 of the Bruins first 16 games, Poitras was demoted to the Providence Bruins on November 11, 2024, marking the first time in his professional career that he would be playing in the American Hockey League (AHL). Poitras enjoyed a successful first stint with Providence, scoring eight goals and 12 assists in 23 games between November 15, 2024, and January 11, 2025. This included a streak in early December where he scored a goal in seven straight games. This success, as well as injures to the NHL Bruins lineup, rewarded Poitras with a call-up to the NHL squad on January 14, 2025. Poitras would return to the NHL with immediate impact, scoring an assist in his first game back. However, Poitras would struggle to produce afterwards, and was sent back to Providence on March 10, 2025, without having scored a goal in his stint with the NHL club. Poitras remained with Providence for the rest of the season, with the Bruins organization opting to have Poitras help the P-Bruins in a playoff push rather than call him up to a struggling Bruins squad. Poitras continued his offensive output in the AHL, and finished the season tied for second on the team in goals, with 17. In a decisive Game 3 against the Springfield Thunderbirds in the opening round of the 2025 Calder Cup playoffs, Poitras would score two goals to help the Bruins clinch the series. Unfortunately, the Bruins would lose the next series in five games to the Charlotte Checkers, ending their season.

Poitras was assigned to Providence to start the 2025–26 season. Poitras was again able to have scoring success in Providence, leading to a call-up to the NHL club in late January due to injuries. Poitras played three games with Boston, including the 2026 NHL Stadium Series where he scored a goal, before being sent back down to the AHL. Poitras would spend the rest of the season in Providence, scoring 13 goals and 31 assists for 44 points, tied for fourth on the team. Poitras and the Bruins headed into the Calder Cup playoffs as the top seed in the league, facing the Springfield Thunderbirds in the first round. The Bruins would get upset by the Thunderbirds and lose in four games, with Poitras scoring a goal and three assists in those games.

On September 16, 2026, Poitras signed a one-year, two-way deal worth $850,000 to remain with the Bruins.

Poitras was put on the injured reserve (IR) to start the 2026–27 season after suffering an injury in practice.

== Personal ==
Poitras is the second of three children born to Phil and Tricia Poitras. His older brother, Adam, is a lacrosse player for the Maryland Whipsnakes of the Premier Lacrosse League, and was selected second overall by the Las Vegas Desert Dogs in the 2023 National Lacrosse League Entry Draft. His younger sister, Abby, currently plays hockey at Mercyhurst.

== Career statistics ==
=== Regular season and playoffs ===
| | | | Regular season | | | | | Playoffs |
| Season | Team | League | GP | G | A | Pts | PIM | GP | G | A | Pts | PIM |
|---|---|---|---|---|---|---|---|---|---|---|---|---|
| 2019–20 | Whitby Wildcats U18 AAA | ETAHL | — | — | — | — | — | 1 | 0 | 0 | 0 | 2 |
| 2021–22 | Guelph Storm | OHL | 68 | 21 | 29 | 50 | 58 | 5 | 1 | 3 | 4 | 6 |
| 2022–23 | Guelph Storm | OHL | 63 | 16 | 79 | 95 | 40 | 6 | 2 | 4 | 6 | 4 |
| 2023–24 | Boston Bruins | NHL | 33 | 5 | 10 | 15 | 6 | — | — | — | — | — |
| 2024–25 | Providence Bruins | AHL | 40 | 17 | 24 | 41 | 36 | 8 | 2 | 2 | 4 | 6 |
| 2024–25 | Boston Bruins | NHL | 33 | 1 | 10 | 11 | 8 | — | — | — | — | — |
| 2025–26 | Providence Bruins | AHL | 69 | 13 | 31 | 44 | 48 | 4 | 1 | 3 | 4 | 6 |
| 2025–26 | Boston Bruins | NHL | 3 | 1 | 0 | 1 | 4 | — | — | — | — | — |
| NHL totals | | | 69 | 7 | 20 | 27 | 18 | — | — | — | — | — |

=== International ===
| Year | Team | Event | Result | GP | G | A | Pts | PIM |
|---|---|---|---|---|---|---|---|---|
| 2024 | Canada | WJC | 5th | 5 | 2 | 2 | 4 | 4 |
| Junior totals | | | | 5 | 2 | 2 | 4 | 4 |
