= Liam Öhgren =

Swedish ice hockey player (born 2004)

- Born: 28 January 2004 (age 22) Stockholm, Sweden
- Height: 6 ft 0 in (183 cm)
- Weight: 187 lb (85 kg; 13 st 5 lb)
- Position: Left wing
- Shoots: Left
- NHL team Former teams: Vancouver Canucks; Djurgårdens IF; Färjestad BK; Minnesota Wild
- NHL draft: 19th overall, 2022; Minnesota Wild
- Playing career: 2021–present

Liam Öhgren (born 28 January 2004) is a Swedish professional ice hockey player who is a left winger for the Vancouver Canucks of the National Hockey League (NHL). He was drafted 19th overall by the Minnesota Wild in the 2022 NHL entry draft.

== Playing career ==
During the 2021–22 season Öhgren split time between Djurgårdens IF's J20 team and SHL teams. He recorded 33 goals and 25 assists in 30 games in the J20 league, and recorded one goal and one assist in 25 games for the SHL team.

Following his selection in the 2022 NHL entry draft, Öhgren was signed to a three-year, entry-level contract with the Minnesota Wild on 17 July 2022.

With Djurgårdens IF relegated to the HockeyAllsvenskan in the 2022–23 season, Öhgren continued his development in the second tier league by posting 11 goals and 20 points through 36 regular season games. He recorded eight goals and 13 points in 17 playoff games, however was unable to help Djurgårdens IF return to the SHL in losing in the Allsvenskan finals to Modo Hockey.

In order to continue his development in the SHL, Öhgren agreed to join Färjestad BK on loan from the Minnesota Wild on 10 May 2023.

On 10 April 2024, he was recalled by Minnesota and made his NHL debut on 12 April, in a game against the Vegas Golden Knights. On 12 December 2025, Öhgren was traded to the Vancouver Canucks, along with Marco Rossi, Zeev Buium, and a 2026 first-round pick, in exchange for Quinn Hughes. Prior to being traded, he was held pointless through 18 games with the Wild but recorded three goals and four assists in 46 games over the past three seasons.

== International play ==
Medal record

Men's ice hockey

Representing Sweden

World Junior Championships
Silver medal – second place	2024 Sweden	
Bronze medal – third place	2022 Canada	

World U18 Championships
Gold medal – first place	2022 Germany	

Öhgren represented Sweden under-18 team at the 2022 World U18 Championships where he served as team captain and recorded three goals and six assists in six games and won a gold medal.

== Career statistics ==
=== Regular season and playoffs ===
			Regular season					Playoffs
Season	Team	League	GP	G	A	Pts	PIM	GP	G	A	Pts	PIM
2019–20	Djurgårdens IF	J18	21	9	6	15	4	—	—	—	—	—
2020–21	Djurgårdens IF	J20	8	4	2	6	0	—	—	—	—	—
2021–22	Djurgårdens IF	J18	—	—	—	—	—	4	5	4	9	2
2021–22	Djurgårdens IF	J20	30	33	25	58	6	6	2	4	6	4
2021–22	Djurgårdens IF	SHL	25	1	1	2	6	—	—	—	—	—
2022–23	Djurgårdens IF	Allsv	36	11	9	20	2	17	8	5	13	4
2023–24	Färjestad BK	SHL	26	12	7	19	12	4	0	0	0	0
2023–24	Iowa Wild	AHL	3	0	0	0	0	—	—	—	—	—
2023–24	Minnesota Wild	NHL	4	1	1	2	0	—	—	—	—	—
2024–25	Minnesota Wild	NHL	24	2	3	5	2	—	—	—	—	—
2024–25	Iowa Wild	AHL	41	19	18	37	10	—	—	—	—	—
2025–26	Minnesota Wild	NHL	18	0	0	0	0	—	—	—	—	—
2025–26	Iowa Wild	AHL	9	3	2	5	0	—	—	—	—	—
2025–26	Vancouver Canucks	NHL	51	8	10	18	2	—	—	—	—	—
SHL totals			51	13	8	21	18	4	0	0	0	0
NHL totals			97	11	14	25	4	—	—	—	—	—

=== International ===
Year	Team	Event	Result	GP	G	A	Pts	PIM
2021	Sweden	HG18	3rd place, bronze medalist(s)	5	4	3	7	0
2022	Sweden	U18	1st place, gold medalist(s)	6	3	6	9	2
2022	Sweden	WJC	3rd place, bronze medalist(s)	7	0	1	1	2
2023	Sweden	WJC	4th	7	2	0	2	0
2024	Sweden	WJC	2nd place, silver medalist(s)	7	0	2	2	4
Junior totals				32	9	12	21	8

Awards and achievements
Preceded by Carson Lambos	Minnesota Wild first-round draft pick 2022	Succeeded by Danila Yurov
