= Tom Willander =

Swedish ice hockey player (born 2005)

- Born: 9 February 2005 (age 21) Stockholm, Sweden
- Height: 6 ft 1 in (185 cm)
- Weight: 179 lb (81 kg; 12 st 11 lb)
- Position: Defence
- Shoots: Right
- NHL team Former teams: Vancouver Canucks; Rögle BK
- NHL draft: 11th overall, 2023; Vancouver Canucks
- Playing career: 2023–present

Tom Willander (born 9 February 2005) is a Swedish professional ice hockey player who is a defenceman for the Vancouver Canucks of the National Hockey League (NHL). Willander was drafted 11th overall by the Canucks in the 2023 NHL entry draft. Prior to joining Boston University, Willander played for Rögle BK in the Swedish Hockey League (SHL).

== Playing career ==
Willander committed to playing for Boston University in the NCAA in his post-draft year, citing playing in college as better for his development over playing in the SHL. Willander scored the game-winning goal against Team Canada during the grouping stage of the 2024 World Junior Ice Hockey Championships, ensuring the highest seed for Team Sweden.

On 15 May 2025, Willander signalled the conclusion of his collegiate career following his sophomore season by signing a three-year, entry-level contract with the Vancouver Canucks.

Willander played his first NHL game against the New York Rangers on October 28, 2025. On December 6, 2025, Willander scored his first NHL goal against the Minnesota Wild, tying the game at 1–1. The Vancouver Canucks ultimately won the game 4–2.

== International play ==
Medal record

Representing Sweden

Ice hockey

World Junior Championships
Silver medal – second place	2024 Sweden	

World U18 Championships
Silver medal – second place	2023 Switzerland	

Willander represented Sweden at the 2024 World Junior Ice Hockey Championships and won a silver medal.

== Career statistics ==
=== Regular season and playoffs ===
			Regular season					Playoffs
Season	Team	League	GP	G	A	Pts	PIM	GP	G	A	Pts	PIM
2021–22	AIK	J20	12	0	0	0	4	1	0	0	0	0
2021–22	AIK	Allsv	1	0	0	0	0	—	—	—	—	—
2022–23	Rögle BK	J20	39	4	21	25	22	6	1	3	4	0
2022–23	Rögle BK	SHL	2	0	0	0	0	—	—	—	—	—
2023–24	Boston University	HE	38	4	21	25	10	—	—	—	—	—
2024–25	Boston University	HE	39	2	22	24	8	—	—	—	—	—
2025–26	Abbotsford Canucks	AHL	5	1	1	2	0	—	—	—	—	—
2025–26	Vancouver Canucks	NHL	70	5	16	21	28	—	—	—	—	—
SHL totals			2	0	0	0	0	—	—	—	—	—
NHL totals			70	5	16	21	28	—	—	—	—	—

=== International ===
Year	Team	Event	Result	GP	G	A	Pts	PIM
2022	Sweden	HG18	2nd place, silver medalist(s)	5	0	2	2	4
2023	Sweden	U18	2nd place, silver medalist(s)	7	3	5	8	27
2024	Sweden	WJC	2nd place, silver medalist(s)	7	1	2	3	2
2025	Sweden	WJC	4th	7	2	3	5	8
Junior totals				26	6	12	18	41

== Awards and honors ==
Award	Year
College
All-Hockey East Second Team	2024, 2025

Awards and achievements
Preceded by Jonathan Lekkerimäki	Vancouver Canucks first-round draft pick 2023	Succeeded by Braeden Cootes
