= Gabriel Koch (ice hockey) =

Norwegian ice hockey player (borh 2004)

- Born: 8 January 2004 (age 22) Norway
- Height: 5 ft 11 in (180 cm)
- Weight: 163 lb (74 kg; 11 st 9 lb)
- Position: Defenceman
- Shoots: Left
- SHL team Former teams: Malmö Redhawks; Vålerenga
- Playing career: 2021–present

Gabriel Koch is a Norwegian ice hockey defenceman who plays for the Malmö Redhawks of the SHL. He spent his junior years in the Vålerenga organization, where he also made his first team debut.

== Career statistics ==
			Regular season					Playoffs
Season	Team	League	GP	G	A	Pts	PIM	GP	G	A	Pts	PIM
2019-20	Vålerenga	NOR U21	8	0	1	1	2	—	—	—	—	—
2020-21	Vålerenga	NOR U21	7	1	1	2	0	—	—	—	—	—
2021-22	Vålerenga	NOR U20	6	1	3	4	2	2	0	0	0	0
2021-22	Vålerenga	NOR	30	0	4	4	4	6	0	1	1	0
SHL totals			0	0	0	0	0	0	0	0	0	0
