= 2021 Hlinka Gretzky Cup =

U18 international ice hockey tournament

Tournament details
- Host countries: Slovakia; Czech Republic
- Venues: 2 (in 2 host cities)
- Dates: 2–7 August
- Teams: 8

Final positions
- Champions: Russia (5th title)
- Runners-up: Slovakia
- Third place: Sweden
- Fourth place: Finland

Tournament statistics
- Games played: 18
- Goals scored: 152 (8.44 per game)
- Scoring leader: (Russia) Matvei Michkov (13 points)

Official website
- hlinkagretzky.cz

The 2021 Hlinka Gretzky Cup was an under-18 international ice hockey tournament that was held in Piešťany, Slovakia and Břeclav, Czech Republic from 2 to 7 August 2021 at FOSFA Aréna in Břeclav and Easton Arena in Piešťany.

== Preliminary round ==
All times are local (UTC+2).

=== Group A ===
| Pos | Team | Pld | W | OTW | OTL | L | GF | GA | GD | Pts | Qualification |
|---|---|---|---|---|---|---|---|---|---|---|---|
| 1 | Russia | 3 | 3 | 0 | 0 | 0 | 21 | 7 | +14 | 9 | Semifinals |
| 2 | Finland | 3 | 1 | 1 | 0 | 1 | 14 | 9 | +5 | 5 | Semifinals |
| 3 | Czech Republic (H) | 3 | 1 | 0 | 1 | 1 | 9 | 11 | −2 | 4 | Fifth place game |
| 4 | Switzerland | 3 | 0 | 0 | 0 | 3 | 3 | 20 | −17 | 0 | Seventh place game |

Source: hockeyslovakia.sk
(H) Host

| 2 August 2021; 15:30 | Finland | 2–5 (1–1, 1–1, 0–3) | Russia | FOSFA Aréna, Břeclav |

czsk

| 2 August 2021; 19:00 | Czech Republic | 3–0 (2–0, 1–0, 0–0) | Switzerland | FOSFA Aréna, Břeclav |

czsk

| 3 August 2021; 15:30 | Switzerland | 2–9 (0–0, 0–6, 2–3) | Russia | FOSFA Aréna, Břeclav |

czsk

| 3 August 2021; 19:00 | Czech Republic | 3–4 GWS (0–0, 1–1, 2–2); OT: (0–0); SO: (0–1) | Finland | FOSFA Aréna, Břeclav |

czsk

| 4 August 2021; 15:30 | Finland | 8–1 (5–0, 1–1, 2–0) | Switzerland | FOSFA Aréna, Břeclav |

czsk

| 4 August 2021; 19:00 | Czech Republic | 3–7 (1–0, 1–5, 1–2) | Russia | FOSFA Aréna, Břeclav |

czsk

=== Group B ===
| Pos | Team | Pld | W | OTW | OTL | L | GF | GA | GD | Pts | Qualification |
|---|---|---|---|---|---|---|---|---|---|---|---|
| 1 | Slovakia (H) | 3 | 3 | 0 | 0 | 0 | 21 | 7 | +14 | 9 | Semifinals |
| 2 | Sweden | 3 | 2 | 0 | 0 | 1 | 13 | 10 | +3 | 6 | Semifinals |
| 3 | United States | 3 | 1 | 0 | 0 | 2 | 15 | 10 | +5 | 3 | Fifth place game |
| 4 | Germany | 3 | 0 | 0 | 0 | 3 | 5 | 27 | −22 | 0 | Seventh place game |

Source: hockeyslovakia.sk
(H) Host

| 2 August 2021; 15:30 | Germany | 3–5 (0–2, 3–0, 0–3) | Sweden | Easton Arena, Piešťany |

czsk

| 2 August 2021; 19:00 | Slovakia | 5–2 (3–0, 1–2, 1–0) | United States | Easton Arena, Piešťany; Attendance: 500 |

czsk

Rastislav Eliaš
Goalies
Lucas Szyszka

| Repčík (Slafkovský, Mešár) (PP) – 00:41 | 1–0 |
| Dvorský (Čiernik, Molnár) – 01:46 | 2–0 |
| Slafkovský (Moško, Repčík) – 03:12 | 3–0 |
| Dvorský (Nemec, Repčík) (PP) – 21:10 | 4–0 |
| | 4–1 | 25:45 – Plante (Borgesi) |
| | 4–2 | 34:56 – Aegerter (Finley) |
| Dvorský (Repčík, Mešár) (PP) – 43:37 | 5–2 |

4 min
Penalties
10 min
28
Shots
34

| 3 August 2021; 15:30 | Sweden | 5–3 (1–3, 2–0, 2–0) | United States | Easton Arena, Piešťany |

czsk

| 3 August 2021; 19:00 | Slovakia | 12–2 (5–1, 4–0, 3–1) | Germany | Easton Arena, Piešťany; Attendance: 500 |

czsk

Rastislav Eliaš
Goalies

| | 0–1 | 02:44 – Gaidel (Ullmann) |
| Dvorský (Čiernik, Molnár) – 04:48 | 1–1 |
| Mešár (Nemec, Slafkovský) (PP) – 08:11 | 2–1 |
| Repčík (Slafkovský, Mešár) (PP) – 13:16 | 3–1 |
| Slafkovský (Nemec, Dvorský) (PP) – 14:30 | 4–1 |
| Čiernik (Petrovský, Štrbák) – 17:57 | 5–1 |
| Dvorský (Čiernik, Molnár) – 29:50 | 6–1 |
| Sýkora (Petrovský, Moško) – 32:09 | 7–1 |
| Molnár (Čiernik, Dvorský) – 34:46 | 8–1 |
| Slafkovský (Nemec, Dvorský) (PP) – 37:16 | 9–1 |
| Molnár (Dvorský, Čiernik) – 51:17 | 10–1 |
| Dvorský (Mešár, Nemec) (PP) – 52:20 | 11–1 |
| | 11–2 | 53:47 – Pischoff (Elias, Hauf) |
| Repčík (Mešár, Kmec) (PP) – 56:16 | 12–2 |

8 min
Penalties
16 min
38
Shots
16

| 4 August 2021; 15:30 | United States | 10–0 (2–0, 3–0, 5–0) | Germany | Easton Arena, Piešťany |

czsk

| 4 August 2021; 19:00 | Slovakia | 4–3 (0–1, 2–1, 2–1) | Sweden | Easton Arena, Piešťany; Attendance: 500 |

czsk
| Rastislav Eliaš | Goalies | Hugo Hävelid |
| 8 min | Penalties | 8 min |
| 33 | Shots | 34 |

== Final round ==
=== Bracket ===
Semifinals
6 August – Břeclav
A1 Russia | 7
B2 Sweden | 5
6 August – Piešťany
B1 Slovakia | 6
A2 Finland | 2

Final
7 August – Piešťany
W1 Russia | 7
W2 Slovakia | 2
Third place
7 August – Břeclav
L1 Sweden | 4
L2 Finland | 3

=== Seventh place game ===
| 6 August 2021; 15:30 | Switzerland | 2–3 GWS (0–0, 2–2, 0–0); OT: (0–0); SO: (0–1) | Germany | Easton Arena, Piešťany |

czsk

=== Fifth place game ===
| 6 August 2021; 15:30 | Czech Republic | 4–6 (1–1, 1–2, 2–3) | United States | FOSFA Aréna, Břeclav |

czsk

=== Semifinals ===
| 6 August 2021; 19:00 | Slovakia | 6–2 (1–0, 4–0, 1–2) | Finland | Easton Arena, Piešťany; Attendance: 500 |

czsk

Rastislav Eliaš
Goalies
Niklas Kokko
Manu Lukkarinen

| Petrovský (Nátny) (SH) – 13:27 | 1–0 |
| Repčík (Moško, Slafkovský) – 26:19 | 2–0 |
| Sýkora (Petrovský, Nátny) – 27:01 | 3–0 |
| Suchý (Šotek) (SH) – 38:41 | 4–0 |
| Šotek (Suchý) (SH) – 39:42 | 5–0 |
| Dvorský (Repčík, Slafkovský) (PP) – 54:40 | 6–0 |
| | 6–1 | 55:18 – Hokkanen (Raiman) |
| | 6–2 | 57:12 – Kemell (Lassila, Kulonummi) (PP2) |

16 min
Penalties
16 min
47
Shots
27

| 6 August 2021; 19:00 | Russia | 7–5 (1–2, 3–2, 3–1) | Sweden | FOSFA Aréna, Břeclav; Attendance: 422 |

czsk

Sergei Ivanov
Goalies
Hugo Hävelid

| | 0–1 | 08:40 – Lekkerimäki (Wagner |
| | 0–2 | 11:55 – Lekkerimäki |
| Larkin – 14:18 | 1–2 |
| Perevalov (Grigoryev, Gazizov) – 21:27 | 2–2 |
| | 2–3 | 21:37 – Lekkerimäki (Östlund, Hävelid) |
| | 2–4 | 23:17 – Öhgren (Hemström) (PP) |
| Michkov (Perevalov) – 25:35 | 3–4 |
| Grigoryev (Gazizov, Perevalov) (PP) – 37:16 | 4–4 |
| Rogovsky (But) – 44:40 | 5–4 |
| Demidov (Sinyatkin, Trikozov) – 45:09 | 6–4 |
| | 6–5 | 54:36 – Bystedt (Hemström, Hävelid) |
| Gazizov (EN) – 59:15 | 7–5 |

6 min
Penalties
8 min
48
Shots
26

=== Bronze medal game ===
| 7 August 2021; 17:00 | Sweden | 4–3 (1–1, 1–2, 2–0) | Finland | FOSFA Aréna, Břeclav; Attendance: 170 |

czsk

Gustaf Albihn
Goalies
Niklas Kokko

| | 0–1 | 04:54 – Heinonen (Nyman) |
| Almgren (Öhgren) – 15:52 | 1–1 |
| | 1–2 | 23:15 – Männistö (Raiman, Kulonummi) |
| Bystedt (Hävelid, Öhgren) (PP) – 37:37 | 2–2 |
| | 2–3 | 39:10 – Kemell (Lassila, Kulonummi) (PP) |
| Almgren (PP) – 54:13 | 3–3 |
| Wagner (Rudslätt, Salamonsson) – 59:32 | 4–3 |

6 min
Penalties
8 min
29
Shots
41

=== Final ===
| 7 August 2021; 17:00 | Russia | 7–2 (3–0, 2–1, 2–1) | Slovakia | Easton Arena, Piešťany; Attendance: 500 |

czsk

Sergei Ivanov
Goalies
Rastislav Eliaš
Patrik Jurčák
Referees:
(Slovakia) Daniel Konc
(Slovakia) Peter Stano
Linesmen:
(Slovakia) Lukáš Kacej
(Slovakia) Oto Durmis

| Miroshnichenko (Kvochko, Michkov) (PP) – 12:20 | 1–0 |
| Malyavin (Larkin, Remezovsky) – 13:30 | 2–0 |
| Sinyatkin (Demidov, Trikozov) – 18:09 | 3–0 |
| | 3–1 | 27:44 – Mešár (Slafkovský) |
| Miroshnichenko (Gazizov, Rogovskii) – 29:09 | 4–1 |
| Gulyaev (Michkov) – 30:17 | 5–1 |
| | 5–2 | 40:25 – Žlnka (Petrovský) |
| Rogovskii (Gazizov) – 42:35 | 6–2 |
| Michkov – 55:48 | 7–2 |

12 min
Penalties
34 min
25
Shots
41

== Final ranking ==
| Pos | Grp | Team | Pld | W | OTW | OTL | L | GF | GA | GD | Pts |
|---|---|---|---|---|---|---|---|---|---|---|---|
| 1 | A | Russia | 5 | 5 | 0 | 0 | 0 | 35 | 14 | +21 | 15 |
| 2 | B | Slovakia (H) | 5 | 4 | 0 | 0 | 1 | 29 | 16 | +13 | 12 |
| 3 | B | Sweden | 5 | 3 | 0 | 0 | 2 | 22 | 20 | +2 | 9 |
| 4 | A | Finland | 5 | 1 | 1 | 0 | 3 | 19 | 19 | 0 | 5 |
| 5 | B | United States | 4 | 2 | 0 | 0 | 2 | 21 | 14 | +7 | 6 |
| 6 | A | Czech Republic (H) | 4 | 1 | 0 | 1 | 2 | 13 | 17 | −4 | 4 |
| 7 | B | Germany | 4 | 0 | 1 | 0 | 3 | 8 | 29 | −21 | 2 |
| 8 | A | Switzerland | 4 | 0 | 0 | 1 | 3 | 5 | 23 | −18 | 1 |

(H) Host

== Statistics ==
=== Scoring leaders ===
| Pos | Player | Country | GP | G | A | Pts | +/− | PIM |
|---|---|---|---|---|---|---|---|---|
| 1 | Matvei Michkov | Russia | 5 | 8 | 5 | 13 | +12 | 2 |
| 2 | Dalibor Dvorský | Slovakia | 5 | 8 | 4 | 12 | +3 | 2 |
| 3 | Ruslan Gazizov | Russia | 5 | 3 | 7 | 10 | +8 | 4 |
| 4 | Ivan Miroshnichenko | Russia | 5 | 4 | 5 | 9 | +7 | 0 |
| 5 | Juraj Slafkovský | Slovakia | 5 | 3 | 6 | 9 | −1 | 8 |
| 6 | Mattias Hävelid | Sweden | 5 | 2 | 7 | 9 | +4 | 4 |
| 7 | Peter Repčík | Slovakia | 5 | 4 | 4 | 8 | +1 | 4 |
| 8 | Filip Mešár | Slovakia | 5 | 2 | 6 | 8 | −2 | 0 |
| 9 | Liam Öhgren | Sweden | 5 | 4 | 3 | 7 | +5 | 0 |
| 10 | Filip Bystedt | Sweden | 5 | 3 | 4 | 7 | +6 | 4 |

GP = Games played; G = Goals; A = Assists; Pts = Points; +/− = Plus–minus; PIM = Penalties In Minutes
Source: hockeyslovakia.sk

=== Goaltending leaders ===
(minimum 40% team's total ice time)

| Pos | Player | Country | TOI | GA | GAA | SA | Sv% | SO |
|---|---|---|---|---|---|---|---|---|
| 1 | Sergei Ivanov | Russia | 240:00 | 12 | 3.00 | 135 | 91.11 | 0 |
| 2 | Hugo Hävelid | Sweden | 176:13 | 13 | 4.43 | 124 | 89.52 | 0 |
| 3 | Niklas Kokko | Finland | 218:54 | 15 | 4.11 | 138 | 89.13 | 0 |
| 4 | Rastislav Eliaš | Slovakia | 270:17 | 14 | 3.11 | 128 | 89.06 | 0 |
| 5 | Jan Špunar | Czech Republic | 165:00 | 9 | 3.27 | 80 | 88.75 | 1 |

TOI = Time on ice (minutes:seconds); GA = Goals against; GAA = Goals against average; SA = Shots against; Sv% = Save percentage; SO = Shutouts
Source: hockeyslovakia.sk
