= 2023–24 WHL season =

- League: Western Hockey League
- Sport: Ice hockey
- Duration: Regular season September 22, 2023 – March 24, 2024; Playoffs March 28, 2024 – May 15, 2024
- Teams: 22
- TV partner(s): KRCW-TV, KZJO, CBC, TSN, RDS

Regular season
- Scotty Munro Memorial Trophy: Saskatoon Blades (5)
- Season MVP: Jagger Firkus (Moose Jaw Warriors)
- Top scorer: Jagger Firkus (Moose Jaw Warriors)

Playoffs
- Playoffs MVP: Denton Mateychuk (Warriors)
- Finals champions: Moose Jaw Warriors (1)
- Runners-up: Portland Winterhawks

WHL seasons
- 2022–23 2024–25

2023–24 CHL seasons
- League: Canadian Hockey League
- Sport: Ice hockey
- Duration: OHL; September 2023–May 2024; QMJHL; September 2023–May 2024; WHL; September 2023–May 2024
- Teams: 60
- TV partner(s): CBC Television/Gem, TSN, RDS, Rogers TV, Shaw TV
- Season MVP: Jagger Firkus (Moose Jaw Warriors) (WHL)
- Top scorer: Jagger Firkus (Moose Jaw Warriors) (WHL)

Memorial Cup
- Finals champions: Saginaw Spirit (OHL) (1st title)
- Runners-up: London Knights (WHL)

The 2023–24 WHL season was the 58th season of the Western Hockey League (WHL). The regular season started on September 22, 2023, and ended on March 24, 2024, with the playoffs beginning on March 28 and ending on May 15. The Moose Jaw Warriors won their first Ed Chynoweth Cup in franchise history, defeating the Portland Winterhawks in the championship series, and earned a spot in the 2024 Memorial Cup. The Memorial Cup tournament was hosted by the Ontario Hockey League's Saginaw Spirit at Dow Event Center in Saginaw, Michigan.

Prior to the season, the 2022–23 finalist Winnipeg Ice were sold and relocated to Wenatchee, Washington, and became the Wenatchee Wild, making 2023–24 their inaugural season. Female referees made their league debut in February 2023, when Alex Clarke and Cianna Lieffers officiated. The Saskatoon Blades topped the regular season standings for the fifth time in franchise history, before losing the Eastern Conference final against Moose Jaw in a seven-game series that saw a league-record six overtime games.

== Standings ==
=== Conference standings ===
Western Conference
Pos	Div	Team	Pld	W	L	OTL	SOL	GF	GA	Pts
1	B.C.	x, y – Prince George Cougars	68	49	15	1	3	316	187	102
2	U.S.	x, y – Portland Winterhawks	68	48	15	4	1	330	204	101
3	U.S.	x – Everett Silvertips	68	45	18	2	3	296	208	95
4	U.S.	x – Wenatchee Wild	68	34	30	4	0	249	268	72
5	B.C.	x – Kelowna Rockets	68	33	30	4	1	250	255	71
6	B.C.	x – Vancouver Giants	68	32	32	4	0	222	249	68
7	B.C.	x – Victoria Royals	68	29	30	5	4	221	272	67
8	U.S.	x – Spokane Chiefs	68	30	32	5	1	268	283	66
9	U.S.	e – Seattle Thunderbirds	68	27	38	2	1	191	260	57
10	U.S.	e – Tri-City Americans	68	23	42	2	1	206	306	49
11	B.C.	e – Kamloops Blazers	68	20	42	3	3	180	295	46

Source: "Standings". CHL.ca. WHL.
e – eliminated from playoff contention; x – clinched playoff; y – clinched division

Eastern Conference
Pos	Div	Team	Pld	W	L	OTL	SOL	GF	GA	Pts
1	East	x, y, z – Saskatoon Blades	68	50	13	2	3	255	163	105
2	Central	x, y – Swift Current Broncos	68	40	22	4	2	286	239	86
3	East	x – Moose Jaw Warriors	68	44	21	0	3	297	228	91
4	Central	x – Medicine Hat Tigers	68	37	23	6	2	280	231	82
5	Central	x – Red Deer Rebels	68	33	26	3	6	213	217	75
6	East	x – Brandon Wheat Kings	68	33	28	6	1	225	244	73
7	Central	x – Lethbridge Hurricanes	68	33	28	7	0	214	210	73
8	East	x – Prince Albert Raiders	68	31	32	2	3	214	211	67
9	Central	e – Calgary Hitmen	68	28	31	8	1	255	250	65
10	Central	e – Edmonton Oil Kings	68	27	37	3	1	227	301	58
11	East	e – Regina Pats	68	22	40	4	2	208	300	50

Source: "Standings". CHL.ca. WHL.
e – eliminated from playoff contention; x – clinched playoff; y – clinched division; z – best regular season record

== Statistical leaders ==
=== Scoring leaders ===
Players are listed by points, then goals.

Note: GP = Games played; G = Goals; A = Assists; Pts. = Points; PIM = Penalty minutes

Player	Team	GP	G	A	Pts	PIM
Jagger Firkus	Moose Jaw Warriors	63	61	65	126	30
Zac Funk	Prince George Cougars	68	67	56	123	63
Riley Heidt	Prince George Cougars	66	37	80	117	42
Berkly Catton	Spokane Chiefs	68	54	62	116	41
Andrew Cristall	Kelowna Rockets	62	40	71	111	46
Conner Roulette	Spokane Chiefs	68	45	63	108	40
Gabe Klassen	Portland Winterhawks	67	35	71	106	28
Terik Parascak	Prince George Cougars	68	43	62	105	41
James Stefan	Portland Winterhawks	67	50	51	101	51
Trevor Wong	Saskatoon Blades	68	15	86	101	39

=== Leading goaltenders ===
These are the goaltenders that lead the league in GAA that played at least 420 minutes.

Note: GP = Games played; Mins = Minutes played; W = Wins; L = Losses; OTL = Overtime losses; SOL = Shootout losses; SO = Shutouts; GAA = Goals against average; Sv% = Save percentage

Player	Team	GP	Mins	W	L	OTL	SOL	SO	GAA	Sv%
Evan Gardner	Saskatoon Blades	30	1,665	21	5	0	2	4	1.91	.927
Jan Špunar	Portland Winterhawks	35	2,009	25	6	2	1	2	2.12	.913
Austin Elliott	Saskatoon Blades	43	2,437	29	8	2	1	4	2.39	.904
Joshua Ravensbergen	Prince George Cougars	38	2,072	26	4	1	1	6	2.46	.907
Tyler Palmer	Everett Silvertips	46	2,615	30	9	2	3	1	2.57	.907

== 2024 WHL Playoffs ==
Conference Quarterfinals	Conference Semifinals
E1	Saskatoon	4
E8	Prince Albert	1
E1	Saskatoon	4
E5	Red Deer	0
E2	Swift Current	4
E7	Lethbridge	0
Eastern
E3	Moose Jaw	4
E6	Brandon	0
E2	Swift Current	1
E3	Moose Jaw	4
E4	Medicine Hat	1
E5	Red Deer	4
Note: Pairings are re-seeded after the first round.
W1	Prince George	4
W8	Spokane	0
W1	Prince George	4
W5	Kelowna	1
W2	Portland	4
W7	Victoria	0
Western
W3	Everett	4
W6	Vancouver	1
W2	Portland	4
W3	Everett	0
W4	Wenatchee	2
W5	Kelowna	4

Conference Finals
E1	Saskatoon	3
E3	Moose Jaw	4
W1	Prince George	2
W2	Portland	4

WHL Championship
E3	Moose Jaw	4
W2	Portland	0

== Conference quarterfinals ==
=== Eastern Conference ===
==== (E1) Saskatoon Blades vs. (E8) Prince Albert Raiders ====
March 28	Prince Albert Raiders	4–3	Saskatoon Blades	SaskTel Centre	Recap
No scoring		First period	19:40 - pp - Egor Sidorov (1)
Aiden Oiring (1) - 8:41; 10:53 - Easton Kovacs (1) - 10:53; Ryder Ritchie (1) - pp - 14:19		Second period	0:59 - Alexander Suzdalev (1)
Niall Crocker (1) - pp - 8:13		Third period	16:45 - Egor Sidorov (2)
Max Hildebrand (41 saves / 44 shots)		Goalie stats	Austin Elliott (16 saves / 20 shots)

March 29	Prince Albert Raiders	1–4	Saskatoon Blades	SaskTel Centre	Recap
No scoring		First period	2:02 - John Babcock (1)
No scoring		Second period	3:15 - pp - Egor Sidorov (3)
Niall Crocker (2) - pp - 19:14		Third period	4:16 - pp - Easton Armstrong (1); 14:24 - pp - Tyler Parr (1)
Max Hildebrand (26 saves / 30 shots)		Goalie stats	Evan Gardner (31 saves / 32 shots)

April 2	Saskatoon Blades	4–3	OT	Prince Albert Raiders	Art Hauser Centre	Recap
5:56 - Easton Armstrong (2) - 5:56; Easton Armstrong (3) - 9:03		First period		No scoring
Trevor Wong (1) - 17:13		Second period		2:51 - Krzysztof Macias (1); 11:32 - pp - Ryder Ritchie (2)
No scoring		Third period		14:22 - Aiden Oiring (2)
Easton Armstrong (4) - pp - 0:23		First overtime period		No scoring
Evan Gardner (18 saves / 21 shots)		Goalie stats		Max Hildebrand (31 saves / 35 shots)

April 3	Saskatoon Blades	4–1	Prince Albert Raiders	Art Hauser Centre	Recap
Easton Armstrong (5) - pp - 19:58		First period	No scoring
Misha Volotovskii (1) - 3:00; Tanner Molendyk (1) - 6:03		Second period	No scoring
Egor Sidorov (4) - en - 17:59		Third period	4:02 - pp - Ryder Ritchie (3)
Evan Gardner (15 saves / 16 shots)		Goalie stats	Max Hildebrand(32 saves / 35 shots)

April 5	Prince Albert Raiders	2–6	Saskatoon Blades	SaskTel Centre	Recap
Niall Crocker (3) - 14:13		First period	3:24 - Brandon Lisowsky (1); 5:57 - Ben Saunderson (1); 7:10 - Alexander Suzdalev (2); 12:36 - Fraser Minten (1)
No scoring		Second period	No scoring
Harrison Lodewyk (1) - 15:06		Third period	16:00 - en - Trevor Wong (2); 17:49 - sh - en - Charlie Wright (1)
Max Hildebrand (35 saves / 39 shots)		Goalie stats	Evan Gardner (8 saves/9 shots); Austin Elliott (15 shots / 16 saves)

Saskatoon wins series 4–1

==== (E2) Swift Current Broncos vs. (E7) Lethbridge Hurricanes ====
March 29	Lethbridge Hurricanes	0–3	Swift Current Broncos	InnovationPlex	Recap
No scoring		First period	8:25 - Caleb Wyrostok (1); 18:26 - pp - Conor Geekie (1)
No scoring		Second period	No scoring
No scoring		Third period	6:01 - Clarke Caswell (1)
Harrison Meneghin (30 saves / 33 shots)		Goalie stats	Reid Dyck (33 saves / 33 shots)

March 30	Lethbridge Hurricanes	3–4	Swift Current Broncos	InnovationPlex	Recap
Leo Braillard (1) - 3:22		First period	No scoring
Sean Tschigerl (1) - 17:21		Second period	14:24 - pp - Josh Filmon (1)
Hayden Pakkala (1) - 17:50		Third period	2:38 - Ryan McCleary (1); 5:30 - pp - Connor Hvidston (1); 17:46 - en - Conor Geekie (2)
Harrison Meneghin (37 saves / 40 shots)		Goalie stats	Reid Dyck (29 saves / 32 saves)

April 2	Swift Current Broncos	5–3	Lethbridge Hurricanes	Enmax Centre	Recap
Luke Mistelbacher (1) - 0:37; Luke Mistelbacher (2) - pp - 6:40		First period	17:45 - Dylan Sydor (1)
Josh Filmon (2) - pp - 1:38; Luke Mistelbacher (3) - pp - 8:05; Conor Geekie (3) - pp - 15:18		Second period	1:03 - sh - Sean Tschigerl (2)
No scoring		Third period	7:43 - pp - Brayden Edwards (1)
Reid Dyck (28 saves / 31 shots)		Goalie stats	Harrison Meneghin (11 saves / 15 shots); Brady Smith (13 saves / 14 shots)

April 3	Swift Current Broncos	5–4	2OT	Lethbridge Hurricanes	Enmax Centre	Recap
Josh Filmon (3) - 19:20		First period		1:27 - Trae Wilke (1); 8:58 - Carter Dereniwsky (1); 15:15 - Brayden Edwards (2)
Clarke Caswell (2) - pp - 13:12; Luke Mistelbacher (4) - 14:57		Second period		3:27 - Hayden Pakkala (2)
Grayson Burzynski (1) - 11:23		Third period		No scoring
Conor Geekie (4) - 0:37		Second overtime period		No scoring
Reid Dyck (37 saves / 41 shots)		Goalie stats		Harrison Meneghin (40 saves / 45 shots)

Swift Current wins series 4–0

==== (E3) Moose Jaw Warriors vs. (E6) Brandon Wheat Kings ====
March 29	Brandon Wheat Kings	4–7	Moose Jaw Warriors	Moose Jaw Events Centre	Recap
No scoring		First period	3:05 - Martin Ryšavý (1); 4:42 - Brayden Schuurman (1); 6:15 - Jagger Firkus (1)
Roger McQueen (1) - 2:49; Jayden Wiens (1) - 19:00		Second period	3:57 - Owen Berge (1); 6:10 - Martin Ryšavý (2)
Caleb Hadland (1) - 3:25; Jayden Wiens (2) - 13:36		Third period	7:27 - Matthew Savoie (1); 17:35 - en - Brayden Schuurman (2)
Carson Bjarnason (17 saves / 22 shots); Ethan Eskit (20 saves / 21 shots)		Goalie stats	Jackson Unger (33 saves / 37 shots)

March 30	Brandon Wheat Kings	4–5	OT	Moose Jaw Warriors	Moose Jaw Events Centre	Recap
12:17 - Dominik Petr (1) - 12:17; Roger McQueen (2) - 12:23		First period		8:43 - Brayden Yager (1); 16:18 - sh - Atley Calvert (1)
Rylen Roersma (1) - sh - 7:00; Roger McQueen (3) - 14:31		Second period		18:03 - Matthew Savoie (2); 18:26 - Pavel McKenzie (1)
No scoring		Third period		No scoring
No scoring		First overtime period		2:15 - Lynden Lakovic (1)
Carson Bjarnason (34 saves / 39 shots)		Goalie stats		Jackson Unger (30 saves / 34 shots)

April 3	Moose Jaw Warriors	6–4	Brandon Wheat Kings	Westoba Place	Recap
Owen Berge (2) - 9:29; Brayden Yager (2) - 10:37; Matthew Savoie (3) - pp - 11:50		First period	8:33 - Matteo Michels (1)
Matthew Savoie (4) - 10:33		Second period	No scoring
Connor Schmidt (1) - 7:17; Denton Mateychuk (1) - pp - 8:59		Third period	1:44 - Roger McQueen (4); 17:20 - pp - Brett Hyland (1); 18:05 - Jayden Wiens (3)
Jackson Unger (35 saves / 39 shots)		Goalie stats	Carson Bjarnason (35 saves / 41 shots)

April 4	Moose Jaw Warriors	6–2	Brandon Wheat Kings	Westoba Place	Recap
Rilen Kovacevic (1) - 3:00; Atley Calvert (2) - 4:27; Lynden Lakovic (2) - 9:33; Denton Mateychuk (2) - 18:40		First period	4:06 - Carter Klippenstein (1)
Matthew Savoie (5) - 7:50		Second period	18:08 - Rylen Roersma (2)
Jagger Firkus (2) - en - 19:42		Third period	No scoring
Jackson Unger (35 saves / 37 shots)		Goalie stats	Carson Bjarnason (17 shots / 22 saves); Ethan Eskit (20 saves / 20 shots)

Moose Jaw wins series 4–0

==== (E4) Medicine Hat Tigers vs. (E5) Red Deer Rebels ====
March 29	Red Deer Rebels	5–4	2OT	Medicine Hat Tigers	Co-op Place	Recap
No scoring		First period		6:17 - Oasiz Wiesblatt (1); 7:17 - Andrew Basha (1); 19:30 - Gavin McKenna (1)
Kai Uchacz (1) - 7:58; Carson Latimer (1) - pp - 14:08		Second period		2:04 - Josh Van Mulligen (1)
Mats Lindgren (1) - 7:29; Ollie Josephson (1) - 14:10		Third period		No scoring
Kalan Lind (1) - 1:15		Second overtime period		No scoring
Chase Wutzke (38 shots / 42 saves)		Goalie stats		Ethan McCallum (29 saves / 34 shots)

March 30	Red Deer Rebels	1–3	Medicine Hat Tigers	Co-op Place	Recap
No scoring		First period	0:21 - Gavin McKenna (2)
No scoring		Second period	9:22 - Reid Andresen (1); 15:28 - pp - Cayden Lindstrom (1)
Ollie Josephson (2) - 6:32		Third period	No scoring
Chase Wutzke (23 saves / 26 shots)		Goalie stats	Zach Zahara (30 saves / 31 shots)

April 2	Medicine Hat Tigers	3–4	OT	Red Deer Rebels	Peavey Mart Centrium	Recap
Hayden Harsanyi (1) - 9:48		First period		19:59 - sh - Carson Latimer (2)
Oasiz Wiesblatt (2) - 6:12		Second period		6:59 - pp - Carson Latimer (3); 15:10 - Hunter Mayo (1)
Andrew Basha (1) - 19:25		Third period		No scoring
No scoring		First overtime period		6:31 - pp - Samuel Drancak (1)
Zach Zahara (32 saves / 36 shots)		Goalie stats		Chase Wutzke (35 saves / 38 shots)

April 3	Medicine Hat Tigers	2–3	Red Deer Rebels	Peavey Mart Centrium	Recap
Tyler MacKenzie (1) - 11:42		First period	8:30 - sh - Jhett Larson (1)
Hunter St. Martin (1) - 7:37		Second period	6:54 - Carson Birnie (1)
No scoring		Third period	19:58 - pp - Kalan Lind (2)
Ethan McCallum (31 shots / 34 saves)		Goalie stats	Chase Wutzke (33 saves / 35 saves)

April 5	Red Deer Rebels	5–2	Medicine Hat Tigers	Co-op Place	Recap
Carson Latimer (4) - 2:56; Dwayne Jean Jr. (1) - 10:52		First period	No scoring
Frantisek Formanek (1) - 15:48		Second period	No scoring
Kai Uchacz (2) - pp - 4:37; Talon Brigley (1) - 5:06		Third period	10:57 - Andrew Basha (3); 15:47 - Nate Corbet (1)
Chase Wutzke (36 shots / 38 saves)		Goalie stats	Zach Zahara (7 shots / 9 saves); Ethan McCallum (13 shots / 16 saves)

Red Deer wins series 4–1

=== Western Conference ===
==== (W1) Prince George Cougars vs. (W8) Spokane Chiefs ====
March 29	Spokane Chiefs	1–6	Prince George Cougars	CN Centre	Recap
Conner Roulette (1) - 3:09		First period	3:48 - Ondřej Becher (1); 15:31 - pp - Terik Parascak (1); 16:38 - Keaton Dowhaniuk (1)
No scoring		Second period	14:30 - Terik Parascak (2); 19:00 - pp - Terik Parascak (3)
No scoring		Third period	3:47 - pp - Borya Valis (1)
Damson Cowan (45 saves / 51 saves)		Goalie stats	Joshua Ravensbergen (24 saves / 25 shots)

March 30	Spokane Chiefs	4–7	Prince George Cougars	CN Centre	Recap
No scoring		First period	9:31 - Keaton Dowhaniuk (2)
No scoring		Second period	2:22 - Oren Shtrom (1); 8:35 - pp - Ondřej Becher (2); 14:24 - Aiden Foster (1); 15:25 - Carlin Dezainde (1); 15:37 - Viliam Kmec (1)
Owen Martin (1) - 0:58; Hayden Paupanekis (1) - pp - 8:34; Layton Feist (1) - 14:18; Layton Feist (2) - 18:50		Third period	19:26 - en - Terik Parascak (4)
Dawson Cowan (10 saves / 16 shots); Cooper Michaluk (11 saves / 11 shots)		Goalie stats	Joshua Ravensbergen (26 saves / 30 shots)

April 2	Prince George Cougars	4–2	Spokane Chiefs	Spokane Arena	Recap
Zac Funk (1) - pp - 17:30		First period	12:30 - Hayden Paupanekis (1)
Borya Valis (2) - 5:40; Hudson Thornton (1) - pp - 13:06		Second period	No scoring
Zac Funk (2) - 5:59		Third period	6:29 - Ty Cheveldayoff (1)
Joshua Ravensbergen (28 saves / 30 shots)		Goalie stats	Cooper Michaluk (29 saves / 33 shots)

April 3	Prince George Cougars	3–2	Spokane Chiefs	Spokane Arena	Recap
Viliam Kmec (3) - 10:14		First period	No scoring
Koehn Ziemmer (1) - 9:35; Zac Funk (3) - pp - 11:27		Second period	1:36 - Conner Roulette (2); 13:10 - Conner Roulette (3)
No scoring		Third period	No scoring
Ty Young (30 saves / 32 shots)		Goalie stats	Dawson Cowan (28 shots / 31 saves)

Prince George wins series 4–0

==== (W2) Portland Winterhawks vs. (W7) Victoria Royals ====
March 29	Victoria Royals	3–4	Portland Winterhawks	Veterans Memorial Coliseum	Recap
Tyson Laventure (1) - 9:45		First period	8:31 - Luca Cagnoni (1)
Tanner Scott (1) - 18:03		Second period	No scoring
Nate Misskey (1) - pp - 19:36		Third period	5:00 - Carter Sotheran (1); 10:18 - Gabe Klassen (1); 13:55 - pp - Luca Cagnoni (2)
Braden Holt (30 saves / 34 shots)		Goalie stats	Jan Špunar (22 saves / 25 shots)

March 30	Victoria Royals	1–5	Portland Winterhawks	Veterans Memorial Coliseum	Recap
No scoring		First period	4:37 - pp - James Stefan (1); 11:25 - Luca Cagnoni (3); 19:09 - James Stefan (2)
Dawson Pasternak (1) - pp 1:34		Second period	13:59 - pp - Josh Davies (1)
No scoring		Third period	1:03 - Nate Danielson (1)
Braden Holt (28 saves / 33 shots)		Goalie stats	Jan Špunar (19 saves / 20 shots)

April 2	Portland Winterhawks	6–5	Victoria Royals	Save-On-Foods Memorial Centre	Recap
James Stefan (3) - 15:36; James Stefan (4) - 16:49		First period	6:03 Teydon Trembecky (1)
Josh Mori (1) - 16:49; James Stefan (5) 18:05		Second period	1:36 - Justin Kipkie (1); 3:22 - Tanner Scott (2)
Josh Davies (2) - pp - 9:54; Gabe Klassen (2) - 12:57		Third period	0:28 - Casper Evensen Haugen (1); 19:14 - Tyson Laventure (2)
Jan Špunar (30 saves / 35 shots)		Goalie stats	Braden Holt (26 saves / 32 shots)

April 3	Portland Winterhawks	4–1	Victoria Royals	Save-On-Foods Memorial Centre	Recap
Josh Zakreski (1) - 3:24; Josh Zakreski (2) - 7:31		First period	17:02 - pp - Cole Reschny (1)
Josh Davies (3) - 16:35		Second period	No scoring
Kyle Chyzowski (1) - 2:32		Third period	No scoring
Jan Špunar (20 saves / 21 shots)		Goalie stats	Braden Holt (41 shots / 45 saves)

Portland wins series 4–0

==== (W3) Everett Silvertips vs. (W6) Vancouver Giants ====
March 29	Vancouver Giants	6–4	Everett Silvertips	Angel of the Winds Arena	Recap
Cameron Schmidt (1) - 0:43; Kyren Gronick (1) - pp - 13:32; Cameron Schmidt (2) - pp - 18:03; Ty Halaburda (1) - pp - 18:17		First period	13:47 - Ben Hemmerling (1); 17:28 - sh - Ben Hemmerling (2)
No scoring		Second period	4:41 - pp - Kaden Hammell (1)
Logen Hammett (1) - en - 19:11; Samuel Honzek (1) - en - 19:25		Third period	19:40 - Niko Tsakumis (1)
Brett Mirwald (38 saves / 42 shots)		Goalie stats	Tyler Palmer (5 saves / 9 shots); Ethan Chadwick (12 saves / 12 shots)

March 30	Vancouver Giants	1–2	Everett Silvertips	Angel of the Winds Arena	Recap
No scoring		First period	9:31 - Austin Roest (1)
London Hoilett (1) - 7:20		Second period	3:43 - Austin Roest (2)
No scoring		Third period	No scoring
Brett Mirwald (53 saves / 55 shots)		Goalie stats	Tyler Palmer (20 saves / 21 shots)

April 3	Everett Silvertips	3–1	Vancouver Giants	Langley Events Centre	Recap
Parker Berge (1) - pp - 8:50		First period	No scoring
Julius Miettinen (1) - pp - 8:49		Second period	5:12 - Logen Hammett (2)
Dominik Rymon (1) - 12:14		Third period	No scoring
Tyler Palmer (30 saves / 31 shots)		Goalie stats	Brett Mirwald (32 saves / 35 saves)

April 5	Everett Silvertips	4–1	Vancouver Giants	Langley Events Centre	Recap
Kaden Hammell (1) - pp - 19:06		First period	No scoring
Jesse Heslop (1) - 18:59		Second period	16:38 - sh - Samuel Honzek (2)
Austin Roest (3) - 0:36; Parker Berge (2) - pp - 9:16		Third period	No scoring
Tyler Palmer (24 saves / 25 shots)		Goalie stats	Brett Mirwald (53 saves / 57 shots)

April 7	Vancouver Giants	0–5	Everett Silvertips	Angel of the Winds Arena	Recap
No scoring		First period	15:46 - pp - Parker Berge (3)
No scoring		Second period	1:10 - pp - Ben Hemmerling (4); 16:14 - Cade Zaplitny (1)
No scoring		Third period	0:39 - Dominik Rymon (2); 4:36 - Julius Miettinen (2)
Brett Mirwald 43 saves / 48 shots)		Goalie stats	Tyler Palmer (25 saves / 25 shots)

Everett wins series 4–1

==== (W4) Wenatchee Wild vs. (W5) Kelowna Rockets ====
March 29	Kelowna Rockets	6–8	Wenatchee Wild	Town Toyota Center	Recap
Tij Iginla (1) - 1:07; Max Graham (1) - pp - 11:42; Gabriel Szturc (1) - 17:03; Tij Iginla (2) - 17:15		First period	12:57 - pp - Briley Wood (1)
Tij Iginla (3) - pp - 6:18; 19:03 - Marek Ročák (1) - 19:03		Second period	0:20 - Evan Friesen (1); 13:48 - pp - Briley Wood (2); 16:39 - pp - Karter Prosofsky (1); 17:04 - pp - Graham Sward (1); 19:49 - Briley Wood (3)
No scoring		Third period	7:06 - Briley Wood (4); 19:58 - en - Kenta Isogai (1)
Jari Kykkanen (29 saves / 36 shots)		Goalie stats	Daniel Hauser (29 saves / 35 shots)

March 30	Kelowna Rockets	3–1	Wenatchee Wild	Town Toyota Center	Recap
Andrew Cristall (1) - 1:10; Trae Johnson (1) - 12:34		First period	No scoring
No scoring		Second period	11:14 - Sam Ward (1)
Luke Schelter (1) - en - 17:29		Third period	No scoring
Jari Kykkanen (21 saves / 22 shots)		Goalie stats	Daniel Hauser (24 saves / 26 shots)

April 2	Wenatchee Wild	1–5	Kelowna Rockets	Prospera Place	Recap
Briley Wood (5) - pp - 5:55		First period	17:21 - Tij Iginla (4); 18:36 - Marek Ročák (2)
No scoring		Second period	18:43 - Caden Price (1)
No scoring		Third period	8:07 - Tij Iginla (5); Luke Schelter (2) - 16:10
Daniel Hauser (19 saves / 23 shots)		Goalie stats	Jari Kykkanen (31 shots / 32 saves)

April 3	Wenatchee Wild	1–3	Kelowna Rockets	Prospera Place	Recap
No scoring		First period	9:08 - pp - Max Graham (2); 14:30 - Tij Iginla (6)
Kenta Isogai (2) - 3:29		Second period	No scoring
No scoring		Third period	8:58 - Gabriel Szturc (2)
Daniel Hauser (30 saves / 33 shots)		Goalie stats	Jari Kykkanen (34 saves / 35 shots)

April 5	Kelowna Rockets	4–5	OT	Wenatchee Wild	Town Toyota Center	Recap
Michael Cicek (1) - pp - 11:59		First period		0:44 - Kenta Isogai (3); 13:41 - sh - Kenta Isogai (4)
No scoring		Second period		17:38 - pp - Briley Wood (6)
Gabriel Szturc (3) - pp - 9:47; Gabriel Szturc (4) - pp - 17:30; Tij Iginla (7) - pp - 19:13		Third period		11:01 - pp - Evan Friesen (2)
No scoring		First overtime period		0:54 - Steven Arp (1)
Jari Kykkanen (26 saves / 31 shots)		Goalie stats		Daniel Hauser (27 saves / 31 shots)

April 7	Wenatchee Wild	2–4	Kelowna Rockets	Prospera Place	Recap
No scoring		First period	8:54 - Andrew Cristall (2)
Maddix McCagherty (1) - 13:42		Second period	9:30 - Tij Iginla (8)
Evan Friesen (3) - 17:52		Third period	5:34 - Andrew Cristall (3); 16:04 - en - Max Graham (3)
Daniel Hauser (29 saves / 32 shots)		Goalie stats	Jari Kykkanen (34 saves / 36 shots)

Kelowna wins series 4–2

== Conference semifinals ==
=== Eastern Conference ===
==== (E1) Saskatoon Blades vs. (E5) Red Deer Rebels ====
April 12	Red Deer Rebels	1–4	Saskatoon Blades	SaskTel Centre	Recap
No scoring		First period	8:32 - Fraser Minten (2)
Carson Birnie (2) - 5:29		Second period	8:59 - Vaughn Watterodt (1); 13:02 - pp - Fraser Minten (3)
No scoring		Third period	19:11 - en - Brandon Lisowsky (2)
Chase Wutzke (20 saves / 23 shots)		Goalie stats	Evan Gardner (16 saves / 17 shots)

April 14	Red Deer Rebels	1–2	OT	Saskatoon Blades	SaskTel Centre	Recap
No scoring		First period		No scoring
No scoring		Second period		11:10 - Fraser Minten (4)
Kalan Lind (3) - pp - 4:10		Third period		No scoring
No scoring		First overtime period		17:01 - Ben Saunderson (2)
Chase Wutzke (47 saves / 49 shots)		Goalie stats		Evan Gardner (24 saves / 25 shots)

April 16	Saskatoon Blades	8–5	Red Deer Rebels	Peavey Mart Centrium	Recap
Charlie Wright (2) - 2:36; Rowan Calvert (1) - 7:31; Egor Sidorov (5) - 7:51		First period	2:50 - Carson Latimer (5); 11:36 - sh - Carson Birnie (3)
Trevor Wong (3) - 2:57; Egor Sidorov (6) - 8:15; Egor Sidorov (7) - 18:35		Second period	2:16 - Quentin Bourne (1); 15:02 - Kalan Lind (4)
Brandon Lisowsky (3) - pp - 6:27; Lukas Hansen (1) - en - 18:40		Third period	11:58 - sh - Talon Brigley (2)
Evan Gardner (16 saves / 20 shots); Austin Elliott (16 saves / 17 shots)		Goalie stats	Taylor Tabashniuk (31 saves / 38 shots)

April 17	Saskatoon Blades	7–0	Red Deer Rebels	Peavey Mart Centrium	Recap
Egor Sidorov (8) - 3:12; Rowan Calvert (2) - sh - 6:11; Egor Sidorov (9) - 16:48; Brandon Lisowsky (4) - 18:48		First period	No scoring
Egor Sidorov (10) - 2:15; Fraser Minten (5) - 13:03		Second period	No scoring
Alexander Suzdalev (3) - 4:52		Third period	No scoring
Evan Gardner (26 saves / 26 shots)		Goalie stats	Taylor Tabashniuk (24 saves / 31 shots)

Saskatoon wins series 4–0

==== (E2) Swift Current Broncos vs. (E3) Moose Jaw Warriors ====
April 12	Moose Jaw Warriors	2–7	Swift Current Broncos	Moose Jaw Events Centre	Recap
No scoring		First period	14:49 - Brady Birnie (1); 15:27 - Josh Filmon (4)
Brayden Yager (3) - pp - 18:32; Jagger Firkus (3) - 19:48		Second period	8:25 - pp - Josh Filmon (5); 12:57 - Brady Birnie (2)
No scoring		Third period	4:50 - Connor Hvidston (2); 7:18 - Mathew Ward (1); 10:56 - Ty Coupland (1)
Jackson Unger (18 saves / 24 shots); Dimitri Fortin (7 saves / 8 shots)		Goalie stats	Reid Dyck (33 saves / 35 shots)

April 13	Moose Jaw Warriors	7–2	Swift Current Broncos	Moose Jaw Events Centre	Recap
Brayden Yager (4) - sh - 17:41		First period	11:25 - Josh Filmon (6)
Brayden Yager (5) - pp - 1:56; Denton Mateychuk (3) - 2:35; Jagger Firkus (4) - 4:36; Martin Ryšavý (3) - 10:47; Kalem Parker (1) - 12:40		Second period	No scoring
No scoring		Third period	14:28 - sh - Caleb Wyrostok (2)
Jackson Unger (25 saves / 27 shots)		Goalie stats	Reid Dyck (18 saves / 25 shots); Joey Rocha (14 saves / 14 shots)

April 16	Swift Current Broncos	3–5	Moose Jaw Warriors	InnovationPlex	Recap
Ty Coupland (2) - 5:33		First period	12:16 - pp - Atley Calvert (3); 12:35 - Lynden Lakovic (3); 13:37 - Denton Mateychuk (4)
Owen Pickering (1) - 1:26; Brady Birnie (3) - 3:01		Second period	19:12 - Denton Mateychuk (5)
No scoring		Third period	19:20 - en - Matthew Savoie (6)
Reid Dyck (29 saves / 33 shots)		Goalie stats	Jackson Unger (25 saves / 28 shots)

April 17	Swift Current Broncos	2–5	Moose Jaw Warriors	InnovationPlex	Recap
Conor Geekie (5) - 8:17		First period	17:36 - Ethan Hughes (1)
Caleb Wyrostok (3) - 2:04		Second period	12:22 - Jagger Firkus (5)
No scoring		Third period	5:05 - Brayden Yager (7); 9:56 - Rilen Kovacevic (2); 16:02 - en - Jagger Firkus (6)
Reid Dyck (30 saves / 34 shots)		Goalie stats	Jackson Unger (36 saves / 38 shots)

April 19	Moose Jaw Warriors	4–2	Swift Current Broncos	Moose Jaw Events Centre	Recap
Jagger Firkus (7) - 6:10; Jagger Firkus (8) - pp - 12:08		First period	5:32 - Josh Filmon (7)
Jagger Firkus (9) - pp - 5:54		Second period	No scoring
Matthew Savoie (7) - en - 19:09		Third period	13:27 - pp - Conor Geekie (6)
Jackson Unger (34 saves / 36 shots)		Goalie stats	Reid Dyck (35 saves / 38 shots)

Moose Jaw wins series 4–1

=== Western Conference ===
==== (W1) Prince George Cougars vs. (W5) Kelowna Rockets ====
April 12	Kelowna Rockets	0–4	Prince George Cougars	CN Centre	Recap
No scoring		First period	18:34 - Ephram McNutt (1)
No scoring		Second period	3:24 - sh - Terik Parascak (5)
No scoring		Third period	1:34 - Keaton Dowhaniuk (3); 4:02 - Borya Valis (3)
Jari Kykkanen (29 saves / 33 shots)		Goalie stats	Joshua Ravensbergen (21 saves / 21 shots)

April 13	Kelowna Rockets	0–5	Prince George Cougars	CN Centre	Recap
No scoring		First period	1:49 - Riley Heidt (1); 3:58 - sh - Viliam Kmec (3)
No scoring		Second period	11:15 - Zac Funk (4)
No scoring		Third period	0:46 - Borya Valis (4); 14:39 - Oren Shtrom (2)
Jari Kykkanen (39 saves / 44 shots)		Goalie stats	Joshua Ravensbergen (16 saves / 16 shots)

April 16	Prince George Cougars	4–3	OT	Kelowna Rockets	Prospera Place	Recap
Hudson Thornton (2) - pp - 4:19		First period		No scoring
Ondřej Becher (3) - pp - 13:04		Second period		5:13 - Ethan Neutens (1); 6:04 - Michael Cicek (2)
Borya Valis (5) - 10:25		Third period		14:08 - Gabriel Szturc (5)
Matteo Danis (1) - 1:22		First overtime period		No scoring
Joshua Ravensbergen (32 saves / 35 shots)		Goalie stats		Jari Kykkanen (29 saves / 33 shots)

April 17	Prince George Cougars	1–2	Kelowna Rockets	Prospera Place	Recap
No scoring		First period	No scoring
No scoring		Second period	15:14 - Max Graham (4); 19:12 - Gabriel Szturc (6)
Hudson Thornton (3) - 16:37		Third period	No scoring
Ty Young (27 saves / 29 shots)		Goalie stats	Jari Kykkanen (26 saves / 27 shots)

April 19	Kelowna Rockets	3–6	Prince George Cougars	CN Centre	Recap
No scoring		First period	7:55 - pp - Zac Funk (5)
Andrew Cristall (4) - 4:03; Tij Iginla (9) - 4:18		Second period	9:10 - Jett Lajoie (1); 10:28 - Zac Funk (6); 13:43 - Riley Heidt (2); 17:44 - Riley Heidt (3); 19:28 - pp - Zac Funk (7)
Gabriel Szturc (7) - 2:51		Third period	No scoring
Jari Kykkanen (33 saves / 39 shots)		Goalie stats	Joshua Ravensbergen (28 saves / 31 shots)

Prince George wins series 4–1

==== (W2) Portland Winterhawks vs. (W3) Everett Silvertips ====
April 12	Everett Silvertips	2–8	Portland Winterhawks	Veterans Memorial Coliseum	Recap
Tarin Smith (1) - 12:46		First period	2:38 - pp - Tyson Jugnauth (1); 11:50 - Tyson Yaremko (1); 12:23 - Josh Davies (4)
Parker Berge (4) - pp - 7:20		Second period	3:12 - sh - Tyson Jugnauth (2); 5:53 - pp - Kyle Chyzowski (2); 9:18 - pp - Kyle Chyzowski (3)
No scoring		Third period	8:48 - Nate Danielson (2); 9:11 - Jack O'Brien (1)
Tyler Palmer (23 shots / 29 saves); Ethan Chadwick (16 saves / 18 shots)		Goalie stats	Jan Špunar (21 saves / 23 shots)

April 13	Everett Silvertips	1–6	Portland Winterhawks	Veterans Memorial Coliseum	Recap
13:18 - pp - Beau Courtney (1)		First period	7:25 - Marek Alscher (1); 12:32 - Kyle Chyzowski (4); 14:58 - pp - Kyle Chyzowski (5); 19:39 - Tyson Jugnauth (3)
No scoring		Second period	13:42 - pp - Nate Danielson (3)
No scoring		Third period	5:35 - Carter Sotheran (2)
Tyler Palmer (37 saves / 43 shots)		Goalie stats	Jan Špunar (32 saves / 33 shots)

April 15	Portland Winterhawks	4–3	OT	Everett Silvertips	Angel of the Winds Arena	Recap
No scoring		First period		14:30 - Kaden Hammell (3); 15:31 - pp - Beau Courtney (2)
Carter Sotheran (3) - pp - 3:14; Gabe Klassen (3) - 13:40		Second period		0:18 - Ben Hemmerling (4)
Kyle Chyzowski (6) - pp - 0:42		Third period		No scoring
Carter Sotheran (4) - 15:55		First overtime period		No scoring
Jan Špunar (44 saves / 47 shots)		Goalie stats		Tyler Palmer (46 shots / 50 shots)

April 19	Portland Winterhawks	5–0	Everett Silvertips	Angel of the Winds Arena	Recap
No scoring		First period	No scoring
James Stefan (6) - 5:00; Tyson Jugnauth (4) - 11:28; Ryder Thompson (1) - 15:07		Second period	No scoring
Jack O'Brien (2) - 7:58; Kyle Chyzowski (7) - pp - 15:08		Third period	No scoring
Jan Špunar (27 saves / 27 shots)		Goalie stats	Tyler Palmer (35 saves / 40 shots)

Portland wins series 4–0

== Conference finals ==
=== Eastern Conference ===
==== (E1) Saskatoon Blades vs. (E3) Moose Jaw Warriors ====
April 26	Moose Jaw Warriors	4–3	OT	Saskatoon Blades	SaskTel Centre	Recap
No scoring		First period		3:05 - Charlie Wright (3)
Brayden Schuurman (3) - 2:13; Atley Calvert (4) - 8:04		Second period		1:59 - Egor Sidorov (11)
Matthew Savoie (8) - 15:08		Third period		18:33 - Egor Sidorov (12)
Brayden Yager (8) - 12:34		First overtime period		No scoring
Jackson Unger (28 saves / 31 shots)		Goalie stats		Evan Gardner (22 saves / 26 shots)

April 27	Moose Jaw Warriors	2–3	OT	Saskatoon Blades	SaskTel Centre	Recap
Atley Calvert (5) - 12:33; Kalem Parker (2) - 17:20		First period		No scoring
No scoring		Second period		11:00 - pp - Tanner Molendyk (2); 17:29 - Brandon Lisowsky (5)
No scoring		Third period		No scoring
No scoring		First overtime period		13:06 - Fraser Minten (6)
Jackson Unger (34 saves / 37 shots)		Goalie stats		Evan Gardner (25 saves / 27 shots)

April 30	Saskatoon Blades	1–3	Moose Jaw Warriors	Moose Jaw Events Centre	Recap
Grayden Siepmann (1) - 10:50		First period	No scoring
No scoring		Second period	3:43 - pp - Atley Calvert (6)
No scoring		Third period	7:14 - Martin Ryšavý (4); 18:47 - en - Denton Mateychuk (6)
Evan Gardner (29 saves / 31 shots)		Goalie stats	Jackson Unger (31 saves / 32 shots)

May 1	Saskatoon Blades	5–4	OT	Moose Jaw Warriors	Moose Jaw Events Centre	Recap
Brandon Lisowsky (6) - 0:14; Trevor Wong (4) - 1:07; Alexander Suzdalev (4) - 8:32; Tanner Molendyk (3) - 17:52		First period		12:06 - Brayden Yager (9); 16:54 - Jagger Firkus (10)
No scoring		Second period		1:04 - Brayden Yager (10); 9:57 - Rilen Kovacevic (3)
No scoring		Third period		No scoring
Egor Sidorov (13) - 3:29		First overtime period		No scoring
Evan Gardner (33 saves / 37 shots)		Goalie stats		Jackson Unger (19 saves / 24 shots)

May 3	Moose Jaw Warriors	4–5	OT	Saskatoon Blades	SaskTel Centre	Recap
No scoring		First period		2:56 - Fraser Minten (7); 10:56 - Egor Sidorov (14)
No scoring		Second period		5:06 - pp - Charlie Wright (4); 14:23 - Brandon Lisowsky (7)
Lucas Brenton (1) - 0:49; Jagger Firkus (11) - pp - 4:41; Denton Mateychuk (7) - 7:38; Denton Mateychuk (8) - 13:18		Third period		No scoring
No scoring		First overtime period		18:15 - Fraser Minten (8)
Jackson Unger (13 saves / 17 shots); Dimitri Fortin (24 saves / 25 shots)		Goalie stats		Evan Gardner (39 saves / 43 shots)

May 5	Saskatoon Blades	3–4	OT	Moose Jaw Warriors	Moose Jaw Events Centre	Recap
Egor Sidorov (15) - 3:45		First period		0:38 - Brayden Schuurman (4); 17:58 - Brayden Schuurman (5)
Rowan Calvert (3) - pp - 15:46		Second period		No scoring
Charlie Wright (5) - 3:00		Third period		10:56 - Rilen Kovacevic (4)
No scoring		First overtime period		2:57 - Lynden Lakovic (4)
Evan Gardner (31 saves / 35 shots)		Goalie stats		Jackson Unger (30 saves / 33 shots)

May 7	Moose Jaw Warriors	3–2	OT	Saskatoon Blades	SaskTel Centre	Recap
Ethan Semeniuk (1) - 13:35		First period		No scoring
No scoring		Second period		12:22 - Easton Armstrong (6)
Jagger Firkus (12) - 10:13		Third period		16:53 - Vaughn Watterodt (2)
Lynden Lakovic (5) - 0:36		First overtime period		No scoring
Jackson Unger (37 saves / 39 shots)		Goalie stats		Evan Gardner (22 saves / 25 shots)

Moose Jaw wins series 4–3

=== Western Conference ===
==== (W1) Prince George Cougars vs. (W2) Portland Winterhawks ====
April 26	Portland Winterhawks	0–5	Prince George Cougars	CN Centre	Recap
No scoring		First period	1:43 - Terik Parascak (6)
No scoring		Second period	8:19 - Bauer Dumanski (1); 14:02 - Hudson Thornton (4); 18:14 - Ondřej Becher (4)
No scoring		Third period	15:45 - pp - Koehn Ziemmer (2)
Jan Špunar (30 saves / 35 shots)		Goalie stats	Joshua Ravensbergen (33 saves / 33 shots)

April 27	Portland Winterhawks	5–3	Prince George Cougars	CN Centre	Recap
No scoring		First period	No scoring
Kyle Chyzowski (8) - 11:07; Jack O'Brien (3) - 11:24		Second period	10:40 - pp - Zac Funk (8); 12:27 - Borya Valis (6)
James Stefan (7) - pp - 7:33; Diego Buttazzoni (1) - 14:56; Marcus Nguyen (1) - en - 17:56		Third period	19:53 - Oren Shtrom (3)
Jan Špunar (29 saves / 32 shots)		Goalie stats	Joshua Ravensbergen (33 saves / 37 shots)

April 29	Prince George Cougars	1–4	Portland Winterhawks	Veterans Memorial Coliseum	Recap
No scoring		First period	1:13 - Marcus Nguyen (2); 7:10 - Marcus Nguyen (3); 9:40 - Marek Alscher (2)
No scoring		Second period	No scoring
Borya Valis (7) - pp - 15:56		Third period	1:47 - pp - Marcus Nguyen (4)
Joshua Ravensbergen (7 saves / 10 shots); Ty Young (19 saves / 20 shots)		Goalie stats	Jan Špunar (30 saves / 31 shots)

May 1	Prince George Cougars	2–5	Portland Winterhawks	Veterans Memorial Coliseum	Recap
No scoring		First period	9:20 - pp - Gabe Klassen (4); 15:44 - Diego Buttazzoni (2)
Hudson Thornton (5) - pp - 12:47		Second period	16:48 - Marcus Nguyen (5)
Hudson Thornton (6) - pp - 12:32		Third period	5:38 - Marcus Nguyen (6); 14:53 - Nate Danielson (4)
Ty Young (34 saves / 39 shots)		Goalie stats	Jan Špunar (26 saves / 28 shots)

May 2	Prince George Cougars	6–1	Portland Winterhawks	Veterans Memorial Coliseum	Recap
9:43 - Koehn Ziemmer (3); 18:38 - Koehn Ziemmer (4)		First period	Gabe Klassen (5) - 7:03
11:47 - pp - Hunter Laing (1)		Second period	No scoring
3:22 - Ondřej Becher (5); 11:19 - ps - Borya Valis (8); 13:30 - Keaton Dowhaniuk (4)		Third period	No scoring
Joshua Ravensbergen (25 saves / 26 shots)		Goalie stats	Jan Špunar (31 saves / 37 shots)

May 6	Portland Winterhawks	2–1	2OT	Prince George Cougars	CN Centre	Recap
No scoring		First period		No scoring
No scoring		Second period		Nate Danielson (5) - 19:00
No scoring		Third period		Borya Valis (9) - 5:45
5:40 - Josh Davies (5)		Second overtime period		No scoring
Jan Špunar (48 saves / 49 shots)		Goalie stats		Joshua Ravensbergen (36 saves / 38 shots)

Portland wins series 4–2

== WHL Championship ==
=== (W2) Portland Winterhawks vs. (E3) Moose Jaw Warriors ===
May 10	Moose Jaw Warriors	3–2	Portland Winterhawks	Veterans Memorial Coliseum	Recap
No scoring		First period	No scoring
Atley Calvert (7) - ps - 1:17; Denton Mateychuk (9) - 5:42		Second period	9:00 - Diego Buttazzoni (3)
Matthew Savoie (9) - 16:58		Third period	4:14 - Gabe Klassen (6)
Jackson Unger (31 saves / 33 shots)		Goalie stats	Jan Špunar (34 saves / 37 shots)

May 11	Moose Jaw Warriors	5–1	Portland Winterhawks	Veterans Memorial Coliseum	Recap
Atley Calvert (8) - 5:48		First period	No scoring
Pavel McKenzie (2) - 9:12; Brayden Yager (11) - 18:00		Second period	19:03 - Nate Danielson (6)
Jagger Firkus (13) - 0:15; Jagger Firkus (14) - 5:35		Third period	No scoring
Jackson Unger (37 saves / 38 shots)		Goalie stats	Jan Špunar (22 saves / 27 shots)

May 14	Portland Winterhawks	3–4	OT	Moose Jaw Warriors	Moose Jaw Events Centre	Recap
Tyson Yaremko (2) - 6:41; Nate Danielson (7) - sh - 8:34		First period		4:22 - Lucas Brenton (2)
No scoring		Second period		3:37 - pp - Denton Mateychuk; 17:30 - pp - Denton Mateychuk (11)
Marcus Nguyen (7) - 3:56		Third period		No scoring
No scoring		First overtime period		2:20 - Brayden Schuurman (6)
Jan Špunar (32 saves / 36 shots)		Goalie stats		Jackson Unger (30 saves / 33 shots)

May 15	Portland Winterhawks	2–4	Moose Jaw Warriors	Moose Jaw Events Centre	Recap
No scoring		First period	8:11 - pp - Martin Ryšavý (5)
Kyle Chyzowski (9) - pp - 14:31; Marcus Nguyen (8) - 18:34		Second period	15:37 - Matthew Savoie (10)
No scoring		Third period	14:07 - Brayden Schuurman (7); 17:33 - en - Martin Ryšavý (6)
Jan Špunar (22 saves / 25 shots)		Goalie stats	Jackson Unger (24 saves / 26 shots)

Moose Jaw wins series 4–0

== Playoff scoring leaders ==
Note: GP = Games played; G = Goals; A = Assists; Pts = Points; PIM = Penalty minutes

Player	Team	GP	G	A	Pts	PIM
Jagger Firkus	Moose Jaw Warriors	20	14	18	32	15
Denton Mateychuk	Moose Jaw Warriors	20	11	19	30	2
Brayden Yager	Moose Jaw Warriors	20	11	16	27	12
Matthew Savoie	Moose Jaw Warriors	19	10	14	24	10
Nate Danielson	Portland Winterhawks	18	7	17	24	16
Egor Sidorov	Saskatoon Blades	16	15	8	23	12
Atley Calvert	Moose Jaw Warriors	20	8	12	20	8
Trevor Wong	Saskatoon Blades	16	4	16	20	2
Ondřej Becher	Prince George Cougars	15	5	14	19	14
Riley Heidt	Prince George Cougars	15	3	16	19	18

== Playoff leading goaltenders ==
Note: GP = Games played; Mins = Minutes played; W = Wins; L = Losses; GA = Goals Allowed; SO = Shutouts; SV% = Save percentage; GAA = Goals against average

Player	Team	GP	Mins	W	L	GA	SO	Sv%	GAA
Joshua Ravensbergen	Prince George Cougars	12	694	9	3	23	3	.931	1.99
Evan Gardner	Saskatoon Blades	15	901	10	4	35	1	.910	2.33
Chase Wutzke	Red Deer Rebels	7	461	4	3	19	0	.924	2.48
Ty Young	Prince George Cougars	4	229	1	2	10	0	.917	2.62
Jan Špunar	Portland Winterhawks	18	1120	12	6	49	1	.914	2.63

== WHL awards ==
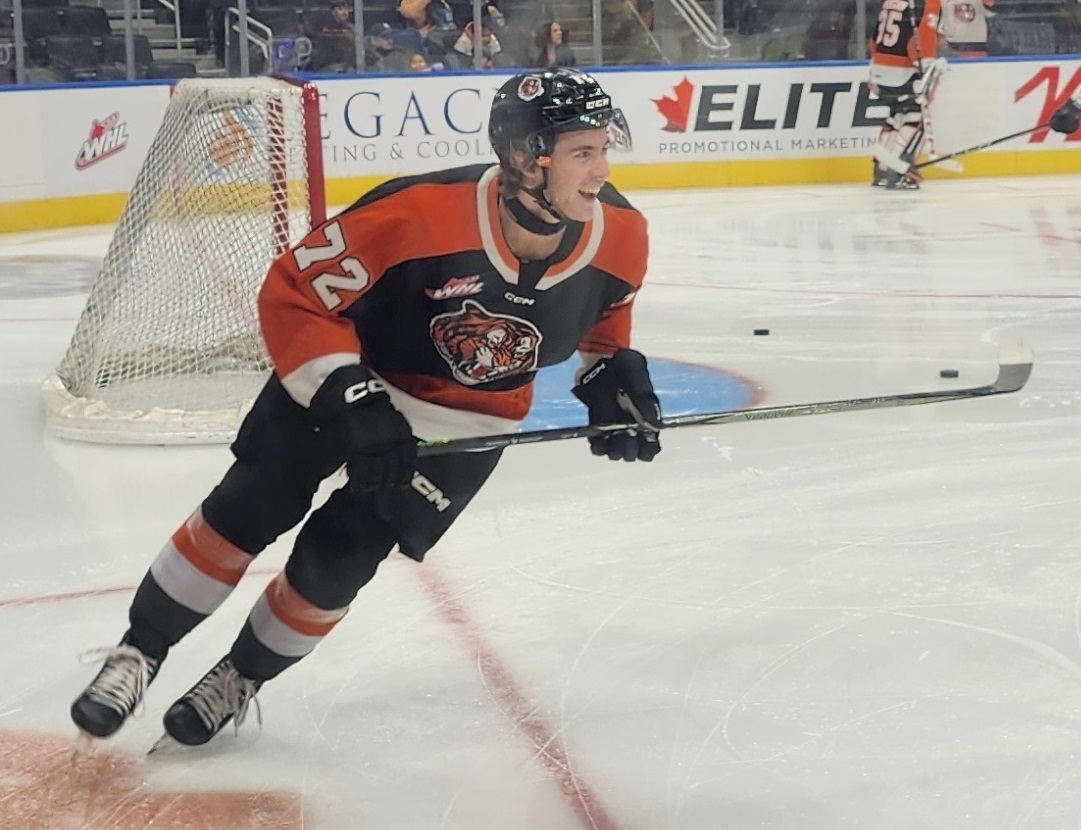
Gavin McKenna was awarded the Jim Piggott Memorial Trophy as the league's rookie of the year

Scotty Munro Memorial Trophy	Regular season champions	Saskatoon Blades
Four Broncos Memorial Trophy	Player of the Year	Jagger Firkus, Moose Jaw Warriors
Bob Clarke Trophy	Top Scorer	Jagger Firkus, Moose Jaw Warriors
Bill Hunter Memorial Trophy	Top Defenceman	Denton Mateychuk, Moose Jaw Warriors
Jim Piggott Memorial Trophy	Rookie of the Year	Gavin McKenna, Medicine Hat Tigers
Del Wilson Trophy	Top Goaltender	Brett Mirwald, Vancouver Giants
WHL Plus-Minus Award	Top Plus-Minus Rating	Zac Funk, Prince George Cougars
Brad Hornung Trophy	Most Sportsmanlike Player	Brayden Yager, Moose Jaw Warriors
Daryl K. (Doc) Seaman Trophy	Scholastic player of the Year	Noah Chadwick, Lethbridge Hurricanes
Jim Donlevy Memorial Trophy	Scholastic team of the Year	Red Deer Rebels
Dunc McCallum Memorial Trophy	Coach of the Year	Mark Lamb, Prince George Cougars
Lloyd Saunders Memorial Trophy	Executive of the Year	Mark Lamb, Prince George Cougars
Allen Paradice Memorial Trophy	Top Official	Jeff Ingram
St. Clair Group Trophy	Marketing/Public Relations Award	Edmonton Oil Kings
Doug Wickenheiser Memorial Trophy	Humanitarian of the Year	Ty Hurley, Kelowna Rockets
WHL Playoff MVP	WHL Finals Most Valuable Player	Denton Mateychuk, Moose Jaw Warriors
Professional Hockey Achievement; Academic Recipient	Alumni Achievement Awards	Connor Ingram

=== All-Star teams ===
==== Central Division ====
First Team		Pos.	Second Team	
Player	Team	Pos.	Player	Team
Harrison Meneghin	Lethbridge Hurricanes	G	Reid Dyck	Swift Current Broncos
Carter Yakemchuk	Calgary Hitmen	D	Noah Chadwick	Lethbridge Hurricanes
Owen Pickering	Swift Current Broncos	D	Marc Lajoie	Edmonton Oil Kings
Conor Geekie	Swift Current Broncos	F	Oliver Tulk	Calgary Hitmen
Gavin McKenna	Medicine Hat Tigers	F	Oazis Wiesblatt	Medicine Hat Tigers
Kai Uchacz	Red Deer Rebels	F	Andrew Basha	Medicine Hat Tigers

==== East Division ====
First Team		Pos.	Second Team	
Player	Team	Pos.	Player	Team
Jackson Unger	Moose Jaw Warriors	G	Carson Bjarnason	Brandon Wheat Kings
Tanner Molendyk	Saskatoon Blades	D	Charlie Wright	Saskatoon Blades
Denton Mateychuk	Moose Jaw Warriors	D	Justice Christensen	Prince Albert Raiders
Trevor Wong	Saskatoon Blades	F	Atley Calvert	Moose Jaw Warriors
Jagger Firkus	Moose Jaw Warriors	F	Sloan Stanick	Prince Albert Raiders
Egor Sidorov	Saskatoon Blades	F	Brayden Yager	Moose Jaw Warriors

==== B.C. Division ====
First Team		Pos.	Second Team	
Player	Team	Pos.	Player	Team
Brett Mirwald	Vancouver Giants	G	Joshua Ravensbergen	Prince George Cougars
Hudson Thornton	Prince George Cougars	D	Caden Price	Kelowna Rockets
Justin Kipkie	Victoria Royals	D	Viliam Kmec	Prince George Cougars
Zac Funk	Prince George Cougars	F	Terik Parascak	Prince George Cougars
Riley Heidt	Prince George Cougars	F	Andrew Cristall	Kelowna Rockets
Tij Iginla	Kelowna Rockets	F	Jaden Lipinski	Kamloops Blazers

==== U.S. Division ====
First Team		Pos.	Second Team	
Player	Team	Pos.	Player	Team
Jan Spunar	Portland Winterhawks	G	Scott Ratzlaff	Seattle Thunderbirds
Graham Sward	Wenatchee Wild	D	Jeremy Hanzel	Seattle Thunderbirds
Luca Cagnoni	Portland Winterhawks	D	Sawyer Mynio	Seattle Thunderbirds
Berkly Catton	Spokane Chiefs	F	James Stefan	Portland Winterhawks
Gabe Klassen	Portland Winterhawks	F	Ben Hemmerling	Everett Silvertips
Kenta Isogai	Wenatchee Wild	F	Conner Roulette	Spokane Chiefs

== Attendance ==
=== Regular season ===
Home team	Home games	Average attendance	Total attendance
Edmonton Oil Kings	34	7,403	251,728
Everett Silvertips	34	6,069	206,358
Spokane Chiefs	34	6,044	205,500
Saskatoon Blades	34	5,165	175,642
Portland Winterhawks	34	4,855	165,098
Seattle Thunderbirds	34	4,653	158,228
Calgary Hitmen	34	4,529	153,994
Kamloops Blazers	34	4,400	149,617
Kelowna Rockets	34	4,355	148,081
Red Deer Rebels	34	4,277	145,439
Tri-City Americans	34	3,998	135,935
Victoria Royals	34	3,824	130,018
Lethbridge Hurricanes	34	3,729	126,786
Vancouver Giants	34	3,672	124,877
Prince George Cougars	34	3,519	119,655
Medicine Hat Tigers	34	3,304	112,346
Regina Pats	34	3,219	109,447
Moose Jaw Warriors	34	3,149	107,092
Wenatchee Wild	34	3,032	103,120
Brandon Wheat Kings	34	2,818	95,814
Prince Albert Raiders	34	2,385	81,116
Swift Current Broncos	34	2,169	73,775
League	748	4,107	3,072,600

=== Playoffs ===
Home team	Home games	Average attendance	Total attendance
Saskatoon Blades	9	9,332	83,988
Portland Winterhawks	9	5,974	53,772
Prince George Cougars	8	5,894	47,152
Medicine Hat Tigers	3	4,653	13,960
Everett Silvertips	5	4,649	23,246
Moose Jaw Warriors	10	4,408	44,083
Red Deer Rebels	4	4,308	17,233
Kelowna Rockets	5	3,829	19,149
Spokane Chiefs	2	3,520	7,040
Lethbridge Hurricanes	2	3,516	7,033
Victoria Royals	2	3,112	6,224
Prince Albert Raiders	2	2,928	5,856
Swift Current Broncos	4	2,890	11,560
Vancouver Giants	2	2,877	5,754
Wenatchee Wild	3	2,344	7,033
Brandon Wheat Kings	2	2,056	4,113
League	72	4,961	357,196

== See also ==
- List of WHL seasons
- 2023–24 OHL season
- 2023–24 QMJHL season

Preceded by 2022–23 WHL season	WHL seasons	Succeeded by 2024–25 WHL season
