= 2024 Memorial Cup =

Canadian junior men's ice hockey championship

Tournament details
- Venue(s): Dow Event Center; Saginaw, Michigan
- Dates: May 24 – June 2, 2024
- Teams: 4
- Host team: Saginaw Spirit (OHL)
- TV partner(s): TSN, RDS, NHL Network, WNEM-TV 5 Plus

Final positions
- Champions: Saginaw Spirit (OHL) (1st title)
- Runners-up: London Knights (OHL)

Tournament statistics
- Scoring leader: Easton Cowan (Knights) (8)

Awards
- MVP: Owen Beck (Spirit)

The Memorial Cup trophy

The 2024 Memorial Cup (branded as the 2024 Memorial Cup presented by Dow for sponsorship reasons) was a four-team round-robin format ice hockey tournament held at Dow Event Center in Saginaw, Michigan, United States. It was the 104th Memorial Cup championship which determined the champion of the Canadian Hockey League (CHL). The tournament was hosted by the Saginaw Spirit, who won the right to host the tournament in March 2023. This was the first time that the Memorial Cup was held in Michigan, and it was the first time in the United States since 1998, which was held in Spokane, Washington. It was also the first time in CHL history that all three championship series from the WHL, OHL, and QMJHL ended in sweeps. The event was played from May 24 to June 2.

== Road to the Cup ==
=== OHL playoffs ===
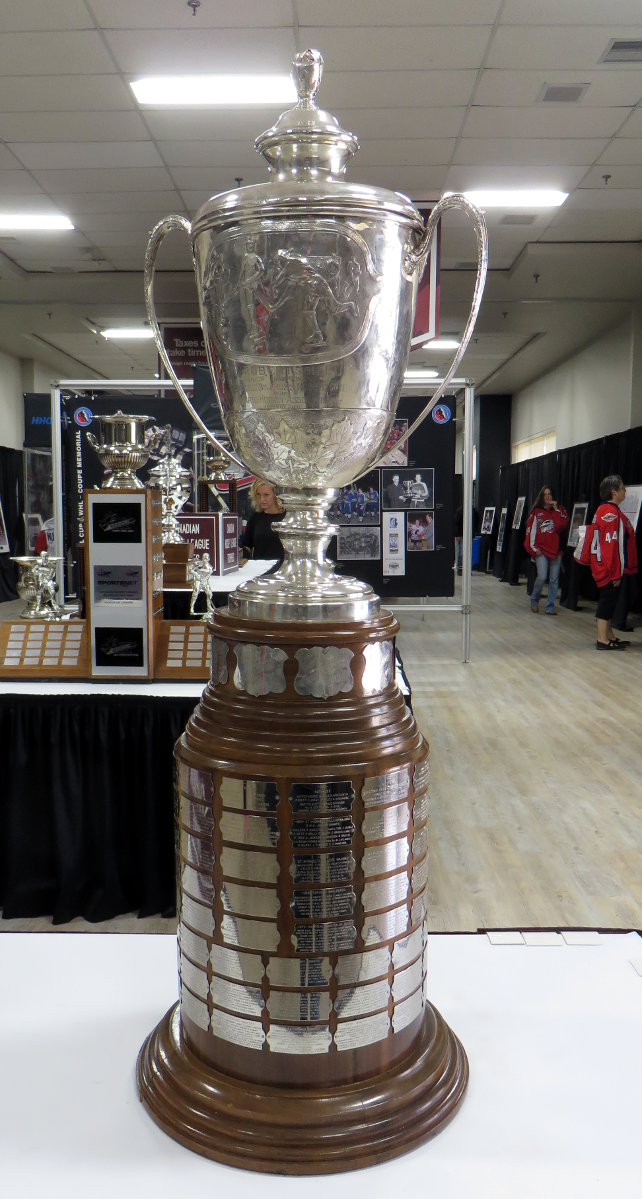
The J. Ross Robertson Cup, championship trophy of the OHL

Conference quarterfinals	Conference semifinals
E1	Oshawa	4
E8	Barrie	2
E1	Oshawa	4
E6	Ottawa	0
E2	North Bay	4
E7	Kingston	1
Eastern
E3	Brantford	2
E6	Ottawa	4
E2	North Bay	4
E5	Sudbury	0
E4	Mississauga	1
E5	Sudbury	4
Note: Pairings are re-seeded after the first round.
W1	London	4
W8	Flint	0
W1	London	4
W4	Kitchener	0
W2	Saginaw	4
W7	Owen Sound	0
Western
W3	S.S Marie	4
W6	Guelph	0
W2	Saginaw	4
W3	S.S Marie	3
W4	Kitchener	4
W5	Erie	2

Conference finals
E1	Oshawa	4
E2	North Bay	3
W1	London	4
W2	Saginaw	2

OHL finals
E1	Oshawa	0
W1	London	4

=== QMJHL playoffs ===
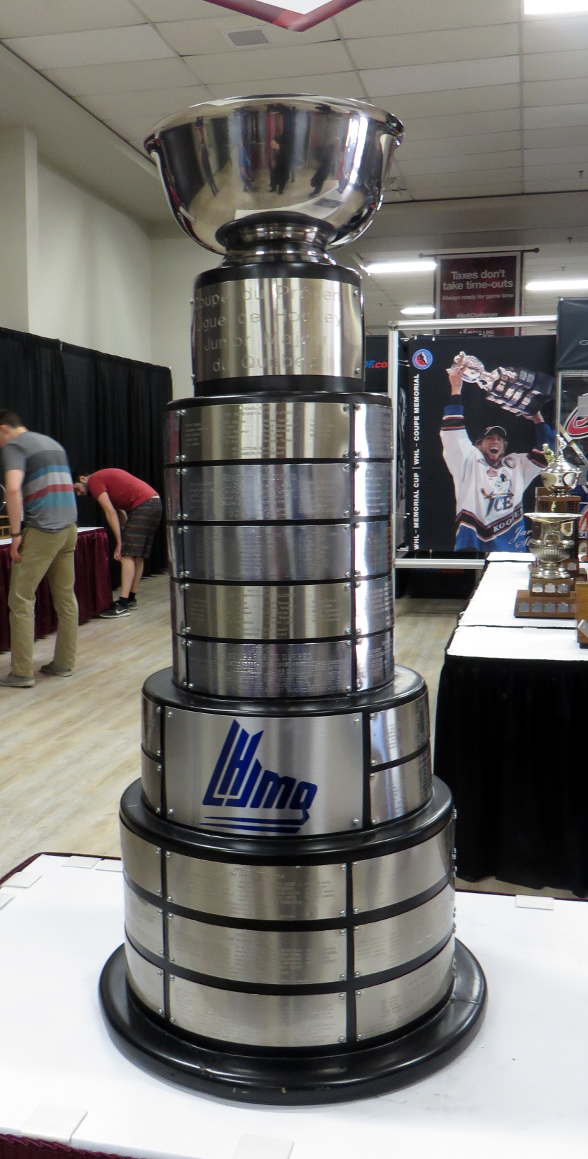
The Gilles-Courteau Trophy, championship trophy of the QMJHL

Note: In the first two rounds seeding is determined by conference standings, and in the two final rounds seeding is determined by overall standings.

Conference quarterfinals
W1	Drummondville	4
W8	Saint John	0
W2	Rouyn-Noranda	4
W7	Gatineau	1
W3	Victoriaville	4
W6	Shawinigan	0
W4	Sherbrooke	4
W5	Blainville-Boisbriand	3
E1	Baie-Comeau	4
E8	Charlottetown	0
E2	Halifax	0
E7	Acadie–Bathurst	4
E3	Moncton	0
E6	Chicoutimi	4
E4	Cape Breton	4
E5	Rimouski	1

Conference semifinals
W1	Drummondville	4
W4	Sherbrooke	2
W2	Rouyn-Noranda	1
W3	Victoriaville	4
E1	Baie-Comeau	4
E7	Acadie–Bathurst	0
E4	Cape Breton	4
E6	Chicoutimi	0

Semifinals
2	Drummondville	4
5	Victoriaville	1
1	Baie-Comeau	4
7	Cape Breton	1

QMJHL finals
1	Baie-Comeau	0
2	Drummondville	4

=== WHL playoffs ===
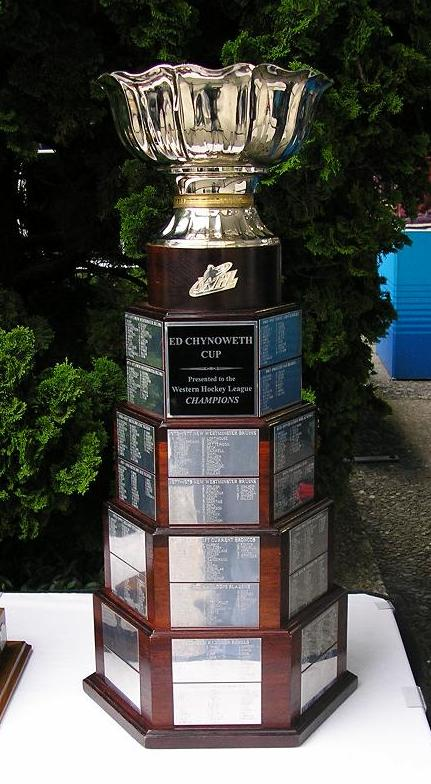
The Ed Chynoweth Cup, championship trophy of the WHL

Conference quarterfinals	Conference semifinals
E1	Saskatoon	4
E8	Prince Albert	1
E1	Saskatoon	4
E5	Red Deer	0
E2	Swift Current	4
E7	Lethbridge	0
Eastern
E3	Moose Jaw	4
E6	Brandon	0
E2	Swift Current	1
E3	Moose Jaw	4
E4	Medicine Hat	1
E5	Red Deer	4
Note: Pairings are re-seeded after the first round.
W1	Prince George	4
W8	Spokane	0
W1	Prince George	4
W5	Kelowna	1
W2	Portland	4
W7	Victoria	0
Western
W3	Everett	4
W6	Vancouver	1
W2	Portland	4
W3	Everett	0
W4	Wenatchee	2
W5	Kelowna	4

Conference finals
E1	Saskatoon	3
E3	Moose Jaw	4
W1	Prince George	2
W2	Portland	4

WHL finals
E3	Moose Jaw	4
W2	Portland	0

== Team rosters ==
=== Saginaw Spirit ===
- Head coach: Chris Lazary

Pos.	No.	Player
G	29	Andrew Oke
G	79	Nolan Lalonde
D	4	Will Bishop
D	6	Braden Haché
D	19	Zayne Parekh
D	73	James Guo
D	75	Jorian Donovan
D	94	Rodwin Dionicio
F	7	Calem Mangone
F	14	Joey Willis
F	15	Sebastien Gervais
F	17	Josh Bloom
F	18	Lincoln Moore
F	24	Matyáš Šapovaliv
F	37	Hunter Haight
F	48	Alex Christopoulos
F	62	Owen Beck
F	68	Ethan Hay
F	77	Michael Misa
F	92	Nic Sima

=== Drummondville Voltigeurs ===
- Head coach: Sylvain Favreau

Pos.	No.	Player
G	35	Louis-Félix Charrois
G	67	Riley Mercer
D	0	Vincent Tremblay
D	3	Simon-Pier Brunet
D	6	Mark-Olivier Beaudry
D	27	Yan Gaudreau
D	58	Mikaël Diotte
D	71	Matteo Rotondi
D	83	Vsevolod Komarov
F	9	Maxime-Olivier Drolet
F	16	Renaud Poulin
F	19	Luke Woodworth
F	20	Peter Repcik
F	24	William Dumont
F	28	Kassim Gaudet
F	37	Lukas Landry
F	42	Noah Reinhart
F	47	Sam Oliver
F	57	Maxime Lafond
F	72	Alexis Gendron
F	79	Ethan Gauthier
F	91	Mikael Huchette
F	92	Justin Côté

=== London Knights ===
- Head coach: Dale Hunter

Pos.	No.	Player
G	31	Michael Simpson
G	80	Owen Willmore
D	2	Henry Brzustewicz
D	3	Sam Dickinson
D	4	Isaiah George
D	24	Noah Jenken
D	27	Alec Leonard
D	51	Jared Woolley
D	59	Oliver Bonk
D	92	Jackson Edward
F	7	Easton Cowan
F	11	Ryder Boulton
F	36	Sawyer Boulton
F	12	Kasper Halttunen
F	13	Jacob Julien
F	14	Evan Van Gorp
F	23	Sam O'Reilly
F	25	Kaleb Lawrence
F	39	Max McCue
F	70	Ruslan Gazizov
F	73	William Nicholl
F	86	Denver Barkey
F	90	Landon Sim

=== Moose Jaw Warriors ===
- Head coach: Mark O'Leary

Pos.	No.	Player
G	30	Jackson Unger
G	33	Dmitri Fortin
D	3	Lucas Brenton
D	5	Denton Mateychuk
D	8	Kalem Parker
D	10	Connor Schmidt
D	12	Cosmo Wilson
D	21	Aiden Ziprick
D	44	Vojtech Port
F	14	Ethan Semeniuk
F	17	Lynden Lakovic
F	18	Brayden Schuurman
F	19	Martin Ryšavý
F	20	Pavel McKenzie
F	22	Ethan Hughes
F	23	Atley Calvert
F	27	Jagger Firkus
F	29	Brayden Yager
F	37	Owen Berge
F	39	Rilen Kovacevic
F	93	Matthew Savoie

== Tournament games ==
All times local (UTC − 5)

=== Round-robin ===
May 24	Moose Jaw Warriors	4–5	Saginaw Spirit	Dow Event Center	Recap
No scoring		First period	19:27 - Nic Sima (1)
Brayden Yager (1) - 18:11; Denton Mateychuk (1) - 18:48; Brayden Yager (2) - 19:46		Second period	2:13 - Owen Beck (1); 7:28 - Zayne Parekh (1); 9:04 - Jorian Donovan (1)
Matthew Savoie (1) - 17:13		Third period	1:52 - Josh Bloom (1)
Jackson Unger (31 saves / 36 shots)		Goalie stats	Andrew Oke (22 saves / 26 shots)

May 25	London Knights	4–0	Drummondville Voltigeurs	Dow Event Center	Recap
8:04 - Ruslan Gazizov (1); 13:53 - Oliver Bonk (1)		First period	No scoring
No scoring		Second period	No scoring
0:20 - Ruslan Gazizov (2); 2:27 - Kasper Halttunen (1)		Third period	No scoring
Michael Simpson (31 saves / 31 shots)		Goalie stats	Riley Mercer (18 saves / 22 shots)

May 26	Saginaw Spirit	4–3	Drummondville Voltigeurs	Dow Event Center	Recap
No scoring		First period	9:00 - Luke Woodworth (1); 17:34 - pp - Peter Repcik (1)
Alex Christopoulos (1) - 12:04; Hunter Haight (1) - 15:45		Second period	19:15 - pp - Justin Côté (1)
Nic Sima (2) - 5:54; Hunter Haight (2) - pp - 12:16		Third period	No scoring
Andrew Oke (21 saves / 24 shots)		Goalie stats	Riley Mercer (27 saves / 31 shots)

May 27	London Knights	5–4	Moose Jaw Warriors	Dow Event Center	Recap
Ruslan Gazizov (3) - 11:58; Sam Dickinson (1) - 17:50		First period	3:39 - Denton Mateychuk (2)
Sam O'Reilly (1) - 9:02; Landon Sim (1) - 12:47; Kasper Halttunen (2) - pp - 16:14		Second period	7:01 - Ethan Semeniuk (1); 16:20 - Ethan Semeniuk (2)
No scoring		Third period	16:05 - Martin Ryšavý (1)
Michael Simpson (26 saves / 30 shots)		Goalie stats	Jackson Unger (23 saves / 28 shots)

May 28	Drummondville Voltigeurs	3–5	Moose Jaw Warriors	Dow Event Center	Recap
No scoring		First period	13:04 - Vojtech Port (1)
Justin Côté (2) - 14:46; Peter Repcik (2) - 15:43		Second period	5:10 - pp - Jagger Firkus (1); 12:43 - Denton Mateychuk (3)
Alexis Gendron (1) - 3:13		Third period	18:26 - sh - Aiden Ziprick (1); 19:50 - en - Brayden Yager (3)
Riley Mercer (23 saves / 27 shots)		Goalie stats	Jackson Unger (49 saves / 52 shots)

May 29	Saginaw Spirit	2–4	London Knights	Dow Event Center	Recap
Alex Christopoulos (2) - 8:50		First period	14:23 - pp - Kasper Halttunen (3)
Joey Willis (1) - 14:20		Second period	10:40 - Denver Barkey (1)
No scoring		Third period	18:35 - Easton Cowan (1); 19:38 - en - Easton Cowan (2)
Andrew Oke (31 saves / 34 shots)		Goalie stats	Michael Simpson (26 saves / 28 shots)

Round-robin standings

Pos	Team	Pld	W	OTW	OTL	L	GF	GA	Pts	
1	London Knights (OHL)	3	3	0	0	0	13	6	6	Advance directly to the championship game
2	Saginaw Spirit (OHL/host)	3	2	0	0	1	11	11	4	Advance to the semifinal game
3	Moose Jaw Warriors (WHL)	3	1	0	0	2	13	13	2	Advance to the semifinal game
4	Drummondville Voltigeurs (QMJHL)	3	0	0	0	3	6	13	0	

Updated to match(es) played on May 29, 2024. Source: CHLMemorialCup.ca

== Playoffs ==
Semifinals; May 31			Championship; June 2
			1	London	3
2	Saginaw	7	2	Saginaw	4
3	Moose Jaw	1

=== Semifinal game ===
May 31	Moose Jaw Warriors	1–7	Saginaw Spirit	Dow Event Center	Recap
Jagger Firkus (2) - 7:08		First period	3:03 - Ethan Hay (1)
No scoring		Second period	1:53 - Braden Haché (1); 3:47 - Owen Beck (2); 9:05 - Lincoln Moore (1); 11:22 - Ethan Hay (2); 14:24 - Sebastien Gervais (1)
No scoring		Third period	1:10 - Rodwin Dionicio (1)
Jackson Unger (30 saves / 37 shots)		Goalie stats	Andrew Oke (23 saves / 24 shots); Nolan Lalonde (1 save / 1 shot)

=== Championship game ===
June 2	Saginaw Spirit	4–3	London Knights	Dow Event Center	Recap
Owen Beck (3) - 9:07; Owen Beck (4) - pp - 19:15		First period	No scoring
Joey Willis (2) - 7:47		Second period	9:45 - Kasper Halttunen (4)
Josh Bloom (2) - 19:38		Third period	7:48 - Easton Cowan (3); 10:16 - Sam Dickinson (2)
Andrew Oke (10 saves / 13 shots)		Goalie stats	Michael Simpson (27 saves / 31 shots)

== Statistical leaders ==
=== Skaters ===
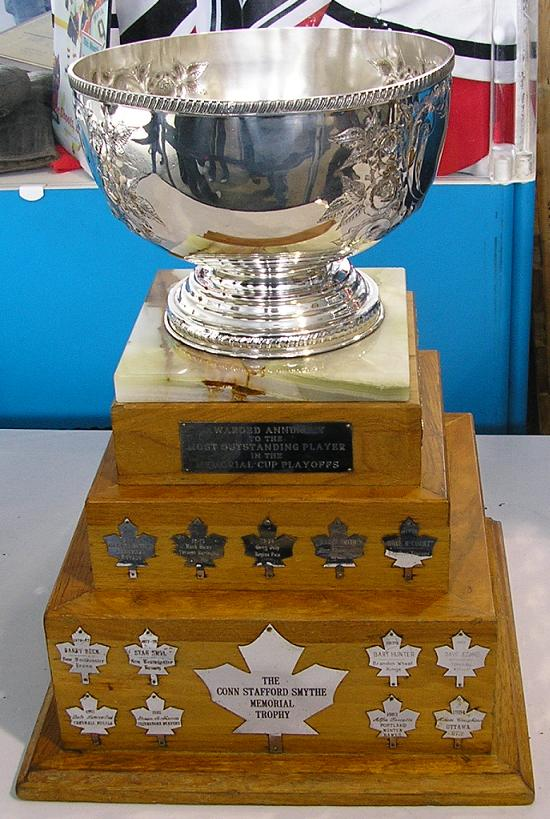
The Stafford Smythe Memorial Trophy, awarded to the most outstanding player in the Memorial Cup playoffs

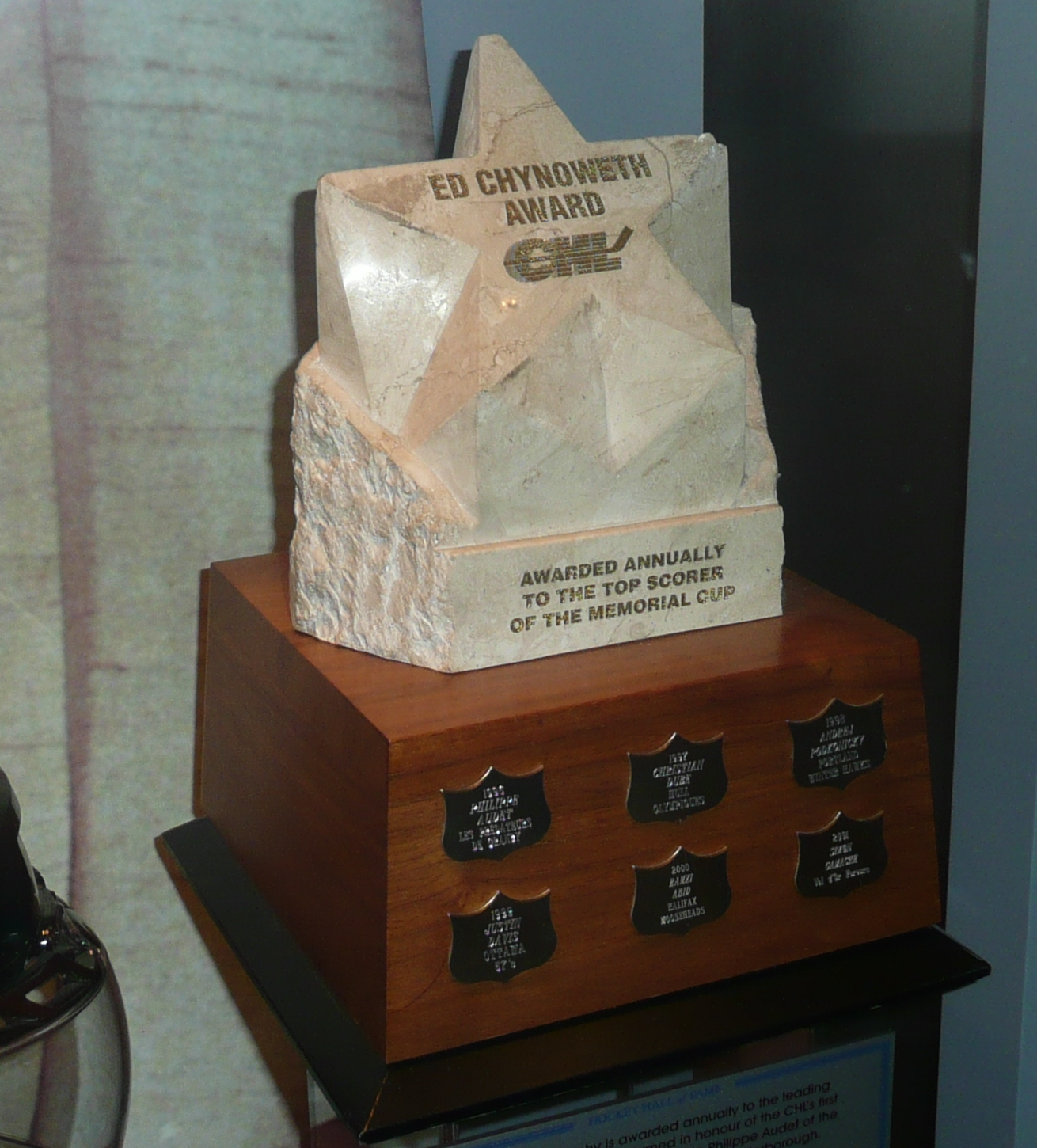
The Ed Chynoweth Trophy, awarded to the top scorer in the Memorial Cup tournament

- GP = Games played; G = Goals; A = Assists; Pts = Points; PIM = Penalty minutes

Player	Team	GP	G	A	Pts	PIM
Easton Cowan	London Knights	4	3	5	8	2
Denton Mateychuk	Moose Jaw Warriors	4	3	4	7	0
Brayden Yager	Moose Jaw Warriors	4	3	3	6	2
Josh Bloom	Saginaw Spirit	5	2	4	6	2
Oliver Bonk	London Knights	4	1	5	6	0
Kasper Halttunen	London Knights	4	4	1	5	2
Owen Beck	Saginaw Spirit	5	4	1	5	0
Rodwin Dionicio	Saginaw Spirit	5	1	4	5	2
Zayne Parekh	Saginaw Spirit	5	1	4	5	6
Michael Misa	Saginaw Spirit	5	0	5	5	0

=== Goaltenders ===
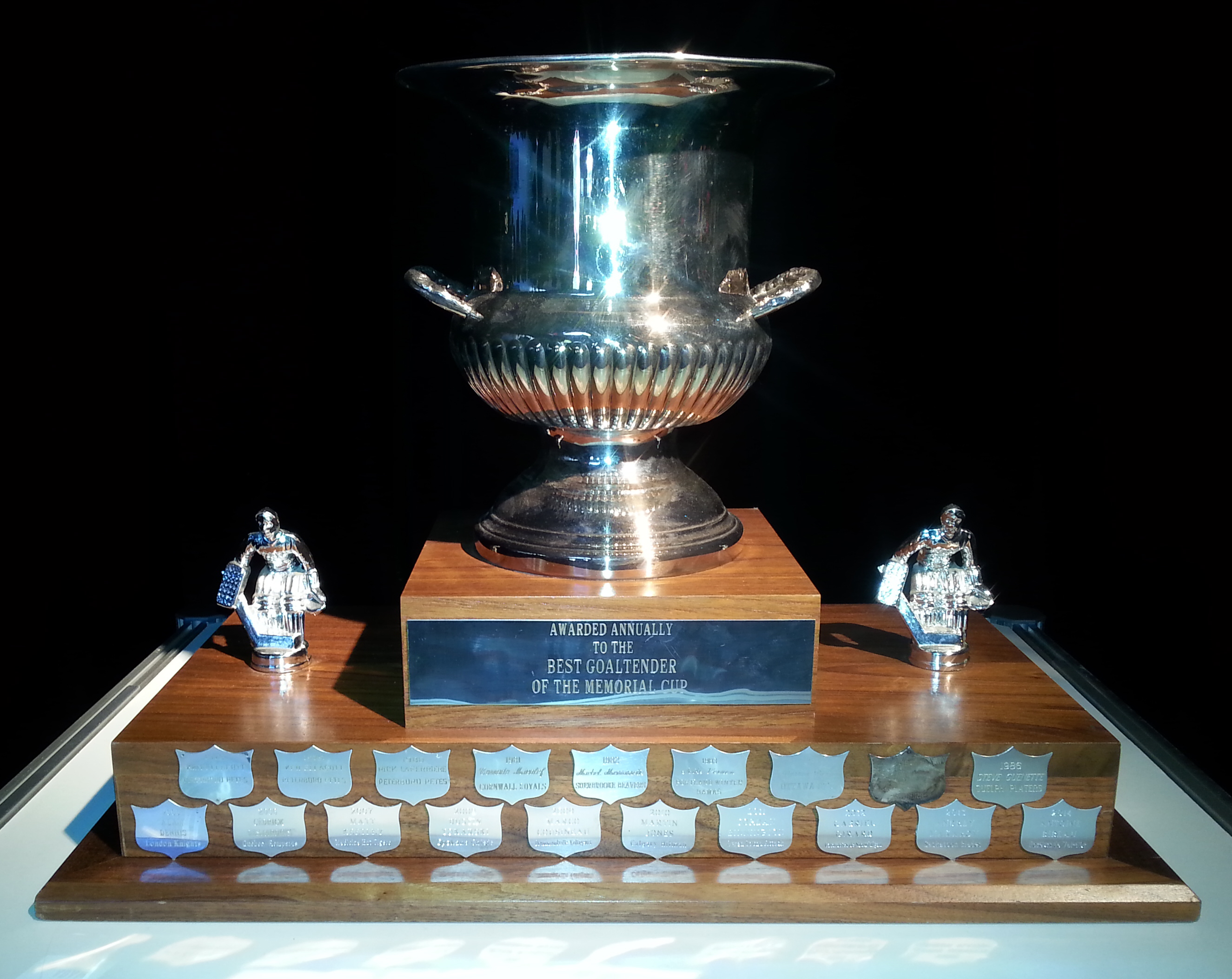
Hap Emms Memorial Trophy, awarded to the best goaltender in the Memorial Cup tournament

- GP = Games played; W = Wins; L = Losses; SA = Shots against; GA = Goals against; GAA = Goals against average; SV% = Save percentage; SO = Shutouts; TOI = Time on ice (minutes)

Player	Team	GP	W	L	OTL	SA	GA	GAA	SV%	SO	TOI
Michael Simpson	London Knights	4	3	1	0	110	10	2.50	.917	1	240
Andrew Oke	Saginaw Spirit	5	4	1	0	121	14	2.82	.884	0	296
Riley Mercer	Drummondville Voltigeurs	3	0	3	0	80	8	4.07	.850	0	177
Jackson Unger	Moose Jaw Warriors	4	1	3	0	153	10	5.09	.869	0	236

== Awards ==
The CHL handed out the following awards at the conclusion of the 2024 Memorial Cup:

2024 Memorial Cup Awards
Award	Recipient(s)
Stafford Smythe Memorial Trophy; Most outstanding player	Owen Beck (Saginaw Spirit)
Ed Chynoweth Trophy; Top scorer	Easton Cowan (London Knights)
George Parsons Trophy; Most sportsmanlike player	Denton Mateychuk (Moose Jaw Warriors)
Hap Emms Memorial Trophy; Best goaltender	Michael Simpson (London Knights)

Memorial Cup All-Star Team
Position	Recipient
Defencemen	Denton Mateychuk (Moose Jaw Warriors)
Defencemen	Rodwin Dionicio (Saginaw Spirit)
Forwards	Owen Beck (Saginaw Spirit)
Forwards	Brayden Yager (Moose Jaw Warriors)
Forwards	Kasper Halttunen (London Knights)
Goaltender	Michael Simpson (London Knights)
