= Matthew Savoie =

Matthew Savoie may refer to:

- Matthew Savoie (figure skater)
- Matthew Savoie (ice hockey)
