= Jagger Firkus =

Canadian ice hockey player (born 2004)

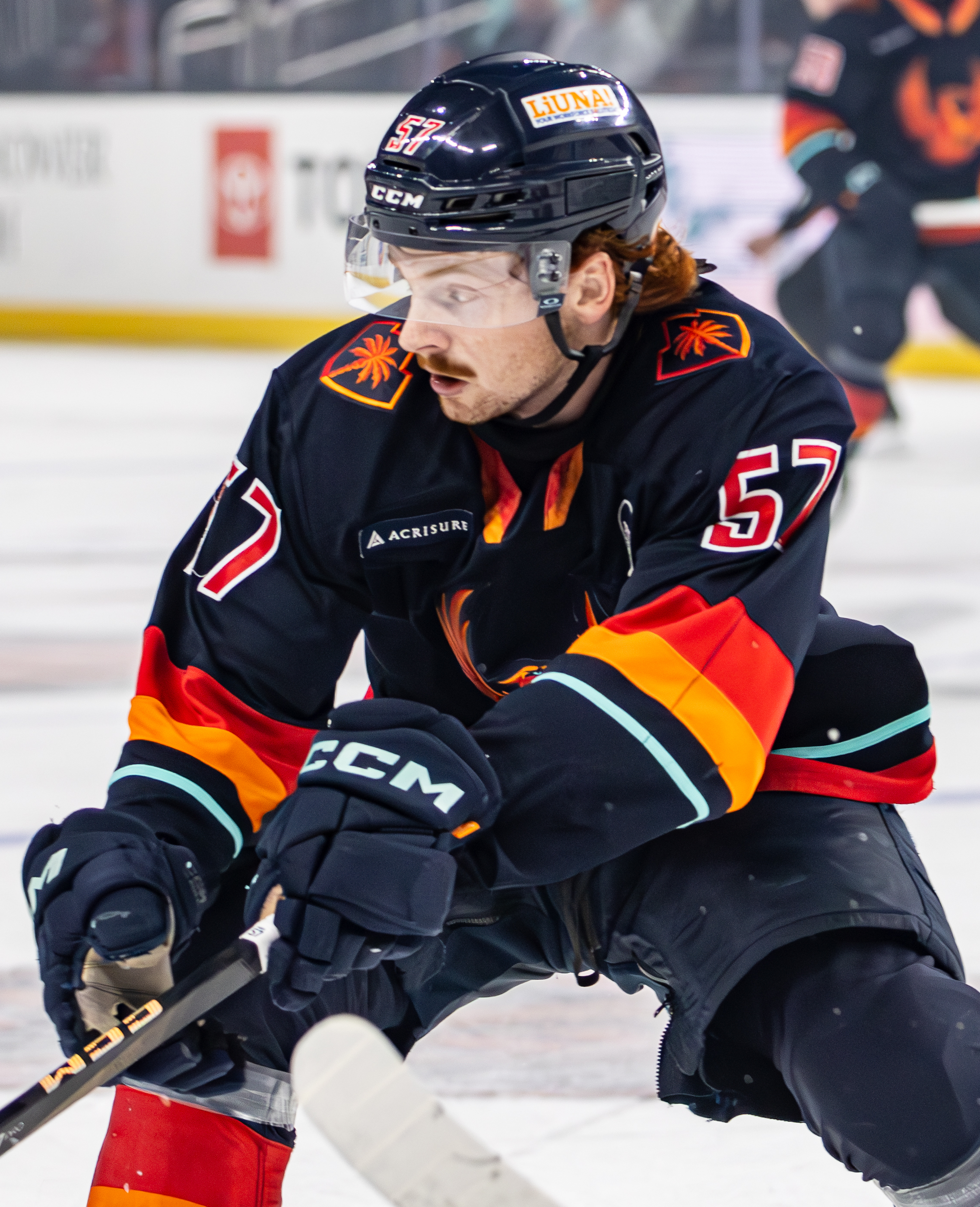
- Firkus with the Coachella Valley Firebirds in 2025
- Born: April 29, 2004 (age 22) Irma, Alberta, Canada
- Height: 5 ft 10 in (178 cm)
- Weight: 153 lb (69 kg; 10 st 13 lb)
- Position: Right wing
- Shoots: Right
- NHL team: Seattle Kraken
- NHL draft: 35th overall, 2022; Seattle Kraken
- Playing career: 2023–present

Jagger Firkus (born April 29, 2004) is a Canadian professional ice hockey player for the Seattle Kraken of the National Hockey League (NHL).

== Playing career ==
=== Junior ===
Firkus played junior hockey for the Lloydminster Bobcats of the Alberta Junior Hockey League from 2017 to 2021. He was selected 82nd overall in the 2019 WHL bantam draft by the Moose Jaw Warriors.

Firkus made his major junior debut with the Warriors in the 2019–20 season season. He collected 36 goals and 44 assists for 80 points during his first full WHL campaign, the 2021–22 season, in which he helped Moose Jaw clinch a spot in the WHL playoffs. His work led Firkus to be considered one of the top prospects going into the 2022 NHL entry draft, in which he would be selected 35th overall by the Seattle Kraken.

During the 2022–23 season, he notched 40 goals and 48 assists for 88 points. On April 12, 2023, Firkus signed an entry-level contract with the Kraken. Firkus made his professional hockey debut with the Coachella Valley Firebirds, the American Hockey League (AHL) affiliate of the Kraken, playing in one playoff game.

Firkus's best play came during the 2023–24 season, during which he recorded 126 points from 61 goals and 65 assists, Firkus went on to capture the Four Broncos Memorial Trophy as player of the year and the Bob Clarke Trophy as the league's top scorer. During the 2024 WHL playoffs, he tallied 14 goals and 18 assists for 32 points. The Warriors went on to defeat the Portland Winterhawks and win the Ed Chynoweth Cup, clinching a spot in the 2024 Memorial Cup. Unfortunately, they would lose 7–1 in the semifinal to the Saginaw Spirit of the Ontario Hockey League. Along with winning the CHL Top Scorer Award, Firkus became the first Moose Jaw Warrior to win the David Branch Player of the Year Award in team history.

=== Professional ===
Prior to the 2024–25 season, Firkus participated in the 2024 NHL Rookie Faceoff. Firkus was called up to the Kraken on November 5, 2026. Firkus made his NHL debut on November 14, 2026 in a game against the Carolina Hurricanes, the second such game taking place in Finland as part of the 2026 NHL Global Series.

== International play ==
Firkus's first chance with Team Canada came at the 2022 Hlinka Gretzky Cup. He was invited to Canada's training camp for the 2024 World Junior Championships. He was cut from the roster, but was later re-called during the tournament, as teammate Matthew Savoie got injured. Savoie missed the last round-robin game, but was able to play in the quarterfinals, leading Firkus to go without playing a single game.

== Career statistics ==
			Regular season					Playoffs
Season	Team	League	GP	G	A	Pts	PIM	GP	G	A	Pts	PIM
2019–20	Moose Jaw Warriors	WHL	12	1	1	2	6	—	—	—	—	—
2020–21	Moose Jaw Warriors	WHL	23	6	8	14	24	—	—	—	—	—
2021–22	Moose Jaw Warriors	WHL	66	36	44	80	34	10	6	6	12	4
2022–23	Moose Jaw Warriors	WHL	66	40	48	88	24	10	10	11	21	10
2022–23	Coachella Valley Firebirds	AHL	—	—	—	—	—	1	0	0	0	0
2023–24	Moose Jaw Warriors	WHL	63	61	65	126	30	20	14	18	32	15
2024–25	Coachella Valley Firebirds	AHL	69	15	21	36	20	6	0	3	3	0
2025–26	Coachella Valley Firebirds	AHL	63	21	35	56	18	12	4	5	9	18
AHL totals			132	36	56	92	38	19	4	8	12	18

== Awards & honours ==
Award	Year
WHL
Ed Chynoweth Cup	2024
Four Broncos Memorial Trophy	2024
Bob Clarke Trophy	2024
CHL
David Branch Player of the Year Award	2024
CHL Top Scorer Award	2024
