= Lakovic =

Lakovic or Lakovič (Serbian Cyrillic: Лаковић) is a gender-neutral Slavic surname that may refer to

- Elvir Laković Laka (born 1969), Bosnian rock singer-songwriter
- Jaka Lakovič (born 1978), Slovenian basketball player and coach
- Lynden Lakovic (born 2006), Canadian ice hockey player
- Predrag Laković (1929–1997), Serbian actor
- Sasha Lakovic (1971–2017), Canadian ice hockey player
