= Marek Alscher =

Czech ice hockey player (born 2004)

- Born: 7 April 2004 (age 22) Kladno, Czech Republic
- Height: 6 ft 3 in (191 cm)
- Weight: 205 lb (93 kg; 14 st 9 lb)
- Position: Defence
- Shoots: Left
- NHL team (P) Cur. team: Florida Panthers; Charlotte Checkers (AHL)
- National team: Czech Republic
- NHL draft: 93rd overall, 2022; Florida Panthers
- Playing career: 2024–present

Marek Alscher (born 7 April 2004) is a Czech professional ice hockey player who is a defenseman for the Charlotte Checkers of the American Hockey League (AHL) as a prospect for the Florida Panthers of the National Hockey League (NHL). He was drafted 93rd overall by the Panthers in the 2022 NHL entry draft.

== Playing career ==
=== Junior ===
Marek Alscher began playing junior hockey in the 2021–22 season for the Portland Winterhawks of the Western Hockey League where he played for 3 seasons. The 2023–24 season was Alscher's last year playing juniors in Portland of WHL.

=== Professional ===
Alscher was selected by the Florida Panthers of the National Hockey League (NHL) in the third round, 93rd overall, of the 2022 NHL entry draft. They signed Alscher to a three-year, entry-level contract on 13 March 2023. He spent the 2024–25 season playing in 53 regular-season games and 17 playoff games for the Florida Panthers' American Hockey League affiliate, the Charlotte Checkers. On 9 April 2026, Alscher made his NHL debut for the Florida Panthers in 5–1 loss against the Ottawa Senators. He earned his first NHL point in only his second NHL game on 11 April, assisting on the game-winning goal by Tomáš Nosek in a 6–2 win over the Toronto Maple Leafs.

== International play ==
Medal record

Men's ice hockey

Representing the Czech Republic

World Junior Championships
Bronze medal – third place	2024 Sweden	

Alscher represented the Czech Republic at the 2024 World Junior Ice Hockey Championships which was his first World Juniors appearance and won a bronze medal.

== Career statistics ==
			Regular season					Playoffs
Season	Team	League	GP	G	A	Pts	PIM	GP	G	A	Pts	PIM
2021–22	Portland Winterhawks	WHL	61	7	9	16	48	11	0	0	0	17
2022–23	Portland Winterhawks	WHL	60	8	16	24	67	9	0	4	4	2
2023–24	Portland Winterhawks	WHL	57	7	19	26	43	18	2	3	5	8
2024–25	Charlotte Checkers	AHL	53	2	8	10	36	17	0	2	2	6
2025–26	Charlotte Checkers	AHL	52	3	8	11	32	1	1	0	1	0
2025–26	Florida Panthers	NHL	4	0	3	3	0	—	—	—	—	—
NHL totals			4	0	3	3	0	—	—	—	—	—

=== International ===
Year	Team	Event	Result	GP	G	A	Pts	PIM
2024	Czech Republic	WJC	3rd place, bronze medalist(s)	7	0	0	0	6
2026	Czech Republic	WC	5th	8	2	0	2	2
Junior totals				7	0	0	0	6
Senior totals				8	2	0	2	2
