= Denton Mateychuk =

Canadian ice hockey player (born 2004)

- Born: July 12, 2004 (age 22) Dominion City, Manitoba, Canada
- Height: 5 ft 11 in (180 cm)
- Weight: 188 lb (85 kg; 13 st 6 lb)
- Position: Defence
- Shoots: Left
- NHL team: Columbus Blue Jackets
- National team: Canada
- NHL draft: 12th overall, 2022; Columbus Blue Jackets
- Playing career: 2024–present

Denton Mateychuk (born July 12, 2004) is a Canadian professional ice hockey player who is a defenceman for the Columbus Blue Jackets of the National Hockey League (NHL). He was drafted twelfth overall by the Blue Jackets in the 2022 NHL entry draft.

== Playing career ==
Following his selection at the draft, Mateychuk was signed to a three-year, entry-level contract with the Columbus Blue Jackets on July 13, 2022.

During the 2023–24 season, his final year in the WHL with the Moose Jaw Warriors, Mateychuk had 17 goals and 58 assists in 52 games, leading all league defencemen in points per game. He received the Bill Hunter Memorial Trophy as the WHL's choice for best defenceman, and was later named to the Canadian Hockey League's First All-Star Team. In the postseason, he led the Warriors on a deep run to the WHL Finals, where they swept the Portland Winterhawks to claim the Ed Chynoweth Cup. Mateychuk had 11 goals and 19 assists in 20 playoff games, and was named WHL Playoff MVP. As WHL champions, the Warriors then played at the 2024 Memorial Cup. Mateychuk was given the George Parsons Trophy as the tournament's most sportmanslike player, and was named to the Memorial Cup All-Star Team. Following the Memorial Cup, he was called up to make his professional debut with the Cleveland Monsters in the AHL Calder Cup playoffs, playing games in the Eastern Conference Final against the Hershey Bears.

Mateychuk began the 2024–25 season with the Monsters, appearing in 27 games, and in that span registering 9 goals and 16 assists. He was called up to make his NHL debut on December 23, 2024, thereafter appearing in 45 of the Blue Jackets' final 48 games of the NHL season and logging the second-most icetime for rookie defencemen over that span. He recorded his first assist on December 31 against the Carolina Hurricanes, and scored his first goal on January 9 against the Seattle Kraken. Following the team's failure to qualify for the 2025 Stanley Cup playoffs, Columbus returned him to the Monsters for the Calder Cup playoffs. After his first full professional season, Mateychuk was named to the NHL All-Rookie Team.

== Personal life ==
Mateychuk and Owen Pickering are second cousins and were both selected in the first round of the 2022 NHL entry draft.

== Career statistics ==
=== Regular season and playoffs ===
			Regular season					Playoffs
Season	Team	League	GP	G	A	Pts	PIM	GP	G	A	Pts	PIM
2019–20	Eastman Selects	MU18HL	30	13	17	30	0	6	1	2	3	2
2019–20	Moose Jaw Warriors	WHL	7	1	1	2	0	—	—	—	—	—
2020–21	Steinbach Pistons	MJHL	8	1	2	3	4	—	—	—	—	—
2020–21	Moose Jaw Warriors	WHL	16	2	7	9	8	—	—	—	—	—
2021–22	Moose Jaw Warriors	WHL	65	13	51	64	15	10	1	9	10	2
2022–23	Moose Jaw Warriors	WHL	63	8	57	65	28	10	3	5	8	0
2023–24	Moose Jaw Warriors	WHL	52	17	58	75	31	20	11	19	30	2
2023–24	Cleveland Monsters	AHL	—	—	—	—	—	4	0	3	3	0
2024–25	Cleveland Monsters	AHL	27	9	16	25	10	5	3	2	5	4
2024–25	Columbus Blue Jackets	NHL	45	4	9	13	20	—	—	—	—	—
2025–26	Columbus Blue Jackets	NHL	75	13	18	31	8	—	—	—	—	—
NHL totals			120	17	27	44	28	—	—	—	—	—

=== International ===
Year	Team	Event	Result	GP	G	A	Pts	PIM
2021	Canada	U18	1st place, gold medalist(s)	3	0	0	0	0
2024	Canada	WJC	5th	5	0	4	4	0
2026	Canada	WC	8th	10	2	3	5	4
Junior totals				8	0	4	4	0
Senior totals				10	2	3	5	4

== Awards and honours ==
Award	Year	Ref
CHL
First All-Star Team	2024	
George Parsons Trophy	2024	
Memorial Cup All-Star Team	2024	
WHL
Bill Hunter Memorial Trophy	2024	
Ed Chynoweth Cup champion	2024	
WHL Playoff MVP	2024	
NHL
All-Rookie Team	2025	

Awards and achievements
Preceded by David Jiříček	Columbus Blue Jackets first-round draft pick 2022	Succeeded by Adam Fantilli
