= Owen Pickering =

Canadian ice hockey player (born 2004)

- Born: January 27, 2004 (age 22) St. Adolphe, Manitoba, Canada
- Height: 6 ft 5 in (196 cm)
- Weight: 206 lb (93 kg; 14 st 10 lb)
- Position: Defence
- Shoots: Left
- NHL team (P) Cur. team: Pittsburgh Penguins; WBS Penguins (AHL)
- NHL draft: 21st overall, 2022; Pittsburgh Penguins
- Playing career: 2023–present

Owen Pickering (born January 27, 2004) is a Canadian professional ice hockey player who is a defenceman for the Wilkes-Barre/Scranton Penguins of the American Hockey League (AHL) while under contract to the Pittsburgh Penguins of the National Hockey League (NHL). Pickering was drafted in the first round, 21st overall, by the Penguins in the 2022 NHL entry draft.

== Playing career ==
The Swift Current Broncos of the Western Hockey League selected Pickering in the ninth round, 177th overall, in the 2019 WHL Bantam Draft.

On July 16, 2022, Pickering was signed to a three-year, entry-level contract by the Pittsburgh Penguins. On October 14, 2022, he was named captain of the Broncos. Pickering was named to the WHL Central Division All-Star First Team for the 2022–23 WHL season. On March 30, 2023, Pittsburgh reassigned Pickering to their AHL affiliate, the Wilkes-Barre/Scranton Penguins. He made his AHL debut on March 31, 2023, in a 4–2 loss to the Lehigh Valley Phantoms.

On October 10, 2023, Pickering was returned to the Broncos for the 2023–24 WHL season. Pickering was again named to the WHL Central Division All-Star First Team in 2023–24.

On November 16, 2024, with Ryan Graves out as a healthy scratch, Pickering was called up to make his NHL debut during the 2024–25 season against the San Jose Sharks. Playing on the third defensive pairing, Pickering recorded an assist on Jesse Puljujärvi's goal for his first NHL point. Pickering scored his first career NHL goal on December 3, in a 5–4 overtime victory against the Florida Panthers. He played a total of 25 games with Pittsburgh before being assigned back to Wilkes-Barre/Scranton on January 15, 2025. Pickering finished the 2024–25 AHL season with Wilkes-Barre/Scranton, totaling 13 points (2 goals, 11 assists) in 47 games. The Penguins were eliminated 2–0 from the first round of the 2025 Calder Cup playoffs by the Lehigh Valley Phantoms in a best-of-three series. Pickering played both games in the series, but did not tally any points.

== International play ==
Pickering represented the Canada under-18 team at the 2022 IIHF World U18 Championships.

== Personal life ==
Alongside hockey, Pickering played baseball, volleyball, and basketball, growing up. He started playing the violin when he was six.

Prior to being drafted, his favourite NHL team was the Winnipeg Jets and he named Miro Heiskanen as his favourite NHL player.

Pickering and Denton Mateychuk are second cousins, and were both selected in the first round of the 2022 NHL entry draft. His younger sister, Avery, has represented Canada at the IIHF World Women's U18 Championship.

== Career statistics ==
=== Regular season and playoffs ===
			Regular season					Playoffs
Season	Team	League	GP	G	A	Pts	PIM	GP	G	A	Pts	PIM
2020–21	Swift Current Broncos	WHL	23	2	7	9	8	—	—	—	—	—
2021–22	Swift Current Broncos	WHL	62	9	24	33	39	—	—	—	—	—
2022–23	Swift Current Broncos	WHL	61	9	36	45	30	—	—	—	—	—
2022–23	Wilkes-Barre/Scranton Penguins	AHL	8	0	0	0	0	—	—	—	—	—
2023–24	Swift Current Broncos	WHL	59	7	39	46	35	9	1	6	7	0
2024–25	Wilkes-Barre/Scranton Penguins	AHL	47	2	11	13	10	2	0	0	0	2
2024–25	Pittsburgh Penguins	NHL	25	1	2	3	6	—	—	—	—	—
2025–26	Wilkes-Barre/Scranton Penguins	AHL	68	7	21	28	28	11	1	3	4	0
2025–26	Pittsburgh Penguins	NHL	4	0	0	0	2	—	—	—	—	—
NHL totals			29	1	2	3	8	—	—	—	—	—

=== International ===
Year	Team	Event	Result	GP	G	A	Pts	PIM
2022	Canada	U18	5th	4	0	2	2	0
Junior totals				4	0	2	2	0

== Awards and honours ==
Award	Year	Ref
WHL		
Central Division First All-Star Team	2023	
Central Division First All-Star Team	2024	

Awards and achievements
Preceded by Sam Poulin	Pittsburgh Penguins first-round draft pick 2022	Succeeded by Brayden Yager
