= Brayden Yager =

Canadian ice hockey player (born 2005)

- Born: January 3, 2005 (age 21) Prince Albert, Saskatchewan, Canada
- Height: 6 ft 0 in (183 cm)
- Weight: 170 lb (77 kg; 12 st 2 lb)
- Position: Centre
- Shoots: Right
- NHL team: Winnipeg Jets
- NHL draft: 14th overall, 2023; Pittsburgh Penguins
- Playing career: 2025–present

Brayden Trevor Yager (born January 3, 2005) is a Canadian professional ice hockey player for the Winnipeg Jets of the National Hockey League (NHL). He was selected in the first round, 14th overall, by the Pittsburgh Penguins in the 2023 NHL entry draft.

== Playing career ==
=== Early years ===
Growing up in Saskatchewan, Yager played bantam hockey with the Martensville Marauders in the Saskatchewan Male U15 League from 2017 to 2019. In his first season with the team, he recorded 35 goals and 24 assists for 59 points through 31 games. He improved during the 2018–19 season by accumulating 44 goals and 59 assists for 103 points through 31 games. Following this, Yager played two seasons with the Saskatoon Contacts in the Saskatchewan Midget 'AAA' Hockey League (SMAAAHL) as an underage player. Due to his age, he was required to receive "exceptional player" status to play at 14. In the 2019–20 season, during which he turned 15, he finished third in team scoring with 18 goals and 24 assists for 42 points through 44 games. He continued to impress during that year's playoffs, as he led the Contacts in scoring with two goals and six assists for and eight points through six games.

=== Junior ===
During the COVID-19 pandemic, Yager was drafted third overall in the 2020 Western Hockey League (WHL) Bantam Draft by the Moose Jaw Warriors. Due to the foregoing pandemic, Yager was able to make his major junior debut at the age of 15 without gaining "exceptional player" status. This was because the pandemic restricted the options available to players during the winter and spring. In his rookie season, Yager set a new franchise record for 16-year olds by tallying 34 goals through 63 regular season games during the 2021–22 season. As a result of his exceptional play, Yager became the first Moose Jaw player to receive the Canadian Hockey League (CHL)'s Rookie of the Year award. Yager also received the Jim Piggott Memorial Trophy as Rookie of the Year across the WHL.

Yager returned to the Warriors for the 2022–23 season where he was named an alternate captain. In this new role, he recorded career highs in points and assists with 78 and 50 respectively. He ranked second on the team in points and 22nd among all WHL players. Yager's production helped the Warriors finish fourth in the Eastern Conference with a 37–24–4–3 record. At the conclusion of the season, Yager received the Brad Hornung Memorial Trophy as the league's Most Sportsmanlike Player. Ahead of the 2023 NHL entry draft, Yager was ranked fourth among all skaters by The Sports Network's Director of Scouting Craig Button. He was eventually selected in the first round, 14th overall, by the Pittsburgh Penguins.

In the 2023–24 season, Yager played 57 games, managing 35 goals and 60 assists while accruing only 20 penalty minutes. He earned the Hornung Trophy for the second consecutive season, and was ultimately named CHL Sportsman of the Year. Yager played a key role in the Warriors' deep run in the 2024 playoffs, which saw them defeat the Portland Winterhawks in the WHL Finals to hoist the Ed Chynoweth Cup. He had 11 goals and 16 assists in the postseason, third in team scoring. As WHL champions, the Warriors went on to participate in the 2024 Memorial Cup. They were ultimately eliminated by the host Saginaw Spirit in the tournament semi-final. Yager had three goals and three assists in four games played. He was named to the Memorial Cup All-Star Team for the tournament.

On July 25, 2024, Yager signed his first professional contract with the Pittsburgh Penguins, signing a three-year, entry-level deal. On August 22, 2024, Yager was traded by the Penguins to the Winnipeg Jets in exchange for the signing rights to prospect Rutger McGroarty.

Yager was traded to the Lethbridge Hurricanes on December 2, 2024 alongside teammate Jackson Unger in exchange for three players and a series of draft picks.

=== Professional ===
On 8 November 2026, Yager scored his first NHL goal during a game against the Tampa Bay Lightning during a power play in the third period.

== Personal life ==
Yager was born on January 3, 2005, to parents Cam and Maureen in Saskatchewan, Canada. Although he was raised in Prince Albert, Saskatchewan, the family moved to Saskatoon when he was 11 years old. Yager was born into an athletic family as both his father and older brother played ice hockey. His father was a goaltender for the Detroit Falcons in the Colonial Hockey League while his brother played in the Saskatchewan Male U18 AAA Hockey League (SMAAAHL).

== International play ==
Medal record

Representing Canada

Ice hockey

Hlinka Gretzky Cup
Gold medal – first place	2022 Canada	

As a native of Canada, Yager represented the Canadian men's junior national team at the 2022 Hlinka Gretzky Cup. During the tournament, he recorded five goals and four assists through five games to help Team Canada win a gold medal.

== Career statistics ==
=== Regular season and playoffs ===
			Regular season					Playoffs
Season	Team	League	GP	G	A	Pts	PIM	GP	G	A	Pts	PIM
2020–21	Moose Jaw Warriors	WHL	24	7	11	18	4	—	—	—	—	—
2021–22	Moose Jaw Warriors	WHL	63	34	25	59	18	10	3	4	7	8
2022–23	Moose Jaw Warriors	WHL	67	28	50	78	14	10	6	10	16	2
2023–24	Moose Jaw Warriors	WHL	57	35	60	95	20	20	11	16	27	12
2024–25	Moose Jaw Warriors	WHL	21	11	19	30	4	—	—	—	—	—
2024–25	Lethbridge Hurricanes	WHL	33	14	38	52	18	16	8	6	14	2
2025–26	Manitoba Moose	AHL	69	10	20	30	10	7	0	4	4	0
2025–26	Winnipeg Jets	NHL	3	0	0	0	2	—	—	—	—	—
NHL totals			3	0	0	0	2	—	—	—	—	—

=== International ===
Year	Team	Event	Result	GP	G	A	Pts	PIM
2022	Canada	HG18	1st place, gold medalist(s)	5	5	4	9	0
2024	Canada	WJC	5th	5	2	3	5	2
2025	Canada	WJC	5th	5	0	3	3	0
Junior totals				15	7	10	17	2

== Awards and honours ==
Award	Year
CHL
CHL Rookie of the Year	2022
CHL Sportsman of the Year	2024
Memorial Cup All-Star Team	2024
WHL
Jim Piggott Memorial Trophy	2022
Brad Hornung Trophy	2023, 2024
Ed Chynoweth Cup champion	2024

Awards and achievements
Preceded by Owen Pickering	Pittsburgh Penguins first-round draft pick 2023	Succeeded by Benjamin Kindel
