= Terik Parascak =

Canadian ice hockey player (born 2006)

- Born: May 28, 2006 (age 20) Lethbridge, Alberta, Canada
- Height: 6 ft 1 in (185 cm)
- Weight: 187 lb (85 kg; 13 st 5 lb)
- Position: Right wing
- Shoots: Right
- NHL team (P) Cur. team: Washington Capitals; Hershey Bears (AHL)
- NHL draft: 17th overall, 2024; Washington Capitals
- Playing career: 2025–present

Terik Parascak (born May 28, 2006) is a Canadian professional ice hockey right winger for the Hershey Bears of the American Hockey League (AHL) as a prospect to the Washington Capitals of the National Hockey League (NHL). He was drafted 17th overall by the Capitals in the 2024 NHL entry draft.

== Playing career ==
Parascak attended and played for the Edge School before joining the Prince George Cougars of the Western Hockey League (WHL) during the 2022–23 WHL season, playing in five regular season games. The following season, Parascak scored 105 points, the eighth-highest total in the league. He was the runner-up for the WHL Rookie of the Year award and was named to the CHL All-Rookie Team. He was drafted 17th overall, in the first round of the 2024 NHL entry draft by the Washington Capitals. He signed an entry-level contract with the team on July 5, 2024.

== Career statistics ==
			Regular season					Playoffs
Season	Team	League	GP	G	A	Pts	PIM	GP	G	A	Pts	PIM
2022–23	Prince George Cougars	WHL	4	0	0	0	0	1	0	0	0	0
2023–24	Prince George Cougars	WHL	68	43	62	105	41	12	6	8	14	10
2024–25	Prince George Cougars	WHL	59	28	54	82	47	7	4	6	10	4
2024–25	Hershey Bears	AHL	1	0	0	0	0	—	—	—	—	—
2025–26	Prince George Cougars	WHL	61	33	46	79	53	12	7	10	17	4
WHL totals			192	104	162	266	141	32	17	24	41	18

Awards and achievements
Preceded by Ryan Leonard	Washington Capitals first-round draft pick 2024	Succeeded by Lynden Lakovic
