= Josh Filmon =

Canadian ice hockey player (born 2004)

- Born: March 18, 2004 (age 22) Winnipeg, Manitoba, Canada
- Height: 6 ft 3 in (191 cm)
- Weight: 170 lb (77 kg; 12 st 2 lb)
- Position: Left wing
- Shoots: Left
- NHL team (P) Cur. team: New Jersey Devils; Utica Comets (AHL)
- NHL draft: 166th overall, 2022; New Jersey Devils
- Playing career: 2023–present

Josh Filmon (born March 18, 2004) is a Canadian professional ice hockey player who is a forward for the Utica Comets of the American Hockey League (AHL) as a prospect to the New Jersey Devils of the National Hockey League (NHL). He was selected by the Devils 166th overall, in the sixth round of the 2022 NHL entry draft.

== Playing career ==
Filmon was selected 67th overall, in the fourth round of the 2019 Western Hockey League (WHL) bantam draft by the Swift Current Broncos, with whom he signed a standard player contract on May 4, 2020. He scored his first WHL goal against the Saskatoon Blades on March 24, 2021. He finished the 2020–21 season, his first at the major junior level, with two goals in 17 games.

The 2021–22 season saw Filmon improve his production drastically, to 23 goals and 45 points in 67 games, the third best point total on the team. He scored his first hat-trick in the WHL on December 27, 2021, against the Lethbridge Hurricanes. He was selected as one of 40 draft-eligible major junior players to play at the 2022 CHL/NHL Top Prospects Game, which took place on March 26, 2022. Following the season, his efforts would see him drafted 166th overall, in the sixth round of the 2022 NHL entry draft by the New Jersey Devils.

On December 16, 2022, Filmon became the first WHL player since Tyler Ennis in 2009 to score six goals in a game, reaching the total in under two periods and adding an assist for a seven-point night against the Edmonton Oil Kings. He nearly scored a seventh goal on a breakaway in the third period, which would have tied the WHL record for most goals in a game. Filmon was named WHL player of the week for the week ending on December 18, 2022, scoring one goal in addition to his seven-point game.

At the conclusion of the 2022–23 season, Filmon's 75 points in 64 games were the best on the Broncos, his 47 goals led the team by a 21-goal margin, and he was named to the WHL's first all-star team for the year. With the Broncos failing to make the playoffs, Filmon signed a three-year entry-level contract with the Devils, and joined their American Hockey League (AHL) affiliate, the Utica Comets, on an amateur try-out, making his professional debut on April 4, 2023. He scored his first AHL goal on April 8, 2023, against the Rochester Americans.

After one preseason game with the Devils, Filmon was assigned back to Swift Current for the 2023–24 season. His production decreased from the previous year, to 27 goals and 67 points in 64 games. In the playoffs, Filmon's seven goals led the Broncos, who were eliminated in the second round by the Moose Jaw Warriors.

== International play ==
Filmon represented Canada at the 2022 IIHF World U18 Championships, where he posted one assist in three games.

== Career statistics ==
=== Regular season and playoffs ===
			Regular season					Playoffs
Season	Team	League	GP	G	A	Pts	PIM	GP	G	A	Pts	PIM
2020–21	Swift Current Broncos	WHL	17	2	0	2	2	—	—	—	—	—
2021–22	Swift Current Broncos	WHL	67	23	22	45	26	—	—	—	—	—
2022–23	Swift Current Broncos	WHL	64	47	28	75	38	—	—	—	—	—
2022–23	Utica Comets	AHL	4	1	0	1	2	—	—	—	—	—
2023–24	Swift Current Broncos	WHL	64	27	40	67	30	9	7	2	9	2
2024–25	Utica Comets	AHL	12	0	0	0	2	—	—	—	—	—
2024–25	Adirondack Thunder	ECHL	65	20	16	36	18	—	—	—	—	—
2025–26	Utica Comets	AHL	31	4	2	6	14	—	—	—	—	—
2025–26	Adirondack Thunder	ECHL	11	1	2	3	2	3	0	0	0	2
AHL totals			47	5	2	7	18	—	—	—	—	—

=== International ===
Year	Team	Event	Result	GP	G	A	Pts	PIM
2022	Canada	U18	5th	3	0	1	1	0
Junior totals				3	0	1	1	0

== Awards and honors ==
Award	Year	Ref
WHL
First All-Star Team	2023	
