= Luca Cagnoni =

Canadian ice hockey player (born 2004)

- Born: December 21, 2004 (age 21) Burnaby, British Columbia, Canada
- Height: 5 ft 9 in (175 cm)
- Weight: 180 lb (82 kg; 12 st 12 lb)
- Position: Defence
- Shoots: Left
- NHL team (P) Cur. team: San Jose Sharks; San Jose Barracuda (AHL)
- NHL draft: 123rd overall, 2023; San Jose Sharks
- Playing career: 2024–present

Luca Cagnoni (/kænˈjoʊni/ kan-YOHN-ee; born December 21, 2004) is a Canadian professional ice hockey player who is a defenceman for the San Jose Barracuda of the American Hockey League (AHL) while under contract to the San Jose Sharks of the National Hockey League (NHL). He was selected by the Sharks in the fourth round, with the 123rd overall pick, of the 2023 NHL entry draft.

== Playing career ==
=== Junior ===
Cagnoni joined the Portland Winterhawks of the Western Hockey League (WHL) in November 2020 after a 30-minute practice tryout while the team was on a road trip in Langley, British Columbia to play the Vancouver Giants. After the 30-minute drills, the team thought highly enough of him to take a chance on him and signed him. Cagnoni only played ten games with the Winterhawks in the 2020–21 season which had been cut short from 68 games to 24 due to the ongoing COVID-19 pandemic. Cagnoni played a total of four seasons for the Winterhawks. The 2023–24 season was Cagnoni's fourth and final season in Portland. He notched 18 goals and 72 assists to become the first WHL defenceman in 30 years to score 90 points which was last achieved in the 1992–93 season by Shane Peacock.

=== Professional ===
Cagnoni was selected by the San Jose Sharks of the National Hockey League (NHL) in the fourth round, 123rd overall, of the 2023 NHL entry draft. They signed Cagnoni to a three-year, entry-level contract on May 22, 2024. During the 2024–25 season, Cagnoni made his NHL debut with the Sharks on March 20, 2025, against the Carolina Hurricanes. He earned his first NHL point on March 22, assisting on a goal by William Eklund in a home game against the Boston Bruins. He spent the bulk of the 2024–25 season with the Sharks American Hockey League (AHL) affiliate, the San Jose Barracuda, where he was the highest-scoring rookie defenceman in seven years. He was named to the AHL All-Rookie Team.

Cagnoni started the 2025–26 season in the AHL with the San Jose Barracuda. He finished the season with 43 points, ranking fifth on the team overall, and first in points by a defenceman. On April 12, 2026, he was recalled from the AHL, and played the final three games of the season in the NHL with the Sharks.

Following a strong training camp, Cagnoni made the Sharks' opening night roster for the first time in his career ahead of the 2026–27 NHL season. In the season opener on October 1, 2026, he scored his first NHL goal, the overtime winner against the Florida Panthers, and became the first player in Sharks history to score his first NHL goal in overtime. On October 28, Cagnoni was sent back down to the AHL to continue the season with the Baraccuda.

== Career statistics ==
			Regular season					Playoffs
Season	Team	League	GP	G	A	Pts	PIM	GP	G	A	Pts	PIM
2019–20	Alberni Valley Bulldogs	BCHL	3	0	1	1	0	—	—	—	—	—
2020–21	Portland Winterhawks	WHL	10	0	3	3	2	—	—	—	—	—
2021–22	Portland Winterhawks	WHL	63	9	27	36	12	11	1	2	3	6
2022–23	Portland Winterhawks	WHL	67	17	47	64	46	9	1	6	7	10
2023–24	Portland Winterhawks	WHL	65	18	72	90	34	13	3	10	13	16
2024–25	San Jose Barracuda	AHL	64	16	36	52	28	6	0	3	3	6
2024–25	San Jose Sharks	NHL	6	0	2	2	8	—	—	—	—	—
2025–26	San Jose Barracuda	AHL	67	8	35	43	22	2	0	1	1	2
2025–26	San Jose Sharks	NHL	3	0	0	0	0	—	—	—	—	—
NHL totals			9	0	2	2	8	—	—	—	—	—

== Awards and honours ==
Award	Year(s)	Ref
WHL
U.S. Division Second All-Star Team	2023	
U.S. Division First All-Star Team	2024	
CHL
CHL Third All-Star Team	2024	
AHL
AHL All-Rookie Team	2025	
