= Fraser Minten =

Canadian ice hockey player (born 2004)

- Born: July 5, 2004 (age 22) Vancouver, British Columbia, Canada
- Height: 6 ft 2 in (188 cm)
- Weight: 204 lb (93 kg; 14 st 8 lb)
- Position: Centre
- Shoots: Left
- NHL team Former teams: Boston Bruins; Toronto Maple Leafs
- National team: Canada
- NHL draft: 38th overall, 2022; Toronto Maple Leafs
- Playing career: 2023–present

Fraser Pierre Minten (born July 5, 2004) is a Canadian professional ice hockey player who is a centre for the Boston Bruins of the National Hockey League (NHL). Minten was selected 38th overall, in the second round of the 2022 NHL entry draft, by the Toronto Maple Leafs.

== Early life ==
Minten was born in Vancouver, British Columbia to parents Chantal and Trevor Minten. He has a younger brother Bryce Minten, who also plays hockey. Growing up, Minten enjoyed reading and playing the piano, influenced by his grandparents, with whom he traveled during the summer months. Minten was named after his grandmother Glenda Minten (née Fraser).

== Playing career ==
=== Junior ===
Minten joined West Van Academy Prep where he played with Connor Bedard. Minten was drafted by Kamloops Blazers of the Western Hockey League (WHL) in the fourth round of the 2019 WHL Bantam Draft. He joined Kamloops for the 2020–21 season where he progressed from the fourth line to the third line. In his second year, the Blazers made the 2022 WHL playoffs and Minten played in 17 games. In his third season with the Blazers, he averaged over a point per game.

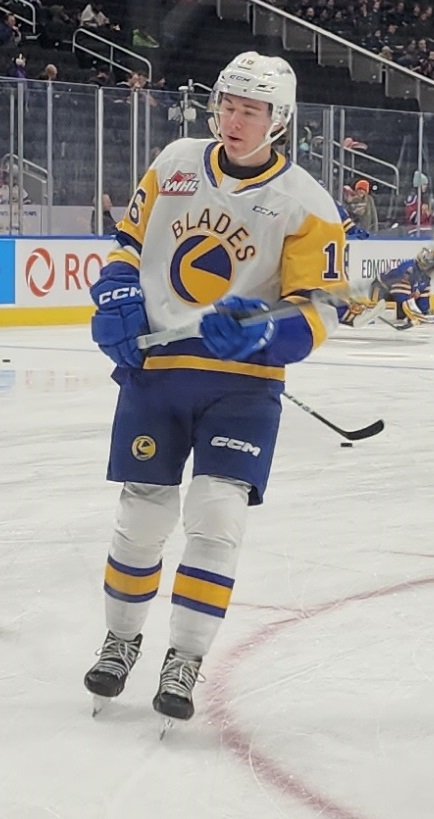
Minten with the Saskatoon Blades in January 2024.

After returning to Kamloops in the 2023–24 WHL season, Minten was named captain of the Blazers and had ten points in seven games before he was traded to the Saskatoon Blades for Jordan Keller and four draft picks on November 24, 2023. He finished the season playing in 36 games with Saskatoon with 38 points. The Blades made the WHL playoffs and he scored eight goals and 14 points in 16 games as Saskatoon advanced to the third round only to be knocked out by the league champion Moose Jaw Warriors.

=== Professional ===
==== Toronto Maple Leafs ====
Minten was selected by the Toronto Maple Leafs of the National Hockey League (NHL) in the second round, 38th overall of the 2022 NHL entry draft. He signed a three-year entry-level contract with the Maple Leafs on October 13, 2022. Minten attended the Maple Leafs' 2022 training camp but was sent back to the Blazers. He returned for the 2023 training camp and impressed team management, making the Leafs' opening night roster. He played in his first NHL game on October 11, 2023 in a 6–5 shootout victory over the Montreal Canadiens. On October 27, Minten returned to his junior team, the Kamloops Blazers.

Ahead of the 2024–25 season, Minten suffered a high ankle sprain in an exhibition game against the Montreal Canadiens in September 2024. He missed the entirety of Maple Leafs' training camp and began the season on Toronto injured reserve list. He was activated from injured reserve on October 29 and assigned to the Maple Leafs' American Hockey League (AHL) affiliate, the Toronto Marlies. On November 19, Minten was called up to the Maple Leafs in place of injured center David Kämpf. He scored his first NHL goal on November 20 against Adin Hill in the first period against the Vegas Golden Knights.

Minten notched two goals and four points through 15 regular season games before he was traded by the Maple Leafs, alongside a first-round pick in 2026 and a fourth-round pick in 2025, to the Boston Bruins in exchange for Brandon Carlo on March 7, 2025.

==== Boston Bruins ====
Upon joining the Bruins organization, Minten was assigned to the team's AHL affiliate, the Providence Bruins. In only his second game with the club, Minten recorded a hat-trick and an assist in a 4–1 win over the Springfield Thunderbirds.

After ten games in Providence - in which he scored three goals and four assists - Minten was recalled by Boston on April 5, 2025, debuting with the team that night against the Carolina Hurricanes. On April 8, he scored his first goal as a Bruin in a 7-2 win over the New Jersey Devils. With Boston missing the playoffs, Minten was returned to Providence on April 16.

Minten played his first full NHL season during the 2025-26 season, recording 17 goals and 18 assists for 35 points in 82 games. He was named the league's rookie of the month for January 2026 after recording eight goals and six assists in 14 games that month. Minten went scoreless in six playoff games during the team's first round series against the Buffalo Sabres.

On September 8, 2026, the Bruins signed Minten to a seven-year, $50.4 million contract extension.

== International play ==
Minten was selected to play for Canada's junior team at the 2024 World Junior Ice Hockey Championships. Minten captained the team, scoring one goal and three points in five games as Canada was eliminated in the quarterfinals by the Czech Republic.

== Career statistics ==
=== Regular season and playoffs ===
			Regular season					Playoffs
Season	Team	League	GP	G	A	Pts	PIM	GP	G	A	Pts	PIM
2019–20	Prince George Spruce Kings	BCHL	2	0	0	0	0	—	—	—	—	—
2020–21	Kamloops Blazers	WHL	20	4	14	18	12	—	—	—	—	—
2021–22	Kamloops Blazers	WHL	67	20	35	55	57	17	6	10	16	4
2022–23	Kamloops Blazers	WHL	57	31	36	67	55	10	2	2	4	4
2023–24	Toronto Maple Leafs	NHL	4	0	0	0	2	—	—	—	—	—
2023–24	Kamloops Blazers	WHL	7	3	7	10	4	—	—	—	—	—
2023–24	Saskatoon Blades	WHL	36	19	19	38	21	16	8	6	14	4
2024–25	Toronto Marlies	AHL	26	6	7	13	8	—	—	—	—	—
2024–25	Toronto Maple Leafs	NHL	15	2	2	4	0	—	—	—	—	—
2024–25	Providence Bruins	AHL	11	3	4	7	4	8	0	2	2	8
2024–25	Boston Bruins	NHL	6	1	0	1	2	—	—	—	—	—
2025–26	Boston Bruins	NHL	82	17	18	35	20	6	0	0	0	0
NHL totals			107	20	20	40	24	6	0	0	0	0

=== International ===
Year	Team	Event	Result	GP	G	A	Pts	PIM
2024	Canada	WJC	5th	5	1	2	3	6
2026	Canada	WC	4th	10	1	3	4	4
Junior totals				5	1	2	3	6
Senior totals				10	1	3	4	4

== Awards and honours ==
Award	Year	Ref
NHL
NHL Rookie of the Month (January)	2026	
Boston Bruins
Seventh Player Award	2026	
