= CHL Top Scorer Award =

Annual award to a Canadian Hockey League player

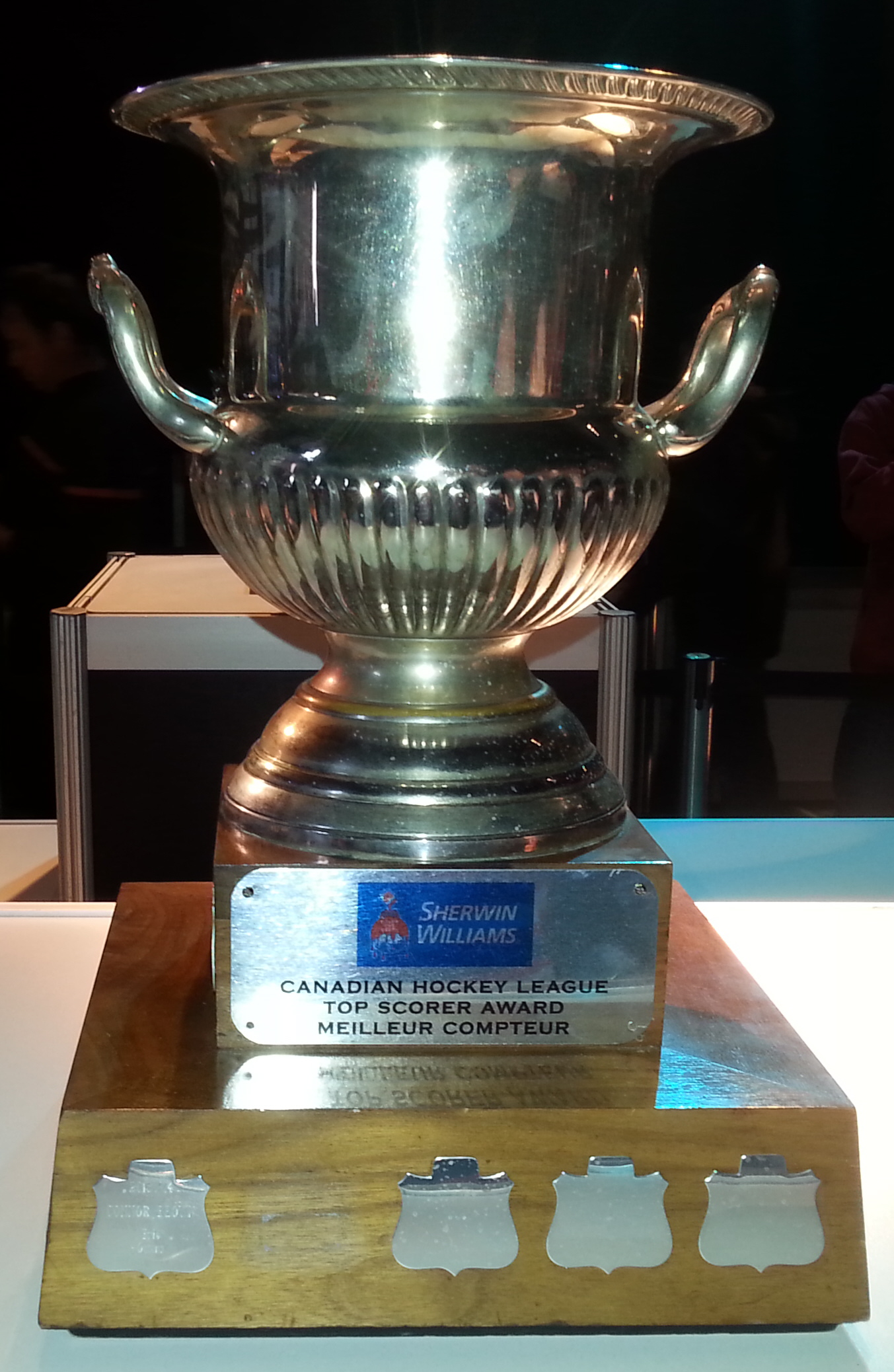
- Sport: Ice hockey
- Awarded for: Annually to the highest-scoring player in the Canadian Hockey League

History
- First award: 1994
- First winner: Jason Allison
- Most wins: Sidney Crosby; Conor Garland (2)
- Most recent: Markus Ruck

The CHL Top Scorer Award is given out annually to the highest-scoring player in the Canadian Hockey League. It was first awarded in 1994. The winner of the CHL Top Scorer Award will be one of the recipients of the constituent league scoring champions; Jean Béliveau Trophy (QMJHL), Eddie Powers Memorial Trophy (OHL), or the Bob Clarke Trophy (WHL). The only two players to win more than once are Sidney Crosby and Conor Garland.

== Winners ==
List of CHL Top Scorer Award recipients.

Season	Player	Pos	Team	League	Pts
1993–94	Jason Allison	C	London Knights	OHL	142
1994–95	Marc Savard	C	Oshawa Generals	OHL	139
1995–96	Daniel Briere	C	Drummondville Voltigeurs	QMJHL	163
1996–97	Pavel Rosa	RW	Hull Olympiques	QMJHL	152
1997–98	Ramzi Abid	LW	Chicoutimi Saguenéens	QMJHL	135
1998–99	Mike Ribeiro	C	Rouyn-Noranda Huskies	QMJHL	167
1999–2000	Brad Richards	C	Rimouski Océanic	QMJHL	186
2000–01	Simon Gamache	C	Val-d'Or Foreurs	QMJHL	184
2001–02	Pierre-Marc Bouchard	RW	Chicoutimi Saguenéens	QMJHL	140
2002–03	Corey Locke	C	Ottawa 67's	OHL	151
2003–04	Sidney Crosby	C	Rimouski Océanic	QMJHL	135
2004–05	Sidney Crosby	C	Rimouski Océanic	QMJHL	168
2005–06	Alexander Radulov	RW	Quebec Remparts	QMJHL	152
2006–07	Patrick Kane	RW	London Knights	OHL	145
2007–08	Justin Azevedo	C	Kitchener Rangers	OHL	124
2008–09	Yannick Riendeau	RW	Drummondville Voltigeurs	QMJHL	126
2009–10	Brandon Kozun	RW	Calgary Hitmen	WHL	107
2010–11	Linden Vey	C	Medicine Hat Tigers	WHL	116
2011–12	Brendan Shinnimin	C	Tri-City Americans	WHL	134
2012–13	Brendan Leipsic	C	Portland Winterhawks	WHL	120
2013–14	Connor Brown	RW	Erie Otters	OHL	128
2014–15	Dylan Strome (T)	C	Erie Otters	OHL	129
2014–15	Conor Garland (T)	RW	Moncton Wildcats	QMJHL	129
2015–16	Conor Garland	RW	Moncton Wildcats	QMJHL	128
2016–17	Sam Steel	C	Regina Pats	WHL	131
2017–18	Jayden Halbgewachs	C	Moose Jaw Warriors	WHL	129
2018–19	Jason Robertson	LW	Kingston/Niagara	OHL	117
2019–20	Marco Rossi	C	Ottawa 67's	OHL	120
2020–21	Not awarded due to COVID-19 pandemic				
2021–22	Wyatt Johnston	C	Windsor Spitfires	OHL	124
2022–23	Connor Bedard	C	Regina Pats	WHL	143
2023–24	Jagger Firkus	C	Moose Jaw Warriors	WHL	126
2024–25	Michael Misa	C	Saginaw Spirit	OHL	134
2025–26	Markus Ruck	C	Medicine Hat Tigers	WHL	108

== See also ==
- List of Canadian Hockey League awards
