= Lynden Lakovic =

Canadian ice hockey player (born 2006)

- Lakovic in 2026
- Born: December 12, 2006 (age 19) Kelowna, British Columbia, Canada
- Height: 6 ft 4 in (193 cm)
- Weight: 203 lb (92 kg; 14 st 7 lb)
- Position: Right wing
- Shoots: Left
- NHL team (P) Cur. team: Washington Capitals; Hershey Bears (AHL)
- NHL draft: 27th overall, 2025; Washington Capitals
- Playing career: 2026–present

Lynden Lakovic (born December 12, 2006) is a Canadian professional ice hockey player for the Hershey Bears of the American Hockey League (AHL) while under contract as a prospect to the Washington Capitals of the National Hockey League (NHL). He was drafted 27th overall by the Capitals in the 2025 NHL entry draft.

== Playing career ==
During the 2023–24 season, Lakovic recorded 18 goals and 21 assists in 68 games, and helped the Moose Jaw Warriors win the Ed Chynoweth Cup. During the 2024–25 season, in his draft eligible year, he recorded 27 goals and 31 assists in 47 games. Lakovic missed seven weeks due to a lower-body injury. On February 14, 2025, he returned from injury and was named team captain.

On June 27, 2025, he was drafted 27th overall by the Washington Capitals in the 2025 NHL entry draft. He was later signed to a three-year, entry-level contract with the Capitals on July 5, 2026.

== Personal life ==
Lakovic's uncle, Sasha Lakovic, was a former professional ice hockey player.

== Career statistics ==
=== Regular season and playoffs ===
			Regular season					Playoffs
Season	Team	League	GP	G	A	Pts	PIM	GP	G	A	Pts	PIM
2021–22	West Kelowna Warriors	BCHL	2	0	0	0	2	—	—	—	—	—
2021–22	Moose Jaw Warriors	WHL	1	0	0	0	0	—	—	—	—	—
2022–23	Moose Jaw Warriors	WHL	37	2	5	7	8	10	3	0	3	2
2023–24	Moose Jaw Warriors	WHL	68	18	21	39	14	20	5	3	8	2
2024–25	Moose Jaw Warriors	WHL	47	27	31	58	4	—	—	—	—	—
2025–26	Moose Jaw Warriors	WHL	22	18	11	29	8	—	—	—	—	—
WHL totals			175	65	68	133	34	30	8	3	11	4

=== International ===
Year	Team	Event	Result	GP	G	A	Pts	PIM
2022	Canada Black	U17	4th	7	1	2	3	2
Junior totals				7	1	2	3	2

== Awards and honours ==
Award	Year
WHL
Ed Chynoweth Cup champion	2024

Awards and achievements
Preceded by Terik Parascak	Washington Capitals first-round draft pick 2025	Succeeded by Oliver Suvanto
