= Matthew Savoie (ice hockey) =

Canadian ice hockey player (born 2004)

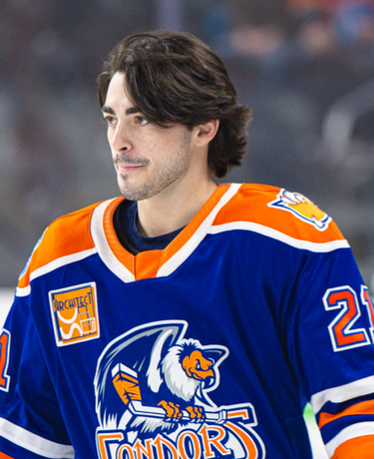
- Savoie in 2025
- Born: January 1, 2004 (age 22) St. Albert, Alberta, Canada
- Height: 5 ft 10 in (178 cm)
- Weight: 180 lb (82 kg; 12 st 12 lb)
- Position: Centre
- Shoots: Right
- NHL team Former teams: Edmonton Oilers; Buffalo Sabres
- NHL draft: 9th overall, 2022; Buffalo Sabres
- Playing career: 2023–present

Matthew Savoie (/səˈvɔɪ/ suh-VOY; born January 1, 2004) is a Canadian professional ice hockey player who is a centre for the Edmonton Oilers of the National Hockey League (NHL). He was drafted ninth overall by the Buffalo Sabres in the 2022 NHL entry draft.

== Playing career ==
=== Junior ===
Savoie applied for exceptional player status to enter the Western Hockey League (WHL) as a 15-year-old, but was rejected. The following week, he committed to play college ice hockey for the University of Denver. Despite his NCAA commitment, he was selected first overall in the 2019 WHL bantam draft by the Winnipeg Ice.

In June 2019, Savoie broke his commitment to Denver and signed with the Ice. He began the year with the Dubuque Fighting Saints of the United States Hockey League, where he recorded 38 points in 34 games. He entered the WHL upon turning 16, and in 22 games recorded seven points, all assists.

In his first full WHL season in 2021–22, Savoie led all rookies in scoring with 90 points in 65 games, ranking seventh overall and third on the Ice. Following the season, he was drafted ninth overall by the Buffalo Sabres in the 2022 NHL entry draft. He was subsequently signed to a three-year, entry-level contract with the team on July 16, 2022.

=== Professional ===
At the end of the 2022–23 WHL season, Savoie made his professional debut with the Rochester Americans, American Hockey League (AHL) affiliate of the Sabres, appearing in two playoff games against the Hershey Bears.

Savoie sustained an upper-body injury during rookie camp entering the 2023–24 season, and began the year on injured reserve. On October 22, 2023, he was assigned to the Americans on a conditioning loan, where he recorded five points in six games. He was recalled to the Sabres on November 6, 2023. Savoie made his NHL debut on November 10, 2023, recording less than four minutes of ice time. The next day, he was reassigned to the WHL's Wenatchee Wild (who had moved from Winnipeg that summer). On January 4, 2024, he was traded from Wenatchee to the Moose Jaw Warriors in exchange for seven draft picks, including two first-round picks. Following his Warriors debut, in which he had two goals and five points in a 7–2 victory over the Vancouver Giants, Savoie was named WHL player of the week for the week ending January 14.

On July 5, 2024, Savoie was traded to the Edmonton Oilers, in exchange for Ryan McLeod and Tyler Tullio.

On February 22, 2025, Savoie recorded his first career NHL point in an away game against the Philadelphia Flyers, assisting on Leon Draisaitl's 41st goal of the season. He scored his first NHL goal on October 30 in a 4–3 overtime loss to the New York Rangers.

On April 16, 2026, Savoie scored his first career hat-trick in the final game of the 2025–26 season against the Vancouver Canucks, all in the first period. Savoie finished the season tied for sixth in rookie scoring.

Prior to the start of the 2026-27 season, Savoie was injured in training camp. On October 1, Savoie was placed on the Long-Term Injured Reserve.

== Personal life ==
Savoie's older brother, Carter, was drafted in the fourth round (100^{th} overall) by the Edmonton Oilers in the 2020 NHL entry draft.

== Career statistics ==
=== Regular season and playoffs ===
			Regular season					Playoffs
Season	Team	League	GP	G	A	Pts	PIM	GP	G	A	Pts	PIM
2019–20	Winnipeg Ice	WHL	22	0	7	7	12	—	—	—	—	—
2020–21	Sherwood Park Crusaders	AJHL	4	3	3	6	0	—	—	—	—	—
2020–21	Dubuque Fighting Saints	USHL	34	21	17	38	8	2	0	0	0	15
2021–22	Winnipeg Ice	WHL	65	35	55	90	32	10	6	6	12	2
2022–23	Winnipeg Ice	WHL	62	38	57	95	26	19	11	18	29	8
2022–23	Rochester Americans	AHL	—	—	—	—	—	2	0	0	0	0
2023–24	Buffalo Sabres	NHL	1	0	0	0	0	—	—	—	—	—
2023–24	Rochester Americans	AHL	6	2	3	5	6	—	—	—	—	—
2023–24	Wenatchee Wild	WHL	11	11	13	24	2	—	—	—	—	—
2023–24	Moose Jaw Warriors	WHL	23	19	28	47	8	19	10	14	24	10
2024–25	Bakersfield Condors	AHL	66	19	35	54	28	—	—	—	—	—
2024–25	Edmonton Oilers	NHL	4	0	1	1	0	—	—	—	—	—
2025–26	Edmonton Oilers	NHL	82	18	19	37	24	6	0	1	1	2
2025–26	Bakersfield Condors	AHL	1	0	1	1	0	—	—	—	—	—
NHL totals			87	18	20	38	24	6	0	1	1	2

=== International ===
Year	Team	Event	Result	GP	G	A	Pts	PIM
2019	Canada White	U17	4th	6	1	5	6	2
2024	Canada	WJC	5th	4	0	1	1	4
Junior totals				10	1	6	7	6

== Awards and honours ==
Award	Year
USHL
All-Rookie Team	2021
WHL
East First All-Star Team	2022
Ed Chynoweth Cup	2024

Awards and achievements
Preceded by Isak Rosén	Buffalo Sabres first-round draft pick 2022	Succeeded by Noah Östlund
