= Sergey Tereshchenko (disambiguation) =

Sergei or Sergey Tereshchenko or Tereschenko (Russian: Сергей Терещенко) may refer to:

- Sergey Tereshchenko (1951–2023), Kazakhstani politician
- Sergei Tereshchenko (born 1984), Russian footballer
- Sergei Tereschenko (born 1991), Russian ice hockey defenceman

== See also ==
- Sergey Tereshchenkov (1938–2006), Soviet cyclist
