= 2022 NHL entry draft =

2022 North American ice hockey draft

General information
- Date: July 7–8, 2022
- Location: Bell Centre; Montreal, Quebec, Canada
- Networks: Sportsnet (Canada); ESPN, ESPN+, NHL Network (United States)

Overview
- 225 total selections in 7 rounds
- First selection: (Slovakia) Juraj Slafkovsky (Montreal Canadiens)

The 2022 NHL entry draft was the 60th draft for the National Hockey League. It was held on July 7–8, 2022, at the Bell Centre in Montreal. Montreal was originally scheduled to host the 2020 draft but was unable to do so due to the COVID-19 pandemic. For the first time since 1985, the team hosting the draft selected first overall.

The first three selections were Juraj Slafkovsky by the hosting Montreal Canadiens, Simon Nemec by the New Jersey Devils, and Logan Cooley by the Arizona Coyotes. The selections of Slovak players Slafkovsky and Nemec made this the second time that the top two draftees came from a single European country, after Russians Alexander Ovechkin and Evgeni Malkin in 2004.

== Eligibility ==
Ice hockey players born between January 1, 2002, and September 15, 2004, were eligible for selection in the 2022 NHL entry draft. Additionally, un-drafted, non-North American players born in 2001 were eligible for the draft; and those players who were drafted in the 2020 NHL entry draft, but not signed by an NHL team and who were born after June 30, 2002, were also eligible to re-enter the draft.

== Draft lottery ==
External videos
- Who will get the first pick in NHL Draft? NHL Commissioner Gary Bettman presides over the 2022 draft lottery, NHL's official YouTube channel. May 10, 2022.

Beginning with the 2014–15 NHL season the NHL changed the weighting system that was used in previous years. Under the new system, the odds of winning the draft lottery for the four lowest finishing teams in the league decreased, while the odds for the other non-playoff teams increased. As the league reduced the number of lottery drawings before the 2021–22 season, this resulted in two lotteries being held for this draft. Beginning with this lottery and continuing onward, the teams winning one of the two drawings are allowed to move up a maximum of ten spots in the draft order and a team is only allowed to win the lottery twice in a five-year period. As a result only the eleven lowest finishing teams were eligible to win the first overall selection. The team that won the first drawing would move up to the first selection if they were seeded 1–11, teams seeded 12–16 would move up ten spots. For example, If the team seeded 12 won the first draw they would secure the second overall pick and the team seeded first would secure the first overall pick by default. For the second draw, the fifteen remaining teams were re-seeded and the teams seeded 1–12 could move up to the second overall pick if it was still available after the end of the first draw, teams seeded 13–15 could move up a maximum of ten spots. If the second overall pick was not available to the winner of the second draw that team would be awarded the next highest available selection. After the two draws were complete, all remaining draft picks were assigned to the remaining teams in inverse order of regular season finish.

The Montreal Canadiens and New Jersey Devils won the two draft lotteries that took place on May 10, 2022, giving them the first and second picks overall. Montreal retained the first pick, while New Jersey moved up three spots. Arizona, Seattle and Philadelphia each dropped one spot to third, fourth and fifth overall, respectively.

Indicates team won first overall
Indicates team won second overall
Indicates teams that did not win a lottery

Complete draft position odds
Team	1st	2nd	3rd	4th	5th	6th	7th	8th	9th	10th	11th	12th	13th	14th	15th	16th
Montreal	25.5%	18.8%	55.7%													
Arizona	13.5%	14.4%	30.7%	41.7%												
Seattle	11.5%	11.2%	7.8%	39.7%	29.8%											
Philadelphia	9.5%	9.5%	0.3%	15.4%	44.6%	20.8%										
New Jersey	8.5%	8.6%	0.3%		24.5%	44.0%	14.2%									
Chicago	7.5%	7.7%	0.2%			34.1%	41.4%	9.1%								
Ottawa	6.5%	6.7%	0.2%				44.4%	36.5%	5.6%							
Detroit	6.0%	6.2%	0.2%					54.4%	30.0%	3.2%						
Buffalo	5.0%	5.2%	0.2%						64.4%	23.5%	1.7%					
Anaheim	3.5%	3.7%	0.1%							73.3%	18.4%	0.9%				
San Jose	3.0%	3.2%	0.1%								79.9%	13.4%	0.5%			
Columbus		5.3%										85.7%	8.9%	0.2%		
NY Islanders			4.3%										90.7%	5.1%	>0.0%	
Winnipeg				3.1%										94.7%	2.1%	>0.0%
Vancouver					1.1%										97.9%	1.1%
Vegas						1.0%										98.9%

== Top prospects ==
Source: NHL Central Scouting (May 5, 2022) ranking.

Ranking	North American skaters	European skaters
1	(Canada) Shane Wright (C)	(Slovakia) Juraj Slafkovsky (LW)
2	(United States) Logan Cooley (C)	(Finland) Joakim Kemell (RW)
3	(United States) Cutter Gauthier (LW)	(Slovakia) Simon Nemec (D)
4	(Canada) Matthew Savoie (C)	(Czech Republic) David Jiricek (D)
5	(Canada) Conor Geekie (C)	(Austria) Marco Kasper (C)
6	(Russia) Pavel Mintyukov (D)	(Sweden) Jonathan Lekkerimaki (RW)
7	(Canada) Kevin Korchinski (D)	(Russia) Danila Yurov (RW)
8	(Canada) Luca Del Bel Belluz (C)	(Sweden) Liam Ohgren (LW)
9	(United States) Isaac Howard (LW)	(Switzerland) Lian Bichsel (D)
10	(Canada) Owen Beck (C)	(Finland) Brad Lambert (C)

Ranking	North American goalies	European goalies
1	(Canada) Tyler Brennan	(Finland) Topias Leinonen
2	(Belarus) Ivan Zhigalov	(Sweden) Hugo Havelid
3	(United States) Dylan Silverstein	(Czech Republic) Jan Spunar

== Selections by round ==
The order of the 2022 entry draft is listed below.

=== Round one ===
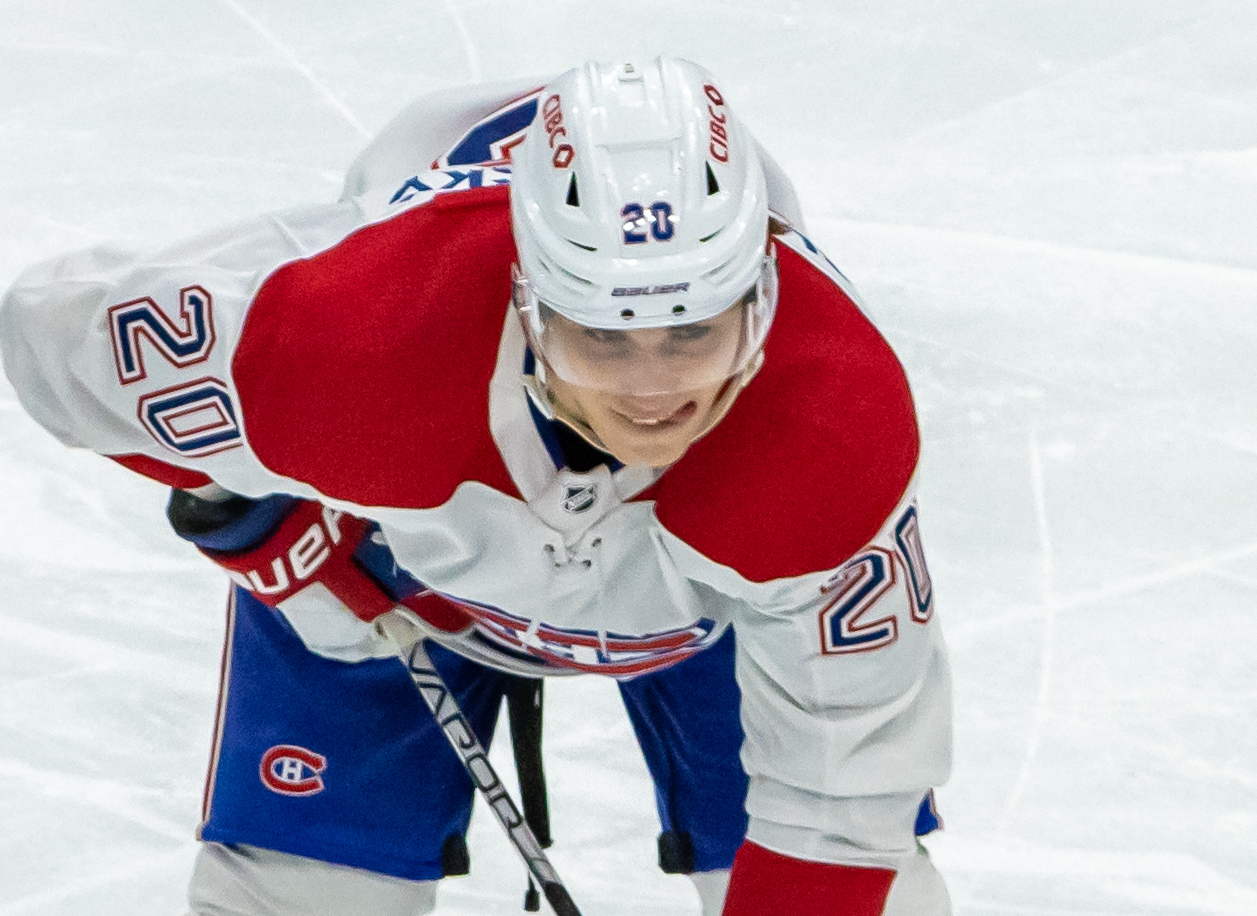
Juraj Slafkovsky was selected first overall by the Montreal Canadiens.

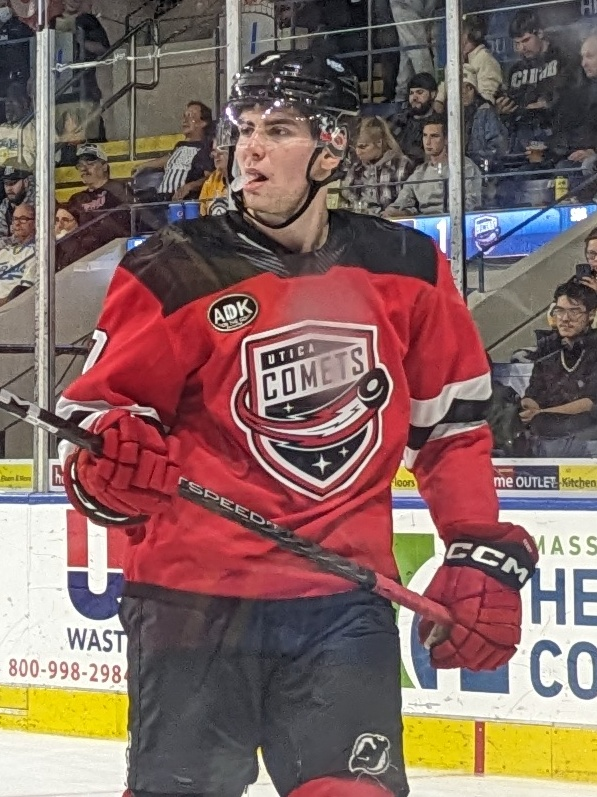
Simon Nemec was selected second overall by the New Jersey Devils.

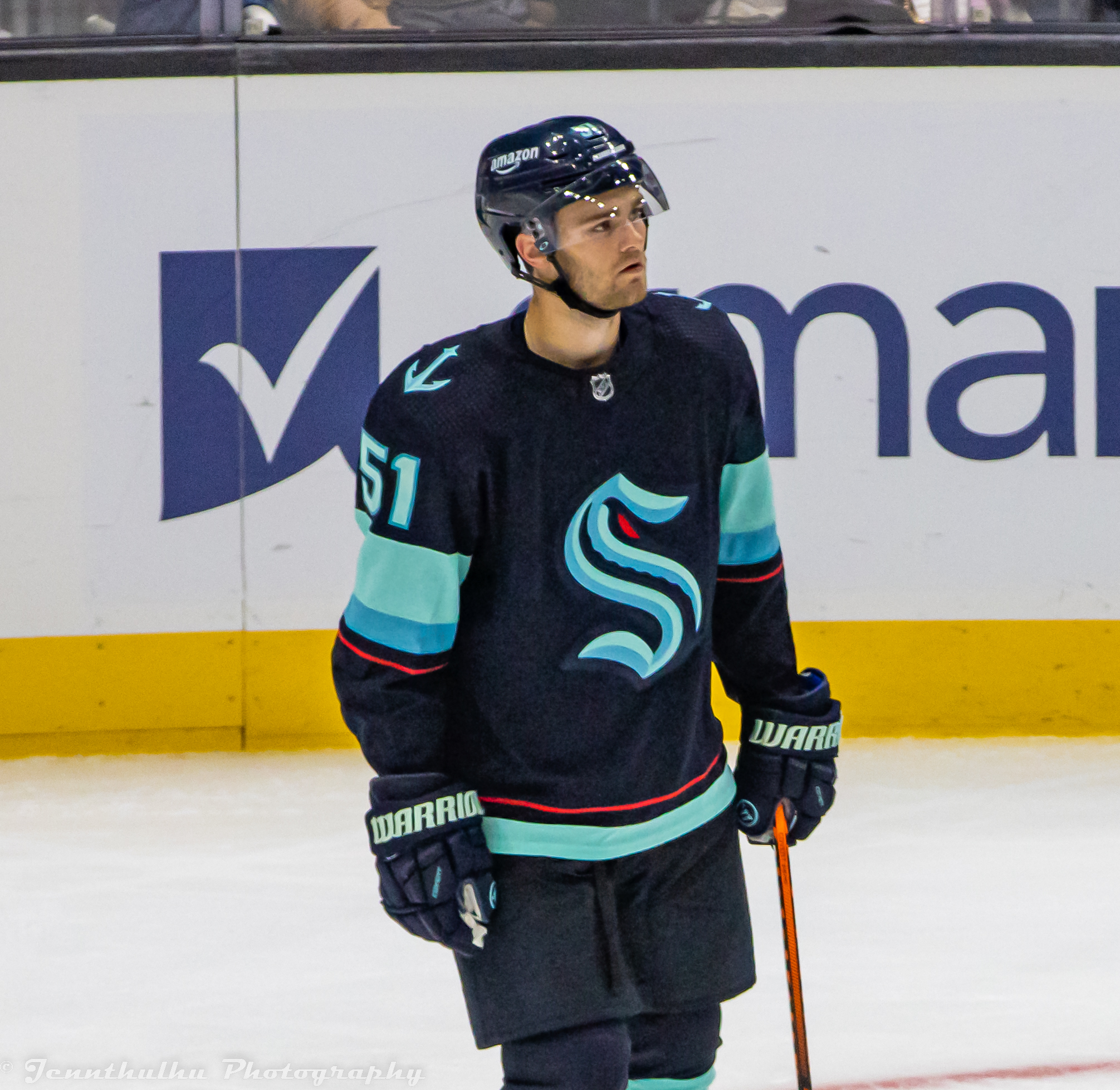
Shane Wright was selected fourth overall by the Seattle Kraken.

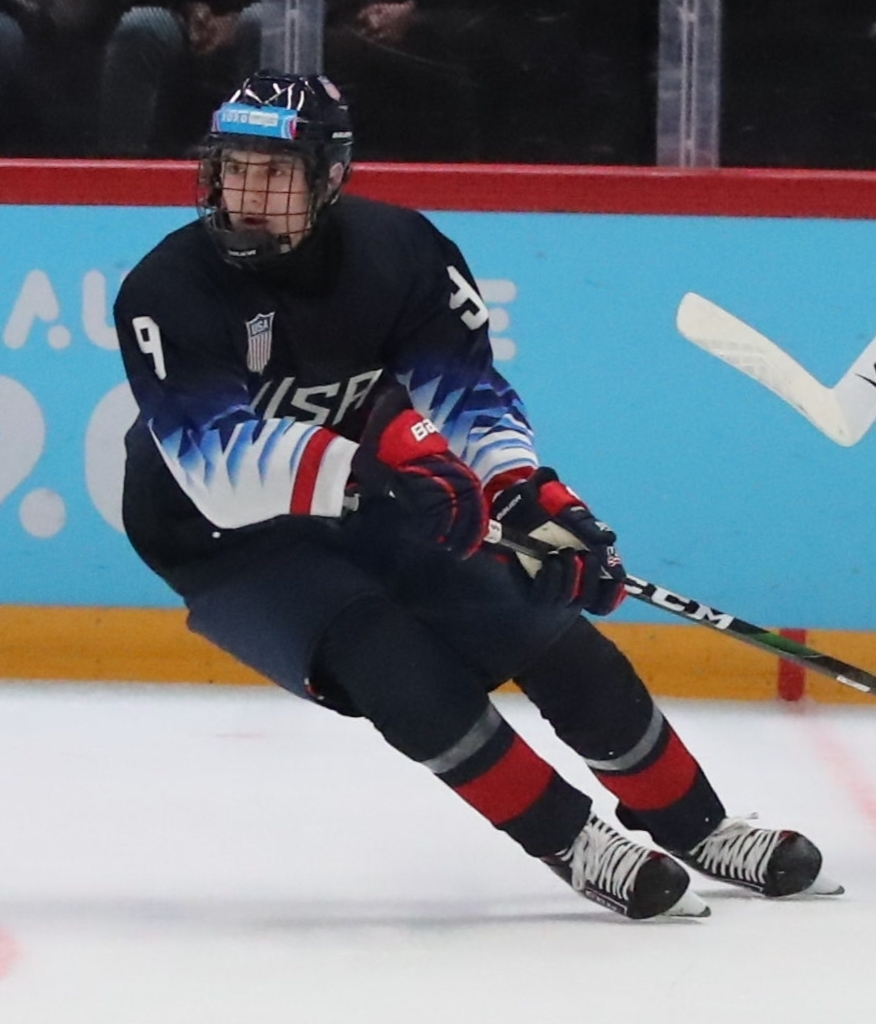
Cutter Gauthier was selected fifth overall by the Philadelphia Flyers.

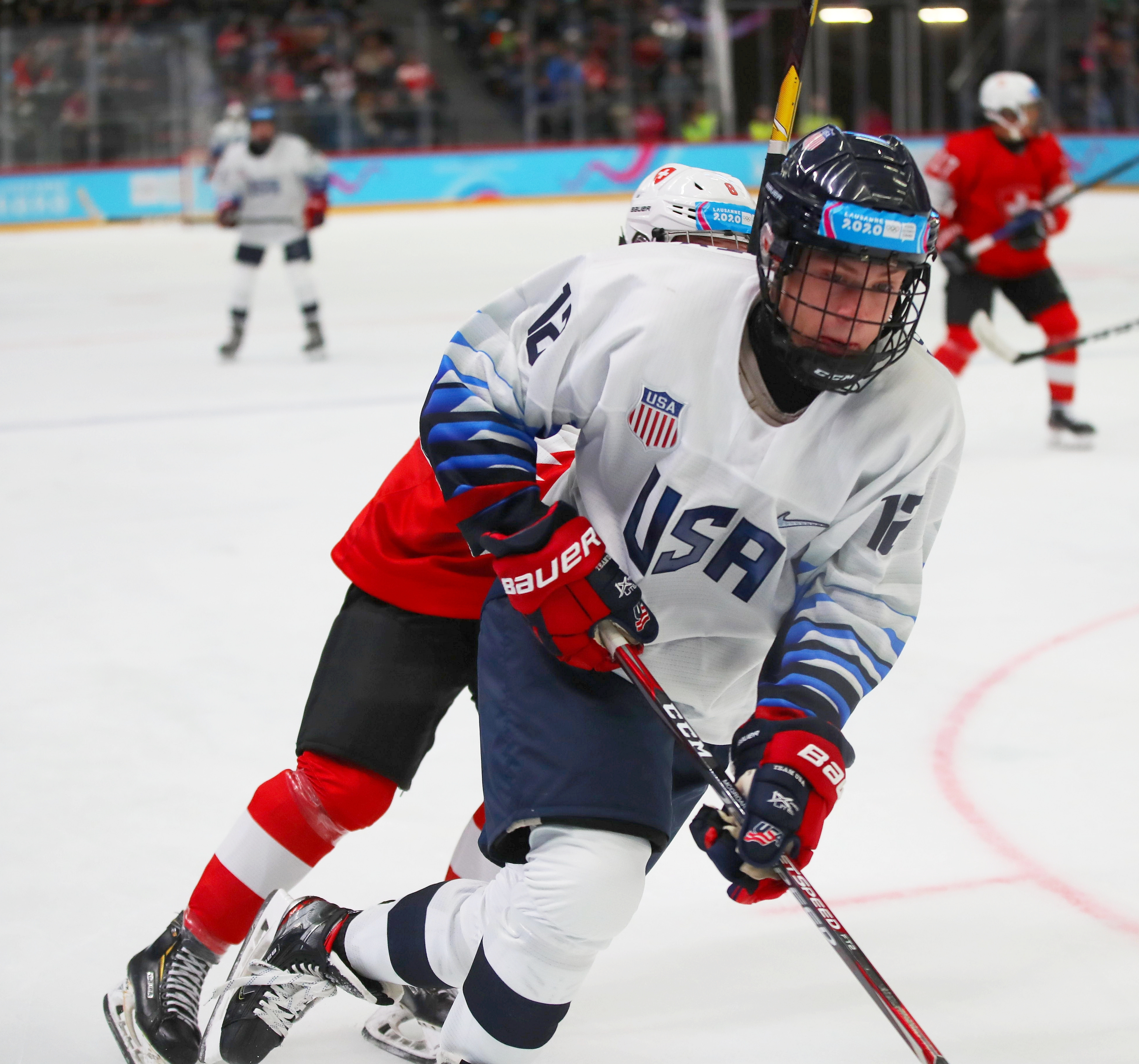
Rutger McGroarty was selected 14th overall by the Winnipeg Jets.

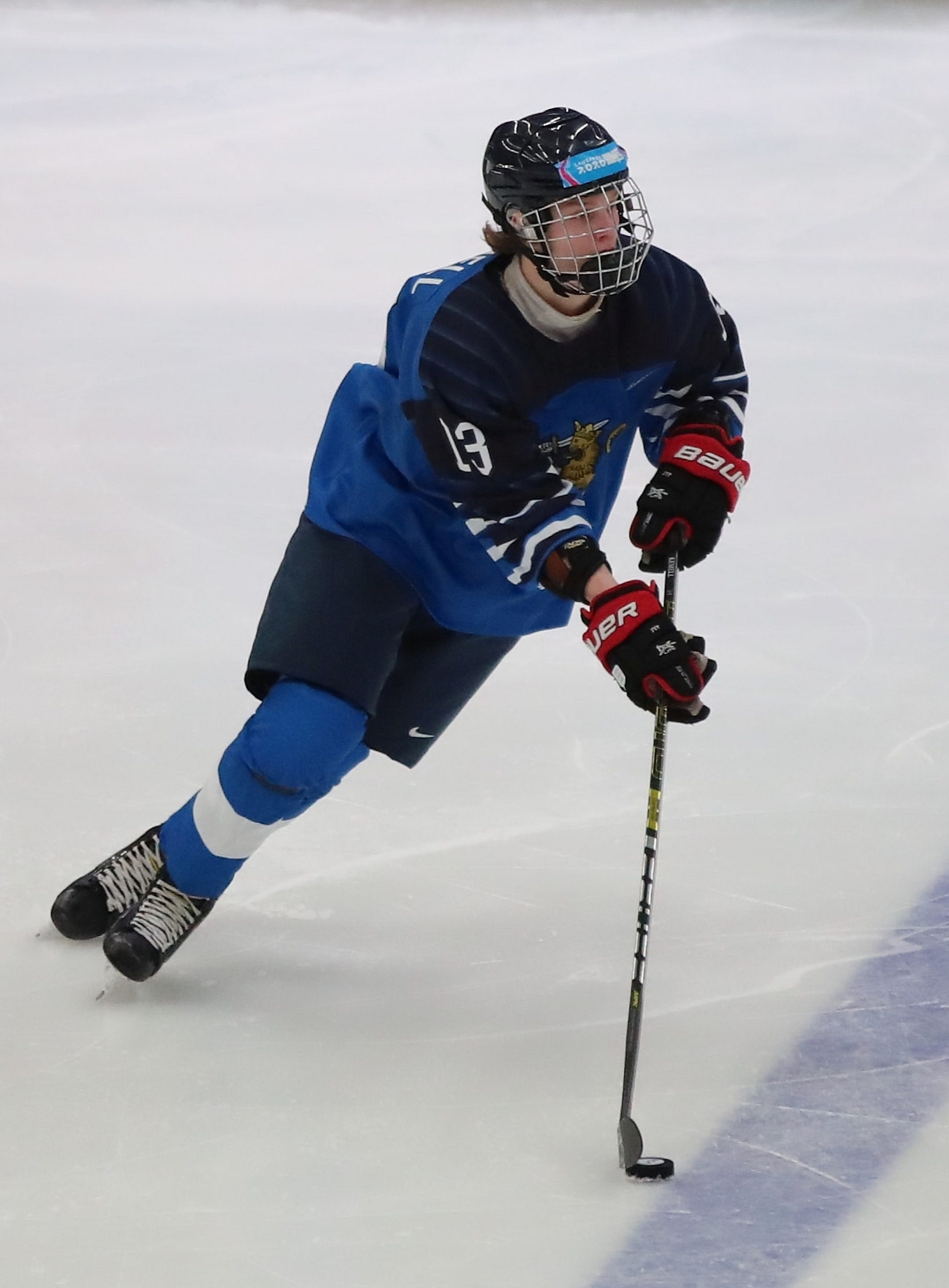
Joakim Kemell was selected 17th overall by the Nashville Predators.

Jimmy Snuggerud was selected 23rd overall by the St. Louis Blues

#	Player	Nationality	NHL team	College/junior/club team
1	Juraj Slafkovsky (LW)	Slovakia	Montreal Canadiens	HC TPS (Liiga)
2	Simon Nemec (D)	Slovakia	New Jersey Devils	HK Nitra (Tipos Extraliga)
3	Logan Cooley (C)	United States	Arizona Coyotes	U.S. NTDP (USHL)
4	Shane Wright (C)	Canada	Seattle Kraken	Kingston Frontenacs (OHL)
5	Cutter Gauthier (LW)	United States	Philadelphia Flyers	U.S. NTDP (USHL)
6	David Jiricek (D)	Czech Republic	Columbus Blue Jackets (from Chicago)^{1}	HC Skoda Plzen (Czech Extraliga)
7	Kevin Korchinski (D)	Canada	Chicago Blackhawks (from Ottawa)^{2}	Seattle Thunderbirds (WHL)
8	Marco Kasper (C)	Austria	Detroit Red Wings	Rogle BK (SHL)
9	Matthew Savoie (C)	Canada	Buffalo Sabres	Winnipeg Ice (WHL)
10	Pavel Mintyukov (D)	Russia	Anaheim Ducks	Saginaw Spirit (OHL)
11	Conor Geekie (C)	Canada	Arizona Coyotes (from San Jose)^{3}	Winnipeg Ice (WHL)
12	Denton Mateychuk (D)	Canada	Columbus Blue Jackets	Moose Jaw Warriors (WHL)
13	Frank Nazar (C)	United States	Chicago Blackhawks (from NY Islanders via Montreal)^{4}	U.S. NTDP (USHL)
14	Rutger McGroarty (RW)	United States	Winnipeg Jets	U.S. NTDP (USHL)
15	Jonathan Lekkerimaki (RW)	Sweden	Vancouver Canucks	Djurgardens IF (SHL)
16	Noah Ostlund (C)	Sweden	Buffalo Sabres (from Vegas)^{5}	Djurgardens IF (SHL)
17	Joakim Kemell (RW)	Finland	Nashville Predators	JYP Jyvaskyla (Liiga)
18	Lian Bichsel (D)	Switzerland	Dallas Stars	Leksands IF (SHL)
19	Liam Ohgren (LW)	Sweden	Minnesota Wild (from Los Angeles)^{6}	Djurgardens IF (SHL)
20	Ivan Miroshnichenko (RW)	Russia	Washington Capitals	Omskie Krylya (VHL)
21	Owen Pickering (D)	Canada	Pittsburgh Penguins	Swift Current Broncos (WHL)
22	Nathan Gaucher (C)	Canada	Anaheim Ducks (from Boston)^{7}	Quebec Remparts (QMJHL)
23	Jimmy Snuggerud (RW)	United States	St. Louis Blues	U.S. NTDP (USHL)
24	Danila Yurov (RW)	Russia	Minnesota Wild	Metallurg Magnitogorsk (KHL)
25	Sam Rinzel (D)	United States	Chicago Blackhawks (from Toronto)^{8}	Chaska Hawks (USHS-MN)
26	Filip Mesar (RW)	Slovakia	Montreal Canadiens (from Calgary)^{9}	HK Poprad (Tipos Extraliga)
27	Filip Bystedt (C)	Sweden	San Jose Sharks (from Carolina via Montreal and Arizona)^{10}	Linkoping HC (SHL)
28	Jiri Kulich (C)	Czech Republic	Buffalo Sabres (from Florida)^{11}	Karlovy Vary (Czech Extraliga)
29	Maveric Lamoureux (D)	Canada	Arizona Coyotes (from Edmonton)^{12}	Drummondville Voltigeurs (QMJHL)
30	Brad Lambert (C)	Finland	Winnipeg Jets (from NY Rangers)^{13}	Lahti Pelicans (Liiga)
31	Isaac Howard (LW)	United States	Tampa Bay Lightning	U.S. NTDP (USHL)
32	Reid Schaefer (LW)	Canada	Edmonton Oilers (from Colorado via Arizona)^{14}	Seattle Thunderbirds (WHL)

Notes

1. The Chicago Blackhawks' first-round pick went to the Columbus Blue Jackets as the result of a trade on July 23, 2021, that sent Seth Jones, Tampa Bay's first-round pick in 2021 and a sixth-round pick in 2022 to Chicago in exchange for Adam Boqvist, a first and second-round pick both in 2021 and this pick (being conditional at the time of the trade). The condition – Columbus will receive a first-round pick in 2022 if Chicago does not win either of the two draws in the 2022 Draft Lottery – was converted when the Blackhawks did not win either draw in the 2022 draft lottery on May 10, 2022.
2. The Ottawa Senators' first-round pick went to the Chicago Blackhawks as the result of a trade on July 7, 2022, that sent Alex DeBrincat to Ottawa in exchange for a second-round pick in 2022, a third-round pick in 2024 and this pick.
3. The San Jose Sharks' first-round pick went to the Arizona Coyotes as the result of a trade on July 7, 2022, that sent Carolina's first-round-pick in 2022 (27th overall), a second-round pick in 2022 (34th overall) and the Islanders' second-round pick in 2022 (45th overall) to San Jose in exchange for this pick.
4. The New York Islanders' first-round pick went to the Chicago Blackhawks as the result of a trade on July 7, 2022, that sent Kirby Dach to Montreal in exchange for a third-round pick in 2022 (66th overall) and this pick.
  Montreal previously acquired this pick as the result of a trade on July 7, 2022, that sent Alexander Romanov and a fourth-round pick in 2022 (98th overall) to the Islanders in exchange for this pick.
5. The Vegas Golden Knights' first-round pick went to the Buffalo Sabres as the result of a trade on November 4, 2021, that sent Jack Eichel and a conditional third-round pick in 2023 to Vegas in exchange for Alex Tuch, Peyton Krebs, a conditional second-round pick in 2023 and this pick (being conditional at the time of the trade). The condition – Buffalo will receive a first-round pick in 2022 if Vegas' first-round pick is outside of the top ten selections – was converted when the Golden Knights did not win either draw in the 2022 draft lottery on May 10, 2022.
6. The Los Angeles Kings' first-round pick went to the Minnesota Wild as the result of a trade on June 29, 2022, that sent Kevin Fiala to Los Angeles in exchange for Brock Faber and this pick.
7. The Boston Bruins' first-round pick went to the Anaheim Ducks as the result of a trade on March 19, 2022, that sent Hampus Lindholm and Kodie Curran to Boston in exchange for Urho Vaakanainen, John Moore, a second-round pick in both 2023 and 2024 and this pick.
8. The Toronto Maple Leafs' first-round pick went to the Chicago Blackhawks as the result of a trade on July 7, 2022, that sent a second-round pick in 2022 (38th overall) to Toronto in exchange for Petr Mrazek and this pick.
9. The Calgary Flames' first-round pick went to the Montreal Canadiens as the result of a trade on February 14, 2022, that sent Tyler Toffoli to Calgary in exchange for Tyler Pitlick, Emil Heineman, a fifth-round pick in 2023, a conditional fourth-round pick in 2024 and this pick (being conditional at the time of the trade). The condition – Montreal will receive a first-round pick in 2022 if Calgary's first-round pick is outside of the top ten selections – was converted when the Flames qualified for the 2022 Stanley Cup playoffs on April 16, 2022.
10. The Carolina Hurricanes' first-round pick went to the San Jose Sharks as the result of a trade on July 7, 2022, that sent a first-round pick in 2022 (11th overall) to Arizona in exchange for a second-round pick in 2022 (34th overall), the Islanders' second-round pick in 2022 (45th overall) and this pick.
  Arizona previously acquired this pick as the result of a trade on September 4, 2021, that sent Christian Dvorak to Montreal in exchange for a second-round pick in 2024 and this pick (being conditional at the time of the trade). The conditions – Arizona will receive the lower of Carolina or Montreal's first-round picks in 2022, if either or both of the selections are in the top ten picks – were converted when Carolina's first-round pick could no longer be in the top ten selections after they qualified for the 2022 Stanley Cup playoffs on April 7, 2022, and when Montreal could finish no better than twenty-fifth overall ensuring that their first-round pick would be in the top ten selections on April 14, 2022.
  Montreal previously acquired this pick as compensation for not matching an offer sheet from Carolina to restricted free agent Jesperi Kotkaniemi on September 4, 2021.
11. The Florida Panthers' first-round pick went to the Buffalo Sabres as the result of a trade on July 24, 2021, that sent Sam Reinhart to Florida in exchange for Devon Levi and this pick (being conditional at the time of the trade). The condition – Buffalo will receive a first-round pick in 2022 if Florida's first-round pick is outside of the top ten selections – was converted when the Panthers qualified for the 2022 Stanley Cup playoffs on April 3, 2022.
12. The Edmonton Oilers' first-round pick went to the Arizona Coyotes as the result of a trade on July 7, 2022, that sent Colorado's first-round pick in 2022 (32nd overall) to Edmonton in exchange for Zack Kassian, a third-round pick in 2024, a second-round pick in 2025 and this pick.
13. The New York Rangers' first-round pick went to the Winnipeg Jets as the result of a trade on March 21, 2022, that sent Andrew Copp and a sixth-round pick in 2023 to New York in exchange for Morgan Barron, a conditional second-round pick in 2022, a fifth-round pick in 2023 and this pick (being conditional at the time of the trade). The condition – Winnipeg will receive a first-round pick in 2022 if New York advances to the 2022 Eastern Conference Final and Copp plays in 50% of their playoff games – was converted on May 30, 2022.
14. The Colorado Avalanche's first-round pick went to the Edmonton Oilers as the result of a trade on July 7, 2022, that sent Zack Kassian, a first-round pick in 2022 (29th overall), a third-round pick in 2024 and a second-round pick in 2025 to Arizona in exchange for this pick.
  Arizona previously acquired this pick as the result of a trade on July 28, 2021, that sent Darcy Kuemper to Colorado in exchange for Conor Timmins, a conditional third-round pick in 2024 and this pick.

=== Round two ===
Ryan Chesley was selected 37th overall by the Washington Capitals.

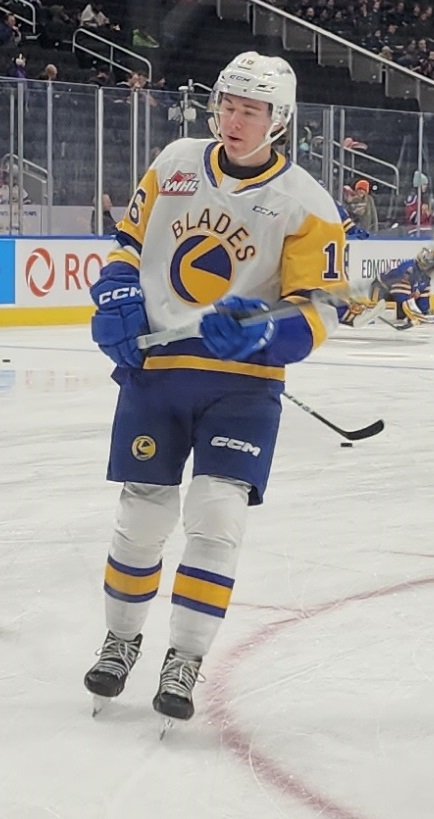
Fraser Minten was selected 38th overall by the Toronto Maple Leafs.

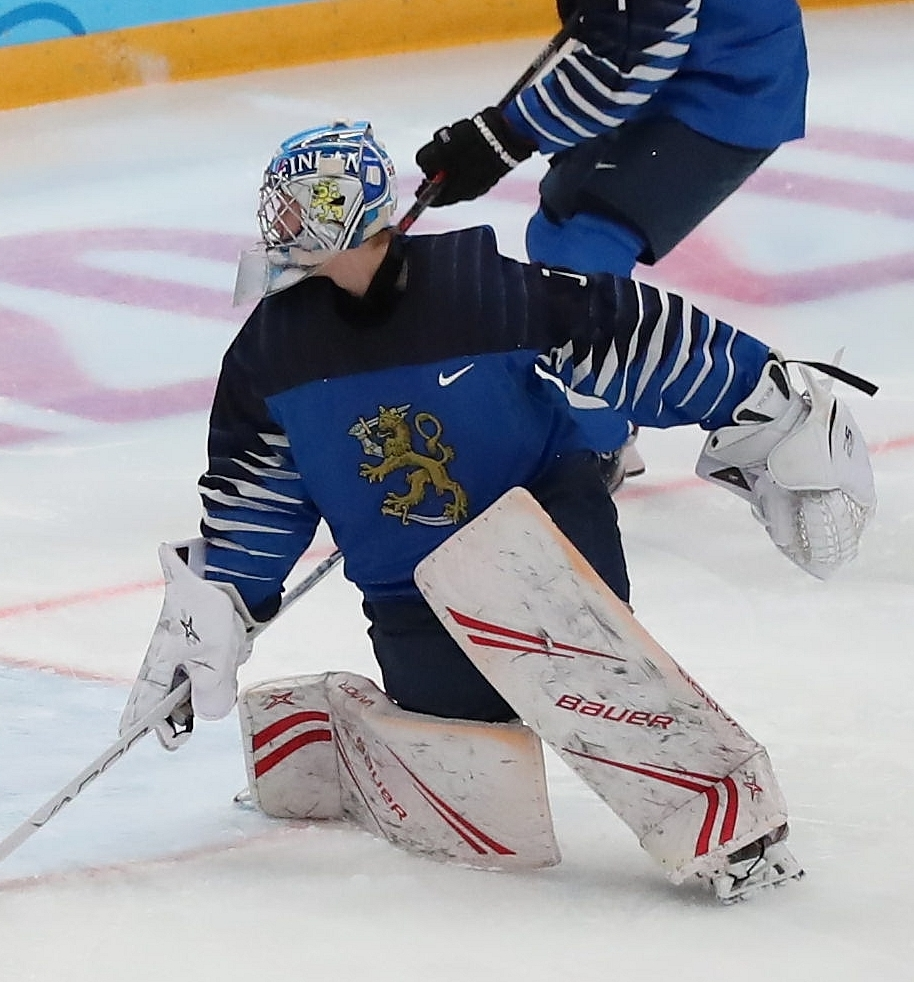
Topias Leinonen was selected 41st overall by the Buffalo Sabres.

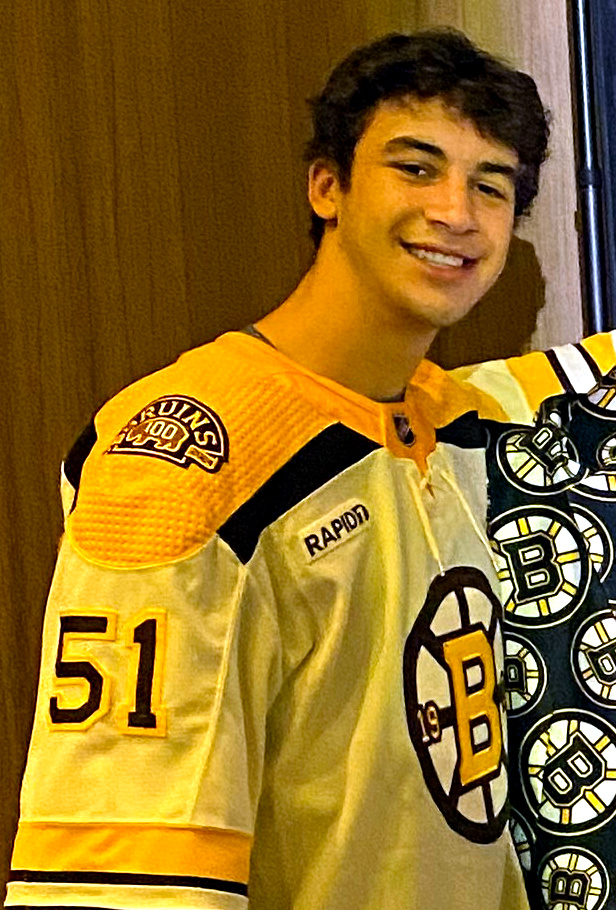
Matt Poitras was selected 54th overall by the Boston Bruins.

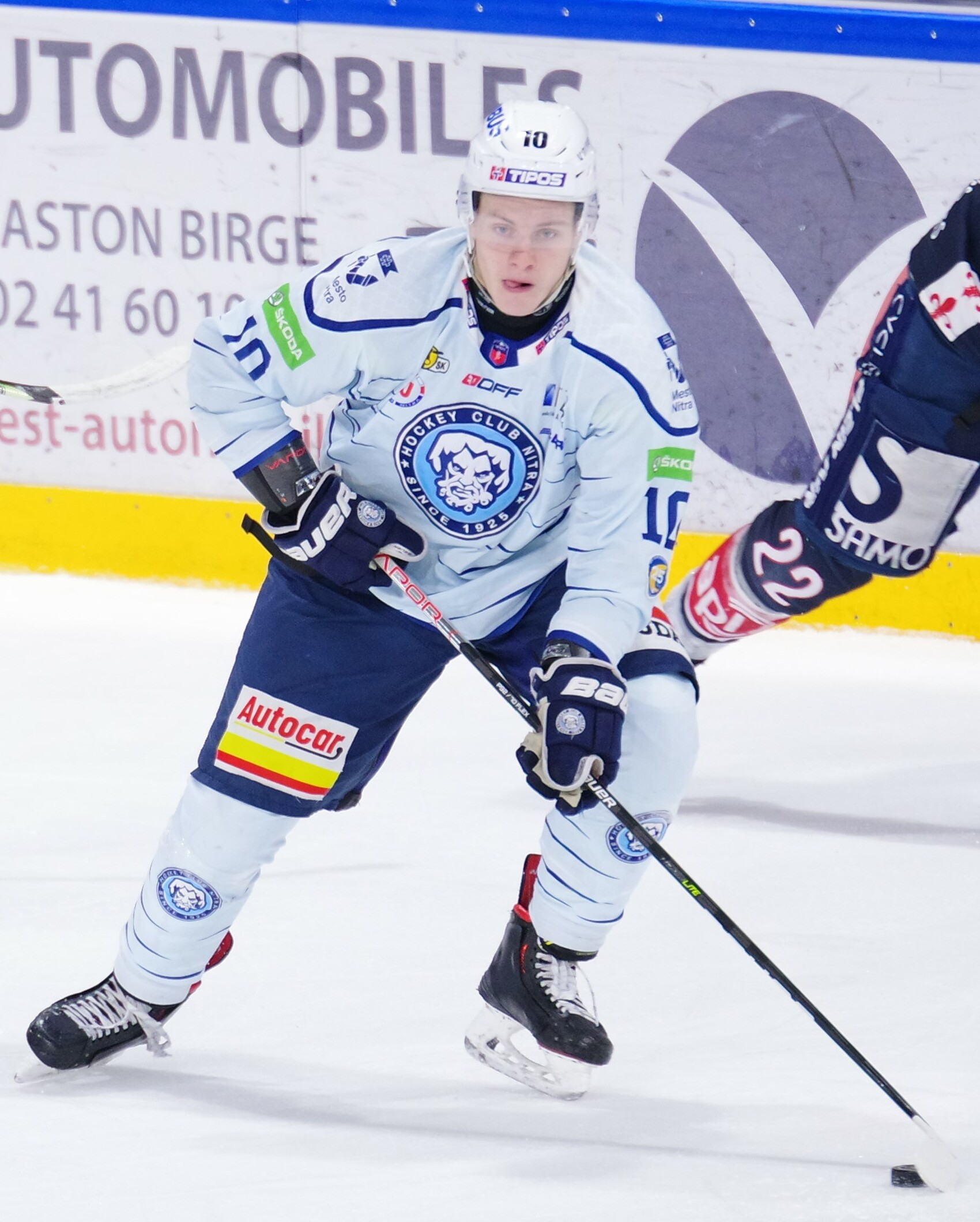
Adam Sykora was selected 63rd overall by the New York Rangers.

#	Player	Nationality	NHL team	College/junior/club team
33	Owen Beck (C)	Canada	Montreal Canadiens	Mississauga Steelheads (OHL)
34	Cameron Lund (C)	United States	San Jose Sharks (from Arizona)^{1}	Green Bay Gamblers (USHL)
35	Jagger Firkus (RW)	Canada	Seattle Kraken	Moose Jaw Warriors (WHL)
36	Artem Duda (D)	Russia	Arizona Coyotes (from Philadelphia)^{2}	Krasnaya Armiya Moskva (MHL)
37	Ryan Chesley (D)	United States	Washington Capitals (from New Jersey)^{3}	U.S. NTDP (USHL)
38	Fraser Minten (C)	Canada	Toronto Maple Leafs (from Chicago)^{4}	Kamloops Blazers (WHL)
39	Paul Ludwinski (C)	Canada	Chicago Blackhawks (from Ottawa)^{5}	Kingston Frontenacs (OHL)
40	Dylan James (LW)	Canada	Detroit Red Wings	Sioux City Musketeers (USHL)
41	Topias Leinonen (G)	Finland	Buffalo Sabres	JYP (Liiga)
42	Noah Warren (D)	Canada	Anaheim Ducks	Gatineau Olympiques (QMJHL)
43	Julian Lutz (LW)	Germany	Arizona Coyotes (from San Jose)^{6}	EHC Red Bull München (DEL)
44	Luca Del Bel Belluz (C)	Canada	Columbus Blue Jackets	Mississauga Steelheads (OHL)
45	Mattias Havelid (D)	Sweden	San Jose Sharks (from NY Islanders via Arizona)^{7}	Linkoping HC (SHL)
46	Seamus Casey (D)	United States	New Jersey Devils (from Winnipeg via Washington)^{8}	U.S. NTDP (USHL)
47	Hunter Haight (C)	Canada	Minnesota Wild (from Vancouver via Arizona)^{9}	Barrie Colts (OHL)
48	Matyas Sapovaliv (C)	Czech Republic	Vegas Golden Knights	Saginaw Spirit (OHL)
49	Jani Nyman (RW)	Finland	Seattle Kraken (from Nashville)^{10}	Ilves (Liiga)
50	Christian Kyrou (D)	Canada	Dallas Stars	Erie Otters (OHL)
51	Jack Hughes (C)	United States	Los Angeles Kings	Northeastern Huskies (Hockey East)
52	Dmitri Buchelnikov (LW)	Russia	Detroit Red Wings (from Washington)^{11}	SKA St. Petersburg 2 (JHL)
53	Tristan Luneau (D)	Canada	Anaheim Ducks (from Pittsburgh)^{12}	Gatineau Olympiques (QMJHL)
54	Matt Poitras (C)	Canada	Boston Bruins	Guelph Storm (OHL)
55	Elias Salomonsson (D)	Sweden	Winnipeg Jets (from St. Louis via NY Rangers)^{13}	Skelleftea AIK (SHL)
56	Rieger Lorenz (LW)	Canada	Minnesota Wild (compensatory)^{14}	Okotoks Oilers (AJHL)
57	Ryan Greene (C)	Canada	Chicago Blackhawks (from Minnesota)^{15}	Green Bay Gamblers (USHL)
58	Nikke Kokko (G)	Finland	Seattle Kraken (from Toronto)^{16}	Karpat U20 (U20 SM-sarja)
59	Topi Ronni (C)	Finland	Calgary Flames	Tappara U20 (U20 SM-sarja)
60	Gleb Trikozov (LW)	Russia	Carolina Hurricanes	Omsk 2 (JHL)
61	David Goyette (C)	Canada	Seattle Kraken (from Florida via Calgary)^{17}	Sudbury Wolves (OHL)
62	Lane Hutson (D)	United States	Montreal Canadiens (from Edmonton)^{18}	U.S. NTDP (USHL)
63	Adam Sykora (LW)	Slovakia	New York Rangers	HK Nitra (Slovakia)
64	Filip Nordberg (D)	Sweden	Ottawa Senators (from Tampa Bay)^{19}	Sodertalje SK (HockeyAllsvenskan)
65	Calle Odelius (D)	Sweden	New York Islanders (from Colorado)^{20}	Djurgardens IF (SHL)

Notes

1. The Arizona Coyotes' second-round pick went to the San Jose Sharks as the result of a trade on July 7, 2022, that sent a first-round pick in 2022 (11th overall) to Arizona in exchange for Carolina's first-round pick in 2022 (27th overall), the Islanders' second-round pick in 2022 (45th overall) and this pick.
2. The Philadelphia Flyers' second-round pick went to the Arizona Coyotes as the result of a trade on July 22, 2021, that sent future considerations to Philadelphia in exchange for Shayne Gostisbehere, St. Louis' seventh-round pick in 2022 and this pick.
3. The New Jersey Devils' second-round pick went to the Washington Capitals as the result of a trade on July 8, 2022, that sent Vitek Vanecek and Winnipeg's second-round pick in 2022 (46th overall) to New Jersey in exchange for a third-round pick in 2022 (70th overall) and this pick.
4. The Chicago Blackhawks' second-round pick went to the Toronto Maple Leafs as the result of a trade on July 7, 2022, that sent a first-round pick in 2022 (25th overall) to Chicago in exchange for Petr Mrazek and this pick.
5. The Ottawa Senators' second-round pick went to the Chicago Blackhawks as the result of a trade on July 7, 2022, that sent Alex DeBrincat to Ottawa in exchange for a first-round pick in 2022, a third-round pick in 2024 and this pick.
6. The San Jose Sharks' second-round pick went to the Arizona Coyotes as the result of a trade on July 17, 2021, that sent Adin Hill and a seventh-round pick in 2022 to San Jose in exchange for Josef Korenar and this pick.
7. The New York Islanders' second-round pick went to the San Jose Sharks as the result of a trade on July 7, 2022, that sent a first-round pick in 2022 (11th overall) to Arizona in exchange for Carolina's first-round pick in 2022 (27th overall), a second-round pick in 2022 (34th overall) and this pick.
  Arizona previously acquired this pick as the result of a trade on July 17, 2021, that sent future considerations to New York in exchange for Andrew Ladd, Colorado's second-round pick in 2021, a conditional third-round pick in 2023 and this pick (being conditional at the time of the trade). The condition – Arizona will receive the better of Colorado or the Islanders' second-round picks in 2022. – was converted when the Avalanche qualified for the 2022 Stanley Cup playoffs on April 5, 2022, and when the Islanders were eliminated from the playoffs on April 17, 2022.
8. The Winnipeg Jets' second-round pick went to the New Jersey Devils as the result of a trade on July 8, 2022, that sent a second and third-round pick in 2022 (37th and 70th overall) to Washington in exchange for Vitek Vanecek and this pick.
  Washington previously acquired this pick as the result of a trade on July 26, 2021, that sent Brenden Dillon to Winnipeg in exchange for a second-round pick in 2023 and this pick.
9. The Vancouver Canucks' second-round pick went to the Minnesota Wild as the result of a trade on March 21, 2022, that sent Jack McBain to Arizona in exchange for this pick.
  Arizona previously acquired this pick as the result of a trade on July 23, 2021, that sent Oliver Ekman-Larsson and Conor Garland to Vancouver in exchange for Jay Beagle, Loui Eriksson, Antoine Roussel, a first-round pick in 2021, a seventh-round pick in 2023 and this pick.
10. The Nashville Predators' second-round pick went to the Seattle Kraken as the result of a trade on March 20, 2022, that sent Jeremy Lauzon to Nashville in exchange for this pick.
11. The Washington Capitals' second-round pick went to the Detroit Red Wings as the result of a trade on April 12, 2021, that sent Anthony Mantha to Washington in exchange for Richard Panik, Jakub Vrana, a first-round pick in 2021 and this pick.
12. The Pittsburgh Penguins' second-round pick went to the Anaheim Ducks as the result of a trade on March 21, 2022, that sent Rickard Rakell to Pittsburgh in exchange for Zach Aston-Reese, Dominik Simon, Calle Clang and this pick.
13. The St. Louis Blues' second-round pick went to the Winnipeg Jets as the result of a trade on March 21, 2022, that sent Andrew Copp and a sixth-round pick in 2023 to New York in exchange for Morgan Barron, a conditional first-round pick in 2022, a fifth-round pick in 2023 and this pick (being conditional at the time of the trade). The condition – Winnipeg will receive the Blues' second-round pick in 2022 or a second-round pick in 2023, at Winnipeg's choice – was converted when the Jets decided to receive this second-round pick in 2022.
  The Rangers previously acquired this pick as the result of a trade on July 23, 2021, that sent Pavel Buchnevich to St. Louis in exchange for Samuel Blais and this pick.
14. The Minnesota Wild received the 24th pick of this round (56th overall) as compensation for not signing their 2018 first-round selection Filip Johansson.
15. The Minnesota Wild's second-round pick went to the Chicago Blackhawks as the result of a trade on March 21, 2022, that sent Marc-Andre Fleury to Minnesota in exchange for this pick (being conditional at the time of the trade). The condition – Chicago will receive a second-round pick in 2022 if Fleury does not win at least four playoff games and Minnesota fails to advance to the 2022 Western Conference Final – was converted when the Wild were eliminated from the 2022 Stanley Cup playoffs on May 12, 2022.
16. The Toronto Maple Leafs' second-round pick went to the Seattle Kraken as the result of a trade on March 20, 2022, that sent Mark Giordano and Colin Blackwell to Toronto in exchange for a second-round pick in 2023, a third-round pick in 2024 and this pick.
17. The Florida Panthers' second-round pick went to the Seattle Kraken as the result of a trade on March 16, 2022, that sent Calle Jarnkrok to Calgary in exchange for a third-round pick in 2023, a seventh-round pick in 2024 and this pick.
  Calgary previously acquired this pick as the result of a trade April 12, 2021, that sent Sam Bennett and a sixth-round pick in 2022 to Florida in exchange for Emil Heineman and this pick.
18. The Edmonton Oilers' second-round pick went to the Montreal Canadiens as the result of a trade on March 21, 2022, that sent Brett Kulak to Edmonton in exchange for William Lagesson, a seventh-round pick in 2024 and this pick (being conditional at the time of the trade). The condition – Montreal will receive a second-round pick in 2022 if Edmonton does not qualify for the 2022 Stanley Cup Finals – was converted on June 6, 2022.
19. The Tampa Bay Lightning's second-round pick went to the Ottawa Senators as the result of a trade on December 27, 2020, that sent Marian Gaborik and Anders Nilsson to Tampa Bay in exchange for Braydon Coburn, Cedric Paquette and this pick.
20. The Colorado Avalanche's second-round pick went to the New York Islanders as the result of a trade on October 12, 2020, that sent Devon Toews to Colorado in exchange for a second-round pick in 2021 and this pick.

=== Round three ===
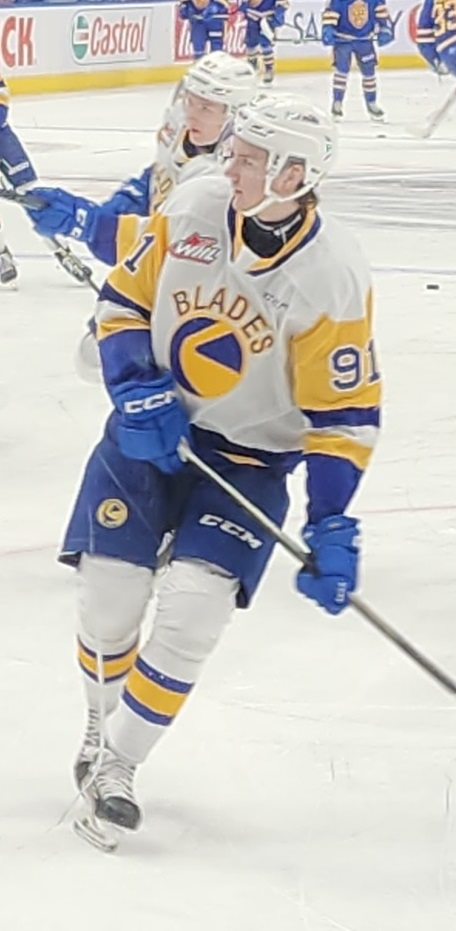
Alexander Suzdalev was selected 70th overall by the Washington Capitals.

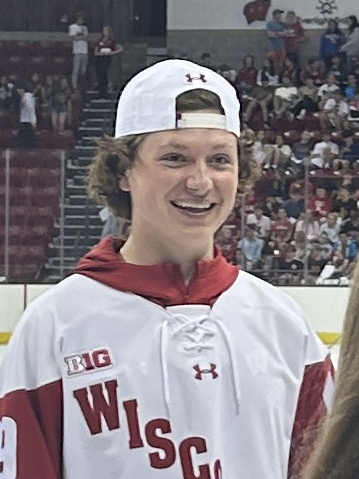
Quinn Finley was selected 78th overall by the New York Islanders.

#	Player	Nationality	NHL team	College/junior/club team
66	Gavin Hayes (LW)	United States	Chicago Blackhawks (from Montreal)^{1}	Flint Firebirds (OHL)
67	Miko Matikka (RW)	Finland	Arizona Coyotes	Jokerit U20 (U20 SM-sarja)
68	Ty Nelson (D)	Canada	Seattle Kraken	North Bay Battalion (OHL)
69	Devin Kaplan (RW)	United States	Philadelphia Flyers	U.S. NTDP (USHL)
70	Alexander Suzdalev (LW)	Sweden	Washington Capitals (from New Jersey)^{2}	HV71 U20 (J20 Nationell)
71	Alexander Perevalov (LW)	Russia	Carolina Hurricanes (from Chicago)^{3}	Lokomotiv Yaroslavl (KHL)
72	Oskar Pettersson (RW)	Sweden	Ottawa Senators	Rogle J20 (J20 Nationell)
73	Aleksanteri Kaskimaki (C)	Finland	St. Louis Blues (from Detroit)^{4}	HIFK U20 (U20 SM-sarja)
74	Viktor Neuchev (LW)	Russia	Buffalo Sabres	JHC Avto (MHL)
75	Vinzenz Rohrer (C)	Austria	Montreal Canadiens (from Anaheim)^{5}	Ottawa 67's (OHL)
76	Michael Fischer (D)	United States	San Jose Sharks	St. Mark's School (USHS-MA)
77	Danny Zhilkin (C)	Canada	Winnipeg Jets (from Columbus)^{6}	Guelph Storm (OHL)
78	Quinn Finley (LW)	United States	New York Islanders	Madison Capitols (USHL)
79	Jordan Gustafson (C)	Canada	Vegas Golden Knights (from Winnipeg via Vancouver and Toronto)^{7}	Seattle Thunderbirds (WHL)
80	Elias Pettersson (D)	Sweden	Vancouver Canucks (from Vancouver via Vegas and Ottawa)^{8}	Orebro HK J20 (J20 Nationell)
81	Samuel Savoie (LW)	Canada	Chicago Blackhawks (from Vegas)^{9}	Gatineau Olympiques (QMJHL)
82	Adam Ingram (C)	Canada	Nashville Predators	Youngstown Phantoms (USHL)
83	George Fegaras (D)	Canada	Dallas Stars	North York Rangers (OJHL)
84	Kasper Kulonummi (D)	Finland	Nashville Predators (from Los Angeles)^{10}	Jokerit U20 (U20 SM-sarja)
85	Ludwig Persson (LW)	Sweden	Washington Capitals	Frolunda HC (SHL)
86	Lucas Edmonds (RW)	Sweden	Tampa Bay Lightning (from Pittsburgh via Los Angeles)^{11}	Kingston Frontenacs (OHL)
87	Tomas Hamara (D)	Czech Republic	Ottawa Senators (from Boston)^{12}	Tappara U20 (U20 SM-sarja)
88	Michael Buchinger (D)	Canada	St. Louis Blues	Guelph Storm (OHL)
89	Mikey Milne (LW)	Canada	Minnesota Wild	Winnipeg Ice (WHL)
90	Aidan Thompson (C)	United States	Chicago Blackhawks (from Toronto via Calgary)^{13}	Lincoln Stars (USHL)
91	Ben MacDonald (C)	United States	Seattle Kraken (from Calgary via Boston)^{14}	Noble & Greenough School (USHS-MA)
92	Adam Engstrom (D)	Sweden	Montreal Canadiens (from Carolina)^{15}	Djurgardens IF (SHL)
93	Marek Alscher (D)	Czech Republic	Florida Panthers	Portland Winterhawks (WHL)
94	Jeremy Langlois (D)	Canada	Arizona Coyotes (from Edmonton via Chicago)^{16}	Cape Breton Eagles (QMJHL)
95	Nicholas Moldenhauer (RW)	Canada	Toronto Maple Leafs (from NY Rangers via Vegas)^{17}	Chicago Steel (USHL)
96	Jordan Dumais (RW)	Canada	Columbus Blue Jackets (from Tampa Bay)^{18}	Halifax Mooseheads (QMJHL)
97	Bryce McConnell-Barker (C)	Canada	New York Rangers (from Colorado)^{19}	Sault Ste. Marie Greyhounds (OHL)

Notes

1. The Montreal Canadiens' third-round pick went to the Chicago Blackhawks as the result of a trade on July 7, 2022, that sent Kirby Dach to Montreal in exchange for the Islanders' first-round pick in 2022 (13th overall) and this pick.
2. The New Jersey Devils' third-round pick went to the Washington Capitals as the result of a trade on July 8, 2022, that sent Vitek Vanecek and Winnipeg's second-round pick in 2022 (46th overall) to New Jersey in exchange for a second-round pick in 2022 (37th overall) and this pick.
3. The Chicago Blackhawks' third-round pick went to the Carolina Hurricanes as the result of a trade on July 24, 2021, that sent a third-round pick in 2021 to Chicago in exchange for this pick.
4. The Detroit Red Wings' third-round pick went to the St. Louis Blues as the result of a trade on July 8, 2022, that sent Ville Husso to Detroit in exchange for this pick.
5. The Anaheim Ducks' third-round pick went to the Montreal Canadiens as the result of a trade on July 24, 2021, that sent Chicago's third-round pick in 2021 (76th overall) to Anaheim in exchange for this pick.
6. The Columbus Blue Jackets' third-round pick went to the Winnipeg Jets as the result of a trade on January 23, 2021, that sent Patrik Laine and Jack Roslovic to Columbus in exchange for Pierre-Luc Dubois and this pick.
7. The Winnipeg Jets' third-round pick went to the Vegas Golden Knights as the result of a trade on July 8, 2022, that sent the Rangers' third-round pick and Chicago's fifth-round pick both in 2022 (95th and 135th overall) to Toronto in exchange for this pick.
  Toronto previously acquired this pick as the result of a trade on March 20, 2022, that sent Travis Dermott to Vancouver in exchange for this pick.
  Vancouver previously acquired this pick as the result of a trade on July 27, 2021, that sent Nate Schmidt to Winnipeg in exchange for this pick.
8. The Vancouver Canucks' third-round pick was re-acquired as the result of a trade on March 20, 2022, that sent Travis Hamonic to Ottawa in exchange for this pick.
  Ottawa previously acquired this pick as the result of a trade July 28, 2021, that sent Evgenii Dadonov to Vegas in exchange for Nick Holden and this pick.
  Vegas previously acquired this pick as the result of a trade on October 12, 2020, that sent Nate Schmidt to Vancouver in exchange for this pick.
9. The Vegas Golden Knights' third-round pick went to the Chicago Blackhawks as the result of a trade on April 12, 2021, that sent Nick DeSimone and a fifth-round pick in 2022 to Vegas in exchange for a second-round pick 2021 and this pick.
10. The Los Angeles Kings' third-round pick went to the Nashville Predators as the result of a trade on July 1, 2021, that sent Viktor Arvidsson to Los Angeles in exchange for a second-round pick in 2021 and this pick.
11. The Pittsburgh Penguins' third-round pick went to the Tampa Bay Lightning as the result of a trade on July 8, 2022, that sent Chicago's fourth-round pick and Detroit's sixth-round pick both in 2022 (103rd and 169th overall) to Los Angeles in exchange for this pick.
  Los Angeles previously acquired this pick as the result of a trade on April 12, 2021, that sent Jeff Carter to Pittsburgh in exchange for a conditional fourth-round pick in 2023 and this pick (being conditional at the time of the trade). The condition – Los Angeles will receive a third-round pick in 2022 if the Penguins do not advance to the 2021 Stanley Cup Finals – was converted when the Penguins were eliminated from the playoffs on May 26, 2021.
12. The Boston Bruins' third-round pick went to the Ottawa Senators as the result of a trade on April 11, 2021, that sent Mike Reilly to Boston in exchange for this pick.
13. The Toronto Maple Leafs' third-round pick went to the Chicago Blackhawks as the result of a trade on July 28, 2021, that sent Nikita Zadorov to Calgary in exchange for this pick.
  Calgary previously acquired this pick as the result of a trade on April 11, 2021, that sent David Rittich to Toronto in exchange for this pick.
14. The Calgary Flames' third-round pick went to the Seattle Kraken as the result of a trade on July 8, 2022, that sent Washington's fourth-round pick in 2022 (117th overall) and a fifth-round pick in 2022 (132nd overall) to Boston in exchange for this pick.
  Boston previously acquired this pick as the result of a trade on July 28, 2021, that sent Daniel Vladar to Calgary in exchange for this pick.
15. The Carolina Hurricanes' third-round pick went to the Montreal Canadiens as compensation for not matching an offer sheet from Carolina to restricted free agent Jesperi Kotkaniemi on September 4, 2021.
16. The Edmonton Oilers' third-round pick went to the Arizona Coyotes as the result of a trade on July 8, 2022, that sent Dallas' third-round pick in 2023 to Chicago in exchange for this pick.
  Chicago previously acquired this pick as the result of a trade on July 12, 2021, that sent Duncan Keith and Tim Soderlund to Edmonton in exchange for Caleb Jones and this pick (being conditional at the time of the trade). The condition – Chicago will receive a third-round pick in 2022 if Edmonton does not qualify for the 2022 Stanley Cup Finals – was converted on June 6, 2022.
17. The New York Rangers' third-round pick went to the Toronto Maple Leafs as the result of a trade on July 8, 2022, that sent Winnipeg's third-round pick in 2022 (79th overall) to Vegas in exchange for Chicago's fifth-round pick in 2022 (135th overall) and this pick.
  Vegas previously acquired this pick as the result of a trade on July 29, 2021, that sent Ryan Reaves to New York in exchange for this pick.
18. The Tampa Bay Lightning's third-round pick went to the Columbus Blue Jackets as the result of a trade on April 10, 2021, that sent David Savard to Tampa Bay in exchange for a first-round pick in 2021 and this pick.
19. The Colorado Avalanche's third-round pick went to the New York Rangers as the result of a trade on July 7, 2022, that sent Alexandar Georgiev to Colorado in exchange for a third-round pick in 2023, a fifth-round pick in 2022 and this pick.

=== Round four ===
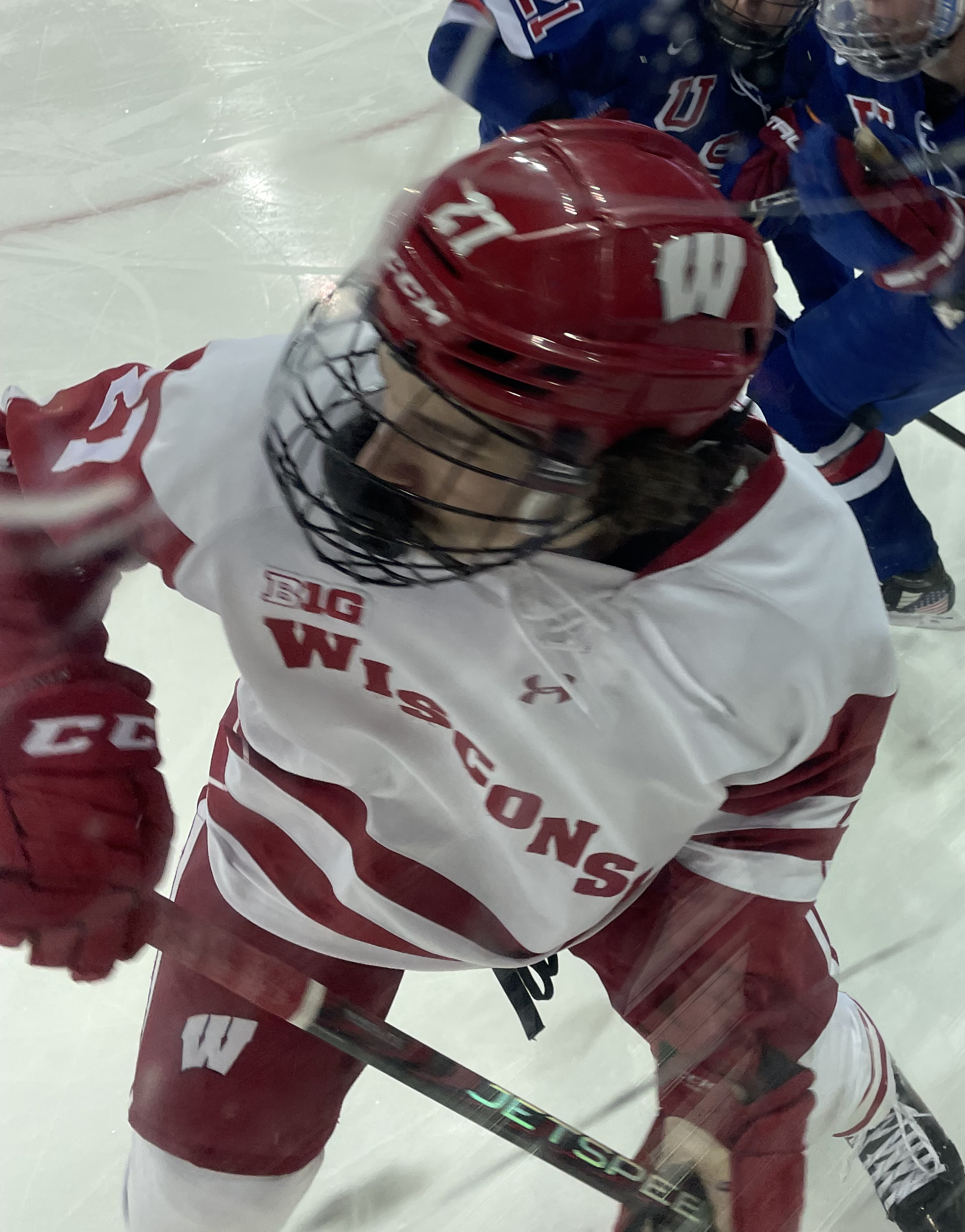
Tyson Jugnauth was selected 100th overall by the Seattle Kraken.

Stephen Halliday was selected 104th overall by the Ottawa Senators.

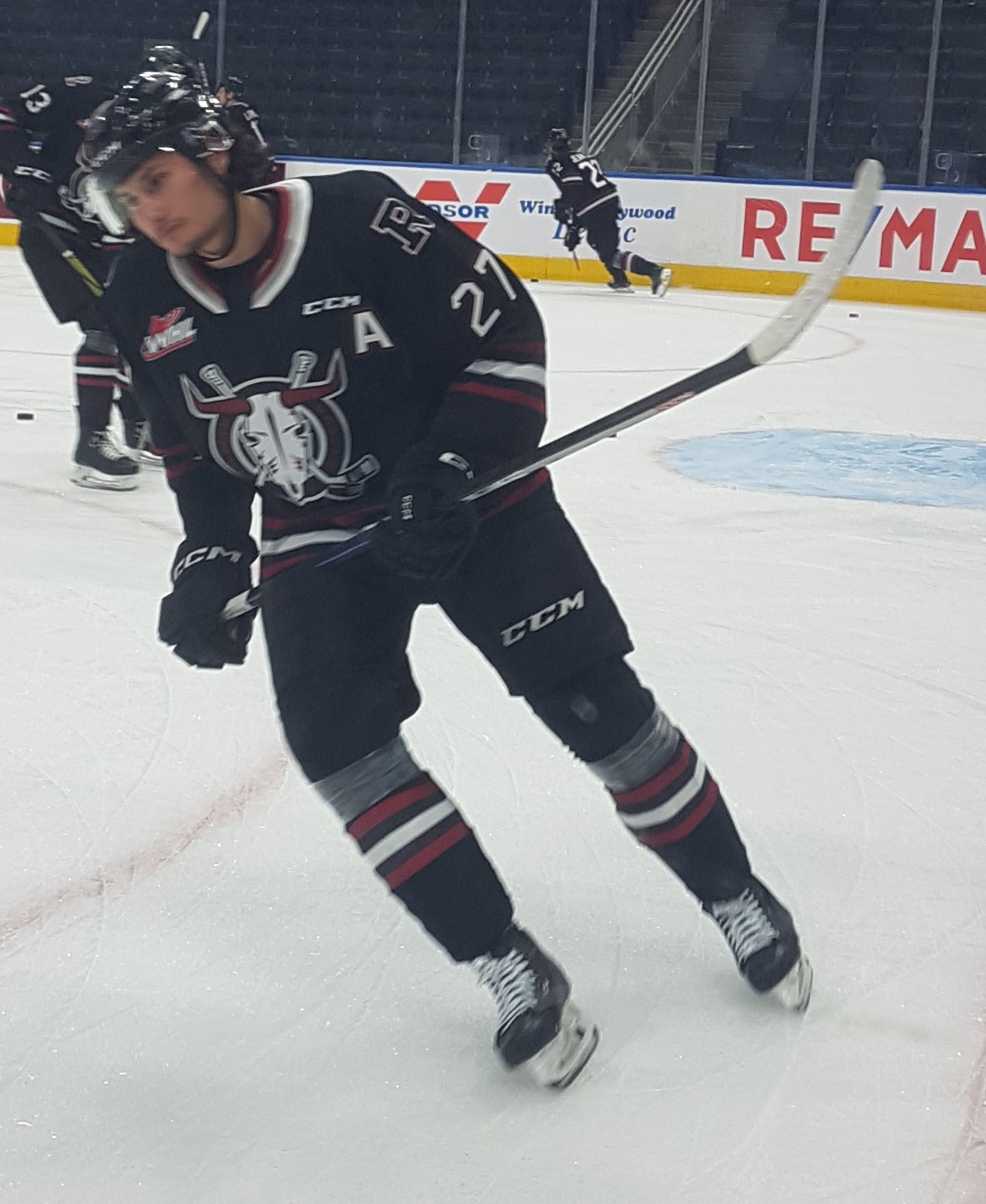
Mats Lindgren was selected 106th overall by the Buffalo Sabres.

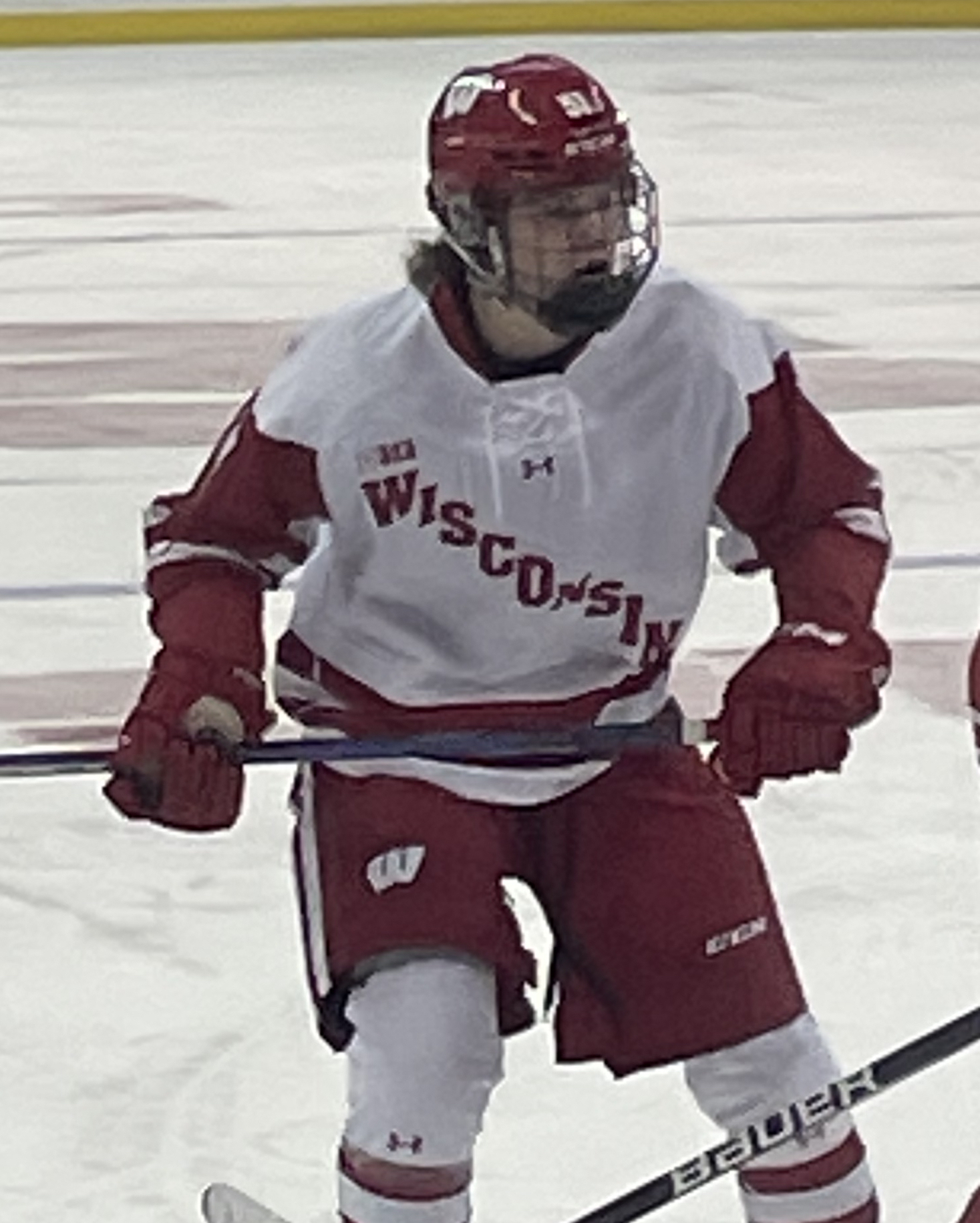
Cruz Lucius was selected 124th overall by the Carolina Hurricanes.

#	Player	Nationality	NHL team	College/junior/club team
98	Isaiah George (D)	Canada	New York Islanders (from Montreal)^{1}	London Knights (OHL)
99	Garrett Brown (D)	United States	Winnipeg Jets (from Arizona)^{2}	Sioux City Musketeers (USHL)
100	Tyson Jugnauth (D)	Canada	Seattle Kraken	West Kelowna Warriors (BCHL)
101	Simon Forsmark (D)	Sweden	Carolina Hurricanes (from Philadelphia)^{3}	Orebro HK (SHL)
102	Tyler Brennan (G)	Canada	New Jersey Devils	Prince George Cougars (WHL)
103	Kenny Connors (C)	United States	Los Angeles Kings (from Chicago via Tampa Bay)^{4}	Dubuque Fighting Saints (USHL)
104	Stephen Halliday (C)	Canada	Ottawa Senators	Dubuque Fighting Saints (USHL)
105	Anton Johansson (D)	Sweden	Detroit Red Wings	Leksands IF (SHL)
106	Mats Lindgren (D)	Canada	Buffalo Sabres	Kamloops Blazers (WHL)
107	Benjamin King (C)	Canada	Anaheim Ducks	Red Deer Rebels (WHL)
108	Mason Beaupit (G)	Canada	San Jose Sharks	Spokane Chiefs (WHL)
109	Kirill Dolzhenkov (RW)	Russia	Columbus Blue Jackets	Krasnaya Armiya (MHL)
110	Daniil Orlov (D)	Russia	New Jersey Devils (from NY Islanders)^{5}	Sakhalinskiye Akuly (MHL)
111	Noah Laba (C)	United States	New York Rangers (from Winnipeg via Vegas)^{6}	Lincoln Stars (USHL)
112	Daimon Gardner (C)	Canada	Vancouver Canucks	Warroad High (USHS-MN)
113	Amadeus Lombardi (C)	Canada	Detroit Red Wings (from Vegas)^{7}	Flint Firebirds (OHL)
114	Cole O'Hara (RW)	Canada	Nashville Predators	Tri-City Storm (USHL)
115	Gavin White (D)	Canada	Dallas Stars	Hamilton Bulldogs (OHL)
116	Angus Booth (D)	Canada	Los Angeles Kings	Shawinigan Cataractes (QMJHL)
117	Cole Spicer (C)	United States	Boston Bruins (from Washington via Seattle)^{8}	U.S. NDTP (USHL)
118	Sergei Murashov (G)	Russia	Pittsburgh Penguins	Yaroslavl (MHL)
119	Dans Locmelis (C)	Latvia	Boston Bruins	Lulea HF J20 (J20 Nationell)
120	Arseni Koromyslov (D)	Russia	St. Louis Blues	SKA St. Petersburg (MHL)
121	Ryan Healey (D)	United States	Minnesota Wild	Sioux Falls Stampede (USHL)
122	Dennis Hildeby (G)	Sweden	Toronto Maple Leafs (from Toronto via Columbus and Nashville)^{9}	Farjestad BK (SHL)
123	Tucker Robertson (C)	Canada	Seattle Kraken (from Calgary)^{10}	Peterborough Petes (OHL)
124	Cruz Lucius (RW)	United States	Carolina Hurricanes	U.S. NDTP (USHL)
125	Ludvig Jansson (D)	Sweden	Florida Panthers	Sodertalje SK (HockeyAllsvenskan)
126	Charlie Leddy (D)	United States	New Jersey Devils (from Edmonton)^{11}	U.S. NDTP (USHL)
127	Cedrick Guindon (LW)	Canada	Montreal Canadiens (from NY Rangers via Florida)^{12}	Owen Sound Attack (OHL)
128	Cameron Whitehead (G)	Canada	Vegas Golden Knights (from Tampa Bay via Montreal)^{13}	Lincoln Stars (USHL)
129	Maximilian Kilpinen (LW)	Sweden	Detroit Red Wings (from Colorado)^{14}	Orebro HK J20 (J20 Nationell)

Notes

1. The Montreal Canadiens' fourth-round pick went to the New York Islanders as the result of a trade on July 7, 2022, that sent a first-round pick in 2022 (13th overall) to Montreal in exchange for Alexander Romanov and this pick.
2. The Arizona Coyotes' fourth-round pick went to the Winnipeg Jets as the result of a trade on March 21, 2022, that sent Bryan Little and Nathan Smith to Arizona in exchange for this pick.
3. The Philadelphia Flyers' fourth-round pick went to the Carolina Hurricanes as the result of a trade on July 8, 2022, that sent Tony DeAngelo and a seventh-round pick in 2022 (220th overall) to Philadelphia in exchange for a conditional third-round pick in 2023, a second-round pick in 2024 and this pick.
4. The Chicago Blackhawks' fourth-round pick went to the Los Angeles Kings as the result of a trade on July 8, 2022, that sent Pittsburgh's third-round pick in 2022 (86th overall) to Tampa Bay in exchange for Detroit's sixth-round pick in 2022 (169th overall) and this pick.
  Tampa Bay previously acquired this pick as the result of a trade on March 18, 2022, that sent Boris Katchouk, Taylor Raddysh, a conditional first-round pick in 2023 and 2024 to Chicago in exchange for Brandon Hagel, a fourth-round pick in 2024 and this pick.
5. The New York Islanders' fourth-round pick went to the New Jersey Devils as the result of a trade on April 7, 2021, that sent Kyle Palmieri and Travis Zajac to New York in exchange for A. J. Greer, Mason Jobst, a first-round pick in 2021 and this pick (being conditional at the time of the trade). The condition – New Jersey will receive a fourth-round pick in 2022 if the Islanders do not advance to the 2021 Stanley Cup Finals – was converted when the Islanders were eliminated from the 2021 Stanley Cup playoffs on June 25, 2021.
6. The Winnipeg Jets' fourth-round pick went to the New York Rangers as the result of a trade on July 17, 2021, that sent Brett Howden to Vegas in exchange for Nick DeSimone and this pick.
  Vegas previously acquired this pick as the result of a trade on October 9, 2020, that sent Paul Stastny to Winnipeg in exchange for Carl Dahlstrom and this pick (being conditional at the time of the trade). The condition – Vegas will receive a fourth-round pick in 2022 if Stastny plays in five games during the 2020–21 NHL season for Winnipeg – was converted on January 23, 2021.
7. The Vegas Golden Knights' fourth-round pick went to the Detroit Red Wings as the result of a trade on October 7, 2020, that sent a fourth-round pick in 2020 (125th overall) to Vegas in exchange for this pick.
8. The Washington Capitals' fourth-round pick went to the Boston Bruins as the result of a trade on July 8, 2022, that sent Calgary's third-round pick in 2022 (91st overall) to Seattle in exchange for a fifth-round pick in 2022 (132nd overall) and this pick.
  Seattle previously acquired this pick as the result of a trade on March 21, 2022, that sent Marcus Johansson to Washington in exchange for Daniel Sprong, a sixth-round pick in 2023 and this pick.
9. The Toronto Maple Leafs' fourth-round pick was re-acquired as the result of a trade on July 8, 2022, that sent a fourth-round pick in 2023 to Nashville in exchange for this pick.
  Nashville previously acquired this pick as the result of a trade on June 30, 2022, that sent Mathieu Olivier to Columbus in exchange for this pick.
  Columbus previously acquired this pick as the result of a trade on April 11, 2021, that sent Stefan Noesen to Toronto in exchange for a first-round pick in 2021 and this pick.
10. The Calgary Flames' fourth-round pick went to the Seattle Kraken as the result of a trade on July 22, 2021, that sent Tyler Pitlick to Calgary in exchange for this pick.
11. The Edmonton Oilers' fourth-round pick went to the New Jersey Devils as the result of a trade on April 12, 2021, that sent Dmitry Kulikov to Edmonton in exchange for this pick (being conditional at the time of the trade). The condition – New Jersey will receive a fourth-round pick in 2022 if the Oilers do not advance to the Second Round of the 2021 Stanley Cup playoffs – was converted when the Oilers were eliminated from the playoffs on May 24, 2021.
12. The New York Rangers' fourth-round pick went to the Montreal Canadiens as the result of a trade on March 16, 2022, that sent Ben Chiarot to Florida in exchange for Ty Smilanic, a conditional first-round pick in 2023 and this pick being conditional at the time of the trade). The condition – Montreal will receive the lowest of the Rangers' or Jets' fourth-round pick in 2022. – was converted when the Rangers clinched a spot in the 2022 Stanley Cup playoffs on April 9, 2022, and when the Jets were eliminated from the playoffs on April 20, 2022.
  Florida previously acquired this pick as the result of a trade on March 16, 2022, that sent Frank Vatrano to New York in exchange for this conditional pick.
13. The Tampa Bay Lightning's fourth-round pick went to the Vegas Golden Knights as the result of a trade on July 8, 2022, that sent a fourth-round pick in 2023 to Montreal in exchange for this pick.
  Montreal previously acquired this pick as the result of a trade on July 24, 2021, that sent Vegas' fourth-round pick in 2021 (126th overall) to Tampa Bay in exchange for this pick.
14. The Colorado Avalanche's fourth-round pick went to the Detroit Red Wings as the result of a trade on April 9, 2021, that sent Patrik Nemeth to Colorado in exchange for this pick.

=== Round five ===
#	Player	Nationality	NHL team	College/junior/club team
130	Jared Davidson (C)	Canada	Montreal Canadiens	Seattle Thunderbirds (WHL)
131	Matthew Morden (D)	Canada	Arizona Coyotes	St. Andrew's College (CAHS)
132	Frederic Brunet (D)	Canada	Boston Bruins (from Seattle)^{1}	Rimouski Oceanic (QMJHL)
133	Alex Bump (LW)	United States	Philadelphia Flyers	Omaha Lancers (USHL)
134	Vsevolod Komarov (D)	Russia	Buffalo Sabres (from New Jersey)^{2}	Quebec Remparts (QMJHL)
135	Nikita Grebenkin (RW)	Russia	Toronto Maple Leafs (from Chicago via Vegas)^{3}	Stalnye Lisy (MHL)
136	Jorian Donovan (D)	Canada	Ottawa Senators	Hamilton Bulldogs (OHL)
137	Tnias Mathurin (D)	Canada	Detroit Red Wings	North Bay Battalion (OHL)
138	Sergei Ivanov (G)	Russia	Columbus Blue Jackets (from Buffalo via Vegas and San Jose)^{4}	SKA St. Petersburg (MHL)
139	Connor Hvidston (LW)	Canada	Anaheim Ducks	Swift Current Broncos (WHL)
140	Jake Furlong (D)	Canada	San Jose Sharks (from San Jose via Minnesota)^{5}	Halifax Mooseheads (QMJHL)
141	Petr Hauser (RW)	Czech Republic	New Jersey Devils (from Columbus)^{6}	HC Sparta Praha (Czechia U20)
142	Matthew Maggio (RW)	Canada	New York Islanders	Windsor Spitfires (OHL)
143	Cameron O'Neill (RW)	United States	Ottawa Senators (from Winnipeg)^{7}	Mount St. Charles Academy (NEPACK 18U)
144	Ty Young (G)	Canada	Vancouver Canucks	Prince George Cougars (WHL)
145	Patrick Guay (C)	Canada	Vegas Golden Knights	Charlottetown Islanders (QMJHL)
146	Graham Sward (D)	Canada	Nashville Predators	Spokane Chiefs (WHL)
147	Maxim Mayorov (G)	Russia	Dallas Stars	HC Lada Togliatti (MHL)
148	Otto Salin (D)	Finland	Los Angeles Kings	HIFK U20 (U20 SM-sarja)
149	Jake Karabela (C)	Canada	Washington Capitals	Guelph Storm (OHL)
150	Zam Plante (C)	United States	Pittsburgh Penguins	Chicago Steel (USHL)
151	Kevin Reidler (G)	Sweden	Ottawa Senators (from Boston)^{8}	AIK J18 (J20 Nationell)
152	Marc-Andre Gaudet (D)	Canada	St. Louis Blues	Acadie-Bathurst Titan (QMJHL)
153	David Spacek (D)	Czech Republic	Minnesota Wild	Sherbrooke Phoenix (QMJHL)
154	Michael Callow (RW)	United States	Anaheim Ducks (from Toronto)^{9}	St. Sebastian's School (USHS-MA)
155	Parker Bell (LW)	Canada	Calgary Flames	Tri-City Americans (WHL)
156	Vladimir Grudinin (D)	Russia	Carolina Hurricanes	Krasnaya Armiya (MHL)
157	Sandis Vilmanis (LW)	Latvia	Florida Panthers	Lulea-HF J20 (J20 Nationell)
158	Samuel Jonsson (G)	Sweden	Edmonton Oilers	Brynas J20 (J20 Nationell)
159	Victor Mancini (D)	United States	New York Rangers	University of Nebraska-Omaha (NCAA)
160	Nick Malik (G)	Czech Republic	Tampa Bay Lightning	KooKoo (Liiga)
161	Maxim Barbashev (LW)	Russia	New York Rangers (from Colorado)^{10}	Moncton Wildcats (QMJHL)

Notes

1. The Seattle Kraken's fifth-round pick went to the Boston Bruins as the result of a trade on July 8, 2022, that sent Calgary's third-round pick in 2022 (91st overall) to Seattle in exchange for Washington's fourth-round pick in 2022 (117th overall) and this pick.
2. The New Jersey Devils' fifth-round pick went to the Buffalo Sabres as the result of a trade on July 28, 2021, that sent future considerations to New Jersey in exchange for Will Butcher and this pick.
3. The Chicago Blackhawks' fifth-round pick went to the Toronto Maple Leafs as the result of a trade on July 8, 2022, that sent Winnipeg's third-round pick in 2022 (79th overall) to Vegas in exchange for the Rangers' third-round pick in 2022 (95th overall) and this pick.
  Vegas previously acquired this pick as the result of a trade on April 12, 2021, that sent a second-round pick in 2021 and a third-round pick in 2022 to Chicago in exchange for Nick DeSimone and this pick.
4. The Buffalo Sabres' fifth-round pick went to the Columbus Blue Jackets as the result of a trade on July 8, 2022, that sent a fifth-round pick in 2023 to San Jose in exchange for this pick.
  San Jose previously acquired this pick as the result of a trade on April 12, 2021, that sent Mattias Janmark to Vegas in exchange for this pick.
  Vegas previously acquired this pick as the result of a trade on June 28, 2019, that sent Colin Miller to Buffalo in exchange for St. Louis' second-round pick in 2021 and this pick.
5. The San Jose Sharks' fifth-round pick was re-acquired as the result of a trade on March 21, 2022, that sent Jake Middleton to Minnesota in exchange for Kaapo Kahkonen and this pick.
  Minnesota previously acquired this pick as the result of a trade on October 5, 2020, that sent Devan Dubnyk and a seventh-round pick in 2022 to San Jose in exchange for this pick.
6. The Columbus Blue Jackets' fifth-round pick went to the New Jersey Devils as the result of a trade on February 25, 2019, that sent Keith Kinkaid to Columbus in exchange for this pick.
7. The Winnipeg Jets' fifth-round pick went to the Ottawa Senators as the result of a trade on March 21, 2022, that sent Zach Sanford to Winnipeg in exchange for this pick.
8. The Boston Bruins' fifth-round pick went to the Ottawa Senators as the result of a trade on March 21, 2022, that sent Josh Brown and a conditional seventh-round pick in 2022 to Boston in exchange for Zach Senyshyn and this pick.
9. The Toronto Maple Leafs' fifth-round pick went to the Anaheim Ducks as the result of a trade on April 12, 2021, that sent Ben Hutton to Toronto in exchange for this pick.
10. The Colorado Avalanche's fifth-round pick went to the New York Rangers as the result of a trade on July 7, 2022, that sent Alexandar Georgiev to Colorado in exchange for a third-round pick in both 2022 and 2023 and this pick.

=== Round six ===
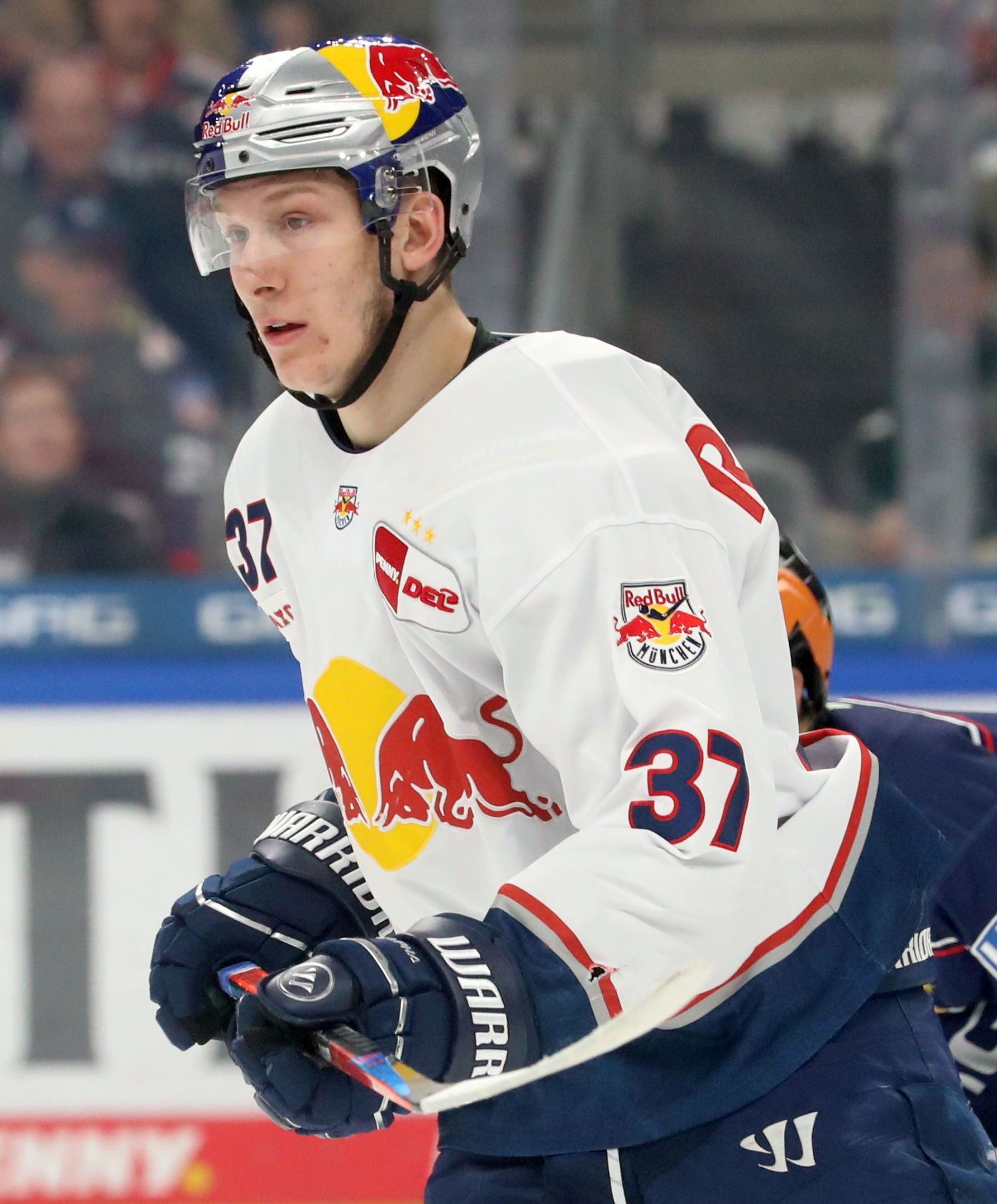
Maksymilian Szuber was selected 163rd overall by the Arizona Coyotes.

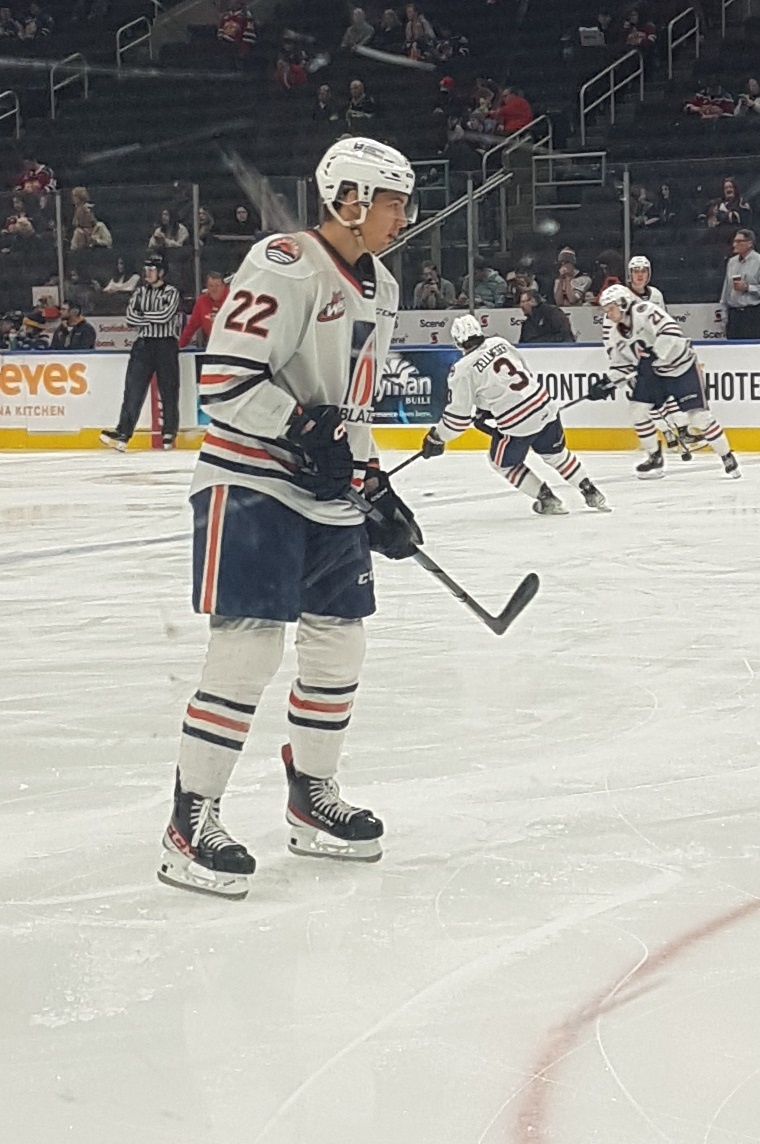
Daylan Kuefler was selected 174th overall by the New York Islanders.

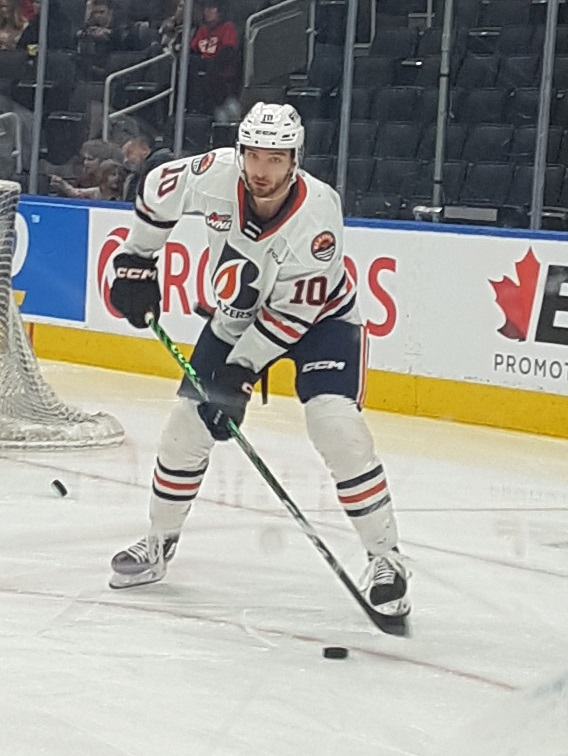
Ryan Hofer was selected 181st overall by the Washington Capitals.

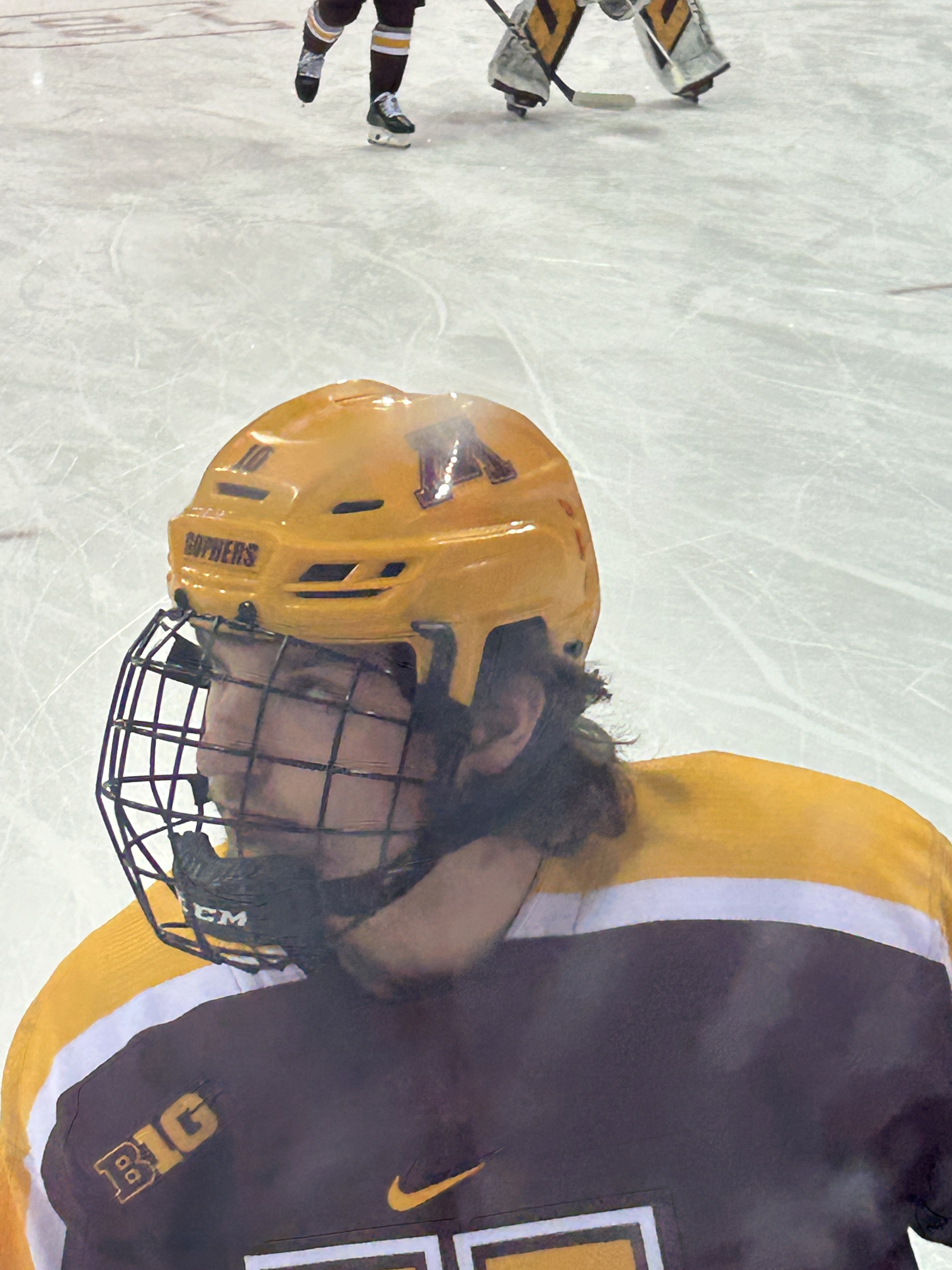
Connor Kurth was selected 192nd overall by the Tampa Bay Lightning.

#	Player	Nationality	NHL team	College/junior/club team
162	Emmett Croteau (G)	Canada	Montreal Canadiens	Waterloo Black Hawks (USHL)
163	Maksymilian Szuber (D)	Germany	Arizona Coyotes	EHC Red Bull München (DEL)
164	Barrett Hall (C)	United States	Seattle Kraken	Gentry Academy (USHS-MN)
165	Hunter McDonald (D)	United States	Philadelphia Flyers	Chicago Steel (USHL)
166	Josh Filmon (LW)	Canada	New Jersey Devils	Swift Current Broncos (WHL)
167	Nolan Collins (D)	Canada	Pittsburgh Penguins (from Chicago)^{1}	Sudbury Wolves (OHL)
168	Theo Wallberg (D)	Sweden	Ottawa Senators	Skelleftea AIK J20 (J20 Nationell)
169	Jared Wright (RW)	United States	Los Angeles Kings (from Detroit via Tampa Bay)^{2}	Omaha Lancers (USHL)
170	Jake Richard (RW)	United States	Buffalo Sabres	Muskegon Lumberjacks (USHL)
171	Jakub Vondras (G)	Czech Republic	Carolina Hurricanes (from Anaheim)^{3}	HC Plzen U20 (Czechia U20)
172	Joey Muldowney (RW)	United States	San Jose Sharks	Nichols School (USHS-Prep)
173	Dominic James (C)	United States	Chicago Blackhawks (from Columbus)^{4}	University of Minnesota-Duluth (NCAA)
174	Daylan Kuefler (LW)	Canada	New York Islanders	Kamloops Blazers (WHL)
175	Fabian Wagner (C)	Sweden	Winnipeg Jets	Linkoping HC (J20 Nationell)
176	Jackson Dorrington (D)	United States	Vancouver Canucks	Des Moines Buccaneers (USHL)
177	Ben Hemmerling (RW)	Canada	Vegas Golden Knights	Everett Silvertips (WHL)
178	Vyacheslav Buteyets (G)	Russia	Anaheim Ducks (from Nashville)^{5}	Belye Medvedi (MHL)
179	Matthew Seminoff (RW)	Canada	Dallas Stars	Kamloops Blazers (WHL)
180	Jack Sparkes (D)	Canada	Los Angeles Kings	St. Michael's Buzzers (OJHL)
181	Ryan Hofer (RW)	Canada	Washington Capitals	Everett Silvertips (WHL)
182	Luke Devlin (C)	United States	Pittsburgh Penguins	St. Andrew's College (CAHS)
183	Reid Dyck (G)	Canada	Boston Bruins	Swift Current Broncos (WHL)
184	Landon Sim (RW)	Canada	St. Louis Blues	London Knights (OHL)
185	Servac Petrovsky (C)	Slovakia	Minnesota Wild	Owen Sound Attack (OHL)
186	Joshua Davies (LW)	Canada	Florida Panthers (from Toronto via Columbus)^{6}	Swift Current Broncos (WHL)
187	Gustav Karlsson (C)	Sweden	Buffalo Sabres (from Calgary via Florida)^{7}	Orebro HK J20 (J20 Nationell)
188	Nils Juntorp (RW)	Sweden	Chicago Blackhawks (from Carolina)^{8}	HV71 J20 (J20 Nationell)
189	Tyler Muszelik (G)	United States	Florida Panthers	U.S. NDTP (USHL)
190	Nikita Yevseyev (D)	Russia	Edmonton Oilers	Bars Kazan (VHL)
191	Zakary Karpa (C)	United States	New York Rangers	Harvard University (NCAA)
192	Connor Kurth (RW)	United States	Tampa Bay Lightning	Dubuque Fighting Saints (USHL)
193	Christopher Romaine (D)	United States	Colorado Avalanche	Milton Academy (USHS-Prep)

Notes

1. The Chicago Blackhawks' sixth-round pick went to the Pittsburgh Penguins as the result of a trade on July 8, 2022, that sent Liam Gorman to Chicago in exchange for this pick.
2. The Detroit Red Wings' sixth-round pick went to the Los Angeles Kings as the result of a trade on July 8, 2022, that sent Pittsburgh's third-round pick in 2022 (86th overall) to Tampa Bay in exchange for Chicago's fourth-round pick in 2022 (103rd overall) and this pick.
  Tampa Bay previously acquired this pick as the result of a trade on July 30, 2021, that sent Mitchell Stephens to Detroit in exchange for this pick.
3. The Anaheim Ducks' sixth-round pick went to the Carolina Hurricanes as the result of a trade on April 12, 2021, that sent Haydn Fleury to Anaheim in exchange for Jani Hakanpaa and this pick.
4. The Columbus Blue Jackets' sixth-round pick went to the Chicago Blackhawks as the result of a trade on July 23, 2021, that sent Adam Boqvist, a first and second-round pick both in 2021 (12th and 44th overall) and a conditional first-round pick in 2022 to Columbus in exchange for Seth Jones, Tampa Bay's first-round pick in 2021 and this pick.
5. The Nashville Predators' sixth-round pick went to the Anaheim Ducks as the result of a trade on February 24, 2020, that sent Korbinian Holzer to Nashville in exchange for Matt Irwin and this pick.
6. The Toronto Maple Leafs' sixth-round pick went to the Florida Panthers as the result of a trade on March 21, 2022, that sent Tyler Inamoto to Columbus in exchange for Max Domi and this pick.
  Columbus previously acquired this pick as the result of a trade on April 9, 2021, that sent Riley Nash to Toronto in exchange for this pick (being conditional at the time of the trade). The condition – Columbus will receive a sixth-round pick in 2022 if Nash plays in 25% of the Maple Leafs' games during the 2021 Stanley Cup playoffs – was converted when Toronto was eliminated from the 2021 Stanley Cup playoffs with Nash having played two of the Maple Leafs' seven playoff games on May 31, 2021.
7. The Calgary Flames' sixth-round pick went to the Buffalo Sabres as the result of a trade on March 20, 2022, that sent Robert Hagg to Florida in exchange for this pick.
  Florida previously acquired this pick as the result of a trade April 12, 2021, that sent Emil Heineman and a second-round pick in 2022 to Calgary in exchange for Sam Bennett and this pick.
8. The Carolina Hurricanes' sixth-round pick went to the Chicago Blackhawks as the result of a trade on July 8, 2022, that sent a sixth-round pick in 2023 to Carolina in exchange for this pick.

=== Round seven ===
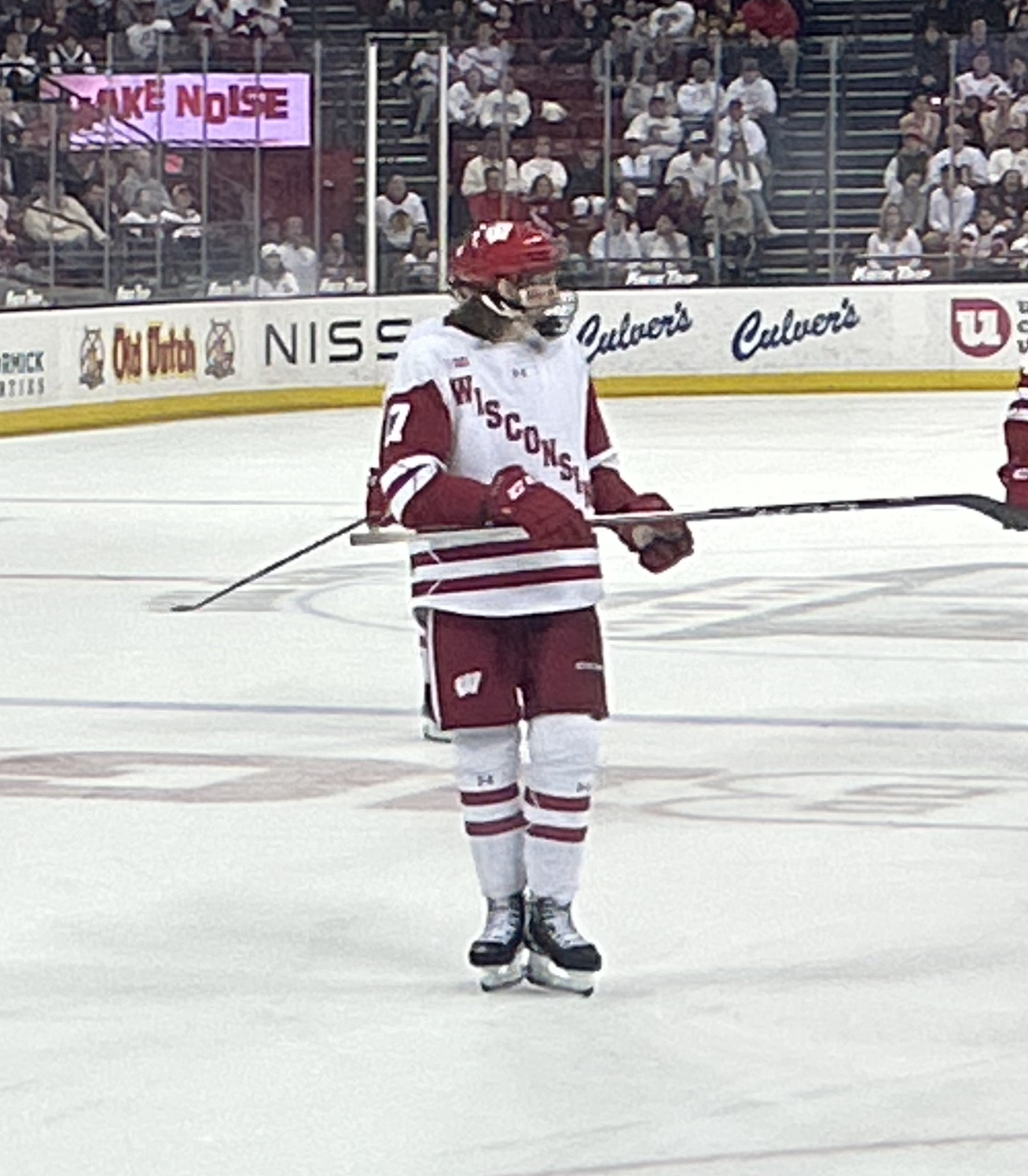
Owen Mehlenbacher was selected 201st overall by the Detroit Red Wings.

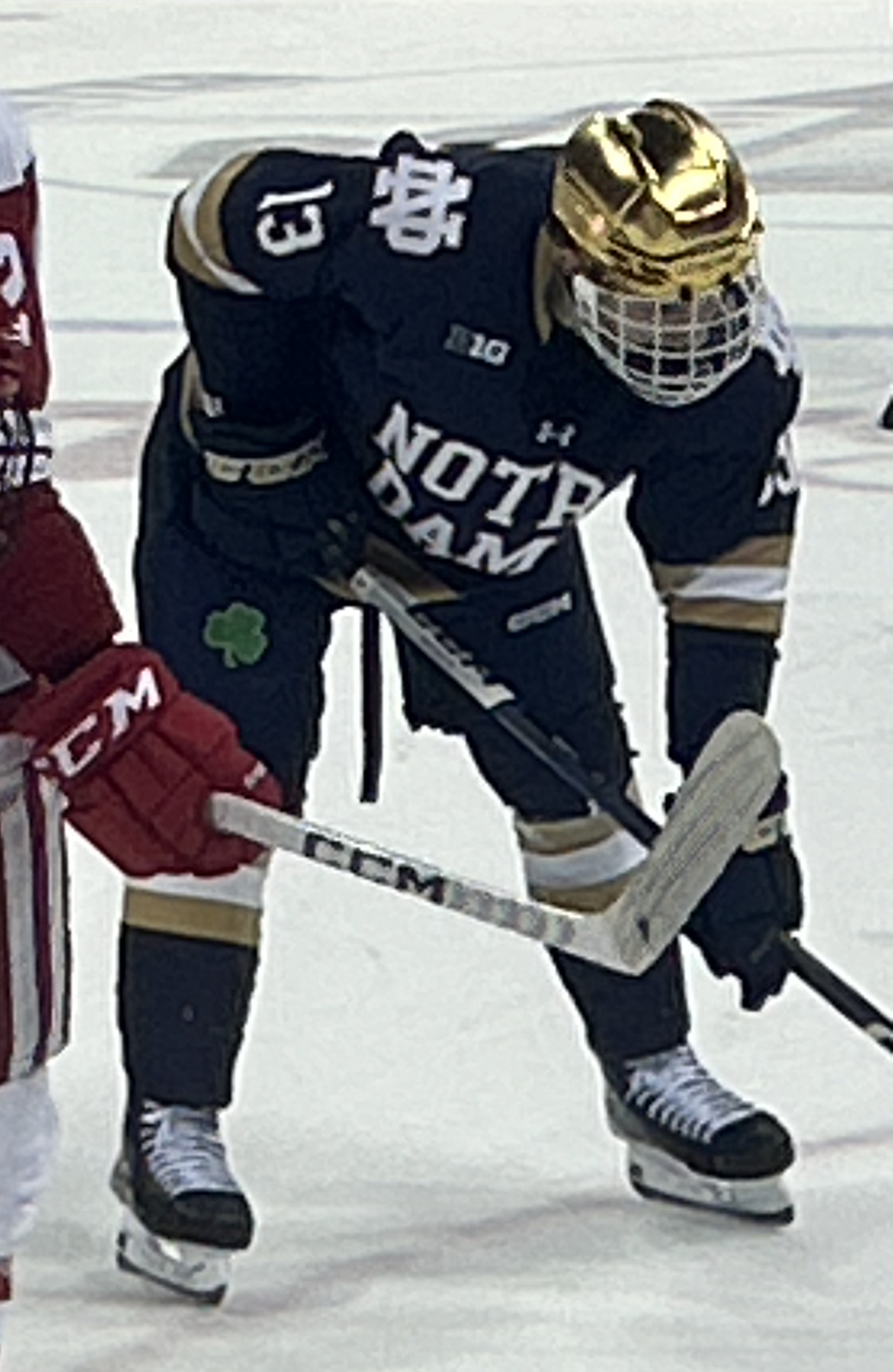
Brennan Ali was selected 212th overall by the Detroit Red Wings.

Tyson Dyck was selected 206th overall by the Ottawa Senators.

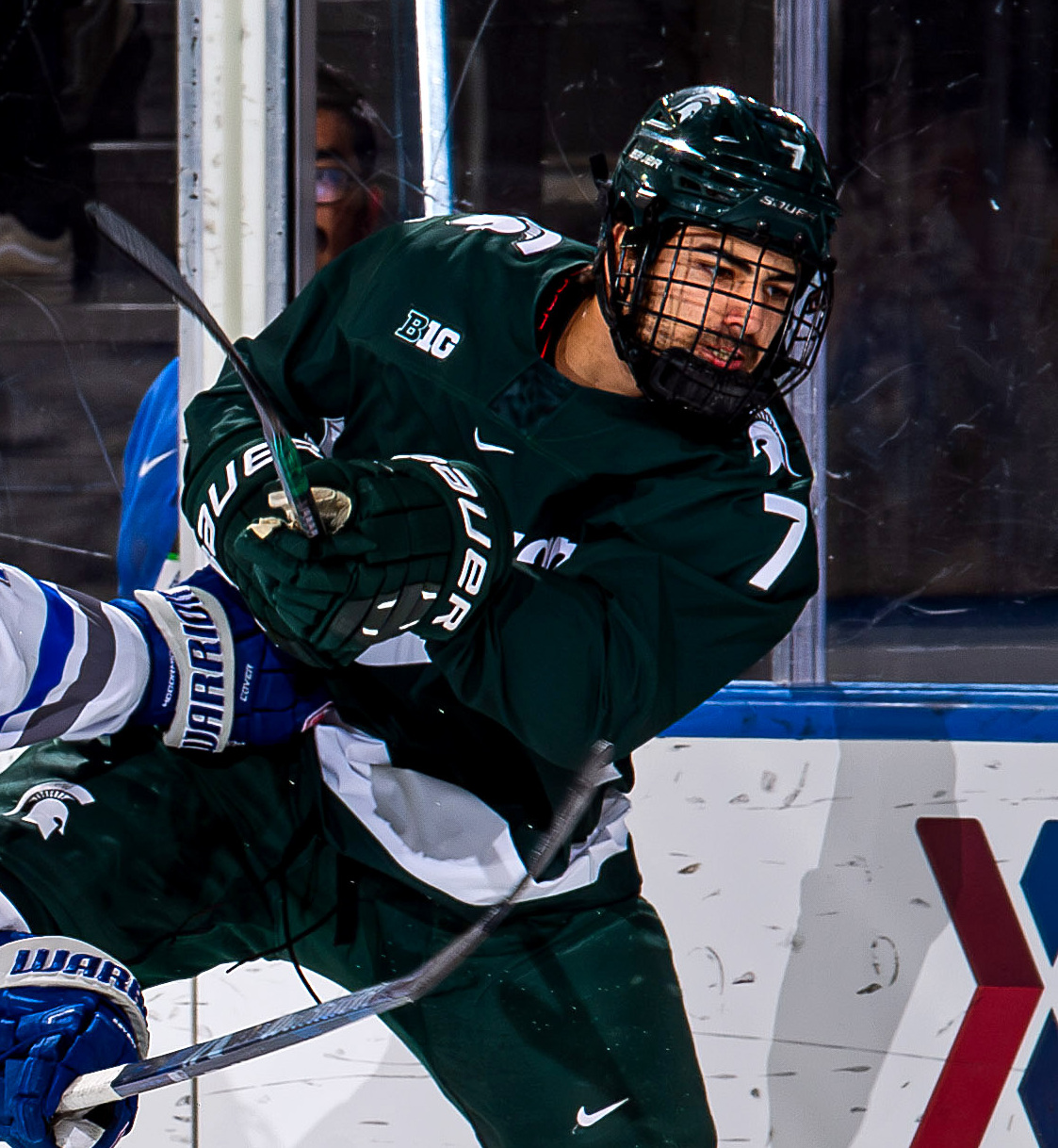
David Gucciardi was selected 213th overall by the Washington Capitals.

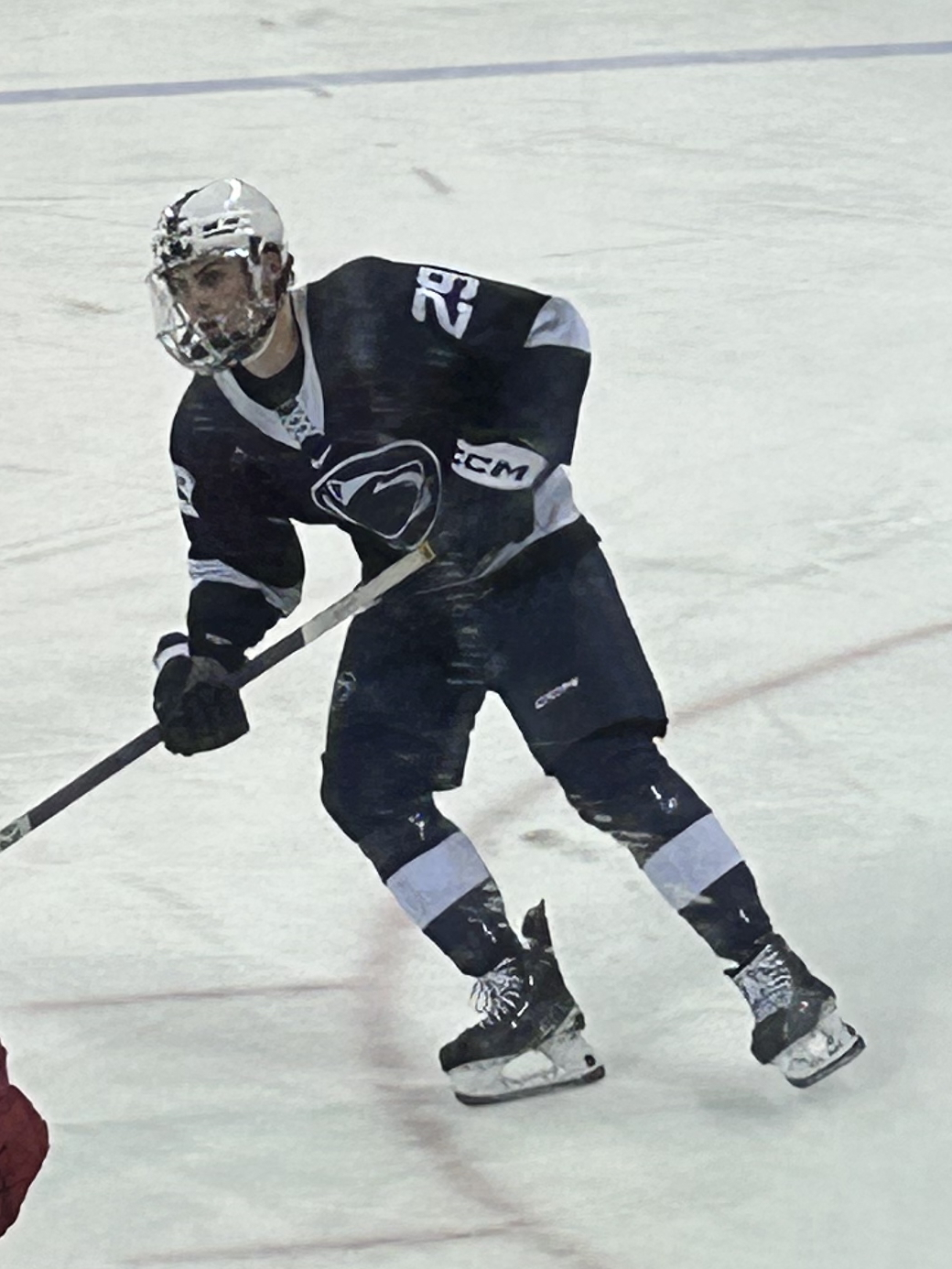
Reese Laubach was selected 217th overall by the San Jose Sharks.

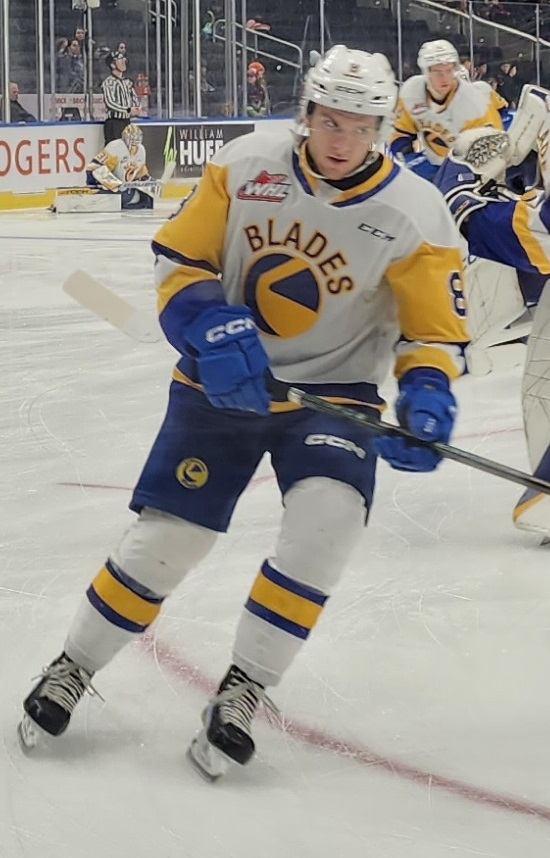
Brandon Lisowsky was selected 218th overall by the Toronto Maple Leafs.

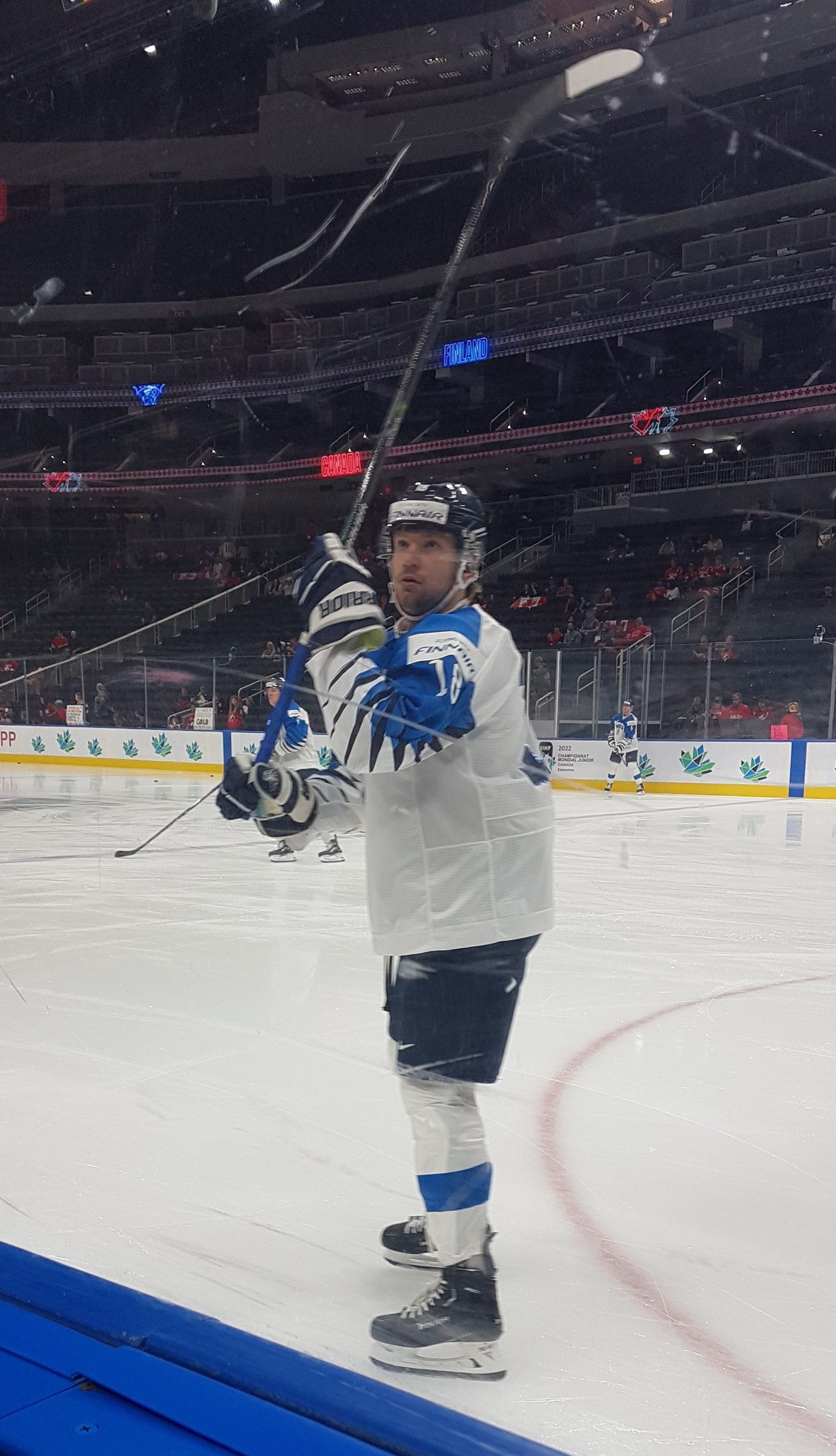
Joel Maatta was selected 222nd overall by the Edmonton Oilers.

#	Player	Nationality	NHL team	College/junior/club team
194	Petteri Nurmi (D)	Finland	Montreal Canadiens	HPK (Liiga)
195	Eli Barnett (D)	Canada	San Jose Sharks (from Arizona)^{1}	Victoria Grizzlies (BCHL)
196	Kyle Jackson (C)	Canada	Seattle Kraken	North Bay Battalion (OHL)
197	Santeri Sulku (LW)	Finland	Philadelphia Flyers	Jokerit U20 (U20 SM-sarja)
198	Artyom Barabosha (D)	Russia	New Jersey Devils	Krasnaya Armiya (MHL)
199	Riku Tohila (C)	Finland	Chicago Blackhawks	JYP U20 (U20 SM-sarja)
200	Jackson Edward (D)	Canada	Boston Bruins (from Ottawa)^{2}	London Knights (OHL)
201	Owen Mehlenbacher (C)	Canada	Detroit Red Wings	Muskegon Lumberjacks (USHL)
202	Joel Ratkovic Berndtsson (RW)	Sweden	Buffalo Sabres	Frolunda HC J20 (J20 Nationell)
203	James Fisher (RW)	United States	Columbus Blue Jackets (from Anaheim)^{3}	Belmont High School (USHS-Prep)
204	Adam Zlnka (RW)	Slovakia	Arizona Coyotes (from San Jose via Ottawa and San Jose)^{4}	Sioux Falls Stampede (USHL)
205	Alexander Pelevin (D)	Russia	Carolina Hurricanes (from Columbus)^{5}	Chaika Nizhny Novgorod (MHL)
206	Tyson Dyck (C)	Canada	Ottawa Senators (from NY Islanders)^{6}	Cranbrook Bucks (BCHL)
207	Dominic DiVincentiis (G)	Canada	Winnipeg Jets	North Bay Battalion (OHL)
208	Kirill Kudryavtsev (D)	Russia	Vancouver Canucks	Sault Ste. Marie Greyhounds (OHL)
209	Abram Wiebe (D)	Canada	Vegas Golden Knights	Chilliwack Chiefs (BCHL)
210	Benjamin Strinden (C)	United States	Nashville Predators	Muskegon Lumberjacks (USHL)
211	Linus Sjodin (C)	Sweden	Buffalo Sabres (from Dallas)^{7}	Rogle BK (SHL)
212	Brennan Ali (C)	United States	Detroit Red Wings (from Los Angeles)^{8}	Avon Old Farms School (US-Prep)
213	David Gucciardi (D)	Canada	Washington Capitals	Michigan State University (NCAA)
214	Liam Arnsby (C)	Canada	Florida Panthers (from Pittsburgh)^{9}	North Bay Battalion (OHL)
215	Kaleb Lawrence (RW)	Canada	Los Angeles Kings (from Boston)^{10}	Owen Sound Attack (OHL)
216	Miguel Tourigny (D)	Canada	Montreal Canadiens (from St. Louis via Montreal, Philadelphia and Arizona)^{11}	Acadie-Bathurst Titan (QMJHL)
217	Reese Laubach (C)	United States	San Jose Sharks (from Minnesota)^{12}	Northstar Christian Academy (NAPHL 18U)
218	Brandon Lisowsky (LW)	Canada	Toronto Maple Leafs	Saskatoon Blades (WHL)
219	Cade Littler (C)	United States	Calgary Flames	Wenatchee Wild (BCHL)
220	Alexis Gendron (RW)	Canada	Philadelphia Flyers (from Carolina)^{13}	Blainville-Boisbriand Armada (QMJHL)
221	Jack Devine (RW)	United States	Florida Panthers	University of Denver (NCAA)
222	Joel Maatta (C)	Finland	Edmonton Oilers	University of Vermont (NCAA)
223	Dyllan Gill (D)	Canada	Tampa Bay Lightning (from NY Rangers)^{14}	Rouyn-Noranda Huskies (QMJHL)
224	Klavs Veinbergs (LW)	Latvia	Tampa Bay Lightning	HK Riga (MHL)
225	Ivan Zhigalov (G)	Belarus	Colorado Avalanche	Sherbrooke Phoenix (QMJHL)

Notes

1. The Arizona Coyotes' seventh-round pick went to the San Jose Sharks as the result of a trade on July 17, 2021, that sent Josef Korenar and a second-round pick in 2022 to Arizona in exchange for Adin Hill and this pick.
2. The Ottawa Senators' seventh-round pick went to the Boston Bruins as the result of a trade on March 21, 2022, that sent Zach Senyshyn and a fifth-round pick in 2022 to Ottawa in exchange for Josh Brown and this pick (being conditional at the time of the trade). The condition – Boston will receive a seventh-round pick in 2022 if Senyshyn plays in fewer than five games for the Senators before the conclusion of the 2021–22 NHL season – was converted when it was no longer possible for Senyshyn to play in five games for Ottawa in the 2021–22 season on April 26, 2022.
3. The Anaheim Ducks' seventh-round pick went to the Columbus Blue Jackets as the result of a trade on October 7, 2020, that sent a seventh-round pick in 2020 to Anaheim in exchange for this pick (being conditional at the time of the trade). The condition – Columbus will receive a seventh-round pick in 2022 if the pick is available at the time of the selection – was converted when the pick became available after an earlier conditional trade with Edmonton was resolved on April 8, 2021.
4. The San Jose Sharks' seventh-round pick went to the Arizona Coyotes as the result of a trade on July 8, 2022, that sent Vancouver's seventh-round pick in 2023 to San Jose in exchange for this pick.
  San Jose previously re-acquired this pick as the result of a trade on October 24, 2021, that sent Dylan Gambrell to Ottawa in exchange for this pick.
  Ottawa previously acquired this pick as the result of a trade on January 27, 2021, that sent Christian Jaros to San Jose in exchange for Jack Kopacka and this pick.
5. The Columbus Blue Jackets' seventh-round pick went to the Carolina Hurricanes as the result of a trade on February 13, 2021, that sent Gregory Hofmann to Columbus in exchange for this pick.
6. The New York Islanders' seventh-round pick went to the Ottawa Senators as the result of a trade on April 11, 2021, that sent Braydon Coburn to New York in exchange for this pick.
7. The Dallas Stars' seventh-round pick went to the Buffalo Sabres as the result of a trade on June 10, 2022, that sent future considerations to Dallas in exchange for Ben Bishop and this pick.
8. The Los Angeles Kings' seventh-round pick went to the Detroit Red Wings as the result of a trade on March 20, 2022, that sent Troy Stecher to Los Angeles in exchange for this pick.
9. The Pittsburgh Penguins' seventh-round pick went to the Florida Panthers as the result of a trade on July 8, 2022, that sent a seventh-round pick in 2023 to Pittsburgh in exchange for this pick.
10. The Boston Bruins' seventh-round pick went to the Los Angeles Kings as the result of a trade on July 8, 2022, that sent a seventh-round pick in 2023 to Boston in exchange for this pick.
11. The St. Louis Blues' seventh-round pick went to the Montreal Canadiens as the result of a trade on July 24, 2021, that sent a seventh-round pick in 2021 to Arizona in exchange for this pick.
  Arizona previously acquired this pick as the result of a trade on July 22, 2021, that sent future considerations to Philadelphia in exchange for Shayne Gostisbehere, a second-round pick in 2022 and this pick.
  Philadelphia previously acquired this pick as the result of a trade on April 12, 2021, that sent Erik Gustafsson to Montreal in exchange for this pick.
  Montreal previously acquired this pick as the result of a trade on September 2, 2020, that sent Washington's third-round pick and Chicago's seventh-round pick both in 2020 to St. Louis in exchange for Jake Allen and this pick.
12. The Minnesota Wild's seventh-round pick went to the San Jose Sharks as the result of a trade on October 5, 2020, that sent a fifth-round pick in 2022 to Minnesota in exchange for Devan Dubnyk and this pick.
13. The Carolina Hurricanes' seventh-round pick went to the Philadelphia Flyers as the result of a trade on July 8, 2022, that sent a fourth-round pick in 2022 (101st overall), a conditional third-round pick in 2023 and a second-round pick in 2024 to Carolina in exchange for Tony DeAngelo and this pick.
14. The New York Rangers' seventh-round pick went to the Tampa Bay Lightning as the result of a trade on July 17, 2021, that sent Barclay Goodrow to New York in exchange for this pick.

== Draftees based on nationality ==
Rank	Country	Selections	Percent	Top selection
	North America	137	60.9%	
1	Canada	89	39.6%	Shane Wright, 4th
2	United States	48	21.3%	Logan Cooley, 3rd
	Europe	88	39.1%	
3	Sweden	27	12.0%	Jonathan Lekkerimaki, 15th
4	Russia	23	10.3%	Pavel Mintyukov, 10th
5	Finland	14	6.2%	Joakim Kemell, 17th
6	Czech Republic	9	4.0%	David Jiricek, 6th
7	Slovakia	6	2.7%	Juraj Slafkovsky, 1st
8	Latvia	3	1.3%	Dans Locmelis, 119th
9	Austria	2	0.8%	Marco Kasper, 8th
9	Germany	2	0.8%	Julian Lutz, 43rd
11	Switzerland	1	0.4%	Lian Bischel, 18th
11	Belarus	1	0.4%	Ivan Zhigalov, 225th

=== North American draftees by state/province ===
Rank	State/province	Selections	Percent	Top selection
1	Ontario	39	17.3%	Shane Wright, 4th
2	Alberta	12	5.3%	Matthew Savoie, 9th
3	Quebec	11	4.9%	Nathan Gaucher, 22nd
3	British Columbia	11	4.9%	Fraser Minten, 38th
5	Minnesota	9	4.0%	Jimmy Snuggerud, 23rd
5	Massachusetts	9	4.0%	Cameron Lund, 34th
7	Manitoba	8	3.6%	Conor Geekie, 11th
8	Michigan	5	2.2%	Frank Nazar, 13th
9	New Brunswick	4	1.8%	Samuel Savoie, 81st
10	Illinois	3	1.3%	Lane Hutson, 62nd
10	California	3	1.3%	Garrett Brown, 99th
12	Pennsylvania	2	0.9%	Logan Cooley, 3rd
12	Saskatchewan	2	0.9%	Kevin Korchinski, 7th
12	Wisconsin	2	0.9%	Isaac Howard, 31st
12	Florida	2	0.9%	Seamus Casey, 46th
12	New Jersey	2	0.9%	Devin Kaplan, 69th
12	North Dakota	2	0.9%	Cole Spicer, 117th
12	Nova Scotia	2	0.9%	Jake Furlong, 140th
12	New York	2	0.9%	Hunter McDonald, 165th
20	Arizona	1	0.4%	Cutter Gauthier, 5th
20	Nebraska	1	0.4%	Rutger McGroarty, 14th
20	Newfoundland and Labrador	1	0.4%	Ryan Greene, 57th
20	Colorado	1	0.4%	Aidan Thompson, 90th
20	Connecticut	1	0.4%	Charlie Leddy, 126th
20	Maryland	1	0.4%	Cameron O'Neill, 143rd
20	Washington	1	0.4%	Cade Littler, 219th

== Broadcasting ==
In Canada, coverage of every round of the draft was televised on Sportsnet.

In the United States, coverage of the opening round of the draft was televised on ESPN and ESPN+. Coverage of the second day of the draft was televised on NHLN and ESPN+.

== See also ==
- 2018–19 NHL transactions
- 2019–20 NHL transactions
- 2020–21 NHL transactions
- 2021–22 NHL transactions
- 2022–23 NHL transactions
- 2022–23 NHL season
- List of first overall NHL draft picks
- List of NHL players
