= Stalnye Lisy =

Stalnye Lisy Steel Foxes
- City: Magnitogorsk, Russia
- League: Minor Hockey League
- Conference: Eastern
- Division: Volga
- Founded: 2009
- Home arena: Arena Metallurg
- Colors
- Head coach: Igor Androsov
- Affiliate: Metallurg Magnitogorsk (KHL)
- Website: mhl.metallurg.ru

Franchise history
- 2009–present: Stalnye Lisy

Stalnye Lisy (Russian: Стальные Лисы; English: Steel Foxes) is a junior ice hockey team from Magnitogorsk, Chelyabinsk Oblast, Russia, which consists of players from the Metallurg Magnitogorsk academy. They are members of the Minor Hockey League, the top tier of junior hockey in the country.

== Team and player honors ==
Kharlamov Cup

- (gold) Winners (1): 2009–10
- (silver) Runners-up (1): 2010–11
- (bronze) 3rd place (1): 2011–12

Viacheslav Fetisov Award

- Sergei Tereshchenko: 2009–10

Vladislav Tretiak Award

- Dmitri Voloshin: 2009–10

Vladimir Yurzinov Award

- Evgeni Koreshkov: 2009–10
