= Sergei Tereshchenko =

Russian footballer

Personal information
- Full name: Sergei Olegovich Tereshchenko
- Date of birth: 18 January 1984 (age 42)
- Place of birth: Moscow, Soviet Union
- Height: 1.83 m (6 ft 0 in)
- Position: Defender

Youth career
- 2000–2002: Torpedo-ZIL Moscow

Senior career*
Years	Team	Apps	(Gls)
2001–2003	Torpedo-Metallurg Moscow	0	(0)
2004	Lokomotiv Vitebsk	16	(0)
2005–2008	Torpedo-RG Moscow	72	(0)
2009	Prialit Reutov		
2011–2013	Podolye Podolsky district	28	(0)
- * Club domestic league appearances and goals

Sergei Olegovich Tereshchenko (Russian: Серге́й Олегович Терещенко; born 18 January 1984) is a former Russian former professional footballer.

== Club career ==
He made his debut for FC Torpedo-Metallurg Moscow on 6 June 2003 in a Russian Premier League Cup game against FC Torpedo Moscow.

In 2004 he played in the Belarusian Premier League.
