= Ice hockey at the 2022 European Youth Olympic Winter Festival =

- Venue: Kajaanin jäähalli
- Date: 13–17 December 2021; 21–25 March 2022

Ice hockey at the 2022 European Youth Olympic Winter Festival comprised two ice hockey tournaments in the under-17 competition class – a boys' tournament and a girls' tournament – during the Vuokatti 2022 edition of the European Youth Olympic Festival (EYOF). The boys' tournament was held from 13 to 17 December 2021 and, following the postponement of the event due to the COVID-19 pandemic, the girls' tournament was played from 21 to 25 March 2022. Both tournaments were played at the Kajaanin jäähalli in Kajaani, Finland. The girls' tournament marked the first time women's ice hockey was included in the programme of a European Youth Olympic Festival.

== Medal summary ==
=== Medal table ===
* Host nation (Finland)

Rank	Nation	Gold	Silver	Bronze	Total
1	Finland*	1	0	1	2
2	Czech Republic	1	0	0	1
3	Belarus	0	1	0	1
3	Sweden	0	1	0	1
5	Russia	0	0	1	1
Totals (5 entries)		2	2	2	6

=== Medalists ===
Event	Gold	Silver	Bronze
Boys	Finland	Belarus	Russia
Girls	Czech Republic	Sweden	Finland

== Boys' tournament ==
2022 European Youth Olympic Winter Festival – Boys' tournament

Tournament details
- Host country: Finland
- Venue: 1 (in 1 host city)
- Dates: 13–17 December 2021
- Teams: 5

Final positions
- Champions: Finland (3rd title)
- Runners-up: Belarus
- Third place: Russia
- Fourth place: Czech Republic

Tournament statistics
- Games played: 10
- Goals scored: 58 (5.8 per game)
- Attendance: 3,402 (340 per game)
- Scoring leader: (Czech Republic) Eduard Šalé (8 points)

Played during 13 to 17 December 2021, the boys' ice hockey tournament was the first event contested as part of the EYOF Vuokatti 2022. The five participating teams played a single round-robin of ten games and ranking was determined by a standard point system: three points were awarded for a win, two points for an overtime win, one point for an overtime loss, and no points were awarded for a loss in regulation.

Hosts Finland were victorious in each of their four games, successfully sweeping the tournament and winning their third EYOF gold medal. Belarus took home silver after beating bronze medalists Russia by just one point in the points tally – the result of their overtime win over Russia in game four. Despite ranking second in goals scored, the Czech Republic took fourth place in the final rankings and Latvia rounded out the table in fifth place.

The Czech team featured the top three point scorers of the tournament: scoring leader Eduard Šalé, who scored 2 goals and 6 assists for 8 points; second ranked Šimon Slavíček, who scored 4 goals and 2 assists for 6 points; and third ranked Adam Dvořák, who scored 4 goals and an assist for 5 points. Four Finns tied for fourth in scoring with 2 goals and 3 assists for 5 points each: Jere Lassila, Lenni Hämeenaho, Aleksanteri Kaskimäki, and Oskari Vuorio. The goal scoring table was topped by a three-player tie between the Czech Republic's Slavíček and Dvořák and Nikolai Tishkevich of Belarus, all of whom tallied 4 goals apiece.

The leading scorer of those teams not represented in the top-five on the points table were: Nikolai Tishkevich (4+0) for Belarus, Artem Duda (0+4) for Russia, and Emīls Veckaktiņš (2+1) for Latvia.

=== Final standings ===
Pos	Team	Pld	W	OTW	OTL	L	GF	GA	GD	Pts
1st place, gold medalist(s)	Finland (H)	4	4	0	0	0	18	8	+10	12
2nd place, silver medalist(s)	Belarus	4	2	1	0	1	8	9	−1	8
3rd place, bronze medalist(s)	Russia	4	2	0	1	1	11	8	+3	7
4	Czech Republic	4	1	0	0	3	16	14	+2	3
5	Latvia	4	0	0	0	4	5	19	−14	0

Source: leijonat.fi
(H) Host

=== Games ===
All times are local (UTC+2).

13 December 2021; 15:00	Russia	4–2 (2–0, 0–1, 2–1)	Czech Republic	Kajaanin jäähalli, Kajaani; Attendance: 225

Game reference

Egor Zavragin
Goalies
Štěpán Vopravil
Referees:
(Finland) Niilo-Kustaa Määttä
(Finland) Ville-Veikko Väkeväinen
Linesmen:
(Finland) Jonne Juvonen
(Finland) Oskari Saarimäki

Nedopekin (Dolzhenkov) – 02:48	1–0
Rogovski (Duda, Nedopekin) (PP) – 13:26	2–0
	2–1	22:04 – Prčík (Šalé, Petr) (PP)
Kvochko (PS) – 48:49	3–1
Dolzhenkov (Mukhanov, Duda) (PP) – 51:21	4–1
	4–2	54:02 – Šalé (Čech, Prčík) (EA)

6 min
Penalties
10 min
31
Shots
24

13 December 2021; 18:30	Finland	5–1 (3–0, 0–0, 2–1)	Latvia	Kajaanin jäähalli, Kajaani; Attendance: 725

Game reference

Topias Leinonen
Goalies
Deivs Deivids Rolovs
Kārlis Beķeris-Brīvkalns
Referees:
(Finland) Aleksanteri Palo
(Finland) Janne Wuorenheimo
Linesmen:
(Finland) Kevin Karenius
(Finland) Luka Mäkinen

Vuorio (Laakso, Lundell) – 01:59	1–0
Vuorio (Kulonummi) – 04:16	2–0
Nyman (Rönni, Hämeenaho) – 07:02	3–0
Kulonummi (Kaskimäki, Lassila) (PP) – 44:43	4–0
Nyman (Rönni, Laakso) – 47:39	5–0
	5–1	59:10 – Veckaktiņš (Strādnieks, Krūklītis)

0 min
Penalties
6 min
40
Shots
11

14 December 2021; 15:30	Czech Republic	9–3 (3–1, 3–0, 3–2)	Latvia	Kajaanin jäähalli, Kajaani; Attendance: 241

Game reference

Jak Špunar
Goalies
Kārlis Beķeris-Brīvkalns
Deivs Deivids Rolovs
Referees:
(Finland) Aleksanteri Palo
(Finland) Janne Wuorenheimo
Linesmen:
(Finland) Kevin Karenius
(Finland) Luka Mäkinen

Slavíček (Prčík, Šalé) – 01:35	1–0
	1–1	09:34 – Bukarts (Veckaktiņš, Bulāns) (PP)
Slavíček (Krajčík, Šalé) – 13:07	2–1
Slavíček (Šalé, Petr) (PP) – 19:30	3–1
Dvořák (Soukup, Becher) – 29:45	4–1
Formánek (Šmajda) – 30:16	5–1
Formánek (Soukup, Čech) (PP) – 31:55	6–1
Petr (Hamara, Slavíček) (PP) – 40:31	7–1
Dvořák (Soukup, Hebek) (SH) – 42:31	8–1
	8–2	43:26 – Veckaktiņš (Bulāns, Rullers) (PP)
Slavíček (Hamara, Šalé) (PP) – 49:05	9–2
	9–3	57:06 – Krūklītis (Strazdiņš, Mateiko)

12 min
Penalties
14 min
41
Shots
14

14 December 2021; 18:30	Russia	1–2 OT (0–0, 0–1, 1–0) (OT: 0–1)	Belarus	Kajaanin jäähalli, Kajaani; Attendance: 279

Game reference

Sergei Murashov
Goalies
Yan Shostak
Referees:
(Finland) Niilo-Kustaa Määttä
(Finland) Ville-Veikko Väkeväinen
Linesmen:
(Finland) Jonne Juvonen
(Finland) Oskari Saarimäki

	0–1	30:49 – M. Marshchanok (Omelyusik, Shatilo)
Zaitsev (Rimashevskiy, Maksimov) – 42:39	1–1
	1–2	64:18 – Tishkevich

6 min
Penalties
2 min
30
Shots
20

15 December 2021; 15:00	Latvia	0–3 (0–0, 0–3, 0–0)	Russia	Kajaanin jäähalli, Kajaani; Attendance: 157

Game reference

Deivs Deivids Rolovs
Goalies
Egor Zavragin
Referees:
(Finland) Aleksanteri Palo
(Finland) Janne Wuorenheimo
Linesmen:
(Finland) Kevin Karenius
(Finland) Luka Mäkinen

0–1	27:52 – Dolzhenkov (Pelevin)
0–2	34:30 – Rogovski (Barabosha)
0–3	35:54 – Mukhanov (Demidov, Karpov)

2 min
Penalties
4 min
8
Shots
40

15 December 2021; 18:30	Belarus	1–5 (0–0, 0–3, 1–2)	Finland	Kajaanin jäähalli, Kajaani; Attendance: 350

Game reference

Lorens Zinaddin
Goalies
Eemil Vinni
Referees:
(Finland) Niilo-Kustaa Määttä
(Finland) Ville-Veikko Väkeväinen
Linesmen:
(Finland) Jonne Juvonen
(Finland) Oskari Saarimäki

	0–1	27:20 – Minkkinen (Lassila)
	0–2	33:15 – Lundell (Kulonummi, Vuorio)
	0–3	38:36 – Kaskimäki (Halttunen, Vuorinen)
S. Marshchanok (Anoshko, Muromtsev) (PP) – 43:54	1–3
	1–4	55:47 – Hämeenaho (Rönni, Nyman)
	1–5	58:52 – Lassila (SH, ENG)

29 min
Penalties
12 min
20
Shots
36

16 December 2021; 15:00	Latvia	1–2 (1–0, 0–0, 0–2)	Belarus	Kajaanin jäähalli, Kajaani; Attendance: 60

Game reference

Kārlis Beķeris-Brīvkalns
Goalies
Yan Shostak
Referees:
(Finland) Toni Hyvärinen
(Finland) Henri Neva
Linesmen:
(Finland) Petteri Niemelä
(Finland) Santeri Orava

Bulāns (Strazdiņš, Bukarts) – 19:55	1–0
	1–1	49:24 – Kovgorenya (Pashuto, Kamko)
	1–2	53:33 – Tishkevich (Bulgakov, Tukach)

8 min
Penalties
0 min
10
Shots
39

16 December 2021; 18:30	Czech Republic	3–4 (1–1, 0–2, 2–1)	Finland	Kajaanin jäähalli, Kajaani; Attendance: 364

Game reference

Štěpán Vopravil
Goalies
Topias Leinonen
Referees:
(Finland) Jonne Mäkisalo
(Finland) Mikael Vihriälä
Linesmen:
(Finland) Teo Mäkinen
(Finland) Santeri Puhakka

Šalé (Slavíček, Prčík) – 15:33	1–0
	1–1	17:37 – Hokkanen (Nyman, Rönni)
	1–2	28:53 – Kaskimäki (Raiman) (PP)
	1–3	37:33 – Hämeenaho (Kaskimäki)
Dvořák (Formánek, Vovsík) – 41:42	2–3
	2–4	47:57 – Lundell (Lassila, Kulonummi) (PP)
Dvořák (Polák) – 51:11	3–4

10 min
Penalties
8 min
22
Shots
23

17 December 2021; 14:30	Belarus	3–2 (1–1, 1–1, 1–0)	Czech Republic	Kajaanin jäähalli, Kajaani; Attendance: 154

Game reference

Yan Shostak
Goalies
Jak Špunar
Referees:
(Finland) Jonne Mäkisalo
(Finland) Mikael Vihriälä
Linesmen:
(Finland) Teo Mäkinen
(Finland) Santeri Puhakka

	0–1	15:20 – Čech (Soukup, Dvořák)
S. Marshchanok (Ladutko) – 16:35	1–1
Tishkevich (Bulgakov) – 28:42	2–1
	2–2	33:44 – Bareš (Šalé, Hamara) (PP)
Tishkevich (SH) – 50:37	3–2

10 min
Penalties
10 min
21
Shots
38

17 December 2021; 18:00	Finland	4–3 (2–1, 2–0, 0–1)	Russia	Kajaanin jäähalli, Kajaani; Attendance: 847

Game reference

Topias Leinonen
Goalies
Egor Zavragin
Sergei Murashov
Referees:
(Finland) Toni Hyvärinen
(Finland) Henri Neva
Linesmen:
(Finland) Petteri Niemelä
(Finland) Santeri Orava

	0–1	02:37 – Rykov (Duda, Barabosha)
Lundell (Halttunen, Kaskimäki) (PP) – 08:16	1–1
Hokkanen (Vuorio) (SH) – 14:31	2–1
	2–2	23:08 – Polyakov (Duda, Kvochko)
Hakala (Hämeenaho, Laakso) (PP) – 32:03	3–2
Lassila (Hämeenaho, Vuorio) – 32:36	4–2
	4–3	43:31 – Demidov (Mukhanov)

8 min
Penalties
8 min
24
Shots
35

== Girls' tournament ==
2022 European Youth Olympic Winter Festival – Girls' tournament

Tournament details
- Host country: Finland
- Venue: 1 (in 1 host city)
- Dates: 21–25 March 2022
- Teams: 6

Final positions
- Champions: Czech Republic (1st title)
- Runners-up: Sweden
- Third place: Finland
- Fourth place: Switzerland

Tournament statistics
- Games played: 9
- Attendance: 1,140 (127 per game)
- Scoring leader: (Finland) Pauliina Salonen (6 points)

The girls' tournament was played in two stages, a preliminary round followed by the finals, a different format than was used for the boys' single pool tournament. In the preliminary round, the six participating teams were separated into two groups of three and played a single round-robin of three games per group. Ranking from the preliminary round established placement for the finals.

The Czech Republic and Sweden, winners of Group A and B respectively, faced off in the gold medal game. After sixty minutes of play, the match was tied 1–1, with a Czech goal from Adéla Šapovalivová and the Swedish goal from Olivia Sohrner. The tie was maintained through an overtime period and held steady until the fourth round of the shootout, when the Czech Republic's Zikmunda Mazancová scored what would stand as the only goal registered by any of the ten shooters and the Czechs won the inaugural gold medal in girls' ice hockey at a European Youth Olympic Winter Festival.

Finland claimed victory over Switzerland with a 5–1 score in the bronze medal game and Slovakia held Hungary scoreless to take fifth place.

The girls' ice hockey tournament was the third-most viewed event of the EYOF Vuokatti 2022 in terms of streaming, with 13,624 viewers.

=== Preliminary round ===
==== Group A ====
Pos	Team	Pld	W	OTW	OTL	L	GF	GA	GD	Pts	Qualification
1	Czech Republic	2	2	0	0	0	8	1	+7	6	Final
2	Switzerland	2	1	0	0	1	6	4	+2	3	Bronze medal game
3	Hungary	2	0	0	0	2	0	9	−9	0	Fifth place game

Source: Finnish Ice Hockey Association

21 March 2022; 18:30	Switzerland	5–0 (1–0, 3–0, 1–0)	Hungary	Kajaanin jäähalli, Kajaani; Attendance: 62

Game reference

Talina Bender
Margaux Favre
Goalies
Zsuzsa Révész

Eggli – 05:13	1–0
Büchi (Wey) – 24:26	2–0
Eggli (Gaberell, Baechler) (PP) – 26:25	3–0
Rossel (Aymon, Peter) – 33:03	4–0
Eggli (Gaberell, Büchi) – 44:02	5–0

4 min
Penalties
10 min
35
Shots
11

22 March 2022; 15:00	Czech Republic	4–1 (0–0, 0–1, 4–0)	Switzerland	Kajaanin jäähalli, Kajaani; Attendance: 16

Game reference

Michaela Hesová
Goalies
Margaux Favre

	0–1	22:12 – Gaberell (Baechler) (PP)
Slavíčková (Brichová) – 44:15	1–1
Pištěková (Malicka, Příhodová) – 45:48	2–1
Mazancová – 55:49	3–1
Juříčková (Plosová) – 56:11	4–1

6 min
Penalties
6 min
30
Shots
15

23 March 2022; 15:00	Hungary	0–4 (0–3, 0–1, 0–0)	Czech Republic	Kajaanin jäähalli, Kajaani; Attendance: 15

Game reference

Bianka Bogáti
Goalies
Barbora Dalecká

0–1	06:32 – Šapovalivová (Malicka, Slavíčková)
0–2	16:14 – Hotová (Narovcová, Plosová) (PP)
0–3	17:20 – Slavíčková (Šapovalivová, Vaníčková)
0–4	21:05 – Vaníčková (Šapovalivová)

6 min
Penalties
10 min
14
Shots
31

==== Group B ====
Pos	Team	Pld	W	OTW	OTL	L	GF	GA	GD	Pts	Qualification
1	Sweden	2	1	1	0	0	7	4	+3	5	Final
2	Finland (H)	2	1	0	1	0	6	6	0	4	Bronze medal game
3	Slovakia	2	0	0	0	2	3	6	−3	0	Fifth place game

Source: Finnish Ice Hockey Association
(H) Host

21 March 2022; 12:30	Slovakia	2–3 (0–0, 2–2, 0–1)	Finland	Kajaanin jäähalli, Kajaani; Attendance: 500

Game reference

Laura Medviďová
Goalies
Lilia Huovinen

Donovalová (Beňáková) – 23:16	1–0
	1–1	26:41 – Keränen
	1–2	28:22 – Kitula (Keränen)
Blichová (Beňáková, Donovalová) – 28:36	2–2
	2–3	59:41 – Salonen (Kokora)

6 min
Penalties
0 min
13
Shots
35

22 March 2022; 18:30	Sweden	3–1 (3–0, 0–1, 0–0)	Slovakia	Kajaanin jäähalli, Kajaani; Attendance: 48

Game reference

Felicia Frank
Goalies
Lívia Debnárová

Hedqvist (Hallin, Sohrner) (PP) – 08:57	1–0
Bergeby Hallbeck (Hedqvist) – 11:56	2–0
Hallin (Hedqvist) – 12:23	3–0
	3–1	39:35 – Blichová (Donovalová)

8 min
Penalties
2 min
28
Shots
21

23 March 2022; 18:30	Finland	3–4 OT (1–1, 0–0, 2–2) (OT: 0–1)	Sweden	Kajaanin jäähalli, Kajaani; Attendance: 219

Game reference

Lilia Huovinen
Goalies
Felicia Frank

	0–1	05:21 – Sohrner (Rehn)
Salonen (Varjonen) – 09:50	1–1
Salonen (Keränen) (PP) – 44:56	2–1
Vanhanen (Berg, Keränen) – 46:23	3–1
	3–2	48:33 – Hedqvist (Leijonhielm)
	3–3	54:35 – Gustafsson (Ålenius, Andersson) (PP)
	3–4	61:11 – Andersson (Gustafsson)

6 min
Penalties
4 min
24
Shots
27

=== Final round ===
==== Fifth place game ====
24 March 2022; 15:00	Hungary	0–3 (0–1, 0–1, 0–1)	Slovakia	Kajaanin jäähalli, Kajaani; Attendance: 15

Game reference

Zsuzsa Révész
Goalies
Laura Medviďová

0–1	02:33 – Stern (Mateičková)
0–2	20:58 – Dobiášová (Paulínyová)
0–3	52:02 – Blichová (Dobiášová)

6 min
Penalties
10 min
12
Shots
29

==== Bronze medal game ====
24 March 2022; 18:30	Switzerland	1–5 (0–2, 1–2, 0–1)	Finland	Kajaanin jäähalli, Kajaani; Attendance: 70

Game reference

Margaux Favre
Talina Benderer
Goalies
Ronja Pätsi

	0–1	09:44 – Lappalainen (Salonen)
	0–2	11:13 – Salonen (Vanhanen, Keränen) (PP)
Wey (Büchi, Eggli) (PP) – 21:05	1–2
	1–3	23:13 – Keränen (Vanhanen, Salonen) (PP)
	1–4	31:16 – Krook
	1–5	58:03 – Vanhanen (Kokora) (ENG)

10 min
Penalties
8 min
20
Shots
28

==== Final ====
25 March 2022; 13:00	Czech Republic	2–1 GWS (1–0, 0–0, 0–1) (OT: 0–0) (SO: 1–0)	Sweden	Kajaanin jäähalli, Kajaani; Attendance: 195

Game reference
Michaela Hesová	Goalies	Felicia Frank
Šapovalivová – 13:53 / 1–0; / 1–1 / 50:04 – Sohrner (Ålenius, Hallin) (PP)
Šapovalivová (miss); Brichová (miss); Pištěková (miss); Mazancová; Juříčková (miss)	Shootout	(miss) Sohrner; (miss) Hallin; (miss) Rehn; (miss) Hedqvist; (miss) Andersson
8 min	Penalties	12 min
20	Shots	26

=== Final standings ===
Pos	Team	Pld	W	OTW	OTL	L	GF	GA	GD
1st place, gold medalist(s)	Czech Republic	3	2	1	0	0	10	2	+8
2nd place, silver medalist(s)	Sweden	3	1	1	1	0	8	6	+2
3rd place, bronze medalist(s)	Finland (H)	3	2	0	1	0	11	7	+4
4	Switzerland	3	1	0	0	2	7	9	–2
5	Slovakia	3	1	0	0	2	6	6	0
6	Hungary	3	0	0	0	3	0	12	–12

Source: Finnish Ice Hockey Association
(H) Host

=== Player statistics ===
==== Scoring leaders ====
List shows the top skaters sorted by points, then goals.

Rank	Nat	Player	GP	G	A	Pts	+/−	PIM	POS
1	(Finland)	Pauliina Salonen	3	4	2	6	+3	0	F
2	(Finland)	Tilli Keränen	3	2	4	6	+2	0	F
3	(Switzerland)	Chiara Eggli	3	3	1	4	±0	2	F
4	(Finland)	Sanni Vanhanen	2	2	2	4	+3	2	F
5	(Czech Republic)	Adéla Šapovalivová	3	2	2	4	+5	0	F
5	(Sweden)	Ebba Hedqvist	3	2	2	4	+1	2	F
7	(Slovakia)	Tatiana Blichová	3	3	0	3	+4	0	F
8	(Czech Republic)	Klaudie Slavíčková	3	2	1	3	+5	0	D
8	(Sweden)	Olivia Sohrner	3	2	1	3	+3	2	D
10	(Slovakia)	Emma Donovalová	3	1	2	3	+3	0	F
10	(Sweden)	Mira Hallin	3	1	2	3	±0	0	F
10	(Switzerland)	Annic Büchi	3	1	2	3	–1	2	F
10	(Switzerland)	Elena Gaberell	3	1	2	3	–2	4	D

GP = Games played; G = Goals; A = Assists; Pts = Points; +/− = Plus/minus; PIM = Penalties in minutes; POS = Position
Source: Finnish Ice Hockey Association

==== Leading goaltenders ====
Only the top five goaltenders, based on save percentage, who have played at least one third of their team's minutes, are included in this list.

Rank	Nat	Player	TOI	GA	GAA	SA	Sv%	SO
1	(Czech Republic)	Barbora Dalecká	60:00	0	0.00	14	100.0	1
2	(Czech Republic)	Michaela Hesová	140:00	2	0.86	39	95.1	0
3	(Finland)	Ronja Pätsi	60:00	1	1.00	19	95.0	0
4	(Slovakia)	Laura Medviďová	120:00	3	1.50	44	93.6	1
5	(Sweden)	Felicia Frank	201:11	6	1.79	60	90.9	0

TOI = Time on ice (minutes:seconds); SA = Shots against; GA = Goals against; GAA = Goals against average; Sv% = Save percentage; SO = Shutouts
Source: Finnish Ice Hockey Association
