= 2023 World Junior Ice Hockey Championships rosters =

Below are the rosters for teams competing in the 2023 World Junior Ice Hockey Championships.

== Group A ==
=== Austria ===
- Head coach: (Austria) Marco Pewal

Pos.	No.	Player	Team	League	NHL Rights
G	1	Benedikt Oschgan	(Austria) Black Wings Linz	(Austria) AUT	
G	29	Thomas Pfarrmaier	(Austria) EC Red Bull Salzburg	(Austria) AUT	
G	30	Michael Sicher	(Austria) EC KAC	(Austria) AUT	
D	3	Lukas Horl	(Austria) EC Red Bull Salzburg	(Austria) AUT	
D	4	Lorenz Lindner	(Austria) Black Wings Linz	(Austria) AUT	
D	5	David Reinbacher	(Switzerland) EHC Kloten	(Switzerland) NL	
D	9	Aron Summer	(Austria) VEU Feldkirch	(Austria) AUT	
D	12	Tobias Sablattnig	(Austria) EC KAC	(Austria) AUT	
D	16	Christoph Tialler	(Austria) EC KAC	(Austria) AUT	
D	28	Patrick Pfarrmaier	(Austria) Black Wings Linz	(Austria) AUT	
F	2	Jack Linton	(United States) Des Moines Buccaneers	(United States) USHL	
F	7	Luca Erne	(Austria) VEU Feldkirch	(Austria) AUT	
F	10	Max Stiegler	(Austria) EC Red Bull Salzburg	(Austria) AUT	
F	11	Johannes Tschurnig	(Austria) EC VSV	(Austria) AUT	
F	13	Luca Auer	(Austria) EC Red Bull Salzburg	(Austria) AUT	
F	14	Vinzenz Rohrer	(Canada) Ottawa 67s	(Canada) OHL	Montreal Canadiens
F	15	Finn van Ee	(Austria) EC KAC	(Austria) AUT	
F	17	Ian Scherzer	(Sweden) Rögle BK	(Sweden) SHL	
F	21	Tim Geifes	(Austria) EC VSV	(Austria) AUT	
F	22	David Cernik	(Austria) EC Red Bull Salzburg	(Austria) AUT	
F	23	Jonas Dobnig	(United States) New Jersey Rockets	(United States) USPHL	
F	26	Jakob Engelhart	(Austria) EA Steiermark	(Austria) AUT U20	
F	27	Stefan Klassek	(Austria) EC KAC	(Austria) AUT	

=== Canada ===
- Head coach: (Canada) Dennis Williams

Pos.	No.	Player	Team	League	NHL Rights
G	1	Thomas Milic	(United States) Seattle Thunderbirds	(Canada) WHL	
G	29	Benjamin Gaudreau	(Canada) Sarnia Sting	(Canada) OHL	San Jose Sharks
D	2	Nolan Allan	(United States) Seattle Thunderbirds	(Canada) WHL	Chicago Blackhawks
D	3	Olen Zellweger	(United States) Everett Silvertips	(Canada) WHL	Anaheim Ducks
D	4	Tyson Hinds	(Canada) Sherbrooke Phoenix	(Canada) QMJHL	Anaheim Ducks
D	5	Brandt Clarke	(United States) Los Angeles Kings	(United States) NHL	Los Angeles Kings
D	24	Ethan Del Mastro	(Canada) Mississauga Steelheads	(Canada) OHL	Chicago Blackhawks
D	25	Kevin Korchinski	(United States) Seattle Thunderbirds	(Canada) WHL	Chicago Blackhawks
D	27	Jack Matier	(Canada) Ottawa 67's	(Canada) OHL	Nashville Predators
F	7	Brennan Othmann	(Canada) Peterborough Petes	(Canada) OHL	New York Rangers
F	8	Owen Beck^{INJ}	(Canada) Mississauga Steelheads	(Canada) OHL	Montreal Canadiens
F	9	Joshua Roy	(Canada) Sherbrooke Phoenix	(Canada) QMJHL	Montreal Canadiens
F	10	Logan Stankoven	(Canada) Kamloops Blazers	(Canada) WHL	Dallas Stars
F	11	Dylan Guenther	(United States) Seattle Thunderbirds	(United States) WHL	Arizona Coyotes
F	12	Reid Schaefer	(United States) Seattle Thunderbirds	(Canada) WHL	Edmonton Oilers
F	14	Zach Dean	(Canada) Gatineau Olympiques	(Canada) QMJHL	Vegas Golden Knights
F	15	Shane Wright	(United States) Seattle Kraken	(United States) NHL	Seattle Kraken
F	16	Connor Bedard	(Canada) Regina Pats	(Canada) WHL	
F	17	Colton Dach^{INJ}	(Canada) Seattle Thunderbirds	(Canada) WHL	Chicago Blackhawks
F	18	Caedan Bankier	(Canada) Kamloops Blazers	(Canada) WHL	Minnesota Wild
F	19	Adam Fantilli	(United States) University of Michigan	(United States) NCAA	
F	20	Zack Ostapchuk	(Canada) Vancouver Giants	(Canada) WHL	Ottawa Senators
F	21	Nathan Gaucher	(Canada) Quebec Remparts	(Canada) QMJHL	Anaheim Ducks

INJ: Owen Beck was named as an injury replacement for Colton Dach midway through the tournament.

=== Czechia ===
- Head coach: (Czech Republic) Radim Rulík

Pos.	No.	Player	Team	League	NHL Rights
G	1	Daniel Král	(Czech Republic) HC Bílí Tygři Liberec	(Czech Republic) CZE	
G	29	Oliver Šatný	(Canada) Cape Breton Eagles	(Canada) QMJHL	
G	30	Tomáš Suchánek	(United States) Tri-City Americans	(Canada) WHL	
D	3	David Špaček	(Canada) Sherbrooke Phoenix	(Canada) QMJHL	Minnesota Wild
D	4	Jiří Ticháček	(Czech Republic) Rytíři Kladno	(Czech Republic) CZE	
D	5	David Jiříček	(United States) Cleveland Monsters	(United States) AHL	Columbus Blue Jackets
D	6	Aleš Čech	(Finland) Oulun Kärpät	(Finland) FIN	
D	8	David Moravec	(Canada) Halifax Mooseheads	(Canada) QMJHL	
D	9	Tomáš Hamara	(Canada) Kitchener Rangers	(Canada) OHL	Ottawa Senators
D	14	Stanislav Svozil	(Canada) Regina Pats	(Canada) WHL	Columbus Blue Jackets
F	11	Adam Měchura	(United States) Tri-City Americans	(Canada) WHL	
F	12	Jakub Brabenec	(Canada) Charlottetown Islanders	(Canada) QMJHL	Vegas Golden Knights
F	15	Jakub Kos	(Finland) Ilves	(Finland) FIN	Florida Panthers
F	16	Marcel Marcel	(Canada) Gatineau Olympiques	(Canada) QMJHL	
F	17	Petr Hauser	(Czech Republic) HC Sparta Praha	(Czech Republic) CZE	New Jersey Devils
F	18	Matouš Menšík	(Czech Republic) HC Olomouc	(Czech Republic) CZE	
F	20	Robin Sapoušek	(Czech Republic) HC Energie Karlovy Vary	(Czech Republic) CZE	
F	21	Jaroslav Chmelař	(United States) Providence College	(United States) NCAA	New York Rangers
F	24	Matyáš Šapovaliv	(United States) Saginaw Spirit	(Canada) OHL	Vegas Golden Knights
F	25	Jiří Kulich	(United States) Rochester Americans	(United States) AHL	Buffalo Sabres
F	26	Martin Ryšavý	(Canada) Moose Jaw Warriors	(Canada) WHL	Columbus Blue Jackets
F	27	Gabriel Szturc	(Canada) Kelowna Rockets	(Canada) WHL	
F	28	Eduard Šalé	(Czech Republic) HC Kometa Brno	(Czech Republic) CZE	

=== Germany ===
- Head coach: (Germany) Tobias Abstreiter

Pos.	No.	Player	Team	League	NHL Rights
G	1	Rihards Babulis	(Germany) EC Bad Nauheim	(Germany) DEL2	
G	29	Simon Wolf	(Austria) Red Bull Hockey Juniors	(Austria) ALPsHL	
G	30	Nikita Quapp	(Germany) Eisbären Berlin	(Germany) DEL	Carolina Hurricanes
D	2	Rayan Bettahar	(Germany) Eisbären Berlin	(Germany) DEL	
D	4	Philip Sinn	(Austria) Red Bull Hockey Juniors	(Austria) ALPsHL	
D	5	Nils Elten	(Germany) Iserlohn Roosters	(Germany) DEL	
D	12	Leon van der Linde	(Germany) ESV Kaufbeuren	(Germany) DEL2	
D	22	Philipp Bidoul	(Germany) ESV Kaufbeuren	(Germany) DEL2	
D	27	Julian Waser	(Germany) Lausitzer Füchse	(Germany) DEL2	
D	28	Adrian Klein	(Germany) Straubing Tigers	(Germany) DEL	
F	10	Yannick Proske	(Germany) Iserlohn Roosters	(Germany) DEL	
F	11	Philipp Krening	(Austria) Red Bull Hockey Juniors	(Austria) ALPsHL	
F	13	Nikolaus Heigl	(Austria) Red Bull Hockey Juniors	(Austria) ALPsHL	
F	14	Quirin Bader	(Austria) Red Bull Hockey Juniors	(Austria) ALPsHL	
F	15	Bennet Roßmy	(Germany) Eisbären Berlin	(Germany) DEL	
F	15	Luca Hauf	(Canada) Edmonton Oil Kings	(Canada) WHL	
F	18	Julian Lutz	(Germany) EHC Red Bull München	(Germany) DEL	Arizona Coyotes
F	19	Eric Hordler	(Germany) Eisbären Berlin	(Germany) DEL	
F	20	Veit Oswald	(Germany) EHC Red Bull München	(Germany) DEL	
F	21	Ryan del Monte	(Canada) London Knights	(Canada) OHL	
F	23	Thomas Heigl	(Austria) Red Bull Hockey Juniors	(Austria) ALPsHL	
F	24	Roman Kechter	(Germany) Nuremberg Ice Tigers	(Germany) DEL	
F	25	Robin van Calster	(Germany) Kölner Haie	(Germany) DEL	

=== Sweden ===
- Head coach: (Sweden) Magnus Hävelid

Pos.	No.	Player	Team	League	NHL Rights
G	1	Ian Blomquist	(Sweden) Västerås IK	(Sweden) SWE-2	
G	30	Marcus Brännman	(United States) Dubuque Fighting Saints	(United States) USHL	
G	35	Carl Lindbom	(Sweden) Djurgårdens IF	(Sweden) Allsv	Vegas Golden Knights
D	2	Elias Pettersson	(Sweden) Örebro HK	(Sweden) SHL	Vancouver Canucks
D	3	Hugo Jonasson	(Sweden) IK Oskarshamn	(Sweden) SHL	
D	4	Axel Sandin-Pellikka	(Sweden) Skellefteå AIK	(Sweden) SHL	
D	6	Victor Sjöholm	(Sweden) HV71	(Sweden) SHL	
D	7	Calle Odelius	(Sweden) Djurgårdens IF	(Sweden) SWE-2	New York Islanders
D	8	Adam Engström	(Sweden) Rögle BK	(Sweden) SHL	Montreal Canadiens
D	9	Ludvig Jansson	(Sweden) Södertälje SK	(Sweden) SWE-2	Florida Panthers
D	15	Jakob Norén	(Sweden) Modo Hockey	(Sweden) SWE-2	
F	10	Fabian Wagner	(Sweden) Linköping HC	(Sweden) SHL	Winnipeg Jets
F	11	Fabian Lysell	(United States) Providence Bruins	(United States) AHL	Boston Bruins
F	12	Noah Östlund	(Sweden) Djurgårdens IF	(Sweden) SWE-2	Buffalo Sabres
F	18	Filip Bystedt	(Sweden) Linköping HC	(Sweden) SHL	San Jose Sharks
F	19	Isak Rosén	(United States) Rochester Americans	(United States) AHL	Buffalo Sabres
F	20	Liam Öhgren	(Sweden) Djurgårdens IF	(Sweden) SWE-2	Minnesota Wild
F	21	Leo Carlsson	(Sweden) Örebro HK	(Sweden) SHL	
F	23	William Strömgren	(Sweden) Brynäs IF	(Sweden) SHL	Calgary Flames
F	24	Jonathan Lekkerimäki	(Sweden) Djurgårdens IF	(Sweden) Allsv	Vancouver Canucks
F	25	Milton Oscarson	(Sweden) Örebro HK	(Sweden) SHL	
F	26	Victor Stjernborg	(Sweden) Växjö Lakers	(Sweden) SHL	Chicago Blackhawks
F	27	Oskar Pettersson	(Sweden) Rögle BK	(Sweden) SHL	Ottawa Senators
F	28	Simon Robertsson	(Sweden) Skellefteå AIK	(Sweden) SHL	St. Louis Blues

== Group B ==
=== Finland ===
- Head coach: (Finland) Tomi Lämsä

Pos.	No.	Player	Team	League	NHL Rights
G	1	Nikke Kokko	(Finland) Oulun Kärpät	(Finland) FIN	Seattle Kraken
G	30	Aku Koskenvuo	(United States) Harvard University	(United States) ECAC	Vancouver Canucks
G	31	Jani Lampinen	(Finland) Kiekko-Espoo	(Finland) FIN-2	
D	3	Otto Salin	(Finland) HIFK	(Finland) FIN	Los Angeles Kings
D	4	Ville Ruotsalainen	(Finland) KalPa	(Finland) FIN	
D	6	Kalle Ervasti	(Finland) Lukko	(Finland) FIN	
D	7	Aleksi Malinen	(Finland) JYP Jyväskylä	(Finland) FIN	New York Islanders
D	10	Topias Vilen	(Finland) Pelicans Lahti	(Finland) FIN	New Jersey Devils
D	21	Aleksi Heimosalmi	(Finland) Porin Ässät	(Finland) FIN	Carolina Hurricanes
F	13	Topi Ronni	(Finland) Tappara	(Finland) FIN	Calgary Flames
F	15	Lenni Hameenaho	(Finland) Porin Ässät	(Finland) FIN	
F	18	Verner Miettinen	(United States) Fargo Force	(United States) USHL	
F	22	Jani Nyman	(Finland) Ilves	(Finland) FIN	Seattle Kraken
F	23	Kalle Väisänen	(Finland) TPS	(Finland) FIN	New York Rangers
F	24	Ville Koivunen	(Finland) Oulun Kärpät	(Finland) FIN	Carolina Hurricanes
F	25	Konsta Kapanen	(Finland) KalPa	(Finland) FIN	
F	27	Oliver Kapanen	(Finland) KalPa	(Finland) FIN	Montreal Canadiens
F	28	Sami Paivarinta	(Finland) Lukko	(Finland) FIN	
F	29	Niko Huuhtanen	(Finland) Mikkelin Jukurit	(Finland) FIN	Tampa Bay Lightning
F	33	Brad Lambert	(Canada) Manitoba Moose	(Canada) AHL	Winnipeg Jets
F	34	Aleksanteri Kaskimaki	(Finland) HIFK	(Finland) FIN	St. Louis Blues
F	37	Joakim Kemell	(Finland) JYP Jyväskylä	(Finland) FIN	Nashville Predators

=== Latvia ===
- Head coach: (Latvia) Artis Ābols

Pos.	No.	Player	Team	League	NHL Rights
G	1	Linards Lipskis	(United States) Bismarck Bobcats	(United States) NAHL	
G	29	Kārlis Mežsargs	(United States) Tri-City Storm	(United States) USHL	
G	30	Patriks Bērziņš	(United States) Danbury Jr. Hat Tricks	(United States) NA3HL	
D	3	Rihards Simanovičs	(United States) Amarillo Wranglers	(United States) NAHL	
D	4	Niks Feņenko	(Canada) Baie-Comeau Drakkar	(Canada) QMJHL	
D	5	Silvers Lazarenoks	(Latvia) HK Zemgale/LLU	(Latvia) LAT	
D	9	Gustavs Ozoliņš	(United States) Minnesota Wilderness	(United States) NAHL	
D	16	Dario Mackevičs	(Latvia) HK Mogo	(Latvia) LAT	
D	17	Bogdans Hodass	(Canada) Medicine Hat Tigers	(Canada) WHL	
F	28	Edgars Kazaks	(Latvia) HK Zemgale/LLU	(Latvia) LAT	
F	6	Martins Laviņš	(United States) Cedar Rapids Roughriders	(United States) USHL	
F	7	Rainers Rullers	(Latvia) HK Zemgale/LLU	(Latvia) LAT	
F	10	Emīls Veckaktiņš	(Switzerland) HC Lugano	(Switzerland) NL	
F	11	Dans Ločmelis	(Sweden) Luleå HF	(Sweden) SHL	Boston Bruins
F	12	Roberts Cjunskis	(Switzerland) HC Lugano	(Switzerland) NL	
F	14	Rainers Dārziņš	(Sweden) Skellefteå AIK	(Sweden) SHL	
F	15	Ģirts Silkalns	(United States) Fargo Force	(United States) USHL	
F	19	Darels Dukurs	(Switzerland) SCL Tigers	(Switzerland) NL	
F	20	Pēteris Purmalis	(Latvia) HK Zemgale/LLU	(Latvia) LAT	
F	21	Anrī Ravinskis	(Canada) Blainville-Boisbriand Armada	(Canada) QMJHL	
F	22	Sandis Vilmanis	(Canada) Sarnia Sting	(Canada) OHL	Florida Panthers
F	23	Rodžers Bukarts	(Switzerland) ZSC Lions	(Switzerland) NL	
F	27	Klāvs Veinbergs	(United States) Lincoln Stars	(United States) USHL	Tampa Bay Lightning

=== Slovakia ===
- Head coach: (Slovakia) Ivan Feneš

Pos.	No.	Player	Team	League	NHL Rights
G	1	Patrik Andrisík	(Slovakia) HK Brezno	(Slovakia) SVK-2	
G	29	Matej Marinov	(United States) Fargo Force	(United States) USHL	
G	30	Adam Gajan	(United States) Green Bay Gamblers	(United States) USHL	
D	3	Šimon Bečár	(United States) Corpus Christi IceRays	(United States) NAHL	
D	4	Maxim Štrbák	(United States) Sioux Falls Stampede	(United States) USHL	
D	5	Dávid Nátny	(Slovakia) HC 21 Prešov	(Slovakia) SVK	
D	7	Šimon Nemec	(United States) Utica Comets	(United States) AHL	New Jersey Devils
D	12	Pavol Funtek	(Finland) Imatran Ketterä	(Finland) FIN-2	
D	16	Šimon Groch	(Slovakia) HK Spišská Nová Ves	(Slovakia) SVK	
F	9	Adam Žlnka	(United States) Sioux Falls Stampede	(United States) USHL	Arizona Coyotes
F	10	Filip Mešár	(Canada) Kitchener Rangers	(Canada) OHL	Montreal Canadiens
F	13	Róbert Bačo	(Canada) Moose Jaw Warriors	(Canada) WHL	
F	14	Adam Sýkora	(Slovakia) HK Nitra	(Slovakia) SVK	New York Rangers
F	15	Dalibor Dvorský	(Sweden) AIK	(Sweden) SWE-2	
F	18	Servác Petrovský	(Canada) Owen Sound Attack	(Canada) OHL	Minnesota Wild
F	19	Samuel Honzek	(Canada) Vancouver Giants	(Canada) WHL	
F	20	Libor Nemec	(Finland) Lukko	(Finland) FIN	
F	21	Peter Repčík	(Canada) Charlottetown Islanders	(Canada) QMJHL	
F	22	Alex Čiernik	(Sweden) Södertälje SK	(Sweden) SWE-2	
F	25	František Dej	(Slovakia) Slovan Bratislava	(Slovakia) SVK	
F	26	Marcel Štefančík	(Sweden) Luleå HF	(Sweden) SHL	

=== Switzerland ===
- Head coach: (Switzerland) Marco Bayer

Pos.	No.	Player	Team	League	NHL Rights
G	1	Alessio Beglieri	(Canada) Mississauga Steelheads	(Canada) OHL	
G	29	Mathieu Croce	(Switzerland) HC Davos	(Switzerland) NL	
G	30	Kevin Pasche	(United States) Omaha Lancers	(United States) USHL	
D	4	Rodwin Dionicio	(Canada) Niagara IceDogs	(Canada) OHL	
D	5	Nick Meile	(Switzerland) SC Bern	(Switzerland) NL	
D	9	Brian Zanetti	(Canada) Peterborough Petes	(Canada) OHL	Philadelphia Flyers
D	20	Lian Bichsel	(Sweden) Leksands IF	(Sweden) SHL	Dallas Stars
D	21	Dario Sidler	(Switzerland) Lausanne HC	(Switzerland) NL	
D	22	Vincent Despont	(Canada) Saint John Sea Dogs	(Canada) QMJHL	
D	28	Maximilian Streule	(Canada) Blainville-Boisbriand Armada	(Canada) QMJHL	
F	9	Mischa Ramel	(Switzerland) EHC Kloten	(Switzerland) NL	
F	8	Mats Alge	(Switzerland) SC Rapperswil-Jona Lakers	(Switzerland) NL	
F	10	Jonas Taibel	(Canada) Moncton Wildcats	(Canada) QMJHL	
F	11	Jeremy Jabola	(Switzerland) SC Bern	(Switzerland) NL	
F	13	Louis Robin	(Canada) Val d'Or Foreurs	(Canada) QMJHL	
F	14	Lorenzo Canonica	(Canada) Shawinigan Cataractes	(Canada) QMJHL	
F	16	Livio Truog	(Switzerland) ZSC Lions	(Switzerland) NL	
F	17	Attilo Biasca	(Canada) Halifax Mooseheads	(Canada) QMJHL	
F	18	Nicolas Baechler	(Switzerland) ZSC Lions	(Switzerland) NL	
F	19	Nicolas Perrenoud	(Switzerland) Lausanne HC	(Switzerland) NL	
F	24	Liekit Reichle	(Switzerland) ZSC Lions	(Switzerland) NL	
F	27	Miles Müller	(Canada) Moncton Wildcats	(Canada) QMJHL	

=== United States ===
- Head coach: (United States) Rand Pecknold

Pos.	No.	Player	Team	League	NHL Rights
G	1	Trey Augustine	United States NTDP	(United States) USHL	
G	29	Andrew Oke	(United States) Saginaw Spirit	(Canada) OHL	
G	30	Kaidan Mbereko	(United States) Colorado College	(United States) NCHC	
D	6	Ryan Ufko	(United States) University of Massachusetts	(United States) HE	Nashville Predators
D	12	Sean Behrens	(United States) University of Denver	(United States) NCHC	Colorado Avalanche
D	20	Lane Hutson	(United States) Boston University	(United States) HE	Montreal Canadiens
D	21	Luke Mittelstadt	(United States) University of Minnesota	(United States) B1G	
D	23	Jack Peart	(United States) St. Cloud State University	(United States) NCHC	Minnesota Wild
D	24	Seamus Casey	(United States) University of Michigan	(United States) B1G	New Jersey Devils
D	43	Luke Hughes	(United States) University of Michigan	(United States) B1G	New Jersey Devils
D	71	Ryan Chesley	(United States) University of Minnesota	(United States) B1G	Washington Capitals
F	2	Rutger McGroarty	(United States) University of Michigan	(United States) B1G	Winnipeg Jets
F	5	Gavin Brindley	(United States) University of Michigan	(United States) B1G	
F	9	Jackson Blake	(United States) University of North Dakota	(United States) NCHC	Carolina Hurricanes
F	13	Tyler Boucher	(Canada) Ottawa 67's	(Canada) OHL	Ottawa Senators
F	16	Chaz Lucius	(Canada) Manitoba Moose	(United States) AHL	Winnipeg Jets
F	17	Cutter Gauthier	(United States) Boston College	(United States) HE	Philadelphia Flyers
F	18	Jimmy Snuggerud	(United States) University of Minnesota	(United States) B1G	St. Louis Blues
F	19	Red Savage	(United States) Miami University	(United States) NCHC	Detroit Red Wings
F	22	Sam Lipkin	(United States) Quinnipiac University	(United States) ECAC	Arizona Coyotes
F	25	Dylan Duke	(United States) University of Michigan	(United States) B1G	Tampa Bay Lightning
F	26	Noah Laba	(United States) Colorado College	(United States) NCHC	New York Rangers
F	27	Kenny Connors	(United States) University of Massachusetts	(United States) HE	Los Angeles Kings
F	28	Charlie Stramel	(United States) University of Wisconsin	(United States) B1G	
F	92	Logan Cooley	(United States) University of Minnesota	(United States) B1G	Arizona Coyotes
