= Adéla Šapovalivová =

Czech ice hockey player (born 2006)

- Born: 17 May 2006 (age 20) Prague, Czech Republic
- Height: 1.61 m (5 ft 3 in)
- Weight: 58 kg (128 lb; 9 st 2 lb)
- Position: Left wing
- Shoots: Left
- WCHA team Former teams: Wisconsin Badgers; HC Příbram; MoDo Hockey
- National team: Czech Republic
- Playing career: 2020–present
Medal record
World Championship
Bronze medal – third place	2022 Denmark
Bronze medal – third place	2023 Canada

Adéla Šapovalivová (born 17 May 2006) is a Czech ice hockey player who is a left wing for the Wisconsin Badgers of the National Collegiate Athletic Association (NCAA) and the Czech national team.

== Playing career ==
From around age three, Šapovalivová regularly attended her brother's ice hockey practices and games. When he outgrew his equipment, she told her parents that she would like to play, too, and reused his gear for herself. She developed as a player on boys' teams in the junior department of HC Berounští Medvědi. At age fourteen, she played four games with the club's U17 team in the Liga dorostu, the Czech second-tier men's U17 league, during the 2019–20 season and recorded a goal.

Though she continued to spend most of her time with the boys' teams of HC Berouští Medvědi, the 2020–21 season marked the first time she played in the Czech Women's Extraliga (Extraliga žen) with a senior women's team and she notched a goal and 2 assists in two games with HC Příbram.

In the 2021–22 season, she played eight games with HC Příbram in which she tallied 11 goals and 8 assists for 19 points and remained a regular in the lineup for HC Berouští Medvědi U17 during the 2021–22 Liga dorostu season.

Šapovalivová stayed with HC Berounští Medvědi U17 as the team was relegated to the Regionální liga dorostu, the third-tier men's U17 league, for the 2022–23 season. That season, she also played six games with HC Berounští Medvědi U15 in the Soutěž 9. tříd (or Extraliga 9. tříd), the Czech premier men's U15 league, recording 8 goals and 12 points. Returning to HC Příbram, she tallied 6 goals and 12 points in two Czech Women's Extraliga games during the regular season and contributed 3 goals and 9 points in three playoff games, as the team claimed the league championship for the third consecutive season.

In May 2023, she signed a one-season contract (with an additional one-season option) with MoDo Hockey in the Swedish Women's Hockey League (SDHL). Czech national team teammate Vendula Přibylová was already under contract with MoDo when Šapovalivová signed and joked she would be "starting babysitting in August" in reference to the players' ten-year age gap. Finishing the 2023–24 season with 29 points in 32 games and making a run to the finals of the SDHL championship series, Šapovalivová was named the league's rookie of the year.

=== Collegiate ===
Šapovalivová joined the Wisconsin Badgers for the 2025–26 season. She was chosen as the WCHA Preseason Rookie of the Year, receiving four out of eight votes from WCHA coaches.

=== Speed skating ===
Šapovalivová represented the Central Bohemian Region (Středočeský kraj) in speed skating at the Winter Olympics for children and youth of the Czech Republic (Czech: Zimní olympiády dětí a mládeže České republiky) in 2018 and 2020. In 2018, she won bronze medals at the junior girls level in the 111 meter and 333 meter distances and a gold medal in the girls 16-lap relay. In 2020, competing at the senior girls level, she won a bronze medal in the 333 meter distance, silver in the 500 meter distance, and gold in the girls 16-lap relay.

== International play ==
Šapovalivová played with the Czech women's national under-16 ice hockey team during the 2019–20 season, recording 20 (10+10) points in 14 games. The COVID-19 pandemic, which was declared a global pandemic by the WHO in March 2020, limited the number of opportunities for women to play at the international junior level during 2020 and 2021, and, as a result, Šapovalivová did not participate in any national team matches during the 2020–21 season.

After more than a season away from international competition, Šapovalivová broke onto the scene in 2022. Her first international tournament since 2020 was the girls' ice hockey tournament at the 2022 European Youth Olympic Winter Festival in March 2022, where the Czech women's national under-17 ice hockey team claimed gold. With 2 goals and 2 assists in three games, she was Czechia's leading scorer and tied Sanni Vanhanen of Finland for fourth in scoring of all players at the tournament.

Her debut with the national U18 team at the 2022 IIHF U18 Women's World Championship was an attention-grabbing continuation of her breakout season. Šapovalivová tallied 3 goals and 6 assists for 9 points in five games, ranking second of all tournament skaters for scoring. She trailed leading scorer and teammate Tereza Plosová by just one assist and besting third-ranked scorer and tournament MVP Laila Edwards of the United States by a point. Though Czechia missed the medal table and finished in fifth place, Šapovalivová was named to the Media All-Star Team; she was the only player from a non-medaling team to be so honoured. Having showcased her speed and doggedness throughout the tournament, she began to draw attention as a player of note both at home and abroad.

The 2022 IIHF Women's World Championship in August 2022 served as her debut with the senior national team and she was the youngest player at the tournament (two months younger than the second-youngest player, Kohane Sato of Japan). Head coach Carla MacLeod slotted Šapovalivová onto Czechia's top line alongside Kateřina Mrázová and Natálie Mlýnková, giving a tremendous opportunity to the young player. Regarding Šapovalivová's youth in relation to her placement in the lineup, MacLeod said, "She’s just offensively gifted... If you don’t have the birthdate beside the name, I don’t think you guess her age. She plays with a very mature game… With a high, high level of confidence."

The sixteen year old demonstrated herself worthy of the top line role in her first game, scoring two goals and notching an assist in a 7–1 victory over Hungary. In Czechia's match against Denmark, their second game of the preliminary round, Šapovalivová did not record a point despite logging six shots on goal; the Czech's claimed victory regardless, beating Denmark 5–1. Preliminary game three against Germany saw Šapovalivová open up the scoring with a power play goal in the thirteenth minute of the first period, assisted by Daniela Pejšová and Mrázová; Czechia ultimately lit the lamp six times to capture their first shutout win of the tournament and secured placement in the quarterfinals. When asked about Šapovalivová's performance through the third game of the tournament, Czech captain Alena Mills praised, "Šapi plays amazingly. I'm glad she got the chance because she deserves it, which she has shown here."

At 2024 IIHF World Women's U18 Championship, Šapovalivova continued her strong play, serving as captain en route to the Czech team's first silver medal at the junior or senior level. She finished the tournament tied for second overall in scoring, with 11 points (9 goals, 2 assists). She was named to the media all-star team, and won the directorate award for best forward.

== Personal life ==
Šapovalivová's older brother, Matyáš Šapovaliv, is also an ice hockey player, a centre. He was drafted in the second round, 48th overall by the Vegas Golden Knights in the 2022 NHL entry draft, and, as of June 2023, he has represented Czechia at two IIHF World U18 Championships with the national U18 team and at the World Junior Ice Hockey Championships with the national U20 team in 2022, 2023, and 2024. Matyáš describes Adéla as having a "killer instinct" when it comes to goal scoring, highlighting her tendency to shoot (and score) when in front of the goal.

Šapovalivová has expressed interest in pursuing a college ice hockey career in the United States.

== Career statistics ==
=== Regular season and playoffs ===
			Regular season					Playoffs
Season	Team	League	GP	G	A	Pts	PIM	GP	G	A	Pts	PIM
2020–21	HC Příbram	Extraliga žen	2	1	2	3	0	—	—	—	—	—
2021–22	HC Příbram	Extraliga žen	8	11	8	19	2	1	0	0	0	0
2022–23	HC Příbram	Extraliga žen	2	6	6	12	0	3	3	6	9	0
2023–24	MoDo Hockey	SDHL	32	11	18	29	6	10	1	6	7	4
SDHL totals			32	11	18	29	6	10	1	6	7	4

=== International ===
Year	Team	Event	Result	GP	G	A	Pts	PIM
2022	Czechia	U18	5th	5	3	6	9	2
2022	Czechia	WC	3rd place, bronze medalist(s)	7	3	1	4	8
2023	Czechia	U18	5th	5	4	2	6	2
2023	Czechia	WC	3rd place, bronze medalist(s)	7	2	0	2	2
2024	Czechia	U18	2nd place, silver medalist(s)	6	9	2	11	2
2024	Czechia	WC	4th	7	1	2	3	4
2025	Czechia	WC	4th	7	1	2	3	2
2026	Czechia	OG	5th	5	0	1	1	0
Junior totals				16	16	10	26	6
Senior totals				33	7	6	13	16

== Awards and honours ==
Award	Year	Ref
Extraliga žen
League Champion	2022, 2023	
Most goals	2022	
SDHL
Rookie of the Year	2024	
International
U18 World Championship Media All-Star Team	2022, 2024	
World Championship Bronze Medal	2022, 2023	
U18 World Championship Silver Medal	2024	
U18 World Championship Best Forward	2024	
