= 2021–22 FIS Cup (ski jumping) =

FIS Cup 2021/22
Discipline	Men	Women
Overall	(Austria) Francisco Mörth	(Switzerland) Sina Arnet

Competition
Edition	17th	10th
Locations	12	11
Individual	23	21
Cancelled	9	3

The 2021/22 FIS Cup (ski jumping) was the 17th FIS Cup season in ski jumping for men and the 10th for women.

Other competitive circuits this season include the World Cup, Grand Prix, Continental Cup, FIS Race and Alpen Cup.

== Calendar ==
=== Men ===
NH – normal hill / LH – large hill
#	Date	Place	Hill	Size	Winner	Second	Third	Yellow bib	R.
1	3 July 2021	(Estonia) Otepää	Tehvandi HS97	NH	(Austria) Mika Schwann	(Germany) Luca Roth	(Germany) Justin Lisso	(Austria) Mika Schwann	
2	4 July 2021	(Estonia) Otepää	Tehvandi HS97	NH	(Austria) Mika Schwann	(Germany) Justin Lisso	(Germany) Luca Roth	(Austria) Mika Schwann	
3	15 July 2021	(Finland) Kuopio (Note: The competition organized by Chinese Ski Association at the Finnish hill.)	Puijo HS100	NH	(Austria) Thomas Lackner	(Austria) Mika Schwann	(Austria) Clemens Leitner	(Austria) Mika Schwann	
4	16 July 2021	(Finland) Kuopio	Puijo HS127	LH	(Finland) Eetu Nousiainen	(Germany) Philipp Raimund	(Austria) Mika Schwann	(Austria) Mika Schwann	
5	28 August 2021	(Switzerland) Einsiedeln	Andreas Küttel Schanze HS117	LH	(Austria) Thomas Diethart	(Austria) Clemens Aigner	(Germany) Felix Hoffmann	(Austria) Mika Schwann	
6	29 August 2021	(Switzerland) Einsiedeln	Andreas Küttel Schanze HS117	LH	(Austria) Clemens Aigner	(Germany) Felix Hoffmann	(Austria) Thomas Diethart	(Austria) Mika Schwann	
7	4 September 2021	(Slovenia) Ljubno	Savina Ski Jumping Center HS91	NH	(Austria) Janni Reisenauer	(Slovenia) Maksim Bartolj (Austria) Julijan Smid		(Austria) Mika Schwann	
8	5 September 2021	(Slovenia) Ljubno	Savina Ski Jumping Center HS91	NH	(Austria) Francisco Mörth	(Slovenia) Maksim Bartolj	(Poland) Jan Habdas	(Austria) Mika Schwann	
9	18 September 2021	(Austria) Villach	Villacher Alpenarena HS98	NH	(Austria) Janni Reisenauer	(Slovenia) Maksim Bartolj	(Austria) Thomas Lackner	(Austria) Mika Schwann	
10	19 September 2021	(Austria) Villach	Villacher Alpenarena HS98	NH	(Austria) Janni Reisenauer	(Austria) Francisco Mörth	(Austria) Thomas Diethart	(Austria) Francisco Mörth	
11	25 September 2021	(Finland) Lahti	Salpausselkä HS100	NH	(Austria) Andre Fussenegger	(Germany) Felix Hoffmann	(Austria) Janni Reisenauer	(Austria) Francisco Mörth	
12	26 September 2021	(Finland) Lahti	Salpausselkä HS100	NH	(Austria) Andre Fussenegger	(Germany) Felix Hoffmann	(Poland) Jan Habdas	(Austria) Janni Reisenauer	
	25 September 2021	(South Korea) Pyeongchang	Alpensia Ski Jumping Centre HS109	NH	Cancelled due to organizational problems				
	26 September 2021	(South Korea) Pyeongchang	Alpensia Ski Jumping Centre HS109	NH	Cancelled due to organizational problems				
	2 October 2021	(France) Chaux-Neuve	La Côté Feuillée HS60	NH	Cancelled due to organizational problems				
	3 October 2021	(France) Chaux-Neuve	La Côté Feuillée HS60	NH	Cancelled due to organizational problems				
	9 October 2021	(France) Courchevel	Tremplin du Praz HS96	NH	Cancelled due to organizational problems				
	10 October 2021	(France) Courchevel	Tremplin du Praz HS135	LH	Cancelled due to organizational problems				
13	13 November 2021	(Sweden) Falun	Lugnet HS100	NH	(Austria) Peter Resinger	(Austria) Francisco Mörth	(Germany) Justin Lisso	(Austria) Francisco Mörth	
14	14 November 2021	(Sweden) Falun	Lugnet HS100	NH	(Austria) Maximilian Ortner	(Austria) Clemens Aigner (Poland) Jan Habdas		(Austria) Francisco Mörth	
15	11 December 2021	(Switzerland) Kandersteg	Nordic Arena HS106	NH	(Austria) Francisco Mörth	(Austria) Timon-Pascal Kahofer	(Austria) Clemens Aigner	(Austria) Francisco Mörth	
16	12 December 2021	(Switzerland) Kandersteg	Nordic Arena HS106	NH	(Austria) Elias Medwed	(Austria) Clemens Aigner	(Austria) Francisco Mörth	(Austria) Francisco Mörth	
17	17 December 2021	(Norway) Notodden	Tveitanbakken HS98	NH	(Austria) Clemens Aigner	(Austria) Francisco Mörth	(Austria) Hannes Landerer	(Austria) Francisco Mörth	
18	18 December 2021	(Norway) Notodden	Tveitanbakken HS98	NH	(Austria) Clemens Aigner	(Austria) Markus Rupitsch	(Austria) Mika Schwann	(Austria) Francisco Mörth	
	8 January 2022	(Poland) Zakopane	Wielka Krokiew HS140	LH	Cancelled due to warm weather				
	9 January 2022	(Poland) Zakopane	Wielka Krokiew HS140	LH	Cancelled due to warm weather				
19	29 January 2022	(Poland) Zakopane	Średnia Krokiew HS105	NH	(Austria) Jonas Schuster	(Austria) Niklas Bachlinger	(Slovenia) Mark Hafnar	(Austria) Francisco Mörth	
	30 January 2022	(Poland) Zakopane	Średnia Krokiew HS105	NH	Cancelled due to strong wind				
20	19 February 2022	(Austria) Villach	Villacher Alpenarena HS98	NH	(Austria) Janni Reisenauer	(Austria) Stefan Rainer	(Austria) Marco Wörgötter	(Austria) Francisco Mörth	
21	20 February 2022	(Austria) Villach	Villacher Alpenarena HS98	NH	(Austria) Janni Reisenauer	(Slovenia) Patrik Vitez	(Austria) Stefan Rainer	(Austria) Francisco Mörth	
22	26 February 2022	(Germany) Oberhof	Kanzlersgrund HS100	NH	(Germany) Claudio Haas	(Austria) Mika Schwann	(Austria) Clemens Leitner	(Austria) Francisco Mörth	
23	27 February 2022	(Germany) Oberhof	Kanzlersgrund HS100	NH	(Austria) Mika Schwann	(Austria) Clemens Leitner	(Austria) Markus Rupitsch	(Austria) Francisco Mörth	

=== Women ===
NH – normal hill / LH – large hill
#	Date	Place	Hill	Size	Winner	Second	Third	Yellow bib	R.
1	3 July 2021	(Estonia) Otepää	Tehvandi HS97	NH	(Russia) Mariia Iakovleva	(Finland) Jenny Rautionaho	(China) Bing Dong	(Russia) Mariia Iakovleva	
2	4 July 2021	(Estonia) Otepää	Tehvandi HS97	NH	(Russia) Mariia Iakovleva	(China) Bing Dong	(Finland) Jenny Rautionaho	(Russia) Mariia Iakovleva	
3	15 July 2021	(Finland) Kuopio	Puijo HS100	NH	(China) Birun Shao	(Austria) Julia Mühlbacher	(Austria) Hannah Wiegele	(Russia) Mariia Iakovleva	
4	16 July 2021	(Finland) Kuopio	Puijo HS100	NH	(Austria) Hannah Wiegele	(Austria) Julia Mühlbacher	(China) Bing Dong	(China) Bing Dong	
5	26 August 2021	(France) Gérardmer	Tremplin des Bas-Rupts HS75	NH	(France) Josephine Pagnier	(France) Julia Clair	(Japan) Yuka Seto	(China) Bing Dong	
6	27 August 2021	(France) Gérardmer	Tremplin des Bas-Rupts HS75	NH	(France) Julia Clair	(Japan) Yuka Seto	(France) Josephine Pagnier	(China) Bing Dong	
7	28 August 2021	(Switzerland) Einsiedeln	Andreas Küttel Schanze HS117	LH	(Switzerland) Sina Arnet	(Austria) Julia Mühlbacher	(Germany) Josephin Laue	(China) Bing Dong	
8	29 August 2021	(Switzerland) Einsiedeln	Andreas Küttel Schanze HS117	LH	(Switzerland) Sina Arnet	(Austria) Julia Mühlbacher	(Germany) Josephin Laue	(Austria) Julia Mühlbacher	
9	4 September 2021	(Slovenia) Ljubno	Savina Ski Jumping Center HS91	NH	(Slovenia) Nika Križnar	(Slovenia) Špela Rogelj	(Slovenia) Jerneja Brecl	(Austria) Julia Mühlbacher	
10	5 September 2021	(Slovenia) Ljubno	Savina Ski Jumping Center HS91	NH	(China) Qingyue Peng	(Austria) Hannah Wiegele	(Slovenia) Jerneja Repinc Zupančič	(Austria) Julia Mühlbacher	
11	18 September 2021	(Austria) Villach	Villacher Alpenarena HS98	NH	(Slovenia) Nika Prevc	(Italy) Lara Malsiner	(Slovenia) Jerneja Repinc Zupančič	(Austria) Julia Mühlbacher	
12	19 September 2021	(Austria) Villach	Villacher Alpenarena HS98	NH	(Italy) Lara Malsiner	(China) Qingyue Peng	(Czech Republic) Klára Ulrichová	(Austria) Julia Mühlbacher (China) Qingyue Peng	
	25 September 2021	(South Korea) Pyeongchang	Alpensia Ski Jumping Centre HS109	NH	Cancelled due to organizational problems				
	26 September 2021	(South Korea) Pyeongchang	Alpensia Ski Jumping Centre HS109	NH	Cancelled due to organizational problems				
13	13 November 2021	(Sweden) Falun	Lugnet HS100	NH	(Russia) Irina Avvakumova	(Russia) Irma Makhinia	(Russia) Aleksandra Kustova	(Austria) Julia Mühlbacher (China) Qingyue Peng	
14	14 November 2021	(Sweden) Falun	Lugnet HS100	NH	(Russia) Irina Avvakumova	(Russia) Aleksandra Kustova	(Russia) Sofia Tikhonova	(Austria) Julia Mühlbacher (China) Qingyue Peng	
15	11 December 2021	(Switzerland) Kandersteg	Nordic Arena HS106	NH	(France) Emma Chervet	(Italy) Martina Ambrosi	(Russia) Kseniia Piskunova	(Austria) Julia Mühlbacher (China) Qingyue Peng	
16	12 December 2021	(Switzerland) Kandersteg	Nordic Arena HS106	NH	(France) Emma Chervet	(Switzerland) Sina Arnet	(Germany) Anna-Fay Scharfenberg	(Austria) Julia Mühlbacher (China) Qingyue Peng	
17	29 January 2022	(Poland) Zakopane	Średnia Krokiew HS105	NH	(Austria) Sophie Sorschag	(Slovenia) Taja Bodlaj	(Italy) Lara Malsiner	(Austria) Julia Mühlbacher	
	30 January 2022	(Poland) Zakopane	Średnia Krokiew HS105	NH	Cancelled due to strong wind				
18	19 February 2022	(Austria) Villach	Villacher Alpenarena HS98	NH	(Russia) Irina Avvakumova	(Italy) Lara Malsiner	(Slovenia) Taja Bodlaj	(Austria) Julia Mühlbacher	
19	20 February 2022	(Austria) Villach	Villacher Alpenarena HS98	NH	(Russia) Irina Avvakumova	(Japan) Nagomi Nakayama	(Russia) Irma Makhinia	(Austria) Julia Mühlbacher	
20	26 February 2022	(Germany) Oberhof	Kanzlersgrund HS100	NH	(United States) Anna Hoffmann	(Switzerland) Sina Arnet (United States) Annika Belshaw		(Switzerland) Sina Arnet	
21	27 February 2022	(Germany) Oberhof	Kanzlersgrund HS100	NH	(Poland) Anna Twardosz	(United States) Annika Belshaw	(Switzerland) Sina Arnet	(Switzerland) Sina Arnet	

== Overall standings ==
=== Men ===
Rank	after all 23 events	Points
1	(Austria) Francisco Mörth	817
2	(Austria) Mika Schwann	756
3	(Austria) Janni Reisenauer	650
4	(Austria) Clemens Aigner	636
5	(Poland) Jan Habdas	536

=== Women ===
Rank	after all 21 events	Points
1	(Switzerland) Sina Arnet	514
2	(Austria) Julia Mühlbacher	451
3	(Italy) Lara Malsiner	426
4	(Russia) Irina Avvakumova	400
5	(Austria) Hannah Wiegele	376
