= Ski jumping at the 2022 European Youth Olympic Winter Festival =

- Venue: Lahti Sports Center
- Date: 23–25 March
- Website: eyof2022.fi

Ski jumping at the 2022 European Youth Olympic Winter Festival was held from 23 to 25 March at Lahti Sports Center in Lahti, Finland.

== Competition schedule ==
Date	Time	Event
23 March	16:30	Boys' individual HS100
24 March	10:00	Girls' individual HS100
24 March	17:00	Boys' team HS100
25 March	10:00	Mixed team HS100
Source: All times are (UTC+2)

== Medal summary ==
=== Medal table ===
* Host nation (Finland)

Rank	Nation	Gold	Silver	Bronze	Total
1	Austria (AUT)	2	1	0	3
2	Slovenia (SLO)	2	0	0	2
3	Poland (POL)	0	2	0	2
4	Norway (NOR)	0	1	0	1
5	Germany (GER)	0	0	2	2
5	Switzerland (SUI)	0	0	2	2
Totals (6 entries)		4	4	4	12

=== Boys' events ===
Event	Gold		Silver		Bronze	
Boys' individual	Jonas Schuster; Austria	250.5	Jan Habdas; Poland	247.0	Ben Bayer; Germany	235.0
Boys' team	Austria; Louis Obersteiner; Andre Fussenegger; Raffael Zimmermann; Jonas Schuster	920.0	Poland; Tymoteusz Amilkiewicz; Klemens Joniak; Marcin Wróbel; Jan Habdas	916.0	Germany; Adrian Tittel; Jannik Faißt; Simon Steinbeisser; Ben Bayer	911.5

=== Girls' events ===
Event	Gold		Silver		Bronze	
Girls' individual	Nika Prevc; Slovenia	255.5	Nora Midtsundstad; Norway	228.5	Sina Arnet; Switzerland	221.5

=== Mixed event ===
Event	Gold		Silver		Bronze	
Mixed team	Slovenia; Tinkara Komar; Gorazd Završnik; Nika Prevc; Maksim Bartolj	913.0	Austria; Julia Mühlbacher; Louis Obersteiner; Sophie Kothbauer; Jonas Schuster	897.0	Switzerland; Sina Arnet; Yanick Wasser; Emely Torazza; Lean Niederberger	857.0
