= Snowboarding at the 2022 European Youth Olympic Winter Festival =

- Venue: Vuokatti slopes
- Date: 22–25 March
- Website: eyof2022.fi

Snowboarding at the 2022 European Youth Olympic Winter Festival was held from 22 to 25 March at Vuokatti Sport Biathlon Stadium in Vuokatti, Finland.

== Competition schedule ==
| Date | Time | Event |
|---|---|---|
| 22 March | 10:15 | Girls' Big air qualifications |
| 22 March | 11:45; 13:30 | Boys' Big air qualifications |
| 23 March | 18:05 | Girls' Big air |
| 23 March | 18:05 | Boys' Big air |
| 22 March | 10:15 | Girls' slopestyle qualifications |
| 22 March | 11:45; 13:45 | Boys' slopestyle qualifications |
| 25 March | 11:15 | Girls' slopestyle |
| 25 March | 11:15 | Boys' slopestyle |
Source: All times are (UTC+2)

== Medal summary ==
=== Medal table ===
* Host nation (Finland)

| Rank | Nation | Gold | Silver | Bronze | Total |
|---|---|---|---|---|---|
| 1 | Czech Republic (CZE) | 1 | 1 | 0 | 2 |
| 1 | Finland (FIN)* | 1 | 1 | 0 | 2 |
| 1 | Hungary (HUN) | 1 | 1 | 0 | 2 |
| 4 | Croatia (CRO) | 1 | 0 | 0 | 1 |
| 5 | Switzerland (SUI) | 0 | 1 | 2 | 3 |
| 6 | Germany (GER) | 0 | 0 | 1 | 1 |
| 6 | Netherlands (NED) | 0 | 0 | 1 | 1 |
| Totals (7 entries) | | 4 | 4 | 4 | 12 |

=== Boys' events ===
| Event | Gold | | Silver | | Bronze | |
|---|---|---|---|---|---|---|
| Big air | Dante Brčić; Croatia | 169.50 | Jakub Hroneš; Czech Republic | 168.25 | Nicolas Schütz; Switzerland | 144.75 |
| Slopestyle | Jakub Hroneš; Czech Republic | 89.75 | Alex Lotorto; Switzerland | 85.25 | Jakob Ganserer; Germany | 70.00 |

=== Girls' events ===
| Event | Gold | | Silver | | Bronze | |
|---|---|---|---|---|---|---|
| Big air | Kamilla Kozuback; Hungary | 157.75 | Telma Särkipaju; Finland | 156.50 | Romy van Vreden; Netherlands | 138.00 |
| Slopestyle | Telma Särkipaju; Finland | 88.25 | Kamilla Kozuback; Hungary | 82.50 | Andrina Salis; Switzerland | 73.25 |
