= Alpine skiing at the 2022 European Youth Olympic Winter Festival =

- Venue: Vuokatti slopes
- Date: 22–25 March
- Website: eyof2022.fi

Alpine skiing at the 2022 European Youth Olympic Winter Festival was held from 22 to 25 March at Vuokatti Sport Biathlon Stadium in Vuokatti, Finland.

== Competition schedule ==
Date	Time	Event
22 March	09:00; 11:10	Boys' slalom
22 March	12:00; 14:00	Girls' slalom
23 March	11:00	Girls' parallel slalom qualification
23 March	14:00	Boys' parallel slalom qualification
24 March	13:00	Mixed team parallel slalom
25 March	10:00	Boys' parallel slalom
25 March	14:00	Girls' parallel slalom
Source: All times are (UTC+2)

== Medal summary ==
=== Medal table ===
* Host nation (Finland)

Rank	Nation	Gold	Silver	Bronze	Total
1	Finland (FIN)*	2	1	2	5
2	Austria (AUT)	2	1	1	4
3	Italy (ITA)	1	2	2	5
4	Norway (NOR)	0	1	0	1
Totals (4 entries)		5	5	5	15

=== Boys' events ===
Event	Gold		Silver		Bronze	
Slalom	Erik Saravuo; Finland	1:29.55	Johs Bråthen Herland; Norway	1:29.57	Jesperi Kemppainen; Finland	1:29.66
Parallel slalom	Edoardo Saracco; Italy		Erik Saravuo; Finland		Andrea Bertoldini; Italy	

=== Girls' events ===
Event	Gold		Silver		Bronze	
Slalom	Rosa Pohjolainen; Finland	1:28.74	Emilia Mondinelli; Italy	1:29.93	Victoria Olivier; Austria	1:30.01
Parallel slalom	Victoria Olivier; Austria		Natalie Falch; Austria		Ambra Pomarè; Italy	

=== Mixed event ===
Event	Gold	Silver	Bronze
Mixed team parallel slalom	Austria; Natalie Falch; Fabio Walch; Victoria Olivier; Jakob Greber	Italy; Maria Sole Antonini; Andrea Bertoldini; Beatrice Sola; Edoardo Saracco	Finland; Veera Alaniska; Eduard Hallberg; Riia Pallari; Jesperi Kemppainen
