= Owen Beck (ice hockey) =

Canadian ice hockey player (born 2004)

- Born: February 3, 2004 (age 22) Port Hope, Ontario, Canada
- Height: 6 ft 0 in (183 cm)
- Weight: 199 lb (90 kg; 14 st 3 lb)
- Position: Centre
- Shoots: Right
- NHL team: Montreal Canadiens
- NHL draft: 33rd overall, 2022; Montreal Canadiens
- Playing career: 2023–present

Owen Beck (born February 3, 2004) is a Canadian professional ice hockey player who is a centre for the Montreal Canadiens of the National Hockey League (NHL). He was selected in the second round, 33rd overall, by the Canadiens in the 2022 NHL entry draft.

== Playing career ==
=== Early years ===
As a youth, Beck played with the Northumberland Nighthawks of the Ontario Hockey Federation (OHF) and won the league championship during his peewee year. Thereafter, he joined the Quinte Red Devils AAA ranks for two seasons beginning in 2018, and also briefly played with the Cobourg Cougars of the Ontario Junior Hockey League (OJHL).

=== Junior ===
==== Mississauga Steelheads (2021–2023) ====
Beck initially committed to join the Mississauga Steelheads of the Ontario Hockey League (OHL) for the 2020–21 season but did not play due to the COVID-19 pandemic shutdown. Making his OHL debut the following season, he appeared in 68 games and recorded 21 goals and 30 assists, ranking third on his team in scoring. He, along with teammate Luca Del Bel Belluz, were likewise selected to participate in the annual CHL/NHL Top Prospects Game. At the end of the season, Beck was named to the league's Second All-Rookie Team. He also earned laurels for his academic performance at Philip Pocock Catholic Secondary School, receiving the Bobby Smith Trophy as the OHL's scholastic player of the year and then being named CHL Scholastic Player of the Year. As a result of his performance, the NHL Central Scouting Bureau ranked him tenth among North American skaters in advance of the 2022 NHL entry draft. Considered a potential selection late in the first round, he was ultimately taken by the Montreal Canadiens early into the second round. On October 4, 2022, Beck signed a three-year, entry-level contract with the Canadiens.

==== Peterborough Petes (2023–2024) ====
Returning to major junior to continue development with the Steelheads for the 2022–23 season, Beck recorded 17 goals and 41 points in just 30 games before being traded to hometown club, the Peterborough Petes, on January 7, 2023. After just seven games with the Petes and with the Canadiens suffering an excess of injuries, Beck was unexpectedly recalled from the OHL on an emergency basis on January 27, 2023. He made his NHL debut in a road game versus the Ottawa Senators on January 28, before returning to the OHL ranks.

Beck's point production declined during his first half-season with the Petes, which was attributed to both personal usage in a defense-oriented shutdown role as well as own struggles with the team's new expectations generated by the trade. He would later admit that "when things don't go your way right way with those expectations things can be tough on you mentally." Beck finished the regular season with seven goals and 18 assists in 30 games with the Petes, before attracting praise for his performance during the foregoing's deep run during the OHL playoffs. Registering six goals and seven assists during the first three rounds, Beck was also a key figure in the team's penalty killing, the second-best in the playoffs through that point. Peterborough reached the OHL Championship Series against the London Knights, in what was considered an underdog success against several higher-ranked teams. During Game 2, Beck received a game misconduct after elbowing Knights forward Denver Barkey in the head, but was not suspended from subsequent games as a result of his actions. He took a second major penalty in Game 5 for slew footing defenceman Jackson Edward, and, as a result, was suspended for two games, the theoretical remainder of the series. In his absence, the Petes defeated the Knights in Game 6 to win the J. Ross Robertson Cup, the first championship for Peterborough since 2006. Beck was subsequently named to the OHL Third All-Star Team.

The Petes would qualify for the 2023 Memorial Cup in Kamloops as representative of the OHL, facing off against host Blazers (WHL), the Quebec Remparts (QMJHL), and the Seattle Thunderbirds (WHL). Initially, the second game of Beck's suspension was to apply to the team's round-robin game against the Thunderbirds. However, as the Memorial Cup fell under the jurisdiction of the NHL's Department of Player Safety, they reviewed the OHL's ruling and deemed that he would be able to play in the tournament, instead having to serve the second game if he returned to the OHL the following season. Beck recorded a primary assist on the Petes' overtime-winning goal against the Blazers to reach the tournament semi-final where they were ultimately eliminated by the Thunderbirds.

==== Saginaw Spirit (2024) ====
With Peterborough beginning a rebuild as they entered the 2023–24 season, Beck continued to play for the team until rejoining Team Canada for the 2024 IIHF World Junior Championship. Upon his return to the OHL, he was dealt to the Saginaw Spirit, who were to be the hosts of the 2024 Memorial Cup. Making his Spirit debut on January 10, 2024, he had two goals and four assists in a rout of the Windsor Spitfires, tying the Saginaw team record for most points in a single game. Collectively, Beck had 18 goals and 33 assists in 32 regular season games with the Spirit, before recording 14 points across 17 playoff games. The Spirit reached the playoff semi-finals, but were eliminated by the London Knights. Beck was named to the OHL's Third All-Star Team for a second time. Being one of two Spirit players to have participated in a previous Memorial Cup (alongside Jorian Donovan), he said that "to be in this tournament two years in a row is pretty special." On June 2, Saginaw defeated league rivals London 4–3 to capture the team's first Memorial Cup in history, with Beck registering two goals in the championship game to earn Stafford Smythe Memorial Trophy honours as tournament MVP.

=== Professional ===
==== Montreal Canadiens (2024–present) ====
In October 2024, Beck was assigned to the Laval Rocket, American Hockey League (AHL) affiliate of the Canadiens, to begin the 2024–25 season in his first year of professional hockey. After posting nine goals and 25 points through 37 AHL games with the Rocket, Beck was recalled by Montreal prior to their game versus the New York Rangers on January 19, 2025. Following a scoreless two-game stint with the team, he was reassigned to Laval on January 22. Two days later, Beck was named to the AHL All-Star Classic for the first time in his career. After being recalled by the Canadiens yet again in late February, he would record his first career NHL point thereafter, an assist, on a second period goal scored by linemate Alex Newhook against the San Jose Sharks at the Bell Centre on February 27.

Splitting time between the AHL and NHL ranks to begin the 2025–26 campaign, Beck appeared to have scored his first career NHL goal on December 11 against the Pittsburgh Penguins, only for it to be overturned due to a coach's challenge for offside on teammate Josh Anderson prior to the scoring play. He would instead record his first NHL tally in the Canadiens' next matchup with the Penguins on December 20.

Although initially assigned to Laval by the Canadiens ahead of their 2026–27 season, an injury suffered by rookie forward Florian Xhekaj resulted in Beck being recalled to Montreal on October 12, 2026.

== International play ==
Medal record

Representing Canada

Men's ice hockey

World Junior Championships
Gold medal – first place	2023 Canada	

Beck was invited to participate in the selection camp process for Canada's national junior team for the 2023 IIHF World Junior Championship, but was not selected as part of the initial roster. However, after forward Colton Dach was injured in his country's final group stage game, he was called up to join the team during the knockout stage. Canada ultimately defeated Czechia in the gold medal game, with Beck managing one assist in three appearances, describing the experience as "something that I'll never forget."

In December 2023, Beck was again invited to the junior national selection camp in advance of the 2024 IIHF World Junior Championship. He was the lone returning member of the 2023 team to make the roster, and was subsequently named an alternate captain. However, Canada would be eliminated in their quarterfinals matchup by Czechia and did not secure a podium finish.

== Career statistics ==
=== Regular season and playoffs ===
			Regular season					Playoffs
Season	Team	League	GP	G	A	Pts	PIM	GP	G	A	Pts	PIM
2019–20	Cobourg Cougars	OJHL	2	0	0	0	2	—	—	—	—	—
2021–22	Mississauga Steelheads	OHL	68	21	30	51	14	10	1	5	6	4
2022–23	Mississauga Steelheads	OHL	30	17	24	41	20	—	—	—	—	—
2022–23	Peterborough Petes	OHL	30	7	18	25	15	22	8	8	16	18
2022–23	Montreal Canadiens	NHL	1	0	0	0	0	—	—	—	—	—
2023–24	Peterborough Petes	OHL	25	16	14	30	4	—	—	—	—	—
2023–24	Saginaw Spirit	OHL	32	18	33	51	14	17	4	10	14	8
2024–25	Laval Rocket	AHL	64	15	29	44	49	13	2	4	6	2
2024–25	Montreal Canadiens	NHL	12	0	1	1	0	—	—	—	—	—
2025–26	Laval Rocket	AHL	58	13	20	33	28	5	3	2	5	4
2025–26	Montreal Canadiens	NHL	15	1	0	1	6	—	—	—	—	—
NHL totals			28	1	1	2	6	—	—	—	—	—

=== International ===
Year	Team	Event	Result	GP	G	A	Pts	PIM
2023	Canada	WJC	1st place, gold medalist(s)	3	0	1	1	0
2024	Canada	WJC	5th	5	1	0	1	2
Junior totals				8	1	1	2	2

== Awards and honours ==
Award	Year	Ref
OHL
Bobby Smith Trophy	2022	
OHL Scholastic Team	2022	
Second All-Rookie Team	2022	
J. Ross Robertson Cup champion	2023	
Third All-Star Team	2023, 2024	
CHL
CHL/NHL Top Prospects Game	2022	
CHL Scholastic Player of the Year	2022	
Memorial Cup champion	2024	
Memorial Cup All-Star Team	2024	
Stafford Smythe Memorial Trophy	2024	
AHL
All-Star Game	2025	
