= 2021 FIS Ski Jumping Grand Prix =

Ski Jumping Grand Prix

Discipline	Men	Women
Overall	(Norway) Halvor Egner Granerud	(Slovenia) Urša Bogataj
Nations Cup	Norway	Slovenia

Competition
Edition	28th	10th
Locations	6	5
Individual	8	7
Mixed	1	1
Cancelled	2	–
Rescheduled	1	–

The 2021 FIS Ski Jumping Grand Prix was the 28th Summer Grand Prix season in ski jumping for men and the 10th for women.

Other competitive circuits this season included the World Cup, Continental Cup, FIS Cup, FIS Race and Alpen Cup.

== Map of Grand Prix hosts ==
All 7 locations hosting Grand Prix events for men (6), for women (5) and shared (4) in this season.

2021 FIS Ski Jumping Grand Prix (Europe)	2021 FIS Ski Jumping Grand Prix (Kazakhstan)

Men Women Shared

== Men ==
Grand Prix history in real time

Total	LH	NH	Winners
213	165	48	75

after LH event in Klingenthal (2 October 2021)

=== Calendar ===
NH – normal hill / LH – large hill
Num	Season	Date	Place	Hill	Event	Winner	Second	Third	Yellow bib	Ref.
206	1	17 July 2021	(Poland) Wisła	Malinka HS134	LH _{161}	(Poland) Jakub Wolny	(Austria) Jan Hörl	(Poland) Dawid Kubacki	(Poland) Jakub Wolny	
207	2	18 July 2021	(Poland) Wisła	Malinka HS134	LH _{162}	(Poland) Dawid Kubacki	(Austria) Jan Hörl	(Slovenia) Anže Lanišek	(Poland) Dawid Kubacki	
208	3	7 August 2021	(France) Courchevel	Tremplin du Praz HS135	LH _{163}	(Austria) Stefan Kraft	(Switzerland) Gregor Deschwanden	(Switzerland) Simon Ammann	(Austria) Jan Hörl	
209	4	(Note: Competition from September 4 was rescheduled to September 5 due to wind conditions.)5 September 2021	(Kazakhstan) Shchuchinsk	National Ski Center HS99 (Note: Competition from HS140 was rescheduled to HS99 due to wind conditions.)	NH _{046}	(Norway) Halvor Egner Granerud	(Norway) Marius Lindvik	(Bulgaria) Vladimir Zografski	(Austria) Jan Hörl	
210	5	5 September 2021	(Kazakhstan) Shchuchinsk	National Ski Center HS99	NH _{047}	(Norway) Halvor Egner Granerud	(Norway) Robert Johansson	(Norway) Marius Lindvik (Russia) Danil Sadreev	(Norway) Halvor Egner Granerud	
211	6	11 September 2021	(Russia) Chaykovsky	Snezhinka HS140	LH _{164}	(Norway) Halvor Egner Granerud	(Russia) Evgeniy Klimov	(Norway) Johann Andre Forfang	(Norway) Halvor Egner Granerud	
		18 September 2021	(Romania) Râșnov	Trambulina Valea Cărbunării HS97	NH _{cnx}	Cancelled due to organizational reasons				
		19 September 2021	(Romania) Râșnov	Trambulina Valea Cărbunării HS97	NH _{cnx}	Cancelled due to organizational reasons				
212	7	25 September 2021	(Austria) Hinzenbach	Aigner-Schanze HS90	NH _{048}	(Japan) Yukiya Satō	(Japan) Ryōyū Kobayashi	(Germany) Karl Geiger	(Norway) Halvor Egner Granerud	
213	8	2 October 2021	(Germany) Klingenthal	Vogtland Arena HS140	LH _{165}	(Japan) Ryōyū Kobayashi	(Norway) Halvor Egner Granerud	(Norway) Johann Andre Forfang	(Norway) Halvor Egner Granerud	

=== Standings ===
==== Overall ====
Rank	after all 8 events	Points
1	(Norway) Halvor Egner Granerud	380
2	(Poland) Dawid Kubacki	242
3	(Austria) Jan Hörl	225
4	(Norway) Marius Lindvik	219
5	(Slovenia) Anže Lanišek	208
6	(Poland) Jakub Wolny	203
7	(Austria) Markus Schiffner	191
8	(Japan) Ryōyū Kobayashi	180
9	(Norway) Johann Andre Forfang	169
10	(Russia) Roman Sergeevich Trofimov	168

==== Nations Cup ====
Rank	after all 9 events	Points
1	Norway	1251
2	Austria	773
3	Poland	772
4	Japan	758
5	Slovenia	756
6	Russia	747
7	Germany	574
8	Czech Republic	232
9	Switzerland	225
10	Bulgaria	132

==== Prize money ====
Rank	after all 9 payouts	CHF
1	(Norway) Halvor Egner Granerud	19,250
2	(Japan) Ryōyū Kobayashi (Poland) Dawid Kubacki	8,000
4	(Austria) Jan Hörl (Poland) Jakub Wolny	6,000
6	(Norway) Marius Lindvik	5,500
7	(Norway) Johann Andre Forfang	5,250
8	(Austria) Stefan Kraft (Japan) Yukiya Satō	5,000
10	(Norway) Robert Johansson	4,000

== Women ==
Grand Prix history in real time

Total	LH	NH	Winners
41	10	31	10

after LH event in Klingenthal (2 October 2021)

=== Calendar ===
NH – normal hill / LH – large hill
Num	Season	Date	Place	Hill	Event	Winner	Second	Third	Yellow bib	Ref.
35	1	17 July 2021	(Poland) Wisła	Malinka HS134	LH _{005}	(Slovenia) Urša Bogataj	(Japan) Sara Takanashi	(Japan) Nozomi Maruyama	(Slovenia) Urša Bogataj	
36	2	18 July 2021	(Poland) Wisła	Malinka HS134	LH _{006}	(Slovenia) Urša Bogataj	(Japan) Sara Takanashi	(Austria) Marita Kramer	(Slovenia) Urša Bogataj	
37	3	6 August 2021	(France) Courchevel	Tremplin du Praz HS135	LH _{007}	(Slovenia) Urša Bogataj	(Austria) Marita Kramer	(Slovenia) Nika Križnar	(Slovenia) Urša Bogataj	
38	4	15 August 2021	(Czech Republic) Frenštát pod Radhoštěm	Areal Horečky HS106	NH _{031}	(Japan) Sara Takanashi	(Japan) Nozomi Maruyama	(Norway) Silje Opseth	(Slovenia) Urša Bogataj	
39	5	11 September 2021	(Russia) Chaykovsky	Snezhinka HS140	LH _{008}	(Slovenia) Urša Bogataj	(Norway) Silje Opseth	(Slovenia) Ema Klinec	(Slovenia) Urša Bogataj	
40	6	12 September 2021	(Russia) Chaykovsky	Snezhinka HS140	LH _{009}	(Russia) Irina Avvakumova	(Slovenia) Urša Bogataj	(Norway) Silje Opseth	(Slovenia) Urša Bogataj	
41	7	2 October 2021	(Germany) Klingenthal	Vogtland Arena HS140	LH _{010}	(Austria) Marita Kramer	(Slovenia) Urša Bogataj	(Japan) Sara Takanashi	(Slovenia) Urša Bogataj	

=== Standings ===
==== Overall ====
Rank	after all 7 events	Points
1	(Slovenia) Urša Bogataj	600
2	(Japan) Sara Takanashi	320
3	(Austria) Marita Kramer	272
4	(Norway) Silje Opseth	265
5	(Slovenia) Nika Križnar	236
6	(Japan) Nozomi Maruyama (Slovenia) Ema Klinec	211
8	(Russia) Irina Avvakumova (Slovenia) Jerneja Brecl	210
10	(Austria) Eva Pinkelnig	164

==== Nations Cup ====
Rank	after all 8 events	Points
1	Slovenia	1563
2	Japan	1048
3	Russia	730
4	Austria	717
5	Norway	623
6	Germany	285
7	Czech Republic	211
8	Finland	159
9	France	146
10	Italy	144

==== Prize money ====
Rank	after all 8 payouts	CHF
1	(Slovenia) Urša Bogataj	14,000
2	(Japan) Sara Takanashi	6,500
3	(Austria) Marita Kramer	5,000
4	(Norway) Silje Opseth	4,750
5	(Russia) Irina Avvakumova	3,500
6	(Japan) Nozomi Maruyama	2,750
7	(Slovenia) Ema Klinec	2,500
8	(Slovenia) Nika Križnar	2,250
9	(Norway) Anna Odine Strøm (Austria) Eva Pinkelnig	1,250

== Mixed team ==
Grand Prix history in real time

Total	LH	NH	Winners
7	3	4	4

after LH event in Chaykovsky (12 September 2021)

Num	Season	Date	Place	Hill	Event	Winner	Second	Third	Yellow bib	Ref.
7	1	12 September 2021	(Russia) Chaykovsky	Snezhinka HS140	LH _{003}	Norway Anna Odine Strøm; Johann André Forfang; Silje Opseth; Halvor Egner Granerud	Slovenia Urša Bogataj; Lovro Kos; Ema Klinec; Cene Prevc	Russia Irina Avvakumova; Mikhail Nazarov; Sofia Tikhonova; Evgeniy Klimov	Norway (men); Slovenia (women)	

== Points distribution ==
The table shows the number of points won in the 2021 FIS Ski Jumping Grand Prix for men and women.

Place	1	2	3	4	5	6	7	8	9	10	11	12	13	14	15	16	17	18	19	20	21	22	23	24	25	26	27	28	29	30
Individual	100	80	60	50	45	40	36	32	29	26	24	22	20	18	16	15	14	13	12	11	10	9	8	7	6	5	4	3	2	1
Mixed Team	200	175	150	125	100	75	50	25
