= Jan Habdas =

Polish ski jumper (born 2003)

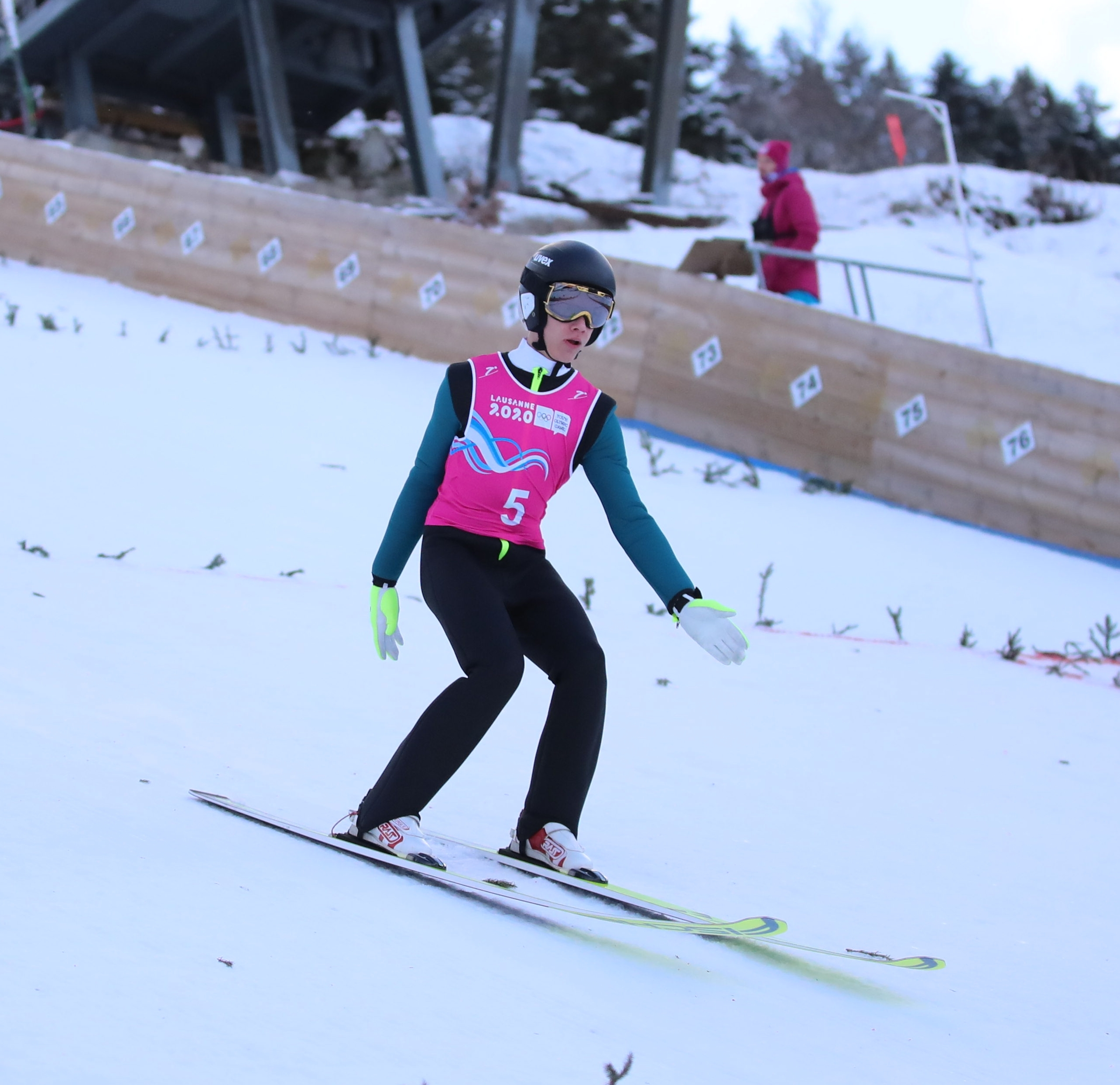

Personal information
- Full name: Jan Habdas
- Nationality: Poland
- Born: 2 December 2003 (age 22) Bielsko-Biała, Poland
- Height: 1.75 m (5 ft 9 in)

Sport
- Sport: Skiing
- Club: LKS Klimczok Bystra

World Cup career
- Seasons: 2018-present
- Indiv. starts: 12
Medal record
Representing Poland
World Junior Championship
Silver medal – second place	2023 Whistler	Team NH
Bronze medal – third place	2023 Whistler	Individual NH
European Youth Olympic Festival
Silver medal – second place	2022 Lahti	Individual NH
Silver medal – second place	2022 Lahti	Team NH
- Updated on 26 February 2023

Jan Habdas (born 2 December 2003) is a Polish ski jumper, a member of Polish ski jumping national team, a 2023 Junior World Vice-Champion in team.

== World Cup ==
=== Season standings ===
Season	Overall	Ski-Flying	Four Hills Tournament	Planica7
2021-22	–	–	–	–
2022-23			46	

=== Individual starts ===
Season	1	2	3	4	5	6	7	8	9	10	11	12	13	14	15	16	17	18	19	20	21	22	23	24	25	26	27	28	29	30	31	32	Points
2021/22																																	0
2021/22	–	–	–	–	46	–	–	–	–	–	–	–	–	–	–	–	–	–	–	–	–	–	–	–	–	–	–	–					0
2022/23																																	48
2022/23	34	34	–	–	–	–	–	–	49	43	30	21	–	–	–	–	–	–	–	–	q	32	17	–	–	–	–	–	–	11	q	–	48
