= Annic Büchi =

Swiss ice hockey player (born 2005)

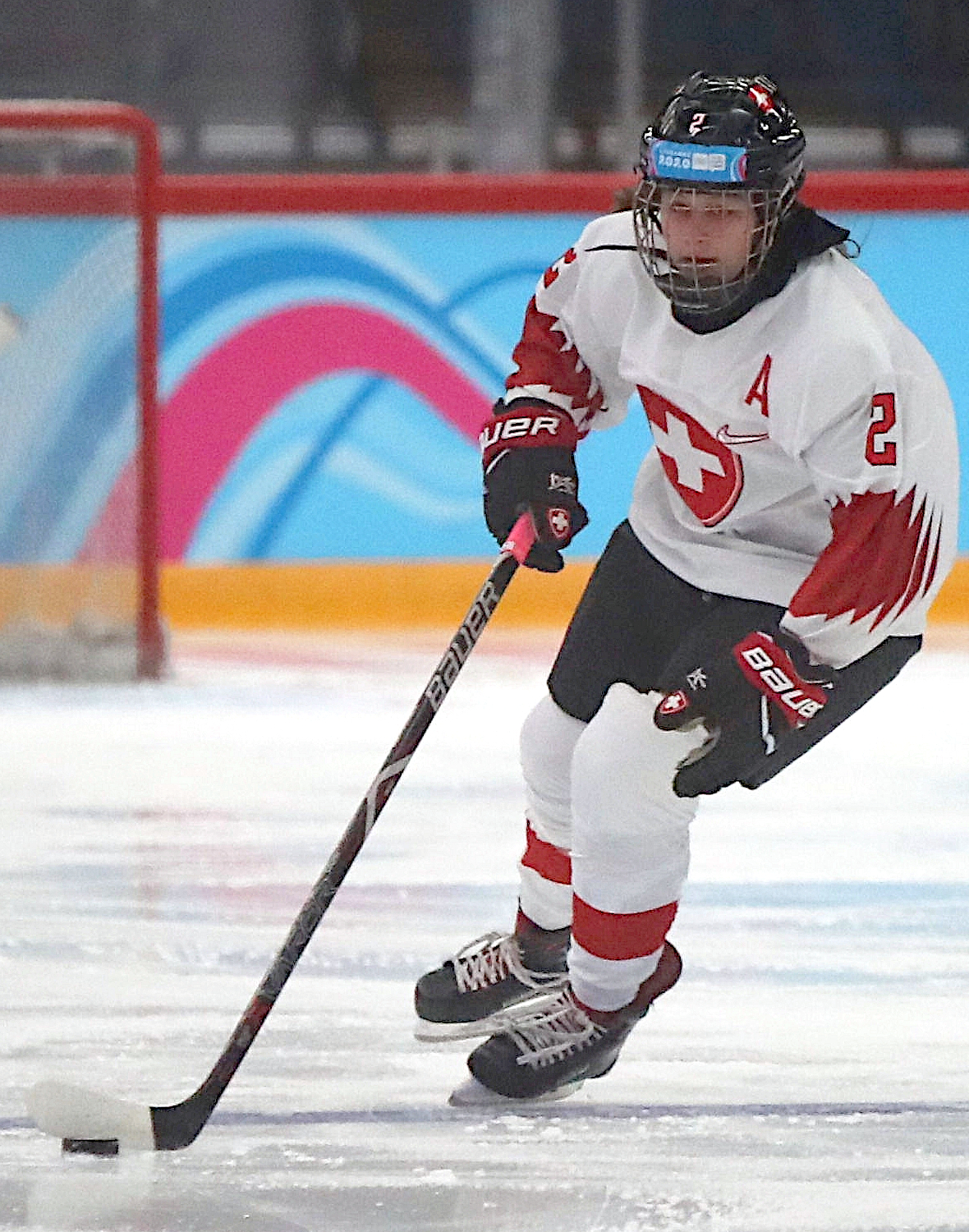
- Büchi in 2020
- Born: 2 April 2005 (age 21) Brütten, Switzerland
- Height: 1.69 m (5 ft 7 in)
- Weight: 67 kg (148 lb; 10 st 8 lb)
- Position: Defense
- Shoots: Left
- SWHL team Former teams: EVZ; SC Weinfelden; HC Thurgau
- National team: Switzerland
- Playing career: 2019–present
Medal record
Olympic Games
Bronze medal – third place	2026 Milano Cortina	Team

Annic Danielle Büchi (born 2 April 2005) is a Swiss ice hockey player.

== International play ==
Büchi is a member of the Switzerland women's national ice hockey team that participated in women's ice hockey tournament at the 2026 Winter Olympics.

Buchi made her Olympic debut on 6 February 2026. In a 4–3 shootout win versus Czechia, Büchi, wearing number 2, logged 8:41 of ice time.
