= Yegor Zavragin =

Russian ice hockey player (born 2005)

- Born: August 23, 2005 (age 21) Novosibirsk, Russia
- Height: 6 ft 2 in (188 cm)
- Weight: 183 lb (83 kg; 13 st 1 lb)
- Position: Goaltender
- Catches: Left
- KHL team Former teams: Metallurg Magnitogorsk; HK Sochi; SKA Saint Petersburg
- NHL draft: 87th overall, 2023; Philadelphia Flyers

Yegor Zavragin (born 23 August 2005) is a Russian professional ice hockey goaltender for Metallurg Magnitogorsk of the Kontinental Hockey League (KHL). He was drafted 87th overall by the Philadelphia Flyers in the 2023 NHL entry draft.

== Playing career ==
Zavragin played for the youth club Shturm Chik, before joining Yugra Khanty-Mansiysk's amateur side in 2019. He made his professional debut for the club's MHL affiliate, Mamonty Yugry, during the 2021-22 season, making 31 appearances with a 2.13 goals against average, a .930 save percentage, and a 20-4-2 record during the regular season. He also made one postseason appearance, stopping seven of ten shots faced in one game. Returning to the team the following year, Zavragin's numbers dipped a bit, as he appeared in 21 games and worked to a GAA 2.49 with a SV% of .920. He also debuted for Yugra at the VHL level that year, during which he would not allow a goal in a single appearance. Zavragin was productive for Yugry during their playoff run, finishing with a 2.68 GAA and a .927 SV% in 4 contests.

Prior to the start of the 2023-24 season, Zavragin was selected by the Philadelphia Flyers at 87th overall in the 2023 NHL entry draft. 2023-24 was a breakout season for Zavragin, who started the campaign by fairly easily dispatching opposing offenses for Yugry. He finished the season with a GAA 1.63 and a .945 SV% in 9 games for them, then would later return to record a shutout for them during the MHL playoffs later on in the year. Zavragin would end up spending most of the year with Yugra though. There, he posted a similarly impressive 1.60 GAA and with a .943 SV% - the later the league's best mark for the season. Zavragin was also named VHL Best Rookie for his efforts. In the playoffs, he appeared in 8 games, finishing with a 2.11 GAA and a .933 SV%.

On May 2 2024, Zavragin was traded by Yugra to Kontinental Hockey League club SKA St. Petersburg for Yegor Gurzanov and Matvei Kabush, and immediately signed to a three-year contract. In July, he was loaned to HK Sochi to start the season. On October 9, after posting a .941 ave percentage in six games with Sochi, Zavragin was recalled from his loan by SKA.

After his second season within SKA Saint Petersburg organization, Zavragin was traded alongside Yegor Zelenov to Metallurg Magnitogorsk in exchange for captain Alexei Maklyukov on 6 June 2026.

== Career statistics ==
			Regular season									Playoffs
Season	Team	League	GP	W	L	OT	MIN	GA	SO	GAA	SV%	GP	W	L	MIN	GA	SO	GAA	SV%
2021–22	Mamonty Yugry	MHL	31	20	4	2	1,551	55	2	2.13	.930	1	0	1	20	3	0	9.00	.700
2022–23	Yugra Khanty-Mansiysk	VHL	1	0	0	0	7	0	0	0.00	1.000	—	—	—	—	—	—	—	—
2022–23	Mamonty Yugry	MHL	21	11	6	1	1,132	47	1	2.49	.920	4	2	2	246	11	0	2.68	.927
2023–24	Yugra Khanty-Mansiysk	VHL	17	13	1	0	935	25	3	1.60	.943	8	4	4	454	16	0	2.11	.933
2023–24	Mamonty Yugry	MHL	9	6	1	2	552	15	2	1.63	.945	1	1	0	60	0	1	0.00	1.000
2024–25	HK Sochi	KHL	6	3	3	0	326	12	1	2.21	.941	—	—	—	—	—	—	—	—
2024–25	SKA Saint Petersburg	KHL	37	17	11	3	2,000	85	3	2.55	.912	4	1	2	205	11	0	3.22	.913
2024–25	SKA-1946	MHL	—	—	—	—	—	—	—	—	12	9	3	0	685	23	2	2.01	.921
2025–26	SKA Saint Petersburg	KHL	12	5	7	0	684	30	1	2.63	.919	—	—	—	—	—	—	—	—
2025–26	SKA-VMF	VHL	18	10	6	2	1085	26	5	1.44	.949	—	—	—	—	—	—	—	—
2025–26	SKA-1946	MHL	1	0	0	1	65	3	0	2.77	.914	4	1	2	183	11	0	3.61	.872
KHL totals			55	25	21	3	3,010	127	5	2.53	.918	4	1	2	205	11	0	3.22	.913

== Awards and honors ==
Award	Year
VHL
Best Rookie	2024
