= Aleksanteri Kaskimäki =

Finnish ice hockey player (born 2004)

Aleksanteri Kaskimaki
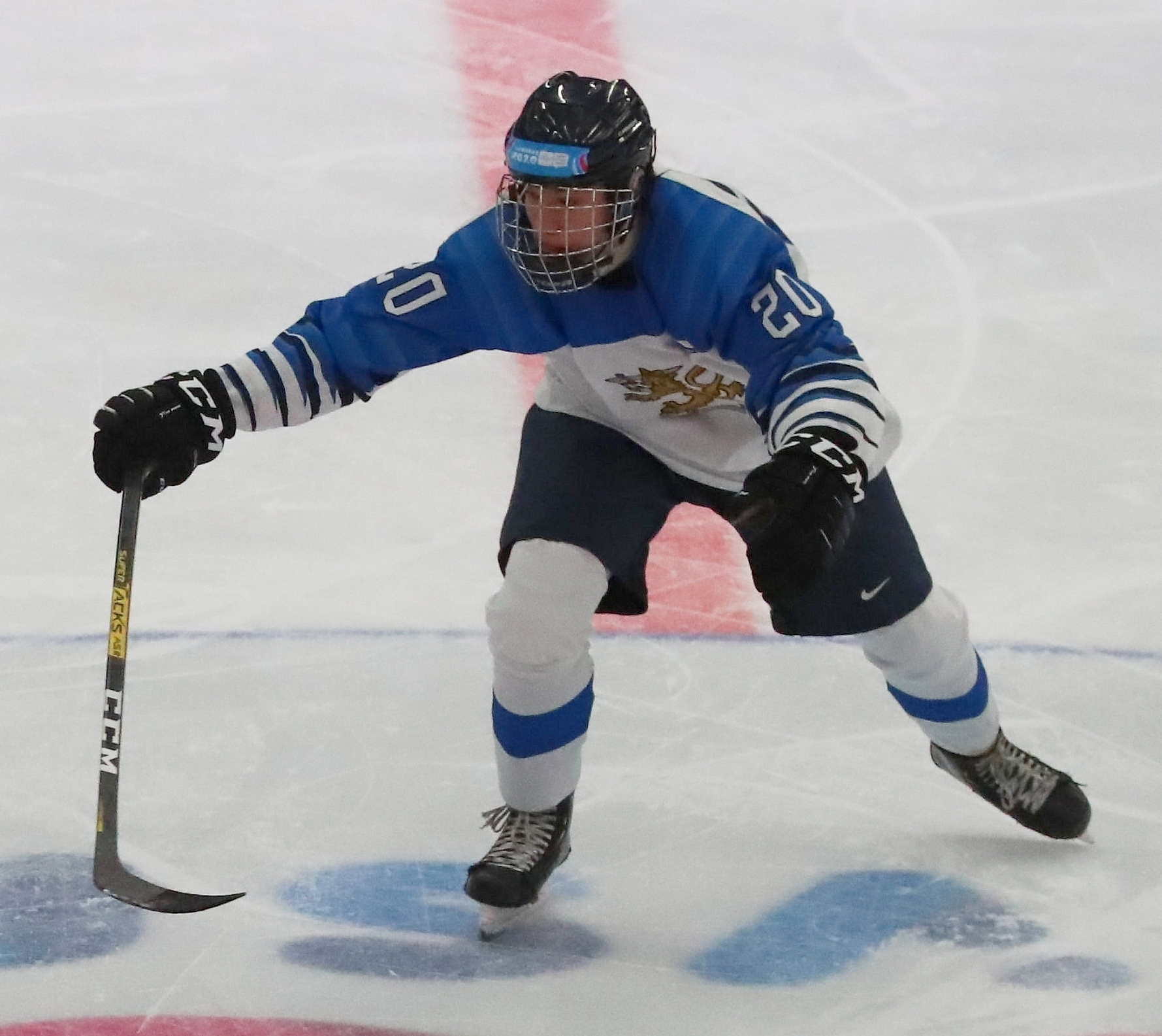
- Kaskimaki in 2020
- Born: 6 February 2004 (age 22) Espoo, Uusimaa, Finland
- Height: 6 ft 0 in (183 cm)
- Weight: 195 lb (88 kg; 13 st 13 lb)
- Position: Centre
- Shoots: Left
- NHL team Former teams: St. Louis Blues; HIFK
- NHL draft: 73rd overall, 2022; St. Louis Blues
- Playing career: 2021–present

Aleksanteri Pekka Olavi Kaskimäki (born 6 February 2004) is a Finnish professional ice hockey centre for the St. Louis Blues of the National Hockey League (NHL). Kaskimaki was selected with the 73rd pick in the 2022 NHL Draft.

== Career statistics ==
=== Regular season and playoffs ===
			Regular season					Playoffs
Season	Team	League	GP	G	A	Pts	PIM	GP	G	A	Pts	PIM
2020–21	HIFK	Jr. A	13	1	1	2	0	—	—	—	—	—
2021–22	HIFK	Jr. A	31	19	21	40	20	—	—	—	—	—
2021–22	HIFK	Liiga	4	1	1	2	0	—	—	—	—	—
2022–23	HIFK	Jr. A	4	1	4	5	0	—	—	—	—	—
2022–23	HIFK	Liiga	41	3	4	7	4	7	3	1	4	0
2023–24	HIFK	Liiga	48	10	7	17	14	6	0	1	1	0
2024–25	Springfield Thunderbirds	AHL	63	11	23	34	8	3	0	0	0	4
2025–26	Springfield Thunderbirds	AHL	64	20	24	44	10	11	0	7	7	2
2025–26	St. Louis Blues	NHL	5	0	0	0	0	—	—	—	—	—
Liiga totals			93	14	12	26	18	13	3	2	5	0
NHL totals			5	0	0	0	0	—	—	—	—	—

=== International ===
Year	Team	Event	Result	GP	G	A	Pts	PIM
2021	Finland	IH18	4th	5	3	0	3	2
2022	Finland	U18	3rd place, bronze medalist(s)	6	1	3	4	0
2023	Finland	WJC	5th	5	0	0	0	0
2024	Finland	WJC	4th	7	2	2	4	4
Junior totals				23	6	5	11	6
