= 2022 European Youth Olympic Winter Festival =

2022 edition of the European Youth Olympic Winter Festival

2022 European Youth Winter Olympic Festival
- Host city: Vuokatti, Finland
- Country: Finland
- Nations: 46
- Sport: 9
- Events: 39
- Opening: March 20, 2022
- Closing: March 25, 2022
- Opened by: Sauli Niinistö
- Athlete's Oath: Arttu Juusola
- Torch lighter: Vilma Nissinen
- Main venue: Vuokatti Arena
- Website: eyof2022.fi

Summer

Winter

The 2022 European Youth Olympic Winter Festival was held in Vuokatti, Finland, between 20 and 25 March 2022. The festival was postponed from original dates in February to December 2021. Later it was announced that the games will be moved to 2022 as a result of the COVID-19 pandemic. Vuokatti previously hosted 2001 European Youth Olympic Winter Festival.

== Opening ceremony ==
The Opening Ceremony was held outside Vuokatti Areena. The Flame of Peace was carried to the stage by former biathlete Kaisa Mäkäräinen and former cross-country skier Matti Heikkinen. It was finally lit by young cross country skier Vilma Nissinen.

President of the Republic of Finland Sauli Niinistö gave the opening speech and declared the event opened. Also President of the European Olympic Committees Spyros Capralos and Mayor of Sotkamo Mika Kilpeläinen delivered speeches. The participating countries entered the ceremony in the flag parade. The dance group Kajaani Dance held a performance with the official song of the festival, "Long in to the Night".

== Sports ==
The following competitions took place

2022 European Youth Olympic Winter Festival Sports Programme
- Alpine skiing (5)
- Biathlon (5)
- Cross-country skiing (7)
- Figure skating (2)
- Ice hockey (2)
- Nordic combined (3)
- Short track speed skating (7)
- Ski jumping (4)
- Snowboarding (4)

== Venues ==
Venue	Location	Sports
Vuokatti slopes	Vuokatti	Alpine skiing, Snowboarding
Vuokatti Sport Biathlon Stadium	Vuokatti	Biathlon, Cross country skiing
Vuokatti Arena	Vuokatti	Figure skating, Short track speed skating
Kajaanin jäähalli	Kajaani	Ice hockey
Lahti Sports Center	Lahti	Nordic combined, Ski jumping

== Schedule ==
The competition schedule for the 2022 European Youth Olympic Winter Festival is as follows:

OC	Opening ceremony	1	Event finals	CC	Closing ceremony	●	Event competitions

March	20 Sun	21 Mon	22 Tue	23 Wed	24 Thu	25 Fri	Events
Ceremonies	OC					CC	
Alpine skiing			2	●	1	2	5
Biathlon			2		2	1	5
Cross-country skiing		2	2		2	1	7
Figure skating				●	2		2
Ice hockey		●	●	●	●	1	2^{[I]}
Nordic combined			1	1		1	3
Short track speed skating		2	2			3	7
Ski jumping				1	2	1	4
Snowboarding			●	2	●	2	4
Total events		4	9	4	9	12	39
Cumulative total		5	14	18	27	39	39
March	20 Sun	21 Mon	22 Tue	23 Wed	24 Thu	25 Fri	Events

Note Boys ice hockey was played between 12 and 17 December 2021.

== Participant nations ==
On 28 February 2022, the IOC further called for Russian and Belarusian athletes not to be allowed to participate due to Russian invasion of Ukraine. On 2 March 2022, however, in accordance with a recommendation by the International Olympic Committee (IOC), EOC suspended the participation of Belarus and Russia from 2022 European Youth Olympic Winter Festival. However, this action was not yet in effect as of December 2021, when the ice hockey tournament was played.Consequently, both countries won medals in that tournament.

Participating National Olympic Committees (48)
- Albania
- Andorra
- Armenia
- Austria
- Belarus *
- Belgium
- Bosnia and Herzegovina
- Bulgaria
- Croatia
- Cyprus
- Czech Republic
- Denmark
- Estonia (19)
- Finland
- France
- (Georgia (country)) Georgia
- Germany
- (United Kingdom) Great Britain
- Greece
- Hungary
- Iceland
- (Republic of Ireland) Ireland
- Israel
- Italy
- Kosovo
- Latvia
- Liechtenstein
- Lithuania (15)
- Luxembourg
- Moldova
- Montenegro
- Netherlands
- North Macedonia
- Norway
- Poland
- Portugal
- Romania
- Russia *
- Serbia
- Slovakia
- Slovenia
- Spain
- Sweden
- Switzerland
- Turkey
- Ukraine

* Only in boys' ice hockey tournament

== Medal table ==
* Host nation (Finland)

Rank	Nation	Gold	Silver	Bronze	Total
1	Finland*	6	4	4	14
2	Italy	5	8	7	20
3	Austria	5	3	2	10
4	Sweden	4	5	4	13
5	France	4	1	6	11
6	Netherlands	4	0	2	6
7	Czech Republic	3	4	0	7
8	Slovenia	3	1	1	5
9	Hungary	1	4	0	5
10	Norway	1	2	0	3
11	Croatia	1	0	0	1
11	Estonia	1	0	0	1
11	Latvia	1	0	0	1
14	Poland	0	3	2	5
15	Switzerland	0	2	5	7
16	Germany	0	1	3	4
17	Belarus	0	1	0	1
18	Slovakia	0	0	2	2
19	Russia	0	0	1	1
Totals (19 entries)		39	39	39	117
