= Topi Rönni =

Finnish ice hockey player (born 2004)

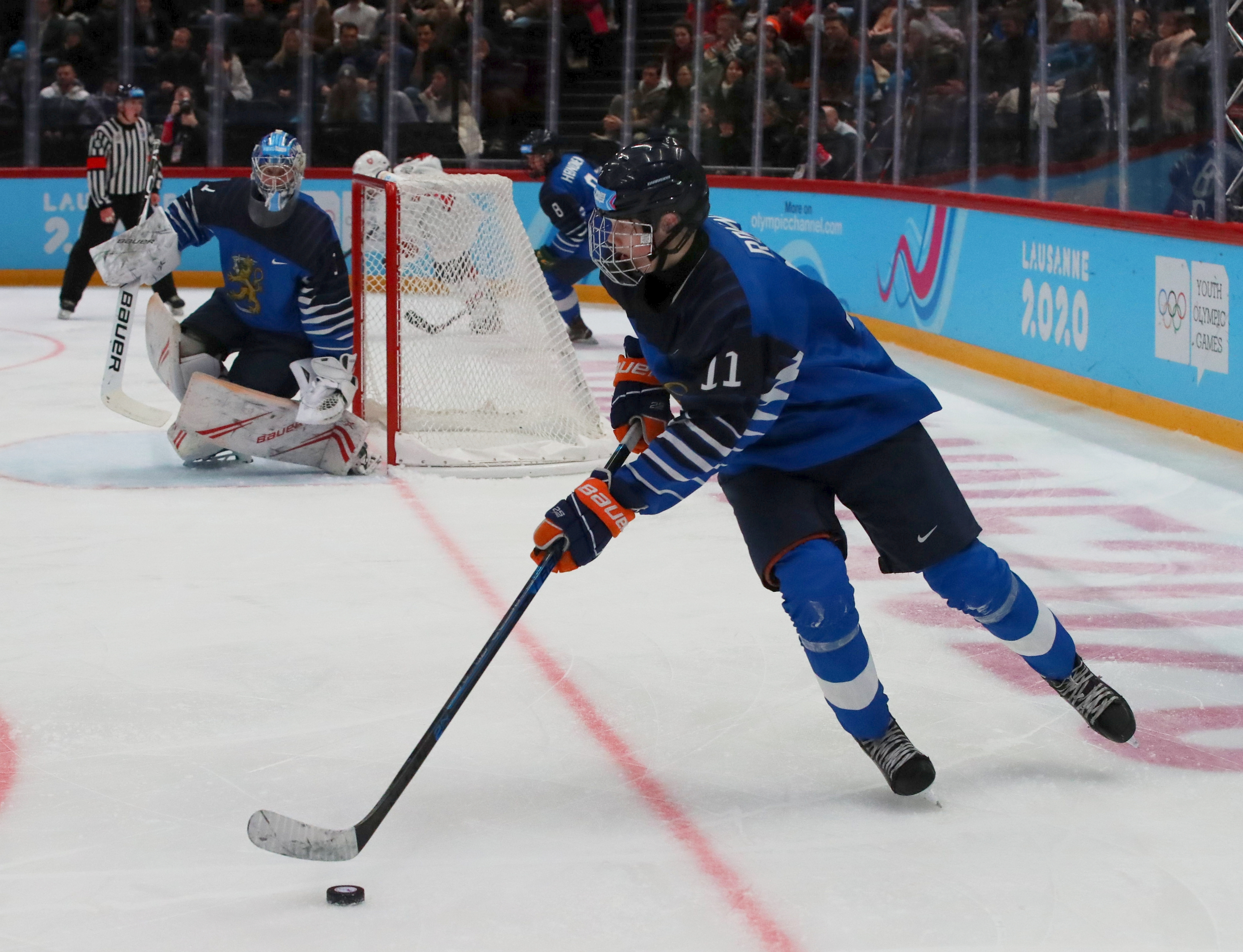
- Rönni at the 2020 Winter Youth Olympics
- Born: May 5, 2004 (age 22) Hausjärvi, Finland
- Height: 188 cm (6 ft 2 in)
- Weight: 81 kg (179 lb; 12 st 11 lb)
- Position: Centre
- Shoots: Left
- ICEHL team Former teams: Ferencvárosi TC; Tappara; HPK; HK Dukla Michalovce
- NHL draft: 59th overall, 2022; Calgary Flames
- Playing career: 2021–present

Topi Rönni (born May 5, 2004) is a Finnish professional ice hockey player who is a forward for Ferencvárosi TC of the ICE Hockey League (ICEHL). He previously played for HPK and Tappara of the Liiga and for HK Dukla Michalovce of the Slovak Extraliga. He was selected in the second round, 59th overall in the 2022 NHL entry draft by the Calgary Flames.

In 2024, following a conviction for rape committed as a minor, the Flames renounced their signing rights to Rönni, and his contract with Tappara was terminated.

== Playing career ==
The Calgary Flames drafted Rönni in the second round, 59th overall in the 2022 NHL entry draft. He missed most of the 2022–23 season due to a knee injury and illness. He appeared in 22 regular season matches for Tappara in the SM-liiga, totaling five points. Tappara won the Finnish championship, but Rönni didn't play a match in the playoffs. In the Champions Hockey League (CHL), Rönni played five matches and scored one assist, and Tappara won the CHL championship. Rönni signed a two-year contract extension with the club in May 2023.

In October 2023, Rönni took a leave of absence from the team following criminal charges related to a rape allegation. Following his conviction in March 2024, his signing rights were renounced by the Flames and his SM-liiga contract was terminated by Tappara.

In June 2024, HK Dukla Michalovce of the Slovak Extraliga announced that they had signed Rönni to a one-year contract.

On 12 April 2025, Finnish club Vaasan Sport announced that it had signed Rönni to a two-year contract. However, following intense public and media criticism, the club announced on 2 May that the contract had been terminated.

On 8 July 2025, Rönni signed a one-year contract to play with Ferencvárosi TC, a team based in Budapest, Hungary that had previously played in the Erste Liga but had been newly promoted to the multi-state ICE Hockey League.

== Personal life ==
In his youth, Rönni was also involved in athletics with Tampereen Pyrintö, where he won silver in the Finnish discus throw championship competition as a 14-year old.

Rönni was charged with rape in the Helsinki District Court in October 2023 for an incident that occurred in 2021, when he was a minor. In March 2024, he received a one-year suspended sentence for rape committed as a young person.

== Career statistics ==
=== Regular season and playoffs ===
			Regular season					Playoffs
Season	Team	League	GP	G	A	Pts	PIM	GP	G	A	Pts	PIM
2020–21	Tappara	U20 SM-sarja	39	9	17	26	24	2	0	0	0	2
2021–22	Tappara	U20 SM-sarja	30	11	18	29	53	2	0	2	2	0
2021–22	Tappara	Liiga	19	2	2	4	2	2	0	0	0	0
2021–22	HPK	Liiga	1	0	0	0	0	—	—	—	—	—
2021–22	KeuPa HT	Mestis	1	1	1	2	2	—	—	—	—	—
2022–23	Tappara	U20 SM-sarja	7	2	8	10	4	12	5	10	15	6
2022–23	Tappara	Liiga	22	2	3	5	2	—	—	—	—	—
2023–24	Tappara	U20 SM-sarja	20	10	22	32	42	—	—	—	—	—
2023–24	Tappara	Liiga	22	1	1	2	6	—	—	—	—	—
2024–25	HK Dukla Michalovce	Slovak	44	10	16	26	26	4	0	3	3	4
Liiga totals			64	5	6	11	10	14	5	10	15	6

=== International ===
Year	Team	Event	Result	GP	G	A	Pts	PIM
2021	Finland	HG18	4th	5	2	4	6	8
2022	Finland	U18	3rd place, bronze medalist(s)	6	2	2	4	0
2023	Finland	WJC	5th	5	0	0	0	4
Junior totals				16	4	6	10	12
