= William Strömgren =

Swedish ice hockey player (born 2003)

- Born: June 7, 2003 (age 23) Örnsköldsvik, Sweden
- Height: 6 ft 3 in (191 cm)
- Weight: 181 lb (82 kg; 12 st 13 lb)
- Position: Left-wing
- Shoots: Left
- NHL team Former teams: Calgary Flames; Rögle BK; Brynäs IF
- NHL draft: 45th overall, 2021; Calgary Flames
- Playing career: 2021–present

William Strömgren (born June 7, 2003) is a Swedish ice hockey left-winger, currently playing for the Calgary Flames of the National Hockey League (NHL).

== Playing career ==
=== Sweden ===
Strömgren began his professional career during the 2020-21 season with Modo Hockey, of the second tier Swedish league: the HockeyAllsvenskan. He would split the season with MoDo's junior league teams, as well as spending time on loan to third tier team Örnsköldsvik HF of the HockeyEttan. After being drafted by the Calgary Flames in the second round, 45th overall during the 2021 NHL draft, Strömgren would make his SHL debut for Rögle BK during the 2021-22 season. Strömgren struggled to maintain a consistent roster spot with Rögle, spending most of the season with their junior club. Early into the 2022-23 season, Strömgren moved from the dominant Rögle team who had won the league championship the previous season, to struggling Brynäs IF following his mutual contract termination. This move allowed Strömgren to have a much more significant role in the club, suiting up for 45 games with the team.

=== North America ===
On March 29, 2023, the Calgary Flames signed Strömgren to a 3-year entry-level contract, beginning with the 2023–24 season. Following his NHL contract signing, Strömgren signed an amateur-tryout (ATO) contract with the Flames top affiliate: the Calgary Wranglers of the American Hockey League. Joining very late in the season, he would only play in two games for the Wranglers before the seasons end.

Prior to the 2023–24 NHL season, Strömgren would participate in the Young Stars Classic tournament during the Flames preseason, scoring twice in the team's matchup against the Winnipeg Jets. An early cut from the Flames training camp, Strömgren was assigned to the Wranglers for the 2023–24 AHL season on September 29, 2023. Strömgren would score his first AHL goal on December 23, 2023, during a 5–1 victory over the Colorado Eagles, his 24th game of the season.

He scored his first NHL goal on November 2, 2026, against the San Jose Sharks.

== International play ==
Medal record

Representing Sweden

Ice hockey

World U18 Championships
Bronze medal – third place	2021 United States	

Strömgren represented Sweden at the 2021 IIHF World U18 Championships, recording two goals and three assists en route to capturing a bronze medal at the tournament.

In 2023, Strömgren would again represent Sweden, this time during the 2023 World Junior Ice Hockey Championships. He would struggle to score at the tournament, recording only a single assist in seven games, with Sweden losing to the United States in the bronze medal game.

== Career statistics ==
=== Regular season and playoffs ===
			Regular season					Playoffs
Season	Team	League	GP	G	A	Pts	PIM	GP	G	A	Pts	PIM
2019–20	Modo Hockey	J20	10	3	4	7	2	—	—	—	—	—
2020–21	Modo Hockey	J20	14	10	8	18	8	—	—	—	—	—
2020–21	Modo Hockey	Allsv	27	3	6	9	2	—	—	—	—	—
2021–22	Rögle BK	J20	44	13	23	36	18	6	1	3	4	6
2021–22	Rögle BK	SHL	6	0	0	0	0	2	0	0	0	0
2022–23	Rögle BK	J20	1	3	0	3	0	—	—	—	—	—
2022–23	Brynäs IF	J20	1	1	2	3	0	—	—	—	—	—
2022–23	Brynäs IF	SHL	45	3	5	8	8	—	—	—	—	—
2022–23	Calgary Wranglers	AHL	2	0	0	0	0	—	—	—	—	—
2023–24	Calgary Wranglers	AHL	68	7	20	27	16	6	1	3	4	2
2024–25	Calgary Wranglers	AHL	70	14	35	49	16	2	0	0	0	2
2025–26	Calgary Wranglers	AHL	66	11	36	47	52	—	—	—	—	—
2025–26	Calgary Flames	NHL	3	0	0	0	0	—	—	—	—	—
SHL totals			51	3	5	8	8	2	0	0	0	0
NHL totals			3	0	0	0	0	—	—	—	—	—

=== International ===
Year	Team	Event	Result	GP	G	A	Pts	PIM
2021	Sweden	U18	3rd place, bronze medalist(s)	7	2	3	5	2
2023	Sweden	WJC	4th	7	0	1	1	2
Junior totals				14	2	4	6	4
