= Topias Vilén =

Finnish ice hockey player (born 2003)

- Born: 1 April 2003 (age 23) Lahti, Finland
- Height: 6 ft 1 in (185 cm)
- Weight: 194 lb (88 kg; 13 st 12 lb)
- Position: Defence
- Shoots: Left
- NHL team (P) Cur. team Former teams: New Jersey Devils; Utica Comets (AHL); Lahti Pelicans
- NHL draft: 129th overall, 2021; New Jersey Devils
- Playing career: 2020–present

Topias Vilén (born 1 April 2003) is a Finnish professional ice hockey player who is a defenceman for the Utica Comets of the American Hockey League (AHL) as a prospect to the New Jersey Devils of the National Hockey League (NHL). He was selected 129th overall in the fifth round of the 2021 NHL entry draft by the Devils.

== Playing career ==
=== Finland ===
Vilén first played hockey around the age of four in his hometown of Lahti, and played his youth and junior career with the Lahti Pelicans. He plays defense because his older brother Elias made him do so in floor hockey matches. Vilén made his professional debut with the Pelicans' SM-liiga club on 18 February 2020, at 16 years old. He recorded 15 minutes of ice time in the 3–0 loss to JYP Jyväskylä, a match he found out he'd be playing just one day prior. In April 2020, he signed a two-year contract extension with the Pelicans.

In the 2020–21 season, 17-year-old Vilén played 35 games in the SM-Liiga and six in the second-tier Mestis. His first goal in the league came on 30 October 2020. Following the conclusion of the season, he was drafted in the fifth round (129th overall) of the 2021 NHL entry draft by the New Jersey Devils. On 23 July 2021, he extended his contract with the Pelicans through 2023.

Remaining in Finland for the 2021–22 season, his second full season of top-level men's pro hockey, Vilén played 50 games and averaged nearly 15 minutes of ice time, recording just six points and no goals.

On 12 May 2022, Vilén was signed to a three-year, entry-level contract with New Jersey, but was loaned back to the Pelicans for the 2022–23 season. Following the signing, Vilén stated that he was surprised and excited to be offered a contract so soon.

=== North America ===
Following a run to the 2023 Liiga finals with Lahti, Vilén joined the Devils' American Hockey League (AHL) affiliate, the Utica Comets, making his AHL debut on 3 May 2023, in a playoff game against the Toronto Marlies.

Following Devils training camp, Vilén was assigned to Utica for the 2023–24 season. He recorded his first AHL point with two assists against the Syracuse Crunch on 27 October 2023. On 24 November 2023, after missing three weeks with an injury, Vilén was assigned to the Adirondack Thunder, the ECHL affiliate of the Devils and Comets. In his first weekend of ECHL play, he had an assist in each of two games against the Worcester Railers. Shuffled up and down between the AHL and ECHL over the next few months, Vilén scored his first ECHL goal on 3 January 2024, and his first AHL goal on 15 January, in a 5–4 overtime loss to the Syracuse Crunch. Comets head coach Kevin Dineen praised Vilén's passing and skating in his first full year of North American play, and cited puck retrievals and applying pressure to puck carriers as areas where he initially struggled in adapting to the AHL. By the end of the year, according to Dineen, Vilén had become a "minutes-cruncher;" an integral part of the Comets' defense group.

In the second period of a 30 September 2024 preseason game between the Devils and the New York Rangers, Vilén suffered an upper-body injury. He was activated from injured reserve and assigned to Utica on 29 October. He would spend the entire season with the Comets, recording one goal and 24 points in 58 games.

After spending much of the 2025–26 season with the Comets, Vilén made his NHL debut for the Devils on 12 April 2026, recording just over 12 minutes in a 4–3 victory over the Ottawa Senators.

On 29 July 2026, Vilén was re-signed to a one-year, two-way contract by the Devils.

== International play ==
Vilén represented Finland at various junior-level events beginning at the under-16 level, and was an alternate captain for the Finns multiple times, including at the 2021 World U18 Championship and the 2023 World Junior Championship.

== Personal life ==
Vilén is the younger brother of Elias Vilén. They played together in the Lahti Pelicans system, most notably in the top-level SM-liiga.

== Career statistics ==
=== Regular season and playoffs ===
			Regular season					Playoffs
Season	Team	League	GP	G	A	Pts	PIM	GP	G	A	Pts	PIM
2019–20	Lahti Pelicans	U20 SM-sarja	40	4	7	11	16	1	0	1	1	0
2019–20	Lahti Pelicans	Liiga	1	0	0	0	0	—	—	—	—	—
2019–20	Peliitat	Mestis	3	0	1	1	0	—	—	—	—	—
2020–21	Lahti Pelicans	Liiga	35	3	5	8	6	—	—	—	—	—
2020–21	Peliitat	Mestis	6	1	0	1	0	—	—	—	—	—
2021–22	Lahti Pelicans	Liiga	50	0	6	6	12	3	0	0	0	2
2021–22	Lahti Pelicans	U20 SM-sarja	1	0	2	2	0	1	0	0	0	0
2022–23	Lahti Pelicans	Liiga	41	9	8	17	6	18	4	5	9	31
2022–23	Utica Comets	AHL	—	—	—	—	—	1	0	0	0	0
2023–24	Utica Comets	AHL	54	2	27	29	16	—	—	—	—	—
2023–24	Adirondack Thunder	ECHL	6	3	7	10	2	—	—	—	—	—
2024–25	Utica Comets	AHL	58	1	23	24	20	—	—	—	—	—
2025–26	Utica Comets	AHL	61	4	23	27	24	—	—	—	—	—
2025–26	New Jersey Devils	NHL	2	0	0	0	0	—	—	—	—	—
NHL totals			2	0	0	0	0	—	—	—	—	—

=== International ===
Year	Team	Event	Result	GP	G	A	Pts	PIM
2019	Finland	U17	7th	4	1	0	1	0
2021	Finland	U18	4th	7	0	4	4	4
2023	Finland	WJC	5th	5	0	1	1	0
Junior totals				16	1	5	6	4
