= Ty Murchison =

American ice hockey player (born 2003)

- Born: February 2, 2003 (age 23) Corona, California, U.S.
- Height: 6 ft 2 in (188 cm)
- Weight: 212 lb (96 kg; 15 st 2 lb)
- Position: Defense
- Shoots: Left
- NHL team (P) Cur. team: Philadelphia Flyers; Lehigh Valley Phantoms (AHL)
- NHL draft: 158th overall, 2021; Philadelphia Flyers
- Playing career: 2025–present

Ty Murchison (born February 2, 2003) is an American professional ice hockey defenseman for the Lehigh Valley Phantoms of the American Hockey League (AHL) while under contract to the Philadelphia Flyers of the National Hockey League (NHL). The Flyers selected him in the fifth round, 158th overall, of the 2021 NHL entry draft.

== Early life ==
Murchison was born February 2, 2003, in Corona, California, to Ken and Allyson Murchison. He came from athletic, Canadian parents: Ken was a professional ice hockey player in the East Coast Hockey League, while his mother was a figure skater. Originally a roller hockey player, Murchison did not transition to ice hockey until the age of 11. When he was 16, Murchison moved to Michigan to play for the USA Hockey National Team Development Program.

== Playing career ==
=== NCAA ===
Despite offers from other college ice hockey programs, Murchison committed to the Arizona State Sun Devils for the 2021–22 season. Murchison played four years of college hockey with Arizona State, recording nine goals and 24 points in 146 regular season games.

=== Professional ===
The Philadelphia Flyers of the National Hockey League (NHL) selected Murchison in the fifth round, 158th overall, of the 2021 NHL entry draft. At the conclusion of his college hockey career, the Flyers signed Murchison to a two-year, entry-level contract on March 26, 2025. He joined the Lehigh Valley Phantoms, the Flyers' American Hockey League (AHL) affiliate, for the remainder of the 2024–25 season. There, he had one goal and two points in four games.

Murchison started the 2025–26 season with the Phantoms, recording one goal and four points in 21 games. On December 6, he was called up to the Flyers as a replacement for an injured Cam York. Murchison made his NHL debut on December 9, 2025, against the San Jose Sharks. Murchison returned to Lehigh on December 16 to make room for Rasmus Ristolainen, who was coming off of injury reserve.

== International play ==
Murchison represented the United States at the 2021 IIHF World U18 Championships in Frisco, Texas. He recorded one assist in five tournament games as Team USA lost to Sweden in the quarterfinal round.

== Career statistics ==
=== Regular season and playoffs ===
			Regular season					Playoffs
Season	Team	League	GP	G	A	Pts	PIM	GP	G	A	Pts	PIM
2019–20	U.S. National Development Team	USHL	30	1	4	5	58	—	—	—	—	—
2020–21	U.S. National Development Team	USHL	23	3	2	5	12	—	—	—	—	—
2021–22	Arizona State University	NCAA	35	4	3	7	76	—	—	—	—	—
2022–23	Arizona State University	NCAA	36	2	3	5	93	—	—	—	—	—
2023–24	Arizona State University	NCAA	37	3	4	7	62	—	—	—	—	—
2024–25	Arizona State University	NCHC	37	0	4	4	48	—	—	—	—	—
2024–25	Lehigh Valley Phantoms	AHL	4	1	1	2	6	—	—	—	—	—
2025–26	Lehigh Valley Phantoms	AHL	29	2	4	6	46	—	—	—	—	—
2025–26	Philadelphia Flyers	NHL	3	0	0	0	0	—	—	—	—	—
NHL totals			3	0	0	0	0	—	—	—	—	—

=== International ===
Year	Team	Event	Result	GP	G	A	Pts	PIM
2021	United States	U18	5th	5	0	1	1	2
Junior totals				5	0	1	1	2
