= Fabian Lysell =

Swedish ice hockey player (born 2003)

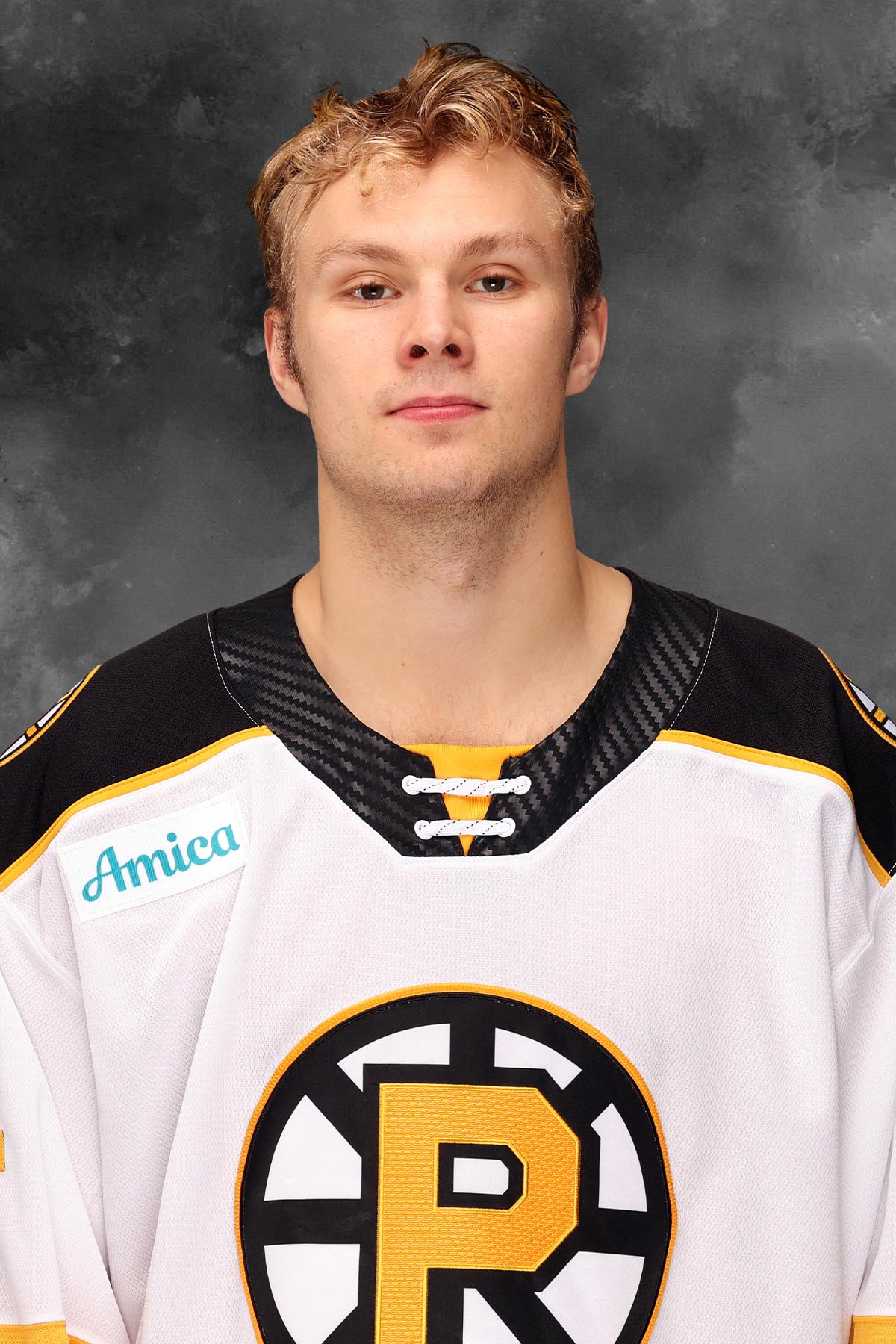
- Lysell with the Providence Bruins
- Born: 19 January 2003 (age 23) Gothenburg, Sweden
- Height: 5 ft 11 in (180 cm)
- Weight: 185 lb (84 kg; 13 st 3 lb)
- Position: Winger/Center
- Shoots: Right
- NHL team (P) Cur. team Former teams: Colorado Avalanche; Colorado Eagles (AHL); Luleå HF; Boston Bruins
- NHL draft: 21st overall, 2021; Boston Bruins
- Playing career: 2020–present

Fabian Lysell (born 19 January 2003) is a Swedish professional ice hockey forward for the Colorado Eagles of the American Hockey League (AHL) while under contract to the Colorado Avalanche of the National Hockey League (NHL). Lysell was selected by the Boston Bruins in the first round, 21st overall, of the 2021 NHL entry draft.

== Early life ==
Lysell was born on 19 January 2003, in Gothenburg, Sweden to parents Maria and Henrik. His mother is a former synchronized figure skater who competed in international tournaments. Although he was born and raised in Sweden, Lysell has ties to Western Canada and Boston through his mother.

== Playing career ==
Lysell spent his entire minor hockey career in Sweden with his hometown Frölunda HC in the J20 Nationell and J18 Elit League. After scoring 34 points in 14 games with Frölunda HC J18, Lysell was selected 30th overall by the Vancouver Giants in 2020 Canadian Hockey League Import Draft. While, he chose to return to Sweden for the 2020–21 season, he requested a transfer to Luleå HF after being passed over for Frölunda's Swedish Hockey League (SHL) team. The transfer allowed him to compete in the SHL, but significantly dropped his time on ice and points. Following his sole season in the SHL, Lysell was drafted in the first round of the 2021 NHL entry draft by the Boston Bruins. Shortly thereafter, he signed a three-year entry level contract with the Bruins with an annual NHL cap hit of $925,000.

Following the signing, Lysell was reassigned to the Vancouver Giants for the 2021–22 season. After scoring nine goals and 17 assists by December, Lysell was named to Team Sweden for the 2022 World Junior Ice Hockey Championships. However, he fell ill during the tournament and missed the team's first two games before the whole tournament was cancelled due to multiple COVID-19 outbreaks. Despite missing 13 games due to the tournament and illness, Lysell maintained his lead as the team's leading scorer.

Lysell made his NHL debut on 28 December 2024, in a 4–0 home victory over the Columbus Blue Jackets but was subsequently reassigned to Providence. He returned to the NHL on 22 March 2025, and registered his first NHL point on 8 April with an assist on a Casey Mittelstadt goal against the New Jersey Devils. On 13 April, Lysell scored his first NHL goal in a 4–1 road win against the Pittsburgh Penguins.

Lysell started the 2025–26 season with the Provindence Bruins. He scored his first AHL hat-trick in their season opener against the Charlotte Checkers. Lysell tallied six goals and five assists for 11 points through 11 games, which helped the team maintain a winning 11–1–0 record. In helping Providence claim the Macgregor Kilpatrick Trophy, as the top ranking regular season team, Lysell registered 17 goals and 42 points in 57 appearances. He made one Calder Cup Playoff game appearance before ending the season through injury.

As a pending restricted free agent, Lysell's tenure with the Bruins ended after he was traded at the 2026 NHL entry draft to the Colorado Avalanche in exchange for Ivan Ivan on 27 June 2026. He was later signed to a one-year, two-way contract with the Avalanche for the 2026–27 season on 14 July 2026.

== Career statistics ==
=== Regular season and playoffs ===
			Regular season					Playoffs
Season	Team	League	GP	G	A	Pts	PIM	GP	G	A	Pts	PIM
2019–20	Frölunda HC	J20	11	1	5	6	6	—	—	—	—	—
2020–21	Frölunda HC	J20	11	3	10	13	12	—	—	—	—	—
2020–21	Luleå HF	SHL	26	2	1	3	8	—	—	—	—	—
2021–22	Vancouver Giants	WHL	53	22	40	62	52	12	4	17	21	16
2022–23	Providence Bruins	AHL	54	14	23	37	46	3	0	1	1	4
2023–24	Providence Bruins	AHL	56	15	35	50	37	1	0	0	0	2
2024–25	Providence Bruins	AHL	52	11	23	34	38	7	0	2	2	8
2024–25	Boston Bruins	NHL	12	1	2	3	6	—	—	—	—	—
2025–26	Providence Bruins	AHL	57	17	25	42	51	1	0	0	0	2
SHL totals			26	2	1	3	8	—	—	—	—	—
NHL totals			12	1	2	3	6	—	—	—	—	—

Medal record

Ice hockey

Representing Sweden

World Junior Championships
Bronze medal – third place	2022 Canada	

IIHF U18 Championships
Bronze medal – third place	2021 United States	

=== International ===
Year	Team	Event	Result	GP	G	A	Pts	PIM
2019	Sweden	U17	6th	5	5	2	7	6
2021	Sweden	U18	3rd place, bronze medalist(s)	7	3	6	9	4
2022	Sweden	WJC	3rd place, bronze medalist(s)	7	2	4	6	0
2023	Sweden	WJC	4th	7	0	0	0	29
Junior totals				26	10	12	22	39

Awards and achievements
Preceded by John Beecher	Boston Bruins first-round draft pick 2021	Succeeded by Dean Letourneau
