= Christian Kyrou =

Canadian ice hockey player (born 2003)

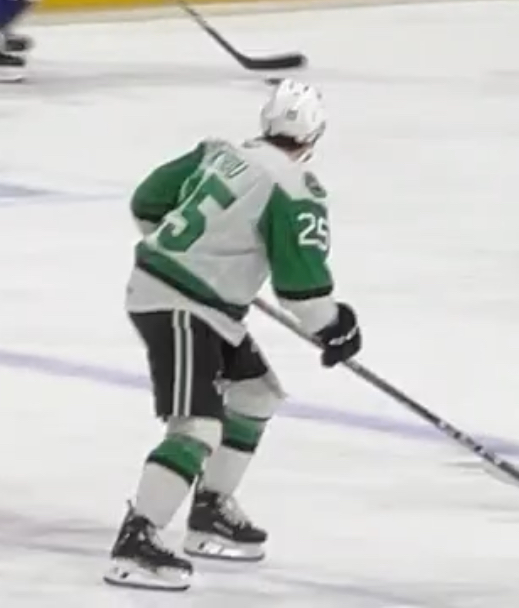
- Kyrou in 2024
- Born: September 3, 2003 (age 23) Toronto, Ontario, Canada
- Height: 5 ft 10 in (178 cm)
- Weight: 173 lb (78 kg; 12 st 5 lb)
- Position: Defence
- Shoots: Right
- NHL team (P) Cur. team: Ottawa Senators; Belleville Senators (AHL)
- NHL draft: 50th overall, 2022; Dallas Stars
- Playing career: 2023–present

Christian Kyrou (born September 16, 2003) is a Canadian ice hockey defenceman for the Belleville Senators of the American Hockey League (AHL) as a prospect to the Ottawa Senators of the National Hockey League (NHL). He was drafted by the Dallas Stars in the second round, 50th overall, of the 2022 NHL entry draft.

== Playing career ==
Kyrou started his junior career off in the 2019–20 OHL season, playing for the Erie Otters, where he would stay for around two more seasons. At some point in the 2022–23 season, Kyrou would transfer to Sarnia Sting, and in the 2023–24 season, Kyrou went to play on the Texas Stars team, leaving the OHL and moving into the AHL.

On October 30th, 2022, while playing for the Erie Otters, Kyrou scored his first hat trick in his career, against the Kitchener Rangers.

In his Sting season, he was dubbed the Cogeco OHL Player of the Week by the Ontario Hockey League for his game-winning goal and assist, sending the team into the 2023 OHL playoffs; for his contributions in their game they won against the London Knights; and for scoring the goal that won their match against the Windsor Spitfires. He was also chosen as an Ontario Hockey League all-star during his time at Sting.

One month into the 2025–26 season, on October 30, 2025, the Stars traded Kyrou to the Philadelphia Flyers in exchange for Samu Tuomaala. Following the season, he was not tendered a qualifying offer by the Flyers, making him an unrestricted free agent. On July 1, 2026, he signed a one-year, two-way contract with the Ottawa Senators. He was placed on waivers by the Senators at the end of training camp and after going unclaimed, was assigned to Ottawa's AHL affiliate, the Belleville Senators, to start the 2026–27 season.

== Personal life ==
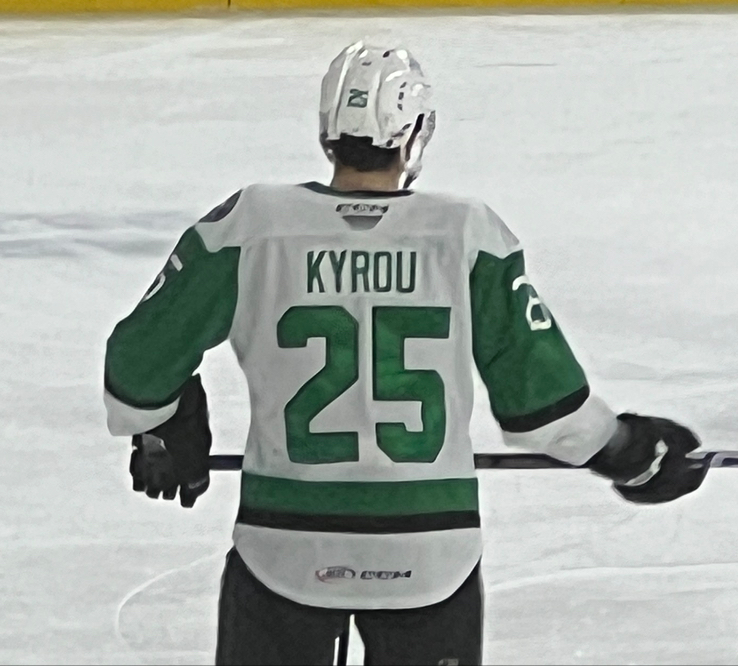
View of Kyrou's #25 jersey

Kyrou was born to Aki Kyrou and Roula Economou on September 16, 2003, and of Greek ancestry, his grandparents Iordanis and Maria moved to Toronto in the early 1960s, from Greece. He is the youngest of three siblings; his brother Jordan, who plays for the Washington Capitals, and a sister, Matina.

== Career statistics ==
			Regular season					Playoffs
Season	Team	League	GP	G	A	Pts	PIM	GP	G	A	Pts	PIM
2019–20	Erie Otters	OHL	21	0	0	0	2	—	—	—	—	—
2021–22	Erie Otters	OHL	68	18	42	60	44	—	—	—	—	—
2022–23	Erie Otters	OHL	27	8	28	36	24	—	—	—	—	—
2022–23	Sarnia Sting	OHL	37	12	29	41	20	14	1	8	9	6
2023–24	Texas Stars	AHL	57	8	15	23	22	7	1	6	7	0
2024–25	Texas Stars	AHL	36	4	11	15	2	—	—	—	—	—
2025–26	Texas Stars	AHL	4	0	0	0	0	—	—	—	—	—
2025–26	Lehigh Valley Phantoms	AHL	55	10	24	34	16	—	—	—	—	—
AHL totals			152	22	50	72	40	7	1	6	7	0
