= Anton Olsson (ice hockey) =

Swedish ice hockey player (born 2003)

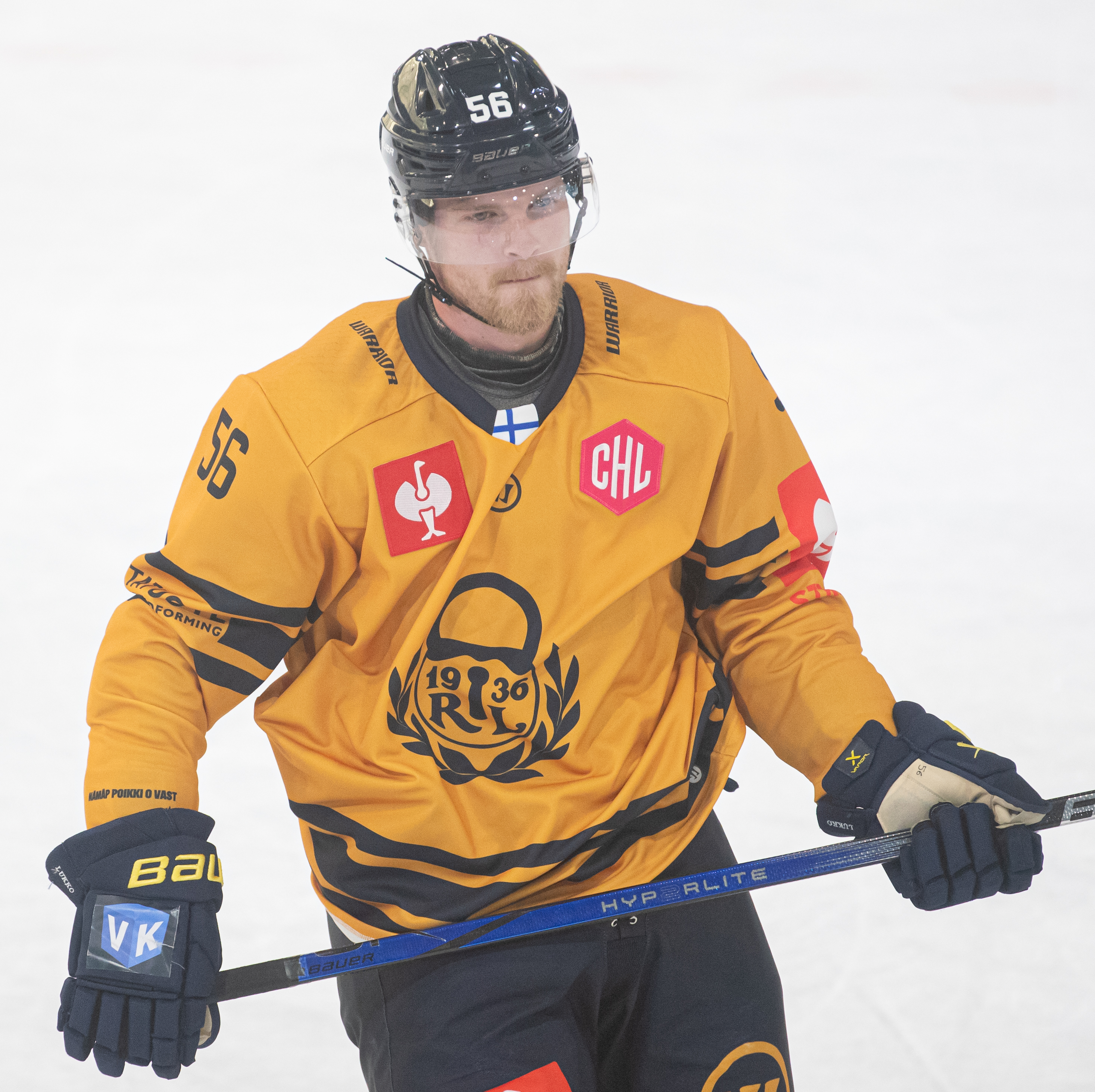
- Olsson in 2025
- Born: 26 January 2003 (age 23) Helsingborg, Sweden
- Height: 6 ft 0 in (183 cm)
- Weight: 183 lb (83 kg; 13 st 1 lb)
- Position: Defence
- Shoots: Left
- Liiga team Former teams: Lukko; Malmö Redhawks; Skellefteå AIK; Jukurit
- NHL draft: 72nd overall, 2021; Nashville Predators
- Playing career: 2020–present

Anton Olsson (born 26 January 2003) is a Swedish professional ice hockey defenceman for Lukko of the Liiga. Olsson was drafted in the third round, 72nd overall, by the Nashville Predators in the 2021 NHL entry draft.

== Career statistics ==
=== Regular season and playoffs ===
			Regular season					Playoffs
Season	Team	League	GP	G	A	Pts	PIM	GP	G	A	Pts	PIM
2018–19	Malmö Redhawks	J20	9	2	0	2	2	2	1	0	1	0
2019–20	Malmö Redhawks	J20	26	6	11	17	18	—	—	—	—	—
2019–20	Malmö Redhawks	SHL	5	0	0	0	0	—	—	—	—	—
2020–21	Malmö Redhawks	SHL	39	0	4	4	31	2	0	0	0	0
2020–21	Malmö Redhawks	J20	7	1	3	4	2	—	—	—	—	—
2021–22	Malmö Redhawks	SHL	39	2	4	6	6	—	—	—	—	—
2022–23	Skellefteå AIK	SHL	41	3	4	7	27	5	0	0	0	2
2022–23	Skellefteå AIK	J20	4	4	0	4	2	1	0	0	0	0
2023–24	Skellefteå AIK	SHL	18	0	1	1	0	14	0	1	1	4
2023–24	AIK IF	Allsv	7	0	0	0	0	3	0	0	0	4
2023–24	Jukurit	Liiga	7	2	1	3	29	—	—	—	—	—
2024–25	Lukko	Liiga	51	4	7	11	45	7	0	0	0	0
SHL totals			142	5	13	18	64	21	0	1	1	6
Liiga totals			58	6	8	14	74	7	0	0	0	0

Medal record

Representing Sweden

Ice hockey

World Junior Championships
Bronze medal – third place	2022 Canada	

=== International ===
Year	Team	Event	Result	GP	G	A	Pts	PIM
2019	Sweden	U17	6th	5	2	1	3	6
2021	Sweden	U18	3rd place, bronze medalist(s)	7	0	3	3	8
2022	Sweden	WJC	3rd place, bronze medalist(s)	4	0	1	1	0
Junior totals				16	2	5	7	14
