= Liam Dower Nilsson =

Swedish ice hockey player (born 2003)

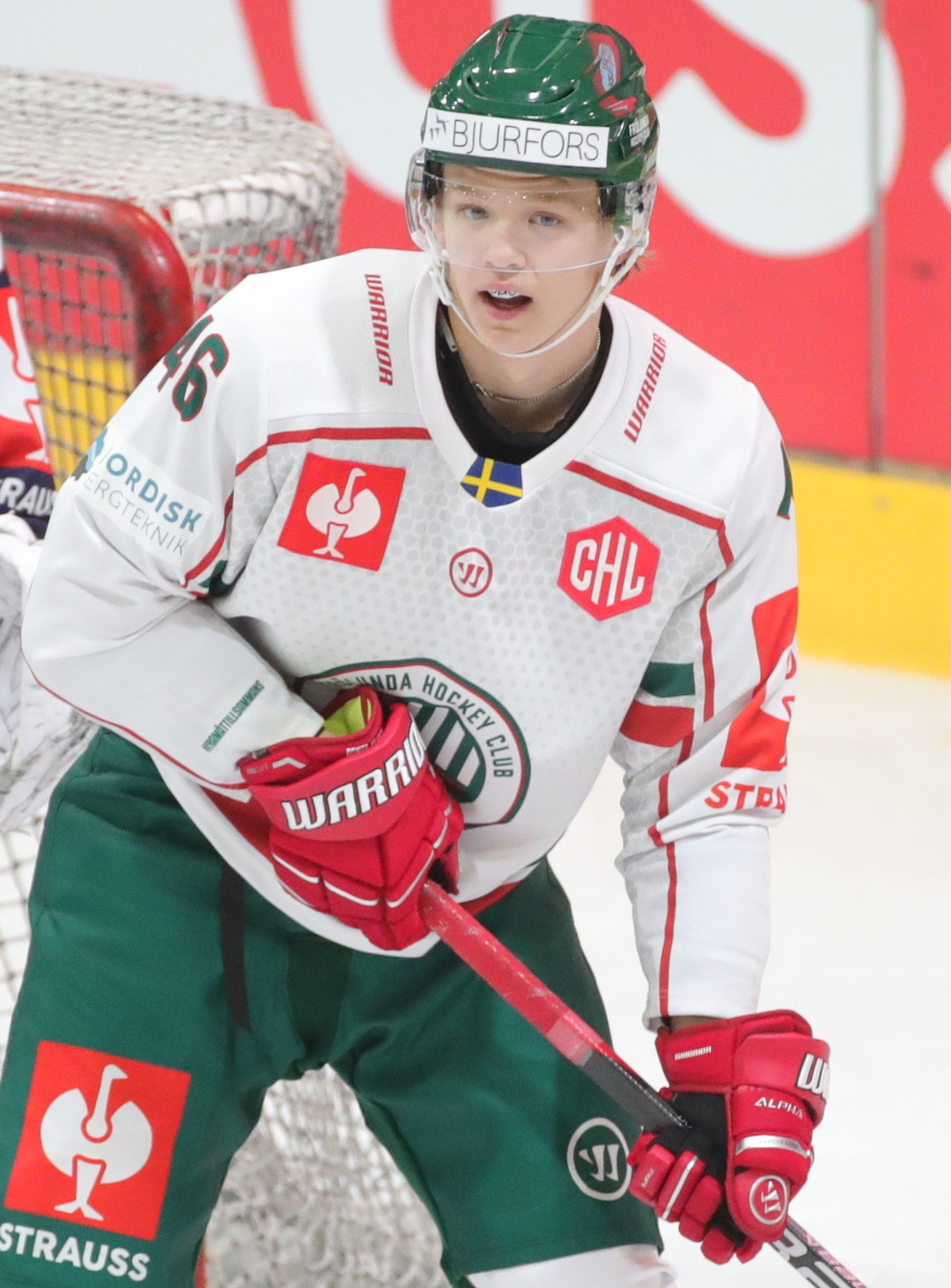
- Born: 14 April 2003 (age 22) Gothenburg, Sweden
- Height: 6 ft 0 in (183 cm)
- Weight: 176 lb (80 kg; 12 st 8 lb)
- Position: Centre
- Shoots: Left
- Allsv team Former teams: IF Björklöven; Frölunda HC
- NHL draft: 134th overall, 2021; Detroit Red Wings
- Playing career: 2020–present

Liam Dower Nilsson (born 14 April 2003) is a Swedish professional ice hockey centre for IF Björklöven of the HockeyAllsvenskan (Allsv). He was selected 134th overall by the Detroit Red Wings in the 2021 NHL entry draft.

== Playing career ==
Dower Nilsson made his professional debut for Frölunda HC during the 2020–21 season. He appeared in five games, and received a game misconduct penalty for high-sticking in his SHL debut.

Dower Nilsson was drafted in the fifth round, 134th overall, by the Detroit Red Wings in the 2021 NHL entry draft.

== International play ==
Medal record

Representing Sweden

Ice hockey

World U18 Championships
Bronze medal – third place	2021 United States	

Dower Nilsson served as captain of Sweden at the 2021 IIHF World U18 Championships, where he recorded one goal and three assists in seven games, and won a bronze medal.

== Personal life ==
Liam's brother, Noah, is a professional ice hockey player and was selected in the third round, 73rd overall, by the Red Wings in the 2023 NHL entry draft.

== Career statistics ==
=== Regular season and playoffs ===
			Regular season					Playoffs
Season	Team	League	GP	G	A	Pts	PIM	GP	G	A	Pts	PIM
2018–19	Frölunda HC	J18	7	7	2	9	2	—	—	—	—	—
2019–20	Frölunda HC	J18	15	12	22	34	14	—	—	—	—	—
2019–20	Frölunda HC	J20	5	1	0	1	2	—	—	—	—	—
2020–21	Frölunda HC	J20	16	5	12	17	10	—	—	—	—	—
2020–21	Frölunda HC	SHL	5	0	0	0	25	1	0	0	0	0
2020–21	Hanhals IF	Div.1	14	6	8	14	0	—	—	—	—	—
2021–22	Frölunda HC	J20	34	19	31	50	72	3	1	0	1	4
2021–22	Frölunda HC	SHL	10	0	0	0	2	—	—	—	—	—
2022–23	Västerås IK	Allsv	32	3	12	15	10	7	3	2	5	0
2022–23	Frölunda HC	SHL	22	1	4	5	0	—	—	—	—	—
2023–24	IF Björklöven	Allsv	52	12	15	27	10	4	1	4	5	0
2024–25	IF Björklöven	Allsv	52	20	21	41	26	5	0	1	1	2
SHL totals			37	1	4	5	27	1	0	0	0	0

=== International ===
Year	Team	Event	Result	GP	G	A	Pts	PIM
2017	Sweden	U17	8th	5	1	1	2	2
2021	Sweden	U18	3rd place, bronze medalist(s)	7	1	3	4	31
Junior totals				12	2	4	6	33
