= Niko Huuhtanen =

Finnish ice hockey player (born 2003)

- Born: 26 June 2003 (age 22) Helsinki, Finland
- Height: 188 cm (6 ft 2 in)
- Weight: 95 kg (209 lb; 14 st 13 lb)
- Position: Right wing
- Shoots: Right
- NL team Former teams: EHC Biel; Jukurit
- NHL draft: 224th overall, 2021; Tampa Bay Lightning
- Playing career: 2022–present

Niko Huuhtanen (born 26 June 2003) is a Finnish professional ice hockey player for EHC Biel of the National League. He was selected in the seventh round, 224th overall in the 2021 NHL entry draft by the Tampa Bay Lightning.

== Playing career ==
Huuhtanen played junior hockey with Blues, Tappara, and Everett Silvertips. In June 2022, he signed a two-year senior contract with Jukurit. He made his SM-liiga debut for Jukurit on September 14, 2022, against KooKoo. In June 2023, Huuhtanen won the Jarmo Wasama memorial trophy awarded to the best rookie of the season in SM-liiga. On November 11, 2023, Huuhtanen made his debut in Finland men's national ice hockey team, scoring on his debut.

On 17 May 2024, Huuhtanen signed his three-year entry-level contract with the Tampa Bay Lightning, who had selected him in the seventh round of the 2021 NHL entry draft.

On 3 December 2025, the Lightning and Huuhtanen mutually terminated his contract; he subsequently signed with EHC Biel of the Swiss National League on 5 December.

== Career statistics ==
=== Regular season and playoffs ===
			Regular season					Playoffs
Season	Team	League	GP	G	A	Pts	PIM	GP	G	A	Pts	PIM
2019–20	Kiekko-Espoo	U20	48	18	16	34	54	—	—	—	—	—
2020–21	Tappara	U20	37	20	14	34	73	2	1	0	1	0
2021–22	Everett Silvertips	WHL	65	37	40	77	85	5	5	5	10	10
2022–23	Jukurit	Liiga	48	17	13	30	72	—	—	—	—	—
2023–24	Jukurit	Liiga	52	19	27	46	46	6	0	3	3	33
2023–24	Syracuse Crunch	AHL	—	—	—	—	—	4	0	2	2	2
2024–25	Syracuse Crunch	AHL	51	8	12	20	47	1	0	0	0	0
2025–26	Syracuse Crunch	AHL	5	0	3	3	10	—	—	—	—	—
2025–26	Orlando Solar Bears	ECHL	1	0	0	0	0	—	—	—	—	—
Liiga totals			100	36	40	76	118	6	0	3	3	33

=== International ===
Year	Team	Event	Result	GP	G	A	Pts	PIM
2019	Finland	U17	7th	5	1	3	4	8
2021	Finland	U18	4th	7	2	3	5	4
2023	Finland	WJC	5th	5	2	1	3	4
Junior totals				17	5	7	12	16
