= 2021 IIHF World U18 Championships =

2021 edition of the IIHF World U18 Championships

2021 IIHF U18 World Championship

Tournament details
- Host country: United States
- Venues: 2 (in 2 host cities)
- Dates: April 26 – May 6
- Teams: 10

Final positions
- Champions: Canada (4th title)
- Runners-up: Russia
- Third place: Sweden
- Fourth place: Finland

Tournament statistics
- Games played: 28
- Goals scored: 221 (7.89 per game)
- Attendance: 21,038 (751 per game)
- Scoring leader: (Russia) Matvei Michkov (16 points)

Awards
- MVP: (Russia) Matvei Michkov

Official website
- IIHF.com

The 2021 IIHF World U18 Championship was the 22nd such event hosted by the International Ice Hockey Federation. Teams would have participated at several levels of competition. The competition also would have served as qualifications for the 2022 competition. All tournaments other than the top division tournament were cancelled by the IIHF on November 18, 2020, due to the COVID-19 pandemic. The United States finished without a medal for the first time since 2003.

== Top Division ==
The tournament was held from April 26 to May 6, 2021, in Frisco and Plano, United States.

=== Officials ===
The following officials were assigned by the International Ice Hockey Federation to officiate the 2021 World U18 Championships.

Referees

- (Czech Republic) Adam Kika
- (Finland) Riku Brander
- (Germany) Lukas Kohlmüller
- (Russia) Sergey Yudakov
- (Sweden) Christoffer Holm
- (Switzerland) Micha Hebeisen
- (United States) Sean Fernandez
- (United States) Sean MacFarlane
- (United States) Jacob Rekucki
- (United States) Stephen Reneau
- (United States) Peter Schlittenhardt
- (United States) Andrew Wilk

Linesmen

- (Belarus) Nikita Polyakov
- (Czech Republic) David Klouček
- (Finland) Tommi Niittylä
- (Latvia) Dāvis Zunde
- (Russia) Roman Slavikovskii
- (United States) Kevin Briganti
- (United States) Nick Briganti
- (United States) Jake Davis
- (United States) William Hancock
- (United States) Patrick Richardson

=== Preliminary round ===
All times are local (UTC–5).

==== Group A ====
Pos	Team	Pld	W	OTW	OTL	L	GF	GA	GD	Pts	Qualification
1	Canada	4	4	0	0	0	28	5	+23	12	Advance to Quarterfinals
2	Sweden	4	3	0	0	1	16	14	+2	9	Advance to Quarterfinals
3	Belarus	4	2	0	0	2	16	13	+3	6	Advance to Quarterfinals
4	Switzerland	4	1	0	0	3	6	19	−13	3	Advance to Quarterfinals
5	Latvia	4	0	0	0	4	6	21	−15	0	

Source: IIHF

April 26, 2021; 16:00	Belarus	1–5 (0–1, 1–2, 0–2)	Sweden	Children's Health StarCenter, Plano; Attendance: 150

Game reference

Ivan Zhigalov
Goalies
Carl Lindbom
Referees:
(Germany) Lukas Kohlmüller
(United States) Sean MacFarlane
Linesmen:
(Czech Republic) David Klouček
(United States) Patrick Richardson

	0–1	05:24 – Rosén (Olsson, Hävelid) (PP)
	0–2	21:50 – Lysell
Klimovich (Sidorov, Kuzmin) (PP) – 28:32	1–2
	1–3	38:12 – Eljas (Sjöberg, Kangas)
	1–4	58:20 – Persson (Hävelid)
	1–5	59:08 – Sjöholm (Persson, Hasa)

14 min
Penalties
8 min
30
Shots
44

April 26, 2021; 20:00	Latvia	2–4 (0–2, 2–2, 0–0)	Switzerland	Children's Health StarCenter, Plano; Attendance: 150

Game reference

Kārlis Mežsargs
Marks Slavinskis
Goalies
Kevin Pasche
Referees:
(United States) Stephen Reneau
(United States) Andrew Wilk
Linesmen:
(Finland) Tommi Niittylä
(Russia) Roman Slavikovskii

	0–1	12:02 – Jabola (Bichsel, Biasca) (PP)
	0–2	12:25 – Reichle (Robin, Sidler)
	0–3	24:42 – Bichsel (Biasca)
	0–4	25:06 – Robin (Zanetti, Sidler)
Ločmelis (Dukurs, Vilmanis) – 37:50	1–4
Ravinskis (Hodass, Silkalns) – 39:08	2–4

12 min
Penalties
6 min
41
Shots
29

April 27, 2021; 16:00	Switzerland	1–7 (0–1, 1–3, 0–3)	Belarus	Children's Health StarCenter, Plano; Attendance: 150

Game reference

Kevin Pasche
Matthieu Croce
Goalies
Tikhon Chayka
Referees:
(Sweden) Christoffer Holm
(Russia) Sergei Yudakov
Linesmen:
(United States) Jake Davis
(Latvia) Dāvis Zunde

	0–1	12:50 – Klimovich (Shilo, Sidorov) (PP)
	0–2	21:22 – Kuzmin (PP)
Truog (Sidler) – 21:42	1–2
	1–3	26:50 – Klimovich (Shilo, Klavdiev) (PP)
	1–4	29:07 – Klimovich (Shilo, Klavdiev) (PP)
	1–5	44:35 – Sotishvili (Nikolayenya, Rogach)
	1–6	54:37 – Anoshko (PS)
	1–7	58:27 – Sotishvili (SH)

12 min
Penalties
10 min
29
Shots
37

April 27, 2021; 20:00	Sweden	1–12 (0–4, 0–4, 1–4)	Canada	Children's Health StarCenter, Plano; Attendance: 150

Game reference

Carl Lindbom
Viggo Andrén
Goalies
Thomas Milic
Referees:
(Finland) Riku Brander
(United States) Sean Fernandez
Linesmen:
(United States) Nick Briganti
(Belarus) Nikita Polyakov

	0–1	05:19 – Wright (Clarke, Guenther) (PP)
	0–2	10:43 – Clarke (Pinelli)
	0–3	12:14 – Harrison (Bedard)
	0–4	13:29 – Pinelli (Stankoven, Roulette)
	0–5	20:30 – Wright (Othmann, Clarke)
	0–6	24:00 – Allan (Guenther)
	0–7	26:04 – Winterton (Johnston)
	0–8	38:57 – Wright (Matier) (SH)
	0–9	43:52 – McTavish (Ceulemans)
	0–10	47:16 – Clarke (Stillman, Pinelli)
Forsmark – 51:17	1–10
	1–11	52:37 – Johnston (Roulette)
	1–12	55:21 – Stankoven (McTavish)

4 min
Penalties
6 min
29
Shots
47

April 28, 2021; 20:00	Canada	4–2 (0–0, 2–1, 2–1)	Latvia	Children's Health StarCenter, Plano; Attendance: 150

Game reference

Benjamin Gaudreau
Goalies
Kārlis Mežsargs
Referees:
(United States) Sean MacFarlane
(United States) Jake Rekucki
Linesmen:
(Czech Republic) David Klouček
(United States) Patrick Richardson

Stankoven (Zellweger) (PP) – 27:58	1–0
McTavish (Stankoven, Bedard) – 30:01	2–0
	2–1	39:18 – Ravinskis (Laviņš)
Guenther (McTavish) – 50:38	3–1
	3–2	53:27 – Vilmanis (PP)
McTavish (Bedard, Guenther) (PP) – 59:17	4–2

16 min
Penalties
26 min
52
Shots
27

April 29, 2021; 16:00	Sweden	3–1 (0–0, 3–1, 0–0)	Switzerland	Children's Health StarCenter, Plano; Attendance: 150

Game reference

Carl Lindbom
Goalies
Kevin Pasche
Referees:
(United States) Stephen Reneau
(United States) Andrew Wilk
Linesmen:
(United States) William Hancock
(United States) Tommi Niittylä

	0–1	22:59 – Bougro (Nicolet, Greuter)
Rosén (Lysell, Robertsson) (PP) – 32:00	1–1
Dower Nilsson (Lysell, Edvinsson) (PP) – 34:15	2–1
Sundin (Dower Nilsson, Edvinsson) (PP) – 35:44	3–1

35 min
Penalties
58 min
27
Shots
26

April 29, 2021; 20:00	Belarus	6–2 (1–0, 3–1, 2–1)	Latvia	Children's Health StarCenter, Plano; Attendance: 150

Game reference

Tikhon Chayka
Goalies
Marks Slavinskis
Linards Lipskis
Referees:
(Germany) Lukas Kohlmüller
(United States) Jake Rekucki
Linesmen:
(Czech Republic) David Klouček
(United States) Patrick Richardson

Nikolayenya (Anoshko, Sidorov) – 02:24	1–0
Klimovich (Kuzmin, Sidorov) (PP2) – 20:49	2–0
Klavdiev (Sazanovich, Kuzmin) – 22:59	3–0
	3–1	23:33 – Laviņš (Purmalis, Ozoliņš) (PP)
Klimovich (Kuzmin) (PP) – 38:26	4–1
Morozov (Ignatenko, Loshko) – 49:55	5–1
Mikhalyov (Sidorov) – 57:19	6–1
	6–2	58:41 – Dārziņš

8 min
Penalties
18 min
41
Shots
32

April 30, 2021; 20:00	Switzerland	0–7 (0–2, 0–2, 0–3)	Canada	Children's Health StarCenter, Plano; Attendance: 150

Game reference

Mathieu Croce
Goalies
Thomas Milic
Referees:
(Finland) Riku Brander
(Czech Republic) Adam Kika
Linesmen:
(United States) Nick Briganti
(Belarus) Nikita Polyakov

0–1	10:50 – Guenther (Clarke) (PP)
0–2	14:05 – Bedard (Stankoven)
0–3	21:48 – Pinelli (Zhilkin, Zellweger)
0–4	25:10 – Pinelli (Ceulemans) (PP)
0–5	50:11 – Othmann (Pinelli, Zellweger) (PP)
0–6	55:49 – Ceulemans (Zellweger) (PP2)
0–7	56:29 – Pinelli (Ceulemans, Zellweger) (PP2)

18 min
Penalties
4 min
11
Shots
39

May 1, 2021; 16:00	Latvia	0–7 (0–1, 0–1, 0–5)	Sweden	Children's Health StarCenter, Plano; Attendance: 150

Game reference

Linards Lipskis
Goalies
Hugo Hävelid
Referees:
(Switzerland) Micha Hebeisen
(United States) Andrew Wilk
Linesmen:
(Finland) Tommi Niittylä
(Russia) Roman Slavikovskii

0–1	04:54 – Strömgren
0–2	27:09 – Sjöberg (Eljas, Ostlund)
0–3	40:59 – Strömgren (Moberg, Hävelid) (PP)
0–4	45:22 – Robertsson (Lysell)
0–5	48:10 – Robertsson (Dower Nilsson, Lysell)
0–6	57:17 – Rosen (Forsmark)
0–7	59:06 – Persson

33 min
Penalties
10 min
30
Shots
35

May 1, 2021; 20:00	Canada	5–2 (2–0, 2–1, 1–1)	Belarus	Children's Health StarCenter, Plano; Attendance: 150

Game reference

Benjamin Gaudreau
Goalies
Ivan Zhigalov
Yan Shostak
Referees:
(Sweden) Christoffer Holm
(United States) Peter Schlittenhardt
Linesmen:
(United States) Nick Briganti
(Latvia) Dāvis Zunde

Wright – 05:06	1–0
Zellweger (Johnston) – 18:34	2–0
McTavish (Ceulemans) – 21:59	3–0
Wright (Zellweger) – 24:04	4–0
	4–1	34:28 – Loshko (Mikhalyov, Sotishvili) (PP)
McTavish (Ceulemans, Pinelli) (PP) – 53:45	5–1
	5–2	57:28 – Morozov (Mikhalyov, Polshakov)

10 min
Penalties
45 min
33
Shots
26

==== Group B ====
Pos	Team	Pld	W	OTW	OTL	L	GF	GA	GD	Pts	Qualification
1	Finland	4	2	1	1	0	24	13	+11	9 (Note: Finland 4–3 (GWS) Russia)	Advance to Quarterfinals
2	Russia	4	2	1	1	0	27	12	+15	9	Advance to Quarterfinals
3	United States (H)	4	1	2	1	0	18	15	+3	8	Advance to Quarterfinals
4	Czech Republic	4	1	0	1	2	10	20	−10	4	Advance to Quarterfinals
5	Germany	4	0	0	0	4	5	24	−19	0	

Source: IIHF
(H) Host
Notes:

April 26, 2021; 16:00	Czech Republic	3–1 (0–0, 2–0, 1–1)	Germany	Comerica Center, Frisco; Attendance: 1,400

Game reference

Tomáš Suchánek
Goalies
Nikita Quapp
Referees:
(United States) Peter Schlittenhardt
(Russia) Sergei Yudakov
Linesmen:
(United States) Nick Briganti
(Latvia) Dāvis Zunde

Pajer (Kos, Brabenec) (PP) – 20:49	1–0
Szturc (SH) – 35:53	2–0
Ryšavý (D. Moravec, Hamara) (PP) – 49:35	3–0
	3–1	55:37 – Proske (Klein, Heigl)

12 min
Penalties
12 min
40
Shots
19

April 26, 2021; 20:00	Russia	7–6 OT (1–3, 4–3, 1–0); OT: (1–0)	United States	Comerica Center, Frisco; Attendance: 1,400

Game reference

Kirill Gerasimyuk
Valeri Brinkman
Goalies
Gibson Homer
Referees:
(Finland) Riku Brander
(Czech Republic) Adam Kika
Linesmen:
(United States) Kevin Briganti
(Belarus) Nikita Polyakov

	0–1	02:56 – Chesley
	0–2	05:24 – Duke (Hutson, Pastujov) (PP)
Yurov (Chibrikov, Makarov) – 09:18	1–2
	1–3	16:44 – Behrens (Hutson, Cooley) (PP)
	1–4	21:27 – Straky (Howard, Stramel)
	1–5	24:16 – Pastujov (Hutson, Behrens) (PP)
Michkov (Gaidamak, Novikov) – 26:16	2–5
Gaidamak (Grudinin, Chibrikov) – 28:09	3–5
Michkov (Grudinin, Petrov) (PP) – 33:09	4–5
	4–6	36:36 – Duke (Pastujov, Behrens)
Miroshnichenko (Koromyslov, Svechkov) (PP) – 39:12	5–6
Miroshnichenko (Svechkov, Yurov) – 54:44	6–6
Chibrikov (Ivantsov) – 61:25	7–6

30 min
Penalties
8 min
35
Shots
35

April 27, 2021; 16:00	Finland	4–3 GWS (0–1, 1–2, 2–0); OT: (0–0); SO: (1–0)	Russia	Comerica Center, Frisco; Attendance: 806

Game reference

Aku Koskenvuo
Goalies
Sergei Ivanov
Referees:
(Germany) Lukas Kohlmüller
(United States) Jake Rekucki
Linesmen:
(United States) William Hancock
(Czech Republic) David Klouček

	0–1	09:21 – Svechkov (Yurov, Miroshnichenko)
Salminen (Juusola, Lambert) – 21:25	1–1
	1–2	24:07 – Chibrikov (Michkov)
	1–3	37:53 – Svechkov (Yurov)
Koivunen (Heimosalmi) – 57:25	2–3
Tuomaala (Lambert, Koivunen) (EA) – 58:34	3–3

Miettinen
Lambert (miss)
Koivunen
Kemell (miss)
Shootout
(miss) Petrov
(miss) Michkov
(miss) Buchelnikov
(miss) Yurov
4 min
Penalties
12 min
56
Shots
28

April 27, 2021; 20:00	Germany	3–5 (1–2, 1–1, 1–2)	United States	Comerica Center, Frisco; Attendance: 826

Game reference

Simon Wolf
Goalies
Gibson Homer
Referees:
(Switzerland) Micha Hebeisen
(United States) Andrew Wilk
Linesmen:
(Finland) Tommi Niittylä
(Russia) Roman Slavikovskii

	0–1	09:29 – Hughes (Murchison, Devine)
	0–2	16:31 – Gallagher (Hreschuk, Howard) (PP)
Zap – 19:21	1–2
	1–3	32:40 – Pastujov (Cooley)
Roßmy (Lutz) (PP2) – 38:18	2–3
	2–4	47:35 – Stramel
Cimmerman (Heigl) – 51:48	3–4
	3–5	56:49 – Gallagher (Howard) (PP)

34 min
Penalties
10 min
28
Shots
42

April 28, 2021; 20:00	Czech Republic	5–6 (2–1, 1–2, 2–3)	Finland	Comerica Center, Frisco; Attendance: 402

Game reference

Tomáš Suchánek
Goalies
Aku Koskenvuo
Referees:
(Sweden) Christoffer Holm
(United States) Peter Schlittenhardt
Linesmen:
(United States) Nick Briganti
(United States) Jake Davis

Szturc (Chmelař) – 00:30	1–0
Pinkas (P. Moravec) – 03:55	2–0
	2–1	11:01 – Koivunen (Heimosalmi, Juusola)
	2–2	23:53 – Matikka (Juusola, Huuhtanen)
	2–3	24:58 – Heimosalmi
Marha (D. Moravec, Ryšavý) – 28:14	3–3
D. Moravec – 42:13	4–3
Altrichter (Pajer, Brabenec) (PP) – 44:14	5–3
	5–4	52:11 – Tuomaala (Suomi, Lambert) (PP)
	5–5	56:31 – Salminen (Tuomaala, Lambert) (PP)
	5–6	59:41 – Tuomaala (Koivunen, Salminen) (PP)

24 min
Penalties
10 min
33
Shots
31

April 29, 2021; 16:00	Germany	1–6 (0–1, 0–3, 1–2)	Russia	Comerica Center, Frisco; Attendance: 1,663

Game reference

Nikita Quapp
Goalies
Sergei Ivanov
Referees:
(United States) Sean Fernandez
(Czech Republic) Adam Kika
Linesmen:
(United States) Jake Davis
(Belarus) Nikita Polyakov

	0–1	10:44 – Yurov (Svechkov)
	0–2	20:30 – Michkov (Chibrikov, Novikov)
	0–3	27:12 – Michkov (Grudinin, Chibrikov)
	0–4	35:29 – Michkov (Poltapov, Ivantsov) (PP)
	0–5	45:48 – Kvochko (Chibrikov, Figurin)
Korte (Zap, Roßmy) – 54:31	1–5
	1–6	58:19 – Michkov (Figurin)

27 min
Penalties
4 min
17
Shots
40

April 29, 2021; 20:00	United States	2–1 GWS (0–1, 0–0, 1–0); OT: (0–0); SO: (1–0)	Czech Republic	Comerica Center, Frisco; Attendance: 1,740

Game reference
Kaidan Mbereko; Gibson Homer	Goalies	Oliver Šatný	Referees: (Sweden) Christoffer Holm (Russia) Sergei Yudakov; Linesmen: (United States) Nick Briganti (Latvia) Dāvis Zunde
/ 0–1 / 15:57 – Ryšavý (P. Moravec, Altrichter); Pastujov (Hutson) – 42:35 / 1–1			Referees: (Sweden) Christoffer Holm (Russia) Sergei Yudakov; Linesmen: (United States) Nick Briganti (Latvia) Dāvis Zunde
Schmidt (miss); Hutson; St. Louis (miss); Cooley (miss); Pastujov (miss)	Shootout	(miss) Altrichter; (miss) Szturc; (miss) Brabenec; (miss) Skuhrovec; (miss) Šapovaliv	Referees: (Sweden) Christoffer Holm (Russia) Sergei Yudakov; Linesmen: (United States) Nick Briganti (Latvia) Dāvis Zunde
6 min	Penalties	6 min	Referees: (Sweden) Christoffer Holm (Russia) Sergei Yudakov; Linesmen: (United States) Nick Briganti (Latvia) Dāvis Zunde
31	Shots	33	Referees: (Sweden) Christoffer Holm (Russia) Sergei Yudakov; Linesmen: (United States) Nick Briganti (Latvia) Dāvis Zunde

April 30, 2021; 20:00	Finland	10–0 (5–0, 3–0, 2–0)	Germany	Comerica Center, Frisco; Attendance: 772

Game reference

Juuso Helomaa
Goalies
Luca Ganz
Referees:
(Switzerland) Micha Hebeisen
(United States) Stephen Reneau
Linesmen:
(United States) William Hancock
(Russia) Roman Slavikovskii

Malinen (Yliniemi, Väisänen) – 01:52	1–0
Huuhtanen (Vilén, Järvelä) – 02:11	2–0
Päivärinta (Vilén) – 07:02	3–0
Tuomaala (Suomi) (PP2) – 08:24	4–0
Kemell (Heimosalmi, Päivärinta) (PP) – 13:13	5–0
Huuhtanen (Päivärinta) (PP2) – 25:35	6–0
Salminen (Tuomaala, Suomi) (PP) – 26:23	7–0
Juusola (Salminen, Koivunen) – 39:59	8–0
Salminen (Koivunen, Tuomaala) (PP) – 48:52	9–0
Koivunen (Heimosalmi) – 53:13	10–0

8 min
Penalties
36 min
43
Shots
23

May 1, 2021; 16:00	Russia	11–1 (3–0, 3–1, 5–0)	Czech Republic	Comerica Center, Frisco; Attendance: 1,989

Game reference

Sergei Ivanov
Goalies
Tomáš Suchánek
Oliver Šatný
Referees:
(Germany) Lukas Kohlmüller
(United States) Sean MacFarlane
Linesmen:
(United States) William Hancock
(United States) Patrick Richardson

Michkov (Chibrikov, Novikov) – 01:22	1–0
Poltapov – 13:10	2–0
Miroshnichenko (Yurov) (PP) – 17:39	3–0
Koromyslov (Yurov, Chibrikov) – 30:53	4–0
	4–1	32:28 – Kos (P. Moravec, Brabenec)
Katelevski (Lazutin, Grudinin) – 33:44	5–1
Poltapov (Ivantsov, Michkov) (PP) – 38:45	6–1
Michkov (Poltapov, Ivantsov) – 45:50	7–1
Svechkov (Yurov) – 47:00	8–1
Svechkov (Chibrikov, Miroshnichenko) (PP) – 51:45	9–1
Yurov – 57:19	10–1
Michkov (Kvochko, Ivantsov) – 58:48	11–1

2 min
Penalties
37 min
40
Shots
22

May 1, 2021; 20:00	United States	5–4 OT (1–2, 2–0, 1–2); OT: (1–0)	Finland	Comerica Center, Frisco; Attendance: 2,057

Game reference

Kaidan Mbereko
Goalies
Aku Koskenvuo
Referees:
(Finland) Riku Brander
(United States) Sean Fernandez
Linesmen:
(United States) Nick Briganti
(United States) Jake Davis

Duke (Hughes, Pastujov) – 08:13	1–0
	1–1	08:43 – Koivunen (Vilén, Tuomaala)
	1–2	16:05 – Järvelä (Huuhtanen)
Stramel (Hreschuk) – 21:18	2–2
Howard (Hutson) – 33:46	3–2
	3–3	40:29 – Tuomaala (Koivunen, Salminen)
	3–4	53:26 – Yliniemi (Juusola, Matikka)
Gallagher (Stramel, Gilmartin) (EA) – 59:58	4–4
Pastujov – 60:57	5–4

8 min
Penalties
16 min
43
Shots
33

=== Playoff round ===
Winning teams were reseeded for the semifinals in accordance with the following ranking:

1. higher position in the group
2. higher number of points
3. better goal difference
4. higher number of goals scored for
5. better seeding coming into the tournament (final placement at the 2019 IIHF World U18 Championships).

Rank	Team	Group	Pos	Pts	GD	GF	Seed
1	Canada	A	1	12	+23	28	4
2	Finland	B	1	9	+11	24	7
3	Russia	B	2	9	+15	27	2
4	Sweden	A	2	9	+2	16	1
5	United States	B	3	8	+3	18	3
6	Belarus	A	3	6	+3	16	5
7	Czech Republic	B	4	4	–10	10	6
8	Switzerland	A	4	3	−13	6	9

==== Bracket ====
Quarterfinals
May 3 – Plano
2B Russia	5
3A Belarus	2
May 3 – Frisco
1A Canada	10
4B Czech Republic	3
May 3 – Plano
1B Finland	2
4A Switzerland	0
May 3 – Frisco
2A Sweden	5
3B United States	2

Semifinals
May 5 – Frisco
1 Canada	8
4 Sweden	1
May 5 – Frisco
2 Finland	5
3 Russia	6

Gold Medal Game
May 6 – Frisco
1 Canada	5
3 Russia	3
Bronze Medal Game
May 6 – Frisco
2 Finland	0
4 Sweden	8

==== Quarterfinals ====
May 3, 2021; 12:30	Russia	5–2 (2–0, 1–2, 2–0)	Belarus	Children's Health StarCenter, Plano; Attendance: 150

Game reference

Sergei Ivanov
Goalies
Tikhon Chayka
Referees:
(Switzerland) Micha Hebeisen
(United States) Andrew Wilk
Linesmen:
(United States) Nick Briganti
(Latvia) Dāvis Zunde

Michkov (Kvochko, Buchelnikov) – 04:26	1–0
Yurov (Koromyslov) (PP2) – 15:18	2–0
Duda (Yurov, Svechkov) – 22:48	3–0
	3–1	27:55 – Morozov (Mikhalyov, Rogach)
	3–2	31:17 – Nikolayenya (Anoshko)
Miroshnichenko – 46:23	4–2
Gaidamak – 48:34	5–2

8 min
Penalties
6 min
29
Shots
32

May 3, 2021; 15:00	Canada	10–3 (4–1, 2–1, 4–1)	Czech Republic	Comerica Center, Frisco; Attendance: 724

Game reference

Benjamin Gaudreau
Goalies
Tomáš Suchánek
Oliver Šatný
Referees:
(United States) Sean Fernandez
(United States) Jake Rekucki
Linesmen:
(United States) Jake Davis
(Belarus) Nikita Polyakov

Johnston (Bedard, McTavish) – 02:01	1–0
Roulette – 04:20	2–0
Bedard (Zhilkin, McTavish) – 06:50	3–0
	3–1	08:31 – Pajer (Brabenec) (PP)
Stankoven (Bedard) – 10:59	4–1
Guenther (Wright, Bedard) (PP) – 21:09	5–1
	5–2	23:57 – Chmelař (Szturc)
Guenther (Del Mastro, Othmann) – 36:14	6–2
Bedard (Stankoven, McTavish) – 46:54	7–2
Winterton (Roulette, Pinellil) – 47:09	8–2
	8–3	48:33 – Szturc (Marcel, Svozil)
Harrison (Pinelli, Winterton) – 49:46	9–3
Wright (Zellweger) (PP) – 53:17	10–3

8 min
Penalties
4 min
34
Shots
32

May 3, 2021; 17:30	Finland	2–0 (0–0, 1–0, 1–0)	Switzerland	Children's Health StarCenter, Plano; Attendance: 150

Game reference
Aku Koskenvuo	Goalies	Kevin Pasche	Referees: (Sweden) Christoffer Holm (United States) Peter Schlittenhardt; Linesmen: (Finland) Tommi Niittyla (Russia) Roman Slavikovski
Salminen (Matikka, Tuomaala) (PP) – 39:56 / 1–0; Heimosalmi – 50:42 / 2–0			Referees: (Sweden) Christoffer Holm (United States) Peter Schlittenhardt; Linesmen: (Finland) Tommi Niittyla (Russia) Roman Slavikovski
2 min	Penalties	20 min	Referees: (Sweden) Christoffer Holm (United States) Peter Schlittenhardt; Linesmen: (Finland) Tommi Niittyla (Russia) Roman Slavikovski
25	Shots	23	Referees: (Sweden) Christoffer Holm (United States) Peter Schlittenhardt; Linesmen: (Finland) Tommi Niittyla (Russia) Roman Slavikovski

May 3, 2021; 20:00	Sweden	5–2 (1–0, 1–1, 3–1)	United States	Comerica Center, Frisco; Attendance: 1,042

Game reference

Carl Lindbom
Goalies
Kaidan Mbereko
Gibson Homer
Referees:
(Germany) Lukas Kohlmüller
(Russia) Sergei Yudakov
Linesmen:
(Czech Republic) David Klouček
(United States) Patrick Richardson

Hävelid (Rosén, Olsson) (PP) – 03:09	1–0
	1–1	33:00 – Pastujov (Duke, Behrens) (PP)
Lysell – 33:43	2–1
Lysell (Dower Nilsson) – 41:26	3–1
Moberg (Strömgren, Rosén) (PP) – 54:25	4–1
	4–2	58:04 – Savage (EA)
Rosén (Hasa) (ENG) – 59:57	5–2

12 min
Penalties
12 min
28
Shots
33

==== Semifinals ====
May 5, 2021; 16:00	Canada	8–1 (0–0, 2–1, 6–0)	Sweden	Comerica Center, Frisco; Attendance: 574

Game reference

Benjamin Gaudreau
Goalies
Carl Lindbom
Referees:
(United States) Sean Macfarlane
(United States) Jake Rekucki
Linesmen:
(Czech Republic) David Klouček
(United States) Patrick Richardson

Bedard (McTavish) – 23:50	1–0
	1–1	25:00 – Rosén (Lysell, Edvinsson) (PP2)
Stillman (Wright) – 29:51	2–1
Bedard (Wright, Ceulemans) – 40:45	3–1
Othmann (Wright) (PP) – 43:40	4–1
Pinellil – 50:41	5–1
Wright (Othmann) – 54:52	6–1
Bedard (Allan) – 55:30	7–1
Roulette (Clarke, Winterton) – 56:56	8–1

10 min
Penalties
8 min
56
Shots
17

May 5, 2021; 20:00	Finland	5–6 (2–2, 0–2, 3–2)	Russia	Comerica Center, Frisco; Attendance: 819

Game reference

Aku Koskenvuo
Goalies
Sergei Ivanov
Referees:
(Sweden) Christoffer Holm
(United States) Stephen Briganti
Linesmen:
(United States) Kevin Briganti
(United States) William Hancock

	0–1	03:08 – Lazutin (Chibrikov, Novikov)
Salminen (Koivunen, Tuomaala) (PP) – 04:04	1–1
	1–2	06:58 – Michkov (Poltapov) (PP)
Miettinen (Juusola, Matikka) – 09:01	2–2
	2–3	33:15 – Chibrikov (Lazutin, Poltapov) (PP)
	2–4	37:20 – Chibrikov (Buchelnikov)
	2–5	43:43 – Miroshnichenko (Novikov, Svechkov) (PP)
Kemell (Heimosalmi, Lambert) (PP) – 46:14	3–5
	3–6	50:46 – Miroshnichenko (Svechkov)
Salminen (Vilén) – 50:53	4–6
Kemell (Huuhtanen, Heimosalmi) – 57:08	5–6

10 min
Penalties
8 min
24
Shots
38

==== Bronze medal game ====
May 6, 2021; 16:00	Finland	0–8 (0–2, 0–2, 0–4)	Sweden	Comerica Center, Frisco; Attendance: 902

Game reference

Juuso Helomaa
Aku Koskenvuo
Goalies
Carl Lindbom
Referees:
(United States) Sean Fernandez
(Russia) Sergey Yudakov
Linesmen:
(United States) Nick Briganti
(Russia) Roman Slavikovskii

0–1	05:00 – Rosén (Strömgren, Moberg) (PP)
0–2	19:23 – Robertsson (Lysell)
0–3	23:31 – Edvinsson
0–4	25:30 – Sjöberg (Persson)
0–5	45:53 – Moberg (Strömgren, Olsson) (PP)
0–6	51:19 – Hasa (SH, ENG)
0–7	54:55 – Ostlund (Eljas, Kangas)
0–8	59:23 – Rosén (SH)

6 min
Penalties
8 min
35
Shots
36

==== Gold medal game ====
May 6, 2021; 20:00	Canada	5–3 (2–2, 2–0, 1–1)	Russia	Comerica Center, Frisco; Attendance: 2,122

Game reference

Benjamin Gaudreau
Goalies
Sergei Ivanov
Referees:
(Sweden) Christoffer Holm
(United States) Stephen Reneau
Linesmen:
(United States) Jake Davis
(United States) William Hancock

	0–1	05:13 – Michkov (Lazutin, Poltapov)
Bedard (Ceulemans, Stillman) – 15:59	1–1
	1–2	18:05 – Buchelnikov (Michkov, Figurin)
Wright (Zellweger) (PP) – 19:15	2–2
Othmann (Del Mastro) – 24:42	3–2
Stankoven (Clarke, Wright) – 36:39	4–2
	4–3	49:37 – Grudinin (Michkov) (PP)
Wright (Bedard) (ENG) – 59:20	5–3

10 min
Penalties
6 min
34
Shots
34

=== Final standings ===
Pos	Grp	Team	Pld	W	OTW	OTL	L	GF	GA	GD	Pts	Final result
1	A	Canada	7	7	0	0	0	51	12	+39	21	Champions
2	B	Russia	7	4	1	1	1	41	24	+17	15	Runners-up
3	A	Sweden	7	5	0	0	2	30	24	+6	15	Third place
4	B	Finland	7	3	1	1	2	31	27	+4	12	Fourth place
5	B	United States (H)	5	1	2	1	1	20	20	0	8	Eliminated in Quarterfinals
6	A	Belarus	5	2	0	0	3	18	18	0	6	Eliminated in Quarterfinals
7	B	Czech Republic	5	1	0	1	3	13	30	−17	4	Eliminated in Quarterfinals
8	A	Switzerland	5	1	0	0	4	6	21	−15	3	Eliminated in Quarterfinals
9	A	Latvia	4	0	0	0	4	6	21	−15	0	Eliminated in Preliminary round
10	B	Germany	4	0	0	0	4	5	24	−19	0	Eliminated in Preliminary round

Source: IIHF
(H) Host

=== Statistics ===
==== Scoring leaders ====
Pos	Player	Country	GP	G	A	Pts	+/−	PIM
1	Matvei Michkov	Russia	7	12	4	16	+7	4
2	Shane Wright	Canada	5	9	5	14	+12	2
3	Connor Bedard	Canada	7	7	7	14	+12	2
4	Nikita Chibrikov	Russia	7	4	9	13	+7	14
5	Mason McTavish	Canada	7	5	6	11	+10	10
5	Samu Tuomaala	Finland	7	5	6	11	0	0
7	Francesco Pinelli	Canada	7	4	7	11	+8	0
7	Danila Yurov	Russia	7	4	7	11	+4	2
9	Ville Koivunen	Finland	7	4	6	10	−2	0
9	Fedor Svechkov	Russia	7	4	6	10	+4	4

GP = Games played; G = Goals; A = Assists; Pts = Points; +/− = Plus–minus; PIM = Penalties In Minutes
Source: IIHF

==== Goaltending leaders ====
(minimum 40% team's total ice time)

Pos	Player	Country	TOI	GA	GAA	SA	Sv%	SO
1	Benjamin Gaudreau	Canada	300:00	11	2.20	136	91.91	0
2	Carl Lindbom	Sweden	313:29	16	3.06	194	91.75	1
3	Kaidan Mbereko	United States	147:29	7	2.85	82	91.46	0
4	Sergei Ivanov	Russia	364:23	16	2.63	183	91.26	0
5	Tikhon Chaika	Belarus	180:00	8	2.67	90	91.11	0

TOI = Time on ice (minutes:seconds); GA = Goals against; GAA = Goals against average; SA = Shots against; Sv% = Save percentage; SO = Shutouts
Source: IIHF

=== Awards ===
- Best players selected by the Directorate:
  - Best Goaltender: (Canada) Benjamin Gaudreau
  - Best Defenceman: (Finland) Aleksi Heimosalmi
  - Best Forward: (Russia) Matvei Michkov

Source: IIHF

- Media All-Stars:
  - MVP: (Russia) Matvei Michkov
  - Goaltender: (Russia) Sergei Ivanov
  - Defencemen: (Finland) Aleksi Heimosalmi / (Canada) Brandt Clarke
  - Forwards: (Canada) Connor Bedard / (Russia) Matvei Michkov / (Finland) Samu Tuomaala

Source: IIHF

== Division I ==
All lower division tournaments were cancelled by the IIHF.

=== Group A ===
The tournament was to be held in Spišská Nová Ves, Slovakia, from April 5 to 11, 2021.

- Denmark
- France
- Japan
- Kazakhstan
- Norway
- Slovakia

=== Group B ===
The tournament was to be held in Asiago, Italy, from April 18 to 25, 2021.

- Austria
- Hungary
- Italy
- Poland
- Slovenia
- Ukraine

== Division II ==
=== Group A ===
The tournament was to be held in Tallinn, Estonia, from April 4 to 10, 2021.

- Great Britain
- Estonia
- Lithuania
- Romania
- Serbia
- South Korea

=== Group B ===
The tournament was to be held in Sofia, Bulgaria, from March 21 to 27, 2021,

- Australia
- Bulgaria
- China
- Croatia
- Netherlands
- Spain

== Division III ==
=== Group A ===
The tournament was to be held in Istanbul, Turkey, from March 29 to April 4, 2021.

- Belgium
- Chinese Taipei
- Iceland
- Israel
- Mexico
- Turkey

=== Group B ===
The tournament was to be held in Kockelscheuer, Luxembourg, from March 28 to April 3, 2021.

- Bosnia and Herzegovina
- Hong Kong
- Kyrgyzstan
- Luxembourg
- New Zealand
- South Africa
