= Noah Hasa =

Swedish ice hockey player (born 2003)

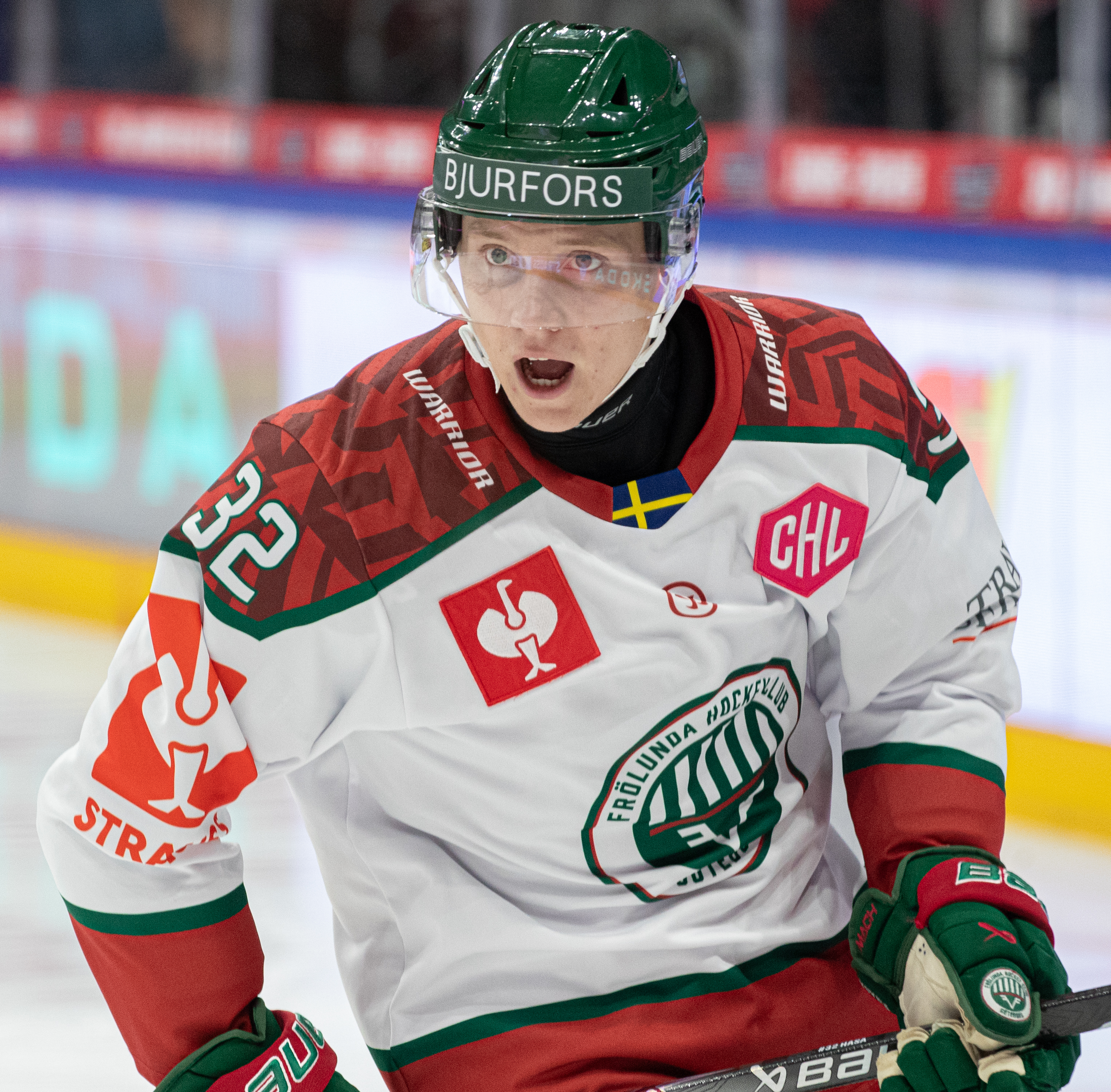
- Hasa in 2025
- Born: 6 March 2003 (age 22) Uppsala, Sweden
- Height: 180 cm (5 ft 11 in)
- Weight: 80 kg (176 lb; 12 st 8 lb)
- Position: Centre
- Shoots: Left
- SHL team: Frölunda HC
- Playing career: 2021–present

Noah Hasa (born 6 March 2003) is a Swedish professional ice hockey centre for Frölunda HC of the Swedish Hockey League (SHL).

== Playing career ==
He joined Frölunda's junior academy for the 2015–16 season. Hasa represented Gothenburg at TV-pucken in 2018, leading the team as captain to winning the tournament after having won 5–0 over Västerbotten in the final. He scored three goals and five assist for a total of eight points in six games. Hasa made his SHL debut during the 2021–22 season. During the 2022–23 season, Hasa was loaned to Västerviks IK in the Hockeyallsvenskan and before re-joining Frölunda for the SHL playoffs. During the 2023–24 season Hasa scored four goals and five assist for a total of nine points, establishing himself as regular on Frölunda's SHL roster.

== Personal life ==
Noah's older brother Filip also plays for Frölunda in the SHL.

== Career statistics ==
=== Regular season and playoffs ===
| | | | Regular season | | | | | Playoffs |
| Season | Team | League | GP | G | A | Pts | PIM | GP | G | A | Pts | PIM |
|---|---|---|---|---|---|---|---|---|---|---|---|---|
| 2019–20 | Frölunda HC | J20 | 5 | 0 | 0 | 0 | 0 | — | — | — | — | — |
| 2020–21 | Frölunda HC | J20 | 18 | 2 | 3 | 5 | 10 | — | — | — | — | — |
| 2021–22 | Frölunda HC | J20 | 32 | 17 | 21 | 38 | 14 | 3 | 0 | 2 | 2 | 2 |
| 2021–22 | Frölunda HC | SHL | 8 | 0 | 0 | 0 | 0 | — | — | — | — | — |
| 2022–23 | Västerviks IK | Allsv | 46 | 7 | 9 | 16 | 20 | 6 | 1 | 2 | 3 | 2 |
| 2022–23 | Frölunda HC | SHL | 1 | 0 | 0 | 0 | 0 | 6 | 0 | 1 | 1 | 0 |
| 2023–24 | Frölunda HC | SHL | 52 | 4 | 5 | 9 | 4 | 14 | 1 | 1 | 2 | 0 |
| 2024–25 | Frölunda HC | SHL | 43 | 5 | 5 | 10 | 12 | 12 | 2 | 3 | 5 | 2 |
| SHL totals | | | 104 | 9 | 10 | 19 | 16 | 32 | 3 | 5 | 8 | 2 |

=== International ===
| Year | Team | Event | Result | GP | G | A | Pts | PIM |
|---|---|---|---|---|---|---|---|---|
| 2021 | Sweden | U18 | 3rd place, bronze medalist(s) | 7 | 1 | 2 | 3 | 4 |
| Junior totals | | | | 7 | 1 | 2 | 3 | 4 |
