= Simon Robertsson =

Swedish ice hockey player (born 2003)

- Born: 5 February 2003 (age 23) Piteå, Sweden
- Height: 6 ft 0 in (183 cm)
- Weight: 190 lb (86 kg; 13 st 8 lb)
- Position: Left wing
- Shoots: Left
- NHL team (P) Cur. team Former teams: St. Louis Blues; Springfield Thunderbirds (AHL); Skellefteå AIK
- NHL draft: 71st overall, 2021; St. Louis Blues
- Playing career: 2020–present

Bert Erik Simon Robertsson (born 5 February 2003) is a Swedish professional ice hockey left winger for the Springfield Thunderbirds of the American Hockey League (AHL) while under contract to the St. Louis Blues of the National Hockey League (NHL). Robertsson was drafted by the Blues in the third round of the 2021 NHL entry draft with the 71st overall pick, after the Blues traded up to select him.

== Playing career ==
In the 2023–24 season, his fifth in the Swedish Hockey League (SHL), Robertsson contributed to Skellefteå AIK claiming the Swedish Championship, helping the team to their first title since 2014. On 1 May 2024, Robertsson was signed by draft club, the St. Louis Blues, to a three-year, entry-level contract.

== International play ==
Medal record

Representing Sweden

Ice hockey

World U18 Championships
| Bronze medal – third place | 2021 United States | |

Robertsson represented Sweden at the 2021 IIHF World U18 Championships and recorded three goals and one assist in seven games and won a bronze medal.

== Personal life ==
Robertsson is the son of the former ice hockey player Bert Robertsson.

== Career statistics ==
=== Regular season and playoffs ===
| | | | Regular season | | | | | Playoffs |
| Season | Team | League | GP | G | A | Pts | PIM | GP | G | A | Pts | PIM |
|---|---|---|---|---|---|---|---|---|---|---|---|---|
| 2018–19 | Skellefteå AIK | J20 | 4 | 1 | 1 | 2 | 4 | — | — | — | — | — |
| 2019–20 | Skellefteå AIK | J20 | 41 | 13 | 17 | 30 | 36 | — | — | — | — | — |
| 2019–20 | Skellefteå AIK | SHL | 8 | 1 | 0 | 1 | 0 | — | — | — | — | — |
| 2020–21 | Skellefteå AIK | J20 | 15 | 9 | 11 | 20 | 14 | — | — | — | — | — |
| 2020–21 | Skellefteå AIK | SHL | 22 | 1 | 1 | 2 | 0 | — | — | — | — | — |
| 2020–21 | Piteå HC | Div. 1 | 7 | 2 | 1 | 3 | 29 | 5 | 0 | 3 | 3 | 2 |
| 2021–22 | Skellefteå AIK | J20 | 21 | 14 | 9 | 23 | 28 | 2 | 0 | 1 | 1 | 4 |
| 2021–22 | Skellefteå AIK | SHL | 48 | 5 | 1 | 6 | 20 | 6 | 0 | 1 | 1 | 0 |
| 2022–23 | Skellefteå AIK | J20 | 2 | 1 | 2 | 3 | 2 | — | — | — | — | — |
| 2022–23 | Skellefteå AIK | SHL | 16 | 5 | 2 | 7 | 0 | 8 | 1 | 0 | 1 | 2 |
| 2022–23 | Piteå HC | Div. 1 | 1 | 0 | 1 | 1 | 0 | — | — | — | — | — |
| 2022–23 | Västerås IK | Allsv | 15 | 4 | 3 | 7 | 6 | 7 | 1 | 2 | 3 | 2 |
| 2023–24 | Skellefteå AIK | SHL | 27 | 2 | 2 | 4 | 12 | 15 | 1 | 1 | 2 | 28 |
| 2023–24 | Brynäs IF | Allsv | 12 | 6 | 3 | 9 | 2 | 3 | 1 | 1 | 2 | 2 |
| 2024–25 | Springfield Thunderbirds | AHL | 26 | 6 | 7 | 13 | 12 | — | — | — | — | — |
| 2025–26 | Springfield Thunderbirds | AHL | 40 | 2 | 5 | 7 | 21 | 3 | 0 | 0 | 0 | 2 |
| SHL totals | | | 121 | 14 | 6 | 20 | 32 | 29 | 2 | 2 | 4 | 30 |

=== International ===
| Year | Team | Event | Result | GP | G | A | Pts | PIM |
|---|---|---|---|---|---|---|---|---|
| 2021 | Sweden | U18 | 3rd place, bronze medalist(s) | 7 | 3 | 1 | 4 | 6 |
| 2023 | Sweden | WJC | 4th | 7 | 1 | 1 | 2 | 0 |
| Junior totals | | | | 14 | 4 | 2 | 6 | 6 |

== Awards and honors ==
| Award | Year |
|---|---|
SHL
| Le Mat Trophy (Skellefteå AIK) | 2024 |
