= Zachary L'Heureux =

Canadian ice hockey player (born 2003)

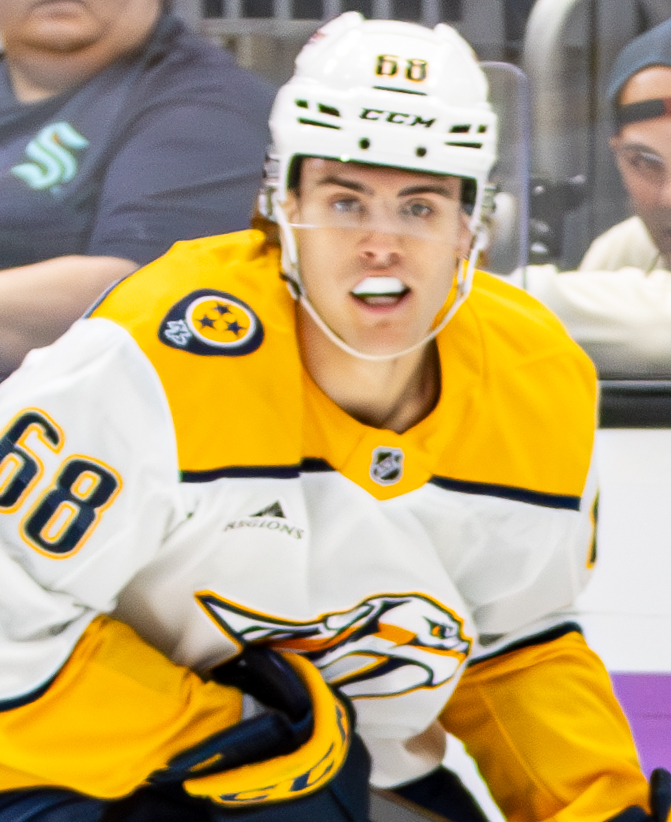
- L'Heureux with the Nashville Predators in 2024
- Born: May 15, 2003 (age 23) Montreal, Quebec, Canada
- Height: 5 ft 11 in (180 cm)
- Weight: 196 lb (89 kg; 14 st 0 lb)
- Position: Forward
- Shoots: Left
- NHL team Former teams: Colorado Avalanche; Nashville Predators
- NHL draft: 27th overall, 2021; Nashville Predators
- Playing career: 2023–present

Zachary L'Heureux (born May 15, 2003) is a Canadian professional ice hockey player who is a forward for the Colorado Avalanche of the National Hockey League (NHL).

== Playing career ==
L'Heureux was drafted by the Nashville Predators in the first round of the 2021 NHL entry draft with the 27th overall pick in the draft. According to L'Heureux, he models his playing style after agitators such as Brad Marchand and Matthew Tkachuk. On July 28, L'Heureux was signed to a three-year, entry-level contract with the Predators. On October 22, L'Heureux made his NHL debut. In a short period of time, L'Heureux quickly established himself as a fan favourite in Nashville.

On November 17, 2024, L'Heureux scored his first career NHL goal in a 5–3 win against the Vancouver Canucks.

On June 24, 2026, L'Heureux and Fedor Svechkov were traded to the Colorado Avalanche in exchange for Chase Bradley, Jack Drury and a 2029 third-round pick.

== Disciplinary history ==
L'Heureux has a history of disciplinary actions on multiple teams in the Quebec Major Junior Hockey League (QMJHL), American Hockey League (AHL), and NHL. One of his suspensions from the QMJHL was for an assault on a fan with a hockey stick, for which he was suspended 10 games. In 2023 he told a news outlet that he was working to avoid disciplinary action, but was later suspended twice in the following season by the AHL. Not including his 2025 suspension from the NHL, he had been suspended a total of 11 times, resulting in him missing 39 games.

== Career statistics ==
=== Regular season and playoffs ===
			Regular season					Playoffs
Season	Team	League	GP	G	A	Pts	PIM	GP	G	A	Pts	PIM
2019–20	Moncton Wildcats	QMJHL	55	20	33	53	70	—	—	—	—	—
2020–21	Halifax Mooseheads	QMJHL	33	19	20	39	47	—	—	—	—	—
2021–22	Halifax Mooseheads	QMJHL	46	22	34	56	64	—	—	—	—	—
2022–23	Halifax Mooseheads	QMJHL	33	21	21	42	34	20	11	15	26	43
2023–24	Milwaukee Admirals	AHL	66	19	29	48	197	15	10	5	15	62
2024–25	Milwaukee Admirals	AHL	4	3	2	5	4	—	—	—	—	—
2024–25	Nashville Predators	NHL	62	5	10	15	63	—	—	—	—	—
2025–26	Milwaukee Admirals	AHL	30	14	14	28	65	3	0	1	1	2
2025–26	Nashville Predators	NHL	25	4	1	5	21	—	—	—	—	—
NHL totals			87	9	11	20	84	—	—	—	—	—

=== International ===
Year	Team	Event	Result	GP	G	A	Pts	PIM
2019	Canada Black	U17	8th	5	0	3	3	6
Junior totals				5	0	3	3	6

Awards and achievements
Preceded by Fedor Svechkov	Nashville Predators first-round draft pick 2021	Succeeded by Joakim Kemell
