= Ethan Del Mastro =

Canadian ice hockey player (born 2003)

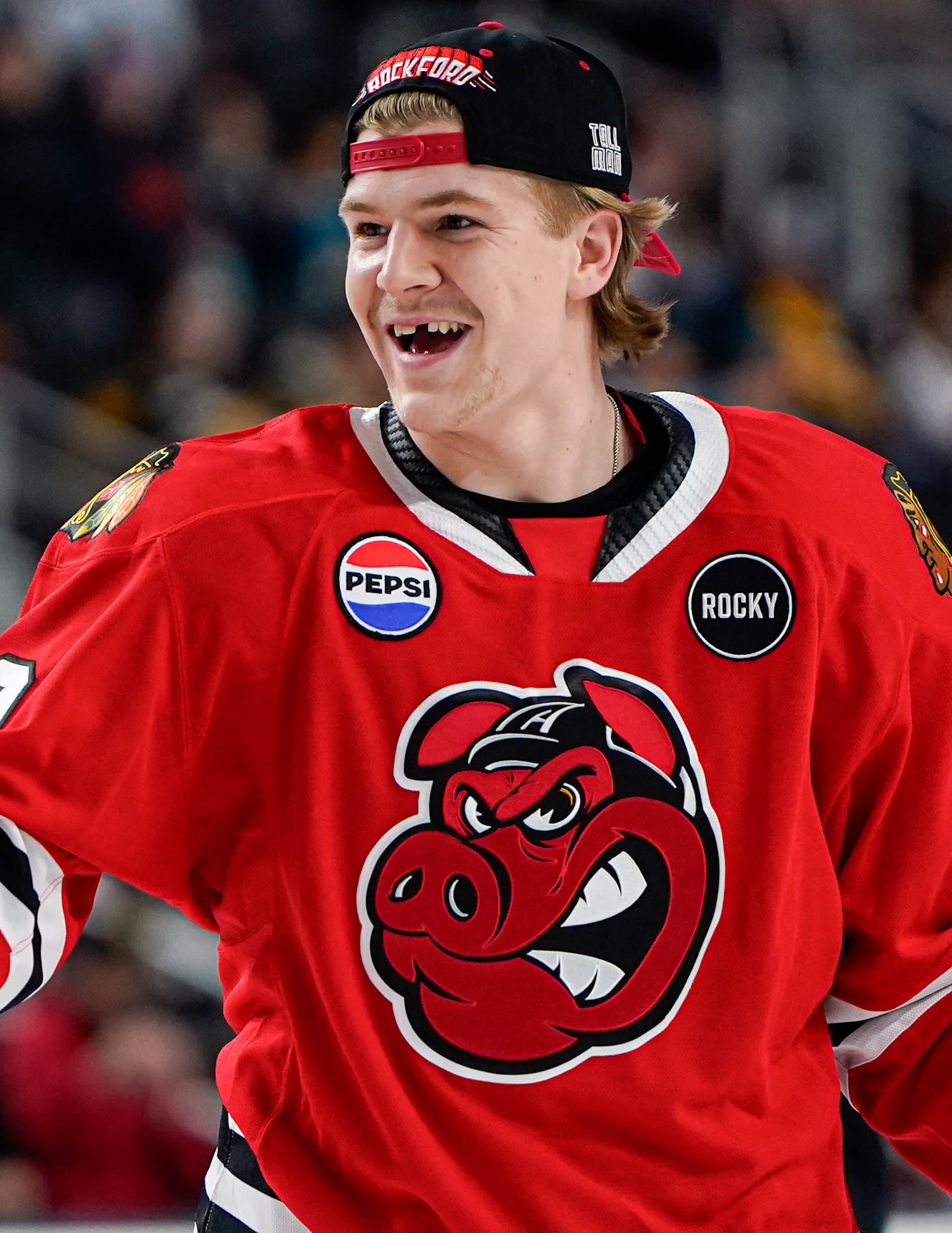
- Del Mastro with the Rockford IceHogs in 2024
- Born: January 15, 2003 (age 23) Burlington, Ontario, Canada
- Height: 6 ft 4 in (193 cm)
- Weight: 210 lb (95 kg; 15 st 0 lb)
- Position: Defence
- Shoots: Left
- NHL team: Chicago Blackhawks
- NHL draft: 105th overall, 2021; Chicago Blackhawks
- Playing career: 2023–present

Ethan Del Mastro (born January 15, 2003) is a Canadian professional ice hockey player who is a defenceman for the Chicago Blackhawks of the National Hockey League (NHL). He was drafted 105th overall by the Blackhawks in the 2021 NHL entry draft.

== Playing career ==
Del Mastro was drafted by the Blackhawks in the 4th round, 105th overall in the 2021 NHL entry draft. He signed a three-year entry-level contract with the team on April 22, 2022. Del Mastro would be Rockford's sole AHL All-Star during the season in his rookie campaign. At the tail end of the 2023–24 season, Del Mastro was called up from AHL affiliate, the Rockford IceHogs, on April 11, 2024. Del Mastro made his NHL debut with the Blackhawks on April 12, 2024, in a 5–1 defeat to the Nashville Predators. Following a two-game stint with the Blackhawks, Del Mastro returned to Rockford to play in the AHL playoffs. He would later be named the team's "rookie of the year."

== Career statistics ==
=== Regular season and playoffs ===
			Regular season					Playoffs
Season	Team	League	GP	G	A	Pts	PIM	GP	G	A	Pts	PIM
2018–19	Toronto Marlboros	GTHL	33	2	19	21	24	—	—	—	—	—
2019–20	Mississauga Steelheads	OHL	57	0	7	7	28	—	—	—	—	—
2021–22	Mississauga Steelheads	OHL	68	7	41	48	91	10	0	3	3	10
2022–23	Mississauga Steelheads	OHL	22	2	19	21	35	—	—	—	—	—
2022–23	Sarnia Sting	OHL	30	5	33	38	47	16	0	10	10	31
2023–24	Rockford IceHogs	AHL	69	7	30	37	54	4	1	1	2	0
2023–24	Chicago Blackhawks	NHL	2	0	0	0	0	—	—	—	—	—
2024–25	Rockford IceHogs	AHL	47	0	9	9	39	7	0	2	2	0
2024–25	Chicago Blackhawks	NHL	24	2	4	6	6	—	—	—	—	—
2025–26	Chicago Blackhawks	NHL	19	0	1	1	18	—	—	—	—	—
2025–26	Rockford IceHogs	AHL	45	2	16	18	34	—	—	—	—	—
NHL totals			45	2	5	7	24	—	—	—	—	—

Medal record

Representing Canada

Ice hockey

World Junior Championships
Gold medal – first place	2022 Canada	
Gold medal – first place	2023 Canada	

World U18 Championships
Gold medal – first place	2021 United States	

=== International ===
Year	Team	Event	Result	GP	G	A	Pts	PIM
2019	Canada Black	U17	8th	5	0	0	0	2
2021	Canada	U18	1st place, gold medalist(s)	7	0	2	2	8
2022	Canada	WJC	1st place, gold medalist(s)	6	0	0	0	2
2023	Canada	WJC	1st place, gold medalist(s)	7	0	3	3	8
Junior totals				25	0	5	5	20

== Awards and honours ==
Award	Year	Ref
OHL
Second All-Star Team	2023	
AHL
All-Star Game	2024	
