= Nikita Chibrikov =

Russian ice hockey player (born 2003)

- Born: February 16, 2003 (age 23) Moscow, Russia
- Height: 5 ft 10 in (178 cm)
- Weight: 172 lb (78 kg; 12 st 4 lb)
- Position: Right wing
- Shoots: Left
- NHL team (P) Cur. team Former teams: Winnipeg Jets; Manitoba Moose (AHL); SKA Saint Petersburg; Spartak Moscow
- NHL draft: 50th overall, 2021; Winnipeg Jets
- Playing career: 2020–present

Nikita Dmitrovich Chibrikov (Russian: Никита Дмитриевич Чибриков; born 16 February 2003) is a Russian professional ice hockey winger who plays for the Manitoba Moose in the American Hockey League (AHL) as a prospect under contract to the Winnipeg Jets of the National Hockey League (NHL). He was selected by the Winnipeg Jets in the second round, 50th overall, of the 2021 NHL entry draft.

== Playing career ==
On 31 July 2022, Chibrikov was among 9 players traded by SKA Saint Petersburg to Spartak Moscow in exchange for Alexander Nikishin.

Following completion of the 2022–23 season, his third year in the KHL, Chibrikov was signed to a three-year, entry-level contract by the Winnipeg Jets on 1 May 2023. He was immediately assigned to join the AHL affiliate, the Manitoba Moose, for the remainder of their playoff run.

Drafted 50th overall in the 2021 NHL Entry Draft, the Russian winger began his North American career with the AHL’s Manitoba Moose, where he recorded 65 points (24 goals, 41 assists) in 100 games over two seasons.

Chibrikov made his NHL debut during the 2023–24 season, scoring a goal in his first game. He followed that with two goals and one assist in four games during the 2024–25 season, becoming the first player in Jets franchise history to score in each of his first three NHL games. His momentum was halted by a season-ending injury while playing for the Moose, but he returned healthy for the 2025–26 season and signed a two-year contract extension with an average annual value of $875,000.

Due to injuries to key forwards like Cole Perfetti and Adam Lowry, Chibrikov was given a top-six role to start the 2025–26 season, skating alongside veterans Jonathan Toews and Gustav Nyquist.

== Career statistics ==
=== Regular season and playoffs ===
| | | | Regular season | | | | | Playoffs |
| Season | Team | League | GP | G | A | Pts | PIM | GP | G | A | Pts | PIM |
|---|---|---|---|---|---|---|---|---|---|---|---|---|
| 2019–20 | MHC Dynamo Moscow | MHL | 32 | 3 | 13 | 16 | 8 | 3 | 0 | 1 | 1 | 4 |
| 2020–21 | SKA-1946 | MHL | 11 | 3 | 6 | 9 | 12 | 5 | 0 | 3 | 3 | 2 |
| 2020–21 | SKA Saint Petersburg | KHL | 16 | 1 | 1 | 2 | 6 | — | — | — | — | — |
| 2020–21 | SKA-Neva | VHL | 20 | 3 | 5 | 8 | 49 | — | — | — | — | — |
| 2020–21 | SKA-1946 | MHL | 10 | 3 | 11 | 14 | 6 | — | — | — | — | — |
| 2021–22 | SKA Saint Petersburg | KHL | 4 | 0 | 0 | 0 | 0 | — | — | — | — | — |
| 2021–22 | SKA-Neva | VHL | 28 | 15 | 16 | 31 | 10 | 17 | 4 | 6 | 10 | 12 |
| 2021–22 | SKA-1946 | MHL | 4 | 4 | 2 | 6 | 8 | 7 | 3 | 5 | 8 | 29 |
| 2022–23 | Spartak Moscow | KHL | 31 | 1 | 1 | 2 | 8 | — | — | — | — | — |
| 2022–23 | Khimik Voskresensk | VHL | 16 | 3 | 7 | 10 | 4 | 2 | 0 | 0 | 0 | 0 |
| 2022–23 | MHK Spartak Moscow | MHL | 12 | 8 | 10 | 18 | 2 | 7 | 5 | 5 | 10 | 10 |
| 2023–24 | Manitoba Moose | AHL | 70 | 17 | 30 | 47 | 53 | 2 | 1 | 0 | 1 | 0 |
| 2023–24 | Winnipeg Jets | NHL | 1 | 1 | 0 | 1 | 0 | — | — | — | — | — |
| 2024–25 | Manitoba Moose | AHL | 30 | 7 | 11 | 18 | 10 | — | — | — | — | — |
| 2024–25 | Winnipeg Jets | NHL | 4 | 2 | 1 | 3 | 0 | — | — | — | — | — |
| 2025–26 | Manitoba Moose | AHL | 53 | 6 | 10 | 16 | 28 | — | — | — | — | — |
| 2025–26 | Winnipeg Jets | NHL | 11 | 0 | 0 | 0 | 14 | — | — | — | — | — |
| KHL totals | | | 51 | 2 | 2 | 4 | 14 | — | — | — | — | — |
| NHL totals | | | 16 | 3 | 1 | 4 | 14 | — | — | — | — | — |

=== International ===
| Year | Team | Event | Result | GP | G | A | Pts | PIM |
|---|---|---|---|---|---|---|---|---|
| 2019 | Russia | U17 | 1st place, gold medalist(s) | 6 | 3 | 5 | 8 | 0 |
| 2021 | Russia | U18 | 2nd place, silver medalist(s) | 7 | 4 | 9 | 13 | 14 |
| Junior totals | | | | 13 | 7 | 14 | 21 | 14 |
