= Aleksi Malinen =

Finnish ice hockey player (born 2003)

- Born: 26 May 2003 (age 23) Tuusula, Finland
- Height: 6 ft 0 in (183 cm)
- Weight: 176 lb (80 kg; 12 st 8 lb)
- Position: Defense
- Shot: Left
- Liiga team: JYP
- NHL draft: 189th overall, 2021; New York Islanders
- Playing career: 2020–2024

Aleksi Malinen (born 26 May 2003) is a Finnish former professional ice hockey defenseman who plays for JYP Jyväskylä in Liiga. He was selected 189th overall in the 2021 NHL entry draft by the New York Islanders.

== Playing career ==
Malinen played 30 games in Liiga with JYP during the 2020–21 season. He would subsequently be selected 189th overall in the 2021 NHL entry draft by the New York Islanders.

== Career statistics ==
=== Regular season and playoffs ===
			Regular season					Playoffs
Season	Team	League	GP	G	A	Pts	PIM	GP	G	A	Pts	PIM
2019–20	JYP	Jr. A	49	1	9	10	6	—	—	—	—	—
2020–21	JYP	Liiga	30	2	1	3	10	—	—	—	—	—
2020–21	JYP	Jr. A	—	—	—	—	—	3	0	1	1	0
2021–22	JYP	Jr. A	33	3	14	17	20	—	—	—	—	—
2021–22	JYP	Liiga	6	0	0	0	0	—	—	—	—	—
2021–22	KeuPa HT	Mestis	2	0	0	0	0	—	—	—	—	—
2022–23	JYP	Jr. A	5	1	2	3	2	—	—	—	—	—
2022–23	JYP	Liiga	42	0	7	7	2	—	—	—	—	—
2022–23	KeuPa HT	Mestis	3	1	1	2	4	—	—	—	—	—
2023–24	JYP	Liiga	15	0	2	2	0	—	—	—	—	—
Liiga totals			93	2	10	12	12	—	—	—	—	—

=== International ===
Year	Team	Event	Result	GP	G	A	Pts	PIM
2019	Finland	U17	7th	5	0	0	0	0
2021	Finland	U18	4th	7	1	0	1	0
2023	Finland	WJC	5th	5	0	1	1	2
Junior totals				17	1	1	2	2
