= Carl Lindbom (ice hockey) =

Swedish ice hockey player (born 2003)

- Born: 20 May 2003 (age 23) Stockholm, Sweden
- Height: 6 ft 1 in (185 cm)
- Weight: 190 lb (86 kg; 13 st 8 lb)
- Position: Goaltender
- Catches: Left
- NHL team (P) Cur. team Former teams: Vegas Golden Knights; Henderson Silver Knights (AHL); Djurgårdens IF; Färjestad BK
- NHL draft: 222nd overall, 2021; Vegas Golden Knights
- Playing career: 2022–present

Carl Lindbom (born 20 May 2003) is a Swedish professional ice hockey goaltender for the Henderson Silver Knights of the American Hockey League (AHL) as a prospect to the Vegas Golden Knights of the National Hockey League (NHL). Lindbom was selected in the seventh round, 222nd overall, by the Golden Knights in the 2021 NHL entry draft.

== Playing career ==
Lindbom played as a youth within Djurgårdens IF organization before making his professional debut in the SHL in the 2021–22 season. He was subsequently drafted in the 7th round of the 2021 NHL entry draft by the Vegas Golden Knights.

After earning the starting goaltending role for Djurgårdens IF in the HockeyAllsvenskan in the 2022–23 season, Lindbom was signed to a three-year, entry-level contract with draft club, the Vegas Golden Knights, on 1 June 2023. The following day he was loaned by the Golden Knights to SHL club, Färjestad BK, for the 2023–24 season. Lindbom then spent the 2024–25 season with Vegas' American Hockey League (AHL) affiliate, the Henderson Silver Knights.

Following an injury to starting goaltender Adin Hill early in the 2025–26 season, Vegas recalled Lindbom to the National Hockey League (NHL) for the first time in his career on 22 October 2025. Lindbom made his NHL debut for Vegas on 26 October, stopping 26 of 28 shots in a 2–1 overtime loss to the Tampa Bay Lightning. On 29 November, Lindbom recorded his first NHL win, stopping 18 of 21 shots faced in a 4–3 victory over the San Jose Sharks. One day later, Lindbom was sent back down to the AHL, as the team recalled fellow goaltender Carter Hart in a corresponding move.

As a restricted free agent, Lindbom signed a three-year extension with Vegas on June 28, 2026.

== Career statistics ==
=== Regular season and playoffs ===
Medal record

Representing Sweden

Ice hockey

World U18 Championship
Bronze medal – third place	2021 United States	

World Junior Championships
Bronze medal – third place	2022 Canada	

			Regular season									Playoffs
Season	Team	League	GP	W	L	T/OT	MIN	GA	SO	GAA	SV%	GP	W	L	MIN	GA	SO	GAA	SV%
2019–20	Djurgårdens IF	J18	10	9	1	0	598	17	3	1.71	.936	—	—	—	—	—	—	—	—
2020–21	Djurgårdens IF	J20	8	3	4	0	457	23	0	3.02	.890	—	—	—	—	—	—	—	—
2021–22	Djurgårdens IF	J20	19	13	6	0	1152	43	2	2.24	.913	2	1	1	118	6	0	3.07	.887
2021–22	Djurgårdens IF	SHL	1	0	0	0	40	1	0	1.50	.950	—	—	—	—	—	—	—	—
2021–22	Västerviks IK	HA	7	5	2	0	422	16	0	2.27	.913	5	2	2	219	14	0	3.84	.875
2022–23	Djurgårdens IF	HA	36	25	11	0	2167	67	7	1.86	.930	5	4	0	271	6	1	1.33	.941
2023–24	Färjestad BK	SHL	26	17	7	0	1469	52	2	2.12	.911	4	0	4	273	12	0	2.65	.905
2024–25	Henderson Silver Knights	AHL	36	18	15	3	2103	93	3	2.65	.912	—	—	—	—	—	—	—	—
2025–26	Henderson Silver Knights	AHL	35	24	5	8	2056	74	3	2.16	.926	6	3	3	375	16	0	2.56	.913
2025–26	Vegas Golden Knights	NHL	8	2	4	2	481	24	0	3.00	.873	—	—	—	—	—	—	—	—
SHL totals			27	17	7	0	1509	53	2	2.11	.913	4	0	4	273	12	0	2.65	.905
NHL totals			8	2	4	2	481	24	0	3.00	.873	—	—	—	—	—	—	—	—

=== International ===
Year	Team	Event	Result	GP	W	L	T/OT	MIN	GA	SO	GAA	SV%
2019	Sweden	U17	6th	4	2	2	0	192	15	0	4.71	.891
2021	Sweden	U18	3rd place, bronze medalist(s)	6	4	2	0	314	16	1	3.06	.918
2022	Sweden	WJC	3rd place, bronze medalist(s)	DNP
2023	Sweden	WJC	4th	7	4	3	0	432	19	2	2.64	.914
Junior totals				17	10	7	0	938	50	3	3.20	.909

== Awards and honors ==
Award	Year
HockeyAllsvenskan
Guldgallret (Best Junior)	2023
Goalie of the Year	2023
Rookie of the Year	2023
AHL
All-Star Game	2026
Second All-Star Team	2026
