= Fedor Svechkov =

Russian ice hockey player (born 2003)

- Born: 5 April 2003 (age 23) Tolyatti, Russia
- Height: 6 ft 0 in (183 cm)
- Weight: 187 lb (85 kg; 13 st 5 lb)
- Position: Centre
- Shoots: Left
- NHL team Former teams: Colorado Avalanche; SKA Saint Petersburg; Spartak Moscow; Nashville Predators
- NHL draft: 19th overall, 2021; Nashville Predators
- Playing career: 2020–present

Fedor Alexandrovich Svechkov (Russian: Фёдор Александрович Свечков; born 5 April 2003) is a Russian professional ice hockey player who is a centre for the Colorado Avalanche of the National Hockey League (NHL). He was selected by the Nashville Predators in the first round, 19th overall, of the 2021 NHL entry draft.

== Playing career ==
Svechkov played as a youth with hometown club, HC Lada Togliatti in the Junior Hockey League (MHL). Demonstrating a high-skill set offensively, Svechkov made his professional debut with Lada Togliatti in the 2020–21 season, in the second tier Supreme Hockey League (VHL). He contributed with 5 goals and 15 points in 38 regular season games while also splitting the season in the MHL, posting a point-per-game pace through 15 appearances.

On 10 May 2021, in order to play at the top level to continue his development, Svechkov was traded by Lada Togliatti to contending KHL club, SKA Saint Petersburg in exchange for financial compensation.

Svechkov was the sixth-rated European skater in NHL Central Scouting's pre-draft rankings and following his selection in the first-round, 19th overall, in the 2021 NHL entry draft by the Nashville Predators, he became the second consecutive Russian-born player selected in the first round by the Predators after the team picked teammate Yaroslav Askarov at No. 11 overall in 2020.

On 31 July 2022, Svechkov was among 9 players traded by SKA Saint Petersburg to Spartak Moscow in exchange for Alexander Nikishin.

Following a lone season within Spartak Moscow in 2022–23, Svechkov having concluded his KHL contract was signed to a three-year, entry-level contract with the Nashville Predators on 5 May 2023. He scored his first career NHL goal on 30 November 2024 during a 3–2 overtime loss against the Minnesota Wild.

On 24 June 2026, Svechkov and Zachary L'Heureux were traded to the Colorado Avalanche in exchange for Chase Bradley, Jack Drury and a 2029 third-round pick. He scored his first goal with the Avalanche during a game against the Winnipeg Jets on October 7, 2026.

== International play ==
Medal record

Men's ice hockey

Representing Russia

World U18 Championships
Silver medal – second place	2021 United States	

Internationally, Svechkov played for Russia at 2021 IIHF World U18 Championships, winning a silver medal. Playing at center in the tournament, Svechkov was fourth in team scoring with 10 points through 7 contests.

== Career statistics ==
=== Regular season and playoffs ===
			Regular season					Playoffs
Season	Team	League	GP	G	A	Pts	PIM	GP	G	A	Pts	PIM
2019–20	Ladia Togliatti	MHL	24	4	2	6	6	—	—	—	—	—
2020–21	Lada Togliatti	VHL	38	5	10	15	6	—	—	—	—	—
2020–21	Ladia Togliatti	MHL	15	4	11	15	35	—	—	—	—	—
2021–22	SKA Saint Petersburg	KHL	4	0	0	0	0	—	—	—	—	—
2021–22	SKA-Neva	VHL	30	9	22	31	12	13	3	3	6	4
2021–22	SKA-1946	MHL	4	0	8	8	0	7	3	2	5	0
2022–23	Spartak Moscow	KHL	27	2	2	4	5	—	—	—	—	—
2022–23	Khimik Voskresensk	VHL	14	1	6	7	0	9	5	2	7	6
2022–23	MHK Spartak Moscow	MHL	5	4	4	8	0	7	1	3	4	2
2023–24	Milwaukee Admirals	AHL	57	16	23	39	18	15	6	6	12	4
2024–25	Milwaukee Admirals	AHL	13	5	7	12	10	—	—	—	—	—
2024–25	Nashville Predators	NHL	52	8	9	17	14	—	—	—	—	—
2025–26	Nashville Predators	NHL	70	4	13	17	22	—	—	—	—	—
2025–26	Milwaukee Admirals	AHL	10	5	3	8	4	—	—	—	—	—
KHL totals			31	2	2	4	5	—	—	—	—	—
NHL totals			122	12	22	34	36	—	—	—	—	—

=== International ===
Year	Team	Event	Result	GP	G	A	Pts	PIM
2019	Russia	U17	1st place, gold medalist(s)	6	6	2	8	0
2021	Russia	U18	2nd place, silver medalist(s)	7	4	6	10	4
Junior totals				13	10	8	18	4

Awards and achievements
Preceded by Yaroslav Askarov	Nashville Predators first-round draft pick 2021	Succeeded by Zachary L'Heureux
