= Nikita Novikov (ice hockey) =

Russian ice hockey player (born 2003)

- Born: 25 July 2003 (age 23) Moscow, Russia
- Height: 6 ft 4 in (193 cm)
- Weight: 207 lb (94 kg; 14 st 11 lb)
- Position: Defence
- Shoots: Left
- KHL team: Dynamo Moscow
- NHL draft: 188th overall, 2021; Buffalo Sabres
- Playing career: 2021–present

Nikita Vadimovich Novikov (Russian: Никита Вадимович Новиков; born 25 July 2003) is a Russian professional ice hockey defenceman who is currently on trial with HC Dynamo Moscow of the Kontinental Hockey League (KHL).

== Playing career ==
Novikov was drafted in the sixth round, 188th overall, by the Buffalo Sabres in the 2021 NHL entry draft. He made his professional debut for Dynamo Moscow in the Kontinental Hockey League (KHL) during the 2021–22 season.

Following his second season in the KHL in 2022–23, having appeared in a career high 62 regular season games and recording 5 points from the blueline, Novikov was signed to a three-year, entry-level contract with the Buffalo Sabres on 19 May 2023.

During the 2025–26 season, in his third season with the Sabres affiliate, the Rochester Americans, having registered 6 goals and 18 points through 50 appearances, Novikov was loaned by the Sabres to the Ontario Reign of the AHL for the remainder of the season on 9 March 2026.

Leaving the Sabres organization as a free agent following the conclusion of his entry-level contract, Novikov returned to Russia, initially re-joining his original club, Dyanmo Moscow on trial, on 22 July 2026.

== International play ==
Novikov represented Russia at the 2021 IIHF World U18 Championships where he recorded five assists in seven games and won a silver medal. He played for Russia at the 2022 World Junior Ice Hockey Championships.

== Career statistics ==
=== Regular season and playoffs ===
			Regular season					Playoffs
Season	Team	League	GP	G	A	Pts	PIM	GP	G	A	Pts	PIM
2019–20	MHC Dynamo Moscow	MHL	35	4	7	11	24	4	0	0	0	4
2020–21	MHC Dynamo Moscow	MHL	52	4	10	14	61	4	0	0	0	2
2021–22	MHC Dynamo Moscow	MHL	6	1	3	4	0	—	—	—	—	—
2021–22	Dynamo Moscow	KHL	32	1	3	4	6	9	0	1	1	0
2022–23	Dynamo Moscow	KHL	62	2	3	5	14	6	0	0	0	0
2023–24	Rochester Americans	AHL	65	3	20	23	42	5	0	2	2	0
2024–25	Rochester Americans	AHL	68	6	14	20	52	8	0	2	2	4
2025–26	Rochester Americans	AHL	50	6	12	18	44	—	—	—	—	—
2025–26	Ontario Reign	AHL	14	0	2	2	8	5	0	0	0	2
KHL totals			94	3	6	9	20	15	0	1	1	0

=== International ===
Year	Team	Event	Result	GP	G	A	Pts	PIM
2021	Russia	U18	2nd place, silver medalist(s)	7	0	5	5	4
Junior totals				7	0	5	5	4
