= Danila Yurov =

Russian ice hockey player (born 2003)

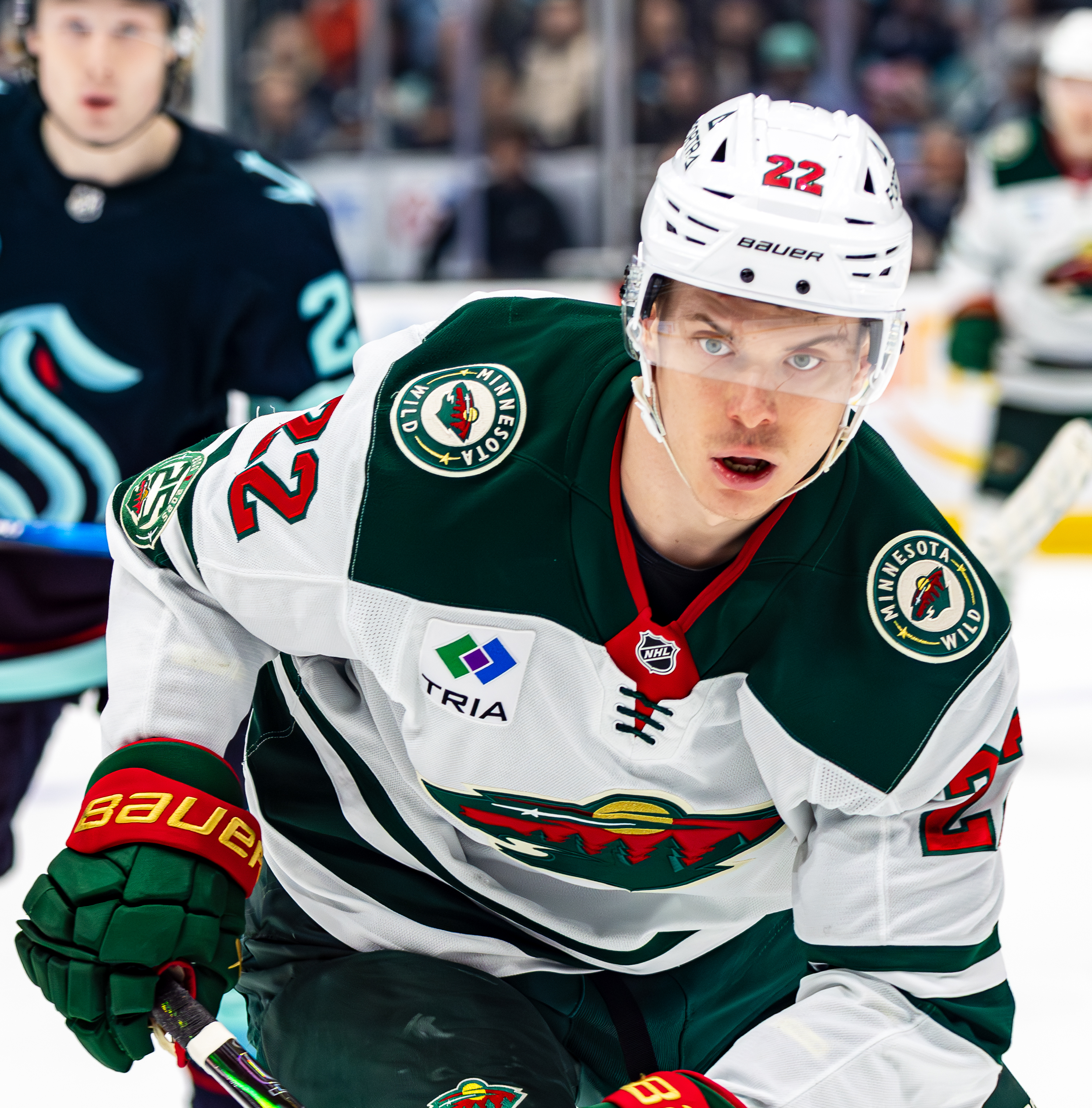
- Yurov playing for the Minnesota Wild in 2026
- Born: 22 December 2003 (age 22) Chelyabinsk, Russia
- Height: 6 ft 1 in (185 cm)
- Weight: 178 lb (81 kg; 12 st 10 lb)
- Position: Centre
- Shoots: Left
- NHL team Former teams: Minnesota Wild; Metallurg Magnitogorsk
- NHL draft: 24th overall, 2022; Minnesota Wild
- Playing career: 2021–present

Danila Yurevich Yurov (Russian: Данила Юрьевич Юров; born 22 December 2003) is a Russian professional ice hockey player who is a centre for the Minnesota Wild of the National Hockey League (NHL). He was drafted 24th overall by the Wild in the 2022 NHL entry draft. Yurov won the 2024 Gagarin Cup Championship with Metallurg Magnitogorsk of the Kontinental Hockey League (KHL).

== Playing career ==
Yurov made his professional debut for Metallurg Magnitogorsk during the 2020–21 season where he recorded one goal and one assist in 21 games.

At the conclusion of his contract with Metallurg following the 2024–25 season, Yurov was signed by his draft club, the Minnesota Wild to a three-year, entry-level contract on 16 May 2025. Yurov made his NHL debut against the Los Angeles Kings on 13 October 2025. He scored his first point and first goal against the New York Rangers on 20 October, which stood as the game-winning goal. He scored his first playoff goal during Game 4 of the Wild's second round series against the Colorado Avalanche on May 11, 2026 during the 2026 Stanley Cup playoffs.

== International play ==
Yurov represented Russia at the 2021 IIHF World U18 Championships where he recorded four goals and seven assists in seven games and won a silver medal. He was slated to represent Russia at the 2022 World Junior Ice Hockey Championships until Russia was suspended from all IIHF events as a result of the invasion of Ukraine.

== Career statistics ==
=== Regular season and playoffs ===
			Regular season					Playoffs
Season	Team	League	GP	G	A	Pts	PIM	GP	G	A	Pts	PIM
2019–20	Stalnye Lisy	MHL	18	6	7	13	6	5	0	0	0	0
2020–21	Stalnye Lisy	MHL	23	13	12	25	8	3	2	1	3	2
2020–21	Metallurg Magnitogorsk	KHL	21	1	1	2	0	3	1	0	1	0
2021–22	Stalnye Lisy	MHL	23	13	23	36	8	2	1	0	1	0
2021–22	Metallurg Magnitogorsk	KHL	21	0	0	0	2	19	0	0	0	0
2022–23	Stalnye Lisy	MHL	12	4	11	15	6	—	—	—	—	—
2022–23	Metallurg Magnitogorsk	KHL	59	6	6	12	8	11	0	0	0	2
2023–24	Metallurg Magnitogorsk	KHL	62	21	28	49	35	23	6	3	9	12
2024–25	Metallurg Magnitogorsk	KHL	46	13	12	25	10	5	1	0	1	0
2025–26	Minnesota Wild	NHL	73	12	15	27	28	9	1	2	3	8
KHL totals			209	41	47	88	55	61	8	3	11	14
NHL totals			73	12	15	27	28	9	1	2	3	8

=== International ===
Year	Team	Event	Result	GP	G	A	Pts	PIM
2019	Russia	U17	1st place, gold medalist(s)	6	2	6	8	0
2021	Russia	U18	2nd place, silver medalist(s)	7	4	7	11	2
Junior totals				13	6	13	19	2

== Awards and honours ==
Award	Year	Ref
KHL
Gagarin Cup champion	2024	

Awards and achievements
Preceded by Liam Öhgren	Minnesota Wild first-round draft pick 2022	Succeeded by Charlie Stramel
