= Corson Ceulemans =

Canadian ice hockey player (born 2003)

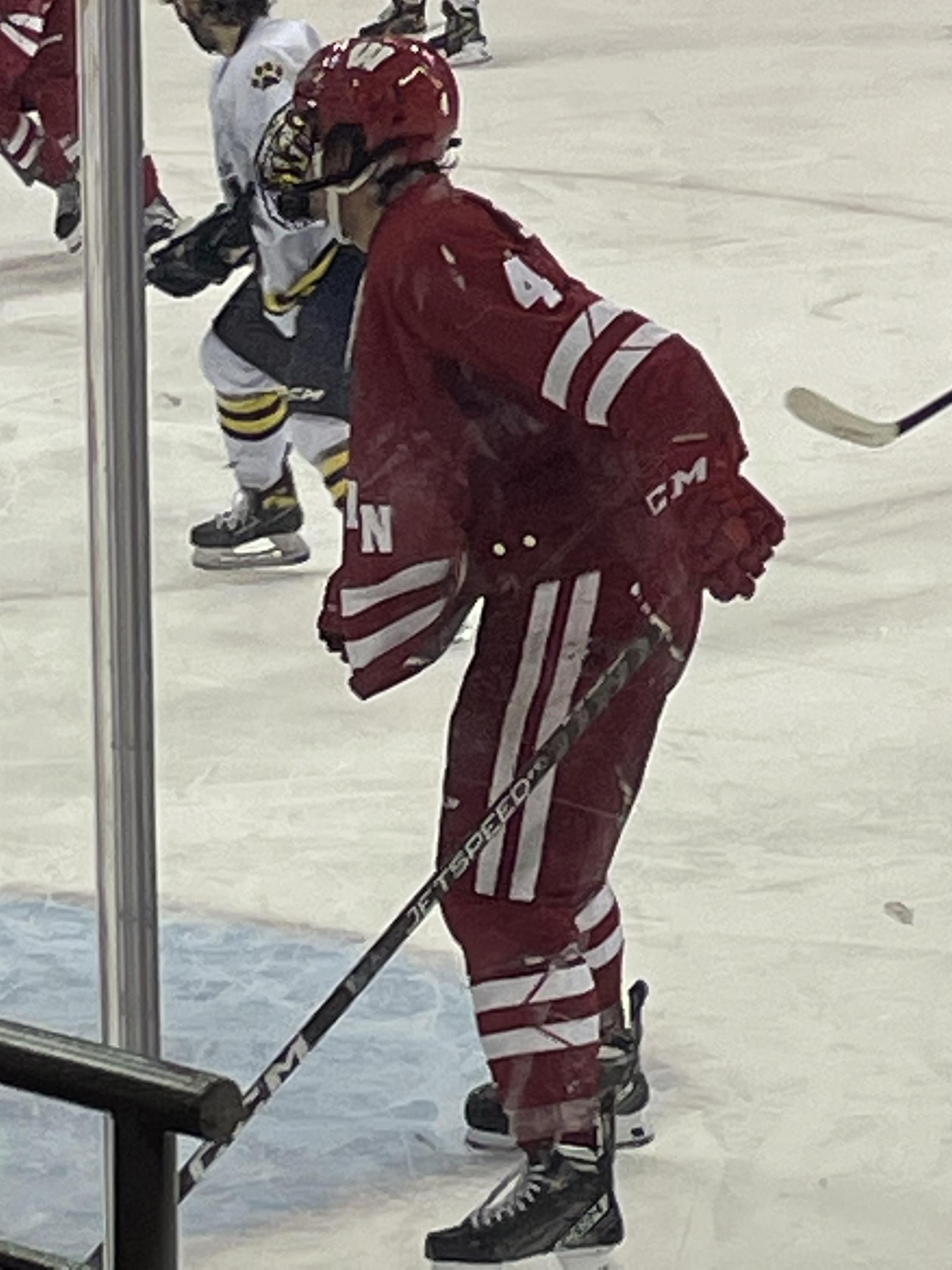
- Ceulemans playing for the Wisconsin Badgers in October 2022
- Born: May 5, 2003 (age 23) Regina, Saskatchewan, Canada
- Height: 6 ft 2 in (188 cm)
- Weight: 198 lb (90 kg; 14 st 2 lb)
- Position: Defence
- Shoots: Right
- NHL team (P) Cur. team: Columbus Blue Jackets; Cleveland Monsters (AHL)
- NHL draft: 25th overall, 2021; Columbus Blue Jackets
- Playing career: 2023–present

Corson Ceulemans (born May 5, 2003) is a Canadian professional ice hockey defenceman who plays for the Cleveland Monsters in the American Hockey League (AHL) as a prospect under contract to the Columbus Blue Jackets of the National Hockey League (NHL). Ceulemans was selected in the first round of the 2021 NHL entry draft by the Blue Jackets with the 25th overall selection.

== Playing career ==
As a junior Ceulemans played in the Alberta Junior Hockey League (AJHL) with the Brooks Bandits. He committed to a collegiate career with the University of Wisconsin of the Big Ten Conference (B1G).

Following his selection in the 2021 NHL entry draft in the first-round by the Blue Jackets, Ceulemans joined the Badgers as a freshman in the 2021–22 season. He collected 7 goals and 22 points in 34 appearances. He captured the team's Mark Johnson Rookie of the Year Award after leading the team in assists and points.

In the 2022–23 season, his sophomore year with the Badgers, Ceulemans recorded 8 goals and 15 assists for 23 points in 33 contests, leading the team on the blueline in scoring.

At the conclusion of Wisconsin's season, Ceulemans opted to conclude his collegiate career and was signed to a three-year, entry-level contract by the Columbus Blue Jackets on March 7, 2023. With the contract to start in the following season, Ceuleman was immediately signed to a tryout contract in joining AHL affiliate, the Cleveland Monsters, for the remainder of their 2022–23 campaign.

== Career statistics ==
=== Regular season and playoffs ===
			Regular season					Playoffs
Season	Team	League	GP	G	A	Pts	PIM	GP	G	A	Pts	PIM
2018–19	Brooks Bandits	AJHL	5	0	0	0	8	3	2	0	2	0
2019–20	Brooks Bandits	AJHL	44	5	30	35	80	—	—	—	—	—
2020–21	Brooks Bandits	AJHL	8	4	7	11	8	—	—	—	—	—
2021–22	U. of Wisconsin	B1G	34	7	15	22	33	—	—	—	—	—
2022–23	U. of Wisconsin	B1G	33	8	15	23	38	—	—	—	—	—
2022–23	Cleveland Monsters	AHL	13	1	1	2	6	—	—	—	—	—
2023–24	Cleveland Monsters	AHL	47	3	9	12	12	—	—	—	—	—
2024–25	Cleveland Monsters	AHL	33	2	5	7	29	—	—	—	—	—
2025–26	Cleveland Monsters	AHL	64	8	16	24	43	9	1	2	3	4
AHL totals			157	14	31	45	90	9	1	2	3	4

=== International ===
Year	Team	Event	Result	GP	G	A	Pts	PIM
2019	Canada Black	U17	8th	4	0	4	4	2
2021	Canada	U18	1st place, gold medalist(s)	6	1	7	8	6
Junior totals				10	1	11	12	8

Awards and achievements
Preceded by Cole Sillinger	Columbus Blue Jackets first-round draft pick 2021	Succeeded by David Jiříček
