= Prokhor Poltapov =

Russian ice hockey player (born 2003)

- Born: 1 February 2003 (age 23) St. Petersburg, Russia
- Height: 5 ft 11 in (180 cm)
- Weight: 172 lb (78 kg; 12 st 4 lb)
- Position: Winger
- Shoots: Left
- KHL team: CSKA Moscow
- NHL draft: 33rd overall, 2021; Buffalo Sabres
- Playing career: 2020–present

Prokhor Sergeyevich Poltapov (Russian: Прохор Сергеевич Полтапов; born 1 February 2003) is a Russian ice hockey right wing who plays for HC CSKA Moscow in the Kontinental Hockey League (KHL). He made his KHL debut for CSKA Moscow during the 2020–21 season. Poltapov was drafted by the Buffalo Sabres of the National Hockey League as the first pick of the second round of the 2021 NHL entry draft.

== Career statistics ==
=== Regular season and playoffs ===
			Regular season					Playoffs
Season	Team	League	GP	G	A	Pts	PIM	GP	G	A	Pts	PIM
2019–20	Krasnaya Armiya	MHL	23	8	4	12	10	2	0	0	0	2
2020–21	Krasnaya Armiya	MHL	61	25	27	52	30	6	2	1	3	6
2020–21	CSKA Moscow	KHL	1	0	0	0	0	—	—	—	—	—
2021–22	Krasnaya Armiya	MHL	13	5	10	15	6	19	7	11	18	29
2021–22	CSKA Moscow	KHL	17	0	0	0	0	—	—	—	—	—
2021–22	Zvezda Moscow	VHL	25	3	4	7	8	—	—	—	—	—
2022–23	CSKA Moscow	KHL	56	5	5	10	37	19	2	3	5	6
2022–23	Zvezda Moscow	VHL	3	0	1	1	2	—	—	—	—	—
2022–23	Krasnaya Armiya	MHL	2	1	0	1	2	1	0	0	0	0
2023–24	CSKA Moscow	KHL	56	5	8	13	12	5	0	1	1	0
2023–24	Zvezda Moscow	VHL	5	5	2	7	6	1	0	0	0	0
2024–25	CSKA Moscow	KHL	68	17	23	40	18	6	1	2	3	0
2025–26	CSKA Moscow	KHL	68	16	24	40	28	10	2	4	6	4
KHL totals			266	43	60	103	95	40	5	10	15	10

=== International ===
Year	Team	Event	Result	GP	G	A	Pts	PIM
2019	Russia	U17	1st place, gold medalist(s)	6	3	4	7	4
2021	Russia	U18	2nd place, silver medalist(s)	7	2	5	7	6
Junior totals				13	5	9	14	10

== Awards and honors ==
Award	Year
KHL
Gagarin Cup (CSKA Moscow)	2023
