= Samu Tuomaala =

Finnish ice hockey player (born 2003)

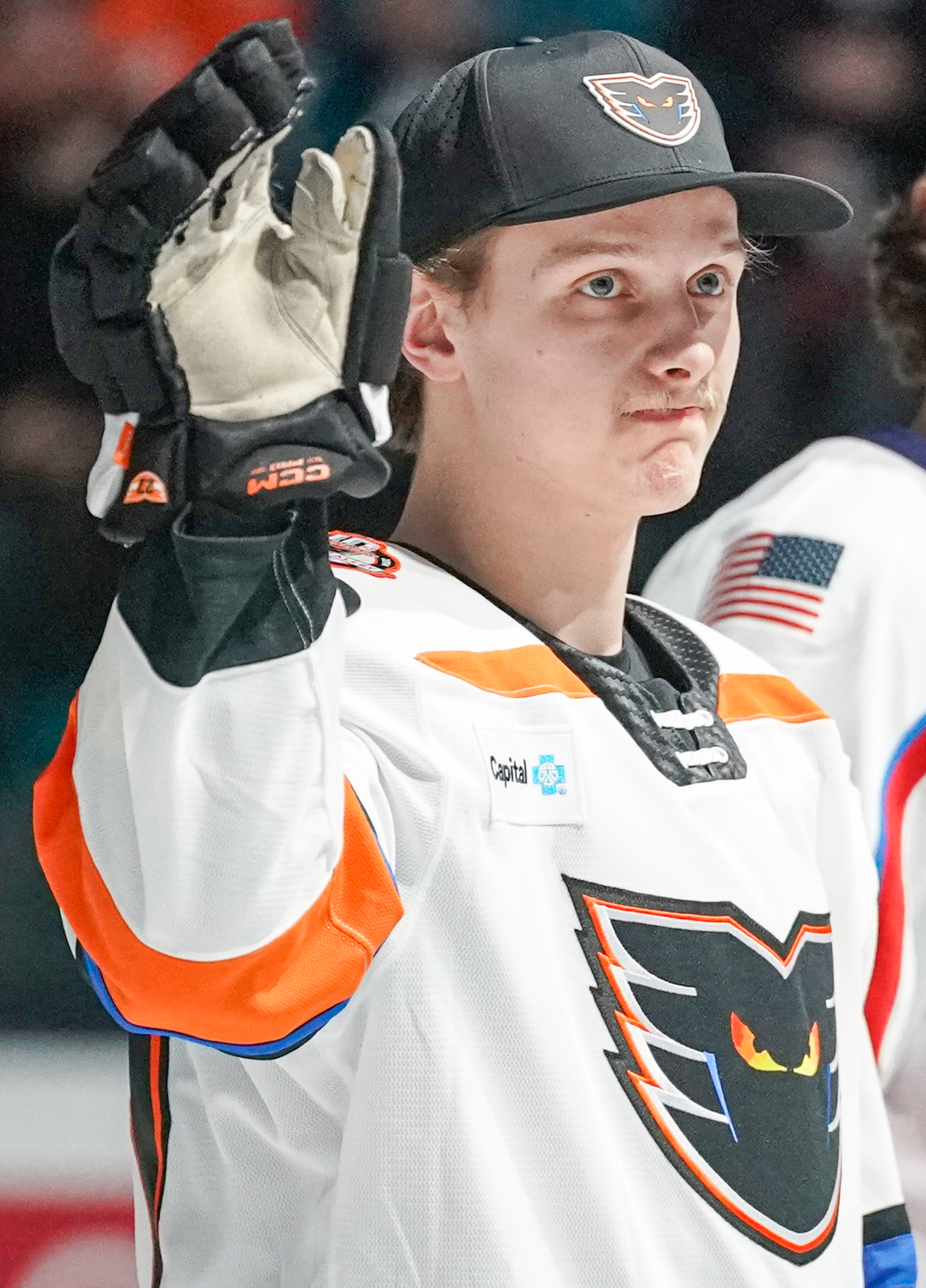
- Tuomaala with the Lehigh Valley Phantoms in 2024
- Born: 8 January 2003 (age 23) Oulu, Finland
- Height: 5 ft 11 in (180 cm)
- Weight: 190 lb (86 kg; 13 st 8 lb)
- Position: Right wing
- Shoots: Right
- SHL team Former teams: Linköping HC; Oulun Kärpät; Vaasan Sport; Jukurit
- NHL draft: 46th overall, 2021; Philadelphia Flyers
- Playing career: 2021–present

Samu Tuomaala (born 8 January 2003) is a Finnish professional ice hockey forward who is currently under contract to Linköping HC of the Swedish Hockey League (SHL). He was drafted 46th overall in the second round of the 2021 NHL entry draft by the Philadelphia Flyers, with whose organization he played parts of three seasons before being traded to the Dallas Stars in 2025.

== Playing career ==
Tuomaala made his professional debut playing with Kärpät of the Finnish Liiga. Tuomaala was a top-rated prospect in the 2021 NHL entry draft., and was selected in the second-round, 46th overall, by the Philadelphia Flyers.

On 15 August 2021, Tuomaala immediately moved to North America following the draft and was signed to a three-year, entry-level contract with the Flyers.

One month into the 2025–26 season, on October 30, 2025, the Flyers traded Tuomaala to the Dallas Stars in exchange for Christian Kyrou. Tuomaala was assigned to remain in the AHL with affiliate, the Texas Stars, and posted 10 points through 16 appearances before he was sidelined through injury.

As a free agent from the Stars, Tuomaala opted to return to Europe in agreeing to a two-year contract with Swedish club, Linköping HC of the SHL, on 13 August 2026.

== International play ==
Tuomaala represented Finland at the 2021 IIHF World U18 Championships where he recorded five goals and six assists in seven games.

== Career statistics ==
=== Regular season and playoffs ===
			Regular season					Playoffs
Season	Team	League	GP	G	A	Pts	PIM	GP	G	A	Pts	PIM
2019–20	Oulun Kärpät	U20	40	15	8	23	12	1	0	0	0	0
2020–21	Oulun Kärpät	U20	30	15	16	31	28	5	1	3	4	2
2020–21	Oulun Kärpät	Liiga	5	0	0	0	0	—	—	—	—	—
2021–22	Lehigh Valley Phantoms	AHL	2	0	0	0	0	—	—	—	—	—
2021–22	Vaasan Sport	Liiga	13	1	1	2	2	—	—	—	—	—
2021–22	Jukurit	Liiga	8	0	1	1	6	1	0	0	0	0
2022–23	Jukurit	U20	10	2	3	5	0	—	—	—	—	—
2022–23	Jukurit	Liiga	14	0	0	0	4	—	—	—	—	—
2022–23	Peliitat	Mestis	2	1	1	2	2	—	—	—	—	—
2022–23	Ketterä	Mestis	29	26	20	46	10	—	—	—	—	—
2023–24	Lehigh Valley Phantoms	AHL	69	15	28	43	12	—	—	—	—	—
2024–25	Lehigh Valley Phantoms	AHL	46	11	21	32	30	—	—	—	—	—
2025–26	Lehigh Valley Phantoms	AHL	3	0	0	0	4	—	—	—	—	—
2025–26	Texas Stars	AHL	16	2	8	10	2	—	—	—	—	—
Liiga totals			40	1	2	3	12	1	0	0	0	0

=== International ===
Year	Team	Event	Result	GP	G	A	Pts	PIM
2019	Finland	U17	7th	5	3	2	5	0
2021	Finland	U18	4th	7	5	6	11	0
Junior totals				12	8	8	16	0
