= Ludwig Persson =

Swedish ice hockey player (born 2003)

- Born: 8 October 2003 (age 22) Gothenburg, Sweden
- Height: 6 ft 0 in (183 cm)
- Weight: 190 lb (86 kg; 13 st 8 lb)
- Position: Left wing
- Shoots: Left
- NHL team (P) Cur. team Former teams: Washington Capitals; Hershey Bears (AHL); Frölunda HC; Jukurit
- NHL draft: 85th overall, 2022; Washington Capitals
- Playing career: 2020–present

Ludwig Persson (born 8 October 2003) is a Swedish professional ice hockey left wingplaying for the Hershey Bears in the American Hockey League (AHL) as a prospect to the Washington Capitals of the National Hockey League (NHL). Persson was drafted 85th overall, in the third round, by the Washington Capitals in the 2022 NHL entry draft.

== Playing career ==
Persson played as a youth and developed within Frölunda HC of the Swedish Hockey League (SHL). Following his third season in the SHL, Persson was selected by the Capitals in the 2022 NHL entry draft and later signed to a three-year, entry-level contract on 16 July 2022.

== International play ==
Medal record

Representing Sweden

Ice hockey

World U18 Championships
| Bronze medal – third place | 2021 United States | |

At the 2021 World U18 Championship, Persson contributed with 2 goals and 4 points in 7 games on the bronze-winning Team Sweden.

== Career statistics ==
=== Regular season and playoffs ===
| | | | Regular season | | | | | Playoffs |
| Season | Team | League | GP | G | A | Pts | PIM | GP | G | A | Pts | PIM |
|---|---|---|---|---|---|---|---|---|---|---|---|---|
| 2019–20 | Vasta Frolunda Jr | J20 | 7 | 1 | 0 | 1 | 4 | — | — | — | — | — |
| 2019–20 | Frolunda HC | SHL | 1 | 0 | 0 | 0 | 0 | — | — | — | — | — |
| 2020–21 | Vasta Frolunda Jr | J20 | 17 | 5 | 9 | 14 | 6 | — | — | — | — | — |
| 2020–21 | Frolunda HC | SHL | 13 | 1 | 1 | 2 | 0 | — | — | — | — | — |
| 2021–22 | Vasta Frolunda Jr | J20 | 41 | 25 | 36 | 61 | 16 | — | — | — | — | — |
| 2021–22 | Frolunda HC | SHL | 10 | 0 | 0 | 0 | 2 | — | — | — | — | — |
| 2022–23 | BIK Karlskoga | Allsv | 45 | 4 | 11 | 15 | 0 | 4 | 0 | 0 | 0 | 2 |
| 2022–23 | Frolunda HC | SHL | 1 | 0 | 0 | 0 | 0 | — | — | — | — | — |
| 2023–24 | Iisalmen Peli-Karhut | Mestis | 48 | 10 | 45 | 55 | 2 | — | — | — | — | — |
| 2024–25 | Jukurit | Liiga | 52 | 4 | 12 | 16 | 29 | — | — | — | — | — |
| 2024–25 | Hershey Bears | AHL | 1 | 0 | 1 | 1 | 0 | — | — | — | — | — |
| SHL totals | | | 25 | 1 | 1 | 2 | 2 | — | — | — | — | — |
| Liiga totals | | | 52 | 4 | 12 | 16 | 29 | — | — | — | — | — |

=== International ===
| Year | Team | Event | Result | GP | G | A | Pts | PIM |
|---|---|---|---|---|---|---|---|---|
| 2019 | Sweden | U17 | 6th | 5 | 2 | 2 | 4 | 2 |
| 2021 | Sweden | U18 | 3rd place, bronze medalist(s) | 7 | 2 | 2 | 4 | 0 |
| Junior totals | | | | 12 | 4 | 4 | 8 | 2 |
