= Brad Lambert =

Brad Lambert may refer to:

- Brad Lambert (American football) (born 1965), American college football coach
- Brad Lambert (ice hockey) (born 2003), Finnish-Canadian ice hockey player
