= 2028 NHL entry draft =

2028 ice hockey draft

General information
- Date: TBA
- Location: TBA

Overview
- First selection: TBA

The 2028 NHL entry draft is scheduled to be the 66th draft for the National Hockey League. The draft is expected to be held during the summer of 2028.

== Eligibility ==
Ice hockey players born between January 1, 2008, and September 15, 2010, are eligible for selection in the 2028 NHL entry draft. Additionally, un-drafted, non-North American players born in 2007 are eligible for the draft; and those players who were drafted in the 2026 NHL entry draft, but not signed by an NHL team and who were born after June 30, 2008, are also eligible to re-enter the draft.

== Traded picks ==
The order of the 2028 entry draft will be finalized upon the conclusion of the 2027–28 NHL season. However, some teams have already exchanged picks for this draft via trade. These picks are listed below.

=== Round one ===
1. The Florida Panthers's first-round pick will go to the Boston Bruins as the result of a trade on March 7, 2025, that sent Brad Marchand to Florida in exchange for this conditional pick. The conditions – Boston will receive first-round pick in 2028 if Florida advances to the 2025 Eastern Conference Final, Marchand plays in 50% of Florida's playoff games, and Florida has traded their first-round pick in 2027 by the time of the draft – was converted on April 16, 2026.

=== Round two ===
1. The Colorado Avalanche's second-round pick will go to the Pittsburgh Penguins as the result of a trade on February 24, 2026, that sent Brett Kulak to Colorado in exchange for Sam Girard and this pick.
2. The Columbus Blue Jackets' second-round pick will go to the Vancouver Canucks as the result of a trade on March 5, 2026, that sent Conor Garland to Columbus in exchange for a third-round pick in 2026 and this pick.
3. The Dallas Stars' second-round pick will go to the Pittsburgh Penguins as the result of a trade on July 10, 2025, that sent Vladislav Kolyachonok to Dallas in exchange for Matt Dumba and this pick.
4. The Edmonton Oilers' second-round pick will go to the Chicago Blackhawks as the result of a trade on March 2, 2026, that sent Connor Murphy to Edmonton in exchange for this pick.
5. The Minnesota Wild's second-round pick will go to the Nashville Predators as the result of a trade on March 3, 2026, that sent Michael McCarron to Minnesota in exchange for this pick.
6. The New Jersey Devils' second-round pick will go to the Nashville Predators as the result of a trade on September 1, 2026, that sent Luke Evangelista to New Jersey in exchange for a conditional first-round pick in 2028 and this pick.
7. The Tampa Bay Lightning's second-round pick will go to the Los Angeles Kings as the result of a trade on March 6, 2026, that sent Corey Perry to Tampa Bay in exchange for this pick.
8. The Vegas Golden Knights' second-round pick will go to the Calgary Flames as the result of a trade on January 18, 2026, that sent Rasmus Andersson to Vegas in exchange for Zach Whitecloud, Abram Wiebe, a conditional first-round pick in 2027 and this pick (being conditional at the time of the trade). The condition – Calgary will receive Vegas' second-round pick in 2028 if Vegas does not win the 2026 Stanley Cup Final – was converted when Vegas lost the Final on June 14, 2026.

=== Round three ===
1. The Edmonton Oilers' third-round pick will go to the Buffalo Sabres as the result of a trade on July 1, 2026, that sent Devon Levi and a seventh-round pick in 2028 to Edmonton in exchange for this pick.
2. The Florida Panthers' third-round pick will go to the Vegas Golden Knights as the result of a trade on June 29, 2026, that sent Akira Schmid to Florida in exchange for this pick.
3. The San Jose Sharks' third-round pick will go to the Pittsburgh Penguins as the result of a trade on July 1, 2025, that sent Alex Nedeljkovic to San Jose in exchange for this pick.
4. The St. Louis Blues' third-round pick will go to the Edmonton Oilers as the result of a trade on August 20, 2024, that sent future considerations to St. Louis in exchange for Paul Fischer and this pick.
5. The Toronto Maple Leafs' third-round pick will go to the Tampa Bay Lightning as the result of a trade on July 1, 2026, that sent Nick Paul to Toronto in exchange for Dennis Hildeby a fourth-round pick in 2027 and this pick.
6. The Vegas Golden Knights' third-round pick will go to the Dallas Stars as the result of a trade on July 1, 2026, that sent Mavrik Bourque and Ilya Lyubushkin to Nashville in exchange for a second-round pick in 2027 and this pick.
  Nashville previously acquired this pick as the result of a trade on March 3, 2026, that sent Cole Smith to Vegas in exchange for Christoffer Sedoff and this pick.

=== Round four ===
1. The Minnesota Wild's fourth-round pick will go to the Calgary Flames as the result of a trade on July 2, 2026, that sent Blake Coleman and Olli Maatta to Minnesota in exchange for Jake Middleton a third-round pick in 2027, a second-round pick in 2029 and this pick.
2. The New York Rangers' fourth-round pick will go to the Boston Bruins as the result of a trade on July 1, 2026, that sent Joonas Korpisalo to the Rangers in exchange for Kalle Vaisanen and this pick.
3. The Pittsburgh Penguins' fourth-round pick will go to the Toronto Maple Leafs as the result of a trade on July 1, 2026, that sent Nick Robertson to Pittsburgh in exchange for this pick.
4. The San Jose Sharks' fourth-round pick will go to the Chicago Blackhawks as the result of a trade on January 8, 2026, that sent Nolan Allan, Laurent Brossoit, and a seventh-round pick in 2028 to San Jose in exchange for Ryan Ellis, Jake Furlong, and this pick.
5. The Toronto Maple Leafs' fourth-round pick will go to the Vancouver Canucks as the result of a trade on July 17, 2025, that sent Dakota Joshua to Toronto in exchange for this pick.

=== Round five ===
1. The Columbus Blue Jackets' fifth-round pick will go to the Colorado Avalanche as the result of a trade on June 25, 2026, that sent Valeri Nichushkin to Columbus in exchange for a second-round pick in 2026, a third-round pick in 2027 and this pick.
2. The Pittsburgh Penguins' fifth-round pick will go to the Nashville Predators as the result of a trade on June 27, 2026, that sent a fifth-round pick in 2026 to Pittsburgh in exchange for this pick.
3. The San Jose Sharks' fifth-round pick will go to the Columbus Blue Jackets as the result of a trade on June 27, 2026, that sent the 101st overall pick in 2026 to Washington in exchange for the 112th overall pick in 2026 and this pick.
  Washington previously acquired this pick as the result of a trade on June 25, 2026, that sent Hendrix Lapierre to Pittsburgh in exchange for a third-round pick in 2027 and this pick.
  Pittsburgh previously acquired this pick as the result of a trade on March 5, 2025, that sent Vincent Desharnais to San Jose in exchange for this pick.

=== Round six ===
No traded picks for this round yet.

=== Round seven ===
1. The Buffalo Sabres' seventh-round pick will go to the Edmonton Oilers as the result of a trade on July 1, 2026, that sent a third-round pick in 2028 to Buffalo in exchange for Devon Levi and this pick.
2. The Calgary Flames' seventh-round pick will go to the Philadelphia Flyers as the result of a trade on January 31, 2025, that sent Joel Farabee and Morgan Frost to Calgary in exchange for Andrei Kuzmenko, Jakob Pelletier, a second-round pick in 2025, and this pick.
3. The Chicago Blackhawks' seventh-round pick will go to the San Jose Sharks as the result of a trade on January 8, 2026, that sent Ryan Ellis, Jake Furlong, and a fourth-round pick in 2028 to Chicago in exchange for Nolan Allan, Laurent Brossoit, and this pick.

=== Unresolved conditional draft picks ===
Round	Team receiving pick	Team granting pick	Condition	Further notes
1	Utah Mammoth	Boston Bruins	Utah will receive Florida's first-round pick in 2028 (via Boston) if the pick is outside of the top ten selections. If the pick is within the top ten selections, Boston will have the option to convey its own first-round pick in 2029.	Utah acquired this pick as the result of a trade on June 26, 2026, that sent JJ Peterka to Boston in exchange for a first-round pick in 2026 and this conditional pick.
1	Nashville Predators (via Calgary Flames and New Jersey Devils)	Colorado Avalanche	Nashville will receive a first-round pick in 2028 if the pick is outside of the top ten selections and has not already been conveyed to the Toronto Maple Leafs. Otherwise, Nashville will receive a first-round pick in 2029.	Nashville acquired this pick as the result of a trade on September 1, 2026, that sent Luke Evangelista to New Jersey in exchange for a second-round pick in 2028 and this conditional pick. New Jersey acquired this pick as the result of a trade on June 23, 2026, that sent Simon Nemec and Maxim Tsyplakov to Calgary in exchange for Etienne Morin, Vegas' conditional 2027 or 2028 first-round pick, the New York Rangers' second-round pick in 2026, and this conditional pick. Calgary previously acquired this pick in a trade on March 6, 2026, that sent Nazem Kadri and a fourth-round pick in 2027 to Colorado in exchange for Victor Olofsson, Maxmilian Curran, a conditional second-round pick in 2027 and this conditional pick.
1	Toronto Maple Leafs	Colorado Avalanche	Toronto will receive a first-round pick in 2028 if Colorado's first-round pick in 2027 is inside of the top ten selections. Otherwise, Toronto will receive Colorado's first-round pick in 2027.	Toronto acquired this pick in a trade on March 5, 2026, that sent Nicolas Roy to Colorado in exchange for a conditional fifth-round pick in 2026 and this conditional pick.
1	Carolina Hurricanes	Dallas Stars	Carolina will receive Dallas' first-round pick in 2028 if the pick is outside of the top 10; otherwise, Carolina will receive Dallas' first-round pick in 2029.	Carolina acquired this pick in a trade on March 7, 2025, that sent Mikko Rantanen to Dallas in exchange for Logan Stankoven, a conditional first-round pick in 2026 or 2027, a third-round pick in 2026, a third-round pick in 2027, and this conditional pick.
1	Chicago Blackhawks	Edmonton Oilers	Chicago will receive Edmonton's first-round pick in 2028 if Edmonton's first-round pick in 2027 is in the top twelve selections and Edmonton has not traded this pick prior to the 2027 trade deadline.	Chicago acquired this pick in a trade on March 4, 2026, that sent Jason Dickinson and Colton Dach to Edmonton in exchange for Andrew Mangiapane and this conditional pick.
1	Vegas Golden Knights	New York Rangers	Vegas will receive a first-round pick in 2028 if the Rangers' first-round pick in 2028 is outside of the top ten picks.	Vegas acquired this pick as the result of a trade on June 26, 2026 that sent Pavel Dorofeyev to the Rangers in exchange for a first and third-round pick in 2026 and this conditional pick.
1	Seattle Kraken	Tampa Bay Lightning	Seattle will receive a first-round pick in 2028 if Tampa Bay's first-round pick in 2027 is inside the top ten selections.	Seattle acquired this pick in a trade on March 5, 2025, that sent Kyle Aucoin, Oliver Bjorkstrand and a fifth-round pick in 2026 to Tampa Bay in exchange for Mikey Eyssimont, a conditional first-round pick in 2027, Toronto's second-round pick in 2025, and this conditional pick.
1	Boston Bruins	Toronto Maple Leafs	Boston will receive Toronto's first-round pick in 2028 if Toronto's first-round pick in 2027 is within the top ten selections and Toronto elects to convey the pick to Philadelphia over Boston, or if Toronto's first-round pick in 2027 is outside of the top ten selections. Otherwise, Boston will receive a first-round pick in 2027.	Boston acquired this pick in a trade on March 7, 2025, that sent Brandon Carlo to Toronto in exchange for Fraser Minten, a fourth-round pick in 2025 and this conditional pick.
1	Philadelphia Flyers	Toronto Maple Leafs	Philadelphia can receive Toronto's first-round pick in 2027 or 2028, at Toronto's choice, if Toronto's first-round pick in 2027 is inside of the top ten selections. Otherwise, Philadelphia will receive a first-round pick in 2027.	Philadelphia acquired this pick in a trade on March 7, 2025, that sent Scott Laughton, a fourth-round pick in 2025 and a sixth-round pick in 2027 to Toronto in exchange for Nikita Grebenkin and this conditional pick.
1	New Jersey Devils (via Calgary Flames)	Vegas Golden Knights	New Jersey will receive Vegas' first-round pick in 2028 if Vegas' first-round pick in 2027 is inside of the top ten selections.	New Jersey acquired this pick as the result of a trade on June 23, 2026, that sent Simon Nemec and Maxim Tsyplakov to Calgary in exchange for Etienne Morin, Colorado's conditional 2028 or 2029 first-round pick, the New York Rangers' second-round pick in 2026, and this conditional pick. Calgary previously acquired this pick in a trade on January 18, 2026, that sent Rasmus Andersson to Vegas in exchange for Zach Whitecloud, Abram Wiebe, a conditional second-round pick in 2028, and this conditional pick.
2 or 3	New York Rangers	Boston Bruins	The Rangers will receive a second-round pick in 2028 if Boston qualifies for the 2027 Eastern Conference Finals or 2028 Eastern Conference Finals and Borgen plays in at least 50% of his clubs (Boston or otherwise) playoff games during the season in which Boston qualifies for the Conference Finals. Otherwise this will remain a third-round pick in 2028.	The Rangers acquired this pick in a trade on July 1, 2026, that sent Will Borgen to Boston in exchange for a second-round pick in 2027 and this conditional pick.
3	Seattle Kraken	Tampa Bay Lightning	Seattle will receive Tampa Bay's third-round pick in 2028 if Tampa Bay's first-round pick in 2027 is in the top ten; otherwise, no pick will be exchanged.	Seattle acquired this pick in a trade on March 5, 2025, that sent Kyle Aucoin, Oliver Bjorkstrand and a fifth-round pick in 2026 to Tampa Bay in exchange for Mikey Eyssimont, Toronto's second-round pick in 2025 and this conditional pick.

== See also ==
- 2023–24 NHL transactions
- 2024–25 NHL transactions
- 2025–26 NHL transactions
- List of first overall NHL draft picks
- List of NHL players
