= Emmitt Finnie =

Canadian ice hockey player (born 2005)

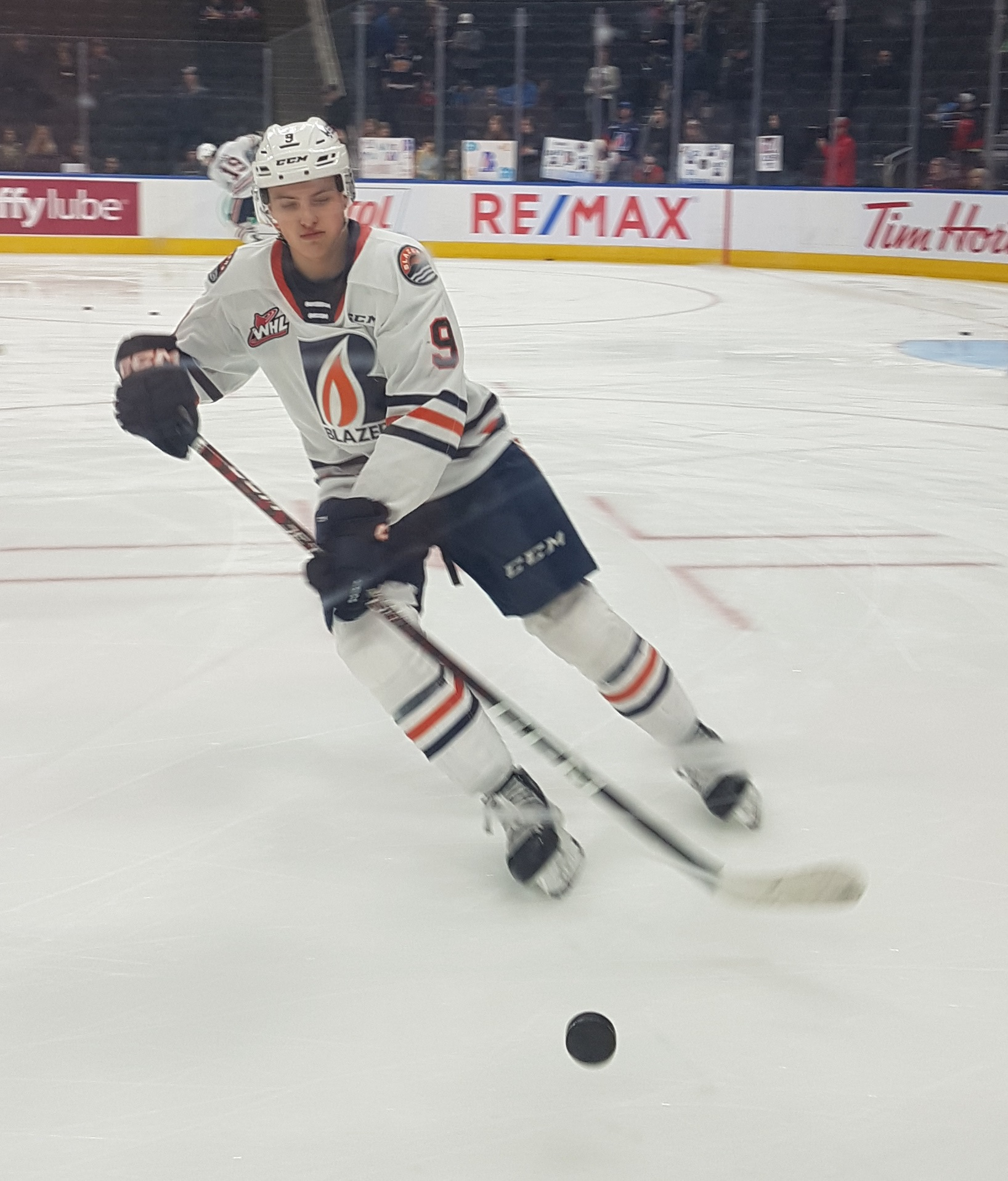
- Finnie in 2023 with the Kamloops Blazers
- Born: June 27, 2005 (age 21) Lethbridge, Alberta, Canada
- Height: 6 ft 1 in (185 cm)
- Weight: 190 lb (86 kg; 13 st 8 lb)
- Position: Forward
- Shoots: Left
- NHL team: Detroit Red Wings
- National team: Canada
- NHL draft: 201st overall, 2023; Detroit Red Wings
- Playing career: 2024–present

Emmitt Finnie (born June 27, 2005) is a Canadian professional ice hockey player who is a forward for the Detroit Red Wings of the National Hockey League (NHL). He was drafted 201st overall by the Red Wings in the 2023 NHL entry draft.

== Playing career ==
As a youth, Finnie played for Yale Hockey Academy in the Canadian Sport School Hockey League.

=== Junior ===
Finnie was selected by the Kamloops Blazers in the 4th round, 82nd overall, in the 2020 WHL Prospects Draft. In his final year in the WHL, Finnie was named the captain of the Kamloops Blazers. At the conclusion of the season, Finnie was named to the WHL Western Conference Second All-Star Team and was a finalist for the Brad Hornung Memorial Trophy.

=== Professional ===
After drafting Finnie in 2023, the Detroit Red Wings signed him to a three-year, entry-level contract on March 26, 2024. Embarking on his first full professional season, Finnie made the Red Wings opening season roster to begin the 2025–26 season. He scored his first NHL goal on October 19, 2025, against the Edmonton Oilers, also scoring a second goal into an empty net late in the same game.

== Career statistics ==
=== Regular season and playoffs ===
			Regular season					Playoffs
Season	Team	League	GP	G	A	Pts	PIM	GP	G	A	Pts	PIM
2021–22	Kamloops Blazers	WHL	48	0	6	6	2	1	0	0	0	0
2022–23	Kamloops Blazers	WHL	64	9	26	35	12	14	4	3	7	0
2023–24	Kamloops Blazers	WHL	62	19	40	59	28	—	—	—	—	—
2023–24	Grand Rapids Griffins	AHL	3	0	0	0	0	—	—	—	—	—
2024–25	Kamloops Blazers	WHL	55	37	47	84	26	—	—	—	—	—
2024–25	Grand Rapids Griffins	AHL	10	1	5	6	0	3	0	0	0	0
2025–26	Detroit Red Wings	NHL	82	13	17	30	6	—	—	—	—	—
NHL totals			82	13	17	30	6	—	—	—	—	—

=== International ===
Year	Team	Event	Result	GP	G	A	Pts	PIM
2026	Canada	WC	4th	6	1	1	2	0
Senior totals				6	1	1	2	0
