= Kevin Korchinski =

Canadian ice hockey player (born 2004)

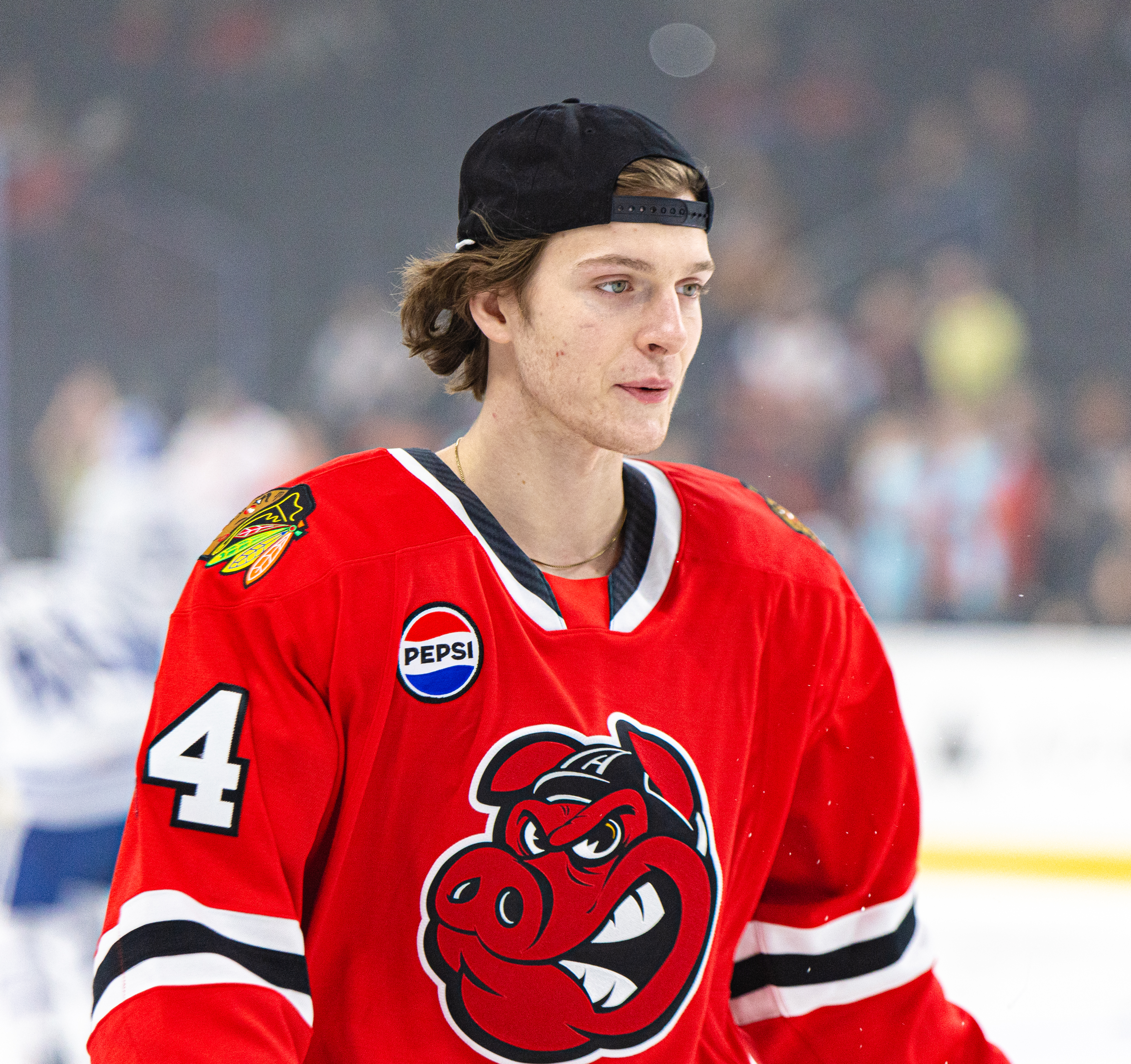
- Korchinski at the AHL All-Star Game in 2025
- Born: June 21, 2004 (age 22) Saskatoon, Saskatchewan, Canada
- Height: 6 ft 2 in (188 cm)
- Weight: 185 lb (84 kg; 13 st 3 lb)
- Position: Defence
- Shoots: Left
- NHL team: Chicago Blackhawks
- NHL draft: 7th overall, 2022; Chicago Blackhawks
- Playing career: 2023–present

Kevin Korchinski (born June 21, 2004) is a Canadian professional ice hockey player who is a defenceman for the Chicago Blackhawks of the National Hockey League (NHL). He was selected by the Blackhawks seventh overall in the 2022 NHL entry draft.

== Playing career ==
On August 11, 2022, Korchinski signed a three-year, entry-level contract with the Chicago Blackhawks.

During the 2022–23 WHL season, Korchinski's performance with the Seattle Thunderbirds earned him a spot on the Canadian Hockey League's (CHL) Third All-Star Team. The Thunderbirds entered the 2023 WHL playoffs as strong contenders and went on to capture the Ed Chynoweth Cup as league champions. Their championship win secured them a place in the 2023 Memorial Cup tournament, where they advanced to the final but were ultimately defeated by the Quebec Remparts.

Korchinski earned a spot on the Blackhawks' opening night roster for the 2023–24 NHL season and made his league debut on October 10, 2023. He netted his first NHL goal on November 9 in a game against the Tampa Bay Lightning. With his American Hockey League (AHL) eligibility now in place, the Blackhawks reassigned him to their affiliate, the Rockford IceHogs, on October 2, 2024, to further his development.

== International play ==
Medal record

Men's ice hockey

Representing Canada

World Junior Championships
Gold medal – first place	2023 Canada	

On December 12, 2022, Korchinski was selected to Canada junior team for the 2023 World Junior Championships. He contributed one goal and three assists over seven games, helping the team capture the gold medal.

== Career statistics ==
=== Regular season and playoffs ===
			Regular season					Playoffs
Season	Team	League	GP	G	A	Pts	PIM	GP	G	A	Pts	PIM
2019–20	Seattle Thunderbirds	WHL	1	0	0	0	0	―	―	―	―	―
2020–21	Seattle Thunderbirds	WHL	23	0	10	10	4	―	―	―	―	―
2021–22	Seattle Thunderbirds	WHL	67	4	61	65	40	25	6	13	19	22
2022–23	Seattle Thunderbirds	WHL	54	11	62	73	54	19	3	11	14	10
2023–24	Chicago Blackhawks	NHL	76	5	10	15	20	―	―	―	―	―
2024–25	Chicago Blackhawks	NHL	16	1	1	2	8	―	―	―	―	―
2024–25	Rockford IceHogs	AHL	56	3	24	27	40	7	2	2	4	24
2025–26	Rockford IceHogs	AHL	53	2	24	26	48	―	―	―	―	―
2025–26	Chicago Blackhawks	NHL	13	0	2	2	4	―	―	―	―	―
NHL totals			105	6	13	19	32	―	―	―	―	―

=== International ===
Year	Team	Event	Result	GP	G	A	Pts	PIM
2023	Canada	WJC	1st place, gold medalist(s)	7	1	3	4	0
Junior totals				7	1	3	4	0

== Awards and honours ==
Award	Year	Ref
CHL
Third All-Star Team	2023	
WHL
Ed Chynoweth Cup champion	2023	

Awards and achievements
Preceded by Nolan Allan	Chicago Blackhawks first-round draft pick 2022	Succeeded by Frank Nazar
