= 2022–23 WHL season =

- League: Western Hockey League
- Sport: Ice hockey
- Duration: Regular season September 23, 2022 – March 26, 2023; Playoffs; March 31, 2023 – May 19, 2023
- Teams: 22
- TV partner(s): KRCW-TV, KZJO, CBC, TSN, RDS

Regular season
- Scotty Munro Memorial Trophy: Winnipeg Ice (2)
- Season MVP: Connor Bedard (Regina Pats)
- Top scorer: Connor Bedard (Regina Pats)

Playoffs
- Playoffs MVP: Thomas Milic (Thunderbirds)
- Finals champions: Seattle Thunderbirds (2)
- Runners-up: Winnipeg Ice

WHL seasons
- 2021–22 2023–24

2022–23 CHL seasons
- League: Canadian Hockey League
- Sport: Ice hockey
- Duration: OHL; September 2022–May 2023; QMJHL; September 2022–May 2023; WHL; September 2022–May 2023
- Teams: 60
- TV partner(s): CBC Television/Gem, TSN, RDS, Rogers TV, Shaw TV
- Season MVP: Connor Bedard (Regina Pats) (WHL)
- Top scorer: Connor Bedard (Regina Pats) (WHL)

Memorial Cup
- Finals champions: Quebec Remparts (QMJHL) (3rd title)
- Runners-up: Seattle Thunderbirds (WHL)

The 2022–23 WHL season was the 57th season of the Western Hockey League (WHL). The regular season started on September 23, 2022, and ended on March 26, 2023, with the 2023 WHL Playoffs beginning on March 31 and ending on May 19. Teams went back to inter-conference games for first time since the 2019–20 season.

The Seattle Thunderbirds defeated the regular season-champion Winnipeg Ice 4 games to 1 in the finals to win their second Ed Chynoweth Cup and earn a spot in the 2023 Memorial Cup tournament, which was hosted by the Kamloops Blazers.

Map of WHL, 2019–20 to 2022–23
East Division
Central Division
BC Division
US Division

== Standings ==
=== Conference standings ===
Western Conference
Pos	Div	Team	Pld	W	L	OTL	SOL	GF	GA	Pts
1	U.S.	x, y – Seattle Thunderbirds	68	54	11	1	2	300	155	111
2	B.C.	x, y – Kamloops Blazers	68	48	13	4	3	313	198	103
3	U.S.	x – Portland Winterhawks	68	40	20	5	3	244	218	88
4	B.C.	x – Prince George Cougars	68	37	24	6	1	290	241	81
5	U.S.	x – Tri-City Americans	68	34	26	5	3	256	245	76
6	U.S.	x – Everett Silvertips	68	33	32	2	1	221	245	69
7	B.C.	x – Vancouver Giants	68	28	32	5	3	188	238	64
8	B.C.	x – Kelowna Rockets	68	27	37	4	0	210	256	58
9	B.C.	e – Victoria Royals	68	17	43	6	2	199	323	42
10	U.S.	e – Spokane Chiefs	68	15	43	4	6	195	314	40

Source: "Standings". CHL.ca. WHL.
e – eliminated from playoff contention; x – clinched playoff; y – clinched division

Eastern Conference
Pos	Div	Team	Pld	W	L	OTL	SOL	GF	GA	Pts
1	East	x, y, z – Winnipeg Ice	68	57	10	1	0	325	177	115
2	Central	x, y – Red Deer Rebels	68	43	19	3	3	248	189	92
3	East	x – Saskatoon Blades	68	48	15	4	1	257	171	101
4	East	x – Moose Jaw Warriors	68	41	24	0	3	252	237	85
5	Central	x – Lethbridge Hurricanes	68	36	26	3	3	204	207	78
6	East	x – Regina Pats	68	34	30	3	1	262	277	72
7	Central	x – Calgary Hitmen	68	31	29	5	3	220	224	70
8	Central	x – Medicine Hat Tigers	68	30	29	8	1	248	224	69
9	Central	e – Swift Current Broncos	68	31	33	1	3	227	242	66
10	East	e – Brandon Wheat Kings	68	26	33	8	1	212	242	61
11	East	e – Prince Albert Raiders	68	28	37	3	0	198	239	59
12	Central	e – Edmonton Oil Kings	68	10	54	4	0	131	338	24

Source: "Standings". CHL.ca. WHL.
e – eliminated from playoff contention; x – clinched playoff; y – clinched division; z – best regular season record

== Statistical leaders ==
=== Scoring leaders ===
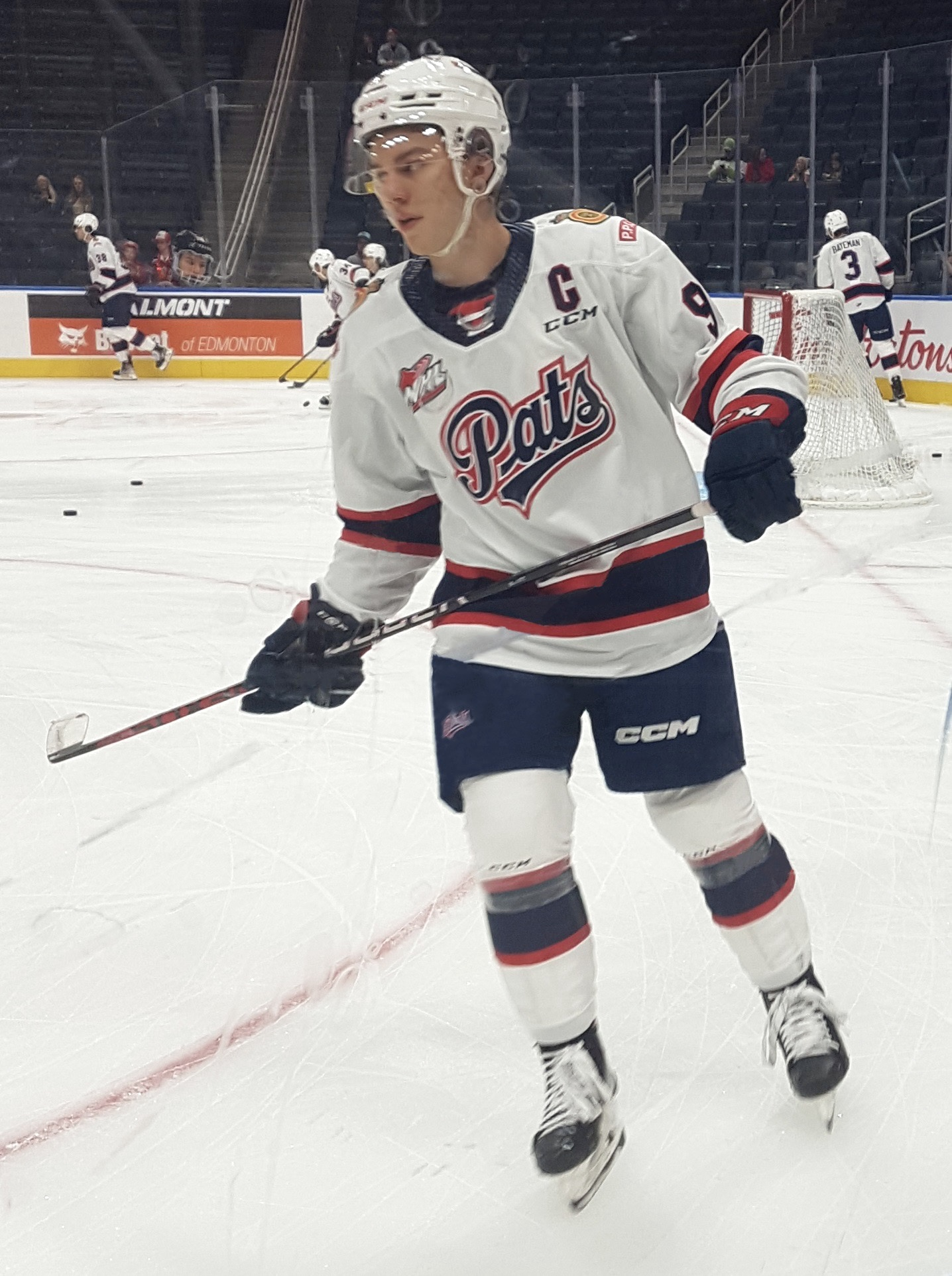
Connor Bedard led the league in scoring with 143 points

Players are listed by points, then goals.

Note: GP = Games played; G = Goals; A = Assists; Pts. = Points; PIM = Penalty minutes

Player	Team	GP	G	A	Pts	PIM
Connor Bedard	Regina Pats	57	71	72	143	62
Chase Wheatcroft	Prince George Cougars	68	47	60	107	46
Zach Benson	Winnipeg Ice	60	36	62	98	49
Logan Stankoven	Kamloops Blazers	48	34	63	97	17
Riley Heidt	Prince George Cougars	68	25	72	97	36
Andrew Cristall	Kelowna Rockets	54	39	56	95	50
Matthew Savoie	Winnipeg Ice	62	38	57	95	26
Connor McClennon	Winnipeg Ice	64	46	46	92	49
Koehn Ziemmer	Prince George Cougars	68	41	48	89	43
Jagger Firkus	Moose Jaw Warriors	66	40	48	88	24

=== Leading goaltenders ===
These are the goaltenders that lead the league in GAA that played at least 1,200 minutes.

Note: GP = Games played; Mins = Minutes played; W = Wins; L = Losses; OTL = Overtime losses; SOL = Shootout losses; SO = Shutouts; GAA = Goals against average; Sv% = Save percentage

Player	Team	GP	Mins	W	L	OTL	SOL	SO	GAA	SV%
Thomas Milic	Seattle Thunderbirds	33	1,964	27	3	1	1	4	2.08	0.928
Scott Ratzlaff	Seattle Thunderbirds	34	2,011	25	8	0	1	5	2.15	0.918
Austin Elliott	Saskatoon Blades	37	2,123	25	6	3	0	2	2.20	0.911
Daniel Hauser	Winnipeg Ice	42	2,504	37	4	1	0	2	2.28	0.917
Rhett Stoesser	Red Deer Rebels	25	1,480	19	6	0	0	2	2.35	0.910

== 2023 WHL Playoffs ==
Conference Quarterfinals	Conference Semifinals
E1	Winnipeg	4
E8	Medicine Hat	0
E1	Winnipeg	4
E4	Moose Jaw	2
E2	Red Deer	4
E7	Calgary	1
Eastern
E3	Saskatoon	4
E6	Regina	3
E2	Red Deer	3
E3	Saskatoon	4
E4	Moose Jaw	4
E5	Lethbridge	0
Note: Pairings are re-seeded after the first round.
W1	Seattle	4
W8	Kelowna	0
W1	Seattle	4
W4	Prince George	0
W2	Kamloops	4
W7	Vancouver	0
Western
W3	Portland	4
W6	Everett	1
W2	Kamloops	4
W3	Portland	0
W4	Prince George	4
W5	Tri-City	2

Conference Finals
E1	Winnipeg	4
E3	Saskatoon	0
W1	Seattle	4
W2	Kamloops	2

WHL Championship
E1	Winnipeg	1
W1	Seattle	4

== Conference Quarter-finals ==
=== Eastern Conference ===
==== (E1) Winnipeg Ice vs. (E8) Medicine Hat Tigers ====
March 31	Medicine Hat Tigers	3–5	Winnipeg Ice	Wayne Fleming Arena	Recap
Andrew Basha (1) - 11:01		First period	1:50 - pp - Zack Ostapchuk (1); 8:22 - Matthew Savoie (1)
No scoring		Second period	10:28 - pp - Evan Friesen (1)
Andrew Basha (2) - pp - 10:00; Rhett Parsons (1) - 19:49		Third period	4:55 - pp - Matthew Savoie (2); 18:53 - en - Matthew Savoie (3)
Beckett Langkow (30 saves / 34 shots)		Goalie stats	Daniel Hauser (33 saves / 36 shots)

April 1	Medicine Hat Tigers	2–5	Winnipeg Ice	Wayne Fleming Arena	Recap
No scoring		First period	12:44 - Briley Wood (1)
Andrew Basha (3) - 6:20		Second period	1:33 - Zack Ostapchuk (2); 15:50 - pp - Connor McClennon (1)
11:58 - pp - Dallon Melin (1)		Third period	13:49 - pp - Connor McClennon (2); 19:33 - en - Matthew Savoie (4)
Beckett Langkow (17 saves / 21 shots)		Goalie stats	Daniel Hauser (25 saves / 27 shots)

April 4	Winnipeg Ice	7–2	Medicine Hat Tigers	Co-op Place	Recap
Zack Ostapchuk (3) - 1:00; Evan Friesen (2) - 5:45; Matthew Savoie (5) - 5:58		First period	8:21 - Brendan Lee (1)
Ty Nash (1) - 11:48; Conor Geekie (1) - 14:28		Second period	No scoring
Connor McClennon (3) - pp - 0:49; Easton Armstrong (1) - pp - 8:17		Third period	12:29 - pp - Gavin McKenna (1)
Daniel Hauser (23 saves / 25 shots)		Goalie stats	Beckett Langkow (16 shots / 23 saves); Zach Zahara (1 save / 1 shot)

April 5	Winnipeg Ice	3–2	Medicine Hat Tigers	Co-op Place	Recap
Matthew Savoie (6) - sh - 1:14		First period	1:30 - pp - Dru Krebs (1)
Owen Pederson (1) - 10:50		Second period	15:59 - Hunter St. Martin (1)
Ty Nash (2) - 1:10		Third period	No scoring
Daniel Hauser (30 saves / 32 shots)		Goalie stats	Beckett Langkow (18 saves / 21 shots)

Winnipeg wins series 4–0

==== (E2) Red Deer Rebels vs. (E7) Calgary Hitmen ====
March 31	Calgary Hitmen	0–3	Red Deer Rebels	Peavey Mart Centrium	Recap
No scoring		First period	17:56 - Kai Uchacz (1)
No scoring		Second period	No scoring
No scoring		Third period	13:22 - Jayden Grubbe (1); 17:56 - Frantisek Formanek (1)
Brayden Peters (33 saves / 36 shots)		Goalie stats	Kyle Kelsey (25 saves / 25 shots)

April 1	Calgary Hitmen	2–1	OT	Red Deer Rebels	Peavey Mart Centrium	Recap
No scoring		First period		No scoring
No scoring		Second period		No scoring
Sean Tschigerl (1) - 18:23		Third period		11:20 - Christoffer Sedoff (1)
David Adaszynski (1) - 16:42		First overtime period		No scoring
Brayden Peters (38 saves / 39 shots)		Goalie stats		Kyle Kelsey (36 saves / 38 shots)

April 3	Red Deer Rebels	4–2	Calgary Hitmen	Scotiabank Saddledome	Recap
Matteo Fabrizi (1) - 16:07; Kai Uchacz (2) - 16:56		First period	13:42 - Carson Wetsch (1)
Frantisek Formanek (2) - 0:46		Second period	3:56 - pp - Carter MacAdams (1)
Kai Uchacz (3) - en - 19:23		Third period	No scoring
Kyle Kelsey (36 saves / 38 shots)		Goalie stats	Brayden Peters (42 saves / 45 shots)

April 5	Red Deer Rebels	6–1	Calgary Hitmen	Scotiabank Saddledome	Recap
No scoring		First period	No scoring
Ben King (1) - pp - 8:04; Ollie Josephson (1) - sh - 9:07; Jhett Larson (1) - sh - 18:31; Hunter Mayo (1) - 19:28		Second period	5:30 - pp - Ethan Moore (1)
Ben King (2) - pp - 5:56; Kai Uchacz (4) - pp - 12:09		Third period	No scoring
Kyle Kelsey (36 saves / 37 shots)		Goalie stats	Brayden Peters (33 saves / 39 shots); Ethan Buenaventura (2 saves / 2 shots)

April 7	Calgary Hitmen	5–6	OT	Red Deer Rebels	Peavey Mart Centrium	Recap
David Adaszynski (2) - pp - 13:19; Brandon Whynott (1) - 14:09		First period		4:22 - pp - Kalan Lind (1); 19:23 - pp - Mats Lindgren (1)
Maxim Muranov (1) - 12:19		Second period		7:32 - pp - Mats Lindgren (2)
Oliver Tulk (1) - pp - 2:46; Maxim Muranov (2) - sh - 9:32		Third period		15:32 - Matteo Fabrizi (2); 17:18 - Christoffer Sedoff (2)
No scoring		First overtime period		4:56 - Ben King (3)
Brayden Peters (38 saves / 44 shots)		Goalie stats		Kyle Kelsey (19 saves / 24 shots)

Red Deer wins series 4–1

==== (E3) Saskatoon Blades vs. (E6) Regina Pats ====
March 31	Regina Pats	6–1	Saskatoon Blades	SaskTel Centre	Recap
No scoring		First period	No scoring
Zackary Shantz (1) - 4:11; Connor Bedard (1) - 13:12		Second period	No scoring
Riley Ginnell (1) - 0:09; Stanislav Svozil (1) - 9:54; Connor Bedard (2) - 13:27; Tye Spencer (1) - en - 17:29		Third period	0:31 - Lukas Hansen (1)
Drew Sim (27 saves / 28 shots)		Goalie stats	Austin Elliot (19 saves / 24 shots)

April 2	Regina Pats	6–5	OT	Saskatoon Blades	SaskTel Centre	Recap
Stanislav Svozil (2) - 5:08; Connor Bedard (3) - 13:33		First period		18:01 - Justin Lies (1)
Zack Stringer (1) - pp - 5:32; Connor Bedard (4) - 12:31		Second period		2:48 - Lukas Hansen (2); 6:42 - Josh Pillar (1)
Connor Bedard (5) - 11:10		Third period		8:32 - Jayden Wiens (1); 8:50 - Vaughn Watterodt (1)
Zack Stringer (2) - pp - 2:58		First overtime period		No scoring
Drew Sim (42 saves / 47 shots)		Goalie stats		Austin Elliot (9 saves / 13 shots); Ethan Chadwick (4 saves / 6 shots)

April 4	Saskatoon Blades	4–3	OT	Regina Pats	Brandt Centre	Recap
Jayden Wiens (2) - pp - 12:21		First period		2:32 - Stanislav Svozil (3); 13:25 - Alexander Suzdalev (1)
No scoring		Second period		No scoring
Egor Sidorov (1) - pp - 10:32; Brandon Lisowsky (1) - pp - 19:33		Third period		9:39 - Connor Bedard (6)
Egor Sidorov (2) - 5:19		First overtime period		No scoring
Ethan Chadwick (21 saves / 24 shots)		Goalie stats		Drew Sim (33 saves / 37 shots)

April 5	Saskatoon Blades	4–3	OT	Regina Pats	Brandt Centre	Recap
No scoring		First period		No scoring
Egor Sidorov (3) - pp - 7:18		Second period		19:35 - pp - Connor Bedard (7)
Jayden Wiens (3) - 2:42; Charlie Wright (1) - 10:01		Third period		0:13 - Connor Bedard (8); 0:53 - Tanner Howe (1)
Jake Chiasson (1) - 7:20		First overtime period		No scoring
Ethan Chadwick (23 saves / 26 shots)		Goalie stats		Drew Sim (33 saves / 37 shots)

April 7	Regina Pats	2–4	Saskatoon Blades	SaskTel Centre	Recap
Zack Stringer (3) - pp - 11:24		First period	3:46 - Vaughn Watterodt (2); 5:26 - pp - Egor Sidorov (4)
No scoring		Second period	15:52 - Conner Roulette (1)
Connor Bedard (9) - 3:09		Third period	10:46 - Egor Sidorov (5)
Drew Sim (29 saves / 33 shots)		Goalie stats	Ethan Chadwick (20 saves / 22 shots)

April 8	Saskatoon Blades	3–5	Regina Pats	Brandt Centre	Recap
Jayden Wiens (4) - 9:42		First period	14:53 - Alexander Suzdalev (2)
Trevor Wong (1) - 17:34		Second period	5:04 - pp - Alexander Suzdalev (3); 12:45 - Tanner Howe (2)
Trevor Wong (2) - 1:04		Third period	1:59 - Connor Bedard (10); 11:24 - Zackary Shantz (2)
Ethan Chadwick (15 saves / 20 shots)		Goalie stats	Drew Sim (27 saves / 30 shots)

April 10	Regina Pats	1–4	Saskatoon Blades	SaskTel Centre	Recap
No scoring		First period	No scoring
No scoring		Second period	19:46 - Spencer Shugrue (1)
Stanislav Svozil (4) - 13:10		Third period	7:56 - Jake Chiasson (2); 17:50 - Vaughn Watterodt (3); 18:11 - en - Trevor Wong (3)
Drew Sim (36 saves / 39 shots)		Goalie stats	Austin Elliot (25 saves / 26 shots)

Saskatoon wins series 4–3

==== (E4) Moose Jaw Warriors vs. (E5) Lethbridge Hurricanes ====
March 31	Lethbridge Hurricanes	1–2	2OT	Moose Jaw Warriors	Moose Jaw Events Centre	Recap
No scoring		First period		No scoring
Cole Shepard (1) - sh - 12:04		Second period		4:53 - Logan Dowhaniuk (1)
No scoring		Third period		No scoring
No scoring		Second overtime period		19:43 - pp - Jagger Firkus (1)
Bryan Thomson (52 saves / 54 shots)		Goalie stats		Connor Ungar (50 saves / 51 shots)

April 1	Lethbridge Hurricanes	1–5	Moose Jaw Warriors	Moose Jaw Events Centre	Recap
No scoring		First period	13:06 - pp - Atley Calvert (1)
No scoring		Second period	8:28 - Ryder Korczak (1)
Anton Astashevich (1) - pp - 13:42		Third period	11:18 - Martin Ryšavý (1); 14:29 - Denton Mateychuk (1); 16:08 - Lucas Brenton (1)
Bryan Thomson (29 saves / 34 shots)		Goalie stats	Connor Ungar (21 saves / 22 shots)

April 4	Moose Jaw Warriors	6–2	Lethbridge Hurricanes	Enmax Centre	Recap
Atley Calvert (2) - 5:03; Jagger Firkus (2) - 18:52		First period	11:13 - pp - Jett Jones (1)
Jagger Firkus (3) - 8:16; Jagger Firkus (4) - 11:28; Martin Ryšavý (2) - 14:58		Second period	No scoring
Atley Calvert (3) - en - 19:59		Third period	7:20 - Brayden Edwards (1)
Connor Ungar (24 saves / 26 shots)		Goalie stats	Bryan Thomson (13 saves / 18 shots); Harrison Meneghin (5 saves / 5 shots)

April 5	Moose Jaw Warriors	5–2	Lethbridge Hurricanes	Enmax Centre	Recap
Brayden Yager (1) - 13:56		First period	8:50 - Tyson Zimmer (1)
Maximus Wanner (1) - 5:15		Second period	19:00 - Hayden Smith (1)
Lynden Lakovic (1) - 4:48; Denton Mateychuk (2) - 14:32; Brayden Yager (2) - en - 19:29		Third period	No scoring
Connor Ungar (28 saves / 30 shots)		Goalie stats	Harrison Meneghin (25 saves / 29 shots)

Moose Jaw wins series 4–0

=== Western Conference ===
==== (W1) Seattle Thunderbirds vs. (W8) Kelowna Rockets ====
March 31	Kelowna Rockets	2–3	Seattle Thunderbirds	accesso ShoWare Center	Recap
Jackson DeSouza (1) - 11:02		First period	No scoring
Caden Price (1) - pp - 7:21		Second period	19:32 - Dylan Guenther (1)
No scoring		Third period	3:22 - Dylan Guenther (2); 5:53 - pp - Reid Schaefer (1)
Jari Kykkanen (36 saves / 39 shots)		Goalie stats	Thomas Milic (23 saves / 25 shots)

April 1	Kelowna Rockets	1–4	Seattle Thunderbirds	accesso ShoWare Center	Recap
No scoring		First period	12:02 - pp - Dylan Guenther (3)
Dylan Wightman (1) - 7:38		Second period	No scoring
No scoring		Third period	9:35 - Lucas Ciona (1); 15:35 - Nolan Allan (1); 17:01 - en - Jared Davidson (1)
Jari Kykkanen (44 saves / 47 shots)		Goalie stats	Thomas Milic (25 saves / 26 shots)

April 4	Seattle Thunderbirds	4–1	Kelowna Rockets	Prospera Place	Recap
No scoring		First period	No scoring
No scoring		Second period	15:40 - Andrew Cristall (1)
Dylan Guenther (4) - 3:31; Jordan Gustafson (1) - 11:07; Lucas Ciona (2) - 13:05; Kyle Crnkovic (1) - sh - en - 19:07		Third period	No scoring
Thomas Milic (24 saves / 25 shots)		Goalie stats	Jari Kykkanen (29 saves / 32 shots)

April 5	Seattle Thunderbirds	3–0	Kelowna Rockets	Prospera Place	Recap
No scoring		First period	No scoring
Lucas Ciona (2) - pp - 8:42		Second period	No scoring
Dylan Guenther (5) - 9:25; Jordan Gustafson (2) - 13:13		Third period	No scoring
Thomas Milic (19 saves / 19 shots)		Goalie stats	Talyn Boyko (35 saves / 38 shots)

Seattle wins series 4–0

==== (W2) Kamloops Blazers vs. (W7) Vancouver Giants ====
March 31	Vancouver Giants	0–8	Kamloops Blazers	Sandman Centre	Recap
No scoring		First period	2:08 - pp - Logan Stankoven (1); 6:18 - Emmitt Finnie (1); 7:10 - Dylan Sydor (1); 14:44 - Logan Stankoven (2)
No scoring		Second period	1:42 - Ryan Hofer (1); 3:59 - pp - Caedan Bankier (1); 6:12 - pp - Logan Stankoven (3)
No scoring		Third period	17:19 - Ashton Ferster (1)
Jesper Vikman (15 saves / 22 shots); Brett Mirwald (30 saves / 31 shots)		Goalie stats	Dylan Ernst (15 saves / 15 shots)

April 1	Vancouver Giants	1–6	Kamloops Blazers	Sandman Centre	Recap
No scoring		First period	5:41 - Ryan Hofer (2); 6:00 - Olen Zellweger (1)
No scoring		Second period	0:49 - pp - Caedan Bankier (2)
Samuel Honzek (1) - pp - 12:55		Third period	6:43 - Daylan Kuefler (1); 7:55 - Dylan Sydor (2); 13:06 - Emmitt Finnie (2)
Brett Mirwald (49 shots / 55 saves)		Goalie stats	Dylan Ernst (25 shots / 26 saves)

April 4	Kamloops Blazers	5–0	Vancouver Giants	Langley Events Centre	Recap
Logan Stankoven (4) - 7:37		First period	No scoring
Emmitt Finnie (3) - 2:20		Second period	No scoring
Ryan Hofer (3) - 3:05; Caedan Bankier (3) - 5:03; Caedan Bankier (4) - 17:46		Third period	No scoring
Dylan Ernst (17 saves / 17 shots)		Goalie stats	Jesper Vikman (41 shots / 45 saves)

April 6	Kamloops Blazers	5–4	OT	Vancouver Giants	Langley Events Centre	Recap
Ryan Hofer (4) - pp - 6:51; Ryan Hofer (5) - 16:23; Connor Levis (1) - pp - 19:58		First period		5:06 - Ty Thorpe (1); 19:29 - sh - Ty Thorpe (2)
No scoring		Second period		No scoring
Olen Zellweger (2) - 3:45		Third period		0:52 - pp - Ty Thorpe (3); 15:00 - pp - Skyler Bruce (1)
Olen Zellweger (3) - 19:58		First overtime period		No scoring
Dylan Ernst (31 saves / 35 shots)		Goalie stats		Jesper Vikman (62 saves / 67 shots)

Kamloops wins series 4–0

==== (W3) Portland Winterhawks vs. (W6) Everett Silvertips ====
March 31	Everett Silvertips	3–4	Portland Winterhawks	Veterans Memorial Coliseum	Recap
Austin Roest (1) - 7:10		First period	8:52 - pp - Robbie Fromm-Delorme (1)
No scoring		Second period	5:26 - pp - Marcus Nguyen (1)
Jackson Berezowski (1) - pp - 4:17; Austin Roest (2) - 16:49		Third period	10:59 - Marcus Nguyen (2); 12:20 - James Stefan (1)
Tyler Palmer (33 saves / 37 shots)		Goalie stats	Jan Špunar (31 saves / 34 shots)

April 1	Everett Silvertips	0–4	Portland Winterhawks	Veterans Memorial Coliseum	Recap
No scoring		First period	10:23 - Marcus Nguyen (3); 13:38 - Marcus Nguyen (4)
No scoring		Second period	15:46 - pp - Jack O'Brien (1)
No scoring		Third period	18:44 - en - Jack O'Brien (2)
Tyler Palmer (28 saves / 31 shots)		Goalie stats	Jan Špunar (23 saves / 23 shots)

April 3	Portland Winterhawks	6–1	Everett Silvertips	Angel of the Winds Arena	Recap
Kyle Chyzowski (1) - 7:09		First period	No scoring
Gabe Klassen (1) - 3:28; James Stefan (2) - pp - 17:11; Kyle Chyzowski (2) - 17:34		Second period	No scoring
James Stefan (3) - pp - 0:29; Nicholas Johnson (1) - 15:53		Third period	17:07 - Jackson Berezowski (2)
Jan Špunar (38 saves / 39 shots)		Goalie stats	Tyler Palmer (18 saves / 24 shots)

April 7	Portland Winterhawks	0–5	Everett Silvertips	Angel of the Winds Arena	Recap
No scoring		First period	2:49 - Caden Zaplitny (1); 4:14 - Beau Courtney (1)
No scoring		Second period	19:08 - pp - Jackson Berezowski (3)
No scoring		Third period	2:24 - Roan Woodward (1); 14:49 - Austin Roest (3)
Jan Špunar (31 shots / 36 saves)		Goalie stats	Tyler Palmer (27 shots / 27 saves)

April 8	Everett Silvertips	2–3	OT	Portland Winterhawks	Veterans Memorial Coliseum	Recap
No scoring		First period		17:39 - Gabe Klassen (2)
Austin Roest (4) - pp - 16:51; Jackson Berezowski (4) - pp - 18:36		Second period		No scoring
No scoring		Third period		8:29 - pp - James Stefan (4)
No scoring		First overtime period		9:45 - pp - Robbie Fromm-Delorme (2)
Tyler Palmer (40 saves / 43 shots)		Goalie stats		Jan Špunar (19 saves / 21 shots)

Portland wins series 4–1

==== (W4) Prince George Cougars vs. (W5) Tri-City Americans ====
March 31	Tri-City Americans	6–4	Prince George Cougars	CN Centre	Recap
Tyson Greenway (1) - 16:45; Tyson Greenway (2) - 19:00		First period	No scoring
Parker Bell (1) - 4:15		Second period	7:20 - Caden Brown (1); 10:38 - Hudson Thornton (1)
Jake Sloan (1) - 4:46; Deagan McMillan (1) - 6:55; Jalen Luypen (1) - en - 19:17		Third period	2:03 - Caden Brown (2); 9:42 - Zac Funk (1)
Tomáš Suchánek (43 saves / 47 shots)		Goalie stats	Tyler Brennan (27 saves / 32 shots)

April 1	Tri-City Americans	1–2	OT	Prince George Cougars	CN Centre	Recap
No scoring		First period		No scoring
Cole Dubinsky (1) - 12:02		Second period		7:22 - Adam Mechura (1)
No scoring		Third period		No scoring
No scoring		First overtime period		4:52 - Jaxsen Wiebe (1)
Tomáš Suchánek (36 saves / 38 shots)		Goalie stats		Tyler Brennan (17 saves / 18 shots)

April 4	Prince George Cougars	2–4	Tri-City Americans	Toyota Center	Recap
No scoring		First period	8:00 - Marc Lajoie (1); 12:01 - Tyson Greenway (3)
Chase Wheatcroft (1) - 3:59		Second period	No scoring
Hudson Thornton (2) - 1:22		Third period	5:31 - pp - Parker Bell (2); 19:09 - en - Jalen Luypen (2)
Tyler Brennan (16 saves / 18 shots); Ty Young (8 saves / 9 shots)		Goalie stats	Tomáš Suchánek (28 saves / 30 shots)

April 5	Prince George Cougars	6–2	Tri-City Americans	Toyota Center	Recap
Koehn Ziemmer (1) - 17:55; Jaxsen Wiebe (2) - 18:54		First period	No scoring
Koehn Ziemmer (2) - 1:50		Second period	3:43 - Tyson Greenway (4)
Riley Heidt (1) - 6:02; Jaxsen Wiebe (3) - en - 17:24; Chase Wheatcroft (2) - pp - 19:59		Third period	15:45 - Jalen Luypen (3)
Ty Young (26 saves / 28 shots)		Goalie stats	Tomáš Suchánek (25 saves / 30 shots)

April 7	Prince George Cougars	6–2	Tri-City Americans	Toyota Center	Recap
No scoring		First period	Jake Sloan (2) - 14:38
5:51 - Zac Funk (2); 14:10 - Bauer Dumanski (1)		Second period	Reese Belton (1) - 16:22
8:01 - Caden Brown (3); 14:39 - Cole Dubinsky (2); 17:42 - en - Zac Funk (3); 18:48 - Bauer Dumanski (2)		Third period	No scoring
Ty Young (26 saves / 28 shots)		Goalie stats	Tomáš Suchánek (28 saves / 33 shots)

April 9	Tri-City Americans	4–5	OT	Prince George Cougars	CN Centre	Recap
12:32 - Reese Belton (2)		First period		Riley Heidt (2) - 4:51; Cole Dubinsky (3) - 7:57; Fischer O'Brien (1) - 17:05
0:17 - Ethan Ernst (1); 17:18 - Tyson Greenway (5)		Second period		No scoring
13:34 - Jake Sloan (3)		Third period		Zac Funk (4) - 2:02
No scoring		First overtime period		Chase Wheatcroft (3) - 2:31
Tomáš Suchánek (32 saves / 37 shots)		Goalie stats		Ty Young (34 saves / 38 shots)

Prince George wins series 4–2

== Conference Semi-finals ==
=== Eastern Conference ===
==== (E1) Winnipeg Ice vs. (E4) Moose Jaw Warriors ====
April 14	Moose Jaw Warriors	3–5	Winnipeg Ice	Wayne Fleming Arena	Recap
Brayden Yager (3) - 19:38		First period	1:04 - pp - Owen Pederson (2); 7:57 - Zach Benson (1); 16:42 - Matthew Savoie (7)
Maximus Wanner (2) - 4:09; Jagger Firkus (5) - pp - 13:21		Second period	No scoring
No scoring		Third period	2:59 - Connor McClennon (4); 6:04 - Graham Sward (1)
Connor Ungar (32 saves / 37 shots)		Goalie stats	Daniel Hauser (26 saves / 29 shots)

April 15	Moose Jaw Warriors	5–3	Winnipeg Ice	Wayne Fleming Arena	Recap
Ryder Korczak (2) - 1:02; Brayden Yager (4) - 8:07; Brayden Yager (5) - pp - 9:11; Martin Ryšavý (3) - pp - 9:31		First period	No scoring
No scoring		Second period	No scoring
Josh Hoekstra (1) - en - 19:57		Third period	1:07 - pp - Zack Ostapchuk (4); 13:09 - Connor McClennon (5); 16:10 - Carson Latimer (1)
Connor Ungar (33 saves / 36 shots)		Goalie stats	Daniel Hauser (7 saves / 11 shots); Mason Beaupit (8 saves / 8 shots)

April 18	Winnipeg Ice	4–8	Moose Jaw Warriors	Mosaic Place	Recap
Zack Ostapchuk (5) - 7:07; Briley Wood (2) - 7:18; Vladislav Shilo (1) - 17:06		First period	8:45 - pp - Ryder Korczak (3); 11:33 - pp - Jagger Firkus (6); 14:52 - Lynden Lakovic (2)
No scoring		Second period	10:52 - Eric Alarie (1); 11:46 - Lynden Lakovic (3)
Josh Medernach (1) - 9:55		Third period	4:14 - Cosmo Wilson (1); 9:46 - Martin Ryšavý (4); 16:01 - Jagger Firkus (7)
Daniel Hauser (5 saves / 8 shots); Mason Beaupit (12 saves / 17 shots)		Goalie stats	Connor Ungar (25 saves / 29 shots)

April 19	Winnipeg Ice	3–2	OT	Moose Jaw Warriors	Mosaic Place	Recap
Vladislav Shilo (2) - 8:22		First period		12:57 - Martin Ryšavý (5)
Matthew Savoie (8) - 0:50		Second period		No scoring
No scoring		Third period		1:22 - Jagger Firkus (8)
Zack Ostapchuk (6) - pp - 11:56		First overtime period		No scoring
Daniel Hauser (29 saves / 31 shots)		Goalie stats		Connor Ungar (38 saves / 41 shots)

April 22	Moose Jaw Warriors	2–5	Winnipeg Ice	Wayne Fleming Arena	Recap
Jagger Firkus (9) - 13:35; Brayden Yager (6) - 15:03		First period	No scoring
No scoring		Second period	2:27 - Conor Geekie (2); 11:32 - Conor Geekie (3)
No scoring		Third period	15:06 - Matthew Savoie (9); 17:50 - en - Conor Geekie (4); 19:01 - en - Zach Benson (2)
Connor Ungar (34 saves / 37 shots)		Goalie stats	Daniel Hauser (26 saves / 28 shots)

April 24	Winnipeg Ice	8–2	Moose Jaw Warriors	Mosaic Place	Recap
Zack Ostapchuk (7) - 10:49; Vladislav Shilo (3) - 11:40		First period	No scoring
Connor McClennon (6) - 0:28; Connor McClennon (7) - 2:20; Graham Sward (2) - 6:12; Conor Geekie (5) - 7:33; Conor Geekie (6) - 17:54; Evan Friesen (3) - 18:33		Second period	9:25 - pp - Denton Mateychuk (3)
No scoring		Third period	18:13 - pp - Jagger Firkus (10)
Daniel Hauser (25 saves / 27 shots)		Goalie stats	Connor Ungar (28 saves / 33 shots); Jackson Unger (4 saves / 7 shots)

Winnipeg wins series 4–2

==== (E2) Red Deer Rebels vs. (E3) Saskatoon Blades ====
April 14	Red Deer Rebels	3–1	Saskatoon Blades	SaskTel Centre	Recap
No scoring		First period	No scoring
4:28 - Jhett Larson (2)		Second period	No scoring
14:19 - Jace Isley (1); 19:56 - en - Christoffer Sedoff (3)		Third period	Jake Chiasson (3) - 18:08
Kyle Kelsey (23 saves / 24 shots)		Goalie stats	Austin Elliott (17 saves / 19 shots)

April 16	Red Deer Rebels	5–2	Saskatoon Blades	SaskTel Centre	Recap
No scoring		First period	No scoring
7:53 - pp - Ben King (4); 9:42 - Christoffer Sedoff (4); 12:10 - Jhett Larson (3)		Second period	No scoring
3:38 - Carson Birnie (1); 12:47 - Jayden Grubbe (2)		Third period	Brandon Lisowsky (2) - pp - 9:48; Charlie Wright (2) - pp - 19:54
Kyle Kelsey (14 saves / 16 shots)		Goalie stats	Austin Elliott (11 saves / 14 shots); Ethan Chadwick (4 saves / 6 shots)

April 18	Saskatoon Blades	1–3	Red Deer Rebels	Peavey Mart Centrium	Recap
5:04 - Trevor Wong (4)		First period	No scoring
No scoring		Second period	František Formánek (3) - 9:46; Dwayne Jean (1) - 9:46
No scoring		Third period	Kalan Lind (2) - en - 19:14
Austin Elliott (23 saves / 25 shots)		Goalie stats	Kyle Kelsey (22 saves / 23 shots)

April 19	Saskatoon Blades	4–2	Red Deer Rebels	Peavey Mart Centrium	Recap
No scoring		First period	Kai Uchacz (5) - pp - 6:27; Kai Uchacz (6) - 13:05
12:09 - pp - Aidan De La Gorgendiere (1)		Second period	No scoring
4:12 - Jayden Wiens (5); 4:55 - Brandon Lisowsky (3); 8:15 - Tanner Molendyk (1)		Third period	No scoring
Ethan Chadwick (34 saves / 36 shots)		Goalie stats	Kyle Kelsey (20 saves / 24 shots)

April 21	Red Deer Rebels	3–6	Saskatoon Blades	SaskTel Centre	Recap
11:08 - Kai Uchacz (7); 16:58 - Kai Uchacz (8)		First period	Tanner Molendyk (2) - 5:39; Egor Sidorov (6) - pp - 11:59; Egor Sidorov (7) - pp - 18:03
1:28 - Ollie Josephson (2)		Second period	Aidan De La Gorgendiere (2) - pp - 19:35
No scoring		Third period	Jayden Wiens (6) - 5:41; Tanner Molendyk (3) - 12:34
Kyle Kelsey (4 saves / 7 shots); Chase Coward (21 saves / 24 shots)		Goalie stats	Ethan Chadwick (14 saves / 17 shots)

April 23	Saskatoon Blades	5–3	Red Deer Rebels	Peavey Mart Centrium	Recap
0:34 - Egor Sidorov (8); 16:24 - Trevor Wong (5)		First period	Jace Isley (2) - 5:09
9:53 - pp - Egor Sidorov (9); 17:37 - Jake Chiasson (4)		Second period	Kai Uchacz (9) - 19:31
18:08 - Jayden Wiens (7)		Third period	Jace Isley (3) - 12:13
Austin Elliott (35 saves / 38 shots)		Goalie stats	Chase Coward (18 saves / 22 shots)

April 25	Red Deer Rebels	2–5	Saskatoon Blades	SaskTel Centre	Recap
12:10 - Hunter Mayo (2)		First period	Conner Roulette (2) - 14:45
7:35 - Ryker Singer (1)		Second period	Spencer Shugrue (2) - 5:41
No scoring		Third period	Spencer Shugrue (3) - 4:29; Conner Roulette (3) - 5:09; Vaughn Watterodt (4) - en - 19:32
Kyle Kelsey (23 saves / 27 shots)		Goalie stats	Austin Elliott (23 saves / 25 shots)

Saskatoon wins series 4–3

=== Western Conference ===
==== (W1) Seattle Thunderbirds vs. (W4) Prince George Cougars ====
April 14	Prince George Cougars	1–4	Seattle Thunderbirds	accesso ShoWare Center	Recap
Koehn Ziemmer (3) - pp - 18:14		First period	1:50 - Dylan Guenther (6); 15:23 - pp - Dylan Guenther (7)
No scoring		Second period	No scoring
No scoring		Third period	2:48 - Lucas Ciona (4); 19:36 - en - Nico Myatovic (1)
Ty Young (40 saves / 43 shots)		Goalie stats	Thomas Milic (23 saves / 24 shots)

April 15	Prince George Cougars	1–5	Seattle Thunderbirds	accesso ShoWare Center	Recap
No scoring		First period	13:12 - pp - Jared Davidson (2)
No scoring		Second period	9:23 - Brad Lambert (1); 13:43 - Dylan Guenther (8)
Ondřej Becher (1) - 0:14		Third period	5:53 - pp - Kyle Crnkovic (2); 19:16 - pp - Jared Davidson (3)
Ty Young (29 saves / 34 shots)		Goalie stats	Thomas Milic (26 saves / 27 shots)

April 18	Seattle Thunderbirds	8–1	Prince George Cougars	CN Centre	Recap
Reid Schaefer (2) - 1:42; Colton Dach (1) - 5:40; Jared Davidson (4) - pp - 10:42; Gracyn Sawchyn (1) - pp - 12:15		First period	No scoring
Brad Lambert (2) - 0:37; Mekai Sanders (1) - 16:03; Dylan Guenther (9) - pp - 19:05		Second period	12:10 - Chase Wheatcroft (4)
Dylan Guenther (10) - 9:51		Third period	No scoring
Thomas Milic (19 saves / 20 shots)		Goalie stats	Ty Young (32 saves / 40 shots)

April 19	Seattle Thunderbirds	8–2	Prince George Cougars	CN Centre	Recap
Sam Popowich (1) - 11:50; Jeremy Hanzel (1) - 16:00		First period	No scoring
Colton Dach (2) - 1:57; Bryce Pickford (1) - 7:41; Luke Prokop (1) - 16:24		Second period	No scoring
Mekai Sanders (2) - 5:09; Reid Schaefer (3) - pp - 7:59; Jared Davidson (5) - 9:01		Third period	0:24 - pp - Zac Funk (5); 19:28 - Chase Wheatcroft (5)
Thomas Milic (22 saves / 24 shots)		Goalie stats	Ty Young (32 saves / 40 shots)

Seattle wins series 4–0

==== (W2) Kamloops Blazers vs. (W3) Portland Winterhawks ====
April 14	Portland Winterhawks	4–6	Kamloops Blazers	Sandman Centre	Recap
James Stefan (5) - 9:50		First period	8:30 - Emmitt Finnie (4)
James Stefan (6) - 17:04		Second period	13:43 - Jakub Demek (1); 15:22 - Fraser Minten (1); 19:36 - Jakub Demek (2)
Marcus Nguyen (5) - pp - 16:48; James Stefan (7) - pp - 19:58		Third period	1:03 - Matthew Seminoff (1); 4:26 - pp - Logan Stankoven (5)
Jan Špunar (32 saves / 38 shots)		Goalie stats	Dylan Ernst (28 saves / 32 shots)

April 15	Portland Winterhawks	0–5	Kamloops Blazers	Sandman Centre	Recap
No scoring		First period	11:44 - pp - Caedan Bankier (5)
No scoring		Second period	17:34 - Olen Zellweger (4); 19:05 - pp - Logan Stankoven (6)
No scoring		Third period	7:53 - Logan Stankoven (7); 17:35 - pp - Daylan Kuefler (2)
Jan Špunar (37 saves / 42 shots)		Goalie stats	Dylan Ernst (29 saves / 29 shots)

April 19	Kamloops Blazers	3–2	Portland Winterhawks	Veterans Memorial Coliseum	Recap
Jakub Demek (3) - 9:48		First period	11:23 - pp - Jack O'Brien (3)
Logan Stankoven (8) - pp - 4:35		Second period	No scoring
Fraser Minten (2) - pp - 1:56		Third period	14:02 - Luca Cagnoni (1)
Dylan Ernst (23 saves / 25 shots)		Goalie stats	Jan Špunar (33 saves / 36 shots)

April 20	Kamloops Blazers	10–4	Portland Winterhawks	Veterans Memorial Coliseum	Recap
Matthew Seminoff (2) - pp - 0:31; Kyle Masters (1) - 9:45; Logan Stankoven (9) - pp - 10:24		First period	14:20 - pp - Ryan McCleary (1); 15:52 - Diego Buttazzoni (1)
Matthew Seminoff (3) - 2:29; Matthew Seminoff (4) - pp - 5:24; Olen Zellweger (5) - pp - 8:22; Logan Stankoven (10) - 10:23; Olen Zellweger (6) - 19:38		Second period	6:47 - Jack O'Brien (4); 17:57 - Diego Buttazzoni (2)
Olen Zellweger (7) - 1:59; 14:27 - Caedan Bankier (6) - 14:27		Third period	No scoring
Dylan Ernst (23 saves / 27 shots)		Goalie stats	Dante Giannuzzi (8 saves / 11 shots); Jan Špunar (30 saves / 37 shots)

Kamloops wins series 4–0

== Conference Finals ==
=== Eastern Conference ===
==== (E1) Winnipeg Ice vs. (E3) Saskatoon Blades ====
April 28	Saskatoon Blades	0–3	Winnipeg Ice	Wayne Fleming Arena	Recap
No scoring		First period	14:39 - Ben Zloty (1); 16:05 - sh - ps - Zack Ostapchuk (8)
No scoring		Second period	7:45 - Carson Lambos (1)
No scoring		Third period	No scoring
Ethan Chadwick (25 saves / 28 shots)		Goalie stats	Daniel Hauser (16 saves / 16 shots)

April 29	Saskatoon Blades	2–6	Winnipeg Ice	Wayne Fleming Arena	Recap
No scoring		First period	6:09 - Connor McClennon (8); 17:31 - pp - Connor McClennon (9)
No scoring		Second period	3:25 - Zach Benson (3); 12:29 - Owen Pederson (3)
Justin Lies (2) - 10:48; Jayden Wiens (8) - pp - 14:39		Third period	1:08 - Connor McClennon (10); 16:27 - en - Matthew Savoie (10)
Austin Elliott (27 saves /32 shots)		Goalie stats	Daniel Hauser (27 saves / 29 shots)

May 2	Winnipeg Ice	5–1	Saskatoon Blades	SaskTel Centre	Recap
Matthew Savoie (11) - pp - 2:46; Zach Benson (4) - 9:48; Evan Friesen (4) - 10:33		First period	No scoring
Connor McClennon (11) - pp - 1:13		Second period	5:40 - Justin Lies (3)
Owen Pederson (4) - pp - 19:26		Third period	No scoring
Daniel Hauser (17 saves / 18 shots)		Goalie stats	Ethan Chadwick (20 saves / 24 shots); Austin Elliott (9 saves / 10 shots)

May 3	Winnipeg Ice	3–2	Saskatoon Blades	SaskTel Centre	Recap
Connor McClennon (12) - pp - 18:08		First period	15:08 - Aidan De La Gorgendiere (3)
Connor McClennon (13) - 13:30		Second period	No scoring
Briley Wood (3) - 6:19		Third period	2:45 - Trevor Wong (6)
Daniel Hauser (16 saves / 18 shots)		Goalie stats	Austin Elliott (33 saves / 36 shots)

Winnipeg wins series 4–0

=== Western Conference ===
==== (W1) Seattle Thunderbirds vs. (W2) Kamloops Blazers ====
April 29	Kamloops Blazers	1–5	Seattle Thunderbirds	accesso ShoWare Center	Recap
No scoring		First period	17:00 - Jared Davidson (6)
Olen Zellweger (8) - 16:11		Second period	13:44 - Nico Myatovic (2)
No scoring		Third period	10:19 - Dylan Guenther (11); 14:21 - Jared Davidson (7); 16:13 - pp - Gracyn Sawchyn (2)
Dylan Ernst (30 saves / 35 shots)		Goalie stats	Thomas Milic (24 saves / 25 shots)

April 30	Kamloops Blazers	3–4	OT	Seattle Thunderbirds	accesso ShoWare Center	Recap
Caedan Bankier (7) - 19:20		First period		No scoring
Olen Zellweger (9) - pp - 0:59; Matthew Seminoff (5) - pp - 12:53		Second period		7:33 - pp - Lucas Ciona (5); 15:56 - Colton Dach (3)
No scoring		Third period		2:04 - Brad Lambert (3)
No scoring		First overtime period		6:21 - Jeremy Hanzel (2)
Dylan Ernst (35 saves / 39 shots)		Goalie stats		Thomas Milic (39 saves / 42 shots)

May 2	Seattle Thunderbirds	1–4	Kamloops Blazers	Sandman Centre	Recap
Nolan Allan (2) - 10:00		First period	8:29 - pp - Daylan Kuefler (3); 17:43 - Jakub Demek (4)
No scoring		Second period	No scoring
No scoring		Third period	18:53 - en - Ryan Hofer (6); 19:18 - Matthew Seminoff (6)
Thomas Milic (35 saves / 38 shots)		Goalie stats	Dylan Ernst (22 saves / 23 shots)

May 4	Seattle Thunderbirds	8–4	Kamloops Blazers	Sandman Centre	Recap
Dylan Guenther (12) - 3:09; Kevin Korchinski (1) - 11:48; Dylan Guenther (13) - 19:58		First period	18:53 - pp - Matthew Seminoff (7)
Kyle Crnkovic (3) - 13:32		Second period	1:12 - Olen Zellweger (10); 11:21 - Olen Zellweger (11)
Jared Davidson (8) - 5:36; Bryce Pickford (2) - 8:13; Dylan Guenther (14) - 14:19; Reid Schaefer (4) - en - 14:56		Third period	12:01 - Dylan Sydor (3)
Thomas Milic (36 saves / 40 shots)		Goalie stats	Dylan Ernst (33 saves / 40 shots)

May 6	Kamloops Blazers	4–2	Seattle Thunderbirds	accesso ShoWare Center	Recap
No scoring		First period	No scoring
Matthew Seminoff (8) - 16:00		Second period	6:25 - Jared Davidson (9)
Matthew Seminoff (9) - 0:43; Ryan Hofer (7) - 1:06; Ryan Hofer (8) - sh - 5:31		Third period	5:48 - pp - Reid Schaefer (5)
Dylan Ernst (36 saves / 38 shots)		Goalie stats	Thomas Milic (26 saves / 30 shots)

May 8	Seattle Thunderbirds	4–2	Kamloops Blazers	Sandman Centre	Recap
No scoring		First period	15:57 - Dylan Sydor (4)
Jared Davidson (10) - 4:46		Second period	No scoring
Sawyer Mynio (1) - 5:33; Kyle Crnkovic (4) - 10:00; Reid Schaefer (6) - en - 19:21		Third period	18:17 - pp - Matthew Seminoff (10)
Thomas Milic (28 saves / 30 shots)		Goalie stats	Dylan Ernst (39 saves / 42 shots)

Seattle wins series 4–2

== WHL Championship ==
=== (E1) Winnipeg Ice vs. (W1) Seattle Thunderbirds ===
May 12	Seattle Thunderbirds	2–3	Winnipeg Ice	Canada Life Centre	Recap
No scoring		First period	9:13 - pp - Connor McClennon (14); 15:22 - Evan Friesen (5)
No scoring		Second period	7:02 - Carson Latimer (2)
Reid Schaefer (7) - 0:28; Kevin Korchinski (2) - 18:18		Third period	No scoring
Thomas Milic (25 saves / 28 shots)		Goalie stats	Daniel Hauser (27 saves / 29 shots)

May 13	Seattle Thunderbirds	4–2	Winnipeg Ice	Canada Life Centre	Recap
No scoring		First period	4:11 - Zach Benson (5)
Jeremy Hanzel (3) - 1:24		Second period	No scoring
Brad Lambert (4) - 5:02; Reid Schaefer (8) - 5:10; Brad Lambert (5) - 17:14		Third period	8:27 - Zach Benson (6)
Thomas Milic (29 saves / 31 shots)		Goalie stats	Daniel Hauser (35 saves / 39 shots)

May 16	Winnipeg Ice	3–6	Seattle Thunderbirds	accesso ShoWare Center	Recap
Carson Latimer (3) - 1:27		First period	0:25 - Kyle Crnkovic (5); 13:24 - pp - Jeremy Hanzel (4); 13:47 - Brad Lambert (6); 14:09 - Jared Davidson (11)
Zach Benson (7) - 13:42		Second period	8:09 - pp - Dylan Guenther (15); 18:25 - Jeremy Hanzel (5)
Zack Ostapchuk (9) - pp - 12:12		Third period	No scoring
Daniel Hauser (16 saves / 22 shots); Mason Beaupit (11 saves / 11 shots)		Goalie stats	Thomas Milic (35 saves / 38 shots)

May 17	Winnipeg Ice	2–4	Seattle Thunderbirds	accesso ShoWare Center	Recap
Carson Latimer (4) - 16:25		First period	19:43 - Kevin Korchinski (3)
Evan Friesen (6) - 8:33		Second period	4:31 - pp - Gracyn Sawchyn (3)
No scoring		Third period	7:47 - Dylan Guenther (16); 19:52 - en - Nico Myatovic (3)
Daniel Hauser (33 saves / 36 shots)		Goalie stats	Thomas Milic (31 saves / 33 shots)

May 19	Winnipeg Ice	1–3	Seattle Thunderbirds	accesso ShoWare Center	Recap
No scoring		First period	No scoring
No scoring		Second period	Sam Popowich (2) - 13:45
5:02 - Evan Friesen (7)		Third period	Nico Myatovic (4) - ps - 2:27; Kyle Crnkovic (6) - en - 18:54
Daniel Hauser (35 saves / 37 shots)		Goalie stats	Thomas Milic (30 saves / 31 shots)

Seattle wins series 4–1

== Playoff scoring leaders ==
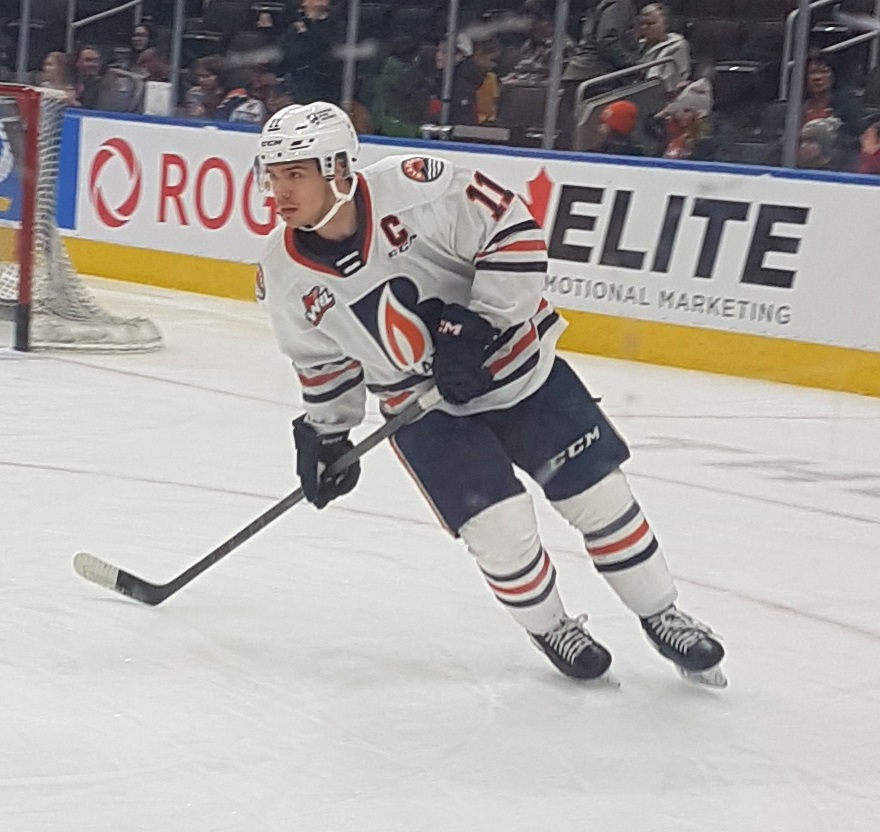
Logan Stankoven led the playoffs in scoring with 30 points in 14 games

Note: GP = Games played; G = Goals; A = Assists; Pts = Points; PIM = Penalty minutes

Player	Team	GP	G	A	Pts	PIM
Logan Stankoven	Kamloops Blazers	14	10	20	30	4
Olen Zellweger	Kamloops Blazers	14	11	18	29	10
Matthew Savoie	Winnipeg Ice	19	11	18	29	8
Dylan Guenther	Seattle Thunderbirds	19	16	12	28	12
Brad Lambert	Seattle Thunderbirds	17	6	20	26	8
Ben Zloty	Winnipeg Ice	19	1	23	24	2
Connor McClennon	Winnipeg Ice	19	14	9	23	15
Jared Davidson	Seattle Thunderbirds	19	11	12	23	17
Jeremy Hanzel	Seattle Thunderbirds	19	5	17	22	18
Jagger Firkus	Moose Jaw Warriors	10	10	11	21	10

== Playoff leading goaltenders ==
Note: GP = Games played; Mins = Minutes played; W = Wins; L = Losses; GA = Goals Allowed; SO = Shutouts; SV& = Save percentage; GAA = Goals against average

Player	Team	GP	Mins	W	L	GA	SO	Sv%	GAA
Thomas Milic	Seattle Thunderbirds	19	1,141	16	3	37	1	0.933	1.95
Kyle Kelsey	Red Deer Rebels	11	636	7	3	25	1	0.912	2.36
Dylan Ernst	Kamloops Blazers	14	863	10	4	37	3	0.913	2.57
Daniel Hauser	Winnipeg Ice	19	1,042	13	5	47	1	0.906	2.71
Connor Ungar	Moose Jaw Warriors	10	635	6	4	29	0	0.915	2.74

== WHL awards ==
Scotty Munro Memorial Trophy	Regular season champions	Winnipeg Ice
Four Broncos Memorial Trophy	Player of the Year	Connor Bedard, Regina Pats
Bob Clarke Trophy	Top Scorer	Connor Bedard, Regina Pats
Bill Hunter Memorial Trophy	Top Defenceman	Olen Zellweger, Kamloops Blazers
Jim Piggott Memorial Trophy	Rookie of the Year	Ryder Ritchie, Prince Albert Raiders
Del Wilson Trophy	Top Goaltender	Thomas Milic, Seattle Thunderbirds
WHL Plus-Minus Award	Top Plus-Minus Rating	Jeremy Hanzel, Seattle Thunderbirds
Brad Hornung Trophy	Most Sportsmanlike Player	Brayden Yager, Moose Jaw Warriors
Daryl K. (Doc) Seaman Trophy	Scholastic player of the Year	Quinn Mantei, Brandon Wheat Kings
Jim Donlevy Memorial Trophy	Scholastic team of the Year	Portland Winterhawks
Dunc McCallum Memorial Trophy	Coach of the Year	Brennan Sonne, Saskatoon Blades
Lloyd Saunders Memorial Trophy	Executive of the Year	Bil La Forge, Seattle Thunderbirds
Allen Paradice Memorial Trophy	Top Official	Chris Crich
St. Clair Group Trophy	Marketing/Public Relations Award	Spokane Chiefs
Doug Wickenheiser Memorial Trophy	Humanitarian of the Year	Logan Stankoven, Kamloops Blazers
WHL Playoff MVP	WHL Finals Most Valuable Player	Thomas Millic, Seattle Thunderbirds
Professional Hockey Achievement; Academic Recipient	Alumni Achievement Awards	Mark Recchi

=== All-Star teams ===
==== Central Division ====
First Team		Pos.	Second Team	
Player	Team	Pos.	Player	Team
Rhett Stoesser	Red Deer Rebels	G	Harrison Meneghin	Lethbridge Hurricanes
Owen Pickering	Swift Current Broncos	D	Dru Krebs	Medicine Hat Tigers
Christoffer Sedoff	Red Deer Rebels	D	Carter Yakemchuk	Calgary Hitmen
Riley Fiddler-Schultz	Calgary Hitmen	F	Jayden Grubbe	Red Deer Rebels
Josh Filmon	Swift Current Broncos	F	Mathew Ward	Swift Current Broncos
Kai Uchacz	Red Deer Rebels	F	Oazis Wiesblatt	Medicine Hat Tigers

==== East Division ====
First Team		Pos.	Second Team	
Player	Team	Pos.	Player	Team
Daniel Hauser	Winnipeg Ice	G	Austin Elliott	Saskatoon Blades
Stanislav Svozil	Regina Pats	D	Aidan De La Gorgendiere	Saskatoon Blades
Ben Zloty	Winnipeg Ice	D	Landon Kosior	Prince Albert Raiders
Connor Bedard	Regina Pats	F	Nate Danielson	Brandon Wheat Kings
Zach Benson	Winnipeg Ice	F	Matthew Savoie	Winnipeg Ice
Connor McClennon	Winnipeg Ice	F	Trevor Wong	Saskatoon Blades

==== B.C. Division ====
First Team		Pos.	Second Team	
Player	Team	Pos.	Player	Team
Jesper Vikman	Vancouver Giants	G	Dylan Ernst	Kamloops Blazers
Ethan Samson	Prince George Cougars	D	Kyle Masters	Kamloops Blazers
Olen Zellweger	Kamloops Blazers	D	Hudson Thornton	Prince George Cougars
Andrew Cristall	Kelowna Rockets	F	Caedan Bankier	Kamloops Blazers
Logan Stankoven	Kamloops Blazers	F	Riley Heidt	Prince George Cougars
Chase Wheatcroft	Prince George Cougars	F	Matthew Seminoff	Kamloops Blazers

==== U.S. Division ====
First Team		Pos.	Second Team	
Player	Team	Pos.	Player	Team
Thomas Milic	Seattle Thunderbirds	G	Tomas Suchanek	Tri-City Americans
Lukas Dragicevic	Tri-City Americans	D	Nolan Allan	Seattle Thunderbirds
Kevin Korchinski	Seattle Thunderbirds	D	Luca Cagnoni	Portland Winterhawks
Jackson Berezowski	Everett Silvertips	F	Chase Bertholet	Spokane Chiefs
Jared Davidson	Seattle Thunderbirds	F	Lucas Ciona	Seattle Thunderbirds
Gabe Klassen	Portland Winterhawks	F	Austin Roest	Everett Silvertips

== Attendance ==
Team	Home average
Edmonton	6,500
Spokane	5,842
Everett	5,839
Kamloops	4,902
Calgary	4,874
Portland	4,508
Saskatoon	4,506
Regina	4,500
Seattle	4,342
Kelowna	4,304
Red Deer	4,163
Victoria	3,559
Lethbridge	3,525
Tri-City	3,510
Vancouver	3,462
Brandon	3,178
Moose Jaw	2,883
Prince George	2,755
Medicine Hat	2,651
Prince Albert	2,392
Swift Current	1,837
Winnipeg	1,649
Total Average	3,895
Total	2,913,612
total games	748

=== Playoffs ===
Home team	Home games	Average attendance	Total attendance
Saskatoon Blades	10	8,780	87,801
Regina Pats	3	6,499	19,497
Kamloops Blazers	7	5,173	36,216
Red Deer Rebels	6	5,062	30,375
Seattle Thunderbirds	10	4,867	48,677
Prince George Cougars	5	4,609	23,046
Everett Silvertips	2	3,946	7,892
Portland Winterhawks	5	3,891	19,455
Kelowna Rockets	2	3,456	6,912
Medicine Hat Tigers	2	3,239	6,479
Calgary Hitmen	2	3,217	6,434
Moose Jaw Warriors	5	3,210	16,051
Lethbridge Hurricanes	2	2,953	5,906
Vancouver Giants	2	2,909	5,818
Tri-City Americans	3	2,750	8,251
Winnipeg Ice	9	2,536	22,827
League	75	4,701	352,637

== See also ==
- List of WHL seasons
- 2022–23 OHL season
- 2022–23 QMJHL season

Preceded by 2021–22	WHL seasons 2022–23	Succeeded by 2023–24
