= Stanislav Svozil =

Czech ice hockey player (born 2003)

- Born: 17 January 2003 (age 23) Přerov, Czech Republic
- Height: 6 ft 0 in (183 cm)
- Weight: 181 lb (82 kg; 12 st 13 lb)
- Position: Defense
- Shoots: Left
- ELH team Former teams: HC Kometa Brno; Columbus Blue Jackets
- NHL draft: 69th overall, 2021; Columbus Blue Jackets
- Playing career: 2019–present

Stanislav Svozil (born 17 January 2003) is a Czech professional ice hockey defenseman for HC Kometa Brno in the Czech Extraliga (ELH).

== Playing career ==
Svozil played as a youth in his native Czech Republic, with hometown club HC Přerov before transferring to HC Kometa Brno. He made his professional debut in the Czech Extraliga with Brno during the 2019–20 season.

Following his second season with Kometa Brno, Svozil was selected by the Columbus Blue Jackets in the third-round, 69th overall, of the 2021 NHL entry draft. He was signed in the summer to a three-year, entry-level contract with the Blue Jackets on 14 August 2021.

After four seasons playing within the Blue Jackets organization, Svozil as a restricted free agent opted to return to his homeland with original club, HC Kometa Brno of the ELH, agreeing to a two-year contract on 3 June 2026.

== Career statistics ==
=== Regular season and playoffs ===
| | | | Regular season | | | | | Playoffs |
| Season | Team | League | GP | G | A | Pts | PIM | GP | G | A | Pts | PIM |
|---|---|---|---|---|---|---|---|---|---|---|---|---|
| 2019–20 | HC Kometa Brno | ELH | 41 | 2 | 3 | 5 | 8 | — | — | — | — | — |
| 2020–21 | HC Kometa Brno | ELH | 30 | 1 | 2 | 3 | 8 | 8 | 0 | 0 | 0 | 8 |
| 2020–21 | HC Přerov | Czech.1 | 3 | 1 | 1 | 2 | 2 | — | — | — | — | — |
| 2021–22 | Regina Pats | WHL | 59 | 10 | 31 | 41 | 23 | — | — | — | — | — |
| 2022–23 | Regina Pats | WHL | 56 | 11 | 67 | 78 | 24 | 7 | 4 | 9 | 13 | 0 |
| 2022–23 | Columbus Blue Jackets | NHL | 2 | 0 | 1 | 1 | 2 | — | — | — | — | — |
| 2022–23 | Cleveland Monsters | AHL | 1 | 0 | 2 | 2 | 0 | — | — | — | — | — |
| 2023–24 | Cleveland Monsters | AHL | 57 | 5 | 18 | 23 | 24 | 14 | 0 | 3 | 3 | 12 |
| 2024–25 | Cleveland Monsters | AHL | 63 | 4 | 20 | 24 | 42 | 6 | 0 | 1 | 1 | 0 |
| 2025–26 | Cleveland Monsters | AHL | 41 | 1 | 6 | 7 | 20 | 9 | 0 | 3 | 3 | 6 |
| ELH totals | | | 71 | 3 | 5 | 8 | 16 | 8 | 0 | 0 | 0 | 8 |
| NHL totals | | | 2 | 0 | 1 | 1 | 2 | — | — | — | — | — |

Medal record

Representing Czech Republic

Ice hockey

World Junior Championships
| Silver medal – second place | 2023 Canada | |

=== International ===
| Year | Team | Event | Result | GP | G | A | Pts | PIM |
|---|---|---|---|---|---|---|---|---|
| 2019 | Czech Republic | HG18 | 5th | 4 | 0 | 0 | 0 | 6 |
| 2019 | Czech Republic | U17 | 3rd place, bronze medalist(s) | 6 | 0 | 4 | 4 | 4 |
| 2021 | Czech Republic | WJC | 7th | 5 | 0 | 1 | 1 | 16 |
| 2021 | Czech Republic | U18 | 7th | 5 | 0 | 1 | 1 | 6 |
| 2022 | Czech Republic | WJC | 4th | 6 | 1 | 2 | 3 | 29 |
| 2023 | Czechia | WJC | 2nd place, silver medalist(s) | 7 | 1 | 7 | 8 | 0 |
| Junior totals | | | | 33 | 2 | 15 | 17 | 61 |

== Awards and honours ==
| Award | Year |
ELH
| Rookie of the Year | 2020 |
WHL
| East First All-Star Team | 2023 |
| CHL Third All-Star Team | 2023 |
