= Olen Zellweger =

Canadian ice hockey player (born 2003)

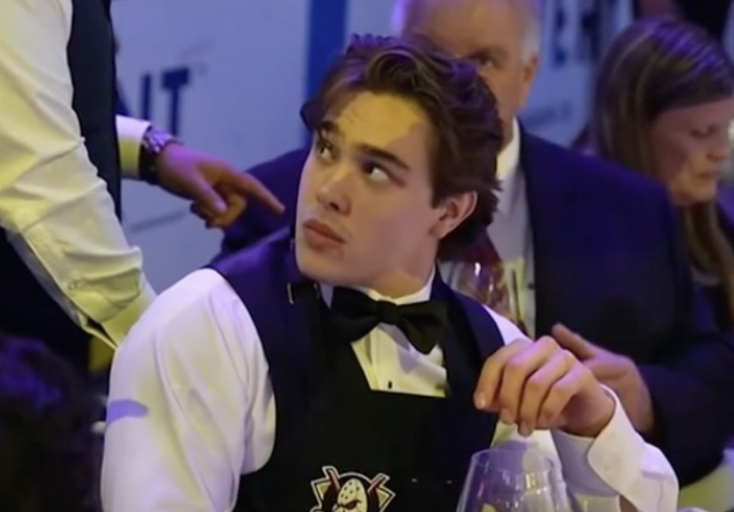
- Zellweger in 2025
- Born: September 10, 2003 (age 23) Calgary, Alberta, Canada
- Height: 5 ft 9 in (175 cm)
- Weight: 174 lb (79 kg; 12 st 6 lb)
- Position: Defence
- Shoots: Left
- NHL team Former teams: Buffalo Sabres; Anaheim Ducks
- National team: Canada
- NHL draft: 34th overall, 2021; Anaheim Ducks

Olen Andre Zellweger (born September 10, 2003) is a Canadian professional ice hockey player who is a defenceman for the Buffalo Sabres of the National Hockey League (NHL). He was drafted in the second round, 34th overall, by the Anaheim Ducks in the 2021 NHL entry draft.

== Early life ==
Although Zellweger was born in Calgary, he was raised in Bonnyville, Alberta. He won an Atom (Under-11 Age Division) AA championship on the Bonnyville Pontiacs.

== Playing career ==
Zellweger was selected by the Everett Silvertips of the Western Hockey League (WHL) in the second round of the 2018 prospect draft. He made his debut with the Silvertips at the age of 16 during the 2019–20 season. He played in 148 games for Everett registering 28 goals and 103 assists. He won the Bill Hunter Memorial Trophy as WHL defenceman of the year in 2021–22, marking the first time a Silvertips player won that trophy.

=== Anaheim Ducks (2021–2026) ===
Zellweger was drafted by the Anaheim Ducks of the National Hockey League (NHL) in the second round, 34th overall, of the 2021 NHL entry draft. Zellweger signed a three-year entry-level contract with the Ducks on August 13, 2021. Later that season he would make his professional debut with the San Diego Gulls, the American Hockey League (AHL) affiliate of the Ducks, playing a single playoff game and recording one assist.

For the 2022–23 season, Zellweger returned to the Everett Silvertips of the WHL. On January 8, 2023, Zellweger, along with Ryan Hofer were traded to the Memorial Cup hosting Kamloops Blazers in exchange for four players and ten draft picks. Though the Blazers were eliminated from the Memorial Cup, Zellweger was named to the tournament's all-star team. He would go on to win his second Bill Hunter Memorial Trophy at the end of the year, the sixth Blazer to win the trophy. He was named to the Canadian Hockey League's (CHL) First All-Star team alongside Blazers' teammate Logan Stankoven, and CHL Defenceman of the Year.

For the 2023–24 season, Zellweger again joined the San Diego Gulls, where he was named to the AHL All-Star Game. On January 23, 2024, Zellweger was called up to the Anaheim Ducks. He made his debut that night recording one assist in a win over the Buffalo Sabres. After four games, he was sent back to San Diego, where he represented the team at the 2024 AHL All-Star Classic. Zellweger was recalled again by Anaheim on March 1 and was leading all AHL rookie defencemen in goals, points and tied for the lead in assists and was third overall in overall rookie scoring, with 12 goals, 25 assists for 37 points in 44 games with San Diego. He scored his first NHL goal on March 31 beating goaltender Artūrs Šilovs of the Vancouver Canucks. He finished the season with Anaheim, scoring two goals and nine points in 26 games.

During the 2026 Stanley Cup playoffs, Zellweger scored his first playoff goal late in the third period of Game 5 of the Ducks' second round series against the Vegas Golden Knights, tying the game at 2–2.

=== Buffalo Sabres (2026–present) ===
On June 26, 2026, Zellweger was traded by the Ducks to the Buffalo Sabres in exchange for a second-round pick in the 2026 NHL entry draft and forward Anton Wahlberg. As a pending restricted free agent, he signed a three-year, $9.3 million extension with the Sabres on July 1.

== International play ==
Medal record

Representing Canada

Men's ice hockey

World Junior Championships
Gold medal – first place	2022 Canada	
Gold medal – first place	2023 Canada	

World U18 Championships
Gold medal – first place	2021 United States	

Zellweger made his international debut for Canada with the national under-18 team at the 2021 IIHF World U18 Championships. He registered eight points in Team Canada's seven-game tournament, which saw them defeat Russia for the gold medal.

Six months later, Zellweger was selected to play for the national junior team at the initial 2022 World Junior Ice Hockey Championships that took place beginning in December 2021. However, due to the COVID-19 pandemic, the tournament was postponed until August, with all individual statistics retained but the team results erased. In the new tournament in August 2022, Zellweger played an important role in Team Canada's gold medal win, and was named to the tournament's All-Star Team. He rejoined Team Canada for the 2023 World Junior Ice Hockey Championships, which saw the national team win its twentieth World Junior gold.

Following the conclusion of the 2023–24 NHL season, Zellweger accepted an invitation to make his senior national team debut at the 2024 IIHF World Championship.

== Career statistics ==
=== Regular season and playoffs ===
			Regular season					Playoffs
Season	Team	League	GP	G	A	Pts	PIM	GP	G	A	Pts	PIM
2018–19	Everett Silvertips	WHL	1	0	0	0	0	—	—	—	—	—
2019–20	Everett Silvertips	WHL	58	2	10	12	8	—	—	—	—	—
2020–21	Everett Silvertips	WHL	11	2	11	13	2	—	—	—	—	—
2021–22	Everett Silvertips	WHL	55	14	64	78	23	6	2	7	9	4
2021–22	San Diego Gulls	AHL	—	—	—	—	—	1	0	1	1	0
2022–23	Everett Silvertips	WHL	23	10	18	28	12	—	—	—	—	—
2022–23	Kamloops Blazers	WHL	32	22	30	52	28	14	11	18	29	10
2023–24	San Diego Gulls	AHL	44	12	25	37	16	—	—	—	—	—
2023–24	Anaheim Ducks	NHL	26	2	7	9	4	—	—	—	—	—
2024–25	Anaheim Ducks	NHL	62	7	13	20	20	—	—	—	—	—
2025–26	Anaheim Ducks	NHL	76	7	15	22	34	3	1	1	2	0
NHL totals			164	16	35	51	58	3	1	1	2	0

=== International ===
Year	Team	Event	Result	GP	G	A	Pts	PIM
2019	Canada Red	U17	5th	5	0	2	2	2
2021	Canada	U18	1st place, gold medalist(s)	7	1	7	8	2
2022	Canada	WJC	1st place, gold medalist(s)	7	2	9	11	2
2023	Canada	WJC	1st place, gold medalist(s)	7	0	6	6	4
2024	Canada	WC	4th	10	0	5	5	2
Junior totals				26	3	24	27	10
Senior totals				10	0	5	5	2

== Awards and honours ==
Award	Year	Ref
CHL
CHL Defenceman of the Year	2023	
First All-Star Team	2023	
Memorial Cup All-Star Team	2023	
WHL
Bill Hunter Memorial Trophy	2022, 2023	
US First All-Star Team	2022	
BC First All-Star Team	2023	
International
World Junior Championship Media All-Star Team	2022	
