= Kai Uchacz =

Canadian ice hockey player (born 2003)

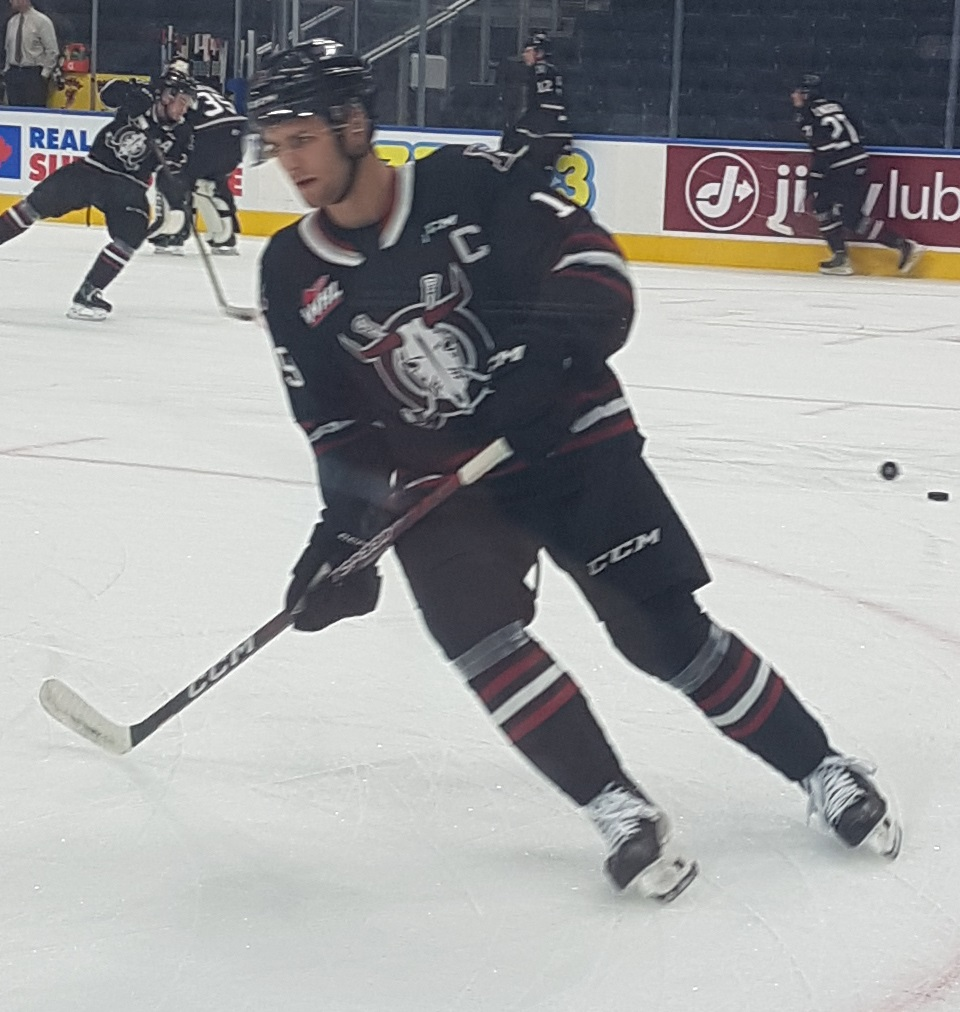
- Born: June 24, 2003 (age 23) Calgary, Alberta, Canada
- Height: 6 ft 2 in (188 cm)
- Weight: 206 lb (93 kg; 14 st 10 lb)
- Position: Centre
- Shoots: Right
- NHL team (P) Cur. team: Vegas Golden Knights; Henderson Silver Knights (AHL)
- NHL draft: Undrafted
- Playing career: 2024–present

Kai Uchacz (born June 24, 2003) is a Canadian professional ice hockey player who is a centre for the Henderson Silver Knights of the American Hockey League (AHL) as a prospect for the Vegas Golden Knights of the National Hockey League (NHL).

== Playing career ==
Uchacz played youth hockey in Okotoks, Alberta with the Okotoks Oilers U15AAA and U18AAA teams. He would be drafted tenth overall in the 2018 WHL Draft by the Seattle Thunderbirds, and played for Team Alberta at the 2019 Canada Winter Games. After a racist incident where Uchacz and a teammate bullied a black teammate, Uchacz was removed from the Thunderbirds' roster for the 2020–21 season. Uchacz's rights would later be traded to the Red Deer Rebels for a second-round bantam draft choice. After leading the Rebels in scoring in the previous season, Uchacz would be named captain of the Rebels for the 2023–24 season.

After attending development camp with the Vegas Golden Knights of the National Hockey League (NHL) in the summer of 2024, Uchacz began his professional career in signing a one-year contract with Vegas' American Hockey League (AHL) affiliate, the Henderson Silver Knights, on July 9, 2024. In the midst of what would ultimately be a 30 point (15 G, 15 A) in a 68 game rookie season in the 2024–25 season, Uchacz would sign a two-year entry-level contract with the Golden Knights on March 2, 2025. The following season, after an injury to Jonas Røndbjerg, Uchacz was called up to the Golden Knights on February 3, 2026. Uchacz would make his NHL debut the following day against the Vancouver Canucks, playing 11:49 and recording five hits.

== Personal life ==
=== Bullying incident ===
After a racist incident where Uchacz and a teammate bullied their lone black teammate, Mekai Sanders, they were removed from the Seattle Thunderbirds roster for the 2020-21 season.

== Career statistics ==
=== Regular season and playoffs ===
			Regular season					Playoffs
Season	Team	League	GP	G	A	Pts	PIM	GP	G	A	Pts	PIM
2018–19	Seattle Thunderbirds	WHL	5	1	1	2	0	1	0	0	0	0
2019–20	Seattle Thunderbirds	WHL	52	2	6	8	34	—	—	—	—	—
2020–21	Spruce Grove Saints	AJHL	3	0	1	1	0	—	—	—	—	—
2021–22	Red Deer Rebels	WHL	52	14	19	33	39	10	2	2	4	6
2022–23	Red Deer Rebels	WHL	68	50	35	85	75	12	5	9	14	10
2023–24	Red Deer Rebels	OHL	68	42	39	81	66	9	2	3	5	4
2024–25	Henderson Silver Knights	AHL	68	15	15	30	75	—	—	—	—	—
2025–26	Henderson Silver Knights	AHL	68	20	31	51	52	6	0	2	2	12
2025–26	Vegas Golden Knights	NHL	3	0	0	0	5	—	—	—	—	—
NHL totals			3	0	0	0	5	—	—	—	—	—
