= Zack Ostapchuk =

Canadian ice hockey player (born 2003)

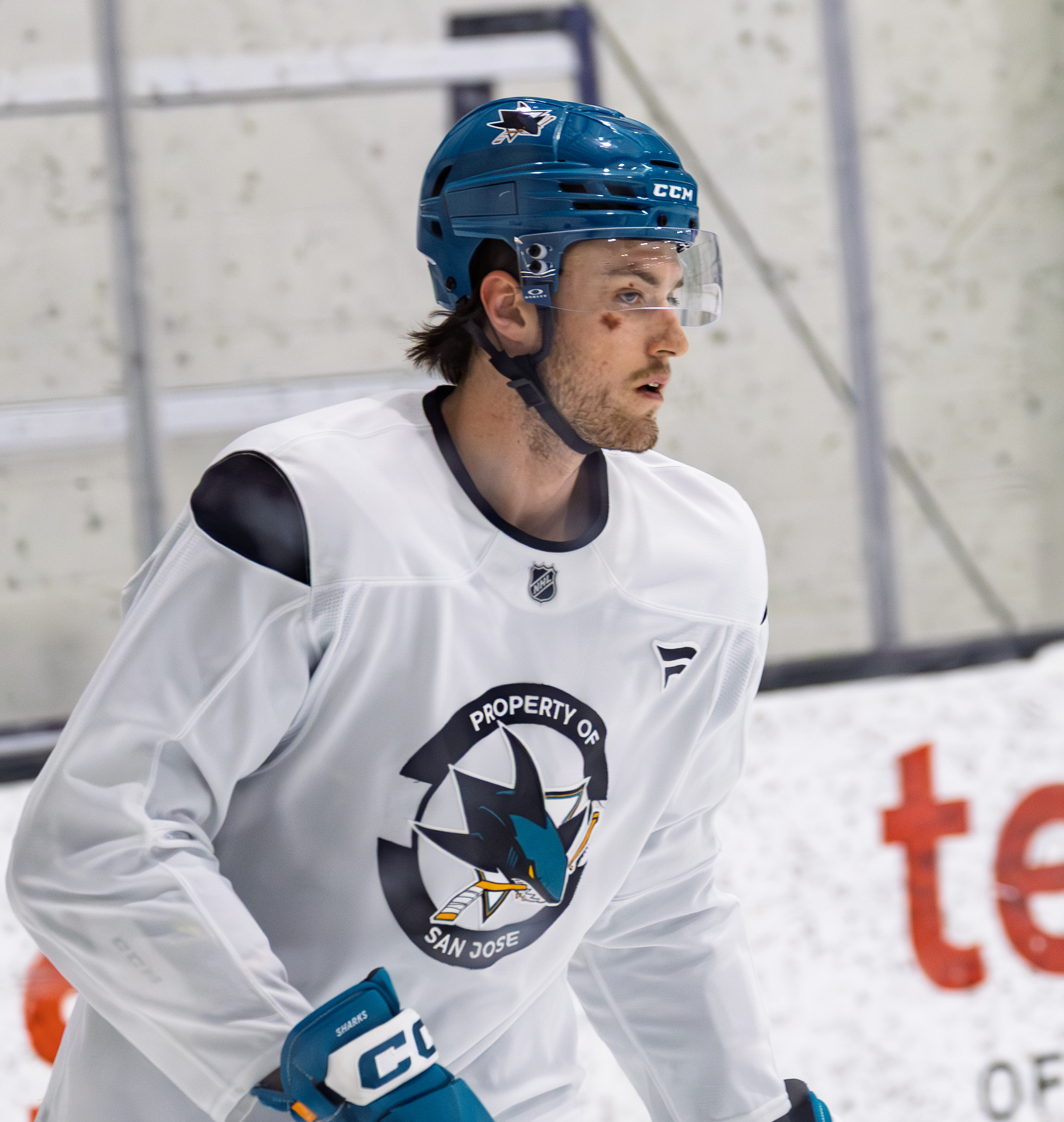
- Ostapchuk with the San Jose Sharks in April 2026
- Born: May 29, 2003 (age 23) St. Albert, Alberta, Canada
- Height: 6 ft 4 in (193 cm)
- Weight: 215 lb (98 kg; 15 st 5 lb)
- Position: Forward
- Shoots: Left
- NHL team Former teams: San Jose Sharks; Ottawa Senators
- NHL draft: 39th overall, 2021; Ottawa Senators
- Playing career: 2023–present

Zack Ostapchuk (born May 29, 2003) is a Canadian professional ice hockey player who is a forward for the San Jose Sharks in the National Hockey League (NHL). Ostapchuk previously played for the Ottawa Senators of the NHL, who drafted him 39th overall in the 2021 NHL entry draft.

== Early life ==
Ostapchuk, is the only child of Charlene and Dennis Ostapchuk from St. Albert, Alberta and his father passed in 2017 before he turned 14.

== Playing career ==
=== Amateur ===
Ostapchuk was selected by the Vancouver Giants of the Western Hockey League (WHL) in the first round, 12th overall, in the 2018 WHL draft. He made his major junior hockey debut with the Giants in the 2018–19 season, appearing in six games, going scoreless. The Giants qualified for the 2019 WHL playoffs and advanced to the league finals, losing to the Prince Albert Raiders. Ostapchuk made two playoff appearances, going scoreless. He played in 44 games, scoring five goals and three assists for eight points. His season ended early, after he suffered a knee injury, missing the final 18 games, before the season was cancelled by the WHL due to the COVID-19 pandemic. In the pandemic-shortened 2020–21 season, Ostapchuk played in 22 games for the Giants, scoring seven goals and 16 points.

In his first full season in 2021–22, Ostapchuk scored 26 goals and 43 points in 60 games. However, the Giants were playing poorly and they traded away their captain, Justin Sourdif, at the 2022 WHL trade deadline in January 2022. Ostapchuk was named the team's new captain in March 2022. The team turned around their fortunes and made the playoffs in the eighth and final spot, where they surprised the league's number one team, the Everett Silvertips in the first round. They then lost to the Kamloops Blazers in the second round. Ostapchuk played in 12 playoff games, scoring seven goals and 23 points.

He returned to the Giants for his final season of junior in 2022–23. He appeared in 21 games, scoring 10 goals and 29 points, however, the Giants were mediocre and management considered themselves unable to compete with the powerhouses in the league that season. The Giants traded Ostaphuck on January 8, 2023, to the Winnipeg Ice, the top team in the WHL, for four players and four draft picks. He added 21 goals and 38 goals in 34 games with the Ice as they qualified for the 2023 playoffs. The Ice advanced to the WHL championship finals, facing the Seattle Thunderbirds. Winnipeg was eliminated in five games of their best-of-seven series. Ostapchuk made 18 playoff appearances, scoring nine goals and 15 points.

=== Professional ===
Ostapchuk was selected by the Ottawa Senators of the National Hockey League (NHL) in the second round, 39th overall, of the 2021 NHL entry draft. He signed a three-year entry-level contract with the Senators on September 29, 2021. He was assigned to Ottawa's American Hockey League (AHL) affiliate, the Belleville Senators to begin the 2023–24 season. On March 12, 2024, Ostapchuk was called up to Ottawa after an injury to Rourke Chartier and he made his NHL debut later that day against the Pittsburgh Penguins. He went scoreless in seven games with the Senators and recorded 28 points in 69 games with Belleville.

Ostapchuk was assigned to Belleville to start the 2024–25 season. He was recalled in October and made his NHL season debut on October 29, and recorded his first NHL point assisting on Noah Gregor's goal in an 8–1 win over the St. Louis Blues. He appeared in six games before being sent back to Belleville on November 12. He was recalled a second time on November 24. He appeared in 39 more games with Ottawa, finishing with one goal and four points and two goals and 11 points in 15 games with Belleville.

On March 7, 2025, he was traded to the San Jose Sharks alongside Gregor and a 2025 second-round pick in exchange for forwards Fabian Zetterlund, Tristen Robins, and a fourth-round pick in 2025. He was immediately assigned to San Jose's AHL affiliate, the San Jose Barracuda. He was recalled on March 14 and made his Sharks debut against the Washington Capitals the following day, centreing the fourth line between Barclay Goodrow and Carl Grundström. In 13 games with the Sharks, he went scoreless. The Sharks failed to qualify for the playoffs, and Ostapchuk was assigned to the AHL on April 23, along with teammate Jack Thompson to help the Barracuda in their playoff push.

To start the 2025–26 season, Ostapchuk was assigned to the Barracuda. He was recalled by the Sharks after an injury to Michael Misa on November 6 and was with the team for three games. However, he did not appear in any of them and was returned to the AHL on November 9. He was called up again on November 15 after Jeff Skinner was injured.In 11 games with the Barracuda, he scored three goals and four points. He tallied his first point with the Sharks on December 16, assisting on Goodrow's first period goal in a 6–3 victory over the Calgary Flames. He recorded his first goal with the team on December 29 in a 5–4 win over the Anaheim Ducks. As the season wore on, Ostapchuk established himself as the team's fourth line centre and on the team's penalty kill. In 59 games, he marked four goals and seven points. In June 2026, he signed a four-year contract with the Sharks.

== International play ==
Medal record

Representing Canada

Ice hockey

World Junior Championships
Gold medal – first place	2022 Canada	
Gold medal – first place	2023 Canada	

Ostapchuk was a member of two gold medal-winning Canadian junior hockey teams at the IIHF World Junior Championships in 2022 and 2023.

== Career statistics ==
=== Regular season and playoffs ===
			Regular season					Playoffs
Season	Team	League	GP	G	A	Pts	PIM	GP	G	A	Pts	PIM
2018–19	Vancouver Giants	WHL	6	0	0	0	0	2	0	0	0	0
2019–20	Vancouver Giants	WHL	44	5	3	8	14	—	—	—	—	—
2020–21	Vancouver Giants	WHL	22	7	9	16	26	—	—	—	—	—
2021–22	Vancouver Giants	WHL	60	26	17	43	58	12	7	16	23	4
2022–23	Vancouver Giants	WHL	21	10	19	29	20	—	—	—	—	—
2022–23	Winnipeg Ice	WHL	34	21	17	38	26	18	9	6	15	11
2023–24	Belleville Senators	AHL	69	17	11	28	47	6	1	1	2	0
2023–24	Ottawa Senators	NHL	7	0	0	0	0	—	—	—	—	—
2024–25	Belleville Senators	AHL	15	2	9	11	10	—	—	—	—	—
2024–25	Ottawa Senators	NHL	43	1	3	4	26	—	—	—	—	—
2024–25	San Jose Sharks	NHL	13	0	0	0	19	—	—	—	—	—
2024–25	San Jose Barracuda	AHL	—	—	—	—	—	6	0	0	0	6
2025–26	San Jose Barracuda	AHL	11	3	1	4	10	—	—	—	—	—
2025–26	San Jose Sharks	NHL	59	4	3	7	45	—	—	—	—	—
NHL totals			122	5	6	11	90	—	—	—	—	—

=== International ===
Year	Team	Event	Result	GP	G	A	Pts	PIM
2022	Canada	WJC	1st place, gold medalist(s)	7	1	2	3	0
2023	Canada	WJC	1st place, gold medalist(s)	7	2	1	3	25
Junior totals				14	3	3	6	25
