= Jared Davidson =

Canadian ice hockey player (born 2002)

- Born: July 7, 2002 (age 24) Edmonton, Alberta, Canada
- Height: 5 ft 11 in (180 cm)
- Weight: 183 lb (83 kg; 13 st 1 lb)
- Position: Centre
- Shoots: Left
- NHL team (P) Cur. team: Montreal Canadiens; Laval Rocket (AHL)
- NHL draft: 130th overall, 2022; Montreal Canadiens
- Playing career: 2023–present

Jared Davidson (born July 7, 2002) is a Canadian professional ice hockey centre for the Laval Rocket of the American Hockey League (AHL) while under contract to the Montreal Canadiens of the National Hockey League (NHL). He was selected in the fifth round, 130th overall, by the Canadiens in the 2022 NHL entry draft.

== Playing career ==
=== Junior ===
Initially being passed over in the annual Western Hockey League (WHL) bantam draft, Davidson began his minor hockey career in his hometown of Edmonton with the SSAC Bulldogs of the Alberta Minor Midget Hockey League (AMMHL) after being cut from Alberta Midget Hockey League (AMHL) ranks at age 15. Despite this, he attended training camp with the Seattle Thunderbirds as a free agent and ultimately signed with the team in August 2018. Over the course of his rookie WHL campaign, Davidson appeared in 48 games with the Thunderbirds, registering two goals and two assists including his first career WHL goal on November 17 against the Portland Winterhawks.

Although eligible for NHL entry draft consideration beginning in 2020, Davidson would go overlooked twice until prior to his overage season in 2022, where he was selected in the fifth round (130th overall) by the Montreal Canadiens. Thereafter, he was named as an alternate captain for the Thunderbirds en route to his team winning the Ed Chynoweth Cup as 2022–23 WHL champions. He then recorded six points in five games at the ensuing Memorial Cup tournament, where his team was downed by the Quebec Remparts in the championship final.

=== Professional ===
Remaining unsigned by the Canadiens following completion of major junior, Davidson instead signed a standard player contract to join the team's American Hockey League (AHL) affiliate the Laval Rocket for the 2023–24 season. Despite earning limited playing time during his inaugural professional season, he nonetheless ranked third among Rocket rookies in goals, trailing only teammates Logan Mailloux and Joshua Roy. For his efforts, he agreed to a two-year, entry-level contract with Montreal on May 31, 2024. In 2024–25, Davidson amassed 45 points in 69 games played along with a plus–minus differential of +25.

With the Canadiens experiencing multiple personnel injuries in the early stages of the 2025–26 season, Davidson was recalled by Montreal on November 14, 2025. The following day, he made his NHL debut in a matchup against the Boston Bruins.

As a restricted free agent in the 2026 offseason, Davidson signed a one-year, two-way extension with the Canadiens on July 20, 2026.

== Personal life ==
Davidson plays both the electric and acoustic guitar and is an amateur juggler.

== Career statistics ==
			Regular season					Playoffs
Season	Team	League	GP	G	A	Pts	PIM	GP	G	A	Pts	PIM
2017–18	SSAC Bulldogs	AMMHL	36	18	25	43	30	4	1	2	3	18
2017–18	SSAC Athletics	AMHL	3	0	1	1	0	1	0	0	0	0
2018–19	Seattle Thunderbirds	WHL	48	2	2	4	22	3	0	0	0	2
2019–20	Seattle Thunderbirds	WHL	59	8	8	16	46	—	—	—	—	—
2020–21	Seattle Thunderbirds	WHL	23	9	10	19	13	—	—	—	—	—
2021–22	Seattle Thunderbirds	WHL	64	42	47	89	68	25	13	16	29	10
2022–23	Seattle Thunderbirds	WHL	60	38	44	82	46	19	11	12	23	17
2023–24	Laval Rocket	AHL	38	11	5	16	31	—	—	—	—	—
2024–25	Laval Rocket	AHL	69	24	21	45	48	13	3	1	4	22
2025–26	Laval Rocket	AHL	53	16	9	25	59	3	0	0	0	2
2025–26	Montreal Canadiens	NHL	10	0	1	1	10	—	—	—	—	—
NHL totals			10	0	1	1	10	—	—	—	—	—

== Awards and honours ==
Award	Year	Ref
WHL
U.S. Division First All-Star Team	2022, 2023	
Ed Chynoweth Cup champion	2023	
