= Nolan Allan =

Canadian ice hockey player (born 2003)

- Born: April 28, 2003 (age 23) Davidson, Saskatchewan, Canada
- Height: 6 ft 2 in (188 cm)
- Weight: 195 lb (88 kg; 13 st 13 lb)
- Position: Defence
- Shoots: Left
- NHL team Former teams: San Jose Sharks; Chicago Blackhawks
- NHL draft: 32nd overall, 2021; Chicago Blackhawks
- Playing career: 2023–present

Nolan Allan (born April 28, 2003) is a Canadian professional ice hockey player who is a defenceman for the San Jose Sharks of the National Hockey League (NHL). Allan was drafted in the first round, 32nd overall, by the Chicago Blackhawks in the 2021 NHL entry draft, for whom he made his debut in 2024.

== Playing career ==
=== Junior ===
In the 2018 WHL Bantam Draft, the Prince Albert Raiders selected Allan in the first round, third overall. In the 2021 NHL Entry Draft, he was selected in first round, 32nd overall by the Chicago Blackhawks. He was later signed by the Blackhawks to a three-year, entry-level contract on September 17, 2021.

Prior to the 2022–23 season, on October 4, 2022, he was named captain of the Raiders. However, his tenure did not last long. On November 16, 2022, Allan and teammate Reese Shaw were traded to the Seattle Thunderbirds for Easton Kovacs, Braydon Dube, Gabe Ludwidg, and six draft selections, including two first rounds selections in 2023 and 2024. With the Thunderbirds, Allan won the Ed Chynoweth Cup as 2023 WHL playoff champions. This victory qualified the team for the 2023 Memorial Cup, where they reached the final, before being defeated by the Quebec Remparts. Allan was named to the Memorial Cup All-Star Team at the end of the tournament.

=== Professional ===
On October 8, 2024, Allan made his NHL debut with the Chicago Blackhawks in a 5–2 defeat to the Utah Hockey Club. He scored his first NHL goal on December 19, 2024, in a Blackhawks 3-1 victory at home against the Seattle Kraken.

On January 8, 2026, Allan was traded to the San Jose Sharks, alongside Laurent Brossoit and a seventh-round pick in 2028, in exchange for Ryan Ellis, Jake Furlong, and a fourth-round pick in 2028. He signed a two-year deal with the Sharks in June 2026.

== International play ==
Medal record

Representing Canada

Ice hockey

World Junior Championships
| Gold medal – first place | 2023 Canada | |

On December 12, 2022, Allan was named to Team Canada to compete at the 2023 World Junior Ice Hockey Championships. During the tournament he recorded one goal and one assist in seven games and won a gold medal.

== Career statistics ==
=== Regular season and playoffs ===
| | | | Regular season | | | | | Playoffs |
| Season | Team | League | GP | G | A | Pts | PIM | GP | G | A | Pts | PIM |
|---|---|---|---|---|---|---|---|---|---|---|---|---|
| 2018–19 | Saskatoon Blazers | SMAAAHL | 39 | 12 | 23 | 35 | 32 | 13 | 6 | 15 | 21 | 26 |
| 2018–19 | Prince Albert Raiders | WHL | 7 | 0 | 1 | 1 | 2 | — | — | — | — | — |
| 2019–20 | Prince Albert Raiders | WHL | 58 | 2 | 6 | 8 | 25 | — | — | — | — | — |
| 2020–21 | La Ronge Ice Wolves | SJHL | 5 | 2 | 3 | 5 | 10 | — | — | — | — | — |
| 2020–21 | Prince Albert Raiders | WHL | 16 | 1 | 1 | 2 | 21 | — | — | — | — | — |
| 2021–22 | Prince Albert Raiders | WHL | 65 | 7 | 34 | 41 | 69 | 5 | 0 | 1 | 1 | 2 |
| 2022–23 | Prince Albert Raiders | WHL | 16 | 4 | 7 | 11 | 10 | — | — | — | — | — |
| 2022–23 | Seattle Thunderbirds | WHL | 41 | 7 | 9 | 16 | 40 | 19 | 2 | 8 | 10 | 19 |
| 2023–24 | Rockford IceHogs | AHL | 60 | 5 | 12 | 17 | 47 | — | — | — | — | — |
| 2024–25 | Chicago Blackhawks | NHL | 43 | 1 | 7 | 8 | 16 | ― | ― | ― | ― | ― |
| 2024–25 | Rockford IceHogs | AHL | 20 | 2 | 4 | 6 | 43 | 7 | 0 | 4 | 4 | 17 |
| 2025–26 | Rockford IceHogs | AHL | 29 | 2 | 4 | 6 | 39 | ― | ― | ― | ― | ― |
| 2025–26 | San Jose Barracuda | AHL | 35 | 2 | 12 | 14 | 28 | 2 | 0 | 0 | 0 | 0 |
| NHL totals | | | 43 | 1 | 7 | 8 | 16 | — | — | — | — | — |

=== International ===
| Year | Team | Event | Result | GP | G | A | Pts | PIM |
|---|---|---|---|---|---|---|---|---|
| 2019 | Canada Red | U17 | 5th | 5 | 0 | 1 | 1 | 2 |
| 2021 | Canada | U18 | 1st place, gold medalist(s) | 7 | 1 | 1 | 2 | 2 |
| 2023 | Canada | WJC | 1st place, gold medalist(s) | 7 | 1 | 1 | 2 | 4 |
| Junior totals | | | | 19 | 2 | 3 | 5 | 8 |

== Awards and achievements ==
| Award | Year | Ref |
CHL
| Memorial Cup All-Star Team | 2023 | |
WHL
| Ed Chynoweth Cup | 2023 | |

Awards and achievements
| Preceded by Lukas Reichel | Chicago Blackhawks first-round draft pick 2021 | Succeeded by Kevin Korchinski |
