= Reid Schaefer =

Canadian Ice hockey player (born 2003)

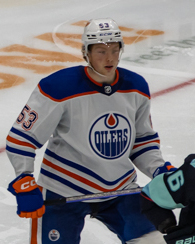
- Schaefer during a 2022 preseason game with the Edmonton Oilers
- Born: September 21, 2003 (age 22) Spruce Grove, Alberta, Canada
- Height: 6 ft 5 in (196 cm)
- Weight: 226 lb (103 kg; 16 st 2 lb)
- Position: Winger
- Shoots: Left
- NHL team: Nashville Predators
- NHL draft: 32nd overall, 2022; Edmonton Oilers
- Playing career: 2023–present

Reid Schaefer (born September 21, 2003) is a Canadian professional ice hockey player who is a winger for the Nashville Predators of the National Hockey League (NHL). Schaefer was drafted 32nd overall by the Edmonton Oilers in the 2022 NHL entry draft, but he was traded to Nashville the following season.

== Early life ==
Schaefer was born on September 21, 2003, in Spruce Grove, Alberta, Canada to father Jeremy. He was born into an athletic family as his father and cousin both played ice hockey. His father was drafted by the National Hockey League's (NHL) Boston Bruins after playing five years in the Western Hockey League. As well, his cousin Colin Fraser was a third-round draft pick by the Philadelphia Flyers.

== Playing career ==
Growing up in Alberta, Schaefer played with the Edmonton Okanagan Hockey Academy (OHA) Bantam Prep Team in the Canadian Sports School Hockey League. During the 2017–18 season, he tallied 11 goals and 12 assists for 23 points through 27 games. After being drafted in the eighth round by the Seattle Thunderbirds of the Western Hockey League (WHL), Schaefer returned to the OHA Edmonton Elite where he accumulated 24 points through 34 games. Following his second season with the OHA prep team, Schaefer signed a WHL Standard Player Agreement with the Thunderbirds on September 2, 2018. Schaefer played seven games with the Thunderbirds before the COVID-19 pandemic caused the WHL to pause play for the season. Due to the pause, Schaefer played with the Spruce Grove Saints in the Alberta Junior Hockey League (AJHL) during the 2019–20 season, where tallied 6 goals and 16 points while accumulating 32 penalty minutes.

Schaefer played his first full season with the Thunderbirds during the 2021–22 season where he scored 32 goals and 58 points in 66 regular season games. He began the season with low expectations as a 'C' ranked prospect on NHL Central Scouting Bureau's (CSS) preliminary ‘Players to Watch’ list for the 2022 NHL entry draft. His ranking climbed as the season progressed, which Schaefer credited to his work during the offseason. After tallying 32 goals in 66 games, Schaefer jumped to 31st amongst North American skaters by the CSS. As the Thunderbirds qualified for the WHL playoffs, Oilers scouts encouraged General Manager Ken Holland to attend the WHL final games in Edmonton and observe Schaefer play. Leading up to the draft, Schaefer drew comparisons to Zack Kassian and was described as having "a legit skill, scoring touch and tenacity" who is destined to be a middle-six winger. As a result of his play and jump in rankings, Schaefer was selected 32nd overall in the first round of the entry draft by the Edmonton Oilers. Following the draft, GM Holland praised Schaefer for being a strong competitive big player who could play at the NHL level within two to three years.

Following the draft, Schaefer signed a three-year entry-level contract with the Oilers and took part in their Development Camp. He also participated in the Oilers' rookie camp where he worked on his strength and explosiveness when skating. He completed training camp with the Oilers before being returned to the Thunderbirds for the 2022–23 season. He never played for the Oilers, as on February 28, 2023, Schaefer was traded to the Nashville Predators, along with Tyson Barrie, a 2023 first round pick and a 2024 fourth round pick, in exchange for Mattias Ekholm and a 2023 sixth round pick. The Thunderbirds won the WHL championship Ed Chynoweth Cup and reached the final of the 2023 Memorial Cup, but were defeated there by the Quebec Remparts.

== International play ==
Medal record

Representing Canada

Ice hockey

World Junior Championships
Gold medal – first place	2023 Canada	

On December 12, 2022, Schaefer was named to the Team Canada roster for the 2023 World Junior Ice Hockey Championships. During the tournament, he recorded one assist in seven games and won a gold medal with Canada in the final against Czechia.

== Career statistics ==
=== Regular season and playoffs ===
			Regular season					Playoffs
Season	Team	League	GP	G	A	Pts	PIM	GP	G	A	Pts	PIM
2019–20	Spruce Grove Saints	AJHL	33	6	10	16	32	2	0	0	0	2
2019–20	Seattle Thunderbirds	WHL	7	0	1	1	9	—	—	—	—	—
2020–21	Spruce Grove Saints	AJHL	3	0	0	0	2	—	—	—	—	—
2020–21	Seattle Thunderbirds	WHL	18	0	2	2	14	—	—	—	—	—
2021–22	Seattle Thunderbirds	WHL	66	32	26	58	88	25	6	15	21	32
2022–23	Seattle Thunderbirds	WHL	55	28	33	61	92	19	8	11	19	24
2023–24	Milwaukee Admirals	AHL	63	7	14	21	39	14	1	2	3	35
2024–25	Milwaukee Admirals	AHL	19	8	6	14	27	—	—	—	—	—
2025–26	Milwaukee Admirals	AHL	33	15	13	28	55	3	1	1	2	6
2025–26	Nashville Predators	NHL	47	6	2	8	17	—	—	—	—	—
NHL totals			47	6	2	8	17	—	—	—	—	—

=== International ===
Year	Team	Event	Result	GP	G	A	Pts	PIM
2023	Canada	WJC	1st place, gold medalist(s)	7	0	1	1	2
Junior totals				7	0	1	1	2

Awards and achievements
Preceded by Xavier Bourgault	Edmonton Oilers' first-round draft pick 2022	Succeeded by Sam O'Reilly
