= Brad Lambert (ice hockey) =

Finnish ice hockey player (born 2003)

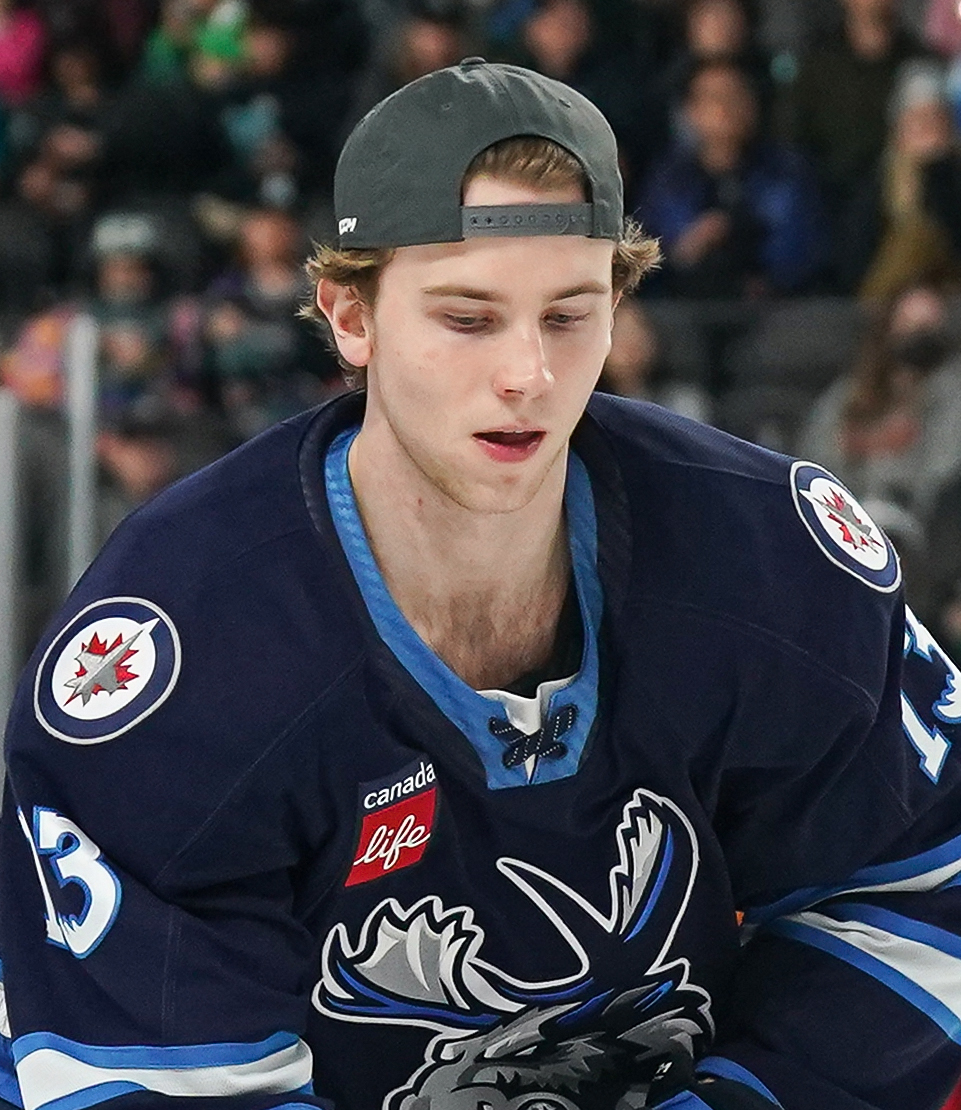
- Lambert with the Manitoba Moose in 2024
- Born: 19 December 2003 (age 22) Lahti, Finland
- Height: 6 ft 0 in (183 cm)
- Weight: 173 lb (78 kg; 12 st 5 lb)
- Position: Forward
- Shoots: Right
- NHL team (P) Cur. team Former teams: Winnipeg Jets; Manitoba Moose (AHL); HIFK; JYP; Lahti Pelicans
- NHL draft: 30th overall, 2022; Winnipeg Jets
- Playing career: 2019–present

Brad Lambert (born 19 December 2003) is a Finnish-Canadian professional ice hockey player who is a forward for the Manitoba Moose of the American Hockey League (AHL) while under contract to the Winnipeg Jets of the National Hockey League. He was drafted 30th overall by the Jets in the 2022 NHL entry draft.

== Playing career ==
On 13 December 2019, 15-year-old Lambert made his professional debut for HIFK of the SM-liiga, the top league in Finland. Following the season, in which he scored 38 points in 42 games with HIFK's U20 club and two points in four games with their senior club, Lambert exercised a contractual option to leave the organization.

On 8 May 2020, Lambert signed a two-year contract with Finnish club JYP Jyväskylä. He would score 15 points in 46 games in the 2020–21 season, leading all under-18 players.

Entering the 2021–22 season, Lambert was considered one of the top prospects for the upcoming 2022 NHL entry draft, ranked as high as second overall by some scouts. After a disastrous start to the season that saw him score only six points in 24 games, Lambert's contract was terminated by mutual agreement and he signed with his hometown club, the Lahti Pelicans. In Lahti, his production stalled even further, to just four points in 25 games. Following this tumultuous and disappointing season, he fell in the draft until he was selected by the Winnipeg Jets in the first round, 30th overall.

In June 2022, despite never playing a game in the league and all signs pointing to him playing at the professional level upon arriving in North America, the Seattle Thunderbirds acquired Lambert's Western Hockey League (WHL) rights from the Saskatoon Blades in exchange for draft picks.

Lambert attended Jets training camp prior to the 2022–23 season. On 12 October 2022, he was signed to a three-year entry-level contract and assigned to the Jets' American Hockey League (AHL) affiliate, the Manitoba Moose. After 14 games with the Moose in which he scored only three points, the Jets assigned Lambert to the Thunderbirds. With the Thunderbirds, Lambert scored 48 points in 26 games, as well as 26 points in 17 playoff games en route to winning the 2023 Ed Chynoweth Cup as WHL champions. The Thunderbirds then reached the final of the 2023 Memorial Cup, where they were defeated by the Quebec Remparts.

Returning to the Moose for the 2023–24 season, Lambert was named to the 2024 AHL All-Star Game. With multiple Jets regulars not playing the final game of the season to rest ahead of the playoffs, Lambert was recalled to the NHL. He finished the AHL season with 20 goals and 52 points, good for second in rookie point scoring and earning a spot on the AHL All-Rookie Team. In his NHL debut on 18 April 2024, Lambert recorded an assist in a 4–2 victory over the Vancouver Canucks.

== International play ==
Medal record

Men's ice hockey

Representing Finland

World Junior Championships
Silver medal – second place	2022 Canada	
Bronze medal – third place	2021 Canada	

Lambert represented Finland at the 2019 Hlinka Gretzky Cup, as a 15-year-old at the under-18 tournament, where he scored a hat-trick in a 6–0 victory against Switzerland.

Lambert has attended three IIHF World Junior Championships, winning bronze in 2021 and silver in 2022, and finishing fifth in 2023.

== Personal life ==
Lambert was born in Lahti, Finland to a Canadian father and a Finnish mother, and he is a citizen of both countries. His uncle Lane Lambert is a former NHL player and current coach. His father Ross played for the Saskatoon Blades and professionally in the American Hockey League (AHL) and in the United Kingdom's Elite Ice Hockey League (EIHL), where his uncle Dale also played. His cousin Jimmy played for the University of Michigan.

== Career statistics ==
=== Regular season and playoffs ===
			Regular season					Playoffs
Season	Team	League	GP	G	A	Pts	PIM	GP	G	A	Pts	PIM
2018–19	Lahti Pelicans	U20	17	2	9	11	18	10	1	1	2	6
2019–20	HIFK	U20	42	18	20	38	28	—	—	—	—	—
2019–20	HIFK	Liiga	4	0	2	2	0	—	—	—	—	—
2020–21	JYP Jyväskylä	Liiga	46	7	8	15	18	—	—	—	—	—
2021–22	JYP Jyväskylä	U20	1	0	1	1	0	—	—	—	—	—
2021–22	JYP Jyväskylä	Liiga	24	2	4	6	31	—	—	—	—	—
2021–22	Lahti Pelicans	Liiga	25	2	2	4	12	3	0	0	0	0
2022–23	Manitoba Moose	AHL	14	2	1	3	8	—	—	—	—	—
2022–23	Seattle Thunderbirds	WHL	26	17	21	38	12	17	6	20	26	8
2023–24	Manitoba Moose	AHL	64	21	34	55	38	2	0	1	1	0
2023–24	Winnipeg Jets	NHL	1	0	1	1	0	—	—	—	—	—
2024–25	Manitoba Moose	AHL	61	7	28	35	28	—	—	—	—	—
2024–25	Winnipeg Jets	NHL	5	0	1	1	2	—	—	—	—	—
2025–26	Manitoba Moose	AHL	34	6	7	13	18	—	—	—	—	—
2025–26	Winnipeg Jets	NHL	25	3	3	6	6	—	—	—	—	—
Liiga totals			99	11	16	27	61	3	0	0	0	0
NHL totals			31	3	5	8	8	—	—	—	—	—

=== International ===
Year	Team	Event	Result	GP	G	A	Pts	PIM
2019	Finland	U17	7th	5	1	5	6	2
2019	Finland	HG18	4th	3	3	0	3	0
2021	Finland	WJC	3rd place, bronze medalist(s)	7	1	3	4	0
2021	Finland	U18	4th	5	0	5	5	2
2022	Finland	WJC	2nd place, silver medalist(s)	5	1	0	1	4
2023	Finland	WJC	5th	5	1	0	1	4
Junior totals				30	7	13	20	12

== Awards and honours ==
Award	Year	Ref
AHL
All-Star Game	2024	
All-Rookie Team	2024	

Awards and achievements
Preceded by Rutger McGroarty	Winnipeg Jets first-round draft pick 2022	Succeeded by Colby Barlow
