= Christoffer Sedoff =

Finnish ice hockey player

- Born: 20 February 2002 (age 24) Helsinki, Finland
- Height: 6 ft 2 in (188 cm)
- Weight: 209 lb (95 kg; 14 st 13 lb)
- Position: Defenseman
- Shoots: Left
- NHL team (P) Cur. team Former teams: Nashville Predators; Milwaukee Admirals (AHL); SaiPa
- NHL draft: Undrafted
- Playing career: 2023–present

Christoffer Wilhelm Sedoff (born 20 February 2002) is a Finnish professional ice hockey defenseman currently playing for the Milwaukee Admirals of the American Hockey League (AHL) as a prospect for the Nashville Predators of the National Hockey League (NHL).

== Playing career ==
=== Junior ===
Sedoff developed within the youth system of HIFK in his hometown of Helsinki, Finland. Seeking a path to the North American professional leagues, he entered the 2019 CHL Import Draft, where he was selected 25th overall by the Red Deer Rebels. He subsequently moved to Canada to join the Rebels in the Western Hockey League (WHL) for the 2019–20 season.

After a temporary return to Finland due to the league disruptions caused by the COVID-19 pandemic— which included brief stints with FPS in Mestis and 26 matches for SaiPa in Liiga — Sedoff rejoined Red Deer and established himself as one of the WHL's premier puck-moving defensemen. During the 2021–22 campaign, he recorded a breakout performance with 61 points in 65 games. He followed this with a 51-point showing in 59 games during the 2022–23 season, earning consecutive selections to the WHL Central First All-Star Team.

=== Professional ===
Despite his high-scoring junior career, Sedoff went undrafted in the NHL Entry Draft. On 2 March 2023, he signed a three-year, entry-level contract as a free agent with the Vegas Golden Knights.

He transitioned to the professional ranks in the 2023–24 season, assigned to the Golden Knights' AHL affiliate, the Henderson Silver Knights. Serving primarily as a defensive defenseman in his rookie year, he registered 10 assists in 46 games. The following season, he scored his first professional goal, concluding the 2024–25 year with 14 points over 61 games.

During his third season with Henderson, Sedoff was traded near the NHL trade deadline on 3 March 2026. The Golden Knights sent Sedoff and a 2028 third-round draft selection to the Nashville Predators in exchange for veteran forward Cole Smith. Following the trade, the Predators reassigned Sedoff to their AHL affiliate, the Milwaukee Admirals, where he played out the remainder of the 2025–26 regular season.

== Personal ==
Sedoff was scheduled to start his military service for the Finnish army starting 14 April 2025. He was assigned to the sports school within the Guard Jaeger Regiment in Santahamina, Helsinki.

== Career statistics ==
=== Regular season and playoffs ===
			Regular season					Playoffs
Season	Team	League	GP	G	A	Pts	PIM	GP	G	A	Pts	PIM
2018–19	Red Deer Rebels	WHL	61	5	14	19	40	—	—	—	—	—
2019–20	HIFK U20	U20 SM-liiga	32	0	3	3	18	4	0	0	0	2
2020–21	FPS	Mestis	7	0	1	1	6	—	—	—	—	—
2020–21	SaiPa	Liiga	26	0	2	2	8	—	—	—	—	—
2021–22	Red Deer Rebels	WHL	65	7	54	61	52	8	0	2	2	6
2022–23	Red Deer Rebels	WHL	59	5	46	51	24	12	4	3	7	4
2023–24	Henderson Silver Knights	AHL	46	0	10	10	19	—	—	—	—	—
2024–25	Henderson Silver Knights	AHL	61	4	10	14	31	—	—	—	—	—
2025–26	Henderson Silver Knights	AHL	38	0	4	4	15	—	—	—	—	—
2025–26	Milwaukee Admirals	AHL	12	0	0	0	0	1	0	0	0	0
AHL totals			157	4	24	28	65	1	0	0	0	0

=== International ===
Year	Team	Event	GP	G	A	Pts	PIM
2018	Finland	HG18	4	0	0	0	0
2018	Finland	WHC-17	6	0	0	0	2
Junior totals			10	0	0	0	2

== Awards and honors ==
Award	Year	Ref
WHL Central First All-Star Team	2022, 2023	
