= Ludvig Jansson =

Swedish ice hockey player (born 2003)

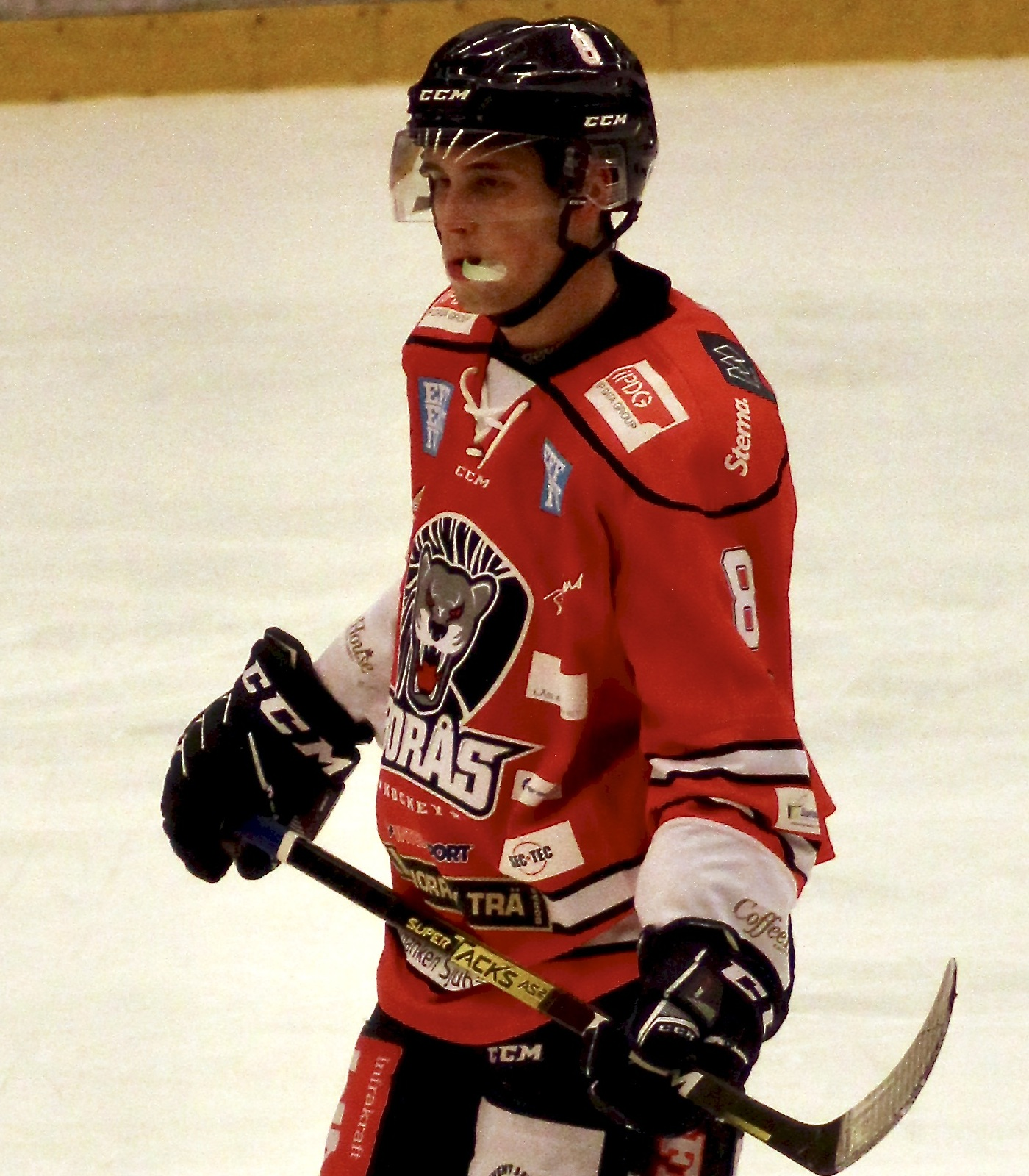
- Jansson in 2019
- Born: 27 December 2003 (age 22) Stockholm, Sweden
- Height: 183 cm (6 ft 0 in)
- Weight: 82 kg (181 lb; 12 st 13 lb)
- Position: Defence
- Shoots: Right
- NHL team (P) Cur. team Former teams: Florida Panthers; Charlotte Checkers (AHL); Lulea HF
- NHL draft: 125th overall, 2022; Florida Panthers
- Playing career: 2023–present

Ludvig Jansson (born 27 December 2003) is a Swedish professional ice hockey defenceman for the Charlotte Checkers of the American Hockey League (AHL), while under contract to the Florida Panthers of the National Hockey League (NHL). He previously played for Lulea HF of the Swedish Hockey League (SHL).

== Playing career ==
Jansson was drafted in the fourth round, 125th overall, by the Florida Panthers in the 2022 NHL entry draft. He began his career with Södertälje SK of the HockeyAllsvenskan. He made his SHL debut for Luleå HF during the 2023–24 season, and recorded three assists in 50 regular season games. During the 2024–25 season, he recorded one goal and three assists in 50 regular season games. During the playoffs he recorded two assists in 17 games to help Luleå win their first Le Mat Trophy since 1996.

On 6 May 2025, he signed a three-year, entry-level contract with the Panthers. On 29 September 2025, he was assigned to the Charlotte Checkers of the AHL. With five of their regular defensemen sidelined by injuries, the Florida Panthers recalled Jansson on 9 April 2026. Prior to being recalled he recorded three goals and seven assists in 29 games with the Checkers during the 2025–26 season, in his rookie year. He made his NHL debut for the Panthers later that day against the Ottawa Senators and had 13:37 of ice time. On 17 April 2026, he was returned to the Checkers following the conclusion of the NHL regular season. He recorded one assist in four NHL games.

== International play ==
Medal record

Ice hockey

Representing Sweden

World Junior Championships
| Bronze medal – third place | 2022 Canada | |

Jansson made his international debut for Sweden at the 2022 World Junior Ice Hockey Championships where he was scoreless in four games and won a bronze medal. He again represented Sweden at the 2023 World Junior Ice Hockey Championships where he tied Filip Bystedt for the team lead in scoring with four goals and six assists in seven games. He led all tournament defenceman in goals and points (10) and was subsequently named to the Media All-Star team.

== Career statistics ==
=== Regular season and playoffs ===
| | | | Regular season | | | | | Playoffs |
| Season | Team | League | GP | G | A | Pts | PIM | GP | G | A | Pts | PIM |
|---|---|---|---|---|---|---|---|---|---|---|---|---|
| 2019–20 | Södertälje SK | J18 | 17 | 3 | 6 | 9 | 10 | — | — | — | — | — |
| 2019–20 | Södertälje SK | J20 | 30 | 1 | 4 | 5 | 8 | — | — | — | — | — |
| 2020–21 | Södertälje SK | J20 | 18 | 1 | 11 | 12 | 12 | — | — | — | — | — |
| 2020–21 | Södertälje SK | Allsv | 20 | 1 | 1 | 2 | 0 | — | — | — | — | — |
| 2021–22 | Södertälje SK | J20 | 9 | 2 | 2 | 4 | 2 | — | — | — | — | — |
| 2021–22 | Södertälje SK | Allsv | 47 | 2 | 3 | 5 | 10 | — | — | — | — | — |
| 2022–23 | Södertälje SK | J20 | 7 | 2 | 3 | 5 | 6 | — | — | — | — | — |
| 2022–23 | Södertälje SK | Allsv | 44 | 1 | 9 | 10 | 10 | 6 | 0 | 0 | 0 | 0 |
| 2023–24 | Södertälje SK | J20 | 1 | 1 | 1 | 2 | 2 | — | — | — | — | — |
| 2023–24 | Luleå HF | SHL | 50 | 0 | 3 | 3 | 25 | 7 | 0 | 0 | 0 | 0 |
| 2024–25 | Luleå HF | SHL | 50 | 1 | 3 | 4 | 37 | 17 | 0 | 2 | 2 | 2 |
| 2025–26 | Charlotte Checkers | AHL | 31 | 3 | 8 | 11 | 12 | 2 | 1 | 0 | 1 | 2 |
| 2025–26 | Florida Panthers | NHL | 4 | 0 | 1 | 1 | 0 | — | — | — | — | — |
| NHL totals | | | 4 | 0 | 1 | 1 | 0 | — | — | — | — | — |
| SHL totals | | | 100 | 1 | 6 | 7 | 62 | 24 | 0 | 2 | 2 | 2 |

=== International ===
| Year | Team | Event | Result | GP | G | A | Pts | PIM |
|---|---|---|---|---|---|---|---|---|
| 2022 | Sweden | WJC | 3rd place, bronze medalist(s) | 4 | 0 | 0 | 0 | 0 |
| 2023 | Sweden | WJC | 4th | 7 | 4 | 6 | 10 | 4 |
| Junior totals | | | | 11 | 4 | 6 | 10 | 4 |
