= Kenny Connors =

- Born: March 10, 2003 (age 23) Glen Mills, Pennsylvania
- Height: 6 ft 2 in (188 cm)
- Weight: 207 lb (94 kg; 14 st 11 lb)
- Position: Centre
- Shoots: Left
- NHL team (P) Cur. team: Los Angeles Kings; Ontario Reign (AHL)
- NHL draft: 103rd overall, 2022; Los Angeles Kings
- Playing career: 2025–present

Kenny Connors (born March 10, 2003) is an American professional Ice Hockey forward who plays as a centre for the Ontario Reign in the American Hockey League (AHL) as a prospect to the Los Angeles Kings of the National Hockey League (NHL). He made his NHL debut in 2026.

== Playing career ==
Kenny Connors began his junior career with the Dubuque Fighting Saints of the USHL, playing from 2020 to 2022. He recorded 74 points before joining the University of Massachusetts Amherst. With UMass, Connors totaled 77 points over three seasons and was named to the Hockey East All-Rookie Team in 2022–23.

The Los Angeles Kings selected Connors 103rd overall in the fourth round of the 2022 NHL Entry Draft. He signed a two-year entry-level contract with the Kings in April 2025 and began his professional career with the Ontario Reign of the AHL during the 2025–26 season. He recorded 41 points in 65 games.

Connors made his NHL debut with the Kings on March 2, 2026, against the Colorado Avalanche. He appeared in two NHL games during the season. He primarily played Centre and was also used on both special teams units with Ontario.

== Career statistics ==
=== Regular season and playoffs ===
			Regular season					Playoffs
Season	Team	League	GP	G	A	Pts	PIM	GP	G	A	Pts	PIM
2017–18	Malvern Prep	USHS	7	7	4	11	12	—	—	—	—	—
2018–19	Malvern Prep	USHS	6	2	3	5	0	—	—	—	—	—
2019–20	U.S. National Development Team	USHL	2	0	0	0	0	—	—	—	—	—
2020–21	Dubuque Fighting Saints	USHL	50	3	15	18	16	2	1	0	1	0
2021–22	Dubuque Fighting Saints	USHL	61	25	31	56	45	2	1	1	2	0
2022–23	UMass-Amherst	HE	32	9	17	26	8	—	—	—	—	—
2023–24	UMass-Amherst	HE	37	7	15	22	14	—	—	—	—	—
2024–25	UMass-Amherst	HE	40	10	19	29	6	—	—	—	—	—
2025–26	Ontario Reign	AHL	65	15	26	41	30	5	0	2	2	0
2025–26	Los Angeles Kings	NHL	2	0	0	0	0	—	—	—	—	—
NHL totals			2	0	0	0	0	—	—	—	—	—

=== International ===
Year	Team	Event	Result	GP	G	A	Pts	PIM
2023	United States	WJC	3rd place, bronze medalist(s)	7	2	0	2	25
Junior totals				7	2	0	2	25
