= Isak Rosén =

Swedish ice hockey player (born 2003)

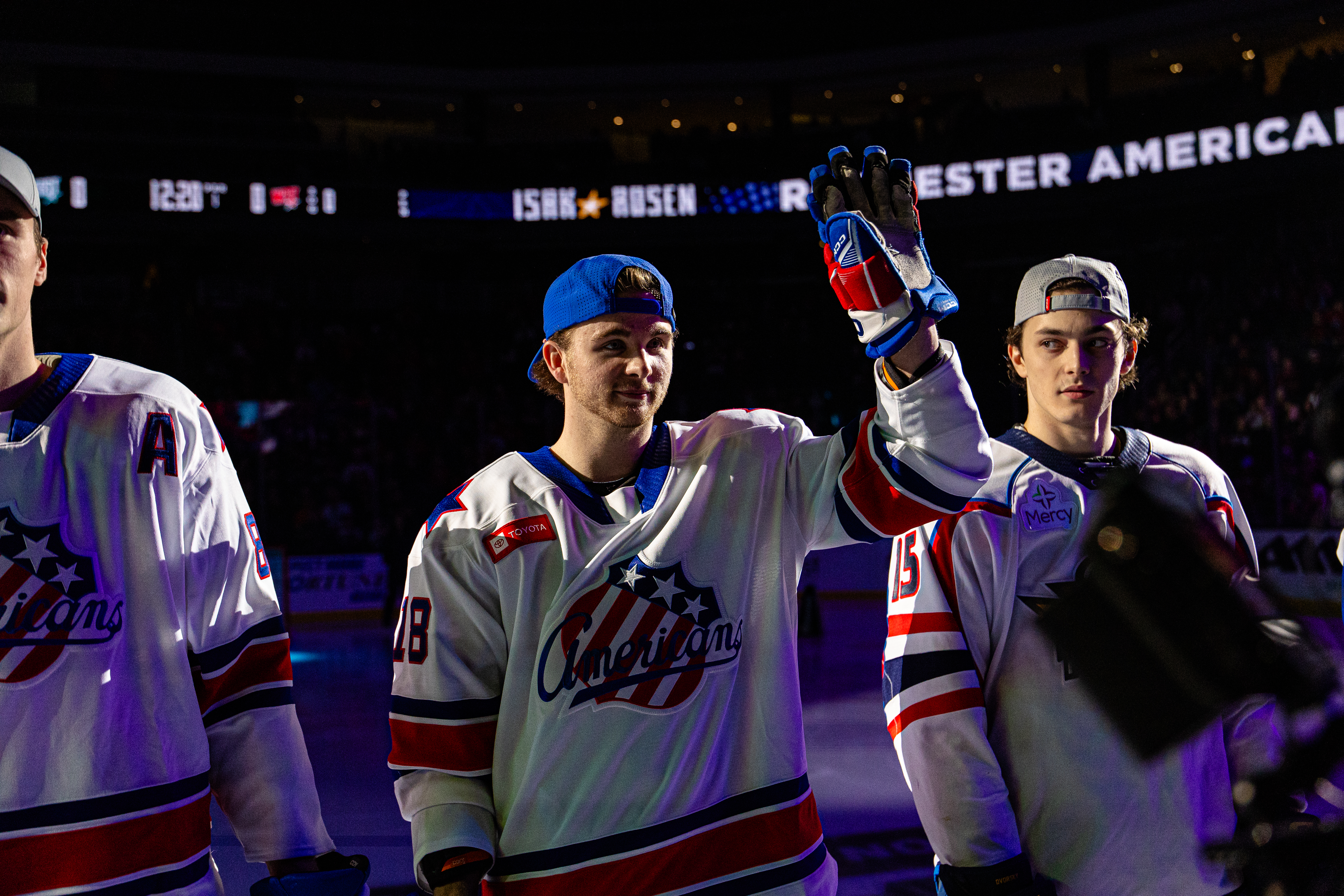
- Rosén with the Rochester Americans in 2025
- Born: 15 March 2003 (age 23) Stockholm, Sweden
- Height: 6 ft 0 in (183 cm)
- Weight: 185 lb (84 kg; 13 st 3 lb)
- Position: Right wing
- Shoots: Left
- NHL team Former teams: Winnipeg Jets; Leksands IF; Buffalo Sabres
- NHL draft: 14th overall, 2021; Buffalo Sabres
- Playing career: 2020–present

Isak Rosén (born 15 March 2003) is a Swedish professional ice hockey player who is a right winger for the Winnipeg Jets of the National Hockey League (NHL). Rosén was drafted in the first round, 14th overall, by the Buffalo Sabres in the 2021 NHL entry draft, with whom he debuted in 2023.

== Playing career ==
Rosén made his Swedish Hockey League (SHL) debut with Leksands IF during the 2019–20 season, playing a single game. Isak was drafted by the Buffalo Sabres in the first round of the 2021 NHL entry draft.

On 1 June 2022, Rosén was signed to a three-year, entry-level contract with the Buffalo Sabres.

On 25 November 2023, Rosén made his NHL debut with the Sabres against the New Jersey Devils.

On March 6, 2026, Rosen was traded to the Winnipeg Jets, alongside Jacob Bryson, a conditional 2026 4th-round pick, and a 2027 second-round pick, in exchange for Luke Schenn and Logan Stanley. Later, on March 12th, 2026 Rosen scored his first goal as a Winnipeg Jet.

Medal record

Representing Sweden

Ice hockey

World Junior Championships
Bronze medal – third place	2022 Canada	

World U18 Championships
Bronze medal – third place	2021 Canada	

== Career statistics ==
=== Regular season and playoffs ===
			Regular season					Playoffs
Season	Team	League	GP	G	A	Pts	PIM	GP	G	A	Pts	PIM
2019–20	Leksands IF	J20	38	21	14	35	8	—	—	—	—	—
2019–20	Leksands IF	SHL	1	0	0	0	0	—	—	—	—	—
2020–21	Leksands IF	J20	12	7	5	12	6	—	—	—	—	—
2020–21	Leksands IF	SHL	22	0	1	1	2	—	—	—	—	—
2021–22	Leksands IF	J20	8	4	5	9	0	—	—	—	—	—
2021–22	Leksands IF	SHL	28	2	2	4	0	—	—	—	—	—
2021–22	Mora IK	Allsv	3	1	1	2	0	—	—	—	—	—
2022–23	Rochester Americans	AHL	66	14	23	37	14	14	4	4	8	2
2023–24	Rochester Americans	AHL	67	20	30	50	12	5	2	0	2	0
2023–24	Buffalo Sabres	NHL	7	0	0	0	0	—	—	—	—	—
2024–25	Rochester Americans	AHL	61	28	27	55	10	8	5	1	6	2
2024–25	Buffalo Sabres	NHL	8	0	1	1	0	—	—	—	—	—
2025–26	Rochester Americans	AHL	37	25	18	43	6	—	—	—	—	—
2025–26	Buffalo Sabres	NHL	16	3	4	7	0	—	—	—	—	—
2025–26	Winnipeg Jets	NHL	21	3	0	3	0	—	—	—	—	—
SHL totals			51	2	3	5	2	—	—	—	—	—
NHL totals			52	6	5	11	0	—	—	—	—	—

=== International ===
Year	Team	Event	Result	GP	G	A	Pts	PIM
2019	Sweden	U17	6th	5	0	2	2	2
2021	Sweden	U18	3rd place, bronze medalist(s)	7	7	2	9	0
2022	Sweden	WJC	3rd place, bronze medalist(s)	7	4	1	5	0
2023	Sweden	WJC	4th	7	2	4	6	4
Junior totals				26	13	9	22	6

Awards and achievements
Preceded by Owen Power	Buffalo Sabres first-round draft pick 2021	Succeeded by Matthew Savoie
