= Lian Bichsel =

Swiss ice hockey player (born 2004)

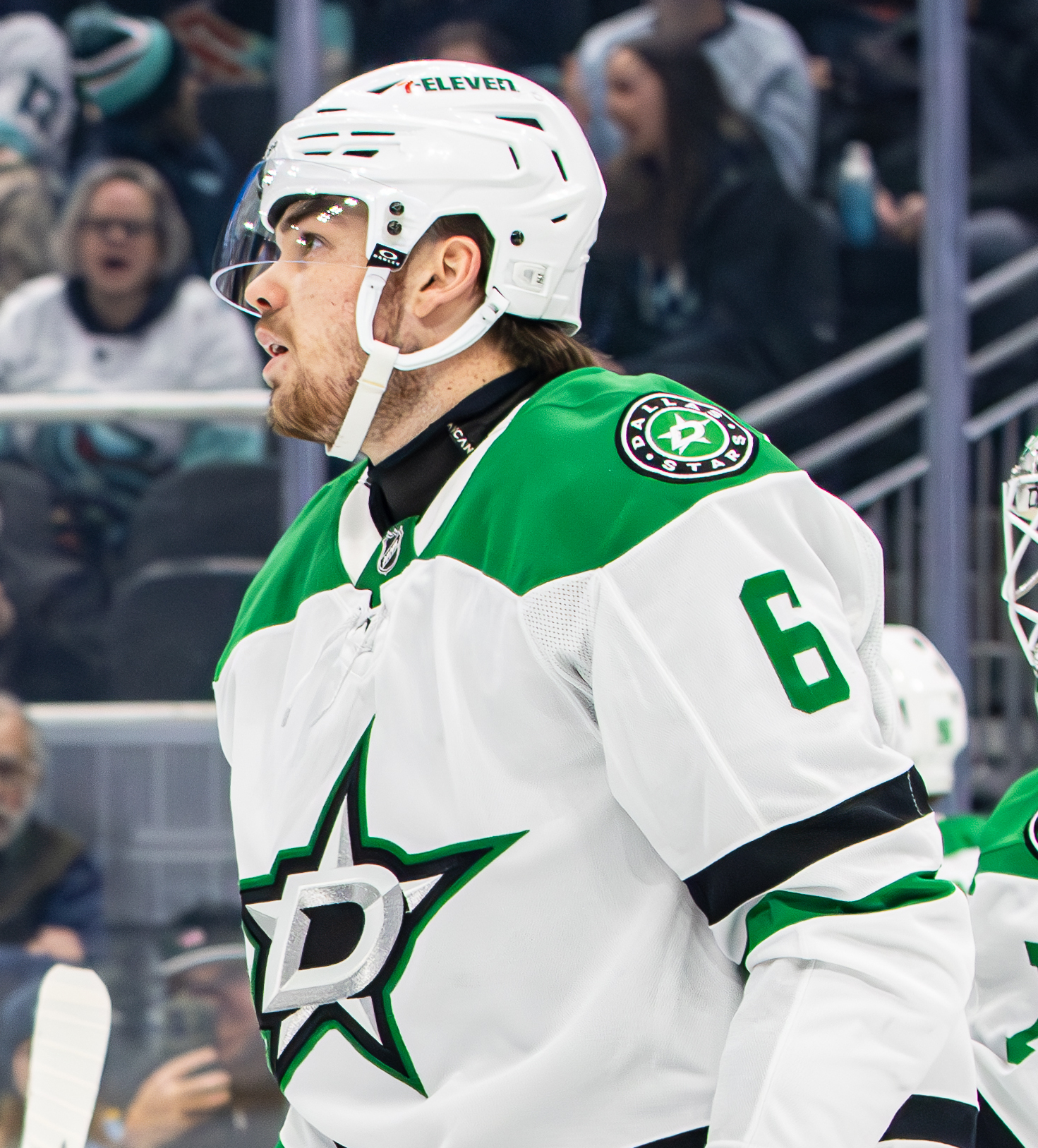
- Bichsel with the Dallas Stars in 2025
- Born: 18 May 2004 (age 22) Olten, Switzerland
- Height: 6 ft 7 in (201 cm)
- Weight: 237 lb (108 kg; 16 st 13 lb)
- Position: Defence
- Shoots: Left
- NHL team Former teams: Dallas Stars; EHC Biel; Leksands IF; Rögle BK
- NHL draft: 18th overall, 2022; Dallas Stars
- Playing career: 2021–present

Lian Bichsel (pronounced bih-SHEHL) (born 18 May 2004) is a Swiss professional ice hockey player who is a defenceman for the Dallas Stars of the National Hockey League (NHL). Bichsel was drafted in the first round, 18th overall, by the Stars in the 2022 NHL entry draft.

== Playing career ==
Bichsel originally played as a youth in his native Switzerland with hometown club EHC Olten's junior ranks. Moving to EHC Biel from the under-15 level, Bichsel showed promising development for his size within his three seasons with the club.

Bichsel made his professional senior debut in the Swiss National League with EHC Biel during the 2020–21 season, featuring in four games.

To continue his upward trajectory, Bichsel moved from Switzerland to the more competitive Swedish J20 Nationell, by agreeing to a contract with the junior club of Leksands IF on 24 May 2021. In the following 2021–22 season, Bichsel was soon elevated to make his Swedish Hockey League (SHL) debut and was later rewarded with a two-year rookie contract through 2023 with Leksands on 21 January 2022. He finished his first season in the league by posting one goal and three points through 29 games.

On 7 July 2022, Bichsel's impressive season was acknowledged by his selection by the Dallas Stars in the first round, 18th overall, of the 2022 NHL entry draft. Returning to Sweden for his final season under contract with Leksands in the 2022–23 season, Bichsel continued his development, featuring primarily in a third-pairing role on the blueline alongside veteran Jonas Ahnelöv.

On 6 May 2023, the Stars signed Bichsel to a three-year, entry-level contract. After attending the Stars 2023 training camp, Bichsel was assigned to begin the 2023–24 season in the AHL with affiliate, the Texas Stars. Bichsel contributed with 1 goal and 7 points from the blueline through 16 games before he left North America and returned to Sweden on loan by the Stars, joining Rögle BK of the SHL for the remainder of the season on 29 November 2023.

== Personal life ==
Bichsel’s brother Joel, plays professional football for the 1. FC Saarbrücken of the 3. Liga in Germany.

== Career statistics ==
=== Regular season and playoffs ===
			Regular season					Playoffs
Season	Team	League	GP	G	A	Pts	PIM	GP	G	A	Pts	PIM
2020–21	EHC Biel	U20-Elit	45	5	23	28	48	2	0	0	0	0
2020–21	EHC Biel	NL	4	0	0	0	0	—	—	—	—	—
2021–22	Leksands IF	J20	11	3	4	7	6	1	0	0	0	2
2021–22	Leksands IF	SHL	29	1	2	3	16	—	—	—	—	—
2022–23	Leksands IF	J20	8	1	2	3	4	—	—	—	—	—
2022–23	Leksands IF	SHL	42	1	5	6	47	3	1	0	1	4
2023–24	Texas Stars	AHL	16	1	6	7	34	5	0	1	1	4
2023–24	Rögle BK	SHL	29	2	2	4	28	15	1	5	6	8
2024–25	Texas Stars	AHL	28	3	6	9	36	—	—	—	—	—
2024–25	Dallas Stars	NHL	38	4	5	9	41	18	0	1	1	28
2025–26	Dallas Stars	NHL	50	4	4	8	37	6	0	0	0	4
SHL totals			100	4	9	13	91	18	2	5	7	12
NHL totals			88	8	9	17	78	24	0	1	1	32

=== International ===
Year	Team	Event	Result	GP	G	A	Pts	PIM
2021	Switzerland	U18	8th	5	1	1	2	6
2021	Switzerland	HG18	8th	4	0	1	1	0
2023	Switzerland	WJC	7th	5	0	2	2	2
Junior totals				14	1	4	5	8

Awards and achievements
Preceded by Wyatt Johnston	Dallas Stars first-round draft pick 2022	Succeeded by Emil Hemming
