= David Špaček =

Czech-American ice hockey player (born 2003)

- Born: 18 February 2003 (age 23) Columbus, Ohio, U.S.
- Height: 6 ft 0 in (183 cm)
- Weight: 190 lb (86 kg; 13 st 8 lb)
- Position: Defence
- Shoots: Right
- NHL team: Minnesota Wild
- National team: Czech Republic
- NHL draft: 153rd overall, 2022; Minnesota Wild
- Playing career: 2023–present

David Špaček (born 18 February 2003) is a Czech–American professional ice hockey player who is a defenceman for the Minnesota Wild of the National Hockey League (NHL). He was drafted by the Wild, in the fifth round, 153rd overall, in the 2022 NHL entry draft.

== Playing career ==
Špaček played youth hockey in the Czech Republic, before playing two seasons with the Sherbrooke Phoenix of the Quebec Major Junior Hockey League (QMJHL). During the 2021–22 season, he recorded 12 goals and 38 assists in 57 games. Following the season he was awarded the Raymond Lagacé Trophy. During the 2022–23 season, he recorded 13 goals and 44 assists in 58 games.

On 8 July 2022, Špaček was drafted in the fifth round, 153rd overall, by the Minnesota Wild in the 2022 NHL entry draft. On 6 March 2023, he signed a three-year, entry-level contract with the Wild.

He began the 2023–24 season with the Iowa Wild of the AHL. On 29 November 2023, he was reassigned to the Iowa Heartlanders of the ECHL. Prior to being reassigned, he recorded one goal and three points in ten games with the Wild. On 4 December 2023, he was recalled by the Wild. Prior to being recalled he recorded two goals in three games with the Heartlanders. He finished his first professional season in North America with three goals and nine assists in 61 games for the Wild.

Špaček played 72 games for the Iowa Wild in the 2024–25 season, recording 31 points. After scoring 19 points in 35 games to start the 2025–26 season, he was recalled to the Wild on 14 January 2026.

== International play ==
Medal record

Men's ice hockey

Representing Czech Republic

World Championships
Gold medal – first place	2024 Czech Republic	

World Junior Championships
Silver medal – second place	2023 Canada	

Špaček represented Czech Republic at the 2022 World Junior Ice Hockey Championships where he recorded one assist in seven games. He again represented the Czech Republic at the 2023 World Junior Ice Hockey Championships where he recorded three goals and five assists in seven games and won a silver medal. He tied for third in tournament in scoring by a defenseman and averaged 19:46 minutes of time on ice per game.

On 3 May 2024, he was named to the Czech Republic roster for the 2024 IIHF World Championship. He recorded five assists in ten games and won a gold medal.

== Personal life ==
Špaček is the son of former NHL player Jaroslav Špaček. He was born in Columbus, Ohio, while his father was playing for the Columbus Blue Jackets.

== Career statistics ==
=== Regular season and playoffs ===
			Regular season					Playoffs
Season	Team	League	GP	G	A	Pts	PIM	GP	G	A	Pts	PIM
2021–22	Sherbrooke Phoenix	QMJHL	57	12	38	50	44	11	2	11	13	8
2022–23	Sherbrooke Phoenix	QMJHL	58	13	44	57	30	14	3	5	8	8
2023–24	Iowa Heartlanders	ECHL	3	2	0	2	0	—	—	—	—	—
2023–24	Iowa Wild	AHL	61	3	9	12	21	—	—	—	—	—
2024–25	Iowa Wild	AHL	72	4	27	31	31	—	—	—	—	—
2025–26	Iowa Wild	AHL	59	7	29	36	16	—	—	—	—	—
2025–26	Minnesota Wild	NHL	2	0	0	0	0	—	—	—	—	—
NHL totals			2	0	0	0	0	—	—	—	—	—

=== International ===
Year	Team	Event	Result	GP	G	A	Pts	PIM
2021	Czech Republic	U18	7th	3	0	0	0	0
2022	Czechia	WJC	4th	7	0	1	1	4
2023	Czechia	WJC	2nd place, silver medalist(s)	7	3	5	8	0
2024	Czechia	WC	1st place, gold medalist(s)	10	0	5	5	0
2025	Czechia	WC	6th	8	0	2	2	2
2026	Czechia	OG	8th	5	0	1	1	0
Junior totals				17	3	6	9	4
Senior totals				23	0	8	8	2
