= Adam Engström =

Swedish ice hockey player (born 2003)

- Born: 17 November 2003 (age 22) Järna, Sweden
- Height: 188 cm (6 ft 2 in)
- Weight: 88 kg (194 lb; 13 st 12 lb)
- Position: Defence
- Shoots: Left
- NHL team Former teams: Montreal Canadiens; Djurgårdens IF; Rögle BK
- NHL draft: 92nd overall, 2022; Montreal Canadiens
- Playing career: 2022–present

Adam Engström (born 17 November 2003) is a Swedish professional ice hockey player who is a defenceman for the Montreal Canadiens of the National Hockey League (NHL). He was selected in the third round, 92nd overall, by the Canadiens in the 2022 NHL entry draft.

== Playing career ==
=== Sweden ===
Beginning his junior hockey career with Djurgården Jr. of the J20 Nationell, Engström joined the senior team of Djurgården in the Swedish Hockey League (SHL) at the end of the 2021–22 season.

Following his first full SHL season in which he posted 16 points across 43 games played with Rögle BK, he was reassigned to the foregoing's junior ranks and captured the Anton Cup as league champions. In 2023–24, Engström amassed 22 points en route to his team finishing as runners-up for the Le Mat Trophy, while also taking strides to improve on his defensive acumen. On 3 May 2024, he was signed to an entry-level contract by draft team the Montreal Canadiens.

=== North America ===
Initially joining the Canadiens' American Hockey League (AHL) affiliate Laval Rocket for the 2024–25 season, Engström ranked first among Rocket rookie blueliners in scoring, as well as placing sixth league wide. After a strong start to the 2025–26 campaign in which he tied a franchise record with five points in a single game on 22 November 2025, he was recalled by Montreal and made his NHL debut on 26 November in a game against the Utah Mammoth. Appearing in a total of 12 games with the Canadiens being held pointless over that span, Engström was reassigned to Laval on 8 January 2026. A week later, he was named to the AHL All-Star Game for the first time in his professional career. Joining the Canadiens again in late March, Engström drew into the team's lineup on 7 April versus the Florida Panthers where he registered his first career NHL point with an assist.

During preseason competition in which there was perceived to be significant jockeying for spots with the Canadiens ahead of the 2026–27 season, it was announced on 27 September that Engström had made the team's final roster. He recorded his first career NHL goal on 5 November 2026 in a game versus the Utah Mammoth.

== International play ==
Engström first represented his country on the international stage as part of their national under-19 team during the 2021–22 season. Thereafter, he was named to the national under-20 team for the 2023 World Junior Ice Hockey Championships and ultimately finished in fourth place following an overtime loss to Team USA in the bronze medal game.

== Career statistics ==
			Regular season					Playoffs
Season	Team	League	GP	G	A	Pts	PIM	GP	G	A	Pts	PIM
2020–21	Djurgården J20	J20	4	0	0	0	0	—	—	—	—	—
2021–22	Djurgården J20	J20	45	8	20	28	0	6	2	5	7	2
2021–22	Djurgårdens IF	SHL	1	0	0	0	0	—	—	—	—	—
2022–23	Rögle BK Jr.	J20	7	4	9	13	8	4	0	1	1	0
2022–23	Rögle BK	SHL	43	6	10	16	14	9	3	2	5	4
2023–24	Rögle BK	SHL	51	4	18	22	4	15	0	4	4	8
2024–25	Laval Rocket	AHL	66	5	22	27	40	13	0	5	5	10
2025–26	Laval Rocket	AHL	45	10	24	34	18	2	0	0	0	0
2025–26	Montreal Canadiens	NHL	15	0	1	1	8	—	—	—	—	—
NHL totals			15	0	1	1	8	—	—	—	—	—

=== International ===
Year	Team	Event	Result	GP	G	A	Pts	PIM
2023	Sweden	WJC	4th	7	1	2	3	2
Junior totals				7	1	2	3	2

== Awards and honours ==
Award	Year	Ref
J20
Anton Cup	2023	
AHL
All-Star Game	2026	
Top Prospects Team	2026	
