= Logan Stankoven =

Canadian ice hockey player (born 2003)

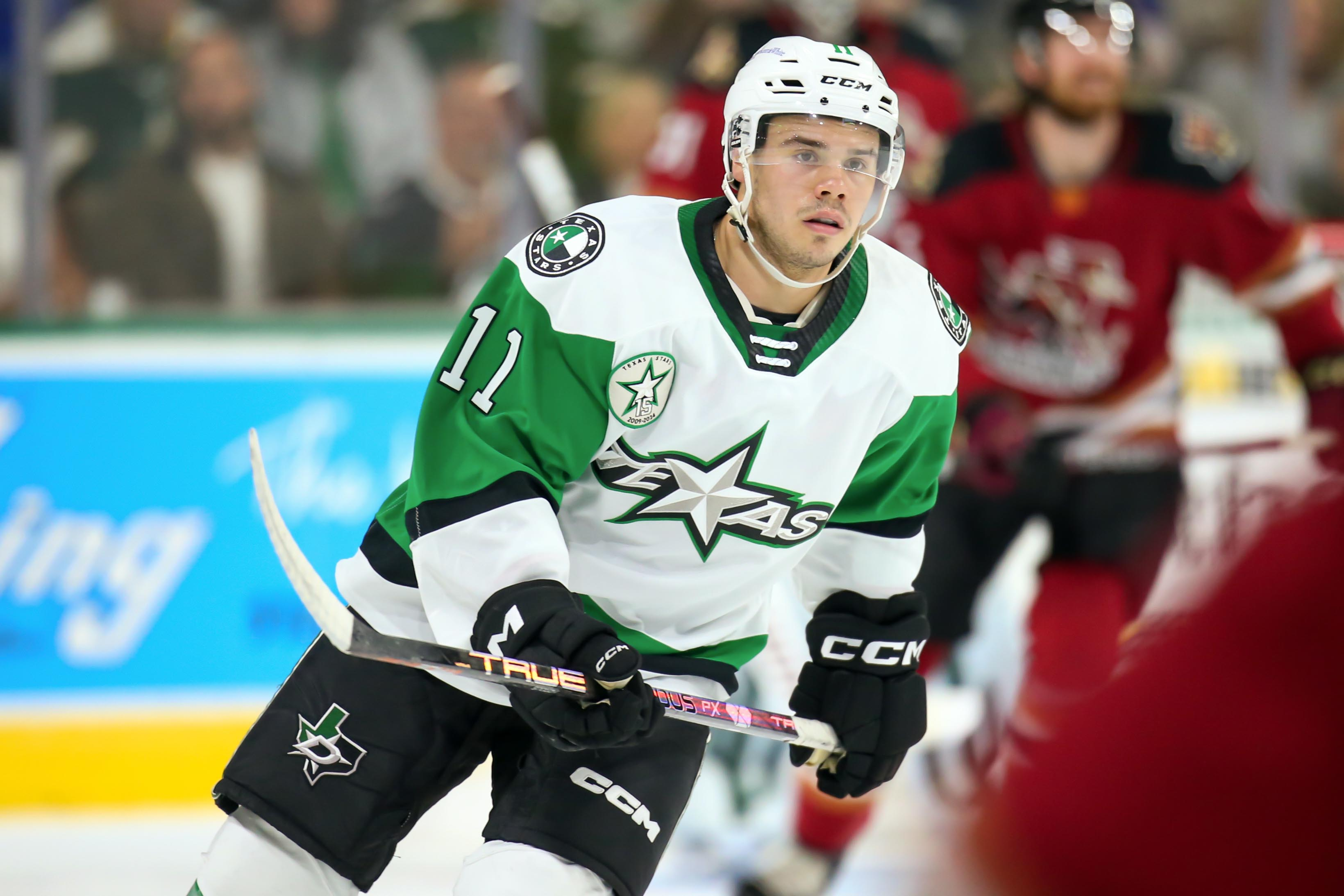
- Stankoven with the Texas Stars in 2023
- Born: February 26, 2003 (age 23) Kamloops, British Columbia, Canada
- Height: 5 ft 8 in (173 cm)
- Weight: 165 lb (75 kg; 11 st 11 lb)
- Position: Forward
- Shoots: Right
- NHL team Former teams: Carolina Hurricanes; Dallas Stars
- NHL draft: 47th overall, 2021; Dallas Stars
- Playing career: 2023–present

Logan Stankoven (born February 26, 2003) is a Canadian professional ice hockey player who is a forward for the Carolina Hurricanes of the National Hockey League (NHL). He was drafted in the second round, 47th overall, by the Dallas Stars in the 2021 NHL entry draft. Stankoven won the Stanley Cup with the Hurricanes in 2026.

== Playing career ==
=== Amateur ===
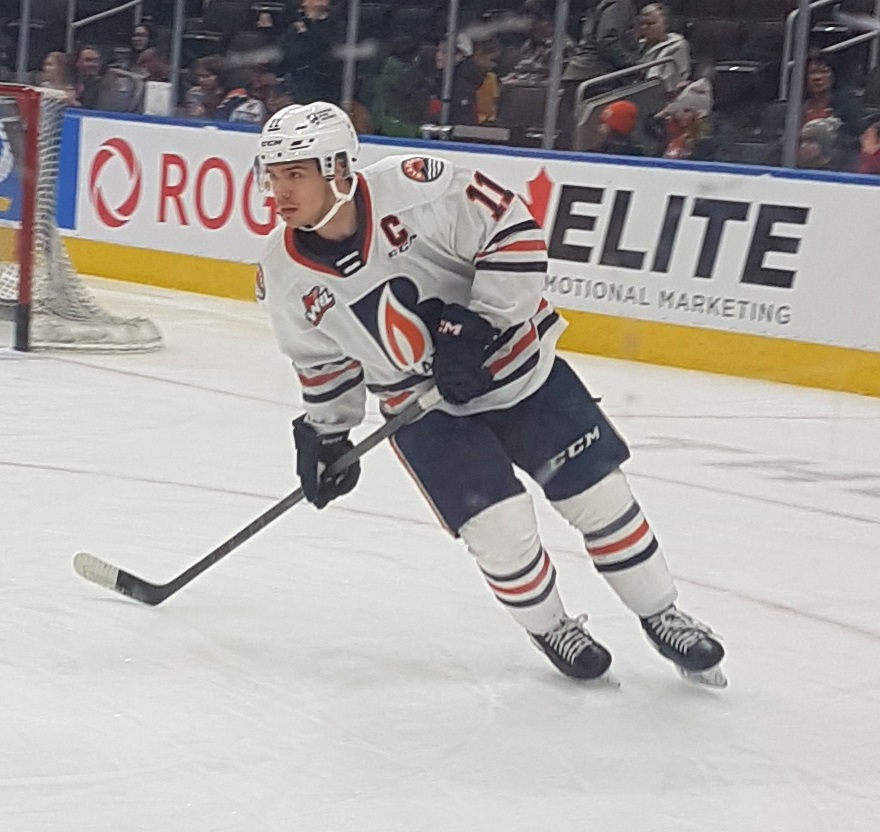
Stankoven with the Kamloops Blazers in 2023.

In his first full major junior season in 2019–20, Stankoven recorded 29 goals 19 assists for 48 points in 59 games with the Kamloops Blazers of the Western Hockey League (WHL). He missed an opportunity to become the first 16-year-old player to score 30 goals in a season since Nolan Patrick in 2014–15 as a result of the league shutting down early with five games left on Kamloops' schedule due to the onset of the COVID-19 pandemic.

Following his selection by the Dallas Stars in the second round, 47th overall, of the 2021 NHL entry draft, Stankoven was signed to a three-year, entry-level contract on September 29, 2021.

Stankoven won several awards for his performance in the 2021–22 season for Kamloops, in which he played 59 games, scoring 45 goals and recording 59 assists. He was third in points in the league that year, and fourth in goals. He was named a First Team All-Star in the BC Division, also receiving the Four Broncos Memorial Trophy as the WHL's best player and the Brad Hornung Trophy as its most sportsmanlike player. Stankoven later received the David Branch Player of the Year Award from the Canadian Hockey League (CHL), winning out over the Quebec Major Junior Hockey League (QMJHL) and Ontario Hockey League (OHL) most valuable player candidates. In the 2022 WHL playoffs, Stankoven led all players with 17 goals and 31 points. The Blazers reached the Western Conference Finals, where they were ultimately defeated by the Seattle Thunderbirds, bringing their postseason to an end.

In the 2022–23 season, Stankoven recorded 34 goals and 63 assists, coming fourth in WHL scoring despite playing in only 48 of 68 scheduled games. He was a finalist for the Four Broncos Memorial Trophy for the second consecutive season. In recognition of his efforts to raise over $50,000 for Canadian Blood Services and Kamloops' Royal Inland Hospital, Stankoven received the Doug Wickenheiser Memorial Trophy as the WHL's humanitarian of the year. He was subsequently also named to the CHL's First All-Star Team.

Entering the 2023 WHL playoffs as contenders, the Blazers were defeated by the Thunderbirds in the Western Conference finals for the second consecutive postseason. However, as Kamloops was hosting the 2023 Memorial Cup and thus automatically qualified for the nationwide tournament. On the prospect of winning the Memorial Cup on home ice, Stankoven remarked "it would be a nice way to kind of cap things off." The Blazers were ultimately eliminated by the Peterborough Petes in the quarterfinals. Despite only playing four games, Stankoven led the entire tournament in scoring with nine points, earning the Ed Chynoweth Trophy. He incurred no penalties in the course of doing so, and was also honoured with the George Parsons Trophy as the tournament's most sportsmanlike player.

=== Professional ===
==== Dallas Stars (2023–2025) ====
Stankoven began the 2023–24 season with the Dallas' American Hockey League (AHL) affiliate, the Texas Stars. In February, he was Texas' representative to the 2024 AHL All-Star Game. On February 24, 2024, Dallas recalled Stankoven. At the time of his call-up, he was leading the AHL in scoring with 24 goals and 33 assists for 57 points in 47 games. Stankoven made his NHL debut in a 2–1 win over the Carolina Hurricanes on February 24, 2024. On February 26, his 21st birthday, Stankoven scored his first career NHL goal and assist in a 3–2 overtime loss against the New York Islanders. On March 5, he recorded two goals and two assists in a 7–6 win against the San Jose Sharks. Despite missing the final third of the AHL season, he remained the rookie scoring leader at season's end, and received the Dudley "Red" Garrett Memorial Award as AHL rookie of the year. As well, he was named to both the league's All-Rookie Team and its First All-Star Team.

In the following 2024–25 season, Stankoven opened the season on the Stars roster, and posted 9 goals and 29 points through 59 regular season games.

==== Carolina Hurricanes (2025–) ====
At the NHL trade deadline, Stankoven along with two conditional first-round draft picks (both top 10 protected), were traded by the Stars to the Carolina Hurricanes in exchange for forward Mikko Rantanen on March 7, 2025. Stankoven signed an 8 year, $48 million contract extension with the Hurricanes beginning in the 2026–27 season on July 1, 2025.

He won the 2026 Stanley Cup with the Hurricanes, with a 3–0 win over the Vegas Golden Knights on June 14, 2026. Stankoven got one assist in the deciding game, and led the Hurricanes with 11 goals in the 2026 playoffs.

== International play ==
Medal record

Men's ice hockey

Representing Canada

World Junior Championships
Gold medal – first place	2022 Canada	
Gold medal – first place	2023 Canada	

World U18 Championships
Gold medal – first place	2021 United States	

Stankoven was a member of the Canada national under-18 team in the 2021 IIHF World U18 Championships. He scored the game-winning goal in Canada's 5–3 victory over Russia in the gold medal game.

Initially named to Canada national junior team for the 2022 World Junior Championships that was scheduled to be played in December 2021 and January 2022, the tournament was cancelled due to the COVID-19 pandemic after Stankoven had played only one game. However, he rejoined the team when the tournament was rescheduled for the following summer, winning gold. With four goals and six assists in the seven-game tournament, he was named one of the team's three best players.

On December 12, 2022, Stankoven was again named to Canada national junior team to compete at the 2023 World Junior Championships. After the team opened the tournament with a loss to the Czech Republic, the forward lines were reorganized with Stankoven centering Connor Bedard and Joshua Roy. The Bedard/Stankoven/Roy line became the backbone of the team through the rest of the tournament, and the three were named Canada's three best players following the semifinals victory over United States in which they scored four of Canada's six goals. In the final, Canada defeated the Czech Republic in a rematch, winning their second consecutive gold medal.

== Career statistics ==
=== Regular season and playoffs ===
Bold indicates led league

			Regular season					Playoffs
Season	Team	League	GP	G	A	Pts	PIM	GP	G	A	Pts	PIM
2018–19	Kamloops Blazers	WHL	7	0	1	1	2	6	1	1	2	0
2019–20	Kamloops Blazers	WHL	59	29	19	48	10	—	—	—	—	—
2020–21	Kamloops Blazers	WHL	6	7	3	10	0	—	—	—	—	—
2021–22	Kamloops Blazers	WHL	59	45	59	104	16	17	**17**	14	**31**	8
2022–23	Kamloops Blazers	WHL	48	34	63	97	17	14	10	20	**30**	4
2023–24	Texas Stars	AHL	47	24	33	57	28	—	—	—	—	—
2023–24	Dallas Stars	NHL	24	6	8	14	4	19	3	5	8	2
2024–25	Dallas Stars	NHL	59	9	20	29	6	—	—	—	—	—
2024–25	Carolina Hurricanes	NHL	19	5	4	9	12	15	5	3	8	2
2025–26	Carolina Hurricanes	NHL	81	21	23	44	25	19	11	5	16	8
NHL totals			183	41	55	96	47	53	19	13	32	12

=== International ===
Year	Team	Event	Result	GP	G	A	Pts	PIM
2019	Canada Red	U17	5th	5	4	0	4	2
2021	Canada	U18	1st place, gold medalist(s)	7	4	4	8	0
2022	Canada	WJC	1st place, gold medalist(s)	7	4	6	10	2
2023	Canada	WJC	1st place, gold medalist(s)	7	3	8	11	0
Junior totals				26	15	18	33	4

== Awards and honours ==
Award	Year	Ref
CHL
David Branch Player of the Year Award	2022	
Ed Chynoweth Trophy	2023	
George Parsons Trophy	2023	
First All-Star Team	2023	
WHL
Four Broncos Memorial Trophy	2022	
Brad Hornung Trophy	2022	
Doug Wickenheiser Memorial Trophy	2023	
AHL
All-Star Game	2024	
All-Rookie Team	2024	
First All-Star Team	2024	
Dudley "Red" Garrett Memorial Award	2024	
NHL
Stanley Cup champion	2026	
