= 2023 World Junior Ice Hockey Championships =

2023 edition of the World Junior Ice Hockey Championships

2023 IIHF World Junior Championships

Tournament details
- Host country: Canada
- Venue(s): Scotiabank Centre; Avenir Centre (in 2 host cities)
- Dates: December 26, 2022 – January 5, 2023
- Teams: 10

Final positions
- Champions: Canada (20th title)
- Runners-up: Czechia
- Third place: United States
- Fourth place: Sweden

Tournament statistics
- Games played: 30
- Goals scored: 216 (7.2 per game)
- Attendance: 221,904 (7,397 per game)
- Scoring leader: (Canada) Connor Bedard (23 points)

Awards
- MVP: (Canada) Connor Bedard

The 2023 World Junior Ice Hockey Championships (2023 WJHC) was the 47th edition of the Ice Hockey World Junior Championship, held from 26 December 2022 to 5 January 2023. It was won by Canada, in overtime of the gold-medal game. Czechia won the silver, their first medal since 2005.

== Background ==
The relegation round was revived, after a two-year hiatus due to the 2021 Division I, II, and III tournaments having been cancelled, and in 2022, both Russia and Belarus were expelled from the competition.

== Top Division ==
=== Venues ===
Originally, Novosibirsk and Omsk in Russia were selected as host cities, however Russia's hosting rights were revoked in February 2022 due to Russian invasion of Ukraine. Instead, hosting rights were given to Halifax and Moncton in Canada. This was the 18th time Canada hosted the competition, and the third consecutive tournament held on Canada's soil.

On May 23, 2018, the IIHF announced Novosibirsk, Russia, as host city. Novosibirsk was to host Group A matches, while the city of Omsk was to host Group B matches.

In February 2022, in condemnation of the Russian invasion of Ukraine, the International Olympic Committee (IOC) called for Russia to be stripped of hosting rights to all international sporting events. Russia's hosting of the 2023 World Junior Ice Hockey Championships was scheduled to be discussed in a meeting of the IIHF council on February 28, 2022. The IIHF suspended Russia and Belarus from international ice hockey until further notice, and stripped Russia of its hosting rights for the World Junior Championships.

In late-March 2022, Sportsnet journalist Jeff Marek reported that the IIHF had considered Canada as a possible host country for the tournament, which would make it the third consecutive World Junior Championship to be hosted in the country (the previous two tournaments have been hosted in Alberta with Edmonton as the main host city, but were held in a "bubble" behind closed doors and postponed to August 2022 respectively due to the COVID-19 pandemic). On May 5, the IIHF and Hockey Canada announced that Halifax and Moncton would be the hosts of the tournament, beating out announced bids by Regina/Saskatoon, Ottawa/Quebec City, and London/Waterloo. It marks the 20th anniversary of Halifax's previous hosting of the tournament in 2003.

Halifax	2023 World Junior Ice Hockey Championships is located in Canada	Moncton
Scotiabank Centre Capacity: 10,595	2023 World Junior Ice Hockey Championships is located in Canada	Avenir Centre Capacity: 8,800

=== Match officials ===
The following officials were assigned by the International Ice Hockey Federation to officiate the 2023 World Junior Championships.

Referees

- (Canada) Michael Campbell
- (Canada) Graeden Hamilton
- (Sweden) Andreas Harnebring
- (Slovakia) Tomáš Hronský
- (Germany) Marc Iwert
- (Sweden) Richard Magnusson
- (Canada) Mathieu Menniti
- (Finland) Anssi Salonen
- (United States) Peter Schlittenhardt
- (Czech Republic) Jakub Šindel
- (Switzerland) Michaël Tscherrig
- (United States) Riley Yerkovich

Linesmen

- (Switzerland) Dario Fuchs
- (France) Clément Goncalves
- (United States) Brandon Grillo
- (Finland) Onni Hautamäki
- (Czech Republic) David Klouček
- (Canada) Spencer Knox
- (Slovakia) Daniel Konc
- (Germany) Patrick Laguzov
- (Sweden) Daniel Persson
- (United States) John Waleski
- (Canada) Tarrington Wyonzek

=== Preliminary round ===
==== Seeding ====
The groups were announced on August 17, 2022, with teams being grouped based on rankings of performance over the previous five tournaments.

Group A
(Scotiabank Centre)

- Canada
- Sweden
- Czechia
- Germany
- Austria

Group B
(Avenir Centre)

- United States
- Finland
- Switzerland
- Slovakia
- Latvia

==== Group A ====
Isak Rosén began the scoring in Group A as Sweden defeated Austria 11–0, with 6 of their goals coming in the second period. Canada lost 5–2 to Czechia in their biggest World Juniors loss since 2020 when they lost 6–0 to Russia. Adam Engström of Sweden scored the lone goal in a tight match to beat Germany 1–0. Austria went scoreless once again against Czechia, recording only 8 shots in a 9–0 defeat. Canada regained their form as they defeated Germany in a convincing 11–2 victory, with Connor Bedard earning 7 points, tying a Canadian World Juniors record. Despite Czechia scoring early in the game, goals from Fabian Wagner and Ludvig Jansson gave the lead to the Swedes. Jiří Ticháček scored an equalizer in the 54th minute, taking the match to overtime. Ludvig Jansson got the winner in the second minute of overtime, earning his second goal of the match. Canada defeated Austria 11–0, with Connor Bedard having 6 points and Austria remaining scoreless after 3 matches. Canada dominated the game with 47 shots, while Austria could only manage 12. Germany defeated Austria 4–2, and despite Austria scoring their first goals of the tournament, they were consequently eliminated to the relegation round. Germany advanced to the quarter-finals for the third consecutive time. Czechia beat Germany in a decisive 8–1 victory, earning Czechia a total of 10 points in the group and winning them Group A. Canada defeated Sweden 6–1, passing Sweden in the standings and finishing second in the group, behind Czechia.

Pos	Team	Pld	W	OTW	OTL	L	GF	GA	GD	Pts	Qualification
1	Czechia	4	3	0	1	0	24	6	+18	10	Quarterfinals
2	Canada (H)	4	3	0	0	1	29	8	+21	9	Quarterfinals
3	Sweden	4	2	1	0	1	16	7	+9	8	Quarterfinals
4	Germany	4	1	0	0	3	7	22	−15	3	Quarterfinals
5	Austria	4	0	0	0	4	2	35	−33	0	Relegation playoff

Source: IIHF
(H) Host

26 December 2022; 14:30	Sweden	11–0 (2–0, 6–0, 3–0)	Austria	Scotiabank Centre, Halifax; Attendance: 7,274

Game reference

Carl Lindbom
Goalies
Thomas Pfarrmaier
Benedikt Oschgan
Referees:
(Canada) Michael Campbell
(Canada) Graeden Hamilton
Linesmen:
(United States) John Waleski
(Canada) Tarrington Wyonzek

Rosén – 13:17	1–0
Bystedt (Rosén) – 17:49	2–0
Rosén (Carlsson, Bystedt) – 20:48	3–0
Robertsson (E. Pettersson, Jansson) – 22:51	4–0
Oscarson (O. Pettersson) (SH) – 27:16	5–0
Lekkerimäki (Wagner, Engström) – 30:28	6–0
Öhgren (Östlund, Engström) – 32:33	7–0
Odelius (Sternbjorg, Wagner) – 33:23	8–0
Wagner (Lekkerimäki, Lindbom) – 42:45	9–0
Bystedt (Carlsson, Jansson) (PP) – 44:06	10–0
O. Pettersson (Sjöholm, Jansson) – 53:50	11–0

10 min
Penalties
14 min
51
Shots
13

26 December 2022; 19:30	Czechia	5–2 (2–1, 3–1, 0–0)	Canada	Scotiabank Centre, Halifax; Attendance: 10,030

Game reference

Tomáš Suchánek
Goalies
Benjamin Gaudreau
Thomas Milic
Referees:
(Slovakia) Tomas Hronsky
(Switzerland) Michael Tscherrig
Linesmen:
(Canada) Spencer Knox
(Slovakia) Daniel Konc

	0–1	10:33 – Wright (Zellweger, Guenther) (PP)
Špaček (Svozil, Brabenec) – 17:48	1–1
Moravec (Měchura, Marcel) – 18:23	2–1
Svozil (Špaček, Šalé) – 20:44	3–1
	3–2	21:29 – Bedard (Wright, Korchinski)
Chmelař (Jiříček) (PP) – 28:14	4–2
Menšík (Kos, Suchánek) (PP) – 28:47	5–2

6 min
Penalties
35 min
27
Shots
38

27 December 2022; 14:30	Germany	0–1 (0–1, 0–0, 0–0)	Sweden	Scotiabank Centre, Halifax; Attendance: 7,632

Game reference
Nikita Quapp	Goalies	Carl Lindbom	Referees: (Canada) Michael Campbell (Slovakia) Tomas Hronsky; Linesmen: (Germany) Patrick Laguzov (Sweden) Daniel Persson
0–1 / 19:38 – Engström (Bystedt)			Referees: (Canada) Michael Campbell (Slovakia) Tomas Hronsky; Linesmen: (Germany) Patrick Laguzov (Sweden) Daniel Persson
8 min	Penalties	10 min	Referees: (Canada) Michael Campbell (Slovakia) Tomas Hronsky; Linesmen: (Germany) Patrick Laguzov (Sweden) Daniel Persson
28	Shots	44	Referees: (Canada) Michael Campbell (Slovakia) Tomas Hronsky; Linesmen: (Germany) Patrick Laguzov (Sweden) Daniel Persson

27 December 2022; 19:30	Austria	0–9 (0–3, 0–4, 0–2)	Czechia	Scotiabank Centre, Halifax; Attendance: 7,105

Game reference

Michael Sicher
Goalies
Tomáš Suchánek
Referees:
(Sweden) Andreas Harnebring
(United States) Riley Yerkovich
Linesmen:
(Canada) Spencer Knox
(United States) John Waleski

0–1	03:50 – Brabenec (Svozil, Suchánek) (PP)
0–2	16:26 – Kulich (Svozil, Špaček)
0–3	18:39 – Hauser (Šapovaliv, Měchura)
0–4	21:05 – Szturc
0–5	22:56 – Čech (Šalé, Šapovaliv)
0–6	28:16 – Kulich (Šalé, Marcel) (PP)
0–7	30:02 – Szturc (Chlemař, Suchánek)
0–8	40:08 – Kulich (Šapovaliv, Jiříček)
0–9	54:13 – Špaček (Svozil, Šapovaliv)

12 min
Penalties
10 min
8
Shots
47

28 December 2022; 19:30	Canada	11–2 (3–1, 6–0, 2–1)	Germany	Scotiabank Centre, Halifax; Attendance: 10,263

Game reference

Thomas Milic
Goalies
Simon Wolf
Rihards Babulis
Referees:
(Sweden) Andreas Harnebring
(United States) Riley Yerkovich
Linesmen:
(Slovakia) Daniel Konc
(Sweden) Daniel Persson

Guenther (Bedard, Zellweger) (PP) – 06:46	1–0
	1–1	11:08 – Kechter (Bader, Sinn)
Wright (PP) – 13:21	2–1
Bedard (Stankoven, Roy) – 17:26	3–1
Bedard (Stankoven, Clarke) – 21:02	4–1
Bedard (Wright, Zellweger) (PP) – 33:57	5–1
Guenther (Bedard, Zellweger) (PP) – 36:48	6–1
Clarke (Fantilli, Dach) (PP) – 38:08	7–1
Guenther (Bedard) (PP) – 39:24	8–1
Stankoven (PP) – 39:56	9–1
Ostapchuk (Korchinski, Bankier) – 41:22	10–1
Roy (Bedard, Korchinski) – 50:56	11–1
	11–2	54:25 – Sinn (Oswald, Krening) (PP)

10 min
Penalties
37 min
52
Shots
16

29 December 2022; 14:30	Sweden	3–2 OT (0–0, 2–1, 0–1) (OT: 1–0)	Czechia	Scotiabank Centre, Halifax; Attendance: 9,140

Game reference

Carl Lindbom
Goalies
Tomáš Suchánek
Referees:
(Canada) Mathieu Menniti
(United States) Peter Schlittenhardt
Linesmen:
(Finland) Onni Hautamäki
(Czech Republic) David Kloucek

	0–1	23:12 – Jiříček (Hauser, Měchura)
Wagner – 25:28	1–1
Jansson (O. Pettersson, Robertsson) – 26:58	2–1
	2–2	54:08 – Ticháček (Šapovaliv, Jiříček)
Jansson (Lekkerimäki, Östlund) – 61:35	3–2

6 min
Penalties
8 min
24
Shots
35

29 December 2022; 19:30	Austria	0–11 (0–3, 0–4, 0–4)	Canada	Scotiabank Centre, Halifax; Attendance: 10,170

Game reference

Benedikt Oschgan
Goalies
Benjamin Gaudreau
Referees:
(Germany) Marc Iwert
(Czech Republic) Jakub Šindel
Linesmen:
(Canada) Shawn Oliver
(United States) John Waleski

0–1	14:08 – Guenther (Othmann, Bedard) (PP)
0–2	15:53 – Dean (Gaucher, Fantilli)
0–3	18:19 – Wright (Bedard, Zellweger) (PP)
0–4	22:37 – Roy (Clarke, Bedard)
0–5	23:08 – Bedard (Stankoven)
0–6	25:35 – Allan (Schaefer, Ostapchuk)
0–7	34:32 – Stankoven (Bedard, Del Mastro)
0–8	42:15 – Fantilli (Roy, Gaucher) (PP)
0–9	51:58 – Gaucher (Dach, Matier)
0–10	53:16 – Bedard (Stankoven)
0–11	58:07 – Hinds (Stankoven, Roy)

6 min
Penalties
4 min
12
Shots
47

30 December 2022; 17:30	Germany	4–2 (1–0, 3–1, 0–1)	Austria	Scotiabank Centre, Halifax; Attendance: 7,586

Game reference

Nikita Quapp
Goalies
Thomas Pfarrmaier
Referees:
(Canada) Mathieu Meniti
(Czech Republic) Jakub Šindel
Linesmen:
(United States) Brandon Grillo
(Czech Republic) David Klouček

Krening (Lutz, Kechter) – 18:01	1–0
Van der Linde (Roßmy) – 21:34	2–0
T. Heigl (N. Heigl, Bader) – 26:57	3–0
	3–1	29:24 – Scherzer (Rohrer, Auer) (PP)
Kechter (Krening, Lutz) – 36:38	4–1
	4–2	46:00 – Dobnig (Van Ee) (EA)

6 min
Penalties
6 min
27
Shots
33

31 December 2022; 14:30	Czechia	8–1 (2–0, 3–1, 3–0)	Germany	Scotiabank Centre, Halifax; Attendance: 8,454

Game reference

Tomáš Suchánek
Goalies
Nikita Quapp
Simon Wolf
Referees:
(Sweden) Richard Magnusson
(United States) Peter Schlittenhardt
Linesmen:
(Slovakia) Daniel Konc
(Canada) Shawn Oliver

Špaček (Svozil, Chmelař) (PP) – 04:58	1–0
Szturc (Brabenec) – 17:04	2–0
Chmelař (Brabenec, Moravec) – 29:38	3–0
	3–1	32:35 – Oswald (Sinn, Bettahar)
Ryšavý (Szturc, Menšík) – 36:27	4–1
Hauser (Špaček, Marcel) – 37:14	5–1
Chmelař (Szturc, Brabenec) – 44:33	6–1
Kos (Ryšavý, Sapoušek) – 45:02	7–1
Ticháček (Ryšavý, Kos) – 57:23	8–1

8 min
Penalties
4 min
54
Shots
19

31 December 2022; 19:30	Canada	5–1 (3–1, 0–0, 2–0)	Sweden	Scotiabank Centre, Halifax; Attendance: 10,301

Game reference

Thomas Milic
Goalies
Carl Lindbom
Referees:
(Finland) Anssi Salonen
(Switzerland) Michael Tscherrig
Linesmen:
(United States) Brandon Grillo
(Finland) Onni Hautamäki

Roy (Bedard, Clarke) – 00:57	1–0
Othmann (Wright, Bedard) (PP) – 02:08	2–0
Hinds (Stankoven, Bedard) – 11:45	3–0
	3–1	16:21 – Jansson (Rosén, Bystedt) (PP)
Othmann (Guenther, Del Mastro) – 40:35	4–1
Korchinski (Bedard, Allan) – 52:42	5–1

33 min
Penalties
10 min
44
Shots
23

==== Group B ====
Finland and Switzerland began the tournament tied by the end of the third period, sending the match to overtime. Attilio Biasca scored a long-range goal to give Switzerland 2 points. Despite being tied for most of the match, the United States put 3 goals past Latvian Patriks Bērziņš in the third period, winning the match 5–2. Slovakia lost 5–2 to Finland in their first game of the tournament, despite having more shots than the Finns. Finland scored 3 goals in the second period alone. Rodwin Dionicio scored in the 58th minute to send Switzerland to their second consecutive overtime against Latvia. They failed to convert a chance, however, and the match went to a shootout. Liekit Reichle won the match for the Swiss after getting one past the Latvian goaltender. Slovakia defeated the United States 6–3 after Alex Čiernik scored a late goal, taking advantage of the U.S.'s open net. Finland scored 3 against Latvia in regulation time, while the Finnish goaltender, Jani Lampinen, kept a 31-save shutout. The United States recovered from their disappointing loss after beating Switzerland 5–1, with Jimmy Snuggerud scoring two. Slovakia defeated Latvia 3–0, sending Slovakia to the quarter-finals and sending Latvia to the relegation round. By the end of regulation time, Switzerland and Slovakia tied at a score of 3–3. Despite Switzerland winning another shootout, their placement was not affected, and finished 4th place in the group. Both teams qualified for the quarter-finals. The United States won the group after defeating Finland 6–2. Although they lost the match, Finland still finished above Slovakia due to their head-to-head result.

Pos	Team	Pld	W	OTW	OTL	L	GF	GA	GD	Pts	Qualification
1	United States	4	3	0	0	1	19	11	+8	9	Quarterfinals
2	Finland	4	2	0	1	1	12	11	+1	7 (Note: Finland 5–2 Slovakia)	Quarterfinals
3	Slovakia	4	2	0	1	1	14	12	+2	7	Quarterfinals
4	Switzerland	4	0	3	0	1	11	12	−1	6	Quarterfinals
5	Latvia	4	0	0	1	3	4	14	−10	1	Relegation playoff

Source: IIHF
Notes:

26 December 2022; 12:00	Finland	2–3 OT (0–0, 1–1, 1–1) (OT: 0–1)	Switzerland	Avenir Centre, Moncton; Attendance: 4,465

Game reference

Aku Koskenvuo
Goalies
Kevin Pasche
Referees:
(Sweden) Richard Magnusson
(United States) Peter Schlittenhardt
Linesmen:
(Finland) Onni Hautamaki
(Czech Republic) David Klouček

K. Kapanen (Väisänen, Paivarinta) – 22:24	1–0
	1–1	32:54 – Canonica (Taibel)
	1–2	44:43 – Jabola (Age, Taibel)
Väisänen (Paivarinta, Ervasti) – 48:09	2–2
	2–3	60:41 – Biasca (Bischel)

2 min
Penalties
4 min
16
Shots
27

26 December 2022; 17:00	Latvia	2–5 (0–0, 2–2, 0–3)	United States	Avenir Centre, Moncton; Attendance: 4,927

Game reference

Patriks Bērziņš
Goalies
Trey Augustine
Referees:
(Germany) Marc Iwert
(Canada) Mathieu Menniti
Linesmen:
(France) Clement Goncalves
(Canada) Shawn Oliver

	0–1	20:24 – Snuggerud (Cooley)
Ravinskis (Rullers, Ozoliņš) – 24:59	1–1
	1–2	29:17 – Behrens (Savage, Duke)
Feņenko (Rullers) – 34:24	2–2
	2–3	41:57 – Lucius (Behrens, Blake)
	2–4	46:48 – Savage (Duke)
	2–5	53:29 – Hughes (Peart, Stramel)

4 min
Penalties
2 min
17
Shots
46

27 December 2022; 12:00	Finland	5–2 (1–1, 3–0, 1–1)	Slovakia	Avenir Centre, Moncton; Attendance: 4,617

Game reference

Jani Lampinen
Goalies
Patrik Andrisík
Matej Marinov
Referees:
(United States) Peter Schlittenhardt
(Czech Republic) Jakub Šindel
Linesmen:
(United States) Brandon Grillo
(Czech Republic) David Klouček

Paivarinta (Suomi, Ervasti) – 08:54	1–0
	1–1	19:49 – Repčík (Dvorský, Štrbák) (PP)
Kemell (Koivunen, Salin) – 23:34	2–1
O. Kapanen (Kemell) – 27:45	3–1
Nyman (Vilén, O. Kapanen) (PP) – 33:56	4–1
	4–2	43:22 – Repčík (Štrbák, Čiernik) (PP)
Lambert (Ervasti) – 45:01	5–2

6 min
Penalties
2 min
23
Shots
24

27 December 2022; 17:00	Switzerland	3–2 GWS (1–1, 0–1, 1–0) (OT: 0–0) (SO: 2–1)	Latvia	Avenir Centre, Moncton; Attendance: 3,812

Game reference

Kevin Pasche
Goalies
Patriks Bērziņš
Referees:
(Canada) Mathieu Menniti
(Finland) Anssi Salonen
Linesmen:
(Finland) Onni Hautamäki
(Canada) Shawn Oliver

Robin (Zanetti) – 08:20	1–0
	1–1	13:03 – Ločmelis (Ozoliņš)
	1–2	37:50 – Dukurs (Laviņš, Ozoliņš)
Dionicio (Biasca, Bichsel) (EA) – 58:04	2–2

Biasca (miss)
Robin (miss)
Reichle (miss)
Dionicio (miss)
Taibel (miss)
Biasca
Reichle
Shootout
(miss) Ločmelis
(miss) Rullers
(miss) Bukarts
(miss) Dukurs
(miss) Vilmanis
Ločmelis
(miss) Dukurs
18 min
Penalties
6 min
30
Shots
18

28 December 2022; 17:00	Slovakia	6–3 (1–2, 3–0, 2–1)	United States	Avenir Centre, Moncton; Attendance: 6,438

Game reference

Adam Gajan
Goalies
Kaidan Mbereko
Referees:
(Sweden) Richard Magnusson
(Finland) Anssi Salonen
Linesmen:
(France) Clement Goncalves
(United States) Brandon Grillo

L. Nemec (Žlnka, Š. Nemec) – 02:14	1–0
	1–1	04:42 – Boucher (McGroarty, Gauthier) (PP)
	1–2	06:48 – Brindley (Hutson, Stramel)
Dvorský (Štrbák, Repčík) (PP) – 30:01	2–2
Bačo (Groch, Kmec) – 31:48	3–2
Mešár (Š. Nemec, Sotek) – 33:20	4–2
Repčík (Kmec) – 50:46	5–2
	5–3	55:08 – Boucher (Gauthier, Cooley) (PP)
Čiernik (Š. Nemec) (ENG) – 58:53	6–3

33 min
Penalties
29 min
26
Shots
36

29 December 2022; 12:00	Latvia	0–3 (0–1, 0–1, 0–1)	Finland	Avenir Centre, Moncton; Attendance: 4,081

Game reference

Patriks Bērziņš
Goalies
Jani Lampinen
Referees:
(Canada) Graeden Hamilton
(Switzerland) Michael Scherrig
Linesmen:
(France) Clement Goncalves
(Canada) Tarrington Wyonzek

0–1	04:43 – Nyman (Malinen, Salin)
0–2	29:34 – Huuhtanen (Nyman, Salin)
0–3	57:45 – K. Kapanen (Paivarinta) (ENG)

6 min
Penalties
10 min
31
Shots
29

29 December 2022; 17:00	United States	5–1 (1–0, 3–1, 1–0)	Switzerland	Avenir Centre, Moncton; Attendance: 7,024

Game reference

Trey Augustine
Goalies
Alessio Beglieri
Referees:
(Canada) Michael Campbell
(Slovakia) Tomáš Hronský
Linesmen:
(Canada) Spencer Knox
(Germany) Patrick Laguzov

Snuggerud (Cooley, Gauthier) – 18:05	1–0
Cooley (McGroarty, Gauthier) (PP) – 25:49	2–0
Snuggerud (Blake, Ufko) (PP) – 36:40	3–0
Boucher (Chesley, Lipkin) – 38:02	4–0
	4–1	39:32 – Biasca (Canonica)
Hughes (Behrens, Savage) – 53:03	5–1

8 min
Penalties
8 min
42
Shots
19

30 December 2022; 12:00	Slovakia	3–0 (1–0, 0–0, 2–0)	Latvia	Avenir Centre, Moncton; Attendance: 3,878

Game reference

Adam Gajan
Goalies
Patriks Bērziņš
Referees:
(Sweden) Andreas Harnebring
(United States) Riley Yerkovich
Linesmen:
(Sweden) Daniel Persson
(Canada) Tarrington Wyonzek

Čiernik (Repčík, Dvorský) (PP) – 17:52	1–0
Š. Nemec (Mešár, L. Nemec) – 49:03	2–0
Mešár (ENG) - 57:03	3–0

6 min
Penalties
6 min
26
Shots
28

31 December 2022; 12:00	Switzerland	4–3 GWS (0–1, 1–2, 2–0) (OT: 0–0) (SO: 3–2)	Slovakia	Avenir Centre, Moncton; Attendance: 4,849

Game reference

Kevin Pasche
Goalies
Adam Gajan
Referees:
(Canada) Graeden Hamilton
(Germany) Marc Iwert
Linesmen:
(Canada) Spencer Knox
(Germany) Patrick Laguzov

	0–1	04:11 – Sýkora (Bečár, Nátny)
Reichle (Taibel, Streule) – 21:07	1–1
	1–2	37:20 – Petrovský (L. Nemec, Mešár)
	1–3	38:09 – Petrovský (Mešár, L. Nemec)
Ramel (Reichle, Müller) – 42:20	2–3
Canonica (Biasca, Robin) (PP) – 48:40	3–3

Biasca (miss)
Reichle (miss)
Despont (miss)
Ramel (miss)
Müller
Biasca (miss)
Reichle (miss)
Canonica
Canonica (miss)
Dionicio
Shootout
(miss) Petrovský
(miss) Mešár
(miss) Dvorský
Repčík
(miss) Sýkora
(miss) Petrovský
(miss) Mišiak
Mešár
(miss) Repčík
(miss) Dvorský
2 min
Penalties
6 min
36
Shots
32

31 December 2022; 17:00	United States	6–2 (1–1, 3–1, 2–0)	Finland	Avenir Centre, Moncton; Attendance: 8,231

Game reference

Trey Augustine
Goalies
Aku Koskenvuo
Referees:
(Canada) Michael Campbell
(Sweden) Andreas Harnebring
Linesmen:
(Sweden) Daniel Persson
(Canada) Tarrington Wyonzek

Lucius (Ufko, Blake) – 15:22	1–0
	1–1	16:27 – Kemell (Heimosalmi, Hameenaho) (PP)
McGroarty (Hughes, Augustine) (PP) – 24:57	2–1
Snuggerud – 29:02	3–1
Hughes (Cooley, Snuggerud) – 34:48	4–1
	4–2	35:15 – Hameenaho (Huutanen, Heimosalmi)
Cooley (Snuggerud, Gauthier) – 43:55	5–2
Hutson (Snuggerud, Cooley) – 56:15	6–2

10 min
Penalties
6 min
30
Shots
31

=== Relegation ===
2 January 2023; 10:30	Latvia	5–2 (1–2, 1–0, 3–0)	Austria	Scotiabank Centre, Halifax; Attendance: 4,879

Game reference

Patriks Bērziņš
Goalies
Thomas Pfarrmaier
Referees:
(Finland) Anssi Salonen
(United States) Peter Schlittenhardt
Linesmen:
(Finland) Onni Hautamäki
(Canada) Shawn Oliver

	0–1	05:20 – Auer (Scherzer, Sablatting)
Ločmelis (Ozoliņš, Laviņš) (PP) – 16:16	1–1
	1–2	17:53 – Rohrer (Scherzer, Auer)
Veckaktiņš (Simanovičs, Hodass) – 37:01	2–2
Veckaktiņš (Simanovičs) – 48:50	3–2
Vilmanis (Veinbergs, Hodass) (PP) – 51:22	4–2
Hodass (Feņenko) (ENG) – 58:54	5–2

6 min
Penalties
31 min
46
Shots
13

4 January 2023; 11:00	Austria	2–4 (0–1, 0–2, 2–1)	Latvia	Scotiabank Centre, Halifax; Attendance: 3,456

Game reference

Thomas Pfarrmaier
Goalies
Patriks Bērziņš
Referees:
(Sweden) Andreas Harnebring
(Canada) Mathieu Menniti
Linesmen:
(France) Clément Goncalves
(Sweden) Daniel Persson

	0–1	06:40 – Hodass (Bukarts, Purmalis)
	0–2	36:12 – Silkalns (Simanovičs)
	0–3	37:51 – Ločmelis (Ravinskis)
	0–4	44:33 – Vilmanis (Laviņš, Bogdans)
Auer (Rohrer, Reinbacher) (EA) – 55:16	1–4
van Ee (Scherzer, Reinbacher) (EA) – 57:25	2–4

2 min
Penalties
2 min
34
Shots
19

Note: Austria was relegated to the 2024 Division I A.

=== Playoff round ===
Teams that won their quarterfinal match were reseeded for the semi-finals in accordance with the following ranking system:

1. Higher position in their respective group
2. Greater number of points
3. Better goal differential (GD)
4. Greater number of goals scored (GF)
5. Higher seeding coming into the tournament (As determined by their final placement at the 2022 World Junior Ice Hockey Championships).

Rank	Team	Group	Pos	Pts	GD	GF	Seed
1	Czechia	A	1	10	+18	24	4
2	United States	B	1	9	+8	19	5
3	Canada	A	2	9	+21	29	1
4	Finland	B	2	7	+1	12	2
5	Sweden	A	3	8	+9	16	3
6	Slovakia	B	3	7	+2	14	9
7	Switzerland	B	4	6	–1	11	8
8	Germany	A	4	3	–15	7	6

==== Bracket ====
Quarterfinals
2 January – Scotiabank Centre
1A Czechia	9
4B Switzerland	1
2 January – Avenir Centre
2B Finland	2
3A Sweden	3
2 January – Avenir Centre
1B United States	11
4A Germany	1
2 January – Scotiabank Centre
2A Canada (OT)	4
3B Slovakia	3

Semifinals
4 January – Scotiabank Centre
1 Czechia (OT)	2
5 Sweden	1
4 January – Scotiabank Centre
2 United States	2
3 Canada	6

Final
5 January – Scotiabank Centre
1 Czechia	2
3 Canada (OT)	3
Third place
5 January – Scotiabank Centre
2 United States (OT)	8
5 Sweden	7

==== Quarterfinals ====
Oliver Kapanen scored early against Sweden to give the lead to Finland, with Leo Carlsson levelling the scores by the second period. Despite Niko Huuhtanen once again putting the Finns ahead, Carlsson and Victor Stjernborg both scored for the Swedes to complete the comeback and win the match 3–2. Top seed Czechia defeated Switzerland 9–1, scoring 4 goals in the second period. They advanced to their second consecutive semi-finals, after 2022. The United States put 11 past Nikita Quapp and Rihards Babulis in a convincing 11–1 victory, with Logan Cooley earning a hat-trick. A back-and-forth match between Canada and Slovakia saw both teams with 3 goals by the end of regulation, sending the match to overtime. Connor Bedard scored the winner in the 65th minute after weaving his way past multiple Slovak defenders. This marked his 3rd point of the match and his 21st of the tournament, maintaining his World Juniors record.

2 January 2023; 12:00	Finland	2–3 (1–1, 0–0, 1–2)	Sweden	Avenir Centre, Moncton; Attendance: 7,263

Game reference

Jani Lampinen
Goalies
Carl Lindbom
Referees:
(Canada) Graeden Hamilton
(Switzerland) Michael Tscherrig
Linesmen:
(United States) Brandon Grillo
(Canada) Tarrington Wynozek

O. Kapanen (Kemell, Koivunen) – 03:10	1–0
	1–1	16:55 – Carlsson (Jansson, Bystedt)
Huuhtanen (Miettinen) – 44:03	2–1
	2–2	56:33 – Carlsson (Bystedt, Wagner)
	2–3	58:55 – Stjernborg (SH)

6 min
Penalties
6 min
35
Shots
20

2 January 2023; 14:30	Czechia	9–1 (3–1, 4–0, 2–0)	Switzerland	Scotiabank Centre, Halifax; Attendance: 8,746

Game reference

Tomáš Suchánek
Goalies
Kevin Pasche
Alessio Beglieri
Referees:
(Canada) Michael Campbell
(Canada) Mathieu Meniniti
Linesmen:
(Germany) Patrick Laguzov
(Sweden) Daniel Persson

	0–1	00:22 – Robin
Kulich (Svozil, Suchánek) – 02:41	1–1
Marcel (SH) – 07:09	2–1
Hauser (Marcel, Kos) – 09:37	3–1
Jiříček (Kulich) – 20:28	4–1
Kulich (Šalé, Brabenec) – 25:42	5–1
Szturc (Svozil, Brabenec) – 33:10	6–1
Šalé (Kulich) – 38:54	7–1
Marcel (Čech, Ticháček) – 43:18	8–1
Szturc (Ticháček, Jiříček) – 44:22	9–1

10 min
Penalties
4 min
28
Shots
18

2 January 2023; 17:00	United States	11–1 (3–0, 5–0, 3–1)	Germany	Avenir Centre, Moncton; Attendance: 7,262

Game reference

Trey Augustine
Andrew Oke
Goalies
Nikita Quapp
Rihards Babulis
Referees:
(Sweden) Andreas Harnebring
(Slovakia) Tomas Hronský
Linesmen:
(Canada) Spencer Knox
(Slovakia) Daniel Konc

Cooley (Ufko, Snuggerud) – 03:51	1–0
Snuggerud (Ufko, Lucius) (PP) – 08:00	2–0
Savage (Ufko, Peart) – 08:39	3–0
Blake (Lucius, McGroarty) – 29:05	4–0
Cooley (Ufko, Peart) – 31:03	5–0
Gauthier (Mittlestadt) – 31:21	6–0
Savage (Brindley, Mittlestadt) (SH) – 35:25	7–0
Gauthier (Snuggerud, Cooley) – 37:24	8–0
Connors (Duke, Hutson) – 44:36	9–0
Cooley (Gauthier, Mittlestadt) – 46:53	10–0
Duke (Ufko, Boucher) – 48:31	11–0
	11–1	56:48 – Hauf (SH)

4 min
Penalties
6 min
41
Shots
22

2 January 2023; 19:30	Canada	4–3 OT (1–0, 2–2, 0–1) (OT: 1–0)	Slovakia	Scotiabank Centre, Halifax; Attendance: 10,349

Game reference

Thomas Milic
Goalies
Adam Gajan
Referees:
(Germany) Marc Iwert
(Czech Republic) Jakub Šindel
Linesmen:
(Czech Republic) David Klouček
(United States) John Waleski

Bedard (Stankoven) – 06:07	1–0
Guenther (Othmann, Bedard) (PP) – 25:02	2–0
	2–1	26:58 – L. Nemec (S. Nemec, Petrovský) (PP)
Ostapchuk (Dean, Gaucher) – 29:00	3–1
	3–2	33:18 – Bačo (Repčík, Nátny)
	3–3	51:25 – L. Nemec (Mešár, Groch)
Bedard – 65:17	4–3

6 min
Penalties
12 min
57
Shots
27

==== Semifinals ====
In their second meeting in the tournament, Czechia advanced to their first final since 2001 after defeating Sweden 2–1. Ludvig Jansson scored first for Sweden, but David Jiříček equalized with less than a minute of regulation time. In the last minute of overtime, just as the match was about to go to a shootout, Jiří Kulich scored to send Czechia to the final. Canada made a statement against rivals United States by beating them 6–2, sending Canada to their 4th consecutive World Juniors final. Despite United States leading 2–0 after 10 minutes, Canada soon found their form and scored 6 past the Americans.

4 January 2023; 15:30	Czechia	2–1 OT (0–0, 0–1, 1–0) (OT: 1–0)	Sweden	Scotiabank Centre, Halifax; Attendance: 9,265

Game reference

Tomáš Suchánek
Goalies
Carl Lindbom
Referees:
(Canada) Michael Campbell
(Canada) Graeden Hamilton
Linesmen:
(United States) Brandon Grillo
(Canada) Tarrington Wynozek

	0–1	21:39 – Jansson (E. Pettersson, Östlund)
Jiříček (Špaček, Szturc) (EA) – 59:21	1–1
Kulich (Šapovaliv, Špaček) – 69:10	2–1

8 min
Penalties
4 min
31
Shots
22

4 January 2023; 19:30	United States	2–6 (2–1, 0–3, 0–2)	Canada	Scotiabank Centre, Halifax; Attendance: 10,636

Game reference

Trey Augustine
Kaidan Mbereko
Goalies
Thomas Milic
Referees:
(Finland) Anssi Salonen
(Switzerland) Michaël Tscherrig
Linesmen:
(Finland) Onni Hautamäki
(Germany) Patrick Laguzov

Cooley (Ufko, Snuggerud) – 01:19	1–0
Connors (Stramel, Brindley) – 10:30	2–0
	2–1	11:49 – Bedard (Del Mastro, Roy)
	2–2	20:47 – Stankoven (Roy, Clarke)
	2–3	25:46 – Fantilli (Dean, Zellweger)
	2–4	32:20 – Roy (Stankoven, Bedard)
	2–5	49:45 – Clarke (Fantilli, Beck)
	2–6	56:45 – Roy (SH,ENG)

6 min
Penalties
10 min
45
Shots
37

==== Bronze medal game ====
The United States defeated Sweden in an 8–7 thriller, the most goals in a single World Juniors match since an 18-goal match between Canada and Germany in 2021. Chaz Lucius scored a hat-trick after a deflection off Swedish goaltender Carl Lindbom found its way to Lucius, who slotted it in the side netting to score the winning goal in overtime.

5 January 2023; 15:30	United States	8–7 OT (1–0, 4–5, 2–2) (OT: 1–0)	Sweden	Scotiabank Centre, Halifax; Attendance: 9,031

Game reference

Trey Augustine
Kaidan Mbereko
Goalies
Carl Lindbom
Referees:
(Canada) Michael Campbell
(Canada) Graeden Hamilton
Linesmen:
(Finland) Onni Hautamäki
(Sweden) Daniel Persson

Cooley (Snuggerud) – 02:51	1–0
Ufko (Snuggerud, Blake) (PP) – 21:51	2–0
	2–1	23:33 – Bystedt (Lekkerimäki, Rosén)
Lucius (Blake) – 25:04	3–1
	3–2	26:35 – O. Pettersson (Sandin-Pellikka)
	3–3	28:52 – Carlsson (Wagner, Bystedt)
Gauthier (Cooley, McGroarty) (PP) – 30:42	4–3
Lucius (Ufko) – 33:37	5–3
	5–4	38:52 – Oscarson (Carlsson, Jansson) (PP)
	5–5	39:18 – Öhgren
	5–6	44:00 – Östlund (E. Pettersson, Strömgren)
Hughes (McGroarty) – 48:17	6–6
Gauthier (McGroarty, Brindley) (PP) – 58:23	7–6
	7–7	59:38 – Bystedt (Rosén, Jansson) (EA)
Lucius (Hutson, Savage) – 62:06	8–7

6 min
Penalties
33 min
36
Shots
36

==== Gold medal game ====
Canada lead 1–0 in the first period and managed a 2–0 lead in the second. Czechia would tie the game in the third period, sending the match into overtime. Dylan Guenther would score the overtime winner to earn the 20th gold medal for Canada.

5 January 2023; 19:30	Czechia	2–3 OT (0–1, 0–1, 2–0) (OT: 0–1)	Canada	Scotiabank Centre, Halifax; Attendance: 10,735

Game reference

Tomáš Suchánek
Goalies
Thomas Milic
Referees:
(Sweden) Andreas Harnebring
(Finland) Anssi Salonen
Linesmen:
(United States) Brandon Grillo
(Canada) Tarrington Wyonzek

	0–1	12:41 – Guenther (Clarke, Othmann) (PP)
	0–2	24:35 – Wright (Guenther, Othmann)
Kulich (Šalé, Šapovaliv) – 52:30	1–2
Kos (Hamara) – 53:24	2–2
	2–3	66:22 – Guenther (Roy, Clarke)

4 min
Penalties
6 min
26
Shots
38

=== Statistics ===
==== Scoring leaders ====
Pos	Player	Country	GP	G	A	Pts	+/−	PIM
1	Connor Bedard	Canada	7	9	14	23	+14	2
2	Logan Cooley	United States	7	7	7	14	+3	2
3	Jimmy Snuggerud	United States	7	5	8	13	+5	2
4	Joshua Roy	Canada	7	5	6	11	+14	0
5	Logan Stankoven	Canada	7	3	8	11	+12	0
6	Dylan Guenther	Canada	7	7	3	10	–1	4
7	Filip Bystedt	Sweden	7	4	6	10	+8	4
7	Cutter Gauthier	United States	7	4	6	10	+4	2
7	Ludvig Jansson	Sweden	7	4	6	10	+9	4
10	Ryan Ufko	United States	7	1	9	10	+3	2

GP = Games played; G = Goals; A = Assists; Pts = Points; +/− = Plus–minus; PIM = Penalties In Minutes
Source: IIHF.com

==== Goaltending leaders ====
(minimum 40% team's total ice time)

Pos	Player	Country	TOI	GA	GAA	SA	Sv%	SO
1	Adam Gajan	Slovakia	250:15	10	2.40	156	93.59	1
2	Tomáš Suchánek	Czechia	435:13	11	1.52	167	93.41	1
3	Jani Lampinen	Finland	179:00	5	1.68	75	93.33	1
4	Thomas Milic	Canada	340:01	10	1.76	147	93.20	0
5	Carl Lindbom	Sweden	439:42	19	2.59	222	91.44	2

TOI = Time on ice (minutes:seconds); GA = Goals against; GAA = Goals against average; SA = Shots against; Sv% = Save percentage; SO = Shutouts
Source: IIHF.com

=== Awards ===
- Best players selected by the directorate:
  - Best Goaltender: (Slovakia) Adam Gajan
  - Best Defenceman: (Czech Republic) David Jiříček
  - Best Forward: (Canada) Connor Bedard

Source: IIHF

- Media All-Stars:
  - MVP: (Canada) Connor Bedard
  - Goaltender: (Czech Republic) Tomáš Suchánek
  - Defencemen: (Czech Republic) David Jiříček / (Sweden) Ludvig Jansson
  - Forwards: (United States) Logan Cooley / (Czech Republic) Jiří Kulich / (Canada) Connor Bedard

Source: IIHF

=== Final standings ===
Pos	Grp	Team	Pld	W	OTW	OTL	L	GF	GA	GD	Pts	Final result
1	A	Canada (H)	7	4	2	0	1	42	15	+27	16	Champions
2	A	Czechia	7	4	1	2	0	37	11	+26	16	Runners-up
3	B	United States	7	4	1	0	2	40	25	+15	14	Third place
4	A	Sweden	7	3	1	2	1	27	19	+8	13	Fourth place
5	B	Finland	5	2	0	1	2	14	14	0	7	Eliminated in quarter-finals
6	B	Slovakia	5	2	0	2	1	17	16	+1	8	Eliminated in quarter-finals
7	B	Switzerland	5	0	3	0	2	12	21	−9	6	Eliminated in quarter-finals
8	A	Germany	5	1	0	0	4	8	33	−25	3	Eliminated in quarter-finals
9	B	Latvia	6	2	0	1	3	13	18	−5	7	Avoided relegation
10	A	Austria	6	0	0	0	6	6	44	−38	0	Relegated to the 2024 Division I A

Source: IIHF
(H) Host

== Division I ==
=== Group A ===
The Division I Group A tournament was played in Asker, Norway, from December 11 to 17, 2022.

Pos	Team	Pld	W	OTW	OTL	L	GF	GA	GD	Pts	Promotion or relegation
1	Norway (H)	5	5	0	0	0	19	8	+11	15	Promoted to the 2024 Top Division
2	Kazakhstan	5	3	0	0	2	14	11	+3	9	
3	France	5	2	0	1	2	16	14	+2	7	
4	Hungary	5	1	1	1	2	18	18	0	6	
5	Denmark	5	1	1	0	3	9	19	−10	5	
6	Slovenia	5	1	0	0	4	15	21	−6	3	Relegated to the 2024 Division I B

Source: IIHF
Rules for classification: 1) points; 2) head-to-head points; 3) head-to-head goal difference; 4) head-to-head number of goals scored; 5) result against closest best-ranked team outside tied teams; 6) result against second-best-ranked team outside tied teams; 7) seeding before tournament.
(H) Host

=== Group B ===
The Division I Group B tournament was played in Bytom, Poland, from December 11 to 17, 2022.

Pos	Team	Pld	W	OTW	OTL	L	GF	GA	GD	Pts	Promotion or relegation
1	Japan	5	4	0	1	0	25	16	+9	13	Promoted to the 2024 Division I A
2	Ukraine	5	4	0	0	1	23	12	+11	12	
3	Italy	5	2	1	0	2	12	13	−1	8	
4	Poland (H)	5	1	1	0	3	21	19	+2	5	
5	Estonia	5	1	0	1	3	11	14	−3	4	
6	South Korea	5	1	0	0	4	12	30	−18	3	Relegated to the 2024 Division II A

Source: IIHF
Rules for classification: 1) points; 2) head-to-head points; 3) head-to-head goal difference; 4) head-to-head number of goals scored; 5) result against closest best-ranked team outside tied teams; 6) result against second-best-ranked team outside tied teams; 7) seeding before tournament.
(H) Host

== Division II ==
=== Group A ===
The Division II Group A tournament was played in Kaunas, Lithuania, from December 11 to 17, 2022.

Pos	Team	Pld	W	OTW	OTL	L	GF	GA	GD	Pts	Promotion or relegation
1	Croatia	5	3	1	1	0	25	17	+8	12 (Note: Great Britain 4–7 Croatia)	Promoted to the 2024 Division I B
2	Great Britain	5	4	0	0	1	27	11	+16	12	
3	Lithuania (H)	5	3	0	1	1	15	9	+6	10	
4	Spain	5	2	0	0	3	18	20	−2	6	
5	Netherlands	5	1	1	0	3	11	21	−10	5	
6	Romania	5	0	0	0	5	11	29	−18	0	Relegated to the 2024 Division II B

Source: IIHF
Rules for classification: 1) points; 2) head-to-head points; 3) head-to-head goal difference; 4) head-to-head number of goals scored; 5) result against closest best-ranked team outside tied teams; 6) result against second-best-ranked team outside tied teams; 7) seeding before tournament.
(H) Host

=== Group B ===
The Division II Group B tournament was played in Reykjavík, Iceland, from January 16 to 22, 2023.

Pos	Team	Pld	W	OTW	OTL	L	GF	GA	GD	Pts	Promotion or relegation
1	China	5	4	1	0	0	29	9	+20	14	Promoted to the 2024 Division II A
2	Belgium	5	4	0	1	0	25	14	+11	13	
3	Serbia	5	3	0	0	2	27	18	+9	9	
4	Iceland (H)	5	2	0	0	3	18	21	−3	6	
5	Chinese Taipei	5	1	0	0	4	17	29	−12	3	
6	Mexico	5	0	0	0	5	7	32	−25	0	Relegated to the 2024 Division III

Source: IIHF
Rules for classification: 1) points; 2) head-to-head points; 3) head-to-head goal difference; 4) head-to-head number of goals scored; 5) result against closest best-ranked team outside tied teams; 6) result against second-best-ranked team outside tied teams; 7) seeding before tournament.
(H) Host

== Division III ==
The Division III tournament was played in Istanbul, Turkey, from January 26 to February 2, 2023. After the Preliminary round, all teams advanced to the Quarterfinals.

=== Playoffs ===
Quarterfinals
30 January
A1 Australia	28
B4 South Africa	0
30 January
B1 Israel	10
A4 Bosnia and Herzegovina	0
30 January
A2 Kyrgyzstan	1
B3 Turkey	3
30 January
B2 Bulgaria	6
A3 New Zealand	2

Semifinals
1 February
1 Israel	6
5 Turkey	4
1 February
2 Australia	4
3 Bulgaria	1

Final
2 February
1 Israel	1
2 Australia	4
3rd place match
2 February
3 Bulgaria	8
5 Turkey	3

7th place match
1 February
7	Bosnia and Herzegovina	7
8	South Africa	3

5th place match
2 February
4	Kyrgyzstan	2
6	New Zealand	3

=== Final standings ===
Position	Team	Promotion / Relegation
1	Australia	Promoted to the 2024 Division II B
2	Israel	
3	Bulgaria	
4	Turkey	
5	New Zealand	
6	Kyrgyzstan	
7	Bosnia and Herzegovina	Relegated to the 2024 Division III B
8	South Africa	Relegated to the 2024 Division III B
