= Brandt Clarke =

Canadian ice hockey player (born 2003)

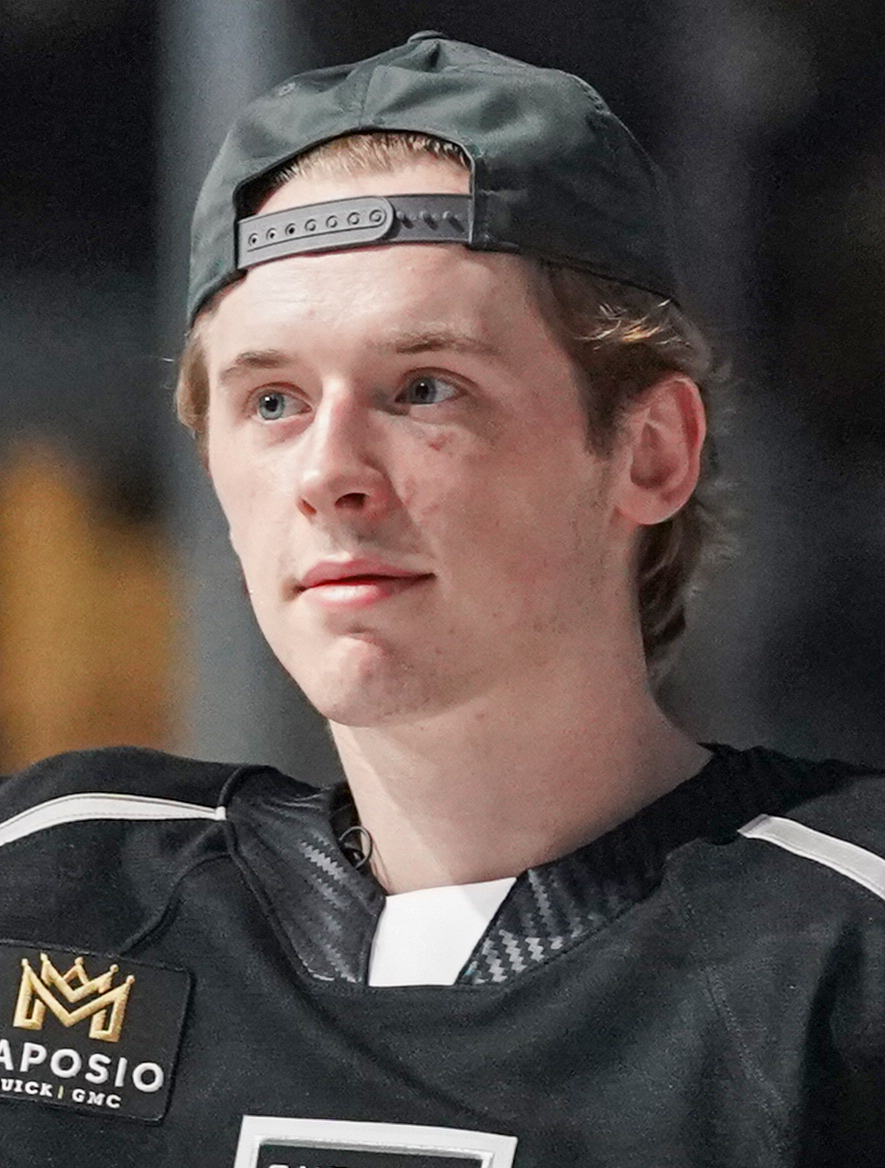
- Clarke with the Ontario Reign in 2024
- Born: February 9, 2003 (age 23) Ottawa, Ontario, Canada
- Height: 6 ft 2 in (188 cm)
- Weight: 195 lb (88 kg; 13 st 13 lb)
- Position: Defence
- Shoots: Right
- NHL team Former teams: Los Angeles Kings; HC Nové Zámky
- NHL draft: 8th overall, 2021; Los Angeles Kings
- Playing career: 2020–present

Brandt Clarke (born February 9, 2003) is a Canadian professional ice hockey player who is a defenceman for the Los Angeles Kings of the National Hockey League (NHL). He was drafted eighth overall by the Los Angeles Kings in the 2021 NHL entry draft.

== Playing career ==
On April 6, 2019 and marking the end of his high-profile minor hockey career, Clarke was drafted in the first round, fourth overall in the 2019 OHL Priority Selection to play major junior hockey with the Barrie Colts. Playing as a rookie for the Barrie Colts in what turned out to be the COVID-19-shortened 2019–20 season, Clarke led all rookie OHL defensemen, scoring six goals and 32 assists and he was considered a lock to go in the first round of the 2021 NHL Entry Draft. At the conclusion of the 2019–20 season, Clarke was named to the OHL First All-Rookie Team, as selected by the OHL's General Managers.

In the following season (2020–21) when the entire OHL regular season was cancelled due to COVID-19, Clarke was able to continue his development in Slovakia, playing with his brother Graeme on loan to HC Nové Zámky of the Tipsport Liga, scoring five goals with ten assists while playing a partial season of only 26 games.

On July 23, 2021, Clarke was selected in the first-round, eighth overall, by the Los Angeles Kings in the 2021 NHL entry draft. Clarke was soon signed to a three-year, entry-level contract with the Kings on August 10, 2021. In November 2021, as the OHL resumed play, Clarke was named captain of the Colts for the 2021–22 OHL season, becoming the 22nd captain in Colts history.

In the 2022–23 NHL season, Clarke made his NHL regular-season debut for the Los Angeles Kings in a home game against the Seattle Kraken on October 13, 2022. Clarke collected his first career NHL point, an assist, during a road game against the Pittsburgh Penguins on October 20, 2022, making Clarke the seventh youngest defenceman and 18th youngest player in Kings history to record a point. When in Los Angeles, Clarke – then the NHL's second-youngest defenseman during the 2022–23 season – billeted at the home of Jonathan Quick, the Kings' goaltender and oldest player at that time. During the 2022–23 season, Clarke played 21 competitive games, split between the Kings (9 NHL games), Ontario Reign (5 AHL games) and Team Canada (7 IIHF World Junior Championship games), on top of 12 exhibition games at a variety of elite levels, before being reassigned on January 6, 2023 by the Los Angeles Kings to the Barrie Colts for the remainder of the 2022–23 OHL season. Clarke earned 61 points in just 31 regular-season games with the Barrie Colts and he tied the franchise record for regular-season goals in a single season by a defenceman (23 goals) while also becoming the franchise's all-time regular-season scoring leader amongst defencemen (158 points). He was subsequently named to both the OHL and CHL's First All-Star Teams.

Clarke played with the Ontario Reign for the bulk of the 2023–24 season. He and his brother Graeme were both selected for the 2024 AHL All-Star Game, the second pair of brothers to attend the game together after Peter and Chris Ferraro in 1997 and 2003. He finished the regular season with 10 goals and 36 assists in 50 games, and was named to both the All-Rookie and Second All-Star Teams.

On February 17, 2024, Clarke scored his first NHL goal, an overtime goal, to give the Kings a 5–4 victory over the Boston Bruins. He appeared in sixteen games with the Kings during the 2023–24 season, registering two goals and four assists.

== International play ==
Medal record

Representing Canada

Ice hockey

World Junior Championships
Gold medal – first place	2023 Canada	

World U18 Championships
Gold medal – first place	2021 United States	

Clarke won Gold playing for Team Canada in the 2021 IIHF World U18 Championships, averaging a point-per-game. The tournament was held in Frisco, Texas, USA from April 26, 2021 to May 6, 2021. Clarke was named to the tournament All-Star team, as selected by the media.

Clarke was selected to participate in Hockey Canada's National Junior Team Summer Camp (held in Calgary, Alberta from July 23-27, 2022) for the 2023 National Junior Team that participated in the 2023 World Junior Ice Hockey Championships that was held in Halifax, Nova Scotia and Moncton, New Brunswick, Canada from December 26, 2022 to January 5, 2023. On December 7, 2022, it was announced that the L.A. Kings loaned Clarke to Canada’s world junior hockey team ahead of its Selection Camp for the 2023 World Junior Ice Hockey Championships.

On December 12, 2022, Clarke was named to Team Canada to compete at the 2023 World Junior Ice Hockey Championships. During the tournament, Clarke scored two goals and recorded six assists in seven games, including an assist on the final game-winning goal in overtime. Team Canada won the gold medal in overtime against Czechia on January 5, 2023.

== Playing style ==
Clarke has been described as a defensive player, particularly with regards to stick control and tactical positioning. He has been considered a new-era defenseman best known for his offensive capabilities and his eagerness and creativity while breaking out of the defensive zone and participating actively in the offensive zone.

== Personal life ==
Clarke was born into an athletic family, as both his siblings and father have played ice hockey. His father Chris played junior hockey in Southern Ontario, his sister Mackenzie plays for St. Lawrence University, and his older brother Graeme plays for the Belleville Senators, the AHL affiliate of the Ottawa Senators.

== Career statistics ==
=== Regular season and playoffs ===
			Regular season					Playoffs
Season	Team	League	GP	G	A	Pts	PIM	GP	G	A	Pts	PIM
2018–19	Don Mills Flyers	GTHL	33	19	35	54	22	—	—	—	—	—
2019–20	Barrie Colts	OHL	57	6	32	38	38	—	—	—	—	—
2020–21	HC Nové Zámky	Slovak	26	5	10	15	41	—	—	—	—	—
2021–22	Barrie Colts	OHL	55	11	48	59	29	—	—	—	—	—
2022–23	Los Angeles Kings	NHL	9	0	2	2	6	—	—	—	—	—
2022–23	Ontario Reign	AHL	5	1	1	2	2	—	—	—	—	—
2022–23	Barrie Colts	OHL	31	23	38	61	28	12	7	16	23	13
2023–24	Ontario Reign	AHL	50	10	36	46	49	8	0	6	6	20
2023–24	Los Angeles Kings	NHL	16	2	4	6	10	—	—	—	—	—
2024–25	Los Angeles Kings	NHL	78	5	28	33	46	6	2	0	2	0
2025–26	Los Angeles Kings	NHL	82	8	32	40	63	4	0	1	1	0
NHL totals			185	15	66	81	125	10	2	1	3	0

=== International ===
Year	Team	Event	Result	GP	G	A	Pts	PIM
2019	Canada Black	U17	8th	5	1	5	6	2
2021	Canada	U18	1st place, gold medalist(s)	7	2	5	7	0
2023	Canada	WJC	1st place, gold medalist(s)	7	2	6	8	6
Junior totals				19	5	16	21	8

== Awards and honours ==
Award	Year	Ref
CHL
First All-Star Team	2023	
OHL
First All-Rookie Team	2020	
Second All-Star Team	2022	
First All-Star Team	2023	
International
U18 All-Star Team	2021	
AHL
AHL All-Star Game	2024	
All-Rookie Team	2024	
Second All-Star Team	2024	

Awards and achievements
Preceded by Quinton Byfield	Los Angeles Kings first-round draft pick 2021	Succeeded by Liam Greentree
