= Dans Ločmelis =

Latvian ice hockey player (born 2004)

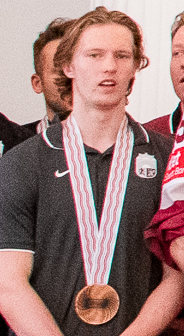
- Ločmelis in 2023
- Born: January 21, 2004 (age 22) Jelgava, Latvia
- Height: 6 ft 1 in (185 cm)
- Weight: 179 lb (81 kg; 12 st 11 lb)
- Position: Centre
- Shoots: Left
- NHL team (P) Cur. team Former teams: Boston Bruins; Providence Bruins (AHL); HK Mogo; Luleå HF
- National team: Latvia
- NHL draft: 119th overall, 2022; Boston Bruins
- Playing career: 2025–present

Dans Ločmelis (born January 21, 2004) is a Latvian professional ice hockey player who is a centre for the Providence Bruins of the American Hockey League (AHL) while under contract to the Boston Bruins of the National Hockey League (NHL). He played college ice hockey at UMass Amherst.

== Playing career ==
=== Collegiate ===
After playing multiple years in Sweden playing for Luleå HF, in 2022 it was rumored that Ločmelis was going to leave in order to play college hockey, in desire of more playing time. Although originally rumored to commit to Northern Michigan University, he later committed to play for UMass Amherst starting in the 2023–24 season.

Due to the fact that he played two games for Luleå in the Swedish Hockey League, Ločmelis had to sit out the first four games of the season, as it was an NCAA violation. Because of this late start, Ločmelis struggled to adjust to the new type of play. He finished the season with seven goals and seven assists in 30 games. UMass earned an at-large bid to the 2024 NCAA tournament, where they lost to Denver 2–1 in double overtime.

After an underwhelming freshman season, Ločmelis greatly improved in his sophomore year. He played in all 40 games for the Minutemen, scoring eight goals and 25 assists, which ranked fifth on the team in assists and tied for fourth in total points. Once again, UMass earned an at-large bid to the 2025 NCAA tournament, where they defeated Minnesota 5–4 in overtime to advance to the second round. Ločmelis had two assists in the win, including one on the game winner. The Minutemen faced Western Michigan in the second round, where they lost 2–1, with Ločmelis scoring the lone goal in the loss.

=== Professional ===
At the end of the 2024–25 season, Ločmelis still had two seasons of college eligibility remaining. However, he opted to go pro, and on April 1, 2025, he signed a three-year, entry-level contract with the Boston Bruins, who drafted him 119th overall in the 2022 NHL entry draft. He was assigned to the Bruins' American Hockey League (AHL) affiliate, the Providence Bruins, for the remainder of the 2024–25 season on an amateur try-out (ATO). Ločmelis thrived in his end of season stint with the Bruins. In only his third game, he had a four-point outing, scoring a goal and three assists. He wouldn't score less than two points a game for the rest of the season, and finished the regular season with three goals and nine assists in six games. Ločmelis would register a lone assist in four games in the Calder Cup playoffs for the Bruins before leaving the team to join Latvia in the 2025 IIHF World Championship.

Ločmelis entered the 2025–26 season with many eyes on him after his head-turning performance the year prior. Although he didn't produce at the clip he had in the six games the season prior, Ločmelis was still a key offensive producer for the Providence Bruins, scoring 15 goals and 13 assists for the team at the time of the Olympic break in the AHL in early February, where Ločmelis would go represent Latvia at the 2026 Winter Olympics. However, upon returning from the break, Ločmelis was not found in Providence's lineup, and it was revealed on March 3, 2026, that Ločmelis had undergone shoulder surgery for an injury that he had been dealing with for a while, and would miss the rest of the season.

== International play ==
Ločmelis represents Latvia on the international stage, and has done so on multiple occasions on both the junior and senior level.

Medal record

Representing Latvia

Ice hockey

World Championships
Bronze medal – third place	2023 Finland/Latvia	

Ločmelis played for Latvia in both the 2023 IIHF World Championship and the 2024 IIHF World Championship, helping the team win their first ever medal, a bronze, on home ice in 2023. Ločmelis also played for Latvia in the 2024 Olympic Qualifiers, where he scored a goal and an assist in three games to help clinch a spot in the 2026 Winter Olympics.

Ločmelis also captained the Latvian junior team in the 2024 World Junior Ice Hockey Championships. During the quarterfinals, Ločmelis delivered a hit on United States player Ryan Leonard, which led to him being given a two-game suspension by the International Ice Hockey Federation. Latvia lost the game 7–2, eliminating them from the tournament, and Ločmelis served the suspension in the first two games of the 2024 World Championship.

On April 30, 2025, in the midst of a playoff run with the Providence Bruins, it was reported that after Game 2 of the second round, Ločmelis would leave the team to join Latvia once again in the 2025 IIHF World Championship. Although Latvia would not qualify for the playoff round of the tournament, Ločmelis continued scoring, posting four goals and two assists in seven games. His play got praise from hockey legend and Team Canada captain Sidney Crosby after their game against each other.

Ločmelis would play in his first Olympic Games in 2026. He would score two goals in four games before Latvia was eliminated in the first round of the playoff round.

== Personal life ==
Ločmelis' brother, Ingus, currently plays for HK Mogo of the Latvian Hockey Higher League.

== Career statistics ==
=== Regular season and playoffs ===
			Regular season					Playoffs
Season	Team	League	GP	G	A	Pts	PIM	GP	G	A	Pts	PIM
2019–20	Luleå HF	J18	3	1	0	1	0	—	—	—	—	—
2019–20	Luleå HF	J18 Allsv	3	0	1	1	0	—	—	—	—	—
2020–21	Luleå HF	J18	3	1	1	2	0	—	—	—	—	—
2020–21	Luleå HF	J20	9	3	0	3	0	—	—	—	—	—
2020–21	HK Mogo	LHL	9	0	3	3	2	6	1	0	1	2
2021–22	Luleå HF	J18	3	3	3	6	14	1	0	1	1	0
2021–22	Luleå HF	J20	44	18	16	34	16	5	1	1	2	0
2021–22	Luleå HF	SHL	2	0	0	0	0	—	—	—	—	—
2022–23	Luleå HF	J20	44	25	34	59	22	6	4	3	7	2
2023–24	UMass Amherst	HE	30	7	7	14	4	—	—	—	—	—
2024–25	UMass Amherst	HE	40	8	25	33	8	—	—	—	—	—
2024–25	Providence Bruins	AHL	6	3	9	12	2	4	0	1	1	0
2025–26	Providence Bruins	AHL	43	15	13	28	6	—	—	—	—	—
AHL totals			49	18	22	40	8	4	0	1	1	0

=== International ===
Year	Team	Event	GP	G	A	Pts	PIM
2021	Latvia	U18	4	1	0	1	4
2022	Latvia	U18	4	1	2	3	0
2022	Latvia	WJC	5	1	1	2	4
2023	Latvia	WJC	6	3	0	3	0
2023	Latvia	WC	9	2	1	3	0
2024	Latvia	WJC	5	2	3	5	4
2024	Latvia	WC	5	0	0	0	0
2024	Latvia	OGQ	3	1	1	2	2
2025	Latvia	WC	7	4	2	6	2
2026	Latvia	OG	4	2	0	2	0
Junior totals			24	8	6	14	12
Senior totals			28	9	4	13	4

== Awards and honors ==
Award	Year	Ref
International
World Junior Championship Top 3 Player on Team	2023, 2024	
World Championship Top 3 Player on Team	2025	
