= Jaroslav Chmelař =

Czech ice hockey player (born 2003)

- Born: 20 July 2003 (age 23) Nové Město nad Metují, Czech Republic
- Height: 6 ft 5 in (196 cm)
- Weight: 238 lb (108 kg; 17 st 0 lb)
- Position: Winger
- Shoots: Right
- NHL team: New York Rangers
- National team: Czech Republic
- NHL draft: 144th overall, 2021; New York Rangers
- Playing career: 2024–present

Jaroslav Chmelař (born 20 July 2003) is a Czech professional ice hockey player who is a winger for the New York Rangers of the National Hockey League (NHL). He was drafted by the Rangers in the fifth round of the 2021 NHL entry draft with the 144th overall selection.

== Playing career ==
After playing for junior teams in the Czech Republic, Chmelař came to the United States for the 2022–23 season to attend Providence College and play for the Providence Friars, where he was a teammate of fellow Rangers prospect Brett Berard. At the end of Providence's 2023–24 season he joined the Rangers' American Hockey League (AHL) affiliate, the Hartford Wolf Pack, playing in seven games and scoring two goals. Chmelař spent the entire 2024–25 season with Hartford, recording 12 goals and 17 assists in 71 games. He started the 2025–26 season with Hartford and was called up to the Rangers in November 2025 after recording two goals and three assists in nine games for Hartford. Rangers coach Mike Sullivan said of Chmelař upon his joining the Rangers that:

The conversations I had with Chris Drury and Ryan Martin told me that he's been the best forward. He’s played extremely well, and he’s deserving of getting the call-up, and that’s why he’s here. I think it's a great message for everybody; Performance matters. It matters, it matters in practice, it matters in the games. Whether you're in New York or you're in Hartford, performance matters.

Of the possibility of making his NHL debut, Chmelař said "I can't describe the feeling, it would be a dream come true. If it happens, I'm going to be enjoying every bit of it."

Chmelař made his NHL debut on 7 November 2025, against the Detroit Red Wings. He did not score but had a fight with Red Wings' Travis Hamonic. He was returned to Hartford on 9 November, after playing in two games for the Rangers. After a subsequent recall, Chmelař scored his first NHL goal in a game against the Toronto Maple Leafs on 5 March 2026.

== International play ==
Chmelař represented the Czechia junior team at the 2022 and 2023 World Junior Championships. At the 2022 World Junior Championships he only played three games and was primarily valued for his defensive ability. At the 2023 World Junior Championships he scored three goals and had two assists in seven games as Czechia earned the silver medal. Partially based on this performance, sportswriter Vincent Z. Mercogliano rated him as the Rangers' 10th best prospect in 2023.

== Playing style ==
Chmelař is a large winger who plays physically and is responsible defensively. He said "I want to be around the net and make the defense fear going into the corner with me."

== Career statistics ==
			Regular season					Playoffs
Season	Team	League	GP	G	A	Pts	PIM	GP	G	A	Pts	PIM
2022–23	Providence College	HE	33	7	6	13	26	—	—	—	—	—
2023–24	Providence College	HE	26	5	10	15	29	—	—	—	—	—
2023–24	Hartford Wolf Pack	AHL	7	2	0	2	2	10	2	1	3	0
2024–25	Hartford Wolf Pack	AHL	71	12	17	29	48	—	—	—	—	—
2025–26	Hartford Wolf Pack	AHL	46	8	17	25	42	—	—	—	—	—
2025–26	New York Rangers	NHL	28	4	2	6	11	—	—	—	—	—
NHL totals			28	4	2	6	11	—	—	—	—	—

=== International ===
Year	Team	Event	Result	GP	G	A	Pts	PIM
2021	Czechia	U18	7th	5	1	1	2	2
2022	Czechia	WJC	4th	3	1	0	1	25
2023	Czechia	WJC	2nd place, silver medalist(s)	7	3	2	5	0
2026	Czechia	WC	5th	8	1	1	2	0
Junior totals				15	5	3	8	27
Senior totals				8	1	1	2	0
