= Šimon Nemec =

Slovak ice hockey player (born 2004)

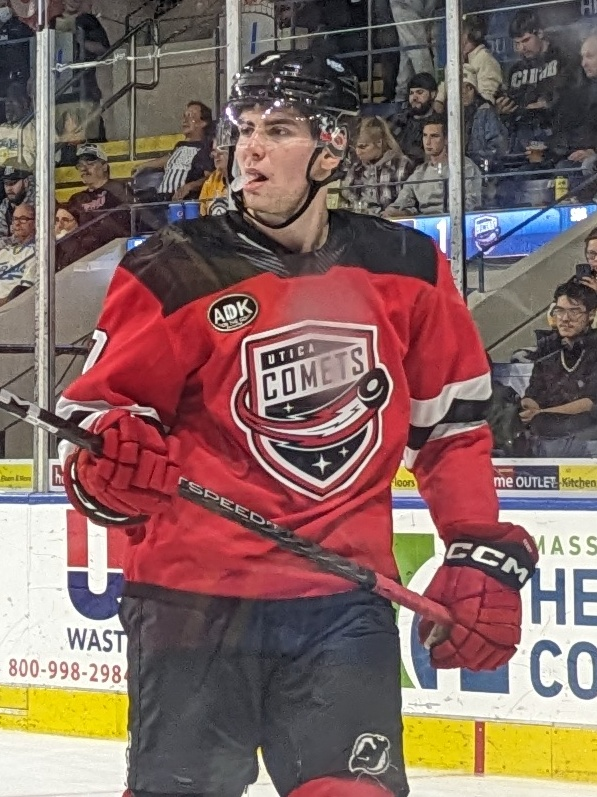
- Nemec with the Utica Comets in November 2023
- Born: 15 February 2004 (age 22) Liptovský Mikuláš, Slovakia
- Height: 6 ft 1 in (185 cm)
- Weight: 198 lb (90 kg; 14 st 2 lb)
- Position: Defence
- Shoots: Right
- NHL team Former teams: Calgary Flames; HK Nitra; New Jersey Devils
- National team: Slovakia
- NHL draft: 2nd overall, 2022; New Jersey Devils
- Playing career: 2019–present

Šimon Nemec (born 15 February 2004) is a Slovak professional ice hockey player who is a defenceman for the Calgary Flames of the National Hockey League (NHL). He was drafted second overall by the New Jersey Devils in the 2022 NHL entry draft, the second of back-to-back Slovak selections and the two highest-drafted Slovaks of all time with Juraj Slafkovský, and made his NHL debut with the Devils in 2023.

Competing internationally as part of Slovak national team, Nemec won a bronze medal at the 2022 Winter Olympics, which was the first Olympic medal for Slovakia in ice hockey. He is identified as part of a rising new generation of Slovak ice hockey players.

== Playing career ==
=== HK Nitra ===
Nemec was born in Liptovský Mikuláš, Slovakia, and played youth hockey for the local club, MHk 32 Liptovský Mikuláš. Nemec began playing at the highest level in Slovak hockey, Tipos Extraliga, starting in the 2019–20 season at the age of 15 with HK Nitra. In his 2019–20 season, he split his time between Tipos Extraliga, Slovak 2. Liga and Slovakia national junior team. After the conclusion of the season, in league play, he solely played in Tipos Extraliga.

Nemec was selected fourth overall by the Cape Breton Eagles in the 2021 Canadian Hockey League (CHL) import draft, but he elected instead to play his draft-eligible season in Slovakia.

Going into his draft year, Nemec improved his game and recorded one goal and 25 assists for 26 points in 39 games for HK Nitra in the 2021–22 Slovak Extraliga season. In the playoffs, he recorded five goals and 12 assists for 17 points in 19 games, taking his team to the finals, where HK Nitra lost in six games to HC Slovan Bratislava.

=== New Jersey Devils (2023–2026) ===
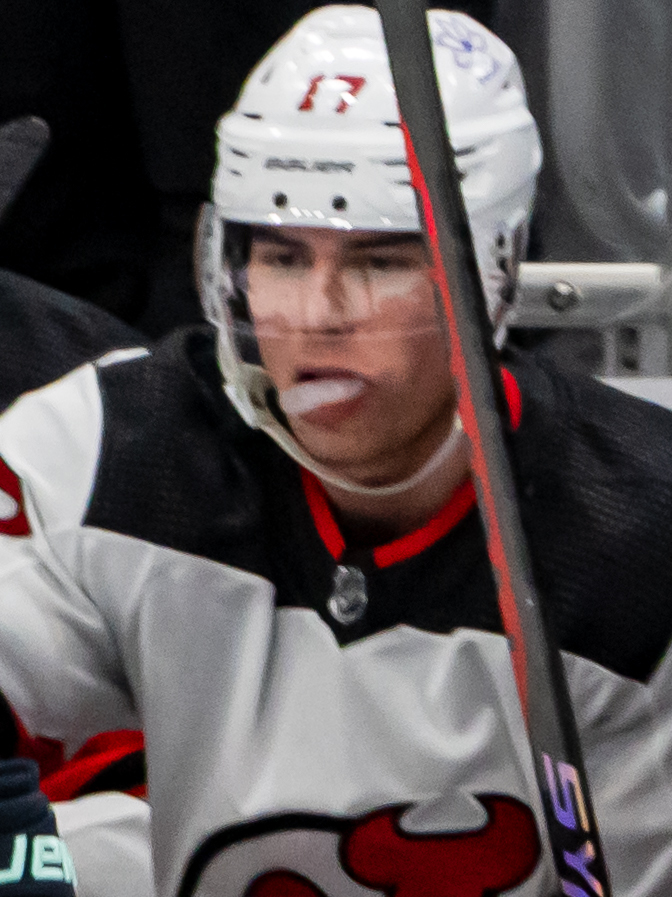
Nemec playing with the New Jersey Devils in November 2023

Following the 2021–22 Slovak Extraliga season, Nemec was seen as one of the top defensive prospects heading into the 2022 NHL entry draft and debated alongside Czech David Jiříček as the defenceman to be taken first. Throughout the year, multiple scouts considered him a top five selection. On 7 July 2022, he was selected second overall by the New Jersey Devils, after fellow countryman Juraj Slafkovský was selected first overall by the Montreal Canadiens, thus becoming the two highest drafted Slovak-born players in the NHL entry draft history. It was only the second time in history that a single European nation had the top two selections in the draft, after Russia in 2004. On 14 July, Nemec signed a three-year, entry-level contract with the Devils.

Nemec made the move to North America for the 2022–23 season, spending the entirety of the campaign with the Devils' American Hockey League (AHL) affiliate, the Utica Comets, and recording 12 goals and 22 assists in 65 games.

On 1 December 2023, the Devils recalled Nemec. He made his NHL debut that night, recording two assists in a 6–3 loss to the San Jose Sharks. He scored his first NHL goal on 7 December, the game-winner in a 2–1 victory over the Seattle Kraken. On 25 April 2025, during the 2025 Stanley Cup playoffs, Nemec scored the game-winning goal in the second overtime of game three in the Devils' first-round series against the Carolina Hurricanes.

Nemec recorded his first career hat trick and recorded the overtime game-winner in a 4–3 victory against the Chicago Blackhawks on 12 November 2025, becoming the youngest defenceman in NHL history to score a hat trick and an overtime winner in the same game.

=== Calgary Flames (2026–present) ===
On 23 June 2026, Nemec, along with Maxim Tsyplakov, was traded to the Calgary Flames in exchange for two conditional first-round picks, a 2026 second-round pick and prospect Étienne Morin. As a restricted free agent, Nemec was later signed to a five-year, $36.25 million contract extension with the Flames on 6 July.

== International play ==
Medal record

Men's ice hockey

Representing Slovakia

Winter Olympics
Bronze medal – third place	2022 Beijing	

Hlinka Gretzky Cup
Silver medal – second place	2021 Czech Republic/Slovakia	

Nemec participated as part of Slovakia junior team in the 2021 World Junior Championships, leading the team in scoring with four points and being named one of his team's top three players. He then made his senior IIHF international debut as part of the national senior team at the 2021 World Championship. Later in 2021 he served as Slovakia under-18 team's captain at the 2021 Hlinka Gretzky Cup, leading the team to a silver medal. He was voted most valuable player of the tournament, recording one goal and five assists for six points in five games.

After participating in the aborted 2022 World Junior Championships, cancelled as a result of the COVID-19 pandemic, Nemec was named to the Slovak squad for the 2022 Winter Olympics. He was one of three teenagers on the team, alongside fellow defenceman Samuel Kňažko and forward Juraj Slafkovský. He finished the tournament with an assist in seven games as Slovakia won the bronze medal game against Sweden, their first-ever Olympic medal in ice hockey. In his second outing of the year with the senior team at the 2022 World Championship, Nemec lead all Slovak defencemen in scoring with one goal and five assists in eight games.

== Personal life ==
Nemec's younger brother, Adam, is also an ice hockey player.

== Career statistics ==
=== Regular season and playoffs ===
			Regular season					Playoffs
Season	Team	League	GP	G	A	Pts	PIM	GP	G	A	Pts	PIM
2017–18	MHk 32 Liptovský Mikuláš	SVK U18	44	5	16	21	18	7	0	1	1	6
2018–19	MHk 32 Liptovský Mikuláš	SVK U18	52	10	25	35	78	—	—	—	—	—
2019–20	Team Slovakia U18	SVK U20	12	3	4	7	2	—	—	—	—	—
2019–20	Team Slovakia U18	SVK.2	16	1	3	4	12	—	—	—	—	—
2019–20	HK Nitra	SVK U20	13	3	5	8	4	—	—	—	—	—
2019–20	HK Nitra	SVK	12	0	3	3	0	—	—	—	—	—
2019–20	HK Levice	SVK.2	4	1	3	4	6	—	—	—	—	—
2020–21	HK Nitra	SVK	37	2	17	19	12	5	0	0	0	0
2021–22	HK Nitra	SVK	39	1	25	26	20	19	5	12	17	14
2022–23	Utica Comets	AHL	65	12	22	34	20	6	1	3	4	0
2023–24	Utica Comets	AHL	13	2	6	8	6	—	—	—	—	—
2023–24	New Jersey Devils	NHL	60	3	16	19	33	—	—	—	—	—
2024–25	New Jersey Devils	NHL	27	2	2	4	14	4	1	1	2	2
2024–25	Utica Comets	AHL	34	5	18	23	12	—	—	—	—	—
2025–26	New Jersey Devils	NHL	68	11	15	26	26	—	—	—	—	—
NHL totals			153	16	33	49	73	4	1	1	2	2

=== International ===
Year	Team	Event	Result	GP	G	A	Pts	PIM
2019	Slovakia	HG18	7th	4	0	0	0	0
2021	Slovakia	WJC	8th	5	0	4	4	2
2021	Slovakia	WC	8th	5	0	1	1	0
2021	Slovakia	HG18	2nd place, silver medalist(s)	5	1	5	6	2
2021	Slovakia	OGQ	Q	3	0	1	1	0
2022	Slovakia	OG	3rd place, bronze medalist(s)	7	0	1	1	2
2022	Slovakia	WJC18 D1A	9th	1	0	2	2	0
2022	Slovakia	WC	8th	8	1	5	6	2
2023	Slovakia	WJC	6th	5	1	4	5	10
2023	Slovakia	WC	9th	5	0	0	0	4
2024	Slovakia	WC	7th	8	1	6	7	2
2024	Slovakia	OGQ	Q	2	0	1	1	0
2026	Slovakia	OG	4th	6	0	2	2	2
Junior totals				20	2	15	17	14
Senior totals				39	2	16	18	12

Awards and achievements
Preceded by Chase Stillman	New Jersey Devils first-round draft pick 2022	Succeeded by Anton Silayev
