= Elias Pettersson (ice hockey, born 2004) =

Swedish ice hockey player (born 2004)

- Born: February 16, 2004 (age 22) Västerås, Sweden
- Height: 6 ft 2 in (188 cm)
- Weight: 185 lb (84 kg; 13 st 3 lb)
- Position: Defence
- Shoots: Left
- NHL team Former teams: Vancouver Canucks; Örebro HK
- NHL draft: 80th overall, 2022; Vancouver Canucks
- Playing career: 2022–present

Elias Nils Pettersson (born February 16, 2004) is a Swedish professional ice hockey player who is a defenceman for the Vancouver Canucks of the National Hockey League (NHL). Pettersson was selected in the third round, 80th overall, in the 2022 NHL entry draft by the Canucks.

== Playing career ==
In the 2020–21 season, Pettersson played for the junior team of Örebro HK, scoring seven points in 43 regular season games. He had low playing time, averaging 9:39 per game.

In the third round of the 2022 NHL entry draft, Pettersson was selected with the 80th overall pick by the Vancouver Canucks, who had previously drafted the forward sharing his name in 2017. On April 20, 2023, Pettersson was signed to a three-year, entry-level contract with the Canucks. The Canucks planned for Pettersson to continue playing in Sweden for the 2023–24 season, allowing his NHL contract to begin in the 2024–25 season.

During the 2023–24 season, Örebro loaned him to HockeyAllsvenskan's Västerås, his hometown team. While the arranged deal allowed Pettersson to play for either Örebro or Västerås, Örebro's sporting director Niklas Eriksson said the intention was for Pettersson to remain at Västerås. Eriksson also said the team consulted the Canucks while arranging the move. Pettersson said that he would have preferred staying at Örebro but that he appreciated increased play opportunities at Vasterås. In November, he was injured with a concussion, missing several Västerås games but playing in a match for the junior national team. In January 2024, the Canucks stated that Pettersson would visit North America after the Allsvenskan season concluded. Canucks general manager Patrik Allvin said that he planned for Pettersson to play for the Abbotsford Canucks, the Vancouver Canucks' American Hockey League (AHL) affiliate. Pettersson joined the Abbotsford Canucks on March 13, and finished the season with two assists in eight games.

Pettersson returned to Abbotsford to begin the 2024–25 season, and was named an AHL All-Star. However, he did not participate in the All-Star game due to his call-up with Vancouver. Pettersson made his NHL debut on January 25, 2025, in a game where he was a teammate with Elias Pettersson, a forward. He recorded his first NHL assist and point on February 2. Pettersson scored his first NHL goal on April 5, in a 6–2 win against the Anaheim Ducks. Pettersson's goal was the first of five goals in just 4 minutes and 30 seconds of game time, the fastest in team history at the time.

His style of play has been characterized as strong and physical.

== International play ==
Medal record

Representing Sweden

Men's ice hockey

World Junior Championships
Silver medal – second place	2024 Sweden	

World U18 Championships
Gold medal – first place	2022 Germany	

In 2023, Pettersson played for Sweden junior team at the 2023 World Junior Championships. He again represented Sweden at the 2024 World Juniors, winning a silver medal.

== Career statistics ==
=== Regular season and playoffs ===
			Regular season					Playoffs
Season	Team	League	GP	G	A	Pts	PIM	GP	G	A	Pts	PIM
2021–22	Örebro HK	J18	1	0	1	1	0	3	0	2	2	2
2021–22	Örebro HK	J20	37	10	8	18	38	6	2	8	10	4
2021–22	Örebro HK	SHL	17	0	1	1	0	—	—	—	—	—
2022–23	Örebro HK	J20	14	5	10	15	10	2	0	0	0	0
2022–23	Örebro HK	SHL	43	1	6	7	6	13	0	0	0	0
2023–24	Örebro HK	J20	4	0	7	7	0	—	—	—	—	—
2023–24	Örebro HK	SHL	4	0	0	0	0	—	—	—	—	—
2023–24	Västerås IK	Allsv	34	3	11	14	8	—	—	—	—	—
2023–24	Abbotsford Canucks	AHL	8	0	2	2	6	1	0	0	0	2
2024–25	Abbotsford Canucks	AHL	38	1	12	13	38	—	—	—	—	—
2024–25	Vancouver Canucks	NHL	28	1	2	3	17	—	—	—	—	—
2025–26	Vancouver Canucks	NHL	70	3	7	10	39	—	—	—	—	—
2025–26	Abbotsford Canucks	AHL	3	0	0	0	2	—	—	—	—	—
SHL totals			64	1	7	8	6	13	0	0	0	0
NHL totals			98	4	9	13	56	—	—	—	—	—

=== International ===
Year	Team	Event	Result	GP	G	A	Pts	PIM
2021	Sweden	HG18	3rd place, bronze medalist(s)	5	1	1	2	8
2022	Sweden	U18	1st place, gold medalist(s)	6	0	0	0	2
2023	Sweden	WJC	4th	7	0	3	3	6
2024	Sweden	WJC	2nd place, silver medalist(s)	7	0	2	2	0
Junior totals				25	1	6	7	16
