= David Jiříček =

Czech ice hockey player (born 2003)

- Born: 28 November 2003 (age 22) Klatovy, Czech Republic
- Height: 6 ft 4 in (193 cm)
- Weight: 204 lb (93 kg; 14 st 8 lb)
- Position: Defence
- Shoots: Right
- NHL team Former teams: Philadelphia Flyers; Columbus Blue Jackets; Minnesota Wild
- National team: Czech Republic
- NHL draft: 6th overall, 2022; Columbus Blue Jackets
- Playing career: 2019–present

David Jiříček (born 28 November 2003) is a Czech professional ice hockey player who is a defenceman for the Philadelphia Flyers of the National Hockey League (NHL). He was drafted sixth overall by the Columbus Blue Jackets in the 2022 NHL entry draft.

Competing internationally as part of Czech Republic national team, he won a bronze medal at the 2022 IIHF World Championship, and a silver medal with the junior national team at the 2023 IIHF World Junior Championship.

== Playing career ==
=== Extraliga ===
Jiříček made his professional debut for HC Škoda Plzeň during the 2019–20 season where he appeared in four games. During the 2020–21 season, in his first full season with Plzeň, he recorded three goals and six assists in 34 games. Following his rookie season, he was named Czech Extraliga Rookie of the Year.

He was drafted 54th overall by the Spokane Chiefs in the 2020 CHL Import Draft.

Jiříček played only 29 games in the 2021–22 season after a knee injury suffered at the 2022 World Junior Ice Hockey Championships.

=== Columbus Blue Jackets ===
In the leadup to the 2022 NHL entry draft, Jiříček was considered a top prospect, and for much of the year there was debate as to whether he or Slovak Šimon Nemec would be the first defenceman taken. Following Jiříček's injury at the World Junior Championships, Nemec became favoured to go first. Ultimately, Nemec was taken second overall by the New Jersey Devils, while Jiříček was drafted sixth overall by the Columbus Blue Jackets.

Jiříček began his North American professional career playing with the Cleveland Monsters, the Blue Jackets' AHL affiliate. He was called up to make his NHL debut on 28 October 2022, in the midst of a string of injuries to the Columbus defence corps. Returning to Cleveland, he was named the AHL Rookie of the Month for December 2022. Jiříček was initially named as the Monsters' representative to the 2023 AHL All-Star Classic, but he subsequently was unavailable to participate and was replaced by teammate Jake Christiansen. He ultimately appeared in 55 games with the Monsters, recording 6 goals and 32 assists, leading all rookie defencemen with 0.75 points per game.

On October 14, 2023, Jiříček scored his first career NHL goal in a 5–3 victory against the New York Rangers. During the 2023–24 season, his first full season in the NHL, he recorded one goal and nine assists in 43 games for the Blue Jackets. During the 2024–25 season, he recorded one assist in six games with the Blue Jackets, and two goals and one assist in four games for the Cleveland Monsters.

=== Minnesota Wild ===
On 30 November 2024, Jiříček was traded from the Blue Jackets to the Minnesota Wild in exchange for Daemon Hunt and four draft picks, including a first-round pick in the 2025 NHL entry draft. He was assigned to the Wild's AHL affiliate, the Iowa Wild. He was later recalled by Minnesota and registered a goal and assist through 6 games with the Wild. While reassigned back to the AHL with Iowa, Jiříček posted 7 assists through 27 appearances before his season was ended through injury on 28 March 2025, after suffering a lacerated spleen. On October 17, 2025, Jiříček was again reassigned to the Iowa Wild.

=== Philadelphia Flyers ===
On 6 March 2026, Jiříček was traded to the Philadelphia Flyers in exchange for Bobby Brink.

== International play ==
Medal record

Representing Czech Republic

Ice hockey

World Championships
Bronze medal – third place	2022 Finland	

World Junior Championships
Silver medal – second place	2023 Canada	

Jiříček represented the Czech Republic at the 2021 World Junior Ice Hockey Championships, where he recorded one assist in four games. He rejoined the national junior team at the 2022 World Junior Ice Hockey Championships the following year. However, he suffered an injury in his first game after a knee-on-knee collision with Team Canada forward Will Cuylle, and was forced to withdraw from the tournament. Jiříček returned to the ice for the 2022 IIHF World Championship, where he played five games in his debut with the senior national team, before a planned withdrawal to avoid overtaxing his knee. He shared in the team's bronze medal win, the first World medal for the Czech Republic in ten years.

Named once again to the national junior team for the 2023 IIHF World Junior Championship, Jiříček's travel to the event in Halifax was affected by Winter Storm Elliott, which caused his equipment to be initially lost in transit. It was ultimately delivered five hours prior to the team's first game of the tournament. The tournament was an international breakout for Jiříček, who was cited as a central player in Czechia's deep run to the event final, where they ultimately took the silver medal after a loss to Canada. He was given the award for Best Defenceman of the event by the IIHF directorate, and was also named to the Media All-Star Team.

== Personal life ==
Jiříček is the older brother of Adam Jiříček, who was drafted 16th overall by the St. Louis Blues in the 2024 NHL entry draft.

== Career statistics ==
=== Regular season and playoffs ===
			Regular season					Playoffs
Season	Team	League	GP	G	A	Pts	PIM	GP	G	A	Pts	PIM
2019–20	HC Škoda Plzeň	ELH	4	0	0	0	2	—	—	—	—	—
2019–20	SHC Klatovy	Czech.2	—	—	—	—	—	1	0	0	0	0
2020–21	HC Škoda Plzeň	ELH	34	3	6	9	34	2	0	1	1	4
2021–22	HC Škoda Plzeň	ELH	29	5	6	11	49	—	—	—	—	—
2022–23	Cleveland Monsters	AHL	55	6	32	38	36	—	—	—	—	—
2022–23	Columbus Blue Jackets	NHL	4	0	0	0	2	—	—	—	—	—
2023–24	Columbus Blue Jackets	NHL	43	1	9	10	22	—	—	—	—	—
2023–24	Cleveland Monsters	AHL	29	7	12	19	21	14	3	8	11	10
2024–25	Columbus Blue Jackets	NHL	6	0	1	1	4	—	—	—	—	—
2024–25	Cleveland Monsters	AHL	4	2	1	3	2	—	—	—	—	—
2024–25	Iowa Wild	AHL	27	0	7	7	15	—	—	—	—	—
2024–25	Minnesota Wild	NHL	6	1	1	2	2	—	—	—	—	—
2025–26	Minnesota Wild	NHL	25	0	0	0	14	—	—	—	—	—
2025–26	Iowa Wild	AHL	24	2	8	10	12	—	—	—	—	—
2025–26	Lehigh Valley Phantoms	AHL	15	2	1	3	13	—	—	—	—	—
2025–26	Philadelphia Flyers	NHL	1	0	0	0	2	—	—	—	—	—
ELH totals			67	8	12	20	85	2	0	1	1	4
NHL totals			86	2	11	13	46	—	—	—	—	—

=== International ===
Year	Team	Event	Result	GP	G	A	Pts	PIM
2021	Czech Republic	U18	7th	4	0	0	0	8
2021	Czech Republic	WJC	7th	5	1	1	2	2
2022	Czech Republic	WC	3rd place, bronze medalist(s)	5	1	1	2	0
2022	Czech Republic	WJC	4th	7	0	3	3	2
2023	Czechia	WJC	2nd place, silver medalist(s)	7	3	4	7	2
Junior totals				23	4	8	12	14
Senior totals				5	1	1	2	0

== Awards and honours ==
Award	Year	Ref
AHL
Rookie of the Month	December 2022	
All-Star Game	2023	
ELH
Rookie of the Year	2021	
International
World Junior Championship Best Defenceman	2023	
World Junior Championship Media All-Star Team	2023	

Awards and achievements
Preceded by Corson Ceulemans	Columbus Blue Jackets first-round draft pick 2022	Succeeded by Denton Mateychuk
