= Filip Bystedt =

Swedish ice hockey player (born 2004)

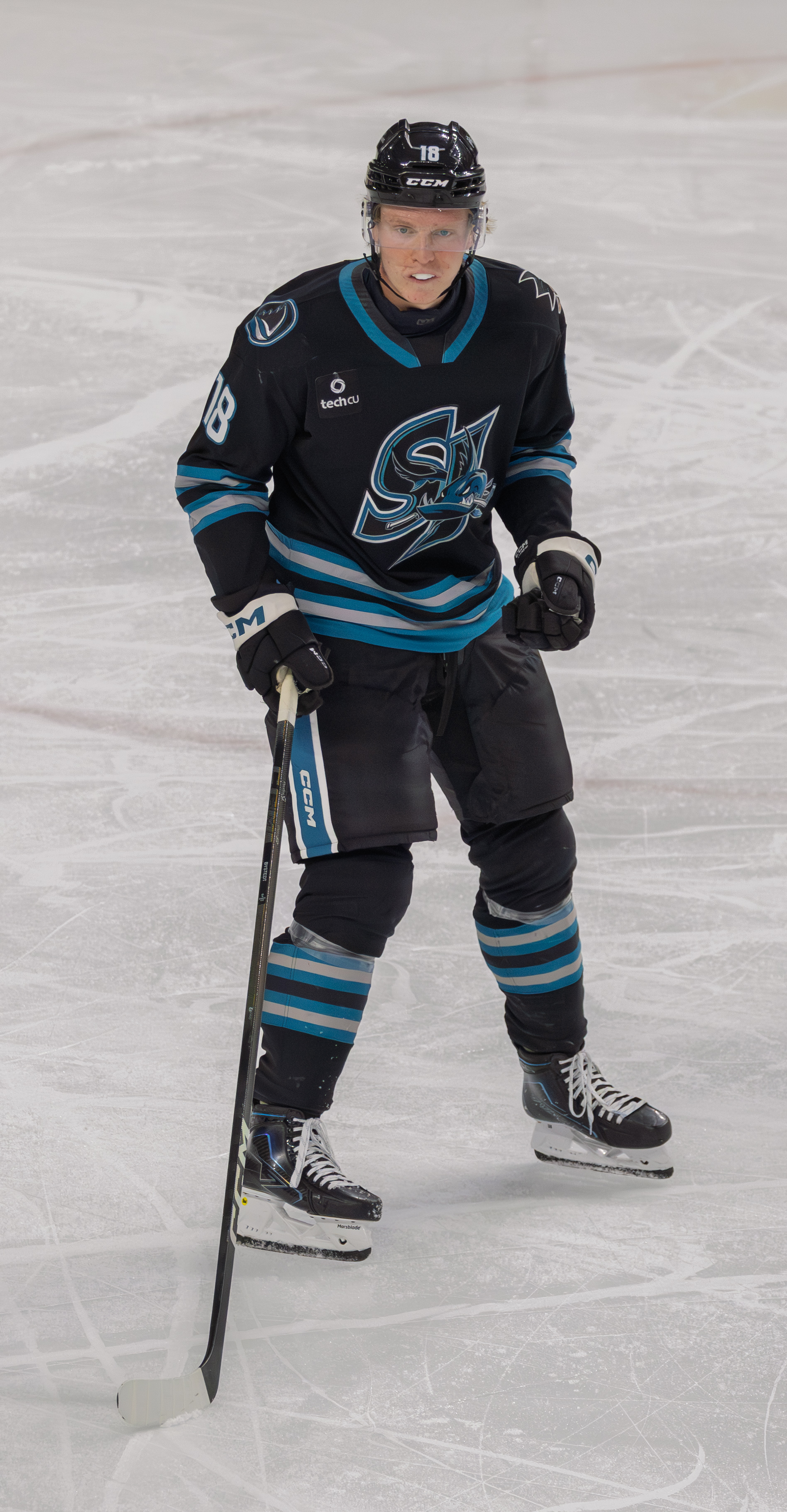
- Bystedt in 2026
- Born: 4 February 2004 (age 22) Linköping, Sweden
- Height: 6 ft 2 in (188 cm)
- Weight: 187 lb (85 kg; 13 st 5 lb)
- Position: Centre
- Shoots: Left
- NHL team (P) Cur. team Former teams: San Jose Sharks; San Jose Barracuda (AHL); Linköping HC
- NHL draft: 27th overall, 2022; San Jose Sharks
- Playing career: 2021–present

Filip Bystedt (born 4 February 2004) is a Swedish professional ice hockey centre for the San Jose Barracuda of the American Hockey League (AHL), while under contract to the San Jose Sharks of the National Hockey League (NHL). Bystedt was drafted 27th overall by the Sharks in the 2022 NHL entry draft.

== Playing career ==
Bystedt was signed to a three-year, entry-level contract with the San Jose Sharks on 12 June 2023. In April 2024, he was assigned to the San Jose Barracuda after his season with Linköping HC of the Swedish Hockey League concluded.

== International play ==
Medal record

Representing Sweden

Ice hockey

World Junior Championships
Silver medal – second place	2024 Sweden	

World U18 Championships
Gold medal – first place	2022 Germany	

Bystedt represented Sweden at the 2022 IIHF World U18 Championships where he recorded two goals and one assist in six games and won a gold medal.

Bystedt represented Sweden at the 2024 World Junior Ice Hockey Championships and won a silver medal.

== Career statistics ==
=== Regular season and playoffs ===
			Regular season					Playoffs
Season	Team	League	GP	G	A	Pts	PIM	GP	G	A	Pts	PIM
2018–19	Linköping HC	J18	12	2	3	5	0	—	—	—	—	—
2019–20	Linköping HC	J18	15	6	9	15	6	—	—	—	—	—
2020–21	Linköping HC	J20	15	5	7	12	2	—	—	—	—	—
2020–21	Linköping HC	SHL	1	0	0	0	0	—	—	—	—	—
2021–22	Linköping HC	J20	40	16	33	49	40	8	1	9	10	4
2021–22	Linköping HC	SHL	15	1	1	2	0	—	—	—	—	—
2022–23	Linköping HC	SHL	45	7	13	20	8	—	—	—	—	—
2022–23	Linköping HC	J20	1	0	0	0	0	—	—	—	—	—
2023–24	Linköping HC	SHL	47	8	9	17	2	4	1	1	2	0
2023–24	San Jose Barracuda	AHL	8	4	3	7	8	—	—	—	—	—
2024–25	San Jose Barracuda	AHL	50	12	19	31	26	6	3	0	3	2
2025–26	San Jose Barracuda	AHL	65	22	38	60	22	2	0	1	1	0
SHL totals			108	16	23	39	10	4	1	1	2	0

=== International ===
Year	Team	Event	Result	GP	G	A	Pts	PIM
2021	Sweden	HG18	3rd place, bronze medalist(s)	5	3	4	7	4
2022	Sweden	U18	1st place, gold medalist(s)	6	2	1	3	2
2023	Sweden	WJC	4th	7	4	6	10	4
2024	Sweden	WJC	2nd place, silver medalist(s)	7	3	1	4	0
Junior totals				25	12	12	24	10

Awards and achievements
Preceded by William Eklund	San Jose Sharks first-round draft pick 2022	Succeeded by Will Smith
Preceded by Linus Karlsson	Winner of the SHL Rookie of the Year award 2023	Succeeded by Jonathan Lekkerimäki
