= Aleksi Heimosalmi =

Finnish ice hockey player (born 2003)

- Born: 8 May 2003 (age 23) Pori, Finland
- Height: 5 ft 11 in (180 cm)
- Weight: 181 lb (82 kg; 12 st 13 lb)
- Position: Defence
- NHL team (P) Cur. team Former teams: Carolina Hurricanes; Chicago Wolves (AHL); Porin Ässät
- NHL draft: 44th overall, 2021; Carolina Hurricanes
- Playing career: 2021–present

Aleksi Heimosalmi (8 May 2003) is a Finnish professional ice hockey defenceman for the Chicago Wolves in the American Hockey League (AHL) while under contract as a prospect to the Carolina Hurricanes of the National Hockey League (NHL). He played in his native Finland with Porin Ässät, where he also played as a junior player. Heimosalmi played his first professional game in the Liiga for Porin Ässät on 10 October 2021.

== Playing career ==
=== Junior ===
Heimosalmi started ice hockey with the Porin Ässät as a four year old.

During the 2019–20 season Heimosalmi played with Ässät U18 for 25 games where he scored 15 points. He also played 3 games with Ässät U20 with no points. The next season Heimosalmi played fully with the U20 team. He played a 35-game and 21 point season.

=== Professional ===
In April 2021 Heimosalmi signed a three-year contract with the Porin Ässät.

The Carolina Hurricanes drafted Heimosalmi in the second round as the 44th player in the 2021 NHL entry draft. He was drafted somewhat unexpectedly as the first Finnish player at the drafting event, because e.g. Aatu Räty was already widely expected to be drafted in the first round. Heimosalmi signed a three-year entry-level contract with the club in August, even before the first professional league match. His seasonal salary on the NHL side in the first two seasons of the contract is $750,000 and in the third season $775,000. On the American Hockey League (AHL) side, Heimosalmi's seasonal salary is $80,000. The contract also includes a $277,500 signing bonus.

Heimosalmi played the 2021–22 season on loan in Ässät. He made his Liiga debut in the opening round of the regular season on 10 September 2021, against Vaasan Sport. Heimosalmi was placed in Ässät's second line next to Roni Sevänen. He got 13.37 minutes of ice time in the match. Heimosalmi had relatively high expectations due to the previous spring's successful U18 World Championship competitions and second-round NHL draft, but despite the expectations, he did not manage to fully meet them and Heimosalmi scored three assists in 47 regular season games during his rookie season. He also strengthened the club's U20 team in the playoffs.

In the 2022–23 season, Heimosalmi continued on loan at Ässät. He scored the opening goal of his Liiga career on 1 October 2022, against KooKoo. In total, Heimosalmi played 45 regular season matches in the league during the season with four goals and 11 assists for 15 points and eight playoff matches with one goal and two assists for three points. He scored the first playoff goal of his Liiga career in the second quarter-final match on 20 March 2023, against Ilves. Heimosalmi's goal was the winning goal of the match, which ended in a 5–2 victory for Ässät, and it evened the series at 1–1. Ässät alumni Jokke Heinänen chose him as the number one star of the Alumni Stars of the Match. However, Ilves eventually progressed to the semi-finals with a 4–1 series win. Heimosalmi shared the Ässät's playoff internal plus-minus stat win with Derek Barach and Ian McCoshen, reading +3.

== Career statistics ==
=== Regular season and playoffs ===
| | | | Regular season | | | | | Playoffs |
| Season | Team | League | GP | G | A | Pts | PIM | GP | G | A | Pts | PIM |
|---|---|---|---|---|---|---|---|---|---|---|---|---|
| 2019–20 | Ässät | U20 | 3 | 0 | 0 | 0 | 0 | — | — | — | — | — |
| 2020–21 | Ässät | U20 | 35 | 4 | 17 | 21 | 22 | 2 | 0 | 0 | 0 | 0 |
| 2021–22 | Ässät | U20 | 3 | 0 | 1 | 1 | 0 | 3 | 1 | 1 | 2 | 0 |
| 2021–22 | Ässät | Liiga | 47 | 0 | 3 | 3 | 24 | — | — | — | — | — |
| 2022–23 | Ässät | Liiga | 45 | 4 | 11 | 15 | 12 | 8 | 1 | 2 | 3 | 2 |
| 2023–24 | Ässät | Liiga | 47 | 2 | 14 | 16 | 12 | — | — | — | — | — |
| 2024–25 | Chicago Wolves | AHL | 56 | 5 | 9 | 14 | 26 | 1 | 0 | 0 | 0 | 0 |
| 2025–26 | Chicago Wolves | AHL | 52 | 4 | 13 | 17 | 40 | 7 | 1 | 1 | 2 | 0 |
| Liiga totals | | | 139 | 6 | 28 | 34 | 48 | 8 | 1 | 2 | 3 | 2 |

=== International ===
Medal record

Men's ice hockey

Representing Finland

World Junior Championships
| Silver medal – second place | 2022 Canada | |

| Year | Team | Event | Result | GP | G | A | Pts | PIM |
|---|---|---|---|---|---|---|---|---|
| 2019 | Finland | U17 | 7th | 5 | 0 | 1 | 1 | 0 |
| 2021 | Finland | U18 | 4th | 7 | 2 | 6 | 8 | 2 |
| 2022 | Finland | WJC | 2nd place, silver medalist(s) | 7 | 1 | 6 | 7 | 2 |
| 2023 | Finland | WJC | 5th | 5 | 0 | 2 | 2 | 6 |
| Junior totals | | | | 24 | 3 | 15 | 18 | 10 |
