= Kasper Puutio =

Finnish ice hockey player

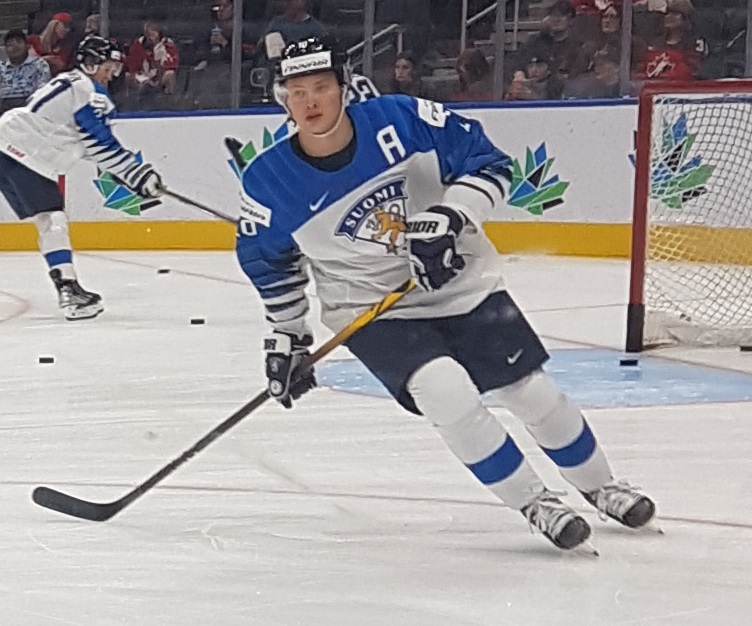
- Puutio at the 2022 World Junior Ice Hockey Championships
- Born: 3 June 2002 (age 24) Vaasa, Finland
- Height: 5 ft 11 in (180 cm)
- Weight: 180 lb (82 kg; 12 st 12 lb)
- Position: Defenceman
- Shoots: Right
- Liiga team Former teams: KalPa; Oulun Kärpät
- NHL draft: 153rd overall, 2020; Florida Panthers
- Playing career: 2020–present

Kasper Akseli Puutio (born 3 June 2002) is a Finnish professional ice hockey defenceman for KalPa of the Finnish Liiga. He previously played for Oulun Kärpät.

== Playing career ==
Puutio was drafted first overall by the Swift Current Broncos in the 2019 CHL Import Draft. He recorded one goal and 15 assists in 35 games for the Broncos. On 10 January 2020 he was traded to the Everett Silvertips. He recorded four goals and eight assists in 21 games for the Silvertips before the season was cancelled due to the COVID-19 pandemic.

Puutio was drafted in the fifth round, 153rd overall, by the Florida Panthers in the 2020 NHL entry draft. He made his professional debut for Oulun Kärpät during the 2020–21 season where he recorded two goals and one assist in 29 games. On 3 May 2021 he signed a two-year contract with KalPa.

== International play ==
Medal record

Ice hockey

Representing Finland

World Junior Championships
Silver medal – second place	2022 Canada	
Bronze medal – third place	2021 Canada	

Puutio represented Finland at the 2021 World Junior Ice Hockey Championships where he recorded two assists in seven games and won a bronze medal. He will again represent Finland at the 2022 World Junior Ice Hockey Championships.

== Career statistics ==
=== Regular season and playoffs ===
			Regular season					Playoffs
Season	Team	League	GP	G	A	Pts	PIM	GP	G	A	Pts	PIM
2018–19	Oulun Kärpät	Jr. A	31	1	3	4	8	—	—	—	—	—
2019–20	Swift Current Broncos	WHL	35	1	15	16	24	—	—	—	—	—
2019–20	Everett Silvertips	WHL	21	4	8	12	12	—	—	—	—	—
2020–21	Oulun Kärpät	Liiga	29	2	1	3	0	1	0	0	0	0
2020–21	Oulun Kärpät	Jr. A	2	0	0	0	0	—	—	—	—	—
2021–22	KalPa	Liiga	51	5	5	10	20	—	—	—	—	—
2021–22	KalPa	Jr. A	—	—	—	—	—	10	3	8	11	4
Liiga totals			80	7	6	13	20	1	0	0	0	0

=== International ===
Year	Team	Event	Result	GP	G	A	Pts	PIM
2018	Finland	U17	2nd place, silver medalist(s)	6	0	4	4	2
2019	Finland	HG18	4th	3	0	3	3	4
2021	Finland	WJC	3rd place, bronze medalist(s)	7	0	2	2	0
2022	Finland	WJC	2nd place, silver medalist(s)	7	4	3	7	2
Junior totals				23	4	12	16	8
