= Samuel Helenius =

Finnish-American ice hockey player (born 2002)

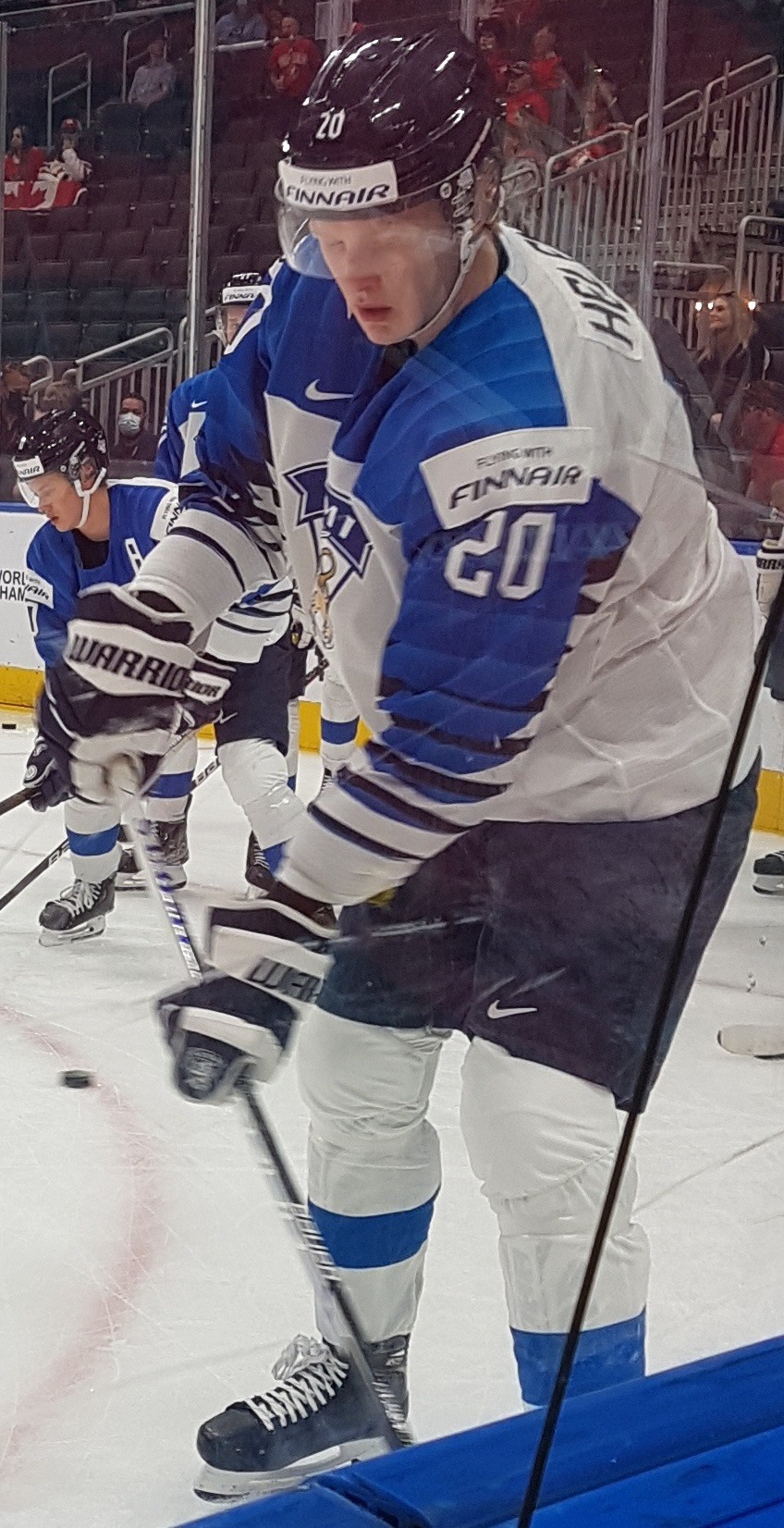
- Helenius at the 2022 World Junior Championships
- Born: 26 November 2002 (age 23) Dallas, Texas, U.S.
- Height: 6 ft 6 in (198 cm)
- Weight: 225 lb (102 kg; 16 st 1 lb)
- Position: Forward
- Shoots: Left
- NHL team Former teams: Los Angeles Kings; JYP Jyväskylä
- NHL draft: 59th overall, 2021; Los Angeles Kings
- Playing career: 2020–present

Samuel Helenius (born 26 November 2002) is an American-born Finnish professional ice hockey player who is a forward for the Los Angeles Kings in the National Hockey League (NHL). He was selected by the Kings in the second round, 59th overall, of the 2021 NHL entry draft.

== Playing career ==
Helenius played in the Jokerit junior development system in his native Finland. Moving to fellow Finnish club, JYP Jyväskylä, Helenius made his professional debut in the Liiga during the 2020–21 season.

In his first full season in the Liiga, Helenius collected seven goals and 14 points in 54 games with JYP. Helenius was selected at the 2021 NHL entry draft in the second-round, 58th overall, by the Los Angeles Kings who traded a third and fourth-round pick to the Carolina Hurricanes in order to move back into the second round.

On 13 August 2021, Helenius was signed to a three-year, entry-level contract with the Kings.

Continuing his development in the Liiga with JYP Jyväskylä in the 2021–22 season, Helenius was named an alternate captain and posted three goals and nine points in 48 games. On 28 March 2022, Helenius left Finland and moved to North America where he was assigned by the Kings to primary American Hockey League (AHL) affiliate, the Ontario Reign, for the remainder of the season.

On 2 December 2025, Helenius signed a two-year, $1.75 million contract extension with the Kings through the 2027–28 NHL season.

== Personal life ==
Born in Dallas, when his father was a member of the Dallas Stars, Samuel is the son of former NHL defenceman and enforcer, Sami Helenius. He is a dual citizen of Finland and the U.S.

== Career statistics ==
=== Regular season and playoffs ===
			Regular season					Playoffs
Season	Team	League	GP	G	A	Pts	PIM	GP	G	A	Pts	PIM
2019–20	Jokerit	Jr. A	51	13	11	24	40	1	0	0	0	0
2020–21	JYP Jyväskylä	Liiga	54	7	7	14	61	—	—	—	—	—
2021–22	JYP Jyväskylä	Liiga	48	3	6	9	76	—	—	—	—	—
2021–22	JYP Jyväskylä	Jr. A	1	0	1	1	0	—	—	—	—	—
2021–22	Ontario Reign	AHL	12	1	0	1	6	—	—	—	—	—
2022–23	Ontario Reign	AHL	61	2	12	14	59	—	—	—	—	—
2023–24	Ontario Reign	AHL	69	8	11	19	53	8	0	1	1	14
2024–25	Ontario Reign	AHL	20	2	4	6	38	—	—	—	—	—
2024–25	Los Angeles Kings	NHL	50	4	3	7	25	6	0	1	1	0
2025–26	Los Angeles Kings	NHL	53	5	4	9	50	4	0	0	0	14
Liiga totals			102	10	13	23	137	—	—	—	—	—
NHL totals			103	9	7	16	75	10	0	1	1	14

=== International ===
Medal record

Men's ice hockey

Representing Finland

World Junior Championships
Silver medal – second place	2022 Canada	
Bronze medal – third place	2021 Canada	

Year	Team	Event	Result	GP	G	A	Pts	PIM
2021	Finland	WJC	3rd place, bronze medalist(s)	7	2	2	4	18
2022	Finland	WJC	2nd place, silver medalist(s)	6	1	0	1	2
Junior totals				13	3	2	5	20
