= Theodor Niederbach =

Swedish ice hockey player (born 2002)

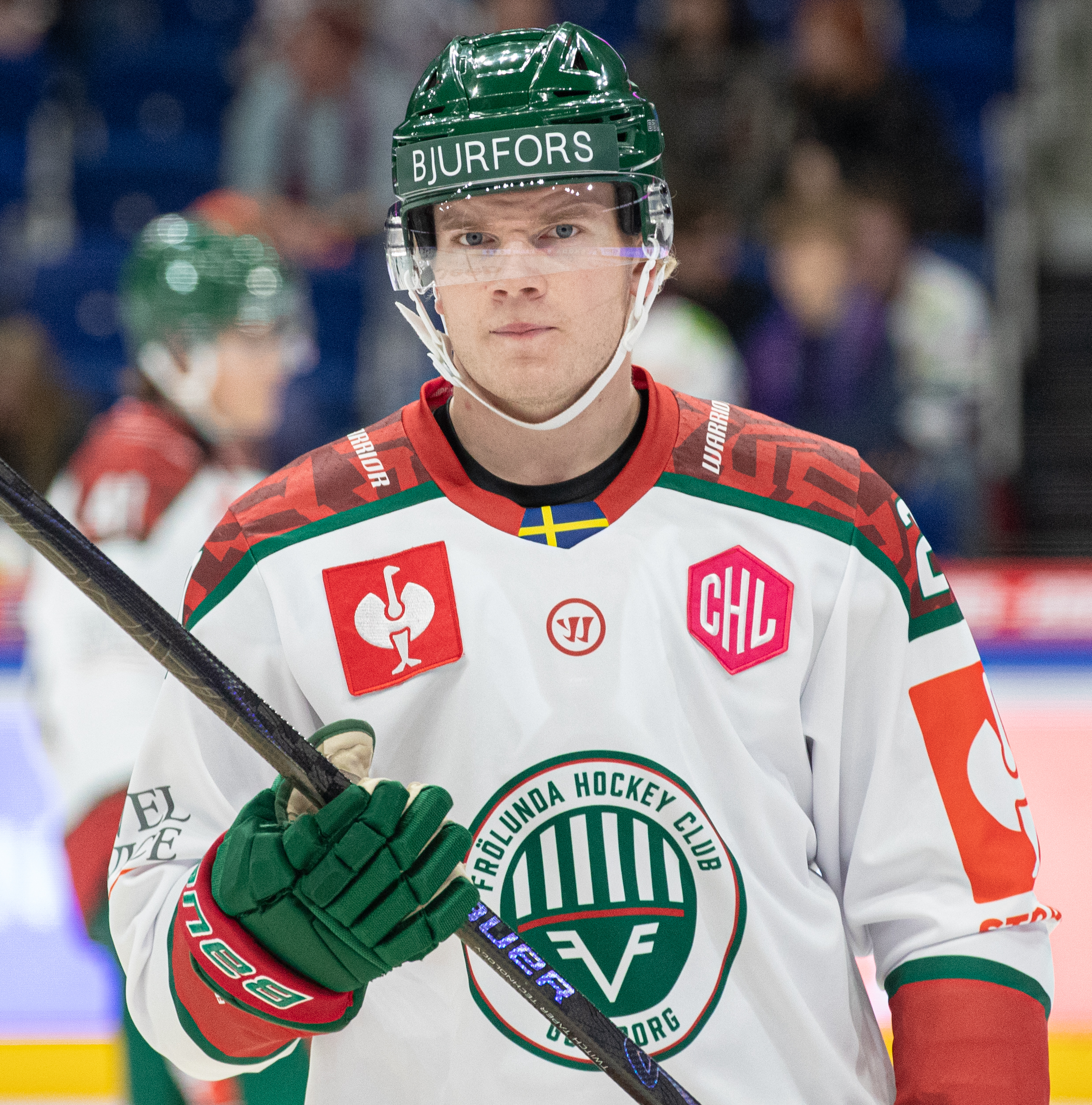
- Niederbach playing for Modo Hockey
- Born: 25 February 2002 (age 24) Bjästa, Sweden
- Height: 5 ft 11 in (180 cm)
- Weight: 172 lb (78 kg; 12 st 4 lb)
- Position: Centre/Winger
- Shoots: Right
- NHL team (P) Cur. team Former teams: Washington Capitals; Hershey Bears (AHL); Frölunda HC; Rögle BK; MoDo Hockey
- NHL draft: 51st overall, 2020; Detroit Red Wings
- Playing career: 2020–present

Theodor Niederbach (born 25 February 2002) is a Swedish professional ice hockey forward currently playing for the Hershey Bears in the American Hockey League (AHL) while under contract to the Washington Capitals of the National Hockey League (NHL). Niederbach was drafted 51st overall by the Detroit Red Wings in the 2020 NHL entry draft.

== Playing career ==
Niederbach played as a youth within Frölunda HC organization and following his selection in the 2020 NHL entry draft, made his professional debut in the highest Swedish ice-hockey division, the Swedish Hockey League (SHL) during the 2020–21 season. He moved to fellow SHL club, Rögle BK for the 2022–23 season and played a brief stint with 1 goal in 17 games before moving to MoDo Hockey of the then HockeyAllsvenskan on 23 November 2023.

In helping Modo return to the SHL, Niederbach recorded single-season career-highs with 19 assists and 33 points in 51 games with MoDo in the 2024–25 season.

After Modo's relegation to the Allsvenskan, Niederbach continued in the SHL having returned to his original club, Frölunda HC in 2025–26, and notched a career-high 13 goals through 52 regular season appearances.

As an un-signed draft pick by the Red Wings, Niederbach was signed to a one-year, two-way contract with the Washington Capitals for the 2026–27 season on 8 May 2026.

== Career statistics ==
=== Regular season and playoffs ===
			Regular season					Playoffs
Season	Team	League	GP	G	A	Pts	PIM	GP	G	A	Pts	PIM
2019–20	Frölunda HC	J20	40	15	33	48	12	—	—	—	—	—
2020–21	Frölunda HC	J20	19	13	22	35	8	—	—	—	—	—
2020–21	Frölunda HC	SHL	20	3	2	5	2	7	0	1	1	4
2020–21	Modo Hockey	Allsv	15	3	6	9	6	—	—	—	—	—
2021–22	Frölunda HC	SHL	51	9	7	16	12	9	1	2	3	0
2022–23	Rögle BK	SHL	17	1	0	1	2	—	—	—	—	—
2022–23	Modo Hockey	Allsv	31	7	11	18	31	17	4	8	12	4
2023–24	Modo Hockey	SHL	43	6	7	13	31	—	—	—	—	—
2024–25	Modo Hockey	SHL	51	10	23	33	8	—	—	—	—	—
2025–26	Frölunda HC	SHL	52	13	19	32	16	6	1	1	2	2
SHL totals			238	42	58	100	71	28	2	5	7	10

Medal record

Representing Sweden

Ice hockey

World Junior Championships
Bronze medal – third place	2022 Canada	

=== International ===
Year	Team	Event	Result	GP	G	A	Pts	PIM
2021	Sweden	WJC	5th	5	2	0	2	0
2022	Sweden	WJC	3rd place, bronze medalist(s)	7	1	3	4	29
Junior totals				12	3	3	6	29
