= Helge Grans =

Swedish ice hockey player (born 2002)

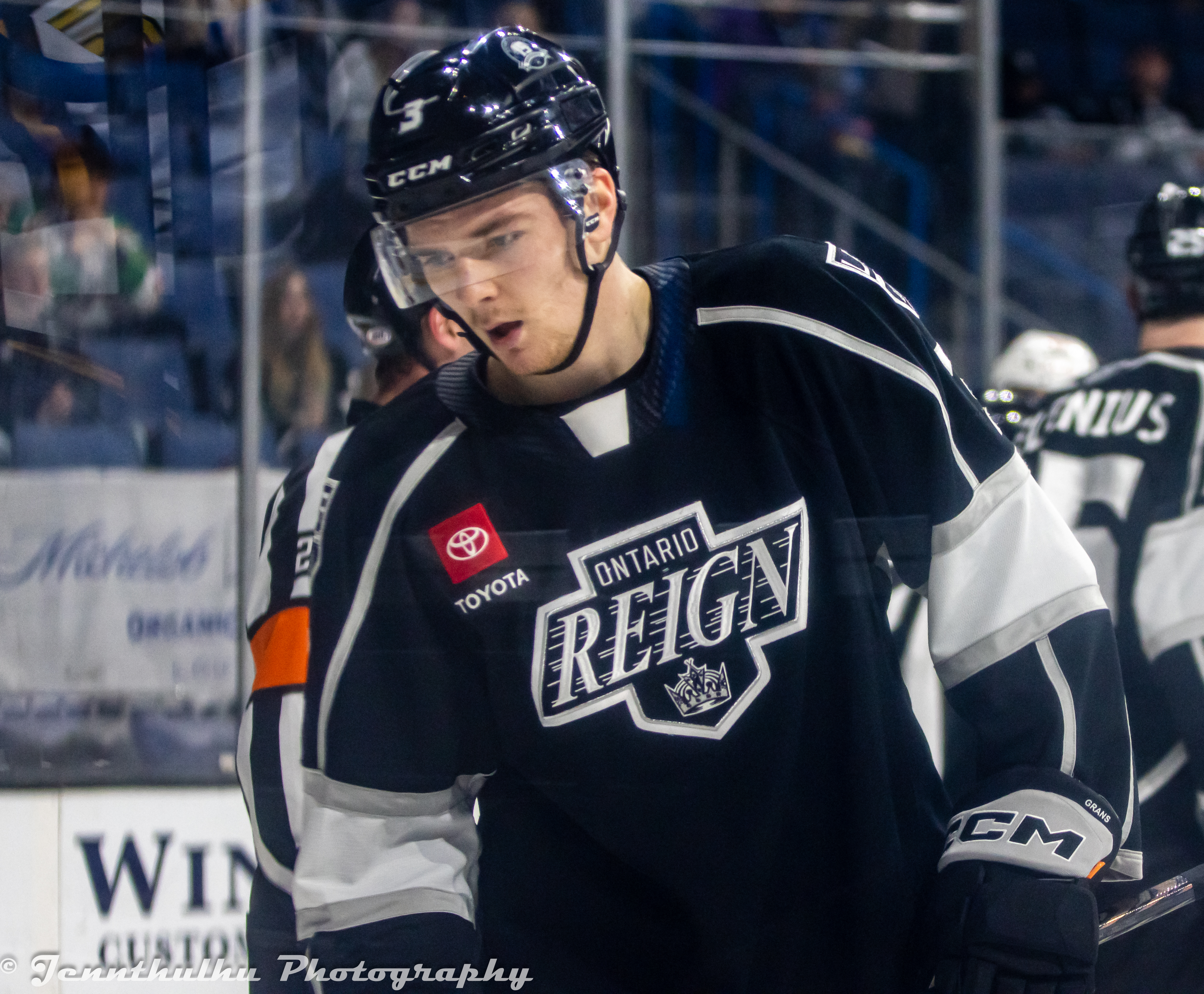
- Grans with the Ontario Reign in 2023
- Born: 10 May 2002 (age 24) Ljungby, Sweden
- Height: 6 ft 3 in (191 cm)
- Weight: 192 lb (87 kg; 13 st 10 lb)
- Position: Defence
- Shoots: Right
- NHL team (P) Cur. team Former teams: Philadelphia Flyers; Lehigh Valley Phantoms (AHL); Malmö Redhawks
- NHL draft: 35th overall, 2020; Los Angeles Kings
- Playing career: 2019–present

Helge Grans (born 10 May 2002) is a Swedish professional ice hockey defenceman for the Lehigh Valley Phantoms of the American Hockey League (AHL) while under contract to the Philadelphia Flyers of the National Hockey League (NHL). Grans was drafted 35th overall by the Kings in the 2020 NHL entry draft.

== Playing career ==
Grans was the most effective defenceman of the IF Troja-Ljungby U16 Juniors in 2016–17, scoring 12 points. In the 2017–18 season, he was the team's best scorer at U16 level, with 26 points. In the middle of the 2017–18 season, he moved to the Malmö Redhawks.

At only 16 years old Grans played his first men's league match with the Malmö Redhawks in the Champions Hockey League (CHL) on 16 October 2018 against the EHC Red Bull München. Grans scored his first Swedish Hockey League (SHL) goal on 30 December 2019 against Brynäs IF.

On 4 June 2021, Grans was signed by the Los Angeles Kings to a three-year, entry-level contract.

On 6 June 2023, the Kings traded Grans to the Philadelphia Flyers as part of a three-team trade also involving the Columbus Blue Jackets.

On 18 November 2024, Grans was called up from the Lehigh Valley Phantoms and made his NHL debut against the Colorado Avalanche.

On 29 September 2025, the Philadelphia Flyers waived Grans during training camp.

Medal record

Representing Sweden

Ice hockey

World Junior Championships
Bronze medal – third place	2022 Canada	

== Career statistics ==
=== Regular season and playoffs ===
			Regular season					Playoffs
Season	Team	League	GP	G	A	Pts	PIM	GP	G	A	Pts	PIM
2018–19	Malmö Redhawks	J20	34	5	12	17	12	2	0	0	0	0
2018–19	Malmö Redhawks	SHL	5	0	0	0	0	—	—	—	—	—
2019–20	Malmö Redhawks	J20	27	4	23	27	10	—	—	—	—	—
2019–20	Malmö Redhawks	SHL	21	1	2	3	4	—	—	—	—	—
2020–21	Malmö Redhawks	SHL	43	3	9	12	0	—	—	—	—	—
2021–22	Ontario Reign	AHL	56	7	17	24	8	5	0	0	0	2
2022–23	Ontario Reign	AHL	59	2	7	9	22	—	—	—	—	—
2023–24	Lehigh Valley Phantoms	AHL	56	1	7	8	24	4	0	1	1	0
2024–25	Lehigh Valley Phantoms	AHL	66	8	15	23	42	7	1	3	4	4
2024–25	Philadelphia Flyers	NHL	6	0	1	1	2	—	—	—	—	—
2025–26	Lehigh Valley Phantoms	AHL	61	3	11	14	29	—	—	—	—	—
SHL totals			69	4	11	15	4	—	—	—	—	—
NHL totals			6	0	1	1	2	—	—	—	—	—

=== International ===
Year	Team	Event	Result	GP	G	A	Pts	PIM
2018	Sweden	U17	3rd place, bronze medalist(s)	6	0	2	2	0
2019	Sweden	HG18	3rd place, bronze medalist(s)	5	0	1	1	2
2022	Sweden	WJC	3rd place, bronze medalist(s)	7	0	4	4	6
Junior totals				18	0	7	7	8
