= Kasper Simontaival =

Finnish ice hockey player (born 2002)

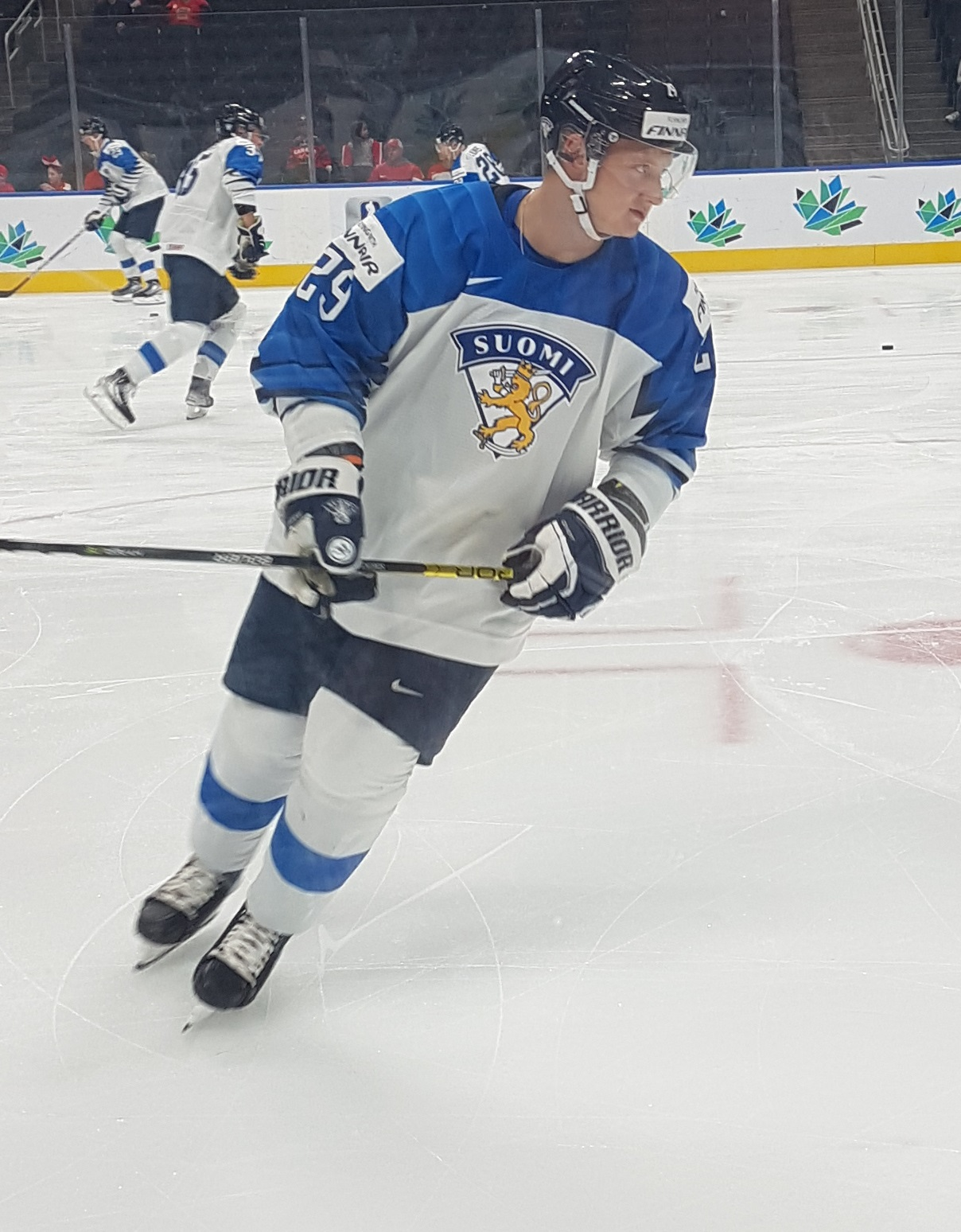
- Simontaival at the 2022 World Junior Ice Hockey Championships
- Born: 11 January 2002 (age 24) Tampere, Finland
- Height: 5 ft 9 in (175 cm)
- Weight: 176 lb (80 kg; 12 st 8 lb)
- Position: Forward
- Shoots: Right
- Liiga team Former teams: KalPa; Tappara; Lukko
- NHL draft: 66th overall, 2020; Los Angeles Kings
- Playing career: 2018–present

Kasper Simontaival (born 11 January 2002) is a Finnish professional ice hockey player who is currently playing for Tappara in the Liiga. He was drafted 66th overall by the Los Angeles Kings in the 2020 NHL entry draft.

== Career statistics ==
Medal record

Ice hockey

Representing Finland

World Junior Championships
| Silver medal – second place | 2022 Canada | |
| Bronze medal – third place | 2021 Canada | |

=== International ===
| Year | Team | Event | Result | GP | G | A | Pts | PIM |
|---|---|---|---|---|---|---|---|---|
| 2021 | Finland | WJC | 3rd place, bronze medalist(s) | 7 | 4 | 3 | 7 | 2 |
| 2022 | Finland | WJC | 2nd place, silver medalist(s) | 7 | 3 | 4 | 7 | 2 |
| Junior totals | | | | 14 | 7 | 7 | 14 | 4 |
