= Oskar Olausson =

Swedish ice hockey player (born 2002)

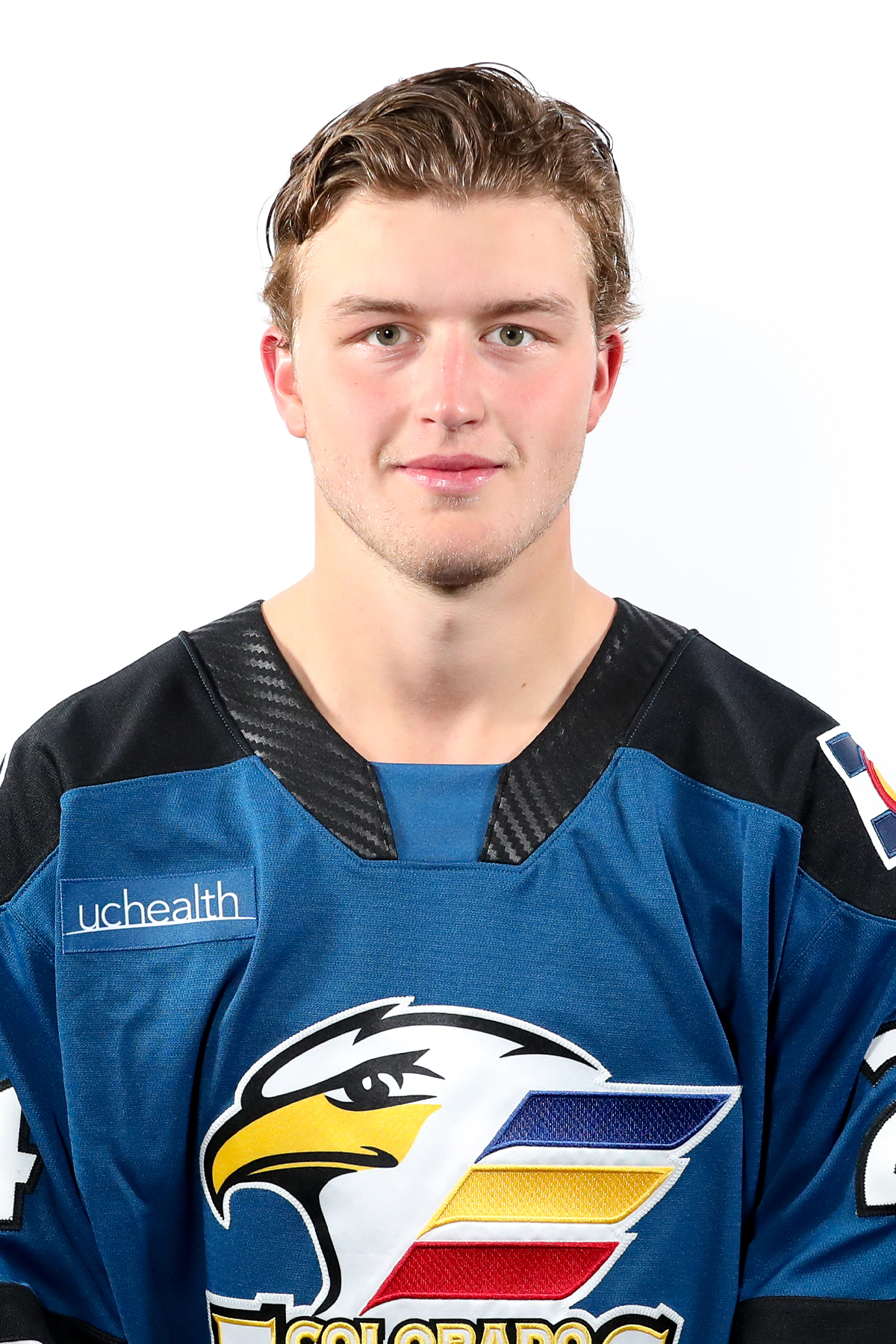
- Olausson in 2024 with the Colorado Eagles
- Born: 10 November 2002 (age 23) Stockholm, Sweden
- Height: 6 ft 1 in (185 cm)
- Weight: 181 lb (82 kg; 12 st 13 lb)
- Position: Winger
- Shoots: Left
- SHL team Former teams: Frölunda HC; HV71; Colorado Avalanche
- NHL draft: 28th overall, 2021; Colorado Avalanche
- Playing career: 2020–present

Oskar Olausson (born 10 November 2002) is a Swedish professional ice hockey winger for the Frölunda HC of the Swedish Hockey League (SHL). Olausson was drafted in the first round, 28th overall, by the Colorado Avalanche in the 2021 NHL entry draft.

== Playing career ==
Olausson played as a youth with Tranås AIF before moving to continue his junior development with HV71. Entering his third season in the J20 Nationell, Olausson began the 2020–21 season at J20 level, he collected 14 goals and 27 points in 16 games before joining the senior team. He made his professional debut with HV71 in the Swedish Hockey League (SHL), recording 3 goals and 4 points in 16 regular season games before concluding the season on loan in the HockeyAllsvenskan with second tier club, Södertälje SK contributing with 6 points in 11 outings.

After his selection to the Avalanche in the first round, 28th overall, in the 2021 NHL entry draft, Olausson was originally slated to return to newly relegated HV71 of the Allsvenskan. However, on 7 August 2021, Olausson was signed by the Avalanche to a three-year, entry-level contract in order to continue his development in North America. With his previous selection of his junior rights in the CHL Import Draft going to the Barrie Colts, 118th overall, Olausson agreed to terms with the club, giving a commitment on 20 August 2021.

In the 2021–22 season, Olausson quickly adapted to the North American size rink, scoring 12 goals and 25 points through 22 games with the Colts. While leading the club in goals, Olausson was traded by the Colts to fellow divisional club the Oshawa Generals, in exchange for Kevin Niedenz and multiple draft selections on 6 January 2022. Olausson continued in a top-line scoring role, adding 14 goals and 24 points through 33 regular season games with the Generals. Following a first-round exit in the post-season, Olausson was reassigned by the Avalanche to join primary affiliate, the Colorado Eagles of the AHL, for the playoffs on 2 May 2022. Olausson made four appearances with the Eagles through the post-season, finishing with 2 assists.

Following training camp and pre-season in preparation for the 2022–23 season, Olausson was reassigned to continue his development with the Colorado Eagles in the AHL. He notched his first professional goal in North America, collecting the game-winning goal in a 6–2 win over the Calgary Wranglers on 21 October 2022. After posting 8 points through 16 games for the Eagles and with the Avalanche dealing with a glut of injuries, Olausson received his first NHL recall on 23 November 2022. Initially placed on the Avalanche's second-line, Olausson made his NHL debut that night at Ball Arena in a 4–3 defeat to the Vancouver Canucks. Following the game, Olausson was reassigned to the AHL to continue his tenure with the Eagles.

On 25 July 2025, Olausson was traded by the Avalanche to the San Jose Sharks in exchange for right winger Danil Gushchin. After attending the Sharks training camp, Olausson was assigned to AHL affiliate, the San Jose Barracuda. Before making an appearance in the 2025–26 season with the Barracuda, Olausson was traded by the Sharks to the Minnesota Wild in exchange for prospect Kyle Masters on 17 October 2025.

At the conclusion of his contract with the Wild, Olausson returned to his native Sweden, signing a two-year contract with Frölunda HC of the SHL, on 11 May 2026.

== Career statistics ==
=== Regular season and playoffs ===
			Regular season					Playoffs
Season	Team	League	GP	G	A	Pts	PIM	GP	G	A	Pts	PIM
2018–19	HV71	J20	11	1	3	4	2	—	—	—	—	—
2019–20	HV71	J20	21	7	9	16	4	—	—	—	—	—
2020–21	HV71	J20	16	14	13	27	10	—	—	—	—	—
2020–21	HV71	SHL	16	3	1	4	4	2	0	0	0	0
2020–21	Södertälje SK	Allsv	11	3	3	6	0	2	0	0	0	0
2021–22	Barrie Colts	OHL	22	12	13	25	8	—	—	—	—	—
2021–22	Oshawa Generals	OHL	33	14	10	24	10	6	1	1	2	6
2021–22	Colorado Eagles	AHL	—	—	—	—	—	4	0	2	2	0
2022–23	Colorado Eagles	AHL	63	11	9	20	30	6	1	2	3	10
2022–23	Colorado Avalanche	NHL	1	0	0	0	0	—	—	—	—	—
2023–24	Colorado Eagles	AHL	39	11	9	20	24	—	—	—	—	—
2023–24	Colorado Avalanche	NHL	1	0	0	0	0	—	—	—	—	—
2024–25	Colorado Eagles	AHL	61	11	15	26	26	7	0	3	3	2
2024–25	Colorado Avalanche	NHL	2	0	0	0	0	—	—	—	—	—
2025–26	Iowa Wild	AHL	63	12	17	29	24	—	—	—	—	—
SHL totals			16	3	1	4	2	2	0	0	0	0
NHL totals			4	0	0	0	0	—	—	—	—	—

Medal record

Representing Sweden

Ice hockey

World Junior Championships
Bronze medal – third place	2022 Canada	

=== International ===
Year	Team	Event	Result	GP	G	A	Pts	PIM
2019	Sweden	HG18	3rd place, bronze medalist(s)	5	1	0	1	2
2021	Sweden	WJC	5th	4	0	0	0	0
2022	Sweden	WJC	3rd place, bronze medalist(s)	7	1	4	5	2
Junior totals				16	2	4	6	4

Awards and achievements
Preceded by Justin Barron	Colorado Avalanche first-round draft pick 2021	Succeeded by Calum Ritchie
