= Roni Hirvonen =

Finnish ice hockey player (born 2002)

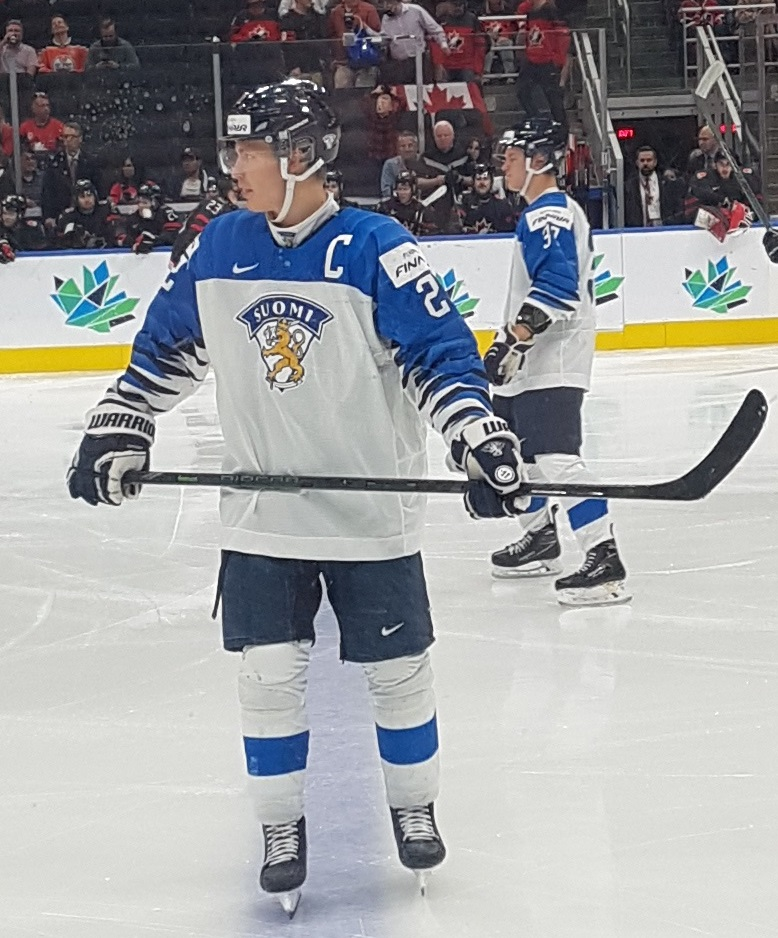
- Hirvonen at the 2022 World Junior Ice Hockey Championships
- Born: 10 January 2002 (age 24) Espoo, Finland
- Height: 5 ft 9 in (175 cm)
- Weight: 172 lb (78 kg; 12 st 4 lb)
- Position: Centre
- Shoots: Left
- Liiga team Former teams: Oulun Kärpät; Ässät; HIFK
- NHL draft: 59th overall, 2020; Toronto Maple Leafs
- Playing career: 2019–present

Roni Hirvonen (born 10 January 2002) is a Finnish professional ice hockey player who is currently playing for Oulun Kärpät in the Liiga. He was drafted 59th overall by the Toronto Maple Leafs in the 2020 NHL entry draft, ranking within the top ten of European skaters of the NHL Central Scouting Bureau.

== Playing career ==
=== Liiga ===
Hirvonen played in 152 career games in Liiga with HIFK and Ässät. In 2021–22, his third year in Liiga, Hirvonen posted 9 goals and 26 points through 46 games. He returned to Liiga for the 2022–23 season where he scored 15 goals and 28 points in 57 games.

=== North American career ===
Hirvonen was drafted by the Toronto Maple Leafs of the National Hockey League (NHL) in the second round, 59th overall, in the 2020 NHL entry draft. Hirvonen was signed to a three-year, entry-level contract with the Maple Leafs on 13 May 2022. On 7 July 2023 while attending the Maple Leafs development camp, he suffered a concussion when flattened by another prospect, former Sarnia Sting captain Nolan Dillingham-Morelli. He returned to action in September during a rookie tournament, playing alongside Dilligham-Morelli.

Hirvonen was invited to the Maple Leafs' 2023 training camp, but was assigned to their American Hockey League (AHL) affiliate, the Toronto Marlies, for the start of the 2023–24 season. In his second AHL game on 15 October 2023, Hirvonen suffered a serious eye injury after being struck by a stick. He returned to the team on 28 January 2024.

=== Return to Liiga ===
After his entry-level contract with the Maple Leafs, as a pending restricted free agent, Hirvonen opted to return to his native Finland and was signed to a one-year deal with Kärpät of the Liiga on 16 June 2025.

== International play ==
Hirvonen has played for Finland at several tournaments. He played for the team at the 2019 Hlinka Gretzky Cup, where he led the team in scoring, but Finland finished fourth. At the 2021 World Junior Championship, Hirvonen scored six points in seven games and Finland won the bronze. In his final tournament, he captained the team at the 2022 World Junior Championship, scoring seven points in seven games and taking the silver medal.

Medal record

Representing Finland

Ice hockey

World Junior Championships
Silver medal – second place	2022 Canada	
Bronze medal – third place	2021 Canada	

== Career statistics ==
=== Regular season and playoffs ===
			Regular season					Playoffs
Season	Team	League	GP	G	A	Pts	PIM	GP	G	A	Pts	PIM
2017–18	Blues	Jr. A	2	0	3	3	2	—	—	—	—	—
2018–19	Blues	Jr. A	50	21	34	55	34	11	3	12	15	16
2019–20	Ässät	Liiga	52	5	11	16	14	—	—	—	—	—
2020–21	Ässät	Liiga	54	6	15	21	54	—	—	—	—	—
2021–22	HIFK	Liiga	46	9	17	26	24	5	3	3	6	4
2022–23	HIFK	Liiga	57	15	13	28	32	11	2	2	4	0
2023–24	Toronto Marlies	AHL	37	7	6	13	8	3	0	0	0	0
2024–25	Toronto Marlies	AHL	59	10	11	21	26	1	0	1	1	0
Liiga totals			209	35	56	91	124	16	5	5	10	4

=== International ===
Year	Team	Event	GP	G	A	Pts	PIM
2018	Finland	U17	6	2	0	2	4
2019	Finland	U18	3	0	0	0	12
2019	Finland	HG18	3	4	1	5	4
2021	Finland	WJC	7	2	4	6	18
2022	Finland	WJC	7	3	4	7	0
Junior totals			26	11	9	20	38
