= Matias Rajaniemi =

Finnish ice hockey player

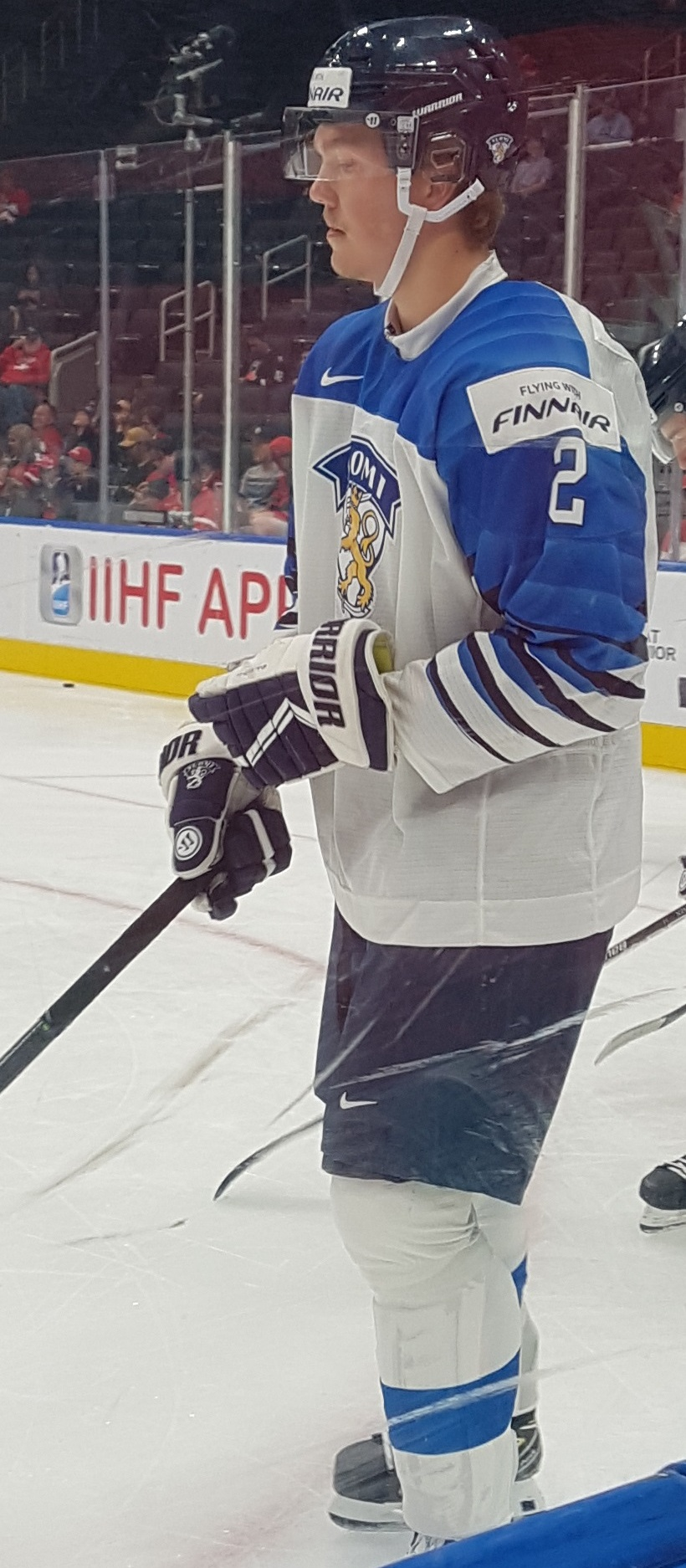
- Rajaniemi on 2022.08.15
- Born: 11 September 2002 (age 24) Lahti, Finland
- Height: 6 ft 4 in (193 cm)
- Weight: 205 lb (93 kg; 14 st 9 lb)
- Position: Defence
- Shoots: Left
- Mestis team Former teams: Jokerit; Lahti Pelicans; SaiPa; Bridgeport Islanders; HIFK Hockey
- NHL draft: 183rd overall, 2020; New York Islanders
- Playing career: 2020–present

Matias Rajaniemi (born 11 September 2002) is a Finnish professional ice hockey defenceman who plays for Jokerit of Mestis. Rajaniemi was drafted in the sixth round of the 2020 NHL entry draft by the New York Islanders with the 183rd overall pick.

== Playing career ==
Rajaniemi played as a youth within the Lahti Pelicans organization before making his professional debut in the Liiga with the Pelicans during the 2019–20 season. He registered 2 assists through 12 games.

During his fourth season with the Pelicans, having featured in 6 games, Rajaniemi left the club to sign a two-year contract and immediately join SaiPa of the Liiga on 22 November 2022.

At the conclusion of his contract with SaiPa, Rajaniemi joined the New York Islanders' American Hockey League (AHL) affiliate, the Bridgeport Islanders, on an initial ATO for the remainder of the 2023–24 season while signing a one-year contract for the following season on March 26, 2024.

== Career statistics ==
=== Regular season and playoffs ===
			Regular season					Playoffs
Season	Team	League	GP	G	A	Pts	PIM	GP	G	A	Pts	PIM
2018–19	Lahti Pelicans	Jr. A	34	2	3	5	16	8	0	1	1	2
2019–20	Lahti Pelicans	Jr. A	39	2	15	17	24	1	0	0	0	0
2019–20	Lahti Pelicans	Liiga	12	0	2	2	0	—	—	—	—	—
2019–20	Peliitat	Mestis	2	0	0	0	2	—	—	—	—	—
2020–21	Lahti Pelicans	Liiga	46	3	6	9	20	3	1	0	1	0
2021–22	Lahti Pelicans	Liiga	58	1	6	7	24	—	—	—	—	—
2022–23	Lahti Pelicans	Liiga	6	0	2	2	6	—	—	—	—	—
2022–23	SaiPa	Liiga	25	0	2	2	6	—	—	—	—	—
2023–24	SaiPa	Liiga	53	0	8	8	18	—	—	—	—	—
2024–25	Worcester Railers	ECHL	61	5	5	10	18	—	—	—	—	—
2024–25	Bridgeport Islanders	AHL	4	0	0	0	0	—	—	—	—	—
Liiga totals			200	4	26	30	74	3	1	0	1	0

Medal record

Ice hockey

Representing Finland

World Junior Championships
Silver medal – second place	2022 Canada	
Bronze medal – third place	2021 Canada	

=== International ===
Year	Team	Event	Result	GP	G	A	Pts	PIM
2021	Finland	WJC	3rd place, bronze medalist(s)	6	0	0	0	0
2022	Finland	WJC	2nd place, silver medalist(s)	6	0	1	1	0
Junior totals				12	0	1	1	0
