= William Wallinder =

Swedish ice hockey player (born 2002)

- Born: 28 July 2002 (age 24) Sollefteå, Sweden
- Height: 6 ft 4 in (193 cm)
- Weight: 192 lb (87 kg; 13 st 10 lb)
- Position: Defence
- Shoots: Left
- NHL team Former teams: Detroit Red Wings; Rögle BK
- NHL draft: 32nd overall, 2020; Detroit Red Wings
- Playing career: 2019–present

William Wallinder (born 28 July 2002) is a Swedish professional ice hockey player who is a defenceman for the Detroit Red Wings of the National Hockey League (NHL). He was selected 32nd overall by the Red Wings in the 2020 NHL entry draft.

== Playing career ==
After four seasons within the Modo Hockey organization, Wallinder left the HockeyAllsvenskan club to sign a two-year contract with top-tier club, Rögle BK of the Swedish Hockey League (SHL) on 20 May 2021.

In the 2022–23 season with Rögle BK, Wallinder amassed 7 goals and 26 points to co-lead the SHL in scoring amongst skaters aged 22 years or younger. On 27 March 2023, Wallinder was signed to a three-year, entry-level contract with the Detroit Red Wings commencing in the following 2023–24 season. He immediately joined Detroit's American Hockey League (AHL) affiliate, the Grand Rapids Griffins, on an amateur tryout for the remainder of the season.

During the 2025–26 season, he recorded two goals and 18 assists in 66 regular season games and one goal in eight games during the 2026 Calder Cup playoffs.

On 25 June 2026, he signed a two-year, two-way contract with the Red Wings. On 6 October, Wallinder made his NHL debut and recorded an assist in a 5–3 win over the Ottawa Senators.

== International play ==
Medal record

Men's ice hockey

Representing Sweden

World Junior Championships
Bronze medal – third place	2022 Canada	

Hlinka Gretzky Cup
Bronze medal – third place	2019 Czech Republic/Slovakia	

Wallinder represented Sweden junior team at the 2022 World Junior Championships and won a bronze medal.

== Career statistics ==
=== Regular season and playoffs ===
			Regular season					Playoffs
Season	Team	League	GP	G	A	Pts	PIM	GP	G	A	Pts	PIM
2017–18	Sollefteå HK	Div.1	7	0	0	0	0	—	—	—	—	—
2018–19	Modo Hockey	J20	2	0	1	1	2	—	—	—	—	—
2019–20	Modo Hockey	J20	37	5	19	24	16	—	—	—	—	—
2019–20	Modo Hockey	Allsv	18	0	2	2	2	—	—	—	—	—
2020–21	Modo Hockey	J20	4	2	4	6	2	—	—	—	—	—
2020–21	Modo Hockey	Allsv	43	1	5	6	14	—	—	—	—	—
2021–22	Rögle BK	J20	7	1	3	4	2	—	—	—	—	—
2021–22	Rögle BK	SHL	47	4	15	19	6	13	1	0	1	0
2022–23	Rögle BK	SHL	50	7	19	26	10	9	1	2	3	0
2022–23	Grand Rapids Griffins	AHL	1	0	0	0	0	—	—	—	—	—
2023–24	Grand Rapids Griffins	AHL	65	3	12	15	10	9	1	2	3	0
2024–25	Grand Rapids Griffins	AHL	62	2	17	19	10	3	0	0	0	0
2025–26	Grand Rapids Griffins	AHL	66	2	18	20	23	8	1	0	1	2
SHL totals			97	11	34	45	16	22	2	2	4	0

=== International ===
Year	Team	Event	Result	GP	G	A	Pts	PIM
2019	Sweden	HG18	3rd place, bronze medalist(s)	5	0	0	0	0
2022	Sweden	WJC	3rd place, bronze medalist(s)	7	0	3	3	0
Junior totals				12	0	3	3	0
