= Joakim Kemell =

Finnish ice hockey player (born 2004)

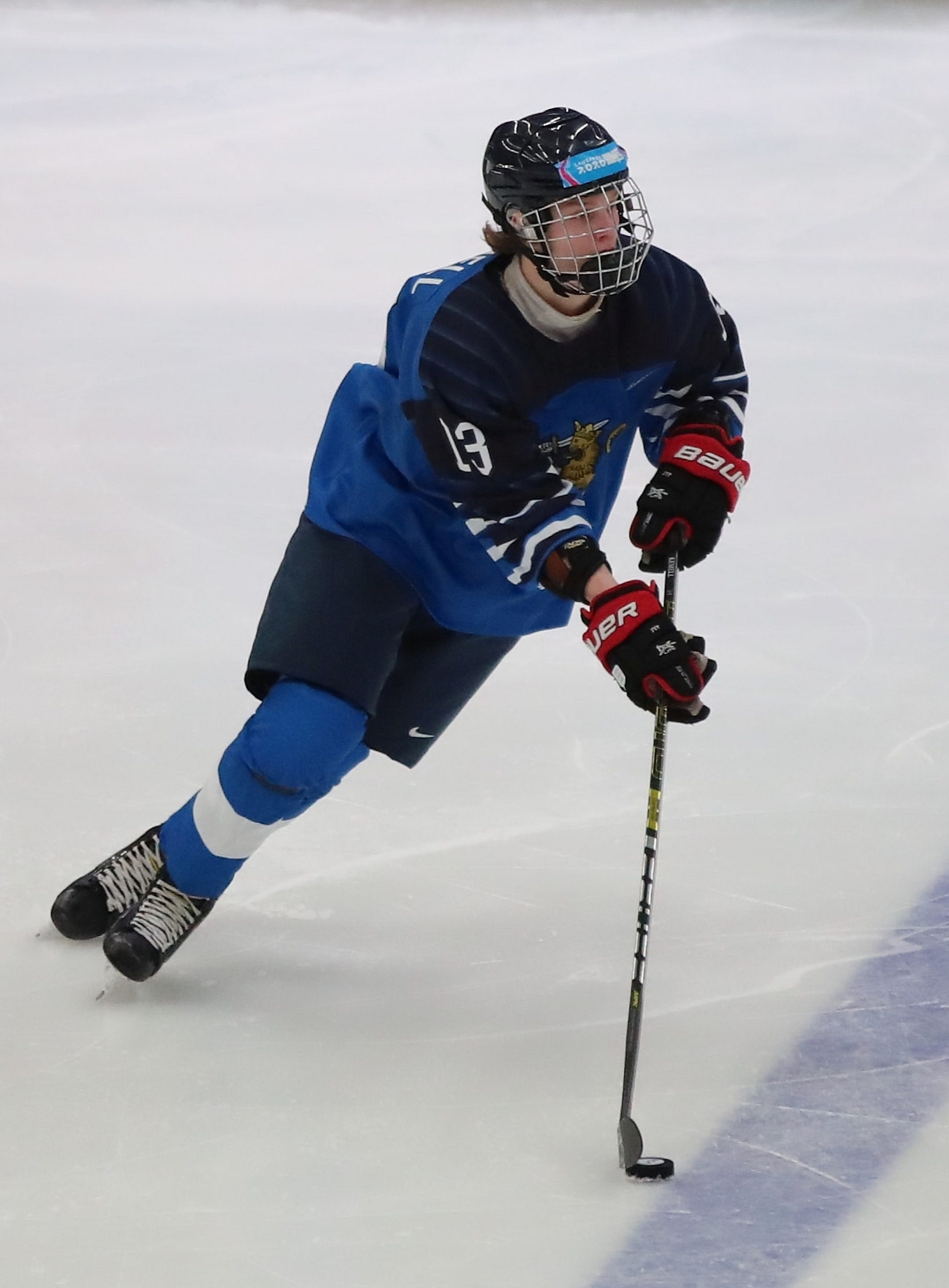
- Kemell at the 2020 Winter Youth Olympics
- Born: 27 April 2004 (age 22) Jyväskylän maalaiskunta, Finland
- Height: 5 ft 11 in (180 cm)
- Weight: 182 lb (83 kg; 13 st 0 lb)
- Position: Right wing
- Shoots: Right
- NHL team (P) Cur. team Former teams: Nashville Predators; Milwaukee Admirals (AHL); JYP Jyväskylä
- NHL draft: 17th overall, 2022; Nashville Predators
- Playing career: 2021–present

Joakim Kemell (born 27 April 2004) is a Finnish professional ice hockey forward who is currently playing with the Milwaukee Admirals in the American Hockey League (AHL) as a prospect to the Nashville Predators of the National Hockey League (NHL). He was touted as one of the top Finnish prospects, and was drafted 17th overall by the Predators in 2022 NHL entry draft.

== Playing career ==
Kemell scored 15 goals and 23 points through 39 regular season games, playing in his first full year with JYP Jyväskylä in the Liiga of the 2021–22 season. At the conclusion of the season, Kemell won the Jarmo Wasama Memorial Trophy as Finish Liiga's Rookie of the Year.

Following his selection at the 2022 NHL entry draft, Kemell was signed to a three-year, entry-level contract with the Nashville Predators on 15 July 2022. He was returned on loan by the Predators to continue his development in Finland with JYP Jyväskylä for the 2022–23 season.

== International play ==
Medal record

Representing Finland

Ice hockey

World Junior Championships
Silver medal – second place	2022 Canada	

IIHF World U18 Championship
Bronze medal – third place	2022 Germany	

Kemell represented Finland at the 2022 IIHF World U18 Championships, where he recorded six goals and two assists and won a bronze medal.

== Career statistics ==
=== Regular season and playoffs ===
			Regular season					Playoffs
Season	Team	League	GP	G	A	Pts	PIM	GP	G	A	Pts	PIM
2020–21	JYP Jyväskylä	U20	38	22	14	36	51	3	0	0	0	0
2020–21	JYP Jyväskylä	Liiga	1	1	0	1	0	—	—	—	—	—
2021–22	JYP Jyväskylä	Liiga	39	15	8	23	2	—	—	—	—	—
2022–23	JYP Jyväskylä	Liiga	43	12	3	15	14	—	—	—	—	—
2022–23	Milwaukee Admirals	AHL	14	6	7	13	21	14	8	2	10	2
2023–24	Milwaukee Admirals	AHL	67	16	25	41	23	15	3	8	11	6
2024–25	Milwaukee Admirals	AHL	65	19	21	40	39	10	3	5	8	16
2024–25	Nashville Predators	NHL	2	0	0	0	0	—	—	—	—	—
2025–26	Nashville Predators	NHL	16	1	2	3	0	—	—	—	—	—
2025–26	Milwaukee Admirals	AHL	48	10	19	29	56	3	0	0	0	2
Liiga totals			83	28	11	39	16	—	—	—	—	—
NHL totals			18	1	2	3	0	—	—	—	—	—

=== International ===
Year	Team	Event	Result	GP	G	A	Pts	PIM
2021	Finland	U18	4th	7	3	0	3	2
2021	Finland	HG18	4th	5	5	1	6	6
2022	Finland	U18	3rd place, bronze medalist(s)	5	6	2	8	6
2022	Finland	WJC	2nd place, silver medalist(s)	7	4	8	12	0
2023	Finland	WJC	5th	5	2	2	4	0
Junior totals				29	20	13	33	14

== Awards and honors ==
Award	Year
Liiga
Jarmo Wasama Memorial Trophy	2022

Awards and achievements
Preceded by Zachary L'Heureux	Nashville Predators first-round draft pick 2022	Succeeded by Matthew Wood
