= Riley Duran =

American ice hockey player (born 2002)

- Born: January 25, 2002 (age 24) Boston, Massachusetts, United States
- Height: 6 ft 1 in (185 cm)
- Weight: 198 lb (90 kg; 14 st 2 lb)
- Position: Center
- Shoots: Right
- NHL team (P) Cur. team: Boston Bruins; Providence Bruins (AHL)
- NHL draft: 182nd overall, 2020; Boston Bruins
- Playing career: 2024–present

Riley Duran (born January 25, 2002) is an American professional ice hockey center for the Providence Bruins in the American Hockey League (AHL) as a prospect to the Boston Bruins of the National Hockey League (NHL). He was selected 182nd overall by the Bruins in the 2020 NHL entry draft.

== Early life ==
Duran was born on January 25, 2002, in Boston, Massachusetts, to parents Jim Duran and Lori McLaren Duran. He grew up in an athletic household as his mother, father, and older sister played collegiate sports. While growing up in Woburn, Duran played minor hockey alongside New York Rangers forward Brett Berard.

== Playing career ==
Duran played high school hockey for Woburn Memorial High School, Malden Catholic High School, and Lawrence Academy. During his freshman season at Woburn, Duran played hockey under his father's tutelage before transferring to Malden Catholic. He played his sophomore season at Malden before finishing his junior and senior seasons at Lawrence. During the 2019–20 season, Duran split his time playing for both Lawrence Academy and the Cape Cod Whalers 18U AAA team. He was named the Independent School League MVP and earned attention from Boston Bruins scouts. He finished the season ranked 95th among all North American skaters by the NHL Central Scouting Bureau and was eventually drafted by the Bruins in the sixth round of the 2020 NHL entry draft. Duran spent the 2020–21 season with the Youngstown Phantoms of the United States Hockey League before starting his freshman season at Providence College.

=== Professional ===
Duran concluded his collegiate career on March 24, 2024, by signing a two-year entry-level contract with the Bruins. Following the signing, he reported to their American Hockey League (AHL) affiliate, the Providence Bruins, on an amateur tryout contract for the remainder of the 2023–24 season. Duran made his professional debut on March 26, 2024, and scored his first AHL goal six games later. After participating in the Boston Bruins' 2024 training camp, Duran was reassigned to the AHL for the 2024–25 season. He spent the majority of the season in Providence before being recalled to the NHL level on April 10, 2025, on an emegrency basis. He made his NHL debut that night against the Chicago Blackhawks and skated 13 minutes and 36 seconds.

On July 10, 2026, as a restricted free agent, Duran was signed to a one-year, two-way contract extension with the Bruins for the 2026–27 season.

== International play ==
Duran represented the United States at the 2022 World Junior Ice Hockey Championships.

== Career statistics ==
=== Regular season and playoffs ===
			Regular season					Playoffs
Season	Team	League	GP	G	A	Pts	PIM	GP	G	A	Pts	PIM
2018–19	Youngstown Phantoms	USHL	1	0	0	0	2	—	—	—	—	—
2018–19	Lawrence Academy	USHS-MA	28	9	17	26	28	—	—	—	—	—
2019–20	Lawrence Academy	USHS-MA	27	22	22	44	–	–	–	–	–	–
2020–21	Youngstown Phantoms	USHL	47	8	11	19	32	—	—	—	—	—
2021–22	Providence College	HE	38	10	9	19	18	—	—	—	—	—
2022–23	Providence College	HE	29	8	12	20	33	–	–	–	–	–
2023–24	Providence College	HE	35	9	7	16	18	–	–	–	–	–
2023–24	Providence Bruins	AHL	11	2	2	4	2	4	0	0	0	0
2024–25	Providence Bruins	AHL	60	12	4	16	12	8	0	2	2	0
2024–25	Boston Bruins	NHL	2	0	0	0	2	—	—	—	—	—
2025–26	Providence Bruins	AHL	72	7	12	19	22	4	0	0	0	2
NHL totals			2	0	0	0	2	—	—	—	—	—

=== International ===
Year	Team	Event	Result	GP	G	A	Pts	PIM
2022	United States	WJC	5th	5	2	3	5	2
Junior totals				5	2	3	5	2
