= Oskar Magnusson =

Swedish ice hockey player

- Born: 31 January 2002 (age 24) Trelleborg, Sweden
- Height: 5 ft 10 in (178 cm)
- Weight: 165 lb (75 kg; 11 st 11 lb)
- Position: Forward
- Shoots: Left
- Allsv team Former teams: AIK; Malmö Redhawks
- NHL draft: 211th overall, 2020; Washington Capitals
- Playing career: 2020–present

Oskar Magnusson is a Swedish professional ice hockey forward who plays for AIK in HockeyAllsvenskan. He was drafted by the Washington Capitals in the 7th round of the 2020 NHL entry draft with the 211th overall pick.

== Career statistics ==
=== Regular season and playoffs ===
			Regular season					Playoffs
Season	Team	League	GP	G	A	Pts	PIM	GP	G	A	Pts	PIM
2018–19	Malmö Redhawks	J20	35	8	11	19	28	2	0	0	0	0
2019–20	Malmö Redhawks	J20	38	22	26	48	40	—	—	—	—	—
2019–20	Malmö Redhawks	SHL	4	0	0	0	0	—	—	—	—	—
2020–21	Malmö Redhawks	J20	12	3	6	9	6	—	—	—	—	—
2020–21	Malmö Redhawks	SHL	8	0	0	0	0	2	0	0	0	0
2020–21	Tyringe SoSS	Div.1	24	6	7	13	8	—	—	—	—	—
2021–22	AIK IF	Allsv	41	5	6	11	8	2	0	0	0	2
2021–22	AIK IF	J20	1	0	1	1	0	6	3	2	5	2
2022–23	AIK IF	Allsv	52	6	10	16	16	6	0	0	0	2
2023–24	AIK IF	Allsv	41	2	7	9	12	4	0	4	4	49
2024–25	AIK IF	Allsv	52	10	13	23	18	14	0	1	1	0
SHL totals			12	0	0	0	0	2	0	0	0	0

Medal record

Representing Sweden

Ice hockey

World Junior Championships
Bronze medal – third place	2022 Canada	

=== International ===
Year	Team	Event	Result	GP	G	A	Pts	PIM
2018	Sweden	U17	3rd place, bronze medalist(s)	6	0	1	1	0
2019	Sweden	U18	3rd place, bronze medalist(s)	5	0	0	0	4
2022	Sweden	WJC	3rd place, bronze medalist(s)	7	1	1	2	0
Junior totals				18	1	2	3	4
