= 2022 World Junior Ice Hockey Championships =

2022 edition of the World Junior Ice Hockey Championships

2022 IIHF World Junior Championships

Tournament details
- Host country: Canada
- Venue: Rogers Place (in 1 host city)
- Dates: August 9–20, 2022
- Teams: 10

Final positions
- Champions: Canada (19th title)
- Runners-up: Finland
- Third place: Sweden
- Fourth place: Czechia

Tournament statistics
- Games played: 28
- Goals scored: 182 (6.5 per game)
- Attendance: 55,686 (1,989 per game)
- Scoring leader: (Canada) Mason McTavish (17 points)

Awards
- MVP: (Canada) Mason McTavish

The 2022 World Junior Ice Hockey Championships (2022 WJHC) was the 46th edition of the Ice Hockey World Junior Championship, held from 9 to 20 August 2022 at Rogers Place in Edmonton, Alberta, Canada.

The tournament was originally scheduled to be held from 26 December 2021 through 5 January 2022, in Edmonton and Red Deer — the host cities originally awarded the 2021 tournament before it was moved into a "bubble" behind closed doors competition in Edmonton due to the COVID-19 pandemic. During the tournament, multiple teams reported COVID-19 outbreaks. Consequently, the IIHF decided on 29 December 2021 to cancel the tournament. In February 2022, it was announced that the tournament would be replayed from scratch at a later date, while all results and statistics from December games would be annulled. The official tournament (the August edition) was, once again, hosted exclusively by the city of Edmonton.

This marked the 17th time that Canada hosted the WJIHC. Due to the Russian invasion of Ukraine, Russia was suspended from international ice hockey and replaced by Latvia (which was promoted to the tournament's top division after finishing second in the Division I-A tournament in December 2021). The country notably achieved its first-ever victory in a preliminary game. In the gold medal game, Canada beat Finland 3–2 in overtime to win its 19th tournament title.

== Background ==
=== Preparations ===
On March 14, 2019, it was announced that Gothenburg would be the host city. It was to be the first time that Gothenburg has hosted the tournament (having previously hosted the Senior Ice Hockey World Championships twice in 1981 and 2002), and the seventh time that Sweden had hosted the tournament.

On September 17, 2020, the IIHF announced that the 2022 tournament would instead be hosted by Edmonton and Red Deer, Alberta as compensation for the 2021 tournament (which was originally to be hosted by both cities) being held behind closed doors exclusively in Edmonton due to the COVID-19 pandemic. It became the 15th time that Canada has hosted the tournament, the fourth time Edmonton has hosted the tournament, and the second time games have been hosted in Red Deer, following the 1995 edition. Gothenburg was re-assigned the 2024 tournament.

On December 18, 2021, citing the "changing epidemiological situation" involving COVID-19 and Omicron variant, and consultation with the IIHF and Alberta Health Services, Hockey Canada announced that the schedule of pre-tournament games (which was to feature each team playing at least two exhibition games) would be reduced, and moved to December 23. Organizers stated that their goal was to hold a "safe and successful event," and that 90% of tickets had been sold. There were no stated plans to reduce spectator capacity.

As a participant in the provincial "Restrictions Exemption Program" (REP), Rogers Place could operate at full capacity under Alberta provincial public health orders, but was required to enforce proof of COVID-19 vaccinations. On December 21, as part of public health orders to control Omicron variant, the Alberta government ordered all large venues participating in REP to restrict their capacity to 50% effective December 24. Food and drink consumption was prohibited when seated and during intermissions.

=== Cancellation and rescheduling of tournament due to COVID-19 ===
Teams were required to quarantine if any one member tested positive for COVID-19, resulting in three games being forfeited by December 29. Citing the health and safety of participants, and that the competitive integrity of the tournament had been compromised by the aforementioned forfeits, the IIHF announced that the remainder of the tournament had been abandoned. However, IIHF president Luc Tardif stated during a press conference that a committee would meet in January to discuss the feasibility of resuming the tournament at a later date, and that "we want to take the next month to think about it and maybe come with a good surprise."

On February 17, 2022, Tardif announced that the tournament would be rescheduled to mid-August 2022, following the U18 Hlinka Gretzky Cup. The tournament would be replayed from the beginning, with all results and statistics from the first attempt thrown out. Rosters from the first playing of the tournament were grandfathered. The following month, it was announced that the tournament replay had been scheduled for August 9–20, 2022, and that it would be hosted exclusively by Edmonton for the second year in a row. Those who had purchased tickets for the first running of the 2022 tournament, or the 2021 tournament, were given priority access to tickets. With Edmonton focusing on the rescheduled tournament, the 2022 Hlinka Gretzky Cup was hosted exclusively by Red Deer.

In condemnation of the Russian invasion of Ukraine, Russia was suspended from international ice hockey by the IIHF. It was announced that Latvia—who were promoted to the top division for 2023 after finishing second in the Division I-A tournament—would replace Russia for the tournament replay. Division I-A winner Belarus was also banned from international ice hockey for their support of the invasion.

=== Sponsorship withdrawals and low attendance ===
Due to the Hockey Canada sexual assault scandal that emerged in June 2022, a number of major entities suspended their sponsorships and support of Hockey Canada, including BDO, Canadian Tire, Imperial Oil, Recipe Unlimited, Scotiabank, Telus, and Tim Hortons. The city of Edmonton withdrew their marketing for the tournament. Sportsnet writer Paul D. Grant suggested that sponsors may had also been given the option to receive refunds on sponsorship purchases they had made for the December 2021 running of the tournament after it was cancelled. Besides a placement for IIHF global sponsor Tissot, there were no in-arena sponsor placements during the tournament, with the boards otherwise containing only images of the tournament emblem and ads for the IIHF's official mobile app.

On the eve of the tournament, it was also reported that "thousands" of tickets were still unsold, including tickets for games involving Canada—which had typically been a major draw during editions of the tournament hosted by Canada. The summer scheduling of the tournament, high ticket prices, the Hockey Canada scandals, and the removal of Russia, were cited by the press as potential factors. The first day of the tournament saw minuscule crowds, with its first three games having an announced attendance of 430, 376, and 829 respectively. However, this was based on tickets sold, and the actual number of spectators in attendance was believed to be much lower. Canada's games had moderate levels of attendance, ranging from 2,779 for its first preliminary game, to 5,204 for its final preliminary game—a fraction of Rogers Place's hockey capacity of 18,500. The gold medal game had an official attendance of 13,327.

=== Group A (December 2021) ===
Group A results (annulled)

Pos	Team	Pld	W	OTW	OTL	L	GF	GA	GD	Pts	Qualification
1	Finland	3	3	0	0	0	11	2	+9	9	Advance to Quarterfinals
2	Canada (H)	2	2	0	0	0	17	5	+12	6	Advance to Quarterfinals
3	Germany	2	0	1	0	1	3	4	−1	2	Advance to Quarterfinals
4	Czechia	3	0	0	1	2	4	9	−5	1	Advance to Quarterfinals
5	Austria	2	0	0	0	2	3	18	−15	0	

Updated to match(es) played on December 28, 2021. Source: IIHF
(H) Host

December 26, 2021; 12:00	Finland	3–1 (1–0, 1–1, 1–0)	Germany	Rogers Place, Edmonton; Attendance: 1,793

Game reference

Leevi Meriläinen
Goalies
Nikita Quapp
Referees:
(Canada) Adam Bloski
(Sweden) Andreas Harnebring
Linesmen:
(Canada) Brett Mackey
(Czech Republic) Josef Špůr

Helenius (Lambert) – 12:52	1–0
	1–1	23:27 – Münzenberger (PP)
Määttä (Heimosalmi, Hirvonen) – 27:38	2–1
Helenius (Lambert, Koivunen) – 47:53	3–1

8 min
Penalties
8 min
22
Shots
24

December 26, 2021; 17:00	Czechia	3–6 (3–3, 0–2, 0–1)	Canada	Rogers Place, Edmonton; Attendance: 4,526

Game reference

Jakub Málek
Goalies
Dylan Garand
Referees:
(Finland) Riku Brander
(Germany) Marc Iwert
Linesmen:
(United States) Nick Briganti
(Russia) Roman Slavikovskii

	0–1	04:00 – McTavish
Gut (Brabenec, Kulich) – 07:42	1–1
Novák (Jiříček, Ivan) (PP) – 11:32	2–1
Svozil (Gut) – 12:23	3–1
	3–2	12:46 – Power
	3–3	19:31 – Sebrango (Perfetti, Bedard)
	3–4	28:50 – Power (Perfetti, Bourque) (PP2)
	3–5	30:15 – Power (McTavish, Perfetti) (PP2)
	3–6	53:22 – Zellweger (Cormier, Neighbours) (PP)

8 min
Penalties
4 min
17
Shots
36

December 27, 2021; 12:00	Austria	1–7 (0–2, 1–2, 0–3)	Finland	Rogers Place, Edmonton; Attendance: 1,901

Game reference

Sebastian Wraneschitz
Goalies
Juha Jatkola
Referees:
(United States) Robert Hennessey
(Canada) Morgan MacPhee
Linesmen:
(Finland) Tommi Niittylä
(United States) John Rey

	0–1	03:29 – Koivunen (Lambert, Helenius)
	0–2	18:02 – Helenius (Koivunen)
	0–3	24:11 – Simontaival (Määttä, Aho)
Urbanek (Auer, Thaler) (PP) – 25:39	1–3
	1–4	26:34 – Väisänen (Aho, Päivärinta)
	1–5	48:40 – Koivunen (Lambert, Heimosalmi)
	1–6	50:25 – Niemelä (Määttä, Nurmi)
	1–7	54:13 – Lambert

4 min
Penalties
10 min
9
Shots
48

December 27, 2021; 17:00	Germany	2–1 OT (0–0, 1–1, 0–0) (OT: 1–0)	Czechia	Rogers Place, Edmonton; Attendance: 2,582

Game reference

Florian Bugl
Goalies
Jan Bednář
Referees:
(Finland) Riku Brander
(Sweden) Christoffer Holm
Linesmen:
(United States) Nick Briganti
(Germany) Andreas Hofer

Blank (Rutkowski, Münzenberger) – 24:29	1–0
	1–1	35:49 – Myšák (Špaček, Novák) (PP)
Blank (Dziambor, Leonhardt) – 61:20	2–1

6 min
Penalties
8 min
32
Shots
40

December 28, 2021; 17:00	Austria	2–11 (0–5, 1–1, 1–5)	Canada	Rogers Place, Edmonton; Attendance: 3,862

Game reference

Leon Sommer
Goalies
Brett Brochu
Referees:
(United States) Sean Fernandez
(United States) Jake Rekucki
Linesmen:
(Canada) Brett Mackey
(Czech Republic) Josef Špůr

	0–1	05:08 – Johnson (Perfetti, Power) (PP)
	0–2	06:03 – Cormier (Guenther, Greig)
	0–3	08:22 – Stankoven (McTavish, Seeley)
	0–4	15:02 – Bedard (Neighbours, Wright) (PP)
	0–5	16:13 – Bedard (Desnoyers, Cuylle)
	0–6	26:13 – Bedard (Desnoyers)
Necesany (Rohrer) – 39:29	1–6
	1–7	40:27 – Perfetti (Bourque)
	1–8	42:34 – Bedard (Cuylle, Desnoyers)
	1–9	44:44 – McTavish (Guenther, Guhle)
	1–10	45:31 – McTavish (Seeley, Power)
	1–11	46:47 – Bourque (Perfetti)
Böhm (Wallner, Reinbacher) (PP) – 52:20	2–11

10 min
Penalties
2 min
22
Shots
64

December 29, 2021; 12:00	Finland	1–0	Czechia	Rogers Place, Edmonton; Attendance: 0

Win awarded via forfeit due to COVID-19 positives within the Czechia team.

December 29, 2021; 17:00	Canada	Cancelled	Germany	Rogers Place, Edmonton

December 30, 2021; 14:30	Czechia	Cancelled	Austria	Rogers Place, Edmonton

December 31, 2021; 12:00	Germany	Cancelled	Austria	Rogers Place, Edmonton

December 31, 2021; 17:00	Canada	Cancelled	Finland	Rogers Place, Edmonton

=== Group B (December 2021) ===
Group B results (annulled)

Pos	Team	Pld	W	OTW	OTL	L	GF	GA	GD	Pts	Qualification
1	Sweden	2	2	0	0	0	9	3	+6	6	Advance to Quarterfinals
2	United States	2	1	0	0	1	3	3	0	3	Advance to Quarterfinals
3	Russia	3	1	0	0	2	7	9	−2	3	Advance to Quarterfinals
4	Switzerland	2	1	0	0	1	3	4	−1	3	Advance to Quarterfinals
5	Slovakia	3	1	0	0	2	3	6	−3	3	

Updated to match(es) played on December 28, 2021. Source: IIHF

December 26, 2021; 14:30	Russia	3–6 (0–1, 1–2, 2–3)	Sweden	Peavey Mart Centrium, Red Deer; Attendance: 2,337

Game reference

Yaroslav Askarov
Yegor Guskov
Goalies
Jesper Wallstedt
Referees:
(United States) Robert Hennessey
(Canada) Kyle Kowalski
Linesmen:
(Canada) Cody Huseby
(United States) John Rey

	0–1	05:24 – Olausson (Holtz, Grans) (PP)
	0–2	27:39 – Edvinsson (SH)
	0–3	34:16 – Andrae (Grans, Eklund) (PP2)
Svechkov (Chibrikov, Tankov) – 36:28	1–3
	1–4	43:26 – Holtz (Eklund, Andrae) (PP2)
Michkov (Demidov, Savikov) – 44:45	2–4
Michkov (Smirnov, Khusnutdinov) – 46:26	3–4
	3–5	51:37 – Niederbach (Olausson, Edvinsson)
	3–6	59:10 – Ljungman (Edvinsson) (ENG)

12 min
Penalties
4 min
30
Shots
24

December 26, 2021; 19:30	United States	3–2 (2–0, 1–0, 0–2)	Slovakia	Peavey Mart Centrium, Red Deer; Attendance: 1,613

Game reference

Drew Commesso
Goalies
Simon Latkoczy
Referees:
(Czech Republic) Adam Kika
(Finland) Joonas Kova
Linesmen:
(Canada) Ryan Jackson
(Sweden) Daniel Persson

Knies (Cooley, Peart) (PP2) – 13:35	1–0
Samoskevich (Coronato, Beniers) (PP) – 15:18	2–0
Slaggert (Kaiser, Dickinson) – 32:42	3–0
	3–1	41:03 – Chromiak (Kašlík, Kňažko) (PP)
	3–2	57:27 – Chromiak (Nemec, Myklukha)

12 min
Penalties
10 min
42
Shots
25

December 27, 2021; 14:30	Russia	4–2 (3–1, 0–0, 1–1)	Switzerland	Peavey Mart Centrium, Red Deer; Attendance: 1,934

Game reference

Yegor Guskov
Goalies
Kevin Pasche
Referees:
(Canada) Adam Bloski
(United States) Sean Fernandez
Linesmen:
(Switzerland) Dario Fuchs
(Canada) Brett Mackey

Yurov (Chibrikov) – 07:21	1–0
Zlodeyev (Didkovsky) – 15:42	2–0
Tyutnev (Grudinin, Savikov) – 17:39	3–0
	3–1	18:56 – Biasca (Sidler, Fahrni)
Michkov (Demidov, Khusnutdinov) – 51:57	4–1
	4–2	58:45 – Ritzman (Allenspach, Streule)

4 min
Penalties
2 min
32
Shots
18

December 27, 2021; 19:30	Sweden	3–0 (1–0, 1–0, 1–0)	Slovakia	Peavey Mart Centrium, Red Deer; Attendance: 1,706

Game reference

Jesper Wallstedt
Goalies
Simon Latkoczy
Referees:
(Finland) Joonas Kova
(Russia) Sergey Yudakov
Linesmen:
(Canada) Ryan Jackson
(Sweden) Daniel Persson

Niederbach (Eklund, Grans) (PP) – 06:25	1–0
Sjöberg (Nyström) – 26:50	2–0
Ljungman (Stenman) (ENG) – 58:45	3–0

35 min
Penalties
8 min
27
Shots
48

December 28, 2021; 14:30	Switzerland	1–0	United States	Peavey Mart Centrium, Red Deer; Attendance: 0

Win awarded via forfeit due to COVID-19 positives within the U.S. team.

December 29, 2021; 14:30	Slovakia	1–0	Russia	Peavey Mart Centrium, Red Deer; Attendance: 0

Win awarded via forfeit due to COVID-19 positives within the Russia team.

December 29, 2021; 19:30	Sweden	Cancelled	United States	Peavey Mart Centrium, Red Deer

December 30, 2021; 17:00	Slovakia	Cancelled	Switzerland	Peavey Mart Centrium, Red Deer

December 31, 2021; 14:30	Switzerland	Cancelled	Sweden	Peavey Mart Centrium, Red Deer

December 31, 2021; 19:30	United States	Cancelled	Russia	Peavey Mart Centrium, Red Deer

== Top Division ==
=== Venue ===
Rogers Place
Capacity: 18,347
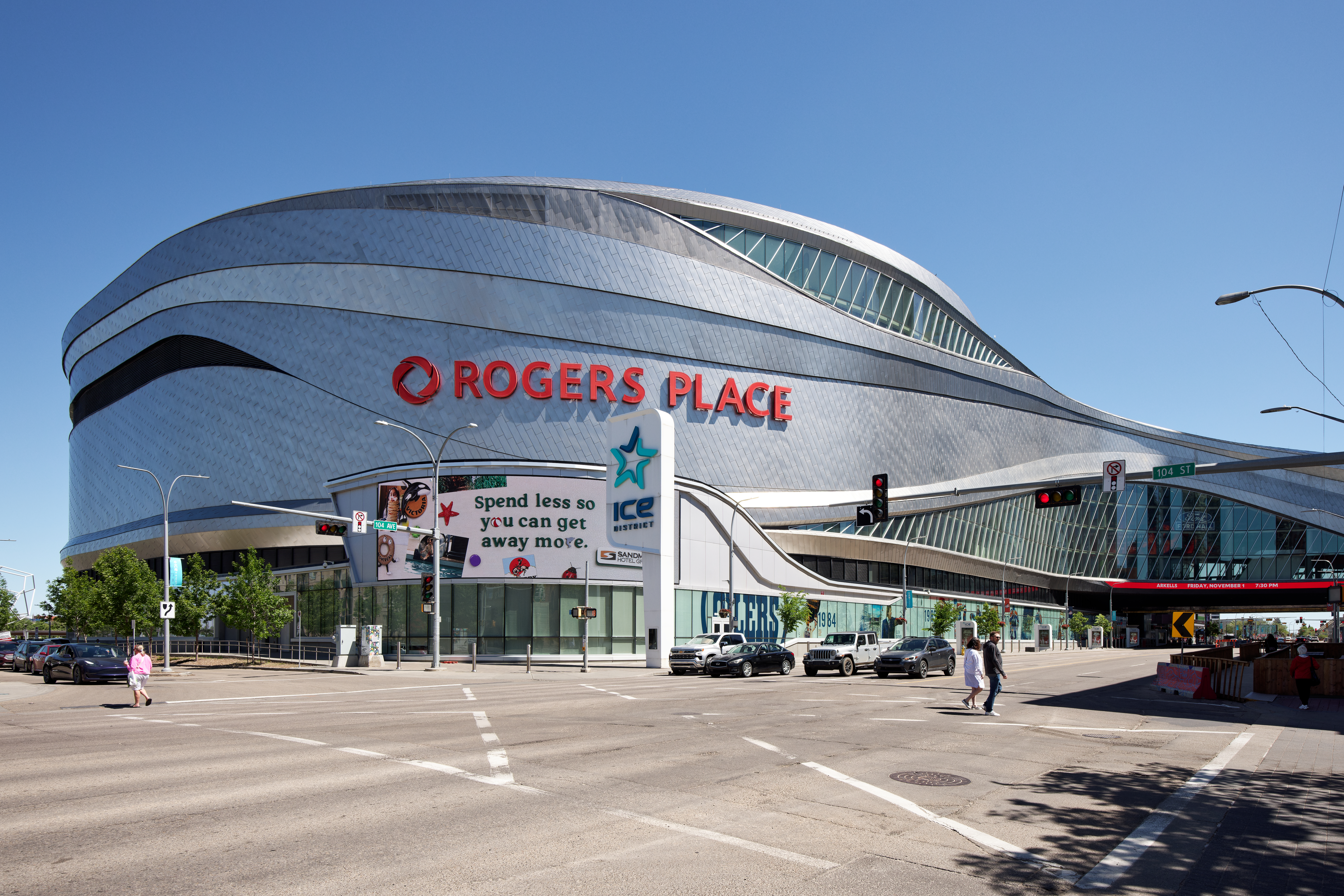
Edmonton

=== Match officials ===
The following officials were assigned by the International Ice Hockey Federation to officiate the 2022 World Junior Championships.

Referees

- (Canada) Adam Bloski
- (Finland) Riku Brander
- (United States) Sean Fernandez
- (Canada) Stephen Hiff
- (United States) Robert Hennessey
- (Sweden) Christoffer Holm
- (Germany) Sirko Hunnius
- (Czech Republic) Adam Kika
- (Finland) Joonas Kova
- (Canada) Kyle Kowalski

Linesmen

- (United States) Nick Briganti
- (Switzerland) Eric Cattaneo
- (Germany) Andreas Hofer
- (Canada) Cody Huseby
- (Finland) Niko Jusi
- (Canada) Brett Mackey
- (Canada) Shawn Oliver
- (United States) John Rey
- (Czech Republic) Josef Špůr

=== Preliminary round ===
==== Seeding ====
Group A
(Rogers Place)

- Canada (2)
- Finland (3)
- Czechia (7)
- Slovakia (8)
- Latvia (replacing Russia)

Group B
(Rogers Place)

- United States (1)
- Sweden (5)
- Germany (6)
- Switzerland (9)
- Austria (10)

==== Group A ====
Pos	Team	Pld	W	OTW	OTL	L	GF	GA	GD	Pts	Qualification
1	Canada (H)	4	4	0	0	0	27	7	+20	12	Advance to Quarterfinals
2	Finland	4	2	1	0	1	22	13	+9	8	Advance to Quarterfinals
3	Latvia	4	1	0	1	2	10	16	−6	4 (Note: Czechia 2-5 Latvia)	Advance to Quarterfinals
4	Czechia	4	1	0	1	2	11	18	−7	4	Advance to Quarterfinals
5	Slovakia	4	0	1	0	3	11	27	−16	2	

Source: IIHF
(H) Host
Notes:

9 August 2022; 12:00	Czechia	5–4 (0–2, 3–0, 2–2)	Slovakia	Rogers Place, Edmonton; Attendance: 430

Game reference

Jan Bednář
Goalies
Simon Latkoczy
Referees:
(United States) Robert Hennessey
(Sweden) Christoffer Holm
Linesmen:
(Switzerland) Eric Cattaneo
(United States) John Rey

	0–1	03:20 – Petrovský
	0–2	05:57 – Kašlík (Myklukha, Petrovický)
Ryšavý (Jiříček, Mensik) – 22:22	1–2
Gut (Myšák, Kulich) – 33:21	2–2
Šapovaliv (Mechura, Urban) – 37:35	3–2
Mysak (Gut) – 47:56	4–2
	4–3	53:56 – Petrovický (Dvorský) (PP)
	4–4	56:48 – Kašlík (Petrovský) (PP2)
Szturc (Špaček) – 58:10	5–4

10 min
Penalties
8 min
52
Shots
29

9 August 2022; 16:00	Latvia	1–6 (0–2, 0–2, 1–2)	Finland	Rogers Place, Edmonton; Attendance: 376

Game reference

Bruno Brūveris
Goalies
Leevi Meriläinen
Referees:
(Canada) Adam Bloski
(Germany) Sirko Hunnius
Linesmen:
(Finland) Niko Jusi
(Canada) Shawn Oliver

	0–1	08:54 – Kemell (Räty, Hirvonen)
	0–2	11:29 – Kemell (Hirvonen)
	0–3	21:52 – Lambert (Järventie, Heimosalmi) (PP)
	0–4	38:01 – Hirvonen (Räty, Simontaival) (PP)
Veinbergs (Hodass, Silkalns) (PP) – 41:28	1–4
	1–5	55:39 – Räty (Kemell, Heimosalmi)
	1–6	58:40 – Puutio (Kemell, Räty)

4 min
Penalties
6 min
20
Shots
39

10 August 2022; 16:00	Latvia	2–5 (1–1, 0–3, 1–1)	Canada	Rogers Place, Edmonton; Attendance: 2,779

Game reference

Patriks Berzins
Goalies
Sebastian Cossa
Referees:
(Finland) Riku Brander
(Canada) Kyle Kowalski
Linesmen:
(United States) Kevin Briganti
(Germany) Andreas Hofer

	0–1	07:31 – Bedard (Sebrango, McTavish)
Darzins - 18:06	1–1
	1–2	31:23 – Cormier (Roy, Thompson) (PP)
	1–3	36:17 – Zellweger (Bedard, McTavish) (PP)
	1–4	37:16 – Greig (Dufour)
Hodass (Silkalns, Veinsberg) (PP) - 44:56	2–4
	2–5	54:44 – Dufour (Greig, Ostapchuk)

8 min
Penalties
10 min
24
Shots
44

11 August 2022; 12:00	Finland	4–3 GWS (1–2, 1–0, 1–1) (OT: 0–0) (SO: 2–1)	Czechia	Rogers Place, Edmonton; Attendance: 530

Game reference

Leevi Meriläinen
Goalies
Jan Bednář
Referees:
(Canada) Stephen Hiff
(Canada) Kyle Kowalski
Linesmen:
(Canada) Cody Huseby
(Canada) Brett Mackey

	0–1	6:36 – Chmelař
	0–2	11:31 – Kulich (Myšák) (PP)
Järventie (Heimosalmi, Kemell) (PP) – 16:28	1–2
Puutio (Simontaival, Jurmo) – 23:39	2–2
Räty (Hirvonen, Niemelä) – 50:24	3–2
	3–3	52:38 – Myšák (Gut, Kulich)

Hirvonen (miss)
Järventie
Räty (miss)
Kemell (miss)
Simontaival
Shootout
(miss) Kulich
(miss) Gut
(miss) Chmelař
Myšák
(miss) Šapovaliv
4 min
Penalties
8 min
32
Shots
26

11 August 2022; 16:00	Slovakia	1–11 (0–4, 1–4, 0–3)	Canada	Rogers Place, Edmonton; Attendance: 3,216

Game reference

Simon Latkoczy
Tomáš Boľo
Goalies
Dylan Garand
Referees:
(Czech Republic) Adam Kika
(Finland) Joonas Kova
Linesmen:
(Finland) Niko Jusi
(Czech Republic) Josef Spur

	0–1	6:16 – Bedard (McTavish, Roy)
	0–2	13:06 – Cuylle (Greig, McTavish)
	0–3	15:57 – Othmann (Cuylle)
	0–4	19:17 – Zellweger (Stankoven, Foerster)
	0–5	21:02 – Stankoven (Johnson, Cormier) (PP)
	0–6	26:25 – McTavish (Sebrango)
Kašlík (Myklukha, Nemec) – 34:40	1–6
	1–7	35:16 – McTavish (Othmann, Cormier)
	1–8	39:25 – McTavish (Roy, Bedard)
	1–9	43:44 – McTavish (Othmann)
	1–10	55:07 – Roy (Dufour, Zellweger)
	1–11	59:39 – Ostapchuk (Roy, Dufour)

8 min
Penalties
6 min
23
Shots
44

12 August 2022; 16:00	Slovakia	3–2 GWS (1–1, 1–1, 0–0) (OT: 0–0) (SO: 2–1)	Latvia	Rogers Place, Edmonton; Attendance: 489

Game reference

Simon Latkoczy
Goalies
Bruno Brūveris
Referees:
(Canada) Adam Bloski
(United States) Sean Fernandez
Linesmen:
(Switzerland) Eric Cattaneo
(Canada) Cody Huseby

	0–1	9:44 – Locmelis (Laviņš, Bergmanis) (PP)
Sýkora (Demek, Natny) – 17:57	1–1
Dvorský (Nemec, Faith) – 29:54	2–1
	2–2	32:39 – Fenenko (Bergmanis, Andersons)

Faith
Petrovský (miss)
Dvorský (miss)
Myklukha (miss)
Kašlík
Shootout
(miss) Locmelis
Dukurs
(miss) Silkalns
(miss) Vilmanis
(miss) Vitolins
6 min
Penalties
6 min
42
Shots
25

13 August 2022; 16:00	Canada	5–1 (2–1, 2–0, 1–0)	Czechia	Rogers Place, Edmonton; Attendance: 5,135

Game reference

Dylan Garand
Goalies
Tomáš Suchánek
Referees:
(United States) Sean Fernandez
(Germany) Sirko Hunnius
Linesmen:
(United States) Kevin Briganti
(Canada) Brett Mackey

	0–1	05:10 – Ryšavý (Kos) (SH)
McTavish (Thompson, Seeley) – 16:44	1–1
Johnson (Stankoven, Thompson) – 19:00	2–1
Greig (Seeley, Cormier) (PP) – 24:48	3–1
McTavish (Bedard, Othmann) – 31:05	4–1
Foerster (Johnson, Stankoven) – 47:39	5–1

4 min
Penalties
27 min
57
Shots
23

14 August 2022; 12:00	Finland	9–3 (2–1, 4–1, 3–1)	Slovakia	Rogers Place, Edmonton; Attendance: 659

Game reference

Juha Jatkola
Goalies
Simon Latkoczy
Referees:
(United States) Sean Fernandez
(Finland) Joonas Kova
Linesmen:
(Germany) Andreas Hofer
(Canada) Cody Huseby

Simontaival (Hirvonen) – 0:35	1–0
	1–1	7:42 – Repčík (Groch)
Määttä (PP) - 14:02	2–1
Hirvonen (Simontaival, Puutio) (PP) – 20:24	3–1
	3–2	27:04 – Petrovský (Petrovický, Nemec)
Määttä (Järventie, Kemell) (PP) – 31:42	4–2
Räty (Kemell, Niemelä) – 36:41	5–2
Kapanen (Rafkin, Järventie) – 38:08	6–2
Väisänen (Mäenpää, Rajaniemi) – 46:11	7–2
	7–3	49:16 – Nemec (Petrovický, Mišiak)
Simontaival (Puutio, Räty) (PP) – 51:45	8–3
Puutio (Räty, Niemelä) (PP) – 55:17	9–3

4 min
Penalties
37 min
48
Shots
16

14 August 2022; 16:00	Czechia	2–5 (1–2, 1–2, 0–1)	Latvia	Rogers Place, Edmonton; Attendance: 493

Game reference

Jan Bednář
Goalies
Bruno Brūveris
Referees:
(Finland) Riku Brander
(Canada) Stephen Hiff
Linesmen:
(Canada) Shawn Oliver
(Czech Republic) Josef Spur

	0–1	04:30 – Laviņš (Brants)
	0–2	12:21 – Rullers (Vītoliņš, Ozoliņš)
Gut (Myšák, Szovil) (PP) – 16:43	1–2
Svozil (Hauser, Urban) – 29:33	2–2
	2–3	31:15 – Bergmanis (Dukurs)
	2–4	37:38 – Bergmanis (Sikalns, Ravinskis) (PP)
	2–5	58:41 – Bergmanis (ENG)

6 min
Penalties
6 min
35
Shots
17

15 August 2022; 16:00	Canada	6–3 (3–1, 2–0, 1–2)	Finland	Rogers Place, Edmonton; Attendance: 5,204

Game reference

Dylan Garand
Goalies
Leevi Meriläinen
Referees:
(United States) Robert Hennessey
(Sweden) Christoffer Holm
Linesmen:
(Germany) Andreas Hofer
(United States) John Rey

Othmann (Zellweger, Bedard) – 06:21	1–0
Foerster (Greig, McTavish) (PP) – 12:14	2–0
Bedard (McTavish, Cormier) – 17:19	3–0
	3–1	19:03 – Helenius (Väisänen, Liukas)
Greig (Roy, Zellweger) – 20:31	4–1
McTavish (Zellweger, Johnson) (PP) – 36:17	5–1
	5–2	43:07 – Kemell (Niemelä, Räty)
	5–3	56:23 – Järventie (Kemell, Heimosalmi) (PP, EA)
Dufour (Ostapchuk, McTavish) (ENG) – 58:13	6–3

33 min
Penalties
4 min
37
Shots
25

==== Group B ====
Pos	Team	Pld	W	OTW	OTL	L	GF	GA	GD	Pts	Qualification
1	United States	4	4	0	0	0	22	4	+18	12	Advance to Quarterfinals
2	Sweden	4	3	0	0	1	15	7	+8	9	Advance to Quarterfinals
3	Germany	4	2	0	0	2	10	13	−3	6	Advance to Quarterfinals
4	Switzerland	4	1	0	0	3	8	15	−7	3	Advance to Quarterfinals
5	Austria	4	0	0	0	4	4	20	−16	0	

Source: IIHF

9 August 2022; 20:00	United States	5–1 (2–0, 3–0, 0–1)	Germany	Rogers Place, Edmonton; Attendance: 829

Game reference

Kaidan Mbereko
Goalies
Nikita Quapp
Referees:
(Finland) Riku Brander
(Canada) Stephen Hiff
Linesmen:
(Canada) Brett Mackey
(Czech Republic) Josef Spur

Hughes (Slaggert, Bordeleau) – 13:39	1–0
Cooley (Coronato, Peart) (PP) – 18:01	2–0
Slaggert (Hughes, Mazur) – 21:21	3–0
Savage (Duran, Pastujov) – 21:57	4–0
Duran (Pastujov, James) – 39:00	5–0
	5–1	53:12 – Samanski (Szuber, Quapp)

2 min
Penalties
29 min
50
Shots
11

10 August 2022; 12:00	Sweden	3–2 (0–0, 1–0, 2–2)	Switzerland	Rogers Place, Edmonton; Attendance: 453

Game reference

Jesper Wallstedt
Goalies
Noah Patenaude
Referees:
(United States) Sean Fernandez
(United States) Robert Hennessey
Linesmen:
(Canada) Cody Huseby
(United States) John Rey

Torgersson (Edvinsson, Grans) – 36:55	1–0
Torgersson (Niederbach) – 40:24	2–0
Rosén (Ljungman, Lysell) – 40:34	3–0
	3–1	48:47 – Biasca (Henry, Nussbaumer)
	3–2	49:47 – Allenspach (Fahrni)

33 min
Penalties
4 min
29
Shots
23

10 August 2022; 20:00	Germany	4–2 (1–1, 3–1, 0–0)	Austria	Rogers Place, Edmonton; Attendance: 473

Game reference

Florian Bugl
Goalies
Sebastian Wraneschitz
Referees:
(Czech Republic) Adam Kika
(Finland) Joonas Kova
Linesmen:
(Switzerland) Eric Cattaneo
(Canada) Shawn Oliver

	0–1	02:45 – Peeters (Urbanek, Scherzer) (PP)
Eham (Blank, Leonhardt) – 08:00	1–1
	1–2	21:40 – Dobnig (Peeters, Scherzer)
Blank (Klein, Eham) – 23:37	2–2
Blank (Volek, Samanski) (PP) – 28:49	3–2
Blank (Volek) (PP) – 31:03	4–2

8 min
Penalties
37 min
44
Shots
17

11 August 2022; 20:00	Switzerland	1–7 (0–0, 1–5, 0–2)	United States	Rogers Place, Edmonton; Attendance: 836

Game reference

Kevin Pasche
Noah Patenaude
Goalies
Kaidan Mbereko
Referees:
(Canada) Adam Bloski
(Germany) Sirko Hunnius
Linesmen:
(Canada) Andreas Hofer
(United States) John Rey

	0–1	25:54 – Mazur (Samoskevich, Bordeleau) (PP)
Henry (Biasca, Zanetti) – 28:25	1–1
	1–2	31:29 – Faber (Hughes, Bordeleau)
	1–3	33:22 – Mazur (Slaggert, Faber)
	1–4	37:16 – Slaggert (Kaiser, Mazur)
	1–5	39:23 – Coronato (Hughes, Savage)
	1–6	41:57 – Bordeleau (Hughes, Samoskevich) (PP)
	1–7	55:23 – Duran (Cooley)

8 min
Penalties
6 min
24
Shots
39

12 August 2022; 12:00	Austria	0–6 (0–1, 0–3, 0–2)	Sweden	Rogers Place, Edmonton

Game reference

Sebastian Wraneschitz
Goalies
Calle Clang
Referees:
(Finland) Riku Brander
(Sweden) Christoffer Holm
Linesmen:
(United States) Kevin Briganti
(Finland) Niko Jusi

0–1	12:57 – Edvinsson (Olausson)
0–2	20:59 – Rosén (Lysell, Grans) (PP)
0–3	34:35 – Andrae (Rosén)
0–4	35:30 – Andrae (Lekkerimäki, Olausson) (PP)
0–5	49:07 – Lysell (Stakkestad, Öhgren (PP)
0–6	59:34 – Niederbach (Olausson, Andrae)

10 min
Penalties
4 min
14
Shots
41

13 August 2022; 12:00	Austria	0–7 (0–4, 0–2, 0–1)	United States	Rogers Place, Edmonton; Attendance: 702

Game reference

Leon Sommer
Goalies
Andrew Oke
Remington Keopple
Referees:
(United States) Robert Hennessey
(Canada) Stephen Hiff
Linesmen:
(Canada) Shawn Oliver
(Czech Republic) Josef Spur

0–1	00:54 – Kaiser (Coronato)
0–2	02:32 – Coronato (Cooley, Knies)
0–3	11:40 – Kaiser (Savage, Duran)
0–4	18:26 – Savage (Moore, Duran)
0–5	27:01 – Mazur (Pastujov, Bordeleau)
0–6	27:58 – Mazur (Bordeleau, Samoskevich) (PP)
0–7	59:19 – Pastujov (Stramel, Peart)

4 min
Penalties
8 min
15
Shots
56

13 August 2022; 20:00	Germany	3–2 (2–1, 1–0, 0–1)	Switzerland	Rogers Place, Edmonton; Attendance: 642

Game reference

Florian Bugl
Goalies
Kevin Pasche
Referees:
(Sweden) Christoffer Holm
(Canada) Kyle Kowalski
Linesmen:
(Germany) Andreas Hofer
(United States) John Rey

Roßmy (Proske, Heigl) – 5:37	1–0
Heigl (Proske, Roßmy) – 8:16	2–0
	2–1	19:51 – Knak (Allenspach, Fahrni)
Hänelt (Klein) – 36:43	3–1
	3–2	51:40 – Taibel (Ritzmann, Alge)

4 min
Penalties
10 min
29
Shots
25

14 August 2022; 20:00	United States	3–2 (1–0, 1–0, 1–2)	Sweden	Rogers Place, Edmonton; Attendance: 2,025

Game reference

Kaidan Mbereko
Goalies
Jesper Wallstedt
Referees:
(Czech Republic) Adam Kika
(Canada) Kyle Kowalski
Linesmen:
(Finland) Niko Jusi
(Canada) Brett Mackey

Berard (Bordeleau, Hughes) (PP) – 06:35	1–0
Coronato (Cooley, Knies) – 25:37	2–0
Coronato (Slaggert, Cooley) – 45:26	3–0
	3–1	51:38 – Andrae (Wallinder, Magnusson)
	3–2	58:45 – Stakkestad (Andrae, Olausson) (PP, EA)

6 min
Penalties
6 min
41
Shots
30

15 August 2022; 12:00	Switzerland	3–2 (1–1, 1–1, 1–0)	Austria	Rogers Place, Edmonton; Attendance: 356

Game reference

Noah Patenaude
Goalies
Sebastian Wraneschitz
Referees:
(Germany) Sirko Hunnius
(Czech Republic) Adam Kika
Linesmen:
(United States) Kevin Briganti
(Canada) Shawn Oliver

	0–1	8:08 – Wallner (Reinbacher, Maier)
Fahrni (Biasca, Allenspach) (PP) – 17:31	1–1
Taibel (Ritzmann, Bächler) – 34:17	2–1
	2–2	39:35 – Scherzer (Reinbacher, Peeters)
Biasca (Ritzmann, Allenspach) (PP) – 55:53	3–2

2 min
Penalties
31 min
39
Shots
22

15 August 2022; 20:00	Sweden	4–2 (3–1, 0–0, 1–1)	Germany	Rogers Place, Edmonton; Attendance: 741

Game reference

Calle Clang
Goalies
Nikita Quapp
Niklas Lunemann
Referees:
(Canada) Adam Bloski
(Finland) Joonas Kova
Linesmen:
(Switzerland) Eric Cattaneo
(Canada) Cody Huseby

	0–1	4:09 – Rossmy (Dziambor, Schweiger)
Olausson (Andrae, Lekkerimäki) (PP) – 5:52	1–1
Ljungman (Olsson, Lysell) – 12:29	2–1
Magnusson (Andrae, Grans) – 13:56	3–1
Ljungman (Niederbach, Lekkerimäki) (PP) – 45:46	4–1
	4–2	59:52 – Munzenberger (Leonhardt)

8 min
Penalties
4 min
30
Shots
22

=== Playoff round ===
Winning teams will be reseeded for the semi-finals in accordance with the following ranking:

1. higher position in the group
2. higher number of points
3. better goal difference
4. higher number of goals scored for
5. better seeding coming into the tournament (final placement at the 2021 World Junior Ice Hockey Championships).

Rank	Team	Group	Pos	Pts	GD	GF	Seed
1	Canada	A	1	12	+20	27	2
2	United States	B	1	12	+18	22	1
3	Sweden	B	2	9	+8	15	5
4	Finland	A	2	8	+9	22	3
5	Germany	B	3	6	–3	10	6
6	Latvia	A	3	4	−6	10	12
7	Czechia	A	4	4	−7	11	7
8	Switzerland	B	4	3	−7	8	9

==== Bracket ====
Quarterfinals
17 August – Rogers Place
1A Canada	6
4B Switzerland	3
17 August – Rogers Place
2B Sweden	2
3A Latvia	1
17 August – Rogers Place
1B United States	2
4A Czechia	4
17 August – Rogers Place
2A Finland	5
3B Germany	2

Semifinals
19 August – Rogers Place
1 Canada	5
7 Czechia	2
19 August – Rogers Place
3 Sweden	0
4 Finland	1

Final
20 August – Rogers Place
Canada (OT)	3
Finland	2
Third place
20 August – Rogers Place
Sweden	3
Czechia	1

==== Quarterfinals ====
17 August 2022; 10:00	Finland	5–2 (3–1, 0–1, 2–0)	Germany	Rogers Place, Edmonton; Attendance: 448

Game reference

Leevi Meriläinen
Goalies
Florian Bugl
Referees:
(Canada) Adam Bloski
(Czech Republic) Adam Kika
Linesmen:
(Switzerland) Eric Cattaneo
(Canada) Cody Huseby

Simontaival (Järventie, Määttä) – 03:37	1–0
Hirvonen (Simontaival, Puutio) (PP) – 11:06	2–0
	2–1	12:50 – Roßmy (Rutkowski, Leonhardt) (PP)
Järventie (Heimosalmi, Kemell) (PP) – 14:48	3–1
	3–2	37:21 – Roßmy (Hänelt, Münzenberger) (PP)
Järventie (Heimosalmi, Kapanen) (PP) – 46:22	4–2
Määttä (Järventie, Kemell) (PP) – 55:53	5–2

6 min
Penalties
12 min
22
Shots
21

17 August 2022; 13:30	Sweden	2–1 (1–0, 0–1, 1–0)	Latvia	Rogers Place, Edmonton; Attendance: 518

Game reference

Jesper Wallstedt
Goalies
Bruno Brūveris
Referees:
(United States) Sean Fernandez
(Canada) Kyle Kowalski
Linesmen:
(Germany) Andreas Hofer
(United States) John Rey

Rosén (Lysell, Stakkestad) (PP) – 16:44	1–0
	1–1	38:46 – Ozoliņš (Locmelis, Vilmanis)
Andrae (Wallinder, Ljungman) – 49:49	2–1

2 min
Penalties
27 min
27
Shots
13

17 August 2022; 17:00	Canada	6–3 (4–2, 1–1, 1–0)	Switzerland	Rogers Place, Edmonton; Attendance: 4,898

Game reference

Dylan Garand
Goalies
Noah Patenaude
Kevin Pasche
Referees:
(Germany) Sirko Hunnius
(Finland) Joonas Kova
Linesmen:
(Finland) Niko Jusi
(Czech Republic) Josef Špůr

Foerster (Stankoven, Seeley) – 01:07	1–0
	1–1	02:21 – Knak (Zanetti, Despont)
Thompson (Seeley, McTavish) – 12:31	2–1
Stankoven – 14:32	3–1
Gaucher (Desnoyers, O'Rourke) – 17:01	4–1
	4–2	19:51 – Biasca (Fahrni, Taibel)
Cuylle (Zellweger, Foerster) – 24:20	5–2
	5–3	27:51 – Biasca
Stankoven (Johnson) (ENG) – 58:51	6–3

4 min
Penalties
4 min
41
Shots
26

17 August 2022; 20:30	United States	2–4 (1–1, 0–2, 1–1)	Czechia	Rogers Place, Edmonton; Attendance: 739

Game reference

Kaidan Mbereko
Goalies
Tomáš Suchánek
Referees:
(Canada) Stephen Hiff
(Sweden) Christoffer Holm
Linesmen:
(Canada) Brett Mackey
(Canada) Shawn Oliver

Cooley (Coronato, Knies) – 12:03	1–0
	1–1	17:55 – Myšák (Ticháček, Kulich)
	1–2	27:34 – Hauser (Ivan, Jiříček)
	1–3	30:45 – Šapovaliv (Kulich, Hamara)
Mazur (Slaggert, Bordeleau) (PP) – 51:31	2–3
	2–4	58:28 – Kulich (ENG)

25 min
Penalties
27 min
30
Shots
24

==== Semifinals ====
19 August 2022; 14:00	Canada	5–2 (2–0, 2–0, 1–2)	Czechia	Rogers Place, Edmonton; Attendance: 5,092

Game reference

Dylan Garand
Goalies
Tomáš Suchánek
Pavel Čajan
Referees:
(United States) Sean Fernandez
(Sweden) Christoffer Holm
Linesmen:
(United States) Kevin Briganti
(United States) John Rey

Johnson (Stankoven, Foerster) – 10:04	1–0
Bedard (Gaucher, Cuylle) – 15:20	2–0
Stankoven (Johnson, Zellweger) (PP) – 31:28	3–0
McTavish (Johnson, Zellweger) (PP) – 36:11	4–0
	4–1	50:54 – Myšák (Kulich, Svozil)
	4–2	52:44 – Gut (Jiříček, Kulich) (PP)
Roy (Zellweger, Dufour) – 54:26	5–2

4 min
Penalties
6 min
35
Shots
32

19 August 2022; 18:00	Sweden	0–1 (0–0, 0–1, 0–0)	Finland	Rogers Place, Edmonton; Attendance: 1,044

Game reference
Jesper Wallstedt	Goalies	Juha Jatkola	Referees: (Canada) Adam Bloski (Canada) Kyle Kowalski; Linesmen: (Canada) Brett Mackey (Czech Republic) Josef Spur
0–1 / 25:18 – Puutio (Räty, Niemelä) (PP)			Referees: (Canada) Adam Bloski (Canada) Kyle Kowalski; Linesmen: (Canada) Brett Mackey (Czech Republic) Josef Spur
8 min	Penalties	4 min	Referees: (Canada) Adam Bloski (Canada) Kyle Kowalski; Linesmen: (Canada) Brett Mackey (Czech Republic) Josef Spur
23	Shots	28	Referees: (Canada) Adam Bloski (Canada) Kyle Kowalski; Linesmen: (Canada) Brett Mackey (Czech Republic) Josef Spur

==== Bronze medal game ====
20 August 2022; 14:00	Sweden	3–1 (1–0, 1–1, 1–0)	Czechia	Rogers Place, Edmonton; Attendance: 3,252

Game reference

Jesper Wallstedt
Goalies
Tomáš Suchánek
Referees:
(Canada) Adam Bloski
(Canada) Kyle Kowalski
Linesmen:
(United States) John Rey
(Czech Republic) Josef Spur

Lysell (Grans, Stakkestad) – 14:22	1–0
	1–1	33:30 – Gut (Myšák, Jiříček) (PP)
Rosén (Niederbach) – 35:19	2–1
Sjödin (Wallinder) – 56:34	3–1

6 min
Penalties
2 min
23
Shots
28

==== Gold medal game ====
20 August 2022; 18:00	Canada	3–2 OT (1–0, 1–0, 0–2) (OT: 1–0)	Finland	Rogers Place, Edmonton; Attendance: 13,327

Game reference

Dylan Garand
Goalies
Juha Jatkola
Referees:
(United States) Sean Fernandez
(Sweden) Christoffer Holm
Linesmen:
(Germany) Andreas Hofer
(Canada) Cody Huseby

Roy (McTavish) – 11:18	1–0
Dufour (Zellweger, McTavish) – 20:41	2–0
	2–1	Heimosalmi (Viro, Mäenpää) – 44:09
	2–2	Kemell (Niemelä, Liukas) – 50:46
Johnson (Stankoven) – 63:20	3–2

2 min
Penalties
14 min
33
Shots
31

=== Statistics ===
==== Scoring leaders ====
Pos	Player	Country	GP	G	A	Pts	+/−	PIM
1	Mason McTavish	Canada	7	8	9	17	+13	2
2	Joakim Kemell	Finland	7	4	8	12	+4	0
3	Olen Zellweger	Canada	7	2	9	11	+14	2
4	Logan Stankoven	Canada	7	4	6	10	+8	2
5	Aatu Räty	Finland	7	3	7	10	+2	2
6	Roby Järventie	Finland	7	4	5	9	–4	4
7	Kent Johnson	Canada	7	3	6	9	+8	2
8	Jan Myšák	Czechia	7	5	3	8	+3	0
9	Emil Andrae	Sweden	7	4	4	8	+6	6
9	Connor Bedard	Canada	7	4	4	8	+9	2

GP = Games played; G = Goals; A = Assists; Pts = Points; +/− = Plus–minus; PIM = Penalties In Minutes
Source: IIHF.com

==== Goaltending leaders ====
(minimum 40% team's total ice time)

Pos	Player	Country	TOI	GA	GAA	SA	Sv%	SO
1	Jesper Wallstedt	Sweden	296:49	8	1.62	133	93.98	0
2	Dylan Garand	Canada	363:20	12	1.98	148	92.50	0
3	Kaidan Mbereko	United States	238:19	7	1.76	88	92.05	0
4	Juha Jatkola	Finland	183:20	6	1.96	72	91.67	1
5	Bruno Brūveris	Latvia	244:15	12	2.95	142	91.55	0

TOI = Time on ice (minutes:seconds); GA = Goals against; GAA = Goals against average; SA = Shots against; Sv% = Save percentage; SO = Shutouts
Source: IIHF.com

=== Awards ===
- Best players selected by the directorate:
  - Best Goaltender: (Sweden) Jesper Wallstedt
  - Best Defenceman: (Finland) Kasper Puutio
  - Best Forward: (Canada) Mason McTavish

Source: IIHF

- Media All-Stars:
  - MVP: (Canada) Mason McTavish
  - Goaltender: (Sweden) Jesper Wallstedt
  - Defencemen: (Canada) Olen Zellweger / (Sweden) Emil Andrae
  - Forwards: (Canada) Mason McTavish / (Finland) Joakim Kemell / (Czech Republic) Jan Myšák

Source: IIHF

=== Final standings ===
Pos	Grp	Team	Pld	W	OTW	OTL	L	GF	GA	GD	Pts	Final result
1	A	Canada (H)	7	6	1	0	0	41	14	+27	20	Champions
2	A	Finland	7	4	1	1	1	30	18	+12	15	Runners-up
3	B	Sweden	7	5	0	0	2	20	10	+10	15	Third place
4	A	Czech Republic	7	2	0	1	4	18	28	−10	7	Fourth place
5	B	United States	5	4	0	0	1	24	8	+16	12	Eliminated in Quarterfinals
6	B	Germany	5	2	0	0	3	12	18	−6	6	Eliminated in Quarterfinals
7	A	Latvia	5	1	0	1	3	11	18	−7	4	Eliminated in Quarterfinals
8	B	Switzerland	5	1	0	0	4	11	21	−10	3	Eliminated in Quarterfinals
9	A	Slovakia	4	0	1	0	3	11	27	−16	2	Eliminated in Preliminary round
10	B	Austria	4	0	0	0	4	4	20	−16	0	Eliminated in Preliminary round

Source: IIHF
(H) Host

== Division I ==
=== Group A ===
The Division I Group A tournament was played in Hørsholm, Denmark, from December 12 to 18, 2021.

Pos	Team	Pld	W	OTW	OTL	L	GF	GA	GD	Pts	Promotion
1	Belarus (Note: Belarus was suspended from all IIHF competitions in May 2022 due to IIHF ban)	5	5	0	0	0	26	8	+18	15	Suspended from IIHF competitions
2	Latvia (Note: Latvia was promoted to replace Russia in the Top Division after the latter was also suspended from all IIHF competitions)	5	4	0	0	1	19	10	+9	12	Promoted to the 2022 Top Division
3	Norway	5	3	0	0	2	20	13	+7	9	
4	Kazakhstan	5	2	0	0	3	12	14	−2	6	
5	Denmark (H)	5	1	0	0	4	13	24	−11	3	
6	Hungary	5	0	0	0	5	5	26	−21	0	

Source: IIHF
Rules for classification: 1) points; 2) head-to-head points; 3) head-to-head goal difference; 4) head-to-head number of goals scored; 5) result against closest best-ranked team outside tied teams; 6) result against second-best ranked team outside tied teams; 7) seeding before tournament.
(H) Host

=== Group B ===
The Division I Group B tournament was played in Tallinn, Estonia, from December 12 to 18, 2021.

Pos	Team	Pld	W	OTW	OTL	L	GF	GA	GD	Pts	Promotion
1	France	5	4	0	1	0	23	15	+8	13	Promoted to the 2023 Division I A
2	Slovenia	5	4	0	0	1	28	13	+15	12	Promoted to the 2023 Division I A
3	Japan	5	3	0	0	2	22	17	+5	9	
4	Ukraine	5	2	1	0	2	23	20	+3	8	
5	Estonia (H)	5	0	1	0	4	9	25	−16	2	
6	Poland	5	0	0	1	4	9	24	−15	1	

Source: IIHF
Rules for classification: 1) points; 2) head-to-head points; 3) head-to-head goal difference; 4) head-to-head number of goals scored; 5) result against closest best-ranked team outside tied teams; 6) result against second-best ranked team outside tied teams; 7) seeding before tournament.
(H) Host

== Division II ==
=== Group A ===
The Division II Group A tournament was played in Brașov, Romania, from December 13 to 19, 2021.

Pos	Team	Pld	W	OTW	OTL	L	GF	GA	GD	Pts	Promotion
1	Italy	5	5	0	0	0	22	4	+18	15	Promoted to the 2023 Division I B
2	South Korea	5	2	2	0	1	17	13	+4	10	Promoted to the 2023 Division I B
3	Great Britain	5	2	0	1	2	21	17	+4	7 (Note: Great Britain 7–2 Spain)	
4	Spain	5	2	0	1	2	7	12	−5	7	
5	Lithuania	5	1	0	0	4	12	22	−10	3 (Note: Lithuania 6–3 Romania)	
6	Romania (H)	5	1	0	0	4	8	19	−11	3	

Source: IIHF
Rules for classification: 1) points; 2) head-to-head points; 3) head-to-head goal difference; 4) head-to-head number of goals scored; 5) result against closest best-ranked team outside tied teams; 6) result against second-best ranked team outside tied teams; 7) seeding before tournament.
(H) Host

=== Group B ===
The Division II Group B tournament would have been held in Belgrade, Serbia, from January 10 to 16, 2022, but it was cancelled due to the COVID-19 pandemic. It was rescheduled and took place from September 12 to 17, 2022.

Pos	Team	Pld	W	OTW	OTL	L	GF	GA	GD	Pts	Promotion
1	Croatia	4	4	0	0	0	18	8	+10	12	Promoted to the 2023 Division II A
2	Netherlands	4	3	0	0	1	16	10	+6	9	Promoted to the 2023 Division II A
3	Serbia (H)	4	1	0	1	2	12	12	0	4	
4	Belgium	4	1	0	0	3	11	21	−10	3	
5	Iceland	4	0	1	0	3	10	16	−6	2	
6	~~China~~	0	0	0	0	0	0	0	0	0	Withdrew

Source: IIHF
Rules for classification: 1) points; 2) head-to-head points; 3) head-to-head goal difference; 4) head-to-head number of goals scored; 5) result against closest best-ranked team outside tied teams; 6) result against second-best ranked team outside tied teams; 7) seeding before tournament.
(H) Host

== Division III ==
The tournament would have been held in Querétaro, Mexico, from January 6 to 16, 2022, but it was cancelled due to the COVID-19 pandemic. It was rescheduled and took place from July 22 to 30, 2022. Bulgaria withdrew from the July tournament and was replaced by Australia, which originally opted out of the January tournament.

=== Playoffs ===
Quarterfinals
27 July
A1 Chinese Taipei	7
B4 South Africa	2
27 July
B1 Australia	5
A4 Kyrgyzstan	1
27 July
A2 Israel	7
B3 Bosnia and Herzegovina	3
27 July
B2 Turkey	2
A3 Mexico	5

Semifinals
29 July
2 Chinese Taipei (OT)	6
4 Israel	5
29 July
1 Australia	2
5 Mexico	3

Final
30 July
2 Chinese Taipei (OT)	5
5 Mexico	4
3rd place match
30 July
1 Australia	1
4 Israel	0

7th place match
29 July
7	Kyrgyzstan (OT)	4
8	South Africa	3

5th place match
30 July
3	Turkey	5
6	Bosnia and Herzegovina	1

=== Final standings ===
Position	Team	Promotion
1	Chinese Taipei	Promoted to the 2023 Division II B
2	Mexico	Promoted to the 2023 Division II B
3	Australia	
4	Israel	
5	Turkey	
6	Bosnia and Herzegovina	
7	Kyrgyzstan	
8	South Africa	
