= Kalle Väisänen =

Finnish ice hockey player (born 2003)

- Born: 28 January 2003 (age 23) Kotka, Finland
- Height: 6 ft 5 in (196 cm)
- Weight: 203 lb (92 kg; 14 st 7 lb)
- Position: Left wing
- Shoots: Right
- NHL team (P) Cur. team Former teams: Boston Bruins; Maine Mariners (ECHL); TPS
- NHL draft: 106th overall, 2021; New York Rangers
- Playing career: 2021–present

Kalle Väisänen (born 28 January 2003) is a Finnish professional ice hockey player who is a left winger for the Maine Mariners of the ECHL as a prospect to the Boston Bruins of the National Hockey League (NHL)

== Playing career ==
Väisänen was drafted in the fourth round, 106th overall, by the New York Rangers in the 2021 NHL entry draft. He made his professional debut for TPS during the 2021–22 Liiga season.

On 2 April 2024, the Rangers signed Väisänen to a three-year, entry-level contract. He joined New York's American Hockey League (AHL) affiliate, the Hartford Wolf Pack, for the end of the 2023–24 season after the end of TPS's season. He was loaned to Ives of the Liiga for the 2024–25 season, and returned to Hartford for the 2025–26 AHL season.

After completing a full season with the Wolf Pack, Väisänen was traded by the Rangers along with a 2028 fourth-round pick to the Boston Bruins in exchange for Joonas Korpisalo on 1 July 2026.

== International play ==
Medal record

Men's ice hockey

Representing Finland

World Junior Championships
Silver medal – second place	2022 Canada	

Väisänen represented Finland under-18 team at the 2021 World U18 Championships where he recorded one assist in five games. He then represented Finland junior team at the 2022 World Junior Championships and won a silver medal.

== Career statistics ==
=== Regular season and playoffs ===
			Regular season					Playoffs
Season	Team	League	GP	G	A	Pts	PIM	GP	G	A	Pts	PIM
2020–21	TPS	U20	27	9	21	30	34	1	0	0	0	14
2021–22	TPS	U20	17	8	12	20	18	6	2	1	3	2
2021–22	TPS	Liiga	32	1	4	5	8	1	0	0	0	0
2022–23	TPS	Liiga	47	4	1	5	8	3	0	0	0	0
2022–23	TPS	U20	1	0	0	0	0	5	1	0	1	2
2023–24	TPS	Liiga	58	9	5	14	16	9	1	3	4	0
2023–24	Hartford Wolf Pack	AHL	3	0	0	0	2	1	0	0	0	0
2024–25	Ilves	Liiga	48	5	4	9	12	5	0	0	0	0
2025–26	Hartford Wolf Pack	AHL	51	3	1	4	0	—	—	—	—	—
Liiga totals			185	19	14	33	44	18	1	3	4	0

=== International ===
Year	Team	Event	Result	GP	G	A	Pts	PIM
2021	Finland	U18	4th	5	0	1	1	4
2022	Finland	WJC	2nd place, silver medalist(s)	7	1	1	2	0
2023	Finland	WJC	5th	5	1	1	2	2
Junior totals				17	2	3	5	6
