= Topi Niemelä =

Finnish ice hockey player

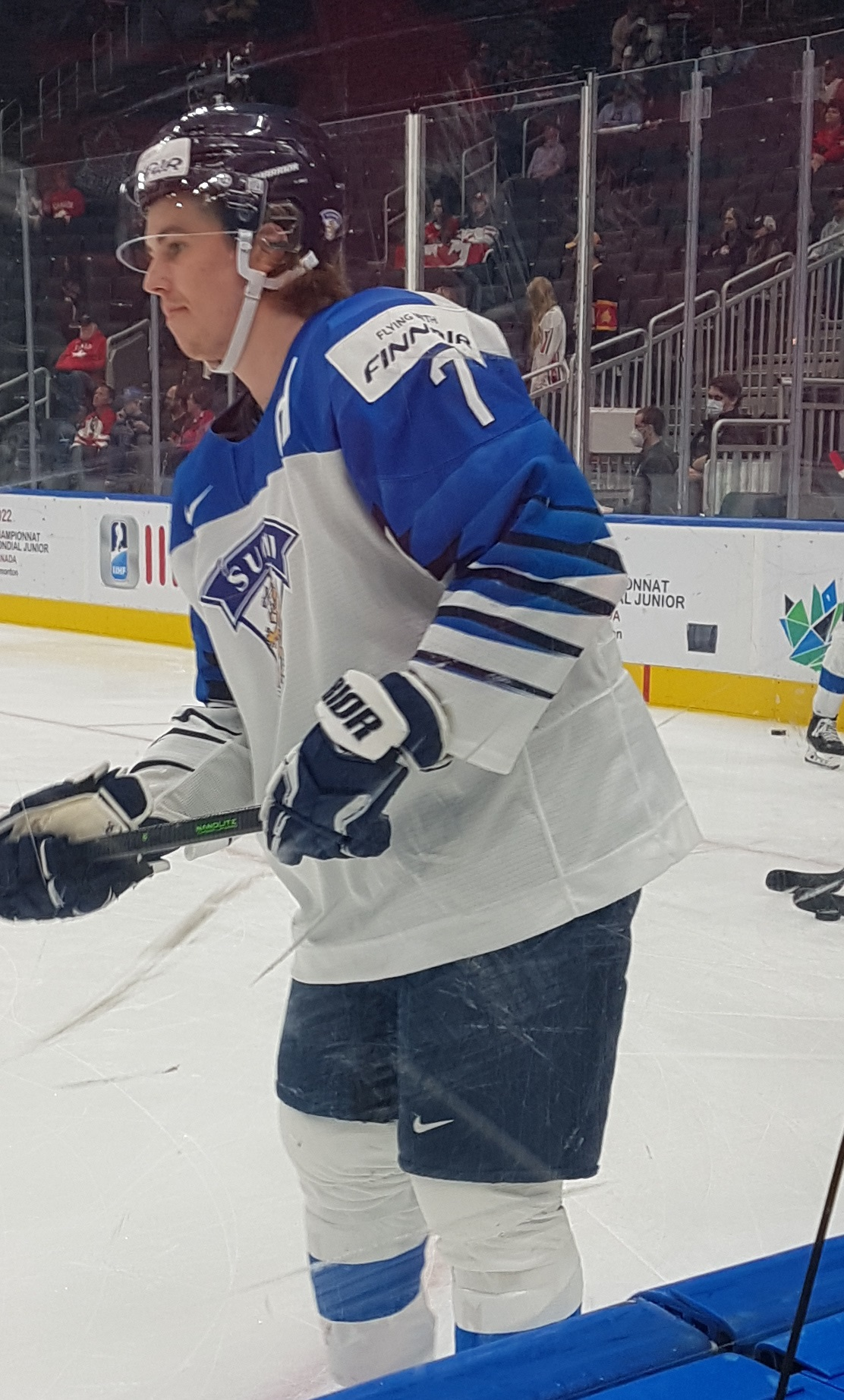
- Niemelä at the 2022 World Junior Ice Hockey Championships
- Born: 25 March 2002 (age 24) Oulu, Finland
- Height: 6 ft 0 in (183 cm)
- Weight: 181 lb (82 kg; 12 st 13 lb)
- Position: Defence
- Shoots: Right
- SHL team Former teams: Malmö Redhawks; Oulun Kärpät
- NHL draft: 64th overall, 2020; Toronto Maple Leafs
- Playing career: 2019–present

Topi Niemelä (born 25 March 2002) is a Finnish professional ice hockey defenceman currently playing for the Malmö Redhawks of the Swedish Hockey League (SHL). Niemelä was drafted 64th overall by the Maple Leafs in the 2020 NHL entry draft, ranking within the top ten of European skaters.

== Playing career ==
Following a breakout year in the Liiga with Oulun Kärpät during 2021–22 season, Niemelä was signed to a future three-year, entry-level contract with draft club, the Toronto Maple Leafs, on 13 May 2022. Niemelä returned to Oulun Kärpät for the 2022–23 season and appeared in 58 games, scoring 8 goals and 18 points. At the end of the season, he joined the Maple Leafs' American Hockey League (AHL) affiliate, the Toronto Marlies. Niemelä attended the Maple Leafs' 2023 training camp, but was assigned to the Marlies to start the 2023–24 season.

As a pending restricted free agent after his entry-level contract with the Maple Leafs, Niemelä opted to pause his career in North America and was signed to a one-year contract with Swedish club, Malmö Redhawks of the SHL, on 23 June 2025.

== International play ==
Medal record

Representing Finland

Ice hockey

World Junior Championships
Silver medal – second place	2022 Canada	
Bronze medal – third place	2021 Canada	

At the 2021 World Junior Ice Hockey Championships, Niemelä led all defensemen in points, accumulating two goals and six assists on the way to winning the bronze medal with Team Finland. After the end of the tournament, he was named Best Defenceman by the IIHF Directorate. He joined Team Finland again for the 2022 edition of the tournament. The team reached the gold medal game this time, playing against Team Canada, and Niemelä played a pivotal role in the game's most famous moment, when his potentially game-winning shot into a wide open Canadian net was knocked out of midair by Canadian captain Mason McTavish, preventing Finnish victory. The Finns won the silver medal.

== Career statistics ==
=== Regular season and playoffs ===
			Regular season					Playoffs
Season	Team	League	GP	G	A	Pts	PIM	GP	G	A	Pts	PIM
2018–19	Oulun Kärpät	Jr. A	39	1	7	8	16	11	1	3	4	2
2019–20	Oulun Kärpät	Liiga	43	1	6	7	8	—	—	—	—	—
2019–20	Oulun Kärpät	Jr. A	1	0	1	1	0	1	0	0	0	0
2020–21	Oulun Kärpät	Liiga	15	0	4	4	2	4	0	2	2	0
2020–21	Oulun Kärpät	Jr. A	6	1	3	4	0	—	—	—	—	—
2021–22	Oulun Kärpät	Liiga	48	10	22	32	20	6	0	1	1	2
2022–23	Oulun Kärpät	Liiga	58	8	10	18	12	3	0	0	0	4
2022–23	Toronto Marlies	AHL	6	1	1	2	0	7	2	3	5	2
2023–24	Toronto Marlies	AHL	68	8	31	39	43	3	0	0	0	2
2024–25	Toronto Marlies	AHL	61	2	20	22	18	2	0	2	2	0
Liiga totals			164	19	42	61	42	13	0	3	3	6

=== International ===
Year	Team	Event	GP	G	A	Pts	PIM
2018	Finland	U17	6	1	0	1	2
2019	Finland	U18	5	1	0	1	0
2019	Finland	HG18	3	0	3	3	0
2021	Finland	WJC	7	2	6	8	6
2022	Finland	WJC	7	0	6	6	2
Junior totals			28	4	15	19	10
