= Daniel Ljungman =

Swedish ice hockey player (born 2002)

- Born: 3 April 2002 (age 24) Uppsala, Sweden
- Height: 6 ft 0 in (183 cm)
- Weight: 176 lb (80 kg; 12 st 8 lb)
- Position: Right wing
- Shoots: Left
- Allsv team Former teams: AIK; Linköping HC; Rögle BK
- NHL draft: 154th overall, 2020; Dallas Stars
- Playing career: 2020–present

Daniel Ljungman (born 3 April 2002) is a Swedish professional ice hockey right wing for AIK of the HockeyAllsvenskan (Allsv).

== Playing career ==
Ljungman made his professional debut during the 2020–21 season where he recorded two goals and two assists in 42 games for Linköping HC. He was drafted in the fifth round, 154th overall, by the Dallas Stars in the 2020 NHL entry draft.

Ahead of the 2022–23 SHL season, Ljungman signed a two-year contract with Rögle BK.

On 9 April 2024, Ljungman agreed as a free agent to a two-year contract with AIK IF of the Allsvenskan.

== International play ==
Medal record

Representing Sweden

Ice hockey

World Junior Championships
Bronze medal – third place	2022 Canada	

Ljungman represented Sweden at the 2022 World Junior Ice Hockey Championships and won a bronze medal.

== Career statistics ==
=== Regular season and playoffs ===
			Regular season					Playoffs
Season	Team	League	GP	G	A	Pts	PIM	GP	G	A	Pts	PIM
2018–19	Linköpings HC	J20	7	0	0	0	0	—	—	—	—	—
2019–20	Linköping HC	J20	40	10	13	23	6	—	—	—	—	—
2020–21	Linköping HC	J20	12	12	5	17	6	—	—	—	—	—
2020–21	Linköping HC	SHL	42	2	2	4	8	—	—	—	—	—
2021–22	Linköping HC	J20	2	0	4	4	2	4	0	2	2	4
2021–22	Linköping HC	SHL	27	2	1	3	4	—	—	—	—	—
2021–22	Södertälje SK	Allsv	21	3	3	6	4	—	—	—	—	—
2022–23	Rögle BK	SHL	3	0	0	0	0	1	0	0	0	0
2022–23	Kristianstads IK	Allsv	48	4	7	11	14	—	—	—	—	—
2023–24	Nybro Vikings	Allsv	50	13	15	28	16	6	1	1	2	0
2024–25	AIK	Allsv	24	7	5	12	6	18	3	3	6	10
SHL totals			72	4	3	7	12	1	0	0	0	0

=== International ===
Year	Team	Event	Result	GP	G	A	Pts	PIM
2018	Sweden	U17	3rd place, bronze medalist(s)	6	2	1	3	2
2019	Sweden	HG18	3rd place, bronze medalist(s)	5	4	1	5	2
2022	Sweden	WJC	3rd place, bronze medalist(s)	7	2	2	4	0
Junior totals				18	8	4	12	4
