= Roni Sevänen =

Finnish ice hockey defenceman

- Born: April 17, 1995 (age 30) Eura, Finland
- Height: 6 ft 0 in (183 cm)
- Weight: 196 lb (89 kg; 14 st 0 lb)
- Position: Defenceman
- Shoots: Left
- Liiga team Former teams: HC TPS; Lukko; Porin Ässät
- Playing career: 2016–present

Roni Sevänen (born 17 April 1995) is a Finnish professional ice hockey defenceman who currently plays for TPS Turku in the Finnish Liiga.

== Playing career ==
On 11 June 2021, Sevänen as a free agent signed an initial one-year contract with Porin Ässät. He previously spent his first five seasons in the Liiga with Lukko.
