= 2026 Calder Cup playoffs =

American Hockey League postseason tournament

Tournament details
- Dates: April 21 – June 19, 2026
- Teams: 23

Final positions
- Champions: Toronto Marlies
- Runners-up: Chicago Wolves

Tournament statistics
- Scoring leader(s): Vinni Lettieri (Marlies) (26 points)

Awards
- MVP: Artur Akhtyamov (Marlies)

The 2026 Calder Cup playoffs was the postseason tournament of the American Hockey League (AHL) to determine the winner of the Calder Cup, which is awarded to the AHL playoff champions from the 2025–26 AHL season.

All teams except the bottom two teams of the Atlantic, North, and Central divisions, as well as the bottom three teams of the Pacific division qualified for the playoffs. Each division has a best-of-three series in the first round to determine the top 16 teams for the division semifinals, with various teams receiving byes based on regular season performance.

The 16 teams that remain—four from each division—will play a best-of-five series in the division semifinals, with the playoffs continuing with another best-of-five series for the division finals and a best-of-seven series for the conference finals and Calder Cup finals.

On June 19, 2026, the Toronto Marlies won their second Calder Cup after defeating the Chicago Wolves in five games.

== Playoff format ==
The AHL will continue to use the same playoff format used since 2022. The playoff field will include the top six finishers in the eight-team Atlantic Division, the top five finishers each in the seven-team North and Central Divisions, and the top seven teams in the 10-team Pacific Division. First-round match-ups will be best-of-three series; the two highest seeds in the Atlantic, the three highest seeds in each of the North and Central, and the first-place team in the Pacific will receive byes into the best-of-five Division Semifinals, with the first-round winners re-seeded in each division. The division finals will also be best-of-five series, followed by best-of-seven conference finals and a best-of-seven Calder Cup finals series.

== Bracket ==
First Round; April 21–26
A3	Charlotte	1
A6	Springfield	2
A4	Bridgeport	0
A5	Hershey	2
N4	Toronto	2
N5	Rochester	1
C4	Manitoba	2
C5	Milwaukee	1
P2	Colorado	2
P7	San Diego	0
P3	Henderson	2
P6	San Jose	0
P4	Coachella Valley	2
P5	Bakersfield	1

Division Semifinals; April 24 – May 9
A1	Providence	1
A6	Springfield	3
Atlantic Division
A2	Wilkes-Barre/Scranton	3
A5	Hershey	1
N1	Laval	2
N4	Toronto	3
North Division
N2	Syracuse	1
N3	Cleveland	3
C1	Grand Rapids	3
C4	Manitoba	1
Central Division
C2	Chicago	3
C3	Texas	2
P1	Ontario	2
P4	Coachella Valley	3
Pacific Division
P2	Colorado	3
P3	Henderson	1

Division Finals; May 12–24
A6	Springfield	2
A2	Wilkes-Barre/Scranton	3
Eastern Conference
N4	Toronto	3
N3	Cleveland	2
C1	Grand Rapids	1
C2	Chicago	3
Western Conference
P4	Coachella Valley	1
P2	Colorado	3

Conference Finals; May 27 – June 8
A2	Wilkes-Barre/Scranton	2
N4	Toronto	4
C2	Chicago	4
P2	Colorado	3

Calder Cup Finals; June 12–19
N4	Toronto	4
C2	Chicago	1

== First round ==
=== Eastern Conference first round ===
==== (A3) Charlotte Checkers vs. (A6) Springfield Thunderbirds ====
April 22	Springfield Thunderbirds	1–8	Charlotte Checkers	Bojangles Coliseum	Recap
No scoring		First period	5:05 – Marek Alscher (1); 13:07 – Noah Gregor (1); 17:01 – Nolan Foote (1); 19:21 – Noah Gregor (2)
No scoring		Second period	1:40 – Jack Studnicka (1); 3:37 – Sandis Vilmanis (1); 7:47 – Tobias Bjornfot (1)
Julien Gauthier (1) – 4:39		Third period	19:20 – Jack Studnicka (2)
Vadim Zherenko (11 saves / 15 shots); Will Cranley (19 saves / 23 shots)		Goalie stats	Cooper Black (18 saves / 19 shots)

April 24	Springfield Thunderbirds	5–2	Charlotte Checkers	Bojangles Coliseum	Recap
No scoring		First period	3:52 – Trevor Carrick (1)
Wyatt Newpower (1) – 7:57; Zach Dean (1) – 16:16; Chris Wagner (1) – pp – 17:05		Second period	8:49 – Ludvig Jansson (1)
Hugh McGing (1) – sh – 16:47; Chris Wagner (2) – en, sh – 17:28		Third period	No scoring
Georgi Romanov (29 saves / 31 shots)		Goalie stats	Cooper Black (18 saves / 22 shots)

April 25	Springfield Thunderbirds	2–1	OT	Charlotte Checkers	Bojangles Coliseum	Recap
No scoring		First period		Tobias Björnfot (2) – 5:58
No scoring		Second period		No scoring
Calle Rosén (1) – 5:45		Third period		No scoring
Julien Gauthier (2) – 14:50		First overtime period		No scoring
Georgi Romanov (34 saves / 35 shots)		Goalie stats		Cooper Black (22 saves / 24 shots)

Springfield won series 2–1

==== (A4) Bridgeport Islanders vs. (A5) Hershey Bears ====
April 21	Hershey Bears	2–0	Bridgeport Islanders	Total Mortgage Arena	Recap
No scoring		First period	No scoring
No scoring		Second period	No scoring
David Gucciardi (1) – 12:31; Ilya Protas (1) – en – 19:58		Third period	No scoring
Clay Stevenson (18 saves / 18 shots)		Goalie stats	Marcus Hogberg (21 saves / 22 shots)

April 23	Bridgeport Islanders	2–5	Hershey Bears	Giant Center	Recap
No scoring		First period	4:10 – Andrew Cristall (1)
Matt Luff (1) – pp – 1:07		Second period	10:55 – Sam Bitten (1); 12:44 – Andrew Cristall (2)
Calum Ritchie (1) – 9:57		Third period	17:57 – en – Sonny Milano (1); 18:26 – Bogdan Trineyev (1)
Marcus Hogberg (18 saves / 22 shots)		Goalie stats	Clay Stevenson (22 saves / 24 shots)

Hershey won series 2–0

==== (N4) Toronto Marlies vs. (N5) Rochester Americans ====
April 22	Rochester Americans	0–5	Toronto Marlies	Coca-Cola Coliseum	Recap
No scoring		First period	7:06 – Michael Pezzetta (1); 14:33 – Benoit-Olivier Groulx (1); 19:17 – pp – Vinni Lettieri (1)
No scoring		Second period	13:51 – Vinni Lettieri (2); 19:56 – pp – Vinni Lettieri (3)
No scoring		Third period	No scoring
Devon Levi (27 saves / 32 shots)		Goalie stats	Artur Akhtyamov (16 saves / 16 shots)

April 24	Toronto Marlies	0–4	Rochester Americans	Blue Cross Arena	Recap
No scoring		First period	13:20 – pp – Konsta Helenius (1); 16:58 – Carson Meyer (1)
No scoring		Second period	No scoring
No scoring		Third period	8:19 – Vsevolod Komarov (1); 18:54 – en – Ryan Johnson (1)
Artur Akhtyamov (20 saves / 23 shots)		Goalie stats	Devon Levi (29 saves / 29 shots)

April 26	Rochester Americans	2–4	Toronto Marlies	Coca-Cola Coliseum	Recap
No scoring		First period	2:12 – Ryan Tverberg (1)
Konsta Helenius (2) – 10:06; Olivier Nadeau (1) – pp – 16:24		Second period	4:47 – Logan Shaw (1); 14:30 – pp – Logan Shaw (2)
No scoring		Third period	18:30 – en – William Villeneuve (1)
Devon Levi (35 saves / 38 shots)		Goalie stats	Dennis Hildeby (29 saves / 31 shots)

Toronto won series 2–1

=== Western Conference first round ===
==== (C4) Manitoba Moose vs. (C5) Milwaukee Admirals ====
April 22	Milwaukee Admirals	4–1	Manitoba Moose	Canada Life Centre	Recap
Reid Schaefer (1) – 9:18; Brady Martin (1) – 12:09		First period	No scoring
Kevin Gravel (1) – 6:45		Second period	No scoring
Cole O'Hara (1) – en – 18:41		Third period	4:14 – Parker Ford (1)
Matt Murray (42 saves / 43 shots)		Goalie stats	Thomas Milic (20 saves / 23 shots)

April 24	Milwaukee Admirals	1–2	Manitoba Moose	Canada Life Centre	Recap
No scoring		First period	No scoring
Ryan Ufko (1) – sh – 1:42		Second period	3:53 – Parker Ford (2)
No scoring		Third period	19:17 – pp – David Gustafsson (1)
Matt Murray (33 saves / 35 shots)		Goalie stats	Domenic DiVincentiis (19 saves / 20 shots)

April 26	Milwaukee Admirals	1–2	Manitoba Moose	Canada Life Centre	Recap
No scoring		First period	11:43 – Walker Duehr (1)
No scoring		Second period	15:38 – Samuel Fagemo (1)
Jake Lucchini (1) – 16:16		Third period	No scoring
Matt Murray (28 saves / 30 shots)		Goalie stats	Domenic DiVincentiis (31 saves / 32 shots)

Manitoba won series 2–1

==== (P2) Colorado Eagles vs. (P7) San Diego Gulls ====
April 22	San Diego Gulls	0–3	Colorado Eagles	Blue Arena	Recap
No scoring		First period	14:07 – pp – T. J. Tynan (1)
No scoring		Second period	2:38 – Tristen Nielsen (1)
No scoring		Third period	19:10 – en – Taylor Makar (1)
Damian Clara (24 saves / 26 shots)		Goalie stats	Trent Miner (18 saves / 18 shots)

April 24	San Diego Gulls	1–6	Colorado Eagles	Blue Arena	Recap
Sasha Pastujov (1) – 10:44		First period	4:32 – Ronnie Attard (1); 11:51 – Jayson Megna (1)
No scoring		Second period	No scoring
No scoring		Third period	1:43 – Alex Gagne (1); 7:34 – pp – Matt DiMarsico (1); 12:10 – Sean Behrens (1); 16:08 – en – Ivan Ivan (1)
Damian Clara (26 saves / 31 shots)		Goalie stats	Trent Miner (26 saves / 27 shots)

Colorado won series 2–0

==== (P3) Henderson Silver Knights vs. (P6) San Jose Barracuda ====
April 22	San Jose Barracuda	4–5	OT	Henderson Silver Knights	Lee's Family Forum	Recap
Kasper Halttunen (1) – 5:43		First period		17:48 – pp – Lukas Cormier (1)
Jimmy Huntington (1) – 9:27; Colin White (1) – pp – 12:50		Second period		13:40 – Raphael Lavoie (1)
Igor Chernyshov (1) – pp – 10:41		Third period		5:27 – Jeremy Davies (1); 6:34 – Raphael Lavoie (2)
No scoring		First overtime period		0:38 – Trevor Connelly (1)
Laurent Brossoit (34 saves / 39 shots)		Goalie stats		Carl Lindbom (18 saves / 22 shots)

April 24	San Jose Barracuda	1–5	Henderson Silver Knights	Lee's Family Forum	Recap
No scoring		First period	7:56 – Braeden Bowman (1); 17:40 – pp – Raphael Lavoie (3)
Egor Afanasyev (1) – 18:54		Second period	2:07 – Alexander Holtz (1)
No scoring		Third period	17:02 – en – Jeremy Davies (2); 19:09 – en – Lucas Johansen (1)
Laurent Brossoit (27 saves / 30 shots)		Goalie stats	Carl Lindbom (26 saves / 27 shots)

Henderson won series 2–0

==== (P4) Coachella Valley Firebirds vs. (P5) Bakersfield Condors ====
April 23	Coachella Valley Firebirds	1–6	Bakersfield Condors	Dignity Health Arena	Recap
Ty Nelson (1) – 19:40		First period	4:10 – pp – Seth Griffith (1); 10:42 – Quinn Hutson (1)
No scoring		Second period	10:01 – Sam Poulin (1); 13:58 – Seth Griffith (2)
No scoring		Third period	3:23 – James Hamblin (1); 4:07 – Riley Stillman (1)
Nikke Kokko (17 saves / 23 shots); Victor Ostman (4 saves / 4 shots)		Goalie stats	Matt Tomkins (38 saves / 39 shots)

April 25	Bakersfield Condors	4–5	Coachella Valley Firebirds	Acrisure Arena	Recap
No scoring		First period	10:10 – pp – Eduard Šalé (1)
Alec Regula (1) – pp – 5:11		Second period	2:34 – pp – Jagger Firkus (1); 14:10 – Mitchell Stephens (1)
Quinn Hutson (2) – pp – 2:36; Atro Leppänen (1) – 11:25; Riley Stillman (2) – 12:03		Third period	6:21 – Oscar Fisker Mølgaard (1); 16:50 – Oscar Fisker Mølgaard (2)
Matt Tomkins (18 saves / 23 shots)		Goalie stats	Nikke Kokko (11 saves / 15 shots)

April 26	Bakersfield Condors	2–6	Coachella Valley Firebirds	Acrisure Arena	Recap
No scoring		First period	No scoring
No scoring		Second period	1:56 – pp – Jon-Randall Avon (1); 8:36 – Jagger Firkus (2); 13:02 – Jacob Melanson (1); 18:22 – Jani Nyman (1)
Damien Carfagna (1) – 2:14; Quinn Hutson (3) – pp – 8:18		Third period	16:50 – Logan Morrison (1); 17:24 – en – Oscar Fisker Mølgaard (3)
Matt Tomkins (21 saves / 26 shots)		Goalie stats	Nikke Kokko (31 saves / 33 shots)

Coachella Valley won series 2–1

== Division semifinals ==
=== Eastern Conference division semifinals ===
==== (A1) Providence Bruins vs. (A6) Springfield Thunderbirds ====
May 1	Springfield Thunderbirds	3–2	Providence Bruins	Amica Mutual Pavilion	Recap
Akil Thomas (1) – pp – 15:16		First period	3:12 – Drew Callin (1)
Thomas Bordeleau (1) – 3:40		Second period	No scoring
Dylan Peterson (1) – 3:21		Third period	19:23 – pp – Matěj Blümel (1)
Georgi Romanov (24 saves / 26 shots)		Goalie stats	Michael DiPietro (23 saves / 26 shots)

May 3	Springfield Thunderbirds	1–2	Providence Bruins	Amica Mutual Pavilion	Recap
Dillon Dubé (1) – pp – 11:30		First period	8:34 – Matěj Blümel (2); 14:02 – Georgii Merkulov (1)
No scoring		Second period	No scoring
No scoring		Third period	No scoring
Georgi Romanov (29 saves / 31 shots)		Goalie stats	Michael DiPietro (27 saves / 28 shots)

May 5	Providence Bruins	2–3	OT	Springfield Thunderbirds	MassMutual Center	Recap
Matt Poitras (1) – 17:27; Riley Tufte (1) – pp – 19:55		First period		16:43 – Calle Rosén (2)
No scoring		Second period		4:13 – Calle Rosén (3)
No scoring		Third period		No scoring
No scoring		First overtime period		3:45 – Zach Dean (2)
Michael DiPietro (31 saves / 34 shots)		Goalie stats		Georgi Romanov (33 saves / 35 shots)

May 7	Providence Bruins	0–1	OT	Springfield Thunderbirds	MassMutual Center	Recap
No scoring		First period		No scoring
No scoring		Second period		No scoring
No scoring		Third period		No scoring
No scoring		First overtime period		4:01 – Dillon Dubé (2)
Michael DiPietro (27 saves / 28 shots)		Goalie stats		Georgi Romanov (37 saves / 37 shots)

Springfield won series 3–1

==== (A2) Wilkes-Barre/Scranton Penguins vs. (A5) Hershey Bears ====
April 30	Hershey Bears	2–4	Wilkes-Barre/Scranton Penguins	Mohegan Arena at Casey Plaza	Recap
No scoring		First period	3:01 – Atley Calvert (1)
Ilya Protas (2) – 10:48		Second period	5:17 – Aidan McDonough (1); 9:32 – pp – Owen Pickering (1)
Henrik Rybinski (1) – 1:09		Third period	19:05 – en – Avery Hayes (1)
Clay Stevenson (27 saves / 30 shots)		Goalie stats	Sergei Murashov (31 saves / 33 shots)

May 2	Hershey Bears	2–1	Wilkes-Barre/Scranton Penguins	Mohegan Arena at Casey Plaza	Recap
Brett Leason (1) – pp – 16:25		First period	No scoring
Bogdan Trineyev (2) – 17:11		Second period	No scoring
No scoring		Third period	1:12 – Aidan McDonough (2)
Clay Stevenson (36 saves / 37 shots)		Goalie stats	Sergei Murashov (24 saves / 26 shots)

May 5	Wilkes-Barre/Scranton Penguins	4–3	OT	Hershey Bears	Giant Center	Recap
Philip Kemp (1) – 3:15; Mikhail Ilyin (1) – 6:16		First period		9:49 – Ivan Miroshnichenko (1); 18:09 – Bogdan Trineyev (3)
No scoring		Second period		0:37 – Brett Leason (2)
Avery Hayes (2) – 17:07		Third period		No scoring
Rutger McGroarty (1) – 5:02		First overtime period		No scoring
Sergei Murashov (26 saves / 29 shots)		Goalie stats		Clay Stevenson (23 saves / 27 shots)

May 7	Wilkes-Barre/Scranton Penguins	4–1	Hershey Bears	Giant Center	Recap
Joona Koppanen (1) – 1:15		First period	19:54 – pp – Ivan Miroshnichenko (2)
Harrison Brunicke (1) – sh – 6:20		Second period	No scoring
Ville Koivunen (1) – 3:33; Gabe Klassen (1) – en, sh – 19:29		Third period	No scoring
Sergei Murashov (37 saves / 38 shots)		Goalie stats	Clay Stevenson (26 saves / 29 shots)

Wilkes-Barre/Scranton won series 3–1

==== (N1) Laval Rocket vs. (N4) Toronto Marlies ====
April 29	Toronto Marlies	1–3	Laval Rocket	Place Bell	Recap
No scoring		First period	11:44 – Florian Xhekaj (1)
No scoring		Second period	No scoring
Cédric Paré (1) – 14:11		Third period	6:15 – Joshua Roy (1); 18:33 – en – Sammy Blais (1)
Dennis Hildeby (23 saves / 25 shots)		Goalie stats	Kaapo Kähkönen (20 saves / 21 shots)

May 1	Toronto Marlies	6–2	Laval Rocket	Place Bell	Recap
Logan Shaw (3) – pp – 13:08		First period	10:58 – Laurent Dauphin (1); 12:22 – pp – Joshua Roy (2)
Vinni Lettieri (4) – pp – 5:35; Luke Haymes (1) – pp – 18:09		Second period	No scoring
Easton Cowan (1) – 1:00; Cédric Paré (2) – en, sh – 16:01; Noah Chadwick (1) – pp – 18:18		Third period	No scoring
Artur Akhtyamov (29 saves / 31 shots)		Goalie stats	Kaapo Kähkönen (26 saves / 31 shots)

May 3	Laval Rocket	2–6	Toronto Marlies	Coca-Cola Coliseum	Recap
No scoring		First period	0:11 – pp – Logan Shaw (4); 5:35 – Easton Cowan (2); 7:58 – Henry Thrun (1); 15:33 – Alexander Nylander (1)
Alex Belzile (1) – 15:20		Second period	14:13 – Ryan Tverberg (2)
Owen Beck (1) – 11:02		Third period	14:35 – Cédric Paré (3)
Kaapo Kähkönen (8 saves / 12 shots); Hunter Shepard (10 saves / 12 shots)		Goalie stats	Artur Akhtyamov (26 saves / 28 shots)

May 5	Laval Rocket	4–0	Toronto Marlies	Coca-Cola Coliseum	Recap
Alex Belzile (2) – 0:46		First period	No scoring
Sammy Blais (2) – 6:32; Sammy Blais (3) – 14:16		Second period	No scoring
Laurent Dauphin (2) – sh – 2:36		Third period	No scoring
Kaapo Kähkönen (18 saves / 18 shots)		Goalie stats	Artur Akhtyamov (22 saves / 25 shots); Dennis Hildeby (6 saves / 7 shots)

May 9	Toronto Marlies	3–2	Laval Rocket	Place Bell	Recap
No scoring		First period	9:49 – Owen Beck (2)
Blake Smith (1) – 13:50		Second period	16:21 – pp – Owen Beck (3)
Reese Johnson (1) – 4:57; Vinni Lettieri (5) – 10:22		Third period	No scoring
Artur Akhtyamov (20 saves / 22 shots)		Goalie stats	Kaapo Kähkönen (16 saves / 19 shots)

Toronto won series 3–2

==== (N2) Syracuse Crunch vs. (N3) Cleveland Monsters ====
April 24	Syracuse Crunch	2–3	Cleveland Monsters	Rocket Arena	Recap
No scoring		First period	4:35 – Justin Pearson (1); 14:26 – Will Butcher (1); 18:20 – Corson Ceulemans (1)
Dylan Duke (1) – 1:51		Second period	No scoring
Mitchell Chaffee (1) – 4:02		Third period	No scoring
Jon Gillies (3 saves / 6 shots); Brandon Halverson (9 saves / 9 shots)		Goalie stats	Zach Sawchenko (29 saves / 31 shots)

April 26	Syracuse Crunch	4–1	Cleveland Monsters	Rocket Arena	Recap
Lucas Mercuri (1) – 3:52; Gabriel Szturc (1) – 10:18; Jakob Pelletier (1) – 11:07; Tommy Miller (1) – 13:15		First period	No scoring
No scoring		Second period	No scoring
No scoring		Third period	6:54 – Mikael Pyythiä (1)
Brandon Halverson (32 saves / 33 shots)		Goalie stats	Ivan Fedotov (2 saves / 6 shots); Evan Gardner (10 saves / 10 shots)

May 1	Cleveland Monsters	4–3	OT	Syracuse Crunch	Upstate Medical University Arena	Recap
No scoring		First period		10:08 – Spencer Kersten (1)
Riley Bezeau (1) – 0:08; Guillaume Richard (1) – 8:04		Second period		14:15 – Nick Abruzzese (1)
Guillaume Richard (2) – 9:04		Third period		3:06 – Ethan Gauthier (1)
Hudson Fasching (1) – 10:05		First overtime period		No scoring
Zach Sawchenko (31 saves / 34 shots)		Goalie stats		Brandon Halverson (28 saves / 32 shots)

May 3	Cleveland Monsters	2–1	3OT	Syracuse Crunch	Upstate Medical University Arena	Recap
No scoring		First period		6:21 – Matteo Pietroniro (1)
Luca Marrelli (1) – 14:15		Second period		No scoring
No scoring		Third period		No scoring
Zach Aston-Reese (1) – 7:53		Third overtime period		No scoring
Zach Sawchenko (46 saves / 47 shots)		Goalie stats		Brandon Halverson (56 saves / 58 shots)

Cleveland won series 3–1

=== Western Conference division semifinals ===
==== (C1) Grand Rapids Griffins vs. (C4) Manitoba Moose ====
May 2	Grand Rapids Griffins	0–1	Manitoba Moose	Canada Life Centre	Recap
No scoring		First period	No scoring
No scoring		Second period	No scoring
No scoring		Third period	17:34 – pp – Mason Shaw (1)
Michal Postava (22 saves / 23 shots)		Goalie stats	Domenic DiVincentiis (39 saves / 39 shots)

May 3	Grand Rapids Griffins	2–0	Manitoba Moose	Canada Life Centre	Recap
Michael Brandsegg-Nygård (1) – pp – 17:04		First period	No scoring
No scoring		Second period	No scoring
William Wallinder (1) – 14:48		Third period	No scoring
Michal Postava (30 saves / 30 shots)		Goalie stats	Domenic DiVincentiis (32 saves / 34 shots)

May 6	Manitoba Moose	2–4	Grand Rapids Griffins	Van Andel Arena	Recap
No scoring		First period	11:57 – Jakub Rychlovský (1)
Mason Shaw (2) – 19:22		Second period	4:41 – Erik Gustafsson (1); 17:00 – Carter Mazur (1)
Samuel Fagemo (2) – 16:48		Third period	19:14 – en – Carter Mazur (2)
Domenic DiVincentiis (28 saves / 31 shots)		Goalie stats	Michal Postava (15 saves / 17 shots)

May 8	Manitoba Moose	2–5	Grand Rapids Griffins	Van Andel Arena	Recap
No scoring		First period	4:40 – pp – Eduards Tralmaks (1)
Dylan Anhorn (1) – 3:04		Second period	14:50 – pp – Axel Sandin-Pellikka (1)
Phillip Di Giuseppe (1) – 15:16		Third period	1:37 – Michael Brandsegg-Nygård (2); 8:42 – pp – Carter Mazur (3); 16:57 – en – Carter Mazur (4)
Thomas Milic (21 saves / 25 shots)		Goalie stats	Michal Postava (19 saves / 21 shots)

Grand Rapids won series 3–1

==== (C2) Chicago Wolves vs. (C3) Texas Stars ====
April 28	Chicago Wolves	0–2	Texas Stars	H-E-B Center at Cedar Park	Recap
No scoring		First period	No scoring
No scoring		Second period	No scoring
No scoring		Third period	1:53 – pp – Artem Shlaine (1); 19:40 – en – Artem Shlaine (2)
Cayden Primeau (25 saves / 26 shots)		Goalie stats	Rémi Poirier (16 saves / 16 shots)

April 30	Chicago Wolves	5–4	OT	Texas Stars	H-E-B Center at Cedar Park	Recap
Juuso Välimäki (1) – pp – 9:30; Cal Foote (1) – 15:28		First period		0:44 – Matthew Seminoff (1); 13:26 – Michael Karow (1); 16:06 – Curtis McKenzie (1)
Noel Gunler (1) – 12:47; Juuso Välimäki (2) – 17:30		Second period		19:30 – Ellis Rickwood (1)
No scoring		Third period		No scoring
Domenick Fensore (1) – 10:27		First overtime period		No scoring
Cayden Primeau (25 saves / 29 shots)		Goalie stats		Rémi Poirier (26 saves / 31 shots)

May 2	Texas Stars	1–2	Chicago Wolves	Allstate Arena	Recap
No scoring		First period	5:08 – Noah Philp (1)
No scoring		Second period	19:34 – Ryan Suzuki (1)
Jack Becker (1) – 1:38		Third period	No scoring
Rémi Poirier (26 saves / 28 shots)		Goalie stats	Cayden Primeau (27 saves / 28 shots)

May 3	Texas Stars	5–4	OT	Chicago Wolves	Allstate Arena	Recap
Antonio Stranges (1) – 7:27; Cameron Hughes (1) – 10:46		First period		8:49 – pp – Bradly Nadeau (1); 13:42 – Evan Vierling (1)
No scoring		Second period		19:33 – Ivan Ryabkin (1)
Vladislav Kolyachonok (1) – 12:06; Kole Lind (1) – 19:49		Third period		2:19 – Noah Philp (2)
Artem Shlaine (3) – pp – 8:40		First overtime period		No scoring
Rémi Poirier (19 saves / 23 shots)		Goalie stats		Cayden Primeau (32 saves / 37 shots)

May 5	Texas Stars	1–6	Chicago Wolves	Allstate Arena	Recap
No scoring		First period	0:26 – Ryan Suzuki (2); 0:57 – Josiah Slavin (1)
Kole Lind (2) – 5:52		Second period	17:58 – Viktor Neuchev (1)
No scoring		Third period	2:10 – pp – Ryan Suzuki (3); 12:57 – en – Ryan Suzuki (4); 19:37 – en – Aleksi Heimosalmi (1)
Rémi Poirier (26 saves / 30 shots)		Goalie stats	Cayden Primeau (25 saves / 26 shots)

Chicago won series 3–2

==== (P1) Ontario Reign vs. (P4) Coachella Valley Firebirds ====
April 29	Coachella Valley Firebirds	3–0	Ontario Reign	Toyota Arena	Recap
No scoring		First period	No scoring
Jon-Randall Avon (2) – pp – 4:44		Second period	No scoring
Oscar Fisker Mølgaard (4) – 5:07; Jon-Randall Avon (3) – 11:12		Third period	No scoring
Nikke Kokko (23 saves / 23 shots)		Goalie stats	Erik Portillo (30 saves / 33 shots)

May 1	Coachella Valley Firebirds	1–5	Ontario Reign	Toyota Arena	Recap
Lleyton Roed (1) – 7:52		First period	18:45 – Logan Brown (1)
No scoring		Second period	15:17 – Glenn Gawdin (1)
No scoring		Third period	0:15 – Cole Guttman (1); 2:34 – sh – Francesco Pinelli (1); 16:41 – en – Martin Chromiak (1)
Nikke Kokko (19 saves / 23 shots)		Goalie stats	Pheonix Copley (34 saves / 35 shots)

May 5	Ontario Reign	2–1	Coachella Valley Firebirds	Acrisure Arena	Recap
No scoring		First period	16:50 – Jani Nyman (2)
No scoring		Second period	No scoring
Aatu Jämsen (1) – 5:56; Logan Brown (2) – 7:16		Third period	No scoring
Erik Portillo (27 saves / 28 shots)		Goalie stats	Nikke Kokko (22 saves / 24 shots)

May 7	Ontario Reign	2–6	Coachella Valley Firebirds	Acrisure Arena	Recap
Jack Hughes (1) – 14:02		First period	17:34 – pp – Jon-Randall Avon (4)
No scoring		Second period	14:09 – Mitchell Stephens (2); 18:35 – Kaden Hammell (1)
Nikita Alexandrov (1) – 15:17		Third period	3:50 – Lleyton Roed (2); 16:23 – en – Jagger Firkus (3); 16:40 – en – Oscar Fisker Mølgaard (5)
Pheonix Copley (27 saves / 31 shots)		Goalie stats	Nikke Kokko (26 saves / 28 shots)

May 9	Coachella Valley Firebirds	3–2	2OT	Ontario Reign	Toyota Arena	Recap
Jani Nyman (3) – 5:52		First period		No scoring
Oscar Fisker Mølgaard (6) – 9:31		Second period		2:43 – Jack Hughes (2)
No scoring		Third period		14:37 – Andre Lee (1)
Jon-Randall Avon (5) – 1:47		Second overtime period		No scoring
Nikke Kokko (34 saves / 36 shots)		Goalie stats		Erik Portillo (31 saves / 34 shots)

Coachella Valley won series 3–2

==== (P2) Colorado Eagles vs. (P3) Henderson Silver Knights ====
May 1	Colorado Eagles	1–0	Henderson Silver Knights	Lee's Family Forum	Recap
Alex Barré-Boulet (1) – pp – 17:40		First period	No scoring
No scoring		Second period	No scoring
No scoring		Third period	No scoring
Trent Miner (18 saves / 18 shots)		Goalie stats	Carl Lindbom (32 saves / 33 shots)

May 4	Colorado Eagles	3–4	2OT	Henderson Silver Knights	Lee's Family Forum	Recap
No scoring		First period		7:12 – Braeden Bowman (2)
T. J. Hughes (1) – 4:07; Alex Barré-Boulet (2) – 10:47		Second period		14:07 – Lukas Cormier (2)
T. J. Tynan (2) – 6:49		Third period		7:17 – Viliam Kmec (1)
No scoring		Second overtime period		1:51 – pp – Tanner Laczynski (1)
Trent Miner (38 saves / 42 shots)		Goalie stats		Carl Lindbom (36 saves / 39 shots)

May 6	Henderson Silver Knights	0–4	Colorado Eagles	Blue Arena	Recap
No scoring		First period	No scoring
No scoring		Second period	3:21 – Alex Gagne (2); 4:54 – Tye Felhaber (1); 13:46 – Tristen Nielsen (2)
No scoring		Third period	19:44 – en – Tristen Nielsen (3)
Carl Lindbom (23 saves / 26 shots)		Goalie stats	Trent Miner (20 saves / 20 shots)

May 9	Henderson Silver Knights	2–6	Colorado Eagles	Blue Arena	Recap
Jackson Hallum (1) – 2:21; Ben Hemmerling (1) – 16:10		First period	15:19 – pp – Gavin Brindley (1); 18:56 – Tristen Nielsen (4)
No scoring		Second period	6:36 – Chase Bradley (1)
No scoring		Third period	4:20 – pp – Alex Barré-Boulet (3); 16:00 – en – Keaton Middleton (1); 17:29 – Tristen Nielsen (5)
Carl Lindbom (32 saves / 36 shots)		Goalie stats	Trent Miner (21 saves / 23 shots)

Colorado won series 3–1

== Division finals ==
=== Eastern Conference division finals ===
==== (A2) Wilkes-Barre/Scranton Penguins vs. (A6) Springfield Thunderbirds ====
May 12	Springfield Thunderbirds	0–2	Wilkes-Barre/Scranton Penguins	Mohegan Arena at Casey Plaza	Recap
No scoring		First period	No scoring
No scoring		Second period	9:29 – Bill Zonnon (1)
No scoring		Third period	7:19 – Tanner Howe (1)
Georgi Romanov (23 saves / 25 shots)		Goalie stats	Sergei Murashov (24 saves / 24 shots)

May 14	Springfield Thunderbirds	4–3	OT	Wilkes-Barre/Scranton Penguins	Mohegan Arena at Casey Plaza	Recap
No scoring		First period		8:42 – pp – Bill Zonnon (2)
No scoring		Second period		0:16 – Tristan Broz (1); 18:16 – pp – Avery Hayes (3)
Hugh McGing (2) – sh – 0:55; Dillon Dubé (3) – 16:36; Dillon Dubé (4) – 18:10		Third period		No scoring
Akil Thomas (2) – 13:44		First overtime period		No scoring
Georgi Romanov (39 saves / 42 shots)		Goalie stats		Sergei Murashov (41 saves / 45 shots)

May 19	Wilkes-Barre/Scranton Penguins	2–1	Springfield Thunderbirds	MassMutual Center	Recap
Rutger McGroarty (2) – sh – 19:40		First period	No scoring
No scoring		Second period	No scoring
Bill Zonnon (3) – 5:58		Third period	16:21 – Juraj Pekarčík (1)
Sergei Murashov (27 saves / 28 shots)		Goalie stats	Georgi Romanov (30 saves / 32 shots)

May 21	Wilkes-Barre/Scranton Penguins	0–2	Springfield Thunderbirds	MassMutual Center	Recap
No scoring		First period	No scoring
No scoring		Second period	16:14 – pp – Dillon Dubé (5)
No scoring		Third period	6:48 – Marc-André Gaudet (1)
Sergei Murashov (30 saves / 32 shots)		Goalie stats	Georgi Romanov (20 saves / 20 shots)

May 23	Springfield Thunderbirds	1–8	Wilkes-Barre/Scranton Penguins	Mohegan Arena at Casey Plaza	Recap
No scoring		First period	3:56 – Tristan Broz (2); 7:43 – Harrison Brunicke (2); 16:17 – pp – Tristan Broz (3); 19:39 – Rafaël Harvey-Pinard (1)
No scoring		Second period	17:21 – Atley Calvert (2)
Akil Thomas (3) – 4:30		Third period	2:52 – pp – Ville Koivunen (2); 8:43 – en – Rafaël Harvey-Pinard (2); 10:42 – Ville Koivunen (3)
Georgi Romanov (8 saves / 12 shots); Vadim Zherenko (13 saves / 16 shots)		Goalie stats	Sergei Murashov (26 saves / 27 shots)

Wilkes-Barre/Scranton won series 3–2

==== (N3) Cleveland Monsters vs. (N4) Toronto Marlies ====
May 14	Toronto Marlies	5–2	Cleveland Monsters	Rocket Arena	Recap
No scoring		First period	4:56 – pp – Hudson Fasching (2)
Easton Cowan (3) – pp – 17:52; Marshall Rifai (1) – 19:53		Second period	7:37 – Hunter McKown (1)
Alexander Nylander (2) – 2:15; Ryan Tverberg (3) – 12:32; Benoit-Olivier Groulx (2) – en – 16:15		Third period	No scoring
Artur Akhtyamov (32 saves / 34 shots)		Goalie stats	Zach Sawchenko (11 saves / 15 shots)

May 16	Toronto Marlies	1–3	Cleveland Monsters	Rocket Arena	Recap
No scoring		First period	5:54 – Roman Ahcan (1); 18:53 – Mikael Pyyhtiä (2)
Benoit-Olivier Groulx (3) – sh – 15:32		Second period	No scoring
No scoring		Third period	12:54 – Luca Pinelli (1)
Artur Akhtyamov (21 saves / 24 shots)		Goalie stats	Zach Sawchenko (17 saves / 18 shots)

May 20	Cleveland Monsters	4–0	Toronto Marlies	Coca-Cola Coliseum	Recap
Owen Sillinger (1) – 4:57; Hudson Fasching (3) – pp – 17:20		First period	No scoring
No scoring		Second period	No scoring
Justin Pearson (2) – en – 16:50; Mikael Pyyhtiä (3) – en – 18:18		Third period	No scoring
Zach Sawchenko (16 saves / 16 shots)		Goalie stats	Artur Akhtyamov (26 saves / 28 shots)

May 22	Cleveland Monsters	2–5	Toronto Marlies	Coca-Cola Coliseum	Recap
No scoring		First period	13:28 – pp – Ryan Tverberg (4)
No scoring		Second period	17:47 – pp – Alexander Nylander (3)
Jack Williams (1) – 17:21; Luca Del Bel Belluz (1) – pp – 18:59		Third period	4:45 – Logan Shaw (5); 12:53 – Jacob Quillan (1); 18:22 – en – Ryan Tverberg (5)
Zach Sawchenko (21 saves / 25 shots)		Goalie stats	Artur Akhtyamov (36 saves / 38 shots)

May 24	Toronto Marlies	3–2	Cleveland Monsters	Rocket Arena	Recap
Vinni Lettieri (6) – 12:56		First period	6:31 – Zach Aston-Reese (2)
No scoring		Second period	15:03 – pp – Hudson Fasching (4)
Logan Shaw (6) – 15:30; Easton Cowan (4) – 19:48		Third period	No scoring
Artur Akhtyamov (22 saves / 24 shots)		Goalie stats	Zach Sawchenko (21 saves / 24 shots)

Toronto won series 3–2

=== Western Conference division finals ===
==== (C1) Grand Rapids Griffins vs. (C2) Chicago Wolves ====
May 14	Chicago Wolves	2–1	Grand Rapids Griffins	Van Andel Arena	Recap
No scoring		First period	No scoring
Justin Robidas (1) – pp – 18:38		Second period	14:41 – Eduards Tralmaks (2)
Josiah Slavin (2) – 6:48		Third period	No scoring
Cayden Primeau (23 saves / 24 shots)		Goalie stats	Michal Postava (30 saves / 32 shots)

May 16	Chicago Wolves	4–3	OT	Grand Rapids Griffins	Van Andel Arena	Recap
Felix Unger Sörum (1) – pp – 10:16		First period		2:42 – pp – Sheldon Dries (1); 4:08 – Michael Brandsegg-Nygård (3); 12:04 – pp – Eduards Tralmaks (3)
Ivan Ryabkin (2) – 16:47		Second period		No scoring
Cal Foote (2) – 13:56		Third period		No scoring
Felix Unger Sörum (2) – 5:14		First overtime period		No scoring
Cayden Primeau (36 saves / 39 shots)		Goalie stats		Michal Postava (25 saves / 29 shots)

May 19	Grand Rapids Griffins	4–3	OT	Chicago Wolves	Allstate Arena	Recap
Carter Mazur (5) – 1:13; John Leonard (1) – pp – 4:30		First period		5:40 – Domenick Fensore (2); 14:42 – pp – Justin Robidas (2)
Tyler Angle (1) – pp – 7:14		Second period		5:27 – pp – Felix Unger Sörum (3)
No scoring		Third period		No scoring
Michael Brandsegg-Nygård (4) – 9:22		First overtime period		No scoring
Michal Postava (17 saves / 20 shots)		Goalie stats		Cayden Primeau (42 saves / 46 shots)

May 21	Grand Rapids Griffins	2–3	Chicago Wolves	Allstate Arena	Recap
No scoring		First period	No scoring
No scoring		Second period	18:00 – Noah Philp (3)
Eduards Tralmaks (4) – 17:13; Sheldon Dries (2) – 19:45		Third period	4:02 – Noah Philp (4); 16:04 – Justin Robidas (3)
Michal Postava (18 saves / 21 shots)		Goalie stats	Cayden Primeau (33 saves / 35 shots)

Chicago won series 3–1

==== (P2) Colorado Eagles vs. (P4) Coachella Valley Firebirds ====
May 13	Colorado Eagles	3–0	Coachella Valley Firebirds	Acrisure Arena	Recap
No scoring		First period	No scoring
Ronnie Attard (2) – 6:40; T. J. Hughes (2) – 11:35		Second period	No scoring
Tye Felhaber (2) – en – 19:50		Third period	No scoring
Trent Miner (20 saves / 20 shots)		Goalie stats	Nikke Kokko (29 saves / 31 shots)

May 15	Colorado Eagles	0–4	Coachella Valley Firebirds	Acrisure Arena	Recap
No scoring		First period	No scoring
No scoring		Second period	No scoring
No scoring		Third period	1:20 – Jon-Randall Avon (6); 2:31 – Eduard Šalé (2); 16:05 – Jon-Randall Avon (7); 18:17 – en – Oscar Fisker Mølgaard (7)
Trent Miner (21 saves / 24 shots)		Goalie stats	Nikke Kokko (33 saves / 33 shots)

May 17	Coachella Valley Firebirds	1–4	Colorado Eagles	Blue Arena	Recap
Lleyton Roed (3) – sh – 14:46		First period	No scoring
No scoring		Second period	8:43 – Chase Bradley (2)
No scoring		Third period	0:33 – Chase Bradley (3); 4:28 – Gavin Brindley (2); 7:02 – T. J. Hughes (3)
Nikke Kokko (32 saves / 36 shots)		Goalie stats	Trent Miner (28 saves / 29 shots)

May 20	Coachella Valley Firebirds	2–3	Colorado Eagles	Blue Arena	Recap
Jagger Firkus (4) – 4:13		First period	No scoring
Ville Ottavainen (1) – 2:30		Second period	6:45 – Bryan Yoon (1); 8:57 – pp – Tristen Nielsen (6); 11:53 – Gavin Brindley (3)
No scoring		Third period	No scoring
Nikke Kokko (23 saves / 26 shots)		Goalie stats	Trent Miner (24 saves / 26 shots)

Colorado won series 3–1

== Conference finals ==
=== Eastern Conference final ===
==== (A2) Wilkes-Barre/Scranton Penguins vs. (N4) Toronto Marlies ====
May 27	Toronto Marlies	4–2	Wilkes-Barre/Scranton Penguins	Mohegan Arena at Casey Plaza	Recap
No scoring		First period	16:48 – Alexander Alexeyev (1)
Easton Cowan (5) – 1:38; William Villeneuve (2) – pp – 16:56		Second period	No scoring
Michael Pezzetta (2) – 18:24; Henry Thrun (2) – en – 19:12		Third period	6:01 – Rutger McGroarty (3)
Artur Akhtyamov (34 saves / 36 shots)		Goalie stats	Sergei Murashov (12 saves / 15 shots)

May 29	Toronto Marlies	2–1	OT	Wilkes-Barre/Scranton Penguins	Mohegan Arena at Casey Plaza	Recap
Alexander Nylander (4) – pp – 18:21		First period		No scoring
No scoring		Second period		No scoring
No scoring		Third period		8:01 – Tanner Howe (2)
Michael Pezzetta (3) – 14:53		First overtime period		No scoring
Artur Akhtyamov (33 saves / 34 shots)		Goalie stats		Sergei Murashov (37 saves / 39 shots)

June 1	Wilkes-Barre/Scranton Penguins	5–3	Toronto Marlies	Coca-Cola Coliseum	Recap
Aidan McDonough (3) – pp – 14:38		First period	12:15 – Vinni Lettieri (7)
Bill Zonnon (4) – 2:04		Second period	17:36 – Luke Haymes (2)
Ville Koivunen (4) – 7:48; Atley Calvert (3) – 10:03; Tanner Howe (3) – en – 19:24		Third period	19:08 – Marc Johnstone (1)
Sergei Murashov (36 saves / 39 shots)		Goalie stats	Artur Akhtyamov (29 saves / 33 shots)

June 3	Wilkes-Barre/Scranton Penguins	4–3	Toronto Marlies	Coca-Cola Coliseum	Recap
No scoring		First period	4:19 – sh – Benoit-Olivier Groulx (4); 14:14 – pp – Vinni Lettieri (8)
Scooter Brickey (1) – 3:14; Chase Pietila (1) – 9:00; Gabe Klassen (2) – 19:09		Second period	No scoring
Rutger McGroarty (4) – 17:01		Third period	13:04 – pp – Luke Haymes (3)
Sergei Murashov (32 saves / 35 shots)		Goalie stats	Artur Akhtyamov (23 saves / 27 shots)

June 5	Wilkes-Barre/Scranton Penguins	1–5	Toronto Marlies	Coca-Cola Coliseum	Recap
No scoring		First period	No scoring
Mikhail Ilyin (2) – pp – 6:22		Second period	7:11 – Landon Sim (1); 14:21 – pp – Benoit-Olivier Groulx (5)
No scoring		Third period	2:57 – Easton Cowan (6); 4:13 – Logan Shaw (7); 16:26 – sh, en – Marshall Rifai (2)
Sergei Murashov (28 saves / 32 shots)		Goalie stats	Artur Akhtyamov (32 saves / 33 shots)

June 7	Toronto Marlies	2–1	OT	Wilkes-Barre/Scranton Penguins	Mohegan Arena at Casey Plaza	Recap
No scoring		First period		6:26 – pp – Aidan McDonough (4)
Easton Cowan (7) – 9:11		Second period		No scoring
No scoring		Third period		No scoring
Alexander Nylander (5) – 13:44		First overtime period		No scoring
Artur Akhtyamov (39 saves / 40 shots)		Goalie stats		Sergei Murashov (37 saves / 39 shots)

Toronto won series 4–2

=== Western Conference final ===
==== (P2) Colorado Eagles vs. (C2) Chicago Wolves ====
May 28	Chicago Wolves	3–2	Colorado Eagles	Blue Arena	Recap
Justin Robidas (4) – pp – 5:39		First period	17:38 – pp – Alex Barré-Boulet (4)
Bradly Nadeau (2) – pp – 7:12; Noel Gunler (2) – pp – 12:54		Second period	0:33 – pp – Tristen Nielsen (7)
No scoring		Third period	No scoring
Cayden Primeau (35 saves / 37 shots)		Goalie stats	Trent Miner (16 saves / 19 shots)

May 30	Chicago Wolves	2–5	Colorado Eagles	Blue Arena	Recap
No scoring		First period	18:15 – pp – Tristen Nielsen (8)
Joel Nyström (1) – 2:07; Ivan Ryabkin (3) – 6:06		Second period	No scoring
No scoring		Third period	15:00 – Jacob MacDonald (1); 15:52 – pp – T. J. Hughes (4); 18:50 – en – Jason Polin (1); 19:44 – en – Ivan Ivan (2)
Cayden Primeau (25 saves / 28 shots)		Goalie stats	Trent Miner (13 saves / 15 shots)

June 2	Colorado Eagles	3–2	Chicago Wolves	Allstate Arena	Recap
Chase Bradley (4) – 9:45		First period	No scoring
Tye Felhaber (3) – 17:14		Second period	No scoring
Ivan Ivan (3) – 19:09		Third period	0:31 – sh – Domenick Fensore (3); 9:06 – Cal Foote (3)
Trent Miner (28 saves / 30 shots)		Goalie stats	Cayden Primeau (36 saves / 39 shots)

June 3	Colorado Eagles	1–2	Chicago Wolves	Allstate Arena	Recap
No scoring		First period	No scoring
No scoring		Second period	10:52 – sh – Justin Robidas (5)
Alex Barré-Boulet (5) – 11:21		Third period	1:21 – Bradly Nadeau (3)
Trent Miner (27 saves / 29 shots)		Goalie stats	Cayden Primeau (33 saves / 34 shots)

June 5	Colorado Eagles	7–3	Chicago Wolves	Allstate Arena	Recap
Tristen Nielsen (9) – 11:13; Tristen Nielsen (10) – pp – 17:08		First period	4:03 – Skyler Brind'Amour (1); 9:51 – pp – Justin Robidas (6)
Matt DiMarsico (2) – 3:32; Taylor Makar (2) – sh – 5:46; Chase Bradley (5) – 6:30		Second period	3:00 – Bradly Nadeau (4)
Alex Gagne (3) – 8:12; Jason Polin (2) – en – 15:30		Third period	No scoring
Trent Miner (26 saves / 29 shots)		Goalie stats	Cayden Primeau (20 saves / 26 shots); Amir Miftakhov (4 saves / 4 shots)

June 7	Chicago Wolves	3–2	Colorado Eagles	Blue Arena	Recap
No scoring		First period	6:09 – pp – Jack Ahcan (1); 19:14 – Valtteri Puustinen (1)
Juuso Välimäki (3) – pp – 2:07		Second period	No scoring
Joel Nyström (2) – 12:57; Ronan Seeley (1) – 15:46		Third period	No scoring
Amir Miftakhov (36 saves / 38 shots)		Goalie stats	Trent Miner (23 saves / 26 shots)

June 8	Chicago Wolves	4–3	Colorado Eagles	Blue Arena	Recap
Noah Philp (5) – pp – 19:45		First period	No scoring
Bradly Nadeau (5) – 1:07		Second period	1:47 – Wyatt Aamodt (1)
Ryan Suzuki (5) – 3:46; Ivan Ryabkin (4) – 12:50		Third period	0:14 – Jason Polin (3); 18:50 – Jayson Megna (2)
Amir Miftakhov (39 saves / 42 shots)		Goalie stats	Trent Miner (25 saves / 29 shots)

Chicago won series 4–3

== Calder Cup final ==
=== (C2) Chicago Wolves vs. (N4) Toronto Marlies ===
June 12	Toronto Marlies	4–2	Chicago Wolves	Allstate Arena	Recap
Ben Danford (1) – 17:45		First period	11:24 – Bradly Nadeau (6)
Cédric Paré (4) – 19:10		Second period	14:13 – Skyler Brind'Amour (2)
Vinni Lettieri (9) – 11:32; Vinni Lettieri (10) – en – 19:51		Third period	No scoring
Artur Akhtyamov (26 saves / 28 shots)		Goalie stats	Amir Miftakhov (21 saves / 24 shots)

June 14	Toronto Marlies	5–4	OT	Chicago Wolves	Allstate Arena	Recap
Benoit-Olivier Groulx (6) – 11:17		First period		1:53 – Charles-Alexis Legault (1); 15:40 – pp – Noah Philp (6)
Alexander Nylander (6) – ps – 4:12; Logan Shaw (8) – 15:45		Second period		No scoring
Benoit-Olivier Groulx (7) – 13:20		Third period		8:33 – Juuso Välimäki (4); 19:43 – Juuso Välimäki (5)
Logan Shaw (9) – 3:46		First overtime period		No scoring
Artur Akhtyamov (28 saves / 32 shots)		Goalie stats		Cayden Primeau (27 saves / 32 shots)

June 16	Chicago Wolves	0–1	Toronto Marlies	Coca-Cola Coliseum	Recap
No scoring		First period	No scoring
No scoring		Second period	2:47 – Easton Cowan (8)
No scoring		Third period	No scoring
Cayden Primeau (27 saves / 28 shots)		Goalie stats	Artur Akhtyamov (24 saves / 24 shots)

June 18	Chicago Wolves	4–3	OT	Toronto Marlies	Coca-Cola Coliseum	Recap
Bradly Nadeau (7) – 0:28		First period		4:36 – pp – Jacob Quillan (2); 9:58 – Luke Haymes (4)
No scoring		Second period		17:59 – Ryan Tverberg (6)
Domenick Fensore (4) – 4:23; Justin Robidas (7) – 5:28		Third period		No scoring
Viktor Neuchev (2) – 3:18		First overtime period		No scoring
Cayden Primeau (33 saves / 36 shots)		Goalie stats		Artur Akhtyamov (22 saves / 26 shots)

June 19	Chicago Wolves	3–4	Toronto Marlies	Coca-Cola Coliseum	Recap
Felix Unger Sörum (4) – 8:09; Josiah Slavin (3) – 17:49		First period	19:32 – Landon Sim (2)
Felix Unger Sörum (5) – pp – 19:54		Second period	3:04 – pp – Benoit-Olivier Groulx (8); 15:26 – Jacob Quillan (3); 16:49 – pp – Vinni Lettieri (11)
No scoring		Third period	No scoring
Cayden Primeau (19 saves / 23 shots)		Goalie stats	Artur Akhtyamov (27 saves / 30 shots)

Toronto won series 4–1

== Playoff statistical leaders ==
=== Leading skaters ===
These are the top ten skaters based on points. If there is a tie in points, goals take precedence over assists. Updated following games played on June 19, 2026.

Player	Team	GP	G	A	Pts	PIM
Vinni Lettieri	Toronto Marlies	23	11	15	26	36
William Villeneuve	Toronto Marlies	24	2	21	23	34
Easton Cowan	Toronto Marlies	22	8	10	18	18
Ryan Suzuki	Chicago Wolves	21	5	13	18	20
Tristen Nielsen	Colorado Eagles	17	10	7	17	8
Logan Shaw	Toronto Marlies	24	9	8	17	28
Bradly Nadeau	Chicago Wolves	21	7	10	17	38
Justin Robidas	Chicago Wolves	21	7	9	16	12
Ivan Ivan	Colorado Eagles	17	3	12	15	2
Benoit-Olivier Groulx	Toronto Marlies	23	8	6	14	24

=== Leading goaltenders ===
This is a combined table of the top five goaltenders based on goals against average and the top five goaltenders based on save percentage with at least 60 minutes played. The table is initially sorted by goals against average, with the criterion for inclusion in bold. Updated following games played on June 12, 2026.

Player	Team	GP	W	L	SA	GA	GAA	SV%	SO	TOI
Domenic DiVincentiis	Manitoba Moose	5	3	2	156	7	**1.43**	**.955**	1	294:28
Brandon Halverson	Syracuse Crunch	4	1	2	132	7	**1.52**	**.947**	0	276:30
Matt Murray	Milwaukee Admirals	3	1	2	108	5	**1.68**	**.954**	0	178:38
Georgi Romanov	Springfield Thunderbirds	11	7	4	326	20	**1.84**	**.939**	2	651:50
Trent Miner	Colorado Eagles	17	11	6	424	32	**1.87**	.925	4	1028:31
Michael DiPietro	Providence Bruins	4	1	3	116	8	1.96	**.931**	0	244:25
Sergei Murashov	Wilkes-Barre/Scranton Penguins	15	8	7	481	33	2.11	**.931**	1	937:29
