= Vinni Lettieri =

American ice hockey player (born 1995)

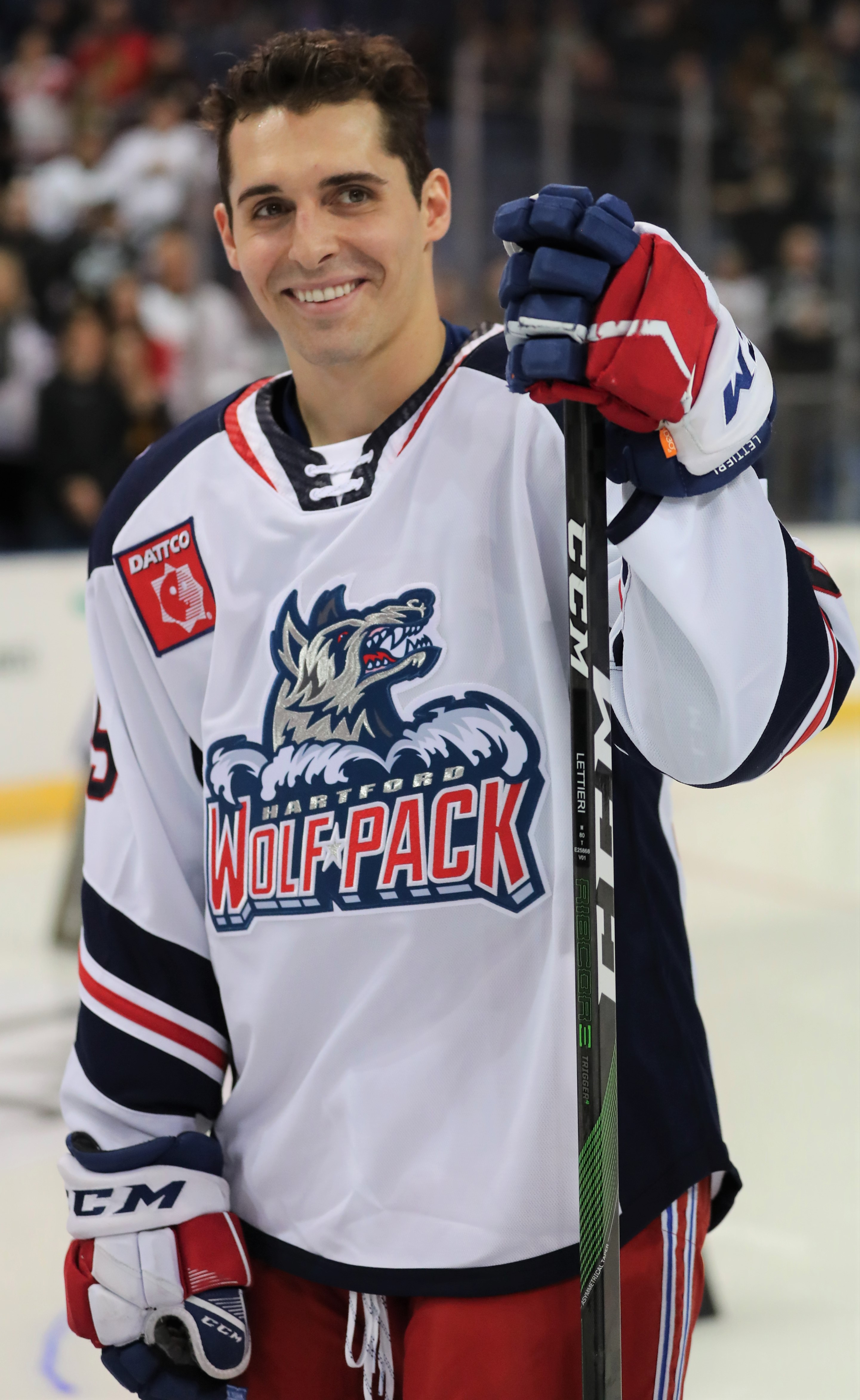
- Lettieri with the Hartford Wolf Pack in 2020
- Born: February 6, 1995 (age 31) Excelsior, Minnesota, U.S.
- Height: 5 ft 11 in (180 cm)
- Weight: 195 lb (88 kg; 13 st 13 lb)
- Position: Center
- Shoots: Right
- NHL team Former teams: Toronto Maple Leafs; New York Rangers; Anaheim Ducks; Boston Bruins; Minnesota Wild
- National team: United States
- NHL draft: Undrafted
- Playing career: 2017–present

Vinni Lettieri (born February 6, 1995) is an American professional ice hockey center for the Toronto Maple Leafs of the National Hockey League (NHL).

== Playing career ==
After playing two seasons with the Lincoln Stars in the USHL, Lettieri committed to the University of Minnesota. He played for the Minnesota Golden Gophers for four seasons and helped them win the Big Ten regular season title in four straight seasons.

=== Professional ===
==== New York Rangers ====
On March 27, 2017, Lettieri signed a two-year entry-level contract as a free agent with the New York Rangers of the National Hockey League (NHL). He was invited to the Rangers training camp before the 2017–18 season but was cut and sent to the Hartford Wolf Pack before the final roster was made. On December 29, 2017, Lettieri made his NHL debut in a 3–2 loss to the Detroit Red Wings, in which he scored his first NHL goal. He was recalled multiple times in January and February before finally being assigned back to the AHL on February 26 after playing in a total of 19 NHL games that season.

Lettieri spent the 2018–19 season rotating between the NHL and AHL getting called up for longer stints in the second half of the season. He finished the season with one goal and two assists. His lone goal came on a one-timer shot on March 25, 2019, against the Pittsburgh Penguins for his first career goal at Madison Square Garden.

==== Anaheim Ducks ====
After four seasons within the Rangers organization, Lettieri left as a free agent and signed a one-year, two-way contract with the Anaheim Ducks on October 10, 2020. On July 13, 2021, Lettieri was signed to a one-year, two-way contract extension by the Ducks.

==== Boston Bruins ====
On July 13, 2022, Lettieri was signed to a one-year, two-way contract by the Boston Bruins.

After impressive play for the Bruins AHL affiliate the Providence Bruins, Lettieri was named an AHL All-Star, representing the Atlantic Division. Later, Lettieri was called up to the NHL squad on January 26, 2023. However, he suffered an injury just one day later, causing him to be placed on IR. Once healed, Lettieri was then placed on waivers without having played a game for the Bruins, where he cleared. Towards the end of the 2022-23 season, with the Bruins comfortable in the standings, Lettieri was once again called up in order to rest key players. He played one game for the NHL squad before being sent back down.

==== Minnesota Wild ====
As a free agent from the Bruins, Lettieri returned to his home state in agreeing to a two-year, two-way contract with the Minnesota Wild on July 1, 2023.

Lettieri did not make the Wild's opening night roster to start the 2023-24 season, but he was called up shortly thereafter on October 23, 2023, and would play his first game in a Wild uniform the next night. Lettieri would score his first goal and point as a member of the Wild on November 7, 2023, in a 4-2 win over the New York Islanders. It was also his first goal at the NHL level since January 26, 2022, when he was still a member of the Ducks. Lettieri notched another goal and an assist before being sent back down to the AHL. After four games in the minors in which he score four points, Lettieri would be called back up to the NHL, where he would spend the rest of the season. Lettieri would score a goal in his first game back with Minnesota. For the rest of the season, Lettieri would serve as a depth forward for a mediocre Wild team. After a brief stint on the IL for almost all of January, Lettieri would be serviceable to the Wild, not providing wowing offense but also not being a liability. He would finish the season with five goals and four assists in 46 games.

==== Second Stint with the Bruins ====
On June 29, 2024, on the second day of the 2024 NHL entry draft, Lettieri was traded back to the Bruins alongside the 110th pick in the draft for Jakub Lauko and the 122nd pick.

Lettieri would spend the first half of the season with Providence Bruins in the AHL, serving as the alternate captain in his second stint with the team. Once again, Lettieri provided an offensive spark to the Bruins. Between December 7 and December 15, 2024, Lettieri scored nine assists in five games. He had 14 goals and 21 assists by the time of his first call up to the NHL club on January 13, 2025. He would score his first goal as a Bruin a couple days later in a 6-5 shootout against the Ottawa Senators. Lettieri would score one more goal in eight games before being sent back down to the AHL. After the NHL trade deadline, which saw the Bruins trade key pieces and turn to clock forward towards the next season, Lettieri was once again called up to the NHL squad, where he would spend the rest of the season. On March 30, 2025, Lettieri was placed on waivers by the Bruins, where he went unclaimed, and continued to remain with the NHL squad. Lettieri would finish out the season with the Bruins, totaling three goals and two assists for five points between his two stints with the club.

After the season was over, Lettieri was returned to Providence to help the team with their playoff run. Lettieri finished his AHL season with a career high in assists, 29, and was tied for first in goals, with 21. Lettieri once again showed his value to the AHL team, scoring two assists in a decisive Game 3 against the Springfield Thunderbirds to help the Bruins advance to the divisional round. The Bruins once again faced a decisive Game 5, this time against the Charlotte Checkers. Down 3-0 late in the third period, Lettieri almost single-handedly forced a Bruin comeback, scoring two goals to cut the lead to one. Unfortunately, Lettieri and the Bruins could not find the net for one more goal, and they were eliminated. With seven points, Lettieri led the Bruins in points during their playoff run.

==== Toronto Maple Leafs ====
Leaving the Bruins at the conclusion of his contract, Lettieri was signed to a one-year, $775,000 contract with the Toronto Maple Leafs for the 2025–26 season on July 2, 2025. Lettieri would not appear in any games with the Maple Leafs, but scored 14 goals and 28 assists in 55 games with their AHL affiliate, the Toronto Marlies. In the opening game of the 2026 Calder Cup playoffs, Lettieri would register a hat-trick and an assist. Lettieri and Marlies would push all the way towards the Calder Cup Finals, where they would defeat the Chicago Wolves in five games to win the Calder Cup. Lettieri scored 11 goals and 15 assists for 26 points during the playoff run, leading all skaters in playoff goals and points.

On July 3, 2026, Lettieri would re-up with the Maple Leafs on a one-year, two-way deal.

== Personal life ==
Lettieri's grandfather, Lou Nanne, played, coached and was the general manager of the Minnesota North Stars. His father, Tino, played professional soccer and international soccer for Canada, including at the 1986 World Cup. His uncle Marty Nanne was drafted 161st overall by the Chicago Blackhawks in the 1986 NHL entry draft and played in the International Hockey League (IHL) for three seasons. His cousins are also ice hockey players – Tyler Nanne was drafted 142nd overall by the New York Rangers in the 2014 NHL entry draft, while Louis Nanne was drafted 188th overall by the Minnesota Wild in the 2012 NHL entry draft.

== Career statistics ==
=== Regular season and playoffs ===
Bold indicates led league

			Regular season					Playoffs
Season	Team	League	GP	G	A	Pts	PIM	GP	G	A	Pts	PIM
2010–11	Minnetonka High School	MSHSL	25	15	22	37	12	2	2	1	3	2
2011–12	Minnetonka High School	MSHSL	25	22	36	58	24	3	1	1	2	0
2011–12	Lincoln Stars	USHL	15	4	4	8	14	7	0	1	1	0
2012–13	Lincoln Stars	USHL	61	28	28	56	35	5	1	2	3	0
2013–14	University of Minnesota	B1G	37	2	6	8	8	—	—	—	—	—
2014–15	University of Minnesota	B1G	37	9	3	12	14	—	—	—	—	—
2015–16	University of Minnesota	B1G	37	7	19	26	18	—	—	—	—	—
2016–17	University of Minnesota	B1G	38	19	18	37	36	—	—	—	—	—
2016–17	Hartford Wolf Pack	AHL	9	0	1	1	4	—	—	—	—	—
2017–18	Hartford Wolf Pack	AHL	55	23	13	36	31	—	—	—	—	—
2017–18	New York Rangers	NHL	19	1	4	5	0	—	—	—	—	—
2018–19	New York Rangers	NHL	27	1	2	3	14	—	—	—	—	—
2018–19	Hartford Wolf Pack	AHL	48	23	25	48	22	—	—	—	—	—
2019–20	Hartford Wolf Pack	AHL	61	25	22	47	46	—	—	—	—	—
2020–21	Anaheim Ducks	NHL	5	0	0	0	0	—	—	—	—	—
2020–21	San Diego Gulls	AHL	22	14	12	26	12	3	1	2	3	4
2021–22	San Diego Gulls	AHL	24	8	14	22	8	—	—	—	—	—
2021–22	Anaheim Ducks	NHL	31	5	5	10	6	—	—	—	—	—
2022–23	Providence Bruins	AHL	48	23	26	49	34	4	1	0	1	6
2022–23	Boston Bruins	NHL	1	0	0	0	0	—	—	—	—	—
2023–24	Iowa Wild	AHL	10	4	4	8	4	—	—	—	—	—
2023–24	Minnesota Wild	NHL	46	5	4	9	24	—	—	—	—	—
2024–25	Providence Bruins	AHL	46	20	28	48	20	8	3	4	7	8
2024–25	Boston Bruins	NHL	26	3	2	5	6	—	—	—	—	—
2025–26	Toronto Marlies	AHL	55	14	28	42	32	23	**11**	15	**26**	36
NHL totals			155	15	17	32	50	—	—	—	—	—

=== International ===
Year	Team	Event	Result	GP	G	A	Pts	PIM
2012	United States	IH18	7th	4	2	2	4	6
2022	United States	WC	4th	10	0	0	0	4
Junior totals				4	2	2	4	6
Senior totals				10	0	0	0	4

== Awards and honors ==
Award	Year	Ref.
USHL
USHL/NHL Top Prospects Game	2013	
All-Rookie Team	2013	
College
B1G Honorable Mention All-Star Team	2017	
B1G Sportsmanship Award	2017	
AHL
AHL All Star	2020, 2023	
Calder Cup champion	2026	
