= Michael Pezzetta =

Canadian ice hockey player (born 1998)

- Born: March 13, 1998 (age 28) Toronto, Ontario, Canada
- Height: 6 ft 1 in (185 cm)
- Weight: 219 lb (99 kg; 15 st 9 lb)
- Position: Left wing
- Shoots: Left
- NHL team (P) Cur. team Former teams: Toronto Maple Leafs; Toronto Marlies (AHL); Montreal Canadiens
- NHL draft: 160th overall, 2016; Montreal Canadiens
- Playing career: 2018–present

Michael Pezzetta (born March 13, 1998) is a Canadian professional ice hockey winger for the Toronto Marlies of the American Hockey League (AHL) while under contract to the Toronto Maple Leafs of the National Hockey League (NHL). He was selected in the sixth round, 160th overall, by the Montreal Canadiens in the 2016 NHL entry draft.

== Playing career ==
=== Early years ===
As a youth, Pezzetta played with both the Toronto Nationals and Mississauga Senators of the Greater Toronto Hockey League (GTHL) and participated with the latter at the annual OHL Cup during his midget year.

=== Junior ===
Originally selected 11th overall by the Sudbury Wolves in the 2014 Ontario Hockey League (OHL) Priority Selection draft, Pezzetta made his OHL debut during the 2014–15 season. During his overage season with Sudbury, he would be named as team captain prior to being traded to the Sarnia Sting on January 9, 2018.

=== Professional ===
Following his OHL career, Pezzetta signed a three-year, entry-level contract in March 2018 with the Montreal Canadiens, the team that selected him during the sixth round (160th overall) of the 2016 NHL entry draft. Thereafter, he would make his professional debut during the 2018–19 season with the Canadiens' American Hockey League (AHL) affiliate, the Laval Rocket.

During the 2021–22 season, Pezzetta was recalled by the Canadiens and made his NHL debut versus the Detroit Red Wings on November 2, 2021. In his rookie season with the Canadiens, he collected five goals and six assists across 51 games played, and led the team in penalty minutes (PIM) with 81. In the midst of a terrible season for the team overall, Pezzetta endeared himself to many fans with his passionate style of play.

In advance of the 2022–23 season, he signed a one-year, $750,000 deal to remain with the Canadiens organization. Initially seeing limited ice time as the team's thirteenth forward, a spate of injuries eventually moved him regularly into the lineup. Appearing in 63 games, Pezzetta managed seven goals and eight assists, while leading the team in hits (239) and total PIM amongst team forwards. In a March 27, 2023 game against the Buffalo Sabres, he drew headlines for scoring the shootout-winning goal and then celebrating in the style made famous by notable NHL enforcer, Tiger Williams.

On June 2, 2023, Pezzetta was signed to a two-year extension with the Canadiens. He expressed enthusiasm for the organization, saying "there's so much history and the fans are wild and it's such a loud and just fun atmosphere to be a part of. You want to stick around in this atmosphere for as long as you can." On April 12, 2025, Pezzetta skated in his 200th career NHL game.

Entering the offseason as an unrestricted free agent, Pezzetta agreed to a two-year contract with the Toronto Maple Leafs on July 1, 2025. After being placed on waivers ahead of the 2025–26 season, he joined the Leafs' AHL affiliate Toronto Marlies. On March 12, 2026, Pezzetta was recalled by the Maple Leafs and subsequently made his team debut that night against the Anaheim Ducks. Appearing in a total of nine scoreless NHL games, he was returned the AHL ranks prior to the beginning of the annual Calder Cup playoffs in mid-April. On June 19, 2026, Pezzetta and the Marlies captured the second Calder Cup in franchise history after defeating the Chicago Wolves in five games.

== International play ==
Internationally, Pezzetta represented Hockey Canada as part of team Canada White at the 2014 World U-17 Hockey Challenge, where his team ultimately finished in fifth place.

== Personal life ==
Pezzetta was born to parents Laurie and Lino, the latter of whom worked as a fire captain for Toronto Fire Services. He has one sibling, a brother named Stefano. The family is of Italian ancestry. Growing up, Pezzetta was a fan of his hometown Toronto Maple Leafs, idolizing players like Mats Sundin and Curtis Joseph. As a youth, he wore #13 in honour of Sundin.

He is an avid collector of cowboy hats.

== Career statistics ==
=== Regular season and playoffs ===
			Regular season					Playoffs
Season	Team	League	GP	G	A	Pts	PIM	GP	G	A	Pts	PIM
2013–14	Mississauga Senators	GTHL	29	11	15	26	32	10	4	7	11	18
2014–15	Sudbury Wolves	OHL	61	5	7	12	56	—	—	—	—	—
2015–16	Sudbury Wolves	OHL	64	10	18	28	98	—	—	—	—	—
2016–17	Sudbury Wolves	OHL	54	10	9	19	88	5	2	0	2	17
2017–18	Sudbury Wolves	OHL	35	15	16	31	53	—	—	—	—	—
2017–18	Sarnia Sting	OHL	27	8	13	21	26	12	1	1	2	15
2018–19	Laval Rocket	AHL	55	6	4	10	77	—	—	—	—	—
2018–19	Maine Mariners	ECHL	3	0	0	0	6	—	—	—	—	—
2019–20	Laval Rocket	AHL	32	2	2	4	63	—	—	—	—	—
2020–21	Laval Rocket	AHL	20	2	3	5	30	—	—	—	—	—
2021–22	Laval Rocket	AHL	8	3	3	6	16	—	—	—	—	—
2021–22	Montreal Canadiens	NHL	51	5	6	11	81	—	—	—	—	—
2022–23	Montreal Canadiens	NHL	63	7	8	15	77	—	—	—	—	—
2023–24	Montreal Canadiens	NHL	61	3	9	12	59	—	—	—	—	—
2024–25	Montreal Canadiens	NHL	25	0	0	0	24	—	—	—	—	—
2025–26	Toronto Marlies	AHL	39	5	6	11	52	23	3	2	5	82
2025–26	Toronto Maple Leafs	NHL	9	0	0	0	35	—	—	—	—	—
NHL totals			209	15	23	38	276	—	—	—	—	—

=== International ===
Year	Team	Event	Result	GP	G	A	Pts	PIM
2014	Canada White	U17	5th	5	0	2	2	2
Junior totals				5	0	2	2	2

== Awards and honours ==
Award	Year	Ref
GTHL
Top Prospects Game	2014	
OHL
OHL Scholastic Team	2015, 2016	
AHL
Calder Cup champion	2026	
