= Nikke Kokko =

Finnish ice hockey player (born 2004)

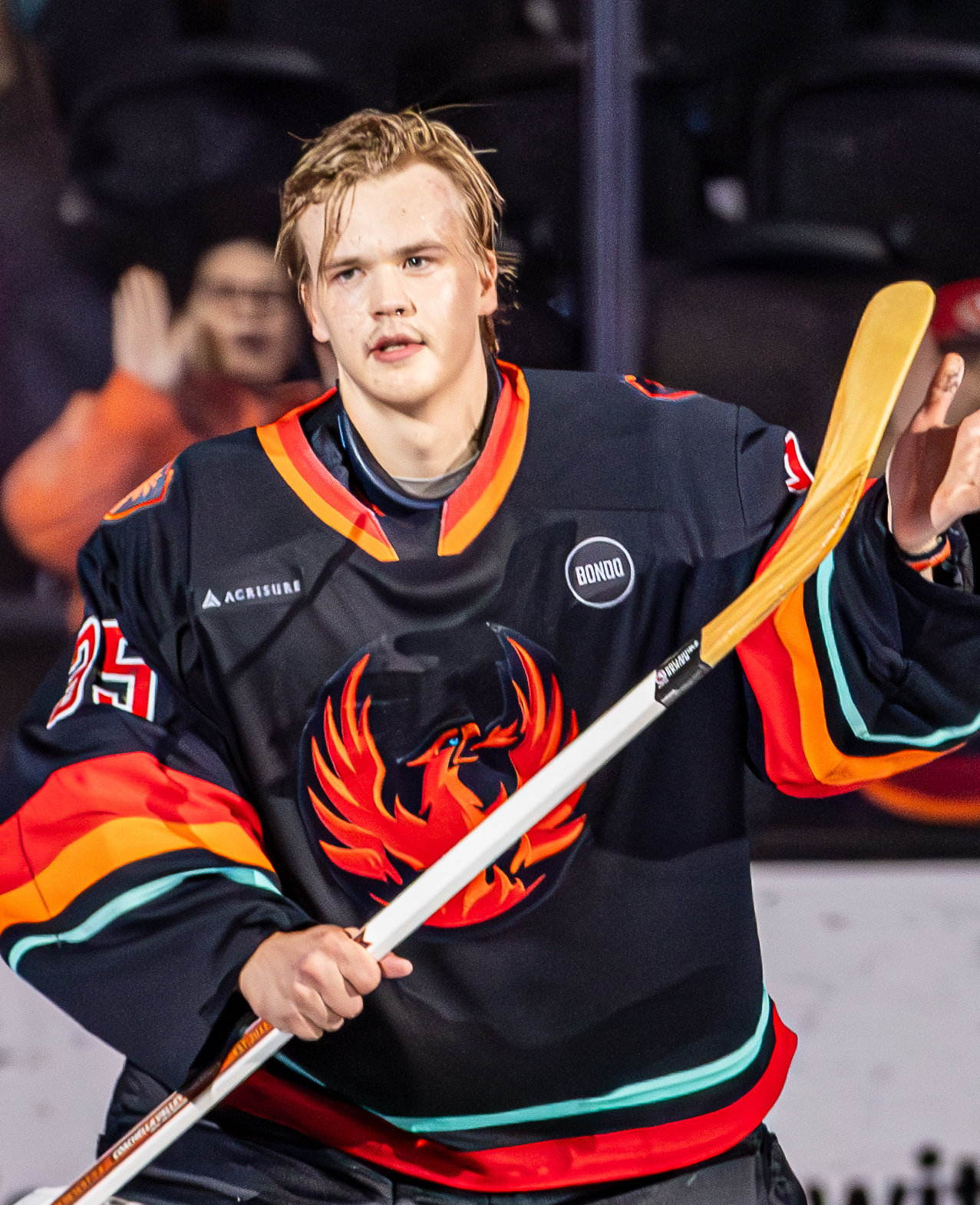
- Kokko with the Coachella Valley Firebirds in 2025
- Born: 14 March 2004 (age 22) Oulu, Finland
- Height: 6 ft 4 in (193 cm)
- Weight: 190 lb (86 kg; 13 st 8 lb)
- Position: Goaltender
- Catches: Left
- NHL team (P) Cur. team Former teams: Seattle Kraken; Coachella Valley Firebirds (AHL); Oulun Kärpät; SaiPa; Lahti Pelicans
- NHL draft: 58th overall, 2022; Seattle Kraken
- Playing career: 2021–present

Niklas "Nikke" Kokko (born 14 March 2004) is a Finnish professional ice hockey player who is a goaltender for the Coachella Valley Firebirds in the American Hockey League (AHL) while under contract to the Seattle Kraken of the National Hockey League (NHL). He was drafted in the second round, 58th overall, by the Kraken in the 2022 NHL entry draft.

A native of Oulu, Finland, Kokko began playing hockey from an early age with the junior teams of Oulun Kärpät. He joined their U16 team in 2018, and joined their U18 team in 2019. After the 2019–20 season, Kokko was awarded the Jarmo Myllys Award for being the best goaltender in the U18 SM-sarja. During the 2021–22 season, he made his Liiga debut and was named to the U20 SM-sarja Second All-Star Team. Kokko started the next season on loan to Kokkolan Hermes of Mestis, and later that season, he was loaned to the SaiPa of the Liiga. He started the 2023–24 season with Kärpät, but midway through the season, he was loaned to the Lahti Pelicans. Kokko led the Pelicans to the Liiga finals, but the team lost to Tappara. The 2024–25 season season was Kokko's first in North America, recording 20 wins with the Firebirds and being named to the AHL's All-Rookie Team. That season, he also made his NHL debut with the Kraken, replacing Joey Daccord in a game against the St. Louis Blues. During the 2025–26 season, after recording 19 wins with the Firebirds, Kokko made his first NHL start, attempting a 'goalie goal' in that game, and then played two more NHL games.

Internationally, Kokko represents Finland, having done so at the 2022 IIHF World U18 Championships, playing one game and winning the bronze medal, and at the 2024 World Junior Ice Hockey Championships, playing five games.

== Playing career ==
=== Finland ===
==== Oulun Kärpät ====
Kokko was born on 14 March 2004, in Oulu, Finland. He began playing hockey at age four with the youth teams of Oulun Kärpät. During the 2018–19 season, Kokko joined Kärpät's U16 SM-sarja team. He made his U16 debut and recorded his first U16 shutout on 1 September 2018, making 22 saves in a 7–0 victory over HC Nokia. After playing 16 games that season, Kokko achieved a .908 save percentage, ranking second in the league. In the playoffs, Kokko played seven games, totaling a .912 save percentage. On 7 April 2019, during the playoffs, Kärpät defeated Jokerit 2–1 to win the U16 championship with Kokko in net.

During the 2019–20 season, on 31 August 2019, Kokko made his U18 SM-sarja debut in a 5–1 loss to Tappara. On 8 September, he made 22 saves in an 8–0 win against HPK to collect his first U18 shutout. On 29 February 2020, Kokko made his debut in the U20 SM-sarja, making 12 saves in a 4–1 win over Mikkelin Jukurit, the only U20 game he played that season. Kokko played his only U16 game of the season on 7 March, making 45 saves in a 2–1 shootout win over KalPa. At the end of the season, he was awarded the Jarmo Myllys Award as the best goalie in the U18 SM-sarja and was selected to the U18 SM-sarja First All-Star Team. During the 2020–21 season, with Kärpät's U18 team, he tallied 15 wins and three shutouts and managed a .925 save percentage.

Prior to the 2021–22 season, Kokko joined Kärpät's Liiga team during the preseason, playing in two games. He made his Liiga debut on 19 November 2021 after replacing an injured Stanislav Galimov with 2:10 remaining against JYP Jyväskylä, making one save in a 10–1 Kärpät victory. On 11 December, he notched his first U20 shutout, putting up 22 saves in a 2–0 victory over the Lahti Pelicans. On December 27, Kokko signed a three-year Liiga contract with Kärpät. In the U20 SM-sarja, Kokko was named the Young Player of the Month for February 2022 after registering three wins and a .943 save percentage. Kokko led the U20 SM-sarja in shutouts that season, with six through 29 games played. He was selected to the U20 SM-sarja Second All-Star Team at the end of the season. During the U20 SM-sarja playoffs, Kokko played six games, registering a .888 save percentage. On 8 July 2022, the Seattle Kraken selected Kokko in the second round, 58th overall, at the 2022 NHL entry draft.

==== Hermes, SaiPa, and Lahti ====
In August 2022, Kärpät loaned Kokko to the Mestis team Kokkolan Hermes to start the 2022–23 season. He made his Mestis debut on 23 September 2022, making 22 saves in a 2–1 win over Rovaniemen Kiekko. The next day, he achieved his first Mestis shutout, once again making 22 saves, this time in a 6–0 defeat of KeuPa HT. In 14 games with Hermes, Kokko totaled four wins, a 2.95 goals against average, and a .901 save percentage. On 15 October, Kokko played one game with Kärpät his only one of the season, appearing for 16 seconds in the third period in place of Leevi Meriläinen, recording no saves. On 11 February 2023, Kärpät loaned Kokko to SaiPa, with a contract covering the rest of the season. On 11 March, in the final game of the regular season, he became injured after a Lahti Pelicans player bumped into him three minutes into the game. Kokko played a total of eight regular season games with SaiPa, managing two wins. Later, Kokko returned for the rest of the season on loan to Hermes, where he played three playoff games, achieving a .916 save percentage. On 9 May, Kokko signed a three-year, entry-level contract with the Seattle Kraken.

During the 2023–24 season, Kokko found a more important role with Kärpät, serving as the team's backup goaltender to Niclas Westerholm. After putting up a 1.69 goals against average in October, Kokko got the first shutout of his Liiga career on 2 November 2023 maling 25 saves in a 4–0 victory over Ilves. He played ten regular season games with Kärpät, getting two wins and registering a .906 save percentage, after which Kokko went to the 2024 World Junior Ice Hockey Championships, causing him to be replaced by Tomi Karhunen of HIFK. On 16 January 2024, Kokko's loan agreement with Kärpät was terminated when the team signed Karhunen for the rest of the season, leaving Kokko as Kärpät's third goaltender. Later that day, it was announced that he would be on loan with the Lahti Pelicans for the rest of the season.

In his first two games with the Pelicans, Kokko achieved a 3–0–1 record as well as two shutouts. By mid-February, Kokko and Niko Hovinen were the only two goaltenders in the Liiga with a goals against average of less than two. He finished the regular season having totaled nine wins in 13 games with the Pelicans, including four shutouts, and a 1.49 goals against average. During the playoffs, in the quarterfinals against HIFK, Kokko notched a .924 save percentage. He then led the Pelicans to beat his old team, Kärpät, in the semifinals. On 24 April, Kokko made 30 saves in game three of the final against Tappara, a 2–1 victory for the Pelicans. In doing so, he became the fifth-youngest goaltender in Liiga history to win a game in the finals. However, on 28 April, Tappara won the finals, leaving Kokko and the Pelicans with the silver medal. Through 17 playoff games, he had recorded a 1.81 goals against average and a .925 save percentage. On 10 May, the Kraken reassigned Kokko to their American Hockey League (AHL) affiliate, the Coachella Valley Firebirds. On 29 May, Kokko, along with Christian Heljanko and Niklas Rubin, was named a finalist for the Urpo Ylönen Award, given each season to the best goaltender in the Liiga. On 7 June, it was announced that Heljanko won the award, with Kokko having finished second in voting.

=== North America ===
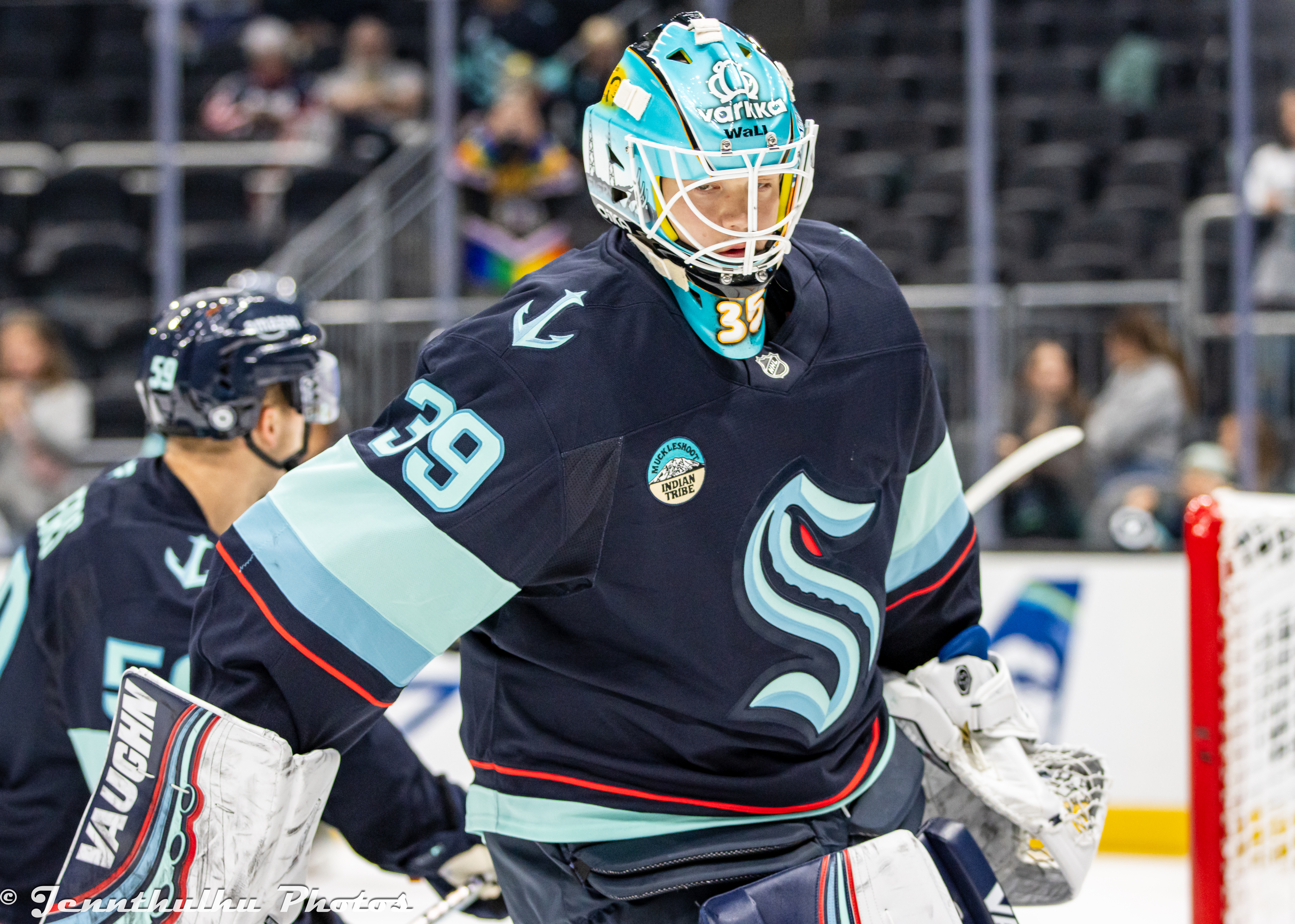
Kokko before a preseason game with the Kraken in 2024

Prior to the 2024–25 season, Kokko participated in the Kraken's rookie camp, also helping the Kraken to a 5–1 win in a Rookie Faceoff exhibition game on 14 September. On 28 September, Kokko was reassigned to the Firebirds. At the start of the season, when asked what named he wanted on the AHL website, instead of "Niklas," which the Kraken had known him by before, he chose "Nikke," as it was a middle choice between "Niklas" and "Nik," his preferred name. On 18 October, he achieved his first AHL win, making 30 saves in a 6–5 victory over the San Diego Gulls. On 22 November, Kokko recorded his sixth AHL win, moving up to a 6–0–0–0 record. On 5 December, he left a game against the Texas Stars with an injury in the second period. He returned for the Firebirds three days later, making 36 saves, but recording his first AHL loss, a 2–1 defeat at the hands of the San Jose Barracuda.

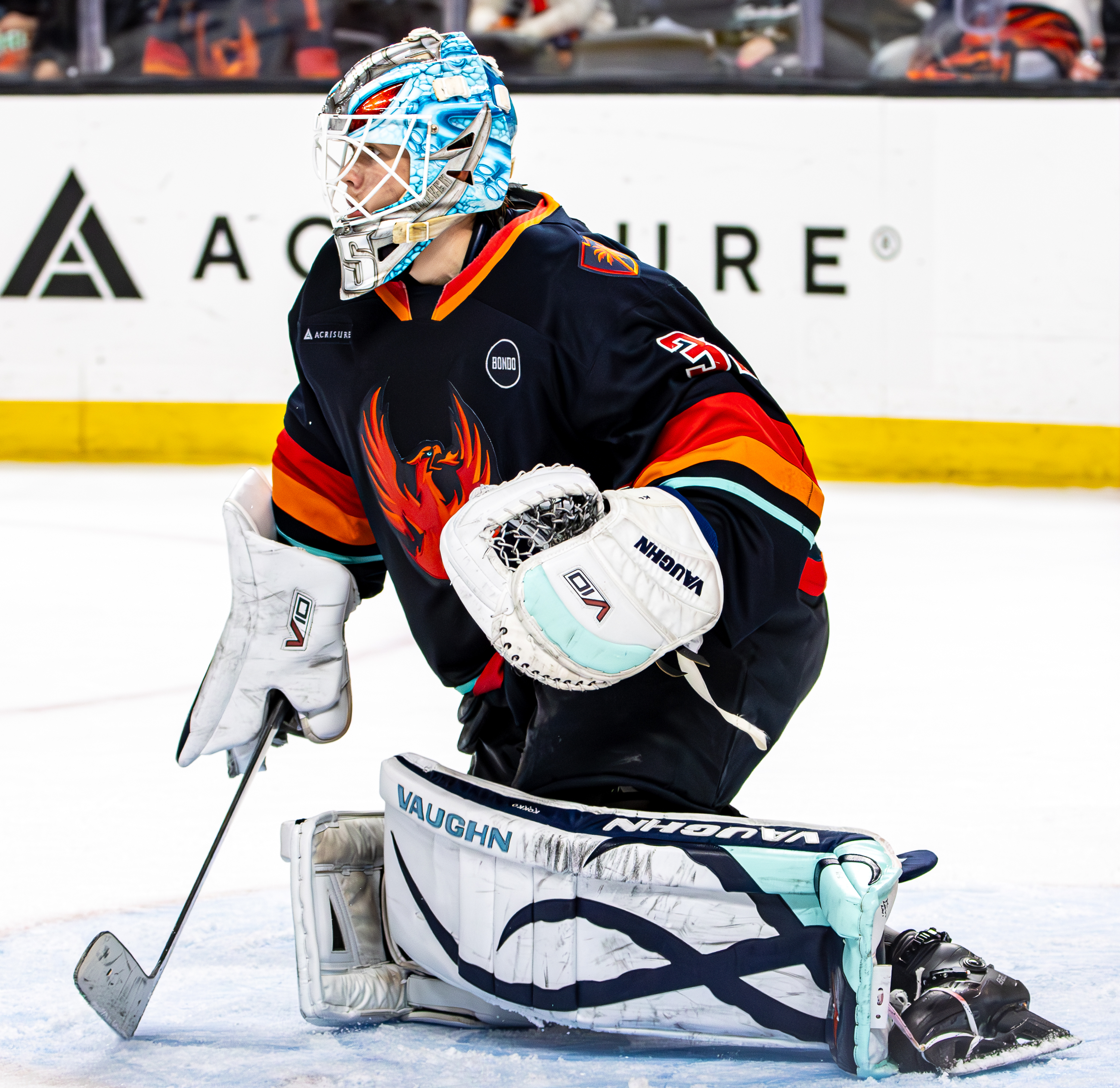
Kokko during his game two shutout against the Wranglers on 26 April 2025

On 24 February 2025, after goaltender Aleš Stezka was sent back down to the Firebirds, Kokko was recalled by the Kraken. The next day, after Joey Daccord allowed five goals on 21 shots against the St. Louis Blues, he was replaced in net by Kokko, making four saves on six shots in what became his NHL debut. On March 2, Kokko was reassigned to the Firebirds after Philipp Grubauer was called up to the Kraken. On April 16, Kokko was named to the AHL All-Rookie Team. Kokko finished his rookie AHL season with 20 wins, a 2.26 goals against average, and a .913 save percentage in 33 games. During the 2025 Calder Cup playoffs, on 23 April, he managed 36 saves in a 4–3 triple overtime victory in game one of the series against the Calgary Wranglers. In game two of the series three days later, he made 23 saves in a 2–0 shutout, his first in the AHL, to help the Firebirds sweep the series. However, the Firebirds lost the next series to the Abbotsford Canucks on May 9, ending their season. Kokko finished the playoffs with a 1.95 goals against average and a .921 save percentage.

Kokko once again participated in the Kraken's rookie camp prior to the 2025–26 season, playing in another Rookie Faceoff game on 13 September 2025. On 24 September, he played the third period of a preseason game against the Edmonton Oilers, and three days later, he was reassigned to the Firebirds. Kokko recorded his first career assist on a goal by Jon-Randall Avon in a 6–3 victory over the Bakersfield Condors on 11 November. On 21 November, he recorded a career-high 41 saves in a 3–2 overtime victory over the San Diego Gulls. One week later against the Gulls, he made 31 saves in a 5–0 shutout, his first in the regular season in the AHL. On 13 March, Kokko got a win against the Ontario Reign, his 34th with the Firebirds, surpassing the record set by Chris Driedger. Kokko recorded his second shutout of the season on 3 April 2026 against the Abbotsford Canucks, making 21 saves in a 2–0 victory. After Matt Murray had to deal with a family matter and Philipp Grubauer was sidelined with a lower-body injury, Kokko was recalled to the Kraken on 9 April. That same day, Kokko backed up Joey Daccord in a game against the Vegas Golden Knights. Later, it was announced that in that game, Daccord had suffered an injury. This led Kokko to make his first NHL start on 11 April, allowing one goal on 27 shots and attempting a 'goalie goal' in a 4–1 win against the Calgary Flames. Kokko played in two more games that season, a 5–3 loss to the Los Angeles Kings and a 4–1 loss to the Golden Knights, leaving his NHL totals that season as a 3.04 goals against average and a .890 save percentage. On 17 April, he was reassigned to the Firebirds, with whom he finished the season with 19 wins, a 3.13 goals against average, a .901 save percentage, and three assists. In the 2026 Calder Cup playoffs, after winning the series against the Bakersfield Condors, Kokko made 23 saves in a 3–0 shutout in game one against the Ontario Reign. After eliminating the Reign in five games, the Firebirds faced the Colorado Eagles. In game two, Kokko collected another shutout, but the Firebirds would go on to lose to the Eagles in four games. Kokko finished the playoffs with a 2.60 goals against average and a .906 save percentage.

== International play ==
Medal record

Representing Finland

Ice hockey

World U18 Championship
| Bronze medal – third place | 2022 Germany | |

On 11 April 2022, Kokko was named to Finland's roster for the 2022 IIHF World U18 Championships. On 23 April, Kokko played his only game of the tournament against Switzerland, making 17 saves in a 6–2 win. Led by Topias Leinonen, Finland went on to win the bronze medal in the tournament.

Kokko then was named to Finland's roster for the 2023 World Junior Ice Hockey Championships, although he served as his team's third goaltender and did not play in a single game. Kokko was named to Finland's roster for the 2024 installment, in which he served as Finland's main goaltender and played five games, including the bronze medal game, which Finland lost to Czechia. He finished the tournament with a 3.86 goals against average and a .870 save percentage.

== Career statistics ==
=== Regular season and playoffs ===
| | | | Regular season | | | | | | | | | Playoffs |
| Season | Team | League | GP | W | L | OTL | MIN | GA | SO | GAA | SV% | GP | W | L | MIN | GA | SO | GAA | SV% |
|---|---|---|---|---|---|---|---|---|---|---|---|---|---|---|---|---|---|---|---|
| 2019–20 | Oulun Kärpät | Jr. A | 25 | — | — | — | — | 44 | — | — | .932 | — | — | — | — | — | — | — | — |
| 2020–21 | Oulun Kärpät | Jr. A | 22 | — | — | — | — | 48 | — | — | — | — | — | — | — | — | — | — | — |
| 2021–22 | Oulun Kärpät | Jr. A | 22 | 17 | 10 | 0 | 1691 | 58 | 6 | 2.06 | .925 | 6 | 2 | 4 | 359 | 18 | 0 | 3.01 | .888 |
| 2021–22 | Oulun Kärpät | Liiga | 1 | 0 | 0 | 0 | 1 | 0 | 0 | 0.00 | 1.000 | — | — | — | — | — | — | — | — |
| 2022–23 | Oulun Kärpät | Liiga | 1 | 0 | 0 | 0 | 1 | 0 | 0 | 0.00 | 1.000 | — | — | — | — | — | — | — | — |
| 2022–23 | Kokkolan Hermes | Mestis | 14 | 4 | 6 | 4 | 833 | 41 | 1 | 2.95 | .901 | 3 | 1 | 2 | 208 | 8 | 0 | 2.31 | .917 |
| 2022–23 | SaiPa | Liiga | 8 | 2 | 2 | 1 | 343 | 17 | 0 | 2.98 | .903 | — | — | — | — | — | — | — | — |
| 2023–24 | Oulun Kärpät | Liiga | 10 | 2 | 5 | 1 | 559 | 22 | 1 | 2.36 | .906 | — | — | — | — | — | — | — | — |
| 2023–24 | Lahti Pelicans | Liiga | 13 | 9 | 0 | 3 | 763 | 19 | 4 | 1.49 | .926 | 17 | 9 | 8 | 1096 | 33 | 1 | 1.81 | .925 |
| 2024–25 | Coachella Valley Firebirds | AHL | 33 | 20 | 10 | 2 | 1939 | 73 | 0 | 2.26 | .913 | 6 | 3 | 3 | 399 | 13 | 1 | 1.95 | .921 |
| 2024–25 | Seattle Kraken | NHL | 1 | 0 | 0 | 0 | 30 | 2 | 0 | 4.01 | .667 | — | — | — | — | — | — | — | — |
| 2025–26 | Coachella Valley Firebirds | AHL | 35 | 19 | 10 | 2 | 1917 | 100 | 2 | 3.13 | .901 | 12 | 6 | 6 | 715 | 31 | 2 | 2.60 | .906 |
| 2025–26 | Seattle Kraken | NHL | 3 | 1 | 2 | 0 | 178 | 9 | 0 | 3.04 | .890 | — | — | — | — | — | — | — | — |
| Liiga totals | | | 33 | 13 | 7 | 5 | 1,667 | 58 | 5 | 2.09 | .913 | 17 | 9 | 8 | 1,096 | 33 | 0 | 1.81 | .925 |
| NHL totals | | | 4 | 1 | 2 | 0 | 208 | 11 | 0 | 3.18 | .875 | — | — | — | — | — | — | — | — |

=== International ===
| Year | Team | Event | Result | GP | W | L | OT | MIN | GA | SO | GAA | SV% |
|---|---|---|---|---|---|---|---|---|---|---|---|---|
| 2022 | Finland | U18 | 3rd place, bronze medalist(s) | 1 | 1 | 0 | 0 | 60 | 2 | 0 | 2.00 | .895 |
| 2024 | Finland | WJC | 4th | 5 | 1 | 4 | 0 | 296 | 19 | 0 | 3.86 | .870 |
| Junior totals | | | | 6 | 2 | 4 | 0 | 356 | 21 | 0 | 2.93 | .883 |
