= Artur Akhtyamov =

Russian ice hockey player (born 2001)

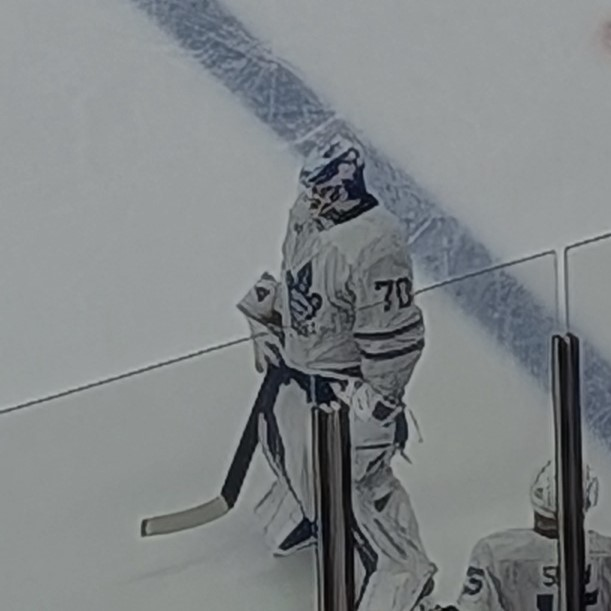
- Akhtyamov in 2024
- Born: 31 October 2001 (age 25) Kazan, Tatarstan, Russia
- Height: 6 ft 2 in (188 cm)
- Weight: 176 lb (80 kg; 12 st 8 lb)
- Position: Goaltender
- Catches: Left
- NHL team (P) Cur. team Former teams: Toronto Maple Leafs; Toronto Marlies (AHL); Ak Bars Kazan
- NHL draft: 106th overall, 2020; Toronto Maple Leafs
- Playing career: 2020–present

Artur Akhtyamov (born 31 October 2001) is a Russian professional ice hockey player who is a goaltender for the Toronto Marlies of the American Hockey League (AHL) while under contract to the Toronto Maple Leafs of the National Hockey League (NHL).

== Career statistics ==
			Regular season									Playoffs
Season	Team	League	GP	W	L	OTL	MIN	GA	SO	GAA	SV%	GP	W	L	MIN	GA	SO	GAA	SV%
2018–19	Irbis Kazan	MHL	54	22	23	3	2,951	113	5	2.30	.921	—	—	—	—	—	—	—	—
2019–20	Irbis Kazan	MHL	46	26	13	6	2,568	77	7	1.80	.931	—	—	—	—	—	—	—	—
2020–21	Bars Kazan	VHL	14	5	4	4	821	26	1	1.90	.927	—	—	—	—	—	—	—	—
2020–21	Irbis Kazan	MHL	9	5	4	0	543	15	3	1.66	.935	12	6	6	728	30	1	2.47	.915
2020–21	Ak Bars Kazan	KHL	3	0	1	1	103	5	0	2.90	.904	—	—	—	—	—	—	—	—
2021–22	Irbis Kazan	MHL	3	3	0	0	180	5	0	1.67	.943	2	0	2	114	8	0	4.21	.869
2021–22	Ak Bars Kazan	KHL	1	0	1	0	58	4	0	4.14	.810	—	—	—	—	—	—	—	—
2021–22	Bars Kazan	VHL	38	9	17	9	1,922	86	1	2.69	.912	4	0	4	212	11	0	3.12	.901
2022–23	Neftyanik Almetyevsk	VHL	39	20	12	6	2,238	65	6	1.74	.943	6	2	4	353	9	2	1.53	.952
2023–24	Neftyanik Almetyevsk	VHL	19	10	5	4	1,110	37	3	2.00	.927	21	16	5	1,313	47	2	2.15	0
2023–24	Ak Bars Kazan	KHL	17	6	7	0	813	34	1	2.51	.921	—	—	—	—	—	—	—	—
2024–25	Toronto Marlies	AHL	26	11	8	4	1,450	68	3	2.81	.901	—	—	—	—	—	—	—	—
2025–26	Toronto Marlies	AHL	17	6	7	0	813	34	1	2.51	.921	22	15	7	1,324	49	2	2.22	.923
2025–26	Toronto Maple Leafs	NHL	3	0	2	0	126	11	0	5.24	.877	—	—	—	—	—	—	—	—
KHL totals			21	6	9	1	974	43	1	3.18	.882	—	—	—	—	—	—	—	—

== Awards and honours ==
Award	Year
MHL
All-Star game	2020
VHL
Best save percentage	2023
Most shutouts	2023
Playoffs MVP	2024
Petrov Cup champion	2024
AHL
Jack A. Butterfield Trophy	2026
Calder Cup champion	2026
