= Sergei Murashov =

Russian ice hockey player (born 2004)

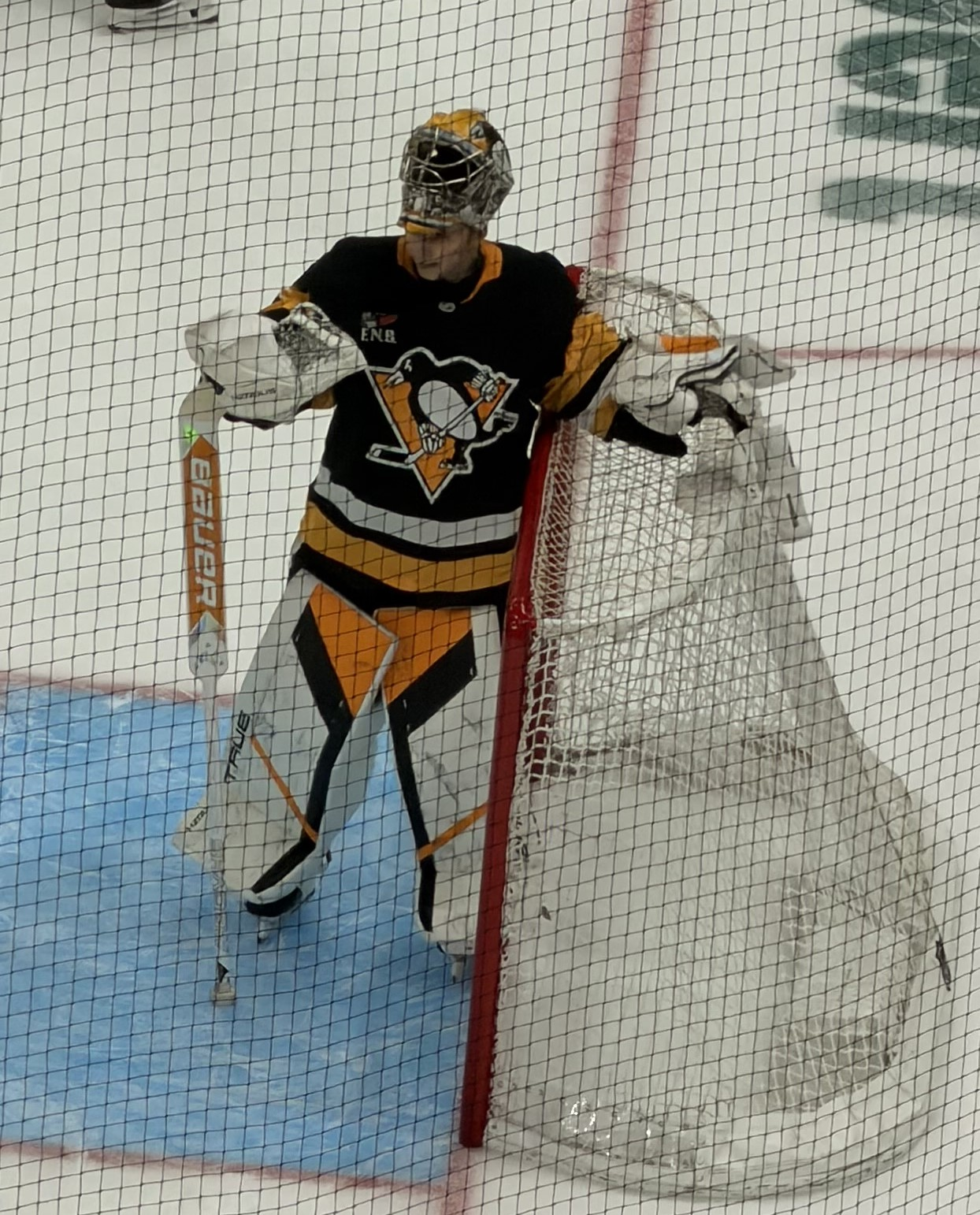
- Murashov in his NHL debut with the Pittsburgh Penguins in 2025
- Born: 1 April 2004 (age 22) Yaroslavl, Russia
- Height: 6 ft 2 in (188 cm)
- Weight: 185 lb (84 kg; 13 st 3 lb)
- Position: Goaltender
- Catches: Right
- NHL team Former teams: Pittsburgh Penguins; Lokomotiv Yaroslavl
- NHL draft: 118th overall, 2022; Pittsburgh Penguins
- Playing career: 2022–present

Sergei Murashov (born 1 April 2004) is a Russian professional ice hockey player who is a goaltender for the Pittsburgh Penguins of the National Hockey League (NHL). He was drafted 118th overall by the Pittsburgh Penguins in the 2022 NHL entry draft.

== Playing career ==
=== Lokomotiv Yaroslavl ===
In his native Russia, Murashov played for Lokomotiv Yaroslavl in both the MHL, the country's top developmental league, and the Kontinental Hockey League. In the MHL, he amassed a career record of 73–30–12 with a 2.04 goals against average, .934 save percentage, and twenty-two shutouts in 125 appearances. He was named the MHL's Best Goalkeeper for the 2022–23 season with career bests of twenty-four wins, a 1.58 GAA, .948 SV%, and eleven shutouts. Across two KHL seasons, Murashov made a total of seven appearances with a 4–2–1 record as he maintained a 1.71 GAA and a .928 SV%.

=== Pittsburgh Penguins ===
Murashov was drafted by the Pittsburgh Penguins with the 118th overall pick in the 2022 NHL entry draft. In June 2024, he signed a three-year, entry-level contract with the team. He traveled to the United States to represent the Penguins in the Prospect Challenge in Buffalo, New York the following September as the team decided where Murashov would be assigned to start the season.

Murashov joined the Wilkes-Barre/Scranton Penguins of the AHL in October 2024. He made his North American and AHL debut on 13 October with a 4–1 win against the Springfield Thunderbirds. He made twenty-seven saves in the game. Murashov split the 2024–25 season between the AHL and the Penguins' ECHL affiliate the Wheeling Nailers. With a win against the Cincinnati Cyclones on 27 December 2024, Murashov won his eleventh straight game, breaking a Wheeling record that had stood for over twenty years, at just twenty years old. Between 6 November 2024 to 8 January 2025, Murashov would go on to win thirteen straight games, a Nailers franchise record and an ECHL record for a rookie goaltender. In January 2025, he was selected for the ECHL All-Star Game. On 22 March 2025, he won his tenth consecutive game to break the Wilkes-Barre/Scranton record for winning streak by a rookie goaltender. The previous record of nine was held by Matt Murray. With the victory, he was also one win from tying John Curry's overall franchise record of eleven consecutive wins. Murashov got the win in the team's next game, a contest against the Hartford Wolf Pack on 26 March, to tie Curry's record which had stood since the 2008–09 AHL season. Murashov lost his first AHL game the following week on 30 March 2025 in a 2–5 defeat to the Charlotte Checkers in which he saved thirty-two of thirty-five shots, ending his streak at eleven wins. Murashov finished the season with a 17–7–1 record, .922 SV%, and 2.40 GAA in twenty-six games in the ECHL. Following the season, he was named Wheeling's Rookie of the Year.

On 4 November 2025, Murashov was recalled to the Pittsburgh Penguins after Tristan Jarry was placed on injured reserve. Prior to being recalled, he posted a 5–2–0 record with a 1.73 GAA, a .931 SV%, and one shutout for Wilkes-Barre/Scranton. Murashov made his NHL debut on 9 November at home against the Los Angeles Kings. He saved twenty-four of twenty-seven shots, ultimately losing 2–3. With the debut, Murashov became just the second Penguins goalie from Russia, after Alexander Pechursky who debuted in 2010. One week later, his second start saw him earn his first win and first shutout, saving all 21 shots and defeating the Nashville Predators in an NHL Global Series game in Stockholm, Sweden.

== Career statistics ==
=== Regular season and playoffs ===
			Regular season									Playoffs
Season	Team	League	GP	W	L	OTL	MIN	GA	SO	GAA	SV%	GP	W	L	MIN	GA	SO	GAA	SV%
2022–23	Lokomotiv Yaroslavl	KHL	1	1	0	0	60	1	0	1.00	.947	0	0	0	0	0	0	0	0
2023–24	Lokomotiv Yaroslavl	KHL	6	3	1	2	325	10	1	1.84	.925	0	0	0	0	0	0	0	0
2024–25	Wilkes-Barre/Scranton Penguins	AHL	16	12	3	0	932	41	1	2.64	.913	1	0	1	59	3	0	3.07	.903
2024–25	Wheeling Nailers	ECHL	26	17	7	1	1,556	62	1	2.40	.922	3	0	3	173	11	0	3.82	.857
2025–26	Wilkes-Barre/Scranton Penguins	AHL	38	24	9	4	2,154	79	4	2.20	.919	15	8	7	937	33	1	2.11	.931
2025–26	Pittsburgh Penguins	NHL	5	1	1	2	281	12	1	2.56	.897	—	—	—	—	—	—	—	—
KHL totals			7	4	1	2	385	11	1	1.71	.928	0	0	0	0	0	0	0	0
