= William Villeneuve =

Canadian ice hockey player (born 2002)

- Born: March 20, 2002 (age 24) Sherbrooke, Quebec, Canada
- Height: 6 ft 2 in (188 cm)
- Weight: 183 lb (83 kg; 13 st 1 lb)
- Position: Defence
- Shoots: Right
- NHL team: Toronto Maple Leafs
- NHL draft: 122nd overall, 2020; Toronto Maple Leafs
- Playing career: 2021–present

William Villeneuve (born March 20, 2002) is a Canadian professional ice hockey defenceman currently playing with the Toronto Maple Leafs of the National Hockey League (NHL).

== Awards and honours ==
Award	Year	Ref
QMJHL
Second All-Star Team	2021–22	
Gilles-Courteau Trophy champion	2021–22	
CHL
Memorial Cup champion	2022	
AHL
Calder Cup champion	2026	
