= Domenick Fensore =

American ice hockey player (born 2001)

- Born: September 7, 2001 (age 25) Thornwood, New York, United States
- Height: 5 ft 9 in (175 cm)
- Weight: 175 lb (79 kg; 12 st 7 lb)
- Position: Defense
- Shoots: Left
- NHL team (P) Cur. team Former teams: Colorado Avalanche; Colorado Eagles (AHL); Carolina Hurricanes
- NHL draft: 90th overall, 2019; Carolina Hurricanes
- Playing career: 2023–present

Domenick Fensore (born September 7, 2001) is an American professional ice hockey defenseman for the Colorado Eagles of the American Hockey League (AHL) while under contract to the Colorado Avalanche of the National Hockey League (NHL). He was selected by the Carolina Hurricanes in the third round, 90th overall, of the 2019 NHL entry draft.

== Playing career ==
Fensore played collegiate hockey with the Boston University Terriers in the Hockey East, before he was signed by the Carolina Hurricanes to a two-year, entry-level contract on April 15, 2023.

Fensore played the final two regular season games of the 2024–25 NHL season for the Hurricanes, making his NHL debut against the Montreal Canadiens on April 16, 2025.

He was signed by the Hurricanes to a one-year contract extension for the 2025–26 season on July 16, 2025. Assigned to continue his tenure in the AHL with the Wolves, Fensore recorded a career-high 35 points across 60 games. He led the blueline in assists, leading to his selection to the AHL All-Star Game. He was recalled to the Hurricanes once during the season and made a lone appearance in a 6-3 defeat to the Vegas Golden Knights on October 28, 2025. In the post-season with the Wolves, Fensore appeared in 18 Calder Cup playoff games, collecting 6 points on route to the Calder Cup Finals.

As a pending restricted free agent, Fensore was not tendered a qualifying offer and was released as a free agent. On July 1, 2026, Fensore was signed to a one-year, two-way contract with the Colorado Avalanche for the 2026–27 season.

== Career statistics ==
=== Regular season and playoffs ===
| | | | Regular season | | | | | Playoffs |
| Season | Team | League | GP | G | A | Pts | PIM | GP | G | A | Pts | PIM |
|---|---|---|---|---|---|---|---|---|---|---|---|---|
| 2017–18 | U.S. National Development Team | USHL | 35 | 1 | 15 | 16 | 18 | 8 | 0 | 1 | 1 | 6 |
| 2018–19 | U.S. National Development Team | USHL | 25 | 6 | 20 | 26 | 6 | — | — | — | — | — |
| 2019–20 | Boston University | HE | 34 | 3 | 13 | 16 | 24 | — | — | — | — | — |
| 2020–21 | Boston University | HE | 16 | 2 | 6 | 8 | 16 | — | — | — | — | — |
| 2021–22 | Boston University | HE | 35 | 5 | 26 | 31 | 8 | — | — | — | — | — |
| 2022–23 | Boston University | HE | 37 | 9 | 22 | 31 | 30 | — | — | — | — | — |
| 2023–24 | Norfolk Admirals | ECHL | 9 | 2 | 8 | 10 | 2 | — | — | — | — | — |
| 2023–24 | Chicago Wolves | AHL | 39 | 2 | 14 | 16 | 18 | — | — | — | — | — |
| 2024–25 | Chicago Wolves | AHL | 67 | 9 | 23 | 32 | 39 | 1 | 0 | 0 | 0 | 0 |
| 2024–25 | Carolina Hurricanes | NHL | 2 | 0 | 0 | 0 | 2 | — | — | — | — | — |
| 2025–26 | Chicago Wolves | AHL | 60 | 10 | 25 | 35 | 37 | 18 | 4 | 2 | 6 | 12 |
| 2025–26 | Carolina Hurricanes | NHL | 1 | 0 | 0 | 0 | 0 | — | — | — | — | — |
| NHL totals | | | 3 | 0 | 0 | 0 | 2 | — | — | — | — | — |

=== International ===
| Year | Team | Event | Result | GP | G | A | Pts | PIM |
|---|---|---|---|---|---|---|---|---|
| 2017 | United States | U17 | 1st place, gold medalist(s) | 6 | 0 | 4 | 4 | 2 |
| 2019 | United States | U18 | 3rd place, bronze medalist(s) | 7 | 0 | 4 | 4 | 2 |
| Junior totals | | | | 13 | 0 | 8 | 8 | 4 |
