= Michal Postava =

Czech ice hockey player (born 2002)

- Born: 28 February 2002 (age 24) Valašské Meziříčí, Czech Republic
- Height: 6 ft 2 in (188 cm)
- Weight: 205 lb (93 kg; 14 st 9 lb)
- Position: Goaltender
- Catches: Left
- NHL team (P) Cur. team Former teams: Detroit Red Wings; Grand Rapids Griffins (AHL); HC Kometa Brno
- NHL draft: Undrafted
- Playing career: 2020–present

Michal Postava (born 28 February 2002) is a Czech professional ice hockey player who is a goaltender for the Grand Rapids Griffins of the American Hockey League (AHL), while under contract to the Detroit Red Wings of the National Hockey League (NHL). He previously played for HC Kometa Brno of the Czech Extraliga.

== Playing career ==
Postava began his career with HC ZUBR Přerov of the Czech 1. Liga. In 96 games during parts of five seasons from 2019 to 2024, he posted a 46–46–0 record with a 2.01 goals against average (GAA), a .936 save percentage and nine shutouts. He then joined HC Kometa Brno of the ELH. During the 2024–25 season, he posted a 23–18–0 record with a 2.39 GAA, a .921 save percentage and three shutouts in 42 regular season games. During the playoffs he posted a 10–7 record with a 1.97 GAA, a .940 save percentage and three shutouts in 17 postseason games. During game 7 of the Czech Extraliga Final against HC Dynamo Pardubice, he had a 21 save shutout to help HC Kometa Brno win the Czech Extraliga championship.

On 11 June 2025, Postava signed a two-year, entry-level contract with the Detroit Red Wings of the NHL. On 10 April 2026, he was recalled by the Red Wings under emergency conditions. He was assigned to the Grand Rapids Griffins of the AHL the next day. He finished the 2025–26 season, with a 17–6–0 record, a 1.71 GAA, .937 save percentage and four shutouts in 25 regular season games with the Griffins. He set single-season franchise records in GAA and save percentage while never allowing more than three goals in a game. His four shutouts set a franchise rookie record for the most in a single season. He tied a franchise record by becoming the tenth goaltender in franchise history to post back-to-back shutouts from January 17 to 21. He posted a shutout streak of 156:20 from January 9 to 25, which was 3:47 short of breaking the franchise record set by Jared Coreau in the 2014–15 season (160:06). Together with Sebastian Cossa, the Griffins finished the regular season with a franchise-best record of 51–16–4–1, and finished in first place in both the Central Division and Western Conference. Following the season, he won the Harry "Hap" Holmes Memorial Award. He was named the Griffins' starter for the 2026 Calder Cup playoffs. During the playoffs he posted a 4–4 record, with a 2.09 GAA, .912 save percentage and one shutout to help the Griffins advance to the Western Conference division finals.

On 22 October 2026, Postava was recalled by the Red Wings under emergency conditions. Prior to being recalled he posted a 4–0–0 record with a 1.25 GAA and a 0.954 save percentage in four starts with the Griffins to begin the 2026–27 season. He made his NHL debut later that day against the Vancouver Canucks and made seven saves in relief after starting goaltender John Gibson did not come out for the third period due to an upper-body injury. He made his first career NHL start on 26 October 2026 against the Edmonton Oilers. He made 25 saves in regulation and overtime, and stopped shots from Connor McDavid, Leon Draisaitl, and Ryan Nugent-Hopkins in the shootout, to help the Red Wings to a 4–3 win. He became the third Red Wings goaltender in the past 25 years to win in his first career NHL start, following Petr Mrázek (2013) and Jimmy Howard (2005).

== Career statistics ==
			Regular season									Playoffs
Season	Team	League	GP	W	L	OT	MIN	GA	SO	GAA	SV%	GP	W	L	MIN	GA	SO	GAA	SV%
2024–25	HC Kometa Brno	ELH	42	23	18	0	2,436	97	0	2.39	.920	17	10	7	1,036	34	0	1.97	.940
2025–26	Grand Rapids Griffins	AHL	25	17	6	0	1,401	40	4	1.71	.937	8	4	4	489	17	1	2.09	.912
AHL totals			25	17	6	0	1,401	40	4	1.71	.937	8	4	4	489	17	1	2.09	.912

== Awards and honours ==
Award	Year	Ref
AHL
Harry "Hap" Holmes Memorial Award	2025–26	
