= Georgi Romanov =

Russian ice hockey player (born 1999)

- Born: December 15, 1999 (age 26) Yekaterinburg, Russia
- Height: 6 ft 5 in (196 cm)
- Weight: 210 lb (95 kg; 15 st 0 lb)
- Position: Goaltender
- Catches: Left
- NHL team (P) Cur. team Former teams: St. Louis Blues; Springfield Thunderbirds (AHL); Avtomobilist Yekaterinburg; San Jose Sharks
- NHL draft: Undrafted
- Playing career: 2018–present

Georgi Romanov (born December 15, 1999) is a Russian professional ice hockey goaltender for the Springfield Thunderbirds of the American Hockey League (AHL) while under contract to the St. Louis Blues of the National Hockey League (NHL). He has previously played in the NHL for the San Jose Sharks, and also played one game with Avtomobilist Yekaterinburg of the Kontinental Hockey League (KHL).

== Playing career ==
From 2016 to 2020, Romanov appeared in 86 games with Avto Yekaterinburg and Omskie Yastreby during the regular season of the Junior Hockey League (MHL), Russia's top level of junior hockey. He recorded a .938 save percentage, a 1.88 goals against average and went 37–22–11.

Romanov spent four seasons in the Supreme Hockey League (VHL), Russia's second-highest level of professional hockey, compiling a .916 save percentage, a 2.58 goals against average and a 28–33–10 record. In the 2020–21 VHL season, Romanov played in nine regular season games for Gornyak Uchaly. He had a .933 save percentage, a 2.18 goals against average and a 4–4–0 record. During the 2021–22 VHL season, he appeared in a career-high 39 games for Gornyak-UGMK, posting a .919 save percentage, a 2.47 goals against average and went 16–15–5.

In the 2022–23 VHL season, Romanov played in 31 games for Gornyak-UGMK. He finished with a .907 save percentage, a 2.81 goals against average and a 8–13–5 record. In his three playoff games with Gorntak-UGMK, he had a .918 save percentage, a 3.15 goals against average and a 2–1–0 record. In each of his first two playoffs starts, he helped his team win in overtime. He also played in one Kontinental Hockey League (KHL) game, with his only appearance with Avtomobilist Yekaterinburg happening during the shootout segment of a 5–4 shootout loss to Barys Astana on December 24, 2022. He saved three of the four shootout attempts he faced. Romanov was credited with an overtime loss, no minutes played and no goals against him. On May 3, 2023, Romanov signed a two-year, entry-level contract with the San Jose Sharks.

During the 2023–24 ECHL season, Romanov posted a 3–3–1 record, an .870 save percentage and a 4.00 goals against average for the Wichita Thunder. During the 2023–24 AHL season, Romanov was 9–9–8 with a .904 save percentage and a 3.14 goals against average for the San Jose Barracuda. He was recalled by the Sharks on April 14, 2024. He made his on-ice NHL debut for the Sharks on April 15, 2024, after Devin Cooley gave up eight goals to the Edmonton Oilers. Romanov saved 16 of 17 shots in the 9–2 loss to the Oilers. In the two games he played in during the 2023–24 NHL season, Romanov had a .967 save percentage and a 1.01 goals against average.

In the 2024–25 season, Romanov made 8 appearances for the San Jose Sharks, with 6 of those being starts.

Going un-signed through the 2025 offseason, Romanov joined the New Jersey Devils on a professional tryout agreement on September 5, 2025; he subsequently signed a one-year contract with the St. Louis Blues just over one month later, on October 8.

== Personal life ==
Romanov was born on December 15, 1999, in Yekaterinburg, Russia. He is married. When Romanov and his wife lived in Yekaterinburg, she was a food blogger.

== Career statistics ==
			Regular season									Playoffs
Season	Team	League	GP	W	L	OTL	MIN	GA	SO	GAA	SV%	GP	W	L	MIN	GA	SO	GAA	SV%
2016–17	Avto Yekaterinburg	MHL	4	1	2	0	163	5	0	1.84	.940	—	—	—	—	—	—	—	—
2017–18	Avto Yekaterinburg	MHL	10	1	1	1	292	11	1	2.26	.912	—	—	—	—	—	—	—	—
2018–19	Omskie Yastreby	MHL	29	12	8	3	1,404	41	5	1.75	.940	8	5	3	492	20	0	2.44	.920
2019–20	Gornyak Uchaly	VHL	1	0	1	0	60	4	0	4.00	.833	—	—	—	—	—	—	—	—
2019–20	Avto Yekaterinburg	MHL	43	23	11	7	2,382	76	10	1.91	.939	2	1	1	119	4	0	2.01	.932
2020–21	Gornyak Uchaly	VHL	9	4	4	0	468	17	0	2.18	.933	—	—	—	—	—	—	—	—
2021–22	Gornyak-UGMK	VHL	39	16	15	5	2,235	92	2	2.47	.919	1	0	0	40	3	0	4.50	.824
2022–23	Avtomobilist Yekaterinburg	KHL	1	0	0	1	0	—	—	—	—	—	—	—	—	—	—	—	—
2022–23	Gornyak-UGMK	VHL	31	8	13	5	1,494	70	1	2.81	.907	3	2	1	190	10	0	3.15	.918
2023–24	San Jose Sharks	NHL	2	0	0	0	59	1	0	1.01	.967	—	—	—	—	—	—	—	—
2023–24	San Jose Barracuda	AHL	29	9	9	8	1,548	81	0	3.14	.904	—	—	—	—	—	—	—	—
2023–24	Wichita Thunder	ECHL	7	3	3	1	419	28	0	4.00	.870	—	—	—	—	—	—	—	—
2024–25	San Jose Barracuda	AHL	21	11	6	3	1,218	63	0	3.10	.905	—	—	—	—	—	—	—	—
2024–25	San Jose Sharks	NHL	8	0	6	0	417	27	0	3.89	.877	—	—	—	—	—	—	—	—
2025–26	Springfield Thunderbirds	AHL	28	9	12	3	1,478	81	1	3.29	.896	11	7	4	652	20	2	1.84	.939
KHL totals			1	0	0	1	0	—	—	—	—	—	—	—	—	—	—	—	—
NHL totals			10	0	6	0	476	28	0	3.53	.888	—	—	—	—	—	—	—	—
