= Ivan Ivan (ice hockey) =

Czech ice hockey player (born 2002)

- Ivan with the Colorado Avalanche in 2024
- Born: 20 August 2002 (age 24) Ostrava, Czech Republic
- Height: 6 ft 0 in (183 cm)
- Weight: 190 lb (86 kg; 13 st 8 lb)
- Position: Centre
- Shoots: Left
- NHL team (P) Cur. team Former teams: Boston Bruins; Providence Bruins (AHL); Colorado Avalanche
- NHL draft: Undrafted
- Playing career: 2019–present

Ivan Ivan (born 20 August 2002) is a Czech professional ice hockey player who is a centre for the Providence Bruins of the American Hockey League (AHL) as a prospect under contract to the Boston Bruins of the National Hockey League (NHL).

== Playing career ==
As a youth, Ivan played ice hockey for the club HC Vítkovice Ridera. He was a member of the under-16 team from 2015 to 2018, appearing in 67 games and scoring 65 points (37 goals, 28 assists). He was promoted to the under-18 team during the 2017–18 season and appeared in 14 games, registering six points (three goals, three assists). During 2018–19, he was a member of the under-19 squad and scored 39 points in 43 appearances, also making one appearance in the Czech fourth-tier with HC Bohumín on a loan.

Ivan moved to North America in 2019, playing the 2019–20 season with the Cape Breton Eagles of the Quebec Major Junior Hockey League (QMJHL). After playing 62 games and scoring 22 points for the Eagles, he returned to the Czech Republic during the COVID-19 pandemic and appeared in five games in the Czech second-tier for AZ Havířov. Ivan then went back to Canada for the 2021–22 season, being the leading point scorer (65), goal scorer (31) and joint-assist scorer (34) for the Eagles in 61 games played. In 2022–23, Ivan led the Eagles in all three categories, having a career-best 90 points, 33 goals, and 57 assists in 64 games, being among the top 10 in the QMJHL in points and assists. He concluded his Eagles career with 191 regular season games played, 177 points, 75 goals and 102 assists.

Ivan was not selected in the NHL entry draft. He turned professional in 2023, signing a contract with the Colorado Eagles of the American Hockey League (AHL). He appeared in 67 games and registered 31 points (12 goals, 19 assists). On 5 March 2024, he signed a two-year contract with the Colorado Avalanche of the National Hockey League (NHL). Although initially reassigned to the Eagles for the 2024–25 season, he was recalled from the AHL before NHL season's opening night. Ivan made his NHL debut on 9 October, against the Vegas Golden Knights, playing just under 10 minutes. In doing so, he became the first NHL player in history to have the same first and last name. He was reassigned to the AHL the following day. Ivan scored his first NHL goal on 24 October, assisted by Nathan MacKinnon and Casey Mittelstadt.

In the 2025–26 season, Ivan featured in 9 regular season games with the President Trophy winning Avalanche, while playing predominately with the Colorado Eagles in the AHL. Appearing in 66 games with the Eagles, Ivan recorded 11 goals and 15 assists for 26 points. He also skated in 17 games during the 2026 Calder Cup Playoffs, ranking second on the team with 15 playoff points.

On 27 June 2026, Ivan was traded at the 2026 NHL entry draft by the Avalanche to the Boston Bruins in exchange for Fabian Lysell. As a restricted free agent, Ivan agreed to terms with the Bruins on a one-year, two-way contract through the 2026–27 season on 30 June 2026.

== International play ==
Ivan played for the Czech Republic under-17 national team in 2018–19. He competed at the 2019 Hlinka Gretzky Cup in and later for the Czech Republic under-20 national team at the 2022 World Junior Championships.

== Personal life ==
Ivan was born on 20 August 2002 in Ostrava, Czech Republic. Both his father and brother played ice hockey. He told ColoradoEagles.com the origin of his name: "My dad's name is Marek, and his last name is Ivan. Since Marek and Ivan are both first names, people were always wondering whether his name was Marek or Ivan, so he made it easier for me. I like it and it’s special because there are not many people with my name."

He grew up an Avalanche fan in the Czech Republic after playing as them on a PlayStation ice hockey video game.

== Career statistics ==
=== Regular season and playoffs ===
			Regular season					Playoffs
Season	Team	League	GP	G	A	Pts	PIM	GP	G	A	Pts	PIM
2017–18	HC Vítkovice Ridera	Czech.18	14	3	3	6	0	—	—	—	—	—
2018–19	HC Vítkovice Ridera	Czech.19	43	12	27	39	18	4	0	1	1	2
2018–19	HC Bohumín	Czech.3	1	0	1	1	2	—	—	—	—	—
2019–20	Cape Breton Screaming Eagles	QMJHL	62	11	11	22	8	—	—	—	—	—
2020–21	AZ Havířov	Czech.1	5	0	0	0	0	—	—	—	—	—
2021–22	Cape Breton Screaming Eagles	QMJHL	65	31	34	65	22	—	—	—	—	—
2022–23	Cape Breton Screaming Eagles	QMJHL	64	33	57	90	52	4	3	1	4	2
2023–24	Colorado Eagles	AHL	67	12	19	31	20	3	1	0	1	0
2024–25	Colorado Avalanche	NHL	40	5	3	8	8	—	—	—	—	—
2024–25	Colorado Eagles	AHL	36	2	10	12	26	9	1	1	2	0
2025–26	Colorado Eagles	AHL	66	11	15	26	40	17	3	12	15	2
2025–26	Colorado Avalanche	NHL	9	0	1	1	2	—	—	—	—	—
NHL totals			49	5	4	9	10	—	—	—	—	—

=== International ===
Year	Team	Event	Result	GP	G	A	Pts	PIM
2018	Czech Republic	U17	7th	5	0	0	0	0
2019	Czech Republic	HG18	5th	4	1	0	1	0
2022	Czech Republic	WJC	4th	7	0	1	1	2
Junior totals				16	1	1	2	2
