= Noah Philp =

Canadian ice hockey player (born 1998)

- Born: August 31, 1998 (age 27) Canmore, Alberta, Canada
- Height: 6 ft 3 in (191 cm)
- Weight: 198 lb (90 kg; 14 st 2 lb)
- Position: Centre
- Shot: Right
- Played for: Edmonton Oilers; Carolina Hurricanes
- NHL draft: Undrafted
- Playing career: 2022–2026

Noah Philp (born August 31, 1998) is a Canadian former professional ice hockey centre. An undrafted player, Philp played in the National Hockey League (NHL) for the Edmonton Oilers and Carolina Hurricanes.

== Playing career ==
Philp played in the Western Hockey League (WHL) with the Kootenay Ice before being traded to the Seattle Thunderbirds. He later accepted an amateur tryout with the Stockton Heat, the American Hockey League (AHL) affiliate of the Calgary Flames but was not signed to a contract.

Philp continued his hockey career by playing college hockey at the University of Alberta. In 36 games with the Alberta Golden Bears over two seasons, he scored 20 goals and 18 assists.

Philp was signed to a one-year contract with the Edmonton Oilers on April 5, 2022. He finished the season with the Bakersfield Condors on an amateur tryout, playing in 3 games before the contract officially kicked in the next season.

The next season, he had 19 goals and 18 assists in 70 games, earning the attention of many in Oilers management. However, on June 14, 2023, Philp announced his retirement from hockey for personal reasons.

One year later, Philp signed a one-year deal with the Oilers on July 1, 2024, marking his return. He shined in pre-season but was sent down to the Condors for more development. He was called up on October 29, 2024 along with Drake Caggiula after an injury to captain Connor McDavid.

Philp played in his first NHL game on October 31, 2024, a 5–1 win vs. the Nashville Predators. He recorded his first career assist on a Corey Perry goal, which was also the game-winning goal.

On December 28, 2025, several months into the 2025–26 season, Philp was waived by the Oilers; he was subsequently claimed by the Carolina Hurricanes the following day.

Having concluded his contract with the Hurricanes, as a pending free agent, Philp opted to sign a two-year contract abroad with HV71 of the Swedish Hockey League on June 24, 2026. Despite this, Carolina traded his rights to the Anaheim Ducks on June 30, in exchange for Kyle Masters.

On August 7, 2026, the team announced that Philp had broken his contract and decided to retire, citing a lack of motivation to continue playing.

== Personal life ==
Philp was born and raised in Canmore, Alberta. He is the youngest of three hockey-playing brothers. His older brother, Luke, currently plays for the Färjestad BK of the Swedish Hockey League. Both Noah and Luke were occasional team-mates of their eldest brother, Simon, during their time with the Canmore Eagles.

== Career statistics ==
			Regular season					Playoffs
Season	Team	League	GP	G	A	Pts	PIM	GP	G	A	Pts	PIM
2014–15	Canmore Eagles	AJHL	31	1	2	3	8	—	—	—	—	—
2015–16	Kootenay Ice	WHL	67	6	16	22	14	—	—	—	—	—
2016–17	Kootenay Ice	WHL	65	8	11	19	14	—	—	—	—	—
2017–18	Seattle Thunderbirds	WHL	71	14	36	50	20	5	0	0	0	4
2018–19	Seattle Thunderbirds	WHL	56	26	49	75	19	6	2	2	4	2
2018–19	Stockton Heat	AHL	2	0	0	0	2	—	—	—	—	—
2019–20	University of Alberta	USports	28	12	15	27	20	—	—	—	—	—
2021–22	University of Alberta	USports	8	8	3	11	2	—	—	—	—	—
2021–22	Bakersfield Condors	AHL	3	0	0	0	0	3	0	1	1	0
2022–23	Bakersfield Condors	AHL	70	19	18	37	61	2	0	0	0	0
2024–25	Bakersfield Condors	AHL	55	19	16	35	29	—	—	—	—	—
2024–25	Edmonton Oilers	NHL	15	0	2	2	2	—	—	—	—	—
2025–26	Edmonton Oilers	NHL	15	2	1	3	4	—	—	—	—	—
2025–26	Carolina Hurricanes	NHL	2	0	0	0	0	—	—	—	—	—
2025–26	Chicago Wolves	AHL	29	8	9	17	17	21	6	8	14	12
NHL totals			32	2	3	5	6	—	—	—	—	—
