= Mikhail Ilyin (ice hockey) =

Russian ice hockey player (born 2005)

- Born: 15 February 2005 (age 21) Cherepovets, Russia
- Height: 6 ft 0 in (183 cm)
- Weight: 181 lb (82 kg; 12 st 13 lb)
- Position: Forward
- Shoots: Left
- NHL team (P) Cur. team Former teams: Pittsburgh Penguins; WBS Penguins (AHL); Severstal Cherepovets
- NHL draft: 142nd overall, 2023; Pittsburgh Penguins
- Playing career: 2022–present

Mikhail Ilyin (born 15 February 2005) is a Russian professional ice hockey forward for Wilkes-Barre/Scranton Penguins in the American Hockey League (AHL) while under contract as a prospect to the Pittsburgh Penguins in the National Hockey League (NHL).

== Playing career ==
Ilyin played in his native Russia as a youth within the Severstal Cherepovets organization of the Kontinental Hockey League (KHL).

Ilyin was selected by the Pittsburgh Penguins in the fifth-round, 142nd overall, of the 2023 NHL entry draft.

Following the 2024–25 season with Severstal, having established new career high with 30 points in 64 regular season contests, Ilyin was signed to a three-year, entry-level contract with draft club, the Pittsburgh Penguins on 1 June 2025.

== Career statistics ==
			Regular season					Playoffs
Season	Team	League	GP	G	A	Pts	PIM	GP	G	A	Pts	PIM
2021–22	Almaz Cherepovets	MHL	25	4	6	10	2	2	0	0	0	0
2021–22	Metallurg Cherepovets	NMHL	10	4	3	7	2	6	2	3	5	2
2022–23	Severstal Cherepovets	KHL	21	0	2	2	2	—	—	—	—	—
2022–23	Almaz Cherepovets	MHL	28	4	22	26	10	1	0	1	1	0
2023–24	Severstal Cherepovets	KHL	65	12	17	29	20	5	0	4	4	2
2023–24	Almaz Cherepovets	MHL	0	0	0	0	0	8	2	5	7	0
2024–25	Severstal Cherepovets	KHL	64	7	23	30	14	5	0	1	1	4
2024–25	Almaz Cherepovets	MHL	2	0	4	4	2	—	—	—	—	—
2025–26	Severstal Cherepovets	KHL	68	14	30	44	18	5	3	1	4	0
2025–26	Wilkes-Barre/Scranton Penguins	AHL	5	0	2	2	2	15	2	7	9	6
KHL totals			218	33	72	105	54	15	3	6	9	6
