= Springfield Thunderbirds =

American Hockey League team in Springfield, Massachusetts

- City: Springfield, Massachusetts
- League: American Hockey League
- Conference: Eastern
- Division: Atlantic
- Founded: 1975 (NAHL)
- Home arena: MassMutual Center
- Colors: Red, navy blue, sky blue, white, gold
- Owners: Springfield Hockey, LLC.
- General manager: Ryan Miller, Tim Taylor
- Head coach: Steve Ott
- Captain: Chris Wagner
- Media: The Springfield Republican; WHYN NewsRadio 560; CBS 3, 22 News; ABC 40; AHL on FloHockey
- Affiliates: St. Louis Blues (NHL); Worcester Railers (ECHL)

Franchise history
- 1975–1982: Erie Blades
- 1982–1993: Baltimore Skipjacks
- 1993–2016: Portland Pirates
- 2016–present: Springfield Thunderbirds

Championships
- Conference titles: 1 (2021–22)

The Springfield Thunderbirds are a professional ice hockey team based in Springfield, Massachusetts. They are the American Hockey League (AHL) affiliate of the National Hockey League's St. Louis Blues. The Thunderbirds play their home games at the MassMutual Center.

== History ==
In May 2016, following the relocation of the Springfield Falcons to Tucson, Arizona, after the team was sold to the Arizona Coyotes, the AHL's Portland Pirates were sold to a Springfield-based group who relocated the franchise to Springfield for the 2016–17 season.

The new owners were a consortium of local business interests seeking to keep hockey in Springfield, and included Paul Picknelly, owner of the Springfield Sheraton and member of the family-owning Peter Pan Bus Lines, as well as several local hotel owners. A team from Springfield has taken the ice in the AHL and its predecessors for all but seven years since 1926, and in every season since 1954.

The Thunderbirds inherited the Florida Panthers' affiliation with the Pirates. The Panthers assigned their assistant general manager, Eric Joyce, to be Springfield's general manager and named Geordie Kinnear as the new head coach. The Thunderbirds also named Bruce Landon, the Falcons' and Indians' longtime president and general manager, as a consultant, while hiring AHL executive Nathan Costa as their executive vice-president in charge of business operations. The team's new name was announced at a press conference on June 15, 2016. Team management explained that Thunderbirds invokes both the mythological Thunderbird and the United States Air Force presence in the region, such as the Barnes and Westover Air Reserve Bases.

The Thunderbirds played their first game on October 15, 2016, a 4–2 loss to the Lehigh Valley Phantoms. Anthony Greco scored the first goal in team history. On October 22, 2016, the Thunderbirds played their home opener, a 5–4 win, against the St. John's IceCaps. Dryden Hunt scored the first goal on home ice, and MacKenzie Weegar scored the game-winning goal in overtime in front of a sellout crowd of 6,793. While the inaugural season did not result in a playoff berth, average attendance rose from 3,108 in the Falcons' last season to 4,618 and including three sellouts.

On February 17, 2018, it was announced that the Springfield Thunderbirds and the MassMutual Center would host the 2019 AHL All-Star Classic and Skills contest, to take place on January 27–28, 2019. This marked the first AHL All-Star Game in Springfield since 1959. MGM Springfield served as the host of the event. The Western Conference was victorious in the skills competition, while the Central Division defeated the Atlantic Division in the championship game of the round-robin event. Both events were sold out.

On March 6, 2020, the Springfield Thunderbirds announced a five-year affiliation deal with the St. Louis Blues of the NHL starting from the 2020–21 season. The affiliation with Florida did not yield any playoff appearances, but saw a number of players recalled to the NHL. The team had seen attendance rise in each of its four seasons. Drew Bannister was announced as the second head coach in team history coming from the Blues' previous affiliate, the San Antonio Rampage. However, due to the ongoing restrictions during the COVID-19 pandemic, the Thunderbirds were one of three teams that opted out of the 2020–21 AHL season.

In the 2021-22 AHL season, with COVID restrictions lifted and the Thunderbirds having by far their best season, they led the Atlantic Division with a 43-26-4-3 record, with a team record average attendance of 5,375. They made the playoffs for the first time, sweeping the Wilkes-Barre/Scranton Penguins and the Charlotte Checkers in the first two rounds before winning the third against the Laval Rocket in seven games. In the Thunderbirds' first Calder Cup Finals appearance, they were defeated by the Chicago Wolves in five games.

On October 4, 2024, the Thunderbirds renewed their affiliation agreement with the St. Louis Blues through the 2030–2031 season.

The market was previously home to:

- Springfield Indians (1926–1994)
- Springfield Falcons (1994–2016)

== Season-by-season results ==
Regular Season											Playoffs					
Season	Games	Won	Lost	OTL	SOL	Points	PCT	Goals for	Goals against	Standing	Year	1st round	2nd round	3rd round	4th round	Finals
2016–17	76	32	33	9	2	75	.493	197	206	6th, Atlantic	2017	Did not qualify				
2017–18	76	32	37	5	2	71	.467	210	233	7th, Atlantic	2018	Did not qualify				
2018–19	76	33	29	9	5	80	.526	250	241	7th, Atlantic	2019	Did not qualify				
2019–20	61	31	27	3	0	65	.533	190	186	5th, Atlantic	2020	Season cancelled due to the COVID-19 pandemic				
2020–21	Did not participate due to the COVID-19 pandemic										2021	Did not participate				
2021–22	76	43	24	6	3	95	.625	233	221	2nd, Atlantic	2022	BYE	W, 3–0, WBS	W, 3–0, CHA	W, 4–3, LAV	L 1–4, CHI
2022–23	72	38	26	3	5	84	.583	230	211	4th, Atlantic	2023	L, 0–2, HFD	—	—	—	—
2023–24	72	30	37	3	2	65	.451	226	244	7th, Atlantic	2024	Did not qualify				
2024–25	72	34	32	2	4	74	.514	218	236	6th, Atlantic	2025	L, 1–2, PRO	—	—	—	—
2025–26	72	32	32	6	2	72	.500	207	240	6th, Atlantic	2026	W, 2–1, CHA	W, 3–1, PRO	L, 2–3, WBS	—	—

== Players ==
=== Current roster ===
Updated November 2, 2026.

No.	Nat	Player	Pos	S/G	Age	Acquired	Birthplace	Contract
9	(Canada)	Michael Buchinger	D	L	22	2024	Markham, Ontario	Blues
42	(Canada)	Quinton Burns	D	R	21	2025	Smiths Falls, Ontario	Blues
8	(Canada)	Justin Carbonneau	RW	R	19	2026	Levis, Quebec	Blues
40	(Canada)	Will Cranley	G	L	24	2023	Peterborough, Ontario	Blues
14	(Canada)	Zach Dean	C	L	23	2023	Grand Prairie, Alberta	Blues
37	(United States)	Jack Finley	C	R	24	2026	St. Louis, Missouri	Blues
6	(United States)	Lukas Fischer	D	L	20	2026	Brighton, Michigan	Blues
45	(Canada)	Marc-Andre Gaudet	D	L	23	2024	Saint-Ignace, New Brunswick	Blues
13	(Canada)	Kale Kessy	LW	L	33	2025	Shaunavon, Saskatchewan	Thunderbirds
48	(Russia)	Arseni Koromyslov	D	L	23	2026	Moscow, Russia	Blues
18	(Slovakia)	Juraj Pekarcik	LW	L	21	2025	Trstena, Slovakia	Blues
22	(United States)	Dylan Peterson	C	R	24	2024	Roseville, California	Blues
5	(United States)	Colin Ralph	D	L	21	2026	Maple Grove, Minnesota	Blues
26	(Sweden)	Simon Robertsson	RW	L	23	2024	Piteå, Sweden	Blues
30	(Russia)	Georgi Romanov	G	L	26	2025	Yekaterinburg, Russia	Blues
43	(Sweden)	Calle Rosen	D	L	32	2025	Växjö, Sweden	Blues
21	(Czech Republic)	Jakub Stancl	LW	L	21	2025	Prague, Czech Republic	Blues
28	(Sweden)	Otto Stenberg	C	L	21	2025	Stenungsund, Sweden	Blues
70	(Sweden)	Oskar Sundqvist	C	R	32	2026	Boden, Sweden	Blues
77	(Canada)	Felix Trudeau	LW	L	24	2026	Terrebonne, Quebec	Blues
17	(United States)	T. J. Tynan	C	R	34	2026	Orland Park, Illinois	Thunderbirds
88	(United States)	Chris Wagner (C)	RW	R	35	2025	Walpole, Massachusetts	Thunderbirds
12	(Australia)	Nathan Walker	LW	L	32	2021	Cardiff, United Kingdom	Blues

=== Team captains ===
- Brent Regner, 2016–17
- Paul Thompson, 2018–20
- Tommy Cross, 2021–23
- Matthew Peca, 2023–26
- Chris Wagner, 2026–present

=== Retired numbers ===
- #2: Eddie Shore
- #23: Rob Murray

Note: Shore's number was retired by the Springfield Indians, and Murray's by the Springfield Falcons; the Thunderbirds continue to honor both numbers. Former AHL president Jack Butterfield and vice president Gordie Anziano, longtime Springfield residents, as well as former Indians' general manager and Falcons founder Bruce Landon, and Willie O'Ree, the first African American to play in the AHL, have been honored with banners raised with the retired numbers.

=== Notable alumni ===
Players playing at least 100 games in Springfield and 100 games in major leagues.

- Josh Brown
- Bobby Farnham
- Dryden Hunt
- Juho Lammikko
- Steven Santini
- Mackenzie MacEachern

== Team records ==
Single season
Goals: 44, Adam Gaudette (2023–24)
Goals by a Rookie: 19, Owen Tippett (2019–20)
Power Play Goals: 15, Adam Gaudette (2023-24)
Short Handed Goals: 6, Anthony Greco (2017–18)
Assists: 44, Sam Anas (2021–22)
Points: 71, Adam Gaudette (2023-24)
Penalty Minutes: 147, Sena Acolatse (2016–17)
+/-: 23, Ian McCoshen (2016–17)
Appearances by a Goalie: 47, Joel Hofer (2022–23)
GAA:2.21, Charlie Lindgren (2021–22)
SV%:.925 Charlie Lindgren (2021–22)
Shutouts: 5, Joel Hofer (2022–23)

Career
Games: 323, Hugh McGing
Penalty Minutes: 238, Paul Thompson
Goaltending Wins: 45, Joel Hofer
Shutouts: 6 Joel Hofer
Goals: 85, Anthony Greco
Assists: 150, Matthew Peca
Points: 233, Matthew Peca
Power Play Goals: 20, Dryden Hunt
Short Handed Goals: 16, Anthony Greco
