= 2023–24 Hershey Bears season =

Hockey team season

2023–24 Hershey Bears
- Calder Cup champions
- Eastern Conference champions
- Atlantic Division champions
- League: 1st AHL
- Division: 1st Atlantic
- Conference: 1st Eastern
- 2023–24 record: 53–14–0–5 (111 pts)
- Home record: 29–7–0-0
- Road record: 24–7–0-5
- Goals for: 229
- Goals against: 151

Team information
- General manager: Bryan Helmer (de facto - VP of Hockey Operations)
- Coach: Todd Nelson
- Assistant coach: Patrick Wellar; Nick Bootland
- Captain: Dylan McIlrath
- Alternate captains: Aaron Ness; Mike Vecchione
- Arena: Giant Center
- Average attendance: 9,439

Team leaders
- Goals: Ethen Frank (29)
- Assists: Joe Snively (45)
- Points: Joe Snively (59)
- Penalty minutes: Dylan McIlrath (100)
- Wins: Hunter Shepard (27)
- Goals against average: Hunter Shepard (2.26)

The 2023–24 Hershey Bears season was the franchise's 86th season in the American Hockey League (AHL), starting on October 14, 2023, and ending during the Calder Cup playoffs. They play their home games at Giant Center.

On April 2, 2024, the Bears clinched a playoff berth for the third consecutive season following a 1–0 win over the Lehigh Valley Phantoms. In that same game, they clinched their division.

The Bears finished the season as Atlantic Division champions, their second in franchise history, and Macgregor Kilpatrick Trophy winners for the fourth time in franchise history, with a record-setting 111 points from 53 wins, 15 losses, and 5 shootout losses, their 53 wins also serving as a new AHL record under a 72 game season.

The Bears would win the Calder Cup in back to back years, beating the Coachella Valley Firebirds in 6 games.

== Standings ==
y– indicates team has clinched division and a playoff spot
x– indicates team has clinched a playoff spot
e– indicates team has been eliminated from playoff contention

=== Division ===
Atlantic Division	GP	W	L	OTL	SOL	Pts	Pts%	GF	GA
y–Hershey Bears (WSH)	72	53	14	0	5	111	.771	229	151
x–Providence Bruins (BOS)	72	42	21	6	3	93	.646	239	208
x–Wilkes-Barre/Scranton Penguins (PIT)	72	39	24	8	1	87	.604	211	194
x–Charlotte Checkers (FLA)	72	39	26	7	0	85	.590	217	203
x–Hartford Wolf Pack (NYR)	72	34	28	7	3	78	.542	204	219
x–Lehigh Valley Phantoms (PHI)	72	32	31	6	3	73	.507	191	217
e–Springfield Thunderbirds (STL)	72	30	37	3	2	65	.451	226	244
e–Bridgeport Islanders (NYI)	72	25	38	7	2	59	.410	162	222

=== Conference ===
Eastern Conference	GP	W	L	OTL	SOL	Pts	Pts%	GF	GA
y–Hershey Bears (WSH)	72	53	14	0	5	111	.771	229	151
x–Providence Bruins (BOS)	72	42	21	6	3	93	.646	239	208
y–Cleveland Monsters (CBJ)	72	40	24	5	3	88	.611	233	238
x–Rochester Americans (BUF)	72	39	23	7	3	88	.611	234	239
x–Wilkes-Barre/Scranton Penguins (PIT)	72	39	24	8	1	87	.604	211	194
x–Syracuse Crunch (TBL)	72	39	24	4	5	87	.604	220	203
x–Charlotte Checkers (FLA)	72	39	26	7	0	85	.590	217	203
x–Belleville Senators (OTT)	72	38	28	3	3	82	.569	209	211
x–Toronto Marlies (TOR)	72	34	26	10	2	80	.556	249	220
x–Hartford Wolf Pack (NYR)	72	34	28	7	3	78	.542	204	219
e–Utica Comets (NJD)	72	32	29	5	6	75	.521	221	226
x–Lehigh Valley Phantoms (PHI)	72	32	31	6	3	73	.507	191	217
e–Laval Rocket (MTL)	72	33	31	6	2	74	.514	235	242
e–Springfield Thunderbirds (STL)	72	30	37	3	2	65	.451	226	244
e–Bridgeport Islanders (NYI)	72	25	38	7	2	59	.410	162	222

== Roster ==
=== 2024 roster ===
Updated April 29, 2024.

No.	Nat	Player	Pos	S/G	Age	Acquired	Birthplace	Contract
1	(Canada)	Garin Bjorklund	G	L	24	2022	Calgary, Alberta	Capitals
36	(Canada)	Andrew Cristall	RW	L	21	2024	Vancouver, British Columbia	Capitals
26	(United States)	Logan Day	D	R	31	2022	Seminole, Florida	Bears
18	(France)	Pierrick Dube	RW	R	25	2023	Lyon, France	Capitals
20	(Canada)	Tyson Empey	F	L	31	2023	Swift Current, Saskatchewan	Bears
28	(United States)	Ethen Frank	C	R	28	2022	Papillion, Nebraska	Capitals
35	(United States)	Mitch Gibson	G	L	27	2023	Phoenixville, Pennsylvania	Capitals
7	(Sweden)	Hardy Haman Aktell	D	L	28	2023	Kåge, Sweden	Capitals
25	(Canada)	Ryan Hofer	C	L	24	2023	Headingley, Manitoba	Capitals
15	(Canada)	Jimmy Huntington	C	L	27	2023	Laval, Quebec	Bears
6	(Canada)	Vincent Iorio	D	R	23	2022	Coquitlam, British Columbia	Capitals
5	(Canada)	Lucas Johansen	D	L	28	2017	Port Moody, British Columbia	Capitals
29	(Canada)	Hendrix Lapierre	C	L	24	2022	Gatineau, Quebec	Capitals
4	(United States)	Nick Leivermann	D	L	27	2023	Eden Prairie, Minnesota	Bears
12	(United States)	Alex Limoges	LW	L	28	2023	Boulder, Colorado	Capitals
2	(Canada)	Jake Massie	D	L	29	2021	St-Lazare, Quebec	Bears
47	(United States)	Jon McDonald	D	L	28	2023	Livonia, Michigan	Bears
42	(Canada)	Dylan McIlrath (C)	D	R	34	2021	Winnipeg, Manitoba	Capitals
10	(Russia)	Ivan Miroshnichenko	LW	R	22	2023	Ussuriysk, Russia	Capitals
27	(United States)	Aaron Ness (A)	D	L	36	2022	Bemidji, Minnesota	Bears
39	(United States)	Kevin O'Neil	RW	R	28	2023	Latham, New York	Bears
34	(Russia)	Dmitry Osipov	RW	R	29	2023	Moscow, Russia	Bears
11	(Canada)	Matthew Phillips	RW	R	28	2024	Calgary, Alberta	Capitals
22	(United States)	Chase Priskie	D	R	30	2023	Pembroke Pines, Florida	Capitals
65	(United States)	Garrett Roe	C	L	38	2023	Vienna, Virginia	Bears
38	(Canada)	Henrik Rybinski	RW	R	25	2022	Vancouver, British Columbia	Capitals
30	(United States)	Hunter Shepard	G	L	30	2020	Cohasset, Minnesota	Capitals
21	(United States)	Joe Snively	LW	L	30	2019	Herndon, Virginia	Capitals
31	(Canada)	Clay Stevenson	G	L	27	2022	Drayton Valley, Alberta	Capitals
45	(Canada)	Matthew Strome	LW	L	27	2022	Mississauga, Ontario	Bears
24	(Canada)	Riley Sutter	RW	R	26	2019	Calgary, Alberta	Capitals
41	(Sweden)	Alexander Suzdalev	LW	L	22	2023	Khabarovsk, Russia	Capitals
37	(United States)	Colin Swoyer	D	R	28	2023	Hinsdale, Illinois	Bears
44	(Russia)	Bogdan Trineyev	LW	R	24	2023	Voronezh, Russia	Capitals
19	(United States)	Mike Vecchione (A)	RW	R	33	2021	Saugus, Massachusetts	Bears

== Playoffs ==
=== Game log ===
2024 Game Log – Playoffs
Eastern Conference First Round vs. (A6) Lehigh Valley Phantoms: Bears won 3–1

#	Date	Visitor	Score	Home	OT	Starting Goalie	Attendance	Series	Recap
1	May 1	Lehigh Valley	1–6	Hershey		Shepard	8,038	1–0	Recap
2	May 4	Lehigh Valley	2–4	Hershey		Shepard	10,520	2–0	Recap
3	May 8	Hershey	0–2	Lehigh Valley		Shepard	6,240	2–1	Recap
4	May 11	Hershey	5–3	Lehigh Valley		Shepard	7,089	3–1	Recap

Eastern Conference Second Round vs. (A5) Hartford Wolf Pack: Bears won 3–0

#	Date	Visitor	Score	Home	OT	Starting Goalie	Attendance	Series	Recap
1	May 16	Hartford	1–6	Hershey		Shepard	8,384	1–0	Recap
2	May 18	Hartford	2–4	Hershey		Shepard	10,714	2–0	Recap
3	May 22	Hershey	4–1	Hartford		Shepard	3,954	3–0	Recap

Eastern Conference Finals vs. (N1) Cleveland Monsters: Bears won 4–3

#	Date	Visitor	Score	Home	OT	Starting Goalie	Attendance	Series	Recap
1	May 30	Cleveland	4–5	Hershey	OT	Shepard	9,229	0–1	Recap
2	June 1	Cleveland	2–3	Hershey	OT	Shepard	10,562	0–2	Recap
3	June 4	Hershey	6–2	Cleveland		Shepard	14,675	0–3	Recap
4	June 6	Hershey	2–3	Cleveland		Shepard	12,814	3–1	Recap
5	June 8	Hershey	1–5	Cleveland		Shepard	13,159	3–2	Recap
6	June 10	Cleveland	3–2	Hershey	OT	Shepard	9,511	3–3	Recap
7	June 12	Cleveland	2–3	Hershey	OT	Shepard	10,520	4–3	Recap

Calder Cup Finals vs. (P1) Coachella Valley Firebirds: Hershey won series 4–2

#	Date	Visitor	Score	Home	OT	Starting Goalie	Attendance	Series	Recap
1	June 14	Coachella Valley	4–3	Hershey		Shepard	10,154	0–1	Recap
2	June 16	Coachella Valley	2–5	Hershey		Shepard	10,507	1–1	Recap
3	June 18	Hershey	2-6	Coachella Valley		Shepard	9.034	1-2	Recap
4	June 20	Hershey	3-2	Coachella Valley		Shepard	10,087	2-2	Recap
5	June 22	Hershey	3-2	Coachella Valley		Shepard	10,087	3-2	Recap
6	June 24	Coachella Valley	4-5	Hershey	OT	Shepard	11,013	4-2	Recap

Legend: = Win = Loss
