= 2024 Calder Cup playoffs =

American Hockey League postseason tournament

Tournament details
- Dates: April 23 – June 24, 2024
- Teams: 23

Final positions
- Champions: Hershey Bears
- Runners-up: Coachella Valley Firebirds

Tournament statistics
- Scoring leader(s): Hendrix Lapierre (Bears) (22 points)

Awards
- MVP: Hendrix Lapierre (Bears)

The 2024 Calder Cup playoffs was the postseason tournament of the American Hockey League (AHL) to determine the winner of the Calder Cup, which is awarded to the AHL playoff champions from the 2023–24 AHL season.

All teams except the bottom two teams of the Atlantic, North, and Central divisions, as well as the bottom three teams of the Pacific division qualified for the playoffs. Each division has a best-of-three series in the first round to determine the top 16 teams for the division semifinals, with various teams receiving byes based on regular season performance.

The 16 teams that remain—four from each division—will play a best-of-five series in the division semifinals, with the playoffs continuing with another best-of-five series for the division finals and a best-of-seven series for the conference finals and Calder Cup finals.

For the first time since 1991, the finals featured the same teams as the previous year, the Coachella Valley Firebirds and Hershey Bears. Hershey would repeat as champions, defeating Coachella Valley in six games.

== Playoff format ==
The AHL will continue to use the same playoff format used since 2022. The playoff field will include the top six finishers in the eight-team Atlantic Division, the top five finishers each in the seven-team North and Central Divisions, and the top seven teams in the 10-team Pacific Division. First-round match-ups will be best-of-three series; the two highest seeds in the Atlantic, the three highest seeds in each of the North and Central, and the first-place team in the Pacific will receive byes into the best-of-five Division Semifinals, with the first-round winners re-seeded in each division. The division finals will also be best-of-five series, followed by best-of-seven conference finals and a best-of-seven Calder Cup finals series.

== Playoff seeds ==
After the 2023–24 AHL regular season, 23 teams qualified for the playoffs. The Hershey Bears were the first team to clinch a playoff spot on March 10, and they later earned the regular season title on April 13.

=== Eastern Conference ===
==== Atlantic Division ====
1. Hershey Bears, Macgregor Kilpatrick Trophy winners – 111 points (.771)
2. Providence Bruins – 93 points (.646)
3. Wilkes-Barre/Scranton Penguins – 87 points (.604)
4. Charlotte Checkers – 85 points (.590)
5. Hartford Wolf Pack – 78 points (.542)
6. Lehigh Valley Phantoms – 73 points (.507)

==== North Division ====
1. Cleveland Monsters – 88 points (.611), 36 ROWs
2. Rochester Americans – 88 points (.611), 35 ROWs
3. Syracuse Crunch – 87 points (.604)
4. Belleville Senators – 82 points (.569)
5. Toronto Marlies – 80 points (.556)

=== Western Conference ===
==== Central Division ====
1. Milwaukee Admirals – 97 points (.674)
2. Grand Rapids Griffins – 86 points (.597)
3. Rockford IceHogs – 85 points (.590)
4. Texas Stars – 72 points (.500)
5. Manitoba Moose – 71 points (.493)

==== Pacific Division ====
1. Coachella Valley Firebirds – 103 points (.715)
2. Tucson Roadrunners – 92 points (.639)
3. Ontario Reign – 91 points (.632)
4. Colorado Eagles – 87 points (.604), 34 RWs
5. Abbotsford Canucks – 87 points (.604), 29 RWs
6. Bakersfield Condors – 84 points (.583)
7. Calgary Wranglers – 79 points (.549)

== Bracket ==
First round April 23–28
A3	Wilkes-Barre/Scranton	0
A6	Lehigh Valley	2
A4	Charlotte	1
A5	Hartford	2
N4	Belleville	2
N5	Toronto	1
C4	Texas	2
C5	Manitoba	0
P2	Tucson	0
P7	Calgary	2
P3	Ontario	2
P6	Bakersfield	0
P4	Colorado	1
P5	Abbotsford	2

Division semifinals April 26 – May 12
A1	Hershey	3
A6	Lehigh Valley	1
Atlantic Division
A2	Providence	1
A5	Hartford	3
N1	Cleveland	3
N4	Belleville	1
North Division
N2	Rochester	2
N3	Syracuse	3
C1	Milwaukee	3
C4	Texas	2
Central Division
C2	Grand Rapids	3
C3	Rockford	1
P1	Coachella Valley	3
P7	Calgary	1
Pacific Division
P3	Ontario	3
P5	Abbotsford	0

Division finals May 15–26
A1	Hershey	3
A5	Hartford	0
Eastern Conference
N1	Cleveland	3
N3	Syracuse	0
C1	Milwaukee	3
C2	Grand Rapids	2
Western Conference
P1	Coachella Valley	3
P3	Ontario	0

Conference finals May 29 – June 12
A1	Hershey	4
N1	Cleveland	3
P1	Coachella Valley	4
C1	Milwaukee	1

Calder Cup finals June 14–24
A1	Hershey	4
P1	Coachella Valley	2

== First round ==
=== Eastern Conference ===
==== (A3) Wilkes-Barre/Scranton Penguins vs. (A6) Lehigh Valley Phantoms ====
April 24	Lehigh Valley Phantoms	2–1	Wilkes-Barre/Scranton Penguins	Mohegan Sun Arena at Casey Plaza	Recap
Adam Brooks (1) - 14:37		First period	No Scoring
Rhett Gardner (1) - 0:58		Second period	18:16 - Ville Koivunen (1)
No Scoring		Third period	No Scoring
Cal Petersen ( 21 saves / 22 shots )		Goalie stats	Joel Blomqvist ( 30 saves / 32 shots )

April 26	Wilkes-Barre/Scranton Penguins	4–5	OT	Lehigh Valley Phantoms	PPL Center	Recap
Valtteri Puustinen (1) - 3:13		First period		No Scoring
Radim Zohorna (1) - 14:06; Jack Rathbone (1) - 17:58		Second period		9:19 - Ronnie Attard (1)
Radim Zohorna (2) - 16:12		Third period		12:15 - Emil Andrae (1); 12:37 - Tanner Laczynski (1); 16:46 - Tanner Laczynski (2)
No scoring		First overtime period		2:11 - Jacob Gaucher (1)
Joel Blomqvist ( 29 saves / 34 shots )		Goalie stats		Cal Petersen ( 24 saves / 28 shots )

Lehigh Valley won series 2–0

==== (A4) Charlotte Checkers vs. (A5) Hartford Wolf Pack ====
April 25	Hartford Wolf Pack	1–3	Charlotte Checkers	Bojangles Coliseum	Recap
Riley Nash (1) - pp - 8:15		First period	13:09 - pp - Zac Dalpe (1)
No scoring		Second period	No scoring
No scoring		Third period	16:46 - sh - Will Lockwood (1); 19:34 - en - Rasmus Asplund (1)
Dylan Garand (38 saves / 40 shots)		Goalie stats	Spencer Knight (22 saves / 23 shots)

April 27	Hartford Wolf Pack	3–2	OT	Charlotte Checkers	Bojangles Coliseum	Recap
No scoring		First period		4:42 - Gerald Mayhew (1)
Nic Petan (1) - pp - 8:21		Second period		15:58 - pp - Justin Sourdif (1)
Ryder Korczak (1) - 3:06		Third period		No scoring
Alex Belzile (1) - 8:11		First overtime period		No scoring
Dylan Garand (30 saves / 32 shots)		Goalie stats		Spencer Knight (27 saves / 30 shots)

April 28	Hartford Wolf Pack	3–1	Charlotte Checkers	Bojangles Coliseum	Recap
Jaroslav Chmelar (1) - 10:10		First period	No Scoring
No Scoring		Second period	No Scoring
Riley Nash (2) - pp - 4:21; Brett Berard (1) - sh - 14:52		Third period	15:37 - pp - Brendan Perlini (1)
Dylan Garand ( 38 saves / 39 shots )		Goalie stats	Magnus Hellberg ( 18 saves / 21 shots)

Hartford won series 2–1

==== (N4) Belleville Senators vs. (N5) Toronto Marlies ====
April 24	Toronto Marlies	1–3	Belleville Senators	CAA Arena	Recap
Marshall Rifai (1) - 3:36		First period	16:33 - Zack Ostapchuk (1)
No Scoring		Second period	0:48 - Tyler Kleven (1); 10:31 Josh Currie (1)
No Scoring		Third period	No Scoring
Dennis Hildeby ( 35 saves / 38 shots )		Goalie stats	Mads Sogaard ( 17 saves / 18 shots )

April 26	Belleville Senators	3–4	OT	Toronto Marlies	Coca-Cola Coliseum	Recap
No Scoring		First period		0:59 - Joseph Blandisi (1)
Donovan Sebrango (1) - 9:50; Garrett Pilon (1) - pp - 19:13		Second period		3:07 - Kyle Clifford (1); 16:24 - Marshall Rifai (2)
Garrett Pilon (2) - pp - 19:40		Third period		No Scoring
No scoring		First overtime period		0:50 - Dylan Gambrell (1)
Mads Sogaard ( 24 saves / 28 shots )		Goalie stats		Dennis Hildeby ( 31 saves / 34 shots )

April 28	Toronto Marlies	3–4	OT	Belleville Senators	CAA Arena	Recap
No Scoring		First period		2:21 - Bokondji Imama (1)
Marshall Rifai (3) - 1:00; Logan Shaw (1) - sh - 17:42		Second period		9:00 - Josh Currie (2); 10:00 - Rourke Chartier (1)
Matteo Pietroniro (1) - 13:19		Third period		No scoring
No scoring		First overtime period		2:17 - Garrett Pilon (3)
Dennis Hildeby ( 20 saves / 24 shots )		Goalie stats		Mads Sogaard ( 18 saves / 21 shots )

Belleville won series 2–1

=== Western Conference ===
==== (C4) Texas Stars vs. (C5) Manitoba Moose ====
April 23	Manitoba Moose	3–6	Texas Stars	H-E-B Center at Cedar Park	Recap
Daniel Torgersson (1) - 15:54		First period	16:31 - Mavrik Bourque (1)
Nikita Chibrikov (1) - pp - 15:39		Second period	01:42 - Curtis McKenzie (1); 08:22 - Michael Karow (1); 10:31 - Christian Kyrou (1)
Parker Ford (1) - 06:19		Third period	07:27 - Mavrik Bourque (2); 19:11 - en - Matej Blumel (1)
Thomas Milic ( 30 saves / 35 shots )		Goalie stats	Remi Poirier ( 21 saves / 24 shots )

April 25	Manitoba Moose	0–2	Texas Stars	H-E-B Center at Cedar Park	Recap
No scoring		First period	12:51 - pp - Fredrik Karlstrom (1)
No scoring		Second period	No scoring
No scoring		Third period	2:31 - pp - Fredrik Karlstrom (2)
Thomas Milic ( 20 saves / 22 shots )		Goalie stats	Remi Poirier ( 41 saves / 41 shots )

Texas won series 2–0

==== (P2) Tucson Roadrunners vs. (P7) Calgary Wranglers ====
April 24	Calgary Wranglers	2–0	Tucson Roadrunners	Tucson Convention Center	Recap
No scoring		First period	No scoring
Cole Schwindt (1) - 6:14		Second period	No scoring
Matthew Coronato (1) - en - 19:19		Third period	No scoring
Dustin Wolf (46 saves / 46 shots)		Goalie stats	Matt Villalta (33 saves / 34 shots)

April 26	Calgary Wranglers	4–3	Tucson Roadrunners	Tucson Convention Center	Recap
Sam Morton (1) - pp - 17:09		First period	16:17 - pp - Dylan Guenther (1)
Riley Damiani (1) - 7:00; Ilya Solovyov (1) - 12:59		Second period	12:33 - Justin Kirkland (1)
William Stromgren (1) - 9:56		Third period	12:29 - Hunter Drew (1)
Dustin Wolf (40 saves / 43 shots)		Goalie stats	Matt Villalta (20 saves / 24 shots)

Calgary won series 2–0

==== (P3) Ontario Reign vs. (P6) Bakersfield Condors ====
April 24	Bakersfield Condors	1–5	Ontario Reign	Toyota Arena	Recap
No scoring		First period	No scoring
No scoring		Second period	5:43 - Andre Lee (1); 7:24 - pp - Tyler Madden (1); 11:57 - sh - Joe Hicketts (1); 18:17 - pp - Akil Thomas (1)
Lane Pederson (1) - pp - 10:14		Third period	13:33 - Tyler Madden (2)
Jack Campbell (30 saves / 35 shots)		Goalie stats	Erik Portillo (30 saves / 31 shots)

April 27	Ontario Reign	3–1	Bakersfield Condors	Mechanics Bank Arena	Recap
No scoring		First period	6:10 - pp - Seth Griffith (1)
Taylor Ward (1) - 2:42		Second period	No scoring
Tyler Madden (3) - 16:54; Charles Hudon (1) - en - 19:59		Third period	No scoring
Erik Portillo (23 saves / 24 shots)		Goalie stats	Olivier Rodrigue (31 saves / 33 shots)

Ontario won series 2–0

==== (P4) Colorado Eagles vs. (P5) Abbotsford Canucks ====
April 24	Abbotsford Canucks	4–2	Colorado Eagles	Blue Arena	Recap
Arshdeep Bains (1) - 1:56		First period	11:50 - pp - Callahan Burke (1)
Sheldon Dries (1) - 7:13; Chase Wouters (1) - 19:33		Second period	13:23 - Ivan Ivan (1)
Linus Karlsson (1) - en - 19:34		Third period	No scoring
Zach Sawchenko (28 saves / 30 shots)		Goalie stats	Ivan Prosvetov (14 saves / 17 shots)

April 26	Abbotsford Canucks	4–5	OT	Colorado Eagles	Blue Arena	Recap
Aatu Raty (1) - 19:10		First period		13:09 - Nikolai Kovalenko (1); 14:25 - Tanner Kero (1)
Christian Wolanin (1) - 10:53; Linus Karlsson (2) - pp - 18:02		Second period		6:06 - Callahan Burke (2); 9:28 - Spencer Smallman (1)
Akito Hirose (1) - 10:47		Third period		No scoring
No scoring		First overtime period		3:06 - Chris Wagner (1)
Zach Sawchenko (24 saves / 29 shots)		Goalie stats		Ivan Prosvetov (20 saves / 24 shots)

April 28	Abbotsford Canucks	2–1	OT	Colorado Eagles	Blue Arena	Recap
Arshdeep Bains (2) - 14:42		First period		No scoring
No scoring		Second period		No scoring
No scoring		Third period		17:44 - pp - Brad Hunt (1)
Chase Wouters (2) - 8:46		First overtime period		No scoring
Zach Sawchenko (47 saves / 48 shots)		Goalie stats		Ivan Prosvetov (38 saves / 40 shots)

Abbotsford won series 2–1

== Division semifinals ==
=== Eastern Conference ===
==== (A1) Hershey Bears vs. (A6) Lehigh Valley Phantoms ====
May 1	Lehigh Valley Phantoms	1–2	Hershey Bears	Giant Center	Recap
No scoring		First period	3:29 - Hendrix Lapierre (1)
No scoring		Second period	17:17 - Henrik Rybinski (1)
Tanner Laczynski (3) - 15:28		Third period	No scoring
Cal Petersen ( 26 saves / 28 shots )		Goalie stats	Hunter Shepard ( 30 saves / 31 shots )

May 4	Lehigh Valley Phantoms	1–5	Hershey Bears	Giant Center	Recap
Hunter McDonald (1) - 18:45		First period	4:47 - Ethen Frank (1); 8:18 - Ethen Frank (2)
No scoring		Second period	4:48 - Henrik Rybinski (2); 15:24 - Alex Limoges (1)
No scoring		Third period	16:30 - Hendrix Lapierre (2)
Cal Petersen ( 11 saves / 15 shots )		Goalie stats	Hunter Shepard ( 30 saves / 31 shots )

May 8	Hershey Bears	0–2	Lehigh Valley Phantoms	PPL Center	Recap
No scoring		First period	5:44 - pp - Emil Andrae (2); 7:28 - pp - Olle Lycksell (1)
No scoring		Second period	No scoring
No scoring		Third period	No scoring
Hunter Shepard ( 20 saves / 22 shots )		Goalie stats	Cal Petersen ( 22 saves / 22 shots )

May 11	Hershey Bears	5–3	Lehigh Valley Phantoms	PPL Center	Recap
Ivan Miroshnichenko (1) - 9:18; Pierrick Dube (1) - 15:08		First period	9:01 - Rhett Gardner (2); 12:18 - Garrett Wilson (1)
Ivan Miroshnichenko (2) - 2:36; Ethen Frank (3) - pp - 10:57		Second period	16:17 - Tanner Laczynski (4)
Hardy Haman Aktell (1) - 14:52		Third period	No scoring
Hunter Shepard (29 saves / 32 shots)		Goalie stats	Cal Petersen (22 saves / 27 shots)

Hershey won series 3–1

==== (A2) Providence Bruins vs. (A5) Hartford Wolf Pack ====
May 1	Hartford Wolf Pack	4–3	Providence Bruins	Amica Mutual Pavilion	Recap
Jake Leschyshyn (1) - 1:07; Blake Hillman (1) - 5:27		First period	No scoring
Tyler Pitlick (1) - 19:26		Second period	6:19 - Jimmy Lambert (1); 13:41 - Jimmy Lambert (2)
Anton Blidh (1) - 1:28		Third period	19:12 - Patrick Brown (1)
Dylan Garand (32 saves / 35 shots)		Goalie stats	Brandon Bussi (23 saves / 27 shots)

May 3	Hartford Wolf Pack	0–6	Providence Bruins	Amica Mutual Pavilion	Recap
No scoring		First period	2:43 - Vincent Arseneau (1); 13:44 - Jayson Megna (1); 14:08 - Brett Harrison (1)
No scoring		Second period	7:38 - pp - Ian Mitchell (1); 15:49 - Vincent Arseneau (2)
No scoring		Third period	0:52 - pp - Ian Mitchell (2)
Dylan Garand (34 saves / 40 shots)		Goalie stats	Brandon Bussi (34 saves / 34 shots)

May 8	Providence Bruins	2–3	OT	Hartford Wolf Pack	XL Center	Recap
Marc McLaughlin (1) - 5:23; Jayson Megna (2) - 18:07		First period		7:04 - Riley Nash (3); 8:39 - pp - Brennan Othmann (1)
No scoring		Second period		No scoring
No scoring		Third period		No scoring
No scoring		First overtime period		4:52 - Riley Nash (4)
Brandon Bussi ( 22 saves / 25 shots )		Goalie stats		Dylan Garand ( 33 saves / 35 shots )

May 10	Providence Bruins	1–2	OT	Hartford Wolf Pack	XL Center	Recap
No scoring		First period		14:30 - pp - Jake Leschyshyn (2)
No scoring		Second period		No scoring
John Farinacci (1) - 10:01		Third period		No scoring
No scoring		First overtime period		9:41 - Jake Leschyshyn (3)
Brandon Bussi ( 27 saves / 29 shots )		Goalie stats		Dylan Garand ( 26 saves / 27 shots )

Hartford won series 3–1

==== (N1) Cleveland Monsters vs. (N4) Belleville Senators ====
May 1	Cleveland Monsters	1–2	Belleville Senators	CAA Arena	Recap
No scoring		First period	No scoring
Josh Dunne (1) - pp - 11:27		Second period	4:01 - pp - Egor Sokolov (1); 10:13 - Angus Crookshank (1)
No scoring		Third period	No scoring
Jet Greaves ( 24 saves / 26 shots )		Goalie stats	Mads Sogaard ( 31 saves / 32 shots )

May 3	Cleveland Monsters	4–3	OT	Belleville Senators	CAA Arena	Recap
Tyler Angle (1) - 7:52; Jake Gaudet (1) - 16:39		First period		2:05 - Wyatt Bongiovanni (1); 15:20 - Cole Reinhardt (1)
Josh Dunne (2) - 3:38		Second period		No scoring
No scoring		Third period		9:05 - pp - Stephen Halliday (1)
Cole Clayton (1) - 4:06		First overtime period		No scoring
Jet Greaves ( 36 saves / 39 shots )		Goalie stats		Mads Sogaard ( 31 saves / 35 shots )

May 8	Belleville Senators	2–3	2OT	Cleveland Monsters	Rocket Mortgage FieldHouse	Recap
Josh Currie (3) - 15:55		First period		5:01 - Mikael Pyyhtia (1); 9:54 - pp - David Jiricek (1)
No scoring		Second period		No scoring
Donovan Sebrango (2) - 6:08		Third period		No scoring
No scoring		Second overtime period		4:41 - Owen Sillinger (1)
Mads Sogaard ( 41 saves / 44 shots )		Goalie stats		Jet Greaves ( 39 saves / 41 shots )

May 10	Belleville Senators	1–3	Cleveland Monsters	Rocket Mortgage FieldHouse	Recap
Stephen Halliday (2) - pp - 14:02		First period	1:39 - Marcus Bjork (1)
No scoring		Second period	14:00 - Owen Sillinger (2)
No scoring		Third period	19:57 - en - Justin Pearson (1)
Leevi Merilainen ( 27 saves / 29 shots )		Goalie stats	Jet Greaves ( 32 saves / 33 shots )

Cleveland won series 3–1

==== (N2) Rochester Americans vs. (N3) Syracuse Crunch ====
April 26	Syracuse Crunch	2–3	Rochester Americans	Blue Cross Arena	Recap
No scoring		First period	1:01 - Anton Wahlberg (1); 13:38 - pp - Noah Ostlund (1)
Dylan Duke (1) - 13:21		Second period	No scoring
Jordy Bellerive (1) - 7:59		Third period	10:21 - Isak Rosen (1)
Brandon Halverson ( 23 saves / 26 shots )		Goalie stats	Devon Levi ( 35 saves / 37 shots)

April 28	Syracuse Crunch	4–3	OT	Rochester Americans	Blue Cross Arena	Recap
No scoring		First period		10:40 - pp - Michael Mersch (1)
Jordy Bellerive (2) - 19:13		Second period		13:00 - Linus Weissbach (1)
Gage Goncalves (1) - 4:59; Sean Day (1) - 9:03		Third period		16:06 - Mason Jobst (1)
Gabriel Fortier (1) - 10:56		First overtime period		No scoring
Brandon Halverson ( 24 saves / 27 shots )		Goalie stats		Devon Levi ( 30 saves / 34 shots )

May 2	Rochester Americans	1–2	2OT	Syracuse Crunch	Upstate Medical University Arena	Recap
No scoring		First period		No scoring
Isak Rosen (2) -ps- 19:05		Second period		11:10 - Alex Barre-Boulet (1)
No scoring		Third period		No scoring
No scoring		Second overtime period		10:18 - Waltteri Merela (1)
Devon Levi ( 60 saves / 62 shots )		Goalie stats		Brandon Halverson ( 33 saves / 34 shots )

May 4	Rochester Americans	4–3	OT	Syracuse Crunch	Upstate Medical University Arena	Recap
No scoring		First period		4:00 - Cole Koepke (1)
No scoring		Second period		3:53 - Waltteri Merela (2); 7:02 - pp - Alex Barre-Boulet (2)
Brandon Biro (1) - 0:19; Joseph Cecconi (1) - 10:20; Brandon Biro (2) - 14:48		Third period		No scoring
Brett Murray (1) - 11:46		First overtime period		No scoring
Devon Levi (41 saves / 44 shots )		Goalie stats		Brandon Halverson ( 43 saves / 47 shots )

May 10	Syracuse Crunch	5–2	Rochester Americans	Blue Cross Arena	Recap
Declan Carlile (1) - 2:28; Cole Koepke (2) - 9:43		First period	17:33 - Jeremy Davies (2)
Waltteri Merela (3) - 8:35		Second period	10:33 - pp -- Michael Mersch (2)
Cole Koepke (3) - 14:50; Felix Robert (1) - en - 16:49		Third period	No scoring
Brandon Halverson ( 16 saves / 18 shots )		Goalie stats	Devon Levi ( 15 saves / 19 shots )

Syracuse won series 3–2

=== Western Conference ===
==== (C1) Milwaukee Admirals vs. (C4) Texas Stars ====
May 2	Milwaukee Admirals	3–6	Texas Stars	H-E-B Center at Cedar Park	Recap
Philip Tomasino (1) - 6:17; Fedor Svechkov (1) - 10:57		First period	12:52 - Curtis McKenzie (2)
Cal O'Reilly (1) - 18:15		Second period	2:47 - Matthew Seminoff (1); 8:28 - Mathias Emilio Pettersen (1)
No scoring		Third period	4:27 - Matej Blumel (2); 12:53 - Mathias Emilio Pettersen (2); 19:22 - en - Mavrik Bourque (3)
Yaroslav Askarov (24 saves / 29 shots)		Goalie stats	Remi Poirier (15 saves / 18 shots)

May 4	Milwaukee Admirals	1–4	Texas Stars	H-E-B Center at Cedar Park	Recap
No scoring		First period	15:12 - Alex Petrovic (1)
No scoring		Second period	10:21 - pp - Kyle McDonald (1)
Ozzy Wiesblatt (1) - 8:56		Third period	11:25 - Matej Blumel (3); 19:11 - en - Justin Hryckowian (1)
Yaroslav Askarov (18 saves / 21 shots)		Goalie stats	Remi Poirier (32 saves / 33 shots)

May 8	Texas Stars	3–5	Milwaukee Admirals	UW–Milwaukee Panther Arena	Recap
Justin Hryckowian (2) - pp - 6:14; Kyle McDonald (2) - pp - 16:48		First period	3:31 - Marc Del Gaizo (1); 11:19 - pp - Philip Tomasino (2); 12:22 - pp - Zachary L'Heureux (1)
No scoring		Second period	2:50 - sh - Roland McKeown (1); 15:44 - Marc Del Gaizo (2)
Oskar Back (1) - 0:08		Third period	No scoring
Remi Poirier ( 14 saves / 19 shots ) Ben Kraws ( 7 saves / 7 shots )		Goalie stats	Troy Grosenick ( 28 saves / 31 shots )

May 10	Texas Stars	1–4	Milwaukee Admirals	UW–Milwaukee Panther Arena	Recap
No scoring		First period	6:41 - pp - Zachary L'Heureux (2); 7:28 - Zachary L'Heureux (3)
Matej Blumel (4) - 4:53		Second period	No scoring
No scoring		Third period	12:22 - Philip Tomasino (3); 18:42 - en - Juuso Parssinen (1)
Remi Poirier (19 saves / 22 shots)		Goalie stats	Troy Grosenick (24 saves / 25 shots)

May 12	Texas Stars	3–5	Milwaukee Admirals	UW–Milwaukee Panther Arena	Recap
Matej Blumel (5) - 5:37		First period	0:43 - Zachary L'Heureux (4); 0:58 - Zachary L'Heureux (5); 13:46 - Cal O'Reilly (2)
No Scoring		Second period	No Scoring
Oskar Back (2) - 1:57; Fredrik Karlstrom (3) - 17:56		Third period	7:15 - Fedor Svechkov (4); 17:18 - Reid Schaefer (1)
Ben Kraws ( 6 saves / 9 shots ) Remi Poirier ( 14 saves / 15 shots)		Goalie stats	Troy Grosenick ( 28 saves / 31 shots )

Milwaukee won series 3–2

==== (C2) Grand Rapids Griffins vs. (C3) Rockford IceHogs ====
April 27	Grand Rapids Griffins	3–2	OT	Rockford IceHogs	BMO Center	Recap
No scoring		First period		4:24 - Michal Teply (1)
No scoring		Second period		11:20 - Zach Sanford (1)
Dominik Shine (1) - 3:05; Amadeus Lombardi (1) - 15:35		Third period		No scoring
Jonatan Berggren (1) - 4:14		First overtime period		No scoring
Sebastian Cossa (20 saves / 22 shots)		Goalie stats		Jaxson Stauber (34 saves / 37 shots)

May 1	Rockford IceHogs	5–1	Grand Rapids Griffins	Van Andel Arena	Recap
Ethan Del Mastro (1) - 11:47; Mike Hardman (1) - pp - 19:59		First period	10:52 - Austin Czarnik (1)
Michal Teply (2) - 1:25		Second period	No scoring
Mike Hardman (2) - 4:17; Luke Philp (1) - pp - 15:34		Third period	No scoring
Drew Commesso (27 saves / 28 shots)		Goalie stats	Sebastian Cossa (20 saves / 25 shots)

May 3	Rockford IceHogs	3–4	OT	Grand Rapids Griffins	Van Andel Arena	Recap
No scoring		First period		No scoring
Rem Pitlick (1) - 19:29		Second period		0:24 - Marco Kasper (1)
Zach Sanford (2) - 16:22; Jackson Cates (1) - 17:21		Third period		0:57 - Austin Czarnik (2); 9:25 - Elmer Soderblom (1)
No scoring		First overtime period		8:12 - Jonatan Berggren (2)
Drew Commesso (38 saves / 42 shots)		Goalie stats		Sebastian Cossa (27 saves / 30 shots)

May 5	Grand Rapids Griffins	4–2	Rockford IceHogs	BMO Center	Recap
Carter Mazur (1) - 14:22; Austin Czarnik (3) - 16:03		First period	14:11 - pp - Lukas Reichel (1)
No scoring		Second period	No scoring
Jonatan Berggren (3) - 5:00; Marco Kasper (2) - en - 18:55		Third period	6:40 - Lukas Reichel (2)
Sebastian Cossa (21 saves / 23 shots)		Goalie stats	Drew Commesso (21 saves / 24 shots)

Grand Rapids won series 3–1

==== (P1) Coachella Valley Firebirds vs. (P7) Calgary Wranglers ====
May 3	Coachella Valley Firebirds	1–4	Calgary Wranglers	Scotiabank Saddledome	Recap
No scoring		First period	No scoring
Ryker Evans (1) - en - 13:41		Second period	4:10 - Adam Klapka (1)
No scoring		Third period	3:16 - Mitch McLain (1); 18:23 - en - Sam Morton (2); 19:07 - en, sh - Yan Kuznetsov (1)
Chris Driedger ( 23 saves / 25 shots )		Goalie stats	Dustin Wolf ( 35 saves / 35 shots )

May 5	Coachella Valley Firebirds	4–3	OT	Calgary Wranglers	Scotiabank Saddledome	Recap
No scoring		First period		No scoring
Kole Lind (1) - pp - 16:21		Second period		No scoring
Andrew Poturalski (1) - 8:29; Max McCormick (1) - 14:33		Third period		1:41 - Cole Schwindt (2); 4:19 - Sam Morton (3); 12:18 - Cole Schwindt (3)
Devin Shore (1) - 7:54		First overtime period		No scoring
Chris Driedger ( 30 saves / 33 shots )		Goalie stats		Dustin Wolf ( 26 saves / 30 shots )

May 8	Calgary Wranglers	5–7	Coachella Valley Firebirds	Acrisure Arena	Recap
Jonathan Aspirot (1) - pp - 5:47		First period	11:20 - John Hayden (1); 12:02 - Jacob Melanson (1)
Adam Klapka (2) - pp - 2:55		Second period	6:01 - Marian Studenic (1)
Jeremie Poirier (1) - pp - 0:57; Cole Schwindt (4) - pp - 7:03; Jakob Pelletier (1) - 11:44		Third period	6:19 - sh - Marian Studenic (2); 8:16 - pp - Devin Shore (2); 9:18 - pp - Max McCormick (2); 19:50 - en - Max McCormick (3)
Dustin Wolf ( 30 saves / 36 shots )		Goalie stats	Chris Driedger ( 31 saves / 36 shots )

May 10	Calgary Wranglers	0–3	Coachella Valley Firebirds	Acrisure Arena	Recap
No scoring		First period	6:40 - Cale Fleury (1); 15:38 - Shane Wright (1)
No scoring		Second period	No scoring
No scoring		Third period	7:13 - Devin Shore (3)
Dustin Wolf ( 29 saves / 32 shots )		Goalie stats	Chris Driedger ( 31 saves / 31 shots )

Coachella Valley won series 3–1

==== (P3) Ontario Reign vs. (P5) Abbotsford Canucks ====
May 1	Abbotsford Canucks	1–3	Ontario Reign	Toyota Arena	Recap
No scoring		First period	No scoring
No scoring		Second period	12:05 - T. J. Tynan (1)
Max Sasson (1) - 8:15		Third period	4:55 - Alex Turcotte (1); 11:29 - Nikita Pavlychev (1)
Zach Sawchenko ( 18 saves / 21 shots )		Goalie stats	Erik Portillo ( 23 saves / 24 shots )

May 5	Abbotsford Canucks	0–4	Ontario Reign	Toyota Arena	Recap
No scoring		First period	8:11 - pp - Akil Thomas (2); 10:42 - Charles Hudon (2)
No scoring		Second period	No scoring
No scoring		Third period	14:34 - Andre Lee (2); 16:55 - Tyler Madden (4)
Zach Sawchenko (22 saves / 25 shots)		Goalie stats	Erik Portillo (29 saves / 29 shots)

May 8	Ontario Reign	4–3	Abbotsford Canucks	Abbotsford Centre	Recap
No scoring		First period	8:14 - Aatu Raty (2); 13:32 - Christian Wolanin (2)
Samuel Fagemo (1) - 8:59; Charles Hudon (3) - 9:36; Taylor Ward (2) - 10:20; Andre Lee (3) - 17:31		Second period	14:49 - Marc Gatcomb (1)
No scoring		Third period	No scoring
Erik Portillo ( 25 saves / 28 shots )		Goalie stats	Zach Sawchenko ( 19 saves / 23 shots )

Ontario won series 3–0

== Division finals ==
=== Eastern Conference ===
==== (A1) Hershey Bears vs. (A5) Hartford Wolf Pack ====
May 16	Hartford Wolf Pack	1–6	Hershey Bears	Giant Center	Recap
No scoring		First period	7:40 - Chase Priskie (1)
Jake Leschyshyn (4) - 5:42		Second period	3:58 - pp - Ethen Frank (4); 13:28 - pp - Alex Limoges (2); 14:35 - Garrett Roe (1)
No scoring		Third period	11:01 - Ivan Miroshnichenko (3); 13:07 - sh - Jimmy Huntington (1)
Olof Lindbom ( 23 saves / 28 shots ) Talyn Boyko ( 1 save / 2 shots )		Goalie stats	Hunter Shepard ( 13 saves / 14 shots )

May 18	Hartford Wolf Pack	2–4	Hershey Bears	Giant Center	Recap
No Scoring		First period	2:50 - pp - Ivan Miroshnichenko (3)
No Scoring		Second period	13:32 - Ivan Miroshnichenko (4)
Jake Leschyshyn (5) - 17:02; Anton Blidh (2) - 19:11		Third period	4:25 - Ethen Frank (5); 8:30 - Hendrix Lapierre (3)
Dylan Garand ( 23 saves / 27 shots )		Goalie stats	Hunter Shepard ( 22 saves / 24 shots )

May 22	Hershey Bears	4–1	Hartford Wolf Pack	XL Center	Recap
No Scoring		First period	13:24 - Jaroslav Chmelar (2)
Garrett Roe (2) - 1:56; Garrett Roe (3) - 7:29		Second period	No scoring
Matthew Strome (1) - pp - 11:52; Mike Vecchione (1) - en - 17:58		Third period	No scoring
Hunter Shepard ( 17 saves / 18 shots )		Goalie stats	Dylan Garand ( 28 saves / 31 shots )

Hershey won series 3–0

==== (N1) Cleveland Monsters vs. (N3) Syracuse Crunch ====
May 16	Syracuse Crunch	0–1	Cleveland Monsters	Rocket Mortgage FieldHouse	Recap
No scoring		First period	No scoring
No scoring		Second period	No scoring
No scoring		Third period	4:46 - sh - Justin Pearson (2)
Brandon Halverson ( 23 saves / 24 shots )		Goalie stats	Jet Greaves ( 28 saves / 28 shots )

May 18	Syracuse Crunch	1–4	Cleveland Monsters	Rocket Mortgage FieldHouse	Recap
Devante Stephens (1) - pp - 8:07		First period	11:29 - Billy Sweezey (1); 15:18 - Hunter McKown (1)
No Scoring		Second period	No Scoring
No Scoring		Third period	4:37 - Jakub Zboril (1); 15:14 - Alex Whelan (1)
Brandon Halverson ( 24 saves / 27 shots )		Goalie stats	Jet Greaves ( 17 saves / 18 shots )

May 22	Cleveland Monsters	6–4	Syracuse Crunch	Upstate Medical University Arena	Recap
Jake Gaudet (2) - 14:16		First period	16:38 - pp - Alex Barre-Boulet (3)
Stefan Matteau (1) - pp - 11:02		Second period	16:47 - pp - Cole Koepke (4); 17:52 - Jordy Bellerive (3)
Alex Whelan (2) - 1:02; Josh Dunne (3) - 9:29; Luca Del Bel Belluz (1) - 17:42; Roman Ahcan (1) - en - 18:59		Third period	16:32 - Alex Barre-Boulet (4)
Malcolm Subban ( 25 saves / 29 shots )		Goalie stats	Matt Tomkins ( 21 saves / 26 shots )

Cleveland won series 3–0

=== Western Conference ===
==== (C1) Milwaukee Admirals vs. (C2) Grand Rapids Griffins ====
May 15	Grand Rapids Griffins	4–2	Milwaukee Admirals	UW–Milwaukee Panther Arena	Recap
Carter Mazur (2) - 4:48		First period	15:36 - Zachary L'Heureux (6)
Zach Aston-Reese (1) - 3:50		Second period	16:18 - Philip Tomasino (4)
Marco Kasper (3) - 9:57; Joel L'Esperance (1) - pp, en - 19:26		Third period	No scoring
Sebastian Cossa (25 saves / 27 shots)		Goalie stats	Troy Grosenick (10 saves / 13 shots)

May 20	Grand Rapids Griffins	2–5	Milwaukee Admirals	UW–Milwaukee Panther Arena	Recap
No scoring		First period	4:39 - Egor Afanasyev (1); 12:45 - pp - Fedor Svechkov (3)
No scoring		Second period	15:21 - sh - Zachary L'Heureux (7)
Carter Mazur (3) - pp - 15:34; Dominik Shine (2) - 16:50		Third period	3:27 - Marc Del Gaizo (3); 19:01 - en - Jasper Weatherby (1)
Sebastian Cossa (21 saves / 25 shots)		Goalie stats	Yaroslav Askarov (27 saves / 29 shots)

May 22	Milwaukee Admirals	3–2	OT	Grand Rapids Griffins	Van Andel Arena	Recap
No scoring		First period		No scoring
Egor Afanasyev (2) - 2:50; Egor Afanasyev (3) - pp - 15:14		Second period		11:19 - William Wallinder (1)
No scoring		Third period		5:25 - Austin Czarnik (4)
Egor Afanasyev (4) - 4:40		First overtime period		No scoring
Yaroslav Askarov (25 saves / 27 shots)		Goalie stats		Sebastian Cossa (27 saves / 30 shots)

May 24	Milwaukee Admirals	2–4	Grand Rapids Griffins	Van Andel Arena	Recap
Egor Afanasyev (5) - 14:00		First period	No scoring
Joakim Kemell (1) - 8:38		Second period	No scoring
No scoring		Third period	8:03 - pp - Marco Kasper (4); 9:33 - pp - Joel L'Esperance (2); 10:06 - Jonatan Berggren (4); 11:33 - Jonatan Berggren (5)
Yaroslav Askarov (26 saves / 30 shots); Troy Grosenick (1 save / 1 shot)		Goalie stats	Sebastian Cossa (31 saves / 33 shots)

May 26	Grand Rapids Griffins	0–2	Milwaukee Admirals	UW–Milwaukee Panther Arena	Recap
No scoring		First period	4:53 - sh - Zachary L'Heureux (8)
No scoring		Second period	No scoring
No scoring		Third period	3:00 - Ryan Ufko (1)
Sebastian Cossa (34 saves / 36 shots)		Goalie stats	Troy Grosenick (30 saves / 30 shots)

Milwaukee won series 3–2

==== (P1) Coachella Valley Firebirds vs. (P3) Ontario Reign ====
May 15	Ontario Reign	2–3	Coachella Valley Firebirds	Acrisure Arena	Recap
Andre Lee (4) - 4:24		First period	14:37 - Max McCormick (4); 15:39 - Devin Shore (3)
No scoring		Second period	7:59 - Jimmy Schuldt (1)
Samuel Fagemo (2) - pp - 0:24		Third period	No scoring
Erik Portillo ( 12 saves / 15 shots )		Goalie stats	Chris Driedger ( 29 saves / 31 shots )

May 17	Ontario Reign	3–5	Coachella Valley Firebirds	Acrisure Arena	Recap
No scoring		First period	1:57 - John Hayden (2); 11:15 - Cale Fleury (2); 14:21 - pp - Jani Nyman (1)
Kevin Connauton (1) - 5:34		Second period	10:47 - Shane Wright (2)
Hayden Hodgson (1) - pp - 3:00; T. J. Tynan (2) - pp - 10:28		Third period	8:16 - pp - Cale Fleury (3)
Erik Portillo (23 saves / 28 shots)		Goalie stats	Chris Driedger (32 saves / 35 shots)

May 19	Coachella Valley Firebirds	3–2	Ontario Reign	Toyota Arena	Recap
No scoring		First period	6:17 - Alex Turcotte (2); 13:02 - Tyler Madden (5)
Kole Lind (2) - 5:41; Jimmy Schuldt (2) - 11:37		Second period	No scoring
Kole Lind (3) - 0:46		Third period	No scoring
Chris Driedger (22 saves / 24 shots)		Goalie stats	Erik Portillo (20 saves / 23 shots)

Coachella Valley won series 3–0

== Conference finals ==
=== Eastern Conference ===
==== (A1) Hershey Bears vs. (N1) Cleveland Monsters ====
May 30	Cleveland Monsters	4–5	OT	Hershey Bears	Giant Center	Recap
No scoring		First period		4:24 - Ethen Frank (6)
Hunter McKown (2) - pp - 3:31; Alex Whelan (3) - 4:52		Second period		6:15 - Aaron Ness (1); 17:12 - pp - Chase Priskie (2)
Trey Fix-Wolansky (1) - pp - 18:37; David Jiricek (2) - 19:40		Third period		8:43 - pp - Hendrix Lapierre (4)
No scoring		First overtime period		7:58 - Mike Vecchione (2)
Jet Greaves (30 saves / 35 shots)		Goalie stats		Hunter Shepard (21 saves / 25 shots)

June 1	Cleveland Monsters	2–3	OT	Hershey Bears	Giant Center	Recap
No scoring		First period		No scoring
Josh Dunne (4) - 18:49		Second period		14:35 - pp - Garrett Roe (4)
David Jiricek (3) - 18:27		Third period		11:21 - Ethen Frank (7)
No scoring		First overtime period		13:54 - Pierrick Dube (2)
Jet Greaves ( 27 saves / 30 shots )		Goalie stats		Hunter Shepard ( 34 saves / 36 shots )

June 4	Hershey Bears	6–2	Cleveland Monsters	Rocket Mortgage FieldHouse	Recap
Jimmy Huntington (2) - pp - 12:43		First period	No scoring
Ethen Frank (8) - pp - 5:45; Alex Limoges (3) - 17:14; Ivan Miroshnichenko (6) - 18:23; Joe Snively (1) - pp - 19:32		Second period	6:55 - Alex Whelan (4); 12:17 - pp - Trey Fix-Wolansky (2)
Henrik Rybinski (3) - en - 15:54		Third period	No scoring
Hunter Shepard ( 27 saves / 29 shots)		Goalie stats	Jet Greaves ( 20 saves / 25 shots); Malcolm Subban ( 4 saves / 4 shots )

June 6	Hershey Bears	2–3	Cleveland Monsters	Rocket Mortgage FieldHouse	Recap
Ethen Frank (9) - pp - 18:07		First period	2:10 - Josh Dunne (5)
No scoring		Second period	7:46 - Roman Ahcan (2)
Garrett Roe (5) - 5:55		Third period	5:10 - Jake Gaudet (3)
Hunter Shepard ( 28 saves / 31 shots )		Goalie stats	Jet Greaves ( 27 saves / 29 shots )

June 8	Hershey Bears	1–5	Cleveland Monsters	Rocket Mortgage FieldHouse	Recap
Logan Day (1) - 12:11		First period	No scoring
No scoring		Second period	2:48 - Alex Whelan (5); 9:35 - pp - Josh Dunne (6); 11:49 - Brendan Gaunce (1); 16:29 - Brendan Gaunce (2)
No scoring		Third period	15:58 - Josh Dunne (7)
Hunter Shepard ( 16 saves / 20 shots ) Clay Stevenson ( 4 saves / 5 shots )		Goalie stats	Jet Greaves ( 33 saves / 34 shots )

June 10	Cleveland Monsters	3–2	OT	Hershey Bears	Giant Center	Recap
Owen Sillinger (3) - pp - 17:14		First period		No scoring
No scoring		Second period		10:37 - Henrik Rybinski (4)
Brendan Gaunce (3) - 19:27		Third period		19:10 - Joe Snively (2)
Jake Christiansen (1) - 17:31		First overtime period		No scoring
Jet Greaves ( 29 saves / 31 shots )		Goalie stats		Hunter Shepard ( 29 saves / 32 shots )

June 12	Cleveland Monsters	2–3	OT	Hershey Bears	Giant Center	Recap
Trey Fix-Wolansky (3) - pp - 19:02		First period		19:41 - Logan Day (2)
No scoring		Second period		4:14 - pp - Pierrick Dube (3)
James Malatesta (1) - 14:08		Third period		No scoring
No scoring		First overtime period		7:38 - Garrett Roe (6)
Jet Greaves ( 27 saves / 30 shots )		Goalie stats		Hunter Shepard ( 42 saves / 44 shots )

Hershey won series 4–3

=== Western Conference ===
==== (P1) Coachella Valley Firebirds vs. (C1) Milwaukee Admirals ====
May 29	Milwaukee Admirals	1–2	Coachella Valley Firebirds	Acrisure Arena	Recap
No scoring		First period	14:55 - pp - John Hayden (3)
No scoring		Second period	No scoring
Zachary L'Heureux (9) - 5:20		Third period	8:49 - John Hayden (4)
Troy Grosenick ( 28 saves / 30 shots )		Goalie stats	Chris Driedger ( 37 saves / 38 shots )

May 31	Milwaukee Admirals	1–3	Coachella Valley Firebirds	Acrisure Arena	Recap
No scoring		First period	0:28 - Andrew Poturalski (2); 15:06 - pp - Ryker Evans (2)
Ozzy Wiesblatt (2) - 5:28		Second period	15:56 - Kole Lind (4)
No scoring		Third period	No scoring
Troy Grosenick ( 31 saves / 34 shots )		Goalie stats	Chris Driedger ( 31 saves / 32 shots )

June 4	Coachella Valley Firebirds	5–2	Milwaukee Admirals	UW–Milwaukee Panther Arena	Recap
Cale Fleury (4) - 0:31; Ryker Evans (3) - 9:03; Ryan Winterton (1) - 16:04		First period	No scoring
Max McCormick (5) - 1:34		Second period	8:35 - Marc Del Gaizo (4); 16:35 - Fedor Svechkov (4)
Jacob Melanson (2) - en - 17:32		Third period	No scoring
Chris Driedger ( 31 saves / 33 shots )		Goalie stats	Troy Grosenick ( 20 saves / 24 shots )

June 6	Coachella Valley Firebirds	2–7	Milwaukee Admirals	UW–Milwaukee Panther Arena	Recap
Connor Carrick (1) - 11:39; Logan Morrison (1) - 18:22		First period	7:26 - Wade Allison (1); 17:04 - Joakim Kemell (2)
No scoring		Second period	12:44 - pp - Fedor Svechkov (5); 19:17 - Zachary L'Heureux (10)
No scoring		Third period	13:11 - Philip Tomasino (5); 15:03 - en - Roland McKeown (2); 18:03 - pp - Fedor Svechkov (6)
Chris Driedger ( 23 saves / 29 shots )		Goalie stats	Troy Grosenick ( 23 saves / 25 shots )

June 8	Coachella Valley Firebirds	5–1	Milwaukee Admirals	UW–Milwaukee Panther Arena	Recap
John Hayden (5) - 2:33; Jimmy Schuldt (3) - 9:14; John Hayden (6) - pp - 17:04; Devin Shore (5) - pp - 19:17		First period	No scoring
John Hayden (7) - sh - 18:03		Second period	8:24 - pp - Joakim Kemell (3)
No scoring		Third period	No scoring
Chris Driedger ( 32 saves / 33 shots )		Goalie stats	Troy Grosenick ( 16 saves / 21 shots )

Coachella Valley won series 4–1

== Calder Cup finals ==
=== (A1) Hershey Bears vs. (P1) Coachella Valley Firebirds ===
June 14	Coachella Valley Firebirds	4–3	Hershey Bears	Giant Center	Recap
John Hayden (8) - sh - 6:34; Ryan Winterton (2) - 13:52		First period	1:15 - Joe Snively (3)
Ryan Winterton (3) - 9:49; John Hayden (9) - 15:11		Second period	12:51 - Hardy Haman Aktell (2)
No scoring		Third period	18:04 - pp - Hendrix Lapierre (5)
Chris Driedger ( 16 saves / 19 shots )		Goalie stats	Hunter Shepard ( 19 saves / 23 shots )

June 16	Coachella Valley Firebirds	2–5	Hershey Bears	Giant Center	Recap
No scoring		First period	5:51 - Ivan Miroshnichenko (7)
Luke Henman (1) - 2:42		Second period	13:01 - Jimmy Huntington (3); 16:42 - Pierrick Dube (4)
Marian Studenic (3) - 0:17		Third period	9:45 - Hardy Haman Aktell (3); 19:49 - en, sh - Hardy Haman Aktell (4)
Chris Driedger ( 16 saves / 20 shots )		Goalie stats	Hunter Shepard ( 32 saves / 34 shots )

June 18	Hershey Bears	2–6	Coachella Valley Firebirds	Acrisure Arena	Recap
Henrik Rybinski (5) - 8:50		First period	2:20 - pp - Max McCormick (6); 6:03 - Max McCormick (7)
Alex Limoges (4) - pp - 1:29		Second period	4:06 - Lleyton Roed (1); 16:00 - Ryan Winterton (4)
No scoring		Third period	7:01 - Shane Wright (3); 18:24 - en - Max McCormick (8)
Hunter Shepard ( 31 saves / 36 shots ) Clay Stevenson ( 5 saves / 5 shots )		Goalie stats	Chris Driedger ( 22 saves / 24 shots )

June 20	Hershey Bears	3–2	Coachella Valley Firebirds	Acrisure Arena	Recap
Ethen Frank (10) - 18:37		First period	No scoring
Hendrix Lapierre (6) - 18:00		Second period	9:40 - Shane Wright (4)
Joe Snively (4) - pp - 4:21		Third period	0:32 - Ryker Evans (4)
Hunter Shepard ( 22 saves / 24 shots )		Goalie stats	Chris Driedger ( 22 saves / 25 shots )

June 22	Hershey Bears	3–2	Coachella Valley Firebirds	Acrisure Arena	Recap
Jimmy Huntington (4) - 19:58		First period	10:05 - Kole Lind (5)
No scoring		Second period	No scoring
Hardy Haman Aktell (5) - 8:26; Jimmy Huntington (5) - 16:45		Third period	4:43 - Ryan Winterton (5)
Hunter Shepard ( 24 saves / 26 shots )		Goalie stats	Chris Driedger ( 17 saves / 20 shots )

June 24	Coachella Valley Firebirds	4–5	OT	Hershey Bears	Giant Center	Recap
Ryan Winterton (6) - 1:37		First period		5:51 - pp - Pierrick Dube (5); 19:24 - Hendrix Lapierre (7)
Marian Studenic (4) - 1:51; Ryan Winterton (6) - 7:59		Second period		13:52 - Pierrick Dube (6)
Cale Fleury (5) - 17:05		Third period		8:56 - Pierrick Dube (7)
No scoring		First overtime period		1:06 - Matt Strome (2)
Chris Driedger ( 17 saves / 22 shots )		Goalie stats		Hunter Shepard ( 17 saves / 21 shots )

Hershey won series 4–2

== Playoff statistical leaders ==
=== Leading skaters ===
These are the top ten skaters based on points. If there is a tie in points, goals take precedence over assists. Updated following games played on June 24, 2024.

Player	Team	GP	G	A	Pts	PIM
Hendrix Lapierre	Hershey Bears	20	7	15	22	6
Joe Snively	Hershey Bears	20	4	14	18	26
Ethen Frank	Hershey Bears	18	10	7	17	2
Cameron Hughes	Coachella Valley Firebirds	18	0	16	16	9
Zachary L'Heureux	Milwaukee Admirals	15	10	5	15	62
Cale Fleury	Coachella Valley Firebirds	18	5	9	14	8
Jimmy Huntington	Hershey Bears	20	5	9	14	12
Chase Priskie	Hershey Bears	20	2	12	14	6
John Hayden	Coachella Valley Firebirds	18	9	4	13	10
Devin Shore	Coachella Valley Firebirds	18	5	8	13	4

=== Leading goaltenders ===
This is a combined table of the top five goaltenders based on goals against average and the top five goaltenders based on save percentage with at least 60 minutes played. The table is initially sorted by goals against average, with the criterion for inclusion in bold.

Player	Team	GP	W	L	SA	GA	GAA	SV%	SO	TOI
Spencer Knight	Charlotte Checkers	2	1	1	53	4	**1.87**	**.925**	0	128:07
Brandon Bussi	Providence Bruins	4	1	3	115	9	**2.14**	**.922**	1	252:20
Erik Portillo	Ontario Reign	8	5	3	202	17	**2.16**	.916	1	471:44
Jet Greaves	Cleveland Monsters	13	8	5	405	30	**2.17**	**.926**	1	830:41
Brandon Halverson	Syracuse Crunch	7	3	4	203	17	**2.19**	.916	0	465:33
Devon Levi	Rochester Americans	5	2	3	196	15	2.57	**.923**	0	349:37
Dylan Garand	Hartford Wolf Pack	9	5	4	306	24	2.59	**.922**	0	555:19
Dustin Wolf	Calgary Wranglers	6	3	3	253	17	2.84	**.924**	1	359:38
