= Hendrix Lapierre =

Canadian ice hockey player (born 2002)

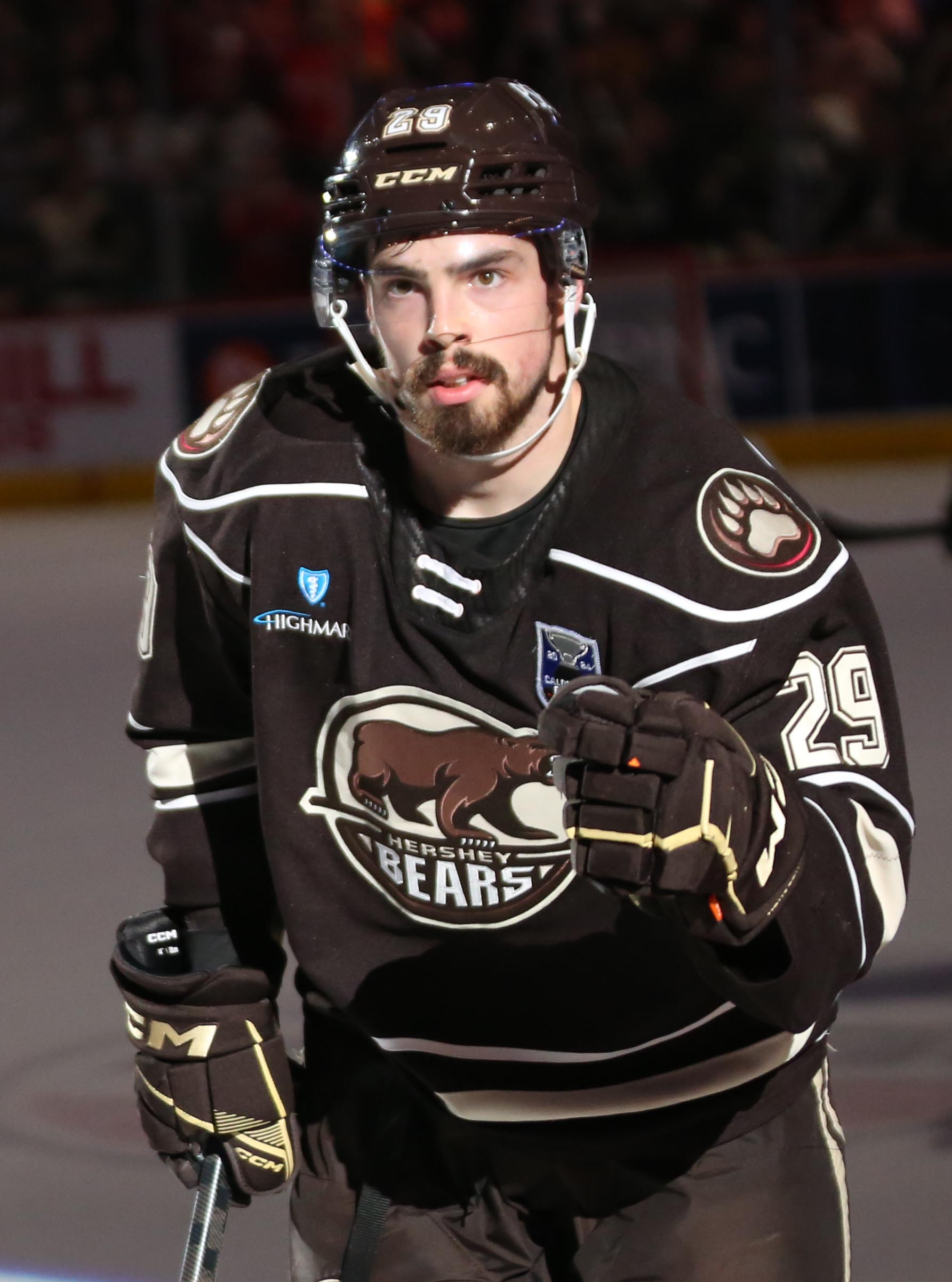
- Lapierre with the Hershey Bears in 2024
- Born: February 9, 2002 (age 24) Gatineau, Quebec, Canada
- Height: 6 ft 0 in (183 cm)
- Weight: 195 lb (88 kg; 13 st 13 lb)
- Position: Centre
- Shoots: Left
- NHL team Former teams: Pittsburgh Penguins; Washington Capitals
- NHL draft: 22nd overall, 2020; Washington Capitals
- Playing career: 2021–present

Hendrix Lapierre /ˌlɑːpiˈɛər/ (born February 9, 2002 in Gatineau, Québec) is a Canadian professional ice hockey player who is a centre for the Pittsburgh Penguins of the National Hockey League (NHL). Lapierre was selected 22nd overall by the Washington Capitals in the 2020 NHL entry draft.

== Playing career ==
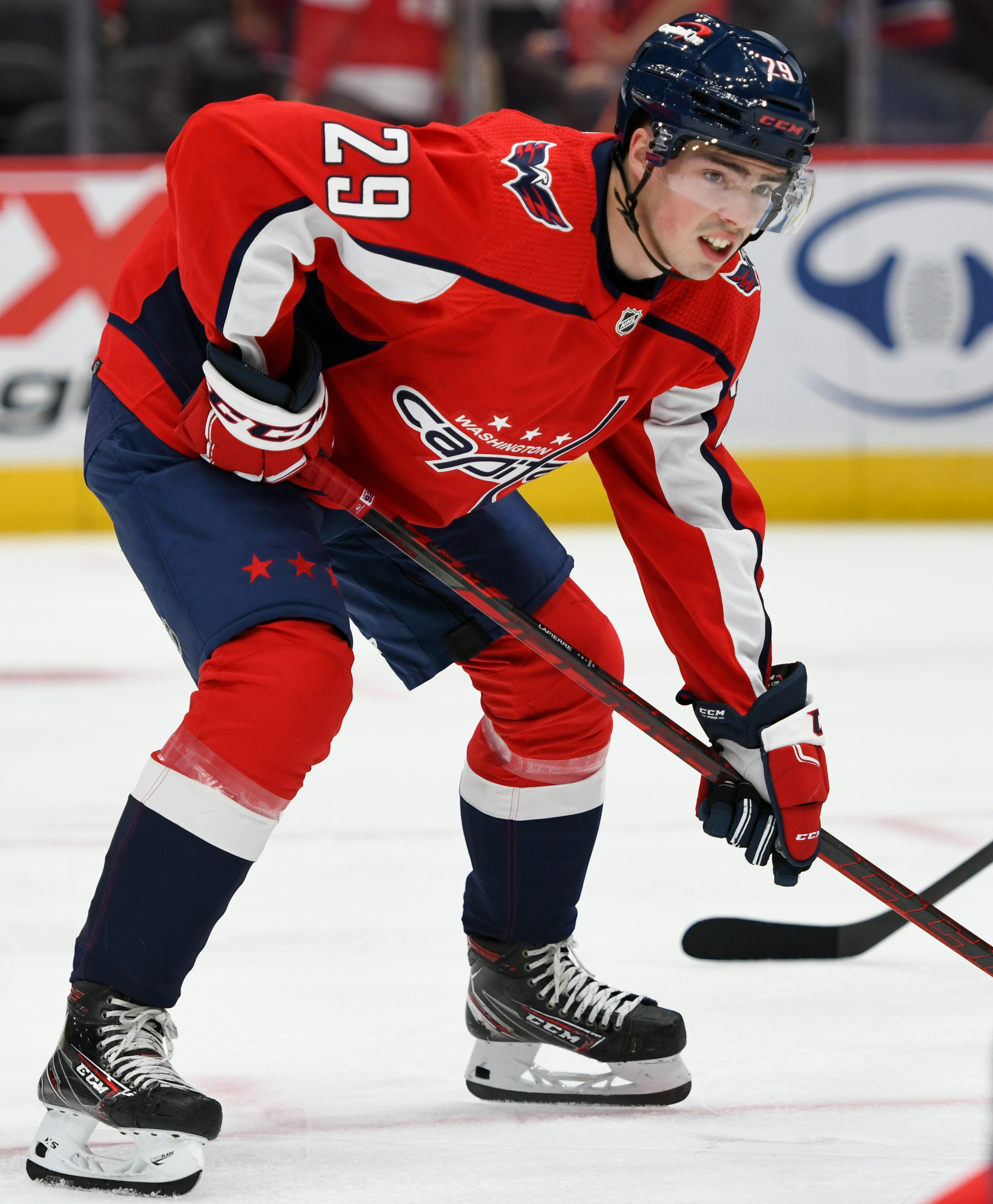
Lapierre in 2021

On October 6, 2020, Lapierre was selected by the Washington Capitals with the 22nd overall pick in the 2020 NHL entry draft. He was signed to a three-year, entry-level contract with the Capitals on October 27, 2020.

Following his third season of major junior hockey with the Chicoutimi Saguenéens of the Quebec Major Junior Hockey League (QMJHL), Lapierre was traded to Acadie–Bathurst Titan in exchange for two junior players and four draft selections on June 23, 2021.

Lapierre made his NHL debut for the Capitals on October 13, 2021, at home against the New York Rangers. He scored his first NHL goal in the second period of that game on an assist from T. J. Oshie.

In 2023, and 2024, Lapierre won the Calder Cup with the Hershey Bears, the farm team of the Washington Capitals. He was named the MVP of the 2024 Calder Cup playoffs.

On July 6, 2025, Lapierre re-signed with Washington on a one-year contract.

On June 25, 2026, Lapierre was traded to the Pittsburgh Penguins in exchange for a 2027 third-round pick and a 2028 fifth-round pick. On July 3, 2026, Lapierre signed a two-year contract with Pittsburgh.

== International play ==
Lapierre represented the Canada national under-18 team at the 2019 Hlinka Gretzky Cup.

== Career statistics ==
=== Regular season and playoffs ===
			Regular season					Playoffs
Season	Team	League	GP	G	A	Pts	PIM	GP	G	A	Pts	PIM
2017–18	Gatineau L'Intrépide	QMAAA	35	17	40	57	6	9	4	6	10	8
2018–19	Chicoutimi Saguenéens	QMJHL	48	13	32	45	18	4	3	2	5	2
2019–20	Chicoutimi Saguenéens	QMJHL	19	2	15	17	10	—	—	—	—	—
2020–21	Chicoutimi Saguenéens	QMJHL	21	8	23	31	12	9	5	7	12	4
2021–22	Washington Capitals	NHL	6	1	0	1	2	—	—	—	—	—
2021–22	Acadie–Bathurst Titan	QMJHL	40	21	30	51	22	8	4	7	11	2
2022–23	Hershey Bears	AHL	60	15	15	30	43	20	3	3	6	14
2023–24	Hershey Bears	AHL	21	5	12	17	6	20	7	15	22	6
2023–24	Washington Capitals	NHL	51	8	14	22	4	4	1	1	2	0
2024–25	Washington Capitals	NHL	27	0	8	8	4	—	—	—	—	—
2024–25	Hershey Bears	AHL	32	7	25	32	16	8	0	3	3	4
2025–26	Washington Capitals	NHL	74	4	12	16	31	—	—	—	—	—
NHL totals			158	13	34	47	41	4	1	1	2	0

=== International ===
Year	Team	Event	Result	GP	G	A	Pts	PIM
2019	Canada	HG18	2nd place, silver medalist(s)	5	3	8	11	4
Junior totals				5	3	8	11	4

== Awards and honours ==
Award	Year	Ref
QMJHL
QMJHL All-Rookie Team	2019	
Michel Bergeron Trophy	2019	
AHL
Calder Cup	2023, 2024	
Jack A. Butterfield Trophy	2024	

Awards and achievements
Preceded by Connor McMichael	Washington Capitals first-round draft pick 2020	Succeeded by Ivan Miroshnichenko
