= Pierrick Dubé =

French ice hockey player (born 2001)

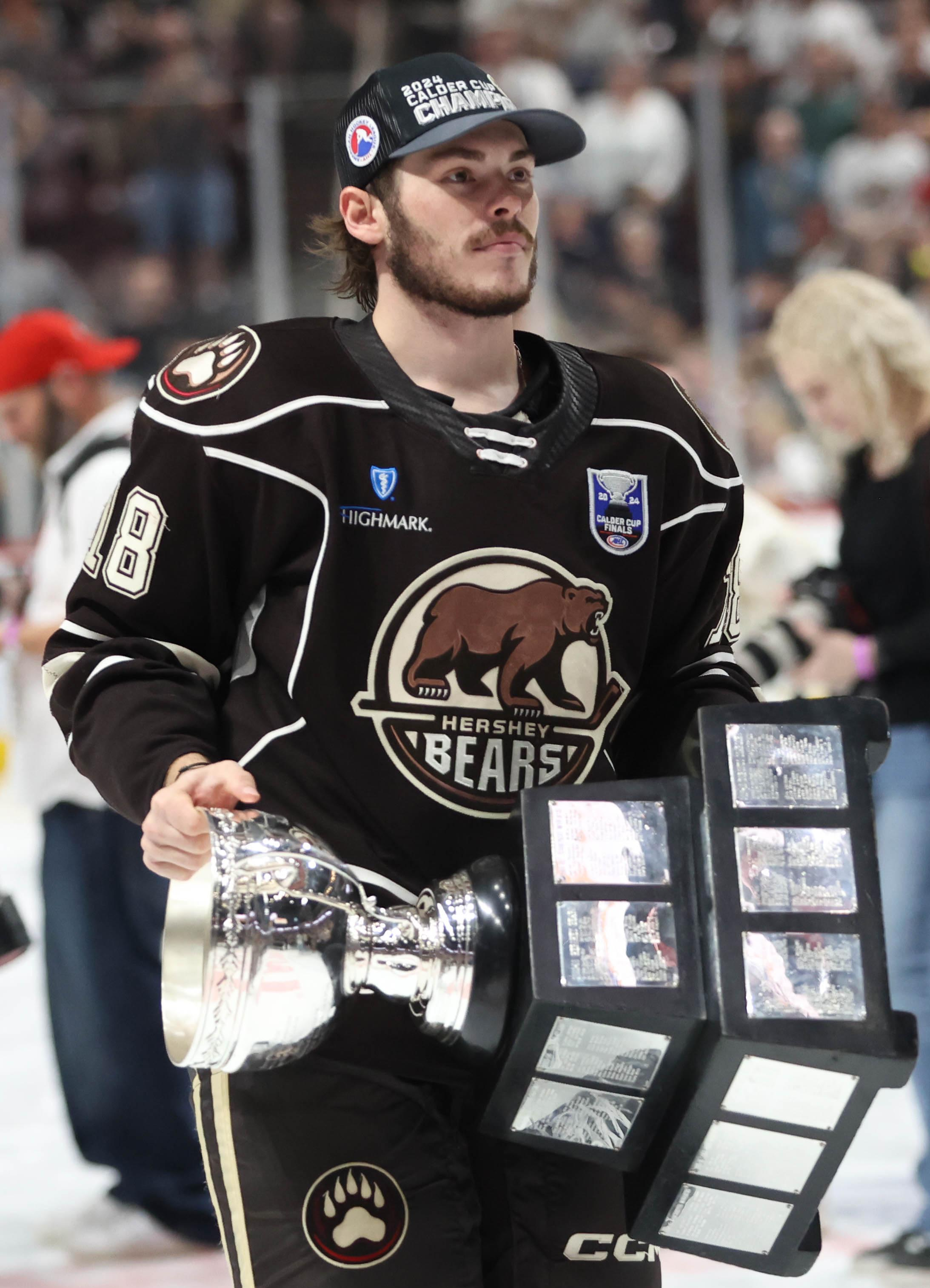
- Dubé holding the Calder Cup in 2024
- Born: 7 January 2001 (age 25) Lyon, France
- Height: 5 ft 9 in (175 cm)
- Weight: 172 lb (78 kg; 12 st 4 lb)
- Position: Right wing
- Shoots: Right
- AHL team Former teams: Free agent Washington Capitals; Traktor Chelyabinsk; SKA Saint Petersburg
- National team: France
- NHL draft: Undrafted
- Playing career: 2021–present

Pierrick Dubé (born 7 January 2001) is a French professional ice hockey right winger who is currently an unrestricted free agent. Dubé was undrafted and played within the Montreal Canadiens' system before joining the Washington Capitals organization.

== Playing career ==
Dubé played junior ice hockey with the Quebec Remparts, Chicoutimi Saguenéens, and Shawinigan Cataractes of the Quebec Major Junior Hockey League (QMJHL). During his final season of junior ice hockey, Dubé helped the Cataractes win the President's Cup, awarded to the QMJHL playoff champions.

After going undrafted, Dubé signed with the Trois-Rivières Lions of the ECHL and played with the team during the 2021–22 season. On 13 October 2022, he signed a professional tryout contract with the Laval Rocket of the American Hockey League (AHL) before signing a professional contract with the team.

On 1 July 2023, Dubé signed a two-year, entry-level contract with the Washington Capitals and was assigned to their AHL affiliate, the Hershey Bears. He was recalled from the Bears on 21 February 2024, and made his NHL debut three days later in a 3–2 overtime loss to the Florida Panthers.

On 4 June 2024, Dubé suffered a gruesome injury when he was struck in the face by a shot from Ethen Frank, during game three of the Eastern Conference Finals against the Cleveland Monsters. Losing "five or six teeth" along with "twelve pounds" over the next week, he missed the following three games. He returned eight days later for game seven and scored a goal in Hershey's series-clinching win.

As a free agent from the Capitals after not being tendered a qualifying offer, Dubé halted his career in North America and was signed to a one-year contract with Russian based, Traktor Chelyabinsk of the KHL, on 17 July 2025.

On 8 November 2025, Dubé was traded by Traktor Chelyabinsk to SKA Saint Petersburg in exchange for defenseman Nikita Smirnov and financial compensation. On 14 January 2026, Dubé's contract with the SKA hockey club has been terminated at the initiative of the player. On 21 January 2026, Dubé returned to North America and the AHL in agreeing to a contract for the remainder of the season with the Bridgeport Islanders, affiliate to the New York Islanders.

== Personal life ==
Dubé was born in Lyon, while his father, Roger, was playing professionally in France. With his family's support, Dubé moved to Canada at age 14 to continue his ice hockey development.

== Career statistics ==
=== Regular season and playoffs ===
			Regular season					Playoffs
Season	Team	League	GP	G	A	Pts	PIM	GP	G	A	Pts	PIM
2017–18	Quebec Remparts	QMJHL	39	3	1	4	2	6	0	0	0	2
2018–19	Quebec Remparts	QMJHL	64	17	11	28	28	7	2	0	2	4
2019–20	Quebec Remparts	QMJHL	56	19	26	45	40	—	—	—	—	—
2020–21	Quebec Remparts	QMJHL	10	5	4	9	0	—	—	—	—	—
2020–21	Chicoutimi Saguenéens	QMJHL	14	12	7	19	10	9	9	5	14	8
2021–22	Shawinigan Cataractes	QMJHL	36	19	25	44	24	16	12	6	18	22
2021–22	Trois-Rivières Lions	ECHL	10	1	3	4	2	—	—	—	—	—
2022–23	Trois-Rivières Lions	ECHL	9	9	5	14	10	—	—	—	—	—
2022–23	Laval Rocket	AHL	44	16	16	32	30	2	0	0	0	0
2023–24	Hershey Bears	AHL	66	28	20	48	53	17	7	3	10	20
2023–24	Washington Capitals	NHL	3	0	0	0	2	—	—	—	—	—
2024–25	Hershey Bears	AHL	58	19	21	40	44	8	2	1	3	8
2025–26	Traktor Chelyabinsk	KHL	21	7	7	14	14	—	—	—	—	—
2025–26	SKA Saint Petersburg	KHL	7	0	2	2	2	—	—	—	—	—
2025–26	Bridgeport Islanders	AHL	24	5	9	14	12	2	0	1	1	0
NHL totals			3	0	0	0	2	—	—	—	—	—
KHL totals			28	7	9	16	16	—	—	—	—	—

=== International ===
Year	Team	Event	Result	GP	G	A	Pts	PIM
2018	France	U18	10th	6	2	0	2	10
2019	France	U18 D1A	15th	5	3	4	7	0
2020	France	WJC D1B	18th	5	5	4	9	8
2024	France	OGQ	DNQ	3	1	4	5	0
Junior totals				16	10	8	18	18
Senior totals				3	1	4	5	0

== Awards and honours ==
Award	Year
AHL
Calder Cup	2024
