= Hardy Häman Aktell =

Swedish ice hockey player

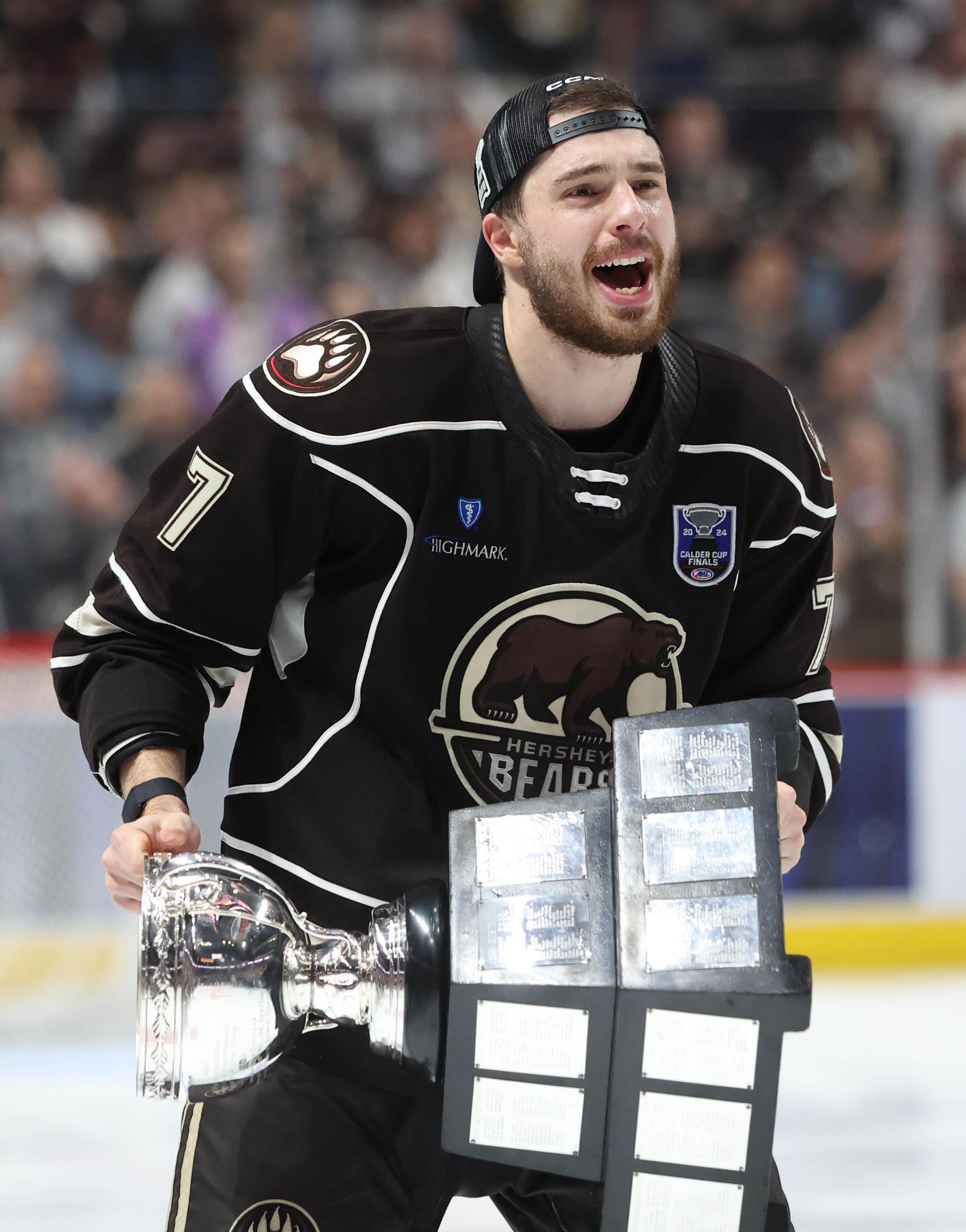
- Häman Aktell holding the Calder Cup in 2024
- Born: July 4, 1998 (age 28) Kåge, Sweden
- Height: 6 ft 4 in (193 cm)
- Weight: 220 lb (100 kg; 15 st 10 lb)
- Position: Defence
- Shoots: Right
- NL team Former teams: SC Bern; Växjö Lakers; Washington Capitals
- NHL draft: 108th overall, 2016; Nashville Predators
- Playing career: 2018–present

Hardy Häman Aktell (born July 4, 1998) is a Swedish professional ice hockey player for SC Bern in the National League (NL). Häman Aktell was drafted 108th overall in the 2016 NHL entry draft by the Nashville Predators.

== Playing career ==
Following the 2022–23 season, helping Växjö Lakers to claim their second Le Mat Trophy in three years, Häman Aktell as an unsigned free agent from the Nashville Predators was signed to a one-year, entry-level contract with the Washington Capitals on April 27, 2023.

During the 2023–24 season, Häman Aktell was recalled and made his NHL debut on October 21, 2023. He registered 1 assist through 6 appearances with the Capitals before returning to the Hershey Bears. On June 24, 2024, he won the Calder Cup with the Bears, Washington's primary affiliate.

Continuing his tenure with the Hershey Bears in the 2024–25 season, Häman Aktell registered 9 assists through 27 games on the blueline. Unable to climb the depth chart within the Capitals organization, Häman Aktell was placed on unconditional waivers and was mutually released from the remainder of his contract on 1 February 2025. Returning to Europe, Häman Aktell was promptly signed to a three-year contract in joining Swiss based club, SC Bern of the NL, on 4 February 2025.

== Career statistics ==
			Regular season					Playoffs
Season	Team	League	GP	G	A	Pts	PIM	GP	G	A	Pts	PIM
2015–16	Skellefteå AIK	J20	2	1	0	1	2	1	0	0	0	0
2016–17	Skellefteå AIK	J20	3	1	2	3	6	—	—	—	—	—
2017–18	Skellefteå AIK	J20	14	2	2	4	29	3	1	1	2	0
2018–19	IF Björklöven	Allsv	34	1	5	6	28	—	—	—	—	—
2018–19	Vännäs HC	Div.1	2	0	1	1	2	—	—	—	—	—
2019–20	IF Björklöven	Allsv	45	6	10	16	22	2	0	0	0	0
2020–21	Växjö Lakers	SHL	50	3	8	11	12	14	2	1	3	2
2021–22	Växjö Lakers	SHL	50	5	11	16	47	1	0	4	4	0
2022–23	Växjö Lakers	SHL	51	9	27	36	22	18	3	4	7	10
2023–24	Hershey Bears	AHL	55	2	9	11	33	17	5	4	9	14
2023–24	Washington Capitals	NHL	6	0	1	1	2	—	—	—	—	—
2024–25	Hershey Bears	AHL	27	0	9	9	18	—	—	—	—	—
2024–25	SC Bern	NL	2	0	1	1	2	3	0	1	1	4
SHL totals			151	17	46	63	141	33	5	9	14	12
NHL totals			6	0	1	1	2	—	—	—	—	—

== Awards and honours ==
Award	Year
SHL
Le Mat Trophy champion	2021, 2023
AHL
Calder Cup	2024
