= Josh Dunne =

American ice hockey player (born 1998)

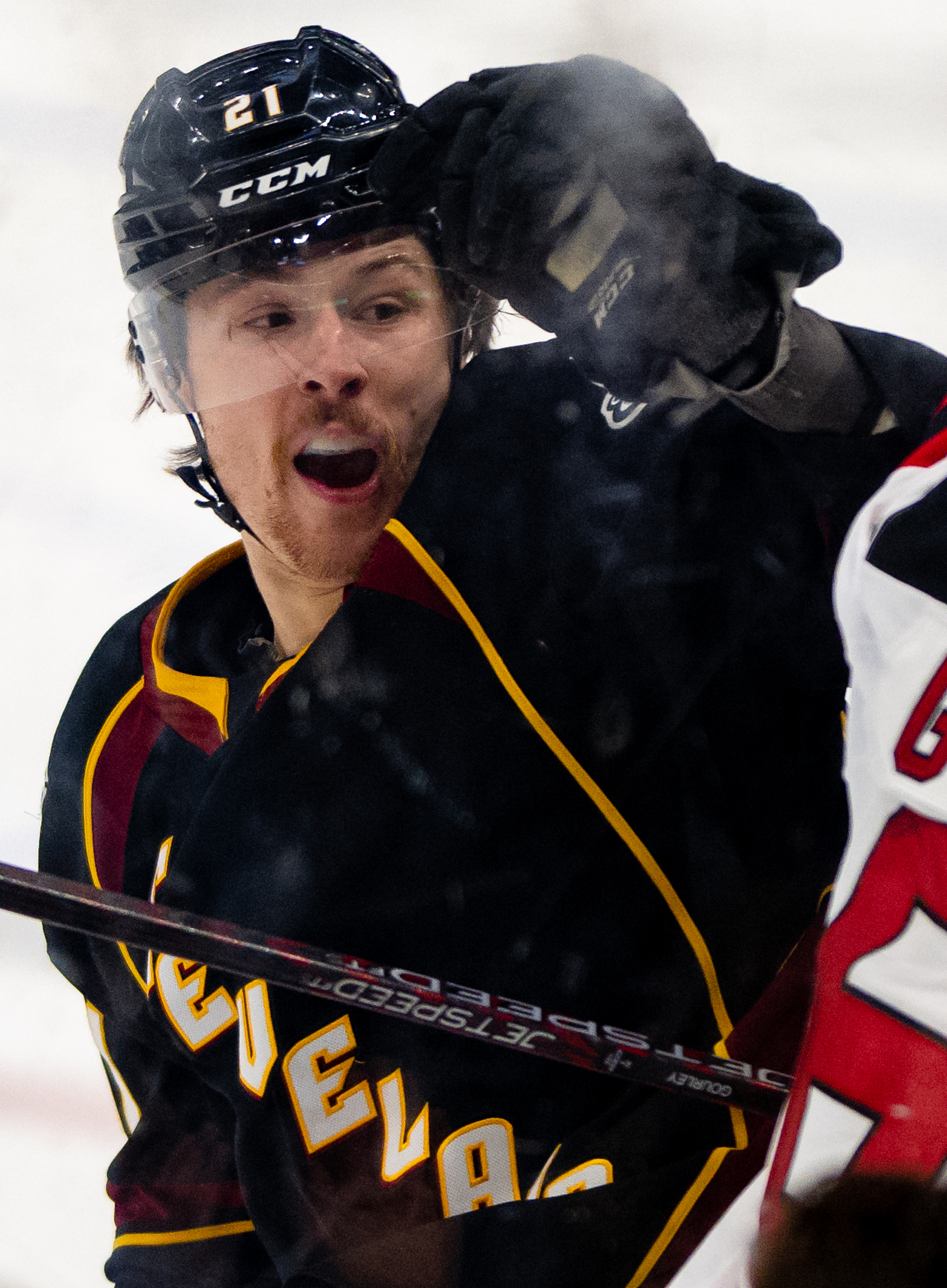
- Dunne with the Cleveland Monsters in 2023
- Born: December 8, 1998 (age 27) O'Fallon, Missouri, U.S.
- Height: 6 ft 4 in (193 cm)
- Weight: 210 lb (95 kg; 15 st 0 lb)
- Position: Forward
- Shoots: Left
- NHL team (P) Cur. team Former teams: Washington Capitals; Hershey Bears (AHL); Columbus Blue Jackets; Buffalo Sabres
- NHL draft: Undrafted
- Playing career: 2021–present

Josh Dunne (born December 8, 1998) is an American professional ice hockey forward for the Hershey Bears in the American Hockey League (AHL) while under contract to the Washington Capitals of the National Hockey League (NHL).

== Playing career ==
Dunne played collegiate hockey for the Clarkson Golden Knights in the NCAA. He signed as an undrafted free agent with the Columbus Blue Jackets on March 14, 2021.

In the 2020–21 season, Dunne joined the Blue Jackets' AHL affiliate, making his professional debut with the Cleveland Monsters. After 7 games with the Monsters, Dunne was recalled by Columbus and made his NHL debut in a 4–1 defeat against the Dallas Stars on April 15, 2021.

After four seasons with the Blue Jackets, Dunne left the club as a free agent and was signed to a two-year, two-way contract with the Buffalo Sabres on July 1, 2024.

At the conclusion of his contract with the Sabres, Dunne was signed to a one-year, $850,000 contract with the Washington Capitals for the 2026–27 season on July 1, 2026.

== Personal life ==
Dunne has five siblings all of whom have played college hockey at some level. He was the first in his family to play hockey, he began playing inline hockey at age five after he first started watching hockey. His elder sister Jincy, currently plays for the Minnesota Frost. His younger sister Joy currently plays for Ohio State, as did his older sister Jessica previously. His younger brother James plays ACHA level hockey at Oklahoma State and his younger sister Josey played two seasons at Lindenwood University after playing three years at University of Minnesota.

During the 2026 Winter Olympics in Milan-Cortina Josh attended to support both his younger sister Joy, on Team USA, as well as his girlfriend, Ella Shelton, who plays for Team Canada as well as the Toronto Sceptres in the PWHL. The two faced off against one another in the gold medal game. Josh and Ella became engaged in July 2026.

== Career statistics ==
			Regular season					Playoffs
Season	Team	League	GP	G	A	Pts	PIM	GP	G	A	Pts	PIM
2014–15	St. Louis AAA Blues	T1EHL	29	3	16	19	37	4	1	2	3	4
2014–15	Green Bay Gamblers	USHL	4	0	1	1	2	—	—	—	—	—
2015–16	Green Bay Gamblers	USHL	21	3	4	7	22	4	0	0	0	2
2016–17	Green Bay Gamblers	USHL	55	10	8	18	49	—	—	—	—	—
2017–18	Green Bay Gamblers	USHL	60	21	27	48	18	2	0	0	0	0
2018–19	Clarkson University	ECAC	32	14	9	23	14	—	—	—	—	—
2019–20	Clarkson University	ECAC	32	13	14	27	30	—	—	—	—	—
2020–21	Clarkson University	ECAC	14	2	3	5	26	—	—	—	—	—
2020–21	Cleveland Monsters	AHL	15	8	2	10	14	—	—	—	—	—
2020–21	Columbus Blue Jackets	NHL	6	0	0	0	4	—	—	—	—	—
2021–22	Cleveland Monsters	AHL	29	6	5	11	39	—	—	—	—	—
2022–23	Cleveland Monsters	AHL	65	20	17	37	71	—	—	—	—	—
2022–23	Columbus Blue Jackets	NHL	8	0	0	0	6	—	—	—	—	—
2023–24	Cleveland Monsters	AHL	25	2	5	7	24	14	7	4	11	8
2024–25	Rochester Americans	AHL	68	10	19	29	46	8	3	4	7	2
2024–25	Buffalo Sabres	NHL	2	0	0	0	5	—	—	—	—	—
2025–26	Buffalo Sabres	NHL	34	1	3	4	38	2	0	0	0	0
2025–26	Rochester Americans	AHL	2	1	0	1	4	—	—	—	—	—
NHL totals			50	1	3	4	53	2	0	0	0	0

== Awards and honors ==
Award	Year
College
ECAC Best Defensive Forward	2020
ECAC Third All-Star Team	2020
