= Chase Priskie =

American ice hockey player (born 1996)

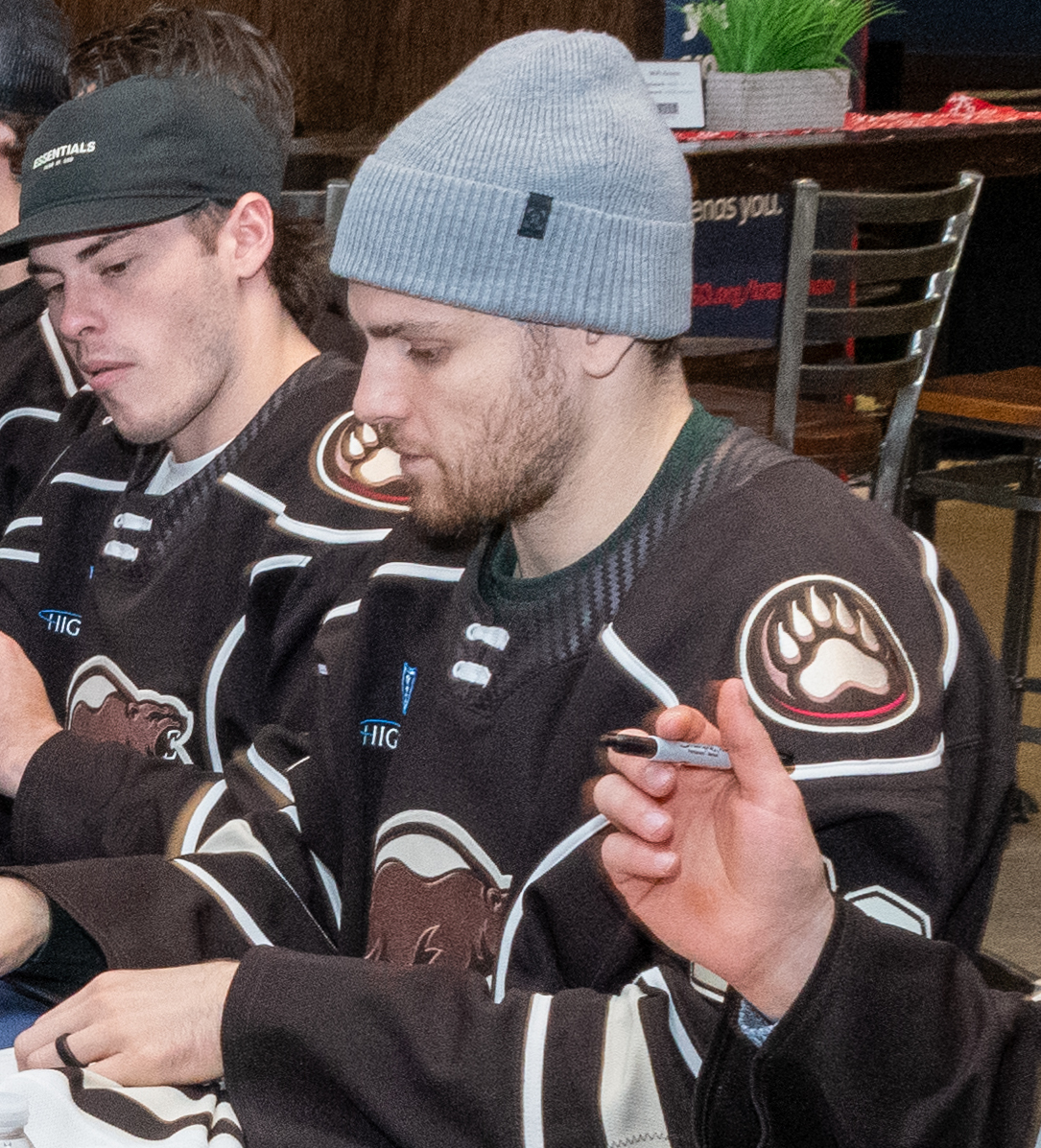
- Priskie with the Hershey Bears in 2023
- Born: March 19, 1996 (age 30) Pembroke Pines, Florida, U.S.
- Height: 6 ft 0 in (183 cm)
- Weight: 185 lb (84 kg; 13 st 3 lb)
- Position: Defense
- Shoots: Right
- KHL team Former teams: Barys Astana; Florida Panthers; Sibir Novosibirsk
- NHL draft: 177th overall, 2016; Washington Capitals
- Playing career: 2019–present

Chase Evans Priskie (born March 19, 1996) is an American professional ice hockey defenseman who is currently playing for Barys Astana in the Kontinental Hockey League (KHL).

Priskie appeared in four National Hockey League (NHL) contests with the Florida Panthers. He is the first player exclusively born and raised in South Florida to play a game for the Panthers.

== Playing career ==
Born in March 1996, Priskie was originally eligible to be drafted in the 2014 NHL entry draft, but was not chosen until two years later when he was selected near the end of the sixth round, 177th overall by the Washington Capitals, after playing at Quinnipiac University for the Bobcats. In his first season, Priskie averaged top four minutes and finished third in points among team defensemen; he was ranked 126th overall according to NHL Central Scouting heading into the draft. He would play three more seasons with Quinnipiac, finishing with over a point-per-game in his final season. During this time, he served as team captain from 2017 to 2019, when he graduated. In his final season, he was a finalist for the Hobey Baker Award and led all defensemen in the country in goals scored, but lost the prestigious award to Cale Makar.

After his final year of college, Priskie was not signed by the Capitals and became a free agent in August 2019. On August 17, Priskie and the Carolina Hurricanes agreed to terms on a two-year, entry-level contract. In his first professional season, Priskie did not make the Hurricanes' roster and was assigned to Carolina's minor league affiliate, the Charlotte Checkers. He appeared in 52 games with the Checkers, recording 31 points. On February 24, 2020, the NHL's trade deadline, Priskie was included in a package with Erik Haula, Eetu Luostarinen, and Lucas Wallmark when he was traded to the Florida Panthers in exchange for Vincent Trocheck. He played the rest of the season in the AHL with Florida's affiliate, the Springfield Thunderbirds.

During the COVID-19 affected 2020–21 season, the Panthers and Tampa Bay Lightning shared an AHL team, the Syracuse Crunch, where Priskie appeared in 15 games. As a restricted free agent, Priskie was re-signed by the Panthers to a $750,000 one-year, two-way contract on August 5, 2021. The following season, the Checkers became Florida's affiliate, and Priskie began the season with them. Priskie was called up to the Panthers three times by November 3, 2021, to serve as depth for Panthers defensive injuries, but did not appear in a game. He made his NHL debut the following night against the Capitals due to an injury to Radko Gudas, playing on the bottom defensive pair next to Kevin Connauton. He played 10:37 and recorded one shot on goal in a 5–4 overtime win. In his debut, Priskie became the first Florida player to suit up for the Panthers. His accomplishment was celebrated with several billboards in the Sunrise, Florida, area. Priskie was returned to the AHL on November 7.

A free agent at the end of the season, Priskie signed a one-year contract with the Buffalo Sabres on July 13, 2022, the opening day of free agency. On March 3, 2023, the Sabres traded Priskie to the Anaheim Ducks in exchange for Austin Strand.

On July 5, 2023, Priskie signed a one-year, two-way contract in joining his draft club, the Washington Capitals, for the 2023–24 season.

On June 28, 2025, at the 2025 NHL entry draft, Priskie was traded by the Capitals alongside a fourth-round draft pick to the Minnesota Wild, in exchange for Declan Chisholm and a sixth-round pick.

Not offered a contract with the Wild, Priskie as a free agent opted to pursue a career abroad, signing a one-year deal with Russian based, HC Sibir Novosibirsk of the KHL, on July 18, 2025.

== Personal life ==
Priskie was born in Pembroke Pines, the only child of parents Jeff Priskie and Lisa Evans, and is Jewish. He grew up a fan of the Florida Panthers. Priskie first attended a Panthers game when he was 27 days old on April 16, 1996. While at Quinnipac, he majored in finance with a minor in computer science, graduating early in 2018. He completed a Master of Business Administration in 2019, also from Quinnipac.

== Career statistics ==
			Regular season					Playoffs
Season	Team	League	GP	G	A	Pts	PIM	GP	G	A	Pts	PIM
2014–15	Salmon Arm Silverbacks	BCHL	57	6	14	20	18	—	—	—	—	—
2015–16	Quinnipiac University	ECAC	43	4	22	26	2	—	—	—	—	—
2016–17	Quinnipiac University	ECAC	38	7	19	26	16	—	—	—	—	—
2017–18	Quinnipiac University	ECAC	37	11	14	25	10	—	—	—	—	—
2018–19	Quinnipiac University	ECAC	36	17	22	39	23	—	—	—	—	—
2019–20	Charlotte Checkers	AHL	56	6	25	31	22	—	—	—	—	—
2019–20	Springfield Thunderbirds	AHL	5	2	2	4	2	—	—	—	—	—
2020–21	Syracuse Crunch	AHL	15	3	4	7	4	—	—	—	—	—
2021–22	Charlotte Checkers	AHL	54	8	23	31	26	7	0	1	1	0
2021–22	Florida Panthers	NHL	4	0	0	0	2	—	—	—	—	—
2022–23	Rochester Americans	AHL	42	4	5	9	10	—	—	—	—	—
2022–23	San Diego Gulls	AHL	16	7	6	13	10	—	—	—	—	—
2023–24	Hershey Bears	AHL	69	8	26	34	40	20	2	12	14	6
2024–25	Hershey Bears	AHL	61	12	23	35	26	8	2	3	5	4
2025–26	Sibir Novosibirsk	KHL	50	4	20	24	12	5	0	0	0	4
NHL totals			4	0	0	0	2	—	—	—	—	—

== Awards and honors ==
Award	Year
AHL
Calder Cup	2024
