= Garrett Roe =

American ice hockey player (born 1988)

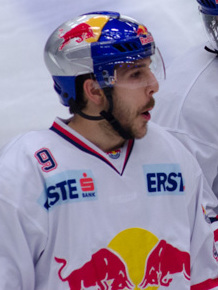
- Born: February 22, 1988 (age 38) Vienna, Virginia, U.S.
- Height: 5 ft 8 in (173 cm)
- Weight: 168 lb (76 kg; 12 st 0 lb)
- Position: Center / Left wing
- Shot: Left
- Played for: Adirondack Phantoms; EC Red Bull Salzburg; EHC München; Linköpings HC; EV Zug; ZSC Lions; Hershey Bears
- National team: United States
- NHL draft: 183rd overall, 2008; Los Angeles Kings
- Playing career: 2011–2025

Garrett Roe (born February 22, 1988) is an American former professional ice hockey left winger. He was selected 183rd overall by the Los Angeles Kings in the 2008 NHL entry draft.

== Playing career ==
Roe played for the Indiana Ice of the USHL before embarking on a four-year NCAA career at St. Cloud State University in 2007. He left St. Cloud as the school's all-time assist leader and third all-time in points scored. After graduating in 2011, he spent his first years of professional hockey in the AHL, playing for the Adirondack Phantoms.

Roe signed a deal with EC Salzburg of the Austrian elite league EBEL for the 2013-14 campaign.

He joined EHC München of the German DEL on a one-year contract on June 5, 2014, following head coach Don Jackson from fellow Red Bull sponsored EC Salzburg. In München, he recorded 13 goals and 38 assists in 51 games which ranked him ninth in the DEL in scoring.

Roe moved to Sweden for the 2015–16 season, signing with Linköpings HC of the country's top-tier competition SHL.

On April 27, 2017, Roe agreed to a two-year contract with EV Zug of the National League (NL). At the completion of a successful stint with Zug, Roe opted to continue in Switzerland agreeing to a two-year contract with rival club, ZSC Lions, on April 24, 2019. On February 17, 2021, the Lions signed Roe to an early two-year contract extension through to the end of the 2022–23 season.

Following four seasons with ZSC, Roe left the club at the conclusion of his contract. He was initially signed to a one-year contract to continue in Switzerland with the SCL Tigers of the NL, however mutually terminated his deal opting to return to North America on July 13, 2023.

In returning to the AHL for the first time in a decade, Roe was signed to a one-year contract with reigning Calder Cup champions, the Hershey Bears, on July 19, 2023.

Following his second year with the Bears in the 2024–25 season, Roe announced his retirement from professional hockey after 14 professional seasons.

== Career statistics ==
=== Regular season and playoffs ===
			Regular season					Playoffs
Season	Team	League	GP	G	A	Pts	PIM	GP	G	A	Pts	PIM
2004–05	Indiana Ice	USHL	49	6	15	21	62	3	0	3	3	4
2005–06	Indiana Ice	USHL	49	21	32	53	93	2	3	0	3	0
2006–07	Indiana Ice	USHL	57	24	39	63	143	6	3	10	13	8
2007–08	St. Cloud State Huskies	WCHA	39	18	27	45	55	—	—	—	—	—
2008–09	St. Cloud State Huskies	WCHA	38	17	31	48	72	—	—	—	—	—
2009–10	St. Cloud State Huskies	WCHA	41	20	29	49	65	—	—	—	—	—
2010–11	St. Cloud State Huskies	WCHA	38	10	26	36	48	—	—	—	—	—
2011–12	Adirondack Phantoms	AHL	72	8	32	40	44	—	—	—	—	—
2012–13	Adirondack Phantoms	AHL	57	12	14	26	41	—	—	—	—	—
2013–14	EC Red Bull Salzburg	EBEL	44	16	27	43	44	14	4	11	15	14
2014–15	EHC München	DEL	51	13	38	51	56	1	0	0	0	2
2015–16	Linköpings HC	SHL	41	14	27	41	28	5	0	2	2	4
2016–17	Linköpings HC	SHL	49	16	21	37	49	3	0	0	0	2
2017–18	EV Zug	NL	44	12	37	49	32	5	3	0	3	4
2018–19	EV Zug	NL	31	9	22	31	55	13	6	11	17	12
2019–20	ZSC Lions	NL	44	13	35	48	20	—	—	—	—	—
2020–21	ZSC Lions	NL	39	8	24	32	46	9	1	4	5	2
2021–22	ZSC Lions	NL	37	10	19	29	22	7	1	1	2	4
2022–23	ZSC Lions	NL	31	4	10	14	13	3	1	1	2	2
2023–24	Hershey Bears	AHL	48	7	14	21	22	12	6	4	10	2
2024–25	Hershey Bears	AHL	38	4	14	18	20	4	0	2	2	6
AHL totals			215	31	74	105	127	16	6	6	12	8
NL totals			226	56	147	203	188	37	12	17	29	24

=== International ===
Year	Team	Event	Result	GP	G	A	Pts	PIM
2018	United States	OG	7th	5	1	1	2	0
Senior totals				5	1	1	2	0

== Awards and honors ==
Award	Year
College
All-WCHA Rookie Team	2007–08
All-WCHA Second team	2007–08
All-WCHA Third Team	2008–09, 2009–10
AHL
Calder Cup	2024
