= Jet Greaves =

Canadian ice hockey player (born 2001)

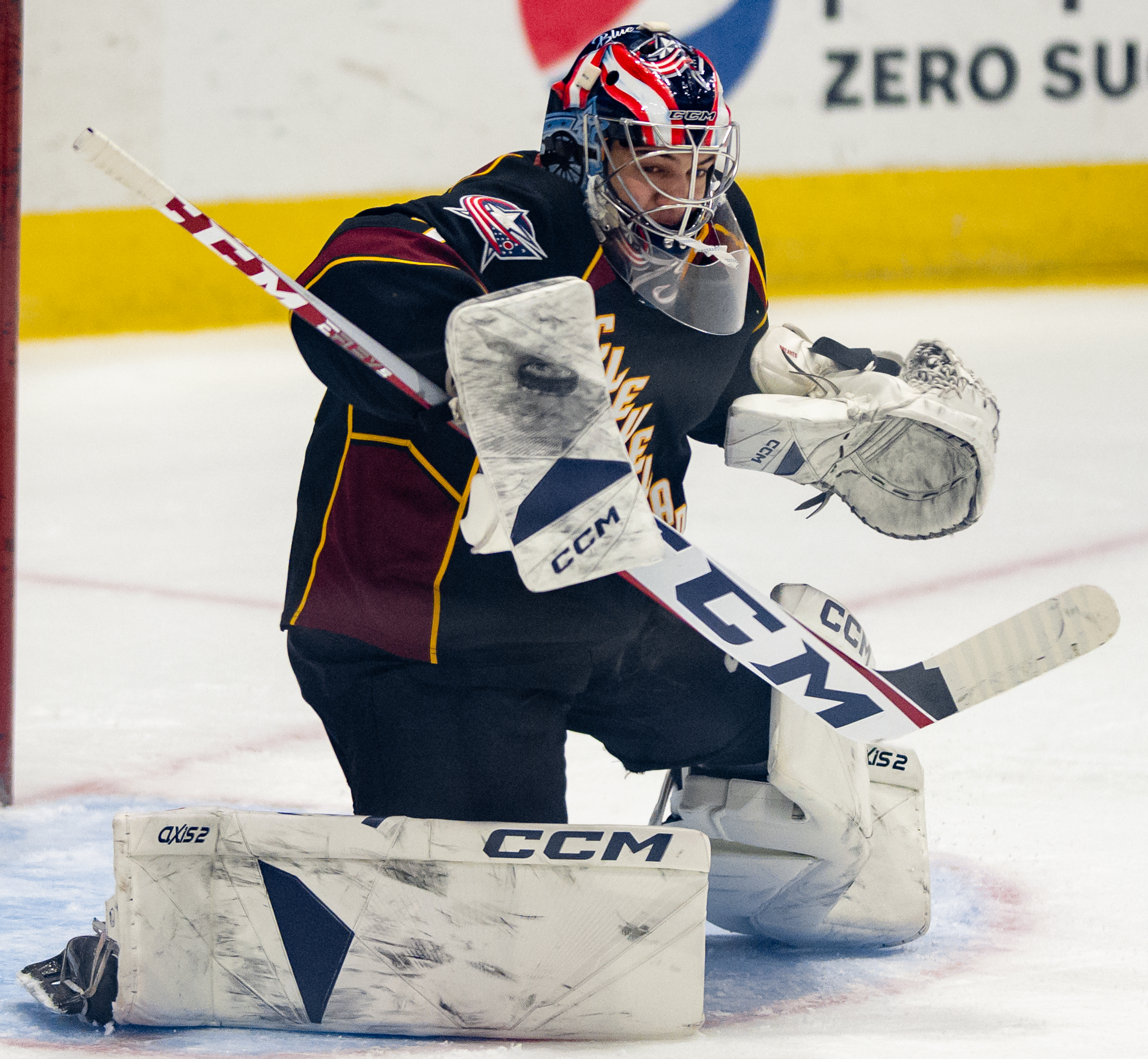
- Greaves with the Cleveland Monsters in 2023
- Born: March 30, 2001 (age 25) Cambridge, Ontario, Canada
- Height: 6 ft 0 in (183 cm)
- Weight: 179 lb (81 kg; 12 st 11 lb)
- Position: Goaltender
- Catches: Left
- NHL team: Columbus Blue Jackets
- National team: Canada
- NHL draft: Undrafted
- Playing career: 2022–present

Calvin Jet Greaves (pronounced /ˈɡrivz/; born March 30, 2001) is a Canadian professional ice hockey player who is a goaltender for the Columbus Blue Jackets of the National Hockey League (NHL).

Greaves made his NHL debut on April 4, 2023, in a game against the Toronto Maple Leafs, and set the record for most saves by a Columbus goaltender in their debut match.

== Playing career ==
Born and raised in Cambridge, Ontario, Greaves grew up playing for minor league teams in the Cambridge area. His play for the Cambridge Hawks led to Greaves being selected by the Barrie Colts in the third round, 56th overall in the 2017 Ontario Hockey League (OHL) draft. Greaves spent the season following his OHL draft selection with the Guelph Hurricanes of the Greater Ontario Junior Hockey League before joining the Colts for the 2018–19 OHL season. In his rookie season, Greaves was named to the OHL's First All-Rookie Team. Greaves spent two seasons with Barrie, splitting the net in relatively equal appearances with Kai Edmonds in his rookie season, and Artūrs Šilovs in his sophomore campaign (despite being expected to be the team's starter in his second year). The OHL cancelled its 2020–21 season amid the COVID-19 pandemic in Ontario; Greaves did not sign with an out-of-province or international team during this stoppage, and as a result, did not play in what would have been his third OHL season.

Greaves was never selected in a National Hockey League (NHL) draft, although he was first eligible to be drafted in 2019. Despite not playing competitive hockey in what would have been the 2020–21 season, Greaves was signed to a professional contract by the Cleveland Monsters of the American Hockey League, the top affiliate club of the Columbus Blue Jackets of the NHL. He made his professional debut on October 23, 2021, making 40 saves in a 2–1 win over the Belleville Senators. Greaves' first professional season was split between the Monsters and the Kalamazoo Wings of the ECHL. Although he was not the primary goalie in the Blue Jackets' prospects system, Greaves impressed the team with his play, and was signed to a three-year, entry-level contract by the club on February 20, 2022.

Entering his second professional season, Greaves was expected to serve as Cleveland's primary backup goaltender behind starter Daniil Tarasov. However, he ultimately played more games than Tarasov and cemented himself as the team's main goalie throughout the season. On January 11, 2023, Greaves was called up by the Blue Jackets on an emergency basis after Tarasov (now with Columbus) suffered an injury, although he ultimately did not appear in any games with the team during this stint. On April 2, as a reward for his play over the past two seasons, Greaves was told after serving backup for that evenings Monsters game that he would be called up, and was later told that he would make his NHL debut starting against his hometown Toronto Maple Leafs on April 4. In his debut, Greaves stopped 46 of 49 shots faced in a 4–2 loss to Toronto. Greaves' play was praised by fans and media after the match, and his 46 save performance was the fifth most in an NHL debut since 1955–56; in the process, he also set a team record for most saves recorded in a debut. Greaves recorded his first NHL shutout against the Washington Capitals on April 12, 2025. As a result of his efforts, Greaves was recognized as the NHL’s First Star of the Week on April 14.

Greaves ended the 2025-26 NHL season with a 2.60 goals-against average and a 0.908 save percentage. He signed a three-year contract with the Columbus Blue Jackets on July 23, 2026.

== International play ==
Greaves was named to Team Canada for the 2026 World Championship. Out of eight total games for Canada, he was the goaltender for six, one of which was a shutout. He had a 1.88 goals-against average and a .920 save percentage.

== Personal life ==
Greaves' younger brother, Kai, is also a hockey player. Their father became a goalie in his thirties. Growing up, Greaves was a fan of the Toronto Maple Leafs. He would often attend games and, as a teenager, was particularly fond of Leafs goaltender Frederik Andersen.

== Career statistics ==
=== Regular season and playoffs ===
			Regular season									Playoffs
Season	Team	League	GP	W	L	OTL	MIN	GA	SO	GAA	SV%	GP	W	L	MIN	GA	SO	GAA	SV%
2016–17	Cambridge Winter Hawks	GOJHL	2	0	2	0	118	3	0	1.53	.950	—	—	—	—	—	—	—	—
2017–18	Guelph Hurricanes	GOJHL	35	10	23	0	1,945	112	4	3.46	.899	3	0	2	88	12	0	8.14	.778
2018–19	Barrie Colts	OHL	27	7	12	3	1,411	79	1	3.36	.911	—	—	—	—	—	—	—	—
2019–20	Barrie Colts	OHL	33	23	15	2	1,773	118	2	3.99	.888	—	—	—	—	—	—	—	—
2021–22	Kalamazoo Wings	ECHL	15	10	5	0	847	43	0	3.05	.907	—	—	—	—	—	—	—	—
2021–22	Cleveland Monsters	AHL	29	12	12	3	1,586	75	1	2.84	.905	—	—	—	—	—	—	—	—
2022–23	Cleveland Monsters	AHL	43	19	16	5	2,419	124	2	3.08	.899	—	—	—	—	—	—	—	—
2022–23	Columbus Blue Jackets	NHL	1	0	1	0	59	3	0	3.05	.939	—	—	—	—	—	—	—	—
2023–24	Cleveland Monsters	AHL	46	30	12	4	2,684	131	1	2.93	.910	13	8	5	831	30	1	2.17	.926
2023–24	Columbus Blue Jackets	NHL	9	3	6	0	516	30	0	3.49	.908	—	—	—	—	—	—	—	—
2024–25	Cleveland Monsters	AHL	40	21	11	6	2,340	102	3	2.62	.920	6	3	3	404	18	0	2.67	.912
2024–25	Columbus Blue Jackets	NHL	11	7	2	2	660	21	2	1.91	.938	—	—	—	—	—	—	—	—
2025–26	Columbus Blue Jackets	NHL	55	26	19	9	3,276	142	2	2.60	.908	—	—	—	—	—	—	—	—
NHL totals			76	36	28	11	4,511	196	4	2.61	.913	—	—	—	—	—	—	—	—

=== International ===
Year	Team	Event	Result	GP	W	L	T	MIN	GA	SO	GAA	SV%
2026	Canada	WC	4th	8	6	2	0	478	15	1	1.88	.920
Senior totals				38	6	2	0	478	15	1	1.88	.920

== Awards and honors ==
Award	Year	Ref
OHL
OHL First All-Rookie Team	2019	
