= Marshall Rifai =

Canadian ice hockey player (born 1998)

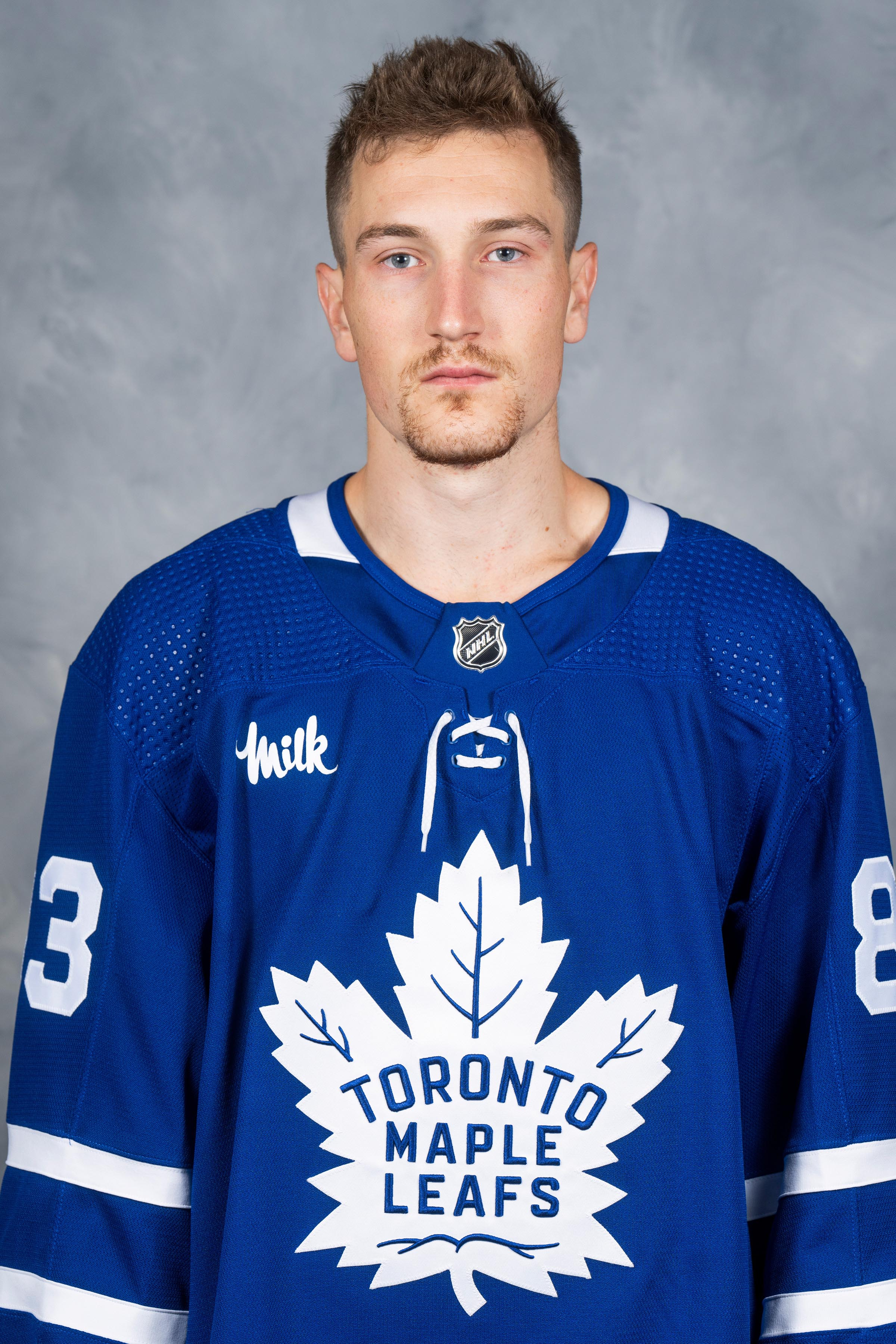
- Rifai in 2023
- Born: March 16, 1998 (age 28) Beaconsfield, Quebec, Canada
- Height: 6 ft 2 in (188 cm)
- Weight: 205 lb (93 kg; 14 st 9 lb)
- Position: Defence
- Shoots: Left
- NHL team: Toronto Maple Leafs
- NHL draft: Undrafted
- Playing career: 2022–present

Marshall Rifai (born March 16, 1998) is a Canadian professional ice hockey defenceman currently playing with the Toronto Maple Leafs of the National Hockey League (NHL). He is of Syrian descent.

== Playing career ==
Growing up in the Montreal area, Rifai played junior hockey in the Quebec youth systems. Although Rifai had hoped to enter the Quebec Major Junior Hockey League when he reached the 16-year old eligibility requirement, he recognized that he was unlikely to be drafted as an undersized 5-foot-7-inch (1.70 m) tall player, and instead opted to enroll in Hotchkiss School in Connecticut, where he continued to play hockey. Playing two years at Hotchkiss, Rafai experienced a growth spurt; in light of this, he went undrafted in his debut class of the National Hockey League (NHL)'s 2016 draft. He then played one season in the United States Hockey League, split across the Omaha Lancers and the Des Moines Buccaneers, before enrolling at Harvard University.

In his rookie season with the Harvard Crimson, Rifai only appeared in six games, going scoreless. He became a mainstay on the team in his sophomore season, appearing in 30 games with the club and winning the Donald Angier Hockey Trophy for the Crimson player showing the greatest improvement from their previous season. The COVID-19 pandemic forced the cancellation of winter athletics at Ivy League universities, including Harvard, but Rifai returned to the team in his final season, again a mainstay on the school's blueline as the team won the ECAC Championship. Upon graduation, Rifai was courted with NHL offers from several teams, but ultimately decided to sign a one-year contract with the Toronto Marlies of the American Hockey League (AHL), owing to the parent club Toronto Maple Leafs of the NHL detailed development plan they had prepared for his success.

In his debut professional season, Rifai appeared in 69 games with the Marlies, recording 16 points in the regular season before appearing in 5 playoff games with the team. At the conclusion of his season with the Marlies, the Maple Leafs signed Rifai to a two-year, entry-level NHL contract on July 1, 2023. He again began his sophomore season on the Marlies, playing with the team until February. On February 18, 2024, Rifai was recalled by the Maple Leafs on an emergency basis, after a suspension to Morgan Rielly and the absence of three other team defencemen in the preceding days (Mark Giordano from the recent death of his father, and Conor Timmins and William Lagesson to injury). He made his NHL debut the following afternoon, recording 11:33 of ice time and 1 shot on the bottom defence pairing in a 4–2 win over the St. Louis Blues. After appearing in one more game with the Maple Leafs, Rifai was returned to the Marlies.

On September 5, 2024, Rifai signed a two-year, $1.5 million contract extension with the Maple Leafs.

On October 20, 2026, Rifai scored his first NHL goal in a 6-2 victory against the Columbus Blue Jackets

== Career statistics ==
			Regular season					Playoffs
Season	Team	League	GP	G	A	Pts	PIM	GP	G	A	Pts	PIM
2014–15	Hotchkiss School	HS Prep	24	2	8	10	—	—	—	—	—	—
2015–16	Hotchkiss School	HS Prep	19	3	16	19	—	—	—	—	—	—
2016–17	Hotchkiss School	HS Prep	21	9	19	28	—	—	—	—	—	—
2017–18	Omaha Lancers	USHL	13	1	5	6	10	—	—	—	—	—
2017–18	Des Moines Buccaneers	USHL	37	4	14	18	48	—	—	—	—	—
2018–19	Harvard University	ECAC	6	0	0	0	2	—	—	—	—	—
2019–20	Harvard University	ECAC	30	1	7	8	20	—	—	—	—	—
2021–22	Harvard University	ECAC	35	5	8	13	20	—	—	—	—	—
2022–23	Toronto Marlies	AHL	69	4	12	16	118	5	0	1	1	4
2023–24	Toronto Marlies	AHL	57	2	17	19	71	3	3	1	4	2
2023–24	Toronto Maple Leafs	NHL	2	0	0	0	0	—	—	—	—	—
2024–25	Toronto Marlies	AHL	63	3	10	13	77	2	0	0	0	0
2025–26	Toronto Marlies	AHL	20	0	5	5	30	24	2	4	6	22
2025–26	Toronto Maple Leafs	NHL	1	0	0	0	0	—	—	—	—	—
NHL totals			3	0	0	0	0	—	—	—	—	—

== Awards and honours ==
Award	Year
AHL
Calder Cup champion	2026
