= Ivan Miroshnichenko (ice hockey) =

Russian ice hockey player (born 2004)

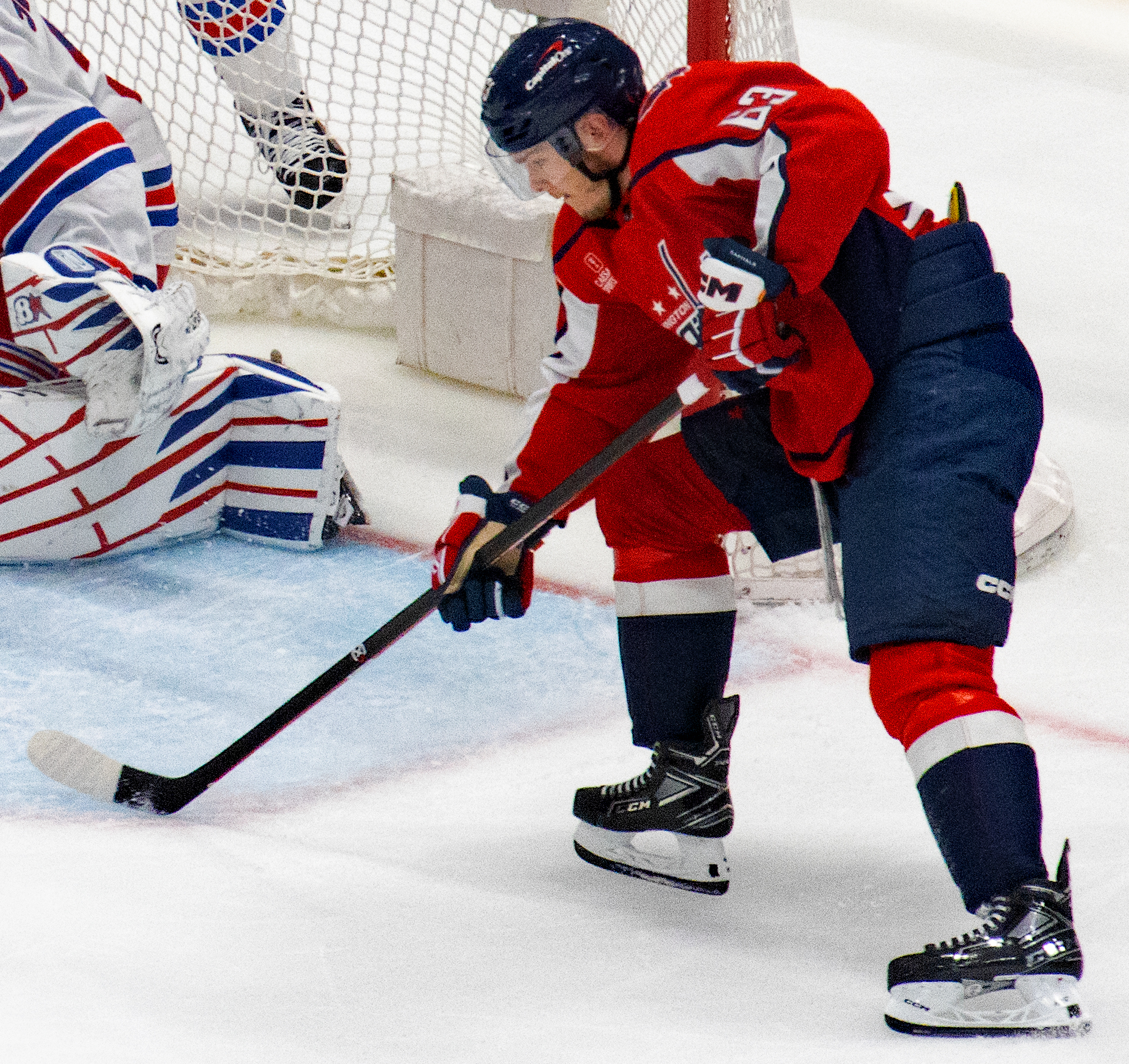
- Miroshnichenko with the Washington Capitals in 2024
- Born: February 4, 2004 (age 22) Ussuriysk, Russia
- Height: 6 ft 1 in (185 cm)
- Weight: 185 lb (84 kg; 13 st 3 lb)
- Position: Forward
- Shoots: Right
- NHL team Former teams: Washington Capitals; Avangard Omsk
- NHL draft: 20th overall, 2022; Washington Capitals
- Playing career: 2021–present

Ivan Nikolayevich Miroshnichenko (Russian: Иван Николаевич Мирошниченко; born 4 February 2004) is a Russian professional ice hockey forward who currently plays for the Washington Capitals of the National Hockey League (NHL). Miroshnichenko was drafted 20th overall by the Capitals in the 2022 NHL entry draft. On December 20, 2023, Miroshnichenko set a league record in his NHL debut as the longest surname on an NHL jersey at 14 characters long, surpassing Jamie Langenbrunner and John Vanbiesbrouck. Though this ties John Brackenborough for the longest surname for an NHL player, Brackenborough played before the league adopted surnames on jerseys.

== Playing career ==
Miroshnichenko played as a youth through the junior ranks within the HC Vityaz organization. On 27 December 2020, he moved from within Vityaz to fellow Kontinental Hockey League (KHL) club, Avangard Omsk.

During the 2021–22 season, while in the VHL with affiliate Omskie Krylia, on 28 February 2022, Miroshnichenko signed a contract extension with Avangard that would have kept him playing in Russia until 2024. In March 2022, Miroshnichenko was diagnosed with Hodgkin lymphoma, which prematurely ended his season in the VHL. After receiving treatment in Germany, the cancer went into full remission. Three months after his diagnosis, Miroshnichenko resumed skating in preparation for the next season.

On 1 May 2023, Miroshnichenko left the KHL and signed a three-year, entry-level contract with the Washington Capitals. On December 20, 2023, he made his NHL debut with the Capitals. He scored his first NHL goal on March 7, 2024. Miroshnichenko won the Calder Cup with Washington’s farm team, the Hershey Bears, on June 24, 2024.

== International play ==
Miroshnichenko scored six goals and eight points playing for Russia at the 2021 IIHF World U18 Championships, winning a silver medal. He was Russia's captain at the 2021 Hlinka Gretzky Cup, winning gold.

== Career statistics ==
=== Regular season and playoffs ===
			Regular season					Playoffs
Season	Team	League	GP	G	A	Pts	PIM	GP	G	A	Pts	PIM
2020–21	Omskie Yastreby	MHL	20	5	10	15	5	—	—	—	—	—
2021–22	Omskie Krylia	VHL	31	10	6	16	6	—	—	—	—	—
2021–22	Omskie Yastreby	MHL	1	0	0	0	2	—	—	—	—	—
2022–23	Avangard Omsk	KHL	23	3	1	4	0	—	—	—	—	—
2022–23	Omskie Krylia	VHL	4	0	3	3	2	—	—	—	—	—
2022–23	Omskie Yastreby	MHL	12	10	4	14	27	16	2	5	7	4
2023–24	Hershey Bears	AHL	47	9	16	25	13	20	7	5	12	6
2023–24	Washington Capitals	NHL	21	2	4	6	6	1	0	0	0	0
2024–25	Hershey Bears	AHL	53	23	19	42	28	8	3	2	5	10
2024–25	Washington Capitals	NHL	18	1	3	4	0	—	—	—	—	—
KHL totals			23	3	1	4	0	—	—	—	—	—
NHL totals			39	3	7	10	6	1	0	0	0	0

=== International ===
Year	Team	Event	Result	GP	G	A	Pts	PIM
2021	Russia	U18	2nd place, silver medalist(s)	7	6	2	8	4
2021	Russia	HG18	1st place, gold medalist(s)	5	4	5	9	0
Junior totals				12	10	7	17	4

== Awards and honours ==
Award	Year
AHL
Calder Cup	2024

Awards and achievements
Preceded by Hendrix Lapierre	Washington Capitals first-round draft pick 2022	Succeeded by Ryan Leonard
