= Ethen Frank =

American ice hockey player (born 1998)

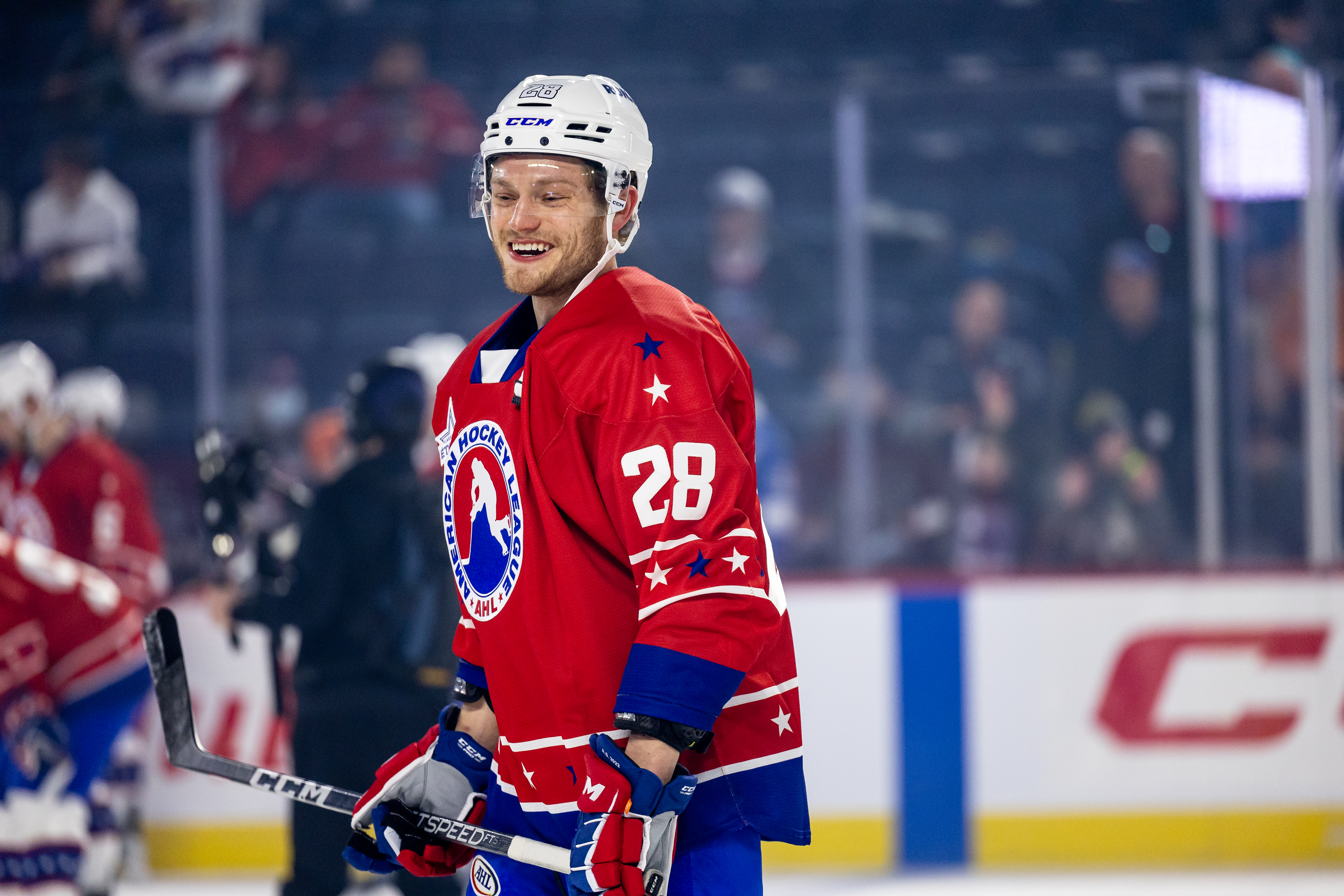
- Frank at the 2023 AHL All-Star Game
- Born: February 5, 1998 (age 28) Denver, Colorado, U.S.
- Height: 5 ft 10 in (178 cm)
- Weight: 178 lb (81 kg; 12 st 10 lb)
- Position: Forward
- Shoots: Right
- NHL team: Washington Capitals
- NHL draft: Undrafted
- Playing career: 2022–present

Ethen Frank (born February 5, 1998) is an American professional ice hockey player who is a forward for the Washington Capitals of the National Hockey League (NHL). He was an All-American for Western Michigan in 2022.

== Playing career ==
Frank spent several years playing junior hockey near his home town in the Omaha Lancers system. In his final year of 16-and-under play, he averaged more than two points per game in three separate leagues and made a brief appearance in the USHL. During his senior year in high school, Frank became a full-time member of the Lincoln Stars, playing against men who were 2- or 3-years older. He put up decent numbers that season but came into his own after graduating. He finished second on the team in both goals and points and ended his junior career by accepting a scholarship at Western Michigan.

Similar to what had occurred in the USHL, Frank took a while to get up to the speed of the NCAA game. He produced modest numbers as a freshman but rounded into form as a sophomore. Frank saw a bit of a regression during his junior season but both he and the Broncos suffered a terrible fate when the season was cut short due to the COVID-19 pandemic. In what was supposed to be his fourth and final season with the program, Frank had to wait nearly two months to play his first game. When he did, however, he began scoring at an increased pace and ended up leading the team with 13 goals in just 24 games. Unfortunately, the team did not fare well during the strange year and finished 6th in the conference standings.

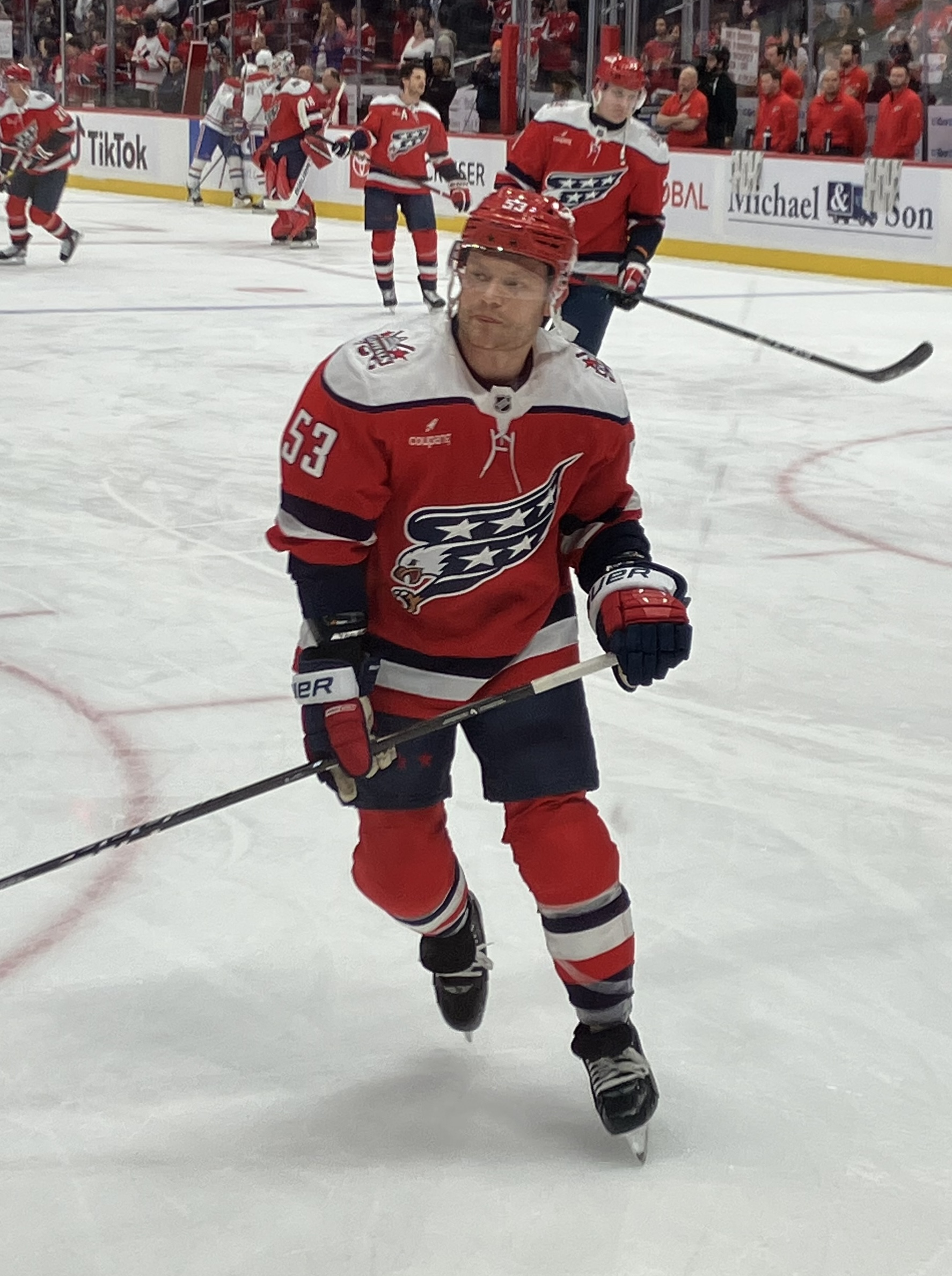
Frank with the Washington Capitals in 2026

Because the NCAA had already announced that it would not count the 2021 season towards the 4-year limit for player eligibility, Frank was able to return for a 5th season with Western Michigan. From the start of the season, everything seemed to align for WMU including the torrent of goals provided by Frank. He helped the Broncos put together an enviable record and ensure the team a spot in the NCAA tournament. He distinguished himself by leading the nation with 26 goals and was named an AHCA West Second Team All-American. Though the Broncos fell in the NCHC Championship game, reaching the conference final enabled Western Michigan to receive a #1 seed and a favorable draw in the regional semifinals. Frank's final collegiate point came on the game's opening goal which turned out to be vital for the Broncos as the game eventually went into overtime. Less than two minutes into the extra session, Frank was on the ice with the rest of the Broncos, celebrating the first NCAA tournament victory in program history. He was able to parlay his collegiate success into a professional contract and signed with the Hershey Bears.

Frank set a new record for the "Fastest Skater" event during the 2023 AHL All-Star Classic, achieving a time of 12.915, surpassing Connor McDavid's record of 13.310. His skates later went into the Hockey Hall of Fame.

After leading both the Bears and all AHL rookies in goals during the 2022–23 season, Frank was signed to a one-year, two-way contract by the Washington Capitals on March 2, 2023.

On July 1, 2024, Frank, a restricted free agent, signed a two-year contract with the Capitals, worth $1.55 million. The first year of this is a two-way contract, while the second year will be one-way.

On January 10, 2025, Frank made his NHL debut with the Capitals, tallying an assist in the 3–2 overtime loss against the Montreal Canadiens. The next day, on January 11, 2025, Frank scored his first NHL goal in the Capitals' 4–1 victory over the Nashville Predators, with his goal being the game winner.

On March 4, 2026, Frank signed a two-year, $4 million contract extension with the Capitals.

== Career statistics ==
			Regular season					Playoffs
Season	Team	League	GP	G	A	Pts	PIM	GP	G	A	Pts	PIM
2014–15	Lincoln Stars	USHL	3	0	2	2	2	—	—	—	—	—
2015–16	Lincoln Stars	USHL	48	10	9	19	4	1	0	0	0	0
2016–17	Lincoln Stars	USHL	55	18	23	41	77	—	—	—	—	—
2017–18	Western Michigan	NCHC	30	7	5	12	23	—	—	—	—	—
2018–19	Western Michigan	NCHC	34	15	11	26	29	—	—	—	—	—
2019–20	Western Michigan	NCHC	32	9	11	20	6	—	—	—	—	—
2020–21	Western Michigan	NCHC	24	13	8	21	4	—	—	—	—	—
2021–22	Western Michigan	NCHC	38	26	13	39	34	—	—	—	—	—
2021–22	Hershey Bears	AHL	5	1	0	1	0	—	—	—	—	—
2022–23	Hershey Bears	AHL	57	30	19	49	20	16	2	4	6	4
2023–24	Hershey Bears	AHL	64	29	18	47	14	18	10	7	17	2
2024–25	Hershey Bears	AHL	35	20	8	28	12	—	—	—	—	—
2024–25	Washington Capitals	NHL	24	4	3	7	6	—	—	—	—	—
2025–26	Hershey Bears	AHL	3	2	0	2	0	—	—	—	—	—
2025–26	Washington Capitals	NHL	62	12	12	24	18	—	—	—	—	—
NHL totals			86	16	15	31	24	—	—	—	—	—

== Awards and honors ==
Award	Year
College
All-NCHC First Team	2021–22
AHCA West Second Team All-American	2021–22
AHL
All-Rookie Team	2023
Calder Cup	2023, 2024
