= 2025 Calder Cup playoffs =

American Hockey League postseason tournament

Tournament details
- Dates: April 22 - June 23, 2025
- Teams: 23

Final positions
- Champions: Abbotsford Canucks
- Runners-up: Charlotte Checkers

Tournament statistics
- Scoring leader(s): Linus Karlsson (Canucks) (26 points)

Awards
- MVP: Arturs Silovs (Canucks)

The 2025 Calder Cup playoffs was the postseason tournament of the American Hockey League (AHL) to determine the winner of the Calder Cup, which is awarded to the AHL playoff champions from the 2024–25 AHL season.

All teams except the bottom two teams of the Atlantic, North, and Central divisions, as well as the bottom three teams of the Pacific division qualified for the playoffs. Each division has a best-of-three series in the first round to determine the top 16 teams for the division semifinals, with various teams receiving byes based on regular season performance.

The 16 teams that remain—four from each division—will play a best-of-five series in the division semifinals, with the playoffs continuing with another best-of-five series for the division finals and a best-of-seven series for the conference finals and Calder Cup finals.

In June 2025, the Abbotsford Canucks won their first Calder Cup after defeating the Charlotte Checkers in six games. It is the first time in history that an AHL affiliate of the Vancouver Canucks has won the Calder Cup finals.

== Playoff format ==
The AHL will continue to use the same playoff format used since 2022. The playoff field will include the top six finishers in the eight-team Atlantic Division, the top five finishers each in the seven-team North and Central Divisions, and the top seven teams in the 10-team Pacific Division. First-round match-ups will be best-of-three series; the two highest seeds in the Atlantic, the three highest seeds in each of the North and Central, and the first-place team in the Pacific will receive byes into the best-of-five Division Semifinals, with the first-round winners re-seeded in each division. The division finals will also be best-of-five series, followed by best-of-seven conference finals and a best-of-seven Calder Cup finals series.

== Playoff seeds ==
After the 2024–25 AHL regular season, 23 teams qualified for the playoffs. The Hershey Bears were the first team to clinch a playoff spot on March 16, while the Laval Rocket earned the regular season title on April 19.

=== Eastern Conference ===
==== Atlantic Division ====
1. Hershey Bears – 96 points (.667)
2. Charlotte Checkers – 94 points (.653)
3. Providence Bruins – 90 points (.625)
4. Wilkes-Barre/Scranton Penguins – 88 points (.611)
5. Lehigh Valley Phantoms – 80 points (.556)
6. Springfield Thunderbirds – 74 points (.514)

==== North Division ====
1. Laval Rocket, Macgregor Kilpatrick Trophy winners – 101 points (.701)
2. Rochester Americans – 92 points (.639)
3. Syracuse Crunch – 86 points (.597), 28 RWs
4. Toronto Marlies – 86 points (.597), 25 RWs
5. Cleveland Monsters – 81 points (.563)

=== Western Conference ===
==== Central Division ====
1. Milwaukee Admirals – 91 points (.632)
2. Texas Stars – 89 points (.618)
3. Grand Rapids Griffins – 80 points (.556)
4. Chicago Wolves – 78 points (.542)
5. Rockford IceHogs – 70 points (.486)

==== Pacific Division ====
1. Colorado Eagles – 94 points (.653)
2. Abbotsford Canucks – 92 points (.639)
3. Ontario Reign – 90 points (.625)
4. Coachella Valley Firebirds – 84 points (.583)
5. Calgary Wranglers – 81 points (.563), 31 RWs
6. San Jose Barracuda – 81 points (.563), 29 RWs
7. Tucson Roadrunners – 74 points (.514)

== Bracket ==
First Round; April 22–27
A3 | Providence | 2
A6 | Springfield | 1
A4 | Wilkes-Barre/Scranton | 0
A5 | Lehigh Valley | 2
N4 | Toronto | 0
N5 | Cleveland | 2
C4 | Chicago | 0
C5 | Rockford | 2
P2 | Abbotsford | 2
P7 | Tucson | 1
P3 | Ontario | 0
P6 | San Jose | 2
P4 | Coachella Valley | 2
P5 | Calgary | 0

Division Semifinals; April 25 – May 11
A1 | Hershey | 3
A5 | Lehigh Valley | 2
Atlantic Division
A2 | Charlotte | 3
A3 | Providence | 2
N1 | Laval | 3
N5 | Cleveland | 1
North Division
N2 | Rochester | 3
N3 | Syracuse | 0
C1 | Milwaukee | 3
C5 | Rockford | 2
Central Division
C2 | Texas | 3
C3 | Grand Rapids | 0
P1 | Colorado | 3
P6 | San Jose | 1
Pacific Division
P2 | Abbotsford | 3
P4 | Coachella Valley | 1

Division Finals; May 14–26
A1 | Hershey | 0
A2 | Charlotte | 3
Eastern Conference
N1 | Laval | 3
N2 | Rochester | 2
C1 | Milwaukee | 2
C2 | Texas | 3
Western Conference
P1 | Colorado | 2
P2 | Abbotsford | 3

Conference Finals; May 28 – June 8
A2 | Charlotte | 4
N1 | Laval | 0
C2 | Texas | 2
P2 | Abbotsford | 4

Calder Cup Finals; June 13–23
A2 | Charlotte | 2
P2 | Abbotsford | 4

== First round ==
=== Eastern Conference first round ===
==== (A3) Providence Bruins vs. (A6) Springfield Thunderbirds ====
| April 23 | Springfield Thunderbirds | 2–1 | Providence Bruins | Amica Mutual Pavilion | Recap |
| Zach Dean (1) – 6:32; Matt Luff (1) – 10:32 | | First period | No scoring |
| No scoring | | Second period | 3:44 – pp – Oliver Wahlstrom (1) |
| No scoring | | Third period | No scoring |
| Colten Ellis (39 saves / 40 shots) | | Goalie stats | Michael DiPietro (13 saves / 15 shots) |

| April 25 | Providence Bruins | 1–0 | OT | Springfield Thunderbirds | MassMutual Center | Recap |
| No scoring | | First period | | No scoring |
| No scoring | | Second period | | No scoring |
| No scoring | | Third period | | No scoring |
| Vinni Lettieri (1) – 1:14 | | First overtime period | | No scoring |
| Michael DiPietro (24 saves / 24 shots) | | Goalie stats | | Colten Ellis (24 saves / 25 shots) |

| April 27 | Springfield Thunderbirds | 1–5 | Providence Bruins | Amica Mutual Pavilion | Recap |
| Corey Schueneman (1) – 4:01 | | First period | No scoring |
| No scoring | | Second period | 2:38 – pp – Matt Poitras (1) |
| No scoring | | Third period | 7:41 – pp – Ian Mitchell (1); 8:35 – Riley Tufte (1); 15:07 – Riley Tufte (2); 15:39 – pp – Matt Poitras (2) |
| Colten Ellis (34 saves / 39 shots) | | Goalie stats | Michael DiPietro (15 saves / 16 shots) |

| Providence won series 2–1 |

==== (A4) Wilkes-Barre/Scranton Penguins vs. (A5) Lehigh Valley Phantoms ====
| April 23 | Lehigh Valley Phantoms | 5–2 | Wilkes-Barre/Scranton Penguins | Mohegan Sun Arena at Casey Plaza | Recap |
| Olle Lycksell (1) – 8:41 | | First period | No scoring |
| Alex Bump (1) – 8:25; Rodrigo Abols (1) – 13:46 | | Second period | No scoring |
| Alex Bump (2) – pp – 8:17; Anthony Richard (1) – 9:50 | | Third period | 15:08 – Avery Hayes (1); 18:51 – Gabe Klassen (1) |
| Parker Gahagen (28 saves / 30 shots) | | Goalie stats | Joel Blomqvist (23 saves / 26 shots); Taylor Gauthier (5 saves / 7 shots) |

| April 25 | Wilkes-Barre/Scranton Penguins | 2–3 | Lehigh Valley Phantoms | PPL Center | Recap |
| No scoring | | First period | No scoring |
| Tristan Broz (1) – pp – 19:35 | | Second period | 14:33 – Anthony Richard (2) |
| Harrison Brunicke (1) – 6:26 | | Third period | 7:54 – Jacob Gaucher (1); 18:00 – Helge Grans (1) |
| Sergei Murashov (28 saves / 31 shots) | | Goalie stats | Parker Gahagen (31 saves / 33 shots) |

| Lehigh Valley won series 2–0 |

==== (N4) Toronto Marlies vs. (N5) Cleveland Monsters ====
| April 24 | Toronto Marlies | 3–4 | OT | Cleveland Monsters | Rocket Arena | Recap |
| Alexander Nylander (1) – 6:30 | | First period | | 7:48 – Denton Mateychuk (1) |
| No scoring | | Second period | | No scoring |
| Alex Steeves (1) – pp – 16:49; Alex Steeves (2) – 19:11 | | Third period | | 4:11 – Guillaume Richard (1); 8:22 – pp – Luca Pinelli (1) |
| No scoring | | First overtime period | | 9:42 – Luca Pinelli (2) |
| Dennis Hildeby (31 saves / 35 shots) | | Goalie stats | | Jet Greaves (25 saves / 28 shots) |

| April 26 | Cleveland Monsters | 4–3 | 2OT | Toronto Marlies | Coca-Cola Coliseum | Recap |
| No scoring | | First period | | 14:35 – Zach Solow (1) |
| Hunter McKown (1) – 7:47; Rocco Grimaldi (1) – 14:58; Denton Mateychuk (2) – 17:16 | | Second period | | 4:03 – Zach Solow (2) |
| No scoring | | Third period | | 4:50 – ps – Robert Mastrosimone (1) |
| James Malatesta (1) – 19:05 | | Second overtime period | | No scoring |
| Jet Greaves (39 saves / 42 shots) | | Goalie stats | | Matt Murray (46 saves / 50 shots) |

| Cleveland won series 2–0 |

=== Western Conference first round ===
==== (C4) Chicago Wolves vs. (C5) Rockford IceHogs ====
| April 23 | Rockford IceHogs | 2–1 | OT | Chicago Wolves | Allstate Arena | Recap |
| No scoring | | First period | | No scoring |
| Kevin Korchinski (1) – 17:22 | | Second period | | 6:53 – pp – Juha Jaaska (1) |
| No scoring | | Third period | | No scoring |
| Artyom Levshunov (1) – pp – 11:00 | | First overtime period | | No scoring |
| Drew Commesso (32 saves / 33 shots) | | Goalie stats | | Spencer Martin (34 saves / 36 shots) |

| April 25 | Chicago Wolves | 0–5 | Rockford IceHogs | BMO Center | Recap |
| No scoring | | First period | 1:56 – Joey Anderson (1); 5:44 – Kevin Korchinski (2) |
| No scoring | | Second period | 3:55 – Gerry Mayhew (1) |
| No scoring | | Third period | 6:37 – Gerry Mayhew (2); 17:35 – en – Aku Raty (1) |
| Spencer Martin (20 saves / 24 shots) | | Goalie stats | Drew Commesso (34 saves / 34 shots) |

| Rockford won series 2–0 |

==== (P2) Abbotsford Canucks vs. (P7) Tucson Roadrunners ====
| April 23 | Tucson Roadrunners | 3–4 | Abbotsford Canucks | Abbotsford Centre | Recap |
| Hunter Drew (1) – 18:22 | | First period | 9:45 – Tristen Nielsen (1) |
| Travis Barron (1) – sh – 18:05 | | Second period | 3:42 – pp – Sammy Blais (1); 14:36 – Linus Karlsson (1); 16:49 – pp – Sammy Blais (2) |
| Artem Duda (1) – 7:29 | | Third period | No scoring |
| Matt Villalta (19 saves / 23 shots) | | Goalie stats | Arturs Silovs (21 saves / 24 shots) |

| April 24 | Tucson Roadrunners | 4–1 | Abbotsford Canucks | Abbotsford Centre | Recap |
| Ben McCartney (1) – 12:30 | | First period | No scoring |
| Andrew Agozzino (1) – 3:58; Kailer Yamamoto (1) – 19:41 | | Second period | No scoring |
| Ben McCartney (2) – en – 18:19 | | Third period | 2:54 – Linus Karlsson (2) |
| Jaxson Stauber (38 saves / 39 shots) | | Goalie stats | Arturs Silovs (28 saves / 31 shots) |

| April 26 | Tucson Roadrunners | 0–5 | Abbotsford Canucks | Abbotsford Centre | Recap |
| No scoring | | First period | 16:14 – Tristen Nielsen (2) |
| No scoring | | Second period | 00:46 – sh – Chase Wouters (1); 6:20 – pp – Max Sasson (1) |
| No scoring | | Third period | 11:16 – pp – Sammy Blais (3); 17:09 – en – Phillip Di Giuseppe (1) |
| Jaxson Stauber (34 saves / 38 shots) | | Goalie stats | Arturs Silovs (21 saves / 21 shots) |

| Abbotsford won series 2–1 |

==== (P3) Ontario Reign vs. (P6) San Jose Barracuda ====
| April 24 | San Jose Barracuda | 2–0 | Ontario Reign | Crypto.com Arena | Recap |
| No scoring | | First period | No scoring |
| No scoring | | Second period | No scoring |
| Pavol Regenda (1) – 7:20; Filip Bystedt (1) – pp – 8:39 | | Third period | No scoring |
| Yaroslav Askarov (17 saves / 17 shots) | | Goalie stats | Pheonix Copley (23 saves / 25 shots) |

| April 26 | San Jose Barracuda | 2–1 | Ontario Reign | Crypto.com Arena | Recap |
| No scoring | | First period | No scoring |
| Anthony Vincent (1) – 7:40 | | Second period | No scoring |
| Collin Graf (1) – 17:42 | | Third period | 6:12 – Martin Chromiak (1) |
| Yaroslav Askarov (29 saves / 30 shots) | | Goalie stats | Pheonix Copley (23 saves / 25 shots) |

| San Jose won series 2–0 |

==== (P4) Coachella Valley Firebirds vs. (P5) Calgary Wranglers ====
| April 22 | Calgary Wranglers | 3–4 | 3OT | Coachella Valley Firebirds | Acrisure Arena | Recap |
| No scoring | | First period | | 3:39 – John Hayden (1); 7:37 – Brandon Biro (1) |
| No scoring | | Second period | | 14:05 – Mitchell Stephens (1) |
| Dryden Hunt (1) – 6:51; Lucas Ciona (1) – 14:53; Rory Kerins (1) – 19:53 | | Third period | | No scoring |
| No scoring | | Third overtime period | | 2:00 – Mitchell Stephens (2) |
| Waltteri Ignatjew (46 saves / 50 shots) | | Goalie stats | | Niklas Kokko (36 saves / 39 shots) |

| April 26 | Calgary Wranglers | 0–2 | Coachella Valley Firebirds | Acrisure Arena | Recap |
| No scoring | | First period | No scoring |
| No scoring | | Second period | 15:22 – Mitchell Stephens (3) |
| No scoring | | Third period | 19:43 – en – John Hayden (2) |
| Waltteri Ignatjew (18 saves / 19 shots) | | Goalie stats | Niklas Kokko (23 saves / 23 shots) |

| Coachella Valley won series 2–0 |

== Division semifinals ==
=== Eastern Conference division semifinals ===
==== (A1) Hershey Bears vs. (A5) Lehigh Valley Phantoms ====
| April 30 | Lehigh Valley Phantoms | 0–3 | Hershey Bears | Giant Center | Recap |
| No scoring | | First period | 9:16 – Chase Priskie (1) |
| No scoring | | Second period | No scoring |
| No scoring | | Third period | 7:00 – Spencer Smallman (1); 18:49 – en – Bogdan Trineyev (1) |
| Parker Gahagen (24 saves / 26 shots) | | Goalie stats | Hunter Shepard (26 saves / 26 shots) |

| May 2 | Lehigh Valley Phantoms | 3–1 | Hershey Bears | Giant Center | Recap |
| No scoring | | First period | No scoring |
| Anthony Richard (3) – 18:41 | | Second period | No scoring |
| Zayde Wisdom (1) – sh – 2:05; Zayde Wisdom (2) – sh – 6:34 | | Third period | 2:50 – pp – Alex Limoges (1) |
| Parker Gahagen (19 saves / 20 shots) | | Goalie stats | Hunter Shepard (12 saves / 15 shots) |

| May 4 | Hershey Bears | 2–4 | Lehigh Valley Phantoms | PPL Center | Recap |
| No scoring | | First period | 11:23 – sh – Jacob Gaucher (2) |
| Andrew Perrott (1) – 3:03; Ivan Miroshnichenko (1) – 4:27 | | Second period | 13:09 – pp – Garrett Wilson (1); 15:51 – Nikita Grebenkin (1) |
| No scoring | | Third period | 14:09 – Olle Lycksell (2) |
| Hunter Shepard (22 saves / 26 shots) | | Goalie stats | Parker Gahagen (15 saves / 17 shots); Cal Petersen (15 saves / 15 shots) |

| May 9 | Hershey Bears | 6–4 | Lehigh Valley Phantoms | PPL Center | Recap |
| Bogdan Trineyev (2) – 5:46; Chase Priskie (2) – 11:51; Mike Vecchione (1) – 14:15 | | First period | No scoring |
| Pierrick Dube (1) – pp – 13:18; Pierrick Dube (2) – 16:32 | | Second period | 3:56 – Zayde Wisdom (3); 4:31 – Rodrigo Abols (2) |
| Ivan Miroschnichenko (2) – pp – 10:00 | | Third period | 13:47 – Oscar Eklind (1); 15:34 – Jacob Gaucher (3) |
| Clay Stevenson (28 saves / 32 shots) | | Goalie stats | Cal Petersen (21 saves / 27 shots) |

| May 11 | Lehigh Valley Phantoms | 2–4 | Hershey Bears | Giant Center | Recap |
| No scoring | | First period | 5:19 – Spencer Smallman (2); 16:13 – Riley Sutter (1) |
| No scoring | | Second period | 13:09 – Riley Sutter (2) |
| Anthony Richard (4) – pp – 2:08; Hunter McDonald (1) – 14:03 | | Third period | 18:20 – en – Bogdan Trineyev (3) |
| Cal Petersen (18 saves / 21 shots) | | Goalie stats | Hunter Shepard (19 saves / 21 shots) |

| Hershey won series 3–2 |

==== (A2) Charlotte Checkers vs. (A3) Providence Bruins ====
| May 2 | Charlotte Checkers | 5–1 | Providence Bruins | Amica Mutual Pavilion | Recap |
| John Leonard (1) – sh – 3:45; Justin Sourdif (1) – sh – 4:22 | | First period | 8:17 – Oliver Wahlstrom (2) |
| Michael Benning (1) – 5:44 | | Second period | No scoring |
| Ben Steeves (1) – 1:23; C. J. Smith (1) – en – 17:48 | | Third period | No scoring |
| Kaapo Kahkonen (27 saves / 28 shots) | | Goalie stats | Michael DiPietro (24 saves / 28 shots) |

| May 4 | Charlotte Checkers | 2–0 | Providence Bruins | Amica Mutual Pavilion | Recap |
| No scoring | | First period | No scoring |
| Wilmer Skoog (1) – 2:10; Ben Steeves (2) – 8:46 | | Second period | No scoring |
| No scoring | | Third period | No scoring |
| Kaapo Kahkonen (32 saves / 32 shots) | | Goalie stats | Michael DiPietro (27 saves / 29 shots) |

| May 7 | Providence Bruins | 3–2 | Charlotte Checkers | Bojangles Coliseum | Recap |
| Riley Tufte (3) – pp – 12:54 | | First period | 8:14 – Will Lockwood (1); 15:04 – pp – Rasmus Asplund (1) |
| Riley Tufte (4) – 7:42 | | Second period | No scoring |
| Tyler Pitlick (1) – 4:44 | | Third period | No scoring |
| Michael DiPietro (38 saves / 40 shots) | | Goalie stats | Kaapo Kahkonen (16 saves / 19 shots) |

| May 9 | Providence Bruins | 3–2 | OT | Charlotte Checkers | Bojangles Coliseum | Recap |
| No scoring | | First period | | 16:55 – Wilmer Skoog (2) |
| John Farinacci (1) – 9:26 | | Second period | | No scoring |
| Oliver Wahlstrom (3) – 14:51 | | Third period | | 1:16 – Ben Steeves (3) |
| Patrick Brown (1) – 7:08 | | First overtime period | | No scoring |
| Michael DiPietro (0 saves / 0 shots); Brandon Bussi (31 saves / 33 shots) | | Goalie stats | | Kaapo Kahkonen (31 saves / 34 shots) |

| May 11 | Providence Bruins | 2–5 | Charlotte Checkers | Bojangles Coliseum | Recap |
| No scoring | | First period | 7:18 – Tobias Bjornfot (1) |
| No scoring | | Second period | 8:38 – Wilmer Skoog (3) |
| Vinni Lettieri (2) – 7:58; Vinni Lettieri (3) – pp – 15:59 | | Third period | 3:18 – Oliver Okuliar (1); 18:52 – en – Tobias Bjornfot (2); 19:37 – en – Will Lockwood (2) |
| Brandon Bussi (25 saves / 28 shots) | | Goalie stats | Kaapo Kahkonen (6 saves / 8 shots) |

| Charlotte won series 3–2 |

==== (N1) Laval Rocket vs. (N5) Cleveland Monsters ====
| April 30 | Laval Rocket | 3–2 | Cleveland Monsters | Rocket Arena | Recap |
| No scoring | | First period | No scoring |
| Sean Farrell (1) – 16:09; Sean Farrell (2) – pp – 19:24 | | Second period | 12:07 – pp – Joseph LaBate (1) |
| Owen Beck (1) – 5:11 | | Third period | 17:36 – pp – Denton Mateychuk (3) |
| Jacob Fowler (23 saves / 25 shots) | | Goalie stats | Jet Greaves (29 saves / 32 shots) |

| May 2 | Laval Rocket | 4–0 | Cleveland Monsters | Rocket Arena | Recap |
| Jared Davidson (1) – 2:22 | | First period | No scoring |
| Lucas Condotta (1) – 3:12 | | Second period | No scoring |
| Alex Barre-Boulet (1) – 7:16; Gustav Lindstrom (1) – 14:32 | | Third period | No scoring |
| Jacob Fowler (20 saves / 20 shots) | | Goalie stats | Jet Greaves (25 saves / 29 shots) |

| May 4 | Cleveland Monsters | 3–1 | Laval Rocket | Place Bell | Recap |
| No scoring | | First period | No scoring |
| Dylan Gambrell (1) – 18:05 | | Second period | No scoring |
| Dylan Gambrell (2) – 7:32; Roman Ahcan (1) – sh – 11:49 | | Third period | 13:26 – Laurent Dauphin (1) |
| Jet Greaves (36 saves / 37 shots) | | Goalie stats | Cayden Primeau (22 saves / 25 shots) |

| May 6 | Cleveland Monsters | 1–4 | Laval Rocket | Place Bell | Recap |
| No scoring | | First period | 4:22 – Xavier Simoneau (1); 9:24 – pp – Laurent Dauphin (2); 12:31 – pp – Logan Mailloux (1) |
| Luca Del Bel Belluz – 17:19 | | Second period | No scoring |
| No scoring | | Third period | 17:27 – pp – Laurent Dauphin (3) |
| Jet Greaves (32 saves / 36 shots) | | Goalie stats | Jacob Fowler (18 saves / 19 shots) |

| Laval won series 3–1 |

==== (N2) Rochester Americans vs. (N3) Syracuse Crunch ====
| April 25 | Syracuse Crunch | 2–3 | Rochester Americans | Blue Cross Arena | Recap |
| No scoring | | First period | No scoring |
| Conor Sheary (1) – 0:21; Dylan Duke (1) – 3:29 | | Second period | 4:26 – Brendan Warren (1); 7:14 – pp – Riley Fiddler-Schultz (1) |
| No scoring | | Third period | 3:55 – Kale Clague (1) |
| Brandon Halverson (27 saves / 30 shots) | | Goalie stats | Devon Levi (25 saves / 27 shots) |

| April 27 | Syracuse Crunch | 0–4 | Rochester Americans | Blue Cross Arena | Recap |
| No scoring | | First period | 10:37 – Konsta Helenius (1) |
| No scoring | | Second period | 19:46 – pp – Jiri Kulich (1) |
| No scoring | | Third period | 5:53 – Kale Clague (2); 15:10 – en – Isak Rosen (1) |
| Brandon Halverson (18 saves / 21 shots) | | Goalie stats | Devon Levi (35 saves / 35 shots) |

| May 1 | Rochester Americans | 4–0 | Syracuse Crunch | Upstate Medical University Arena | Recap |
| Mason Jobst (1) – 15:51 | | First period | No scoring |
| No scoring | | Second period | No scoring |
| Kale Clague (3) – 1:45; Mason Jobst (2) – 7:45; Brendan Warren (2) – en - 18:42 | | Third period | No scoring |
| Devon Levi (30 saves / 30 shots) | | Goalie stats | Brandon Halverson (23 saves / 26 shots) |

| Rochester won series 3–0 |

=== Western Conference division semifinals ===
==== (C1) Milwaukee Admirals vs. (C5) Rockford IceHogs ====
| May 1 | Rockford IceHogs | 3–2 | OT | Milwaukee Admirals | UW–Milwaukee Panther Arena | Recap |
| No scoring | | First period | | No scoring |
| No scoring | | Second period | | 0:30 – Cal O'Reilly (1); 0:45 – Fedor Svechkov (1) |
| Paul Ludwinski (1) – 11:48; Gerry Mayhew (3) – 16:33 | | Third period | | No scoring |
| Colton Dach (1) – 0:12 | | First overtime period | | No scoring |
| Drew Commesso (28 saves / 30 shots) | | Goalie stats | | Matt Murray (25 saves / 28 shots) |

| May 3 | Rockford IceHogs | 6–1 | Milwaukee Admirals | UW–Milwaukee Panther Arena | Recap |
| Joey Anderson (2) – 1:09; Joey Anderson (3) – 19:04 | | First period | No scoring |
| Joey Anderson (4) – pp – 1:02; Samuel Savoie (1) – 16:50 | | Second period | 14:22 – Marc Del Gaizo (1) |
| Brett Seney (1) – en – 16:03; Aidan Thompson (1) – 16:58 | | Third period | No scoring |
| Drew Commesso (30 saves / 31 shots) | | Goalie stats | Matt Murray (13 saves / 18 shots) |

| May 7 | Milwaukee Admirals | 6–2 | Rockford IceHogs | BMO Center | Recap |
| Grigori Denisenko (1) – pp – 10:02; Kieffer Bellows (1) – 15:20; Spencer Stastney (1) – 18:32 | | First period | No scoring |
| Kieffer Bellows (2) – 1:18; Joakim Kemell (1) – 14:25 | | Second period | 19:40 – sh – Zach Sanford (1) |
| Kieffer Bellows (3) – 17:31 | | Third period | 1:55 – Samuel Savoie (2) |
| Matt Murray (25 saves / 27 shots) | | Goalie stats | Drew Commesso (22 saves / 27 shots); Mitchell Weeks (6 saves / 7 shots) |

| May 9 | Milwaukee Admirals | 3–2 | Rockford IceHogs | BMO Center | Recap |
| Turner Ottenbreit (1) – 7:54 | | First period | 8:02 – Jackson Cates (1); 18:45 – Aidan Thompson (2) |
| Kyle Marino (1) – 7:50; Ozzy Wiesblatt (1) – pp – 14:27 | | Second period | No scoring |
| No scoring | | Third period | No scoring |
| Matt Murray (23 saves / 25 shots) | | Goalie stats | Drew Commesso (23 saves / 26 shots) |

| May 11 | Rockford IceHogs | 3–4 | OT | Milwaukee Admirals | UW–Milwaukee Panther Arena | Recap |
| No scoring | | First period | | 5:23 – Chase De Leo (1) |
| Zach Sanford (2) – 4:25; Zach Sanford (3) – pp – 7:12 | | Second period | | 12:06 – Fedor Svechkov (2); 18:54 – Jesse Ylonen (1) |
| Joey Anderson (5) – 11:09 | | Third period | | No scoring |
| No scoring | | First overtime period | | 1:38 – pp – Fedor Svechkov (3) |
| Drew Commesso (30 saves / 34 shots) | | Goalie stats | | Matt Murray (28 saves / 31 shots) |

| Milwaukee won series 3–2 |

==== (C2) Texas Stars vs. (C3) Grand Rapids Griffins ====
| April 29 | Texas Stars | 4–0 | Grand Rapids Griffins | Van Andel Arena | Recap |
| Kyle Capobianco (1) – 3:40; Curtis McKenzie (1) – 6:45 | | First period | No scoring |
| Kole Lind (1) – pp – 5:30; Mathias Emilio Pettersen (1) – 8:57 | | Second period | No scoring |
| No scoring | | Third period | No scoring |
| Remi Poirier (29 saves / 29 shots) | | Goalie stats | Sebastian Cossa (15 saves / 19 shots); Jack Campbell (11 saves / 11 shots) |

| May 5 | Texas Stars | 4–2 | Grand Rapids Griffins | Van Andel Arena | Recap |
| Luke Krys (1) – 3:49; Arttu Hyry (1) – 9:08 | | First period | No scoring |
| Justin Hryckowian (1) – pp – 1:35; Curtis McKenzie (2) – 12:13 | | Second period | 15:52 – pp – Sheldon Dries (1) |
| No scoring | | Third period | 5:20 – Michael Brandsegg-Nygard (1) |
| Remi Poirier (17 saves / 19 shots) | | Goalie stats | Jack Campbell (27 saves / 31 shots) |

| May 9 | Grand Rapids Griffins | 4–5 | 2OT | Texas Stars | H-E-B Center at Cedar Park | Recap |
| Michael Brandsegg-Nygard (2) – 11:44 | | First period | | 3:36 – Kole Lind (2) |
| Nate Danielson (1) – 0:48; Dominik Shine (1) – 11:47; Amadeus Lombardi (1) – 16:24 | | Second period | | No scoring |
| No scoring | | Third period | | 3:52 – Matej Blumel (1); 12:03 – pp – Cameron Hughes (1); 14:15 – Trey Taylor (1) |
| No scoring | | Second overtime period | | 10:46 – Cameron Hughes (2) |
| Sebastian Cossa (44 saves / 49 shots) | | Goalie stats | | Remi Poirier (18 saves / 22 shots); Magnus Hellberg (18 saves / 18 shots) |

| Texas won series 3–0 |

==== (P1) Colorado Eagles vs. (P6) San Jose Barracuda ====
| May 2 | Colorado Eagles | 6–3 | San Jose Barracuda | Tech CU Arena | Recap |
| Calle Rosen (1) – 16:16 | | First period | No scoring |
| Chris Wagner (1) – pp – 3:02; Jayson Megna (1) – pp – 7:19; John Ludvig (1) – 17:55 | | Second period | 8:25 – sh – Filip Bystedt (2) |
| Jayson Megna (2) – en – 18:29; Tye Felhaber (1) – en – 19:30 | | Third period | 13:16 – Collin Graf (2); 17:41 – Colin White (1) |
| Trent Miner (25 saves / 28 shots) | | Goalie stats | Yaroslav Askarov (18 saves / 22 shots) |

| May 4 | Colorado Eagles | 1–2 | OT | San Jose Barracuda | Tech CU Arena | Recap |
| No scoring | | First period | | No scoring |
| Calle Rosen (2) – pp – 13:13 | | Second period | | 18:12 – sh – Pavol Regenda (2) |
| No scoring | | Third period | | No scoring |
| No scoring | | First overtime period | | 0:27 – pp – Danil Gushchin (1) |
| Trent Miner (34 saves / 36 shots) | | Goalie stats | | Yaroslav Askarov (27 saves / 28 shots) |

| May 6 | San Jose Barracuda | 2–3 | OT | Colorado Eagles | Blue Arena | Recap |
| No scoring | | First period | | 1:59 – Tye Felhaber (2); 17:02 – Jayson Megna (3) |
| Filip Bystedt (3) – pp – 13:05 | | Second period | | No scoring |
| Pavol Regenda (3) – 18:25 | | Third period | | No scoring |
| No scoring | | First overtime period | | 5:02 – Matthew Phillips (1) |
| Yaroslav Askarov (25 saves / 27 shots); Gabriel Carriere (2 saves / 3 shots) | | Goalie stats | | Trent Miner (29 saves / 31 shots) |

| May 7 | San Jose Barracuda | 1–3 | Colorado Eagles | Blue Arena | Recap |
| No scoring | | First period | No scoring |
| No scoring | | Second period | No scoring |
| Igor Chernyshov (1) – 4:09 | | Third period | 5:26 – Chase Bradley (1); 13:32 – pp – Tye Felhaber (3); 19:04 – en – Jason Polin (1) |
| Yaroslav Askarov (29 saves / 31 shots) | | Goalie stats | Trent Miner (35 saves / 36 shots) |

| Colorado won series 3–1 |

==== (P2) Abbotsford Canucks vs. (P4) Coachella Valley Firebirds ====
| May 1 | Abbotsford Canucks | 3–1 | Coachella Valley Firebirds | Acrisure Arena | Recap |
| Jett Woo (1) – 9:26; Danila Klimovich (1) – 10:31; Guillaume Brisebois (1) – 16:45 | | First period | 1:36 – Ryan Winterton (1) |
| No scoring | | Second period | No scoring |
| No scoring | | Third period | No scoring |
| Arturs Silovs (29 saves / 30 shots) | | Goalie stats | Niklas Kokko (25 saves / 28 shots) |

| May 3 | Abbotsford Canucks | 4–5 | OT | Coachella Valley Firebirds | Acrisure Arena | Recap |
| No scoring | | First period | | 3:02 – Gustav Olofsson (1); 7:20 – Ty Nelson (1); 19:22 – Maxime Lajoie (1) |
| Phillip Di Giuseppe (2) – 2:55; Nathan Smith (1) – 4:17 | | Second period | | No scoring |
| Jujhar Khaira (1) – 6:17; Jujhar Khaira (2) – 13:18 | | Third period | | 15:58 – Ben Meyers (1) |
| No scoring | | First overtime period | | 4:45 – Jacob Melanson (1) |
| Arturs Silovs (5 saves / 8 shots); Nikita Tolopilo (21 saves / 23 shots) | | Goalie stats | | Niklas Kokko (26 saves / 30 shots) |

| May 7 | Coachella Valley Firebirds | 1–3 | Abbotsford Canucks | Abbotsford Centre | Recap |
| No scoring | | First period | 15:05 – Nathan Smith (2); 19:37 – Kirill Kudryavtsev (1) |
| No scoring | | Second period | No scoring |
| Ryan Winterton (2) – 3:24 | | Third period | 19:00 – en – Phillip Di Giuseppe (3) |
| Niklas Kokko (20 saves / 22 shots) | | Goalie stats | Arturs Silovs (25 saves / 26 shots) |

| May 9 | Coachella Valley Firebirds | 0–2 | Abbotsford Canucks | Abbotsford Centre | Recap |
| No scoring | | First period | 09:53 – pp – Max Sasson (2) |
| No scoring | | Second period | No scoring |
| No scoring | | Third period | 18:29 – en – Linus Karlsson (3) |
| Niklas Kokko (22 saves / 23 shots) | | Goalie stats | Arturs Silovs (29 saves / 29 shots) |

| Abbotsford won series 3–1 |

== Division finals ==
=== Eastern Conference division finals ===
==== (A1) Hershey Bears vs. (A2) Charlotte Checkers ====
| May 16 | Hershey Bears | 2–3 | Charlotte Checkers | Bojangles Coliseum | Recap |
| No scoring | | First period | 8:23 – Sandis Vilmanis (1) |
| Bogdan Trineyev (4) – 6:40; Mike Vecchione (2) – 13:06 | | Second period | 15:50 – pp – Michael Benning (2) |
| No scoring | | Third period | 11:58 – sh – John Leonard (2) |
| Hunter Shepard (21 saves / 24 shots) | | Goalie stats | Kaapo Kahkoner (17 saves / 19 shots) |

| May 17 | Hershey Bears | 1–2 | OT | Charlotte Checkers | Bojangles Coliseum | Recap |
| Luke Philp (1) – 2:33 | | First period | | No scoring |
| No scoring | | Second period | | No scoring |
| No scoring | | Third period | | 4:16 – Rasmus Asplund (2) |
| No scoring | | First overtime period | | 3:09 – Rasmus Asplund (3) |
| Hunter Shepard (27 saves / 29 shots) | | Goalie stats | | Kaapo Kahkonen (17 saves / 18 shots) |

| May 21 | Charlotte Checkers | 6–3 | Hershey Bears | Giant Center | Recap |
| No scoring | | First period | 19:02 – Bogdan Trineyev (5) |
| Brett Chorske (1) – 3:50; Michael Benning (3) – 6:42; John Leonard (3) – 11:14 | | Second period | 2:05 – Mike Vecchione (3) |
| Will Lockwood (3) – 2:27; Kyle Criscuolo (1) – 4:53; Rasmus Asplund (4) – en – 18:20 | | Third period | 5:54 – Ivan Miroshnichenko (3) |
| Kaapo Kahkonen (23 saves / 26 shots) | | Goalie stats | Hunter Shepard (32 saves / 37 shots) |

| Charlotte won series 3–0 |

==== (N1) Laval Rocket vs. (N2) Rochester Americans ====
| May 14 | Laval Rocket | 5–4 | Rochester Americans | Blue Cross Arena | Recap |
| Logan Mailloux (2) – pp – 10:04; David Reinbacher (1) – 18:19 | | First period | 4:33 – pp – Kale Clague (4) |
| Brandon Gignac (1) – pp – 14:26; Alex Barre-Boulet (2) – 19:18 | | Second period | 2:23 – Konsta Helenius (2); 6:48 – Josh Dunne (1) |
| Oliver Kapanen (1) – 15:22 | | Third period | 11:18 – Isak Rosen (2) |
| Cayden Primeau (23 saves / 27 shots) | | Goalie stats | Devon Levi (29 saves / 34 shots) |

| May 16 | Laval Rocket | 3–5 | Rochester Americans | Blue Cross Arena | Recap |
| Laurent Dauphin (4) – 13:49 | | First period | 5:58 – pp – Kale Clague (5); 14:23 – Isak Rosen (3) |
| Lucas Condotta (2) – 4:41; Jared Davidson (2) – 13:14 | | Second period | 19:20 – Lukas Rousek (1) |
| No scoring | | Third period | 12:07 – pp – Jiri Kulich (2); 19:51 – en – Isak Rosén (4) |
| Jacob Fowler (31 saves / 35 shots) | | Goalie stats | Devon Levi (16 saves / 19 shots) |

| May 21 | Rochester Americans | 1–4 | Laval Rocket | Place Bell | Recap |
| No scoring | | First period | 0:15 – Luke Tuch (1) |
| No scoring | | Second period | No scoring |
| Lukas Rousek (2) – 2:46 | | Third period | 4:57 – Florian Xhekaj (1); 6:02 – Laurent Dauphin (5); 10:11 – Joshua Roy (1) |
| Devon Levi (16 saves / 20 shots) | | Goalie stats | Cayden Primeau (32 saves / 33 shots) |

| May 23 | Rochester Americans | 5–1 | Laval Rocket | Place Bell | Recap |
| Josh Dunne (2) – pp – 8:51; Tyson Kozak (1) – 15:07 | | First period | No scoring |
| Isak Rosen (5) – pp – 0:43; Josh Dunne (3) – 9:22 | | Second period | 7:45 – Joshua Roy (2) |
| Konsta Helenius (3) – sh – 13:59 | | Third period | No scoring |
| Devon Levi (22 saves / 23 shots) | | Goalie stats | Jacob Fowler (10 saves / 14 shots); Cayden Primeau (6 saves / 7 shots) |

| May 25 | Rochester Americans | 0–5 | Laval Rocket | Place Bell | Recap |
| No scoring | | First period | 10:51 – pp – Alex Barre-Boulet (3); 14:30 – Sean Farrell (3) |
| No scoring | | Second period | 0:24 – Lucas Condotta (3); 18:50 – pp – Joshua Roy (3) |
| No scoring | | Third period | 9:05 – Oliver Kapanen (2) |
| Devon Levi (29 saves / 34 shots) | | Goalie stats | Cayden Primeau (27 saves / 27 shots) |

| Laval won series 3–2 |

=== Western Conference division finals ===
==== (C1) Milwaukee Admirals vs. (C2) Texas Stars ====
| May 15 | Milwaukee Admirals | 2–4 | Texas Stars | H-E-B Center at Cedar Park | Recap |
| Cal O'Reilly (2) – pp – 8:16 | | First period | 3:10 – Matthew Seminoff (1); 19:56 – Justin Hryckowian (2) |
| No scoring | | Second period | 4:07 – pp – Justin Hryckowian (3) |
| Mark Friedman (1) – 9:47 | | Third period | 5:14 – Matej Blumel (2) |
| Matt Murray (24 saves / 28 shots) | | Goalie stats | Magnus Hellberg (23 saves / 25 shots) |

| May 18 | Milwaukee Admirals | 6–4 | Texas Stars | H-E-B Center at Cedar Park | Recap |
| Jesse Ylonen (2) – 18:30 | | First period | No scoring |
| Joakim Kemell (2) – 14:38 | | Second period | 5:33 – pp – Kole Lind (3); 7:55 – Justin Hryckowian (4) |
| Chase De Leo (2) – 3:33; Jesse Ylonen (3) – 5:24; Jake Lucchini (1) – 12:08; Ozzy Wiesblatt (2) – 13:12 | | Third period | 13:30 – Kole Lind (4); 14:46 – Kole Lind (5) |
| Matt Murray (16 saves / 20 shots) | | Goalie stats | Magnus Hellberg (23 saves / 29 shots) |

| May 21 | Texas Stars | 6–1 | Milwaukee Admirals | UW–Milwaukee Panther Arena | Recap |
| Kole Lind (1) – 3:45 | | First period | No scoring |
| Curtis McKenzie (3) – 13:18 | | Second period | No scoring |
| Kyle Capobianco (2) – 7:15; Jack Becker (1) – 7:50; Cameron Hughes (3) – 9:32; Justin Hryckowian (5) – pp – 17:53 | | Third period | 6:04 – Spencer Stastney (2) |
| Remi Poirier (30 saves / 31 shots) | | Goalie stats | Matt Murray (28 saves / 33 shots); Magnus Chrona (1 save / 2 shots) |

| May 23 | Texas Stars | 1–2 | OT | Milwaukee Admirals | UW–Milwaukee Panther Arena | Recap |
| Justin Hryckowian (6) – 0:29 | | First period | | No scoring |
| No scoring | | Second period | | No scoring |
| No scoring | | Third period | | 13:54 – Joakim Kemell (3) |
| No scoring | | First overtime period | | 12:11 – Ryder Rolston (1) |
| Remi Poirier (22 saves / 24 shots) | | Goalie stats | | Matt Murray (22 saves / 23 shots) |

| May 25 | Texas Stars | 3–2 | Milwaukee Admirals | UW–Milwaukee Panther Arena | Recap |
| Curtis McKenzie (4) – 5:33 | | First period | 9:55 – pp – Chase De Leo (3) |
| No scoring | | Second period | 12:05 – Fedor Svechkov (4) |
| Matej Blumel (3) – 1:44; Justin Hryckowian (7) – 14:55 | | Third period | No scoring |
| Remi Poirier (22 saves / 24 shots) | | Goalie stats | Matt Murray (27 saves / 30 shots) |

| Texas won series 3–2 |

==== (P1) Colorado Eagles vs. (P2) Abbotsford Canucks ====
| May 16 | Colorado Eagles | 0–2 | Abbotsford Canucks | Abbotsford Centre | Recap |
| No scoring | | First period | No scoring |
| No scoring | | Second period | 15:25 – pp – Ty Mueller (1) |
| No scoring | | Third period | 19:23 – Victor Mancini (1) |
| Trent Miner (22 saves / 23 shots) | | Goalie stats | Arturs Silovs (22 saves / 22 shots) |

| May 18 | Colorado Eagles | 5–3 | Abbotsford Canucks | Abbotsford Centre | Recap |
| Jake Wise (1) – 1:57 | | First period | 15:53 – Jonathan Lekkerimaki (1) |
| Wyatt Aamodt (1) – 13:30; Chris Wagner (2) – 18:06 | | Second period | No scoring |
| Ivan Ivan (1) – 5:23; Jayson Megna (4) – en – 16:56 | | Third period | 12:23 – Chase Wouters (2); 18:51 – pp – Linus Karlsson (4) |
| Trent Miner (27 saves / 30 shots) | | Goalie stats | Arturs Silovs (16 saves / 20 shots) |

| May 21 | Abbotsford Canucks | 3–2 | OT | Colorado Eagles | Blue Arena | Recap |
| Victor Mancini (2) – 10:27 | | First period | | 4:22 – John Ludvig (2) |
| No scoring | | Second period | | 19:00 – Jake Wise (2) |
| Max Sasson (3) – 10:45 | | Third period | | No scoring |
| Linus Karlsson (5) – 18:47 | | First overtime period | | No scoring |
| Arturs Silovs (35 saves / 37 shots) | | Goalie stats | | Trent Miner (30 saves / 33 shots) |

| May 23 | Abbotsford Canucks | 1–3 | Colorado Eagles | Blue Arena | Recap |
| No scoring | | First period | 3:36 – Jean-Luc Foudy (1) |
| No scoring | | Second period | 11:14 – Jayson Megna (5); 19:25 – pp – Tye Felhaber (4) |
| Nathan Smith (3) – 14:04 | | Third period | No scoring |
| Arturs Silovs (27 saves / 30 shots) | | Goalie stats | Trent Miner (24 saves / 25 shots) |

| May 26 | Abbotsford Canucks | 5–0 | Colorado Eagles | Blue Arena | Recap |
| Linus Karlsson (6) – pp – 17:46; Phillip Di Giuseppe (4) – 18:46 | | First period | No scoring |
| Cole McWard (1) – 9:09 | | Second period | No scoring |
| Linus Karlsson (7) – 0:34; Phillip Di Giuseppe (5) – en – 15:53 | | Third period | No scoring |
| Arturs Silovs (28 saves / 28 shots) | | Goalie stats | Trent Miner (17 saves / 21 shots) |

| Abbotsford won series 3–2 |

== Conference finals ==
=== Eastern Conference final ===
==== (N1) Laval Rocket vs. (A2) Charlotte Checkers ====
| May 28 | Charlotte Checkers | 5–1 | Laval Rocket | Place Bell | Recap |
| Sandis Vilmanis (2) – 1:44; Justin Sourdif (2) – 9:45 | | First period | No scoring |
| Oliver Okuliar (2) – 1:55 | | Second period | 5:47 – Oliver Kapanen (3) |
| John Leonard (4) – sh – 0:31; Jesse Puljujarvi (1) – en – 16:50 | | Third period | No scoring |
| Kaapo Kahkonen (30 saves / 31 shots) | | Goalie stats | Cayden Primeau (15 saves / 19 shots) |

| May 29 | Charlotte Checkers | 5–2 | Laval Rocket | Place Bell | Recap |
| Trevor Carrick (1) – pp – 17:32 | | First period | No scoring |
| John Leonard (5) – sh – 5:11; Michael Benning (4) – 14:21; Will Lockwood (4) – 15:05 | | Second period | No scoring |
| Riley Bezeau (1) – 12:05 | | Third period | 6:00 – Noel Hoefenmayer (1); 19:00 – pp – David Reinbacher (2) |
| Kaapo Kahkonen (23 saves / 25 shots) | | Goalie stats | Cayden Primeau (14 saves / 18 shots); Jacob Fowler (11 saves / 12 shots) |

| June 1 | Laval Rocket | 1–5 | Charlotte Checkers | Bojangles Coliseum | Recap |
| No scoring | | First period | 9:16 – Riley Bezeau (2) |
| Jared Davidson (3) – pp – 8:49 | | Second period | 0:53 – John Leonard (6); 2:01 – Riley Bezeau (3); 5:14 – Will Lockwood (5); 15:49 – Sandis Vilmanis (3) |
| No scoring | | Third period | No scoring |
| Cayden Primeau (12 saves / 16 shots); Jacob Fowler (12 saves / 13 shots) | | Goalie stats | Kaapo Kahkonen (22 saves / 23 shots) |

| June 3 | Laval Rocket | 2–3 | Charlotte Checkers | Bojangles Coliseum | Recap |
| Joshua Roy (4) – 19:14 | | First period | No scoring |
| Owen Beck (2) – 2:58 | | Second period | 4:38 – Justin Sourdif (3); 9:13 – sh – MacKenzie Entwistle (1) |
| No scoring | | Third period | 17:56 – Jesse Puljujarvi (2) |
| Jacob Fowler (23 saves / 26 shots) | | Goalie stats | Kaapo Kahkonen (23 saves / 25 shots) |

| Charlotte won series 4–0 |

=== Western Conference final ===
==== (P2) Abbotsford Canucks vs. (C2) Texas Stars ====
| May 29 | Texas Stars | 2–3 | OT | Abbotsford Canucks | Abbotsford Centre | Recap |
| Kole Lind (7) – 8:59 | | First period | | 18:56 – Guillaume Brisebois (2) |
| Antonio Stranges (1) – 12:10 | | Second period | | 6:32 – Ty Mueller (2) |
| No scoring | | Third period | | No scoring |
| No scoring | | First overtime period | | 5:51 – Christian Wolanin (1) |
| Remi Poirier (43 saves / 46 shots) | | Goalie stats | | Arturs Silovs (36 saves / 38 shots) |

| May 31 | Texas Stars | 0–1 | Abbotsford Canucks | Abbotsford Centre | Recap |
| No scoring | | First period | No scoring |
| No scoring | | Second period | No scoring |
| No scoring | | Third period | 7:39 – Akito Hirose (1) |
| Remi Poirier (28 saves / 29 shots) | | Goalie stats | Arturs Silovs (26 saves / 26 shots) |

| June 2 | Abbotsford Canucks | 2–5 | Texas Stars | H-E-B Center at Cedar Park | Recap |
| Christian Wolanin (2) – pp – 7:41; Linus Karlsson (8) – pp – 19:38 | | First period | 9:53 – pp – Kole Lind (8); 17:07 – pp – Matej Blumel (4); 18:39 – sh – Matej Blumel (5) |
| No scoring | | Second period | 11:00 – Antonio Stranges (2) |
| No scoring | | Third period | 5:25 – sh – Michael Karow (1) |
| Arturs Silovs (31 saves / 36 shots) | | Goalie stats | Remi Poirier (22 saves / 24 shots) |

| June 4 | Abbotsford Canucks | 5–4 | 2OT | Texas Stars | H-E-B Center at Cedar Park | Recap |
| Linus Karlsson (9) – 8:56; Tristen Nielsen (3) – 15:33 | | First period | | 4:18 – pp – Matej Blumel (6) |
| Victor Mancini (3) – 14:57; Tristen Nielsen (4) – 16:55 | | Second period | | 7:51 – Jack Becker (2); 9:28 – Cameron Hughes (4) |
| No scoring | | Third period | | 19:41 – Justin Hryckowian (8) |
| Danila Klimovich (2) – 3:21 | | Second overtime period | | No scoring |
| Arturs Silovs (27 saves / 31 shots) | | Goalie stats | | Remi Poirier (7 saves / 11 shots); Magnus Hellberg (22 saves / 23 shots) |

| June 6 | Abbotsford Canucks | 1–2 | OT | Texas Stars | H-E-B Center at Cedar Park | Recap |
| No scoring | | First period | | 3:56 – pp – Justin Hryckowian (9) |
| No scoring | | Second period | | No scoring |
| Arshdeep Bains (1) – pp – 2:42 | | Third period | | No scoring |
| No scoring | | First overtime period | | 2:09 – Curtis McKenzie (5) |
| Arturs Silovs (23 saves / 25 shots) | | Goalie stats | | Magnus Hellberg (30 saves / 31 shots) |

| June 8 | Texas Stars | 2–4 | Abbotsford Canucks | Abbotsford Centre | Recap |
| Matej Blumel (7) – 18:35 | | First period | No scoring |
| Harrison Scott (1) – 13:05 | | Second period | 18:52 – Arshdeep Bains (2) |
| | | Third period | 1:52 – Jujhar Khaira (3); 11:50 – Max Sasson (4); 19:25 – en – Arshdeep Bains (3) |
| Magnus Hellberg (36 saves / 39 shots) | | Goalie stats | Arturs Silovs (23 saves / 25 shots) |

| Abbotsford won series 4–2 |

== Calder Cup finals ==
=== (A2) Charlotte Checkers vs. (P2) Abbotsford Canucks ===
| June 13 | Abbotsford Canucks | 4–3 | 2OT | Charlotte Checkers | Bojangles Coliseum | Recap |
| Max Sasson (5) – pp – 4:34 | | First period | | 7:59 – MacKenzie Entwistle (2); 19:59 – Oliver Okuliar (3) |
| Nathan Smith (4) – 7:30 | | Second period | | 7:08 – Justin Sourdif (4) |
| Ty Mueller (3) – 8:14 | | Third period | | No scoring |
| Danila Klimovich (3) – pp – 10:25 | | Second overtime period | | No scoring |
| Arturs Silovs (51 saves / 54 shots) | | Goalie stats | | Kaapo Kahkonen (26 saves / 30 shots) |

| June 15 | Abbotsford Canucks | 2–3 | OT | Charlotte Checkers | Bojangles Coliseum | Recap |
| Sammy Blais (4) – 4:15; Linus Karlsson (10) – pp – 17:38 | | First period | | 3:13 – John Leonard (7); 11:14 – pp – Wilmer Skoog (4) |
| No scoring | | Second period | | No scoring |
| No scoring | | Third period | | No scoring |
| No scoring | | First overtime period | | 4:02 – pp – Michael Benning (5) |
| Arturs Silovs (39 saves / 42 shots) | | Goalie stats | | Kaapo Kahkonen (11 saves / 13 shots) |

| June 17 | Charlotte Checkers | 1–6 | Abbotsford Canucks | Abbotsford Centre | Recap |
| Oliver Okuliar (4) – 8:22 | | First period | No scoring |
| No scoring | | Second period | 6:43 – pp – Sammy Blais (5) |
| No scoring | | Third period | 3:58 – Linus Karlsson (11); 11:43 – pp – Arshdeep Bains (4); 13:19 – Phillip Di Giuseppe (6); 17:10 – en – Arshdeep Bains (5); 17:34 – Tristen Nielsen (5) |
| Kaapo Kahkonen (23 saves / 28 shots) | | Goalie stats | Arturs Silovs (28 saves / 29 shots) |

| June 19 | Charlotte Checkers | 2–3 | Abbotsford Canucks | Abbotsford Centre | Recap |
| No scoring | | First period | 1:15 – Jonathan Lekkerimaki (2) |
| No scoring | | Second period | 11:30 – Arshdeep Bains (6) |
| Kyle Criscuolo (2) – pp – 8:34; Jack Devine (1) – 19:33 | | Third period | 3:47 – Jonathan Lekkerimaki (3) |
| Kaapo Kahkonen (20 saves / 23 shots) | | Goalie stats | Arturs Silovs (32 saves / 34 shots) |

| June 21 | Charlotte Checkers | 4–3 | OT | Abbotsford Canucks | Abbotsford Centre | Recap |
| Ben Steeves (4) – 12:55 | | First period | | 15:04 – pp – Linus Karlsson (12) |
| Brett Chorske (2) – 3:12; Rasmus Asplund (5) – pp – 12:12 | | Second period | | 3:53 – Arshdeep Bains (7); 5:11 – Linus Karlsson (13) |
| No scoring | | Third period | | No scoring |
| Jesse Puljujarvi (3) – 15:22 | | First overtime period | | No scoring |
| Kaapo Kahkonen (29 saves / 32 shots) | | Goalie stats | | Arturs Silovs (36 saves / 40 shots) |

| June 23 | Abbotsford Canucks | 3–2 | Charlotte Checkers | Bojangles Coliseum | Recap |
| Sammy Blais (6) – pp – 17:38 | | First period | 2:49 – John Leonard (8); 13:14 – Jack Devine (2) |
| Danila Klimovich (4) – 3:44; Linus Karlsson (14) – 17:19 | | Second period | No scoring |
| No scoring | | Third period | No scoring |
| Arturs Silovs (28 saves / 30 shots) | | Goalie stats | Kaapo Kahkonen (17 saves / 20 shots) |

| Abbotsford won series 4–2 |

== Playoff statistical leaders ==
=== Leading skaters ===
These are the top ten skaters based on points. If there is a tie in points, goals take precedence over assists. Updated following games played on June 23, 2025.

| Player | Team | GP | G | A | Pts | PIM |
|---|---|---|---|---|---|---|
| Linus Karlsson | Abbotsford Canucks | 24 | 14 | 12 | 26 | 28 |
| Arshdeep Bains | Abbotsford Canucks | 24 | 7 | 17 | 24 | 24 |
| Sammy Blais | Abbotsford Canucks | 23 | 6 | 13 | 19 | 77 |
| Cameron Hughes | Texas Stars | 14 | 4 | 15 | 19 | 7 |
| Justin Hryckowian | Texas Stars | 14 | 9 | 9 | 18 | 10 |
| Matej Blumel | Texas Stars | 14 | 7 | 9 | 16 | 6 |
| Kole Lind | Texas Stars | 14 | 8 | 7 | 15 | 18 |
| John Leonard | Charlotte Checkers | 18 | 8 | 6 | 14 | 18 |
| Max Sasson | Abbotsford Canucks | 24 | 5 | 9 | 14 | 18 |
| Kyle Capobianco | Texas Stars | 14 | 2 | 11 | 13 | 10 |

=== Leading goaltenders ===
This is a combined table of the top five goaltenders based on goals against average and the top five goaltenders based on save percentage with at least 60 minutes played. The table is initially sorted by goals against average, with the criterion for inclusion in bold. Updated following games played on June 23, 2025.

| Player | Team | GP | W | L | SA | GA | GAA | SV% | SO | TOI |
|---|---|---|---|---|---|---|---|---|---|---|
| Yaroslav Askarov | San Jose Barracuda | 6 | 3 | 2 | 155 | 10 | **1.68** | **.935** | 1 | 357:49 |
| Michael DiPietro | Providence Bruins | 7 | 3 | 3 | 152 | 11 | **1.85** | .928 | 1 | 356:35 |
| Waltteri Ignatjew | Calgary Wranglers | 2 | 0 | 2 | 69 | 5 | **1.90** | .928 | 0 | 157:55 |
| Nikke Kokko | Coachella Valley Firebirds | 6 | 3 | 3 | 165 | 13 | **1.95** | .921 | 1 | 399:23 |
| Parker Gahagen | Lehigh Valley Phantoms | 5 | 3 | 1 | 126 | 9 | **2.00** | **.929** | 0 | 269:35 |
| Arturs Silovs | Abbotsford Canucks | 24 | 16 | 7 | 722 | 50 | 2.01 | **.931** | 5 | 1,492:35 |
| Colten Ellis | Springfield Thunderbirds | 3 | 1 | 2 | 104 | 7 | 2.32 | **.933** | 0 | 181:10 |
| Jaxson Stauber | Tucson Roadrunners | 2 | 1 | 1 | 77 | 5 | 2.61 | **.935** | 0 | 115:02 |
