= Danila Klimovich =

Belarusian ice hockey player (born 2003)

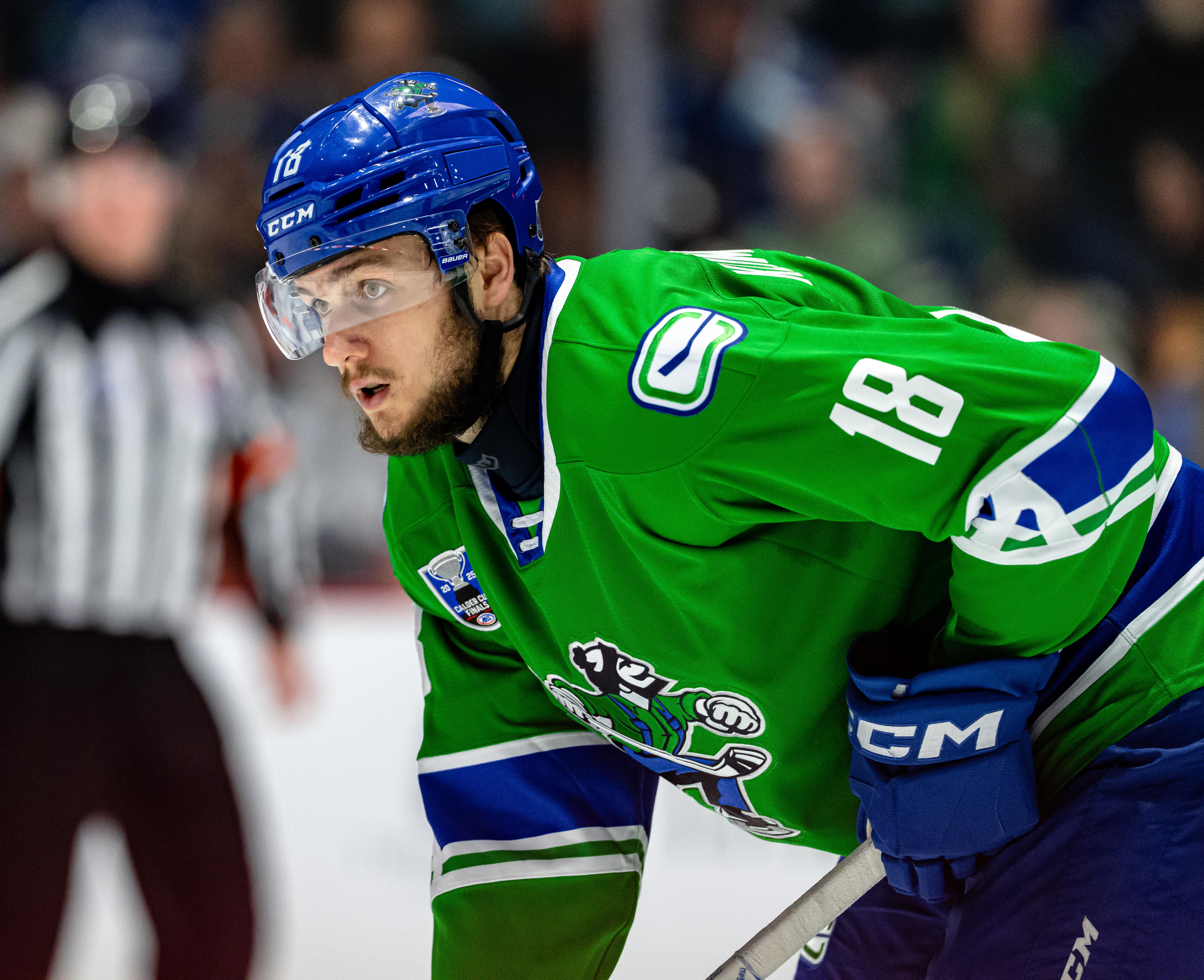
- Klimovich with the Abbotsford Canucks in 2025.
- Born: 9 January 2003 (age 23) Pinsk, Belarus
- Height: 6 ft 1 in (185 cm)
- Weight: 187 lb (85 kg; 13 st 5 lb)
- Position: Centre
- Shoots: Right
- NHL team Former teams: Philadelphia Flyers; Dinamo Molodechno
- National team: Belarus
- NHL draft: 41st overall, 2021; Vancouver Canucks
- Playing career: 2019–present

Danila Vitalevich Klimovich (Russian: Данила Витальевич Климович; born 9 January 2003) is a Belarusian ice hockey centre under contract to the Philadelphia Flyers of the National Hockey League (NHL). He was selected 41st overall by the Vancouver Canucks in the 2021 NHL entry draft. Internationally he has played for the Belarusian national team at the 2021 World Championships.

== Playing career ==
Klimovich began his career in his native Belarus. In 2020 he was selected by the Rouyn-Noranda Huskies of the Quebec Major Junior Hockey League at the CHL Import Draft. While he planned to move to North America for the 2020–21, the COVID-19 pandemic kept him from doing so. Instead he spent most of the 2020–21 season playing for Minskie Zubry of the Vysshaya Liga, the second-tier league in Belarus, where he had 52 points in 37 games. He also played six games in the Belarusian Extraleague with Dinamo Molodechno, and scored one goal.

Going into the 2021 NHL entry draft Klimovich was rated by the NHL's Central Scouting Bureau as the 19th best European-based skater. He was selected 41st overall by the Vancouver Canucks. Klimovich was described as being "a big guy" (at the time of the draft he was 6 ft 0 in (1.83 m) and 202 pounds (92 kg)), and "intriguing", who could use both his body and skill to make plays. He signed with the Canucks on 28 July 2021.

Klimovich moved to North America after the draft and was assigned to the Canucks' American Hockey League (AHL) affiliate, the Abbotsford Canucks. The youngest player in the AHL during the 2021–22 season, Klimovich recorded 8 goals and 18 assists in 63 games, though did not play in any of the team's playoff games.

On 23 June 2025, Klimovich won the Calder Cup as a member of the Abbotsford Canucks.

On 1 July 2026, having left the Canucks organization after five seasons, Klimovich was signed to a one-year, two-way contract with the Philadelphia Flyers for the 2026–27 season.

== International play ==
Klimovich played for the Belarusian under-18 national team at the 2021 World U18 Championships, where he had 6 goals in 5 games, including a hat-trick against Switzerland. He made his debut with the Belarus senior team at the 2021 World Championships, appearing in three games.

== Personal life ==
A native of Belarus, Klimovich moved to North America in 2021 after being drafted by the Canucks. He married Nastassia Bartsevich on 10 April 2022 in Cultus Lake, British Columbia.

== Career statistics ==
=== Regular season and playoffs ===
			Regular season					Playoffs
Season	Team	League	GP	G	A	Pts	PIM	GP	G	A	Pts	PIM
2018–19	HK Brest-2	BLR-2	19	7	2	9	8	—	—	—	—	—
2018–19	Belarus U17	BLR-2	10	2	2	4	0	11	1	1	2	14
2019–20	Belarus U17	BLR-2	16	13	6	19	8	16	5	6	11	6
2019–20	Belarus U18	BLR-2	5	1	2	3	6	—	—	—	—	—
2019–20	Belarus U20	BLR-3	32	13	10	23	16	—	—	—	—	—
2020–21	Dinamo Molodechno	BLR	6	1	0	1	0	—	—	—	—	—
2020–21	Minskie Zubry	BLR-2	37	28	24	52	40	12	9	5	14	8
2021–22	Abbotsford Canucks	AHL	62	8	10	18	33	—	—	—	—	—
2022–23	Abbotsford Canucks	AHL	67	17	12	29	53	6	0	0	0	0
2023–24	Abbotsford Canucks	AHL	24	2	2	4	20	—	—	—	—	—
2024–25	Abbotsford Canucks	AHL	65	25	13	38	59	16	4	0	4	12
2025–26	Abbotsford Canucks	AHL	63	18	16	34	62	—	—	—	—	—
AHL totals			281	70	53	123	227	22	4	0	4	12

=== International ===
Year	Team	Event	GP	G	A	Pts	PIM
2021	Belarus	U18	5	6	0	6	4
2021	Belarus	WC	3	0	0	0	0
Junior totals			5	6	0	6	4
Senior totals			3	0	0	0	0

== Awards and honors ==
Award	Year	Ref
AHL
Calder Cup	2025	
