= Artūrs Šilovs =

Latvian ice hockey player (born 2001)

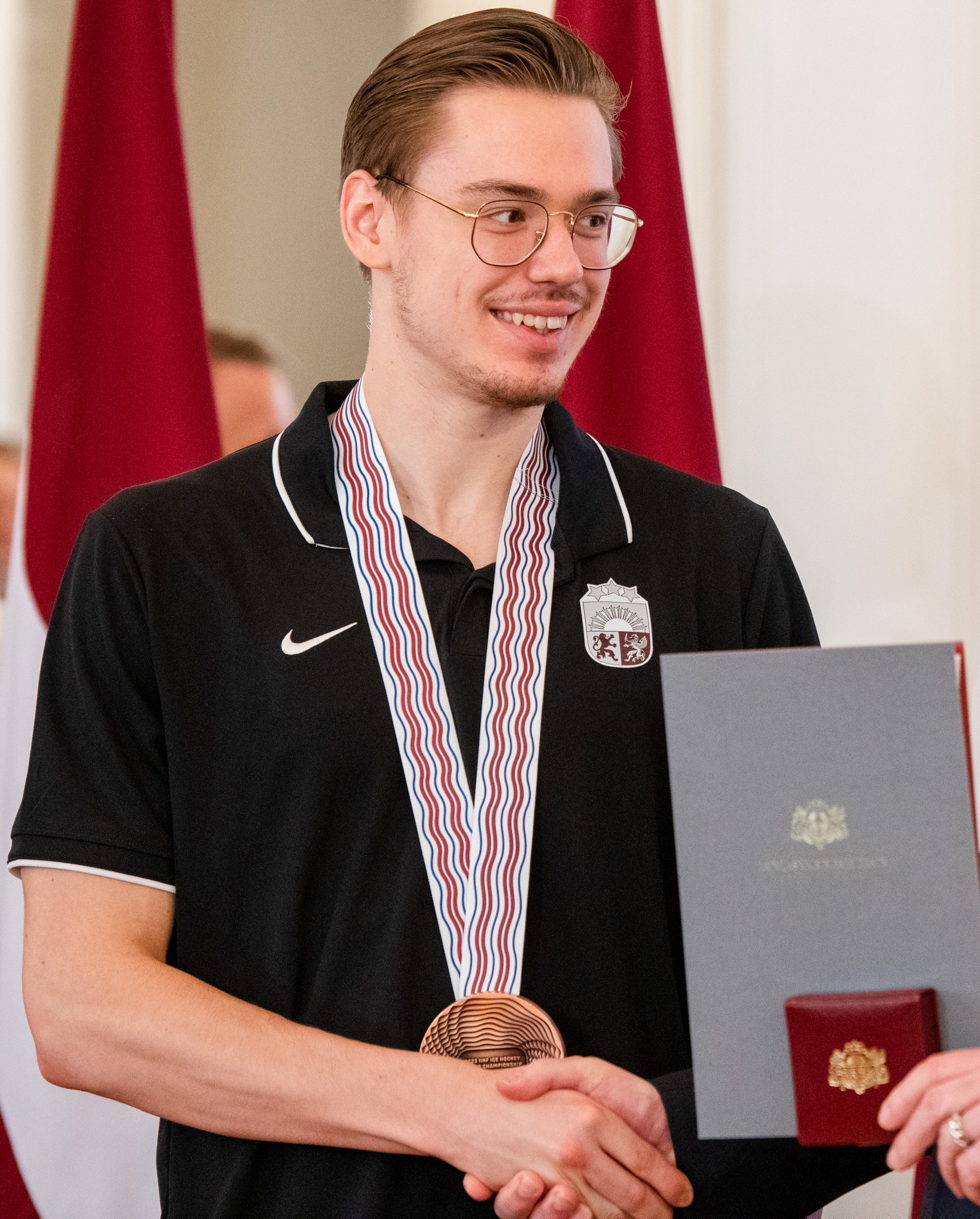
- Šilovs in 2023
- Born: 22 March 2001 (age 25) Ventspils, Latvia
- Height: 6 ft 4 in (193 cm)
- Weight: 208 lb (94 kg; 14 st 12 lb)
- Position: Goaltender
- Catches: Left
- NHL team Former teams: Pittsburgh Penguins; HS Rīga; HK Mogo; Vancouver Canucks
- National team: Latvia
- NHL draft: 156th overall, 2019; Vancouver Canucks
- Playing career: 2021–present

Artūrs Šilovs (born 22 March 2001) is a Latvian professional ice hockey player who is a goaltender for the Pittsburgh Penguins of the National Hockey League (NHL). Šilovs was drafted in the sixth round, 156th overall, by the Vancouver Canucks at the 2019 NHL entry draft, with whom he made his NHL debut in 2023. Playing with the Latvian national team, Šilovs played a central role in the country's first-ever medal at the World Championships in 2023.

Šilovs spent most of his Canucks tenure with the team's American Hockey League (AHL) affiliate in Abbotsford, with whom he won a Calder Cup championship in 2025. Unable to secure a full-time NHL roster spot, he was traded to the Penguins months later.

== Playing career ==
Šilovs started his hockey career with HS Rīga of the Optibet Hockey League.

=== Vancouver Canucks ===
On 22 June 2019, Šilovs was selected by the Vancouver Canucks in the sixth round, 156th overall, of the 2019 NHL entry draft. On 27 June 2019, he was subsequently selected 11th overall by the Barrie Colts of the Ontario Hockey League (OHL) in the 2019 CHL Import Draft. Šilovs signed a contract with Vancouver on 23 August 2019. In September 2019, he signed with Barrie for the 2019–20 OHL season.

Šilovs began the 2020–21 season playing for HS Rīga and HK Mogo. On 19 January 2021, he was assigned to the Manitoba Moose of the American Hockey League (AHL). He made his AHL debut for Manitoba on 27 February 2021.

In the 2021–22 AHL season, he played for the Abbotsford Canucks, recording a .888 save percentage for the team in 10 games.

Šilovs made his NHL debut with the Vancouver Canucks on 15 February 2023, against the New York Rangers. He finished the 2022–23 season playing five games for Vancouver and 44 games for Abbotsford, being named the team MVP for Abbotsford.

Continuing to play primarily in Abbotsford through the 2023–24 season, Šilovs was called up to make his Stanley Cup playoffs debut following injuries to Vancouver's regular goaltenders, Thatcher Demko and Casey DeSmith, three games into the Canucks' first-round series against the Nashville Predators. On 28 April 2024, he started his first playoff game, stopping 27 of 30 shots and helping the Canucks to a 4–3 win. Šilovs retained the net even after DeSmith's return to the roster, and on 3 May, he recorded his first playoff shutout in Vancouver's series-clinching game 6, a 1–0 win. He became the youngest goaltender in franchise history to earn a playoff shutout. In July 2024, Šilovs signed a two-year contract extension with the Canucks.

As the starting goaltender for the Abbotsford Canucks in the 2025 AHL playoffs, Šilovs led his team to a Calder Cup championship, winning the Jack A. Butterfield Trophy as playoffs MVP for his efforts.

=== Pittsburgh Penguins ===
Prior to the start of the 2025–26 season, Šilovs was traded to the Pittsburgh Penguins for Chase Stillman and a 2027 fourth-round pick. He was named the starting goaltender by new head coach Dan Muse ahead of the season opener against the New York Rangers. He went on to make 25 saves to earn his first regular season shutout in the eventual 3–0 win. In the process, Šilovs joined Maxime Lagacé as the only Penguins goaltenders to earn a shutout in their Pittsburgh debut and Marc-André Fleury as the second-ever goaltender to earn an opening-night shutout for the team.

On 5 July 2026 as a restricted free agent, Šilovs signed a one-year, $2.8 million contract to avoid contract arbitration.

== International play ==
Medal record

Men's ice hockey

Representing Latvia

World Championships
Bronze medal – third place	2023 Finland/Latvia	

Šilovs made his international debut with Latvia under-18 team at the 2019 World U18 Championships, where his team placed eighth. Three years later, he accepted his first invitation to join the senior national team at the 2022 World Championship, where he played four games and recorded a .952 save percentage. He began the tournament as backup goaltender to Columbus Blue Jackets starter Elvis Merzļikins but was judged to have significantly outperformed Merzļikins during the tournament, and was given the start in the team's final game in the group stage. Latvia did not advance to the knockout rounds.

After his strong showing at the 2022 championships, Šilovs rejoined the national team for the 2023 World Championship, which was jointly hosted by Latvia and Finland. Šilovs relieved goaltender Ivars Punnenovs early in the team's first game of the tournament, and thereafter started every game for Latvia, leading them on an unexpectedly deep run to the bronze medal game. There they defeated the heavily favoured United States national team, winning the bronze medal, the first of any medals for Latvia at an IIHF World Championship. Šilovs played 60 minutes more than any other goaltender in the tournament. In recognition of his pivotal role in the team's success, he was named the championship's best goaltender and most valuable player (MVP) by the IIHF directorate, as well as to the Media All-Star Team. Following the historic result, the Latvian Saeima declared a public holiday. Šilovs later finished second in the voting for the inaugural IIHF Male Player of the Year award, behind Connor Bedard.

Šilovs played in 2026 Winter Olympics for Latvia. He played in three of the four games Latvia played in the tournament, leading the nation to their fourth win all-time in Olympic tournaments with NHL players participating in their game against Germany.

== Personal life ==
Šilovs was born in Ventspils, Latvia. He learned to skate when he was three years old, playing forward at that time. When he was six years old, he became a goaltender. When he was ten years old, he moved to Riga.

He married his wife, Vendija, on 23 August 2019, when he was 18. The pair divorced in 2023.

Public art was placed in downtown Riga in Šilovs' name after his world championship run.

== Career statistics ==
=== Regular season and playoffs ===
Bold indicates led league

			Regular season									Playoffs
Season	Team	League	GP	W	L	OTL	MIN	GA	SO	GAA	SV%	GP	W	L	MIN	GA	SO	GAA	SV%
2017–18	SK Rīga 17	LHL.1	8	—	—	—	447	17	1	2.28	—	6	—	—	260	14	0	3.22	—
2018–19	HK Riga	MHL	7	3	4	0	342	14	1	2.45	.920	—	—	—	—	—	—	—	—
2018–19	HS Rīga	LHL	20	8	11	0	1,103	60	2	3.26	.914	—	—	—	—	—	—	—	—
2019–20	Barrie Colts	OHL	36	16	13	4	2,030	131	1	3.87	.891	—	—	—	—	—	—	—	—
2020–21	HS Rīga	LHL	2	0	1	1	124	9	0	4.34	.923	—	—	—	—	—	—	—	—
2020–21	HK Mogo	LHL	4	2	2	0	234	10	0	2.56	.899	—	—	—	—	—	—	—	—
2020–21	Manitoba Moose	AHL	1	0	1	0	58	2	0	2.07	.920	—	—	—	—	—	—	—	—
2021–22	Abbotsford Canucks	AHL	10	3	6	0	542	28	1	3.10	.888	—	—	—	—	—	—	—	—
2021–22	Trois-Rivières Lions	ECHL	10	6	3	1	609	24	1	2.37	.920	—	—	—	—	—	—	—	—
2022–23	Abbotsford Canucks	AHL	44	26	12	5	2,554	104	4	2.44	.909	2	1	1	126	6	0	2.85	.914
2022–23	Vancouver Canucks	NHL	5	3	2	0	306	14	0	2.75	.908	—	—	—	—	—	—	—	—
2023–24	Abbotsford Canucks	AHL	34	16	11	6	2,015	92	4	2.74	.907	—	—	—	—	—	—	—	—
2023–24	Vancouver Canucks	NHL	4	3	0	1	243	10	0	2.47	.881	10	5	5	598	29	1	2.91	.898
2024–25	Vancouver Canucks	NHL	10	2	6	1	543	33	0	3.65	.861	—	—	—	—	—	—	—	—
2024–25	Abbotsford Canucks	AHL	21	14	5	1	1,246	50	0	2.41	.908	24	16	7	1,492	50	**5**	2.01	.931
2025–26	Pittsburgh Penguins	NHL	39	19	12	8	2,247	115	2	3.07	.888	3	2	1	197	5	0	1.52	.939
NHL totals			58	27	20	10	3,338	172	2	3.09	.886	13	7	6	796	34	1	2.56	.907
LHL totals			26	10	14	1	1,462	79	2	3.04	.914	—	—	—	—	—	—	—	—

=== International ===
Year	Team	Event	Result	GP	W	L	T	MIN	GA	SO	GAA	SV%
2018	Latvia	U18-IA	11th	2	2	0	0	120	2	0	1.00	.960
2019	Latvia	U18	8th	5	1	4	0	271	15	1	3.32	.918
2022	Latvia	WC	10th	4	2	2	0	196	4	0	1.22	.952
2023	Latvia	WC	3rd place, bronze medalist(s)	10	7	2	0	601	22	1	2.20	.921
2026	Latvia	OG	10th	3	1	2	0	140	7	0	3.01	.873
Junior totals				7	3	4	0	391	17	1	2.61	.932
Senior totals				17	10	6	0	937	33	1	2.14	.915

== Awards and honours ==
Award	Year	Ref
International
World Championship Best Goaltender	2023	
World Championship Media All-Star Team	2023	
World Championship MVP	2023	
AHL
Calder Cup	2025	
Jack A. Butterfield Trophy	2025	
