= Tristen Nielsen =

Canadian ice hockey player (born 2000)

- Born: February 23, 2000 (age 26) Fort St. John, British Columbia, Canada
- Height: 5 ft 10 in (178 cm)
- Weight: 192 lb (87 kg; 13 st 10 lb)
- Position: Wing/Centre
- Shoots: Left
- NHL team (P) Cur. team: Colorado Avalanche; Colorado Eagles (AHL)
- NHL draft: Undrafted
- Playing career: 2021–present

Tristen Nielsen (born February 23, 2000) is a Canadian professional ice hockey forward for the Colorado Eagles in the American Hockey League (AHL) while under contract to the Colorado Avalanche of the National Hockey League (NHL).

== Playing career ==
Nielsen played junior hockey in the Western Hockey League for the Calgary Hitmen and Vancouver Giants. He went undrafted in the 2018 NHL entry draft. He started his professional career in the 2021–22 season with the Abbotsford Canucks of the American Hockey League (AHL).

On July 1, 2023, the Vancouver Canucks of the National Hockey League (NHL), the primary affiliate of Abbotsford, signed Nielsen to a two-year, two-way deal.

He won the 2025 Calder Cup with the Canucks in the 2024–25 AHL season.

As a free agent from the Canucks, on August 1, 2025, Nielsen signed a one-year contract with the AHL Colorado Eagles. He attended the Colorado Avalanche training camp on invitation, impressing through the pre-season before he was returned to begin the 2025–26 season with the Eagles. Continuing his early season production from pre-season, on October 27, he signed a two-year, two-way contract with the Colorado Avalanche of the NHL. He made his NHL debut for the Avalanche on November 4, 2025 against the Tampa Bay Lightning. He was on the ice for eight shifts with 5 minutes and 25 seconds of ice time. He was recalled again on November 20 to play against the New York Rangers. He recorded his first NHL assist on a Cale Makar goal during a game against the Chicago Blackhawks on November 23, 2025.

== Career statistics ==
=== Regular season and playoffs ===
			Regular season					Playoffs
Season	Team	League	GP	G	A	Pts	PIM	GP	G	A	Pts	PIM
2015–16	Calgary Hitmen	WHL	3	1	0	1	0	—	—	—	—	—
2016–17	Calgary Hitmen	WHL	49	3	4	7	19	4	1	0	1	2
2017–18	Calgary Hitmen	WHL	49	19	16	35	24	—	—	—	—	—
2018–19	Calgary Hitmen	WHL	5	0	0	0	13	—	—	—	—	—
2018–19	Vancouver Giants	WHL	52	14	21	35	56	22	3	10	13	16
2019–20	Vancouver Giants	WHL	61	30	35	65	70	—	—	—	—	—
2020–21	Vancouver Giants	WHL	22	15	17	32	14	—	—	—	—	—
2021–22	Abbotsford Canucks	AHL	41	7	4	11	17	—	—	—	—	—
2022–23	Abbotsford Canucks	AHL	64	14	27	41	60	6	2	2	4	6
2023–24	Abbotsford Canucks	AHL	59	16	19	35	52	6	0	4	4	2
2024–25	Abbotsford Canucks	AHL	67	15	13	28	56	24	5	4	9	38
2025–26	Colorado Eagles	AHL	66	28	21	49	62	17	10	7	17	8
2025–26	Colorado Avalanche	NHL	4	0	1	1	0	—	—	—	—	—
NHL totals			4	0	1	1	0	—	—	—	—	—

=== International ===
Year	Team	Event	Result	GP	G	A	Pts	PIM
2016	Canada White	U17	4th	6	4	0	4	4
Junior totals				6	4	0	4	4

== Awards and honours ==
Award	Year
AHL
Calder Cup	2025
