= Max Sasson =

American ice hockey player (born 2000)

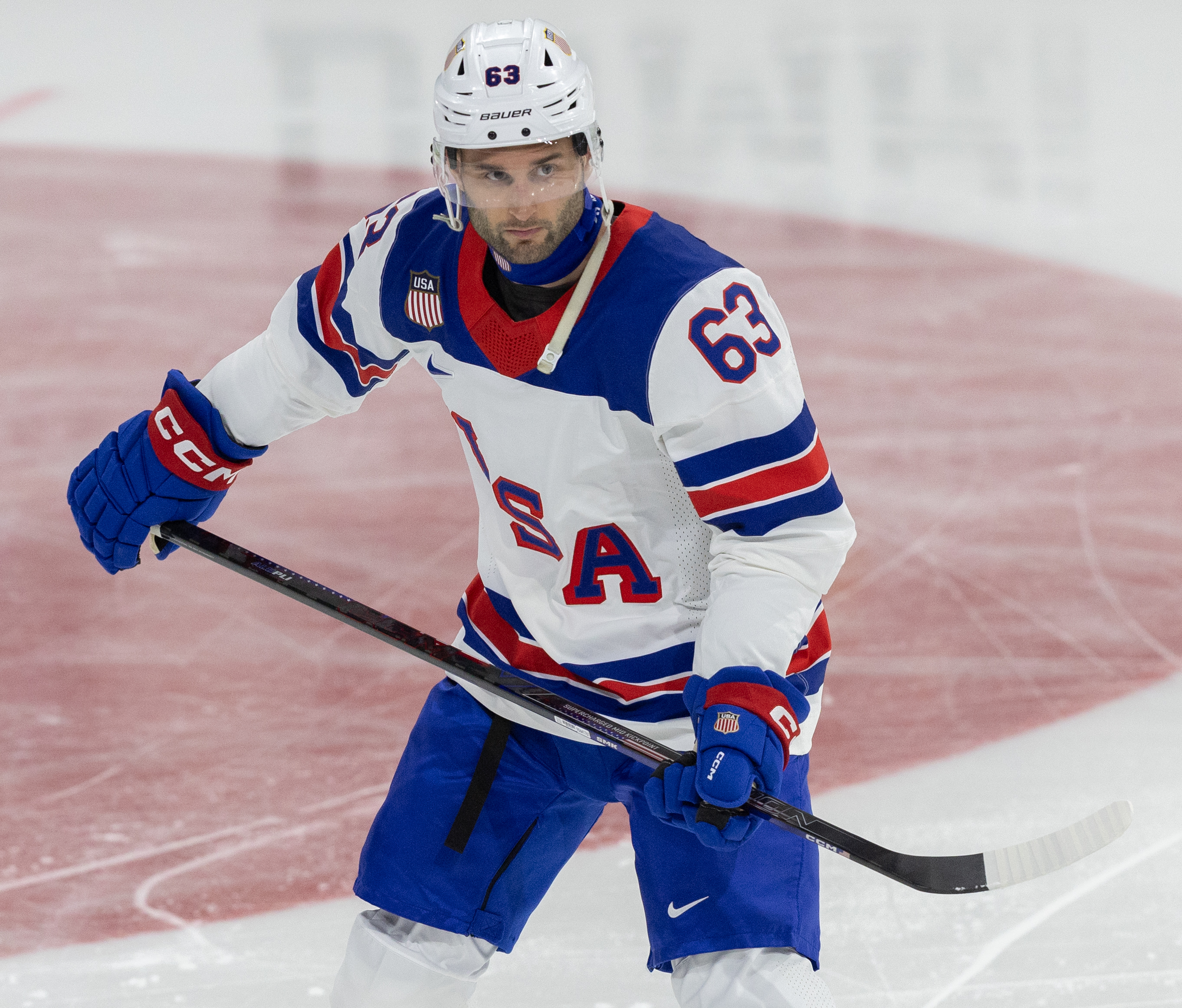
- Sasson with the United States in 2026
- Born: September 5, 2000 (age 26) Birmingham, Michigan, U.S.
- Height: 6 ft 1 in (185 cm)
- Weight: 181 lb (82 kg; 12 st 13 lb)
- Position: Forward
- Shoots: Left
- NHL team Former teams: New York Rangers; Vancouver Canucks
- National team: United States
- NHL draft: Undrafted
- Playing career: 2023–present

Max Sasson (born September 5, 2000) is an American professional ice hockey player who is a forward for the New York Rangers of the National Hockey League (NHL). He played two seasons of college ice hockey for the Western Michigan Broncos and made his NHL debut in 2024.

== Early life ==
Sasson was born September 5, 2000, in Birmingham, Michigan, to Alan and Ellen Sasson. Sasson spent his junior ice hockey career with the Cedar Rapids RoughRiders of the United States Hockey League (USHL). During two seasons there, he recorded 19 goals and 23 assists in 107 regular season games. When the August 2020 Midwest derecho caused severe damage to ImOn Ice Arena in Cedar Rapids, Sasson was dispersed to the Waterloo Black Hawks for the 2020–21 USHL season. There, he led the team with 20 goals and 49 points in 49 games.

== Career ==
=== College ===
After leaving the USHL, Sasson joined the Western Michigan Broncos for his college ice hockey career. He was named the National Collegiate Hockey Conference (NCHC) rookie of the month for January 2022 after recording two goals and five points in a four-game span. After a slow start to his freshman year, recording only three points through his first 18 games, Sasson began producing in the second half, finishing the 2021–22 season with nine goals and 22 points in 37 games. He was also named to the NCHC Academic All-Conference team, maintaining a grade point average of at least 3.50 that year.

During the 2022–23 season, Sasson was the Broncos' top-line center, playing on a line with Ryan McAllister and Jason Polin. That season, he was third on the team with 42 points, including 15 goals, and led the Broncos to their best NCHC finish in program history. He was the NCHC player of the month for March 2023, with ten points in five games, including a hat trick against the Miami RedHawks. In two seasons with Western Michigan, Sasson had 24 goals and 64 points in 75 games.

=== Professional ===
On March 26, 2023, Sasson signed a two-year, entry-level contract with the Vancouver Canucks. He joined the Abbotsford Canucks, Vancouver's American Hockey League (AHL) affiliate, for the remainder of the 2022–23 season, playing on a line with Kyle Rau and Nils Höglander. In a combined seven regular-season and six postseason games for Abbotsford, Sasson had three goals and one assist. In preparation for his full rookie season, Sasson spent the 2023 off-season increasing his physicality. He had 18 goals and 42 points in 59 games during the 2023–24 season, with his performance the strongest after returning from injury in April 2024. He added another goal and two assists in six games of the 2024 Calder Cup playoffs.

Sasson began the 2024–25 season in Abbotsford, leading the team with nine points through the first 16 games of the year. With Brock Boeser and J. T. Miller unavailable, Sasson was called up to Vancouver to make his NHL debut against the Ottawa Senators on November 23, 2024. He recorded his first NHL point in the 4–3 victory, assisting on Teddy Blueger's second-period goal. After recording two assists in five games for Vancouver, Sasson was returned to Abbotsford on December 5. Sasson scored his first NHL goal against the Boston Bruins on December 14, in a game that Vancouver lost 5–1.

On 23 June 2025, Sasson won the Calder Cup as a member of the Abbotsford Canucks.

Sasson began the 2025–26 season in Abbotsford. He was called up to Vancouver on October 14, 2025, to replace Braeden Cootes, who was returned to the Seattle Thunderbirds of the Western Hockey League (WHL). Sasson signed a two-year, $2 million contract extension with the Canucks on December 15.

During the 2026–27 season Sasson recorded five goals and three assists in 24 games for Vancouver before he was traded to the New York Rangers in exchange for a 2029 fourth-round pick on November 20, 2026.

== International play ==
Sasson made his international debut at the 2026 World Championship. Representing the United States national team, he played on the third line with Paul Cotter and Mathieu Olivier, and recorded a goal and an assist in seven preliminary round games.

== Personal life ==
Sasson is Jewish and celebrated his bar mitzvah at Temple Beth El in Bloomfield Hills, Michigan.

== Career statistics ==
=== Regular season and playoffs ===
			Regular season					Playoffs
Season	Team	League	GP	G	A	Pts	PIM	GP	G	A	Pts	PIM
2017–18	Brookings Blizzard	NAHL	59	11	14	25	30	—	—	—	—	—
2017–18	Muskegon Lumberjacks	USHL	1	0	0	0	0	—	—	—	—	—
2018–19	Cedar Rapids RoughRiders	USHL	62	8	9	17	49	6	2	3	5	4
2019–20	Cedar Rapids RoughRiders	USHL	45	11	14	25	79	—	—	—	—	—
2020–21	Waterloo Black Hawks	USHL	48	20	29	49	50	—	—	—	—	—
2021–22	Western Michigan Broncos	NCHC	37	9	13	22	18	—	—	—	—	—
2022–23	Western Michigan Broncos	NCHC	38	15	27	42	18	—	—	—	—	—
2022–23	Abbotsford Canucks	AHL	7	1	1	2	4	6	1	0	1	0
2023–24	Abbotsford Canucks	AHL	56	18	24	42	36	6	1	2	3	4
2024–25	Abbotsford Canucks	AHL	41	13	19	32	18	24	5	9	14	18
2024–25	Vancouver Canucks	NHL	29	3	4	7	0	—	—	—	—	—
2025–26	Abbotsford Canucks	AHL	2	2	0	2	0	—	—	—	—	—
2025–26	Vancouver Canucks	NHL	66	13	6	19	26	—	—	—	—	—
2026–27	Vancouver Canucks	NHL	24	5	3	8	23	—	—	—	—	—
NHL totals			119	21	13	34	49	—	—	—	—	—

=== International ===
Year	Team	Event	Result	GP	G	A	Pts	PIM
2026	United States	WC	8th	8	1	1	2	4
Senior totals				8	1	1	2	4

== Awards and honors ==
Award	Year	Ref
AHL
Calder Cup champion	2025	

== See also ==
- List of select Jewish ice hockey players
