= Victor Mancini =

American ice hockey player (born 2002)

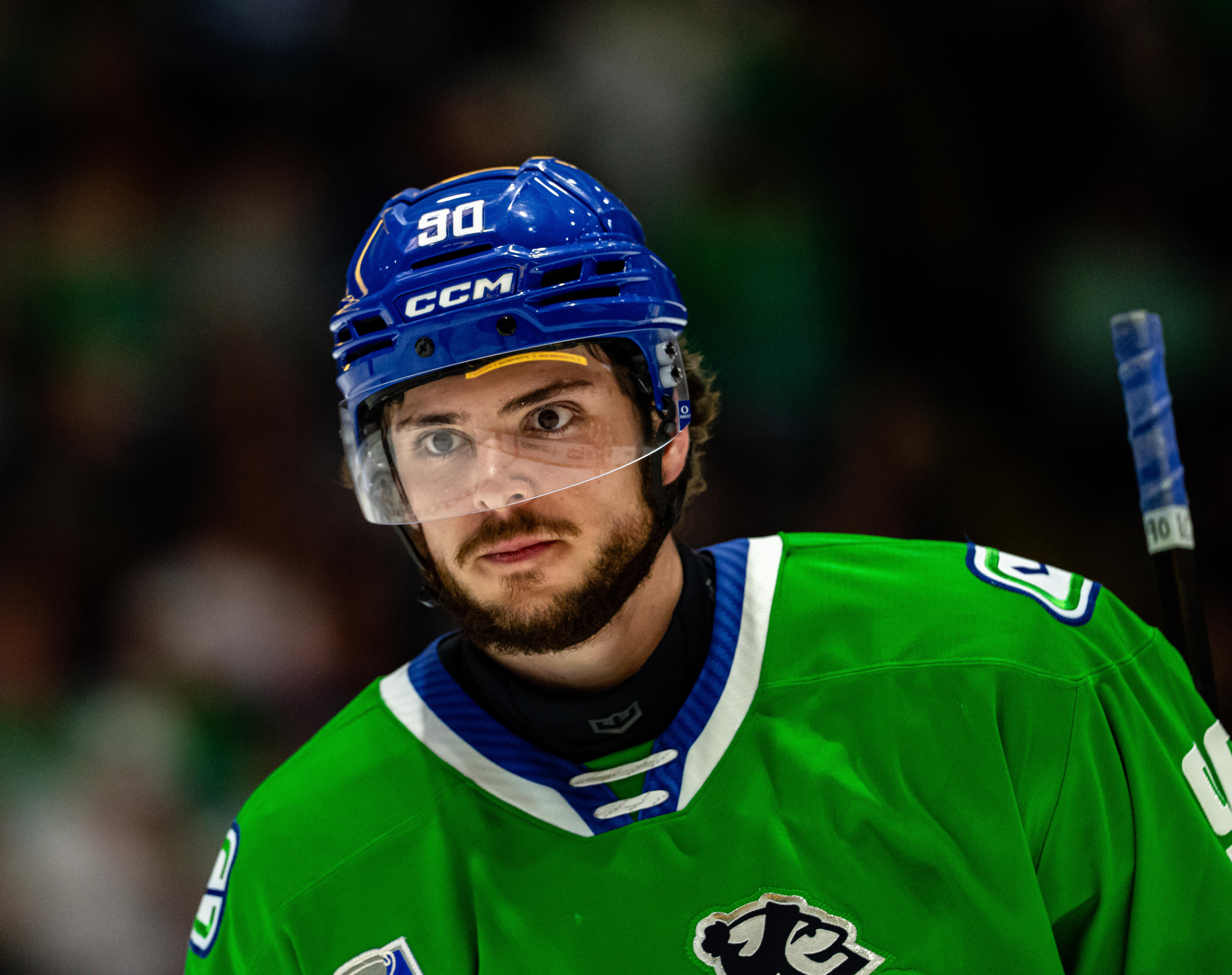
- Mancini with the Abbotsford Canucks in 2025.
- Born: May 26, 2002 (age 24) Hancock, Michigan, U.S.
- Height: 6 ft 4 in (193 cm)
- Weight: 220 lb (100 kg; 15 st 10 lb)
- Position: Defense
- Shoots: Right
- NHL team (P) Cur. team Former teams: Vancouver Canucks; Abbotsford Canucks (AHL); New York Rangers
- NHL draft: 159th overall, 2022; New York Rangers
- Playing career: 2021–present

Victor Mancini (born May 26, 2002) is an American professional ice hockey defenseman for the Abbotsford Canucks of the American Hockey League (AHL) as a prospect to the Vancouver Canucks of the National Hockey League (NHL).

== Playing career ==
Mancini played in Sweden for the Frölunda HC junior teams in the 2019–20 and 2020–21 seasons, serving as the team captain the second year. After a stint with the Sioux Falls Stampede and Green Bay Gamblers of the United States Hockey League (USHL), he then played college ice hockey for the University of Nebraska Omaha from 2021–22 to 2023–24 seasons. Mancini went undrafted in his first two years of draft eligibility, but while at the University of Nebraska Omaha, Mancini was drafted by the New York Rangers in the fifth round of the 2022 NHL entry draft.

Mancini signed a professional contract with the Rangers in April 2024. He played seven games for the Rangers' American Hockey League (AHL) affiliate, the Hartford Wolf Pack, at the end of the 2023–24 season, collecting three assists. He added three assists in 10 playoff games with Hartford.

Mancini had a strong training camp for the Rangers in the fall of 2024. That, along with his ability to play on the left side despite being a right-handed shot, gave Mancini an opportunity to earn a spot on the Rangers opening night roster for the 2024–25 season after an injury to Rangers' regular defenseman Ryan Lindgren. Mancini was demoted to Hartford along with several other waiver-exempt players two days before the start of the regular season in a move to save salary cap space, but was recalled to the Rangers prior to their opening game. He made his NHL debut in the Rangers' opening night game against the Pittsburgh Penguins on October 9, 2024. He scored his first NHL goal against his home-state team, the Detroit Red Wings, on October 17.

On January 31, 2025, Mancini, center Filip Chytil and a conditional 2025 first-round pick were traded to the Canucks in exchange for forward J. T. Miller, defenseman Erik Brännström and the rights to defenseman Jackson Dorrington.

On June 23, 2025, Mancini won the Calder Cup as a member of the Abbotsford Canucks.

== Playing style ==
Upon being drafted, Mancini's main attributes were his strength and physicality. According to hockey scout Jess Rubenstein, Mancini is "the prototype stay-at-home defenseman, with excellent on-ice vision. He's more a passer than a scorer but his offense is coming around. His game is a lot like Marc Staal's when Marc was a Ranger."

Early in the 2024–25 season Rangers' head coach Peter Laviolette said of why he was keeping Mancini on the team, despite Lindgren's return:

A little bit of everything to be honest, it’s his skating, it’s his size, it’s his poise with the puck. He plays a physical game inside of his own elements. He’s big and he’s hard to play against. He does the right things with the puck. He’s very coachable as well. I think he’s had a really strong start to the season.

== Personal life ==
Mancini's father Bob Mancini served as the head coach of several college ice hockey teams, including Ferris State University and Michigan Tech, and also helped found USA Hockey's National Team Development Program, and served as a scout for the Edmonton Oilers.

== Career statistics ==
			Regular season					Playoffs
Season	Team	League	GP	G	A	Pts	PIM	GP	G	A	Pts	PIM
2018–19	U.S. National Development Team	USHL	1	0	0	0	0	—	—	—	—	—
2018–19	Sioux Falls Stampede	USHL	3	0	0	0	0	—	—	—	—	—
2019–20	Frölunda HC	J20	38	9	5	14	24	—	—	—	—	—
2020–21	Frölunda HC	J20	19	5	5	10	10	—	—	—	—	—
2020–21	Hanhals IF	Div.1	5	1	0	1	2	—	—	—	—	—
2020–21	Green Bay Gamblers	USHL	33	4	9	13	12	2	0	0	0	0
2021–22	University of Nebraska Omaha	NCHC	38	0	5	5	26	—	—	—	—	—
2022–23	University of Nebraska Omaha	NCHC	32	0	8	8	10	—	—	—	—	—
2023–24	University of Nebraska Omaha	NCHC	40	4	6	10	8	—	—	—	—	—
2023–24	Hartford Wolf Pack	AHL	7	0	3	3	4	10	0	3	3	6
2024–25	New York Rangers	NHL	15	1	4	5	2	—	—	—	—	—
2024–25	Hartford Wolf Pack	AHL	23	3	7	10	12	—	—	—	—	—
2024–25	Abbotsford Canucks	AHL	7	1	2	3	2	24	3	5	8	8
2024–25	Vancouver Canucks	NHL	16	1	2	3	8	—	—	—	—	—
2025–26	Vancouver Canucks	NHL	24	0	3	3	7	—	—	—	—	—
2025–26	Abbotsford Canucks	AHL	33	4	8	12	16	—	—	—	—	—
NHL totals			55	2	9	11	17	—	—	—	—	—

== Awards and honors ==
Award	Year	Ref
AHL
Calder Cup Champion	2025	
