= Linus Karlsson =

Linus Karlsson may refer to:

- Linus Karlsson (table tennis)
- Linus Karlsson (ice hockey)
