= Phillip Di Giuseppe =

Canadian ice hockey player (born 1993)

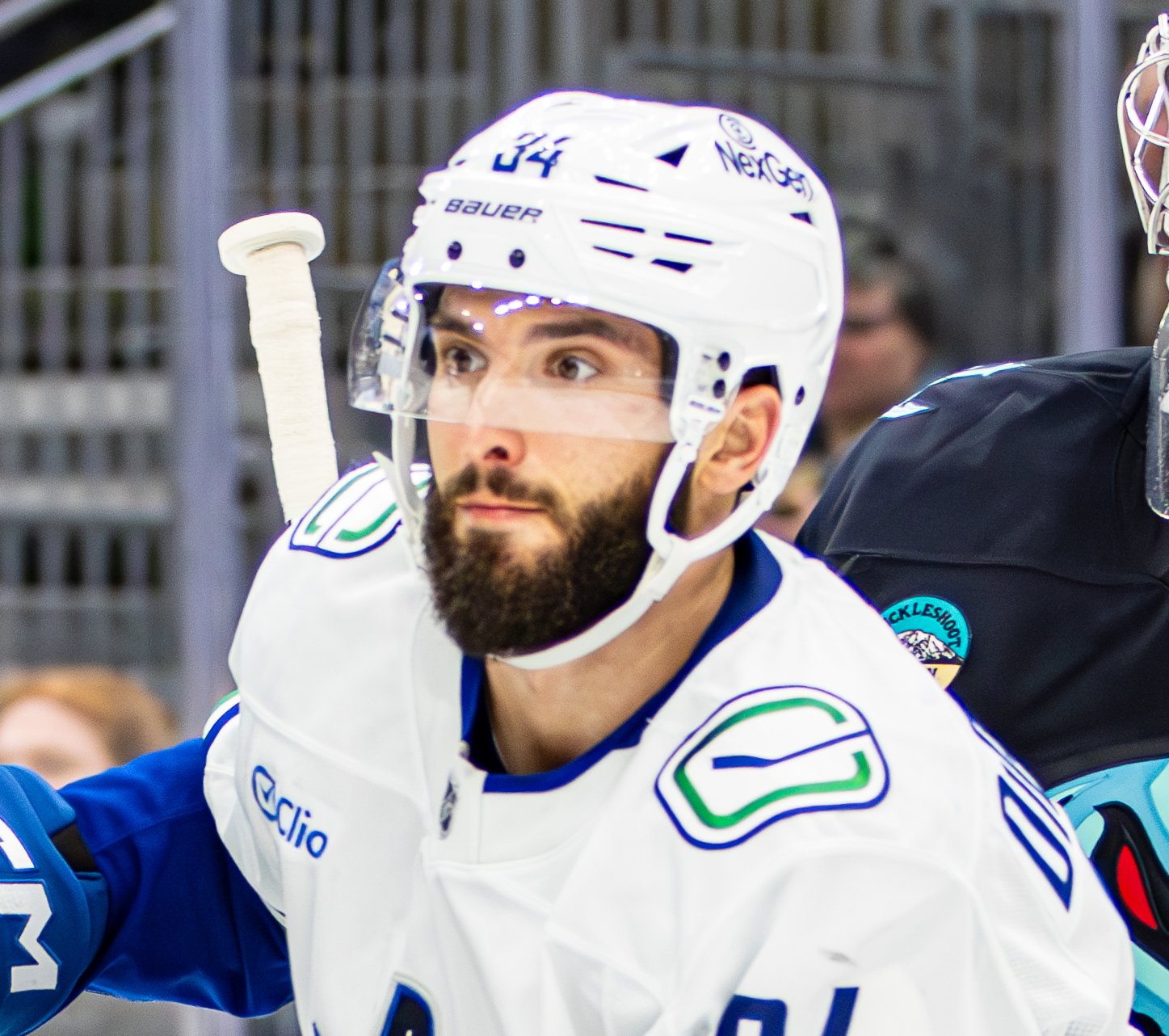
- Di Giuseppe with the Vancouver Canucks in 2025
- Born: October 9, 1993 (age 32) Maple, Ontario, Canada
- Height: 6 ft 0 in (183 cm)
- Weight: 192 lb (87 kg; 13 st 10 lb)
- Position: Left wing
- Shoots: Left
- SHL team Former teams: IF Björklöven; Carolina Hurricanes; Nashville Predators; New York Rangers; Vancouver Canucks
- NHL draft: 38th overall, 2012; Carolina Hurricanes
- Playing career: 2014–present

Phillip Di Giuseppe (born October 9, 1993) is a Canadian professional ice hockey forward for IF Björklöven in the Swedish Hockey League (SHL). He was drafted 38th overall by the Carolina Hurricanes in the 2012 NHL entry draft.

== Early life ==
Di Giuseppe was born on October 9, 1993, in Maple, Ontario to parents Luciano and Cathy. His father works as a general contractor while his mother works in finance. He began playing hockey when he was 7.

== Playing career ==
=== Amateur ===
Growing up in Ontario, Di Giuseppe played his amateur hockey with the Vaughan Kings in the Greater Toronto Hockey League and the Villanova Knights in the Ontario Junior Hockey League (OJHL). During the 2009–10 season with the Knights, he accumulated 16 goals and 31 assists through 56 games. At the conclusion of the season, Di Giuseppe was drafted in the 6th round of the 2009 Ontario Hockey League Draft by the Niagara IceDogs. Despite being drafted, Di Giuseppe chose to play in the OJHL for the 2010–11 season where he broke out with 24 goals and 39 assists for 63 points. He continued his offensive prowess in the 2011 OJHL playoffs by tallying six goals and 10 assists through 10 games. Following the 2010–11 OJHL season, Di Giuseppe was selected for the South-East Conference All-Prospects Second Team.

=== Collegiate ===
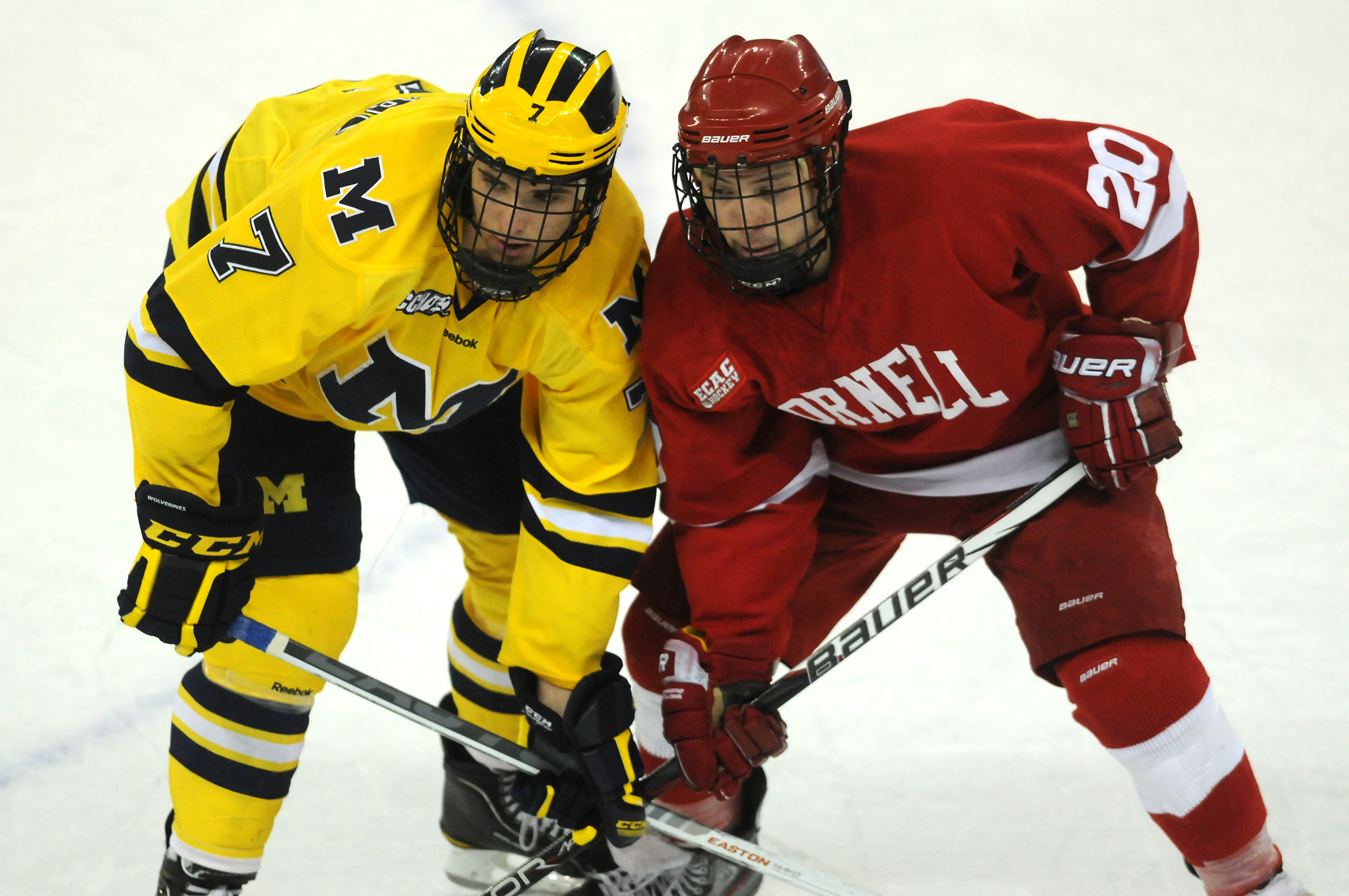
Di Giuseppe (left) with the Wolverines in March 2012.

While playing with the Knights, Di Giuseppe committed to play collegiate hockey with the University of Michigan of the Central Collegiate Hockey Association (CCHA) during their 2011–12 season. He played three seasons with the Michigan Wolverines from 2011 to 2014 while enrolled in the College of Literature, Science, and the Arts. Di Giuseppe immediately made an impact on the Wolverine's lineup while playing alongside Chris Brown and A.J. Treais. He scored his first and second NCAA goals on October 8 during the Wolverine's 4–1 win over the Bentley Falcons. By the end of October, Di Giuseppe's line had combined for 28 points and he was recognized as the CCCHA's Rookie of the Month for October and Rookie of the Week for the week ending on October 31. At the same time, Di Giuseppe's OHL playing rights were traded to the Windsor Spitfires alongside Jaroslav Pavelka and various draft picks in exchange for Tom Kühnhackl and Windsor’s second-round pick in the CHL Import Draft in 2013. Shortly following this trade, Di Giuseppe was invited to audition for Team Canada's National Junior Team ahead of the 2012 World Junior Ice Hockey Championships. By the end of November, Di Giuseppe led the team with seven goals over 16 games and was one of two NCAA freshman named to the NHL Central Scouting Bureau's preliminary "Ones to Watch" list. He was also ranked 28th amongst all draft eligible North American skaters in the Scouting Bureau's mid-term rankings. However, Di Giuseppe began to struggle offensively during the second half of the season and he went six games without a point and nearly two months without a goal. He began to pick up points during the Wolverines playoff berth in March and quickly tallied five points over six games. Di Giuseppe finished his freshman season with 26 points to rank second among team rookies in scoring. Following his freshman season, Di Giuseppe was selected in the second round by the Carolina Hurricanes in the 2012 NHL entry draft.

Di Giuseppe returned to Michigan for his sophomore season in 2012–13, where he gained a new linemate in Luke Moffatt. His former linemate Chris Brown had left Michigan after signing an entry-level deal with the Phoenix Coyotes organization. However, Di Giuseppe struggled to match his freshman production level and gained new linemates in Boo Nieves and Kevin Lynch in February. The trio immediately developed chemistry together and Di Giuseppe quickly tied Nieves for the team lead in assists with 14. While playing alongside his new linemates, Di Giuseppe began to focusing more on passing than scoring. Although he had only accumulated eight goals by the end of February, he matched his previous seasons assist total with 15. Di Giuseppe finished his sophomore season with nine goals and a career best 19 assists for 28 points through 40 games. At the conclusion his sophomore season, Di Giuseppe was invited to participate in the Hurricanes' 2013 Development Camp.

Following the Development Camp, Di Giuseppe returned to Michigan for his junior season in 2013–14. After the team maintained a 6–1–1 record, Di Giuseppe gained new linemates in Andrew Copp and Tyler Motte. Motte was later replaced with Boo Nieves and the trio immediately developed chemistry from their first game together. Despite this, the Wolverines were eliminated from playoff contention on March 20, 2014. Di Giuseppe finished his junior year fifth on the Wolverines in scoring with 13 goals and 11 assists for 24 points.

=== Carolina Hurricanes ===
Having played 115 games with the Wolverines, Di Giuseppe opted to forgo his final year of eligibility, signing a three-year, entry-level contract with the Hurricanes on March 26, 2014. He was signed to an amateur try-out contract by the Hurricanes' American Hockey League (AHL) affiliate, the Charlotte Checkers, recording one assist in three games to conclude 2013–14 regular season.

Di Giuseppe began the 2015–16 season with the Checkers. On December 4, 2015, Di Giuseppe received his first NHL recall by the Hurricanes. The following day he made his NHL debut in a 3-2 victory over the Montreal Canadiens.

On July 27, 2017, the Hurricanes re-signed Di Giuseppe to a one-year, two-way contract worth $725,000.

=== Nashville Predators ===
On January 1, 2019, Di Giuseppe was claimed on waivers by the Nashville Predators. He appeared in three games for the Predators, while also playing in 24 games for their AHL affiliate, the Milwaukee Admirals.

=== New York Rangers ===
On July 18, 2019, as a free agent, Di Giuseppe signed a one-year, two-way contract with the New York Rangers. By December 2019, Di Giuseppe led the Hartford Wolf Pack with six goals and seven assists for 13 points through 25 games. He also led the team in shots on goal and was tied for the team lead in plus/minus rating. He finished the shortened 2019–20 season with one goal and three assists through 20 games with the Rangers while also averaging 9.70 shots on goal per 60 minutes of ice time at 5-on-5. Prior to the start of the 2020–21 season, Di Giuseppe signed a contract extension to remain with the Rangers on October 13.

=== Vancouver Canucks ===
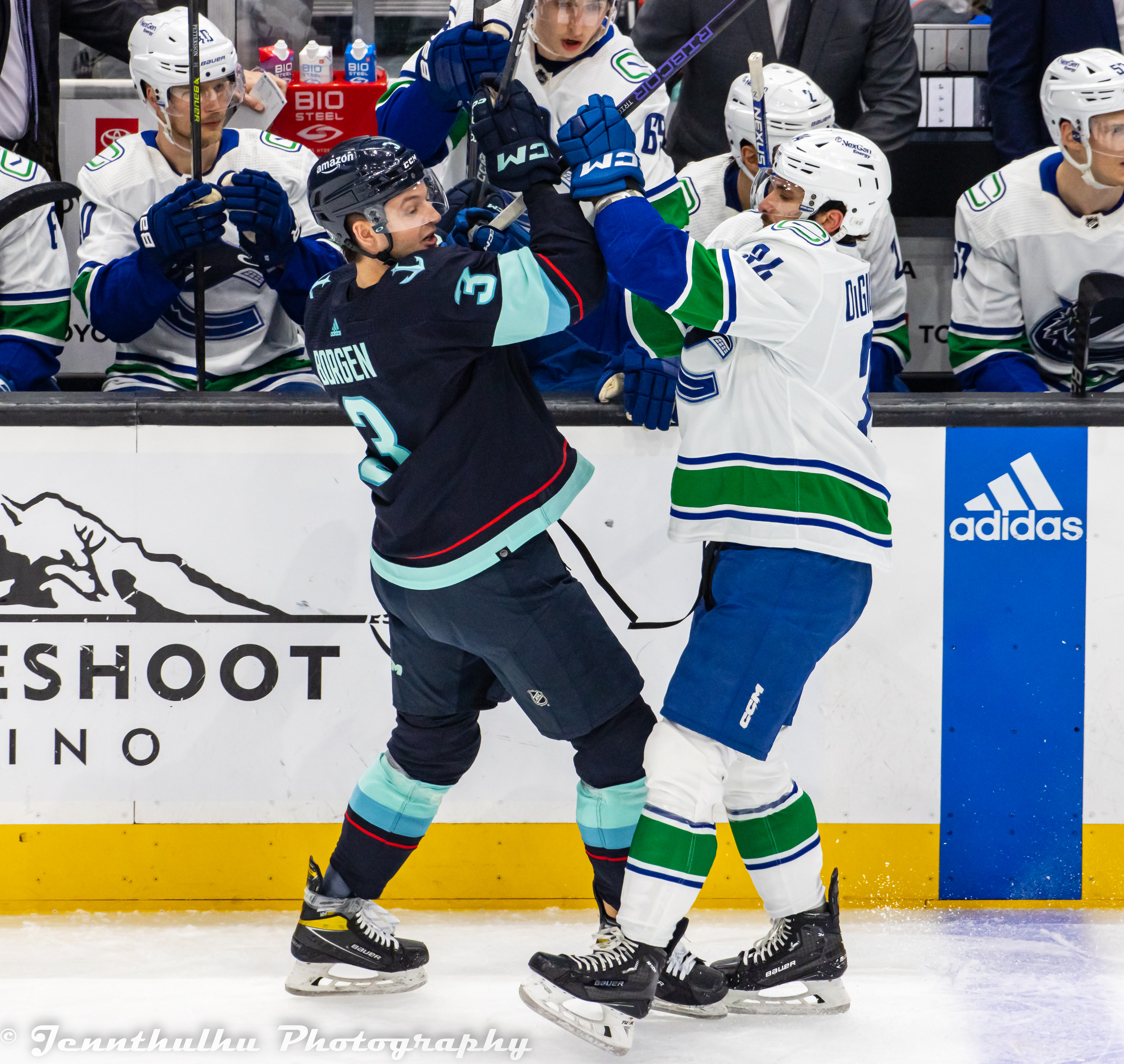
Di Giuseppe (right) during a game against the Seattle Kraken in January 2023.

On July 28, 2021, Di Giuseppe signed a one-year, two-way contract extension with the Vancouver Canucks. After attending the Canucks' Development Camp ahead of the 2021–22 season, Di Giuseppe was re-assigned to their AHL affiliate, the Abbotsford Canucks. He was recalled to the NHL level on December 14 after Luke Schenn and Juho Lammikko were placed in COVID-19 Protocol. However, he tested positive for COVID while the team was in California and was unable to play during his recall. He was eventually activated off the NHL's COVID-19 protocol and was re-assigned to the AHL on January 13. Di Giuseppe was called up again later in February to assist their depleted lineup on their Eastern North America road trip. At the time of the recall, he had accumulated 11 goals and 21 assists through 35 games for Abbotsford. Di Giuseppe finished the 2021–22 season with the Abbotsford Canucks in the AHL, ranking sixth on the team in scoring. He also set new career-highs with 24 assists and 36 points and ranked third on the team in shots. On July 13, 2022, Di Giuseppe signed another one-year, two-way contract extension.

Ahead of the 2022–23 season, head coach Bruce Boudreau announced that Di Giuseppe had suffered a lower-body injury and was expected to need two to four weeks to recover. He was eventually placed on waivers for the purpose of assignment to Abbotsford on October 19. In the later half of the season, Di Giuseppe alternated between the NHL and AHL on numerous occasions. On March 12, 2023, Di Giuseppe signed a two-year two-way contract extension with the Canucks.

On 23 June 2025, Di Giuseppe won the Calder Cup as a member of the Abbotsford Canucks.

=== Winnipeg Jets ===
After four seasons within the Canucks organization, Di Giuseppe left as a free agent and was signed to a one-year, two-way contract with the Winnipeg Jets for the 2025–26 season on July 2, 2025. He was assigned to AHL affiliate, the Manitoba Moose, for the duration of his contract with the Jets, posting 15 goals and 35 points through 72 regular season games.

=== IF Björklöven ===
As a free agent following 12 professional seasons in North America, Di Giuseppe opted to sign his first abroad in agreeing to a one-year deal with newly promoted Swedish club, IF Björklöven of the SHL, on July 16, 2026.

== Career statistics ==
			Regular season					Playoffs
Season	Team	League	GP	G	A	Pts	PIM	GP	G	A	Pts	PIM
2009–10	Villanova Knights	OJHL	56	16	31	47	44	6	1	3	4	0
2010–11	Villanova Knights	OJHL	49	24	39	63	25	10	6	10	16	6
2011–12	Michigan Wolverines	CCHA	40	11	15	26	18	—	—	—	—	—
2012–13	Michigan Wolverines	CCHA	40	9	19	28	32	—	—	—	—	—
2013–14	Michigan Wolverines	B1G	35	13	11	24	29	—	—	—	—	—
2013–14	Charlotte Checkers	AHL	3	0	1	1	6	—	—	—	—	—
2014–15	Charlotte Checkers	AHL	76	11	19	30	20	—	—	—	—	—
2015–16	Charlotte Checkers	AHL	25	8	10	18	12	—	—	—	—	—
2015–16	Carolina Hurricanes	NHL	41	7	10	17	18	—	—	—	—	—
2016–17	Carolina Hurricanes	NHL	36	1	6	7	15	—	—	—	—	—
2016–17	Charlotte Checkers	AHL	40	12	16	28	22	5	1	0	1	4
2017–18	Charlotte Checkers	AHL	14	4	8	12	8	—	—	—	—	—
2017–18	Carolina Hurricanes	NHL	49	5	8	13	17	—	—	—	—	—
2018–19	Carolina Hurricanes	NHL	21	1	3	4	8	—	—	—	—	—
2018–19	Charlotte Checkers	AHL	2	0	0	0	19	—	—	—	—	—
2018–19	Nashville Predators	NHL	3	0	0	0	0	—	—	—	—	—
2018–19	Milwaukee Admirals	AHL	24	5	7	12	6	5	2	0	2	4
2019–20	Hartford Wolf Pack	AHL	43	14	12	26	39	—	—	—	—	—
2019–20	New York Rangers	NHL	20	1	3	4	2	3	0	0	0	0
2020–21	New York Rangers	NHL	31	1	7	8	13	—	—	—	—	—
2021–22	Abbotsford Canucks	AHL	42	12	24	36	37	2	0	0	0	0
2022–23	Abbotsford Canucks	AHL	37	13	19	32	29	—	—	—	—	—
2022–23	Vancouver Canucks	NHL	30	6	6	12	14	—	—	—	—	—
2023–24	Vancouver Canucks	NHL	51	5	5	10	36	11	1	1	2	2
2024–25	Abbotsford Canucks	AHL	22	4	5	9	10	24	6	5	11	14
2024–25	Vancouver Canucks	NHL	20	1	5	6	4	—	—	—	—	—
2025–26	Manitoba Moose	AHL	72	15	20	35	74	7	1	1	2	18
NHL totals			302	28	53	81	127	14	1	1	2	2

== Awards and honours ==
Award	Year	Ref
AHL
Calder Cup Champion	2025	
