= Linus Karlsson (ice hockey) =

Swedish ice hockey player (born 1999)

- Born: 16 November 1999 (age 26) Landsbro, Sweden
- Height: 6 ft 1 in (185 cm)
- Weight: 179 lb (81 kg; 12 st 11 lb)
- Position: Centre
- Shoots: Right
- NHL team Former teams: Vancouver Canucks; Karlskrona HK; Skellefteå AIK
- National team: Sweden
- NHL draft: 87th overall, 2018; San Jose Sharks
- Playing career: 2018–present

Linus Karlsson (born 16 November 1999) is a Swedish professional ice hockey player who is a centre and alternate captain for the Vancouver Canucks of the National Hockey League (NHL). Karlsson was selected in the third round, 87th overall, of the 2018 NHL entry draft by the San Jose Sharks.

== Playing career ==
Karlsson began playing with the Boro/Vetlanda club at different junior levels before he started playing at the senior level (in the fourth tier of Swedish ice hockey) during the 2015–16 season. Karlsson signed with the Karlskrona HK organization for the 2017–18 season, and subsequently made his Swedish Hockey League debut with Karlskrona during the 2017–18 season. On 25 February 2019, his NHL rights were traded to the Vancouver Canucks in exchange for Jonathan Dahlén. after a successful 2021–22 season with Skellefteå AIK he was awarded the SHL Rookie of the Year award.

On 27 May 2022, Karlsson was signed to a two-year, entry-level contract with the Vancouver Canucks. He made his NHL debut on 16 November 2023, in a 5–2 loss to the Calgary Flames, recording three shots in 11:54 of ice time. Karlsson scored his first point and goal in the NHL on 29 January 2025 against the Nashville Predators, where the Canucks won 3–1 and Karlsson's goal became the game-winning goal. In March 2025, Karlsson signed a one year extension with the Canucks.

On June 23, 2025, Karlsson captured the Calder Cup as part of the Abbotsford Canucks roster. He finished the 2025 Calder Cup playoffs as the top scorer, leading all players with 14 goals and 26 points.

== Career statistics ==
Bold indicates led league

			Regular season					Playoffs
Season	Team	League	GP	G	A	Pts	PIM	GP	G	A	Pts	PIM
2015–16	Boro/Vetlanda HC	Div.2	20	4	3	7	2	—	—	—	—	—
2016–17	Boro/Vetlanda HC	Div.2	31	21	23	44	32	—	—	—	—	—
2017–18	Karlskrona HK	J20	42	27	25	52	26	6	2	2	4	10
2017–18	Karlskrona HK	SHL	13	0	1	1	2	—	—	—	—	—
2018–19	Karlskrona HK	J20	1	0	2	2	0	4	2	3	5	0
2018–19	Karlskrona HK	Allsv	52	5	13	18	59	5	1	0	1	4
2019–20	Karlskrona HK	Allsv	36	8	14	22	18	—	—	—	—	—
2019–20	BIK Karlskoga	Allsv	12	6	12	18	0	1	2	0	2	0
2020–21	BIK Karlskoga	Allsv	52	20	31	51	32	11	8	7	15	2
2021–22	Skellefteå AIK	SHL	52	26	20	46	18	6	0	1	1	6
2022–23	Abbotsford Canucks	AHL	72	24	25	49	72	6	1	1	2	6
2023–24	Abbotsford Canucks	AHL	60	23	37	60	30	6	2	0	2	10
2023–24	Vancouver Canucks	NHL	4	0	0	0	0	2	0	0	0	2
2024–25	Abbotsford Canucks	AHL	32	23	16	39	24	24	**14**	12	**26**	28
2024–25	Vancouver Canucks	NHL	23	3	3	6	6	—	—	—	—	—
2025–26	Vancouver Canucks	NHL	79	15	20	35	42	—	—	—	—	—
SHL totals			65	26	21	47	20	6	0	1	1	6
NHL totals			106	18	23	41	48	2	0	0	0	2

=== International ===
Year	Team	Event	Result	GP	G	A	Pts	PIM
2026	Sweden	WC	7th	8	2	3	5	6
Senior totals				8	2	3	5	6

== Awards and honours ==
Award	Year	Ref
AHL
Calder Cup champion	2025	

Awards and achievements
Preceded by William Eklund	Winner of the SHL Rookie of the Year award 2022	Succeeded by Filip Bystedt
