= Bogdan Trineyev =

Russian ice hockey player (born 2002)

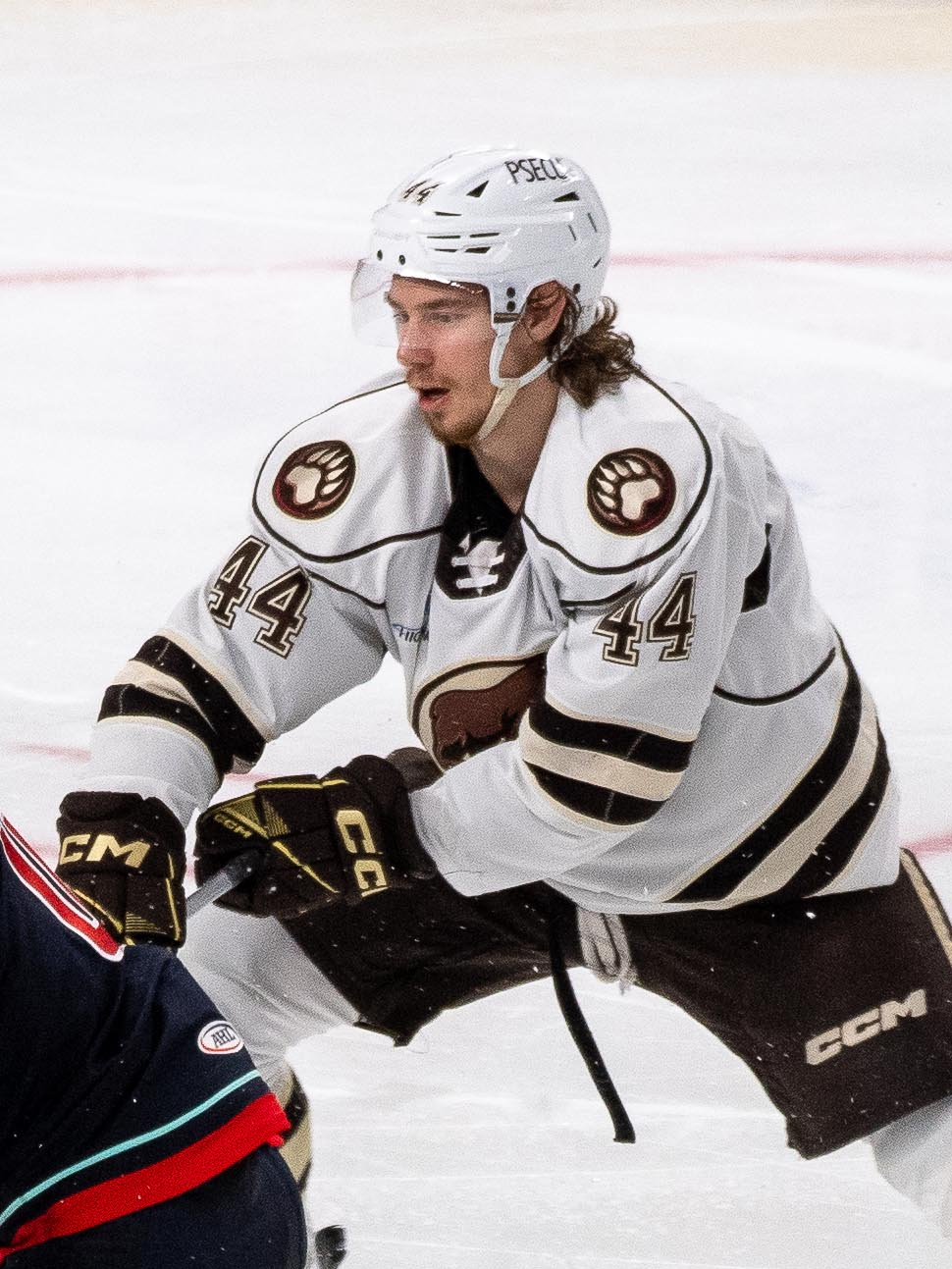
- Trineyev in 2024
- Born: March 4, 2002 (age 24) Voronezh, Voronezh Oblast, Russia
- Height: 6 ft 3 in (191 cm)
- Weight: 198 lb (90 kg; 14 st 2 lb)
- Position: Right wing
- Shoots: Right
- NHL team (P) Cur. team Former teams: Washington Capitals; Hershey Bears (AHL); HC Dynamo Moscow
- NHL draft: 117th overall, 2020; Washington Capitals
- Playing career: 2020–present

Bogdan Aleksandrovich Trineyev (Русский: Богдан Александрович Тринеев; born 4 March 2002) is a Russian professional ice hockey right wing for the Hershey Bears in the American Hockey League (AHL) as a prospect under contract to the Washington Capitals of the National Hockey League (NHL).

== Playing career ==
Trineyev played as a youth within HC Dynamo Moscow organization, appearing in the MHL with MHC Dynamo Moscow. He made his professional debut in the Supreme Hockey League (VHL) with affiliate, Dynamo Tver in 2020, before he was selected in the fourth round, 117th overall, by the Washington Capitals in the 2020 NHL entry draft.

He made his Kontinental Hockey League (KHL) debut the following season in 2020–21 with Dynamo Moscow, going scoreless in three appearances. Trineyev recorded 30 points in 33 games and nine points in 14 playoff games with MHK Dynamo Moscow, winning the MHL Championship.

On 2 May 2022, Trineyev was signed by the Capitals to a three-year, entry-level contract.

== Career statistics ==
=== Regular season and playoffs ===
			Regular season					Playoffs
Season	Team	League	GP	G	A	Pts	PIM	GP	G	A	Pts	PIM
2018–19	MHC Dynamo Moscow	MHL	23	1	8	9	20	—	—	—	—	—
2019–20	MHC Dynamo Moscow	MHL	36	12	14	26	8	2	0	0	0	0
2019–20	Dynamo Tver	VHL	1	0	0	0	0	—	—	—	—	—
2020–21	MHC Dynamo Moscow	MHL	33	15	15	30	16	14	3	6	9	4
2020–21	Dynamo Krasnogorsk	VHL	22	1	1	2	27	—	—	—	—	—
2020–21	Dynamo Moscow	KHL	3	0	0	0	2	—	—	—	—	—
2021–22	Dynamo Moscow	KHL	11	0	0	0	4	9	0	1	1	0
2021–22	MHC Dynamo Moscow	MHL	21	3	15	18	4	1	0	1	1	4
2021–22	Hershey Bears	AHL	—	—	—	—	—	2	0	0	0	0
2022–23	Dynamo Moscow	KHL	39	2	11	13	12	5	0	2	2	4
2022–23	HC Dynamo St. Petersburg	VHL	2	0	0	0	0	—	—	—	—	—
2022–23	Hershey Bears	AHL	2	0	0	0	0	—	—	—	—	—
2023–24	Hershey Bears	AHL	63	9	7	16	18	20	0	4	4	6
2024–25	Hershey Bears	AHL	62	14	8	22	23	8	5	2	7	6
2025–26	Hershey Bears	AHL	62	17	28	45	31	6	3	3	6	8
2025–26	Washington Capitals	NHL	2	0	0	0	0	—	—	—	—	—
KHL totals			53	2	11	13	18	14	0	3	3	4
NHL totals			2	0	0	0	0	—	—	—	—	—

=== International ===
Year	Team	Event	Result	GP	G	A	Pts	PIM
2019	Russia	HG18	1st place, gold medalist(s)	4	2	2	4	2
Junior totals				4	2	2	4	2

== Awards and honours ==
Award	Year
AHL
Calder Cup	2024
