= Abbotsford Canucks =

American Hockey League team in Abbotsford, British Columbia

- City: Abbotsford, British Columbia
- League: American Hockey League
- Conference: Western
- Division: Pacific
- Founded: 1932
- Home arena: Rogers Forum
- Colours: Field green, Pacific blue, Fraser blue, valley fog grey, mountain white
- Owner: Canucks Sports & Entertainment
- General manager: Richard Seeley
- Head coach: Ryan Papaioannou
- Captain: Chase Wouters
- Affiliates: Vancouver Canucks (NHL); Kalamazoo Wings (ECHL)
- Website: abbotsford.canucks.com

Franchise history
- 1932–1935: Quebec Beavers
- 1935–1951: Springfield Indians
- 1951–1954: Syracuse Warriors
- 1954–1967: Springfield Indians
- 1967–1974: Springfield Kings
- 1974–1994: Springfield Indians
- 1994–2005: Worcester IceCats
- 2005–2013: Peoria Rivermen
- 2013–2021: Utica Comets
- 2021–present: Abbotsford Canucks

Championships
- Division titles: 0
- Conference titles: 1 (2024–25)
- Calder Cups: 1 (2024–25)

The Abbotsford Canucks are a professional ice hockey team based in Abbotsford, British Columbia. The team began play in the 2021–22 season with home games at Rogers Forum as the American Hockey League (AHL) affiliate of the National Hockey League's Vancouver Canucks. The team is a relocation of the franchise owned by the Canucks and known as the Utica Comets from 2013 to 2021. This is the second AHL team to play in Abbotsford after the Calgary Flames affiliate Abbotsford Heat from 2009 until 2014.

== History ==
The franchise that became the Abbotsford Canucks was founded in Quebec City in 1932 as the Quebec Beavers. In 1935, the franchise moved to Springfield and became the Indians, reviving the name after the original Indians franchise ceased operations during the 1932–33 Canadian-American Hockey League season. In addition to the Indians, the team has been known as the Syracuse Warriors, Springfield Kings, Worcester IceCats, Peoria Rivermen, and Utica Comets.

On March 29, 2013, Canucks Sports & Entertainment (CS&E), owners of the National Hockey League's (NHL) Vancouver Canucks, was announced as purchasing the American Hockey League (AHL) franchise then playing as the Peoria Rivermen. The purchase was approved by the league on April 18. After purchasing the franchise, CS&E intended to have the franchise located in a market close to Vancouver with their initial preference as Abbotsford, which at the time was home to the Calgary Flames AHL farm club, the Abbotsford Heat. The Heat had been rumoured to be relocating to Utica, New York, at the time. Negotiations between the Canucks and Abbotsford broke down by April 22 and the Heat remained in the city.

After exploring options for having the team in Vancouver, Seattle, and Peoria, CS&E came to a six-year operating agreement with Robert Esche to place the franchise in Utica and the city's soon-to-be-renovated Memorial Auditorium as the Utica Comets. The Comets began play in the 2013–14 AHL season. The Heat lasted only one more season in Abbotsford before relocating to Glens Falls, New York, as the Adirondack Flames in 2014. Before the 2019–20 season, CS&E and Esche's operating contract was extended for up to an additional six years, with potential opt outs every two seasons.

On July 14, 2021, the name, logo, and colours for the Abbotsford Canucks were released. The Vancouver Canucks transferred both former Comets general manager Ryan Johnson and head coach Trent Cull to Abbotsford.

On June 8, 2025, the Abbotsford Canucks advanced to the Calder Cup final for the first time in franchise history after defeating the Texas Stars in 6 games. This marked the fourth appearance of the Vancouver Canucks' AHL affiliate in the final round joining the 1987-88 Fredericton Express (shared affiliation with the Quebec Nordiques), 2008-09 Manitoba Moose, and 2014-15 Utica Comets. On June 23, the franchise won its first Calder Cup by defeating the Charlotte Checkers in 6 games becoming the first franchise from the AHL's Pacific Division, the first Western Canadian team, and the first Vancouver Canucks AHL affiliate to win the Calder Cup. The following season, during the 2025-26 campaign, the Canucks failed to defend their championship title by being formally eliminated from playoff contention following a series loss to the San Jose Barracuda on March 22, 2026 and ultimately finishing the season 9th place in the Pacific Division above the last place Calgary Wranglers.

Although the Canucks do not formally acknowledge their pre-2021 legacy (or claim the Indians' seven Calder Cups), the franchise has iced a team in one form or another for all but seven seasons since 1932 in the CAHL (all but three not counting wartime or pandemic years). The Canucks and Hartford Wolf Pack—heirs to another charter AHL member, the Providence Reds—are the oldest minor-league hockey franchises in North America, and are the lsst surviving members of the original "circuit of mutual convenience" from 1936 that became the AHL. Among all professional hockey franchises, only the NHL's Original Six teams and the Wolf Pack are older than the Canucks.

== Season-by-season records ==
| Regular season | | | | | | | | | | | Playoffs | | | | | |
| Season | GP | W | L | OTL | SOL | Pts | PCT | GF | GA | Standing | Year | Prelims | 1st round | 2nd round | 3rd round | Finals |
|---|---|---|---|---|---|---|---|---|---|---|---|---|---|---|---|---|
| 2021–22 | 68 | 39 | 23 | 5 | 1 | 84 | .618 | 230 | 200 | 5th, Pacific | 2022 | L, 0–2, BAK | — | — | — | — |
| 2022–23 | 72 | 40 | 25 | 3 | 4 | 87 | .604 | 229 | 203 | 4th, Pacific | 2023 | W, 2–0, BAK | L, 1–3, CGY | — | — | — |
| 2023–24 | 72 | 40 | 25 | 5 | 2 | 87 | .604 | 234 | 210 | 5th, Pacific | 2024 | W, 2–1, COL | L, 0–3, ONT | — | — | — |
| 2024–25 | 72 | 44 | 24 | 2 | 2 | 92 | .639 | 241 | 204 | 2nd, Pacific | 2025 | W, 2–1, TUC | W, 3–1, CV | W, 3–2, COL | W, 4–2, TEX | W, 4–2, CLT |
| 2025–26 | 72 | 28 | 37 | 4 | 3 | 63 | .438 | 173 | 234 | 9th, Pacific | 2026 | — | — | — | — | — |

== Players ==
=== Current roster ===
Updated November 10, 2026.

| No. | Nat | Player | Pos | S/G | Age | Acquired | Birthplace | Contract |
|---|---|---|---|---|---|---|---|---|
| 46 | (Sweden) | Vilmer Alriksson | LW | L | 21 | 2025 | Enebyberg, Sweden | Vancouver |
| 3 | (Canada) | Joe Arntsen | D | L | 23 | 2024 | Swift Current, Saskatchewan | Abbotsford |
| 79 | (Canada) | Ben Berard | LW | L | 27 | 2024 | Duncan, British Columbia | Abbotsford |
| 53 | (Canada) | Isaac Belliveau | D | L | 23 | 2026 | Fleurimont, Quebec | Abbotsford |
| 80 | (Canada) | Austin Brimmer | RW | R | 25 | 2026 | Markham, Ontario | Abbotsford |
| 54 | (Canada) | Brandon Buhr | F | R | 24 | 2026 | Burnaby, British Columbia | Vancouver |
| 34 | (Canada) | Cole Clayton | D | R | 26 | 2026 | Strathmore, Alberta | Vancouver |
| 86 | (Canada) | Braeden Cootes | C | R | 19 | 2026 | Sherwood Park, Alberta | Vancouver |
| 64 | (Canada) | Trey Fix-Wolansky | RW | R | 27 | 2026 | Edmonton, Alberta | Vancouver |
| 59 | (Russia) | Kirill Kudryavtsev | D | L | 22 | 2024 | Yaroslavl, Russia | Vancouver |
| 72 | (Canada) | Kole Lind | RW | R | 28 | 2026 | Shaunavon, Saskatchewan | Abbotsford |
| 90 | (United States) | Victor Mancini | D | R | 24 | 2025 | Hancock, Michigan | Vancouver |
| 39 | (Canada) | Ty Mueller (A) | C | L | 23 | 2024 | Cochrane, Alberta | Vancouver |
| 45 | (Canada) | Sawyer Mynio | D | L | 21 | 2024 | Kamloops, British Columbia | Vancouver |
| 68 | (Canada) | Riley Patterson | C | R | 20 | 2026 | Etobicoke, Ontario | Vancouver |
| 26 | (Latvia) | Anri Ravinskis | LW | L | 23 | 2025 | Riga, Latvia | Vancouver |
| 42 | (United States) | Tim Rego | D | R | 26 | 2026 | Mansfield, Massachusetts | Abbotsford |
| 24 | (Russia) | Ilya Safonov | C | L | 25 | 2026 | Murmansk, Russia | Vancouver |
| 52 | (United States) | Bennett Schimek | RW | R | 23 | 2026 | Mendota Heights, Minnesota | Abbotsford |
| 48 | (United States) | Jimmy Schuldt (A) | D | L | 31 | 2025 | Minnetonka, Minnesota | Vancouver |
| 73 | (Canada) | Matt Stienburg | RW | R | 26 | 2026 | Halifax, Nova Scotia | Vancouver |
| 2 | (Canada) | Jack Thompson | D | R | 24 | 2026 | Courtice, Ontario | Vancouver |
| 60 | (Belarus) | Nikita Tolopilo | G | L | 26 | 2023 | Minsk, Belarus | Vancouver |
| 38 | (Canada) | Gavin White | D | R | 24 | 2026 | Brockville, Ontario | Abbotsford |
| 21 | (Canada) | Chase Wouters (C) | C | R | 26 | 2021 | North Battleford, Saskatchewan | Vancouver |
| 85 | (Canada) | Ty Young | G | L | 22 | 2024 | Coaldale, Alberta | Vancouver |

=== Team captains ===
- Chase Wouters, 2022–present

=== Head coaches ===
- Trent Cull, 2021–2022
- Jeremy Colliton, 2022–2024
- Manny Malhotra, 2024–2026
- Ryan Papaioannou, 2026–present

=== Notable alumni ===
The following players have played both 100 games for the Abbotsford Canucks and 100 games in the National Hockey League:

- Phil Di Giuseppe
- Sheldon Dries
