= Rory Kerins =

Canadian ice hockey player (born 2002)

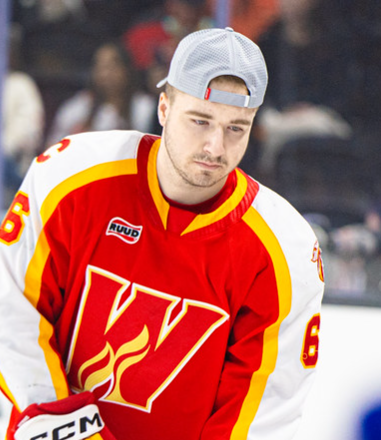
- Kerins in 2025
- Born: April 12, 2002 (age 24) Caledon, Ontario, Canada
- Height: 5 ft 10 in (178 cm)
- Weight: 175 lb (79 kg; 12 st 7 lb)
- Position: Centre
- Shoots: Left
- NHL team (P) Cur. team: Calgary Flames; Calgary Wranglers (AHL)
- NHL draft: 174th overall, 2020; Calgary Flames
- Playing career: 2021–present

Rory Kerins (born April 12, 2002) is a Canadian professional ice hockey forward for the Calgary Wranglers in the American Hockey League (AHL) as a prospect to the Calgary Flames of the National Hockey League (NHL).

== Playing career ==
He made his NHL debut on January 13, 2025 in a regular season match against the Chicago Blackhawks recording 2 assists.

== Career statistics ==
			Regular season					Playoffs
Season	Team	League	GP	G	A	Pts	PIM	GP	G	A	Pts	PIM
2017–18	Mississauga Rebels	GTHL	27	16	10	26	26	—	—	—	—	—
2018–19	Soo Greyhounds	OHL	57	9	14	23	2	10	0	0	0	2
2019–20	Soo Greyhounds	OHL	64	30	29	59	30	—	—	—	—	—
2020–21	Stockton Heat	AHL	4	0	0	0	0	—	—	—	—	—
2021–22	Soo Greyhounds	OHL	67	43	75	118	49	10	1	9	10	6
2021–22	Stockton Heat	AHL	—	—	—	—	—	5	0	0	0	4
2022–23	Rapid City Rush	ECHL	38	17	20	37	8	—	—	—	—	—
2022–23	Calgary Wranglers	AHL	6	1	1	2	0	—	—	—	—	—
2023–24	Calgary Wranglers	AHL	54	16	16	32	8	1	0	0	0	0
2024–25	Calgary Wranglers	AHL	63	33	28	61	18	2	1	0	1	2
2024–25	Calgary Flames	NHL	5	0	4	4	0	—	—	—	—	—
2025–26	Calgary Wranglers	AHL	56	22	35	57	16	—	—	—	—	—
2025–26	Calgary Flames	NHL	4	0	0	0	2	—	—	—	—	—
NHL totals			9	0	4	4	2	—	—	—	—	—
