= Dryden Hunt =

Canadian ice hockey player (born 1995)

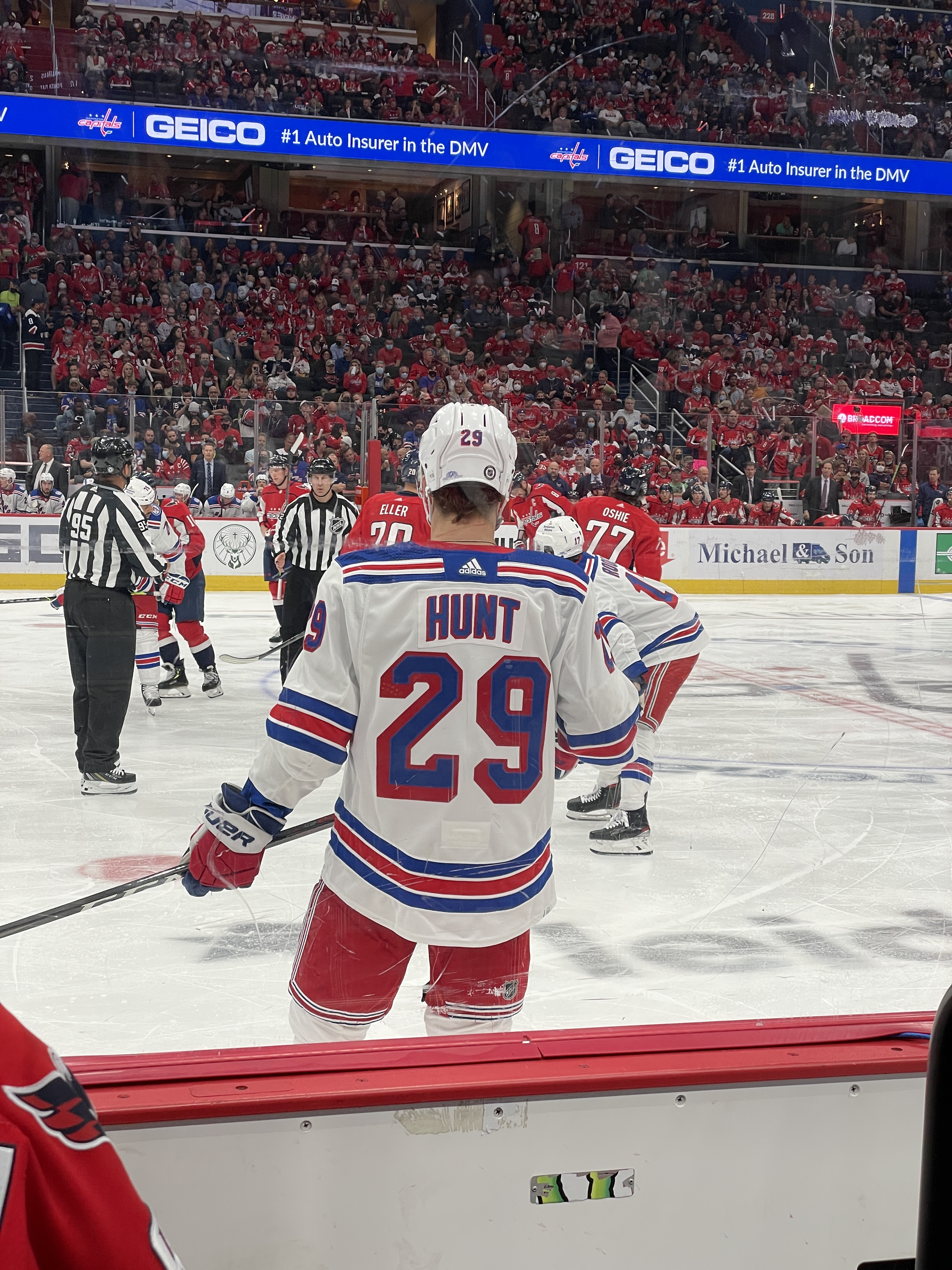
- Hunt with the New York Rangers in 2021
- Born: November 24, 1995 (age 30) Cranbrook, British Columbia, Canada
- Height: 6 ft 0 in (183 cm)
- Weight: 197 lb (89 kg; 14 st 1 lb)
- Position: Left wing
- Shoots: Left
- NHL team (P) Cur. team Former teams: Calgary Flames; Calgary Wranglers (AHL); Florida Panthers; Arizona Coyotes; New York Rangers; Colorado Avalanche; Toronto Maple Leafs
- NHL draft: Undrafted
- Playing career: 2016–present

Dryden Hunt (born November 24, 1995) is a Canadian professional ice hockey left winger for the Calgary Wranglers of the American Hockey League (AHL) while under contract to the Calgary Flames of the National Hockey League (NHL). He has also previously played for the Florida Panthers, Arizona Coyotes, New York Rangers, Colorado Avalanche and Toronto Maple Leafs.

== Playing career ==
=== Junior ===
Hunt played amateur junior hockey firstly with the Notre Dame Argos in the Saskatchewan Midget AAA Hockey League before moving back to his native British Columbia with the Kootenay Ice of the British Columbia Hockey Major Midget League.

Hunt opted to pursue a major junior career in the Western Hockey League (WHL) with the Regina Pats. During his fourth season with the club in 2014–15, Hunt was leading the Pats with 47 points in 37 games before he was traded to the Medicine Hat Tigers on January 5, 2015. He played out the season in contributing 36 points in 34 games.

Undrafted, Hunt opted to play his overage year in the WHL, and was acquired by the Moose Jaw Warriors before the 2015–16 season on September 23, 2015. Hunt continued to improve offensively, leading the Warriors and the League with 58 goals in 72 games. As an alternate captain he completed the regular season with 116 points before suffering a second round exit with 16 points in 10 post-season games. He was selected as the League's Player of the Year and earned a place on the East First All-Star Team.

=== Professional ===
Hunt was signed as a free agent to a three-year, entry-level contract with the Florida Panthers of the National Hockey League (NHL) on March 2, 2016. He spent the majority of the 2016–17 season assigned to the Panthers' American Hockey League (AHL) affiliate, the Springfield Thunderbirds, where he scored 13 goals and 31 points. In February 2017 Hunt was demoted to the Manchester Monarchs of the ECHL. He appeared in two games with Manchester, scoring two goals before returning to Springfield. He was assigned to Springfield to start the following 2017–18 season. After 13 games on November 9, 2017, he received his first recall to the Panthers. He made his NHL debut with the Panthers in a 4–1 victory over the Buffalo Sabres on November 10, 2017. He registered his first NHL point, assisting on Jared McCann's game winning goal in the third period of 3–2 victory over the New Jersey Devils on November 27. After 11 games, in which he had just the one assist, he was returned to Springfield. He finished the season with Springfield scoring 23 goals and 46 goals in 58 games.

He began the 2018–19 season with the Thunderbirds, but was recalled by Florida for the first time on November 19. He made his NHL season debut against the Ottawa Senators in a 7–5 victory in which he earned his first NHL point of the season assisting on Jared McCann's first period goal. He scored his first NHL goal against goaltender Jimmy Howard on March 10 in a 6–1 victory over the Detroit Red Wings. He finished the season with 51 games played for Springfield, marking 23 goals and 41 points and 31 games for the Panthers, scoring three goals and ten points. In the offseason, Hunt was a restricted free agent but was extended a qualifying offer.

Hunt made the Panthers roster out of training camp to begin the 2019–20 season. However, in November, after playing in 20 games, registering only four assists, he was placed on waivers. After going unclaimed, he was assigned to the AHL. He appeared in 35 games with Springfield, scoring 13 goals and 29 points. He was recalled in February 2020 and played in one more game with Florida, suffering a lower-body injury in the game, before the NHL suspended the season due to the COVID-19 pandemic on March 12. When play resumed for the 2020 Stanley Cup playoffs, Hunt made his playoff debut in a best-of-five qualifying round versus the New York Islanders, appearing in two games.

After his fourth season within the Panthers organization, Hunt as an impending restricted free agent was not tendered a qualifying offer by Florida, releasing him as an unrestricted free agent. On October 10, 2020, Hunt was signed to a one-year, two-way contract with the Arizona Coyotes. In the pandemic-shortened 2020–21 season, Hunt remained on the Coyotes taxi squad and after his elevation in the roster and initially serving as a healthy scratch he made his debut for the Coyotes in a 4–3 defeat to the St. Louis Blues on February 2, 2021. He scored his first goal with Arizona against Ville Husso in a 5–4 loss to the St. Louis Blues on February 13. Adding a physical presence when inserted into the lineup, Hunt posted three goals and eight points through 26 games as the Coyotes missed the post-season.

On July 28, 2021, Hunt signed as a free agent to a two-year deal with the New York Rangers. In the 2021–22 season, Hunt made his Rangers debut on season opening night, featuring on the fourth line in a 5–1 defeat to the Washington Capitals on October 13, 2021. He made his 100th NHL appearance on November 5, 2021, in a 6–5 overtime defeat to the Edmonton Oilers before registering his first goal with the Rangers in a 2–1 defeat to the Toronto Maple Leafs on November 18, 2021. While one of the Rangers leaders in hits, Hunt was elevated in the line-up through the season and recorded a career-high three assists on March 12, 2022, in a 7–4 victory over the Dallas Stars. He finished the regular season finishing with career highs of 76 games for 6 goals, 11 assists and 17 points. He went scoreless in three playoff appearances as the Rangers reached the Eastern Conference finals.

In his final season under contract with the Rangers, Hunt began the 2022–23 season by scoring one goal in three games before he was placed on waivers on October 19, 2022. He was claimed the following day by defending champions, the Colorado Avalanche, on October 20, 2022. He made his debut on the fourth line with the Avalanche in a 3–2 defeat to the Seattle Kraken on October 21, 2022. He registered his first point and goal with the Avalanche, in his 15th appearance, helping Colorado to a 4–1 win over Dallas Stars on November 26, 2022.

After 25 appearances with the Avalanche, having registered a lone goal, Hunt was again on the move after he was traded to the Toronto Maple Leafs in exchange for Denis Malgin on December 19, 2022. He scored his first goal for Toronto against the Florida Panthers on January 17, 2023. Hunt made nine appearances with the Maple Leafs before he was waived and re-assigned to AHL affiliate, the Toronto Marlies on January 23. He played in 15 games with the Marlies, scoring four goals and nine points.

On March 3, 2023, the Maple Leafs traded Hunt to the Calgary Flames in exchange for forward Radim Zohorna. He was directly re-assigned to continue in the AHL with the Flames affiliate, the Calgary Wranglers, for the remainder of the season. As a free agent, Hunt opted to re-sign with Calgary in agreeing to a two-year, two-way contract on July 2. Hunt made the Flames roster out of training camp to begin the 2023–24 season, but after going pointless in four games, was placed on waivers on November 7. After going unclaimed, Hunt was assigned to the Wranglers. He was recalled on February 16, 2024. He scored his first goal with the Flames on February 24 against Stuart Skinner in a 6–3 victory over the Edmonton Oilers. He finished the season with the Flames, appearing in 28 games, scoring three goals and eight points. He also put up seven goals and 22 points in 23 games with the Wranglers.

After clearing waivers, Hunt was assigned to the Wranglers for the 2023–24 season.

== Career statistics ==
| | | | Regular season | | | | | Playoffs |
| Season | Team | League | GP | G | A | Pts | PIM | GP | G | A | Pts | PIM |
|---|---|---|---|---|---|---|---|---|---|---|---|---|
| 2009–10 | Notre Dame Argos | SMHL | 4 | 0 | 1 | 1 | 2 | — | — | — | — | — |
| 2010–11 | Kootenay Ice | BCMML | 40 | 19 | 28 | 47 | 84 | — | — | — | — | — |
| 2010–11 | Trail Smoke Eaters | BCHL | 4 | 0 | 0 | 0 | 0 | — | — | — | — | — |
| 2011–12 | Regina Pats | WHL | 62 | 5 | 5 | 10 | 28 | 3 | 0 | 0 | 0 | 2 |
| 2012–13 | Regina Pats | WHL | 2 | 0 | 0 | 0 | 0 | — | — | — | — | — |
| 2013–14 | Regina Pats | WHL | 62 | 21 | 19 | 40 | 64 | 4 | 4 | 1 | 5 | 4 |
| 2014–15 | Regina Pats | WHL | 37 | 14 | 33 | 47 | 32 | — | — | — | — | — |
| 2014–15 | Medicine Hat Tigers | WHL | 34 | 19 | 17 | 36 | 18 | 10 | 5 | 2 | 7 | 6 |
| 2015–16 | Moose Jaw Warriors | WHL | 72 | 58 | 58 | 116 | 48 | 10 | 7 | 9 | 16 | 8 |
| 2016–17 | Springfield Thunderbirds | AHL | 70 | 13 | 18 | 31 | 65 | — | — | — | — | — |
| 2016–17 | Manchester Monarchs | ECHL | 2 | 2 | 0 | 2 | 0 | — | — | — | — | — |
| 2017–18 | Springfield Thunderbirds | AHL | 58 | 23 | 23 | 46 | 37 | — | — | — | — | — |
| 2017–18 | Florida Panthers | NHL | 11 | 0 | 1 | 1 | 2 | — | — | — | — | — |
| 2018–19 | Springfield Thunderbirds | AHL | 51 | 23 | 21 | 44 | 45 | — | — | — | — | — |
| 2018–19 | Florida Panthers | NHL | 31 | 3 | 7 | 10 | 8 | — | — | — | — | — |
| 2019–20 | Florida Panthers | NHL | 21 | 0 | 4 | 4 | 24 | 2 | 0 | 0 | 0 | 0 |
| 2019–20 | Springfield Thunderbirds | AHL | 35 | 13 | 16 | 29 | 22 | — | — | — | — | — |
| 2020–21 | Arizona Coyotes | NHL | 26 | 3 | 5 | 8 | 4 | — | — | — | — | — |
| 2021–22 | New York Rangers | NHL | 76 | 6 | 11 | 17 | 52 | 3 | 0 | 0 | 0 | 0 |
| 2022–23 | New York Rangers | NHL | 3 | 1 | 0 | 1 | 2 | — | — | — | — | — |
| 2022–23 | Colorado Avalanche | NHL | 25 | 1 | 0 | 1 | 13 | — | — | — | — | — |
| 2022–23 | Toronto Maple Leafs | NHL | 9 | 1 | 0 | 1 | 9 | — | — | — | — | — |
| 2022–23 | Toronto Marlies | AHL | 15 | 4 | 5 | 9 | 10 | — | — | — | — | — |
| 2022–23 | Calgary Wranglers | AHL | 17 | 5 | 10 | 15 | 18 | 9 | 3 | 3 | 6 | 16 |
| 2023–24 | Calgary Flames | NHL | 28 | 3 | 5 | 8 | 7 | — | — | — | — | — |
| 2023–24 | Calgary Wranglers | AHL | 23 | 7 | 15 | 22 | 19 | — | — | — | — | — |
| 2024–25 | Calgary Wranglers | AHL | 49 | 16 | 33 | 49 | 40 | 2 | 1 | 1 | 2 | 0 |
| 2024–25 | Calgary Flames | NHL | 5 | 0 | 3 | 3 | 0 | — | — | — | — | — |
| 2025–26 | Calgary Wranglers | AHL | 52 | 18 | 45 | 63 | 64 | — | — | — | — | — |
| 2025–26 | Calgary Flames | NHL | 3 | 0 | 0 | 0 | 2 | — | — | — | — | — |
| NHL totals | | | 238 | 18 | 36 | 54 | 123 | 5 | 0 | 0 | 0 | 0 |

== Awards and honours ==
| Award | Year | Ref |
WHL
| East First All-Star Team | 2016 | |
| Player of the Year | 2016 | |
