= Ben Jones (ice hockey) =

Canadian ice hockey player (born 1999)

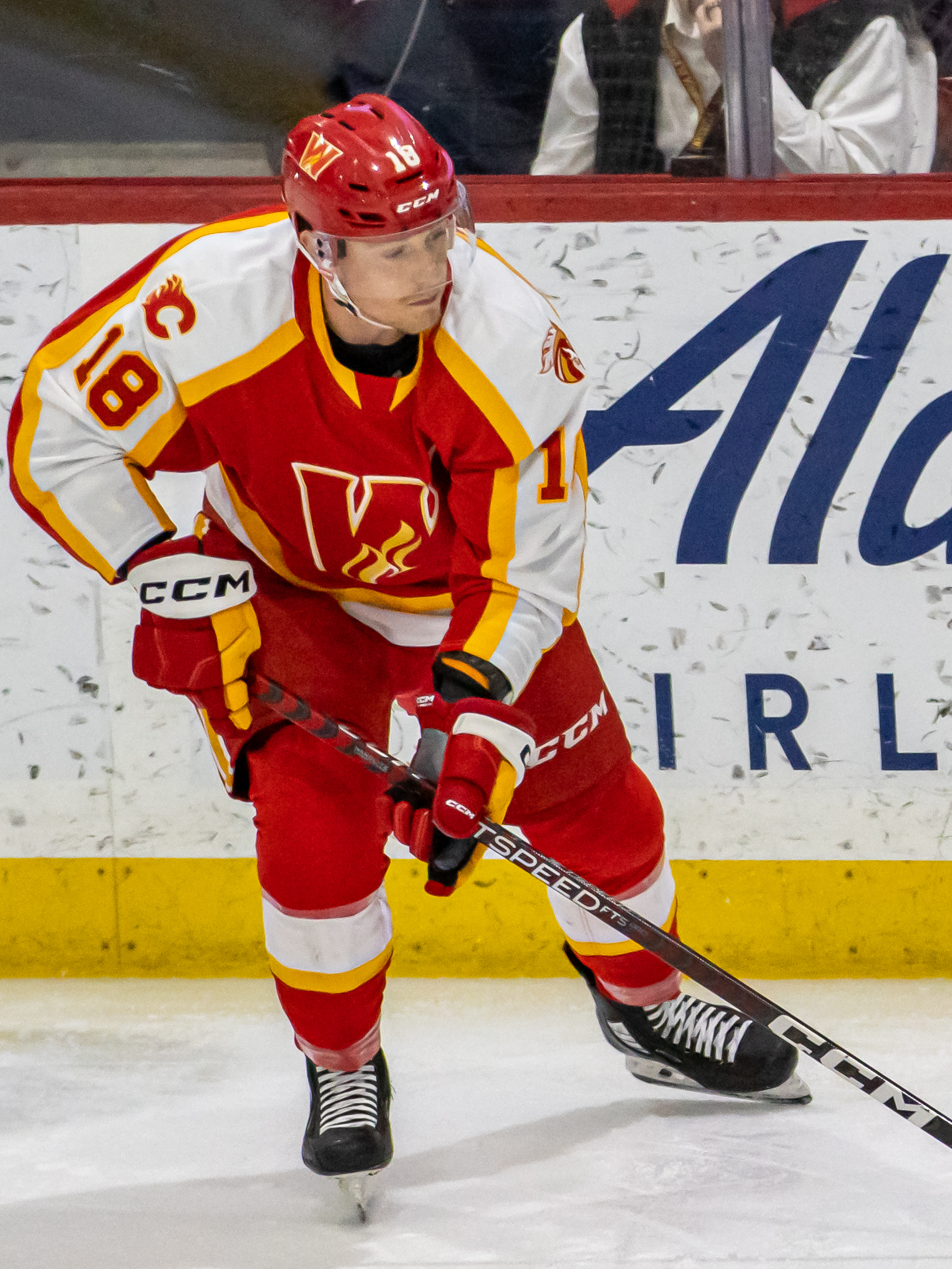
- Ben Jones with the Calgary Wranglers in 2022.
- Born: February 26, 1999 (age 27) Waterloo, Ontario, Canada
- Height: 6 ft 0 in (183 cm)
- Weight: 187 lb (85 kg; 13 st 5 lb)
- Position: Centre
- Shoots: Left
- NHL team (P) Cur. team Former teams: Calgary Flames; Calgary Wranglers (AHL); Vegas Golden Knights; Minnesota Wild
- NHL draft: 189th overall, 2017; Vegas Golden Knights
- Playing career: 2019–present

Benjamin Jones (born Feb 26, 1999) is a Canadian professional ice hockey forward for the Calgary Wranglers of the American Hockey League (AHL) while under contract to the Calgary Flames of the National Hockey League (NHL).

== Playing career ==
Jones was selected by the Vegas Golden Knights in the seventh round of the 2017 NHL entry draft, and played his junior hockey in the Ontario Hockey League (OHL) with the Niagara IceDogs, serving as their captain in 2018–19. He was signed to a three-year, entry-level contract with the Vegas Golden Knights on June 1, 2018, and played his first NHL game on November 20, 2021.

As a free agent from the Golden Knights, Jones was signed to a one-year, two-way contract with the Calgary Flames on July 16, 2022. Jones would spend the 2022–23 season with the Flames top minor league affiliate, the Calgary Wranglers of the AHL. Through 71 games that season, Jones would score 17 goals and tally 37 assists for 54 points, good for third most on the Wranglers.

Following the season, on July 6, 2023, Jones would re-sign with the Flames, again to a one-year two-way contract, worth $775,000 at the NHL level and $120,000 at the AHL level.

After two seasons within the Flames organization, Jones left as a free agent and was signed to a two-year, two-way contract with the Minnesota Wild on July 1, 2024.

His first NHL goal was on January 10, 2026 in a home game vs the New York Islanders.

As a free agent having concluded his tenure with the Wild, Jones returned to the Calgary Flames organization, signing a one-year, two-way contract for the 2026–27 season on July 1, 2026.

== Career statistics ==
=== Regular season and playoffs ===
			Regular season					Playoffs
Season	Team	League	GP	G	A	Pts	PIM	GP	G	A	Pts	PIM
2014–15	Stouffville Spirit	OJHL	1	1	1	2	0	—	—	—	—	—
2015–16	Niagara IceDogs	OHL	61	5	4	9	16	6	0	0	0	4
2016–17	Niagara IceDogs	OHL	63	13	37	50	56	4	0	1	1	6
2017–18	Niagara IceDogs	OHL	68	30	49	79	53	10	5	7	12	10
2018–19	Niagara IceDogs	OHL	68	41	61	102	82	11	2	5	7	8
2019–20	Chicago Wolves	AHL	36	2	5	7	17	—	—	—	—	—
2019–20	Fort Wayne Komets	ECHL	8	1	4	5	7	—	—	—	—	—
2020–21	Henderson Silver Knights	AHL	38	7	9	16	39	5	1	1	2	0
2021–22	Henderson Silver Knights	AHL	66	25	16	41	74	2	0	0	0	2
2021–22	Vegas Golden Knights	NHL	2	0	0	0	2	—	—	—	—	—
2022–23	Calgary Wranglers	AHL	71	17	37	54	63	9	1	1	2	14
2023–24	Calgary Wranglers	AHL	72	21	22	43	59	6	0	0	0	6
2024–25	Iowa Wild	AHL	49	13	23	36	30	—	—	—	—	—
2024–25	Minnesota Wild	NHL	26	0	0	0	10	—	—	—	—	—
2025–26	Iowa Wild	AHL	37	12	20	32	26	—	—	—	—	—
2025–26	Minnesota Wild	NHL	28	1	2	3	0	—	—	—	—	—
NHL totals			56	1	2	3	12	—	—	—	—	—

=== International ===
Year	Team	Event	Result	GP	G	A	Pts	PIM
2015	Canada Black	U17	8th	5	0	1	1	4
Junior totals				5	0	1	1	4
