= 2023–24 Coachella Valley Firebirds season =

Hockey team season

2023–24 Coachella Valley Firebirds
- Western Conference champions
- Pacific Division champions
- League: 2nd AHL
- Division: 1st Pacific
- Conference: 1st Western
- 2023–24 record: 46–15–6–5 (103 pts)
- Home record: 20–10–3
- Road record: 26–5–3
- Goals for: 257
- Goals against: 194

Team information
- General manager: Troy Bodie (de facto - VP of Hockey Operations)
- Coach: Dan Bylsma
- Captain: Max McCormick
- Alternate captains: Gustav Olofsson; Andrew Poturalski
- Arena: Acrisure Arena
- Average attendance: 8,844

Team leaders
- Goals: Max McCormick (32)
- Assists: Kole Lind (48)
- Points: Kole Lind (65)
- Penalty minutes: Ian McKinnon (102)
- Wins: Chris Driedger (24)
- Goals against average: Chris Driedger (2.26)

The 2023–24 Coachella Valley Firebirds season was the franchise's second season in the American Hockey League (AHL), starting on October 13, 2023, and ending on June 24, 2024, after losing to the Hershey Bears in game six of the Calder Cup Finals. They play their home games at Acrisure Arena.

On March 23, 2024, the Firebirds clinched a playoff berth for the second consecutive season following a 4–3 shootout loss against the San Diego Gulls. They clinched the Pacific Division following a 3–1 win over the Ontario Reign on April 10.

== Standings ==
y– indicates team has clinched division and a playoff spot
x– indicates team has clinched a playoff spot
e– indicates team has been eliminated from playoff contention

=== Division ===
Pacific Division	GP	W	L	OTL	SOL	Pts	Pts%	GF	GA
y–Coachella Valley Firebirds (SEA)	72	46	15	6	5	103	.715	252	182
x–Tucson Roadrunners (ARI)	72	43	23	4	2	92	.639	222	214
x–Ontario Reign (LAK)	72	42	23	3	4	91	.632	231	198
x–Colorado Eagles (COL)	72	40	25	5	2	87	.604	215	195
x–Abbotsford Canucks (VAN)	72	40	25	5	2	87	.604	234	210
x–Bakersfield Condors (EDM)	72	39	27	4	2	84	.583	223	202
x–Calgary Wranglers (CGY)	72	35	28	6	3	79	.549	203	212
e–Henderson Silver Knights (VGK)	72	28	36	3	5	64	.444	190	243
e–San Diego Gulls (ANA)	72	26	35	10	1	63	.438	216	245
e–San Jose Barracuda (SJS)	72	24	34	10	4	62	.431	220	260

=== Conference ===
Central Division	GP	W	L	OTL	SOL	Pts	Pts%	GF	GA
y–Coachella Valley Firebirds (SEA)	72	46	15	6	5	103	.715	252	182
y–Milwaukee Admirals (NSH)	72	47	22	2	1	97	.674	238	193
x–Tucson Roadrunners (ARI)	72	43	23	4	2	92	.639	222	214
x–Ontario Reign (LAK)	72	42	23	3	4	91	.632	231	198
x–Colorado Eagles (COL)	72	40	25	5	2	87	.604	215	195
x–Abbotsford Canucks (VAN)	72	40	25	5	2	87	.604	234	210
x–Grand Rapids Griffins (DET)	72	37	23	8	4	86	.597	208	202
x–Rockford IceHogs (CHI)	72	39	26	5	2	85	.590	215	208
x–Bakersfield Condors (EDM)	72	39	27	4	2	84	.583	223	202
x–Calgary Wranglers (CGY)	72	35	28	6	3	79	.549	203	212
x–Texas Stars (DAL)	72	33	33	4	2	72	.500	234	240
x–Manitoba Moose (WPG)	72	34	35	2	1	71	.493	225	243
e–Henderson Silver Knights (VGK)	72	28	36	3	5	64	.444	190	243
e–San Diego Gulls (ANA)	72	26	35	10	1	63	.438	216	245
e–Iowa Wild (MIN)	72	27	37	4	4	62	.431	184	245
e–San Jose Barracuda (SJS)	72	24	34	10	4	62	.431	220	260
e–Chicago Wolves (Ind.)	72	23	35	7	7	60	.417	192	253

== Schedule and results ==
=== Preseason ===
The preseason schedule was released on September 14, 2023.

2023–24 Game Log – Preseason

0–1–0–0 (Home: 0–1–0–0; Road: 0–0–0–0)
#	Date	Visitor	Score	Home	OT	Decision	Attendance	Record	Pts	Report
–	October 6	Ontario	–	Coachella Valley	Canceled due to a power outage at Acrisure Arena
1	October 8	Henderson	3–1	Coachella Valley		Stezka	6,239	0–1–0–0	0	Report

=== Playoffs ===
2024 Game Log – Playoffs

Pacific Division Semifinals vs. (P7) Calgary Wranglers – Firebirds win series 3–1
#	Date	Visitor	Score	Home	OT	Decision	Attendance	Series	Report
1	May 3	Coachella Valley	1–4	Calgary		Driedger	6,067	0–1	Report
2	May 5	Coachella Valley	4–3	Calgary	OT	Driedger	6,097	1–1	Report
3	May 8	Calgary	5–7	Coachella Valley		Driedger	7,581	2–1	Report
4	May 10	Calgary	0–3	Coachella Valley		Driedger	7,936	3–1	Report

Pacific Division Finals vs. (P3) Ontario Reign – Firebirds won 3–0
#	Date	Visitor	Score	Home	OT	Decision	Attendance	Series	Report
1	May 15	Ontario	2–3	Coachella Valley		Driedger	7,633	1–0	Report
2	May 17	Ontario	3–5	Coachella Valley		Driedger	8,682	2–0	Report
3	May 19	Coachella Valley	3–2	Ontario		Driedger	8,355	3–0	Report

Western Conference Finals vs. (C1) Milwaukee Admirals – Firebirds won 4–1
#	Date	Visitor	Score	Home	OT	Decision	Attendance	Series	Report
1	May 30	Milwaukee	1–2	Coachella Valley		Driedger	7,413	1-0	Report
2	June 1	Milwaukee	1–3	Coachella Valley		Driedger	10,087	2–0	Report
3	June 4	Coachella Valley	5–2	Milwaukee		Driedger	4,729	3–0	Report
4	June 6	Coachella Valley	2–7	Milwaukee		Driedger	4,324	3-1	Report
5	June 8	Coachella Valley	5–2	Milwaukee		Driedger	6,059	4–1	Report

Calder Cup Finals vs. (A1) Hershey Bears – Bears won 2–4
#	Date	Visitor	Score	Home	OT	Decision	Attendance	Series	Report
1	June 14	Coachella Valley	4–3	Hershey		Driedger	10,154	1–0	Report
2	June 16	Coachella Valley	2–5	Hershey		Driedger	10,507	1–1	Report
3	June 18	Hershey	2–6	Coachella Valley		Driedger	9,034	2–1	Report
4	June 20	Hershey	3–2	Coachella Valley		Driedger	10,087	2–2	Report
5	June 22	Hershey	3–2	Coachella Valley		Driedger	10,087	2–3	Report
6	June 24	Coachella Valley	4–5	Hershey	OT	Driedger	11,013	2–4	Report

Legend: Win Loss

== Transactions ==
The Firebirds have been involved in the following transactions during the 2023–24 season.

=== Free agents acquired ===
Date	Player	Former team	Term	Ref
August 2, 2023	Jacob Hayhurst	Springfield Thunderbirds	1-year	
August 16, 2023	Kyle Jackson	North Bay Battalion (OHL)	1-year	
August 23, 2023	Jack LaFontaine	Syracuse Crunch	1-year	
September 6, 2023	Ryan Jones	Syracuse Crunch	1-year	
September 13, 2023	Justin Nachbaur	Ontario Reign	1-year	
September 20, 2023	Patrick Curry	Iowa Wild	1-year	

=== Free agents lost ===
Date	Player	New team	Ref
July 1, 2023	Jimmy Schuldt	Seattle Kraken (NHL)	
July 1, 2023	Shane Starrett	Providence Bruins	
August 15, 2023	Tristan Mullin	Hartford Wolf Pack	

=== Other signings ===
Date	Player	Term	Ref
July 19, 2023	Ian McKinnon	1-year	
July 27, 2023	Jeremy McKenna	1-year	
August 18, 2023	Jake McLaughlin	1-year	
December 11, 2023	Cale Morris	PTO (25 games)	
