= Brad Larsen =

Canadian ice hockey player (born 1977)

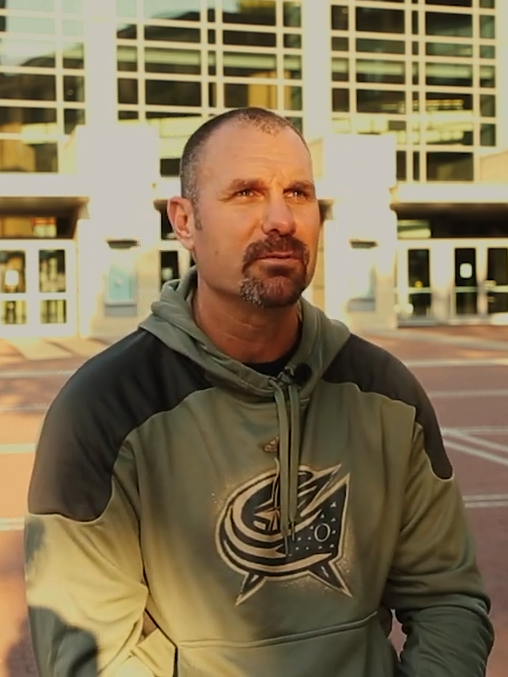
- Larsen in 2021
- Born: June 28, 1977 (age 49) Nakusp, British Columbia, Canada
- Height: 6 ft 0 in (183 cm)
- Weight: 200 lb (91 kg; 14 st 4 lb)
- Position: Left wing
- Shot: Left
- Played for: Colorado Avalanche; Atlanta Thrashers
- Coached for: Columbus Blue Jackets
- NHL draft: 53rd overall, 1995; Ottawa Senators; 87th overall, 1997; Colorado Avalanche
- Playing career: 1997–2010
- Coaching career: 2010–present

Brad Larsen (born June 28, 1977) is a Canadian professional ice hockey coach and former player who is an assistant coach for the Calgary Flames of the National Hockey League (NHL).

Before coaching, he played eight seasons in the NHL with the Colorado Avalanche and the Atlanta Thrashers. He is the former head coach of the Columbus Blue Jackets and the Springfield Falcons of the American Hockey League (AHL).

== Playing career ==
Larsen was born in Nakusp, British Columbia, but grew up in Vernon, British Columbia. He played junior ice hockey for the Swift Current Broncos where he attracted NHL scouts' attention. Larsen was drafted in round 3, 53rd overall by the Ottawa Senators in the 1995 NHL entry draft. His rights were traded to the Colorado Avalanche in 1996. He was not signed by the Avalanche and subsequently re-entered the draft, where he was drafted 87th overall in the 1997 NHL entry draft by the Avalanche.

Larsen's first four professional years were spent almost entirely with Colorado's AHL affiliate, the Hershey Bears, before securing a full-time role as a member of the Avalanche in the 2001–02 season. He could not establish himself in the NHL because he was blighted by persistent back and groin injuries in the 2002–03 season. Larsen returned in the 2003–04 season and spent time with both Hershey and Colorado before he was claimed off waivers by the Atlanta Thrashers on February 25, 2004.

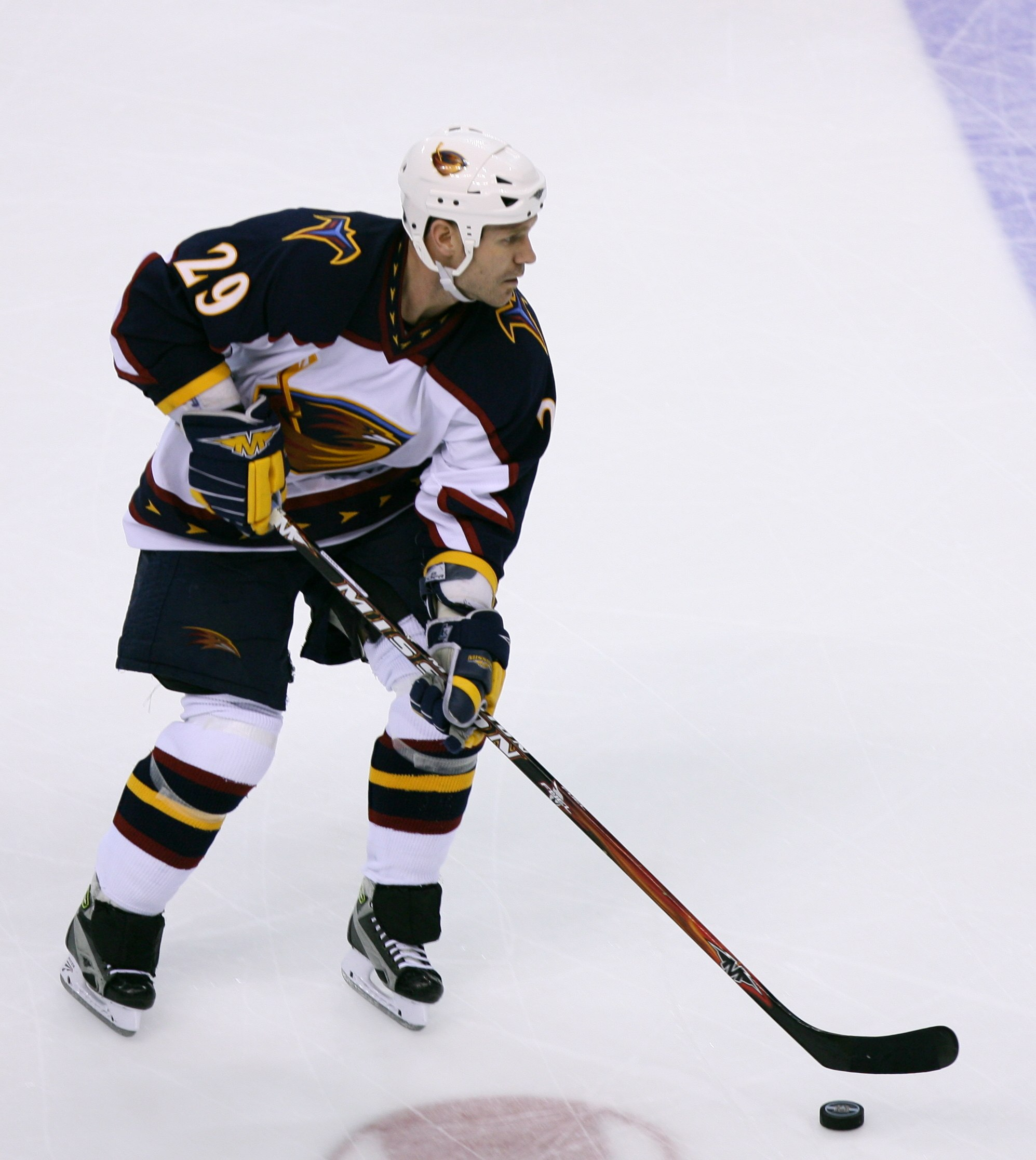
Larsen with the Atlanta Thrashers in 2004

During the 2004–05 NHL lockout, Larsen made a return to full health playing in a career-high 75 games with the Thrashers AHL affiliate, the Chicago Wolves. Upon resumption of the NHL in the 2005–06 season, Larsen established a checking line role with the Thrashers and posted a career-high 7 goals for 15 points. After playing in an NHL-high 72 games and helping Atlanta reach their maiden postseason the following season, Larsen was re-signed by the Thrashers to a two-year contract extension on June 22, 2007. A mainstay on the Thrashers' fourth line, Larsen's offensive contributions dipped in the 2007–08 season, scoring just 1 goal and four points.

On September 26, 2008, Larsen was traded by Atlanta, along with Ken Klee and Chad Painchaud, to the Anaheim Ducks for Mathieu Schneider. Larsen's injury woes returned at the start of the 2008–09 season, after suffering a sports hernia; he was then required to have hip surgery which consequently keep him sidelined for the entire season without debuting for the Ducks.

A free agent, Larsen was invited to the Buffalo Sabres training camp for the 2009–10 season, before signing with its AHL affiliate, the Portland Pirates on September 12, 2009. As a part of the leadership group with the Pirates, Larsen made his return to the ice and posted 13 goals and 27 points in 55 games. Helping the Pirates reach the quarterfinals in the Calder Cup playoffs, Larsen later announced his retirement to become an assistant coach with the Springfield Falcons of the AHL on August 20, 2010.

== Coaching career ==
Larsen was an assistant coach for the Springfield Falcons between 2010 and 2012. He was later promoted as head coach of the team, spending two seasons in that role between 2012 and 2014. Larsen was hired as an assistant coach for the Columbus Blue Jackets in 2014. On June 10, 2021, after seven seasons as an assistant, Larsen was named head coach of the Blue Jackets. On April 15, 2023, after failing to make the playoffs in either year under his leadership, the Blue Jackets fired Larsen.

On June 11, 2024, Larsen was named as an Assistant Coach of the Calgary Flames.

On December 27, 2024, the Calgary Flames called up Trent Cull from his Calgary Wranglers head coaching position on an interim basis as an Assistant Coach while his colleague, Brad Larsen, had left earlier in the month to deal with a family matter.

== Personal life ==
Larsen and his wife have two children. He is a Christian. Larsen's wife Hannah died in early 2026 from cancer. Larsen had previously taken a leave of absence from the Flames in December 2024 when her condition worsened.

== Career statistics ==
=== Regular season and playoffs ===
			Regular season					Playoffs
Season	Team	League	GP	G	A	Pts	PIM	GP	G	A	Pts	PIM
1992–93	Nelson Leafs	RMJHL	42	31	37	68	164	—	—	—	—	—
1993–94	Swift Current Broncos	WHL	64	15	18	33	32	7	1	2	3	4
1994–95	Swift Current Broncos	WHL	62	24	33	57	73	6	0	1	1	2
1995–96	Swift Current Broncos	WHL	51	30	47	77	67	6	3	2	5	13
1996–97	Swift Current Broncos	WHL	61	36	46	82	61	—	—	—	—	—
1997–98	Hershey Bears	AHL	65	12	10	22	80	7	3	2	5	2
1997–98	Colorado Avalanche	NHL	1	0	0	0	0	—	—	—	—	—
1998–99	Hershey Bears	AHL	18	3	4	7	11	5	0	1	1	6
1999–00	Hershey Bears	AHL	52	13	26	39	66	14	5	2	7	29
2000–01	Hershey Bears	AHL	67	21	25	46	93	10	1	3	4	6
2000–01	Colorado Avalanche	NHL	9	0	0	0	0	—	—	—	—	—
2001–02	Colorado Avalanche	NHL	50	2	7	9	47	21	1	1	2	13
2002–03	Hershey Bears	AHL	25	3	6	9	25	4	1	1	2	8
2002–03	Colorado Avalanche	NHL	6	0	3	3	2	—	—	—	—	—
2003–04	Hershey Bears	AHL	21	4	13	17	40	—	—	—	—	—
2003–04	Colorado Avalanche	NHL	26	2	2	4	11	—	—	—	—	—
2003–04	Atlanta Thrashers	NHL	6	0	0	0	2	—	—	—	—	—
2004–05	Chicago Wolves	AHL	75	26	23	49	112	18	4	7	11	22
2005–06	Atlanta Thrashers	NHL	62	7	8	15	21	—	—	—	—	—
2005–06	Chicago Wolves	AHL	6	1	0	1	8	—	—	—	—	—
2006–07	Atlanta Thrashers	NHL	72	7	6	13	39	4	0	2	2	0
2007–08	Atlanta Thrashers	NHL	62	1	3	4	12	—	—	—	—	—
2009–10	Portland Pirates	AHL	55	13	14	27	40	4	0	0	0	0
NHL totals			294	19	29	48	134	25	1	3	4	13

Medal record

Representing Canada

Men's ice hockey

World Under 17 Hockey Challenge
Bronze medal – third place	1994 Amos	

World Junior Championship
Gold medal – first place	1996 Boston	
Gold medal – first place	1997 Geneva	

=== International ===
Year	Team	Event	Result	GP	G	A	Pts	PIM
1994	Canada Pacific	WHC17	3rd place, bronze medalist(s)	6	1	0	1	0
1996	Canada	WJC	1st place, gold medalist(s)	6	1	1	2	4
1997	Canada	WJC	1st place, gold medalist(s)	7	0	1	1	6
Junior totals				19	2	2	4	10

== Head coaching record ==
Team	Year	Regular season						Postseason			
Team	Year	G	W	L	OTL	Pts	Finish	W	L	Win%	Result
CBJ	2021–22	82	37	38	7	81	6th in Metropolitan	—	—	—	Missed playoffs
CBJ	2022–23	82	25	48	9	59	8th in Metropolitan	—	—	—	Missed playoffs
Total		164	62	86	16			—	—	—	

== Awards and honors ==
Award	Year
WHL
East Second All-Star Team	1997

Sporting positions
Preceded by John Tortorella	Head coach of the Columbus Blue Jackets; 2021–2023	Succeeded by Mike Babcock
