= Trent Cull =

Canadian ice hockey player and coach

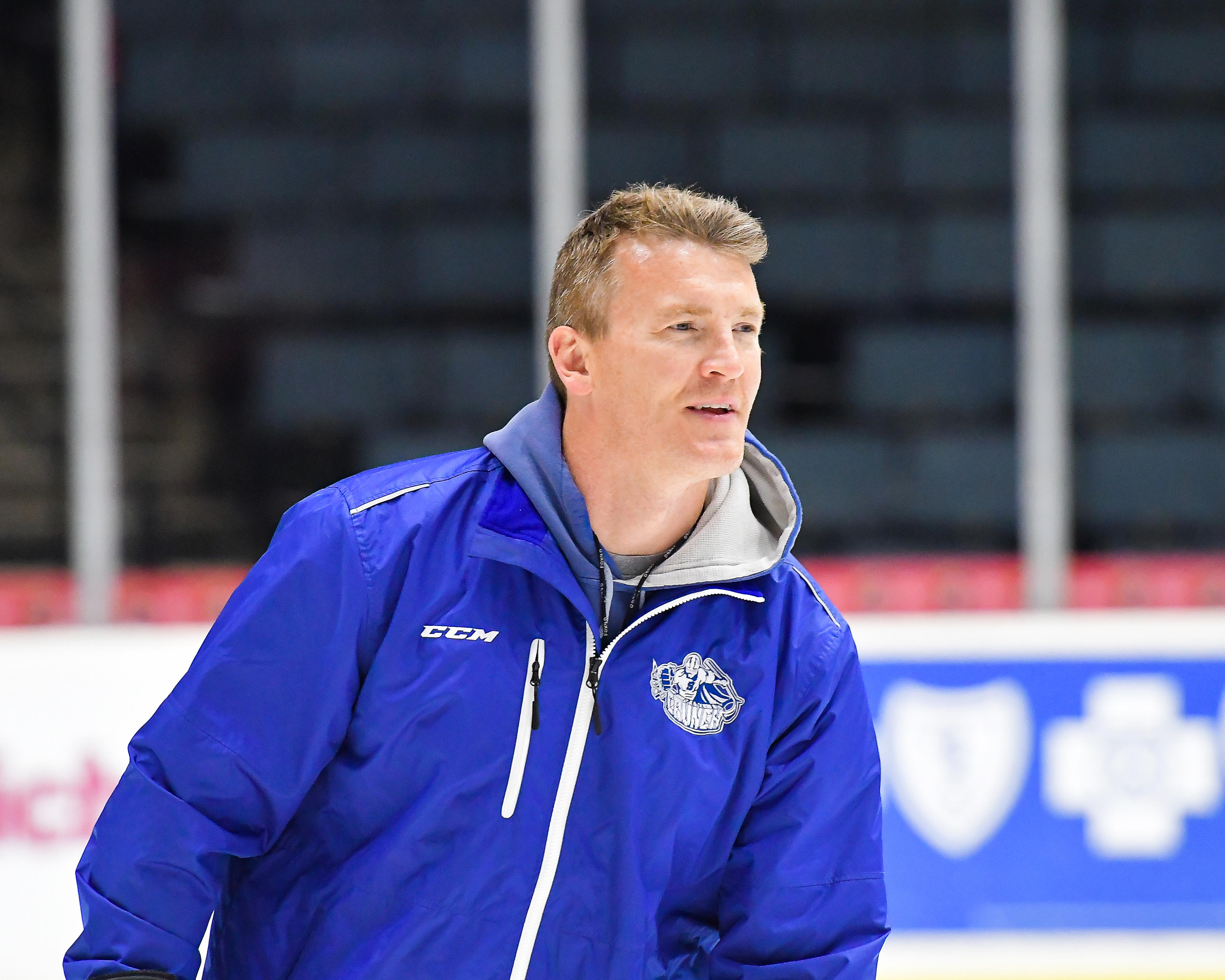
- Cull with the Syracuse Crunch in 2017
- Born: September 27, 1973 (age 52) Georgetown, Ontario, Canada
- Height: 6 ft 2 in (188 cm)
- Weight: 209 lb (95 kg; 14 st 13 lb)
- Position: Defence
- Shot: Left
- Played for: AHL; St. John's Maple Leafs; Springfield Falcons; Wilkes-Barre/Scranton Penguins; Houston Aeros; Syracuse Crunch; CoHL; Brantford Smoke; IHL; Houston Aeros
- NHL draft: Undrafted
- Playing career: 1994–2004
- Coaching career: 2004–present

Trent Cull (born September 27, 1973) is a Canadian former professional ice hockey defenceman who is currently serving as an assistant coach for the Calgary Flames of the National Hockey League (NHL). Previously, Cull served as an assistant coach with the Vancouver Canucks of the NHL, as well as the head coach of several American Hockey League (AHL) teams.

== Playing career ==
=== Junior ===
During the 1988-89 season, Cull played for the Georgetown Raiders of the Central Ontario Junior C Hockey League (COJHL). His play there earned him a spot in the major juniors for the 1989-90 season after being drafted 7th overall by the Guelph Platers of the Ontario Hockey League (OHL) during the 1989 draft. The team would relocate to become the Owen Sound Platers before the start of the season. Cull would struggle to score during his time with the Platers, recording only a single goal and seven assists in 81 games with the team. Midway through the 1990-91 season Cull requested a trade out of Owen Sound, claiming "the atmosphere" wasn't right, and was traded to the Windsor Spitfires.

Cull was traded right at the trade deadline of the 1991-92 season on January 10, 1992, to the Kingston Frontenacs along with a 6th-round draft pick for Rod Pasma and Gord Harris.

Cull would spend the rest of his time in major junior with the Frontenacs, where he would begin to play a significantly more physical game, earning 322 penalty minutes in 128 games.

=== Professional ===
Prior to the 1993-94 NHL season, Cull was invited to the Boston Bruins training camp, but was not offered a contract.

After aging out of the OHL, Cull started his professional career with the Brantford Smoke of the Colonial Hockey League (CoHL), where his play quickly earned him a spot with the St. John's Maple Leafs of the American Hockey League (AHL).

After three seasons with the Leafs, he would spend two and a half seasons with the Houston Aeros of the International Hockey League (IHL) before moving to the Springfield Falcons, where he would play alongside future Calgary coaching colleague Ryan Huska.

Cull would spend the rest of his playing career in the AHL, spending time with the Wilkes-Barre/Scranton Penguins, the Houston Aeros (who had moved to the AHL following the IHL's folding in 2001), and the Syracuse Crunch.

Over the course of his ten-season professional career, Cull would score 32 goals, 118 points, and accrue 1767 penalty minutes.

== Coaching career ==
Following his playing career, Cull took up coaching to work as an AHL assistant coach with the Syracuse Crunch under Ross Yates from 2006 to 2010. He then accepted a head coaching position in the Ontario Hockey League with the Sudbury Wolves, where he remained for three seasons before returning to the Syracuse Crunch as an assistant coach with the 2013–14 season. In 2017, he was named head coach of the Utica Comets by their NHL affiliate, the Vancouver Canucks. He remained with the AHL team when it relocated as the Abbotsford Canucks in 2021.

On July 1, 2022, Cull was named an assistant coach for the Vancouver Canucks, where he would be fired in the middle of his first season along with head coach Bruce Boudreau.

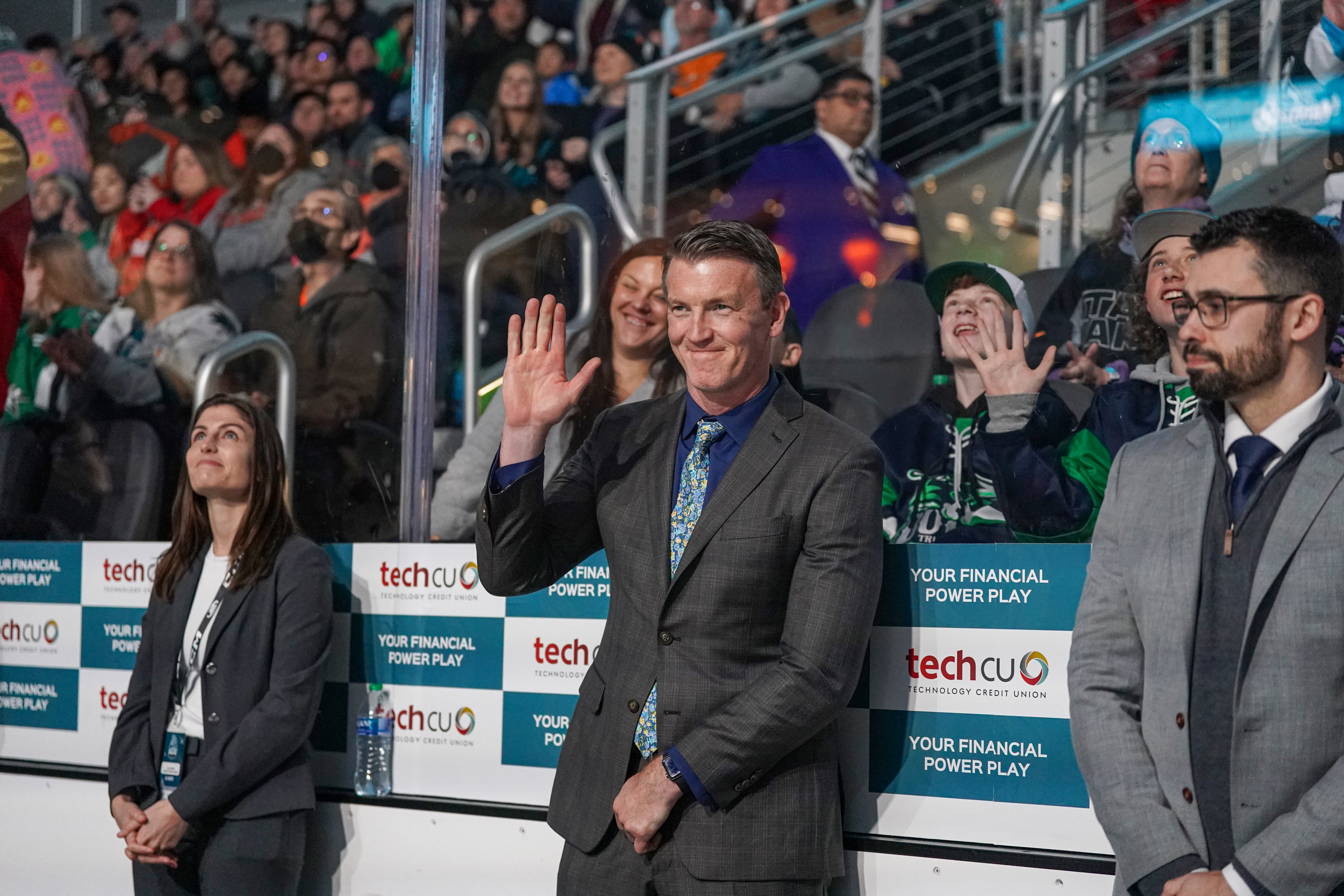
Cull represented the Pacific division as a coach at the 2024 AHL All-Star Classic.

On July 17, 2023, Cull was named the head coach of the Calgary Wranglers, the top AHL affiliate of the Calgary Flames. During the 2023–24 AHL season, due to the Wranglers position at the top of the Pacific division at the end of the calendar year, Cull was named as a coach for the 2024 AHL All-Star Classic.

On December 27, 2024, the Calgary Flames called up Cull from his Wranglers position on an interim basis as an Assistant Coach with the Wranglers' parent team, while Brad Larsen, took leave from the team. On May 30, 2025, Cull was named a full time assistant coach for the Flames.

== Career statistics ==
			Regular season					Playoffs
Season	Team	League	GP	G	A	Pts	PIM	GP	G	A	Pts	PIM
1988–89	Georgetown Raiders	COJHL	36	1	5	6	51	—	—	—	—	—
1989–90	Owen Sound Platers	OHL	57	0	5	5	53	12	0	2	2	11
1990–91	Owen Sound Platers	OHL	24	1	2	3	19	—	—	—	—	—
1990–91	Windsor Spitfires	OHL	33	1	6	7	34	11	0	0	0	8
1991–92	Windsor Spitfires	OHL	32	0	6	6	66	—	—	—	—	—
1991–92	Kingston Frontenacs	OHL	18	0	0	0	31	—	—	—	—	—
1992–93	Kingston Frontenacs	OHL	60	11	28	39	144	16	2	8	10	37
1993–94	Kingston Frontenacs	OHL	50	2	30	32	147	6	0	1	1	6
1994–95	Brantford Smoke	CoHL	4	0	0	0	14	—	—	—	—	—
1994–95	St. John's Maple Leafs	AHL	43	0	1	1	53	—	—	—	—	—
1995–96	St. John's Maple Leafs	AHL	46	2	1	3	118	4	0	0	0	6
1996–97	St. John's Maple Leafs	AHL	75	4	5	9	219	8	0	1	1	18
1997–98	Houston Aeros	IHL	72	4	8	12	201	4	0	0	0	4
1998–99	Houston Aeros	IHL	72	2	14	16	232	19	0	2	2	34
1999–00	Springfield Falcons	AHL	28	0	2	2	74	—	—	—	—	—
1999–00	Houston Aeros	IHL	35	2	7	9	133	5	0	0	0	24
2000–01	Wilkes-Barre/Scranton Penguins	AHL	71	11	15	26	166	21	3	2	5	28
2001–02	Houston Aeros	AHL	74	1	11	12	158	12	0	2	2	8
2002–03	Syracuse Crunch	AHL	40	0	8	8	115	—	—	—	—	—
2003–04	Syracuse Crunch	AHL	58	2	7	9	146	5	1	0	1	16
AHL totals			435	20	50	70	1,049	50	4	5	9	76

== Coaching record ==
=== AHL ===
Team	Season	Regular season							Post season
Team	Season	G	W	L	T	OTL/SOL	Pts	Finish	Result
Utica Comets	2017–18	76	38	26	—	12	88	4th, North	Lost in round 1
Utica Comets	2018–19	76	34	34	—	8	76	6th, North	Missed playoffs
Utica Comets	2019–20	61	34	22	—	5	73	3rd, North	Season cancelled
Utica Comets	2020–21	28	16	11	—	1	33	4th, North	No playoffs were held
Abbotsford Canucks	2021–22	68	39	23	—	6	84	4th, Pacific	Lost in qualifying round
Calgary Wranglers	2023–24	68	35	28	—	9	79	7th, Pacific	Lost in Division Semifinals
