= Calgary Wranglers =

- City: Calgary, Alberta
- League: American Hockey League
- Conference: Western
- Division: Pacific
- Founded: 1977
- Home arena: Scotiabank Saddledome
- Colours: Red, yellow, white
- Owner: Calgary Sports and Entertainment
- General manager: Brad Pascall
- Head coach: Brett Sutter
- Captain: Rory Kerins
- Affiliates: Calgary Flames (NHL); Rapid City Rush (ECHL)

Franchise history
- 1977–1987: Maine Mariners
- 1987–1993: Utica Devils
- 1993–2003: Saint John Flames
- 2005–2007: Omaha Ak-Sar-Ben Knights
- 2007–2009: Quad City Flames
- 2009–2014: Abbotsford Heat
- 2014–2015: Adirondack Flames
- 2015–2022: Stockton Heat
- 2022–present: Calgary Wranglers

Championships
- Regular season titles: 1 (2022–23)
- Division titles: 1 (2022–23)

The Calgary Wranglers are a professional ice hockey team based in Calgary. They are members of the Pacific Division in the Western Conference of the American Hockey League (AHL). The team plays at the Scotiabank Saddledome, the home of their National Hockey League (NHL) affiliate team, the Calgary Flames.

== History ==
=== 2022–2023: First season in Calgary ===
On May 23, 2022, the Calgary Flames announced the relocation of the Stockton Heat to Calgary. This followed a recent trend of Canadian NHL teams moving their AHL affiliates closer to home, principally to allow for players to be called up on a shorter notice. On August 2, 2022, the team announced its name, bringing back the "Wranglers" moniker used by the WHL team of the same name from 1977 to 1987. Mitch Love, the head coach of the Heat, would remain with the team during their relocation to Calgary. Ahead of the 2022–23 AHL season's start, on October 14, 2022, former Flames draft pick Brett Sutter was named as the team's first captain, with Nick DeSimone and Matthew Phillips being named as alternate captains.

The Wranglers played their first game on October 16, 2022, a 6–5 loss against the Coachella Valley Firebirds. Despite a slow start to the season, the Wranglers enjoyed significant success in their inaugural year, capturing the regular season championship with 51 wins, and being awarded the Macgregor Kilpatrick Trophy. Their overall 51–17–4 record was the ninth-best record in AHL history.

The Wranglers' dominant regular season performance would result in several members of the team winning substantial awards during the inaugural season: star goaltender Dustin Wolf would win every trophy available for his position, including being named as the league's MVP. Wolf, along with forward Matthew Phillips, would be named to the First All-Star Team, with defenseman Jeremie Poirier being named to the All-Rookie team. Head coach Mitch Love would be named as the AHL's coach of the year, winning the Louis A. R. Pieri Memorial Award.

As a result of capturing the Pacific Division title, the Wranglers would earn a bye past the first round of the 2023 Calder Cup playoffs. During their second-round match-up against the Abbotsford Canucks, the Wranglers would win the best-of-five series three games to one. Ultimately, the Wranglers would fail to live up to their regular season success during the playoffs, losing during overtime in the fifth and final game of the third round to the Coachella Valley Firebirds.

=== 2023–2024: Sophomore season ===
Following the 2022–23 season, head coach Mitch Love would earn a job as an assistant coach with the Washington Capitals. Resultingly, former Vancouver Canucks assistant coach Trent Cull was hired as the Wranglers head coach for the 2023–24 season. During the first half of the season the Wranglers would enjoy continued success, finishing 2023 at the top of the Pacific Division, resulting in head coach Cull being tapped as a coach for the season's All-Star Classic. However, as the season wore on, many of the team's top talent was depleted, either by trades or call-ups to the Flames, and the team fell behind in a tight playoff race, not clinching their spot in the 2024 Calder Cup playoffs until March 31, 2024, nearly 3 weeks later than the previous season.

Ahead of the playoffs, key players Dustin Wolf, Ilya Solovyov, Adam Klapka, and Matt Coronato would be returned to the Wranglers roster after the conclusion of the Flames 2023–24 season. During the playoffs, the 7-seed Wranglers would sweep the 2-seed Tucson Roadrunners in the best-of-three first-round, moving on to face the division champions in the Coachella Valley Firebirds for a second consecutive postseason. During the second round, the Wranglers would win game one, before losing three in a row to end their season in the best-of-five series. Game two of the series would end controversially when the Firebirds scored the game-winning overtime goal during a sequence that appeared to be offside, with too many men, and potential goaltender and player interference, though due to league rules, the goal could not be reviewed.

=== 2024–present: Flames rebuild ===
Towards the end of the 2023–24 season, the Flames entered into a rebuild, trading many of their core players for prospects and draft picks. This shift in strategy meant several Wranglers players would now be expected to make the full time jump to the Flames for the 2024–25 NHL season. In preparation for this, the Wranglers and Flames both signed several players likely to play in the minor-leagues ahead of the 2024–25 AHL season, including goaltender Devin Cooley.

On July 15, 2024, Wranglers captain Brett Sutter announced he would be retiring from playing, and would instead be joining the team as an assistant coach.

On December 27, 2024, the Calgary Flames called up head coach Cull from the Wranglers on an interim basis as an assistant coach while a Flames colleague, Brad Larsen, has taken temporary leave. Wranglers assistant Joe Cirella will be the team’s interim head coach, and Flames player development staffer Martin Gelinas will join the Wranglers coaching staff on an interim basis.

== Season-by-season results ==
Regular season											Playoffs					
Season	Games	Won	Lost	OTL	SOL	Points	PCT	GF	GA	Standing	Year	1st Round	Div Semi-finals	Div finals	Conf. finals	Finals
2022–23	72	51	17	3	1	106	.736	256	174	1st, Pacific	2023	BYE	W, 3–1, ABB	L, 2–3, CV	—	—
2023–24	72	35	28	6	3	79	.549	203	212	7th, Pacific	2024	W, 2–0, TUC	L, 1–3, CV	—	—	—
2024–25	72	37	28	4	3	81	.563	230	239	5th, Pacific	2025	L, 0–2, CV	—	—	—	—
2025–26	72	23	34	10	5	61	.424	203	269	10th, Pacific	2026	—	—	—	—	—

== Players ==
=== Current roster ===
Updated November 8, 2026.

No.	Nat	Player	Pos	S/G	Age	Acquired	Birthplace	Contract
21	(Canada)	Kent Anderson	D	R	22	2026	Calgary, Alberta	Wranglers
49	(Canada)	Andrew Basha	LW	L	21	2025	Calgary, Alberta	Flames
2	(Canada)	Mike Benning	D	R	24	2026	Edmonton, Alberta	Flames
48	(United States)	Hunter Brzustewicz	D	R	21	2024	Washington, Michigan	Flames
10	(United States)	Will Dineen	F	L	25	2026	Queensbury, New York	Wranglers
20	(Canada)	Alex Gallant (A)	LW	L	33	2022	Summerside, Prince Edward Island	Wranglers
34	(Canada)	Tyson Gross	C	R	24	2026	Calgary, Alberta	Flames
25	(Canada)	Ryan Hofer	C	L	24	2026	Headingley, Manitoba	Wranglers
15	(Canada)	Dryden Hunt (A)	LW	L	30	2023	Cranbrook, British Columbia	Flames
3	(Sweden)	Axel Hurtig	D	L	21	2026	Högås, Sweden	Flames
18	(Canada)	Ben Jones (A)	C	L	27	2026	Waterloo, Ontario	Flames
6	(Canada)	Rory Kerins (C)	C	L	24	2022	Caledon, Ontario	Flames
23	(Canada)	Jake Livingstone	D	R	27	2026	Creston, British Columbia	Flames
45	(United States)	Sam Morton (A)	LW	L	27	2024	Lafayette, Colorado	Flames
92	(Sweden)	Alexander Nylander	RW	R	28	2026	Calgary, Alberta	Flames
41	(Russia)	Nikita Pavlychev (PTO)	C	L	29	2026	Yaroslavl, Russia	Wranglers
39	(Canada)	Luke Philp	C	R	31	2026	Canmore, Alberta	Wranglers
30	(Canada)	Owen Say	G	L	25	2025	London, Ontario	Wranglers
35	(Russia)	Arsenii Sergeev	G	L	23	2025	Yaroslavl, Russia	Flames
24	(Canada)	Kyle Walker	D	L	26	2026	Leduc, Alberta	Wranglers
5	(Canada)	Abram Wiebe	D	L	23	2026	Mission, British Columbia	Flames
16	(Canada)	Carter Wilkie	C	R	26	2025	Calgary, Alberta	Wranglers
40	(Russia)	Kirill Zarubin	G	L	21	2026	Penza, Russia	Flames
47	(Canada)	Connor Zary	C	L	25	2026	Saskatoon, Saskatchewan	Flames

=== Team captains ===
- Brett Sutter, 2022–24
- Clark Bishop, 2024–26
- Rory Kerins, 2026–

=== Notable alumni ===
The following players have played both 100 games for the Calgary Wranglers and 100 games in the National Hockey League:

- Dryden Hunt
- Martin Frk

== Team records ==
Records as of the end of the 2023–24 AHL regular season

Single season records
Goals: 36, Matthew Phillips (2022-23)
Assists: 40, Matthew Phillips (2022-23)
Points: 76, Matthew Phillips (2022–23)
Penalty minutes: 114, Alex Gallant (2022–23)
Wins: 42, Dustin Wolf (2022–23)
GAA: 2.09, Dustin Wolf (2022–23)
SV%: .932, Dustin Wolf (2022–23)
Shutouts: 7, Dustin Wolf (2022–23)

- Goaltending records need a minimum 25 games played by the goaltender

Single playoff records
Goals: 4, Jakob Pelletier (2022-2023), Adam Klapka (2022–23), and Cole Schwindt (2023-2024),
Assists: 6, Jakob Pelletier (2022-2023), Jérémie Poirier (2022-2023), and Matthew Phillips (2022-2023)
Points: 10, Jakob Pelletier (2022-2023)
Penalty minutes: 16, Dryden Hunt (2022-2023)
