= Texas Stars =

American Hockey League team in Cedar Park, Texas

- City: Cedar Park, Texas
- League: American Hockey League
- Conference: Western
- Division: Central
- Founded: 1999
- Operated: 2009–present
- Home arena: H-E-B Center at Cedar Park
- Colors: Victory green, silver, black, white
- Owner: Tom Gaglardi
- General manager: Scott White
- Head coach: Toby Petersen
- Captain: Curtis McKenzie
- Media: KBVO (TV) (channel 14); AHL.TV (Internet)
- Affiliates: Dallas Stars (NHL); Idaho Steelheads (ECHL)

Franchise history
- 1999–2001: Louisville Panthers
- 2005–2008: Iowa Stars
- 2008–2009: Iowa Chops
- 2009–present: Texas Stars

Championships
- Regular season titles: 1 (2013–14)
- Division titles: 3 (2012–13, 2013–14, 2022–23)
- Conference titles: 3 (2010, 2014, 2018)
- Calder Cups: 1 (2014)

The Texas Stars are a professional ice hockey team based in Cedar Park, Texas. They are the American Hockey League (AHL) affiliate of the National Hockey League's (NHL) Dallas Stars. They play their homes games at the H-E-B Center.

== History ==
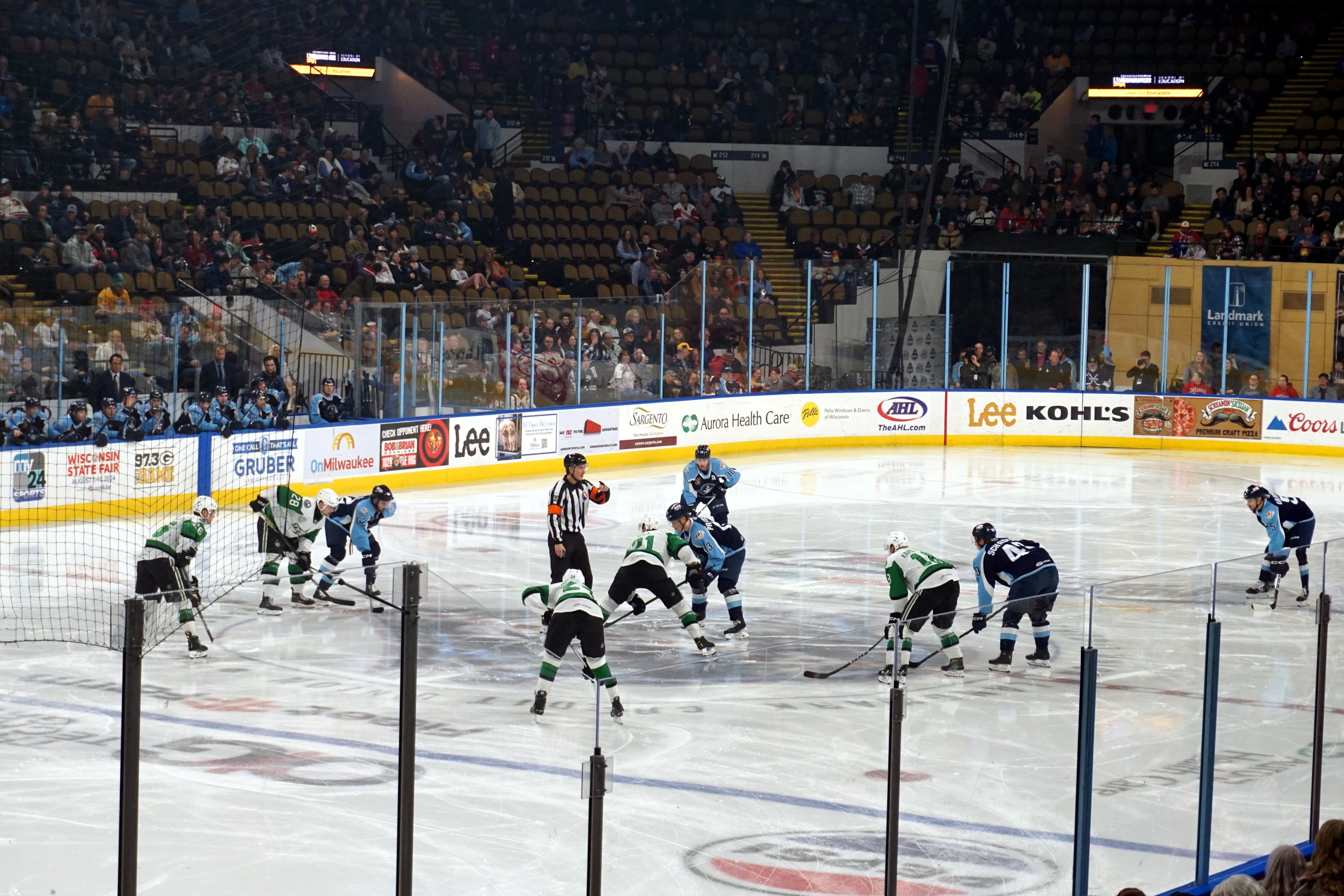
The Stars playing at the Milwaukee Admirals in 2024

In April 2008, the Iowa Stars announced that they would no longer affiliate with the Dallas Stars and changed the team's name to Chops for the 2008–09 season. For the 2008–09 season, Dallas made agreements to send their AHL prospects to four other teams, while a few remained with the Chops. AHL teams that received Dallas Stars prospects were the Hamilton Bulldogs, Manitoba Moose, Peoria Rivermen, and Grand Rapids Griffins.

On April 28, 2009, the AHL granted a provisional Austin-area franchise to Tom Hicks, owner of the NHL Stars, with the stipulation that Hicks purchase an existing AHL franchise within one year. That condition was met on May 4, 2010, when the AHL approved the Texas Stars' ownership group's purchase of the Iowa Chops franchise, which had been suspended for the 2009–10 season.

The team's inaugural season was a successful one. After finishing second in the West Division, the Stars swept Rockford in the first round of the playoffs, then claimed their first division championship by defeating Chicago four games to three. The Stars then won their first Robert W. Clarke Trophy by defeating Hamilton in another seven-game series to become the Western Conference champions. The Stars eventually fell to Hershey in game six of the 2010 Calder Cup Finals.

The Stars won the Calder Cup in 2014, defeating the St. John's IceCaps in the finals. After the season, head coach Willie Desjardins resigned to accept the head coaching position with the Vancouver Canucks. In July 2014 he was succeeded by Derek Laxdal, who won a Kelly Cup championship with the Stars' ECHL affiliate, the Idaho Steelheads, in 2007. Also during 2014, the Stars were purchased by Tom Gaglardi's ownership group, thus having the AHL affiliate under control of the parent club.

On June 11, 2015, the Stars unveiled their new logo, color scheme, and jerseys to more closely match the parent club's identity.

In 2018, the Stars once again made it to the Calder Cup finals, but lost to the Toronto Marlies in seven games. During the 2019–20 season, head coach Laxdal was promoted to the Dallas Stars as an assistant and the Texas Stars promoted Neil Graham to head coaching position.

In 2023-24, despite the Stars having a relatively disappointing 33-33-4 record during the regular season, Mavrik Bourque was the AHL’s top scorer and was awarded the league’s regular season MVP award, posting 26 goals and 51 assists for 77 points in 71 games.

At the conclusion of the 2024-25 season it was announced that head coach Neil Graham would be promoted to the Dallas Stars, with former player and AHL assistant coach Toby Petersen being named as the new head coach of the Texas Stars.

== Season-by-season results ==
Calder Cup champions	Conference champions	Division champions	League leader

Regular season											Playoffs					
Season	GP	W	L	OTL	SOL	Pts	PCT	GF	GA	Standing	Year	Prelims	1st round	2nd round	3rd round	Finals
2009–10	80	46	27	3	4	99	.619	238	198	2nd, West	2010	—	W, 4–0, RFD	W, 4–3, CHI	W, 4–3, HAM	L, 2–4, HER
2010–11	80	41	29	4	6	92	.575	213	210	4th, West	2011	—	L, 2–4, MIL	—	—	—
2011–12	76	31	40	3	2	67	.441	224	251	5th, West	2012	Did not qualify				
2012–13	76	43	22	5	6	97	.638	235	201	1st, South	2013	—	W, 3–1, MIL	L, 1–4, OKC	—	—
2013–14	76	48	18	3	7	106	.697	274	197	1st, West	2014	—	W, 3–0, OKC	W, 4–2, GR	W, 4–3, TOR	W, 4–1, STJ
2014–15	76	40	22	13	1	94	.618	242	216	2nd, West	2015	—	L, 0–3, RFD	—	—	—
2015–16	76	40	25	8	3	91	.599	277	246	3rd, Pacific	2016	—	L, 1–3, SD	—	—	—
2016–17	76	34	37	1	4	73	.480	224	265	7th, Pacific	2017	Did not qualify				
2017–18	76	38	24	8	6	90	.592	223	231	2nd, Pacific	2018	—	W, 3–1, ONT	W, 4–1, TUC	W, 4–2, RFD	L, 3–4, TOR
2018–19	76	37	31	4	4	82	.539	238	231	6th, Central	2019	Did not qualify				
2019–20	62	27	28	3	4	61	.492	171	192	6th, Central	2020	Season cancelled due to the COVID-19 pandemic				
2020–21	38	17	18	3	0	37	.487	117	124	5th, Central	2021	No playoffs were held				
2021–22	72	32	28	6	6	76	.528	219	230	5th, Central	2022	L, 0–2, RFD	—	—	—	—
2022–23	72	40	20	9	3	92	.639	265	210	1st, Central	2023	BYE	W, 3–0, RFD	L, 2–3, MIL	—	—
2023–24	72	33	33	4	2	72	.500	234	240	4th, Central	2024	W, 2–0, MB	L, 2–3, MIL	—	—	—
2024–25	72	43	26	3	0	89	.618	240	210	2nd, Central	2025	BYE	W, 3–0, GR	W, 3–2, MIL	L, 2–4, ABB	—
2025–26	72	37	29	4	2	80	.556	222	228	3rd, Central	2026	BYE	L, 2–3, CHI	—	—	—

== Players ==
=== Current roster ===
Updated November 9, 2026.

No.	Nat	Player	Pos	S/G	Age	Acquired	Birthplace	Contract
18	(United States)	Jack Anderson	D	L	23	2026	St. Louis, Missouri	Dallas
27	(United States)	Jack Becker	F	R	29	2024	Dellwood, Minnesota	Texas
3	(Canada)	Tristan Bertucci	D	L	21	2025	North York, Ontario	Dallas
7	(Canada)	Kyle Burroughs (A)	D	R	31	2026	Vancouver, British Columbia	Dallas
10	(Canada)	Justin Ertel	LW	L	23	2024	Kitchener, Ontario	Dallas
21	(Canada)	Christian Fitzgerald	C	L	24	2026	Coquitlam, British Columbia	Dallas
6	(United States)	Ben Gleason	D	L	28	2026	Ortonville, Michigan	Texas
31	(United States)	Brandon Halverson	G	L	30	2026	Traverse City, Michigan	Dallas
39	(Finland)	Emil Hemming	RW	R	20	2025	Vaasa, Finland	Dallas
14	(Canada)	Dylan Hryckowian	RW	R	22	2026	L'Île-Bizard, Quebec	Dallas
19	(Canada)	Cameron Hughes (A)	C	L	30	2024	Edmonton, Alberta	Dallas
4	(United States)	Luke Krys	D	R	26	2024	Ridgefield, Connecticut	Dallas
37	(United States)	Kyle Looft	D	L	28	2024	Mankato, Minnesota	Texas
20	(Canada)	Ayrton Martino	LW	L	24	2025	Toronto, Ontario	Dallas
16	(Canada)	Curtis McKenzie (C)	LW	L	35	2021	Golden, British Columbia	Texas
15	(United States)	Aram Minnetian	D	R	21	2026	Woodcliff Lake, New Jersey	Dallas
36	(Canada)	Charlie Paquette	RW	R	24	2026	Essex, Ontario	Texas
24	(Canada)	Connor Punnett	D	L	23	2025	North Bay, Ontario	Dallas
29	(Canada)	Ellis Rickwood	C	R	24	2026	Brantford, Ontario	Texas
11	(United States)	Harrison Scott	C	L	26	2025	San Jose, California	Dallas
13	(Canada)	Matthew Seminoff	RW	R	22	2023	Leesburg, Virginia	Dallas
17	(Canada)	Mike Sgarbossa (A)	C	L	34	2026	Campbellville, Ontario	Texas
38	(United States)	Artem Shlaine	C	L	24	2025	Moscow, Russia	Dallas
2	(Canada)	Trey Taylor	D	L	24	2025	Richmond, British Columbia	Dallas
30	(Germany)	Arno Tiefensee	G	L	24	2025	Weißwasser, Germany	Dallas

=== Team captains ===
- Landon Wilson, 2009–2010
- Brad Lukowich, 2010–2012
- Maxime Fortunus, 2012–2015
- Travis Morin, 2015–2017
- Curtis McKenzie, 2017–2018, 2021–present
- Justin Dowling, 2018–2019
- Dillon Heatherington, 2019–2020
- Cole Schneider, 2021

=== Retired numbers ===
Texas Stars retired numbers
No.	Player	Position	Career	No. retirement
23	Travis Morin	C	2009–2019	October 19, 2019

=== Notable alumni ===
The following players have played both 100 games for Texas and 100 games in the National Hockey League:

- Gavin Bayreuther
- Jordie Benn
- Jack Campbell
- Jason Dickinson
- Brenden Dillon
- Justin Dowling
- Remi Elie
- Luke Gazdic
- Denis Gurianov
- Joel Hanley
- Tanner Kero
- Brad Lukowich
- Curtis McKenzie
- Patrik Nemeth
- Jamie Oleksiak
- Toby Petersen
- Alex Petrovic
- Brett Ritchie
- Colton Sceviour

=== Head coaches ===
- Glen Gulutzan, 2009–2011
- Jeff Pyle, 2011–2012
- Willie Desjardins, 2012–2014
- Derek Laxdal, 2014–2019
- Neil Graham, 2019–2025
- Toby Petersen, 2025–present

== Team records ==
Single season
Goals: Matěj Blümel, 39 (2024–25)
Assists: Travis Morin, 56 (2013–14)
Points: Travis Morin, 88 (2013–14)
Penalty Minutes: Luke Gazdic, 155 (2009–10)
GAA: Richard Bachman, 2.20 (2010–11)
SV%: Richard Bachman, .927 (2010–11)
Wins: Richard Bachman, 28 (2010–11)
Shutouts: Richard Bachman, 6 (2010–11)

- Goaltending records need a minimum 25 games played by the goaltender

Career
Career goals: Travis Morin, 175
Career assists: Travis Morin, 385
Career points: Travis Morin, 560
Career penalty minutes: Luke Gazdic, 447
Career goaltending wins: Jack Campbell, 66
Career shutouts: Richard Bachman, Jack Campbell, 9
Career games: Travis Morin, 686
