= Neil Graham =

- Born: April 21, 1985 (age 41) Calgary, Alberta, Canada
- Position: Forward
- Shot: Left
- Played for: Augusta RiverHawks; South Carolina Stingrays; Greenville Road Warriors; Idaho Steelheads
- Current NHL coach: Dallas Stars
- Coached for: Texas Stars
- NHL draft: Undrafted
- Playing career: 2010–2013

Neil Graham (born April 21, 1985) is a Canadian professional ice hockey coach and former player who is a current assistant coach for the Dallas Stars of the National Hockey League (NHL) and served as head coach of the Texas Stars of the American Hockey League (AHL) from 2019-2025. He briefly played professionally and began coaching in 2012 as a player-coach for the Idaho Steelheads of the ECHL. He was an assistant coach for the Steelheads, later promoted to head coach, and also served as an assistant with the Texas Stars before being promoted to head coach in 2019. In 2025 he was moved to an assistant coaching position for the Dallas Stars.

== Early life ==
Graham was born on April 21, 1985, in Calgary, Alberta. He grew up playing ice hockey and competed in low-level leagues near his home. From 2003 to 2006, he played in the Alberta Junior Hockey League. He scored 14 points with the Crowsnest Pass Timberwolves in 2003–04, 47 points with the Brooks Bandits in 2004–05, and 48 points with the Okotoks Oilers in 2005–06. He was the Oilers' leading scorer in his one season there and was a league all-star selection.

Graham played hockey in college at Mercyhurst College in Pennsylvania. As a freshman in 2006–07, he played in 30 games and scored 11 points. He scored 13 points in 34 games in 2007–08, 16 points in 37 games in 2008–09, and 20 points in 36 games as a senior in 2009–10. He finished his collegiate career with 23 goals in 137 games played.

Afterwards, Graham began playing professionally with the Augusta RiverHawks of the Southern Professional Hockey League (SPHL) in 2010–11. He scored 54 points in 49 games with the RiverHawks and also played a total of 10 games in the ECHL, splitting it with the South Carolina Stingrays and Greenville Road Warriors. He joined the Idaho Steelheads of the ECHL in 2012–13 as a coach, but due to player shortages also appeared in some games as a player-coach. A concussion with the Steelheads ended his playing career.

== Coaching career ==
Graham served as assistant coach to Brad Ralph with the Steelheads during the 2013–14 and 2014–15 seasons. After Ralph left in 2015, he asked general manager Eric Trapp to consider Graham as his successor. After Graham interviewed, he was immediately hired to the position: Trapp said "He hit it out of the park, and I didn’t even bother interviewing anybody else because I knew he was our guy". Aged 30 at his promotion, he became the youngest head coach in the ECHL as well as the youngest in team history, compiling a record of 38–24–10 in his first season. Idaho reached the playoffs in all four of Graham's years with the team, before he left in 2019 to become an assistant coach with the Texas Stars of the American Hockey League (AHL), finishing his ECHL tenure with a record of 166–91–31.

During his first season with the Stars, Graham was promoted to head coach after Derek Laxdal was promoted to assistant with the Dallas Stars, replacing the fired Jim Montgomery. He won his first game the day after his promotion and the Stars finished the season with a record of 18–15–2–2. In his third season, Graham helped them qualify for the playoffs, their first appearance since 2018. In 2022–23, he helped them win the Central Division title, their first division championship since 2014. The Stars compiled a record of 33–33–6 in 2023–24 and then went 43–26–3 in 2024–25, reaching the conference final. In 2025, it was reported he would be taking an assistant coaching position with the Dallas Stars under new head coach Glen Gulutzan.
