= 2025–26 AHL season =

- League: American Hockey League
- Sport: Ice hockey
- Duration: October 10, 2025 – April 19, 2026

Regular season
- Macgregor Kilpatrick Trophy: Providence Bruins
- Season MVP: Michael DiPietro (Providence Bruins)
- Top scorer: Jakob Pelletier (Syracuse Crunch)

Playoffs
- Playoffs MVP: Artur Akhtyamov (Toronto)

Calder Cup
- Champions: Toronto Marlies
- Runners-up: Chicago Wolves

AHL seasons
- 2024–25 2026–27

The 2025–26 AHL season was the 90th season of the American Hockey League. The regular season began on October 10, 2025, and ended on April 19, 2026. The 2026 Calder Cup playoffs followed the conclusion of the regular season and ended on June 19, 2026, with the Toronto Marlies winning their second Calder Cup and first since 2018.

== League changes ==
=== Coaching changes ===
Off–season
Team	2024–25 coach	2025–26 coach	Notes
Rockford IceHogs	Anders Sorensen; Mark Eaton (interim)	Jared Nightingale	On May 30, 2025, Nightingale was hired as head coach of the IceHogs, having previously served assistant coach from 2021 through 2024.
Calgary Wranglers	Trent Cull; Joe Cirella (interim)	Brett Sutter	On December 27, 2024, Cull was called up to serve as assistant coach for the Calgary Flames on an interim basis. He was named full-time assistant coach on May 30, 2025. Following Cull's official promotion, on June 20, Sutter was named head coach of the Wranglers.
Iowa Wild	Brett McLean	Greg Cronin	Following the 2024–25 NHL season, McLean was named to the coaching staff of Vancouver's Adam Foote. Cronin was named as head coach of the Wild on June 23, 2025.
Bridgeport Islanders	Rick Kowalsky	Rocky Thompson	Kowalsky was relieved as head coach of the Islanders on May 29, 2025. Former Philadelphia Flyers assistant coach Rocky Thompson was hired as his replacement on June 23.
Colorado Eagles	Aaron Schneekloth	Mark Letestu	On June 17, 2025, Schneekloth was hired as an assistant coach for the Seattle Kraken. Letestu, who had previously served as assistant coach for the Cleveland Monsters, was hired by the Eagles on July 5.
Texas Stars	Neil Graham	Toby Petersen	Following the 2024–25 season NHL season, Graham was promoted to assistant coach with the Dallas Stars. Former Texas and Dallas Star Toby Petersen was named head coach on July 7.
Ontario Reign	Marco Sturm	Andrew Lord	Sturm was hired as head coach of the Boston Bruins on June 5, 2025. Following this, on July 11, Ontario hired Andrew Lord as his replacement.
Lehigh Valley Phantoms	Ian Laperriere	John Snowden	Former Phantoms assistant coach John Snowden was named head coach on July 8, 2025, following Laperriere's transition to an advisory role within the Philadelphia Flyers' hockey operations department.
Hershey Bears	Todd Nelson	Derek King	Nelson was named as an assistant coach of the Pittsburgh Penguins on June 20, 2025. Derek King was named his replacement as head coach for Hershey on August 4.
In–season
Team	Outgoing coach	Incoming coach	Notes
Chicago Wolves	Cam Abbott	Spiros Anastas (interim)	Abbott was fired as head coach of the Wolves on December 12, 2025, with Anastas being named interim head coach.
Belleville Senators	David Bell	Andrew Campbell (interim)	Bell was fired as head coach of the Senators on December 17, 2025, with Campbell being named interim head coach.
Springfield Thunderbirds	Steve Konowalchuk	Steve Ott	Konowalchuk was fired as head coach of the Thunderbirds on January 19, 2026, with Ott being named head coach for the remainder of the season.

== Standings ==
z– Macgregor Kilpatrick Trophy (regular season champion)
y– indicates team has clinched division and a playoff spot
x– indicates team has clinched a playoff spot
e– indicates team has been eliminated from playoff contention

Standings as of games through April 19, 2026

=== Eastern Conference ===
Atlantic Division	GP	W	L	OTL	SOL	Pts	Pts%	GF	GA
z– Providence Bruins (BOS)	72	54	16	2	0	110	.764	239	162
x–Wilkes-Barre/Scranton Penguins (PIT)	72	46	17	7	2	101	.701	243	186
x–Charlotte Checkers (FLA)	72	44	23	5	0	93	.646	238	187
x–Bridgeport Islanders (NYI)	72	34	30	3	5	76	.528	219	222
x–Hershey Bears (WSH)	72	32	31	6	3	73	.507	210	230
x–Springfield Thunderbirds (STL)	72	32	32	6	2	72	.500	207	240
e–Lehigh Valley Phantoms (PHI)	72	31	35	3	3	68	.472	210	247
e–Hartford Wolf Pack (NYR)	72	26	38	5	3	60	.417	190	253

North Division	GP	W	L	OTL	SOL	Pts	Pts%	GF	GA
y–Laval Rocket (MTL)	72	41	23	3	5	90	.625	233	200
x–Syracuse Crunch (TBL)	72	41	24	3	4	89	.618	237	189
x–Cleveland Monsters (CBJ)	72	37	26	6	3	83	.576	217	227
x–Toronto Marlies (TOR)	72	36	26	5	5	82	.569	229	228
x–Rochester Americans (BUF)	72	31	31	6	4	72	.500	214	235
e–Utica Comets (NJD)	72	30	31	6	5	71	.493	199	220
e–Belleville Senators (OTT)	72	28	35	8	1	65	.451	223	262

=== Western Conference ===
Central Division	GP	W	L	OTL	SOL	Pts	Pts%	GF	GA
y–Grand Rapids Griffins (DET)	72	51	16	4	1	107	.743	255	159
x–Chicago Wolves (CAR)	72	36	21	8	7	87	.604	225	218
x–Texas Stars (DAL)	72	37	29	4	2	80	.556	222	228
x–Manitoba Moose (WPG)	72	35	29	5	3	78	.536	185	216
x–Milwaukee Admirals (NSH)	72	32	33	4	3	71	.493	206	221
e–Iowa Wild (MIN)	72	27	36	6	3	63	.438	179	226
e–Rockford IceHogs (CHI)	72	28	39	3	2	61	.424	196	245

Pacific Division	GP	W	L	OTL	SOL	Pts	Pts%	GF	GA
y–Ontario Reign (LAK)	72	47	20	3	2	99	.688	237	187
x–Colorado Eagles (COL)	72	41	20	6	5	93	.646	237	198
x–Henderson Silver Knights (VGK)	72	39	21	7	5	90	.625	263	225
x–Coachella Valley Firebirds (SEA)	72	41	25	6	0	88	.611	235	218
x–Bakersfield Condors (EDM)	72	37	23	11	1	86	.597	244	236
x–San Jose Barracuda (SJS)	72	40	28	2	2	84	.583	243	230
x–San Diego Gulls (ANA)	72	33	27	8	4	78	.542	224	228
e–Tucson Roadrunners (UTA)	72	34	28	10	0	78	.542	230	239
e–Abbotsford Canucks (VAN)	72	28	37	4	3	63	.438	173	234
e–Calgary Wranglers (CGY)	72	23	34	10	5	61	.424	203	269

== Statistical leaders ==
=== Scoring leaders ===
These are the top ten skaters based on points. If there is a tie in points, goals take precedence over assists; if there is a tie in goals, players with fewer games played take precedence over those with more. Updated following games played on April 19, 2026.

GP = Games played; G = Goals; A = Assists; Pts = Points; +/– = P Plus–minus; PIM = Penalty minutes

Player	Team	GP	G	A	Pts	PIM
Jakob Pelletier	Syracuse Crunch	63	28	49	77	19
Alex Barré-Boulet	Colorado Eagles	70	26	44	70	30
Arthur Kaliyev	Belleville Senators	70	40	28	68	30
Cameron Hughes	Texas Stars	65	17	51	68	48
Seth Griffith	Bakersfield Condors	71	18	49	67	50
Ilya Protas	Hershey Bears	69	29	37	66	40
Felix Unger Sörum	Chicago Wolves	72	17	49	66	20
Tanner Laczynski	Henderson Silver Knights	62	22	42	64	35
Quinn Hutson	Bakersfield Condors	67	30	33	63	84
Konsta Helenius	Rochester Americans	63	21	42	63	22

=== Leading goaltenders ===
This is a combined table of the top five goaltenders based on goals against average and the top five goaltenders based on save percentage with at least 1,440 minutes played. The table is initially sorted by goals against average, with the criterion for inclusion in bold. Updated following games played on April 19, 2026.

GP = Games played; TOI = Time on ice (in minutes); SA = Shots against; GA = Goals against; SO = Shutouts; GAA = Goals against average; SV% = Save percentage; W = Wins; L = Losses; OT = Overtime/shootout loss

Player	Team	GP	TOI	SA	GA	SO	GAA	SV%	W	L	OT
Michael DiPietro	Providence Bruins	45	2,644:29	1,202	84	3	**1.91**	**.930**	34	8	1
Carl Lindbom	Henderson Silver Knights	35	2,055:57	994	74	3	**2.16**	**.926**	24	5	5
Sergei Murashov	Wilkes-Barre/Scranton Penguins	38	2,153:50	980	79	4	**2.20**	**.919**	24	9	4
Jacob Fowler	Laval Rocket	27	1,617:44	717	60	3	**2.23**	**.916**	19	7	1
Sebastian Cossa	Grand Rapids Griffins	39	2,292:25	1,053	89	5	**2.33**	.915	26	8	4
Cayden Primeau	Chicago Wolves	39	2,366:53	1,127	95	4	2.41	**.916**	21	11	7

== Calder Cup playoffs ==
=== Playoff format ===
The AHL will continue to use the same playoff format used since 2022. The playoff field will include the top six finishers in the eight-team Atlantic Division, the top five finishers each in the seven-team North and Central Divisions, and the top seven teams in the 10-team Pacific Division. First Round match-ups will be best-of-three series; the two highest seeds in the Atlantic, the three highest seeds in each of the North and Central, and the first-place team in the Pacific will receive byes into the best-of-five Division Semifinals, with the First Round winners re-seeded in each division. The Division Finals will also be best-of-five series, followed by best-of-seven Conference Finals and a best-of-seven Calder Cup Finals series.

=== Bracket ===
First Round; April 21–26
A3	Charlotte	1
A6	Springfield	2
A4	Bridgeport	0
A5	Hershey	2
N4	Toronto	2
N5	Rochester	1
C4	Manitoba	2
C5	Milwaukee	1
P2	Colorado	2
P7	San Diego	0
P3	Henderson	2
P6	San Jose	0
P4	Coachella Valley	2
P5	Bakersfield	1

Division Semifinals; April 24 – May 9
A1	Providence	1
A6	Springfield	3
Atlantic Division
A2	Wilkes-Barre/Scranton	3
A5	Hershey	1
N1	Laval	2
N4	Toronto	3
North Division
N2	Syracuse	1
N3	Cleveland	3
C1	Grand Rapids	3
C4	Manitoba	1
Central Division
C2	Chicago	3
C3	Texas	2
P1	Ontario	2
P4	Coachella Valley	3
Pacific Division
P2	Colorado	3
P3	Henderson	1

Division Finals; May 12–24
A6	Springfield	2
A2	Wilkes-Barre/Scranton	3
Eastern Conference
N4	Toronto	3
N3	Cleveland	2
C1	Grand Rapids	1
C2	Chicago	3
Western Conference
P4	Coachella Valley	1
P2	Colorado	3

Conference Finals; May 27 – June 8
A2	Wilkes-Barre/Scranton	2
N4	Toronto	4
C2	Chicago	4
P2	Colorado	3

Calder Cup Finals; June 12–19
N4	Toronto	4
C2	Chicago	1

== AHL awards ==
Award	Winner	Ref
Calder Cup (Playoff champions)	Toronto Marlies	
Les Cunningham Award (Regular season MVP)	Michael DiPietro, Providence Bruins	
John B. Sollenberger Trophy (Regular season points leader)	Jakob Pelletier, Syracuse Crunch	
Willie Marshall Award (Regular season goalscoring leader)	Arthur Kaliyev, Belleville Senators	
Dudley "Red" Garrett Memorial Award (Rookie of the year)	Ilya Protas, Hershey Bears	
Eddie Shore Award (Defenceman of the year)	Zac Jones, Rochester Americans	
Aldege "Baz" Bastien Memorial Award (Goaltender of the year)	Trent Miner, Colorado Eagles	
Harry "Hap" Holmes Memorial Award (Team with fewest goals against)	Sebastian Cossa & Michal Postava, Grand Rapids Griffins	
Louis A. R. Pieri Memorial Award (Coach of the year)	Mark Letestu, Colorado Eagles	
Fred T. Hunt Memorial Award (Sportsmanship, determination, and dedication to hockey)	Patrick Brown, Providence Bruins	
Yanick Dupré Memorial Award (Community service)	Tyrel Bauer, Manitoba Moose	
Jack A. Butterfield Trophy (Playoff MVP)	Artur Akhtyamov, Toronto Marlies	
Richard F. Canning Trophy (Eastern Conference playoff champions)	Toronto Marlies	
Robert W. Clarke Trophy (Western Conference playoff champions)	Chicago Wolves	
Macgregor Kilpatrick Trophy (Regular season champions)	Providence Bruins	
Frank Mathers Trophy (Atlantic Division regular season champions)	Providence Bruins	
F. G. "Teddy" Oke Trophy (North Division regular season champions)	Laval Rocket	
Sam Pollock Trophy (Central Division regular season champions)	Grand Rapids Griffins	
John D. Chick Trophy (Pacific Division regular season champions)	Ontario Reign	
James C. Hendy Memorial Award (Executive of the year)	Mike Ostrowski, Cleveland Monsters	
Thomas Ebright Memorial Award (Career contributions to the AHL)	Jon Greenberg, Milwaukee Admirals	
Bruce Landon Award (Outstanding hockey operations executive)	Mark Bernard, Rockford IceHogs	
James H. Ellery Memorial Award (Outstanding media coverage)		
Ken McKenzie Award (Marketing and public relations)	Ryan Holt, Bakersfield Condors	
Michael Condon Memorial Award (On-ice official)	Jarrod Ragusin	
David Andrews Awards of Excellence (Overall excellence by a player and a team)	Logan Shaw, Toronto Marlies (player); Colorado Eagles (team)	

=== All-Star teams ===
First All-Star Team

- Michael DiPietro (G) – Providence Bruins
- Jack Ahcan (D) – Colorado Eagles
- Zac Jones (D) – Rochester Americans
- Alex Barré-Boulet (F) – Colorado Eagles
- Arthur Kaliyev (F) – Belleville Senators
- Jakob Pelletier (F) – Syracuse Crunch

Second All-Star Team

- Carl Lindbom (G) – Henderson Silver Knights
- Lukas Cormier (D) – Henderson Silver Knights
- Ryan Ufko (D) – Milwaukee Admirals
- Cameron Hughes (F) – Texas Stars
- Tanner Laczynski (F) – Henderson Silver Knights
- John Leonard (F) – Charlotte Checkers

All-Rookie Team

- Sergei Murashov (G) – Wilkes-Barre/Scranton Penguins
- Tyson Jugnauth (D) – Coachella Valley Firebirds
- Dmitriy Simashev (D) – Tucson Roadrunners
- Isaac Howard (F) – Bakersfield Condors
- Quinn Hutson (F) – Bakersfield Condors
- Ilya Protas (F) – Hershey Bears

Top Prospects Team

- Sergei Murashov (G) – Wilkes-Barre/Scranton Penguins
- Adam Engstrom (D) – Laval Rocket
- Carter Yakemchuk (D) – Belleville Senators
- Michael Brandsegg-Nygard (F) – Grand Rapids Griffins
- Konsta Helenius (F) – Rochester Americans
- Ilya Protas (F) – Hershey Bears
