= 2023–24 AHL season =

- League: American Hockey League
- Sport: Ice hockey
- Duration: October 13, 2023 – April 21, 2024

Regular season
- Macgregor Kilpatrick Trophy: Hershey Bears
- Season MVP: Mavrik Bourque (Texas Stars)
- Top scorer: Mavrik Bourque (Texas Stars)

Playoffs
- Playoffs MVP: Hendrix Lapierre (Hershey)

Calder Cup
- Champions: Hershey Bears
- Runners-up: Coachella Valley Firebirds

AHL seasons
- 2022–23 2024–25

The 2023–24 AHL season was the 88th season of the American Hockey League. The regular season began on October 13, 2023, and ended on April 21, 2024. The 2024 Calder Cup playoffs followed the conclusion of the regular season, and ended on June 24, with the Hershey Bears winning their 13th Calder Cup in franchise history.

== League changes ==
For the first time since the 1994–95 season, the league featured an unaffiliated team, with the Chicago Wolves ending their affiliation with the Carolina Hurricanes. It only lasted one season; the two clubs announced on May 2, 2024, a new three-year agreement where the Wolves would rejoin the Hurricanes' system.

=== Team and NHL affiliation changes ===
AHL team	New affiliate	Previous affiliate
Chicago Wolves	Independent	Carolina Hurricanes

=== Coaching changes ===
Off–season
Team	2022–23 coach	2023–24 coach	Notes
Belleville Senators	Troy Mann; David Bell (interim)	David Bell	On February 2, 2023, following the Senators game vs the Rochester Americans, Mann was relieved from duties as head coach. Assistant coach David Bell was named as interim head coach the same night. Ottawa removed the interim tag from Bell for the 2023–24 season on May 2, 2023.
Bridgeport Islanders	Brent Thompson	Rick Kowalsky	On July 11, 2023, Thompson was named as an assistant coach with the Anaheim Ducks. Bridgeport assistant coach Rick Kowalsky was named as head coach on July 13, 2023.
Calgary Wranglers	Mitch Love	Trent Cull	The Washington Capitals hired Love as an assistant coach on June 22, 2023. Cull was hired by the Wranglers on July 17, 2023.
Chicago Wolves	Brock Sheahan	Bob Nardella	On June 13, 2023, with the Wolves operation without an NHL affiliate, they hired Nardella as head coach.
Colorado Eagles	Greg Cronin	Aaron Schneekloth	On June 5, 2023, Cronin was hired as the head coach of the Anaheim Ducks. Schneekloth was named as head coach of the Eagles on July 6, 2023.
Grand Rapids Griffins	Ben Simon	Dan Watson	Shortly following the conclusion of the season, the Griffins parted ways with Simon. Watson was named as head coach of the Griffins on June 14, 2023.
Henderson Silver Knights	Manny Viveiros	Ryan Craig	On April 19, 2023, the Golden Knights and Viveiros mutually agreed to part ways. Golden Knights assistant coach Ryan Craig was named as head coach of the Silver Knights on June 26, 2023.
Iowa Wild	Tim Army	Brett McLean	On April 22, 2023, the Wild fired most of their coaching staff, including Army. McLean was named as Iowa Wild head coach after spending three seasons as an assistant coach with Minnesota.
San Diego Gulls	Roy Sommer	Matt McIlvane	On April 15, 2023, Sommer had announced he intended to retire following the season. On April 25, the Gulls hired McIlvane as head coach.
Syracuse Crunch	Benoit Groulx	Joel Bouchard	On June 26, 2023, Bouchard was named as head coach of the Crunch. Groulx was offered a different position in the Lightning organization.
Toronto Marlies	Greg Moore	John Gruden	On May 19, 2023, shortly after the Marlies were swept by Rochester in the division finals, the Marlies announced they would not renew the contract of Moore. Gruden was named as head coach of the Marlies on July 4, 2023.
In-season
Team	Outgoing coach	Incoming coach	Notes
Hartford Wolf Pack	Kris Knoblauch	Steve Smith (interim)	After the Edmonton Oilers fired head coach Jay Woodcroft on November 12, 2023, Knoblauch was named as head coach of the Oilers. On the same day, the Wolf Pack named Smith as interim head coach.
Springfield Thunderbirds	Drew Bannister	Daniel Tkaczuk (interim)	After the St. Louis Blues fired head coach Craig Berube on December 12, 2023, Bannister was named as head coach of the Blues and Tkaczuk was elevated to interim head coach of the Thunderbirds.

== Standings ==
y– indicates team has clinched division and a playoff spot
x– indicates team has clinched a playoff spot
e– indicates team has been eliminated from playoff contention

Standings as of April 21, 2024

=== Eastern Conference ===
Atlantic Division	GP	W	L	OTL	SOL	Pts	Pts%	GF	GA
y–Hershey Bears (WSH)	72	53	14	0	5	111	.771	229	151
x–Providence Bruins (BOS)	72	42	21	6	3	93	.646	239	208
x–Wilkes-Barre/Scranton Penguins (PIT)	72	39	24	8	1	87	.604	211	194
x–Charlotte Checkers (FLA)	72	39	26	7	0	85	.590	217	203
x–Hartford Wolf Pack (NYR)	72	34	28	7	3	78	.542	204	219
x–Lehigh Valley Phantoms (PHI)	72	32	31	6	3	73	.507	191	217
e–Springfield Thunderbirds (STL)	72	30	37	3	2	65	.451	226	244
e–Bridgeport Islanders (NYI)	72	25	38	7	2	59	.410	162	222

North Division	GP	W	L	OTL	SOL	Pts	Pts%	GF	GA
y–Cleveland Monsters (CBJ)	72	40	24	5	3	88	.611	233	238
x–Rochester Americans (BUF)	72	39	23	7	3	88	.611	234	239
x–Syracuse Crunch (TBL)	72	39	24	4	5	87	.604	220	203
x–Belleville Senators (OTT)	72	38	28	3	3	82	.569	209	211
x–Toronto Marlies (TOR)	72	34	26	10	2	80	.556	249	220
e–Utica Comets (NJD)	72	32	29	5	6	75	.521	221	226
e–Laval Rocket (MTL)	72	33	31	6	2	74	.514	235	242

=== Western Conference ===
Central Division	GP	W	L	OTL	SOL	Pts	Pts%	GF	GA
y–Milwaukee Admirals (NSH)	72	47	22	2	1	97	.674	238	193
x–Grand Rapids Griffins (DET)	72	37	23	8	4	86	.597	208	202
x–Rockford IceHogs (CHI)	72	39	26	5	2	85	.590	215	208
x–Texas Stars (DAL)	72	33	33	4	2	72	.500	234	240
x–Manitoba Moose (WPG)	72	34	35	2	1	71	.493	225	243
e–Iowa Wild (MIN)	72	27	37	4	4	62	.431	184	245
e–Chicago Wolves (independent)	72	23	35	7	7	60	.417	192	253

Pacific Division	GP	W	L	OTL	SOL	Pts	Pts%	GF	GA
y–Coachella Valley Firebirds (SEA)	72	46	15	6	5	103	.715	252	182
x–Tucson Roadrunners (UTA)	72	43	23	4	2	92	.639	222	214
x–Ontario Reign (LAK)	72	42	23	3	4	91	.632	231	198
x–Colorado Eagles (COL)	72	40	25	5	2	87	.604	215	195
x–Abbotsford Canucks (VAN)	72	40	25	5	2	87	.604	234	210
x–Bakersfield Condors (EDM)	72	39	27	4	2	84	.583	223	202
x–Calgary Wranglers (CGY)	72	35	28	6	3	79	.549	203	212
e–Henderson Silver Knights (VGK)	72	28	36	3	5	64	.444	190	243
e–San Diego Gulls (ANA)	72	26	35	10	1	63	.438	216	245
e–San Jose Barracuda (SJS)	72	24	34	10	4	62	.431	220	260

== Statistical leaders ==
=== Leading skaters ===
The following players are sorted by points, then goals. As of April 21, 2024.

GP = Games played; G = Goals; A = Assists; Pts = Points; +/– = P Plus–minus; PIM = Penalty minutes

Player	Team	GP	G	A	Pts	PIM
Mavrik Bourque	Texas Stars	71	26	51	77	32
Rocco Grimaldi	Chicago Wolves	72	36	37	73	38
Adam Gaudette	Springfield Thunderbirds	67	44	27	71	51
T. J. Tynan	Ontario Reign	71	9	57	66	68
Georgii Merkulov	Providence Bruins	67	30	35	65	20
Kole Lind	Coachella Valley Firebirds	69	17	48	65	65
Andrew Agozzino	San Diego Gulls	72	26	38	64	44
Brett Seney	Rockford IceHogs	68	23	40	63	60
Seth Griffith	Bakersfield Condors	68	15	48	63	32
Samuel Fagemo	Ontario Reign	50	43	19	62	26

=== Leading goaltenders ===
The following goaltenders with a minimum 1,440 minutes played lead the league in goals against average. As of April 21, 2024.

GP = Games played; TOI = Time on ice (in minutes); SA = Shots against; GA = Goals against; SO = Shutouts; GAA = Goals against average; SV% = Save percentage; W = Wins; L = Losses; OT = Overtime/shootout loss

Player	Team	GP	TOI	SA	GA	SO	GAA	SV%	W	L	OT
Hunter Shepard	Hershey Bears	34	2,075:41	860	61	5	1.76	.929	27	4	3
Clay Stevenson	Hershey Bears	36	2,159:20	951	74	7	2.06	.922	24	10	2
Joel Blomqvist	Wilkes-Barre/Scranton Penguins	45	2,636:20	1,197	95	1	2.16	.921	25	12	6
Chris Driedger	Coachella Valley Firebirds	39	2,282:35	1,038	86	4	2.26	.917	24	7	7
Yaroslav Askarov	Milwaukee Admirals	44	2,556:55	1,148	102	6	2.39	.911	30	13	1

== Calder Cup playoffs ==
=== Playoff format ===
The AHL will continue to use the same playoff format used in the previous playoffs. The playoff field will include the top six finishers in the eight-team Atlantic Division, the top five finishers each in the seven-team North and Central Divisions, and the top seven teams in the 10-team Pacific Division. First Round match-ups will be best-of-three series; the two highest seeds in the Atlantic, the three highest seeds in each of the North and Central, and the first-place team in the Pacific will receive byes into the best-of-five Division Semifinals, with the First Round winners re-seeded in each division. The Division Finals will also be best-of-five series, followed by best-of-seven Conference Finals and a best-of-seven Calder Cup Finals series.

=== Bracket ===
First Round; April 23–28
A3	Wilkes-Barre/Scranton	0
A6	Lehigh Valley	2
A4	Charlotte	1
A5	Hartford	2
N4	Belleville	2
N5	Toronto	1
C4	Texas	2
C5	Manitoba	0
P2	Tucson	0
P7	Calgary	2
P3	Ontario	2
P6	Bakersfield	0
P4	Colorado	1
P5	Abbotsford	2

Division Semifinals; April 26–May 12
A1	Hershey	3
A6	Lehigh Valley	1
Atlantic Division
A2	Providence	1
A5	Hartford	3
N1	Cleveland	3
N4	Belleville	1
North Division
N2	Rochester	1
N3	Syracuse	3
C1	Milwaukee	3
C4	Texas	2
Central Division
C2	Grand Rapids	3
C3	Rockford	1
P1	Coachella Valley	3
P7	Calgary	1
Pacific Division
P3	Ontario	3
P5	Abbotsford	0

Division Finals; May 15–May 26
A1	Hershey	3
A5	Hartford	0
Eastern Conference
N1	Cleveland	3
N3	Syracuse	0
C1	Milwaukee	3
C2	Grand Rapids	2
Western Conference
P1	Coachella Valley	3
P3	Ontario	0

Conference Finals; May 29–June 12
A1	Hershey	4
N1	Cleveland	3
P1	Coachella Valley	4
C1	Milwaukee	1

Calder Cup Finals; June 14–24
A1	Hershey	4
P1	Coachella Valley	2

== AHL awards ==
Award	Winner
Calder Cup (Playoff champions)	Hershey Bears
Les Cunningham Award (Regular season MVP)	Mavrik Bourque, Texas Stars
John B. Sollenberger Trophy (Regular season points leader)	Mavrik Bourque, Texas Stars
Willie Marshall Award (Regular season goalscoring leader)	Adam Gaudette, Springfield Thunderbirds
Dudley "Red" Garrett Memorial Award (Rookie of the year)	Logan Stankoven, Texas Stars
Eddie Shore Award (Defenceman of the year)	Kyle Capobianco, Manitoba Moose
Aldege "Baz" Bastien Memorial Award (Goaltender of the year)	Hunter Shepard, Hershey Bears
Harry "Hap" Holmes Memorial Award (Team with fewest goals against)	Clay Stevenson & Hunter Shepard, Hershey Bears
Louis A. R. Pieri Memorial Award (Coach of the year)	Todd Nelson, Hershey Bears
Fred T. Hunt Memorial Award (Sportsmanship, determination, and dedication to hockey)	Spencer Knight, Charlotte Checkers
Yanick Dupre Memorial Award (Community service)	Daniel Walcott, Syracuse Crunch
Jack A. Butterfield Trophy (Playoff MVP)	Hendrix Lapierre, Hershey Bears
Richard F. Canning Trophy (Eastern Conference playoff champions)	Hershey Bears
Robert W. Clarke Trophy (Western Conference playoff champions)	Coachella Valley Firebirds
Macgregor Kilpatrick Trophy (Regular season champions)	Hershey Bears
Frank Mathers Trophy (Eastern Conference regular season champions)	Hershey Bears
Norman R. "Bud" Poile Trophy (Western Conference regular season champions)	Coachella Valley Firebirds
Emile Francis Trophy (Atlantic Division regular season champions)	Hershey Bears
F. G. "Teddy" Oke Trophy (North Division regular season champions)	Cleveland Monsters
Sam Pollock Trophy (Central Division regular season champions)	Milwaukee Admirals
John D. Chick Trophy (Pacific Division regular season champions)	Coachella Valley Firebirds
James C. Hendy Memorial Award (Executive of the year)	Bryan Helmer, Hershey Bears
Thomas Ebright Memorial Award (Career contributions to the AHL)	Vance Lederman, Syracuse Crunch
James H. Ellery Memorial Awards (Outstanding media coverage)	
Ken McKenzie Award (Marketing and public relations)	
Michael Condon Memorial Award (On-ice official)	Shaun Davis (referee)
President's Awards (Excellence in all areas of the ice)	Hershey Bears (team); Mavrik Bourque (player)

=== All-Star teams ===
First All-Star Team

- Hunter Shepard (G) – Hershey Bears
- Kyle Capobianco (D) – Manitoba Moose
- Brad Hunt (D) – Colorado Eagles
- Mavrik Bourque (F) – Texas Stars
- Adam Gaudette (F) – Springfield Thunderbirds
- Logan Stankoven (F) – Texas Stars

Second All-Star Team

- Joel Blomqvist (G) – Wilkes-Barre/Scranton Penguins
- Jake Christiansen (D) – Cleveland Monsters
- Brandt Clarke (D) – Ontario Reign
- Samuel Fagemo (F) – Ontario Reign
- Trey Fix-Wolansky (F) – Cleveland Monsters
- Rocco Grimaldi (F) – Chicago Wolves

All-Rookie Team

- Joel Blomqvist (G) – Wilkes-Barre/Scranton Penguins
- Brandt Clarke (D) – Ontario Reign
- Logan Mailloux (D) – Laval Rocket
- Josh Doan (F) – Tucson Roadrunners
- Brad Lambert (F) – Manitoba Moose
- Logan Stankoven (F) – Texas Stars
