= Lukas Cormier =

Canadian ice hockey player (born 2002)

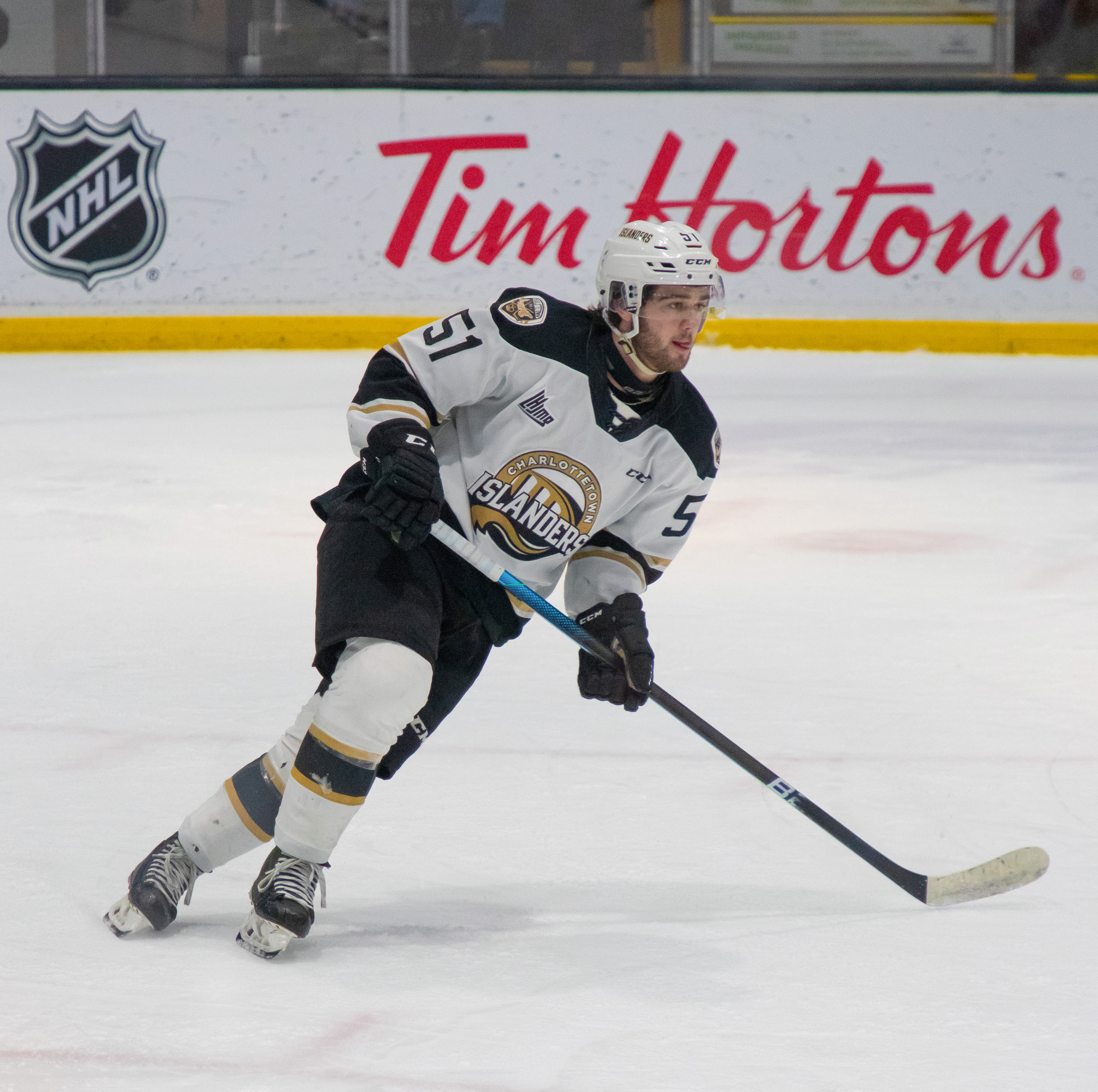
- Cormier with the Charlottetown Islanders in 2022
- Born: March 27, 2002 (age 24) Sainte-Marie-de-Kent, New Brunswick, Canada
- Height: 5 ft 10 in (178 cm)
- Weight: 184 lb (83 kg; 13 st 2 lb)
- Position: Defence
- Shoots: Left
- NHL team (P) Cur. team: Vegas Golden Knights; Henderson Silver Knights (AHL)
- NHL draft: 68th overall, 2020; Vegas Golden Knights
- Playing career: 2022–present

Lukas Cormier (born March 27, 2002) is a Canadian professional ice hockey defenceman for the Henderson Silver Knights of the American Hockey League (AHL) while under contract to the Vegas Golden Knights of the National Hockey League (NHL).

== Playing career ==
Cormier was drafted 68th overall by the Golden Knights in the third round of the 2020 NHL entry draft, signing his three-year entry-level contract on December 31, 2020, and played junior hockey with the Charlottetown Islanders of the QMJHL. Cormier experienced a breakout season in 2020–21 season, winning the Emile Bouchard Trophy as the league's best defenseman, and being named to the season's First All-Star Team. Cormier repeated both feats in 2021–22 season, additionally leading the league in both goals and points by a defenseman, and helping the Islanders to the President's Cup Finals, where they ultimately lost to the Shawinigan Cataractes.

Cormier made his NHL debut with Vegas on January 6, 2024, recording an assist on a third-period Jack Eichel power-play goal for his first NHL point.

Cormier made his 2024–25 season debut in the AHL on March 1, 2025, following a long-term injury. Following the season, as a restricted free agent, Cormier signed a one-year extension with Vegas on July 8, 2025. Cormier signed an additional one-year extension on July 6, 2026.

== International play ==
Medal record

Representing Canada

Ice hockey

World Junior Championships
Gold medal – first place	2022 Canada	

Cormier made his international debut with Canada Red at the 2018 World U-17 Hockey Challenge, recording no points across six games. He also appeared for the Canadian under-18 team in the 2019 Hlinka Gretzky Cup, winning a silver medal. Cormier later won a gold medal with Canada at the 2022 IIHF World Junior Championships, recording 5 points in 7 games.

== Personal life ==
Cormier's sister Dominique played for the Princeton Tigers women's ice hockey team of the ECAC, after having represented Canada in U18 tournaments.

== Career statistics ==
=== Regular season and playoffs ===
			Regular season					Playoffs
Season	Team	League	GP	G	A	Pts	PIM	GP	G	A	Pts	PIM
2018–19	Charlottetown Islanders	QMJHL	63	15	21	36	46	6	1	4	5	0
2019–20	Charlottetown Islanders	QMJHL	44	6	30	36	28	—	—	—	—	—
2020–21	Charlottetown Islanders	QMJHL	39	16	38	54	36	8	2	7	9	6
2021–22	Charlottetown Islanders	QMJHL	62	33	48	81	60	15	8	13	21	14
2022–23	Henderson Silver Knights	AHL	62	10	25	35	44	—	—	—	—	—
2023–24	Henderson Silver Knights	AHL	58	4	16	20	33	—	—	—	—	—
2023–24	Vegas Golden Knights	NHL	2	0	1	1	0	—	—	—	—	—
2024–25	Henderson Silver Knights	AHL	19	0	9	9	10	—	—	—	—	—
2025–26	Henderson Silver Knights	AHL	49	8	39	47	32	6	2	3	5	2
NHL totals			2	0	1	1	0	—	—	—	—	—

=== International ===
Year	Team	Event	Result	GP	G	A	Pts	PIM
2018	Canada Red	U17	4th	6	0	0	0	2
2019	Canada	HG18	2nd place, silver medalist(s)	5	0	0	0	2
2022	Canada	WJC	1st place, gold medalist(s)	7	1	4	5	0
Junior totals				15	1	4	5	4

== Awards and honours ==
Award	Year
QMJHL
All-Rookie Team	2019
Defenseman of the Year (Emile Bouchard Trophy)	2021, 2022
First All-Star Team	2021, 2022
CHL
CHL Top Prospects Game	2020

Awards and achievements
Preceded by Jordan Spence	Emile Bouchard Trophy; 2020–21; 2021–22	Succeeded by Tristan Luneau
