= Nathan Légaré =

Canadian ice hockey player (born 2001)

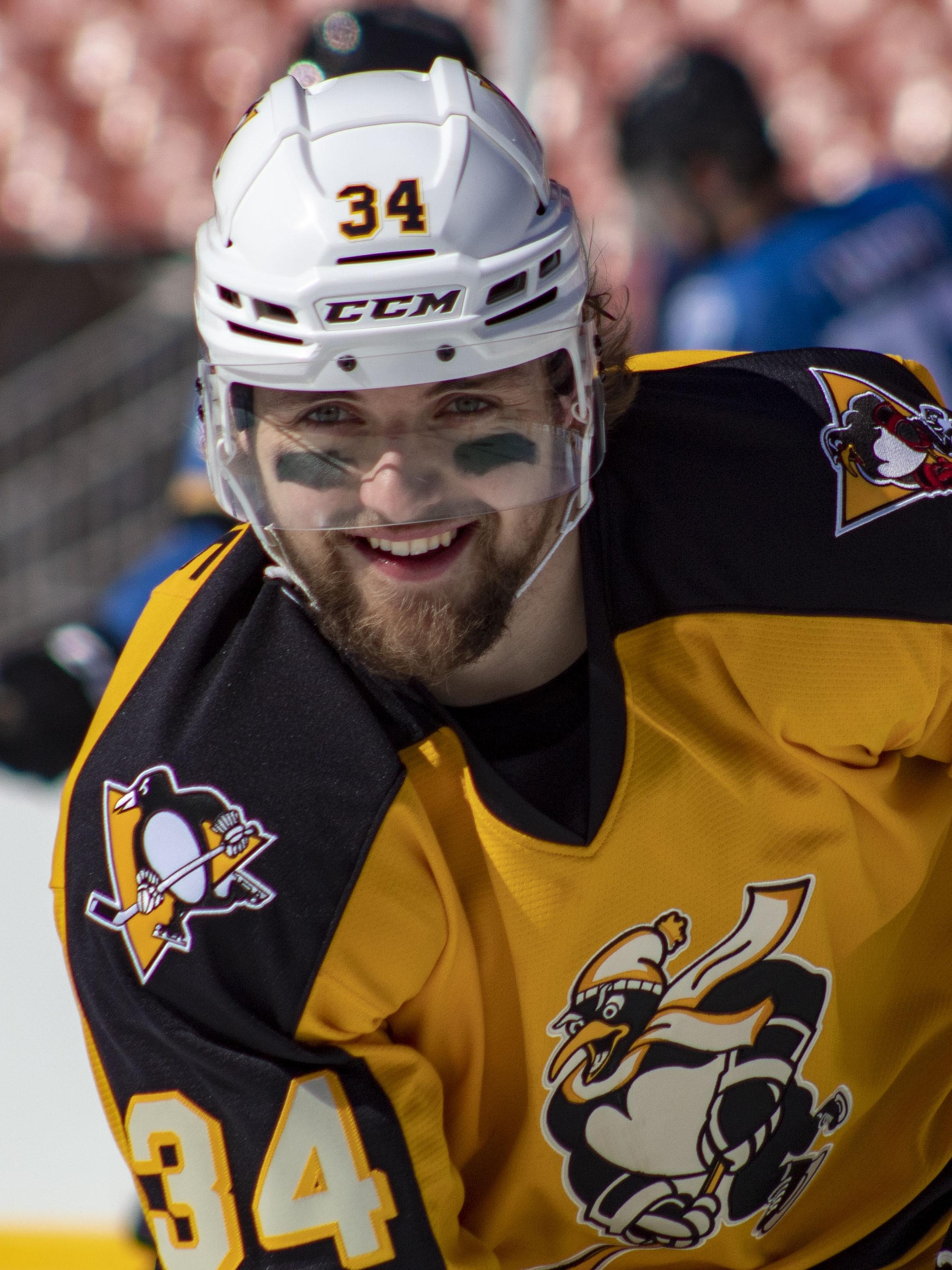
- Légaré with the Wilkes-Barre/Scranton Penguins in March 2023
- Born: January 11, 2001 (age 25) Montreal, Quebec, Canada
- Height: 6 ft 0 in (183 cm)
- Weight: 200 lb (91 kg; 14 st 4 lb)
- Position: Right wing
- Shoots: Right
- KHL team Former teams: Traktor Chelyabinsk; New Jersey Devils
- NHL draft: 74th overall, 2019; Pittsburgh Penguins
- Playing career: 2021–present

Nathan Légaré (born January 11, 2001) is a Canadian professional ice hockey right wing who is currently under contract to Traktor Chelyabinsk of the Kontinental Hockey League (KHL). He was selected by the Pittsburgh Penguins in the 2019 NHL entry draft.

== Playing career ==
Légaré played four seasons of major junior hockey in the QMJHL between Baie-Comeau Drakkar and Val-d'Or Foreurs during which he was selected by the Pittsburgh Penguins in the third-round, 74th overall, of the 2019 NHL entry draft.

Signed by the Penguins to a three-year, entry-level contract on September 20, 2019, Légaré made his professional debut within the organization with AHL affiliate, the Wilkes-Barre/Scranton Penguins during the 2021–22 season.

After two seasons with Wilkes-Barre/Scranton, Légaré was traded by the Penguins on August 6, 2023, to the Montreal Canadiens as part of a three-team trade also involving the San Jose Sharks. Beginning the 2023–24 season with the Canadiens AHL affiliate, the Laval Rocket, Légaré's tenure with Montreal was brief as he was again traded on March 12, 2024, to the New Jersey Devils in exchange for Arnaud Durandeau.

During the 2024–25 season, Légaré played his first NHL game with the Devils on December 2, 2024. He was scoreless through 3 appearances with the Devils before he was returned to play out the remainder of the season with AHL affiliate, the Utica Comets.

After three seasons within the Devils organization, Légaré left as a free agent and was signed to a one-year contract abroad with Russian club, Traktor Chelyabinsk of the KHL on July 23, 2026.

== Career statistics ==
=== Regular season and playoffs ===
| | | | Regular season | | | | | Playoffs |
| Season | Team | League | GP | G | A | Pts | PIM | GP | G | A | Pts | PIM |
|---|---|---|---|---|---|---|---|---|---|---|---|---|
| 2016–17 | Saint-Eustache Vikings | QMAAA | 40 | 20 | 31 | 51 | 72 | 5 | 0 | 2 | 2 | 14 |
| 2017–18 | Baie-Comeau Drakkar | QMJHL | 62 | 10 | 19 | 29 | 43 | 5 | 0 | 1 | 1 | 2 |
| 2018–19 | Baie-Comeau Drakkar | QMJHL | 68 | 45 | 42 | 87 | 52 | 7 | 3 | 1 | 4 | 6 |
| 2019–20 | Baie-Comeau Drakkar | QMJHL | 61 | 35 | 36 | 71 | 75 | — | — | — | — | — |
| 2020–21 | Baie-Comeau Drakkar | QMJHL | 14 | 5 | 9 | 14 | 10 | — | — | — | — | — |
| 2020–21 | Val-d'Or Foreurs | QMJHL | 19 | 11 | 13 | 24 | 21 | 15 | 14 | 4 | 18 | 12 |
| 2021–22 | Wilkes-Barre/Scranton Penguins | AHL | 57 | 7 | 9 | 16 | 30 | 2 | 1 | 1 | 2 | 2 |
| 2022–23 | Wilkes-Barre/Scranton Penguins | AHL | 68 | 8 | 11 | 19 | 76 | — | — | — | — | — |
| 2023–24 | Laval Rocket | AHL | 39 | 6 | 3 | 9 | 42 | — | — | — | — | — |
| 2023–24 | Utica Comets | AHL | 15 | 2 | 1 | 3 | 19 | — | — | — | — | — |
| 2024–25 | Utica Comets | AHL | 69 | 17 | 8 | 25 | 102 | — | — | — | — | — |
| 2024–25 | New Jersey Devils | NHL | 3 | 0 | 0 | 0 | 0 | — | — | — | — | — |
| 2025–26 | Utica Comets | AHL | 65 | 13 | 7 | 20 | 76 | — | — | — | — | — |
| 2025–26 | New Jersey Devils | NHL | 1 | 0 | 0 | 0 | 0 | — | — | — | — | — |
| NHL totals | | | 4 | 0 | 0 | 0 | 0 | — | — | — | — | — |

=== International ===
| Year | Team | Event | Result | GP | G | A | Pts | PIM |
|---|---|---|---|---|---|---|---|---|
| 2017 | Canada White | U17 | 4th | 6 | 2 | 1 | 3 | 8 |
| 2019 | Canada | U18 | 4th | 7 | 4 | 0 | 4 | 4 |
| Junior totals | | | | 13 | 6 | 1 | 7 | 12 |
