= Maxence Guénette =

Canadian ice hockey player (born 2001)

- Born: April 28, 2001 (age 25) L'Ancienne-Lorette, Quebec, Canada
- Height: 6 ft 1 in (185 cm)
- Weight: 181 lb (82 kg; 12 st 13 lb)
- Position: Defence
- Shoots: Right
- NHL team (P) Cur. team Former teams: Boston Bruins; Providence Bruins (AHL); Ottawa Senators
- NHL draft: 187th overall, 2019; Ottawa Senators
- Playing career: 2021–present

Maxence Guénette (born April 28, 2001) is a Canadian professional ice hockey player. He plays as a defenceman for the Providence Bruins of the American Hockey League (AHL) while under contract with the Boston Bruins of the National Hockey League (NHL). Guénette was selected 187th overall in the seventh round of the 2019 NHL entry draft by the Ottawa Senators, with whose organization he spent the first four years of his professional career.

== Playing career ==
=== Amateur ===
Guénette played his entire major junior hockey with the Val-d'Or Foreurs of the Quebec Major Junior Hockey League (QMJHL). He was selected fifth overall in the 2017 QMJHL entry draft by the Foreurs. Guénette joined the Foreurs during the midst of a rebuild. In his first season in 2017–18, he scored one goal and 11 assists for 12 points in 61 games. The Foreurs made the playoffs but were eliminated in the first round by the Blainville-Boisbriand Armada. In four playoff games, he recorded two assists. Guénette established himself as a reliable defender with the Foreurs with good mobility and size. In his second season in 2018–19, he tallied eight goals and 32 points in 68 games. The Foreurs qualified for the playoffs again and faced the Victoriaville Tigres but fell short of advancing to the second round, losing the best-of-seven series, four games to three. In the seven games, he scored one goal and three points. He returned to Val-d'Or and improved his defensive game and was on pace to set statistical highs in his major junior career, scoring 11 goals and 40 points in 62 games, when the 2019–20 QMJHL season was ended early on account of the COVID-19 pandemic. In the following pandemic-shortened 2020–21 season, he marked five goals and 22 points in 36 games. The Foreurs returned to the playoffs and advanced to the championship final where they fell to the Tigres again. In 15 playoff games, Guénette recorded three goals and seven points.

=== Professional ===
Guénette was selected by the Ottawa Senators of the National Hockey League (NHL) in the seventh round, 187th overall in the 2019 NHL entry draft. He signed a three-year entry-level contract with Ottawa on April 3, 2021. Guénette was assigned to Ottawa's American Hockey League (AHL) affiliate, the Belleville Senators. In his first season in the AHL in 2021–22, he appeared in only 48 games, scoring six goals and 19 points. In his first two seasons with Belleville, Guénette's numbers improved year over year, upping to five goals and 40 points in 72 games in 2022–23. Guénette was recalled by Ottawa in April 2023 and made his NHL debut in the team's final game of the season versus the Buffalo Sabres on April 13, 2023.

Guénette had a strong 2023 training camp and was one of the final cuts, being assigned to the AHL on October 8. In February, Guénette and teammate Angus Crookshank represented Belleville at the 2024 AHL All-Star Classic. He was recalled by Ottawa for the first time in the 2023–24 season on an emergency basis on February 15, 2024 after Artem Zub suffered an injury. He made his NHL season debut that night against the Anaheim Ducks. He was recalled again on an emergency basis on March 2 and played that night against the Philadelphia Flyers before being returned to Belleville again. He was recalled again on March 7. After Thomas Chabot returned from injury, Guénette was returned to Belleville on March 17. In seven games with Ottawa, he went scoreless. He finished the season in Belleville, tallying seven goals and 34 points in 58 games. Belleville qualified for the playoffs and he appeared in all seven of their Calder Cup playoff games, registering an assist. On June 18, 2024, it was announced that Guénette had signed a one-year, two-way contract extension with Ottawa.

Guénette passed through waivers, going unclaimed, and was assigned to Belleville to start the 2024–25 season. He was recalled by Ottawa on January 7, 2025 to replace the injured Jacob Bernard-Docker. However, he was a healthy scratch for five straight games in the NHL and was returned to Belleville on January 14 without having played for Ottawa. In 58 games with Belleville, he marked nine goals and 23 points. As a restricted free agent entering the 2025–26 season, Guénette remained unsigned into November. Just under two months into the season, Ottawa traded his signing rights to the Philadelphia Flyers in exchange for defenceman Dennis Gilbert. He subsequently signed a one-year, two-way contract with Philadelphia. He was assigned to Philadelphia's AHL affiliate, the Lehigh Valley Phantoms. In 46 games with the Phantoms, he recorded two goals and 24 points.

At the conclusion of his contract with the Flyers, Guénette left as an unrestricted free agent and was signed to a one-year, two-way contract with the Boston Bruins for the 2026–27 season on July 1, 2026. He was placed on waivers and assigned to Boston's AHL affiliate, the Providence Bruins to start the season.

== International career ==
Guénette played with Team Canada in the 2018 Hlinka Gretzky Cup, where he won a gold medal after defeating Sweden in the final.

== Career statistics ==
=== Regular season and playoffs ===
			Regular season					Playoffs
Season	Team	League	GP	G	A	Pts	PIM	GP	G	A	Pts	PIM
2017–18	Val-d'Or Foreurs	QMJHL	61	1	11	12	12	4	0	2	2	0
2018–19	Val-d'Or Foreurs	QMJHL	68	8	24	32	36	7	1	2	3	0
2019–20	Val-d'Or Foreurs	QMJHL	62	11	29	40	22	—	—	—	—	—
2020–21	Val-d'Or Foreurs	QMJHL	36	5	17	22	14	15	3	4	7	4
2021–22	Belleville Senators	AHL	48	6	13	19	4	—	—	—	—	—
2022–23	Belleville Senators	AHL	72	5	35	40	25	—	—	—	—	—
2022–23	Ottawa Senators	NHL	1	0	0	0	0	—	—	—	—	—
2023–24	Belleville Senators	AHL	58	7	27	34	18	7	0	1	1	0
2023–24	Ottawa Senators	NHL	7	0	0	0	2	—	—	—	—	—
2024–25	Belleville Senators	AHL	58	9	14	23	34	—	—	—	—	—
2025–26	Lehigh Valley Phantoms	AHL	46	2	22	24	19	—	—	—	—	—
NHL totals			8	0	0	0	2	—	—	—	—	—

=== International ===
Year	Team	Event	Result	GP	G	A	Pts	PIM
2017	Canada Black	U17	7th	5	0	1	1	2
2018	Canada	HG18	1st place, gold medalist(s)	5	1	1	2	2
Junior totals				10	1	2	3	4
