= Dawson Mercer =

Canadian ice hockey player (born 2001)

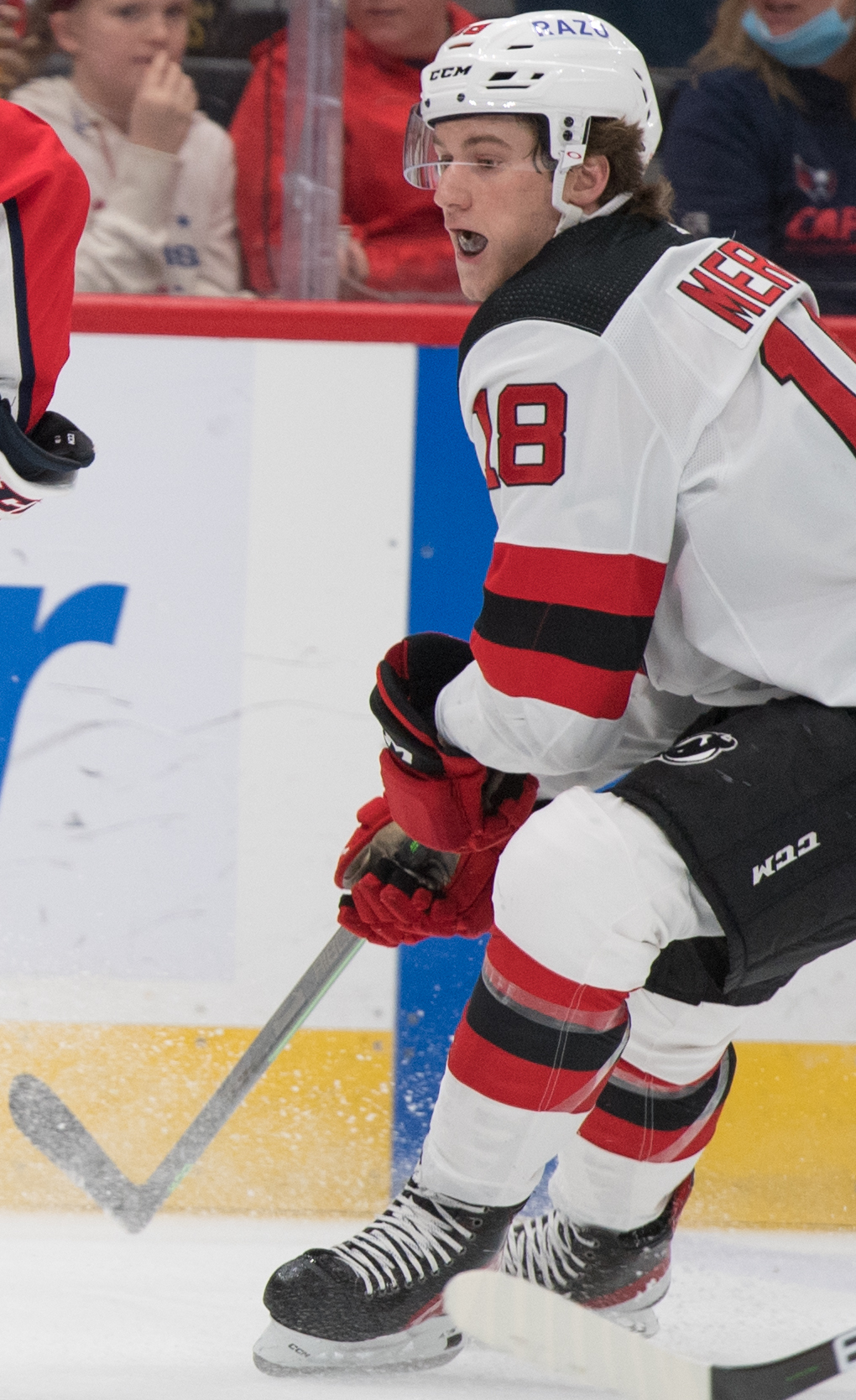
- Mercer with the New Jersey Devils in 2022
- Born: October 27, 2001 (age 25) Carbonear, Newfoundland, Canada
- Height: 6 ft 0 in (183 cm)
- Weight: 180 lb (82 kg; 12 st 12 lb)
- Position: Forward
- Shoots: Right
- NHL team Former teams: Winnipeg Jets; New Jersey Devils
- National team: Canada
- NHL draft: 18th overall, 2020; New Jersey Devils
- Playing career: 2021–present

Dawson Mercer (born October 27, 2001) is a Canadian professional ice hockey player who is a forward for the Winnipeg Jets of the National Hockey League (NHL). He was drafted 18th overall by the New Jersey Devils in the 2020 NHL entry draft.

== Early life ==
Mercer was born on October 27, 2001, in Carbonear, Newfoundland, to parents Charlotte and Craig. His father is a powerline technician while his mother manages a convenience store. His father also coached in the Conception Bay North area and had a tryout with the American Hockey League’s St. John's Maple Leafs. Besides his father, both of his younger siblings also play ice hockey; his brother Riley Mercer is a goaltender while his sister Jessica Mercer is a defenceman. His cousin Zachery Bennett also plays ice hockey.

== Playing career ==
=== Junior ===
Growing up in Newfoundland, Mercer played for the Tri Pen Ice U15 AAA in the Newfoundland Bantam AAA league. After recording 68 points in 24 games, Mercer chose to play prep hockey with the Bishop's College School under-18 varsity team at the age of 15. He chose to leave his home province in part to increase his playing ability and join his cousin. In his first season at Bishop, he finished third in scoring with 18 goals and 30 assists through 51 games to earn a high ranking by the Quebec Major Junior Hockey League's (QMJHL) Central Scouting. Mercer was eventually drafted eighth overall by the Drummondville Voltigeurs in the 2017 QMJHL draft.

As a rookie in the QMJHL, Mercer recorded 26 points through 68 games. During the season, he was selected for Team Canada's Black U17 team at the World Under-17 Hockey Challenge. In the 2019–20 season, he finished with 60 points in 42 games and was nominated for the Michael Bossy Trophy.

=== Professional ===
On December 24, 2020, Mercer was signed to a three-year, entry-level contract by the New Jersey Devils. He made his NHL debut the following season on October 15, 2021, against the Chicago Blackhawks. During the game, he recorded his first career NHL assist on a goal by Andreas Johnsson. On October 19, Mercer scored his first NHL goal against the Seattle Kraken. He would finish his rookie season with 42 points, and led the team in games played with 82.

On April 27, 2023, Mercer scored his first NHL playoff goal against the New York Rangers, in a 4–0 shutout in game 5 of the 2023 playoffs.

Following the final year of his entry-level contract in 2023–24, a season in which he recorded 20 goals and 33 points while playing in all 82 games for the Devils, Mercer remained a restricted free agent until training camp had already started. On September 20, 2024, after missing the first practice of camp, he was signed to a three-year contract with an average annual value of $4 million.

On October 23, 2026, Mercer was traded to the Winnipeg Jets as part of a deal for Connor Hellebuyck. Later, on November 5th, 2026- Mercer scored his first goal as a Winnipeg Jet in a 4-2 Jets victory over the Vancouver Canucks.

== International play ==
Medal record

Men's ice hockey

Representing Canada

World Championships
Silver medal – second place	2022 Finland	

World Junior Championships
Gold medal – first place	2020 Czech Republic	
Silver medal – second place	2021 Canada	

Mercer made his international debut with the Canadian national junior team at the 2020 World Junior Championships, winning a gold medal. He rejoined Canada for 2021 World Junior Championships, held in a bubble in Edmonton as a result of the onset of the COVID-19 pandemic. They reached the final for a second consecutive year, but were defeated by the United States. Mercer reflected that the experience of a tournament with no fans in the arena was a "unique situation," one that he felt was "going to be remembered in history."

Following the 2021–22 NHL regular season, with the Devils failing to qualify for the 2022 Stanley Cup playoffs, Mercer accepted an invitation to make his senior national team debut at the 2022 World Championship. He was one of the most effective faceoff men in the tournament, helping Canada reach the event final. They were defeated by Finland, taking the silver medal. Two years later, Mercer rejoined Canada for the 2024 World Championship.

== Career statistics ==
=== Regular season and playoffs ===
			Regular season					Playoffs
Season	Team	League	GP	G	A	Pts	PIM	GP	G	A	Pts	PIM
2017–18	Drummondville Voltigeurs	QMJHL	61	11	15	26	25	10	1	3	4	0
2018–19	Drummondville Voltigeurs	QMJHL	68	30	34	64	50	16	5	11	16	8
2019–20	Drummondville Voltigeurs	QMJHL	26	18	24	42	21	—	—	—	—	—
2019–20	Chicoutimi Saguenéens	QMJHL	16	6	12	18	4	—	—	—	—	—
2020–21	Chicoutimi Saguenéens	QMJHL	23	19	17	36	6	9	6	11	17	4
2021–22	New Jersey Devils	NHL	82	17	25	42	28	—	—	—	—	—
2022–23	New Jersey Devils	NHL	82	27	29	56	14	12	3	4	7	2
2023–24	New Jersey Devils	NHL	82	20	13	33	29	—	—	—	—	—
2024–25	New Jersey Devils	NHL	82	19	17	36	16	5	2	0	2	8
2025–26	New Jersey Devils	NHL	82	20	22	42	33	—	—	—	—	—
2026–27	New Jersey Devils	NHL	10	0	4	4	0	—	—	—	—	—
NHL totals			420	103	110	213	120	17	5	4	9	10

=== International ===
Year	Team	Event	Result	GP	G	A	Pts	PIM
2017	Canada Black	U17	7th	5	2	0	2	0
2020	Canada	WJC	1st place, gold medalist(s)	7	0	0	0	0
2021	Canada	WJC	2nd place, silver medalist(s)	7	2	4	6	2
2022	Canada	WC	2nd place, silver medalist(s)	10	0	5	5	0
2024	Canada	WC	4th	9	3	1	4	4
2026	Canada	WC	4th	4	0	0	0	0
Junior totals				19	4	4	8	2
Senior totals				23	3	6	9	4

== Awards and honors ==
Award	Year	Ref
QMJHL
Guy Carbonneau Trophy	2021	

Awards and achievements
Preceded by Alexander Holtz	New Jersey Devils first-round draft pick 2020	Succeeded by Shakir Mukhamadullin
