= Elliot Desnoyers =

Canadian ice hockey player

- Born: January 21, 2002 (age 24) Saint-Hyacinthe, Quebec, Canada
- Height: 5 ft 11 in (180 cm)
- Weight: 183 lb (83 kg; 13 st 1 lb)
- Position: Left wing
- Shoots: Left
- AHL team Former teams: Syracuse Crunch; Philadelphia Flyers
- NHL draft: 135th overall, 2020; Philadelphia Flyers
- Playing career: 2022–present

Elliot Desnoyers (born January 21, 2002) is a Canadian professional ice hockey left wing for the Syracuse Crunch of the American Hockey League (AHL). He was selected 135th overall by the Philadelphia Flyers in the 2020 NHL entry draft.

== Playing career ==
Desnoyers played major junior hockey in the Quebec Major Junior Hockey League (QMJHL) with the Moncton Wildcats and Halifax Mooseheads. He was selected by the Philadelphia Flyers in the fourth round, 135th overall, of the 2020 NHL entry draft.

Following his first season with the Mooseheads in 2020–21, resulting in a selection to the QMJHL Second All-Star Team, Desnoyers was signed by the Flyers to a three-year, entry-level contract on May 5, 2021.

Returning for his final junior season in 2021–22, Desnoyers was selected as captain of the Halifax Mooseheads, and notched a career season best with 42 goals and 46 assists for 88 points in 61 regular season games, placing second on the team in scoring.

Desnoyers began his professional career in the 2022–23 season assigned to the Flyers AHL affiliate, the Lehigh Valley Phantoms. Producing offensively with the Phantoms in a top-line role, Desnoyers received his first recall to the Flyers on February 25, 2023. He immediately made his NHL debut that night with the Flyers, featuring in a 7–0 defeat to the New Jersey Devils.

He was not tendered a qualifying offer following his third season in the Flyers organization, making him an unrestricted free agent. He signed a one-year contract with the Iowa Wild on July 14, 2025.

After a lone season within the Iowa Wild organization, Desnoyers left as a free agent and was signed to a one-year AHL contract with the Syracuse Crunch, affiliate to the Tampa Bay Lightning, on July 3, 2026.

== Personal life ==
Desnoyer's father, David Desnoyers, played hockey collegiately and semi-professionally exclusively within Quebec. His younger brother, Caleb, also plays at the major junior level with the Moncton Wildcats of the QMJHL

== Career statistics ==
=== Regular season and playoffs ===
			Regular season					Playoffs
Season	Team	League	GP	G	A	Pts	PIM	GP	G	A	Pts	PIM
2016–17	Antoine-Girouard Gaulois	QMAAA	24	4	14	18	4	7	1	3	4	10
2017–18	Saint-Hyacinthe Gaulois	QMAAA	40	10	26	36	36	3	0	1	1	0
2018–19	Moncton Wildcats	QMJHL	61	12	19	31	12	11	2	2	4	2
2019–20	Moncton Wildcats	QMJHL	61	11	24	35	18	—	—	—	—	—
2020–21	Halifax Mooseheads	QMJHL	37	21	28	49	24	—	—	—	—	—
2021–22	Halifax Mooseheads	QMJHL	61	42	46	88	35	5	1	8	9	2
2022–23	Lehigh Valley Phantoms	AHL	65	23	21	44	16	3	1	0	1	2
2022–23	Philadelphia Flyers	NHL	4	0	0	0	0	—	—	—	—	—
2023–24	Lehigh Valley Phantoms	AHL	63	6	16	22	23	4	0	0	0	0
2024–25	Lehigh Valley Phantoms	AHL	59	5	14	19	27	4	0	1	1	4
2025–26	Iowa Wild	AHL	18	1	3	4	6	—	—	—	—	—
2025–26	Iowa Heartlanders	ECHL	45	10	21	31	35	—	—	—	—	—
NHL totals			4	0	0	0	0	—	—	—	—	—

Medal record

Representing Canada

Ice hockey

World Junior Championships
Gold medal – first place	2022 Canada	

=== International ===
Year	Team	Event	Result	GP	G	A	Pts	PIM
2018	Canada Red	U17	4th	6	1	0	1	6
2022	Canada	WJC	1st place, gold medalist(s)	7	0	1	1	0
Junior totals				13	1	1	2	6

== Awards and honours ==
Award	Year
QMJHL
Second All-Star Team	2021
