= Emile Bouchard Trophy =

The Émile Bouchard Trophy is awarded annually by the Quebec Maritimes Junior Hockey League (QMJHL) to the player judged to be the best "Defenceman of the Year."

== Winners ==
Season	Player	Team
1975–76	Jean Gagnon	Quebec Remparts
1976–77	Robert Picard	Montreal Juniors
1977–78	Mark Hardy	Montreal Juniors
1978–79	Ray Bourque	Verdun Éperviers
1979–80	Gaston Therrien	Quebec Remparts
1980–81	Fred Boimistruck	Cornwall Royals
1981–82	Paul Boutilier	Sherbrooke Castors
1982–83	J. J. Daigneault	Longueuil Chevaliers
1983–84	Bill Campbell	Verdun Juniors
1984–85	Yves Beaudoin	Shawinigan Cataractes
1985–86	Sylvain Côté	Hull Olympiques
1986–87	Jean-Marc Richard	Chicoutimi Saguenéens
1987–88	Éric Desjardins	Granby Bisons
1988–89	Yves Racine	Victoriaville Tigres
1989–90	Claude Barthe	Victoriaville Tigres
1990–91	Patrice Brisebois	Drummondville Voltigeurs
1991–92	François Groleau	Shawinigan Cataractes
1992–93	Benoît Larose	Laval Titan
1993–94	Steve Gosselin	Chicoutimi Saguenéens
1994–95	Stéphane Julien	Sherbrooke Faucons
1995–96	Denis Gauthier	Drummondville Voltigeurs
1996–97	Stéphane Robidas	Shawinigan Cataractes
1997–98	Derrick Walser	Rimouski Océanic
1998–99	Jiri Fischer	Hull Olympiques
1999–2000	Michel Périard	Rimouski Océanic
2000–01	Marc-André Bergeron	Shawinigan Cataractes
2001–02	Danny Groulx	Victoriaville Tigres
2002–03	Maxime Fortunus	Baie-Comeau Drakkar
2003–04	Doug O'Brien	Gatineau Olympiques
2004–05	Mario Scalzo	Rimouski Océanic / Victoriaville Tigres
2005–06	Keith Yandle	Moncton Wildcats
2006–07	Kris Letang	Val-d'Or Foreurs
2007–08	Marc-André Bourdon	Rouyn-Noranda Huskies
2008–09	Dmitry Kulikov	Drummondville Voltigeurs
2009–10	David Savard	Moncton Wildcats
2010–11	Simon Després	Saint John Sea Dogs
2011–12	Jérôme Gauthier-Leduc	Rimouski Océanic
2012–13	Kevin Gagné	Rimouski Océanic
2013–14	Guillaume Gélinas	Val-d'Or Foreurs
2014–15	Jan Kostalek	Rimouski Océanic
2015–16	Sam Girard	Shawinigan Cataractes
2016–17	Thomas Chabot	Saint John Sea Dogs
2017–18	Olivier Galipeau	Acadie–Bathurst Titan
2018–19	Charle-Édouard D'Astous	Rimouski Océanic
2019–20	Jordan Spence	Moncton Wildcats
2020–21	Lukas Cormier	Charlottetown Islanders
2021–22	Lukas Cormier	Charlottetown Islanders
2022–23	Tristan Luneau	Gatineau Olympiques
2023–24	Vsevolod Komarov	Drummondville Voltigeurs
2024–25	Xavier Villeneuve	Blainville-Boisbriand Armada
2025–26	Tommy Bleyl	Moncton Wildcats
