= River Denys, Nova Scotia =

Community in Nova Scotia, Canada

Coordinates: 45°50′10.16″N 61°10′42.54″W

River Denys in Nova Scotia

River Denys is a small community in the Canadian province of Nova Scotia, located in Inverness County on Cape Breton Island.

== Name ==
River Denys is possibly named for Nicolas Denys, a 17th-century French merchant. It may also be named for a Mi'kmaq chief named Denys who lived at the mouth of the River Denys when Scottish settlers began arriving in the area.

== Notable people ==
Colten Ellis, ice hockey goaltender for the Buffalo Sabres in the NHL.
