= Raymond Lagacé Trophy =

The Raymond Lagacé Trophy is awarded annually to the Defensive Rookie of the Year in the Quebec Maritimes Junior Hockey League. Prior to 1980, there was only one Rookie of the Year trophy, the Michel Bergeron Trophy, which was awarded to the Overall Rookie of the Year.

== Winners ==
Season	Player	Team
1980–81	Billy Campbell	Montreal Juniors
1981–82	Michel Petit	Sherbrooke Castors
1982–83	Bobby Dollas	Laval Voisins
1983–84	James Gasseau	Drummondville Voltigeurs
1984–85	Robert Desjardins	Shawinigan Cataractes
1985–86	Stéphane Guérard	Shawinigan Cataractes
1986–87	Jimmy Waite	Chicoutimi Saguenéens
1987–88	Stéphane Beauregard	Saint-Jean Castors
1988–89	Karl Dykhuis	Hull Olympiques
1989–90	François Groleau	Shawinigan Cataractes
1990–91	Phillippe Boucher	Granby Bisons
1991–92	Philippe DeRouville	Verdun Collège Français
1992–93	Stephane Routhier	Drummondville Voltigeurs
1993–94	Jimmy Drolet	Saint-Hyacinthe Laser
1994–95	Martin Biron	Beauport Harfangs
1995–96	Mathieu Garon	Victoriaville Tigres
1996–97	Christian Bronsard	Hull Olympiques
1997–98	Alexei Tezikov	Moncton Wildcats
1998–99	Aleksei Volkov	Halifax Mooseheads
1999–2000	Kirill Safronov	Quebec Remparts
2000–01	Tomas Malec	Rimouski Océanic
2001–02	Jeff Deslauriers	Chicoutimi Saguenéens
2002–03	Mario Scalzo	Victoriaville Tigres
2003–04	Julien Ellis	Shawinigan Cataractes
2004–05	Maxime Joyal	Quebec Remparts
2005–06	Ondrej Pavelec	Cape Breton Screaming Eagles
2006–07	T. J. Brennan	St. John's Fog Devils
2007–08	Olivier Roy	Cape Breton Screaming Eagles
2008–09	Dmitry Kulikov	Drummondville Voltigeurs
2009–10	Robin Gusse	Chicoutimi Saguenéens
2010–11	Domenic Graham	Drummondville Voltigeurs
2011–12	Zachary Fucale	Halifax Mooseheads
2012–13	Philippe Desrosiers	Rimouski Océanic
2013–14	Jérémy Roy	Sherbrooke Phoenix
2014–15	Sam Girard	Shawinigan Cataractes
2015–16	Mathieu Bellemare	Gatineau Olympiques
2016–17	Jared McIsaac	Halifax Mooseheads
2017–18	Colten Ellis	Rimouski Océanic
2018–19	Jordan Spence	Moncton Wildcats
2019–20	Samuel Hlavaj	Sherbrooke Phoenix
2020–21	Tristan Luneau	Gatineau Olympiques
2021–22	David Spacek	Sherbrooke Phoenix
2022–23	Marcus Kearsey	Charlottetown Islanders
2023–24	Xavier Villeneuve	Blainville-Boisbriand Armada
2024–25	William Lacelle	Rimouski Océanic
2025–26	Tommy Bleyl	Moncton Wildcats
