= 2020–21 QMJHL season =

- League: Quebec Major Junior Hockey League
- Sport: Hockey
- Duration: Regular season October 2, 2020 – April 18, 2021; Playoffs; April 23 – June 5, 2021
- Teams: 18
- TV partner(s): Eastlink TV; TVA Sports; MATV
- Finals champions: Victoriaville Tigres

QMJHL seasons
- 2019–20 2021–22

2020–21 CHL season
- League: Canadian Hockey League
- Sport: Hockey
- Duration: OHL; Did not play QMJHL; October 2020 – June 2021; WHL; February 2021 – May 2021
- Teams: 60
- TV partner(s): TVA Sports; Rogers Sportsnet; Rogers TV; Shaw TV

The 2020–21 QMJHL season was the 52nd season of the Quebec Major Junior Hockey League (QMJHL). The regular season began on October 2, 2020, and ended on April 18, 2021.

The playoffs began on April 23 and ended on June 5 with the Victoriaville Tigres winning the President's Cup as the QMJHL champion. Traditionally, the champion would have earned a berth in the 2021 Memorial Cup, which was to be hosted by the Ontario Hockey League from June 17 to 27, 2021, however, the Memorial Cup was cancelled for the second season in a row due to the restrictions during the ongoing COVID-19 pandemic. The QMJHL was the only Canadian Hockey League member to award a playoff champion in 2021 as the Ontario Hockey League completely cancelled its season and the Western Hockey League only had small regional tournaments.

== Final standings ==
Source: TheQMJHL.ca
Note: GP = Games played; W = Wins; L = Losses; OTL = Overtime losses; SL = Shootout losses; GF = Goals for; GA = Goals against; PTS = Points; PTS%= Points percentage; x = clinched playoff berth; y = clinched division title; z = clinched Jean Rougeau Trophy

| Maritimes Division | GP | W | L | OTL | SL | PTS | PTS% | GF | GA | Rank |
|---|---|---|---|---|---|---|---|---|---|---|
| xyz-Charlottetown Islanders | 40 | 35 | 5 | 0 | 0 | 70 | .875 | 197 | 89 | 1 |
| x-Acadie–Bathurst Titan | 33 | 21 | 10 | 1 | 1 | 44 | .667 | 146 | 121 | 4 |
| x-Saint John Sea Dogs | 33 | 15 | 14 | 3 | 1 | 34 | .515 | 138 | 136 | 11 |
| x-Halifax Mooseheads | 43 | 15 | 19 | 5 | 4 | 39 | .453 | 152 | 183 | 13 |
| x-Moncton Wildcats | 31 | 11 | 17 | 2 | 1 | 25 | .403 | 105 | 136 | 14 |
| x-Cape Breton Eagles | 38 | 12 | 25 | 1 | 0 | 25 | .329 | 113 | 186 | 17 |

| East Division | GP | W | L | OTL | SL | PTS | PTS% | GF | GA | Rank |
|---|---|---|---|---|---|---|---|---|---|---|
| xy-Chicoutimi Saguenéens | 29 | 17 | 7 | 3 | 2 | 39 | .672 | 105 | 77 | 3 |
| x-Shawinigan Cataractes | 34 | 21 | 10 | 2 | 1 | 45 | .662 | 125 | 109 | 5 |
| x-Victoriaville Tigres | 26 | 16 | 9 | 1 | 0 | 33 | .635 | 99 | 65 | 6 |
| x-Quebec Remparts | 32 | 17 | 9 | 4 | 2 | 40 | .625 | 107 | 96 | 8 |
| x-Rimouski Océanic | 39 | 13 | 22 | 2 | 2 | 30 | .385 | 104 | 143 | 15 |
| x-Baie-Comeau Drakkar | 36 | 8 | 26 | 1 | 1 | 18 | .250 | 82 | 137 | 18 |

| West Division | GP | W | L | OTL | SL | PTS | PTS% | GF | GA | Rank |
|---|---|---|---|---|---|---|---|---|---|---|
| xy-Val-d'Or Foreurs | 36 | 29 | 3 | 2 | 2 | 62 | .861 | 141 | 78 | 2 |
| x-Blainville-Boisbriand Armada | 32 | 18 | 10 | 4 | 0 | 40 | .625 | 133 | 118 | 7 |
| x-Drummondville Voltigeurs | 34 | 18 | 11 | 4 | 1 | 41 | .603 | 106 | 104 | 9 |
| x-Gatineau Olympiques | 31 | 16 | 11 | 2 | 2 | 36 | .581 | 95 | 87 | 10 |
| x-Rouyn-Noranda Huskies | 40 | 17 | 18 | 4 | 1 | 39 | .488 | 100 | 146 | 12 |
| x-Sherbrooke Phoenix | 27 | 8 | 17 | 1 | 1 | 18 | .333 | 68 | 105 | 16 |

== Scoring leaders ==
Note: GP = Games played; G = Goals; A = Assists; Pts = Points; PIM = Penalty minutes
Source: TheQMJHL.ca

| Player | Team | GP | G | A | Pts | PIM |
|---|---|---|---|---|---|---|
| Cédric Desruisseaux | Charlottetown Islanders | 40 | 42 | 36 | 78 | 28 |
| Thomas Casey | Charlottetown Islanders | 38 | 34 | 40 | 74 | 34 |
| Brett Budgell | Charlottetown Islanders | 40 | 15 | 43 | 58 | 28 |
| Lukas Cormier | Charlottetown Islanders | 39 | 16 | 38 | 54 | 36 |
| Mathieu Desgagnés | Acadie–Bathurst Titan | 31 | 24 | 28 | 52 | 15 |
| Ryan Francis | Cape Breton/Saint John | 32 | 16 | 34 | 50 | 24 |
| Elliot Desnoyers | Halifax Mooseheads | 37 | 21 | 28 | 49 | 24 |
| Olivier Nadeau | Shawinigan Cataractes | 34 | 13 | 32 | 45 | 28 |
| Mavrik Bourque | Shawinigan Cataractes | 28 | 19 | 24 | 43 | 36 |
| Shawn Element | Cape Breton/Victoriaville | 31 | 17 | 26 | 43 | 18 |

== Leading goaltenders ==
Note: GP = Games played; Mins = Minutes played; W = Wins; L = Losses: OTL = Overtime losses; SL = Shootout losses; GA = Goals Allowed; SO = Shutouts; GAA = Goals against average
Source: TheQMJHL.ca

| Player | Team | GP | Mins | W | L | OTL | SOL | GA | SO | Sv% | GAA |
|---|---|---|---|---|---|---|---|---|---|---|---|
| Colten Ellis | Charlottetown Islanders | 24 | 1447:37 | 23 | 1 | 0 | 0 | 43 | 7 | .926 | 1.78 |
| Jonathan Lemieux | Val-d'Or Foreurs | 24 | 1440:02 | 20 | 2 | 1 | 1 | 47 | 1 | .920 | 1.96 |
| Alexis Shank | Chicoutimi Saguenéens | 23 | 1383:34 | 14 | 5 | 2 | 2 | 49 | 3 | .918 | 2.12 |
| William Blackburn | Val-d'Or Foreurs | 13 | 763:23 | 9 | 1 | 1 | 1 | 28 | 0 | .907 | 2.20 |
| Nikolas Hurtubise | Victoriaville Tigres | 17 | 904:05 | 10 | 4 | 1 | 0 | 35 | 2 | .914 | 2.32 |

== Playoffs ==
=== Maritimes round-robin ===
Due to local travel restrictions, all Nova Scotia-based teams were deemed ineligible to compete in the playoffs. Three New Brunswick-based teams competed in a six-game round-robin tournament to determine who would face the Charlottetown Islanders in the Maritimes Division final.

— Indicates team advanced to the division final

| Team | GP | W | L | GF | GA | PTS |
|---|---|---|---|---|---|---|
| Acadie–Bathurst Titan | 6 | 4 | 2 | 26 | 25 | 8 |
| Saint John Sea Dogs | 6 | 3 | 3 | 28 | 24 | 6 |
| Moncton Wildcats | 6 | 2 | 4 | 22 | 27 | 4 |

=== Playoff bracket ===
Final results:

First Round
Q1 | Val-d'Or | 3
Q12 | Baie-Comeau | 0
Q2 | Chicoutimi | 3
Q11 | Sherbrooke | 0
Q3 | Shawinigan | 2
Q10 | Rimouski | 3
Q4 | Victoriaville | 3
Q9 | Rouyn-Noranda | 0
Q5 | Blainville-Boisbriand | 3
Q8 | Gatineau | 1
Q6 | Quebec | 3
Q7 | Drummondville | 0

Quarterfinals
Q1 | Val-d'Or | 3
Q10 | Rimouski | 0
Q2 | Chicoutimi | 3
Q6 | Quebec | 0
Q4 | Victoriaville | 3
Q5 | Blainville-Boisbriand | 2
M1 | Charlottetown | 3
M2 | Acadie–Bathurst | 0

Semifinals
1 | Charlottetown | 2
4 | Victoriaville | 3
2 | Val-d'Or | 3
3 | Chicoutimi | 0

Finals
2 | Val-d'Or | 2
4 | Victoriaville | 4

== First round ==
=== Quebec divisions ===
==== (1) Val-d'Or Foreurs vs. (12) Baie-Comeau Drakkar ====
| April 24 | Baie-Comeau Drakkar | 2 – 7 | Val-d'Or Foreurs | Centre Marcel Dionne | Recap |
| Nathaël Roy (1) - 5:36 | | First period | 9:00 - Maxim Čajkovič (1); 14:50 - Justin Robidas (1); 16:54 - Justin Ducharme (1) |
| Brandon Frattaroli (1) - 5:28 | | Second period | 3:13 - Émile Lauzon (1); 8:57 - Thomas Pelletier (1) |
| No scoring | | Third period | 5:29 - pp - Sam Poulin (1); 10:17 - Maxence Guenette (1) |
| Lucas Fitzpatrick (48 saves / 55 shots) | | Goalie stats | Johnathan Lemieux (27 saves / 29 shots) |

| April 25 | Baie-Comeau Drakkar | 2 – 6 | Val-d'Or Foreurs | Centre Marcel Dionne | Recap |
| Brandon Frattaroli (2) - pp - 10:33 | | First period | 5:33 - Jakob Pelletier (1); 14:11 - pp - Maxence Guenette (2) |
| Nathaël Roy (2) - pp - 7:38 | | Second period | 1:00 - Maxim Čajkovič (2); 4:12 - pp - Sam Poulin (2) |
| No scoring | | Third period | 3:39 - Sam Poulin (3); 5:17 - pp - Nathan Légaré (1) |
| Lucas Fitzpatrick (37 saves / 43 shots) | | Goalie stats | Johnathan Lemieux (13 saves / 15 shots) |

| April 27 | Val-d'Or Foreurs | 4 – 1 | Baie-Comeau Drakkar | Centre Marcel Dionne | Recap |
| No scoring | | First period | 14:03 - Andrew Belchamber (1) |
| Nathan Légaré (2) - 9:07; Justin Robidas (2) - 17:22 | | Second period | No scoring |
| Jacob Gaucher (1) - 11:49; Jérémy Michel (1) - 17:23 | | Third period | No scoring |
| Johnathan Lemieux (15 saves / 16 shots) | | Goalie stats | Lucas Fitzpatrick (62 saves / 66 shots) |

| Val-d'Or wins series 3–0 |

==== (2) Chicoutimi Saguenéens vs. (11) Sherbrooke Phoenix ====
| April 23 | Sherbrooke Phoenix | 2 – 4 | Chicoutimi Saguenéens | Centre Georges-Vézina | Recap |
| Joshua Roy (1) - 11:02 | | First period | 10:02 - Matej Kaslik (1); 18:50 - pp - Hendrix Lapierre (1) |
| No scoring | | Second period | No scoring |
| Maxime Blanchard (1) - 0:36 | | Third period | 9:03 - Christophe Farmer (1); 19:33 - en - Dawson Mercer (1) |
| Alexis Shank (13 saves / 15 shots) | | Goalie stats | Samuel Hlavaj (38 saves / 41 shots) |

| April 24 | Sherbrooke Phoenix | 3 – 6 | Chicoutimi Saguenéens | Centre Georges-Vézina | Recap |

| April 26 | Chicoutimi Saguenéens | 7 – 3 | Sherbrooke Phoenix | Centre Georges-Vézina | Recap |

| Chicoutimi wins series 3–0 |

==== (3) Shawinigan Cataractes vs. (10) Rimouski Océanic ====
| April 23 | Rimouski Océanic | 1 – 0 | Shawinigan Cataractes | Centre Gervais Auto | Recap |
| Alex Drover (1) - 6:31 | | First period | No scoring |
| No scoring | | Second period | No scoring |
| No scoring | | Third period | No scoring |
| Creed Jones (35 saves / 35 shots) | | Goalie stats | Antoine Coulombe (23 saves / 24 shots) |

| April 24 | Rimouski Océanic | 1 – 7 | Shawinigan Cataractes | Centre Gervais Auto | Recap |

| April 26 | Shawinigan Cataractes | 5 – 2 | Rimouski Océanic | Centre Gervais Auto | Recap |

| April 28 | Shawinigan Cataractes | 3 – 4 | Rimouski Océanic | Centre Gervais Auto | Recap |

| April 30 | Rimouski Océanic | 2 – 0 | Shawinigan Cataractes | Centre Gervais Auto | Recap |

| Rimouski wins series 3–2 |

==== (4) Victoriaville Tigres vs. (9) Rouyn-Noranda Huskies ====
| April 23 | Rouyn-Noranda Huskies | 2 – 3 | Victoriaville Tigres | Colisée Desjardins | Recap |
| Alex Arsenault (1) - pp - 12:37 | | First period | No scoring |
| Marc-Antoine Séguin (1) - 13:56 | | Second period | 6:31 - pp - Sean Larochelle (1); 12:00 - Shawn Element (1) |
| No scoring | | Third period | 11:00 - Egor Serdyuk (1) |
| Samuel Richard (29 saves / 32 shots) | | Goalie stats | Nikolas Hurtubise (23 saves / 25 shots) |

| April 25 | Rouyn-Noranda Huskies | 3 – 6 | Victoriaville Tigres | Colisée Desjardins | Recap |
| Samuel Johnson (1) - 13:31 | | First period | 9:05 - Conor Frenette (1); 12:38 - Alexis Arsenault (1) |
| Donovan Arsenault (1) - 6:26 | | Second period | 12:39 - pp - Nicolas Daigle (1) |
| Édouard St-Laurent (1) - 17:18 | | Third period | 11:24 - Mikhail Abramov (1); 13:23 - pp - Shawn Element (2); 17:52 - pp - en - Ben Tardif (1) |
| Samuel Richard (24 saves / 29 shots) | | Goalie stats | Nikolas Hurtubise (17 saves / 20 shots) |

| April 26 | Victoriaville Tigres | 1 – 0 | OT | Rouyn-Noranda Huskies | Colisée Desjardins | Recap |
| No scoring | | First period | | No scoring |
| No scoring | | Second period | | No scoring |
| No scoring | | Third period | | No scoring |
| Mikhail Abramov (2) - 1:15 | | First overtime period | | No scoring |
| Nikolas Hurtubise (20 saves / 20 shots) | | Goalie stats | | Samuel Richard (29 saves / 30 shots) |

| Victoriaville wins series 3–0 |

==== (5) Blainville-Boisbriand Armada vs. (8) Gatineau Olympiques ====
| April 28 | Gatineau Olympiques | 6 – 3 | Blainville-Boisbriand Armada | Centre Gervais Auto | Recap |

| April 29 | Gatineau Olympiques | 1 – 6 | Blainville-Boisbriand Armada | Centre Gervais Auto | Recap |

| May 1 | Blainville-Boisbriand Armada | 5 – 2 | Gatineau Olympiques | Centre Gervais Auto | Recap |

| May 3 | Blainville-Boisbriand Armada | 4 – 3 | Gatineau Olympiques | Centre Gervais Auto | Recap |

| Blainville-Boisbriand wins series 3–1 |

==== (6) Quebec Remparts vs. (7) Drummondville Voltigeurs ====
| April 27 | Drummondville Voltigeurs | 3 – 4 | OT | Quebec Remparts | Centre Marcel Dionne | Recap |
| Luke Woodworth (1) - 6:54; Charlie Da Fonseca (1) - 18:45 | | First period | | No scoring |
| Charlie Da Fonseca (2) - 7:44 | | Second period | | 5:02 - James Malatesta (1); 5:54 - Olivier Pouliot (1); 14:05 - Cole Cormier (1) |
| No scoring | | Third period | | No scoring |
| No scoring | | First overtime period | | 10:13 - pp - Viljami Marjala (1) |
| Francesco Lapenna (36 saves / 40 shots) | | Goalie stats | | Thomas Sigouin (32 saves / 35 shots) |

| April 28 | Drummondville Voltigeurs | 2 – 4 | Quebec Remparts | Centre Marcel Dionne | Recap |
| No scoring | | First period | No scoring |
| Charles-Antoine Dumont (1) - 1:14; Tristan Roy (1) - sh - 7:21 | | Second period | 0:58 - James Malatesta (2); 11:09 - Théo Rochette (1); 16:20 - sh - Nathan Gaucher (1) |
| No scoring | | Third period | 8:17 - pp - Gabriel Montreuil (1) |
| Francesco Lapenna (24 saves / 28 shots) | | Goalie stats | Thomas Sigouin (41 saves / 43 shots) |

| April 30 | Quebec Remparts | 5 – 2 | Drummondville Voltigeurs | Centre Marcel Dionne | Recap |
| Olivier Pouliot (2) - 6:31 | | First period | 18:56 - pp - Xavier Simoneau (1) |
| Olivier Pouliot (3) - 18:48 | | Second period | No scoring |
| Nicolas Savoie (1) - pp - 13:48; Thomas Sigouin (1) - en - 15:21; Evan Nause (1) - en - 19:34 | | Third period | 18:27 - Luke Woodworth (2) |
| Thomas Sigouin (36 saves / 38 shots) | | Goalie stats | Francesco Lapenna (28 saves / 31 shots) |

| Quebec wins series 3–0 |

== Quarterfinals ==
=== Quebec Divisions ===
==== (1) Val-d'Or Foreurs vs. (6) Rimouski Océanic ====
| May 7 | Rimouski Océanic | 2 – 6 | Val-d'Or Foreurs | Centre Vidéotron | Recap |

| May 8 | Rimouski Océanic | 0 – 3 | Val-d'Or Foreurs | Centre Vidéotron | Recap |

| May 11 (Note: Postponed from May 10 due to a possible positive case of COVID-19 in the May 8 game between Val-d'Or Foreurs and Rimouski Océanic.) | Val-d'Or Foreurs | 8 – 2 | Rimouski Océanic | Centre Vidéotron | Recap |

| Val-d'Or wins series 3–0 |

==== (2) Chicoutimi Saguenéens vs. (5) Quebec Remparts ====
| May 7 | Quebec Remparts | 0 – 5 | Chicoutimi Saguenéens | Centre Vidéotron | Recap |

| May 9 | Quebec Remparts | 2 – 3 | Chicoutimi Saguenéens | Centre Vidéotron | Recap |

| May 10 | Chicoutimi Saguenéens | 5 – 1 | Quebec Remparts | Centre Vidéotron | Recap |

| Chicoutimi wins series 3–0 |

==== (3) Victoriaville Tigres vs. (4) Blainville-Boisbriand Armada ====
| May 8 | Blainville-Boisbriand Armada | 3 – 2 | OT | Victoriaville Tigres | Centre Vidéotron | Recap |

| May 10 (Note: Postponed from May 9 due to a possible positive case of COVID-19 in the May 8 game between Val-d'Or Foreurs and Rimouski Océanic with the same officials scheduled for the May 9 game.) | Blainville-Boisbriand Armada | 2 – 3 | OT | Victoriaville Tigres | Centre Vidéotron | Recap |

| May 11 | Victoriaville Tigres | 6 – 4 | Blainville-Boisbriand Armada | Centre Vidéotron | Recap |

| May 13 | Victoriaville Tigres | 2 – 3 | Blainville-Boisbriand Armada | Centre Vidéotron | Recap |

| May 15 | Blainville-Boisbriand Armada | 3 – 9 | Victoriaville Tigres | Centre Vidéotron | Recap |

| Victoriaville wins series 3–2 |

=== Maritimes Division ===
==== (1) Charlottetown Islanders vs. (2) Acadie–Bathurst Titan ====
| May 8 | Acadie–Bathurst Titan | 0 – 3 | Charlottetown Islanders | Centre Gervais Auto | Recap |

| May 9 | Acadie–Bathurst Titan | 5 – 7 | Charlottetown Islanders | Centre Gervais Auto | Recap |

| May 11 | Charlottetown Islanders | 2 – 1 | Acadie–Bathurst Titan | Centre Gervais Auto | Recap |

| Charlottetown wins series 3–0 |

== Semifinals ==
=== (1) Charlottetown Islanders vs. (4) Victoriaville Tigres ===
| May 18 | Victoriaville Tigres | 4 – 5 | OT | Charlottetown Islanders | Centre Vidéotron | Recap |

| May 19 | Victoriaville Tigres | 9 – 2 | Charlottetown Islanders | Centre Vidéotron | Recap |

| May 21 | Charlottetown Islanders | 4 – 3 | Victoriaville Tigres | Centre Vidéotron | Recap |

| May 23 | Charlottetown Islanders | 4 – 5 | Victoriaville Tigres | Centre Vidéotron | Recap |

| May 25 | Victoriaville Tigres | 2 – 0 | Charlottetown Islanders | Centre Vidéotron | Recap |

| Victoriaville wins series 3–2 |

=== (2) Val-d'Or Foreurs vs. (3) Chicoutimi Saguenéens ===
| May 17 | Chicoutimi Saguenéens | 2 – 5 | Val-d'Or Foreurs | Centre Vidéotron | Recap |

| May 19 | Chicoutimi Saguenéens | 2 – 4 | Val-d'Or Foreurs | Centre Vidéotron | Recap |

| May 20 | Val-d'Or Foreurs | 6 – 3 | Chicoutimi Saguenéens | Centre Vidéotron | Recap |

| Val-d'Or wins series 3–0 |

== Finals ==
=== (2) Val-d'Or Foreurs vs. (4) Victoriaville Tigres ===
| May 27 | Victoriaville Tigres | 3 – 2 | Val-d'Or Foreurs | Centre Vidéotron | Recap |

| May 29 | Victoriaville Tigres | 1 – 4 | Val-d'Or Foreurs | Centre Vidéotron | Recap |

| May 30 | Val-d'Or Foreurs | 3 – 4 | OT | Victoriaville Tigres | Centre Vidéotron | Recap |

| June 1 | Val-d'Or Foreurs | 4 – 1 | Victoriaville Tigres | Centre Vidéotron | Recap |

| June 3 | Victoriaville Tigres | 3 – 1 | Val-d'Or Foreurs | Centre Vidéotron | Recap |

| June 5 | Val-d'Or Foreurs | 2 – 3 | 2OT | Victoriaville Tigres | Centre Vidéotron | Recap |

| Victoriaville wins series 4–2 |

== Playoff leading scorers ==
Note: GP = Games played; G = Goals; A = Assists; Pts = Points; PIM = Penalties minutes

| Player | Team | GP | G | A | Pts | PIM |
|---|---|---|---|---|---|---|
| Alex Beaucage | Victoriaville Tigres | 16 | 10 | 15 | 25 | 4 |
| Mikhail Abramov | Victoriaville Tigres | 19 | 5 | 19 | 24 | 8 |
| Jakob Pelletier | Val-d'Or Foreurs | 15 | 5 | 18 | 23 | 6 |
| Benjamin Tardif | Victoriaville Tigres | 19 | 11 | 11 | 22 | 12 |
| Jordan Spence | Val-d'Or Foreurs | 15 | 2 | 18 | 20 | 6 |
| Samuel Poulin | Val-d'Or Foreurs | 15 | 11 | 8 | 19 | 12 |
| Shawn Element | Victoriaville Tigres | 19 | 10 | 9 | 19 | 14 |
| Nathan Légaré | Val-d'Or Foreurs | 15 | 14 | 4 | 18 | 12 |
| Maxim Čajkovič | Val-d'Or Foreurs | 15 | 10 | 7 | 17 | 6 |
| Nicolas Daigle | Victoriaville Tigres | 19 | 7 | 10 | 17 | 8 |

== Playoff leading goaltenders ==
Note: GP = Games played; Mins = Minutes played; W = Wins; L = Losses: OTL = Overtime losses; SL = Shootout losses; GA = Goals Allowed; SO = Shutouts; GAA = Goals against average

| Player | Team | GP | Mins | W | L | GA | SO | Sv% | GAA |
|---|---|---|---|---|---|---|---|---|---|
| Antoine Coulombe | Shawinigan Cataractes | 5 | 297:26 | 2 | 3 | 9 | 0 | .930 | 1.82 |
| Jonathan Lemieux | Val d'Or Foreurs | 15 | 924:25 | 11 | 4 | 30 | 1 | .910 | 1.95 |
| Nikolas Hurtubise | Victoriaville Tigres | 16 | 969:02 | 11 | 4 | 41 | 2 | .908 | 2.54 |
| Fabio Iacobo | Victoriaville Tigres | 4 | 216:52 | 2 | 2 | 10 | 0 | .877 | 2.77 |
| Alexis Shank | Chicoutimi Saguenéens | 9 | 537:00 | 6 | 3 | 25 | 1 | .899 | 2.79 |

== Trophies and awards ==
- President's Cup – Playoff Champions: Victoriaville Tigres
- Jean Rougeau Trophy – Regular Season Champions: Charlottetown Islanders
- Luc Robitaille Trophy – Team with the best goals for average: Charlottetown Islanders
- Robert Lebel Trophy – Team with best GAA: Val-d'Or Foreurs

Player

- Michel Brière Memorial Trophy – Most Valuable Player: Cédric Desruisseaux, Charlottetown Islanders
- Jean Béliveau Trophy – Top Scorer: Cédric Desruisseaux, Charlottetown Islanders
- Guy Lafleur Trophy – Playoff MVP: Benjamin Tardif, Victoriaville Tigres
- Jacques Plante Memorial Trophy – Top Goaltender: Colten Ellis, Charlottetown Islanders
- Guy Carbonneau Trophy – Best Defensive Forward: Dawson Mercer, Chicoutimi Saguenéens
- Emile Bouchard Trophy – Defenceman of the Year: Lukas Cormier, Charlottetown Islanders
- Kevin Lowe Trophy – Best Defensive Defenceman: Noah Laaouan, Charlottetown Islanders
- Michael Bossy Trophy – Top Prospect: Zachary Bolduc, Rimouski Océanic
- RDS Cup – Rookie of the Year: Tristan Luneau, Gatineau Olympiques
- Michel Bergeron Trophy – Offensive Rookie of the Year: Antonin Verreault, Gatineau Olympiques
- Raymond Lagacé Trophy – Defensive Rookie of the Year: Tristan Luneau, Gatineau Olympiques
- Frank J. Selke Memorial Trophy – Most sportsmanlike player: Dawson Mercer, Chicoutimi Saguenéens
- QMJHL Humanitarian of the Year – Humanitarian of the Year: Anthony D'Amours, Rimouski Océanic
- Marcel Robert Trophy – Best Scholastic Player: Jacob Gaucher, Val-d'Or Foreurs
- Paul Dumont Trophy – Personality of the Year: Nicolas Sauvé, Blainville-Boisbriand Armada

Executive

- Ron Lapointe Trophy – Coach of the Year: Jim Hulton, Charlottetown Islanders
- Maurice Filion Trophy – General Manager of the Year: Jim Hulton, Charlottetown Islanders

=== All-Star teams ===
First All-Star Team:

- Colten Ellis, Goaltender, Charlottetown Islanders
- Lukas Cormier, Defenceman, Charlottetown Islanders
- Jordan Spence, Defenceman, Val-d'Or Foreurs
- Cédric Desruisseaux, Forward, Charlottetown Islanders
- Dawson Mercer, Forward, Chicoutimi Saguenéens
- Jakob Pelletier, Forward, Val-d'Or Foreurs

Second All-Star Team

- Jonathan Lemieux, Goaltender, Val-d'Or Foreurs
- Noah Laaouan, Defenceman, Charlottetown Islanders
- Justin Barron, Defenceman, Halifax Mooseheads
- Elliot Desnoyers, Forward, Halifax Mooseheads
- Mathieu Desgagnés, Forward, Acadie–Bathurst Titan
- Thomas Casey, Forward, Charlottetown Islanders

All-Rookie Team:

- Chad Arsenault, Goaltender, Acadie–Bathurst Titan
- Tristan Luneau, Defenceman, Gatineau Olympiques
- Evan Nause, Defenceman, Quebec Remparts
- Justin Côté, Forward, Drummondville Voltigeurs
- Peter Reynolds, Forward, Saint John Sea Dogs
- Antonin Verreault, Forward, Gatineau Olympiques

| Preceded by 2019–20 QMJHL season | QMJHL seasons | Succeeded by 2021–22 QMJHL season |
