= Colten Ellis =

Canadian ice hockey player (born 2000)

- Born: October 5, 2000 (age 25) River Denys, Nova Scotia, Canada
- Height: 6 ft 1 in (185 cm)
- Weight: 191 lb (87 kg; 13 st 9 lb)
- Position: Goaltender
- Catches: Left
- NHL team: Buffalo Sabres
- NHL draft: 93rd overall, 2019; St. Louis Blues
- Playing career: 2021–present

Colten Ellis (born October 5, 2000) is a Canadian professional ice hockey player who is a goaltender for the Buffalo Sabres of the National Hockey League (NHL). He was selected 93rd overall by the St. Louis Blues in the third round of the 2019 NHL entry draft.

Born and raised in River Denys, Nova Scotia, Ellis emerged as one of Atlantic Canada's top young goaltenders while playing for the Cape Breton West Islanders, leading the team and province to its first-ever Telus Cup in 2017. Following his performances with the Islanders, he went on to play major junior hockey in the Quebec Major Junior Hockey League (QMJHL) with the Cape Breton Screaming Eagles, the Rimouski Océanic, and the Charlottetown Islanders. During his time in the QMJHL, Ellis made a name for himself, earning defensive rookie of the year and a spot on the all-rookie team his first year. Described as an athletic goalie before the 2019 NHL entry draft, he was selected by the St. Louis Blues with the 93rd overall pick. In his final QMJHL season, he tied the career QMJHL shutout record, broke the best goals-against-average season record, and had the fourth-best season save percentage all time. He was also named the best goaltender of the year and earned a spot on the first all-star team.

After signing an entry-level contract with St. Louis in 2021, Ellis spent several seasons developing within the organization. He began his professional career with the ECHL's Worcester Railers before earning opportunities with the American Hockey League (AHL) Springfield Thunderbirds. Following subpar performance marked by inconsistent play and a mid-season injury that sidelined him for the rest of the 2022–23 season with the ECHL Tulsa Oilers, Ellis rebounded after relearning his love for hockey. In the following seasons, his statistics and play improved, eventually earning the Thunderbirds' starting role. In October 2025, the Blues placed Ellis on waivers, where he was claimed by the Buffalo Sabres. He made his NHL debut later that month, becoming the first goaltender from Cape Breton Island to play in the NHL. Internationally, he has represented the Canada national team.

== Early life ==
Ellis was born in River Denys, Nova Scotia, on October 5, 2000, to Jo-Ann and Brian Ellis as one of three children in the family. He began playing hockey with the Whycocomagh Minor Hockey Association, and had trouble throughout his childhood finding consistent playing time and competition, which his father helped him out with. Ellis has one brother, Matt, and one cousin, Chase, who played in the QMJHL with him.

== Playing career ==
=== Amateur ===
Ellis joined the Nova Junior X-Men of the Nova Scotia Under-15 Major Hockey League in the 2013–14 season as his first step into amateur hockey and stayed for 2014–15, having a 2.08 goals against average (GAA) and a 1.61 GAA respectively. Following the two seasons with the X-Men, he joined the Cape Breton West Islanders of the Nova Scotia Under-18 Major Hockey League for the 2015–16 season, putting up a .890 save percentage and a 3.70 GAA.

Following his performance with the Islanders, the Cape Breton Screaming Eagles selected Ellis in the fourth round of the 2016 Quebec Major Junior Hockey League (QMJHL) entry draft with the 59th overall pick. This was considered a noticeable drop from his expected draft position, with Screaming Eagles scouts surprised that he was still available to pick in the fourth round. He attended the Screaming Eagles training camp but was assigned back to the Islanders. Ellis brought the Islanders to winning the provincial championship, and they were entered into the Atlantic Region Telus Cup qualifier. They beat out the Moncton Flyers to earn themselves a spot in the Telus Cup, where they went on to become the first Nova Scotia team to win the Telus Cup. Ellis performed exceptionally well in the finals and overall, with 43 saves and an overtime breakaway in the final game, along with having a 2.20 GAA and a .929 save percentage in the tournament. Ellis was also called up to the Screaming Eagles throughout the 2016–17 QMJHL season, playing three games with a 2–0–0 record, a 2.50 GAA, and an .885 save percentage. After the end of the 2016–17 season, the Screaming Eagles decided to trade one of their three goaltenders, putting them all on the trade block. On June 3, 2017, Ellis was traded to the Rimouski Océanic for a first-round pick in the 2018 QMJHL entry draft, opting to keep their goaltenders Kyle Jessiman and Kevin Mandolese.

Ellis began the 2017–18 QMJHL season in Rimouski along with goaltender Jimmy Lemay. At the time, Rimouski general manager and head coach Serge Beausoleil did not decide on who would be starting in net for the season, as he wanted to watch and see how they develop in net. Ellis quickly took over the starting role, playing 51 games and leading the Océanic to the QMJHL playoffs. In the QMJHL playoffs, they faced the Moncton Wildcats in the first round, which they lost in seven games. He ended his rookie season in the QMJHL first in wins with 33 and in shutouts with 6. He was also third in goals against average and save percentage, with 2.35 GAA and .913%, respectively. He was nominated for the RDS Cup; the QMJHL rookie of the year, and the Raymond Lagacé Trophy; the defensive rookie of the year. Teammate Alexis Lafrenière won the RDS Cup while Ellis won the Raymond Lagacé Trophy. He was also named to the All-Rookie team and the second All-Star team.

Rimouski continued to have Ellis as the starting goaltender beginning the 2018–19 season. Ellis was one of 40 players selected for the 2019 CHL/NHL Top Prospects Game, intended as a showcase for the 2019 eligible draftees. He played just under 30 minutes in net, saving 15 out of 17 shots on goal. By the end of the season, Ellis was ranked eighth across all North American goaltenders for the 2019 NHL entry draft. In 46 games, he would record a 2.47 GAA and a .910 save percentage. Rimouski entered the 2019 playoffs as the third seed in the eastern conference, beating out the Chicoutimi Saguenéens and the Screaming Eagles before being swept by the Rouyn-Noranda Huskies in the semi-finals; Ellis had played 12 games with a 2.36 GAA and .919 save percentage. Among the media during draft talk, he was described as a very "athletic goalie" but was "moving too much" and "not tracking pucks as well as he could." The St. Louis Blues selected Ellis in the third round with the 93rd overall pick in the 2019 NHL entry draft.

Ellis was returned to Rimouski for the 2019–20 season after being drafted. He played in September and October before sustaining an injury that required surgery, which prevented him from playing in November and December. At the time of his injury, he had played 14 games with a 2.61 GAA and a .905 save percentage. On March 12, the QMJHL season was suspended for a week due to the COVID-19 pandemic and was cancelled for the rest of the season on March 18. Ellis had played 29 games with a 2.41 GAA and a .904 save percentage when the season ended. Following the end of the 2019–20 season, the Charlottetown Islanders traded for Ellis, giving up a 2020 third-round pick, and a 2021 first- and second-round pick.

Despite the effects of the COVID-19 pandemic causing the 2020–21 season for the Ontario Hockey League to be cancelled and the Western Hockey League to start delayed, the 2020–21 QMJHL season continued as normal. Ellis started the season with a spot on the Week 3 QMJHL Team of the Week on October 19, recording a shutout against the Halifax Mooseheads. On March 1, 2021, Ellis signed his three-year, entry-level contract with the Blues, beginning in the 2021–22 NHL season. On March 22, Ellis set the all-time QMJHL record for shutouts by a goaltender with eighteen by shutting out his former team, the Screaming Eagles, 4–0. He was also named Player of the Week the same day, after recording two shutouts that week. By the end of the season, he had seven shutouts, tying the single-season shutout record at the time with seven, held by six goalies, including Hockey Hall of Fame inductee Roberto Luongo. With a record of 23–1–0 with a 1.78 GAA and .926 save percentage, Ellis set the lowest GAA for a season by a goaltender in the QMJHL, and the fourth-best all-time save percentage. For his performance in the regular season, he received the Jacques Plante Memorial Trophy for best goaltender and a spot on the First All-Star team. Ellis led the Islanders to the semi-finals of the playoffs against the Victoriaville Tigres, where they lost the series 2–3.

=== Professional ===
By the 2021–22 season, Ellis had aged out of the QMJHL and began his professional career, participating in the Blues' preseason training camp. After what was described as a "strong showing", he was assigned to the Worcester Railers in the ECHL. He made his professional debut on October 23 against the Maine Mariners in a 4–3 win, saving 42 out of 45 shots on goal. A week later on October 30, he was called up to the American Hockey League (AHL) Springfield Thunderbirds. He made his AHL debut against the Bridgeport Islanders, saving 28 out of 29 shots on goal in a 4–1 win. He was sent down the next day back to the Railers. On December 9, Ellis was called up again to the Thunderbirds, staying with them for almost two months. He was sent down to the Railers for the final time on January 22. In six games on the season with the Thunderbirds, he had recorded a 1–3–2 record, a 3.93 GAA, and a .880 save percentage. On March 18, Ellis recorded his first professional shutout against the South Carolina Stingrays in a 3–0 win, making 23 saves. By the end of the season, he played 34 games with the Railers with a 15–13–5 record, a 3.21 GAA, and a .905 save percentage.

Entering the 2022–23 ECHL season, Ellis participated in the Blues' Traverse City prospect tournament. He did not perform well, giving up nine goals in two starts, being pulled early both times. Ellis, along with Joel Hofer and Vadim Zherenko, made the Thunderbirds opening roster. Despite being on the season-opening roster, Ellis never played a game and was assigned to the ECHL Tulsa Oilers on October 29. Ellis took over the Oilers starting goaltender following his reassignment. With the Oilers, he started suffering issues with his hip beginning in December and had season-ending hip surgery in February. At the time of surgery, he had finished the season with a 12–9–5 record, 3.46 GAA, and an .888 save percentage in 27 games. Ellis began his recovery period and was back on the ice in June. While recovering from his injury, Ellis had relearned his love of hockey and "re-modelled [his] game and took a look at what [he] needed to do to have some success".

Prior to the 2023–24 ECHL season, Ellis participated in the Blues' training camp, where he suffered a concussion. He ended up being assigned to the Orlando Solar Bears to start the season. Following an impressive performance with a record of 5–0–0 with one shutout, a 1.58 GAA, and a .954 save percentage, Ellis was named ECHL Goaltender of the Month for December. He was also named ECHL Goaltender of the Week ending December 23 with 2 wins, a 1.00 GAA, and a .973 save percentage. After Thunderbirds goalie Vadim Zherenko suffered an injury in January, Ellis was called up to the Thunderbirds on the 21st, playing 13 games and recording a 2.86 GAA and a .926 save percentage while Zherenko was out. Following Zherenko's return from injury, the Thunderbirds rotated him, Zherenko, and Malcolm Subban in net before Subban was traded in March to the Columbus Blue Jackets. Following the trade, Zherenko and Ellis became the Thunderbirds goaltender tandem and were in net for the rest of the season, playing three more games for a season total 2.89 GAA and .924 save percentage. Ellis credited Subban for his better performance in Springfield throughout the year. On June 11, Ellis signed a one-year, two-way contract extension worth $775,000 with the Blues.

Ellis started the 2024–25 season by participating again in the Blues' training camp, where he would be assigned to the Thunderbirds to start the season. Despite Zherenko starting in the Thunderbirds net on opening night, he quickly took over as the team's starting goaltender, playing 8 out of the 12 games from the start of the season to mid-November with a .919 save percentage and a 2.80 GAA between that time period. Following his strong start to the AHL season, he continued to be the Thunderbirds' starting goaltender. On March 6, Ellis signed a two-year, two-way contract extension worth $1.55 million with the Blues. Four days later, he was named AHL Player of the Week ending March 9 with a shutout, 95 saves, a 0.72 GAA, and a .979 save percentage. By the end of the season, he had played 42 games with a 22–14–5 record, a 2.63 GAA, and a .922 save percentage. The Thunderbirds entered the 2025 Calder Cup playoffs as the A6 seed paired against the A3 seed Providence Bruins, a series they would lose in three; he recorded a 2.32 GAA and a .933 save percentage. Following the Calder Cup playoffs, Ellis was called up to the Blues on April 28, but did not appear in any Stanley Cup playoff games.

Before the start of the 2025–26 NHL season on October 5, the Blues put Ellis on waivers to be put on assignment back to Springfield as Jordan Binnington and Joel Hofer were expected to be the starter and backup, respectively. After impressive preseason play which caught the attention of Buffalo Sabres head coach Lindy Ruff, he was claimed by the Sabres the next day, putting him and Alexandar Georgiev in contention for the backup spot to start the season behind Alex Lyon. Georgiev was waived the following day, making Ellis the backup to Lyon to start the season. Ellis made his NHL debut on October 22 in a 4–2 win against the Detroit Red Wings, saving 27 out of 29 shots on goal. With his debut, he became the first goaltender from Cape Breton Island to play in the NHL, the eighth from Nova Scotia, and the ninth Sabres goaltender to win in their debut. On April 9, Ellis recorded his first career shutout in a 5–0 win over the Columbus Blue Jackets.

== International play ==
For the 2018 IIHF World U18 Championships, Ellis and Olivier Rodrigue were selected as the team's goaltenders. He started the first two round-robin games against the United States and Belarus, recording a 3.50 GAA and a .887 save percentage. Rodrigue took over the starting goaltender role and Team Canada continued in quarterfinals play, where they lost to the Czech Republic.

Ellis was contention for the 2020 World Junior Ice Hockey Championships roster for Canada, participating in what was considered an average summer showcase, but did not make the December camp roster cut.

On December 20, 2024, Hockey Canada announced their roster for the 2024 Spengler Cup, which selected Ellis and Antoine Bibeau as the goaltenders. At the time of his selection, he had an 8–4–2 record with a 2.70 GAA and a .918 save percentage. He started the tournament in net against HC Davos, recording 25 saves in a 6–2 win. Ellis continued to be the starting goaltender for Team Canada, playing two more games before losing to the Straubing Tigers in the semifinals. He finished the tournament with a second-best 2.68 GAA and a .911 save percentage, only behind HC Davos goaltender Luca Hollenstein.

== Career statistics ==
=== Regular season and playoffs ===
			Regular season									Playoffs
Season	Team	League	GP	W	L	OT	MIN	GA	SO	GAA	SV%	GP	W	L	MIN	GA	SO	GAA	SV%
2016–17	Cape Breton Screaming Eagles	QMJHL	3	2	0	0	144	6	0	2.50	.885	—	—	—	—	—	—	—	—
2017–18	Rimouski Océanic	QMJHL	51	33	8	6	2,836	111	6	2.35	.913	7	3	4	403	21	0	3.12	.885
2018–19	Rimouski Océanic	QMJHL	46	27	15	2	2,649	109	3	2.47	.910	12	8	4	737	29	1	2.36	.919
2019–20	Rimouski Océanic	QMJHL	29	18	7	3	1,691	68	2	2.41	.904	—	—	—	—	—	—	—	—
2020–21	Charlottetown Islanders	QMJHL	24	23	1	0	1,448	43	7	1.78	.926	8	5	3	443	23	1	3.11	.863
2021–22	Springfield Thunderbirds	AHL	6	1	3	2	351	23	0	3.93	.880	—	—	—	—	—	—	—	—
2021–22	Worcester Railers	ECHL	34	15	13	5	2,017	108	1	3.21	.905	—	—	—	—	—	—	—	—
2022–23	Tulsa Oilers	ECHL	27	12	9	5	1,528	88	0	3.46	.888	—	—	—	—	—	—	—	—
2023–24	Springfield Thunderbirds	AHL	16	7	9	0	956	46	0	2.89	.924	—	—	—	—	—	—	—	—
2023–24	Orlando Solar Bears	ECHL	21	12	5	1	1,151	47	1	2.45	.923	—	—	—	—	—	—	—	—
2024–25	Springfield Thunderbirds	AHL	42	22	14	5	2,420	106	3	2.63	.922	3	1	2	181	7	0	2.32	.933
2025–26	Buffalo Sabres	NHL	16	8	4	2	911	44	1	2.90	.903	—	—	—	—	—	—	—	—
NHL totals			16	8	4	2	911	44	1	2.90	.903	—	—	—	—	—	—	—	—

=== International ===
Year	Team	Event	Result	GP	W	L	T	MIN	GA	SO	GAA	SV%
2018	Canada	U18	5th	2	2	0	0	120	7	0	3.50	.887
Junior totals				2	2	0	0	120	7	0	3.50	.887

== Awards and honours ==
Award	Year	Ref
QMJHL
Raymond Lagacé Trophy	2018	
All-Rookie Team	2018	
Second All-Star Team	2018	
Jacques Plante Memorial Trophy	2021	
First All-Star Team	2021	
