= Jordan Spence (ice hockey) =

Japanese and Canadian ice hockey player (born 2001)

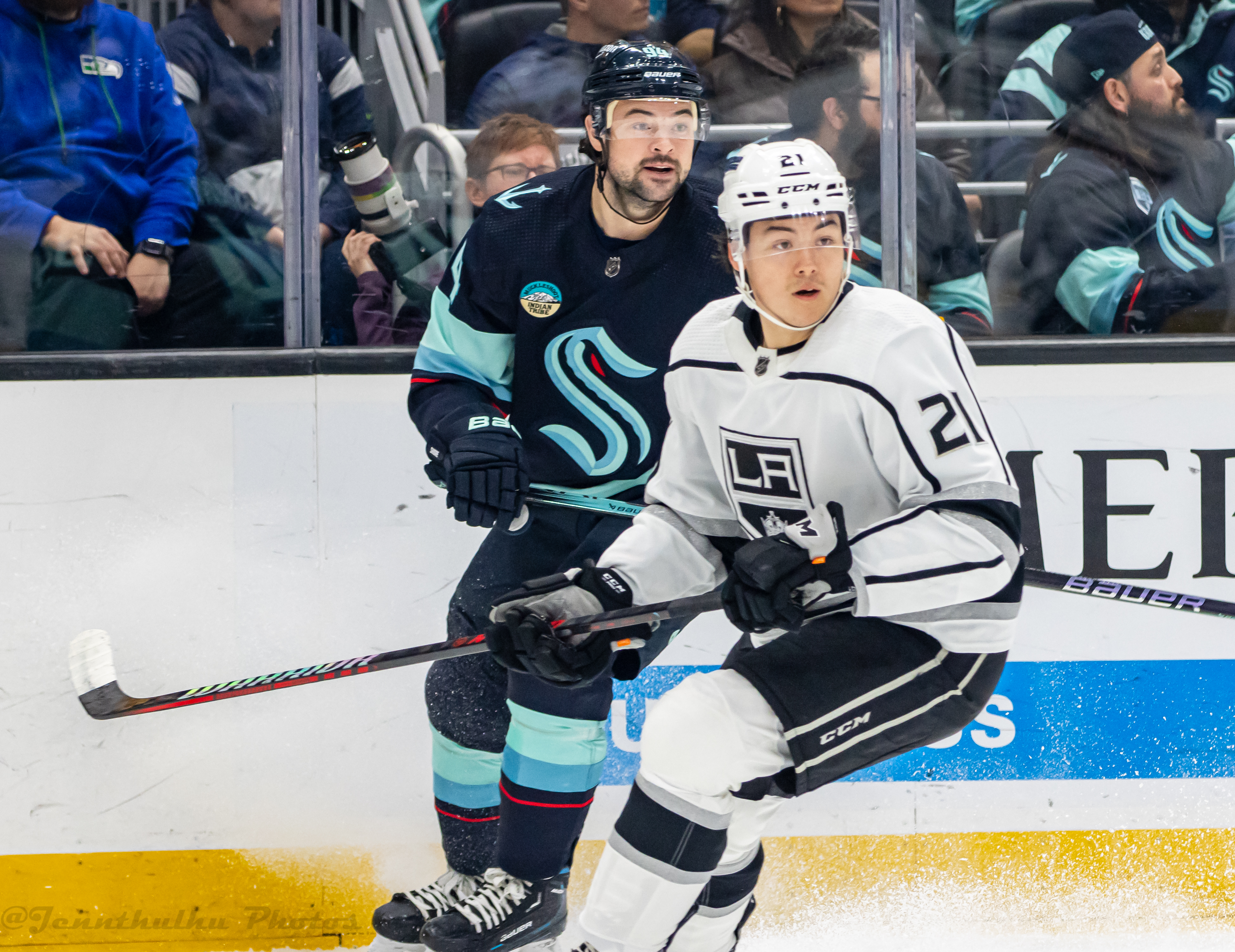
- Spence with the Los Angeles Kings in 2023
- Born: February 24, 2001 (age 25) Manly, New South Wales, Australia
- Height: 5 ft 10 in (178 cm)
- Weight: 188 lb (85 kg; 13 st 6 lb)
- Position: Defence
- Shoots: Right
- NHL team Former teams: Ottawa Senators; Los Angeles Kings
- NHL draft: 95th overall, 2019; Los Angeles Kings
- Playing career: 2021–present

Jordan Spence (born February 24, 2001) is an Australian-born Japanese-Canadian professional ice hockey player who is a defenceman for the Ottawa Senators of the National Hockey League (NHL). He was drafted in the fourth round, 95th overall, of the 2019 NHL entry draft by the Los Angeles Kings.

== Playing career ==
=== Amateur ===
Spence played minor ice hockey with the Summerside Western Capitals of the Maritime Junior Hockey League. He went undrafted in 2017, but after leading all rookie scoring and finishing third on his team, he was selected by the Moncton Wildcats of the Quebec Major Junior Hockey League (QMJHL) in the second round, 20th overall, of the 2018 QMJHL entry draft. In his first season with the Wildcats in 2018–19, he recorded six goals and 43 assists for 49 points in 68 games. He established new records for the Wildcats with assists and points in a season by a rookie defenceman. The Wildcats qualified for the playoffs, but were eliminated in the second round by the Halifax Mooseheads. In four playoff games, Spence recorded one goal and four points. Spence was named the league's Raymond Lagacé Trophy as defensive rookie of the year, to the All-Rookie Team, and Rookie of the Year.

He returned to Moncton for the 2019–20 season and helped lead the team to the top of Eastern Conference before the season was cut short by the COVID-19 pandemic. He tallied nine goals and 52 points in 60 games before the season was cancelled on March 17, 2020. On May 20, it was announced that Spence had been awarded the Emile Bouchard Trophy as the league's top defenceman. He was also named to the QMJHL's First All-Star Team alongside teammate Alexander Khovanov.

Spence began the pandemic-shortened 2020–21 season with the Wildcats and was named an alternate captain. After appearing in 13 games with the Wildcats, registering five goals and 16 points, he was traded to the Val-d'Or Foreurs in exchange for goaltender Vincent Fillion and two draft picks. He appeared in 19 games with the Foreurs, scoring five goals and 24 points. The Foreurs qualified for the playoffs but were knocked out of contention in the third round by the Victoriaville Tigres. In 15 playoff games, Spence added two goals and 20 points. He was named to the QMJHL's 2021 First All-Star Team alongside teammate Jakob Pelletier.

=== Professional ===
==== Los Angeles Kings ====
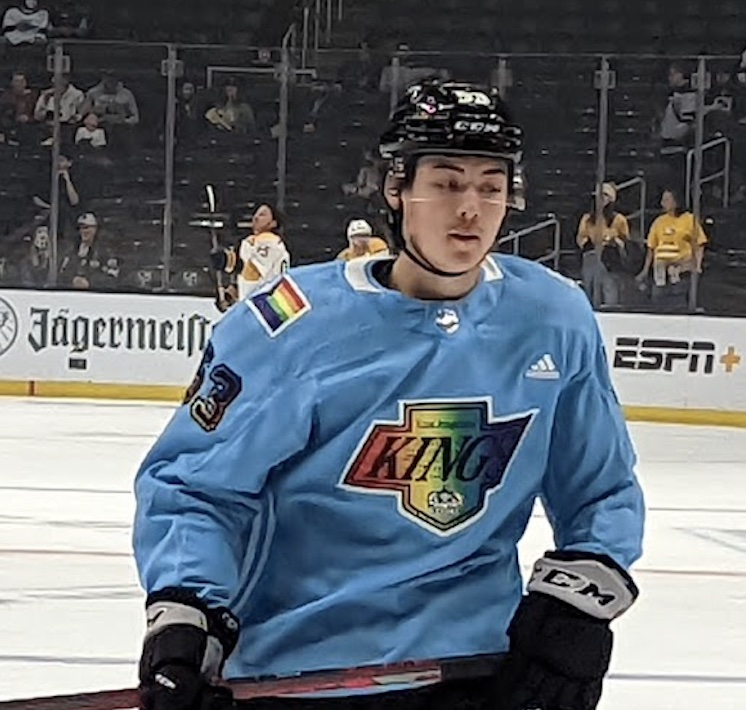
Spence skating in warm-ups on the Los Angeles Kings pride night for the 2021–22 season.

Spence was drafted by the Los Angeles Kings of the National Hockey League (NHL) in the fourth round, 95th overall, of the 2019 NHL entry draft. On June 3, 2020, the Kings signed Spence to a three-year, entry-level contract. Spence joined the Kings' American Hockey League (AHL) affiliate, the Ontario Reign, to begin the 2021–22 season. He was recalled on December 17, 2021, by the Kings, but did not play any games before being returned to Ontario. He was recalled on March 9, 2022, after Mikey Anderson was injured. In 46 games with the Reign, he scored four goals and 42 points. He made his NHL debut with the Kings on March 10, as the first skater with Japanese citizenship to play in the NHL. He tallied his first NHL point on March 13, when he assisted on Rasmus Kupari's first period goal in a 3–2 victory over the Florida Panthers. On March 26, Spence scored his first career NHL goal in a 4–2 win over the Seattle Kraken. He remained with the Kings for the remainder of the season, in which the Kings qualified for the playoffs finishing third in their division. In 24 regular season games, he recorded two goals and eight points. In their first round series with the Edmonton Oilers, Spence made his NHL playoff debut on May 2, playing on the third defence pairing with Olli Määttä. The Kings won the game 4–3, but eventually lost the series. Spence, who had no points through the first three games of the best-of-seven series, was replaced by Troy Stecher in the lineup beginning in game four. He was named to the AHL's All-Rookie Team and First All-Star Team at season's end.

He was assigned to the Reign to begin the 2022–23 season before being recalled on December 12. He made his NHL season debut on December 17 in a 3–2 shootout win over the San Jose Sharks. He recorded his only point of the season in a 5–2 victory over the Colorado Avalanche on March 9, 2023, assisting on Phillip Danault's third period goal. In six games with the Kings over multiple recalls, he tallied just the one point. He the remainder of the season with Ontario, recording four goals and 45 points in 56 games. The Reign qualified for the playoffs after finishing sixth in their division, and faced the Colorado Eagles first. The Eagles swept them in their best-of-three series. In the two games, Spence marked one assist.

Spence became a full-time member of the Kings in the 2023–24 season, recording two goals and 24 points in 71 games. He had a brief one-game stint with Ontario in February before swiftly being recalled to replace the injured Mikey Anderson. The Kings made the playoffs and once again faced the Oilers in the first round. He recorded his NHL playoff point on April 24, 2024, assisting on Kevin Fiala's third period goal in a 4–3 victory. The Oilers eliminated the Kings for the third consecutive year. In five playoff games, he tallied the one assist.

On August 1, the Kings re-signed Spence to a two-year, $3 million contract. Going into the 2024–25 season it was expected that with the departure of Matt Roy, Spence would move up to the second pairing alongside Vladislav Gavrikov. He played 79 games, marking four goals and 28 points with solid defensive play. The Kings faced the Oilers again in the playoffs and once again, were eliminated by Edmonton. Despite playing regularly during the season, in the playoffs Spence saw his ice time cut nearly in half and was scratched for one of the games, for which the Kings were criticized. He tallied his first NHL playoff goal on May 1 in the elimination game. In five playoff games, he recorded the one goal. In the offseason, new Kings general manager Ken Holland and Spence could not agree on playing time guarantees and as a result, Spence was made available for trade.

==== Ottawa Senators ====
On June 28, 2025, at the 2025 NHL entry draft, Spence was traded by the Kings to the Ottawa Senators in exchange for a 2025 third-round pick and a 2026 sixth-round pick. He made his Senators debut on October 13, paired with Tyler Kleven in a 4–1 defeat to the Nashville Predators. He scored his first goal with Ottawa on November 9 in a 4–2 win over the Utah Mammoth. In the second half of the season, both of the Senators' top defencemen, Jake Sanderson and Thomas Chabot, went down with injury and Spence was asked to take on more responsibility. He responded well and saw his ice time increase. He finished the season with seven goals and 31 points in 73 games. The Senators made the playoffs and faced the Carolina Hurricanes in the opening round. The Senators were swept in the first round by the Hurricanes.

On June 26, 2026, Spence signed a four-year extension with the Senators.

== International play ==
Medal record

Representing Canada

Ice hockey

World Junior Championships
Silver medal – second place	2021 Canada	

Spence was selected to play for Canada's junior team at the 2021 World Junior Championships. He made two appearances in the tournament, scoring his only goal in a 3–1 victory over Slovakia. The team advanced to the gold medal game where they lost to the United States, earning the silver medal.

== Personal life ==
Spence was born in Manly, New South Wales, Australia, to a Canadian father, Adam, and a Japanese mother, Kyoko. He lived in Australia briefly before moving to Osaka, Japan, where he first played baseball, as well as hockey under the tutelage of his father. At the age of 13, he and his family moved to Cornwall, Prince Edward Island, Canada. At that time, he had a "limited command" of English. Before his 20th birthday he was a dual citizen of Canada and Japan. He speaks English, French, and Japanese.

== Career statistics ==
=== Regular season and playoffs ===
			Regular season					Playoffs
Season	Team	League	GP	G	A	Pts	PIM	GP	G	A	Pts	PIM
2017–18	Summerside Western Capitals	MJAHL	50	13	38	51	16	12	4	13	17	18
2018–19	Moncton Wildcats	QMJHL	68	6	43	49	18	4	1	3	4	0
2019–20	Moncton Wildcats	QMJHL	60	9	43	52	28	—	—	—	—	—
2020–21	Moncton Wildcats	QMJHL	13	5	11	16	14	—	—	—	—	—
2020–21	Val d'Or Foreurs	QMJHL	19	5	19	24	0	15	2	18	20	6
2021–22	Ontario Reign	AHL	46	4	38	42	28	—	—	—	—	—
2021–22	Los Angeles Kings	NHL	24	2	6	8	2	3	0	0	0	0
2022–23	Ontario Reign	AHL	56	4	41	45	34	2	0	1	1	2
2022–23	Los Angeles Kings	NHL	6	0	1	1	0	—	—	—	—	—
2023–24	Los Angeles Kings	NHL	71	2	22	24	12	5	0	1	1	0
2023–24	Ontario Reign	AHL	1	0	0	0	2	—	—	—	—	—
2024–25	Los Angeles Kings	NHL	79	4	24	28	16	5	1	0	1	0
2025–26	Ottawa Senators	NHL	73	7	24	31	22	4	0	0	0	2
NHL totals			253	15	77	92	52	17	1	1	2	2

=== International ===
Year	Team	Event	Result	GP	G	A	Pts	PIM
2019	Canada	U18	4th	7	1	2	3	0
2021	Canada	WJC	2nd place, silver medalist(s)	2	1	0	1	0
Junior totals				9	2	2	4	0

== Awards and honours ==
Award	Year
QMJHL
Raymond Lagacé Trophy	2019
All-Rookie Team	2019
Rookie of the Year	2019
Emile Bouchard Trophy	2020
First All-Star Team	2020, 2021
AHL
All-Rookie Team	2022
First All-Star Team	2022

== Sources ==
- Chaimovitch, Jason, ed. (2025). 2025–2026 American Hockey League Official Guide & Record Book. Springfield, Massachusetts: American Hockey League. OCLC 22147888.
