= Dominique Cormier =

Canadian ice hockey player

- Born: October 11, 2003 (age 23) Sainte-Marie, New Brunswick, Canada
- Height: 169 cm (5 ft 7 in)
- Position: Defence
- Shoots: Left
- NCAA team Former teams: Princeton Tigers; Stanstead Spartans
- Playing career: 2021–present

Dominique Cormier (born October 11, 2003) is a Canadian ice hockey defenceman, who played with the Princeton Tigers women's ice hockey team in the ECAC Hockey conference of the NCAA Division I.

== Career ==
Cormier began skating at the age of four, originally playing ringette before beginning hockey at the age of five. She played on the same teams as her older brother, occasionally serving on the same defensive pairing together, until the peewee AAA level. During high school, she attended Stanstead College, playing for the school's girls' hockey programme.

In December 2020, she announced that she had committed to attending Princeton University, joining their NCAA women's hockey programme beginning in 2021.

== International career ==
She was first selected for junior international duty at the age of 15, representing Canada at the U18 summer series against the United States in 2019. She narrowly missed the cut for the 2020 IIHF World Women's U18 Championship Canadian roster. She then became one of four returning players invited to the 2020 Team Canada U18 Summer Camp in preparation for the 2021 IIHF World Women's U18 Championship, before the championships were cancelled due to the COVID-19 pandemic.

== Personal life ==
Her brother, Lukas Cormier, was drafted 68th overall by the Vegas Golden Knights in the 2020 NHL entry draft.
