= Tristan Luneau =

Canadian ice hockey player (born 2004)

- Born: January 12, 2004 (age 22) Victoriaville, Quebec
- Height: 6 ft 1 in (185 cm)
- Weight: 211 lb (96 kg; 15 st 1 lb)
- Position: Defence
- Shoots: Right
- NHL team: Anaheim Ducks
- NHL draft: 53rd overall, 2022; Anaheim Ducks
- Playing career: 2023–present

Tristan Luneau (born January 12, 2004) is a Canadian professional ice hockey defenceman for the Anaheim Ducks of the National Hockey League (NHL).

== Playing career ==
Luneau played ice hockey for the Estacades de Trois-Rivières starting at age 14, competing against those several years older than him as they were an under-18 team. He was team captain as a 15 and 16-year old, being named the Quebec minor league defenceman of the year while scoring 30 points in 37 games. He committed to play collegiately for the Wisconsin Badgers but retracted his commitment after he was selected with the first overall pick in the Quebec Major Junior Hockey League (QMJHL) by the Gatineau Olympiques.

In the 2020–21 season, his first with the Olympiques, Luneau appeared in 31 games and posted four goals and a total of 18 points, being named defensive rookie of the year. In 2021–22, he played a combined total of 70 games and had 49 points, including 12 goals scored. He was invited to the CHL/NHL Top Prospects Game and was an alternate captain. After the season, he was selected by the Anaheim Ducks of the National Hockey League (NHL) 53rd overall in the 2022 NHL entry draft. Luneau returned to the Olympiques for the 2022–23 season and was given the Emile Bouchard Trophy as the best defenceman in the QMJHL; he led all defencemen in the league with 83 points in the regular season and then scored 17 more in the postseason.

On September 5, 2023, Luneau signed a three-year, entry-level contract with the Anaheim Ducks. He made the team's opening roster out of training camp. Luneau made his NHL debut in a 3–2 loss to the Dallas Stars on October 19 playing alongside Cam Fowler. On November 3, Luneau was assigned to the Ducks American Hockey League (AHL) affiliate, the San Diego Gulls. He collected his first professional point against the Coachella Valley Firebirds on November 8. He was recalled by Anaheim on November 17 after appearing in six games with San Diego. Luneau scored his first NHL goal against Darcy Kuemper in a 5–4 loss to the Washington Capitals on November 30. Luneau developed a viral infection while practicing for the Canadian national junior team in December, and as a result of this he ultimately missed the remainder of the 2023–24 season.

Following his recovery, Luneau appeared in six games with the Ducks during the 2024–25 season, but spent most of the year with the Gulls in the AHL. He led both the team and rookies league-wide in assists, and recorded an eleven-game assist streak, the first in the AHL in three years. He was named to the AHL All-Rookie Team.

== International play ==
Luneau represented Canada at the 2020 Winter Youth Olympics and was an alternate captain. Luneau missed out on making Team Canada for the 2024 World Juniors after suffering a viral infection. He was replaced by Jorian Donovan.

== Personal life ==
Luneau was born on January 12, 2004, in Victoriaville, Quebec. Both of his parents were athletes and his three older brothers played sports as well.

== Career statistics ==
			Regular season					Playoffs
Season	Team	League	GP	G	A	Pts	PIM	GP	G	A	Pts	PIM
2018–19	Trois-Rivières Estacades	QMAAA	42	4	20	24	16	—	—	—	—	—
2019–20	Trois-Rivières Estacades	QMAAA	37	6	24	30	22	5	2	3	5	4
2020–21	Gatineau Olympiques	QMJHL	31	4	14	18	2	4	0	1	1	0
2021–22	Gatineau Olympiques	QMJHL	63	12	31	43	20	7	0	6	6	4
2022–23	Gatineau Olympiques	QMJHL	65	20	63	83	31	13	2	15	17	6
2023–24	Anaheim Ducks	NHL	7	1	2	3	4	—	—	—	—	—
2023–24	San Diego Gulls	AHL	6	0	2	2	2	—	—	—	—	—
2024–25	Anaheim Ducks	NHL	6	0	0	0	2	—	—	—	—	—
2024–25	San Diego Gulls	AHL	59	9	43	52	21	—	—	—	—	—
2025–26	San Diego Gulls	AHL	70	10	31	41	29	2	0	0	0	2
2025–26	Anaheim Ducks	NHL	1	1	0	1	0	—	—	—	—	—
NHL totals			14	2	2	4	6	—	—	—	—	—

== Awards and honours ==
Award	Year	Ref
QMJHL
Raymond Lagacé Trophy	2021	
RDS Cup	2021	
All-Rookie Team	2021	
Emile Bouchard Trophy	2023	
First All-Star Team	2023	
AHL
All-Rookie Team	2025	
