= Jakob Pelletier =

Canadian ice hockey player (born 2001)

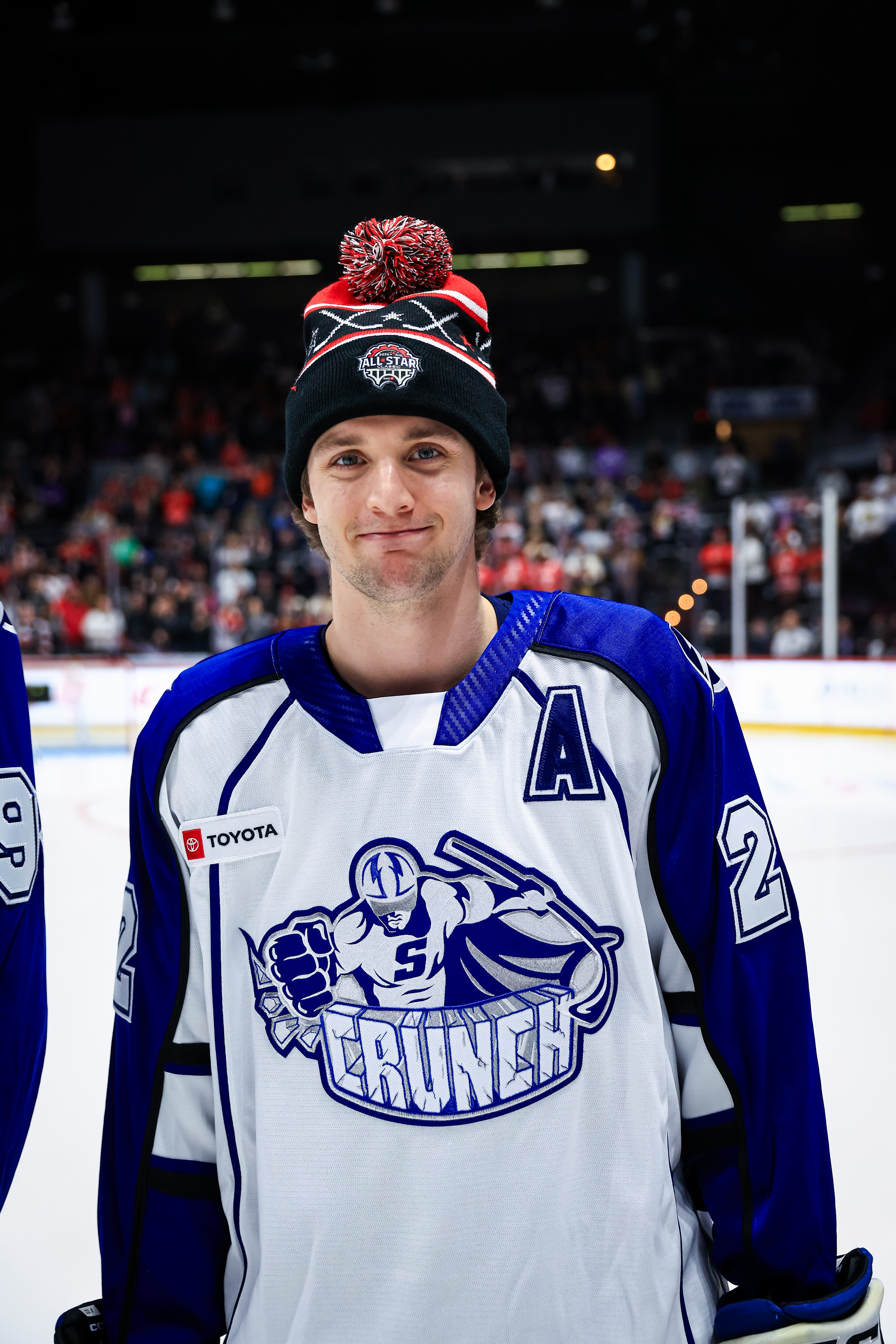
- Pelletier with the Syracuse Crunch in 2026
- Born: March 7, 2001 (age 25) Quebec City, Quebec, Canada
- Height: 5 ft 10 in (178 cm)
- Weight: 172 lb (78 kg; 12 st 4 lb)
- Position: Left wing
- Shoots: Left
- NHL team (P) Cur. team Former teams: Tampa Bay Lightning; Syracuse Crunch (AHL); Calgary Flames; Philadelphia Flyers
- NHL draft: 26th overall, 2019; Calgary Flames
- Playing career: 2021–present

Jakob Pelletier (born March 7, 2001) is a Canadian professional ice hockey left winger for the Syracuse Crunch in the American Hockey League (AHL) while under contract to the Tampa Bay Lightning of the National Hockey League (NHL). He was selected by the Calgary Flames with the 26th overall pick in the 2019 NHL entry draft.

== Early life ==
Pelletier was born in Quebec City, Quebec, Canada, to parents Mario and Nancy. Pelletier began skating at the age of three and spent one season playing alongside his older brother Thomas at the novice level despite Thomas being three years older.

== Playing career ==
=== Amateur ===
Pelletier participated in the 2011 Brick Hockey Invitational Hockey Tournament with the Montreal Ice Storm and later led the Citadelles de Québec to victory in the 2013 Quebec International Pee-Wee Hockey Tournament. He scored three goals and one assist during the championship game and was subsequently named Player of the Game. During the 2015–16 season, Pelletier captained the Typhon du SSF-Québec Bantam AAA team while tallying 50 points over 31 games. He then joined the Blizzard du Séminaire Saint-François in the Ligue de développement du hockey M18 AAA (LHMAAAQ) for the 2016–17 season. In his first 15 games with the team, he ranked fourth in the league with nine goals and 22 points. He continued to score throughout the season and finished with 25 goals and 32 assists for 57 points while the Blizzard's ranked first in the league with a 29–8–3 regular season record. During the Blizzard's 2017 playoff run, Pelletier collected 15 goals and 14 assists for 29 points over 17 games as he led the team to the championships. His final goal of the tournament was the game-winner to lead the team over the Estacades de Trois-Rivières. Pelletier was recognized with the Trophée Clement-Filion as LHMAAAQ playoff MVP. Pelletier also received the Trophée Patrice-Bergeron as the league's most sportsmanlike player and was named to the LHMAAAQ First All-Star Team. Following their win, the Blizzard's participated in the 2017 Telus Cup midget hockey national championships. Pelletier scored the game-winning goal over the Regina Pat Canadians to lead the team to the Telus Cup gold-medal game. He finished the tournament with three goals and seven assists as the Blizzard's earned a silver medal.

=== QMJHL ===
As a result of his dominating season, Pelletier was drafted third overall by the Moncton Wildcats in the 2017 Quebec Major Junior Hockey League draft. After he officially signed his contract with the team, the Wildcats Director of Hockey Operations, Roger Shannon said: "He is a big part of the future for the Moncton Wildcats, and a person who makes everyone around him better. His enthusiasm and passion is contagious, and he does everything to the absolute best of his ability." Although he wore jersey number 22 when he was younger, Pelletier was forced to switch upon joining the Wildcats as the number had been retired. Pelletier made an immediate impact on the Wildcats once the 2017–18 season started by scoring 4 goals and 7 assists in his first nine games. By the end of October, Pelletier had added nine more points to his total and ranked second in points among all rookies in the league. As a result, he was named an honourable mention for Rookie of the Month of October. While skating alongside Mika Cyr and Jeremy McKenna, Pelletier continued to be a physical and offensive force for the Wildcats. By February, he ranked second on the team in scoring with 47 points over 44 games. He finished his rookie season with 23 goals and 38 assists for 61 points as the Wildcats qualified for the 2018 President Cup. As a result of his overall play, Pelletier was named to the QMJHL All-Rookie Team.

During the 2018 off-season, Pelletier was named to Team Canada's U18 team for the 2018 Hlinka Gretzky Cup. He scored his first goal of the tournament in Team Canada's first game to help lead the team 10–0 over Switzerland. Pelletier finished the tournament with one goal and one assist for two points as Team Canada won a gold medal. Due to an injury sustained during the off-season, Pelletier had a delayed start to the 2018–19 season. Despite this delay, he tallied nine goals and 16 assists through 15 games and was named the QMJHL's Forward of the Month of October. By January, Pelletier ranked 10th in the league in scoring with 25 goals and 35 assists. Pelletier's continuous offensive output earned him a spot on Team Cherry for the 2019 CHL/NHL Top Prospects Game. Pelletier finished the regular season with a career-high 39 goals and 50 assists for 89 points while the Wildcats finished fourth in the Maritimes Division with a 38–21–4–5 record. During the opening game of the 2019 playoffs, Pelletier suffered an ankle injury and sat out the next five games. He returned for Game 6 despite still being injured and subsequently scored the game-winning goal. Although the Wildcats were swept in the second round, Pelletier finished the playoffs with two goals and one assist over seven games. Despite being advised to skip the IIHF World U18 Championship due to his ankle, Pelletier still chose to represent Team Canada at the 2019 IIHF World U18 Championships where he accumulated two points.

Leading up to the 2019 NHL entry draft, Pelletier was ranked 27th among all North American skaters by the NHL Central Scouting Bureau. He was also praised by Troy Dumville of NHL Central Scouting who called him "the smartest player on the board from the Quebec Major Junior Hockey League." However, Pelletier was only ranked 40th by Corey Pronman of The Athletic in part due to his skating abilities. Pelletier was eventually drafted in the first round, 26th overall, by the Calgary Flames. Following the draft, Pelletier participated in the Flames' 2019 Development Camp. He signed a three-year entry-level contract with the team on September 23, before being reassigned back to the QMJHL.

The 2019–20 season would prove to be Pelletier's shortest and last season with the Wildcats. Although he was selected to represent Team Canada at the 2020 World Junior Ice Hockey Championships, a concussion prevented him from playing in the tournament. Prior to the concussion, on December 28, Pelletier recorded his 200th career regular-season point in his 152nd QMJHL game. Pelletier returned to Wildcats lineup once the league returned to play following the Christmas break. When the league concluded the season early due to the COVID-19 pandemic, Pelletier had accumulated 32 goals and 50 assists for 82 points over 57 games. As he had only accumulated eight minor penalties over that period, he was named the recipient of the Frank J. Selke Memorial Trophy as the most sportsmanlike player in the QMJHL. On June 5, after three full seasons with the Moncton Wildcats, Pelletier was traded to the Val-d'Or Foreurs in exchange for Mattias Cloutier and draft picks.

=== Calgary Flames ===
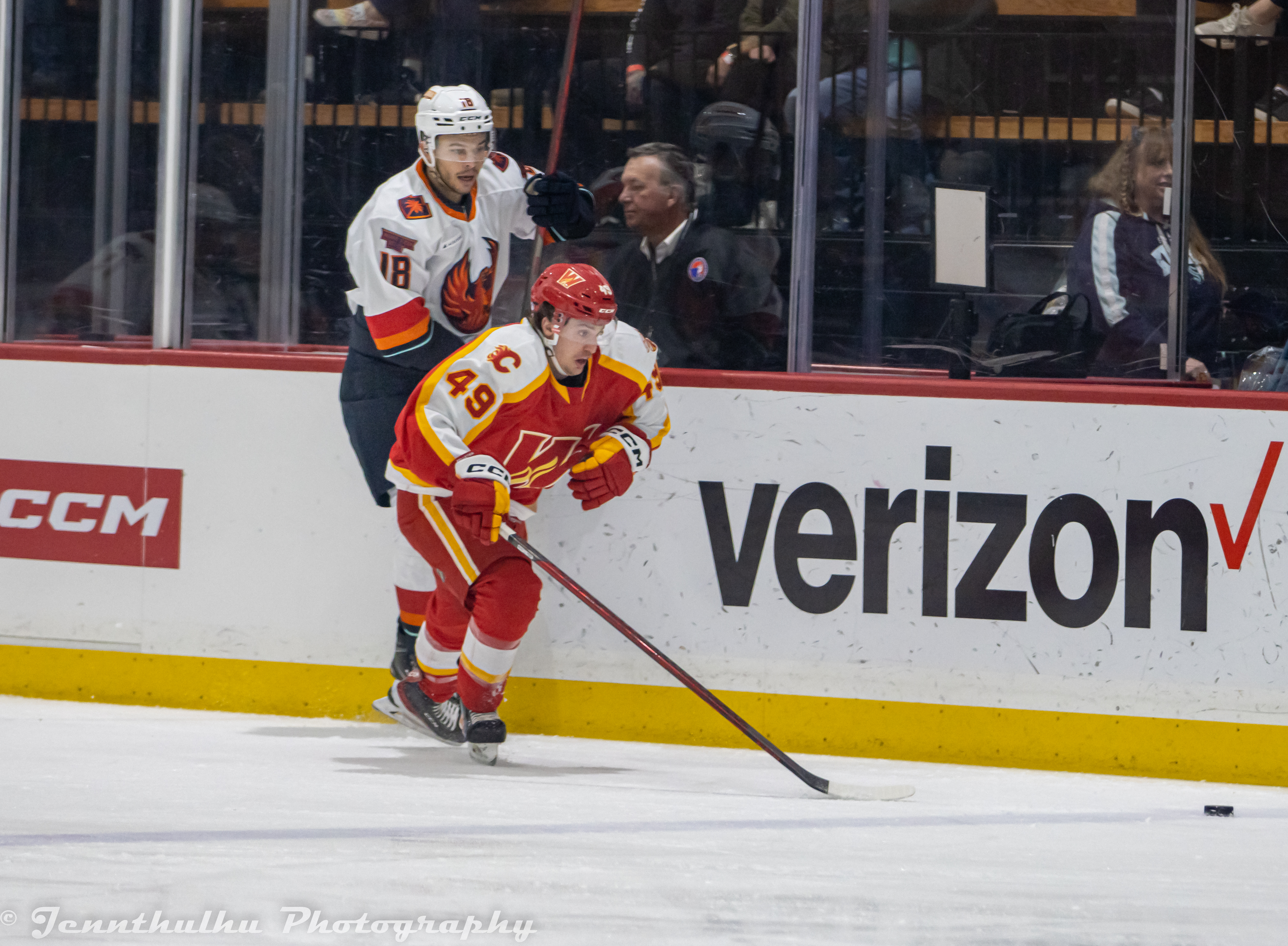

After playing one season with the Val-d'Or Foreurs, Pelletier began his professional career by joining the Stockton Heat in the American Hockey League for the 2021–22 season. After going pointless in his debut, Pelletier scored his first professional goal in the second game of the season. He also added three points over his next two games. Pelletier quickly earned a spot on the Heat's top line with Adam Ružička and Matthew Phillips. Pelletier consistent offensive output through October and November played an important role in the Heat maintaining a 11–2–2 record through the first 15 games of the season. Throughout those games, Pelletier accumulated 17 points and ranked fourth among all AHL rookies in scoring. He quickly became the third fastest rookie in the 2021–22 season to record 10 goals and was praised by general manager Brad Pascall for his ability to adapt to the professional level. Once Ružička was called up to the NHL, Pelletier and Phillips gained Glenn Gawdin as their top line centerman. On March 9, Pelletier recorded his first career AHL hat-trick in a 5–2 win over the San Diego Gulls. A few weeks later, Pelletier recorded five goals and two assists over four games to earn the AHL's Player of the Week honour for the period ending on March 20. His scoring prowess also helped the Heat clinch a berth in the 2022 Calder Cup playoffs. Pelletier finished the season leading all rookies with 27 goals and ranked second with 62 points. His points total set a new rookie scoring record which had previously been held by Mark Jankowski. As a result of his overall performance, Pelletier was named to the AHL's 2021–22 All-Rookie Team.

Due to the Heat's top record in the league, they earned a first-round bye for the 2022 Calder Cup playoffs. Pelletier made his Calder Cup playoffs debut with the Heat during Game 1 of their Pacific Division best-of-five semifinal series against the Bakersfield Condors. He scored his first postseason goal during that game to help the Heat win 3–1. Pelletier later scored a goal and an assist in Game 3 to lift the Heat to their first ever postseason series win. Following their win, Pelletier and the Heat met with the Chicago Wolves in the Western Conference Finals. Pelletier was held goalless in the series until Game 5 when he scored a goal early in the third period, which helped the Heat eventually win the game 3–2. He finished the postseason with four goals and three assists for seven points over 13 playoff games.

During the 2022 off-season, the Flames relocated their AHL affiliate to Calgary and renamed them the Calgary Wranglers. Pelletier participated in the Flames' 2022 Development Camp but was returned to the Wranglers before the start of the 2022–23 season. Upon joining the Wranglers, Pelletier was reunited with Phillips and his new teammate Radim Zohorna on the team's top line. Pelletier quickly resumed his scoring prowess and tallied five goals and 10 assists for 15 points over his first 14 games of the season. Through November, Pelletier maintained a 10 game point streak which resulted in seven goals and 10 assists over that span. By early January, Pelletier ranked second on the team in scoring with 15 goals and 19 assists through 31 games. As a result of his play, Pelletier was recalled to the NHL level on January 7. After serving as a healthy scratch for six games, he made his NHL debut on January 21 against the Tampa Bay Lightning. In his debut, he played just under seven minutes of ice time and recorded one shot on goal and one hit. While he was originally playing on the Flames' fourth line, Pelletier was promoted to the Flames' second line with Nazem Kadri and Jonathan Huberdeau for the final two games leading up to the NHL's All-Star break. During the NHL's short pause in play due to the 2023 NHL All-Star Game, Pelletier was reassigned to the Wranglers. Upon returning to the NHL line-up, Pelletier was again reunited with Kadri and Huberdeau. On February 11, Pelletier recorded his first career NHL goal against the Buffalo Sabres. He remained a consistent member of the Flames lineup before serving as a healthy scratch on March 17. At the time, he had accumulated three goals and seven points over 22 games. Pelletier continued to serve as a healthy scratch for the Flames occasionally as the 2022–23 season came to a close. He served as a healthy scratch for 10 consecutive games in late March and early April before returning to the lineup for the Flames' final game of the season. As the Flames had failed to qualify for the 2023 Stanley Cup playoffs, Pelletier was returned to the Wranglers for the remainder of their season.

Pelletier finished the AHL regular season with 16 goals and 21 assists in 35 regular-season games for the Wranglers. He scored the overtime game-winning goal in Game 1 of the 2023 Calder Cup playoffs to lead the team over the Abbotsford Canucks in the Pacific Division semifinals. Pelletier scored his second goal of the postseason in Game 1 of the Wrangler's Pacific Division Finals against the Coachella Valley Firebirds.

Upon returning to the Flames for their 2023 Development Camp, Pelletier changed his jersey number to 22. While participating in the Flames' 2023 preseason games, Pelletier suffered a shoulder injury during a game against the Seattle Kraken. As a result, he underwent shoulder surgery in October and was expected to be out long-term. Pelletier subsequently missed three months to recover before making his season debut with the Wranglers on January 26, 2024. He spent four games with the Wranglers on a conditioning stint where he tallied two goals and one assist. Pelletier was recalled to the NHL level following the 2023 NHL All-Star break and made his season debut on February 6, against the Boston Bruins. However, he re-injured his shoulder following a hit by Jacob Trouba of the New York Rangers on February 12.

=== Philadelphia Flyers ===
On January 30, 2025, Pelletier, along with Andrei Kuzmenko, and two draft picks, was traded to the Philadelphia Flyers in exchange for Joel Farabee and Morgan Frost. He was not tendered a qualifying offer following the season, making him an unrestricted free agent.

=== Tampa Bay Lightning ===
Pelletier signed a three-year contract with the Tampa Bay Lightning on July 2, 2025.While with the Syracuse Crunch of the American Hockey League, Pelletier set a franchise record with points in 19 consecutive games.

== Career statistics ==
Medal record

Representing Canada

Ice hockey

World Junior Championships
Silver medal – second place	2021 Canada	

=== Regular season and playoffs ===
			Regular season					Playoffs
Season	Team	League	GP	G	A	Pts	PIM	GP	G	A	Pts	PIM
2016–17	Séminaire St-François Blizzard	QMAAA	40	25	32	57	16	17	15	14	29	10
2017–18	Moncton Wildcats	QMJHL	60	23	38	61	20	10	2	3	5	6
2018–19	Moncton Wildcats	QMJHL	65	39	50	89	24	7	2	1	3	2
2019–20	Moncton Wildcats	QMJHL	57	32	50	82	16	—	—	—	—	—
2020–21	Val-d'Or Foreurs	QMJHL	28	13	30	43	20	15	5	18	23	6
2021–22	Stockton Heat	AHL	66	27	35	62	22	13	4	3	7	4
2022–23	Calgary Wranglers	AHL	35	16	21	37	24	9	4	6	10	4
2022–23	Calgary Flames	NHL	24	3	4	7	2	—	—	—	—	—
2023–24	Calgary Wranglers	AHL	18	5	7	12	10	6	1	2	3	2
2023–24	Calgary Flames	NHL	13	1	2	3	2	—	—	—	—	—
2024–25	Calgary Wranglers	AHL	20	3	16	19	4	—	—	—	—	—
2024–25	Calgary Flames	NHL	24	4	7	11	6	—	—	—	—	—
2024–25	Philadelphia Flyers	NHL	25	3	5	8	4	—	—	—	—	—
2025–26	Syracuse Crunch	AHL	63	28	49	77	19	4	1	4	5	4
2025–26	Tampa Bay Lightning	NHL	5	0	0	0	0	—	—	—	—	—
NHL totals			91	11	18	29	14	—	—	—	—	—

=== International ===
Year	Team	Event	Result	GP	G	A	Pts	PIM
2017	Canada White	U17	4th	6	4	0	4	4
2018	Canada	HG18	1st place, gold medalist(s)	4	1	1	2	0
2019	Canada	U18	4th	7	0	2	2	0
2021	Canada	WJC	2nd place, silver medalist(s)	7	3	4	7	2
Junior totals				24	8	7	15	6

== Awards and honors ==
Award	Year	Ref
QMAAA
First All-Star Team	2017	
Most Sportsmanlike Player	2017	
Playoffs MVP	2017	
QMJHL
All-Rookie Team	2018	
Frank J. Selke Memorial Trophy	2020	
Second All-Star Team	2020	
First All-Star Team	2021	
AHL
All-Rookie Team	2022	
John B. Sollenberger Trophy	2026	

Awards and achievements
Preceded by Juuso Välimäki	Calgary Flames first-round draft pick 2019	Succeeded by Connor Zary
