= 2019–20 QMJHL season =

- League: Quebec Major Junior Hockey League
- Sport: Hockey
- Duration: September 19, 2019 – March 17, 2020
- Teams: 18
- TV partner(s): Eastlink TV; TVA Sports; MATV

Draft
- Top draft pick: Joshua Roy
- Picked by: Saint John Sea Dogs

Regular season
- Jean Rougeau Trophy: Sherbrooke Phoenix (6)
- Season MVP: Alexis Lafrenière (Rimouski Océanic)
- Top scorer: Alexis Lafrenière (Rimouski Océanic)

Playoffs
- Finals champions: None

QMJHL seasons
- 2018–19 2020–21

2019–20 CHL seasons
- League: Canadian Hockey League
- Sport: Hockey
- Duration: OHL; September 2019 – March 2020; QMJHL; September 2019 – March 2020; WHL; September 2019 – March 2020
- Teams: 60
- TV partner(s): TVA Sports; Rogers Sportsnet; Rogers TV; Shaw TV
- Season MVP: Alexis Lafrenière (Rimouski Océanic) (QMJHL)
- Top scorer: Marco Rossi (Ottawa 67's) (OHL)

Memorial Cup
- Finals champions: None (cancelled)

The 2019–20 QMJHL season was the 51st season of the Quebec Major Junior Hockey League (QMJHL). The regular season began on September 19, 2019, and was scheduled to end on March 21, 2020. Due to the COVID-19 pandemic in Canada, the regular season was suspended on March 12, 2020, and cancelled five days later.

The post-season was scheduled to begin following the regular season, in which sixteen teams would compete for the President's Cup and be crowned champions of the QMJHL. Due to the COVID-19 pandemic in Canada, the playoffs were cancelled.

== Suspension and cancellation of regular season ==
On March 12, 2020, the league announced that the season has been suspended due to the COVID-19 pandemic in Canada. Five days later, on March 17, the league announced that the remainder of the regular season was cancelled. The final standings are based on points percentage.

== Cancellation of playoffs and Memorial Cup ==
On March 23, 2020, the league announced that the playoffs have been cancelled due to the COVID-19 pandemic in Canada. The Canadian Hockey League announced that the 2020 Memorial Cup held in Kelowna, British Columbia was cancelled.

== Final standings ==
Note: GP = Games played; W = Wins; L = Losses; OTL = Overtime losses; SL = Shootout losses; GF = Goals for; GA = Goals against; PTS = Points; x = clinched playoff berth; y = clinched division title; z = clinched Jean Rougeau Trophy

=== Eastern Conference ===
Maritimes Division	GP	W	L	OTL	SL	PTS	GF	GA	Rank
xy-Moncton Wildcats	64	50	13	1	0	101	276	148	1
x-Cape Breton Eagles	63	40	20	2	1	83	269	194	3
x-Charlottetown Islanders	64	33	26	5	0	71	197	205	5
x-Saint John Sea Dogs	64	30	33	1	0	61	226	280	6
Halifax Mooseheads	63	20	38	3	2	45	170	263	9
Acadie–Bathurst Titan	64	12	40	8	4	36	171	279	10

East Division	GP	W	L	OTL	SL	PTS	GF	GA	Rank
xy-Chicoutimi Saguenéens	63	45	12	5	1	96	256	182	2
x-Rimouski Océanic	64	38	18	4	4	84	252	176	4
x-Quebec Remparts	64	27	32	4	1	59	202	245	7
x-Baie-Comeau Drakkar	64	24	29	7	4	59	196	240	8

=== Western Conference ===
Central Division	GP	W	L	OTL	SL	PTS	GF	GA	Rank
xyz-Sherbrooke Phoenix	63	51	8	3	1	106	290	164	1
x-Drummondville Voltigeurs	63	36	25	2	0	74	232	221	3
x-Victoriaville Tigres	63	26	28	5	4	61	190	201	5
x-Shawinigan Cataractes	63	29	32	2	0	60	227	245	6

West Division	GP	W	L	OTL	SL	PTS	GF	GA	Rank
xy-Blainville-Boisbriand Armada	63	32	27	2	2	68	212	219	2
x-Rouyn-Noranda Huskies	63	29	30	2	2	62	180	209	4
x-Val-d'Or Foreurs	63	26	30	5	2	59	207	247	7
x-Gatineau Olympiques	64	22	37	5	0	49	204	247	8

== Scoring leaders ==
Note: GP = Games played; G = Goals; A = Assists; Pts = Points; PIM = Penalty minutes

Player	Team	GP	G	A	Pts	PIM
Alexis Lafrenière	Rimouski Océanic	52	35	77	112	50
Alexander Khovanov	Moncton Wildcats	51	32	67	99	94
Egor Sokolov	Cape Breton Eagles	52	46	46	92	42
Félix Robert	Sherbrooke Phoenix	46	36	56	92	47
Xavier Simoneau	Drummondville Voltigeurs	61	28	61	89	59
Alex-Olivier Voyer	Sherbrooke Phoenix	63	44	44	88	76
Cédric Paré	Rimouski Océanic	64	37	51	88	36
Jeremy McKenna	Moncton Wildcats	57	40	42	82	24
Raphaël Lavoie	Halifax/Chicoutimi	55	38	44	82	48
Jakob Pelletier	Moncton Wildcats	57	32	50	82	16

== Leading goaltenders ==
Note: GP = Games played; Mins = Minutes played; W = Wins; L = Losses: OTL = Overtime losses; SL = Shootout losses; GA = Goals Allowed; SO = Shutouts; GAA = Goals against average

Player	Team	GP	Mins	W	L	OTL	SOL	GA	SO	Sv%	GAA
Samuel Hlavaj	Sherbrooke Phoenix	39	2294:39	33	3	2	0	86	3	.915	2.25
Olivier Rodrigue	Moncton Wildcats	39	2353:06	31	7	1	0	91	6	.918	2.32
Kevin Mandolese	Cape Breton Eagles	37	2114:53	26	8	1	0	82	2	.925	2.33
Colten Ellis	Rimouski Océanic	29	1690:59	18	7	2	1	68	2	.904	2.41
Alexis Shank	Chicoutimi Saguenéens	50	2887:26	36	9	2	1	127	2	.910	2.64

== Trophies and awards ==
- President's Cup – Playoff Champions: Not Awarded
- Jean Rougeau Trophy – Regular Season Champions: Sherbrooke Phoenix
- Luc Robitaille Trophy – Team with the best goals for average: Sherbrooke Phoenix
- Robert Lebel Trophy – Team with best GAA: Moncton Wildcats

Player

- Michel Brière Memorial Trophy – Most Valuable Player: Alexis Lafrenière, Rimouski Océanic
- Jean Béliveau Trophy – Top Scorer: Alexis Lafrenière, Rimouski Océanic
- Guy Lafleur Trophy – Playoff MVP: Not Awarded
- Jacques Plante Memorial Trophy – Top Goaltender: Samuel Hlavaj, Sherbrooke Phoenix
- Guy Carbonneau Trophy – Best Defensive Forward: Benoit-Olivier Groulx, Halifax Mooseheads/Moncton Wildcats
- Emile Bouchard Trophy – Defenceman of the Year: Jordan Spence, Moncton Wildcats
- Kevin Lowe Trophy – Best Defensive Defenceman: Adam McCormick, Cape Breton Eagles
- Michael Bossy Trophy – Top Prospect: Alexis Lafrenière, Rimouski Océanic
- RDS Cup – Rookie of the Year: Zachary Bolduc, Rimouski Océanic
- Michel Bergeron Trophy – Offensive Rookie of the Year: Zachary Bolduc, Rimouski Océanic
- Raymond Lagacé Trophy – Defensive Rookie of the Year: Samuel Hlavaj, Sherbrooke Phoenix
- Frank J. Selke Memorial Trophy – Most sportsmanlike player: Jakob Pelletier, Moncton Wildcats
- QMJHL Humanitarian of the Year – Humanitarian of the Year: Xavier Simoneau, Drummondville Voltigeurs
- Marcel Robert Trophy – Best Scholastic Player: Rafaël Harvey-Pinard, Chicoutimi Saguenéens
- Paul Dumont Trophy – Personality of the Year: Alexis Lafrenière, Rimouski Océanic

Executive

- Ron Lapointe Trophy – Coach of the Year: Stéphane Julien, Sherbrooke Phoenix
- Maurice Filion Trophy – General Manager of the Year: Jocelyn Thibault, Sherbrooke Phoenix

=== All-Star teams ===
First All-Star Team:

- Kevin Mandolese, Goaltender, Cape Breton Eagles
- Jordan Spence, Defenceman, Moncton Wildcats
- Justin Bergeron, Defenceman, Rimouski Océanic
- Alexis Lafrenière, Forward, Rimouski Océanic
- Egor Sokolov, Forward, Cape Breton Eagles
- Alexander Khovanov, Forward, Moncton Wildcats

Second All-Star Team:

- Samuel Hlavaj, Goaltender, Sherbrooke Phoenix
- William Villeneuve, Defenceman, Saint John Sea Dogs
- Adam McCormick, Defenceman, Cape Breton Eagles
- Félix Robert, Forward, Sherbrooke Phoenix
- Alex-Olivier Voyer, Forward, Sherbrooke Phoenix
- Jakob Pelletier, Forward, Moncton Wildcats

All-Rookie Team:

- Samuel Hlavaj, Goaltender, Sherbrooke Phoenix
- Isaac Belliveau, Defenceman, Rimouski Océanic
- Jacob Dion, Defenceman, Drummondville Voltigeurs
- Zachary Bolduc, Forward, Rimouski Océanic
- Zachary Dean, Forward, Gatineau Olympiques
- Zachary L'Heureux, Forward, Moncton Wildcats

== See also ==
- List of QMJHL seasons
- 2019 in ice hockey
- 2020 in ice hockey
- 2019–20 OHL season
- 2019–20 WHL season
- 2020 Memorial Cup

Preceded by 2018–19 QMJHL season	QMJHL seasons	Succeeded by 2020–21 QMJHL season
