= Jérémie Poirier =

Canadian ice hockey player (born 2002)

- Poirier with the Adler Mannheim in 2026
- Born: June 2, 2002 (age 24) Valleyfield, Quebec, Canada
- Height: 6 ft 1 in (185 cm)
- Weight: 196 lb (89 kg; 14 st 0 lb)
- Position: Defence
- Shoots: Left
- DEL team Former teams: Adler Mannheim; Calgary Wranglers; Texas Stars
- NHL draft: 72nd overall, 2020; Calgary Flames
- Playing career: 2022–present

Jérémie Poirier (born June 2, 2002) is a Canadian professional ice hockey player who is a defenceman for Adler Mannheim of the Deutsche Eishockey Liga (DEL).

== Playing career ==
=== Junior ===
Poirier was drafted in the first round, 8th overall by the Saint John Sea Dogs in the 2018 QMJHL entry draft. Poirier played four seasons with the Sea Dogs, including their road to, and eventual championship of the 2022 Memorial Cup along with fellow Calgary Flames defensive prospect Yan Kuznetsov. A consistent point producer during his tenure with the Sea Dogs, Poirier holds several franchise records for scoring. These records include most career goals and points for a defenceman, as well as most single season goals by a defenceman. During the 2019–20 QMJHL season Poirier scored 20 goals, leading all defencemen in the league.

=== Professional ===
Despite being projected as a late first round pick, Poirier was drafted in the third round, 72nd overall by the Calgary Flames in the 2020 NHL entry draft, signing his entry-level deal with the Flames on September 24, 2021. Poirier made his professional debut with the Calgary Wranglers of the AHL on October 16, 2022, scoring the first goal in Wranglers history during their inaugural game, a 6–5 loss against the Coachella Valley Firebirds. Poirier was able to transition his scoring prowess to the AHL, finishing second among rookie defencemen for scoring as well as having the best shootout record in the league, scoring on all four of his attempts. During his rookie season, Poirier struggled at times with balancing his offensive abilities with his defensive responsibilities, and did not play for several games due to this. On April 12, 2023, Poirier was named to the 2022-23 AHL All-Rookie Team.

On February 2, 2026, Poirier was traded to the Dallas Stars in exchange for Gavin White. Assigned to the AHL , Poirier played out the remainder of the season with the Texas Stars, regaining his scoring touch in posting 10 points through 16 games.

As a free agent, Poirier opted to sign a one-year contract abroad, agreeing to terms with German club, Adler Mannheim of the DEL, on July 8, 2026.

== Playing style ==
Poirier is regarded as having high potential as an offensive defenceman, but has been criticized for making defensive lapses.

== Career statistics ==
=== Regular season and playoffs ===
			Regular season					Playoffs
Season	Team	League	GP	G	A	Pts	PIM	GP	G	A	Pts	PIM
2016–17	Châteauguay Grenadiers	QMAAA	38	4	9	13	26	9	1	1	2	6
2017–18	Châteauguay Grenadiers	QMAAA	40	5	26	31	22	13	1	5	6	10
2018–19	Saint John Sea Dogs	QMJHL	61	6	15	21	45	—	—	—	—	—
2019–20	Saint John Sea Dogs	QMJHL	64	20	33	53	50	—	—	—	—	—
2020–21	Saint John Sea Dogs	QMJHL	33	9	28	37	30	6	4	5	9	10
2021–22	Saint John Sea Dogs	QMJHL	67	16	41	57	38	5	0	3	3	4
2022–23	Calgary Wranglers	AHL	69	9	32	41	52	9	2	6	8	10
2023–24	Calgary Wranglers	AHL	23	3	10	13	22	6	1	3	4	2
2024–25	Calgary Wranglers	AHL	71	5	37	42	64	2	0	0	0	0
2025–26	Calgary Wranglers	AHL	35	1	5	6	24	—	—	—	—	—
2025–26	Texas Stars	AHL	16	4	6	10	9	—	—	—	—	—
AHL totals			214	22	90	112	171	17	3	9	12	12

=== International ===
Year	Team	Event	Result	GP	G	A	Pts	PIM
2018	Canada White	U17	6th	5	3	3	6	0
2019	Canada	HG18	2nd place, silver medalist(s)	5	1	2	3	2
Junior totals				10	4	5	9	2

== Awards and honours ==
Award	Year	Ref
AHL
AHL All-Rookie Team	2023	
