= 2022 Memorial Cup =

Canadian junior men's ice hockey championship

Tournament details
- Venue(s): TD Station; Saint John, New Brunswick
- Dates: June 20–29, 2022
- Teams: 4
- Host team: Saint John Sea Dogs (QMJHL)
- TV partner(s): TSN, RDS

Final positions
- Champions: Saint John Sea Dogs (QMJHL) (2nd title)
- Runners-up: Hamilton Bulldogs (OHL)

Tournament statistics
- Games played: 8
- Attendance: 41,084 (5,136 per game)
- Scoring leader: William Dufour (Sea Dogs) (8 points)

Awards
- MVP: William Dufour (Sea Dogs)

The 2022 Memorial Cup (branded as the 2022 Memorial Cup presented by Kia for sponsorship reasons) was a four-team round-robin format ice hockey tournament held at TD Station in Saint John, New Brunswick from June 20–29, 2022. It was the 102nd Memorial Cup championship which determines the champion of the Canadian Hockey League (CHL). The tournament was hosted by the Saint John Sea Dogs, who won the right to host the tournament over the Quebec Remparts. The Saint John Sea Dogs defeated the Hamilton Bulldogs to win their second Memorial Cup. The Memorial Cup returned after two years of absence due to the coronavirus pandemic.

== Host bidding process ==
The Memorial Cup trophy

The Quebec Major Junior Hockey League (QMJHL) considered bids from the Quebec Remparts and Saint John Sea Dogs.

== Rule changes ==
The Canadian Hockey League made changes to the Memorial Cup rules as of 2022:

- A new point system for the round-robin games: three points for a regulation win, two points for an overtime win, and one point for an overtime loss.
- Overtime in the round-robin played in a 3-on-3 format in 20-minute periods until a winner is decided. The intermissions between the third period and overtime and each additional overtime period is 15 minutes.
- Television timeouts eliminated during overtime. The ice surface to be cleaned in front of the goal nets and player benches at the first stoppage after the 10-minute mark of an overtime period.

== Road to the Cup ==
=== OHL playoffs ===
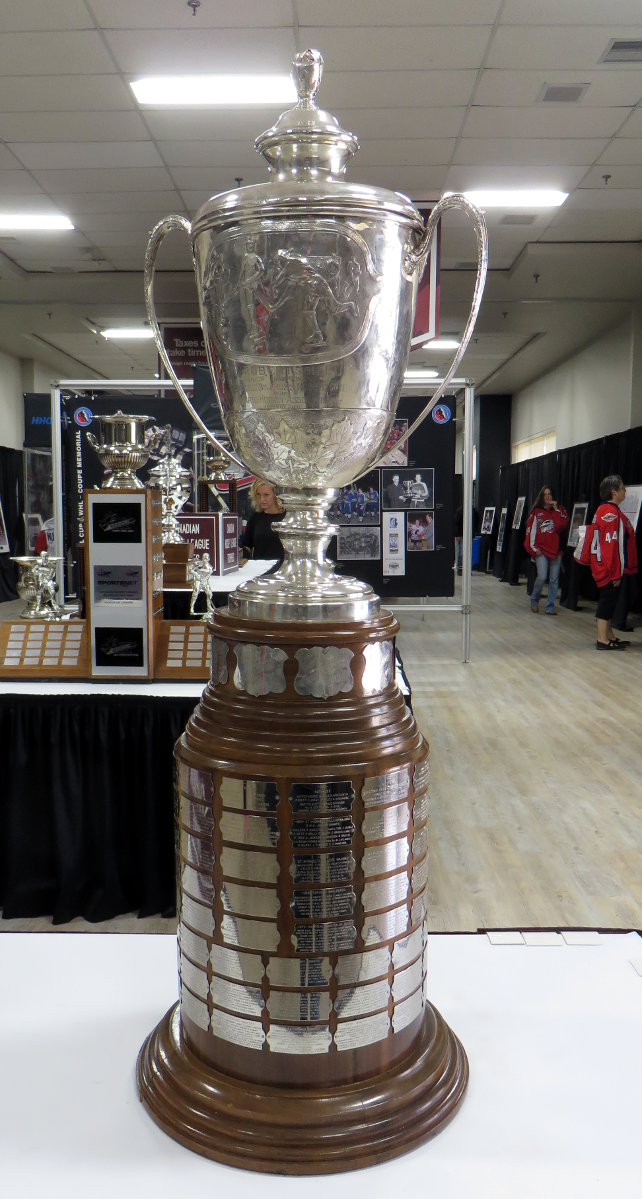
The J. Ross Robertson Cup, championship trophy of the OHL

Conference quarterfinals	Conference semifinals
E1	Hamilton	4
E8	Peterborough	0
E1	Hamilton	4
E4	Mississauga	0
E4	Mississauga	4
E5	Barrie	2
Eastern Conference
E3	Kingston	4
E6	Oshawa	2
E2	North Bay	4
E3	Kingston	1
E2	North Bay	4
E7	Ottawa	0
Note: Pairings are re-seeded after the first round.
W1	Windsor	4
W8	Sarnia	2
W1	Windsor	4
W7	Kitchener	1
W4	Sault Ste. Marie	4
W5	Guelph	1
Western Conference
W3	Flint	4
W6	Owen Sound	3
W3	Flint	4
W4	Sault Ste. Marie	1
W2	London	3
W7	Kitchener	4

Conference finals
E1	Hamilton	4
E2	North Bay	0
W1	Windsor	4
W3	Flint	3

Finals
E1	Hamilton	4
W1	Windsor	3

=== QMJHL playoffs ===
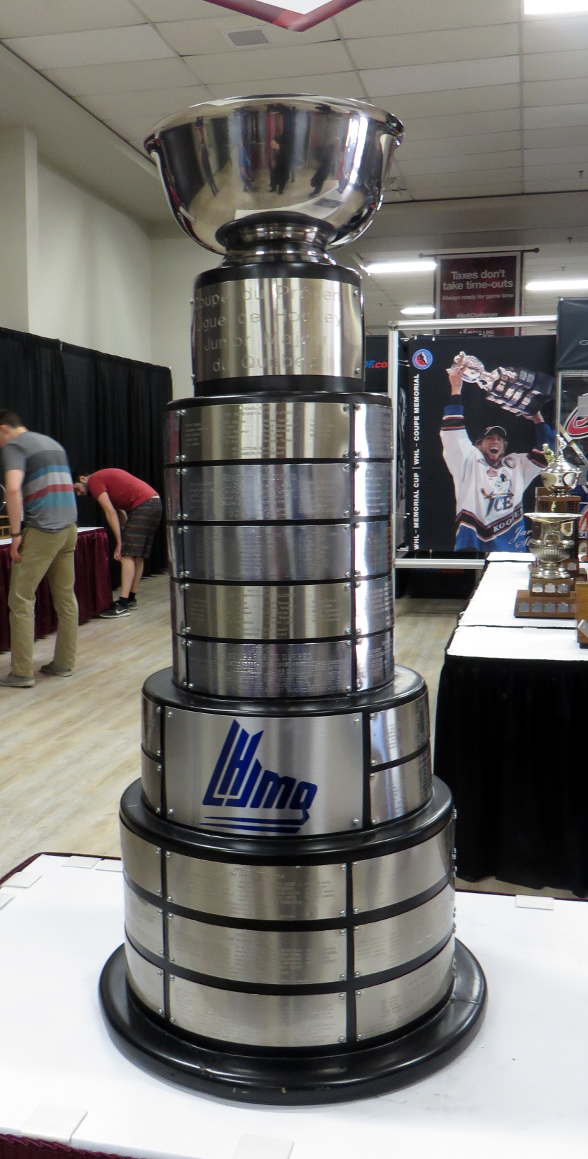
The President's Cup, championship trophy of the QMJHL

Note: In the first two rounds seeding is determined by conference standings, and in the two final rounds seeding is determined by overall standings.

Conference quarter-finals
W1	Sherbrooke	3
W8	Baie-Comeau	1
W2	Gatineau	3
W7	Val-d'Or	1
W3	Shawinigan	3
W6	Rouyn-Noranda	0
W4	Drummondville	1
W5	Blainville-Boisbriand	3
E1	Quebec	3
E8	Chicoutimi	0
E2	Charlottetown	3
E7	Moncton	0
E3	Saint John	2
E6	Rimouski	3
E4	Acadie–Bathurst	3
E5	Halifax	2

Conference semi-finals
W1	Sherbrooke	3
W5	Blainville-Boisbriand	0
W2	Gatineau	0
W3	Shawinigan	3
E1	Quebec	3
E6	Rimouski	1
E2	Charlottetown	3
E4	Acadie–Bathurst	0

Semi-finals
1	Quebec	2
7	Shawinigan	3
2	Charlottetown	3
4	Sherbrooke	1

President's Cup Championship
2	Charlottetown	1
7	Shawinigan	4

=== WHL playoffs ===
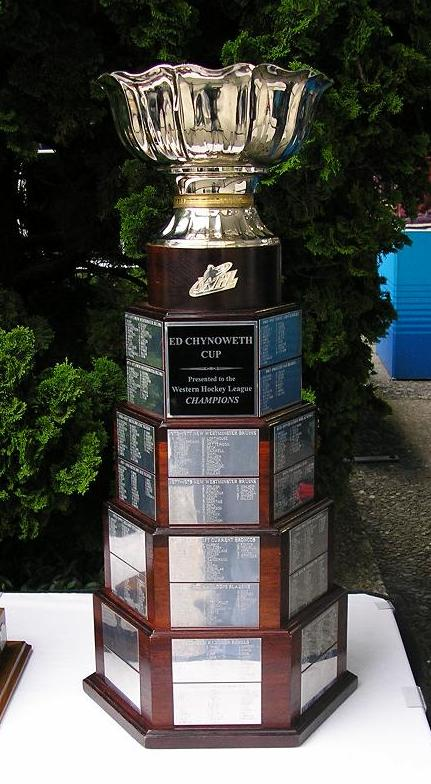
The Ed Chynoweth Cup, championship trophy of the WHL

Conference quarterfinals	Conference semifinals
E1	Winnipeg	4
E8	Prince Albert	1
E1	Winnipeg	4
E4	Moose Jaw	1
E4	Moose Jaw	4
E5	Saskatoon	1
Eastern
E3	Red Deer	4
E6	Brandon	2
E2	Edmonton	4
E3	Red Deer	0
E2	Edmonton	4
E7	Lethbridge	0
Note: Pairings are re-seeded after the first round.
W1	Everett	2
W8	Vancouver	4
W2	Kamloops	4
W8	Vancouver	2
W4	Seattle	4
W5	Kelowna	1
Western
W3	Portland	4
W6	Prince George	0
W3	Portland	3
W4	Seattle	4
W2	Kamloops	4
W7	Spokane	0

Conference finals
E1	Winnipeg	1
E2	Edmonton	4
W2	Kamloops	3
W4	Seattle	4

Finals
E2	Edmonton	4
W4	Seattle	2

== Team rosters ==
=== Saint John Sea Dogs ===
- Head coach: Gardiner MacDougall (interim)

Pos.	No.	Player
G	1	Thomas Couture
G	29	Noah Patenaude
G	70	Nikolas Hurtubise
D	2	Yan Kuznetsov
D	13	William Villeneuve
D	22	Vincent Despont
D	25	Nathan Drapeau
D	46	Vincent Sévigny
D	54	Jérémie Poirier
D	58	Charlie DesRoches
F	7	Peter Reynolds
F	10	Riley Bezeau
F	12	Brady Burns
F	14	Ryan Francis
F	18	Josh Lawrence
F	19	Philippe Daoust
F	21	Nicholas Blagden
F	27	Connor Trenholm
F	28	William Dufour
F	55	Raivis Ansons
F	61	Cam MacDonald
F	63	Marshall Lessard
F	67	Jacob Chantler
F	72	Olivier Picard

=== Shawinigan Cataractes ===
- Head coach: Daniel Renaud

Pos.	No.	Player
G	30	Antoine Coulombe
G	31	Charles-Antoine Lavallée
D	6	Sam McKinney
D	8	Isaac Ménard
D	15	Loris Rafanomezantsoa
D	24	Angus Booth
D	49	Jordan Tourigny
D	77	Martin Has
D	89	Zachary Massicotte
F	5	Lou-Félix Denis
F	20	Olivier Nadeau
F	22	Mavrik Bourque
F	25	Charles-Olivier Villeneuve
F	28	Jacob Lafontaine
F	29	Maximilien Ledoux
F	48	William Veillette
F	61	Alexis Bonefon
F	67	Daniel Agostino
F	78	Natan Éthier
F	79	Charles Beaudoin
F	92	Pierrick Dubé
F	93	Lorenzo Canonica
F	98	Xavier Bourgault

=== Edmonton Oil Kings ===
- Head coach: Brad Lauer

Pos.	No.	Player
G	30	Kolby Hay
G	33	Sebastian Cossa
G	35	Alex Worthington
D	2	Carter Kowalyk
D	4	Kaiden Guhle
D	5	Simon Kubicek
D	6	Luke Prokop
D	7	Ethan Peters
D	8	Braeden Wynne
D	9	Carson Golder
D	24	Logan Dowhniuk
D	28	Graydon Gotaas
F	11	Dylan Guenther
F	12	John Szabo
F	14	Josh Williams
F	15	Cole Miller
F	17	Gavin Hodnett
F	20	Dawson Seitz
F	21	Jake Neighbours
F	23	Jalen Luypen
F	25	Brendan Kuny
F	39	Shea Van Olm
F	41	Tyler Horstmann
F	42	Justin Sourdif
F	43	Jaxsen Wiebe
F	44	Carter Souch
F	77	Jakub Demek

=== Hamilton Bulldogs ===
- Head coach: Jay McKee

Pos.	No.	Player
G	33	Marco Costantini
G	45	Matteo Drobac
D	2	Artem Grushnikov
D	3	Noah Van Vliet
D	4	Lucas Moore
D	7	Noah Roberts
D	8	Arber Xhekaj
D	10	Gavin White
D	21	Colton Kammerer
D	44	Nathan Staios
D	75	Jorian Donovan
F	6	Noah Nelson
F	9	Logan Morrison
F	13	Avery Hayes
F	14	George Diaco
F	17	Giordano Biondi
F	19	Jan Mysak
F	20	Ethan Sims
F	22	Ryan Humphrey
F	23	Mason McTavish
F	25	Brenden Anderson
F	27	Ryan Winterton
F	39	Lawson Sherk
F	81	Braeden O'Keefe
F	88	Mark Duarte
F	92	Cole Brown
F	93	Patrick Thomas

== Tournament games ==
All times local (UTC −3)

=== Round-robin ===
June 20	Saint John Sea Dogs	5–3	Hamilton Bulldogs	TD Station	Recap
Yan Kuznetsov (1) – 2:17; Ryan Francis (1) – 16:31		First period	8:43 – pp – Ryan Winterton (1)
William Dufour (1) – 10:50; Ryan Francis (2) – 18:33		Second period	No scoring
Peter Reynolds (1) – en – 18:48		Third period	10:06 – pp – Avery Hayes (1); 16:41 – Ryan Winterton (2)
Nikolas Hurtubise (17 saves / 20 shots)		Goalie stats	Marco Costantini (30 saves / 34 shots)

June 21	Edmonton Oil Kings	3–4	Shawinigan Cataractes	TD Station	Recap
Luke Prokop (1) – 19:16		First period	10:11 – pp – Jordan Tourigny (1)
Tyler Horstmann (1) – 4:11; Cole Miller (1) – 17:03		Second period	7:11 – Xavier Bourgault (1)
No scoring		Third period	5:37 – Pierrick Dubé (1); 6:55 – Olivier Nadeau (1)
Sebastian Cossa (31 saves / 35 shots)		Goalie stats	Charles-Antoine Lavalée (25 saves / 28 shots)

June 22	Edmonton Oil Kings	4–3	OT	Saint John Sea Dogs	TD Station	Recap
Jaxsen Wiebe (1) – 2:14; Carter Stoch (1) – 4:27		First period		6:01 – Raivis Kristians Ansons (1); 6:27 – Josh Lawrence (1); 10:00 – William Dufour (1)
Jaxsen Wiebe (2) – 2:05		Second period		No scoring
No scoring		Third period		No scoring
Jaxsen Wiebe (3) – 8:05		First overtime period		No scoring
Sebastian Cossa (36 saves / 39 shots)		Goalie stats		Nikolas Hurtubise (27 saves / 31 shots)

June 23	Hamilton Bulldogs	2–3	Shawinigan Cataractes	TD Station	Recap
Mason McTavish (1) – pp – 5:08		First period	6:47 – pp – Xavier Bourgault (2); 11:42 – pp – Mavrik Bourque (1)
Avery Hayes (2) – 17:28		Second period	No scoring
No scoring		Third period	7:06 – pp – Olivier Nadeau (2)
Marco Costantini (31 saves / 34 shots)		Goalie stats	Antoine Coulombe (38 saves / 40 shots)

June 24	Hamilton Bulldogs	4–2	Edmonton Oil Kings	TD Station	Recap
Avery Hayes (3) – pp – 9:09; Ryan Winterton (3) – pp – 16:47		First period	No scoring
No scoring		Second period	No scoring
Mason McTavish (2) – 13:26; Mason McTavish (3) – en – 19:59		Third period	2:03 – sh – Jalen Luypen (1); 17:14 – Jake Neighbours (1)
Marco Costantini (40 saves / 42 shots)		Goalie stats	Sebastian Cossa (32 saves / 35 shots)

June 25	Shawinigan Cataractes	3–5	Saint John Sea Dogs	TD Station	Recap
Loris Rafanomezantsoa (1) – 0:49; Olivier Nadeau (3) – 14:33; William Veillette (1) – 19:17		First period	No scoring
No scoring		Second period	2:02 – William Dufour (3); 2:23 – William Dufour (4); 8:38 – William Dufour (5); 14:12 – pp – Jérémie Poirier (1)
No scoring		Third period	1:57 – William Dufour (6)
Antoine Coulombe (31 saves / 36 shots)		Goalie stats	Nikolas Hurtubise (26 saves / 29 shots)

Round-robin standings

Pos	Team	Pld	W	OTW	OTL	L	GF	GA	Pts	
1	Saint John Sea Dogs (QMJHL/host)	3	2	0	1	0	13	10	7	Advanced directly to the championship game
2	Shawinigan Cataractes (QMJHL)	3	2	0	0	1	10	10	6	Advanced to the semifinal game
3	Hamilton Bulldogs (OHL)	3	1	0	0	2	9	10	3	Advanced to the semifinal game
4	Edmonton Oil Kings (WHL)	3	0	1	0	2	9	11	2	

Updated to match(es) played on June 25, 2022. Source: chlmemorialcup.ca/standings

=== Semifinal game ===
June 27	Shawinigan Cataractes	3–4	OT	Hamilton Bulldogs	TD Station	Recap
Mavrik Bourque (2) – 14:39		First period		16:29 – Artem Grushnikov (1)
Olivier Nadeau (4) – 5:49		Second period		1:23 – Mason McTavish (4)
William Veillette (2) – 10:01		Third period		13:56 – Logan Morrison (1)
No scoring		First overtime period		10:08 – Jan Mysak (1)
Antoine Coulombe (39 saves / 43 shots)		Goalie stats		Marco Costantini (33 saves / 36 shots)

=== Championship game ===
June 29	Saint John Sea Dogs	6–3	Hamilton Bulldogs	TD Station	Recap
Vincent Sevigny (1) – 2:35; Cam MacDonald (1) – 5:47		First period	7:45 – Mason McTavish (5)
Riley Bezeau (1) – 4:41; William Dufour (7) – 5:15		Second period	19:51 – Jan Mysak (2)
Josh Lawrence (2) – pp – 6:32; Peter Reynolds (2) – en – 18:43		Third period	15:03 – Mason McTavish (6)
Nikolas Hurtubise (25 saves / 28 shots)		Goalie stats	Marco Costantini (21 saves / 26 shots)

== Statistical leaders ==
=== Skaters ===
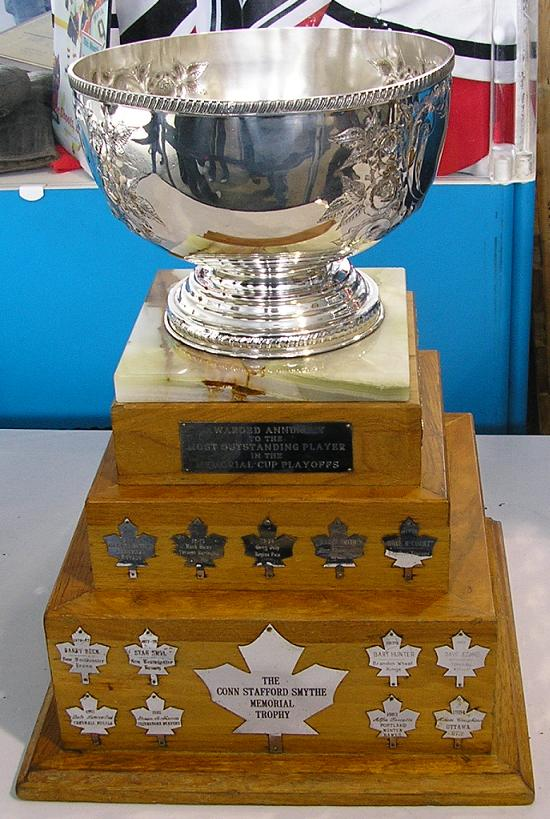
The Stafford Smythe Memorial Trophy, awarded to the most outstanding player in the Memorial Cup playoffs

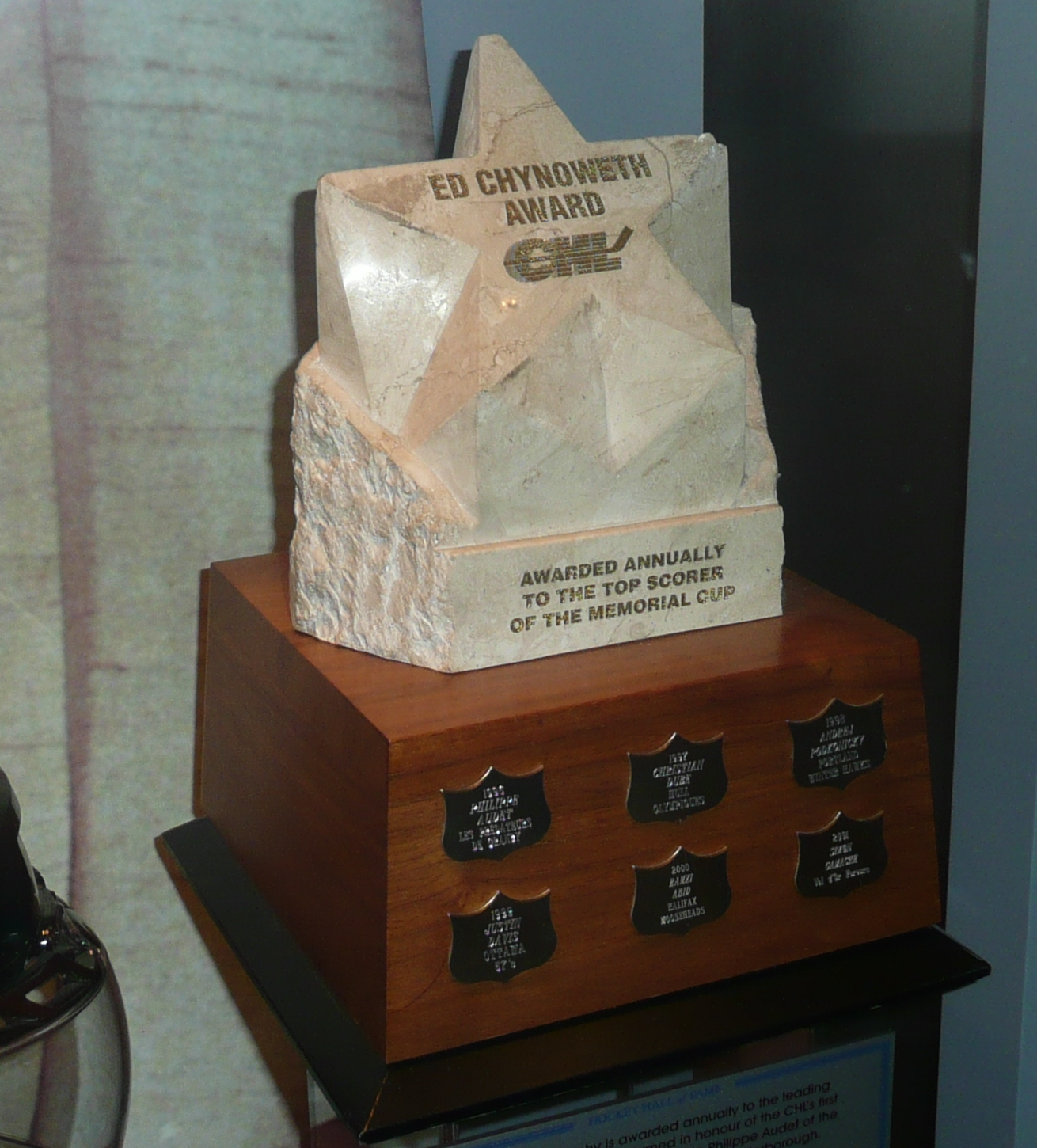
The Ed Chynoweth Trophy, awarded to the top scorer in the Memorial Cup tournament

- GP = Games played; G = Goals; A = Assists; Pts = Points; PIM = Penalty minutes

Player	Team	GP	G	A	Pts	PIM
William Dufour	Saint John Sea Dogs	4	7	1	8	4
Mason McTavish	Hamilton Bulldogs	5	6	2	8	2
Logan Morrison	Hamilton Bulldogs	5	1	7	8	4
Xavier Bourgault	Shawinigan Cataractes	4	2	5	7	2
Mavrik Bourque	Shawinigan Cataractes	4	2	5	7	8
Olivier Nadeau	Shawinigan Cataractes	4	4	2	6	2
Ryan Winterton	Hamilton Bulldogs	5	3	3	6	0
Ryan Francis	Saint John Sea Dogs	4	2	4	6	6
Josh Lawrence	Saint John Sea Dogs	4	2	4	6	0
Philippe Daoust	Saint John Sea Dogs	4	0	6	6	4

=== Goaltenders ===
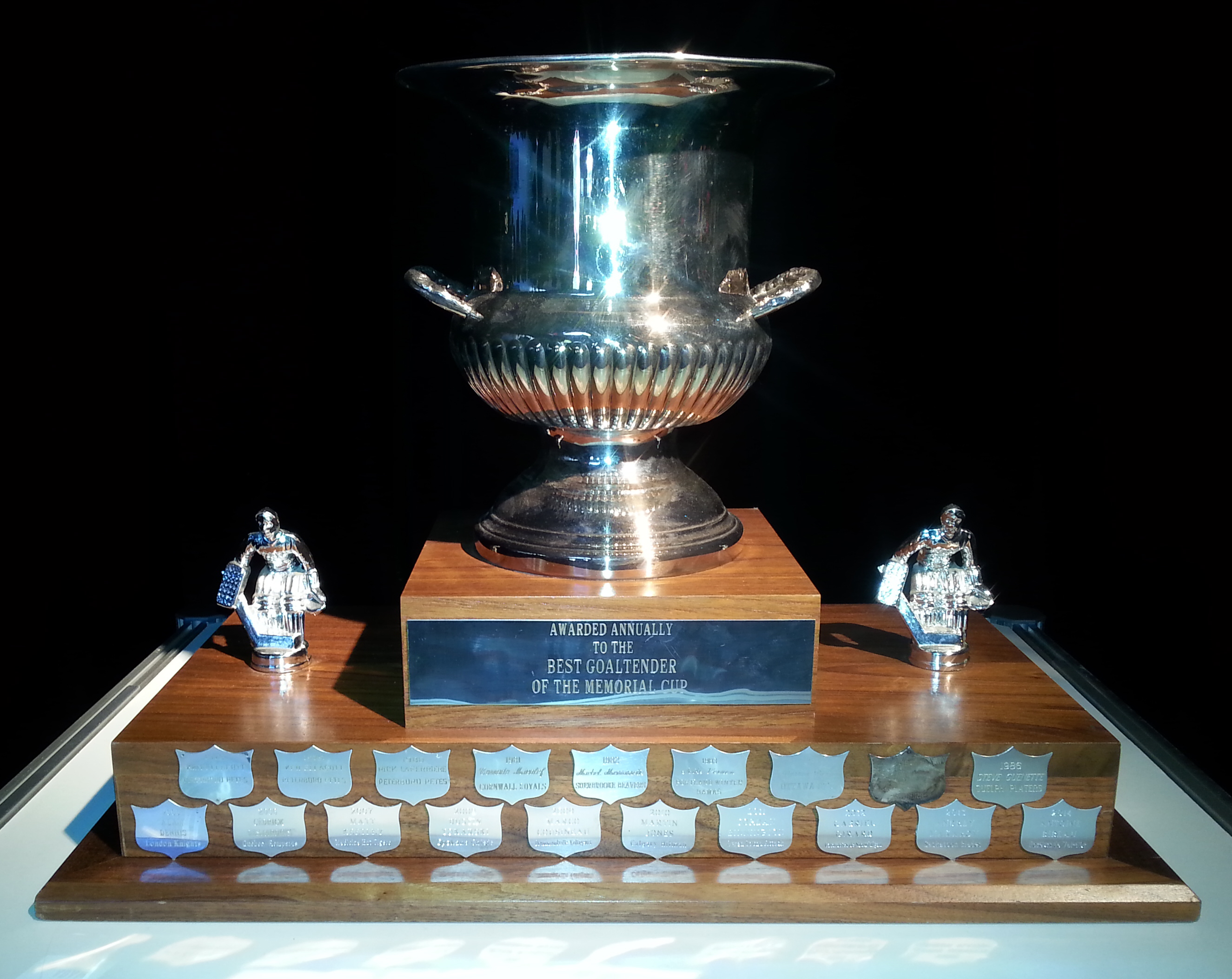
Hap Emms Memorial Trophy, awarded to the best goaltender in the Memorial Cup tournament

- GP = Games played; W = Wins; L = Losses; SA = Shots against; GA = Goals against; GAA = Goals against average; SV% = Save percentage; SO = Shutouts; TOI = Time on ice (minutes)

Player	Team	GP	W	L	OTL	SA	GA	GAA	SV%	SO	TOI
Charles-Antoine Lavallée	Shawinigan Cataractes	1	1	0	0	28	3	3.00	.893	0	60
Nikolas Hurtubise	Saint John Sea Dogs	4	3	0	1	108	13	3.14	.880	0	248
Sebastian Cossa	Edmonton Oil Kings	3	1	2	0	109	10	3.25	.908	0	184
Marco Costantini	Hamilton Bulldogs	5	2	3	0	172	17	3.34	.901	0	305
Antoine Coulombe	Shawinigan Cataractes	3	1	1	1	119	11	3.52	.908	0	187

== Awards ==
The CHL handed out the following awards at the conclusion of the 2022 Memorial Cup:

- Stafford Smythe Memorial Trophy (Most outstanding player): William Dufour, Saint John Sea Dogs
- Ed Chynoweth Trophy (Top scorer): William Dufour, Saint John Sea Dogs
- George Parsons Trophy (Most sportsmanlike player): Logan Morrison, Hamilton Bulldogs
- Hap Emms Memorial Trophy (Best goaltender): Nikolas Hurtubise, Saint John Sea Dogs
- Memorial Cup All-Star Team:

Goaltender: Nikolas Hurtubise, Saint John Sea Dogs
Defence: Yan Kuznetsov, Saint John Sea Dogs; Arber Xhekaj, Hamilton Bulldogs
Forwards: Mavrik Bourque, Shawinigan Cataractes; William Dufour, Saint John Sea Dogs; Mason McTavish, Hamilton Bulldogs
