= Guy Carbonneau Trophy =

The Guy Carbonneau Trophy (Trophée Guy Carbonneau) is awarded annually to the player in the Quebec Maritimes Junior Hockey League (QMJHL) judged to be the best defensive forward. The winner is determined by the number of face-offs won, plus-minus differential, the player's role within the team, and the number of scoring opportunities. The award is named after Guy Carbonneau, who won three Selke Trophies (1988, 1989, 1992) for best defensive forward in his distinguished National Hockey League (NHL) career. He played for the Chicoutimi Saguenéens as a junior.

== Winners ==
Season	Player	Team
2004–05	Simon Courcelles	Quebec Remparts
2005–06	David Brine	Halifax Mooseheads
2006–07	Marc-André Cliche	Lewiston MAINEiacs
2007–08	Olivier Fortier	Rimouski Océanic
2008–09	Jean-Philip Chabot	Gatineau Olympiques
2009–10	Gabriel Dumont	Drummondville Voltigeurs
2010–11	Phillip Danault	Victoriaville Tigres
2011–12	Frédérick Roy	Quebec Remparts
2012–13	Félix Girard	Baie-Comeau Drakkar
2013–14	Félix Girard	Baie-Comeau Drakkar
2014–15	Frédérik Gauthier	Rimouski Océanic
2015–16	Shawn Ouellette-St-Amant	Val-d'Or Foreurs
2016–17	Nicolas Roy	Chicoutimi Saguenéens
2017–18	Samuel Dove-McFalls	Rimouski Océanic
2018–19	Félix Lauzon	Drummondville Voltigeurs
2019–20	Benoit-Olivier Groulx	Halifax Mooseheads/Moncton Wildcats
2020–21	Dawson Mercer	Chicoutimi Saguenéens
2021–22	Jacob Gaucher	Baie-Comeau Drakkar
2022–23	Nathan Gaucher	Quebec Remparts
2023–24	Félix Gagnon	Baie-Comeau Drakkar
2024–25	Matyas Melovsky	Baie-Comeau Drakkar
2025–26	Gabe Smith	Moncton Wildcats
