= Xavier Bourgault =

Canadian ice hockey player (born 2002)

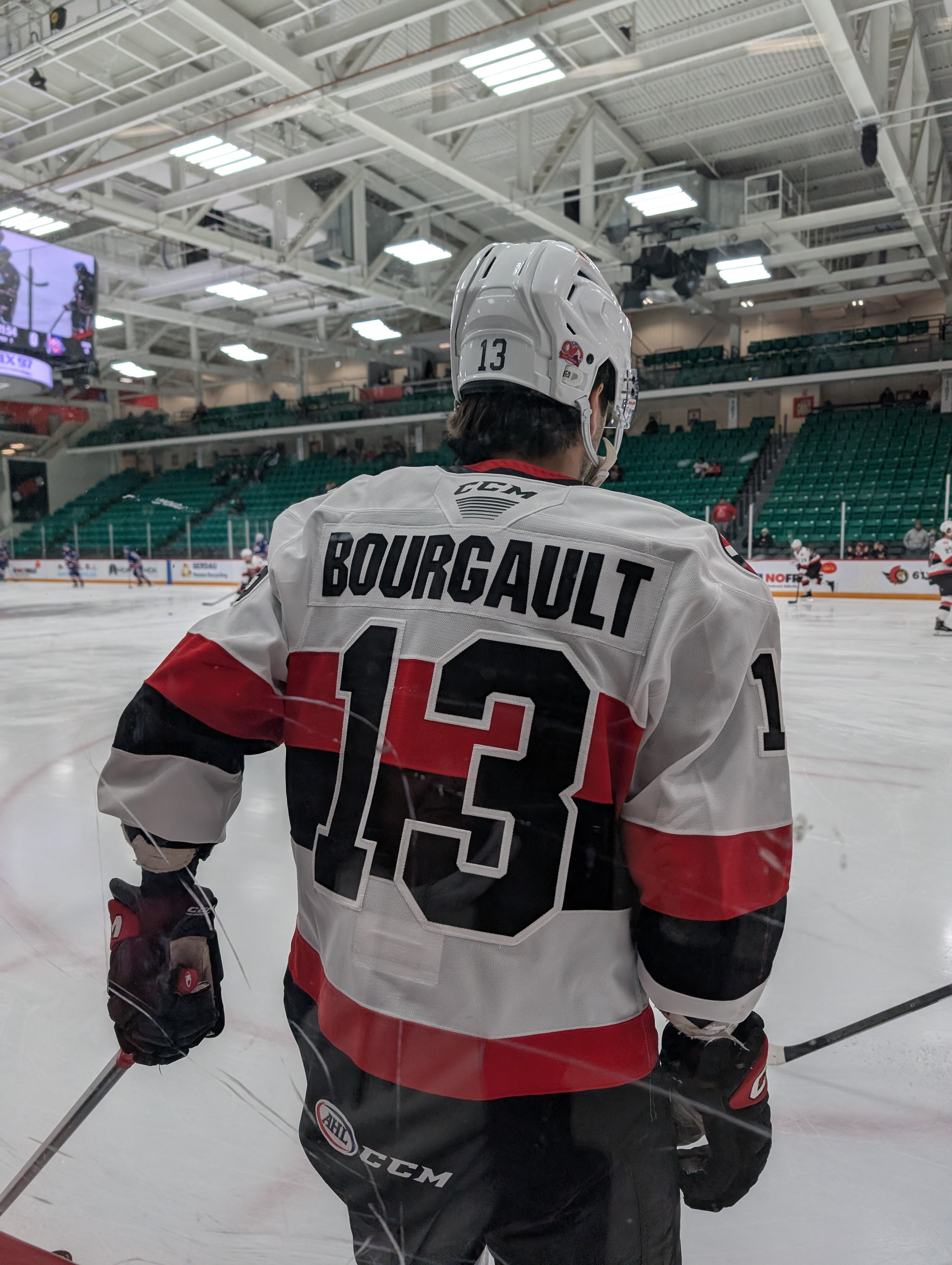
- Bourgault with the Belleville Senators in 2025
- Born: October 22, 2002 (age 23) L'Islet, Quebec, Canada
- Height: 5 ft 11 in (180 cm)
- Weight: 185 lb (84 kg; 13 st 3 lb)
- Position: Forward
- Shoots: Right
- NHL team (P) Cur. team: Ottawa Senators; Belleville Senators (AHL)
- NHL draft: 22nd overall, 2021; Edmonton Oilers
- Playing career: 2022–present

Xavier Bourgault (born October 22, 2002) is a Canadian professional ice hockey player who is a forward for the Belleville Senators of the American Hockey League (AHL) while under contract to the Ottawa Senators of the National Hockey League (NHL). He was drafted 22nd overall by the Edmonton Oilers in the 2021 NHL entry draft.

== Playing career ==
=== Amateur ===
Bourgault was drafted by the Shawinigan Cataractes of the Quebec Major Junior Hockey League (QMJHL) in the second round of the 2018 draft as a centre. However, the Cataractes chose to move him to the wing to play alongside Mavrik Bourque. Making his QMJHL debut with the Cataractes in 2018–19, Bourgault recorded 7 goals and 20 points in 62 games. In 2019–20, he increased his offensive output to 33 goals and 71 points in 63 games, for a 1.13 points per game rate. His points per game rate was raised yet again to 1.38 in 2020–21, as he recorded 20 goals and 40 points in a pandemic-shortened 29 games. Recording only six penalty minutes that season, he was named a finalist for the Frank J. Selke Trophy, the QMJHL's award for sportsmanship. During the 2021–22 season, he had his best year with the Cataractes, scoring 36 goals and 75 points in 43 games. In the playoffs, Bourgault finished second on the team in scoring with 12 goals and 22 points, behind only Bourque, as the Cataractes won the Gilles-Courteau Trophy as league champions. The Cataractes made the 2022 Memorial Cup, but finished third in the four-team tournament, losing to the Hamilton Bulldogs of the Ontario Hockey League in the semi-final.

=== Professional ===
On July 23, 2021, Bourgault was drafted by the Edmonton Oilers of the National Hockey League (NHL) 22nd overall in the first round of 2021 NHL entry draft. Bourgault was signed to a three-year, entry-level contract on March 31, 2022. He was assigned to the Oilers' American Hockey League (AHL) affiliate, the Bakersfield Condors, for the 2022–23 season. In his AHL rookie season, he scored 13 goals and 34 points. He returned to Bakersfield for the 2023–24 season, but saw his offense decline, scoring only 8 goals and 20 points in 55 games.

On July 15, 2024, Bourgault was traded to the Ottawa Senators along with forward Jake Chiasson for forward Roby Järventie and a fourth-round draft pick in 2025. He was assigned to Ottawa's AHL affiliate, the Belleville Senators, to begin the 2024–25 season. In his first season with Belleville, Bourgault added 12 goals and 26 points in 61 games. He was signed to a one-year, two-way contract extension by Ottawa on July 21, 2025. He was assigned to Belleville to start the 2025–26 season. Bourgault was recalled to Ottawa on December 27, and made his NHL debut with Ottawa in a 7–5 loss to the Toronto Maple Leafs. He was sent back to Belleville and was recalled again on January 27, 2026. He appeared in one game with Ottawa before being sent back to the AHL. He finished the season with no points in the two games with Ottawa and 25 goals and 57 points in 70 appearances with Belleville. A restricted free agent in the offseason, he signed a one-year, two-way contract with the Senators on July 9. He was placed on waivers by the Senators at the end of training camp and after going unclaimed, was assigned to Ottawa's AHL affiliate, the Belleville Senators, to start the 2026–27 season.

== International play ==
Bourgault was selected to play for Team Canada at the 2022 World Junior Ice Hockey Championships in December 2021. He played in the opening game against Czechia and was struck in the head, causing him to leave the game. However, the tournament was cancelled shortly afterwards before its completion due to the pandemic and the results were annulled. The tournament was restarted in August 2022, but Bourgault chose to skip it, preferring to focus on making the Oilers.

== Career statistics ==
=== Regular season and playoffs ===
			Regular season					Playoffs
Season	Team	League	GP	G	A	Pts	PIM	GP	G	A	Pts	PIM
2017–18	Lévis Chevaliers	QMAAA	38	13	13	26	12	3	0	0	0	0
2018–19	Shawinigan Cataractes	QMJHL	62	7	13	20	12	6	0	1	1	0
2019–20	Shawinigan Cataractes	QMJHL	63	33	38	71	20	—	—	—	—	—
2020–21	Shawinigan Cataractes	QMJHL	29	20	20	40	6	5	0	4	4	2
2021–22	Shawinigan Cataractes	QMJHL	43	36	39	75	20	16	12	10	22	10
2022–23	Bakersfield Condors	AHL	62	13	21	34	16	2	0	0	0	2
2023–24	Bakersfield Condors	AHL	55	8	12	20	24	2	0	0	0	0
2024–25	Belleville Senators	AHL	61	12	14	26	14	—	—	—	—	—
2025–26	Belleville Senators	AHL	70	25	32	57	34	—	—	—	—	—
2025–26	Ottawa Senators	NHL	2	0	0	0	0	—	—	—	—	—
NHL totals			2	0	0	0	0	—	—	—	—	—

=== International ===
Year	Team	Event	Result	GP	G	A	Pts	PIM
2018	Canada White	U17	6th	5	0	2	2	0
Junior totals				5	0	2	2	0

Awards and achievements
Preceded by Dylan Holloway	Edmonton Oilers' first-round draft pick 2021	Succeeded by Reid Schaefer
