= Xavier Parent =

American ice hockey player (born 2001)

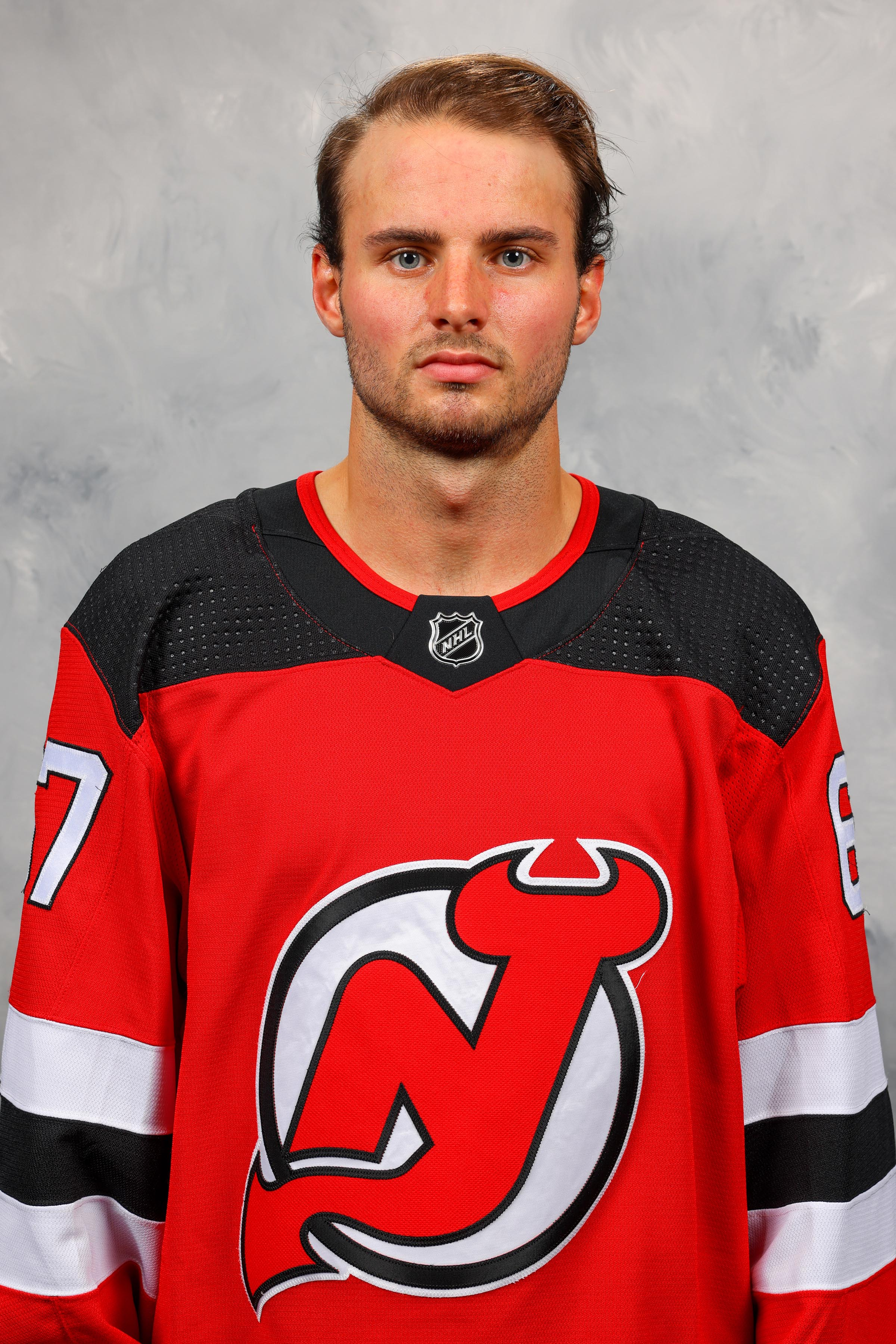
- Parent in 2023
- Born: March 23, 2001 (age 25) Laval, Quebec, Canada
- Height: 5 ft 8 in (173 cm)
- Weight: 170 lb (77 kg; 12 st 2 lb)
- Position: Forward
- Shoots: Left
- NHL team (P) Cur. team: New Jersey Devils; Utica Comets (AHL)
- NHL draft: Undrafted
- Playing career: 2022–present

Xavier Parent (born March 23, 2001) is a Canadian ice hockey forward for the Utica Comets of the American Hockey League (AHL) while under contract to the New Jersey Devils of the National Hockey League (NHL).

== Playing career ==
=== Junior ===
Parent was selected fourth overall in the 2017 Quebec Major Junior Hockey League (QMJHL) draft by the Halifax Mooseheads, for whom he would record 63 points in 130 games over his first two seasons. Following his second season with Halifax, in the summer of 2019, he was traded to the Sherbrooke Phoenix for defenceman Cameron Whynot and a third-round pick in 2021.

Over the next two seasons, Parent would play just 49 games, missing significant time due to the COVID-19 pandemic and a back injury. He was not selected by NHL teams in his draft-eligible seasons.

For the 2021–22 season, he returned to Sherbrooke as an overage player, and was named captain. His production increased dramatically from a point-per-game the year prior to 51 goals and 106 points in 65 games, the fourth most points in the league. After adding 22 points in 11 playoff games, he was named to the QMJHL's second all-star team. Although he was committed to play college ice hockey at the University of Quebec Trois-Rivières, he forwent his commitment and signed a two-year, one-way contract with the Utica Comets of the American Hockey League

=== Professional ===
Parent made his professional debut not with the Comets, but with their ECHL affiliate, the Adirondack Thunder. In his first professional season in 2022–23, he recorded 51 points in 50 games.

In the 2023–24 season, his first full season in the AHL, Parent recorded 15 goals and 45 points in 71 games, including a hat trick, his first in the AHL, against his hometown Laval Rocket.

The Comets re-signed Parent to a one-year contract for the 2024–25 season. He finished the year with 17 goals and 53 points in 61 games.

On March 14, 2025, the Comets' National Hockey League affiliate, the New Jersey Devils, announced that they had signed Parent to a one-year, entry-level contract for the 2025–26 season, his first NHL contract. Although Parent began the year with Utica, he was called up to the Devils after Timo Meier took a personal leave of absence. He made his NHL debut on December 11, 2025, in an 8–4 loss to the Tampa Bay Lightning.

== International play ==
Parent played in two junior-level international tournaments, the 2017 World U-17 Hockey Challenge, where in six games he led Canada Red with seven points on the strength of four goals en route to a silver medal, and the 2018 Hlinka Gretzky Cup, where he recorded two goals and three points in five games for gold-winning Team Canada.

== Career statistics ==
=== Regular season and playoffs ===
Note: GP = Games played; G = Goals; A = Assists; Pts = Points; PIM = Penalty minutes;

			Regular season					Playoffs
Season	Team	League	GP	G	A	Pts	PIM	GP	G	A	Pts	PIM
2017–18	Halifax Mooseheads	QMJHL	63	13	16	29	30	9	4	7	11	14
2018–19	Halifax Mooseheads	QMJHL	67	15	19	34	45	23	4	2	6	18
2019–20	Sherbrooke Phoenix	QMJHL	25	9	10	19	40	—	—	—	—	—
2020–21	Sherbrooke Phoenix	QMJHL	24	14	13	27	35	3	2	2	4	8
2021–22	Sherbrooke Phoenix	QMJHL	65	51	55	106	77	11	9	13	22	12
2022–23	Adirondack Thunder	ECHL	50	23	28	51	46	—	—	—	—	—
2022–23	Utica Comets	AHL	14	3	3	6	6	5	3	1	4	8
2023–24	Utica Comets	AHL	71	15	30	45	56	—	—	—	—	—
2024–25	Utica Comets	AHL	61	17	19	36	59	—	—	—	—	—
2025–26	Utica Comets	AHL	63	20	19	39	80	—	—	—	—	—
2025–26	New Jersey Devils	NHL	5	0	0	0	2	—	—	—	—	—
NHL totals			5	0	0	0	2	—	—	—	—	—

=== International ===
Note: GP = Games played; G = Goals; A = Assists; Pts = Points; PIM = Penalty minutes;

				Regular season
Year	Team	Event	Result	GP	G	A	Pts	PIM
2017	Canada Red	U17	2nd place, silver medalist(s)	6	4	3	7	2
2018	Canada	HG18	1st place, gold medalist(s)	5	2	1	3	0
Junior totals				11	6	4	10	2
