= William Dufour =

Canadian ice hockey player (born 2002)

- Dufour in 2026
- Born: January 28, 2002 (age 24) Quebec City, Quebec, Canada
- Height: 6 ft 2 in (188 cm)
- Weight: 210 lb (95 kg; 15 st 0 lb)
- Position: Right wing
- Shoots: Right
- DEL team Former teams: Nürnberg Ice Tigers; New York Islanders; Lada Togliatti; Fort Wayne Komets
- NHL draft: 152nd overall, 2020; New York Islanders
- Playing career: 2022–present

William Dufour (born January 28, 2002) is a Canadian professional ice hockey player who is a left winger. He is currently playing for the Fort Wayne Komets of the ECHL. He was selected in the fifth round, 152nd overall, by the New York Islanders in the 2020 NHL entry draft. Dufour played four seasons of major junior hockey in the Quebec Major Junior Hockey League (QMJHL) with the Chicoutimi Saguenéens, Drummondville Voltigeurs and Saint John Sea Dogs, winning the Memorial Cup with the latter in 2022.

== Playing career ==
Dufour was drafted by the Rouyn-Noranda Huskies of the Quebec Major Junior Hockey League (QMJHL) with the sixth overall pick of the 2018 QMJHL entry draft. On January 6, 2019, he was traded to the Chicoutimi Saguenéens. His stint with the Saguenéens lasted until December 15, 2019, when he was traded to the Drummondville Voltigeurs. In June 2021, Dufour was traded to the Saint John Sea Dogs.

Dufour was selected in the fifth round, 152nd overall, of the 2020 NHL entry draft by the New York Islanders. On April 21, 2022, Dufour signed a three-year, entry-level contract with the team. In his National Hockey League (NHL) debut on January 18, 2023, Dufour recorded one hit and logged 6:48 minutes of ice time as the Islanders lost 4–1 against the Boston Bruins.

During the 2024–25 season, approaching the NHL trade deadline, Dufour was traded by the Islanders along with Brock Nelson to the Colorado Avalanche in exchange for Calum Ritchie, Oliver Kylington and conditional first and third-round selections on March 6, 2025. Dufour was assigned directly to AHL affiliate, the Colorado Eagles, for the remainder of the season, posting one goal and four points through 12 regular season games.

As a pending restricted free agent, Dufour was not tendered a qualifying offer by the Avalanche, releasing him to free agency. On July 9, 2025, Dufour opted to pursue a career abroad, agreeing to a one-year contract with Russian club, Lada Togliatti of the Kontinental Hockey League (KHL), for the 2025–26 season. Dufour made just seven appearances in the KHL with Togliatti before opting to terminate his contract and return to North America on October 23. After a brief stint in the Ligue Nord-Américaine de Hockey (LNAH), Dufour returned to the AHL in signing a try-out contract with the Wilkes-Barre/Scranton Penguins, the primary affiliate to the Pittsburgh Penguins on November 10, 2025. Dufour posted one goal in six appearances with the Penguins before he was released from his tryout on December 31. On January 26, 2026, Dufour opted to continue his season in the ECHL in signing a contract with the Fort Wayne Komets. In June 2026 he signed with the German team Nürnberg Ice Tigers for the season 2026/27.

== Career statistics ==
=== Regular season and playoffs ===
			Regular season					Playoffs
Season	Team	League	GP	G	A	Pts	PIM	GP	G	A	Pts	PIM
2017–18	Séminaire St-François Blizzard	QMAAA	36	17	19	36	16	6	1	2	3	10
2018–19	Rouyn-Noranda Huskies	QMJHL	29	5	3	8	12	—	—	—	—	—
2018–19	Chicoutimi Saguenéens	QMJHL	26	4	9	13	12	4	1	0	1	2
2019–20	Chicoutimi Saguenéens	QMJHL	31	10	12	22	24	—	—	—	—	—
2019–20	Drummondville Voltigeurs	QMJHL	28	18	15	33	30	—	—	—	—	—
2020–21	Drummondville Voltigeurs	QMJHL	23	17	12	29	32	—	—	—	—	—
2021–22	Saint John Sea Dogs	QMJHL	66	56	60	116	40	5	2	2	4	6
2022–23	Bridgeport Islanders	AHL	69	21	27	48	51	—	—	—	—	—
2022–23	New York Islanders	NHL	1	0	0	0	0	—	—	—	—	—
2023–24	Bridgeport Islanders	AHL	55	15	10	25	35	—	—	—	—	—
2024–25	Bridgeport Islanders	AHL	45	8	10	18	49	—	—	—	—	—
2024–25	Colorado Eagles	AHL	12	1	3	4	8	1	0	0	0	2
2025–26	Lada Togliatti	KHL	7	2	1	3	0	—	—	—	—	—
2025–26	Québec National	LNAH	3	2	2	4	2	—	—	—	—	—
2025–26	Wilkes-Barre/Scranton Penguins	AHL	6	1	0	1	0	—	—	—	—	—
2025–26	Fort Wayne Komets	ECHL	30	17	24	41	8	17	8	11	19	26
2025–26	Grand Rapids Griffins	AHL	4	1	0	1	4	—	—	—	—	—
NHL totals			1	0	0	0	0	—	—	—	—	—

=== International ===
Year	Team	Event	Result	GP	G	A	Pts	PIM
2018	Canada Red	U17	4th	6	2	0	2	2
2022	Canada	WJC	1st place, gold medalist(s)	7	3	4	7	2
Junior totals				13	5	4	9	4

== Awards and honours ==
Award	Year	Ref
QMJHL
First All-Star Team	2022	
Michel Brière Memorial Trophy	2022	
CHL
Memorial Cup champion	2022	
Memorial Cup All-Star Team	2022	
Ed Chynoweth Trophy	2022	
Stafford Smythe Memorial Trophy	2022	
