= Oliver Kylington =

Swedish ice hockey player (born 1997)

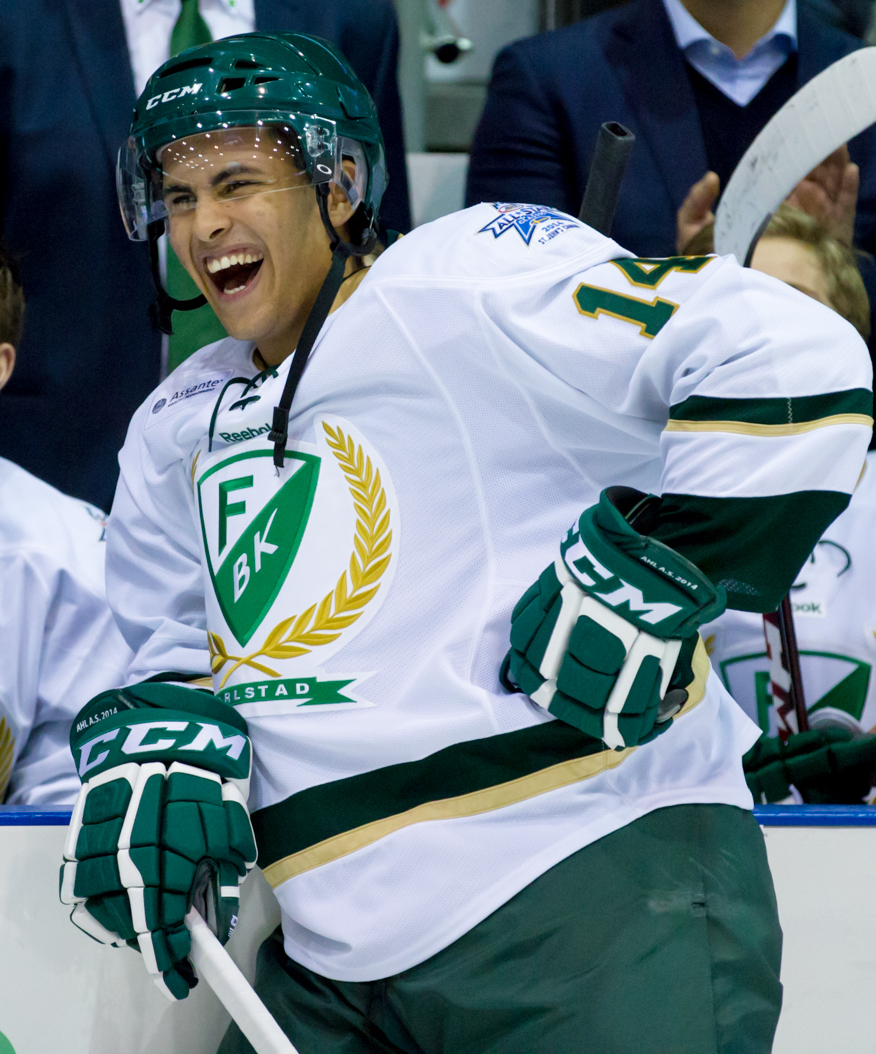
- Kylington with Färjestad BK in 2014
- Born: 19 May 1997 (age 29) Stockholm, Sweden
- Height: 6 ft 0 in (183 cm)
- Weight: 183 lb (83 kg; 13 st 1 lb)
- Position: Defence
- Shoots: Left
- team Former teams: Free agent Färjestad BK; Calgary Flames; Colorado Avalanche; Anaheim Ducks; Djurgårdens IF
- NHL draft: 60th overall, 2015; Calgary Flames
- Playing career: 2013–present

Oliver Kylington (/ˈtʃɪlɪŋtən/ CHIL-ing-tən; born 19 May 1997) is a Swedish professional ice hockey defenceman who is currently an unrestricted free agent. He most recently played for Djurgårdens IF of the Swedish Hockey League (SHL). He previously played in the National Hockey League (NHL) for the Calgary Flames, who drafted him 60th overall in the 2015 NHL entry draft, Colorado Avalanche and Anaheim Ducks.

== Early life ==
Kylington was born in Stockholm to a Swedish father and an Eritrean mother. His mother, Teber Zeru, settled in Sweden as a teenage refugee from the Eritrean War of Independence. She and Kylington's father Börje met in Stockholm. By the time he reached adulthood, all of Kylington's mother's family lived in Sweden.

Kylington grew up in Sundbyberg in the Stockholm urban area, where he played handball, floorball, football, and ice hockey. Since his childhood, he has been mentored by Johnny Oduya, to whom he was introduced by his father.

== Playing career ==
Kylington made his Swedish Hockey League (SHL) debut as a 16-year-old playing with Färjestad BK during the 2013–14 season. He scored his first goal in September 2013, becoming the youngest player to score in the SHL at 16 years, 4 months, and 9 days old. On 10 January 2014, having impressed at SHL level, Kylington was signed to a two-year contract extension to remain with Färjestad BK. His Kontinental Hockey League (KHL) rights were attained by Avangard Omsk who drafted him 107th overall in the 2014 KHL Junior Draft.

During his second SHL season in 2014–15, Kylington was loaned by Färjestads to HockeyAllsvenskan team, AIK on 10 November 2014. He produced four goals and seven points, the most in the Allsvenskan by an under-18 player, in 17 games with AIK before returning to Färjestad to finish the season ranked in the top-ten European skaters to be eligible for the 2015 NHL entry draft. On 13 May 2015, with the intention of more playing time to further his development, it was announced Kylington had agreed to a two-year contract to return to AIK of the Allsvenskan.

Kylington was drafted in the second round, 60th overall, by the Calgary Flames in the 2015 NHL entry draft. On 15 July 2015, he signed a three-year, entry-level contract with the team. On the direction of the Flames organization, Kylington decided against continuing with AIK and remained in North America to be assigned to their American Hockey League (AHL) affiliate, the Stockton Heat, to begin the 2015–16 season. On 9 April 2016, Kylington made his NHL debut in a game against the Minnesota Wild.

Kylington began the 2018–19 season in the American Hockey League with the Stockton Heat. He was recalled to the NHL and recorded his first career NHL goal in a 5–2 win over the Nashville Predators.

During the 2021–22 season, Kylington posted career-highs in goals, assists, and points with the Flames. He recorded three points in twelve games during the 2022 Stanley Cup playoffs before the Flames were eliminated by the Edmonton Oilers in the Second Round.

Shortly before the start of the 2022–23 season, Flames general manager Brad Treliving stated that Kylington would miss the start of training camp. In November 2022, Treliving stated that Kylington had returned to Sweden to attend to an undisclosed personal matter. By February 2023, Kylington did not return to the Flames and stayed in Sweden. He returned to the Flames' training camp the following season but was unable to participate due to personal matters.

After missing the whole of the 2022–23 season, Kylington was eventually able to return to the Flames midway through the 2023–24 season, starting his first game in eighteen months on 25 January 2024. He appeared in 33 games, managing three goals and five assists. In recognition of his return to the lineup, he was voted a finalist for the Bill Masterton Memorial Trophy, awarded by the Professional Hockey Writers' Association to the player who "best exemplifies the qualities of perseverance, sportsmanship and dedication to hockey."

As a free agent following the 2023–24 season, Kylington signed a one-year contract with the Colorado Avalanche on 5 August 2024. In the 2024–25 season, Kylington was continually hampered by injury in his tenure with the Avalanche, and was limited to just 13 games in posting one goal and three assists for four points. Approaching the NHL trade deadline, Kylington was originally traded by Colorado, along with Calum Ritchie and conditional first-round and third-round selections to the New York Islanders in exchange for Brock Nelson and William Dufour on 6 March 2025. He was immediately flipped by the Islanders to the Anaheim Ducks in exchange for future considerations. Kylington played out the remainder of the season with Ducks, registering one assist through six appearances.

As a free agent from the Ducks, Kylington went unsigned over the summer. Approaching the 2025–26 season, he accepted an invitation from the Carolina Hurricanes to attend training camp on a professional tryout on 28 August 2025, but was cut near the end of the preseason.

On 18 October 2025, Djurgårdens IF of the Swedish Hockey League (SHL) signed Kylington to a one-year contract.

== Career statistics ==
=== Regular season and playoffs ===
			Regular season					Playoffs
Season	Team	League	GP	G	A	Pts	PIM	GP	G	A	Pts	PIM
2011–12	Djurgårdens IF	J18	8	0	3	3	2	—	—	—	—	—
2011–12	Djurgårdens IF	J18 Allsv	5	0	0	0	2	—	—	—	—	—
2012–13	Södertälje SK	J18	2	0	0	0	0	—	—	—	—	—
2012–13	Södertälje SK	J18 Allsv	1	0	0	0	0	—	—	—	—	—
2012–13	Södertälje SK	J20	39	3	10	13	12	3	0	1	1	0
2013–14	Färjestad BK	J18	2	1	2	3	2	—	—	—	—	—
2013–14	Färjestad BK	J20	21	5	16	21	22	2	3	0	3	0
2013–14	Färjestad BK	SHL	32	2	4	6	6	12	0	2	2	2
2014–15	Färjestad BK	J20	10	4	3	7	2	6	0	5	5	6
2014–15	Färjestad BK	SHL	18	2	3	5	4	—	—	—	—	—
2014–15	AIK	Allsv	17	4	3	7	6	—	—	—	—	—
2015–16	Stockton Heat	AHL	47	5	7	12	14	—	—	—	—	—
2015–16	Calgary Flames	NHL	1	0	0	0	0	—	—	—	—	—
2016–17	Stockton Heat	AHL	60	6	21	27	22	5	0	1	1	0
2017–18	Stockton Heat	AHL	62	7	28	35	18	—	—	—	—	—
2018–19	Stockton Heat	AHL	18	7	7	14	8	—	—	—	—	—
2018–19	Calgary Flames	NHL	38	3	5	8	10	—	—	—	—	—
2019–20	Calgary Flames	NHL	48	2	5	7	16	—	—	—	—	—
2019–20	Stockton Heat	AHL	3	3	0	3	0	—	—	—	—	—
2020–21	Calgary Flames	NHL	8	0	1	1	0	—	—	—	—	—
2021–22	Calgary Flames	NHL	73	9	22	31	14	12	1	2	3	8
2023–24	Calgary Wranglers	AHL	2	0	0	0	4	—	—	—	—	—
2023–24	Calgary Flames	NHL	33	3	5	8	12	—	—	—	—	—
2024–25	Colorado Avalanche	NHL	13	1	3	4	4	—	—	—	—	—
2024–25	Anaheim Ducks	NHL	6	0	1	1	4	—	—	—	—	—
2025–26	Djurgårdens IF	SHL	25	2	6	8	10	3	0	0	0	0
SHL totals			75	6	13	19	20	15	0	2	2	2
NHL totals			220	18	42	60	60	12	1	2	3	8

=== International ===
Year	Team	Event	Result	GP	G	A	Pts	PIM
2014	Sweden	IH18	4th	5	1	2	3	2
2015	Sweden	WJC18	8th	5	0	2	2	4
2017	Sweden	WJC	4th	7	0	4	4	8
Junior totals				17	1	8	9	14
