= Jacob Gaucher =

Canadian ice hockey player (born 2001)

- Born: March 9, 2001 (age 25) Longueuil, Quebec, Canada
- Height: 6 ft 3 in (191 cm)
- Weight: 185 lb (84 kg; 13 st 3 lb)
- Position: Centre
- Shoots: Right
- NHL team (P) Cur. team: Philadelphia Flyers; Lehigh Valley Phantoms (AHL)
- NHL draft: Undrafted
- Playing career: 2022–present

Jacob Gaucher (born March 9, 2001) is a Canadian professional ice hockey forward for the Lehigh Valley Phantoms in the American Hockey League (AHL) while under contract to the Philadelphia Flyers of the National Hockey League (NHL).

== Playing career ==
Gaucher played major junior hockey in the Quebec Major Junior Hockey League (QMJHL) with Val-d'Or Foreurs and Baie-Comeau Drakkar before signing his first professional contract with the Lehigh Valley Phantoms of the American Hockey League on October 3, 2022. During his first two professional seasons, he split time with both the Phantoms and their ECHL affiliate, the Reading Royals.

Continuing for a third season within the Phantoms organization, Gaucher signed a one-year AHL contract on August 8, 2024. During the 2024–25 season, Gaucher was signed a two-year entry-level NHL contract with the Phantoms’ NHL affiliate, the Philadelphia Flyers on December 12, 2024.

Gaucher later received his first recall by the Flyers and made his NHL debut in a 3-0 defeat to the Colorado Avalanche on February 2, 2025.

== Personal life ==
Gaucher's brother, Nathan Gaucher, was drafted in the first round of the 2022 NHL entry draft by the Anaheim Ducks.

== Career statistics ==
			Regular season					Playoffs
Season	Team	League	GP	G	A	Pts	PIM	GP	G	A	Pts	PIM
2017–18	Val-d'Or Foreurs	QMJHL	10	0	0	0	4	—	—	—	—	—
2018–19	Val-d'Or Foreurs	QMJHL	68	12	12	24	22	7	0	2	2	4
2019–20	Val-d'Or Foreurs	QMJHL	62	14	24	38	38	—	—	—	—	—
2020–21	Val-d'Or Foreurs	QMJHL	36	4	7	11	31	12	2	5	7	9
2021–22	Baie-Comeau Drakkar	QMJHL	66	35	33	68	26	4	0	3	3	2
2022–23	Reading Royals	ECHL	71	22	39	61	30	11	6	6	12	6
2023–24	Lehigh Valley Phantoms	AHL	59	8	8	16	41	6	1	1	2	0
2023–24	Reading Royals	ECHL	3	0	0	0	0	—	—	—	—	—
2024–25	Lehigh Valley Phantoms	AHL	70	20	18	38	47	7	3	3	6	4
2024–25	Philadelphia Flyers	NHL	4	0	0	0	0	—	—	—	—	—
2025–26	Lehigh Valley Phantoms	AHL	69	20	16	36	44	—	—	—	—	—
2025–26	Philadelphia Flyers	NHL	4	0	0	0	0	—	—	—	—	—
NHL totals			8	0	0	0	0	—	—	—	—	—
