= Jakub Brabenec =

Czech ice hockey player (born 2003)

- Born: 11 September 2003 (age 22) Brno, Czech Republic
- Height: 6 ft 2 in (188 cm)
- Weight: 176 lb (80 kg; 12 st 8 lb)
- Position: Centre / Left wing
- Shoots: Left
- ELH team: HC Kometa Brno
- NHL draft: 102nd overall, 2021; Vegas Golden Knights
- Playing career: 2019–present

Jakub Brabenec (born 11 September 2003) is a Czech professional ice hockey who is a forward for HC Kometa Brno of the Czech Extraliga. He previously played for the Henderson Silver Knights of the American Hockey League (AHL), as well as HC Stadion Litoměřice and SK Horácká Slavia Třebíč of the Chance Liga, and the Charlottetown Islanders and Sherbrooke Phoenix in the Quebec Major Junior Hockey League (QMJHL).

== Playing career ==
Brabenec began his career with the youth teams of HC Kometa Brno in his hometown of Brno. Having already played at senior level on loan at second-tier HC Stadion Litoměřice during the 2019–20 season, he made his Czech Extraliga debut with Brno aged 16 on 18 February 2020, scoring the opening goal of the game against Mountfield HK of Hradec Králové (he became the joint-fourth youngest scorer in the league's history – future NHL man Pavel Zacha first found the net at exactly the same age in 2013). Soon afterwards that season was curtailed due to the COVID-19 pandemic, with the playoffs cancelled. He was a first-round pick by the Charlottetown Islanders of the Quebec Major Junior Hockey League in the 2020 CHL Import Draft, but due to complications of the pandemic he did not move to Canada at that point, instead he remained with Brno and made 23 regular season appearances in the 2020–21 Czech Extraliga season, though only provided one assist, and had a short loan with SK Horácká Slavia Třebíč. In the 2021 NHL entry draft, Brabenec was selected in the fourth round (102nd overall) by the Vegas Golden Knights.

He completed his move to Charlottetown ahead of the 2021–22 QMJHL season and contributed 83 points across 73 appearances in the regular season and playoffs as the team from Prince Edward Island enjoyed one of their strongest campaigns, reaching the President's Cup finals for the first time, though they lost out to the Shawinigan Cataractes. He was awarded the RDS Cup as the league's Rookie of the Year and the Michel Bergeron Trophy as Best Offensive Rookie. In December of that year he agreed to a three-year entry-level contract with Vegas Golden Knights.

Brabanec began the following season at Charlottetown, but in January 2023 they decided to capitalise on his value after a strong showing at the 2023 World Junior Ice Hockey Championships and traded him to the Sherbrooke Phoenix in a player-plus-draft-picks trade deal. The Phoenix advanced to the playoffs semi-finals but were eliminated by the Halifax Mooseheads despite winning the first two games of the series on the road. Ahead of the 2023–24 season Brabanec attended the Vegas Golden Knights training camp but was sent to local farm team, the Henderson Silver Knights of the AHL, along with compatriot Jiří Patera, a goaltender who already played two NHL games for Vegas.

Following three seasons in Vegas' organization, Brabenec returned to Czechia, signing a two-year contract with a third-year option to return to Kometa Brno on 18 May 2026.

== International play ==
Medal record

Representing Czech Republic

Ice hockey

World Junior Championships
Silver medal – second place	2023 Canada	

Brabenec represented the Czech Republic at the 2021 IIHF World U18 Championships where he appeared in five games and made four assists.

He was named in the original Czech Republic squad for the 2022 World Junior Ice Hockey Championships which originally began in December 2021 (he played in two matches with one assist), but those results were annulled due to the COVID-19 cancellation of the tournament, and when it was replayed in August 2022 he did not take part. He again represented the Czech Republic at the 2023 World Junior Ice Hockey Championships where he recorded one goal and six assists in seven games and won a silver medal (he was named his team's MVP in the overtime loss to Canada).

== Family ==
His father Kamil Brabenec was a professional ice hockey player who made 15 international appearances for the Czech Republic and played domestically for teams including Kometa Brno, as well as for clubs in Sweden, Slovakia and Italy. He was on the Brno coaching staff (and had not yet officially retired as a player) when his son made his senior debut with the team in 2020.

Jakub's grandfather, also named Kamil, was an international basketball player for Czechoslovakia in the 1970s and 80s; his aunt Andrea Brabencová and elder sister Kristýna Brabencová also played that sport at a high level.

== Career statistics ==
=== Regular season and playoffs ===
			Regular season					Playoffs
Season	Team	League	GP	G	A	Pts	PIM	GP	G	A	Pts	PIM
2019–20	HC Kometa Brno	ELH	2	1	0	1	0	—	—	—	—	—
2019–20	HC Stadion Litoměřice	Czech.1	10	0	0	0	0	—	—	—	—	—
2020–21	HC Kometa Brno	ELH	23	0	1	1	4	—	—	—	—	—
2020–21	SK Horácká Slavia Třebíč	Czech.1	3	0	0	0	0	—	—	—	—	—
2021–22	Charlottetown Islanders	QMJHL	58	17	47	64	8	15	5	14	19	14
2022–23	Charlottetown Islanders	QMJHL	28	8	17	25	16	—	—	—	—	—
2022–23	Sherbrooke Phoenix	QMJHL	26	10	25	35	10	14	2	7	9	12
2023–24	Henderson Silver Knights	AHL	48	6	7	13	16	—	—	—	—	—
2024–25	Henderson Silver Knights	AHL	62	9	13	22	12	—	—	—	—	—
2025–26	Henderson Silver Knights	AHL	62	12	19	31	34	6	0	0	0	0
ELH totals			25	1	1	2	4	—	—	—	—	—

=== International play ===
Year	Team	Event	Result	GP	G	A	Pts	PIM
2019	Czech Republic	U17	3rd place, bronze medalist(s)	6	0	0	0	0
2021	Czech Republic	U18	7th	5	0	4	4	2
2023	Czech Republic	WJC	2nd place, silver medalist(s)	7	1	6	7	10
Junior totals				18	1	10	11	12

== Awards and honours ==
Award	Year
QMJHL
Rookie of the Year (RDS Cup)	2022
Offensive Rookie of the Year (Michel Bergeron Trophy)	2022
All-Rookie Team	2022
