= Roby Järventie =

Finnish ice hockey player (born 2002)

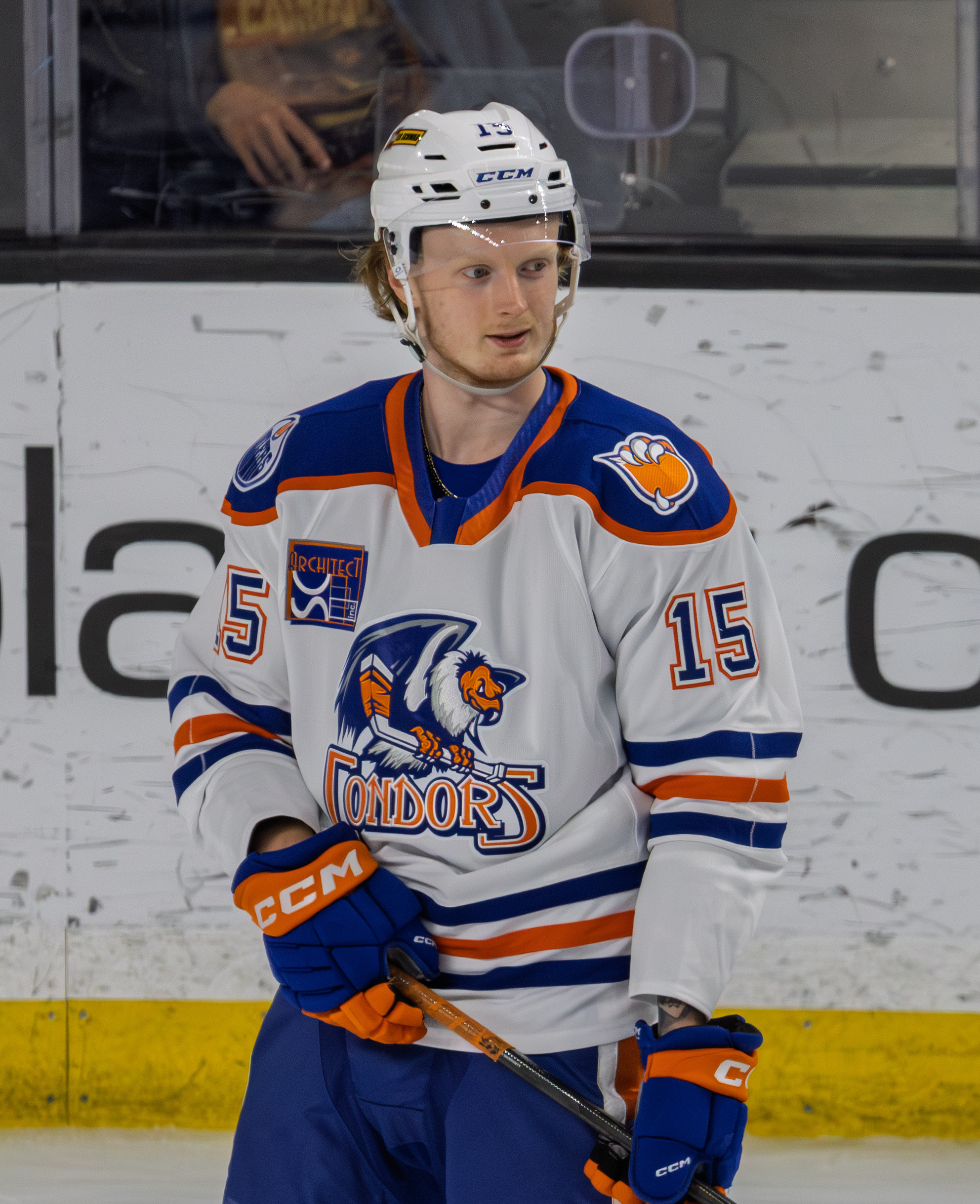
- Järventie with the Bakersfield Condors in 2026
- Born: 8 August 2002 (age 24) Tampere, Finland
- Height: 6 ft 2 in (188 cm)
- Weight: 184 lb (83 kg; 13 st 2 lb)
- Position: Left wing
- Shoots: Left
- NL team Former teams: HC Ambrì-Piotta; Ilves; Ottawa Senators; Edmonton Oilers
- NHL draft: 33rd overall, 2020; Ottawa Senators
- Playing career: 2019–present

Roby Järventie is a Finnish professional ice hockey left winger for HC Ambrì-Piotta of the National League (NL). Järventie was drafted by the Ottawa Senators of the National Hockey League (NHL) in the 2020 NHL entry draft. Järventie played professionally for Ilves in Finland before coming to North America in 2021. He has also played for the Edmonton Oilers of the NHL.

== Playing career ==
=== Finland ===
Järventie split the COVID-19 pandemic-shortened 2019–20 season between Ilves of Liiga and KooVee Tampere of the second-tier Finnish league Mestis, tallying one goal in five games with Ilves and 23 goals and 15 assists for 38 points in 36 appearances with KooVee. In his first full season with Ilves in the pandemic-shortened 2020–21, he finished fifth in team scoring and the highest scoring rookie on the team with 14 goals and 25 points in 48 games.

=== Ottawa Senators ===
Järventie was drafted by the Ottawa Senators of the National Hockey League (NHL) with the 33rd overall pick in the second round of the 2020 NHL entry draft. On 27 April 2021, Järventie was signed to a three-year, entry-level deal with the Senators. He signed an amateur tryout contract with Ottawa's American Hockey League (AHL) affiliate, the Belleville Senators and made four appearances, scoring two goals and three points. Järventie was assigned to Belleville for the 2022–23 season. Early in the season, he suffered a significant knee injury that sidelined him for three months. He returned to Belleville's lineup in March. On 8 October 2023, despite a strong training camp, Järventie was sent to Belleville to start the 2023–24 season. Järventie was recalled to Ottawa and made his NHL debut on 4 November, against the Tampa Bay Lightning at Ottawa. He played in seven games before being returned to Belleville on 26 November. However, a recurring knee injury required surgery in late February 2024, ending his season.

=== Edmonton Oilers ===
On 15 July 2024, Järventie and a fourth-round pick for the 2025 NHL entry draft were traded to the Edmonton Oilers, in exchange for Xavier Bourgault and Jake Chiasson. Further surgery on his knee during the offseason forced him to miss the Oilers 2024 training camp. He began the season on the Oilers' injured reserve (IR) list. He was activated off IR on 25 October and assigned to Edmonton's AHL affiliate, the Bakersfield Condors. He played two games with Bakersfield before re-injuring his knee. On 7 May 2025, it was announced that he had left Bakersfield and signed a three-year contract with Tappara of Liiga, but never played a game with them. He signed a one-year, two-way contract with Edmonton on 3 June. During the 2025 training camp, he was placed on waivers and after going unclaimed, was assigned to Bakersfield to start the 2025–26 season. He was recalled by Edmonton on 19 March 2026 after Leon Draisaitl was injured. He made his NHL season debut on 21 March in a 5–2 loss to the Tampa Bay Lightning. He appeared in two more games, going scoreless in all of them, before being reassigned to Bakersfield on 31 March. In 61 games with Bakersfield, he recorded 23 goals and 47 points. The Condors qualified for the playoffs and faced the Coachella Valley Firebirds in the playoffs. The Firebirds eliminated the Condors in three games. In the series, Järventie tallied two assists.

=== HC Ambrì-Piotta ===
After the conclusion of the season, Järventie signed a two-year deal with Swiss club, HC Ambrì-Piotta of the National League (NL) on 5 May 2026.

== International career ==
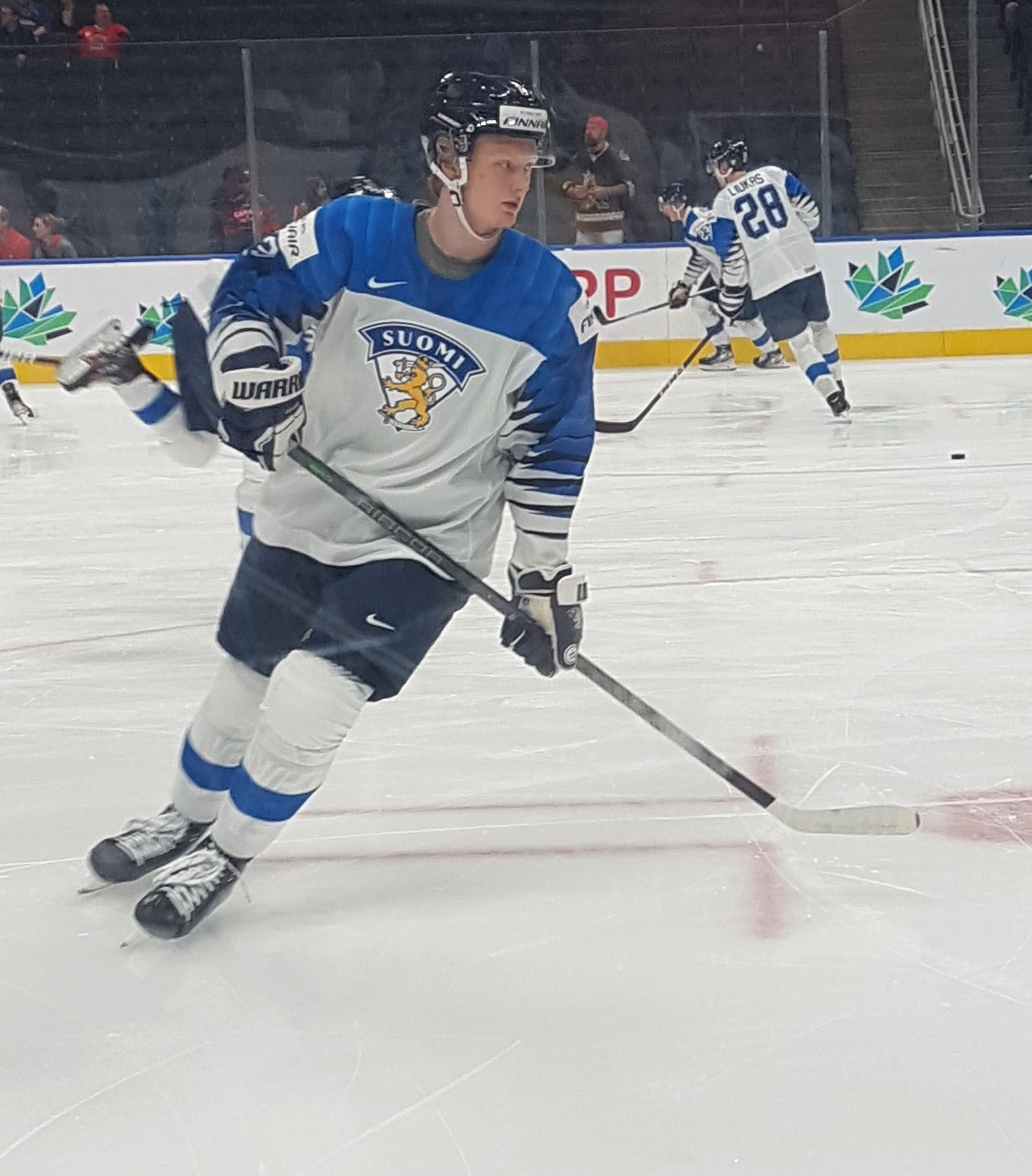
- Järventie at the 2022 World Junior Ice Hockey Championships

Medal record

Ice hockey

Representing Finland

World Junior Championships
Silver medal – second place	2022 Canada	
Bronze medal – third place	2021 Canada	

Järventie played for the Finnish junior team twice during the IIHF World Junior Championships, in 2021 and 2022. Järventie won the bronze medal with Finland in 2021, playing in six games. In the 2022 championship, Järventie has a four-point game versus Germany in the quarterfinals. Finland faced Canada in the final, but lost 3–2 in overtime in the final, winning the silver medal.

== Personal life ==
Järventie has a brother, Emil, who was a seventh-round draft pick of the Pittsburgh Penguins in the 2023 NHL entry draft and also plays for Tappara in Finland.

== Career statistics ==
=== Regular season and playoffs ===
			Regular season					Playoffs
Season	Team	League	GP	G	A	Pts	PIM	GP	G	A	Pts	PIM
2018–19	Ilves	Jr. A	40	14	17	31	42	—	—	—	—	—
2019–20	Ilves	Jr. A	5	2	0	2	4	—	—	—	—	—
2019–20	KOOVEE	Mestis	36	23	15	38	56	—	—	—	—	—
2019–20	Ilves	Liiga	5	1	0	1	4	—	—	—	—	—
2020–21	Ilves	Liiga	48	14	11	25	16	5	0	1	1	4
2020–21	Belleville Senators	AHL	4	2	1	3	4	—	—	—	—	—
2021–22	Belleville Senators	AHL	70	11	22	33	42	2	1	0	1	0
2022–23	Belleville Senators	AHL	40	16	14	30	38	—	—	—	—	—
2023–24	Belleville Senators	AHL	22	9	11	20	22	—	—	—	—	—
2023–24	Ottawa Senators	NHL	7	0	1	1	4	—	—	—	—	—
2024–25	Bakersfield Condors	AHL	2	0	2	2	0	—	—	—	—	—
2025–26	Bakersfield Condors	AHL	61	23	24	47	30	3	0	2	2	2
2025–26	Edmonton Oilers	NHL	3	0	0	0	0	—	—	—	—	—
Liiga totals			53	15	11	26	20	5	0	1	1	4
NHL totals			10	0	1	1	4	—	—	—	—	—

=== International ===
Year	Team	Event	Result	GP	G	A	Pts	PIM
2018	Finland	U17	2nd place, silver medalist(s)	6	1	0	1	0
2019	Finland	HG18	4th	3	1	0	1	0
2021	Finland	WJC	3rd place, bronze medalist(s)	6	0	0	0	0
2022	Finland	WJC	2nd place, silver medalist(s)	7	4	5	9	4
Junior totals				22	6	5	11	4
