= Maxim Barbashev =

Russian ice hockey forward

- Born: 18 December 2003 (age 22) Moscow, Russia
- Height: 6 ft 2 in (188 cm)
- Weight: 191 lb (87 kg; 13 st 9 lb)
- Position: Left wing
- Shoots: Left
- ECHL team Former teams: New Mexico Goatheads; Hartford Wolf Pack; Tucson Roadrunners
- NHL draft: 161st overall, 2022; New York Rangers
- Playing career: 2024–present

Maxim Dmitrievich Barbashev (Russian: Максим Дмитриевич Барбашев; born December 18, 2003) is a Russian professional ice hockey left winger who is currently under contract with the New Mexico Goatheads in the ECHL. He was selected in the fifth round, 161st overall, by the New York Rangers in the 2022 NHL Entry Draft.

== Early life ==
Barbashev was born in Moscow, Russia. He comes from a prominent hockey-playing family; his eldest brother, Sergei Barbashev, is a long-time professional forward in Russia's VHL, and his middle brother, Ivan Barbashev, is a multi-time Stanley Cup champion forward playing for the Vegas Golden Knights of the National Hockey League (NHL).

== Playing career ==
=== Junior ===
Barbashev transitioned to North American major junior hockey for the 2020–21 season, joining the Moncton Wildcats of the Quebec Maritimes Junior Hockey League (QMJHL) after being selected in the 2020 CHL Import Draft. He appeared in 10 games during a pandemic-disrupted freshman campaign, scoring 6 goals and 10 points.

During his second season with Moncton (2021–22), Barbashev played a full complement of 59 regular season games, recording 15 goals and 27 assists for 42 points. Following this development year, he was chosen 161st overall by the New York Rangers at the 2022 NHL Entry Draft. He returned to Moncton for the 2022–23 campaign, enjoying a breakout season where he achieved career-highs in all offensive categories. Barbashev registered 32 goals and 33 assists for 65 points in 67 games, ranking second on the Wildcats roster in goals and fourth in total points.

Ahead of his final junior season in 2023–24, Barbashev was traded to the Shawinigan Cataractes. He recorded 9 points in 15 games for Shawinigan before a mid-season trade sent him to the Rimouski Océanic, where he completed his junior eligibility by contributing 14 goals and 35 points in 44 games. Over his five-year QMJHL career, Barbashev totaled 152 points (67 goals, 85 assists) in 195 regular season matches.

=== Professional ===
On August 1, 2024, Barbashev signed his first professional contract, securing a one-year AHL contract with the New York Rangers' primary affiliate, the Hartford Wolf Pack. He made his professional debut with the Wolf Pack during the 2024–25 AHL season, scoring one goal and one assist across 7 games. To receive expanded ice time, he spent the majority of his rookie season assigned to the Bloomington Bison of the ECHL, where he suited up in 36 games and scored 12 points.

Following the expiration of his contract with Hartford, Barbashev attended the 2025 training camp of the NHL's Utah Mammoth on a professional tryout agreement (PTO). Although released from his NHL tryout, he subsequently signed an AHL contract with the Tucson Roadrunners ahead of the 2025–26 season, and was initially assigned to their ECHL affiliate, the Utah Grizzlies.

Barbashev excelled with Utah, posting 3 goals and 6 assists for 9 points along with 13 penalty minutes in 20 games. On January 24, 2026, the Tucson Roadrunners officially recalled Barbashev from his ECHL stint back up to the AHL roster.

As a free agent at the conclusion of his contract with the Roadrunners, Barbashev was signed to a contract with the New Mexico Goatheads for their inaugural season in the ECHL on August 7, 2026.

== Career statistics ==
			Regular season					Playoffs
Season	Team	League	GP	G	A	Pts	PIM	GP	G	A	Pts	PIM
2020–21	Moncton Wildcats	QMJHL	10	6	4	10	12	6	2	0	2	8
2021–22	Moncton Wildcats	QMJHL	59	15	27	42	66	3	1	0	1	6
2022–23	Moncton Wildcats	QMJHL	67	32	33	65	51	12	4	4	8	14
2023–24	Shawinigan Cataractes	QMJHL	15	2	7	9	10	—	—	—	—	—
2023–24	Rimouski Océanic	QMJHL	44	12	14	26	28	5	0	2	2	0
2023–24	Hartford Wolf Pack	AHL	1	0	0	0	0	—	—	—	—	—
2024–25	Hartford Wolf Pack	AHL	6	1	1	2	8	—	—	—	—	—
2024–25	Bloomington Bison	ECHL	36	3	5	8	12	—	—	—	—	—
2025–26	Tucson Roadrunners	AHL	3	0	0	0	0	—	—	—	—	—
2025–26	Utah Grizzlies	ECHL	36	7	10	17	27	—	—	—	—	—
2025–26	Allen Americans	ECHL	14	2	2	4	4	9	1	1	2	2
AHL totals			10	1	1	2	8	—	—	—	—	—
