= Nathan Gaucher =

Canadian ice hockey player (born 2003)

- Born: November 6, 2003 (age 22) Longueuil, Quebec, Canada
- Height: 6 ft 3 in (191 cm)
- Weight: 207 lb (94 kg; 14 st 11 lb)
- Position: Centre
- Shoots: Right
- NHL team (P) Cur. team: Anaheim Ducks; San Diego Gulls (AHL)
- NHL draft: 22nd overall, 2022; Anaheim Ducks
- Playing career: 2023–present

Nathan Gaucher (born November 6, 2003) is a Canadian professional ice hockey centre for the San Diego Gulls of the American Hockey League (AHL) as a prospect to the Anaheim Ducks of the National Hockey League (NHL). He was drafted 22nd overall by the Ducks in the 2022 NHL entry draft.

== Playing career ==
Gaucher played with Saint-Hyacinthe Gaulois in the Quebec Junior AAA Hockey League (QMAAA) before he was selected 8th overall in the 2019 QMJHL Entry Draft by the Quebec Remparts.

In his draft-eligible season with the Remparts in 2021–22, Gaucher was awarded the Michael Bossy Trophy as the QMJHL's Best Professional Prospect after scoring 31 goals and 26 assists for 57 points in 66 games. Ranked a mid-first round draft selection leading into the 2022 NHL entry draft by NHL Central Scouting Bureau, Gaucher was selected 22nd overall by the Anaheim Ducks on July 7, 2022. Later that month, Gaucher was signed to his first NHL contract by the Ducks agreeing to a three-year, entry-level contract on July 29, 2022.

Gaucher appeared in only 44 games for the Remparts in the 2022–23 season, but distinguished himself as a defensive forward with 22 goals and 24 assists, a 59.4% success rate at face-offs, and a plus–minus rating of +35, one of the best in the league. After the season, he was awarded the Guy Carbonneau Trophy as the league's best defensive forward. The Remparts finished first in the regular season, earning the Jean Rougeau Trophy.

Gaucher managed 7 goals and 9 assists in 18 playoff games as the Remparts advanced to the QMJHL Finals and won the Gilles-Courteau Trophy, the franchise's first league championship in 47 years. As QMJHL champions, the Remparts were the league's representatives at the 2023 Memorial Cup in Kamloops, playing against the host Blazers, the Peterborough Petes, and the Seattle Thunderbirds. The Remparts ultimately defeated the Thunderbirds in the Memorial Cup final, taking the championship for the third time in team history.

Gaucher made his NHL debut on April 1, 2026, against the San Jose Sharks.

== International play ==
Medal record

Representing Canada

Ice hockey

World Junior Championships
Gold medal – first place	2022 Canada	
Gold medal – first place	2023 Canada	

Gaucher was named to Team Canada for the COVID-delayed 2022 World Junior Ice Hockey Championships, winning gold.

On December 12, 2022, Gaucher was named to Team Canada to compete at the 2023 World Junior Ice Hockey Championships. During the tournament, he recorded one goal and three assists in seven games and won a gold medal.

== Career statistics ==
=== Regular season and playoffs ===
			Regular season					Playoffs
Season	Team	League	GP	G	A	Pts	PIM	GP	G	A	Pts	PIM
2018–19	Saint-Hyacinthe Gaulois	QMAAA	42	18	15	33	48	6	4	2	6	4
2019–20	Quebec Remparts	QMJHL	59	13	11	24	24	—	—	—	—	—
2020–21	Quebec Remparts	QMJHL	30	14	17	31	22	6	1	3	4	4
2021–22	Quebec Remparts	QMJHL	66	31	26	57	74	12	3	6	9	12
2022–23	Quebec Remparts	QMJHL	44	22	24	46	67	18	7	9	16	20
2023–24	San Diego Gulls	AHL	72	10	15	25	68	—	—	—	—	—
2024–25	San Diego Gulls	AHL	56	8	11	19	79	—	—	—	—	—
2025–26	San Diego Gulls	AHL	62	15	14	29	47	2	0	0	0	4
2025–26	Anaheim Ducks	NHL	3	0	0	0	0	—	—	—	—	—
NHL totals			3	0	0	0	0	—	—	—	—	—

=== International ===
Year	Team	Event	Result	GP	G	A	Pts	PIM
2019	Canada Red	U17	5th	5	2	3	5	16
2022	Canada	WJC	1st place, gold medalist(s)	7	1	1	2	4
2023	Canada	WJC	1st place, gold medalist(s)	7	1	3	4	10
Junior totals				19	4	7	11	30

== Awards and honours ==
Award	Year
CHL
Memorial Cup champion	2023
QMJHL
Michael Bossy Trophy	2022
Guy Carbonneau Trophy	2023
Gilles-Courteau Trophy champion	2023

Awards and achievements
Preceded by Pavel Mintyukov	Anaheim Ducks first-round draft pick 2022	Succeeded by Leo Carlsson
