= Yan Kuznetsov =

Russian ice hockey player (born 2002)

- Born: 9 March 2002 (age 24) Murmansk, Russia
- Height: 6 ft 4 in (193 cm)
- Weight: 209 lb (95 kg; 14 st 13 lb)
- Position: Defence
- Shoots: Left
- NHL team: Calgary Flames
- NHL draft: 50th overall, 2020; Calgary Flames
- Playing career: 2021–present

Yan Kuznetsov (Russian: Ян Кузнецов; born 9 March 2002) is a Russian professional ice hockey player who is a defenceman for the Calgary Flames of the National Hockey League (NHL).

== Playing career ==
As a youth, Kuznetsov played in his native Russia, within CSKA Moscow under-16 and under-18 programs before moving to North America to continue his development through the United States Hockey League (USHL) with the Sioux Falls Stampede and at the collegiate level.

Following his freshman season with University of Connecticut in the Hockey East, Kuznetsov was selected in the second round, 50th overall by the Calgary Flames in the 2020 NHL entry draft.

After his sophomore season, Kuznetsov concluded his collegiate career with the Huskies as he was signed by the Flames to a three-year, entry-level contract on 30 March 2021. He joined the Flames' American Hockey League (AHL) affiliate, the Stockton Heat to conclude the season.

Kuznetsov split the 2021–22 season between the Heat and the Saint John Sea Dogs of the Quebec Major Junior Hockey League (QMJHL). The Sea Dogs had previously selected Kuznetsov during the 2021 CHL Import Draft.

He returned to the AHL for the 2022–23 season, skating in 63 games for the Flames' new affiliate, the Calgary Wranglers.

On 5 January 2024, the Flames recalled Kuznetsov. He made his NHL debut on 9 January in a 6-3 win against the Ottawa Senators. Kuznetsov was returned to the Wranglers on 14 January following his lone appearance.

On 12 August 2024, the Flames re-signed Kuznetsov to a one-year, $775,000 contract extension.

== Career statistics ==
=== Regular season and playoffs ===
			Regular season					Playoffs
Season	Team	League	GP	G	A	Pts	PIM	GP	G	A	Pts	PIM
2017–18	CSKA Moscow U18	Russia U18	1	0	0	0	0	—	—	—	—	—
2018–19	Sioux Falls Stampede	USHL	34	0	4	4	12	—	—	—	—	—
2019–20	University of Connecticut	HE	34	2	9	11	16	—	—	—	—	—
2020–21	University of Connecticut	HE	16	1	5	6	4	—	—	—	—	—
2020–21	Stockton Heat	AHL	6	0	0	0	4	—	—	—	—	—
2021–22	Stockton Heat	AHL	12	0	0	0	13	—	—	—	—	—
2021–22	Saint John Sea Dogs	QMJHL	25	2	11	13	14	4	0	2	2	0
2022–23	Calgary Wranglers	AHL	63	5	14	19	30	5	0	2	2	0
2023–24	Calgary Wranglers	AHL	63	5	8	13	27	6	1	0	1	0
2023–24	Calgary Flames	NHL	1	0	0	0	0	—	—	—	—	—
2024–25	Calgary Wranglers	AHL	72	6	15	21	38	2	0	0	0	2
2025–26	Calgary Wranglers	AHL	10	2	0	2	2	—	—	—	—	—
2025–26	Calgary Flames	NHL	57	4	8	12	28	—	—	—	—	—
NHL totals			58	4	8	12	28	—	—	—	—	—

=== International ===
Year	Team	Event	Result	GP	G	A	Pts	PIM
2018	Russia	U17	1st place, gold medalist(s)	6	0	1	1	14
2021	Russia	WJC	4th	7	0	0	0	2
Junior totals				13	0	1	1	16
