= 2021–22 QMJHL season =

- League: Quebec Major Junior Hockey League
- Sport: Hockey
- Duration: Regular season October 1, 2021 – May 1, 2022; Playoffs; May 5, 2022 – June 11, 2022
- Teams: 18
- TV partner(s): Eastlink TV; TVA Sports; MATV

Draft
- Top draft pick: Ethan Gauthier
- Picked by: Sherbrooke Phoenix

Regular season
- Jean Rougeau Trophy: Quebec Remparts (7)
- Season MVP: William Dufour (Saint John Sea Dogs)
- Top scorer: Joshua Roy (Sherbrooke Phoenix)

Playoffs
- Playoffs MVP: Mavrik Bourque (Cataractes)
- Finals champions: Shawinigan Cataractes
- Runners-up: Charlottetown Islanders

QMJHL seasons
- 2020–21 2022–23

2021–22 CHL season
- League: Canadian Hockey League
- Sport: Hockey
- Duration: OHL; October 2021 – June 2022; QMJHL; October 2021 – June 2022; WHL; October 2021 – June 2022
- Teams: 60
- TV partner(s): RDS; TSN; CBC; Rogers TV; Shaw TV
- Season MVP: Logan Stankoven (Kamloops Blazers) (WHL)
- Top scorer: Wyatt Johnston (Windsor Spitfires) (OHL)

Memorial Cup
- Finals champions: Saint John Sea Dogs (QMJHL) (2nd title)
- Runners-up: Hamilton Bulldogs (OHL)

The 2021–22 QMJHL season was the 53rd season of the Quebec Major Junior Hockey League (QMJHL). The league returned to a full 68-game regular season beginning on October 1, 2021, and ending on May 1, 2022.

The playoffs started May 5, 2022 and ended on June 11, 2022, with teams competing for the President's Cup. The winning team, the Shawinigan Cataractes were awarded the President's Cup and participated in the 2022 Memorial Cup, which was hosted by the Saint John Sea Dogs.

== Regular season standings ==
As of May 1, 2022

Note: GP = Games played; W = Wins; L = Losses; OTL = Overtime losses; SL = Shootout losses; GF = Goals for; GA = Goals against; PTS = Points; x = clinched playoff berth; y = clinched division title; z = clinched Jean Rougeau Trophy

=== Eastern Conference ===
| Maritimes Division | GP | W | L | OTL | SL | PTS | GF | GA | Rank |
|---|---|---|---|---|---|---|---|---|---|
| xy-Charlottetown Islanders | 68 | 48 | 13 | 7 | 0 | 103 | 283 | 179 | 2 |
| x-Saint John Sea Dogs | 68 | 47 | 17 | 1 | 3 | 98 | 311 | 201 | 3 |
| x-Acadie–Bathurst Titan | 68 | 40 | 22 | 3 | 3 | 86 | 280 | 211 | 4 |
| x-Halifax Mooseheads | 68 | 38 | 28 | 1 | 1 | 78 | 272 | 272 | 5 |
| x-Moncton Wildcats | 68 | 28 | 31 | 6 | 3 | 65 | 208 | 273 | 7 |
| Cape Breton Eagles | 68 | 14 | 47 | 4 | 3 | 35 | 183 | 335 | 10 |

| East Division | GP | W | L | OTL | SL | PTS | GF | GA | Rank |
|---|---|---|---|---|---|---|---|---|---|
| xyz-Quebec Remparts | 68 | 51 | 15 | 2 | 0 | 104 | 302 | 175 | 1 |
| x-Rimouski Océanic | 68 | 33 | 26 | 5 | 4 | 75 | 228 | 204 | 6 |
| x-Chicoutimi Saguenéens | 68 | 27 | 35 | 1 | 5 | 60 | 206 | 264 | 8 |
| x-Baie-Comeau Drakkar | 68 | 24 | 35 | 4 | 5 | 57 | 201 | 247 | 9 |

=== Western Conference ===
| West Division | GP | W | L | OTL | SL | PTS | GF | GA | Rank |
|---|---|---|---|---|---|---|---|---|---|
| xy-Gatineau Olympiques | 68 | 39 | 15 | 11 | 3 | 92 | 248 | 193 | 2 |
| x-Blainville-Boisbriand Armada | 68 | 30 | 29 | 5 | 4 | 69 | 225 | 259 | 5 |
| x-Rouyn-Noranda Huskies | 68 | 28 | 35 | 1 | 4 | 61 | 190 | 256 | 6 |
| x-Val-d'Or Foreurs | 68 | 26 | 35 | 6 | 1 | 59 | 226 | 298 | 7 |

| Central Division | GP | W | L | OTL | SL | PTS | GF | GA | Rank |
|---|---|---|---|---|---|---|---|---|---|
| xy-Sherbrooke Phoenix | 68 | 46 | 17 | 2 | 3 | 97 | 274 | 202 | 1 |
| x-Shawinigan Cataractes | 68 | 40 | 24 | 1 | 3 | 84 | 235 | 190 | 3 |
| x-Drummondville Voltigeurs | 68 | 28 | 25 | 9 | 6 | 71 | 214 | 252 | 4 |
| Victoriaville Tigres | 68 | 25 | 36 | 4 | 3 | 57 | 176 | 251 | 8 |

== Scoring leaders ==
Note: GP = Games played; G = Goals; A = Assists; Pts = Points; PIM = Penalty minutes
Source: TheQMJHL.ca

| Player | Team | GP | G | A | Pts | PIM |
|---|---|---|---|---|---|---|
| Joshua Roy | Sherbrooke Phoenix | 66 | 51 | 68 | 119 | 22 |
| William Dufour | Saint John Sea Dogs | 66 | 56 | 60 | 116 | 40 |
| Jordan Dumais | Halifax Mooseheads | 68 | 39 | 70 | 109 | 6 |
| Xavier Parent | Sherbrooke Phoenix | 65 | 51 | 55 | 106 | 77 |
| Patrick Guay | Charlottetown Islanders | 68 | 55 | 49 | 104 | 42 |
| Josh Lawrence | Saint John Sea Dogs | 68 | 31 | 70 | 101 | 16 |
| Riley Kidney | Acadie–Bathurst Titan | 66 | 30 | 70 | 100 | 56 |
| Zachary Bolduc | Quebec Remparts | 65 | 55 | 44 | 99 | 36 |
| Théo Rochette | Quebec Remparts | 66 | 33 | 66 | 99 | 28 |
| Simon Pinard | Blainville-Boisbriand/Gatineau | 67 | 44 | 47 | 91 | 34 |

== Leading goaltenders ==
Note: GP = Games played; Mins = Minutes played; W = Wins; L = Losses: OTL = Overtime losses; SL = Shootout losses; GA = Goals Allowed; SO = Shutouts; GAA = Goals against average
Source: TheQMJHL.ca

| Player | Team | GP | Mins | W | L | OTL | SOL | GA | SO | Sv% | GAA |
|---|---|---|---|---|---|---|---|---|---|---|---|
| Charles-Antoine Lavallée | Shawinigan Cataractes | 30 | 1,651:35 | 18 | 8 | 1 | 0 | 66 | 2 | .912 | 2.40 |
| Fabio Iacobo | Quebec Remparts | 38 | 2,205:04 | 28 | 7 | 2 | 0 | 89 | 1 | .895 | 2.42 |
| William Rousseau | Quebec Remparts | 32 | 1,882:14 | 23 | 8 | 0 | 0 | 77 | 3 | .899 | 2.45 |
| Rémi Poirier | Gatineau Olympiques | 37 | 2,156:49 | 22 | 7 | 4 | 2 | 89 | 1 | .907 | 2.48 |
| Thomas Couture | Moncton/Saint John | 40 | 2,208:51 | 29 | 6 | 2 | 1 | 93 | 2 | .915 | 2.53 |

== 2022 President's Cup playoffs ==
In the first two rounds seeding is determined by conference standings, and in the two final rounds seeding is determined by overall standings.

Conference quarter-finals
W1 | Sherbrooke | 3
W8 | Baie-Comeau | 1
W2 | Gatineau | 3
W7 | Val-d'Or | 1
W3 | Shawinigan | 3
W6 | Rouyn-Noranda | 0
W4 | Drummondville | 1
W5 | Blainville-Boisbriand | 3
E1 | Quebec | 3
E8 | Chicoutimi | 0
E2 | Charlottetown | 3
E7 | Moncton | 0
E3 | Saint John | 2
E6 | Rimouski | 3
E4 | Acadie–Bathurst | 3
E5 | Halifax | 2

Conference semi-finals
W1 | Sherbrooke | 3
W5 | Blainville-Boisbriand | 0
W2 | Gatineau | 0
W3 | Shawinigan | 3
E1 | Quebec | 3
E6 | Rimouski | 1
E2 | Charlottetown | 3
E4 | Acadie–Bathurst | 0

Semi-finals
1 | Quebec | 2
7 | Shawinigan | 3
2 | Charlottetown | 3
4 | Sherbrooke | 1

President's Cup Championship
2 | Charlottetown | 1
7 | Shawinigan | 4

== Conference quarter-finals ==
=== Western Conference quarter-finals ===
==== (1) Sherbrooke Phoenix vs. (8) Baie-Comeau Drakkar ====
| May 5 | Baie-Comeau Drakkar | 0 – 7 | Sherbrooke Phoenix | Palais des Sports Léopold-Drolet | Recap |

| May 6 | Baie-Comeau Drakkar | 1 – 4 | Sherbrooke Phoenix | Palais des Sports Léopold-Drolet | Recap |

| May 9 | Sherbrooke Phoenix | 4 – 5 | OT | Baie-Comeau Drakkar | Centre Henry-Leonard | Recap |

| May 10 | Sherbrooke Phoenix | 3 – 2 | Baie-Comeau Drakkar | Centre Henry-Leonard | Recap |

| Sherbrooke wins series 3 – 1 |

==== (2) Gatineau Olympiques vs. (7) Val d'Or Foreurs ====
| May 5 | Val d'Or Foreurs | 2 – 1 | OT | Gatineau Olympiques | Centre Slush Puppie | Recap |

| May 6 | Val d'Or Foreurs | 1 – 5 | Gatineau Olympiques | Centre Slush Puppie | Recap |

| May 9 | Gatineau Olympiques | 8 – 5 | Val d'Or Foreurs | Centre Agnico Eagle | Recap |

| May 10 | Gatineau Olympiques | 5 – 2 | Val d'Or Foreurs | Centre Agnico Eagle | Recap |

| Gatineau wins series 3 – 1 |

==== (3) Shawinigan Cataractes vs. (6) Rouyn-Noranda Huskies ====
| May 5 | Rouyn-Noranda Huskies | 1 – 6 | Shawinigan Cataractes | Centre Gervais Auto | Recap |
| No scoring | | First period | 2:49 - Lou-Félix Denis (1); 10:54 - Xavier Bourgault (1); 11:36 - pp - Xavier Bourgault (2); 18:26 - Jordan Tourigny (1) |
| No scoring | | Second period | No scoring |
| Alex Arsenault (1) - 19:44 | | Third period | 9:03 - Xavier Bourgault (3); 14:49 - pp - Pierrick Dubé (1) |
| Samuel Richard (23 saves / 29 shots) | | Goalie stats | Antoine Coulombe (19 saves / 20 shots) |

| May 6 | Rouyn-Noranda Huskies | 1 – 2 | Shawinigan Cataractes | Centre Gervais Auto | Recap |

| May 9 | Shawinigan Cataractes | 3 – 2 | OT | Rouyn-Noranda Huskies | Aréna Glencore | Recap |

| Shawinigan wins series 3 – 0 |

==== (4) Drummondville Voltigeurs vs. (5) Blainville-Boisbriand Armada ====
| May 5 | Blainville-Boisbriand Armada | 1 – 2 | Drummondville Voltigeurs | Centre Marcel Dionne | Recap |

| May 6 | Blainville-Boisbriand Armada | 4 – 1 | Drummondville Voltigeurs | Centre Marcel Dionne | Recap |

| May 9 | Drummondville Voltigeurs | 1 – 5 | Blainville-Boisbriand Armada | Centre d'Excellence Sports Rousseau | Recap |

| May 10 | Drummondville Voltigeurs | 2 – 4 | Blainville-Boisbriand Armada | Centre d'Excellence Sports Rousseau | Recap |

| Blainville-Boisbriand wins series 3 – 1 |

=== Eastern Conference quarter-finals ===
==== (1) Quebec Remparts vs. (8) Chicoutimi Saguenéens ====
| May 5 | Chicoutimi Saguenéens | 1 – 6 | Quebec Remparts | Videotron Centre | Recap |

| May 7 | Chicoutimi Saguenéens | 3 – 6 | Quebec Remparts | Videotron Centre | Recap |

| May 9 | Quebec Remparts | 6 – 3 | Chicoutimi Saguenéens | Centre Georges-Vézina | Recap |

| Quebec wins series 3 – 0 |

==== (2) Charlottetown Islanders vs. (7) Moncton Wildcats ====
| May 5 | Moncton Wildcats | 2 – 7 | Charlottetown Islanders | Eastlink Centre | Recap |

| May 6 | Moncton Wildcats | 2 – 4 | Charlottetown Islanders | Eastlink Centre | Recap |

| May 9 | Charlottetown Islanders | 5 – 0 | Moncton Wildcats | Avenir Centre | Recap |

| Charlottetown wins series 3 – 0 |

==== (3) Saint John Sea Dogs vs. (6) Rimouski Océanic ====
| May 5 | Rimouski Océanic | 3 – 1 | Saint John Sea Dogs | TD Station | Recap |

| May 6 | Rimouski Océanic | 2 – 4 | Saint John Sea Dogs | TD Station | Recap |

| May 9 | Saint John Sea Dogs | 5 – 2 | Rimouski Océanic | Colisée Financière Sun Life | Recap |

| May 10 | Saint John Sea Dogs | 0 – 1 | Rimouski Océanic | Colisée Financière Sun Life | Recap |

| May 12 | Rimouski Océanic | 4 – 3 | OT | Saint John Sea Dogs | TD Station | Recap |

| Rimouski wins series 3 – 2 |

==== (4) Acadie–Bathurst Titan vs. (5) Halifax Mooseheads ====
| May 5 | Halifax Mooseheads | 6 – 3 | Acadie–Bathurst Titan | K.C. Irving Regional Centre | Recap |

| May 6 | Halifax Mooseheads | 6 – 5 | Acadie–Bathurst Titan | K.C. Irving Regional Centre | Recap |

| May 9 | Acadie–Bathurst Titan | 8 – 1 | Halifax Mooseheads | Scotiabank Centre | Recap |

| May 11 | Acadie–Bathurst Titan | 4 – 3 | 3OT | Halifax Mooseheads | Scotiabank Centre | Recap |

| May 13 | Halifax Mooseheads | 1 – 2 | Acadie–Bathurst Titan | K.C. Irving Regional Centre | Recap |

| Acadie–Bathurst wins series 3 – 2 |

== Conference semi-finals ==
=== Western Conference semi-finals ===
==== (1) Sherbrooke Phoenix vs. (5) Blainville-Boisbriand Armada ====
| May 15 | Blainville-Boisbriand Armada | 1 – 3 | Sherbrooke Phoenix | Palais des Sports Léopold-Drolet | Recap |

| May 16 | Blainville-Boisbriand Armada | 1 – 4 | Sherbrooke Phoenix | Palais des Sports Léopold-Drolet | Recap |

| May 19 | Sherbrooke Phoenix | 7 – 5 | Blainville-Boisbriand Armada | Centre d'Excellence Sports Rousseau | Recap |

| Sherbrooke wins series 3 – 0 |

==== (2) Gatineau Olympiques vs. (3) Shawinigan Cataractes ====
| May 15 | Shawinigan Cataractes | 6 – 5 | OT | Gatineau Olympiques | Centre Slush Puppie | Recap |

| May 16 | Shawinigan Cataractes | 3 – 1 | Gatineau Olympiques | Centre Slush Puppie | Recap |

| May 19 | Gatineau Olympiques | 0 – 1 | Shawinigan Cataractes | Centre Gervais Auto | Recap |

| Shawinigan wins series 3 – 0 |

=== Eastern Conference semi-finals ===
==== (1) Quebec Remparts vs. (6) Rimouski Océanic ====
| May 15 | Rimouski Océanic | 0 – 4 | Quebec Remparts | Videotron Centre | Recap |

| May 16 | Rimouski Océanic | 4 – 1 | Quebec Remparts | Videotron Centre | Recap |

| May 19 | Quebec Remparts | 4 – 1 | Rimouski Océanic | Colisée Financière Sun Life | Recap |

| May 20 | Quebec Remparts | 5 – 2 | Rimouski Océanic | Colisée Financière Sun Life | Recap |

| Quebec wins series 3 – 1 |

==== (2) Charlottetown Islanders vs. (4) Acadie–Bathurst Titan ====
| May 15 | Acadie–Bathurst Titan | 1 – 4 | Charlottetown Islanders | Eastlink Centre | Recap |

| May 16 | Acadie–Bathurst Titan | 1 – 5 | Charlottetown Islanders | Eastlink Centre | Recap |

| May 19 | Charlottetown Islanders | 3 – 1 | Acadie–Bathurst Titan | K.C. Irving Regional Centre | Recap |

| Charlottetown wins series 3 – 0 |

== President's Cup Semifinals ==
=== (1) Quebec Remparts vs. (7) Shawinigan Cataractes ===
| May 25 | Shawinigan Cataractes | 2 – 3 | Quebec Remparts | Videotron Centre | Recap |

| May 26 | Shawinigan Cataractes | 1 – 0 | OT | Quebec Remparts | Videotron Centre | Recap |

| May 29 | Quebec Remparts | 3 – 2 | Shawinigan Cataractes | Centre Gervais Auto | Recap |

| May 30 | Quebec Remparts | 2 – 3 | OT | Shawinigan Cataractes | Centre Gervais Auto | Recap |

| June 1 | Shawinigan Cataractes | 5 – 3 | Quebec Remparts | Videotron Centre | Recap |

| Shawinigan wins series 3 – 2 |

=== (2) Charlottetown Islanders vs. (4) Sherbrooke Phoenix ===
| May 25 | Sherbrooke Phoenix | 2 – 7 | Charlottetown Islanders | Eastlink Centre | Recap |

| May 26 | Sherbrooke Phoenix | 4 – 3 | OT | Charlottetown Islanders | Eastlink Centre | Recap |

| May 29 | Charlottetown Islanders | 3 – 2 | Sherbrooke Phoenix | Palais des Sports Léopold-Drolet | Recap |

| May 30 | Charlottetown Islanders | 4 – 3 | Sherbrooke Phoenix | Palais des Sports Léopold-Drolet | Recap |

| Charlottetown wins series 3 – 1 |

== President's Cup Finals ==
=== (2) Charlottetown Islanders vs. (7) Shawinigan Cataractes ===
| June 4 | Shawinigan Cataractes | 5 – 1 | Charlottetown Islanders | Eastlink Centre | Recap |

| June 5 | Shawinigan Cataractes | 4 – 3 | OT | Charlottetown Islanders | Eastlink Centre | Recap |

| June 8 | Charlottetown Islanders | 4 – 5 | OT | Shawinigan Cataractes | Centre Gervais Auto | Recap |

| June 9 | Charlottetown Islanders | 7 – 0 | Shawinigan Cataractes | Centre Gervais Auto | Recap |

| June 11 | Shawinigan Cataractes | 4 – 3 | OT | Charlottetown Islanders | Eastlink Centre | Recap |

| Shawinigan wins series 4 – 1 |

== Playoff leading scorers ==
Note: GP = Games played; G = Goals; A = Assists; Pts = Points; PIM = Penalties minutes

| Player | Team | GP | G | A | Pts | PIM |
|---|---|---|---|---|---|---|
| Patrick Guay | Charlottetown Islanders | 15 | 13 | 15 | 28 | 8 |
| Mavrik Bourque | Shawinigan Cataractes | 16 | 9 | 16 | 25 | 8 |
| Joshua Roy | Sherbrooke Phoenix | 11 | 8 | 15 | 23 | 0 |
| Xavier Bourgault | Shawinigan Cataractes | 16 | 12 | 10 | 22 | 10 |
| Xavier Parent | Sherbrooke Phoenix | 11 | 9 | 13 | 22 | 12 |
| Lucas Cormier | Charlottetown Islanders | 15 | 8 | 13 | 21 | 14 |
| Xavier Simoneau | Charlottetown Islanders | 14 | 4 | 17 | 21 | 17 |
| Brett Budgell | Charlottetown Islanders | 15 | 12 | 8 | 20 | 30 |
| Jakub Brabenec | Charlottetown Islanders | 15 | 5 | 14 | 19 | 14 |
| Pierrick Dubé | Shawinigan Cataractes | 16 | 12 | 6 | 18 | 22 |

== Playoff leading goaltenders ==
Note: GP = Games played; Mins = Minutes played; W = Wins; L = Losses: OTL = Overtime losses; SL = Shootout losses; GA = Goals Allowed; SO = Shutouts; GAA = Goals against average

| Player | Team | GP | Mins | W | L | GA | SO | Sv% | GAA |
|---|---|---|---|---|---|---|---|---|---|
| Fabio Iacobo | Quebec Remparts | 4 | 239:27 | 3 | 1 | 7 | 1 | .889 | 1.75 |
| Charles-Antoine Lavallée | Shawinigan Cataractes | 5 | 249:22 | 4 | 0 | 8 | 0 | .927 | 1.92 |
| William Rousseau | Quebec Remparts | 8 | 499:14 | 5 | 3 | 18 | 0 | .922 | 2.16 |
| Thomas Couture | Saint John Sea Dogs | 5 | 244:53 | 2 | 2 | 9 | 0 | .901 | 2.21 |
| Francesco Lapenna | Charlottetown Islanders | 15 | 908:22 | 10 | 5 | 36 | 2 | .908 | 2.38 |

== Trophies and awards ==
2021–22 QMJHL Awards
| Award | Recipient(s) | Runner(s)-up/Finalists | Source |
|---|---|---|---|
| President's Cup; Playoff champions | Shawinigan Cataractes | Charlottetown Islanders | |
| Jean Rougeau Trophy; Regular season champions | Quebec Remparts | Charlottetown Islanders | |
| Luc Robitaille Trophy; Team with the best goals for average | Saint John Sea Dogs | Charlottetown Islanders | |
| Robert Lebel Trophy; Team with the best goals against average | Quebec Remparts | Charlottetown Islanders | |
| Michel Brière Memorial Trophy; Regular season MVP | William Dufour, Saint John Sea Dogs | Lukas Cormier, Charlottetown Islanders; Joshua Roy, Sherbrooke Phoenix | |
| Jean Béliveau Trophy; Top Scorer | Joshua Roy, Sherbrooke Phoenix | William Dufour, Saint John Sea Dogs | |
| Guy Lafleur Trophy; Playoff MVP | Mavrik Bourque, Shawinigan Cataractes | | |
| Jacques Plante Memorial Trophy; Goaltender of the Year | Charles-Antoine Lavallée, Shawinigan Cataractes | Fabio Iacobo, Quebec Remparts | |
| Guy Carbonneau Trophy; Best Defensive Forward | Jacob Gaucher, Baie-Comeau Drakkar | Elliot Desnoyers, Halifax Mooseheads; Nathan Gaucher, Quebec Remparts | |
| Emile Bouchard Trophy; Defenceman of the Year | Lukas Cormier, Charlottetown Islanders | Miguël Tourigny, Blainville-Boisbriand Armada/Acadie-Bathurst Titan; William Villeneuve, Saint John Sea Dogs | |
| Kevin Lowe Trophy; Best Defensive Defenceman | Noah Laaouan, Charlottetown Islanders | Simon Lavigne, Blainville-Boisbriand Armada; Vincent Sévigny, Victoriaville Tigres/Saint John Sea Dogs | |
| Michael Bossy Trophy; Top Prospect | Nathan Gaucher, Quebec Remparts | Maveric Lamoureux, Drummondville Voltigeurs; Tristan Luneau, Gatineau Olympiques | |
| RDS Cup; Rookie of the Year | Jakub Brabenec, Charlottetown Islanders | David Spacek, Sherbrooke Phoenix | |
| Michel Bergeron Trophy; Offensive Rookie of the Year | Jakub Brabenec, Charlottetown Islanders | Maxim Barbashev, Moncton Wildcats; Mathieu Cataford, Halifax Mooseheads | |
| Raymond Lagacé Trophy; Defensive Rookie of the Year | David Spacek, Sherbrooke Phoenix | Nathan Darveau, Victoriaville Tigres; Niks Fenenko, Baie-Comeau Drakkar | |
| Frank J. Selke Memorial Trophy; Most Sportsmanlike Player | Jordan Dumais, Halifax Mooseheads | Justin Robidas, Val-d'Or Foreurs; Joshua Roy, Sherbrooke Phoenix | |
| QMJHL Humanitarian of the Year; Humanitarian of the Year | Brett Budgell, Charlottetown Islanders | Nicholas Blagden, Saint John Sea Dogs; Xavier Parent, Sherbrooke Phoenix | |
| Marcel Robert Trophy; Best Scholastic Player | Charlie Truchon, Quebec Remparts | Lukas Cormier, Charlottetown Islanders; Jacob Gaucher, Baie-Comeau Drakkar | |
| Paul Dumont Trophy; Personality of the Year | Joshua Roy, Sherbrooke Phoenix | Ève Gascon, Gatineau Olympiques; Nathan Gaucher, Quebec Remparts | |
| Ron Lapointe Trophy; Coach of the Year | Jim Hulton, Charlottetown Islanders | Stéphane Julien, Sherbrooke Phoenix; Patrick Roy, Quebec Remparts | |
| Maurice Filion Trophy; General Manager of the Year | Patrick Roy, Quebec Remparts | Jim Hulton, Charlottetown Islanders; Stéphane Julien, Sherbrooke Phoenix | |

=== All-Star teams ===
First All-Star Team:

- Samuel Richard, Goaltender, Rouyn-Noranda Huskies
- Lukas Cormier, Defenceman, Charlottetown Islanders
- Miguël Tourigny, Defenceman, Acadie–Bathurst Titan
- William Dufour, Forward, Saint John Sea Dogs
- Patrick Guay, Forward, Charlottetown Islanders
- Joshua Roy, Forward, Sherbrooke Phoenix

Second All-Star Team

- Jan Bednář, Goaltender, Acadie–Bathurst Titan
- Vincent Sévigny, Defenceman, Saint John Sea Dogs
- William Villeneuve, Defenceman, Saint John Sea Dogs
- Zachary Bolduc, Forward, Quebec Remparts
- Jordan Dumais, Forward, Halifax Mooseheads
- Xavier Parent, Forward, Sherbrooke Phoenix

All-Rookie Team:

- Nathan Darveau, Goaltender, Victoriaville Tigres
- Niks Fenenko, Defenceman, Baie-Comeau Drakkar
- David Spacek, Defenceman, Sherbrooke Phoenix
- Maxim Barbashev, Forward, Moncton Wildcats
- Jakub Brabenec, Forward, Charlottetown Islanders
- Mathieu Cataford, Forward, Halifax Mooseheads

== See also ==
- List of QMJHL seasons
- 2021–22 OHL season
- 2021–22 WHL season

| Preceded by 2020–21 QMJHL season | QMJHL seasons | Succeeded by 2022–23 QMJHL season |
