= Mavrik Bourque =

Canadian ice hockey player (born 2002)

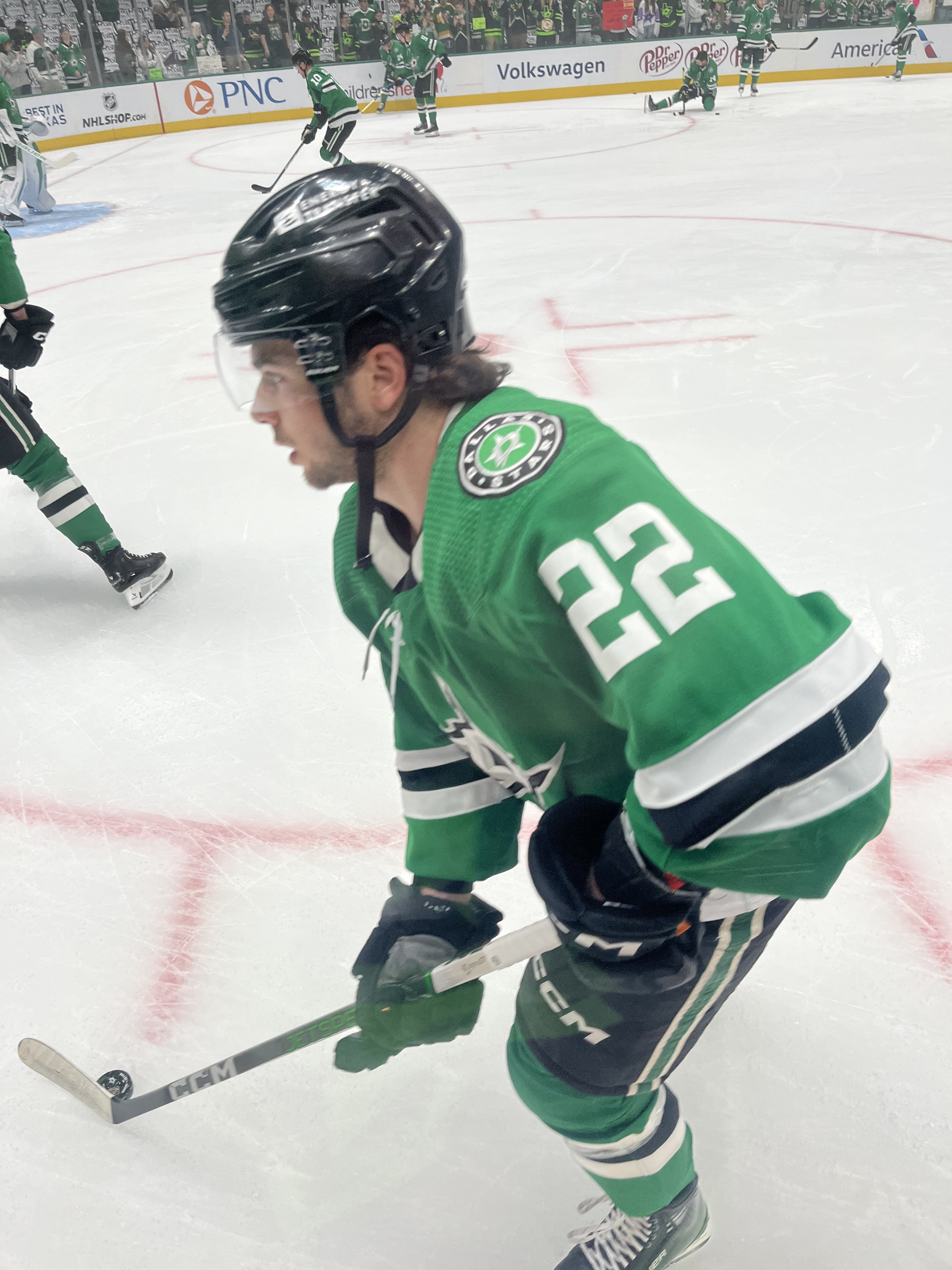
- Bourque with the Dallas Stars in May 2024
- Born: January 8, 2002 (age 24) Plessisville, Quebec, Canada
- Height: 5 ft 11 in (180 cm)
- Weight: 187 lb (85 kg; 13 st 5 lb)
- Position: Centre
- Shoots: Right
- NHL team Former teams: Nashville Predators; Dallas Stars
- NHL draft: 30th overall, 2020; Dallas Stars
- Playing career: 2021–present

Mavrik Bourque (born January 8, 2002) is a Canadian professional ice hockey player who is a centre for the Nashville Predators of the National Hockey League (NHL). He was selected in the first round, 30th overall, by the Stars in the 2020 NHL entry draft.

== Playing career ==
Bourque played major junior ice hockey with the Shawinigan Cataractes of the Quebec Major Junior Hockey League (QMJHL). He was drafted 30th overall by the Dallas Stars in the 2020 NHL entry draft. On March 1, 2021, Bourque was signed to a three-year, entry-level contract by the Stars.

Bourque made his NHL debut on April 6, 2024, in a 3–2 loss to the Chicago Blackhawks, and was then returned to Dallas' American Hockey League (AHL) affiliate, the Texas Stars, the following day. In the 2023–24 AHL season, Bourque won the Les Cunningham Award and John B. Sollenberger Trophy as the AHL's "Most Valuable Player" and top scorer. Bourque recorded his first career hat trick on April 13, 2026, as part of a 6–5 victory over the Toronto Maple Leafs.

As a restricted free agent, Bourque was traded by the Stars along with Ilya Lyubushkin to the Nashville Predators on July 1, 2026, in exchange for a 2027 2nd round pick and a 2028 3rd round pick. He was later signed to a six-year, $33 million contract extension with the Predators on July 4.

== Career statistics ==
=== Regular season and playoffs ===
Bold indicates led league

			Regular season					Playoffs
Season	Team	League	GP	G	A	Pts	PIM	GP	G	A	Pts	PIM
2017–18	Trois-Rivières Estacades	QMAAA	40	22	24	46	6	14	8	13	21	12
2018–19	Shawinigan Cataractes	QMJHL	64	25	29	54	30	6	2	3	5	2
2019–20	Shawinigan Cataractes	QMJHL	49	29	42	71	30	—	—	—	—	—
2020–21	Shawinigan Cataractes	QMJHL	28	19	24	43	36	5	4	2	6	6
2020–21	Texas Stars	AHL	6	1	4	5	0	—	—	—	—	—
2021–22	Shawinigan Cataractes	QMJHL	31	20	48	68	30	16	9	16	25	8
2022–23	Texas Stars	AHL	70	20	27	47	18	8	1	3	4	4
2023–24	Texas Stars	AHL	71	26	51	**77**	32	7	3	8	11	6
2023–24	Dallas Stars	NHL	1	0	0	0	0	1	0	0	0	0
2024–25	Dallas Stars	NHL	73	11	14	25	8	3	0	0	0	2
2025–26	Dallas Stars	NHL	82	20	21	41	22	6	1	0	1	4
NHL totals			156	31	35	66	30	10	1	0	1	6

=== International ===
Year	Team	Event	Result	GP	G	A	Pts	PIM
2018	Canada White	U17	6th	5	0	3	3	0
2019	Canada	HG18	2nd place, silver medalist(s)	5	0	1	1	0
Junior totals				10	0	4	4	0

Awards and achievements
Preceded by Thomas Harley	Dallas Stars first-round draft pick 2020	Succeeded by Wyatt Johnston
