= List of 2019 Canada Winter Games medallists =

The 2019 Canada Winter Games were held in Red Deer, Alberta from 15 February to 3 March 2019. The following is a list of medallists from the games.

== Alpine skiing ==
Men

Event	Gold		Silver		Bronze	
Super-G	Alexis Barabe; Quebec	45.27	Aleksas Valadka; Ontario	45.60	Kyle Blandford; Ontario	46.07
Giant slalom	Mathis Lafond; Quebec	1:47.58	Hugo Culver; Quebec	1:47.76	Aleksas Valadka; Ontario	1:48.66
Slalom	Heming Sola; British Columbia	1:39.58	Ryley Fergusson; Alberta	1:40.04	Aleksas Valadka; Ontario	1:40.05
Ski cross	Shane Sommer; Nova Scotia		Alexis Barabe; Quebec		Heming Sola; British Columbia	
Para giant slalom	Spencer Allen; Alberta	2:00.66	Brian Rowland; Ontario	2:12.16	Ben Harris; Ontario	2:13.45
Para slalom	Ethan Gillese; Alberta	2:09.06	Logan Leach; British Columbia	2:09.75	Ben Harris; Ontario	2:25.17

Women

Event	Gold		Silver		Bronze	
Super-G	Arianne Forget; Quebec	45.90	Makenna Lebsack; Alberta	46.43	Britt Richardson; Alberta	46.72
Giant slalom	Arianne Forget; Quebec	1:44.27	Britt Richardson; Alberta	1:44.70	Makenna Lebsack; Alberta	1:45.60
Slalom	Marie-Pier Brunet; Quebec	1:34.51	Cydnie Timmermann; Alberta	1:35.48	Laura Beauvais; Quebec	1:35.98
Ski cross	Marie-Pier Brunet; Quebec		Kaitlyn Fynn; Alberta		Britt Richardson; Alberta	
Para giant slalom	Tess Beasant; Alberta	2:24.42	Brenda MacDonald; Nova Scotia	2:27.58	Hanna Chilson; Alberta	2:29.65
Para slalom	Hanna Chilson; Quebec	2:44.76	Rebecca Mideros; Ontario	2:48.05	Abbey Van Duzer; Ontario	2:57.58

== Archery ==
Recurve

Event	Gold	Silver	Bronze
Men's individual	Hunter Chipley; Saskatchewan	Aaron Cox; Alberta	Adam Deane; British Columbia
Women's individual	Marie-Ève Gélinas; Quebec	Adi Shapira; British Columbia	Ryli Vallière; Ontario
Mixed team	Jacob Gagnon; Marie-Ève Gélinas; Quebec	Hunter Chipley; Jay Gegner; Saskatchewan	Reece Wilson-Poyton; Ryli Vallière; Ontario

Compound

Event	Gold	Silver	Bronze
Men's individual	Austin Taylor; Manitoba	Spencer Gamache; British Columbia	Jacob Bourassa; Saskatchewan
Women's individual	Marie Paquette; Quebec	Kristen Arsenault; Prince Edward Island	Abbigail Bunn; Ontario
Mixed team	Matthew Turcotte; Marie Paquette; Quebec	Austin Taylor; Bryanne Lameg; Manitoba	Jacob Bourassa; J'Lynn Mitchell; Saskatchewan

== Artistic swimming ==
Event	Gold		Silver		Bronze	
Solo	Jaime Czarkowski; Alberta	158.0165	Mikaëlle Gauthier; Quebec	157.5852	Emma Spott; Ontario	152.4320
Duet	Alberta; Jaime Czarkowski; Teah Hoffmann	157.0731	Quebec; Mikaëlle Gauthier; Audrey Veilleux	155.8312	Ontario; Emma Spott; Maddie Whitten	153.4795
Team	Alberta	159.0363	Quebec	156.7019	Ontario	154.6499

== Badminton ==
Event	Gold	Silver	Bronze
Men's singles	Antonio Li; British Columbia	Kevin Lee; Alberta	Imran Wadia; Alberta
Women's singles	Wendy Zhang; British Columbia	Talia Ng; Ontario	Jacqueline Cheung; Ontario
Men's doubles	Alberta; Austin Bauer; Kevin Lee	Ontario; Stanley Feng; Jonathan Lai	Quebec; Mathieu Morneau; Nicolas Nguyen
Women's doubles	British Columbia; Kylie Cheng; Wendy Zhang	Quebec; Camille Leblanc; Alyson Ruan	Ontario; Catherine Choi; Crystal Lai
Mixed doubles	Alberta; Austin Bauer; Kyleigh O'Donoghue	Alberta; Imran Wadia; Takeisha Wang	Quebec; Nicolas Nguyen; Alexandra Mocanu
Mixed team	Alberta; Austin Bauer; Emily Chan; Yunzhi Chen; Stephanie Cheung; Eyota Kwan; Kevin Lee; Kyleigh O'Donoghue; Imran Wadia; Desmond Wang; Takeisha Wang	Quebec; Andrew Choi; Béatrice Guay; Xavier Laperriere; Camille Leblanc; Alexandra Mocanu; Mathieu Morneau; Anthony Nguyen; Nicolas Nguyen; Alyson Ruan; Eliana Zhang	Ontario; Rachel Chan; Jacqueline Cheung; Catherine Choi; Darren Choi; Stanley Feng; Colin Jia; Crystal Lai; Jonathan Lai; Victor Lai; Talia Ng

== Biathlon ==
Men

Event	Gold		Silver		Bronze	
Sprint	Leo Grandbois; Quebec	23:47.8	Reid Lovstrom; Alberta	24:10.3	Andrei Secu; British Columbia	24:20.0
Individual	Logan Pletz; Saskatchewan	37:46.9	Leo Grandbois; Quebec	37:57.8	Haldan Borglum; Alberta	39:12.6
Pursuit	Ryan Elden; British Columbia	26:54.4	Leo Grandbois; Quebec	28:07.0	Andrei Secu; British Columbia	28:59.6
Relay	Quebec; Zachary Demers; Leo Grandbois; Frédéric Hamel; Oliver Holder	1:04:44.4	Alberta; Chad Berling; Haldan Borglum; Thomas Hulsman; Reid Lovstrom	1:05:57.1	British Columbia; Ethan Algra; Ryan Elden; Keiran Marchand; Andrei Secu	1:08:02.4

Women

Event	Gold		Silver		Bronze	
Sprint	Jenna Sherrington; Alberta	21:06.8	Pascale Paradis; Alberta	21:31.7	Naomi Walch; Alberta	22:53.3
Individual	Jenna Sherrington; Alberta	32:48.0	Pascale Paradis; Alberta	32:58.2	Karly Coyne; Alberta	35:16.4
Pursuit	Larissa Black; British Columbia	25:27.4	Gillian Gowling; British Columbia	25:28.8	Pascale Paradis; Alberta	26:21.1
Relay	Alberta; Karly Coyne; Pascale Paradis; Jenna Sherrington; Naomi Walch	55:59.1	Quebec; Adrianna Emond; Pauline Grandbois; Frédérique Pérusse; Piaper Veinotte	1:00:21.8	British Columbia; Danica Ariano; Natalie Benoit; Larissa Black; Gillian Gowling	1:00:56.1

== Boxing ==
Men

Event	Gold	Silver	Bronze
56 kg	Avery Duval; Quebec	Cole Brander; Alberta	Jawad Miakhail; Manitoba
60 kg	Brayden Sims; British Columbia	Justice Harborne; Manitoba	Lucas Craston; Ontario
64 kg	Sammy Morisset; Quebec	Alex Bulgaru; Nova Scotia	Mason Galvao; Ontario
69 kg	Christopher Guerrero Zuri; Quebec	Kyle Leon; Ontario	Matthew Ross; Nova Scotia
75 kg	Moe Zawadi; Ontario	Janick Lacroix; Alberta	Jonathan Hannah; British Columbia
81 kg	Isaiah Haya; New Brunswick	Tiago Balteiro; Ontario	Brayden Markin-Hellekson; British Columbia

== Cross-country skiing ==
Men

Event	Gold		Silver		Bronze	
Sprint	Graham Ritchie; Ontario	2:27.27	Pierre Grall-Johnson; Ontario	2:28.56	Conor McGovern; Manitoba	2:30.39
10 km interval start	Rémi Drolet; British Columbia	22:05.10	Reed Godfrey; Alberta	22:57.40	Graham Ritchie; Ontario	22:58.20
15 km mass start	Rémi Drolet; British Columbia	40:57.30	Antoine Cyr; Quebec	41:14.50	Samuel Hendry; Alberta	41:58.20
Sprint sitting para	Ethan Hess; British Columbia	2:38.50	Leo Sammarelli; British Columbia	2:50.70	Paul Finkbeiner; British Columbia	3:16.00
2.5 km sitting para	Ethan Hess; British Columbia	9:43.00	Leo Sammarelli; British Columbia	12:33.20	Paul Finkbeiner; British Columbia	13:44.50
5 km sitting para	Ethan Hess; British Columbia	9:43.00	Leo Sammarelli; British Columbia	12:33.20	Paul Finkbeiner; British Columbia	13:44.50
Sprint sitting para	Andy Lin; British Columbia	4:21.10	Kyle Barber; Ontario	4:30.40	Jesse Bachinsky; Manitoba	4:33.60
2.5 km standing para	Jesse Bachinsky; Manitoba	7:28.30	Kyle Barber; Ontario	7:33.20	Jesse Ehman; Saskatchewan	8:20.10
5 km standing para	Andy Lin; British Columbia	15:45.70	Kyle Barber; Ontario	16:24.80	Jesse Bachinsky; Manitoba	17:13.30

Women

Event	Gold		Silver		Bronze	
Sprint	Shaylynn Loewen; Ontario	2:53.80	Benita Peiffer; British Columbia	2:54.10	Laura Leclair; Quebec	3:00.05
7.5 km interval start	Laura Leclair; Quebec	22:11.60	Benita Peiffer; British Columbia	22:40.50	Issy Hendry; Alberta	22:42.30
10 km mass start	Jasmine Drolet; British Columbia	29:31.70	Laura Leclair; Ontario	29:48.50	Natalie Hynes; Yukon	29:59.30
2.5 km sitting para	Alexis Barabe; Quebec	45.27	Aleksas Valadka; Ontario	45.60	Kyle Blandford; Ontario	46.07
5 km sitting para	Alexis Barabe; Quebec	45.27	Aleksas Valadka; Ontario	45.60	Kyle Blandford; Ontario	46.07
Sprint sitting para	Lyne Bilodeau; Quebec	3:23.20	Tanya Quesnel; Ontario	3:49.50	Kryztle Shewchuk; British Columbia	4:16.00
2.5 km standing para	Lyne Bilodeau; Quebec	13:48.60	Tanya Quesnel; Ontario	17:18.10	Kryztle Shewchuk; British Columbia	19:37.90
5 km standing para	Lyne Bilodeau; Quebec	21:04.50	Tanya Quesnel; Ontario	24:20.90	Kryztle Shewchuk; British Columbia	27:46.90
Sprint standing para	Cindy Morin; Quebec	5:44.10	Céline Kavanaugh; New Brunswick	6:09.10	Maya Jonas; British Columbia	7:06.50

Mixed

Event	Gold		Silver		Bronze	
Relay	British Columbia	1:05:46.90	Quebec	1:06:48.70	Alberta	1:06:51.30

== Curling ==
Games	Gold	Silver	Bronze
Men	British Columbia; Hayato Sato; Joshua Miki; Dawson Ballard; Troy Chong	Ontario; Daniel Del Conte; Nyk Moore; Samuel Guilbeault; Vincent Barbon	Manitoba; Graham Loewen; Sean Flatt; Zack Bilawka; Adam Flatt
Women	Ontario; Bella Croisier; Jamie Smith; Piper Croisier; Lauren Rajala	Manitoba; Hayley Bergman; Anastasia Ginters; Payton Bergman; Cheyenne Ehnes	Nova Scotia; Cally Moore; Taylour Stevens; Cassidy Currie; Cate Fitzgerald

== Figure skating ==
Event	Gold	Silver	Bronze
Pre-Novice Women's singles	Michelle Deng	Sara-Maude Depuis	Audrey Carle
Pre-Novice Men's singles	John Kim	Brendan Wong	David Li
Pre-Novice Ice Dance	Hailey Yu / Brendan Giang	Grace Pelé / Joel Portz	Savanna Martel / Kobi Chant
Pre-Novice Pairs	Lily Wilberforce / Aidan Wright	Charlotte Giraldeau / Eliott Goulet	Ashlyn Schmitz / Tristan Taylor
Novice Women's singles	Kaiya Ruiter	Gabriella Guo	Mélaurie Boivin
Novice Men's singles	Matthew Newnham	Wesley Chiu	Rio Morita
Novice Ice dance	Kiera Kam / Mathew Carter	Sydney Embro / Eric Millar	Isabel McQuilkin / Jake Portz
Novice Pairs	Jamie Fournier / Gabriel Farand	Caidence Derenisky / Raine Eberl	Mackenzie Ripley / Owen Brawley

== Freestyle skiing ==
Men

Event	Gold		Silver		Bronze	
Aerials	Brayden Kuroda; British Columbia	121.65	Alex Mysko; Ontario	119.57	Olivier Lessard; Quebec	119.29
Big air	Édouard Therriault; Quebec	92.00	Jake Sandstrom; Alberta	87.60	Jesse Gross; Ontario	86.20
Halfpipe	Xander Cayer; Alberta	78.00	Édouard Therriault; Quebec	74.60	Bruce Oldham; Ontario	71.80
Moguls	Brayden Kuroda; British Columbia	86.81	Olivier Lessard; Quebec	83.76	Jean-Christophe Nadeau; Quebec	83.13
Slopestyle	Édouard Therriault; Quebec	88.00	Jake Sandstrom; Alberta	85.20	Jesse Gross; Ontario	82.80

Women

Event	Gold		Silver		Bronze	
Aerials	Flavie Aumond; Quebec	121.91	Mackenzie Schwinghamer; Alberta	109.38	Sandrine Vaillancourt; Quebec	106.89
Big air	Olivia Asselin; Quebec	89.40	Skye Clarke; British Columbia	83.40	Jo Howell; British Columbia	80.20
Halfpipe	Emma Morozumi; Alberta	72.40	Dillan Glennie; Alberta	68.60	Skye Clarke; British Columbia	63.00
Moguls	Mackenzie Schwinghamer; Alberta	80.79	Sandrine Vaillancourt; Quebec	78.18	Florence Delsame; Quebec	76.73
Slopestyle	Skye Clarke; British Columbia	84.60	Megan Cressey; Alberta	78.00	Marilou Bouthiette; Quebec	71.20

== Gymnastics ==
=== Artistic ===
Men

Event	Gold		Silver		Bronze	
Individual all-around	Félix Dolci; Quebec	80.150	David Sandro; Ontario; Félix Blaquière; Quebec	78.600	Not awarded	
Team all-around	Ontario; Dorian Doan; Chris Kaji; David Sandro; Evgeny Siminiuc; Kenji Tamane; Elel Baker	315.200	Quebec; Anthony Balan; Félix Blaquière; Félix Dolci; Maxime Prieur; Igor Velicico; Nathan Yvars	312.400	Nova Scotia; Christopher Bearne; Matthew Brown; Landon Duquette; Andrew Gallant; Alex Watters; Vincent d'Entremont	298.750
Floor exercise	Félix Dolci; Quebec	14.000	Kenji Tamane; Ontario	13.700	Dorian Doan; Ontario	13.350
Horizontal bar	Félix Dolci; Quebec	14.000	Chris Kaji; Ontario	13.150	Anthony Balan; Quebec	12.800
Parallel bars	David Sandro; Ontario	14.350	Evgeny Siminiuc; Ontario	13.750	Félix Blaquière; Quebec	13.150
Pommel horse	David Sandro; Ontario	13.400	Maxime Prieur; Quebec	13.150	Ryan Woodhead; British Columbia	12.950
Rings	Chris Kaji; Ontario	14.200	Félix Dolci; Quebec	13.800	Félix Blaquière; Quebec	13.400
Vault	Félix Dolci; Quebec	14.400	Cameron MacMaster; New Brunswick	13.900	Nathan Yvars; Quebec	13.550

Women

Event	Gold		Silver		Bronze	
Individual all-around	Chloé Lorange; Quebec	37.787	Myrelle Morin; Quebec	37.574	Hannah Scharf; Ontario	37.287
Team all-around	Quebec; Charlotte Chagnon; Gabrielle Deslauriers; Chloé Lorange; Myrelle Morin; Chelsea Murray; Amanda Pedicelli	150.383	Ontario; Alexis DiDomizio; Emma Milne; Hope Moxam; Hannah Scharf; Dahlia Solorzano-Caruso; Kiera Wai	147.608	Alberta; Emma Bragg; Montana Fairbairn; Liz Holmstrom; Jada Mazury; Madison Tansowny; Bryn Topham	145.234
Balance beam	Hannah Scharf; Ontario	9.425	Alexis DiDomizio; Ontario	9.375	Gabrielle Deslauriers; Quebec	9.325
Floor exercise	Montana Fairbairn; Alberta	9.537	Alix Pierce; Saskatchewan	9.462	Hannah Scharf; Ontario	9.400
Uneven bars	Chloé Lorange; Quebec	9.525	Hannah Scharf; Ontario	9.425	Rya Wiebe; Saskatchewan	9.362
Vault	Dahlia Solorzano-Caruso; Ontario	9.612	Emilie Hong; British Columbia	9.587	Chloé Lorange; Quebec	9.575

=== Trampoline ===
Event	Gold		Silver		Bronze	
Men's individual	Rémi Aubin; Quebec	55.630	Zachary Blakely; Alberta	52.775	David Johnston; Ontario	52.030
Men's synchro	Quebec; Rémi Aubin; Benjamin Lagacé	47.130	Manitoba; Tyler Champagne; Isaiah Klassen	45.195	Ontario; Erik Arruda; David Johnston	44.810
Women's individual	Kalena Soehn; Alberta	51.170	Laurence Roux; Quebec	49.170	Sophia Moiseev; Ontario	47.515
Women's synchro	Saskatchewan; Ashley Anaka; Hannah Metheral	43.250	Nova Scotia; Jordyn Henderson; Tia Wamboldt	41.530	Quebec; Sara-Jade Berthiaume; Laurence Roux	41.230
Mixed team	Quebec; Rémi Aubin; Benjamin Lagacé; Sara-Jade Berthiaume; Laurence Roux	107.050	Alberta; Zachary Blakely; Nolan Zurek; Alex Boucher; Kalena Soehn	105.135	British Columbia; Gavin Dodd; Declan McLean; Maja Bonham; Jordyn Yendley	102.050

== Hockey ==
The hockey competitions marked the debut for Nunavut in the sport at the Canada Games.

Event	Gold	Silver	Bronze
Men's tournament	Quebec; Mikael Diotte; Guillaume Richard; Jacob Guévin; Charle Truchon; Tristan Luneau; Olivier Boutin; Zachary L'Heureux; James Malatesta; Olivier Nadeau; Maxime Pellerin; Joshua Roy; Dovar Tinling; Alexi Van Houtte-Cachero; Zachary Bolduc; Justin Stephan Robidas; Anthony Bédard; Tristan Roy; Nathan Gaucher; William Blackburn; William Rousseau	Ontario; Patrick Leaver; Jacob Holmes; Ethan Del Mastro; Isaac Enright; Brandt Clarke; Connor Punnett; Roman Schmidt; Justin O'Donnell; Liam Arnsby; Ethan Larmand; Brennan Othmann; Connor Lockhart; Mason McTavish; Shane Wright; Chase Stillman; Francesco Pinelli; Josh Bloom; Cole Patey; Danny Zhilkin; Ben Gaudreau	Alberta; Olen Zellweger; Corson Ceulemans; Marc Lajoie; Keagan Slaney; Kyle Masters; Colton Dach; Brett Hyland; Zack Ostapchuk; Dylan Guenther; Kai Uchacz; Zack Stringer; Matt Savoie; Jayden Grubbe; Tyson Laventure; Craig Armstrong; Sean Tschigerl; Matt Smith; Owen MacNeil; Loch Gordon; Drew Sim
Women's tournament	Alberta	Quebec	British Columbia

== Judo ==
Men

Event	Gold	Silver	Bronze
50 kg	Félix-Olivier Bertrand; Quebec	Douglas O'Brien; Alberta	Mikey Perry; Prince Edward Island
50 kg	Félix-Olivier Bertrand; Quebec	Douglas O'Brien; Alberta	Lasha Tsatsalashvili; Ontario
55 kg	Simon Paquet; Quebec	Kadin Christ-Bonnell; Manitoba	Korin Gardner; British Columbia
55 kg	Simon Paquet; Quebec	Kadin Christ-Bonnell; Manitoba	Justin Mckay; Saskatchewan
60 kg	Joel Demaere; Alberta	Arno Blacquière; Quebec	Maximus Litzenberger; Saskatchewan
60 kg	Joel Demaere; Alberta	Arno Blacquière; Quebec	Daniel McCristall; Ontario
66 kg	Erik Vandersanden; Ontario	Nathan Demaere; Alberta	Justin Lemire; Quebec
66 kg	Erik Vandersanden; Ontario	Nathan Demaere; Alberta	Finn Schroeder; British Columbia
73 kg	Victor Gougeon-Gazé; Quebec	Nicholas Gagnon; Alberta	Justin Ekosky; Manitoba
73 kg	Victor Gougeon-Gazé; Quebec	Nicholas Gagnon; Alberta	Lochlan Young; British Columbia
81 kg	Alexandre Arencibia; Quebec	Payton Harris; British Columbia	Michael Akbashev; Manitoba
81 kg	Alexandre Arencibia; Quebec	Payton Harris; British Columbia	Taylor Althouse; Alberta
+81 kg	Ian Ryder; British Columbia	Martin Penchev; Quebec	Wilson Elliot; Northwest Territories
+81 kg	Ian Ryder; British Columbia	Martin Penchev; Quebec	Sasha Tanasiuk; Alberta
Team event	Quebec	British Columbia	Alberta
Team event	Quebec	British Columbia	Ontario

Women

Event	Gold	Silver	Bronze
44 kg	Evelyn Beaton; Alberta	Kimiko Kamstra; British Columbia	Sophie Lapointe; Quebec
44 kg	Evelyn Beaton; Alberta	Kimiko Kamstra; British Columbia	Angelina McCristall; Ontario
48 kg	Ema Tesanovic; Alberta	Klavdia Danilkov; British Columbia	Mahée Savoie; New Brunswick
48 kg	Ema Tesanovic; Alberta	Klavdia Danilkov; British Columbia	Mathilde Simard-Lejeune; Quebec
52 kg	Sarah Maloum; Quebec	Kondelia Karas; Alberta	Michelle Grisales; Alberta
52 kg	Sarah Maloum; Quebec	Kondelia Karas; Alberta	Anne Lee; Ontario
57 kg	Kiera Westlake; Alberta	Caleigh Kuramoto; British Columbia	Sarah Ekosky; Manitoba
57 kg	Kiera Westlake; Alberta	Caleigh Kuramoto; British Columbia	Alyssandra Manuel; Ontario
63 kg	Isabelle Harris; British Columbia	Sierra Tanner; Nova Scotia	Samia Boussarhane; Quebec
63 kg	Isabelle Harris; British Columbia	Sierra Tanner; Nova Scotia	Teyana Roberts; Alberta
70 kg	Brae Booth; British Columbia	Ilhem Ouali; Quebec	Bailey Doerfler; Ontario
70 kg	Brae Booth; British Columbia	Ilhem Ouali; Quebec	Keeley Hussey; New Brunswick
+70 kg	Coralie Godbout; Quebec	Sam Ulrich; Manitoba	Nessa Keays; Saskatchewan
+70 kg	Coralie Godbout; Quebec	Sam Ulrich; Manitoba	Emma Mullett; Newfoundland and Labrador
Team event	Alberta	British Columbia	Ontario
Team event	Alberta	British Columbia	Quebec

== Ringette ==
Event	Gold	Silver	Bronze
Women's tournament	Quebec	Ontario	Manitoba

Preceded by Prince George, British Columbia, 2015	2019 Canada Winter Games; Red Deer, Alberta; Ringette at the 2019 Canada Winter Games	Succeeded by Prince Edward Island

== Short track speed skating ==
Men

Event	Gold		Silver		Bronze	
500 m	William Dandjinou; Quebec	41.671	Nicolas Perreault; Quebec	41.758	Brendan Yamada; Alberta	42.608
1000 m	Nicolas Perreault; Quebec	1:27.013	William Dandjinou; Quebec	1:27.099	Manuel Falardeau; Quebec	1:27.559
1500 m	William Dandjinou; Quebec	2:15.974	Nicolas Perreault; Quebec	2:16.068	Matej Pederson; Alberta	2:16.346
3000 m points race	Nicolas Perreault; Quebec	10,000 pts.	William Dandjinou; Quebec	8,000 pts.	Manuel Falardeau; Quebec	6,400 pts.
Relay	Quebec; William Dandjinou; Manuel Falardeau; Nicolas Perreault; Félix Pigeon; Félix Roussel	4:04.003	Alberta; Mathias Bathe; Benjamin Côté; Matej Pederson; Neithan Thomas; Brendan Yamada	4:04.956	New Brunswick; Anthony Losier; Colton Gough; Tyler MaGee; Conor Murray; Sam Myers	4:38.349

Women

Event	Gold		Silver		Bronze	
500 m	Hee-Won Son; Alberta	45.323	Claudia Heeney; Ontario	45.368	Juliette Brindamour; Quebec	45.448
1000 m	Juliette Brindamour; Quebec	1:39.383	Roxanne Beaudry; Quebec	1:39.556	Kélian Quevillon; Quebec	1:39.563
1500 m	Juliette Brindamour; Quebec	2:29.220	Léa Chamberland-Dostie; Quebec	2:29.577	Roxanne Beaudry; Quebec	2:29.642
3000 m points race	Claudia Heeney; Ontario	10,000 pts.	Juliette Brindamour; Quebec	8,000 pts.	Kélian Quevillon; Quebec	6,400 pts.
Relay	Quebec; Juliette Brindamour; Roxanne Beaudry; Léa Chamberland-Dostie; Kélian Quevillon; Léa Tessier	4:21.832	Alberta; Cezara Bere; Victoria Goplen; Caitlin Pelkey; Hee-Won Son; Molly Young	4:28.580	British Columbia; Sherilyn Chung; Annabelle Green; Jane Green; Ainsley Spencer; Samantha Spencer	4:43.968

== Speed skating ==
Men

Event	Gold		Silver		Bronze	
500 m	Tyson Langelaar; Manitoba	1:14.73	Cédrick Brunet; Quebec	1:15.27	Antoine Gagnon-Lamarche; Quebec	1:15.62
1000 m	Tyson Langelaar; Manitoba	1:12.79	Kaleb Muller; Alberta	1:14.56	Josh Telizyn; British Columbia	1:14.65
1500 m	Tyson Langelaar; Manitoba	1:56.12	Kaleb Muller; Alberta	1:57.55	Matthew Laxton; Ontario	2:00.89
5000 m	Kaleb Muller; Alberta	6:52.95	Tyson Langelaar; Manitoba	6:56.36	Joshua Hathaway; Alberta	7:00.65
Mass start	Tyson Langelaar; Manitoba		Matthew Laxton; Ontario		Cédrick Brunet; Quebec	
Team pursuit	Alberta; Paul Coderre; Max Halyk; Joshua Hathaway; Kaleb Muller	4:05.41	Quebec; Cédrick Brunet; Antoine Gagnon-Lamarche; William Bilodeau; William Sohier	4:16.28	Ontario; Noah Bouma; Max Brant; Gibby Himbeault; Matthew Laxton	4:16.54

Women

Event	Gold		Silver		Bronze	
500 m	Brooklyn McDougall; Alberta	1:20.74	Rose Laliberté-Roy; Quebec	1:23.31	Véronique Déry; Quebec	1:25.19
1000 m	Alexa Scott; Manitoba	1:22.26	Brooklyn McDougall; Alberta	1:23.37	Véronique Déry; Quebec	1:24.73
1500 m	Brooklyn McDougall; Alberta	2:16.69	Rose-Anne Grenier; Quebec	2:18.11	Emmanuelle Côté; Quebec	2:19.73
3000 m	Alexa Scott; Manitoba	4:33.83	Rose-Anne Grenier; Quebec	4:42.23	Brooklyn McDougall; Alberta	4:44.28
Mass start	Alexa Scott; Manitoba		Rose-Anne Grenier; Quebec		Emmanuelle Côté; Alberta	
Team pursuit	Quebec; Emmanuelle Côté; Véronique Déry; Rose-Anne Grenier; Rose Laliberté-Roy	3:28.70	Alberta; Anna Bourgeois; Brooklyn McDougall; Kayla McNeely; Cassidy Peterson	3:33.05	British Columbia; Brooke Braun; Laura Hall; Yuna Lovell; Amanda Mitchell	3:44.99

== Squash ==
Event	Gold	Silver	Bronze
Men's individual	Liam Marrison; Ontario	Neel Ismail; Ontario	Douglas Kosciukiewicz; Nova Scotia
Women's individual	Lucia Bicknell; British Columbia	Charlotte Orcutt; Ontario	Brianna Jefferson; Ontario
Men's team	Ontario; Dylan Deverill; Neel Ismail; Nikhil Ismail; Liam Marrison	British Columbia; Matt Bicknell; Sam Scivier; James Toth; Gabriel Yun	Alberta; Mohamed Kamal; Ben Boulanger; Seif Elfiky; Antonio Mendes
Women's team	Ontario; Molly Chadwick; Brianna Jefferson; Salma Mounir; Charlotte Orcutt	British Columbia; Lucia Bicknell; Cindy Cao; Sarah Cao; Quan Ng	Alberta; Bethany Churchill; Jana Dweek; Taylor Mackay; Nicole Temple

== Table tennis ==
Event	Gold	Silver	Bronze
Men's individual	Edward Ly; Quebec	Steve Wang; British Columbia	David Hong Lin; British Columbia
Women's individual	Benita Zhou; British Columbia	Ann Shiao; Ontario	Sophie Gauthier; Quebec
Men's doubles	Quebec; Matteo Martin; Tommy Xu	British Columbia; Kenny Kun Jiang; Steve Wang	Ontario; Sam Orend; David Xu
Women's doubles	British Columbia; Jiayi Nie; Benita Zhou	Ontario; Ann Shiao; Jin Wu	Quebec; Emilia Mallette; Katherine Morin
Mixed doubles	Quebec; Edward Ly; Sophie Gauthier	Ontario; Alexander Bu; Chen Yu-hsan	Alberta; James Li; Judy Pan
Men's team	Quebec; Edward Ly; Matteo Martin; Tommy Xu	Ontario; Alexander Bu; Sam Orend; David Xu	British Columbia; Kenny Kun Jiang; David Hong Lin; Steve Wang
Women's team	British Columbia; Patrina Hui; Jiayi Nie; Benita Zhou	Ontario; Sabrina Chen; Ann Shiao; Jin Wu	Quebec; Emilia Mallette; Sophie Gauthier; Katherine Morin

== Wheelchair basketball ==
Event	Gold	Silver	Bronze
Mixed tournament	Alberta	Ontario	Quebec
