= Ice hockey at the 2019 Canada Winter Games – Men's tournament =

2019 Canada Winter Games

Tournament details
- Venue(s): 3 (in 1 host city)
- Dates: February 16–22
- Teams: 13

Final positions
- Champions: Quebec (2nd title)
- Runner-up: Ontario
- Third place: Alberta
- Fourth place: Saskatchewan

Tournament statistics
- Games played: 40
- Goals scored: 346 (8.65 per game)
- Scoring leader(s): Jack Campbell (17 points)

The men's tournament in ice hockey at the 2019 Canada Winter Games was held in Red Deer, Alberta between February 16 and 22, 2019. Thirteen provinces and territories competed in the tournament, including Nunavut participating for the first time.

== Preliminary round ==
All times are local (UTC−7).

Key

Provinces/Territories qualified for the quarterfinals round are in green
Provinces/Territories qualified for the qualification round are in lavender blue

=== Group A ===
Team	Pld	W	OTW	OTL	L	GF	GA	GD	Pts
Quebec	3	3	0	0	0	22	7	+15	9
Ontario	3	2	0	0	1	18	11	+7	6
Nova Scotia	3	1	0	0	2	6	17	−11	3
New Brunswick	3	0	0	0	3	8	19	−11	0

February 16, 2019; 16:00	New Brunswick	2–5 (0–1, 2–2, 0–2)	Quebec	Downtown Arena, Red Deer

Game reference
Nicholas Sheehan	Goalies	William Blackburn
14 min	Penalties	14 min
30	Shots	49

February 16, 2019; 19:30	Nova Scotia	0–5 (0–2, 0–1, 0–2)	Ontario	Downtown Arena, Red Deer

Game reference
Jacob Goobie	Goalies	Benjamin Gaudreau
29 min	Penalties	14 min
24	Shots	52

February 17, 2019; 12:30	Nova Scotia	2–10 (2–4, 0–4, 0–2)	Quebec	Downtown Arena, Red Deer

Game reference
Kenzie MacPhail; Jacob Goobie	Goalies	William Rousseau
6 min	Penalties	8 min
31	Shots	53

February 17, 2019; 16:00	New Brunswick	4–10 (2–5, 1–2, 1–3)	Ontario	Downtown Arena, Red Deer

Game reference
Pierre-Vincent Guignard; Nicholas Sheehan	Goalies	Patrick Leaver
22 min	Penalties	28 min
35	Shots	45

February 18, 2019; 12:30	New Brunswick	2–4 (0–1, 1–1, 1–2)	Nova Scotia	Downtown Arena, Red Deer

Game reference
Nicholas Sheehan	Goalies	Jacob Goobie
14 min	Penalties	10 min
31	Shots	44

February 18, 2019; 19:30	Ontario	3–7 (2–4, 1–1, 0–2)	Quebec	Downtown Arena, Red Deer

Game reference
Benjamin Gaudreau	Goalies	William Blackburn
22 min	Penalties	10 min
19	Shots	61

=== Group B ===
Team	Pld	W	OTW	OTL	L	GF	GA	GD	Pts
Alberta	3	2	0	1	0	14	13	+1	7
Saskatchewan	3	1	1	0	1	14	8	+6	5
Manitoba	3	1	0	0	2	10	15	−5	3
British Columbia	3	1	0	0	2	10	12	−2	3

February 16, 2019; 16:00	British Columbia	2–4 (1–0, 1–2, 0–2)	Manitoba	Centrium, Red Deer

Game reference
Keegan Maddocks	Goalies	Tyler Brennan
8 min	Penalties	4 min
39	Shots	28

February 16, 2019; 19:30	Alberta	3–4 OT (2–1, 1–1, 0–1) (OT: 0–1)	Saskatchewan	Centrium, Red Deer

Game reference
Drew Sim	Goalies	Brett Mirwald
14 min	Penalties	12 min
43	Shots	22

February 17, 2019; 12:30	British Columbia	4–3 (1–2, 1–0, 2–1)	Saskatchewan	Centrium, Red Deer

Game reference
Thomas Milic	Goalies	Brett Mirwald
4 min	Penalties	10 min
30	Shots	31

February 17, 2019; 16:00	Alberta	6–5 (5–1, 1–2, 0–2)	Manitoba	Centrium, Red Deer

Game reference
Lochlan Gordon	Goalies	Jayden Catellier
16 min	Penalties	10 min
33	Shots	27

February 18, 2019; 12:30	Manitoba	1–7 (0–2, 1–3, 0–2)	Saskatchewan	Centrium, Red Deer

Game reference
Tyler Brennan	Goalies	Brett Mirwald
18 min	Penalties	12 min
24	Shots	45

February 18, 2019; 19:30	Alberta	5–4 (0–2, 2–1, 3–1)	British Columbia	Centrium, Red Deer

Game reference
Drew Sim	Goalies	Thomas Milic
8 min	Penalties	6 min
41	Shots	31

=== Group C ===
Team	Pld	W	OTW	OTL	L	GF	GA	GD	Pts
Newfoundland and Labrador	4	3	1	0	0	23	8	+15	11
Prince Edward Island	4	3	0	1	0	21	8	+13	10
Northwest Territories	4	2	0	0	2	15	10	+5	6
Nunavut	4	1	0	0	3	7	28	−21	3
Yukon	4	0	0	0	4	7	19	−12	0

February 16, 2019; 12:30	Newfoundland and Labrador	5–3 (0–1, 2–1, 3–1)	Northwest Territories	Downtown Arena, Red Deer

Game reference
Evan Martin	Goalies	Liam Tereposky
26 min	Penalties	26 min
37	Shots	26

February 16, 2019; 12:30	Prince Edward Island	3–2 (0–2, 1–0, 2–0)	Yukon	Centrium, Red Deer

Game reference
Josh Smith	Goalies	Dawson Smith
8 min	Penalties	8 min
53	Shots	18

February 17, 2019; 09:00	Nunavut	5–3 (1–1, 1–2, 3–0)	Yukon	Downtown Arena, Red Deer

Game reference
Inuuki Burke; Deion Ipirq-Pearce	Goalies	Dawson Smith
20 min	Penalties	28 min
38	Shots	37

February 17, 2019; 09:00	Northwest Territories	2–3 (1–0, 0–2, 1–1)	Prince Edward Island	Centrium, Red Deer

Game reference
Liam Tereposky	Goalies	Aiden Williams
22 min	Penalties	20 min
8	Shots	44

February 17, 2019; 19:30	Newfoundland and Labrador	7–2 (0–2, 3–0, 4–0)	Nunavut	Downtown Arena, Red Deer

Game reference
William Dyke	Goalies	Deion Ipirq-Pearce
20 min	Penalties	12 min
49	Shots	19

February 17, 2019; 19:30	Northwest Territories	4–2 (2–1, 1–0, 1–1)	Yukon	Centrium, Red Deer

Game reference
Liam Tereposky	Goalies	Dawson Smith
6 min	Penalties	36 min
36	Shots	26

February 18, 2019; 09:00	Newfoundland and Labrador	7–0 (1–0, 2–0, 4–0)	Yukon	Downtown Arena, Red Deer

Game reference
William Dyke	Goalies	Dawson Smith; Max Wolsnyuk
18 min	Penalties	41 min
52	Shots	11

February 18, 2019; 09:00	Nunavut	0–12 (0–2, 0–5, 0–5)	Prince Edward Island	Centrium, Red Deer

Game reference
Inuuki Burke	Goalies	Josh Smith
14 min	Penalties	22 min
13	Shots	51

February 18, 2019; 16:00	Northwest Territories	6–0 (3–0, 1–0, 2–0)	Nunavut	Downtown Arena, Red Deer

Game reference
Liam Tereposky; Devon Vogel	Goalies	Colby Knight; Inuuki Burke
24 min	Penalties	18 min
31	Shots	17

February 18, 2019; 16:00	Prince Edward Island	4–3 OT (1–1, 1–2, 1–0) (OT: 1–0)	Newfoundland and Labrador	Centrium, Red Deer

Game reference
William Dyke	Goalies	Aiden Williams
10 min	Penalties	14 min
27	Shots	30

== Playoff round ==
=== Bracket ===
Qualifying
February 19
Prince Edward Island	1
British Columbia	15
February 19
Newfoundland and Labrador	3
New Brunswick	6

Quarterfinals
February 20
Quebec	7
British Columbia	3
February 20
Saskatchewan	6
Nova Scotia	3
February 20
Ontario	6
Manitoba	3
February 20
Alberta	8
New Brunswick	3

Semifinals
February 21
Quebec	6
Saskatchewan	3
February 21
Ontario	8
Alberta	4

Gold medal game
February 22
Quebec (OT)	4
Ontario	3
Bronze medal game
February 22
Saskatchewan	0
Alberta	12

Fifth place bracket

5–8th place semifinals
February 21
British Columbia	2
Nova Scotia (OT)	3
February 21
Manitoba	6
New Brunswick	2

Fifth place game
February 22
Nova Scotia	5
Manitoba	7
Seventh place game
February 22
British Columbia	7
New Brunswick	2

Ninth place bracket

9–12th place semifinals
February 20
Prince Edward Island	6
Northwest Territories	2
February 20
Nunavut	2
Newfoundland and Labrador	6

Ninth place game
February 21
Prince Edward Island	7
Newfoundland and Labrador	4
Eleventh place game
February 21
Northwest Territories	4
Nunavut	2

=== Qualifying round ===
February 19, 2019; 19:30	Newfoundland and Labrador	3–6 (1–2, 2–3, 0–1)	New Brunswick	Downtown Arena, Red Deer

Game reference
Evan Martin	Goalies	Pierre-Vincent Guignard
22 min	Penalties	26 min
32	Shots	37

February 19, 2019; 19:30	British Columbia	15–1 (7–0, 6–1, 2–0)	Prince Edward Island	Centrium, Red Deer

Game reference
Keegan Maddocks	Goalies	Josh Smith; Aiden Williams
16 min	Penalties	22 min
51	Shots	21

=== 9–12th place placement round ===
February 20, 2019; 12:30	Newfoundland and Labrador	6–2 (3–0, 2–1, 1–1)	Nunavut	Downtown Arena, Red Deer

Game reference
William Dyke	Goalies	Inuuki Burke
20 min	Penalties	8 min
41	Shots	21

February 20, 2019; 12:30	Northwest Territories	2–6 (2–2, 0–4, 0–0)	Prince Edward Island	Centrium, Red Deer

Game reference
Liam Tereposky	Goalies	Aiden Williams
20 min	Penalties	14 min
32	Shots	53

=== Quarterfinals ===
February 20, 2019; 16:00	Manitoba	3–6 (0–3, 2–1, 1–2)	Ontario	Downtown Arena, Red Deer

Game reference
Tyler Brennan	Goalies	Benjamin Gaudreau
20 min	Penalties	16 min
37	Shots	50

February 20, 2019; 16:00	Nova Scotia	3–6 (1–1, 1–2, 1–3)	Saskatchewan	Centrium, Red Deer

Game reference
Jacob Goobie	Goalies	Brett Mirwald
4 min	Penalties	6 min
37	Shots	33

February 20, 2019; 19:30	British Columbia	3–7 (0–1, 1–1, 2–5)	Quebec	Downtown Arena, Red Deer

Game reference
Thomas Milic	Goalies	William Blackburn
24 min	Penalties	10 min
30	Shots	62

February 20, 2019; 19:30	New Brunswick	3–8 (3–4, 0–4, 0–0)	Alberta	Centrium, Red Deer

Game reference
Nicholas Sheehan; Pierre-Vincent Guignard	Goalies	Lochlan Gordon; Drew Sim
30 min	Penalties	16 min
19	Shots	51

=== Eleventh place game ===
February 21, 2019; 08:30	Nunavut	2–4 (0–1, 0–2, 2–1)	Northwest Territories	Kinex Arena, Red Deer

Game reference
Colby Knight	Goalies	Liam Tereposky
20 min	Penalties	24 min
39	Shots	32

=== Ninth place game ===
February 21, 2019; 14:00	Prince Edward Island	7–4 (0–2, 3–1, 4–1)	Newfoundland and Labrador	Kinex Arena, Red Deer

Game reference
Josh Smith	Goalies	Evan Martin
16 min	Penalties	10 min
38	Shots	32

=== 5–8th place placement round ===
February 21, 2019; 12:30	New Brunswick	2–6 (1–2, 1–2, 0–2)	Manitoba	Centrium, Red Deer

Game reference
Pierre-Vincent Guignard	Goalies	Tyler Brennan; Jayden Catellier
12 min	Penalties	10 min
41	Shots	45

February 21, 2019; 19:30	British Columbia	2–3 OT (1–1, 0–1, 1–0) (OT: 0–1)	Nova Scotia	Kinex Arena, Red Deer

Game reference
Keegan Maddocks	Goalies	Jacob Goobie
16 min	Penalties	12 min
30	Shots	41

=== 7th place game ===
February 22, 2019; 12:30	New Brunswick	2–7 (0–0, 1–5, 1–2)	British Columbia	Kinex Arena, Red Deer

Game reference
Nicholas Sheehan	Goalies	Thomas Milic
12 min	Penalties	29 min
31	Shots	35

=== 5th place game ===
February 22, 2019; 12:30	Nova Scotia	5–7 (1–2, 1–2, 3–3)	Manitoba	Centrium, Red Deer

Game reference
Jacob Goobie	Goalies	Jayden Catellier
6 min	Penalties	20 min
29	Shots	33

=== Semifinals ===
February 21, 2019; 16:00	Saskatchewan	3–6 (2–0, 0–4, 1–2)	Quebec	Centrium, Red Deer

Game reference
Brett Mirwald	Goalies	William Blackburn
24 min	Penalties	12 min
21	Shots	47

February 21, 2019; 19:30	Ontario	8–4 (2–0, 4–0, 2–4)	Alberta	Centrium, Red Deer

Game reference
Benjamin Gaudreau	Goalies	Drew Sim
16 min	Penalties	18 min
26	Shots	44

=== Bronze medal game ===
February 22, 2019; 16:00	Saskatchewan	0–12 (0–1, 0–8, 0–3)	Alberta	Centrium, Red Deer

Game reference

Brett Mirwald
Justin Dueck
Goalies
Drew Sim

0–1	13:07 – Savoie (Hyland, Guenther)
0–2	25:37 – Savoie (Guenther)
0–3	27:01 – Savoie (Hyland, Guenther)
0–4	27:55 – Armstrong
0–5	28:18 – Laventure (Dach)
0–6	30:26 – Armstrong (Ostapchuk, MacNeil)
0–7	35:45 – Stringer (Grubbe, Slaney)
0–8	37:50 – Guenther (Savoie, Ceulemans)
0–9	39:48 – Guenther (Savoie, Ostapchuk)
0–10	48:08 – Zellweger (Stringer, Uchacz
0–11	53:16 – Lajoie (Laventure, Armstrong) (PP)
0–12	58:56 – MacNeil (Armstrong)

28 min
Penalties
28 min
36
Shots
25

=== Gold medal game ===
February 22, 2019; 19:30	Ontario	3–4 OT (0–2, 3–0, 0–1) (OT: 0–1)	Quebec	Centrium, Red Deer

Game reference

Benjamin Gaudreau
Goalies
William Blackburn

	0–1	12:14 – Richard (Nadeau, L'Heureux) (PP)
	0–2	17:35 – Pellerin (Richard)
Punnett (Bloom) – 27:46	1–2
Schmidt (Pinelli) – 32:28	2–2
Othmann (Arnsby, Wright) – 36:57	3–2
	3–3	42:37 – Roy (Robidas, Nadeau) (PP)
	3–4	70:39 – L'Heureux (Tinling)

4 min
Penalties
6 min
41
Shots
36

== Final ranking and statistics ==
=== Final ranking ===
Rank	Team
1st place, gold medalist(s)	Quebec
2nd place, silver medalist(s)	Ontario
3rd place, bronze medalist(s)	Alberta
4	Saskatchewan
5	Manitoba
6	Nova Scotia
7	British Columbia
8	New Brunswick
9	Newfoundland and Labrador
10	Prince Edward Island
11	Northwest Territories
12	Nunavut
13	Yukon

=== Scoring leaders ===
List shows the top skaters sorted by points, then goals.

Player	GP	G	A	Pts	PIM
(Prince Edward Island) Jack Campbell	7	3	14	17	8
(Ontario) Brennan Othmann	6	10	6	16	6
(Newfoundland and Labrador) Ryan Greene	7	8	7	15	10
(Newfoundland and Labrador) Zachary Dean	7	2	13	15	12
(Quebec) Zachary L'Heureux	6	10	3	13	2
(Alberta) Matthew Savoie	6	6	7	13	4
(British Columbia) Logan Stankoven	7	6	7	13	2
(Alberta) Dylan Guenther	6	4	9	13	0
(Quebec) Joshua Roy	6	4	9	13	0
(Northwest Territories) Samuel Schofield	6	6	6	12	24
(Ontario) Shane Wright	6	6	6	12	8

Source: HockeyCanada.ca

=== Leading goaltenders ===
Only the top five goaltenders, based on Goals Against Average, who played at least 120 minutes, are included in this list.

Player	GP	TOI	GA	GAA	SA	SV%	SO
William Dyke	4	245:00	7	1.71	81	.914	1
(British Columbia) Keegan Maddocks	3	185:00	7	2.27	89	.921	0
William Blackburn	5	311:00	14	2.70	141	.901	0
(Northwest Territories) Liam Tereposky	6	350:00	18	3.09	214	.916	0
(Alberta) Drew Sim	5	285:00	16	3.37	126	.873	1

Source: HockeyCanada.ca
