= Ringette at the 2023 Canada Winter Games =

2023 Ringette 2023 Canada Winter Games
Tournament details
- Venue(s): Cavendish Farms Wellness Centre and MacLauchlan Arena at the University of Prince Edward Island (in Montague and Charlottetown in Prince Edward Island host cities)
- Dates: February 19 – 25
- Teams: 9
- Defending champions: Quebec

Final positions
- Champions: Quebec
- Runners-up: Alberta
- Third place: Saskatchewan

Ringette at the 2023 Canada Winter Games took place in Prince Edward Island at the Cavendish Farms Wellness Centre in Montague and the MacLauchlan Arena at the University of Prince Edward Island in Charlottetown. The event ran from Sunday, February 19, 2023, to Saturday, February 25, 2023.

== History ==
Team P.E.I. (Prince Edward Island) made history after finishing in fourth place, having never finished higher than ninth place since the 1991 Canada Winter Games. Team P.E.I fell to Team Saskatchewan in the 2023 bronze medal game. The game had been tied at 4-4 until Saskatchewan scored in overtime.

Prior to their historic performance at the 2023 Canada Winter Games (CWG), the team had only won a single game during the 2003 Canada Winter Games in New Brunswick. The Prince Edward Island team came in eighth place during the 1991 Canada Games in Charlottetown, P.E.I., the year which also marked the inaugural inclusion of ringette in the Games competition.

== Medallists ==
Ringette	Gold	Silver	Bronze
Women	Quebec; Julia Franco; Juliette Lessard; Amy Whyte; Maxim Moisan; Lili Moreau; Alex Violette; Zoe Aubin; Lauriane Alain; Maude Ouellet; Brittany Lanouette; Annie Trudel; Caroline Viola; Raphaëlle Chouinard; Florence Poulin; Allyson Savoie; Eléonore Sezia; Laurence Lacombe	Alberta; Mia Hemstreet; Mikyla Brewster; Kennedy Rice; Emily Dodd; Kirsten Krochak; Cayleigh Hasell; Avery Kew; Kaleigh Ryan-York; Jamie Ferri; Kaeli Woodliffe; Rachael McKerracher; Sydnie Rock; Jazmyn Fevin; Sydney Fevin Canada, 2022 WRC; Erin Ung; Paige Roy; Regan Meier; Kaylee Armstrong	Saskatchewan; Tobi Albert; Kylee Banerd; Rylie Bryden; Cadence Howe; Taylor Johnston; Ally Lenz; Leyna Matisz; Kaitlynn McCaw; Ella McLeod; Maddy Nystrom; Meagan Sanders; Lauren Schoenhofen; Brianna Shupe; Madeline Stang; Bailey Stangel; Bryn White; Shea White

== Notable players ==
=== World Ringette Championships ===
Erin Ung, Paige Roy, Mikyla Brewster, Regan Meier, and Kaylee Armstrong all played for the Under-21 Canada national ringette team at the 2022 World Ringette Championships.

=== National Ringette League ===
Team Alberta which finished in second place included Erin Ung, Mikyla Brewster, Cayleigh Hasell, Kennedy Rice, and Rachael McKerracher, players in the 2022–23 National Ringette League from the Calgary RATH, and Kaleigh Ryan-York and Jamie Ferri from the Edmonton WAM!.

Team Saskatchewan which finished in third place, included Ally Lenz, Kaitlynn McCaw, Madeline Stang, and Bailey Stangel, all of whom were players from the Saskatchewan Heat.

Team Québec which won the gold medal for the 2023 Canada Winter Games included the following 2022–23 National Ringette League players: Amy Whyte, Maxim Moisan⁣, and Alex Violette⁣ from the Gatineau Fusion, Lauriane Alain⁣, Brittany Lanouette⁣, Caroline Viola, Eléonore Sezia and Laurence Lacombe from the Rive-Sud Révolution, and Annie Trudel, Raphaëlle Chouinard, and Allyson Savoie from the Montreal Mission.

== Final standings ==
The final standings for the 2023 Canada Winter Games ringette tournament are listed in the table below.

Placing	Team
1st place, gold medalist(s)	Québec
2nd place, silver medalist(s)	Alberta
3rd place, bronze medalist(s)	Saskatchewan
4	Prince Edward Island
5	New Brunswick
6	Manitoba
7	Ontario
8	British Columbia
9	Nova Scotia

Preceded by 2019 Canada Winter Games; Red Deer, Alberta Ringette at the 2019 Canada Winter Games	2023 Canada Winter Games; Prince Edward Island; Ringette at the 2023 Canada Winter Games	Succeeded by 2027 Canada Winter Games; Ringette at the 2027 Canada Winter Games
