= 2024 Canadian Open (January) =

Grand Slam of Curling event

2024 Co-op Canadian Open
- Host city: Red Deer, Alberta
- Arena: Servus Arena
- Dates: January 16–21
- Men's winner: (Scotland) Team Mouat
- Curling club: Gogar Park CC, Edinburgh
- Skip: Bruce Mouat
- Third: Grant Hardie
- Second: Bobby Lammie
- Lead: Hammy McMillan Jr.
- Coach: Michael Goodfellow
- Finalist: (Alberta) Brendan Bottcher
- Women's winner: (Ontario) Team Homan
- Curling club: Ottawa CC, Ottawa
- Skip: Rachel Homan
- Third: Tracy Fleury
- Second: Emma Miskew
- Lead: Sarah Wilkes
- Alternate: Rachelle Brown
- Coach: Don Bartlett
- Finalist: (Switzerland) Silvana Tirinzoni

The 2024 Co-op Canadian Open was held from January 16 to 21 at the Servus Arena in Red Deer, Alberta. It was the fourth Grand Slam event and third major of the 2023–24 curling season.

The event was held in a round robin format for the first time since 2013.

== Qualification ==
The top 15 ranked men's and women's teams on the World Curling Federation's world team rankings as of December 18, 2023, qualified for the event. The Grand Slam of Curling may fill one spot in each division as a sponsor's exemption. In the event that a team declines their invitation, the next-ranked team on the world team ranking is invited until the field is complete. The sixteenth spots were filled by the 2023 Tour Challenge Tier 2 champions.

On January 14, two days before the event began, Team Stefania Constantini of Italy withdrew for medical reasons. Their spot was filled by the highest ranked Alberta women's team as of the December 18 cutoff, which was Team Selena Sturmay. The schedule was unchanged.

=== Men ===
Top world team ranking men's teams:

1. (Italy) Joël Retornaz
2. (Alberta) Brendan Bottcher
3. (Switzerland) Yannick Schwaller
4. (Scotland) Bruce Mouat
5. (Sweden) Niklas Edin
6. (Newfoundland and Labrador) Brad Gushue
7. (Scotland) Ross Whyte
8. (Manitoba) Matt Dunstone
9. (Alberta) Kevin Koe
10. (Norway) Magnus Ramsfjell
11. (Manitoba) Reid Carruthers
12. (United States) Korey Dropkin
13. (Scotland) James Craik
14. (Saskatchewan) Mike McEwen
15. (Switzerland) Michael Brunner

Tour Challenge Tier 2 champion:

- (United States) Daniel Casper

=== Women ===
Top world team ranking women's teams:

1. (Switzerland) Silvana Tirinzoni
2. (Ontario) Rachel Homan
3. (South Korea) Gim Eun-ji
4. (Manitoba) Kerri Einarson
5. (Manitoba) Jennifer Jones
6. (Sweden) Anna Hasselborg
7. (Sweden) Isabella Wranå
8. (Japan) Satsuki Fujisawa
9. (Italy) ~~Stefania Constantini~~
10. (South Korea) ~~Kim Eun-jung~~
11. (Manitoba) Kaitlyn Lawes
12. (United States) Tabitha Peterson
13. (Scotland) Rebecca Morrison
14. (Norway) ~~Marianne Rørvik~~
15. (Manitoba) Kate Cameron
16. (United States) Delaney Strouse

Tour Challenge Tier 2 champion:

- (South Korea) Kim Eun-jung

Sponsor's Exemption:

- (Manitoba) Jolene Campbell

Emergency Replacement:

- (Alberta) Selena Sturmay

== Men ==
=== Teams ===
The teams are listed as follows:

Skip	Third	Second	Lead	Locale
Brendan Bottcher	Marc Kennedy	Brett Gallant	Ben Hebert	Calgary, Alberta
Michael Brunner	Anthony Petoud	Romano Meier	Andreas Gerlach	Bern, Switzerland
Brad Jacobs	Reid Carruthers	Derek Samagalski	Connor Njegovan	Winnipeg, Manitoba
Daniel Casper	Luc Violette	Ben Richardson	Chase Sinnett	(United States) Chaska, Minnesota
James Craik	Mark Watt	Angus Bryce	Blair Haswell	Forfar, Scotland
Korey Dropkin (Fourth)	Andrew Stopera (Skip)	Mark Fenner	Thomas Howell	(United States) Duluth, Minnesota
Matt Dunstone	B. J. Neufeld	Colton Lott	Ryan Harnden	Winnipeg, Manitoba
Niklas Edin	Oskar Eriksson	Rasmus Wranå	Christoffer Sundgren	Karlstad, Sweden
Brad Gushue	Mark Nichols	E. J. Harnden	Geoff Walker	St. John's, Newfoundland and Labrador
Kevin Koe	Tyler Tardi	Jacques Gauthier	Karrick Martin	Calgary, Alberta
Mike McEwen	Colton Flasch	Kevin Marsh	Dan Marsh	Saskatoon, Saskatchewan
Bruce Mouat	Grant Hardie	Bobby Lammie	Hammy McMillan Jr.	Stirling, Scotland
Magnus Ramsfjell	Martin Sesaker	Bendik Ramsfjell	Gaute Nepstad	Trondheim, Norway
Joël Retornaz	Amos Mosaner	Sebastiano Arman	Mattia Giovanella	Trentino, Italy
Benoît Schwarz-van Berkel (Fourth)	Yannick Schwaller (Skip)	Sven Michel	Pablo Lachat	Geneva, Switzerland
Ross Whyte	Robin Brydone	Duncan McFadzean	Euan Kyle	Stirling, Scotland

=== Round robin standings ===
Final Round Robin Standings

Key
Teams to Playoffs
Teams to Tiebreaker

Pool A	W	L	PF	PA	SO
(Manitoba) Matt Dunstone	3	1	24	15	9
(Italy) Joël Retornaz	2	2	19	16	2
(Alberta) Kevin Koe	2	2	23	25	15
(United States) Daniel Casper	1	3	21	30	14

Pool D	W	L	PF	PA	SO
(Scotland) Bruce Mouat	4	0	32	13	3
(Scotland) James Craik	2	2	16	21	4
(Sweden) Niklas Edin	1	3	19	23	7
(United States) Team Dropkin	1	3	12	23	11

Pool B	W	L	PF	PA	SO
(Scotland) Ross Whyte	4	0	26	13	8
(Alberta) Brendan Bottcher	3	1	23	19	5
(Norway) Magnus Ramsfjell	1	3	12	22	6
(Switzerland) Michael Brunner	0	4	8	26	16

Pool C	W	L	PF	PA	SO
(Switzerland) Yannick Schwaller	4	0	27	14	1
(Newfoundland and Labrador) Brad Gushue	2	2	19	13	10
(Manitoba) Team Carruthers	1	3	23	25	12
(Saskatchewan) Mike McEwen	1	3	16	22	13

=== Round robin results ===
All draw times are listed in Mountain Time (UTC−07:00).

==== Draw 1 ====
Tuesday, January 16, 8:00 am

Sheet A	1	2	3	4	5	6	7	8	Final
(Newfoundland and Labrador) Brad Gushue	0	1	1	1	0	4	X	X	7
(Norway) Magnus Ramsfjell 🔨	0	0	0	0	1	0	X	X	1

Sheet B	1	2	3	4	5	6	7	8	Final
(Alberta) Brendan Bottcher 🔨	0	3	0	2	0	0	2	0	7
(Saskatchewan) Mike McEwen	0	0	2	0	3	0	0	1	6

Sheet C	1	2	3	4	5	6	7	8	Final
(Scotland) Ross Whyte 🔨	2	0	0	1	0	2	0	1	6
(Manitoba) Team Carruthers	0	2	0	0	1	0	2	0	5

Sheet D	1	2	3	4	5	6	7	8	Final
(Switzerland) Yannick Schwaller 🔨	1	0	2	4	1	X	X	X	8
(Switzerland) Michael Brunner	0	1	0	0	0	X	X	X	1

==== Draw 3 ====
Tuesday, January 16, 3:00 pm

Sheet A	1	2	3	4	5	6	7	8	Final
(Sweden) Niklas Edin 🔨	0	2	0	1	0	0	1	0	4
(Alberta) Kevin Koe	0	0	2	0	0	3	0	2	7

Sheet B	1	2	3	4	5	6	7	8	9	Final
(Italy) Joël Retornaz	0	1	0	0	1	0	0	2	0	4
(Scotland) James Craik 🔨	2	0	0	1	0	1	0	0	1	5

Sheet C	1	2	3	4	5	6	7	8	Final
(Manitoba) Matt Dunstone 🔨	0	3	0	1	3	1	X	X	8
(United States) Team Dropkin	0	0	2	0	0	0	X	X	2

Sheet D	1	2	3	4	5	6	7	8	Final
(Scotland) Bruce Mouat 🔨	3	0	4	0	3	X	X	X	10
(United States) Daniel Casper	0	2	0	1	0	X	X	X	3

==== Draw 6 ====
Wednesday, January 17, 12:00 pm

Sheet A	1	2	3	4	5	6	7	8	Final
(Alberta) Brendan Bottcher 🔨	0	2	0	1	0	1	1	2	7
(Switzerland) Michael Brunner	0	0	2	0	1	0	0	0	3

Sheet B	1	2	3	4	5	6	7	8	Final
(Newfoundland and Labrador) Brad Gushue 🔨	2	0	1	1	0	0	2	0	6
(Manitoba) Team Carruthers	0	4	0	0	0	1	0	2	7

Sheet C	1	2	3	4	5	6	7	8	Final
(Switzerland) Yannick Schwaller 🔨	2	0	2	0	1	0	2	X	7
(Saskatchewan) Mike McEwen	0	1	0	1	0	2	0	X	4

Sheet D	1	2	3	4	5	6	7	8	Final
(Scotland) Ross Whyte	2	1	0	0	3	0	1	X	7
(Norway) Magnus Ramsfjell 🔨	0	0	2	0	0	1	0	X	3

==== Draw 8 ====
Wednesday, January 17, 8:00 pm

Sheet A	1	2	3	4	5	6	7	8	Final
(Italy) Joël Retornaz 🔨	0	2	0	0	2	0	1	0	5
(United States) Daniel Casper	1	0	1	0	0	1	0	1	4

Sheet B	1	2	3	4	5	6	7	8	Final
(Sweden) Niklas Edin 🔨	2	0	0	0	1	0	0	X	3
(United States) Team Dropkin	0	2	0	2	0	0	2	X	6

Sheet C	1	2	3	4	5	6	7	8	Final
(Scotland) Bruce Mouat 🔨	1	0	3	0	2	3	X	X	9
(Scotland) James Craik	0	1	0	1	0	0	X	X	2

Sheet D	1	2	3	4	5	6	7	8	Final
(Manitoba) Matt Dunstone	0	0	0	2	0	2	0	X	4
(Alberta) Kevin Koe 🔨	0	2	1	0	2	0	2	X	6

==== Draw 10 ====
Thursday, January 18, 12:00 pm

Sheet A	1	2	3	4	5	6	7	8	Final
(Scotland) Bruce Mouat	0	3	1	0	0	1	1	X	6
(United States) Team Dropkin 🔨	1	0	0	0	2	0	0	X	3

Sheet B	1	2	3	4	5	6	7	8	Final
(Alberta) Kevin Koe 🔨	2	0	1	0	0	3	2	0	8
(United States) Daniel Casper	0	3	0	4	1	0	0	1	9

Sheet C	1	2	3	4	5	6	7	8	Final
(Italy) Joël Retornaz	0	0	1	0	0	1	0	X	2
(Manitoba) Matt Dunstone 🔨	0	2	0	0	2	0	1	X	5

Sheet D	1	2	3	4	5	6	7	8	Final
(Sweden) Niklas Edin	0	0	2	2	2	0	1	X	7
(Scotland) James Craik 🔨	2	0	0	0	0	1	0	X	3

==== Draw 12 ====
Thursday, January 18, 8:00 pm

Sheet A	1	2	3	4	5	6	7	8	Final
(Switzerland) Yannick Schwaller 🔨	2	2	0	3	0	0	0	1	8
(Manitoba) Team Carruthers	0	0	3	0	2	1	1	0	7

Sheet B	1	2	3	4	5	6	7	8	Final
(Norway) Magnus Ramsfjell	0	0	0	1	1	0	1	1	4
(Switzerland) Michael Brunner 🔨	0	1	1	0	0	1	0	0	3

Sheet C	1	2	3	4	5	6	7	8	Final
(Alberta) Brendan Bottcher	0	2	1	0	1	0	0	0	4
(Scotland) Ross Whyte 🔨	1	0	0	2	0	0	0	3	6

Sheet D	1	2	3	4	5	6	7	8	Final
(Newfoundland and Labrador) Brad Gushue	0	0	1	1	0	2	0	X	4
(Saskatchewan) Mike McEwen 🔨	0	0	0	0	0	0	1	X	1

==== Draw 13 ====
Friday, January 19, 8:30 am

Sheet A	1	2	3	4	5	6	7	8	Final
(Manitoba) Matt Dunstone	0	2	0	3	0	2	0	X	7
(United States) Daniel Casper 🔨	2	0	2	0	1	0	0	X	5

Sheet B	1	2	3	4	5	6	7	8	9	Final
(Scotland) Bruce Mouat 🔨	0	0	2	0	1	0	2	0	2	7
(Sweden) Niklas Edin	0	0	0	1	0	2	0	2	0	5

Sheet C	1	2	3	4	5	6	7	8	Final
(United States) Team Dropkin	0	0	1	0	0	0	0	X	1
(Scotland) James Craik 🔨	2	0	0	0	3	0	1	X	6

Sheet D	1	2	3	4	5	6	7	8	Final
(Italy) Joël Retornaz 🔨	3	2	0	2	1	X	X	X	8
(Alberta) Kevin Koe	0	0	2	0	0	X	X	X	2

==== Draw 15 ====
Friday, January 19, 4:00 pm

Sheet A	1	2	3	4	5	6	7	8	Final
(Scotland) Ross Whyte 🔨	2	1	0	2	1	1	X	X	7
(Switzerland) Michael Brunner	0	0	1	0	0	0	X	X	1

Sheet B	1	2	3	4	5	6	7	8	Final
(Switzerland) Yannick Schwaller 🔨	0	0	0	2	0	0	2	X	4
(Newfoundland and Labrador) Brad Gushue	1	0	0	0	0	1	0	X	2

Sheet C	1	2	3	4	5	6	7	8	Final
(Manitoba) Team Carruthers 🔨	0	1	0	2	0	1	0	0	4
(Saskatchewan) Mike McEwen	2	0	1	0	1	0	0	1	5

Sheet D	1	2	3	4	5	6	7	8	9	Final
(Alberta) Brendan Bottcher 🔨	0	2	0	1	0	0	1	0	1	5
(Norway) Magnus Ramsfjell	0	0	2	0	0	1	0	1	0	4

=== Tiebreaker ===
Saturday, January 20, 8:30 am

Sheet C	1	2	3	4	5	6	7	8	Final
(Newfoundland and Labrador) Brad Gushue 🔨	1	0	1	1	0	0	2	1	6
(Alberta) Kevin Koe	0	2	0	0	0	2	0	0	4

Player percentages
(Newfoundland and Labrador) Team Gushue		(Alberta) Team Koe	
Geoff Walker	92%	Karrick Martin	97%
E. J. Harnden	100%	Jacques Gauthier	84%
Mark Nichols	94%	Tyler Tardi	81%
Brad Gushue	94%	Kevin Koe	88%
Total	95%	Total	88%

=== Playoffs ===
Quarterfinals
1	(Switzerland) Yannick Schwaller	4
8	(Newfoundland and Labrador) Brad Gushue	6
4	(Alberta) Brendan Bottcher	7
5	(Manitoba) Matt Dunstone	3
2	(Scotland) Bruce Mouat	5
7	(Scotland) James Craik	4
3	(Scotland) Ross Whyte	5
6	(Italy) Joël Retornaz	4

Semifinals
8	(Newfoundland and Labrador) Brad Gushue	3
4	(Alberta) Brendan Bottcher	5
2	(Scotland) Bruce Mouat	5
3	(Scotland) Ross Whyte	3

Final
4	(Alberta) Brendan Bottcher	5
2	(Scotland) Bruce Mouat	6

==== Quarterfinals ====
Saturday, January 20, 12:00 pm

Sheet A	1	2	3	4	5	6	7	8	Final
(Scotland) Bruce Mouat 🔨	2	1	0	2	0	0	0	0	5
(Scotland) James Craik	0	0	1	0	0	1	1	1	4

Player percentages
(Scotland) Team Mouat		(Scotland) Team Craik	
Hammy McMillan Jr.	87%	Blair Haswell	81%
Bobby Lammie	84%	Angus Bryce	80%
Grant Hardie	83%	Mark Watt	84%
Bruce Mouat	88%	James Craik	84%
Total	85%	Total	82%

Sheet B	1	2	3	4	5	6	7	8	Final
(Scotland) Ross Whyte 🔨	1	0	0	0	2	0	2	0	5
(Italy) Joël Retornaz	0	1	0	0	0	2	0	1	4

Player percentages
(Scotland) Team Whyte		(Italy) Team Retornaz	
Euan Kyle	100%	Mattia Giovanella	94%
Duncan McFadzean	92%	Sebastiano Arman	91%
Robin Brydone	86%	Amos Mosaner	95%
Ross Whyte	94%	Joël Retornaz	88%
Total	93%	Total	92%

Sheet C	1	2	3	4	5	6	7	8	Final
(Alberta) Brendan Bottcher 🔨	1	0	0	3	0	0	3	X	7
(Manitoba) Matt Dunstone	0	1	0	0	2	0	0	X	3

Player percentages
(Alberta) Team Bottcher		(Manitoba) Team Dunstone	
Ben Hebert	95%	Ryan Harnden	82%
Brett Gallant	61%	Colton Lott	73%
Marc Kennedy	91%	B. J. Neufeld	91%
Brendan Bottcher	94%	Matt Dunstone	70%
Total	85%	Total	79%

Sheet D	1	2	3	4	5	6	7	8	Final
(Switzerland) Yannick Schwaller 🔨	1	0	1	0	0	2	0	X	4
(Newfoundland and Labrador) Brad Gushue	0	2	0	1	0	0	3	X	6

Player percentages
(Switzerland) Team Schwaller		(Newfoundland and Labrador) Team Gushue	
Pablo Lachat	92%	Geoff Walker	89%
Sven Michel	77%	E. J. Harnden	89%
Yannick Schwaller	80%	Mark Nichols	84%
Benoît Schwarz-van Berkel	83%	Brad Gushue	88%
Total	83%	Total	88%

==== Semifinals ====
Saturday, January 20, 8:00 pm

Sheet A	1	2	3	4	5	6	7	8	Final
(Newfoundland and Labrador) Brad Gushue	0	0	0	0	1	0	2	0	3
(Alberta) Brendan Bottcher 🔨	0	0	0	3	0	1	0	1	5

Player percentages
(Newfoundland and Labrador) Team Gushue		(Alberta) Team Bottcher	
Geoff Walker	92%	Ben Hebert	95%
E. J. Harnden	91%	Brett Gallant	95%
Mark Nichols	92%	Marc Kennedy	83%
Brad Gushue	86%	Brendan Bottcher	91%
Total	90%	Total	91%

Sheet D	1	2	3	4	5	6	7	8	Final
(Scotland) Bruce Mouat	0	1	0	1	0	2	0	1	5
(Scotland) Ross Whyte 🔨	0	0	1	0	1	0	1	0	3

Player percentages
(Scotland) Team Mouat		(Scotland) Team Whyte	
Hammy McMillan Jr.	92%	Euan Kyle	88%
Bobby Lammie	92%	Duncan McFadzean	91%
Grant Hardie	91%	Robin Brydone	92%
Bruce Mouat	86%	Ross Whyte	80%
Total	90%	Total	88%

==== Final ====
Sunday, January 21, 10:30 am

Sheet B	1	2	3	4	5	6	7	8	Final
(Alberta) Brendan Bottcher	0	2	0	0	1	0	1	1	5
(Scotland) Bruce Mouat 🔨	2	0	1	1	0	2	0	0	6

Player percentages
(Alberta) Team Bottcher		(Scotland) Team Mouat	
Ben Hebert	94%	Hammy McMillan Jr.	86%
Brett Gallant	92%	Bobby Lammie	81%
Marc Kennedy	92%	Grant Hardie	81%
Brendan Bottcher	73%	Bruce Mouat	95%
Total	88%	Total	86%

== Women ==
=== Teams ===
The teams are listed as follows:

Skip	Third	Second	Lead	Alternate	Locale
Chelsea Carey (Note: Chelsea Carey spared for Kate Cameron.)	Meghan Walter	Taylor McDonald	Mackenzie Elias		Winnipeg, Manitoba
Jolene Campbell	Abby Ackland	Rachel Erickson	Sara Oliver		Winnipeg, Manitoba
Kerri Einarson	Val Sweeting	Shannon Birchard	Briane Harris		Gimli, Manitoba
Satsuki Fujisawa	Chinami Yoshida	Yumi Suzuki	Yurika Yoshida		Kitami, Japan
Gim Eun-ji	Kim Min-ji	Kim Su-ji	Seol Ye-eun	Seol Ye-ji	Uijeongbu, South Korea
Anna Hasselborg	Sara McManus	Agnes Knochenhauer	Sofia Mabergs		Sundbyberg, Sweden
Rachel Homan	Tracy Fleury	Emma Miskew	Sarah Wilkes	Rachelle Brown	Ottawa, Ontario
Jennifer Jones	Karlee Burgess	Emily Zacharias	Lauren Lenentine		Winnipeg, Manitoba
Kim Eun-jung	Kim Kyeong-ae	Kim Cho-hi	Kim Seon-yeong	Kim Yeong-mi	Gangneung, South Korea
Kaitlyn Lawes	Selena Njegovan	Jocelyn Peterman	Kristin MacCuish		Winnipeg, Manitoba
Rebecca Morrison	Gina Aitken	Sophie Sinclair	Fay Henderson (Note: Fay Henderson spared for Jennifer Dodds who was serving as an Athlete Role Model at the 2024 Winter Youth Olympics. She played lead while alternate Sophie Sinclair played second and second Gina Aitken moved up to third.)	Sophie Jackson	Stirling, Scotland
Tabitha Peterson	Cory Thiesse	Tara Peterson	Becca Hamilton		(United States) St. Paul, Minnesota
Delaney Strouse	Anne O'Hara	Sydney Mullaney	Rebecca Rodgers	Susan Dudt	(United States) Traverse City, Michigan
Selena Sturmay	Danielle Schmiemann	Dezaray Hawes	Paige Papley		Edmonton, Alberta
Alina Pätz (Fourth)	Silvana Tirinzoni (Skip)	Selina Witschonke	Carole Howald		Aarau, Switzerland
Isabella Wranå	Almida de Val	Maria Larsson	Linda Stenlund		Sundbyberg, Sweden

=== Round robin standings ===
Final Round Robin Standings

Key
Teams to Playoffs
Teams to Tiebreaker

Pool A	W	L	PF	PA	SO
(Switzerland) Silvana Tirinzoni	4	0	27	12	9
(Japan) Satsuki Fujisawa	3	1	24	23	8
(Alberta) Selena Sturmay	1	3	17	23	4
(Manitoba) Jolene Campbell	0	4	15	28	11

Pool D	W	L	PF	PA	SO
(Manitoba) Kerri Einarson	4	0	28	17	15
(Manitoba) Jennifer Jones	2	2	27	19	7
(United States) Tabitha Peterson	2	2	22	19	10
(Scotland) Rebecca Morrison	0	4	13	32	14

Pool B	W	L	PF	PA	SO
(Ontario) Rachel Homan	3	1	26	15	6
(South Korea) Kim Eun-jung	3	1	26	15	12
(Sweden) Isabella Wranå	2	2	21	21	13
(United States) Delaney Strouse	0	4	12	35	16

Pool C	W	L	PF	PA	SO
(Sweden) Anna Hasselborg	4	0	27	17	1
(South Korea) Gim Eun-ji	3	1	27	15	3
(Manitoba) Kaitlyn Lawes	1	3	17	23	5
(Manitoba) Team Cameron	0	4	14	29	2

=== Round robin results ===
All draw times are listed in Mountain Time (UTC−07:00).

==== Draw 2 ====
Tuesday, January 16, 11:30 am

Sheet A	1	2	3	4	5	6	7	8	9	Final
(Sweden) Anna Hasselborg	1	0	0	0	1	0	0	2	1	5
(South Korea) Kim Eun-jung 🔨	0	0	1	1	0	1	1	0	0	4

Sheet B	1	2	3	4	5	6	7	8	Final
(Ontario) Rachel Homan	1	0	2	0	1	0	2	X	6
(Manitoba) Team Cameron 🔨	0	1	0	1	0	1	0	X	3

Sheet C	1	2	3	4	5	6	7	8	Final
(South Korea) Gim Eun-ji 🔨	0	3	2	0	0	3	X	X	8
(United States) Delaney Strouse	0	0	0	1	1	0	X	X	2

Sheet D	1	2	3	4	5	6	7	8	Final
(Sweden) Isabella Wranå 🔨	0	1	0	3	0	1	1	X	6
(Manitoba) Kaitlyn Lawes	0	0	1	0	2	0	0	X	3

==== Draw 4 ====
Tuesday, January 16, 6:30 pm

Sheet A	1	2	3	4	5	6	7	8	Final
(Manitoba) Jennifer Jones 🔨	2	0	1	1	0	2	0	X	6
(Alberta) Selena Sturmay	0	1	0	0	1	0	1	X	3

Sheet B	1	2	3	4	5	6	7	8	Final
(Switzerland) Silvana Tirinzoni	0	0	1	3	0	1	0	0	5
(Scotland) Rebecca Morrison 🔨	0	1	0	0	1	0	1	1	4

Sheet C	1	2	3	4	5	6	7	8	Final
(Japan) Satsuki Fujisawa 🔨	0	0	0	2	0	3	0	2	7
(United States) Tabitha Peterson	1	0	1	0	2	0	2	0	6

Sheet D	1	2	3	4	5	6	7	8	Final
(Manitoba) Kerri Einarson	0	0	3	0	2	1	0	1	7
(Manitoba) Jolene Campbell 🔨	0	1	0	2	0	0	2	0	5

==== Draw 5 ====
Wednesday, January 17, 8:30 am

Sheet A	1	2	3	4	5	6	7	8	Final
(Sweden) Isabella Wranå 🔨	0	2	0	3	5	0	X	X	10
(United States) Delaney Strouse	2	0	1	0	0	1	X	X	4

Sheet B	1	2	3	4	5	6	7	8	Final
(South Korea) Gim Eun-ji 🔨	1	0	0	3	0	0	2	0	6
(Sweden) Anna Hasselborg	0	1	1	0	2	1	0	2	7

Sheet C	1	2	3	4	5	6	7	8	Final
(Manitoba) Kaitlyn Lawes	0	2	0	2	0	3	0	X	7
(Manitoba) Team Cameron 🔨	1	0	1	0	2	0	1	X	5

Sheet D	1	2	3	4	5	6	7	8	Final
(Ontario) Rachel Homan	0	1	0	2	0	2	0	0	5
(South Korea) Kim Eun-jung 🔨	2	0	1	0	1	0	1	1	6

==== Draw 7 ====
Wednesday, January 17, 4:00 pm

Sheet A	1	2	3	4	5	6	7	8	Final
(Switzerland) Silvana Tirinzoni 🔨	2	0	4	0	0	2	1	X	9
(Manitoba) Jolene Campbell	0	1	0	2	1	0	0	X	4

Sheet B	1	2	3	4	5	6	7	8	Final
(Manitoba) Jennifer Jones	0	1	0	2	0	1	1	0	5
(United States) Tabitha Peterson 🔨	2	0	1	0	1	0	0	2	6

Sheet C	1	2	3	4	5	6	7	8	Final
(Manitoba) Kerri Einarson	0	2	0	2	0	4	1	X	9
(Scotland) Rebecca Morrison 🔨	2	0	1	0	1	0	0	X	4

Sheet D	1	2	3	4	5	6	7	8	Final
(Japan) Satsuki Fujisawa 🔨	2	0	2	0	0	3	3	X	10
(Alberta) Selena Sturmay	0	2	0	2	1	0	0	X	5

==== Draw 9 ====
Thursday, January 18, 8:30 am

Sheet A	1	2	3	4	5	6	7	8	Final
(Manitoba) Kerri Einarson	0	3	1	0	1	0	2	X	7
(United States) Tabitha Peterson 🔨	1	0	0	2	0	1	0	X	4

Sheet B	1	2	3	4	5	6	7	8	Final
(Alberta) Selena Sturmay 🔨	0	0	1	1	0	1	3	X	6
(Manitoba) Jolene Campbell	0	0	0	0	1	0	0	X	1

Sheet C	1	2	3	4	5	6	7	8	Final
(Switzerland) Silvana Tirinzoni 🔨	0	4	0	1	2	X	X	X	7
(Japan) Satsuki Fujisawa	0	0	1	0	0	X	X	X	1

Sheet D	1	2	3	4	5	6	7	8	Final
(Manitoba) Jennifer Jones 🔨	2	0	0	3	0	4	3	X	12
(Scotland) Rebecca Morrison	0	2	1	0	2	0	0	X	5

==== Draw 11 ====
Thursday, January 18, 4:00 pm

Sheet A	1	2	3	4	5	6	7	8	Final
(South Korea) Gim Eun-ji 🔨	1	1	2	0	1	0	1	X	6
(Manitoba) Kaitlyn Lawes	0	0	0	2	0	1	0	X	3

Sheet B	1	2	3	4	5	6	7	8	Final
(South Korea) Kim Eun-jung 🔨	1	0	0	4	0	2	2	X	9
(United States) Delaney Strouse	0	0	2	0	1	0	0	X	3

Sheet C	1	2	3	4	5	6	7	8	Final
(Ontario) Rachel Homan 🔨	1	0	0	0	2	0	0	4	7
(Sweden) Isabella Wranå	0	0	1	1	0	1	0	0	3

Sheet D	1	2	3	4	5	6	7	8	Final
(Sweden) Anna Hasselborg 🔨	3	0	1	0	2	1	2	X	9
(Manitoba) Team Cameron	0	2	0	1	0	0	0	X	3

==== Draw 14 ====
Friday, January 19, 12:00 pm

Sheet A	1	2	3	4	5	6	7	8	Final
(Japan) Satsuki Fujisawa	0	2	0	0	1	2	0	1	6
(Manitoba) Jolene Campbell 🔨	2	0	1	1	0	0	1	0	5

Sheet B	1	2	3	4	5	6	7	8	Final
(Manitoba) Kerri Einarson	0	2	0	0	0	3	0	0	5
(Manitoba) Jennifer Jones 🔨	2	0	0	0	1	0	0	1	4

Sheet C	1	2	3	4	5	6	7	8	Final
(United States) Tabitha Peterson 🔨	2	1	1	0	2	X	X	X	6
(Scotland) Rebecca Morrison	0	0	0	0	0	X	X	X	0

Sheet D	1	2	3	4	5	6	7	8	Final
(Switzerland) Silvana Tirinzoni	1	2	0	0	0	1	0	2	6
(Alberta) Selena Sturmay 🔨	0	0	1	1	0	0	1	0	3

==== Draw 16 ====
Friday, January 19, 8:00 pm

Sheet A	1	2	3	4	5	6	7	8	Final
(Ontario) Rachel Homan 🔨	0	2	0	3	0	2	1	X	8
(United States) Delaney Strouse	0	0	1	0	2	0	0	X	3

Sheet B	1	2	3	4	5	6	7	8	Final
(Sweden) Anna Hasselborg 🔨	2	0	2	0	1	1	0	X	6
(Manitoba) Kaitlyn Lawes	0	2	0	1	0	0	1	X	4

Sheet C	1	2	3	4	5	6	7	8	Final
(South Korea) Gim Eun-ji 🔨	2	3	0	0	2	0	X	X	7
(Manitoba) Team Cameron	0	0	1	1	0	1	X	X	3

Sheet D	1	2	3	4	5	6	7	8	Final
(Sweden) Isabella Wranå 🔨	0	0	0	0	2	0	0	X	2
(South Korea) Kim Eun-jung	0	1	1	1	0	1	3	X	7

=== Tiebreaker ===
Saturday, January 20, 8:30 am

Sheet A	1	2	3	4	5	6	7	8	Final
(Manitoba) Jennifer Jones 🔨	1	0	0	0	2	1	0	1	5
(United States) Tabitha Peterson	0	0	2	0	0	0	1	0	3

Player percentages
(Manitoba) Team Jones		(United States) Team Peterson	
Lauren Lenentine	94%	Becca Hamilton	91%
Emily Zacharias	83%	Tara Peterson	86%
Karlee Burgess	91%	Cory Thiesse	89%
Jennifer Jones	83%	Tabitha Peterson	78%
Total	88%	Total	86%

=== Playoffs ===
Quarterfinals
1	(Sweden) Anna Hasselborg	5
8	(Manitoba) Jennifer Jones	6
4	(South Korea) Gim Eun-ji	3
5	(Ontario) Rachel Homan	6
2	(Switzerland) Silvana Tirinzoni	8
7	(South Korea) Kim Eun-jung	5
3	(Manitoba) Kerri Einarson	5
6	(Japan) Satsuki Fujisawa	3

Semifinals
8	(Manitoba) Jennifer Jones	3
5	(Ontario) Rachel Homan	8
2	(Switzerland) Silvana Tirinzoni	6
3	(Manitoba) Kerri Einarson	5

Final
5	(Ontario) Rachel Homan	5
2	(Switzerland) Silvana Tirinzoni	4

==== Quarterfinals ====
Saturday, January 20, 4:00 pm

Sheet A	1	2	3	4	5	6	7	8	Final
(Manitoba) Kerri Einarson 🔨	2	0	1	0	0	0	0	2	5
(Japan) Satsuki Fujisawa	0	2	0	0	0	1	0	0	3

Player percentages
(Manitoba) Team Einarson		(Japan) Team Fujisawa	
Briane Harris	88%	Yurika Yoshida	88%
Shannon Birchard	86%	Yumi Suzuki	88%
Val Sweeting	92%	Chinami Yoshida	88%
Kerri Einarson	91%	Satsuki Fujisawa	92%
Total	89%	Total	88%

Sheet B	1	2	3	4	5	6	7	8	Final
(South Korea) Gim Eun-ji 🔨	1	0	0	1	0	0	1	0	3
(Ontario) Rachel Homan	0	2	1	0	0	1	0	2	6

Player percentages
(South Korea) Team Gim		(Ontario) Team Homan	
Seol Ye-eun	86%	Sarah Wilkes	70%
Kim Su-ji	69%	Emma Miskew	78%
Kim Min-ji	72%	Tracy Fleury	89%
Gim Eun-ji	66%	Rachel Homan	78%
Total	73%	Total	79%

Sheet C	1	2	3	4	5	6	7	8	Final
(Switzerland) Silvana Tirinzoni 🔨	0	2	0	3	0	1	0	2	8
(South Korea) Kim Eun-jung	0	0	1	0	2	0	2	0	5

Player percentages
(Switzerland) Team Tirinzoni		(South Korea) Team Kim	
Carole Howald	92%	Kim Seon-yeong	97%
Selina Witschonke	86%	Kim Cho-hi	83%
Silvana Tirinzoni	92%	Kim Kyeong-ae	84%
Alina Pätz	94%	Kim Eun-jung	81%
Total	91%	Total	86%

Sheet D	1	2	3	4	5	6	7	8	9	Final
(Sweden) Anna Hasselborg 🔨	1	0	0	1	1	0	1	1	0	5
(Manitoba) Jennifer Jones	0	2	1	0	0	2	0	0	1	6

Player percentages
(Sweden) Team Hasselborg		(Manitoba) Team Jones	
Sofia Mabergs	92%	Lauren Lenentine	90%
Agnes Knochenhauer	72%	Emily Zacharias	82%
Sara McManus	85%	Karlee Burgess	88%
Anna Hasselborg	65%	Jennifer Jones	74%
Total	78%	Total	83%

==== Semifinals ====
Saturday, January 20, 8:00 pm

Sheet B	1	2	3	4	5	6	7	8	Final
(Switzerland) Silvana Tirinzoni 🔨	3	0	0	0	1	0	0	2	6
(Manitoba) Kerri Einarson	0	3	0	1	0	1	0	0	5

Player percentages
(Switzerland) Team Tirinzoni		(Manitoba) Team Einarson	
Carole Howald	94%	Briane Harris	97%
Selina Witschonke	83%	Shannon Birchard	88%
Silvana Tirinzoni	83%	Val Sweeting	88%
Alina Pätz	83%	Kerri Einarson	73%
Total	86%	Total	86%

Sheet C	1	2	3	4	5	6	7	8	Final
(Manitoba) Jennifer Jones	0	2	0	0	1	0	X	X	3
(Ontario) Rachel Homan 🔨	3	0	1	2	0	2	X	X	8

Player percentages
(Manitoba) Team Jones		(Ontario) Team Homan	
Lauren Lenentine	92%	Sarah Wilkes	79%
Emily Zacharias	75%	Emma Miskew	73%
Karlee Burgess	71%	Tracy Fleury	96%
Jennifer Jones	58%	Rachel Homan	77%
Total	74%	Total	81%

==== Final ====
Sunday, January 21, 3:00 pm

Sheet B	1	2	3	4	5	6	7	8	9	Final
(Ontario) Rachel Homan	0	1	0	0	1	0	0	2	1	5
(Switzerland) Silvana Tirinzoni 🔨	0	0	1	0	0	2	1	0	0	4

Player percentages
(Ontario) Team Homan		(Switzerland) Team Tirinzoni	
Sarah Wilkes	86%	Carole Howald	89%
Emma Miskew	93%	Selina Witschonke	86%
Tracy Fleury	85%	Silvana Tirinzoni	86%
Rachel Homan	90%	Alina Pätz	86%
Total	89%	Total	87%
