= Canyon Ski Area =

Ski resort in Alberta, Canada

Canyon Ski Resort

- Location within Alberta Location within Canada
- Location: Red Deer County, Alberta, Canada
- Nearest city: Red Deer
- Coordinates: 52°18′26.6″N 113°41′07.7″W
- Top elevation: 899 m (2,949 ft)
- Base elevation: 753 m (2,470 ft)
- Skiable area: 0.32 km^{2} (0.12 sq mi)
- Trails: 23 (26 % novice, 30% intermediate, 30% expert, 14% mixed)
- Longest run: 1,291 m (4,236 ft)
- Lift system: 6 (2 chairlifts, 4 surface lifts)
- Snowfall: 114 cm (45 in)
- Website: Canyon Ski Resort

Canyon Ski Resort is located on the banks of the Red Deer River. It is located 9 km east of Red Deer, Alberta, Canada, along the David Thompson Highway.

It has one triple chair, one double chair, two T-bars, a platter tow and a tube tow. Some of its main runs are the Powderhorn, Holiday, and Sun Deck. It has a single double black diamond, known as Karl's Mistaake. The resort also hosts a snowboard Terrain Park and Super Pipe run. The vertical drop is 146 m (480 ft).

The main lodge is at the base of the ski runs and is located in a river valley, at the upper end of a steep road. The upper lift stations are at the top of the river valley, in relatively flat prairie farmland.

Canyon Ski Resort was one of the first Canadian ski hills to use artificial snow-making equipment in the 1960s. As a result of this and relatively cold fall temperatures in central Alberta, it was reliably one of the first ski areas to open in Canada. Consequently, the Canadian National Ski team used Canyon Ski Resort for its early season training in the 1960s. Canyon Ski Resort hosted the alpine skiing, freestyle skiing, and snowboarding events for the 2019 Canada Winter Games.

In July 2025, Canyon Ski Resort was featured in the premiere episode of The Amazing Race Canada Season 11, titled "Canada Is Something Special". The episode aired on July 8, 2025, and included several stops throughout Red Deer, Alberta. At Canyon, teams were required to ride the Canyon Coaster and correctly guess the duration of their ride within two seconds to receive their next clue. The task highlighted the resort's summer operations and its status as home to Alberta's first mountain coaster. The episode also featured other local landmarks such as The Silver Buckle and Fort Normandeau.

This ski resort offers runs for beginners to experienced skiers, including a "Bunny Hill" or beginners hill for young children.

In recent years, Canyon Ski Resort began offering summer attractions. These include an Alpine Coaster, Summer Tubing, an Aerial Park and Zip-Line, as well as a Bungee Trampoline.
