= Joshua Roy =

Canadian ice hockey player (born 2003)

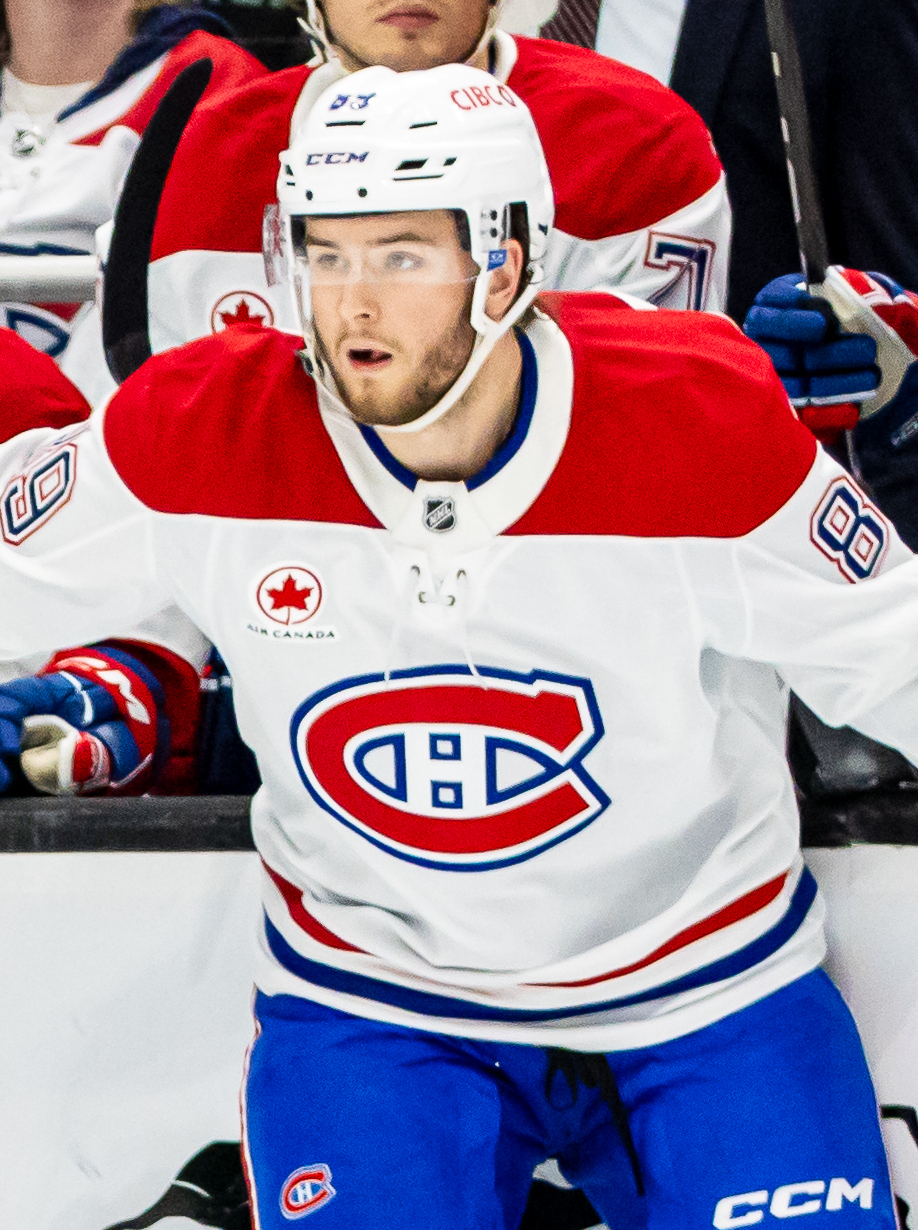
- Roy with the Montreal Canadiens in 2025
- Born: August 6, 2003 (age 23) Saint-Georges, Quebec, Canada
- Height: 6 ft 0 in (183 cm)
- Weight: 192 lb (87 kg; 13 st 10 lb)
- Position: Forward
- Shoots: Left
- NHL team (P) Cur. team Former teams: Utah Mammoth; Tucson Roadrunners (AHL); Montreal Canadiens
- NHL draft: 150th overall, 2021; Montreal Canadiens
- Playing career: 2022–present

Joshua Roy (born August 6, 2003) is a Canadian professional ice hockey player who is a forward for the Tucson Roadrunners in the American Hockey League (AHL) while under contract to the Utah Mammoth of the National Hockey League (NHL).

A highly touted prospect upon entering the Quebec Major Junior Hockey League (QMJHL) with the Saint John Sea Dogs, early struggles led to a decline in his reputation, and he was ultimately selected by the Montreal Canadiens in the fifth round (150th overall) of the 2021 NHL entry draft. Following a trade to the Sherbrooke Phoenix, Roy would see a substantial increase in his production, winning the Jean Béliveau Trophy as the league's top scorer for the 2021–22 season.

Internationally, Roy was part of the Canadian national junior team that won gold medals at both the 2022 and 2023 iterations of the World Junior Championships.

== Playing career ==
=== Junior ===
After a highly successful 2018–19 minor hockey season with the Lévis Chevaliers of the Quebec Junior AAA Hockey League (QMAAA), in which he set a franchise record for scoring as well as led the league in total points (88), Roy was selected first overall in the Quebec Major Junior Hockey League (QMJHL) entry draft by the Saint John Sea Dogs. Self-described as "not a physical guy really, more a skilled guy. Won't be making a lot of checks," Roy was compared to Sea Dogs alumni Jonathan Huberdeau by team management. Conversely, The Hockey News faulted the former's performance, writing that "despite posting 11 points in 11 playoff games, Roy left a lot to be desired and wasn't as competitive shift-to-shift as you'd like to see." Making his QMJHL debut in the 2019–20 season, he appeared in 60 games before the onset of the COVID-19 pandemic curtailed the remainder of league play. At this juncture, Roy had 16 goals and 28 assists.

At the beginning of the 2020–21 season, the NHL Central Scouting Bureau rated Roy as a B-grade prospect, making him a candidate for selection in either the second or third round of the annual NHL entry draft. He played 15 games with the Sea Dogs, registering nine goals and eight assists, before a shutdown of the team because of COVID-19 pandemic outbreaks in New Brunswick that would last for almost four months. Roy struggled with the effects of the lockdown, ultimately requesting a trade, and, in advance of the 2021 trade deadline, was dealt to the Sherbrooke Phoenix. He appeared in 16 games with the Phoenix, posting nine goals and 5 assists, second on the team in that timeframe. Despite the late change, NHL scouting assessments of Roy were negatively affected by his first two QMJHL seasons, and he was ultimately taken in the fifth round of the 2021 draft by the Montreal Canadiens. Thereafter, Canadiens scouting director Trevor Timmins said that the team felt "he's going to be a late bloomer."

During the 2021 offseason, the Phoenix and Canadiens development staff collaboratively developed a program to address concerns about Roy's underlying training and conditioning. With this, he enjoyed a breakout 2021–22 season, posting 51 goals and 68 assists for a league-best 119 points in 66 games. He won the Jean Béliveau Trophy as the QMJHL's top scorer and was named to the First All-Star Team. The league also awarded him the Paul Dumont Trophy as the personality of the year, citing his status as "an important ambassador for the QMJHL" and "his positive impact in media circles." He was likewise a finalist for both the Frank J. Selke Memorial Trophy, awarded to the most sportsmanlike player, and the Michel Brière Memorial Trophy, awarded to the QMJHL's most valuable player. In the ensuing 2022 QMJHL playoffs, the Phoenix reached the semi-finals, before being ousted by the Charlottetown Islanders.

During his penultimate major junior campaign, Roy signed a three-year entry-level contract with the Canadiens on March 30, 2022. Following the QMJHL playoffs, he was eligible to be called up to play for the Canadiens' American Hockey League (AHL) affiliate Laval Rocket in the Calder Cup playoffs. He appeared in one game in the Eastern Conference Finals.

Returning to the Phoenix for the 2022–23 season, Roy soon received advice from Canadiens player development director Adam Nicholas that emphasized how to "build NHL habits to be a good NHL player." This included greater emphasis on physical play and entering "high danger" areas for generating offense. He appeared in only 55 regular-season games for the Phoenix that season, as a result of participating in the 2023 IIHF World Junior Championship, registering 46 goals and 53 assists and tied for seventh in league scoring. He received his second Dumont Trophy and second First All-Star Team designation, and was a finalist for the Brière Trophy for a second time. Roy and the Phoenix reached the playoff semi-finals for the second consecutive season, but were defeated by the Halifax Mooseheads.

=== Professional ===
After what was generally judged a successful time in the Canadiens' prospect camp, including leading the team in scoring at a rookie showcase tournament in Buffalo, Roy was assigned to the AHL ranks for Laval's respective training camp in October 2023. During his regular season debut with the Rocket, Roy registered a goal and an assist in a 7–3 loss to the Abbotsford Canucks. He repeated this performance in the team's second game against the Canucks, attracting immediate positive commentary. On October 20, he scored his first AHL hat-trick against the Rochester Americans, also managing two assists in the game. For his efforts, Roy was subsequently named as the league's Rookie of the Month, having recorded five goals and seven assists through his first seven professional games. He went on to record 12 goals and 18 assists through 34 AHL games played, before being called up to make his NHL debut with the Canadiens on January 13, 2024, following an injury to Josh Anderson. Roy scored his first NHL goal thereafter on January 17, a 3–2 victory over the New Jersey Devils. After six games, he returned to the AHL, having had a goal and an assist in that span. He was recalled again on February 10 following an injury to Rafaël Harvey-Pinard. Despite suffering an upper body injury in March, Roy returned in mid-April, and was one of four players reassigned to Laval to end the season.

On October 7, Roy was again reassigned to the Rocket to begin the 2024–25 season after what had been considered an underwhelming preseason performance with the Canadiens. Initially posting 16 points through 17 games played with Laval, Roy was recalled by Montreal on November 25. Following a four-game stint with the Canadiens, he was reassigned to Laval on December 2. In early 2025, Roy was named to the AHL All-Star Classic for the first time in his career. However, in a game versus the Utica Comets just days later, he would suffer an upper-body injury, sidelining him for four to six weeks as a result.

Following three full seasons within the Canadiens organization, Roy was traded to the Utah Mammoth in exchange for defenceman Maksymilian Szuber on June 29, 2026. As a restricted free agent, he immediately agreed to terms with the Mammoth on a one-year, two-way contract the following day.

== International play ==
Medal record

Men's ice hockey

Representing Canada

World Junior Championships
Gold medal – first place	2023 Canada	
Gold medal – first place	2022 Canada	

Canada Winter Games
Gold medal – first place	2019 Canada	

Early into his junior career, Roy was a member of Team Quebec at the 2019 Canada Winter Games, capturing a gold medal. Thereafter, he participated in the annual World U-17 Hockey Challenge, managing two goals and two assists in five games with Canada Red.

Following a disappointing first two seasons in the QMJHL, Roy was not invited to the preliminary summer selection process for the Canadian national junior team in advance of the 2022 World Junior Ice Hockey Championships. After showing signs of early improvement with the Phoenix, he was a late addition to the fall selection camps and one of the final players cut before the official announcement of the team's roster. Following the suspension of the foregoing tournament as a result of the Omicron variant, Roy would be called upon when the event was rescheduled for August of that year. He recorded three goals and five assists in seven games, winning a gold medal. Utilized primarily on a "shutdown line", Roy indicated that he "was very happy with how I played."

Roy rejoined Team Canada for the 2023 World Junior Ice Hockey Championships, initially assigned to play with fellow QMJHL forwards Nathan Gaucher and Zach Dean on a line that proved very successful in exhibition play. However, after the team opened the tournament with a loss to Czechia, the forward lines were reorganized, with Roy joining Logan Stankoven and Connor Bedard. The Bedard-Stankoven-Roy line became the backbone of the team through the rest of the tournament, and the three were named Team Canada's three best players following the semi-final victory over Team USA in which they scored four of Canada's six goals. In the tournament final, Canada faced a rematch with Czechia, prevailing to win a second consecutive gold medal. Roy had the primary assist on Dylan Guenther's golden goal in overtime.

== Career statistics ==
=== Regular season and playoffs ===
			Regular season					Playoffs
Season	Team	League	GP	G	A	Pts	PIM	GP	G	A	Pts	PIM
2018–19	Lévis Chevaliers	QMAAA	42	38	50	88	6	11	6	5	11	0
2019–20	Saint John Sea Dogs	QMJHL	60	16	28	44	6	—	—	—	—	—
2020–21	Saint John Sea Dogs	QMJHL	15	9	8	17	2	—	—	—	—	—
2020–21	Sherbrooke Phoenix	QMJHL	20	13	5	18	2	3	1	3	4	2
2021–22	Sherbrooke Phoenix	QMJHL	66	51	68	119	22	11	8	15	23	0
2021–22	Laval Rocket	AHL	—	—	—	—	—	1	0	0	0	0
2022–23	Sherbrooke Phoenix	QMJHL	55	46	53	99	14	14	12	12	24	2
2023–24	Laval Rocket	AHL	41	13	19	32	12	—	—	—	—	—
2023–24	Montreal Canadiens	NHL	23	4	5	9	0	—	—	—	—	—
2024–25	Montreal Canadiens	NHL	12	2	0	2	2	—	—	—	—	—
2024–25	Laval Rocket	AHL	47	20	15	35	10	13	4	6	10	18
2025–26	Laval Rocket	AHL	57	23	22	45	32	5	2	0	2	18
2025–26	Montreal Canadiens	NHL	3	0	0	0	2	—	—	—	—	—
NHL totals			38	6	5	11	4	—	—	—	—	—

=== International ===
Year	Team	Event	Result	GP	G	A	Pts	PIM
2019	Quebec	CWG	1st place, gold medalist(s)	6	4	9	13	0
2019	Canada Red	U17	5th	5	2	2	4	6
2022	Canada	WJC	1st place, gold medalist(s)	7	3	5	8	2
2023	Canada	WJC	1st place, gold medalist(s)	7	5	6	11	0
Junior totals				19	10	13	23	8

== Awards and honours ==
Award	Year	Ref
QMAAA
Most Valuable Player	2019	
Top Prospect Award	2019	
QMJHL
Jean Béliveau Trophy	2022	
Paul Dumont Trophy	2022, 2023	
First All-Star Team	2022, 2023	
AHL
Rookie of the Month (October 2023)	2023	
All-Star Game	2025	
