= Graham Ritchie =

Canadian cross-country skier (born 1998)

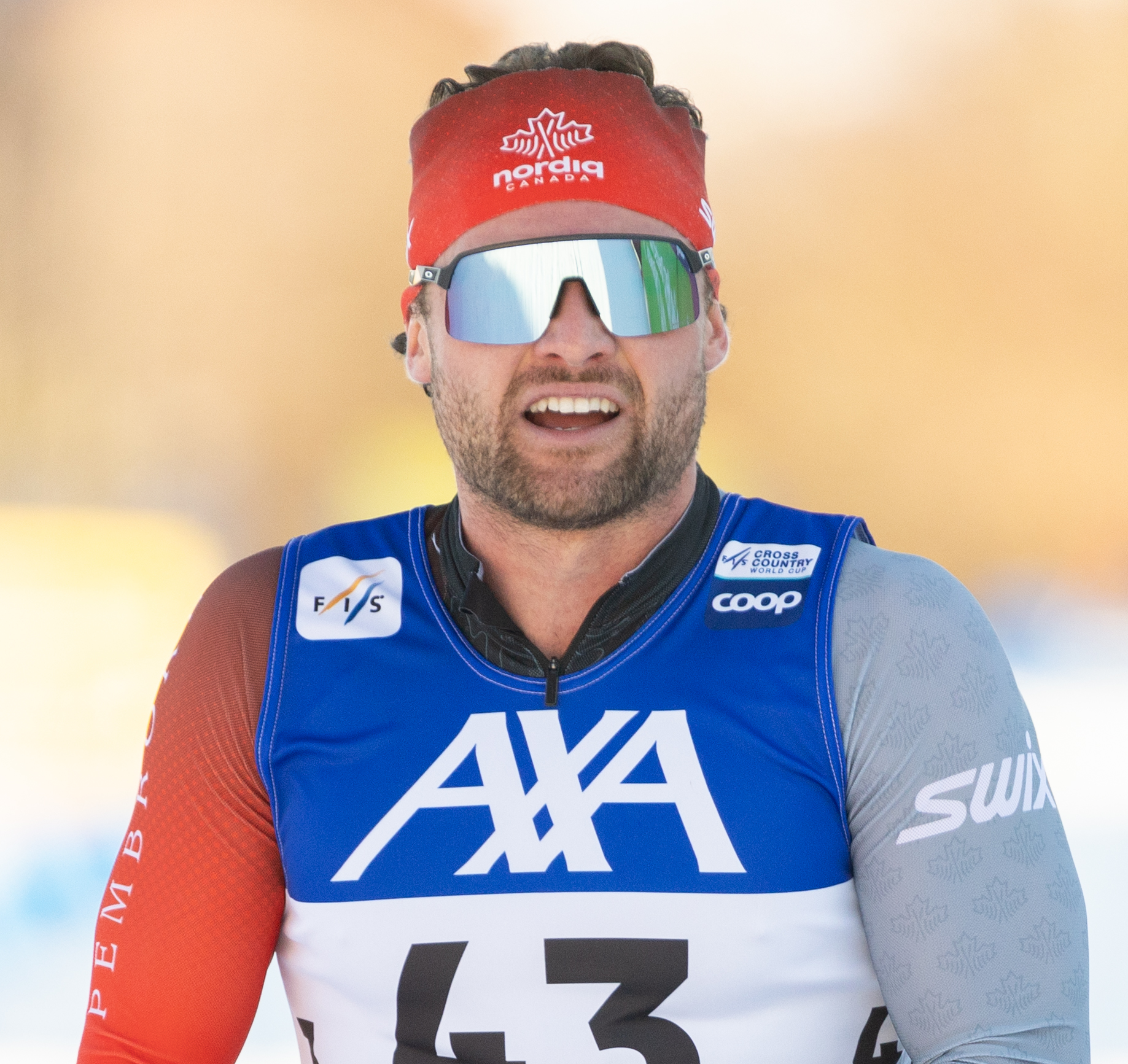

Personal information
- Nationality: Canada
- Born: 23 September 1998 (age 28) Parry Sound, Ontario, Canada

Sport
- Sport: Skiing
- Club: Georgian Nordic

World Cup career
- Seasons: 5 – (2019–present)
- Indiv. starts: 34
- Indiv. podiums: 0
- Team starts: 6
- Team podiums: 0
- Overall titles: 0 – (80th in 2022)
- Discipline titles: 0
- Updated on 29 March 2023

Graham Ritchie (born 23 September 1998) is a Canadian cross-country skier. Ritchie trains as part of the National Team Development Centre Thunder Bay team.

== Career ==
Graham trained with the National Training Development Centre (NTDC) in Thunder Bay, Ontario, while beginning a career in the outdoors industry as a sales representative and equipment technician at Rollin' Thunder Bike, Board, and Ski.

Ritchie made his World Cup debut in 2019 at the World Cup Finals in Quebec City.

During the 2020–21 FIS Cross-Country World Cup's Ulricehamn stop, Ritchie had a career best 17th-place finish in the freestyle sprint event.

At the FIS Nordic World Ski Championships 2021, Ritchie, along with partner Antoine Cyr, placed in seventh place during the team sprint event. They were the youngest team in the final.

On January 13, 2022, Ritchie was officially named to Canada's 2022 Olympic team.

== Cross-country skiing results ==
All results are sourced from the International Ski Federation (FIS).

=== Olympic Games ===
Year	Age	15 km individual	30 km skiathlon	50 km mass start	Sprint	4 × 10 km relay	Team sprint
2022	23	—	—	—	34	11	5

=== World Championships ===
Year	Age	15 km individual	30 km skiathlon	50 km mass start	Sprint	4 × 10 km relay	Team sprint
2021	22	67	—	—	34	10	7
2023	24	46	—	—	20	5	4

=== World Cup ===
==== Season standings ====
Season	Age	Discipline standings				Ski Tour standings			
Season	Age	Overall	Distance	Sprint	U23	Nordic Opening	Tour de Ski	Ski Tour 2020	World Cup Final
2019	20	NC	NC	NC	NC	—	—	—N/a	DNF
2020	21	NC	—	NC	NC	—	—	—	—N/a
2021	22	91	82	62	12	—	—	—N/a	—N/a
2022	23	80	78	46	—N/a	—N/a	—	—N/a	—N/a
2023	24	81	76	52	—N/a	—N/a	DNF	—N/a	—N/a
