= Antoine Cyr =

Canadian cross-country skier (born 1998)

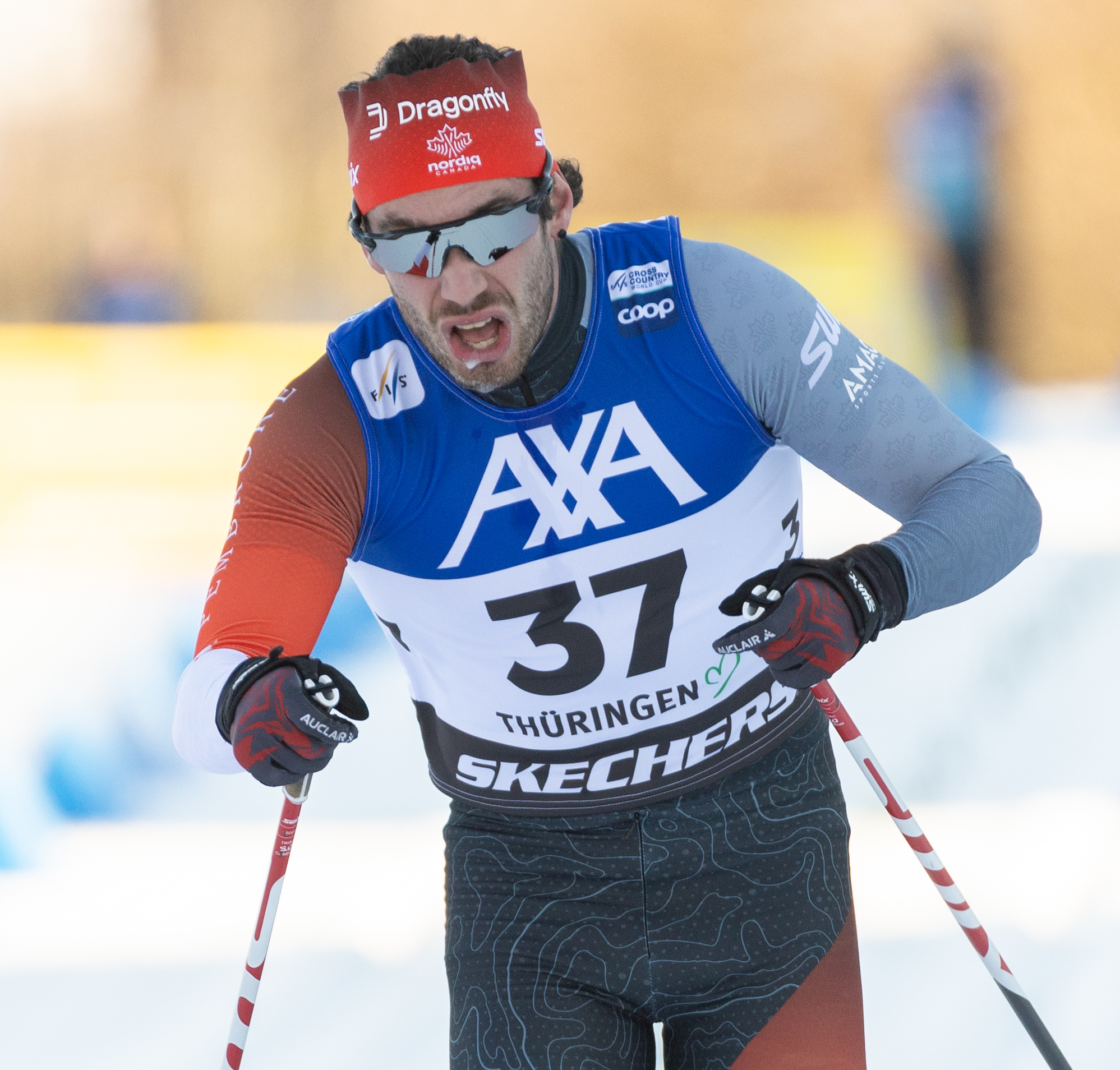

Personal information
- Nationality: Canada
- Born: 18 September 1998 (age 28) Gatineau, Quebec, Canada

Sport
- Sport: Skiing
- Club: Club Skinouk

World Cup career
- Seasons: 5 – (2019–present)
- Indiv. starts: 58
- Indiv. podiums: 0
- Team starts: 8
- Team podiums: 0
- Overall titles: 0 – (10th in 2024)
- Discipline titles: 0
- Updated on 7 January 2024

Antoine Cyr (born 18 September 1998) is a Canadian cross-country skier. Cyr started skiing at a young age, as both of his parents were also cross-country skiers.

== Career ==
At the FIS Nordic World Ski Championships 2021, Cyr, along with partner Graham Ritchie, placed in seventh place during the team sprint event. They were the youngest team in the final. At the start of the 2021–22 FIS Cross-Country World Cup, Cyr had two top 15 finishes, finishing in 11th and 12th during races of the first World Cup stop.

In January 2022, Cyr won the sprint race as part of the Canadian Championships, which confirmed his automatic qualification to Canada's 2022 Olympic team. On January 13, 2022, Cyr was officially named to Canada's 2022 Olympic team.

On December 19, 2025, Cyr was named to Canada's 2026 Olympic Team.

== Cross-country skiing results ==
All results are sourced from the International Ski Federation (FIS).

=== Olympic Games ===
Year	Age	15 km individual	30 km skiathlon	50 km mass start	Sprint	4 × 10 km relay	Team sprint
2022	23	37	42	—	56	11	5

=== World Championships ===
Year	Age	15 km individual	30 km skiathlon	50 km mass start	Sprint	4 × 10 km relay	Team sprint
2021	22	—	27	27	31	10	7
2023	24	—	DNF	36	38	5	4

=== World Cup ===
==== Season standings ====
Season	Age	Discipline standings				Ski Tour standings			
Season	Age	Overall	Distance	Sprint	U23	Nordic Opening	Tour de Ski	Ski Tour 2020	World Cup Final
2019	20	NC	NC	NC	NC	—	—	—N/a	61
2020	21	NC	—	NC	NC	—	—	—	—N/a
2021	22	93	62	NC	13	—	—	—N/a	—N/a
2022	23	54	34	67	—N/a	—N/a	—	—N/a	—N/a
2023	24	24	20	35	—N/a	—N/a	16	—N/a	—N/a
2024	25	10	18	26	—N/a	—N/a	12	—N/a	—N/a
