= Aiden Williams =

American football player (born 2000)

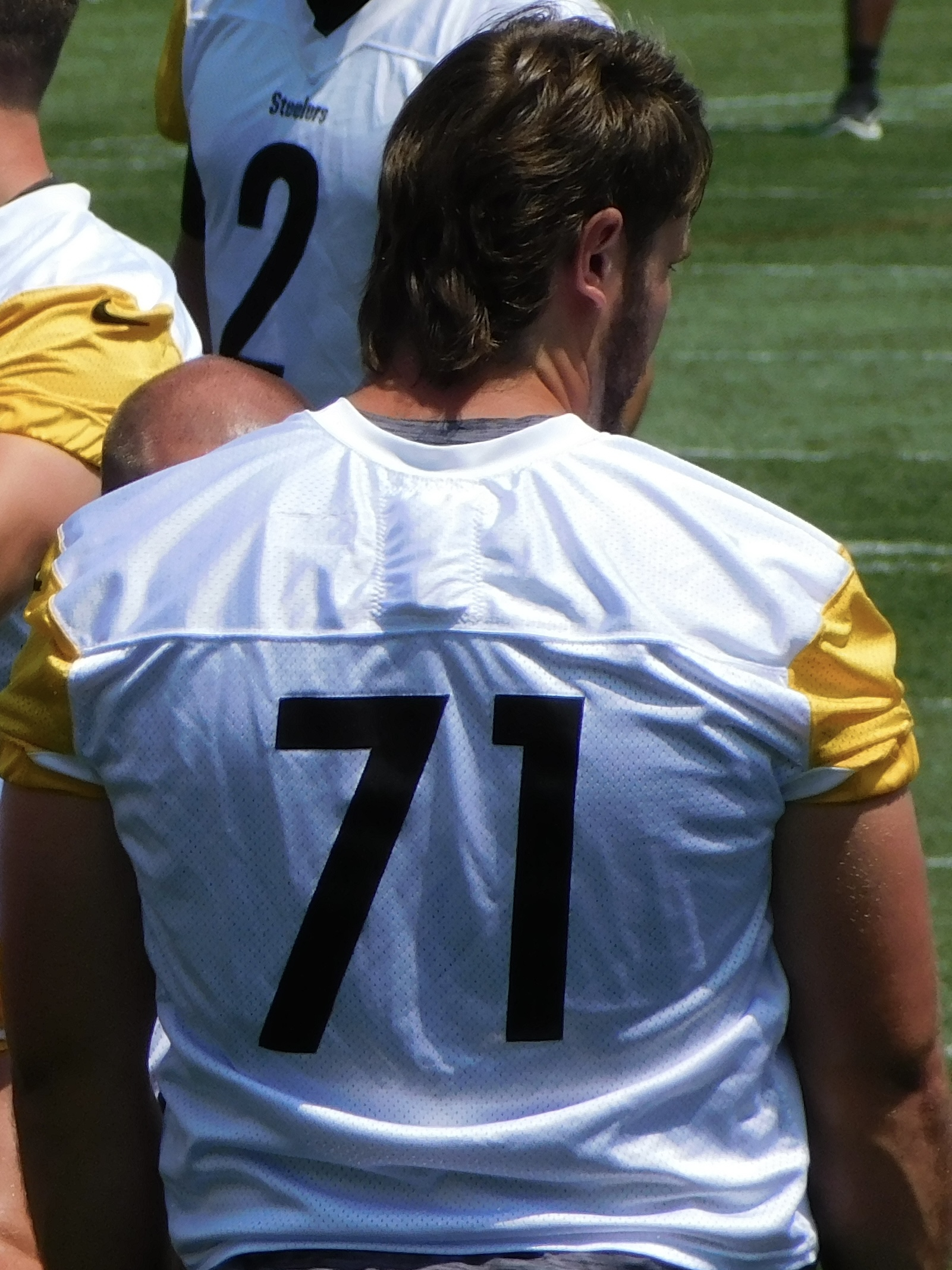
- Williams with the Pittsburgh Steelers in 2025

Profile
- Position: Guard

Personal information
- Born: August 31, 2000 (age 26); Anchorage, Alaska, U.S.
- Listed height: 6 ft 6 in (1.98 m)
- Listed weight: 314 lb (142 kg)

Career information
- High school: Bettye Davis East Anchorage
- College: Minnesota Duluth (2019–2024)
- NFL draft: 2025: undrafted

Career history
- Pittsburgh Steelers (2025)*; Carolina Panthers (2025)*; Pittsburgh Steelers (2026)*
- * Offseason or practice squad member only

Awards and highlights
- 2× Second-team All-NSIC (2022, 2023)

Career NFL statistics as of 2025
- Games played: 0
- Games started: 0
- Stats at Pro Football Reference

Aiden Williams (born August 31, 2000) is an American professional football guard. He played college football for the UMD Bulldogs.

== Early life ==
At East Anchorage High School, he was best friends with Morgan Walker. He started for two seasons in multiple roles, including tight end, defensive end, and long snapper, playing for head coach Jeff Trotter. In 2018, he repeated as a recipient of statewide and regional football honors from the Alaska Football Coaches Association, KTUU-TV, USA Today's Alaska list, and the Cook Inlet Conference. He also played four years on the varsity basketball team, contributing as a center and power forward. A National Honor Society student, he became the first athlete from Alaska to join the Bulldog football team.

== College career ==
Williams redshirted in 2019. He did not play in 2020 due to the season being canceled by the COVID-19 pandemic. In 2021, he appeared in five games. During the 2022 season, he played in 10 games and contributed to an offense that ranked in the national top 20 in time of possession, rushing offense, passing efficiency, and third down percentage. He was named to the All-NSIC Second Team Offense. In 2023, he again earned All-NSIC Second Team Offense honors and was part of a rushing offense that led the NSIC and ranked seventh nationally, averaging 243.8 yards per game. He started every game through the 2024 season, during which, he received an invite to the East-West Shrine Bowl.

== Professional career ==
Pre-draft measurables
Height	Weight	Arm length	Hand span	Wingspan	40-yard dash	10-yard split	20-yard split	20-yard shuttle	Three-cone drill	Vertical jump	Broad jump	Bench press
6 ft 5 3/4 in (1.97 m)	315 lb (143 kg)	32 3/4 in (0.83 m)	10 in (0.25 m)	6 ft 7 1/8 in (2.01 m)	5.17 s	1.75 s	2.97 s	4.63 s	7.58 s	30.0 in (0.76 m)	8 ft 10 in (2.69 m)	27 reps
All values from Pro Day

=== Pittsburgh Steelers ===
In the 2025 NFL draft, Williams went undrafted and was signed by the Pittsburgh Steelers. He was waived on August 25. Williams was re-signed to the practice squad on August 28 but waived on September 3.

=== Carolina Panthers ===
On October 1, 2025, Williams signed with the Carolina Panthers' practice squad. He was released by Carolina on October 7.

=== Pittsburgh Steelers (second stint) ===
On January 14, 2026, Williams signed a reserve/futures contract with the Pittsburgh Steelers. He was released by the Steelers on June 11.
