= Colton Dach =

Canadian ice hockey player (born 2003)

- Born: January 4, 2003 (age 23) St. Albert, Alberta, Canada
- Height: 6 ft 3 in (191 cm)
- Weight: 215 lb (98 kg; 15 st 5 lb)
- Position: Centre
- Shoots: Left
- NHL team Former teams: Edmonton Oilers; Chicago Blackhawks
- NHL draft: 62nd overall, 2021; Chicago Blackhawks
- Playing career: 2023–present

Colton Dach (born January 4, 2003) is a Canadian professional ice hockey player who is a centre for the Edmonton Oilers of the National Hockey League (NHL). He was selected in the second round, 62nd overall, by the Chicago Blackhawks in the 2021 NHL entry draft.

== Early life ==
Dach was born January 4, 2003, in St. Albert, Alberta, to parents Dale and Hillary. He began playing ice hockey with his brother, practicing in a backyard rink and on Garner Lake near his family's cabin. A childhood fan of the Edmonton Oilers of the National Hockey League (NHL), he would frequently attend games at Rexall Place with his father.

== Playing career ==
=== Chicago Blackhawks (2025–2026) ===
On January 3, 2025, Dach made his NHL debut against the Montreal Canadiens, which Chicago won 4-2. On January 8, Dach recorded his first point, an assist, in an eventual 3-1 win over the Colorado Avalanche. He scored his first goal on January 24, against the Tampa Bay Lightning.

=== Edmonton Oilers (2026–present) ===
On March 4, 2026, Dach was traded to the Edmonton Oilers alongside Jason Dickinson in exchange for Andrew Mangiapane and a conditional first-round pick in the 2027 NHL entry draft.

As a restricted free agent, Dach was re-signed by the Oilers to a two-year, $2.4 million contract extension on July 12, 2026.

== International play ==
Medal record

Men's ice hockey

Representing Canada

World Junior Championships
Gold medal – first place	2023 Canada	

Canada Winter Games
Bronze medal – third place	2019 Canada	

Early into his junior career, Dach was a member of Team Alberta at the 2019 Canada Winter Games, earning a bronze medal. Thereafter, he joined the Canadian national junior team in advance of the 2023 World Junior Ice Hockey Championships. Registering two points through four contests, Dach would suffer an injury in his country's final group stage game, sidlelining him for the remainder of tournament play. Canada would ultimately go on to defeat Czechia in overtime to capture a gold medal.

== Personal life ==
Dach's older brother, Kirby, is also a professional ice hockey player. Selected third overall by the Blackhawks in the 2019 NHL entry draft, Kirby currently plays for the Montreal Canadiens.

Dach is also a maternal cousin of Keaton Verhoeff, who was selected ninth overall by the San Jose Sharks in the 2026 NHL Entry Draft. Verhoeff currently plays for the North Dakota Fighting Hawks.

== Career statistics ==
=== Regular season and playoffs ===
			Regular season					Playoffs
Season	Team	League	GP	G	A	Pts	PIM	GP	G	A	Pts	PIM
2018–19	Fort Saskatchewan Rangers	AMHL	32	16	12	28	26	8	3	4	7	6
2019–20	Saskatoon Blades	WHL	62	11	18	29	45	—	—	—	—	—
2020–21	Saskatoon Blades	WHL	20	11	9	20	16	—	—	—	—	—
2021–22	Kelowna Rockets	WHL	61	29	50	79	53	5	0	0	0	4
2022–23	Kelowna Rockets	WHL	14	9	8	17	23	—	—	—	—	—
2022–23	Seattle Thunderbirds	WHL	9	3	7	10	8	19	3	11	14	20
2023–24	Rockford IceHogs	AHL	48	11	16	27	39	4	0	0	0	4
2024–25	Rockford IceHogs	AHL	33	12	14	26	21	—	—	—	—	—
2024–25	Chicago Blackhawks	NHL	25	2	5	7	17	—	—	—	—	—
2025–26	Chicago Blackhawks	NHL	53	3	6	9	47	—	—	—	—	—
2025–26	Edmonton Oilers	NHL	8	2	2	4	5	5	0	1	1	4
NHL totals			86	7	13	20	69	5	0	1	1	4

=== International ===
Year	Team	Event	Result	GP	G	A	Pts	PIM
2019	Alberta	CWG	3rd place, bronze medalist(s)	6	3	3	6	6
2023	Canada	WJC	1st place, gold medalist(s)	4	0	2	2	0
Junior totals				4	0	2	2	0

== Awards and honours ==
Award	Year
WHL
BC First All-Star Team	2022
Ed Chynoweth Cup champion	2023
