= 2019 Canada Winter Games =

Multi-sports competition

- XXVII Canada Games
- Host city: Red Deer, Alberta
- Country: Canada
- Teams: 13
- Athletes: 2383
- Sport: 19
- Events: 164
- Opening: February 15, 2019
- Closing: March 2, 2019
- Torch lighter: Maddison Pearman; Mark Armstrong
- Main venue: Centrium

Winter

The 2019 Canada Winter Games, officially known as the XXVII Canada Games, is a Canadian multi-sport event that was held in Red Deer, Alberta, from February 15, 2019, to March 3, 2019. These were the third Canada Winter Games held in the province of Alberta, after the 1975 Canada Winter Games in Lethbridge and the 1995 Canada Winter Games in Grande Prairie.

== Host selection ==
On September 4, 2014, it was announced that Red Deer had won its bid to host the games by beating Lethbridge.

== Venues ==
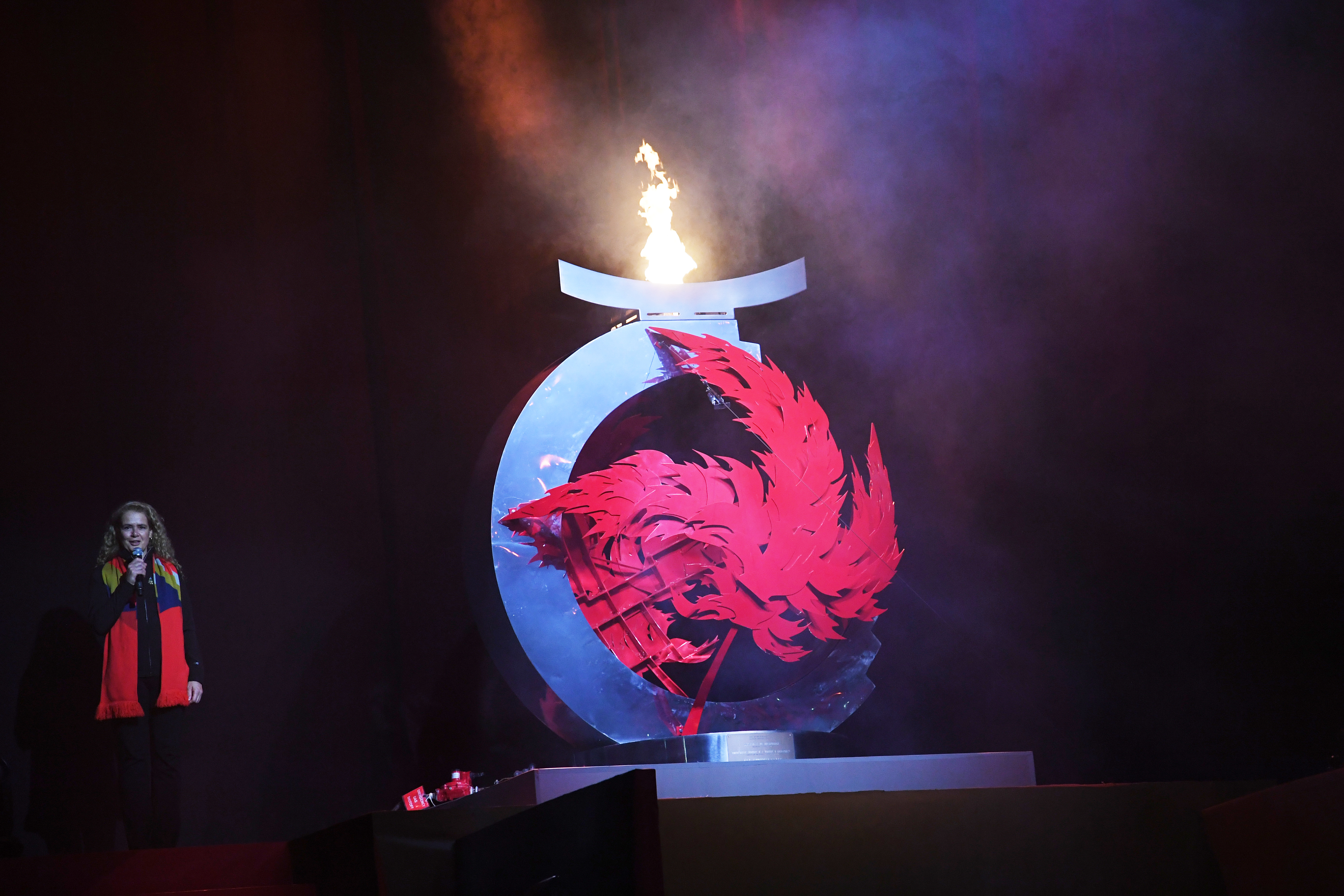
Opening Ceremonies

13 competition venues located in Red Deer, Calgary and Kananaskis were used.

=== Red Deer ===
- Canyon Ski Resort – Alpine skiing, freestyle skiing, snowboarding
- Centrium – hockey
- Collicutt Centre – gymnastics, ringette
- "Downtown Arena" – hockey, ringette
- Gary W. Harris Canada Games Centre – badminton, figure skating, short track speed skating, squash, wheelchair basketball
- Great Chief Park – speed skating
- Kinex Arena – hockey
- Pidherney Centre – curling
- River Ben Golf & Recreation Area – biathlon, cross-country skiing
- Westerner Park – archery, boxing, judo, table tennis

=== Calgary ===
- Repsol Sport Centre – artistic swimming
- WinSport's Canada Olympic Park – freestyle skiing, snowboarding

=== Kananaskis ===
- Nakiska Ski Resort – Alpine skiing

== Sports ==
164 medals events in 19 sports were contested. Note, ski cross is included in the alpine ski program.

- Alpine skiing (12)
- Archery (6)
- Artistic swimming (3)
- Badminton (6)
- Biathlon (8)
- Boxing (6)
- Cross-country skiing (19)
- Curling (2)
- Figure skating (12)
- Freestyle skiing (10)
- Gymnastics
  - Artistic gymnastics (14)
  - Trampoline (5)
- Hockey (2)
- Judo (16)
- Ringette (1)
- Short track speed skating (10)
- Snowboarding (8)
- Speed skating (12)
- Squash (4)
- Table tennis (7)
- Wheelchair basketball (1)

== Participating Provinces/Territories ==
All 13 of Canada's provinces and territories competed. The number of competitors each province or territory entered is in brackets.

- Alberta (247) (hosts)
- British Columbia (251)
- Manitoba (208)
- New Brunswick (201)
- Newfoundland and Labrador (157)
- Northwest Territories (93)
- Nova Scotia (211)
- Nunavut (43)
- Ontario (250)
- Prince Edward Island (155)
- Quebec (243)
- Saskatchewan (215)
- Yukon (109)

== Schedule ==
The competition was held over 16 days, with Saturday the 23rd being the transition day (no events held).

OC	Opening ceremony	●	Event competitions	1	Event finals	CC	Closing ceremony

February/March		15 Fri	16 Sat	17 Sun	18 Mon	19 Tue	20 Wed	21 Thu	22 Fri	24 Sun	25 Mon	26 Tue	27 Wed	28 Thu	1 Fri	2 Sat	3 Sun	Events
Ceremonies (opening / closing)		OC														CC		—N/a
Alpine skiing											2	4	4		2			12
Archery												●	●	4	2			6
Artistic swimming				●	●	●	1	2										3
Badminton											●	●	5	●	●	1		6
Biathlon				2		2	2	2										8
Boxing				●	●	●	6											6
Cross-country skiing											2	6		6		5		19
Curling										●	●	●	●	●	●	2		2
Figure skating											1	1	5	5				12
Freestyle skiing				2	2		2	2	2									10
Gymnastics	Artistic			1	1	1	1	10										14
Gymnastics	Trampoline										2	1		2				5
Hockey			●	●	●	●	●	●	1	●	●	●	●	●	●	1		2
Judo												7	7		2			16
Ringette			●	●	●	●	●	●	1									1
Short track speed skating				●	2		2	2	4									10
Snowboarding											2	2		2	2			8
Speed skating			2	4		2	3	1										12
Squash										●	●	●	●	●	2	2		4
Table tennis			●	●	2	●	●	5										7
Wheelchair basketball				●	●	●	●	1										1
Total events			2	9	7	5	17	25	8	0	9	21	21	19	10	11	0	164
Cumulative total			2	11	18	23	40	65	73	73	82	103	124	143	153	164	164	—N/a
		15 Fri	16 Sat	17 Sun	18 Mon	19 Tue	20 Wed	21 Thu	22 Fri	24 Sun	25 Mon	26 Tue	27 Wed	28 Thu	1 Fri	2 Sat	3 Sun	Events

== Medal table ==
The following is the medal table.

Rank	Team	Gold	Silver	Bronze	Total
1	Quebec	65	41	40	146
2	Alberta	36	33	31	100
3	British Columbia	30	28	29	87
4	Ontario	18	43	44	105
5	Manitoba	9	7	9	25
6	Saskatchewan	3	3	11	17
7	Nova Scotia	1	6	4	11
8	New Brunswick	1	3	5	9
9	Newfoundland and Labrador	1	0	1	2
10	Prince Edward Island	0	1	1	2
11	Northwest Territories	0	0	1	1
11	Yukon	0	0	1	1
13	Nunavut	0	0	0	0
Totals (13 entries)		164	165	177	506

- Two silvers were awarded in the men's individual all-around gymnastics event.
