= Servus Arena =

Indoor arena in Red Deer, Alberta

- Interactive map of Servus Arena
- Location: Red Deer, Alberta, Canada
- Coordinates: 52.26110°N 113.80606°W
- Capacity: Hockey: 1,360

Construction
- Groundbreaking: 2016
- Opened: 2018
- Cost: CA$21.6 million

Tenant
- Red Deer Vipers (HJHL) (2018–present)

Servus Arena is a multi-purpose indoor arena in downtown Red Deer, Alberta. Opened in January 2018, it was constructed on the site of the former Red Deer Arena (which was succeeded as Red Deer's primary events venue by ENMAX Centrium following its opening in 1994).

== History ==
The arena replaced the Red Deer Arena, which first opened in 1952 and was demolished in 2016; equipment from the arena was salvaged and provided to other facilities, while its neon sign was incorporated into the new arena's design. The $21.6 million facility was scheduled to be completed by mid-2018, in anticipation of the 2019 Canada Winter Games. In 2017, Servus Credit Union acquired naming rights to the new facility, naming it Servus Arena.

In November 2017, it was reported that construction was ahead of schedule, and that Servus Arena could open as early as January 2018. Servus Arena officially opened on January 13, 2018, with the Red Deer Vipers playing the Three Hills Thrashers in a Heritage Junior B Hockey League game.

== Events ==
Servus Arena hosted group B preliminaries during the 2018 Hlinka Gretzky Cup U-18 hockey tournament, with Rogers Place in Edmonton hosting Group A and the semi-finals onward.
