= 2022–23 QMJHL season =

- League: Quebec Major Junior Hockey League
- Sport: Hockey
- Duration: Regular season September 22, 2022 – March 25, 2023; Playoffs; March 31, 2023 – May 21, 2023
- Teams: 18
- TV partner(s): Eastlink TV; TVA Sports; MATV

Draft
- Top draft pick: Tomas Lavoie
- Picked by: Cape Breton Eagles

Regular season
- Jean Rougeau Trophy: Quebec Remparts (8)
- Season MVP: Jordan Dumais (Halifax Mooseheads)
- Top scorer: Jordan Dumais (Halifax Mooseheads)

Playoffs
- Playoffs MVP: James Malatesta (Remparts)
- Finals champions: Quebec Remparts
- Runners-up: Halifax Mooseheads

QMJHL seasons
- 2021–22 2023–24

2022–23 CHL season
- League: Canadian Hockey League
- Sport: Hockey
- Duration: OHL; September 2022 – May 2023; QMJHL; September 2022 – May 2023; WHL; September 2022 – May 2023
- Teams: 60
- TV partner(s): RDS; TSN; Rogers TV; Shaw TV
- Season MVP: Connor Bedard (Regina Pats) (WHL)
- Top scorer: Connor Bedard (Regina Pats) (WHL)

Memorial Cup
- Finals champions: Quebec Remparts (QMJHL) (3rd title)
- Runners-up: Seattle Thunderbirds (WHL)

The 2022–23 QMJHL season was the 54th season of the Quebec Major Junior Hockey League (QMJHL). The regular season began on September 22, 2022, and ended on March 25, 2023. The playoffs began in March 2023, concluding in May 2023. QMJHL commissioner Gilles Courteau, who resigned on March 5, 2023, was succeeded by Martin Lavallée as the interim commissioner.

The winning team, the Quebec Remparts were awarded the Gilles-Courteau Trophy and earned a berth in the 2023 Memorial Cup which was hosted by the Kamloops Blazers of the Western Hockey League at the Sandman Centre in Kamloops, British Columbia.

== Regular season standings ==
As of March 22, 2023

Note: GP = Games played; W = Wins; L = Losses; OTL = Overtime losses; SL = Shootout losses; GF = Goals for; GA = Goals against; PTS = Points; x = clinched playoff berth; y = clinched division title; z = clinched Jean Rougeau Trophy

=== Eastern Conference ===
Maritimes Division	GP	W	L	OTL	SL	PTS	GF	GA	Rank
xy-Halifax Mooseheads	68	50	11	4	3	107	335	196	2
x-Moncton Wildcats	68	35	29	2	2	74	255	249	3
x-Cape Breton Eagles	68	30	34	3	1	64	224	275	7
x-Charlottetown Islanders	68	26	33	6	3	61	189	267	8
x-Saint John Sea Dogs	68	24	38	5	1	54	233	318	9
Acadie–Bathurst Titan	68	20	40	5	3	48	203	278	10

East Division	GP	W	L	OTL	SL	PTS	GF	GA	Rank
xyz-Quebec Remparts	68	53	12	1	2	109	286	160	1
x-Chicoutimi Saguenéens	68	33	31	3	1	70	234	281	4
x-Rimouski Océanic	68	32	31	3	2	69	213	216	5
x-Baie-Comeau Drakkar	68	30	32	4	2	66	205	244	6

=== Western Conference ===
West Division	GP	W	L	OTL	SL	PTS	GF	GA	Rank
xy-Gatineau Olympiques	68	49	12	5	2	105	304	197	2
x-Rouyn-Noranda Huskies	68	37	24	4	3	81	240	227	4
x-Blainville-Boisbriand Armada	68	22	37	6	3	53	206	261	7
Val-d'Or Foreurs	68	24	40	2	2	52	223	301	8

Central Division	GP	W	L	OTL	SL	PTS	GF	GA	Rank
xy-Sherbrooke Phoenix	68	50	13	3	2	105	317	172	1
x-Victoriaville Tigres	68	40	20	2	6	88	244	190	3
x-Shawinigan Cataractes	68	29	34	2	3	63	209	236	5
x-Drummondville Voltigeurs	68	29	34	4	1	63	205	251	6

== Scoring leaders ==
Note: GP = Games played; G = Goals; A = Assists; Pts = Points; PIM = Penalty minutes
Source: TheQMJHL.ca

Player	Team	GP	G	A	Pts	PIM
Jordan Dumais	Halifax Mooseheads	64	54	86	140	6
Josh Lawrence	Blainville-Boisbriand/Halifax	69	50	69	119	22
Alexandre Doucet	Val-d'Or/Halifax	70	58	57	115	44
Zachary Bolduc	Quebec Remparts	61	50	60	110	50
Riley Kidney	Acadie–Bathurst/Gatineau	60	28	82	110	48
Théo Rochette	Quebec Remparts	65	42	64	106	28
Jacob Melanson	Acadie–Bathurst/Sherbrooke	59	50	49	99	55
Joshua Roy	Sherbrooke Phoenix	55	46	53	99	14
Justin Gill	Sherbrooke Phoenix	68	44	49	93	41
Ivan Ivan	Cape Breton Eagles	64	33	57	90	52

== Leading goaltenders ==
Note: GP = Games played; Mins = Minutes played; W = Wins; L = Losses: OTL = Overtime losses; SL = Shootout losses; GA = Goals Allowed; SO = Shutouts; GAA = Goals against average
Source: TheQMJHL.ca

Player	Team	GP	Mins	W	L	OTL	SOL	GA	SO	Sv%	GAA
William Rousseau	Quebec Remparts	47	2,730:01	35	8	1	2	101	4	.908	2.22
Nathan Darveau	Victoriaville Tigres	50	2,971:40	27	14	2	6	116	2	.929	2.34
Francesco Lapenna	Charlottetown/Gatineau	49	2,843:45	32	12	3	0	114	3	.922	2.41
Olivier Adam	Baie-Comeau/Sherbrooke	45	2,667:54	29	11	2	1	108	5	.910	2.43
Mathis Rousseau	Halifax Mooseheads	49	2,878:09	36	7	2	3	119	4	.912	2.48

== 2023 Gilles-Courteau Trophy playoffs ==
In the first two rounds seeding is determined by conference standings, and in the two final rounds seeding is determined by overall standings.

Conference quarter-finals
W1	Sherbrooke	4
W7	Blainville-Boisbriand	0
W2	Gatineau	4
E9	Saint John	1
W3	Victoriaville	1
W6	Drummondville	4
W4	Rouyn-Noranda	4
W5	Shawinigan	1
E1	Quebec	4
E8	Charlottetown	0
E2	Halifax	4
E7	Cape Breton	0
E3	Moncton	4
E6	Baie-Comeau	3
E4	Chicoutimi	1
E5	Rimouski	4

Conference semi-finals
W1	Sherbrooke	4
W6	Drummondville	0
W2	Gatineau	4
W4	Rouyn-Noranda	0
E1	Quebec	4
E5	Rimouski	0
E2	Halifax	4
E3	Moncton	1

Semi-finals
1	Quebec	4
4	Gatineau	0
2	Halifax	4
3	Sherbrooke	2

Gilles-Courteau Trophy Championship
1	Quebec	4
2	Halifax	2

== Conference quarter-finals ==
=== Western Conference quarter-finals ===
==== (1) Sherbrooke Phoenix vs. (7) Blainville-Boisbriand Armada ====
March 31	Blainville-Boisbriand Armada	2 – 5	Sherbrooke Phoenix	Palais des Sports Léopold-Drolet	Recap
No scoring		First period	7:55 - pp - Jacob Melanson (1)
Thomas Paquet (1) - 12:58		Second period	No scoring
Jonathan Fauchon (1) - pp - 7:51		Third period	5:47 - Joe Fleming (1); 12:25 - Hugo Primeau (1); 12:35 - Justin Gill (1); 16:52 - en - Joshua Roy (1)
Charles-Édward Gravel (27 saves / 31 shots)		Goalie stats	Olivier Adam (17 saves / 19 shots)

April 1	Blainville-Boisbriand Armada	3 – 6	Sherbrooke Phoenix	Palais des Sports Léopold-Drolet	Recap

April 4	Sherbrooke Phoenix	6 – 2	Blainville-Boisbriand Armada	Centre d'Excellence Sports Rousseau	Recap

April 5	Sherbrooke Phoenix	5 – 0	Blainville-Boisbriand Armada	Centre d'Excellence Sports Rousseau	Recap

Sherbrooke wins series 4 – 0

==== (2) Gatineau Olympiques vs. (E9) Saint John Sea Dogs ====
March 31	Saint John Sea Dogs	1 – 7	Gatineau Olympiques	Centre Slush Puppie	Recap
No scoring		First period	16:16 - Antonin Verreault (1)
No scoring		Second period	13:46 - Olivier Nadeau (1)
Jared Cosman (1) - sh - 6:31		Third period	0:20 - Zach Dean (1); 1:51 - Zach Dean (2); 13:15 - Zach Dean (3); 14:55 - Will Chisholm (1); 19:06 - Alexis Gendron (1)
Ventsislav Shingarov (45 saves / 52 shots)		Goalie stats	Francesco Lapenna (21 saves / 22 shots)

April 1	Saint John Sea Dogs	0 – 9	Gatineau Olympiques	Centre Slush Puppie	Recap

April 4	Gatineau Olympiques	2 – 3	Saint John Sea Dogs	TD Station	Recap

April 5	Gatineau Olympiques	6 – 0	Saint John Sea Dogs	TD Station	Recap

April 7	Gatineau Olympiques	6 – 1	Saint John Sea Dogs	TD Station	Recap

Gatineau wins series 4 – 1

==== (3) Victoriaville Tigres vs. (6) Drummondville Voltigeurs ====
March 31	Drummondville Voltigeurs	4 – 5	2OT	Victoriaville Tigres	Colisée Desjardins	Recap
Drew Elliot (1) - 9:29; Luke Woodworth (1) - 10:12; Maveric Lamoureux (1) - 19:09		First period		1:39 - Justin Larose (1)
No scoring		Second period		14:57 - Maxime Pellerin (1)
Loic Goyette (1) - 6:20		Third period		0:12 - Nikita Prishchepov (1); 17:33 - Nikita Prishchepov (2)
No scoring		Second overtime period		4:26 - Raphaël Blouin (1)
Riley Mercer (30 saves / 35 shots)		Goalie stats		Nathan Darveau (42 saves / 46 shots)

April 1	Drummondville Voltigeurs	3 – 1	Victoriaville Tigres	Colisée Desjardins	Recap

April 4	Victoriaville Tigres	1 – 4	Drummondville Voltigeurs	Centre Marcel-Dionne	Recap

April 5	Victoriaville Tigres	1 – 2	Drummondville Voltigeurs	Centre Marcel-Dionne	Recap

April 7	Drummondville Voltigeurs	4 – 2	Victoriaville Tigres	Colisée Desjardins	Recap

Drummondville wins series 4 – 1

==== (4) Rouyn-Noranda Huskies vs. (5) Shawinigan Cataractes ====
March 31	Shawinigan Cataractes	6 – 7	2OT	Rouyn-Noranda Huskies	Aréna Glencore	Recap
Stéphane Huard (1) - 12:56; Alexis Bonefon (1) - pp - 14:04		First period		3:17 - Thomas Verdon (1)
Félix Lacerte (1) - 5:31; Alexis Bonefon (2) - 9:53		Second period		11:29 - pp - Tristan Allard (1)
Lorenzo Canonica (1) - 13:15; Lou-Félix Denis (1) - 19:26		Third period		1:11 - Benjamin Brunelle (1); 5:19 - pp - Mathis Perron (1); 18:33 - pp - Bill Zonnon (1); 18:56 - Daniil Bourash (1)
No scoring		Second overtime period		11:08 - Émeric Gaudet (1)
Rémi Delafontaine (42 saves / 49 shots)		Goalie stats		Thomas Couture (25 saves / 31 shots)

April 1	Shawinigan Cataractes	3 – 2	Rouyn-Noranda Huskies	Aréna Glencore	Recap

April 4	Rouyn-Noranda Huskies	4 – 0	Shawinigan Cataractes	Centre Gervais Auto	Recap

April 5	Rouyn-Noranda Huskies	6 – 3	Shawinigan Cataractes	Centre Gervais Auto	Recap

April 7	Rouyn-Noranda Huskies	5 – 3	Shawinigan Cataractes	Centre Gervais Auto	Recap

Rouyn-Noranda wins series 4 – 1

=== Eastern Conference quarter-finals ===
==== (1) Quebec Remparts vs. (8) Charlottetown Islanders ====
March 31	Charlottetown Islanders	0 – 4	Quebec Remparts	Centre Vidéotron	Recap
No scoring		First period	12:17 - pp - James Malatesta (1)
No scoring		Second period	4:12 - pp - Zachary Bolduc (1); 17:40 - Charles Savoie (1)
No scoring		Third period	2:34 - Justin Robidas (1)
Jakob Robillard (44 saves / 48 shots)		Goalie stats	William Rousseau (13 saves / 13 shots)

April 1	Charlottetown Islanders	1 – 3	Quebec Remparts	Centre Vidéotron	Recap
No scoring		First period	No scoring
No scoring		Second period	No scoring
Michael Horth (1) - 17:03		Third period	9:02 - James Malatesta (2); 11:14 - Zachary Bolduc (2); 12:27 - Daniel Agostino (1)
Jakob Robillard (40 saves / 43 shots)		Goalie stats	William Rousseau (21 saves / 22 shots)

April 4	Quebec Remparts	8 – 2	Charlottetown Islanders	Eastlink Centre	Recap
Evan Nause (1) - pp - 13:08; Charle Truchon (1) - 13:39		First period	No scoring
Kassim Gaudet (1) - 5:27; Pier-Olivier Roy (1) - 19:57		Second period	19:48 - Alexis Michaud (1)
Justin Robidas (2) - 2:30; Mikael Huchette (1) - pp - 3:53; Charles Savoie (2) - pp - 12:14; Evan Nause (2) - 18:45		Third period	9:58 - sh - Keiran Gallant (1)
William Rousseau (25 saves / 27 shots)		Goalie stats	Jakob Robillard (35 saves / 43 shots)

April 5	Quebec Remparts	5 – 1	Charlottetown Islanders	Eastlink Centre	Recap
No scoring		First period	No scoring
Zachary Bolduc (3) - 8:32; Pier-Olivier Roy (2) - sh - 13:20; Nathan Gaucher (1) - 18:07		Second period	13:49 - Kiefer Lyons (1)
Justin Robidas (3) - 5:43; Kassim Gaudet (2) - en - 17:31		Third period	No scoring
William Rousseau (25 saves / 26 shots)		Goalie stats	Jakob Robillard (44 saves / 48 shots)

Quebec wins series 4 – 0

==== (2) Halifax Mooseheads vs. (7) Cape Breton Eagles ====
March 31	Cape Breton Eagles	1 – 4	Halifax Mooseheads	Scotiabank Centre	Recap
No scoring		First period	10:21 - Markus Vidicek (1); 16:02 - Josh Lawrence (1)
No scoring		Second period	19:07 - pp - Brady Schultz (1)
Angelo Fullerton (1) - 11:42		Third period	0:31 - Braeden MacPhee (1)
Oliver Šatný (26 saves / 30 shots)		Goalie stats	Mathis Rousseau (37 saves / 38 shots)

April 1	Cape Breton Eagles	3 – 4	OT	Halifax Mooseheads	Scotiabank Centre	Recap
Ivan Ivan (1) - 1:13; Ivan Ivan (2) - 2:49		First period		No scoring
Ivan Ivan (3) - 1:8		Second period		9:50 - Brody Fournier (1)
No scoring		Third period		13:20 - Josh Lawrence (2); 18:50 - Alexandre Doucet (1)
No scoring		First overtime period		9:19 - Evan Boucher (1)
Nicolas Ruccia (43 saves / 47 shots)		Goalie stats		Mathis Rousseau (23 saves / 26 shots)

April 4	Halifax Mooseheads	8 – 2	Cape Breton Eagles	Centre 200	Recap
No scoring		First period	18:31 - pp - Jacob Newcombe (2)
Alexandre Doucet (2) - pp - 2:28; Alexandre Doucet (3) - 5:20; Alexandre Doucet (4) - pp 10:55; Jordan Dumais (1) - pp - 18:54; Attilio Biasca (1) - 19:37		Second period	No scoring
Markus Vidicek (2) - 2:38; Markus Vidicek (3) - 12:27; Josh Lawrence (3) - 15:13		Third period	5:59 - Jacob Newcombe (2)
Mathis Rousseau (26 saves / 28 shots)		Goalie stats	Nicolas Ruccia (24 saves / 32 shots)

April 5	Halifax Mooseheads	3 – 2	Cape Breton Eagles	Centre 200	Recap
Jordan Dumais (2) - 9:02		First period	17:34 - Charles Boutin (1)
Markus Vidicek (4) - 4:14; Alexandre Doucet (5) - sh - 14:48		Second period	11:00 - Olivier Houde (1)
No scoring		Third period	No scoring
Mathis Rousseau (29 saves / 31 shots)		Goalie stats	Oliver Šatný (30 saves / 33 shots)

Halifax wins series 4 – 0

==== (3) Moncton Wildcats vs. (6) Baie-Comeau Drakkar ====
March 31	Baie-Comeau Drakkar	3 – 4	OT	Moncton Wildcats	Avenir Centre	Recap
Marc-Antoine Séguin (1) - 7:40; Louis-Charles Plourde (1) - 17:55		First period		11:38 - Alex Mercier (1)
Marshall Lessard (1) - 3:14		Second period		6:02 - Alex Mercier (2); 9:40 - pp - Yoan Loshing (1)
No scoring		Third period		No scoring
No scoring		First overtime period		4:35 - Jonas Taibel (1)
Olivier Ciarlo (29 saves / 33 shots)		Goalie stats		Jacob Steinman (35 saves / 38 shots)

April 1	Baie-Comeau Drakkar	4 – 3	OT	Moncton Wildcats	Avenir Centre	Recap
No scoring		First period		7:24 - pp - Étienne Morin (1)
Félix Gagnon (1) - 11:14		Second period		2:02 - pp - Yoan Loshing (2); 4:34 - Yoan Loshing (3)
Justin Poirier (1) - 4:20; Anthony Lavoie (1) - 13:25		Third period		No scoring
Charles-Antoine Lavallée (1) - 1:57		First overtime period		No scoring
Olivier Ciarlo (46 saves / 49 shots)		Goalie stats		Jacob Steinman (38 saves / 42 shots)

April 4	Moncton Wildcats	5 – 2	Baie-Comeau Drakkar	Centre Henry-Leonard	Recap

April 5	Moncton Wildcats	2 – 5	Baie-Comeau Drakkar	Centre Henry-Leonard	Recap

April 7	Moncton Wildcats	3 – 2	OT	Baie-Comeau Drakkar	Centre Henry-Leonard	Recap

April 10	Baie-Comeau Drakkar	4 – 3	OT	Moncton Wildcats	Avenir Centre	Recap

April 11	Baie-Comeau Drakkar	4 – 5	OT	Moncton Wildcats	Avenir Centre	Recap

Moncton wins series 4 – 3

==== (4) Chicoutimi Saguenéens vs. (5) Rimouski Océanic ====
March 31	Rimouski Océanic	4 – 3	OT	Chicoutimi Saguenéens	Centre Georges-Vézina	Recap
Xavier Filion (1) - 7:05; Spencer Gill (1) - pp - 19:44		First period		14:13 - pp - Emmanuel Vermette (1); 16:47 - pp - Pēteris Bulāns (1)
No scoring		Second period		No scoring
Alexandre Blais (1) - 8:35		Third period		4:21 - pp - Zachary Gravel (1)
Luke Coughlin (1) - pp - 2:13		First overtime period		No scoring
Patrik Hamrla (14 saves / 17 shots)		Goalie stats		Charles-Antoine Lavallée (26 saves / 30 shots)

April 1	Rimouski Océanic	5 – 2	Chicoutimi Saguenéens	Centre Georges-Vézina	Recap
Luka Verreault (1) - pp - 15:47; Maxime Coursol (1) - pp - 19:48		First period	No scoring
No scoring		Second period	6:01 - Thomas Bégin (1)
Nathan Lévesque (1) - 1:24; Alexandre Blais (2) - pp - 4:43; Simon Maltais (1) - en - 19:39		Third period	12:24 - sh - Samuel Vachon (1)
Patrik Hamrla (17 saves / 19 shots)		Goalie stats	Charles-Antoine Lavallée (25 saves / 29 shots)

April 4	Chicoutimi Saguenéens	1 – 5	Rimouski Océanic	Colisée Financière Sun Life	Recap
No scoring		First period	1:28 - Luka Verreault (2)
Romain Rodzinski (1) - 2:18		Second period	14:00 - Simon Maltais (2)
No scoring		Third period	10:42 - Alexandre Lefebvre (1); 17:55 - sh - en - Alexander Gaudio (1); 18:50 - Alexandre Lefebvre (2)
Charles-Antoine Lavallée (27 saves / 31 shots)		Goalie stats	Patrik Hamrla (18 saves / 19 shots)

April 5	Chicoutimi Saguenéens	5 – 1	Rimouski Océanic	Colisée Financière Sun Life	Recap
No scoring		First period	No scoring
Jeremy Leroux (1) - 2:28; Alexis Morin (1) - pp - 14:04		Second period	No scoring
Jeremy Leroux (2) - 4:14; Émile Duquet (1) - 5:04; Samuel Vachon (2) - 16:31		Third period	William Dumoulin (1) - 2:39
Charles-Antoine Lavallée (37 saves / 38 shots)		Goalie stats	Patrik Hamrla (22 saves / 26 shots); Gabriel Robert (5 saves / 6 shots)

April 7	Rimouski Océanic	4 – 2	Chicoutimi Saguenéens	Centre Georges-Vézina	Recap
Jacob Mathieu (1) - 4:03; Alexander Gaudio (2) - 13:02		First period	No scoring
Luka Verreault (3) - 13:28		Second period	6:26 - pp - Emmanuel Vermette (2); 18:31 - Pēteris Bulāns (2)
Mathis Gauthier (1) - 9:17		Third period	No scoring
Patrik Hamrla (23 saves / 25 shots)		Goalie stats	Charles-Antoine Lavallée (22 saves / 26 shots)

Rimouski wins series 4 – 1

== Conference semi-finals ==
=== Western Conference semi-finals ===
==== (1) Sherbrooke Phoenix vs. (6) Drummondville Voltigeurs ====
April 14	Drummondville Voltigeurs	3 – 7	Sherbrooke Phoenix	Palais des Sports Léopold-Drolet	Recap

April 15	Drummondville Voltigeurs	1 – 8	Sherbrooke Phoenix	Palais des Sports Léopold-Drolet	Recap

April 18	Sherbrooke Phoenix	4 – 1	Drummondville Voltigeurs	Centre Marcel-Dionne	Recap

April 19	Sherbrooke Phoenix	5 – 2	Drummondville Voltigeurs	Centre Marcel-Dionne	Recap

Sherbrooke wins series 4 – 0

==== (2) Gatineau Olympiques vs. (4) Rouyn-Noranda Huskies ====
April 14	Rouyn-Noranda Huskies	0 – 5	Gatineau Olympiques	Centre Slush Puppie	Recap

April 15	Rouyn-Noranda Huskies	0 – 5	Gatineau Olympiques	Centre Slush Puppie	Recap

April 18	Gatineau Olympiques	7 – 3	Rouyn-Noranda Huskies	Aréna Glencore	Recap

April 19	Gatineau Olympiques	6 – 1	Rouyn-Noranda Huskies	Aréna Glencore	Recap

Gatineau wins series 4 – 0

=== Eastern Conference semi-finals ===
==== (1) Quebec Remparts vs. (5) Rimouski Océanic ====
April 14	Rimouski Océanic	3 – 6	Quebec Remparts	Videotron Centre	Recap

April 15	Rimouski Océanic	1 – 5	Quebec Remparts	Videotron Centre	Recap

April 18	Quebec Remparts	4 – 3	OT	Rimouski Océanic	Colisée Financière Sun Life	Recap

April 19	Quebec Remparts	4 – 2	Rimouski Océanic	Colisée Financière Sun Life	Recap

Quebec wins series 4 – 0

==== (2) Halifax Mooseheads vs. (3) Moncton Wildcats ====
April 14	Moncton Wildcats	4 – 1	Halifax Mooseheads	Scotiabank Centre	Recap

April 15	Moncton Wildcats	1 – 7	Halifax Mooseheads	Scotiabank Centre	Recap

April 19	Halifax Mooseheads	4 – 2	Moncton Wildcats	Avenir Centre	Recap

April 20	Halifax Mooseheads	3 – 0	Moncton Wildcats	Avenir Centre	Recap

April 23	Moncton Wildcats	3 – 7	Halifax Mooseheads	Scotiabank Centre	Recap

Halifax wins series 4 – 1

== Semi-finals ==
=== (1) Quebec Remparts vs. (4) Gatineau Olympiques ===
April 28	Gatineau Olympiques	2 – 5	Quebec Remparts	Videotron Centre	Recap

April 30	Gatineau Olympiques	3 – 4	OT	Quebec Remparts	Videotron Centre	Recap

May 2	Quebec Remparts	5 – 4	OT	Gatineau Olympiques	Centre Slush Puppie	Recap

May 3	Quebec Remparts	3 – 1	Gatineau Olympiques	Centre Slush Puppie	Recap

Quebec wins series 4 – 0

=== (2) Halifax Mooseheads vs. (3) Sherbrooke Phoenix ===
April 29	Sherbrooke Phoenix	5 – 2	Halifax Mooseheads	Scotiabank Centre	Recap

April 30	Sherbrooke Phoenix	3 – 2	OT	Halifax Mooseheads	Scotiabank Centre	Recap

May 2	Halifax Mooseheads	5 – 2	Sherbrooke Phoenix	Palais des Sports Léopold-Drolet	Recap

May 4	Halifax Mooseheads	5 – 2	Sherbrooke Phoenix	Palais des Sports Léopold-Drolet	Recap

May 6	Sherbrooke Phoenix	0 – 5	Halifax Mooseheads	Scotiabank Centre	Recap

May 7	Halifax Mooseheads	1 – 0	Sherbrooke Phoenix	Palais des Sports Léopold-Drolet	Recap

Halifax wins series 4 – 2

== Gilles-Courteau Trophy Championship ==
=== (1) Quebec Remparts vs. (2) Halifax Mooseheads ===
May 12	Halifax Mooseheads	1 – 5	Quebec Remparts	Videotron Centre	Recap

May 13	Halifax Mooseheads	6 – 3	Quebec Remparts	Videotron Centre	Recap

May 16	Quebec Remparts	5 – 4	OT	Halifax Mooseheads	Scotiabank Centre	Recap

May 17	Quebec Remparts	2 – 1	Halifax Mooseheads	Scotiabank Centre	Recap

May 19	Halifax Mooseheads	3 – 2	Quebec Remparts	Videotron Centre	Recap

May 21	Quebec Remparts	5 – 4	Halifax Mooseheads	Scotiabank Centre	Recap

Quebec wins series 4 – 2

== Playoff leading scorers ==
Note: GP = Games played; G = Goals; A = Assists; Pts = Points; PIM = Penalties minutes

Player	Team	GP	G	A	Pts	PIM
Alexandre Doucet	Halifax Mooseheads	21	14	17	31	10
Josh Lawrence	Halifax Mooseheads	21	12	19	31	12
Justin Robidas	Quebec Remparts	18	11	16	27	2
Zachary L'Heureux	Halifax Mooseheads	20	11	15	26	43
Zach Dean	Gatineau Olympiques	13	10	16	26	10
Joshua Roy	Sherbrooke Phoenix	14	12	12	24	2
Riley Kidney	Gatineau Olympiques	13	6	16	22	4
Jordan Dumais	Halifax Mooseheads	15	5	16	21	2
Théo Rochette	Quebec Remparts	18	4	17	21	8
James Malatesta	Quebec Remparts	18	14	6	20	16

== Playoff leading goaltenders ==
Note: GP = Games played; Mins = Minutes played; W = Wins; L = Losses: OTL = Overtime losses; SL = Shootout losses; GA = Goals Allowed; SO = Shutouts; GAA = Goals against average

Player	Team	GP	Mins	W	L	GA	SO	Sv%	GAA
Francesco Lapenna	Gatineau Olympiques	13	797:35	8	5	24	4	.940	1.81
William Rousseau	Quebec Remparts	18	1,109:57	16	2	41	1	.915	2.22
Mathis Rousseau	Halifax Mooseheads	21	1,279:44	14	7	52	3	.921	2.44
Olivier Adam	Sherbrooke Phoenix	13	709:57	10	3	29	1	.884	2.45
Nathan Darveau	Victoriaville Tigres	5	320:15	1	4	15	0	.910	2.81

== Trophies and awards ==
2022–23 QMJHL Awards
Award	Recipient(s)	Runner(s)-up/Finalists	Source
Gilles-Courteau Trophy; Playoff champions	Quebec Remparts	Halifax Mooseheads	
Jean Rougeau Trophy; Regular season champions	Quebec Remparts	Halifax Mooseheads	
Luc Robitaille Trophy; Team with the best goals for average	Halifax Mooseheads	Sherbrooke Phoenix	
Robert Lebel Trophy; Team with the best goals against average	Quebec Remparts	Sherbrooke Phoenix	
Michel Brière Memorial Trophy; Regular season MVP	Jordan Dumais, Halifax Mooseheads	Nathan Darveau, Victoriaville Tigres; Joshua Roy, Sherbrooke Phoenix	
Jean Béliveau Trophy; Top Scorer	Jordan Dumais, Halifax Mooseheads	Josh Lawrence, Blainville-Boisbriand Armada/ Halifax Mooseheads	
Guy Lafleur Trophy; Playoff MVP	James Malatesta, Quebec Remparts		
Jacques Plante Memorial Trophy; Goaltender of the Year	William Rousseau, Quebec Remparts	Nathan Darveau, Victoriaville Tigres	
Guy Carbonneau Trophy; Best Defensive Forward	Nathan Gaucher, Quebec Remparts	Zach Dean, Gatineau Olympiques; Milo Roelens, Sherbrooke Phoenix	
Emile Bouchard Trophy; Defenceman of the Year	Tristan Luneau, Gatineau Olympiques	Tyson Hinds, Sherbrooke Phoenix; Frédéric Brunet, Victoriaville Tigres	
Kevin Lowe Trophy; Best Defensive Defenceman	Tyson Hinds, Sherbrooke Phoenix	Pier-Olivier Roy, Victoriaville Tigres; Nicolas Savoie, Quebec Remparts	
Michael Bossy Trophy; Top Prospect	Ethan Gauthier, Sherbrooke Phoenix	Mathieu Cataford, Halifax Mooseheads; Etienne Morin, Moncton Wildcats	
RDS Cup; Rookie of the Year	Maxim Massé, Chicoutimi Saguenéens	Marcus Kearsey, Charlottetown Islanders	
Michel Bergeron Trophy; Offensive Rookie of the Year	Maxim Massé, Chicoutimi Saguenéens	Félix Lacerte, Shawinigan Cataractes; Thomas Verdon, Rouyn-Noranda Huskies	
Raymond Lagacé Trophy; Defensive Rookie of the Year	Marcus Kearsey, Charlottetown Islanders	Gabriel D’Aigle, Victoriaville Tigres; Jacob Steinman, Moncton Wildcats	
Frank J. Selke Memorial Trophy; Most Sportsmanlike Player	Attilio Biasca, Halifax Mooseheads	Thomas Belgarde, Victoriaville Tigres; Justin Robidas, Quebec Remparts	
QMJHL Humanitarian of the Year; Humanitarian of the Year	Cam Squires, Cape Breton Eagles	Kaylen Gauthier, Sherbrooke Phoenix; Frédéric Potvin, Val-d'Or Foreurs	
Marcel Robert Trophy; Best Scholastic Player	Julien Béland, Rimouski Océanic	Mathieu Cataford, Halifax Mooseheads; Maxime Pellerin, Victoriaville Tigres	
Paul Dumont Trophy; Personality of the Year	Joshua Roy, Sherbrooke Phoenix	Stéphane Julien, Sherbrooke Phoenix; Louis Robitaille, Gatineau Olympiques	
Ron Lapointe Trophy; Coach of the Year	Stéphane Julien, Sherbrooke Phoenix	Sylvain Favreau, Halifax Mooseheads; Carl Mallette, Victoriaville Tigres	
Maurice Filion Trophy; General Manager of the Year	Stéphane Julien, Sherbrooke Phoenix	Louis Robitaille, Gatineau Olympiques; Patrick Roy, Quebec Remparts	

=== All-Star teams ===
First All-Star Team:

- Nathan Darveau, Goaltender, Victoriaville Tigres
- Tristan Luneau, Defenceman, Gatineau Olympiques
- Tyson Hinds, Defenceman, Sherbrooke Phoenix
- Jordan Dumais, Forward, Halifax Mooseheads
- Riley Kidney, Forward, Acadie–Bathurst Titan/Gatineau Olympiques
- Joshua Roy, Forward, Sherbrooke Phoenix

Second All-Star Team

- Francesco Lapenna, Goaltender, Charlottetown Islanders/Gatineau Olympiques
- Frédéric Brunet, Defenceman, Victoriaville Tigres/Rimouski Océanic
- Pier-Olivier Roy, Defenceman, Victoriaville Tigres
- Zachary Bolduc, Forward, Quebec Remparts
- Alexandre Doucette, Forward, Val-d'Or Foreurs/Halifax Mooseheads
- Josh Lawrence, Forward, Blainville-Boisbriand Armada/Halifax Mooseheads

All-Rookie Team:

- Jacob Steinman, Goaltender, Moncton Wildcats
- Marcus Kearsey, Defenceman, Charlottetown Islanders
- Xavier Daigle, Defenceman, Cape Breton Eagles
- Maxim Massé, Forward, Chicoutimi Saguenéens
- Félix Lacerte, Forward, Shawinigan Cataractes
- Thomas Verdon, Forward, Rouyn-Noranda Huskies

== See also ==
- List of QMJHL seasons
- 2022–23 OHL season
- 2022–23 WHL season

Preceded by 2021–22 QMJHL season	QMJHL seasons	Succeeded by 2023–24 QMJHL season
