= 2023 Memorial Cup =

Canadian junior men's ice hockey championship

Tournament details
- Venue(s): Sandman Centre, Kamloops, British Columbia
- Dates: May 26 – June 4, 2023
- Teams: 4
- Host team: Kamloops Blazers (WHL)
- TV partner(s): TSN, RDS

Final positions
- Champions: Quebec Remparts (QMJHL) (3rd title)
- Runners-up: Seattle Thunderbirds (WHL)

Tournament statistics
- Games played: 9
- Attendance: 48,405 (5,378 per game)
- Scoring leader: Logan Stankoven (Blazers) (9)

Awards
- MVP: James Malatesta (Remparts)

The Memorial Cup trophy

The 2023 Memorial Cup (branded as the 2023 Memorial Cup presented by Kia for sponsorship reasons) was a four-team round-robin format ice hockey tournament held at the Sandman Centre in Kamloops, British Columbia, from May 26 to June 4, 2023. It was the 103rd Memorial Cup championship, which determines the champion of the Canadian Hockey League (CHL). The tournament was hosted by the Kamloops Blazers, who won the right to host the tournament over the Kelowna Rockets. The Quebec Remparts defeated the Seattle Thunderbirds, for their third Memorial Cup title. Remparts forward James Malatesta was named the tournament's most valuable player, with five goals in four games.

== Road to the Cup ==
=== OHL playoffs ===
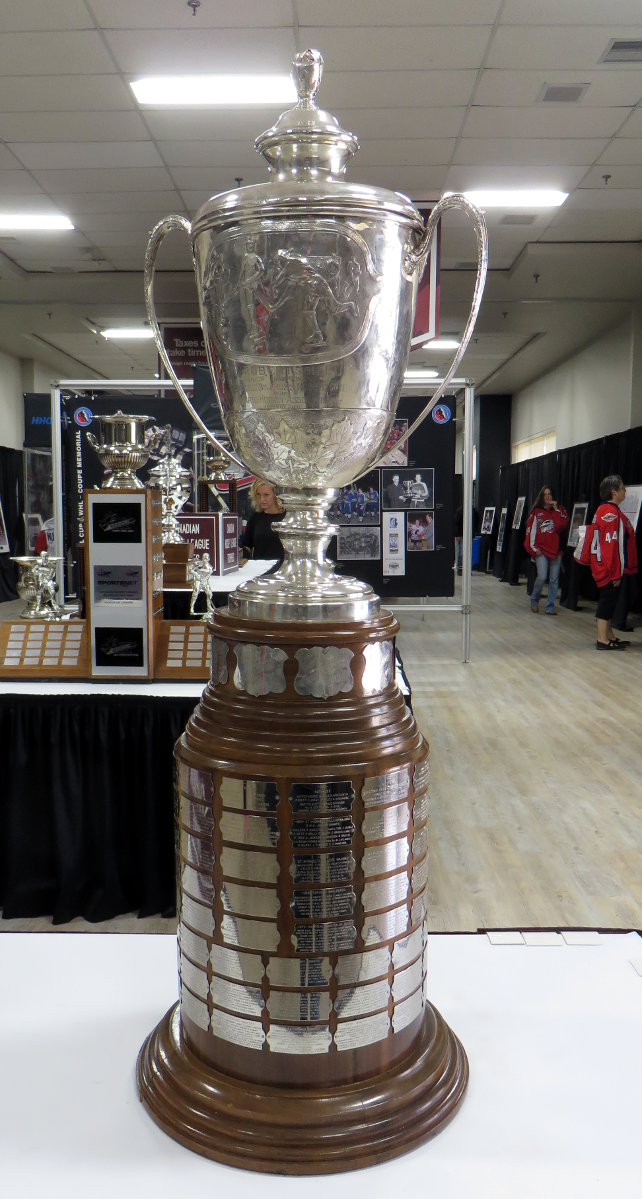
The J. Ross Robertson Cup, championship trophy of the OHL

Conference quarterfinals	Conference semifinals
1	Ottawa	4
8	Oshawa	1
1	Ottawa	2
4	Peterborough	4
4	Peterborough	4
5	Sudbury	0
Eastern Conference
2	North Bay	4
7	Mississauga	2
2	North Bay	4
3	Barrie	3
3	Barrie	4
6	Hamilton	2
1	Windsor	0
8	Kitchener	4
2	London	4
8	Kitchener	1
2	London	4
7	Owen Sound	0
Western Conference
3	Sarnia	4
6	Guelph	2
3	Sarnia	4
4	Saginaw	0
4	Saginaw	4
5	Flint	3

Conference finals
2	North Bay	3
4	Peterborough	4
2	London	4
3	Sarnia	2

OHL Championship
E4	Peterborough	4
W2	London	2

=== QMJHL playoffs ===
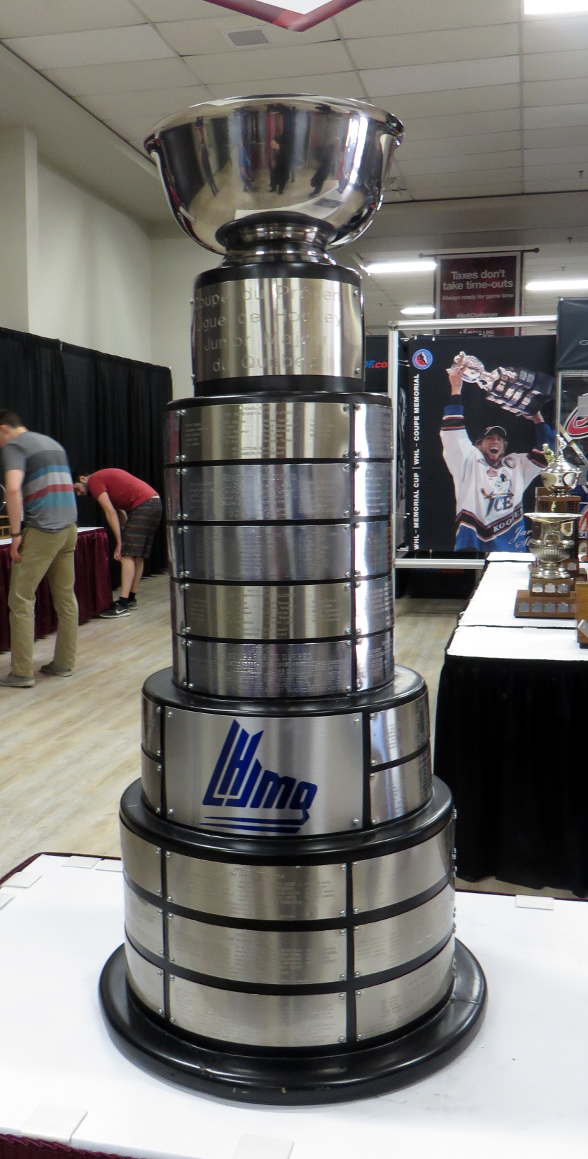
The Gilles-Courteau Trophy, championship trophy of the QMJHL

In the first two rounds seeding is determined by conference standings, and in the two final rounds seeding is determined by overall standings.

Conference quarterfinals
W1	Sherbrooke	4
W7	Blainville-Boisbriand	0
W2	Gatineau	4
E9	Saint John	1
W3	Victoriaville	1
W6	Drummondville	4
W4	Rouyn-Noranda	4
W5	Shawinigan	1
E1	Quebec	4
E8	Charlottetown	0
E2	Halifax	4
E7	Cape Breton	0
E3	Moncton	4
E6	Baie-Comeau	3
E4	Chicoutimi	1
E5	Rimouski	4

Conference semifinals
W1	Sherbrooke	4
W6	Drummondville	0
W2	Gatineau	4
W4	Rouyn-Noranda	0
E1	Quebec	4
E5	Rimouski	0
E2	Halifax	4
E3	Moncton	1

Semifinals
1	Quebec	4
4	Gatineau	0
2	Halifax	4
3	Sherbrooke	2

QMJHL Championship
1	Quebec	4
2	Halifax	2

=== WHL playoffs ===
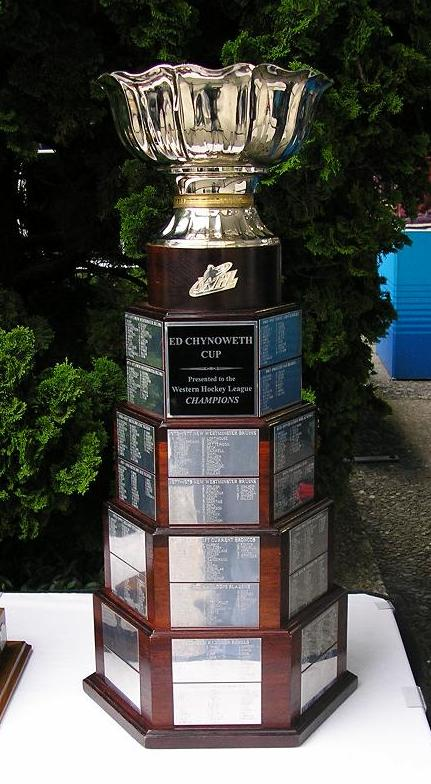
The Ed Chynoweth Cup, championship trophy of the WHL

Conference quarterfinals	Conference semifinals
E1	Winnipeg	4
E8	Medicine Hat	0
E1	Winnipeg	4
E4	Moose Jaw	2
E2	Red Deer	4
E7	Calgary	1
Eastern
E3	Saskatoon	4
E6	Regina	3
E2	Red Deer	3
E3	Saskatoon	4
E4	Moose Jaw	4
E5	Lethbridge	0
Note: Pairings are re-seeded after the first round.
W1	Seattle	4
W8	Kelowna	0
W1	Seattle	4
W4	Prince George	0
W2	Kamloops	4
W7	Vancouver	0
Western
W3	Portland	4
W6	Everett	1
W2	Kamloops	4
W3	Portland	0
W4	Prince George	4
W5	Tri-City	2

Conference finals
E1	Winnipeg	4
E3	Saskatoon	0
W1	Seattle	4
W2	Kamloops	2

WHL Championship
E1	Winnipeg	1
W1	Seattle	4

== Team rosters ==
=== Kamloops Blazers ===
- Head coach: Shaun Clouston

Pos.	No.	Player
G	30	Matthew Kieper
G	35	Dylan Ernst
D	2	Logan Bairos
D	3	Olen Zellweger
D	6	Aapo Sarell
D	12	Ryan Michael
D	21	Kyle Masters
F	9	Emmitt Finnie
F	10	Ryan Hofer
F	11	Logan Stankoven
F	13	Matthew Seminoff
F	15	Connor Levis
F	16	Fraser Minten
F	19	Caedan Bankier
F	22	Daylan Kuefler
F	23	Dylan Sydor
F	27	Jakub Demek
F	33	Shea Van Olm
F	34	Ashton Ferster

=== Seattle Thunderbirds ===
- Head coach: Matt O'Dette

Pos.	No.	Player
G	33	Scott Ratzlaff
G	35	Thomas Milic
D	2	Nolan Allan
D	4	Jeremy Hanzel
D	6	Luke Prokop
D	8	Bryce Pickford
D	14	Kevin Korchinski
D	43	Sawyer Mynio
F	7	Jordan Gustafson
F	11	Brad Lambert
F	15	Mekai Sanders
F	17	Tij Iginla
F	18	Sam Popowich
F	24	Reid Schaefer
F	26	Nico Myatovic
F	28	Ashton McNally
F	29	Jared Davidson
F	34	Colton Dach
F	47	Lucas Ciona
F	59	Gracyn Sawchyn
F	61	Kyle Crnkovic
F	71	Dylan Guenther

=== Peterborough Petes ===
- Head coach: Rob Wilson

Pos.	No.	Player
G	1	Liam Sztuska
G	31	Michael Simpson
D	2	Samuel Mayer
D	3	Cam Gauvreau
D	6	Konnor Smith
D	7	Shawn Spearing
D	8	Gavin White
D	9	Brian Zanetti
D	19	Donovan McCoy
F	10	J. R. Avon
F	12	Sam McCue
F	14	Quinton Pagé
F	15	Braydon McCallum
F	16	Owen Beck
F	18	Connor Lockhart
F	20	Tommy Purdeller
F	22	Tucker Robertson
F	23	Jonathan Melee
F	25	Chase Lefebvre
F	26	Jax Dubois
F	29	Avery Hayes
F	61	Chase Stillman
F	78	Brennan Othmann

=== Quebec Remparts ===
- Head coach: Patrick Roy

Pos.	No.	Player
G	29	Quentin Miller
G	35	William Rousseau
D	5	Vincent Murray
D	13	Mathieu Wener
D	14	Nicolas Savoie
D	20	Evan Nause
D	26	Samuel Lachance
D	47	Charle Truchon
D	64	Thomas Darcy
D	78	Jérémy Langlois
D	83	Vsevolod Komarov
F	6	Andrew Gweon
F	8	Pier-Olivier Roy
F	9	Théo Rochette
F	11	James Malatesta
F	15	Zachary Bolduc
F	18	Charles Savoie
F	19	Mikael Huchette
F	23	Davis Cooper
F	28	Kassim Gaudet
F	67	Daniel Agostino
F	91	Nathan Gaucher
F	92	Elliot Lavoie
F	93	Justin Robidas
F	94	Zachary Marquis-Laflamme

== Tournament games ==
All times local (UTC − 7)

=== Round-robin ===
May 26	Quebec Remparts	8–3	Kamloops Blazers	Sandman Centre	Recap
James Malatesta (1) – 7:36		First period	16:40 – pp – Caedan Bankier (1)
James Malatesta (2) – 1:05; Nathan Gaucher (1) – 3:07; Théo Rochette (1) – pp – 5:42; Kassim Gaudet (1) – 15:20		Second period	16:11 – Daylan Kuefler (1)
Kassim Gaudet (2) – sh – 9:19; Zachary Bolduc (1) – 11:33; James Malatesta (3) – 15:32		Third period	4:30 – Matthew Seminoff (1)
William Rousseau (27 saves / 30 shots)		Goalie stats	Dylan Ernst (25 saves / 33 shots)

May 27	Peterborough Petes	3–6	Seattle Thunderbirds	Sandman Centre	Recap
J. R. Avon (1) – 1:24		First period	No scoring
Owen Beck (1) – 15:53		Second period	0:39 – Lucas Ciona (1); 16:45 – Kyle Crnkovic (1)
Avery Hayes (1) – pp – 13:56		Third period	10:00 – Kyle Crnkovic (2); 11:22 – Nolan Allan (1); 16:45 – Jordan Gustafson (1); 18:26 – en, sh – Kyle Crnkovic (3)
Michael Simpson (34 saves / 39 shots)		Goalie stats	Thomas Milic (23 saves / 26 shots)

May 28	Kamloops Blazers	10–2	Peterborough Petes	Sandman Centre	Recap
Ryan Michael (1) – 5:14; Fraser Minten (1) – pp – 9:08; Ashton Ferster (1) – 13:18		First period	No scoring
Matthew Seminoff (2) – pp – 0:35; Dylan Sydor (1) – 3:01; Logan Stankoven (1) – 4:17; Jakub Demek (1) – pp – 8:17		Second period	15:34 – pp – Avery Hayes (2)
Connor Levis (1) – 1:55; Matthew Seminoff (3) – pp – 8:10; Ryan Hofer (1) – 12:49		Third period	19:37 – Quinton Pagé (1)
Dylan Ernst (28 saves / 30 shots)		Goalie stats	Michael Simpson (15 saves / 20 shots); Liam Sztuska (24 saves / 29 shots)

May 29	Quebec Remparts	3–1	Seattle Thunderbirds	Sandman Centre	Recap
Théo Rochette (2) – 0:54		First period	No scoring
No scoring		Second period	No scoring
Théo Rochette (3) – 16:55; Charle Truchon (1) – en – 19:42		Third period	17:38 – Nolan Allan (2)
William Rousseau (35 saves / 36 shots)		Goalie stats	Thomas Milic (19 saves / 21 shots)

May 30	Quebec Remparts	2–4	Peterborough Petes	Sandman Centre	Recap
No scoring		First period	No scoring
James Malatesta (4) – 13:36; Nathan Gaucher (2) – 15:34		Second period	9:03 – Tucker Robertson (1); 11:36 – J. R. Avon (2); 15:07 – Avery Hayes (3)
No scoring		Third period	3:37 – Connor Lockhart (1)
William Rousseau (25 saves / 29 shots); Quentin Miller (7 saves / 7 shots)		Goalie stats	Michael Simpson (26 saves / 28 shots)

May 31	Seattle Thunderbirds	6–1	Kamloops Blazers	Sandman Centre	Recap
Lucas Ciona (2) – 4:02		First period	10:50 – Ryan Hofer (2)
Jared Davidson (1) – pp – 6:39; Jordan Gustafson (2) – 6:47		Second period	No scoring
Kyle Crnkovic (4) - 5:33; Luke Prokop (1) – 6:37; Colton Dach (1) – 14:28		Third period	No scoring
Thomas Milic (30 saves / 31 shots)		Goalie stats	Dylan Ernst (36 saves / 42 shots)

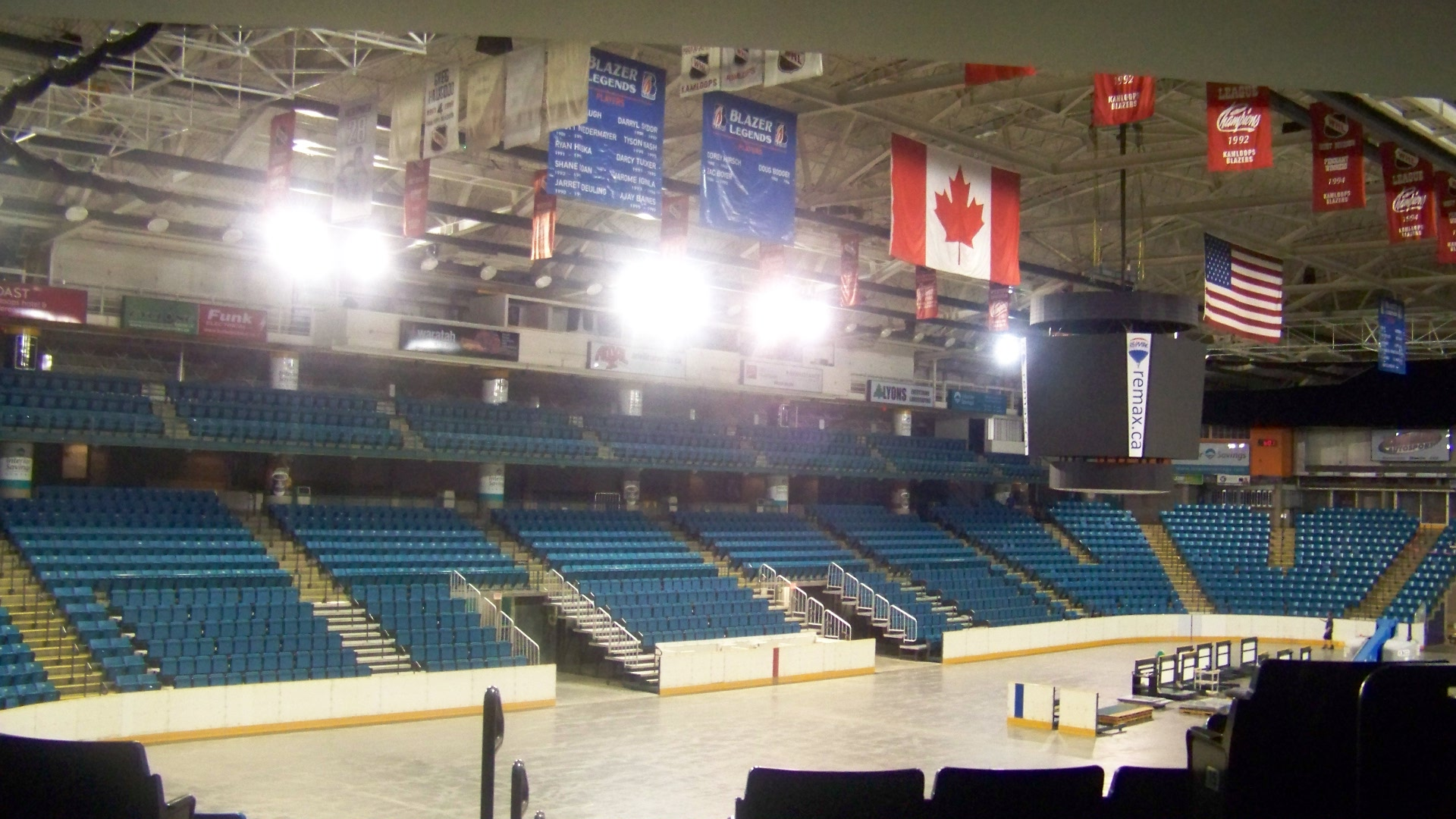
Interior of the Sandman Centre

Round-robin standings

Pos	Team	Pld	W	L	GF	GA	Pts	
1	Quebec Remparts (QMJHL)	3	2	1	13	8	4	Advanced directly to the championship game
2	Seattle Thunderbirds (WHL)	3	2	1	13	7	4	Advanced to the semifinal game
3	Peterborough Petes (OHL)	3	1	2	9	18	2	Advanced to the semifinal game
4	Kamloops Blazers (WHL/host)	3	1	2	14	16	2	

Updated to match(es) played on May 31, 2023. Source: CHLMemorialCup.ca

==== Tiebreaker ====
June 1	Peterborough Petes	5–4	OT	Kamloops Blazers	Sandman Centre	Recap
Connor Lockhart (2) – 7:52		First period		11:19 – Logan Stankoven (2); 12:45 – pp – Olen Zellweger (1); 17:33 – Harrison Brunicke (1)
Brennan Othmann (1) – 7:50; Samuel Mayer (1) – pp – 17:37; Brian Zanetti (1) – 18:50		Second period		4:23 – Logan Bairos (1)
No scoring		Third period		No scoring
J. R. Avon (3) – 10:54		First overtime period		No scoring
Michael Simpson (43 saves / 47 shots)		Goalie stats		Dylan Ernst (25 saves / 30 shots)

=== Semifinal game ===
June 2	Peterborough Petes	1–4	Seattle Thunderbirds	Sandman Centre	Recap
No scoring		First period	No scoring
No scoring		Second period	15:32 – Brad Lambert (1)
Brennan Othmann (2) – 2:41		Third period	1:28 – Colton Dach (2); 9:33 – Kyle Crnkovic (5); 17:51 – en – Nico Myatovic (1)
Michael Simpson (43 saves / 46 shots)		Goalie stats	Thomas Milic (27 saves / 28 shots)

=== Championship game ===
June 4	Seattle Thunderbirds	0–5	Quebec Remparts	Sandman Centre	Recap
No scoring		First period	6:31 – Vsevolod Komarov (1)
No scoring		Second period	8:50 – James Malatesta (5)
No scoring		Third period	12:21 – sh – Kassim Gaudet (3); 15:56 – pp – Zachary Bolduc (2); 17:55 – Charles Savoie (1)
Thomas Milic (30 saves / 35 shots)		Goalie stats	William Rousseau (32 saves / 32 shots)

== Statistical leaders ==
=== Skaters ===
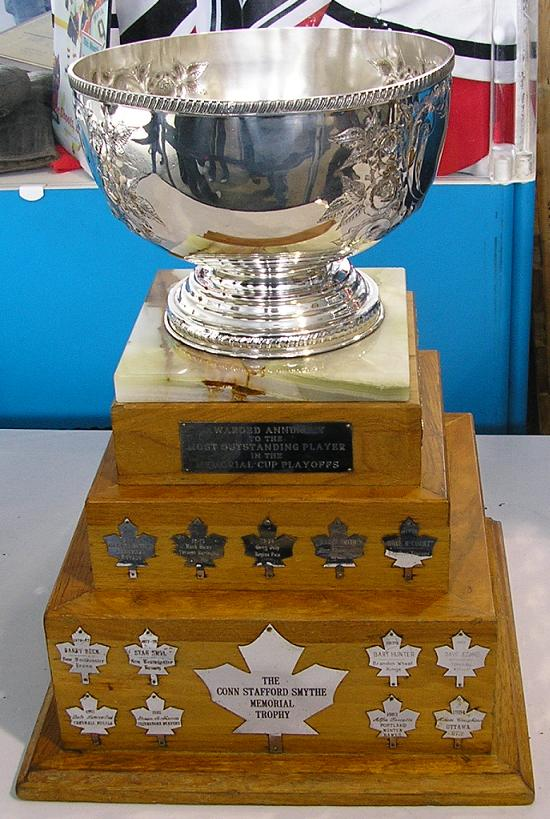
The Stafford Smythe Memorial Trophy, awarded to the most outstanding player in the Memorial Cup playoffs

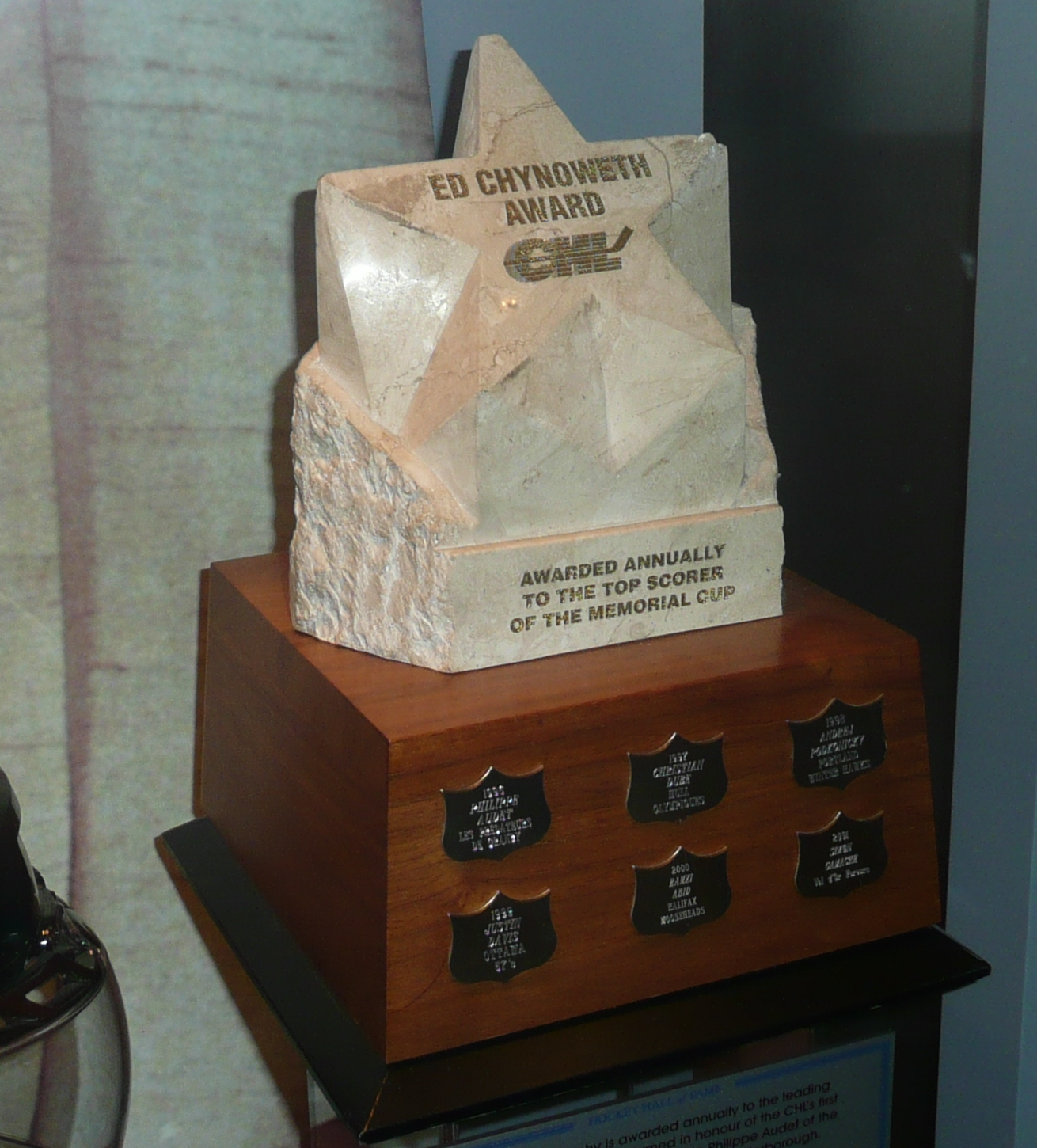
The Ed Chynoweth Trophy, awarded to the top scorer in the Memorial Cup tournament

- GP = Games played; G = Goals; A = Assists; Pts = Points; PIM = Penalty minutes

Player	Team	GP	G	A	Pts	PIM
Logan Stankoven	Kamloops Blazers	4	2	7	9	0
Kyle Crnkovic	Seattle Thunderbirds	5	5	3	8	2
Théo Rochette	Quebec Remparts	4	3	3	6	4
Zachary Bolduc	Quebec Remparts	4	2	4	6	0
Jared Davidson	Seattle Thunderbirds	5	1	5	6	0
James Malatesta	Quebec Remparts	4	5	0	5	8
Kassim Gaudet	Quebec Remparts	4	3	2	5	2
Matthew Seminoff	Kamloops Blazers	4	3	2	5	0
Ryan Hofer	Kamloops Blazers	4	2	3	5	4
Brennan Othmann	Peterborough Petes	5	2	3	5	0

=== Goaltenders ===
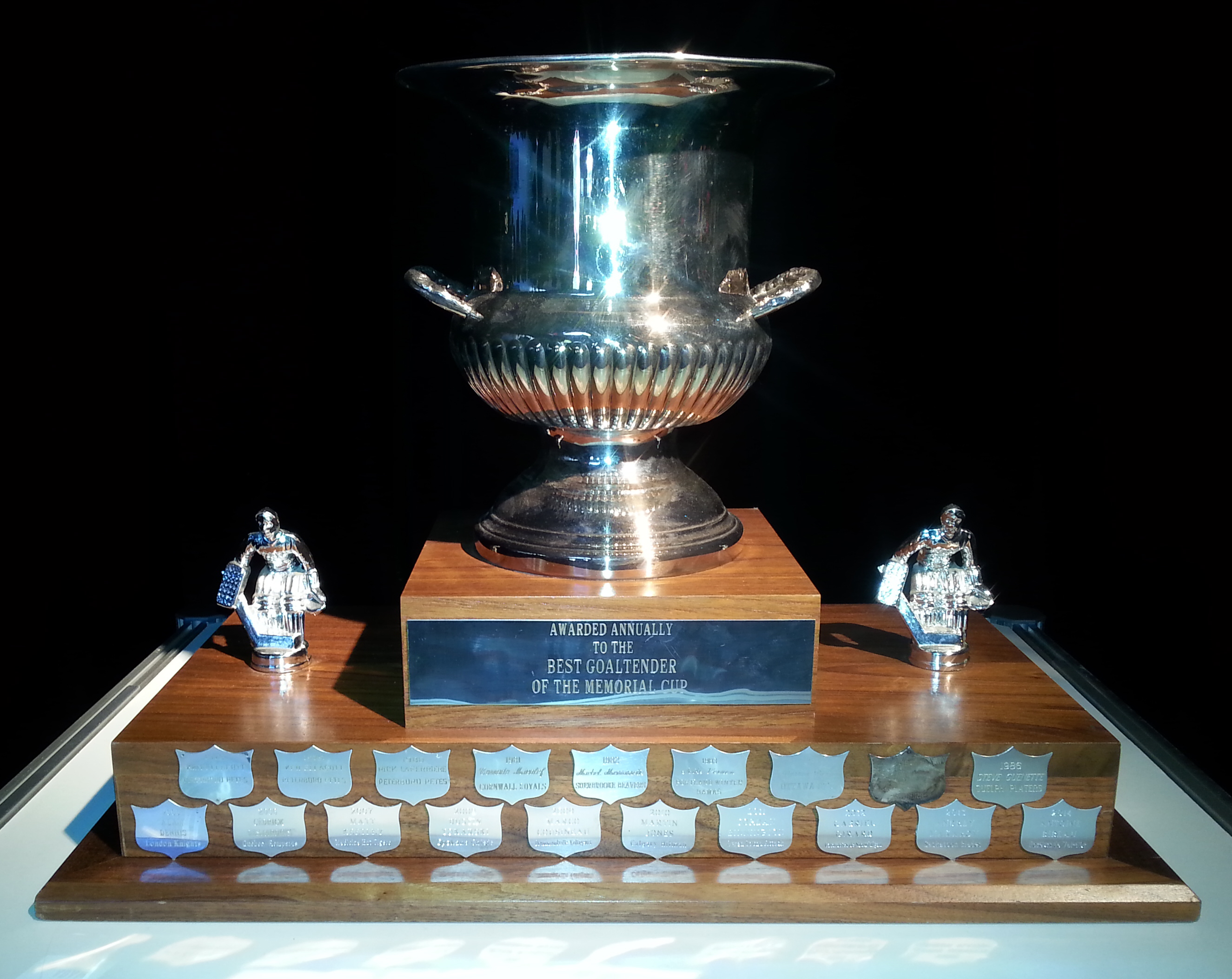
Hap Emms Memorial Trophy, awarded to the best goaltender in the Memorial Cup tournament

- GP = Games played; W = Wins; L = Losses; SA = Shots against; GA = Goals against; GAA = Goals against average; SV% = Save percentage; SO = Shutouts; TOI = Time on ice (minutes)

Player	Team	GP	W	L	OTL	SA	GA	GAA	SV%	SO	TOI
William Rousseau	Quebec Remparts	4	3	1	0	127	8	2.15	.937	1	224
Thomas Milic	Seattle Thunderbirds	5	3	2	0	141	12	2.41	.915	0	298
Michael Simpson	Peterborough Petes	5	2	3	0	180	19	4.19	.894	0	272
Dylan Ernst	Kamloops Blazers	4	1	2	1	135	21	5.06	.844	0	249

== Awards ==
The CHL handed out the following awards at the conclusion of the 2023 Memorial Cup:

2023 Memorial Cup Awards
Award	Recipient(s)
Stafford Smythe Memorial Trophy; Most outstanding player	James Malatesta, Quebec Remparts
Ed Chynoweth Trophy; Top scorer	Logan Stankoven, Kamloops Blazers
George Parsons Trophy; Most sportsmanlike player	Logan Stankoven, Kamloops Blazers
Hap Emms Memorial Trophy; Best goaltender	William Rousseau, Quebec Remparts

Memorial Cup All-Star Team
Position	Recipient
Defenceman	Olen Zellweger, Kamloops Blazers
Defenceman	Nolan Allan, Seattle Thunderbirds
Forward	James Malatesta, Quebec Remparts
Forward	Kyle Crnkovic, Seattle Thunderbirds
Forward	Théo Rochette, Quebec Remparts
Goaltender	William Rousseau, Quebec Remparts
