= Tyson Hinds =

Canadian ice hockey player (born 2003)

- Born: March 12, 2003 (age 23) Gatineau, Quebec, Canada
- Height: 6 ft 3 in (191 cm)
- Weight: 204 lb (93 kg; 14 st 8 lb)
- Position: Defenceman
- Shoots: Left
- NHL team: Anaheim Ducks
- NHL draft: 76th overall, 2021; Anaheim Ducks
- Playing career: 2023–present

Tyson Hinds (born March 12, 2003) is a Canadian professional ice hockey defenceman for the Anaheim Ducks of the National Hockey League (NHL). He was selected by the Ducks, 76th overall, in the 2021 NHL entry draft.

== Playing career ==
Hinds played major junior hockey in the Quebec Maritimes Junior Hockey League with the Shawinigan Cataractes, Rimouski Océanic and the Sherbrooke Phoenix. Selected by the Anaheim Ducks in the third-round, 76th overall, of the 2021 NHL entry draft, Hinds was later signed to a three-year, entry-level contract with the Ducks on September 28, 2022.

During the 2025–26 season, Hinds was recalled from AHL affiliate, the San Diego Gulls, and made his NHL debut with the Ducks in a 5–3 defeat to the Calgary Flames on April 4, 2026. He went scoreless through six games to end the regular season. Hinds remained on the roster for the post-season and appeared in 9 playoff contests, registering his first point, an assist, in a 7–4 victory over the Edmonton Oilers on April 24, 2026.

== Career statistics ==
=== Regular season and playoffs ===
			Regular season					Playoffs
Season	Team	League	GP	G	A	Pts	PIM	GP	G	A	Pts	PIM
2018–19	Gatineau L'Intrépide	QMAAA	38	5	4	9	20	12	1	3	4	4
2019–20	Shawinigan Cataractes	QMJHL	54	2	9	11	20	—	—	—	—	—
2020–21	Shawinigan Cataractes	QMJHL	10	0	1	1	2	—	—	—	—	—
2020–21	Rimouski Océanic	QMJHL	23	6	9	15	11	6	0	1	1	4
2021–22	Rimouski Océanic	QMJHL	23	5	11	16	18	—	—	—	—	—
2021–22	Sherbrooke Phoenix	QMJHL	38	7	12	19	20	11	1	3	4	6
2022–23	Sherbrooke Phoenix	QMJHL	56	11	43	54	24	14	2	5	7	2
2023–24	San Diego Gulls	AHL	71	2	8	10	42	—	—	—	—	—
2024–25	San Diego Gulls	AHL	71	4	14	18	42	—	—	—	—	—
2025–26	San Diego Gulls	AHL	62	5	14	19	21	—	—	—	—	—
2025–26	Anaheim Ducks	NHL	6	0	0	0	2	9	0	1	1	0
NHL totals			6	0	0	0	2	9	0	1	1	0

Medal record

Men's ice hockey

Representing Canada

World Junior Championships
Gold medal – first place	2023 Canada	

=== International ===
Year	Team	Event	Result	GP	G	A	Pts	PIM
2019	Canada White	U17	4th	5	0	1	1	0
2023	Canada	WJC	1st place, gold medalist(s)	7	2	0	2	2
Junior totals				12	2	1	3	2

== Awards and honours ==
Award	Year	Ref
QMJHL
Kevin Lowe Trophy	2023	
First All-Star Team	2023	
