= Zach Dean (ice hockey) =

Canadian ice hockey player (born 2003)

- Born: January 4, 2003 (age 23) Grande Prairie, Alberta, Canada
- Height: 6 ft 0 in (183 cm)
- Weight: 176 lb (80 kg; 12 st 8 lb)
- Position: Centre
- Shoots: Left
- NHL team (P) Cur. team: St. Louis Blues; Springfield Thunderbirds (AHL)
- NHL draft: 30th overall, 2021; Vegas Golden Knights
- Playing career: 2023–present

Zachary Dean (born January 4, 2003) is a Canadian professional ice hockey centre for the Springfield Thunderbirds of the American Hockey League (AHL) as a prospect to the St. Louis Blues of the National Hockey League (NHL). He was drafted in the first round, 30th overall, by the Vegas Golden Knights in the 2021 NHL entry draft.

== Playing career ==
Dean played minor ice hockey in Mount Pearl, Newfoundland and Labrador. On August 19, 2019, Dean signed with the Gatineau Olympiques of the Quebec Major Junior Hockey League (QMJHL). During the 2019–20 season he was named to the QMJHL All-Rookie Team. Dean was selected by the Vegas Golden Knights with the 30th overall pick in the 2021 NHL entry draft, and signed a three-year, entry-level contract on December 2, 2021. While playing with the Olympiques in the 2022–23 season, Dean was traded by the Golden Knights to the St. Louis Blues in exchange for Ivan Barbashev on February 26, 2023.

During the 2022–23 season of the QMJHL, Dean was a finalist for the Guy Carbonneau Trophy as defensive forward of the year.

== International play ==
Medal record

Representing Canada

Ice hockey

World Junior Championships
Gold medal – first place	2023 Canada	

Dean appeared for the Canada Black team at the 2019 World U-17 Hockey Challenge, recording five points in seven games.

On December 12, 2022, Dean was named to Team Canada to compete at the 2023 World Junior Ice Hockey Championships. During the tournament he recorded one goal and two assists in seven games and won a gold medal.

== Career statistics ==
=== Regular season and playoffs ===
			Regular season					Playoffs
Season	Team	League	GP	G	A	Pts	PIM	GP	G	A	Pts	PIM
2019–20	Gatineau Olympiques	QMJHL	57	18	28	46	22	—	—	—	—	—
2020–21	Gatineau Olympiques	QMJHL	23	10	10	20	20	4	1	1	2	2
2021–22	Gatineau Olympiques	QMJHL	47	21	31	52	50	7	2	5	7	6
2022–23	Gatineau Olympiques	QMJHL	50	33	37	70	53	13	10	16	26	10
2023–24	Springfield Thunderbirds	AHL	49	9	5	14	24	—	—	—	—	—
2023–24	St. Louis Blues	NHL	9	0	0	0	6	—	—	—	—	—
2024–25	Springfield Thunderbirds	AHL	11	1	3	4	2	3	1	0	1	0
2025–26	Springfield Thunderbirds	AHL	36	4	10	14	28	12	2	1	3	16
NHL totals			9	0	0	0	6	—	—	—	—	—

=== International ===
Year	Team	Event	Result	GP	G	A	Pts	PIM
2019	Canada Black	U17	8th	5	3	4	7	0
2023	Canada	WJC	1st place, gold medalist(s)	7	1	2	3	33
Junior totals				12	4	6	10	33

== Awards and honours ==
Award	Year
QMJHL
All-Rookie Team	2020

Awards and achievements
Preceded by Brendan Brisson	Vegas Golden Knights first-round draft pick 2021	Succeeded by David Edstrom
