= Stéphane Julien =

French-Canadian ice hockey player

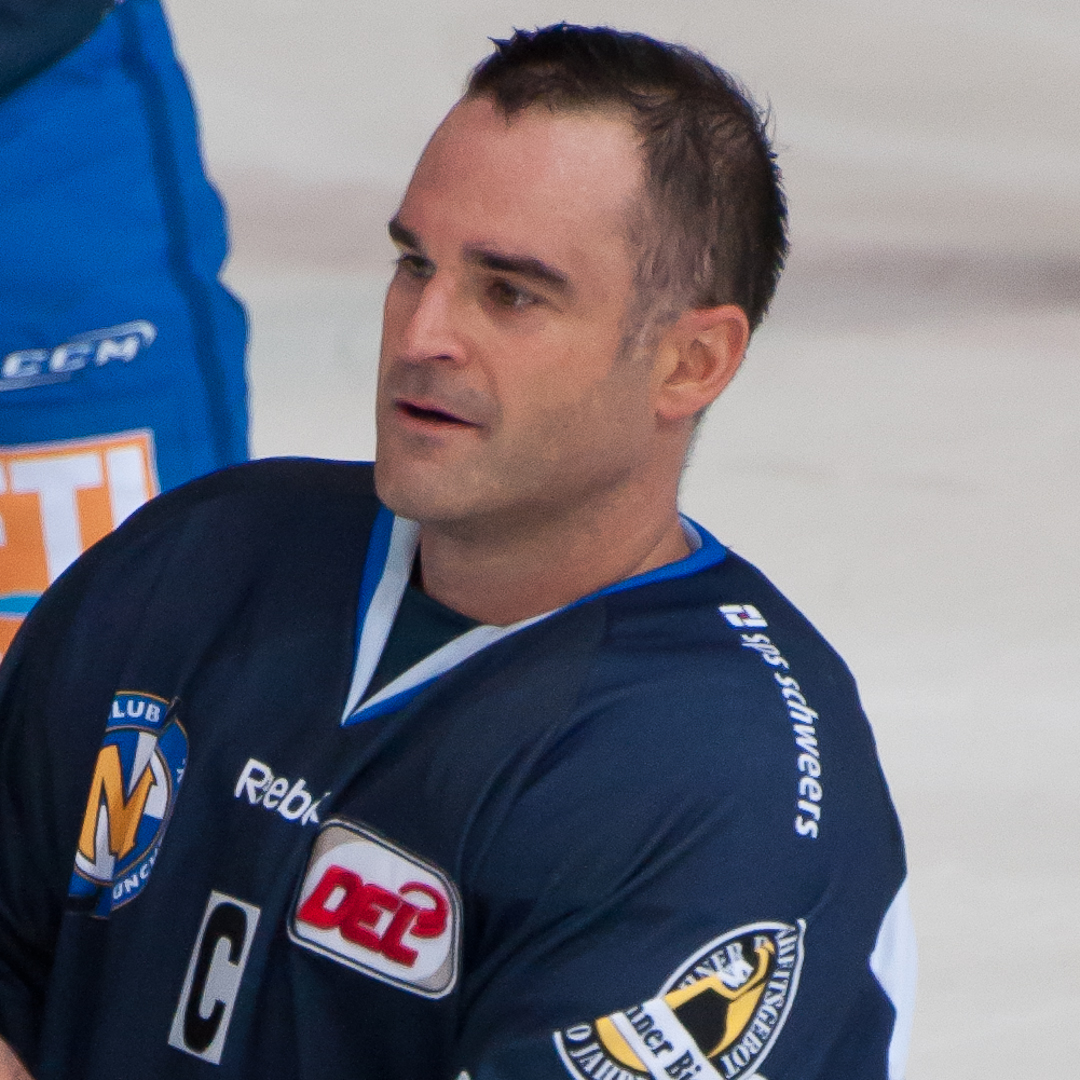
- Born: April 7, 1974 (age 52) Shawinigan, Quebec, Canada
- Height: 5 ft 11 in (180 cm)
- Weight: 194 lb (88 kg; 13 st 12 lb)
- Position: Defence
- Shot: Right
- Played for: ECHL; Pensacola Ice Pilots; DEL; Nürnberg Ice Tigers; Kölner Haie; EHC München
- NHL draft: Undrafted
- Playing career: 1995–2012

Stéphane Julien (born April 7, 1974) is a French-Canadian former professional ice hockey defenceman and current assistant coach for the Grand Rapids Griffins of the American Hockey League (AHL).

== Playing career ==
He last played with EHC München in the Deutsche Eishockey Liga (DEL) during the 2011–12 season.

== Coaching career ==
Julien served as assistant coach for the Sherbrooke Phoenix of the Quebec Major Junior Hockey League (QMJHL) from 2012 to 2016, before being named head coach midway through the 2015–16 season. During his tenure as head coach he led Sherbrooke to a 262–161–24–17 record, with three division titles and one league championship. He also won the Ron Lapointe Trophy, as QMJHL Coach of the Year, twice in 2020 and 2023.

On June 26, 2023, Julien was named an assistant coach for the Grand Rapids Griffins of the AHL.

== Career statistics ==
			Regular season					Playoffs
Season	Team	League	GP	G	A	Pts	PIM	GP	G	A	Pts	PIM
1989–90	Cantons de l'Est Cantonniers	QMAAA	3	0	0	0	0	9	1	1	2	2
1990–91	Trois-Rivières Draveurs	QMJHL	59	6	17	23	49	4	0	2	2	6
1991–92	Trois-Rivières Draveurs	QMJHL	64	13	41	54	103	15	4	7	11	11
1992–93	Sherbrooke Faucons	QMJHL	69	20	44	64	121	15	4	5	9	12
1993–94	Sherbrooke Faucons	QMJHL	67	14	43	57	110	12	2	7	9	6
1994–95	Sherbrooke Faucons	QMJHL	66	22	59	81	101	7	4	5	9	6
1995–96	Strasbourg	FRA.2	28	21	16	37	34	—	—	—	—	—
1996–97	Pensacola Ice Pilots	ECHL	69	13	25	38	91	12	2	2	4	20
1997–98	HC Varese	ITA	50	11	40	51		—	—	—	—	—
1997–98	Lausanne HC	CHE.2	6	1	4	5	16	—	—	—	—	—
1998–99	HC Fassa	ITA	16	11	10	21	22	5	3	0	3	4
1999–2000	ERC Ingolstadt	DEU.2	47	18	29	47	94	13	5	11	16	16
2000–01	HC Sierre	CHE.2	38	12	44	56	40	3	1	2	3	2
2001–02	EHC Basel	CHE.2	36	8	22	30	36	—	—	—	—	—
2001–02	HC Ajoie	CHE.2	—	—	—	—	—	8	4	6	10	10
2002–03	EHC Basel	CHE.2	21	5	19	24	18	15	6	10	16	39
2003–04	Nürnberg Ice Tigers	DEL	51	13	24	37	48	5	1	2	3	27
2004–05	Kölner Haie	DEL	52	18	29	47	52	7	2	6	8	2
2005–06	Kölner Haie	DEL	51	18	34	52	79	9	2	5	7	12
2006–07	Kölner Haie	DEL	49	16	34	50	60	9	3	5	8	12
2007–08	Kölner Haie	DEL	56	12	30	42	32	14	4	6	10	16
2008–09	Kölner Haie	DEL	44	8	25	33	48	—	—	—	—	—
2008–09	EC Salzburg	AUT	2	1	0	1	4	16	2	3	5	12
2009–10	Kölner Haie	DEL	55	5	21	26	53	3	0	2	2	4
2010–11	EHC München	DEL	52	9	29	38	44	2	1	0	1	0
2011–12	EHC München	DEL	52	5	27	32	50	—	—	—	—	—
CHE.2 totals			101	26	89	115	110	26	11	18	29	51
DEL totals			462	104	253	357	466	49	13	26	39	73
