= Zachary Bolduc =

Canadian ice hockey player (born 2003)

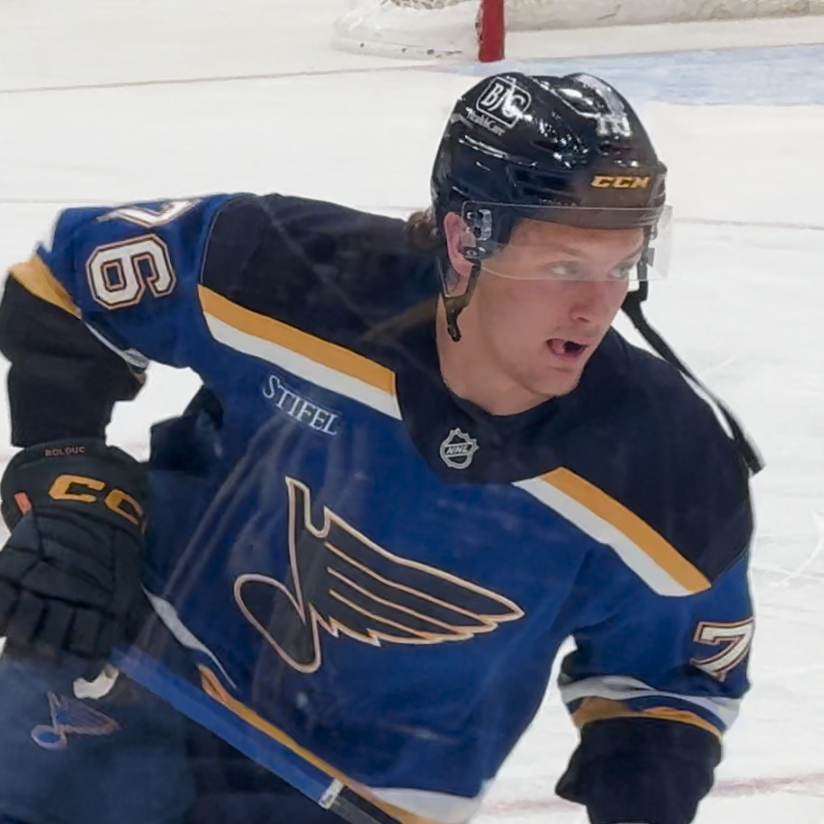
- Bolduc with the St. Louis Blues in 2024
- Born: February 24, 2003 (age 23) Trois-Rivières, Quebec, Canada
- Height: 6 ft 1 in (185 cm)
- Weight: 174 lb (79 kg; 12 st 6 lb)
- Position: Winger
- Shoots: Left
- NHL team Former teams: Montreal Canadiens; St. Louis Blues
- NHL draft: 17th overall, 2021; St. Louis Blues
- Playing career: 2023–present

Zachary Bolduc (born February 24, 2003) is a Canadian professional ice hockey player who is a winger for the Montreal Canadiens of the National Hockey League (NHL). He was selected in the first round, 17th overall, by the St. Louis Blues in the 2021 NHL entry draft.

== Playing career ==
=== Junior ===
Growing up in the Saint-Grégoire area of Bécancour, Bolduc began his junior ice hockey career with the Trois-Rivières Estacades of the Quebec Junior AAA Hockey League (QMAAA). After a successful season with the Estacades in which he registered 54 points across 42 games played, Bolduc then made two Tier I appearances with the Sioux City Musketeers of the United States Hockey League (USHL) before choosing to play major junior with the Rimouski Océanic of the Quebec Major Junior Hockey League (QMJHL) in October 2019. After leading all first-year players in goals (30) and finishing second in total points (52), he was named as the league's rookie of the year as well as recipient of the Michel Bergeron Trophy for his offensive output.

The following season, Bolduc was awarded the Michael Bossy Trophy as the QMJHL's best draft-eligible prospect. He was then selected by the St. Louis Blues of the National Hockey League (NHL) in the first round (17th overall) of the 2021 NHL entry draft and immediately signed a three-year, entry-level contract with the team.

In August 2021, Bolduc was traded to the Quebec Remparts in exchange for draft picks. Under head coach Patrick Roy, he produced consecutive 50+ goal campaigns, culminating with a QMJHL championship and ensuing Memorial Cup victory in 2022–23.

=== Professional ===
==== St. Louis Blues (2023–2025) ====
With the conclusion of his major junior career, Bolduc joined the Blues organization via their American Hockey League (AHL) affiliate, the Springfield Thunderbirds, to begin the 2023–24 season. Appearing in 48 games with the Thunderbirds, he scored eight goals and tallied 23 points before being recalled by St. Louis on February 20, 2024. Two days later, he made his NHL debut against the New York Islanders, followed by his first career NHL goal in a 6–1 loss to the Detroit Red Wings on February 24, being his 21st birthday. Bolduc's first multi-point effort came with a goal and an assist in a 5–2 win over the Chicago Blackhawks on April 10. With his team eliminated from playoff contention, he was one of three players reassigned to Springfield, capping his rookie season at five goals and nine points across 25 games for the Blues.

Securing a full-time NHL roster spot at the onset of the 2024–25 season, Bolduc had a breakout performance, scoring 19 goals and 17 assists in 72 games, including a stretch where he led all rookies in goals following completion of the league sanctioned 4 Nations Face-Off tournament held in mid-February 2025.

==== Montreal Canadiens (2025–present) ====
On July 1, 2025, Bolduc was traded by the Blues to the Montreal Canadiens in exchange for defenceman Logan Mailloux. He scored his first goal for the team in the first game of the season on October 8, a 5–2 loss to their rivals, the Toronto Maple Leafs. Bolduc was used up and down the lineup over the course of the season, and was made a healthy scratch on occasion during the second half of the campaign due to lack of production, finishing with 12 goals and 18 assists in 78 games. The Canadiens made a deep run to the conference final in the 2026 Stanley Cup playoffs, and Bolduc had seven points in 19 postseason games.

Concluding his entry-level contract, Bolduc entered the off-season as a restricted free agent, and he was tendered a qualifying offer by the Canadiens on June 29, 2026. On September 13, he signed a four-year, $16.8 million extension with the team.

== International play ==
Medal record

Men's ice hockey

Representing Canada

Canada Winter Games
Gold medal – first place	2019 Canada	

Early into his junior career, Bolduc was a member of Team Quebec at the 2019 Canada Winter Games, capturing a gold medal. Thereafter, he participated in the annual World U-17 Hockey Challenge, where his team ultimately finished in fifth place.

== Career statistics ==
=== Regular season and playoffs ===
			Regular season					Playoffs
Season	Team	League	GP	G	A	Pts	PIM	GP	G	A	Pts	PIM
2018–19	Trois-Rivières Estacades	QMAAA	42	17	37	54	34	9	3	2	5	8
2019–20	Sioux City Musketeers	USHL	2	0	0	0	0	—	—	—	—	—
2019–20	Rimouski Océanic	QMJHL	55	30	22	52	36	—	—	—	—	—
2020–21	Rimouski Océanic	QMJHL	27	10	19	29	18	—	—	—	—	—
2021–22	Quebec Remparts	QMJHL	65	55	44	99	36	12	8	4	12	6
2022–23	Quebec Remparts	QMJHL	61	50	60	110	50	18	11	8	19	8
2023–24	Springfield Thunderbirds	AHL	50	8	17	25	24	—	—	—	—	—
2023–24	St. Louis Blues	NHL	25	5	4	9	6	—	—	—	—	—
2024–25	St. Louis Blues	NHL	72	19	17	36	37	7	0	1	1	16
2024–25	Springfield Thunderbirds	AHL	4	0	2	2	2	—	—	—	—	—
2025–26	Montreal Canadiens	NHL	78	12	18	30	28	19	3	4	7	22
NHL totals			175	36	39	75	71	26	3	5	8	38

=== International ===
Year	Team	Event	Result	GP	G	A	Pts	PIM
2019	Quebec	CWG	1st place, gold medalist(s)	6	0	3	3	4
2019	Canada Red	U17	5th	5	2	3	5	10
Junior totals				5	2	3	5	10

== Awards and honours ==
Award	Year	Ref
QMJHL
All-Rookie Team	2020	
Michel Bergeron Trophy	2020	
RDS Cup	2020	
Michael Bossy Trophy	2021	
Second All-Star Team	2022, 2023	
Gilles-Courteau Trophy champion	2023	
CHL
Second All-Star Team	2023	
Memorial Cup champion	2023	

Awards and achievements
Preceded by Jake Neighbours	St. Louis Blues first-round draft pick 2021	Succeeded by Jimmy Snuggerud
