= Théo Rochette =

Swiss-Canadian ice hockey player

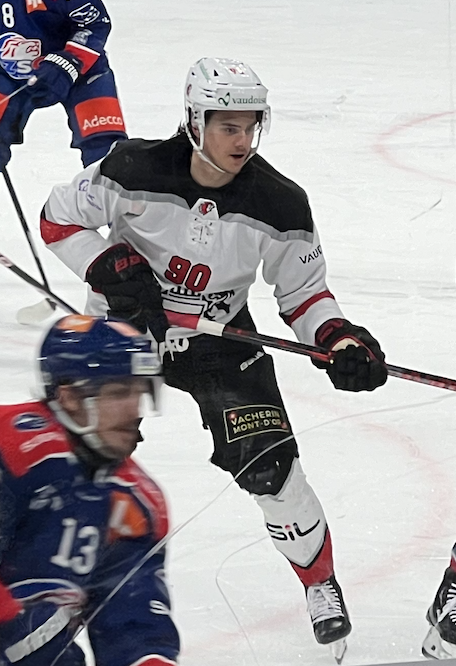
- Born: 20 February 2002 (age 24) Neuchâtel, Switzerland
- Height: 5 ft 10 in (178 cm)
- Weight: 161 lb (73 kg; 11 st 7 lb)
- Position: Forward
- Shoots: Left
- NHL team (P) Cur. team Former teams: Detroit Red Wings; Grand Rapids Griffins (AHL); Lausanne HC
- National team: Switzerland
- NHL draft: Undrafted
- Playing career: 2023–present

Théo Rochette (born February 20, 2002) is a Swiss-Canadian professional ice hockey player who is a forward for the Grand Rapids Griffins in the American Hockey League (AHL) while under contract to the Detroit Red Wings of the National Hockey League (NHL).

== Early life ==
Rochette was born in 2002 in Neuchâtel, Switzerland. His father, Stéphane Rochette, is a former National League referee from Quebec and a current ice hockey analyst.

== Playing career ==
=== Junior ===
Rochette was drafted 7th in the 2018 QMJHL entry draft by the Chicoutimi Saguenéens.

During the 2019–20 QMJHL season, Rochette was traded to the Québec Remparts. Rochette was named Captain of the Ramparts for the 2021–22 QMJHL season.

During the 2022–23 QMJHL season, Rochette scored 106 points, placing 6th among QMHJL players. The ramparts went on to win the Gilles-Courteau Trophy, qualifying them for the 2023 Memorial Cup.

On June 4, 2023, the Québec Remparts defeated the Seattle Thunderbirds in the Memorial Cup final. Rochette was named to the Memorial Cup All-Star Team.

=== Lausanne HC ===
On July 10, 2023, it was announced that Rochette would play the 2023–24 season for the Lausanne HC in the Swiss National League (NL). Rochette had played for Lausanne's junior team prior to joining the QMJHL. He was named the league's player with the greatest improvement at the end of his first season, tied with Leon Muggli from EV Zug.

On November 23, 2023, Rochette signed a two-year extension with the Lausanne HC.

On September 5, 2025 Rochette signed a five-year extension, remaining with the Lausanne HC until the end of the 2030-2031 season. Rochette was named to the 2025-26 NL All-star team.

=== Detroit Red Wings ===
On June 15, 2026, Rochette signed a one-year, entry-level contract with the Detroit Red Wings in the National Hockey League (NHL). On September 25th, during the Red Wing's training camp, he was assigned to the Grand Rapids Griffins, the American Hockey League affiliate of the Red Wings.

== International play ==
Medal record

Representing Switzerland

Ice hockey

World Championships
Silver medal – second place	2026 Switzerland	

Although Rochette has represented Switzerland for most of his playing career, he has also represented Canada at the 2019 Hlinka Gretzky Cup and the World U-17 Hockey Challenge.

Rochette represented Switzerland at the 2026 IIHF World Championship and won a silver medal.

== Career statistics ==
=== Regular season and playoffs ===
			Regular season					Playoffs
Season	Team	League	GP	G	A	Pts	PIM	GP	G	A	Pts	PIM
2018–19	Chicoutimi Saguenéens	QMJHL	59	14	29	43	18	4	4	1	5	2
2019–20	Chicoutimi Saguenéens	QMJHL	19	4	12	16	4	—	—	—	—	—
2019–20	Québec Remparts	QMJHL	30	10	13	23	16	—	—	—	—	—
2020–21	Québec Remparts	QMJHL	32	12	18	30	10	6	1	5	6	2
2021–22	Québec Remparts	QMJHL	66	33	66	99	28	12	2	7	9	2
2022–23	Québec Remparts	QMJHL	65	42	64	106	28	18	4	17	21	8
2023–24	Lausanne HC	NL	47	12	18	30	37	19	4	5	9	8
2024–25	Lausanne HC	NL	38	16	15	31	10	19	11	6	17	0
2025–26	Lausanne HC	NL	46	22	21	43	14	7	1	6	7	2
NL totals			131	50	54	104	61	45	16	17	33	10

=== International ===
Year	Team	Event	Result	GP	G	A	Pts	PIM
2018	Switzerland	HG18	8th	4	0	2	2	0
2018	Canada White	U17	6th	5	2	5	7	0
2019	Canada	HG18	2nd place, silver medalist(s)	5	0	0	0	2
2026	Switzerland	WC	2nd place, silver medalist(s)	10	3	3	6	2
Junior totals				14	2	7	9	2
Senior totals				10	3	3	6	2
