= Justin Robidas =

Canadian-American ice hockey player

- Born: March 13, 2003 (age 23) Plano, Texas, US
- Height: 5 ft 8 in (173 cm)
- Weight: 176 lb (80 kg; 12 st 8 lb)
- Position: Center
- Shoots: Right
- NHL team (P) Cur. team: Carolina Hurricanes; Chicago Wolves (AHL)
- NHL draft: 147th overall, 2021; Carolina Hurricanes
- Playing career: 2023–present

Justin Robidas (born March 13, 2003) is a Canadian-American professional ice hockey center for Chicago Wolves of the American Hockey League, on minor league assignment from the Carolina Hurricanes of the National Hockey League (NHL). Robidas' father, Stéphane Robidas, played in the NHL for 15 seasons.

== Career statistics ==
=== Regular season and playoffs ===
			Regular season					Playoffs
Season	Team	League	GP	G	A	Pts	PIM	GP	G	A	Pts	PIM
2018–19	Magog Cantonniers	QMAAA	35	28	25	53	8	14	7	15	22	0
2019–20	Val d'Or Foreurs	QMJHL	57	21	22	43	8	—	—	—	—	—
2020–21	Val d'Or Foreurs	QMJHL	35	19	17	36	4	14	3	7	10	0
2021–22	Val d'Or Foreurs	QMJHL	68	30	52	82	12	4	4	2	6	0
2022–23	Val d'Or Foreurs	QMJHL	27	14	28	42	12	—	—	—	—	—
2022–23	Quebec Remparts	QMJHL	36	11	25	36	2	18	11	16	27	2
2023–24	Norfolk Admirals	ECHL	32	12	15	27	6	—	—	—	—	—
2024–25	Chicago Wolves	AHL	70	20	35	55	10	2	0	0	0	0
2024–25	Carolina Hurricanes	NHL	2	1	1	2	0	—	—	—	—	—
2025–26	Chicago Wolves	AHL	58	23	37	60	14	21	7	9	16	12
2025–26	Carolina Hurricanes	NHL	2	0	1	1	0	—	—	—	—	—
NHL totals			4	1	2	3	0	—	—	—	—	—

=== International ===
Year	Team	Event	Result	GP	G	A	Pts	PIM
2019	Canada White	U17	4th	6	0	0	0	2
Junior totals				6	0	0	0	2
