= James Malatesta =

Canadian ice hockey player (born 2003)

- Born: May 31, 2003 (age 23) Montreal, Quebec, Canada
- Height: 5 ft 9 in (175 cm)
- Weight: 191 lb (87 kg; 13 st 9 lb)
- Position: Left wing
- Shoots: Left
- NHL team (P) Cur. team: Columbus Blue Jackets; Cleveland Monsters (AHL)
- NHL draft: 133rd overall, 2021; Columbus Blue Jackets
- Playing career: 2023–present

James Malatesta (born May 31, 2003) is a Canadian professional ice hockey left winger for the Cleveland Monsters in the American Hockey League (AHL) as a prospect to the Columbus Blue Jackets of the National Hockey League (NHL).

== Personal life ==
Malatesta was born on May 31, 2003, in Montreal, Quebec to parents Roger and Linda.

== Playing career ==
Malatesta played major junior hockey with the Quebec Remparts in the Quebec Major Junior Hockey League (QMJHL) before he was selected by the Columbus Blue Jackets in the fifth-round, 133rd overall, of the 2021 NHL entry draft.

During his final junior season with the Remparts in 2022–23, Malatesta was signed to a three-year, entry-level contract with the Blue Jackets on December 1, 2022.

== International play ==
Malatesta was a member of Team Canada Black at the 2019 World U-17 Hockey Challenge, playing five games with three goals and three assists.

== Career statistics ==
=== Regular season and playoffs ===
			Regular season					Playoffs
Season	Team	League	GP	G	A	Pts	PIM	GP	G	A	Pts	PIM
2018–19	Lac St-Louis Lions	QMAAA	22	7	5	12	52	16	11	12	23	24
2019–20	Quebec Remparts	QMJHL	59	23	22	45	29	—	—	—	—	—
2020–21	Quebec Remparts	QMJHL	32	10	13	23	12	6	3	1	4	2
2021–22	Quebec Remparts	QMJHL	68	28	25	53	49	12	5	3	8	14
2022–23	Quebec Remparts	QMJHL	55	37	29	66	64	18	14	6	20	16
2023–24	Cleveland Monsters	AHL	56	12	10	22	79	9	1	1	2	2
2023–24	Columbus Blue Jackets	NHL	11	2	2	4	5	—	—	—	—	—
2024–25	Cleveland Monsters	AHL	41	8	6	14	49	6	1	0	1	10
2024–25	Columbus Blue Jackets	NHL	2	0	0	0	0	—	—	—	—	—
2025–26	Cleveland Monsters	AHL	57	10	8	18	87	1	0	0	0	0
NHL totals			13	2	2	4	5	—	—	—	—	—

=== International ===
Year	Team	Event	Result	GP	G	A	Pts	PIM
2019	Canada Black	U17	8th	5	3	3	6	14
Junior totals				5	3	3	6	14
