= Patrik Hamrla =

Czech ice hockey player (born 2003)

- Born: May 21, 2003 (age 22) Zlín, Czech Republic
- Height: 6 ft 3 in (191 cm)
- Weight: 194 lb (88 kg; 13 st 12 lb)
- Position: Goaltender
- Catches: Left
- Liiga team (P) Cur. team Former teams: Ilves; KOOVEE (Mestis); HC Energie Karlovy Vary
- NHL draft: 83rd overall, 2021; Carolina Hurricanes
- Playing career: 2020–present

Patrik Hamrla (born May 21, 2003) is a Czech professional ice hockey goaltender who plays under contract for Ilves Tampere in the Liiga. He was drafted by the Carolina Hurricanes in the third round of the 2021 NHL entry draft with the 83rd overall pick in the draft.
