= Centre Slush Puppie =

Indoor arena in Gatineau, Quebec

Coordinates: 45.48344554°N 75.68020669°W

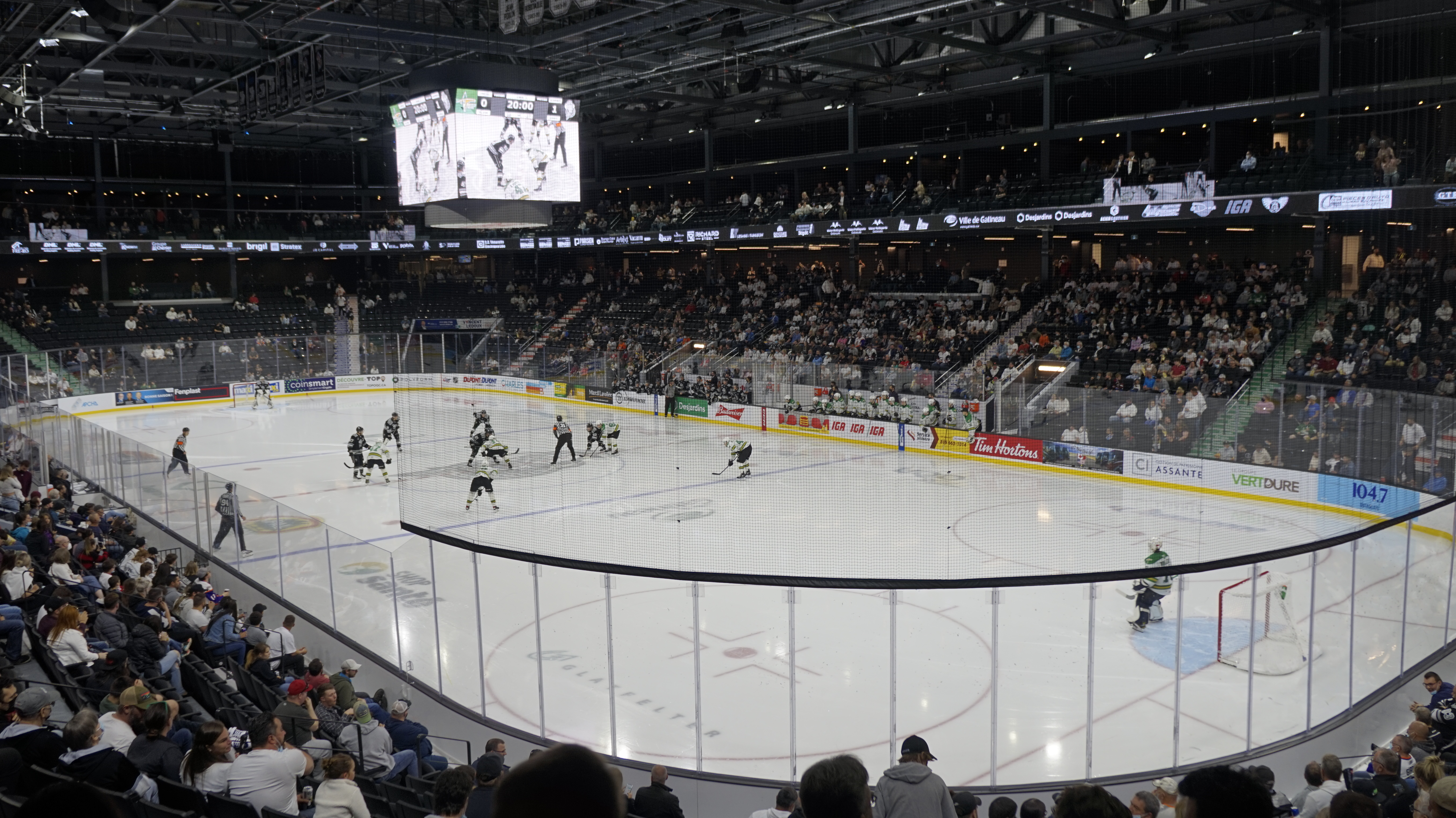
- The Gatineau Olympiques hosting the Val-d'Or Foreurs in May 2022.
- Interactive map of Centre Slush Puppie
- Location: 500, boulevard de la Cité; Gatineau, Quebec; J8T 0H3
- Owner: City of Gatineau
- Operator: Vision Multisports Outaouais
- Capacity: 4,080 (5,000 with standing room)

Construction
- Groundbreaking: 2017
- Opened: 2021

Tenant
- Gatineau Olympiques (QMJHL) (2021–present)

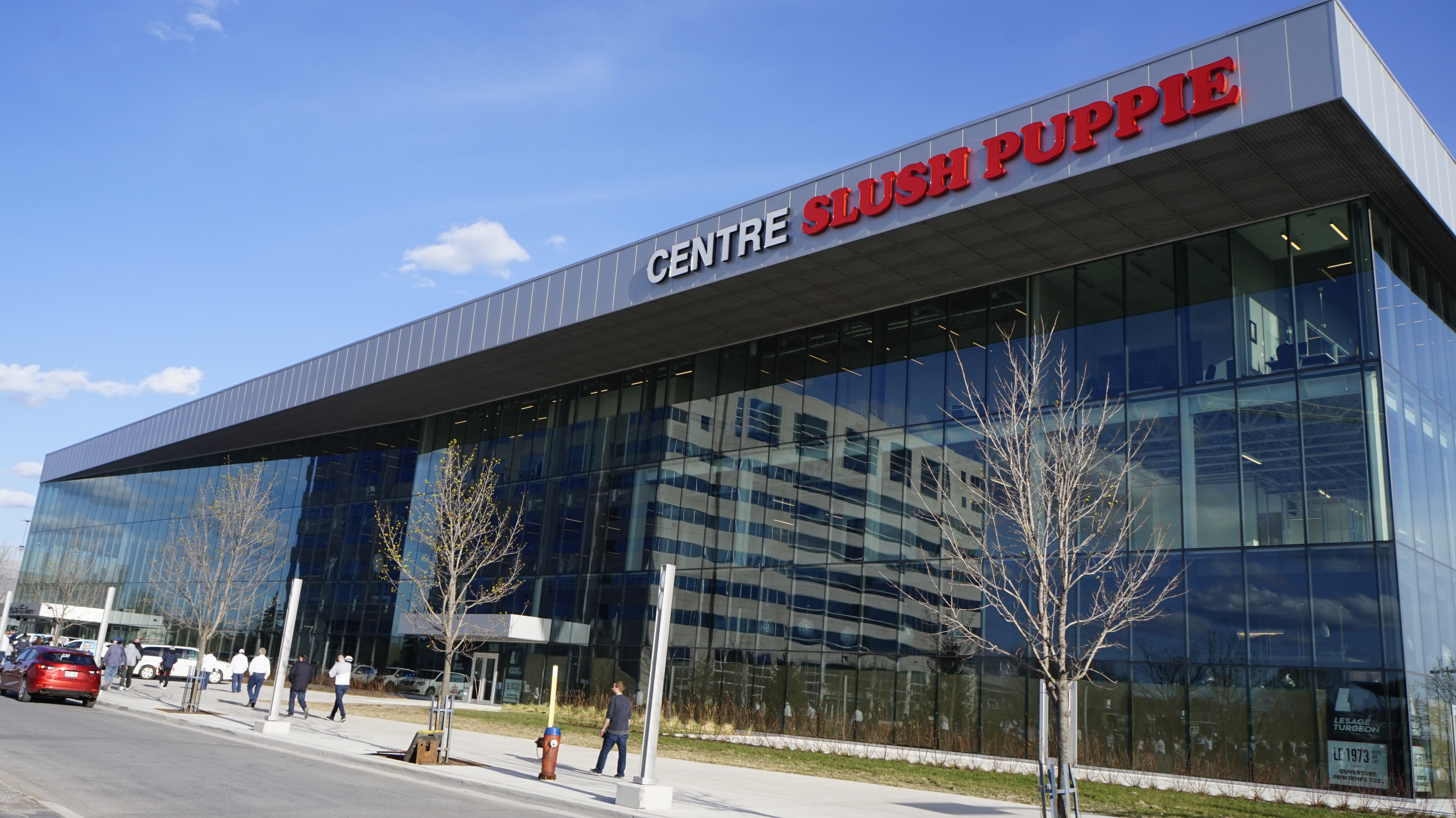
The entrance of the facility

Centre Slush Puppie is a 4,080-seat arena in Gatineau, Quebec, Canada. It is home to the Gatineau Olympiques of the Quebec Maritimes Junior Hockey League (QMJHL). Naming rights for the centre are held by Slush Puppie. The centre also hosts three community rinks, Glace Desjardins, Glace Gérik Construction, and Glace Dilawri Auto, which each have a capacity between 240 and 480.

== History ==
On February 22, 2017, Gatineau City Council approved the construction of a CA$79 million sports facility arena to replace the Robert Guertin Centre. The centre opened on August 20, 2021.

In April 2023, the centre hosted three Ottawa 67's playoff games, when the TD Place Arena was hosting the 2023 World Men's Curling Championship.
