= Sandman Centre =

Multi-use indoor arena in Kamloops, British Columbia

Coordinates: 50°40′42″N 120°19′59″W

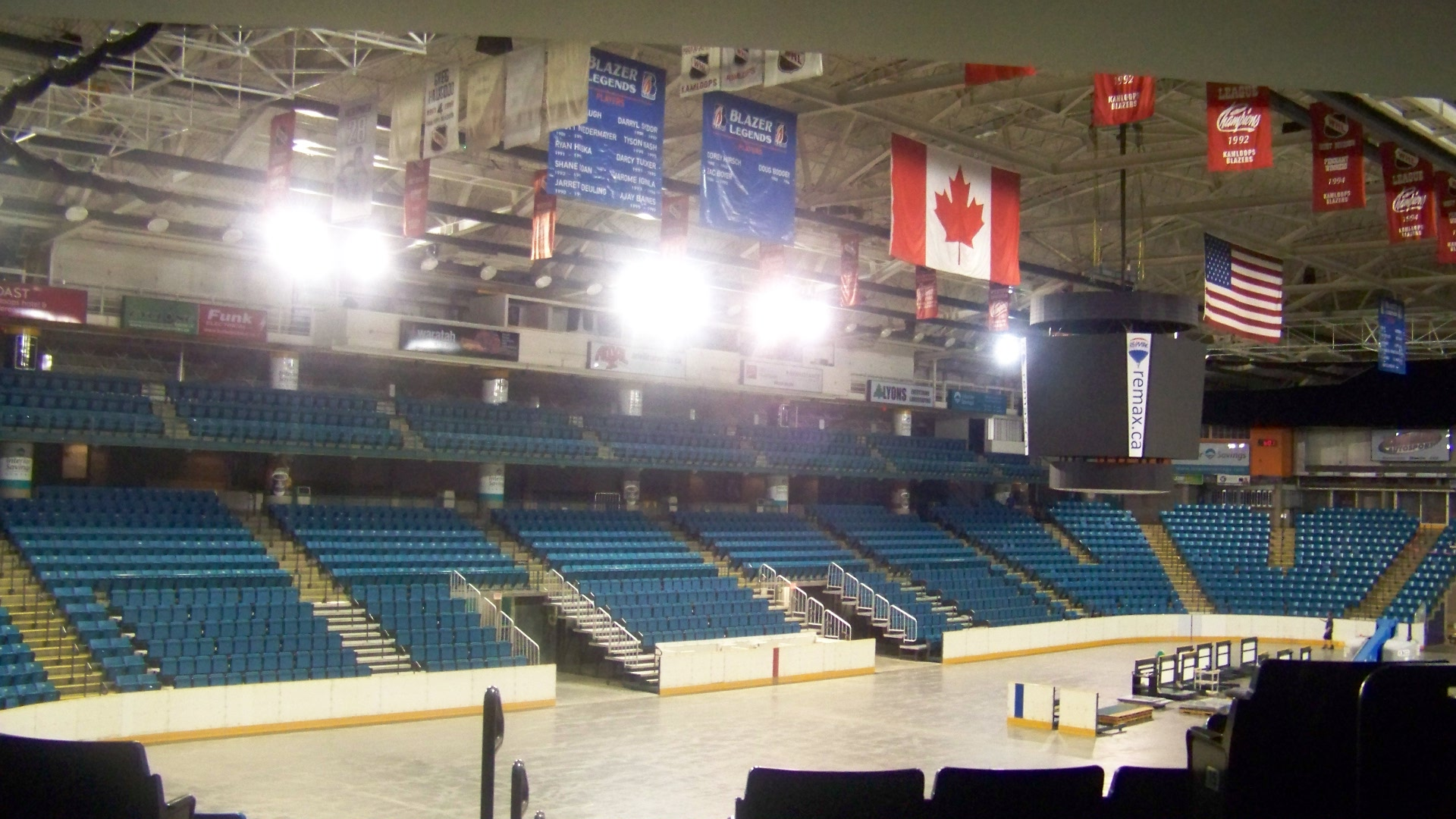
- The interior as seen in June 2015

- Location within British Columbia Location within Canada
- Former names: Riverside Coliseum (1992–2000); Sport Mart Place (2000–2005); Interior Savings Centre (2005–2015)
- Location: 300 Mark Recchi Way; Kamloops, British Columbia; V2C 1W3
- Owner: City of Kamloops
- Capacity: Ice Hockey: 5,464; Concerts 6,000+
- Surface: Multi-surface

Construction
- Groundbreaking: September 1990
- Opened: August 8, 1992
- Cost: C$18.5 million ($36.2 million in 2025 dollars)
- Architects: PBK Architects, Inc. Hotson Bakker Architects
- General contractors: D&T Developments, Ltd.

Tenant
- Kamloops Blazers (WHL) (1992–present)

The Sandman Centre (formerly known as Riverside Coliseum and Interior Savings Centre) is a 5,464-seat multi-purpose arena in Kamloops, British Columbia, Canada. It is home to the Kamloops Blazers ice hockey team. The arena is owned by the City of Kamloops. The current naming rights holder is Sandman Hotels.

The Arena is located on Mark Recchi Way, named after the NHL player whose hometown and home team (Blazers) is in Kamloops.

The Sandman Centre was constructed to replace the Kamloops Memorial Arena, built in 1948 and now a historical landmark. The Sandman Centre opened as the Riverside Coliseum in 1992. The Riverside Coliseum was later called Sport Mart Place due to a sponsorship deal with Sport Mart. The deal between Sport Mart and the City of Kamloops expired during the summer of 2005 and a new sponsorship deal resulted in the commercial name Interior Savings Centre.

In the summer and fall of 2005, the Kamloops Blazers Hockey Club, City of Kamloops, and several corporate sponsors constructed new private box seats, increasing the arena's capacity by hundreds of seats.

== Notable events ==
The arena has hosted many concerts. Avril Lavigne performed at the arena during her Best Damn Tour and The Black Star Tour. On April 2, 1999, Shania Twain performed there during her Come On Over Tour. Other artists include Bob Dylan, Nickelback, Kiss, Alice Cooper, The Cult, Hedley, Dierks Bentley, Rita MacNeil, Florida Georgia Line, George Thorogood, Reba McEntire, Nelly Furtado, Backstreet Boys, Sarah Mclachlan, Def Leppard, Keith Urban, Jason Aldean, Bryan Adams, Tom Cochrane, Johnny Reid, Dallas Smith, The Band Perry, Terri Clark, Brad Paisley, Tanya Tucker, The Beach Boys, The Black Crowes, George Jones, k-os, Loverboy, Billy Talent, Vince Gill, Merle Haggard, Colin James, Doobie Brothers, Trooper, Swollen Members, Snoop Dogg, Carolyn Dawn Johnson, Bif Naked, Smash Mouth, Default, Big Sugar, Alabama, Nitty Gritty Dirt Band, David Usher, 54-40, Chantal Kreviazuk, Barenaked Ladies, The Guess Who, and Rascal Flatts.

The arena hosted the 2014 Tim Hortons Brier from March 1–9, and hosted the 2023 Scotties Tournament of Hearts from February 17–26.

In 2016, the arena hosted the 2016 IIHF Women's World Championship. From May 26 to June 4, the arena hosted the 2023 Memorial Cup Canadian national major junior hockey championship tournament.

During the 2017 British Columbia wildfires, Emergency Social Services used the arena as an overnight evacuation centre when residents of the city of Williams Lake were given a mandatory evacuation order.

The arena was a host city for the Western Hockey League's BC Division during the shortened 2021 season; play began on March 26, and ended on May 12.
