= Sherbrooke Phoenix =

Junior ice hockey team in Sherbrooke, Quebec

Sherbrooke Phoenix Phoenix de Sherbrooke
- City: Sherbrooke, Quebec
- League: Quebec Maritimes Junior Hockey League
- Conference: Western
- Division: Central
- Founded: 2012
- Home arena: Palais des Sports Léopold-Drolet
- Colours: Navy blue, baby blue, and white
- General manager: Philippe Sauve
- Head coach: Gilles Bouchard
- Website: chl.ca/lhjmq-phoenix/

The Sherbrooke Phoenix are a Canadian junior ice hockey team based in Sherbrooke, Quebec, that plays in the Quebec Maritimes Junior Hockey League (QMJHL). The team plays its home games at the Palais des Sports Léopold-Drolet.

== History ==
The franchise was granted as a replacement for the Lewiston Maineiacs, which folded at the end of the 2010–11 QMJHL season. On May 31, 2011, the Quebec Major Junior Hockey League held a conference call to prepare an offer to purchase the team from Mark Just for 3.5 million dollars. The dissolved Maineiacs franchise were the Sherbrooke Castors prior to relocating to Lewiston, Maine, prior to the start of the 2003–04 QMJHL season. The Phoenix marks the city's third attempt at a QMJHL franchise. On May 22, 2012, the Phoenix named former Champlain College Cougars head coach Judes Vallée the franchise's first head coach.

The Phoenix made their inaugural draft selection in the QMJHL Bantam Draft, selecting Daniel Audette with the franchise's first-ever draft pick. Audette is the son of former Buffalo Sabres forward Donald Audette. The Phoenix filled out their roster in an expansion draft. The Phoenix played the franchise's inaugural game against the Victoriaville Tigres on September 7, 2012, defeating the Tigres 4-2 in Victoriaville. Jeremie Beaudry scored the franchise's first regular season goal, while Daniel Audette recorded the first regular season assist. Beaudry's stay in Sherbrooke was, however, short-lived, as he was traded to the Quebec Remparts three months later. On January 13, 2013, the Phoenix recorded the franchise's first-ever shutout against the two-time league champion Saint John Sea Dogs. The Phoenix finished their inaugural season with a 21-38-3-6 record, which was good enough for 15th place in the QMJHL, which allowed them to make the playoffs for the first time. The excitement, however, was short-lived, as the team was swept out in the first round by the second-seeded Baie-Comeau Drakkar, being outscored 27–7 in the series. Michael McNamee scored the Phoenix franchise's first-ever playoff goal, while Brandon Lesway and Denis Kamaev recorded the first playoff assists in franchise history.

== Team results ==
Note: GP = Games played, W = Wins, L = Losses, OTL = Overtime losses, SL = Shootout Losses, Pts = Points, GF = Goals for, GA = Goals against, PIM = Penalties in minutes, Finish = Finish in Division, Playoffs = Results in playoffs

Season	GP	W	L	OTL	SL	Pts	GF	GA	PIM	Finish	Playoffs
2012–13	68	21	38	3	6	51	188	282	966	6th, Telus West	Lost first round vs. Baie-Comeau 0–4
2013–14	68	16	43	4	5	41	180	300	1125	6th, Telus West	Did not qualify
2014–15	68	36	26	2	4	78	228	245	949	3rd, Telus West	Lost first round vs. Charlottetown 2–4
2015–16	68	24	35	7	2	57	207	241	921	5th, Telus West	Lost first round vs. Shawinigan 1–4
2016–17	68	26	38	1	3	56	214	268	715	6th, Telus West	Did not qualify
2017–18	68	34	23	7	4	79	228	234	690	4th, Telus West	Won first round vs. Rouyn-Noranda 4–3; Lost second round vs. Acadie–Bathurst 0–4
2018–19	68	36	27	2	3	77	249	247	566	2nd, Central	Won first round vs. Blainville-Boisbriand 4–1; Lost second round vs. Drummondville 4–1
2019–20	63	51	8	3	1	106	290	164	747	1st, Central	QMJHL playoffs cancelled
2020–21	27	8	17	1	1	18	68	105	45	6th, West	Lost first round vs. Chicoutimi 0–3
2021–22	68	46	17	2	3	97	274	202	719	1st, Central	Won first round vs. Baie-Comeau 3–1; Won second round vs. Blainville-Boisbriand 3–0; Lost third round vs. Charlottetown 1–3
2022–23	68	50	13	3	2	105	317	172	765	1st, Central	Won first round vs. Blainville-Boisbriand 4–0; Won second round vs. Drummondville 4–0; Lost third round vs. Halifax 2–4
2023–24	68	32	30	1	5	70	215	239	735	3rd, Central	Won first round vs. Blainville-Boisbriand 4–3; Lost second round vs. Drummondville 2–4
2024–25	64	33	25	2	4	72	201	201	719	3rd, Central	Won first round vs. Blainville-Boisbriand 4–1; Lost second round vs. Shawinigan 0–4
2025–26	64	33	26	5	0	71	210	214	809	5th, Western	Lost first round vs. Shawinigan 3–4

== NHL alumni ==
- Samuel Bolduc
- Maxime Lagacé
- Mathieu Olivier
- Sam Poulin
- Jeffrey Viel
