= 2019 World U-17 Hockey Challenge =

Tournament details
- Host country: Canada
- Venues: 2 (in 2 host cities)
- Dates: November 2 – November 9
- Teams: 8

The 2019 World Under-17 Hockey Challenge was an ice hockey tournament that was held in Swift Current, Saskatchewan and Medicine Hat, Alberta, Canada from November 2 to November 9. The World Under-17 Hockey Challenge is held by Hockey Canada annually to showcase young hockey talent from Canada and other strong hockey countries.

The round-robin and knockout games were hosted at Innovation Credit Union iPlex in Swift Current and Canalta Centre in Medicine Hat, and the latter hosted the bronze and gold medal games.

== Final standings ==
	Team
1st place, gold medalist(s)	Russia
2nd place, silver medalist(s)	United States
3rd place, bronze medalist(s)	Czech Republic
4	Canada White
5	Canada Red
6	Sweden
7	Finland
8	Canada Black
