= 2021 NHL entry draft =

National Hockey League selection of newly eligible players

General information
- Date: July 23–24, 2021
- Location: NHL Network studios, Secaucus, New Jersey, U.S. (draft held via video conference call)
- Networks: Sportsnet (Canada); ESPN2 (United States)

Overview
- 224 total selections in 7 rounds
- First selection: (Canada) Owen Power (Buffalo Sabres)

The 2021 NHL entry draft was the 59th draft for the National Hockey League. It was held on July 23–24, 2021, delayed by one month from its normally scheduled time of June due to the COVID-19 pandemic and the later-than-normal finish of the 2020–21 NHL season. It was thus the first draft held in July since 2005. For the second year in a row, the event was held in a remote format, with teams convening via videoconferencing, and Commissioner Gary Bettman announcing the selections in the opening round and deputy commissioner Bill Daly in all subsequent rounds from the NHL Network studios in Secaucus, New Jersey.

The first three selections were Owen Power by the Buffalo Sabres, Matty Beniers by the Seattle Kraken, and Mason McTavish by the Anaheim Ducks.

== Eligibility ==
Ice hockey players born between January 1, 2001, and September 15, 2003, were eligible for selection in the 2021 NHL entry draft. Additionally, un-drafted, non-North American players born in 2000 were eligible for the draft; and those players who were drafted in the 2019 NHL entry draft, but not signed by an NHL team and who were born after June 30, 2001, were also eligible to re-enter the draft.

== Draft lottery ==
External videos
- Commissioner Bettman draws 2021 Draft lottery, NHL.com. June 2, 2021.

From the 2012–13 NHL season up to the 2020–21 NHL season all teams not qualifying for the Stanley Cup playoffs have had a "weighted" chance at winning the first overall selection. Beginning with the 2014–15 NHL season, the league changed the weighting system that was used in previous years. Under the new system, the odds of winning the draft lottery for the four lowest finishing teams in the league decreased. In contrast, the odds for the other non-playoff teams increased. The draft lottery took place on June 2, 2021. After changing the number of lottery drawings earlier in the season, the first two picks overall in this draft were awarded by lottery. The Buffalo Sabres and Seattle Kraken won the two draft lotteries that took place on June 2, 2021, giving them the first and second picks overall. Buffalo retained the first pick, while Seattle moved up one spot, and Anaheim dropped one spot to third overall.

The expansion Seattle Kraken had the same odds of winning the lottery as the team that finished with the third fewest points (this ended up being the New Jersey Devils). Because the Arizona Coyotes' 2021 first-round pick was forfeited as the result of a penalty sanction due to violations of the NHL Combine Testing Policy during the 2019–20 NHL season, Arizona's lottery odds were instead listed as re-draws.

Indicates team won first overall
Indicates team won second overall
Indicates teams that did not win a lottery

Complete draft position odds
Team	1st	2nd	3rd	4th	5th	6th	7th	8th	9th	10th	11th	12th	13th	14th	15th	16th
Buffalo	16.6%	15.0%	68.4%													
Anaheim	12.1%	11.7%	26.9%	49.3%												
Seattle	10.3%	10.2%	4.7%	39.3%	35.6%											
New Jersey	10.3%	10.2%		11.5%	43.9%	24.2%										
Columbus	8.5%	8.6%			20.6%	45.8%	16.5%									
Detroit	7.6%	7.8%				30.0%	43.8%	10.9%								
San Jose	6.7%	6.9%					39.7%	39.7%	6.9%							
Los Angeles	5.8%	6.0%						49.4%	34.5%	4.3%						
Vancouver	5.4%	5.7%							58.6%	28.0%	2.4%					
Ottawa	4.5%	4.8%								67.7%	21.8%	1.2%				
Arizona	3.1%	3.3%									75.9%	17.1%	0.7%			
Chicago	2.7%	2.9%										81.7%	12.4%	0.3%		
Calgary	2.2%	2.4%											87.0%	8.4%	0.1%	
Philadelphia	1.8%	2.0%												91.3%	4.9%	>0.0%
Dallas	1.4%	1.5%													95.0%	2.1%
NY Rangers	1.0%	1.1%														97.9%

== Top prospects ==
Source: NHL Central Scouting (May 27, 2021) ranking.

Ranking	North American skaters	European skaters
1	(Canada) Owen Power (D)	(Sweden) William Eklund (LW)
2	(Canada) Mason McTavish (C)	(Sweden) Simon Edvinsson (D)
3	(Canada) Kent Johnson (C)	(Finland) Aatu Raty (C)
4	(United States) Luke Hughes (D)	(Russia) Nikita Chibrikov (RW)
5	(Canada) Dylan Guenther (RW)	(Russia) Daniil Chayka (D)
6	(United States) Matty Beniers (C)	(Russia) Fedor Svechkov (C)
7	(Canada) Brandt Clarke (D)	(Russia) Aleksandr Kisakov (LW)
8	(Canada) Brennan Othmann (LW)	(Sweden) Isak Rosen (RW)
9	(United States) Matthew Coronato (RW)	(Sweden) Fabian Lysell (RW)
10	(Canada) Cole Sillinger (C)	(Finland) Samu Tuomaala (RW)

Ranking	North American goalies	European goalies
1	(Canada) Sebastian Cossa	(Sweden) Jesper Wallstedt
2	(Canada) Benjamin Gaudreau	(Belarus) Aleksei Kolosov
3	(Canada) Tristan Lennox	(Czech Republic) Patrik Hamrla

== Selections by round ==
The order of the 2021 entry draft is listed below.

=== Round one ===
= NHL All-Star team ·	= NHL All-Star (Note: Players are identified as an All-Star if they were selected for the All-Star game at any time in their career.) ·	= NHL All-Star and NHL All-Star team ·

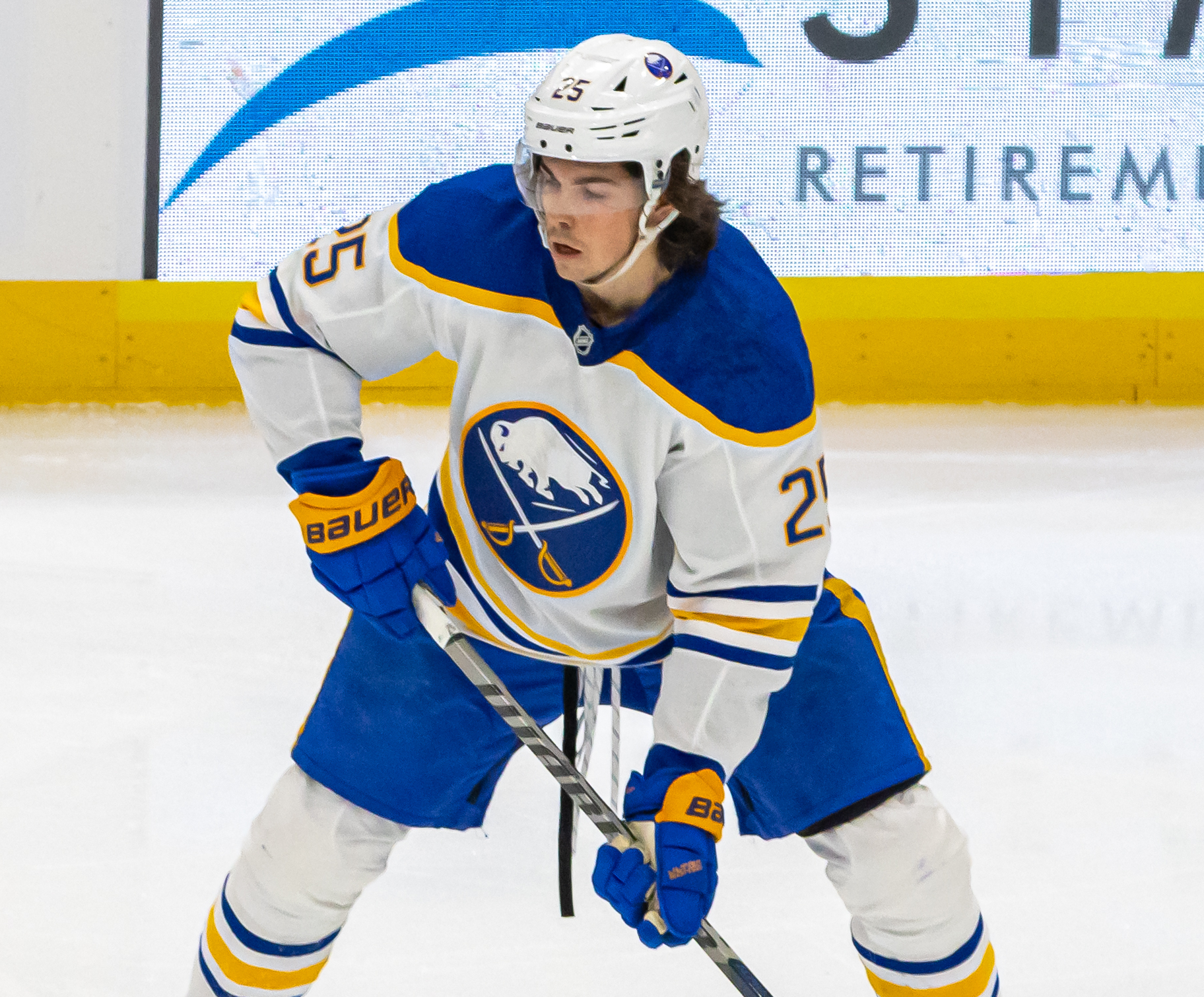
Owen Power was selected first overall by the Buffalo Sabres.

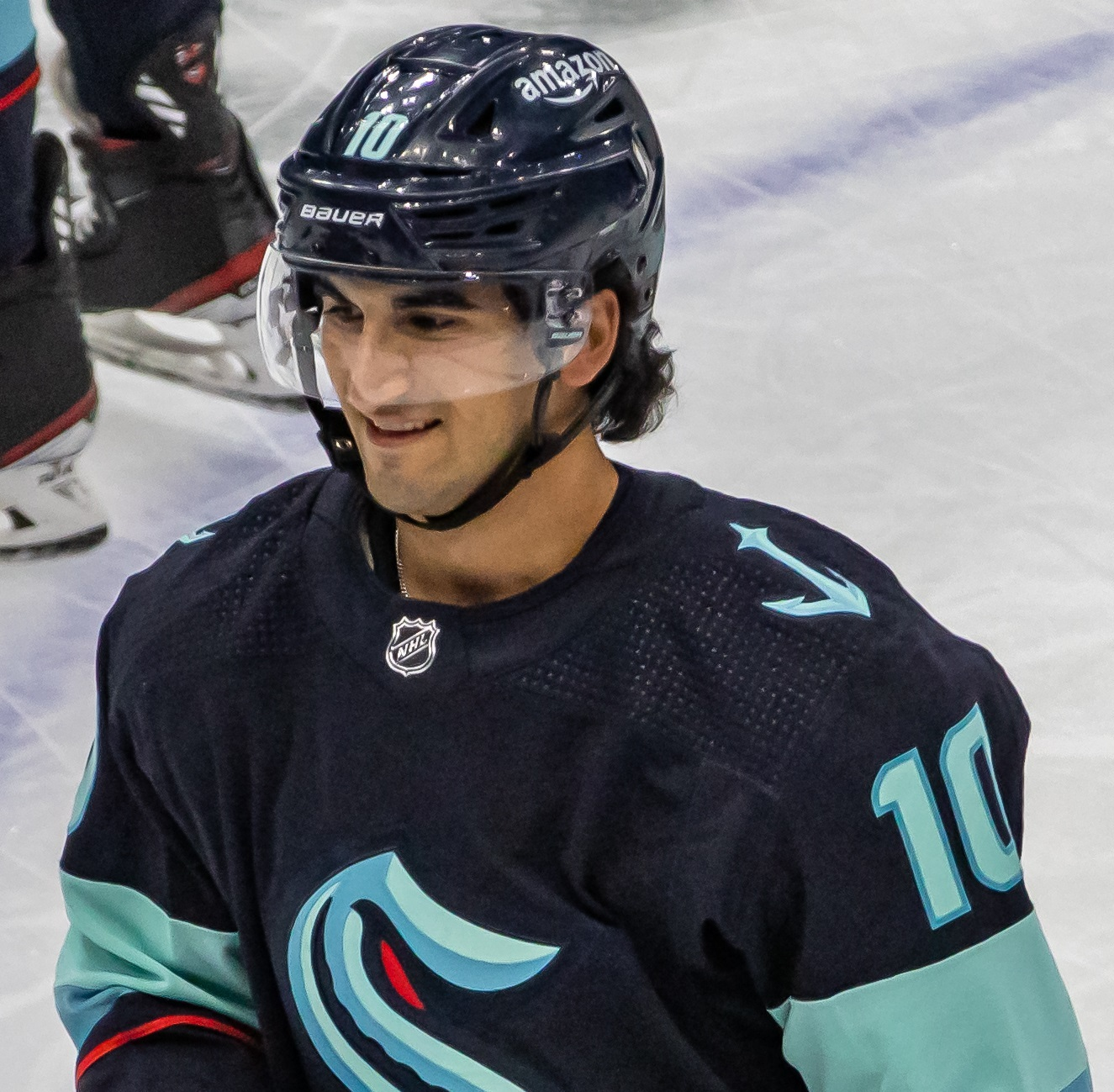
Matty Beniers was selected second overall by the Seattle Kraken.

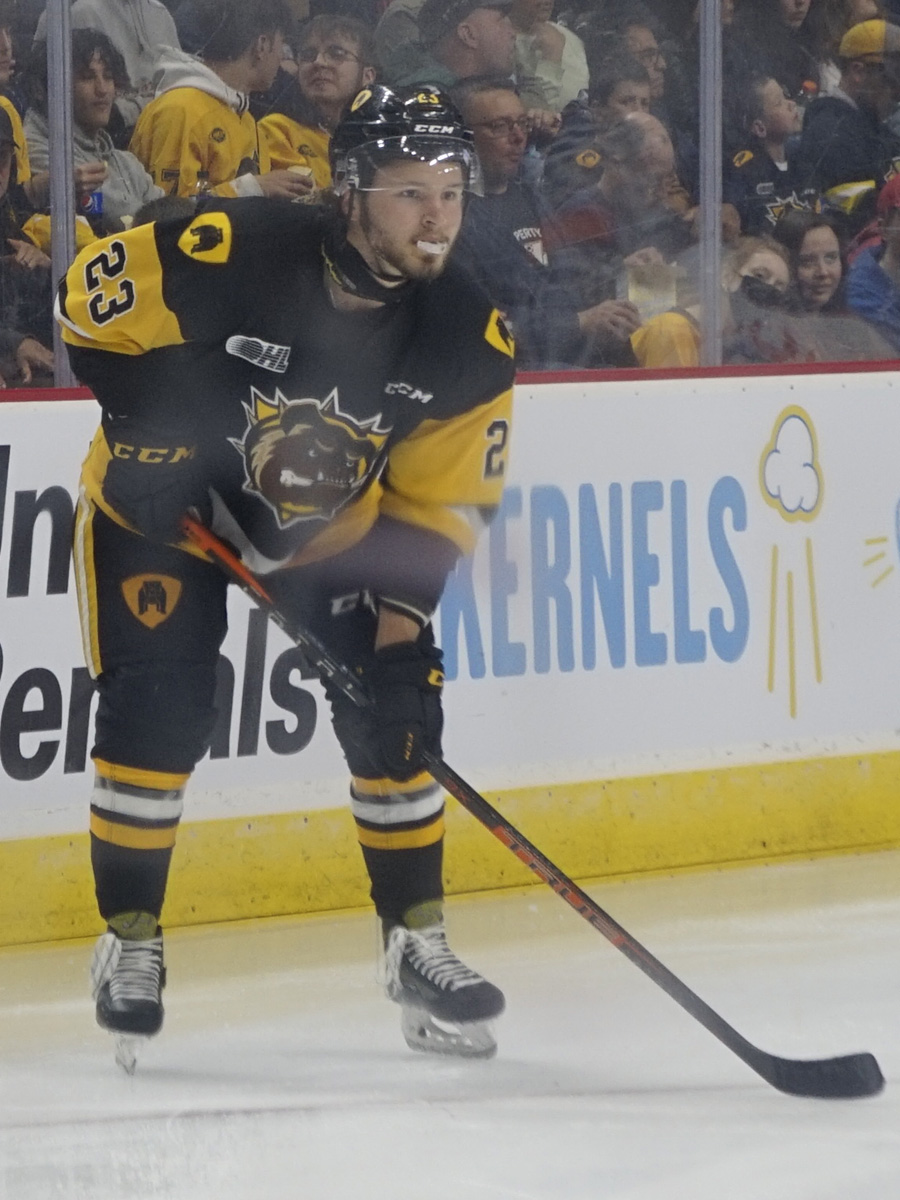
Mason McTavish was selected third overall by the Anaheim Ducks.

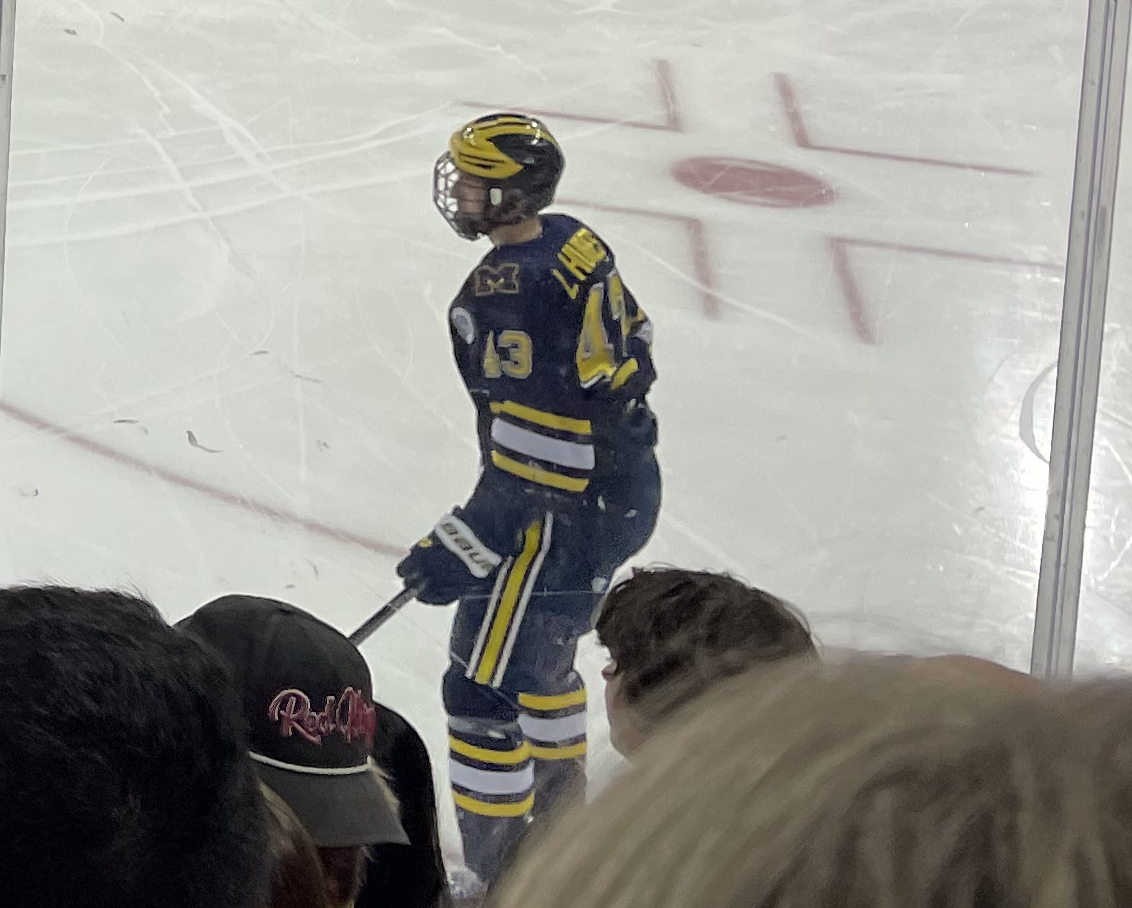
Luke Hughes was selected fourth overall by the New Jersey Devils.

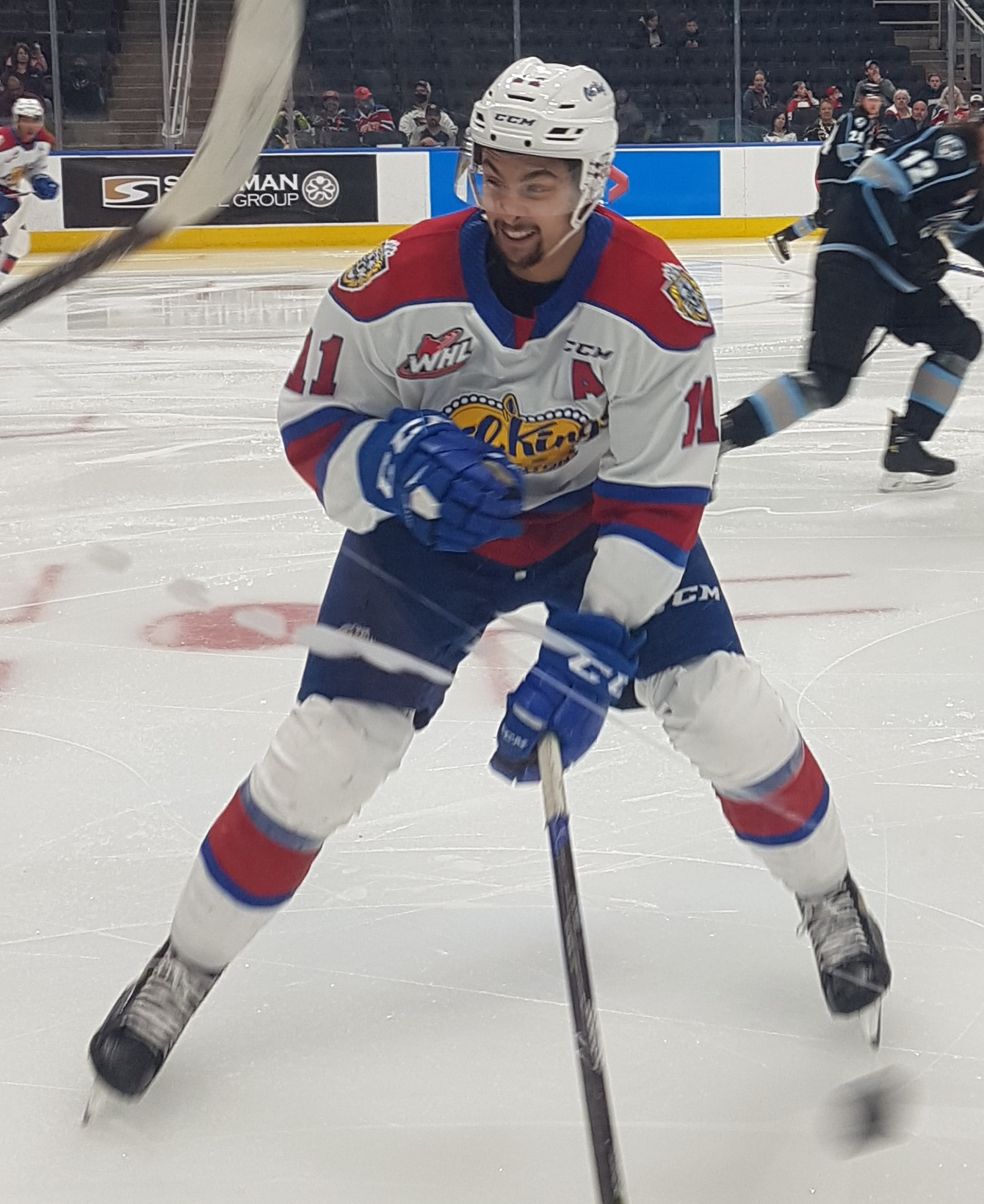
Dylan Guenther was selected ninth overall by the Arizona Coyotes.

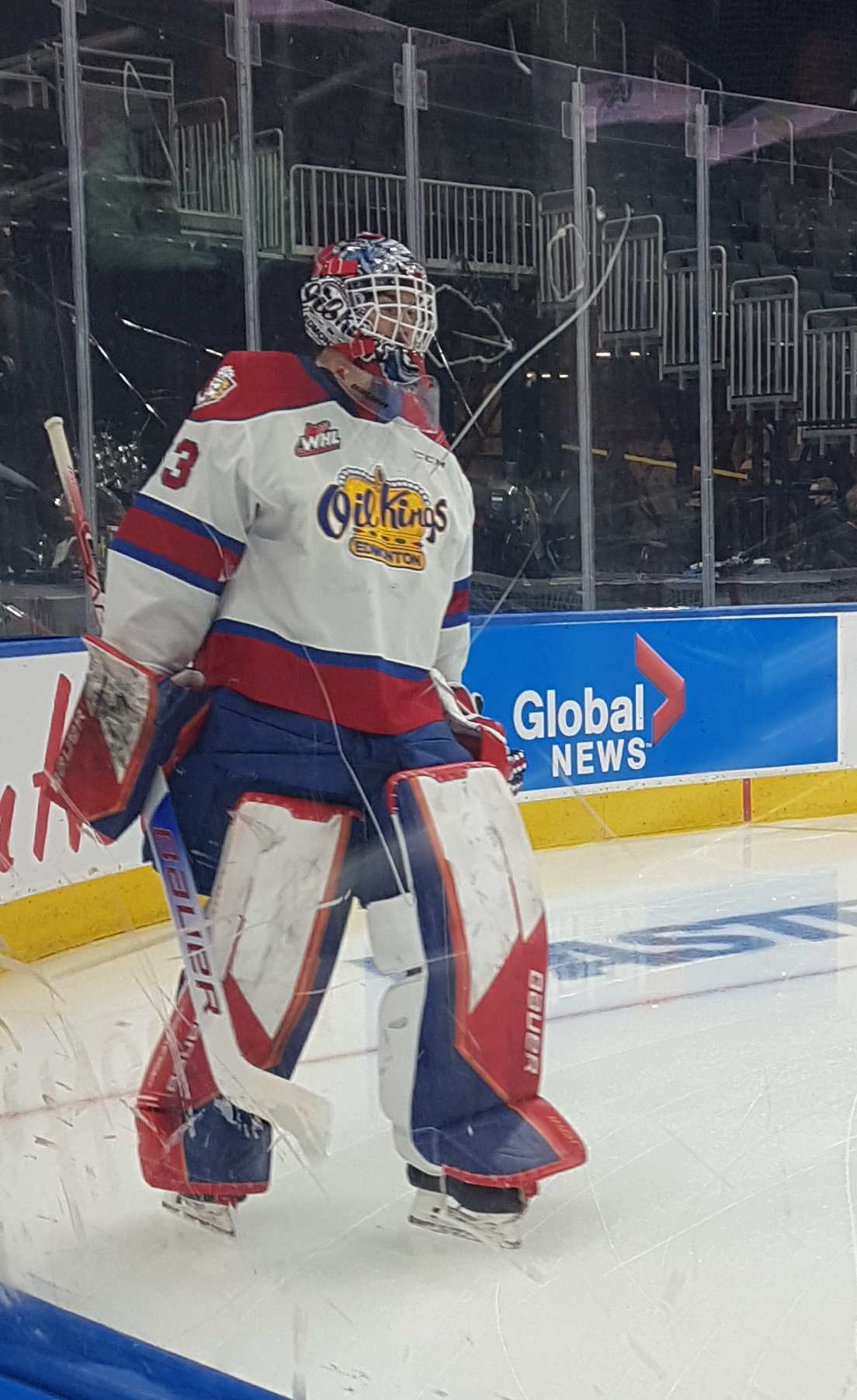
Sebastian Cossa was selected 15th overall by the Detroit Red Wings.

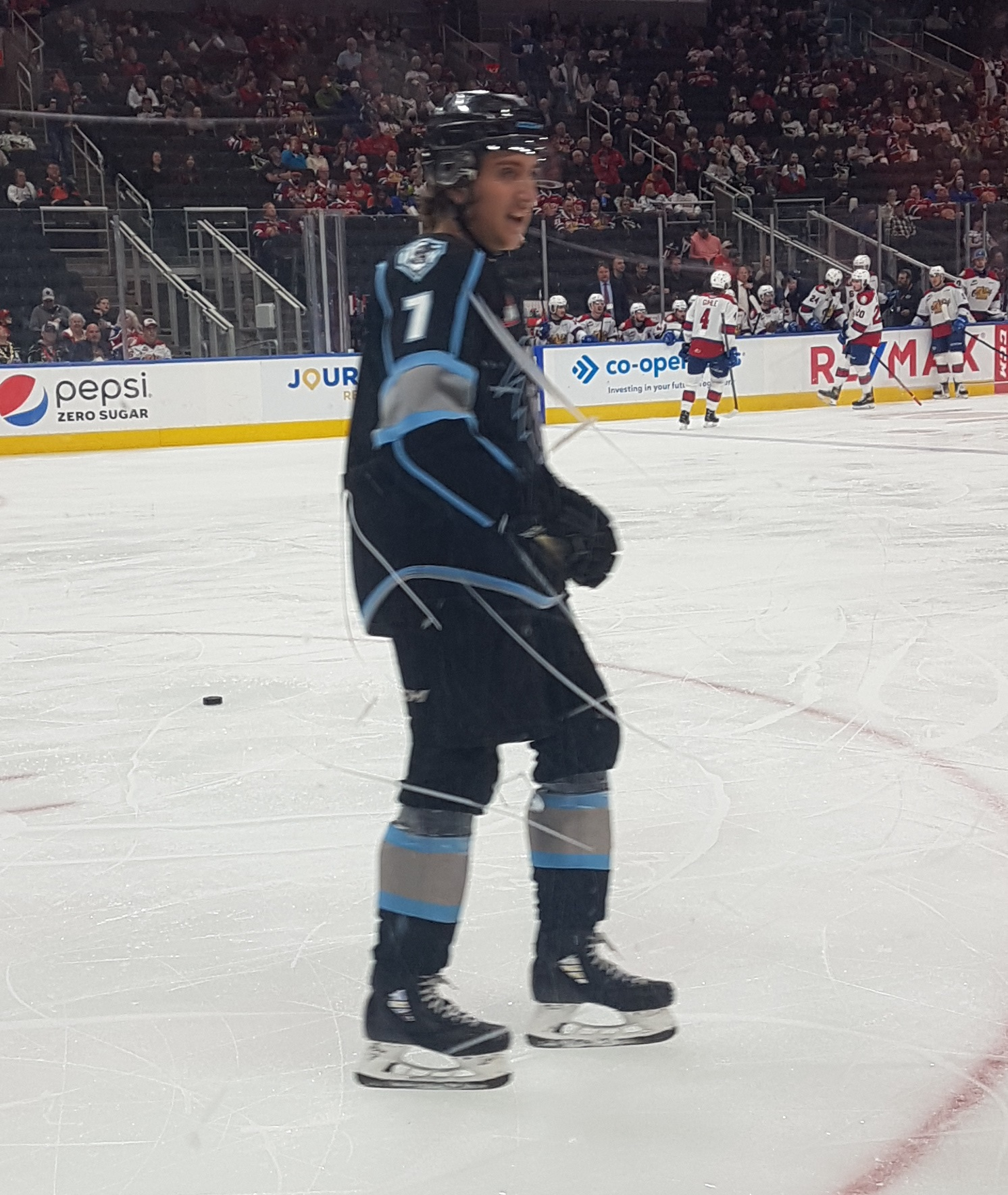
Carson Lambos was selected 26th overall by the Minnesota Wild.

#	Player	Nationality	NHL team	College/junior/club team
1	Owen Power (D)	Canada	Buffalo Sabres	Michigan Wolverines (Big Ten)
2	Matty Beniers (C)	United States	Seattle Kraken	Michigan Wolverines (Big Ten)
3	Mason McTavish (C)	Canada	Anaheim Ducks	EHC Olten (Swiss League)
4	Luke Hughes (D)	United States	New Jersey Devils	U.S. NTDP (USHL)
5	Kent Johnson (C)	Canada	Columbus Blue Jackets	Michigan Wolverines (Big Ten)
6	Simon Edvinsson (D)	Sweden	Detroit Red Wings	Frolunda HC (SHL)
7	William Eklund (LW)	Sweden	San Jose Sharks	Djurgardens IF (SHL)
8	Brandt Clarke (D)	Canada	Los Angeles Kings	Nove Zamky (Slovak Extraliga)
9	Dylan Guenther (RW)	Canada	Arizona Coyotes (from Vancouver)^{1}	Edmonton Oil Kings (WHL)
10	Tyler Boucher (RW)	United States	Ottawa Senators	U.S. NTDP (USHL)
~~11~~	Forfeited pick^{2}		~~Arizona Coyotes~~	
12	Cole Sillinger (C)	Canada	Columbus Blue Jackets (from Chicago)^{3}	Sioux Falls Stampede (USHL)
13	Matthew Coronato (RW)	United States	Calgary Flames	Chicago Steel (USHL)
14	Isak Rosen (RW)	Sweden	Buffalo Sabres (from Philadelphia)^{4}	Leksands IF (SHL)
15	Sebastian Cossa (G)	Canada	Detroit Red Wings (from Dallas)^{5}	Edmonton Oil Kings (WHL)
16	Brennan Othmann (LW)	Canada	New York Rangers	EHC Olten (Swiss League)
17	Zachary Bolduc (C)	Canada	St. Louis Blues	Rimouski Oceanic (QMJHL)
18	Chaz Lucius (C)	United States	Winnipeg Jets	U.S. NTDP (USHL)
19	Fedor Svechkov (C)	Russia	Nashville Predators	HC Lada Togliatti (VHL)
20	Jesper Wallstedt (G)	Sweden	Minnesota Wild (from Edmonton)^{6}	Lulea HF (SHL)
21	Fabian Lysell (RW)	Sweden	Boston Bruins	Lulea HF (SHL)
22	Xavier Bourgault (C)	Canada	Edmonton Oilers (from Minnesota)^{7}	Shawinigan Cataractes (QMJHL)
23	Wyatt Johnston (C)	Canada	Dallas Stars (from Washington via Detroit)^{8}	Windsor Spitfires (OHL)
24	Mackie Samoskevich (RW)	United States	Florida Panthers	Chicago Steel (USHL)
25	Corson Ceulemans (D)	Canada	Columbus Blue Jackets (from Toronto)^{9}	Brooks Bandits (AJHL)
26	Carson Lambos (D)	Canada	Minnesota Wild (from Pittsburgh)^{10}	Winnipeg Ice (WHL)
27	Zachary L'Heureux (LW)	Canada	Nashville Predators (from Carolina)^{11}	Halifax Mooseheads (QMJHL)
28	Oskar Olausson (RW)	Sweden	Colorado Avalanche	HV71 (SHL)
29	Chase Stillman (RW)	Canada	New Jersey Devils (from NY Islanders)^{12}	Esbjerg Energy U20 (Danish U20)
30	Zach Dean (C)	Canada	Vegas Golden Knights	Gatineau Olympiques (QMJHL)
31	Logan Mailloux (D)	Canada	Montreal Canadiens	SK Lejon (Hockeyettan)
32	Nolan Allan (D)	Canada	Chicago Blackhawks (from Tampa Bay via Columbus)^{13}	Prince Albert Raiders (WHL)

Notes

1. The Vancouver Canucks' first-round pick went to the Arizona Coyotes as the result of a trade on July 23, 2021, that sent Oliver Ekman-Larsson and Conor Garland to Vancouver in exchange for Jay Beagle, Loui Eriksson, Antoine Roussel, a second-round pick in 2022, a seventh-round pick in 2023 and this pick.
2. The Arizona Coyotes' first-round pick was forfeited as the result of a penalty sanction due to violations of the NHL Combine Testing Policy during the 2019–20 NHL season. The penalty includes the forfeiture of a second-round pick in 2020 and this pick.
3. The Chicago Blackhawks' first-round pick went to the Columbus Blue Jackets as the result of a trade on July 23, 2021, that sent Seth Jones, Tampa Bay's first-round-pick in 2021 (32nd overall) and a sixth-round pick in 2022 to Chicago in exchange for Adam Boqvist, a second-round pick in 2021 (44th overall), a conditional first-round pick in 2022 and this pick.
4. The Philadelphia Flyers' first-round pick went to the Buffalo Sabres as the result of a trade on July 23, 2021, that sent Rasmus Ristolainen to Philadelphia in exchange for Robert Hagg, a second-round pick in 2023 and this pick.
5. The Dallas Stars first-round pick went to the Detroit Red Wings as the result of a trade on July 23, 2021, that sent Washington's first-round pick, the Rangers' second-round pick and Ottawa's fifth-round pick all in 2021 (23rd, 48th and 138th overall) to Dallas in exchange for this pick.
6. The Edmonton Oilers' first-round pick went to the Minnesota Wild as the result of a trade on July 23, 2021, that sent a first-round pick and Pittsburgh's third-round pick (which Minnesota had previously acquired as the result of a trade on October 5, 2020) both in 2021 (22nd and 90th overall) to Edmonton in exchange for this pick.
7. The Minnesota Wild's first-round pick went to the Edmonton Oilers as the result of a trade on July 23, 2021, that sent a first-round pick in 2021 (20th overall) to Minnesota in exchange for Pittsburgh's third-round pick both in 2021 (90th overall) and this pick.
8. The Washington Capitals' first-round pick went to the Dallas Stars as the result of a trade on July 23, 2021, that sent a first-round pick in 2021 (15th overall) to Detroit in exchange for the Rangers' second-round pick and Ottawa's sixth round pick both in 2021 (48th and 138th overall) and this pick.
  Detroit previously acquired this pick as the result of a trade on April 12, 2021, that sent Anthony Mantha to Washington in exchange for Richard Panik, Jakub Vrana, a second-round pick in 2022 and this pick.
9. The Toronto Maple Leafs' first-round pick went to the Columbus Blue Jackets as the result of a trade on April 11, 2021, that sent Nick Foligno and Stefan Noesen to Toronto in exchange for a fourth-round pick in 2022 and this pick.
10. The Pittsburgh Penguins' first-round pick went to the Minnesota Wild as the result of a trade on February 10, 2020, that sent Jason Zucker to Pittsburgh in exchange for Alex Galchenyuk, Calen Addison and this pick (being conditional at the time of the trade). The condition – Minnesota will receive a 2021 first-round pick at Pittsburgh's choice if the Penguins fail to qualify for the 2020 Eastern Conference First Round – was converted on August 12, 2020, when the Penguins elected to defer the pick to 2021.
11. The Carolina Hurricanes' first-round pick went to the Nashville Predators as the result of a trade on July 23, 2021, that sent Los Angeles and Nashville's second-round picks both in 2021 to Carolina in exchange for this pick.
12. The New York Islanders' first-round pick went to the New Jersey Devils as the result of a trade on April 7, 2021, that sent Kyle Palmieri and Travis Zajac to New York in exchange for A. J. Greer, Mason Jobst, a conditional fourth-round pick in 2022 and this pick.
13. The Tampa Bay Lightning's first-round pick went to the Chicago Blackhawks as the result of a trade on July 23, 2021, that sent a first and second-round pick both in 2021 (12th and 44th overall) to Columbus in exchange for Seth Jones, a sixth-round pick in 2022 and this pick.
  Columbus previously acquired this pick as the result of a trade on April 10, 2021, that sent David Savard to Tampa Bay in exchange for a third-round pick in 2022 and this pick.

=== Round two ===
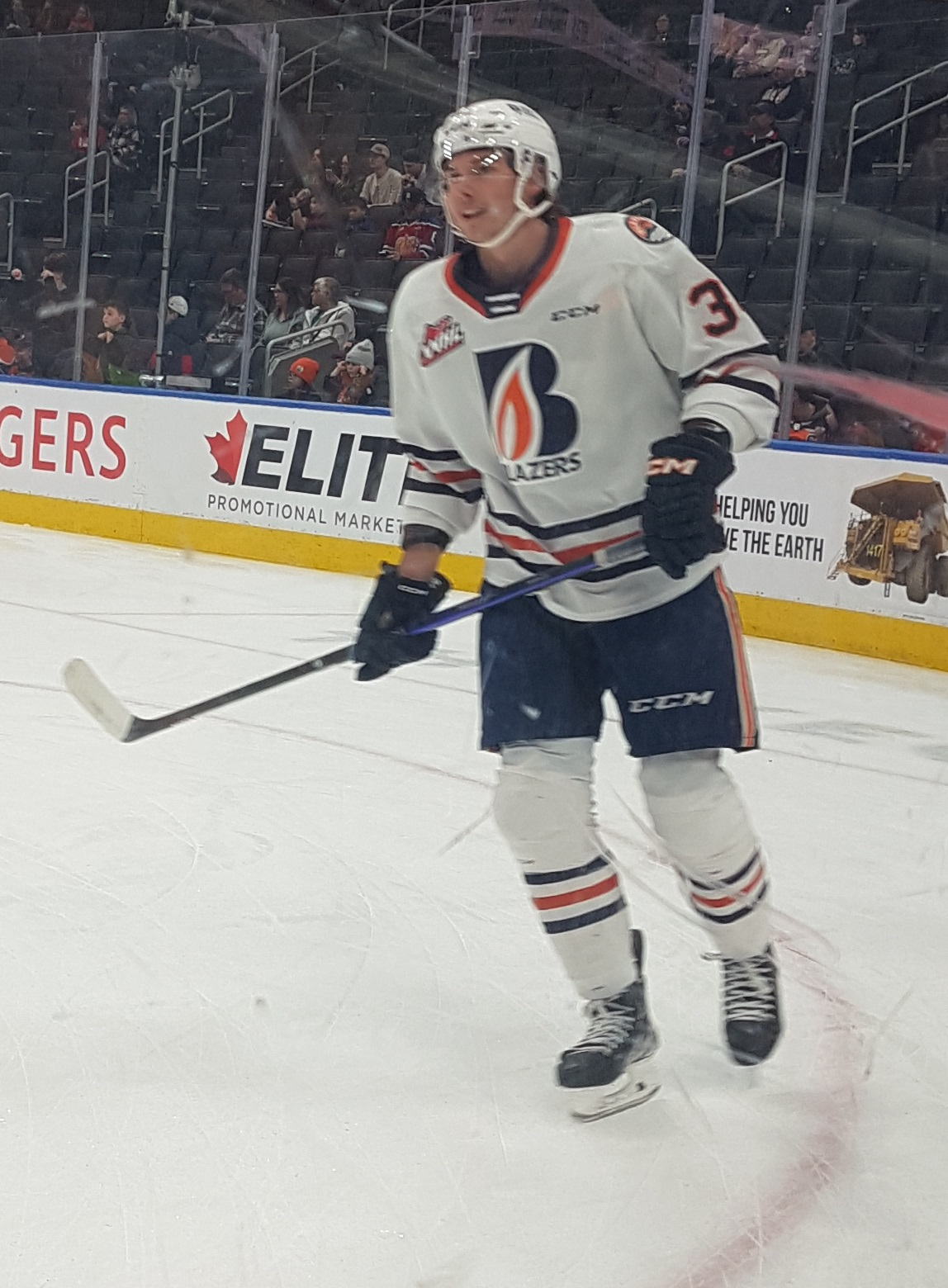
Olen Zellweger was selected 34th overall by the Anaheim Ducks.

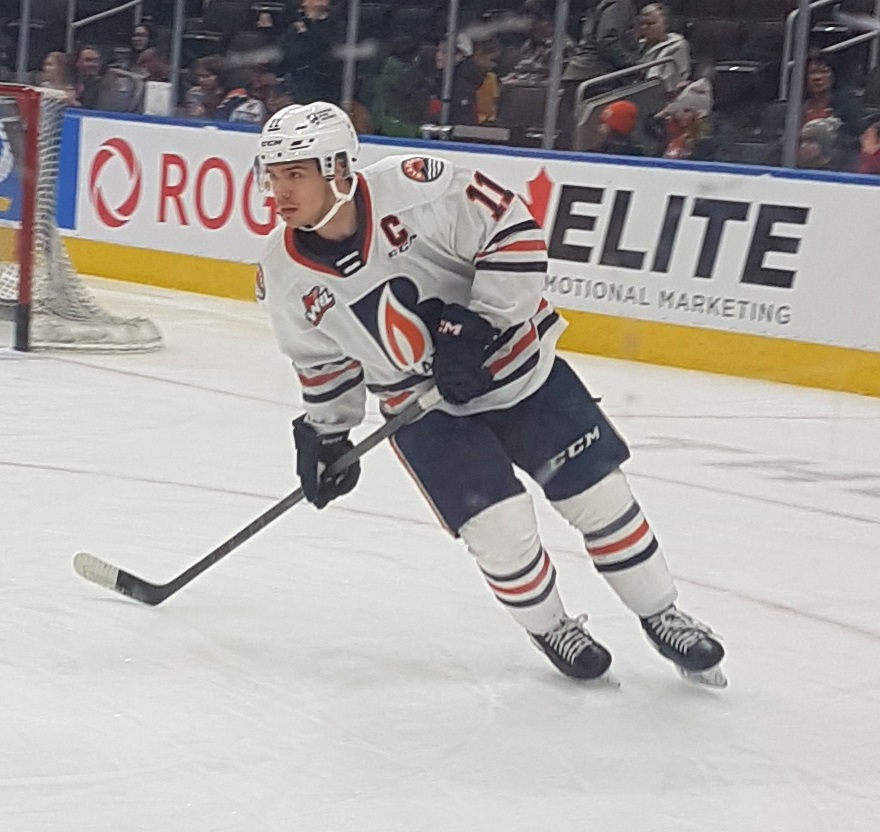
Logan Stankoven was selected 47th overall by the Dallas Stars.

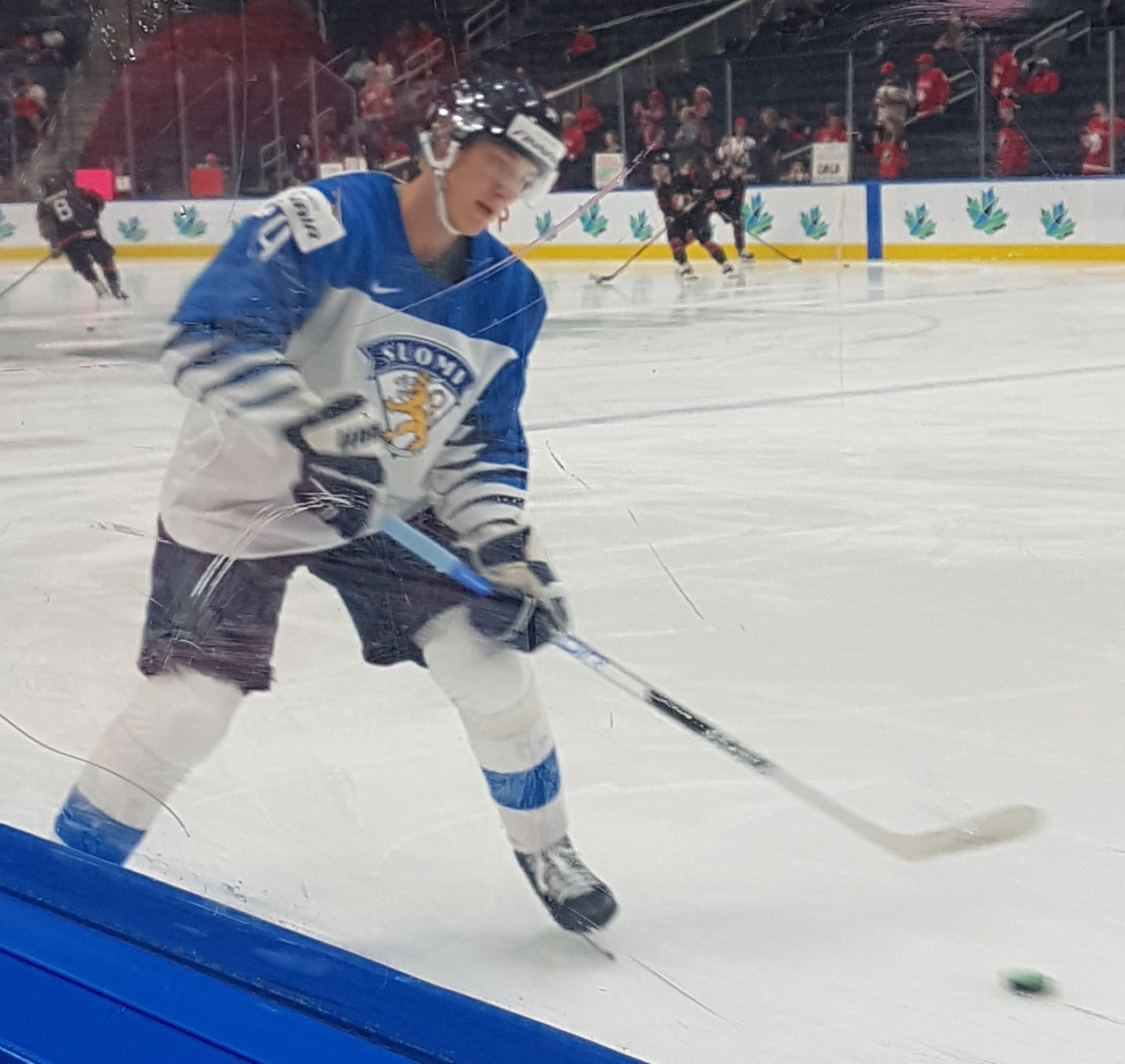
Ville Koivunen was selected 51st overall by the Carolina Hurricanes.

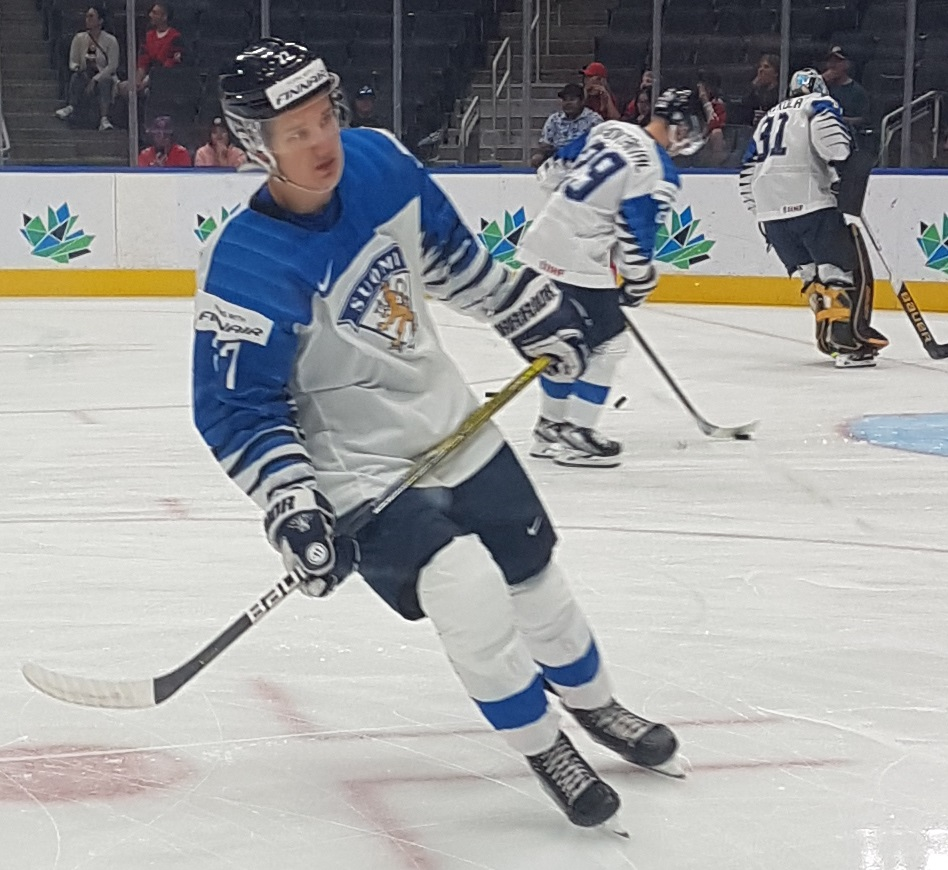
Oliver Kapanen was selected 64th overall by the Montreal Canadiens.

#	Player	Nationality	NHL team	College/junior/club team
33	Prokhor Poltapov (RW)	Russia	Buffalo Sabres	Krasnaya Armiya (MHL)
34	Olen Zellweger (D)	Canada	Anaheim Ducks	Everett Silvertips (WHL)
35	Ryker Evans (D)	Canada	Seattle Kraken	Regina Pats (WHL)
36	Shai Buium (D)	United States	Detroit Red Wings (from New Jersey via Vegas)^{1}	Sioux City Musketeers (USHL)
37	Josh Doan (RW)	United States	Arizona Coyotes (from Columbus via Ottawa)^{2}	Chicago Steel (USHL)
38	Daniil Chayka (D)	Russia	Vegas Golden Knights (from Detroit)^{3}	HC CSKA Moscow (KHL)
39	Zack Ostapchuk (C)	Canada	Ottawa Senators (from San Jose)^{4}	Vancouver Giants (WHL)
40	Scott Morrow (D)	United States	Carolina Hurricanes (from Los Angeles via Nashville)^{5}	Shattuck-Saint Mary's Sabres (USHS-MN)
41	Danila Klimovich (C)	Belarus	Vancouver Canucks	Dinamo Zubry (Vysshaya Liga)
42	Francesco Pinelli (C)	Canada	Los Angeles Kings (from Ottawa)^{6}	HDD Jesenice (AlpsHL)
43	Ilya Fedotov (LW)	Russia	Arizona Coyotes	Torpedo Nizhny Novgorod (KHL)
44	Aleksi Heimosalmi (D)	Finland	Carolina Hurricanes (from Chicago via Columbus)^{7}	Assat (Liiga)
45	William Stromgren (LW)	Sweden	Calgary Flames	Modo (HockeyAllsvenskan)
46	Samu Tuomaala (RW)	Finland	Philadelphia Flyers	Karpat U20 (U20 SM-sarja)
47	Logan Stankoven (C)	Canada	Dallas Stars	Kamloops Blazers (WHL)
48	Artyom Grushnikov (D)	Russia	Dallas Stars (from NY Rangers via Detroit)^{8}	Hamilton Bulldogs (OHL)
49	Benjamin Roger (D)	Canada	Ottawa Senators (from St. Louis via Buffalo, Vegas and Los Angeles)^{9}	London Knights (OHL)
50	Nikita Chibrikov (RW)	Russia	Winnipeg Jets	SKA Saint Petersburg (KHL)
51	Ville Koivunen (RW)	Finland	Carolina Hurricanes (from Nashville)^{10}	Karpat U20 (U20 SM-sarja)
52	Aatu Raty (C)	Finland	New York Islanders (from Edmonton via Detroit)^{11}	Oulun Karpat (Liiga)
53	Aleksandr Kisakov (LW)	Russia	Buffalo Sabres (from Boston)^{12}	MHC Dynamo Moscow (MHL)
54	Jack Peart (D)	United States	Minnesota Wild	Grand Rapids Thunderhawks (USHS-MN)
55	Vincent Iorio (D)	Canada	Washington Capitals	Brandon Wheat Kings (WHL)
56	Evan Nause (D)	Canada	Florida Panthers	Quebec Remparts (QMJHL)
57	Matthew Knies (LW)	United States	Toronto Maple Leafs	Tri-City Storm (USHL)
58	Tristan Broz (C)	United States	Pittsburgh Penguins	Fargo Force (USHL)
59	Samuel Helenius (C)	Finland	Los Angeles Kings (from Carolina)^{13}	JYP (Liiga)
60	J.J. Moser (D)	Switzerland	Arizona Coyotes (from Colorado via NY Islanders)^{14}	EHC Biel (NL)
61	Sean Behrens (D)	United States	Colorado Avalanche (from NY Islanders via New Jersey)^{15}	U.S. NTDP (USHL)
62	Colton Dach (C)	Canada	Chicago Blackhawks (from Vegas)^{16}	Saskatoon Blades (WHL)
63	Riley Kidney (C)	Canada	Montreal Canadiens	Acadie–Bathurst Titan (QMJHL)
64	Oliver Kapanen (C)	Finland	Montreal Canadiens (from Tampa Bay)^{17}	KalPa U20 (U20 SM-sarja)

Notes

1. The New Jersey Devils' second-round pick went to the Detroit Red Wings as the result of a trade on July 24, 2021, that sent a second-round pick and Tampa Bay's fourth-round pick both in 2021 (38th and 128th overall) to Vegas in exchange for this pick.
  Vegas previously acquired this pick as the result of a trade on July 29, 2019, that sent Nikita Gusev to New Jersey in exchange for a third-round pick in 2020 and this pick.
2. The Columbus Blue Jackets' second-round pick went to the Arizona Coyotes as the result of a trade on December 26, 2020, that sent Derek Stepan to Ottawa in exchange for this pick.
  Ottawa previously acquired this pick as the result of a trade on February 23, 2019, that sent Ryan Dzingel and Calgary's seventh-round pick in 2019 to Columbus in exchange for Anthony Duclair, a second-round pick in 2020, and this pick.
3. The Detroit Red Wings' second-round pick went to the Vegas Golden Knights as the result of a trade on July 24, 2021, that sent New Jersey's second-round pick in 2021 (36th overall) to Detroit in exchange for Tampa Bay's fourth-round pick in 2021 (128th overall) and this pick.
4. The San Jose Sharks' second-round pick went to the Ottawa Senators as the result of a trade on September 13, 2018, that sent Erik Karlsson and Francis Perron to San Jose in exchange for Chris Tierney, Dylan DeMelo, Josh Norris, Rudolfs Balcers, a conditional second-round pick in 2019, a conditional l first-round pick in 2019 or 2020, a conditional first-round pick no later than 2022, and this pick (being conditional at the time of the trade). The condition – Ottawa will receive a second-round pick in 2021 if Karlsson re-signs with the Sharks for the 2019–20 NHL season and the Sharks do not make the 2019 Stanley Cup Finals – was converted on June 17, 2019, when Karlsson re-signed with San Jose for the 2019–20 NHL season.
5. The Los Angeles Kings' second-round pick went to the Carolina Hurricanes as the result of a trade on July 23, 2021, that sent Carolina's first-round pick (27th overall) in 2021 to Nashville in exchange for a second-round pick (51st overall) and this pick.
  Nashville previously acquired this pick as the result of a trade on July 1, 2021, that sent Viktor Arvidsson to Los Angeles in exchange for a third-round pick in 2022 and this pick.
6. The Ottawa Senators' second-round pick went to the Los Angeles Kings as the result of a trade on July 24, 2021, that sent St. Louis' second-round pick and a fifth-round pick both in 2021 (49th and 136th overall) to Ottawa in exchange for this pick.
7. The Chicago Blackhawks' second-round pick went to the Carolina Hurricanes as the result of a trade on July 23, 2021, that sent Jake Bean to Columbus in exchange for this pick.
  Columbus previously acquired this pick as the result of a trade on July 23, 2021, that sent Seth Jones, Tampa Bay's first-round-pick in 2021 (32nd overall) and a sixth-round pick in 2022 to Chicago in exchange for Adam Boqvist, a first-round pick in 2021 (12th overall), a conditional first-round pick in 2022 and this pick.
8. The New York Rangers' second-round pick went to the Dallas Stars as the result of a trade on July 23, 2021, that sent a first-round pick in 2021 (15th overall) to Detroit in exchange for Washington's first-round pick and Ottawa's fifth-round pick both in 2021 (23rd and 138th overall) and this pick.
  Detroit previously acquired this pick as the result of a trade on September 26, 2020, that sent future considerations to New York in exchange for Marc Staal and this pick.
9. The St. Louis Blues' second-round pick went to the Ottawa Senators as the result of a trade on July 24, 2021, that sent a second-round pick in 2021 (42nd overall) to Los Angeles in exchange for a fifth-round pick in 2021 (136th overall) and this pick.
  Los Angeles previously acquired this as the result of a trade on February 19, 2020, that sent Alec Martinez to Vegas in exchange for a second-round pick in 2020 and this pick.
  Vegas previously acquired this pick as the result of a trade on June 28, 2019, that sent Colin Miller to Buffalo in exchange for a fifth-round pick in 2022 and this pick.
  Buffalo previously acquired this pick as the result of a trade on July 1, 2018, that sent Ryan O'Reilly to St. Louis in exchange for Vladimir Sobotka, Patrik Berglund, Tage Thompson, a conditional first-round pick in 2019 or 2020 and this pick.
10. The Nashville Predators' second-round pick went to the Carolina Hurricanes as the result of a trade on July 23, 2021, that sent Carolina's first-round pick (27th overall) in 2021 to Nashville in exchange for Los Angeles' second-round pick (40th overall) and this pick.
11. The Edmonton Oilers' second-round pick went to the New York Islanders as the result of a trade on July 16, 2021, that sent Nick Leddy to Detroit in exchange for Richard Panik and this pick.
  Detroit previously acquired this pick as the result of a trade on February 24, 2020, that sent Andreas Athanasiou and Ryan Kuffner to Edmonton in exchange for Sam Gagner, a second-round pick in 2020 and this pick.
12. The Boston Bruins' second-round pick went to the Buffalo Sabres as the result of a trade on April 12, 2021, that sent Taylor Hall and Curtis Lazar to Boston in exchange for Anders Bjork and this pick.
13. The Carolina Hurricanes' second-round pick went to the Los Angeles Kings as the result of a trade on July 24, 2021, that sent a third-round pick and Calgary's fourth-round pick both in 2021 (72nd and 109th overall) to Carolina in exchange for this pick.
14. The Colorado Avalanche's second-round pick went to the Arizona Coyotes as the result of a trade on July 17, 2021, that sent future considerations to the New York Islanders in exchange for Andrew Ladd, a conditional second-round pick in 2022, a conditional third-round pick in 2023, and this pick.
  The Islanders previously acquired this pick as the result of a trade on October 12, 2020, that sent Devon Toews to Colorado in exchange for a second-round pick in 2022 and this pick.
15. The New York Islanders' second-round pick went to the Colorado Avalanche as the result of a trade on July 15, 2021, that sent Ryan Graves to New Jersey in exchange for Mikhail Maltsev and this pick.
  New Jersey previously acquired this pick as the result of a trade on February 16, 2020, that sent Andy Greene to New York in exchange for David Quenneville and this pick.
16. The Vegas Golden Knights' second-round pick went to the Chicago Blackhawks as the result of a trade on April 12, 2021, that sent Nick DeSimone and a fifth-round pick in 2022 to Vegas in exchange for a third-round pick in 2022 and this pick.
17. The Tampa Bay Lightning's second-round pick went to the Montreal Canadiens as the result of a trade on October 7, 2020, that sent St. Louis' second-round pick in 2020 (57th overall) to Tampa Bay in exchange for a fourth-round pick in 2020 (124th overall) and this pick.

=== Round three ===
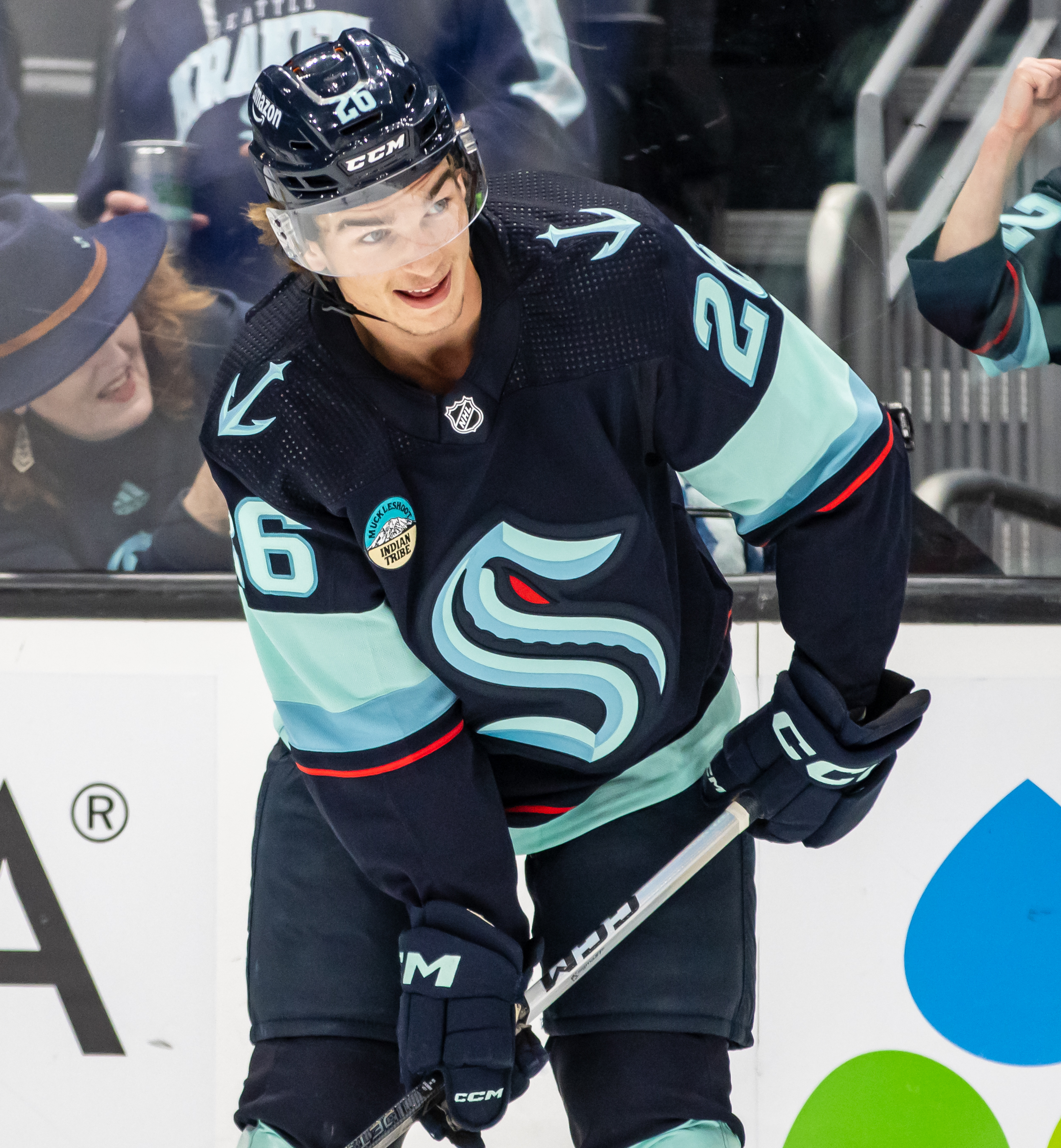
Ryan Winterton was selected 67th overall by the Seattle Kraken.

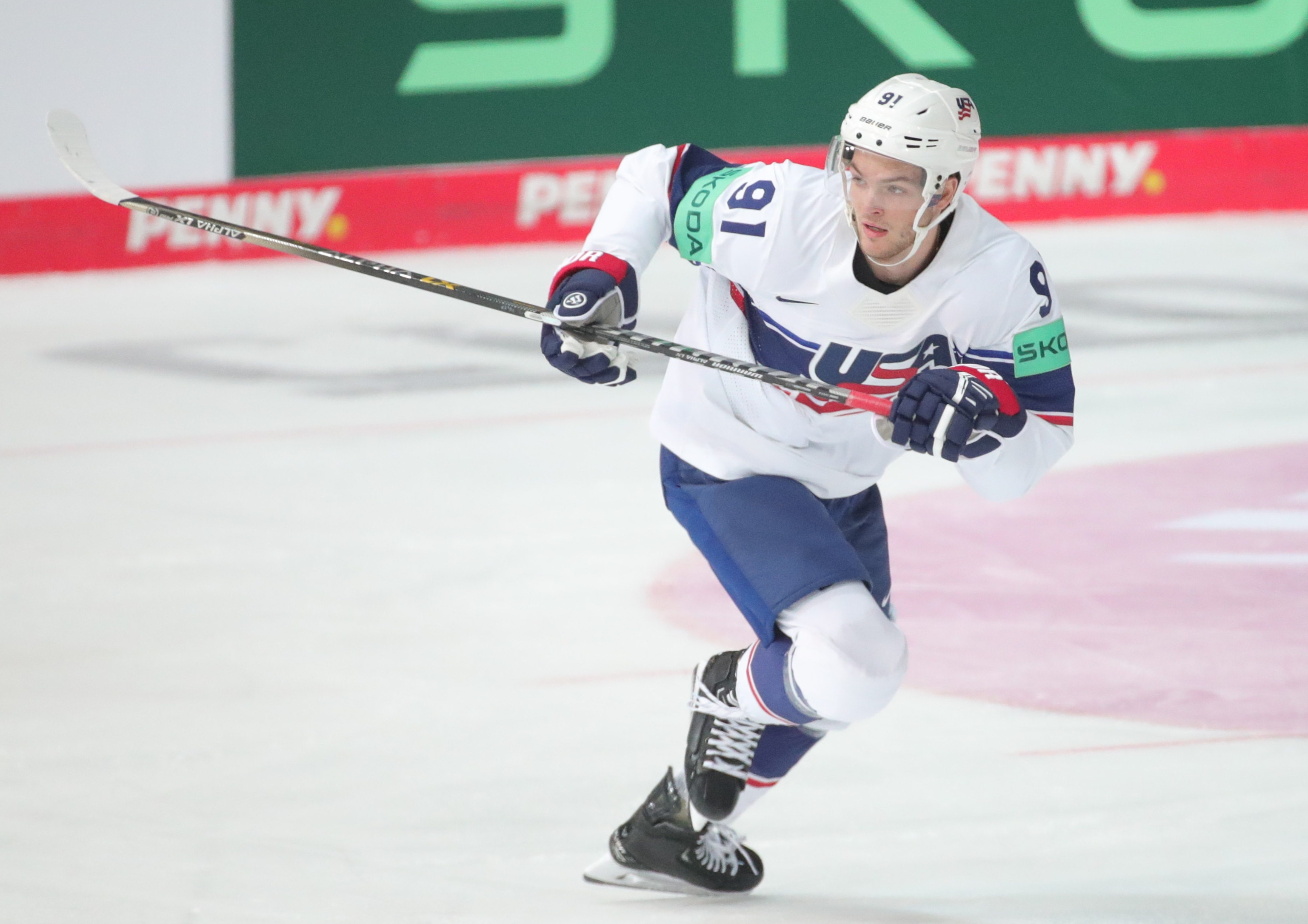
Carter Mazur was selected 70th overall by the Detroit Red Wings.

Brent Johnson was selected 80th overal by the San Jose Sharks.

#	Player	Nationality	NHL team	College/junior/club team
65	Jayden Grubbe (C)	Canada	New York Rangers (from Buffalo)^{1}	Red Deer Rebels (WHL)
66	Sasha Pastujov (RW)	United States	Anaheim Ducks	U.S. NTDP (USHL)
67	Ryan Winterton (C)	Canada	Seattle Kraken	Hamilton Bulldogs (OHL)
68	Samu Salminen (C)	Finland	New Jersey Devils	Jokerit U20 (U20 SM-sarja)
69	Stanislav Svozil (D)	Czech Republic	Columbus Blue Jackets	HC Kometa Brno (ELH)
70	Carter Mazur (LW)	United States	Detroit Red Wings	Tri-City Storm (USHL)
71	Simon Robertsson (RW)	Sweden	St. Louis Blues (from San Jose)^{2}	Skelleftea AIK (SHL)
72	Anton Olsson (D)	Sweden	Nashville Predators (from Los Angeles via Carolina)^{3}	Malmo Redhawks (SHL)
73	Ayrton Martino (LW)	Canada	Dallas Stars (from Vancouver)^{4}	Omaha Lancers (USHL)
74	Oliver Johansson (LW)	Sweden	Ottawa Senators	Timra IK (HockeyAllsvenskan)
75	Ryder Korczak (C)	Canada	New York Rangers (from Arizona via New Jersey and Washington)^{5}	Moose Jaw Warriors (WHL)
76	Tyson Hinds (D)	Canada	Anaheim Ducks (from Chicago via Montreal)^{6}	Rimouski Oceanic (QMJHL)
77	Cole Huckins (C)	Canada	Calgary Flames	Acadie–Bathurst Titan (QMJHL)
78	Aleksei Kolosov (G)	Belarus	Philadelphia Flyers	HC Dinamo Minsk (KHL)
79	Justin Ertel (LW)	Canada	Dallas Stars	Summerside Western Capitals (MJHL)
80	Brent Johnson (D)	United States	Washington Capitals (from NY Rangers)^{7}	Sioux Falls Stampede (USHL)
81	Benjamin Gaudreau (G)	Canada	San Jose Sharks (from St. Louis)^{8}	Sarnia Sting (OHL)
82	Dmitri Kuzmin (D)	Belarus	Winnipeg Jets	HC Dinamo-Molodechno (BHL)
83	Patrik Hamrla (G)	Czech Republic	Carolina Hurricanes (from Nashville)^{9}	HC Energie Karlovy Vary (Extraliga)
84	Kirill Kirsanov (D)	Russia	Los Angeles Kings (from Edmonton via Calgary)^{10}	SKA Saint Petersburg (KHL)
85	Brett Harrison (C)	Canada	Boston Bruins	Koovee (Mestis)
86	Caedan Bankier (C)	Canada	Minnesota Wild	Kamloops Blazers (WHL)
87	Dmitri Kostenko (D)	Russia	Montreal Canadiens (from Washington via San Jose)^{11}	Lada Togliatti (VHL)
88	Stiven Sardarian (RW)	Russia	Buffalo Sabres (from Florida)^{12}	Krasnaya Armiya (MHL)
89	Cameron Whynot (D)	Canada	Calgary Flames (from Toronto via Los Angeles)^{13}	Halifax Mooseheads (QMJHL)
90	Luca Munzenberger (D)	Germany	Edmonton Oilers (from Pittsburgh via San Jose and Minnesota)^{14}	Kolner Junghaie U20 (DNL)
91	Taige Harding (D)	Canada	Chicago Blackhawks (from Carolina)^{15}	Fort McMurray Oil Barons (AJHL)
92	Andrei Buyalsky (C)	Kazakhstan	Colorado Avalanche	Dubuque Fighting Saints (USHL)
93	Tristan Lennox (G)	Canada	New York Islanders	Saginaw Spirit (OHL)
94	Aidan Hreschuk (D)	United States	Carolina Hurricanes (from Vegas via Detroit)^{16}	U.S. NTDP (USDP)
95	Joshua Bloom (LW)	Canada	Buffalo Sabres (from Montreal)^{17}	Saginaw Spirit (OHL)
96	Roman Schmidt (D)	United States	Tampa Bay Lightning	U.S. NTDP (USDP)

Notes

1. The Buffalo Sabres' third-round pick went to the New York Rangers as the result of a trade on July 1, 2019, that sent Jimmy Vesey to Buffalo in exchange for this pick.
2. The San Jose Sharks' third-round pick went to the St. Louis Blues as the result of a trade on July 24, 2021, that sent a third and sixth-round pick both in 2021 (81st and 177th overall) to San Jose in exchange for this pick.
3. The Los Angeles Kings' third-round pick went to the Nashville Predators as the result of a trade on July 24, 2021, that sent a third and fifth-round pick both in 2021 (83rd and 147th overall) to Carolina in exchange for this pick.
  Carolina previously acquired this pick as the result of a trade on July 24, 2021, that sent a second-round pick in 2021 (59th overall) to Los Angeles in exchange for Calgary's fourth-round pick in 2021 (109th overall) and this pick.
4. The Vancouver Canucks' third-round pick went to the Dallas Stars as the result of a trade on July 17, 2021, that sent Jason Dickinson to Vancouver in exchange for this pick.
5. The Arizona Coyotes' third-round pick went to the New York Rangers as the result of a trade on July 24, 2021, that sent a third and sixth-round pick both in 2021 (80th and 176th overall) to Washington in exchange for this pick.
  Washington previously acquired this pick as the result of a trade on April 11, 2021, that sent a Jonas Siegenthaler to New Jersey in exchange for this conditional pick. The condition – Washington will receive Arizona's third-round pick in 2021 at New Jersey's choice, if the pick is available before the time of the selection – the date of conversion is unknown.
  New Jersey previously acquired this pick as the result of a trade on December 16, 2019, that sent Taylor Hall and Blake Speers to Arizona in exchange for Nick Merkley, Kevin Bahl, Nate Schnarr, a conditional first-round pick in 2020 and this pick (being conditional at the time of the trade). The condition – New Jersey will receive a third-round pick in 2021 if Arizona does not advance to the 2020 Western Conference Second Round and Hall does not re-sign with Arizona for the 2020–21 NHL season – was converted when Arizona was eliminated in the First Round of the playoffs on August 19, 2020, and when Hall signed with the Buffalo Sabres on October 11, 2020.
6. The Chicago Blackhawks' third-round pick went to the Anaheim Ducks as the result of a trade on July 24, 2021, that sent a third-round pick in 2022 to Montreal in exchange for this pick.
  Montreal previously acquired this pick as the result of a trade on June 30, 2019, that sent Andrew Shaw and a seventh-round pick in 2021 to Chicago in exchange for second and seventh-round picks both in 2020 and this pick.
7. The New York Rangers' third-round pick went to the Washington Capitals as the result of a trade on July 24, 2021, that sent Arizona's third-round pick in 2021 (75th overall) to New York in exchange for a sixth-round pick in 2021 (176th overall) and this pick.
8. The St. Louis Blues' third-round pick went to the San Jose Sharks as the result of a trade on July 24, 2021, that sent a third-round pick in 2021 (71st overall) to St. Louis in exchange for a sixth-round pick in 2021 (177th overall) and this pick.
9. The Nashville Predators' third-round pick went to the Carolina Hurricanes as the result of a trade on July 24, 2021, that sent Los Angeles' third-round pick in 2021 (72nd overall) to Nashville in exchange for a fifth-round pick in 2021 (147th overall) and this pick.
10. The Edmonton Oilers' third-round pick went to the Los Angeles Kings as the result of a trade on July 24, 2021, that sent Toronto's third-round pick and a sixth-round pick both in 2021 (89th and 168th overall) to Calgary in exchange for this pick.
  Calgary previously acquired this pick as the result of a trade on July 19, 2019, that sent James Neal to Edmonton in exchange for Milan Lucic and this pick (being conditional at the time of the trade). The condition – Calgary will receive a third-round pick in 2020 or 2021 at Edmonton's choice, after the league made a ruling on this conditional pick on July 31, 2020. The original condition on this pick was that Calgary will receive a 2020 third-round pick if Neal scores at least 21 goals during the 2019–20 NHL season and Lucic has at least ten fewer goals than Neal – was converted when the Oilers elected to keep their 2020 third-round pick on October 7, 2020.
11. The Washington Capitals' third-round pick went to the Montreal Canadiens as the result of a trade on October 7, 2020, that sent Anaheim's fourth-round pick in 2020 (98th overall) to San Jose in exchange for this pick.
  San Jose previously acquired this pick as the result of a trade on February 18, 2020, that sent Brenden Dillon to Washington in exchange for Colorado's second-round pick in 2020 and this pick (being conditional at the time of the trade). The condition – San Jose will receive a third-round pick in 2021 if Washington does not win the Stanley Cup in 2020 – was converted when Washington was eliminated from the 2020 Stanley Cup playoffs on August 20, 2020.
12. The Florida Panthers' third-round pick went to the Buffalo Sabres as the result of a trade on April 10, 2021, that sent Brandon Montour to Florida in exchange for this pick.
13. The Toronto Maple Leafs' third-round pick went to the Calgary Flames as the result of a trade on July 24, 2021, that sent Edmonton's third-round pick in 2021 (84th overall) to Los Angeles in exchange for a sixth-round pick in 2021 (168th overall) and this pick.
  Los Angeles previously acquired this pick as the result of a trade on February 5, 2020, that sent Jack Campbell and Kyle Clifford to Toronto in exchange for Trevor Moore, Columbus' third-round pick in 2020 and this pick (being conditional at the time of the trade). The condition – Los Angeles will receive a third-round pick in 2021 if Clifford does not re-sign with Toronto for the 2020–21 NHL season – was converted when Clifford signed with St. Louis.
14. The Pittsburgh Penguins' third-round pick went to the Edmonton Oilers as the result of a trade on July 23, 2021, that sent a first-round pick in 2021 (20th overall) to Minnesota in exchange for a first-round pick in 2021 (22nd overall) and this pick.
  Minnesota previously acquired this pick as the result of a trade on October 5, 2020, that sent Ryan Donato to San Jose in exchange for this pick.
  San Jose previously acquired this pick as the result of a trade on February 24, 2020, that sent Patrick Marleau to Pittsburgh in exchange for this pick (being conditional at the time of the trade). The condition – San Jose will receive a third-round pick in 2021 if Pittsburgh does not win the Stanley Cup in 2020 – was converted when the Penguins were eliminated from the 2020 Stanley Cup playoffs on August 7, 2020.
15. The Carolina Hurricanes' third-round pick went to the Chicago Blackhawks as the result of a trade on July 24, 2021, that sent a third-round pick in 2022 to Carolina in exchange for this pick.
16. The Vegas Golden Knights third-round pick went to the Carolina Hurricanes as the result of a trade on July 22, 2021, that sent Alex Nedeljkovic to Detroit in exchange for Jonathan Bernier and this pick.
  Detroit previously acquired this pick as the result of a trade on February 26, 2018, that sent Tomas Tatar to Vegas in exchange for a first-round pick in 2018, the Islanders' second-round pick in 2019 and this pick.
17. The Montreal Canadiens' third-round pick went to the Buffalo Sabres as the result of a trade on March 26, 2021, that sent Eric Staal to Montreal in exchange for a fifth-round pick in 2021 and this pick.

=== Round four ===
Brody Lamb was selected 104th overall by the New York Rangers.

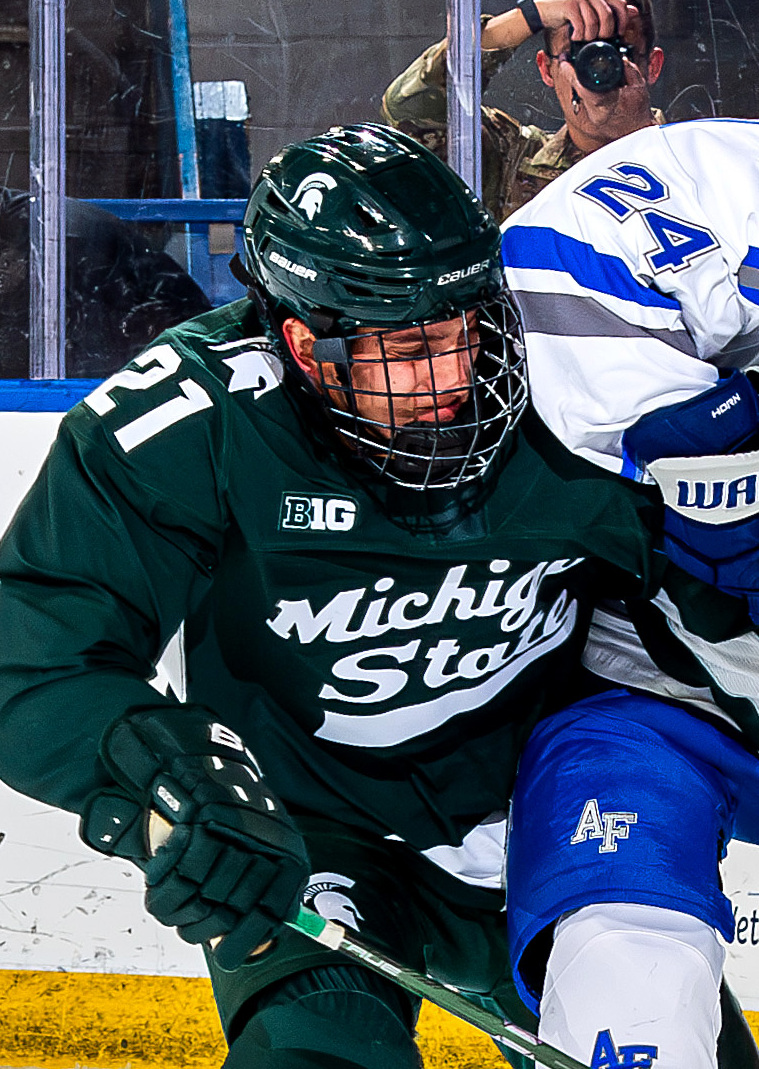
Red Savage was selected 114th overall by the Detroit Red Wings.

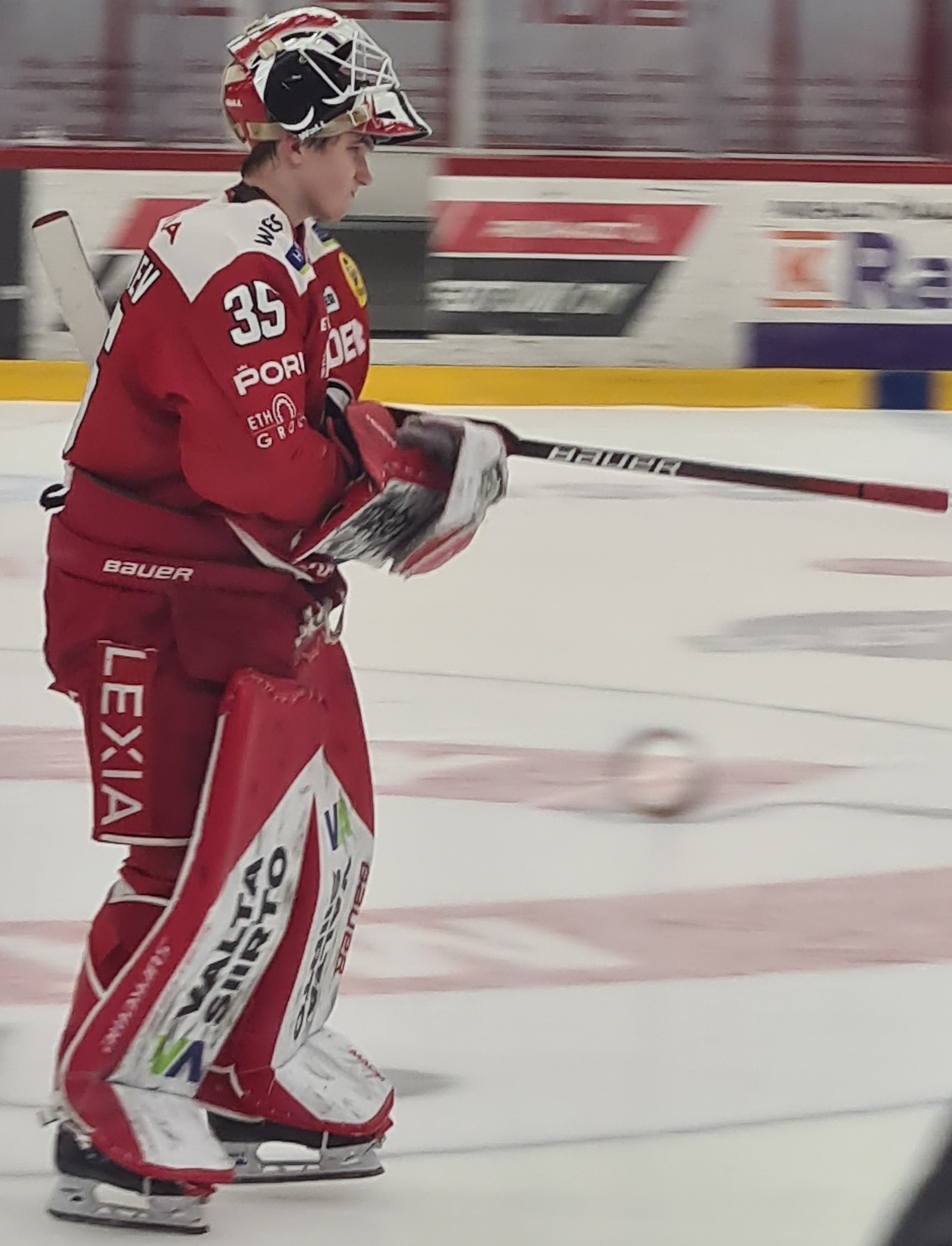
Rasmus Korhonen was selected 122nd overall by the Arizona Coyotes.

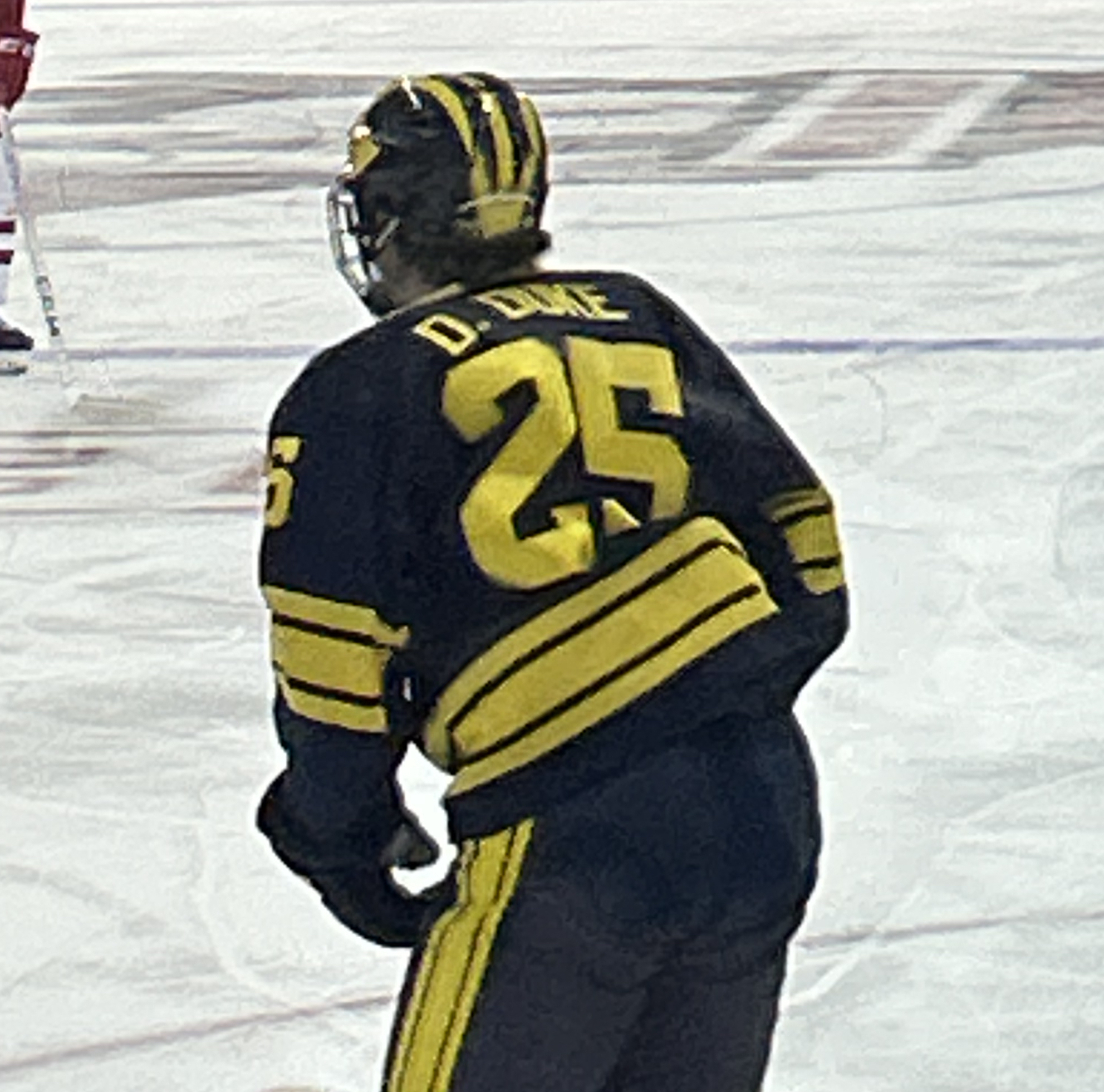
Dylan Duke was selected 126th overall by the Tampa Bay Lightning.

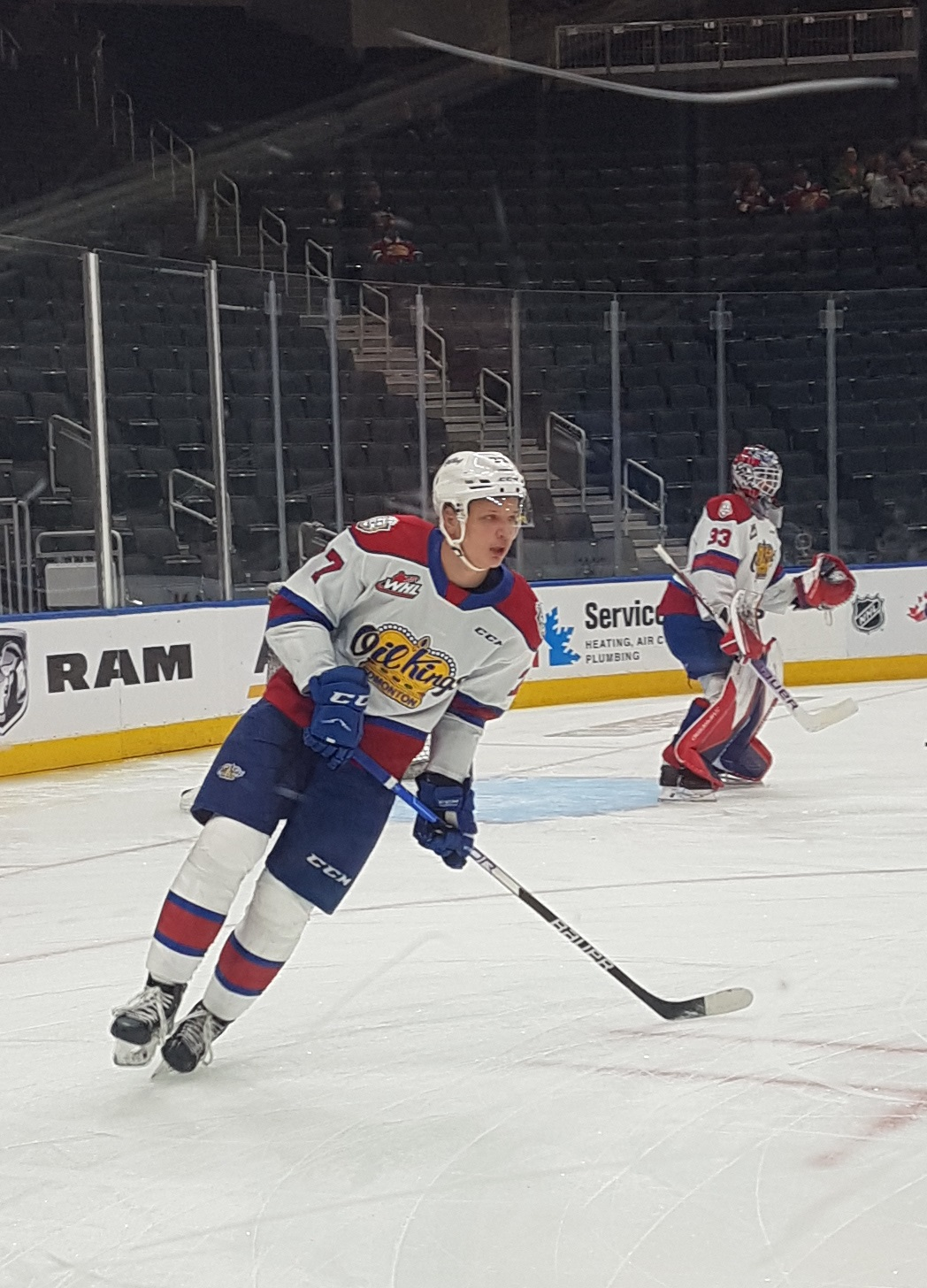
Jakub Demek was selected 128th overall by the Vegas Golden Knights.

#	Player	Nationality	NHL team	College/junior/club team
97	Olivier Nadeau (RW)	Canada	Buffalo Sabres	Shawinigan Cataractes (QMJHL)
98	Joshua Lopina (C)	United States	Anaheim Ducks	UMass Minutemen (Hockey East)
99	Ville Ottavainen (D)	Finland	Seattle Kraken	JYP (Liiga)
100	Jakub Malek (G)	Czech Republic	New Jersey Devils	VHK Vsetin (Czech 1.liga)
101	Guillaume Richard (D)	Canada	Columbus Blue Jackets	Tri-City Storm (USHL)
102	Jakub Brabenec (C)	Czech Republic	Vegas Golden Knights (from Detroit)^{1}	HC Kometa Brno (Czech Extraliga)
103	Gannon Laroque (D)	Canada	San Jose Sharks	Victoria Royals (WHL)
104	Brody Lamb (RW)	United States	New York Rangers (from Los Angeles)^{2}	Dodge County Wildcats (USHS-MN)
105	Ethan Del Mastro (D)	Canada	Chicago Blackhawks (from Vancouver)^{3}	Mississauga Steelheads (OHL)
106	Kalle Vaisanen (LW)	Finland	New York Rangers (from Ottawa)^{4}	TPS U20 (U20 SM-sarja)
107	Emil Lilleberg (D)	Norway	Arizona Coyotes	Sparta Sarpsborg (Eliteserien)
108	Victor Stjernborg (C)	Sweden	Chicago Blackhawks	Vaxjo Lakers (SHL)
109	Jackson Blake (RW)	United States	Carolina Hurricanes (from Calgary via Los Angeles)^{5}	Chicago Steel (USHL)
110	Brian Zanetti (D)	Switzerland	Philadelphia Flyers	HC Lugano U20 (U20-Elit)
111	Conner Roulette (LW)	Canada	Dallas Stars	Seattle Thunderbirds (WHL)
112	Talyn Boyko (G)	Canada	New York Rangers	Tri-City Americans (WHL)
113	William Trudeau (D)	Canada	Montreal Canadiens (from St. Louis)^{6}	Charlottetown Islanders (QMJHL)
114	Red Savage (C)	United States	Detroit Red Wings (from Winnipeg via Vegas)^{7}	U.S. NTDP (USHL)
115	Ryan Ufko (D)	United States	Nashville Predators	Chicago Steel (USHL)
116	Jake Chiasson (C)	Canada	Edmonton Oilers	Brandon Wheat Kings (WHL)
117	Philip Svedeback (G)	Sweden	Boston Bruins	Vaxjo Lakers U20 (J20 SuperElit)
118	Kyle Masters (D)	Canada	Minnesota Wild	Red Deer Rebels (WHL)
119	Joaquim Lemay (D)	Canada	Washington Capitals	Salmon Arm Silverbacks (BCHL)
120	Vladislav Lukashevich (D)	Russia	Florida Panthers	Loko Yaroslavl (MHL)
121	Ethan Cardwell (RW)	Canada	San Jose Sharks (from Toronto)^{8}	Surahammars IF (HockeyEttan)
122	Rasmus Korhonen (G)	Finland	Arizona Coyotes (from Pittsburgh)^{9}	Assat U20 (U20 SM-sarja)
123	Carson Latimer (RW)	Canada	Ottawa Senators (from Carolina)^{10}	Edmonton Oil Kings (WHL)
124	Jack Matier (D)	Canada	Nashville Predators (from Colorado via Ottawa)^{11}	Ottawa 67's (OHL)
125	Cameron Berg (C)	United States	New York Islanders	Muskegon Lumberjacks (USHL)
126	Dylan Duke (LW)	United States	Tampa Bay Lightning (from Vegas via Montreal)^{12}	U.S. NTDP (USHL)
127	Josh Pillar (RW)	Canada	Minnesota Wild (from Montreal)^{13}	Kamloops Blazers (WHL)
128	Jakub Demek (C)	Slovakia	Vegas Golden Knights (from Tampa Bay via Detroit)^{14}	HC Kosice (Tipos extraliga)

Notes

1. The Detroit Red Wings' fourth-round pick went to the Vegas Golden Knights as the result of a trade on July 24, 2021, that sent Winnipeg's fourth-round pick and Carolina's fifth-round pick both in 2021 (114th and 155th overall) to Detroit in exchange for this pick.
2. The Los Angeles Kings' fourth-round pick went to the New York Rangers as the result of a trade on March 27, 2021, that sent Brendan Lemieux to Los Angeles in exchange for this pick.
3. The Vancouver Canucks' fourth-round pick went to the Chicago Blackhawks as the result of a trade on April 12, 2021, that sent Madison Bowey and a fifth-round pick in 2021 to Vancouver in exchange for this pick.
4. The Ottawa Senators' fourth-round pick went to the New York Rangers as the result of a trade on October 7, 2019, that sent Vladislav Namestnikov to Ottawa in exchange for Nick Ebert and this pick.
5. The Calgary Flames' fourth-round pick went to the Carolina Hurricanes as the result of a trade on July 24, 2021, that sent a second-round pick in 2021 (59th overall) to Los Angeles in exchange for a third-round pick in 2021 (72nd overall) and this pick.
  Los Angeles previously acquired this pick as the result of a trade on February 24, 2020, that sent Derek Forbort to Calgary in exchange for this pick (being conditional at the time of the trade). The condition – Los Angeles will receive a fourth-round pick in 2021 if Forbort does not re-sign with Calgary for the 2020–21 NHL season – was converted when Forbort signed with the Winnipeg Jets on October 11, 2020.
6. The St. Louis Blues' fourth-round pick went to the Montreal Canadiens as the result of a trade on February 18, 2020, that sent Marco Scandella to St. Louis in exchange for a second-round pick in 2020 and this pick (being conditional at the time of the trade). The condition – Montreal will receive a fourth-round pick in 2021 if Scandella re-signs with the Blues for the 2020–21 NHL season by October 7, 2020 – was converted when Scandella re-signed with the Blues on April 16, 2020.
7. The Winnipeg Jets' fourth-round pick went to the Detroit Red Wings as the result of a trade on July 24, 2021, that sent a fourth-round pick in 2021 (102nd overall) to Vegas in exchange for Carolina's fifth-round pick in 2021 (155th overall) and this pick.
  Vegas previously acquired this pick as the result of a trade on February 21, 2020, that sent Cody Eakin to Winnipeg in exchange for this pick (being conditional at the time of the trade). The condition – Vegas will receive a fourth-round pick in 2021 if Eakin does not re-sign with the Jets for the 2020–21 NHL season – was converted when Eakin signed with the Buffalo Sabres for the 2020–21 NHL season on October 10, 2020.
8. The Toronto Maple Leafs' fourth-round pick went to the San Jose Sharks as the result of a trade on April 11, 2021, that sent Nick Foligno to Toronto in exchange for this pick.
9. The Pittsburgh Penguins' fourth-round pick went to the Arizona Coyotes as the result of a trade on June 29, 2019, that sent Alex Galchenyuk and Pierre-Olivier Joseph to Pittsburgh in exchange for Phil Kessel, Dane Birks and this pick.
10. The Carolina Hurricanes' fourth-round pick went to the Ottawa Senators as the result of a trade on July 24, 2021, that sent Los Angeles' fifth-round pick and a sixth-round pick both in 2021 (136th and 170th overall) to Carolina in exchange for this pick.
11. The Colorado Avalanche's fourth-round pick went to the Nashville Predators as the result of a trade on October 10, 2020, that sent Austin Watson to Ottawa in exchange for this pick.
  Ottawa previously acquired this pick as the result of a trade on February 24, 2020, that sent Vladislav Namestnikov to Colorado in exchange for this pick.
12. The Vegas Golden Knights' fourth-round pick went to the Tampa Bay Lightning as the result of a trade on July 24, 2021, that sent a fourth-round pick in 2022 to Montreal in exchange for this pick.
  Montreal previously acquired this pick as the result of a trade on February 24, 2020, that sent Nick Cousins to Vegas in exchange for this pick.
13. The Montreal Canadiens' fourth-round pick went to the Minnesota Wild as the result of a trade on July 24, 2021, that sent a fifth and seventh-round pick both in 2021 (150th and 214th overall) to Montreal in exchange for this pick.
14. The Tampa Bay Lightning's fourth-round pick went to the Vegas Golden Knights as the result of a trade on July 24, 2021, that sent New Jersey's second-round pick in 2021 (36th overall) to Detroit in exchange for a second-round pick in 2021 (38th overall) and this pick.
  Detroit previously acquired this pick as the result of a trade on April 10, 2021, that sent David Savard to Tampa Bay in exchange for this pick.

=== Round five ===
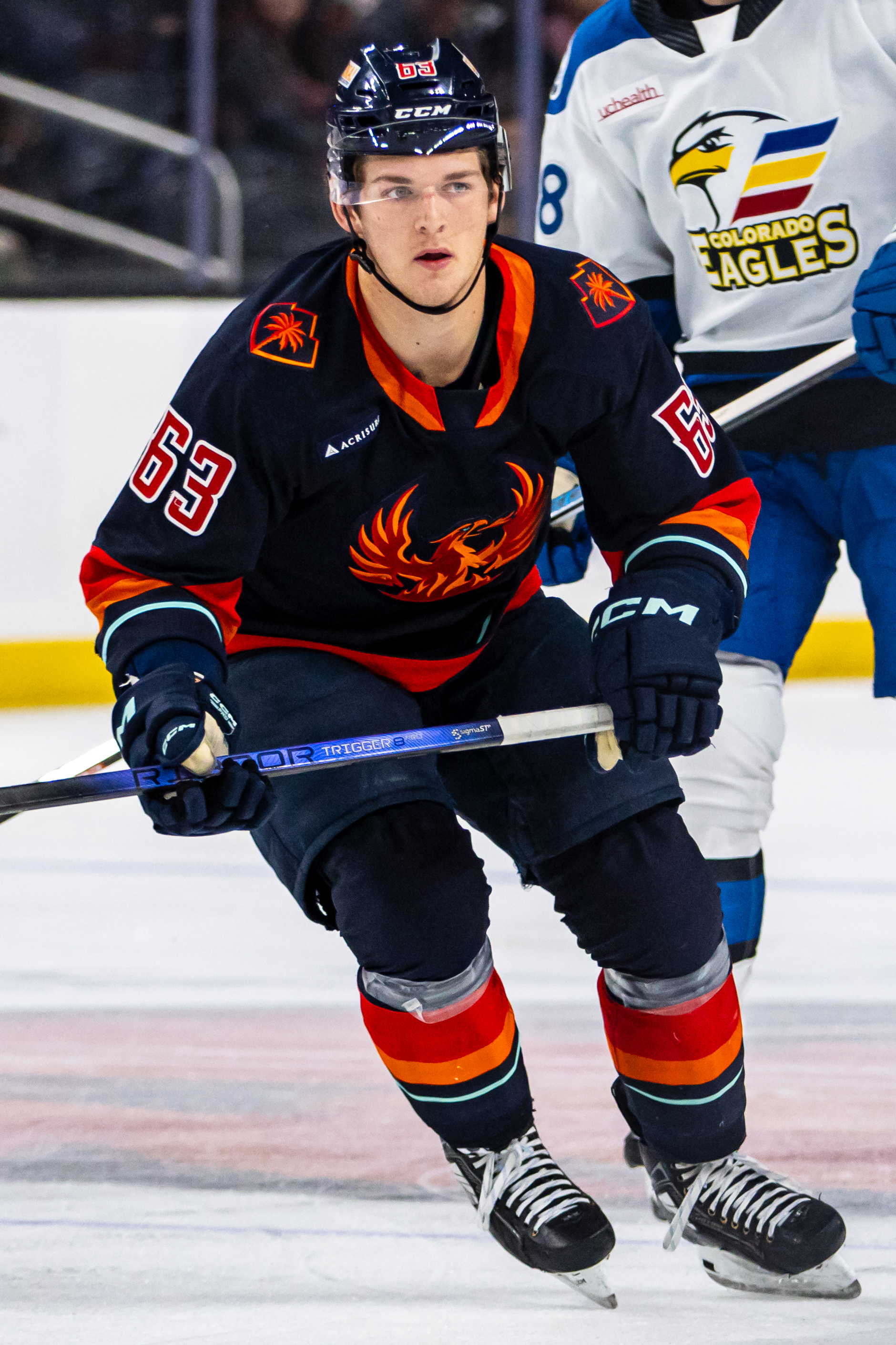
Jacob Melanson was selected 131st overall by the Seattle Kraken.

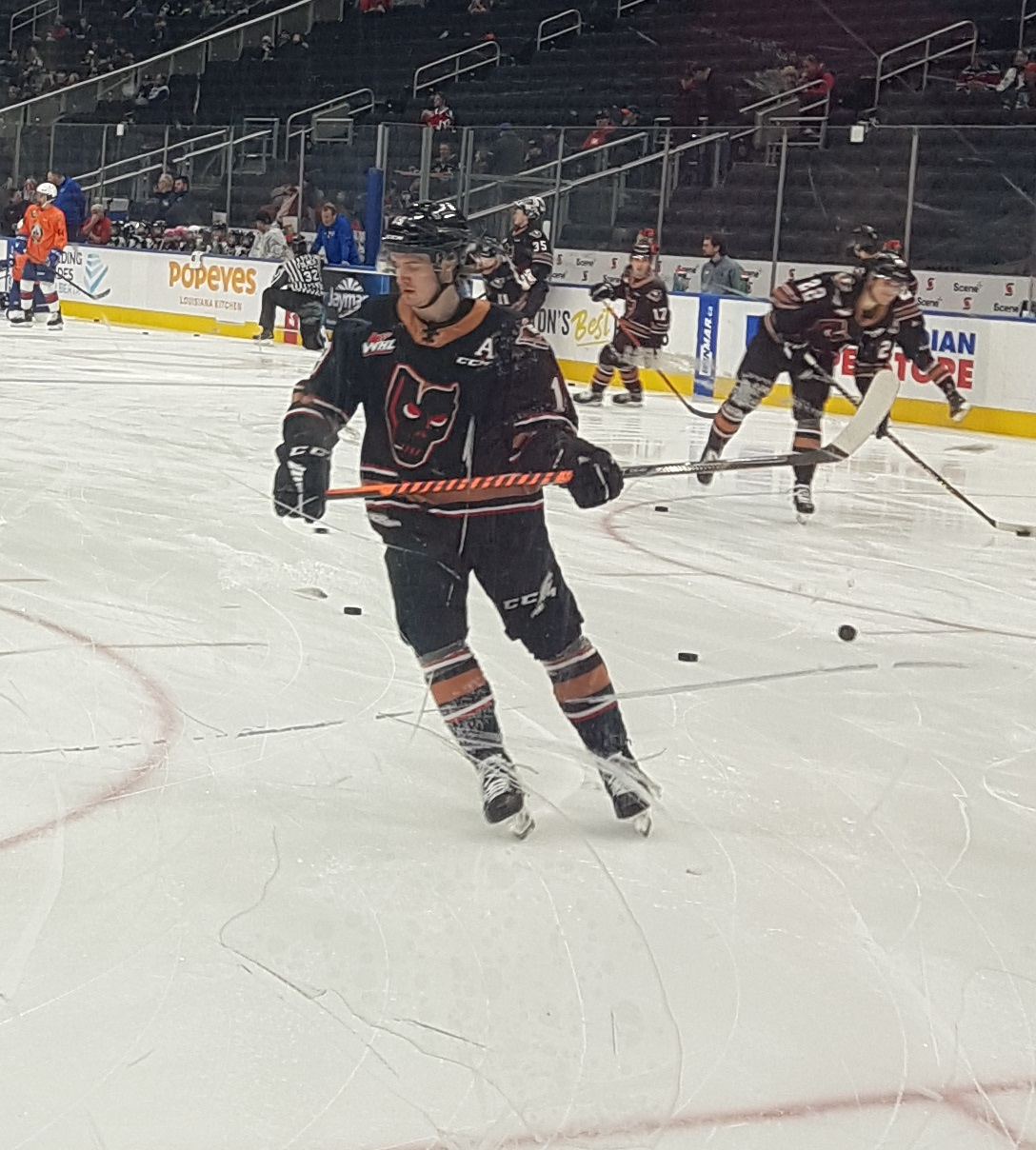
Sean Tschigerl was selected 130th overall by the Anaheim Ducks.

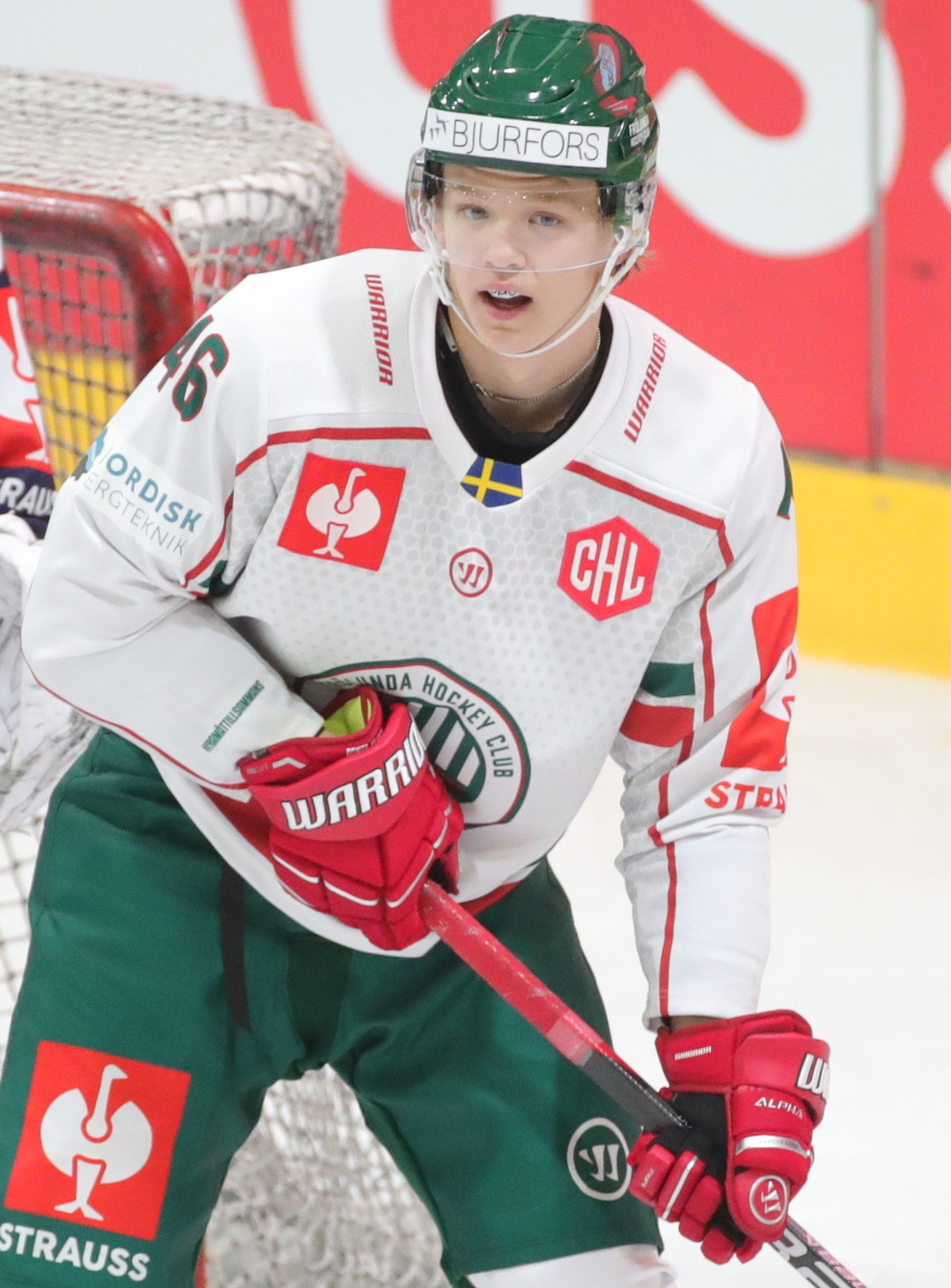
Liam Dower Nilsson was selected 134th overall by the Detroit Red Wings.

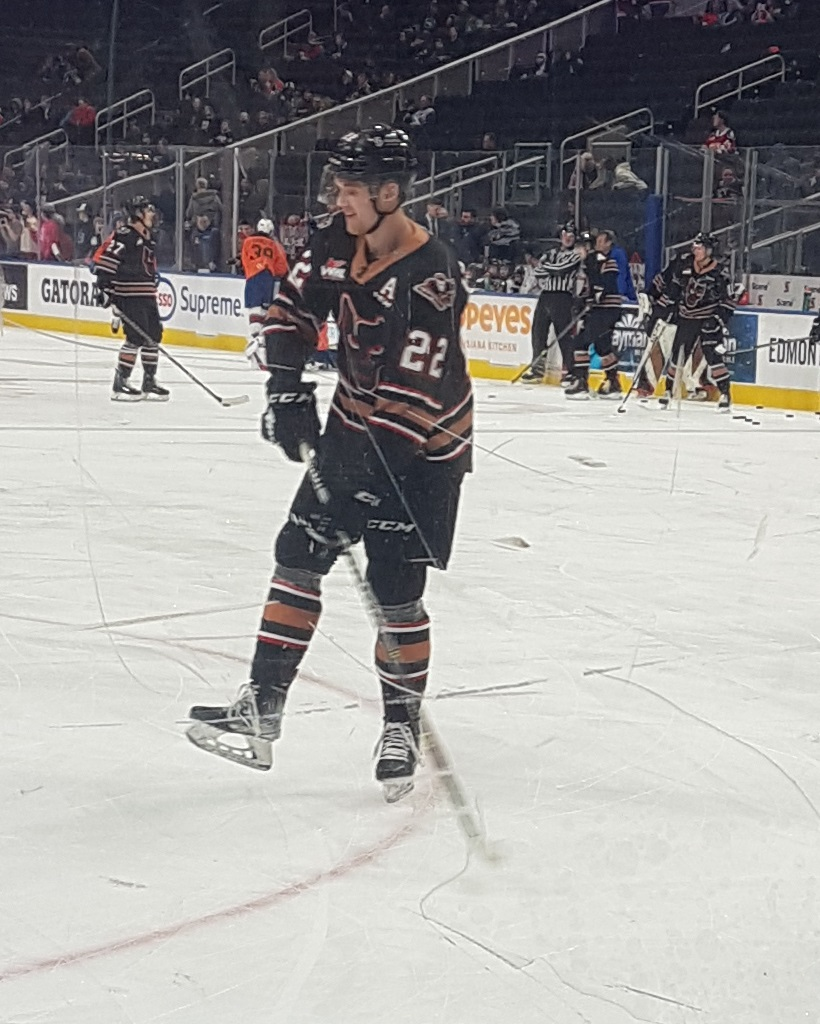
Tyson Galoway was selected 145th overall by the St. Louis Blues.

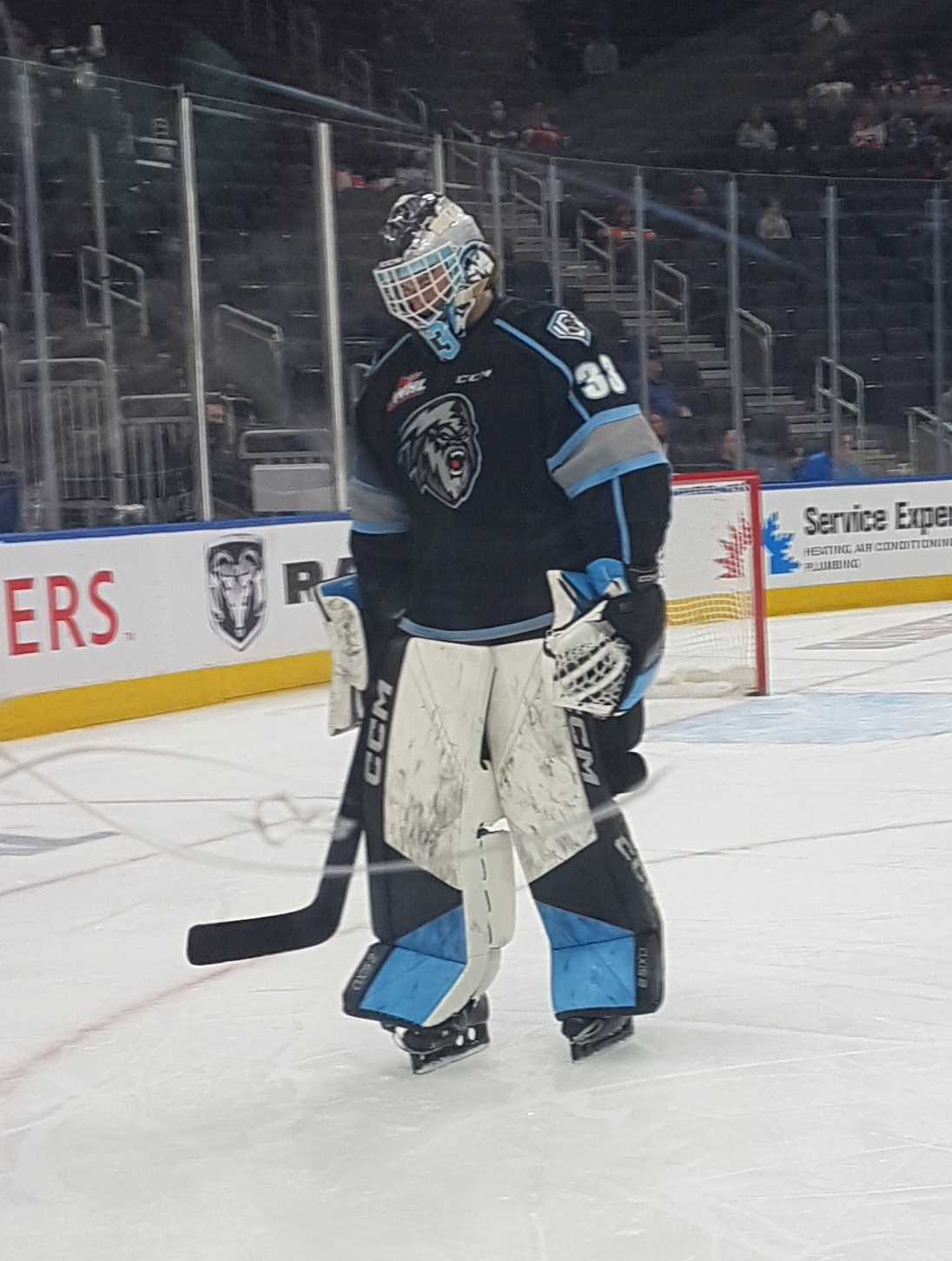
Gage Alexander was selected 148th overall by the Anaheim Ducks.

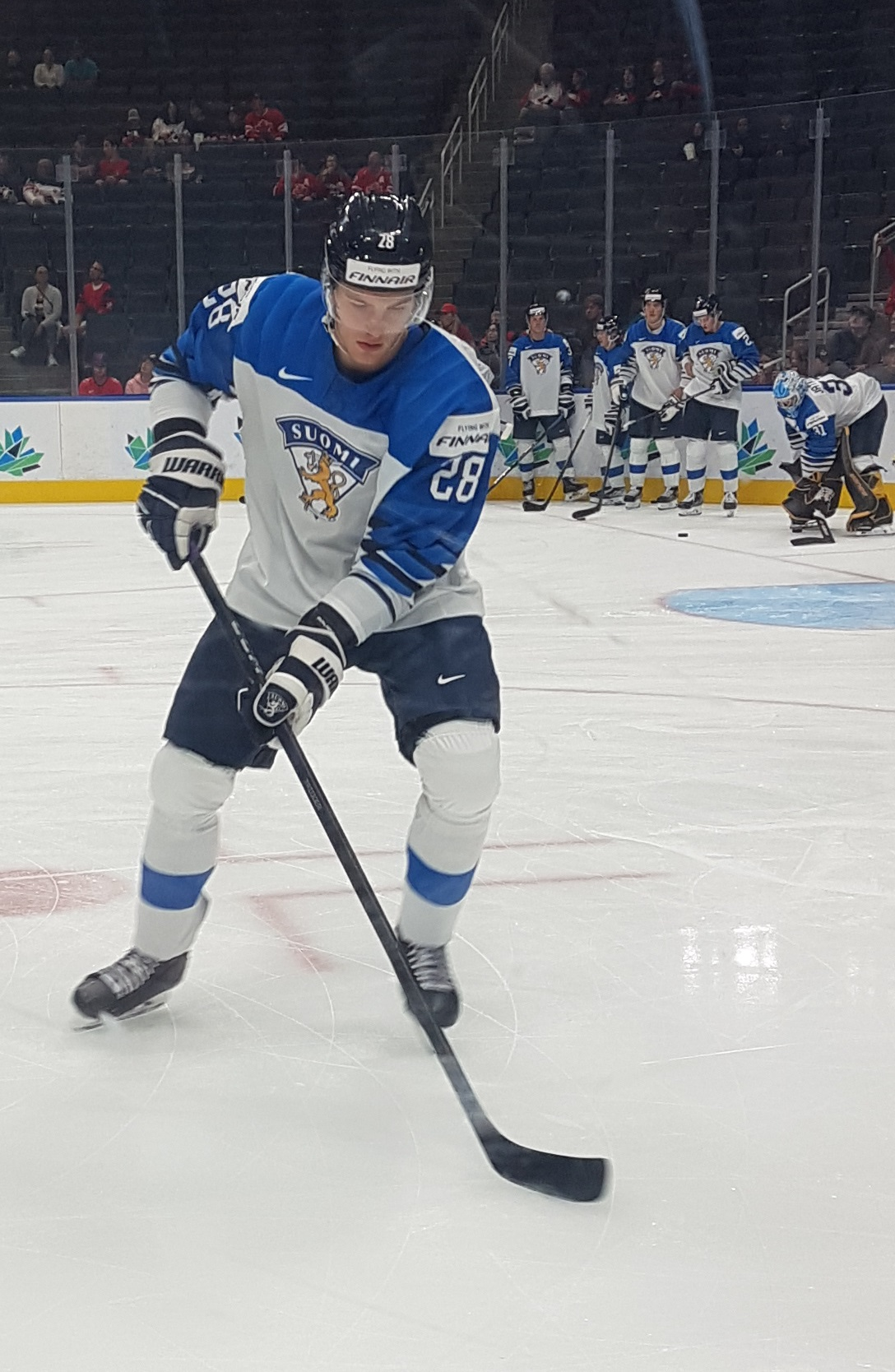
Eetu Liukas was selected 157th overall by the New York Islanders.

#	Player	Nationality	NHL team	College/junior/club team
129	Topias Vilen (D)	Finland	New Jersey Devils (from Buffalo)^{1}	Lahti Pelicans (Liiga)
130	Sean Tschigerl (LW)	Canada	Anaheim Ducks	Calgary Hitmen (WHL)
131	Jacob Melanson (RW)	Canada	Seattle Kraken	Acadie-Bathurst Titan (QMJHL)
132	Nikolai Makarov (D)	Russia	Columbus Blue Jackets (from New Jersey)^{2}	Krasnaya Armiya (MHL)
133	James Malatesta (LW)	Canada	Columbus Blue Jackets	Quebec Remparts (QMJHL)
134	Liam Dower Nilsson (C)	Sweden	Detroit Red Wings	Frolunda U20 (J20 SuperElit)
135	Artem Guryev (D)	Russia	San Jose Sharks	Peterborough Petes (OHL)
136	Robert Orr (C)	Canada	Carolina Hurricanes (from Los Angeles via Ottawa)^{3}	Halifax Mooseheads
137	Aku Koskenvuo (G)	Finland	Vancouver Canucks	HIFK U20 (U20 SM-sarja)
138	Jack Bar (D)	Canada	Dallas Stars (from Ottawa via Montreal and Detroit)^{4}	Chicago Steel (USHL)
139	Manix Landry (C)	Canada	Arizona Coyotes	Gatineau Olympiques (QMJHL)
140	Jonathan Myrenberg (D)	Sweden	Vancouver Canucks (from Chicago)^{5}	Linkoping U20 (J20 SuperElit)
141	Cole Jordan (D)	Canada	Calgary Flames	Moose Jaw Warriors (WHL)
142	Daniil Sobolev (D)	Russia	Montreal Canadiens (from Philadelphia)^{6}	Windsor Spitfires (OHL)
143	Jacob Holmes (D)	Canada	Dallas Stars	Sault Ste. Marie Greyhounds (OHL)
144	Jaroslav Chmelar (RW)	Czech Republic	New York Rangers	Jokerit U20 (U20 SM-sarja)
145	Tyson Galloway (D)	Canada	St. Louis Blues	Calgary Hitmen (WHL)
146	Dmitri Rashevsky (RW)	Russia	Winnipeg Jets	HC Dinamo Saint Petersburg (VHL)
147	Justin Robidas (C)	Canada	Carolina Hurricanes (from Nashville)^{7}	Val-d'Or Foreurs (QMJHL)
148	Gage Alexander (G)	Canada	Anaheim Ducks (from Edmonton via Ottawa)^{8}	Winnipeg Ice (WHL)
149	Oskar Jellvik (C)	Sweden	Boston Bruins	Djurgardens IF (SHL)
150	Joshua Roy (RW)	Canada	Montreal Canadiens (from Minnesota)^{9}	Sherbrooke Phoenix (QMJHL)
151	Haakon Hanelt (F/D)	Germany	Washington Capitals	Eisbaren Berlin (DEL)
152	Kirill Gerasimyuk (G)	Russia	Florida Panthers	SKA Varyagi (VHL)
153	Ty Voit (C/LW)	United States	Toronto Maple Leafs	Sarnia Sting (OHL)
154	Isaac Belliveau (D)	Canada	Pittsburgh Penguins	Gatineau Olympiques (QMJHL)
155	Oscar Plandowski (D)	Canada	Detroit Red Wings (from Carolina via Vegas)^{10}	Charlottetown Islanders (QMJHL)
156	Max McCue (C)	Canada	San Jose Sharks (from Colorado)^{11}	London Knights (OHL)
157	Eetu Liukas (RW)	Finland	New York Islanders	TPS (Liiga)
158	Ty Murchison (D)	United States	Philadelphia Flyers (from Vegas via Washington)^{12}	U.S. NTDP (USHL)
159	Viljami Marjala (LW)	Finland	Buffalo Sabres (from Montreal)^{13}	Quebec Remparts (QMJHL)
160	Cameron MacDonald (C)	Canada	Tampa Bay Lightning	Saint John Sea Dogs (QMJHL)

Notes

1. The Buffalo Sabres' fifth-round pick went to the New Jersey Devils as the result of a trade on February 24, 2020, that sent Wayne Simmonds to Buffalo in exchange for this pick (being conditional at the time of the trade). The condition – New Jersey will receive a fifth-round pick in 2021 if the Sabres do not qualify for the 2020 Stanley Cup playoffs – was converted on May 26, 2020, when it was announced the Sabres would not participate in the 2020 Stanley Cup playoffs.
2. The New Jersey Devils' fifth-round pick went to the Columbus Blue Jackets as the result of a trade on October 8, 2020, that sent Ryan Murray to New Jersey in exchange for this pick.
3. The Los Angeles Kings' fifth-round pick went to the Carolina Hurricanes as the result of a trade on July 24, 2021, that sent a fourth-round pick in 2021 (123rd overall) to Ottawa in exchange for a sixth-round pick in 2021 (170th overall) and this pick.
  Ottawa previously acquired this pick as the result of a trade on July 24, 2021, that sent a second-round pick in 2021 (42nd overall) to Los Angeles in exchange for St. Louis' second-round pick in 2021 (49th overall) and this pick.
4. The Ottawa Senators' fifth-round pick went to the Dallas Stars as the result of a trade on July 23, 2021, that sent a first-round pick in 2021 (15th overall) to Detroit in exchange for Washington's first-round pick and the Rangers' second-round pick both in 2021 (23rd and 48th overall) and this pick.
  Detroit previously acquired this pick as the result of a trade on April 11, 2021, that sent Jon Merrill to Montreal in exchange for Hayden Verbeek and this pick.
  Montreal previously acquired this pick as the result of a trade on January 2, 2020, that sent Mike Reilly to Ottawa in exchange for Andrew Sturtz and this pick.
5. The Chicago Blackhawks' fifth-round pick went to the Vancouver Canucks as the result of a trade on April 12, 2021, that sent a fourth-round pick in 2021 to Chicago in exchange for Madison Bowey and this pick.
6. The Philadelphia Flyers' fifth-round pick went to the Montreal Canadiens as the result of a trade on February 24, 2020, that sent Nate Thompson to Philadelphia in exchange for this pick.
7. The Nashville Predators' fifth-round pick went to the Carolina Hurricanes as the result of a trade on July 24, 2021, that sent Los Angeles' third-round pick in 2021 (72nd overall) to Nashville in exchange for a third-round pick in 2021 (83rd overall) and this pick.
8. The Edmonton Oilers' fifth-round pick went to the Anaheim Ducks as the result of a trade on October 8, 2020, that sent Erik Gudbranson to Ottawa in exchange for this pick.
  Ottawa previously acquired this pick as the result of a trade on February 24, 2020, that sent Tyler Ennis to Edmonton in exchange for this pick.
9. The Minnesota Wild's fifth-round pick went to the Montreal Canadiens as the result of a trade on July 24, 2021, that sent a fourth-round pick in 2021 (127th overall) to Minnesota in exchange for a seventh-round pick in 2021 (214th overall) and this pick.
10. The Carolina Hurricanes' fifth-round pick went to the Detroit Red Wings as the result of a trade on July 24, 2021, that sent a fourth-round pick in 2021 (102nd overall) to Vegas in exchange for Winnipeg's fourth-round pick in 2021 (114th overall) and this pick.
  Vegas previously acquired this pick as the result of a trade on June 26, 2019, that sent Erik Haula to Carolina in exchange for Nicolas Roy and this pick (being conditional at the time of the trade). The condition – Vegas will receive a fifth-round pick in 2021 if Carolina trades Haula for a player, multiple draft picks or if he is traded for a draft pick in the first five rounds of any future draft – was converted when Haula was traded to the Florida Panthers on February 24, 2020.
11. The Colorado Avalanche's fifth-round pick went to the San Jose Sharks as the result of a trade on April 10, 2021, that sent Devan Dubnyk to Colorado in exchange for Greg Pateryn and this pick.
12. The Vegas Golden Knights' fifth-round pick went to the Philadelphia Flyers as the result of a trade on April 12, 2021, that sent Michael Raffl to Washington in exchange for this pick.
  Washington previously acquired this as the result of a trade on December 2, 2019, that sent Chandler Stephenson to Vegas in exchange for this pick.
13. The Montreal Canadiens' fifth-round pick went to the Buffalo Sabres as the result of a trade on March 26, 2021, that sent Eric Staal to Montreal in exchange for a third-round pick in 2021 and this pick.

=== Round six ===
Kyle Kukkonen was selected 162nd overall by the Anaheim Ducks.

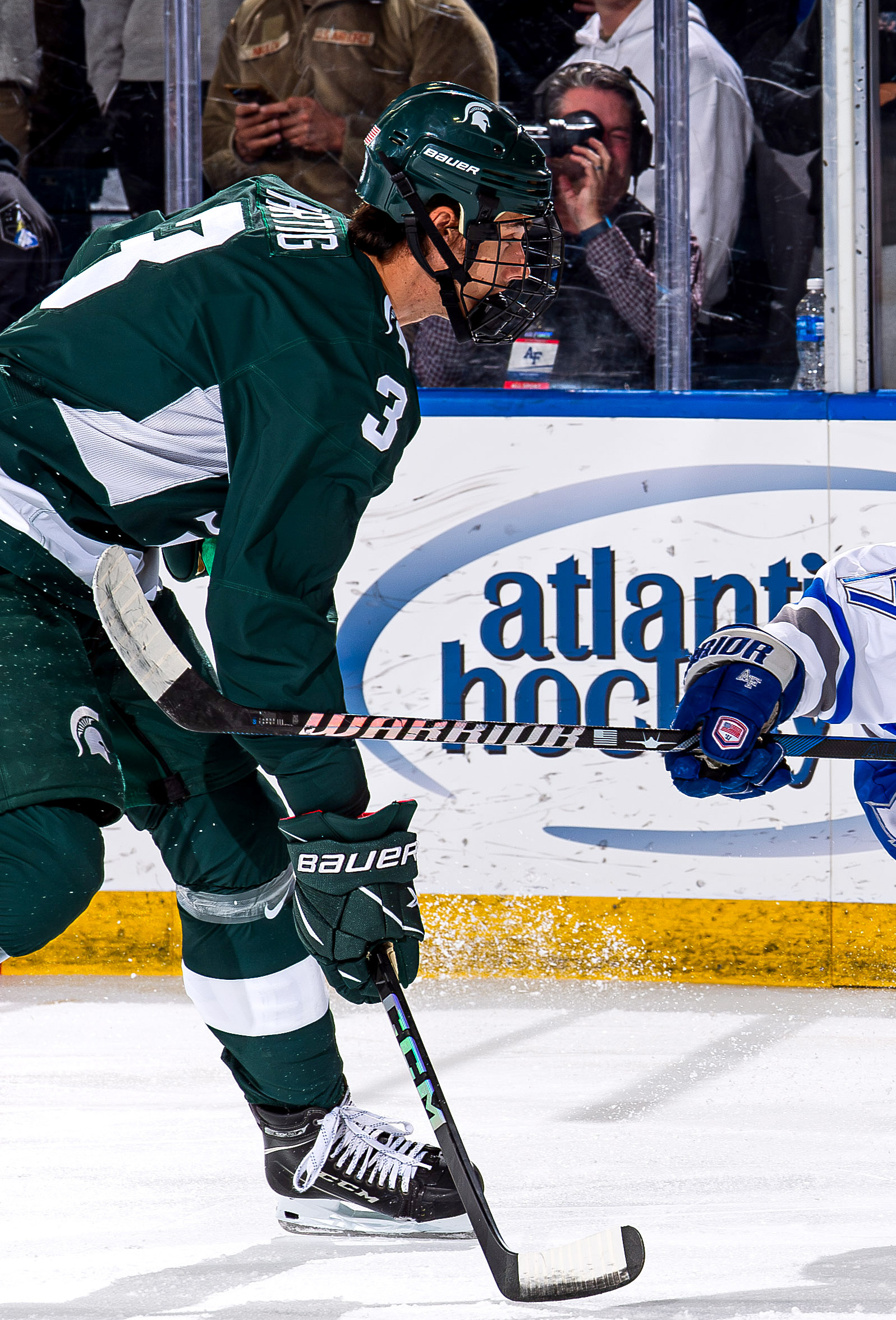
Viktor Hurtig was selected 164th overall by the New Jersey Devils.

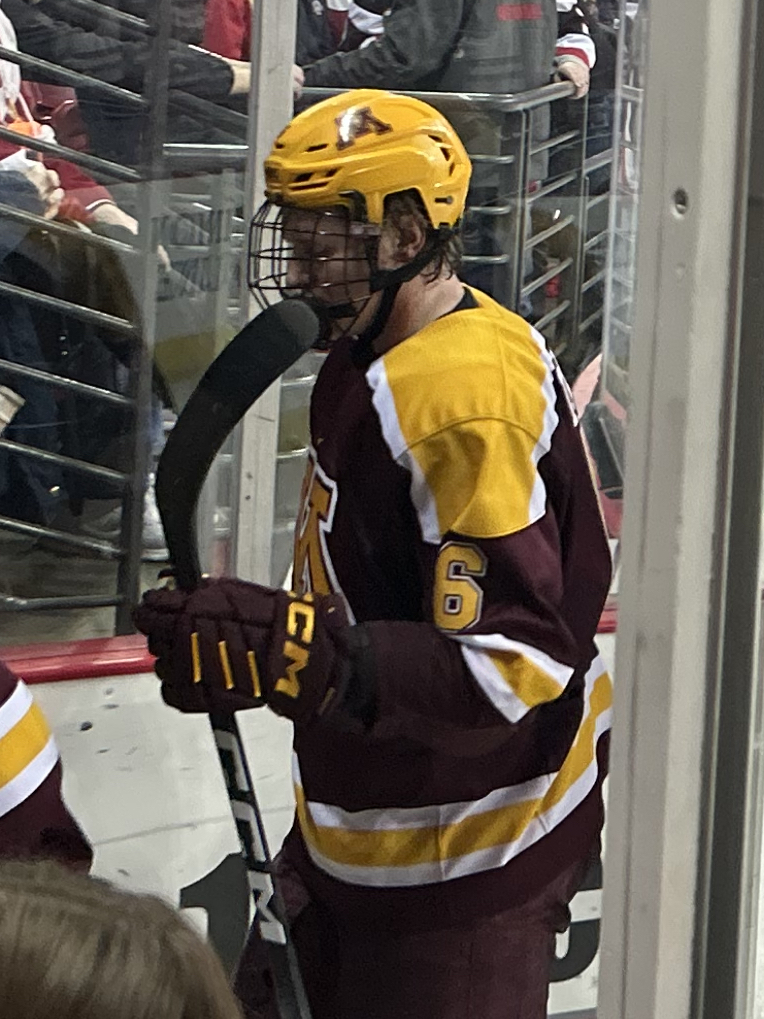
Cal Thomas was selected 171st overall by the Arizona Coyotes.

#	Player	Nationality	NHL team	College/junior/club team
161	William von Barnekow-Lofberg (C)	Sweden	Buffalo Sabres	Malmo Redhawks U20 (J20 SuperElit)
162	Kyle Kukkonen (C)	United States	Anaheim Ducks	Maple Grove Crimson (USHS-MN)
163	Semyon Vyazovoy (G)	Russia	Seattle Kraken	Tolpar Ufa (MHL)
164	Viktor Hurtig (D)	Sweden	New Jersey Devils	Vasteras U20 (J20 SuperElit)
165	Ben Boyd (LW)	Canada	Columbus Blue Jackets	Charlottetown Islanders (QMJHL)
166	Pasquale Zito (LW)	Canada	Detroit Red Wings	Windsor Spitfires (OHL)
167	Liam Gilmartin (LW)	United States	San Jose Sharks	U.S. NTDP (USHL)
168	Jack Beck (RW)	Canada	Calgary Flames (from Los Angeles)^{1}	Ottawa 67's (OHL)
169	Hugo Gabrielson (D)	Sweden	Vancouver Canucks	Frolunda U20 (J20 SuperElit)
170	Bryce Montgomery (D)	United States	Carolina Hurricanes (from Ottawa)^{2}	London Knights (OHL)
171	Cal Thomas (D)	United States	Arizona Coyotes	Maple Grove Crimson (USHS-MN)
172	Ilya Safonov (C)	Russia	Chicago Blackhawks	Irbis Kazan (MHL)
173	Lucas Ciona (LW)	Canada	Calgary Flames	Seattle Thunderbirds (WHL)
174	Ethan Samson (D)	Canada	Philadelphia Flyers	Prince George Cougars (WHL)
175	Francesco Arcuri (C)	Canada	Dallas Stars	Steel Wings Linz (AlpsHL)
176	Dru Krebs (D)	Canada	Washington Capitals (from NY Rangers)^{3}	Medicine Hat Tigers (WHL)
177	Theo Jacobsson (C)	Sweden	San Jose Sharks (from St. Louis)^{4}	Modo U20 (J20 SuperElit)
178	Connor Lockhart (RW)	Canada	Vancouver Canucks (from Winnipeg)^{5}	Erie Otters (OHL)
179	Simon Knak (RW)	Switzerland	Nashville Predators	Portland Winterhawks (WHL)
180	Matvei Petrov (LW)	Russia	Edmonton Oilers	Krylja Sovetov 2 (MHL)
181	Ryan Mast (D)	United States	Boston Bruins	Sarnia Sting (OHL)
182	Nate Benoit (D)	United States	Minnesota Wild	Mount St. Charles Mounties (USHS-RI)
183	Chase Clark (G)	United States	Washington Capitals	Jersey Hitmen (USPHL)
184	Jakub Kos (LW)	Czech Republic	Florida Panthers	Ilves U20 (U20 SM-sarja)
185	Vyacheslav Peksa (G)	Russia	Toronto Maple Leafs	Irbis Kazan (MHL)
186	Shane Lachance (LW)	United States	Edmonton Oilers (from Pittsburgh)^{6}	Boston Junior Bruins (USPHL)
187	Nikita Quapp (G)	Germany	Carolina Hurricanes	Krefeld Pinguine (DEL)
188	Nikita Novikov (D)	Russia	Buffalo Sabres (from Colorado)^{7}	Dynamo Moscow (MHL)
189	Aleksi Malinen (D)	Finland	New York Islanders	JYP U20 (U20 SM-sarja)
190	Artur Cholach (D)	Ukraine	Vegas Golden Knights	Sokil Kyiv (UHL)
191	Xavier Simoneau (C)	Canada	Montreal Canadiens	Drummondville Voltigeurs (QMJHL)
192	Alex Gagne (D)	United States	Tampa Bay Lightning	Muskegon Lumberjacks (USHL)

Notes

1. The Los Angeles Kings' sixth-round pick went to the Calgary Flames as the result of a trade on July 24, 2021, that sent Edmonton's third-round pick in 2021 (84th overall) to Los Angeles in exchange for Toronto's third-round pick in 2021 (89th overall) and this pick.
2. The Ottawa Senators' sixth-round pick went to the Carolina Hurricanes as the result of a trade on July 24, 2021, that sent a fourth-round pick in 2021 (123rd overall) to Ottawa in exchange for Los Angeles' fifth-round pick in 2021 (136th overall) and this pick.
3. The New York Rangers' sixth-round pick went to the Washington Capitals as the result of a trade on July 24, 2021, that sent Arizona's third-round pick in 2021 (75th overall) to New York in exchange for a third-round pick in 2021 (80th overall) and this pick.
4. The St. Louis Blues' sixth-round pick went to the San Jose Sharks as the result of a trade on July 24, 2021, that sent a third-round pick in 2021 (71st overall) to St. Louis in exchange for a third-round pick in 2021 (81st overall) and this pick.
5. The Winnipeg Jets' sixth-round pick went to the Vancouver Canucks as the result of a trade on April 12, 2021, that sent Jordie Benn to Winnipeg in exchange for this pick.
6. The Pittsburgh Penguins' sixth-round pick went to the Edmonton Oilers as the result of a trade on July 26, 2019, that sent John Marino to Pittsburgh in exchange for this pick (being conditional at the time of the trade). The condition – Edmonton will receive a sixth-round pick in 2021 if Marino signs with the Penguins – was converted when Marino signed with the Penguins on August 8, 2019.
7. The Colorado Avalanche's sixth-round pick went to the Buffalo Sabres as the result of a trade on March 20, 2021, that sent Jonas Johansson to Colorado in exchange for this pick.

=== Round seven ===
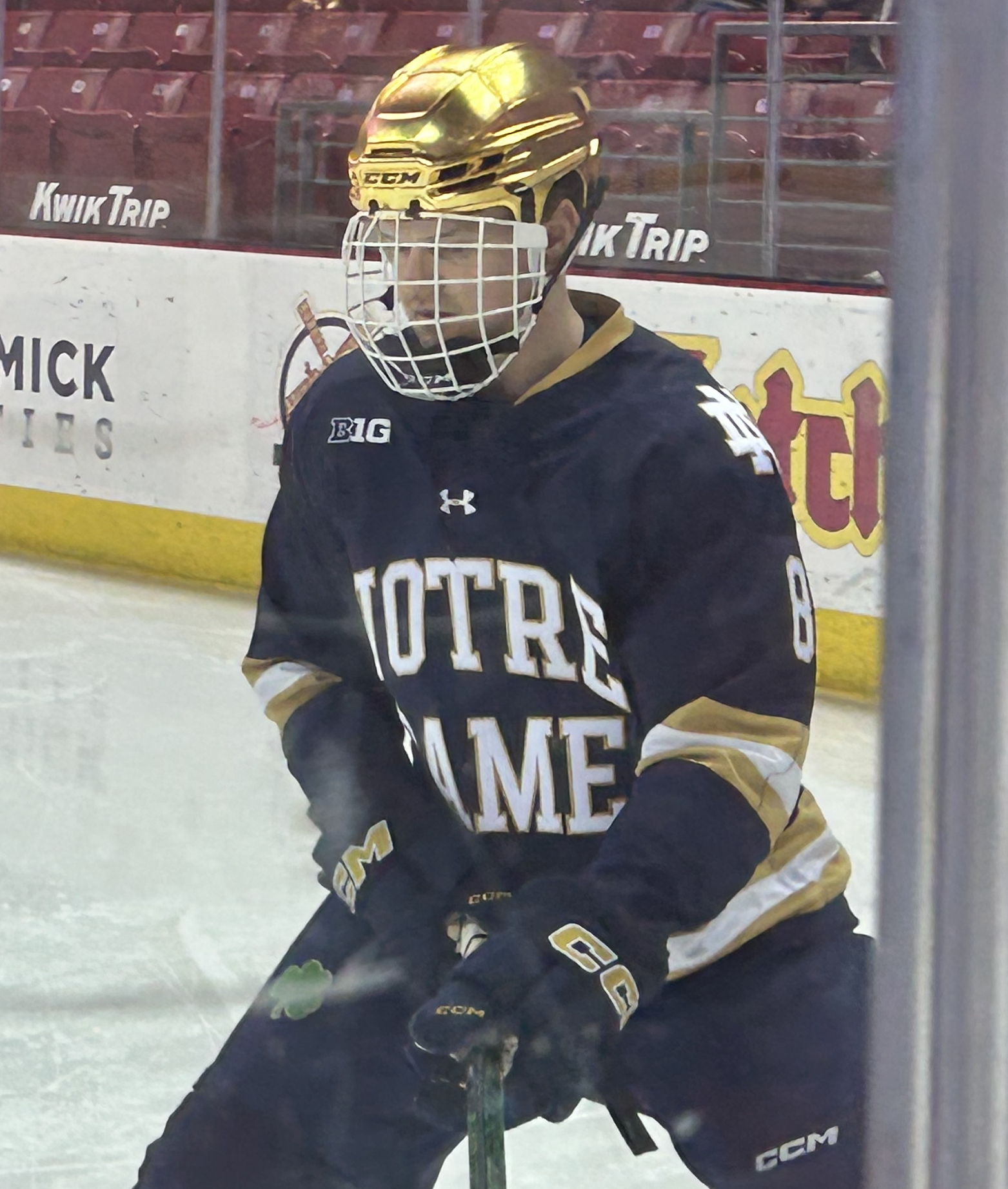
Justin Janicke was selected 195th overall by the Seattle Kraken.

#	Player	Nationality	NHL team	College/junior/club team
193	Tyson Kozak (C)	Canada	Buffalo Sabres	Portland Winterhawks (WHL)
194	Ryan McCleary (D)	Canada	Pittsburgh Penguins (from Anaheim)^{1}	Portland Winterhawks (WHL)
195	Justin Janicke (LW)	United States	Seattle Kraken	U.S. NTDP (USHL)
196	Daniil Pylenkov (D)	Russia	Tampa Bay Lightning (from New Jersey)^{2}	HC Vityaz (KHL)
197	Martin Rysavy (RW)	Czech Republic	Columbus Blue Jackets	Zubr Prerov (Czech 1.liga)
198	Ivan Vorobyov (RW)	Russia	St. Louis Blues (from Detroit)^{3}	Mamonty Yugry (MHL)
199	Evgenii Kashnikov (D)	Russia	San Jose Sharks	Gatineau Olympiques (QMJHL)
200	Yegor Naumov (G)	Russia	Carolina Hurricanes (from Los Angeles)^{4}	Krylja Sovetov 2 (MHL)
201	Lucas Forsell (LW)	Sweden	Vancouver Canucks	Farjestad U20 (J20 SuperElit)
202	Chandler Romeo (D)	Canada	Ottawa Senators	Brantford Bandits (GOJHL)
203	Zakhar Bardakov (C)	Russia	New Jersey Devils (from Arizona)^{5}	Russkiye Vityazi (MHL)
204	Connor Kelley (D)	United States	Chicago Blackhawks	Minnesota Duluth Bulldogs (NCHC)
205	Arsenii Sergeev (G)	Russia	Calgary Flames	Shreveport Mudbugs (NAHL)
206	Owen McLaughlin (C)	United States	Philadelphia Flyers	Mount St. Charles Mounties (USHS-RI)
207	Albert Sjoberg (RW)	Sweden	Dallas Stars	Sodertalje U20 (J20 SuperElit)
208	Hank Kempf (D)	United States	New York Rangers	Muskegon Lumberjacks (USHL)
209	Nikita Guslistov (C)	Russia	Carolina Hurricanes (from St. Louis)^{6}	Severstal Cherepovets (KHL)
210	Braden Hache (D)	United States	Florida Panthers (from Winnipeg)^{7}	Kingston Frontenacs (OHL)
211	Robert Flinton (LW)	United States	Tampa Bay Lightning (from Nashville)^{8}	St. Paul's Pelicans (USHS-I)
212	Maximus Wanner (D)	Canada	Edmonton Oilers	Moose Jaw Warriors (WHL)
213	Andre Gasseau (C)	United States	Boston Bruins	U.S. NTDP (USHL)
214	Joe Vrbetic (G)	Canada	Montreal Canadiens (from Minnesota)^{9}	North Bay Battalion (OHL)
215	Daniel Laatsch (D)	United States	Pittsburgh Penguins (from Washington)^{10}	Sioux City Musketeers (USHL)
216	Jalen Luypen (C)	Canada	Chicago Blackhawks (from Florida)^{11}	Edmonton Oil Kings (WHL)
217	Ty Gallagher (D)	United States	Boston Bruins (from Toronto)^{12}	U.S. NTDP (USHL)
218	Kirill Tankov (C)	Russia	Pittsburgh Penguins	SKA Varyagi (MHL)
219	Joel Nystrom (D)	Sweden	Carolina Hurricanes	Farjestad BK (SHL)
220	Taylor Makar (LW)	Canada	Colorado Avalanche	Brooks Bandits (AJHL)
221	Tomas Machu (D)	Czech Republic	New York Islanders	Draci Sumperk (Czech 1.liga)
222	Carl Lindbom (G)	Sweden	Vegas Golden Knights	Djurgardens IF U20 (J20 SuperElit)
223	Samuel Lipkin (LW)	United States	Arizona Coyotes (from Montreal via Chicago and Montreal)^{13}	Chicago Steel (USHL)
224	Niko Huuhtanen (RW)	Finland	Tampa Bay Lightning	Tappara U20 (U20 SM-sarja)

Notes

1. The Anaheim Ducks' seventh-round pick went to the Pittsburgh Penguins as the result of a trade on October 25, 2019, that sent Erik Gudbranson to Anaheim in exchange for Andreas Martinsen and this pick.
2. The New Jersey Devils' seventh-round pick went to the Tampa Bay Lightning as the result of a trade on November 1, 2019, that sent Louis Domingue to New Jersey in exchange for this pick (being conditional at the time of the trade). The condition – Tampa Bay will receive a seventh-round pick in 2021 if Domingue plays in seven games for the Devils during the 2019–20 NHL season – was converted on January 9, 2020.
3. The Detroit Red Wings' seventh-round pick went to the St. Louis Blues as the result of a trade on October 7, 2020, that sent Chicago's seventh-round pick in 2020 (203rd overall) to Detroit in exchange for this pick.
4. The Los Angeles Kings' seventh-round pick went to the Carolina Hurricanes as the result of a trade on October 7, 2020, that sent Montreal's fifth-round pick in 2020 (140th overall) to Los Angeles in exchange for a sixth-round pick in 2020 and this pick.
5. The Arizona Coyotes' seventh-round pick went to the New Jersey Devils as the result of a trade on October 7, 2020, that sent a seventh-round pick in 2020 (192nd overall) to Arizona in exchange for this pick.
6. The St. Louis Blues' seventh-round pick went to the Carolina Hurricanes as the result of a trade on September 24, 2019, that sent Justin Faulk and a fifth-round pick in 2020 to St. Louis in exchange for Joel Edmundson, Dominik Bokk and this pick.
7. The Winnipeg Jets' seventh-round pick went to the Florida Panthers as the result of a trade on February 25, 2019, that sent Bogdan Kiselevich to Winnipeg in exchange for this pick.
8. The Nashville Predators' seventh-round pick went to the Tampa Bay Lightning as the result of a trade on June 14, 2019, that sent Connor Ingram to Nashville in exchange for this pick.
9. The Minnesota Wild's seventh-round pick went to the Montreal Canadiens as the result of a trade on July 24, 2021, that sent a fourth-round pick in 2021 (127th overall) to Minnesota in exchange for a fifth-round pick in 2021 (150th overall) and this pick.
10. The Washington Capitals' seventh-round pick went to the Pittsburgh Penguins as the result of a trade on October 7, 2020, that sent Colorado's seventh-round pick in 2020 (211th overall) to Washington in exchange for this pick.
11. The Florida Panthers' seventh-round pick went to the Chicago Blackhawks as the result of a trade on April 8, 2021, that sent Lucas Carlsson and Lucas Wallmark to Florida in exchange for Brett Connolly, Riley Stillman, Henrik Borgstrom and this pick.
12. The Toronto Maple Leafs' seventh-round pick went to the Boston Bruins as the result of a trade on October 7, 2020, that sent a seventh-round pick in 2020 (213th overall) to Toronto in exchange for this pick.
13. The Montreal Canadiens' seventh-round pick went Arizona Coyotes as the result of a trade on July 24, 2021, that sent St. Louis' seventh-round pick in 2022 to Montreal in exchange for this pick.
  Montreal previously re-acquired this pick as the result of a trade on October 7, 2020, that sent Ottawa's seventh-round pick in 2020 to Chicago in exchange for this pick.
  Chicago previously acquired this pick as the result of a trade on June 30, 2019, that sent second and seventh-round picks both in 2020 and a third-round pick in 2021 to Montreal in exchange for Andrew Shaw and this pick.

== Draftees based on nationality ==
Rank	Country	Selections	Percent	Top selection
	North America	134	59.8%	
1	Canada	89	39.7%	Owen Power, 1st
2	United States	45	20.1%	Matty Beniers, 2nd
	Eurasia	90	40.2%	
3	Russia	29	13.0%	Fedor Svechkov, 19th
4	Sweden	23	10.3%	Simon Edvinsson, 6th
5	Finland	16	7.2%	Aleksi Heimosalmi, 44th
6	Czech Republic	8	3.6%	Stanislav Svozil, 69th
7	Belarus	3	1.3%	Danila Klimovich, 41st
7	Switzerland	3	1.3%	Janis Moser, 60th
7	Germany	3	1.3%	Luca Munzenberger, 90th
10	Kazakhstan	1	0.4%	Andrei Buyalsky, 92nd
10	Norway	1	0.4%	Emil Martinsen Lilleberg, 107th
10	Slovakia	1	0.4%	Jakub Demek, 128th
10	Ukraine	1	0.4%	Artur Cholach, 190th

=== North American draftees by state/province ===
Rank	State/province	Selections	Percent	Top selection
1	Ontario	29	13.0%	Owen Power, 1st
2	Alberta	16	7.2%	Dylan Guenther, 9th
3	Quebec	15	6.7%	Zachary Bolduc, 17th
4	British Columbia	10	4.5%	Kent Johnson, 5th
5	Minnesota	8	3.6%	Jack Peart, 54th
6	Saskatchewan	7	3.1%	Cole Sillinger, 11th
7	Nova Scotia	6	2.7%	Riley Kidney, 63rd
8	Michigan	4	1.8%	Luke Hughes, 4th
8	Manitoba	4	1.8%	Carson Lambos, 26th
8	California	4	1.8%	Shai Buium, 36th
11	New York	3	1.3%	Matthew Coronato, 13th
11	Arizona	3	1.3%	Josh Doan, 37th
11	Illinois	3	1.3%	Sean Behrens, 61st
11	Pennsylvania	3	1.3%	Ty Voit, 153rd
11	New Hampshire	3	1.3%	Nate Benoit, 182nd
16	Massachusetts	2	0.9%	Matty Beniers, 2nd
16	Connecticut	2	0.9%	Matthew Samoskevich, 24th
16	Florida	2	0.9%	Sasha Pastujov, 66th
19	New Jersey	1	0.4%	Tyler Boucher, 10th
19	Kansas	1	0.4%	Chaz Lucius, 18th
19	Newfoundland and Labrador	1	0.4%	Zach Dean, 30th
19	New Brunswick	1	0.4%	Cole Huckins, 77th
19	Texas	1	0.4%	Brent Johnson, 80th
19	North Dakota	1	0.4%	Cameron Berg, 125th
19	Ohio	1	0.4%	Dylan Duke, 126th
19	Virginia	1	0.4%	Liam Gilmartin, 167th
19	Maryland	1	0.4%	Bryce Montgomery, 170th
19	Wisconsin	1	0.4%	Daniel Laatsch, 215th

== Broadcasting ==
In Canada, coverage of the draft was televised on Sportsnet.

In the United States, following the expiration of the NHL's media deal with NBC Sports, coverage of the draft was televised on ESPN2, marking the first time the Draft aired on the ESPN networks since the 2003 draft.

== See also ==
- 2017–18 NHL transactions
- 2018–19 NHL transactions
- 2019–20 NHL transactions
- 2020–21 NHL transactions
- 2021–22 NHL transactions
- 2021–22 NHL season
- 2021 NHL expansion draft
- List of first overall NHL draft picks
- List of NHL players
