= Jake Neighbours =

Canadian ice hockey player (born 2002)

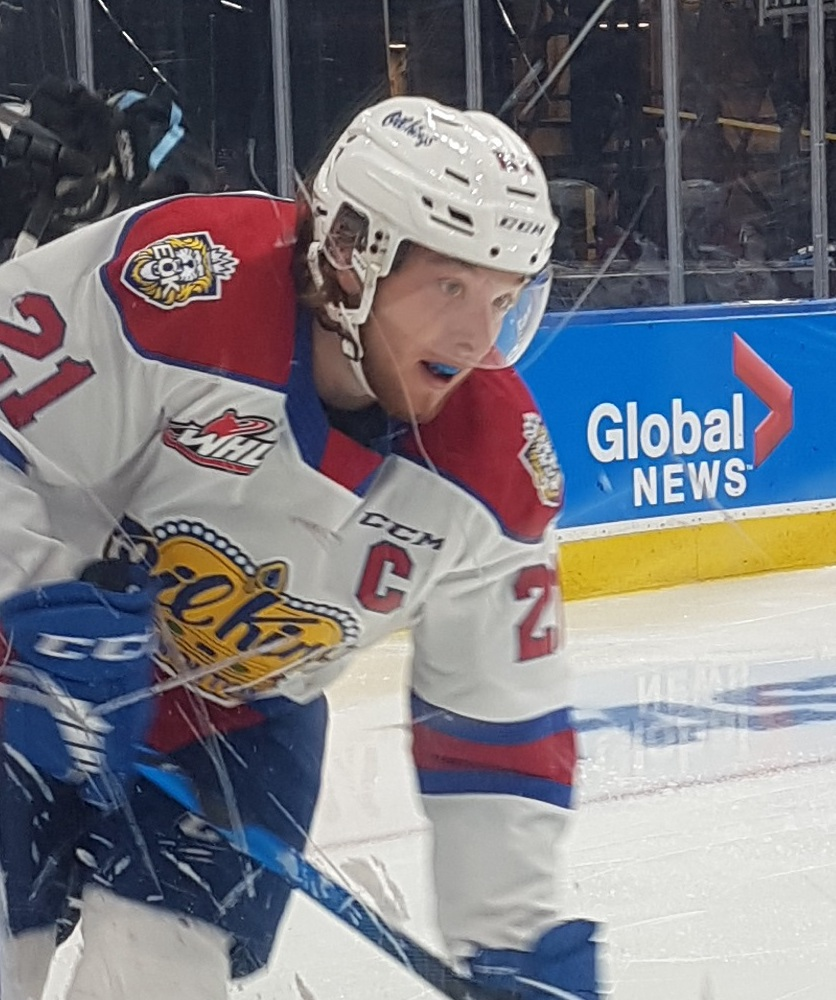
- Neighbours with the Edmonton Oil Kings in 2022
- Born: March 29, 2002 (age 24) Airdrie, Alberta, Canada
- Height: 5 ft 11 in (180 cm)
- Weight: 201 lb (91 kg; 14 st 5 lb)
- Position: Winger
- Shoots: Left
- NHL team: St. Louis Blues
- National team: Canada
- NHL draft: 26th overall, 2020; St. Louis Blues
- Playing career: 2021–present

Jake Neighbours (born March 29, 2002) is a Canadian professional ice hockey player who is a winger and alternate captain for the St. Louis Blues of the National Hockey League (NHL). He was drafted by the Blues in the first round of the 2020 NHL entry draft with the 26th overall pick.

== Early life ==
Neighbours was born on March 29, 2002, in Airdrie, Alberta, Canada. When praised for his maturity, he cites the wide age gap between his half and step-siblings as the reason. In an interview, he said "once you get to the age of 10 or 11 and your brothers are 14 years older than you, your brothers don't want to hang out with you anymore if you're going to be an annoying kid. So I've learned from a young age to be mature and relaxed so my brothers would want me around."

== Playing career ==
=== Junior ===
Growing up in Alberta, Neighbours competed with the Calgary Midget AAA Buffaloes of the Alberta Midget AAA Hockey League and Airdrie Xtreme in the Alberta Major Bantam Hockey League. He transferred from the Xtreme to the Kelowna Pursuit of Excellence Bantam Prep team before being drafted fourth overall pick in the 2017 Western Hockey League (WHL) bantam draft by the Edmonton Oil Kings. During his draft-eligible year, Neighbours recorded 68 points in 30 regular-season games and 11 points in the playoffs.

Neighbours joined the Oil Kings for their 2018–19 season, recording 24 points in 47 regular-season games and earning two WHL Rookie of the Month awards. His play helped push the Oil Kings into the post-season, where he was the team's only rookie to score during the playoffs. After returning from a loss with Canada White, Neighbours suffered an upper-body injury during a fight against a Red Deer Rebels player and was forced to sit out for 12 games. Upon returning to the lineup in February, he was given a five-minute major for boarding and game misconduct, followed by a four-game suspension. In his sophomore season with the Oil Kings, Neighbours averaged more than one point per game, tallying 70 points in 64 regular-season games before the WHL season was halted due to the COVID-19 pandemic. Prior to the pause in the season, he was invited to participate at the CHL/NHL Top Prospects Game and was ranked 30th amongst all North American Skaters by the NHL Central Scouting Bureau's Midterm Draft Rankings. He was also the recipient of teams' Most Improved Player Award and Scholastic Award, having previously named to the league's named to WHL Academic Spotlight for December as a student at Salisbury Composite High School.

=== Professional ===
==== St. Louis Blues ====
Leading up to the 2020 NHL entry draft, Neighbours was ranked 26th among North American skaters, a boost from his previous rank of 30. He was eventually drafted in the first round, 26th overall, of the 2020 NHL Draft by the St. Louis Blues. Neighbours began the 2020–21 season with signing a three-year entry-level contract with the Blues on October 17, 2020. He attended the Blues' training camp but was reassigned to their American Hockey League (AHL) affiliate, the Utica Comets, to begin the season as he is eligible to be on the AHL roster until his junior season starts.

Neighbours made the Blues opening night roster for the 2021–22 season and made his NHL debut on October 16, 2021 at Ball Arena against the Colorado Avalanche where the Blues won 5–3 and Neighbours registered 9:00 minutes of ice time, three hits, and one shot on goal. In his second game against the Arizona Coyotes on October 18, 2021, Neighbours recorded his first NHL point as he recorded the primary assist after making a nifty play behind the net and dishing it to Klim Kostin who would score a goal which wound up as the game winning goal in a Blues 7–4 victory. In the second period of his fourth game against the Los Angeles Kings, Neighbours received a pass from Brayden Schenn and put the puck past Kings goalie Cal Petersen to score his first career NHL goal. The goal made it 4–1 Blues and they ended up winning the game 7–3, meaning Neighbours’ goal was the game winning goal.

After playing the first nine games of the Blues season, Neighbours was sent back to the WHL to return to the Edmonton Oil Kings. During the 2021–22 WHL season, Neighbours recorded 17 goals and 28 assists in 30 regular season games along with three goals and 14 assists in 19 playoff games as the Oil Kings eventually defeated the Seattle Thunderbirds in six games to win the Ed Chynoweth Cup.

== International play ==
Medal record

Representing Canada

Ice hockey

World Championships
Gold medal – first place	2023 Finland/Latvia	

On October 16, 2018, Neighbours and Oil Kings teammate Sebastian Cossa were two of 66 players selected to represent Canada at the 2018 World U-17 Hockey Challenge. Prior to the start of the tournament, Neighbours named captain of Canada White while Kaiden Guhle of the Prince Albert Raiders was selected to lead Canada Red. The following year, Neighbours was named to the Canada men's national junior ice hockey team for the 2019 Hlinka Gretzky Cup, where he helped them win a silver medal.

== Career statistics ==
=== Regular season and playoffs ===
			Regular season					Playoffs
Season	Team	League	GP	G	A	Pts	PIM	GP	G	A	Pts	PIM
2017–18	Calgary Buffaloes	AMHL	33	26	31	57	12	5	1	3	4	12
2017–18	Edmonton Oil Kings	WHL	11	0	4	4	6	—	—	—	—	—
2018–19	Edmonton Oil Kings	WHL	47	11	13	24	25	16	4	8	12	10
2019–20	Edmonton Oil Kings	WHL	64	23	47	70	39	—	—	—	—	—
2020–21	Edmonton Oil Kings	WHL	19	9	24	33	17	—	—	—	—	—
2021–22	St. Louis Blues	NHL	9	1	1	2	2	—	—	—	—	—
2021–22	Edmonton Oil Kings	WHL	30	17	28	45	38	19	3	14	17	16
2022–23	St. Louis Blues	NHL	43	6	4	10	24	—	—	—	—	—
2022–23	Springfield Thunderbirds	AHL	23	9	7	16	2	—	—	—	—	—
2023–24	St. Louis Blues	NHL	77	27	11	38	21	—	—	—	—	—
2024–25	St. Louis Blues	NHL	82	22	24	46	56	7	1	5	6	16
2025–26	St. Louis Blues	NHL	69	15	21	36	43	—	—	—	—	—
NHL totals			280	71	61	132	146	7	1	5	6	16

=== International ===
Year	Team	Event	Result	GP	G	A	Pts	PIM
2018	Canada White	U17	6th	5	3	3	6	2
2019	Canada	HG18	2nd place, silver medalist(s)	5	0	0	0	4
2023	Canada	WC	1st place, gold medalist(s)	10	1	4	5	2
Junior totals				10	3	3	6	6
Senior totals				10	1	4	5	2

== Awards and achievements ==
Award	Year	Ref
WHL
Ed Chynoweth Cup	2022	

Awards and achievements
Preceded by Dominik Bokk	St. Louis Blues first-round draft pick 2021	Succeeded by Zachary Bolduc
