= 2021–22 WHL season =

- League: Western Hockey League
- Sport: Ice hockey
- Duration: Regular season October 1, 2021 – April 17, 2022; Playoffs; April 21, 2022 – June 13, 2022
- Teams: 22
- TV partner(s): KRCW-TV, KZJO, CBC, TSN, RDS

Regular season
- Scotty Munro Memorial Trophy: Winnipeg Ice (1)
- Season MVP: Logan Stankoven (Kamloops Blazers)
- Top scorer: Arshdeep Bains (Red Deer Rebels)

Playoffs
- Playoffs MVP: Kaiden Guhle (Oil Kings)
- Finals champions: Edmonton Oil Kings (3)
- Runners-up: Seattle Thunderbirds

WHL seasons
- 2020–21 2022–23

2021–22 CHL seasons
- League: Canadian Hockey League
- Sport: Ice hockey
- Duration: OHL; October 2021–May 2022; QMJHL; October 2021–May 2022; WHL; October 2021–June 2022
- Teams: 60
- TV partner(s): CBC Television/Gem, TSN, RDS, Rogers TV, Shaw TV
- Season MVP: Logan Stankoven (Kamloops Blazers) (WHL)
- Top scorer: Wyatt Johnston (Windsor Spitfires) (OHL)

Memorial Cup
- Finals champions: Saint John Sea Dogs (QMJHL) (2nd title)
- Runners-up: Hamilton Bulldogs (OHL)

The 2021–22 WHL season was the 56th season of the Western Hockey League (WHL). The league played a full regular season schedule for the first time since the 2018–19 season. The season began on October 1, 2021, and ended on April 17, 2022.

The WHL announced in the summer of 2021 that no inter-conference games would be played during the regular season. On August 16, the WHL announced a mandatory COVID-19 vaccination policy for players, hockey operations staff, officials, and all other employees who would regularly interact with players. On September 8, the WHL announced that due to COVID-19 border restrictions, the schedule had been re-aligned so that the B.C. Division and U.S. Division would not play inter-division games until at least November. The Winnipeg Ice, playing their first full WHL season since relocating from Cranbrook, British Columbia in 2019—with their first two seasons shortened by the COVID-19 pandemic—won their first Scotty Munro Memorial Trophy for topping the regular season standings.

The playoffs—the first since 2019—began on April 22 and ended on June 13. The Edmonton Oil Kings won their third Ed Chynoweth Cup, defeating the Seattle Thunderbirds and earning the right to participate in the 2022 Memorial Cup tournament, which was hosted by the Saint John Sea Dogs of the Quebec Major Junior Hockey League at TD Station in Saint John, New Brunswick.

Map of WHL, 2019–20 to 2022–23
East Division
Central Division
BC Division
US Division

== Standings ==
=== Conference standings ===
Western Conference
Pos	Div	Team	Pld	W	L	OTL	SOL	GF	GA	Pts
1	U.S.	x, y – Everett Silvertips	68	45	13	5	5	280	190	100
2	B.C.	x, y – Kamloops Blazers	68	48	17	3	0	287	176	99
3	U.S.	x – Portland Winterhawks	68	47	16	3	2	298	192	99
4	U.S.	x – Seattle Thunderbirds	68	44	18	4	2	271	179	94
5	B.C.	x – Kelowna Rockets	68	42	20	1	5	250	207	90
6	B.C.	x – Prince George Cougars	68	24	39	4	1	177	240	53
7	U.S.	x – Spokane Chiefs	68	24	39	4	1	188	289	53
8	B.C.	x – Vancouver Giants	68	24	39	5	0	185	254	53
9	B.C.	e – Victoria Royals	68	23	39	5	1	193	275	52
10	U.S.	e – Tri-City Americans	68	19	43	6	0	179	306	44

Source: "Standings". CHL.ca. WHL.
e – eliminated from playoff contention; x – clinched playoff; y – clinched division

Eastern Conference
Pos	Div	Team	Pld	W	L	OTL	SOL	GF	GA	Pts
1	East	x, y, z – Winnipeg Ice	66	53	10	3	0	317	152	109
2	Central	x, y – Edmonton Oil Kings	67	50	14	3	0	295	182	103
3	Central	x – Red Deer Rebels	66	45	19	2	0	264	188	92
4	East	x – Moose Jaw Warriors	65	37	24	4	0	251	221	78
5	East	x – Saskatoon Blades	67	38	26	3	0	219	217	79
6	East	x – Brandon Wheat Kings	66	35	28	3	0	218	242	73
7	Central	x – Lethbridge Hurricanes	67	33	30	4	0	216	238	70
8	East	x – Prince Albert Raiders	67	28	35	4	0	194	225	60
9	East	e – Regina Pats	66	27	36	3	0	240	277	57
10	Central	e – Swift Current Broncos	66	26	35	5	0	181	246	57
11	Central	e – Calgary Hitmen	66	25	34	7	0	183	229	57
12	Central	e – Medicine Hat Tigers	67	11	53	3	0	154	315	25

Source: "Standings". CHL.ca. WHL.
e – eliminated from playoff contention; x – clinched playoff; y – clinched division; z – clinched conference title

== Statistical leaders ==
=== Scoring leaders ===
Players are listed by points, then goals.

Note: GP = Games played; G = Goals; A = Assists; Pts. = Points; PIM = Penalty minutes

Player	Team	GP	G	A	Pts	PIM
Arshdeep Bains	Red Deer Rebels	68	43	69	112	56
Ben King	Red Deer Rebels	68	52	53	105	57
Logan Stankoven	Kamloops Blazers	59	45	59	104	16
Connor Bedard	Regina Pats	62	51	49	100	42
Kyle Crnkovic	Saskatoon Blades	68	39	55	94	20
Dylan Guenther	Edmonton Oil Kings	59	45	46	91	45
Matthew Savoie	Winnipeg Ice	65	35	55	90	32
Jared Davidson	Seattle Thunderbirds	64	42	47	89	68
Cross Hanas	Portland Winterhawks	63	26	60	86	73
Alex Swetlikoff	Everett Silvertips	68	33	51	84	69

=== Leading goaltenders ===
These are the goaltenders that lead the league in GAA that played at least 1,500 minutes.

Note: GP = Games played; Mins = Minutes played; W = Wins; L = Losses; OTL = Overtime losses; SOL = Shootout losses; SO = Shutouts; GAA = Goals against average; Sv% = Save percentage

Player	Team	GP	Mins	W	L	OTL	SOL	SO	GAA	Sv%
Daniel Hauser	Winnipeg Ice	40	2,344	34	3	1	0	8	2.00	0.914
Dylan Garand	Kamloops Blazers	45	2,689	34	9	1	0	4	2.16	0.925
Sebastian Cossa	Edmonton Oil Kings	46	2,631	33	9	2	1	6	2.28	0.913
Gage Alexander	Winnipeg Ice	29	1,703	18	7	2	2	2	2.40	0.911
Connor Ungar	Red Deer Rebels	34	1,900	21	9	1	0	1	2.43	0.911

== 2022 WHL Playoffs ==
Conference Quarterfinals	Conference Semifinals
E1	Winnipeg	4
E8	Prince Albert	1
E1	Winnipeg	4
E4	Moose Jaw	1
E4	Moose Jaw	4
E5	Saskatoon	1
Eastern
E2	Edmonton	4
E7	Lethbridge	0
E2	Edmonton	4
E3	Red Deer	0
E3	Red Deer	4
E6	Brandon	2
Note: Pairings are re-seeded after the first round.
W1	Everett	2
W8	Vancouver	4
W2	Kamloops	4
W8	Vancouver	2
W4	Seattle	4
W5	Kelowna	1
Western
W2	Kamloops	4
W7	Spokane	0
W3	Portland	3
W4	Seattle	4
W3	Portland	4
W6	Prince George	0

Conference Finals
E1	Winnipeg	1
E2	Edmonton	4
W2	Kamloops	3
W4	Seattle	4

WHL Championship
E2	Edmonton	4
W4	Seattle	2

== Conference Quarter-finals ==
=== Eastern Conference ===
==== (E1) Winnipeg Ice vs. (E8) Prince Albert Raiders ====
April 22	Prince Albert Raiders	1–3	Winnipeg Ice	Wayne Fleming Arena	Recap
No scoring		First period	12:03 - Jakin Smallwood (1)
No scoring		Second period	9:34 - pp - Owen Pederson (1)
Reece Vitelli (1) - 1:45		Third period	2:53 - pp - Connor McClennon (1)
Tikhon Chaika (27 saves / 30 shots)		Goalie stats	Daniel Hauser (19 saves / 20 shots)

April 23	Prince Albert Raiders	2–5	Winnipeg Ice	Wayne Fleming Arena	Recap
Landon Kosior (1) - 18:31		First period	2:51 - pp - Nolan Orzeck (1); 11:57 - Jakin Smallwood (2); 19:56 - pp - Owen Pederson (2)
No scoring		Second period	2:10 - Zach Benson (1); 3:20 - Conor Geekie (1)
Reece Vitelli (2) - 15:38		Third period	No scoring
Tikhon Chaika (11 saves / 15 shots); Max Hildebrand (13 saves / 14 shots)		Goalie stats	Daniel Hauser (18 saves / 20 shots)

April 26	Winnipeg Ice	10–1	Prince Albert Raiders	Art Hauser Centre	Recap
Mikey Milne (1) - pp - 3:48; Zach Benson (2) - 7:03; Owen Pederson (3) - 12:07; Mikey Milne (2) - 12:37		First period	No scoring
Zach Benson (3) - pp - 10:30; Connor McClennon (2) - 16:08; Jakin Smallwood (3) - 16:28; Conor Geekie (2) - 17:05; Mikey Milne (3) - sh - 19:35		Second period	No scoring
Skyler Bruce (1) - 8:04		Third period	1:40 - Harrison Lodewyk (1)
Daniel Hauser (18 shots / 19 saves)		Goalie stats	Tikhon Chaika (17 saves / 22 shots); Max Hildebrand (9 saves / 14 shots)

April 27	Winnipeg Ice	1–3	Prince Albert Raiders	Art Hauser Centre	Recap
No scoring		First period	No scoring
No scoring		Second period	1:53 - pp - Remy Aquilon (1)
Mikey Milne (4) - pp - 18:51		Third period	1:06 - Eric Johnston (1); 19:10 - en - Sloan Stanick (1)
Daniel Hauser (20 saves / 22 shots)		Goalie stats	Tikhon Chaika (26 saves / 27 shots)

April 29	Prince Albert Raiders	2–8	Winnipeg Ice	Wayne Fleming Arena	Recap
No scoring		First period	9:58 - Jack Finley (1); 14:18 - Zach Benson (4); 15:18 - Mikey Milne (5); 17:06 - Jonas Woo (1)
Reece Vitelli (3) - sh - 9:46		Second period	1:57 - Connor McClennon (3)
Sloan Stanick (2) - 11:19		Third period	5:48 - Zach Benson (5); 7:26 - Matthew Savoie (1); 8:17 - Connor McClennon (4)
Tikhon Chaika (10 saves / 15 shots); Max Hildebrand (17 saves / 20 shots)		Goalie stats	Daniel Hauser (11 saves / 13 shots)

Winnipeg won series 4–1

==== (E2) Edmonton Oil Kings vs. (E7) Lethbridge Hurricanes ====
April 21	Lethbridge Hurricanes	1–4	Edmonton Oil Kings	Rogers Place	Recap
No scoring		First period	No scoring
No scoring		Second period	9:30 - Carter Souch (1); 14:47 - pp - Dylan Guenther (1)
Brayden Edwards (1) - pp - 18:12		Third period	14:40 - Jalen Luypen (1); 16:33 - en - Luke Prokop (1)
Bryan Thomson (44 saves / 47 shots)		Goalie stats	Sebastian Cossa (25 saves / 26 shots)

April 23	Lethbridge Hurricanes	0–4	Edmonton Oil Kings	Rogers Place	Recap
No scoring		First period	No scoring
No scoring		Second period	6:39 - Carson Golder (1); 18:47 - Carson Golder (2)
No scoring		Third period	14:33 - pp - Dylan Guenther (2); 17:53 - sh - en - Kaiden Guhle (1)
Bryan Thomson (39 saves / 42 shots)		Goalie stats	Sebastian Cossa (25 saves / 25 shots)

April 26	Edmonton Oil Kings	4–1	Lethbridge Hurricanes	Enmax Centre	Recap
Jalen Luypen (2) - 2:21		First period	No scoring
Kaiden Guhle (2) - 1:56; Carter Souch (2) - pp - 11:03		Second period	No scoring
Dylan Guenther (3) - 6:13		Third period	3:18 - pp - Yegor Klavdiev (1)
Sebastian Cossa (25 saves / 26 shots)		Goalie stats	Bryan Thomson (34 saves / 38 shots)

April 28	Edmonton Oil Kings	6–4	Lethbridge Hurricanes	Enmax Centre	Recap
Dylan Guenther (4) - 5:25		First period	1:03 - Alex Thacker (1); 17:47 - Joe Arntsen (1)
Carter Souch (3) - pp - 5:16; Dawson Seitz (1) - 11:19		Second period	13:20 - Tyson Laventure (1)
Tyler Horstmann (1) - 3:58; Josh Williams (1) - pp - 15:57; Jakub Demek (1) - en - 19:50		Third period	15:17 - Justin Hall (1)
Sebastian Cossa (13 saves / 17 shots)		Goalie stats	Bryan Thomson (41 saves / 46 shots)

Edmonton won series 4–0

==== (E3) Red Deer Rebels vs. (E6) Brandon Wheat Kings ====
April 22	Brandon Wheat Kings	0–5	Red Deer Rebels	Peavey Mart Centrium	Recap
No scoring		First period	9:34 - sh - Jace Isley (1)
No scoring		Second period	1:11 - Blake Gustafson (1); 14:58 - Jayden Grubbe (1); 15:55 - Talon Brigley (1)
No scoring		Third period	11:45 - pp - Arshdeep Bains (1)
Ethan Kruger (23 saves / 28 shots)		Goalie stats	Chase Coward (18 saves / 18 shots)

April 23	Brandon Wheat Kings	2–1	OT	Red Deer Rebels	Peavey Mart Centrium	Recap
No scoring		First period		No scoring
Nate Danielson (1) - 17:12		Second period		No scoring
No scoring		Third period		4:30 - Frantisek Formanek (1)
Riley Ginnell (1) - 7:16		First overtime period		No scoring
Ethan Kruger (38 saves / 39 shots)		Goalie stats		Chase Coward (28 saves / 30 shots)

April 26	Red Deer Rebels	3–1	Brandon Wheat Kings	Westoba Place	Recap
No scoring		First period	16:01 - Logen Hammett (1)
Liam Keeler (1) - pp - 18:43		Second period	No scoring
Arshdeep Bains (2) - pp - 6:35; Ben King (1) - 15:26		Third period	No scoring
Ethan Kruger (29 saves / 32 shots)		Goalie stats	Chase Coward (32 saves / 33 shots)

April 27	Red Deer Rebels	1–3	Brandon Wheat Kings	Westoba Place	Recap
Jace Isley (2) - 7:44		First period	13:01 - Trae Johnson (1)
No scoring		Second period	18:24 - pp - Marcus Kallionkieli (1)
No scoring		Third period	19:22 - en - pp - Marcus Kallionkieli (2)
Chase Coward (25 saves / 27 shots)		Goalie stats	Ethan Kruger (26 saves / 27 shots)

April 29	Brandon Wheat Kings	1–3	Red Deer Rebels	Peavey Mart Centrium	Recap
No scoring		First period	0:47 - pp - Kai Uchacz (1); 12:32 - Jhett Larson (1)
No scoring		Second period	No scoring
Vincent Iorio (1) - 6:28		Third period	13:03 - Kai Uchacz (2)
Ethan Kruger (31 saves / 34 shots)		Goalie stats	Chase Coward (27 saves / 28 shots)

May 1	Red Deer Rebels	5–4	3OT	Brandon Wheat Kings	Westoba Place	Recap
Ben King (2) - 0:50; Ben King (3) - 2:52		First period		8:41 - Ridly Greig (1)
Ben King (4) - 10:07; Arshdeep Bains (3) - 15:58		Second period		2:16 - Rylen Roersma (1); 15:11 - pp - Ridly Greig (2)
No scoring		Third period		Marcus Kallionkieli (3) - 2:38
Jayden Grubbe (2) - 7:41		Third overtime period		No scoring
Chase Coward (46 saves / 50 shots)		Goalie stats		Ethan Kruger (50 saves / 55 shots)

Red Deer won series 4–2

==== (E4) Moose Jaw Warriors vs. (E5) Saskatoon Blades ====
April 22	Saskatoon Blades	1–5	Moose Jaw Warriors	Mosaic Place	Recap
No scoring		First period	10:02 - Atley Calvert (1); 14:56 - pp - Jagger Firkus (1)
Josh Pillar (1) - 1:18		Second period	11:21 - Maximus Wanner (1)
No scoring		Third period	4:49 - Majid Kaddoura (1); 8:54 - Ryder Korczak (1)
Nolan Maier (21 saves / 26 shots); Ethan Chadwick (10 saves / 10 shots)		Goalie stats	Carl Tetachuk (18 saves / 19 shots)

April 23	Saskatoon Blades	3–5	Moose Jaw Warriors	Mosaic Place	Recap
No scoring		First period	No scoring
Brandon Lisowsky (1) - 14:20; Vaughn Watterodt (1) - 16:13		Second period	0:20 - sh - Brayden Yager (1); 18:27 - Brayden Yager (2); 19:56 - Lucas Brenton (1)
Brandon Lisowsky (2) - 19:15		Third period	13:14 - Riley Niven (1); 19:39 - en - Calder Anderson (1)
Nolan Maier (33 saves / 37 shots)		Goalie stats	Carl Tetachuk (28 saves / 31 shots)

April 26	Moose Jaw Warriors	3–2	OT	Saskatoon Blades	SaskTel Centre	Recap
Eric Alarie (1) - 18:15		First period		3:20 - pp - Jayden Wiens (1)
Martin Ryšavý (1) - 4:43		Second period		No scoring
No scoring		Third period		19:15 - pp - Brandon Lisowsky (3)
Cordel Larson (1) - 9:40		First overtime period		No scoring
Carl Tetachuk (27 saves / 29 shots)		Goalie stats		Nolan Maier (34 saves / 37 shots)

April 27	Moose Jaw Warriors	3–5	Saskatoon Blades	SaskTel Centre	Recap
No scoring		First period	17:39 - Egor Sidorov (1); 19:50 - Kyle Crnkovic (1)
Maximus Wanner (2) - 10:25; Maximus Wanner (3) - pp - 18:18		Second period	13:45 - Noah Boyko (1)
Ryder Korczak (2) - 2:54		Third period	8:37 - Rhett Rhinehart (1); 19:31 - en - Kyle Crnkovic (2)
Carl Tetachuk (25 saves / 29 shots)		Goalie stats	Nolan Maier (32 saves / 35 shots)

April 29	Saskatoon Blades	3–6	Moose Jaw Warriors	Mosaic Place	Recap
Josh Pillar (2) - pp - 14:02		First period	5:55 - Jagger Firkus (2); 9:08 - pp - Denton Mateychuk (1)
Josh Pillar (3) - 13:00		Second period	8:52 - Jagger Firkus (3)
Trevor Wong (1) - 12:47		Third period	5:26 - Thomas Tien (1); 16:22 - Atley Calvert (2); 18:09 - en - Robert Baco (1)
Nolan Maier (35 saves / 40 shots)		Goalie stats	Carl Tetachuk (26 saves / 29 shots)

Moose Jaw won series 4–1

=== Western Conference ===
==== (W1) Everett Silvertips vs. (W8) Vancouver Giants ====
April 22	Vancouver Giants	5–4	OT	Everett Silvertips	Angel of the Winds Arena	Recap
No scoring		First period		6:24 - Ryan Hofer (1); 19:09 - pp - Alex Swetlikoff (1)
Adam Hall (1) - pp - 3:18; Colton Langkow (1) - 19:02		Second period		6:11 - Jacob Wright (1)
Adam Hall (2) - pp - 6:47; Alex Cotton (1) - 18:40		Third period		2:24 - Niko Huuhtanen (1)
Adam Hall (3) - 9:47		First overtime period		No scoring
Jesper Vikman (34 saves / 38 shots)		Goalie stats		Koen MacInnes (35 saves / 40 shots)

April 23	Vancouver Giants	3–7	Everett Silvertips	Angel of the Winds Arena	Recap
No scoring		First period	1:26 - pp - Niko Huuhtanen (2); 15:09 - Ryan Hofer (2); 17:03 - Jacob Wright (2); 18:39 - Niko Huuhtanen (3)
Ethan Semeniuk (1) - pp - 0:23; Mazden Leslie (1) - 13:25		Second period	8:07 - Olen Zellweger (1)
Jaden Lipinski (1) - pp - 19:40		Third period	3:20 - pp - Michal Gut (1); 7:44 - Ronan Seeley (1)
Will Gurski (38 saves / 45 shots)		Goalie stats	Braden Holt (29 saves / 32 shots)

April 27	Everett Silvertips	6–2	Vancouver Giants	Langley Events Centre	Recap
Ryan Hofer (3) - 9:26; Niko Huuhtanen (4) - 12:57; Ryan Hofer (4) - 19:52		First period	No scoring
Matthew Ng (1) - 2:14; Matthew Ng (2) - 4:00		Second period	3:45 - pp - Fabian Lysell (1); 10:48 - pp - Adam Hall (4)
Niko Huuhtanen (5) - pp - 15:31		Third period	No scoring
Braden Holt (32 saves / 34 shots)		Goalie stats	Jesper Vikman (18 saves / 24 shots)

April 29	Everett Silvertips	6–11	Vancouver Giants	Langley Events Centre	Recap
Jacob Wright (3) - 5:11; Jacob Wright (4) - pp - 8:30; Ryan Hofer (5) - pp - 11:16		First period	3:18 - Adam Hall (5); 16:15 - pp - Zack Ostapchuk (1)
Hunter Campbell (1) - 9:48		Second period	1:03 - Ty Thorpe (1); 5:00 - Alex Cotton (2); 13:32 - pp - Alex Cotton (3); 15:47 - Fabian Lysell (2)
Jacob Wright (5) - 0:12; Olen Zellweger (2) - 2:49		Third period	5:52 - pp - Zack Ostapchuk (2); 6:40 - Colton Langkow (2); 9:27 - Fabian Lysell (3); 14:14 - Evan Toth (1); 19:46 - pp - Kyle Bochek (1)
Braden Holt (9 saves / 13 shots); Koen MacInnes (10 saves / 17 shots)		Goalie stats	Jesper Vikman (24 saves / 30 shots)

April 30	Vancouver Giants	3–0	Everett Silvertips	Angel of the Winds Arena	Recap
Adam Hall (6) - 10:42		First period	No scoring
No scoring		Second period	No scoring
Fabian Lysell (4) - 7:48; Connor Horning (1) - pp - 18:33		Third period	No scoring
Jesper Vikman (50 saves / 50 shots)		Goalie stats	Braden Holt (28 saves / 31 shots)

May 2	Everett Silvertips	3–6	Vancouver Giants	Langley Events Centre	Recap
No scoring		First period	1:15 - pp - Connor Horning (2); 3:15 - Alex Cotton (4); 11:43 - Mazden Leslie (2)
Ben Hemmerling (1) - 12:40		Second period	17:51 - Zack Ostapchuk (3)
Ryan Hofer (6) - pp - 10:00; Jonny Lambos (1) - 18:35		Third period	15:32 - Damian Palmieri (1); 16:52 - Adam Hall (7)
Braden Holt (32 saves / 38 shots)		Goalie stats	Jesper Vikman (22 saves / 25 shots)

Vancouver won series 4–2

==== (W2) Kamloops Blazers vs. (W7) Spokane Chiefs ====
April 22	Spokane Chiefs	0–9	Kamloops Blazers	Sandman Centre	Recap
No scoring		First period	0:44 - Logan Stankoven (1); 7:29 - Drew Englot (1); 7:51 - Matthew Seminoff (1)
No scoring		Second period	0:52 - pp - Logan Stankoven (2); 3:52 - Fraser Minten (1)
No scoring		Third period	1:15 - Luke Toporowski (1); 5:13 - sh - Luke Toporowski (2); 12:17 - Logan Stankoven (3); 13:05 - Caedan Bankier (1)
Mason Beaupit (12 saves / 17 shots); Cooper Michaluk (23 saves / 27 shots)		Goalie stats	Dylan Garand (25 saves / 25 shots)

April 23	Spokane Chiefs	2–6	Kamloops Blazers	Sandman Centre	Recap
No scoring		First period	17:11 - pp - Luke Toporowski (3)
No scoring		Second period	17:22 - Daylan Kuefler (1)
Graham Sward (1) - pp - 9:37; Nick McCarry (1) - 10:54		Third period	1:30 - sh - Fraser Minten (2); 8:25 - Connor Levis (1); 13:59 - pp - Luke Toporowski (4); 14:47 - Matthew Seminoff (2)
Mason Beaupit (21 saves / 22 shots); Cooper Michaluk (10 saves / 15 shots)		Goalie stats	Dylan Garand (21 saves / 23 shots)

April 25	Spokane Chiefs	1–5	Kamloops Blazers	Sandman Centre	Recap
No scoring		First period	Luke Toporowski (5) - 2:55; Fraser Minten (3) - pp - 18:44
14:33 - Erik Atchison (1)		Second period	Logan Stankoven (4) - 3:44; Daylan Kuefler (2) - 16:46
No scoring		Third period	Quinn Schmiemann (1) - pp - 6:44
Cooper Michaluk (34 saves / 39 shots)		Goalie stats	Dylan Garand (25 saves / 26 shots)

April 29	Kamloops Blazers	3–0	Spokane Chiefs	Spokane Arena	Recap
Logan Stankoven (5) - pp - 3:12		First period	No scoring
Logan Stankoven (6) - 18:17		Second period	No scoring
Logan Stankoven (7) - 5:59		Third period	No scoring
Dylan Garand (20 saves / 20 shots)		Goalie stats	Cooper Michaluk (42 saves / 45 shots)

Kamloops won series 4–0

==== (W3) Portland Winterhawks vs. (W6) Prince George Cougars ====
April 22	Prince George Cougars	2–5	Portland Winterhawks	Veterans Memorial Coliseum	Recap
No scoring		First period	1:55 - pp - Aidan Litke (1); 6:02 - James Stefan (1); 8:43 - Cross Hanas (1)
Connor Bowie (1) - 5:51		Second period	17:35 - pp - Gabe Klassen (1)
Riley Heidt (1) - 4:44		Third period	18:19 - en - Jack O'Brien (1)
Ty Young (5 saves / 8 shots); Tyler Brennan (28 saves / 29 shots)		Goalie stats	Taylor Gauthier (32 saves / 34 shots)

April 23	Prince George Cougars	1–2	Portland Winterhawks	Veterans Memorial Coliseum	Recap
No scoring		First period	13:09 - Kurtis Smythe (1)
Jonas Brondberg (1) - 16:29		Second period	13:54 - Luca Cagnoni (1)
No scoring		Third period	No scoring
Tyler Brennan (44 saves / 46 shots)		Goalie stats	Taylor Gauthier (22 saves / 23 shots)

April 26	Portland Winterhawks	2–0	Prince George Cougars	CN Centre	Recap
No scoring		First period	No scoring
Gabe Klassen (2) - 2:46; Gabe Klassen (3) - 13:36		Second period	No scoring
No scoring		Third period	No scoring
Taylor Gauthier (28 saves / 28 shots)		Goalie stats	Tyler Brennan (34 saves / 36 shots)

April 27	Portland Winterhawks	2–1	Prince George Cougars	CN Centre	Recap
James Stefan (2) - 8:22; Luke Schelter (1) - 11:51		First period	No scoring
No scoring		Second period	6:55 - Jonny Hooker (1)
No scoring		Third period	No scoring
Taylor Gauthier (29 saves / 30 shots)		Goalie stats	Tyler Brennan (40 saves / 42 shots)

Portland won series 4–0

==== (W4) Seattle Thunderbirds vs. (W5) Kelowna Rockets ====
April 22	Kelowna Rockets	0–6	Seattle Thunderbirds	accesso ShoWare Center	Recap
No scoring		First period	1:37 - pp - Jared Davidson (1); 7:14 - Sam Oremba (1); 12:03 - pp - Lucas Ciona (1)
No scoring		Second period	9:03 - pp - Matt Rempe (1); 13:43 - Jordan Gustafson (1)
No scoring		Third period	19:51 - pp - Jared Davidson (2)
Talyn Boyko (17 saves / 22 shots); Jari Kykkanen (11 saves / 12 shots)		Goalie stats	Thomas Milic (21 saves / 21 shots)

April 23	Kelowna Rockets	3–7	Seattle Thunderbirds	accesso ShoWare Center	Recap
Adam Kydd (1) - pp - 10:53		First period	6:45 - pp - Henrik Rybinski (1); 11:09 - Lukáš Švejkovský (1)
Mark Liwiski (1) - 10:11		Second period	5:54 - pp - Reid Schaefer (1); 19:26 - Lukáš Švejkovský (2)
Pavel Novak (1) - 8:06		Third period	0:17 - Henrik Rybinski (2); 9:36 - Lukáš Švejkovský (3); 14:53 - pp - Kevin Korchinski (1)
Talyn Boyko (33 saves / 40 shots)		Goalie stats	Thomas Milic (28 saves / 31 shots)

April 26	Seattle Thunderbirds	5–1	Kelowna Rockets	Prospera Place	Recap
No scoring		First period	18:22 - ps - Jake Poole (1)
Reid Schaefer (2) - pp - 5:07		Second period	No scoring
Kevin Korchinski (2) - 5:57; Lukáš Švejkovský (4) - pp - 7:12; Kevin Korchinski (3) - pp - 7:29; Samuel Kňažko (1) - 13:41		Third period	No scoring
Thomas Milic (27 saves / 28 shots)		Goalie stats	Jari Kykkanen (41 saves / 46 shots)

April 27	Seattle Thunderbirds	2–3	OT	Kelowna Rockets	Prospera Place	Recap
Lucas Ciona (2) - 19:41		First period		No scoring
Lucas Ciona (3) - 3:16		Second period		6:28 - pp - Gabriel Szturc (1); 12:45 - Noah Dorey (1)
No scoring		Third period		No scoring
No scoring		First overtime period		15:55 - pp - Adam Kydd (2)
Thomas Milic (26 saves / 29 shots)		Goalie stats		Talyn Boyko (36 saves / 38 shots)

April 29	Kelowna Rockets	3–4	OT	Seattle Thunderbirds	accesso ShoWare Center	Recap
No scoring		First period		No scoring
Max Graham (1) - pp - 5:09		Second period		9:47 - Jared Davidson (3)
Jake Lee (1) - 12:24; 12:34 - Gabriel Szturc (2)		Third period		7:24 - Matt Rempe (2); 10:19 - Jordan Gustafson (2)
No scoring		First overtime period		1:20 - Matt Rempe (3)
Talyn Boyko (40 saves / 44 shots)		Goalie stats		Thomas Milic (18 saves / 21 shots)

Seattle won series 4–1

== Conference Semi-finals ==
=== Eastern Conference ===
==== (E1) Winnipeg Ice vs. (E4) Moose Jaw Warriors ====
May 6	Moose Jaw Warriors	1–6	Winnipeg Ice	Wayne Fleming Arena	Recap
No scoring		First period	0:18 - Connor McClennon (5); 16:50 - pp - Jack Finley (2)
No scoring		Second period	0:57 - Jakin Smallwood (4); 10:11 - pp - Matthew Savoie (2); 14:25 - Owen Pederson (4)
Brayden Yager (3) - 17:48		Third period	0:11 - Mikey Milne (6)
Carl Tetachuk (24 saves / 29 shots); Jackson Unger (5 saves / 6 shots)		Goalie stats	Daniel Hauser (18 saves / 19 shots)

May 7	Moose Jaw Warriors	0–7	Winnipeg Ice	Wayne Fleming Arena	Recap
No scoring		First period	2:49 - Jack Finley (3); 3:35 - Jack Finley (4); 9:01 - pp - Connor McClennon (6)
No scoring		Second period	1:12 - sh - Matthew Savoie (3); 6:07 - pp - Mikey Milne (7); 10:58 - sh - Zach Benson (6)
No scoring		Third period	6:29 - Chase Wheatcroft (1)
Carl Tetachuk (16 saves / 21 shots); Jackson Unger (11 saves / 13 shots)		Goalie stats	Daniel Hauser (27 saves / 27 shots)

May 10	Winnipeg Ice	2–3	Moose Jaw Warriors	Mosaic Place	Recap
3:37 - pp - Zach Benson (7)		First period	No scoring
No scoring		Second period	7:48 - Jagger Firkus (4)
19:00 - Jack Finley (5)		Third period	3:12 - Eric Alarie (2); 9:42 - sh - Calder Anderson (2)
Daniel Hauser (28 saves/31 shots)		Goalie stats	Jackson Unger (38 saves/40 shots)

May 11	Winnipeg Ice	5–3	Moose Jaw Warriors	Mosaic Place	Recap
16:28 - Mikey Milne (8)		First period	19:57 - Jagger Firkus (5)
6:45 - Jack Finley (6); 7:20 - pp - Owen Pederson (5); 13:38 - Matthew Savoie (4)		Second period	13:09 - pp - Jagger Firkus (6)
3:55 - Cole Muir (1)		Third period	11:22 - Majid Kaddoura (2)
Daniel Hauser (30 saves/33 shots)		Goalie stats	Jackson Unger (26 saves/31 shots)

May 13	Moose Jaw Warriors	3–6	Winnipeg Ice	Wayne Fleming Arena	Recap
Ryder Korczak (3) - 0:46; Thomas Tien (2) - 15:52		First period	17:04 - Zach Benson (8)
Atley Calvert (3) - pp - 17:04		Second period	1:39 - Matthew Savoie (5); 11:12 - Cole Muir (2); 15:04 - Conor Geekie (3)
No scoring		Third period	4:03 - Matthew Savoie (6); 18:28 - sh - en - Mikey Milne (9)
Carl Tetachuk (22 saves / 27 shots)		Goalie stats	Daniel Hauser (23 saves / 26 shots)

Winnipeg won series 4–1

==== (E2) Edmonton Oil Kings vs. (E3) Red Deer Rebels ====
May 5	Red Deer Rebels	0–4	Edmonton Oil Kings	Rogers Place	Recap
No scoring		First period	10:18 - pp - Dylan Guenther (5)
No scoring		Second period	6:23 - Šimon Kubíček (1); 14:49 - Kaiden Guhle (3); 16:43 - Dawson Seitz (2)
No scoring		Third period	No scoring
Chase Coward (23 saves / 27 shots); Connor Ungar (8 saves / 8 shots)		Goalie stats	Sebastian Cossa (18 saves / 18 shots)

May 7	Red Deer Rebels	0–5	Edmonton Oil Kings	Rogers Place	Recap
No scoring		First period	No scoring
No scoring		Second period	11:45 - Jaxsen Wiebe (1); 17:02 - Dylan Guenther (6)
No scoring		Third period	2:56 - sh - ps - Justin Sourdif (1); 7:10 - pp - Jakub Demek (2); 9:22 - sh - Jaxsen Wiebe (2)
Chase Coward (34 saves / 39 shots); Connor Ungar (3 saves / 3 shots)		Goalie stats	Sebastian Cossa (26 saves / 26 shots)

May 9	Edmonton Oil Kings	5–4	OT	Red Deer Rebels	Peavey Mart Centrium	Recap
Luke Prokop (2) - 1:55		First period		9:44 - pp - Liam Keeler (2)
Dylan Guenther (7) - 6:32; Carter Souch (4) -pp - 15:56		Second period		18:22 - Kalan Lind (1)
Justin Sourdif (2) - sh - 7:38		Third period		12:50 - Arshdeep Bains (4); 13:26 - Jhett Larson (2)
Jake Neighbours (1) - 7:17		First overtime period		No scoring
Sebastian Cossa (18 saves / 22 shots)		Goalie stats		Connor Ungar (47 saves / 52 shots)

May 11	Edmonton Oil Kings	4–2	Red Deer Rebels	Peavey Mart Centrium	Recap
Jalen Luypen (3) - 15:51		First period	No scoring
Dylan Guenther (8) - 0:08; Carter Souch (5) - 0:39; Dylan Guenther (9) - pp - 18:34		Second period	8:20 - Jhett Larson (3)
No scoring		Third period	13:47 - sh - Blake Gustafson (2)
Sebastian Cossa (14 saves / 16 shots)		Goalie stats	Connor Ungar (47 saves / 51 shots)

Edmonton won series 4–0

=== Western Conference ===
==== (W2) Kamloops Blazers vs. (W8) Vancouver Giants ====
May 6	Vancouver Giants	1–3	Kamloops Blazers	Sandman Centre	Recap
No scoring		First period	18:28 - pp - Caedan Bankier (2)
No scoring		Second period	2:43 - Reese Belton (1); 16:29 - Ethan Rowland (1)
7:04 - Adam Hall (8)		Third period	No scoring
Jesper Vikman (35 saves/38 shots)		Goalie stats	Dylan Garand (30 saves/31 shots)

May 7	Vancouver Giants	3–4	Kamloops Blazers	Sandman Centre	Recap
12:49 - Alex Cotton (5); 19:53 - sh - Evan Toth (2)		First period	11:04 - Drew Englot (2)
15:53 - Ethan Semeniuk (2)		Second period	1:21 - Connor Levis (2); 6:41 - Caedan Bankier (3); 14:21 - pp - Daylan Kuefler (3)
No scoring		Third period	No scoring
Jesper Vikman (35 saves/39 shots)		Goalie stats	Dylan Garand (23 saves/26 shots)

May 10	Kamloops Blazers	2–3	Vancouver Giants	Langley Events Centre	Recap
No scoring		First period	11:55 - Justin Lies (1)
9:45 - Fraser Minten (4)		Second period	15:55 - pp - Ty Thorpe (2)
8:38 - pp - Drew Englot (3)		Third period	16:36 - pp - Alex Cotton (6)
Dylan Garand (29 saves/32 shots)		Goalie stats	Jesper Vikman (34 saves/36 shots)

May 12	Kamloops Blazers	4–2	Vancouver Giants	Langley Events Centre	Recap
13:54 - Luke Toporowski (6)		First period	17:42 - Zack Ostapchuk (4)
12:59 - Caedan Bankier (4)		Second period	No scoring
17:23 - pp - Logan Stankoven (8); 19:52 - en - pp - Logan Stankoven (9)		Third period	6:21 - Zack Ostapchuk (5)
Dylan Garand (18 saves/20 shots)		Goalie stats	Jesper Vikman (39 saves/42 shots)

May 13	Vancouver Giants	5–2	Kamloops Blazers	Sandman Centre	Recap
9:09 - Adam Hall (9)		First period	4:27 - Luke Toprowoski (7)
No scoring		Second period	10:43 - Matthew Seminoff (3)
1:33 - Ty Thorpe (3); 2:32 - Zack Ostapchuk (6); 18:22 - en - pp - Adam Hall (10); 18:38 - en - Zack Ostapchuk (7)		Third period	No scoring
Jesper Vikman (35 saves/37 shots)		Goalie stats	Dylan Garand (21 saves/24 shots)

May 15	Kamloops Blazers	6–0	Vancouver Giants	Langley Events Centre	Recap
6:06 - sh - Fraser Minten (5); 10:27 - Luke Toporowski (8)		First period	No scoring
12:03 - Daylan Kuefler (4); 13:07 - pp - Logan Stankoven (10)		Second period	No scoring
1:05 - pp - Luke Toporowski (9); 12:30 - Caedan Bankier (5)		Third period	No scoring
Dylan Garand (24 saves/24 shots)		Goalie stats	Jesper Vikman (30 saves/36 shots)

Kamloops won series 4–2

==== (W3) Portland Winterhawks vs. (W4) Seattle Thunderbirds ====
May 7	Portland Winterhawks	4–2	Seattle Thunderbirds	accesso ShoWare Center	Recap
No scoring		First period	Jared Davidson (4) - 9:28
8:44 - Marcus Nguyen (1); 14:44 - James Stefan (3)		Second period	Matt Rempe (4) - 19:00
16:21 - pp - Clay Hanus (1); 19:48 - en - Robbie Fromm-Delorme (1)		Third period	No scoring
Taylor Gauthier (23 saves / 25 shots)		Goalie stats	Thomas Milic (20 saves / 23 shots)

May 8	Seattle Thunderbirds	1–2	Portland Winterhawks	Veterans Memorial Coliseum	Recap
9:05 - Lucas Ciona (4)		First period	No scoring
No scoring		Second period	11:02 - Tyson Kozak (1)
No scoring		Third period	16:22 - sh - Gabe Klassen (4)
Thomas Milic (29 saves/31 shots)		Goalie stats	Taylor Gauthier (28 saves/29 shots)

May 11	Seattle Thunderbirds	5–0	Portland Winterhawks	Veterans Memorial Coliseum	Recap
6:14 - Jared Davidson (5)		First period	No scoring
5:29 - Lukas Svejkovsky (5)		Second period	No scoring
7:29 - pp - Conner Roulette (1); 17:05 - en - Jared Davidson (6); 17:37 - Lucas Ciona (5)		Third period	No scoring
Thomas Milic (28 saves/28 shots)		Goalie stats	Taylor Gauthier (25 saves/29 shots)

May 13	Portland Winterhawks	5–1	Seattle Thunderbirds	accesso ShoWare Center	Recap
7:09 - Cross Hanas (2); 14:35 - pp - Tyson Kozak (2)		First period	No scoring
11:42 - pp - Cross Hanas (3); 17:44 - pp - Jack O'Brien (2)		Second period	4:56 - pp - Lukas Svejkovsky (6)
19:49 - en - sh - Cross Hanas (4)		Third period	No scoring
Taylor Gauthier (31 saves/32 shots)		Goalie stats	Thomas Milic (17 saves/21 shots)

May 14	Seattle Thunderbirds	3–1	Portland Winterhawks	Veterans Memorial Coliseum	Recap
12:46 - Henrik Rybinski (3)		First period	No scoring
No scoring		Second period	19:15 - Robbie Fromm-Delorme (2)
2:02 - Nico Myatovic (1); 19:52 - en - Reid Schaefer (3)		Third period	No scoring
Thomas Milic (32 saves/33 shots)		Goalie stats	Taylor Gauthier (34 saves/36 shots)

May 16	Portland Winterhawks	1–2	Seattle Thunderbirds	accesso ShoWare Center	Recap
8:29 - pp - Cross Hanas (5)		First period	3:12 - Reid Schaefer (4); 12:51 - pp - Jordan Gustafson (3)
No scoring		Second period	No scoring
No scoring		Third period	No scoring
Taylor Gauthier (34 saves/36 shots)		Goalie stats	Thomas Milic (29 saves/30 shots)

May 17	Seattle Thunderbirds	6–3	Portland Winterhawks	Veterans Memorial Coliseum	Recap
19:05 - sh - Nico Myatovic (2)		First period	No scoring
5:48 - Jeremy Hanzel (1); 7:20 - Jeremy Hanzel (2); 7:59 - Lucas Ciona (6)		Second period	10:03 - pp - Jaydon Dureau (1); 19:09 - pp - Robbie Fromm-Delorme (3)
11:51 - Lukas Svejkovsky (7); 17:22 - en - Reid Schaefer (5)		Third period	14:50 - pp - Robbie Fromm-Delorme (4)
Thomas Milic (33 saves/36 shots)		Goalie stats	Taylor Gauthier (24 saves/29 shots)

Seattle won series 4–3

== Conference Finals ==
=== Eastern Conference ===
==== (E1) Winnipeg Ice vs. (E2) Edmonton Oil Kings ====
May 20	Edmonton Oil Kings	5–4	OT	Winnipeg Ice	Wayne Fleming Arena	Recap
Dylan Guenther (10) - 13:08		First period		8:34 - Mikey Milne (10)
Šimon Kubíček (2) - sh - 0:47; Dylan Guenther (11) - pp - 7:02; Logan Dowhaniuk (1) - 7:30		Second period		No scoring
No scoring		Third period		6:48 - pp - Ben Zloty (1); 9:20 - Ben Zloty (2); 11:24 - pp - Owen Pederson (6)
Tyler Horstmann (2) - 1:07		First overtime period		No scoring
Sebastian Cossa (22 saves / 26 shots)		Goalie stats		Daniel Hauser (17 saves / 21 shots); Gage Alexander (18 saves / 19 shots)

May 21	Edmonton Oil Kings	1–5	Winnipeg Ice	Wayne Fleming Arena	Recap
Logan Dowhaniuk (2) - pp - 18:45		First period	10:08 - Mikey Milne (11)
No scoring		Second period	No scoring
No scoring		Third period	3:15 - pp - Owen Pederson (7); 6:20 - pp - Mikey Milne (12); 18:24 - en - Mikey Milne (13); 19:17 - Maximilian Streule (1)
Sebastian Cossa (18 shots / 22 saves)		Goalie stats	Gage Alexander (35 shots / 36 saves)

May 23	Winnipeg Ice	3–4	OT	Edmonton Oil Kings	Rogers Place	Recap
18:02 - pp - Jack Finley (7)		First period		14:28 - Dylan Guenther (12)
No scoring		Second period		2:12 - Kaiden Guhle (4)
9:00 - Connor McClennon (7); 16:14 - Zach Benson (9)		Third period		18:42 - Jalen Luypen (4)
No scoring		First overtime period		8:03 - Justin Sourdif (3)
Sebastian Cossa (18 saves/21 shots)		Goalie stats		Gage Alexander (51 saves/55 shots)

May 25	Winnipeg Ice	2–4	Edmonton Oil Kings	Rogers Place	Recap
6:12 - pp - Owen Pederson (8)		First period	5:01 - Carter Souch (6); 9:23 - Carter Souch (7)
18:22 - Owen Pederson (9)		Second period	11:47 - Justin Sourdif (4)
No scoring		Third period	11:24 - pp - Dylan Guenther (13)
Gage Alexander (32 saves/36 shots)		Goalie stats	Sebastian Cossa (20 saves/22 shots)

May 27	Winnipeg Ice	1–7	Edmonton Oil Kings	Rogers Place	Recap
No scoring		First period	4:05 - Carter Souch (8); 4:52 - Jake Neighbours (2); 5:00 - Jake Neighbours (3); 10:18 - Kaiden Guhle (5)
No scoring		Second period	6:57 - Carter Souch (9); 17:09 - Kaiden Guhle (6); 19:11 - pp - Jakub Demek (3)
17:20 - Connor McClennon (8)		Third period	No scoring
Gage Alexander (5 saves/9 shots); Daniel Hauser (25 saves/28 shots)		Goalie stats	Sebastian Cossa (19 saves/20 shots)

Edmonton won series 4–1

=== Western Conference ===
==== (W2) Kamloops Blazers vs. (W4) Seattle Thunderbirds ====
May 20	Seattle Thunderbirds	2–5	Kamloops Blazers	Sandman Centre	Recap
8:06 - pp - Matthew Seminoff (4); 17:55 - Matthew Seminoff (5); 18:48 - Logan Stankoven (11)		First period	10:53 - Kevin Korchinski (4)
No scoring		Second period	No scoring
0:57 - pp - Logan Stankoven (12); 18:39 - en - Logan Stankoven (13)		Third period	17:47 - pp - Jared Davidson (7)
Thomas Milic (22 saves/26 shots)		Goalie stats	Dylan Garand (36 saves/38 shots)

May 21	Seattle Thunderbirds	4–1	Kamloops Blazers	Sandman Centre	Recap
6:39 - Lucas Ciona (7)		First period	1:39 - pp - Logan Stankoven (14)
5:32 - Conner Roulette (2)		Second period	No scoring
5:25 - Sam Oremba (2); 17:55 - en - Reid Schaefer (6)		Third period	No scoring
Thomas Milic (40 saves/41 shots)		Goalie stats	Dylan Garand (23 saves/26 shots)

May 24	Kamloops Blazers	6–3	Seattle Thunderbirds	accesso ShoWare Center	Recap
0:27 - Logan Stankoven (15); 11:21 - pp - Daylan Kuefler (5); 11:39 - Logan Stankoven (16)		First period	18:38 - Kevin Korchinski (5)
17:58 - Quinn Schmiemann (2)		Second period	13:25 - Jared Davidson (8)
13:16 - Daylan Kuefler (6); 18:45 - en - Logan Stankoven (17)		Third period	16:13 - pp - Matt Rempe (5)
Dylan Garand (27 saves/30 shots)		Goalie stats	Thomas Milic (23 saves/28 shots)

May 25	Kamloops Blazers	1–2	OT	Seattle Thunderbirds	accesso ShoWare Center	Recap
19:06 - pp - Daylan Kuefler (7)		First period		No scoring
No scoring		Second period		1:55 - pp - Jordan Gustafson (4)
No scoring		Third period		No scoring
No scoring		First overtime period		11:16 - Nico Myatovic (3)
Dylan Garand (37 saves/39 shots)		Goalie stats		Thomas Milic (35 saves/36 shots)

May 27	Seattle Thunderbirds	3–4	OT	Kamloops Blazers	Sandman Centre	Recap
1:51 - Conner Roulette (3)		First period		6:44 - Matthew Seminoff (6)
2:32 - Lukas Svejkovsky (8)		Second period		8:24 - Daylan Kuefler (8)
10:27 - Kevin Korchinski (6)		Third period		4:58 - Connor Levis (3)
No scoring		First overtime period		5:39 - Daylan Kuefler (9)
Thomas Milic (28 saves/32 shots)		Goalie stats		Dylan Garand (34 saves/37 shots)

May 29	Kamloops Blazers	1–2	Seattle Thunderbirds	accesso ShoWare Center	Recap
12:53 - Kobe Verbicky (1)		First period	No scoring
No scoring		Second period	4:42 - Jared Davidson (9)
No scoring		Third period	3:28 - Lukas Svejkovsky (9)
Dylan Garand (32 saves/34 shots)		Goalie stats	Thomas Milic (34 saves/35 shots)

May 31	Seattle Thunderbirds	3–2	Kamloops Blazers	Sandman Centre	Recap
15:47 - pp - Jared Davidson (10)		First period	8:34 - Fraser Minten (6)
2:27 - Jared Davidson (11); 14:56 - Henrik Rybinski (4)		Second period	No scoring
No scoring		Third period	19:53 - Daylan Kuefler (10)
Thomas Milic (33 saves/35 shots)		Goalie stats	Dylan Garand (34 saves/37 shots)

Seattle won series 4–3

== WHL Championship ==
=== (E2) Edmonton Oil Kings vs. (W4) Seattle Thunderbirds ===
June 3	Seattle Thunderbirds	2–1	Edmonton Oil Kings	Rogers Place	Recap
No scoring		First period	No scoring
1:59 - Matt Rempe (6)		Second period	No scoring
8:55 - Conner Roulette (4)		Third period	11:40 - pp - Carter Souch (10)
Thomas Milic (43 saves/44 shots)		Goalie stats	Sebastian Cossa (20 saves/22 shots)

June 5	Seattle Thunderbirds	4–5	Edmonton Oil Kings	Rogers Place	Recap
No scoring		First period	No scoring
3:29 - Matt Rempe (7); 15:12 - pp - Lukas Svejkovsky (10)		Second period	1:35 - Luke Prokop (3); 4:19 - Luke Prokop (4); 13:11 - Carter Souch (11); 17:28 - pp - Justin Sourdif (5)
0:26 - pp - Jared Davidson (10); 2:50 - Lukas Svejkovsky (11)		Third period	8:46 - Brendan Kuny (1)
Thomas Milic (36 saves/41 shots)		Goalie stats	Sebastian Cossa (26 saves/30 shots)

June 7	Edmonton Oil Kings	4–0	Seattle Thunderbirds	accesso ShoWare Center	Recap
No scoring		First period	No scoring
17:02 - Jakub Demek (4)		Second period	No scoring
4:10 - pp - Simon Kubicek (3); 11:47 - Kaiden Guhle (7); 19:19 - en - Carter Souch (12)		Third period	No scoring
Sebastian Cossa (21 saves/21 shots)		Goalie stats	Thomas Milic (33 saves/36 shots)

June 8	Edmonton Oil Kings	3–2	Seattle Thunderbirds	accesso ShoWare Center	Recap
No scoring		First period	16:03 - pp - Lucas Ciona (8)
3:37 - Josh Williams (2); 5:50 - Josh Williams (3)		Second period	12:53 - pp - Jared Davidson (13)
19:56 - Logan Dowhaniuk (3)		Third period	No scoring
Sebastian Cossa (32 saves/34 shots)		Goalie stats	Thomas Milic (20 saves/23 shots)

June 11	Seattle Thunderbirds	3–2	Edmonton Oil Kings	Rogers Place	Recap
No scoring		First period	6:25 - Josh Williams (4)
2:13 - Conner Roulette (5); 8:51 - pp - Matt Rempe (8)		Second period	No scoring
2:21 - Lucas Ciona (9)		Third period	9:14 - Carson Golder (3)
Thomas Milic (28 saves/30 shots)		Goalie stats	Sebastian Cossa (31 saves/34 shots)

June 13	Seattle Thunderbirds	0–2	Edmonton Oil Kings	Rogers Place	Recap
No scoring		First period	7:15 - pp - Jakub Demek (5)
No scoring		Second period	3:44 - Kaiden Guhle (8)
No scoring		Third period	No scoring
Thomas Milic (34 saves/36 shots)		Goalie stats	Sebastian Cossa (27 saves/27 shots)

Edmonton won series 4–2

== Playoff scoring leaders ==
Note: GP = Games played; G = Goals; A = Assists; Pts = Points; PIM = Penalty minutes

Player	Team	GP	G	A	Pts	PIM
Logan Stankoven	Kamloops Blazers	17	17	14	31	8
Jared Davidson	Seattle Thunderbirds	25	13	16	29	10
Lukáš Švejkovský	Seattle Thunderbirds	24	11	17	28	10
Zachary Benson	Winnipeg Ice	15	9	14	23	10
Luke Toporowski	Kamloops Blazers	16	9	14	23	24
Zack Ostapchuk	Vancouver Giants	12	7	16	23	4
Dylan Guenther	Edmonton Oil Kings	16	13	8	21	10
Carter Souch	Edmonton Oil Kings	19	12	9	21	12
Connor McClennon	Winnipeg Ice	15	8	13	21	16
Reid Schaefer	Seattle Thunderbirds	25	6	15	21	32

== Playoff leading goaltenders ==
Note: GP = Games played; Mins = Minutes played; W = Wins; L = Losses; GA = Goals Allowed; SO = Shutouts; SV& = Save percentage; GAA = Goals against average

Player	Team	GP	Mins	W	L	GA	SO	Sv%	GAA
Tyler Brennan	Prince George Cougars	4	226	0	3	7	0	0.954	1.86
Taylor Gauthier	Portland Winterhawks	11	656	7	4	21	1	0.937	1.92
Dylan Garand	Kamloops Blazers	17	1,029	11	6	33	3	0.933	1.92
Sebastian Cossa	Edmonton Oil Kings	19	1,150	16	3	37	5	0.919	1.93
Daniel Hauser	Winnipeg Ice	12	674	8	2	25	1	0.910	2.23

== WHL awards ==
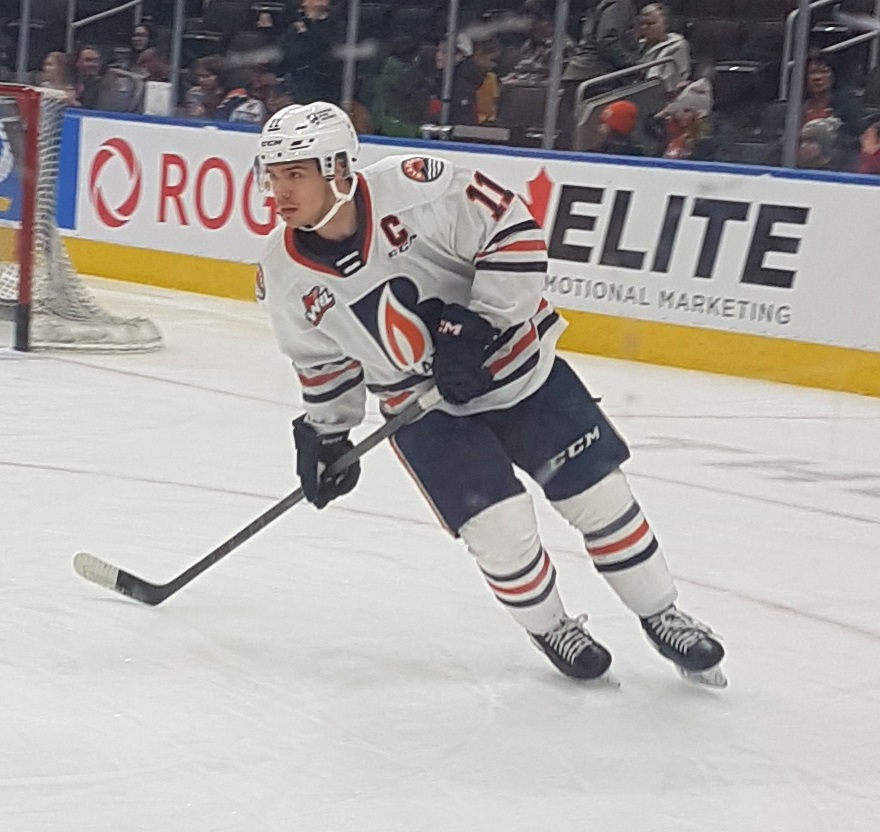
Logan Stankoven was awarded the Four Broncos Memorial Trophy as the league's player of the year, and the Brad Hornung Trophy for most sportsmanlike player.

Scotty Munro Memorial Trophy	Regular season champions	Winnipeg Ice
Four Broncos Memorial Trophy	Player of the Year	Logan Stankoven, Kamloops Blazers
Bob Clarke Trophy	Top Scorer	Arshdeep Bains, Red Deer Rebels
Bill Hunter Memorial Trophy	Top Defenceman	Olen Zellweger, Everett Silvertips
Jim Piggott Memorial Trophy	Rookie of the Year	Brayden Yager, Moose Jaw Warriors
Del Wilson Trophy	Top Goaltender	Dylan Garand, Kamloops Blazers
WHL Plus-Minus Award	Top Plus-Minus Rating	Nolan Orzeck, Winnipeg Ice
Brad Hornung Trophy	Most Sportsmanlike Player	Logan Stankoven, Kamloops Blazers
Daryl K. (Doc) Seaman Trophy	Scholastic Player of the Year	Connor Levis Kamloops Blazers
Jim Donlevy Memorial Trophy	Scholastic team of the Year	Brandon Wheat Kings
Dunc McCallum Memorial Trophy	Coach of the Year	James Patrick, Winnipeg Ice
Lloyd Saunders Memorial Trophy	Executive of the Year	Matt Cockell, Winnipeg Ice
Allen Paradice Memorial Trophy	Top Official	Chris Crich
St. Clair Group Trophy	Marketing/Public Relations Award	Everett Silvertips
Doug Wickenheiser Memorial Trophy	Humanitarian of the Year	Luke Prokop, Edmonton Oil Kings
WHL Playoff MVP	WHL Finals Most Valuable Player	Kaiden Guhle, Edmonton Oil Kings
Professional Hockey Achievement; Academic Recipient	Alumni Achievement Awards	Ryan Getzlaf

=== All-Star teams ===
==== Central Division ====
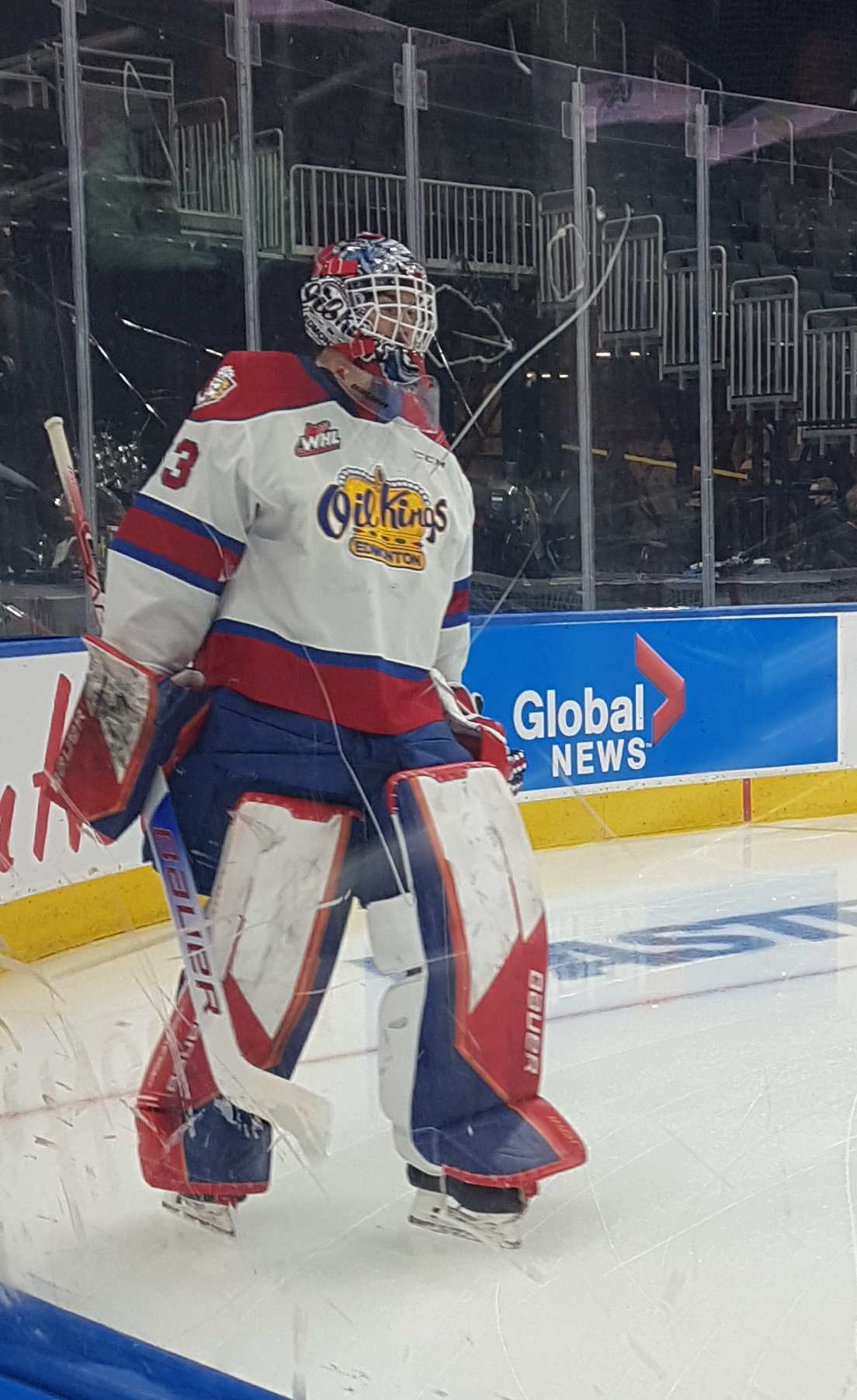
Sebastian Cossa named the First Team goalie for the Central Division.

First Team		Pos.	Second Team	
Player	Team	Pos.	Player	Team
Sebastian Cossa	Edmonton Oil Kings	G	Isaac Poulter	Swift Current Broncos
Kaiden Guhle	Edmonton Oil Kings	D	Simon Kubicek	Edmonton Oil Kings
Christoffer Sedoff	Red Deer Rebels	D	Owen Pickering	Swift Current Broncos
Arshdeep Bains	Red Deer Rebels	F	Riley Fiddler-Schultz	Calgary Hitmen
Dylan Guenther	Edmonton Oil Kings	F	Justin Hall	Lethbridge Hurricanes
Ben King	Red Deer Rebels	F	Jake Neighbours	Edmonton Oil Kings

==== East Division ====
First Team		Pos.	Second Team	
Player	Team	Pos.	Player	Team
Daniel Hauser	Winnipeg Ice	G	Carl Tetachuk	Moose Jaw Warriors
Carson Lambos	Winnipeg Ice	D	Ryker Evans	Regina Pats
Denton Mateychuk	Moose Jaw Warriors	D	Chad Nychuk	Brandon Wheat Kings
Connor Bedard	Regina Pats	F	Ridly Greig	Brandon Wheat Kings
Matthew Savoie	Winnipeg Ice	F	Jagger Firkus	Moose Jaw Warriors
Kyle Crnkovic	Saskatoon Blades	F	Tristen Robins	Saskatoon Blades

==== B.C. Division ====
First Team		Pos.	Second Team	
Player	Team	Pos.	Player	Team
Dylan Garand	Kamloops Blazers	G	Talyn Boyko	Kelowna Rockets
Gannon Laroque	Victoria Royals	D	Ethan Samson	Prince George Cougars
Jake Lee	Kelowna Rockets	D	Quinn Schmiemann	Kamloops Blazers
Colton Dach	Kelowna Rockets	F	Tarun Fizer	Victoria Royals
Bailey Peach	Victoria Royals	F	Pavel Novak	Kelowna Rockets
Logan Stankoven	Kamloops Blazers	F	Luke Toporowski	Kamloops Blazers

==== U.S. Division ====
First Team		Pos.	Second Team	
Player	Team	Pos.	Player	Team
Taylor Gauthier	Portland Winterhawks	G	Thomas Milic	Seattle Thunderbirds
Clay Hanus	Portland Winterhawks	D	Kevin Korchinski	Seattle Thunderbirds
Olen Zellweger	Everett Silvertips	D	Ronan Seeley	Everett Silvertips
Jackson Berezowski	Everett Silvertips	F	Bear Hughes	Spokane Chiefs
Jared Davidson	Seattle Thunderbirds	F	Tyson Kozak	Portland Winterhawks
Cross Hanas	Portland Winterhawks	F	Lukas Svejkovsky	Seattle Thunderbirds

=== Regular season ===
Home team	Home games	Average attendance	Total attendance
Everett Silvertips	34	5,341	181,610
Edmonton Oil Kings	34	5,197	176,724
Calgary Hitmen	34	4,777	162,422
Spokane Chiefs	34	4,418	150,234
Regina Pats	34	3,958	134,588
Kelowna Rockets	34	3,778	128,477
Kamloops Blazers	34	3,471	118,028
Saskatoon Blades	34	3,389	115,253
Portland Winterhawks	34	3,325	113,052
Red Deer Rebels	34	3,307	112,450
Seattle Thunderbirds	34	3,237	110,063
Lethbridge Hurricanes	34	2,983	101,431
Brandon Wheat Kings	34	2,846	96,785
Vancouver Giants	34	2,843	96,666
Victoria Royals	34	2,803	95,303
Tri-City Americans	34	2,696	91,678
Moose Jaw Warriors	34	2,664	90,593
Prince Albert Raiders	34	2,333	79,351
Medicine Hat Tigers	34	2,166	73,656
Prince George Cougars	34	1,914	65,110
Winnipeg Ice	34	1,582	53,812
Swift Current Broncos	34	1,479	50,305
League	748	3,205	2,397,591

== See also ==
- List of WHL seasons
- 2022 Memorial Cup
- 2021–22 OHL season
- 2021–22 QMJHL season

Preceded by 2020–21 WHL season	WHL seasons	Succeeded by 2022–23 WHL season
