= Tyson Kozak =

Canadian ice hockey player (born 2002)

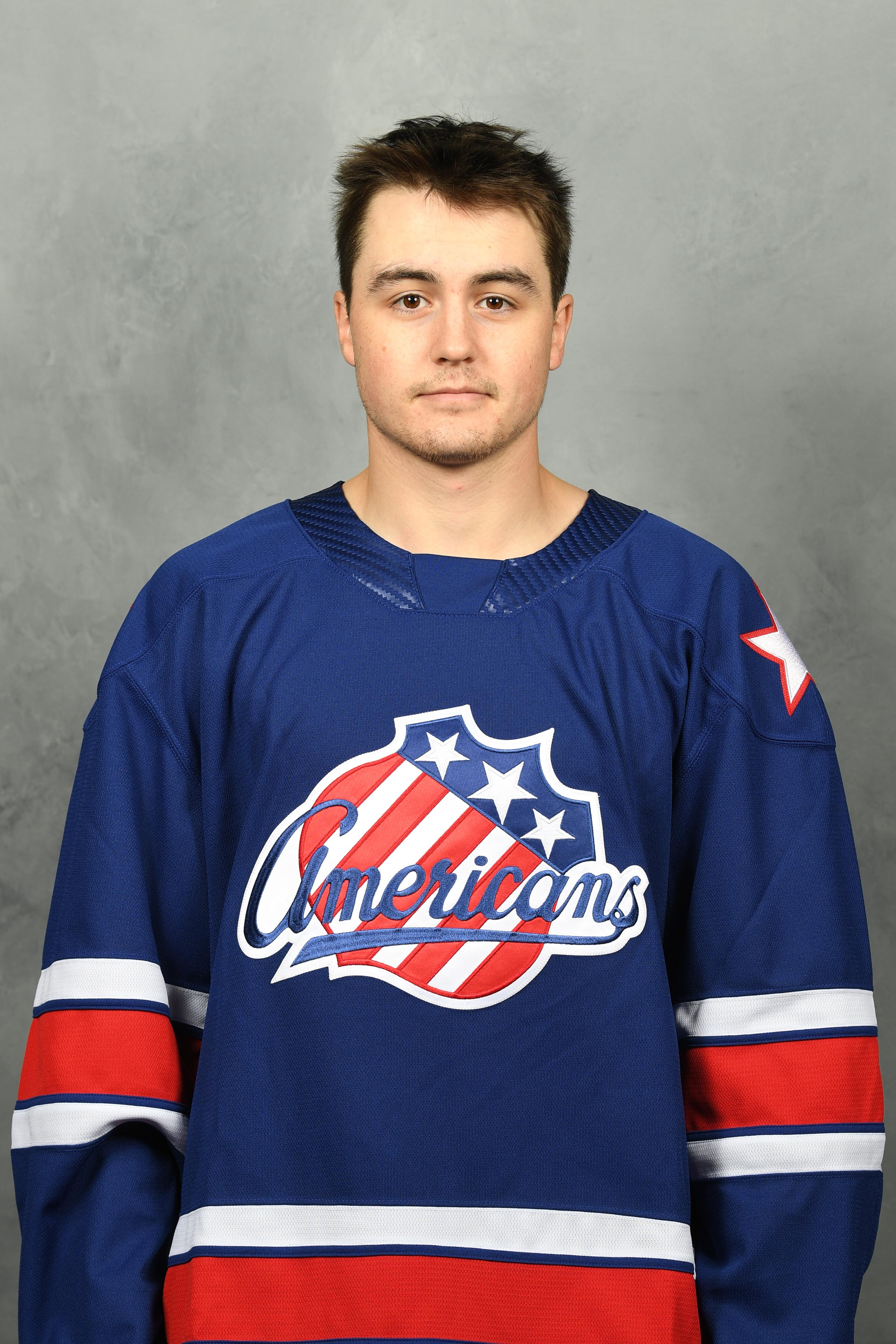
- Kozak in 2023 with the Rochester Americans
- Born: December 29, 2002 (age 23) Souris, Manitoba, Canada
- Height: 5 ft 11 in (180 cm)
- Weight: 185 lb (84 kg; 13 st 3 lb)
- Position: Centre
- Shoots: Left
- NHL team: Buffalo Sabres
- NHL draft: 193rd overall, 2021; Buffalo Sabres
- Playing career: 2022–present

Tyson Kozak (born December 29, 2002) is a Canadian professional ice hockey player who is a centre for the Buffalo Sabres of the National Hockey League (NHL). The Sabres selected him in the seventh round, with the 193rd overall pick, of the 2021 NHL entry draft.

== Early life ==
Kozak was born December 29, 2002, in Souris, Manitoba, to Trevor Kozak and Michelle Kozak. He grew up playing ice hockey and baseball around the Brandon, Manitoba, area. Kozak played minor ice hockey with the Southwest Cougars of the Manitoba U-18 'AAA' Hockey League. During the 2018–19 season, he scored 26 goals and recorded 72 points in 40 games.

== Playing career ==
=== Junior ===
The Portland Winterhawks of the Western Hockey League (WHL) selected Kozak in the sixth round, with the 121st overall pick, of the 2017 WHL bantam draft, and he signed with the team the following August. Kozak played in three junior ice hockey games for Portland during the 2018–19 season before he was reassigned to the Cougars. He made two more appearances with the team that season: once in December as a replacement for Cody Glass, who was participating in the 2019 World Junior Ice Hockey Championships; and again in March as a black ace for the WHL playoffs. He was held pointless in all five regular season and four postseason games.

Kozak joined the Winterhawks in full for the 2019–20 season. He recorded his first junior point on September 21, assisting on Cross Hanas's goal against the Tri-City Americans. Kozak scored his first two goals for the Winterhawks the following week, during Portland's 4–2 victory over the Vancouver Giants on September 27. One of the younger players on the team that season, Kozak credited the Winterhawks' coaching staff for improving his confidence, and through the first 29 games of the season, Kozak posted four goals and 10 points. Playing both centre and wing, Kozak finished his rookie season with 13 goals and 29 points in 63 games, being named the Winterhawks Rookie of the Year.

Ahead of the 2020–21 WHL season, the NHL Central Scouting Bureau named Kozak a C-grade prospect on their preliminary players-to-watch list. The COVID-19 pandemic and its effects on ice hockey limited the Winterhawks to 24 games that year, six of which Kozak missed due to a hip flexor injury early in the season. After failing to record a point through his first five games, he steadily improved throughout the remainder of the shortened season, finishing with three goals and 11 points in 18 games. He also played in one game with the Dauphin Kings of the Manitoba Junior Hockey League while waiting for the WHL season to begin. At the end of the season, the Buffalo Sabres of the National Hockey League (NHL) selected Kozak in the seventh round, with the 193rd overall pick, of the 2021 NHL entry draft.

After attending training camp with the Sabres, Kozak returned to Portland for the 2021–22 season. There, he was named co-captain of the Winterhawks, alongside Clay Hanus. Centering Portland's top line, Kozak overcame a slow start. After recording only one assist in his first eight games, he added 20 goals and 39 points through his next 30 games, setting career highs in goals and points halfway through the season. He attributed his performance to greater confidence, saying that he was "not as worried about making mistakes" as he had been in prior seasons. Kozak finished the season fourth in team scoring, with 32 goals and 69 points in 66 games. At the end of the year, he was named to the WHL U.S. Division Second All-Star Team.

=== Professional ===
The Sabres signed Kozak to a three-year, entry-level contract on August 19, 2022. After training camp, he was assigned to the Rochester Americans, Buffalo's American Hockey League (AHL) affiliate, to begin his professional hockey career. Kozak scored his first professional goal on October 21, against Syracuse Crunch goaltender Maxime Lagacé. Despite missing time with injury, Kozak finished the 2022–23 season with five goals and 10 points in 55 regular season games. Despite his middling points, Kozak received praise from the Americans coaching staff for his physicality and his abilities on the penalty kill. Kozak added another two goals and five points in 14 postseason games during the 2023 Calder Cup playoffs.

Kozak opened the 2023–24 season on the Americans. He spent the entire season in the AHL, struggling to find his rhythm as he battled through injury. These recurring lower-body injuries limited Kozak to only 41 games, during which he posted five goals and 12 points. Kozak was injured again at the Prospects Challenge rookie tournament, causing him to miss all of training camp ahead of the 2024–25 season. When he returned, he found success in Rochester, matching his career high with five goals through his first eight games of the AHL season. After recording six points through 14 games, Kozak was promoted to the Sabres on November 29, 2024, as a replacement for an injured Sam Lafferty. He made his NHL debut on December 5, playing on the fourth line with Beck Malenstyn and Nicolas Aubé-Kubel against the Winnipeg Jets. Kozak appeared to score against Connor Hellebuyck in his debut, but the goal was called back for goaltender interference. Kozak scored his official first goal two days later against the Utah Hockey Club.

The Sabres signed Kozak to a three-year, $2.325 million extension on July 1, 2025.

== Career statistics ==
			Regular season					Playoffs
Season	Team	League	GP	G	A	Pts	PIM	GP	G	A	Pts	PIM
2018–19	Portland Winterhawks	WHL	5	0	0	0	0	4	0	0	0	0
2019–20	Portland Winterhawks	WHL	63	13	16	29	15	—	—	—	—	—
2020–21	Dauphin Kings	MJHL	1	0	0	0	0	—	—	—	—	—
2020–21	Portland Winterhawks	WHL	18	3	8	11	13	—	—	—	—	—
2021–22	Portland Winterhawks	WHL	66	32	37	69	42	10	2	3	5	2
2022–23	Rochester Americans	AHL	55	5	5	10	40	14	2	3	5	2
2023–24	Rochester Americans	AHL	41	5	7	12	14	4	0	0	0	2
2024–25	Rochester Americans	AHL	31	8	6	14	37	8	1	3	4	2
2024–25	Buffalo Sabres	NHL	21	3	2	5	2	—	—	—	—	—
2025–26	Buffalo Sabres	NHL	46	2	4	6	2	6	0	1	1	0
NHL totals			67	5	6	11	4	6	0	1	1	0

== Awards and honours ==
Award	Year(s)
WHL
U.S. Division Second All-Star Team	2022
