= Matt Rempe =

Canadian ice hockey player (born 2002)

Matthew Rempe
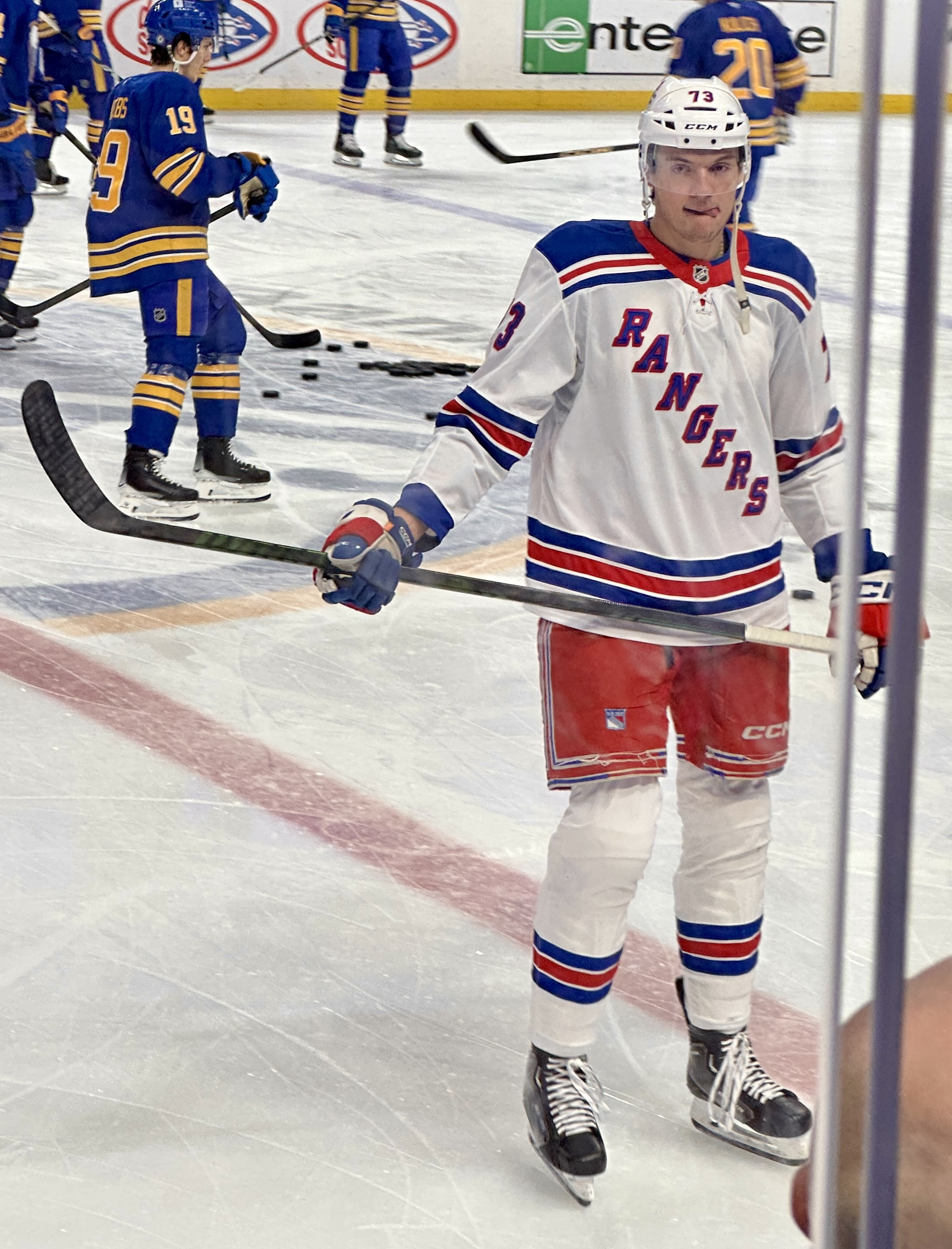
- Rempe with the New York Rangers in 2025
- Born: June 29, 2002 (age 24) Calgary, Alberta, Canada
- Height: 6 ft 9 in (206 cm)
- Weight: 268 lb (122 kg; 19 st 2 lb)
- Position: Centre
- Shoots: Right
- NHL team: New York Rangers
- NHL draft: 165th overall, 2020; New York Rangers
- Playing career: 2022–present

Matthew Rempe (/ˈrɛmpiː/ REM-pee; born June 29, 2002) is a Canadian professional ice hockey player who is a centre for the New York Rangers of the National Hockey League. He was drafted by the Rangers in the sixth round of the 2020 NHL entry draft. Standing 6 ft 9 in (2.06 m) height, Rempe is one of the tallest players ever to play in the NHL.

== Playing career ==
=== Junior ===
Rempe was not drafted in the 2018 WHL Bantam Draft and started his junior career with the Spruce Grove Saints of the Alberta Junior Hockey League (AJHL) after being the final cut in training camp of the Seattle Thunderbirds of the Western Hockey League (WHL). Rempe made the Thunderbirds the following year and despite an injury that forced him to miss the first 15 games of the season, he posted 12 goals and 19 assists for 31 points in 47 games for the 2019–20 season. After the season he was drafted by the New York Rangers in the sixth round of the 2020 NHL entry draft with the 165th overall pick. Upon being drafted, Thunderbirds' general manager Bill LaForge Jr. said:

I think the Rangers got themselves a steal. I thought he had a chance to go significantly earlier than he did. I was really excited, and he has a chance to play for a storied franchise. I sent him a text and said 'the Big Apple just got bigger'. I think we've just scratched the surface with him last year. There's no one with that mixture of tools that he has. He's big, he can skate, and he also has the ability to put the puck in the net.

Thunderbirds' coach Matt O'Dette said "Matt burst onto the scene this year and was an integral part of our team. The work he put in and improvement that followed was eye-popping. To see it culminate into being drafted by the Rangers is fantastic." Rempe himself stated:

This means so much to me and my family. I've gone through a lot but I think it made me stronger. I think it made me more hungry. I can't wait to back to the gym tomorrow. Now I want to prove myself. I just want to go and have an amazing season and pass more people. My goal is to pass people who were taking ahead of me. I want to outwork them. It's a great feeling when you start to have success.

Rempe's 2020–21 season was cut short due to COVID-19 and in 2021–22 he recorded 17 goals and six assists in 56 games for the Thunderbirds.

=== Professional ===
Rempe was invited to the Rangers' training camp prior to the 2021–22 and 2022–23 seasons and during the 2022 camp he showed his physicality by fighting Wade Allison of the Philadelphia Flyers during scrimmages. He said "I don't know how many guys are there from last year, but I bet they'll remember me. I'm just going to go do the same thing I did [last year], play hard and physical and try to score some goals." He joined the Rangers' affiliate, the Hartford Wolf Pack of the American Hockey League (AHL), for the 2022–23 season, where he posted six goals and four assists in 53 games.

He was again invited to the Rangers 2023 training camp, and had fights with Ross Johnston and Scott Mayfield in exhibition games, impressing the Rangers' coaching staff by standing up for his teammates. Rangers' coach Peter Laviolette said:

There's a lot of things that I love about Matt. You saw what he did the other night...Somebody punches one of his teammates in the head and he reacts, and that was a really positive thing for him and what he did for the team. But there's more to it than that. Not all guys that play that type of role can finish check and hit, and he can do that. He's very physical. He's still just a really young kid, but he's an enormous man. And he's only going to get stronger and better.

During the 2023–24 AHL season in Hartford he played both at wing and at centre. After scoring eight goals through February 11, 2024, at Hartford, he was recalled to the Rangers. He was scratched for one game and then returned to Hartford but recalled again a few days later.

Rempe played his first NHL game against the New York Islanders on February 18, as part of the 2024 NHL Stadium Series, making him the first player to start his NHL career with an outdoor game. Before the game when it was uncertain whether Rempe would play, teammate Jimmy Vesey said "That'd be a pretty sick first game. Stadium Series and Rangers–Islanders. We'll see what happens, but if he's in, the only thing I'd probably say is it's probably the coolest NHL debut I've seen so far." It was also the sixth anniversary of his father's death. Just four seconds into his first shift he was involved in a fight with Matt Martin during the faceoff.

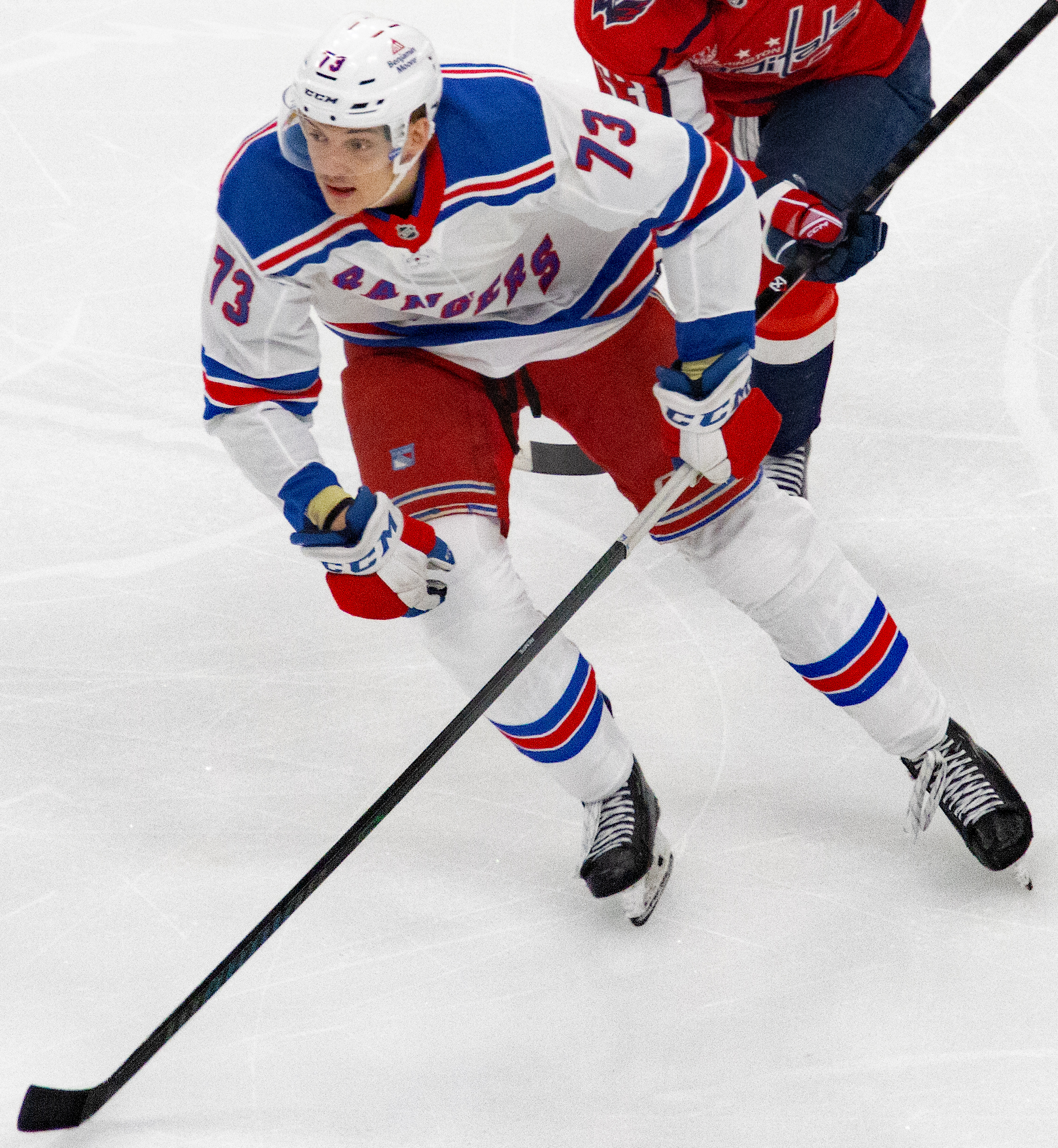
Rempe with the Rangers in 2024

On February 22, in Rempe's third NHL game, he received a match penalty 13 seconds into his first shift for an illegal hit to the head of New Jersey Devils forward Nathan Bastian. Rempe scored his first NHL goal the following game in a 2–1 win over the Philadelphia Flyers. In his fifth NHL game, he recorded his first NHL assist and had his fourth fight. On March 11, Rempe received the second match penalty of his ten-game career for elbowing Devils' defenceman Jonas Siegenthaler, who was injured on the play. Following a league hearing, Rempe was suspended for four games. Rempe had five fights in his first seven games, but then only one more fight the rest of the season. On April 21, he scored a goal in his first NHL playoff game against the Washington Capitals, making him the tenth Rangers rookie to do so since Matt Gilroy accomplished the feat in 2011.

During the 2024–25 season for the Rangers, Rempe was ejected for the fourth time in his career on December 20 with only 22 games played in the NHL. The ejection came as a result of a hit from behind on Dallas Stars defenseman Miro Heiskanen that drove Heiskanen's face and head into the glass. Rempe received a five-minute major penalty for elbowing on the play along with the game misconduct. After a supplementary discipline hearing on December 22, the league suspended Rempe for eight games, the longest such suspension it had imposed since 2018.

Rempe's frequency for fighting other players has led many in the media to label him an enforcer, despite enforcers no longer being common in the NHL.

Rempe was involved in a controversial incident during a game against the Nashville Predators on March 2, 2025, where he delivered a high elbow to defenseman Nick Blankenburg. This led to a fight with Andreas Englund. Despite his prior suspensions for similar offenses, the NHL Department of Player Safety reviewed the play and decided not to impose additional discipline. Rangers head coach Peter Laviolette commented on the incident, acknowledging Rempe's physical style of play but emphasizing the "need to stay within the rules."

On June 18, 2025, the Associated Press reported Rempe signed a two-year, $1.95 million contract extension with the Rangers. Rempe missed most of the 2025-26 season after breaking his thumb in a fight with Ryan Reaves of the San Jose Sharks on 23 October 2025. He missed about 2 months after the injury, and then did return to the Rangers' lineup for 12 games before shutting down because the lingering impact of the injury reduced his effectiveness.

== Personal life ==
Rempe has two older twin sisters, Alley and Stephanie, who both played ice hockey for Brown University. His father, Ron, passed away in 2018.

== Career statistics ==
			Regular season					Playoffs
Season	Team	League	GP	G	A	Pts	PIM	GP	G	A	Pts	PIM
2018–19	Spruce Grove Saints	AJHL	43	4	8	12	32	8	0	1	1	0
2019–20	Seattle Thunderbirds	WHL	47	12	19	31	53	—	—	—	—	—
2020–21	Spruce Grove Saints	AJHL	2	0	0	0	2	—	—	—	—	—
2020–21	Seattle Thunderbirds	WHL	8	1	4	5	12	—	—	—	—	—
2021–22	Seattle Thunderbirds	WHL	56	17	6	23	93	24	8	4	12	10
2022–23	Hartford Wolf Pack	AHL	53	6	4	10	87	—	—	—	—	—
2023–24	Hartford Wolf Pack	AHL	43	8	4	12	96	—	—	—	—	—
2023–24	New York Rangers	NHL	17	1	1	2	71	11	1	0	1	10
2024–25	New York Rangers	NHL	42	3	5	8	67	—	—	—	—	—
2024–25	Hartford Wolf Pack	AHL	18	3	2	5	22	—	—	—	—	—
2025–26	New York Rangers	NHL	26	1	0	1	11	—	—	—	—	—
NHL totals			85	5	6	11	149	11	1	0	1	10
