= Sebastian Cossa =

Canadian ice hockey player (born 2002)

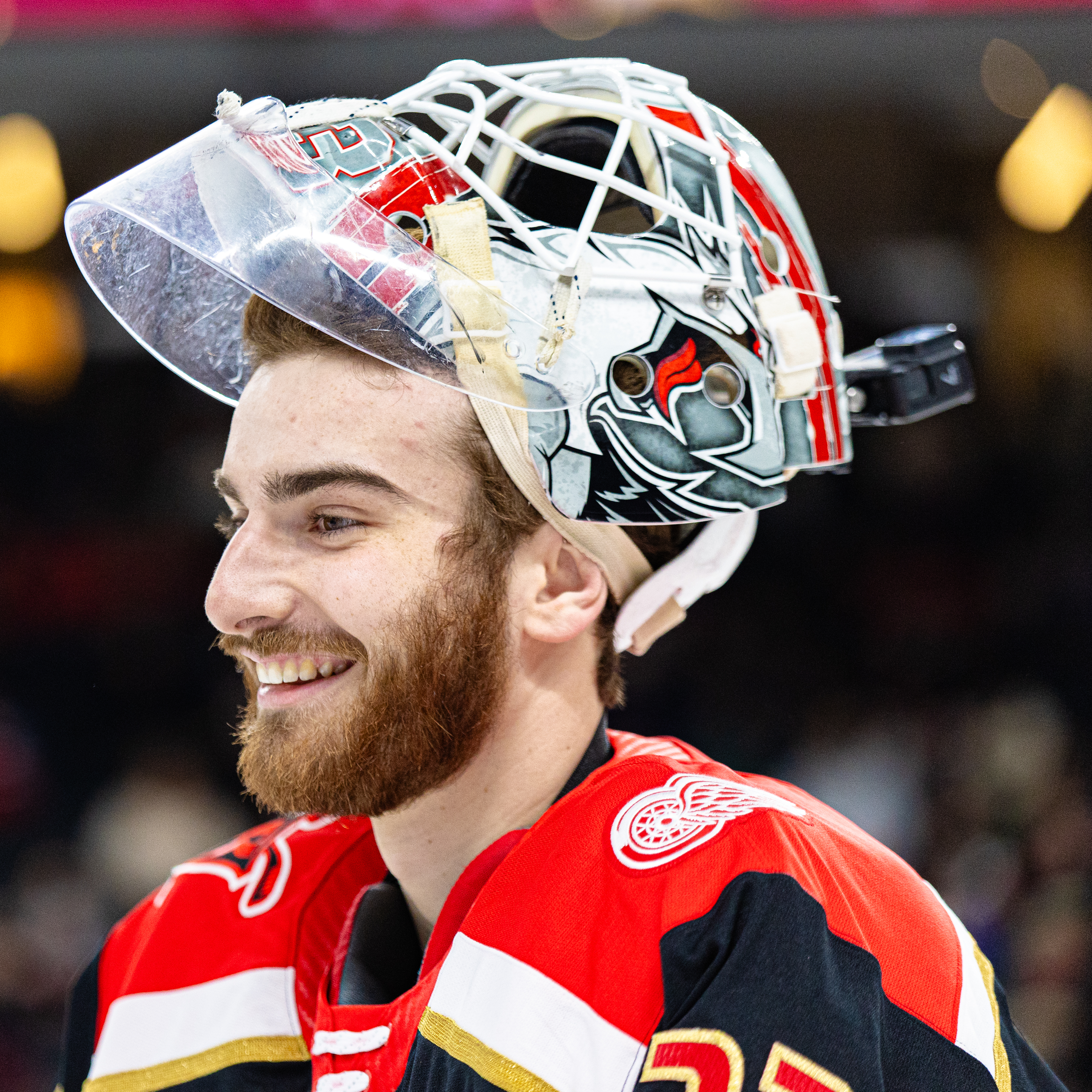
- Cossa with the Grand Rapids Griffins in 2025
- Born: November 21, 2002 (age 23) Hamilton, Ontario, Canada
- Height: 6 ft 6 in (198 cm)
- Weight: 221 lb (100 kg; 15 st 11 lb)
- Position: Goaltender
- Catches: Left
- NHL team Former teams: Utah Mammoth; Detroit Red Wings
- NHL draft: 15th overall, 2021; Detroit Red Wings
- Playing career: 2022–present

Sebastian Cossa (born November 21, 2002) is a Canadian professional ice hockey player who is a goaltender under contract to the Utah Mammoth of the National Hockey League (NHL). He was drafted 15th overall by the Red Wings in the 2021 NHL entry draft.

== Playing career ==
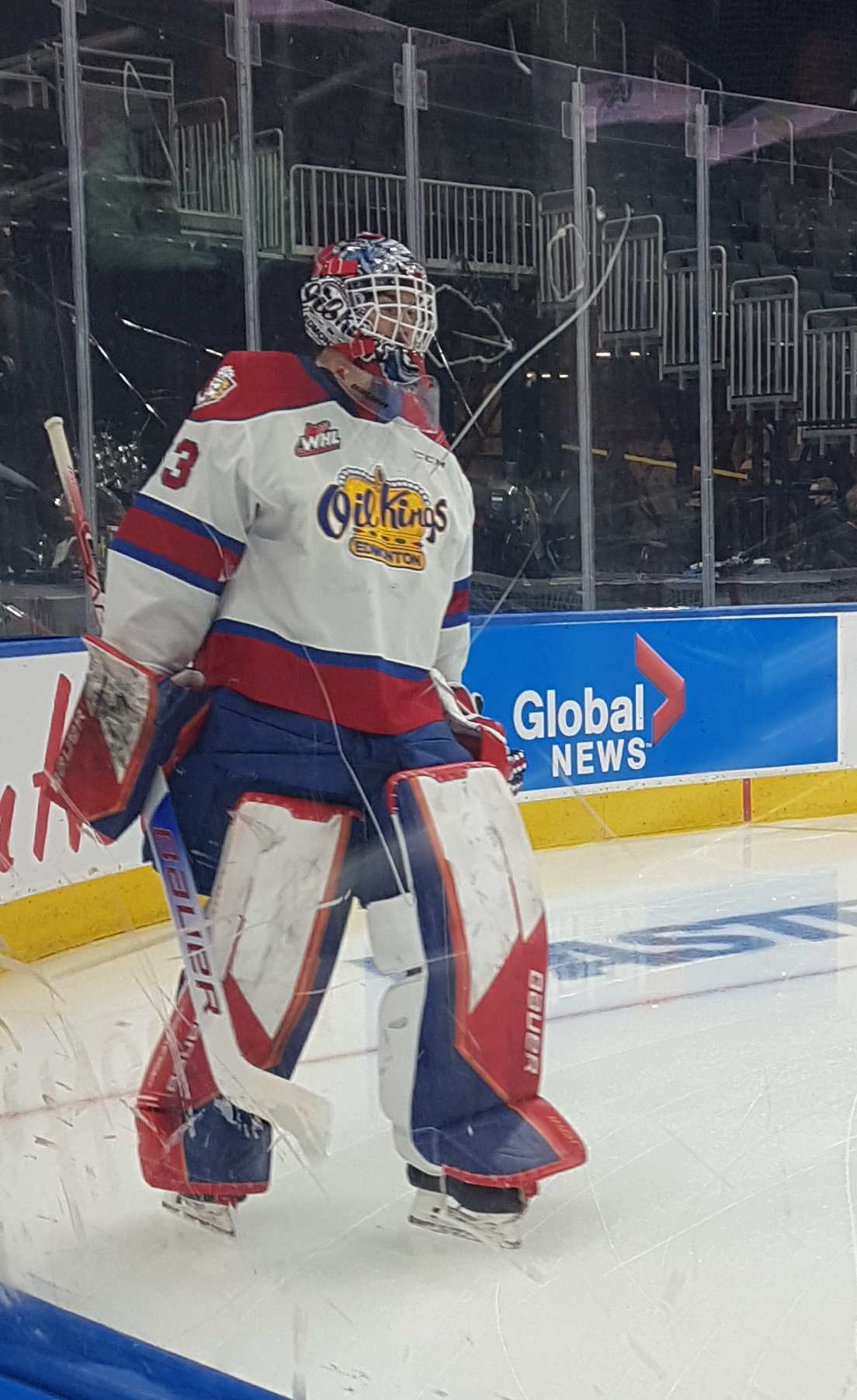
Cossa with the Edmonton Oil Kings in 2022

Cossa was drafted in the 2017 WHL bantam draft in the second round, 36th overall, by the Edmonton Oil Kings. As a rookie during the 2019–20 season, he posted a 21–6–3 record, with a .921 save percentage in 33 starts to finish tied for third-best in the Western Hockey League (WHL) before the season was cancelled due to the COVID-19 pandemic. In December 2019, he posted a 6–1–1–0 record, with a 1.98 goals against average (GAA), and stopped 222 of 238 shots for a 933 save percentage, and was named the WHL Goaltender of the Month.

During the 2020–21 season, he posted a 17–1–1 record. He led the WHL in goals against average (1.57), save percentage (.941) and shutouts (4). By winning his first 12 starts of the year, he set a franchise record for consecutive wins in a single season by a goaltender. In April 2021, he posted a 6–0–0–1 record, with a 1.61 GAA, .936 save percentage and two shutouts, and was named WHL Goaltender of the Month. He was a finalist for the WHL Goaltender of the Year award, and led the Oil Kings to the best record in the league.

On July 23, 2021, Cossa was drafted 15th overall by the Detroit Red Wings in the 2021 NHL entry draft. On August 14, the Red Wings signed Cossa to a three-year, entry-level contract. Cossa was named the WHL Goaltender of the Month for the month of October 2021. He posted a 6–2–1–1 record in 10 games, with a 1.58 GAA, a league-best .943 save percentage, and one shutout.

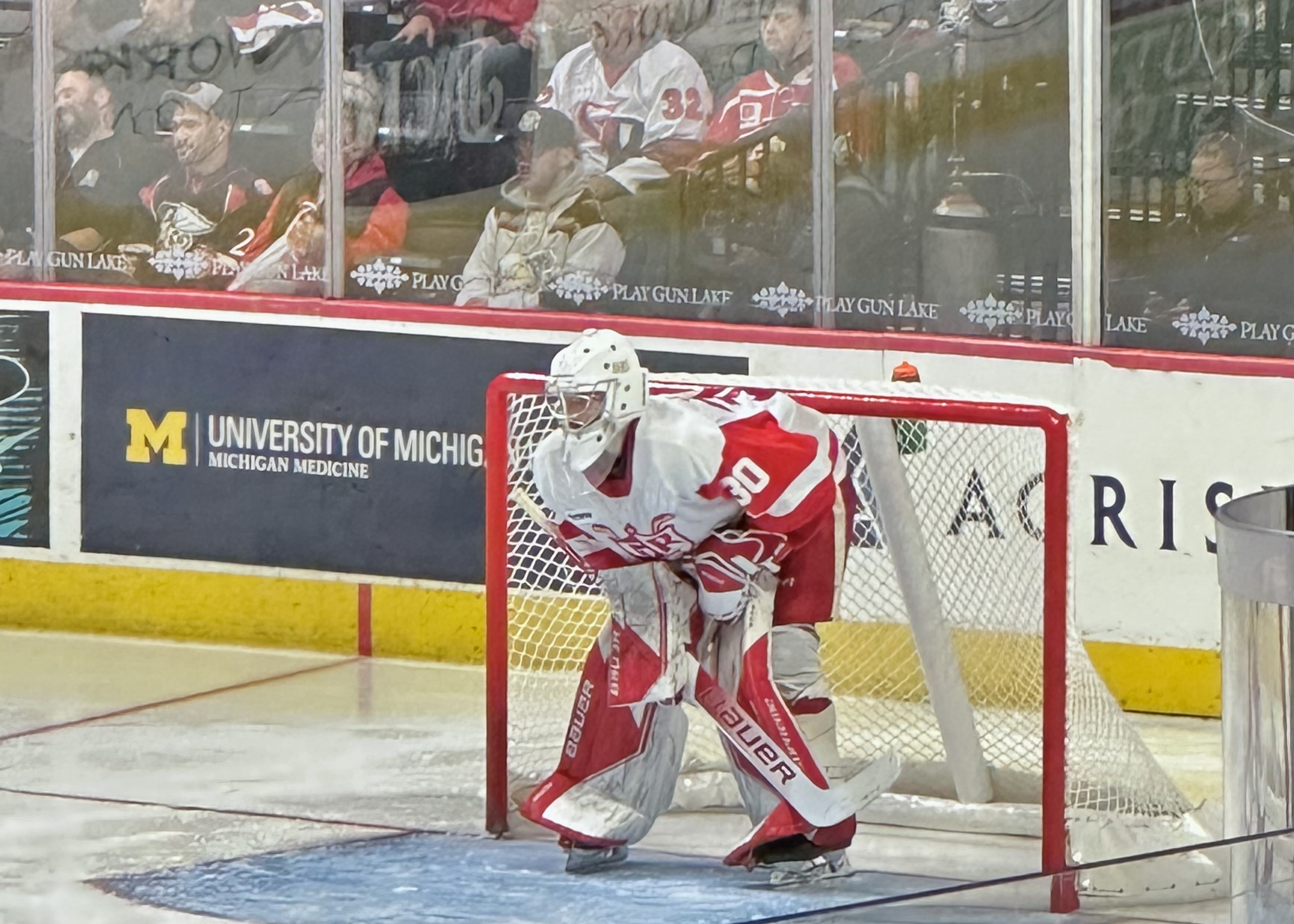
Cossa's professional debut with the Grand Rapids Griffins

Cossa made his professional debut with Detroit's American Hockey League (AHL) affiliate, the Grand Rapids Griffins, on October 19, 2022. He made 21 saves and earned the win in a 3–2 victory over the Milwaukee Admirals. He was reassigned to the Toledo Walleye of the ECHL the next day. On January 21, 2023, Cossa earned his first professional shutout in a 5–0 victory against the Iowa Heartlanders. Along with John Lethemon, Cossa helped lead the Walleye all the way to conference semifinals where they eventually lost to the league's top-seeded Idaho Steelheads 4 games to 1.

During the 2023–24 season, in his first full season in the AHL, he posted a 22–9–9 record with a 2.41 GAA, .913 save percentage and two shutouts in 40 regular season games. During the 2024 Calder Cup playoffs he appeared in nine playoff games, and posted a 5–4 record, with a 2.72 GAA and .900 save percentage, as he helped the Griffins reach the Central Division finals.

On December 2, 2024, Cossa was recalled by the Red Wings under emergency conditions, after placing Alex Lyon on the injured reserve retroactive to November 27, and Cam Talbot suffering a lower-body injury on December 1, in a game against the Vancouver Canucks. He began the 2024–25 season with the Griffins, where he appeared in 14 games and posted a 9–4–1 record, with a 2.21 GAA and .925 save percentage. Cossa subsequently made his NHL debut on December 9, entering in relief of Ville Husso after the first period. He stopped 12 of 14 shots faced en route to a 6–5 shootout victory over the Buffalo Sabres, becoming the 11th goaltender in Red Wings history to earn a win in their NHL debut.

During the 2025–26 season, he posted a 26–8–4 record, with a 2.33 GAA, .915 save percentage and five shutouts in 39 AHL games with the Griffins. He represented the Griffins at the AHL All-Star Game in 2025 and 2026. In four seasons with the Griffins, he appeared in 123 regular season AHL games, and posted a 70–33–19 record, with 2.46 GAA, .911 save percentage, and eight shutouts.

On June 26, 2026, Cossa was traded during the 2026 NHL entry draft to the Utah Mammoth in exchange for the 23rd overall pick. As a pending restricted free agent, Cossa was signed to a two-year, $4 million contract extension on June 30, 2026.

== International play ==
Medal record

Ice hockey

Representing Canada

World Junior Championships
Gold medal – first place	2022 Canada	

On December 1, 2021, Cossa was named to the final roster of Canada for the 2022 World Junior Championships. Serving as backup goaltender to Dylan Garand, he won gold medal with Canada.

== Personal life ==
Cossa was born in Hamilton, Ontario, to Gianni and Sandra Cossa and was raised in Fort McMurray, Alberta. Cossa and his family are survivors of the 2016 Fort McMurray wildfire.

== Career statistics ==
=== Regular season and playoffs ===
			Regular season									Playoffs
Season	Team	League	GP	W	L	OT	MIN	GA	SO	GAA	SV%	GP	W	L	MIN	GA	SO	GAA	SV%
2019–20	Edmonton Oil Kings	WHL	33	21	6	3	1,880	70	4	2.23	.921	—	—	—	—	—	—	—	—
2020–21	Edmonton Oil Kings	WHL	19	17	1	1	1,144	30	4	1.57	.941	—	—	—	—	—	—	—	—
2021–22	Edmonton Oil Kings	WHL	46	33	9	3	2,631	100	6	2.28	.913	19	16	3	1,150	37	5	1.93	.919
2022–23	Grand Rapids Griffins	AHL	3	1	1	0	140	13	0	5.57	.783	—	—	—	—	—	—	—	—
2022–23	Toledo Walleye	ECHL	46	26	16	4	2,667	114	4	2.56	.913	7	5	2	389	15	0	2.32	.917
2023–24	Grand Rapids Griffins	AHL	40	22	9	9	2,389	96	2	2.41	.913	9	5	4	551	25	0	2.72	.900
2024–25	Grand Rapids Griffins	AHL	41	21	15	5	2,425	99	1	2.45	.911	2	0	2	120	9	0	4.51	.868
2024–25	Detroit Red Wings	NHL	1	1	0	0	45	2	0	2.67	.857	—	—	—	—	—	—	—	—
2025–26	Grand Rapids Griffins	AHL	39	26	8	4	2,292	89	5	2.33	.915	—	—	—	—	—	—	—	—
NHL totals			1	1	0	0	45	2	0	2.67	.857	—	—	—	—	—	—	—	—

=== International ===
Year	Team	Event	Result	GP	W	L	OTL	MIN	GA	SO	GAA	SV%
2018	Canada White	U17	6th	2	1	1	0	120	6	0	3.00	.895
2022	Canada	WJC	1st place, gold medalist(s)	1	1	0	0	60	2	0	2.00	.917
Junior totals				3	2	1	0	180	8	0	2.66	.906

== Awards and honours ==
Award	Year	Ref
WHL
Ed Chynoweth Cup champion	2022	
AHL
Harry "Hap" Holmes Memorial Award	2025–26	

Awards and achievements
Preceded by Simon Edvinsson	Detroit Red Wings first-round draft pick 2021	Succeeded by Marco Kasper
