= Kaedan Korczak =

Canadian ice hockey player (born 2001)

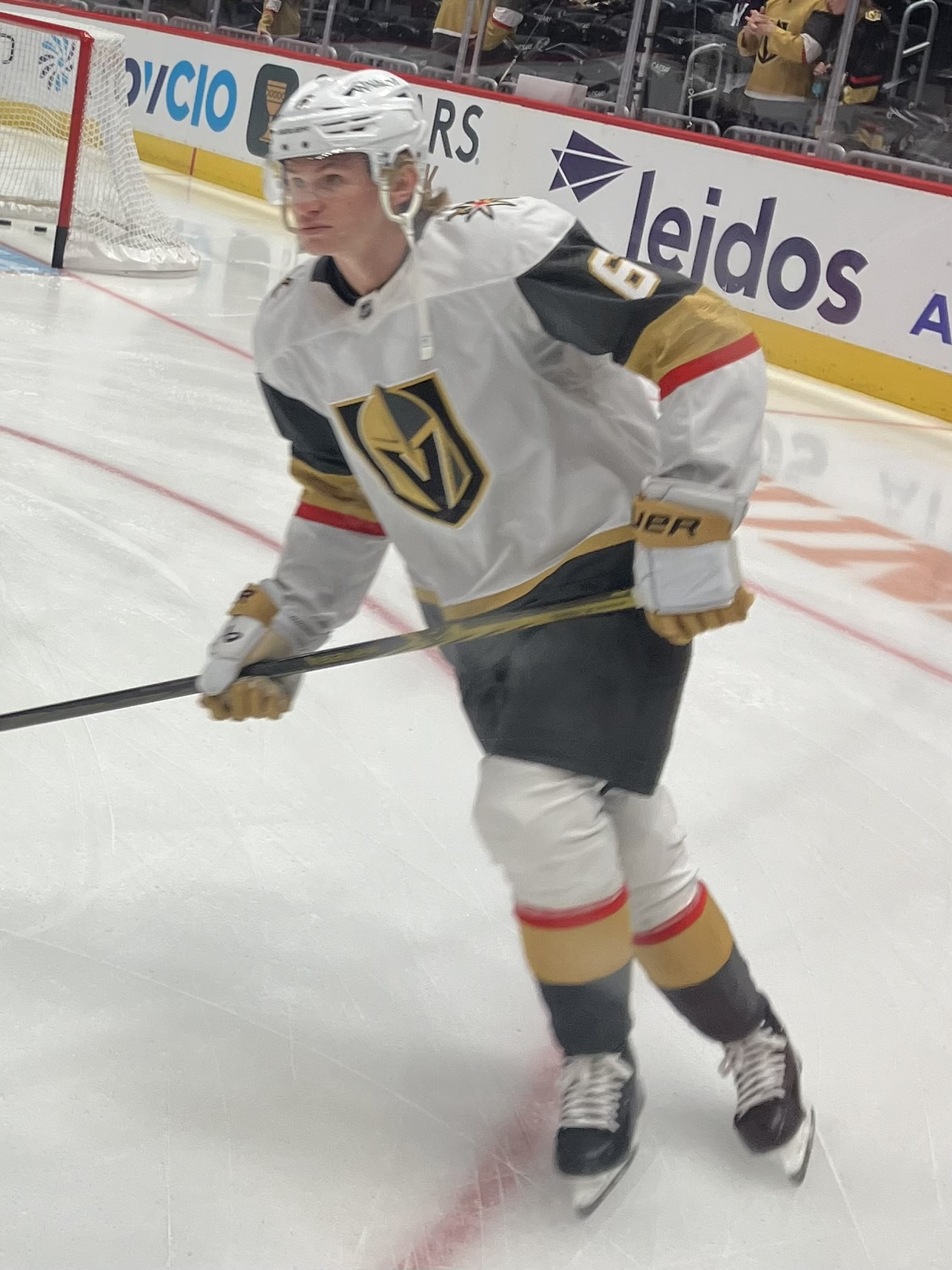
- Korczak with the Vegas Golden Knights in 2024
- Born: January 29, 2001 (age 25) Yorkton, Saskatchewan, Canada
- Height: 6 ft 3 in (191 cm)
- Weight: 206 lb (93 kg; 14 st 10 lb)
- Position: Defence
- Shoots: Right
- NHL team Former teams: Pittsburgh Penguins; Vegas Golden Knights
- NHL draft: 41st overall, 2019; Vegas Golden Knights
- Playing career: 2021–present

Kaedan Korczak (born January 29, 2001) is a Canadian professional ice hockey player who is a defenceman for the Pittsburgh Penguins of the National Hockey League (NHL). He was drafted by the Vegas Golden Knights in the 2019 NHL entry draft after spending four seasons with the Kelowna Rockets of the Western Hockey League (WHL).

Growing up Yorkton, Saskatchewan, Korczak played minor hockey for the Yorkton Terriers and Yorkton Maulers. He spent two years with the Maulers before joining the Rockets from 2017 to 2021. Korczak also represented Canada at the 2018 Hlinka Gretzky Cup and 2021 World Junior Championships.

== Early life ==
Korczak was born on January 29, 2001, in Yorkton, Saskatchewan, Canada, to Chad and Tricia Korczak. His American-born father played NCAA Division I collegiate hockey for the University of Illinois Chicago and Michigan Tech.

== Playing career ==
=== Junior ===
Growing up in Saskatchewan, Korczak played peewee hockey for the Yorkton Terriers in the Saskatchewan AA Hockey League. While with the Yorkton Terriers, Korczak helped lead the team to the 2013 Peewee 'AA' Provincial championships against the Warman Wildcats. He then competed in the Saskatchewan Male U18 AAA Hockey League (SMAAAHL) for the Yorkton Maulers despite still having bantam eligibility. After recording 15 points through 42 games in the 2015–16 season, Korczak was drafted in the first round of the 2016 Western Hockey League (WHL) Bantam Draft by the Kelowna Rockets.

Korczak returned to the Maulers for the 2016–17 season and recorded 29 points over 42 games. He also played four regular-season games for the Rockets as an affiliate player. (Note: WHL’s 15-year-old restrictions only enabled Korczak to play in up to five regular season games, unless his midget team has been eliminated from the playoffs.) He helped the Maulers advance to the second round of the 2017 SMAAAHL playoffs by scoring a hat-trick in Game 4 against the Notre Dame Hounds. At the time, he led the team with three goals and two assists for five points through four games. After the Maulers were eliminated from playoff content, Korczak was again called up to the WHL and played in five playoff games.

Korczak was ranked 32nd among all North American eligible skaters by the NHL Central Scouting Bureau leading up to the 2019 NHL entry draft. He was eventually selected in the second round, 41st overall, by the Vegas Golden Knights. He signed a three-year entry-level contract with Vegas on December 21, 2019, after recording 28 points with the Rockets through 32 games. He finished the season with a career-high 11 goals and 38 assists and received the team's Top Defenceman Award.

=== Professional ===
After participating in the Golden Knights' training camp, Korczak was reassigned to their American Hockey League (AHL) affiliate, the Henderson Silver Knights, for the shortened 2020–21 season. He made his AHL debut on February 12, 2021, against the Bakersfield Condors and recorded his first AHL point the following night, also against the Condors. Korczak was reassigned to the Rockets on March 11, 2021, after playing in nine games for the Silver Knights.

Korczak blocked one shot in 16:37 minutes of ice time in his NHL debut on February 1, 2022, against the Buffalo Sabres.

Korczak recorded his first NHL point, an assist, in his season debut with the Knights on January 2, 2023, against the Colorado Avalanche. While skating alongside Brayden McNabb, he also recorded three shots on net while skating in 15:30 minutes of ice time.

Korczak then scored his first NHL goal on October 18, 2023, against the Dallas Stars. Following the 2023–24 season, Korczak signed a two-year $1.65 million contract extension to remain with Knights on July 2, 2024. Korczak made his Stanley Cup playoff debut on May 6, 2025, playing 13 minutes in a 4–2 loss to the Edmonton Oilers in game 1 of the second round.

On July 2, 2025, Korczak signed a four-year extension with Vegas, keeping him with the team through the 2029–30 season. However, only a year later, on June 30, 2026, Korczak was traded to the Pittsburgh Penguins in exchange for Parker Wotherspoon.

== International play ==
Medal record

Representing Canada

Ice hockey

World Junior Championships
Silver medal – second place	2021 Canada	

Korczak made his international debut with Canada Black at the 2017 World U-17 Hockey Challenge, recording one point in five games. He then appeared for the Canadian under-18 team in the 2018 Hlinka Gretzky Cup and 2019 IIHF World U18 Championships. He won a silver medal with Canada at the 2021 IIHF World Junior Championships.

== Personal life ==
Kaedan's younger brother, Ryder, is also a professional ice hockey player.

== Career statistics ==
=== Regular season and playoffs ===
			Regular season					Playoffs
Season	Team	League	GP	G	A	Pts	PIM	GP	G	A	Pts	PIM
2016–17	Kelowna Rockets	WHL	4	0	0	0	0	5	0	0	0	0
2017–18	Kelowna Rockets	WHL	67	3	13	16	44	4	1	3	4	0
2018–19	Kelowna Rockets	WHL	68	4	29	33	64	—	—	—	—	—
2019–20	Kelowna Rockets	WHL	60	11	38	49	27	—	—	—	—	—
2020–21	Kelowna Rockets	WHL	15	3	5	8	23	—	—	—	—	—
2020–21	Henderson Silver Knights	AHL	11	0	2	2	8	5	1	0	1	0
2021–22	Henderson Silver Knights	AHL	47	2	12	14	28	2	0	0	0	12
2021–22	Vegas Golden Knights	NHL	1	0	0	0	0	—	—	—	—	—
2022–23	Henderson Silver Knights	AHL	50	4	10	14	60	—	—	—	—	—
2022–23	Vegas Golden Knights	NHL	10	0	2	2	0	—	—	—	—	—
2023–24	Vegas Golden Knights	NHL	26	1	8	9	8	—	—	—	—	—
2023–24	Henderson Silver Knights	AHL	26	1	8	9	28	—	—	—	—	—
2024–25	Vegas Golden Knights	NHL	40	0	10	10	2	1	0	0	0	0
2025–26	Vegas Golden Knights	NHL	78	3	13	16	26	13	0	3	3	0
NHL totals			155	4	33	37	36	14	0	3	3	0

=== International ===
Year	Team	Event	Result	GP	G	A	Pts	PIM
2017	Canada Black	U17	7th	5	0	1	1	2
2018	Canada	HG18	1st place, gold medalist(s)	5	0	3	3	8
2019	Canada	U18	4th	7	0	1	1	4
2021	Canada	WJC	2nd place, silver medalist(s)	7	0	1	1	2
Junior totals				24	0	6	6	16
