= Dylan Garand =

Canadian ice hockey player (born 2002)

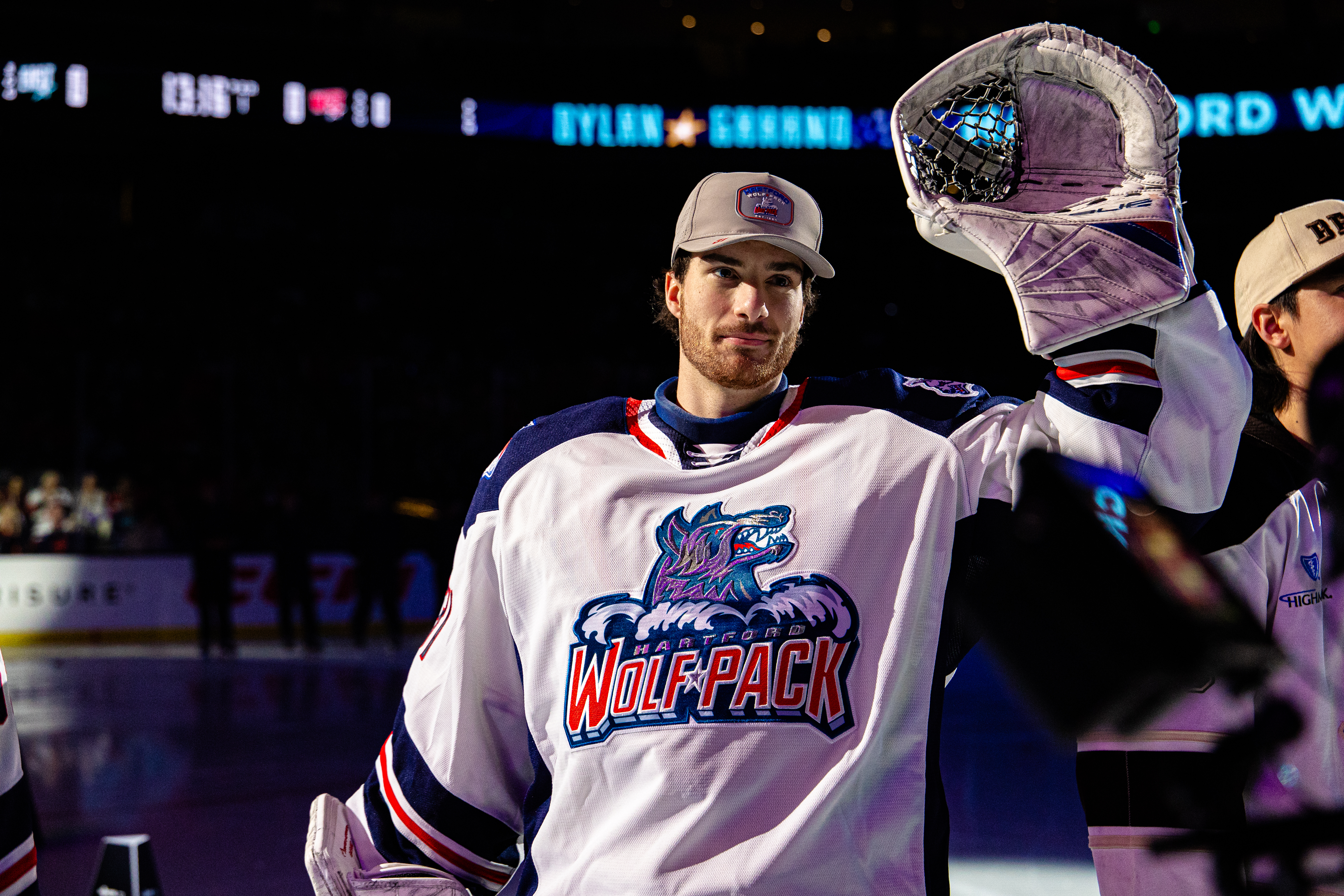
- Garand with the Hartford Wolf Pack in 2025
- Born: June 7, 2002 (age 24) Victoria, British Columbia, Canada
- Height: 6 ft 1 in (185 cm)
- Weight: 181 lb (82 kg; 12 st 13 lb)
- Position: Goaltender
- Catches: Left
- NHL team: New York Rangers
- National team: Canada
- NHL draft: 103rd overall, 2020; New York Rangers
- Playing career: 2021–present

Dylan Garand (born June 7, 2002) is a Canadian professional ice hockey player who is a goaltender for the New York Rangers of the National Hockey League (NHL). He was drafted by the Rangers in the fourth round of the 2020 NHL entry draft.

== Playing career ==
=== Junior ===
Entering the Western Hockey League (WHL), the 2018–19 season was Garand's first full season with the Kamloops Blazers. Although only 16 years old, he became the team's starting goaltender when Dylan Ferguson was injured and Garand led the team to the WHL playoffs.

In the 2018–19 season, Garand played 42 games and had a 2.21 goals against average and a .921 save percentage. He won the Daryl K. Seaman Trophy as WHL's Scholastic Player of the Year. After the season he was drafted by the New York Rangers in the fourth round of the 2020 NHL entry draft with the 103rd overall selection.

For the 2020–21 season, Garand played only 18 games, posting a 2.15 goals against average and a .921 save percentage. Garand also played two games for the Rangers' American Hockey League (AHL) affiliate, the Hartford Wolf Pack. In two games for Hartford he had a 3.68 goals against average and an .839 save percentage.

In the 2021–22 season, Garand posted a 2.16 goals against average and a .925 save percentage for Kamloops. As a result, he won the Del Wilson Trophy as the top WHL goaltender and was named a First Team All-Star in the WHL B.C. Division. His goals against average and saves percentage were each second in the WHL. His 34 wins was tied for first in the league, and he also tied for fourth in the league in shutouts, with four. Garand was considered by some writers to be the best goalie in the entire Canadian Hockey League, and he won the 2021–22 CHL Goaltender of the Year award. Midway through the season Garand signed his first professional contract with the Rangers.

=== Professional ===
He started the 2022–23 pre-season with the Rangers but was assigned to the Hartford Wolf Pack before the season began. He played in 32 games with an .894 save percentage and 3.01 goals against average in the regular season. His stats improved in the playoffs, with a .935 save percentage, 1.76 goals against average and two shutouts in eight games. Rangers' Director of Player Personnel and Amateur Scouting John Lilley said of his 2022–23 season "He had a good season. He grew as a 20-year-old goaltender. It's very, very tough to establish yourself and he had a good year. He got better as it went along. He's on the right path. We're excited about his upcoming year."

Prior to the 2023–24 NHL season, USA Today writer Vincent Z. Mercogliano rated Garand as the Rangers sixth-best prospect. Garand started the 2023–24 season at Hartford but was recalled to the Rangers to serve as their backup goaltender for a game on November 9, 2023, against the Minnesota Wild. He was returned to Hartford after the game. Garand was recalled to the Rangers' playoff roster in May 2024, during Hartford's 2024 Calder Cup playoffs run, after playing seven playoff games for Hartford and leading them to the third round.

Prior to the 2024–25 NHL season, Mercogliano rated Garand as the Rangers' seventh-best prospect and The Hockey News rated him as the Rangers' eighth-best prospect. McKeen's Hockey rated him the Rangers' sixth-best prospect, expressing concern that he showed little improvement in 2023–24 from his rookie season in the AHL, and that he may not be athletic enough to become an effective NHL goalie given his size, but noted his improvement during the 2024 playoffs. He began the season back with Hartford. He was recalled to the Rangers on December 8, to serve as their backup for a game against the Seattle Kraken and was returned to Hartford the following day. He was named the AHL goaltender of the month for December 2024. Garand was selected to play in the 2025 AHL All-Star Classic. He signed a one-year contract extension with the Rangers after the season.

After starting the 2025–26 AHL season with Hartford, he was recalled to the Rangers on November 23, 2025. He returned to Hartford a few days later without getting into a game for the Rangers. He was recalled again on March 20, 2026. Garand made his NHL debut on March 22, against the Winnipeg Jets and made 35 saves on 37 shots as the Rangers lost 3–2 in a shootout. The 35 saves were the third-highest total for a Rangers goaltender in their NHL debut, behind Alexandar Georgiev and Dan Blackburn. Garand recorded his first NHL win on March 27 in his second NHL start, 6–1 against the Chicago Blackhawks.

Garand was sent to Hartford before the start of the 2026–27 NHL season after the Rangers decided to go with the more experienced Joonas Korpisalo as the backup goaltender to Igor Shesterkin. However, he was recalled to the Rangers after their first game due to an injury to Korpisalo. Garand recorded his first career NHL shutout on October 2 in a 2–0 victory over the Detroit Red Wings. After Shesterkin was also injured, Garand became the Rangers' starting goalie. He won his first three starts of the season; this combined with winning two of three starts in 2025–26 he tied Shesterkin and Cam Talbot with the Rangers' record for fewest starts needed to achieve five wins with six.

== International play ==
Medal record

Men's ice hockey

Representing Canada

World Junior Championships
Gold medal – first place	2022 Canada	
Silver medal – second place	2021 Canada	

Hlinka Gretzky Cup
Silver medal – second place	2019 Slovakia/Czech Republic	

Garand was named to Canada junior team for the 2021 World Junior Championships. He served as the backup goaltender to Devon Levi, playing one game during the tournament as Canada won a silver medal. He rejoined the team for the 2022 World Junior Championships, initially scheduled to be played in December 2021 and January 2022. The tournament was cancelled due to the COVID-19 pandemic after Garand had played only one game. However, the tournament resumed in August 2022, with Garand returning as starting goaltender. He played in six of Canada's seven games, winning all of them with a 1.98 goals against average as Canada won the gold medal.

He was a member of Canada senior team for the 2025 World Championship, starting one game in which he earned a shutout.

== Playing style ==
Garand is considered relatively small for a goaltender at 6 ft 1 in (1.85 m). However, according to Kamloops' goaltender coach Dan De Palma "he moves really well (and) he's an elite tracker of the puck. His head trajectory on the puck is outstanding ... and then from there, when the stress and the chaos ensues, his movement is exceptional, as well." Canada's goaltender coach Jason LaBarbera similarly said that "he's able to make saves with his hands really well, and some guys don't have that ability. Sometimes, even if you're a 6-foot-5 guy and you don't have good hands, you can be exposed." LaBarbera also said that Garand has "got a lot of different aspects to his game. He's very talented in that sense. He's very good at tracking the puck. He stays down on the puck; he doesn't chase it. He gives himself opportunities to make saves with his positioning and his skating ability." Garand has said of his height "at end of the day, you've got to stop the puck. If you can do that, then doesn't matter what your height is." Fellow Ranger prospect and Canada teammate Will Cuylle said of Garand "I've never seen someone so like focused and dialed in before."

Asked before the 2022–23 season what it would take to become a great goaltender for the Rangers, Garand said "I feel like just sticking to my game – I know what works for me, so kind of continue to build that foundation and that stuff at the next level."

In 2023, Hartford coach Steve Smith said of Garand that:

He's a really cerebral kid. He's a hard-working kid. I'm not sure there's another guy in the locker room that preps for games as much as he does, even at a young age. He's fully prepped and ready to go, each and every night. He loves to stay extra, he loves to be on the ice, and we clearly believe in him...His future is very bright.

== Career statistics ==
=== Regular season and playoffs ===
			Regular season									Playoffs
Season	Team	League	GP	W	L	OTL	MIN	GA	SO	GAA	SV%	GP	W	L	MIN	GA	SO	GAA	SV%
2017–18	Kamloops Blazers	WHL	3	1	2	0	153	8	0	3.14	.905	—	—	—	—	—	—	—	—
2018–19	Kamloops Blazers	WHL	27	11	7	3	1,408	69	1	2.94	.902	3	0	2	123	7	0	3.42	.879
2019–20	Kamloops Blazers	WHL	42	28	10	3	2,443	90	4	2.21	.921	—	—	—	—	—	—	—	—
2020–21	Kamloops Blazers	WHL	18	15	3	0	1,086	39	3	2.15	.921	—	—	—	—	—	—	—	—
2020–21	Hartford Wolf Pack	AHL	2	0	1	0	81	5	0	3.68	.839	—	—	—	—	—	—	—	—
2021–22	Kamloops Blazers	WHL	45	34	9	1	2,689	97	4	2.16	.925	17	11	5	1,029	33	3	1.92	.933
2022–23	Hartford Wolf Pack	AHL	32	13	14	3	1,717	86	3	3.01	.894	8	5	3	477	14	2	1.76	.935
2023–24	Hartford Wolf Pack	AHL	39	16	17	5	2,278	115	2	3.03	.898	9	5	4	555	24	0	2.59	.922
2024–25	Hartford Wolf Pack	AHL	39	20	10	8	2,327	106	3	2.73	.913	—	—	—	—	—	—	—	—
2025–26	Hartford Wolf Pack	AHL	36	16	15	2	2,013	95	1	2.83	.896	—	—	—	—	—	—	—	—
2025–26	New York Rangers	NHL	3	2	0	1	185	5	0	1.62	.948	—	—	—	—	—	—	—	—
NHL totals			3	2	0	1	185	5	0	1.62	.948	—	—	—	—	—	—	—	—

=== International ===
Year	Team	Event	Result	GP	W	L	OTL	MIN	GA	SO	GAA	SV%
2018	Canada Red	U17	4th	4	2	1	1	258	10	0	2.33	.930
2019	Canada	HG18	2nd place, silver medalist(s)	2	1	1	0	120	3	1	1.51	.857
2021	Canada	WJC	2nd place, silver medalist(s)	1	0	0	0	20	1	0	3.00	.800
2022	Canada	WJC	1st place, gold medalist(s)	6	6	0	0	364	12	0	1.98	.925
2025	Canada	WC	5th	1	1	0	0	60	0	1	0.00	1.000
Junior totals				13	9	3	1	762	26	1	2.04	.919
Senior totals				1	1	0	0	60	0	1	0.00	1.000
