= Roadrunner (disambiguation) =

Roadrunner is a bird of the genus Geococcyx.

Roadrunner or Road Runner may also refer to:

== Companies ==
- New Mexico Rail Runner Express
- Road Runner Express (disambiguation)
- Roadrunner Markets, a chain of convenience stores in Virginia, North Carolina, South Carolina and Tennessee, United States
- Roadrunner Network, Inc., a visual effects firm based in the Philippines
- Road Runner Railway, former name of Lil' Devil Coaster, a roller coaster at Six Flags Great Adventure in New Jersey
- Road Runner Rollercoaster, a Vekoma Junior Coaster in Australia

== Computing ==
- Road Runner High Speed Online, former name of Time Warner Cable
- Roadrunner (supercomputer), a 2008 supercomputer built by IBM
- MicroOffice RoadRunner, an early laptop from 1983
- RoadRunner (application server), an application server
- Road Runner, a shell for carputers

== Film and TV ==
- Road Runner of Wile E. Coyote and the Road Runner, an animated character based on the bird
- Road Runner, short for The Road Runner Show, animated television series
- "Roadrunners" (The X-Files), television series episode
- Roadrunner: A Film About Anthony Bourdain, 2021 documentary film

== Music ==
- Roadrunner Records, a record label
- The Roadrunners, 1960s R&B band from Liverpool
- Roadrunner (venue), a concert venue in Boston

=== Albums ===
- Road Runner (Junior Walker album), a 1966 album by Junior Walker & The All-Stars
- Roadrunner (Hurriganes album), 1974, with a cover of the Bo Diddley song
- Roadrunners!, a 1990 compilation CD by Eric Burdon and The Animals
- Roadrunner, a 1991 demo record by Cynic
- Roadrunner: New Light, New Machine, a 2021 album by Brockhampton.

Roadrunner, A 2025 album by Tom Meighan.

=== Songs ===
- "Road Runner" (Bo Diddley song), 1960
- "(I'm a) Road Runner", a 1965 song made famous by Junior Walker and the All-Stars
- "Roadrunner" (Jonathan Richman song), 1972
- "Roadrunner", a 2021 song by the hip hop group Migos

== Publications ==
- Valley Roadrunner, a newspaper in Valley Center, California
- Roadrunner (Australian music magazine), published in Adelaide, South Australia between 1978 and 1982
- Roadrunner (magazine), about motorcycle touring

== Sports ==
- Roadrunner, participant of road running
- Roadrunner, nickname of Canadian hockey player Yvan Cournoyer

=== Teams ===
- Cal State Bakersfield Roadrunners, athletic program of California State University, Bakersfield
- Correcaminos Colon, professional basketball team in Panama. (Correcaminos is the Spanish word for Roadrunner)
- Metro State Roadrunners, athletic program of Metropolitan State University of Denver
- Phoenix Roadrunners (disambiguation), name of several ice hockey teams
- SFCC Roadrunners, from the State Fair Community College in Sedalia, Missouri
- Tucson Roadrunners, hockey team
- UTSA Roadrunners, the athletic program of the University of Texas at San Antonio
- Montreal Roadrunners, a defunct roller hockey team in the Roller Hockey International (1995–1997)
- Toronto Roadrunners, a defunct ice hockey team in the American Hockey League (2003–2004)
- Edmonton Road Runners, a defunct ice hockey team in the American Hockey League (2004–2005)
- Santa Fe Roadrunners, a defunct ice hockey team in the North American Hockey League (2004–2007)
- Topeka RoadRunners, a defunct ice hockey team in the North American Hockey League (2007–2018)

== Other uses ==
- Plymouth Road Runner, type of automobile
- Road Runner (video game), 1985 arcade game
- USS Road Runner (AMc-35), United States Navy minesweeper
- Road Runner, Texas, incorporated town in Cooke County
- WHCA Roadrunner, a White House Communications Agency mobile command and control vehicle usually seen in the US presidential motorcade.

== See also ==
- Road racing (disambiguation)
