= Luca Caputi =

Canadian ice hockey player (born 1988)

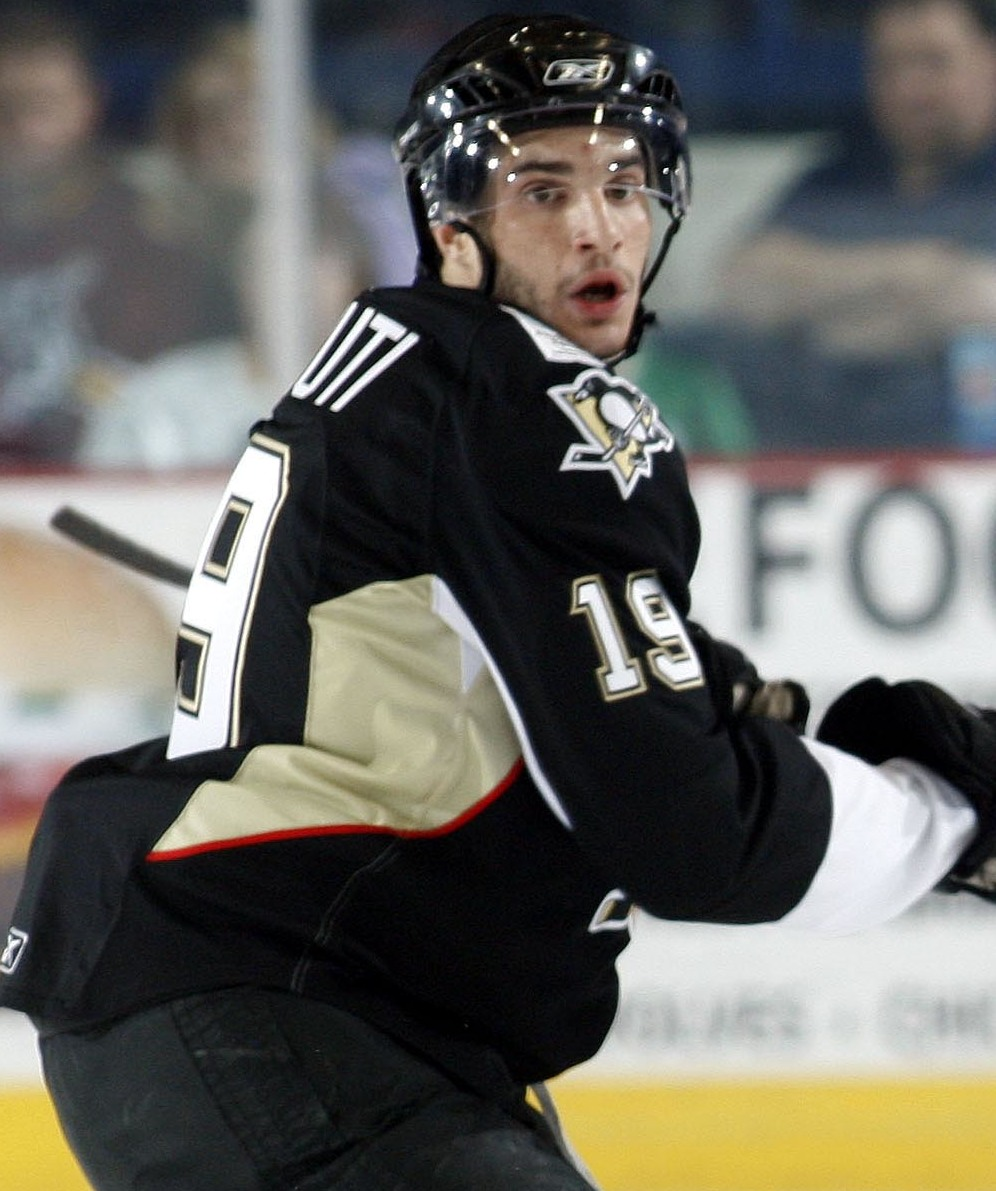
- Caputi with the Wilkes-Barre/Scranton Penguins in 2008
- Born: October 1, 1988 (age 37) Toronto, Ontario, Canada
- Height: 6 ft 3 in (191 cm)
- Weight: 200 lb (91 kg; 14 st 4 lb)
- Position: Left wing
- Shot: Left
- Played for: Pittsburgh Penguins; Toronto Maple Leafs; VIK Västerås HK; IK Oskarshamn
- NHL draft: 111th overall, 2007; Pittsburgh Penguins
- Playing career: 2008–2015

Gianluca Caputi (born October 1, 1988) is a Canadian former professional ice hockey player and former head coach with the Kingston Frontenacs of the Ontario Hockey League. He is currently an amateur scout for the Vancouver Canucks.

== Playing career ==
=== Junior hockey ===
==== Mississauga/Niagara IceDogs (2004–2008) ====
Caputi was drafted by the Mississauga IceDogs of the Ontario Hockey League in the 2nd round, 37th overall, during the 2004 OHL Priority Selection. Caputi played in his first career OHL game on October 8, 2004, as he was held to no points in a 6–4 win over the Barrie Colts. On November 14, Caputi scored his first career OHL goal against Daren Machesney of the Brampton Battalion in a 4–1 loss. Caputi finished his rookie season in 2004–05 playing in 48 games, scoring five goals and an assist and did not play any post-season games with the IceDogs.

Caputi saw little playing time during the 2005–06 season, and in 32 games was held to just three goals as the IceDogs failed to qualify for the post-season.

In 2006–07, Caputi broke out offensively with Mississauga, scoring 27 goals and 65 points in 68 games to finish sixth in team scoring. On September 24, 2006, Caputi earned his first career multi-point OHL game, as he had a goal and an assist in 6-2 win over the Toronto St. Michael's Majors. Less than a month later, on October 15, Caputi scored two goals in a game for the first time in his OHL career, while adding an assist for his first three-point game, in a 9–1 win over the Peterborough Petes. On December 10, Caputi scored a goal and added three assists, earning his first career four-point game, in a 11–5 IceDogs victory over the Oshawa Generals. On March 23, Caputi played in his first career OHL post-season game, as he scored a goal against Sebastian Dahm and added an assist in a 5–4 loss to the Sudbury Wolves. In five playoff games, Caputi had two goals and three points.

During the off-season in 2007, the IceDogs franchise relocated from Mississauga to St. Catharines and were renamed the Niagara IceDogs. Caputi moved with the team and had his best OHL season in 2007–08. On December 2, Caputi earned his first career OHL hat-trick, as he scored three goals in a 5–2 win over the Ottawa 67's. On December 29, Caputi earned another hat-trick, while adding two assists for a career high five points, in a 6–5 overtime win over the Guelph Storm. Caputi finished the season with 51 goals and 111 points in 66 games, finishing fourth in OHL scoring, while setting team records for goals and points in a season. On April 11, Caputi earned his first career playoff hat-trick, scoring three goals in a 8–3 win over the Oshawa Generals. In 10 post-season games, Caputi scored eight goals and 17 points. Following the season, Caputi was named to the OHL Second All-Star Team.

=== Professional career ===
==== Pittsburgh Penguins (2007–2010) ====
Caputi was drafted by the Pittsburgh Penguins in the fourth round, 111th overall, during the 2007 NHL entry draft. On April 23, 2008, Caputi signed a three-year entry-level contract with the club.

In the 2007–08 season, following the elimination of his junior hockey club, the Niagara IceDogs, the Penguins assigned Caputi to their American Hockey League (AHL) affiliate, the Wilkes-Barre/Scranton Penguins for their playoff run. On April 23, Caputi played in his first professional hockey game, as he was held to no points in a 3–2 overtime loss to the Hershey Bears. In his next game on April 25 against the Bears, Caputi scored his first career AHL goal against Frederic Cassivi while adding an assist in a 7–3 victory. On June 7, Caputi scored his first career goal in the Calder Cup finals, as the Penguins defeated the Chicago Wolves 5–1. Overall, in 19 playoff games, Caputi scored four goals and eight points.

Caputi spent the majority of the 2008–09 in the AHL. On January 11, Caputi earned three assists in a 6–2 win over the Hershey Bears for his first career three-point game. In 66 games with Wilkes-Barre/Scranton, Caputi scored 18 goals and 45 points. During the post-season, Caputi scored three goals and eight points in 12 games. Caputi did see some action with Pittsburgh during the 2008–09. On February 3, 2009, Caputi played in his first career NHL game, as he scored 2:30 into the game against Carey Price of the Montreal Canadiens in a 4–2 loss. Overall, in five games with Pittsburgh, Caputi scored one goal. Caputi also appeared in three games with the Wheeling Nailers of the ECHL, scoring two goals and three points.

Caputi once again spent the majority of the 2009–10 in the AHL with Wilkes-Barre/Scranton. In 54 games, he scored 23 goals and 47 points. On February 17, Caputi scored two goals and added two assists for a career-high four points in a 9–2 win over the Albany River Rats. Caputi also suited up for four games with Pittsburgh, as he scored a goal and two points. On March 2, 2010, Pittsburgh traded Caputi and Martin Skoula to the Toronto Maple Leafs for Alexei Ponikarovsky.

==== Toronto Maple Leafs (2009–2012) ====
Caputi joined the Toronto Maple Leafs following a trade on March 2, 2010. On March 4, he appeared in his first game as a member of the Maple Leafs, as he earned an assist in 3–2 shootout loss to the Boston Bruins. Five days later, on March 9, Caputi scored his first career goal with Toronto, scoring against Tim Thomas in a 4–3 win over the Bruins. On March 11, Caputi earned his first career multi-point game in the NHL, as he earned two assists in a 4–3 win over the Tampa Bay Lightning. In 19 games with the Maple Leafs, Caputi had a goal and six points.

Injuries plagued Caputi during the 2010–11 season, as he appeared in only seven games with the Maple Leafs, earning no points. In 13 games with the Toronto Marlies of the AHL during the 2010–11 season, Caputi scored a goal and five points. Caputi scored his first goal with the Marlies on October 16 against Robert Mayer of the Hamilton Bulldogs.

Caputi began the 2011–12 season with the Marlies. In 21 games, he scored two goals and three points. On January 3, 2012, the Maple Leafs traded Caputi to the Anaheim Ducks for Nicolas Deschamps.

==== Anaheim Ducks (2011–2012) ====
The Anaheim Ducks assigned Caputi to their AHL affiliate, the Syracuse Crunch. In his first game with the Crunch on January 3, Caputi faced his former team, the Toronto Marlies. He was held off the scoresheet in a 2–0 loss. On January 13, Caputi scored his first goal with the Crunch against Mike McKenna of the Binghamton Senators in a 5–2 victory. In 39 games with Syracuse in the 2011–12 season, Caputi scored 10 goals and 22 points.

==== Norfolk Admirals (2012–2013) ====
Caputi signed with the Norfolk Admirals of the AHL for the 2012–13 season. In his first game with the Admirals, Caputi had no points in a 3–2 loss to the St. John's IceCaps on October 27. Caputi earned his first points with Norfolk on November 2, as he had two assists in a 4–3 loss to the Binghamton Senators. On November 12, Caputi scored his first goal with the Admirals, scoring against Jeff Frazee of the Albany Devils in a 5–4 shootout victory. In 35 games with Norfolk, Caputi scored three goals and 18 points. Caputi also saw some playing time in the ECHL with the Fort Wayne Komets during the 2012–13 season. In 15 games with Fort Wayne, Caputi scored six goals and 14 points.

==== Västerås IK (2013–2014) ====
Caputi signed with Västerås IK of HockeyAllsvenskan for the 2013–14 season. In 45 games, Caputi scored 14 goals and 35 points to finish second in team scoring.

==== IK Oskarshamn (2014–2015) ====
Caputi joined IK Oskarshamn of HockeyAllsvenskan for the 2014–15 season. In 39 games with the club, Caputi scored 10 goals and 19 points. Following the season, Caputi announced his retirement from hockey.

== Coaching career ==
=== Guelph Storm (2015–2018) ===
Caputi joined the Guelph Storm of the Ontario Hockey League as an assistant coach, working under head coach Bill Stewart, for the 2015–16 season.

The rebuilding Storm struggled in the 2015-16 season, and Stewart resigned as head coach on December 7 after a 2–24–1 record in their first 27 games. After Storm general manager Mike Kelly coached the club for five games as an interim head coach, the team hired Jarrod Skalde as the permanent replacement. Caputi remained as an assistant coach under Skalde, as the Storm finished the season with a 13-49-6 record, earning 32 points, and finishing last in the league.

Caputi returned to the Storm in 2016–17, as the Storm saw some improvement, finishing the season with a 21–40–7 record, earning 49 points, which was a 17-point improvement over the previous season. The team finished in last place in the Western Conference. Following the season, the Storm replaced Skalde as head coach, hiring George Burnett as his replacement. Burnett kept Caputi on his coaching staff as an assistant coach.

Under Burnett, the Storm improved during the 2017–18 season, as the club finished 30–29–9, earning 69 points, and earning a playoff berth. In the post-season, the Storm lost to the Kitchener Rangers in the Western Conference quarter-finals.

Following the season, Caputi stepped down with the Storm, as he was hired as an associate coach with the Kingston Frontenacs.

=== Kingston Frontenacs (2018–2023) ===
On July 16, 2018, Caputi was hired by the Kingston Frontenacs as an associate coach, working with newly-hired head coach Kurtis Foster. The Frontenacs began a rebuilding process in 2018–19, as the club finished to a league-worst 14–52–2 record, earning 30 points, as the club failed to reach the post-season.

Caputi returned to Kingston in the 2019–20 season. The club saw some improvement and finished the season with a 19–39–4 record, earning 42 points. The team was in the eighth and final playoff position in the Eastern Conference, however, the post-season was cancelled due to the COVID-19 pandemic. Following the season, the club dismissed Foster as head coach, and hired Paul McFarland as his replacement as head coach. Caputi remained with the team as an associate coach. Due to the COVID-19 pandemic, the 2019–20 was cancelled. Following the cancellation of the season, McFarland stepped down as head coach.

Following McFarland's departure, the Frontenacs promoted Caputi to the head coaching position for the 2021–22 season. On October 8, 2021, Caputi coached his first game as head coach of the Frontenacs, as Kingston defeated the Ottawa 67's 8–1. In his first season as head coach, Caputi led the Frontenacs to a 41–22–5 record, earning 87 points and third place in the Eastern Conference. In the post-season, the Frontenacs defeated the Oshawa Generals in the Eastern Conference quarter-finals before losing to the North Bay Battalion in the Eastern Conference semi-finals.

The rebuilding Frontenacs struggled in the 2022-23 season, as the club missed the playoffs with a 27-38-3 record, earning 57 points and fifth place in the East Division. Kingston missed the post-season by one point, as they ended their season with 17 losses in their last 20 games.

Caputi began the 2023-24 season with the Frontenacs. On October 23, after the club started the season with a 4-7-0 record, the Frontenacs relieved Caputi of his duties.

== Scouting career ==
In August 2024, Caputi was hired as an amateur scout by the Vancouver Canucks.

== Career statistics ==
			Regular season					Playoffs
Season	Team	League	GP	G	A	Pts	PIM	GP	G	A	Pts	PIM
2003–04	Toronto Jr. Canadiens	GTHL	52	52	55	107	127	—	—	—	—	—
2004–05	Mississauga IceDogs	OHL	48	5	1	6	25	—	—	—	—	—
2005–06	Mississauga IceDogs	OHL	32	3	0	3	43	—	—	—	—	—
2006–07	Mississauga IceDogs	OHL	68	27	38	65	66	5	2	1	3	0
2007–08	Niagara IceDogs	OHL	66	51	60	111	107	10	8	9	17	14
2007–08	Wilkes-Barre/Scranton Penguins	AHL	—	—	—	—	—	19	4	4	8	8
2008–09	Wilkes-Barre/Scranton Penguins	AHL	66	18	27	45	45	12	3	5	8	10
2008–09	Pittsburgh Penguins	NHL	5	1	0	1	4	—	—	—	—	—
2008–09	Wheeling Nailers	ECHL	3	2	1	3	0	—	—	—	—	—
2009–10	Wilkes-Barre/Scranton Penguins	AHL	54	23	24	47	61	—	—	—	—	—
2009–10	Pittsburgh Penguins	NHL	4	1	1	2	2	—	—	—	—	—
2009–10	Toronto Maple Leafs	NHL	19	1	5	6	10	—	—	—	—	—
2010–11	Toronto Marlies	AHL	13	1	4	5	30	—	—	—	—	—
2010–11	Toronto Maple Leafs	NHL	7	0	0	0	4	—	—	—	—	—
2011–12	Toronto Marlies	AHL	21	2	1	3	10	—	—	—	—	—
2011–12	Syracuse Crunch	AHL	39	10	12	22	19	—	—	—	—	—
2012–13	Norfolk Admirals	AHL	35	3	15	18	23	—	—	—	—	—
2012–13	Fort Wayne Komets	ECHL	15	6	8	14	17	—	—	—	—	—
2013–14	VIK Västerås HK	Allsv	45	14	21	35	36	7	0	2	2	6
2014–15	IK Oskarshamn	Allsv	39	10	9	19	36	—	—	—	—	—
NHL totals			35	3	6	9	20	—	—	—	—	—

== Coaching record ==
Team	Year	Regular season						Postseason
Team	Year	G	W	L	OTL	Pts	Finish	Result
Kingston Frontenacs	2021–22	68	41	22	5	87	2nd in East	Won in conference quarter-finals (4-2 vs. OSH); Lost in conference semi-finals (1-4 vs. NB)
Kingston Frontenacs	2022–23	68	27	38	3	57	5th in East	Did not qualify.
Kingston Frontenacs	2023–24	11	4	7	0	8	4th in East	Fired.
OHL totals	2021-24	147	72	67	8	152		5-6 (0.455)
