= Ben McCartney =

Canadian ice hockey player (born 2001)

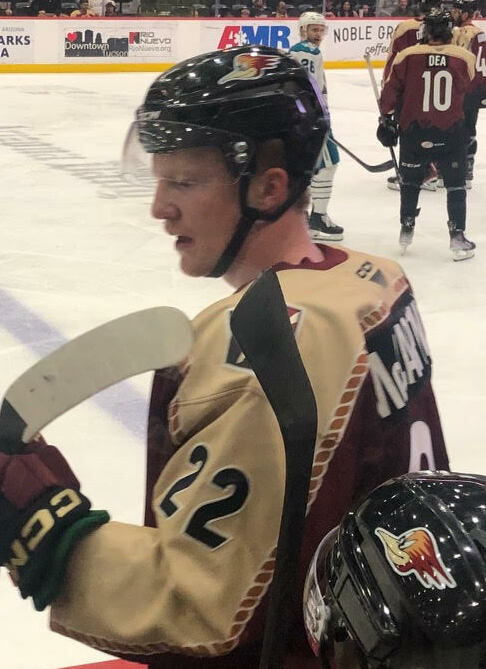
- McCartney with the Tucson Roadrunners in 2023
- Born: July 13, 2001 (age 25) Macdonald, Manitoba, Canada
- Height: 6 ft 0 in (183 cm)
- Weight: 182 lb (83 kg; 13 st 0 lb)
- Position: Forward
- Shoots: Left
- NHL team (P) Cur. team Former teams: Utah Mammoth; Tucson Roadrunners (AHL); Arizona Coyotes
- NHL draft: 204th overall, 2020; Arizona Coyotes
- Playing career: 2021–present

Ben McCartney (born July 13, 2001) is a Canadian professional ice hockey forward for the Tucson Roadrunners of the American Hockey League (AHL) while under contract to the Utah Mammoth of the National Hockey League (NHL). McCartney was drafted 204th overall by the Arizona Coyotes in the 2020 NHL entry draft and made his NHL debut in 2021.

== Playing career ==
McCartney played major junior hockey in the Western Hockey League (WHL) with the Brandon Wheat Kings. He played in five seasons with the Wheat Kings scoring 60 goals and 151 points in 205 games. He was selected by the Arizona Coyotes of the National Hockey League (NHL) in the seventh round, 204th overall, in the 2020 NHL entry draft. He signed a three-year, entry-level contract with the Coyotes on May 27, 2021. Following the end of his junior year McCartney joined Arizona's American Hockey League (AHL) affiliate, the Tucson Roadrunners for the last four games of the season, making him the youngest player for the team in their history.

During the 2021–22 season, McCartney scored the first of two hat tricks in a 4–0 win over the Texas Stars in the Roadrunners' home opener on October 23, 2021. He was recalled by Arizona in November 2021 and made his NHL debut on November 5 in a 3–1 loss to the Anaheim Ducks. He was returned to Tucson after the game. He scored his second hat trick for Tucson in a 6–5 loss to the Colorado Eagles on April 16, 2022. McCartney finished the season with 18 goals and 35 points in 55 games, second on the team in goals and fifth in scoring. He began the 2022–23 season with Tucson, where he was named an alternate captain. He began the 2023–24 season with Tucson, but was recalled by Arizona on October 28, 2023. He saw no action with Arizona and was returned to Tucson on October 30.

== Career statistics ==
			Regular season					Playoffs
Season	Team	League	GP	G	A	Pts	PIM	GP	G	A	Pts	PIM
2016–17	Brandon Wheat Kings	WHL	2	0	0	0	0	3	1	0	1	2
2017–18	Brandon Wheat Kings	WHL	51	2	10	12	32	11	1	5	6	8
2018–19	Brandon Wheat Kings	WHL	67	21	20	41	72	—	—	—	—	—
2019–20	Brandon Wheat Kings	WHL	61	25	36	61	105	—	—	—	—	—
2020–21	Brandon Wheat Kings	WHL	24	13	24	37	29	—	—	—	—	—
2020–21	Tucson Roadrunners	AHL	4	1	4	5	2	—	—	—	—	—
2021–22	Tucson Roadrunners	AHL	57	18	17	35	60	—	—	—	—	—
2021–22	Arizona Coyotes	NHL	2	0	0	0	4	—	—	—	—	—
2022–23	Tucson Roadrunners	AHL	45	7	8	15	65	3	0	1	1	2
2023–24	Tucson Roadrunners	AHL	46	6	16	22	67	—	—	—	—	—
2024–25	Tucson Roadrunners	AHL	63	16	17	33	86	3	2	1	3	4
2025–26	Tucson Roadrunners	AHL	59	21	30	51	75	—	—	—	—	—
NHL totals			2	0	0	0	4	—	—	—	—	—
