= Paul McFarland =

Canadian ice hockey player and coach

- Born: December 6, 1985 (age 40) Richmond Hill, Ontario, Canada
- Height: 6 ft 1 in (185 cm)
- Weight: 199 lb (90 kg; 14 st 3 lb)
- Position: Left Wing
- Shot: Left
- Played for: Kitchener Rangers; Windsor Spitfires; Acadia Axemen
- Current NHL coach: Edmonton Oilers
- Coached for: Oshawa Generals; Florida Panthers; Toronto Maple Leafs; Kingston Frontenacs; Seattle Kraken
- Playing career: 2002–2010
- Coaching career: 2012–present

Paul McFarland (born December 6, 1985) is a Canadian former ice hockey player and currently is an assistant coach on the Edmonton Oilers of the National Hockey League.

== Playing career ==
=== Junior hockey ===
==== Kitchener Rangers (2001–2005) ====
McFarland was drafted by the Kitchener Rangers in the 10th round, 184th overall, during the 2001 OHL Priority Selection. During the 2001–02 season, McFarland played with the Pickering Panthers of the OPJHL, where in 48 games, he scored 13 goals and 38 points.

He joined the Rangers for the 2002–03 season. On September 20, 2002, McFarland made his OHL debut, as he was held to no points in a 5–0 loss to the Windsor Spitfires. On October 11, McFarland scored his first career OHL goal and point, as he scored a third-period goal against Max Marion of the Erie Otters in a 9–1 victory. On January 24, McFarland earned his first career multi-point game of his OHL career, as he scored a goal and an assist in an 11–2 win. In 58 games, McFarland scored five goals and 17 points. On March 21, McFarland played in his first career postseason game as the Rangers defeated the Sault Ste. Marie Greyhounds 3–0. In 12 playoff games, McFarland had no points, as the Rangers won the J. Ross Robertson Cup and qualifying for the 2003 Memorial Cup. McFarland did not see any game action during the Memorial Cup; however, the Rangers won the championship, defeating the Hull Olympiques 6–3 in the final game.

McFarland returned to the Rangers for the 2003–04 season. In 59 games with the Rangers, McFarland scored 12 goals and 34 points. He suffered a late-season injury and was limited to only one postseason game, where he was held to no points. Following the season, McFarland won the Herchenrader Family Award, which is given to the Rangers player with the Best Defensive Ability.

In 2004–05, McFarland returned to Kitchener for a third season. In 39 games with the Rangers, McFarland scored eight goals and 14 points. On January 9, 2005, the Rangers traded McFarland and a sixth-round draft pick to the Windsor Spitfires for Ryan Donally.

==== Windsor Spitfires (2004–2006) ====
McFarland joined the Windsor Spitfires to finish the 2004–05 season, following a mid-season trade from the Kitchener Rangers. On January 13, 2005, McFarland played in his first game with Windsor, as he scored a goal against Ryan Nie of the Plymouth Whalers in a 5–2 victory. In 26 games with the Spitfires, McFarland scored three goals and 11 points. On March 31, McFarland played in his first playoff game with the Spitfires and earned his first career playoff point, as he assisted on the overtime winning goal scored by Steve Downie, in a 4–3 win over the Sault Ste. Marie Greyhounds. In 11 playoff games, McFarland earned two assists.

In 2005–06, McFarland was named captain of the club. On October 8, McFarland scored the first multi-goal game of his career, scoring two goals against the Plymouth Whalers in a 6–5 loss. On October 27, McFarland set a career-high for points in a game, as he scored two goals and added an assist for three points, in a 6–4 win over the London Knights. On November 5, McFarland scored his first career hat trick and added two assists, for a new career-high of five points in a game, as the Spitfires defeated the Saginaw Spirit 8–2. In 65 games during the regular season, McFarland set career highs in goals with 22 and points with 37. On April 2, 2006, McFarland scored his first career postseason goal, as he scored the game-winning goal against Justin Peters in a 7–4 win over the Plymouth Whalers. In seven playoff games, McFarland scored two goals and seven points.

=== University hockey ===
==== Acadia Axemen (2006–2010) ====
McFarland joined the Acadia Axemen of the Atlantic University Sport for the 2006–07 season. In his first season with the club, McFarland scored six goals and 19 points in 28 games. In two playoff games, McFarland earned an assist.

McFarland was named captain of the Axemen in his second season with the club. In 2007–08, McFarland scored eight goals and 25 points in 28 games, leading the team in scoring. In the postseason, he was limited to no points in two games.

In his third season with the Axemen in 2008–09, McFarland remained the captain of the club, as he scored seven goals and 15 points in 28 games. In the playoffs, McFarland scored a goal and four points in five games.

In his final season with Acadia in 2009–10, McFarland continued his captaincy duties. In 28 games, he scored four goals and 15 points. In the postseason, McFarland earned an assist in four games.

=== Regular season and playoffs ===
			Regular season					Playoffs
Season	Team	League	GP	G	A	Pts	PIM	GP	G	A	Pts	PIM
2001–02	Pickering Panthers	OPJHL	48	13	25	38	65	—	—	—	—	—
2002–03	Kitchener Rangers	OHL	58	5	12	17	51	12	0	0	0	4
2003–04	Kitchener Rangers	OHL	59	12	22	34	51	1	0	0	0	2
2004–05	Kitchener Rangers	OHL	38	8	6	14	29	—	—	—	—	—
2004–05	Windsor Spitfires	OHL	26	3	8	11	24	11	0	2	2	13
2005–06	Windsor Spitfires	OHL	65	22	15	37	61	7	2	5	7	10
2006–07	Acadia Axemen	AUS	28	6	13	19	38	2	0	1	1	0
2007–08	Acadia Axemen	AUS	28	8	17	25	30	2	0	0	0	2
2008–09	Acadia Axemen	AUS	28	7	8	15	79	5	1	3	4	21
2009–10	Acadia Axemen	AUS	28	4	11	15	24	4	0	1	1	4
OHL totals			246	50	63	113	216	31	2	7	9	27
AUS totals			112	25	49	74	171	13	1	5	6	27
OPJHL totals			48	13	25	38	65	—	—	—	—	—

== Coaching career ==
=== Oshawa Generals (2012–2014) ===
McFarland joined the Oshawa Generals on the Ontario Hockey League (OHL) as an assistant coach, working under the newly-hired head coach D.J. Smith. In his first season with the club in 2012–13, the Generals finished in third place in the Eastern Conference with a 42–22–1–3 record, earning 88 points. In the post-season, the Generals defeated the Niagara IceDogs in the conference quarter-finals, however, the club was swept by the Barrie Colts in the conference semi-finals.

In 2013–14, the Generals finished in first place in the Eastern Conference, as the club had a record of 42–20–0–6, earning 90 points. In the playoffs, Oshawa swept the Mississauga Steelheads in the conference quarter-finals, swept the Peterborough Petes in the conference semi-finals, and then were swept by the North Bay Battalion in a four games.

Following the season, McFarland resigned as the assistant coach of the club.

=== Kingston Frontenacs (2014–2017) ===
On May 20, 2014, the OHL's Kingston Frontenacs announced McFarland as their new head coach. On September 25, 2014, McFarland coached his first career game, as the Frontenacs defeated the Peterborough Petes 5–3. In his first season with the Frontenacs in 2014–15, he led the club to a 32–28–5–3 record, earning 72 points and sixth place in the Eastern Conference. On March 27, McFarland coached in his first playoff game, as the North Bay Battalion defeated the Frontenacs 8–0. The Frontenacs lost in the conference quarter-finals against the Battalion, as they were swept in four games.

The Frontenacs finished on top of the Eastern Conference in McFarland's second season with the club in 2015–16. Kingston set a franchise record for points in a season, as the club earned a 46–17–3–2 record, earning 97 points. In the conference quarter-finals, the Frontenacs defeated the Oshawa Generals in five games, which was the first time since 1998 that the club had won a playoff round. In the conference semi-finals, Kingston was upset by the Niagara IceDogs, as they lost in a four-game sweep.

Despite losing several top players to graduation, the Frontenacs remained competitive during the 2016–17 season. Kingston finished the season in fourth place in the Eastern Conference with a 33-26-5-4 record, earning 75 points. In the conference quarter-finals, the Frontenacs defeated the Hamilton Bulldogs in a thrilling seven-game series, as Kingston won game seven in overtime. In the conference semi-finals, the club was swept by the Peterborough Petes in four games.

Following the season, McFarland resigned from his position with the Frontenacs.

=== Florida Panthers (2017–2019) ===
McFarland joined the Florida Panthers coaching staff as an assistant coach, working with newly hired head coach Bob Boughner. In 2017–18, the Panthers missed the post-season by one point, as the club had a record of 44–30–8, earning 96 points and finishing in ninth place in the Eastern Conference, a 15-point improvement for the club from the previous season.

The Panthers slumped to a 36–32–14 record in the 2018–19 season, as they earned 86 points, dropping them to tenth place in the Eastern Conference. Following the season, Boughner and McFarland were relieved from their duties.

=== Toronto Maple Leafs (2019–2020) ===
On May 23, 2019, the Toronto Maple Leafs announced that McFarland was hired by the club as an assistant coach, working with head coach Mike Babcock. After the Leafs had a slow start to the 2019–20 season, the club fired head coach Mike Babcock and named Sheldon Keefe as head coach. McFarland remained with Toronto during this time.

On May 8, 2020, McFarland announced that he would be resigning as an assistant coach with the Maple Leafs at the end of the season. The Leafs' season concluded on August 9, 2020, after the club lost to the Columbus Blue Jackets in five games in the Eastern Conference qualifying round.

=== Kingston Frontenacs (2020–2021) ===
On May 8, 2020, the Kingston Frontenacs announced that McFarland was returning as head coach of the team after previously coaching the team from 2014 to 2017. On August 18, 2020, the Frontenacs announced that McFarland was also named the general manager of the club. However, the 2020–21 OHL season was entirely cancelled due the effects of the COVID-19 pandemic and McFarland left the team for an assistant coaching position with the NHL's new expansion team, the Seattle Kraken, without coaching a game in his second term in Kingston.

=== Seattle Kraken (2021-2024) ===
On July 6, 2021, McFarland was named an assistant coach for the Seattle Kraken, working under head coach Dave Hakstol, for the inaugural season of the franchise.

The Kraken struggled to a 27-49-6 record, earning 60 points and finishing in last place in the Pacific Division in the 2021-22 season, missing the postseason.

In 2022-23, Seattle improved to a 46-28-8 record, earning 100 points and a playoff position. In the post-season, the Kraken upset the Colorado Avalanche in the first round before losing to the Dallas Stars in seven games in the second round of the playoffs.

The Kraken struggled in the 2023-24 season, posting a record of 34-35-13, earning 83 points and missing the post-season, as the club finished in 12th place in the Western Conference.

McFarland was relieved of his duties on April 29, 2024, alongside Head Coach Dave Hakstol.

=== Calgary Hitmen (2024-2025) ===
On May 23, 2024, the Calgary Hitmen of the Western Hockey League named McFarland the head coach of the team.

On September 28, McFarland coached his first game in the WHL, as the Hitmen lost to the Edmonton Oil Kings 4-1. The next day, McFarland earned his first career WHL victory, as Calgary defeated the Lethbridge Hurricanes 3-1. In the 2024-25 season, McFarland led the club to a 45-17-6 record, earning 96 points and third place in the Eastern Conference. In the post-season, the Hitmen swept the Saskatoon Blades in the conference quarter-finals before losing to the Lethbridge Hurricanes in seven games in the conference semi-finals.

=== Edmonton Oilers (2025-pres) ===
On July 14, 2025, the Edmonton Oilers announced that the club hired McFarland as an assistant coach with the team and he worked under head coach Kris Knoblauch for the 2025-26 season. He currently remains in his position under new head coach Mike Babcock.

== Coaching record ==
=== Ontario Hockey League ===
Team	Year	Regular season						Postseason
Team	Year	G	W	L	OTL	Pts	Finish	Result
Kingston Frontenacs	2014–15	68	32	28	8	72	3rd in East	Lost in conference quarter-finals (0-4 vs. NB)
Kingston Frontenacs	2015–16	68	46	17	5	97	1st in East	Won in conference quarter-finals (4-1 vs. OSH); Lost in conference semi-finals (0-4 vs. NIA)
Kingston Frontenacs	2016–17	68	33	26	9	75	3rd in East	Won in conference quarter-finals (4-3 vs. HAM); Lost in conference semi-finals (0-4 vs. PBO)
OHL totals	2014–2017	204	111	71	22	244	1 Division Title	8-16 (0.333)

=== Western Hockey League ===
Team	Year	Regular season						Postseason
Team	Year	G	W	L	OTL	Pts	Finish	Result
Calgary Hitmen	2024–25	68	45	17	6	96	2nd in Central	Won in conference quarter-finals (4-0 vs. SAS); Lost in conference semi-finals (3-4 vs. LTH)
WHL totals	2024–2025	68	45	17	6	96	0 Division Titles	7-4 (0.636)

Sporting positions
Preceded by Todd Gill	Head coach of the Kingston Frontenacs; 2014–2017	Succeeded by Jay Varady
Preceded by Kurtis Foster	Head coach of the Kingston Frontenacs; 2020–2021	Succeeded by Luca Caputi
Preceded by Steve Hamilton	Head coach of the Calgary Hitmen; 2024–2025	Succeeded by TBA
