= Jay Varady =

American ice hockey player and coach

- Born: September 16, 1977 (age 48); Cahokia, Illinois, U.S.
- Education: Union College
- Occupation: Assistant coach of the Philadelphia Flyers

Jay Varady (born September 16, 1977) is an American former ice hockey player and current assistant coach for the Philadelphia Flyers of the National Hockey League (NHL). Prior to joining the NHL coaching ranks, Varady coached the Sioux City Musketeers in the United States Hockey League (USHL), the Kingston Frontenacs in the Ontario Hockey League (OHL), and the Tucson Roadrunners in the American Hockey League (AHL). He played college ice hockey for the Union Dutchmen.

== Early life and education ==
Varady grew up in St. Louis and played midget hockey in Chicago for the Chicago Young Americans. He graduated to the Dubuque Fighting Saints in the United States Hockey League (USHL) for two years before entering Union College. At Union, he played three seasons with their Division I hockey team from 1997 to 2000 before joining the coaching staff after a critical neck injury. Prior to his injury, Varady served as team captain for the 1999–00 season.

== Coaching career ==
After graduation, Varady coached the Chicago U16 AAA Team for the 2001 season. He then joined the coaching staff of the Pittsburgh Forge, from the North American Hockey League, for the 2002–03 season. The following year, he was an assistant and associate head coach with the Everett Silvertips of the Western Hockey League (WHL). In 2009, Varady was named Team USA's Video Coach for their 2010 World Junior Ice Hockey Championships team.

Varady stayed with the Silvertips until 2010, when he took two years off to coach in France's Ligue Magnus. Upon his return to North America, Varady took over the Sioux City Musketeers, where he helped lead them to a 136-88-16 record during his coaching seasons. This made him the third winningest coach in Musketeers’ history. As a result, Varady was awarded the 2017 USHL Coach of the Year Award. He was also selected by Team USA to coach their 2016 World Junior A Challenge team.

The following year, Varady joined the coaching staff of the Kingston Frontenacs in the Ontario Hockey League. He led Kingston to a record of 36–26–6–3, helping them reach the OHL Eastern Conference Finals for the first time in franchise history.

In 2018, Varady was named head coach of the Tucson Roadrunners of the American Hockey League (AHL), the affiliate of the Arizona Coyotes of the National Hockey League. In his second season as coach in Tucson, the Roadrunners were named the division champions when the season was curtailed by the COVID-19 pandemic. Prior to the postponed start of the 2020–21 season, Varady joined the Coyotes' staff as an assistant coach. In his two seasons as head coach, Tucson held a 70–45–6–5 record. Once the abbreviated AHL season was complete, he returned to Tucson on a three-year contract as head coach beginning with the 2021–22 season. He led the Roadrunners to a 93–84–11–6 record in four seasons.

On July 18, 2022, Varady was named assistant coach for the Detroit Red Wings for the 2022–23 season.

After three seasons in Detroit, Varady was hired as an assistant coach for the Philadelphia Flyers on June 5, 2025.

== Personal life ==
Varady married Joy, a nurse practitioner.

== Coaching record ==
=== American Hockey League ===
Team	Year	Regular season						Postseason
Team	Year	G	W	L	OTL	Pts	Finish	Result
Tucson Roadrunners	2018-19	68	34	26	8	76	5th in Pacific	Did not qualify
Tucson Roadrunners	2019-20	58	36	19	3	75	1st in Pacific	Playoffs cancelled due to COVID-19
Tucson Roadrunners	2021-22	68	23	39	6	52	8th in Pacific	Did not qualify
Tucson totals	2018–2022	194	93	84	17	203	1 Division Title	0–0 (0.000)

=== Ontario Hockey League ===
Team	Year	Regular season						Postseason
Team	Year	G	W	L	OTL	Pts	Finish	Result
Kingston Frontenacs	2017-18	68	36	23	9	81	2nd in East	Won in conference quarter-finals (4-1 vs. NB); Won in conference semi-finals (4-2 vs. BAR); Lost in conference finals (1-4 vs. HAM)
Kingston totals	2017–2018	68	36	23	9	81	0 Division Titles	9–7 (0.563)

=== United States Hockey League ===
Team	Year	Regular season						Postseason
Team	Year	G	W	L	OTL	Pts	Finish	Result
Sioux City Musketeers	2013-14	60	38	19	3	79	3rd in Western	Won in conference semi-finals (3-1 vs. OMA); Lost in conference finals (1-3 vs. WAT)
Sioux City Musketeers	2014-15	60	38	17	5	81	1st in Western	Lost in conference semi-finals (2-3 vs. SF)
Sioux City Musketeers	2015-16	60	20	39	1	41	8th in Western	Did not qualify
Sioux City Musketeers	2016-17	60	40	13	7	87	1st in Western	Won in conference semi-finals (3-0 vs. DM); Won in conference finals (3-2 vs. WAT); Lost in Clark Cup finals (2-3 vs. CHI)
Sioux City totals	2013–2017	240	136	88	16	288	2 Conference Titles	14–12 (0.538)

=== Ligue Magnus ===
Team	Year	Regular season							Postseason
Team	Year	G	W	OTW	L	OTL	Pts	Finish	Result
Ducs d'Angers	2011-12	26	14	2	8	2	34	5th in League	Won in preliminary round (3-0 vs. CAE); Lost in quarter-finals (1-3 vs. BRI)
Ducs d'Angers	2012-13	26	21	-	2	3	45	1st in League	Won in quarter-finals (3-2 vs. LOU); Won in semi-finals (3-1 vs. EPI); Lost in finals (3-4 vs. ROU)
Ducs d'Angers totals	2011–2013	52	35	2	10	5	79	1 Division Title	13–10 (0.565)

Sporting positions
Preceded by Martin Lacroix	Head Coach of Ducs d'Angers; 2011–2013	Succeeded by Simon Lacroix
Preceded by Brett Larson	Head Coach of the Sioux City Musketeers; 2013–2017	Succeeded by Luke Strand
Preceded by Paul McFarland	Head Coach of the Kingston Frontenacs; 2017-2018	Succeeded by Kurtis Foster
Preceded by Mike Van Ryn	Head Coach of the Tucson Roadrunners; 2018–2020	Succeeded by Steve Potvin
Preceded by Steve Potvin	Head Coach of the Tucson Roadrunners; 2021–present	Succeeded by Steve Potvin
