= Todd Gill =

Canadian ice hockey player

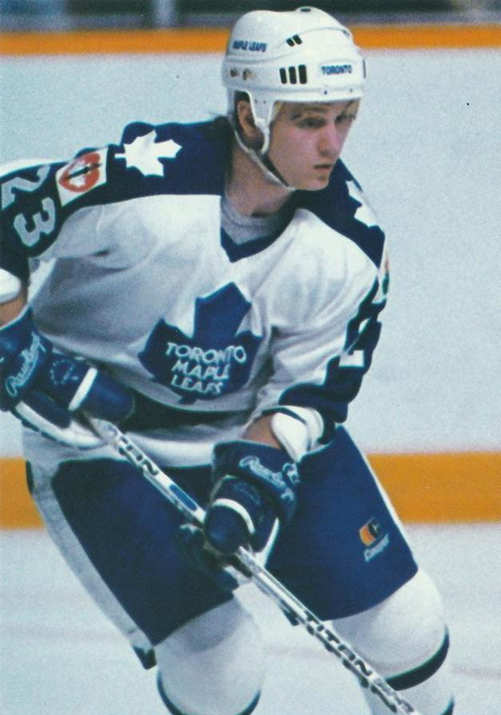
- Born: November 9, 1965 (age 60) Brockville, Ontario, Canada
- Height: 6 ft 1 in (185 cm)
- Weight: 180 lb (82 kg; 12 st 12 lb)
- Position: Defence
- Shot: Left
- Played for: Toronto Maple Leafs; San Jose Sharks; St. Louis Blues; Detroit Red Wings; Phoenix Coyotes; Colorado Avalanche; Chicago Blackhawks
- National team: Canada
- NHL draft: 25th overall, 1984; Toronto Maple Leafs
- Playing career: 1985–2004

Todd Sheldon Gill (born November 9, 1965) is a Canadian former professional ice hockey defenceman who played in the National Hockey League (NHL) between 1985 and 2003. He played the majority of his career for the Toronto Maple Leafs, and also played for the San Jose Sharks, St. Louis Blues, Detroit Red Wings, Phoenix Coyotes, Colorado Avalanche, and Chicago Blackhawks. Gill was born in Brockville, Ontario, but grew up in Cardinal, Ontario.

== Playing career ==
=== Junior ===
==== Windsor Spitfires (1982–85) ====
Gill was selected in the second round, 18th overall selection, by the Windsor Spitfires of the OHL in the 1982 OHL Priority Selection draft. In his rookie season with the club in the 1982–83 season, Gill scored 12 goals and 36 points in 70 games. In three playoff games, Gill was held off the scoresheet.

He returned to the Spitfires for the 1983–84 season, and scored nine goals and 57 points in 68 games to lead all Windsor defensemen. Gill also tallied a team high 184 penalty minutes. In three playoff games, Gill had a goal and two points. After the season, he was drafted by the Toronto Maple Leafs in the second round, 25th overall in the 1984 NHL entry draft.

Gill came back to Windsor for the 1984-85 OHL season, and in 53 games with the newly renamed Compuware Spitfires, Gill scored 17 goals and 57 points to lead the defense in scoring, and was fourth in overall team scoring. In four playoff games, Gill earned an assist.

=== Professional ===
==== Toronto Maple Leafs (1984–96) ====
Gill appeared in 10 games with the Toronto Maple Leafs in the 1984–85 season, scoring a goal and recording 13 penalty minutes.

Gill spent most of the 1985–86 season with the Maple Leafs' American Hockey League (AHL) affiliate, the St. Catharines Saints, and scored eight goals and 33 points in 58 games. Gill also spent 15 games with the Maple Leafs during the 1985-86 season, scoring a goal and three points. Gill appeared in a playoff game for Toronto, going pointless as the Leafs lost to the St. Louis Blues in the Norris Division final. Gill also played in 10 playoff games in St. Catharines, scoring a goal and seven points.

He played in 11 games with the Leafs' newly relocated AHL team, the Newmarket Saints in the 1986-87 season, scoring a goal and nine points. In 61 games with Toronto during the 1986-87 season, he scored four goals and 31 points, which led Maple Leafs defensemen in points. In 13 playoff games, Gill had two goals and four points, as the Leafs lost to the Detroit Red Wings in the Norris Division final.

Gill only played two games with the Saints in the 1987–88 AHL season, earning no points, as he spent the majority of time with the Maple Leafs during the 1987–88 NHL season. Gill appeared in 65 games with Toronto, scoring eight goals and 25 points, while registering 131 penalty minutes, the second-highest total on the team. In six playoff games, Gill had a goal and four points as the Maple Leafs lost to the Red Wings in the first round of the playoffs.

Injuries limited Gill to 59 games during the 1988–89 NHL season, however, he scored 11 goals and 25 points, as the Leafs failed to qualify for the playoffs.

Gill suffered through another injury-plagued season during the 1989–90 season, as he appeared in only 48 games, scoring a goal and 15 points, his lowest totals since becoming a regular NHL player. Gill had a solid showing in the playoffs, earning three assists in five games, as the Leafs lost to the Blues in the first round.

He played in 72 games during the 1990–91 season, scoring two goals and 24 points, as the Leafs failed to qualify for the playoffs.

In 1991-92, Gill stayed healthy again, appearing in 74 games, scoring two goals and 17 points, however, the rebuilding Leafs missed the playoffs for the third time in four seasons.

Gill had a very solid 1992–93, as he tied his career high with 11 goals and set a career high with 43 points in 69 games to lead the Leafs defense in scoring, and was fourth overall in team scoring, helping the team qualify for the playoffs. In 21 playoff games, Gill had a goal and 11 points, as the Leafs lost to the Los Angeles Kings in the Campbell Conference finals.

Gill suffered through a tough 1993–94, as he played in only 45 games, scoring four goals and 28 points. In 18 games in the playoffs, Gill chipped in with a goal and six points, as Toronto made the Western Conference finals, where they lost to the Vancouver Canucks.

He rebounded during 1994–95, as in the lockout-shortened season, Gill scored seven goals and 32 points in 47 games to lead the Leafs defense and finished fifth in overall team scoring. In seven playoff games, Gill had three assists as Toronto lost to the Chicago Blackhawks in the first round.

Gill saw his offensive numbers struggle during the 1995–96 season, scoring seven goals and 25 points in 74 games, his lowest point total since the 1991–92 season. In six playoff games, Gill was held pointless. On June 14, 1996, the Maple Leafs traded Gill to the San Jose Sharks for Jamie Baker and the Sharks' fifth round draft pick in the 1996 NHL entry draft.

==== San Jose Sharks (1996–98) ====
Gill was named as captain of the San Jose Sharks after the team acquired him from the Toronto Maple Leafs. Gill appeared in 79 games with the San Jose Sharks in 1996–97. He recorded 21 assists but no goals, the first season in which he didn't score a goal. The Sharks failed to make the playoffs.

He began the 1997–98 season with San Jose and scored eight goals and notched 21 points. With the Sharks needing scoring help for their playoff pursuit, the team traded Gill to the St. Louis Blues for Joe Murphy on March 24, 1998.

==== St. Louis Blues (1998) ====
Gill finished the 1997–98 season with St. Louis. In 11 games with the Blues, he had five goals and nine points, which gave him a combined total of 13 goals, a career high, and 30 points, his highest points total since 1994–95. In the playoffs, Gill had two goals and four points in 10 games, but the Blues lost to the Detroit Red Wings in the second round.

He started the 1998–99 season in St. Louis, and during 28 games, Gill had two goals and five points. The Blues put Gill on waivers, and on December 30, 1998, he was claimed by the Red Wings.

==== Detroit Red Wings (1998–99) ====
Gill finished the 1998–99 season with the Detroit Red Wings, and in 23 games, Gill had two goals and four points. He appeared in two playoff games with the Red Wings, recording one point as Detroit lost to the Colorado Avalanche in the second round.

Following the season, Gill was granted free agency.

==== Phoenix Coyotes and return to Detroit ====
On July 21, 1999, Gill signed with the Phoenix Coyotes. He appeared in 41 games with the Coyotes in the 1999–2000 season, scoring a goal and seven points. His stay with Phoenix was short, as on March 13, 2000, the Coyotes traded Gill back to the Red Wings for Philippe Audet.

Gill finished off the 1999–2000 season with the Detroit Red Wings, scoring two goals in 13 games. In the playoffs, Gill had an assist in nine games as the Wings lost to the Avalanche in the second round.

He returned to Detroit for the 2000–01 season, and Gill had three goals and 11 points in 68 games. In the playoffs, Gill had no points in five games, as Detroit lost to the Los Angeles Kings in the first round.

Gill became a free agent at the conclusion of the season.

==== Colorado Avalanche (2001–02) ====
On July 24, 2001, Gill signed with the Avalanche. He appeared in 36 games with Colorado during 2001–02, earning four assists in limited ice time with the team. The Avalanche released him on February 12, 2002.

==== Chicago Blackhawks (2002–03) ====
Gill signed with the Springfield Falcons of the AHL for the 2002–03 season, and in 15 games he had a goal and six points. On March 5, 2003, Gill left the Falcons, and signed a contract with the Chicago Blackhawks.

He appeared in five games with the Chicago Blackhawks in 2002–03, earning an assist. He also appeared in nine games with the Blackhawks' AHL affiliate, the Norfolk Admirals, recording three assists in those games. Gill then appeared in nine playoff games with Norfolk, scoring two goals and seven points.

Gill became a free agent after the season. On August 20, 2003, signed a contract with the Florida Panthers, but was cut by the team during the pre-season.

==== Lausitzer Füchse (2003–04) ====
A free agent again, he signed with Lausitzer Füchse of the 2nd Bundesliga in Germany. In 25 games, Gill had six goals and 25 points. Gill had a goal and two points in four playoff games to complete his playing career.

== Career statistics ==
=== Regular season and playoffs ===
			Regular season					Playoffs
Season	Team	League	GP	G	A	Pts	PIM	GP	G	A	Pts	PIM
1980–81	Cardinal Broncos	EOJHL	35	10	14	24	65	—	—	—	—	—
1981–82	Brockville Braves	CJHL	48	5	16	21	169	—	—	—	—	—
1982–83	Windsor Spitfires	OHL	70	12	24	36	108	3	0	0	0	11
1983–84	Windsor Spitfires	OHL	68	9	48	57	184	3	1	1	2	10
1984–85	Windsor Spitfires	OHL	53	17	40	57	148	4	0	1	1	14
1984–85	Toronto Maple Leafs	NHL	10	1	0	1	13	—	—	—	—	—
1985–86	St. Catharines Saints	AHL	58	8	25	33	90	10	1	6	7	17
1985–86	Toronto Maple Leafs	NHL	15	1	2	3	28	1	0	0	0	0
1986–87	Newmarket Saints	AHL	11	1	8	9	33	—	—	—	—	—
1986–87	Toronto Maple Leafs	NHL	61	4	27	31	92	13	2	2	4	42
1987–88	Newmarket Saints	AHL	2	0	1	1	2	—	—	—	—	—
1987–88	Toronto Maple Leafs	NHL	65	8	17	25	131	6	1	3	4	20
1988–89	Toronto Maple Leafs	NHL	59	11	14	25	72	—	—	—	—	—
1989–90	Toronto Maple Leafs	NHL	48	1	14	15	92	5	0	3	3	16
1990–91	Toronto Maple Leafs	NHL	72	2	22	24	113	—	—	—	—	—
1991–92	Toronto Maple Leafs	NHL	74	2	15	17	91	—	—	—	—	—
1992–93	Toronto Maple Leafs	NHL	69	11	32	43	66	21	1	10	11	26
1993–94	Toronto Maple Leafs	NHL	45	4	24	28	44	18	1	5	6	37
1994–95	Toronto Maple Leafs	NHL	47	7	25	32	64	7	0	3	3	6
1995–96	Toronto Maple Leafs	NHL	74	7	18	25	116	6	0	0	0	24
1996–97	San Jose Sharks	NHL	79	0	21	21	101	—	—	—	—	—
1997–98	San Jose Sharks	NHL	64	8	13	21	31	—	—	—	—	—
1997–98	St. Louis Blues	NHL	11	5	4	9	10	10	2	2	4	10
1998–99	St. Louis Blues	NHL	28	2	3	5	16	—	—	—	—	—
1998–99	Detroit Red Wings	NHL	23	2	2	4	11	2	0	1	1	0
1999–2000	Phoenix Coyotes	NHL	41	1	6	7	30	—	—	—	—	—
1999–2000	Detroit Red Wings	NHL	13	2	0	2	15	9	0	1	1	4
2000–01	Cincinnati Mighty Ducks	AHL	2	0	1	1	2	—	—	—	—	—
2000–01	Detroit Red Wings	NHL	68	3	8	11	53	5	0	0	0	8
2001–02	Colorado Avalanche	NHL	36	0	4	4	25	—	—	—	—	—
2002–03	Chicago Blackhawks	NHL	5	0	1	1	0	—	—	—	—	—
2002–03	Springfield Falcons	AHL	15	1	5	6	20	—	—	—	—	—
2002–03	Norfolk Admirals	AHL	9	0	3	3	10	9	2	5	7	10
2003–04	Lausitzer Füchse	DEU.3	25	6	19	25	42	4	1	1	2	2
NHL totals			1,007	82	272	354	1,214	103	7	30	37	193

=== International ===
Year	Team	Event	Result	GP	G	A	Pts	PIM
1992	Canada	WC	8th	6	0	3	3	6
Senior totals				6	0	3	3	6

== Coaching career ==
=== Brockville Braves (2006–11) ===
Gill coached the Brockville Braves of the CJHL for five seasons, as the team posted a record of 198-81-22 under Gill. In 2010–11, he guided the Braves to the Eastern Canadian championship, and a berth in the 2010 Royal Bank Cup.

=== Kingston Frontenacs (2011–14) ===
Gill became the head coach of the Kingston Frontenacs of the Ontario Hockey League in 2011. In his first season with the club in 2011–12, Gill led the rebuilding club to a 19-41-8 record, earning 46 points, as Kingston failed to qualify for the post-season.

The Frontenacs improved to a 27-35-6 record in 2012–13, earning 60 points, and seventh place in the Eastern Conference. In the playoffs, the Frontenacs were swept by the Barrie Colts in the first round.

Gill led the Frontenacs to their first winning record under his coaching tenure in 2013–14, as Kingston had a 39-23-3-3 record, earning 84 points, and third place in the Eastern Conference. The Frontenacs faced the Peterborough Petes in the opening round of the playoffs, and took a 3–0 series lead, however, the club then lost their next four games to be knocked out of the post-season. On May 5, 2014, the Frontenacs announced that Gill would not be returning as head coach as his contract was not extended.

=== Adirondack Flames (2014–15) ===
Gill joined the Adirondack Flames of the AHL as an assistant coach, working under head coach Ryan Huska, for the 2014–15 season. The Adirondack Flames were the new AHL affiliate of the Calgary Flames, as Calgary relocated their AHL team, the Abbotsford Heat, to Adirondack during the summer of 2014. Adirondack finished the 2014–15 season with a 35-33-6-2 record, earning 78 points and a fourth-place finish in the North Division. The club failed to qualify for the post-season and the club relocated to Stockton, California and became the Stockton Heat following the season.

=== Stockton Heat (2015–17) ===
Gill remained with the Calgary Flames organization and relocated from Adirondack to Stockton for the inaugural season of the Stockton Heat during the 2015–16 season. Gill remained an assistant coach with the club, as did head coach Ryan Huska. During the 2015–16 season, the Heat earned a record of 32-32-2-2, earning 68 points and a sixth-place finish in the Pacific Division, failing the qualify for the post-season.

In 2016–17, the Heat improved to a record of 34-25-7-2, earning 77 points and a fourth-place finish in the Pacific Division, earning a berth in the 2017 Calder Cup playoffs. In the post-season, the Heat lost to the first place San Jose Barracuda in five games.

=== Owen Sound Attack (2017–19) ===
On July 14, 2017, Gill was announced as the head coach of the Owen Sound Attack of the OHL. Gill led the Attack to a strong record of 38-22-3-5 record in 2017–18, earning 84 points and second place in the Midwest Division, and fourth place in the Western Conference. In the post-season, the Attack swept the London Knights in the first round of the playoffs before the club lost to the Sault Ste. Marie Greyhounds in seven games in the conference semi-finals.

Gill returned to the Attack for the 2018–19 season. With the team beginning a rebuild midway through the season, the Attack relieved Gill of his duties on January 28, 2019. At the time of the coaching change, Gill led the Attack to a 23-20-2-2 record, earning 50 points in 47 games.

== Coaching record ==
=== Ontario Hockey League ===
Team	Year	Regular season						Postseason
Team	Year	G	W	L	OTL	Pts	Finish	Result
Kingston Frontenacs	2011–12	68	19	41	8	46	5th in East	Missed playoffs
Kingston Frontenacs	2012–13	68	27	35	6	60	3rd in East	Lost in conference quarter-finals (0-4 vs. BAR)
Kingston Frontenacs	2013–14	68	39	23	6	84	2nd in East	Lost in conference quarter-finals (3-4 vs. PBO)
Owen Sound Attack	2017–18	68	38	22	8	84	2nd in Midwest	Won in conference quarter-finals (4-0 vs. LDN); Lost in conference semi-finals (3-4 vs. SSM)
Owen Sound Attack	2018–19	47	23	20	4	50	3rd in Midwest	Fired
Kingston totals	2011–2014	204	85	99	20	190		3-8 (0.273)
Owen Sound totals	2017–2019	115	61	42	12	134		7-4 (0.636)
OHL totals	2011–2019	319	146	141	32	324		10-12 (0.455)

== See also ==
- Captain (ice hockey)
- List of NHL players with 1,000 games played

Sporting positions
Preceded by Jeff Odgers	San Jose Sharks captain 1996–98	Succeeded by Owen Nolan
Preceded by Doug Gilmour	Head Coach of the Kingston Frontenacs; 2011–14	Succeeded by Paul McFarland
Preceded by Ryan McGill	Head Coach of the Owen Sound Attack; 2017–19	Succeeded by Alan Letang
