= Michael Bunting =

Canadian ice hockey player (born 1995)

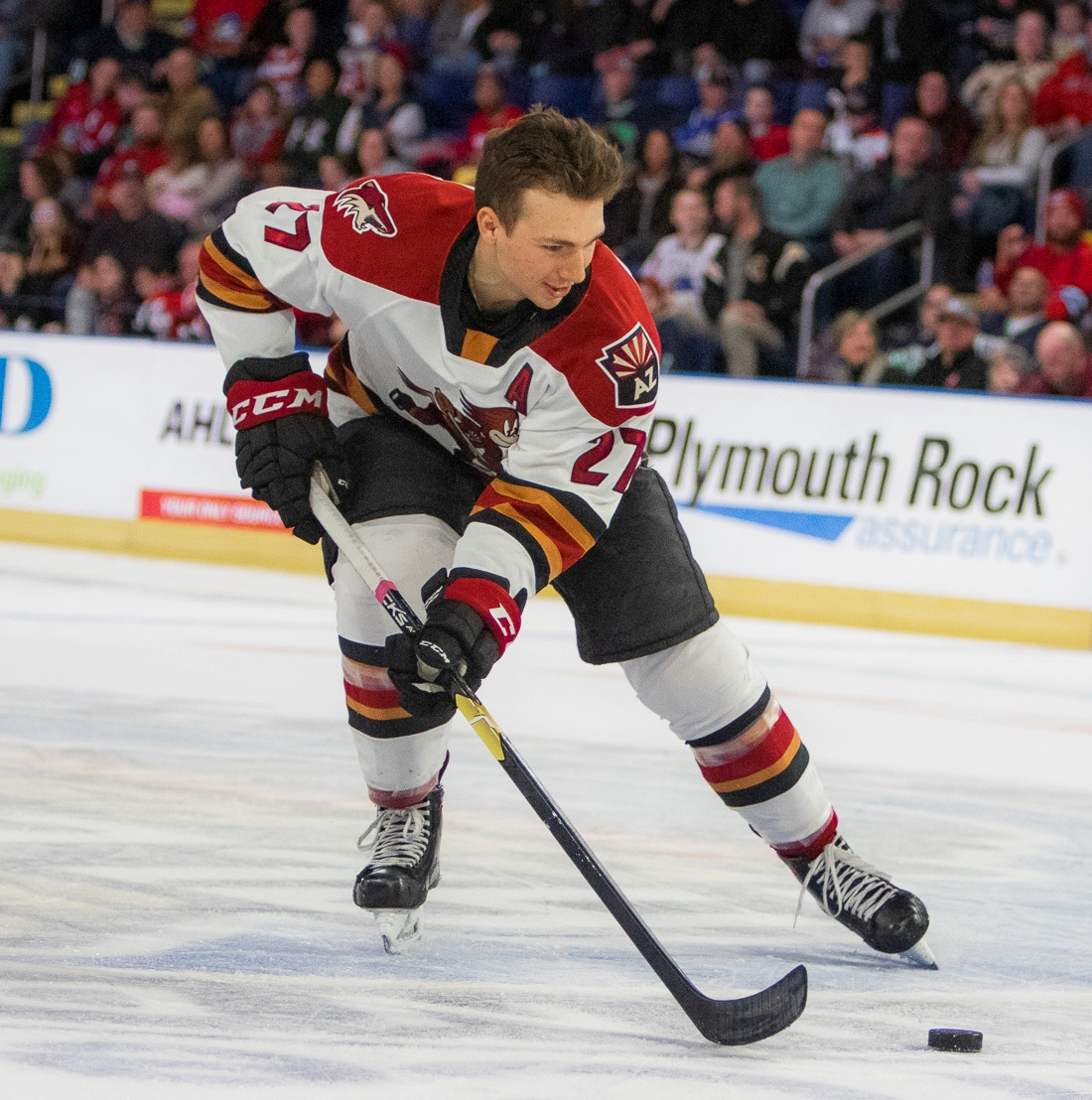
- Bunting with the Tucson Roadrunners in 2019
- Born: September 17, 1995 (age 31) Scarborough, Ontario, Canada
- Height: 6 ft 0 in (183 cm)
- Weight: 186 lb (84 kg; 13 st 4 lb)
- Position: Left wing
- Shoots: Left
- NHL team Former teams: Philadelphia Flyers; Arizona Coyotes; Toronto Maple Leafs; Carolina Hurricanes; Pittsburgh Penguins; Nashville Predators; Dallas Stars
- National team: Canada
- NHL draft: 117th overall, 2014; Arizona Coyotes
- Playing career: 2015–present

Michael Bunting (born September 17, 1995) is a Canadian professional ice hockey player who is a left winger for the Philadelphia Flyers of the National Hockey League (NHL). Bunting was selected by the Arizona Coyotes, 117th overall, in the 2014 NHL entry draft. He has also played for the Toronto Maple Leafs, Carolina Hurricanes, Pittsburgh Penguins, Nashville Predators, and Dallas Stars.

== Playing career ==
=== Junior ===
Bunting played midget hockey with the Don Mills Flyers in the Greater Toronto Hockey League. Despite not playing in AAA hockey, the then general manager of the Ontario Hockey League (OHL)'s Sault Ste. Marie Greyhounds, Kyle Dubas, spotted him while scouting another overage player in the league. The Greyhounds selected him 160th overall in the 2013 OHL Priority Selection, after Bunting had been passed over in the previous two drafts. Playing as a rookie with the Greyhounds in 2013–14, Bunting produced 42 points in 48 games. During the 2014–15 season, Bunting led the Greyhounds with 37 goals in 57 games and 14 points in 14 playoff games.

=== Professional ===
==== Arizona Coyotes (2015–2021) ====
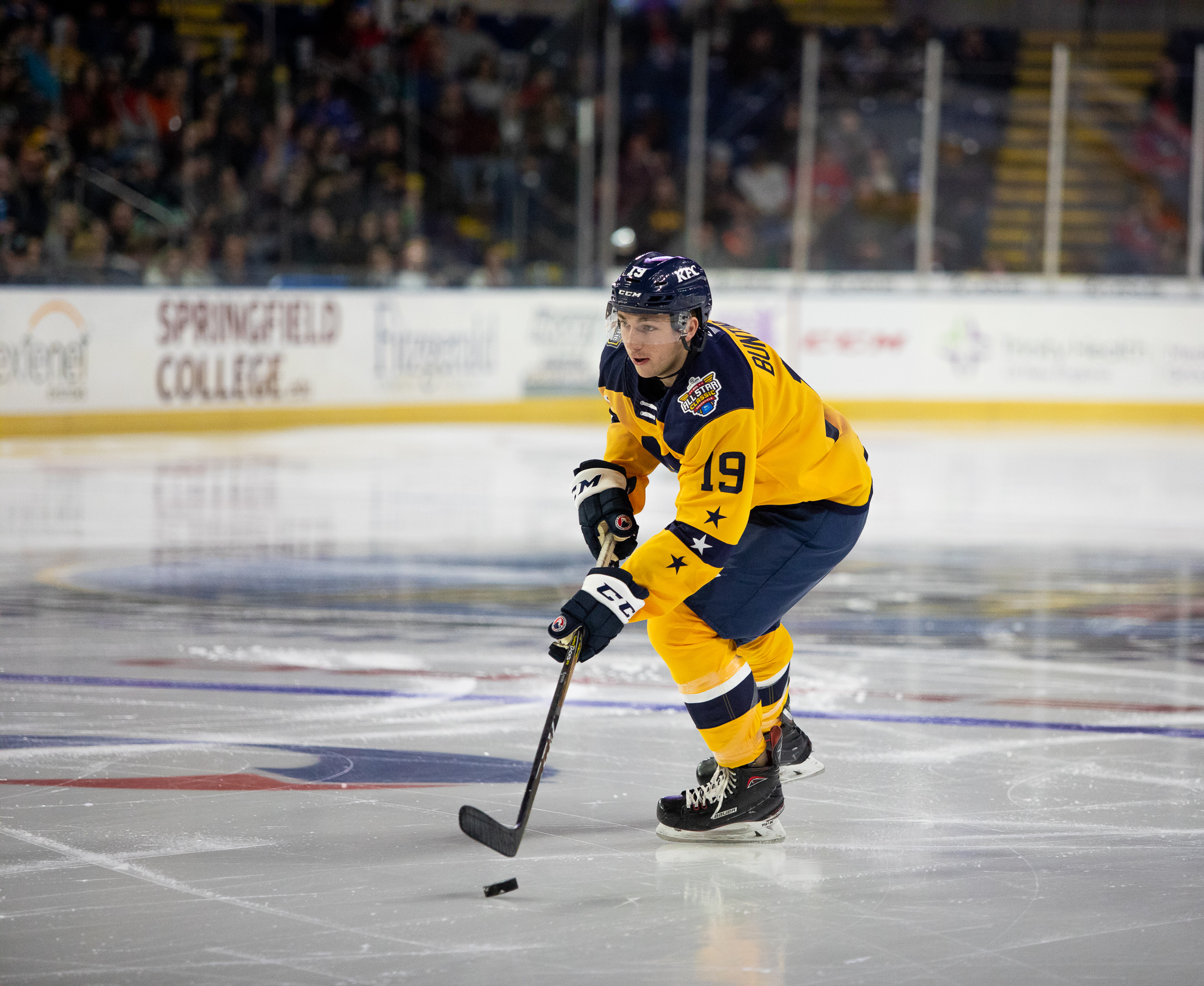
Bunting representing the Tucson Roadrunners during the 2019 AHL All-Star Classic

The Arizona Coyotes made Bunting their fourth-round pick, 117th overall, in the 2014 NHL entry draft. He signed a three-year entry-level contract with the Coyotes on July 23, 2015. Bunting made the jump to the Coyotes' professional ranks in the 2015–16 season with the Springfield Falcons of the American Hockey League (AHL). The Coyotes briefly assigned him to the ECHL's Rapid City Rush early in the season where he scored his first professional goal, before returning him to Springfield. He finished the season with 11 goals and 25 points with the Falcons. The following season the Coyotes transferred their AHL affiliate to the Tucson Roadrunners. In the 2017–18 season with Tucson, Bunting scored 23 goals and 43 points, tied for first on the team in goals and third in points.

Bunting became a restricted free agent after the expiry of his entry-level contract. He signed a one-year, two-way deal to stay with the Coyotes on July 14, 2018. While playing with the Roadrunners in the 2018–19 season, Bunting made his 200th AHL appearance on October 13, 2018, in a game against the Bakersfield Condors. The Coyotes recalled Bunting to the NHL for the first time on December 7, 2018. At the time, he ranked second on the Roadrunners with 18 points in 20 games. Bunting scored his first NHL goal in his debut, beating Boston Bruins goaltender Tuukka Rask in the second period of a 4–3 Coyotes loss on December 11, 2018. He was returned to Tucson on December 17 after appearing in four games. He was recalled again on January 9, 2019, February 6 and February 17, bouncing between the AHL and NHL. He only appeared in one more NHL game that season. Bunting was named to the 2019 AHL All-Star Classic in January 2019. On March 14, he became the first member of the Roadrunners to reach 100 points with the team.

Bunting spent the entire 2019–20 season with the Roadrunners. He opened the 2020–21 season again in the AHL and was named the AHL player of the week for ending on February 14, 2021. Bunting returned to the Coyotes' lineup on March 31, 2021, and spent the rest of the 2020–21 season in the NHL. He registered a goal and an assist in his season debut, a 9–3 Coyotes loss to the Colorado Avalanche, before scoring his first NHL hat-trick against the Los Angeles Kings on April 5, 2021. He played the first fourteen games of his career away from home, setting an NHL record. In his first home game in Phoenix on April 17, Bunting scored a goal. Despite playing just 21 games with the Coyotes in 2020–21, Bunting ultimately tied with Nick Schmaltz for sixth on the team with 10 goals.

==== Toronto Maple Leafs (2021–2023) ====
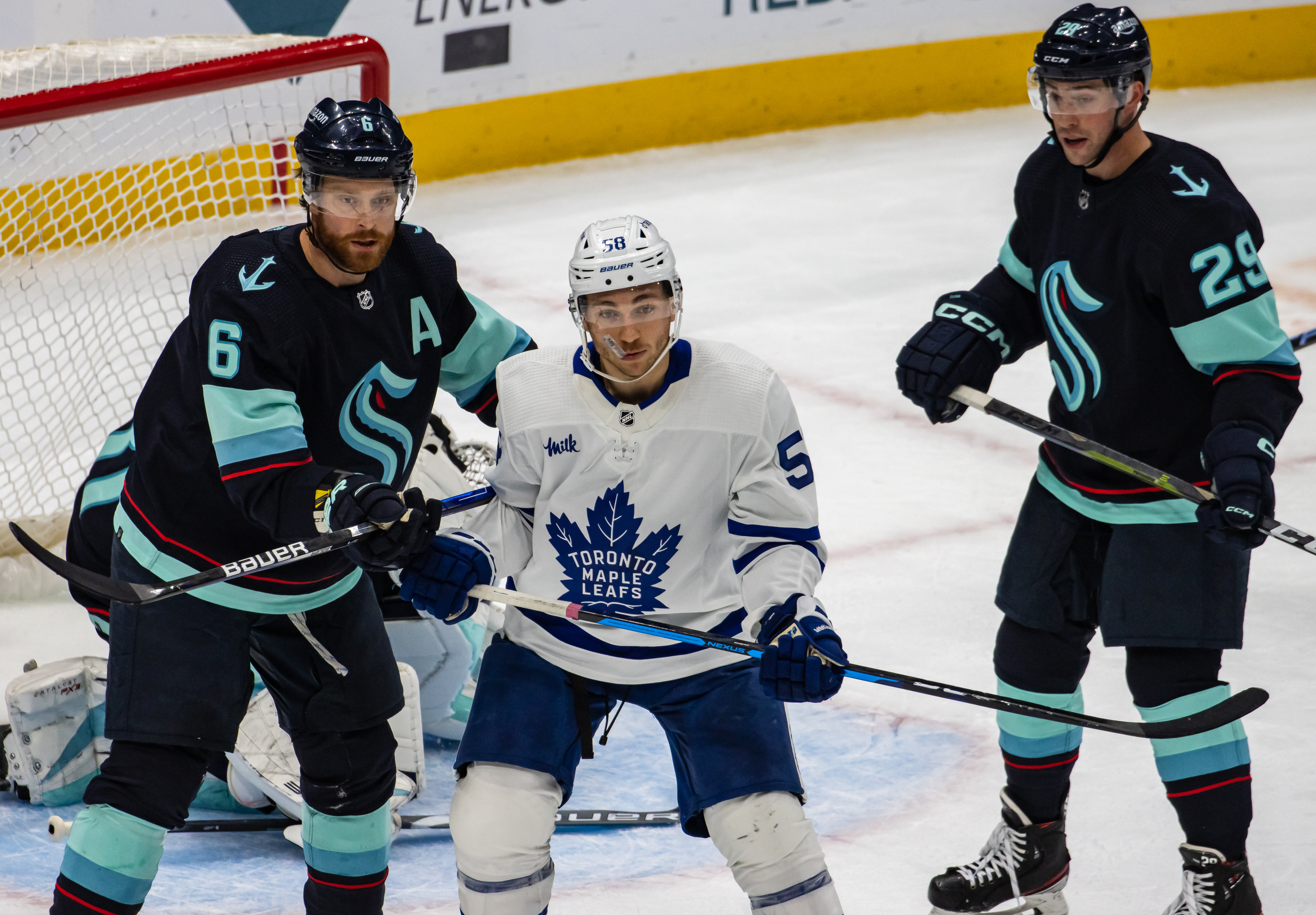
Bunting (middle) in between Adam Larsson and Vince Dunn in 2023

As a group 6 free agent after breaking out with the Coyotes, Bunting was signed to a two-year, $1.9 million contract with the Toronto Maple Leafs on July 28, 2021. He left the Coyotes franchise being the Roadrunners' all-time leader in games played, goals, assists, points, and penalty minutes. Bunting spent most of the season as the left winger on the team's top line with Auston Matthews and Mitch Marner. On January 29, 2022, Bunting became the first player to score a hat-trick the same day his hometown was featured on Scotiabank Hockey Day in Canada. In his first year with the Maple Leafs, Bunting was named as a finalist for the Calder Memorial Trophy for the league's best rookie. Although he would not ultimately win the award, Bunting was voted to the NHL All-Rookie Team.

Entering his second season with Toronto, Bunting began to develop a reputation as an effective penalty drawing forward who was capable of agitating opponents; by mid-December 2022, he led the league in drawn penalties at even strength play by a sizeable margin, despite being reported to have a contentious relationship with officials. Around the time this narrative began to gain some traction in media circles, Bunting began to experience a notable turn in referee calls, with him drawing noticeably fewer penalties while increasingly being disciplined for relatively minor infractions. In late December, Bunting was aggressively shoved off the ice by an official while being assessed a minor penalty, stirring a small controversy. After a build up of what some commentators had perceived to have been light calls against over the next several months, Bunting's relationship with the referees came to heightened media attention after he was assessed a 10-minute major penalty and a game misconduct for skating into an opposing players' dropped stick during a match on April 2, 2023. In response, Maple Leafs' management announced that they would initiate a meeting with the NHL to discuss officiating bias against Bunting. He finished the season 23 goals and 49 points in 82 games and added a goal and two points in seven playoff games. He was suspended for three games in the 2023 Stanley Cup playoffs after striking Erik Černák of the Tampa Bay Lightning in the head in Game 1 of the first round matchup.

==== Carolina Hurricanes (2023–2024) ====
At the conclusion of his contract with the Maple Leafs, Bunting tested the free agent market on July 1, 2023, and was signed by the Carolina Hurricanes to a three-year, $13.5 million contract. He made his debut with Carolina on October 13, 2023, scoring the Hurricanes' first goal of the game against Joonas Korpisalo in a 5–3 win over the Ottawa Senators. On his return to Toronto on December 30, he scored the Hurricanes' first goal in the game, a 3–2 win over the Maple Leafs. He played in 60 games with Carolina, scoring 13 goals and 36 points.

==== Pittsburgh Penguins (2024–2025) ====
On March 7, 2024, Bunting was traded to the Pittsburgh Penguins, along with Ville Koivunen, prospect Cruz Lucius, Vasili Ponomaryov and two conditional 2024 draft picks, in exchange for Jake Guentzel and Ty Smith. Bunting made his Pittsburgh debut on March 9 versus the Boston Bruins. He scored his first goal in a Penguins uniform on March 12 against the Ottawa Senators. After starting the first four games on a line with Sidney Crosby, he was switched to Evgeni Malkin's line alongside Rickard Rakell with the three picking up points in eight straight games. Bunting and Rakell scored two goals in that time, with Malkin potting six.

==== Nashville Predators (2025–2026) ====
On March 5, 2025, Bunting was traded to the Nashville Predators alongside a fourth-round draft pick, in exchange for Tommy Novak and Luke Schenn.

==== Dallas Stars (2026) ====
On March 5, 2026, Bunting was traded to the Dallas Stars in exchange for a 2026 third-round pick.

==== Philadelphia Flyers (2026-present) ====
On October 6, 2026, after spending time in free agency, Bunting signed with the Philadelphia Flyers on a one year, 1.2 million AAV deal.

== International play ==
Medal record

Representing Canada

Ice hockey

World Championships
Gold medal – first place	2021 Latvia	

Team Canada general manager, Roberto Luongo, invited Bunting to participate at the 2021 IIHF World Championship following the 2020–21 season, giving him his first opportunity to represent his home country on an international stage. Team Canada reached the gold medal game, defeating Finland for the title.

Following the end of the 2023–24 NHL season, with the Penguins not qualifying for the 2024 Stanley Cup playoffs, Bunting rejoined the senior national team for the 2024 IIHF World Championship.

== Personal life ==
Bunting was born in Scarborough, a suburb of Toronto, to his parents Andy, a civil servant for the City of Toronto, and Lynda, a bookkeeper at Shoppers Drug Mart. Andy and Lynda divorced early and Michael was primarily raised by his mother, a breast cancer survivor. He has an older brother, Christopher.

== Career statistics ==
=== Regular season and playoffs ===
			Regular season					Playoffs
Season	Team	League	GP	G	A	Pts	PIM	GP	G	A	Pts	PIM
2012–13	Don Mills Flyers	GTHL	28	27	12	39	44	—	—	—	—	—
2013–14	Sault Ste. Marie Greyhounds	OHL	48	15	27	42	34	9	5	1	6	4
2014–15	Sault Ste. Marie Greyhounds	OHL	57	37	37	74	39	14	9	5	14	10
2015–16	Springfield Falcons	AHL	63	11	14	25	41	—	—	—	—	—
2015–16	Rapid City Rush	ECHL	7	2	0	2	4	—	—	—	—	—
2016–17	Tucson Roadrunners	AHL	67	13	15	28	52	—	—	—	—	—
2017–18	Tucson Roadrunners	AHL	67	23	20	43	45	9	3	1	4	27
2018–19	Tucson Roadrunners	AHL	52	19	22	41	84	—	—	—	—	—
2018–19	Arizona Coyotes	NHL	5	1	0	1	2	—	—	—	—	—
2019–20	Tucson Roadrunners	AHL	58	12	37	49	49	—	—	—	—	—
2020–21	Tucson Roadrunners	AHL	16	7	12	19	14	—	—	—	—	—
2020–21	Arizona Coyotes	NHL	21	10	3	13	12	—	—	—	—	—
2021–22	Toronto Maple Leafs	NHL	79	23	40	63	80	6	1	2	3	4
2022–23	Toronto Maple Leafs	NHL	82	23	26	49	103	7	1	1	2	15
2023–24	Carolina Hurricanes	NHL	60	13	23	36	55	—	—	—	—	—
2023–24	Pittsburgh Penguins	NHL	21	6	13	19	2	—	—	—	—	—
2024–25	Pittsburgh Penguins	NHL	58	14	15	29	48	—	—	—	—	—
2024–25	Nashville Predators	NHL	18	5	4	9	20	—	—	—	—	—
2025–26	Nashville Predators	NHL	61	13	18	31	16	—	—	—	—	—
2025–26	Dallas Stars	NHL	13	1	1	2	4	1	0	1	1	0
NHL totals			418	109	143	252	342	14	2	4	6	19

=== International ===
Year	Team	Event	Result	GP	G	A	Pts	PIM
2021	Canada	WC	1st place, gold medalist(s)	10	0	0	0	6
2024	Canada	WC	4th	10	1	3	4	4
Senior totals				20	1	3	4	10
