= Road racing (disambiguation) =

Road racing is a type of motorsport racing.

Road racing, road race, or road racer may also refer to:

- Road running on foot
- Road bicycle racing
- Road Race (video game), rebranded Fonz, a 1976 arcade game
- Roadracers (1959 film), an American action film
- Roadracers (1994 film), an American television film by Robert Rodriguez

== See also ==
- Racing
- Roadrunner (disambiguation)
