= Tucson Roadrunners =

American Hockey League team in Tucson, Arizona

- City: Tucson, Arizona
- League: American Hockey League
- Conference: Western
- Division: Pacific
- Founded: 1994
- Home arena: Tucson Convention Center
- Colors: Brick red, forest green, black, sand, purple, sienna
- Owner: Alex Meruelo
- General manager: John Ferguson Jr.
- Head coach: Steve Potvin
- Captain: Austin Poganski
- Media: Arizona Daily Star; KTZR (Fox Sports 1450); FloHockey (Streaming)
- Affiliates: Utah Mammoth (NHL)
- Website: tucsonroadrunners.com

Franchise history
- 1994–2016: Springfield Falcons
- 2016–present: Tucson Roadrunners

Championships
- Division titles: 2: (2017–18, 2019–20)

The Tucson Roadrunners are a professional ice hockey team based in Tucson, Arizona. They are the American Hockey League (AHL) affiliate of the National Hockey League's (NHL) Utah Mammoth. They play their home games at the Tucson Convention Center.

In April 2016, the Arizona Coyotes announced they would relocate their AHL affiliate, the Springfield Falcons, to Tucson ahead of the 2016–17 season. Following the 2023–24 season, the Coyotes were deactivated by the NHL, and their operations were transferred to a new team in Utah. Owner Alex Meruelo was given a five-year window to reactivate the Coyotes if a new arena was secured, but he abandoned the plan after a land auction was canceled. The Roadrunners announced they would remain in Tucson as the AHL affiliate for the Mammoth, with Meruelo retaining his ownership of the Roadrunners.

== History ==
=== Arizona Coyotes affiliation ===
On April 19, 2016, the Arizona Coyotes announced that they had reached an agreement to purchase their AHL affiliate, the Springfield Falcons, and would relocate the team to Tucson for the 2016–17 season. Said purchase and relocation was contingent on three approvals; the first from Rio Nuevo (Tucson's downtown revitalization authority) to invest $3.2 million in arena upgrades to bring the Convention Center to professional-quality standards was approved on April 26, the second from the AHL Board of Governors to conditionally approve the purchase and relocation by the Coyotes was approved on May 10, and the third from the Tucson City Council for a 10-year lease with the Convention Center was approved on May 17.

A name-the-team contest was held between May 17 and May 31. The hockey club's new name and logo were revealed on June 18 during the Tucson Convention Center's open house event. The chosen name, Roadrunners, pays homage to the Phoenix Roadrunners, a team name that was used for various Phoenix professional hockey teams from 1967 to 2009, and creates a play on words with its parent club the Coyotes (a reference to the classic cartoon duo of Wile E. Coyote and the Road Runner). Its logo, as well, is a close match for the traditional logo used for Phoenix Roadrunners' teams of the past. On October 27, the day before their home opener, the Roadrunners unveiled their mascot, Dusty the Roadrunner. Dusty wears number 16 on his jersey, representing the year the Springfield Falcons relocated to Tucson in 2016.

On June 21, 2016, Mark Lamb was hired as the team's first head coach after holding the same position with the Western Hockey League's Swift Current Broncos since 2009. Mark Hardy was hired as an assistant coach. The team named its first president Brian Sandy, along with three other key staff members, on July 18. On July 20, the Roadrunners announced their first general manager, Doug Soetaert, promoted from his former position as a scout for the Coyotes.

The Roadrunners played their first-ever game on October 14, 2016, against the San Diego Gulls at Pechanga Arena, losing 5–3. Roadrunners' inaugural captain Craig Cunningham scored the team's first two goals in franchise history. The Roadrunners played their first home game two weeks later on October 28, winning by a score of 6–5 in front of 6,521 fans.

During a home game against the Manitoba Moose on November 19, 2016, Roadrunners player Craig Cunningham collapsed on the ice just before the opening faceoff. He was promptly transported to the hospital, where he was diagnosed with an acute cardiac arrest resulting from ventricular fibrillation, a condition that caused his heart to stop beating. The arena's medical team, in addition to the staff at St. Mary's Hospital and Banner-University Medical Center, worked continuously for 85 minutes to administer CPR and ultimately succeeded in saving his life. On October 27, 2017, the Roadrunners retired Cunningham's No. 14 jersey during a pregame ceremony.

After one season, Lamb was released and replaced by Mike Van Ryn, the player development coach with the Coyotes. Under Van Ryn, the Roadrunners finished in first place in the Pacific Division but were eliminated by the Texas Stars in the division finals of the 2018 Calder Cup playoffs. Van Ryn then left to pursue other coaching opportunities and was hired by the St. Louis Blues. The Coyotes then hired Jay Varady as head coach of the Roadrunners for the 2018–19 season after a successful season as coach of the Kingston Frontenacs.

On May 12, 2020, the AHL announced the cancelation for the remainder of the 2019–20 season due to the COVID-19 pandemic. The Roadrunners were awarded the Pacific division title for having the best record in the division when play was suspended and later canceled. Prior to the postponed start of the 2020–21 season, head coach Varady joined the Coyotes' staff as an assistant coach and assistant Steve Potvin was promoted to head coach of the Roadrunners. Varady returned to the Roadrunners as head coach before the 2021–22 season. Following the season, Varady departed for the Detroit Red Wings as an assistant coach, with Potvin being renamed as head coach for the 2022–23 season.

In the 2022–23 season, Roadrunners forward Michael Carcone led the AHL in total scoring with 31 goals, 54 assists, and 85 total points in 65 games played, winning the John B. Sollenberger Trophy. Carcone also set franchise records in goals, assists, points, power-play goals (14), and shots on goal (273), while earning his first career AHL All-Star selection and being named to the AHL First All-Star Team at the end of the season. The Roadrunners also saw the professional debut of forward Josh Doan, joining the team in March 2023 following his sophomore season with the Arizona State Sun Devils. Doan debuted with Tucson on March 17 and scored his first pro goal two games later on March 21. The Roadrunners qualified for the 2023 Calder Cup playoffs, marking their first appearance since 2018. In the first round, they faced the Coachella Valley Firebirds, where they lost in a win-or-go-home game 3.

In the 2023–24 season, the Roadrunners had rookie Josh Doan and goalie Matthew Villalta represent them for the 2024 AHL All-Star Game. Doan finished the regular season with 26 goals and 20 assists for 46 points in 62 games, as his 26 goals ranked first on the Roadrunners along with all rookies in the AHL, while Villalta led the AHL with 31 wins. The Roadrunners finished the regular season with a 43–23–4–2 record and finished second in the AHL's Pacific Division, with their 43 wins marking the most in a single season for the Roadrunners; which helped them clinch home-ice advantage for the first round of the 2024 Calder Cup playoffs and bring home playoff games to Tucson for the first time since 2018. However, Tucson was upset by the Calgary Wranglers in the first round, losing the first two games in a best-of-three series.

=== Utah Mammoth affiliation ===
Following concerns about an indefinite timeframe on a new arena and the effects of continued play at the 4,600-seat Mullett Arena in Tempe, the NHL facilitated the sale of the Coyotes franchise to Utah-based billionaire Ryan Smith on April 18, 2024, after the NHL Board of Governors voted to establish a team in Utah using the Coyotes' hockey assets; however, rather than formally relocate, the Coyotes franchise was instead marked "inactive", with Utah considered a hybrid (due to transfer of assets) expansion team. Coyotes owner Alex Meruelo retained his rights to the Roadrunners, confirming that they would continue as the AHL affiliate for the Utah Hockey Club (later renamed the Utah Mammoth), and initially announced his intention to move the Roadrunners from Tucson to Mullett Arena (either part-time or full-time) before rescinding those comments the next day, stating that he "spoke too soon". The lease agreement with Mullett Arena is specifically for an NHL team, and any adjustments to the lease agreement with the ASU-owned arena would need to be approved by the Arizona Board of Regents. Furthermore, Tucson city officials received no communication from Meruelo on the intended move, nor did the Roadrunners franchise.

On May 28, 2024, the Roadrunners initially announced that they would play six of its 36 home games during the 2024–25 season at Mullett Arena, but later announced they would play all 36 of their home games in Tucson, following the decision by the Arizona State Land Department to cancel their June 27 land auction. The city of Tucson and the Roadrunners also agreed on an amended license agreement to keep the team in Tucson through the 2026–27 season, adding a year upon their original ten-year lease at the Tucson Convention Center. However, following the decision by Alex Meruelo to walk away from his Coyotes ownership, reports emerged that once a new arena for the Meruelo-owned Grand Sierra Resort in Reno, Nevada was ready (with an expected completion date of 2027), the Roadrunners could potentially be relocated there.

Before the start of its tenth season in 2025, the Roadrunners unveiled a new uniforms that promoted their Kachina-inspired alternate logo similar to the one used by the Coyotes to a full-time look. Prior to that, their primary look was more reminiscent of the look used by the World Hockey Association's Phoenix Roadrunners.

== Rivalries ==
The Roadrunners consider the San Diego Gulls, the AHL affiliate of the Anaheim Ducks, as their primary rival and refer to them as their "I-8 Border Rival". Additionally, the winner of each season's series between the two teams is presented with the "I-8 Border Cup Trophy", which has been in the possession of the Roadrunners since the 2018–19 season. As of the 2025–26 season, the two teams have faced each other 88 times during the regular season, which is the highest number of games that the Roadrunners have played against any opponent. The Roadrunners current record against the Gulls is 46–37–4–1, with the Roadrunners losing the 2025–26 season series 3–3–2–0.

== Season-by-season results ==
| Regular season | | | | | | | | | | | Playoffs | | | | | |
| Season | Games | Won | Lost | OTL | SOL | Points | PCT | Goals for | Goals against | Standing | Year | First Round | Division Semifinals | Division Finals | Conference Finals | Calder Cup Finals |
|---|---|---|---|---|---|---|---|---|---|---|---|---|---|---|---|---|
| 2016–17 | 68 | 29 | 31 | 8 | 0 | 66 | .485 | 187 | 237 | 6th, Pacific | 2017 | Did not qualify | | | | |
| 2017–18 | 68 | 42 | 20 | 5 | 1 | 90 | .662 | 214 | 173 | 1st, Pacific | 2018 | — | W, 3–1, SJ | L, 1–4, TEX | — | — |
| 2018–19 | 68 | 34 | 26 | 5 | 3 | 76 | .559 | 206 | 202 | 5th, Pacific | 2019 | Did not qualify | | | | |
| 2019–20 | 58 | 36 | 19 | 1 | 2 | 75 | .647 | 198 | 163 | 1st, Pacific | ~~2020~~ | Season cancelled due to the COVID-19 pandemic | | | | |
| 2020–21 | 36 | 13 | 20 | 3 | 0 | 29 | .403 | 103 | 126 | 7th, Pacific | 2021 (Note: The 2021 Calder Cup playoffs were not held; the Pacific Division held a postseason tournament for the division title. The bottom four teams had single-elimination play-in games to qualify for the semifinals (the first two rounds). The division semifinals and finals were best-of-three for the John D. Chick Trophy (the last two rounds).) | — | L, 1–2, SJ | — | — | — |
| 2021–22 | 68 | 23 | 39 | 5 | 1 | 52 | .382 | 182 | 268 | 8th, Pacific | 2022 | Did not qualify | | | | |
| 2022–23 | 72 | 30 | 33 | 8 | 1 | 69 | .479 | 219 | 245 | 7th, Pacific | 2023 | L, 1–2, CV | — | — | — | — |
| 2023–24 | 72 | 43 | 23 | 4 | 2 | 92 | .639 | 222 | 214 | 2nd, Pacific | 2024 | L, 0–2, CGY | — | — | — | — |
| 2024–25 | 72 | 34 | 32 | 4 | 2 | 74 | .514 | 228 | 237 | 7th, Pacific | 2025 | L, 1–2, ABB | — | — | — | — |
| 2025–26 | 72 | 34 | 28 | 10 | 0 | 78 | .542 | 230 | 239 | 8th, Pacific | 2026 | Did not qualify | | | | |

== Players ==
=== Current roster ===
Updated October 22, 2026.

| No. | Nat | Player | Pos | S/G | Age | Acquired | Birthplace | Contract |
|---|---|---|---|---|---|---|---|---|
| 12 | (Canada) | Owen Allard | C | L | 22 | 2025 | Renfrew, Ontario | Mammoth |
| 55 | (Austria) | Gregor Biber | D | L | 20 | 2026 | Krems, Austria | Mammoth |
| 67 | (Belarus) | Yegor Borikov | LW | L | 21 | 2026 | Luksky, Belarus | Mammoth |
| 18 | (Canada) | Caleb Desnoyers | C | L | 19 | 2026 | Saint-Hyacinthe, Quebec | Mammoth |
| 39 | (Canada) | Cameron Hebig | C | R | 29 | 2021 | Saskatoon, Saskatchewan | Mammoth |
| 4 | (United States) | Brandon Holt | D | L | 25 | 2026 | Grand Forks, North Dakota | Roadrunners |
| 35 | (Czech Republic) | Michael Hrabal | G | L | 21 | 2026 | Praha, Czech Republic | Mammoth |
| 77 | (Canada) | Tij Iginla | LW | L | 20 | 2026 | Lake Country, British Columbia | Mammoth |
| 6 | (United States) | Zac Jones | D | L | 26 | 2026 | Richmond, Virginia | Mammoth |
| 3 | (Canada) | Tomas Lavoie | D | R | 20 | 2026 | Repentigny, Quebec | Mammoth |
| 43 | (Germany) | Julian Lutz | F | L | 22 | 2024 | Weingarten, Germany | Mammoth |
| 22 | (Canada) | Ben McCartney (A) | LW | L | 25 | 2021 | Macdonald, Manitoba | Mammoth |
| 13 | (Belarus) | Vadim Moroz | RW | R | 22 | 2026 | Minsk, Belarus | Mammoth |
| 79 | (Canada) | Montana Onyebuchi | D | R | 26 | 2023 | Dugald, Manitoba | Mammoth |
| 27 | (United States) | Austin Poganski (C) | RW | R | 30 | 2023 | St. Cloud, Minnesota | Roadrunners |
| 15 | (Canada) | Jack Ricketts | F | L | 27 | 2025 | Oakville, Ontario | Roadrunners |
| 21 | (United States) | Kevin Rooney (A) | C | L | 33 | 2025 | Canton, Massachusetts | Roadrunners |
| 90 | (Canada) | Joshua Roy | LW | L | 23 | 2026 | Saint-Georges-de-Beauce, Quebec | Mammoth |
| 5 | (United States) | Robbie Russo | D | R | 33 | 2024 | Westmont, Illinois | Roadrunners |
| 9 | (Canada) | Gabe Smith | C | L | 20 | 2026 | St. Andrews, New Brunswick | Mammoth |
| 30 | (United States) | Jaxson Stauber | G | L | 27 | 2024 | Wayzata, Minnesota | Mammoth |
| 23 | (Canada) | Brandon Tanev | LW | L | 34 | 2026 | Toronto, Ontario | Mammoth |
| 42 | (United States) | Cal Thomas | D | L | 23 | 2026 | Maple Grove, Minnesota | Roadrunners |
| 17 | (Canada) | Ty Tullio | RW | R | 24 | 2025 | Detroit, Michigan | Roadrunners |
| 25 | (United States) | Sammy Walker | C | R | 27 | 2025 | Edina, Minnesota | Roadrunners |

=== Team captains ===
- Craig Cunningham, 2016
- Andrew Campbell, 2017–2018
- Dakota Mermis, 2018–2019
- Michael Chaput, 2019–2020
- Dysin Mayo, 2021
- Hudson Fasching, 2022
- Adam Cracknell, 2022–2023
- Steven Kampfer, 2023–2024
- Austin Poganski, 2024–present

=== American Hockey League Hall of Famers ===
AHL Hall of Fame Honored Members
| Name | Seasons | Induction Year |
|---|---|---|
| John Slaney | 2017- (asst. coach) | 2014 |

=== Retired numbers ===
Tucson Roadrunners retired numbers
| No. | Player | Position | Career | No. retirement |
|---|---|---|---|---|
| 14 | Craig Cunningham | C | 2016 | October 27, 2017 |

=== Notable alumni ===
The following players have played at least 50 games for Tucson and 100 games in the National Hockey League:

- (United States) Beau Bennett
- (Canada) Michael Bunting
- (Canada) Kyle Capobianco
- (Canada) Michael Carcone
- (Canada) Michael Chaput
- (Canada) Kevin Connauton
- (Canada) Adam Cracknell
- (Canada) Lawson Crouse
- (United States) Josh Doan
- (United States) Ty Emberson
- (United States) Hudson Fasching
- (United States) Christian Fischer
- (United States) Conor Garland
- (Canada) Joel Hanley
- (Canada) Adin Hill
- (United States) Steven Kampfer
- (Canada) Jamie McBain
- (United States) Scott Perunovich
- (Canada) Dylan Strome
- (United States) Jarred Tinordi
- (United States) Kailer Yamamoto

=== Head coaches ===
- Mark Lamb, 2016–2017
- Mike Van Ryn, 2017–2018
- Jay Varady, 2018–2020, 2021–2022
- Steve Potvin, 2020–2021, 2022–present

== Team records and leaders ==
Figures are updated as of the conclusion of the 2025–26 season.

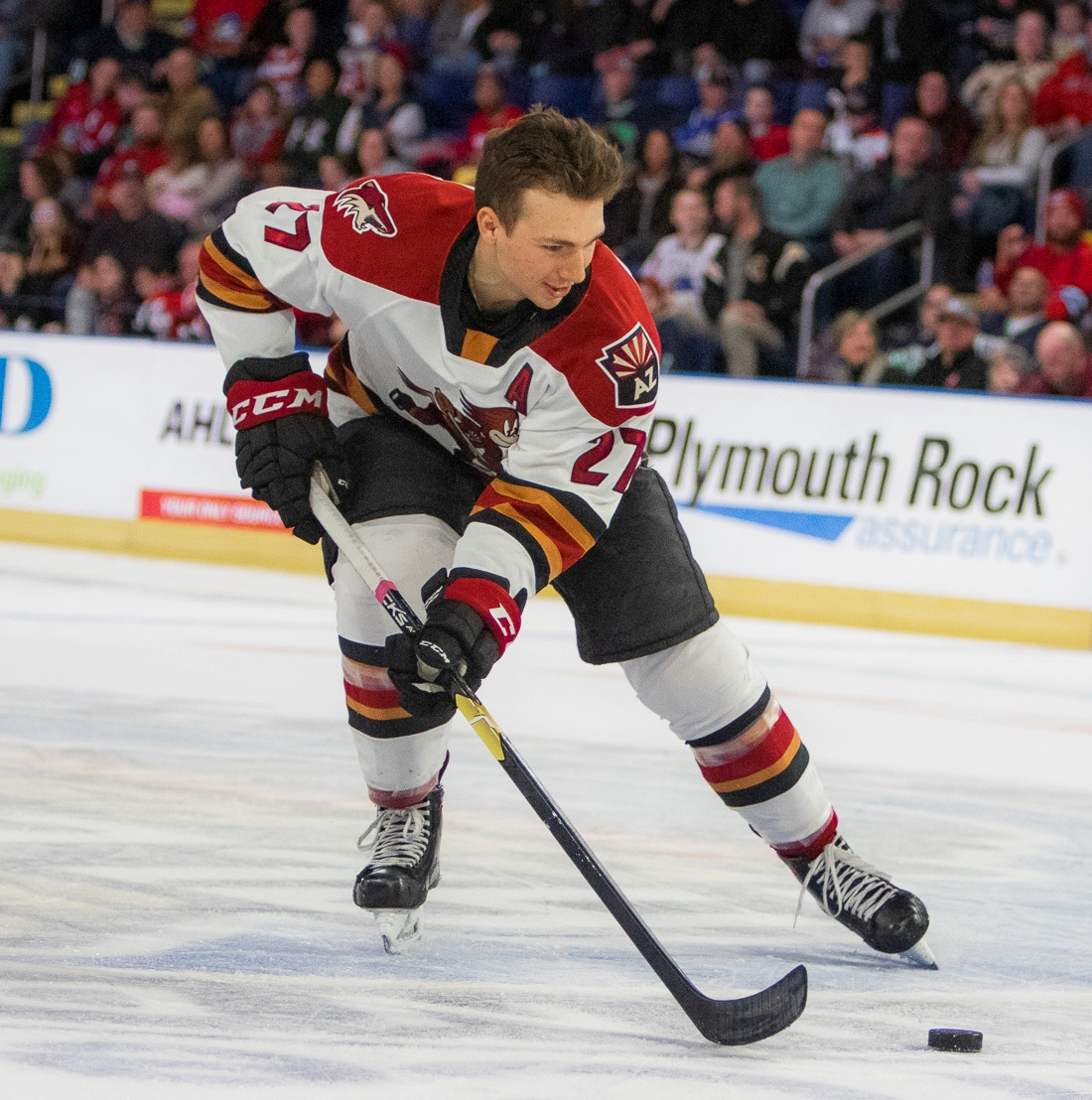
Michael Bunting spent five seasons with the Roadrunners from 2016 to 2021, departing as the franchise's all-time leader in goals, assists, and points.

=== Scoring leaders ===
These are the top-ten point-scorers for the Tucson Roadrunners in the AHL.

Note: Pos = Position; GP = Games played; G = Goals; A = Assists; Pts = Points; P/G = Points per game; = current Roadrunners player

Points
| Player | Pos | GP | G | A | Pts | P/G |
|---|---|---|---|---|---|---|
| Cameron Hebig | C | 357 | 88 | 99 | 187 | .52 |
| Michael Bunting | LW | 260 | 74 | 106 | 180 | .69 |
| Ben McCartney | LW | 274 | 69 | 92 | 161 | .59 |
| Michael Carcone | LW | 148 | 70 | 81 | 151 | 1.02 |
| Austin Poganski | RW | 204 | 52 | 76 | 128 | .63 |
| Lane Pederson | C | 183 | 58 | 66 | 124 | .68 |
| Jan Jenik | C | 165 | 46 | 74 | 120 | .73 |
| Kyle Capobianco | D | 155 | 21 | 91 | 112 | .72 |
| Robbie Russo | D | 251 | 17 | 92 | 109 | .43 |
| Hudson Fasching | RW | 174 | 49 | 57 | 106 | .61 |

=== Franchise leaders ===
==== Single season ====
| Type | Number | Player | Season | Ref |
|---|---|---|---|---|
| Goals | 31 | Michael Carcone | 2022–23 | |
| Assists | 54 | Michael Carcone | 2022–23 | |
| Points | 85 | Michael Carcone | 2022–23 | |
| Penalty minutes | 178 | Bokondji Imama | 2021–22 | |
| Power play goals | 14 | Michael Carcone | 2022–23 | |
| Short-handed goals | 3 | Laurent Dauphin / Jeremy Gregoire / Ben McCartney | 2016–17 / 2019–20 / 2024–25 | |
| Game winning goals | 8 | Josh Doan | 2023–24 | |
| Plus–minus | +30 | Joel Hanley | 2017–18 | |
| Wins | 31 | Matthew Villalta | 2023–24 | |
| Shutouts | 5 | Adin Hill | 2017–18 | |

==== Career ====
| Type | Number | Player | Ref |
|---|---|---|---|
| Games played | 357 | Cameron Hebig | |
| Goals | 88 | Cameron Hebig | |
| Assists | 106 | Michael Bunting | |
| Points | 187 | Cameron Hebig | |
| Penalty minutes | 384 | Curtis Douglas | |
| Power play goals | 28 | Michael Carcone | |
| Short-handed goals | 5 | Hudson Fasching / Ben McCartney | |
| Game-winning goals | 11 | Michael Bunting | |
| Plus-minus | +30 | Joel Hanley | |
| Wins | 66 | Adin Hill | |
| Shutouts | 10 | Adin Hill | |
