= Phoenix Roadrunners =

Phoenix Roadrunners has been the name of several ice hockey teams in Phoenix, Arizona:

- Phoenix Roadrunners (WHL), a defunct ice hockey team in the minor pro Western Hockey League (1967–1974)
- Phoenix Roadrunners (WHA), a defunct ice hockey team in the World Hockey Association (1974–1977)
- Phoenix Roadrunners (CHL), a defunct ice hockey team in the Central Hockey League (1977)
- Phoenix Roadrunners (PHL), a defunct ice hockey team in the Pacific Hockey League (1977–1979)
- Phoenix Roadrunners (IHL), a defunct ice hockey team in the International Hockey League (1989–1997)
- Phoenix Roadrunners (ECHL), a defunct ice hockey team in the ECHL (2005–2009)

== See also ==
- Roadrunner (disambiguation)
