= Krems =

Krems may refer to:

- Krems an der Donau, a city in Lower Austria
- Krems, Carinthia, a small municipality in the district of Spittal an der Drau in Carinthia in Austria
- Two rivers in Austria:
  - Krems (Lower Austria)
  - Krems (Upper Austria)
- Krems II, a municipality in the district of Segeberg in Schleswig-Holstein, Germany

== See also ==
- Kremsmünster
- Kremser SC, association football club based in Krems an der Donau
