= Road Runner Express =

Road Runner Express may refer to:

- Road Runner Express (Six Flags Fiesta Texas)
- Road Runner Express (Six Flags Magic Mountain)

It may also refer to these roller coasters formerly known as Road Runner Express:

- Beaver Land Mine Ride at Geauga Lake
- Frankie's Mine Train at Six Flags Great Escape and at Frontier City
- Gotham City Gauntlet: Escape from Arkham Asylum at Six Flags New England
- Rattle Snake at Walibi Holland
