= 2021–22 AHL season =

- League: American Hockey League
- Sport: Ice hockey
- Duration: October 15, 2021 – April 30, 2022

Regular season
- Macgregor Kilpatrick Trophy: Chicago Wolves
- Season MVP: T. J. Tynan (Ontario Reign)
- Top scorer: Andrew Poturalski (Chicago Wolves)

Playoffs
- Playoffs MVP: Josh Leivo (Chicago)

Calder Cup
- Champions: Chicago Wolves
- Runners-up: Springfield Thunderbirds

AHL seasons
- 2020–21 2022–23

The 2021–22 AHL season was the 86th season of the American Hockey League. The regular season began on October 15, 2021, and ended on April 30, 2022. The regular season was followed by the Calder Cup playoffs, which had not been held since 2019 due to the onset of the COVID-19 pandemic. The playoffs began on May 2, 2022, and ended on June 25, 2022, with the Chicago Wolves winning their third Calder Cup.

== League changes ==
Due to the then-ongoing COVID-19 pandemic during the previous season, the league had a temporary alignment consisting of five divisions. The league's Canada-based teams only played intradivisional games and could not cross the international border due to pandemic travel restrictions. The league expected to return to a normal schedule and with an updated alignment following team relocations, teams returning, and the lightening of pandemic restrictions. The new alignment was announced on June 7, 2021, returning to the previous four divisions used in 2019–20 with the exception of the Abbotsford Canucks and the Henderson Silver Knights joining the Pacific Division, increasing it to nine teams, while the Binghamton Devils and the former San Antonio Rampage were removed from the North and Central Divisions, respectively, decreasing each to seven teams.

As part of the alignment, the league would continue to have an imbalanced schedule with each team either playing 76, 72, or 68 games during the regular season. The Macgregor Kilpatrick Trophy for the regular season champion was still awarded based on points percentage. The league planned for this to be the last season with the imbalanced scheduling with the expectation that all teams will play a 72-game schedule in 2022–23.

On October 11, 2021, the league announced it had added female officials, seven referees and three linespeople, to its officiating crew for the first time.

On January 1, 2022, the league announced it had extended the regular season by six days, from ending on April 24 to ending April 30, citing COVID-related game postponements.

=== Team and NHL affiliation changes ===
The league returned to 31 active teams with the Charlotte Checkers, Milwaukee Admirals, and Springfield Thunderbirds returning from a pandemic-related hiatus.

- The Binghamton Devils' franchise was relocated to Utica, New York, as the Utica Comets. The Comets adopted a color scheme of red, black, and white, to match the colors of the Devils.
- The Bridgeport Sound Tigers were rebranded as the Bridgeport Islanders by their parent club, the New York Islanders.
- The franchise that was operating as the Utica Comets, and owned by the Vancouver Canucks, was relocated to Abbotsford, British Columbia, as the Abbotsford Canucks.

==== Affiliation changes ====
Due to the three teams returning from their pandemic hiatus, the temporary secondary NHL affiliations from the previous season ended. However, the addition of a 32nd NHL team in Seattle added one dual affiliation.

AHL team	New affiliate (Note: Or an affiliate returning as a primary affiliate after the AHL team returned from pandemic-related hiatus.)	Previous affiliate
Abbotsford Canucks (Note: Affiliation change from the franchise's time as the Utica Comets.)		St. Louis Blues (Note: Temporary secondary affiliate during pandemic affected season.)
Charlotte Checkers	Florida Panthers (Note: Returned as the team's primary NHL affiliate after team hiatus.); Seattle Kraken (Note: One season dual affiliation before the Kraken launched the Coachella Valley Firebirds in 2022.)	Team was on hiatus
Chicago Wolves		Nashville Predators
Milwaukee Admirals	Nashville Predators	Team was on hiatus
Springfield Thunderbirds	St. Louis Blues	Team was on hiatus
Syracuse Crunch		Florida Panthers

=== Coaching changes ===
Off–season
Team	2020–21 coach	2021–22 coach	Notes
Abbotsford Canucks	—	Trent Cull	Cull had coached the Canucks' previous affiliate, the Utica Comets, since 2017 and led the team to a 122–93–17–9 record. He was brought over by the Canucks when the team was relocated.
Hershey Bears	Spencer Carbery	Scott Allen	On July 17, 2021, Carbery was hired as an assistant coach by the Toronto Maple Leafs. Carbery compiled an 87–50–9–8 record in three seasons as Bears head coach. Carbery also won the Louis A. R. Pieri Memorial Award in the 2020–21 AHL season as the league's best head coach, and led the Bears to a Macgregor Kilpatrick Trophy, with the best team record during the season. Allen was promoted to head coach from his previous role as assistant on August 5, 2021.
Laval Rocket	Joel Bouchard	Jean-Francois Houle	Bouchard left the Rocket at the end of his contract, compiling an 83–67–24 record over three seasons, to become the head coach of the San Diego Gulls. The Rocket then hired Houle after he served six seasons working for the Edmonton Oilers as an assistant coach with the Bakersfield Condors.
Lehigh Valley Phantoms	Scott Gordon	Ian Laperriere	The Philadelphia Flyers announced that Gordon and the Flyers' organization had mutually agreed to end their contract following the 2020–21 season. Gordon had led the Phantoms as head coach for six seasons and a 186–121–40 record (and one tie due to a suspended game in 2021) as well as a stint as interim head coach of the Flyers with a 25–22–4 record in 2018–19. On June 5, 2021, Flyers' assistant coach Ian Laperriere was named the head coach of the Phantoms.
Manitoba Moose	Pascal Vincent	Mark Morrison	Vincent stepped down from his position with the Moose to join the Columbus Blue Jackets coaching staff on June 24, 2021. Vincent compiled a 155–139–31 record in 325 games as head coach with Manitoba. Morrison was hired on July 19 after serving as an assistant coach with the Anaheim Ducks since 2017. He had also previously worked for the Winnipeg Jets as an assistant coach for their AHL affiliates, the St. John's IceCaps and the Moose, from 2011 to 2017.
Providence Bruins	Jay Leach	Ryan Mougenel	Leach was hired as an assistant coach with the Seattle Kraken on July 5, 2021. Leach compiled a 136–77–26 record in 239 games as head coach of Providence. Ryan Mougenel was promoted from his assistant coaching position on August 13, 2021.
San Diego Gulls	Kevin Dineen	Joel Bouchard	Dineen's contract was not renewed after two seasons, leading the Gulls to a 56–36–7–2 record, and was replaced by Bouchard.
Stockton Heat	Cail MacLean	Mitch Love	The Calgary Flames promoted MacLean to assistant coach with the Flames after serving as the Heat's head coach for three seasons and a 72–65–16 record. Love was named the next head coach on July 12, 2021, after most recently coaching the Saskatoon Blades.
Tucson Roadrunners	Steve Potvin	Jay Varady	Prior to the postponed start of the previous season, Roadrunners' head coach Jay Varady was brought up to the Arizona Coyotes' staff as an assistant coach and Roadrunners' assistant coach Steve Potvin was promoted as the head coach. Varady returned to his position with the Roadrunners for the 2021–22 season.
Utica Comets	Trent Cull	Kevin Dineen	Cull was retained by the Vancouver Canucks and brought over to their Abbotsford affiliate. Dineen was hired on August 5, 2021.
In-season
Team	Outgoing coach	Incoming coach	Notes
Bakersfield Condors	Jay Woodcroft	Colin Chaulk (interim)	On February 10, 2022, Woodcroft was promoted to Edmonton following the firing of Oilers' head coach Dave Tippett. Condors' assistant coach Chaulk was named the interim head coach the following day.
Rockford IceHogs	Derek King	Anders Sorensen (interim)	On November 6, 2021, King was promoted to Chicago following the firing of Blackhawks head coach Jeremy Colliton.
Ontario Reign	John Wroblewski	Chris Hajt (interim); Craig Johnson (interim)	After taking time away from the Reign on a personal leave of absence, it was mutually determined on March 11, 2022, between the Reign and Wroblewski that Wroblewski would not return as head coach of the Reign.

== Final standings ==
y– indicates team clinched division and a playoff spot
x– indicates team clinched a playoff spot
e– indicates team was eliminated from playoff contention

Final standings as of April 30, 2022

=== Eastern Conference ===
Atlantic Division	GP	W	L	OTL	SOL	Pts	Pts%	GF	GA
y–Charlotte Checkers (FLA/SEA)	72	42	24	5	1	90	.625	234	197
x–Springfield Thunderbirds (STL)	76	43	24	6	3	95	.625	233	221
x–Providence Bruins (BOS)	72	36	25	5	6	83	.576	199	192
x–Wilkes-Barre/Scranton Penguins (PIT)	76	35	33	4	4	78	.513	209	225
x–Hershey Bears (WSH)	76	34	32	6	4	78	.513	202	209
x–Bridgeport Islanders (NYI)	72	31	30	7	4	73	.507	213	226
e–Hartford Wolf Pack (NYR)	72	32	32	6	2	72	.500	205	225
e–Lehigh Valley Phantoms (PHI)	76	29	32	10	5	73	.480	195	239

North Division	GP	W	L	OTL	SOL	Pts	Pts%	GF	GA
y–Utica Comets (NJD)	72	43	20	8	1	95	.660	246	206
x–Syracuse Crunch (TBL)	76	41	26	7	2	91	.599	242	229
x–Laval Rocket (MTL)	72	39	26	5	2	85	.590	246	231
x–Belleville Senators (OTT)	72	40	28	4	0	84	.583	219	218
x–Rochester Americans (BUF)	76	37	29	7	3	84	.553	254	270
e–Toronto Marlies (TOR)	72	37	30	4	1	79	.549	243	244
e–Cleveland Monsters (CBJ)	76	28	35	8	5	69	.454	207	262

=== Western Conference ===
Central Division	GP	W	L	OTL	SOL	Pts	Pts%	GF	GA
y–Chicago Wolves (CAR)	76	50	16	5	5	110	.724	261	194
x–Manitoba Moose (WPG)	72	41	24	5	2	89	.618	228	204
x–Milwaukee Admirals (NSH)	76	39	28	5	4	87	.572	229	228
x–Rockford IceHogs (CHI)	72	37	30	4	1	79	.549	223	221
x–Texas Stars (DAL)	72	32	28	6	6	76	.528	219	230
e–Iowa Wild (MIN)	72	32	31	4	5	73	.507	202	209
e–Grand Rapids Griffins (DET)	76	33	35	6	2	74	.487	209	240

Pacific Division	GP	W	L	OTL	SOL	Pts	Pts%	GF	GA
y–Stockton Heat (CGY)	68	45	16	5	2	97	.713	242	185
x–Ontario Reign (LAK)	68	41	18	5	4	91	.669	259	219
x–Colorado Eagles (COL)	68	39	22	4	3	85	.625	244	207
x–Bakersfield Condors (EDM)	68	37	21	5	5	84	.618	225	192
x–Abbotsford Canucks (VAN)	68	39	23	5	1	84	.618	230	200
x–Henderson Silver Knights (VGK)	68	35	28	4	1	75	.551	209	203
x–San Diego Gulls (ANA)	68	28	33	4	3	63	.463	197	223
e–Tucson Roadrunners (ARI)	68	23	39	5	1	52	.382	182	268
e–San Jose Barracuda (SJS)	68	20	42	4	2	46	.338	202	291

== Statistical leaders ==
=== Leading skaters ===
The following players are sorted by points, then goals. Final as of April 30, 2022.

GP = Games played; G = Goals; A = Assists; Pts = Points; +/– = P Plus–minus; PIM = Penalty minutes

Player	Team	GP	G	A	Pts	PIM
Andrew Poturalski	Chicago Wolves	71	28	73	101	36
T. J. Tynan	Ontario Reign	62	14	84	98	18
Stefan Noesen	Chicago Wolves	70	48	37	85	112
Seth Griffith	Bakersfield Condors	64	30	50	80	54
Kiefer Sherwood	Colorado Eagles	57	36	39	75	34
Martin Frk	Ontario Reign	58	40	33	73	73
Dylan Sikura	Colorado Eagles	60	33	40	73	16
Sheldon Rempal	Abbotsford Canucks	55	33	36	69	46
Matthew Phillips	Stockton Heat	65	31	37	68	16
JJ Peterka	Rochester Americans	70	28	40	68	28

=== Leading goaltenders ===
The following goaltenders with a minimum 1,380 minutes played lead the league in goals against average. Final as of April 30, 2022.

GP = Games played; TOI = Time on ice (in minutes); SA = Shots against; GA = Goals against; SO = Shutouts; GAA = Goals against average; SV% = Save percentage; W = Wins; L = Losses; OT = Overtime/shootout loss

Player	Team	GP	TOI	SA	GA	SO	GAA	SV%	W	L	OT
Troy Grosenick	Providence Bruins	30	1,650:38	821	55	3	2.00	.933	16	6	4
Alex Lyon	Chicago Wolves	30	1,665:16	678	60	3	2.16	.912	18	7	3
Charlie Lindgren	Springfield Thunderbirds	34	1,979:19	972	73	3	2.21	.925	24	7	1
Stuart Skinner	Bakersfield Condors	35	2,088:10	963	77	5	2.21	.920	22	7	5
Joey Daccord	Charlotte Checkers	34	1,917:49	970	73	0	2.28	.925	19	11	2

== Calder Cup playoffs ==
=== Playoff format ===
Following two seasons of not awarding the Calder Cup due to the COVID-19 pandemic, the 2022 Calder Cup playoffs format was completely revamped from the previous version format of the 2019 playoffs by expanding from 16 teams to 23 teams that qualify for the postseason. During the regular season, teams receive two points for a win and one point for an overtime or shootout loss with teams in each division ranked by points percentage (points earned divided by points available). At the conclusion of the regular season, all but the bottom two teams in each division qualify for the playoffs: six in the Atlantic, five in the North, five in the Central, and seven in the Pacific. The first round is organized so that four teams per division remain to play in the divisional semifinals.

The 2022 playoffs continued to feature a divisional playoff format, leading to the conference finals and ultimately the Calder Cup finals. The first round was a best-of-three series, followed by division semifinals and finals as best-of-five series, and the conference finals and Calder Cup finals were a best-of-seven. The top two teams in the Atlantic, top three teams in each of the North and Central, and the first-place team in the Pacific Division received byes into the division semifinals.

=== Bracket ===
First round
A3	Providence	0
A6	Bridgeport	2
A4	Wilkes-Barre/Scranton	2
A5	Hershey	1
N4	Belleville	0
N5	Rochester	2
C4	Rockford	2
C5	Texas	0
P4	Bakersfield	2
P5	Abbotsford	0
P2	Ontario	2
P7	San Diego	0
P3	Colorado	2
P6	Henderson	0

Division semifinals
A1	Charlotte	3
A6	Bridgeport	1
Atlantic Division
A2	Springfield	3
A4	Wilkes-Barre/Scranton	0
N1	Utica	2
N5	Rochester	3
North Division
N2	Syracuse	2
N3	Laval	3
C1	Chicago	3
C4	Rockford	0
Central Division
C2	Manitoba	2
C3	Milwaukee	3
P1	Stockton	3
P4	Bakersfield	0
Pacific Division
P2	Ontario	0
P3	Colorado	3

Division finals
A1	Charlotte	0
A2	Springfield	3
Eastern Conference
N5	Rochester	0
N3	Laval	3
C1	Chicago	3
C3	Milwaukee	1
Western Conference
P1	Stockton	3
P3	Colorado	1

Conference finals
A2	Springfield	4
N3	Laval	3
C1	Chicago	4
P1	Stockton	2

Calder Cup finals
A2	Springfield	1
C1	Chicago	4

== AHL awards ==
Award	Winner
Calder Cup	Chicago Wolves
Les Cunningham Award	T. J. Tynan, Ontario Reign
John B. Sollenberger Trophy	Andrew Poturalski, Chicago Wolves
Willie Marshall Award	Stefan Noesen, Chicago Wolves
Dudley "Red" Garrett Memorial Award	Jack Quinn, Rochester Americans
Eddie Shore Award	Jordan Gross, Colorado Eagles
Aldege "Baz" Bastien Memorial Award	Dustin Wolf, Stockton Heat
Harry "Hap" Holmes Memorial Award	Alex Lyon, Chicago Wolves
Louis A. R. Pieri Memorial Award	Mitch Love, Stockton Heat
Fred T. Hunt Memorial Award	Sam Anas, Springfield Thunderbirds
Yanick Dupre Memorial Award	Dakota Mermis, Iowa Wild
Jack A. Butterfield Trophy	Josh Leivo, Chicago Wolves
Richard F. Canning Trophy	Springfield Thunderbirds
Robert W. Clarke Trophy	Chicago Wolves
Macgregor Kilpatrick Trophy	Chicago Wolves
Frank Mathers Trophy (Eastern Conference regular season champions)	Utica Comets
Norman R. "Bud" Poile Trophy (Western Conference regular season champions)	Chicago Wolves
Emile Francis Trophy (Atlantic Division regular season champions)	Charlotte Checkers
F. G. "Teddy" Oke Trophy (North Division regular season champions)	Utica Comets
Sam Pollock Trophy (Central Division regular season champions)	Chicago Wolves
John D. Chick Trophy (Pacific Division regular season champions)	Stockton Heat
James C. Hendy Memorial Award	Jon Greenberg, Milwaukee Admirals
Thomas Ebright Memorial Award	Kevin MacDonald, Springfield Thunderbirds
James H. Ellery Memorial Awards	Scott Leber, Rockford IceHogs
Ken McKenzie Award	Gavin Riches, Colorado Eagles
Michael Condon Memorial Award	Brent Colby (linesperson)
President's Awards	Organization: Springfield Thunderbirds; Player: Stefan Noesen, Chicago Wolves

=== All-Star teams ===
First All-Star Team

- Dustin Wolf (G) – Stockton
- Jordan Gross (D) – Colorado
- Jordan Spence (D) – Ontario
- Stefan Noesen (F) – Chicago
- Andrew Poturalski (F) – Chicago
- T. J. Tynan (F) – Ontario

Second All-Star Team

- Troy Grosenick (G) – Providence
- Jake Christiansen (D) – Cleveland
- Joseph Duszak (D) – Toronto
- Martin Frk (F) – Ontario
- Seth Griffith (F) – Bakersfield
- Kiefer Sherwood (F) – Colorado

All-Rookie Team

- Dustin Wolf (G) – Stockton
- Jack Rathbone (D) – Abbotsford
- Jordan Spence (D) – Ontario
- Jakob Pelletier (F) – Stockton
- JJ Peterka (F) – Rochester
- Jack Quinn (F) – Rochester

== See also ==
- List of AHL seasons

Preceded by 2020–21	AHL seasons	Succeeded by 2022–23
