= Kurtis Foster =

Canadian ice hockey player, coach (born 1981)

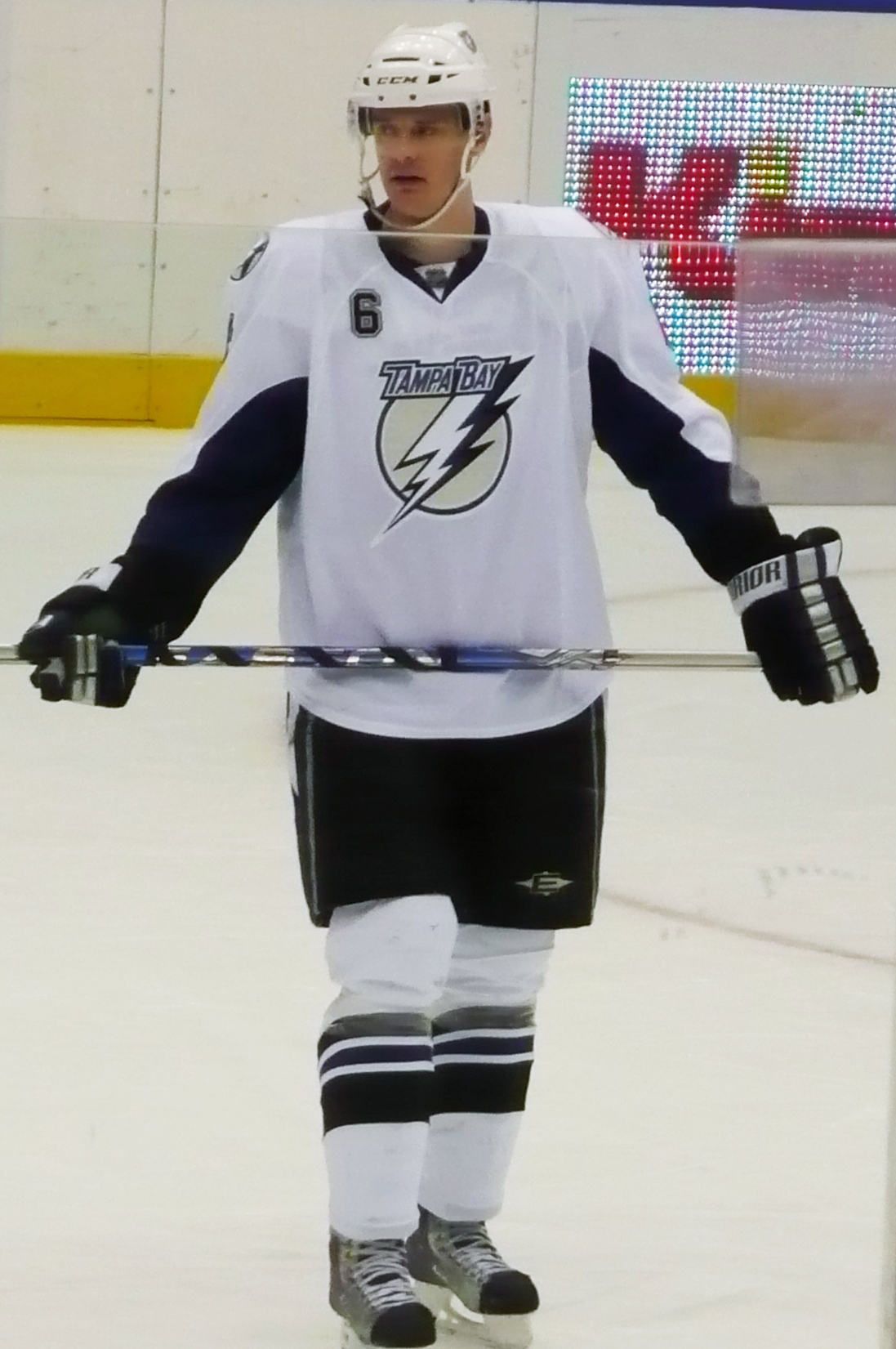
- Foster with the Tampa Bay Lightning in 2009
- Born: November 24, 1981 (age 44) Carp, Ontario, Canada
- Height: 6 ft 5 in (196 cm)
- Weight: 226 lb (103 kg; 16 st 2 lb)
- Position: Defence
- Shot: Right
- Played for: Atlanta Thrashers; Minnesota Wild; Tampa Bay Lightning; Edmonton Oilers; Anaheim Ducks; New Jersey Devils; Philadelphia Flyers; Tappara Tampere; KHL Medveščak Zagreb; Slovan Bratislava; Adler Mannheim; Thomas Sabo Ice Tigers
- NHL draft: 40th overall, 2000; Calgary Flames
- Playing career: 2001–2016

Kurtis Foster (born November 24, 1981) is a Canadian ice hockey coach and a former professional ice hockey defenceman. He played 408 career games in the National Hockey League (NHL).

== Playing career ==
=== Junior hockey ===
==== Peterborough Petes (1997–2002) ====
Foster was selected by the Peterborough Petes of the Ontario Hockey League (OHL) in the fourth round, 69th overall, in the 1997 OHL Priority Selection. He played his first junior game with the Petes against the Belleville Bulls on September 18, 1997, as he was held to no points in a 4–2 victory. On September 25, Foster scored his first career OHL goal against Curtis Cruickshank of the Kingston Frontenacs in an 8–5 loss. In 39 games with the Petes during his rookie season in the 1997–98 season, Foster scored 1 goal and 2 points in 39 games. In four playoff games, Foster was held to no points.

Foster saw more regular playing time with the Petes in the 1998–99 season, scoring 2 goals and 15 points in 54 games. In five playoff games, Foster did not record any points.

Foster appeared in all 68 games with Peterborough in the 1999–2000 season, as he recorded 6 goals and 24 points while earning 116 penalty minutes, the fourth highest total on the club. On April 2, 2000, Foster scored his first career OHL playoff goal, scoring against Corey Batten of the Belleville Bulls. Overall, in five playoff games, Foster had a goal and three points.

In the 2000–01 season, Foster had a breakout season offensively, scoring 17 goals and 41 points in 62 games. On September 21, he had his first career three-point game, earning three assists in a 5–3 win over the Oshawa Generals. On March 8, he scored his first career hat-trick, beating Generals goaltender T. J. Aceti three times in a 3–2 victory. In seven playoff games, Foster scored a goal and two points.

Foster appeared in 33 games with the Petes in the 2001–02 season, scoring 10 goals and 14 points before moving onto his professional career during the season.

=== Professional career ===
==== Calgary Flames (2000–2001) ====
Foster was selected by the Calgary Flames in the second round, 40th overall, at the 2000 NHL entry draft held at the Pengrowth Saddledome in Calgary.

On December 18, 2001, the Flames traded Foster and Jeff Cowan to the Atlanta Thrashers in exchange for Petr Buzek and the Thrashers' sixth-round pick in the 2004 NHL entry draft.

==== Atlanta Thrashers (2001–2004) ====
After being acquired by Atlanta, the team moved Foster (who was playing junior hockey at the time with Peterborough in OHL) to their American Hockey League (AHL) affiliate, the Chicago Wolves, for the remainder of the 2001–02 season. In 39 games with the Wolves, Foster scored 6 goals and 15 points, helping the club reach the playoffs. In the playoffs, Foster scored 1 goal and 2 points in 14 games, helping the Wolves win the Calder Cup.

Foster spent a majority of the 2002–03 season with the Wolves, where in 75 games, he scored 15 goals and 42 points, which were the highest total of any defenceman on the team. Foster also accumulated 159 penalty minutes, the second highest total on the team. In nine playoff games, he scored a goal and four points. He earned a brief call-up to the NHL with the Thrashers at the end of March. On March 31, he played in his first career NHL game, earning no points in a 4–3 victory over the New York Rangers. In two games with Atlanta, Foster had no points.

Foster again spent most of the 2003–04 season with the Wolves, as he scored 11 goals and 30 points in 67 games with Chicago. In ten playoff games, he earned three assists. He also appeared in three games with the Thrashers during the 2003–04 NHL season. On February 3, Foster earned his first career NHL point, an assist, in a 5–4 loss to the Boston Bruins. In three games with Atlanta, Foster had one assist. Following the season, Foster won the Yanick Dupre Memorial Award, awarded to the best AHL Player in the Community.

On June 26, 2004, Foster was traded to the Mighty Ducks of Anaheim in exchange for defenceman Niclas Hävelid.

==== Mighty Ducks of Anaheim (2004–2005) ====
With the 2004–05 NHL lock-out cancelling the entire 2004–05 NHL season, Foster spent the entire year with the Mighty Ducks' AHL affiliate, the Cincinnati Mighty Ducks for their 2004–05 AHL season. In 78 games with Cincinnati, he scored 17 goals and 42 points, helping the team reach the playoffs. His goals and points totals led all Cincinnati defencemen that season. In nine playoff games, he scored two goals and five points.

Following the season, Foster became a free agent.

==== Minnesota Wild (2005–2009) ====
On August 4, 2005, Foster signed a contract with the Minnesota Wild. He began the 2005–06 season with the Wild's AHL affiliate, the Houston Aeros. In 19 games with Houston, he scored 4 goals and 15 points, earning a promotion to Minnesota. Foster played in his first game with the Wild on November 19, 2005, where he scored his first two NHL goals against Tomáš Vokoun of the Nashville Predators in a 4–2 victory. In 58 games with Minnesota, Foster scored 10 goals and 28 points.

Foster returned to the Wild in 2006–07. In 57 games, Foster saw his offensive production drop to 3 goals and 23 points. On December 29, he earned his first career three-point game in the NHL, earning three assists in a 4–3 win over the Columbus Blue Jackets. On April 11, 2007, he played in his first Stanley Cup playoff game, earning an assist in a 2–1 loss to the Anaheim Ducks. In three playoff games, Foster earned two assists.

In the 2007–08 season, Foster played in 56 games with the Wild, scoring 7 goals and 19 points. On March 20, 2008, he suffered a broken left femur in a game against the San Jose Sharks. He suffered the injury when Sharks centre Torrey Mitchell checked Foster into the bottom of the boards while attempting to prevent an icing call. The hit, which resulted in a penalty, was later deemed accidental by the NHL. Foster had season-ending surgery to repair his broken left femur and missed the remainder of the season and the 2008 playoffs.

In light of Foster's injury, following the 2007–08 season, the NHL added the following to the rule regarding icing to protect both competitors as they raced for the puck:

Any contact between opposing players while pursuing the puck on an icing must be for the sole purpose of playing the puck and not for eliminating the opponent from playing the puck. Unnecessary or dangerous contact could result in penalties being assessed to the offending player.

Foster was not yet healthy for the beginning of the 2008–09 season, but on October 11, 2008, he announced he was skating with full equipment and felt no pain when skating. On February 9, 2009, he returned to play for the Aeros on a conditioning stint from the Wild. He played in a 6–3 win over the Chicago Wolves and registered two penalties in minutes. On March 7, 2009, he returned to the Minnesota lineup in a 4–3 loss to the Los Angeles Kings. He finished the season playing ten games with the Wild, scoring one goal and six points. After the season, Foster became a free agent.

==== Tampa Bay Lightning (2009–2010) ====
On July 8, 2009, Foster signed a one-year, $600,000 contract with the Tampa Bay Lightning. He played in his first game with the Lightning on October 3, 2009, in a 6–3 loss to the Atlanta Thrashers. Foster earned his first point as a member of the Lightning on November 21, an assist on a goal by Martin St. Louis in a 3–1 loss to the Carolina Hurricanes. The next game, on November 22, Foster scored his first goal with the Lightning, against Ondřej Pavelec of the Atlanta Thrashers in a 4–3 win. On November 27, Foster had his second NHL career two-goal game, scoring twice against Henrik Lundqvist of the New York Rangers in a 5–1 victory. In 71 games with Tampa Bay during the 2009–10 season, Foster scored eight goals and 34 assists for a career-high 42 points, although the Lightning failed to reach the 2010 playoffs. After the season, Foster was a Bill Masterton Memorial Trophy finalist with the award ultimately going to Jose Theodore of the Washington Capitals and Foster became a free agent.

==== Edmonton Oilers (2010–2011) ====
On July 1, 2010, Foster signed a two-year, $3.6 million contract with the Edmonton Oilers. He played his first game with Edmonton on October 7, 2010, in a 4–0 victory over the Calgary Flames. On October 21, he earned his first point as an Oiler, providing an assist on a goal by Aleš Hemský in a 4–2 loss to the Minnesota Wild. Five days later, on October 26, Foster scored his first goal with Edmonton, against Calgary's Miikka Kiprusoff in a 5–4 loss.

In his ongoing effort to get the NHL to change its icing rule, on February 3, 2011, Foster told TSN that there were complications during his surgery to repair his broken femur. Foster bled out and was in danger of losing his leg and could have died. A surgery that typically takes three hours took close to eight hours to complete. Foster wondered aloud if the NHL would have changed the icing rule had he not made it through the surgery. He said that he would like to see the NHL change the rule before anybody else has to go through what he went through, or worse, such as a spinal injury. Don Cherry of Hockey Night in Canada had also been lobbying for many years for a rule change and had been critical of the NHL for not transitioning to no-touch icing.

On February 12, 2011, Foster recorded his 100th career assist, a secondary assist on a goal by Andrew Cogliano in a 5–3 Oilers loss to the Ottawa Senators. Foster finished the 2010–11 season with 8 goals and 14 assists for 22 points in 74 games played as Edmonton failed to make the 2011 playoffs.

On July 1, 2011, Foster was traded to the Anaheim Ducks in exchange for defenceman Andy Sutton.

==== Anaheim Ducks (2011–2012) ====
Returning to the Ducks organization, Foster appeared in two games with the club's new AHL affiliate, the Syracuse Crunch, where he earned an assist. He made his debut with Anaheim on October 23, 2011, against the Phoenix Coyotes, in which he scored a goal against Mike Smith in a 5–4 loss. Foster played in nine games with Anaheim, scoring one goal and two points.

On December 12, 2011, Foster (along with Timo Pielmeier) was traded to the New Jersey Devils in exchange for Rod Pelley, Mark Fraser and the Devils' seventh-round draft pick in 2012.

==== New Jersey Devils (2011-2012) ====
Foster made his debut with the New Jersey Devils on December 13, 2011, in a 3–2 win over the Florida Panthers. Foster earned his first points, two assists, with New Jersey on December 17 in a 5–3 win over the Montreal Canadiens. On January 14, he scored his first goal for the Devils, against Ondřej Pavelec of the Winnipeg Jets in a 2–1 win. In 28 games with the Devils in 2011–12, Foster scored 3 goals and 9 assists for 12 points.

On February 24, 2012, Foster (along with Nick Palmieri, Stéphane Veilleux, the Washington Capitals' second-round draft pick in 2012 and the Devils' third-round draft pick in 2013) was traded to the Minnesota Wild in exchange for Marek Židlický.

==== Minnesota Wild (2011–2012) ====
Foster finished the 2011–12 season with the Wild. He played his first game with the club following the trade on February 26 in a 4–3 win over the San Jose Sharks. He would appear in 14 games with the Wild in his second stint with the club, earning no points. Following the season, Foster became a free agent.

==== Tappara (2012–2013) ====
With the prospect of the 2012–13 NHL lockout affecting his free agent contract status, on October 23, 2012, Foster signed a contract abroad with Tappara of the Finnish SM-liiga. He appeared in 13 games with Tappara over the course of the lockout, scoring six points. On January 8, 2013, with the signing of a new collective agreement between the NHL and NHL Players' Association (NHLPA), Foster left Tappara to return to North America with the intent of signing in the NHL.

==== Philadelphia Flyers (2012-2013) ====
On January 13, Foster signed a contract with the Philadelphia Flyers. He made his Flyers debut on January 19 in a 3–1 loss to the Pittsburgh Penguins. He earned his first point with the Flyers when he assisted on a goal by Sean Couturier in a 5–2 loss to the Buffalo Sabres on January 20. On February 2, he scored his first goal with Philadelphia, against Dan Ellis of the Carolina Hurricanes in a 5–3 victory. In 23 games with the Flyers during the shortened 2012–13 season, Foster had one goal and four assists for five points. At the end of the season, Foster became a free agent.

==== Late career ====
Released from the Flyers as a free agent at season's end, Foster returned to Europe to sign a one-year contract on July 30, 2013, with Croatian club KHL Medveščak Zagreb, the newest member of the Kontinental Hockey League (KHL).

After a brief spell in the KHL with Slovan Bratislava, Foster moved to the Deutsche Eishockey Liga (DEL) to join Adler Mannheim for the remainder of the DEL season. In his short tenure with the Eagles, Foster recorded 8 points in 15 playoff games to help claim the championship. On April 24, 2015, Foster opted to continue in Germany after signing a two-year contract with the Nürnberg Ice Tigers. In June 2016, the Ice Tigers announced that Foster's contract had been terminated prematurely by mutual consent. Foster retired from professional hockey the following month to pursue a career in coaching.

== Coaching career ==
=== Peterborough Petes (2016–2017) ===
Foster started his career behind the bench in July 2016 as an assistant coach of the OHL's Peterborough Petes, working with head coach Jody Hull. In the 2016–17 season, the Petes finished the season with a 42–21–2–3 record, finishing in first place in the Eastern Conference. In the playoffs, the Petes lost to the Mississauga Steelheads in the Eastern Conference Finals.

=== Kingston Frontenacs (2017–2020) ===
After one season with the Petes, Foster accepted an assistant coaching position with the OHL's Kingston Frontenacs, working under head coach Jay Varady. The Frontenacs finished the 2017–18 season with a 36–23–6–3 record, good for third place in the Eastern Conference. In the playoffs, the Frontenacs lost to the Hamilton Bulldogs in the Eastern Conference Finals.

In 2018, Foster was promoted to head coach of the Frontenacs after Varady took the head coaching position with the AHL's Tucson Roadrunners.

Foster made his head coaching debut on September 20, 2018, as the Frontenacs lost to the Peterborough Petes by a score of 4–0. The next night, on September 21, Foster earned his first career OHL victory as Kingston defeated the Oshawa Generals 5–2. As the Frontenacs were a rebuilding team in the 2018-19, the team struggled to a league worst record of 14-52-1-1, earning 30 points.

The Frontenacs saw some improvement during the 2019-20, as the club added underage forward Shane Wright to the team as he was granted exceptional status by the CHL. The Frontenacs finished the season with a 19-39-2-2 record in a shortened regular season, earning 42 points, which was a 12-point improvement from the previous season. Kingston finished in eighth place in the Eastern Conference, earning a playoff berth, however, the post-season was cancelled due to the 2020 coronavirus pandemic in North America.

On April 29, 2020, the Frontenacs announced changes to their coaching staff with the dismissal of Foster.

=== Oshawa Generals (2021–2022) ===
On July 6, 2021, the OHL's Oshawa Generals announced Foster had been added as an associate coach for the 2021–22 season. The Generals finished the season with a 30-31-2-5 record, earning 67 points and a playoff berth, as the club finished in sixth place in the Eastern Conference. Oshawa lost to the Kingston Frontenacs in six games in the conference quarter-finals.

=== Arizona Coyotes/Utah Mammoth (2022-pres) ===
On October 6, 2022, the Arizona Coyotes of the National Hockey League announced that Foster had joined the club as a development coach. Foster remained in the role following the Coyotes franchise relocation to Salt Lake City, Utah in 2024, where the club now operates as the Utah Mammoth.

== Personal ==
Foster has a brother, Craig, who was drafted fifth overall in the 2000 OHL Draft. Craig Foster spent five years playing in the OHL before playing four more in the Canadian Interuniversity Sport (CIS) with the UPEI Panthers. Craig resides in Sherwood, Prince Edward Island, and coaches a Midget AAA girls hockey team.

Foster and his wife, Stephanie, have three children.

== Career statistics ==
=== Regular season and playoffs ===
			Regular season					Playoffs
Season	Team	League	GP	G	A	Pts	PIM	GP	G	A	Pts	PIM
1997–98	Peterborough Petes	OHL	39	1	1	2	45	4	0	0	0	2
1998–99	Peterborough Petes	OHL	54	2	13	15	59	5	0	0	0	6
1999–2000	Peterborough Petes	OHL	68	6	18	24	116	5	1	2	3	4
2000–01	Peterborough Petes	OHL	62	17	24	41	78	7	1	1	2	10
2001–02	Chicago Wolves	AHL	39	6	9	15	59	14	1	1	2	21
2001–02	Peterborough Petes	OHL	33	10	4	14	58	—	—	—	—	—
2002–03	Chicago Wolves	AHL	75	15	27	42	159	9	1	3	4	14
2002–03	Atlanta Thrashers	NHL	2	0	0	0	0	—	—	—	—	—
2003–04	Chicago Wolves	AHL	67	11	19	30	95	10	0	3	3	12
2003–04	Atlanta Thrashers	NHL	3	0	1	1	0	—	—	—	—	—
2004–05	Cincinnati Mighty Ducks	AHL	78	17	25	42	71	9	2	3	5	28
2005–06	Houston Aeros	AHL	19	4	11	15	32	—	—	—	—	—
2005–06	Minnesota Wild	NHL	58	10	18	28	60	—	—	—	—	—
2006–07	Minnesota Wild	NHL	57	3	20	23	52	3	0	2	2	0
2007–08	Minnesota Wild	NHL	56	7	12	19	37	—	—	—	—	—
2008–09	Houston Aeros	AHL	6	1	5	6	6	3	0	2	2	0
2008–09	Minnesota Wild	NHL	10	1	5	6	6	—	—	—	—	—
2009–10	Tampa Bay Lightning	NHL	71	8	34	42	48	—	—	—	—	—
2010–11	Edmonton Oilers	NHL	74	8	14	22	45	—	—	—	—	—
2011–12	Anaheim Ducks	NHL	9	1	1	2	8	—	—	—	—	—
2011–12	Syracuse Crunch	AHL	2	0	1	1	4	—	—	—	—	—
2011–12	New Jersey Devils	NHL	28	3	9	12	23	—	—	—	—	—
2011–12	Minnesota Wild	NHL	14	0	0	0	4	—	—	—	—	—
2012–13	Tappara	SM-l	13	3	3	6	78	—	—	—	—	—
2012–13	Philadelphia Flyers	NHL	23	1	4	5	25	—	—	—	—	—
2013–14	KHL Medveščak Zagreb	KHL	53	6	16	22	64	4	1	0	1	4
2014–15	Slovan Bratislava	KHL	18	0	1	1	18	—	—	—	—	—
2014–15	Adler Mannheim	DEL	16	3	3	6	26	15	3	5	8	20
2015–16	Thomas Sabo Ice Tigers	DEL	38	4	13	17	76	6	2	2	4	4
AHL totals			286	54	97	151	426	42	4	10	14	75
NHL totals			405	42	118	160	308	3	0	2	2	0

=== International ===
Year	Team	Event	GP	G	A	Pts	PIM
1998	Canada	U18	3	0	0	0	0

== Awards and honors ==
Awards	Year
OHL
CHL Top Prospects Game	2000
AHL
Calder Cup (Chicago Wolves)	2002
Yanick Dupre Memorial Award	2004
KHL
All-Star Game	2014
DEL
Champion (Adler Mannheim)	2015

== Head coaching record ==
=== Ontario Hockey League ===
Team	Year	Regular Season							Post Season
Team	Year	G	W	L	OTL	SO	Pts	Finish	Result
Kingston Frontenacs	2018–19	68	14	52	1	1	30	5th in East	Missed playoffs
Kingston Frontenacs	2019–20	62	19	39	2	2	42	5th in East	Playoffs cancelled
OHL Total		130	33	91	3	3	72		0-0 (0.000)
