= List of Chicago Wolves seasons =

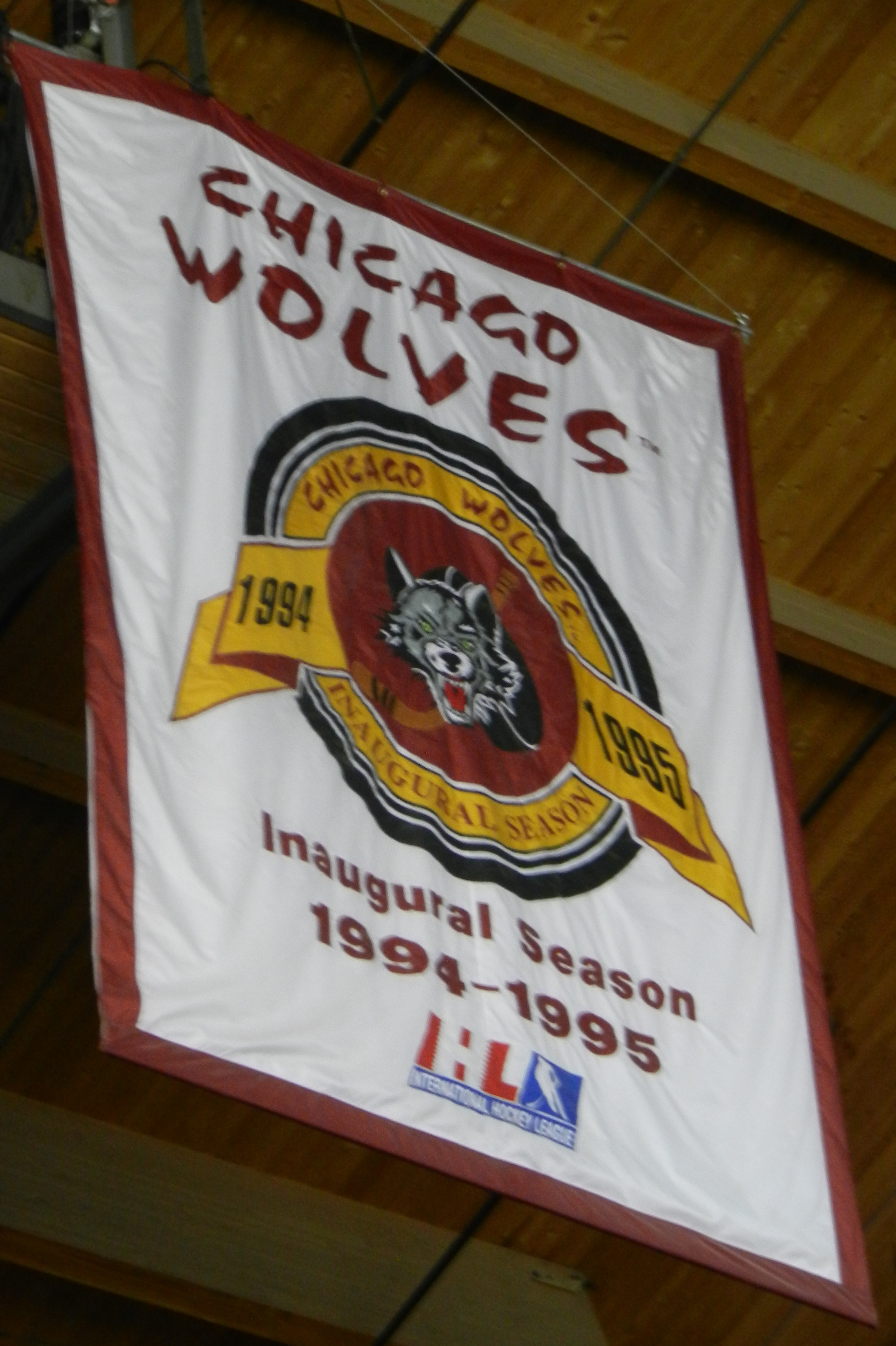
A banner commemorating the Wolves' inaugural season in the Allstate Arena

The Chicago Wolves are a professional ice hockey team playing in the American Hockey League (AHL). They are members of the Midwest division in the Western Conference. The Wolves were founded in 1994, as an expansion team in the International Hockey League (IHL). They joined the AHL in 2001, following the league's absorption of the IHL. In twenty professional seasons Chicago has won four league championships, six conference titles, and seven division championships, while failing to qualify for the playoffs five times.

The Wolves' first title came in the 1997–98 season when they won the Turner Cup as IHL champions. Two seasons later Chicago set a franchise record for points with 114, which helped them win the Fred A. Huber Trophy as the team with the league's best record. The Wolves continued their success in the playoffs losing four total games in three series en route to their second Turner Cup. In the IHL's final season the Wolves again won the Western Conference, but lost in the finals to the Orlando Solar Bears in five games. Joining the AHL for the 2001–02 season, they became the sixth team in league history to win the Calder Cup in their first year. Chicago's second season witnessed them play 23 overtime games, with the Wolves winning an AHL single season record 11 of the contests. Additionally, 7 of the wins came on home ice, which is also a league record. They captured their second Calder Cup in 2008, after defeating the Wilkes-Barre/Scranton Penguins in the finals.

== Table key ==
Finish	Final position in division or conference standings
GA	Goals against (goals scored by the Wolves' opponents)
GF	Goals for (goals scored by the Wolves)
GP	Number of games played
L	Number of losses
OT	Number of losses in overtime
SOL	Number of losses in the shootout
PIM	Penalties in minutes
Pts	Number of points
T	Number of ties
W	Number of wins

== Season-by-season records ==
League champions †	Conference champions *	Division champions ^	Regular season league leader ¤

League season	Conference	Division	Regular-season											Postseason					
League season	Conference	Division	Finish	GP	W	L	T	OT	SOL	Pts	GF	GA	PIM	GP	W	L	GF	GA	Result
International Hockey League
1994–95	—	Northern	3rd	81	34	33	—	14	0	82	261	306	2,223	3	0	3	9	16	Lost in first round 0–3 (Kalamazoo Wings)
1995–96	—	Midwest	2nd	82	40	34	—	—	8	88	288	310	2,423	9	4	5	29	32	Won in first round 3–1 (San Francisco Spiders); Lost in Quarterfinals 1–4 (Las Vegas Thunder)
1996–97	—	Midwest	3rd	82	40	36	—	—	6	86	276	290	1,508	4	1	3	11	14	Lost in first round 1–3 (San Antonio Dragons)
1997–98	Western*	Midwest^	1st	82	55¤	24	—	—	3	113	301¤	258	1,751	22	15	7	77	63	Won in first round 3–0 (Manitoba Moose); Won in Quarterfinals 4–2 (Milwaukee Admirals); Won in Semifinals 4–2 (Long Beach Ice Dogs); Won in Turner Cup Finals 4–3 (Detroit Vipers)†
1998–99	Western	Midwest^	1st	82	49	21	—	—	12	110	285	246	2,044	10	6	4	27	32	Won quarterfinals 3–0 (Manitoba Moose); Lost in Semifinals 3–4 (Houston Aeros)
1999–00	Western*	—	1st	82	53¤	21	—	—	8	114¤	270¤	228	1,695	16	12	4	55	39	Won quarterfinals 4–0 (Long Beach Ice Dogs); Won in Semifinals 4–2 (Houston Aeros); Won in Turner Cup Finals 4–2 (Grand Rapids Griffins)†
2000–01	Western*	—	1st	82	43	32	—	—	7	93	267	249	1,563	16	9	7	47	43	Won quarterfinals 4–1 (Milwaukee Admirals); Won in Semifinals 4–2 (Manitoba Moose); Lost in Turner Cup Finals 1–4 (Orlando Solar Bears)
American Hockey League
2001–02	Western*	West	4th	80	37	31	7	5	—	86	250	236	1,695	25	17	8	74	58	Won in Conference Qualifier 2–1 (Cincinnati Mighty Ducks); Won in Conference Quarterfinals 3–2 (Grand Rapids Griffins); Won in Conference Semifinals 4–3 (Syracuse Crunch); Won in Conference Finals 4–1 (Houston Aeros); Won in Calder Cup Finals 4–1 (Bridgeport Sound Tigers)†
2002–03	Western	West	2nd	80	43	25	8	4	—	98	276	237	1,905	8	3	5	21	21	Won in Conference Quarterfinals 3–2 (Hershey Bears); Lost in Conference Semifinals 4–0 (Grand Rapids Griffins)
2003–04	Western	West	2nd	80	42	26	9	3	—	96	246	208	1,658	10	6	4	31	24	Won in Division Semifinals 4–0 (Grand Rapids Griffins); Lost in Division Finals 2–4 (Milwaukee Admirals)
2004–05	Western*	West^	1st	80	49	24	—	5	2	105	245	211	1,954	18	12	6	50	32	Won in Division Semifinals 4–1 (Houston Aeros); Won in Division Finals 4–1 (Cincinnati Mighty Ducks); Won in Conference Finals 4–0 (Manitoba Moose); Lost in Calder Cup Finals 0–4 (Philadelphia Phantoms)
2005–06	Western	West	5th	80	36	32	—	4	8	84	278	275	2,028	—	—	—	—	—	Did not qualify
2006–07	Western	West	2nd	80	46	25	—	3	6	101	331¤	252	1,704	15	9	6	51	36	Won in Division Semifinals 4–0 (Milwaukee Admirals); Won in Division Finals 4–2 (Iowa Stars); Lost in Conference Finals 1–4 (Hamilton Bulldogs)
2007–08	Western*	West^	1st	80	53	22	—	2	3	111	300¤	226	1,869	24	16	8	76	52	Won in Division Semifinals 4–2 (Milwaukee Admirals); Won in Division Finals 4–3 (Rockford IceHogs); Won in Conference Finals 4–1 (Toronto Marlies); Won in Calder Cup Finals 4–2 (Wilkes-Barre/Scranton Penguins)†
2008–09	Western	West	6th	80	38	37	—	3	2	81	226	222	1,288	—	—	—	—	—	Did not qualify
2009–10	Western	West^	1st	80	49	24	—	1	6	105	264	214	1,112	14	7	7	44	46	Won in Division Semifinals 4–3 (Milwaukee Admirals); Lost in Division Finals 3–4 (Texas Stars)
2010–11	Western	West	6th	80	39	30	—	5	6	89	260	262	1402	—	—	—	—	—	Did not qualify
2011–12	Western	Midwest^	1st	76	42	27	—	4	3	91	213	193	1,065	5	2	3	15	15	Lost in Conference Quarterfinals 2–3 (San Antonio Rampage)
2012–13	Western	Midwest	4th	76	37	30	—	5	4	83	204	207	1,090	—	—	—	—	—	Did not qualify
2013–14	Western	Midwest^	1st	76	45	21	—	5	5	100	239	191	1,026	9	3	6	23	32	Won in Conference Quarterfinals 3–2 (Rochester Americans); Lost in Conference Semifinals 0–4 (Toronto Marlies)
2014–15	Western	Midwest	3rd	76	40	29	—	6	1	87	210	198	1,076	5	2	3	11	13	Lost in Conference Quarterfinals 2–3 (Utica Comets)
2015–16	Western	Central	6th	76	33	35	—	5	3	74	194	228	1,230	—	—	—	—	—	Did not qualify
2016–17	Western	Central^	1st	76	44	19	—	8	5	101	251	200	947	10	4	6	29	35	Won Division Semifinals 3–2 (Charlotte Checkers); Lost division finals 1–4 (Grand Rapids Griffins)
2017–18	Western	Central^	1st	76	42	23	—	7	4	95	244	208	848	3	0	3	6	11	Lost Division Semifinals 0–3 (Rockford IceHogs)
2018–19	Western*	Central^	1st	76	44	22	—	6	4	98	250	199	886	22	12	10	64	67	Won Division Semifinals 3–2 (Grand Rapids Griffins); Won Division Finals 4–2 (Iowa Wild); Won Conference Finals 4–2 (San Diego Gulls); Lost Calder Cup Finals 1–4 (Charlotte Checkers)
2019–20	Western	Central	4th	61	27	26	—	5	3	62	155	175	704	—	—	—	—	—	Season cancelled due to the COVID-19 pandemic
2020–21	Western	Central^	1st	33	21	9	—	1	2	45	132	94	529	—	—	—	—	—	No playoffs were held due to the COVID-19 pandemic
IHL totals				573	314	201	—	14	44	686	1,948	1,887	13,207	80	47	33	255	239	7 playoff appearances
AHL totals				1,502	807	517	24	87	67	1,791	4,468	4,236	26,016	168	93	76	495	442	13 playoff appearances
Franchise totals				2,075	1,121	718	24	101	111	2,477	6,416	6,123	38,723	248	140	109	750	681	20 playoff appearances
