= Viljami =

Viljami is a given name. Notable people with the name include:

- Viljami Jokiranta, Finnish footballer
- Viljami Kalliokoski, Finnish farmer and politician
- Viljami Marjala, Finnish ice hockey player
- Viljami Sinisalo, Finnish footballer
