= 2024–25 Rochester Americans season =

American Hockey League season

2024–25 Rochester Americans
- Division: 2nd North
- Conference: 4th Eastern
- 2024–25 record: 42–22–5–3
- Home record: 19–13–3–1
- Road record: 23–9–2–2
- Goals for: 238
- Goals against: 191

Team information
- General manager: Jason Karmanos
- Coach: Michael Leone
- Captain: Mason Jobst
- Alternate captains: Brett Murray; Josh Dunne; Ethan Prow; Zach Metsa
- Minor league affiliate: Jacksonville Icemen (ECHL)

Team leaders
- Goals: Isak Rosen (29)
- Assists: Zach Metsa (40)
- Points: Isak Rosen (58)
- Penalty minutes: Vsevolod Komarov (83)
- Plus/minus: Nikita Novikov (+30)
- Wins: Devon Levi (24)
- Goals against average: Devon Levi (2.17)

The 2024–25 Rochester Americans season is the 69th season of play for the Amerks in the American Hockey League (AHL), the 43rd as the primary affiliate of the Buffalo Sabres, and the first with new head coach, Michael Leone.

The Amerks clinched a playoff spot in the Calder Cup Playoffs after a 4–2 win over the Springfield Thunderbirds on April 2, 2025, making this their 50th postseason appearance in franchise history.

In the North Division semifinals round of the playoffs, the Amerks would sweep the Syracuse Crunch, with two straight shutouts to close the series, marking their best postseason performance since the 2022-23 AHL season, however they lost Game 5 to the Laval Rocket in the North Division finals to end their season.

== Background ==
On May 13, 2024, the Amerks former head coach, Seth Appert, was promoted to assistant head coach of the Buffalo Sabres, alongside Amir Gulati, the former video coordinator.

Michael Leone, the former Green Bay Gamblers head coach, was officially hired as the new head coach of the Rochester Amerks on June 6, 2024, making him the 34th head coach in Amerks history.

Kent Weisbeck, the former athletic trainer for the Rochester Americans, officially retired on September 10, 2024 after four decades of work for the Amerks.

Due to the list of changes above, several people were officially promoted and hired to the Hockey Operations Department for the Rochester Americans on September 23, 2024.

== Schedule and results ==
The AHL season schedule was revealed on July 11, 2024, with the Amerks season beginning on October 11, 2024, and ending on April 19, 2025.

=== Preseason ===
2024 preseason game log: 1–0–0–0 (Road: 1–0–0–0)
#	Date	Visitor	Score	Home	OT	Decision	Location	Attendance	Record	Recap
1	October 6	Rochester	7–1	Syracuse		Sandstrom (1–0–0)	Upstate Medical University Arena		1–0–0–0

=== Regular season ===
2024–25 game log

October: 3–3–0–0 (Home: 1–2–0–0; Road: 2–1–0–0)
#	Date	Visitor	Score	Home	OT	Decision	Attendance	Record	Pts	Recap
1	October 11	Belleville	3–2	Rochester		Sandstrom (0–1–0–0)		0–1–0–0	0
2	October 12	Rochester	4–1	Utica		Houser (1–0–0–0)		1–1–0–0	2
3	October 18	Toronto	4–2	Rochester		Sandstrom (0–2–0–0)		1–2–0–0	2
4	October 19	Rochester	2–3	Toronto		Houser (1–1–0–0)		1–3–0–0	2
5	October 23	Cleveland	1–6	Rochester		Houser (2–1–0–0)		2–3–0–0	4
6	October 26	Rochester	5–4	Cleveland	SO	Houser (3–1–0–0)		3–3–0–0	6

November: 7–4–3–0 (Home: 2–3–2–0; Road: 5–1–1–0)
#	Date	Visitor	Score	Home	OT	Decision	Attendance	Record	Pts	Recap
7	November 1	Rochester	8–1	Utica		Sandstrom (1–2–0–0)		4–3–0–0	8
8	November 2	Rochester	3–2	Utica	SO	Houser (4–1–0–0)		5–3–0–0	10
9	November 6	Rochester	4–2	Cleveland		Sandstrom (2–2–0–0)		6–3–0–0	12
10	November 8	Hartford	3–6	Rochester		Sandstrom (3–2–0–0) & Michael Houser		7–3–0–0	14
11	November 9	Rochester	0–5	Wilkes-Barre/Scranton		Houser (4–2–0–0)		7–4–0–0	14
12	November 13	Laval	3–2	Rochester	OT	Houser (4–2–1–0)		7–4–1–0	15
13	November 16	Laval	4–1	Rochester		Houser (4–3–1–0)		7–5–1–0	15
14	November 17	Rochester	1–2	Toronto	OT	Sandstrom (3–2–1–0)		7–5–2–0	16
15	November 20	Rochester	2–1	Laval	OT	Levi (1–0–0–0) & Michael Houser		8–5–2–0	18
16	November 22	Hershey	4–3	Rochester	OT	Levi (1–0–1–0)		8–5–3–0	19
17	November 23	Utica	5–1	Rochester		Sandstrom (3–3–1–0)		8–6–3–0	19
18	November 27	Cleveland	5–4	Rochester		Levi (1–1–1–0)		8–7–3–0	19
19	November 29	Syracuse	0–3	Rochester		Levi (2–1–1–0)		9–7–3–0	21
20	November 30	Rochester	3–2	Syracuse	SO	Levi (3–1–1–0)		10–7–3–0	23

December: 9–2–0–0 (Home: 3–1–0–0; Road: 6–1–0–0)
#	Date	Visitor	Score	Home	OT	Decision	Attendance	Record	Pts	Recap
21	December 4	Utica	2–3	Rochester		Levi (4–1–1–0)		11–7–3–0	25
22	December 6	Rochester	0–6	Charlotte		Sandstrom (3–4–1–0)		11–8–3–0	25
23	December 7	Rochester	3–0	Charlotte		Levi (5–1–1–0)		12–8–3–0	27
24	December 11	Rochester	3–1	Laval		Levi (6–1–1–0)		13–8–3–0	29
25	December 13	Rochester	7–4	Belleville		Levi (7–1–1–0)		14–8–3–0	31
26	December 14	Rochester	8–2	Belleville		Sandstrom (4–4–1–0)		15–8–3–0	33
27	December 18	Syracuse	5–2	Rochester		Levi (7–2–1–0)		15–9–3–0	33
28	December 20	Syracuse	1–3	Rochester		Levi (8–2–1–0)		16–9–3–0	35
29	December 22	Rochester	3–2	Cleveland		Levi (9–2–1–0)		17–9–3–0	37
30	December 27	Utica	3–6	Rochester		Levi (10–2–1–0)		18–9–3–0	39
31	December 28	Rochester	3–2	Utica	OT	Sandstrom (5–4–1–0)		19–9–3–0	41

January: 7–3–0–1 (Home: 3–0–0–1; Road: 4–3–0–0)
#	Date	Visitor	Score	Home	OT	Decision	Attendance	Record	Pts	Recap
32	January 3	Rochester	5–2	Springfield		Levi (11–2–1–0)		20–9–3–0	43
33	January 4	Rochester	6–3	Bridgeport		Sandstrom (6–4–1–0)		21–9–3–0	45
34	January 10	Utica	1–5	Rochester		Levi (12–2–1–0)		22–9–3–0	47
35	January 11	Rochester	2–6	Syracuse		Levi (12–3–1–0)		22–10–3–0	47
36	January 17	Lehigh Valley	3–2	Rochester	SO	Levi (12–3–1–1)		22–10–3–1	48
37	January 18	Rochester	3–2	Lehigh Valley		Sandstrom (7–4–1–0)		23–10–3–1	50
38	January 19	Rochester	4–5	Hershey		Houser (4–3–1–0)		23–11–3–1	50
39	January 24	Rochester	0–3	Providence		Levi (12–4–2–1)		23–12–3–1	50
40	January 25	Rochester	6–3	Hartford		Sandstrom (8–4–1–0)		24–12–3–1	52
41	January 29	Utica	4–7	Rochester		Levi (13–4–2–1)		25–12–3–1	54
42	January 31	Syracuse	1–4	Rochester		Levi (14–4–2–1)		26–12–3–1	56

February: 8–2–0–1 (Home: 5–2–0–0; Road: 3–0–0–1)
#	Date	Visitor	Score	Home	OT	Decision	Attendance	Record	Pts	Recap
43	February 1	Rochester	4–3	Syracuse	OT	Sandstrom (9–4–1–0)		27–12–3–1	58
43	February 7	Belleville	0–4	Rochester		Levi (15–4–2–1)		28–12–3–1	60
44	February 11	Rochester	5–1	Cleveland		Levi (16–4–2–1)		29–12–3–1	62
45	February 14	Rochester	1–5	Syracuse		Levi (16–5–2)		29–13–3–1	62
46	February 15	Rochester	4–3	Utica	OT	Sandstrom (10–4–1–0)		30–13–3–1	64
47	February 16	Laval	5–2	Rochester		Houser (4–4–1–0)		30–14–3–1	64
48	February 19	Cleveland	0–4	Rochester		Levi (17–5–1–1)		31–14–3–1	66
49	February 21	Belleville	3–6	Rochester		Houser (5–4–1–0)		32–14–3–1	68
50	February 23	Toronto	0–1	Rochester	SO	Levi (18–5–1–1)		33–14–3–1	70
51	February 26	Wilkes-Barre/Scranton	2–5	Rochester		Levi (19–5–1–1)		34–14–3–1	72
52	February 28	Rochester	2–3	Utica	SO	Houser (5–4–2–1)		34–14–3–2	73

March: 5–4–1–1 (Home: 3–2–0–1; Road: 2–2–1–0)
#	Date	Visitor	Score	Home	OT	Decision	Attendance	Record	Pts	Recap
53	March 1	Rochester	3–4	Utica	SO	Levi (19–5–1–2)		34–14–3–3	74
54	March 7	Rochester	3–4	Laval		Levi (19–6–1–2)		34–15–3–3	74
55	March 8	Rochester	1–2	Laval		Levi (19–7–1–2)		34–16–3–3	74
56	March 12	Charlotte	4–3	Rochester		Levi (19–8–1–2)		34–17–3–3	74
57	March 14	Providence	4–3	Rochester	SO	Levi (20–8–1–2)		35–17–3–3	76
58	March 21	Charlotte	1–2	Rochester		Levi (20–9–1–2)		35–18–3–3	76
59	March 22	Rochester	4–1	Syracuse		Sandstrom (11–4–1–0)		36–18–3–3	78
60	March 23	Utica	3–4	Rochester		Levi (21–9–1–2)		37–18–3–3	80
61	March 28	Bridgeport	6–0	Rochester		Levi (22–9–1–2)		38–18–3–3	82
62	March 29	Rochester	4–2	Syracuse		Sandstrom (12–4–1–0)		39–18–3–3	84
63	March 30	Syracuse	3–2	Rochester	OT	Levi (22–9–2–2)		39–18–4–3	85

April: 3–4–1–0 (Home: 2–3–0–0; Road: 1–1–1–0)
#	Date	Visitor	Score	Home	OT	Decision	Attendance	Record	Pts	Recap
64	April 2	Springfield	2–4	Rochester		Levi (23–9–2–2)		40–18–4–3	87
65	April 4	Rochester	0–5	Belleville		Sandstrom (12–5–1–0)		40–19–4–3	87
66	April 5	Rochester	4–0	Belleville		Levi (24–9–2–2)		41–19–4–3	89
67	April 9	Belleville	4–2	Rochester		Levi (24–10–2–2)		41–20–4–3	89
68	April 11	Laval	4–2	Rochester		Levi (24–11–2–2)		41–21–4–3	89
69	April 16	Cleveland	1–4	Rochester		Levi (25–11–2–2)		42–21–4–3	91
70	April 18	Toronto	3–0	Rochester		Levi (25–12–2–2)		42–22–4–3	91
71	April 19	Rochester	2–3	Toronto	OT	Sandstrom (12–5–2–0)		42–22–5–3	92

Legend: Win (2 points) Loss (0 points) Overtime/shootout loss (1 point)

=== Playoffs ===
2025 Calder Cup playoffs

North Division Semifinals round vs. (N3) Syracuse Crunch: Rochester won 3–0
#	Date	Visitor	Score	Home	OT	Decision	Location	Attendance	Series	Recap
1	April 25	Syracuse	2–3	Rochester		Sandstrom (1–0–0)	Blue Cross Arena		1–0
2	April 27	Syracuse	0–4	Rochester		Levi (1–0–0)	Blue Cross Arena		2–0
3	May 1	Rochester	4–0	Syracuse		Levi (2–0–0)	Upstate Medical University Arena		3–0

North Division Finals round vs. (N1) Laval Rocket: Laval won 3–2
#	Date	Visitor	Score	Home	OT	Decision	Location	Attendance	Series	Recap
1	May 14	Laval	5–4	Rochester		Levi (0–1–0)	Blue Cross Arena		0–1
2	May 16	Laval	3–5	Rochester		Levi (1–1–0)	Blue Cross Arena		1–1
3	May 21	Rochester	1–4	Laval		Levi (1–2–0)	Place Bell		1–2
4	May 23	Rochester	5–1	Laval		Levi (2–2–0)	Place Bell		2–2
5	May 25	Rochester	0–5	Laval		Levi (2–3–0)	Place Bell		2–3

== Player statistics ==
=== Skaters ===
Overall (Regular season + Playoffs)
Player	GP	G	A	Pts	+/−	PIM
Isak Rosen	63	29	27	56	+4	10
Brett Murray	68	27	22	49	+14	25
Zach Metsa	71	7	41	48	+17	16
Lukas Rousek	73	7	36	43	+4	44
Kale Clague	71	12	31	43	+3	32
Mason Jobst	72	20	18	38	−1	49
Konsta Helenius	67	15	23	38	+1	26
Noah Ostlund	47	19	17	36	+20	14
Anton Wahlberg	62	11	19	30	+5	26
Josh Dunne	70	10	20	30	+7	46
Riley Fiddler-Schultz	53	14	14	28	+1	10
Graham Slaggert	71	12	12	24	+17	48
Jack Rathbone	65	6	18	24	+9	49
Viktor Neuchev	39	7	15	22	−3	6
Nikita Novikov	70	6	15	21	+30	52
Brendan Warren	60	11	9	20	+12	17
Vsevolod Kamarov	70	2	17	18	+8	83
Tyson Kozak	33	8	8	16	+5	37
Ryan Johnson	68	2	11	13	+12	38
Nicolas Aube-Kubel	12	4	4	8	+3	6
Erik Brannstrom	13	5	2	7	+3	16
Ethan Prow	21	1	6	7	−7	8
Tyler Tullio	30	1	6	7	−1	30
Jagger Joshua	23	1	4	5	−2	46
Jiri Kulich	6	3	2	5	0	0
Alexsandr Kisakov	12	3	1	4	+2	8
Oliver Nadeau	4	0	2	2	0	4
Colton Poolman	5	0	1	1	−2	0
Tyler Kopff	5	0	1	1	0	0
Noah Laaouan	1	0	0	0	−1	0

=== Goaltenders ===
Overall (Regular season + Playoffs)
Player	GP	GS	TOI	W	L	OT	ST	GA	GAA	SA	SV%	SO	G	A	PIM
Devon Levi	44		2,273	25	10	2	2	82	2.17	941	.920	8	0	3	2
Felix Sandstrom	20		1,029	14	5	1	0	49	2.86	432	.898	0	0	1	0
Michael Houser	14		743	5	4	2	1	35	2.83	292	.893	0	0	0	0

^{†}Denotes player spent time with another team before joining the Sabres. Stats reflect time with the Sabres only.
^{‡}Denotes player was traded mid-season. Stats reflect time with the Sabres only.
Bold/italics denotes franchise record.
