= Josh Brown (ice hockey) =

Canadian ice hockey player (born 1994)

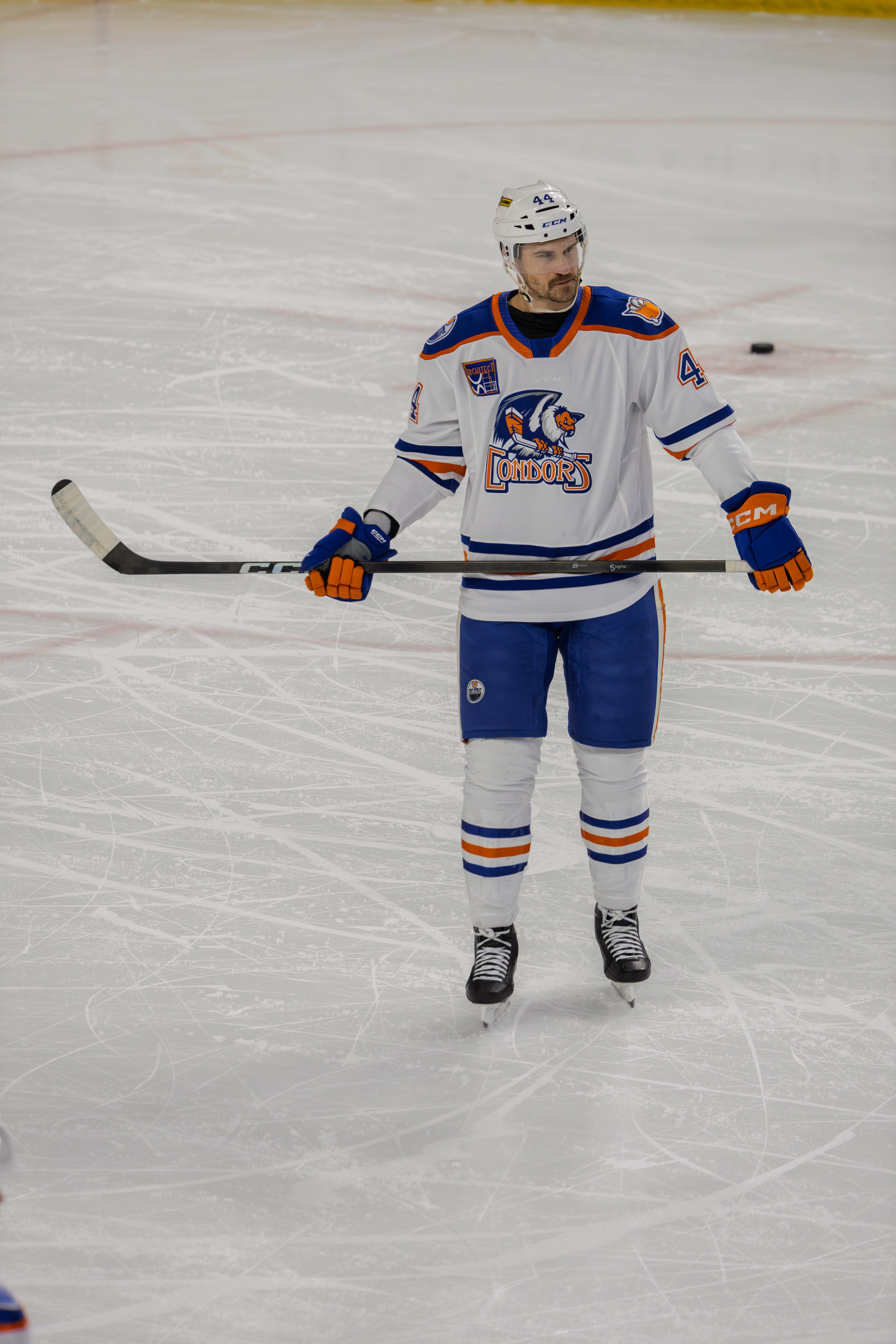
- Brown with the Bakersfield Condors in 2026
- Born: January 21, 1994 (age 32) London, Ontario, Canada
- Height: 6 ft 6 in (198 cm)
- Weight: 225 lb (102 kg; 16 st 1 lb)
- Position: Defence
- Shoots: Right
- NHL team (P) Cur. team Former teams: Edmonton Oilers; Bakersfield Condors (AHL); Florida Panthers; Ottawa Senators; Boston Bruins; Arizona Coyotes
- NHL draft: 152nd overall, 2013; Florida Panthers
- Playing career: 2015–present

Joshua Brown (born January 21, 1994) is a Canadian professional ice hockey defenceman for the Bakersfield Condors of the American Hockey League (AHL) while under contract to the Edmonton Oilers of the National Hockey League (NHL). Brown was selected in the sixth round, 152nd overall, by the Florida Panthers in the 2013 NHL entry draft. Before joining Edmonton, Brown played for the Panthers, Ottawa Senators, Boston Bruins, and Arizona Coyotes.

== Playing career ==
=== Junior ===
Brown played as a youth locally in his hometown of London, Ontario at the midget level with the London Jr. Knights before he was selected by the Oshawa Generals of the Ontario Hockey League (OHL) in the third round, 44th overall in the 2010 OHL Priority Selection.

As a 16 year old in 2010–11, he played in the Ontario Junior Hockey League with the Whitby Fury. He began his four-year major junior career with the Generals in the OHL in 2011–12. Using his large frame as a physical, defensive defenceman, Brown remained with the Generals throughout his junior career, captaining the club for two seasons and capturing the Memorial Cup in his final junior season in 2014–15.

=== Professional ===
Selected by the Florida Panthers of the National Hockey League (NHL) in the sixth round, 152nd overall, of the 2013 NHL entry draft, Brown later signed a three-year, entry-level contract with the team on April 10, 2015. In his first professional season, Brown split the 2015–16 season, between the Panthers' American Hockey League (AHL) affiliate, the Portland Pirates, and the Manchester Monarchs of the ECHL. He appeared in ten games with the Pirates, registering one assist and played in 54 games with the Monarchs, totaling 12 points, and appearing in their first-round playoff series.

In his first full campaign in the AHL, Brown spent the 2016–17 season with the Panthers' new affiliate, the Springfield Thunderbirds. In the Thunderbirds' inaugural season, he notched a career best three goals and 13 points from the blueline in 72 games. He followed that up the next season with one goal and ten points in 66 games with Springfield. As an impending restricted free agent, Brown agreed to a two-year, two-way contract extension to remain within the Panthers organization on May 31, 2018. In the 2018–19 season, Brown returned to the Thunderbirds for his third year with the club. After adding three goals in 19 games, Brown received his first call-up to the NHL by the Panthers on January 18, 2019. Recalled due to an injury to fellow defenceman, MacKenzie Weegar, and with the Panthers needing a physical presence, Brown made his NHL debut in a 3–1 victory over the Toronto Maple Leafs at BB&T Center in Sunrise, Florida, on January 19. He registered his first NHL goal and point in a 6–1 victory over the Detroit Red Wings on March 10. He finished the season having appeared in 37 games with the Panthers, registering the one goal and two points and 22 games with Springfield, scoring three goals.

In his first full season with the Panthers in 2019–20, Brown appeared in 56 games, posting three goals and eight points, before the NHL suspended the season due to the COVID-19 pandemic on March 12, 2020. He made his NHL playoff debut in the pandemic-delayed 2020 Stanley Cup playoffs in the Panthers series versus the New York Islanders. He was inserted into the lineup for Game 3 of the best-of-five series on August 5, which the Panthers won 3–2. He appeared in two games, going scoreless, as the Islanders eliminated the Panthers in the next game.

In need of a new contract Brown was traded in the following off-season by the Panthers to the Ottawa Senators in exchange for a 2020 fourth-round draft pick on October 2, 2020. As a restricted free agent, Brown signed a two-year, $2.4 million contract with the Senators on October 5. During the pandemic-delayed 2020–21 season, Brown made his Senators debut in the team's opening night 5–3 victory over the Toronto Maple Leafs on January 15, 2021. He notched his first point for the Senators assisting on Colin White's first period goal in a 4–2 loss to the Vancouver Canucks. He finished the season making 26 appearances for the Senators, registering just the one assist. In the 2021–22 season, he was placed in COVID-19 protocol on November 10, and returned to the lineup on November 20. On November 26, Brown suffered an upper-body injury that kept him out of the lineup until January 13, 2022. Brown played 46 games with Ottawa, recording six assists.

On March 21, 2022, Brown was traded by the Senators, along with a 2022 conditional seventh-round selection, to the Boston Bruins in exchange for forward Zachary Senyshyn and a 2022 fifth-round draft pick. He made his Bruins debut on March 31 in a 8–1 win over the New Jersey Devils. He finished the 2021–22 season with a combined six points in 52 games played with the Senators and Bruins.

On July 13, 2022, having left the Bruins as an unrestricted free agent, Brown was signed to a two-year, $2.55 million contract with the Arizona Coyotes. In his first season with the Coyotes, Brown was a mainstay on their blueline. In his second season with the Coyotes, Brown was in and out of the lineup, as the team's defensive depth improved. This pushed Brown down the depth chart into the seventh defenceman position and often led to him being scratched. He appeared in only 51 games with the Coyotes in the 2023–24 season, scoring three goals and ten points.

Brown became an unrestricted free agent again at the end of his Coyotes contract. On July 1, 2024, he signed a three-year, $3 million contract with the Edmonton Oilers. One of the final cuts at Oilers training camp, Brown was placed on waivers and after going unclaimed, was assigned to Edmonton's AHL affiliate, the Bakersfield Condors, for the 2024–25 season. He was recalled by Edmonton on November 17 after defenceman Darnell Nurse suffered an injury and made his Oilers debut on November 18 against the Montreal Canadiens. He played in two games before being returned to Bakersfield on November 20. He was recalled again on November 21 along with Drake Caggiula.

== Career statistics ==
			Regular season					Playoffs
Season	Team	League	GP	G	A	Pts	PIM	GP	G	A	Pts	PIM
2010–11	Whitby Fury	OJHL	35	6	4	10	59	—	—	—	—	—
2011–12	Oshawa Generals	OHL	46	0	4	4	49	2	0	0	0	0
2012–13	Oshawa Generals	OHL	68	0	16	16	79	9	1	4	5	11
2013–14	Oshawa Generals	OHL	56	2	10	12	83	9	0	0	0	18
2014–15	Oshawa Generals	OHL	60	4	17	21	92	21	2	2	4	30
2015–16	Manchester Monarchs	ECHL	54	1	11	12	80	5	0	0	0	4
2015–16	Portland Pirates	AHL	10	0	1	1	7	—	—	—	—	—
2016–17	Springfield Thunderbirds	AHL	72	3	10	13	96	—	—	—	—	—
2017–18	Springfield Thunderbirds	AHL	66	1	9	10	67	—	—	—	—	—
2018–19	Springfield Thunderbirds	AHL	22	3	0	3	34	—	—	—	—	—
2018–19	Florida Panthers	NHL	37	1	1	2	28	—	—	—	—	—
2019–20	Florida Panthers	NHL	56	3	5	8	39	2	0	0	0	0
2020–21	Ottawa Senators	NHL	26	0	1	1	30	—	—	—	—	—
2021–22	Ottawa Senators	NHL	46	0	6	6	32	—	—	—	—	—
2021–22	Boston Bruins	NHL	6	0	0	0	5	1	0	0	0	0
2022–23	Arizona Coyotes	NHL	68	4	3	7	87	—	—	—	—	—
2023–24	Arizona Coyotes	NHL	51	3	7	10	75	—	—	—	—	—
2024–25	Bakersfield Condors	AHL	39	0	4	4	77	—	—	—	—	—
2024–25	Edmonton Oilers	NHL	10	0	1	1	11	1	0	0	0	0
2025–26	Bakersfield Condors	AHL	57	2	11	13	78	3	0	2	2	6
NHL totals			300	11	24	35	307	4	0	0	0	0

== Awards and honours ==
Award	Year	Ref
CHL
Memorial Cup champion	2015	
