= 2024–25 AHL season =

- League: American Hockey League
- Sport: Ice hockey
- Duration: October 11, 2024 – April 20, 2025

Regular season
- Macgregor Kilpatrick Trophy: Laval Rocket
- Season MVP: Andrew Poturalski (San Jose Barracuda)
- Top scorer: Andrew Poturalski (San Jose Barracuda)

Playoffs
- Playoffs MVP: Arturs Silovs (Abbotsford)

Calder Cup
- Champions: Abbotsford Canucks
- Runners-up: Charlotte Checkers

AHL seasons
- 2023–24 2025–26

The 2024–25 AHL season was the 89th season of the American Hockey League. The regular season began on October 11, 2024, and ended on April 20, 2025. The 2025 Calder Cup playoffs followed the conclusion of the regular season, and ended on June 23, with the Abbotsford Canucks winning their first Calder Cup since 1991. With the deactivation of the Arizona Coyotes, the Tucson Roadrunners became the new AHL affiliate of the Utah Hockey Club, with all assets and contracts going to Utah.

== League changes ==
=== Team and NHL affiliation changes ===
AHL team	New affiliate	Previous affiliate
Chicago Wolves	Carolina Hurricanes	Independent
Tucson Roadrunners	Utah Hockey Club	Arizona Coyotes

=== Coaching changes ===
Off–season
Team	2023–24 coach	2024–25 coach	Notes
Abbotsford Canucks	Jeremy Colliton	Manny Malhotra	On May 24, 2024, Malhotra was named as head coach of Abbotsford, succeeding Colliton, who would later become an associate coach of the New Jersey Devils for the 2024–25 season.
Coachella Valley Firebirds	Dan Bylsma	Derek Laxdal	Following the 2023–24 season, Bylsma was promoted head coach of the Seattle Kraken, but remained as head coach of the Firebirds throughout the rest of their playoff run. Once the off-season started and Bylsma was officially promoted, Laxdal was named as head coach of the Firebirds.
Chicago Wolves	Bob Nardella	Cam Abbott	On June 13, 2023, with the Wolves operation without an NHL affiliate, they hired Nardella as head coach. With the Wolves once again becoming the affiliate of the Hurricanes, the Hurricanes opted to hire Abbott as head coach.
Hartford Wolf Pack	Kris Knoblauch; Steve Smith (interim)	Grant Potulny	After the Edmonton Oilers fired head coach Jay Woodcroft on November 12, 2023, Knoblauch was named as head coach of the Oilers. On the same day, the Wolf Pack named Smith as interim head coach. For the 2024–25 season, Potulny was named as head coach of the Wolf Pack.
Laval Rocket	Jean-Francois Houle	Pascal Vincent	On June 21, 2024, the Rocket and Houle mutually agreed to part ways for Houle to accept the head coaching position at Clarkson of the NCAA. Laval native and former Columbus Blue Jackets head coach Pascal Vincent was named as head coach of the Rocket on July 16.
Rochester Americans	Seth Appert	Michael Leone	Following the 2023–24 season, Appert was named to the coaching staff of Buffalo's Lindy Ruff. Leone was named as head coach of the Amerks' on June 6, 2024.
Springfield Thunderbirds	Drew Bannister; Daniel Tkaczuk (interim)	Steve Konowalchuk	After the St. Louis Blues fired head coach Craig Berube on December 12, 2023, Bannister was named as head coach of the Blues and Tkaczuk was elevated to interim head coach of the Thunderbirds. The interim tag had initially been removed from Tkaczuk for the 2024–25 season, but Konowalchuk was named as head coach of the Thunderbirds in May 2024.
Wilkes-Barre/Scranton Penguins	J.D. Forrest	Kirk MacDonald	Following the 2023–24 season, Forrest's contract was not renewed. MacDonald was named as head coach of Wilkes-Barre/Scranton on June 19, 2024.
In–season
Team	Outgoing coach	Incoming coach	Notes
Rockford IceHogs	Anders Sorensen	Mark Eaton (interim)	After the Chicago Blackhawks fired head coach Luke Richardson on December 5, 2024, Sorensen was named as head coach of the Blackhawks. On the same day, the IceHogs named Eaton as interim head coach.
Utica Comets	Kevin Dineen	Ryan Parent (interim)	After the Comets started winless in their first nine games to begin the season, Dineen was relieved of his duties on November 6, 2024. Parent was named as interim head coach on the same day.

== Standings ==
z– Macgregor Kilpatrick Trophy (regular season) champion
y– indicates team has clinched division and a playoff spot
x– indicates team has clinched a playoff spot
e– indicates team has been eliminated from playoff contention

Standings as of games through April 20, 2025

=== Eastern Conference ===
Atlantic Division	GP	W	L	OTL	SOL	Pts	Pts%	GF	GA
y–Hershey Bears (WSH)	72	44	20	7	1	96	.667	234	211
x–Charlotte Checkers (FLA)	72	44	22	3	3	94	.653	234	185
x–Providence Bruins (BOS)	72	41	23	5	3	90	.625	240	188
x–Wilkes-Barre/Scranton Penguins (PIT)	72	40	24	7	1	88	.611	244	215
x–Lehigh Valley Phantoms (PHI)	72	36	28	6	2	80	.556	215	221
x–Springfield Thunderbirds (STL)	72	34	32	2	4	74	.514	218	236
e–Hartford Wolf Pack (NYR)	72	30	33	7	2	69	.479	199	234
e–Bridgeport Islanders (NYI)	72	15	50	4	3	37	.257	181	294

North Division	GP	W	L	OTL	SOL	Pts	Pts%	GF	GA
z–Laval Rocket (MTL)	72	48	19	3	2	101	.701	229	178
x–Rochester Americans (BUF)	72	42	22	5	3	92	.639	238	191
x–Syracuse Crunch (TBL)	72	37	23	8	4	86	.597	206	178
x–Toronto Marlies (TOR)	72	37	23	4	8	86	.597	209	197
x–Cleveland Monsters (CBJ)	72	35	26	5	6	81	.563	206	225
e–Belleville Senators (OTT)	72	34	27	6	5	79	.549	206	223
e–Utica Comets (NJD)	72	31	33	6	2	70	.486	196	223

=== Western Conference ===
Central Division	GP	W	L	OTL	SOL	Pts	Pts%	GF	GA
y–Milwaukee Admirals (NSH)	72	40	21	5	6	91	.632	218	184
x–Texas Stars (DAL)	72	43	26	3	0	89	.618	240	210
x–Grand Rapids Griffins (DET)	72	37	29	4	2	80	.556	202	203
x–Chicago Wolves (CAR)	72	37	31	4	0	78	.542	205	223
x–Rockford IceHogs (CHI)	72	31	33	6	2	70	.486	206	220
e–Iowa Wild (MIN)	72	27	37	6	2	62	.431	201	251
e–Manitoba Moose (WPG)	72	25	41	3	3	56	.389	169	248

Pacific Division	GP	W	L	OTL	SOL	Pts	Pts%	GF	GA
y–Colorado Eagles (COL)	72	43	21	5	3	94	.653	250	185
x–Abbotsford Canucks (VAN)	72	44	24	2	2	92	.639	241	204
x–Ontario Reign (LAK)	72	43	25	3	1	90	.625	225	207
x–Coachella Valley Firebirds (SEA)	72	37	25	5	5	84	.583	225	205
x-Calgary Wranglers (CGY)	72	37	28	4	3	81	.563	230	239
x–San Jose Barracuda (SJS)	72	36	27	5	4	81	.563	244	231
x–Tucson Roadrunners (UTA)	72	34	32	4	2	74	.514	228	237
e–Bakersfield Condors (EDM)	72	32	30	7	3	74	.514	224	233
e–San Diego Gulls (ANA)	72	29	35	5	3	66	.458	216	251
e–Henderson Silver Knights (VGK)	72	29	38	3	2	63	.438	202	251

== Statistical leaders ==
=== Leading skaters ===
The following players are sorted by points, then goals. As of April 20, 2025.

GP = Games played; G = Goals; A = Assists; Pts = Points; +/– = P Plus–minus; PIM = Penalty minutes

Player	Team	GP	G	A	Pts	PIM
Andrew Poturalski	San Jose Barracuda	59	30	43	73	34
Matej Blumel	Texas Stars	67	39	33	72	26
Seth Griffith	Bakersfield Condors	65	21	51	72	46
Chris Terry	Bridgeport Islanders	68	19	47	66	57
Charles Hudon	Ontario Reign	67	20	44	64	57
Matthew Peca	Springfield Thunderbirds	68	31	32	63	16
Alex Barre-Boulet	Laval Rocket	64	22	41	63	42
Alex Steeves	Toronto Marlies	59	36	26	62	50
Glenn Gawdin	Ontario Reign	72	26	36	62	57
John Leonard	Charlotte Checkers	72	36	25	61	22

=== Leading goaltenders ===
This is a combined table of the top five goaltenders based on goals against average and the top five goaltenders based on save percentage with at least 1,440 minutes played. The table is initially sorted by goals against average, with the criterion for inclusion in bold. Updated following games played on April 20, 2025.

GP = Games played; TOI = Time on ice (in minutes); SA = Shots against; GA = Goals against; SO = Shutouts; GAA = Goals against average; SV% = Save percentage; W = Wins; L = Losses; OT = Overtime/shootout loss

Player	Team	GP	TOI	SA	GA	SO	GAA	SV%	W	L	OT
Ken Appleby	Charlotte Checkers	24	1,440:20	525	47	6	**1.96**	.910	15	8	1
Cayden Primeau	Laval Rocket	26	1,528:07	686	50	2	**1.96**	**.927**	21	2	2
Michael DiPietro	Providence Bruins	40	2,373:20	1,117	81	4	**2.05**	**.927**	26	8	5
Matt Murray	Milwaukee Admirals	43	2,576:52	1,307	89	4	**2.07**	**.932**	28	10	5
Trent Miner	Colorado Eagles	38	2,259:04	981	80	3	**2.12**	.918	22	10	6
Colten Ellis	Springfield Thunderbirds	42	2,420:20	1,359	106	3	2.63	**.922**	22	14	3
Jet Greaves	Cleveland Monsters	40	2,340:20	1,269	102	3	2.62	**.920**	21	11	6

== Calder Cup playoffs ==
=== Playoff format ===
The AHL will continue to use the same playoff format used since 2022. The playoff field will include the top six finishers in the eight-team Atlantic Division, the top five finishers each in the seven-team North and Central Divisions, and the top seven teams in the 10-team Pacific Division. First Round match-ups will be best-of-three series; the two highest seeds in the Atlantic, the three highest seeds in each of the North and Central, and the first-place team in the Pacific will receive byes into the best-of-five Division Semifinals, with the First Round winners re-seeded in each division. The Division Finals will also be best-of-five series, followed by best-of-seven Conference Finals and a best-of-seven Calder Cup Finals series.

=== Bracket ===
First Round; April 22–27
A3	Providence	2
A6	Springfield	1
A4	Wilkes-Barre/Scranton	0
A5	Lehigh Valley	2
N4	Toronto	0
N5	Cleveland	2
C4	Chicago	0
C5	Rockford	2
P2	Abbotsford	2
P7	Tucson	1
P3	Ontario	0
P6	San Jose	2
P4	Coachella Valley	2
P5	Calgary	0

Division Semifinals; April 25 – May 11
A1	Hershey	3
A5	Lehigh Valley	2
Atlantic Division
A2	Charlotte	3
A3	Providence	2
N1	Laval	3
N5	Cleveland	1
North Division
N2	Rochester	3
N3	Syracuse	0
C1	Milwaukee	3
C5	Rockford	2
Central Division
C2	Texas	3
C3	Grand Rapids	0
P1	Colorado	3
P6	San Jose	1
Pacific Division
P2	Abbotsford	3
P4	Coachella Valley	1

Division Finals; May 14–26
A1	Hershey	0
A2	Charlotte	3
Eastern Conference
N1	Laval	3
N2	Rochester	2
C1	Milwaukee	2
C2	Texas	3
Western Conference
P1	Colorado	2
P2	Abbotsford	3

Conference Finals; May 28 – June 8
A2	Charlotte	4
N1	Laval	0
C2	Texas	2
P2	Abbotsford	4

Calder Cup Finals; June 13–23
A2	Charlotte	2
P2	Abbotsford	4

== AHL awards ==
Award	Winner	Ref
Calder Cup (Playoff champions)	Abbotsford Canucks	
Les Cunningham Award (Regular season MVP)	Andrew Poturalski, San Jose Barracuda	
John B. Sollenberger Trophy (Regular season points leader)	Andrew Poturalski, San Jose Barracuda	
Willie Marshall Award (Regular season goalscoring leader)	Matej Blumel, Texas Stars	
Dudley "Red" Garrett Memorial Award (Rookie of the year)	Justin Hryckowian, Texas Stars	
Eddie Shore Award (Defenceman of the year)	Jacob MacDonald, Colorado Eagles	
Aldege "Baz" Bastien Memorial Award (Goaltender of the year)	Michael DiPietro, Providence Bruins	
Harry "Hap" Holmes Memorial Award (Team with fewest goals against)	Cayden Primeau & Connor Hughes, Laval Rocket; Brandon Halverson & Matt Tomkins, Syracuse Crunch	
Louis A. R. Pieri Memorial Award (Coach of the year)	Pascal Vincent, Laval Rocket	
Fred T. Hunt Memorial Award (Sportsmanship, determination, and dedication to hockey)	Cal O'Reilly, Milwaukee Admirals	
Yanick Dupre Memorial Award (Community service)	Curtis McKenzie, Texas Stars	
Jack A. Butterfield Trophy (Playoff MVP)	Artūrs Šilovs, Abbotsford Canucks	
Richard F. Canning Trophy (Eastern Conference playoff champions)	Charlotte Checkers	
Robert W. Clarke Trophy (Western Conference playoff champions)	Abbotsford Canucks	
Macgregor Kilpatrick Trophy (Regular season champions)	Laval Rocket	
Frank Mathers Trophy (Eastern Conference regular season champions)	Laval Rocket	
Norman R. "Bud" Poile Trophy (Western Conference regular season champions)	Colorado Eagles	
Emile Francis Trophy (Atlantic Division regular season champions)	Hershey Bears	
F. G. "Teddy" Oke Trophy (North Division regular season champions)	Laval Rocket	
Sam Pollock Trophy (Central Division regular season champions)	Milwaukee Admirals	
John D. Chick Trophy (Pacific Division regular season champions)	Colorado Eagles	
James C. Hendy Memorial Award (Executive of the year)	Ryan Snider, Rockford IceHogs	
Thomas Ebright Memorial Award (Career contributions to the AHL)	Tera Black, Charlotte Checkers	
Bruce Landon Award (Outstanding hockey operations executive)	John Sedgwick, Laval Rocket	
James H. Ellery Memorial Awards (Outstanding media coverage)		
Ken McKenzie Award (Marketing and public relations)	Ben Adams, Cleveland Monsters	
Michael Condon Memorial Award (On-ice official)	Tommy George	
President's Awards (Excellence in all areas of the ice)	Laval Rocket (team); Jacob MacDonald (player)	

=== All-Star teams ===
First All-Star Team

- Michael DiPietro (G) – Providence Bruins
- Jacob MacDonald (D) – Colorado Eagles
- Derrick Pouliot (D) – Syracuse Crunch
- Matej Blumel (F) – Texas Stars
- Matthew Peca (F) – Springfield Thunderbirds
- Andrew Poturalski (F) – San Jose Barracuda

Second All-Star Team

- Matt Murray (G) – Milwaukee Admirals
- Ethan Bear (D) – Hershey Bears
- Trevor Carrick (D) – Charlotte Checkers
- Seth Griffith (F) – Bakersfield Condors
- John Leonard (F) – Charlotte Checkers
- Alex Steeves (F) – Toronto Marlies

All-Rookie Team

- Niklas Kokko (G) – Coachella Valley Firebirds
- Luca Cagnoni (D) – San Jose Barracuda
- Tristan Luneau (D) – San Diego Gulls
- Justin Hryckowian (F) – Texas Stars
- Ville Koivunen (F) – Wilkes-Barre/Scranton Penguins
- Bradly Nadeau (F) – Chicago Wolves

Top Prospects Team

- Jet Greaves (G) – Cleveland Monsters
- Logan Mailloux (D) – Laval Rocket
- Scott Morrow (D) – Chicago Wolves
- Dalibor Dvorský (F) – Springfield Thunderbirds
- Konsta Helenius (F) – Rochester Americans
- Bradly Nadeau (F) – Chicago Wolves
