= Great Park Ice & FivePoint Arena =

Ice hockey facility in Irvine, California

- Interactive map of Great Park Ice & FivePoint Arena
- Location: 888 Ridge Valley; Irvine, California 92618
- Coordinates: 33.67761°N 117.74524°W
- Owner: Anaheim Ducks
- Operator: Ice Management, LLC
- Capacity: 2,500 (main arena)
- Surface: 280,000 sq. ft

Construction
- Groundbreaking: 2017
- Opened: 2019
- Cost: $110,000,000 USD
- Architect: LPA

Tenants
- Anaheim Ducks (2019–present); Anaheim Jr. Ducks (2019–present); Anaheim Lady Ducks (2019–present); ADHSHL (Anaheim Ducks High School Hockey League) (2019–present); San Diego Gulls (2021)

Website
- www.greatparkice.com

Great Park Ice & FivePoint Arena is a 2,500 seat (FivePoint Arena) 4 rink (3 NHL and 1 Olympic) ice hockey facility in Irvine, California. It serves as the practice facility of the Anaheim Ducks, after leaving Anaheim Ice. The facility includes a team store, restaurant (Between the Rinks), pro shop, arcade, and other amenities. As one of The Rinks facilities, Great Park Ice offers youth and adult hockey, curling, ice skating lessons, figure skating, and public skating hours. The complex is also surrounded by Orange County Great Park which has other sports facilities.

On March 14, 2020, all Ice Management LLC. facilities, including the Great Park Ice & FivePoint Arena, suspended all operations due to the COVID-19 pandemic. Despite later resuming operations, Anaheim Ice facilities agreed to comply with ongoing California state COVID-19 guidelines in August 2020. As part of the COVID response, the facility has been designated as the temporary home facility for the Ducks' AHL affiliate, San Diego Gulls, for the 2020–21 season instead of their normal home area Pechanga Arena.

Great Park Ice's Logo

== Between The Rinks ==
Great Park Ice features Between The Rink Family Restaurant. Also, on floor 1 is the Between The Rinks Café, which fans can get food before, after, or during a game. The Bar and Restaurant features many Flatscreen TVs showing different games. On one of the walls, there are many different hockey pucks with different logos on them. The restaurant serves varieties of pizza, burgers and sandwiches, beer, wine, tacos, and more. As the name suggests, the Restaurant and bar are located between rinks.

== Notable events ==
Games
Date(s)	Score(s)	Team 1	Team 2	Event name (promoted as)	Notes
December 28–29, 2019	(28) 4 – 1 Harvard Wins	Harvard	ASU	SoCal Clash	This was the first time since the 1999 Frozen Four (held at Honda Center) an NCAA Division I contest was held in Southern California.
December 28–29, 2019	(29) 5 – 4 (OT2) Harvard Wins	Harvard	ASU	SoCal Clash	This was the first time since the 1999 Frozen Four (held at Honda Center) an NCAA Division I contest was held in Southern California.

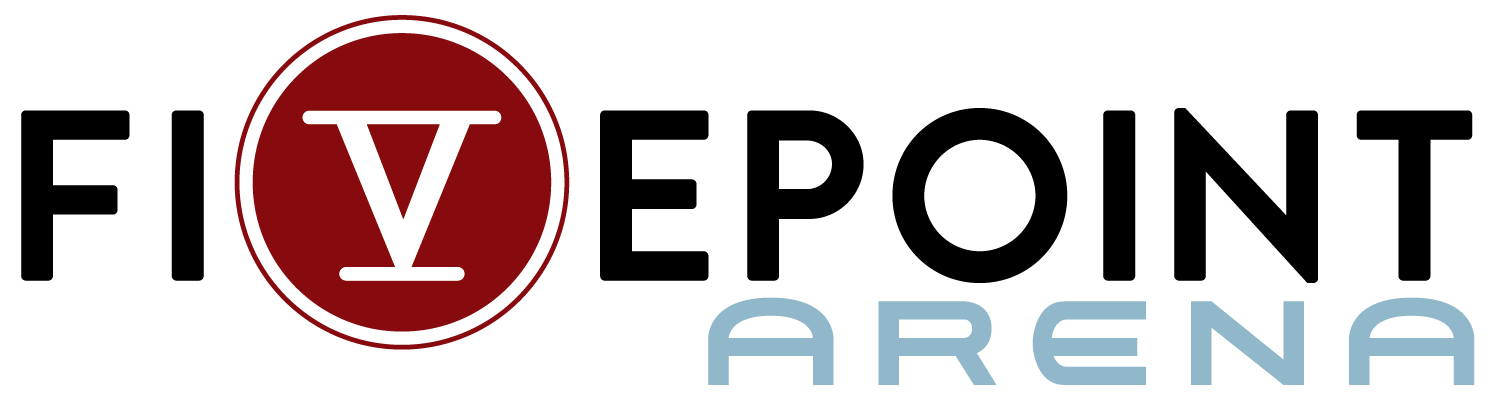
Rink 4 (FivePoint Arena)'s Logo.

Tournaments
Dates	Champion(s)	Event	Notes	Ref.
March 25-29, 2026	TBD (1A, 2A, 3A)	2026 Chipotle-USA Hockey National Championships - Youth 16U II		
November 17–20, 2022	Tier 1 – Boston Bruins	12th annual USA Hockey Sled Classic, presented by the NHL		
November 17–20, 2022	Tier 2 – Pittsburgh Penguins	12th annual USA Hockey Sled Classic, presented by the NHL		
November 17–20, 2022	Tier 3 – Boston Bruins	12th annual USA Hockey Sled Classic, presented by the NHL		
November 17–20, 2022	Tier 4 – Colorado Avalanche	12th annual USA Hockey Sled Classic, presented by the NHL		
November 17–20, 2022	Tier 5 – Chicago Blackhawks	12th annual USA Hockey Sled Classic, presented by the NHL		
September 7–8,10, 2019		2019 Rookie Faceoff	Six of nine games played at FivePoint Arena, the remaining in Rink 3.	
April 4–8, 2019	14U - Pittsburgh Penguins Elite (PA)	2019 Chipotle-USA Hockey Nationals, Girls Tier 1		
April 4–8, 2019	16U - Chicago Mission (IL)	2019 Chipotle-USA Hockey Nationals, Girls Tier 1		
April 4–8, 2019	19U - Boston Jr. Eagles (MA)	2019 Chipotle-USA Hockey Nationals, Girls Tier 1		

=== List of other events ===
- 2017 - Ground broken by Henry Samueli and his wife Susan, also burying a hockey puck in the process.
- 2019 - Ceremony introducing Dallas Eakins as Ducks head coach.
- 2019 - USA Hockey Nationals
- 2019 - Anaheim Ducks Rookie Faceoff
- 2019 - SoCal Clash (see above)
- 2020 - United States women's training camp
- 2020 - Hockey Day SoCal
- 2021 - San Diego Gulls hosted for the 2020–21 AHL season

=== In popular culture ===
FivePoint Arena, its locker rooms, the lobby, and the exterior of Great Park Ice were featured in the second season finale of The Mighty Ducks: Game Changers, a television show based on The Mighty Ducks trilogy. Ducks alternate captain Cam Fowler was featured in the episode along with Anaheim's reverse retro jerseys.

Great Park Ice is the site of the Anaheim Ducks' media day, where videos are recorded for the scoreboard at the Honda Center
