= Anaheim Ice =

Ice rink in Anaheim, California

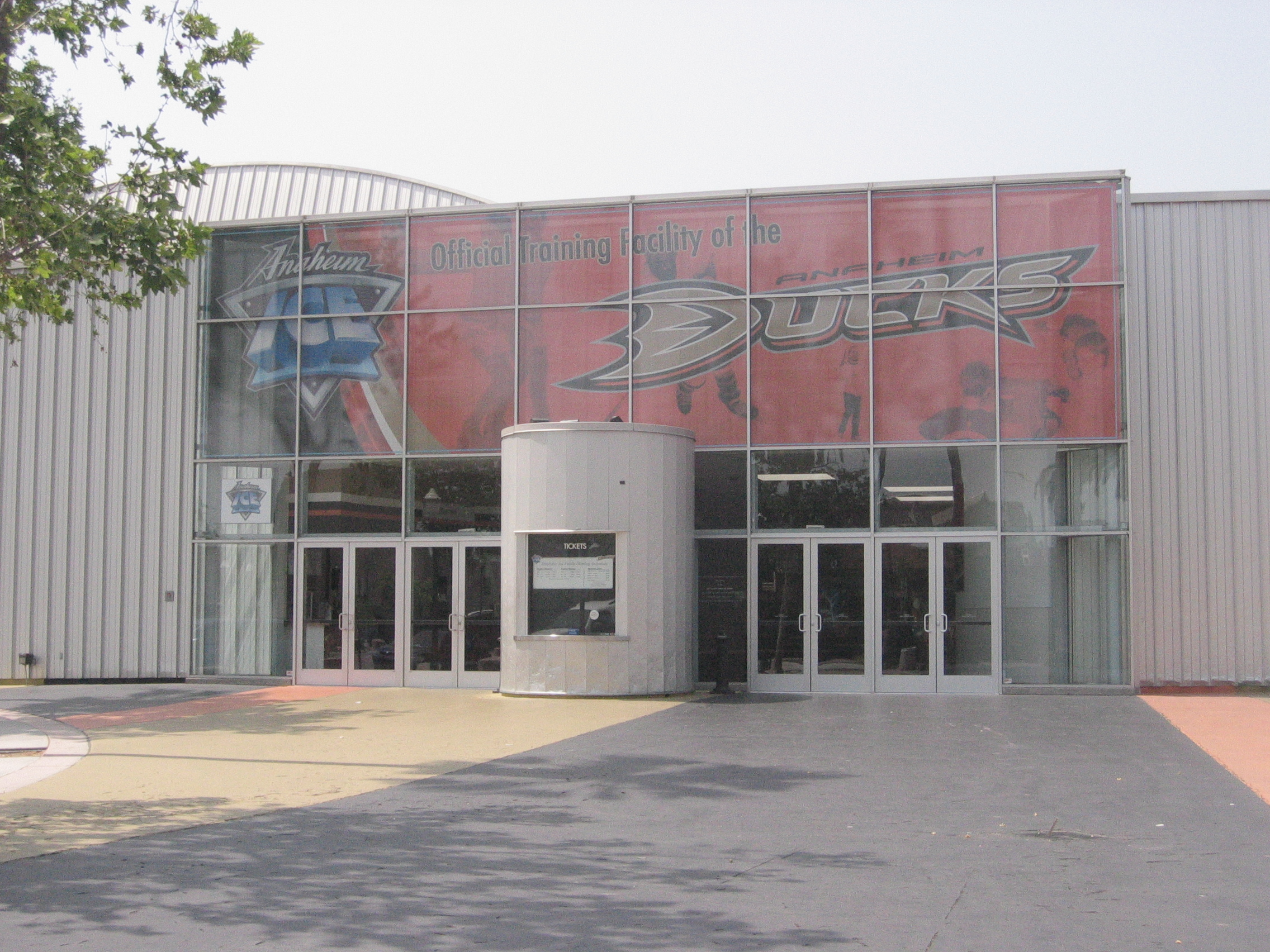
- Interactive map of Anaheim Ice
- Former names: Disney Ice
- Location: 300 West Lincoln Avenue; Anaheim, California
- Coordinates: 33.833907°N 117.917424°W
- Owner: Anaheim Ducks
- Operator: Ice Management, LLC
- Surface: 200' x 85'

Construction
- Opened: 1995
- Architect: Frank Gehry

Tenants
- Anaheim Jr. Ducks; Anaheim Lady Ducks; ADHSHL (Anaheim Ducks High School Hockey League) (2008-present); USC Trojans (PAC-8) (1995–present); Anaheim Ducks (1995-2019)

Website
- Official website

Anaheim Ice, formerly known as Disney Ice, is an indoor ice rink complex in Anaheim, California. It is known for being one of the major works of architect Frank Gehry. It was the practice and training rink of the Anaheim Ducks of the National Hockey League until those operations were moved to Great Park Ice in 2019. Currently, the venue hosts youth hockey, figure skating events, and public skating. Additionally, it serves as the home rink for the University of Southern California club hockey team, and was the site of the 2010 PAC-8 Hockey Conference Tournament, hosted by USC.

== History ==
Disney Ice was commissioned by Disney's then-CEO Michael Eisner, who said, "I was looking for the next generation of American architects -- and he was on the list of architects who were pushing the envelope. We bought a hockey team. We needed a practice rink." The facility resembles a pair of huge quonset huts, and has a wooden interior with laminated beams and braces, producing "a nautical effect that recalls the inverted ship shape of Gehry's Disney Concert Hall". It opened in 1995.

When the Anaheim Ducks (then known as the Mighty Ducks of Anaheim) were sold to Henry Samueli and his wife Susan in 2005, Disney Ice was also sold to the Samuelis, who renamed it Anaheim Ice.

In late 2019, the Ducks relocated their practices to Great Park Ice in Irvine, California.

On March 14, 2020, Anaheim Ice temporarily suspended all operations due to the COVID-19 pandemic. Despite later resuming operations, Anaheim Ice facilities agreed to comply with ongoing California state COVID-19 guidelines in August 2020.

Anaheim Ice served as the site to take the cover of NHL 23, the 2022 version of the NHL series of video games produced by EA Sports. The cover features Anaheim Ducks player Trevor Zegras alongside Sarah Nurse, a member of Hockey Canada.

== See also ==
- List of works by Frank Gehry
