= Seth Griffith =

Canadian ice hockey player (born 1993)

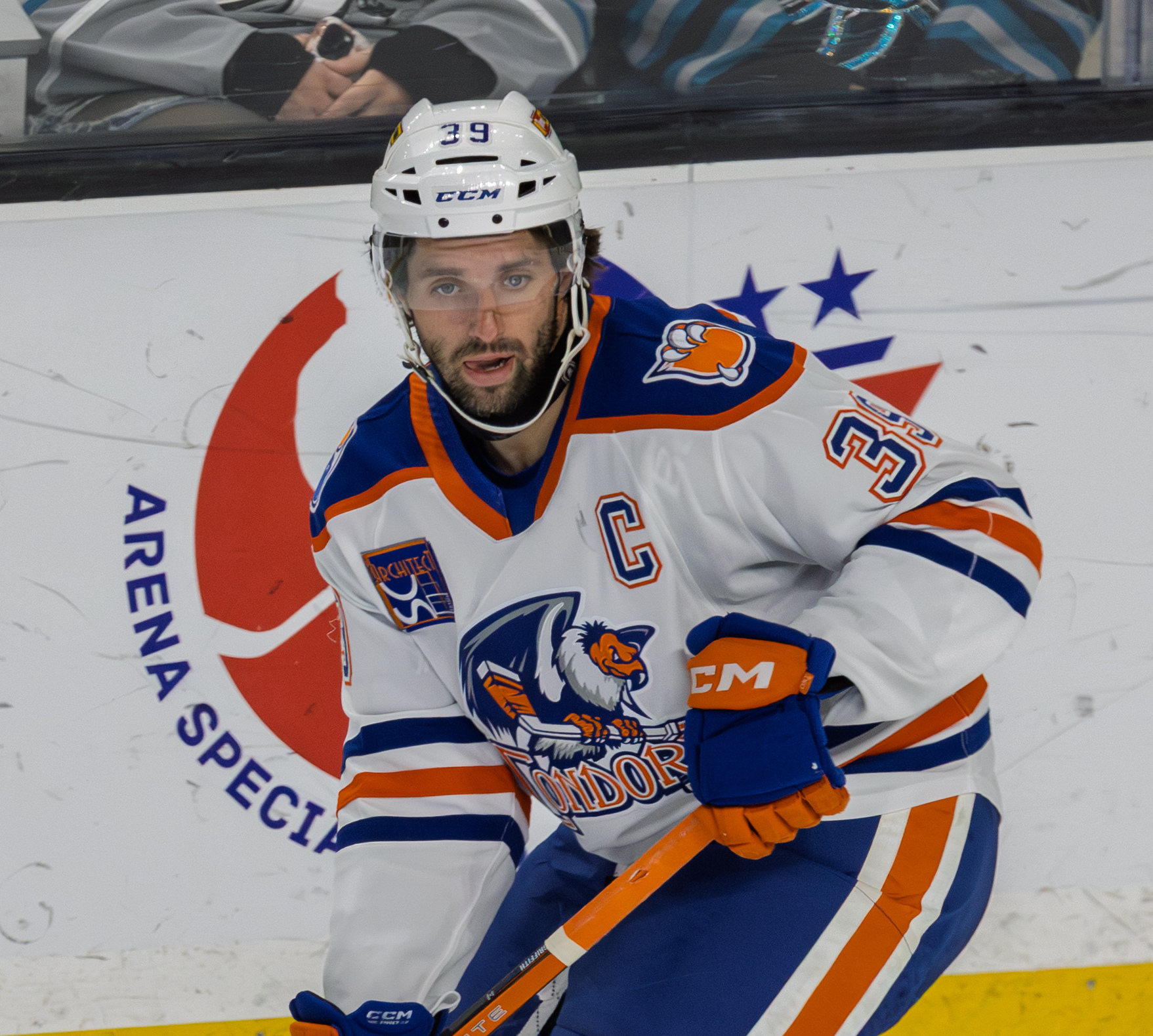
- Griffith with the Bakersfield Condors in 2026
- Born: January 4, 1993 (age 33) Wallaceburg, Ontario, Canada
- Height: 5 ft 9 in (175 cm)
- Weight: 190 lb (86 kg; 13 st 8 lb)
- Position: Centre
- Shoots: Right
- AHL team Former teams: Bakersfield Condors; Boston Bruins; Toronto Maple Leafs; Florida Panthers; Buffalo Sabres; Edmonton Oilers
- NHL draft: 131st overall, 2012; Boston Bruins
- Playing career: 2013–present

Seth Griffith (born January 4, 1993) is a Canadian professional ice hockey forward for the Bakersfield Condors of the American Hockey League (AHL). He was selected by the Boston Bruins in the fifth round (131st overall) of the 2012 NHL entry draft.

== Playing career ==
Griffith played major junior hockey with the London Knights of the Ontario Hockey League. With the team, he would win two consecutive OHL Championships and thus participate in two Memorial Cup tournaments. Griffith was rewarded for his outstanding play during the 2012–13 season by being named to the OHL's First All-Star Team, one year after he was named to the Second All-Star team.

Griffith's first career NHL goal was scored on October 21, 2014 against San Jose Sharks's goaltender Antti Niemi.

Griffith dominated at the AHL level ever since debuting in 2013–14 season. Having recorded at nearly or over a point-a-game in all seasons since, he experienced a phenomenal 2015–16 season which saw him finish second in league scoring (as well as first in assists) and was named to the AHL First All-Star team. In total, he recorded 77 points in 57 games played. In reward for this, he was signed to a one-year, two-way contract extension on May 24, 2016.

On the eve of the 2016–17 season, Griffith was claimed off of waivers by the Toronto Maple Leafs on October 11, 2016, after he was placed on waivers the previous day. Leafs assistant general manager Mark Hunter and his team was responsible for the pick-up; Hunter have previously worked with Griffith within the London Knights organization. Griffith appeared in 3 games with the Maple Leafs, however largely served as a healthy scratch over the first month of the season. On November 12, 2016, Griffith's brief tenure with the Maple Leafs ended after he was again claimed off waivers, by the Florida Panthers. Griffith was inserted in the Panthers scoring line, however after a positive start, found a reduced role with 5 assists in 21 games. On January 19, 2017, Griffith was again placed on waivers and was re-claimed by the Maple Leafs for a second time. With the Leafs the only team vying for his services, Griffith was directly assigned to AHL affiliate, the Toronto Marlies on January 20, 2017. He would remain with the Marlies for the rest of the season, playing at a pace of over a point-per-game.

On July 1, 2017, Griffith signed a one-year, one-way $650,000 contract as a free agent with the Buffalo Sabres. Griffith made the Sabres opening night roster for the 2017–18 season, however was unable to take his opportunity, producing just 2 goals in 21 games in a depth role. He was assigned to AHL affiliate, the Rochester Americans, throughout the season, posting 41 points in 46 games.

As a free agent from the Sabres, Griffith joined the Winnipeg Jets on a one-year, two-way $650,000 contract on July 1, 2018.

After two seasons within the Jets organization playing primarily for AHL affiliate, the Manitoba Moose, Griffith left as a free agent and agreed to sign a two-year, two-way contract with the Edmonton Oilers on October 9, 2020. He appeared in one game with the Oilers in the 2021–22 season, but become a core piece of the Oilers' AHL affiliate Bakersfield Condors, eventually being named team captain. He was an AHL Second Team All-Star in both the 2021–22 and 2024–25 seasons.

== Career statistics ==
=== Regular season and playoffs ===
			Regular season					Playoffs
Season	Team	League	GP	G	A	Pts	PIM	GP	G	A	Pts	PIM
2008–09	Chatham Maroons	GOJHL	1	0	0	0	0	—	—	—	—	—
2009–10	St. Marys Lincolns	GOJHL	49	43	35	78	56	5	6	3	9	4
2009–10	London Knights	OHL	17	2	1	3	2	10	4	3	7	2
2010–11	London Knights	OHL	68	22	40	62	28	6	3	4	7	6
2011–12	London Knights	OHL	68	45	40	85	49	19	10	13	23	12
2012–13	London Knights	OHL	54	33	48	81	52	21	9	16	25	14
2013–14	Providence Bruins	AHL	69	20	30	50	28	12	4	7	11	8
2014–15	Providence Bruins	AHL	39	12	19	31	12	5	2	3	5	0
2014–15	Boston Bruins	NHL	30	6	4	10	6	—	—	—	—	—
2015–16	Providence Bruins	AHL	57	24	53	77	32	3	1	2	3	6
2015–16	Boston Bruins	NHL	4	0	1	1	4	—	—	—	—	—
2016–17	Toronto Maple Leafs	NHL	3	0	0	0	0	—	—	—	—	—
2016–17	Florida Panthers	NHL	21	0	5	5	8	—	—	—	—	—
2016–17	Toronto Marlies	AHL	38	10	34	44	36	11	2	7	9	4
2017–18	Buffalo Sabres	NHL	21	2	1	3	6	—	—	—	—	—
2017–18	Rochester Americans	AHL	46	15	26	41	26	3	0	4	4	4
2018–19	Manitoba Moose	AHL	69	16	41	57	30	—	—	—	—	—
2019–20	Manitoba Moose	AHL	58	21	20	41	28	—	—	—	—	—
2020–21	Bakersfield Condors	AHL	39	10	18	28	8	6	3	4	7	10
2021–22	Bakersfield Condors	AHL	64	30	50	80	54	5	1	1	2	4
2021–22	Edmonton Oilers	NHL	1	0	0	0	0	—	—	—	—	—
2022–23	Bakersfield Condors	AHL	72	17	43	60	32	2	0	0	0	14
2023–24	Bakersfield Condors	AHL	68	15	48	63	32	2	1	1	2	0
2024–25	Bakersfield Condors	AHL	65	21	51	72	46	—	—	—	—	—
2025–26	Bakersfield Condors	AHL	71	18	49	67	50	3	2	3	5	2
NHL totals			80	8	11	19	24	—	—	—	—	—

=== International ===
Year	Team	Event	Result	GP	G	A	Pts	PIM
2011	Canada	U18	4th	7	0	0	0	6
Junior totals				7	0	0	0	6

== Awards and honours ==
Honours	Year
GOJHL
First All-Star Team	2009–10
Most points by a rookie	2009–10
Rookie All-Star Team	2009–10
Rookie of the Year	2009–10
OHL
J. Ross Robertson Cup Champion	2011–12
Second All-Star Team	2011–12
J. Ross Robertson Cup Champion	2012–13
First All-Star Team	2012–13
Jim Mahon Memorial Trophy	2012–13
AHL
All-Star Game	2015–16
First All-Star Team	2015–16
Player of the Month (December)	2015–16
Second All-Star Team	2021–22, 2024–25
