= 2020–21 AHL season =

- League: American Hockey League
- Sport: Ice hockey
- Duration: February 5 – May 20, 2021

Regular season
- Macgregor Kilpatrick Trophy: Hershey Bears
- Season MVP: T. J. Tynan (Colorado)
- Top scorer: Andrew Poturalski (San Diego)

AHL seasons
- 2019–20 2021–22

The 2020–21 AHL season was the 85th season of the American Hockey League. Due to the ongoing restrictions in the COVID-19 pandemic, the start of the regular season was pushed back to February 5, 2021, and the league's playoff tournament championship Calder Cup was not awarded for the second consecutive season. The AHL's regular-season Macgregor Kilpatrick Trophy would become the league's primary trophy, which was the Hershey Bears's eighth regular-season championship. This was the first season under Scott Howson as the league's president after David Andrews announced his retirement after 26 years in the position.

== League changes ==
After the previous season was curtailed due to the COVID-19 pandemic, there was no certainty for the AHL's 2020–21 season due to continuing limitations on arena capacities and traveling during the pandemic. The league had originally hoped to start play by December 4, 2020, but was later pushed back to at least February 5, 2021. Similar to the National Hockey League, the league was reportedly exploring the option of playing with an all-Canada division due to increased border travel restrictions between the United States and Canada.

On January 4, 2021, the league announced its plans and divisional alignment for the shortened season. The four Canadian teams were placed in their own division with a season start date still pending provincial approval. Three teams opted out of the season entirely: the Charlotte Checkers, Milwaukee Admirals, and the Springfield Thunderbirds. Seven teams temporarily relocated to be closer to their parent teams or due to venue availability during the pandemic: the Belleville Senators to Ottawa; the Binghamton Devils to Newark, New Jersey; the Laval Rocket to Montreal; the Ontario Reign to El Segundo, California; the Providence Bruins to Marlborough, Massachusetts; the San Diego Gulls to Irvine, California; and the Stockton Heat to Calgary. The San Jose Barracuda also opened their season with home games in Tucson before returning to San Jose.

The schedule for the American divisions was released on January 22; however, the Canadian teams had not yet received provincial clearance. Stockton then moved from the Pacific to the Canadian Division on January 28 causing scheduling changes to the Pacific Division. On February 1, the league announced a revised schedule and that the start of the season for the Canadian Division had been postponed. The beginning of the Canadian schedule was released on February 9 with a February 12 start date, but the two Ontario teams still did not have approval to play at home.

The league allowed each division the choice to hold a divisional postseason. On April 29, it was announced that only the Pacific Division had elected to hold a postseason tournament to name a division champion, with the other four divisions awarding their champions via regular season records. Consequently, the league would not award the Calder Cup for a second consecutive season.

=== Team and NHL affiliation changes ===
==== Relocations ====
- The San Antonio Rampage franchise was purchased by the National Hockey League's Vegas Golden Knights and relocated to the Las Vegas area. The team became the Henderson Silver Knights playing out of Orleans Arena in Paradise, Nevada, with plans to move into a new venue in nearby Henderson, Nevada, upon completion.

==== Hiatus ====
Due to the COVID-19 pandemic, three teams chose to not participate in the season.

- Charlotte Checkers
- Milwaukee Admirals
- Springfield Thunderbirds

==== Affiliation changes ====
| AHL team | New affiliate | Previous affiliate |
|---|---|---|
| Charlotte Checkers (Note: Primary affiliation prior to team opting out of the season.) | Florida Panthers | Carolina Hurricanes |
| Chicago Wolves | Carolina Hurricanes | Vegas Golden Knights |
| Henderson Silver Knights (Note: Affiliation change as the San Antonio Rampage) | Vegas Golden Knights | St. Louis Blues |
| Springfield Thunderbirds | St. Louis Blues | Florida Panthers |
| AHL team | Primary affiliate | New secondary affiliate (Note: Due to three teams opting out of the season, temporary dual NHL affiliations were permitted) |
| Chicago Wolves | Carolina Hurricanes | Nashville Predators |
| Syracuse Crunch | Tampa Bay Lightning | Florida Panthers |
| Utica Comets | Vancouver Canucks | St. Louis Blues |

=== Coaching changes ===
Off–season
| Team | 2019–20 coach | 2020–21 coach | Notes |
|---|---|---|---|
| Charlotte Checkers | Ryan Warsofsky | Geordie Kinnear | Warsofsky left the Checkers for the Chicago Wolves when the Carolina Hurricanes switched affiliations. Warsofsky had coached the Checkers for one season and 34–22–5–0 record after coming from the ECHL's South Carolina Stingrays. After the Checkers affiliated with the Florida Panthers, Kinnear was named the new head coach on September 28, 2020, after serving in the same position with the Panthers' previous affiliate, the Springfield Thunderbirds. Kinnear had previously served as an assistant coach in Charlotte from 2010 to 2016. |
| Chicago Wolves | Rocky Thompson | Ryan Warsofsky | Thompson left the Wolves on July 18, 2020, after three seasons and a 113–71–18–11 record to join the San Jose Sharks coaching staff. Warsofsky was brought to the Wolves by their new NHL affiliate, the Carolina Hurricanes in September 2020. |
| Henderson Silver Knights | Drew Bannister | Emanuel Viveiros | Bannister stayed with the Blues' organization when the Rampage franchise was relocated by the Vegas Golden Knights to Henderson. Viveiros was named the Silver Knights' first head coach on August 31, 2020, after serving as the head coach of the Spokane Chiefs in the Western Hockey League with a 41–18–4–1 record. |
| Ontario Reign | Mike Stothers | John Wroblewski | On May 30, 2020, the Los Angeles Kings announced that they would not renew Stothers' contract as head coach of the Reign. Wroblewski was hired on August 17, 2020. |
| Rochester Americans | Chris Taylor | Seth Appert | On June 16, 2020, the Buffalo Sabres fired the entire Americans' coaching staff including Taylor. Appert was hired on August 14, 2020. |
| San Jose Barracuda | Jimmy Bonneau; Michael Chiasson | Roy Sommer | Sommer was called up as an associate coach for the San Jose Sharks during the previous season after serving as the head coach of the Sharks' AHL affiliate since first being named to the position with the Kentucky Thoroughblades on May 28, 1998. Assistant coaches Bonneau and Chiasson were named as co-coaches of the Barracuda until the end of the season when Sommer was sent back to the Barracuda. |
| Springfield Thunderbirds | Geordie Kinnear | Drew Bannister | Kinnear left the Thunderbirds after their affiliate, the Florida Panthers, changed their affiliation to the Charlotte Checkers. Kinnear had led the Thunderbirds since 2016 and a 128–126–26–9 record. Bannister was brought on as the new head coach from the San Antonio Rampage, the former St. Louis Blues' affiliate that was sold and relocated as the Henderson Silver Knights. |
| Tucson Roadrunners | Jay Varady | Steve Potvin | Prior to the postponed start of the season, Roadrunners' head coach Jay Varady was brought up to the Arizona Coyotes' staff as an assistant coach and Roadrunners' assistant coach Steve Potvin was promoted as the head coach. |
| Wilkes-Barre/Scranton Penguins | Mike Vellucci | J. D. Forrest | On September 2, 2020, Vellucci was promoted to an assistant coach position with the Pittsburgh Penguins. On September 11, Forrest was named head coach after serving as an assistant coach for the WBS Penguins since August 2016. |

== Final standings ==
y– indicates team clinched regular season division title

Final standings as of May 20, 2021

| Atlantic Division | GP | W | L | OTL | SOL | Pts | Pts% | GF | GA |
|---|---|---|---|---|---|---|---|---|---|
| y–Providence Bruins (BOS) | 25 | 15 | 6 | 2 | 2 | 32 | .680 | 78 | 60 |
| Hartford Wolf Pack (NYR) | 24 | 14 | 9 | 1 | 0 | 29 | .604 | 82 | 74 |
| Bridgeport Sound Tigers (NYI) | 24 | 8 | 14 | 2 | 0 | 18 | .375 | 59 | 81 |

| Canadian Division | GP | W | L | OTL | SOL | Pts | Pts% | GF | GA |
|---|---|---|---|---|---|---|---|---|---|
| y–Laval Rocket (MTL) | 36 | 23 | 9 | 3 | 1 | 50 | .694 | 113 | 87 |
| Manitoba Moose (WPG) | 36 | 18 | 13 | 3 | 2 | 41 | .569 | 109 | 102 |
| Belleville Senators (OTT) | 35 | 18 | 16 | 1 | 0 | 37 | .529 | 102 | 111 |
| Toronto Marlies (TOR) | 35 | 16 | 17 | 0 | 2 | 34 | .486 | 111 | 119 |
| Stockton Heat (CGY) | 30 | 11 | 17 | 2 | 0 | 24 | .400 | 79 | 95 |

| North Division | GP | W | L | OTL | SOL | Pts | Pts% | GF | GA |
|---|---|---|---|---|---|---|---|---|---|
| y–Hershey Bears (WSH) | 33 | 24 | 7 | 2 | 0 | 50 | .758 | 110 | 77 |
| Lehigh Valley Phantoms (PHI) | 32 | 18 | 7 | 4 | 2 | 43 (Note: The March 10 game between Lehigh Valley and Binghamton was suspended after one period with the teams tied 1–1 due a player testing positive for COVID-19. The game was declared a draw with each team earning one point.) | .672 | 96 | 92 |
| Syracuse Crunch (FLA/TBL) | 32 | 19 | 10 | 3 | 0 | 41 | .641 | 120 | 93 |
| Utica Comets (STL/VAN) | 28 | 16 | 11 | 0 | 1 | 33 | .589 | 89 | 88 |
| Wilkes-Barre/Scranton Penguins (PIT) | 32 | 13 | 13 | 4 | 2 | 32 | .500 | 92 | 107 |
| Rochester Americans (BUF) | 29 | 11 | 15 | 2 | 1 | 25 | .431 | 89 | 116 |
| Binghamton Devils (NJD) | 35 | 7 | 20 | 5 | 2 | 22 | .314 | 89 | 127 |

| Central Division | GP | W | L | OTL | SOL | Pts | Pts% | GF | GA |
|---|---|---|---|---|---|---|---|---|---|
| y–Chicago Wolves (CAR/NSH) | 33 | 21 | 9 | 1 | 2 | 45 | .682 | 132 | 94 |
| Cleveland Monsters (CBJ) | 29 | 16 | 10 | 1 | 2 | 35 | .603 | 101 | 86 |
| Grand Rapids Griffins (DET) | 32 | 16 | 12 | 3 | 1 | 36 | .563 | 96 | 97 |
| Iowa Wild (MIN) | 34 | 17 | 13 | 4 | 0 | 38 | .559 | 107 | 113 |
| Texas Stars (DAL) | 38 | 17 | 18 | 3 | 0 | 37 | .487 | 117 | 124 |
| Rockford IceHogs (CHI) | 32 | 12 | 19 | 1 | 0 | 25 | .391 | 89 | 115 |

| Pacific Division | GP | W | L | OTL | SOL | Pts | Pts% | GF | GA |
|---|---|---|---|---|---|---|---|---|---|
| y–Henderson Silver Knights (VGK) | 39 | 25 | 13 | 0 | 1 | 51 | .654 | 125 | 102 |
| Bakersfield Condors (EDM) | 39 | 24 | 14 | 0 | 1 | 49 | .628 | 129 | 104 |
| San Diego Gulls (ANA) | 44 | 26 | 17 | 1 | 0 | 53 | .602 | 153 | 142 |
| San Jose Barracuda (SJS) | 36 | 15 | 15 | 4 | 2 | 36 | .500 | 105 | 127 |
| Colorado Eagles (COL) | 34 | 15 | 15 | 3 | 1 | 34 | .500 | 101 | 104 |
| Ontario Reign (LAK) | 40 | 17 | 19 | 4 | 0 | 38 | .475 | 136 | 149 |
| Tucson Roadrunners (ARI) | 36 | 13 | 20 | 3 | 0 | 29 | .403 | 103 | 126 |

== Statistical leaders ==
=== Leading skaters ===
The following players are sorted by points, then goals. Final as of May 20, 2021.

GP = Games played; G = Goals; A = Assists; Pts = Points; +/– = P Plus–minus; PIM = Penalty minutes

| Player | Team | GP | G | A | Pts | PIM |
|---|---|---|---|---|---|---|
| Andrew Poturalski | San Diego Gulls | 44 | 9 | 34 | 43 | 10 |
| Cooper Marody | Bakersfield Condors | 39 | 21 | 15 | 36 | 18 |
| Danny O'Regan | Henderson Silver Knights | 37 | 16 | 20 | 36 | 4 |
| Riley Damiani | Texas Stars | 36 | 11 | 25 | 36 | 18 |
| Tyler Benson | Bakersfield Condors | 36 | 10 | 26 | 36 | 30 |
| Chase De Leo | San Diego Gulls | 37 | 15 | 20 | 35 | 18 |
| T. J. Tynan | Colorado Eagles | 27 | 8 | 27 | 35 | 12 |
| Riley Barber | Grand Rapids Griffins | 32 | 20 | 14 | 34 | 22 |
| Adam Mascherin | Texas Stars | 37 | 18 | 16 | 34 | 14 |
| Boris Katchouk | Syracuse Crunch | 29 | 11 | 23 | 34 | 18 |

=== Leading goaltenders ===
The following goaltenders with a minimum 660 minutes played lead the league in goals against average. Final as of May 20, 2021.

GP = Games played; TOI = Time on ice (in minutes); SA = Shots against; GA = Goals against; SO = Shutouts; GAA = Goals against average; SV% = Save percentage; W = Wins; L = Losses; OT = Overtime/shootout loss

| Player | Team | GP | TOI | SA | GA | SO | GAA | SV% | W | L | OT |
|---|---|---|---|---|---|---|---|---|---|---|---|
| Zachary Fucale | Hershey Bears | 11 | 665:36 | 294 | 20 | 1 | 1.80 | .932 | 9 | 2 | 0 |
| Logan Thompson | Henderson Silver Knights | 23 | 1349:37 | 768 | 44 | 2 | 1.96 | .943 | 16 | 6 | 1 |
| Cayden Primeau | Laval Rocket | 16 | 914:03 | 350 | 32 | 2 | 2.10 | .909 | 11 | 4 | 0 |
| Alex D'Orio | Wilkes-Barre/Scranton Penguins | 11 | 661:06 | 281 | 24 | 0 | 2.18 | .915 | 6 | 3 | 1 |
| Zane McIntyre | Lehigh Valley Phantoms | 19 | 1079:45 | 505 | 42 | 1 | 2.33 | .917 | 11 | 3 | 3 |

== Calder Cup playoffs ==
2021 Calder Cup playoffs

For the second consecutive season, there was no Calder Cup playoffs. The teams in the Pacific Division held a postseason tournament to name a division champion. All seven Pacific teams participated, with the bottom four teams participating in a single-elimination play-in series to face the top seed in the division semifinal. The semifinals and finals were both best-of-three series.

=== Pacific Division playoff ===
Final results:

Play-in games (May 18)
4 | San Jose Barracuda | 2
7 | Tucson Roadrunners | 1
5 | Colorado Eagles | 5 (OT)
6 | Ontario Reign | 4

Play-in final game (May 19)
4 | San Jose Barracuda | 5
5 | Colorado Eagles | 1

Semifinals (best-of-3)
1 | Henderson Silver Knights | 2
4 | San Jose Barracuda | 0
2 | Bakersfield Condors | 2
3 | San Diego Gulls | 1

Finals (best-of-3)
1 | Henderson Silver Knights | 1
2 | Bakersfield Condors | 2

== Play-in games ==
Note 1: All times are in Eastern Time (UTC−4).
Note 2: Game times in italics signify games to be played only if necessary.
Note 3: Home team is listed first.

=== (4) San Jose Barracuda vs. (7) Tucson Roadrunners ===
| May 18 | San Jose Barracuda | 2 – 1 | Tucson Roadrunners | Great Park Ice & FivePoint Arena |
| No scoring | | First period | No scoring |
| 11:24 - Evan Weinger (1) | | Second period | Jan Jenik (1) - 3:01 |
| 9:18 - Jake McGrew (1) | | Third period | No scoring |
| Josef Korenar (19 saves / 20 shots) | | Goalie stats | Ivan Prosvetov (18 saves / 20 shots) |

=== (5) Colorado Eagles vs. (6) Ontario Reign ===
| May 18 | Colorado Eagles | 5 – 4 | OT | Ontario Reign | Great Park Ice & FivePoint Arena |
| 1:38 - Keaton Middleton (1) | | First period | | Akil Thomas (1) - 3:22; Lias Andersson (1) - pp - 7:58 |
| 14:36 - T.J. Tynan (1); 18:57 - pp - Riley Woods (1) | | Second period | | No scoring |
| 11:13 - sh - Keaton Middleton (2) | | Third period | | Mikey Eyssimont (1) - sh - 3:16; Martin Frk (1) - pp - 5:05 |
| 9:00 - Justin Barron (1) | | First overtime period | | No scoring |
| Adam Werner (27 saves / 31 shots) | | Goalie stats | | Matt Villalta (24 saves / 29 shots) |

== Play-in final game ==
=== (4) San Jose Barracuda vs. (5) Colorado Eagles ===
| May 19 | San Jose Barracuda | 5 – 1 | Colorado Eagles | Great Park Ice & FivePoint Arena |
| 14:10 - Maxim Letunov (1) | | First period | No scoring |
| 9:25 - Zach Gallant (1); 12:36 - Krystof Hrabik (1) | | Second period | Sampo Ranta (1) - pp - 17:47 |
| 17:20 - en - Nicolas Meloche (1); 18:58 - en - Krystof Hrabik (2) | | Third period | No scoring |
| Josef Korenar (32 saves / 33 shots) | | Goalie stats | Justus Annunen (30 saves / 33 shots) |

== Semifinals ==
=== (1) Henderson Silver Knights vs. (4) San Jose Barracuda ===
| May 21 | Henderson Silver Knights | 4 – 1 | San Jose Barracuda | Orleans Arena |
| 8:20 - Jack Dugan (1) | | First period | Jayden Halbgewachs (1) - 15:02 |
| 10:19 - Pavel Dorofeyev (1) | | Second period | No scoring |
| 18:32 - en - Jack Dugan (2); 19:39 - en - Jack Dugan (3) | | Third period | No scoring |
| Logan Thompson (22 saves / 23 shots) | | Goalie stats | Josef Korenar (30 saves / 32 shots) |

| May 22 | San Jose Barracuda | 2 – 4 | Henderson Silver Knights | Orleans Arena |
| Jake McGrew (2) - 0:40 | | First period | 12:26 - sh - Gage Quinney (1) |
| Maxim Letunov (2) - pp - 6:24 | | Second period | 1:59 - Tomas Jurco (1); 4:47 - sh - Danny O'Regan (1); 9:06 - pp - Danny O’Regan (2) |
| No scoring | | Third period | No scoring |
| Josef Korenar (24 saves / 28 shots) | | Goalie stats | Logan Thompson (30 saves / 32 shots) |

| Henderson won series 2–0 |

=== (2) Bakersfield Condors vs. (3) San Diego Gulls ===
| May 21 | Bakersfield Condors | 3 – 5 | San Diego Gulls | Mechanics Bank Arena |
| No scoring | | First period | Sam Carrick (1) - pp - 15:24 |
| No scoring | | Second period | Sam Carrick (2) - pp - 3:10; Vinni Lettieri (1) - pp - 18:43 |
| 9:34 - pp - Brad Malone (1); 10:26 - pp - Seth Griffith (1); 17:29 - Tyler Benson (1) | | Third period | Andrew Agozzino (1) - 14:58; Trevor Zegras (1) - en - 19:56 |
| Stuart Skinner (26 saves / 30 shots) | | Goalie stats | Lukas Dostal (39 saves / 42 shots) |

| May 23 | San Diego Gulls | 2 – 3 | OT | Bakersfield Condors | Mechanics Bank Arena |
| Benoit-Olivier Groulx (1) - 8:21 | | First period | | 11:39 - Cooper Marody (1); 15:07 - Trevor Carrick (1) |
| No scoring | | Second period | | No scoring |
| No scoring | | Third period | | 12:40 - Luke Esposito (1) |
| No scoring | | First overtime period | | 0:49 - Seth Griffith (2) |
| Lukas Dostal (34 saves / 37 shots) | | Goalie stats | | Stuart Skinner (31 saves / 33 shots) |

| May 22 | Bakersfield Condors | 2 – 1 | OT | San Diego Gulls | Mechanics Bank Arena |
| No scoring | | First period | | 7:42 - Andrew Agozzino (2) |
| Adam Cracknell (1) - 12:18 | | Second period | | No scoring |
| No scoring | | Third period | | No scoring |
| Brad Malone (2) - 7:36 | | First overtime period | | No scoring |
| Stuart Skinner (20 saves / 21 shots) | | Goalie stats | | Lukas Dostal (43 saves / 45 shots) |

| Bakersfield won series 2–1 |

== Finals ==
=== (1) Henderson Silver Knights vs. (2) Bakersfield Condors ===
| May 26 | Henderson Silver Knights | 2 – 3 | OT | Bakersfield Condors | T-Mobile Arena |
| No scoring | | First period | | Adam Cracknell (2) - 9:23 |
| No scoring | | Second period | | No scoring |
| 6:54 - Ben Jones (1); 13:12 - Pavel Dorofeyev (2) | | Third period | | Seth Griffith (3) - 8:17 |
| No scoring | | First overtime period | | Adam Cracknell (3) - 11:21 |
| Logan Thompson (35 saves / 38 shots) | | Goalie stats | | Stuart Skinner (25 saves / 27 shots) |

| May 27 | Bakersfield Condors | 3 – 6 | Henderson Silver Knights | T-Mobile Arena |
| No scoring | | First period | 7:50 - Dylan Sikura (1); 10:19 - Jonas Rondbjerg (1); 15:57 - Dylan Sikura (2); 19:24 - sh - Jonas Rondbjerg (2) |
| Raphael Lavoie (1) - 12:45 | | Second period | 14:56 - Maxim Marushev (1); 15:36 - Ostap Safin (1) |
| Tyler Benson (2) - pp - 17:43 | | Third period | 19:08 - pp - en - Danny O'Regan (3) |
| Stuart Skinner (11 saves / 15 shots); Olivier Rodrigue (13 saves / 14 shots) | | Goalie stats | Logan Thompson (21 saves / 24 shots) |

| May 29 | Henderson Silver Knights | 2 – 3 | Bakersfield Condors | T-Mobile Arena |
| No scoring | | First period | No scoring |
| Dylan Sikura (3) - 3:37 | | Second period | 12:31 - Jakob Stukel (1); 15:09 - Phil Kemp (1) |
| Kaedan Korczak (1) - 5:40 | | Third period | 8:51 - Tyler Benson (3) |
| Logan Thompson (29 saves / 32 shots) | | Goalie stats | Stuart Skinner (33 saves / 35 shots) |

| Bakersfield won series 2–1 |

== AHL awards ==
| Award | Winner |
|---|---|
| Calder Cup | Not awarded |
| Les Cunningham Award | T. J. Tynan, Colorado Eagles |
| John B. Sollenberger Trophy | Andrew Poturalski, San Diego Gulls |
| Willie Marshall Award | Cooper Marody, Bakersfield Condors |
| Dudley "Red" Garrett Memorial Award | Riley Damiani, Texas Stars |
| Eddie Shore Award | Ryan Murphy, Henderson Silver Knights |
| Aldege "Baz" Bastien Memorial Award | Logan Thompson, Henderson Silver Knights |
| Harry "Hap" Holmes Memorial Award | Pheonix Copley and Zachary Fucale, Hershey Bears |
| Louis A. R. Pieri Memorial Award | Spencer Carbery, Hershey Bears |
| Fred T. Hunt Memorial Award | Cal O'Reilly, Lehigh Valley Phantoms |
| Yanick Dupre Memorial Award | All 31 teams' athletic trainers |
| Jack A. Butterfield Trophy | Not awarded |
| Richard F. Canning Trophy | Not awarded |
| Robert W. Clarke Trophy | Not awarded |
| Macgregor Kilpatrick Trophy | Hershey Bears |
| Frank Mathers Trophy (Canadian Division regular season champion) | Laval Rocket |
| Emile Francis Trophy (Atlantic Division regular season champion) | Providence Bruins |
| F. G. "Teddy" Oke Trophy (North Division regular season champion) | Hershey Bears |
| Sam Pollock Trophy (Central Division regular season champion) | Chicago Wolves |
| John D. Chick Trophy (Pacific Division tournament champion) | Bakersfield Condors |
| Norman R. "Bud" Poile Trophy | Not awarded |
| James C. Hendy Memorial Award | Melissa Caruso, AHL |
| Thomas Ebright Memorial Award | Jon Gustafson, San Jose Barracuda |
| James H. Ellery Memorial Awards | Tony Brown, Cleveland Monsters |
| Ken McKenzie Award | Zack Fisch, Hershey Bears |
| Michael Condon Memorial Award | Tim Mayer |
| President's Awards | |

=== All-star teams ===
Instead of the traditional first and second all-star teams, the league named an all-star team for each division in addition to the annual all-rookie team.

==== Atlantic Division ====
- Jeremy Swayman (G) – Providence
- Samuel Bolduc (D) – Bridgeport
- Tarmo Reunanen (D) – Hartford
- Morgan Barron (F) – Hartford
- Cameron Hughes (F) – Providence
- Jakub Lauko (F) – Providence

==== Canadian Division ====
- Cayden Primeau (G) – Laval
- Otto Leskinen (D) – Laval
- Connor Mackey (D) – Stockton
- Kalle Kossila (F) – Toronto
- Egor Sokolov (F) – Belleville
- Nathan Todd (F) – Manitoba

==== Central Division ====
- Beck Warm (G) – Chicago
- Calen Addison (D) – Iowa
- Cody Franson (D) – Rockford
- Riley Barber (F) – Grand Rapids
- Riley Damiani (F) – Texas
- Adam Mascherin (F) – Texas

==== North Division ====
- Zane McIntyre (G) – Lehigh Valley
- Oskari Laaksonen (D) – Rochester
- Cameron Schilling (D) – Hershey
- Boris Katchouk (F) – Syracuse
- Connor McMichael (F) – Hershey
- Taylor Raddysh (F) – Syracuse

==== Pacific Division ====
- Logan Thompson (G) – Henderson
- Josh Mahura (D) – San Diego
- Ryan Murphy (D) – Henderson
- Cooper Marody (F) – Bakersfield
- Andrew Poturalski (F) – San Diego
- T. J. Tynan (F) – Colorado

==== All-rookie ====
- Logan Thompson (G) – Henderson
- Calen Addison (D) – Iowa
- Max Gildon (D) – Bakersfield
- Riley Damiani (F) – Texas
- Connor McMichael (F) – Hershey
- Phil Tomasino (F) – Chicago

== See also ==
- List of AHL seasons
- 2020 in ice hockey

| Preceded by 2019–20 | AHL seasons | Succeeded by 2021–22 |
