= Bakersfield Condors =

American Hockey League team in Bakersfield, California

- City: Bakersfield, California
- League: American Hockey League (AHL)
- Conference: Western
- Division: Pacific
- Founded: 1984
- Home arena: Dignity Health Arena
- Colors: Blue, orange, silver, white
- Owners: Oilers Entertainment Group; Daryl Katz
- General manager: Keith Gretzky
- Head coach: Colin Chaulk
- Captain: Seth Griffith
- Media: The Bakersfield Californian; Prime Ticket; Fox Sports 970; AHL.TV (Internet)
- Affiliates: Edmonton Oilers (NHL); Fort Wayne Komets (ECHL)

Franchise history
- 1984–1988: Nova Scotia Oilers
- 1988–1996: Cape Breton Oilers
- 1996–2003: Hamilton Bulldogs
- 2003–2004: Toronto Roadrunners
- 2004–2005: Edmonton Road Runners
- 2010–2015: Oklahoma City Barons
- 2015–present: Bakersfield Condors

Championships
- Division titles: 2 (2018–19, 2020–21)

The Bakersfield Condors are a professional ice hockey team based in Bakersfield, California. They are the American Hockey League (AHL) affiliate of the National Hockey League's Edmonton Oilers. The Condors play their home games at Dignity Health Arena. The AHL franchise is a relocation of the Oklahoma City Barons, which joined four other AHL franchises in 2015 as the basis to form a new Pacific Division in California.

The Condors replaced the ECHL team of the same name, which played as a charter member of the West Coast Hockey League from 1995 until 2003 and then in the ECHL from 2003 until the end of the 2014–15 season, after which they moved to Norfolk, Virginia, to play as the Norfolk Admirals. The Condors are the only AHL team in the United States affiliated with a Canadian team.

== History ==
On December 18, 2014, the Oklahoma City Barons and Edmonton Oilers mutually agreed to end the Barons' operations after the end of the 2014–15 season, with the Barons management citing financial problems and the Oilers citing a desire to "move on." One month later, on January 29, 2015, the AHL announced that the Oilers would relocate their franchise to Bakersfield as one of five charter members to form the basis of a new Pacific Division beginning in the 2015–16 season. A name-the-team contest was held from January 30 until February 15, 2015. The Condors name was announced as the winner on February 25, 2015. The Condors unveiled their new logo and colors on April 2, 2015.

On December 18, 2015, the Condors participated in the AHL's first outdoor game in California, called the Golden State Hockey Rush, at Raley Field in West Sacramento against the Stockton Heat. The Heat would defeat the Condors 3–2 in front of 9,357 fans. Despite not making the playoffs in their first season, the Condors still contributed to the overall increase in AHL attendance with an average of 5195 per night, an increase of about 1900 spectators compared to the former Barons and similar to the former ECHL Condors.

In the 2016–17 season, the Condors were named as hosts for their second AHL Outdoor Classic game, named the Condorstown Outdoor Classic, against the Ontario Reign held on January 7, 2017, at Bakersfield College's Memorial Stadium. Despite sometimes heavy rain, the game went on as scheduled and the Condors defeated the Reign 3–2 in overtime.

During the 2018–19 season, the Condors tied the second-longest AHL winning streak at 17 games from January 12 to February 25, 2019. The Condors finished in first place in Pacific Division in the regular season before the San Diego Gulls eliminated them in the second round of the playoffs.

== Season-by-season results ==
Regular season											Playoffs					
Season	GP	W	L	OTL	SOL	Pts	PCT	GF	GA	Standing	Year	Prelims	1st round	2nd round	3rd round	Finals
2015–16	68	31	28	7	2	71	.522	212	222	5th, Pacific	2016	Did not qualify				
2016–17	68	33	29	5	1	72	.529	200	188	5th, Pacific	2017	Did not qualify				
2017–18	68	31	27	9	1	72	.529	188	206	7th, Pacific	2018	Did not qualify				
2018–19	68	42	21	3	2	89	.654	242	182	1st, Pacific	2019	—	W, 3–1, COL	L, 2–4, SD	—	—
2019–20	56	21	27	5	3	50	.446	162	202	6th, Pacific	2020	Season cancelled due to the COVID-19 pandemic				
2020–21	39	24	14	0	1	49	.628	129	104	2nd, Pacific	2021 (Note: The 2021 Calder Cup playoffs were not held; the Pacific Division held a postseason tournament for the division title. The bottom four teams had single-elimination play-in games to qualify for the semifinals (the first two rounds). The division semifinals and finals were best-of-three for the John D. Chick Trophy (the last two rounds).)	—	BYE	BYE	W, 2–1, SD	W, 2–1, HSK
2021–22	68	37	21	5	5	84	.618	225	192	4th, Pacific	2022	W, 2–0, ABB	L, 0–3, STK	—	—	—
2022–23	72	37	31	2	2	78	.542	212	212	5th, Pacific	2023	L, 0–2, ABB	—	—	—	—
2023–24	72	39	27	4	2	84	.583	223	202	6th, Pacific	2024	L, 0–2, ONT	—	—	—	—
2024–25	72	32	30	7	3	74	.514	224	233	8th, Pacific	2025	Did not qualify				
2025–26	72	37	23	11	1	86	.597	244	236	5th, Pacific	2026	L, 1–2, CV	—	—	—	—

== Players ==
=== Current roster ===
Updated November 17, 2026.

No.	Nat	Player	Pos	S/G	Age	Acquired	Birthplace	Contract
82	(Canada)	Beau Akey	D	R	21	2025	Waterloo, Ontario	Oilers
62	(United States)	Zach Bookman	D	R	24	2026	Syracuse, New York	Condors
44	(Canada)	Josh Brown (A)	D	R	32	2024	London, Ontario	Oilers
73	(United States)	Damien Carfagna	D	L	23	2025	Wood Ridge, New Jersey	Oilers
78	(Czech Republic)	Tomáš Cibulka	D	L	22	2026	Ceske Budejovice, Czech Republic	Oilers
64	(Canada)	Connor Clattenburg	LW	L	21	2025	Arnprior, Ontario	Oilers
19	(Canada)	Daniel D'Amato	RW	L	25	2024	Maple, Ontario	Condors
66	(United States)	John Gormley	D	R	26	2026	The Bronx, New York	Condors
39	(Canada)	Seth Griffith (C)	C	R	33	2021	Wallaceburg, Ontario	Condors
53	(United States)	Isaac Howard	LW	L	22	2025	Hudson, Wisconsin	Oilers
23	(United States)	Quinn Hutson	RW	R	24	2025	North Barrington, Illinois	Oilers
33	(Sweden)	Samuel Jonsson	G	L	22	2025	Gävle, Sweden	Oilers
63	(Canada)	Ethan Keppen	LW	L	25	2025	Whitby, Ontario	Condors
37	(Finland)	Atro Leppänen	D	L	27	2025	Mantta, Finland	Oilers
57	(Finland)	Viljami Marjala	LW	L	23	2025	Oulu, Finland	Oilers
56	(Canada)	William Nicholl	C	L	20	2026	Ottawa, Ontario	Oilers
68	(United States)	Rhett Pitlick	LW	L	25	2025	Coral Springs, Florida	Condors
38	(Finland)	Aku Räty	RW	R	25	2026	Oulunsalo, Finland	Oilers
51	(Canada)	Tucker Robertson	C	R	23	2026	Toronto, Ontario	Condors
81	(Germany)	Josh Samanski	C	L	24	2025	Erding, Germany	Oilers
79	(Sweden)	Samuel Sjölund	D	L	25	2026	Stockholm, Sweden	Condors
70	(United States)	James Stefan	RW	R	23	2024	Laguna Beach, California	Oilers
61	(Canada)	Riley Stillman (A)	D	L	28	2025	Calgary, Alberta	Oilers
41	(Canada)	Brady Stonehouse	RW	L	22	2025	Blenheim, Ontario	Oilers
86	(Canada)	Simon Tassy	RW	R	25	2026	Montreal, Quebec	Condors
90	(Canada)	Matt Tomkins	G	L	32	2025	Edmonton, Alberta	Oilers
36	(Latvia)	Eduards Tralmaks	RW	L	29	2026	Riga, Latvia	Oilers
32	(Canada)	Connor Ungar	G	L	24	2024	Calgary, Alberta	Oilers

=== Team captains ===
- Ryan Hamilton, 2015–2018
- Keegan Lowe, 2018–2020
- Brad Malone, 2020–2024
- Seth Griffith, 2024–present

=== Notable alumni ===
List of Bakersfield Condors alumni who played more than 100 games in Bakersfield and 100 or more games in the National Hockey League.

- (Canada) Josh Brown
- (Canada) Drake Caggiula
- (Canada) Vincent Desharnais
- (United States) Caleb Jones
- (United States) Michael Kesselring
- (Sweden) William Lagesson
- (Canada) Brad Malone
- (Canada) Greg McKegg
- (Canada) Stuart Skinner
- (Canada) Ryan Stanton
