= San Diego Gulls =

American Hockey League team in San Diego, California

- City: San Diego, California
- League: American Hockey League
- Conference: Western
- Division: Pacific
- Founded: 2000
- Home arena: Pechanga Arena
- Colors: Black, orange, blue, white
- Owners: Henry Samueli & Susan Samueli
- General manager: Rick Paterson
- Head coach: Dave Manson
- Captain: Ryan Carpenter
- Media: San Diego Union-Tribune; KGB-AM (San Diego Sports 760); AHL.TV (Internet)
- Affiliates: Anaheim Ducks (NHL); Tulsa Oilers (ECHL)
- Website: sandiegogulls.com

Franchise history
- 2000–2015: Norfolk Admirals
- 2015–present: San Diego Gulls

The San Diego Gulls are a professional ice hockey team based in San Diego. They compete in the American Hockey League (AHL) and play their home games at Pechanga Arena. The Gulls began play in the 2015–16 season. The team is an affiliate of the National Hockey League's (NHL) Anaheim Ducks.

== History ==
On January 29, 2015, the Anaheim Ducks announced that they would purchase the Norfolk Admirals of the American Hockey League, and move the team to San Diego as one of five charter members of the AHL's new Pacific Division. The team plays at Pechanga Arena in San Diego, the sixth professional hockey team to play there, following the original San Diego Gulls of the WHL (1966–74), the San Diego Mariners of the WHA (1974–1977), the San Diego Hawks of the Pacific Hockey League (1977–1979), the second San Diego Gulls of the IHL (1990–1995), and the third San Diego Gulls of the West Coast Hockey League (1995–2003) and ECHL (2003–2006). The current team is the fifth hockey team in San Diego to use the "Gulls" name.

The Gulls' name, logo, and colors were revealed on February 22, 2015, at HockeyFest. HockeyFest was deemed a success, drawing over 8,500 enthusiastic hockey fans.

The San Diego Gulls played their first home game on October 10, 2015, against the Grand Rapids Griffins. The team finished its inaugural season with an average attendance of 8,675, second in the league after the Hershey Bears.

After four seasons and three playoff appearances, the Anaheim Ducks promoted Gulls' head coach Dallas Eakins to the same position with the Ducks. Former Florida Panthers' head coach Kevin Dineen was hired as the next head coach.

Approaching the delayed 2020–21 season, due to COVID-19 pandemic considerations, the Gulls announced they would temporarily relocate and play the season out of the Ducks' practice rink, Great Park Ice & FivePoint Arena, in Irvine, California. The Gulls finished third in the Pacific Division and lost in the semifinals to the second place Bakersfield Condors in division postseason tournament. After two seasons, the Ducks did not extend head coach Dineen, instead hiring former Laval Rocket head coach Joel Bouchard. After a lackluster season under Bouchard, the Gulls would hire long-time AHL head coach Roy Sommer to be their fourth head coach in team history. In Sommer's only season as head coach of the Gulls, the Gulls finished with the fewest number of points in the AHL. He retired at the end of the season.

Matt McIlvane was hired as the new coach for the 2023–24 season, specifically due to his experience of working with younger players.

=== Rivalries ===
==== Ontario Reign ====
The Gulls consider the Ontario Reign, the Los Angeles Kings' AHL affiliate, to be their chief rivals and advertise games as "Rivalry Night".

The rivalry has been fueled by each teams' respective NHL affiliates, with Ontario being an affiliate of the Los Angeles Kings, and San Diego being affiliated with the Anaheim Ducks. Both Anaheim and Los Angeles share an intense rivalry dubbed the Freeway Faceoff.

Both fanbases of Ontario and San Diego are best known for traveling to away games at the other teams' respective arena, Toyota Arena in Ontario and Pechanga Arena in San Diego on numerous occasions throughout the respective season while firing off chants of "Go Reign Go" or "Let's Go Gulls" while inside the opposing venue.

The teams faced each other in the 2016 division finals, where the Reign defeated the Gulls 4–1 in a best-of-seven series. San Diego then defeated the Reign in the 2017 Calder Cup playoffs 3-games-to-2 in the division semifinals. Ontario would one-up San Diego with another postseason series victory after sweeping San Diego 2 games to none during the 2021–22 playoffs.

==== Bakersfield Condors ====
The Gulls have a rivalry with the Bakersfield Condors, the affiliate of the Edmonton Oilers.

Bakersfield, then known as the Bakersfield Fog from 1995 until 1998 when the franchise was rebranded as the Condors, and San Diego, were charter members of the West Coast Hockey League from its inception in 1995 until the league was absorbed by the East Coast Hockey League in 2003.

In the 2015–16 season, Bakersfield and San Diego had multiple fights and line brawls during a game played at Mechanics Bank Arena. Each team has scored a postseason series victory over the other.

Notably, on May 3, 2019, in the Pacific Division Finals of the 2019 Calder Cup playoffs, the Gulls defeated the Condors 3–2 in quadruple overtime for the 1–0 series lead. Maxime Comtois scored the game winning goal 4:20 into the fourth overtime period, ending the game after five hours and ten minutes of play. San Diego would upset Bakersfield by winning the series 4 games to 2. Bakersfield played San Diego during the COVID-shortened 2020–21 Pacific Division playoffs, defeating San Diego 2 games to 1 in the best of 3 series.

==== Tucson Roadrunners ====
The Gulls also share a rivalry with the Tucson Roadrunners, the AHL affiliate of the Utah Mammoth and formerly the Arizona Coyotes' affiliate. San Diego and Tucson's rivalry has been dubbed the "I-8 Border Cup" with the winner of each season's series between the two teams being presented with the "I-8 Border Cup Trophy", which has been in the possession of the Roadrunners since the 2018–19 season. As of the 2024–25, the two teams have faced each other 80 times during the regular season, with the Roadrunners holding a record of 43–34–2–1 against the Gulls. In the 2024–25 season, Tucson secured the series with a 5–3–0–0 record.

== Season-by-season records ==
Regular season												Playoffs					
Season	GP	W	L	OTL	SOL	Pts	PCT	GF	GA	Standing	Avg. attendance	Year	Prelims	1st round	2nd round	3rd round	Finals
2015–16	68	39	23	4	2	84	.618	208	200	2nd, Pacific	8,675	2016	—	W, 3–1, TEX	L, 1–4, ONT	—	—
2016–17	68	43	20	3	2	91	.669	221	178	2nd, Pacific	8,876	2017	—	W, 3–2, ONT	L, 1–4, SJ	—	—
2017–18	68	36	28	3	1	76	.559	202	197	5th, Pacific	9,305	2018	—	Did not qualify			
2018–19	68	36	24	5	3	80	.588	239	221	3rd, Pacific	9,021	2019	—	W, 3–1, SJ	W, 4–2, BAK	L, 2–4, CHI	—
2019–20	57	30	19	6	2	68	.596	185	164	4th, Pacific	7,582	2020	Season cancelled due to the COVID-19 pandemic				
2020–21	44	26	17	1	0	53	.602	153	142	3rd, Pacific	—	2021 (Note: The 2021 Calder Cup playoffs were not held; the Pacific Division held a postseason tournament for the division title. The bottom four teams had single-elimination play-in games to qualify for the semifinals (the first two rounds). The division semifinals and finals were best-of-three for the John D. Chick Trophy (the last two rounds).)	—	BYE	BYE	L, 1–2, BAK	—
2021–22	68	28	33	4	3	63	.463	197	223	7th, Pacific	6,992	2022	L, 0–2, ONT	—	—	—	—
2022–23	72	20	49	2	1	43	.299	180	281	10th, Pacific	6,953	2023	Did not qualify				
2023–24	72	26	35	10	1	63	.438	216	245	9th, Pacific	7,249	2024	Did not qualify				
2024–25	72	29	35	5	3	66	.458	216	251	9th, Pacific	7,249	2025	Did not qualify				
2025–26	72	33	27	8	4	78	.542	224	228	7th, Pacific	TBD	2026	L, 0–2, COL	—	—	—	—

== Players ==
=== Current roster ===
Updated November 20, 2026.

No.	Nat	Player	Pos	S/G	Age	Acquired	Birthplace	Contract
3	(United States)	Matt Basgall	D	R	24	2026	Lake Forest, Illinois	Gulls
39	(Canada)	Laurent Brossoit	G	L	33	2026	Port Alberni, British Columbia	Ducks
22	(United States)	Ryan Carpenter (C)	C	R	35	2024	Oviedo, Florida	Gulls
35	(Italy)	Damian Clara	G	L	21	2025	Brunico, Italy	Ducks
36	(Canada)	Drew Elliott	LW	L	23	2025	Saint John, New Brunswick	Gulls
16	(United States)	Sean Farrell	C	L	25	2026	Milton, Massachusetts	Ducks
17	(Canada)	Nathan Gaucher	C	R	23	2023	Chambly, Quebec	Ducks
11	(Canada)	James Hamblin (A)	C	L	27	2026	Edmonton, Alberta	Ducks
24	(United States)	Travis Howe	RW	R	32	2022	Hull, Massachusetts	Gulls
6	(United States)	Nick Jensen	D	R	36	2026	Saint Paul, Minnesota	Ducks
41	(United States)	Roman Kinal	D	L	28	2024	Waterford, Michigan	Gulls
10	(United States)	Travis Mitchell	D	L	27	2026	South Lyon, Michigan	Ducks
23	(Sweden)	Lucas Pettersson	C	L	20	2026	Örnsköldsvik, Sweden	Ducks
18	(Canada)	Matthew Phillips (A)	RW	R	28	2025	Calgary, Alberta	Gulls
14	(Canada)	Coulson Pitre	RW	R	21	2024	Newmarket, Ontario	Ducks
37	(Canada)	Ethan Procyszyn	C	R	20	2026	Wasaga Beach, Ontario	Ducks
44	(United States)	Corey Schueneman	D	L	31	2026	Milford, Michigan	Ducks
19	(Belarus)	Yegor Sidorov	RW	L	22	2024	Vitebsk, Belarus	Ducks
38	(Canada)	Konnor Smith	D	L	22	2024	Windsor, Ontario	Ducks
40	(Sweden)	Herman Traff	RW	R	20	2026	Växjö, Sweden	Ducks
25	(Sweden)	Anton Wahlberg	C	L	21	2026	Malmö, Sweden	Ducks
4	(Canada)	Jett Woo	D	R	26	2026	Winnipeg, Manitoba	Ducks

=== Team captains ===
- Joe Piskula, 2015–16
- Jaycob Megna, 2018–19
- Sam Carrick, 2019–21
- Greg Pateryn, 2021–22
- Chase De Leo, 2022–24
- Ryan Carpenter, 2024–present

=== American Hockey League Hall of Famers ===
AHL Hall of Fame Honored Members
Name	Seasons	Induction Year
Jean-Francois Labbe	2016-20 (goalie coach)	2016
Roy Sommer	2022-23 (head coach)	2024

=== Retired numbers ===
San Diego Gulls retired numbers
No.	Player	Position	Career	No. retirement
20	Willie O’Ree	LW	1967–1974^{1}	October 16, 2015

Notes:

- ^{1} (1967–74 with the San Diego Gulls of the WHL)

== Team records and leaders ==
=== Scoring leaders ===
These are the top-ten point-scorers for the San Diego Gulls in the AHL. Figures are updated after each completed season.

Note: Pos = Position; GP = Games Played; G = Goals; A = Assists; Pts = Points; P/G = Points per game; = current Gulls player

Points
Player	Pos	GP	G	A	Pts	P/G
Chase De Leo	C	228	69	117	186	.82
Sam Carrick	C	222	86	95	181	.82
Corey Tropp	RW	205	64	93	157	.76
Kalle Kossila	LW	170	51	90	141	.83
Nikolas Brouillard	D	167	22	70	92	.55
Andrew Agozzino	LW	103	39	52	91	.88
Jacob Perreault	RW	161	32	59	91	.56
Benoit-Olivier Groulx	C	145	39	51	90	.62
Brandon Montour	D	104	25	64	89	.85
Kevin Roy	LW	125	31	57	88	.70
