= Viljami Jokiranta =

Finnish footballer (born 2006)

Personal information
- Date of birth: 23 July 2006 (age 20)
- Place of birth: Finland
- Height: 1.78 m (5 ft 10 in)
- Position: Midfielder

Team information
- Current team: Lahti
- Number: 18

Youth career
- –2022: PEPO
- 2022–: Lahti

Senior career*
Years	Team	Apps	(Gls)
2022–	Reipas Lahti	29	(4)
2022–	Lahti	9	(0)

International career^{‡}
2021	Finland U16	1	(0)
2022–	Finland U17	9	(0)
- * Club domestic league appearances and goals as of 23 November 2025 ‡ National team caps and goals as of 21 January 2024

Viljami Jokiranta (born 23 July 2006) is a Finnish professional footballer who plays as a midfielder for Ykkösliiga side Lahti.

== Career ==
Jokiranta moved to Lahti and joined FC Lahti organisation from PEPO Lappeenranta in July 2022. He debuted in Veikkausliiga with FC Lahti first team on 24 July 2022, becoming the youngest player ever to debut for the club, at the age of 16 years and one day.
