= Viljami Marjala =

Finnish ice hockey player (born 2003)

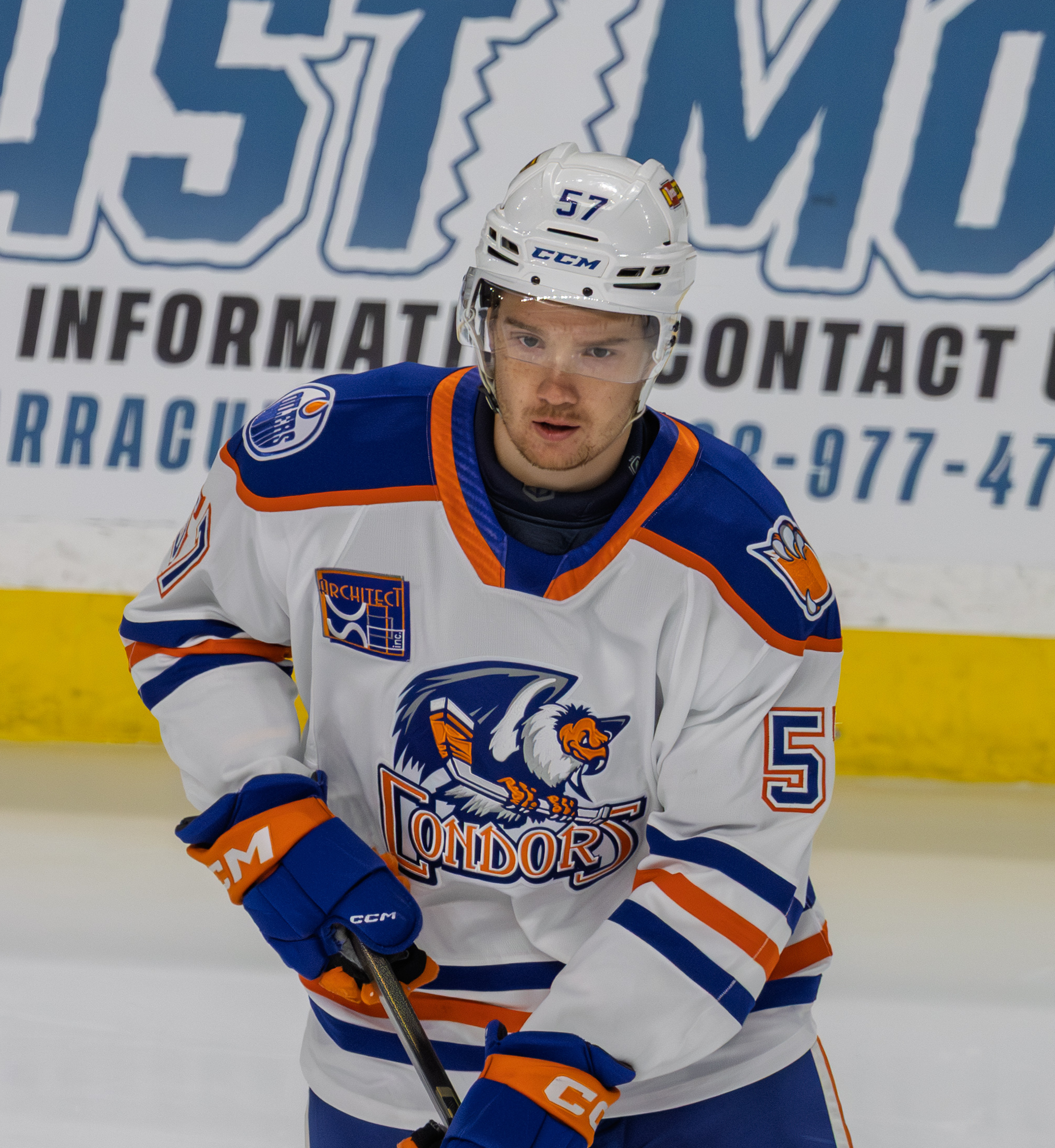
- Marjala with the Bakersfield Condors in 2026
- Born: 29 January 2003 (age 23) Oulu, Finland
- Height: 185 cm (6 ft 1 in)
- Weight: 84.5 kg (186 lb; 13 st 4 lb)
- Position: Forward
- Shoots: Left
- NHL team (P) Cur. team Former teams: Edmonton Oilers; Bakersfield Condors (AHL); TPS
- NHL draft: 159th overall, 2021; Buffalo Sabres
- Playing career: 2022–present

Viljami Marjala (born 29 January 2003) is a Finnish ice hockey forward currently playing for the Bakersfield Condors in the American Hockey League (AHL) while under contract as a prospect to the Edmonton Oilers of the National Hockey League (NHL).

== Playing career ==
In June 2025, Marjala signed a contract with the Edmonton Oilers.

== Career statistics ==
=== Regular season and playoffs ===
			Regular season					Playoffs
Season	Team	League	GP	G	A	Pts	PIM	GP	G	A	Pts	PIM
2020–21	Quebec Remparts	QMJHL	30	5	22	27	10	6	1	4	5	0
2021–22	Quebec Remparts	QMJHL	68	13	33	46	8	12	1	7	8	0
2022–23	TPS	Liiga	15	4	5	9	10	3	0	1	1	2
2023–24	TPS	Liiga	60	17	23	40	16	9	3	6	9	4
2024–25	TPS	Liiga	54	8	44	52	8	5	2	1	3	4
2025–26	Bakersfield Condors	AHL	72	17	43	60	22	3	0	6	6	2
Liiga totals			129	29	72	101	24	17	5	8	13	10

=== International ===
Year	Team	Event	GP	G	A	Pts	PIM
2019	Finland U17	WHC-17	5	2	4	6	0
Junior totals			5	2	4	6	0
