= Seth Appert =

- Born: August 9, 1974 (age 52) Cottage Grove, Minnesota, U.S.
- Height: 5 ft 11 in (180 cm)
- Weight: 180 lb (82 kg; 12 st 12 lb)
- Position: Goaltender
- Shot: Left
- Played for: Ferris State University
- Playing career: 1992–1996 Coaching career

Biographical details
- Education: Ferris State University

Playing career
- 1991-92: Park High School
- 1992-96: Ferris State
- Position: Goaltender

Coaching career (HC unless noted)
- 1997–2006: Denver (Asst.)
- 2007: US U-18 team (Asst.)
- 2008: US U-18 team
- 2007–2017: Rensselaer
- 2017: US U-18 team (Asst.)
- 2018: US U-18 team
- 2017–2018: Team USA (Asst.)
- 2017–2018: USNTDP
- 2020–2024: Rochester Americans
- 2024–present: Buffalo Sabres (Asst.)

Head coaching record
- Overall: 152–221–48 (.418) [College]

Seth Appert (born August 9, 1974) is an American ice hockey coach and former college ice hockey player who is currently serving as an assistant coach with Buffalo Sabres of the NHL. Appert was the head coach of the Rensselaer Polytechnic Institute men's ice hockey team. Appert played collegiate hockey at Ferris State. On August 14, 2020, Appert was named head coach of the Rochester Americans, the top AHL affiliate of the NHL's Buffalo Sabres.

== NCAA Division I ice hockey coaching experience ==
In 1999, Appert became an assistant coach at The University of Denver where he worked until the end of the 2005–2006 season. During that period, Appert helped Denver to capture two NCAA national championships, three WCHA playoff championships, two WCHA regular-season titles, and average 23 wins per season.

On April 19, 2006, Seth Appert was hired as the head ice hockey coach at Rensselaer Polytechnic Institute, replacing Dan Fridgen. He was fired on March 6, 2017.

== Coaching experience with USA Hockey ==
Seth Appert was the head coach of Team USA's Under 18 Men's Ice Hockey Team at the Memorial of Ivan Hlinka Tournament that took place August 8–11, 2011, in Breclav, Czech Republic, and Piestany, Slovakia. Appert had previously served as head coach of Team USA in the Ivan Hlinka Tournament in 2008, and as an assistant coach in 2007.

== Leadership of hockey organizations ==
On May 1, 2008, Appert was elected President of the American Hockey Coaches Association. He served as president of this national organization for three years.

== Community service awards ==
On May 16, 2013, Appert was honored by the Autism Society of the Greater Capital Region of New York for his advocacy and sponsorship of an RPI Engineers Men's Varsity Ice Hockey Game which was designed to be accommodative of people who are on the autistic spectrum. The game was played on January 18, 2013 versus the Colgate University. It took place in an atmosphere with fewer flashing lights, loud music, and public address announcements than would be part of a typical game of this nature.

A second annual Autism Awareness Game took place on December 15, 2013, when RPI played the USA Under-18 Men's Ice Hockey Team

== Charitable work ==
On September 28, 2014, Appert ran the Adirondack Marathon as a fundraising effort for Defending The Blue Line, a U.S. charity that works to ensure that children of military members are afforded every opportunity to participate in the game of ice hockey. Appert ran in memory of Richard Curadi, a soldier with 32 years in the Marines and Army, who died on July 6, 2014. Richard Curadi was the father of Luke Curadi, a former member of the RPI men's varsity ice hockey team.

== College head coaching record ==
Record table
Season	Team	Overall	Conference	Standing	Postseason
Rensselaer Engineers (ECAC Hockey) (2006–2017)
2006–07	Rensselaer	10–18–8	6–11–5	T-8th	ECAC first round
2007–08	Rensselaer	11–23–4	6–13–3	10th	ECAC first round
2008–09	Rensselaer	10–27–2	6–15–1	11th	ECAC quarterfinals
2009–10	Rensselaer	18–17–4	10–9–3	T-5th	ECAC first round
2010–11	Rensselaer	20–13–5	11–9–2	T-4th	NCAA Midwest Regional semifinals
2011–12	Rensselaer	12–24–3	7–12–3	10th	ECAC quarterfinals
2012–13	Rensselaer	18–14–5	12–7–3	2nd	ECAC quarterfinals
2013–14	Rensselaer	15–16–6	8–9–5	7th	ECAC first round
2014–15	Rensselaer	12–26–3	8–12–2	9th	ECAC quarterfinals
2015–16	Rensselaer	18–15–7	8–7–7	6th	ECAC quarterfinals
2016–17	Rensselaer	8–28–1	6–16–0	11th	ECAC first round
Rensselaer:		152–221–48	88–120–34		
Total:		152–221–48	88–120–34		
National champion Postseason invitational champion Conference regular season champion Conference regular season and conference tournament champion Division regular season champion Division regular season and conference tournament champion Conference tournament champion
